= The Very Best of The Rascals =

Greatest hits album by the Rascals
- Released: July 20, 1993
- Recorded: 1965–1970
- Genre: Rock, pop rock, white soul
- Length: 47:38
- Label: Rhino/Atlantic
- Producer: The (Young) Rascals, Tom Dowd, Arif Mardin

The Rascals chronology
| The Island of Real (1972) | The Very Best of The Rascals (1993) |

The Very Best of The Rascals is a compilation album from the Rascals released on July 20, 1993, by Rhino/Atlantic. This compilation contains nearly all of their Atlantic singles, in chronological order, released from 1965 through 1970. The first nine singles are performed by the Young Rascals (the band's former name), while the last seven tracks are credited to the Rascals.

All three of their Billboard Hot 100 number-one singles are included here: "Good Lovin'", "Groovin'", and "People Got to Be Free". In addition, their hit singles "How Can I Be Sure" and "A Beautiful Morning" are also included on the compilation.

== Reception ==
Professional ratings
Review scores
| Source | Rating |
|---|---|
| AllMusic | 4.5/5 stars |

Writing for AllMusic, critic Ron Wynn praised the album and wrote "The Rascals, along with the Righteous Brothers, defined blue-eyed soul singing, making records that were as churchy, earthy, and convincing as anything that came out of the South or Motown in the '60s, backed by tight, anthemic arrangements and excellent combo playing... The only quibble is their failure to include "Look Around," a sociopolitical cut from the Freedom Suite album that's just a cut below "People Got to Be Free" or "A Ray of Hope.""

== Track listing ==
| No. | Title | Writer(s) | Length |
|---|---|---|---|
| 1. | "I Ain't Gonna Eat Out My Heart Anymore" | Pam Sawyer, Lori Burton | 2:45 |
| 2. | "Good Lovin'" | Rudy Clark, Artie Resnick | 2:31 |
| 3. | "You Better Run" | Felix Cavaliere, Eddie Brigati | 2:27 |
| 4. | "Come On Up" | Cavaliere | 2:43 |
| 5. | "I've Been Lonely Too Long" (Single Version) | Cavaliere, Brigati | 2:05 |
| 6. | "Groovin'" | Cavaliere, Brigati | 2:28 |
| 7. | "A Girl Like You" | Cavaliere, Brigati | 2:47 |
| 8. | "How Can I Be Sure" | Cavaliere, Brigati | 2:53 |
| 9. | "It's Wonderful" (Single Version) | Cavaliere, Brigati | 3:21 |
| 10. | "A Beautiful Morning" | Cavaliere, Brigati | 2:34 |
| 11. | "People Got to Be Free" | Cavaliere, Brigati | 2:58 |
| 12. | "A Ray of Hope" | Cavaliere, Brigati | 3:41 |
| 13. | "Heaven" | Cavaliere | 3:22 |
| 14. | "See" (Single Version) | Cavaliere | 4:45 |
| 15. | "Carry Me Back" | Cavaliere | 2:49 |
| 16. | "Glory Glory" | Cavaliere | 3:29 |

Tracks 1–9 are performed by the Young Rascals. The single version of "It's Wonderful" ends with a coda of "Mardi Gras"-style special effects and party sounds that were not included in the album version. Tracks 15 and 16 are CD only bonus tracks.

== Personnel ==
=== The Rascals ===
- Felix Cavaliere – vocals, keyboards
- Eddie Brigati – vocals, percussion
- Gene Cornish – vocals, guitar
- Dino Danelli – drums
