= A Girl Like You (The Young Rascals song) =

1967 single by the Young Rascals

- US single sleeve

Single by the Young Rascals

from the album Groovin'
- B-side: "It's Love"
- Released: June 23, 1967
- Recorded: May 25, 1967
- Studio: Atlantic (New York City)
- Genre: Big band; Blue-eyed soul
- Length: 2:46
- Label: Atlantic
- Songwriters: Eddie Brigati; Felix Cavaliere
- Producer: The Young Rascals

The Young Rascals singles chronology
"Groovin'" (1967)	"A Girl Like You" (1967)	"How Can I Be Sure" (1967)

Audio
- "A Girl Like You" on YouTube

"A Girl Like You" is a song written by Eddie Brigati and Felix Cavaliere, and initially recorded by their band The Young Rascals. Lyrically, the song was inspired by Cavaliere's girlfriend Adrienne and explores the joys of falling in love from several perspectives. Musically, "A Girl Like You" is a blue-eyed soul song with elements of big band, R&B, and sunshine pop. The song features a big brass arrangement alongside harps and piccolos. The song was recorded on May 25, 1967, at Atlantic Studios in New York City with the Young Rascals producing and Arif Mardin providing the arrangements.

After performing on The Ed Sullivan Show, Atlantic Records released "A Girl Like You" as a single in the US on June 23, 1967, with "It's Love" on the B-side. The single continued the Rascals' string of successes, managing to reach number 10 on the Billboard Hot 100 for two consecutive weeks. In Canada, "A Girl Like You" reached number one in September 1967. In the UK, "A Girl Like You" was released on August 4, 1967, and became the Young Rascals' second top-40 single in that country, reaching number 37 on the Record Retailer chart. The song was included as the opening track of the band's third studio album, Groovin', in July 1967. Upon original release, the single received praise, with many critics and journalists focusing on Cavaliere's vocal performance and the backing brass arrangement.

== Composition and recording ==
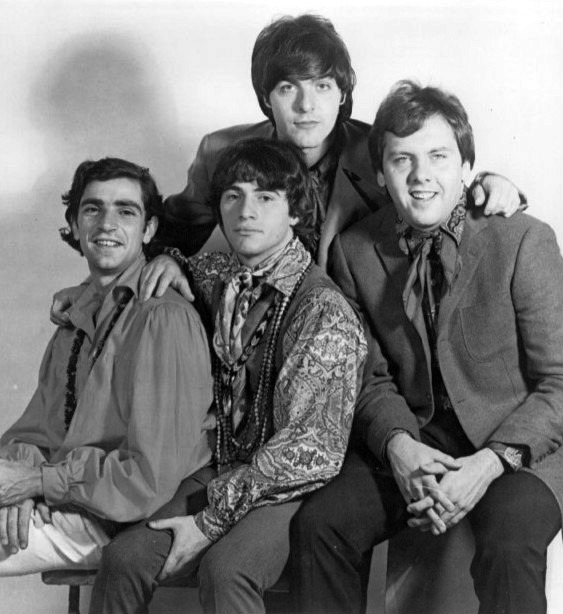
The Young Rascals, with songwriters Felix Cavaliere (left) and Eddie Brigati (second from left)

Similarly to the Young Rascals' two previous US top-twenty singles "I've Been Lonely Too Long" and "Groovin'", "A Girl Like You" was penned by group members Eddie Brigati and Felix Cavaliere. As with those songs and "How Can I Be Sure" (1967), "A Girl Like You" was lyrically influenced by Cavaliere's girlfriend Adrienne, whom he believed was his "muse". Guitarist Lenny Kaye opined the song lyrically revolved around the "joys of falling in love" from perspectives of both "halting uncertainty" to "ecstatic celebration". Jim Newson of AllMusic believed the song to be part of the Young Rascals' "blue-eyed soul era", whereas that site's Matthew Greenwald opined it featured a "big band-feel". On the contrary, journalist Parke Puterbaugh felt "A Girl Like You" channeled the group's "former R&B-fury into positive vibes", and Kaye describing it as "sunny pop".

As described by Brigati for British music magazine Melody Maker in July 1967, "A Girl Like You" was completely different from "Groovin'", instead featuring a "big rhythm thing with lots of brass" and "harp and piccolo riffs". Sung by Cavaliere, With a runtime of two minutes and forty-six seconds, "A Girl Like You" opens with a "gentle, almost classical piano line" before moving into a swing arrangement for the bridge, culminating in the "big band"-sound of the chorus. The song was recorded on May 25, 1967, at Atlantic Studios in New York City. The recording was produced by the Young Rascals themselves, with Arif Mardin providing the big band arrangement. According to musicologist Richie Unterberger, this was "indicative of the much wider assortment of instruments and arrangements" that the Young Rascals had started experimenting with in the studio. According to Kaye, "A Girl Like You" represented the most "prominent use of horns" on a Young Rascals recording to date.

== Release and commercial performance ==
The Young Rascals first promoted "A Girl Like You" on the June 4, 1967, broadcast of The Ed Sullivan Show, which was prior to the single's release. In the United States, "A Girl Like You" got its first issue as the A-side of the Young Rascals' seventh single through Atlantic Records on June 23, 1967. The single's B-side was "It's Love", a jazz-influenced song written by Brigati and Cavaliere which featured Hubert Laws on flute. Having been released only two months after the single release of "Groovin'", Alec Palao and Unterberger opined that "A Girl Like You" might have gotten a little "overlooked" in the previous single's tailwind. In the UK, Atlantic released "A Girl Like You" as a single on August 4, 1967, with the band returning to touring the country to promote the single's British release in October 1967.

In the United States, "A Girl Like You" debuted on the Billboard Hot 100 at position 61 on July 15, 1967. The single peaked at number 10 for two consecutive weeks in August 1967, and dropped out on September 9, by which point it had spent nine weeks on the chart. On the national charts published by Cash Box and Record World, "A Girl Like You" fared better, reaching number eight and five, respectively. Kaye attributed the single's US chart success to "Groovin'", believing it to have "cracked the top-ten" on the "coattails" of "Groovin'". Elsewhere, "A Girl Like You" reached number one for a week on the Canadian RPM Top 100 chart. In Australia, the single reached number 31. In the UK, "A Girl Like You" was the second of only two top-40 singles the Young Rascals' achieved, reaching number 37 on the Record Retailer chart in late August 1967.

"A Girl Like You" first saw album release on July 19, 1967, when it was included on the Young Rascals' third studio album Groovin'. On the album, the song was sequenced as the opening track. The song's stereo mix differs from the mono mix, which is shorter in length. The inclusion of three US top-10 singles, including "A Girl Like You", helped fuel the album's chart success, reaching number five on the Billboard 200. "A Girl Like You" has since been featured on most of the Young Rascals' compilation albums, including Time Peace: The Rascals' Greatest Hits on June 14, 1968 (which reached number one on the Billboard 200), Anthology 1965–1972 (1992), and The Very Best of The Rascals (1993).

== Reception and legacy ==
Upon original release, "A Girl Like You" received primarily positive reviews, with the Billboard staff reviewer describing it as a "well done rocking mover" with a potential for sales "to take the group right back up to the top of the Hot 100". In Record World, the single was described as "at once sweet and powerful" and was certain to "keep up their [Young Rascals'] full head of steam". The staff editors chose it as one of the "single picks of the weeks". Amongst British reviewers, Penny Valentine of Disc and Music Echo found that the song had a "bigger production", though felt it wouldn't be as big of a hit because of the lack of "insinuation and appeal" compared to "Groovin'". Nonetheless, she found the harp to be "nice" and "funnily fitting in", describing the single as a "good record but no instant hit."

In a blind date for Melody Maker, Scottish singer Lulu believed Cavaliere had a nice voice on the single, though she believed their prior Ed Sullivan Show appearances to have been "terrible". She believed the song was "great to dance to", asking to keep a copy of the single. For Derek Johnson of the New Musical Express, "A Girl Like You" was a "real corker of a single" thanks to the "irresistible driving beat and the spine-tingling r&b quality with which it's impregnated". He praised the brass arrangement and harp performance as "sensational", believing it "follows the same pattern" as "Groovin'" in many aspects, though believed "A Girl Like You" to "hit" him with "more impact". Record Mirror's Peter Jones similarly believed "A Girl Like You" was superior to "Groovin'", praising the vocals as "high-flying" and as a "catchy approach to the song". He additionally commented on the arrangement, noting the "bashing brass scene".

Retrospectively, Matthew Greenwald believed "A Girl Like You" represented "another quantum leap for the band who had been growing artistically by leaps and bounds over the past year", praising Dino Danelli's drum performance as "nothing short of spectacular", ending by stating it to be a "true masterpiece".

== Credits and personnel ==
Credits are adapted from the liner notes of the 1993 compilation album The Very Best of The Rascals, unless otherwise noted.

=== The Young Rascals ===
- Felix Cavaliere – lead vocals; piano, organ
- Eddie Brigati – percussion; vocals
- Gene Cornish – guitar, bass; vocals
- Dino Danelli – drums

=== Other personnel ===
- David Brigati – background vocals
- Arif Mardin – arrangement
- Tom Dowd – recording engineer
- Chris Huston – recording engineer

== Charts ==
=== Weekly charts ===
Weekly chart performance for "A Girl Like You"
Chart (1967)	Peak position
Australia (Go-Set)	38
Australia (Kent Music Report)	31
Canada (RPM 100)	1
UK (Record Retailer)	37
US Billboard Hot 100	10
US Cash Box Top 100	8
US Record World 100 Top Pops	5

=== Year-end charts ===
Year-end chart performance for "A Girl Like You"
Chart (1967)	Position
Canada (RPM)	76
US (Cash Box)	84
