= Time Peace: The Rascals' Greatest Hits =

Time Peace

Greatest hits album by the Rascals
- Released: June 24, 1968
- Recorded: September 1965 – March 1968
- Genres: R&B; blue-eyed soul; pop; rock
- Length: 39:49
- Label: Atlantic
- Producers: The Rascals, Arif Mardin, Tom Dowd

The Rascals chronology
Once Upon a Dream (1968)	Time Peace (1968)	Freedom Suite (1969)

Time Peace: The Rascals' Greatest Hits is a greatest hits album from the Rascals, released on June 24, 1968. It reached number one on the Billboard Pop Albums chart by September 1968. It also topped the Cash Box albums chart with a run in the Top 10 for 20 consecutive weeks.

== Release ==
The album is the only such compilation released during the group's active career. Although billed to their later name, most of the material came from when the group was known as the Young Rascals. It contains all their singles through 1968's earlier "A Beautiful Morning", as well as some of their R&B treatments from early in their career. "A Beautiful Morning" had never appeared on an LP/Album prior to this release.

Time Peace was reissued on CD by Atlantic Records in 1990, but subsequently went out of print. It was then reissued as part of the 2003 limited edition Rhino Handmade 6-CD collection All I Really Need: The Atlantic Recordings 1965-1971, which is also now out of print.

== Cover ==
Packaging consisted of a gatefold album cover with front and back consisting of dot-based newspaper cartoon-style drawing of the four group members, with song titles in speech balloons; the interior gave complete song credits on one side, and an ensemble photograph on the other side whose artsy nature and 1968-style dress, together with the album's punning title, foretold the thematic and artistic direction the group was about to undertake.

== Reception ==
Professional ratings
Review scores
Source	Rating
AllMusic	4.5/5 stars
The Rolling Stone Record Guide	5/5 stars

Time Peace was the group's most commercially successful album, reaching number one on the Billboard Pop Albums chart by September 1968. It also topped the Cash Box albums chart with a run in the Top 10 for 20 consecutive weeks. Moreover, showing the group's white soul label was well earned, Time Peace also reached number four on the Billboard Black Albums chart. It was RIAA-certified as a gold record on September 4, 1968.

In 1969 Time Peace was awarded with a Platinum Record for sales of $2,000,000.

Music critic Robert Christgau regarded the album as representative of New York City's rock music at the time, and later included it in his "Basic Record Library" of 1950s and 1960s recordings, published in Christgau's Record Guide: Rock Albums of the Seventies (1981).

== Track listing ==
=== Side One ===
1. "I Ain't Gonna Eat Out My Heart Anymore" (Pam Sawyer, Lori Burton) – 2:41
  - The Rascals' first single (Atlantic #2312, 1965); also included on the 1966 album The Young Rascals
2. "Good Lovin'" (Rudy Clark, Arthur Resnick) – 2:28
  - The Rascals' second single (Atlantic #2321, 1966), and first #1 hit; also included on The Young Rascals
3. "You Better Run" (Felix Cavaliere, Eddie Brigati) – 2:25
  - The A-side of the Rascals' third single (Atlantic #2338, 1966); later included on the 1967 album Groovin'
4. "Come On Up" (Cavaliere) – 2:41
  - The Rascals' fourth single (Atlantic #2353, 1966), also included on the 1966 album Collections
5. "Mustang Sally" (Bonny Rice) – 3:59
  - Uncut version from The Young Rascals
6. "Love is a Beautiful Thing" (Cavaliere, Brigati) – 2:30
  - Originally released as the B-side of "You Better Run"; later included on Collections
7. "In the Midnight Hour" (Wilson Pickett, Steve Cropper) – 4:00
  - From The Young Rascals

=== Side Two ===
1. "(I've Been) Lonely Too Long" (Cavaliere, Brigati) – 2:57
  - Uncut version from Collections
2. "Groovin'" (Cavaliere, Brigati) – 2:25
  - The Rascals' second #1 single (Atlantic #2401), released in 1967; also included on Groovin'
3. "A Girl Like You" (Cavaliere, Brigati) – 2:46
  - The follow-up Top 10 single to "Groovin'" (Atlantic #2424, 1967); also included on Groovin'
4. "How Can I Be Sure" (Cavaliere, Brigati) – 2:50
  - The Rascals' third Top 10 single of 1967 (Atlantic #2438); also included on Groovin'
5. "It's Wonderful" (Cavaliere, Brigati) – 2:40
  - LP version (without the "Mardi Gras" special effects coda) from the 1968 album Once Upon a Dream
6. "Easy Rollin'" (Cavaliere, Brigati) – 2:55
  - From Once Upon a Dream
7. "A Beautiful Morning" (Cavaliere, Brigati) – 2:32
  - Non-LP single from 1968 (Atlantic #2493)

== Personnel ==
=== The Rascals ===
- Felix Cavaliere – vocals, keyboards
- Eddie Brigati – vocals, percussion
- Gene Cornish – vocals, guitar
- Dino Danelli – drums

=== Production ===
- Stanislaw Zagórski – album design

== Charts ==
Weekly chart performance
Chart (1968—1969)	Peak position
US Billboard Top LP's	1
US Billboard Best Selling Rhythm & Blues LP's	4
US Cash Box Top 100 Albums	1
US Record World 100 Top LP's	1

Year-end chart performance
Chart (1968)	Peak position
US Billboard Top LP's	56
US Billboard Best Selling Rhythm & Blues LP's	31
US Cash Box Top 100 Albums	14

Year-end chart performance
Chart (1969)	Peak position
US Billboard Top LP's	61
US Cash Box Top 100 Albums	49

== Certifications ==
Region	Certification	Certified units/sales
United States (RIAA)	Gold	500,000^{^}
^{^} Shipments figures based on certification alone.
