= Groovin' (The Young Rascals album) =

Studio album by the Young Rascals
- Released: July 31, 1967
- Recorded: May 9, 1966 – June 22, 1967
- Genres: Blue-eyed soul; psychedelic pop; psychedelic soul; garage rock
- Length: 34:34
- Label: Atlantic
- Producer: The Young Rascals

The Young Rascals chronology
Collections (1966)	Groovin' (1967)	Once Upon a Dream (1968)

Singles from Groovin'
- 1. "You Better Run" / "Love Is A Beautiful Thing" Released: May 30, 1966; 2. "Groovin'" / "Sueño" Released: April 10, 1967; 3. "A Girl Like You" / "It's Love" Released: July 3, 1967; 4. "How Can I Be Sure" / "I'm So Happy Now" Released: August 28, 1967

Groovin' is the third album by the rock band the Young Rascals. The album was released on July 31, 1967 and rose to #5 on the Billboard Top LPs chart, number 7 on the R&B chart, and number 2 in Canada. Eight of the songs were released on singles with the title track reaching number 1 on the Pop chart in the U.S.

== History ==
This was the last album on which the band was billed as The Young Rascals; their next album, Once Upon a Dream, would be credited to simply The Rascals. The album began the Rascals' first forays into the psychedelic genre that they would explore further on Once Upon a Dream.

Eight of Groovin''s eleven songs were issued by Atlantic Records as single A- or B-sides. The three songs specific to the album are "Find Somebody", "I Don't Love You Anymore", and the Rascals' cover of "A Place in the Sun". "If You Knew", upon its initial release as the B-side of the single "I've Been Lonely Too Long", was jointly credited to all the Rascals' members; the writing credit was changed upon the album's release. Atlantic Records was at first reluctant to release the title song as a single, but its popularity was such that Italian and Spanish versions were released on different sides of a subsequent single.

Flutist Hubert Laws is featured in a sessions role on the album's final track, "It's Love".

Booker T. & the MG's took a cover of "Groovin'" to the charts later in 1967 and the song "You Better Run" was later covered by Pat Benatar and was a hit for her in 1980.

== Cover design ==
The front cover design was conceived (but not illustrated) by the Young Rascals' drummer Dino Danelli. The illustration was a work of his friend, Lynn Rubin. Affixed to the front cover was one of two stickers indicating: "THIS LP HAS THE BIG HIT", followed by either "How Can I Be Sure" (as shown in the cover photo on the right) or "A Girl Like You" as both tracks climbed into the Top 10.

== Reception ==
Professional ratings
Review scores
Source	Rating
Allmusic	4.5/5 stars

Writing for Allmusic, critic Bruce Eder wrote that the album moved into the psychedelic genre while retaining a "soulful core". He called the album "their best of their entire history... but 'Groovin'' was only one small strong point on the album of the same name."

== Track listing ==
All tracks are written by Felix Cavaliere and Eddie Brigati, except where noted.

Side one
No.	Title	Lead vocal(s)	Length
1.	"A Girl Like You"	Felix Cavaliere	2:51
2.	"Find Somebody"	Eddie Brigati	3:48
3.	"I'm So Happy Now" (Gene Cornish)	Cornish	2:50
4.	"Sueño" (Cavaliere/Brigati, but attributed incorrectly to another writer on some labels)	Cavaliere	2:48
5.	"How Can I Be Sure"	Brigati	2:56

Side two
No.	Title	Lead vocal(s)	Length
1.	"Groovin'"	Cavaliere	2:33
2.	"If You Knew" (Brigati, Cavaliere, Cornish, Dino Danelli)	Brigati with Cavaliere	3:04
3.	"I Don't Love You Anymore" (Cornish)	Cornish	3:09
4.	"You Better Run"	Cavaliere	2:28
5.	"A Place in the Sun" (Ronald Miller, Brian Wells)	Brigati	4:52
6.	"It's Love"	Cavaliere	3:15

== Charts ==
Weekly chart performance
Chart (1967–1968)	Peak position
Canada RPM Top 25 LPs	2
US Billboard Top LP's	5
US Billboard Top Selling R&B LP's	7
US Cash Box Top 100 Albums	6
US Record World 100 Top LP's	3

Year-end chart performance
Chart (1967)	Peak position
US Billboard Top LP's	89
US Billboard Top R&B LP's	26
US Cash Box Top 100 Albums	32

== Certifications ==
Certifications for Groovin'
Region	Certification	Certified units/sales
United States (RIAA)	Gold	500,000^{^}
^{^} Shipments figures based on certification alone.

== Personnel ==
The Rascals

- Felix Cavaliere – vocals, keyboards, organ
- Eddie Brigati – vocals, percussion
- Gene Cornish – guitar, vocals, bass guitar, harmonica; percussion on "Groovin'"
- Dino Danelli – drums, percussion

Additional musicians

- David Brigati – vocals
- Hubert Laws – flute
- Chuck Rainey – bass guitar

== Singles ==
- "Groovin'" / "Sueño" (March 27, 1967) US: #1, UK: #8
- "A Girl Like You" / "It's Love" (July 3, 1967) US: #10
- "Groovin' (Italian version)" / "Groovin' (Spanish version)" (July 17, 1967; these remixes do not appear on the album)
- "How Can I Be Sure" / "I'm So Happy Now" (August 28, 1967) US: #4
