= Freedom Suite (The Rascals album) =

Studio album by The Rascals
- Released: March 17, 1969
- Recorded: May 14 – December 18, 1968
- Genre: Rock
- Length: 64:17
- Label: Atlantic
- Producer: The Rascals, Arif Mardin

The Rascals chronology
Time Peace: The Rascals' Greatest Hits (1968)	Freedom Suite (1969)	See (1969)

Singles from Freedom Suite
- 1. "People Got to Be Free"/"My World" Released: July 1968; 2. "A Ray of Hope"/"Any Dance'll Do" Released: November 1968; 3. "Heaven"/"Baby I'm Blue" Released: February 1969

Freedom Suite is the fifth studio album by American rock band The Rascals. Released as a double album on March 17, 1969, it reached the Billboard 200 Chart, peaking at number 17, as well as reaching number 40 on the Billboard Top R&B chart.

== History ==
Freedom Suite was an ambitious effort and something of a concept album. Packaging included a shiny silver gatefold album cover, with a photograph of the band pasted on the front, colored sleeves with the song lyrics printed on them, and illustrations drawn by members of the group. The latter varied from idealistic visions of trumpeting angels to Eastern-influenced sketchings to drummer Dino Danelli's faithful homage to El Greco's Christ. The inclusion of three instrumentals comprising one complete album of the two-record set—one polished track ("Adrian's Birthday," named in honor of recording engineer Adrian Barber), one jam session ("Cute"), and a Danelli drum solo ("Boom")—seemed to reviewer and critic Richie Unterberger as an effort by The Rascals to establish themselves as an "album" group rather than a "singles" group.

The first LP of the set contained conventional songs, while the second contained the instrumentals. Various session musicians, including bassist Chuck Rainey and saxophonists King Curtis and David "Fathead" Newman, augmented the band's normal line-up on several selections.

The album's content was packaged differently based on format and territory. In North America, the full Freedom Suite album, including the instrumentals, was available in a double album package on LP and on reel-to-reel tape. Cassette and 8-track tape editions, however, were packaged as either one double-play album or as two single albums ("Freedom Suite" and "Music Music") and could be purchased independently. In Great Britain, only the first record of the double album was distributed, with the instrumentals and inserts omitted completely.

The album contained the Rascals' last #1 hit single "People Got To Be Free," which was released in advance of the album in mid-1968. "A Ray of Hope/Any Dance'll Do" (November 1968) and "Heaven/Baby I'm Blue" (February 1969) were also issued as singles.

The political climate of the time helped fuel the songwriting efforts for Freedom Suite; most notably, "People Got to Be Free" was inspired by the April 1968 assassination of Martin Luther King Jr., and "A Ray of Hope" by the June 1968 assassination of Robert F. Kennedy (the latter song's figurative "ray of hope" is surviving Kennedy brother Ted Kennedy). Cavaliere was quoted in Billboard magazine, remarking "After King and Kennedy and what happened in Chicago (i.e., the demonstrations and resulting police actions at the 1968 Democratic National Convention), we just had to say something."

Prior to this album, the Rascals' primary vocalists Felix Cavaliere and Eddie Brigati co-authored most of the band's original songs. On Freedom Suite, however, that trend began to change, with Cavaliere credited as sole author of four of the album's vocal tracks. Brigati's songwriting and vocal contributions would continue to decline on subsequent albums.

== Reception ==
Professional ratings
Review scores
Source	Rating
Allmusic	3/5 stars

The album was RIAA-certified as a gold record on April 21, 1969, rising to #17 on the Billboard 200. It also reached #40 on the Billboard Top R&B chart, the last Rascals album to appear there. In Canada, it reached #20.

It was not especially well received; critic Lester Bangs would later write that Freedom Suite suffered from "excess," while critic Dave Marsh would later write that it "sowed the seeds of the group's demise, [as it] reflected an attempt to join the psychedelic craze."

Writing for Allmusic, critic Thom Jurek wrote of the album "if that outing [Once Upon a Dream] had been ambitious and even visionary, the double Freedom Suite, released in 1969 as the group's fifth album, was off the map. The band dug in and wrote a single LP's worth of solid tunes including a quartet of fine singles."

== Track listing ==
=== Record One: Freedom Suite ===
==== Side One ====
1. "America the Beautiful" (Felix Cavaliere) – 2:50
2. "Me and My Friends" (Gene Cornish) – 2:42
3. "Any Dance'll Do" (Cavaliere) – 2:19
4. "Look Around" (Eddie Brigati, Cavaliere) – 3:03
5. "A Ray of Hope" (Brigati, Cavaliere) – 3:40

==== Side Two ====
1. "Island of Love" (Brigati, Cavaliere) – 2:22
2. "Of Course" (Brigati, Cavaliere) – 2:40
3. "Love Was So Easy to Give" (Cornish) – 2:42
4. "People Got to Be Free" (Brigati, Cavaliere) – 2:57
5. "Baby I'm Blue" (Cavaliere) – 2:47
6. "Heaven" (Cavaliere) – 3:22

=== Record Two: Music Music ===
==== Side Three ====
1. "Adrian's Birthday" (Cavaliere, Cornish, Dino Danelli) – 4:46
2. "Boom" (Danelli) – 13:34

==== Side Four ====
1. "Cute" (Brigati, Cavaliere, Cornish, Danelli) – 15:10

== Certifications ==
US-Gold (500,000 copies sold).

== Personnel ==
=== The Rascals ===
- Felix Cavaliere - organ, piano, lead vocals except as indicated below, backing vocals
- Eddie Brigati - conga drums and tambourine on "Cute", lead vocals on "Any Dance'll Do" and "Island of Love", backing vocals
- Gene Cornish - guitar, lead vocals on "Me & My Friends" and "Love Was So Easy to Give", backing vocals
- Dino Danelli - drums

=== Additional musicians ===
- Richard Davis, Jerry Jemmott, Chuck Rainey - bass guitar
- David Brigati - backing vocals
- King Curtis - tenor saxophone solo on "Of Course"
- David Newman - tenor saxophone solo on "Adrian's Birthday"

=== Production ===
- Arif Mardin, Charles Morrow - arrangements
- Adrian Barber, Tom Dowd, Don Casale - recording engineers
