= People Got to Be Free =

Single by the Rascals

from the album Freedom Suite
- B-side: "My World"
- Released: July 1, 1968
- Recorded: May 14, 1968
- Genre: Blue-eyed soul
- Length: 3:01
- Label: Atlantic
- Songwriters: Felix Cavaliere; Eddie Brigati
- Producers: The Rascals with Arif Mardin

The Rascals singles chronology
"A Beautiful Morning" (1968)	"People Got to Be Free" (1968)	"A Ray of Hope" (1968)

"People Got to Be Free" is a song released in 1968 by the Rascals, written by Felix Cavaliere and Eddie Brigati and featuring a lead vocal from Cavaliere.

== Background ==
The song is a musically upbeat but impassioned plea for tolerance and freedom:

All the world over, so easy to see!
People everywhere, just wanna be free.
Listen, please listen! that's the way it should be
Peace in the valley, people got to be free.

In the song's coda, Felix says in a half-sung, half-spoken voice, that the "Train of Freedom", is "about to arrive any minute now", that "it has been long, long overdue", and that it's "coming right on through", before the song's fade with Felix saying "Chug" repeatedly.

It became a big hit in the turbulent summer of 1968, spending five weeks atop the US Billboard Hot 100 chart, the group's longest such stay. It was also the group's second-most successful single on the Billboard Black Singles chart, reaching number 14 and trailing only the previous year's "Groovin'". "People Got to Be Free" was RIAA-certified as a gold record on August 23, 1968, and eventually sold over 4 million copies. It later was included on the group's March 1969 album Freedom Suite. Billboard ranked the record as the number 5 song for 1968.

The single's picture sleeve photo was previously featured in the inner album cover of the Rascals' Time Peace: The Rascals' Greatest Hits compilation. The B-side, "My World", was a track from the group's Once Upon a Dream album.

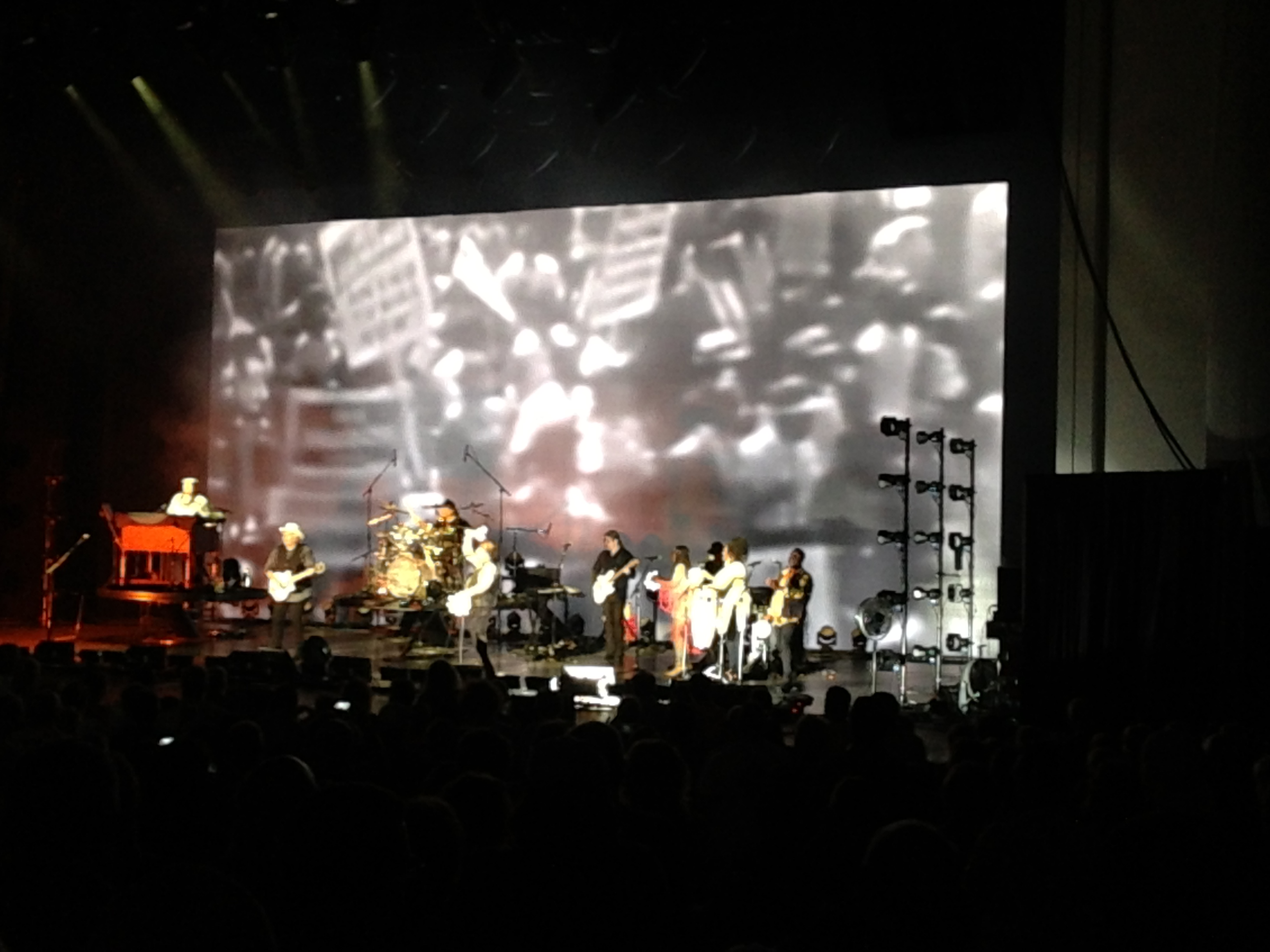
The Rascals performed "People Got to Be Free" during their 2013 Once Upon a Dream show, with footage of 1960s civil rights marches displayed on the video screen behind them.

While "People Got to Be Free" was perceived by some as related to the assassination of Martin Luther King Jr. and of Robert F. Kennedy earlier that year, it was recorded before the latter's death. Rather, it was partly a reaction to an ugly encounter wherein the long-haired group was threatened by a group of rednecks, because the group had grown beards and longer hair, after their tour vehicle broke down in Fort Pierce, Florida.

The song is clearly a product of its times; however, two decades later writer Dave Marsh included it as number 237 in his book Heart of Rock and Soul: The 1001 Greatest Singles of All Time, saying in reference to, and paraphrase of, the song's lyric, "Ask me my opinion, my opinion will be: Dated, but NEVER out of date."

After this song came out, the Rascals would only perform at concerts that featured an African American act; when that condition was not met, the Rascals canceled several shows in protest.

== Chart history ==
=== Weekly charts ===
Chart (1968)	Peak position
Australia (Kent Music Report)	11
Canada RPM Top Singles	1
New Zealand (Listener)	14
U.S. Billboard Hot 100	1
U.S. Billboard R&B Singles	14
U.S. Cash Box Top 100	1

=== Year-end charts ===
Chart (1968)	Rank
Canada	5
U.S. Billboard Hot 100	5
U.S. Cash Box	7

== Cover versions ==
- Dionne Warwick recorded the song as part of her LP Soulful in 1969, and it was released as a single in the UK in the same year.
- The 5th Dimension recorded "People Got to Be Free" in 1970 as part of a medley with another socially relevant song, Sam Cooke's "A Change Is Gonna Come." The pairing reached number 60 on the Billboard Pop Singles chart.
- Johnny Maestro & the Brooklyn Bridge performed this song live in concert, and it has turned up on YouTube as part of The Bridge's "lost tapes" series of songs.
- The Christian group DeGarmo & Key covered this song on their final album, "To Extremes," recorded in 1994.
- The jazz-rock supergroup The New York Rock and Soul Revue covered this song on their 1991 self titled album.
