= Brigati =

Brigati is a surname. Notable people with the surname include:

- David Brigati (1940–2026), American singer
- Eddie Brigati (born 1945), American singer and songwriter

== See also ==
- Brigatinib
