= Rock Me Baby (album) =

Studio album by David Cassidy
- Released: October 1972
- Studios: Western Recorders, Hollywood, California
- Genres: Rock, R&B, blue-eyed soul
- Length: 37:09
- Labels: Bell, re-released on Arista
- Producer: Wes Farrell

David Cassidy chronology
Cherish (1972)	Rock Me Baby (1972)	Dreams Are Nuthin' More Than Wishes (1973)

Professional ratings
Review scores
Source	Rating
AllMusic	3.5/5 stars

Rock Me Baby is the second solo album release from David Cassidy. It was produced by Wes Farrell for Bell Records, and released in 1972. The album introduced some rock, soul and R&B flavors in a calculated move by Cassidy to expand beyond his teen idol image. AllMusic's Al Campbell wrote that the blue-eyed soul album was officially produced by Farrell, but the song selections and styles showed that Cassidy was also making decisions.

Cassidy's cover of the Young Rascals song "How Can I Be Sure" was included in the album, having peaked at number 3 on the US Adult Contemporary chart in June 1972 and #25 on the US Billboard Hot 100. It enjoyed greater success in the UK, holding number 1 status for two weeks in September.

The album's title track gained US airplay in early September 1972, rising to number 38 in mid-October. It was the album's high-energy opening track, a dip into brash glam rock. Following on "Rock Me Baby"'s heels, the album climbed to number 41 in the US through November–December, and then it entered the UK album charts very strongly at number 2 in late February 1973, starting a 17-week run for a total of 20 weeks on the chart.

The album contains one song written by Cassidy called "Two Time Loser", and a song he co-wrote with Kim Carnes titled "Song for a Rainy Day". The song "Rock Me Baby" was recorded around the same time by UK group Brotherhood of Man, but they shelved their release when Cassidy had a hit with it.

The album was reissued on Compact Disc by Arista Records in 2003.

== Track listing ==
1. "Rock Me Baby" (Johnny Cymbal, Peggy Clinger) 3:31
2. "Lonely Too Long" (Eddie Brigati, Felix Cavaliere) 3:24
3. "Two Time Loser" (Cassidy) 3:18
4. "Warm My Soul" (Joerey Ortiz) 3:00
5. "Some Kind of a Summer" (Dave Ellingson) 3:42
6. "(Oh No) No Way" (Peggy Clinger, Johnny Cymbal, Wes Farrell) 2:38
7. "Song for a Rainy Day" (Kim Carnes, Cassidy) 4:05
8. "Soft As a Summer Shower" (Adam Miller) 3:24
9. "Go Now" (Larry Banks, Milton Bennett) 3:08
10. "How Can I Be Sure" (Eddie Brigati, Felix Cavaliere) 3:10
11. "Song of Love" (Adam Miller) 3:34

== Production ==
- Produced By Wes Farrell
- Reissue Produced By Rob Santos
- Engineer: Bob Kovach
- Assistant Engineer: Winston Wong
- Digital Transfers: Tim Hunt
- Mastering: Elliott Federman

== Personnel ==
- David Cassidy - vocals, guitar, keyboards, percussion
- Hal Blaine, Jim Gordon - drums
- Gary Coleman, Alan Estes, Gene Estes - percussion
- Max Bennett, Joe Osborn - bass guitar
- Mike Melvoin - keyboards
- Larry Carlton, Dean Parks, Louis Shelton - guitar
- Kim Carnes, Dave Ellingson, Gwen Johnson, Marnell McCall, Lisa Roberts, Sally Stevens, Danny Timmes, Jackie Ward, Lorna Willard - additional vocals
- Carl Fortina - accordion
- Chuck Findley, Ollie Mitchell - trumpet
- Dick Hyde - trombone
- Robert Hardaway, Jim Horn, Tom Scott - woodwind
- John Bahler - vocal arrangements
- Mike Melvoin - string and horn arrangements
- Wes Farrell - rhythm arrangements
- Strings contracted by James Getzoff

Technical

- Ed Caraeff - photography

== Charts ==
=== Year-end charts ===
Chart (1973)	Position
German Albums (Offizielle Top 100)	11
