= Once Upon a Dream (The Rascals album) =

Studio album by the Rascals
- Released: February 8, 1968
- Recorded: September 8 – November 16, 1967
- Studios: Atlantic, A&R & Talentmasters, New York City
- Genres: Rock; psychedelic pop; psychedelic soul
- Length: 38:16
- Label: Atlantic
- Producer: The Rascals

The Rascals chronology
Groovin' (1967)	Once Upon a Dream (1968)	Time Peace: The Rascals' Greatest Hits (1968)

Singles from Once Upon a Dream
- 1. "It's Wonderful" Released: November 20, 1967

Once Upon a Dream is the fourth studio album by the rock band the Rascals, released February 8, 1968. The album rose to number 9 on the Billboard Top LPs chart, and number 7 on the R&B chart.

== History ==
Once Upon a Dream was the band's first album billed as "The Rascals"; they had, for legal reasons, been known as "The Young Rascals" until this time. It was also the last Rascals album to be available in both mono and stereo mixes.

The album was received differently by fans and critics. Many consider this album to be the band's best work, while others insist that it was too different from their traditionally rhythm and blues influenced music. Lead vocals came from both Eddie Brigati and Felix Cavaliere, as well as from Eddie's brother and unofficial band member David Brigati (on "Finale: Once Upon a Dream") and Gene Cornish on his own number, "I'm Gonna Love You."

In an interview with Melody Maker in 1967, Cavaliere stated, "Our new album, and I say this in a humble way, will be Sgt. Pepperish." The album uses frequent sound effects and spoken words between the songs.

A single of "It's Wonderful" (credited to "The Young Rascals," the band's last recording to be so billed) was issued November 27, 1967 and peaked at number 20 on the Billboard Hot 100 chart. The single version ends with a 50-second coda of "Mardi Gras"-style special effects and party sounds that were not included in the album version.

The album was reissued on CD August 28, 2007 by Collectors' Choice Music.

== Reception ==
Professional ratings
Review scores
Source	Rating
Allmusic	4/5 stars

In his review for Allmusic, music critic Thom Jurek, who highly praised the album, noted the influence of Sgt. Pepper's Lonely Hearts Club Band and wrote that the Rascals "put their own spin on it by adding their trademark blue-eyed soul and jazz influences to the mix of psychedelia... All details aside, though, a listen to this platter is startling. Its sophisticated orchestral and vocal arrangements are remarkable even in the 21st century... It's an under-celebrated masterpiece of the psychedelic era and belongs next to Pet Sounds and Sgt. Pepper's on the shelf because it is easily as sophisticated, and once heard in its entirety, can never be forgotten."

== Track listing ==
All songs are written by Felix Cavaliere and Eddie Brigati, except "I'm Gonna Love You" written by Gene Cornish. Track lengths adapted from the 2024 box set It's Wonderful: The Complete Atlantic Studio Recordings.

=== Side One ===
1. "Intro: Easy Rollin'" – 3:12
2. "Rainy Day" – 3:39
3. "Please Love Me" – 2:04
4. "Sound Effect" – 0:11
5. "It's Wonderful" – 2:31
6. "I'm Gonna Love You" – 2:17
7. "Dave & Eddie" – 0:16
8. "My Hawaii" – 4:09

=== Side Two ===
1. "My World" – 2:52
2. "Silly Girl" – 2:42
3. "Singin' the Blues Too Long" – 5:10
4. "Bells" – 0:09
5. "Sattva" – 4:16
6. "Once Upon a Dream" – 4:48

== Personnel ==
Personnel adapted from 2024 box set It's Wonderful: The Complete Atlantic Studio Recordings, unless otherwise noted.

The Rascals

- Felix Cavaliere – lead vocals ("Easy Rollin'", "Please Love Me", "My World", and "Singin' the Blues Too Long"), co-lead vocals ("It's Wonderful" and "Sattva"), sitar ("Sattva"), organ, piano; production
- Eddie Brigati – lead vocals ("Rainy Day'", "My Hawaii", and "Silly Girl"), co-lead vocals ("It's Wonderful" and "Sattva"), tamboura ("Sattva"), vocals, conga drums; production
- Gene Cornish – lead vocals ("I'm Gonna Love You"), guitar, bass; production
- Dino Danelli – drums, tabla ("Sattva"); production, cover design

Additional musicians

- David Brigati – lead vocals ("Once Upon a Dream"), additional vocals
- Ron Carter – bass guitar
- Richard Davis – bass guitar
- Chuck Rainey – bass guitar
- Melvin Lastie – trumpet
- King Curtis – tenor saxophone
- Steve Marcus – soprano saxophone
- Buddy Lucas – harmonica
- Hubert Laws – flute
- Gene Orloff – strings

Production

- Arif Mardin – arranger, conductor
- Tom Dowd – chief engineer
- Adrian Barber – sound effects engineer
- Chris Huston – engineer, tape op
- Bruce Tergesen – engineer, tape op
- Tunç Erim – tape op
- Joe Atkinson – dubs, mastering
- Phil Iehle – mastering
- Aileen Winter – liner notes
- Russel Beal – photography (Cover)
- Mark Roth – photography (Liner and booklet)
- Andrew Leo – photography (Booklet)

== Charts ==
Weekly chart performance
Chart (1968)	Peak position
US Billboard Top LP's	9
US Billboard Best Selling Rhythm & Blues LP's	7
US Cash Box Top 100 Albums	8
US Record World 100 Top LP's	8

Year-end chart performance
Chart (1968)	Peak position
US Billboard Top LP's	77
US Billboard Best Selling Rhythm & Blues LP's	41
US Cash Box Top 100 Albums	57
