= Once Upon a Dream =

Once Upon a Dream may refer to:

== Film and television ==
- Once Upon a Dream (1949 film), a British romantic comedy
- How I Married My High School Crush, a 2007 film which had the working title Once Upon a Dream
- Once Upon a Dream (TV series), a short-lived Australian children's series

== Music ==
- Once Upon a Dream (The Rascals album), 1968
  - * "(Finale): Once Upon a Dream", a 1968 song from the Rascals album
- Once Upon a Dream (Enchantment album)
- "Once Upon a Dream" (Sleeping Beauty song), the theme song of Aurora and Prince Phillip from the 1959 Disney film Sleeping Beauty
- "Once Upon a Dream" (Billy Fury song), 1962
- "Once Upon a Dream", a song from the musical Jekyll & Hyde and its prior concept albums
- "once upon a dream", a song from the video game Project Sekai

== Other uses ==
- Disney's Once Upon a Dream Parade, at the daily parade at Disneyland Park, which premiered on March 31, 2007 for the resort-wide 15th Anniversary Celebration
