= Collections (The Young Rascals album) =

Studio album by the Young Rascals
- Released: December 10, 1966
- Recorded: May 9 – November 11, 1966
- Studio: Atlantic and Talentmasters, New York
- Genre: Blue-eyed soul, garage rock
- Length: 32:21
- Label: Atlantic
- Producer: The Young Rascals

The Young Rascals chronology
The Young Rascals (1966)	Collections (1966)	Groovin' (1967)

Singles from Collections
- 1. "Come On Up" / "What is the Reason" Released: September 1, 1966; 2. "I've Been Lonely Too Long" / "If You Knew" Released: January 9, 1967

Collections is the second album by the rock band the Young Rascals. The album was released on December 10, 1966, and rose to #15 on the Billboard Top LPs chart, and to #8 in Canada.

== History ==
Collections was the Rascals' first album to showcase their songwriting talent, with six of the album's songs written by band members. On its original release, the song "Turn On Your Love Light" was incorrectly titled "Love Lights," and credited to The Sonics' bandleader Gerald (Gerry) Roslie, who had written a song called "Love Lights" for that band. Upon its release as a single, "I've Been Lonely Too Long" was credited to Cavaliere/Brigati, rather than to Felix Cavaliere alone.

The album featured a Top 20 U.S. hit: "I've Been Lonely Too Long" reached #16 on the Billboard Hot 100.

== Reception ==
Professional ratings
Review scores
Source	Rating
Allmusic	4/5 stars

In his review for Allmusic, music critic Bruce Eder wrote the "garage rock" sound of the band's first album was gone and called it a "wonderfully soulful body of music that picks up right where 'In the Midnight Hour' from the prior album left off. Most of this record is among the most danceable white rock music of its period..." The band was awarded a Gold Album in the United States for Collections.

== Track listing ==
Side one
No.	Title	Writer(s)	Lead vocals	Length
1.	"What is the Reason"	Felix Cavaliere; Eddie Brigati	Felix Cavaliere	2:23
2.	"Since I Fell for You"	Buddy Johnson	Eddie Brigati	3:25
3.	"(I've Been) Lonely Too Long"	Cavaliere	Cavaliere	2:57
4.	"No Love to Give"	Gene Cornish	Gene Cornish	2:42
5.	"Mickey's Monkey / Turn On Your Love Light"	Brian Holland, Lamont Dozier & Eddie Holland; Deadric Malone; Joe Scott	Cavaliere; Brigati	4:41
Total length:				16:08

Side two
No.	Title	Writer(s)	Lead vocals	Length
1.	"Come On Up"	Cavaliere	Cavaliere	2:41
2.	"Too Many Fish in the Sea"	Eddie Holland; Norman Whitfield	Cavaliere	2:16
3.	"More"	Riz Ortolani; Norman Newell; Marcello Ciorciolini	Brigati	4:20
4.	"Nineteen Fifty-Six"	Cornish; Dino Danelli	Cornish	2:28
5.	"Love Is a Beautiful Thing"	Cavaliere; Brigati	Cavaliere; Brigati	2:30
6.	"Land of 1000 Dances"	Chris Kenner	Brigati	1:58
Total length:				16:13

== Personnel ==
Personnel according to the 1988 re-issue of Collections, unless otherwise noted.

The Young Rascals

- Felix Cavaliere – organ, piano; lead vocals ("What is the Reason", "Lonely Too Long", "Come on Up", and "Too Many Fish in the Sea"), co-lead vocals ("Mickey's Monkey / Turn on Your Lovelights" and "Love is a Beautiful Thing"), production
- Eddie Brigati – percussion; lead vocals ("Since I Fell for You", "More", and "Land of 1000 Dances"), co-lead vocals ("Mickey's Monkey / Turn on Your Lovelights" and "Love is a Beautiful Thing"), production
- Gene Cornish – guitar, bass; lead vocals ("No Love to Give" and "Nineteen Fifty-Six"), production
- Dino Danelli – drums, percussion, production

Other personnel

- Tom Dowd – recording supervision, audio engineer (All tracks except "Land of 1000 Dances")
- Arif Mardin – recording supervision
- Phil Iehle – audio engineer (All tracks except "Land of 1000 Dances")
- Bruce Tergesen – audio engineer (All tracks except "Land of 1000 Dances")
- Bob Gallo – audio engineer ("Land of 1000 Dances")
- George Rodriguez – cover photography
- Loring Eutemey – cover design

== Charts ==
Weekly chart performance
Chart (1966–1967)	Peak position
Canada RPM Top 25 LPs	8
US Billboard Top LP's	14
US Billboard Top Selling R&B LP's	5
US Cash Box Top 100 Albums	15
US Record World 100 Top LP's	13

Year-end chart performance
Chart (1967)	Peak position
US Billboard Top LP's	15
US Billboard Top R&B LP's	25
US Cash Box Top 100 Albums	17

== Certifications ==
Certifications for Collections
Region	Certification	Certified units/sales
United States (RIAA)	Gold	500,000^{^}
^{^} Shipments figures based on certification alone.
