= How Can I Be Sure =

1967 single by the Young Rascals

- Italian picture sleeve

Single by the Young Rascals

from the album Groovin'
- B-side: "I'm So Happy Now"
- Released: August 28, 1967
- Recorded: June 22, 1967
- Studio: A&R Studios, New York
- Genre: Blue-eyed soul; pop
- Length: 2:50
- Label: Atlantic
- Songwriters: Felix Cavaliere; Eddie Brigati
- Producer: The Young Rascals

The Young Rascals singles chronology
"A Girl Like You" (1967)	"How Can I Be Sure" (1967)	"It's Wonderful" (1967)

Audio sample
- "How Can I Be Sure": file; help

"How Can I Be Sure" is a popular song written by Felix Cavaliere and Eddie Brigati, and originally recorded by the Young Rascals for their 1967 album Groovin', with a single release in August 1967 affording the group their fourth Top 10 hit.

"How Can I Be Sure" reached #4 on the Hot 100 in Billboard in October 1967, ranking as the most successful (Young) Rascals' hit featuring a lead vocal by Eddie Brigati.

The single's B-side, "I'm So Happy Now" (also included on the Groovin' album), was written and sung by Rascals guitarist Gene Cornish. Featuring a unique guitar phase-out ending, it was the first Cornish-penned song to appear on a Rascals single.

== Background ==
Of a rock-oriented band such as the (Young) Rascals introducing a traditional pop-style song such as "How Can I Be Sure" Cavaliere has stated: "The only reason we were brave enough to do that was [that] the Beatles did 'Michelle' and 'Yesterday'." Cavaliere had a special awareness of the Beatles, having toured Europe with them in 1963 when he was a member of Joey Dee and the Starliters; the Rascals would also open for the Beatles' 1965 US tour's kickoff concert at Shea Stadium on 15 August 1965. The track features the sounds of a trumpet, bass, piano, drums, and strings, suggesting the sounds of cabaret music as well as a concertina, chosen so as to add to the song the vibe of a French café. The song's musical styles include blue-eyed soul and pop.

"How Can I Be Sure" was one of several songs inspired by group founder Felix Cavaliere's girlfriend Adrienne Becchuri, a Pelham, New York, high school student Cavaliere met in 1966, the year he turned 24, of whom Cavaliere said: "turned out to be a muse… [R]eally the only reason she was in my life [was to] spark that kind of emotion and feeling that generates those types of songs." Cavaliere and Buccheri remained a couple for a year, with Cavaliere first celebrating Buccheri in the blissful Rascals' hits "Groovin'" and "A Girl Like You", and then with the introspective "How Can I Be Sure" expressing doubts about the relationship — he and Buccheri had recently become engaged — and despite the positive resolution of the song Cavaliere did in fact discover that she was too young, realizing: "What the hell am I doing? I'm going out with a kid."

== Chart performance ==
=== Weekly charts ===
Chart (1967)	Peak position
Australia (Go-Set)	23
Canada RPM Top Singles	1
New Zealand (Listener)	15
US Billboard Hot 100	4
US Cash Box Top 100	2

=== Year-end charts ===
Chart (1967)	Rank
Canada	36
US Billboard Hot 100	63
US Cash Box	51

== Dusty Springfield version ==
"How Can I Be Sure"

Single by Dusty Springfield

from the album The Dusty Springfield Anthology
- B-side: "Spooky"
- Released: September 4, 1970
- Genre: Pop
- Length: 2:47
- Label: Philips Records
- Songwriters: Felix Cavaliere, Eddie Brigati
- Producers: Johnny Franz, Dusty Springfield

Dusty Springfield singles chronology
"I Wanna Be A Free Girl" (1970)	"How Can I Be Sure" (1970)	"Lost" (1970)

"How Can I Be Sure" was covered by British singer Dusty Springfield and released as a non-LP single in September 1970. It was rumoured that this recording and single release may have been prompted by her well received performance of the song on the Des O'Connor Show in May 1970. Dusty was hopeful that this single would fare better than her then-recent American recordings which were met with relative indifference in the UK (aside from the US and UK Top 10 hit "Son of a Preacher Man").

Despite several promotional television and radio appearances and glowing reviews from the press, the single only spent one week in the UK Top 40 and only four weeks total on the chart. The song was issued specifically for the British market and would not be issued in America until the release of The Dusty Springfield Anthology in 1997.

Track listing

- Side A: "How Can I Be Sure" (2:47)
- Side B: "Spooky" (2:44)

"Spooky" is a cover of the Classics IV hit and was recorded in January 1968 but left unused for almost three years until it featured as the B-side to this single.

Charts

Chart (1970)	Peak position
UK Singles Chart	36

== David Cassidy version ==
"How Can I Be Sure"

Single by David Cassidy

from the album Rock Me Baby
- B-side: "Ricky's Tune"
- Released: May 1972
- Genre: Pop
- Length: 2:52
- Label: Bell Records
- Songwriters: Felix Cavaliere, Eddie Brigati
- Producer: Wes Farrell

David Cassidy singles chronology
"Could It Be Forever" (1972)	"How Can I Be Sure" (1972)	"Rock Me Baby" (1972)

Music video
- "How Can I Be Sure" on TopPop on YouTube

=== Background ===
In 1972 "How Can I Be Sure" was recorded for the album Rock Me Baby by David Cassidy (David Cassidy quote:) "Eddie Brigati and Felix Cavaliere [were] two of the great musical influences of my teenage years [when] I thought [the Rascals] were just about the best American pop band...[That song] brought back so many memories of that [time] for me." (Another Rascals hit, the Cavaliere/Brigati composition "I've Been Lonely Too Long", was also remade by Cassidy for Rock Me Baby; concurrent with the album's recording, Cassidy's producer Wes Farrell would acquire ownership of the entire Rascals song catalogue.) Released as the album's first single, "How Can I Be Sure" became the second of Cassidy's three Top 30 solo hits on the Billboard Hot 100 with a peak of #25, Cassidy's third Top 30 hit (and fifth and final Top 40 hit) being "Lyin' to Myself" eighteen years later in 1990. On the Billboard Easy Listening chart "How Can I Be Sure" peaked at #3.

"How Can I Be Sure" would afford Cassidy a #1 hit on both the Irish Singles Chart and (for two weeks) the singles chart for the UK, being the second of Cassidy's overall 11 UK chart hits, six of which would reach the Top Ten, including his second #1 UK hit: the double A-side hit "Daydreamer"/"The Puppy Song" (#1 for three weeks in 1973). "How Can I Be Sure" also charted with more moderate impact in Australia (#16), Canada (#22), Germany (#33), and the Netherlands (#13).

Track listing

- Side A: "How Can I Be Sure" (2:52)
- Side B: "Ricky's Tune" (3:24)

=== Chart history ===
==== Weekly charts ====
Chart (1972)	Peak position
Australia KMR	16
Ireland (IRMA)	1
UK Singles Chart	1
US Billboard Hot 100	25
US Billboard Easy Listening	3
US Cash Box Top 100	15

==== Year-end charts ====
Chart (1972)	Rank
Australia	144
UK	19
US (Joel Whitburn's Pop Annual)	182

== Other versions ==
- In late 1967, American singer Lesley Gore recorded a version for her 8th studio album, Magic Colors. Intended to be released that December, the project was instead shelved, and would remain unreleased until 2011.
- In 1967 French singer Nicoletta sold two million copies of the song, rendered as "Je ne pense qu'à t'aimer", the version which subsequently inspired Dusty Springfield's version.
- Also in 1967 a distinct French-language rendering, "A Paris la Nuit", was recorded by Quebec singer Michel Pagliaro with his band Les Chanceliers.
- Daryl Braithwaite released a version in October 1994 as the lead from his album Six Moons: The Best of 1988–1994. It peaked in Australia at #55 on the ARIA charts.
- Also in 1994 Gloria Estefan recorded the song for her cover version album Hold Me, Thrill Me, Kiss Me.
