= A Beautiful Morning =

- West German picture sleeve

Single by the Rascals
- B-side: "Rainy Day"
- Released: March 22, 1968
- Recorded: March 6 and 8, 1968
- Studio: A&R, New York City
- Genre: R&B; pop
- Length: 2:32
- Label: Atlantic
- Songwriters: Felix Cavaliere and Eddie Brigati
- Producer: The Rascals

The Rascals singles chronology
"It's Wonderful" (1967)	"A Beautiful Morning" (1968)	"People Got to Be Free" (1968)

"A Beautiful Morning" is a song written by Felix Cavaliere and Eddie Brigati and recorded by the Rascals. Released in early 1968, it was the group's first track released after shortening their name from the Young Rascals. The single was one of the earliest released in stereo, as 7-inch singles generally were in mono. Together with the Doors "Hello, I Love You", it's credited with changing the industry standard of singles.

The song continued the theme of carefree optimism that had distinguished the previous year's "Groovin'". It was written one morning in Honolulu, Hawaii when the band was invited to perform there by promoter Tom Moffatt. It became a big hit in the United States, reaching number 3 on the Billboard Hot 100 chart, and also reaching number 36 on the Hot Rhythm & Blues Singles chart. It was RIAA-certified as a Million Seller on June 28, 1968. The first album on which the song appeared was Time Peace: The Rascals' Greatest Hits.

== Chart performance ==
=== Weekly charts ===
Chart (1968)	Peak position
Australia KMR	36
Canada RPM Top Singles	1
US Billboard Hot 100	3
US Billboard R&B	36
US Cash Box Top 100	3

=== Year-end charts ===
Chart (1968)	Rank
Canada	15
US Billboard Hot 100	35
US Cash Box	17

== Certifications ==
Region	Certification	Certified units/sales
United States (RIAA)	Platinum	1,000,000^{‡}
^{‡} Sales+streaming figures based on certification alone.

== Other versions ==
Renée Geyer covered the song on her album Dedicated (2007).

== In other media ==
A modified version for this song was used by McDonald's during the late 80's "America's Morning Place" commercial series.

The song is featured in a Scrubs episode, at the start of a season 6 episode with Zach Braff, who plays J.D., dancing to it. It was also featured at the end of a second-season episode of The Greatest American Hero, in which Ralph had to disarm a nuclear missile. It was also featured in the movie Kingpin immediately following the scene that shows how Roy got his rubber hand.

The song was featured during the 1969 college graduation scene in The First Wives Club. It was also used in the 1993 movie A Bronx Tale opening the racetrack scene, as well as on Arrow at the end of the eighteenth episode of the fifth season, titled "Disbanded".

The song was also featured in season 3 episode 14 and season 5 episode 1 of The King of Queens. Sugar Pine 7 used it in the episode of the same name from their webseries Alternative Lifestyle in 2017. The song's opening lines featured prominently in a 2002 TV commercial for the (since-recalled) pain reliever Vioxx, which opens with an idyllic clip of former Olympic champion figure skater Dorothy Hamill, skating on a pond amid bright sunshine.

The song was used in The Simpsons episode Eternal Moonshine of the Simpson Mind (season 19, episode 9) during a fake telephone commercial.

It was also used with a cover in Bounce fabric softener ad campaign in the 1990s.

The song was used in a documentary of football club AFC Ajax about their 5-1 win over Liverpool F.C. in 1966.
