= Groovin' =

1967 single by The Rascals

- US picture sleeve

Single by the Young Rascals

from the album Groovin'
- B-side: "Sueño"
- Released: April 10, 1967
- Recorded: March 27, 1967
- Studio: Talentmasters, New York City
- Genre: Blue-eyed soul; baião
- Length: 2:30
- Label: Atlantic
- Songwriters: Felix Cavaliere; Eddie Brigati
- Producer: The Rascals

The Young Rascals singles chronology
"I've Been Lonely Too Long" (1967)	"Groovin'" (1967)	"A Girl Like You" (1967)

Audio
- "Groovin'" on YouTube

"Groovin'" is a song written by American singer-songwriters Felix Cavaliere and Eddie Brigati, initially recorded by their group the Young Rascals in 1967. Cavaliere was inspired to compose the song by his girlfriend Adrienne Buccheri, whom he only got to meet on Sundays amidst heavy touring and recording. Musically, the song differs from most of the band's previous output, leaving the garage rock genre for Latin American influences, such as baião. Lyrically, "Groovin'" tells the tale of a narrator spending time with his partner on a Sunday afternoon. The song was arranged and recorded at the Talentmasters Studios, New York City in March of 1967.

Initially, Atlantic Records were skeptical of releasing "Groovin'" as a single, given that it deviated from their previous output. After hearing it, the disc jockey Murray the K convinced Jerry Wexler to release it. "Groovin'" was released as a single on April 10, 1967, backed by "Sueño". It became a commercial hit, reaching number-one on the Billboard Hot 100 in May 1967. It peaked at number eight in the UK as the Young Rascals' only hit there.

Upon initial release, "Groovin'" received widespread critical acclaim by critics, who noted the new direction the Young Rascals took with the single. Owing to the success, it became the title track of the band's third studio album. Retrospective appraisal of the single have often noted the experimental nature of the single. Shortly after the release of the original, Booker T. & the M.G.'s recorded a cover that reached number 21 on Billboard Hot 100, while War and Pato Banton have seen success with their versions. The Young Rascals original version is on the 500 Songs that Shaped Rock and Roll list and has been awarded a Grammy Hall of Fame Award.

== Background and writing ==
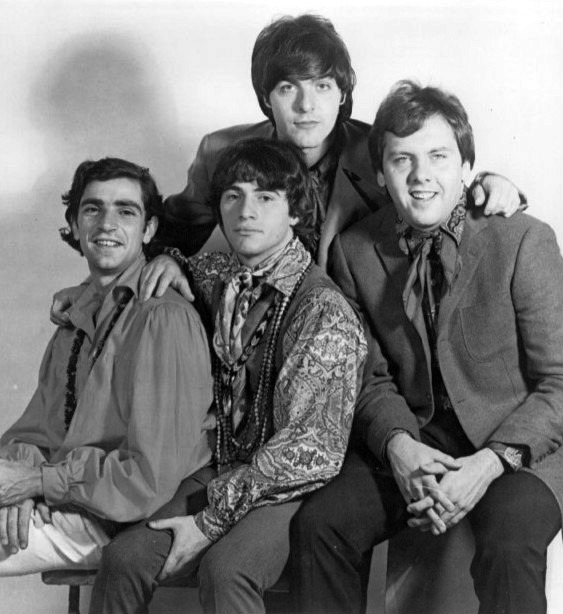
The Young Rascals in 1966.

In 1966, the Young Rascals rose to commercial prominence, reaching the number-one spot on the Billboard Hot 100 in May with their cover of "Good Lovin'". Though their debut single "I Ain't Gonna Eat Out My Heart Anymore" (1965), was of a similar vein, it was "Good Lovin'" that established what would be categorized as the Young Rascals musical style; a mix of garage rock and rhythm and blues that was personalized by Felix Cavaliere's blue-eyed soul vocals. The two singles following "Good Lovin'", "You Better Run" and "Come On Up" (both 1966) expanded upon this musical venture, the latter of which featured a "more aggressive sound" through Gene Cornish's fuzz guitar licks. Despite this, both singles were relative chart failures, reaching number 20 and 43 on the Billboard Hot 100, respectively. (Note: "Come on Up" became the Young Rascals worst performing single chart-wise during the 1960s, aside from "I Ain't Gonna Eat Out My Heart Anymore".)

Starting with "You Better Run", the Young Rascals singer Eddie Brigati and Cavaliere formed a songwriting partnership, where Brigati provided most of the lyrics while Cavaliere composed the music. Additionally, by early 1967 the Young Rascals attempted to move away from their initial rhythm and blues sound, expanding on it. Their January 1967 single "I've Been Lonely Too Long" abandoned Cavaliere's organ in favor of a more piano-based sound; this moved the band back into the Billboard top 20. Despite this, the band found the charting to be a commercial failure, having aimed for the single to become a top-ten hit, leading to the members wanting to revamp the group's image. Around the same time, Cornish would state that their follow-up single would be completely different, lacking organ, guitars or drums; instead basing their sound on conga drums, harmonica and sound effect of birds.

"Groovin'" was inspired by Cavaliere's then-girlfriend, Adrienne Buccheri, who according to him caused emotions that were "tailor-made to that style of music". In a later interview, Cavaliere stated that he believed Buccheri to be "divinely sent for the purpose of inspiring my creativity". The day of Sunday proved to be an additional general inspiration for Cavaliere in conceiving the song, as that was the sole day that he had a chance to spend time with Buccheri. Cavaliere states that "Groovin'" was a reflection of "the bliss I felt relaxing with her on Sunday afternoons, watching the world go by".

The musical content of "Groovin'" was largely derived from the time Cavaliere spent working at mountain resorts in Upstate New York, where he was introduced to Latin rhythms, something that compelled him. The song was composed at an upright piano in the shared apartment of Brigati and Cavaliere, before the duo collaborated on the lyrics. Brigati was tasked with writing the lyrics of "Groovin'" by Cavaliere because "he [Cavaliere] felt he [Brigati] was better at expressing Cavaliere's ideas". The lyrical ideas were initially conveyed by Cavaliere humming a tune, to which Brigati would attempt to write lyrics to fit them, before Cavaliere would re-arrange the lyrics to his preferred liking. With "Groovin'", however, Cavaliere did not make adjustment's to Brigati's lyrics since "that was the way it was".

== Composition ==
Lyrically, "Groovin'" is the evocation of a person in love through the laid-back perspective of someone who would do nothing but spend time with his romantic partner during a Sunday afternoon. The laid-back narrative is conveyed even though the narrator suggests to his partner that he'd like to walk through crowded avenues and meet strangers that are happy. However, the narrator laments the fact the Sunday afternoon will end, in dismay over the fact that it passed by so quickly. The phrase "you and me endlessly" which appears in the final verse was often misheard as the mondegreen "you and me and Leslie", which according to Caveliere was a result of his habit of slurring "uneven words to squeeze them in to fit the beats", something that was hampered by the fact that a conga fill appeared just as the word "endlessly" was sung.

Musically, as performed by the Young Rascals, "Groovin'" is performed in F minor, and has a BPM of 108. The song sports a clear structure, with the chorus repeated three times, supported by three verses. Structurally, it is largely composed of the chords of D and E♭ that are performed by Cavaliere on his piano during the choruses in a 6/8 time signature before alternating. During the verses, the chord of F♯ largely substitutes the chord of D, though also marks the appearance of the chords of G and A through a modulation that appears towards the end of the verses. "Groovin'" bears a strong inspiration from Afro-Cuban music, particularly concerning its baião rhythm and instrumentation which was unconventional for the band. It features the use of conga drums played by drummer Dino Danelli and tambourine by Cornish rather than a more standard drum set.

== Recording ==
Adding the sound of birds was my idea. I had heard the Beatles' "Yellow Submarine" and flipped. These guys had created a sound environment for their single. Ringo [Starr] sang about a sub—and there were sub sounds. Eddie and his brother David were experts at effects and they whistled the bird sounds. When we were just about finished, Arif suggested adding a harmonica—to drive home the carefree, Sunday feel. But I can't remember who played it.

— Felix Cavaliere (2013)

The recording session of "Groovin'" was held at the Talentmasters Studios on West 42nd Street in Manhattan, New York City on March 27, 1967. Though Atlantic Records had given the Young Rascals unlimited session time at their own Atlantic Studios, Cavaliere had requested that the session was held at Talentmasters, due to the fact that "many great R&B groups were making their singles" there; he additionally remembered the studio to have been a small box, something which "didn't matter as James Brown had recorded there". Besides the Young Rascals, present in the studio were Brigati's older brother David, the producer Arif Mardin and the engineer Chris Huston, who had been chosen to attend the session by David, who had known Huston while himself a member of Joey Dee and the Starliters in the early 1960s.

The structure of "Groovin'" was according to Cavaliere "mapped out" together with Mardin right before they entered the studio, with the decision of cutting the drums from the song having been taken during that moment. Additionally, Cavaliere had opted not to play his standard instrument, the hammond organ, on the recording. Instead, he opted to play the piano on the recording; the Carmen Cavallaro-inspired lounge piano performance during the song's instrumental break was orchestrated by Mardin in order to give the recording "a little bit more texture". Cavaliere states that Mardin helped with a lot of the arrangement and production of the song, even though the Young Rascals themselves were contractually credited as the producers.

The basic track of "Groovin'" was recorded by Cavaliere on vocals and piano, with Cornish on tambourine and Danelli playing a conga drum and woodblock. Cavaliere recalls that Danelli held the woodblock sticks under his arms while playing the conga, before using it to hit a wood block taped to the conga drum, creating a "ticking beat that sounded like a clock you ignored on a beautiful Sunday afternoon". Following the basic track's completion, Cavaliere overdubbed vibes and Cornish guitar while the Brigati brothers added their backing vocals. Though Cornish tried to overdub the song's bass line, he was unable to get precisely what Cavaliere had envisioned, so instead they called in session musician Chuck Rainey to perform the bass duties on the song. With time running out in the studio, Huston used one of Talentmaster's janitors, a local musician named Michael Weinstein, to overdub the harmonica performance of the song. Cornish would return to the studio a few weeks later to overdub his harmonica performance; this would be used for the stereo mix of the song.

== Release and commercial performance ==
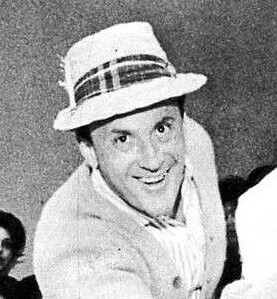
Cavaliere credits the disc jockey Murray the K with pressuring Atlantic Records into releasing "Groovin'"

After recording had been completed, Jerry Wexler, the head of Atlantic Records, was initially skeptical about releasing "Groovin'" as a single due to its vastly different musical style compared to the band's previous singles. The song was thus nearly shelved, had it not been for a chance meeting with disc jockey Murray the K. According to Cavaliere, Murray the K had been present during the recording session of "Groovin'". While listening to the playback of the song, he "went nuts" and stated that it was a "certain smash".

Wexler persisted in insisting that the Young Rascals at least added a conventional drum part to the record, to which Cavaliere insisted that it was a homage to the "whole world of Latin people out there who love to dance". The final straw in releasing "Groovin'" came from Murray the K, who spoke to Wexler only a few days after it was recorded. Murray the K convinced Wexler by stating that he would play it on his radio show, ensuring it would become a number one hit.

"Groovin'" was released in the US on April 10, 1967, backed by another song written by Cavaliere and Brigati, "Sueño". (Note: Catalogue number Atlantic 45-2401.) On the Billboard Hot 100, the single entered on April 22 at number 79. It peaked at number one a month later on May 20, becoming the Young Rascals' second number one single and top-ten entry on the Billboard Hot 100. It initially spent two consecutive weeks at number one before being dislodged by Aretha Franklin's cover of "Respect" on June 2. "Respect" spent two weeks at number one before "Groovin'" once again reached number one on June 17, staying there for two weeks. "Groovin'" dropped off the Billboard Hot 100 chart completely from a position of 38 on July 17. At the time, "Groovin'" beat the Billboard milestone of dropping off the charts entirely the fastest after reaching number one. Elsewhere in North America, "Groovin'" also reached number three on the Billboard Hot Rhythm & Blues Singles chart, along with topping the Cash Box top 100 singles and R&B chart. In Canada, it reached number one on both the RPM Top 100 and R&B chart.

In the UK, "Groovin'" was released on May 5, 1967. It entered the Record Retailer chart on May 31 at a position of 48, before peaking at number eight on July 4. It dropped off the charts on August 22 at a position of 48, having spent 13 weeks in total. "Groovin'" became the Young Rascals' only top-20 single in the UK. (Note: The Young Rascals only other charting single in the UK was "A Girl Like You", which reached number 37.) Elsewhere in the world, "Groovin'" became a top-twenty hit in Oceania, reaching number three in Australia and number 13 in New Zealand. In Africa, "Groovin'" reached the top-ten in both South Africa and Rhodesia, peaking at number ten and three respectively. Despite "Groovin'" finding massive commercial success on multiple continents, its commercial performance was lackluster in Continental Europe, where it failed to enter the top-ten on any national chart. It did reach the top-twenty in the Netherlands and West Germany, peaking at number 16 and 20 respectively.

Due to the massive popularity of "Groovin'", the single was chosen to be the title track of the band's third studio album, which was released by Atlantic Records on July 31, 1967. On mono copies of the album, the single version of "Groovin'" is included, while stereo copies include the alternate harmonica performance by Cornish. Fueled primarily by the success of "Groovin'", "A Girl Like You" and "How Can I Be Sure?" (both 1967), Groovin' reached number five on the Billboard 200, becoming their highest charting studio album. "Groovin'" has also appeared on most of the Young Rascals' compilation albums, the first of which was Time Peace: The Rascals' Greatest Hits that was released by Atlantic a year after the single on June 24, 1968. The album reached number one on the Billboard 200.

== Critical reception ==
Upon initial release in 1967, "Groovin'" received critical acclaim by critics, many of whom noted the apparent change in genres for the Young Rascals. The review panel in Billboard magazine noted it, considering it to be an "easy-go ballad" and "smooth summertime blockbuster" that was both aptly titled and better than their previous single. Billboard additionally predicted it to become a top-20 hit in the US. Cash Box magazine held a similar sentiment, the reviewer also noting the change in genres, with them stating it to be an "easy-going, smooth, rhythmic" ballad. Cash Box accurately predicted it to become a chart topper. The review panel for Record World magazine stated that "Groovin'" was a perfect record for teenagers to "do their dancing to". They awarded it a four-star rating.

Among British critics, Dave Munde of British group the Tremeloes found "Groovin'" to be a great song by a "tremendously underrated group" while reviewing for New Musical Express. Munden found the track great enough that he hoped the Tremeloes could record a cover of it. In a blind review for Melody Maker, disc jockey Pete Murray found "Groovin'" to be "the best record the Young Rascals have ever done", stating that it was "a great number" and that he otherwise didn't like the group's music. Some British critics additionally commented on the lyrical and musical tone of the song, including Richard Williams of The Guardian, who wrote that Cavaliere's "husky voice" gave "the tune a very sunny feeling", writing that the song was "beautiful". The lyrics were positively reviewed by the Whitstable Times, who called the song "slow" but predicted it to become the Young Rascals' first British hit.

== Retrospective assessment and legacy ==
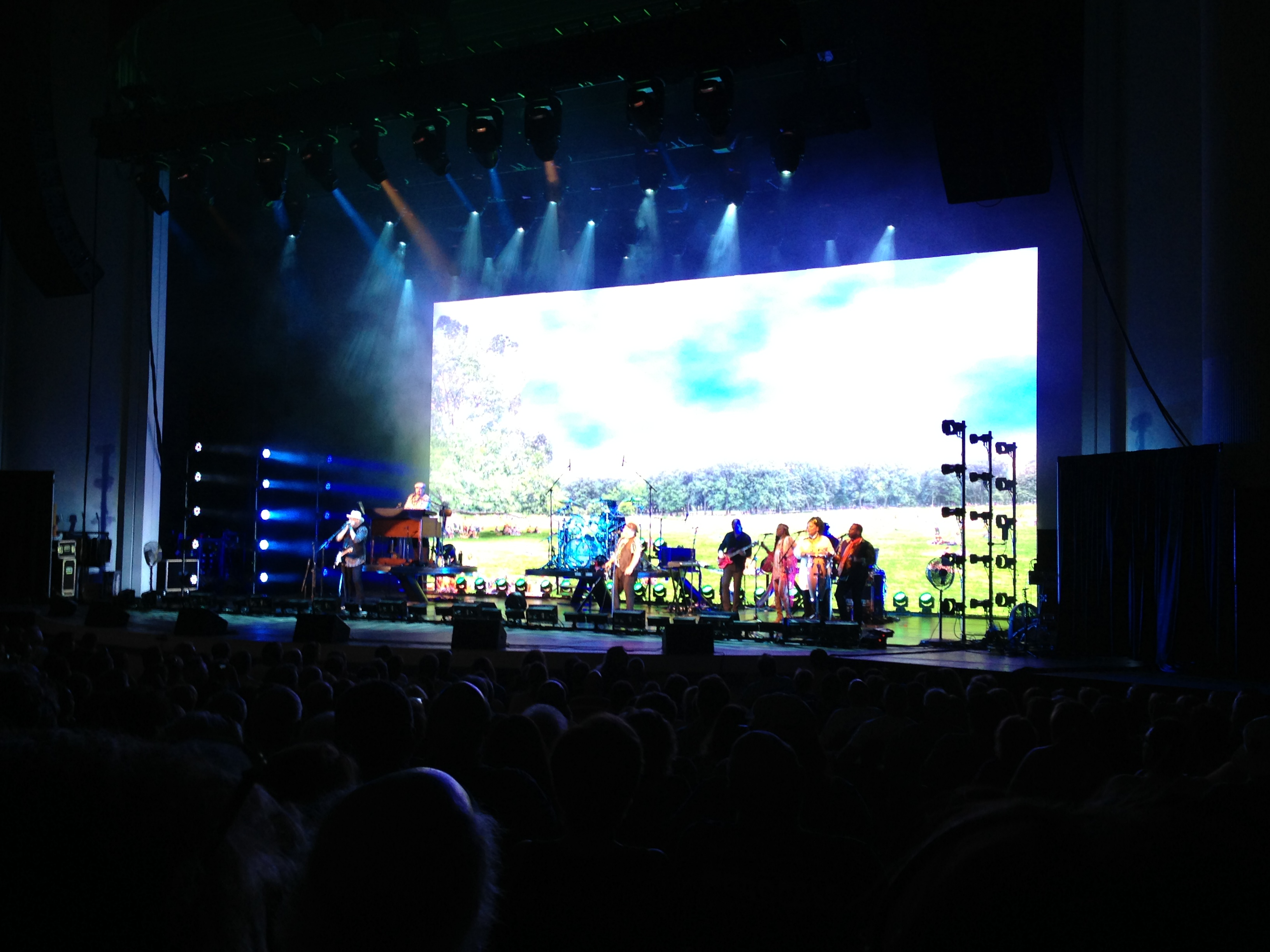
The Rascals performing "Groovin'" during their 2013 Once Upon a Dream show.

Retrospectively, "Groovin'" has also received praise from critics, with many noting the song to be an experimental endeavour for the Young Rascals who would continue releasing increasingly psychedelic and experimental music. AllMusic's Lindsay Planer stated that though the song retained the "same passion that drove" their previous singles, "Groovin'" was an "easy going ballad" that evoked a "pastoral setting with the novel inclusion of bird call sound effects".

According to reporter Parke Puterbaugh, "Groovin'" marked the gap between the Young Rascals earlier rhythm & blues-based music to more "mellower, sunnier and romantic" music. Journalist Marc Myers considers "Groovin'" to be a nod to the Young Rascals Latin American fans, owing to the strong influence from baião music the single has. Music critic Richie Unterberger states that the band's fans most likely were unprepared for how the Rascals changed up their music, with the song's "breezy feel" that he called as "carefree as a summer walk".

Despite being released during the spring of 1967, "Groovin'" peaked on the Billboard charts in May and June which Planer considered to be a "perfect promotion to the upcoming Summer of Love" phenomenon that would sweep across America during that summer. Puterbaugh states that it was a perfect record for "reflecting off of fire escapes and terraces" as "it was #1 as the day dawned upon the new rock era". Cornish states that the song gave the Young Rascals some slight newfound respect amongst underground hippie movements due to the more experimental, relaxed nature of it. "Groovin'" also prompted the Young Rascals to change up their appearance, switching up their clothing for "Nehru shirts, beards and beads", along with prompting them to drop the 'Young'-prefix from their named. (Note: The final release on which the band was labelled 'the Young Rascals' was "It's Wonderful", released in November 1967.)

The Young Rascals themselves were scheduled to appear on The Ed Sullivan Show twice owing to the success of "Groovin'", performing it live on June 4 and September 10, 1967 respectively. The song was an RIAA-certified gold record on June 13, 1967 for 500,000 copies sold. "Groovin'" is one of the Rock and Roll Hall of Fame's 500 Songs that Shaped Rock and Roll, and is also the recipient of a Grammy Hall of Fame Award.

== Covers ==
=== Booker T. & the M.G.'s version ===
"Groovin'"

Single by Booker T. & the M.G.'s

from the album Hip Hug-Her
- B-side: "Slim Jenkin's Place"
- Released: June 12, 1967
- Recorded: April 26, 1967
- Studio: Stax (Memphis)
- Genre: Instrumental rock; soul
- Length: 2:45
- Label: Stax
- Songwriters: Brigati; Cavaliere
- Producer: Jim Stewart

Booker T. & the M.G.'s singles chronology
"Hip Hug-Her" (1967)	"Groovin'" (1967)	"Winter Snow" (1967)

Audio
- "Groovin'" on YouTube

On April 26, 1967, Booker T. & the M.G.'s recorded an instrumental version of "Groovin'" at the Stax Recording Studios in Memphis, Tennessee, together with what would make up the majority of the group's fifth studio album Hip Hug-Her (1967). The recording was produced by Stax Records's co-founder Jim Stewart in what was his final recording session with the band.

The group's rendition of "Groovin'" is re-arranged to fit their more instrumental rock and soul-inspired sound, featuring a conventional drum kit played by Al Jackson Jr., while Donald "Duck" Dunn provides bass and Booker T. Jones mirrors the original's vocal line on the Hammond B-3 organ. On the recording, the band's guitarist Steve Cropper over-dubbed piano as well as his regular guitar. According to Unterberger, Booker T's rendition of the song was a tribute for the Young Rascals, who idolized the band and other rhythm and blues bands. "Groovin'" was initially released on May 23, 1967 as part of the Hip Hug-Her album, where it appeared as track three on the album's second side.

On June 12, 1967, while the Young Rascals original performance of "Groovin'" was at number two on the Billboard chart, Stax released Booker T. & the M.G.'s rendition of the song as a single, backed by "Slim Jenkin's Place", an original instrumental composed by the four members of the band. It debuted on the Billboard Hot 100 on August 5, 1967 at a position of 86, before reaching its peak of number 21 on September 23, 1967. It dropped off the charts on October 21, 1967, having spent 12 weeks on the charts. Elsewhere, it also peaked at number ten on the Billboard Hot Rhythm & Blues Singles charts, and also reached number two on the Canadian RPM chart. The B-side was the side that charted in the UK, reaching number 58 on the Record Retailer chart, and also reached number 70 on the Hot Rhythm & Blues Singles in the US.

=== Other renditions ===
In 1985, the American funk rock band War recorded a version of "Groovin'" for their album Where There's Smoke. Upon being issued as a single, their rendition reached number 30 on the U.S. Billboard Adult Contemporary chart in the spring of 1985 and number 79 on the Billboard Hot Black Singles chart.

In 1996, Pato Banton recorded a version with the Reggae Revolution that reached number 14 on the UK Singles Chart in July. The next month, the cover became a top-ten hit in New Zealand, reaching number four on the RIANZ Singles Chart and staying in the top 20 for nine weeks. It was the country's 47th-best-selling single of the year and received a gold sales certification for selling over 5,000 copies.

== Personnel ==
Personnel according to the liner notes of The Rascals: Anthology 1965-1972, unless otherwise noted.

The Young Rascals

- Felix Cavaliere – lead vocals, piano
- Eddie Brigati – backing vocals
- Gene Cornish – guitar, tambourine, harmonica (Album version)
- Dino Danelli – congas, woodblock

Other personnel

- David Brigati – backing vocals
- Chuck Rainey – bass guitar
- Michael Weinstein – harmonica (Single version)
- Chris Huston – engineer
- Arif Mardin – recording supervisor

== Charts ==
=== Weekly charts ===
Chart (1967)	Peak position
Australia (Go-Set)	4
Australia (Kent Music Report)	3
Canada Top 100 (RPM)	1
Canada Top 25 R&B (RPM)	1
France (SNEP)	78
Netherlands (Dutch Top 40)	19
Netherlands (Single Top 100)	16
New Zealand (Listener)	13
Rhodesia (Lyons Maid)	3
South Africa (Springbok Radio)	10
UK (Record Retailer)	8
US Billboard Hot 100	1
US Hot Rhythm & Blues Singles (Billboard)	3
US Cash Box Top 100	1
US Top 50 R&B (Cash Box)	3
US 100 Top Pops (Record World)	1
West Germany (GfK)	20

=== Year-end charts ===
Chart (1967)	Position
Canada Top 100 (RPM)	6
UK Singles (Record Retailer)	74
US Billboard Hot 100	9
US Cash Box Top 100	9
US Singles (Record World)	7

== Certifications ==
Certifications for "Groovin'"
Region	Certification	Certified units/sales
United States (RIAA)	Platinum	1,000,000^{‡}
^{‡} Sales+streaming figures based on certification alone.
