= Chris Huston =

British musician (born 1943)

Christopher John Huston (born 25 June 1943) is a British born record engineer, record producer and guitarist.

Huston arrived in Wallasey, near Liverpool, toward the end of World War II from an orphanage in North Wales. As a teenager he began studies at the Liverpool College of Art, where he became friends with John Lennon and, like Lennon, began copying the American R&B music imported through the city. In 1961 he joined The Undertakers, one of the leading local Merseybeat bands, as lead guitarist, shortly before Jackie Lomax joined as the group's singer.

The Undertakers released a string of singles in the early 1960s and toured widely, but had little chart success. They split up in the United States in 1965, and Huston stayed behind. Initially he toured as a member of Joey Dee and the Starliters, before linking up with The Young Rascals to start a new career as a record producer and engineer.

As engineer, he won a gold disc for the Rascals' "Groovin'", and in the late 1960s engineered a string of successful albums with The Who, Led Zeppelin, Todd Rundgren, Patti LaBelle and H.P. Lovecraft. He worked particularly extensively with Eric Burdon and War on their albums through the 1970s and 1980s, winning a Grammy Nomination for The World Is a Ghetto (1973). He also worked with James Brown, Ben E. King and many others.

Huston has subsequently become a consultant and lecturer on acoustics, building design, recording techniques and record production, based near Nashville, Tennessee.
