= You Better Run =

1966 single by The Rascals

- U.S. picture sleeve

Single by the Young Rascals

from the album Groovin'
- B-side: "Love Is a Beautiful Thing"
- Released: May 30, 1966
- Recorded: May 9, 1966
- Studio: A&R, New York City
- Genre: Rhythm and blues; blue-eyed soul; garage rock; proto-punk
- Length: 2:25
- Label: Atlantic
- Songwriters: Eddie Brigati; Felix Cavaliere
- Producers: The Young Rascals; Arif Mardin; Tom Dowd

The Young Rascals singles chronology
"Good Lovin'" (1966)	"You Better Run" (1966)	"Come on Up" (1966)

"You Better Run" is a song by the Young Rascals. Written by group members Eddie Brigati and Felix Cavaliere, it was released as the band's third single in 1966 and reached the top 20 in the United States. This song is noted for its repeated roller coaster musical chords in the bass guitar, going from C to B♭ to C to E♭ to B♭ to C.

== Critical reception ==
A review in a 1966 issue of Billboard magazine described the song as a "big-beat wailer" and a "strong follow-up to 'Good Lovin''". In the book Pioneers of Rock and Roll, author Harry Sumrall wrote that the song represented the apex of the band's sound and complimented guitarist Gene Cornish's "slashing chords". AllMusic's Matthew Greenwald called it "a classic garage rocker with a punkish energy [that] showcased the band's live chops to a great effect, as well as Felix Cavaliere's awesome soul-inflected vocals."

Music journalist Fred Bronson noted that "You Better Run" was a commercial disappointment, having peaked at number 20 on the U.S. Billboard Hot 100 after their previous single, "Good Lovin'", had reached number one. The Cavaliere and Gene Cornish composition "Love Is a Beautiful Thing" was the single's B-side.

== Chart performance ==
Chart (1966)	Peak position
Canada RPM Magazine	22
U.S. Billboard Hot 100	20
U.S. Cash Box Top 100	23

== Cover versions ==
=== Pat Benatar version ===
"You Better Run"
- German single picture sleeve

Single by Pat Benatar

from the album Crimes of Passion
- B-side: "Out-A-Touch"
- Released: July 8, 1980
- Studio: Sound City Studios (Van Nuys, CA)
- Genre: Hard rock
- Length: 3:04
- Label: Chrysalis
- Songwriters: Eddie Brigati; Felix Cavaliere
- Producer: Keith Olsen

Pat Benatar singles chronology
"Rated X" (1980)	"You Better Run" (1980)	"Hit Me with Your Best Shot" (1980)

Pat Benatar recorded "You Better Run" for her second album, Crimes of Passion (1980). The song was released as the album's lead single, with "Out-A-Touch" as the B-side. It peaked at number 42 on the U.S. Billboard Hot 100 chart and number 44 on the Cash Box Top 100. The song appeared on the soundtrack to the 1980 film Roadie.

On August 1, 1981, the music video for the song was the second video ever broadcast on MTV, after the network famously premiered with "Video Killed the Radio Star" by the Buggles.

==== Chart performance ====
Chart (1980)	Peak position
Australia (Kent Music Report)	31
Canada Top Singles (RPM)	76
France (IFOP)	55
New Zealand (RIANZ)	42
U.S. Billboard Hot 100	42

=== Other versions ===
In 1966, with the band Listen, Robert Plant made his recording debut singing lead vocals on a cover version of "You Better Run", which was released as a single by CBS Records.

In 1966, the N' Betweens, who later became the British rock band Slade, covered the song, which was released as their debut single on Columbia. It was produced by Kim Fowley and reached number one on the local Midlands chart and remained there for six weeks. The Listen and N' Betweens versions were released on the same day.

Canadian pop-rock band Toronto included a cover of "You Better Run" on their debut album, Looking for Trouble, in 1980.

Peter Criss recorded the song on his first post-KISS solo album, Out of Control, in 1980.

Bob Kuban & The In-Men recorded a cover as “You Better Run - You Better Hide,” on the Musicland USA label in 1967.
