= David Brigati =

American singer (1940–2026)

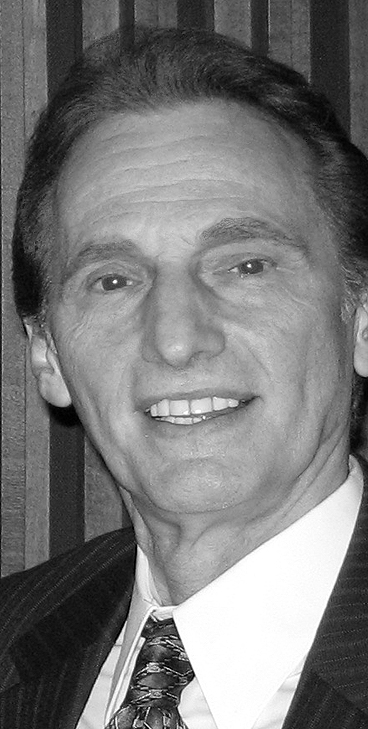
- Brigati in 2007

Background information
- Born: October 29, 1940; Garfield, New Jersey, U.S.
- Died: March 7, 2026 (aged 85) Montville, New Jersey, U.S.
- Genres: Rock; soul
- Instrument: Vocals
- Years active: 1958–2024
- Formerly of: The Starliters; The Rascals

David Brigati (October 29, 1940 – March 7, 2026) was an American singer. He was sometimes known as "the fifth Rascal".

== Life and career ==
=== Early life ===
Brigati was born on October 29, 1940 in Passaic, New Jersey, and raised in Garfield, New Jersey. His father Edward, was a whistler while his mother, Connie was a musician. He has a sister name Anne and a younger brother, Eddie Brigati. David was five years older than Eddie, and allowed Eddie to sing with him and his friends. Both boys learned Edward Sr.'s whistling skill, with both using bird calls in a few of their songs like "Groovin'".

He got his musical start as the lead singer of a doo-wop group known as the Hi-Fives. In 1958, the group recorded a number of songs on the Decca Records label. One of those recordings, "Dorothy", became a regional hit in the New York City/Philadelphia region. While with the Hi-Fives, Brigati began collaborating with Joseph DiNicola (known professionally as Joey Dee) of nearby Passaic, New Jersey, who sang back-up on a few of the Hi-Five recordings.

In late 1958, Dee recruited Brigati (after a gig at Garfield High School) to join his group the Starliters. Brigati became a lead singer with the group and his lead vocals can be heard on their first single release entitled "Face of An Angel".

In 1960, the Starliters became the house band for New York City's Peppermint Lounge. The 45th Street lounge was the inspiration for the Starliters hit "Peppermint Twist" and the group gained international fame.

=== 1964–1997 ===
Brigati left the Starliters in 1964 to pursue other interests. He was replaced by his brother, Eddie Brigati. Eddie (along with Starliters Felix Cavaliere and Gene Cornish) went on to form The Young Rascals. David Brigati was involved as a studio background singer with the Rascals. He sang lead on the title track of the Rascals' 1968 album Once Upon a Dream. His involvement with the group ended in 1970 when his brother left the group.

Brigati provided background vocals on the Average White Band's Soul Searching album in 1976. That same year, Brigati and brother Eddie recorded the album Lost in the Wilderness as "Brigati". The album included a disco version of the Rascals' hit "Groovin'". The brothers also sang at the Beacon Theater's show The New York Rock and Soul Revue: Live at the Beacon in 1991. Their rendition of "Groovin'" was included on the compilation recording.

When the Rascals were inducted into the Rock and Roll Hall of Fame in 1997 in Cleveland, Ohio, Brigati performed with the four original members of the group.

=== Later career ===
On April 24, 2010, Brigati appeared with the Rascals when they reunited again to perform at the Tribeca Grill in New York City in a show arranged by Gene Cornish. The reunion included Cornish, Dino Danelli, Eddie Brigati, and Paul Shaffer on keyboards. Eddie Brigati sang lead on the songs he sang originally, such as "How Can I Be Sure", and the brothers sang the songs which Felix Cavaliere originally sang. The reunion received favorable reviews and future shows were planned.

Also in 2010, Brigati reunited with Joey Dee and they along with Frankie Valli's brother Bobby performed as Joey Dee and the Starliters.

=== Death ===
Brigati died on March 7, 2026, at the age of 85.
