= It's Wonderful =

Single by The Young Rascals

from the album Once Upon a Dream
- B-side: "Of Course"
- Released: November 27, 1967
- Recorded: September 21, 1967
- Studio: A&R Studios, New York
- Genre: Psychedelic pop
- Length: 3:24
- Label: Atlantic
- Songwriters: Felix Cavaliere; Eddie Brigati
- Producer: The Young Rascals

The Young Rascals singles chronology
| "How Can I Be Sure" (1967) | "It's Wonderful" (1967) | "A Beautiful Morning" (1968) |

"It's Wonderful" is a popular song by The Young Rascals, and their last single under that name. Written by group members Felix Cavaliere and Eddie Brigati and with a dual lead vocal from them, it was included on the group's 1968 album Once Upon a Dream). It climbed as high as #20 on the Billboard Hot 100.

The single's B-side, "Of Course", did not appear on Once Upon a Dream, but would be held over for the group's next album, Freedom Suite.

== Chart performance ==
| Chart (1967) | Peak position |
|---|---|
| US Billboard Hot 100 | 20 |
