= The Rascals =

Blue-eyed soul band

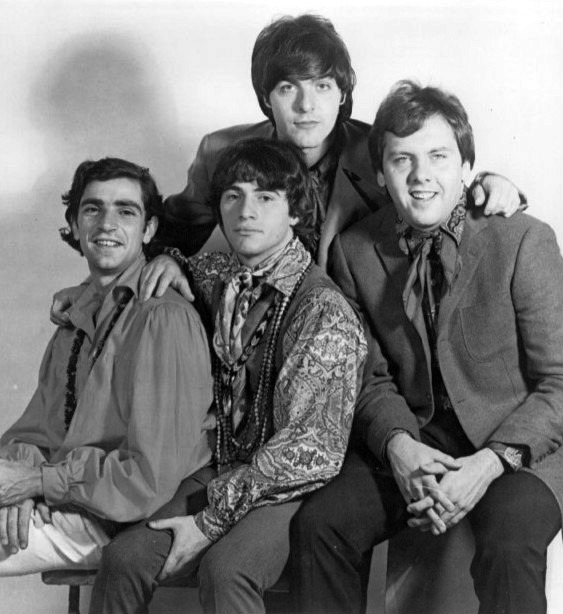
- The band in 1969; standing in back: Dino Danelli; sitting in front (L-R): Felix Cavaliere, Eddie Brigati and Gene Cornish

Background information
- Also known as: The Young Rascals (1965–1968)
- Origin: Garfield, New Jersey, U.S.
- Genres: Rock; blue-eyed soul; pop
- Years active: 1965–1972; 1988; 1997; 2010; 2012–2013; 2022–present
- Labels: Atlantic; Columbia
- Members: Felix Cavaliere
- Past members: Eddie Brigati; Dino Danelli; Gene Cornish; David Brigati; Robert Popwell; Danny Weis
- Website: therascalsarchives.com

The Rascals (originally known as the Young Rascals) are an American rock and blue-eyed soul band formed in Garfield, New Jersey, southeast of Paterson in 1965. The original lineup featured lead vocalist and keyboardist Felix Cavaliere, vocalist and percussionist Eddie Brigati, drummer Dino Danelli, and guitarist and vocalist Gene Cornish. Cavaliere and Brigati wrote the majority of the Rascals' original material.

Between 1966 and 1968 the band gained popularity with a blend of rock, pop and soul music. Nine of their singles charted in the top 20 of the Billboard Hot 100, including the No. 1s "Good Lovin'" (1966), "Groovin'" (1967), and "People Got to Be Free" (1968); as well as big radio hits like the much-covered "How Can I Be Sure?" (No. 4, 1967) and "A Beautiful Morning" (No. 3, 1968). Another critical favorite, "A Girl Like You" (No. 10, 1967), became an early example of the blue-eyed soul genre. Additionally, four of the band's LPs received gold certifications in the US, including the top 10 albums Groovin' (1967) and Once Upon a Dream (1968). The group continued into the early 1970s after the departures of Brigati and Cornish, with Cavaliere leading the Rascals in a more album-oriented direction with strong jazz and funk influences.

The Rascals were inducted into the Rock and Roll Hall of Fame in 1997 and the Hit Parade Hall of Fame in 2010, and the classic lineup also reunited in 2012 for a series of shows in New York and New Jersey. The reunion continued in 2013 with shows on Broadway. Cavaliere and Cornish began performing again as the Rascals in 2022 without Brigati and Danelli, the latter of whom died the same year.

== History ==
=== Origins ===
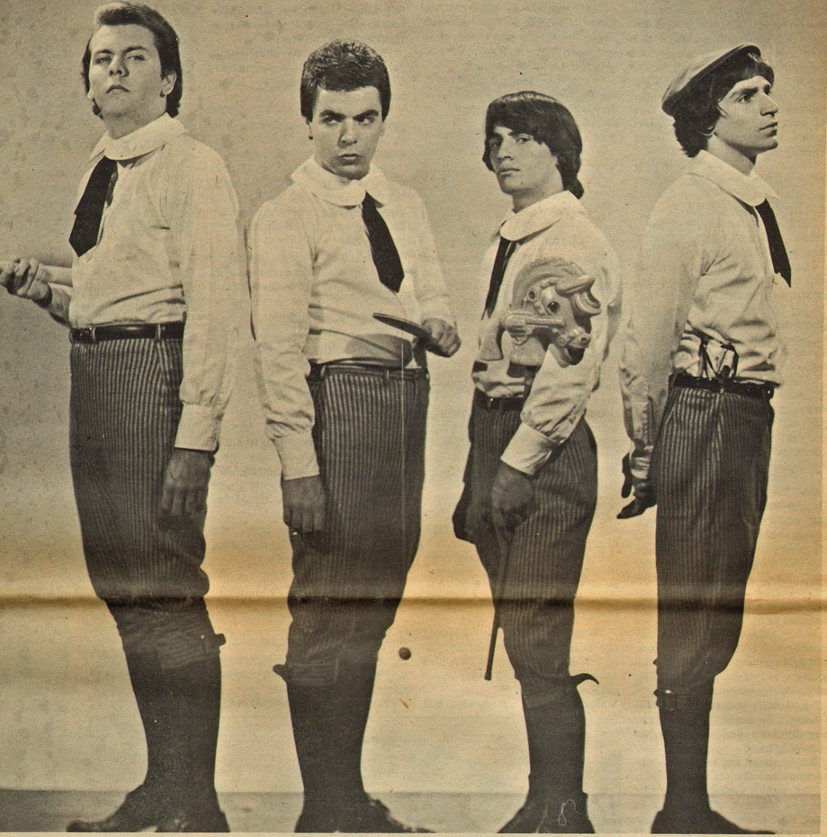
The Young Rascals featured on February 12, 1966, issue of KRLA Beat. Left to right: Cornish, Danelli, Brigati, Cavaliere

Felix Cavaliere was already trained in classical piano by his mother when he founded a doo-wop group, the Escorts (not the R&B group with the same name), while enrolled at Syracuse University in Syracuse, New York. In 1964, Cavaliere took a job with Joey Dee's backing band, the Starliters of "Peppermint Twist" fame, where he met Starliter David Brigati. When the group played the Choo Choo Club in Garfield, Cavaliere met Brigati's younger brother, Eddie, who wanted to follow in his brother's footsteps. Cavaliere, in an interview with journalist Don Paulson, spoke about when he first met the younger Brigati:

I saw a little kid walk into the place. He didn't look old enough to go out of his house alone. He used to walk into the [Choo Choo] club and no matter who was singing, get on the stage, and bury them with his voice. We made an impression on each other. He used to come around every once in a while, and I loved to play behind his singing. I told him that someday we were going to get together.

Canadian guitarist Gene Cornish left his group, The Unbeatables, for which he acted as frontman, to join the Starliters, in early 1965. After meeting Cornish, Cavaliere's interest in forming a band of his own led him to convince both Cornish and (Eddie) Brigati to depart from Dee's backing band to start a new one with an old acquaintance of his, jazz drummer Dino Danelli. The group came up with the name "Rascals" while at the Choo Choo Club. Prior to the Rascals name they were using another group name "Them". Because there was another group, which included Van Morrison, using the name "Them" in the UK they dropped that name and came up with The Rascals name through the help of TV comedy star Soupy Sales whom they met through manager Billy (Amato) Smith. The Rascals were Sales' back up band touring local colleges in the early months of 1965.

The Rascals began rehearsing at Cavaliere's house in Pelham Manor, New York east of Yonkers and then the Choo Choo Club, mostly because it was close to Brigati's home and they needed a showcase. Later in May 1965, under the direction of their manager Billy (Amato) Smith, they were hired to do a summer engagement at the debut of The Barge, a floating club by Dune Road in Westhampton Beach, New York. They settled at the club in eastern Long Island and there developed their mixed R&B-soul sound based on Cavaliere's organ and soulful vocals, mostly filled with traditional R&B covers. The quartet did not have any official bass player, because of Brigati's inability to play musical instruments, other than percussion (even when the band bought him a Fender Mustang Bass in 1967) and the Rascals' wish of staying in the formula of four members. Cavaliere's organ pedals (and later, session bassists like Chuck Rainey, in studio recordings) filled the bass parts.

At the Barge club in August 1965, manager Billy (Amato) Smith, who discovered them at the beginning of their music career as the Rascals, introduced the group to Sid Bernstein, an impresario known at the time for helping to promote the British Invasion, bringing famous UK bands like the Beatles and the Rolling Stones to America. Promoting the band, Bernstein and Smith came up with the publicity stunt of posting the phrase "The Rascals are coming!" at the Shea Stadium's scoreboard, at the same time that the Fab Four were doing the opening of their 1965 North American tour. Beatles manager Brian Epstein ordered the post to be removed before his band arrived on the stage.

A lot of people who hadn't seen pictures of them thought they [the Rascals] were a R&B group. I sensed something big about them with the thanks to Billy (Amato) Smith.

— Sid Bernstein

This event helped the group to get a $15,000 contract with Atlantic Records, a label which mainly had black artists, and they became the first white-only act to be signed at Atlantic. Bernstein managed them for the next five years with Billy (Amato) Smith as their publicist and promotion advisor. The contract also stipulated that the band could self-produce their records. But problems arose when they discovered that another group, Borrah Minnevitch's and Johnny Puleo's Harmonica Rascals, objected to their release of records under the name The Rascals. To avoid conflict, Bernstein decided to rename the group The Young Rascals, possibly because all the members were under 25.

=== Commercial success and songwriting development ===
The line-up of Brigati on lead vocals, Cavaliere on organ, Cornish on guitar and Danelli on drums was present in the Young Rascals' debut single, the Pam Sawyer/Lori Burton "I Ain't Gonna Eat Out My Heart Anymore", which was performed in their first television performance on the program Hullabaloo on February 24, 1966. But the track reached only No. 23 in Canada and did not reach the Top 40 of the US chart. After the modest success of "Eat Out My Heart Anymore", Cavaliere assumed the lead vocals on their subsequent records, starting with its follow-up "Good Lovin'", originally recorded by Lemme B. Good and The Olympics in 1965, with the same arrangement and different lyrics from the original. Ironically, David Brigati had been the lead singer of the Starliters, but never had any hits; once Joey Dee had a hit with "The Peppermint Twist" he took over the lead vocals. History repeated itself when Felix replaced Eddie as the Rascals' lead singer. They performed "Good Lovin'" on The Ed Sullivan Show. The Young Rascals version became their first Canada/USA No. 1. Shortly after, their eponymous debut album was released, mostly composed of garage rock renditions of folk rock ("Just a Little" and "Like a Rolling Stone"), and soul tunes ("Mustang Sally" and "In the Midnight Hour"), with only one original, the Cavaliere/Cornish penned "Do You Feel It". The Young Rascals reached No. 15 on the Billboard Top LPs chart and No. 10 in Cashbox. The album was certified Gold by the RIAA.

From there the songwriting partnership between Felix Cavaliere and Eddie Brigati began to flourish. Cavaliere wrote the music and themes, and Brigati, the verses with the former's help. Their second album, December 1966's Collections, had four Cavaliere/Brigati songs and two Cornish originals in its eleven tracks. Follow-ups to their number one record, "You Better Run"–later covered by Pat Benatar in 1980 – and "Come On Up", did not do as well as their predecessor (peaking at No. 20 and No. 43, respectively). The band made their UK debut on December 1, 1966, at The Scotch of St. James club in London. Paul McCartney attended the concert and was so excited by the band that he also attended their show the following night, held at the Blaises Club.

In the meantime, Cavaliere began dating high school student Adrienne Bechurri. Their relationship inspired him to write several songs in 1967, including Top 20 "I've Been Lonely Too Long" and Top 10's "How Can I Be Sure", and "Groovin'", their second No. 1. "Groovin'", having its laid-back sound and an Afro-Cuban groove, found some resistance with Atlantic's head Jerry Wexler; "I've Been Lonely Too Long" and the jazz-influenced "A Girl Like You" talked about the advantages of a relationship against loneliness, but the introspective "How Can I Be Sure", with Brigati's lead vocals, expressed the doubts about love, like Cavaliere's conflicting feelings about Bechurri. All these songs were included on the Groovin' album, which had the majority of the tracks penned by Cavaliere/Brigati. Bruce Eder, writing for AllMusic, rates Groovin' as the Rascals' best, noting the record's soulful core and innovative use of jazz and Latin instrumental arrangements.

Groovin' marked the first time that the Young Rascals used outside musicians, bringing some important collaborators like Chuck Rainey, Hubert Laws, and David Brigati to augment their sound. Particularly, David Brigati also helped his brother's band in arranging vocal harmonies and singing background on many Rascals records. The band, especially Cavaliere, wanted to depart from their "singles act" label to be more like an "albums act", something that would become common to more artists at the late 1960s. The album Once Upon a Dream, released at 1968, is an example of this change, because it was the first Rascals album designed from conception as an album, rather than as a vehicle to package their singles (eight of Groovin''s eleven songs had been released as single A- or B-sides, most in advance of the album). Once Upon a Dream also incorporated Indian music in its sound, adding Eastern instruments like sitar, tamboura, and tabla. David Brigati made a special appearance on the album, singing lead on the title track. The psychedelic "It's Wonderful" was released before the album, but its different style from their earlier singles hindered its sales, and the single only reached No. 20. The album's song "My Hawaii" became a top-of-the-charts hit in Hawaii.

The band billed themselves as the Young Rascals for the last time with the single release of "It's Wonderful"; from that point on they were known as simply The Rascals. Their first single release as the Rascals was 1968's optimistic "A Beautiful Morning", which reached No. 3. Internationally, the band was exceptionally popular in Canada, where "A Girl Like You", "How Can I Be Sure?" and "A Beautiful Morning" all reached No. 1. But they struggled in the UK, where they only twice reached the top 75, with "Groovin'" (No. 8) and "A Girl Like You" (No. 35).

Time Peace: The Rascals' Greatest Hits, released in mid-1968, topped the U.S. album chart and became the group's best-selling album. In the same year, "People Got to Be Free", a horn-punctuated plea for racial tolerance (the band was known for refusing to tour on segregated bills) just months after the assassination of Martin Luther King Jr. and of Robert F. Kennedy, became their third and final U.S. No. 1 single, and their sixth and final Canadian No. 1. It was also their final U.S. Top Ten hit, although they remained a Canadian top 10 act for the next few years.

In 1969, the Rascals released the double album Freedom Suite. An album with one LP dedicated to "conventional" songs and another to instrumentals, it should have been the band's definitive change to produce more ambitious albums, according to Richie Unterberger. But Freedom Suite was their last Top 40 album, peaking at No. 17. Brigati's songwriting contributions were diminished on this album, in favor of Cavaliere's solo compositions, as well his vocals, singing lead only on two songs on Freedom Suite. Brigati's participation declined even more in later albums.

=== Commercial waning and demise (1969–1972) ===
"A Ray of Hope", "Heaven", "See", and "Carry Me Back" followed and were all modest U.S. hits for the band during late 1968 and 1969; they entered the top 40, but none rose higher than No. 24. In Canada, however, the Rascals were still major stars; all these songs went top ten, completing a run of 11 straight Canadian top ten hits for the Rascals from 1967 to 1969. December 1969's "Hold On" broke the run of top 40 US singles for the Rascals, stalling at No. 51, as well as the run of Canadian top tens, peaking at No. 22.

Brigati left the group in 1970, followed by Cornish in 1971. Their last Rascals album was Search and Nearness (No. 198 U.S.), which featured Brigati's lead vocals on the Cornish-penned "You Don't Know", a cover of the Box Tops' hit "The Letter", and drummer Danelli's composition "Fortunes". The only single release from the album to chart was the spiritually themed "Glory, Glory" (No. 58 U.S., No. 40 Canada), with backing vocals by The Sweet Inspirations. Search and Nearness was the Rascals' last album for Atlantic Records, with Cavaliere and Danelli taking the band to Columbia Records in mid-1971.

Cavaliere shifted towards more jazz- and gospel-influenced writing for the Rascals' next two albums, the double disc Peaceful World (U.S. No. 122) and The Island Of Real (U.S. No. 180), using Robert Popwell and Buzzy Feiten on bass and guitar respectively, and new singers Annie Sutton and Molly Holt. These albums did not sell as well as their earlier work, with none of their associated singles reaching higher than No. 95 on the U.S. chart. Towards the end of 1970 Danny Weis joined as a replacement for Feiten on guitar. Feiten then again replaced Weis before the group disbanded.

== Post break-up ==
Cavaliere released several solo albums during the 1970s. Brigati, with his brother David, released Lost in the Wilderness in 1976. Cornish and Danelli worked together in Bulldog, who released two albums—one for MCA Records in 1973 with the minor hit single "No", the second for Buddah in '74—and Fotomaker, who released three albums on Atlantic in 1978–79. In 1982, Danelli joined Steve Van Zandt in Little Steven and the Disciples of Soul for the group's first two albums.

After appearing at Atlantic Records 40th anniversary celebration on May 14, 1988, the Rascals reunited with Cavaliere, Cornish, and Danelli for a brief reunion tour in 1988. The reunion group featured an expanded lineup including Mel Owens (in Brigati's place) on vocals and percussion, Scott Spray on bass, Michael Mugrage on guitar, Dena Iverson and Cindy McCabe on backup vocals, and a horn section from Nashville to beef up the sound. The reunion did not last beyond the end of the year. After that, Cavaliere returned to his solo career, and in the 1990s there were two factions touring: The New Rascals (featuring Cornish and Danelli) and Cavaliere, who sometimes called his grouping Felix Cavaliere's Rascals. The New Rascals lasted only a short time but toured again in 2006 with two new members, Bill Pascali (formerly of Vanilla Fudge) on vocals and keyboards and Charlie Souza on bass and vocals. The New Rascals released a concert DVD, shot at club Centro in New Jersey on Route 35.

The Rascals were inducted into the Rock and Roll Hall of Fame on May 6, 1997. Steve Van Zandt gave the induction speech and presented the award. All four original members appeared together to perform "Good Lovin'", "Groovin'", "How Can I Be Sure?", and "People Got to Be Free". In early 2009, Eddie Brigati put together a project of young musicians who played all the classics. He performed with the group along with his brother David. Called The Boys From The Music House, the band consisted of Anthony Duke Claus, a cousin of Eddie's on lead vocals and tambourine; Joseph Pomarico on lead guitar, harmonica and background vocals; Adam Sullivan on piano, organ, and background vocals; and Matt Gazzano on drums.

== Reunions and Danelli's death (2012–present) ==
On April 24, 2010, all four members of The Rascals reunited for the Kristen Ann Carr benefit, which was held at Tribeca Grill in Manhattan; Bruce Springsteen and Stevie Van Zandt joined the band for a closing "Good Lovin'".

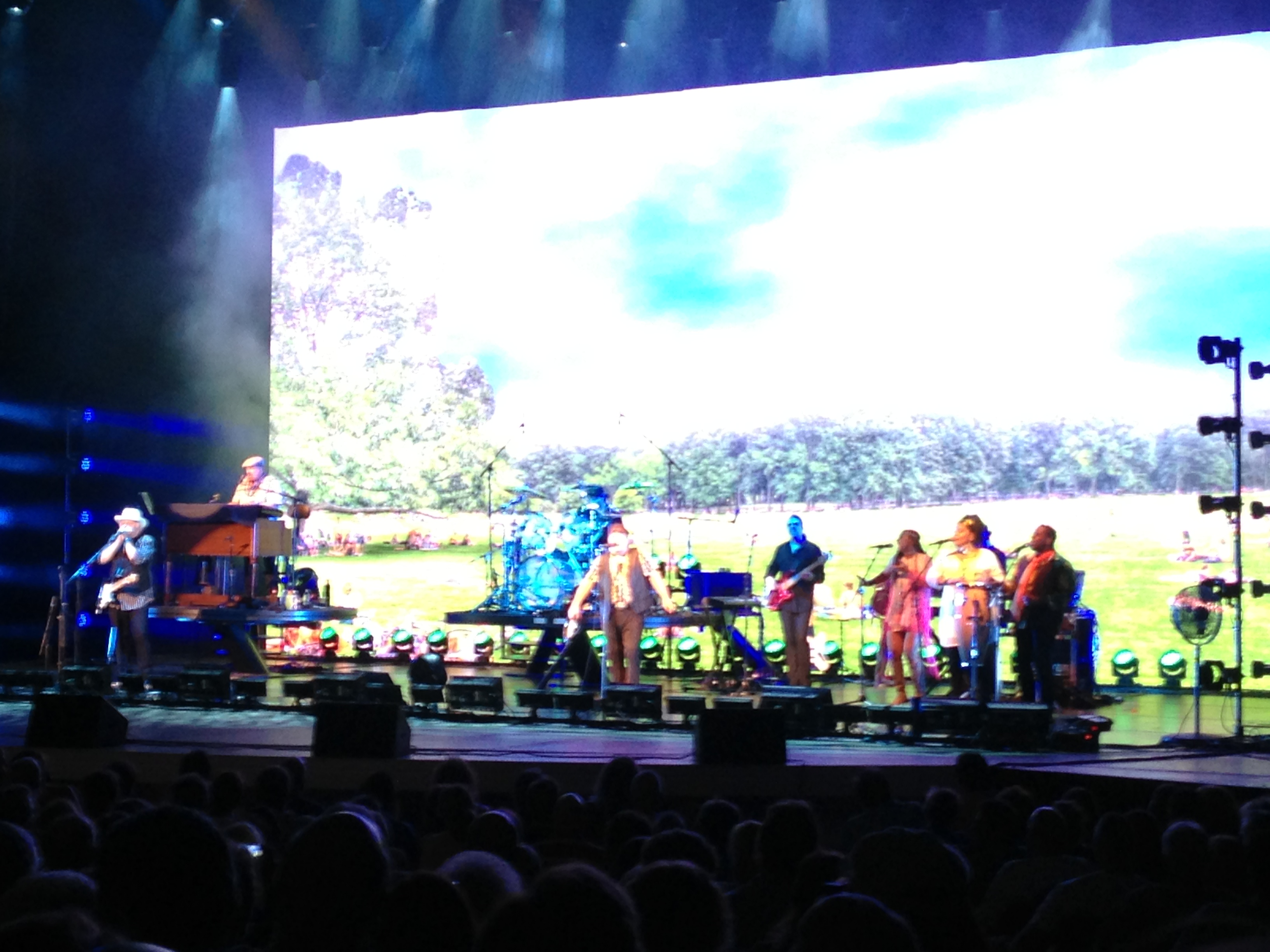
The Rascals performed "Groovin'" during one of their Once Upon a Dream shows in 2013. The large video screen helped accentuate song themes and showed interviews with members and re-enactments of the group's history. Left to right, Gene Cornish, Felix Cavaliere, Dino Danelli, Eddie Brigati, and various supporting players and singers

The group's original lineup reunited in 2012 for their first public performances since 1988 (other than one-off reunions in 1997 and 2010) with The Rascals: Once Upon a Dream, a combination concert/theatrical event that was produced and directed by Steven Van Zandt and Maureen Van Zandt with lighting/projection by Marc Brickman. In addition to the concert experience, the history of The Rascals, and the history of the 1960s through their music, the production features a combination of interviews with the four Rascals, filmed scenes of actors enacting key moments in the band's history, news footage, and archival footage of the band. The show originally ran for six performances in December 2012 at the Capitol Theatre in Port Chester, New York.

The show had fifteen performances from April 15 to May 5, 2013, at the Richard Rodgers Theatre on Broadway in New York City. Near the end of the show's Broadway run, it was announced that Once Upon a Dream would be taken on the road, with performances scheduled in various cities on the East coast of North America for a six-month tour during May–November 2013. After its national tour, the show was expected to return to Broadway for a second three-week limited-run from December 2013 through January 2014, at the Marquis Theatre, but it was canceled. Later in 2014, Cavaliere returned to performing as Felix Cavaliere's Rascals with The Lovin' Spoonful as their opening act. Both Cavaliere's Rascals and The Lovin' Spoonful served as opening acts for a concert by The Beach Boys in Jones Beach on Long Island on July 5, 2014. In 2018, Cornish collapsed and suffered cardiac arrest while performing in Billings, Montana. After recovering in 2020, he published the memoir Good Lovin': My Life as a Rascal.

In October 2022, in an interview with Rock Cellar Magazine, Cornish announced that he would be reuniting with Cavaliere later that month (and into 2023) for the "Time Peace Tour" (though Cornish was unable to perform at the tour's first show). Interviewer Frank Mastropolo expressed surprise that the two were reuniting again, to which Cornish commented that the group had never expected to reunite in 2012 and 2013 (after the original lineup first split in 1972).

Cornish also revealed that he and Cavaliere wanted the Once Upon a Dream reunion to continue in late 2013 and into 2014. Cornish said that Danelli "had a lot of demands that we couldn't meet" and "was coming up with excuses," while "Eddie [Brigati] didn't want to do it any more" With regards to their upcoming reunion, Cornish said that "Dino [Danelli] is incapable of playing drums anymore [and] is in a long-term facility... Eddie turned us down again." Danelli died from coronary artery disease and congestive heart failure on December 15, 2022, at a rehabilitation facility in Manhattan, after a period of declining health. He was 78. In 2023 and 2024, Cavaliere and Cornish have continued to perform together as the Rascals (sometimes credited as "the Rascals featuring Felix Cavaliere and Gene Cornish"). Their 2024 dates were billed as the "People Got To Be Free Tour 2024"; at least some 2024 dates again featured the Lovin' Spoonful as an opening act, similarly to Cavaliere's tour with them in 2014.

== Legacy ==
The Rascals were inducted into the Rock and Roll Hall of Fame on May 6, 1997. Steve Van Zandt gave the induction speech and presented the award. All four original members appeared together to perform "Good Lovin'", "Groovin'", "How Can I Be Sure?", and "People Got to Be Free". In 2005, the Rascals were inducted into the Vocal Group Hall of Fame. In August 2007, the Rascals' catalog of Atlantic Records albums was re-released by Atlantic Records affiliate Rhino Records.

On June 18, 2009, Eddie Brigati and Felix Cavaliere were inducted into the Songwriters Hall of Fame. The ceremony was held at the Marriott Marquis Hotel in New York City, where a brief reunion took place with the founder of The Rascals, Billy (Amato) Smith. "Groovin'" has been inducted into the Grammy Hall of Fame.

== Members ==
=== Current members ===
- Felix Cavaliere – lead and backing vocals, keyboards (1965–1972, 1988, 1997, 2010, 2012–2013, 2022–present)

=== Former original members ===
- Eddie Brigati – backing and lead vocals, percussion (1965–1970, 1997, 2010, 2012–2013)
- Dino Danelli – drums (1965–1972, 1988, 1997, 2010, 2012–2013; died 2022)
- Gene Cornish – backing and lead vocals, guitar, harmonica, occasional bass guitar (1965–1971, 1988, 1997, 2010, 2012–2013, 2022–2026)

=== Unofficial members and later additions ===
- David Brigati – backing and occasional lead vocals (1965–1970; died 2026)
- Annie Sutton – vocals (1970–1972)
- Molly Holt – vocals (1970–1972)
- Robert Popwell – bass guitar (1970–1972; died 2017)
- Buzzy Feiten – guitar (1970, 1971–1972)
- Danny Weis – guitar (1970–1971)

=== Touring members ===
- Mel Owens – vocals, percussion (1988)
- Scott Spray – bass (1988)
- Michael Mugrage – guitar (1988)
- Dena Iverson – backing vocals (1988)
- Cindy McCabe – backing vocals (1988)
- unspecified horn section – horns (1988)

=== The New Rascals ===
- Gene Cornish – vocals, guitar, harmonica (1990s, 2006)
- Dino Danelli – drums (1990s, 2006)
- Bill Pascali – vocals, keyboards (2006)
- Charlie Souza – vocals, bass (2006)

=== Felix Cavaliere's Rascals ===
- Felix Cavaliere – vocals, keyboards (1990s–2012, 2013–2022)
- Scott Spray - bass (1987–1989)
- Michael Mugrage - guitar, vocals (1987–1988)
- Joey Melotti - keyboards (1987–1988)
- Jay Stollman - vocals (1987–1988)
- Sarah Brooks - vocals (1987–1988)
- Jimmy Vivino - guitar, vocals (1988–1989)

=== The Boys from the Music House ===
- Eddie Brigati – vocals (2009)
- David Brigati – vocals (2009)
- Anthony Duke Claus – lead vocals, tambourine (2009)
- Joseph Pomarico – backing vocals, lead guitar, harmonica (2009)
- Adam Sullivan – backing vocals, piano, organ (2009)
- Matt Gazzano – drums (2009)

=== Groovin’ with Gene Cornish of The Rascals ===
- Gene Cornish - guitar, vocals (2017–2018)
- Jay Stollman - lead vocals, keyboards (2017–2018)
- Steve Gaspar - keyboards, vocals (2017–2018)
- Scott Spray - bass (2017–2018)
- Vito Luizzi - drums (2017–2018)
- Joseph Pomerico - guitar, vocals (2017–2018)

== Discography ==
- The Young Rascals (1966)
- Collections (1966)
- Groovin' (1967)
- Once Upon a Dream (1968)
- Freedom Suite (1969)
- See (1969)
- Search and Nearness (1971)
- Peaceful World (1971)
- The Island of Real (1972)
