= I've Been Lonely Too Long =

1967 song by Felix Cavaliere and Eddie Brigati

Single by the Young Rascals

from the album Collections
- B-side: "If You Knew"
- Released: January 9, 1967
- Recorded: December 30, 1966
- Studio: A&R, New York City
- Genre: Blue-eyed soul
- Length: 2:57 (album): 2:04 (single)
- Label: Atlantic
- Songwriter(s): Felix Cavaliere, Eddie Brigati
- Producer(s): The Young Rascals

The Young Rascals singles chronology
"Come On Up" (1966)	"I've Been Lonely Too Long" (1967)	"Groovin'" (1967)

"I've Been Lonely Too Long" is a song written by Felix Cavaliere and Eddie Brigati and performed by the Young Rascals. Released as a single in 1967, it reached #7 in Canada, while in the U.S. it reached #16 on the Billboard Hot 100 chart, #17 on the Cashbox Top 100 chart, and #33 on the Hot R&B Singles chart. It was also featured on their 1967 album Collections, where the title is given as "Lonely Too Long".

The rhythm track is based on The Temptations hit "Ain't Too Proud to Beg", released the previous year (1966).

The song was produced by The Young Rascals and ranked #54 on Billboard magazine's Top 100 singles of 1967.

== Other versions ==
- Byrdie Green, on her 1967 album I Got It Bad (And That Ain't Good).
- Mercy, on their original Sundi Records album Love (Can Make You Happy).
- The Brooklyn Bridge, on their 1968 album Brooklyn Bridge.
- The Fireballs, on their 1969 album Come On, React!
- David Cassidy, on his 1972 album Rock Me Baby.
- Richie Furay, as a single in 1979 in the UK; it did not chart.
