= Eddie Brigati =

American singer and songwriter (born 1945)

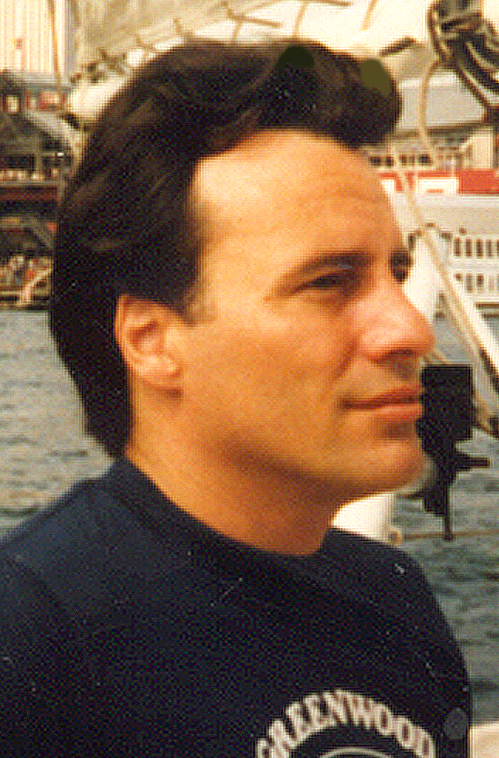
- Brigati in May 1984

Background information
- Born: Edward Brigati Jr. October 22, 1945 (age 81); Garfield, New Jersey, USA
- Genres: Rock; soul; blue-eyed soul
- Occupations: Singer; songwriter
- Instruments: Vocals; percussion
- Years active: 1965–present

Edward Brigati Jr. (born October 22, 1945) is an American singer and songwriter most known for being a founding member of the rock group The Young Rascals, for whom he shared lead vocals and chief songwriting responsibilities with Felix Cavaliere and also was a percussionist, from 1964 to 1970.

Prior to his stint with The Young Rascals (who later shortened their name to The Rascals), Brigati had been a member of Joey Dee and the Starliters (having replaced his brother, original Starliter David Brigati, in that group). With the help of group founder Billy (Smith) Amato and manager Sid Bernstein, the Rascals became the first all-white group signed to Atlantic Records. They (along with The Righteous Brothers and The Box Tops), were practitioners of a genre of music coined 'blue-eyed soul'.

== Early life ==
Edward Brigati Jr. was born and raised in Garfield, New Jersey to his father Edward and mother Connie. He has a sister Anne and an older brother. His older brother, David Brigati, who was 5 years older than Eddie, inspired him to get into music. David would let Eddie sing with him and his friends when Eddie was around 11. Other than his brother, Edward Sr. was a whistler while Connie was a musician. Both boys learned Edward Sr.'s skill, with both using bird calls in a few of their songs like "Groovin'".

Brigati graduated from Garfield High School in 1963.

== Career ==
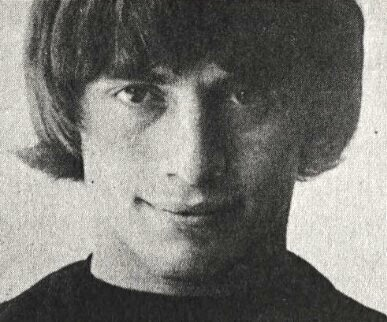
Headshot of Brigati in 1967

Brigati and fellow group member Felix Cavaliere wrote the songs that made the Rascals one of the more successful recording groups of their era. He helped to compose "You Better Run", "I've Been Lonely Too Long", "Groovin'", "How Can I Be Sure", "A Beautiful Morning", and "People Got to Be Free". In the Brigati and Cavaliere songwriting partnership, Brigati was primarily a lyricist. According to Cavaliere, during their writing sessions, Brigati was good at writing the verses of songs while Cavaliere would compose the music and devise the song titles and general themes.

In terms of the group's singles, Brigati sang the lead vocal on the Young Rascals' first, "I Ain't Gonna Eat Out My Heart Anymore" (1965), sang co-lead on "Love is a Beautiful Thing" (1966 B-side, but included on the contemporarily released album Time Peace: The Rascals' Greatest Hits) and "It's Wonderful" (1967), and, most well known, sang the lead on "How Can I Be Sure" (1967, a top five hit). Although Cavaliere would have most of the group's lead vocal roles, Brigati was frequently heard in harmony parts.

Brigati left the group in 1970 after their contract with Atlantic expired, and they chose to sign with Columbia. Why exactly Brigati departed has long been a point of contention; a 1988 story in the Los Angeles Times says that: "Cavaliere depicted Brigati as a man who inexplicably resigned from the Rascals in 1970 and has since resisted promoters’ efforts to put the former band members together for a reunion tour. Brigati cast Cavaliere as an opportunist who turned a band that had been organized as an equal collective into his own vehicle."

In 1976, Eddie and David Brigati recorded an album, Lost in the Wilderness, under the name Brigati. They also performed on The New York Rock and Soul Revue: Live at the Beacon in 1992.

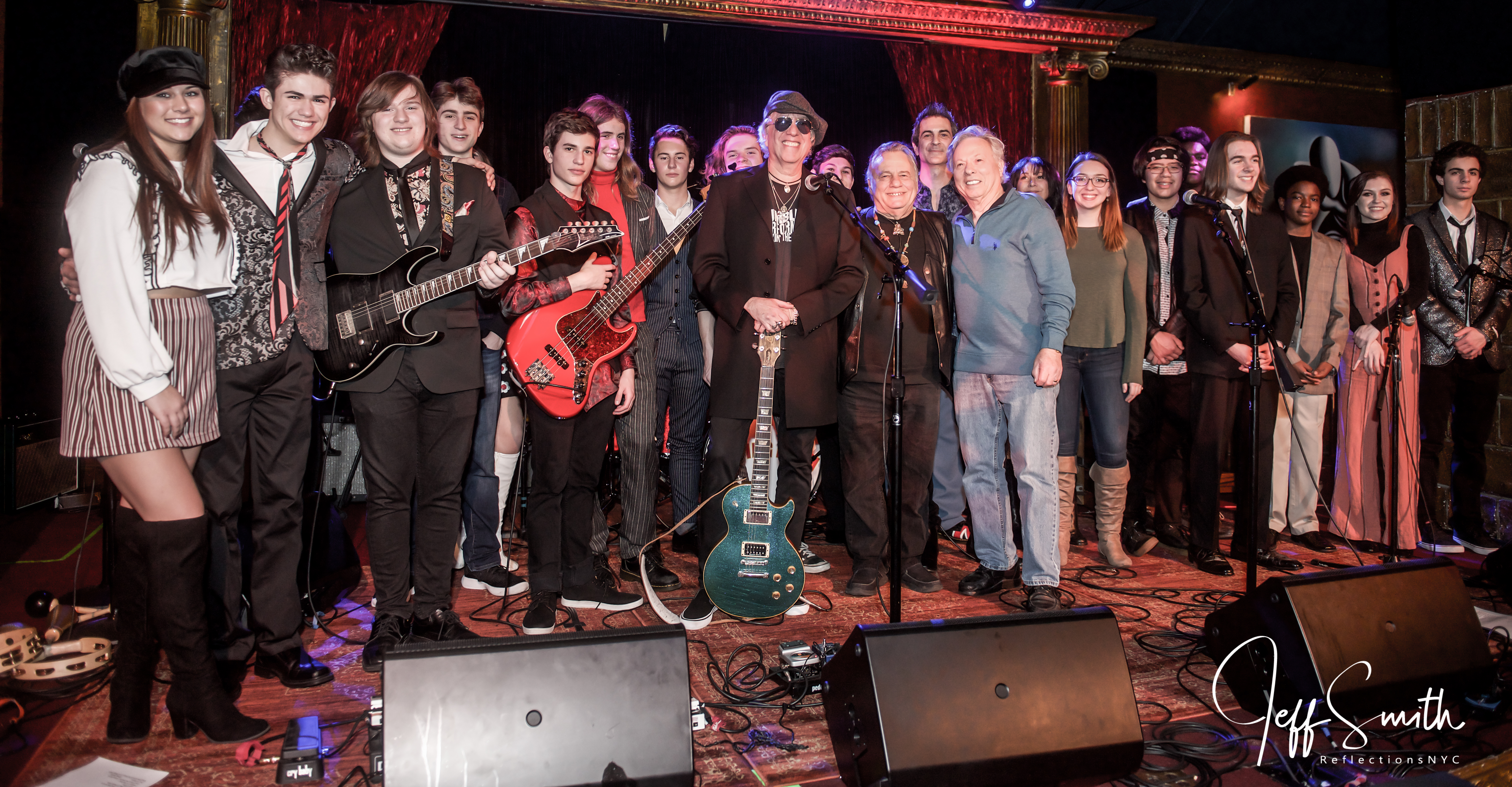
Eddie Brigati with Ricky Byrd at The Cutting Room in New York in 2018, for a Rockit tribute to the singer Steve Marriott

The (Young) Rascals were inducted into the Rock and Roll Hall of Fame in 1997 and in 2005, the Vocal Group Hall of Fame. On June 18, 2009, Brigati (along with partner Cavaliere) was inducted into the Songwriters Hall of Fame. On April 24, 2010, Brigati reunited with the other three members of the Rascals. They performed at the Kristen Ann Carr benefit (held at New York City's Tribeca Grill). The quartet played a set that ran over one hour and featured several of their top hits from the 1960s.

He reunited with his band-mates in 2012. The Rascals appeared at the Capitol Theater in Port Chester, New York for six shows in December 2012 and for fifteen dates at the Richard Rogers Theatre on Broadway (April 15 – May 5, 2013). The production was entitled 'Once Upon A Dream' and was produced by long-time Rascals' fans, Steven Van Zandt and his wife Maureen. They toured around the country for seven months after Broadway, playing summer amphitheaters and other venues. After that, the members of the group went their separate ways again.

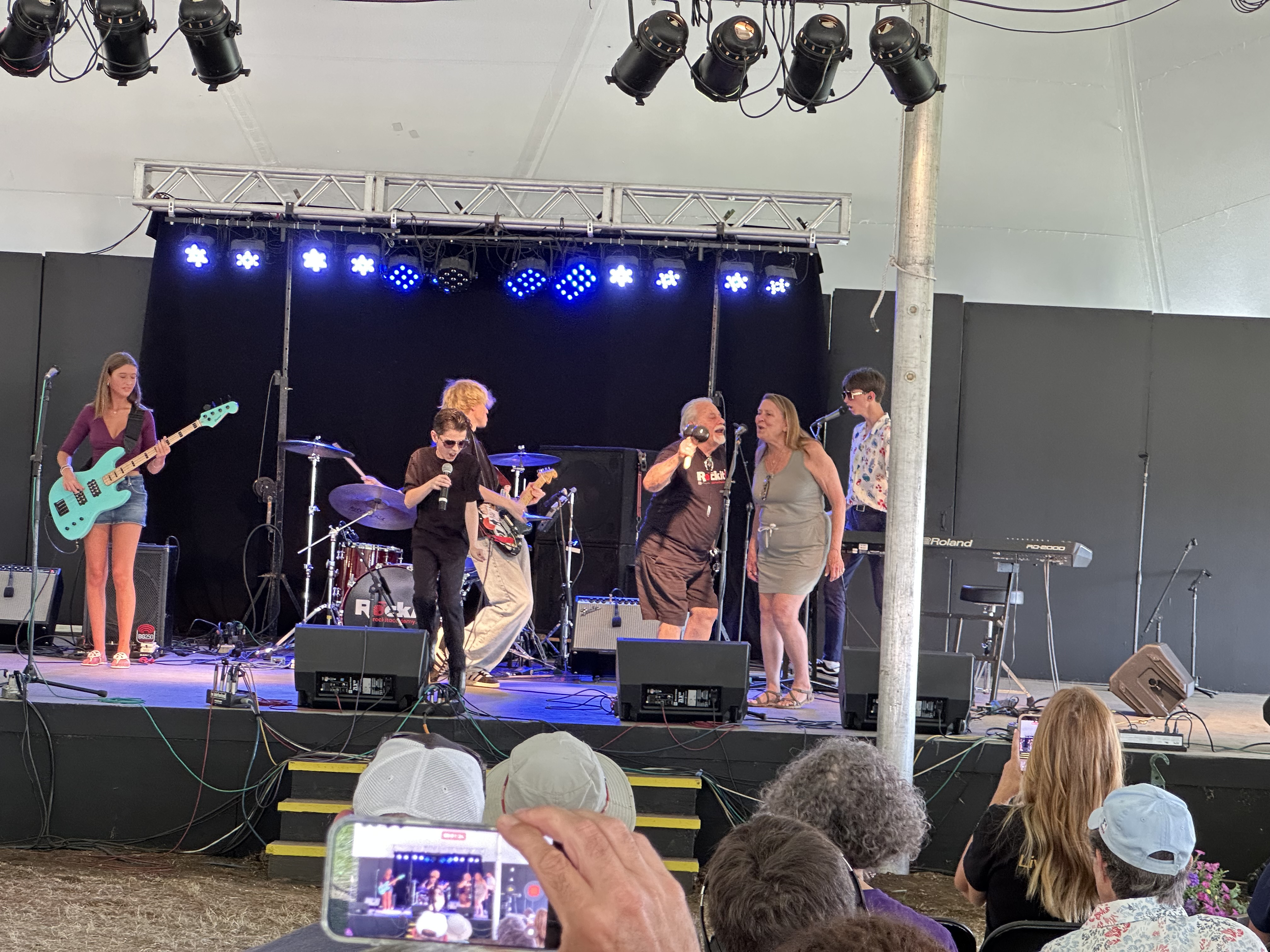
Eddie Brigati and his wife Susan sing on a Rockit Academy performance of "Good Lovin'" at the Monmouth County Fair in 2026

Brigati subsequently became involved with the Rockit Live Foundation, a New Jersey-based nonprofit that seeks to nuture young musicians interested in playing rock music and that runs the Rockit Academy for the training and showcasing of these musicians. Brigati and his wife Susan became members of the Artist Advisory Board of the Rockit Live Foundation.

== Personal life ==
Brigati and his wife, Susan Lovell, reside in his home state of New Jersey.
