= Gene Cornish =

Canadian-American musician (born 1944)

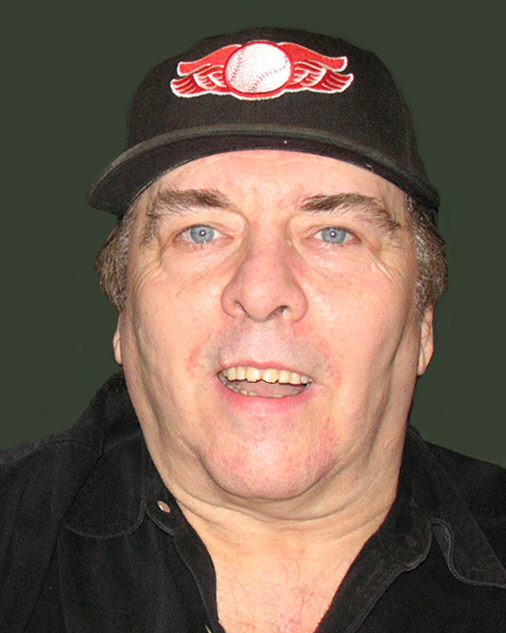
- Cornish in 2010

Background information
- Born: May 14, 1944 (age 81); Ottawa, Ontario, Canada
- Origin: New Jersey, U.S.
- Genres: Rock, soul, blue-eyed soul
- Occupation: Musician
- Instrument(s): Guitar, harmonica, vocals, bass guitar
- Years active: 1965–present
- Website: felixcavaliereandgenecornishsrascals.com

Gene Cornish (born May 14, 1944) is a Canadian-American musician. He is an original member of the popular 1960s blue-eyed soul band The Young Rascals. From 1965 to 1970, the band recorded eight albums and had thirteen singles that reached Billboard's Top 40 chart. In 1997, as a founding member of The Rascals, Cornish was inducted into the Rock & Roll Hall of Fame.

== Early life ==
Early in his life, Cornish and his mother moved from Ontario to Rochester, New York. He became a talented guitar and harmonica player at a young age. In his later teen years (early 1960s) he made the rounds of the local clubs and bars in his area and worked with a number of bands (even performing as a single artist on occasion).

== Career in music ==
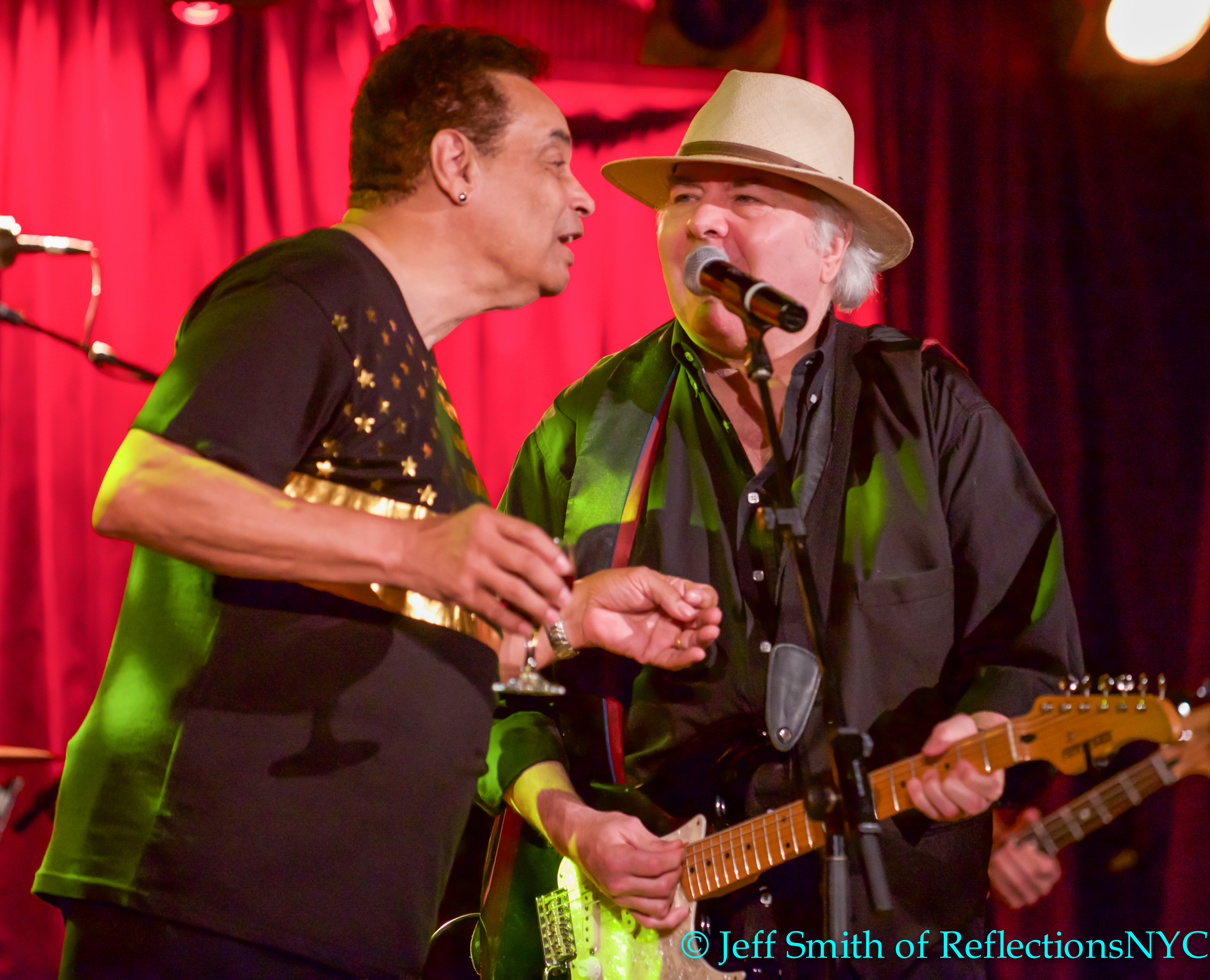
The Rascals' Gene Cornish at B.B. King's Club for Gary U.S. Bonds' 70th birthday party

In 1962, Gene Cornish with The Gene Cornish Nobles released "Winner Take All" backed with "Since I Lost You" on Vassar 319. As the composers of the latter, "R. Cornish – G. Cornish" is printed on B side label. It was well-made in the manner of white doo-wop (arranged by Lew Douglas).

Cornish became a member of Joey Dee and the Starliters in 1964. During that period, he met vocalist Eddie Brigati and keyboardist Felix Cavaliere (also members of the Starliters). Gene fronted his own group (The Unbeetables) during this period and they had a sound that was tied to the influence of early 1960s pop/rock. The group's name was a play on The Beatles', and the band got some attention in 1964 with their release of the single "I Wanna Be a Beatle".

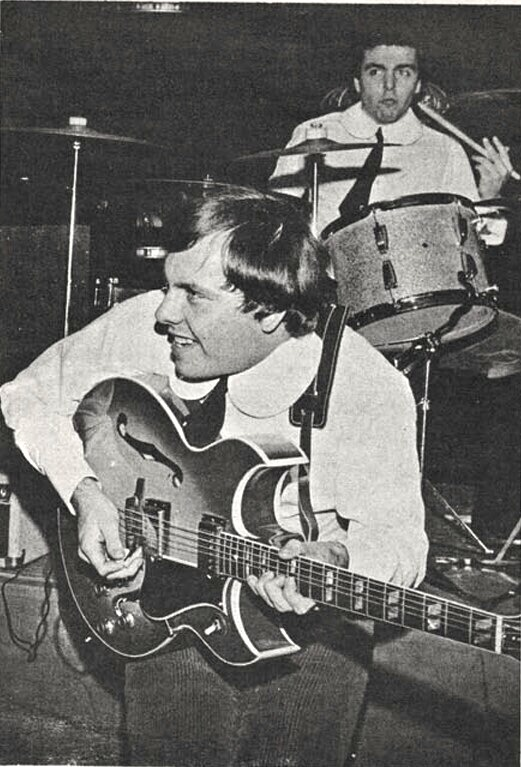
Cornish and Dino Danelli, 1966

By late 1964, Brigati, Cavaliere, and Cornish had teamed with drummer Dino Danelli to form a group that became known as The Young Rascals. They officially began performing in February 1965 and before the year was out, released their first chart single. They rapidly became one of rock-n-roll's top groups. Brigati left the band in 1970 and Cornish followed in 1971. He went on to form the band Bulldog and when that group disbanded, he joined with Rascals' drummer Danelli to form the group Fotomaker. After the group disbanded, Cornish joined the group G.C. Dangerous. Cornish also delved into production when he (along with Danelli) produced the group April Wine's first live album in 1974, and "Stand Back" album in 1975.

In 1988, he reunited with Danelli and Cavaliere on a reunion tour of The Rascals (Brigati did not participate). The tour was cancelled after a short, four-month run. Cornish then joined Danelli to form 'The New Rascals' featuring Gene Cornish and Dino Danelli and in 2005 with Bill Pascali of the Vanilla Fudge and Charlie Souza formerly with Tom Petty's Mudcrutch.

In 1997, the members of the Rascals were inducted into the Rock-n-Roll Hall of Fame. Later that year, Cornish released an album entitled "Live at Palisades Amusement Park". It presented his pre-Rascals recordings, including "I Wanna Be a Beatle," "Rockin' Robin," "Peanuts," "What'd I Say," "You're Gonna Cry Someday," and even Cole Porter's "I Love Paris." Cornish (along with Danelli) continue to tour with "The New Rascals."

On April 24, 2010, all four members of The Rascals reunited for the Kristen Ann Carr benefit, which was held at New York's Tribeca Grill. They played a set that ran over one hour and featured several of their top hits from the 1960s.

He reunited with his band-mates when The Rascals appeared at the Capital Theater in Port Chester, New York, for six shows in December 2012 and for fifteen dates at the Richard Rogers Theatre on Broadway (April 15 – May 5, 2013). Their production, entitled 'Once Upon A Dream', toured North America (Toronto, Los Angeles, Phoenix, Chicago, Detroit, Rochester, and New York City). It was produced by long-time Rascals' fans, Steven Van Zandt and his wife Maureen.

Currently Cornish is touring in a group called Felix Cavaliere & Gene Cornish's Rascals, which also features drummer Carmine Appice.

On September 7, 2018, Cornish collapsed onstage at the Alberta Bair Theater in Billings, Montana, as the band began performing their first song of the evening.

Cornish has been a resident of North Bergen, New Jersey.
