= Divinyls discography =

- Studio albums: 5
- Soundtrack albums: 1
- Compilation albums: 6
- Singles: 26
- B-sides: 2
- Video albums: 1
- Music videos: 4

The discography of Australian rock group Divinyls consists of five studio albums, 26 singles, 6 compilation albums and one video release.

== Albums ==
=== Studio albums ===
Title	Album details	Peak chart positions					Certifications (sales threshold)
Title	Album details	AUS	NZ	SWE	UK	US	Certifications (sales threshold)
Desperate	Release date: January 1983; Label: Chrysalis; Formats: LP, cassette	5	—	—	—	—	ARIA: Platinum
What a Life!	Release date: 28 October 1985; Label: Chrysalis; Formats: LP, cassette	4	42	—	—	91	
Temperamental	Release date: May 1988; Label: Chrysalis; Formats: LP, cassette	11	—	—	—	—	ARIA: Gold
Divinyls	Release date: 29 January 1991; Label: Virgin; Formats: CD, cassette	5	—	25	59	15	ARIA: Gold; RIAA: Gold
Underworld	Release date: August 1996; Label: BMG; Formats: CD, cassette	47	—	—	—	—	
"—" denotes releases that did not chart

=== Soundtrack albums ===
Title	Album details	Peak chart positions
Title	Album details	AUS
Music from Monkey Grip	Release date: May 1982; Label: WEA; Formats: Mini-LP, cassette	25

=== Live albums ===
Title	Album details	Peak chart positions
Title	Album details	AUS
Divinyls Live	Release date: March 1994; Label: Divinyls; Format: CD; Note: Limited edition	155

=== Compilation albums ===
Title	Album details	Peak positions	Certifications (sales threshold)
Title	Album details	AUS	Certifications (sales threshold)
Essential	Release date: 4 November 1991; Label: Chrysalis (321846-2); Formats: CD, cassette	17	ARIA: Platinum
The Collection	Release date: 6 December 1993; Label: Virgin (8280782); Formats: CD, cassette	171	
Make You Happy 1981-1993	Release date: 1997; Label: Raven (RVCD-67); Formats: CD, cassette	190	
Greatest Hits	Release date: 14 August 2006; Label: EMI (09463704822 1); Formats: CD, music download	50	
The Essential	Release date: 2008; Label: EMI (2430712); Formats: CD, music download	14	

== Singles ==
Year	Single	Peak chart positions						Certifications (sales threshold)	Album
Year	Single	AUS	IRE	NZ	UK	US	US Alt	Certifications (sales threshold)	Album
1981	"Boys in Town"	8	—	—	—	—	—		Music from Monkey Grip
1982	"Science Fiction"	13	—	—	—	—	—		Desperate
1983	"Siren (Never Let You Go)"	45	—	—	—	—	—		Desperate
1983	"Casual Encounter"	91	—	—	—	—	—		Desperate
1984	"Good Die Young"	32	—	—	—	—	—		What a Life!
1984	"In My Life"	47	—	—	—	—	—		What a Life!
1985	"Pleasure and Pain"	11	—	8	—	76	—		What a Life!
1985	"Sleeping Beauty"	50	—	—	—	—	—		What a Life!
1986	"Heart Telegraph"	90	—	—	—	—	—		What a Life!
1988	"Back to the Wall"	33	—	—	—	—	—		Temperamental
1988	"Hey Little Boy"	23	—	—	—	—	—		Temperamental
1988	"Punxsie"	—	—	—	—	—	—		Temperamental
1990	"I Touch Myself"	1	8	17	10	4	2	ARIA: Platinum; BPI: Silver; RMNZ: Platinum	Divinyls
1991	"Love School"	43	—	—	—	—	—		Divinyls
1991	"Make Out Alright"	105	—	—	81	—	19		Divinyls
1991	"I'm on Your Side"	92	—	—	—	—	—		Divinyls
1992	"I Ain't Gonna Eat Out My Heart Anymore"	19	—	—	—	—	—		Buffy the Vampire Slayer
1993	"Wild Thing"	39	—	—	—	—	—		Reckless Kelly
1993	"Love Is the Drug"	126	—	—	—	—	—		The Collection
1995	"I'm Jealous"	14	—	—	—	—	—	ARIA: Gold	Underworld
1995	"Heart of Steel"	130	—	—	—	—	—		Underworld
1996	"Hard On Me"	94	—	—	—	—	—		Underworld
1996	"Human on the Inside"	59	—	—	—	—	—		Underworld
1997	"For a Good Time"	163	—	—	—	—	—		Underworld
2007	"Don't Wanna Do This"	148	—	—	—	—	—		N/A
"—" denotes releases that did not chart

== Videography ==
=== Music videos ===
Year	Video	Director
1981	"Boys in Town"	
1981	"Science Fiction"	
1983	"Siren (Never Let You Go)"	
1983	"Casual Encounter"	
1983	"Only Lonely"	
1984	"Good Die Young"	
1984	"In My Life"	
1985	"Pleasure and Pain"	
1986	"Sleeping Beauty"	
1988	"Back to the Wall"	
1988	"Hey Little Boy"	
1988	"Punxsie"	
1990	"I Touch Myself"	Michael Bay
1991	"Love School"	Marcus Nispel
1991	"Make Out Alright"	Paul Boyd
1991	"I'm On Your Side"	Paul Boyd
1992	"I Ain't Gonna Eat Out My Heart Anymore"	
1993	"Wild Thing"	
1995	"I'm Jealous"	
1996	"Human on the Inside"	
1996	"Hard On Me"	
2007	"Don't Wanna Do This"	Viskatoons Animation

=== Video albums ===
- Jailhouse Rock (1993) – Filmed live at Boggo Road Gaol
