= Greatest Hits (Divinyls album) =

Greatest hits album by Divinyls
- Released: 12 August 2006
- Recorded: 1981–1995
- Genre: Rock
- Length: 77:48
- Label: EMI
- Producer: Christine Amphlett; Mark McEntee

Divinyls chronology
Make You Happy (1997)	Greatest Hits (2006)	The Essential (2008)

Professional ratings
Review scores
Source	Rating
AllMusic	4.5/5 stars

Greatest Hits is the 2006 collection of the Divinyls music since their career lifted off in the early 1980s. This album was inspired by the Divinyls' entry into the 2006 ARIA Hall of Fame. This album also marks their 25 years in music. It features some of their biggest hits including "Boys in Town", "Pleasure and Pain" and their number-one hit "I Touch Myself".

It is their only compilation album to feature tracks from all five of the group’s studio albums.

== Track listing ==
1. "Boys in Town" – 2:50
2. "Science Fiction" – 3:32
3. "Siren (Never Let You Go)" – 2:28
4. "Only Lonely" – 3:15
5. "Casual Encounter" – 3:05
6. "Good Die Young" – 3:36
7. "In My Life" – 3:43
8. "Pleasure and Pain" – 3:55
9. "Sleeping Beauty" – 3:38
10. "Temperamental" – 4:30
11. "Back to the Wall" – 4:38
12. "Hey Little Boy" – 3:21
13. "Punxsie" – 4:16
14. "I Touch Myself" – 3:46
15. "Love School" – 5:23
16. "Make Out Alright" – 4:38
17. "I'm on Your Side" – 4:16
18. "I Ain't Gonna Eat Out My Heart Anymore" – 4:30
19. "I'm Jealous" – 4:16
20. "Human on the Inside" – 4:12

== Charts ==
Chart performance for Greatest Hits
Chart (2014)	Peak position
Australian Albums (ARIA)	50
