= Make You Happy (album) =

Compilation album by Divinyls
- Released: 21 October 1997
- Recorded: 1981–1993
- Genre: Rock
- Length: 77:21
- Label: Raven

Divinyls chronology
Underworld (1996)	Make You Happy (1997)	Greatest Hits (2006)

Make You Happy (also known as Make You Happy 1981-1993 (Hits, Rarities & Essential Moments of an Incendiary Australian Band)) is a compilation album by Australian rock band Divinyls, which was released on 21 October 1997. It consists of material spanning from 1981 to 1993 including the hits "Boys in Town", "Science Fiction", "Pleasure and Pain" and their number-one signature song "I Touch Myself". The album's name comes from "I'll Make You Happy", the B-side of "Science Fiction" and a cover version of the 1960s track by The Easybeats. Track 20, "Love in Motion", is a 1992 rerecording of Icehouse's 1981 single with Divinyls' Christina Amphlett featuring on co-lead vocals.

Despite being released in 1997, this compilation did not include recordings from the band's 1996 album Underworld.

== Track listing ==
All tracks are written by Christine Amphlett and Mark McEntee; unless otherwise indicated

No.	Title	Length
1.	"Boys in Town"	2:53
2.	"Girlfriends"	3:14
3.	"Only Lonely"	3:24
4.	"Science Fiction"	3:32
5.	"Siren (Never Let You Go)" (Bjarne Ohlin)	2:32
6.	"I'll Make You Happy" (Stevie Wright, George Young)	3:20
7.	"9:50" (Terence Ernest Britten)	3:14
8.	"Pleasure and Pain" (Michael Chapman, Holly Knight)	3:51
9.	"Good Die Young"	3:39
10.	"Sleeping Beauty"	3:41
11.	"Hey Little Boy" (Don Baskin, Bob Gonzales)	3:22
12.	"Back to the Wall" (Amphlett, McEntee, Richard Feldman)	4:38
13.	"Temperamental"	4:30
14.	"I Touch Myself" (Amphlett, Thomas Kelly, McEntee, William Steinberg)	3:47
15.	"Love School"	5:24
16.	"I'm on Your Side" (Steinberg, Kelly)	4:16
17.	"Wild Thing" (Chip Taylor)	4:11
18.	"I Ain't Gonna Eat Out My Heart Anymore" (Pam Sawyer, Laurie Burton)	4:32
19.	"Love Is the Drug" (Bryan Ferry, Andy MacKay)	4:35
20.	"Love in Motion" (Iva Davies)	4:47

== Charts ==
Chart (1997)	Peak position
Australian Album Chart	190
