= The Essential (Divinyls album) =

Compilation album by Divinyls
- Released: 2008
- Recorded: 1981–1993
- Genre: Rock
- Label: EMI

Divinyls chronology
Greatest Hits (2006)	The Essential (2008)

The Essential is a compilation album by Australian group, Divinyls. It was released in 2008.

== Track listing ==
1. "Boys in Town" - 2:54
2. "Science Fiction" - 3:32
3. "Only Lonely" - 3:15
4. "Good Die Young" - 3:40
5. "Pleasure and Pain" - 3:52
6. "Sleeping Beauty" - 3:41
7. "Temperamental" - 4:31
8. "Hey Little Boy" - :23
9. "Punxsie" - 4:16
10. "I Touch Myself" - 3:48
11. "I Ain't Gonna Eat Out My Heart Anymore" - 4:31
12. "Wild Thing" - 4:12

== Charts ==
The album debuted and peaked at number 14 on the ARIA Charts in March 2013, following Chrissy Amphlett's death.

Chart (2013)	Peak position
Australian Albums (ARIA)	14
