= Essential (Divinyls album) =

Compilation album by Divinyls
- Released: November 1991
- Recorded: 1982–1988
- Genre: Rock
- Length: 46:31
- Label: Chrysalis
- Producers: Christine Amphlett; Mark McEntee

Divinyls chronology
Divinyls (1991)	Essential (1991)	The Collection (1993)

Professional ratings
Review scores
Source	Rating
Allmusic	4.5/5 stars

Essential is a 1991 collection of hits by Australian rock band Divinyls. The album was released by Divinyls previous record label, and includes tracks from their first three studio albums.

== Track listing ==
1. "Pleasure and Pain" (3:51)
2. "Temperamental" (4:31)
3. "Back to the Wall" (4:41)
4. "Only Lonely" (3:14)
5. "Punxsie" (4:16)
6. "Don't You Go Walking" (6:04)
7. "Boys in Town" (2:52)
8. "Hey Little Boy" (3:23)
9. "Science Fiction" (3:33)
10. "Sleeping Beauty" (3:41)
11. "Casual Encounter" (3:06)
12. "I'll Make You Happy" (3:18)

== Charts ==
Chart (1991)	Peak position
Australian Album Chart	17

== Certifications ==
Region	Certification	Certified units/sales
Australia (ARIA)	Platinum	70,000^{^}
^{^} Shipments figures based on certification alone.
