= The Collection (Divinyls album) =

Greatest hits album by Divinyls
- Released: 6 December 1993
- Recorded: 1990–1993
- Genre: Rock
- Length: 66:40
- Label: Virgin

Divinyls chronology
Essential (1991)	The Collection (1993)	Underworld (1996)

Singles from The Collection
- 1. "I Ain't Gonna Eat Out My Heart Anymore" Released: 5 October 1992; 2. "Wild Thing" Released: 15 March 1993; 3. "Love Is the Drug" Released: 29 November 1993

Professional ratings
Review scores
Source	Rating
AllMusic	4/5 stars

The Collection is the second compilation album by Australian band Divinyls, released on 6 December 1993. The album does not include any of their 1980s singles, which were released on a different record label. The album failed to enter the Australian ARIA top 100.

In late 1992, the Divinyls covered The Young Rascals song, "I Ain't Gonna Eat Out My Heart Anymore", for the soundtrack to the film Buffy the Vampire Slayer. It was subsequently issued as the lead single from The Collection, in October 1992. The single peaked at No. 19 on the Australian singles charts and spent sixteen weeks in the top fifty. The second single released, "Wild Thing", was recorded for the soundtrack to the Australian comedy film Reckless Kelly (1993). The song reached No. 39 on the Australian singles charts. The third single, a cover of Roxy Music's "Love Is the Drug", was recorded for the soundtrack to Super Mario Bros.. The single failed to enter the top 100.

== Track listing ==
The Collection
No.	Title	Writer(s)	Length
1.	"I Ain't Gonna Eat Out My Heart Anymore" (from the soundtrack to Buffy the Vampire Slayer)	P. Sawyer, L. Burton	4:33
2.	"Lay Your Body Down" (new version)	M. McEntee, C. Amphlett	4:43
3.	"Make Out Alright" (from the album Divinyls)	C. Amphlett, M. McEntee, M. Watson	4:37
4.	"To Sir With Love" (Gehman Mix)	M. London, B. Black	3:20
5.	"If Love Was a Gun" (from the album Divinyls)	M. McEntee, C. Amphlett	5:38
6.	"I Touch Myself" (from the album Divinyls)	B. Steinberg, T. Kelly, C. Amphlett, M. McEntee	3:47
7.	"Need a Lover" (Jacobs Mix)	M. McEntee, C. Amphlett	4:51
8.	"Wild Thing" (from the soundtrack to Reckless Kelly)	C. Taylor	4:13
9.	"Temperamental" (Recorded Live at Boggo Road Jail on 31 July 1993)	M. McEntee, C Amphlett	4:43
10.	"Love Is the Drug" (from the soundtrack to Super Mario Bros.)	B. Ferry	4:35
11.	"Bless My Soul (It's Rock-n-Roll)" (Recorded Live at Boggo Road Jail on 31 July 1993)	M. McEntee, C Amphlett	7:17
12.	"I'm On Your Side" (from the album Divinyls)	B. Steinburg, T. Kelly	4:18
13.	"Pleasure and Pain" (1993 version)	H. Knight, M. Chapman	4:38
14.	"Love School" (from the album Divinyls)	M. McEntee, C. Amphlett	5:27

== Charts ==
Chart (1993/94)	Peak position
Australian Album Chart	171
