= For a Good Time =

Single by Divinyls

from the album Underworld
- B-side: "Save Me"
- Released: 1997
- Recorded: 1995
- Genre: Rock
- Length: 5:06
- Label: BMG Records
- Songwriter(s): Mark McEntee, Billy Steinberg, Tom Kelly
- Producer(s): Charley Drayton

Divinyls singles chronology
"Human on the Inside" (1996)	"For a Good Time" (1997)	"Don't Wanna Do This" (2007)

"For a Good Time" is a song by Australian rock duo Divinyls, released in early 1997 as the final single from their fifth studio album Underworld.

"For a Good Time" was produced by Divinyls drummer Charley Drayton, who had produced much of the Underworld album. The song was written by Mark McEntee as well as the songwriting duo Billy Steinberg and Tom Kelly, who had both co-written past Divinyls hits such as "I'm Jealous", "I'm On Your Side" and most notably the band's signature hit "I Touch Myself". "For a Good Time" peaked at #163 on the Australian ARIA singles chart.

"For a Good Time" also proved to be Divinyls last song prior to their unofficial disbandment. They would not return for another ten years when they released the compilation album Greatest Hits in 2006 and the comeback single "Don't Wanna Do This" in 2007.

== Track listing ==
Australian CD Single

1. "For a Good Time" - 5:06
2. "For a Good Time" (Blackmarket Mix)
3. "Save Me" - 5:36

== Charts ==
Chart (1997)	Peak position
Australian (ARIA)	163
