= Monkey Grip =

Monkey Grip may refer to:

- Monkey Grip (Bill Wyman album), 1974
- Monkey Grip (novel), 1977 novel by Helen Garner
- Monkey Grip (film), 1982 Australian film, based on the novel
  - Monkey Grip (soundtrack), a soundtrack by the Divinyls to the above film
