= Hard On Me =

Single by Divinyls

from the album Underworld
- Released: April 1996
- Recorded: 1994–1995
- Genre: Rock
- Length: 4:08
- Label: Ariola Records
- Songwriters: Christine Amphlett, Mark McEntee
- Producer: Charley Drayton

Divinyls singles chronology
"Heart of Steel" (1995)	"Hard On Me" (1996)	"Human On the Inside" (1996)

"Hard On Me" is a song by Australian rock duo Divinyls. It was released in April 1996 as the third single from their fifth studio album Underworld. The single was not as commercially successful as earlier singles, peaking at number ninety-four on the Australian singles chart.

== Track listing ==
Australian CD Single

1. "Hard On Me" (Edit)
2. "Hard On Me" (Danger Mix)
3. "Hard On Me" (Instrumental)

== Charts ==
Chart (1996)	Peak position
Australian (ARIA)	94
