= Human on the Inside =

1996 single by Divinyls

Single by Divinyls

from the album Underworld
- B-side: "I Ain't Gonna Eat Out My Heart Anymore"
- Released: August 1996
- Length: 4:12
- Label: RCA; BMG
- Songwriters: Mark McEntee; Shelly Peiken
- Producer: Charley Drayton

Divinyls singles chronology
"Hard on Me" (1996)	"Human on the Inside" (1996)	"For a Good Time" (1997)

"Human on the Inside" is a song by Australian rock duo Divinyls, released in August 1996 as the fourth single from their fifth studio album, Underworld. A minor hit in Australia in 1996, the song became better known after it was covered by British rock band the Pretenders in 1999 under the title "Human". In this version, the song became a 1999 chart hit in several countries.

== Background ==
"Human on the Inside" was one of many tracks from the album Underworld to be produced by Divinyls drummer Charley Drayton. "Human on the Inside" peaked at number 59 on the Australian ARIA singles chart. Likewise, the album Underworld proved to be unsuccessful and only just made the top fifty of the Albums Chart.

== Track listing ==
Australian CD single

1. "Human on the Inside" – 4:12
2. "I Ain't Gonna Eat Out My Heart Anymore" – 4:30
3. "Human on the Inside" (Lonely mix) – 4:08

== Charts ==
Chart (1996)	Peak position
Australia (ARIA)	59

== The Pretenders version ==
"Human"

Single by the Pretenders

from the album ¡Viva El Amor!
- B-side: "The Homecoming" (Street version)
- Released: 3 May 1999
- Studio: Various (London, England); Bearsville (Bearsville, New York)
- Length: 3:55
- Label: WEA
- Songwriters: Mark McEntee; Shelly Peiken
- Producer: Stephen Hague

The Pretenders singles chronology
"Loving You Is All I Know" (1999)	"Human" (1999)	"Popstar" (1999)

This song was covered by the Pretenders as "Human" for their seventh studio album, ¡Viva El Amor! (1999). Issued as a single, the track peaked at number 33 in the United Kingdom and number 17 in New Zealand. In the United States, it peaked at number 30 on the Billboard Adult Top 40.

=== Charts ===
Chart (1999)	Peak position
Europe (Eurochart Hot 100)	96
Germany (GfK)	90
New Zealand (Recorded Music NZ)	17
Scottish Singles Sales (Official Charts)	30
UK Singles (Official Charts)	33
US Adult Top 40 (Billboard)	30

=== Release history ===
Region	Date	Format(s)	Label(s)	Ref.
United Kingdom	3 May 1999	CD; cassette	WEA	
United States	26 July 1999	Adult contemporary; hot adult contemporary radio	Warner Bros.	
United States	10 August 1999	Contemporary hit radio	Warner Bros.	
