= Heart Telegraph =

Single by Divinyls

from the album What a Life!
- B-side: "Guillotine Day"
- Released: 5 May 1986
- Genre: New wave
- Length: 4:48
- Label: Chrysalis
- Songwriter(s): Christine Amphlett, Mark McEntee
- Producer(s): Gary Langan

Divinyls singles chronology
"Sleeping Beauty" (1985)	"Heart Telegraph" (1986)	"Back to the Wall" (1988)

"Heart Telegraph" is a song by Australian rock band Divinyls. It was released in 1986 as the fifth and final single from their second studio album What a Life!. The song was written by Christina Amphlett and Mark McEntee and produced by Gary Langan, who was one of three producers who worked on the album What a Life!.

== Track listing ==
Australian 7" Single

1. "Heart Telegraph" (Edit)
2. "Guillotine Day" - 3:08

Australian 12" Limited Edition

1. "Heart Telegraph" - 4:48
2. "Guillotine Day" - 3:08

== Charts ==
Chart (1986)	Peak position
Australia (Kent Music Report)	90
