= Hard On Me (disambiguation) =

Hard On Me is a song by Divinyls from Underworld.

Hard On Me may also refer to:

- Hard on Me, a song by Asia from Astra
- Hard on Me, a song by Tom Petty from Wildflowers
