= Make You Happy =

"Make You Happy" may refer to:

- "Make You Happy" (song), a 1996 song by Celine Dion
- Make You Happy (album), a 1997 album by Divinyls
- Make You Happy (EP), a 2020 EP, or the title song by NiziU
- "Make You Happy", 2012 song by Mika from the album The Origin of Love
