= In My Life (Divinyls song) =

Single by Divinyls

from the album What a Life!
- B-side: "Don't You Go Walking"
- Released: 26 November 1984
- Genre: Pub rock, new wave
- Length: 3:43
- Label: Chrysalis Records
- Songwriter(s): Christine Amphlett, Mark McEntee
- Producer(s): Gary Langan

Divinyls singles chronology
"Good Die Young" (1984)	"In My Life" (1984)	"Pleasure and Pain" (1985)

"In My Life" is rock song by Australian band Divinyls. It was released in November 1984 as the second single from their second studio album What a Life! and charted within the top fifty on the Australian singles chart, peaking at number forty-seven.

== Song information ==
"In My Life" was written by Christina Amphlett and Mark McEntee and was produced by Gary Langan, who had been brought in to work on the album What a Life! at Amphlett and McEntee's persuasion. Langan created an edgier rock sound for Divinyls with several tracks, in particular "In My Life".

"In My Life" proved not to be a major success in Australia, where it peaked at number forty-seven on the Kent Music Report top fifty singles chart. Nevertheless, Divinyls next single "Pleasure and Pain" became a big hit.

== Track listing ==
Australian 7" Single

1. "In My Life" - 3:43
2. "Don't You Go Walking" (Remix) - 5:15

== Charts ==
Chart (1984)	Peak position
Australia (Kent Music Report)	47
