= Don't Wanna Do This =

Single by Divinyls
- B-side: "Asphyxiated"
- Released: 24 November 2007
- Genre: Rock
- Length: 2:51
- Label: Universal Records
- Songwriter(s): Christine Amphlett, Cameron McGlinchey
- Producer(s): Andrew McManus

Divinyls singles chronology
"For a Good Time" (1997)	"Don't Wanna Do This" (2007)

"Don't Wanna Do This" is a song by Australian rock duo Divinyls. It was released in 2007 as their comeback single after an eleven-year-long hiatus, during which they unofficially disbanded.

== Background ==
In 2006, Divinyls were inducted into the Australian ARIA Hall of Fame. To coincide with their induction, a compilation album Greatest Hits was released and within a year Divinyls had signed a new record deal with Universal Records. They recruited former manager Andrew McManus, who had most notably worked with the band in the early 1990s, during which Divinyls scored their biggest hit and signature song "I Touch Myself".

Christina Amphlett and Mark McEntee, who were the foundation of the band, had been estranged from one another since they disbanded a decade earlier by the end of 1996. Nevertheless, they reunited and began the plans for a return. "Don't Wanna Do This" was written by Amphlett and former Rogue Traders drummer Cameron McGlinchey. Of McGlinchey and writing the song Amphlett said "He was playing in this rock band and he'd leave me notes, he wanted me to write with him for about a year. I thought he was just this rock guy, then I found out he was in Rogue Traders."

The B-side single "Asphyxiated" was written by Mark McEntee and conveyed a darker sound than what Divinyls had been known for. "It's all the things you love about Mark's playing", Amphlett said of the song. "It shouldn't be overlooked. It's dark but it's that other side of Divinyls. It's why Mark and I are together, it's that thing we have. A lot of the new songs are about killing and death. We can write about negative shit now. We used to get told "You can't do that", now it's all death and darkness."

== Track listing ==
Australian CD single

1. "Don't Wanna Do This" - 2:51
2. "Asphyxiated" - 3:42

Digital Download single

1. "Don't Wanna Do This"
2. "Asphyxiated"

== Charts ==
Chart (2007)	Peak position
Australia (ARIA)	148
