= Underworld (Divinyls album) =

Studio album by Divinyls
- Released: November 11, 1996
- Recorded: 1994–1995
- Genres: Rock, soft rock, pop rock
- Length: 54:28
- Label: BMG Records
- Producers: Christine Amphlett, Mark McEntee, Peter Collins, Keith Forsey, Charley Drayton

Divinyls chronology
The Collection (1993)	Underworld (1996)	Make You Happy (1997)

Singles from Underworld
- 1. "I'm Jealous" Released: 13 February 1995; 2. "Heart of Steel" Released: 1995; 3. "Hard On Me" Released: April 1996; 4. "Human on the Inside" Released: August 1996; 5. "For a Good Time" Released: 1997

Professional ratings
Review scores
Source	Rating
Allmusic	3/5 stars

Underworld is the fifth and final studio album by Australian band Divinyls, released on November 11, 1996, by BMG Records. It was the band's first studio album release in five years and their final release with original lead singer Chrissy Amphlett. The lead single "I'm Jealous" had been successful when released in 1995, however this did not have an effect on the album as Underworld was supposed to be released in the 3rd quarter of 1995, but the album was delayed repeatedly due to production problems. Underworld debuted and peaked at number forty-seven on the ARIA Albums Chart and was their last charting album.

== Reception ==
Bernard Zuel said the album was "more or less what you expect from the Divinyls. McEntee is still working the Keith Richards-inspired chords and Amphlett pouts, prods and sometimes bites."

== Track listing ==
No.	Title	Writer(s)	Length
1.	"Hard On Me"	Christine Amphlett, Mark McEntee	4:34
2.	"Sex Will Keep Us Together"	Amphlett, Ellen Shipley, Rick Nowels	3:56
3.	"I'm Jealous"	Amphlett, Billy Steinberg, Tom Kelly	4:15
4.	"For a Good Time"	McEntee, Steinberg, Kelly	5:06
5.	"Open Windows"	Amphlett, McEntee	4:51
6.	"Bleed"		0:53
7.	"Underworld"	Amphlett, McEntee	3:52
8.	"Human on the Inside"	McEntee, Shelly Peiken	4:12
9.	"Come Down To Earth"	Amphlett, McEntee	4:38
10.	"Spook"		0:41
11.	"Sorry"	Amphlett, McEntee	4:51
12.	"Heart of Steel"	Amphlett, McEntee, Guy Gray	4:45
13.	"Save Me"	Amphlett, McEntee	5:36
14.	"Black Magic"	Amphlett, McEntee	5:38

== Personnel ==
- Christine Amphlett – lead vocals; backing vocals (tracks 1, 2, 5, 7, 11–13)
- Mark McEntee – guitars, backing vocals
- Charley Drayton – drums (tracks 1–5, 7, 8, 11–14), percussion (tracks 1–3, 5, 7, 11, 12), backing vocals (tracks 1, 2, 5, 7, 8, 11, 13), guitar (1, 4, 7, 8, 11, 13), bass (1, 7, 8)
- Keith Forsey – programming (tracks 2, 12)
- Arthur Barrow – bass (track 2)
- Jerome Smith – bass (tracks 3–5, 7, 8, 11–14)
- Jim Hoke – recorder (track 3)
- Charlie Owen – guitar (track 5, 7, 11, 13)
- Marty Irwin – strings (track 9)

== Charts ==
Chart (1996)	Peak position
Australian Albums (ARIA)	47
