= Bill Greensmith =

English cricketer (1930–2022)

Personal information
- Full name: William Thomas Greensmith
- Born: 16 August 1930; Middlesbrough, Yorkshire, England
- Died: 15 July 2022 (aged 91); Melbourne, Victoria, Australia
- Batting: Right-handed
- Bowling: Right-arm leg-break and googly
- Role: All-rounder

Domestic team information
- Years: Team
- 1947–1963: Essex

Career statistics
Competition	First-class
Matches	379
Runs scored	8,249
Batting average	19.92
100s/50s	1/27
Top score	138*
Balls bowled	44,941
Wickets	733
Bowling average	28.59
5 wickets in innings	21
10 wickets in match	2
Best bowling	8/59
Catches/stumpings	149/–
- Source: CricketArchive, 6 November 2024

William Thomas Greensmith (16 August 1930 – 15 July 2022) was a former English cricketer who played in 379 first-class matches, most of them for Essex, between 1947 and 1963. He was born in Middlesbrough, then in Yorkshire.

An all-rounder, the right-handed Greensmith usually batted in the lower middle order, and was a right-arm leg-spin and googly bowler. Without ever hitting the heights – he never scored 1000 runs in a season and nor did he ever take 100 wickets – he was an integral part of the Essex team from the start of the 1951 season through to 1963, when he was replaced in some games by Robin Hobbs and retired at the end of the season. After he retired from cricket he emigrated to Australia, where he lived until his death in 2022. At the time of his death he was Essex's oldest capped player. His daughter is fashion designer Melanie Greensmith.
