= Good Die Young =

Single by Divinyls

from the album What a Life!
- B-side: "9:50"
- Released: 16 July 1984
- Genre: Rock, new wave
- Length: 3:36
- Label: Chrysalis Records
- Songwriters: Christine Amphlett, Mark McEntee
- Producer: Gary Langan

Divinyls singles chronology
| "Casual Encounter" (1983) | "Good Die Young" (1984) | "In My Life" (1984) |

B-side cover
- B-side single

"Good Die Young" is a song by Australian rock band Divinyls, released in July 1984 as the lead single the band's second studio album What a Life! and proved to be a moderate success in Australia.

The music video was shot in various Sydney locations - outside Railway Square next to a famous golf retailer's neon lights, outside George Street cinema complex, and on a building next to Sydney's General Post Office clocktower, with Australia Square prominently in the background.

== Background ==
Divinyls began recording material for their second album over a two-year span, with Christina Amphlett and Mark McEntee writing several songs and working with three different producers along the way. Mark Opitz was the first, having already produced the band's debut album Desperate. However Amphlett and McEntee were not satisfied with his efforts and eventually settled on musician/producer Gary Langan to work on the rest of the album. "Good Die Young" was one of the tracks recorded during Langan's run as producer, however a full album did not materialize at that stage and eventually Mike Chapman stepped in to produce the rest of What a Life! as well as the entirety of the band's next album Temperamental.

In Australia, "Good Die Young" was released as the lead single from the album What a Life!, as their previous song "Casual Encounter" appeared on their debut album Desperate. However, the American release of What a Life! also included "Casual Encounter", therefore making "Good Die Young" the second single release in the US.

"Good Die Young" charted within the top forty on the Australian singles chart, peaking at number thirty-two. Although the single narrowly missed the top thirty, it was considered a moderate success after the band's previous single "Casual Encounter" had only peaked at number ninety-one.

The B-side "9.50" is a cover of The Twilights' 1967 song, written by Terry Britten.

== Track listing ==
Australian 7" Single

1. "Good Die Young" - 3:36
2. "9:50" - 3:10

== Charts ==
| Chart (1984) | Peak position |
|---|---|
| Australia (Kent Music Report) | 32 |
