= What a Life! (album) =

Studio album by Divinyls
- Released: 28 October 1985
- Recorded: 1983–1985
- Genres: Rock, new wave, pub rock, pop rock
- Length: 40:00
- Label: Chrysalis
- Producers: Mike Chapman, Gary Langan, Mark Opitz

Divinyls chronology
Desperate (1983)	What a Life! (1985)	Temperamental (1988)

Singles from What a Life!
- 1. "Good Die Young" Released: 16 July 1984; 2. "In My Life" Released: 26 November 1984; 3. "Pleasure and Pain" Released: 2 September 1985; 4. "Sleeping Beauty" Released: 16 December 1985; 5. "Heart Telegraph" Released: 5 May 1986

What a Life! is the second studio album by Australian band Divinyls, released in October 1985 by Chrysalis Records. The album is a genre of rock and new wave songs—written by Divinyls members Christina Amphlett and Mark McEntee.

== History ==
After touring and promoting in the United States, Divinyls came back to Australia to begin the follow-up to Desperate, with Mark Opitz producing again. They produced three songs including "Don't You Go Walking" and "Motion" but Amphlett and McEntee were not satisfied so they returned to the road, replacing drummer Richard Harvey with J.J. Harris, and wrote more songs. A year later they again tried recording, this time with the producer Gary Langan who was the founding member of the band Art of Noise. He brought a sophisticated, high-tech edge to Divinyls' sound, but a full album failed to get done. Recording stopped once more. Amphlett later said, "It's terrible decision to make because you've just spent all this money and you have to tell the record company, 'sorry, the songs just aren't good enough.' It's so terrible you just want to die."

Eventually, Amphlett and McEntee made a journey to Los Angeles, where they asked pop producer Mike Chapman to come back with them to Australia and finish their second album. Chapman ended up producing only two songs: "Pleasure and Pain" (which he also co-wrote with Holly Knight) and "Sleeping Beauty". The album was released almost two years after recording began. It reached No.4 in Australia and No.91 in the US, while "Pleasure and Pain" hit No.11 in Australia and the lower reaches of the Top 100 in the US. Two later singles, "Sleeping Beauty" and "Heart Telegraph", charted moderately in Australia but did little in the US. Despite its Australian success, Chrysalis declared the album a failure.

== Reception ==
Professional ratings
Review scores
Source	Rating
AllMusic	2/5 stars

Rolling Stone described the music as "loud and hard-edged, as purely physical as any metal band, but tempered with ... swaggering rowdiness". Ram magazine noted the band's writing had a newfound maturity, "verbalising adult fears and lingering adolescent yearnings". AllMusic's later review said many of the album tracks were hardly memorable and that the band's best strengths lay both in Amphlett's unique vocal delivery, and McEntee's bottom-heavy, grungy, guitar work.

== Track listing ==
=== Australian release ===
No.	Title	Writer(s)	Producer(s)	Length
1.	"Pleasure and Pain"	Mike Chapman, Holly Knight	Mike Chapman	3:55
2.	"Sleeping Beauty"	Christine Amphlett, Mark McEntee	Mike Chapman	3:38
3.	"Good Die Young"	Amphlett, McEntee	Gary Langan	3:36
4.	"Guillotine Day"	Bjarne Ohlin	Gary Langan	3:08
5.	"Talk Like the Rain"	Amphlett, McEntee	Charles Fisher	3:07
6.	"Heart Telegraph"	Amphlett, McEntee	Gary Langan	4:48
7.	"Old Radios"	Amphlett, McEntee	Gary Langan	4:06
8.	"In My Life"	Amphlett, McEntee	Gary Langan	3:43
9.	"Para-Dice"	McEntee, Rick Grossman	Gary Langan	3:53
10.	"What a Life!"	Amphlett, McEntee	Mark McEntee, Charles Fisher	4:03
11.	"Dear Diary"	Bjarne Ohlin	Gary Langan	4:25

=== US release ===
No.	Title	Writer(s)	Producer(s)	Length
1.	"Pleasure and Pain"	Mike Chapman, Holly Knight	Mike Chapman	3:55
2.	"Don't You Go Walking"	Mark McEntee	Mark Opitz	5:58
3.	"Good Die Young"	Amphlett, McEntee	Gary Langan	3:36
4.	"Sleeping Beauty"	Christine Amphlett, McEntee	Mike Chapman	3:38
5.	"Motion"	Amphlett, McEntee	Mark Opitz	3:36
6.	"In My Life"	Amphlett, McEntee	Gary Langan	3:43
7.	"Casual Encounter"	Amphlett, McEntee	Mark Opitz	3:05
8.	"Heart Telegraph"	Amphlett, McEntee	Gary Langan	4:48
9.	"Guillotine Day"	Bjarne Ohlin	Gary Langan	3:08
10.	"Dear Diary"	Bjarne Ohlin	Gary Langan	4:25

== Charts ==
Chart (1985)	Peak position
Australian Albums (Kent Music Report)	4
US Billboard 200	91

== Personnel ==
- Christine Amphlett – vocals, writer
- Mark McEntee – vocals, guitar, keyboards, writer
- Richard Harvey – drums
- Bjarne Ohlin – vocals, guitar, keyboards, writer
- Rick Grossman – bass, writer
- Rick Chadwick – keyboards, programming
- Mars Lazaar – keyboards, programming
- Mary Bradfield Taylor – background vocals
- Simon Darlow – keyboards, programming
- Charles Fisher – producer, mixer
- Mike Chapman – producer, writer
- Gary Langan – producer
- Mark Opitz – producer
- Tom Colley – engineer
- John Bee – engineer
- Richard Meuke – engineer

== Sales ==
Region	Certification	Certified units/sales
Australia	—	100,000
