= The Rascals discography =

The Rascals' discography is diverse, with numerous compilations. Their early—and primary—output was all recorded on Atlantic Records and produced with Arif Mardin. After the band left Atlantic in 1971, they recorded two albums for Columbia with various line-ups other than the original four members of the group.

== Albums ==
=== Studio albums ===
List of albums, with selected chart positions
Title	Album details	Peak chart positions				Certifications
Title	Album details	US	US R&B	US C/B	CAN	Certifications
The Young Rascals
The Young Rascals	Released: March 28, 1966; Label: Atlantic (8123 / SD-8123)	15	—	10	—	RIAA: Gold
Collections	Released: December 10, 1966; Label: Atlantic (8134 / SD-8134)	14	5	15	8	RIAA: Gold
Groovin'	Released: July 31, 1967; Label: Atlantic (8148 / SD-8148)	5	7	6	2	RIAA: Gold
The Rascals
Once Upon a Dream	Released: February 9, 1968; Label: Atlantic (8169 / SD-8169)	9	7	8	—	
Freedom Suite	Released: March 17, 1969; Label: Atlantic (SD 2-90) (Note: Mono is promo only. All remaining albums issued in stereo only.)	17	40	16	20	RIAA: Gold
See	Released: December 15, 1969; Label: Atlantic (SD-8246)	45	—	18	11	
Search and Nearness	Released: March 1, 1971; Label: Atlantic (SD-8276)	198	—	—	—	
Peaceful World	Released: May 5, 1971; Label: Columbia (G 30462)	122	—	69	50	
The Island of Real	Released: May 2, 1972; Label: Columbia (KC 31103)	180	—	—	—	
"—" denotes releases that did not chart or was not released in that territory.

=== Selected compilations ===
There are many vinyl, tape and CD compilations and reissues by a multitude of companies in the U.S., Germany, Japan and elsewhere.

List of selected compilation albums, with chart positions
Title	Album details	Peak chart positions			Certifications
Title	Album details	US	US R&B	US C/B	Certifications
Time Peace: The Rascals' Greatest Hits	Released: June 24, 1968; Label: Atlantic (8190 / SD-8190)	1	4	1	RIAA: Gold
Searching for Ecstasy: The Rest of the Rascals 1969–1972	Released: 1988; Label: Rhino	—	—	—	
Anthology: 1965–1972	Released: 1992; Label: Atlantic (8148 / SD-8148)	—	—	—	
The Very Best of The Rascals	Released: July 20, 1993; Label: Rhino/Atlantic (R2 71277)	—	—	—	
All I Really Need: The Complete Atlantic Recordings, 1965–1971	Released: 2001; Label: Rhino Handmade	—	—	—	
"—" denotes releases that did not chart.

== Singles ==
List of singles, with selected chart positions
Title	Year	Peak chart positions						Certifications	Album
Title	Year	US	US R&B	US C/B	AUS	CAN	UK	Certifications	Album
The Young Rascals
"I Ain't Gonna Eat Out My Heart Anymore"	1965	52	—	63	48	23	—		The Young Rascals
"Good Lovin'"	1966	1	—	1	43	1	—	RIAA: Gold	The Young Rascals
"You Better Run"	1966	20	—	23	—	22	—		Groovin'
"Come On Up"	1966	43	—	51	—	57	—		Collections
"I've Been Lonely Too Long"	1967	16	33	17	—	7	—		Collections
"Groovin'"	1967	1	3	1	3	1	8	RIAA: Platinum	Groovin'
"A Girl Like You"	1967	10	—	8	31	1	37		Groovin'
"How Can I Be Sure"	1967	4	—	2	23	1	—		Groovin'
"It's Wonderful"	1967	20	—	15	57	7	—		Once Upon a Dream
The Rascals
"A Beautiful Morning"	1968	3	36	3	36	1	—	RIAA: Platinum	Time Peace: The Rascals Greatest Hits
"People Got to Be Free"	1968	1	14	1	11	1	—	RIAA: Gold	Freedom Suite
"A Ray of Hope"	1968	24	36	14	50	10	—		Freedom Suite
"Heaven"	1969	39	—	17	58	4	—		Freedom Suite
"See"	1969	27	—	13	27	8	—		See
"Carry Me Back"	1969	26	—	12	59	6	—		See
"Hold On"	1969	51	—	29	64	22	—		See
"Glory Glory"	1970	58	—	42	—	40	—		Search and Nearness
"Right On"	1970	—	—	—	—	—	—		Search and Nearness
"Love Me"	1971	95	—	74	—	—	—		Peaceful World
"Lucky Day"	1971	—	—	—	—	—	—		The Island of Real
"Brother Tree"	1972	—	—	—	—	—	—		The Island of Real
"Hummin' Song"	1972	—	—	—	—	—	—		The Island of Real
"Jungle Walk"	1972	—	—	—	—	—	—		The Island of Real
"—" denotes a recording that did not chart or was not released in that territory.
