= Lori Burton =

American singer (1940–2021)

- Also known as: Lori Cicala
- Born: Dolores Diana Squeglia; September 30, 1940; New Haven, Connecticut, U.S.
- Died: May 20, 2021 (aged 80)
- Occupation(s): Singer, songwriter
- Labels: Roulette, Philips, Mercury

Lori Burton (born Dolores Diana Squeglia, September 30, 1940 - May 20, 2021) was an American singer, songwriter, and record producer.

== Biography ==
She was born in New Haven, Connecticut, and studied music at the University of Hartford before marrying recording engineer and later record producer Roy Cicala. In the mid-1960s she adopted the stage name Lori Burton (the surname taken from that of popular actor Richard Burton), and recorded a single, "Yeh, Yeh, Yeh (That Boy Of Mine)" for Roulette Records (a song which was later recorded by Lesley Gore), before teaming up with English-born lyricist Pam Sawyer, the wife of producer Robert Mersey. They found success writing songs recorded by Lulu ("Try to Understand", UK #25, 1965), Patti LaBelle and the Bluebelles ("All or Nothing", US #68, 1965), The Young Rascals ("I Ain't Gonna Eat Out My Heart Anymore", US #52, 1966), and The Royal Guardsmen ("Baby Let's Wait", US #35, 1968 on reissue).

Burton and Sawyer also wrote and recorded together as The Whyte Boots, with Burton as lead singer, releasing the teenage tragedy record "Nightmare", in which two girls fight to the death over a boy, in 1966. Writer Richie Unterberger described the record as "one of the most accurate approximations of the Shangri-Las ever recorded". Their record company, Philips, promoted the act as a trio of female singers, none of whom actually appeared on the recordings. In 1967, Burton co-wrote and co-produced, with Sawyer, her only solo album, Breakout, described by Unterberger as "a mixture of soul and densely produced New York mid-'60s pop/rock". According to the album's original liner notes, Burton's demo recordings were heard by Mercury Records president Irving Green, who encouraged her to release the album under her own name.

Burton and Sawyer then auditioned for Holland, Dozier and Holland who had them signed to Motown as a songwriting partnership, but after a few months Burton decided to end the arrangement while Sawyer continued to work at Motown. Burton focused on her family life for several years before starting to contribute occasional backing vocals at New York's Record Plant East Studios, owned by her husband Roy Cicala. In 1974, she contributed backing vocals to John Lennon's "#9 Dream" from his Walls and Bridges album. She also recorded songs, unissued at the time, on which Cicala and Lennon worked as co-producers; two were released in 1998 in conjunction with the book Beatles Undercover by Kristofer Engelhardt. Lori and Roy Cicala divorced in 1979.

Her 1967 album Breakout was reissued on CD by Rev-Ola in 2005.

She died in May 2021, aged 80.
