= Melanie Greensmith =

Australian fashion designer

- Born: 18 July 1964 (age 62)
- Occupation: Fashion designer

Melanie Greensmith (18 July 1964) is a fashion designer and property investor from Australia. She established the fashion label Wheels & Dollbaby in 1987.

== Early life ==
Melanie Greensmith grew up in London, England. Her mother was a Bluebell showgirl who danced in Paris clubs, and her father, Bill Greensmith, was a first class English cricketer.

== Career ==
Greensmith founded her business in Australia in 1987, without any formal training in fashion, art or design.

She began her career with a $5,000 AUD investment in a small store in the then-trendy Surry Hills area of Sydney. Her brand expanded into global distribution, selling in department stores such as Harvey Nicols, Harrods, and Selfridges in London, alongside various retailers across the United States and Australia.

The clothing line has been worn by high-profile figures, including Michael Jackson, Kate Moss, Debbie Harry, Mick Jagger, Katy Perry, Amy Winehouse, Slash, Bob Dylan, Jerry Hall, Pamela Anderson, Chrissie Hynde, and Britney Spears. The Wheels and Dollbaby brand has been featured in films, music videos, and commercials and, since 2005, has maintained a cardigan collaboration with Dita Von Teese.

== Personal life ==
Melanie resides on her country estate on the outskirts of Perth with her long-term partner Mark McEntee, co founder of Aussie Rock and Roll power house Divinyls. She primarily spends her time between Sydney, London and Los Angeles. An active animal welfare advocate who raises money for Animal Australia and the Dog Refugee Home Perth. Her second passion to fashion is interior decorating and building her property portfolio globally.

== Recognition ==
Honoured in the West Australian Museum for her contribution and innovation to the fashion industry in 2021.

In 2008, Greensmith was honoured for her contributions to the Western Australian fashion industry when she was awarded a star on the Western Australia Fashion Walk of Fame on King Street in Perth.
