= I'm on Your Side (song) =

Single by Divinyls

from the album Divinyls
- B-side: "I Touch Myself" (Live)
- Released: 9 September 1991
- Recorded: 1990
- Studio: Groove Masters, Santa Monica
- Genre: Soft rock
- Length: 4:16
- Label: Virgin Records
- Songwriter(s): Billy Steinberg; Tom Kelly
- Producer(s): Christine Amphlett; Mark McEntee; David Tickle

Divinyls singles chronology
"Make Out Alright" (1991)	"I'm on Your Side" (1991)	"I Ain't Gonna Eat Out My Heart Anymore" (1992)

"I'm on Your Side" is a ballad performed by Australian rock duo Divinyls. It was released 9 September 1991 as the fourth and final single from their self-titled album, Divinyls (1991).

== Background ==
"I'm on Your Side" is one of few Divinyls songs not written by Christina Amphlett and Mark McEntee. Instead it was written by American song writing duo, Billy Steinberg and Tom Kelly, who had both co-written Divinyls' "I Touch Myself" with Amphlett and McEntee.

"I'm on Your Side" peaked at number 92 on the Australian ARIA Singles Chart.

== Track listing ==
Australian 7" single

1. "I'm on Your Side" – 3:41
2. "I Touch Myself" (Live) – 4:03

Australian CD single

1. "I'm on Your Side" – 3:41
2. "I Touch Myself" (Live) – 4:03
3. "Boys in Town" (Live) – 3:04

Australian EP maxi single

1. "I'm on Your Side" – 3:41
2. "I'll Make You Happy" (Live) – 3:45
3. "Boys in Town" (Live) – 3:04
4. "Pleasure and Pain" (Live) – 4:30
5. "I Touch Myself" (Live) – 4:03

US Promo CD single

1. "I'm on Your Side" (Greg Royale Edit) – 3:43

== Charts ==
Chart (1991)	Peak position
Australia (ARIA)	92
