= Casual Encounter =

Single by Divinyls

from the album Desperate
- B-side: "Gonna Get You"
- Released: August 1983
- Genre: Rock, new wave
- Length: 3:05 (single and What a Life! versions); 3:17 (original Desperate version)
- Label: Chrysalis Records
- Songwriter(s): Christine Amphlett, Mark McEntee
- Producer(s): Mark Opitz

Divinyls singles chronology
"Siren (Never Let You Go)" (1983)	"Casual Encounter" (1983)	"Good Die Young" (1984)

"Casual Encounter" is a song by Australian rock band Divinyls, released in August 1983. The song was released as the third and final single on the Australian release of the band's debut album Desperate, but first appeared on the international release of their second album What a Life!. "Casual Encounter" did not meet with success when it was released as a single, only peaking at number ninety-one on the Australian Kent Music Report singles chart.

== Track listing ==
Australian 7" Single

1. "Casual Encounter" - 3:05
2. "Gonna Get You" (Re-recorded)
3. "Only Lonely" (Live)

== Charts ==
Chart (1983)	Peak position
Australia (Kent Music Report)	91
