= Love School =

1991 song by Divinyls

Single by Divinyls

from the album Divinyls
- Released: 11 March 1991
- Studio: Groove Masters (Santa Monica, California)
- Length: 5:23
- Label: Virgin
- Songwriters: Christine Amphlett, Mark McEntee
- Producers: Christine Amphlett, Mark McEntee, David Tickle

Divinyls singles chronology
"I Touch Myself" (1990)	"Love School" (1991)	"Make Out Alright" (1991)

"Love School" is a song by Australian rock duo Divinyls, released in March 1991 from their fourth studio album, Divinyls. "Love School" peaked at number 43 on the Australian ARIA Singles Chart.

== Background ==
In late 1990, Divinyls released the song "I Touch Myself", which went to number one in Australia, number four in the US and number ten in the UK. Although "Love School" did not chart internationally, it still became a minor success in Australia, where it peaked at number 43 and spent four weeks in the top 50.

== Track listing ==
Australian 7-inch and CD single

1. "Love School" (edit) – 4:10
2. "Love School" (instrumental)

== Charts ==
Chart (1991)	Peak position
Australia (ARIA)	43
