= Divinyls (album) =

Studio album by Divinyls
- Released: 29 January 1991
- Recorded: July−October 1990
- Studios: Groove Masters Studio, Santa Monica; "Cafe Interlude" recorded at Mega Studios (Paris)
- Genre: Pop rock
- Length: 47:41
- Label: Virgin
- Producers: Christine Amphlett, Mark McEntee, David Tickle

Divinyls chronology
Temperamental (1988)	Divinyls (1991)	Essential (1991)

Singles from Divinyls
- 1. "I Touch Myself" Released: 19 November 1990; 2. "Love School" Released: 21 April 1991; 3. "Make Out Alright" Released: 1991; 4. "I'm on Your Side" Released: 9 September 1991

Divinyls (stylised as diVINYLS) is the fourth studio album by Australian band Divinyls, released on 29 January 1991 by Virgin Records. The album was the band's most successful, peaking at number 5 in Australia and number 15 on the US Billboard 200. It also contains the band's biggest-selling single, "I Touch Myself", which reached number one in Australia, number four in the US and number 10 in the UK.

== Background and recording ==
It was the only album recorded by the band with the Virgin Records label after a recording contract with Chrysalis Records in the UK was terminated. Virgin told manager Andrew McManus they were keen to sign the band—by then comprising just singer Chrissy Amphlett and guitarist Mark McEntee—because they saw Amphlett as "the next Madonna". Amphlett and McEntee moved to an apartment in Paris where they wrote "Love School", "Make Out Alright" and "Lay Your Body Down", before transferring to Los Angeles, where the remainder of the album was written, partly in collaboration with songwriters Billy Steinberg and Tom Kelly.

The album was recorded at Jackson Browne's Groove Masters Studio in Santa Monica, with backing provided by bassist Randy Jackson, keyboardist Benmont Tench of Tom Petty and the Heartbreakers and drummer Charley Drayton, who later married Amphlett in 1999.

== Promotion ==
Director Michael Bay filmed a video for "I Touch Myself" in a nunnery in Pasadena. The clip was nominated for an MTV award but in their home country was banned from television.

== Critical reception ==
Professional ratings
Review scores
Source	Rating
AllMusic	3.5/5 stars
Chicago Tribune	2/4 stars
Robert Christgau	(choice cut)
Entertainment Weekly	B−
People Magazine	(favorable)
Rolling Stone	4/5 stars

Jim Farber from Rolling Stone gave praise to the album's instrumentation and lyrical hooks for giving the band more grit and attention to listeners than the "murky production" found on Temperamental. He also highlighted Chrissy Amphlett's vocal performance as another step up from the previous album, calling it "the most sexually charged voice from a rock female" since Chrissie Hynde. Alex Henderson of AllMusic found the record to be "respectable and generally appealing", praising its new wave-influenced tracks for having a sense of edge and melody to them. He added that the band's debut effort Desperate was a better starting point for new listeners but said that this contained more strengths to warrant more attention.

== Track listing ==
No.	Title	Writer(s)	Length
1.	"Make Out Alright"	Christine Amphlett, Mark McEntee, Martyn Watson	4:38
2.	"I Touch Myself"	Amphlett, McEntee, Tom Kelly, Billy Steinberg	3:46
3.	"Lay Your Body Down"	Amphlett, McEntee	4:51
4.	"Love School"	Amphlett, McEntee	5:23
5.	"Bless My Soul (It's Rock-n-Roll)"	Amphlett, McEntee	4:00
6.	"If Love Was a Gun"	Amphlett, McEntee	5:36
7.	"Need a Lover"	Amphlett, McEntee	4:50
8.	"Follow Through"	Amphlett, McEntee	4:44
9.	"Café Interlude"		0:41
10.	"Bullet"	Amphlett, David Malloy, McEntee	4:56
11.	"I'm on Your Side"	Kelly, Steinberg	4:16

== Personnel ==
Musicians

- Chrissy Amphlett – lead vocals and backing vocals
- Mark McEntee – guitars and backing vocals
- Benmont Tench – piano and organ
- Randy Jackson – bass
- Charley Drayton – drums and harmonica
- Brian MacLeod – percussion
- Scott Crago – drums
- Van Dyke Parks – string arrangement ("Love School")

Production

- Produced by Chrissy Amphlett, Mark McEntee and David Tickle
- Recorded by David Tickle and Robert Salcedo, except "Cafe Interlude" (recorded by Jean LeRoc)
- Mixed by Rob Jacobs, Robert Salcedo and Brian Scheuble
- Mastered by Doug Sax

== Charts ==
=== Weekly charts ===
Weekly chart performance for Divinyls
Chart (1991)	Peak position
Australian Albums (ARIA)	5
Canada Top Albums/CDs (RPM)	33
Swedish Albums (Sverigetopplistan)	25
UK Albums (Official Charts)	59
US Billboard 200	15

=== Year-end charts ===
Year-end chart performance for Divinyls
Chart (1991)	Position
Australian Albums (ARIA)	49
US Billboard 200	98

== Certifications ==
Certifications for Divinyls
Region	Certification	Certified units/sales
Australia (ARIA)	Gold	35,000^{^}
United States (RIAA)	Gold	500,000^{^}
^{^} Shipments figures based on certification alone.

== "Make Out Alright" ==
"Make Out Alright"

Single by Divinyls

from the album Divinyls
- B-side: "Need a Lover"
- Released: 1991
- Recorded: 1990
- Studio: Groove Masters Studio, Santa Monica
- Genre: Rock, pop rock
- Length: 4:38
- Label: Virgin
- Songwriters: Christine Amphlett, Mark McEntee, Martyn Watson
- Producers: Christine Amphlett, Mark McEntee, David Tickle

Divinyls singles chronology
"Love School" (1991)	"Make Out Alright" (1991)	"I'm on Your Side" (1991)

"Make Out Alright" is a song by Australian rock duo Divinyls, released as the third single from their self-titled fourth album in 1991. "Make Out Alright" peaked at No. 105 in Australia.

=== Track listing ===
Australian CD single

1. "Make Out Alright" - 4:38
2. "Need a Lover" - 4:50

Australian 12"/Europe CD single

1. "Make Out Alright" - 4:38
2. "I Touch Myself" (Live)
3. "Need a Lover" - 4:50
