= I Ain't Gonna Eat Out My Heart Anymore =

1965 single by the Young Rascals

- Dutch picture sleeve

Single by the Young Rascals
- B-side: "Slow Down"
- Released: November 22, 1965
- Recorded: September 20, 1965
- Studio: A&R, New York City
- Genre: Rock
- Length: 2:43
- Label: Atlantic
- Songwriters: Pam Sawyer; Laurie Burton
- Producers: Arif Mardin; Tom Dowd

The Young Rascals singles chronology
"I Ain't Gonna Eat Out My Heart Anymore" (1965)	"Good Lovin'" (1966)

"I Ain't Gonna Eat Out My Heart Anymore" is a song written by Pam Sawyer and Laurie Burton in 1965. Originally envisioned to be recorded by a British Invasion artist, the song was extremely well liked by the American rock group the Young Rascals, and they subsequently recorded the song and released it as their debut single in November 1965 through Atlantic Records. Though only a marginal hit, reaching number 52 on the Billboard Hot 100, it largely established the band on the American music scene. It has since been included on several albums by the band, including their eponymous debut album, and several compilation albums, including Time Peace: The Rascals' Greatest Hits, on which it was the opening track.

The song is heavily characterized by lead vocalist Eddie Brigati's spoken word during the verses, and is one of the only songs by the band to feature their initial lineup with Brigati on lead vocals; subsequent releases primarily feature Felix Cavaliere on lead vocals. Upon release it received primarily positive reviews in the American press and charted internationally as well. Retrospectively, the song has also been praised, with many critics noting it to have fallen into obscurity thanks to its relatively low charting compared to their later singles. "I Ain't Gonna Eat Out My Heart Anymore" has since been covered by several notable bands, including The Jackson 5 and the Primitives. Australian band Divinyls and American group Angel both had commercial success with their versions.

== Background ==
Both Pam Sawyer and Laurie Burton were respected songwriters, with Sawyer having written several songs for Motown artists, and Burton having written her own songs. Together, they had also recorded and written music as the Whyte Boots, and had started branching out to other artists as well. According to Burton, "I Ain't Gonna Eat Out My Heart Anymore" was originally intended to be recorded by a British Invasion artist. They changed their mind upon hearing the Young Rascals perform. There, they showcased the song for the group, with Burton playing piano, much to the Young Rascals' liking. The song was one of two Sawyer–Burton compositions recorded by the group, the other being "Baby, Let's Wait" which appears on their debut album.

Formed in early 1965, the Young Rascals quickly became known throughout the music scene in and around New York City. This led the group to quickly garner fans, and as their set-list mostly contained rhythm and blues and soul covers, they eventually received a $15,000 contract with Atlantic Records. As Atlantic's roster at the time only consisted of African American performers, the Young Rascals became the first white band on the label. The first version of "I Ain't Gonna Eat Out My Heart Anymore" was recorded during their second session, held on September 20, 1965, at A & R Recording in New York City. A second version of the song was recorded on November 2, together with what would become the B-side, Larry Williams' "Slow Down. This version remains unreleased.

== Release ==
Atlantic released "I Ain't Gonna Eat Out My Heart Anymore" on November 22, 1965, backed by "Slow Down" as Atlantic 45–2312. Critic Richie Unterberger calls the song an "impressive start". The song stands unique in the fact that it was one of the Young Rascals first and among their only singles using their original line-up Eddie Brigati on lead vocals and percussion, Felix Cavaliere on keyboards and backing vocals, Gene Cornish on guitar and backing vocals, and Dino Danelli on drums; Cavaliere would pick up singing duties on the following single "Good Lovin'", and would assume this role for most of band's future recording career. Cornish stated that the single initially was off to a slow-start, initially charting only locally on the East Coast. Upon the group's first tour to Los Angeles four weeks after the single was released, the band broke attendance record at the Whisky a Go Go and subsequently received airplay on the West Coast as well. As Cornish puts it, "it never had concentrated airplay throughout the entire country all at one time" as it had dropped off most charts on the east coast by then.

Besides local charts, "I Ain't Gonna Eat Out My Heart Anymore" also sold enough copies to chart on a national level. The single initially entered the Billboard Hot 100 on December 25 at a position of number 94. It then spent several weeks slowly creeping up the chart, before finally reaching its peak at number 52 on February 5, 1966. It dropped out of the charts on February 19, at a position of number 72. It fared slightly worse on the Cashbox Top 100, entering the chart on December 11, 1965, at a position of 100. It peaked more than a month later, on January 29, when it reached number 63. It dropped out of the chart that same day. Internationally, the single was also noted in Australia, where it breached the top-50, reaching number 48. The single was most successful in Canada, where it reached number 23 on the RPM charts.

Both sides of the single experienced their first album release on The Young Rascals, the group's debut album, which was released on March 28, 1966. As this album was issued in both stereo and mono, this meant that its initial release in stereo came on the album. Most singles at the time were only released in mono. The song has also been released on various compilation albums by the group, most notably Time Peace: The Rascals' Greatest Hits, which reached number one on the Billboard 200. On the album it was used as the opening track.

== Reception and legacy ==
It received primarily positive reviews in the American press upon initial release. In a review for Billboard, the anonymous critic writes that this "debut of new foursome proves a hot entry for chart action." They positively note the slow arrangement, considering it "right up the teen market." They also predicted it to reach the top-60. In Cashbox, the critic starts by writing that the Young Rascals were one of the most "discussed new groups" from New York City, which led to this "auspicious initial deck". They note that "I Ain't Gonna Eat Out My Heart Anymore" should create "even more excitement for the crew". They write that the song is an apparent ode about a "love-sick guy" who eventually gets over it, which the critic largely attributes to the song's "hard-driving", "pulsating and dancable riff". In Record World, the single was chosen as a "sleeper of the week." According to the critic, the single affirms the Young Rascals reputation "as a crowd to watch", along with continuing their reputation as "being something else."

Retrospectively, the song has also been singled out for praise. Unterberger writes that "I Ain't Gonna Eat Out My Heart Anymore" was, together with "Good Lovin'" and "Baby, Let's Wait" one of the highlights on The Young Rascals. In a review for AllMusic, critic Matthew Greenwald states that this "angst-ridden teenage ballad" was the world's introduction to the Young Rascals. He claims that the song has a "Stonsey, garage band grunge to it", while simultaneously praising the inclusion of rhythm and blues. Though he writes that the song isn't one of the group's strongest, he ends by saying that it "paved the way for a promising future for the group." Charles Andrews of Santa Monica Daily Press writes that the song is "better stuff than most bands can manage in a year", while Ben Wener of Orange County Register calls it a "stomping garage rock classic." Guitarist Steven Van Zandt has stated that upon hearing the song for the first time in the 1960s, it was "sexier than the sex I was having with my girlfriend."

== Charts ==
Chart performance for "I Ain't Gonna Eat Out My Heart Anymore"
Chart (1965–66)	Peak position
Australia (Kent Music Report)	48
Canada (RPM) Top Singles	23
US Billboard Hot 100	52
US Cashbox Top 100	63
US Record World 100 Top Pops	62

== Later versions ==
=== Divinyls version ===
"I Ain't Gonna Eat Out My Heart Anymore"

Single by Divinyls

from the album Buffy the Vampire Slayer and The Collection
- Released: 5 October 1992
- Genre: Rock
- Length: 4:30
- Label: Chrysalis
- Songwriters: Pam Sawyer; Laurie Burton
- Producers: Christina Amphlett; Mark McEntee; Charley Drayton

Divinyls singles chronology
"I'm On Your Side" (1991)	"I Ain't Gonna Eat Out My Heart Anymore" (1992)	"Wild Thing" (1993)

Background

In late 1992, Australian rock duo Divinyls recorded the song for the soundtrack to the film Buffy the Vampire Slayer. It was also issued as the lead single from their second compilation album, The Collection. The single went to the top twenty in Australia, peaking at number nineteen, and spent sixteen weeks in the top fifty. According to writer Paul Cashmere, Mark McEntee put his mark on the song through his reworking of the song's riff, which makes the song an entirely other version than the Rascals. Writing for BuzzFeed, Summer Ante Burton lists it as her "sleeper favorite" in Buffy the Vampire Slayer, writing that it is a fantastic rework of "an amazing and underrated '60s classic", and notes that due to the comedy horror found in the movie, "I Ain't Gonna Eat Out My Heart Anymore" was ironically fitting.

=== Charts ===
Chart performance for "I Ain't Gonna Eat Out My Heart Anymore"
Chart (1992–93)	Peak position
Australia (ARIA)	19

=== Other renditions ===
In 1966 the UK band the Primitives covered the song in Italian. The song was called "Yeeeeeeh!" and became a hit in Italy. The Jackson 5 recorded the song in 1971 during the sessions for their studio album Maybe Tomorrow, but it remained unreleased until its inclusion on their 1979 compilation album, Boogie. The song was recorded by glam rock band Angel in 1978 for their album White Hot. It was the band's only Top 50 hit, reaching number 44 on the Billboard Hot 100 that year. American singer Tiffany covered the song in 1988. The cover was originally going to be included in her second album Hold an Old Friend's Hand, but was later removed for unknown reasons. It would later be included in the 2005 re-release of her fourth album Dreams Never Die.

== See also ==
- The Rascals discography
- Divinyls discography
