= Temperamental (Divinyls album) =

Studio album by Divinyls
- Released: 1988
- Recorded: 1987–88
- Studio: Sunset Sound Recorders, Los Angeles
- Genre: Rock
- Length: 47:32
- Label: Chrysalis
- Producer: Mike Chapman

Divinyls chronology
What a Life! (1985)	Temperamental (1988)	Divinyls (1991)

Singles from Temperamental
- 1. "Back to the Wall" Released: 8 February 1988; 2. "Hey Little Boy" Released: 10 July 1988; 3. "Punxsie" Released: 1988

Professional ratings
Review scores
Source	Rating
AllMusic	3/5 stars

Temperamental is the third album by Australian band Divinyls, released in 1988 (see 1988 in music) by Chrysalis Records. Three singles were lifted from the album – "Back to the Wall", their cover of Syndicate of Sound's "Hey Little Boy" and "Punxsie".

The album reached No. 11 in Australia, but despite heavy promotion, was the last to be released through Chrysalis. Amphlett explained: "We still owed them more than a million dollars – unpaid reimbursement of their advances for recording, distributing and promoting three albums, and supporting all those tours, yet they let us off the hook. Chrysalis knew, as did we, that we'd never be able to repay such a sum. They figured that because Temperamental hadn't broken us in the States, we were never going to make it there and they'd be smarter to write off our debt as a tax deduction. 'It's time to split', they said. 'We can't do anything more with Divinyls'."

Amphlett believed the album contained some of the band's best songs, written "throughout the emotional maelstrom of the exits of (manager) Vince (Lovegrove), Bjarne, Rick and JJ", including "Back to the Wall", "Punxsie" and "Better Days", as well as "Hey Little Boy".

== Background and recording ==
Rehearsals began in Los Angeles in October 1986, with the band by then reduced to just singer Chrissy Amphlett and guitarist Mark McEntee. Guitarist Bjarne Ohlin had already left and drummer JJ Harris was sacked at the insistence of producer Mike Chapman, who regarded him as inadequate for the task. The band's label, Chrysalis Records, told Amphlett and McEntee it regarded the album as a make-or-break record, following the lacklustre sales performance of its predecessor, What a Life!. The pair returned to Australia in December 1986 for a series of Australian Made gigs in the capital cities, with Divinyls joining a lineup that included Mental As Anything, I'm Talking, The Triffids, The Saints, Models, Jimmy Barnes and INXS. Amphlett and McEntee were supported on stage by Rick Grossman (bass), Kenny Lyon (keyboards) and Americans Tommy Cain (drums) and Frank Infante (guitar).

Grossman quit at the close of the Australian Made tour and checked into a rehabilitation clinic for treatment for heroin addiction and Amphlett and McEntee returned to Los Angeles in 1987 to begin recording. The new lineup for the album included Lyon, Machinations drummer Warren McLean and Tootieville bassist Tim Millikan. Recording began at Rumbo Recorders, but ceased after complaints about noise by Neil Diamond, who was recording in the next studio. The band transferred to Sunset Sound Recorders with Chapman to complete the album.

== Reception ==
Spin said the album was, "the sort of inspired, tuneful pop no one seems capable of making anymore. Christina Amphlett has a strong, fearless vocal presence, almost like a female Eddie Cochran, unafraid of whatever whoops or hiccups get into the words."

== Track listing ==
All tracks composed by Christine Amphlett and Mark McEntee; except where noted.

1. "Temperamental" − 4:30
2. "Back to the Wall" (Amphlett, McEntee, Richard Feldman) − 4:38
3. "Hey Little Boy" (Don Baskin, Bob Gonzales) − 3:21
4. "Punxsie" − 4:16
5. "Dance of Love" − 4:04
6. "Better Days" − 4:00
7. "Dirty Love" − 4:35
8. "Because" − 4:06
9. "Fighting" − 3:45
10. "Run-a-Way Train" − 4:30
11. "Out of Time" [CD-only bonus track; not on LP] − 5:46

== Personnel ==
- Christine Amphlett − vocals
- Mark McEntee − guitars, vocals
- Tom Lang – guitar, piano, Hammond organ, backing vocals
- Warren McLean − drums
- Tim Millikan − bass

Technical

- Mike Chapman − producer
- Bob Clearmountain – mixing (all tracks except "Fighting", "Run-a-Way Train", "Out of Time")
- Hubert Kretzschmar – design, photography

== Charts ==
Chart (1988)	Peak position
Australian Album (ARIA)	11

== Certifications ==
Region	Certification	Certified units/sales
Australia (ARIA)	Gold	35,000^{^}
^{^} Shipments figures based on certification alone.
