= Back to the Wall (song) =

Single by Divinyls

from the album Temperamental
- B-side: "Fighting"; "Out of Time"
- Released: 8 February 1988
- Recorded: 1988
- Genre: Rock
- Length: 4:38
- Label: Chrysalis Records
- Songwriter(s): Chrissy Amphlett; Mark McEntee; Richard Feldman
- Producer(s): Mike Chapman

Divinyls singles chronology
"Heart Telegraph" (1986)	"Back to the Wall" (1988)	"Hey Little Boy" (1988)

"Back to the Wall" is a song by Australian rock band Divinyls. Released in February 1988 as the lead single from their third studio album Temperamental, the song made the top forty on the Australian singles chart.

== Background ==
By October 1986, Divinyls had been reduced to the duo of Christina Amphlett and Mark McEntee. Their third studio album Temperamental was in the recording stages and their label Chrysalis Records informed them that it would be make-or-break record, largely depending on whether it received attention internationally such as in the US.

== Legacy ==
The song was played in the 1988 horror film A Nightmare on Elm Street 4: The Dream Master and is on the soundtrack to the film.

In 2018, the song was covered by Tropical Fuck Storm and appeared as the b-side to their single "You Let My Tyres Down". The cover garnered praise and has been called "a spine-tingling take on an underrated Divinyls classic [...] [T]he vocal delivery of Fiona Kitschin and Erica Dunn, at once fierce and vulnerable, lends a prescient edge to Chrissy Amphlett’s lyrics: "We are living in desperate times / These are desperate times, my dear"." Kitschin herself called it "a really timely song [...] written and sung by a woman, so it made sense to be performed by the women in the band."

== Track listing ==
Australian 7" single

1. "Back to the Wall" - 4:38
2. "Fighting" - 3:45

Australian 12" single

1. "Back to the Wall" - 4:38
2. "Fighting" - 3:45
3. "Out of Time" - 5:46

== Charts ==
Chart (1988)	Peak position
Australia (Australian Music Report)	33
