= Punxsie =

Song by Divinyls

Single by Divinyls

from the album Temperamental
- B-side: "Victoria"
- Released: 1988
- Recorded: 1988
- Genre: Rock, soft rock
- Length: 4:16
- Label: Chrysalis Records
- Songwriter(s): Chrissy Amphlett, Mark McEntee
- Producer(s): Mike Chapman

Divinyls singles chronology
| "Hey Little Boy" (1988) | "Punxsie" (1988) | "I Touch Myself" (1990) |

"Punxsie" is a song by Australian rock duo Divinyls. The song was released as a limited edition 7" single, in late 1988 as the third and final single from their third album Temperamental. "Punxsie" did not chart in Australia.

== Track listing ==
Australian 7" Single

1. "Punxsie" - 4:16
2. "Victoria" - 3:33
