= I'm Jealous =

Single by Divinyls

from the album Underworld
- B-side: "Black Magic"
- Released: 13 February 1995
- Recorded: July 1994
- Genre: Rock, soft rock
- Length: 4:16
- Label: Ariola Records
- Songwriter(s): Christine Amphlett, Billy Steinberg, Tom Kelly
- Producer(s): Peter Collins

Divinyls singles chronology
"Love Is the Drug" (1993)	"I'm Jealous" (1995)	"Heart of Steel" (1995)

"I'm Jealous" is a song by Australian rock duo Divinyls, released in 1995 as the lead single from their fifth studio album Underworld. The song enjoyed success in Australia where it made the top twenty, peaking at number fourteen and spending nineteen weeks in the top fifty. In addition, the single was certified gold and ranked in as the sixty-fourth best selling single of 1995. The song also appeared in the 1994 soundtrack of Melrose Place.

== Background ==
In 1991, Divinyls scored the biggest hit of their career with "I Touch Myself", which went to number one in Australia as well as the top five in the US and top ten in the UK. This undoubtedly helped to prolong their success for the '90s, after having been a successful group throughout the 1980s. "I'm Jealous" was written by lead singer Christina Amphlett with the songwriting duo Billy Steinberg and Tom Kelly, who had also co-written "I Touch Myself". The track was produced by Peter Collins and was recorded in Nashville, Tennessee, United States in July 1994.

== Chart performance ==
"I'm Jealous" debuted at number thirty-seven on the ARIA Singles Chart in March 1995. It rose up the charts, eventually peaking at number fourteen and was certified gold for sales of 35,000 copies. The single spent a total of nineteen weeks in the top fifty and became the sixty-fourth highest selling single of the year. Despite the success of "I'm Jealous", the album Underworld did not perform well. The fact that the album was released more than one year after the single due to production delays could be seen as the reason for it only scraping in the top fifty on the ARIA Albums Chart. To date, "I'm Jealous" remains the Divinyls last top fifty entry.

== Track listing ==
Australian CD single

1. "I'm Jealous" – 4:16
2. "Black Magic" – 5:37
3. "Black Magic" (Instrumental) – 5:35

== Charts ==
=== Weekly charts ===
Chart (1995)	Peak position
Australia (ARIA)	14

=== End of year charts ===
Chart (1995)	Position
Australia (ARIA)	64
