= Monkey Grip (soundtrack) =

Soundtrack album by Divinyls
- Released: May 1982
- Recorded: 1981–1982
- Genre: Pub rock
- Length: 23:02
- Label: WEA
- Producer: Mark Opitz

Divinyls chronology
Monkey Grip (1982)	Desperate (1983)

Singles from Monkey Grip
- 1. "Boys in Town" Released: September 1981

Monkey Grip is a soundtrack to the film of the same name, with songs provided by Australian rock band Divinyls. The movie is an adaptation by director Ken Cameron of Helen Garner's novel Monkey Grip. The movie had little impact at the box office, taking only A$451,000. The soundtrack was released in May 1982 and peaked at #25 on the Australian Kent Music Report album chart. The soundtrack contains the band's first single, "Boys in Town", as well as "Only Lonely", "Elsie" and "Only You" – all of which are featured on the international version of the Divinyls' first studio album, Desperate. Monkey Grip also features two other songs "Gonna Get You" and "Girlfriends". Christina Amphlett also co-starred in the movie Monkey Grip, playing a temperamental rock singer loosely based on herself, fronting a band played by fellow Divinyls members.

The first version of the music video for "Only Lonely" was filmed on the rooftop of the Strawberry Hills Hotel, Devonshire Street, Surry Hills in 1982.

At the 1982 Countdown Music Awards, the album was nominated for Best Debut Album.

== Track listing ==
1. "Boys in Town" - 2:50
2. "Only Lonely" - 3:15
3. "Elsie" - 6:42
4. "Elsie (Reprise)" - 2:47
5. "Only You" - 2:48
6. "Gonna Get You" (Mark McEntee) - 2:46
7. "Girlfriends" - 3:14

All tracks composed by Christina Amphlett and Mark Entee, except where noted

== Personnel ==
- Jeremy Paul – bass
- Richard Harvey – drums
- Bjarne Ohlin – guitar, keyboards
- Mark McEntee – guitar, vocals
- Christine Amphlett – vocals

== Charts ==
Chart (1982)	Peak position
Australia (Kent Music Report)	25
