= Sleeping Beauty (song) =

Single by Divinyls

from the album What a Life!
- B-side: "Motion"
- Released: December 1985
- Genre: Pop rock
- Length: 3:38
- Label: Chrysalis Records
- Songwriter(s): Christine Amphlett, Mark McEntee
- Producer(s): Mike Chapman

Divinyls singles chronology
"Pleasure and Pain" (1985)	"Sleeping Beauty" (1985)	"Heart Telegraph" (1986)

"Sleeping Beauty" is a song by Australian rock band Divinyls. It was released in December 1985 as the fourth single from their second studio album What a Life!. The song proved to be a minor success in Australia when it peaked at number fifty.

== Background ==
"Sleeping Beauty" was written by Mark McEntee and lead singer Christina Amphlett. The song was produced by Mike Chapman, who also went on to produce the final recording stages of What a Life! and Divinyls next album Temperamental.

== Track listing ==
Australian 7" Single

1. "Sleeping Beauty" - 3:38
2. "Motion" - 3:36

Australian & German 12" Single

1. "Sleeping Beauty" (Extended Mix) - 5:01
2. "Motion" - 3:36
3. "Sleeping Beauty" (Instrumental) - 3:36

== Charts ==
Chart (1985)	Peak position
Australia (Kent Music Report)	50
