= Wheels & Dollbaby =

Australian fashion label

Wheels & Dollbaby is a fashion label based in Australia, founded by Melanie Greensmith.

Wheels & Dollbaby first opened in 1987 in Hay Street, Perth before relocating to Crown Street in Darlinghurst, Sydney. In 2008, the brand opened a boutique in Perth.

Melanie started her career with $5000AUD in a small store in the then hip Surry Hills area of Sydney, which soon became a brand selling globally to the likes of luxury stores such as Harvey Nichols, Harrods & Selfridges in London. Stores throughout the US and Australia also stocked her rock 'n' roll clothing. Her rock and rock luxury aesthetic has been worn by some of the biggest stars in the world such as, Michael Jackson, Kate Moss, Debbie Harry, Mick Jagger, Katy Perry, Amy Winehouse, Slash, Bob Dylan, Jerry Hall, Pamela Anderson, Chrissie Hynde and Britney Spears. Wheels and Dollbaby have been featured in many films, music videos and commercials. Wheels and Dollbaby since 2005 also has an enormously successful cardigan collaboration with Dita Von Teese that is a coveted and wildly collected item.

In October 2017, Greensmith announced she was closing the business after thirty years, saying it was time to move on, but that she did not want to sell the company or the brand. Melanie Greensmith since then relaunched the brand and the business in 2020.
