= Siren (Never Let You Go) =

Single by Divinyls

from the album Desperate
- B-side: "Elsie"
- Released: April 1983
- Genre: New wave, pub rock
- Length: 2:28
- Label: Chrysalis Records
- Songwriter(s): Bjarne Ohlin
- Producer(s): Mark Opitz

Divinyls singles chronology
"Science Fiction" (1982)	"Siren (Never Let You Go)" (1983)	"Casual Encounter" (1983)

Music video
- "Siren (Never Let You Go)" on YouTube

"Siren (Never Let You Go)" (a.k.a. "Siren") is a rock song by Australian band Divinyls. It was released in 1983 from their debut album Desperate and charted within the top fifty in Australia.

== Song information ==
"Siren" was written by then band member Bjarne Ohlin who played guitar and provided backing vocals. It was released as the official second single from Desperate after "Science Fiction", which had been a big hit for the band, reaching the top twenty.

"Siren" proved to only be a minor success when released, peaking at number forty-five on the Australian singles chart.

== Track listing ==
Australian 7" Single

1. "Siren (Never Let You Go)" - 2:28
2. "Elsie" (American version) - 6:44

== Charts ==
Chart (1983)	Peak position
Australian (Kent Music Report)	45
