= Science Fiction (song) =

- 7" vinyl release

Single by Divinyls

from the album Desperate
- A-side: "Science Fiction"
- B-side: "I'll Make You Happy"
- Released: 6 December 1982
- Recorded: 1982
- Genre: New wave
- Length: 3:32
- Label: Chrysalis
- Songwriters: Christine Amphlett; Mark McEntee
- Producer: Mark Opitz

Divinyls singles chronology
"Boys in Town" (1981)	"Science Fiction" (1982)	"Siren" (1983)

"Science Fiction" is a song by Australian new wave band Divinyls, which was the lead single from their first studio album Desperate. Released in December 1982, "Science Fiction", peaked at No. 13 on the Australian Kent Music Report Singles Chart. The B-side, "I'll Make You Happy" is a cover of The Easybeats 1966 hit.

In May 2001, "Science Fiction" was selected by Australasian Performing Right Association (APRA) as one of the Top 30 Australian songs of all time.

== Background ==
Christina Amphlett and Mark McEntee (ex-Air Supply) met at the Sydney Opera House where Amphlett was singing in a choral concert in 1980. They recruited Jeremy Paul (ex-Air Supply), Bjarne Ohlin and Richard Harvey, and they provided the soundtrack for the film Monkey Grip (1982). The group released two singles from the soundtrack, Music from Monkey Grip EP, "Boys in Town", which reached No. 8 on the national singles chart, and "Only Lonely". Original bassist Jeremy Paul left before the movie or first single were released. He was replaced on bass, eventually by Rick Grossman (ex Matt Finish).

After releasing Music from Monkey Grip EP on WEA in 1982, Divinyls released their first studio album Desperate on Chrysalis Records in 1983. The album included the No. 13 hit on the Australian Kent Music Report Singles Chart, "Science Fiction" . Their early manager Vince Lovegrove was former co-lead vocalist of 1960s pop band The Valentines with Bon Scott (later in AC/DC); Lovegrove had organised Divinyls' transfer from WEA to Chrysalis and their first tours of United States. The B-side of this single is their cover version of The Easybeats' 1966 hit "I'll Make You Happy".

== Track listing ==
1. "Science Fiction" (Christina Amphlett, Mark McEntee) – 3:32
2. "I'll Make You Happy" (Stevie Wright, George Young) – 3:21

== Personnel ==
Divinyls members

- Christine Amphlett – vocals
- Mark McEntee – guitar
- Bjarne Ohlin – keyboards, guitar, backing vocals
- Richard Harvey – drums
- Rick Grossman – bass guitar

Additional musicians

Production details

- Producer – Mark Opitz

== Charts ==
=== Weekly charts ===
Chart (1982–1983)	Peak position
Australia (Kent Music Report)	13

=== Year end charts ===
Chart (1983)	Position
Australia (Kent Music Report)	96
