= Boys in Town =

1981 single by Divinyls

Single by Divinyls

from the album Monkey Grip and Desperate
- B-side: "Only You"
- Released: September 1981
- Recorded: 1981
- Genre: Pub rock, new wave
- Length: 2:50
- Label: WEA
- Songwriters: Christina Amphlett; Mark McEntee; Jeremy Paul
- Producers: Christina Amphlett, Mark McEntee

Divinyls singles chronology
"Boys in Town" (1981)	"Science Fiction" (1982)

Music video
- "Boys in Town" on YouTube

Audio
- "Boys in Town" on YouTube

"Boys in Town" is the debut single by Australian rock band Divinyls, released in 1981. The song was written in 1979 and was used on the soundtrack of the 1982 film Monkey Grip, along with several other Divinyls tracks written and recorded for the film, including the single's b-side "Only You". "Boys in Town" was also included on the international version of the Divinyls 1983 debut studio album, Desperate. The song became a success in Australia, entering the singles chart top ten and peaking at number eight.

== Background ==
Divinyls formed in 1980, fronted by lead singer Christina Amphlett. After scoring several gigs in pubs and clubs, the group was discovered by Australian film director Ken Cameron, who was in the midst of making the movie Monkey Grip, based on the novel of the same name by Helen Garner. That discovery led to Divinyls providing the entire soundtrack for the film, and also resulted in Amphlett getting a supporting role, playing a temperamental rock singer, based on herself. "Boys in Town", from the soundtrack, was released as the band's debut single, and garnered commercial success, reaching the top ten on the Australian singles chart. It was the first song that Amphlett and McEntee had written together.

When Divinyls released their debut studio album Desperate in 1983, four of the songs from the Monkey Grip soundtrack were included, in particular "Boys in Town". However, "Boys in Town", and the other songs previously seen on Monkey Grip, were omitted from Australian release of Desperate. "Boys in Town" was also released in Canada on the K-tel compilation album entitled Rock '83.

== Reception ==
At the 1981 Countdown Music Awards, the song was nominated for Best Australian Single.

In January 2018, as part of Triple M's "Ozzest 100", the 'most Australian' songs of all time, "Boys in Town" was ranked number 83.

Named by Double J as one of the best debut singles of all time, they said, "'Get me out of here.' There is a whole world in those five words. A million songs, a thousand books and films. Every small town. Every mistake. Billions of dreams of starting over. 'Boys in Town' couldn't lose with a line like that and 21-year-old Christine Joy Amphlett knew it."

== Track listing ==
Australian 7" single

1. "Boys in Town" – 2:50
2. "Only You" – 2:48

== Charts ==
=== Weekly charts ===
Chart (1981)	Peak position
Australia (Kent Music Report)	8

=== Year-end charts ===
Chart (1981)	Rank
Australia (Kent Music Report)	76
