= Monkey Grip (film) =

1982 film

- Directed by: Ken Cameron
- Written by: Ken Cameron; Helen Garner
- Produced by: Danny Collins; Treisha Ghent; Patricia Lovell
- Starring: Noni Hazlehurst
- Cinematography: David Gribble
- Edited by: David Huggett
- Music by: Bruce Smeaton
- Production company: Pavilion Films
- Distributed by: Roadshow
- Release date: 17 June 1982
- Running time: 99 minutes
- Country: Australia
- Language: English
- Budget: A$1 million

Monkey Grip is a 1982 Australian drama film directed by Ken Cameron. It is based on the novel, also titled Monkey Grip (1977), by Helen Garner. It was screened in the Un Certain Regard section the 1982 Cannes Film Festival. The film was produced by Patricia Lovell and stars Noni Hazelhurst and Colin Friels, and featured an original soundtrack by Australian rock band the Divinyls.

== Plot ==
Nora, a single-mother in her thirties living in Melbourne is engaged in an on-again off-again relationship with the heroin addict Javo, who can never quite decide whether he wants his freedom, or romantic commitment. The further their relationship progresses, the harder they find it to let go.

== Cast ==
- Noni Hazlehurst as Nora
- Colin Friels as Javo
- Alice Garner as Gracie
- Harold Hopkins as Willie
- Candy Raymond as Lillian
- Michael Caton as Clive
- Tim Burns as Martin
- Christina Amphlett as Angela
- Don Miller-Robinson as Gerald
- Lisa Peers as Rita
- Cathy Downes as Eve
- Justin Ridley as Roaster
- Pearl Christie as Juliet
- Vera Plevnik as Jessie
- Jamie Fonti as Ramondo
- Carole Skinner as Waitress
- Esben Storm as Record producer
- Gary Waddell as Actor 3

== Production ==
Ken Cameron tried to get up a film version of Helen Garner's novel in early 1979 but could not raise the budget of $553,000.

David Puttnam read the script and said the film "is a problem because it's an honourable, decent piece of material but a very difficult film to crack. I really like Ken Cameron, he's a good bloke, but it's a very difficult piece to do and I hope he pulls it off."

Shooting was postponed until Patricia Lovell managed to get the money under 10BA tax regulations. However, by then costs had risen so much the film had to be made for $1 million. The film was shot in early 1981. The story is set in Melbourne but only one week of filming took place there, with Sydney standing in for the location. The Fitzroy Pool was recreated in Sydney's Ryde pool. The iconic Deep Water Aqua Profonda sign, at the Fitzroy public swimming pool, was economically reused as the album cover in the film.

Scriptwriter/ producer Briann Kearney was Production Co-ordinator.

== Box office ==
Monkey Grip grossed $451,000 at the box office in Australia, which is equivalent to $1,312,410 in 2009 dollars. However it struggled to find distribution overseas.

== Reception ==
The film received mixed reviews. Helen Garner, who wrote the novel upon which the film was based, had a problem with the casting of Colin Friels as a heroin addict. She stated: "I just can't believe they cast Colin Friels as the junkie. That was such a terrible mistake. He was so healthy, a great big bouncing muscly surfing guy".

== Home media ==
Umbrella Entertainment has released it in a three-disc DVD set with Puberty Blues and Dimboola.
