= Charley Drayton =

American drummer

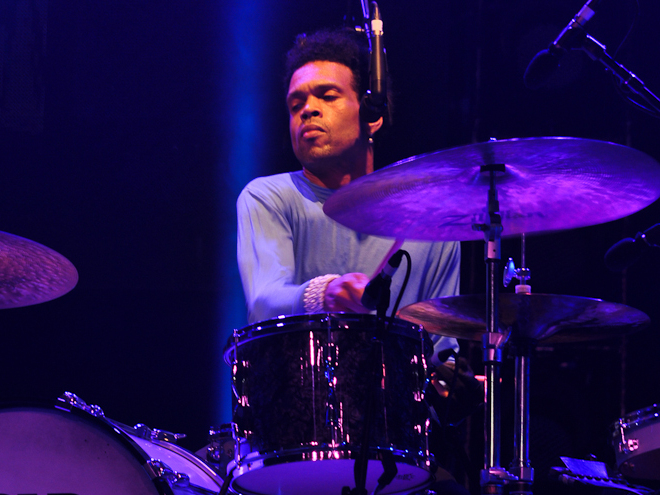
- Drayton performing with Cold Chisel in 2012

Background information
- Genres: Rock; pop
- Occupations: Musician; producer
- Instruments: Drums; bass
- Member of: Cold Chisel
- Formerly of: The Dead Daisies; Divinyls

Charley Drayton is an American drummer and bassist. He has recorded or performed with artists such as Cold Chisel, the Cult, Keith Richards, the Rolling Stones, Paul Simon, Neil Young, Miles Davis, Herbie Hancock, Johnny Cash, The Replacements, Chaka Khan, Mariah Carey, Seal, Bob Dylan, Iggy Pop, Janet Jackson, Courtney Love, Divinyls and Michelle Branch.

== Career ==
In 1985, Drayton contributed percussion work on the Rolling Stones' album Dirty Work, which led Keith Richards to ask him to become a founding member of his side project X-pensive Winos in 1987. As bassist, Drayton toured and recorded with Richards and the Winos until December 1992, and played on their albums Talk Is Cheap and Main Offender, and the live album and video Live at the Hollywood Palladium, December 15, 1988.

He played bass on the Cult's 1991 album Ceremony.

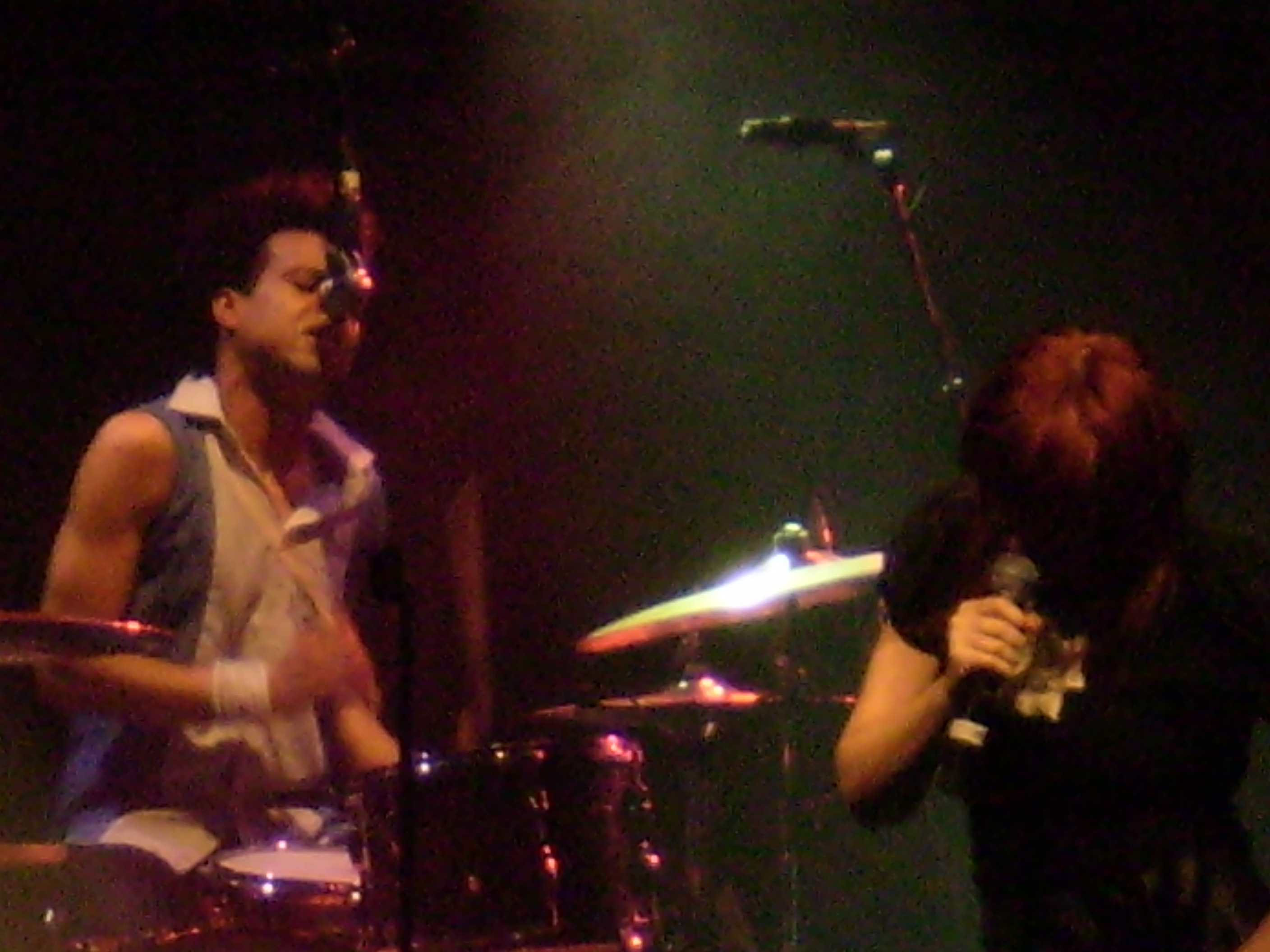
Drayton and Chrissy Amphlett with Divinyls in 2007.

He played drums on two albums for Australian band Divinyls: 1991's Divinyls and 1996's Underworld (which he also produced), the band's last album before their hiatus in late 1996. In 2007, Divinyls reformed and Drayton played drums in their touring band and in their new recording sessions, also producing the band's new album.

Drayton co-produced and played various instruments on Fiona Apple's album The Idler Wheel..., released in June 2012.

Drayton played with the New Pornographers after the ouster of Joe Seiders, helping to record their album The Former Site Of. Josh Wells was subsequently named as the drummer for their ensuing tour.

== Personal life ==
Drayton married Australian musician Chrissy Amphlett (lead singer of the Divinyls) in 1999. Drayton and Amphlett remained married until her death on April 21, 2013. Drayton has a child with Adria Petty, daughter of Tom Petty.

== Collaborations ==
With Keith Richards

- Talk Is Cheap (Virgin Records, 1988)
- Main Offender (Virgin Records, 1992)

With Divinyls

- Divinyls (Virgin Records, 1991)
- Underworld (Virgin Records, 1996)

With Fiona Apple

- The Idler Wheel Is Wiser Than the Driver of the Screw and Whipping Cords Will Serve You More Than Ropes Will Ever Do (Clean Slate Records, 2012)
