= Hey Little Boy =

Single by Divinyls

from the album Temperamental
- B-side: "Para-Dice"
- Released: 10 July 1988
- Recorded: 1988
- Genre: Pub rock
- Length: 3:21
- Label: Chrysalis Records
- Songwriters: Don Baskin, Bob Gonzales
- Producer: Mike Chapman

Divinyls singles chronology
"Back to the Wall" (1988)	"Hey Little Boy" (1988)	"Punxsie" (1988)

"Hey Little Boy" is a rock song by Australian band Divinyls, released as the second single from their 1988 album Temperamental. It is a cover version of the 1966 song "Little Girl" by American rock 'n' roll band Syndicate of Sound. However, when Divinyls recorded their version of the song, they had the gender roles reversed. It peaked at number twenty-three on the Australian singles chart and spent twelve weeks in the top fifty.

== Track listing ==
Australian 7" single

1. "Hey Little Boy" - 3:21
2. "Para-Dice" - 3:53 (song appears on Divinyls previous album What a Life!)

U.S. 7" single

1. "Hey Little Boy" (Edit)
2. "Fighting"

U.S. 12" Promo Single

1. "Hey Little Boy"
2. "Hey Little Boy" (Bob Clearmountain Mix)

== Charts ==
Chart (1988)	Peak position
Australia (ARIA)	23
