= Pleasure and Pain (song) =

Single by Divinyls

from the album What a Life!
- B-side: "What a Life!"; "Heart Telegraph"
- Released: 2 September 1985
- Genre: Rock, new wave
- Length: 3:50
- Label: Chrysalis
- Songwriter(s): Mike Chapman, Holly Knight
- Producer(s): Mike Chapman

Divinyls singles chronology
"In My Life" (1984)	"Pleasure and Pain" (1985)	"Sleeping Beauty" (1986)

"Pleasure and Pain" is a song written by Mike Chapman and Holly Knight, produced by Chapman for Divinyls' second studio album What a Life! (1985). It was released as the album's third single in the formats of 7-inch single and 12" single. It became one of their most successful songs, charting at No. 11 in Australia, No. 8 in New Zealand and No. 76 in the United States.

== Reception ==
Junkee said, "Literally any Divinyls song ever recorded could have been called "Pleasure & Pain". Chrissy Amphlett’s titanic voice was all about pushing prettiness until it became punishing. "Pleasure & Pain" is a leather boot, pinned directly into your chest."

In January 2018, as part of Triple M's "Ozzest 100", the 'most Australian' songs of all time, "Pleasure and Pain" was ranked number 43.

== Formats and track listing ==
Australian 7-inch single

1. "Pleasure and Pain"
2. "What a Life!"

Australian 12" single

1. "Pleasure and Pain" (extended mix)
2. "Pleasure and Pain" (instrumental extended mix)
3. "What a Life!"

US 7-inch single

1. "Pleasure and Pain"
2. "Heart Telegraph"

US 12" single

1. "Pleasure and Pain" – 5:58
2. "Pleasure and Pain" (instrumental) – 6:25

== Charts ==
=== Weekly charts ===
Chart (1985–1986)	Peak position
Australia (Kent Music Report)	11
New Zealand (Recorded Music NZ)	8
US Billboard Hot 100	76
US Billboard Mainstream Rock Tracks	12

==== Year-end charts ====
Chart (1985)	Position
Australia (Kent Music Report)	70

== In other media ==
- In 2016, the song appeared in the season 4 premiere of the prison television series, Wentworth.
