= I Touch Myself =

1990 single by Divinyls

Single by Divinyls

from the album Divinyls
- B-side: "Follow Through"
- Written: 1990
- Released: 19 November 1990
- Studio: Groove Masters (Santa Monica, California)
- Genre: Soft rock; pub rock
- Length: 3:44
- Label: Virgin
- Songwriters: Christine Amphlett; Mark McEntee; Tom Kelly; Billy Steinberg
- Producers: Christine Amphlett; Mark McEntee; David Tickle

Divinyls singles chronology
"Punxsie" (1988)	"I Touch Myself" (1990)	"Love School" (1991)

Music video
- "I Touch Myself" on YouTube

"I Touch Myself" is a song recorded by Australian rock band Divinyls. It was written by the songwriting team of Tom Kelly and Billy Steinberg along with Christine Amphlett and Mark McEntee of the Divinyls. It was released in November 1990, by Virgin Records, as the lead single from the band's fourth album, Divinyls (1991), and deals with the subjects of eroticism and female masturbation. The single achieved success, reaching No. 1 in Australia and No. 4 on the US Billboard Hot 100. Its music video was directed by Michael Bay and received three nominations at the 1991 MTV Video Music Awards. In January 2018, Australian network Triple M ranked the song at No. 60 in its list of the "most Australian" songs of all time. In 2025, the song placed 54 on the Triple J Hottest 100 of Australian Songs. In 2023, Billboard magazine ranked it among the "500 Best Pop Songs of All Time".

== Composition and recording ==
Chrissy Amphlett and Mark McEntee wrote the song in 1990 with the songwriting team of Tom Kelly and Billy Steinberg (who had also written songs such as "I'll Stand by You", "Like a Virgin", "Eternal Flame", "True Colors" and "So Emotional"). Steinberg had written the first verse and the chorus lyric for "I Touch Myself". Amphlett liked it immediately, and despite the fact that Steinberg and Kelly rarely collaborated with others, McEntee, Steinberg, Kelly and Amphlett would write the remainder of the song the next day.

The song was recorded to two-inch tape, making it difficult to edit. After much experimentation, the writers devised an unusual song structure with the bridge placed after the first chorus.

"It was also written in a heartfelt way, touching yourself in a heartfelt way. But I like double entendres, so... It didn't worry me at all, because I really liked it but the musicians were shocked. The musicians freaked, and they were really worried for me. I don't think they are now; I think they've come to terms with it."

— Chrissy Amphlett talking about the song.

== Promotion and chart performance ==
In Australia, "I Touch Myself" was released on 19 November 1990 on 7-inch and cassette, and the CD single was released on 3 December 1990. The single debuted at No. 77 on 2 December 1990. On its tenth week on the chart, the song reached No. 1, replacing Vanilla Ice's debut single "Ice Ice Baby", and stayed there for another week. The single was certified platinum in Australia.

"I Touch Myself" debuted on the UK Singles Chart at No. 69 and on its eighth week it peaked at No. 10, spending a total of twelve weeks in the chart. When released in the United States, the song caused a minor controversy. However, it managed to reach the top five of the Billboard Hot 100 chart, peaking at No. 4, and at No. 2 on the Billboard Modern Rock Tracks chart after receiving extensive play on modern rock radio. Divinyls are considered a one-hit wonder in the US, as "I Touch Myself" was their only American top-40 hit.

== Critical reception ==
Alex Henderson from AllMusic described the song as "infectious," while editor Adrian Zupp called it a "lascivious headline-grabber." A reviewer from Billboard magazine named it a "modern rock smash," noting lead singer Christina Amphlett's video appearance as "eye-catching." James Muretich from Calgary Herald joked, "One gathers she's not talking about scratching her nose". Everett True from Melody Maker commented, "Yes, it is about what you think. It's a song about female obsession, gratification, frustration and masturbation which, apparently, Mike Read played on Round Table and then got extremely embarrassed by. He shouldn't have done. It's a song about giving, and giving as much as you can: tantalising, without being titillating. Musically, it's straight-down-the-line mid-American rock (Bangles, Go-Go's). I'm rather fond of it, to tell the truth." Magazine Music & Media wrote that "it will stay in your mind for the rest of the week." Alan Jones from Music Week commented, "'I Touch Myself' has already been a number one single in their native Australia, and is now in the US Top 10. It won't do that well here, but its loose, post-punk execution and killer hook add up to a hit." Caroline Sullivan from Smash Hits called it "one of pop's finer nanoseconds" in her review of the DiVINYLS album.

== Music video ==
The song's accompanying music video, directed by American film director and producer Michael Bay, was nominated for three MTV Video Music Awards, including Video of the Year.

== Impact and legacy ==
In January 2018, Australian network Triple M ranked the song at No. 60 in its list of the "most Australian" songs of all time. In October 2023, Billboard magazine ranked "I Touch Myself" at No. 326 in their "500 Best Pop Songs of All Time" list. In January 2025, American Songwriter ranked the song among "3 of the Best Opening Lines in One-Hit Wonder Songs from the 1990s".

== I Touch Myself Project ==
The I Touch Myself Project was launched in 2014, 12 months after Amphlett's death from breast cancer. Amphlett wanted "I Touch Myself" to be adapted as a global anthem for breast health. The project was created in her honour with its mission to create educational forums to promote self-examination.

In June 2014, Connie Mitchell, Deborah Conway, Kate Ceberano, Katie Noonan, Little Pattie, Megan Washington, Olivia Newton-John, Sarah Blasko, Sarah McLeod and Suze DeMarchi released a version of "I Touch Myself", with each providing her own interpretation and distinct style to the song. This version, credited to the I Touch Myself Project, peaked at No. 72 on the ARIA chart.

In 2016, the I Touch Myself Project partnered with Berlei to create the Chrissy Bra, which reminds women to examine their breasts for anomalies when dressing, and a Chrissy Post-Surgery Bra, designed specifically for women who have undergone breast-cancer surgery.

In 2018, Serena Williams recorded "I Touch Myself" and posted her version on Instagram. It became Instagram's most retweeted post, most widely discussed campaign and most watched video during International Breast Cancer Awareness Month.

== Track listings ==
- 7-inch, cassette, and mini-CD single
- Australian CD single
1. "I Touch Myself"
2. "Follow Through"
- UK 12-inch and CD single
1. "I Touch Myself"
2. "Follow Through"
3. "I Touch Myself" (alternate version)

== Charts ==
=== Weekly charts ===
Weekly chart performance for "I Touch Myself"
Chart (1990–1991)	Peak position
Australia (ARIA)	1
Canada Top Singles (RPM)	13
Europe (Eurochart Hot 100)	40
Europe (European Hit Radio)	23
Ireland (IRMA)	8
Israel (Israeli Singles Chart)	7
Luxembourg (Radio Luxembourg)	10
New Zealand (Recorded Music NZ)	17
UK Singles (Official Charts)	10
UK Airplay (Music Week)	11
US Billboard Hot 100	4
US Album Rock Tracks (Billboard)	35
US Modern Rock Tracks (Billboard)	2
US Cash Box Top 100	6

=== Year-end charts ===
Year-end chart performance for "I Touch Myself"
Chart (1991)	Position
Australia (ARIA)	15
Canada Top Singles (RPM)	97
UK Singles (OCC)	90
US Billboard Hot 100	52
US Modern Rock Tracks (Billboard)	14
US Cash Box Top 100	40

== Certifications ==
Certifications for "I Touch Myself"
Region	Certification	Certified units/sales
Australia (ARIA)	Platinum	70,000^{^}
New Zealand (RMNZ)	Platinum	30,000^{‡}
United Kingdom (BPI)	Silver	200,000^{‡}
^{^} Shipments figures based on certification alone.^{‡} Sales+streaming figures based on certification alone.

== Release history ==
Release dates and formats for "I Touch Myself"
Region	Date	Format(s)	Label(s)	Ref.
Australia	19 November 1990	7-inch vinyl; cassette	Virgin	
Australia	3 December 1990	CD	Virgin	
Japan	21 April 1991	Mini-CD	Virgin	
United Kingdom	29 April 1991	7-inch vinyl; 12-inch vinyl; CD	Virgin	
United Kingdom	7 May 1991	7-inch vinyl postcard pack	Virgin	

== Cover versions ==
- FHM High Street Honeys released a version of the song in 2007, peaking at number 34 on the UK Singles Chart in February 2007.
- Lime Cordiale released a cover of the song in 2019 for Triple J's Like a Version that reached number 17 in the 2019 Triple J Hottest 100.

== Usage in other media ==
The song has been featured in the 1997 comedy film Austin Powers: International Man of Mystery, as a cover version by Scala & Kolacny Brothers during the first episode of the second season of Sex Education and is mentioned in the Friends episode "The One Where Monica Sings". An a cappella version sung by a female choir figured prominently in the first episode of the 2023 comic mystery TV series Deadloch.
