= Divinyls =

Australian rock band

- Divinyls in 1982

Background information
- Origin: Sydney, New South Wales, Australia
- Genres: New wave, pub rock, pop rock
- Years active: 1980–1996, 2006–2009
- Labels: Chrysalis, Virgin, RCA, WEA

Divinyls (/dɪˈvaɪnəlz/) were an Australian rock band that formed in Sydney in 1980. The band primarily consisted of vocalist Chrissy Amphlett and guitarist Mark McEntee. Originally a five-piece, the band underwent numerous line-up changes, with Amphlett and McEntee remaining as core members, before its dissolution in 1996. Amphlett garnered widespread attention for performing on stage in a school uniform and fishnet stockings, and she often used an illuminated neon tube as a prop for displaying aggression towards both band members and the audience.

Divinyls released five studio albums—four placed in the Top 10 Australian chart, while one (Divinyls) reached No. 15 in the United States (US) and No. 33 for 3 weeks in Canada. Their biggest-selling single "I Touch Myself" (1990) achieved a No. 1 ranking in Australia, No. 4 in the United States, No. 10 in the United Kingdom (UK), and No. 13 in Canada.

In May 2001, the Australasian Performing Right Association (APRA), as part of its 75th-anniversary celebrations, named "Science Fiction" as one of the Top 30 Australian songs of all time. The band was inducted into the Australian Recording Industry Association (ARIA) Hall of Fame in 2006 and in late 2007 Amphlett and McEntee reconvened to record a new single and begin working on a new album. The band played a short series of live gigs in Australia in late 2007 and early 2008. Divinyls broke up in 2009. Amphlett died in 2013.

== Career ==
=== 1980s: Formation, Desperate, What a Life!, and Temperamental ===
Amphlett was the first cousin of 1960s Australian pop icon Patricia "Little Pattie" Amphlett. In her autobiography Pleasure and Pain (2005), Amphlett described breaking into the music scene from the age of fourteen, being arrested for busking when seventeen and travelling in Spain, and how her performances drew upon childhood pain.

Amphlett and guitarist Mark McEntee were introduced by Jeremy Paul (ex-Air Supply) in the car park of a small music venue in Collaroy, Sydney, after Amphlett and Paul had finished a gig with their then band, Batonrouge. Amphlett and McEntee met again at the Sydney Opera House where Amphlett and Paul were singing in a choral concert in 1980. They recruited keyboardist Bjarne Ohlin later in 1980 and drummer Richard Harvey in 1981, respectively, and for almost two years they performed in pubs and clubs in Sydney's Kings Cross. During this time, Paul negotiated publishing and recording agreements that led to the band signing with WEA. Australian film director Ken Cameron saw Divinyls performing in a club. This led to them providing the soundtrack for his 1982 film Monkey Grip and also gave Amphlett, Paul and McEntee supporting roles in the movie. The group released two singles from the soundtrack, Music from Monkey Grip EP, "Boys in Town", which reached No. 8 on the national singles chart, and "Only Lonely". The band was the opening act at the 1983 US Festival.

After the band's initial success, original manager and bassist Jeremy Paul left. He was replaced on bass, briefly by Ken Firth (ex-The Ferrets) and more permanently by Rick Grossman (ex-Matt Finish). Grossman left in 1987 to replace Clyde Bramley in Hoodoo Gurus. By early 1988, Divinyls consisted of Amphlett and McEntee with augmentation by additional musicians when recording or touring.

Over the decade Divinyls released four albums, Music from Monkey Grip EP on WEA in 1982, Desperate on Chrysalis Records in 1983, What a Life! in 1985 and Temperamental in 1988. The latter two albums were also released by Chrysalis in the United States. They had hit singles in Australia with, "Science Fiction" No. 13 in 1983, "Good Die Young" No. 32 in 1984 and "Pleasure and Pain" which was written by Holly Knight and Mike Chapman and went No. 11 in 1985. Their later manager Vince Lovegrove organised Divinyls' transfer from WEA to Chrysalis and their first tours of the United States. They established a fan base there, without achieving major commercial success. Divinyls also had Australian hits with cover versions of The Easybeats' "I'll Make You Happy", and Syndicate of Sound's "Hey Little Boy" ("Hey Little Girl" with the gender switched) which reached No. 25 in 1988. Amphlett became a controversial and highly visible celebrity for her brash, overtly sexual persona and subversive humour in lyrics, performances, and media interviews.

=== 1990s: diVINYLS & Underworld ===
In 1991, Divinyls released diVINYLS on Virgin Records and the single "I Touch Myself" which became their only Australian No.1 single. The song reached No. 4 in the United States and No. 10 in the United Kingdom. The majority of Divinyls' hits were co-written by Amphlett and McEntee, but in this case they wrote with Tom Kelly and Billy Steinberg. diVINYLS reached No. 5 on the Australian album charts and No. 15 on Billboard Top 200. The drummer for the diVINYLS sessions was Charley Drayton, who became romantically involved with Amphlett: they married in July 1999, and from 2000, lived together in New York. A disagreement with Virgin Records stifled future development outside Australia where they released popular albums and achieved two more top twenty singles with "I Ain't Gonna Eat Out My Heart Anymore" No. 19 in 1992 and "I'm Jealous" No. 14 in 1995. During the 1980s and 1990s Amphlett collaborated as a songwriter with other artists including Chrissie Hynde and Cyndi Lauper, and both Amphlett and McEntee worked on solo projects.In 1992 Amphlett sang lead vocals for Australian band Icehouse on a new version of their 1981 hit "Love in Motion".

A live album, Divinyls Live, was released in 1991 but Divinyls did not provide another studio album for five years. In the early 1990s, they recorded a series of cover songs for various movie soundtracks, including the Young Rascals' "I Ain't Gonna Eat Out My Heart Anymore" for Buffy the Vampire Slayer (1992), the Wild Ones' "Wild Thing" for Reckless Kelly (1993), and Roxy Music's "Love Is the Drug" for Super Mario Brothers (1993).

The song "I Touch Myself" caused such a controversy it had trouble getting airplay in many US-area markets; so much to the point that while performing their song live in Texas at Austin Aqua Fest 1991 the plug was pulled on the band mid-set by organisers.

It wasn't until 1996 that their fifth studio album, Underworld, was released in Australia by BMG. Despite the success of diVINYLS, Virgin had not kept them under contract and BMG did not release Underworld in the United States. As with What a Life!, they worked with three producers, beginning with Peter Collins recording "I'm Jealous" in Nashville, followed by Keith Forsey for "Sex Will Keep Us Together" and "Heart of Steel". Although "Heart of Steel" was chosen as a single, Divinyls discontinued working with Forsey because according to Amphlett "he was a bit too 'pop' for us" and remaining tracks were produced by their drummer Drayton. By the end of 1996, Amphlett and McEntee had a falling out and separated without formally disbanding Divinyls.

=== 1998–2005: After the separation ===
Following Underworld, Amphlett pursued a stage career. In 1998, she played the role of Judy Garland in the Australian stage production of the life story of entertainer Peter Allen, titled The Boy from Oz. The production was a success and Amphlett's interpretation of Garland, during her final troubled years, brought her critical acclaim: she was nominated for the Helpmann Award for 'Best Female Actor in a Musical'.

In May 2001, the Australasian Performing Right Association (APRA), as part of its 75th-anniversary celebrations, named "Science Fiction" as one of the Top 30 Australian songs of all time.

Amphlett and McEntee concentrated on solo projects and collaborations with other artists. Amphlett and Drayton lived in New York City from 2000, while McEntee ran a clothing label, Wheels and Doll Baby, in Perth with his partner, Melanie Greensmith. In November 2005 Amphlett published her autobiography Pleasure and Pain: My Life co-written with Larry Writer; she detailed her achievements, drug and alcohol abuse, love affairs and triumphs while a member of Divinyls.

=== 2006–2012: Hall of Fame and reformation ===
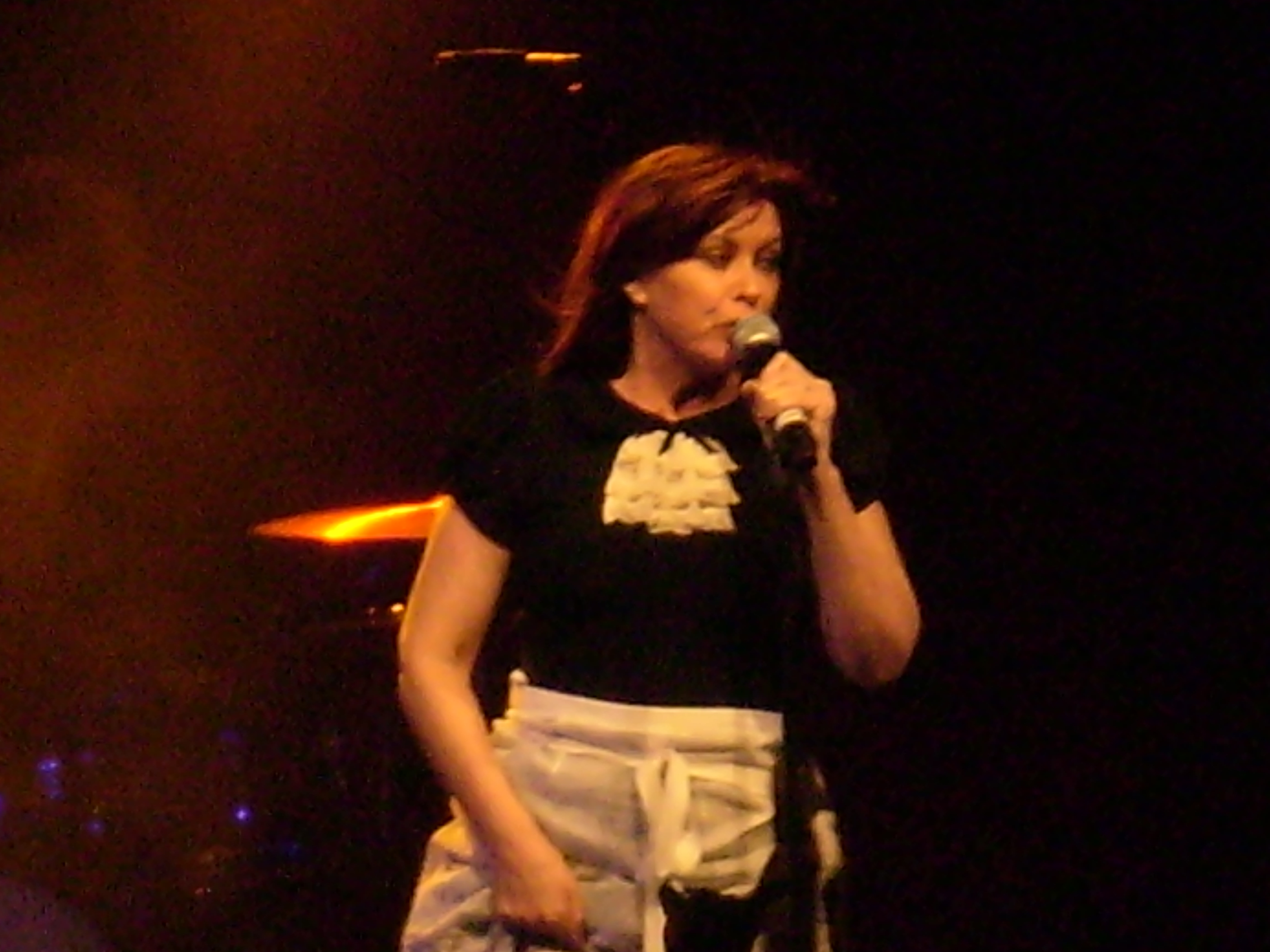
Chrissy Amphlett in 2007

On 16 August 2006, Divinyls were inducted into the ARIA Hall of Fame and made their first performance for 10 years at the award ceremony. They reformed shortly afterwards and a compilation, Greatest Hits, was released by EMI Music Australia in August 2006. The band recorded four new songs via a satellite link: Amphlett and Drayton at Palm Studios in Las Vegas and McEntee in Perth. A single and B-side, "Don't Wanna Do This"/"Asphyxiated", was released in November 2007, with a third track, "All Pretty Things", released on a compilation album for the Homebake Festival. Amphlett stated that the band would return to the studio to record a full album provided they "survived" their Homebake headline gig and national tour.

They performed during the Australian Idol grand final at the Sydney Opera House, on 25 November 2007, although their performance of "Boys in Town" (also performed by Idol winner Natalie Gauci) had to be repeated after Network Ten's transmission feed was interrupted. A national tour of Australia followed in December 2007 with a touring band featuring Drayton on drums, Jerome Smith on bass, Charlie Owen on guitar and newest member Clayton Doley on keyboards. Amphlett revealed on 7 December 2007 that she had multiple sclerosis in an interview with Richard Wilkins on Network Nine's A Current Affair—nevertheless, she was looking forward to touring with Divinyls. The next day, Divinyls headlined the Homebake music festival where Amphlett displayed an emotional fragility when attempting to get the crowd to sing along with her. In August 2009, Amphlett announced that Divinyls were finished and she had a new band in New York.

=== 2013–present: Death of Amphlett and aborted 2018 reformation ===
Aged 53 years, Amphlett died on 21 April 2013 at her home in New York City after a protracted battle with breast cancer since 2010. Amphlett stated that she had been unable to receive radiotherapy or chemotherapy as treatment for the cancer due to her multiple sclerosis. Amphlett's cousin Patricia Thompson announced the news in an official public statement: "Our beloved Chrissy peacefully made her transition this morning. Christine Joy Amphlett succumbed to the effects of breast cancer and multiple sclerosis, diseases she vigorously fought with exceptional bravery and dignity." In 2014, some of Australia's leading female artists came together to cover "I Touch Myself" to raise awareness and funds for breast cancer.

In 2017, the band performed a one-off show in Perth with The Preatures' Isabella Manfredi and Jack Moffit joining as guests on lead vocals and rhythm guitar, respectively. McEntee, Grossman and Harvey completed the line-up.

In December 2018, McEntee announced he would be reforming the group with new singer Lauren Ruth Ward, ex-Divinyls guitarist Frank Infante and a new rhythm section for an Australian tour, to begin in 2019. However, this announcement was criticised by Drayton and several fans as an "ultimate disrespect", with Drayton stating that anyone other than Amphlett who fronted the Divinyls should "seek some trustworthy advice". On 6 February 2019, the Australian tour was cancelled.

In early January 2021, former band drummer Warren McLean died. Original drummer Richard Harvey died on 19 July 2022, his passing announced on social media by his bandmate from The Party Boys Paul Christie.

== Band members ==
Final line-up

- Chrissy Amphlett – lead vocals (1980–1996, 2006–2009; died 2013)
- Mark McEntee – guitar, backing vocals, keyboards (1980–1996, 2006–2009)
- Jerome Smith – bass (1991–1996, 2006–2009)
- Charley Drayton – drums, percussion, backing vocals, occasional guitar, bass and harmonica (1990–1996, 2006–2009)
- Clayton Doley – keyboards, backing vocals (2006–2009)
- Charlie Owen – guitar (2006–2009; touring member in 1991)

Former members

- Jeremy Paul – bass (1980–1982)
- Richard Harvey – drums (1980—1985; died 2022)
- Bjarne Ohlin – keyboards, guitar, backing vocals (1980–1986)
- Rick Grossman – bass (1982–1987)
- J. J. Harris – drums (1985–1986)
- Kenny Lyon – keyboards (1987)
- Tommy "Mugs" Cain – drums (1987)
- Tim Millikan – bass (1988–1989)
- Warren McLean – drums (1988; died 2021)
- Roger Mason – keyboards (1988–1990)
- Tim Powles – drums (1989)
- Randy Jackson – bass (1990–1991)
- Benmont Tench – keyboards (1990–1991)

Touring/substitute musicians

- Ken Firth – bass guitar (1982)
- Matthew Hughes – keyboards, bass guitar (1987–1988)
- Frank Infante – guitar (1987)
- Jim Hilbun – bass (1991)
- Lee Borkman – keyboards, guitar (1991)
- Mark Meyer – drums (1991)
- Duane Jarvis – guitar (1988)
- Randy Wiggins – guitar (1993–1995)
- Scott Kingman – guitar (1996)

== Discography ==
Studio albums:

- 1982: Music from Monkey Grip
- 1983: Desperate
- 1985: What a Life!
- 1988: Temperamental
- 1991: Divinyls
- 1996: Underworld

== Awards and nominations ==
=== ARIA Music Awards ===
The ARIA Music Awards is an annual awards ceremony that recognises excellence, innovation, and achievement across all genres of Australian music. They commenced in 1987. Divinyls were inducted into the Hall of Fame in 2006.

Year	Nominee / work	Award	Result
1991	"I Touch Myself"	Single of the Year	Nominated
2006	Divinyls	ARIA Hall of Fame	inductee

=== Countdown Australian Music Awards ===
Countdown was an Australian pop music TV series on national broadcaster ABC-TV from 1974 to 1987, it presented music awards from 1979 to 1987, initially in conjunction with magazine TV Week. The TV Week / Countdown Awards were a combination of popular-voted and peer-voted awards.

Year	Nominee / work	Award	Result
1981	"Boys in Town"	Best Australian Single	Nominated
1981	"Boys in Town"	Best Debut Single	Nominated
1981	Themselves	Best New Talent	Nominated
1982	Monkey Grip	Best Debut Album	Nominated
1982	Chrissy Amphlett (Divinyls)	Most Popular Female	Won
1983	Desperate	Best Australian Album	Nominated
1984	Christina Amphlett – "In My Life" (Divinyls)	Best Female Performance in a Video	Nominated

=== MTV Video Music Awards ===
Originally beginning as an alternative to the Grammy Awards, the MTV Video Music Awards were established in the end of the summer of 1984 by MTV to celebrate the top music videos of the year.

Year	Nominee / work	Award	Result	Ref.
1991	"I Touch Myself"	Video of the Year	Nominated	
1991	"I Touch Myself"	Best Group Video	Nominated	
1991	"I Touch Myself"	Viewer's Choice	Nominated	

== See also ==
- Tony Mott
