= Mark McEntee =

Australian musician

- Born: 16 July 1955 (age 71); Perth, Western Australia, Australia
- Genres: Rock, new wave
- Instruments: Vocals, guitar, keyboards
- Years active: 1970s–present

Mark McEntee (/ˌmækənˈtiː/ MAK-ən-TEE; born 16 July 1955) is an Australian musician, best known as the lead guitarist and co-founder of the Australian rock band, Divinyls.

== Early life ==
McEntee was born in Perth, Western Australia, and went to Christ Church Grammar School.

== Mother Lode ==
During the early-1970s Mark (guitar and vocals) teamed up with Howard Shawcross (bass guitar and vocals), Peter Nelson (drums) and formed the band Mother Lode. The band released a single titled Music of Mother Lode featuring the tracks: "Smother Me" as the A side and "Flying" on the B side. Howard and Mark share writing credits on "Smother Me" while Mark has solo writing credit for "Flying". Pressed in Australia by the ASTOR Record Label (run off wax # MA-7143), it came in a paper sleeve with a full band credit description for both sides. Recorded at Armstrong Studios in Perth, Western Australia, this particular and important early career single was pressed in very limited quantities and little is known about the life span of the band or other particulars of the group's recording or gig history. Due to the diverse and localized music scenes in various Australian metro areas this single was more than likely only distributed in the Perth/Western Australia area.

== Air Supply ==
Prior to joining Divinyls, McEntee worked on the 1975 Australian production of Jesus Christ Superstar, where he met Russell Hitchcock and Graham Russell who were performing in the musical. Hitchcock and Russell went on to form soft rock group Air Supply, and McEntee was part of the group's original line-up, along with Chrissie Hammond and Jeremy Paul.

== Divinyls ==
McEntee was introduced to Chrissy Amphlett by Paul at a music venue in Collaroy, Sydney, Australia, with an intention to write songs and form a band that would be fronted by Amphlett. The three met again at a choral concert at the Sydney Opera House, where Amphlett and Paul were performing. In 1980, they formed the Divinyls, along with Bjarne Ohlin and drummer Richard Harvey. McEntee had played alongside Richard Harvey and Ian Belton in The Malcolm McCallum Band prior to forming Divinyls.

In May 2001, the Divinyls' song "Science Fiction", written by Amphlett and McEntee, was selected by Australasian Performing Right Association (APRA) as one of the Top 30 Australian songs of all time.

Amphlett and McEntee barely spoke after the band separated in 1996, but resumed contact when they were inducted into the 2006 ARIA Hall of Fame. The band performed at the induction ceremony, and eventually announced a new tour and album. The reunited band toured in late 2006 and released a new single called "Don't Wanna Do This".

In December 2018, McEntee announced the reformation of the Divinyls for an Australian tour to take place in early 2019, however the tour was cancelled several months later due to "unforeseen circumstances", with the promoter's spokesperson declining to comment if the reason was low ticket sales.

== Personal life ==
McEntee and Divinyls bandmate Chrissy Amphlett were romantically involved from 1982 to 1993. They had met in 1980, and began a relationship two years later when McEntee had split up with his first wife. Their relationship was highly volatile – marred with drug and alcohol use and physical fights. However, the band's manager, Vince Lovegrove, later stated that the nature of their "weird" relationship was the "magic of Divinyls".

As of 2013, McEntee lives on the outskirts of Perth with his partner, fashion designer Melanie Greensmith. The pair ran a clothing label, Wheels & Dollbaby, until Greensmith closed the business in 2017. McEntee also runs a small business called Macca's Vintage Aerodrome, that sells World War I and Pioneer radio-controlled aircraft.

== Causes ==
In 2012, McEntee and Greensmith were listed as supporters of the "Oscar's Law" campaign, together with other publicly known figures. The campaign protests against the factory farming of companion animals and is named after a neglected dog found in central Victoria, Australia. Other notable supporters include Lior (musician), Mick Molloy (comedian) and the Essendon Football Club (Australian Football League).
