= Chrissy Amphlett =

Australian singer and actress (1959–2013)

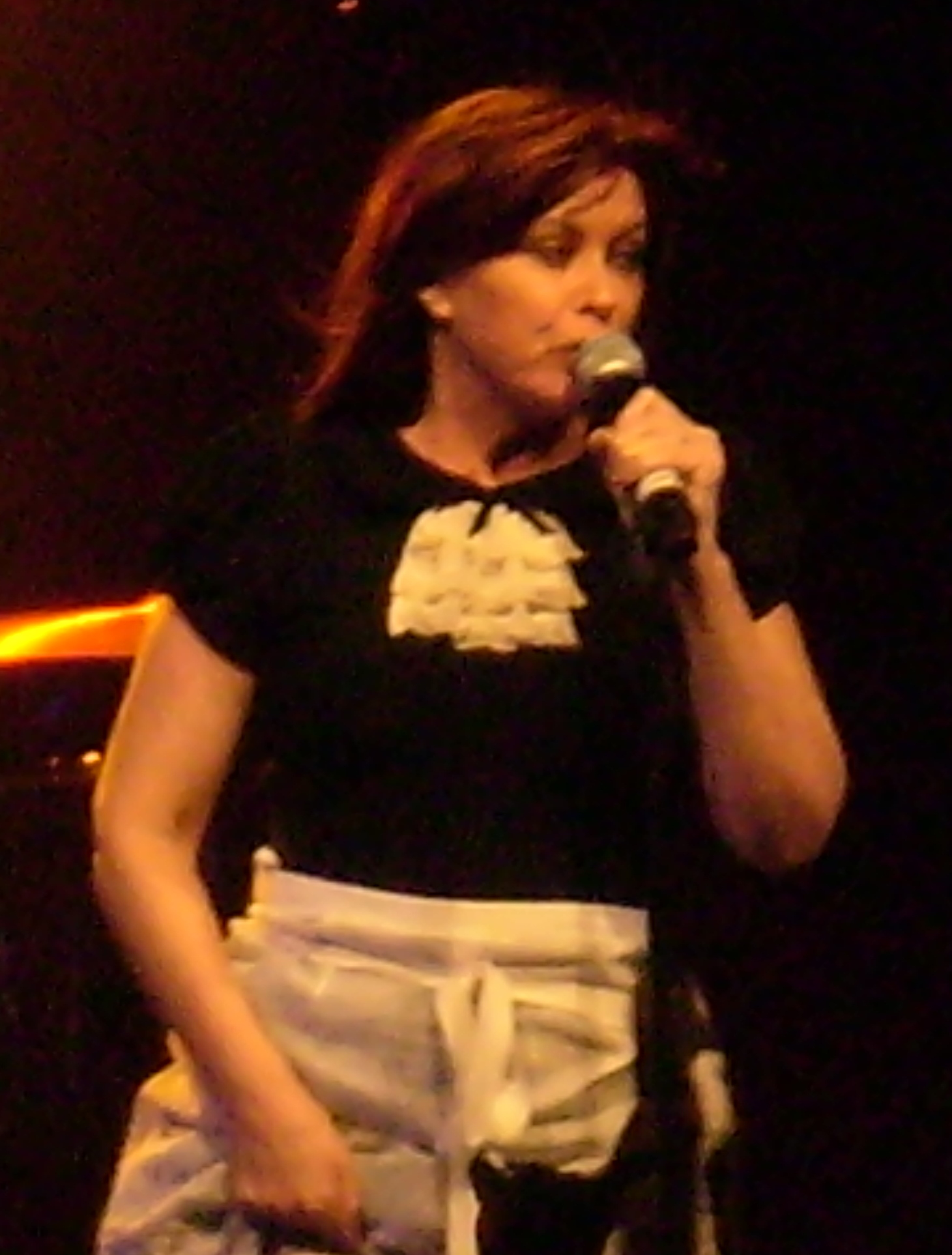
- Amphlett performing in 2007

Background information
- Born: Christine Joy Amphlett; 25 October 1959; Geelong, Victoria, Australia
- Died: 21 April 2013 (aged 53) New York City, US
- Genres: Rock, new wave
- Occupations: Singer, songwriter, actress
- Years active: 1980–2011
- Labels: Chrysalis, Virgin, RCA
- Formerly of: Divinyls, The Tulips

Christine Joy Amphlett (/æmflət/; 25 October 1959 – 21 April 2013) was an Australian singer, songwriter and actress, best known as the frontwoman of the rock band Divinyls. She was notable for her brash, overtly sexual persona and subversive humour in lyrics, performances and media interviews.

Amphlett, Jeremy Paul and guitarist Mark McEntee formed Divinyls in Sydney in 1980. With Amphlett and McEntee as its core members, the band underwent various lineup changes before dissolving in 1996. The band's biggest-selling single, "I Touch Myself" (1990), was a No. 1 hit in Australia, a No. 4 hit in the United States, and a No. 10 hit in the United Kingdom (UK). The band was inducted into the Australian Recording Industry Association (ARIA) Hall of Fame in 2006.

On the stage, Amphlett played Linda Lips in the R-rated adults-only musical comedy Let My People Come (1976), starred in the musical Blood Brothers (1988), and portrayed Judy Garland in multiple productions of The Boy from Oz. On the screen, she played a supporting role in Monkey Grip (1982).

== Early life and education ==
Christine Joy Amphlett was born on 25 October 1959 in Geelong, Victoria. Her mother Mary was from a well-off Hawthorn family, while her father Jim was a World War II veteran whose mother was a German immigrant and his father a Melbourne chef. Amphlett was a first cousin of Australian singer Little Pattie (Patricia Amphlett).

She worked as a child model from the age of three until 12, and later said, "I didn't come from a very wealthy family so that actually clothed me and allowed me to have things". Amphlett attended Belmont High School.

== Music ==
=== Divinyls ===
Amphlett met Mark McEntee at a concert at the Sydney Opera House in 1980 and they formed Divinyls with Jeremy Paul (Air Supply). Having performed in Sydney for some time, they recorded several songs for the film Monkey Grip, in which Amphlett also acted.

Divinyls consisted of an ever-changing line-up formed around Amphlett and McEntee, whose relationship was always volatile. Nevertheless, the band released six albums between 1982 and 1996, peaking in 1991 with the success of their single "I Touch Myself", which reached #1 in Australia, #4 in the US and #10 in the UK. The band, which underwent various lineup changes, broke up in 1996.

The band was inducted into the Australian Recording Industry Association (ARIA) Hall of Fame in 2006.

Amphlett and McEntee barely spoke after the band broke up, but resumed contact when they were inducted into the ARIA Hall of Fame and eventually announced a new tour and album. The band recorded and released a single, "Don't Wanna Do This", and toured Australia, but the proposed reunion album was never made.

=== Other work ===
In 1992 Australian band Icehouse released a new version of their 1981 hit "Love in Motion" with Amphlett taking lead vocals supported by Iva Davies. The song's related music video features Amphlett prominently. The 1992 version appears on the Icehouse compilation album Masterfile, and a long remix titled "Slow Motion" was included on the 1994 Icehouse remix album Full Circle.

Amphlett performed Divinyls' and other songs with a 30-piece orchestra for the Australian Rock Symphony in January 2010.

In 2011, she released the single "Summer Song" under the name The Tulips, a band consisting of Amphlett, Charley Drayton and Kraig Jarret Johnson. It was used in the soundtrack for the film The Music Never Stopped.

=== Posthumous release ===
In 2026, it was reported that three songs Amphlett recorded with New Zealand singer Tim Finn will be released on 2 October of that year as an EP titled Some Times. Amphlett made the recordings with Finn in 1998, after Finn saw Amphlett perform in The Boy from Oz. The two created and recorded the three songs within the span of a few days, but plans for a demo never happened, and the two never met again. Finn thought the recordings were lost after he moved home three times, but found them in his garage in 2023.

=== Image ===
Known for her brash, sexualised persona, Amphlett employed subversive humour in performances, lyrics and media interviews.

== Acting ==
At the age of 17 in 1976, Amphlett was part of the original cast of the Australian production of the Earl Wilson Jr. penned stage musical comedy Let My People Come, playing the role of Linda Lips. The adult-themed musical opened at the Total Theatre in Melbourne, running for nine months, before transferring to the Bijou Theatre in Sydney for an additional three months. Amphlett made her film debut in Monkey Grip (1982) in a supporting role as Angela, the temperamental lead singer of a rock band.

In 1988, she starred opposite Russell Crowe in the first Australian production of Willy Russell's stage musical Blood Brothers.

Amphlett played Judy Garland in the original touring production of The Boy from Oz, with Todd McKenney playing the role of Peter Allen. When the highly successful show transferred to Broadway in the year 2000, Garland was played by American performer Isabel Keating and Allen by Hugh Jackman. On its return to Australia as an arena spectacular, Amphlett resumed playing the role.

== Personal life ==
Amphlett and her bandmate Mark McEntee were romantically involved from 1982 to 1993. They met in 1980 and began a relationship two years later when McEntee split up with his wife. Their relationship was highly volatile, marred by drug and alcohol use and physical fights. However, the band's manager, Vince Lovegrove, later stated that the nature of their "weird" relationship was the "magic of Divinyls".

On 27 July 1999, Amphlett married American drummer Charley Drayton, who played drums on the Divinyls' eponymous album and was the drummer in the reformed group.

In an interview on the Nine Network program A Current Affair, on 7 December 2007, Amphlett revealed that she had multiple sclerosis. On 20 October 2010, she announced that she had breast cancer and was being treated in New York, where she lived with her husband. She also said that her sister was a breast cancer survivor. On 24 January 2011, she stated she was free of cancer.

=== Death and legacy ===
Amphlett died, aged 53, on 21 April 2013, at her home in Manhattan after being diagnosed with breast cancer in 2010. Because she also had multiple sclerosis, she reported that she was unable to receive radiation treatment or chemotherapy to treat the cancer. Following the announcement of Amphlett's death, numerous tributes were received from artists, performers, and musicians. Russell Crowe wrote: "RIP Chrissie Amphlett, [she] played my mum in Blood Brothers, 1988."

A Melbourne central city laneway has been named "Amphlett Lane" in Amphlett's honour, complete with a commemorative plaque and two artworks. In November 2018, Amphlett was posthumously inducted into the Music Victoria Hall of Fame.

==== I Touch Myself Project ====
Amphlett's family and friends and Cancer Council NSW launched the breast cancer awareness project "I Touch Myself" in 2014, as a tribute to Amphlett. Part of the project included a cover of "I Touch Myself" and features 10 female Australian artists (Olivia Newton-John, Megan Washington, Sarah McLeod, Katie Noonan, Sarah Blasko, Suze DeMarchi, Deborah Conway, Kate Ceberano, Little Pattie and Connie Mitchell). The song was released in June 2014 and peaked at number 72 on the ARIA charts.

Cancer Council NSW stated, "Through this campaign we are encouraging women to get to know their breasts better, to know what is normal for them and to participate in breast screening if they're in the right age range."

== Discography ==
=== Extended plays ===
List of EPs, with selected details
| Title | Details |
|---|---|
| Some Times | Released: 2 October 2026; Label: Periscope, ORiGiN; Format: digital |

== Awards ==
=== ARIA Music Awards ===
The ARIA Music Awards is an annual awards ceremony that recognises excellence, innovation and achievement across all genres of Australian music. They commenced in 1987. Divinyls were inducted into the Hall of Fame in 2006.

| Year | Nominee / work | Award | Result |
|---|---|---|---|
| ARIA Music Awards of 2006 | Divinyls (Chrissy Amphlett) | ARIA Hall of Fame | inductee |

=== Countdown Australian Music Awards ===
Countdown was an Australian pop music TV series on national broadcaster ABC-TV from 1974 to 1987, it presented music awards from 1979 to 1987, initially in conjunction with magazine TV Week. The TV Week / Countdown Awards were a combination of popular-voted and peer-voted awards.

| Year | Nominee / work | Award | Result |
|---|---|---|---|
| 1982 | Chrissy Amphlett (Divinyls) | Most Popular Female | Won |
| 1984 | Christina Amphlett – "In My Life" (Divinyls) | Best Female Performance in a Video | Nominated |

=== Helpmann Awards ===
The Helpmann Awards is an awards show, celebrating live entertainment and performing arts in Australia, presented by industry group Live Performance Australia since 2001. Note: 2020 and 2021 were cancelled due to the COVID-19 pandemic.

| Year | Nominee / work | Award | Result | Ref. |
|---|---|---|---|---|
| 2001 | Chrissy Amphlett – The Boy from Oz | Helpmann Award for Best Female Actor in a Musical | Nominated | |

=== Mo Awards ===
The Australian Entertainment Mo Awards (commonly known informally as the Mo Awards), were annual Australian entertainment industry awards. They recognise achievements in live entertainment in Australia from 1975 to 2016.

| Year | Nominee / work | Award | Result (wins only) |
|---|---|---|---|
| 2000 | Chrissy Amphlett | Supporting Musical Theatrical Performer of the Year | Won |

=== Music Victoria Awards ===
The Music Victoria Awards are an annual awards night celebrating Victorian music. They commenced in 2005.

| Year | Nominee / work | Award | Result |
|---|---|---|---|
| 2018 | Chrissy Amphlett | Hall of Fame | inductee |
