= Pennsylvania Railroad 4877 =

Preserved PRR GG1 electric locomotive

Coordinates: 40°38′13.7″N 74°50′12.1″W

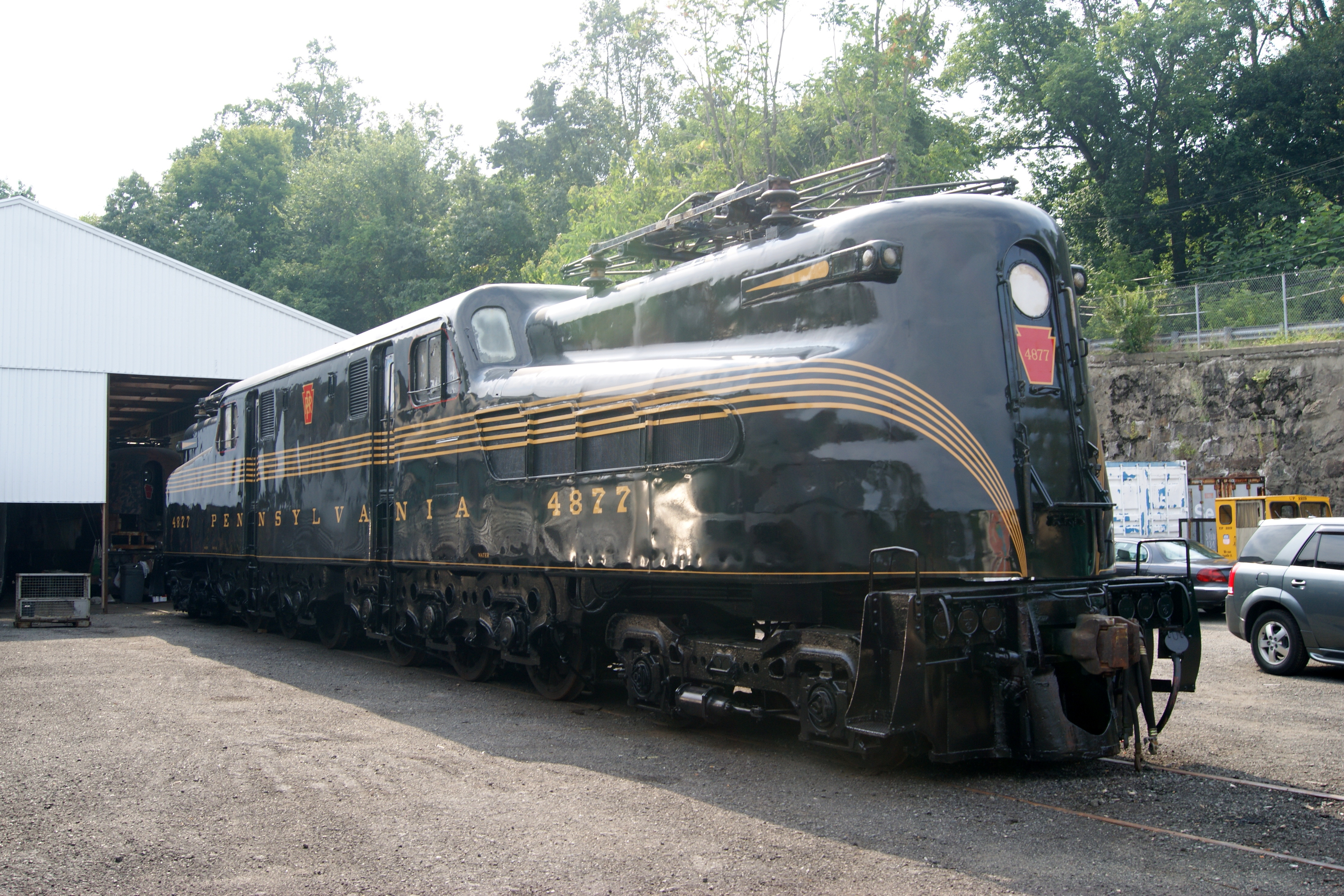
- 4877 in its fully restored appearance in the URHS restoration yard in Boonton, New Jersey
Type and origin
- Power type: Electric
- Builder: Altoona Works
- Serial number: 4346
- Build date: January 1939
Specifications
- Configuration
  - AAR: 2-C+C-2
- Gauge: 4 ft 8 1/2 in (1,435 mm)
- Driver dia.: 4 ft 9 in (1,448 mm)
- Length: 79 ft 6 in (24.23 m)
- Width: 10 ft 4 in (3.15 m)
- Height: 15 ft 0 in (4.57 m) over locked-down pantographs
- Loco weight: 477,000 lb (216,000 kg)
- Electric system/s: 11,000 V AC, 25 Hz
- Current pickup: Overhead AC with dual pantographs
Performance figures
- Maximum speed: 100 mph (160 km/h) (passenger); 90 mph (140 km/h) (freight)
- Power output: 4,620 hp (3,450 kW)
Career
- Operators: Pennsylvania Railroad, Penn Central, Conrail, Amtrak, New Jersey Transit
- Class: GG1
- Nicknames: Ol' Big Red
- Retired: October 29, 1983
- Current owner: United Railroad Historical Society of New Jersey
- Disposition: On static display

Pennsylvania Railroad 4877, formerly nicknamed "Big Red", is a GG1-class electric locomotive owned by the United Railroad Historical Society of New Jersey. It is stored at Boonton Yard in Boonton, New Jersey, United States. It is fully cosmetically restored to its original appearance.

== Background ==
The GG1 was developed in 1930s by General Electric as the replacement for the Pennsylvania Railroad's then standard electric locomotive, the P5a, and was based largely on the New Haven EP3. The GG1 was capable of a top speed of 100 miles per hour (160 km/h), powered by its twelve 385 horsepower (287 kW) traction motors. The prototype GG1, PRR 4800, was tested against Westinghouse's submission, the R1. The Pennsylvania selected the GG1 over the R1, as the R1 was not articulated and the GG1's traction motors were similar to ones already in use. An order for 57 GG1s was placed in November 1934 and the first locomotives were delivered in April 1935.

Raymond Loewy was hired by the Pennsylvania to "enhance the GG1's aesthetics." Loewy had the production locomotives' bodies be welded together, instead of riveted the way 4800 was, to give the GG1 a more streamlined appearance. Loewy also formulated the Brunswick green paint scheme and the gold pinstripes, nicknamed "cat's whiskers", which was eventually applied by the Pennsylvania to all of its locomotives for the next 20 years. In 1952, the Pennsylvania repainted some of its fleet of GG1s to a Tuscan red paint scheme with pinstripes.

== History ==
4877 was built in January 1939 at the Pennsylvania Railroad's Altoona Works in Altoona, Pennsylvania. 4877 was transferred to Penn Central when the Pennsylvania was merged with the New York Central Railroad in 1968. It was transferred again, to Conrail in 1976, when Penn Central went bankrupt. Thirteen GG1s were loaned to the New Jersey Department of Transportation in the 1980s, for use in what would eventually become New Jersey Transit, on its North Jersey Coast Line. 4877 was repainted from the solid black paint scheme used by both Penn Central and Conrail back into Pennsylvania Railroad Tuscan red in 1981.

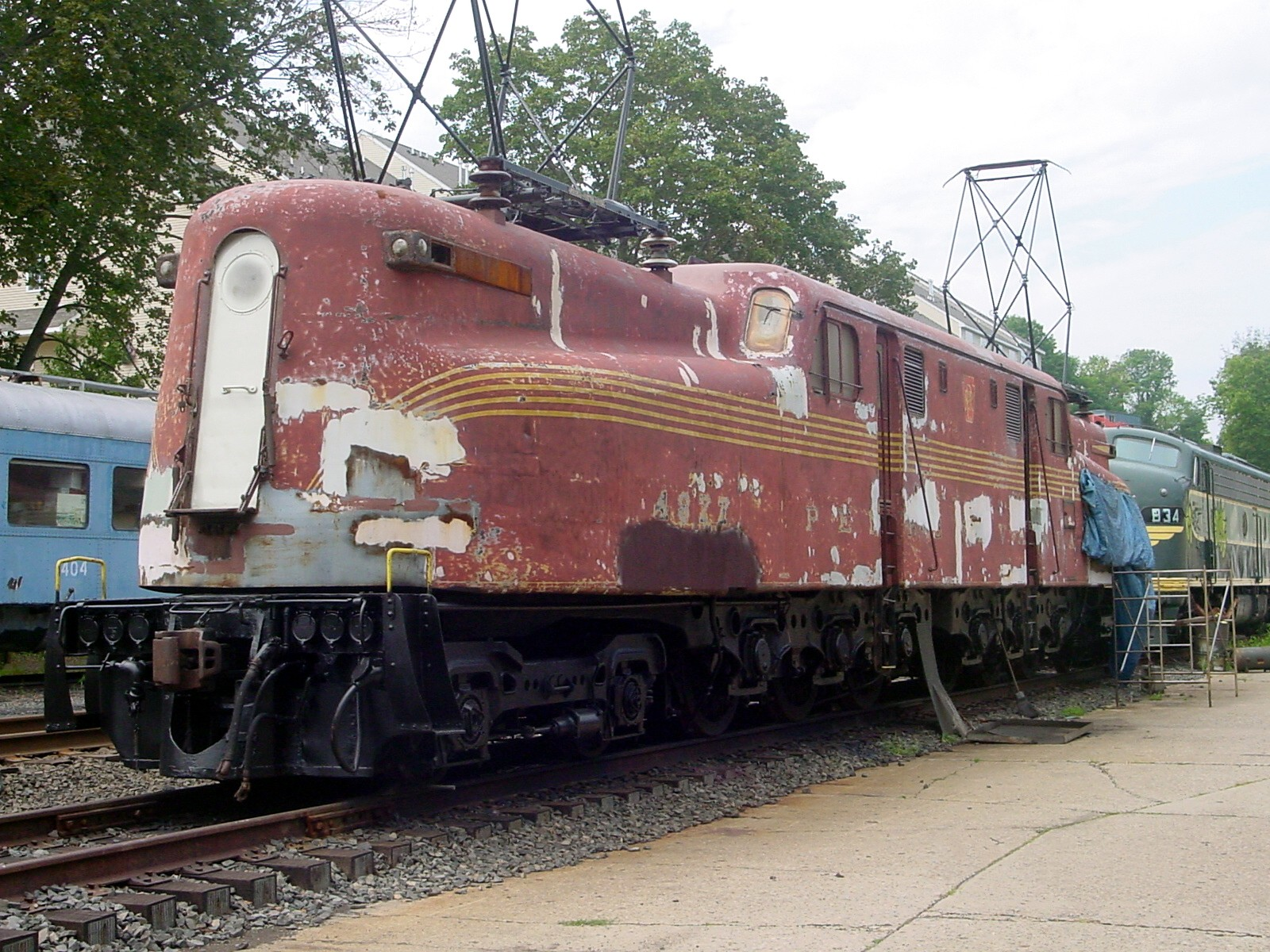
Locomotive before restoration

In anticipation of the GG1s' final retirement on October 29, 1983, a documentary was made earlier that year about the final operations of NJT's GG1 fleet, focusing on "Ol' Big Red" 4877 - also the title of a song written by GG1 engineer Cliff Underwood, who was also featured. Clips from the song are played at intervals throughout the film. The documentary depicted the engine change at South Amboy, New Jersey, and features many on-board views; the film was released a year later.

The locomotive was donated by New Jersey Transit to the United Railroad Historical Society of New Jersey (URHS) in 1991. Between 2011 and 2013, the locomotive was cosmetically restored by the URHS in-house contractor Star Trak, Inc. It was given its original Brunswick Green paint scheme and was once again displayed to the public at the URHS open house in September 2012. Currently, 4877 calls Boonton Yard home where it is visible from the street, but not regularly accessible by the public. It is part of a large collection of equipment which will be a part of the future New Jersey Transportation Heritage Center.

== Sources ==
- Bezilla, Michael (1980). Electric Traction on the Pennsylvania Railroad, 1895–1968. University Park: Penn State University Press. ISBN 978-0271002415. OCLC 5336721.
- Schafer, Mike; Soloman, Brian (1997). Pennsylvania Railroad. Osceola, WI: MBI Publishing. ISBN 0-7603-0379-7.
