= Sam Sebo =

American football player (1906–1933)

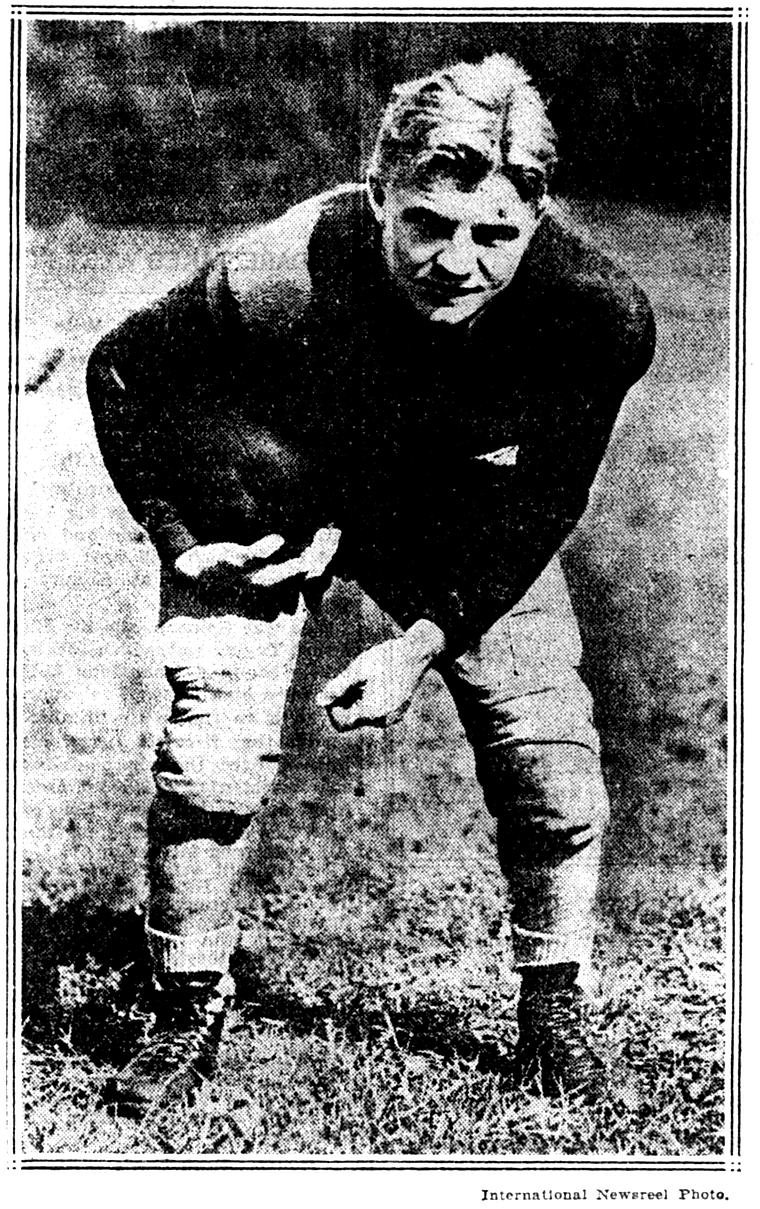

No. 28
- Position: Fullback

Personal information
- Born: 1906
- Died: December 11, 1933 (aged 26–27); Little Valley, New York, U.S.
- Listed height: 5 ft 7 in (1.70 m)
- Listed weight: 165 lb (75 kg)

Career information
- High school: Garfield (Garfield, New Jersey)
- College: Syracuse (1926–1929)

Career history
- Newark Tornadoes (1930)
- Stats at Pro Football Reference

Samuel E. Sebo (1906 – December 11, 1933), also known as Samuel Dzikowski, was an American professional football fullback who played one season with the Newark Tornadoes of the National Football League (NFL). He played college football at Syracuse University.

== Early life and college ==
Samuel E. Sebo was born in 1906. He attended Garfield High School in Garfield, New Jersey. In 1925, he was accused of having forfeited his amateur status by playing semi-professional basketball. However, no wrongdoing was ever proven.

Sebo was a member of the Syracuse Orange of Syracuse University from 1926 to 1929 and a three-year letterman from 1927 to 1929.

== Professional career ==
Sebo signed with the Newark Tornadoes of the National Football League in 1930. He played in two games, starting one, for the Tornadoes during the 1930 season. He wore jersey number 28 while with the Tornadoes. Sebo stood 5'7" and weighed 165 pounds.

== Personal life ==
Sebo died of a heart attack on December 11, 1933, in Little Valley, New York. He had been sick since 1931. More than 500 people attended his funeral.
