= New York and Greenwood Lake Railway =

New York and Greenwood Lake Railway may refer to:

- New York and Greenwood Lake Railway (1878–1943), a predecessor of the Erie Railroad in New Jersey
- New York and Greenwood Lake Railway (1996), an unrelated shortline railroad in Garfield and Passaic, New Jersey
