= Luis Castillo (American football) =

American football player (born 1983)

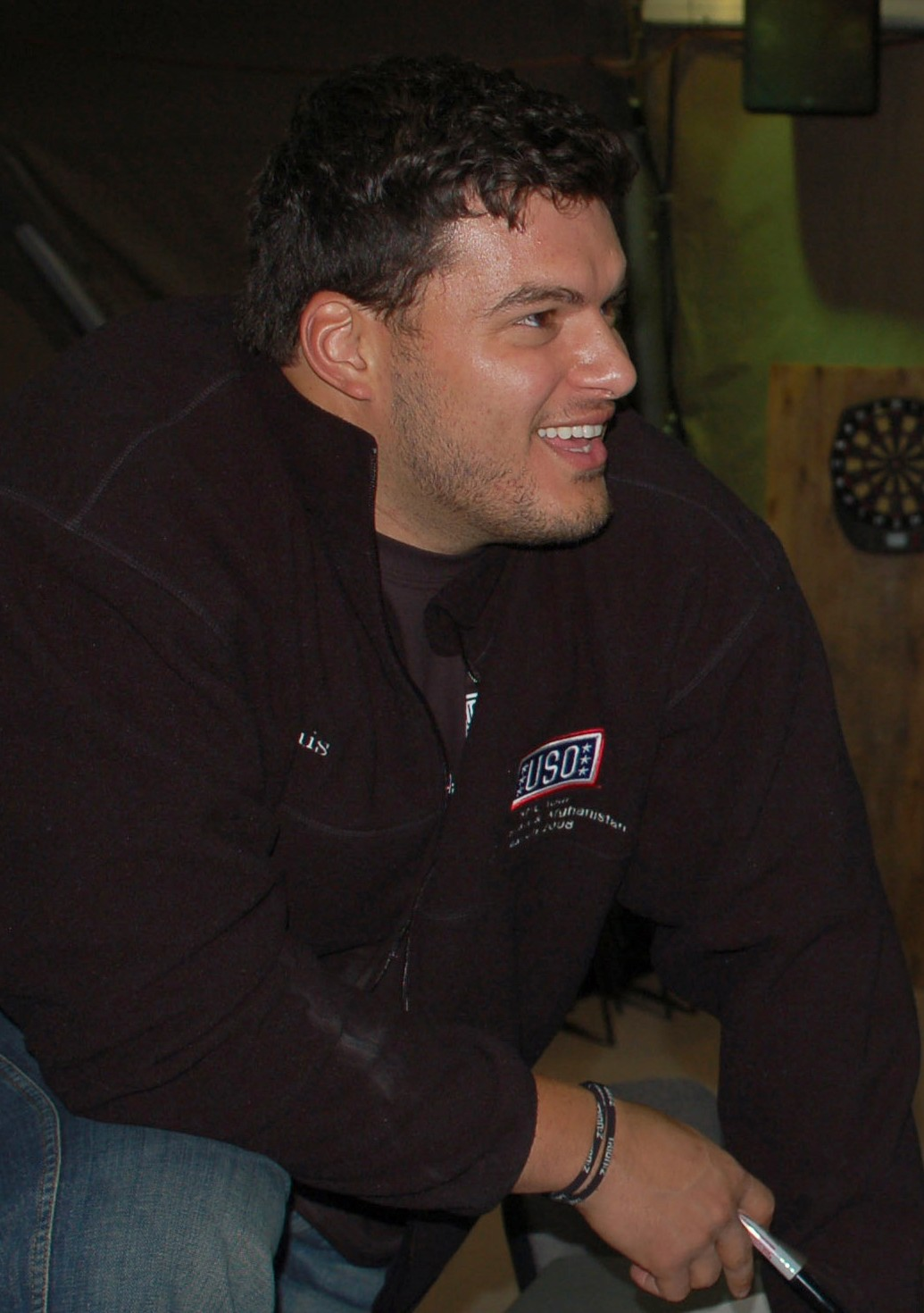
- Castillo in 2008

No. 93
- Position: Defensive end

Personal information
- Born: August 4, 1983 (age 43); Brooklyn, New York, U.S.
- Listed height: 6 ft 3 in (1.91 m)
- Listed weight: 290 lb (132 kg)

Career information
- High school: Garfield (NJ)
- College: Northwestern (2001–2004)
- NFL draft: 2005: 1st round, 28th overall pick

Career history
- San Diego Chargers (2005–2011)

Awards and highlights
- Second-team All-Big Ten (2004)

Career NFL statistics
- Total tackles: 210
- Sacks: 19
- Forced fumbles: 2
- Fumble recoveries: 2
- Interceptions: 2
- Stats at Pro Football Reference

Luis Alberto Castillo (born August 4, 1983) is an American former professional football player who was a defensive end for the San Diego Chargers of the National Football League (NFL). He played college football for the Northwestern Wildcats before being selected by the Chargers in the first round of the 2005 NFL draft. Castillo was one of the cover athletes for the Spanish language version of Madden NFL 08. Castillo was also the first NFL player drafted of Dominican Heritage.

== Early life ==
He was born on August 4, 1983, in Brooklyn, New York. He attended Garfield High School in Garfield, New Jersey, where he was team captain and team MVP of the football team, under coach Steven Mucha.

== College career ==
He attended Northwestern University, where he lived in Elder Hall for his freshman year. He was a 2004 Pro Football Weekly All-American selection, a Second-team All-Big Ten, Academic All-American by ESPN and Second-team Academic All-Big Ten. In 2003, he was a First-team Academic All-District and Academic All-Big Ten. Again, a Second-team Academic All-District by CoSIDA and Academic All-Big Ten in 2002. Castillo finished career with 251 tackles, 4.5 sacks, and 19.5 tackles for loss.

== Professional career ==
Pre-draft measurables
Height	Weight	Arm length	Hand span	40-yard dash	10-yard split	20-yard split	20-yard shuttle	Vertical jump	Broad jump	Bench press
6 ft 3 3/8 in (1.91 m)	303 lb (137 kg)	32 1/4 in (0.82 m)	10 1/8 in (0.26 m)	4.85 s	1.69 s	2.82 s	4.24 s	34.5 in (0.88 m)	9 ft 4 in (2.84 m)	32 reps
All values from NFL Combine/Pro Day

=== Positive drug test ===
Castillo made headlines at the 2005 NFL Combine when he sent a letter to all 32 NFL teams admitting to using androstenedione, a steroid hormone which increased the amount of testosterone his body produced, promoting muscle growth and healing in an effort to quicken the rehab process of a slow-healing injury so he could perform in all the drills at the 2005 NFL Combine. He claimed he used the steroids in an attempt to fully recover from an elbow injury suffered in the very first game of his senior year at Northwestern. Castillo hyper-extended his elbow, damaging the ulnar collateral ligament, basically preventing him from using one of his arms. Being the team captain, he felt an obligation to fight through the pain and finish the year.

In an interview with Peter King, Castillo said:

"So I got shot up before games and just endured the pain,["] Castillo told me. "There were a lot of tough moments. The pain was unbelievable. I had the option of taking a medical redshirt after our third game. I could have come back for a fifth year if I stopped playing then. I could have had surgery, and either come back next year and play again, or maybe make it back in time to work out and get ready for the NFL Draft. But I decided to keep playing. I basically played with one arm. My get-off ability was down. I was falling a lot. I wasn't anywhere near the player I could have been, but I played. At the end of the year, I expected I would have surgery and then come back in six or eight months, but then I saw the Bears' team doctor, and he told me that a lot of football players come back from this injury without having the surgery. So I just started rehabbing and thought I'd be ready for the Combine."

After the urine test came back positive, he and his agent wrote the letters to all the teams admitting use of an illegal substance. Despite this, San Diego Chargers Executive Vice President and General Manager A. J. Smith took a chance on Castillo because of his stellar track record at Northwestern. When asked about Castillo's steroid use, AJ responded, "Let me tell you -- this is a great kid. Did he cheat to try to get ready for the Combine? All of that is true. He has admitted it. He cheated to cut a corner because he was fearful. But I don't believe he gained an advantage [over what he would have been had he not been hurt]. If we wouldn't have picked him, someone else would have -- because he's proven what a good kid he is and this was a one-time mistake."

=== San Diego Chargers ===
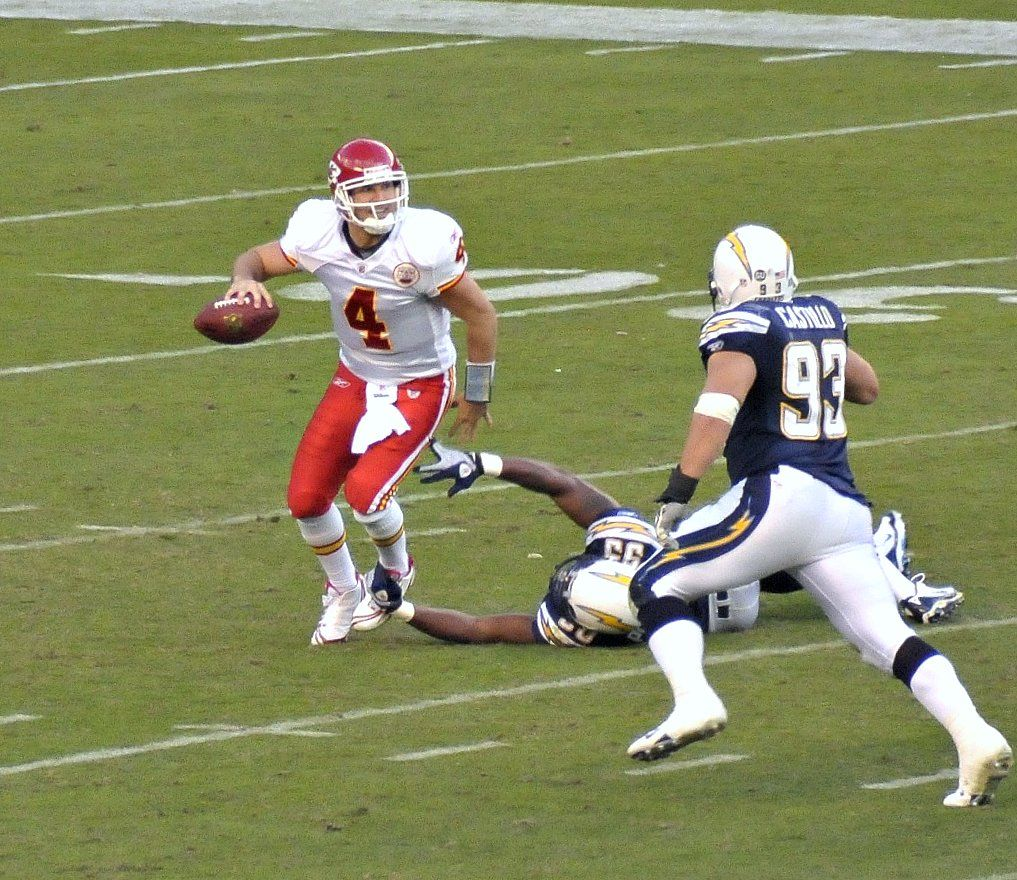
Castillo chases Chiefs QB Tyler Thigpen.

Castillo was selected with the 28th overall pick in the first round of the 2005 NFL draft.

In 2005 Castillo was named an All-Rookie Team selection by NFL.com, Pro Football Weekly/Professional Football Writers of America. Castillo has emerged as a play maker alongside Jamal Williams and Igor Olshansky, creating havoc in opposing backfields. He ended his rookie season with 49 tackles, 3½ sacks, and 3 pass deflections.

In the 2006 opening game at the Oakland Raiders ESPN commentator Dick Vermeil called Castillo one of the best young defensive linemen he's seen in a long time. Castillo was a second alternate to the 2006 Pro Bowl. His season totals included playing in 10 games (9 starts) 37 tackles, 7 sacks, and an interception.

On November 6, 2007, it was announced that Castillo would miss at least 6 weeks after having surgery on one of his knees. For the 2007 season he again played in 10 games and started nine. He totaled 33 tackles, 2½ sacks and one deflected pass. In 2008, following a tackle of Vince Young, Castillo performed a salsa dance for the crowd. Castillo started in all three playoff appearances for the Chargers, including the AFC Championship against the New England Patriots where he sacked Tom Brady.

Castillo signed a five-year, $43.1 million extension in July 2008. His statistics for the season were 16 games played, 15 starts, 39 tackles, 1½ sacks, a pass defensed and an interception (the second of his career).

In 2009, Castillo started and played 14 games with 2 sacks and 25 total tackles. He led the Chargers into the postseason until losing the divisional round to the New York Jets.

Castillo started all 16 games in 2010 with 2.5 sacks and 26 total tackles.

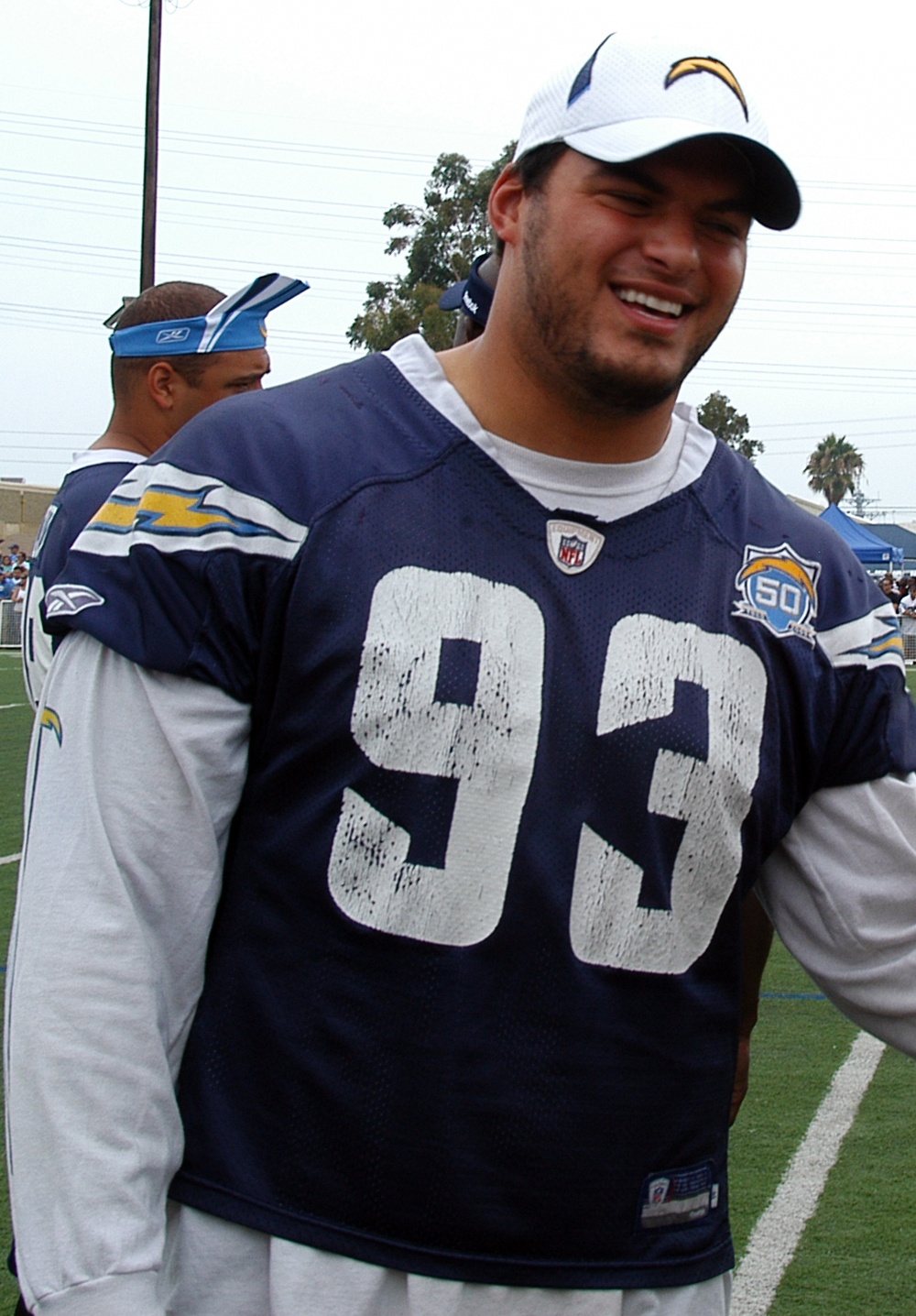
Castillo in 2009

During Week 1 of the 2011 season, he suffered a broken leg and it prematurely ended his 2011 season. He became a free agent after the season in which he played in only one game.

After visiting the New England Patriots, he re-signed with the Chargers on a 1-year deal on April 4, 2012.

However, Castillo was released by the Chargers on July 19, 2012.

=== NFL statistics ===
Years	Team	GP	COMB	TOTAL	AST	SACK	FF	FR	FR YDS	INT	IR YDS	AVG IR	LNG IR	TD	PD
2005	SD	16	49	37	12	3.5	1	0	0	0	0	0	0	0	3
2006	SD	10	37	28	9	7.0	0	1	0	1	1	1	1	0	1
2007	SD	10	33	23	10	2.5	0	0	0	0	0	0	0	0	1
2008	SD	15	39	27	12	1.5	1	0	0	1	4	4	4	0	1
2009	SD	14	25	17	8	2.0	0	0	0	0	0	0	0	0	0
2010	SD	16	26	18	8	2.5	0	1	10	0	0	0	0	0	0
2011	SD	1	1	1	0	0.0	0	0	0	0	0	0	0	0	0
Career		82	210	151	59	19.0	2	2	0	2	5	3	4	0	6

== Personal life ==
Castillo is fluent in Spanish. He was born in Brooklyn, New York and moved to the Dominican Republic with his mother, Maria, when he was a child. They returned to the United States when he was 5, and the family settled in New Jersey. Luis returns to the Dominican Republic every offseason where he is revered as a national icon. During his trips to the Dominican Republic, Castillo hosts a youth football clinic and does many community appearances. In 2005, he was honored with the Youth of the Year Award for excellence outside of the Dominican Republic.

Castillo has also emerged as a community leader in San Diego. In December 2007, he hosted "Shop with a Charger" for abused and neglected children, some of whom were homeless as well. Each child who participated in the event enjoyed dinner with Luis and his teammates and received a holiday gift card from Walmart.
