= Garfield Groundwater Contamination Superfund site =

Contamination site in New Jersey

Coordinates: 40.8725°N 74.1027°W

The Garfield Groundwater Contamination site is a Superfund site located in Garfield, New Jersey. The site was formally occupied by E.C Electroplating, an electroplating company that used chromic acid solution in their products. In 1983, a tank at the E.C Electroplating property malfunctioned and spilled chromic acid into the groundwater underneath the property that subsequently spread to the surrounding area. The contamination presented a health risk to Garfield residents in the area due to exposure to hexavalent chromium, a toxic form of chromium. The site was designated a Super fund site in 2011. Clean-up of the site is ongoing as of 2022.

== Origins ==
The Garfield Groundwater Contamination site is located in the city of Garfield, within Bergen County, New Jersey. E.C Electroplating, an electroplating company located in Garfield, contaminated their property and local groundwater after a chromium spill in 1983.

=== Town history ===
Garfield is located in Bergen County with a population of 32,655 as of the 2020 United States census. Originally home to the Lenape people, it was settled by Europeans dating back to 1679. Garfield was first developed in 1873, before becoming a borough in 1898, and then a city in 1917.

=== Company history ===
E.C Electroplating was an electroplating company with a chemical plant located at 125 Clark Street in Garfield, spanning approximately 3/4 of an acre. The company was a family owned business that operated since the late 1930s until 2009. In December 1983, a partially below-ground storage tank holding approximately 3,640 gallons of chromic acid plating solution containing approximately 5,400 pounds of chromium failed, leaking the solution directly into the groundwater underneath.

== Super fund designation ==
The New Jersey Department of Environmental Protection (NJDEP) first intervened to oversee the clean-up, but requested the United States Environmental Protection Agency (EPA) to investigate in 2002. In September 2011, the site of the E.C Electroplating facility and the surrounding contaminated area were added to the National Priorities List (NPL).

=== State intervention ===
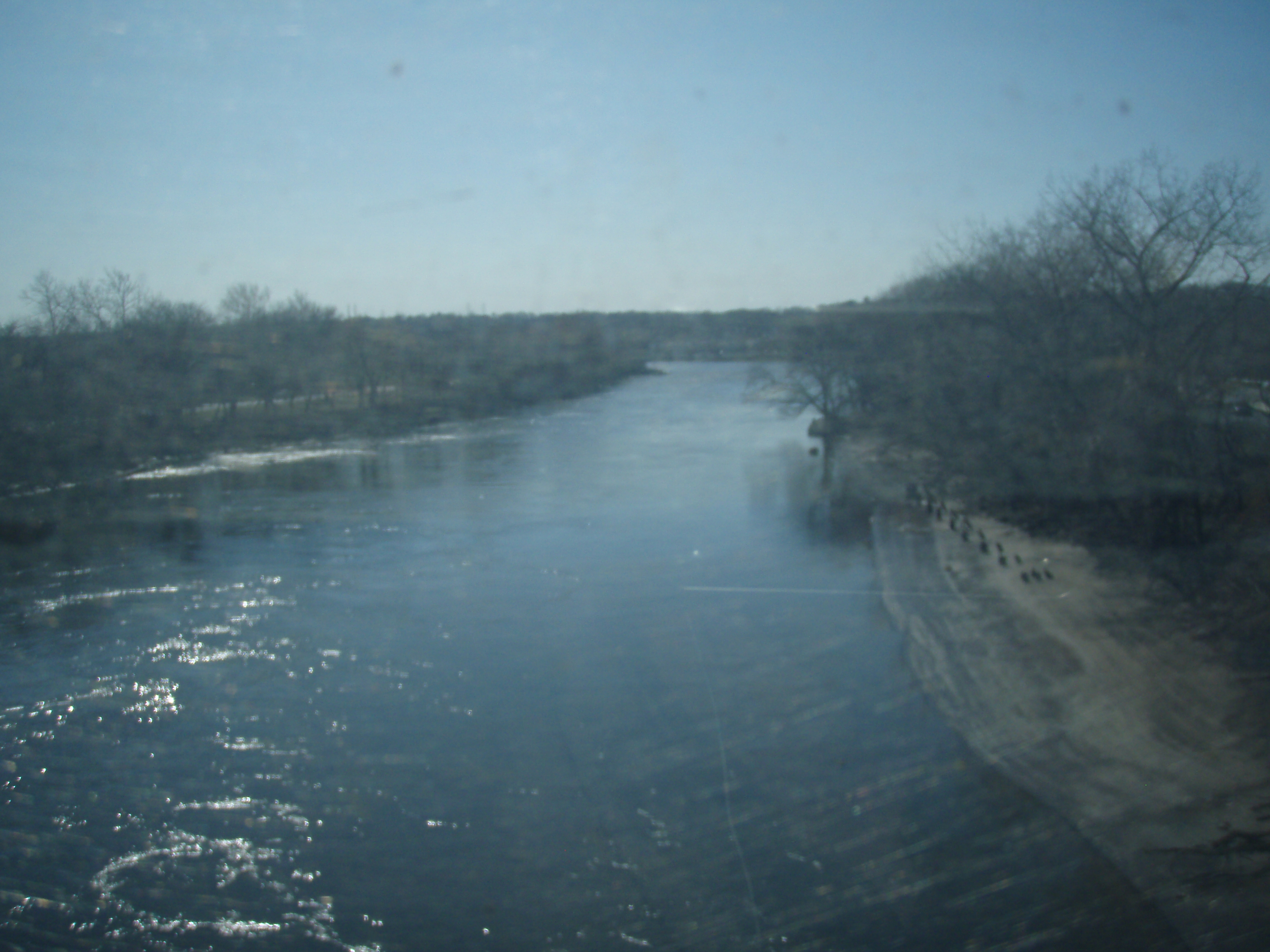
The Passaic River borders Garfield, New Jersey to the west. The groundwater contamination flows towards the river, located approximately 2,500 feet away from the E.C Electroplating facility.

In response to the 1983 leak, E.C Electroplating was directed by the NJDEP to install five monitoring wells and one recovery well to investigate and recover contaminated groundwater. By May 1984, it was estimated that 1,044 gallons and 1,600 pounds of chromium were recovered, around 30% of the spill. After nearly two years, NJDEP allowed E.C Electroplating to seal four of the six wells in May 1985 and to continue monitoring the spill from the remaining two wells; E.C Electroplating failed to comply.

In June 1993, chromium-contaminated groundwater and chromium crystals were discovered in a nearby basement in Garfield Fire House #3. Samplings taken from the firehouse found maximum concentrations of hexavalent chromium at 1,490,000 micrograms per liter (μg/L). Following the discovery, E.C Electroplating entered a Memorandum of Agreement, or a formal agreement, with NJDEP to investigate the extent of the 1983 spill. As of April 2000, samples from four newly installed monitoring wells found hexavalent chromium levels at 1,490,000 micrograms per liter (μg/L), with total chromium levels near 1,500,000 micrograms per liter (μg/L).

=== National intervention ===
The groundwater samplings prompted further investigations in October 2000 into nearby residential and commercial buildings, where it was revealed that several other basements in buildings near the E.C Electroplating plant were also highly contaminated with chromium. In 2002, the NJDEP requested the EPA to investigate the chromium contamination found in these buildings. There were an estimated 700 properties above or near the chromium groundwater contamination. The EPA found that 14 out of the 512 investigated basements had hexavalent chromium levels above acceptable; the EPA removed the chromium and installed systems to prevent further contamination in thirteen out of the fourteen basements.

In late summer of 2010, the Agency for Toxic Substances and Disease Registry (ATSDR) issued a Public Health Advisory for the site, a notice that identifies an immediate threat to human health from a hazardous substance. This was the first Public Health Advisory released by ATSDR since 1999.

== Health and environmental concerns ==
The chromic acid leaked by E.C Electroplating affected local soil and groundwater, exposing local residents and visitors to hexavalent chromium, a toxic form of chromium known to harm the body.

=== Hexavalent chromium contamination ===
Hexavalent chromium is a toxic metal, known to cause several health problems and is a carcinogen. Exposure to hexavalent chromium can cause irritation and problems in the respiratory tract, stomach, and small intestine. It is linked to several cancers, such as lung cancer, oral cancer, and intestinal cancer. During floods, the chromium contaminated groundwater would flood into local Garfield residences and businesses. When the flooding recedes, dried chromium is left behind as yellow dust, which can possibly be inhaled or swallowed by residents or visitors of these areas.

== Clean-up efforts ==
=== Initial clean-up ===
The EPA started a short-term clean-up in the fall of 2011, removing 233 drums of industrial waste and 6,100 gallons of chromium-contaminated water from the site. From 2012 through 2014, the EPA demolished the E.C Electroplating building, and contaminated soils and concrete from the site were excavated and removed. Approximately 5,700 tons of soil and 1,150 tons of concrete were found to be contaminated; the extracted soil and concrete were replaced with backfill to prevent further contamination from stormwater.

In 2014, the EPA completed a Remedial Investigation to evaluate the extent of the contamination and determine which technologies could be used to clean up the site.

=== Current status ===
As of 2017, the EPA is in the process of preparing a remedial design to address the remaining groundwater contamination at the site, and the design is expected to be completed in 2022. Pilot tests to evaluate different methods and technologies to efficiently clean up the chromium have given positive results.

==== Funding ====
E.C Electroplating went out of business in 2009, leaving the Super fund site “orphaned” as there was no longer a responsible party to pay for the clean-up. In 2016, the EPA estimated that the clean-up for the E.C Electroplating site and surrounding areas would cost around $37 million.

In December 2021, the EPA announced that under the Bipartisan Infrastructure Bill, it would invest $1 billion into funding the backlog of underfunded Super fund sites, including the E.C Electroplating site in Garfield.
