= Garfield High School (New Jersey) =

High school in Bergen County, New Jersey, US

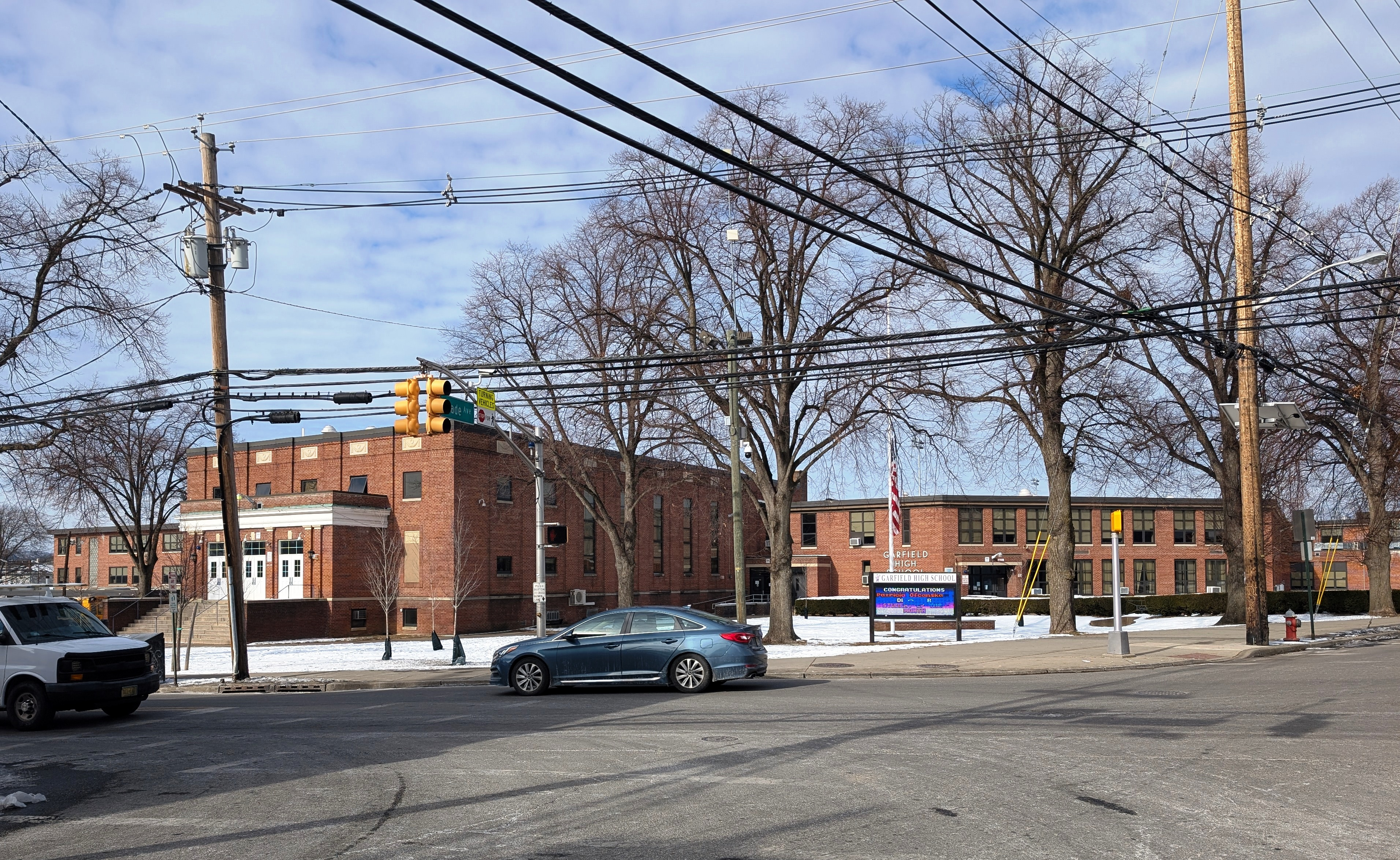

Location
- 500 Palisade Avenue; Garfield, Bergen County, New Jersey 07026; United States; 40.881798°N 74.112094°W

Information
- Type: Public high school
- Motto: To promote success
- Established: September 1956
- School district: Garfield Public Schools
- NCES School ID: 340576000466
- Principal: Dora D'Amico
- Faculty: 95.0 FTEs
- Grades: 9–12
- Enrollment: 1,258 (as of 2024–25)
- Student to teacher ratio: 13.2:1
- Colors: Gold and Purple
- Athletics conference: North Jersey Interscholastic Conference
- Team name: Boilermakers
- Newspaper: The Quill
- Yearbook: Retrospect
- Website: ghs.gboe.org

Garfield High School is a four-year public high school serving students in ninth through twelfth grades from Garfield, in Bergen County, in the U.S. state of New Jersey, operating as the lone secondary school of the Garfield Public Schools.

As of the 2024–25 school year, the school had an enrollment of 1,258 students and 95.0 classroom teachers (on an FTE basis), for a student–teacher ratio of 13.2:1. There were 675 students (53.7% of enrollment) eligible for free lunch and 87 (6.9% of students) eligible for reduced-cost lunch.

== History ==
Garfield High School, constructed at an estimated cost of $1.8 million (equivalent to $21.3 million in 2025), opened in September 1956 with about 1,040 students registered, in excess of the maximum designed enrollment of 1,000. The new school replaced two former elementary schools that had been used on an interim basis to accommodate high school students.

== Awards, recognition and rankings ==
The school was the 294th-ranked public high school in New Jersey out of 337 schools statewide in New Jersey Monthly magazine's September 2016 cover story on the state's "Top Public High Schools." The school was the 307th-ranked public high school in New Jersey out of 339 schools statewide in New Jersey Monthly magazine's 2014 rankings of the state's "Top Public High Schools," using a new ranking methodology.

The school had been ranked 321st in the state of 328 schools in 2012, after being ranked 286th in 2010 out of 322 schools listed. The magazine ranked the school 285th in 2008 out of 316 schools.

Schooldigger.com ranked the school 292nd out of 376 public high schools statewide in its 2010 rankings (an increase of 19 positions from the 2009 rank) which were based on the combined percentage of students classified as proficient or above proficient on the language arts literacy and mathematics components of the High School Proficiency Assessment (HSPA).

In 2012, Schooldigger.com ranked Garfield High School 306th out of 389 New Jersey High Schools in combined HSPA scores in the state, an increase of 10 positions from 2011.

== Athletics ==
The Garfield High School Boilermakers participate in the North Jersey Interscholastic Conference, which is comprised of small-enrollment schools in Bergen, Hudson, Morris and Passaic counties, and was created following a reorganization of sports leagues in Northern New Jersey by the New Jersey State Interscholastic Athletic Association (NJSIAA). Prior to realignment that took effect in the fall of 2010, Garfield was a member of the smaller Bergen-Passaic Scholastic League (BPSL). With 810 students in grades 10-12, the school was classified by the NJSIAA for the 2019–20 school year as Group III for most athletic competition purposes, which included schools with an enrollment of 761 to 1,058 students in that grade range. The school was classified by the NJSIAA as Group IV North for football for 2024–2026, which included schools with 893 to 1,315 students.

The school participates as the host school / lead agency for joint boys / girls swimming teams with Hasbrouck Heights High School. These co-op programs operate under agreements scheduled to expire at the end of the 2023–24 school year.

The 1939 football team defeated Miami (Fla.) High School in a game played at the Miami Orange Bowl in front of a crowd of 25,000 by a score of 16–13, capturing the program's first ever national championship.

The boys baseball team won the North I Group IV state sectional championships in both 1962 and 1965.

The girls volleyball team competed in the Group II state championships, falling to Tenafly High School in 1982 and Fort Lee High School in 1988.

The wrestling team won the North I Group II state sectional championship in 1990.

The girls track team won the Group II indoor state championship in 1991.

The 2015 boys soccer team defeated Dover High School by a score of 4-2 in the tournament final to win the North II Group II state sectional championship, the program's first state title since 1975. The team defeated Holmdel High School by a 2-1 margin, scoring twice with a little more than two minutes remaining in the game, to win the Group II state title at Kean University and capture the program's first state championship.

== Administration ==
The school's principal is Dora D'Amico. Her administration team includes three vice principals.

== Notable alumni ==
- Miles Austin (born 1984), former NFL wide receiver
- Joan Berger (1933–2021, class of 1951), infielder and outfielder who played for the Rockford Peaches in the All-American Girls Professional Baseball League
- Eddie Brigati (born 1945; class of 1963), vocalist, percussionist, lyricist, founding member of the Rascals, and member of the Rock and Roll Hall of Fame as well as the Songwriters Hall of Fame
- Luis Castillo (born 1983), defensive end for the San Diego Chargers in the National Football League (NFL)
- Wayne Chrebet (born 1973), wide receiver for the New York Jets in the NFL
- Thomas J. Duch (born 1956), politician who represented the 36th Legislative District in the New Jersey General Assembly
- Gianfranco Iannotta (born 1994), track and field athlete who won a gold medal at the 2016 Summer Paralympics
- Richard Sadiv (born 1964), sports coach and powerlifter
- Sam Sebo (1906–1933), NFL player
- Richard F. Visotcky (1929–2002), politician who served as mayor of Garfield and for six terms as a member of the New Jersey General Assembly

== Notable faculty ==
Notable current and former faculty members include:

- Dick Vitale (born 1939), sports broadcaster who coached a single season at Garfield High School (1963–64)
