= GE U34CH =

American passenger diesel locomotive

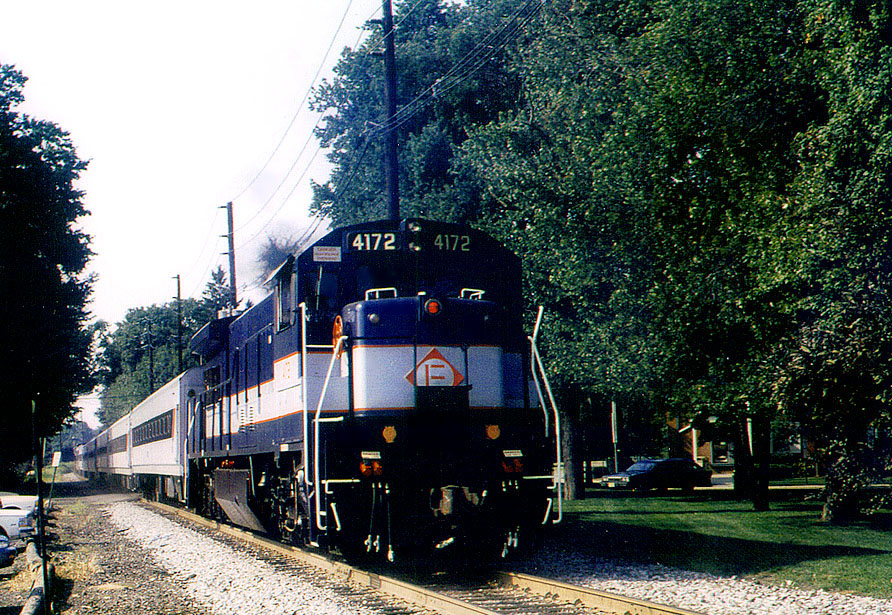
- U34CH 4172 on the "Farewell to the U34CH" excursion at Hillsdale, New Jersey in August 1994
Type and origin
- Power type: Diesel-electric
- Builder: GE Transportation Systems
- Model: U34CH
- Total produced: 33
Specifications
- Configuration
  - AAR: C-C
  - UIC: Co'Co'
- Gauge: 4 ft 8 1/2 in (1,435 mm) standard gauge
Performance figures
- Maximum speed: 103 mph (166 km/h)
- Power output: 3,400 hp (2,500 kW)
Career
- Nicknames: Bluebirds
- Locale: Northeastern United States: North Jersey and Lower New York State (Erie Lackawanna Lines)
- Disposition: One preserved (EL 3372/NJT 4172), rest presumed scrapped

The U34CH is a 3,600 hp (2,700 kW) passenger diesel locomotive built by General Electric between 1970 and 1973. In total, 33 U34CH units were built; 32 were built for the New Jersey Department of Transportation and operated by the Erie Lackawanna Railway and, later, Conrail, with the last unit coming as a later rebuild of a GE U30C for the New York MTA.

== History ==
=== Erie Lackawanna, 1970–76 ===
The 32 initial locomotives numbered 3351–3382, were built by GE for the New Jersey Department of Transportation (NJDOT) and operated by the Erie Lackawanna Railway with new Pullman Standard push-pull coaches. The units were intended to replace locomotives in suburban commuter service out of Hoboken, New Jersey. The U34CH preceded the GE U36C in GE's catalog. The U34CH was the first GE locomotive to use steel crowned pistons to develop 3,400 hp (2,500 kW) with an extra 200 hp for the HEP and was the first commuter locomotive built with shaft driven HEP–that is, a HEP alternator driven by the locomotive prime mover rather than by a separate diesel. To provide HEP at the proper AC frequency the FDL-16 prime mover ran at a constant 900 RPM, so traction horsepower was 3430 minus whatever was going into HEP. By contrast, when not providing HEP, the FDL-16 could produce 3600 traction horsepower at its usual 1050 RPM. To show their NJDOT ownership, the units were painted in a dark blue and silver paint scheme with NJDOT logo and were often called "Bluebirds" by rail enthusiasts. The U34CHs on the weekends were sometimes used in Erie Lackawanna freight service, often being on freight duty from Saturday to Sunday and returning to commuter service Monday morning.

=== Conrail, 1976–82 ===
On April 1, 1976, the Erie Lackawanna, which had been bankrupt since 1972, was merged into Conrail. The U34CHs were assigned new numbers 4151–4182. Only one U34CH (3351) would receive Conrail lettering. It was involved in a wreck in 1974 and was sent to the GE apparatus shop in Cleveland to be rebuilt. It returned painted in a Bicentennial paint scheme with Conrail lettering and the number 1776. It was eventually renumbered 4151 in an NJ DOT paint scheme. The other U34CH units showed little change from their EL days and continued to operate on former EL lines out of Hoboken, New Jersey. They continued to wear their EL "Bluebird" paint scheme sans EL markings with their new numbers.

In 1978 one final U34CH was built for the New York MTA (later Metro-North Railroad) as part of their commitment to service to Port Jervis, New York. This new U34CH, numbered 4183, was rebuilt from an accident-damaged former Chicago and North Western Railway GE U30C (C&NW number 934). It too was painted in the "Bluebird" paint scheme, but with an MTA logo on its nose.

=== New Jersey Transit, 1983–90 ===
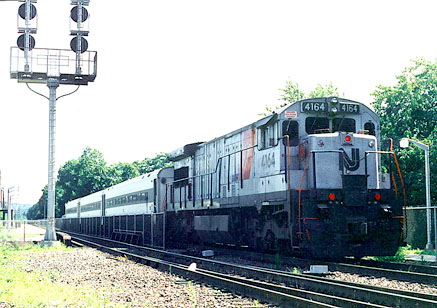
U34CH 4164 is painted in NJ Transit's "Disco Stripe" paint scheme at Suffern, New York in July 1991

Conrail operated commuter service on behalf of NJ DOT until January 1, 1983, when New Jersey Transit took over all commuter rail operations in the State of New Jersey. The U34CHs, having been owned by NJDOT, were conveyed to NJ Transit. Many of the U34CHs would remain in their "Bluebird" paint scheme with only a silver patch and NJ Transit logo painted on their noses to indicate their ownership. Seven U34CHs were repainted into NJ Transit's "Disco Stripe" scheme. The U34CHs continued to operate primarily on former EL lines out of Hoboken, New Jersey.

=== Final years and disposition, 1990–96 ===
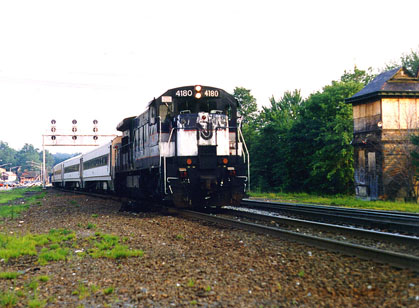
U34CH 4180 received the silver patch and NJT logo on its nose. Unfortunately with poor surface preparation, the silver paint did not hold up very well and most of it would wear off. This is how many U34CHs appeared in their final years. The 4180 is seen at Waldwick, New Jersey in July 1994

By the 1990s the U34CHs were starting to show their age. As New Jersey Transit received rebuilt former Penn Central GP40PH-2B from Conrail's Juniata shops during 1993–94, the fate of the U34CH was sealed. As the units suffered major mechanical failures, they were removed from service rather than repaired. The U34CHs were formally retired from passenger service in August 1994, at which time the United Railway Historical Society (URHS) ran a "Farewell to the U34CH" excursion. A few U34CHs were used in work train service until the delivery of replacement EMD GP40-2s.

For a time, three U34CHs were leased to SEPTA and one unit, 4154, received SEPTA's blue diesel paint scheme. Nine of the U34CHs were scrapped. Nineteen U34CHs were sold to Conrail, which eventually sold the units to GEC-Alstom which shipped them to Mexico. Of the units shipped to Mexico, five U34CHs are known to have been in operation, with one being in service as late as 2003. Their current status is unclear, due to a privatization of the Mexican railroads leading to many older locomotives being scrapped. Two U34CHs were sold to Conrail and then sold to RMDI. Both units were scrapped at Pittston, PA during the summer of 2003. One U34CH was sold to América Latina Logística of Brazil for parts use. All U34CHs were off NJ Transit property by 1996.

== Preservation ==
One U34CH, 4172 (formerly 3372) was donated to the United Railway Historical Society of New Jersey (URHS) and was stored on the New York and Greenwood Lake Railway in Passaic, New Jersey. In October 2013, the URHS began a fundraising effort to restore 3372 called "Project U-Boat." The campaign had raised enough funds by March 2014, and later that year, the URHS began looking for bids to move the locomotive. On October 29, Morristown & Erie Railway crews were sent to Passaic to rescue the U-Boat and remove it from NY&GL property. The locomotive was stored at the URHS Restoration facility in Boonton, NJ while funds were being raised to restore it to operation. Restoration efforts began in September 2022. By September 2023, the locomotive had been cosmetically restored, with mechanical restoration still ongoing.
