= New York and Greenwood Lake Railway (1996) =

Defunct shortline railroad

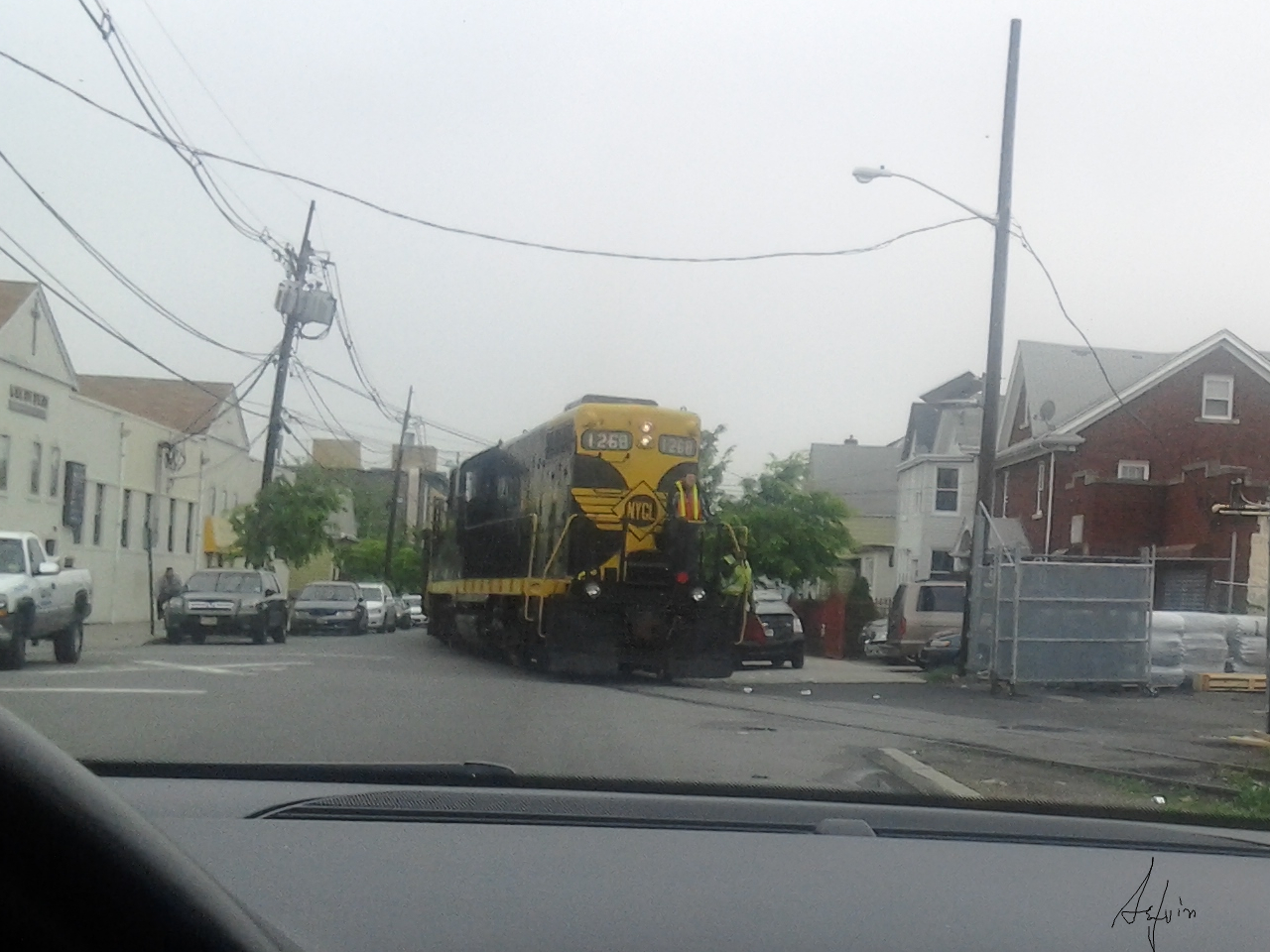
- The NYGL GP7 locomotive moving freight along Monroe St. track in Garfield, NJ.

Overview
- Headquarters: Passaic, New Jersey
- Reporting mark: NYGL
- Locale: Passaic, New Jersey; Garfield, New Jersey
- Dates of operation: 1996–2019
- Predecessor: Conrail; Erie Railroad

Technical
- Track gauge: 4 ft 8 1/2 in (1,435 mm) standard gauge
- Electrification: No
- Length: 1.1 miles (1.8 kilometres)

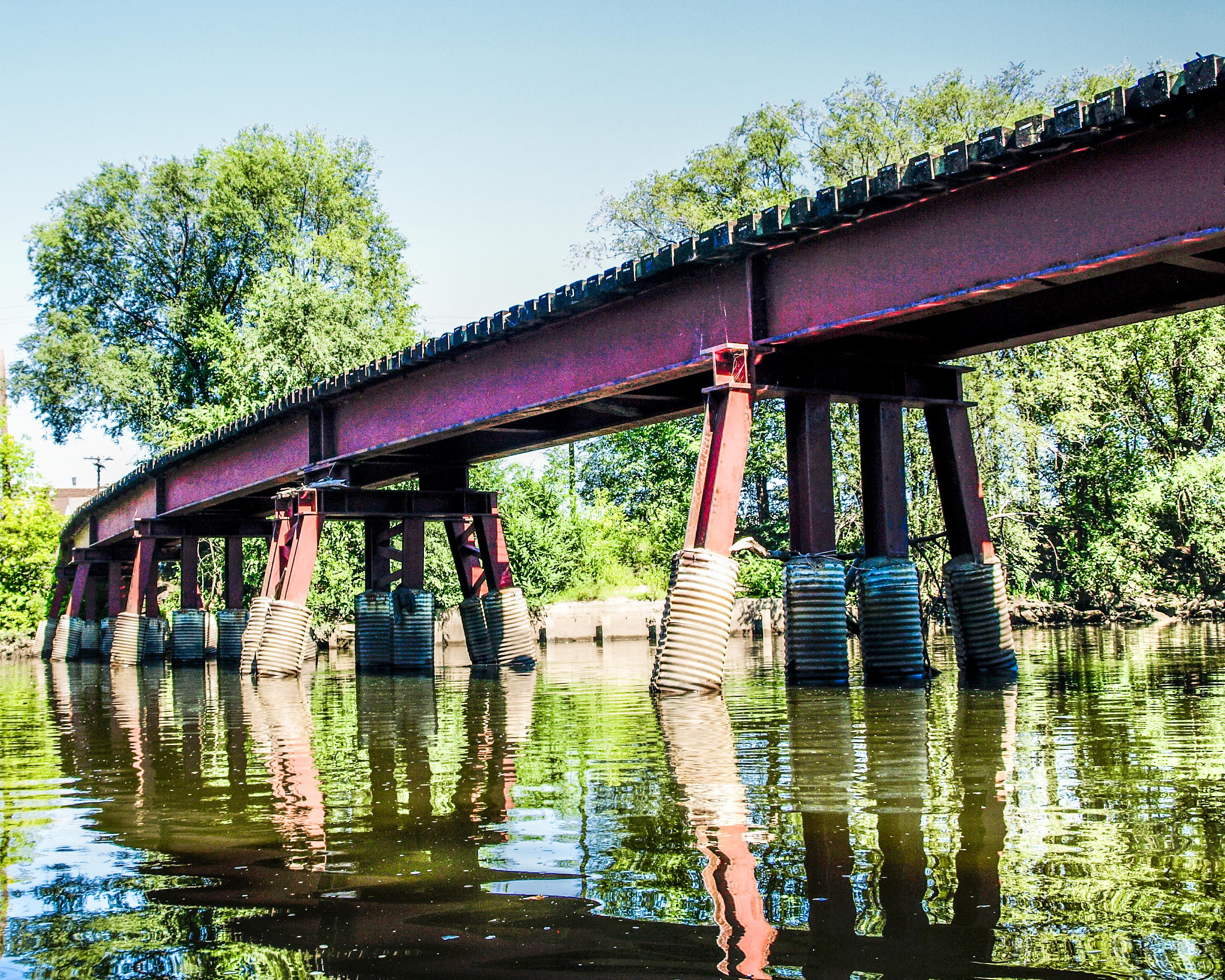
Crossing of Passaic River

The New York and Greenwood Lake Railway (reporting mark NYGL) was a shortline railroad owned by James Wilson and based in Passaic, New Jersey. It operated primarily to service transfer station facilities for a few private companies, with a trans-load facility at its yard in Passaic. Cars ran on NYGL's trackage, the former Erie Railroad Dundee spur, to interchange with the Norfolk Southern Railway on New Jersey Transit's Bergen County Line in Garfield.

Former owner Conrail slated the Dundee spur to close in 1996, but customer Atlantic Coast Fibers protested. As a result, Conrail sold the line. The transfer facility also serviced Phill-Con Services' construction debris receiving facility. Phill-Con used the Greenwood shed as a waste transfer station for shipment to Alabama from May 2005 through early 2009. That station became unprofitable with the downturn in constructions and the opening of the nearby Kearny landfill in January 2009, undercutting Phill-Con's disposal fees by $20 per ton.

The shortline's name was taken from an earlier unrelated New York and Greenwood Lake Railway that merged into the Erie Railroad in 1943.

The NY&GL suspended operations in 2012, when its last customer ceased operations. The railroad had various equipment, including locomotives NYGL 1267 (GP9) and 1268 (GP7), as well as Erie 436 (SW9), EL 3372 (U34CH) and ex-LIRR 616 ALCO FA-1 stored in Passaic, NJ. In 2014, the 3372 was moved to Boonton, NJ for restoration by URHS, and the 436 has been moved to Ringoes, NJ for excursion service on the Black River and Western Railroad. They also have several passenger coaches and locomotives NYGL 935 and Erie 833 stored in Port Jervis, NY. The equipment stored in Port Jervis was slated to be used for a planned passenger excursion service along the scenic upper Delaware River, which failed to materialize. The passenger coaches have been heavily vandalized, but the 2 locomotives have stayed in relatively good shape. In 2014, the Erie 833 was cosmetically touched up, and moved to Spencer, North Carolina by Norfolk Southern, for the "Streamliners in Spencer" event, and then returned to Port Jervis shortly thereafter.

== Decline and abandonment ==
On September 13, 2007, the property of the railroad was seized by the IRS for unpaid taxes, and sold for $565,000 to Passaic Street Properties, LLC, a non-carrier, who thereby acquired the rights to operate the line. On May 1, 2018, the company filed a Notice of Exemption to abandon the line and develop the property, including some portion of it as a city park. In addition to the exemption, the town of Garfield and Passaic cut the portion of the spur at the Dundee-Bergen line connection, making the line out of service and isolated from shipments during possible reactivation. On June 10, 2019, the railway formally petitioned for abandonment, citing negotiations with the future property owner, effectively permanently ending operation of the spur. All equipment was removed on February 28, 2020, and all cars and equipment were removed on October 26, 2020, marking the end of the New York and Greenwood Lake Railway.
