= Joseph Villa =

American pianist

Joseph Emil Villa (August 9, 1948 – April 13, 1995) was an American pianist.

He was born in Garfield, New Jersey. He studied at the Juilliard School under Sascha Gorodnitzki and made his recital debut at Alice Tully Hall in 1972 with an all Liszt program. Many of his public appearances were as an accompanist for artists like soprano Jessye Norman and violinist Eugene Fodor, and his high reputation rests on a small number of recordings, one of which was awarded the Grand Prix du Disque in 1978. Joseph specialized in the Romantic repertory.

He made his first public appearance at Juilliard at the age of ten. By the age of 18, he was touring extensively, accompanying violinist Joseph Fuchs. He won the 1968 Kosciuszko Foundation's annual Chopin Competition, as well as Liszt's Second Piano Concerto in A Major competition with the Juilliard Orchestra at Alice Tully Hall in 1970. In 1970, he appeared on the Piano Seminar series for the Juilliard Institute of Special Studies. Villa was also invited by Gyorgy Cziffra to perform at the Festival de la Chaise Dieu in France. On television, he's played programs such as CBC's Camera Three and NBC's Today Show. He worked at the University of Connecticut. Much of his praise comes from that of Arthur Rubinstein, Claudio Arrau, Alicia de Larrocha, and André Previn.

Villa died on April 13, 1995, aged 46, at Saint Vincent's Catholic Medical Center in Greenwich Village. The cause was AIDS, said Steven Gray, his companion.

== Bibliography ==
- "Joseph Villa, Pianist, 46." Obituary in The New York Times. 15 April 1995.
- Jim Beckerman. "Joseph Villa, Concert Pianist." Obituary in The Record (Bergen County, NJ). 15 April 1995.
