= Richard Sadiv =

American sports coach

Rich Sadiv
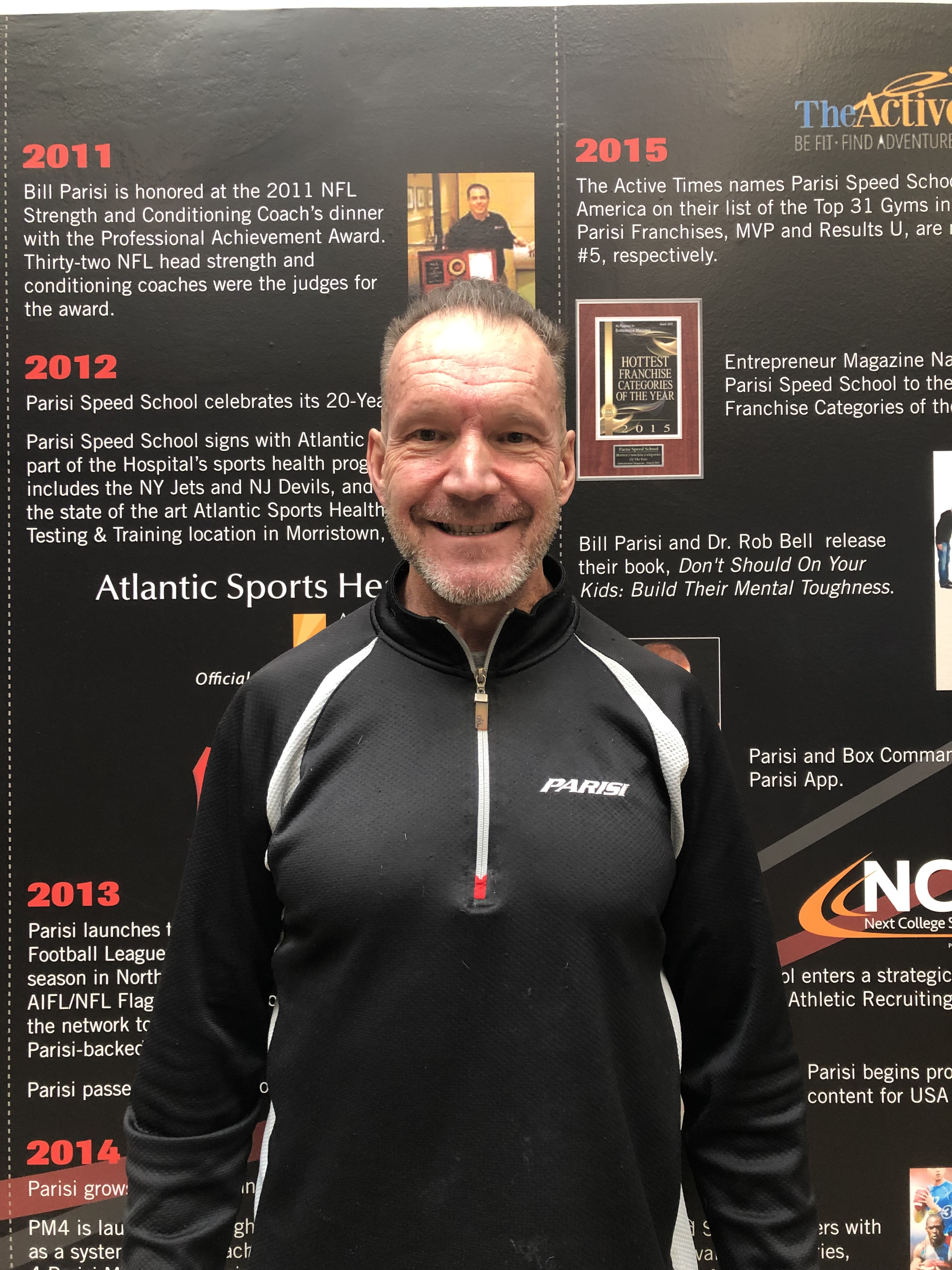
- Born: Richard Sadiv; 1964 (age 61–62)
- Occupations: Sports coach Powerlifter
- Organization: Parisi Speed School
- Known for: Sadiv Sets
- Website: richsadiv.com

Richard Sadiv (born 1964) is an American sports coach and powerlifter. Sadiv Sets are named after him.

== Early life and education ==
Sadiv was born in 1964. He was educated at Garfield High School. Later, he attended William Paterson University and graduated with a bachelor's degree. He also holds certifications from the National Academy of Sports Medicine and FMS.

== Career ==
In 2010, he joined Parisi Speed School. He is the current director of the NFL Combine program at Parisi Speed School. He has coached athletes such as Brian Toal, Phil Simms, and T. J. Clemmings.

Sadiv acquired Parisi Speed School in 2015 and now owns it.

In 2018, he was inducted into the World Natural Powerlifting Federation Hall of Fame for his career as a powerlifter in which he attained a world record, five national records, and fourteen state records in New Jersey. A year later, he acquired Escape Fitness Fairlawn.

In 2021, Sadiv was inducted into the New Jersey Strength and Power Hall of Fame. He also holds a Guinness World Record for the one-hour team deadlift.

As a philanthropist, he was New Jersey Champion of the year for Best Buddies, a program for persons with impairments, with his wife Nanci. He is a former Special Olympics judge.

== Recognition ==
- World Natural Powerlifting Hall of Fame (2018)
- New Jersey Strength and Power Hall of Fame (2021)
