= United Railroad Historical Society of New Jersey =

Railroad preservation organization based in New Jersey

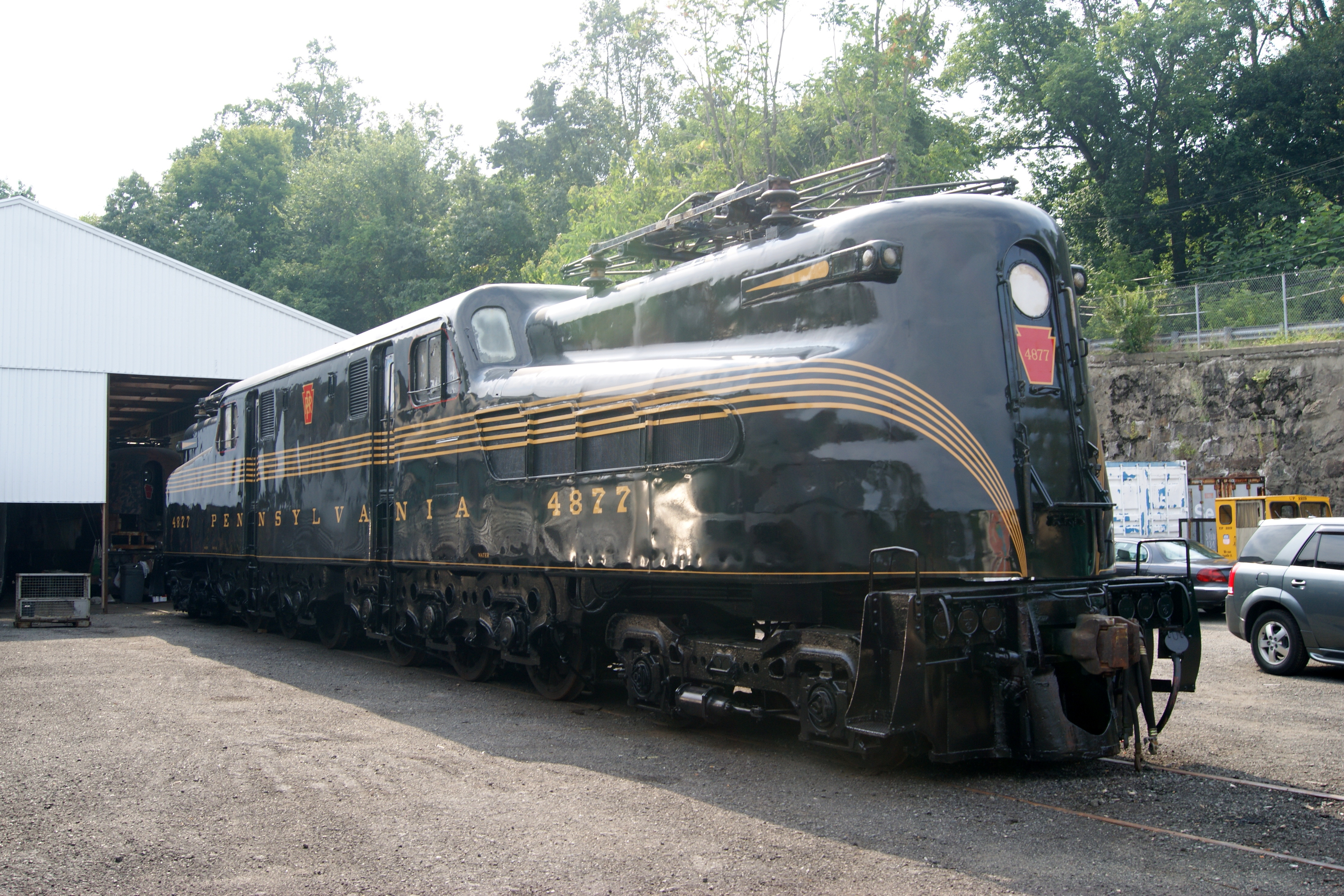
Pennsylvania Railroad GG1 #4877 on display at the URHS facility

The United Railroad Historical Society of New Jersey, Inc. (or URHS of NJ) is a non-profit educational organization directed at supporting the preservation of New Jersey's historical railroad equipment and artifacts for the proposed New Jersey Transportation Heritage Center or in its absence, another railroad museum in New Jersey.

In order to coordinate resources, representatives from most of New Jersey's major railroad-interest organizations formed the URHS of NJ in 1987. URHS of NJ has been working toward rescuing potential items from scrapping and has been assisting in searching for the location of The New Jersey Transportation Heritage Center. The URHS of NJ expects to play a major role in its design, content and operation.

The United Railroad Historical Society of NJ Inc. is located at 104 Morris Avenue in Boonton, NJ. The zip code is 07005–1314.

== Locomotives ==
The URHS has a handful of locomotives either restored or under restoration, while some are awaiting restoration.

Locomotives:

- "Baltimore and Ohio Railroad #412:" A Baldwin VO-1000 originally built in February 1945 as United States Navy #19. Served Naval Weapons Station Earle for many years before being donated to URHS. Was painted in a Baltimore and Ohio livery and renumbered to #412, as the B&O's units were numbered #413 to #437 and were all scrapped upon retirement. Currently leased to the SMS Rail Lines for switching and freight service. - Operational, leased to the SMS Rail Lines.
- Central Railroad of New Jersey #1523: An EMD GP7 built in November 1952 for passenger service between Jersey City, Bay Head, Raritan, Matawan and Atlantic Highlands, New Jersey before commuter services were taken over by Budd Rail Diesel Cars. It underwent Conrail ownership in April 1976 before being transferred to the New Jersey Department of Transportation that December. Was retired and donated to URHS in 1993, restored to its early CNJ livery and was leased to the Black River and Western Railroad and the Cape May Seashore Lines in the early 2000s before returning in 2022. - Stored serviceable.
- Central Railroad of New Jersey #1524: Another EMD GP7 built in November 1952 and had the same career as #1523 before serving Conrail and NJDOT before being retired and donated to URHS in 1993. However, it stayed on URHS property and was never leased out. - Cosmetically restored to its early CNJ livery.
- Erie Railroad #436: An EMD SW9 built in April 1952 for local freight service in northern New Jersey. Changed ownership to the Erie Lackawanna Railroad in 1960 and was assigned to switch and prepare coaches in the yard near Hoboken Terminal. Later served Conrail in April 1976 and NJDOT in 1983 until being retired and donated to URHS in the 1990s. - Cosmetically restored to its Erie Livery.
- Erie Lackawanna #3372: A GE U34CH built in April 1971 for push–pull commuter service with then-new Comet I railcars based out of Hoboken, New Jersey. Later underwent Conrail ownership in April 1976 and renumbered to #4172 before being transferred to NJDOT in 1983. Continued serving in commuter service and pulled a "Farewell to the U34CH" excursion before being retired and donated to URHS in 1994. It became the sole survivor of the U34CH. - Cosmetically restored to Erie Lackawanna Livery, undergoing restoration to operating condition.
- NJDOT #4253: An EMD E8 built in June 1952 as Pennsylvania Railroad #5793 to replace the PRR's steam locomotives on passenger trains. Pulled notable trains such as the Broadway Limited until transferring ownership to Penn Central in 1968, being renumbered to #4253. Continued passenger service into Conrail in 1976 and NJDOT in 1983 before being retired in September 1987 and later ended up on URHS property. - Cosmetically restored to its NJDOT livery.
- New Jersey Transit #958: A GE E60CH built in November 1975 for Amtrak and was numbered #958. Initially built to replace the GG1s on fast trains on the Northeast Corridor, it was restricted to 85 MPH due to rough riding and was later replaced by the EMD AEM-7 by 1984. Later sold to NJT that year for commuter service on the North Jersey Coast Line before being retired in 1998 and donated to URHS not long after. - Stored, awaiting cosmetic restoration.
- New Jersey Transit #4424: An ABB ALP-44M built in 1996 for the new Midtown Direct service, which provided a one-seat ride to New York Penn Station. It was initially meant to be overhauled with the rest of the fleet in 2009, but NJT found out that it was more efficient to replace the fleet with additional Bombardier ALP-46s. Also served on commuter services on the Northeast Corridor, Morris & Essex, Gladstone and Montclair-Boonton Lines before being retired in 2011 along with the rest of the fleet. It was stored along with three other sister engines at the Meadowlands Maintenance Complex, while the rest of the fleet were stored on the Lackawanna Cut-Off until being cut up for scrap in 2026. Was donated to URHS in July 2023 and is the youngest locomotive of the fleet. - On static display.
- New York Central #4076: Another EMD E8 built July 1953 to replace the NYC's steam fleet on passenger duties. Pulled famous trains such as the 20th Century Limited until its last run in 1967. Changed ownership to Penn Central and renumbered to #4323 before later serving on Conrail and NJDOT before being retired in 1982 and donated to URHS sometime after 1987. Was repainted as "Erie #834" in November 1990 to haul excursions. - Stored, awaiting cosmetic restoration.
- New York Central #4083: Another EMD E8 built in August 1953 and had the same career as #4076. Wore an experimental "Century Green" livery in 1960. Later served Penn Central, being renumbered to #4326 before serving Conrail and NJDOT before being retired in 1982 and donated to URHS in 1995. - Cosmetically restored to its "Century Green" livery.
- Public Service Electric & Gas Company #100: A GE 100-ton switcher built in October 1958 for industrial use. It mainly moved coal hoppers at the Bergen Generating Station in Ridgefield Park, New Jersey before being retired and donated to URHS in the 1990s. It now serves as a switcher at the restoration yard. - Operational.
- Pennsylvania Railroad #4877: A Class GG1 built in January 1939 for service on the Northeast Corridor between New York City and Washington, D.C. where it hauled fast passenger trains. Changed ownership to Penn Central in February 1968 and later Conrail in April 1976. Was loaned to NJDOT in the 1980s for commuter service on the North Jersey Coast Line. Was one of two GG1s left in service until retirement in October 1983. Was nicknamed "Ol' Big Red" during the time and was donated to URHS in 1991. - Cosmetically restored to its 1930s "5-stripe" livery.
- Pennsylvania Railroad #4879: Another Class GG1 built in February 1939 for service on the Northeast Corridor. Fell under same ownership with Penn Central and later Conrail before being loaned to NJDOT in the 1980s. Was the second GG1 left in service with #4877 until retirement in October 1983 and donated to URHS in 1991. - Cosmetically restored to its 1950s "single stripe" livery.
- Pennsylvania Railroad #5788: Another EMD E8 built in May 1952 and had the same career as #5793. Renumbered to #4248 before serving Penn Central, Conrail and NJDOT before being retired in 1987. Was repainted as "Erie #835" in November 1990 for excursion duties. - Stored, awaiting cosmetic restoration.
- Pennsylvania Railroad #7000: An EMD GP9 built in October 1955 to replace the PRR's steam fleet on freight trains. Later served Penn Central, Conrail and NJ Transit before being retired in 1995 and donated to URHS. Was leased out to the Cape May Seashore Lines in the early to mid 2000s for excursion service. - Stored serviceable.
- "Reading Company #284:" An EMD F7 originally built in October 1949 as Chicago and Northwestern #4074A for commuter service based out of Chicago. Was rebuilt and renumbered to #424 in 1961 and continued service until being purchased by NJDOT in 1983, only to be retired in 1985 and donated to URHS in 1987. It was then restored as "Reading #284" to represent one of the railroads that served in New Jersey, as all the original Reading F7s were scrapped. It was sent to the North Carolina Transportation Museum in 2014 to attend the "Streamliners at Spencer" event before returning to New Jersey. - On static display.
- Reading Company #492: An ALCO RS-3 built in July 1952 to replace the RDG's steam fleet on freight trains. Later saw service on the Pennsylvania-Reading Seashore Lines before being sold to the United Railway Supply of Montreal in 1973. Later acquired by the Roberval and Saguenay Railway and was renumbered to #31. It was acquired again by the Delaware Otsego Corporation and was renumbered as Fonda, Johnstown and Gloversville Railroad #103 before being acquired by URHS in 1989. Restored to its original Reading livery in 1991. - Stored, awaiting cosmetic restoration.
- Unknown 45-tonner: A GE 45-ton switcher built in 1940 of unknown heritage. It did serve an unknown facility in Michigan before being purchased by the Liberty Historic Railway and wears its current colors of the organization along with a CNJ logo. It was later donated to URHS, repowered with a Cummins diesel engine and still works as yard power alongside PSE&G #100, being the oldest locomotive of the fleet. - Operational.

== Organizations involved ==
The URHS board of directors is, as of 2023 composed of representatives of 9 of the original 17 member groups. The purpose of this is to assure all participate equally in the decision-making and activities and will be representative of all of the local railroad history community. Individuals may join any member organization or The Friends of the New Jersey Transportation Heritage Center to participate in URHS efforts.

- Black River and Western Historical Trust
- Erie Lackawanna Historical Society
- Jersey Central Railway Historical Society, Inc. - Chapter, NRHS
- Lackawanna Chapter, The Railway & Locomotive Historical Society
- Liberty Historic Railway, Inc.
- New York, Susquehanna and Western Technical and Historical Society
- North Jersey Electric Railway Historical Society
- Tri-State Railway Historical Society Chapter, NRHS
- Whippany Railway Museum, Inc.

== Preservation activities ==
A large part of the URHS collection was moved from the Lebanon and Ridgefield Park NJ storage locations to Boonton railyard in 2010. With that accomplished the ability to do cosmetic restoration was greatly enhanced.

The organization leased a large vacant building in 2021 to allow for further preservation work to be conducted indoors.
