= Garfield Public Schools =

School district in Bergen County, New Jersey, US

Address
- 34 Outwater Lane Garfield, Bergen County, New Jersey, 07026; United States
- Coordinates: 40.881549°N 74.113151°W

District information
- Grades: PreK-12
- Superintendent: Dr. Richard Tomko
- Business administrator: Gioacchino LoBue
- Schools: 12
- Affiliation: Former Abbott district

Students and staff
- Enrollment: 4,713 (as of 2020–21)
- Faculty: 438.1 FTEs
- Student–teacher ratio: 10.8:1

Other information
- District Factor Group: B
- Website: www.gboe.org
Ind.	Per pupil	District spending	Rank (*)	K-12 average	%± vs. average
1A	Total Spending	$20,466	79	$18,891	8.3%
1	Budgetary Cost	14,840	59	14,783	0.4%
2	Classroom Instruction	9,023	65	8,763	3.0%
6	Support Services	2,549	70	2,392	6.6%
8	Administrative Cost	1,373	38	1,485	−7.5%
10	Operations & Maintenance	1,654	55	1,783	−7.2%
13	Extracurricular Activities	182	24	268	−32.1%
16	Median Teacher Salary	58,059	17	64,043
Data from NJDoE 2014 Taxpayers' Guide to Education Spending. *Of K-12 districts with more than 3,500 students. Lowest spending=1; Highest=103

The Garfield Public Schools is a comprehensive community public school district that serves students in pre-Kindergarten through twelfth grade from Garfield, in Bergen County, in the U.S. state of New Jersey. The district is one of 31 former Abbott districts statewide that were established pursuant to the decision by the New Jersey Supreme Court in Abbott v. Burke which are now referred to as "SDA Districts" based on the requirement for the state to cover all costs for school building and renovation projects in these districts under the supervision of the New Jersey Schools Development Authority.

As of the 2020–21 school year, the district, comprised of 12 schools, had an enrollment of 4,713 students and 438.1 classroom teachers (on an FTE basis), for a student–teacher ratio of 10.8:1.

The district had been classified by the New Jersey Department of Education as being in District Factor Group "B", the second-lowest of eight groupings. District Factor Groups organize districts statewide to allow comparison by common socioeconomic characteristics of the local districts. From lowest socioeconomic status to highest, the categories are A, B, CD, DE, FG, GH, I and J.

== Awards and recognition ==
In 2023, Washington Irving School #4 was one of nine schools in New Jersey that was recognized as a National Blue Ribbon School by the United States Department of Education.

== Schools ==
Schools in the district (with 2020–21 enrollment data from the National Center for Education Statistics) are:

Preschool

- Garfield Early Childhood Learning Center (178 students; in PreK)
- Garfield Public Preschool Annex (95; PreK)
- Garfield Public Preschool Annex 3 (159; PreK)

Elementary schools

- Washington Irving School #4 (382; K-5)
- Woodrow Wilson School #5 (280; K-5)
- Abraham Lincoln Elementary School #6 (365; PreK-5)
- Theodore Roosevelt School #7 (273; K-5)
- Christopher Columbus School #8 (306; K-5)
- Thomas Jefferson School #9 (295; K-5)
- James Madison School #10 (245; K-5)

Middle school

- Garfield Middle School (989; 6-8)

High school

- Garfield High School (1,159; 9-12)

== Administration ==
Core members of the district's administration are: Dr. Richard Tomko, superintendent of schools, was hired in March 2024

- Gioacchino LoBue, business administrator and board secretary

== Board of education ==
The district's board of education, comprised of nine members, sets policy and oversees the fiscal and educational operation of the district through its administration. As a Type II school district, the board's trustees are elected directly by voters to serve three-year terms of office on a staggered basis, with three seats up for election each year. The board appoints a superintendent to oversee the district's day-to-day operations and a business administrator to supervise the business functions of the district.

Until 2020, Garfield had been one of about a dozen districts statewide (five of which are in Bergen County) which held school elections in April and in which voters also decided on passage of the annual school budget. In June 2020, the city council voted to shift school elections from April to November, with the first election under the new calendar to take place in 2021; this change will also mean that voters no longer vote on the school budget, as long as spending increases are within the state-mandated threshold.

In January 2025, the city council voted to shift school elections back to April and was granted an injunction to prevent the school board from moving the date back to November. The city council argued that the return to April would allow the public to vote on adoption of the district's budget, but a 2024 law restricts voting on the budget to situations where a 2% cap is exceeded.
