= Pennsylvania Railroad class R1 =

American electric locomotive prototype

PRR R1
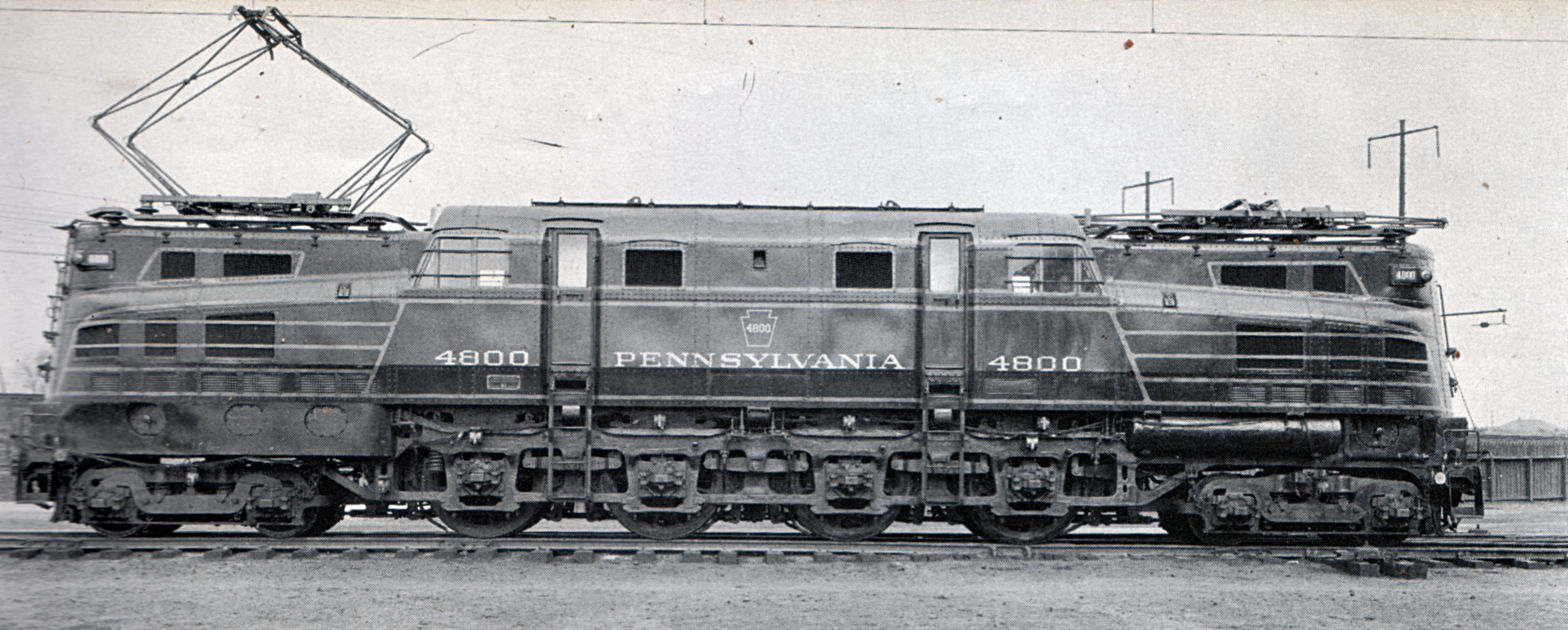
- R1 #4800 in its builders' portrait
Type and origin
- Power type: Electric
- Builder: Baldwin-Westinghouse
- Serial number: BLW: 61817
- Build date: 1934
- Total produced: 1
Specifications
- Configuration
  - Whyte: 4-8-4OE
  - AAR: 2-D-2
  - UIC: 2'Do2'
- Gauge: 4 ft 8 1/2 in (1,435 mm) standard gauge
- Leading dia.: 36 in (0.914 m)
- Driver dia.: 62 in (1.575 m)
- Wheelbase: 54 ft 0 in (16.46 m)
- Length: 64 ft 8 in (19.71 m)
- Width: 10 ft 6.19 in (3.21 m)
- Height: 15 ft 0 in (4.57 m) over locked-down pantographs
- Axle load: 57,500 lb (26,080 kg; 26.08 t)
- Adhesive weight: 230,000 lb (104,300 kg; 104.3 t)
- Loco weight: 402,000 lb (182,300 kg; 182.3 t)
- Fuel capacity: 487 US gal (1,840 L; 406 imp gal) (for train heat boiler)
- Water cap.: 2,041 US gal (7,730 L; 1,699 imp gal) (for train heat boiler)
- Electric system/s: 11 kV AC @ 25 Hz
- Current pickup: Pantograph
- Traction motors: Westinghouse, 625 hp (466 kW), eight off
Performance figures
- Maximum speed: 100 mph (160 km/h)
- Power output: 5,000 hp (3,700 kW)
- Tractive effort: 18,750 lbf (83.4 kN) at 100 mph (160 km/h)
Career
- Numbers: 4800, later 4899, later 4999
- Retired: 1959
- Scrapped: 1959

The Pennsylvania Railroad's class R1 comprised a single prototype electric locomotive constructed in 1934 by the Baldwin Locomotive Works of Philadelphia, Pennsylvania, US, with the electrical equipment by Westinghouse.

It was built as a competitor to the GG1 design, but after trials the GG1 was selected for volume production on the basis of its superior tracking and riding qualities; the R1 prototype, however, remained in service. It was numbered 4800 originally, swapped numbers with the victorious GG1 prototype to #4899, but was moved in May 1940 to #4999 to make room for the expanding GG1 fleet.

For many years, the R1's regular duties involved hauling the westbound Broadway Limited and returning eastward with a mail and express train. The long rigid wheelbase of the locomotive caused occasional derailments in Sunnyside Yard and elsewhere.

The R1 design had four driven axles in a rigid locomotive frame, like a steam locomotive. Each was driven by two 625-horsepower (466 kW) traction motors driving the wheels through a quill drive and sprung cups. Each end of the double-ended locomotive has a four-wheel truck to guide the locomotive at speed, giving the R1 a 4-8-4 wheel arrangement in the Whyte notation (AAR: 2-D-2; UIC: 2'Do2'). Besides the R1, the PRR did not build or order any other 4-8-4 locomotives, however the T1 duplex was essentially a 4-8-4 with two sets of driving wheels as a 4-4-4-4. In many respects the design resembled the earlier, lighter P5, but with an extra driving axle and lower axle loads.
