= Garfield, New Jersey =

City in Bergen County, New Jersey, US

- City
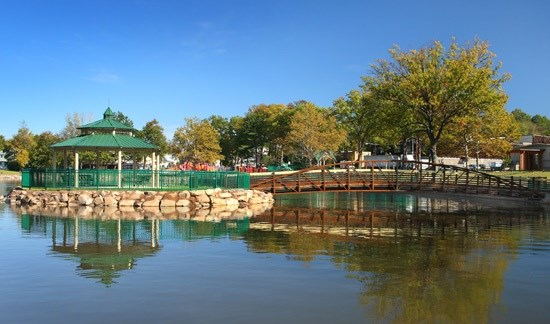
- Dahnert's Lake County Park, located in the center of the city

- Seal
- Nickname: "City of Champions"
- Location of Garfield in Bergen County highlighted in red (left). Inset map: Location of Bergen County in New Jersey highlighted in orange (right).

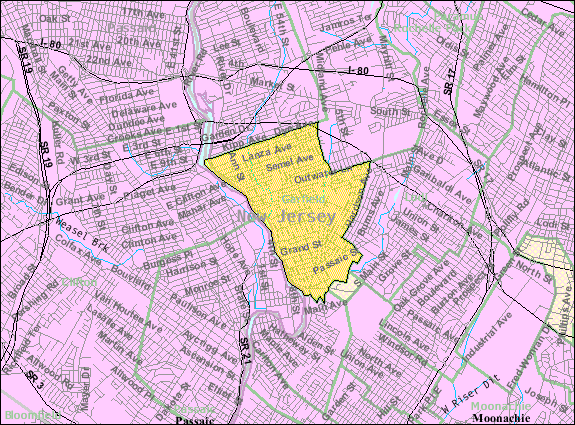
- Census Bureau map of Garfield, New Jersey

- Location in Bergen County Location in New Jersey Location in the United States
- Coordinates: 40.879797°N 74.10825°W
- Country: United States
- State: New Jersey
- County: Bergen
- Incorporated: March 15, 1898 (as Borough); April 19, 1917 (as City)
- Named for: James Garfield

Government
  - Type: 1923 Municipal Manager Law
  - Body: City Council
  - Mayor: Everett E. Garnto Jr. (R, term ends December 31, 2028)
  - Manager: Erin Nora Delaney
  - Municipal clerk: Erin Nora Delaney

Area
  - Total: 2.19 sq mi (5.67 km^{2})
  - Land: 2.11 sq mi (5.47 km^{2})
  - Water: 0.081 sq mi (0.21 km^{2}) 3.65%
  - Rank: 395th of 565 in state 45th of 70 in county
- Elevation: 98 ft (30 m)

Population (2020)
  - Total: 32,655
  - Estimate (2023): 32,456
  - Rank: 71st of 565 in state 5th of 70 in county
  - Density: 15,469/sq mi (5,973/km^{2})
  - Rank: 18th of 565 in state 5th of 70 in county
- Time zone: UTC−05:00 (Eastern (EST))
  - Summer (DST): UTC−04:00 (Eastern (EDT))
- ZIP Code: 07026
- Area code: 973
- FIPS code: 3400325770
- GNIS feature ID: 0876557
- Website: www.garfieldnj.org

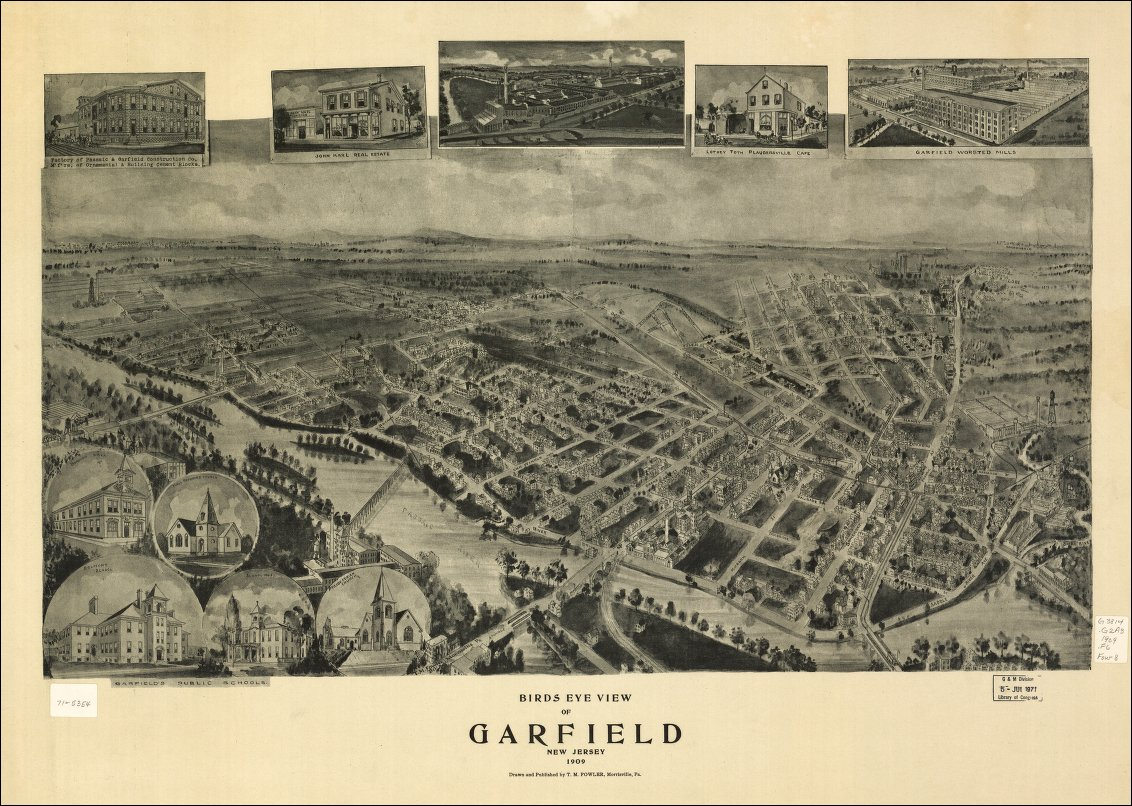
Bird's-eye view of Garfield New Jersey, image from memory.loc.gov

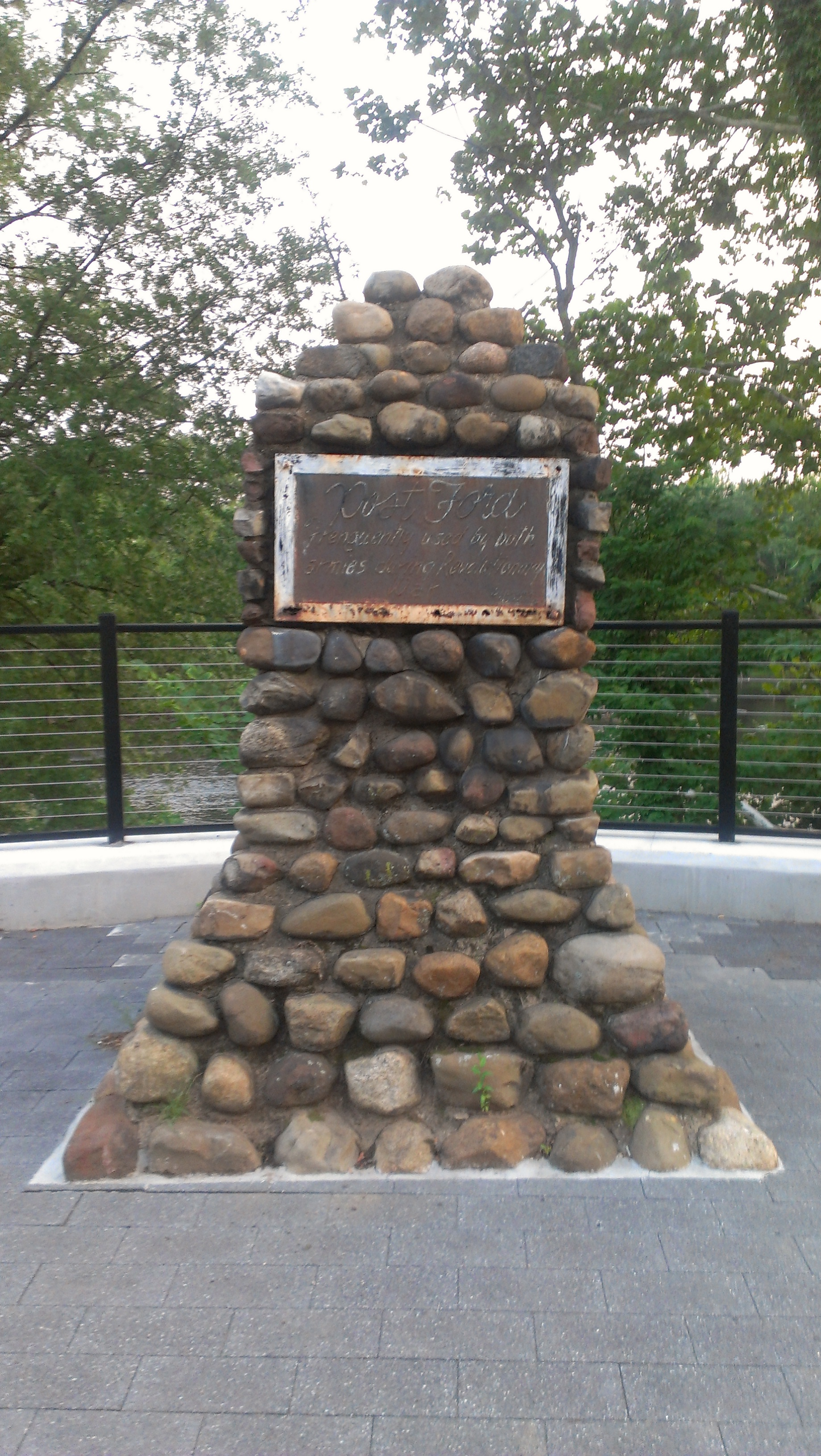
Post Ford at River Drive and Columbus Avenue – Revolutionary War Monument

Garfield is a city in Bergen County in the U.S. state of New Jersey. As of the 2020 United States census, the city's population was 32,655, an increase of 2,168 (+7.1%) from the 2010 census count of 30,487, which in turn reflected an increase of 701 (+2.4%) from the 29,786 counted in the 2000 census.

== History ==
Long the home of the Lenape, Native Americans, European settlement in the area that would become Garfield dates back to 1679, when Jacques Cortelyou acquired more than 5,000 acres (2,000 ha) of land surrounding the Passaic River known as "Acqueyquinonke", that ran from the Saddle River to present day Glen Rock.

When the area that is now Garfield was first developed in 1873 with an initial group of seven homes constructed by Gilbert D. Bogart, it was known as East Passaic.

In 1881, the community's name was changed to Garfield in honor of President of the United States James Garfield. There are two explanations given for the circumstances behind the renaming. According to one, shortly after Garfield was elected to the presidency the founder of East Passaic said, "tell everyone...don't speak of East Passaic anymore; call it 'Garfield' after the man who will lead this great country to prosperity." Seven months later, President Garfield was assassinated but his name remained with the community. The second theory holds that after Garfield's death in 1881, a new train station was named in his honor, which in turn led to the surrounding area becoming associated with his name as well.

Garfield was originally incorporated as a borough on March 15, 1898, from portions of Saddle River Township and Wallington. At the time, the New Jersey Legislature set Garfield's boundaries as they exist today. On April 19, 1917, the borough became the City of Garfield, based on the results of a referendum held two days earlier.

== Geography ==
According to the United States Census Bureau, the city had a total area of 2.19 square miles (5.67 km^{2}), including 2.11 square miles (5.47 km^{2}) of land and 0.08 square miles (0.21 km^{2}) of water (3.65%).

Unincorporated communities, localities and place names located partially or completely within the township include Belmont, Bogart Heights, Dundee Dam and Plauderville.

The city has land borders with adjacent Elmwood Park, Lodi, Saddle Brook and South Hackensack. The Saddle River is a shared border with Wallington. There are three bridges over the Passaic River crossing the municipal and county line to Passaic and Clifton in Passaic County.

=== Environment ===
The United States Environmental Protection Agency has identified Garfield as the site of groundwater contaminated hexavalent chromium from a spill in 1983 at the E.C. Electroplating Corporation site. In 2016, the EPA announced a $37 million project to cleanup contamination at the site using Superfund money, as the company responsible for the spill of 3,600 US gallons (14,000 L; 3,000 imp gal) of chromic acid is no longer in business.

== Demographics ==
Historical population
Census	Pop.	Note	%±
1890	1,028		—
1900	3,504		240.9%
1910	10,213		191.5%
1920	19,381		89.8%
1930	29,739		53.4%
1940	28,044		−5.7%
1950	27,550		−1.8%
1960	29,253		6.2%
1970	30,797		5.3%
1980	26,803		−13.0%
1990	26,727		−0.3%
2000	29,786		11.4%
2010	30,487		2.4%
2020	32,655		7.1%
2023 (est.)	32,456		−0.6%
Population sources: 1890–1920 1880–1890; 1890–1930 1900–2020; 2000; 2010 2020

Based on data from the 2011–2015 American Community Survey, the city had a median age of 35.4, the lowest median age in the county. Garfield was one of four municipalities with a median age below the national and state average of 37.6, and well below the median age of 41.5 in Bergen County.

The borough is also home to the architecturally prominent Russian Orthodox Church of Three Saints, which serves the growing Ukrainian American community in western Bergen County.

=== Racial and ethnic composition ===
Garfield city, New Jersey – Racial and ethnic composition Note: the US Census treats Hispanic/Latino as an ethnic category. This table excludes Latinos from the racial categories and assigns them to a separate category. Hispanics/Latinos may be of any race.
Race / Ethnicity (NH = Non-Hispanic)	Pop 2000	Pop 2010	Pop 2020	% 2000	% 2010	% 2020
White alone (NH)	21,560	17,972	16,398	72.38%	58.95%	50.22%
Black or African American alone (NH)	778	1,564	1,684	2.61%	5.13%	5.16%
Native American or Alaska Native alone (NH)	40	16	48	0.13%	0.05%	0.15%
Asian alone (NH)	787	659	985	2.64%	2.16%	3.02%
Native Hawaiian or Pacific Islander alone (NH)	1	2	3	0.00%	0.01%	0.01%
Other race alone (NH)	36	104	225	0.12%	0.34%	0.69%
Mixed race or Multiracial (NH)	595	340	531	2.00%	1.12%	1.63%
Hispanic or Latino (any race)	5,989	9,830	12,781	20.11%	32.24%	39.14%
Total	29,786	30,487	32,655	100.00%	100.00%	100.00%

=== 2020 census ===
As of the 2020 census, Garfield had a population of 32,655. The median age was 36.6 years. 22.7% of residents were under the age of 18 and 12.8% of residents were 65 years of age or older. For every 100 females there were 91.2 males, and for every 100 females age 18 and over there were 89.2 males age 18 and over.

100.0% of residents lived in urban areas, while 0.0% lived in rural areas.

There were 11,773 households in Garfield, of which 35.5% had children under the age of 18 living in them. Of all households, 42.7% were married-couple households, 19.5% were households with a male householder and no spouse or partner present, and 30.9% were households with a female householder and no spouse or partner present. About 24.0% of all households were made up of individuals and 9.3% had someone living alone who was 65 years of age or older.

There were 12,407 housing units, of which 5.1% were vacant. The homeowner vacancy rate was 1.4% and the rental vacancy rate was 3.8%.

Racial composition as of the 2020 census
Race	Number	Percent
White	18,231	55.8%
Black or African American	2,029	6.2%
American Indian and Alaska Native	273	0.8%
Asian	1,039	3.2%
Native Hawaiian and Other Pacific Islander	13	0.0%
Some other race	6,963	21.3%
Two or more races	4,107	12.6%
Hispanic or Latino (of any race)	12,781	39.1%

=== 2010 census ===
The 2010 United States census counted 30,487 people, 11,073 households, and 7,718 families in the city. The population density was 14,524.8 per square mile (5,608.1/km^{2}). There were 11,788 housing units at an average density of 5,616.1 per square mile (2,168.4/km^{2}). The racial makeup was 76.73% (23,393) White, 6.50% (1,981) Black or African American, 0.43% (132) Native American, 2.22% (678) Asian, 0.01% (2) Pacific Islander, 10.85% (3,307) from other races, and 3.26% (994) from two or more races. Hispanic or Latino of any race were 32.24% (9,830) of the population.

Of the 11,073 households, 33.4% had children under the age of 18; 45.2% were married couples living together; 17.8% had a female householder with no husband present and 30.3% were non-families. Of all households, 24.7% were made up of individuals and 9.8% had someone living alone who was 65 years of age or older. The average household size was 2.75 and the average family size was 3.29.

23.3% of the population were under the age of 18, 9.2% from 18 to 24, 30.9% from 25 to 44, 25.4% from 45 to 64, and 11.2% who were 65 years of age or older. The median age was 35.5 years. For every 100 females, the population had 91.3 males. For every 100 females ages 18 and older there were 89.0 males.

The Census Bureau's 2006–2010 American Community Survey showed that (in 2010 inflation-adjusted dollars) median household income was $51,407 (with a margin of error of +/− $1,842) and the median family income was $56,701 (+/− $5,020). Males had a median income of $42,927 (+/− $1,953) versus $33,231 (+/− $3,471) for females. The per capita income for the city was $24,022 (+/− $1,348). About 9.8% of families and 13.0% of the population were below the poverty line, including 23.0% of those under age 18 and 16.2% of ages 65 years or over.

Same-sex couples headed 68 households in 2010.

=== 2000 census ===
As of the 2000 United States census there were 29,786 people, 11,250 households, and 7,425 families residing in the city. The population density was 13,976.0 inhabitants per square mile (5,396.2/km^{2}). There were 11,698 housing units at an average density of 5,488.8 per square mile (2,119.2/km^{2}). The racial makeup of the city was 82.11% White, 2.98% African American, 0.33% Native American, 2.69% Asian, 0.01% Pacific Islander, 8.10% from other races, and 3.79% from two or more races. Hispanic or Latino of any race were 20.11% of the population.

There were 11,250 households, out of which 30.5% had children under the age of 18 living with them, 46.5% were married couples living together, 13.8% had a female householder with no husband present, and 34.0% were non-families. 27.4% of all households were made up of individuals, and 12.2% had someone living alone who was 65 years of age or older. The average household size was 2.64 and the average family size was 3.26.

In the city the age distribution of the population shows 22.4% under the age of 18, 9.6% from 18 to 24, 33.2% from 25 to 44, 20.8% from 45 to 64, and 14.1% who were 65 years of age or older. The median age was 36 years. For every 100 females, there were 95.0 males. For every 100 females age 18 and over, there were 92.0 males.

The median income for a household in the city was $42,748, and the median income for a family was $51,654. Males had a median income of $35,987 versus $26,896 for females. The per capita income for the city was $19,530. About 6.4% of families and 7.8% of the population were below the poverty line, including 9.1% of those under age 18 and 8.1% of those age 65 or over.

As of the 2000 Census, an adjusted 22.9% of Garfield's population reported Polish ancestry, ranked third highest in New Jersey behind Manville (23.1%) and neighboring Wallington (45.5%).

== Government ==
=== Local government ===
The City of Garfield operates under the 1923 Municipal Manager Law of New Jersey municipal government, with a governing body comprised of a five-member Council, who appoint a City Manager. Council members are elected at-large in non-partisan elections to serve four-year terms on a concurrent basis. The city is one of seven municipalities (of the 564) statewide that use this form of government. In November 2015, following a referendum that supported the move by a 3-1 margin, the City Council voted to shift the city's municipal elections from May to November, citing hopes for greater voter participation and potential savings of $50,000 for each election; the shift result in the extension of terms for the then-serving council and municipal manager by six months, to the end of December 2016. The most recent municipal election was held on November 8, 2016, together with the presidential election.

At a reorganization meeting held after each election, the Council selects one of its members to be the Mayor and another to serve as Deputy Mayor. The day-to-day operation of the city is carried out under the supervision of the appointed department heads, who report to the City Manager.

As of 2025, members of the Garfield City Council are Mayor Everett E. Garnto Jr., Deputy Mayor Kevin Kane, Deputy Mayor Tana Raymond, Joseph Delaney and Richard Rigoglioso, all serving concurrent terms of office that end December 31, 2028.

In July 2021, the city council appointed Alejandina Banch to fill the council seat that had been held by Erin Nora Delaney until she stepped down to take office as the city manager / clerk, succeeding Thomas Duch, who had been appointed as the administrator of Bergen County. Banch served on an interim basis until the November 2021 general election, when she was elected to serve the balance of the term of office.

=== Federal, state and county representation ===
Garfield is located in the 9th Congressional District and is part of New Jersey's 35th state legislative district.

For the 119th United States Congress, New Jersey's 9th congressional district is represented by Nellie Pou (D, North Haledon) New Jersey is represented in the United States Senate by Democrats Cory Booker (Newark, term ends 2027) and Andy Kim (Moorestown, term ends 2031).

For the 2026–2027 session, the 35th legislative district of the New Jersey Legislature is represented in the State Senate by Benjie Wimberly (D, Paterson) and in the General Assembly by Al Abdelaziz (D, Paterson) and Kenyatta Stewart (D, Paterson).

Bergen County is governed by a directly elected County Executive, with legislative functions performed by a Board of County Commissioners comprised of seven members who are elected at-large to three-year terms in partisan elections on a staggered basis, with either two or three seats coming up for election each November; a Chairman and Vice Chairman are selected from among its seven members at a reorganization meeting held every January. As of 2025, the county executive is James J. Tedesco III (D, Paramus), whose four-year term of office ends December 31, 2026.

Bergen County's Commissioners are Chair Mary J. Amoroso (D, Mahwah, 2025), Vice Chair Steven A. Tanelli (D, North Arlington, 2027), Chair Pro Tem Joan Voss (D, Fort Lee, 2026), Rafael Marte (D, Bergenfield, 2026), Germaine M. Ortiz (D, Emerson, 2025), Thomas J. Sullivan Jr. (D, Montvale, 2025) and Tracy Silna Zur (D, Franklin Lakes, 2027).

Bergen County's elected constitutional officials are Clerk John S. Hogan (D, Northvale, 2026), Sheriff Anthony Cureton (D, Englewood, 2027) and Surrogate Michael R. Dressler (D, Cresskill, 2026).

=== Politics ===
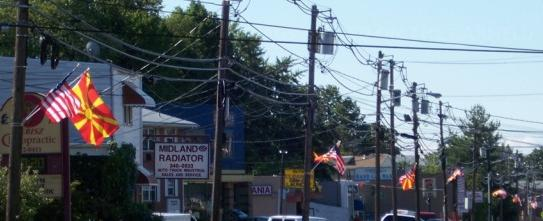
Macedonian and American flags on the streets in Garfield, New Jersey on Macedonian Independence Day.

As of March 2011, there were a total of 11,904 registered voters in Garfield, of which 3,958 (33.2% vs. 31.7% countywide) were registered as Democrats, 1,395 (11.7% vs. 21.1%) were registered as Republicans and 6,541 (54.9% vs. 47.1%) were registered as Unaffiliated. There were 10 voters registered as Libertarians or Greens. Among the city's 2010 Census population, 39.0% (vs. 57.1% in Bergen County) were registered to vote, including 50.9% of those ages 18 and over (vs. 73.7% countywide).

Gubernatorial election results for Garfield
Year	Republican		Democratic		Third party(ies)	
Year	No.	%	No.	%	No.	%
2025	2,596	39.20%	3,980	60.10%	46	0.69%
2021	2,332	48.03%	2,483	51.14%	40	0.82%
2017	1,167	33.75%	2,231	64.52%	60	1.74%
2013	1,960	50.41%	1,865	47.97%	63	1.62%
2009	1,796	40.32%	2,428	54.51%	230	5.16%
2005	1,543	33.06%	2,896	62.05%	228	4.89%

In the 2016 presidential election, Democrat Hillary Clinton received 5,477 votes (57.3% vs. 54.2% countywide), ahead of Republican Donald Trump with 3,782 votes (39.6% vs. 41.1%) and other candidates with 299 votes (3.1% vs. 4.6%), among the 9,690 ballots cast by the city's 14,816 registered voters, for a turnout of 65.4% (vs. 72.5% in Bergen County). In the 2012 presidential election, Democrat Barack Obama received 5,538 votes (67.1% vs. 54.8% countywide), ahead of Republican Mitt Romney with 2,540 votes (30.8% vs. 43.5%) and other candidates with 96 votes (1.2% vs. 0.9%), among the 8,256 ballots cast by the city's 13,183 registered voters, for a turnout of 62.6% (vs. 70.4% in Bergen County). In the 2008 presidential election, Democrat Barack Obama received 5,138 votes (59.7% vs. 53.9% countywide), ahead of Republican John McCain with 3,315 votes (38.5% vs. 44.5%) and other candidates with 68 votes (0.8% vs. 0.8%), among the 8,613 ballots cast by the city's 13,013 registered voters, for a turnout of 66.2% (vs. 76.8% in Bergen County). In the 2004 presidential election, Democrat John Kerry received 4,804 votes (57.8% vs. 51.7% countywide), ahead of Republican George W. Bush with 3,394 votes (40.9% vs. 47.2%) and other candidates with 66 votes (0.8% vs. 0.7%), among the 8,305 ballots cast by the city's 12,665 registered voters, for a turnout of 65.6% (vs. 76.9% in the whole county).

Presidential elections results
Year	Republican	Democratic
2024	52.5% 5,342	44.6% 4,537
2020	42.7% 4,761	55.9% 6,233
2016	39.6% 3,782	57.3% 5,477
2012	30.8% 2,540	67.1% 5,538
2008	38.5% 3,315	59.7% 5,138
2004	40.9% 3,394	57.8% 4,804

In the 2013 gubernatorial election, Republican Chris Christie received 50.4% of the vote (1,960 cast), ahead of Democrat Barbara Buono with 48.0% (1,865 votes), and other candidates with 1.6% (63 votes), among the 3,960 ballots cast by the city's 12,609 registered voters (72 ballots were spoiled), for a turnout of 31.4%. In the 2009 gubernatorial election, Democrat Jon Corzine received 2,428 ballots cast (54.1% vs. 48.0% countywide), ahead of Republican Chris Christie with 1,796 votes (40.0% vs. 45.8%), Independent Chris Daggett with 203 votes (4.5% vs. 4.7%) and other candidates with 27 votes (0.6% vs. 0.5%), among the 4,490 ballots cast by the city's 12,282 registered voters, yielding a 36.6% turnout (vs. 50.0% in the county).

United States Senate election results for Garfield1
Year	Republican		Democratic		Third party(ies)	
Year	No.	%	No.	%	No.	%
2024	4,122	47.07%	4,175	47.67%	461	5.26%
2018	2,063	34.98%	3,603	61.10%	231	3.92%
2012	1,941	27.51%	4,889	69.29%	226	3.20%
2006	1,476	35.33%	2,636	63.09%	66	1.58%

United States Senate election results for Garfield2
Year	Republican		Democratic		Third party(ies)	
Year	No.	%	No.	%	No.	%
2020	3,914	37.19%	6,265	59.53%	345	3.28%
2014	1,077	32.88%	2,122	64.77%	77	2.35%
2013	893	39.72%	1,316	58.54%	39	1.73%
2008	2,308	33.01%	4,537	64.90%	146	2.09%

== Education ==
The Garfield Public Schools serve students in pre-kindergarten through twelfth grade. The district is one of 31 former Abbott districts statewide that were established pursuant to the decision by the New Jersey Supreme Court in Abbott v. Burke which are now referred to as "SDA Districts" based on the requirement for the state to cover all costs for school building and renovation projects in these districts under the supervision of the New Jersey Schools Development Authority.

As of the 2020–21 school year, the district, comprised of 12 schools, had an enrollment of 4,713 students and 438.1 classroom teachers (on an FTE basis), for a student–teacher ratio of 10.8:1. Schools in the district (with 2020–21 enrollment data from the National Center for Education Statistics) are Garfield Early Childhood Learning Center (178 students; in Pre-K), Garfield Public Preschool Annex (95; Pre-K), Garfield Public Preschool Annex 3 (159; Pre-K), Washington Irving School #4 (382; K–5), Woodrow Wilson School #5 (280; K–5), Abraham Lincoln Elementary School #6 (365; Pre-K–5), Theodore Roosevelt School #7 (273; K–5), Christopher Columbus School #8 (306; K–5), Thomas Jefferson School #9 (295; K–5), James Madison School #10 (245; K–5), Garfield Middle School (989; 6–8) and Garfield High School (1,159; 9–12).

Public school students from the city, and all of Bergen County, are eligible to attend the secondary education programs offered by the Bergen County Technical Schools, which include the Bergen County Academies in Hackensack, and the Bergen Tech campus in Teterboro or Paramus. The district offers programs on a shared-time or full-time basis, with admission based on a selective application process and tuition covered by the student's home school district.

Bergen Arts and Science Charter School, which opened in September 2006, serves public school students in the district, as well as those from Hackensack and Lodi. The elementary (grades K–3) and middle (4–8) school facilities are located in Garfield, while the high school (9–12) is in Hackensack. As of the 2018–19 school year, the charter school had an enrollment of 1,163 students and 83.0 classroom teachers (on an FTE basis), for a student–teacher ratio of 14.0:1.

== Emergency services ==
=== Police ===
The Garfield Police Department (GPD) provides emergency and protective services to the city of Garfield. The GPD consists of 66 sworn officers.

=== Fire ===
The Garfield Fire Department (GFD) is a fully volunteer fire department. The GFD was organized on July 17, 1893. The department is staffed by 150 fully trained firefighters operating out of five firehouses. The department has three engine companies, one rescue engine company and one ladder(tiller) company. In addition they have a hazardous materials unit, a water rescue boat and a foam tender.

== Transportation ==
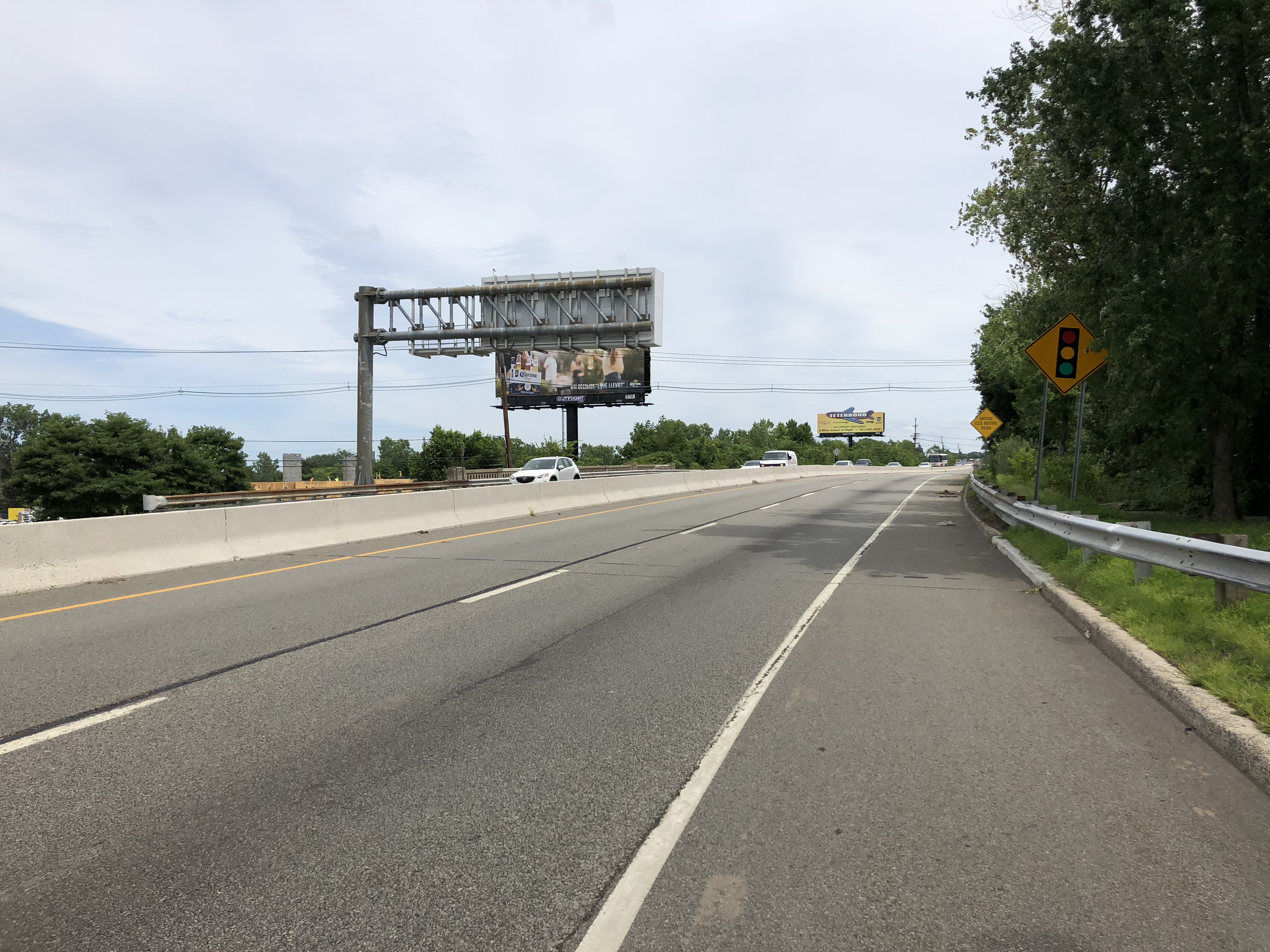
U.S. Route 46 eastbound in Garfield

=== Roads and highways ===
As of May 2010, the city had a total of 49.24 miles (79.24 km) of roadways, of which 42.67 miles (68.67 km) were maintained by the municipality, 6.44 miles (10.36 km) by Bergen County and 0.13 miles (0.21 km) by the New Jersey Department of Transportation.

U.S. Route 46 and County Route 507 pass through Garfield. Other main roads include Midland Avenue, Outwater Lane, River Drive and Passaic Street. There are five crossings of the Lower Passaic River.

=== Public transportation ===
Both the Garfield station and the Plauderville station, located on the Saddle Brook border, are served by NJ Transit's Bergen County Line, providing service to Hoboken Terminal, with transfers available at Secaucus Junction to Penn Station in Midtown Manhattan and to most of NJ Transit's other train lines.

NJ Transit buses serving Garfield include routes 160 and 161 serving the Port Authority Bus Terminal in Midtown Manhattan, and local service on routes 702, 707, 709 and 758.

== Notable people ==
People who were born in, residents of, or otherwise closely associated with Garfield include:

- Tony Aless (1921–1988), jazz pianist
- Joyce Arleen (1931–2023), actress
- Miles Austin (born 1984), wide receiver for the Dallas Cowboys
- Joe Benigno (born 1953), sports radio personality on WFAN
- Joan Berger (1933–2021), infielder and outfielder who played for the Rockford Peaches in the All-American Girls Professional Baseball League
- Al Blozis (1919–1945), player for the New York Giants killed during World War II
- Linda Bove (born 1945), deaf actress who played the part of Linda the Librarian on the children's television program Sesame Street from 1971 to 2003
- David Brigati (born 1940), original member of Joey Dee and the Starliters and backing singer for The Rascals
- Eddie Brigati (born 1945), singer/songwriter, founding member of The Rascals
- Luis Castillo (born 1983), defensive end for the San Diego Chargers
- Wayne Chrebet (born 1973), wide receiver who played for the New York Jets
- Mickey Deans (1934–2003), musician, fifth husband of Judy Garland
- Thomas J. Duch (born 1956), former mayor of Garfield who served in the New Jersey General Assembly and was appointed as Bergen County administrator
- Peter C. Eagler (1954–2024), politician who represented the 34th legislative district in the New Jersey General Assembly from 2002 to 2006
- Gordon Hollingshead (1892–1952), movie producer who won six Academy Awards, including for the 1945 short film Star in the Night
- Otto Huber (1914–1989), Major League Baseball player who played for the Boston Bees during the 1939 season
- Gianfranco Iannotta (born 1994), track and field athlete who won a gold medal at the 2016 Summer Paralympics
- Dennis Joel (1947-2006), former child actor and singer
- Isaac M. Laddon (1894–1976), aircraft designer
- Tippy Larkin (1911–1992), boxer
- Michael J. Pollard (1939–2019), character actor and comedian widely known for his role as C.W. Moss in the film Bonnie and Clyde (1967), for which he received an Academy Award for Best Supporting Actor nomination
- Gorgi Popstefanov (born 1987), Macedonian road racing cyclist
- Janice Robinson (born 1967), singer, solo and with Livin' Joy
- Paul L. Troast (1894–1972), building contractor, chairman of the New Jersey Turnpike Authority during its construction, and one-time failed gubernatorial candidate in 1953
- Joseph Villa (1948–1995), pianist
- Richard F. Visotcky (1929–2002), politician who served as mayor of Garfield for six terms was a member of the New Jersey General Assembly

== Sources ==
- Municipal Incorporations of the State of New Jersey (according to Counties) prepared by the Division of Local Government, Department of the Treasury (New Jersey); December 1, 1958.
- Clayton, W. Woodford; and Nelson, Nelson. History of Bergen and Passaic Counties, New Jersey, with Biographical Sketches of Many of its Pioneers and Prominent Men. Philadelphia: Everts and Peck, 1882.
- Harvey, Cornelius Burnham (ed.), Genealogical History of Hudson and Bergen Counties, New Jersey. New York: New Jersey Genealogical Publishing Co., 1900.
- Van Valen, James M. History of Bergen County, New Jersey. New York: New Jersey Publishing and Engraving Co., 1900.
- Westervelt, Frances A. (Frances Augusta), 1858–1942, History of Bergen County, New Jersey, 1630–1923, Lewis Historical Publishing Company, 1923.
