= Music of Florida =

The music of Florida has diverse influences, with roots in rock, jazz, blues, country, and Latin music. Cities such as Tampa, Gainesville, Orlando, and Miami developed influential rock, punk, and metal scenes in the 1970s–2000s. Miami in particular has a rich tradition of Latin and Caribbean music, which has influenced mainstream pop and hip hop in the 2000s and 2010s.

== Blues ==
Blues artists from Florida include Piedmont blues singer and guitarist Gabriel Brown and saxophonist and blues shouter Buster Bennett. Some blues songs from the early 20th century reference geographic locations in Florida, including "Florida Blues" by W. C. Handy, "Jacksonville Blues", "Miami Blues", "Miami Beach Blues", "Swanee Blues", and "Pensacola Blues".

== Jazz ==
Bebop drummer Robert Thomas, Jr. and swing drummer Panama Francis were born in Miami. Saxophonist Archie Shepp was born in Fort Lauderdale. Trumpeter Fats Navarro was born in Key West. Bassist, cellist, and composer Sam Jones was born in Jacksonville. Alto saxophonist Cannonball Adderley and his brother, the cornet and trumpet player Nat Adderley, of Tampa, and tenor saxophonist Junior Cook of Pensacola were active in the hard bop era. Multi-instrumentalist and composer Gigi Gryce and blues and jazz singer and pianist Ida Goodson were also born in Pensacola. Pianist and singer Billie Pierce, of the Goodson Sisters, was born in Marianna. Trombonist Buster Cooper was born in St. Petersburg. Saxophonist Alfred "Pee Wee" Ellis was born in Bradenton. Doug Carn of St. Augustine recorded several albums for Black Jazz Records in the early 1970s.

Trumpeter Pete Minger, a South Carolina native, moved to Florida where he played with drummer William Peeples among others, and studied music at the University of Miami after working with Count Basie in the 1970s. Cuban jazz trumpeter, pianist, and composer Arturo Sandoval has been active in Miami since 1990.

Dean Dewberry (1926–2006), a Jazz (American Music) Hall of Fame concert pianist, was born and raised in St. Petersburg. He played in local night clubs with his wife, Penny Parker Dewberry, as well as with jazz musicians such as Duke Ellington and Wild Bill Davidson. Later, after becoming Christians, both he and his wife created "Jazz For Jesus" and spent the rest of their working years uplifting inmates throughout the southeast; they did normal and home co-ministry with their friends Horace and Marilyn Ellsworth (ministers of "Looking Unto Jesus Ministries") throughout Florida and southern Georgia.

== Country ==
Florida is the home of several notable country musicians and musical acts. Johnny Tillotson ("Poetry in Motion") is from Jacksonville. Country singer Mel Tillis was born in Darby, a small rural community in Pasco County. His daughter Pam Tillis, also a country music star, was born in nearby Plant City. Slim Whitman was born in Tampa and once played minor-league baseball for the Plant City Berries.

The Bellamy Brothers, a duet act that hit number one on the country charts several times before reaching number one on the Billboard Hot 100 chart with their cross-over hit "Let Your Love Flow" (1976), also hail from Darby. Their close friend Bobby Braddock, a member of the Country Music Hall of Fame with multiple number ones to his credit, was born in Lakeland, in Polk County, and grew up in nearby Auburndale.

Jim Stafford, born in Eloise, grew up in Winter Haven and was a prominent country performer in the 1970s. He had his own television show, The Jim Stafford Show, in 1975, as well as co-hosting Those Amazing Animals with Burgess Meredith and Priscilla Presley and making regular guest appearances on The Tonight Show and other programs. Jake Owen had a number 4 album on the Billboard 200 in 2016.

== Rock ==
Florida has been a center for rock music and its numerous subgenres since the 1960s. Cities such as Tampa, Jacksonville, and Gainesville in particular developed active punk rock and metal scenes starting in the 1970s and 1980s.

Florida musicians inducted into the Rock and Roll Hall of Fame include The Allman Brothers Band, Tom Petty and the Heartbreakers, and Lynyrd Skynyrd (Ronnie Van Zant is buried in a suburb of Jacksonville; his widow founded Freebird Live).

=== Southern rock ===
In the 1970s and early 1980s, Jacksonville saw an active music recording scene with Southern rock bands such as Molly Hatchet, The Allman Brothers Band, 38 Special, Blackfoot, and Lynyrd Skynyrd. In the 1960s, Florida rock band The Outlaws was originated in Tampa;

=== Country rock ===
Gram Parsons is noted as being the founding father of Country rock in the 1960s. He was born in Winter Haven and attended exclusive The Bolles School in Jacksonville. He had a central role in the rock-and-roll scene of the 1960s, being friends or collaborating on projects with notables like Mick Jagger, Linda Ronstadt, Johnny "Guitar" Watson, and The Kingston Trio. He tried to rescue Michelle Phillips by helicopter from the mayhem at the Altamont Music Festival in 1969. One of his songs is included in Gimme Shelter, a documentary about the events at Altamont. Parsons was a member of The Byrds and was also part of The Flying Burrito Brothers. Later, with some friends from Harvard University, he formed a folk/country band named International Submarine Band. He later toured extensively with Emmylou Harris before his death at the age of 26.

=== Mainstream rock ===
Scott McKenzie (left there as an infant) and Gary U.S. Bonds were born in Florida. The Royal Guardsmen ("Snoopy vs. the Red Baron" ranked number 2 on the Hot 100 in 1966) from Ocala; and the Classics IV ("Traces" ranked number 2 on the Billboard Hot 100 in 1969) from Jacksonville. Tropical country singer Bertie Higgins ("Key Largo", 1981) was inducted into the Florida Music Hall of Fame in 2016.

Jim Morrison of The Doors was born in Melbourne, spent part of his childhood in Clearwater, and attended Florida State University for a few years.

Kent Lavoie, better known by his stage name Lobo, hit number 5 on the Billboard Pop chart in 1971 with the soft rock song "Me and You and a Dog Named Boo". He was born in Tallahassee and grew up in Winter Haven. While attending the University of South Florida, Lavoie formed a band called The Rumors with Jim Stafford and Gram Parsons.

Guitarist Tom Petty was born in and grew up in Gainesville. Most of the members of the three bands he recorded with—The Epics, The Heartbreakers, and Mudcrutch—were also from Florida, mainly from in and around Gainesville and northern Florida. Tom Petty and the Heartbreakers had ten number one songs on the Mainstream Rock chart.

=== Alternative rock ===
Bands of the mid-to late-1990s with strong links to Florida include Tabitha's Secret (later named Matchbox Twenty) from Orlando, the rock band Creed (who had four number one songs on the Mainstream Rock chart) from Tallahassee, and Sister Hazel from Gainesville. The rock band, The Freddy Mitchell Euphoria (formed in Fort Lauderdale in the 1980s) released, "Above and Below" (1984), "Fallen Moons" (1998) and "Animator" (2005). Alter Bridge (Creed minus lead vocalist Scott Stapp) from Orlando had a number 5 album on the Billboard 200 with One Day Remains (2004).

The Tropics and The Tempests are from Tampa. Chris Carrabba and his band, Dashboard Confessional, is usually associated with the new wave of popular alternative music. Originating from Boca Raton, the band had two number 2 albums on the Billboard 200 in 2003 and 2006. Chris Carrabba graduated from Florida Atlantic University in Boca. His former band, Further Seems Forever, is also a popular indie rock band from Pompano Beach.

The band Saigon Kick from Coral Springs had a top 12 Billboard hit with "Love Is on the Way" (1992). Post-grunge band Seven Mary Three formed in Orlando.

The bands Shinedown, Cold ("Stupid Girl"), and Yellowcard formed in Jacksonville. Shinedown had a number 4 album on the Billboard 200 with Amaryllis (2012) and twelve number one songs on the Mainstream Rock Chart in the 2000s and 2010s, including "Second Chance" and "Sound of Madness".

Christian alternative band Tenth Avenue North is based out of West Palm Beach. Christian rock band Casting Crowns (Come to the Well, 2011) formed in Daytona Beach. Jani Lane, the original lead vocalist for Warrant, grew up in Winter Park; he later opened a club in downtown Orlando named Jani Lane's Sunset Strip. Todd LaTorre, the current vocalist for Queensrÿche, grew up in Tampa Bay; he also was the frontman of Crimson Glory.The American emo band Pool Kids formed in Tallahassee, Florida, in 2017. Their debut album was Music to Practice Safe Sex To (2018).

=== Rock recording industry ===
In the 1960s, Tampa was active in the music recording industry. Mercy recorded a Jack Sigler, Jr. original entitled "Love (Can Make You Happy)" at the old Charles Fuller Studio on MacDill Avenue in Tampa. The Royal Guardsmen recorded "Snoopy vs. The Red Baron" at this same studio. Many bands used Charles Fuller Studios for their 45 records. The Tropics, a Tampa/St. Petersburg-based band, recorded and released "I Want More" on the Knight label and "Time" on Columbia Records. The Tempests, a St. Petersburg-based band, recorded and released "I Want You Only" and "I Want You To Know" on the Fuller label.

Criteria Studios, a recording studio in Miami, produced Rumours (1977) by Fleetwood Mac and Hotel California (1976) by The Eagles.

=== Punk rock ===
Active punk rock scenes flourished in the Tampa/St. Petersburg area in the late 1970s, including bands such as The Straight Jackets, The Shades, the Jackers, Just Boys, The Art Holes, The Stick Figures, A New Personality, and the Veal Rifles.

Prior to moving to Los Angeles, Exene Cervenka lived in St. Petersburg and other locations in Central Florida during her teenage years.

Hardcore punk gained a widespread following, originating from cities like Gainesville, Fort Lauderdale, Miami, and Tampa. One of the first bands in this style is believed to be Roach Motel of Gainesville; however, The Eat, from Hialeah, formed around 1978–79. Miami also was home to one of the first American punk bands to release an indie single: "Silver Screen" (1978) by Critical Mass, which is still in demand by collectors today. Rat Cafeteria, U-Boats (Tampa); Sector 4, Hated Youth, and Paisley Death Camp (all from Tallahassee); No Fraud (Venice); F (Fort Lauderdale); Morbid Opera (Miami); and Crucial Truth (Pompano Beach) also gained an audience and some had songs compiled on the album We Can't Help It If We're From Florida.

In the 1980s, hardcore bands from Orlando included Dissent, Damage, Zyklon-B, The Bully Boys, Florida's Unwanted Children, Sewer Side Rouges, Declared Ungovernable, Contradiction, The Damn Maniacs, and Genitorturers. Mid-1980s-era band Black Label featured John Reece (future bassist for Rose Shadows) as well as Rusty Penrose (future bassist for Bully Boys) and John Stalzer on drums. Black Label was the second band to ever play at the Orlando concert venue Electric Avenue. The band's inaugural show brought in 981 people, a feat that would never again be accomplished by any local band at that venue. Black Label released one single, "Rootbeer For Everyone", a song that was in heavy rotation on Rollins College radio station WPRK, which was hosted at the time by future Genitorturers' front woman Jennifer Zimmerman.

Gainesville and Jacksonville had very active punk scenes in the 1990s and 2000s. Less Than Jake, Against Me!, and Hot Water Music are from Gainesville. The Red Jumpsuit Apparatus, Inspection 12, The Softer Side, and Evergreen Terrace are from Jacksonville. Mayday Parade and Stages & Stereos are from Tallahassee.

Other hardcore, post-hardcore, and metalcore bands from Florida include: Against All Authority, Anberlin "Feel Good Drag" (Stephen Christian graduated from UCF), Underoath, The Almost, Combatwoundedveteran, Poison the Well, Assholeparade, A Day to Remember (from Ocala), New Found Glory (from Coral Springs), Fake Problems (from Naples), and Shai Hulud. The bands Sleeping With Sirens and There for Tomorrow are from Orlando. The pop punk band We the Kings ("Check Yes Juliet", 2008) is from the Sarasota area.

=== Indie rock ===
Indie rock bands Mortimer Nova, Surfer Blood, Iron & Wine, Copeland, The Drums, and The Generators are from Florida. The post-rock band Windsor for the Derby was formed in Tampa, and Fake Problems originated in Naples.

=== Metal ===
Florida was the epicenter of the emerging death metal genre in the late 1980s, particularly in the Tampa Bay area. Shaped by the producers Scott Burns and Jim and Tim Morris of Morrisound Recording, the emergent Florida death metal scene produced artists such as Death, Morbid Angel, Deicide, Obituary, Atheist, Hate Eternal, Monstrosity, Assück, Nocturnus, Nasty Savage, and Acheron. The recording and commercial opportunities of the scene induced non-Floridian bands such as Cannibal Corpse and Malevolent Creation to relocate to Tampa. Among the records and albums produced at Morrisound were Deicide's debut album Deicide (1990), Morbid Angel's debut album Altars of Madness (1989), and Death's album Leprosy (1988). Tampa is also the birthplace of symphonic power metal band Kamelot and power metal band Iced Earth.

Fort Lauderdale has produced a few metal bands as well, such as Marilyn Manson, Monstrosity, Kult ov Azazel, and nu metal band Nonpoint. Progressive death metal bands Cynic, Hibernus Mortis, and I Set My Friends on Fire come from Miami. Poison the Well—the band generally agreed to have created the melodic metalcore subgenre, a type of metalcore inspired by melodic death metal—is also from Miami. Wage War and We Are Defiance are metalcore bands based out of Ocala.

Orlando is the home of the bands Death, Skrape, and Trivium. Savatage is from the city of Tarpon Springs; singer Jon Oliva went on to create the Trans-Siberian Orchestra from Tampa. Limp Bizkit is from Jacksonville.

== R&B, soul, funk, disco ==
TK Records produced the R&B group KC and the Sunshine Band along with soul singers Betty Wright (d.2020), George McCrae, Gwen McCrae, Timmy Thomas, Little Beaver, Foxy, Peter Brown, and Jimmy "Bo" Horne, as well as a number of soul and disco hits, many influenced by Caribbean music. KC and the Sunshine Band had many hits such as "Get Down Tonight", That's the Way", "Shake Your Booty", "Keep It Comin' Love" and "Boogie Shoes".

James & Bobby Purify, Eddie Hinton, Charles Bradley, and Sam Moore (Sam & Dave) were from Florida. Family soul singing group Cornelius Brothers & Sister Rose are from Dania. Soul singer Linda Lyndell was born in Gainesville. R&B artists Kirby Maurier was raised in Miami and Miramar, Sammie is from Boynton Beach and Pleasure P is from Carver Raches, West Park.

== Dance music ==
Floridian dance musicians include Jimmy Bo Horne and KC and the Sunshine Band. In 1985, the Winter Music Conference, an annual week-long dance music festival, started in Miami. It coincides with Ultra Music Festival.

Music from the 1990s included Murk (aka Funky Green Dogs), Planet Soul, No Mercy, and DJ Robbie Rivera.

== Pop ==
Florida pop musicians with at least one number one Billboard Hot 100 hit included KC and the Sunshine Band (5) in the 1970s; Terence Trent D'Arby and Exposé in the 1980s; Vanilla Ice and Stevie B in the 1990s; Rob Thomas, Matchbox 20, Creed, NSYNC, Enrique Iglesias "The King of Latin Pop" (2), T-Pain (2), Flo Rida (3), Sean Kingston, and Jason Derulo (2) in the 2000s; and Pitbull (2), Camila Cabello (2), XXXTentacion. And Ariana Grande with (9) in the 2010s and 2020s.

In addition, Florida musicians with at least one number one album on the Billboard 200 included Marilyn Manson (2), Limp Bizkit (2), and Backstreet Boys (3) in the 1990s; R&B/hip hop group Pretty Ricky, and rapper Rick Ross (5) in the 2000s; and Tom Petty and the Heartbreakers, R&B/pop singer Ariana Grande (6), bro-country duo Florida Georgia Line, rapper DJ Khaled (4), and rapper Kodak Black in the 2010s.

Backstreet Boys, NSYNC, and O-Town were all formed in Orlando and managed by Lou Pearlman. Additional musicians from Orlando include singer and actress Mandy Moore, and country singer John Anderson ("Seminole Wind", 1992). Aaron Carter was from Tampa, and had a number 4 album on Billboard 200 in 2000.

Additional musicians from Florida include electro-pop singer, multi-instrumentalist, and producer Meresha; country pop singer Cassadee Pope from West Palm Beach; and neotraditional country singer Easton Corbin from the Gainesville area. Pop rapper LunchMoney Lewis, rapper Kent Jones all come from Miami. EDM and trap DJ Diplo (also in Major Lazer and Jack Ü) is also from Miami.

Early 2000s girl group P.Y.T. and dance-pop singer Willa Ford came from the Tampa area. The girl group Fifth Harmony (with Camila Cabello, who later went solo) is from Miami, and had a number 4 album on the Billboard 200 with 7/27 (2016).

== Latin music ==
There are many Latinos in Florida, and an especially high number of Cubans in cities such as Miami and Tampa. The regional Latin music industry includes a wide variety of traditional and popular Cuban styles, as well as other Latin music genres. The Cuban community has produced traditional performers including Cachao and Israel Kantor, as well as mainstream pop stars such as Gloria Estefan, the "Queen of Latin Pop". In the 1980s, Gloria Estefan and Miami Sound Machine had three number one Hot 100 hits, including "Anything for You". Estefan is the most famous musician to come from the Miami pop industry; others include Willie Chirino and Albita Rodríguez. Jon Secada had the hit "Just Another Day" in 1992 and was from the Miami area.

In 2017, the music video for "Despacito" by Luis Fonsi featuring Daddy Yankee reached over a billion views on YouTube in under 3 months. Luis Fonsi went to high school in Orlando and attended Florida State. As of December 2020, the music video was the second most viewed YouTube video of all time. With 3.3 million certified sales plus track-equivalent streams, "Despacito" became one of the best-selling Latin singles in the United States. Reggaeton artist Bad Bunny's (from Puerto Rico) album X 100pre (2018) was ranked number 447 on Rolling Stone's 500 Greatest Albums of All Time list in 2020.

== Hip hop music ==
=== Miami Bass ===
Miami bass is a booming, bass-heavy hip-hop music that developed in the mid-1980s in Miami. Innovators on the scene included DJ Laz, while the scene eventually gained prominence through the Miami bass group 2 Live Crew led by Luther Campbell. The lyrics to Miami bass were often sexually explicit, and when 2 Live Crew began to achieve national attention, the words in their songs caused controversy; several stores were prosecuted under obscenity laws for selling the disc, and members of 2 Live Crew were arrested for performing songs from the album As Nasty As They Wanna Be.

The Miami bass groups 69 Boyz ("Tootsee Roll", 1994) and Quad City DJs ("C'mon N' Ride It (The Train)", 1996) come from Jacksonville.

=== The Memphis rap, Crunk and Trap music influence in the Florida rap ===
Nappy Boy Entertainment is a record label founded by T-Pain in Tallahassee. Valholla Entertainment is a Miami-based label and management company.

Raider Klan was a hip-hop collective formed in Carol City in 2008 by SpaceGhostPurrp, Dough Dough Da Don, Kadafi, Muney Junior, and Jitt. They were one of the first rap collectives to integrate the style of early-Three 6 Mafia into their music, a pattern subsequently embraced throughout the hip-hop scene, namely in the form of ASAP Mob and Drake. Raider Klan members and affiliates Denzel Curry, Chris Travis and Xavier Wulf pioneered the Soundcloud rap movement.

Subsequent Florida rappers XXXTentacion, Ski Mask the Slump God, Lil Pump, Smokepurpp, and Wifisfuneral brought SoundCloud rap to the mainstream in the mid-to-late-2010s. During this period, XXXTentacion helped to define the sound of emo rap. XXXTentacion was killed in Broward county in 2018 at age 20 after attempting to purchase a motorcycle.

Additional Floridian rappers include Trick Daddy, Kodak Black, Denzel Curry, Rick Ross, Ace Hood, Plies, Trina, Rod Wave, Cool & Dre, Flo Rida, Jacki-O, stic.man, Dead Prez, Pitbull, YNW Melly, BossMan Dlow, and M-1.

== Florida ska ==
With most American bands surfacing during the third wave in the early 1990s; some of Florida's earliest ska bands like Magadog and Less than Jake paved the way for subsequent bands such as:

Pork Pie Tribe, Pie Tasters, Skiff Dank, the Usuals, Skahumbug, Baccone Dolce and the Rugcutters.

== Florida breaks ==
Florida breaks is a genre of breakbeat music originating in the 1990s in the state of Florida. It is particularly popular in the Tampa and Orlando areas.

== See also ==
- Music of Miami
- List of songs about Miami
- Florida Artists Hall of Fame
