= Antithesis (disambiguation) =

Antithesis, in rhetoric, is a counter-proposition that denotes a direct contrast to the original proposition.

Antithesis may also refer to:

- Antithesis (Netherlands), a political conflict in Dutch history
- Antithesis (Origin album)
- Antithesis (Gypsy album)
