= B.L.T. (album) =

Studio album by Robin Trower, Jack Bruce and Bill Lordan
- Released: February 1981
- Studio: Konk, London
- Genre: Blues rock
- Length: 37:13
- Label: Chrysalis/Capitol
- Producer: Robin Trower

Robin Trower chronology
Victims of the Fury (1980)	B.L.T. (1981)	Truce (1982)

Jack Bruce chronology
I've Always Wanted To Do This (1980)	B.L.T. (1981)	Truce (1982)

Professional ratings
Review scores
Source	Rating
AllMusic	3/5 stars
The Rolling Stone Album Guide	3/5 stars

B.L.T. is a 1981 album by Robin Trower (formerly of Procol Harum), Jack Bruce (formerly of Cream) and Bill Lordan (former drummer of Sly and the Family Stone, the Robin Trower Band and Gypsy). This is the first Robin Trower album to feature Jack Bruce on bass and vocals and the last to feature Bill Lordan on drums. It reached number 37 on the Billboard 200 in May 1981.

== Track listing ==
All tracks composed by Robin Trower and Keith Reid, except where indicated.

Side one
No.	Title	Writer(s)	Length
1.	"Into Money"	Robin Trower	2:53
2.	"What It Is"		3:21
3.	"Won't Let You Down"		4:22
4.	"No Island Lost"	James Dewar, Robin Trower	3:48
5.	"It's Too Late"		3:38
Total length:			18:02

Side two
No.	Title	Writer(s)	Length
6.	"Life on Earth"	Jack Bruce	3:38
7.	"Once the Bird Has Flown"		3:56
8.	"Carmen"		3:37
9.	"Feel the Heat"		2:50
10.	"End Game"		5:10
Total length:			19:11

== Personnel ==
- Robin Trower – guitar, producer
- Jack Bruce – bass, guitar, keyboards, vocals
- Bill Lordan – drums

Technical

- Mike Januszkiewicz – assistant producer
- Ben Fenner – engineer, recorder, mixer
- Stephan Galfas – engineer, all Jack Bruce's vocals, except for "Won't Let You Down" and "End Game"
- Peter Wagg – art direction
- Trevor Key – photography

== Charts ==
Chart (1981)	Peak position
Australia (Kent Music Report)	100
United States (Billboard 200)	37
