= Alhambra Orchestra =

Community orchestra in Miami, Florida, U.S.

- community orchestra
- Founded: 1990 (36 years ago) (by Dr. Leo Walz)
- Location: Miami, Florida, U.S.
- Principal conductor: Daniel Andai
- Website: alhambramusic.org

The Alhambra Orchestra is a community philharmonic based in Miami, Florida, United States.

== History and operations ==
Founded in 1990 by Dr. Leo Walz, the orchestra presents approximately seven major concerts per season, free or with minimal admission costs, as well as its outreach programs, concerto competition and chamber workshop.

Consisting of approximately seventy active members, the Alhambra Orchestra is governed by a thirteen-member board of directors and is funded by government grants, foundation support, and private donations.

Since its founding, the orchestra has promoted classical music throughout Miami-Dade County, by presenting residents with free or minimal-cost concerts throughout the local area. A typical season includes family concerts, a Hispanic Heritage celebration, holiday programs, and major symphonic concerts.

The orchestra promotes music education through outreach programs that include partnerships with school music programs and performances in various schools. Members also perform at hospitals and other community functions.

Other long-established programs include a concerto competition for South Florida students and a chamber-music workshop for musicians of all ages.

=== Leadership ===
The orchestra is led by Daniel Andai, its artistic director and principal conductor. Dr. Andai is committed to providing access for underserved groups, and to music education. He serves as dean of music at Miami's New World School of the Arts.

==== Conductors ====
- 1990–2000 – Leo Walz
- 2001–2002 – Isaac Chueke
- 2002–2008 – Reginald F. Nicholson
- 2009–2012 – Alfred Gershfeld
- 2012–2015 – Zoe Zeniodi
- 2015–2016 – Timothy Shade
- since 2016 – Daniel Andai

=== Representative guest artists ===
- Ross Harbaugh, cellist
- Daniel Andai, violin
- Paul Posnak, piano
- Mia Vassilev, piano
- Scott Flavin, violin
- Michael Klotz, viola
- Kemal Gecik, piano
- Thomas Mesa, cello

== See also ==
- List of orchestras in the United States
- Music of Miami
