= The New Rascals =

Background information
- Origin: New York, New York, United States
- Genres: Pop rock, R&B
- Years active: 2006–2011

The New Rascals are an American musical group featuring Rock and Roll Hall of Fame inductees Dino Danelli and Gene Cornish from the original band The Rascals, with Bill Pascali of Vanilla Fudge 2001 and Charlie Souza formerly with Mudcrutch and White Witch.

== History ==
In 1971, the band members were Dino Danelli drummer, Felix Cavaliere singer and B3 organ, singer Annie Sutton, and guitarist Buzz Feiten,

In 2008, the group performed on a live video recording, New Rascals Reloaded with Eddie Brigati, and on a digital audio recording titled New Rascals Legends, covering songs of the Young Rascals (also known simply as the Rascals), such as "Groovin'" and "Good Lovin'".
