= Vince Valholla =

Haitian American record producer, arranger, manager and entrepreneur

Vince Eyma, otherwise known as Vince Valholla and formally known as Vince The Prince, is a Haitian American record producer, arranger, manager, and entrepreneur. Vince is most known for founding Florida-based entertainment company, Valholla Entertainment which he also serves as chairman and chief executive officer. Vince is also the founder and lead of the ensemble/rotating collective Vince & The Valholla Empire.

On July 31, 2015, Valholla Entertainment released the independent debut album Doing The Most from GRAMMY Amplifier winner, singer-songwriter, Valholla recording artist Kirby Maurier On February 22, 2016, Kirby was announced as one of three winners of the fourth annual GRAMMY Amplifier program. Vince served as the album's executive producer/sequencer/co-producer and the album went on to become one of the highest selling independent R&B albums in the South Atlantic Region in 2015.

In September 2016, Vince signed production trio The Track Burnaz to Valholla Entertainment's management division. On December 2, Epic Records/Freebandz released The Track Burnaz produced single, "Bad Tings" by Zoey Dollaz featuring DB Bantino. The Track Burnaz contributed to Big Sean's fourth studio album, I Decided. on the track "Inspire Me" (produced by The Track Burnaz, Detail and Sidney Swift) and on Future's HNDRXX album with the song, "Use Me". I Decided. was certified Gold by the RIAA in April 2017.

On June 13, 2017, Miami New Times named Valholla Entertainment Best Record Label for their annual Best of Miami issue. In October 2017, Vince became the host and co-executive producer of the Dash Radio show, The Crib. Once airing weekly on Dash Radio's XXL Station, the show now airs on The City station (one of the many stations on Dash Radio).

On December 14, 2018, Reggae-Fusion singer-songwriter King Charlz released his debut album titled ‘Still Searching’ on Valholla Entertainment. This album marked the first Reggae album executive produced by Vince. The 8 song set debuted in the Top 10 of the iTunes Reggae chart and peaked at #6.

Beginning in January 2019, Vince and Valholla Entertainment entered into a global distribution agreement with AWAL. Vince later announced that he began work on a compilation album (Vince & The Valholla Empire) on June 29, 2019 and released the first single titled "Get It Started" featuring SIN a.k.a. LISTENtoSIN, Rob Markman, and Fatboy Shaw. This single was produced by The Track Burnaz, Staylookingout, and Vince Valholla and released on Valholla Entertainment.

During October 2019, SIN released a full-length LP titled 'Private Flight' featuring LunchMoney Lewis, Rob Markman and more. The LP which was executive produced by SIN and Vince Valholla peaked at #32 on iTunes Hip Hop Chart.

On October 7, 2022, Vince released the first single from his new ensemble project, Vince & The Valholla Empire titled "FOREVER" which featured singer/songwriter/producer ADN Lewis. The R&B song was produced by Vince Valholla, The Track Burnaz, and Vegas Fontaine. Co-written and co-produced by Curtis Richardson and ADN Lewis.

Vince also comments about the music industry on his blog, The chairman's Corner.
