= Charlie Souza =

American musician (born 1948)

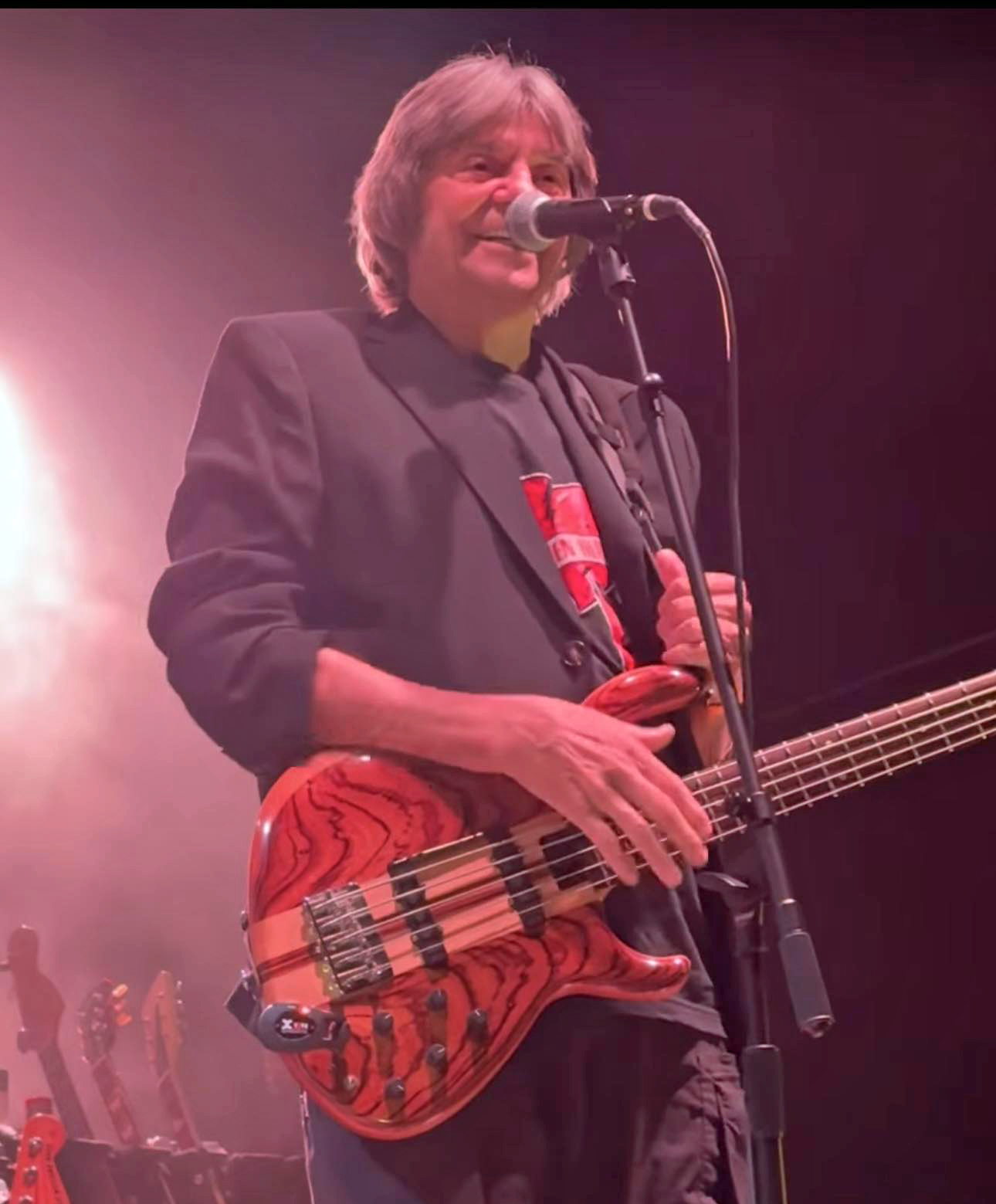
- Souza performing in 2025

Background information
- Born: Charles Jesse Souza; January 24, 1948 (age 78); Tampa, Florida, U.S.
- Genres: Rock and roll
- Occupations: musician, producer, writer
- Instruments: Bass, vocals
- Website: charliesouza.com

Charlie Souza is an American bass player, vocalist, musician, writer and producer, best known for playing bass in Mudcrutch with Tom Petty and The Tropics.

== Career ==
Souza toured with The New Rascals, featuring Rock and Roll Hall of Fame inductees Dino Danelli and Gene Cornish of The Rascals, with Bill Pascali (formerly with the Vanilla Fudge 2001) from 2006 to 2011. In 2008, the group performed on a live video recording, New Rascals Reloaded with Eddie Brigati, and on a digital audio recording titled New Rascals LEGENDS covering songs of the Young Rascals (also known simply as the Rascals), such as Groovin' and Good Lovin'.

Souza also toured, collaborated and recorded with musicians including Tom Petty. In August 2025, he was interviewed by Teresa Knox at Leon Russell's The Church Studio in Tulsa, Oklahoma about his time recording with Tom Petty and Mudcrutch. Charlie has also worked with Gregg Allman; Bill Champlin of Chicago; Michel Colombier; Mike Pinera, Malcolm Jones and Joe Lala of Blues Image; The New Cactus Band Cactus; White Witch; Gale Force with producer Wayne Henderson of The Jazz Crusaders; Native American actor Floyd Red Crow Westerman; Santana keyboardist Leon Patillo; The Darrell Mansfield Christian Band; comedian Fred Willard, and The Tropics, a '60s pop group from Tampa, Florida, winning first place at the International Battle of the Bands in Chicago in 1966, which led to a Columbia Records recording played on Dick Clark's American Bandstand.

Souza's music has been released on Columbia, Atlantic, Polydor, Fantasy and Laurie Records. Fortress on Atlantic Records was an '80s melodic metal group with a release on Wounded Bird Records in 2008, Fortress "Hands in the Till".

Souza recorded his solo albums Live Your Dream and 9 Ball in the Corner Pocket, together with former Robin Trower drummer Bill Lordan, and Tropics guitarist Eric Turner of Fortress. These two CDs were recorded in Anaheim and Hollywood, California.

Souza's song Carry Me Back to St. Petersburg off the Livin' in Paradise CD, recorded by his band The New Tropics in Tampa Bay area studios, was voted the winner of the official city song contest.

== Bibliography ==
- Live Your Dream A Music Autobiography. Janson Media Group, 2011. Tales of The Tropics, Tom Petty's Mudcrutch, New Rascals, Gregg Allman, Cactus, many Rock 'n' Roll friends! A story of real musical roots! The Life and times of Charlie Souza http://charliesouza.com
- "Florida's Famous and Forgotten" by Kurt "King of the Oldies" Curtis. Softcover, (2) Book Set 1024 pages. The Tropics chapter, pages 828 – 842.
- "Tampa Bay Music Roots" Charlie Souza & Keith Wilkins, Author ( 100 years of Music History in the Tampa Bay Area) Arcadia Publishing, The History Press
