= Bill Lordan =

American rock music drummer

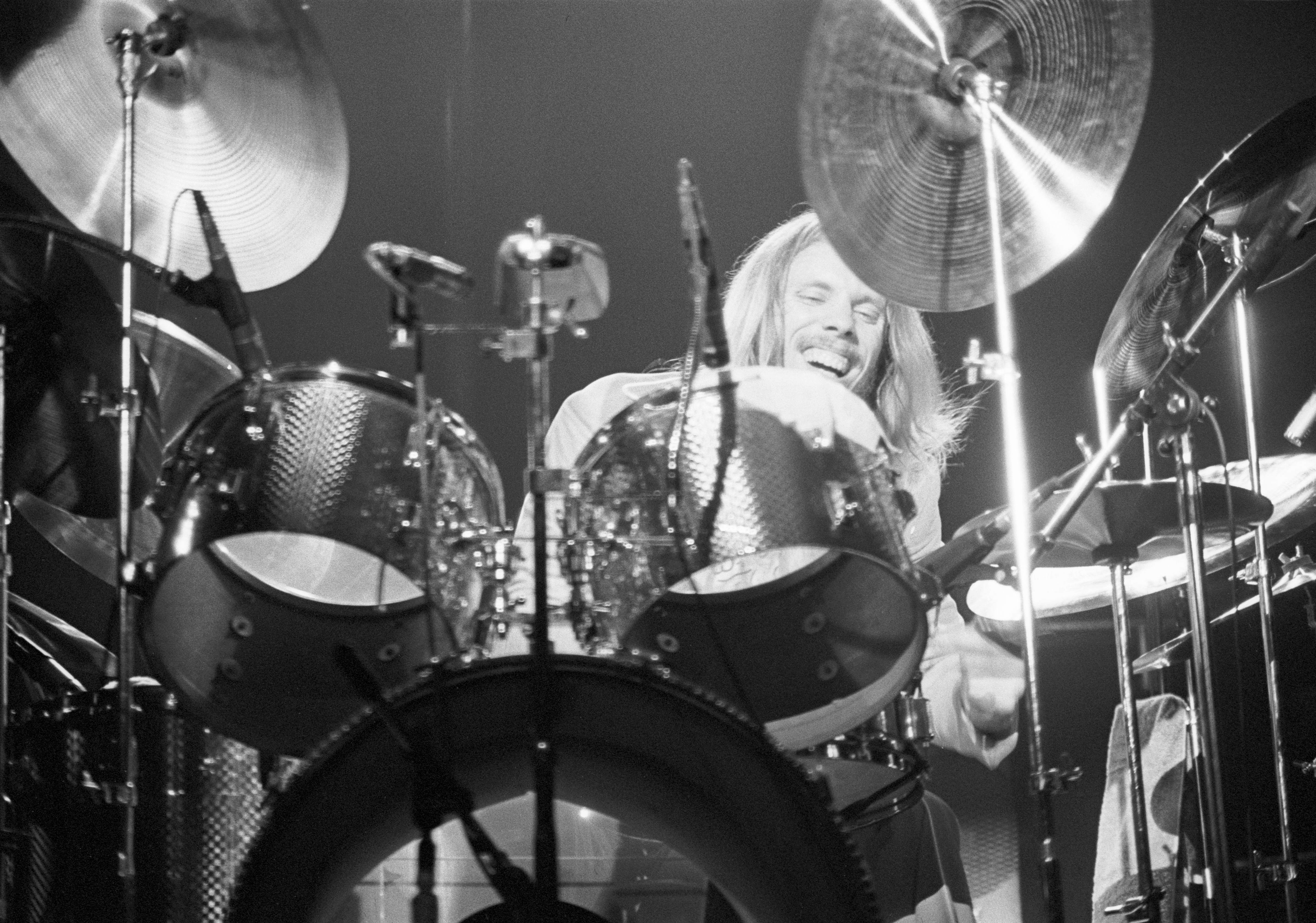

Background information
- Also known as: The Lord
- Born: 22 May 1947 (age 78)
- Genres: Various
- Occupation: Musician
- Instrument: Drums
- Formerly of: The Mystics, The Amazers, The Esquires, Gypsy, Sly and the Family Stone, The Robin Trower Band, The Dave Steffen Band, The Charlie Souza Band

Bill Lordan (born May 22, 1947 in Minneapolis, Minnesota), is an American rock music drummer who has been in a number of bands, such as The Mystics, Gypsy, The Robin Trower Band and Sly & The Family Stone. He began playing in sixth grade when his teacher offered after-school lessons.

== Career ==
Lordan started his recording career with The Amazers, The Mystics, The Esquires and Gypsy, a progressive rock band from Minnesota, recording three albums with them from 1971 to 1973. He also recorded with Bobby Womack and Ike and Tina Turner. He then joined Sly & The Family Stone. By 1974, Sly & The Family Stone released the album Small Talk. Along with violinist Sid Page, The first drummer for Sly & The Family Stone was Greg Errico who was succeeded on the album Fresh by Andy Newmark. He and Page left in 1974 with drummer Jim Strassburg taking his place and violinist Vicki Blackwell taking Page's place.

In late 1974, Lordan joined Robin Trower's band debuting on the album For Earth Below. He stayed with Trower until 1981, his last recording during his stint being the B.L.T. album with Jack Bruce. In 1980 he endorsed The Zildjian Company and was included in the Zildjian Cymbal Set Up Book of famous drummers. He also endorsed Rogers and DW Drum Companies and Remo and Aquarian Companies. He played with the Darrell Mansfield Band, the Dave Steffen Band and The Chris Aaron Band before starting his own band, The Bill Lordan Experiment, in 2000.

== Personal life ==
Bill is married to Diana Olson, a freelance entertainment writer.

== Discography ==
- 1964 The Amazers: It's You For Me
- 1967 The Esquires: Get on Up
- 1968 The Mystics: Pain
- 1971 Gypsy: In the Garden
- 1972 Gypsy: Antithesis
- 1973 Gypsy: Unlock the Gates
- 1974 Sly and the Family Stone: Small Talk
- 1975 Robin Trower: For Earth Below
- 1975 Ike & Tina Turner: Sexy Ida
- 1975 Bobby Womack: I Don't Know What the World Is Coming To
- 1975 Robin Trower: BBC Radio 1: Live in Concert
- 1976 Robin Trower: Long Misty Days
- 1975 Robin Trower: Live
- 1977 Robin Trower: In City Dreams
- 1978 Robin Trower: Caravan to Midnight
- 1980 Robin Trower: Victims of the Fury
- 1981 Robin Trower & Jack Bruce: B.L.T.
- 1983 Darrell Mansfield Band: The Vision
- 1990 Spellbinder
- 1990 Dave Steffen Band: Blues Cruise Live
- 1993 Dave Steffen Band: Give Me A Thril
- 1994 The Bill Lordan Drum Beat Instruction Video (DVD)
- 1996 Robin Trower: King Biscuit Flower Hour (In Concert)
- 1997 Dave Steffen Band: Flying Potion
- 2000 Charlie Souza: Live Your Dream
- 2000 Bill Lordan Experiment: BLX Live at the Coach House
- 2001 Charlie Souza: 9 Ball In The Corner Pocket
- 2001 Bill Lordan Experiment: Emotional Blackmail
- 2003 Talkin' To Angels
- 2003 Calvin James: It Ain't Over
- 2003 Bill Lordan Experiment: Here Comes The Storm
- 2004 Chris Aaron Band: 5 Miles to Freedom
- 2004 Lordan/Serrato: Eyes of a Woman
- 2004 Bill Lordan Experiment: The Best of BLX
- 2014 Bill Lordan Experiment: The NEW Best of BLX
- 2015 Bill Lordan Experiment: The Best of BLX II
- 2015 The Bill Lordan History CD
- 2015 The Robin Trower Band Live at the Paramount Theater, Seattle, WA.CD 3/7/75
- 2015 The Robin Trower Band Victims of the Fury Tour Live CD
- 2016 Bill Lordan Experiment: The Best of BLX III
- 2016 The Robin Trower DVD of TV Shows and Concerts
- 2016 The Robin Trower Band Live at New Georges, San Rafael, CA. 4/5/87
- 2016 The Robin Trower Band Live at Winterland, San Francisco, CA 3/15/75
- 2016 The Robin Trower Band Live The BBC Recordings
- 2016 The Robin Trower Band Live The Long Misty Days Tour CD
- 2016 The Robin Trower Band Live For Earth Below Tour CD
- 2016 The Robin Trower Band Live at Leeds University, England 2/15/75
- 2016 The Robin Trower Band Live at Madison Square Garden, NY 3/24/76
- 2017 The Robin Trower Band The Best of In City Dreams CD
- 2017 The Robin Trower Band Bridge of Sighs Tour CD
- 2017 The Robin Trower Band Live at City Hall, Newcastle, England CD
- 2017 The Robin Trower Band live in Gothenburg, Sweden 2/75
- 2017 Faith
- 2017 Feel The Spirit
- 2017 Gypsy Live at the St. Paul Winter Carnival 1973
- 2017 Gypsy Live at Armstrong High School, Minneapolis 1971
- 2017 The Robin Trower Band Long Misty Days Recording Sessions
- 2017 The Robin Trower Band Caravan To Midnight Recording Sessions
- 2017 The Best of The Dave Steffen Band
- 2019 A self published book of Bill Lordan's musical journey 'From The Basement To The Coliseum - The Story of Drummer Bill Lordan. Written by Bill Lordan and Diana Olson
