= Victims of the Fury =

Studio album by Robin Trower
- Released: April 1980
- Studio: AIR, London
- Genre: Blues rock
- Length: 32:06
- Label: Chrysalis
- Producer: Geoff Emerick, Robin Trower

Robin Trower chronology
Caravan to Midnight (1978)	Victims of the Fury (1980)	B.L.T. (1981)

Professional ratings
Review scores
Source	Rating
AllMusic	3/5 stars
Record Mirror	3/5 stars

Victims of the Fury is a studio album by the English guitarist and songwriter Robin Trower, released in 1980. This was the last album to feature the classic Robin Trower, James Dewar and Bill Lordan lineup. It also saw Trower writing again with his former Procol Harum colleague, lyricist Keith Reid nine years after they had last collaborated.

The album was issued on CD in 1989. It was reissued in 1997 as a 2-on-1 CD along with the previous 1978 album Caravan to Midnight. The Beatles engineer Geoff Emerick was the album's sound engineer. Victims of the Fury reached No. 34 on the Billboard 200.

== Track listing ==
All tracks composed by Keith Reid & Robin Trower; except where noted.

Side one

1. "Jack and Jill" (Robin Trower) – 2:44
2. "Roads to Freedom" (James Dewar, Trower) – 3:49
3. "Victims of the Fury" – 3:43
4. "The Ring" – 3:09
5. "Only Time" (Trower) – 3:51

Side two

1. "Into the Flame" – 3:25
2. "The Shout" – 2:33
3. "Mad House" (Dewar, Trower, Wally) – 2:45
4. "Ready for the Taking" – 3:00
5. "Fly Low" – 3:07

== Personnel ==
- Robin Trower – guitar, producer
- James Dewar – bass, vocals
- Bill Lordan – drums

== Technical personnel ==
- Geoff Emerick – recording engineer, mix engineer, producer
- Jon Walls – assistant engineer

== Charts ==
Chart (1980)	Peak position
Australia (Kent Music Report)	95
United Kingdom (Official Charts Company)	61
United States (Billboard 200)	34
