= In the Garden (Gypsy album) =

Studio album by Gypsy
- Released: July 1971
- Recorded: Larrabee Sound, Los Angeles
- Genre: Progressive rock
- Length: 36:51
- Label: Metromedia
- Producer: Clark Burroughs

Gypsy chronology
Gypsy (1970)	In the Garden (1971)	Antithesis (1972)

In the Garden is the second album by the progressive rock band Gypsy, their second for Metromedia. It peaked at #173 on the Billboard Pop Albums charts in 1971, and was produced by Clark Burroughs of vocal group The Hi-Lo's.

In the Garden was re-released by Bedrock Records in 1999.

Professional ratings
Review scores
Source	Rating
Allmusic	3/5 stars

== Track listing ==
All songs by Enrico Rosenbaum except as noted. A bonus track, "20 Years Ago Today", was released on the Bedrock Records re-issue.

1. "Around You" – 5:27
2. "Reach Out Your Hand" – 2:33
3. "As Far as You Can See (As Much as You Can Feel)" (Rosenbaum with intro by Lordan/Walsh) – 12:09
4. "Here in the Garden I" – 6:43
5. "Here in the Garden II" – 3:07
6. "Blind Man" – 3:59
7. "Time Will Make It Better" (Walsh) – 2:53

== Personnel ==
- Enrico Rosenbaum – guitar, vocals
- James Walsh – keyboards, vocals
- James Johnson – guitar, vocals
- Bill Lordan – drums
- Willie Weeks – bass
- Joe Lala – percussion

== Production notes ==
- Produced by Clark Burroughs
- Engineered by Jerry Barnes
