= Unlock the Gates =

Studio album by Gypsy
- Released: 1973
- Studio: RCA Studios, Hollywood
- Genre: rock
- Label: RCA Victor
- Producer: Jack Richardson, Jim Mason

Gypsy chronology
| Antithesis (1972) | Unlock the Gates (1973) |

Unlock the Gates is the fourth and last album by the rock band Gypsy. Keyboardist James Walsh continued the band in various incarnations as The James Walsh Gypsy Band. The horn section is from the band Chicago.

Professional ratings
Review scores
| Source | Rating |
|---|---|
| Allmusic | 3/5 stars |

== Track listing ==
All songs by Enrico Rosenbaum except as noted.

1. "Is That News?" (Rosenbaum, Johnson) – 3:15
2. "Make Peace With Jesus" (Rosenbaum, Walsh) – 3:15
3. "One Step Away" (Walsh) – 3:11
4. "Bad Whore (The Machine)" – 2:48
5. "Unlock the Gates" – 3:42
6. "Join In" – 2:46
7. "Need You Baby" – 3:05
8. "Smooth Operator" – 3:20
9. "Don't Get Mad (Get Even)" – 3:14
10. "Precious One" (Johnson) – 4:19

== Personnel ==
- Enrico Rosenbaum - guitar, vocals
- James Walsh - keyboards, vocals
- James Johnson - guitar, vocals
- Bill Lordan - drums
- Randall Cates - bass, vocals
- Walter Parazaider - saxophone
- James Pankow - trombone
- Lee Loughnane - trumpet

== Production notes ==
- Produced by Jack Richardson, Jim Mason
- Engineered by Brian Christian

== Charts ==
Single

| Year | Single | Chart | Position |
|---|---|---|---|
| 1973 | "Make Peace With Jesus/Don't Bother Me" | | |
| 1973 | "Need You Baby/Precious One" | | |
| 1973 | "Need You Baby (stereo)/Need You Baby (mono)" | | |
