= Gypsy (Gypsy album) =

Studio album by Gypsy
- Released: August, 1970
- Recorded: Devonshire Studios, North Hollywood, CA
- Genre: Progressive rock
- Length: 67:14
- Label: Metromedia
- Producer: James Walsh, Enrico Rosenbaum, Glen Pace

Gypsy chronology
Gypsy (1970)	In the Garden (1971)

Gypsy is the debut double album by the progressive rock band Gypsy. It was recorded at Devonshire Studios, North Hollywood, California, and released in 1970. The album was re-released in 1979 on a K-tel label named Cognito and again in 1999 on CD by Bedrock Records. "Gypsy Queen" is the band's only charted single, peaking at #64. The album peaked at #44 on the Billboard Pop Albums charts in 1970.

== Reception ==
Professional ratings
Review scores
Source	Rating
Allmusic	4.5/5 stars

Writing for Allmusic, music critic Richard Foss wrote of the album "Though nothing else on Gypsy's debut album came quite up to the standard of the opening number, the whole album is enjoyable for connoisseurs of jazzy progressive rock... In retrospect, it's hard to believe that this debut didn't make a bigger splash when it was first released. Gypsy's work has held up very well compared to most albums from this era, and is still a delightful listen."

== Track listing ==
All songs by Enrico Rosenbaum except as noted.

=== Side 1 ===
1. "Gypsy Queen Part I" – 4:21
2. "Gypsy Queen Part II" – 2:33
3. "Man of Reason" (Johnson) – 2:59
4. "Dream If You Can" (Rosenbaum, Epstein) – 2:48
5. "Late December" – 4:12

=== Side 2 ===
1. "The Third Eye" (Walsh) – 4:55
2. "Decisions" – 8:16
3. "I Was So Young" – 4:00

=== Side 3 ===
1. "Here in My Loneliness" – 3:10
2. "More Time" – 5:35
3. "The Vision" – 7:30

=== Side 4 ===
1. "Dead and Gone" – 11:07
2. "Tomorrow is the Last to be Heard" – 5:48

=== Bonus track ===
A bonus track, "The Innocence", was recorded in 1999 by Walsh and Johnson and included on the Bedrock Records re-issue.

== Personnel ==
- Enrico Rosenbaum - guitar, vocals
- James Walsh - keyboards, vocals
- James Johnson - guitar, vocals
- Jay Epstein - drums
- Doni Larson - bass
- Preston Epps - percussion
- Jimmie Haskell - string arrangements
- James SK Wān - bamboo flute

== Production notes ==
- Produced by James Walsh, Enrico Rosenbaum, Glen Pace

== Charts ==
Single

Year	Single	Chart	Position
1970	"Gypsy Queen Part I/Dead and Gone"	Billboard	64
