= Caravan to Midnight =

Studio album by Robin Trower
- Released: August 1978
- Studio: Wally Heider, Los Angeles
- Genre: Blues, rock
- Length: 37:49
- Label: Chrysalis
- Producer: Don Davis

Robin Trower chronology
In City Dreams (1977)	Caravan to Midnight (1978)	Victims of the Fury (1980)

Professional ratings
Review scores
Source	Rating
AllMusic	3/5 stars
Christgau's Record Guide	C
The Rolling Stone Album Guide	2.5/5 stars

Caravan to Midnight is the sixth studio album by Robin Trower, released in 1978. The album cover art is by Hipgnosis. It was reissued in 1997 as a 2-on-1 CD along with his next 1980 album Victims of the Fury.

== Track listing ==
All tracks by James Dewar and Robin Trower except where noted.

Side one

1. "My Love (Burning Love)" – 3:17
2. "Caravan to Midnight" (Robin Trower) – 5:01
3. "I'm Out to Get You" – 5:24
4. "Lost in Love" – 4:27

Side two

1. "Fool" – 3:45
2. "It's for You" – 4:38
3. "Birthday Boy" – 3:51
4. "King of the Dance" – 3:10
5. "Sail On" – 4:02

== Personnel ==
- Robin Trower – guitar
- James Dewar – vocals
- Rustee Allen – bass
- Bill Lordan – drums
- Paulinho da Costa – percussion (tracks 1–3, 6, 8)

Technical

- Pete Ellis Bishop – engineer
- Chris Desmond, Ralph Osborn – assistant engineer
- Hipgnosis – art direction
- George Hardie – illustration, design

== Charts ==
Chart (1978)	Peak position
Australia (Kent Music Report)	87
United States (Billboard 200)	37
