= Doing the Most =

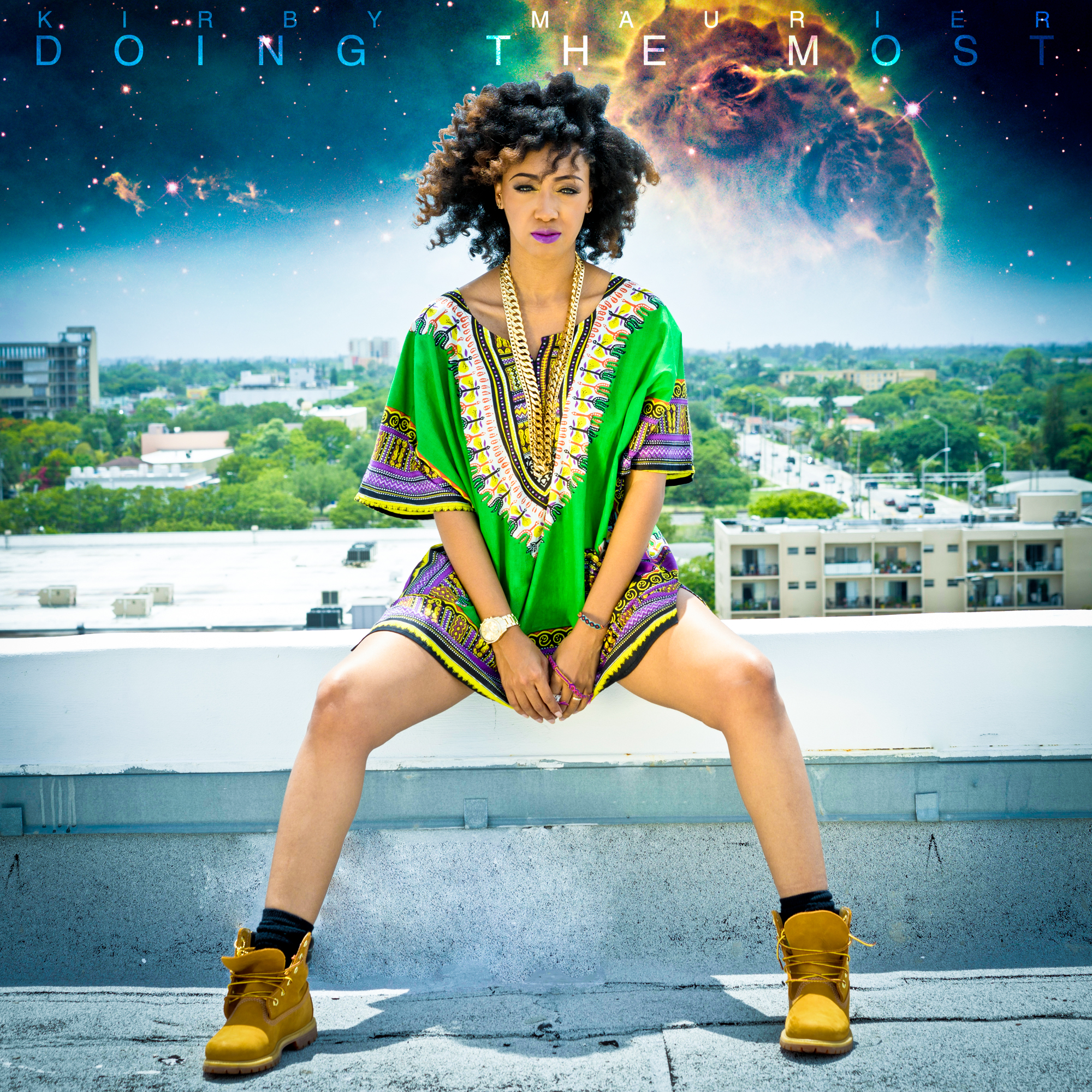

Studio album by Kirby Maurier
- Released: July 31, 2015
- Recorded: 2013–2015
- Label: Valholla Entertainment

Doing The Most is the independent debut studio album by American singer-songwriter Kirby Maurier, released on July 31, 2015 by Valholla Entertainment.

Doing The Most features production entirely by Haitian-American producer-songwriter Vegas Fontaine. All of the songs were written by Maurier with the exception of "Iz U Wit It" which was co-written by Fontaine. Valholla Entertainment Chairman and CEO Vince Valholla serves as the album's executive producer alongside Maurier and Fontaine.

Current singles from the album include "Iz U Wit It" "S.P.P. (Sweet Potato Pie)" and "Paradise". Upon its release, Doing The Most earned regional success within the United States.

== Track listing ==
Credits adapted from Maurier's official Doing The Most digital booklet.

Doing The Most
No.	Title	Writer(s)	Producer(s)	Length
1.	"Roll 1 (Pt. I)"	Kirby Maurier	Vegas Fontaine	0:41
2.	"N-Sh*t"	Kirby Maurier	Vegas Fontaine	2:51
3.	"Fa Sho"	Kirby Maurier	Vegas Fontaine	3:15
4.	"S.P.P. (Sweet Potato Pie)"	Kirby Maurier	Vegas Fontaine	3:27
5.	"Roll 1 (Pt. II)"	Kirby Maurier	Vegas Fontaine	1:42
6.	"On It"	Kirby Maurier	Vegas Fontaine	4:45
7.	"Paradise"	Kirby Maurier	Vegas Fontaine	3:25
8.	"Ballin’"	Kirby Maurier	Vegas Fontaine	2:44
9.	"Iz U Wit It"	Kirby Maurier; Vegas Fontaine	Vegas Fontaine	3:49
Total length:				26:39
