= White Witch (band) =

1970s rock group

Background information
- Origin: Tampa, Florida, United States
- Genres: Hard rock, psychedelic rock
- Years active: 1971–1975
- Label: Capricorn

White Witch was an American hard rock band from Tampa, Florida, United States, that made two albums for Capricorn Records in the early 1970s. Their name was a paean to "white magic", contrary to the "black magic" of groups like Black Sabbath. As the band announced before their shows: "To bring good where there once was evil, to bring love where there once was hate, to bring wisdom where there once was ignorance; this is the power of White Witch".

The group was inducted into the Florida Musicians Hall of Fame's Florida Music Honor Roll.

== History ==
White Witch formed in 1971 in Tampa. The band originally featured lead singer Ronald "Ronn" (or "Ron") Goedert, guitarist Charles "Buddy" Richardson, keyboardist Hardin "Buddy" Pendergrass, drummer Robert "Bobby" Shea and bassist Loyall "Beau" Fisher. Several of the band members had belonged to a popular late-60s Tampa-area band called The Tropics.

After touring small venues around the southeast for almost a year, White Witch signed with Capricorn Records, a label that included outfits such as the Allman Brothers Band and the Marshall Tucker Band. Though somewhat uneasy about being the only non-southern rock performers signed to the label, the members agreed to the contract without a manager or any legal representation and quickly recorded their self-titled debut album in Capricorn's Macon, Georgia studios. The band toured extensively to support the record, opening for established acts such as Alice Cooper, Grand Funk Railroad, Billy Preston, and others.

Fisher left the group sometime after the first album and was replaced by Rabbi Barbee, who left before the group went back in into the studio in 1974. Bassist Charlie Souza and drummer Bill Peterson also joined the band before the second album.

Due to displeasure with their record label's lack of promotion and its interference in the band's recording sessions, Buddy Richardson left the group immediately after the second album (A Spiritual Greeting) was completed. He was replaced by guitarist George Brawley, who had spent the previous year as a session guitarist in Los Angeles after leaving the southern rock group Brother from Columbia, South Carolina. Drummer Bobby Shea stayed with the group as percussionist and back-up singer.

White Witch did a bit more touring and recorded a demo of four tracks, but broke up in the late 1970s before a third album was recorded. After White Witch, Goedert made some solo recordings, Pendergrass wrote commercial jingles and opened a recording studio, and Richardson played in other bands ("Revolver").

Some of the original group members began planning a reunion in the late 1990s which became impossible when lead singer Ron Goedert died of cancer on July 16, 2000. Pendergrass also became a victim of cancer on March 16, 2003.

== Music ==
Though primarily known as a hard rock band, White Witch's music cannot be easily classified into a single genre. Songs on each album ranged from progressive rock and psychedelic to honky-tonk to southern boogie to pop rock. The band has also been described as "a prototype hair metal band". The common threads through their work were lyrics with a new age/spiritual theme and the use of an early moog synthesizer.

Most of the songs on their first album were written by Goedert and Pendergrass, with contributions from the other band members. All of the songs on the second album were written by Goedert, Pendergrass, and Richardson. Both albums were released on CD in 1999.

White Witch lead singer Ron Goedert released Breaking All The Rules in 1980 on Polydor Records and Frank Fenter record company, featuring Riff West on bass, Jack West on drums and Jerry Runyan on guitar. The group toured with major acts Toto, Joe Perry, ZZ Top, and Mountain, before disbanding in late 1980. Intended to be the third White Witch LP, Polydor execs would not allow the use of the name owned by Capricorn, so the record was released under Goedert's name. It has never been distributed on CD and is available only on vinyl.

== Discography ==
- White Witch, LP (1972, Capricorn Records 0107)
- A Spiritual Greeting, LP (1974, Capricorn Records 0129)
- "And I'm Leaving", 45 (1972, Capricorn Records)

=== White Witch ===
White Witch was released on Capricorn Records, Capricorn 0107. Rolling Stone Record Guide gave it one star out of five, saying that it was a Southern answer to Black Sabbath. The original review in Rolling Stone described it as "Halloween music".

- all songs by Goedert and Pendergrass except as noted
1. "Parabrahm Greeting/Dwellers of the Threshold" (Goedert, Pendergrass, Richardson, Shea, and Fisher)
2. "Help Me Lord"
3. "Don't Close Your Mind" (Goedert, Pendergrass, and Richardson)
4. "You're the One"
5. "Sleepwalk"
6. "Home Grown Girl"
7. "And I'm Leaving"
8. "Illusion"
9. "It's So Nice to Be Stoned" (Richardson and Fisher)
10. "Have You Ever Thought of Changing/Jackson Slade"
11. "The Gift" (Goedert, Pendergrass, Richardson, Shea, and Fisher)

=== A Spiritual Greeting ===
A Spiritual Greeting was released as Capricorn 0129. This album included Bill Peterson of Bacchus on drums and Charlie Souza of The Tropics, Cactus (and later Mudcrutch) on bass guitar. Rolling Stone gave it two stars out of five, saying that the only thing it had going for it was the "fine production by Ron and Howard Albert".

- All songs by Goedert, Pendergrass, and Richardson
1. "We'll All Ride High (Money Bag$)"
2. "Slick Witch"
3. "Walk On"
4. "Class of 2000"
5. "Showdown"
6. "Crystallize and Realize"
7. "Black Widow Lover"
8. "Auntie Christy/Harlow"
