= The Tempests (band) =

American garage rock band

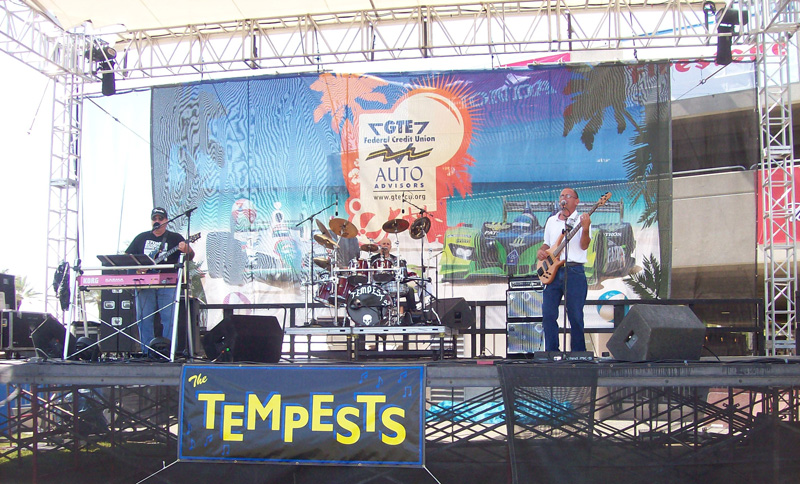

Background information
- Origin: Tampa Bay, Florida
- Genres: Garage rock, pop, blues, soul
- Years active: 1962 - present
- Members: Tommy Angarano, Darren Shaw, Robert Foster
- Past members: Charlie Bailey, Doug Palmer, Bill Hickman, Bobby Allen, Buddy Peterson, Mike Hammer, Brad Myers, Roy Delise, Bill Cole, John Bretherton, Wayne Murray, Mark Guidici, Chris Winter, Brian Collett.
- Website: thetempests.com

The Tempests are an American garage rock band that formed in 1962 in Tampa Bay, Florida, and have continued to remain active over the years, still playing to audiences.

The Tempests started performing throughout Florida at venues like The Eldorado Showcase, National Guard Armory, Bayfront Center in St Petersburg, The Surfer's Club Madeira Beach, Curtis Hixon Hall Tampa, Sarasota Auditorium, Lakeland Civic Center, Bradenton Civic Auditorium, Melbourne Civic Center, Tiger's Den Cocoa Beach, University of Florida Gainesville and Clearwater Star Spectacular.

In 1966, after winning the Florida Battle of the Bands, and gaining their first recording contract, The Tempests recorded their first single at Fuller Recording Studios, in Tampa, Florida; "I Want you Only", backed by "I Want You To Know". Both songs received significant radio airplay.

Shortly after, Bobby Allen left the band and was replaced by Brad Meyers on drums. Charley Bailey also left to play with the Rosington Collins band and was replaced by keyboard player Roy Delise. This change gave The Tempests a further advantage to play the evolving styles of music that had become popular in the late 60s.

The Tempests were chosen as the Florida House Band for the Nationally acclaimed Hullabaloo tv show and related clubs in the 1960s.

Booked by Gulf Artist Productions, The Tempests shared the same stage with many 60s national recording artists, including the Dave Clark Five, The Shangri-Las, Blues Magoos, The Gap, Sam the Sham and the Pharaohs, Tommy James and the Shondells, The Mindbenders, The McCoys, The Doors, The Allman Brothers, Three Dog Night and Left Bank.

After one of the members was drafted during the Vietnam era, Tommy Angarano pursued additional music interests playing in The Emotions, Pink Anacin, Raven and the Outlaws, before regrouping as "The Tempests". Angarano began his musical career, at an early age, and at the age of 10 appeared on “Ted Mack’s Amateur Hour” playing the accordion.

The Tempest Band, with Angarano, continued playing locally over the years, joined by other musicians. Following the last of their reunions in 1998, former members Mike Hammer and Buddy Peterson returned for a few years.

Today, they still share the stage with many national acts as well as performing at their own venues.

== Discography ==
- I Want You Only (1966)
- I Want You To Know (1966)
- Can't You See (1978)
- Tempest Covers (1986)
- You Say You Love Me (1996)
- DevilDog (1997)
- Look At Me (1998)
- Just Another Day In Paradise (1998)
- Bed of Roses (2006)
