= The Tropics (band) =

American rock band (1964–1970)

Background information
- Origin: Tampa, Florida, United States
- Genres: Pop rock, classic rock, R & B
- Years active: 1964–1970
- Label: Columbia

The Tropics was a band formed in 1964 in Tampa, Florida. It included Buddy Pendergrass along with Wayne Guida, Ronnie Ferer, and Spencer Hinkle. Not long after, the Tropics began to perform all over Florida and the Southeastern US where they toured alongside The Who, The Young Rascals, Herman's Hermits, and Heinz Heinz & Dad. In 1966 they won the International Battle of the Bands, signed a recording contract with Columbia Records, and quickly became the top pop rock-band in the Southeast.

== Career ==
The group's founder, Buddy Pendergrass put together a seven-piece horn band in 1964 with Wayne Guida on trumpet, Ronnie Ferrer on tenor sax and Spencer Hinkle on drums, playing at all the local Tampa area recreation venues.

Beginning in the summer of 1965, the Tropics toured the state of Florida and the Southeastern United States as a five-piece combo, opening shows for The Who in Miami, The Young Rascals in Tampa and Herman's Hermits in Jacksonville, and at the Diplomat Hotel in Miami, opening the show for Heinz Heinz & Dad for a Columbia Records Showcase.

In 1966 The Tropics won The International Battle of the Bands at McCormick Place in Chicago. Competing against performers such as Chicago and Tommy James and the Shondells, The Tropics took first place over more than 1000 bands. Out of that came a recording contract with Columbia Records and the single "Take the Time," produced by Teo Macero, which made it to the top of the local charts and was awarded a "85" on Dick Clark's American Bandstand. The group was also on the American Bandstand tour opening for The Young Rascals.

The Tropics became one of the most popular Pop Rock-Showbands in the Southeastern United States between 1965 and 1969 with band members Buddy Pendergrass, Mel Dryer, Charlie Souza, Bobby Shea and Eric Turner. (photo)

The Tropics recorded their first 45 RPM records in Tampa Bay area recording studios and later at Malaco Recording Studios in Jackson, Mississippi. In 1968 a recording session at Columbia Records Studios in New York produced their first hit, "Time".

Sunn Sound Equipment based in Tualatin, Oregon, sponsored the band in the late 1960s by furnishing all sound equipment. Ludwig Drums in New York City, also sponsored the band and furnished Ludwig Premier Drums.

In 1971, Pendergrass formed the Capricorn Records glam rock/psychedelic/hard rock group, White Witch.
