= Gypsy (band) =

American progressive rock band

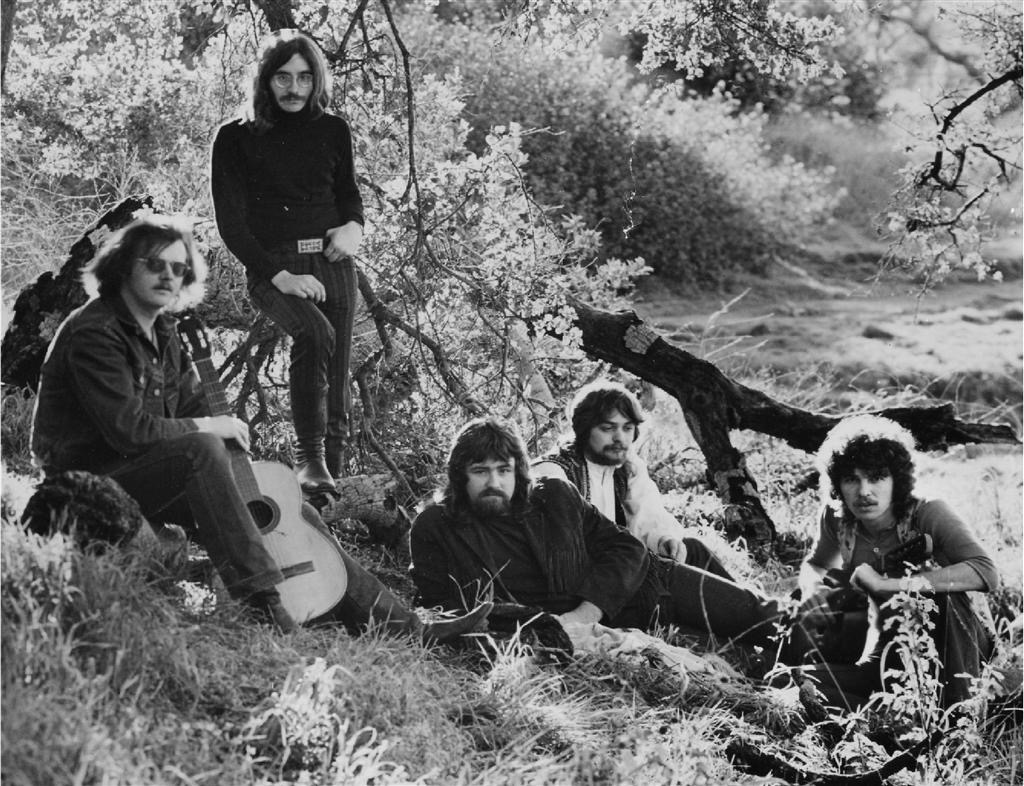

Background information
- Origin: Minneapolis-Saint Paul, Minnesota, United States
- Genres: Progressive rock; rock
- Years active: 1969–1975; 1996
- Labels: Metromedia; RCA; United Artists; AJK; Bedrock; Metro
- Spinoffs: James Walsh Gypsy Band
- Past members: James Calvin Johnson; Enrico Rosenbaum; James "Owl" Walsh; Doni Larson; George Halvorson; Randy Cates; Willie Weeks; Bill Lordan; Jay Epstein; David Challman; Stan Kipper; Barry Kay

Gypsy was an American progressive rock band from Minnesota, formed as The Underbeats (1962–1968). Gypsy was the house band at the Whisky a Go Go, West Hollywood, California from September 1969 to April 1971 and were known in 1970 for their US Billboard Hot 100 single "Gypsy Queen Part 1", which peaked at #62. The track "Dead And Gone" was played extensively on KSHE 95 in St. Louis MO, KADI-FM in St. Louis MO, and KWK St. Louis. Most of Gypsy's music was composed and written by guitarist and singer Enrico Rosenbaum. Drummer Bill Lordan went on to play with Sly & the Family Stone and a long career with Robin Trower. Keyboardist James Walsh continued the band in various incarnations as The James Walsh Gypsy Band. The James Walsh Gypsy Band had one Hot 100 entry in 1978 with, "Cuz, It's You Girl" which peaked at #71.

The group has no relation to the British band of the same name formed in 1968, who recorded two albums for United Artists Records in the UK.

Jim Johnson died of esophageal cancer in hospice care on September 26, 2019, at age 76. James '"Owl" Walsh died of congestive heart failure at hospital in Minneapolis, Minnesota, on March 4, 2023, at age 74.

== The Underbeats ==
In 1962, Jim Johnson and Russ Hagen would frequently get together and play guitar. They invited friends, Doni Larson to play the bass, and Bob "Duke" Duane to play drums. The next year, the band would replace Hagen with Ray Berg on rhythm guitar, after Hagen enlisted in the army. In 1963, the band played their first gig at the Chisago City Civic Center. After Duane left the band to serve in the Navy, Rod Eaton would join as drummer. Over the next year, The Underbeats were able to garner a strong fanbase by playing local ballrooms and teen clubs.

== Discography ==
=== Albums ===
- Gypsy (Metromedia, 1970)
- In the Garden (Metromedia, 1971)
- Antithesis (RCA, 1972)
- Unlock the Gates (RCA, 1973)

=== Singles ===
- "Gypsy Queen Part I" / "Dead and Gone", (Metromedia)
- "Cuz, It's You Girl" / *Bring Yourself Around", (RCA)
- "Day After Day" / "Lean on Me", (RCA)

=== The James Walsh Gypsy Band albums ===
- The James Walsh Gypsy Band (1978, RCA)
- 20 Years Ago Today (1996, Metro)
- Muscle Shoals 1979 (2008, Gypsy Family Productions)
- I've Got The Feelin' (2016, Preservation; P-Vine)
- Last Show in St. Louis, November 4, 2017
