= Valholla Entertainment =

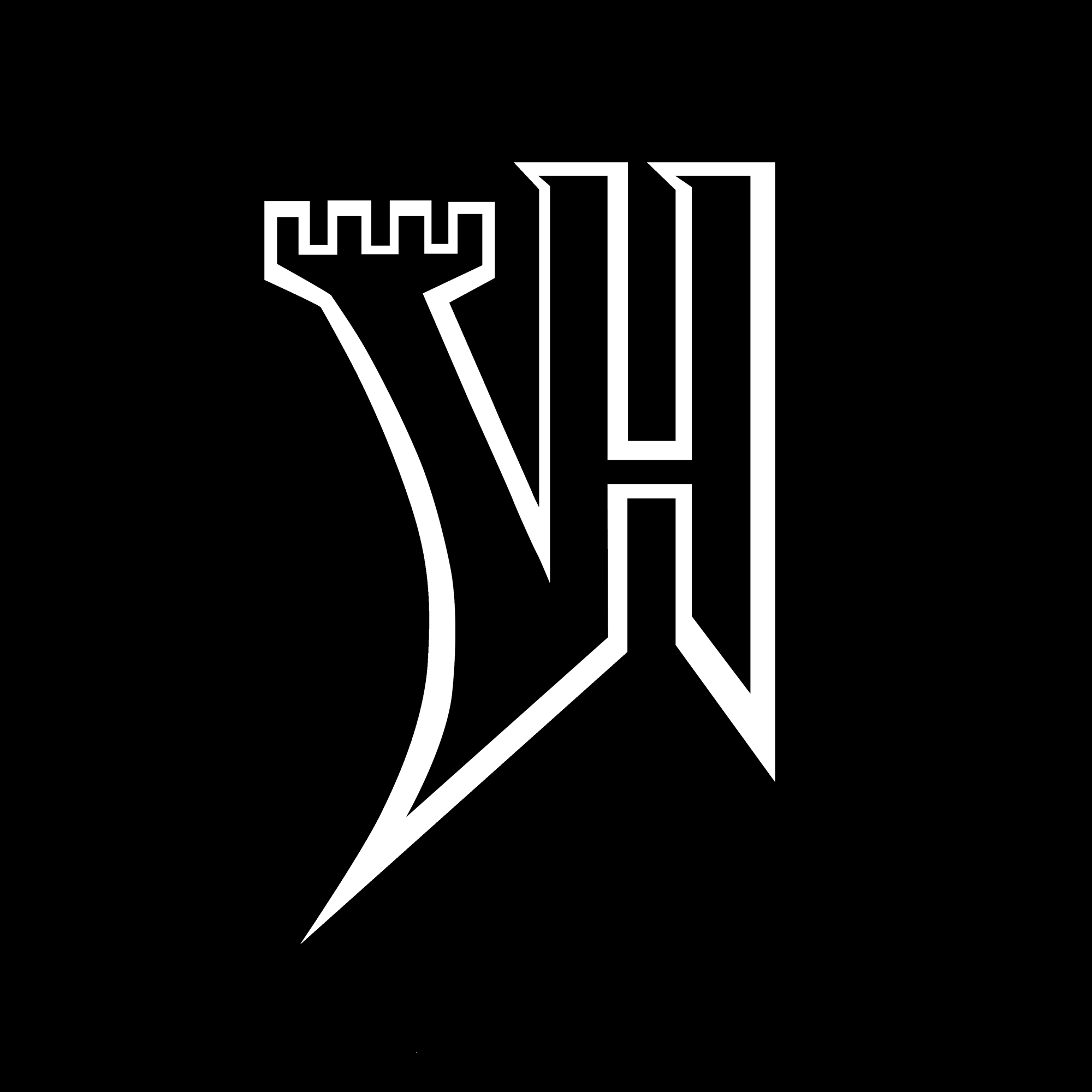
- Founded: 2005; 20 years ago
- Founder: Vince Valholla
- Genre: Hip hop; R&B
- Country of origin: United States
- Location: Miami, Florida
- Official website: www.valholla.com

Valholla Entertainment is an American music company and artist management company. Founded by Vince Valholla in 2005, in Miami, Florida. Valholla Entertainment’s 2015 release of Kirby Maurier’s Doing The Most was one of the highest selling independent R&B albums in the South Atlantic Region that year (US). On February 22, 2016, Valholla Recording Artist Kirby Maurier was announced as one of three winners of the fourth annual GRAMMY Amplifier program.

In the spring of 2016, Kirby embarked on a multi-city tour which included stops for the GRAMMY Pro Songwriters Summit, The 3rd Annual Los Angeles Chapter GRAMMY Showcase and South by Southwest music festival.

In September of 2016, Valholla announced the production trio The Track Burnaz as a new addition to their management roster. On December 2nd, Epic Records/Freebandz released The Track Burnaz produced single, "Bad Tings" by Zoey Dollaz featuring DB Bantino. The Track Burnaz contributed to Big Sean's fourth studio album, I Decided. on the track "Inspire Me" (produced by The Track Burnaz, Detail and Sidney Swift) and on Future's HNDRXX album with the song, "Use Me". I Decided. was certified Gold by the RIAA in April 2017.

On June 13, 2017, Miami New Times named Valholla Entertainment Best Record Label for their annual Best Of Miami issue.

In late 2018, Valholla released its first Reggae album with Jamaican born singer-songwriter King Charlz. His independent debut album titled 'Still Searching’, peaked at #6 on iTunes' Reggae chart. Months later, Valholla entered into a distribution agreement with Baton Rouge rapper Adam Dollar$. On July 12, 2019, Adam Dollar$ released an 8 song project titled 'It Comes At a Price'. After this release, Broward County Florida based rapper SIN also known as LISTENtoSIN (managed by Valholla) released his album PRIVATE FLIGHT on October 18. Both releases peaked in iTunes Hip Hop Charts in the Top 40.

On June 29, 2019 Vince Valholla announced that he began work on a compilation album (Vince & The Valholla Empire) and released the first single titled "Get It Started" featuring SIN aka LISTENtoSIN, Rob Markman, and Fatboy Shaw. This single was produced by The Track Burnaz, Staylookingout, and Vince Valholla and released on Valholla Entertainment. The untitled Vince & The Valholla Empire compilation album is set for release in 2020.

== Artists ==
- Kirby Maurier
- DJ Sylent
- The Track Burnaz
- SIN (In partnership with SoundsGoodFeelsBetter)
- The Pyrvmids
- Xali (In partnership with REGALIFE Records & SoFlo4Ever)
- King Charlz
- Vegas Fontaine
- Adam Dollar$ (Distribution)
- Ron Slyda
