= List of songs about Miami =

This article lists songs about Miami, set there, or named after a location or feature of the city.

It is not intended to include songs where Miami is simply named along with various other cities.

== Songs about Miami ==
- "Moon Over Miami" by Eddie Duchin 1935
- "Miami 2017 (Seen the Lights Go Out on Broadway)" by Billy Joel 1976
- "Smuggler's Blues" by Glenn Frey, blues rock, video inspired an episode of Miami Vice, 1984 (#12 on Billboard Hot 100)
- "You Belong To The City" by Glenn Frey from the Miami Vice soundtrack
- "Ice Ice Baby" by Vanilla Ice ("Miami's on the scene...My town, that created all the bass sound"), (#1 on Billboard Hot 100 in 1990)
- "Seminole Wind" by John Anderson (#2 on Hot Country Songs), video filmed in the Everglades, 1992
- "Everybody's Got a Cousin in Miami" by Jimmy Buffett from Fruitcakes 1994
- "Miami" by Will Smith ("Bienvenido a Miami") 1998* (Note: A star (*) symbol indicates that the music video for the song was filmed in Miami.)
- "Miami" by Counting Crows 2002
- "Miami" by Against Me! from Searching for a Former Clarity 2005
- "This is Miami" by Dutch DJ Sander Kleinenberg 2006
- "Defend Dade" by DJ Khaled ft. Pitbull and Casely, from We Global 2008
- "I'm in Miami Bitch" by LMFAO on the album Party Rock (#7 on UK Dance Chart) 2008
- "We Already Won" Flo Rida 2010
- "Miami 2 Ibiza" by Swedish House Mafia & Tinie Tempah (#1 on Dance Club Songs chart) 2010*
- "Move to Miami" by Enrique Iglesias ft. Pitbull (#5 on Dance Club Songs Chart) 2018*
- "Señorita (#1 on Billboard Hot 100) ("Land in Miami. The air was hot from summer rain") 2019
- "Miami" by John Mellencamp (on John Cougar album)
- "Miami" by Bob Seger on the album Like a Rock 1986
- "Miami" by U2 on the album Pop
- "Miami" by Randy Newman (on Trouble in Paradise)
- "Only in Miami" by Bette Midler
- "Going Back to Miami", written by Wayne Cochran, made famous by The Blues Brothers
- "Miami, My Amy" by Keith Whitley country pop, 1986
- "The New South" by Hank Williams Jr.
- "If the South Woulda Won" by Hank Williams Jr.
- "The Road Goes On Forever" The Highwaymen (country supergroup)
- "Miami" by Taking Back Sunday
- "Miami" by British band Foals
- "Swimming In Miami" by Owl City
- "Miami Pop" by Phil Fuldner
- "Miami" by Taylor Grey
- "Miami Beach" by Brazilian group Bonde do Rolê on the album Marina Gasolina EP
- "Miami is the Place for Me" by Big Money Jon
- "Welcome to Miami" by Pitbull 2002*, based on the song "Welcome to Atlanta"
- "Miami" by Yo Gotti
- "Miami Nights" by Wale
- "Summer Wit' Miami" by Jim Jones
- "Miami" by K'Jon
- "Everybody loves Miami" by Germany's The Underdog Project
- "Miami 5:02" by The Night Flight Orchestra 2012
- "Miami" by Australian band The Church from Further/Deeper 2014
- "Amiami" by French singer Philippe Katerine from Magnum 2013
- "Hully Gully Baby" by The Dovells
- "Welcome to Miami (South Beach)" by Max Pezzali 2019
- "Dear Miami" by Róisín Murphy 2007
- "Otra Noche en Miami" by Bad Bunny From X 100pre 2018
- "Turn to Miami" by The Night Flight Orchestra 2018
- "Wild Wild Love" by Pitbull ft. G.R.L ("When it comes to Miami, I always represent") 2014
- "To Miami" by Taxi (Roberto Zanetti) 1983
- "Que Sera Sera (Law Nebka Sawa)" by (Hiba Tawaji and Luis Fonsi) 2022
- "Arabi" by (Future ft. Mohamed Ramadan and Massari) 2024
- "Miami Ma Ma Ma Ma Mia" by Aditi Singh Sharma
- "Miami Dreams" by [Island Hoppers]
- "Miami" by [Baxter Drury]
- "Location" by Zerb, Ty Dolla $ign, Wiz Khalifa
- "Miami" by Morgan Wallen
- "Miami Groove" by Betty Wright

== See also ==
- Music of Miami
