= Music of Miami =

Music and musical traditions of Miami

The music of Miami spans a diverse range of genres and traditions, shaped by the city's position as a major center for Latin music in the United States and a gateway for Caribbean and Afro-Caribbean influences. Miami bass (also known as booty music), a prominent hip-hop genre in the late 1980s and early 1990s, was introduced in Miami; Luther "Luke Skyywalker" Campbell and his 2 Live Crew were among the more prominent Miami bass acts, largely because of an obscenity scandal fomented by Broward County, Florida Sheriff Nick Navarro.

Although not a South Florida native, Jimmy Buffett rose to prominence after moving to Key West, Florida and has long been associated with the "South Florida lifestyle". Other notable South Florida-based musical performers include Gloria Estefan, Marilyn Manson (began in Fort Lauderdale, Florida), Leslie Grace, Tony Succar, Vanilla Ice, DJ Laz, and Pitbull.

Cubans brought the conga and rumba, while Haitians and the rest of the French West Indies brought kompa and zouk to Miami from their homelands. Dominicans brought bachata and merengue, while Colombians brought vallenato and cumbia, and Brazilians brought samba. West Indians and Caribbean people have brought reggae, soca, calypso, and steel pan to the area as well.

== Music history ==
Miami's music history spans more than seven decades, from the founding of Criteria Studios in the 1950s, through the disco and funk explosion of the 1970s, to the emergence of Miami bass and freestyle as nationally influential genres in the 1980s and 1990s. Throughout that arc, the city's music industry has been shaped by its unique demographics, a convergence of Cuban, Haitian, Caribbean, and African American communities whose musical traditions have blended and fed off one another in ways that produced sounds found nowhere else.

=== 1950s and 1960s ===
The South Florida recording industry developed in Miami during the 1950s, including the establishment of Criteria Studios by Mack Emerman in 1958. In 1965, James Brown recorded "I Got You (I Feel Good)" at Criteria, the studio's first major hit. The studio later recorded albums such as Rumours by Fleetwood Mac and Hotel California by The Eagles. Producer and engineer Tom Dowd worked at Criteria for much of his career, collaborating with artists including Aretha Franklin, Ray Charles, Eric Clapton, and Lynyrd Skynyrd. Tom Petty also recorded at the studio.

=== 1970s ===
The Miami disco sound emerged in the early 1970s, driven in large part by local music entrepreneur Henry Stone and his label TK Records. TK Records produced the R&B group KC and the Sunshine Band, with hits including "Get Down Tonight", "(Shake, Shake, Shake) Shake Your Booty" and "That's the Way (I Like It)", as well as soul singers Betty Wright, George McCrae and Jimmy "Bo" Horne, and the Latin-American disco group Foxy, with their hit singles "Get Off" and "Hot Number". TK released the first disco song to reach number one on the pop music charts, "Rock Your Baby" by Miami area native George McCrae in 1974.Other artists on the label include Peter Brown, Jimmy "Bo" Horne, Gwen McCrae, T-Connection, and Anita Ward. Miami native Teri DeSario was also a popular artist during the disco era. The Bee Gees moved to Miami in 1975.

=== 1980s and 1990s ===
Gloria Estefan and the Miami Sound Machine hit the popular music scene with their Cuban-oriented sound attaining hits "Conga" and "Bad Boy".

The 1980s and 1990s also brought the genre of high energy Miami bass to dance floors and car subwoofers throughout the country. Miami bass spawned artists like 2 Live Crew (featuring Uncle Luke), 95 South, Tag Team, 69 Boyz, Quad City DJ's, and Freak Nasty. Notable songs from this era include "Whoomp! (There It Is)" by Tag Team in 1993, "Tootsee Roll" by 69 Boyz in 1994, and "C'mon N' Ride It (The Train)" by the Quad City DJ's in 1996.

=== 2000s and present ===
In the 2010s, Miami's influence on Latin music reached a global mainstream audience. The 2017 music video for "Despacito" by Luis Fonsi featuring Daddy Yankee reached over a billion views in under three months, and became one of the best-selling Latin singles in the United States. Reggaeton artist Bad Bunny released X 100pre in 2018, which Rolling Stone ranked number 447 on its 500 Greatest Albums of All Time list in 2020. MTV Latin America, based in Miami, has served residents across Mexico, Argentina, Venezuela, and other Latin American countries since 1993.

In 2017, breakout artist XXXTentacion brought the SoundCloud rap movement toward the mainstream. The movement, predominantly based in South Florida, takes its name from the audio distribution platform SoundCloud. Its style features heavily distorted bass, intentionally raw mixing, and fast tempos. The main artists in this movement include XXXTentacion, Lil Pump, Wifisfuneral, Ski Mask the Slump God, and Smokepurpp.

== Cultural influences ==
=== Latin and Caribbean influences ===
The influence of Caribbean and Latin American culture on Miami's music is deep and longstanding. Haitians brought kompa and zouk, Dominicans brought bachata and merengue, Colombians brought vallenato and cumbia, and Brazilians brought samba. West Indians and Caribbean people have contributed reggae, soca, calypso, and steel pan to the city's musical fabric.

==== Cuban influences ====
The influence of Cuban culture on the music of South Florida is particularly strong. Cubans brought the conga and rumba to Miami, traditions that fed directly into the city's club and dance music scenes. The 1997 album Buena Vista Social Club, performed by former stars of the Havana nightclub scene, won a Grammy and was listed by Rolling Stone as number 260 on its 500 Greatest Albums of All Time in 2003. Cuban American artist Ana Cristina, born in Miami in 1985, has been among the local Latin pop artists to emerge from this tradition. MTV Latin America, based in Miami, has served audiences across Mexico, Argentina, Venezuela, and other Latin American countries since 1993.

Cuban-American artists from Miami have drawn on their heritage in their music. Scholars have identified figures including Gloria Estefan and Pitbull as engaging with themes of Cuban-American identity, exile, and nostalgia in their work.

Miami's salsa style, often referred to as rueda de casino salsa, is associated with the city's Latin dance scene. The style originated in social clubs in Cuba in the 1950s and involves coordinated partner exchanges in a circle, typically directed by a caller. It remains present in Miami's club culture, with venues offering salsa events and instruction.

== Genres and scenes ==
Miami's music scene encompasses a range of genres, including disco and freestyle that developed locally in the 1970s and 1980s, as well as hip-hop, rock, and electronic dance music. The city's musical output reflects both local developments and external influences, some of which have gained wider recognition beyond South Florida.

=== Electronic dance music ===
Electronic dance music (EDM) and related genres have been a prominent component of South Florida's music scene since the 1970s. Starting in the 1970s with acts like Jimmy Bo Horne and KC and The Sunshine Band, dance music coming out of Florida could be heard all over the world. Early on, the dance scene in South Florida was mostly playing the EDM subgenres disco, house, and freestyle. Freestyle, a style of dance music popular in the 1980s and 1990s, was heavily influenced by electro, hip-hop, and disco. Many popular freestyle acts such as Pretty Tony, Debbie Deb, Stevie B, and Exposé, originated in Miami.

In the 1980s, Miami's dance scene began to attract international attention, aided in part by clubs that stayed open until 5 AM. In 1985 the Winter Music Conference, a yearly week-long dance music event, began in South Florida and has continued in Miami ever since. The conference is also associated with the Ultra Music Festival, which takes place the same week. By the 1990s, local DJs and producers such as Murk, also known as Funky Green Dogs, Planet Soul, and Robbie Rivera were gaining airplay around the world. Clubs such as Space, Crobar, and Mansion attracted internationally known DJs alongside local acts, and Miami extended its nightclub hours to 24 hours on weekends, further driving demand for dance music.

The warehouse party, acid house, rave, and outdoor festival scenes of the late 1980s and early 1990s provided alternatives to nightclubs and became havens for the latest trends in electronic dance music.

=== Hip-hop and Southern rap ===
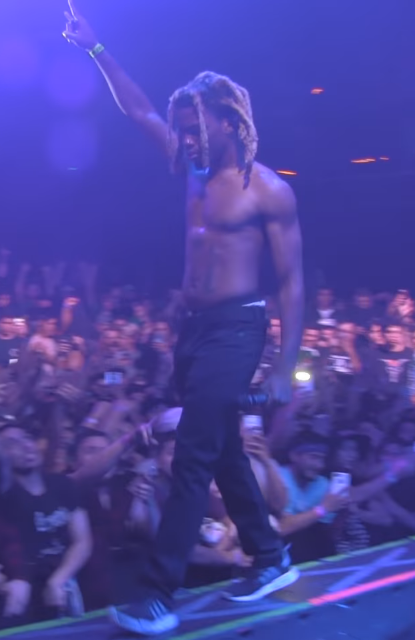
Denzel Curry performing in 2016

Southern rap is a category of hip-hop that developed in cities including Miami, New Orleans, Atlanta, Memphis, Houston, and Dallas. Miami and South Florida have been associated with the genre, with artists including Plies, DJ Laz, Trick Daddy, Pitbull, Flo Rida, JT Money, City Girls, Rick Ross, Trina, Jacki-O, Pretty Ricky, and 2 Live Crew.

During the 2010s, Miami developed a local scene associated with cloud rap, with artists such as SpaceGhostPurrp, Yung Simmie, and Denzel Curry identified as early figures. Trap music also gained popularity in Florida during this period, with artists such as Kodak Black achieving wider recognition. Denzel Curry and Kodak Black were both included in the XXL 2016 Freshman class.

South Florida has been associated with the emergence of SoundCloud rap in the late 2010s, a style characterized by lo-fi production, heavy bass, and unpolished mixing. Coverage has described the movement as centered in South Florida, with artists including XXXTentacion, Lil Pump, Wifisfuneral, Ski Mask the Slump God, and Smokepurpp. XXXTentacion was included in the XXL 2017 Freshman class, and Lil Pump, Ski Mask the Slump God, Smokepurpp, and Wifisfuneral were included in the 2018 class.

=== Miami bass ===
Miami bass is a style of hip-hop that developed in Miami in the mid-1980s, drawing on elements of electro hop. The genre is characterized by bass-heavy production, uptempo rhythms, and lyrics often oriented toward dance and club settings. Early figures associated with the style include Maggotron and Luther Campbell's 2 Live Crew. The group's recordings attracted national attention and were the subject of legal disputes over obscenity, including prosecutions of retailers and arrests of performers in connection with the album As Nasty as They Wanna Be, though charges were later dismissed.

Miami bass is part of a broader South Florida hip-hop scene that includes cities such as Miami, West Palm Beach, and Fort Lauderdale. The style has been associated with artists including Trick Daddy, DJ Uncle Al, DJ Khaled, Cool & Dre, and Slip "N" Slide Records, an independent label based in Miami.

=== Rock ===
Rock music activity in the Miami area increased during the late 1980s through the mid-1990s, with venues in South Beach and Fort Lauderdale supporting live performances. Acts associated with the region include The Mavericks, Nuclear Valdez, Nil Lara, Ed Hale, and Jack Off Jill. Ska punk band Against All Authority is from Miami, while rock and metal bands Nonpoint and Marilyn Manson were formed in Fort Lauderdale. Indie and folk artists Cat Power and Iron & Wine have also been associated with the area.

Cumbia

Cumbia

== Music industry and live music ==
=== Record labels and studios ===
Miami's recorded music industry developed with the founding of Criteria Studios by Mack Emerman in 1958, which became a major recording facility in the United States. Alongside Criteria, other studios and labels contributed to the city's music industry.

Local music entrepreneur Henry Stone and his label TK Records established an independent recording scene in the 1970s, producing artists including KC and the Sunshine Band, Betty Wright, and George McCrae. Releases from the label included early disco recordings, including a song that reached number one on the pop charts. By the 1970s, Miami-based record companies including Kubaney, Penart, and Maype were also active in releasing and reissuing Cuban music for Latin American audiences in the United States.

Songwriter and producer Desmond Child settled in Miami Beach in 1995 and established The Gentlemen's Club, a three-studio recording complex on his residential property, designed by David Frangioni of Audio One. The facility served as the base for his label, Deston Entertainment, which was distributed by Universal Music Group. Artists including Ricky Martin, Aerosmith, Bon Jovi, and Hanson recorded there, including Ricky Martin's 1998 World Cup theme "The Cup of Life.

Producer Emilio Estefan established Crescent Moon Studios in Miami-Dade County, where artists including Jennifer Lopez, Ricky Martin, and Gloria Estefan have recorded. The Bee Gees, who relocated to Miami in 1975, later established Middle Ear Studios in Miami Beach, where they produced recordings for artists including Barbra Streisand, Dionne Warwick, Kenny Rogers, and Diana Ross.

=== Live music venues ===
Miami's live music and nightclub scene has included venues that became associated with the city's music culture.

Hoy Como Ayer, located on Calle Ocho in Little Havana, operated for approximately two decades as a venue for Cuban music styles including son, guaracha, and filin. Entrepreneur Fabio Díaz Vilela acquired the predecessor venue Café Nostalgia in 1999 and developed it into a performance space presenting artists including Albita, Aymée Nuviola, Willy Chirino, and Malena Burke before its closure in 2019.

La Covacha, an open-air venue in West Miami-Dade, hosted Latin music performances including salsa, merengue, samba, and soca. A 1995 Billboard article described the venue as attracting a broad cross-section of audiences as well as celbreties such as Madonna and Anjelica Huston. Entrepreneur Aurelio Rodriguez was noted for presenting a broad range of Latin acts, including emerging artists, to Miami audiences.

Bongos Cuban Cafe, founded by Gloria and Emilio Estefan, operated at the American Airlines Arena in downtown Miami as a Latin music and dance venue, with regular programming including salsa events.

Club Space was founded by Louis Puig in 2000 in Miami's Park West neighborhood. The venue operated in a multi-room format with an outdoor terrace and became associated with electronic dance music programming in the city. Coverage has credited the club with contributing to the development of extended DJ sets in Miami.

=== Conferences and festivals ===
The Winter Music Conference, a week-long event for DJs, producers, and music industry professionals, has been held annually in Miami since 1985. It is associated with the Ultra Music Festival, which takes place during the same period and has grown into a major electronic music festival.

== See also ==
- List of songs about Miami
- Southern Rap
- Reggaeton
- Music of Florida
- Donk (automobile)
- South Florida Punk and Hardcore
