= Antithesis (Gypsy album) =

Studio album by Gypsy
- Released: 1972
- Recorded: July 3–9, 1972
- Studio: RCA's Music Center of the World, Hollywood, CA
- Genre: Rock
- Length: 39:54
- Label: RCA Victor LSP-4775
- Producer: Jack Richardson, Jim Mason

Gypsy chronology
In the Garden (1971)	Antithesis (1972)	Unlock the Gates (1973)

Antithesis is the third album by the American rock band Gypsy, their first on the RCA Victor label.

Professional ratings
Review scores
Source	Rating
Allmusic	2/5 stars

== Track listing ==
All songs by Enrico Rosenbaum except as noted.

1. "Crusader" (James Johnson, Enrico Rosenbaum) – 3:10
2. "Day After Day" (Randy Cates, James Walsh) – 3:15
3. "The Creeper" – 3:13
4. "Facing Time" – 4:12
5. "Lean On Me" – 3:13
6. "Young Gypsy" (James Johnson) – 3:06
7. "Don't Bother Me" – 3:13
8. "Travelin' Minnesota Blues" (Walsh, Rosenbaum) – 2:32
9. "So Many Promises" – 2:23
10. "Antithesis (Keep Your Faith)" – 3:21
11. "Edgar (Don't Hoover Over Me)" – 3:25
12. "Money" – 4:51

== Personnel ==
- Enrico Rosenbaum - guitar, vocals
- James Walsh - keyboards, vocals
- James Johnson - guitar, vocals
- Bill Lordan - drums
- Randy Cates - bass, vocals

== Production notes ==
- Produced by Jack Richardson and Jim Mason
- Engineered by Brian Christian

== Charts ==
Single

Year	Single	Chart	Position
1972	"Day After Day/Lean On Me"		
