= Kirby Maurier =

American singer-songwriter

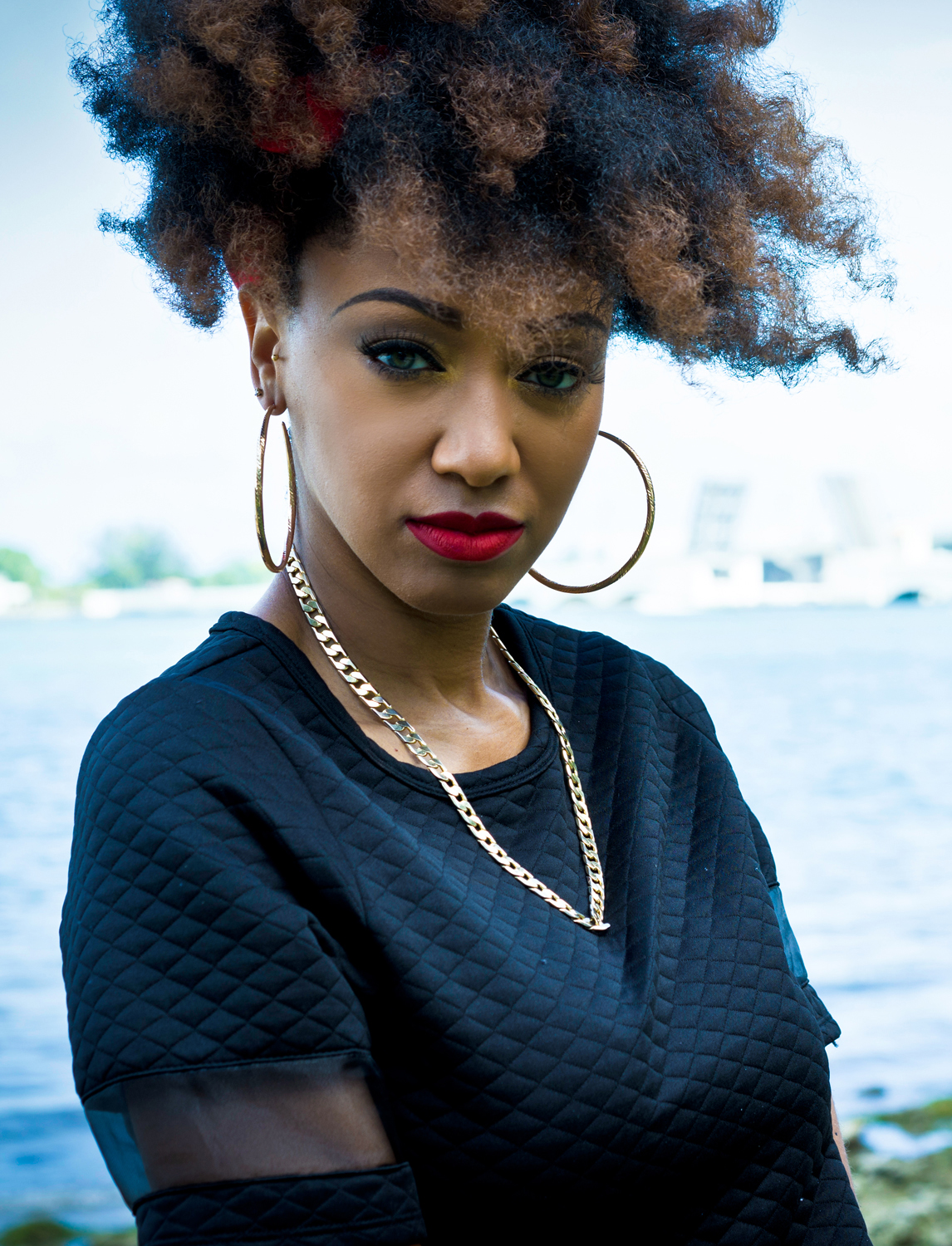
- Kirby Maurier, 2015

Background information
- Genres: R&B
- Occupation: Singer-songwriter
- Years active: 2008–present
- Label: Valholla Entertainment
- Website: kirbymaurier.com

Kirby Maurier (marie-aye) is an American singer-songwriter and founder of The Miami Music Museum. On July 31, 2015, she released her independent debut album, Doing The Most, on Valholla Entertainment and was one of the highest selling independent R&B albums in the South Atlantic region in 2015. Her first single, "You" was released in 2010 which led to the release of her '90s inspired EP, "Class of ’96" in 2012 and 2013 single "I’m Jus Sayin’" produced by Jackpot. "Iz U Wit It", the first single from the album Doing The Most is a trap heavy song with a slight departure of her original R&B sound. On February 22, 2016, Kirby was announced as one of three winners of the fourth annual GRAMMY Amplifier program.

In the spring of 2016, Kirby embarked on a multi-city tour which included stops for the GRAMMY Pro Songwriters Summit, The 3rd Annual Los Angeles Chapter GRAMMY Showcase and South by Southwest music festival.
