= The Partridge Family discography =

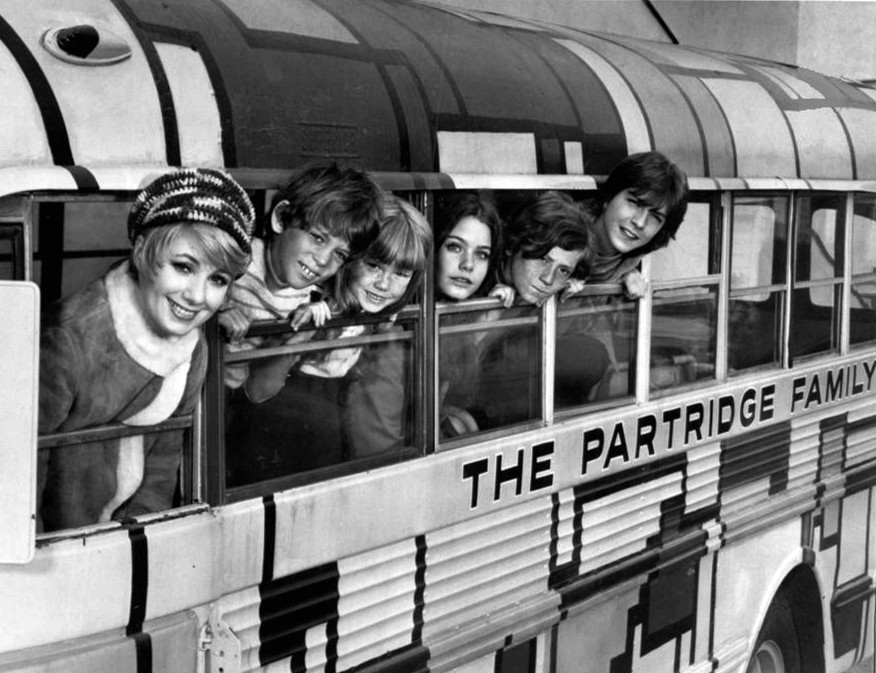
- The Partridge Family in 1970
- Studio albums: 8
- Compilation albums: 5
- Singles: 11
- Holiday albums: 1

This article presents the discography of all albums and singles released by the American pop-rock group The Partridge Family. It includes eight studio albums including one holiday release, plus five compilations and 11 singles.

The Partridge Family were a pop music act linked to the popular 1970–74 ABC-TV television series The Partridge Family, featuring lead and backing vocals respectively by the programme's stars David Cassidy and Shirley Jones, plus professional backing vocalists and session musicians. The other four cast members portraying the TV family featured on several of the album covers but did not participate in the recordings. The "group" recorded from 1970 to 1973 and in late 1970 topped the Billboard Hot 100 chart with the debut single "I Think I Love You", which NARM declared the year's best-selling single. In 1971 the Partridge Family were Grammy-nominated for the Best New Artist of 1970.

The Partridge Family's 1972 and 1973 single releases fared much better in the UK than in the US, coinciding with David Cassidy's UK standing as a solo star during this period. "Breaking Up Is Hard to Do" was released in the UK in 1972 as a maxi single with "I Think I Love You" on the same side and "I'll Meet You Halfway" on the B-side. It reached No. 3 on the UK chart.

== Albums ==
=== Studio albums ===
Title	Details	Peak chart positions					Certification
Title	Details	US	US Cash Box	AUS	CAN	UK	Certification
The Partridge Family Album	Release date: 1970; Label: Bell 6050; Formats: LP, 8 track, cassette, reel	4	6	30	6	—	US: Gold
Up to Date	Release date: 1971; Label: Bell 6059; Formats: LP, 8 track, cassette, reel	3	3	10	1	46	US: Gold
Sound Magazine	Release date: 1971; Label: Bell 6064; Formats: LP, 8 track, cassette, reel	9	9	18	5	14	US: Gold
A Partridge Family Christmas Card	Release date: 1971; Label: Bell 6066; Formats: LP, 8 track, cassette	—	19	—	—	45	US: Gold
Shopping Bag	Release date: 1972; Label: Bell 6072; Formats: LP, 8 track, cassette	18	16	45	13	28	US: Gold
The Partridge Family Notebook	Release date: 1972; Label: Bell 1111; Formats: LP, 8 track, cassette	41	33	—	—	—	
Crossword Puzzle	Release date: 1973; Label: Bell 1122; Formats: LP	167	105	—	—	—	
Bulletin Board	Release date: 1973; Label: Bell 1137; Formats: LP	—	124	—	—	—	
"—" denotes releases that did not chart.

=== Compilations ===
Title	Details	Peak chart positions				Certification
Title	Details	US	US Cash Box	CAN	UK	Certification
At Home with Their Greatest Hits	Release date: 1972; Label: Bell 1107; Formats: LP, 8 track, cassette	21	20	17	—	US: Gold
The World of the Partridge Family	Release date: 1974; Label: Bell 1319; Formats: LP, 8 track, cassette	—	—	—	—	
Greatest Hits	Release date: 1989; Label: Arista; Formats: CD	—	—	—	—	
The Definitive Collection	Release date: January 11, 2000; Label: Arista; Formats: CD	—	—	—	—	
Come On Get Happy!: The Very Best of The Partridge Family	Release date: May 3, 2005; Label: Sony Legacy; Formats: CD	—	—	—	—	
"—" denotes releases that did not chart.

== Singles ==
Titles (A-side, B-side) Both sides from same album except where indicated	Details	Peak chart positions							Certification	Album
Titles (A-side, B-side) Both sides from same album except where indicated	Details	US	US Cashbox	US AC	AUS	CAN	NZ	UK	Certification	Album
"I Think I Love You" b/w "Somebody Wants to Love You"	Release date: 1970; Label: Bell 910	1	1	8	1	1	5	18	US: Gold	The Partridge Family Album
"Doesn't Somebody Want to Be Wanted" b/w "You Are Always on My Mind"	Release date: 1971; Label: Bell 963	6	1	6	7	1	20	—	US: Gold	Up to Date
"I'll Meet You Halfway" b/w "Morning Rider on the Road"	Release date: 1971; Label: Bell 996	9	2	4	7	4	13	—		Up to Date
"I Woke Up in Love This Morning" b/w "Twenty Four Hours a Day"	Release date: 1971; Label: Bell 45,130	13	9	14	5	4	—	—		Sound Magazine
"It's One of Those Nights (Yes Love)" b/w "One Night Stand" (from Sound Magazine)	Release date: 1972; Label: Bell 45,160	20	13	2	21	6	—	11		Shopping Bag
"Am I Losing You" b/w "If You Ever Go"	Release date: 1972; Label: Bell 45,200	59	31	36	88	17	—	—		Shopping Bag
"Breaking Up Is Hard to Do" b/w "I'm Here, You're Here" (from Up to Date) (Note: Released as a maxi single in the UK with "I Think I Love You" / "I'll Meet You Halfway" on the B-side.)	Release date: 1972; Label: Bell 45,235	28	25	30	3	18	11	3		At Home with Their Greatest Hits
"Looking Through the Eyes of Love" b/w "Storybook Love"	Release date: 1972; Label: Bell 45,301	39	25	9	22	20	—	9		Notebook
"Friend and a Lover" b/w "Something's Wrong"	Release date: 1973; Label: Bell 45,336	99	92	—	80	—	—	—		Notebook
"Walking in the Rain" b/w "Together We're Better" (Note: "Walking in the Rain" was released only in the UK.)	Release date: 1973; Label: Bell 1293	—	—	—	—	—	—	10		Notebook
"Looking for a Good Time" b/w "Money Money"	Release date: 1973; Label: Bell 45,414	—	—	—	—	—	—	—		Bulletin Board
"—" denotes releases that did not chart or were not released in that territory.
