= Come On Get Happy!: The Very Best of The Partridge Family =

Come On, Get Happy!: The Very Best of The Partridge Family

Compilation album by The Partridge Family
- Released: May 3, 2005
- Recorded: 1970–1973
- Genre: Pop
- Length: 46:52
- Label: Arista
- Producer: Wes Farrell; Al Schmitt; Steve Douglas

The Partridge Family chronology
The Definitive Collection (2001)	Come On, Get Happy!: The Very Best of The Partridge Family (2005)

Come On, Get Happy!: The Very Best of The Partridge Family is a greatest hits compilation album from The Partridge Family released on May 3, 2005, in conjunction with the first season DVD collection. It contained some previously unreleased songs. During the course of the television series there were a number of recordings that were used on the program but never released on album or tape in stereo. Some were alternate mixes of released songs. These are known to fans as the "Lost Songs", four of which appear on this collection (tracks 4, 9, 10 and 12). They are noted as "new release" in the track listing below. Two of the songs appeared in the pilot episode of the show, tracks 9 and 12, listed below as having Ron Hicklin doing the vocals. Originally, the only cast member who was supposed to sing was Shirley Jones. After the producers heard David Cassidy's demos of the songs, however, they decided to let him sing after the first couple of episodes.

== Critical reception ==
Professional ratings
Review scores
Source	Rating
AllMusic	4/5 stars

Tim Sendra of AllMusic concludes his review with, "Whether the unreleased four songs belong on a" Very Best Of" collection is up for debate: On one hand it might have been better to add more songs that people remembered. but on the other it is nice to have the rarities unearthed. Either way, this is the best Partridge Family collection available."

== Track listing ==
No.	Title	Writer(s)	Original album	Length
1.	"C'mon Get Happy!"	Wes Farrell; Danny Janssen	theme song for the TV show	1:05
2.	"I Think I Love You"	Tony Romeo	The Partridge Family Album (1970)	2:51
3.	"I Woke Up In Love This Morning"	Irwin Levine; L. Russell Brown	Sound Magazine (1971)	2:41
4.	"Baby I Love, Love, Love You"	Errol Brown; Tony Wilson	New release	2:23
5.	"Point Me in the Direction of Albuquerque"	Tony Romeo	The Partridge Family Album	3:48
6.	"I Can Feel Your Heartbeat"	Mike Appel; Jim Cretecos; Wes Farrell	The Partridge Family Album	2:06
7.	"Echo Valley 2-6809"	Kathy Cooper; Rupert Holmes	Sound Magazine	3:00
8.	"Sunshine"	Bobby Hart; Danny Janssen; Wes Farrell	Crossword Puzzle (1973)	2:44
9.	"Let the Good Times In" (lead vocal by Ron Hicklin)	Carole Bayer Sager; Neil Sedaka	New release	2:53
10.	"Stephanie"	David Price; John Henning; Richard Klein	New release	2:38
11.	"I'll Meet You Halfway"	Gerry Goffin; Wes Farrell	Up to Date (1971)	3:50
12.	"Together (Havin' a Ball)" (lead vocal by Ron Hicklin)	Kelly Gordon; Shorty Rogers	New release	2:22
13.	"Doesn't Somebody Want to Be Wanted"	Mike Appel; Jim Cretecos; Wes Farrell	Up to Date	2:47
14.	"Looking Through the Eyes of Love"	Barry Mann; Cynthia Weil	The Partridge Family Notebook (1972)	3:05
15.	"It's One of Those Nights (Yes Love)"	Tony Romeo	Shopping Bag (1972)	3:36
16.	"Roller Coaster"	Mark James	Bulletin Board (1973)	2:23
17.	"Together We're Better"	Ken Jacobson; Tony Romeo	The Partridge Family Notebook	2:40
Total length:				46:52

== Musicians ==
- David Cassidy – Vocals (tracks 3, 7–8, 14–17)
- Shirley Jones – Vocals (tracks 3, 7–8, 14–17)
- Dennis Budimir – Guitar (tracks 2–8, 11, 13–17)
- Larry Carlton – Guitar (tracks 8, 14–17)
- Louis Shelton – Guitar (tracks 14, 17)
- Ben Benay – Guitar (track 16)
- Dean Parks – Guitar (track 16)
- Richard Bennett – Guitar (track 16)
- Louis Shelton – Guitar 2, 5–6, 10–11, 13, 15)
- Brendan Cahill – Guitar (tracks 4, 10)
- Don Peake – Guitar (track 4), Arranged By (tracks 2, 4–6)
- Al Casey – Guitar (tracks 9, 12)
- Mike Anthony – Guitar (tracks 9, 12)
- Tommy Tedesco – Guitar (tracks 2, 5–6, 8, 10, 14–15, 17)
- Joe Porcaro – Percussion (track 16)
- Chuck Findley – Horns (track 16)
- Tom Bahler – Horns (track 16), Vocals Arranged By (tracks 2, 4–6, 11, 13), Backing Vocals (tracks 3, 7–10, 14–15, 12, 17)
- John Bahler – Arranged By (track 16), Backing Vocals Arranged (tracks 3, 7–9, 14–15, 17), Vocals Arranged By (tracks 2, 4–6, 11, 13), Backing Vocals (tracks 3, 7–10, 12, 14–15, 17)
- Billy Strange – Arranged By (tracks 2, 4–6)
- Wes Farrell – Arranged By (tracks 2, 4–6), Rhythm Tracks Arranged By (tracks 3, 7–8, 11, 13–15, 17)
- Lenny Malaisky – Strings Leader (track 16)
- Jackie Ward – Vocals Arranged By (tracks 2, 4–6, 11, 13), Backing Vocals (tracks 3, 7–10, 12, 14–15, 17)
- Ron Hicklin – Vocals Arranged By (tracks 2, 4–6, 11, 13), Backing Vocals (tracks 3, 7–10, 12, 14–15, 17), Lead Vocals (tracks 9, 12)
- Stan Farber – Backing Vocals (tracks 9, 12)
- Shorty Rogers – Leader (tracks 9, 12)
- Joe Osborn – Bass (tracks 2, 4–6, 8, 10–11, 13–14, 17)
- Jim Hughart – Bass (track 16)
- Max Bennett – Bass (tracks 2–3, 5–9, 12, 14–17)
- Larry Knechtel – Keyboards (tracks 2, 5–6, 8, 14, 17), Piano (tracks 3, 7)
- Mike Melvoin – Keyboards (tracks 2, 4–6, 8, 10–11, 13–15, 17), Piano (tracks 3, 7), Arranged By (tracks 2, 4–6), Strings & Horns Arranged By (tracks 3, 7–8, 11, 13–15, 17)
- Larry Muhoberac – Keyboards (tracks 16–17)
- Michael Omartian – Keyboards (track 16)
- Lincoln Mayorga – Keyboards (tracks 9, 12)
- George Bohanon – Trombone (track 16)
- Lew McCreary – Trombone (track 16)
- Bill Perkins – Saxophone (track 16)
- Jackie Kelso – Saxophone (track 16)
- Bob Hardaway – Saxophone (track 16)
- Gary Coleman – Percussion (tracks 9, 12, 16)
- Jim Gordon – Drums (tracks 9, 12)
- Hal Blaine – Drums (tracks 2–8, 10–11, 13–17)

== Production ==
- Wes Farrell – Producer (tracks 2–8, 10–11, 13–17)
- Al Schmitt – Producer (tracks 9, 12)
- Steve Douglas – Producer (tracks 9, 12)
- Vic Anesini – Masterer
- Bob Kovach – Engineer (tracks 2–8, 11, 13–15, 17)
- Winston Wong – Assistant Engineer (tracks 8, 14–15, 17)
- Chris Theis – Mixed By (tracks: 4, 9, 10, 12)
- Abe Velez – Packaging Product Manager
- Howard Fritzson – Art Direction
- Rob Santos – Compilation Producer
- Detchapat Arttasan – Design
- Project Director – Mandana Eidgah
- Ken Sharp – Liner Notes

Track information and credits adapted the album's liner notes.
