= The World of the Partridge Family =

Compilation album by The Partridge Family
- Released: April 1974
- Recorded: 1970–1973 released in 1974
- Genre: Rock
- Length: 58:27
- Label: Bell
- Producer: Wes Farrell

The Partridge Family chronology
Bulletin Board (1973)	The World of the Partridge Family (1974)	Greatest Hits (1989)

Professional ratings
Review scores
Source	Rating
AllMusic	3/5 stars

The World of the Partridge Family is a greatest hits compilation album by The Partridge Family released in April 1974. This was their only two-record set as well as their last release on the Bell label, featuring 20 songs from the previous albums (except Christmas Card and Crossword Puzzle), including all their charted hits.

Shortly after this release, which did not chart, Bell Records was sold and renamed Arista. The album was renumbered as Arista 4021, but no new copies were printed. Existing copies were merely shipped under the new Arista code number. Only albums released in 1974 were renumbered; likewise, David Cassidy solo LP's were also renumbered.

== Track listing ==
All tracks in this compilation were featured on the TV show

Side one
No.	Title	Writer(s)	Original album	Length
1.	"I Think I Love You"	Tony Romeo	The Partridge Family Album (1970)	2:52
2.	"Point Me in the Direction of Albuquerque"	Tony Romeo	The Partridge Family Album	3:47
3.	"She’d Rather Have the Rain"	Terry Cashman; Tommy West	Up To Date (1971)	3:17
4.	"I Really Want to Know You"	Barry Mann; Cynthia Weil	The Partridge Family Album	2:55
5.	"It's One of Those Nights (Yes Love)"	Tony Romeo	Shopping Bag (1972)	3:36

Side two
No.	Title	Writer(s)	Original album	Length
1.	"Doesn't Somebody Want to Be Wanted"	Jim Cretecos; Mike Appel; Wes Farrell	Up To Date	2:46
2.	"Hello, Hello"	Tony Romeo; Wes Farrell	Shopping Bag	3:57
3.	"I Can Feel Your Heartbeat"	Jim Cretecos; Mike Appel; Wes Farrell	The Partridge Family Album	2:05
4.	"Echo Valley 2-6809"	Kathy Cooper; Rupert Holmes	Sound Magazine (1971)	3:05
5.	"Breaking Up Is Hard to Do"	Neil Sedaka; Howard Greenfield	At Home with Their Greatest Hits (1972)	2:30
Total length:				30:50

Side three
No.	Title	Writer(s)	Original album	Length
1.	"I'll Meet You Halfway"	Gerry Goffin; Wes Farrell	Up To Date	3:47
2.	"Oh No Not My Baby"	Gerry Goffin; Carole King	Bulletin Board (1973)	2:38
3.	"Brown Eyes"	Danny Janssen; Wes Farrell	Sound Magazine	2:44
4.	"Walking in the Rain"	Barry Mann; Cynthia Weil; Phil Spector	The Partridge Family Notebook (1972)	2:58
5.	"Only a Moment Ago"	Terry Cashman; Tommy West	The Partridge Family Album	2:33

Side four
No.	Title	Writer(s)	Original album	Length
1.	"I Woke Up in Love This Morning"	Irwin Levine; L. Russell Brown	Sound Magazine	2:41
2.	"Friend and a Lover"	Wes Farrell; Danny Janssen; Bobby Hart	The Partridge Family Notebook	2:29
3.	"Am I Losing You"	Irwin Levine; L. Russell Brown	Shopping Bag	2:22
4.	"Roller Coaster"	Mark James	Bulletin Board	2:22
5.	"Looking Through the Eyes of Love"	Barry Mann; Cynthia Weil	The Partridge Family Notebook	3:03
Total length:				27:37

== Production ==
- Wes Farrell – Producer
- Robert L. Heimall – Art Direction
- Richard Mantel – Design
- Gene Trindle – Photography
- Titles formerly on Bell 6050, 6059, 6064, 1107, 1111 and 1137.

Track information and credits adapted from the album's liner notes.
