= Greatest Hits (Partridge Family album) =

Compilation album by The Partridge Family

Greatest hits album by The Partridge Family
- Released: 1989
- Recorded: 1970–1973
- Genre: Rock
- Length: 46:46
- Label: Arista
- Producer: Wes Farrell

The Partridge Family chronology
The World of the Partridge Family (1974)	Greatest Hits (1989)	The Definitive Collection (2001)

Professional ratings
Review scores
Source	Rating
AllMusic	4.5/5 stars

Greatest Hits is a greatest hits album by The Partridge Family released by Arista in 1989. It contains 16 songs, including the TV show's second theme song, "Come on Get Happy" which was never featured on a Partridge family album, and two songs by David Cassidy as a solo act: "Cherish" and "Could It Be Forever". It has liner notes by Danny Bonaduce and a Partridge Family trivia quiz. The cover has a picture of a period lunchbox with a cartoon picture of the family in red velvet suits.

== Critical reception ==
Stephen Thomas Erlewine of AllMusic writes, "Although they weren't as good as The Cowsills, who served as at least partial inspiration for the group, The Partridge Family had their fair share of first-rate bubblegum singles in the early '70s. Greatest Hits does an excellent job of summarizing those glory days"

== Track listing ==
No.	Title	Writer(s)	Original album	Length
1.	"Come on Get Happy"	Wes Farrell; Danny Janssen	theme song for the TV show	1:05
2.	"I Think I Love You"	Tony Romeo	The Partridge Family Album (1970)	2:51
3.	"Doesn't Somebody Want to Be Wanted"	Jim Cretecos; Mike Appel; Wes Farrell	Up To Date (1971)	2:45
4.	"I'll Meet You Halfway"	Gerry Goffin; Wes Farrell	Up To Date	3:48
5.	"I Woke Up In Love This Morning"	Irwin Levine; L. Russell Brown	Sound Magazine (1971)	2:43
6.	"Cherish" (solo by David Cassidy)	Terry Kirkman	Cherish (1972)	3:46
7.	"It's One of Those Nights (Yes Love)"		Shopping Bag (1972)	3:49
8.	"I Can Feel Your Heartbeat"	Jim Cretecos; Mike Appel; Wes Farrell	The Partridge Family Album	2:05
9.	"Am I Losing You"	Irwin Levine; L. Russell Brown	Shopping Bag	2:22
10.	"Could It be Forever" (solo by David Cassidy)		Cherish	2:17
11.	"Point Me in the Direction of Albuquerque"	Tony Romeo	The Partridge Family Album	3:49
12.	"Echo Valley 2-6809"	Kathy Cooper; Rupert Holmes	Sound Magazine	3:00
13.	"Summer Days"	Tony Romeo	Sound Magazine	3:11
14.	"Looking Through the Eyes of Love"	Barry Mann; Cynthia Weil	The Partridge Family Notebook (1972)	3:05
15.	"How Long is Too Long"	Tom Bahler; Tony Asher	Bulletin Board (1973)	3:39
16.	"One Night Stand"	Paul Anka; Wes Farrell	Sound Magazine	3:02
Total length:				46:46

Track information and credits adapted the album's liner notes.
