= The Definitive Collection (Partridge Family album) =

Compilation album by David Cassidy & The Partridge Family
- Released: January 11, 2000
- Genre: Rock
- Length: 61:25
- Label: Arista
- Producer: Wes Farrell, David Cassidy, et al.

David Cassidy & The Partridge Family chronology
Greatest Hits (1989)	The Definitive Collection (2000)	Come On Get Happy!: The Very Best of The Partridge Family (2005)

Professional ratings
Review scores
Source	Rating
AllMusic	4.5/5 stars

The Definitive Collection is a 2000 greatest hits compilation album of 11 Partridge Family and 9 David Cassidy songs. A longer version included four additional David Cassidy tracks.

== Critical reception ==
Lindsay Planer of AllMusic concludes, "While earnest enthusiasts will probably choose to locate the individual reissues, for all non-completists and otherwise average fans, this Definitive Collection lives up to its name."

== Track listing ==
No.	Title	Writer(s)	Original album	Length
1.	"I Think I Love You"	Tony Romeo	The Partridge Family Album (1970)	2:51
2.	"I Woke Up In Love This Morning"	Irwin Levine; L. Russell Brown	Sound Magazine (1971)	2:41
3.	"I'll Meet You Halfway"	Wes Farrell; Gerry Goffin	Up to Date (1971)	3:47
4.	"Doesn't Somebody Want to Be Wanted"	Mike Appel; Jim Cretecos; Wes Farrell	Up to Date	2:47
5.	"Cherish" (David Cassidy solo)	Terry Kirkman	Cherish (1972)	3:47
6.	"It's One of Those Nights (Yes Love)"	Tony Romeo	Shopping Bag (1972)	3:35
7.	"Am I Losing You"	Irwin Levine; L. Russell Brown	Shopping Bag	2:23
8.	"I am a Clown" (David Cassidy solo)	Tony Romeo	Cherish	4:00
9.	"Could It Be Forever" (David Cassidy solo)	Wes Farrell; Danny Janssen	Cherish	2:19
10.	"How Can I Be Sure" (David Cassidy solo)	Felix Cavaliere; Eddie Brigati	Rock Me Baby (1972)	3:08
11.	"Breaking Up Is Hard to Do"	Howard Greenfield; Neil Sedaka	At Home with Their Greatest Hits (1972)	2:34
12.	"Rock Me Baby" (David Cassidy solo)	Johnny Cymbal; Peggy Clinger	Rock Me Baby	3:23
13.	"Point Me in the Direction of Albuquerque"	Tony Romeo	The Partridge Family Album	3:48
14.	"Looking Through the Eyes of Love"	Barry Mann; Cynthia Weil	The Partridge Family Notebook (1972)	3:04
15.	"Friend and a Lover"	Wes Farrell; Danny Janssen; Bobby Hart	The Partridge Family Notebook	2:31
16.	"Daydreamer" (David Cassidy solo)	Terry Dempsey	Dreams Are Nuthin' More Than Wishes (1973)	2:48
17.	"If I Didn't Care" (David Cassidy solo)	Jack Lawrence	Greatest Hits (1974)	3:06
18.	"Walking in the Rain"	Barry Mann; Cynthia Weil; Phil Spector	The Partridge Family Notebook	2:59
19.	"Some Kind of a Summer" (David Cassidy solo)	Dave Ellingson	Rock Me Baby	3:39
20.	"Please Please Me" (David Cassidy solo, longer version)	John Lennon; Paul McCartney	Greatest Hits	2:15
Total length:				61:25

Reissue bonus songs
No.	Title	Writer(s)	Original album	Length
21.	"The Puppy Song" (David Cassidy solo)	Harry Nilsson	Dreams Are Nuthin' More Than Wishes	2:46
22.	"Darlin'" (David Cassidy solo)	Brian Wilson; Mike Love	The Higher They Climb (1975)	3:16
23.	"Get It Up for Love" (David Cassidy solo)	Ned Doheny	The Higher They Climb	3:20
24.	"I Write the Songs" (David Cassidy solo)	Bruce Johnston	The Higher They Climb	3:42
Total length:				74:29

Track information and credits adapted AllMusic, and verified from the album's liner notes.
