= At Home with Their Greatest Hits =

Greatest hits album by The Partridge Family
- Released: September 1972
- Recorded: 1970–1972
- Genre: Pop
- Length: 31:56
- Label: Bell
- Producer: Wes Farrell

The Partridge Family chronology
Shopping Bag (1972)	At Home with Their Greatest Hits (1972)	The Partridge Family Notebook (1972)

Professional ratings
Review scores
Source	Rating
AllMusic	3/5 stars

At Home with Their Greatest Hits is a greatest hits album by The Partridge Family. Released in September 1972, it peaked at no. 21 on Billboard's Top LP's chart in early November 1972, and remained in the Top 200 for 23 weeks. The compilation features all six previously charted hits and four LP tracks from the previous albums, plus the album debut of the group's newest single. Released in June 1972, The Partridges' cover of Neil Sedaka's "Breaking Up Is Hard to Do" became their seventh charted hit (US no. 28/UK no. 3).

== Track listing ==
All tracks from the album were featured on the TV show (Seasons 1-3)

Side one
No.	Title	Writer(s)	Original album	Length
1.	"I Think I Love You"	Tony Romeo	The Partridge Family Album (1970)	2:52
2.	"I'll Meet You Halfway"	Wes Farrell; Gerry Goffin	Up to Date (1971)	3:47
3.	"It's One of Those Nights (Yes Love)"	Tony Romeo	Shopping Bag (1972)	3:47
4.	"Echo Valley 2-6809"	Rupert Holmes; Kathy Cooper	Sound Magazine (1971)	3:05
5.	"I Woke Up In Love This Morning"	L. Russell Brown; Irwin Levine	Sound Magazine	2:41
6.	"I Can Feel Your Heartbeat"	Mike Appel; Jim Cretecos; Wes Farrell	The Partridge Family Album	2:05

Side two
No.	Title	Writer(s)	Original album	Length
1.	"Doesn't Somebody Want to Be Wanted"	Mike Appel; Jim Cretecos; Wes Farrell	Up to Date	2:46
2.	"Am I Losing You"	L. Russell Brown; Irwin Levine	Shopping Bag	2:22
3.	"Brown Eyes"	Wes Farrell; Danny Janssen	Sound Magazine	2:44
4.	"She'd Rather Have the Rain"	Terry Cashman; Tommy West	Up to Date	3:17
5.	"Breaking Up Is Hard to Do"	Howard Greenfield; Neil Sedaka	New release	2:30
Total length:				31:56

== Fictional personnel (television) ==
- David Cassidy - electric and acoustic guitars, vocals
- Shirley Jones - vocals
- Susan Dey - Hammond organ, piano, vocals
- Danny Bonaduce - electric bass guitar, backing vocals
- Brian Forster - drums
- Suzanne Crough - tambourine

== Studio personnel ==
The actual musicians on the tracks included David Cassidy on lead vocals, Shirley Jones and the vocal group The Ron Hicklin Singers on backing vocals, and various prolific studio musicians such as Hal Blaine (drums), Larry Carlton (guitar), Joe Osborn (bass) and Larry Knechtel (keyboards) - arranged by Mike Melvoin.

== Charts ==
Chart (1972)	Peak position
US Billboard 200	21
