= The Flintstone Comedy Hour =

U.S. animated television series (1972–74)

- Genre: Comedy
- Directed by: William Hanna; Joseph Barbera
- Voices of: Alan Reed; Mel Blanc; Jean Vander Pyl; Gay Hartwig; Jay North; Mickey Stevens
- Country of origin: United States
- Original language: English
- No. of seasons: 1
- No. of episodes: 16

Production
- Producers: William Hanna; Joseph Barbera
- Camera setup: Dick Blundell; Tom Barnes; Ralph Migliori; Roy Wade; George Epperson
- Running time: 60 minutes (1972–73); 30 minutes (1973–74)
- Production companies: Hanna-Barbera Productions; Screen Gems

Original release
- Network: CBS
- Release: September 9 – December 30, 1972

Related
- The Pebbles and Bamm-Bamm Show; Fred Flintstone and Friends

The Flintstone Comedy Hour is an American animated television series and a spin-off of The Flintstones and The Pebbles and Bamm-Bamm Show, produced by Hanna-Barbera, which aired on CBS from September 9, 1972, to December 30, 1972. It was re-titled The Flintstone Comedy Show for a second season of reruns as a half-hour show from September 8, 1973, to January 26, 1974.

== Overview ==
The show's first half-hour featured two shorts with Fred and Barney, one short with the cast of The Pebbles and Bamm-Bamm Show, short jokes, horoscopes, and two songs performed by the new Pebbles and Bamm-Bamm band called The Bedrock Rockers; the second half-hour featured four new episodes and reruns of The Pebbles and Bamm-Bamm Show. The show also featured Moonrock, Penny, Wiggy, "Bad-luck" Schleprock, Cindy and Fabian, and the Bronto Bunch (Bronto, Noodles, Stub and Zonk) from The Pebbles and Bamm-Bamm Show.

Mickey Stevens replaced Sally Struthers as the voice of Pebbles in four new episodes of The Pebbles and Bamm-Bamm Show and in brief in-between segments, Struthers at the time being fully committed to her role as Gloria Stivic on the sitcom All in the Family. This was the final spin-off to feature Alan Reed as the voice of Fred Flintstone, before Reed's death in 1977.

For the 1973–74 television season, CBS dropped The Pebbles and Bamm-Bamm Show episodes and repackaged the first half-hour segments of The Flintstone Comedy Hour for a second season of reruns under the new title The Flintstone Comedy Show from September 8, 1973, to January 26, 1974. The "Fred & Barney" and "The Bedrock Rockers" segments were later featured on the syndicated weekday series Fred Flintstone and Friends in 1977–78. The program continued to air in rebroadcasts under The Flintstone Comedy Show title on USA Cartoon Express, Cartoon Network and Boomerang.

Like many animated series created by Hanna-Barbera in the 1970s, the show contained a laugh track created by the studio.

== The Bedrock Rockers ==
The Bedrock Rockers were Pebbles Flintstone (keyboard), Bamm-Bamm Rubble (bass, and drums), Moonrock Crater (drums, and clarinet), Penny Pillar (tambourine, and tuba) and Wiggy Rockstone (flute, and tubular bells). They performed two songs per episode which included:

1. "Sunshine Man"
2. "Summertime Girl"
3. "Oh, How I Love You"
4. "Keep in Time"
5. "It Should Always Be Saturday"
6. "Hop, Skip and a Jump"
7. "Flying So High"
8. "Yabba Dabba Doozie"
9. "Shadow, Shadow"
10. "Being with You"
11. "Singing Song"
12. "Song of the Seasons"
13. "What's Your Sign?"
14. "Sunny Sun Day"
15. "Rock N Roll Circus"
16. "I Love You, I Think I Love You"

The music was written by various Screen Gems staffers which, at the time, included David Gates (of Bread) penning the popular "Summertime Girl" and Tony Dancy (of Tony's Tygers) writing "Being With You" with Craig Fairchild & Jackie Mills. Mills also wrote "Sunshine Man" with Leonard Pettit and "Yabba Dabba Doozie" with Tom Jenkins. The actual group on the recordings were known as The Ron Hicklin Singers, featuring Tom Bahler on lead (he later penned the classic Michael Jackson song "She's Out of My Life"), John Bahler, Jackie Ward and Stan Farber. This lineup recorded on hundreds of commercials, TV themes and The Partridge Family recordings. Bahler's lead vocals are also prominent in The Love Generation, who issued a few LPs in the late 1960s.

== Episodes ==
Each episode contained two "Fred and Barney" segments with one "Pebbles and Bamm-Bamm" segment between them.

Four new episodes of The Pebbles and Bamm-Bamm Show were aired during the second half of The Flintstone Comedy Hour on September 9 and 16, but episodes were now shortened to two 11-minute segments in one 30-minute episode.

No.	Titles	Original release date
1	"Birdbrained / Bedrock 500 / Army Dazed The Pebbles and Bamm-Bamm Show: Squawkie Talkies / The Suitor Computer"	September 9, 1972
Birdbrained: When Mr. Slate and his wife go away for the weekend, Fred is asked to birdsit their pet parrot Claymore but the mischievous bird causes nothing but trouble for the Flintstones and the Rubbles.; Bedrock 500: Pebbles, Bamm-Bamm, Moonrock and their friends compete against the Bronto Bunch in the Bedrock 500 annual car race.; Army Dazed: Fred and Barney take part in a parade dressed in military uniforms, but then they accidentally end up in the real military where they are exposed to hard physical drill.; Squawkie Talkies: Pebbles and Bamm-Bamm are having fun with Moonrock's squawkie talkie device, talking to each other from great distances. But when Fred and Barney get hold of the devices, one of the squawkie talkies gets swallowed by a Hipposaurus—and Pebbles and Bamm-Bamm jump to the wrong conclusion when they hear Barney's voice coming from the Hippo's stomach.; The Suitor Computer: Moonrock invents a couples-matchmaking computer which he brings to Pebbles' party. Pebbles and Bamm-Bamm are certain the computer will designate them as an ideal couple but when Cindy sabotages the machine with a piece of chewing gum, it malfunctions and couples Pebbles and Bamm-Bamm with unlikely matches.
2	"The Flying Fools / The Stone Ranger Rides Again / The Galloping Gourmets The Pebbles and Bamm-Bamm Show: Bedlam in Bedrock / Beauty and the Beast"	September 16, 1972
The Flying Fools: Fred and Barney experience a turbulent afternoon while flying in Moonrock's new self-made airplane.; The Stone Ranger Rides Again: Pebbles and the gang shoot a western movie called "The Stone Ranger Rides Again" with Bamm-Bamm as the Stone Ranger who must save Pebbles' Pie Palace from ruin.; The Galloping Gourmets: Barney disguises himself as a cook to prepare a gourmet dinner for Mr. Slate who wants to impress an important client coming to the Flintstones' house.; Bedlam in Bedrock: Pebbles and Bamm-Bamm and the gang attempt to help DJ Rocky Rocket get his job back at ROCK radio station by collecting records from around town and with an "out-of-this-world" idea by disguising themselves as moon people. But when Fred and Barney see the moon people, they both panic and mistakenly believe that Bedrock has been invaded by martians.; Beauty and the Beast: Pebbles and Bamm-Bamm enter the Bedrock annual masquerade ball contest as Beauty and the Beast but chaos is inevitable when Cindy and Fabian show up wearing the same costumes. Meanwhile, a real gorillasaurus beast escapes from the Bedrock Zoo and ends up at the ball.
3	"Cat Burglars / The Circus Show / Pizza-Puss"	September 23, 1972
Cat Burglars: Fred and Barney are mistaken for cat burglars and innocently sent to jail, while the real thieves take advantage of the situation and break into the Flintstones' house.; The Circus Show: Pebbles & Bamm-Bamm and the gang organize a circus show to raise money for the school prom.; Pizza-Puss: Fred tries to become a pizza cook at Spumonistone Pizza Parlor when Pebbles needs 37 pizzas for her party.
4	"Fred Skirts the Issue / Hair Scare / The Not So Desperate Hours"	September 30, 1972
Fred Skirts the Issue: Fred and Barney help out as babysitters for the neighbors, but little Tina is scared of them and only calms down when Fred disguises himself as a woman.; Hair Scare: Pebbles & Bamm-Bamm and the gang accidentally use Moonrock's new miracle hair growing formula with disastrous hairy results.; The Not So Desperate Hours: Fingers O'Rock, the second most wanted criminal, escapes from prison and hides out at the Flintstones house.
5	"Don't Fence Me In / The Spot Remover / Cake Walk"	October 7, 1972
Don't Fence Me In: Fred and Barney disagree about the boundary line between their properties; at the land registry, they are told it runs right through Barney's living room.; The Spot Remover: Moonrock's "out-of-sight" spot remover accidentally causes bizarre scenes on the streets of Bedrock.; Cake Walk: Fred and Barney help their wives involuntarily to victory in a cake baking contest.
6	"The Loving Cup / Bedrock Surfers / Handicapped"	October 14, 1972
The Loving Cup: Fred is scheduled to present Mr. Slate with a loving cup at a business luncheon, but the cup accidentally gets stuck on Fred's head.; Bedrock Surfers: Pebbles & Bamm-Bamm, the gang and the Bronto Bunch participate in a couples-only surfing competition.; Handicapped: In order not to have to work on a Saturday, Fred tries to help Mr. Slate win a golf tournament at the Snobstone Country Club.
7	"Something Fishy / Amusement Park / A Pound in Time"	October 21, 1972
Something Fishy: Wilma and Betty decide to accompany their husbands on a fishing trip, much to the chagrin of Fred and Barney; but every time Fred and Barney try to spoil the day for their wives, it backfires.; Amusement Park: Pebbles & Bamm-Bamm and the gang spend a day at Stoney Island Amusement Park where they encounter a blowhard named Larry Limestone.; A Pound in Time: Fred and Barney struggle with weight issues and go to the Jack La Rock Health and Weight Control Center to try and fit back into their lodge uniforms.
8	"Dummy Up / Bedrock Radio Rock Festival / Barney the Swami"	October 28, 1972
Dummy Up: When Fred gets hit on the head with a baseball, he compulsively tells everyone what he really thinks about them and he also has to deliver a speech at the Bedrock Club.; Bedrock Radio Rock Festival: Pebbles & Bamm-Bamm and the gang record their songs on cassette for entry in the ROK Radio Rock Festival music contest.; Barney the Swami: When Barney suddenly develops unsuspected psychic powers, Fred drags him on television.
9	"High Noon at Bedrock Pass / Cinderellafella / Training Pains"	November 4, 1972
High Noon at Bedrock Pass: When Fred falls asleep in front of the TV, he dreams that he and Barney are in a western town where they confront escaped convict Two Chop McGurk.; Cinderellafella: Bamm-Bamm plays a male Cinderella in a school production of Cinderella.; Training Pains: Fred wants to train Dino for the Bedrock Pet Show and makes Dino undergo the Flintstone Crash Training Program.
10	"Fred's Big Brag / Schleprock's Cousin / Fred's Promise"	November 11, 1972
Fred's Big Brag: Fred brags to Barney, Pebbles & Bamm-Bamm that he can master the taming of a wild brontosaurus and ends up in the ring at the Bullosaurus Rodeo Show.; Schleprock's Cousin: When Bad-Luck Schleprock leaves on vacation, his twin cousin Shamrock comes to visit and brings good luck to everyone.; Fred's Promise: While on vacation with Wilma, Barney and Betty at Sandrock Beach, Fred promises not to talk about work – but his boss orders him to get a contract from a millionaire client staying at the same resort.
11	"The Big Breakup / Bedrock 300 / Candid Camerock"	November 18, 1972
The Big Breakup: While Barney and Fred are painting the Flintstones' living room, Dino causes an accident in which Barney suffers a broken bone and he has to recuperate for a week at Fred's house.; Bedrock 300: Pebbles & Bamm-Bamm participate in the Bedrock 300 car race where none of the participants do not respect the rules of fair play.; Candid Camerarock: Fred and Barney become victims of prankster TV show Candid Camerock when Fred says he deserves a raise at the quarry; afraid that Mr. Slate will see the show, he and Barney arrive at Slate's house pretending to be TV repairmen.
12	"Feet First / The Hobby Show / The Reluctant Candidate"	November 25, 1972
Feet First: At the Bedrock annual sports car rally, Fred wants to show Barney how to win but shortly after the start, they are easily overtaken by the other participants.; The Hobby Show: Pebbles & Bamm-Bamm and the gang organize a self-amateur handicraftsman exhibit of their respective hobbies.; The Reluctant Candidate: Fred and Barney are both running for the office of club president at the Water Buffalo Lodge and they mutually promise to support one another.
13	"Runaway Steaks / The Super Jumping Shoes / Citizen Flintstone"	December 2, 1972
Runaway Steaks: Fred is the proud owner of a new barbecue grill, but all goes wrong when he and Barney chase after their steaks on the runaway grill which ends up at Mr. Slate's garden party.; Super Colossal Jumping Shoes: Bamm-Bamm's school basketball team, in danger of losing an important game, is suddenly a success with the help of Moonrock's super colossal jumping shoes.; Citizen Flintstone: Fred makes a fool of himself when he guests as Bedrock's most typical citizen on The Johnny Sandstone Show.
14	"The Big Splash / Bedrock Beauty and Grooming Center / Stage Flight"	December 9, 1972
The Big Splash: Fred wants a swimming pool for the garden, but his dream comes to an abrupt end when a man from the building authority tells him that zone regulations prohibits the building of swimming pools in the area.; Bedrock Beauty and Grooming Center: Pebbles, Wiggy and Penny happily accept Moonrock's invitation to his new beauty and grooming center, but their experience is one disappointment after another.; Stage Flight: Fred agrees to play the starring role in Pebbles' school production of Peter Panrock but when Moonrock's anti-gravity suit machine short circuits, Fred goes on a turbulent flight all over Bedrock.
15	"Oil Fooled / Cave Buggy Race / Sherlock Flintstone"	December 16, 1972
Oil Fooled: The old billionaire Bludstone wants to buy Fred's house for $50,000, but Fred wants to be part of his multinational oil corporation.; Cave Buggy Race: Pebbles and her girlfriends disassemble Bamm-Bamm's cave buggy in individual parts and she participates in a car race with a zapped-up version.; Sherlock Flintstone: Due to a misunderstanding, Fred believes his cave mobile was stolen so he and Barney disgrace themselves as self-appointed detectives.
16	"Watch the Birdie / Schleprock / Mod Clod"	December 30, 1972
Watch the Birdie: Fred tries unsuccessfully as a professional photographer to shoot a rare red-headed pterodactyl in its natural habitat to win first prize of $500 in a magazine contest.; Schleprock: Pebbles & Bamm-Bamm and the gang are hired as servants in a restaurant, but chaos ensues when Bad-Luck Schleprock shows up.; Mod Clod: When Fred discovers his first grey hair, the midlife crisis hits him and he begins a ridiculous youth craze.

== Voice cast ==
- Alan Reed as Fred Flintstone
- Mel Blanc as Barney Rubble, Dino, Zonk, Stub
- Carl Esser as Fabian Fabquartz
- Gay Hartwig as Betty Rubble, Wiggy Rockstone, Cindy Curbstone
- Don Messick as Schleprock
- Mitzi McCall as Penny Pillar
- Jay North as Bamm-Bamm Rubble
- John Stephenson as Mr. Slate, Noodles
- Mickey Stevens as Pebbles Flintstone
- Jean Vander Pyl as Wilma Flintstone
- Lennie Weinrib as Moonrock Crater, Bronto
