= Up to Date =

Studio album by The Partridge Family
- Released: February 1971
- Recorded: 1970
- Studio: United Western (Hollywood)
- Genre: Pop
- Length: 31:34
- Label: Bell
- Producer: Wes Farrell

The Partridge Family chronology
The Partridge Family Album (1970)	Up to Date (1971)	Sound Magazine (1971)

Singles from Up to Date
- 1. "Doesn't Somebody Want to Be Wanted" Released: February 1971; 2. "I'll Meet You Halfway" Released: May 1971

Professional ratings
Review scores
Source	Rating
AllMusic	4/5 stars

Up to Date is the second studio album by The Partridge Family. Released in February 1971, just four months after the group's debut LP, the album entered Billboard's Top LP's chart in early April, having been certified gold on 25 March 1971. In its fourth week on the Top 200, the album improved on its predecessor (a no. 4 peak), reaching no. 3 (behind Janis Joplin's Pearl and Jesus Christ Superstar).

Up to Date yielded the two big pop hits "Doesn't Somebody Want to Be Wanted" (Billboard no. 6/Cash Box number one) and "I'll Meet You Halfway" (Billboard no. 9), which respectively reached the Top Ten of Billboard's Hot 100 in March and June.

In Canada, both "Doesn't Somebody Want to Be Wanted" and its parent album reached number one on the RPM charts.

== Recording and composition ==
As with all Partridge Family albums (with the exception of Bulletin Board), Up to Date was produced by Wes Farrell at United Western Recorders, Studio 2 in Los Angeles. As with the group's first album, it was engineered by Bob Kovach, with arrangements by Mike Melvoin.

Consistent with all of the Partridge Family's studio output, the album features musicians associated with iconic Los Angeles–based session players "the Wrecking Crew": Hal Blaine (drums), Joe Osborn (bass guitar), Mike Melvoin (keyboard), Dennis Budimir (guitar) and Louie Shelton (guitar). Once again, members of overlapping studio groups the Ron Hicklin Singers and the Love Generation – brothers John and Tom Bahler, Ron Hicklin and Jackie Ward – feature prominently as backing vocalists throughout the album.

The album features three songs written by "I Think I Love You" songwriter Tony Romeo, who contributed material to all eight of the Partridge Family's studio albums. The LP also includes five songs co-written by Wes Farrell, including three with prolific lyricist Gerry Goffin (former songwriting partner of Carole King). And two of the songs – including the hit "Doesn't Somebody Want to Be Wanted" – were co-written by Wes Farrell, Mike Appel and Jim Cretecos, whose five Partridge Family songs as a songwriting trio include "I Can Feel Your Heartbeat". Between 1972 and 1975 Appel worked as manager and producer for Bruce Springsteen.

Up to Date features David Cassidy's first contribution as a songwriter; with Wes Farrell he co-wrote the song "Lay It on the Line". The recording introduced a distorted guitar sound to the group's repertoire.

Cassidy publicly despised one of the LP's hits, "Doesn't Somebody Want to Be Wanted", and making it proved to be a very hard task. He did not think it was a good song and hated the idea of his having to talk in the middle of it so much so he initially refused to do it. This caused consternation with the studio and the record company, prompting the involvement of the heads of both Bell Records and Screen Gems, which at the time were the respective record and television divisions of the major Hollywood studio Columbia Pictures. Production shooting of the TV series was halted in order to provide a place in time where his manager and agent could talk to him over the issue. One of the things they said was about how many more copies of the record would be sold if it contained a speaking role from him. They put pressure on him until he caved in and did the record as requested. When it was finished, he was unsuccessful in trying to keep the record shelved in Bell's vaults. His feelings toward the song remained negative:

It was horrible, I was embarrassed by it. I still can't listen to that record.

The album's distinctive cover (overseen by Bell Records art director Beverly Weinstein) was designed in the form of a calendar indicating the birth dates of the family (including dog Simone), which were the actual birth dates of the cast members. The album also included a book cover. This was the last album to feature Jeremy Gelbwaks as Chris Partridge on the cover, as he left the show soon after the album's release.

== Track listing ==
All tracks from the album, except "Lay It on the Line" and "Morning Rider on the Road", were featured in the first season of the TV show.

Side one
No.	Title	Writer(s)	Length
1.	"I'll Meet You Halfway"	Wes Farrell; Gerry Goffin	3:47
2.	"You Are Always on My Mind"	Tony Romeo	2:53
3.	"Doesn't Somebody Want to Be Wanted"	Wes Farrell; Jim Cretecos; Mike Appel	2:46
4.	"I'm Here, You're Here"	Wes Farrell; Gerry Goffin	2:51
5.	"Umbrella Man"	Wes Farrell; Jim Cretecos; Mike Appel	2:44
6.	"Lay It on the Line"	David Cassidy; Wes Farrell	2:34

Side two
No.	Title	Writer(s)	Length
1.	"Morning Rider on the Road"	Tony Romeo	3:01
2.	"That'll Be the Day"	Tony Romeo	2:45
3.	"There's No Doubt in My Mind"	Wes Farrell; Gerry Goffin	2:29
4.	"She'd Rather Have the Rain"	Terry Cashman; T.P. West	3:17
5.	"I'll Leave Myself a Little Time"	Steve Dossick	2:27
Total length:			31:34

== Charts ==
Chart (1971–72)	Peak position
Australia (Kent Music Report)	10
UK Albums (Official Charts)	46
US Billboard 200	3

== Personnel ==
- David Cassidy – vocals
- Dennis Budimir, Louie Shelton – guitar
- Joe Osborn – bass
- Mike Melvoin – keyboards
- Hal Blaine – drums
- Bahler Brothers (tracks: A6 to B5), Jackie Ward, Ron Hicklin, Shirley Jones – background vocals
- John Bahler (tracks: A1 to A5), Stan Farber (tracks: A1 to A5) – uncredited background vocals

== Recording dates ==
May 16, 1970

- "That'll Be the Day"
- "She'd Rather Have the Rain"
- "I'll Leave Myself a Little Time"

November 12, 1970

- "I'll Meet You Halfway"
- "You Are Always on My Mind"
- "Doesn't Somebody Want to Be Wanted"
- "I'm Here, You're Here"
- "Umbrella Man"

November 13, 1970

- "Lay It on the Line"
- "Morning Rider on the Road"
- "There's No Doubt in My Mind"

See recording dates for this and other Partridge Family albums at The Partridge Family Recording Sessions
