= A Partridge Family Christmas Card =

Studio album by The Partridge Family
- Released: November 1971
- Recorded: 1971
- Studio: United Western (Hollywood)
- Genre: Rock/Christmas
- Length: 30:23
- Label: Bell
- Producer: Wes Farrell

The Partridge Family chronology
Sound Magazine (1971)	A Partridge Family Christmas Card (1971)	Shopping Bag (1972)

Alternative cover
- 1992 CD reissue cover

Professional ratings
Review scores
Source	Rating
AllMusic	3/5 stars

A Partridge Family Christmas Card is a Christmas album (and the fourth studio album) by the Partridge Family, released in November 1971. The album's case contains a reproduction of a Christmas card signed by the whole Partridge Family, the stars of a 1970s sitcom. The song "My Christmas Card to You" was original, but the remainder of the tracks were standards. Like most of the Partridge Family songs, the lead vocals are sung by David Cassidy, who played Keith Partridge in the show. The album also features one of the few Partridge Family recordings featuring Shirley Jones as the lead singer ("The Christmas Song").

A Partridge Family Christmas Card was the best-selling Christmas album in the United States during the Christmas season of 1971. It was the number 1 album on Billboard magazine's special Christmas Albums sales chart for all four weeks that the magazine published the chart that year.

The album was reissued in 1992 on CD and is also available as mp3 downloads.

Lead guitarist for Metallica, Kirk Hammett, cited this record to be the first album he owned during an appearance on "Jimmy Kimmel Live!"

== Track listing ==
Only two tracks, "Winter Wonderland" and "Have Yourself a Merry Little Christmas", were featured on the TV show (in the second-season episode "Don't Bring Your Guns to Town, Santa")

Side one
No.	Title	Writer(s)	Length
1.	"My Christmas Card to You"	Tony Romeo	2:33
2.	"White Christmas"	Irving Berlin	2:45
3.	"Santa Claus Is Coming to Town"	Haven Gillespie; J. Fred Coots	2:28
4.	"Blue Christmas"	Billy Hayes; Jay W. Johnson	3:27
5.	"Jingle Bells" (arranged by Wes Farrell)	James Lord Pierpont	2:54
6.	"The Christmas Song"	Mel Tormé; Robert Wells	2:30

Side two
No.	Title	Writer(s)	Length
1.	"Rockin' Around the Christmas Tree"	Johnny Marks	2:34
2.	"Winter Wonderland"	Richard B. Smith; Felix Bernard	2:19
3.	"Frosty the Snowman"	Jack Rollins; Steve Nelson	3:51
4.	"Sleigh Ride"	Leroy Anderson; Mitchell Parish	2:40
5.	"Have Yourself a Merry Little Christmas"	Hugh Martin; Ralph Blane	2:22
Total length:			30:23

== Personnel ==
- Dennis Budimir, Louie Shelton - guitar
- Max Bennett - bass
- Mike Melvoin - piano
- Hal Blaine - drums
- Jackie Ward, John Bahler, Ron Hicklin, Tom Bahler - background vocals
- Wes Farrell - arrangement of rhythm tracks
- John Bahler - arrangement of vocal background

Track list and credits verified from the album's liner notes.

== Recording dates ==
August 25, 1971

- "White Christmas"
- "Santa Claus Is Coming to Town"

August 26, 1971

- "Blue Christmas"
- "Jingle Bells"
- "Rockin' Around the Christmas Tree"
- "Winter Wonderland"
- "Frosty the Snowman"

August 28, 1971

- "My Christmas Card to You"
- "The Christmas Song"
- "Sleigh Ride"
- "Have Yourself a Merry Little Christmas"

See recording dates for this and other Partridge Family albums at The Partridge Family Recording Sessions

== Charts ==
Chart (1972)	Peak position
UK Albums (Official Charts)	45
