= Bulletin Board (album) =

Studio album by The Partridge Family
- Released: October 1973
- Genre: Rock, pop
- Length: 30:42
- Label: Bell
- Producer: Wes Farrell

The Partridge Family chronology
Crossword Puzzle (1973)	Bulletin Board (1973)	The World of the Partridge Family (1974)

Professional ratings
Review scores
Source	Rating
AllMusic	3.5/5 stars

Bulletin Board is the eighth and final studio album by The Partridge Family, released by Bell Records (catalog number 1137) in October 1973. The album was recorded between July and September 1973. Bulletin Board was the first Partridge Family album to fail to chart on Billboard's Top LP's chart. "Lookin' for a Good Time" b/w "Money Money" was released as a single in November 1973 (catalog number Bell 45-414), but failed to chart. This was the last regular U.S. Partridge Family single.

The album cover featured a handwritten track listing pinned to a bulletin board, as well as a "family" photograph and a memo detailing the show's new Saturday night time slot. According to the liner notes for the CD release, the album cover was created within only a few hours due to time constraints. While Wes Farrell is credited as producer on the album, in fact it was produced and arranged by John Bahler (also spelled as Bähler), a member of late-1960 pop group the Love Generation and, later, the Ron Hicklin Singers, several members of whom provided backing vocals on all of the Partridge Family albums. Bulletin Board is the only Partridge Family album recorded in a studio different from the preceding albums (which had all been recorded at Western Recorders, Studio 2 in Los Angeles).

Reviewer Dave Thompson of AllMusic gave the album a rating of 3½ stars out of 5, claiming it was more representative of David Cassidy's solo material than the typical Partridge Family album: "the performances all lean a lot closer towards the Cassidy solo ideal – soft ballads, tight rockers – than the all-for-one harmonies and joy that characterized the Partridges' earlier releases." Howard Pattow, a member of the Partridge Family tribute band Sound Magazine, states that "the music here is groovy and funky, a definite reflection of pop music's embrace of disco ... overall, the music on Bulletin Board is quite different from previous Partridge Family efforts ... [and] features musicians that had previously not appeared on a Partridge record."

In September 2008 Collectors' Choice Music reissued the album on CD. Initially the disc was available exclusively through the company's website. The disc contains two bonus tracks: both sides of the Bones Howe-produced Shirley Jones single "Ain't Love Easy"/"Roses in the Snow", originally released in October 1972.

== Track listing ==
All tracks from the original album, except "Where Do We Go From Here", were featured in the fourth and final season of the TV show

Side one
No.	Title	Writer(s)	Length
1.	"Money Money"	Wes Farrell; Danny Janssen; Bobby Hart	2:31
2.	"Roller Coaster"	Mark James	2:22
3.	"Lookin' for a Good Time"	Wes Farrell; Danny Janssen; Bobby Hart	2:12
4.	"Oh No Not My Baby"	Gerry Goffin; Carole King	2:38
5.	"I Wouldn't Put Nothin' over on You"	Wes Farrell; Danny Janssen; Bobby Hart	2:51
6.	"Where Do We Go From Here?"	Mark James	2:36

Side two
No.	Title	Writer(s)	Length
1.	"How Long Is Too Long"	Tom Bahler; Tony Asher	3:41
2.	"I'll Never Get over You"	Tony Romeo	2:59
3.	"Alone Too Long"	Mark James; Cynthia Weil	3:10
4.	"I Heard You Singing Your Song"	Barry Mann	2:38
5.	"That's The Way It Is with You"	Harriet Schock	3:04
Total length:			30:42

CD bonus tracks
No.	Title	Writer(s)	Length
1.	"Ain't Love Easy" (solo track by Shirley Jones)	Carol Hall	3:13
2.	"Roses in the Snow" (solo track by Shirley Jones)	Randy McNeill	2:57
Total length:			36:52

== Personnel ==
Produced by Wes Farrell for Coral Rock Productions, Inc.

- Partridge Family vocals by Shirley Jones and David Cassidy
- Hal Blaine - drums
- Max Bennett, Jim Hughart - bass
- Larry Carlton, Richard Bennett, Ben Benay, Dean Parks - guitar
- Chuck Findley, Tom Bahler - horns
- Lou McCreary, George Bohanon - trombone
- Bill Perkins, Jackie Kelso, Bob Hardaway - saxophone
- Gary Coleman, Joe Porcaro - percussion
- Michael Omartian, Larry Muhoberac - keyboards
- John Bahler, Tom Bahler, Jackie Ward, Ron Hicklin - backing vocals

Bonus tracks produced by Bones Howe.

== Recording dates ==
July 25, 1973:

- "Money, Money"
- "I'll Never Get Over You"
- "Alone Too Long"
- "Oh No Not My Baby"

July 26, 1973:

- "I Wouldn't Put Nothing Over On You"

September 4, 1973:

- "I Heard You Singing Your Song"
- "Roller Coaster"
- "Lookin' For A Good Time"
- "How Long Is Too Long"

September 5, 1973:

- "That's The Way It Is With You"
- "Where Do We Go From Here"
