= Summer Days (Tony Romeo song) =

Single by Lou Christie
- B-side: "The One and Only Original Sunshine Kid"
- Released: 1975 (U.S.)
- Length: 3:17
- Label: Bell; Elektra
- Songwriter: Tony Romeo
- Producer: Tony Romeo

Lou Christie singles chronology
"Good Mornin'"/"Zip-a-Dee-Doo-Dah" (1975)	"Summer Days" (1975)	"Riding in My Van" (1976)

"Summer Days" is a song written by Tony Romeo. The song was originally recorded in 1971 by The Partridge Family on their Sound Magazine album, but was not released as a single.

== Lou Christie cover ==
Lou Christie recorded "Summer Days" in 1975. It was released as a non-album single.

The song reached No. 89 on the Record World chart and No. 112 on Cash Box.

=== Chart history ===
Chart (1975)	Peak position
U.S. Cash Box Top 100	112
U.S. Record World	89

== Other versions ==
David Cassidy recorded a solo version of "Summer Days" on his 1973 LP Dreams Are Nuthin' More Than Wishes.
