= The Partridge Family Album =

Studio album by The Partridge Family
- Released: October 1970
- Recorded: 1970
- Studio: United Western (Hollywood)
- Genre: Pop
- Length: 30:02
- Label: Bell
- Producer: Wes Farrell

The Partridge Family chronology
| The Partridge Family Album (1970) | Up to Date (1971) |

Singles from The Partridge Family Album
- 1. "I Think I Love You" Released: August 22, 1970

Professional ratings
Review scores
| Source | Rating |
|---|---|
| AllMusic | 4/5 stars |

The Partridge Family Album is the first of eight studio albums by The Partridge Family. The LP was released in October 1970, a month after the debut of the ABC-TV musical sitcom The Partridge Family starring Shirley Jones and featuring David Cassidy, both of whom feature on the album, as do studio backing vocalists and session musicians. The success of the album – which in early January 1971 reached no. 4 on Billboard's Top LP's chart – was bolstered not only by the hit TV show but by the album's one single release, the massive hit "I Think I Love You", which for three weeks in November and December 1970 topped Billboard's Hot 100 and which NARM declared best-selling single of 1970.

The album did not chart in the UK – the TV series did not debut in Great Britain until September 1971 – but reached no. 6 in Canada on the RPM 100 national album chart.

The album was produced by Wes Farrell and engineered by Bob Kovach, with arrangements by Mike Melvoin, Billy Strange, Wes Farrell and Don Peake. As with all of the Partridge Family's studio output, the album features musicians associated with iconic Los Angeles–based session players "the Wrecking Crew": Dennis Budimir, Louie Shelton, Tommy Tedesco, Joe Osborn, Max Bennett, Larry Knechtel, Mike Melvoin and Hal Blaine.

Members of overlapping studio groups the Ron Hicklin Singers and the Love Generation – brothers John and Tom Bahler (also spelled Bähler), Ron Hicklin and Jackie Ward – feature prominently as backing vocalists throughout the album, as they do on all successive Partridge Family albums. Also, their blended harmonies dominate the album's two tracks that do not include David Cassidy: "I'm on the Road" and "I Really Want to Know You", both written by Barry Mann and Cynthia Weil. And on "To Be Lovers" they perform the verse, with Cassidy singing only the bridge. Originally the Bahler brothers, Hicklin and Ward were solely responsible for the Partridge Family sound. But with the revelation that David Cassidy could sing professionally, Wes Farrell promoted Cassidy to lead singer.

The album features songs by Tony Romeo, Wes Farrell, songwriting partners Terry Cashman and Tommy West, and afore-mentioned songwriting duo Barry Mann and Cynthia Weil.

The album's cover was designed to look like an old-fashioned photo album. The album's back cover features a picture of the whole TV family alongside solo portraits of David Cassidy and Shirley Jones. Certain copies included a label promoting the LP's inclusion of "I Think I Love You"; this was embedded in the front cover artwork (and not on the protective plastic). The original release of the album included a framed color photograph of the group.

== Track listing ==
All tracks from the album were featured in first-season episodes of the TV show. Curiously, the show's theme song is nowhere to be found on this album or any of the other original albums, only later surfacing on their Greatest Hits album.

Side one
| No. | Title | Writer(s) | Length |
|---|---|---|---|
| 1. | "Brand New Me" | Wes Farrell; Eddie Singleton | 2:38 |
| 2. | "Point Me in the Direction of Albuquerque" | Tony Romeo | 3:51 |
| 3. | "Bandala" | Wes Farrell; Eddie Singleton | 2:27 |
| 4. | "I Really Want to Know You" | Barry Mann; Cynthia Weil | 2:57 |
| 5. | "Only a Moment Ago" | Terry Cashman; Tommy West | 2:37 |
| 6. | "I Can Feel Your Heartbeat" | Wes Farrell; Jim Cretecos; Mike Appel | 2:06 |

Side two
| No. | Title | Writer(s) | Length |
|---|---|---|---|
| 1. | "I'm on the Road" | Barry Mann; Cynthia Weil | 2:53 |
| 2. | "To Be Lovers" | Mark Charron | 2:48 |
| 3. | "Somebody Wants to Love You" | Wes Farrell; Jim Cretecos; Mike Appel | 2:37 |
| 4. | "I Think I Love You" | Tony Romeo | 2:55 |
| 5. | "Singing My Song" | Wes Farrell; Diane Hildebrand | 2:13 |
| Total length: | | | 30:02 |

== Personnel ==
- David Cassidy, Shirley Jones – vocals
- Dennis Budimir, Louie Shelton, Tommy Tedesco – guitar
- Joe Osborn, Max Bennett – bass
- Larry Knechtel, Mike Melvoin – keyboards
- Hal Blaine – drums
- Ron Hicklin – vocal arrangements, vocals
- John Bahler – vocals
- Tom Bahler – vocals
- Jackie Ward – vocals

== Recording dates ==
May 11, 1970

- "Somebody Wants To Love You"
- "I Think I Love You"

May 16, 1970

- "I Really Want to Know You"
- "Only a Moment Ago"
- "I'm on the Road" (See June 11, 1970)
- "Singing My Song" (See June 11, 1970)

June 11, 1970

- "I'm on the Road" (Re-Record, see May 16, 1970)
- "Singing My Song" (Re-Record, see May 16, 1970)

August 4, 1970

- "Point Me in the Direction of Albuquerque"
- "I Can Feel Your Heartbeat"
- "To Be Lovers"

August 5, 1970

- "Brand New Me"
- "Bandala"

See recording dates for this and other Partridge Family albums at The Partridge Family Recording Sessions

== Charts ==
Chart peaks for The Partridge Family Album
| Chart (1970–1971) | Peak position |
|---|---|
| US Billboard Top LPs | 4 |
| Australia (Kent Music Report) | 30 |

== Certifications ==
| Region | Certification | Certified units/sales |
|---|---|---|
| United States (RIAA) | Gold | 500,000^{^} |
^{^} Shipments figures based on certification alone.
