= Shopping Bag =

Studio album by The Partridge Family
- Released: March 1972
- Studio: United Western (Hollywood)
- Genres: Psychedelic pop, bubblegum pop
- Length: 33:36
- Label: Bell
- Producer: Wes Farrell

The Partridge Family chronology
A Partridge Family Christmas Card (1971)	Shopping Bag (1972)	At Home with Their Greatest Hits (1972)

Singles from Shopping Bag
- 1. "It's One of Those Nights (Yes Love)" Released: December 1971

Professional ratings
Review scores
Source	Rating
AllMusic	2.5/5 stars

Shopping Bag is the fifth studio album by TV-linked pop project The Partridge Family. Released in March 1972, just as the second season of the TV series was finishing in North America, the album entered Billboard's Top LP's chart in late March, peaking at no. 18 in late April. The album remained in the Top 200 for 17 weeks and was certified gold. The vinyl release of the album contained a novelty plastic shopping bag.

Consistent with all of the Partridges' eight studio albums, the record was produced by Wes Farrell for Coral Rock Productions, and released on Bell Records. Farrell arranged the rhythm tracks, and Mike Melvoin arranged the strings and horns. The disc was engineered by Bob Kovach, with assistant engineer Winston Wong. As with all of the group's releases, the album features some of the era's most highly regarded studio musicians, better known as "the Wrecking Crew": Hal Blaine (drums), Mike Melvoin (keyboards), Dennis Budimir (guitar), Louie Shelton (guitar), Larry Carlton (guitar), Tommy Tedesco (guitar) and Max Bennett (bass). And once again members of the Ron Hicklin Singers – brothers John and Tom Bahler, Ron Hicklin and Jackie Ward – feature prominently as backing vocalists throughout the album, with arrangements by John Bahler.

As with most Partridge Family releases, several known songwriters contributed songs to the album including duo Tommy Boyce and Bobby Hart – best known for major hits written for The Monkees, a similar project which also combined a prime-time television series about a part-fictional/part-real musical group with a series of music albums – and two other songwriting duos: Irwin Levine and L. Russell Brown ("Knock Three Times", "Tie a Yellow Ribbon Round the Ole Oak Tree"), and Terry Cashman and Tommy West. Producer Wes Farrell co-wrote four of the album’s songs, and Shopping Bag ’s one big hit single, It's One of Those Nights (Yes Love) (US no. 20/UK no. 11), was written by Tony Romeo, who had written the Partridge Family’s signature hit, the 1970 US number one I Think I Love You".

The album’s one other US single release, “Am I Losing You”, stalled at no 59, with seven weeks on Billboard's Hot 100.

Lead singer David Cassidy contributed one song, "There'll Come a Time" – his third composition to feature on a Partridge Family album. It was also his last, as Cassidy's later songwriting efforts all would be reserved for his solo albums. 1972 was a watershed year for Cassidy in terms of his phenomenal solo career in the UK, where “It’s One of Those Nights (Yes Love)” was the first of four consecutive major Partridge Family hits, coinciding with even bigger UK solo hits for Cassidy during 1972 and 1973.

== Track listing ==
All tracks from the album were featured on the TV show, mainly in Seasons 2 and 3

Side one
No.	Title	Writer(s)	Length
1.	"Girl, You Make My Day"	Tommy Boyce; Bobby Hart	3:11
2.	"Every Little Bit o' You"	Irwin Levine; L. Russell Brown	3:02
3.	"Something New Got Old"	Wes Farrell; Bobby Hart	2:54
4.	"Am I Losing You"	Irwin Levine; L. Russell Brown	2:22
5.	"Last Night"	Wes Farrell; Tony Romeo	2:43
6.	"It's All in Your Mind"	Johnny Cymbal; Peggy Clinger	2:21

Side two
No.	Title	Writer(s)	Length
1.	"Hello, Hello"	Wes Farrell; Tony Romeo	3:57
2.	"There'll Come a Time"	David Cassidy	2:49
3.	"If You Ever Go"	Wes Farrell; Tony Romeo	3:21
4.	"Every Song Is You"	Terry Cashman; Tommy West	3:32
5.	"It's One of Those Nights (Yes Love)"	Tony Romeo	3:24
Total length:			33:36

== Charts ==
Chart (1972)	Peak position
Australia (Kent Music Report)	45
UK Albums (Official Charts)	28
US Billboard 200	18

== Recording dates ==
25 August 1971

- "Last Night"
- "Hello, Hello"
- "Ev’ry Little Bit o’ You"

4 September 1971

- "If You Ever Go"
- "It's One Of Those Nights (Yes Love)"
- "Every Song Is You"

16 December 1971

- "Something New Got Old"
- "There’ll Come A Time"
- "It’s All in Your Mind"
- "Girl, You Make My Day"

See recording dates for this and other Partridge Family albums at The Partridge Family Recording Sessions
