= Sound Magazine =

Studio album by The Partridge Family
- Released: August 1971
- Recorded: 1971
- Studio: United Western (Hollywood)
- Genre: Rock, pop
- Length: 32:58
- Label: Bell
- Producer: Wes Farrell

The Partridge Family chronology
Up to Date (1971)	Sound Magazine (1971)	A Partridge Family Christmas Card (1971)

Singles from Sound Magazine
- 1. "I Woke Up in Love This Morning" Released: August 1971

Professional ratings
Review scores
Source	Rating
AllMusic	4/5 stars

The Partridge Family Sound Magazine is the third studio album by TV-linked pop project The Partridge Family. Released in August 1971 before the start of the second season of the US TV series, it was their third hit album in ten months. In late September 1971, in its fifth week on Billboard's Top LP's chart, the album reached its no. 9 chart peak. In that same week the album's one hit single release, "I Woke Up In Love This Morning", peaked at no. 13 on Billboard's Hot 100. The LP was certified gold that same month. Sound Magazine is nearly universally regarded – by both fans and critics – as the Partridge Family's consummate pop album.

Sound Magazine was the only Partridge Family album to crack the UK Top 20. It peaked at no. 14 in April 1972, coinciding with the chart climb of David Cassidy's smash double A-sided UK solo debut hit "Could It Be Forever"/"Cherish" (UK no. 2). The album dropped out of the UK Top 40 in the same late May 1972 week in which both that single and its parent album Cherish peaked at no. 2 in their respective charts.

On Billboard's Top LP's chart, Sound Magazine overlapped with the 6 November 1971 – 22 January 1972 Hot 100 chart run of Cassidy's US debut solo hit "Cherish" (US no. 9). The album remained in the Top 30 throughout the single's chart run, then slipped following the single's disappearance from the Hot 100.

Like all of the Partridges' eight studio albums, the record was produced by Wes Farrell for Coral Rock Productions, and released on Bell Records. Farrell arranged the rhythm tracks, and Mike Melvoin arranged the strings and horns. The disc was engineered by Bob Kovach. As with all of the group's releases, the album features some of the era's most highly regarded studio musicians, better known as "the Wrecking Crew": Hal Blaine (drums), Mike Melvoin (piano), Larry Knechtel (piano), Dennis Budimir (guitar), Louie Shelton (guitar) and Max Bennett (bass). And once again members of the Ron Hicklin Singers – brothers John and Tom Bahler, Ron Hicklin and Jackie Ward – feature prominently as backing vocalists throughout the album, with arrangements by John Bahler.

As with most Partridge Family releases, many well-known songwriters contributed songs to the album, including Paul Anka, Rupert Holmes, Tony Romeo and Bobby Hart. The last had also contributed songs to The Monkees, a similar project that also combined a prime-time television series about a part-fictional/part-real musical group with a series of music albums.

Wes Farrell co-wrote five of the album's songs including the final track, "Love Is All That I Ever Needed", written with lead vocalist David Cassidy. This was Cassidy's second composition to feature on a Partridge Family album.

In the mythos of Partridge Family lore, they also recorded a watered-down version of the relatively racy "I'll Be Your Magician", penned by Irwin Levine and L. Russell Brown. The track was ultimately discarded and never released, although Danny Bonaduce, who played Danny in the TV series, recorded the song for his 1973 solo album.

Cassidy recorded a reworked version of Sound Magazine's "Summer Days" for his third solo album, Dreams Are Nuthin' More Than Wishes (UK number one, 1973).

The cover of the album was the first to feature child actor Brian Forster, who had replaced Jeremy Gelbwaks as Chris Partridge in the TV series.

In the posthumously broadcast 2018 TV documentary David Cassidy: The Last Session, produced by Left/Right Productions for A&E and documenting the star's final recording session alongside his struggle with alcoholism, a copy of the LP is seen propped up in the studio close to where Cassidy is recording his vocals.

== Track listing ==
All tracks from the album were featured on the TV show, mainly from Season 2

Side one
No.	Title	Writer(s)	Length
1.	"One Night Stand"	Wes Farrell; Paul Anka	3:06
2.	"Brown Eyes"	Wes Farrell; Danny Janssen	2:48
3.	"Echo Valley 2-6809"	Kathy Cooper; Rupert Holmes	3:08
4.	"You Don't Have to Tell Me"	Tony Romeo	2:57
5.	"Rainmaker"	Wes Farrell; Jim Cretecos; Mike Appel	2:31
6.	"I'm on My Way Back Home"	Bobby Hart; Jack Keller	3:36

Side two
No.	Title	Writer(s)	Length
1.	"Summer Days"	Tony Romeo	3:15
2.	"I Would Have Loved You Anyway"	Tony Romeo	2:37
3.	"Twenty-Four Hours a Day"	Wes Farrell; Danny Janssen	3:19
4.	"I Woke Up In Love This Morning"	Irwin Levine; L. Russell Brown	2:44
5.	"Love Is All That I Ever Needed"	Wes Farrell; David Cassidy	2:57
Total length:			32:58

== Charts ==
Chart (1971–72)	Peak position
Australia (Kent Music Report)	18
UK Albums (OCC)	14
US Billboard 200	9

== Personnel ==
- David Cassidy, Shirley Jones - vocals
- Dennis Budimir, Louis Shelton - guitar
- Max Bennett - bass
- Larry Knechtel, Mike Melvoin - piano
- Hal Blaine - drums
- Jackie Ward, John Bähler, Ron Hicklin, Tom Bähler - background vocals

== Recording dates ==
May 4, 1971

- "Brown Eyes"
- "Echo Valley 2-6809"
- "Rainmaker"
- "I'm on My Way Back Home"
- "I Would Have Loved You Anyway"

May 5, 1971

- "One Night Stand"
- "You Don't Have to Tell Me"
- "Twenty-Four Hours a Day"
- "I Woke Up In Love This Morning"

May 11, 1971

- "Love Is All That I Ever Needed"

May 13, 1971

- "Summer Days" (see June 7, 1971)

June 7, 1971

- "Summer Days" (Re-Record, see May 13, 1971)

See recording dates for this and other Partridge Family albums at The Partridge Family Recording Sessions
