= Jeremy Gelbwaks =

American actor (born 1961)

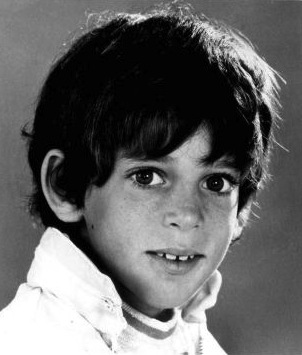
- Gelbwaks, c. 1970
- Born: Jeremy Russell Gelbwaks; May 22, 1961 (age 65); Los Angeles, California, U.S.
- Occupation: Technology Planner
- Years active: 1970–1971

Jeremy Russell Gelbwaks (born May 22, 1961) is an American former child actor who was featured in the television series The Partridge Family (1970–71).

== Career ==
Gelbwaks was born in Los Angeles, California, and was the first actor to play the role of Chris Partridge. He left the series after the first season, and was replaced by Brian Forster in the summer of 1971. According to his Partridge Family castmate David Cassidy, Gelbwaks "had a personality conflict with every person in the cast, and with the producers." In a 2005 interview with the Television Academy Foundation, Shirley Jones mentioned that Gelbwaks "was not happy doing [the show] ... his parents wanted him to do it, so we replaced him."

Gelbwaks retired from acting when his family moved from California to Reston, Virginia, a suburb of Washington, D.C., where they resided for a year-and-a-half before moving again to Connecticut and later to Potsdam, New York. Gelbwaks graduated from Hermon Dekalb Central School (Dekalb Junction, N.Y.) in 1978 and was a member of the National Honor Society. His father Norman taught computer science at the State University of New York at Potsdam.

Gelbwaks graduated from Potsdam College in 1983, and became a computer analyst while studying chemistry at UC Berkeley. He worked in the computer industry until 1999, studied business at Columbia University, and became a management consultant. He married Patricia Polander and moved to New Orleans where he works as a business and technology planner.
