= I Think I Love You =

Original song written and composed by Tony Romeo

Single by the Partridge Family

from the album The Partridge Family Album
- B-side: "Somebody Wants to Love You"
- Released: August 22, 1970
- Recorded: 1970
- Studio: United Western (Hollywood, California)
- Genre: Baroque pop; bubblegum pop; soft rock
- Length: 2:54
- Label: Bell
- Songwriter: Tony Romeo
- Producer: Wes Farrell

The Partridge Family singles chronology
"I Think I Love You" (1970)	"Doesn't Somebody Want to Be Wanted" (1971)

Audio
- "I Think I Love You" on YouTube

"I Think I Love You" is a song by Tony Romeo, written as the debut single for fictional musical TV family the Partridge Family. It was released in August 1970, a month prior to the debut of the ABC-TV musical sitcom The Partridge Family starring Shirley Jones and featuring David Cassidy, both of whom appear on the record, with Cassidy as lead vocalist. The single topped Billboard's Hot 100 for three weeks in November and December 1970 and later was certified by NARM as the best-selling single of 1970.

The single also reached number one in Canada on the RPM 100 national Top Singles chart in November 1970, and in 1971 peaked at number one in Australia.

== Background and release ==
The single, which was produced by Wes Farrell and issued on Bell Records, featured twice on the TV show during the record's seven-week climb to number one on Billboard's Hot 100. Cassidy lip-synched his performance, as he did for all songs throughout the four-year series. As with all of the Partridge Family's studio output, the single features musicians associated with iconic Los Angeles–based session players "the Wrecking Crew": Dennis Budimir, Louie Shelton, Tommy Tedesco, Joe Osborn, Max Bennett, Larry Knechtel, Mike Melvoin, and Hal Blaine. And members of overlapping studio groups the Ron Hicklin Singers and the Love Generation – brothers John and Tom Bahler (also spelled Bähler), Ron Hicklin, and Jackie Ward – feature as backing vocalists, as they do on all successive Partridge Family recordings.

Cash Box said of the song that "attractive sound side and material curries favorable attention from all types of pop programmers."

Four million copies of the single release were sold.

The Partridge Family version is used prominently throughout the 2020 DreamWorks Animation film The Croods: A New Age, with a cover version performed by Tenacious D featured during the ending credits. The Partridge Family version was also used in the 1999 comedy horror Lake Placid.

=== Personnel ===
According to the AFM contract sheet, the following musicians played on the track.

- Billy Strange – session leader, arrangement
- Hal Blaine – drums, contractor
- Dennis Budimir – guitars
- Gary Coleman – percussion
- Larry Knechtel – keyboards
- Joe Osborn – bass guitar
- Louis Shelton – guitar

== Charts ==
=== Weekly charts ===
Chart (1970–1971)	Peak position
Australia (Kent Music Report)	1
Canada Top Singles (RPM)	1
Canada Adult Contemporary (RPM)	10
Ireland (IRMA)	2
New Zealand (Listener)	5
South Africa (Springbok Radio)	4
UK Singles (OCC)	18
US Billboard Hot 100	1
US Easy Listening (Billboard)	8
US Cash Box Top 100	1

Chart (1972)	Peak position
Netherlands (Single Top 100)	1

=== Year-end charts ===
Chart (1970)	Rank
Australia	76
Canada (RPM)	2

Chart (1971)	Rank
Australia	14

Chart (1972)	Rank
Netherlands (Single Top 100)	7

== Certifications ==
Region	Certification	Certified units/sales
United States (RIAA)	Gold	1,000,000^{^}
^{^} Shipments figures based on certification alone.

== Andy Williams version ==
In 1971 American singer Andy Williams released Love Story, an album made up almost entirely of cover versions. His own version of “I Think I Love You” was included on the album. Confusingly, the album was retitled Home Lovin’ Man for its UK release, and an entirely different album with the title “Love Story” made an appearance there.

== Voice of the Beehive version ==
"I Think I Love You"

Single by Voice of the Beehive

from the album Honey Lingers
- B-side: "Something About God"
- Released: September 16, 1991
- Length: 3:14
- Label: London
- Songwriter: Tony Romeo
- Producer: Don Was

Voice of the Beehive singles chronology
"Monsters and Angels" (1991)	"I Think I Love You" (1991)	"Perfect Place" (1991)

In 1991, Anglo-American alternative rock band Voice of the Beehive recorded "I Think I Love You" for their second studio album, Honey Lingers (1991). Issued through London Records, it was released as the second single from the album on September 16, 1991, and was produced by Don Was. Their version of the song peaked at number 25 on the UK Singles Chart in October 1991. The single also reached number 12 on the Australian Singles Chart in March 1992.

=== Track listings ===
- 7-inch and cassette single; Australasian CD single
1. "I Think I Love You"
2. "Something About God"
- 12-inch single

A1. "I Think I Love You" (Orgy mix)
A2. "Say It"
A3. "Don't Call Me Baby"
B1. "VB – Goddess of Love"

- CD single
1. "I Think I Love You" (7-inch)
2. "I Think I Love You" (Don Was' Guilty Pleasure mix)
3. "VB – Goddess of Love" (vocal mix)
4. "Something About God"

=== Charts ===
Chart (1991–1992)	Peak position
Australia (ARIA)	12
Europe (Eurochart Hot 100)	72
Europe (European Hit Radio)	40
UK Singles (Official Charts)	25
UK Airplay (Music Week)	6

=== Release history ===
Region	Date	Format(s)	Label(s)	Ref.
United Kingdom	September 16, 1991	7-inch vinyl; 12-inch vinyl; CD; cassette	London	
Australia	February 17, 1992	CD; cassette	London; Polydor	
