= I'll Meet You Halfway =

Single by The Partridge Family

from the album Up to Date
- B-side: "Morning Rider on the Road"
- Released: May 1971
- Genre: Pop
- Length: 3:47 (album); 3:26 (single)
- Label: Bell Records
- Songwriters: Wes Farrell, Gerry Goffin
- Producer: Wes Farrell

The Partridge Family singles chronology
"Doesn't Somebody Want to Be Wanted" (1971)	"I'll Meet You Halfway" (1971)	"I Woke Up In Love This Morning" (1972)

"I'll Meet You Halfway" is a song written by Wes Farrell and Gerry Goffin and recorded by The Partridge Family for their 1971 album, Up to Date. It went to No.4 on the Adult Contemporary chart and reached No.9 on The Billboard Hot 100 in 1971. On the New Zealand Listener Chart it reached No. 13

== Background ==
Cash Box considered the song to be the Partridge Family's "strongest to date. The strings and horns on the song were arranged by Mike Melvoin.

== Cover versions ==
- Redd Kross on 1993 EP, "Lady in the Front Row"/
- David Cassidy on 2002 album, Then and Now
- Roger Williams on his 1971 album, Summer of '42
