= Tony Romeo =

American songwriter

- Born: December 25, 1938; Troy, New York, U.S.
- Died: June 23, 1995 (aged 56) Pleasant Valley, New York, U.S.
- Genre: Pop
- Occupations: Songwriter, singer, producer
- Instrument: Piano
- Label: Columbia Records

Tony Romeo (December 25, 1938 – June 23, 1995) was an American songwriter. He is best known for writing the number 1 hit "I Think I Love You" by The Partridge Family as well as many other hit records, mostly during the 1960s and 1970s.

== Career ==
Romeo is a creator of many hits, such as "Oh Boy (The Mood I'm In)" by both Diana Trask and Brotherhood of Man; "Walking in the Sand", sung by Al Martino, which reached number 9 on the Adult Contemporary charts in 1970; "Indian Lake" for The Cowsills; and "I'm Gonna Make You Mine" by Lou Christie. He wrote songs for The Seekers, The Everly Brothers, Richard Harris and David Cassidy among others. His songs were used in such movies as Rain Man (1988) and Gaby: A True Story (1987). and the TV program The Debbie Reynolds Show (1969–1970). Through colleague Wes Farrell's Pocket Full of Tunes songwriting agency, Romeo additionally created commercial jingles to advertise such products as Breck shampoo, Coty cosmetics' fragrance Muguet de Bois, Pall Mall cigarettes, and Scripto lighters.

Off and on, during the 1960s and 1970s, he attempted to make a name for himself as a singer and recorded solo singles "My Ol' Gin Buddy and Me"/"Mr. Hunkachunk" for Columbia Records in 1966 and "Go Johnny Go"/ "Doctor Recommended Me a Potion" in 1977 for Lifesong Records. Overall, over 150 of his songs were recorded, in addition to working as a record producer. In 1970, he wrote music and lyrics for a musical-theater version of A Dog of Flanders. He also produced the duo, Good & Plenty (cf. Good & Plenty candy). He also wrote and produced the MGM album The Trout on which he performed along with his brother Frank Romeo and Cass Morgan, and the unreleased solo album Moonwagon.

Romeo wrote nine platinum records. His most successful song, "I Think I Love You", was released in November 1970 by Bell Records, the first single released by The Partridge Family. The song hit number one on the U.S. Billboard Pop Singles chart for three weeks: November 15 – December 5, 1970

== Death ==
During the last 15 years of his life, Romeo was a resident of Pleasant Valley. He died at home at the age of 56 on June 23, 1995. His death was attributed to a heart attack. Romeo was survived by his mother, Irene Romeo Perrelle of Watervliet, and his brother Frank Romeo of Watervliet.

In 2024, producer Al Gomes was asked by Romeo's family to complete a demo that Romeo was working on at the time of his death. The finished recording, "Christmas Star," was released on June 24, 2025.

== Compositions ==
Title	Year	Original artist	Album
"Ain't Life Grand"	1967	Good & Plenty	The World of Good & Plenty
"Anthem"	1972	Wayne Newton	Can't You Hear the Song?
"Arizona Two Thoughts"	1968	The Trout	The Trout
"As Long as There's You"	1973	The Partridge Family	Crossword Puzzle
"Beautiful People"	1967	Good & Plenty	The World of Good & Plenty
"The Beginning"	1968	The Trout	The Trout
"Being Together"	1972	David Cassidy	Cherish
"The Best Way to See America"	1971	Lou Christie	Paint America Love
"Blessed Is the Rain"	1969	Brooklyn Bridge	Brooklyn Bridge
"Blue Canadian Rocky Dream"	1972	Richard Harris	Slides
"A Brand New Man"	1977	Tony Romeo	Moonwagon [unreleased]
Breck Shampoo			[commercial]
"Californie"	1966	Tomorrow's People	[single]
"The Candy Kid"	1968	The Cowsills	The Mission on the Bowery
"Carnival Girls"	1968	The Trout	The Trout
"Children Dreamin'"	1967	Good & Plenty	The World of Good & Plenty
"Christmas Star"	2025	Tony Romeo, Eric John, Al Gomes, and Carli Jackson	[single]
"Come On Joe"	1987	Jo-El Sonnier	Come On Joe
"Count on Me"	1967	Peaches and Herb	For Your Love
"Crazy Billy"	1968	The Trout	The Trout
"Days of My Life"	1968	The Seekers	[single]
"Dear Mom"	1977	Tony Romeo	Moonwagon [unreleased]
"Didn't We Love Each Other Good"	1977	Tony Romeo	Moonwagon [unreleased]
"Doctor Recommend Me a Potion"	1977	Tony Romeo	Moonwagon [unreleased]
"A Dog Named Flanders"	1970		[musical theater]
"Don Junior"	1974	Jim Ed Brown	[single]
"Don't You Ever Give Up On Me, Baby"			[songbook: Songs by Tony Romeo]
"The End"	1968	The Trout	The Trout
"Everybody's Got a Home but Me"	1966	6/7/8	[single]
"Fresh Water"	1968	The Trout	The Trout
"Get Away Said the Man in the Moon"	1977	Tony Romeo	Moonwagon [unreleased]
"Gin Buddy"	1972	Richard Harris	Slides
"Go Johnny Go"	1977	Tony Romeo	Moonwagon [unreleased]
"The Good Dr. Jefferson"	1967	Good & Plenty	The World of Good & Plenty
"Good Mornin'"	1974	Lou Christie	Lou Christie
"The Guy Who Did Me In"	1967	Good & Plenty	The World of Good & Plenty
"Happy"	1970	Paul Anka	Life Goes On
"Hello and Goodbye"	1969	Steve Dworkin, Jerry Vale	none
"Hello Hello"	1972	The Partridge Family	Shopping Bag
"Hold Onto Me"	1969	Steve Feldman	[Tony Romeo demo]
"Home for a Little While"	1973	Bubba Davis	[single]
"Ho Hum"	1967	Good & Plenty	The World of Good & Plenty
"How I Spent My Summer"	1972	Richard Harris	Slides
"Hushabye Wee Bobby"	1968	The Trout	The Trout
"I am a Clown"	1973	David Cassidy	Cherish
"I'm Coming Home"	1972	Richard Harris	Slides
"I Can Hear My Heart Begin to Cry"	1987	Girls Next Door	What a Girl Next Door Could Do
"I'd Like to Be with You"	1960		[published]
"I Don't Have to Tell You"	1972	Richard Harris	Slides
"If You Ever Go"	1972	The Partridge Family	Shopping Bag
"I'll Never Get Over You"	1973	The Partridge Family	Bulletin Board
"The Image of You"			[songbook: Songs by Tony Romeo]
"I'm Gonna Make You Mine"	1968	Camel Drivers	[single]
"Indian Lake"	1968	The Cowsills	Captain Sad and His Ship of Fools
"I Played My Part Well"	1967	Good & Plenty	The World of Good & Plenty
"Isn't It Hard to Tell the Truth"	1973	Cassandra Morgan	Isn't it Hard to Tell the Truth [unreleased]
"I Think I Love You"	1970	The Partridge Family	The Partridge Family Album
"It Means I'm in Love with You"	1973	The Partridge Family	Crossword Puzzle
"It's One of Those Nights (Yes Love)"	1971	The Partridge Family	Shopping Bag
"I Will Watch Over You"	1967	Peaches and Herb	Let's Fall in Love
"I Would Have Loved You Anyway"	1971	The Partridge Family	Sound Magazine
"I Wouldn't Be Lonely Anymore"	1967	The Bubble Gum Machine	The Bubble Gum Machine
"Last Night"	1972	The Partridge Family	Shopping Bag
"Livin' in a World Of Make Believe"	1967	Good & Plenty	The World of Good & Plenty
"The Love of a Woman"	1967	The Bubble Gum Machine	The Bubble Gum Machine
"Mayola"	1968	Back Street Union	[single]
"Milk Train"	1968	The Everly Brothers	[single]
"Montage"	1977	Tony Romeo	Moonwagon [unreleased]
"Morning Rider on the Road"	1971	The Partridge Family	Up to Date
"Mr. Hunkachunk"	1966	Tony Romeo	[single]
Muguet de Bois	1969	Brooklyn Bridge	[Coty Cosmetics' fragrance commercial]
"My Christmas Card to You"	1971	The Partridge Family	A Partridge Family Christmas Card
"My My My"	1977	Tony Romeo	Moonwagon [unreleased]
"My Ol' Gin Buddy and Me"	1966	Tony Romeo	[single]
"November Song"	1968	The Trout	The Trout
"Oh Boy (The Mood I'm In)"	1975	Diana Trask	The Mood I'm In
"Once Upon a Dusty Road"	1972	Richard Harris	Slides
"The One and Only Original Sunshine Kid"	1975	Jimmy Hannan	[single]
"One More Mile and Darlin' I'll Be Home"	1970	Kes Wyndham	[single]
"Papa je t'amine"	1971	The Cowsills	Captain Sad and His Ship of Fools
"The Path of Love"	1968	The Cowsills	Captain Sad and His Ship of Fools
Paul Mall cigarettes: "Longer Yet Milder"	1970		[commercial]
"The People Theme"	1978	Sacco [Lou Christie]	[single]
"Please Uncle John"	1977	Tony Romeo	Moonwagon [unreleased]
"(Point Me in the Direction of) Albuquerque"	1970	The Partridge Family	The Partridge Family Album
"Poor Baby"	1968	The Cowsills	The Best of The Cowsills
"Real Good Woman"	1971	The Changing Scene	The Changing Scene
"Roseanne"/"Dear Bill"	1977	Tony Romeo	Moonwagon [unreleased]
"Roy"	1972	Richard Harris	Slides
"Saddle the Wind"	1974	Lou Christie	Lou Christie
Scripto Lighters			[commercial]
"She Is the We of Me"	1967	Good & Plenty	The World of Good & Plenty
"Sing Me"	1973	David Cassidy	Dreams Are Nuthin' More Than Wishes
"Ski-Daddle"	1966	6/7/8	[single]
"Slides"	1972	Richard Harris	Slides
"Stay with Me"	1960	Four Voices	[single]
"Stingray's Back in Town"	1966	Tomorrow's People	[single]
"Stop By to Say Hi"/ "Rosanne is that You"	1977	Tony Romeo	Moonwagon [unreleased]
"Summer Days"	1971	The Partridge Family	Sound Magazine
"Sunbeam"	1974	Lou Christie	Lou Christie
"Sunny and Me"	1968	Good & Plenty	[single]
"Sunny Jo"	1972	Richard Harris	Slides
"Sunrise Highway"	1968	The Trout	The Trout
"Teddy Bear's Picnic"	1968	The Trout	The Trout
"That'll Be the Day"	1971	The Partridge Family	Up to Date
"Theme from People Magazine"	1978	Lou Christie	[CBS TV Series]
"There He Goes"	1967	Good & Plenty	The World of Good & Plenty
"There'll Never Be (A We Like You and Me)"	1975	Lou Christie	Lou Christie
"Together We're Better"	1972	The Partridge Family	The Partridge Family Notebook
"Two Little Clouds Passing By"	1975	Lou Christie	Lou Christie
"Understanding Who I Am"	1968	The Trout	The Trout
"Wha'cha Gonna Do For Me Now"	1967	The Bubble Gum Machine	The Bubble Gum Machine
"Waco"	1971	Lou Christie	Paint America Love
"Walking in the Sand"	1970	Al Martino	[single]
"We Can Never Be Friends"	1972	David Cassidy	Cherish
"Welcome Me Love"	1969	Brooklyn Bridge	Brooklyn Bridge
"Welcome to the Big Big Apple"	1977	Tony Romeo	Moonwagon [unreleased]
"Wishwater"	1969	Dr. Wishbone's Revival	[single]
"With a Little Love (Just a Little Love)"	1969	Debbie Reynolds	[Debbie Reynolds 1969–70 TV show opening theme]
"Worse Day I've Been To"	1968	The Trout	The Trout
"Yeah Yeah Yeah"	1968	The Trout	The Trout
"You Are Always on My Mind"	1971	The Partridge Family	Up to Date
"You Can't Hang On"	1968	The Trout	The Trout
"You Can't Keep Me"	1967	Good & Plenty	The World of Good & Plenty
"You Don't Have to Tell Me"	1971	The Partridge Family	Sound Magazine
"You're All the Woman that I Need"	1970	Al Martino	[promotional single]
"You're the Rock, You're the Rebel"	1987	Girls Next Door	What a Girl Next Door Could Do
"Your Kite, My Kite"	1968	Brooklyn Bridge	[single]
"You Were the One"	1974	Lou Christie	Lou Christie
