= Mike Appel =

American music industry manager and record producer

- Born: October 3, 1942 (age 83); Queens, New York City, United States
- Occupations: Music producer, manager, songwriter
- Known for: Early manager of Bruce Springsteen

Mike Appel (born October 27, 1942) is an American music industry manager and record producer who served as manager and producer for Bruce Springsteen early in Springsteen's career.

Appel was born in Flushing in Queens, New York City, of three-quarters Irish and one-quarter Jewish heritage and was raised Roman Catholic. His father was a successful real estate broker on Long Island. Appel began playing the guitar at age 14.

Appel was a guitarist and songwriter for several obscure groups during the 1950s and 1960s. He was a member of The Balloon Farm, and co-wrote their 1967 hit "A Question of Temperature". He also was a producer and songwriter for the early metal band Sir Lord Baltimore.

In 1971, Carl 'Tinker' West, the manager of some of Springsteen's early bands – Child, Steel Mill and The Bruce Springsteen Band – referred Springsteen to Appel. Springsteen auditioned for Appel in 1971; Appel told him to come back when he had written more songs. When Springsteen returned in 1972, Appel signed Springsteen to a production contract, and got Springsteen the audition with Columbia Records' John H. Hammond that led to Clive Davis signing Springsteen. He produced Springsteen's first two albums, Greetings from Asbury Park, N.J. and The Wild, the Innocent & the E Street Shuffle, both released in 1973. He also co-produced Springsteen's third and breakthrough album, Born to Run (1975).

Appel gradually alienated Springsteen during the recording of Born to Run and Springsteen sought to replace Appel as both manager and record producer with Jon Landau. By 1976 a lengthy legal battle between Appel and Springsteen ensued, which was eventually settled out of court. Appel, who was not able to find further success in the industry, subsequently co-wrote, with Marc Eliot, the 1992 book Down Thunder Road about his experiences with Springsteen.

Appel is generally credited for his aggressive tactics in getting Springsteen's career started, although his production abilities have often been criticized. However, Appel is also sometimes credited with fostering the looser, more musically adventurous and lyrically romantic approach of Springsteen's first two albums. After Landau took over, Springsteen's work became more tightly focused in musical terms and more political in content.

With producer and songwriter Wes Farrell and Jim Cretecos, Appel co-wrote five songs recorded by the Partridge Family: the chart hit "Doesn't Somebody Want to Be Wanted" (US no. 6, 1971; CAN no. 1) and the album tracks "I Can Feel Your Heartbeat" and "Somebody Wants To Love You" (both 1970) and "Umbrella Man" and "Rainmaker" (both 1971).

== Bibliography ==
- Eliot, Marc with Appel, Mike. Down Thunder Road. Simon & Schuster, 1992, ISBN 0-671-86898-5.
- Heylin, Clinton, E Street Shuffle: The Glory Days of Bruce Springsteen & The E Street Band, Viking, 2012, ISBN 978-0670-02662-3.
