= Robin Ward (singer) =

American singer

- Also known as: Jackie Ward
- Born: Jacqueline McDonnell; 1941 (age 84–85); Hawaii, US
- Genres: Pop, TV theme songs, Movie songs, Advertising
- Occupation: Singer
- Instrument: Voice
- Years active: 1954–1979
- Label: Dot Records
- Formerly of: Partridge Family, Ray Conniff Singers, Ron Hicklin Singers, Anita Kerr Singers

Jackie Ward (born Jacqueline McDonnell, 1941), better known as Robin Ward, is an American singer. She was a "one-hit wonder" with the 1963 million-selling song "Wonderful Summer". Ward's voice was recorded for U.S. television series, motion pictures, advertisements, and pop records. She was one of the actual singers on the recordings attributed to The Partridge Family.

== Biography ==
=== Early years ===
Ward was born Jacqueline McDonnell in 1941 to a military family in Hawaii (her father served in the US Navy) and raised in Nebraska. Her first public singing performances were with her two sisters in a Nebraska church when she was eight years old. After the trio won a national talent search run by Horace Heidt, they moved to Los Angeles to seek work in the music industry.

At the age of 13, Ward was hired by Los Angeles television station KTLA to sing on a Your Hit Parade-like program, Bandstand Revue; Ward performed popular hits for four years. Then she started a career of singing on demo and released recordings. One 1962 session was singing the "la la la" parts in Pat Boone's "Speedy Gonzales", which became a million-selling single. (Elton John said the "hook" in his best-selling single "Crocodile Rock" was inspired by Ward's "Speedy Gonzales" vocal.)

=== "Wonderful Summer" ===
In 1963, songwriter-producer Perry Botkin Jr. hired Jackie Ward to make a demo recording of "Wonderful Summer", a song he wrote with co-writer and co-producer Gil Garfield. After recording Ward's vocal at Gold Star Studios in Los Angeles, Botkin thought it might sound better if her voice was higher-pitched, so he sped up the recording by wrapping splicing tape around the capstan of the machine. Botkin realized the finished recording, with bird and surf sound effects added, was good enough to release as a pop music single. But because the sped-up singing sounded younger than 21-year-old Jackie Ward, she suggested using her daughter's first name Robin on the record label. That fall, "Wonderful Summer" was released by Dot Records as a 45 rpm single. Sales exceeded one million copies in the United States, propelling the record to No. 14 on the Billboard Hot 100 chart of December 14–21, 1963, and No. 1 on the WLS Silver Dollar Survey for all four weeks in December 1963. On the Hot R&B Singles chart, "Wonderful Summer" went to No. 23. In Canada the song reached number 31.

An album followed, with limited success. Jackie Ward made additional "Robin Ward" recordings, including a duet with radio DJ Wink Martindale, another Dot Records artist. In 1964 Ward released the single "Winter's Here", which reached No. 123 on the Billboard chart.

=== Post-"Robin Ward" TV, movies, and records singing ===
In the early to mid-1960s Jackie was one of the singers on The Red Skelton Show and The Danny Kaye Show, and later, on The Carol Burnett Show. In the 1970s she sang on The Sonny & Cher Comedy Hour.

Ward sang in commercials, including for Rice-A-Roni ("The San Francisco treat").

Ward's voice is heard on the television theme songs Flipper, Batman, Love, American Style, Maude (with Donny Hathaway providing the lead vocal), and The Partridge Family.

By her own estimate, Ward's voice can be heard in "maybe 800" films. Among them are her voice dubbed as Natalie Wood singing Academy Award-nominated song "The Sweetheart Tree" from movie The Great Race, as Wood in Inside Daisy Clover, and as Janet Leigh in An American Dream. Ward is the singing voice of Cindy Bear in Hey There, It's Yogi Bear!, and the Singer in Charlotte's Web. In 1965 movie Beach Blanket Bingo, Ward sings "New Love" and "Fly Boy", lip-synched by actor Linda Evans.

Along with her TV, movie and advertising singing, Ward sang backing vocals for Barbra Streisand, on "Stoney End", Nat King Cole, Bing Crosby, Frank Sinatra, Gordon Lightfoot, the Carpenters, Cass Elliot, and Joan Baez. Ward did broadcast recordings of musicals Hair, Grease, Annie, and Hello Dolly. Ward sang a duet with Allan Sherman on his song Here's To the Crabgrass from his 1963 comedy album My Son The Nut. In 1967, she sang on Gábor Szabó's album for Impulse!, Wind, Sky And Diamonds, as a member of The California Dreamers.

Ward also sang alto in the vocal groups the Anita Kerr Singers and the Ron Hicklin Singers (who anonymously made many hit records beyond the Partridge Family). As a member of the Ray Conniff Singers, Ward recorded several lead and solo vocals.

=== The Partridge Family ===
Ward contributed to The Partridge Family TV show and records. Other than show stars David Cassidy and Shirley Jones, none of the actors participated in singing or playing the songs; on camera they lip-synced and pretended to play instruments. Ward was in the Ron Hicklin Singers vocal group. She joined brothers John Bahler and Tom Bahler, and Ron Hicklin, who at the time were all individually credited on album jackets as background vocalists, such as 1972's The Partridge Family Notebook (Bell Records 1111) and 1971's A Partridge Family Christmas Card (Bell Records 6066). This group performed all of the TV show performances and records credited to the Partridge Family (along with session instrumental musicians in the Wrecking Crew).
