= Doesn't Somebody Want to Be Wanted =

Single by The Partridge Family

from the album Up to Date
- B-side: "You Are Always on My Mind"
- Released: February 1971
- Recorded: 1970
- Genre: Bubblegum pop
- Length: 2:49
- Label: Bell Records
- Songwriters: Mike Appel, Jim Cretecos, Wes Farrell
- Producer: Wes Farrell

The Partridge Family singles chronology
"I Think I Love You" (1970)	"Doesn't Somebody Want to Be Wanted" (1971)	"I'll Meet You Halfway" (1971)

"Doesn't Somebody Want to Be Wanted" is a song written by Mike Appel, Jim Cretecos, and Wes Farrell and was recorded by The Partridge Family for their 1971 album, Up to Date.

== Background ==
Lead singer David Cassidy hated the song and didn't think it was very good. In addition, he hated the idea of speaking aloud in the middle of the song. He hated it so much, he refused to do it.

His refusal caused consternation with the studio and the record company, where the heads of both Bell Records and Screen Gems, both owned by Columbia Pictures, got involved. Shooting of The Partridge Family was stopped so his manager and agent could talk to him over the issue. It was suggested to Cassidy that the song would achieve greater commercial success with the spoken interlude included.

Cassidy finally caved in to the collective pressure and recorded the song as requested. When it was finished, he begged them not to release it: "It was horrible, I was embarrassed by it. I still can't listen to that record."

== Reception ==
Cash Box described the song as being "an even more intriguing bit of material" than "I Think I Love You".

== Chart performance ==
The song went to #6 on The Billboard Hot 100 in 1971 and was on the charts for 12 weeks.

The song went to #1 in Canada. The song also reached #6 in France and #9 in Australia. It was named the #13 song of 1971 on the Cashbox charts. The song was certified as a gold disc in March 1971.

== Charts ==
=== Weekly charts ===
Chart (1971)	Peak position
Australia KMR	7
Canada RPM Top Singles	1
Canada RPM Adult Contemporary	13
France	6
New Zealand (Listener)	20
US Billboard Hot 100	6
US Billboard Adult Contemporary	6
US Cash Box Top 100	1

=== Year-end charts ===
Chart (1971)	Rank
Australia	70
Canada	23
US Billboard Hot 100	53
US Adult Contemporary (Billboard)	49
US Cash Box Top 100	13

== Popular culture ==
- This was also the song that was playing before the Emergency Broadcast System False Alarm of 1971 on WOWO Radio.
- It is mentioned in Reservoir Dogs, as part of the fictional "K-BILLY's Super Sounds of the '70s" radio program.
- The song is featured in the episode "Never Again" of The X-Files.
