= The Partridge Family =

American musical sitcom (1970–1974)

- Genre: Musical sitcom
- Created by: Bernard Slade
- Starring: Shirley Jones; David Cassidy; Susan Dey; Danny Bonaduce; Suzanne Crough; Jeremy Gelbwaks; Dave Madden; Brian Forster; Rick Segall
- Theme music composer: Diane Hildebrand; Danny Janssen; Wes Farrell
- Opening theme: "When We're Singin'" (1970–1971); "C'mon, Get Happy" (1971–1974)
- Composers: George Duning; Benny Golson; Warren Barker; Hugo Montenegro; Shorty Rogers
- Country of origin: United States
- Original language: English
- No. of seasons: 4
- No. of episodes: 96 (list of episodes)

Production
- Executive producer: Bob Claver
- Producers: William Bickley; Paul Junger Witt; Dale McRaven; Larry Rosen; Mel Swope
- Cinematography: Fred Jackman, Jr.; Irving Lippman
- Camera setup: Single-camera
- Running time: 25 minutes
- Production company: Screen Gems

Original release
- Network: ABC
- Release: September 25, 1970 – March 23, 1974

Related
- Getting Together; Goober and the Ghost Chasers; Partridge Family 2200 A.D.

The Partridge Family is an American musical sitcom, created by Bernard Slade, that aired in the United States from September 1970 to March 1974 on ABC. Following its final first-run telecast on ABC in March 1974, the show went into reruns from March 30 to August 31, 1974.

The series follows the lives of a fictional pop music band formed by the titular family, including Shirley (Shirley Jones), Keith (David Cassidy), Laurie (Susan Dey), and Danny (Danny Bonaduce), as well as their manager Reuben Kincaid (Dave Madden). The family was loosely based on the real-life musical family the Cowsills, a popular band in the late 1960s and early 1970s.

The show was broadcast on ABC as part of its Friday night line-up, and had subsequent runs in syndication.

== Premise ==
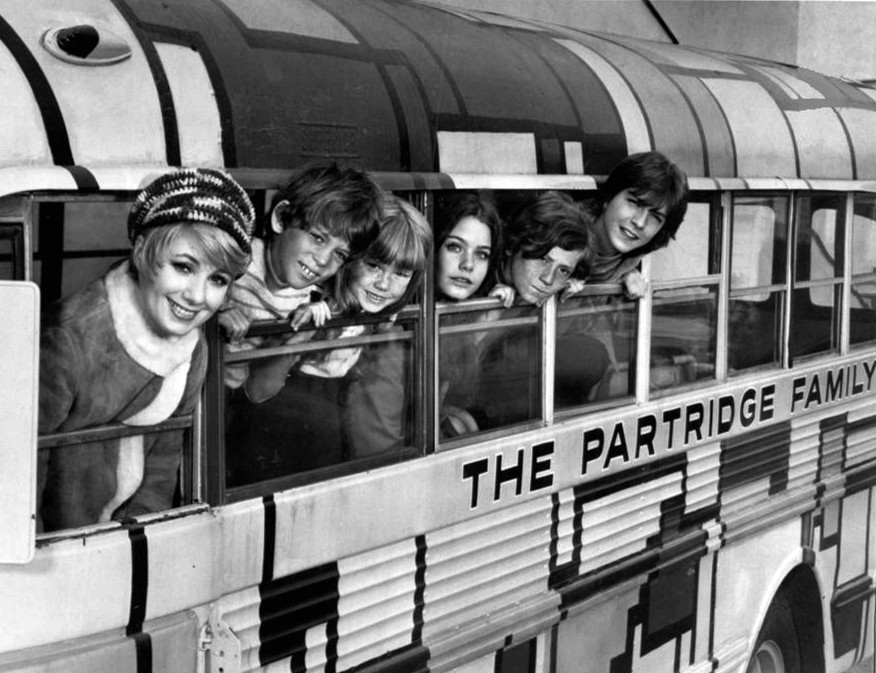
The Partridge Family, season 1. L-R: Shirley Jones, Jeremy Gelbwaks, Suzanne Crough, Susan Dey, Danny Bonaduce and David Cassidy

In the pilot episode, a group of musical siblings in the fictional city of San Pueblo, California (said to be "40 miles from Napa County" in episode 24, "A Partridge By Any Other Name"), convinces their widowed mother, bank teller Shirley Partridge, to help them out by singing as they record a pop song in their garage. Through the efforts of the precocious and street-smart 10-year-old Danny, they find a manager, Reuben Kincaid, who helps make the song a Top 40 hit. After more persuading, Shirley agrees that the family can go on tour. They acquire an old school bus, a 1957 Chevrolet Series 6800 Superior, for touring, paint it with Mondrian-inspired patterns, and head to Las Vegas, Nevada, for their first live gig at Caesars Palace.

Subsequent episodes usually show the band performing in various venues or in their garage. The shows often contrast suburban life with the adventures of a show-business family on the road. After the first season, more of the show's action takes place in the family's hometown than on tour.

== Background ==
The Partridge Family was created for television by Bernard Slade, and the series' executive producer was Bob Claver. The show was inspired by and loosely based on the Cowsills, a family pop music group that was famous in the late 1960s. In the show's early development, the Cowsill children were considered by the producers, but because the Cowsills were not trained actors and were too old for the roles as scripted, Slade and Claver abandoned that idea. Shirley Jones had already been signed as mother Shirley Partridge and star of the show, with the producers insisting that Jones' casting in the role of Mrs. Partridge was not negotiable.

The pilot was filmed in December 1969. This unbroadcast pilot differs from the pilot that was broadcast in 1970. In the unaired pilot, Shirley's name is Connie and she has a boyfriend played by Jones' real-life husband at the time, Jack Cassidy, father of David Cassidy. The family has a different address and lives in Ohio.

The show proved popular, though the fame reportedly took its toll on several, if not most, of the starring cast, particularly David Cassidy. In the midst of his rise to fame, Cassidy soon felt stifled by the show and trapped by the mass hysteria surrounding his every move. In May 1972, he appeared nude on the cover of Rolling Stone magazine in a cropped Annie Leibovitz photo. He used the article to get away from his squeaky clean image. The article mentioned that Cassidy was riding around New York in the back of a car "stoned and drunk".

Shortly after the series ended, the scriptwriter Roberta Tatum launched a lawsuit against Screen Gems concerning the creation of the show. She claimed that she had submitted a similar premise to Screen Gems before 1970 called Baker's Half-Dozen. The matter was resolved out of court, with Tatum receiving a reported $150,000 from Screen Gems.

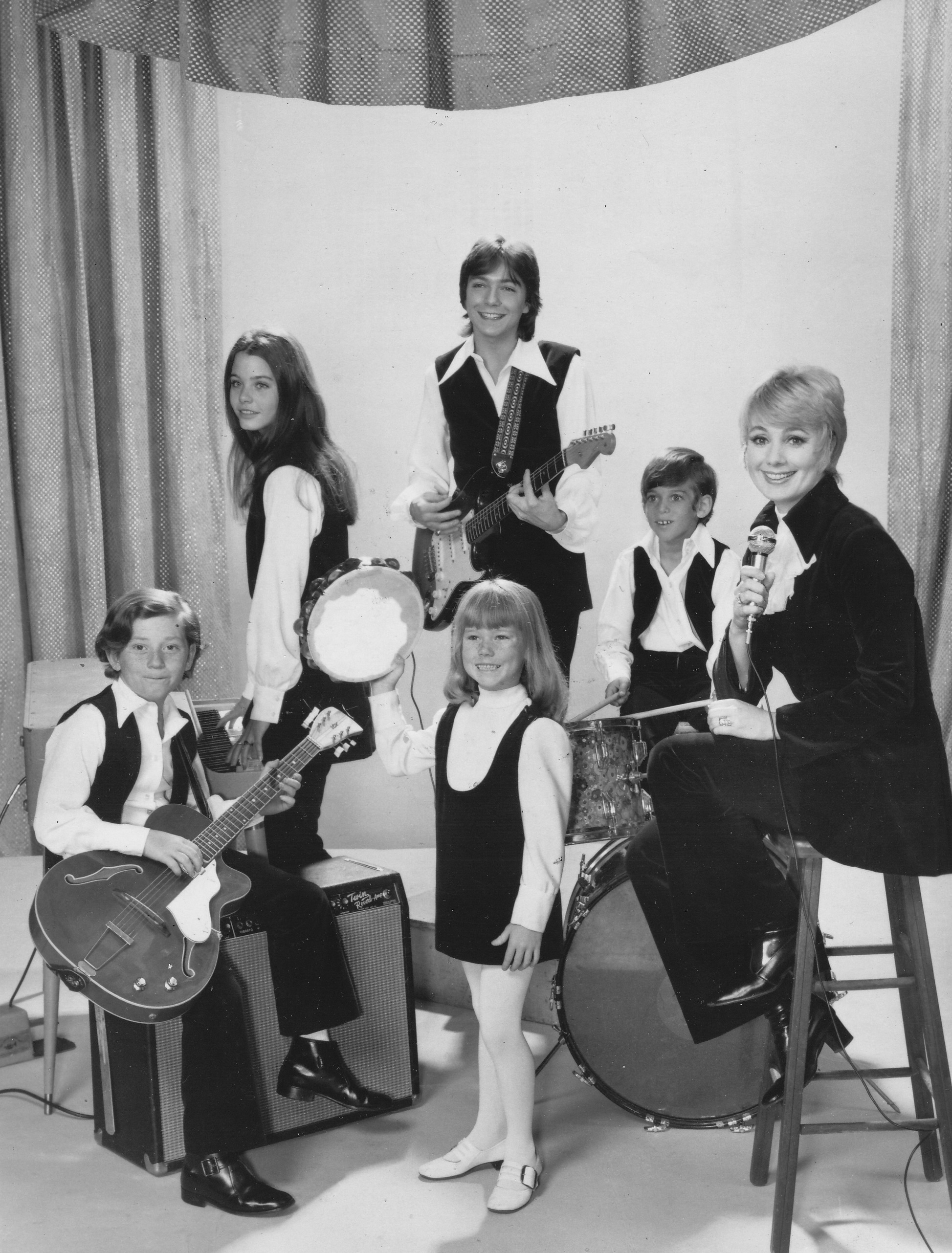
The Partridge Family, season 1

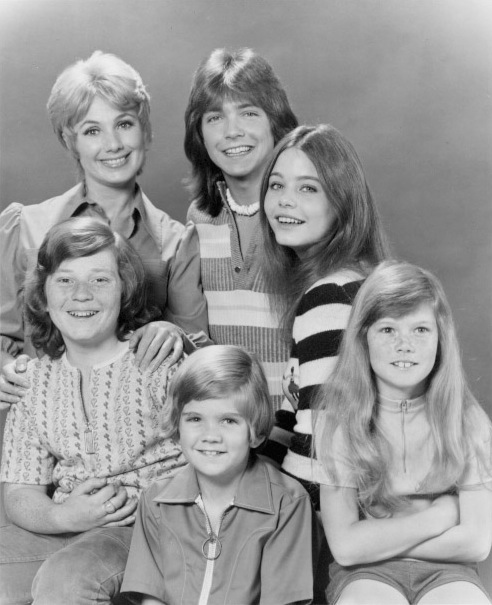
The Partridge Family, season 3

== Cast and characters ==
- Shirley Jones as Shirley Partridge: vocals, keyboard, tambourine, percussion
- David Cassidy as Keith Partridge: lead vocals, guitars, banjo
- Susan Dey as Laurie Partridge: vocals, harmony, piano, Hammond organ, percussion
- Danny Bonaduce as Danny Partridge: vocals, bass guitar
- Jeremy Gelbwaks as Chris Partridge (season 1): vocals, drums
- Brian Forster as Chris Partridge (seasons 2–4): vocals, drums
- Suzanne Crough as Tracy Partridge: tambourine, percussion, vocals
- Dave Madden as Reuben Kincaid: band manager
- Rick Segall as Ricky Stevens (season 4): singer
- Simone, the family's pet dog (Season 1, occasionally in later seasons)
- Gary Dubin as Punky Lazaar (recurring role): a friend of Danny Partridge

Unlike The Monkees, none of the members of the cast played any music on the show or the album releases and originally only Shirley Jones sang. Initially, all of the actors pretended to sing while listening to recordings by session musicians, who provided the real vocal and instrumental music attributed to the Partridge Family. However, after Cassidy demonstrated to the series music producer, Wes Farrell, that he could sing, he was allowed to record his own vocal parts.

=== Notable guest stars ===
During the show's four-season run, many actors made guest appearances. The country singer Johnny Cash made an uncredited cameo appearance in the pilot episode. Ray Bolger played Shirley's father in three episodes and Rosemary DeCamp played her mother in four episodes. Then-Governor Ronald Reagan's daughter, Maureen Reagan, also appeared in one episode. The future Charlie's Angels stars Jaclyn Smith, Farrah Fawcett and Cheryl Ladd all made guest appearances on separate episodes.

Baseball Hall of Fame catcher Johnny Bench appeared in a cameo role as a Kings Island Inn poolside waiter in "I Left My Heart in Cincinnati," a Season 3 episode which first aired on January 26, 1973.

Bobby Sherman appeared in the last episode of the first season as the struggling songwriter Bobby Conway. This episode led into a short-lived spin-off series on ABC, Getting Together, starring Sherman and Wes Stern as Conway's business partner Lionel Poindexter.

Other celebrity guest stars included:

- Morey Amsterdam
- John Astin
- Carl Ballantine
- John Banner
- Lane Bradbury
- Edgar Buchanan
- George Chakiris
- Dick Clark
- Jackie Coogan
- Howard Cosell
- Norman Fell
- Bernard Fox
- Ned Glass
- James Gregory
- Margaret Hamilton
- Pat Harrington Jr.
- Arte Johnson
- Harvey Lembeck
- Art Metrano
- Mary Ann Mobley
- Harry Morgan
- Slim Pickens
- Richard Pryor
- Barbara Rhoades
- Maggie Roswell
- Michael Rupert
- William Schallert
- Nita Talbot
- Larry Wilcox
- Dick Wilson
- William Windom

Some guest actors later became famous, including:

- Meredith Baxter
- Richard Bull
- Bert Convy
- Farrah Fawcett
- Jodie Foster
- Anthony Geary
- Louis Gossett Jr.
- Harold Gould
- Jackie Earle Haley
- Mark Hamill
- Season Hubley
- Ann Jillian
- Gordon Jump
- Cheryl Ladd
- Michael Lembeck
- William Lucking
- Stuart Margolin
- Richard Mulligan
- Holly Near
- Michael Ontkean
- Noam Pitlik
- Annette O'Toole
- Charlotte Rae
- Rob Reiner
- Jack Riley
- Jaclyn Smith
- Vic Tayback
- Nancy Walker
- Frank Welker

== Episodes ==
| Season | Episodes | Originally released | |
| Season | Episodes | First released | Last released |
|---|---|---|---|
| 1 | 25 | September 25, 1970 | March 19, 1971 |
| 2 | 24 | September 17, 1971 | March 17, 1972 |
| 3 | 25 | September 15, 1972 | March 23, 1973 |
| 4 | 22 | September 15, 1973 | March 23, 1974 |

== Production ==
At the end of the first season, Jeremy Gelbwaks' family moved out of the Los Angeles area, and the part of Chris was recast with the actor Brian Forster. According to Cassidy, Gelbwaks "had a personality conflict with every person in the cast and the producers" and especially did not get along with Cassidy or Bonaduce. A dog named Simone appeared in the first season, but it was phased out during the second season. At the beginning of the fourth season, a four-year-old neighbor, Ricky Stevens (Ricky Segall), appeared and sang a children's song during each episode, but the character was dropped mid-season.

=== Music ===
Music recorded for the pilot episode was produced by Shorty Rogers, a jazz musician and arranger who worked with the Monkees. Songs for the ongoing series were recorded by the music producer Wes Farrell. Chip Douglas was the first to be offered the job of producing the music, but declined.

The studio concoction that forms the Partridge Family sound has lead singer David Cassidy, members of the Ron Hicklin Singers as backing vocalists and several of the era's most highly regarded studio musicians, now known as "the Wrecking Crew". Cassidy's co-star and real-life stepmother Shirley Jones also appears on the recordings, although there remains speculation that she can be heard more prominently in the television mixes of the songs than in the album mixes. In each episode of the sitcom, the television family of six is seen on screen together in recording sessions and concert performances, playing the part of performers, but none except Cassidy and Jones was involved in any of the actual recordings. Two tracks on the 1970 first LP, The Partridge Family Album, do not include Cassidy. These songs, "I'm on the Road" and "I Really Want to Know You", were sung in blended-harmony style by members of the Ron Hicklin Singers: brothers John and Tom Bahler, Ron Hicklin and Jackie Ward (who in 1963, as Robin Ward, charted with the no. 14 hit "Wonderful Summer"). These professional singers appear throughout the Partridge Family's output.

Cassidy was originally to lip sync to dubbed vocals with the rest of the cast but convinced Farrell that he could sing, and was allowed to join the studio ensemble as the lead singer.

Season 1, episode 1 is the only episode of the series that does not use any version of the theme song, instead using the Rogers and Kelly Gordon song "Together (Havin' A Ball)" under the opening credits. The first episode is also unique in that it does not include the animated main title, instead using shots of the Partridge Family singing "Together" as if in a performance.

Two different songs were used as the opening theme for the television series. Season 1 uses "When We're Singin'" (Wes Farrell and Diane Hildebrand):

"Come on down and meet everybody,
And hear us singin'.
There's nothing better than being together,
When we're singin'.
Five of us, and Mom working all day,
We knew we could help her if our music would pay.
Danny got Reuben to sell our song,
And it really came together when Mom sang along..." (from "When We're Singin'")

The other seasons all use "C'mon Get Happy" (Wes Farrell and Danny Janssen), which retained the "When We're Singin'" tune but with new lyrics by Danny Janssen:

Hello world, hear the song that we're singing.
C'mon get happy.
A whole lot o' loving is what we'll be bringin'
We'll make you happy.
We had a dream, we'd go travelin' together,
We spread a little love and then we keep movin' on.
Somethin' always happens whenever we're together;
We get a happy feelin' when we're singing a song..." (from "C'mon Get Happy")

== Broadcast history ==
For its final season, ABC moved the show from its 8:30 p.m. Friday slot (where it rated first in its slot) to Saturday at 8 p.m. (opposite CBS' top-rated All in the Family and NBC's medical drama Emergency!, against which it lost more than half of its audience from the previous season).

In the United Kingdom, it was first picked up by the BBC who showed the first three episodes in a Friday children's slot of 17:20, starting on September 17, 1971. From October 2, 1971, it moved to Saturdays at 17:10, and eight episodes were shown at this time. A further episode was shown on New Year's Eve (December 31, 1971), after which the BBC dropped the programme. After Cassidy succeeded with UK Top 30 chart hits the following year, the show was picked up by ITV in many regions. On London Weekend Television, it was shown at Saturday lunchtimes. After the show's popularity began to decline in the US, it began to increase in the UK. This new popularity in the UK gave the Partridge Family five UK Top 20 hits, some of which were less popular in the US.

After 96 episodes and eight Partridge Family albums, ABC canceled the show in 1974.

=== Ratings ===
| Season | Time slot (ET) | Rank | Estimated audience |
|---|---|---|---|
| 1970–71 | Fridays 8:30 p.m. | #26 | 19.8 rating, 11,899,800 households |
| 1971–72 | Fridays 8:30 p.m. | #16 | 22.6 rating, 14,034,600 households |
| 1972–73 | Fridays 8:30 p.m. | #19 | 20.6 rating, 13,348,800 households |
| 1973–74 | Saturdays 8:00 p.m. | #78 | 9.8 rating, 6,487,600 households |

=== Syndication ===
Nickelodeon ran The Partridge Family from 1993 to 1994 as part of its Nick at Nite line-up. The network used interviews and commercials with cast members, and created a new version of the bus for promotion. The show was also shown at various times on USA Network, Fox Family, Ion Television, and Hallmark Channel. In January 2011, it was shown on Antenna TV. FETV started showing The Partridge Family in December 2017 until its removal in 2021. AXS TV began airing the show on October 2, 2023 until its removal in March 2025.

The cast (with a videotaped appearance by Susan Dey) was reunited in 1977 on the special Thanksgiving Reunion with The Partridge Family and My Three Sons. They reunited again in the 1990s on The Arsenio Hall Show (minus Dey) and the short-lived talk show Danny! (1995) (minus Cassidy, but with a phone-in greeting from Dey). They were also featured on E! True Hollywood Story, Biography and VH1's Behind the Music.

When the digital subchannel Antenna TV began in January 2011, The Partridge Family was one of its offerings through the network's distribution agreement with Sony Pictures Television (parent company and successor of series producer Screen Gems). From November 25–27, 2020, Antenna TV aired all 96 episodes in chronological order to commemorate the 50th anniversary of the series' debut.

As of 2023, the show streams in Canada via CTV Throwback.

== Reception ==
=== Awards and nominations ===
| Year | Association | Category | Result |
|---|---|---|---|
| 1971 | Grammy Awards | Best New Artist | Nominated |
| 1971 | Golden Globe Awards | Best TV Show – Musical/Comedy | Nominated |
| 1972 | Golden Globe Awards | Best TV Show – Musical/Comedy | Nominated |
| 2003 | TV Land Awards | Quintessential Non-Traditional Family | Nominated |
| 2003 | TV Land Awards | Hippest Fashion Plate – Male to David Cassidy | Won |
| 2004 | TV Land Awards | Favorite Teen Dream – Female to Susan Dey | Won |
| 2004 | TV Land Awards | Irreplaceable Replacement for Brian Forster replacing Jeremy Gelbwaks | Nominated |
| 2006 | TV Land Awards | Favorite Singing Siblings | Nominated |
| 2006 | TV Land Awards | The Most Irreplaceable Replacement for Brian Forster replacing Jeremy Gelbwaks | Nominated |
| 2007 | TV Land Awards | Most Beautiful Braces – Susan Dey | Nominated |

== Media ==
=== Film adaptation ===
In April 1995 following the successful release of The Brady Bunch Movie, it was announced Warner Bros. had made a deal with Bernard Slade and Witt/Thomas Productions to develop a feature length adaptation.

=== Discography ===
The Partridge Family was produced for ABC by Screen Gems. The company promoted the show by releasing a series of albums featuring the family band, though David Cassidy and Shirley Jones (as backing vocalist) were the only cast members who were actually featured on the recordings.

As the show and other associated merchandising soared, Cassidy became a teen idol. The producers signed Cassidy as a solo act as well. Cassidy began touring with his own group of musicians, performing Partridge songs, as well as hits from his own albums, to thousands of screaming teenagers in major stadiums across the US, the UK, Europe, Japan and Australia.

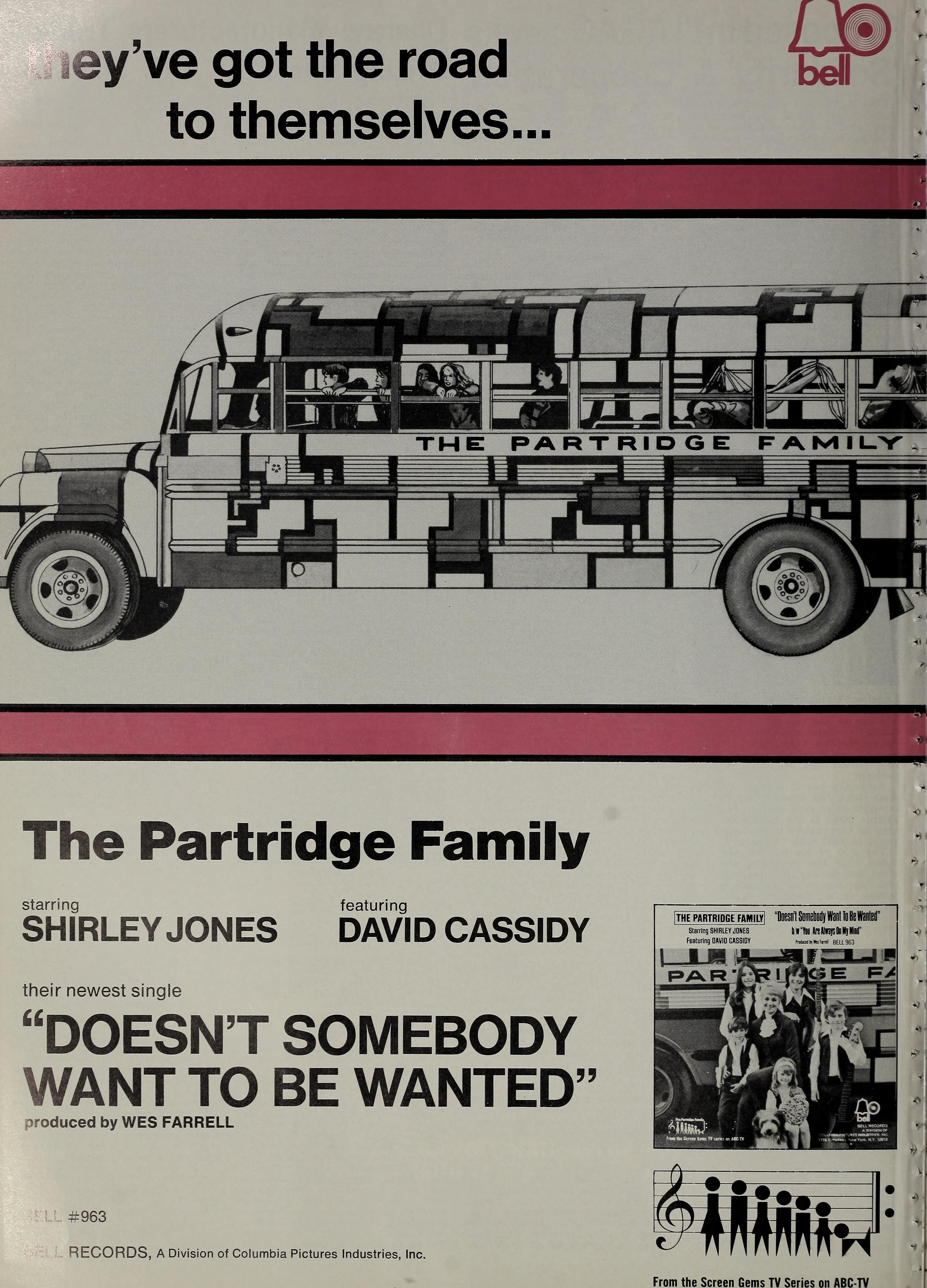
Cashbox advertisement, February 27, 1971

The Partridge Family remain best known for their 1970 smash debut single "I Think I Love You", written by Tony Romeo, who had penned the big 1968 hit "Indian Lake" (and other records) by the Cowsills. "I Think I Love You" spent three weeks at number one on the Billboard Hot 100 in November and December 1970. It sold more than five million copies, outselling the Beatles' "Let It Be", was awarded a gold disc, and made the group the third fictional artist to have a number one hit (after the Chipmunks and the Archies). The single's parent LP, The Partridge Family Album, reached No. 4 on the Billboard 200. It was also awarded gold status by the RIAA in December 1970, having sold more than 500,000 copies. A string of US and/or UK hit singles followed: "Doesn't Somebody Want to Be Wanted", "I'll Meet You Halfway", "I Woke Up in Love This Morning", "It's One of Those Nights (Yes Love)", "Am I Losing You", and covers of the early- to -mid-1960s hits "Looking Through the Eyes of Love", "Breaking Up Is Hard to Do" and "Walking in the Rain". These singles were showcased on the three gold-certified albums Up to Date (1971), Sound Magazine (1971) and Shopping Bag (1972), plus The Partridge Family Notebook (1972), Crossword Puzzle (1973), and Bulletin Board (1973), with "Breaking Up Is Hard to To Do" making its album debut on The Partridge Family at Home with Their Greatest Hits (1972). The holiday album A Partridge Family Christmas Card was the top-selling Christmas record of 1971. Record sales success was replicated internationally, with both the Partridge Family group and Cassidy as a solo singer achieving huge hits in Canada, Great Britain, Europe, Japan, Australia, New Zealand and South Africa. In all, the Partridge Family released 89 songs on nine albums between 1970 and 1973.

=== Danny Bonaduce album ===
Though Danny Bonaduce was not part of the session band, he also got a recording contract. His self-titled debut LP was released in 1973 by Lion Records, a subsidiary label of MGM Records. The single from the album, "Dreamland", was a minor hit. Though Bonaduce was credited as lead singer on all songs, he insists that he had a weak voice and that Bruce Roberts provided most of the vocals on the album. The first track, "I'll Be Your Magician", in which the 13-year-old Bonaduce seduces a woman into having sexual intercourse with him, has developed a cult following for its campy entertainment value. The original, watered-down version was recorded with Cassidy for the Sound Magazine album, but was discarded and never released. In fall 2010, Cassidy dared Bonaduce to learn how to play the bass guitar lines for the songs the Partridge Family performed. Bonaduce learned the bass guitar line for "Doesn't Somebody Want to Be Wanted", stating that although he had no ability to read music, the song was relatively easy to learn; Cassidy and Bonaduce subsequently performed together on rare occasions.

=== Ricky Segall album ===
In conjunction with the songs featured by Ricky Segall in the fourth season of the TV show, Bell Records released the album Ricky Segall and The Segalls in 1973. Seven of the album's 10 tracks were featured on the TV show. Two tracks were also released as a single, "Sooner or Later"/"Say Hey Willie" (Bell 45429).

=== Animated spin-off ===
The Partridges had a brief resurgence in animated form that saw the family propelled into the future. The animated Partridges first appeared when the kids did a series of guest spots on Goober and the Ghost Chasers. That idea evolved into a CBS Saturday morning Hanna-Barbera-produced cartoon in 1974, Partridge Family 2200 A.D. (also called The Partridge Family in Outer Space when rerun later as part of Fred Flintstone and Friends). Jones and Cassidy did not voice their animated characters and Susan Dey and Dave Madden had very limited involvement with this cartoon.

=== Board game ===
Released in 1971 by Milton Bradley, The Partridge Family Game offers a glimpse of what life on the road was like for one of TV's favorite fictional pop bands. The back of the box explains, "As on TV, many happenings occur to the Partridge family, this game describes one of them. They have finished playing at a local arena and must hurry to their BUS to get traveling again. On the way, they may have some delays." The object of the game is to be the first player to get back to the tour bus.

=== Books ===
During the entire four season run of the series, Curtis Books published seventeen paperback mystery novels featuring the entire cast of characters. The various authors included Michael Avallone, Vic Crume, Lee Hays, Paul Fairman, Vance Stanton and Edward Fenton.

=== Comic books ===
Charlton Comics produced a comic book featuring the Partridge Family between March 1971 and December 1973 and later on just David Cassidy comic books. It features stories about the characters, song lyrics and features about Cassidy. The drawings were provided by Don Sherwood.

=== Reunion special ===
Three years after the show's cancellation, Jones and other cast members gathered with cast members of My Three Sons for the ABC special Thanksgiving Reunion with The Partridge Family and My Three Sons, which aired on November 25, 1977. The show featured the casts discussing the histories of their shows, although other than Jones and Fred MacMurray both portraying single parents of large families, the two series had no narrative link.

=== Reunion on Danny! ===
In 1995, a majority of the cast appeared on Bonaduce's talk show Danny!, including Shirley Jones, Dave Madden, Jeremy Gelbwaks, Brian Forster, Suzanne Crough, Ricky Segall and the show's executive producer Bob Claver. Susan Dey was working on a movie at the time but called into the show to briefly reminisce with Bonaduce. David Cassidy was also unable to appear as he was working on a new album at that time.

=== Come On Get Happy: The Partridge Family Story ===
In 1999, a "behind-the-scenes" TV movie called Come On Get Happy: The Partridge Family Story aired on ABC. The film focuses on the lives of Danny Bonaduce (who narrated) and David Cassidy.

=== The New Partridge Family ===
In 2004, VH1 produced a pilot for a syndicated The New Partridge Family, starring Suzanne Sole as Shirley, Leland Grant as Keith, Emma Stone (in her first role) as Laurie, Spencer Tuskowski as Danny, and French Stewart as Reuben Kincaid. The pilot was the only episode produced. The episode ended with a teaser for "next week's episode" in which the children's estranged father, played by Danny Bonaduce, drops in for a surprise visit with his same-sex life partner.

=== Ruby & the Rockits ===
In 2009, Shirley Jones guest starred as David Cassidy's mother on the television series Ruby & the Rockits. David and half-brother Patrick Cassidy played brothers on the series. Shirley's other sons were a part of the show: Shaun Cassidy was producer, and Ryan Cassidy worked behind the scenes.

=== Animated reboot ===
On June 8, 2023, it was announced an animated reboot of the series is in the works. The Partridge Family will be black in this version.

=== Home media ===
In 1997, episodes were released on Columbia TriStar Home Video Screen Gems VHS during a wave of 1970s nostalgia VHS releases.

Sony Pictures Home Entertainment has released all four seasons of The Partridge Family on DVD in Region 1. Seasons 1 and 2 have been released in Regions 2 and 4.

On October 15, 2013, Sony released The Partridge Family – The Complete Series on DVD in Region 1. The 12-disc set features all 96 episodes of the series as well as bonus features.

The Screen Gems closing logo was removed from episodes for the first three seasons on DVD.

On August 27, 2013, it was announced that Mill Creek Entertainment had acquired the home video rights to various television series from the Sony Pictures library including The Partridge Family. They subsequently re-released the first two seasons on June 24, 2014.

On September 22, 2015, Mill Creek re-released Partridge Family – The Complete Series on DVD in Region 1 with the original Screen Gems logo reinstated at the end of the credits. No American DVD releases contain the epilogue to episode #25 (which does appear on Region 2 & 4 releases), the unaired 1969 pilot or any episodes of the spin-off series Getting Together.

| DVD name | Ep. # | Release date |
|---|---|---|
| The Complete 1st Season | 25 | May 3, 2005; June 24, 2014 (re-release) |
| The Complete 2nd Season | 24 | November 8, 2005; June 24, 2014 (re-release) |
| The Complete 3rd Season | 25 | October 14, 2008 |
| The Complete 4th Season | 22 | February 3, 2009 |
| The Complete Series | 96 | October 15, 2013; September 22, 2015 (re-release) |

== See also ==
- Partridge Family 2200 A.D.
