= Mike Melvoin =

American jazz pianist and composer (1937–2012)

- Born: Michael Melvoin; May 10, 1937; Oshkosh, Wisconsin, U.S.
- Died: February 22, 2012 (aged 74) Burbank, California, U.S.
- Genres: Jazz, rock, pop
- Occupations: Musician, composer, arranger
- Instrument: Piano
- Formerly of: The Wrecking Crew

Mike Melvoin (May 10, 1937 – February 22, 2012) was an American jazz pianist, composer, and arranger. He served as chairman and president of The Recording Academy and worked as a prolific studio musician, recording with Frank Sinatra, John Lennon, The Jackson 5, Natalie Cole, and The Beach Boys. Melvoin was nominated for the 2003 Grammy Award for Best Jazz Instrumental Solo for "All or Nothing at All" from his album It's Always You.

== Biography ==
Melvoin was born in Oshkosh, Wisconsin, and began playing the piano at the age of three. Melvoin, whose original family name was Mehlworm, was Jewish. He studied English at Dartmouth College, where he was a member of Sigma Nu. Upon graduating from Dartmouth in 1959, Melvoin decided to pursue a career in music. For a time he lived in NYC working as a pianist with top Latin bandleaders like Tito Puente and Machito as well as doing studio work. After moving to Los Angeles in 1961, he played with Frank Rosolino, Leroy Vinnegar, Gerald Wilson, Paul Horn, Terry Gibbs, Joe Williams, Peggy Lee and others. He released his debut album as a bandleader, Keys to Your Mind, in 1966 on Liberty Records. Melvoin played in clubs in Los Angeles, and accompanied singer Bill Henderson and played with Herb Ellis and Plas Johnson on Concord Jazz releases.

Melvoin worked extensively as a studio musician and was part of The Wrecking Crew, performing on the Beach Boys' Pet Sounds (1966), Frank Sinatra's That's Life (1966), the Jackson 5's ABC (1970), John Lennon's "Stand by Me" (1975), Tom Waits' Nighthawks at the Diner (1975), and Barbra Streisand's "Evergreen (Love Theme from A Star Is Born)" (1976). He worked in the early 1970s as a music director on The Partridge Family recordings, often playing keyboard, and also began composing for film and television including contributing scores to Fame and MacGyver.

His children, Wendy (of Prince's band The Revolution, and later of Wendy & Lisa), Susannah and Jonathan, all became professional musicians.

Melvoin was the first active musician to serve as the head of NARAS. When NARAS introduced category changes to the Grammys in 2011, which eliminated recognition for instrumental session musicians, he opposed them.

Melvoin died in Burbank, California, on February 22, 2012, of cancer, at age 74.

== Discography ==
=== As leader ===
- Keys to Your Mind (Liberty, 1966)
- Between the Two (Liberty, 1968)
- The Plastic Cow Goes Moooooog (Dot, 1969)
- Redeye (Voss, 1988)
- The Capitol Sessions (Naim, 1999)
- Oh Baby (City Light, 2002)
- It's Always You (City Light, 2003)
- Like Jazz (City Light, 2003)
- Playing the Word (City Light, 2006)
- You Know (City Light, 2006)

=== As backing musician ===
With Judy Collins

- Who Knows Where the Time Goes (Elektra, 1968)

With Stan Getz

- Children of the World (Columbia, 1979)

With Thelma Houston

- I've Got the Music in Me (Sheffield Lab, 1975)

With Lucio Battisti

- Io tu noi tutti (Numero Uno, 1977)

With José Feliciano

- Souled (RCA Victor, 1968)
- 10 to 23 (RCA Victor, 1969)
- And the Feeling's Good (RCA Victor, 1974)
- Ya Soy Tuyo (RCA International, 1985)

With Milt Jackson

- Memphis Jackson (Impulse!, 1969)

With Quincy Jones

- The Hot Rock OST (Prophesy, 1972)

With Peggy Lee

- I'm a Woman (Capitol Records, 1963)
- Mirrors (A&M Records, 1975)

With Helen Reddy

- Ear Candy (Capitol Records, 1977)

With Natalie Cole

- Unforgettable... with Love (Elektra Records, 1991)
- Take a Look (Elektra Records, 1993)

With Michael Bublé

- Michael Bublé (Reprise Records, 2003)
- Call Me Irresponsible (Reprise Records, 2007)

With Oliver Nelson

- Sound Pieces (Impulse, 1966)

With Johnny Rivers

- Last Boogie In Paris (live) (Atlantic Records, 1974)
- New Lovers and Old Friends (Epic Records, 1975)
- Wild Night (United Artists Records, 1976)
- Outside Help (Big Tree Records, 1977)

With Tim Buckley

- Look at the Fool (Rhino Records, 1974)

With Joe Pass

- Guitar Interludes (Discovery, 1969)

With Barbra Streisand

- The Movie Album (Columbia Records, 2003)

With Kenny Rogers

- Timepiece (Atlantic Records, 1994)

With Boz Scaggs

- Slow Dancer (Columbia Records, 1974)

With Rock Flowers

- Rock Flowers (Wheel/RCA, 1971)
- Naturally (Wheel/RCA, 1972)

With Barry Manilow

- Manilow Sings Sinatra (Arista Records, 1998)

With Donovan

- 7-Tease (Epic Records, 1974)

With Lalo Schifrin

- Music from Mission: Impossible (Dot, 1967)
- More Mission: Impossible (Paramount, 1968)
- Mannix (Paramount, 1968)
- Bullitt (soundtrack) (Warner Bros., 1968)
- Rock Requiem (Verve, 1971)
- Gypsies (Tabu, 1978)

With Juice Newton

- Juice Newton & Silver Spur (RCA Victor, 1975)

With Bud Shank

- Bud Shank Plays Music from Today's Movies (World Pacific, 1967)

With Gábor Szabó

- Light My Fire (Impulse!, 1967) with Bob Thiele
- Wind, Sky and Diamonds (Impulse!, 1967)
- 1969 (Skye, 1969)

With Leroy Vinnegar

- Leroy Walks Again!! (Contemporary, 1963)
- Jazz's Great "Walker" (Vee Jay, 1964)

With Tom Waits

- The Heart of Saturday Night (Asylum Records, 1974)
- Nighthawks at the Diner (Asylum Records, 1975)

With Paul Anka

- The Music Man (United Artists Records, 1977)

== Filmography ==
- The Main Event (1979) - Composer
- The Good Shepherd (2006) - Piano Player
