= Tom Bahler =

American singer-songwriter

- Born: Thomas Lee Bahler; June 1, 1943; Inglewood, California, U.S.
- Died: March 2, 2026 (aged 82)
- Occupations: Singer; songwriter; arranger; producer
- Years active: 1967–2026

Thomas Lee Bahler (also spelled Bähler; /ˈbeɪlər/; June 1, 1943 – March 2, 2026) was an American singer, composer, songwriter, arranger, producer and author. Bahler was most known for his song "She's Out of My Life", which was recorded by Michael Jackson; the song was originally written for Frank Sinatra, who never recorded it. He was the younger brother of the singer, arranger, conductor and composer John Bahler.

In Bahler's early career, he worked with Jan Berry (of Jan and Dean). Later, he and his brother John were vocalists in the Ron Hicklin Singers. Together with The Wrecking Crew, the Bahler brothers have sung, produced and arranged hundreds of worldwide hits. They were the featured background voices on The Partridge Family recordings in the 1970s.

== The Love Generation ==
John and Tom Bahler tried their hands with their own band, The Love Generation, which was not a great success. They made three records as a band. The last record, "Montage", is considered to be a project just by John and Tom. As session vocalists for The Partridge Family, they re-recorded the Screen Gems-published song "Let the Good Times In" for the series' pilot episode, which they had originally recorded for their first Love Generation album in a slightly different arrangement. The Partridge version of the song remained a heavily sought after unreleased track until it appeared officially for the first time on the group's Come on Get Happy!: The Very Best of The Partridge Family CD, which was released in 2005.

== The Going Thing ==
After "The Love Generation", John and Tom joined The Going Thing, a band which was devised by the advertising agency J. Walter Thompson (now known as JWT), to promote the products of the Ford Motor Company. Tom Bahler appeared on Ford's 1969 "Going Thing" television commercial.

== Later career ==
Bahler wrote the Bobby Sherman hit "Julie, Do Ya Love Me" (1970) and Cher's 1972 hit "Living in a House Divided". "She's Out of My Life", recorded by Michael Jackson and other artists, was written by Bahler in 1979. It has been claimed he wrote "She's Out of My Life" about Karen Carpenter, who broke up with Bahler after discovering he had fathered a child with another woman, but Bahler says the song was written about Rhonda Rivera. In 1985, he was the associate producer of the Grammy Award-winning "We Are the World", which he considers his most significant project.

Bahler was an associate of Quincy Jones. He has also worked with B. J. Thomas, Neil Diamond, Sonny & Cher, David Cassidy and Billy Joel.

For television and film, Bahler produced the music for the Miss USA, Miss Teen USA and Miss Universe Pageants for a number of years and he composed the music for a number of movies and scored a number of soundtracks. He made cameo appearances in movies such as Wag The Dog, also composing the song, "The American Dream" for the film.

== Death ==
Bahler died on March 2, 2026, at the age of 82, after a "long illness".

== Books ==
- Bahler, Thomas (April 17, 2013). Anything is Possible: A Tale of Æsop. Illustrated by Yulee Kim. Æsop Production Company. ISBN 978-0988527003.
- Bahler, Thomas (November 10, 2014). What You Want Wants You (1st ed.). Æsop Production Company. ISBN 978-0988527010.
