= John Bahler =

American singer

- Born: November 11, 1940 (age 85); New York City, New York, U.S.
- Origin: Inglewood, California, U.S.
- Occupation: Singer
- Years active: 1967–present
- Formerly of: Ron Hicklin Singers
- Website: Official website

John Bahler (born November 11, 1940; surname also spelled Bähler) is an American vocalist, arranger, conductor, composer and producer. He is the elder brother of singer Tom Bahler, and the husband of Janet Lennon of the Lennon Sisters.

== Career ==
Bahler and his brother Tom were vocalists in the Ron Hicklin Singers. Together with the Wrecking Crew, they are two of the most recorded singers in history, having appeared on hundreds of television show themes, movie soundtracks, top-40 hits (singing lead and backup), and commercial jingles of the 1960s through the 1980s.

John and Tom Bahler started the Love Generation, which showcased a jazz/pop fusion technical ability that later became synonymous with "the sound of 1970s commercial pop". Two of the album cuts were re-recorded by Bahler for the pilot of The Partridge Family.

After "the Love Generation", John and Tom Bahler, headed "The Going Thing", a band devised by the advertising agency J. Walter Thompson to promote the products of the Ford Motor Company. In early 2010, Bahler served as musical director for a PBS Marvin Hamlisch special. He runs Portraits by Bähler and conducts the Lawrence Welk orchestra.

== Personal life ==
As of 2015, John Bahler lives in Branson, Missouri. Bahler married Janet Lennon of The Lennon Sisters in 1976. They have two children together. He also has three step-children from Janet Lennon's first marriage.
