= David Cassidy discography =

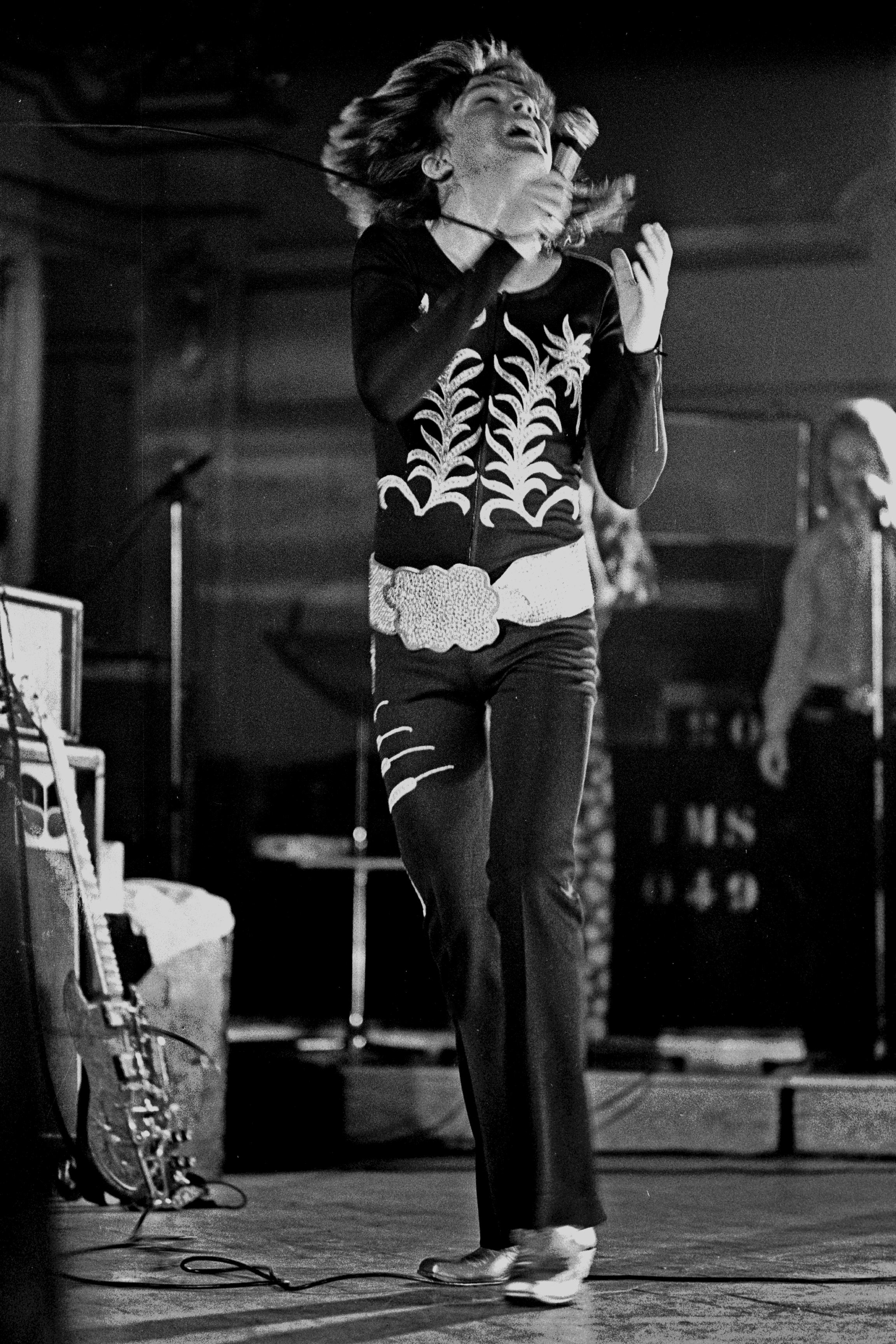
- Cassidy performing in 1973
- Studio albums: 11
- Extended plays: 3
- Soundtrack albums: 2
- Live albums: 4
- Compilation albums: 9
- Singles: 27
- Remix albums: 1

The discography of David Cassidy, an American pop artist, consists of eleven studio albums, four live albums, nine compilation albums, two soundtrack albums and twenty-seven singles. David Cassidy started recording albums in 1970. His career is most notable for his solo music and his recordings with the Partridge Family.

== Albums ==
=== Studio albums ===
Title	Album details	Peak chart positions							Certifications
Title	Album details	US	AUS	CAN	GER	JPN	NOR	UK	Certifications
Cherish	Released: February 1972; Label: Bell; Formats: LP, MC, 8-track	15	15	11	—	39	6	2	US: Gold
Rock Me Baby	Released: October 1972; Label: Bell; Formats: LP, MC, 8-track	41	46	44	9	—	—	2	
Dreams Are Nuthin' More Than Wishes	Released: October 1973; Label: Bell; Formats: LP, MC, 8-track	—	15	—	—	—	—	1	UK: Gold
The Higher They Climb	Released: July 1975; Label: RCA; Formats: LP, MC, 8-track	—	87	—	—	—	—	22	
Home Is Where the Heart Is	Released: March 1976; Label: RCA; Formats: LP, MC, 8-track	—	98	—	—	—	—	—	
Gettin' It in the Street	Released: October 1976; Label: RCA; Formats: LP, MC, 8-track	—	—	—	—	—	—	—	
Romance	Released: May 1985; Label: Arista; Formats: CD, LP, MC	—	50	—	22	—	—	20	UK: Silver
David Cassidy	Released: August 1990; Label: Enigma; Formats: CD, LP, MC	136	—	—	—	—	—	—	
Didn't You Used to Be...	Released: September 1992; Label: Scotti Bros.; Formats: CD, MC	—	—	—	—	—	—	—	
Old Trick New Dog	Released: September 1998; Label: Slamajama; Formats: CD	—	—	—	—	—	—	—	
A Touch of Blue	Released: November 3, 2003; Label: Universal Music; Formats: 2xCD; Includes a bonus disc containing re-recordings of hits	—	—	—	—	—	—	61	
"—" denotes releases that did not chart or were not released in that territory.

=== Live albums ===
Title	Album details	Peak chart positions			Certifications
Title	Album details	AUS	JPN	UK	Certifications
Cassidy Live!	Released: August 1974; Label: Bell; Formats: LP, MC	47	91	9	UK: Gold
His Greatest Hits – Live	Released: November 1986; Label: Starblend; Formats: CD, 2xLP, 2xMC	—	—	—	
Daydreamer	Released: 1993; Label: Star; Formats: CD	—	—	—	
Live in Concert	Released: 2002; Label: Warner Music; Formats: CD+DVD; Japan-only release	—	—	—	
"—" denotes releases that did not chart or were not released in that territory.

=== Theatrical cast recording albums ===
Title	Album details
Blood Brothers (with Shaun Cassidy and Petula Clark)	Released: 1995; Label: First Night/Relativity; Formats: CD
EFX	Released: 1997; Label: MGM Grand Hotel; Formats: CD

=== Remix albums ===
Title	Album details
David Cassidy Part II – The Remix	Released: February 27, 2007; Label: 180 Music; Formats: CD

=== Compilation albums ===
Title	Album details	Peak chart positions			Certifications
Title	Album details	US	AUS	UK	Certifications
Greatest Hits	Released: November 1974; Label: Bell; Formats: LP, MC, 8-track	—	—	—	UK: Silver
Forever	Released: 1975; Label: Sounds Superb; Formats: LP, MC; Largely consists of tracks from Cherish	—	—	—	
Best of David Cassidy	Released: August 21, 1992; Label: Curb; Formats: CD; Japan-only release consisting of unreleased recordings from 1979	—	—	—	
When I'm a Rock 'n' Roll Star – The David Cassidy Collection	Released: September 1996; Label: Razor & Tie; Formats: CD	—	—	—	
Classic Songs	Released: August 1998; Label: Curb; Formats: CD	—	—	—	
The Definitive Collection (with the Partridge Family)	Released: January 11, 2000; Label: Arista; Formats: CD	—	—	—	
Then and Now	Released: October 1, 2001; Label: Decca, Universal Music; Formats: CD; Consists of re-recordings	147	46	5	UK: Gold
Could It Be Forever... The Greatest Hits (with the Partridge Family)	Released: November 13, 2006; Label: Sony BMG; Formats: 2xCD	—	—	52	
The Bell Years 1972–1974	Released: September 27, 2019; Label: 7T's; Formats: 4xCD	—	—	—	
"—" denotes releases that did not chart or were not released in that territory.

== EPs ==
Title	EP details	Peak chart positions	
Title	EP details	US Jazz	US Trad Jazz
The E.P.	Released: November 1986; Label: Starblend; Formats: 7", 12"	—	—
David Cassidy Christmas	Released: November 13, 2016; Label: Big Music; Formats: digital download	—	—
Songs My Father Taught Me	Released: May 24, 2018; Label: Mixkitchen Musica; Formats: digital download	13	7
"—" denotes releases that did not chart or were not released in that territory.

== Singles ==
Title	Year	Peak chart positions										Certifications	Album
Title	Year	US	US AC	AUS	AUT	CAN	GER	IRE	NL	SA	UK	Certifications	Album
"Cherish"	1971	9	1	1	—	3	—	3 (Note: "Could It Be Forever" and "Cherish" were released as a double A-side in the UK and Ireland.)	—	—	2	US: Gold	Cherish
"Could It Be Forever"	1972	37	13	11	—	10	—	3	—	18	2		Cherish
"How Can I Be Sure"	1972	25	3	16	—	22	33	1	13	—	1		Rock Me Baby
"Rock Me Baby"	1972	38	—	15	14	31	9	13	11	—	11		Rock Me Baby
"I Am a Clown"	1973	—	—	32	7	—	12	9	13	—	3		Cherish
"Daydream"	1973	—	—	98	—	—	—	—	—	—	—		Dreams Are Nuthin' More Than Wishes
"Daydreamer" / "The Puppy Song"	1973	—	—	10	—	—	27	3	—	3	1		Dreams Are Nuthin' More Than Wishes
"If I Didn't Care"	1974	—	—	20	—	—	43	—	—	—	9		Non-album single
"Please Please Me"	1974	—	—	43	—	—	—	—	—	—	16		Cassidy Live!
"Get It Up for Love"	1975	—	—	85	—	—	—	13 (Note: "I Write the Songs" and "Get It Up for Love" were released as a double A-side in the UK and Ireland.)	—	7	11		The Higher They Climb
"I Write the Songs"	1975	—	—	—	—	—	—	13	—	—	11		The Higher They Climb
"Darlin'"	1975	—	—	—	—	—	38	20	—	1	16		The Higher They Climb
"Tomorrow"	1976	—	—	—	—	—	—	—	—	10	57 (Note: Chart position is from the official UK "Breakers List".)		Home Is Where the Heart Is
"Breakin' Down Again"	1976	—	—	—	—	—	—	—	—	—	—		Home Is Where the Heart Is
"Gettin' It in the Street"	1976	105	—	—	—	—	—	—	—	—	—		Gettin' It in the Street
"January" (Note: "January" was only released as a single in Germany and Southern Africa.)	1976	—	—	—	—	—	—	—	—	—	—		Home Is Where the Heart Is
"Saying Goodbye Ain't Easy (We'll Have to Go Away)"	1977	—	—	—	—	—	—	—	—	—	—		Gettin' It in the Street
"Hurt So Bad"	1979	—	—	—	—	—	—	—	—	—	—		Non-album single
"The Last Kiss"	1985	—	—	60	—	—	10	9	—	—	6		Romance
"Romance (Let Your Heart Go)"	1985	—	—	—	—	—	41	—	—	—	54		Romance
"Someone"	1985	—	—	—	—	—	—	—	—	—	86		Romance
"She Knows All About Boys" (Note: "She Knows All About Boys" was only released as a single in Continental Europe.)	1985	—	—	—	—	—	—	—	—	—	—		Romance
"Lyin' to Myself"	1990	27	25	—	—	17	—	—	—	—	—		David Cassidy
"For All the Lonely"	1992	—	—	—	—	—	—	—	—	—	—		Didn't You Used to Be...
"I Think I Love You" (promo-only release)	1998	—	—	—	—	—	—	—	—	—	—		Old Dog New Trick
"No Bridge I Wouldn't Cross" [airplay]	1998	—	23	—	—	—	—	—	—	—	—		Old Dog New Trick
"UFO (U Fine One)"	2012	—	—	—	—	—	—	—	—	—	—		Non-album single
"—" denotes releases that did not chart or were not released in that territory.

== See also ==
- The Partridge Family discography
