= Harry (album) =

Studio album by Harry Nilsson
- Released: August 1969
- Genre: Pop
- Length: 33:39
- Label: RCA Victor
- Producer: Harry Nilsson, Rick Jarrard

Harry Nilsson chronology
Skidoo (1968)	Harry (1969)	Nilsson Sings Newman (1970)

Singles from Harry
- 1. "Rainmaker" / "I Will Take You There" Released: November 1968; 2. "Maybe" / "Marchin' Down Broadway" Released: July 1969; 3. "Maybe" / "I Guess the Lord Must Be in New York City" Released: September 1969

Professional ratings
Review scores
Source	Rating
AllMusic	4/5 stars
Robert Christgau	B+
The Essential Rock Discography	6/10
MusicHound	2.5/5

Harry is the fourth studio album by Harry Nilsson, released August 1969 on RCA. It was his first album to get onto Billboard Magazine's Billboard 200 chart, remaining there for 15 weeks and reaching #120.

Harry features jazz saxophonist Tom Scott, pianist Mike Melvoin, flutist Jim Horn, session drummer Jim Gordon, Larry Knechtel on bass, and David Cohen and Howard Roberts on guitars.

The album does not have a distinctive style but ranges over ballads, show tunes, nostalgic Americana, and tin pan alley-like soft shoe numbers.

William E. Martin, who wrote the songs "Fairfax Rag" and "City Life" that Harry covered on Harry, and who collaborated with Nilsson on the song "Rainmaker," appears in a picture inside the gatefold version of the album wearing a bear suit that was made of an actual bear.

== Songs ==
=== The Puppy Song ===
Nilsson wrote this song at Paul McCartney's request for Mary Hopkin, an 18-year-old singer that McCartney had signed to Apple records and whose first album, Post Card, would feature her version of Nilsson's song. Nora Ephron would use Harry's own version for the opening credits of her 1998 film, You've Got Mail. Kenny Loggins covered it on his 2009 album All Join In.

Others have covered "The Puppy Song" as well: David Cassidy sang a cover of it and took it to a UK #1 as a double A-side single with the song "Daydreamer"; Victoria Williams covered it on For the Love of Harry: Everybody Sings Nilsson – a tribute album released in 1995; Astrud Gilberto performed a bossa nova lounge version on 2001's The Girl from Ipanema; and 70's Australian pop group New World released their cover on their Best of... album in 2002.

=== Open Your Window ===
Ella Fitzgerald covered this song on her album Ella, released in 1969, the same year as Harry. She also performed it live on Ella in Budapest, recorded in May 1970. In 1973, The 5th Dimension recorded the song for their album Living Together, Growing Together. In 1975, Louis Bellson recorded a cover for his album The Louis Bellson Explosion.

=== Mother Nature's Son ===
The Beatles once referred to this recording as their favorite Beatles cover song.

=== Mournin' Glory Story ===
This song, about a homeless woman's confusion and misery, has been covered by Melanie Safka, Bobby Graham, Jennifer Trynin, Jiffipop, and Al Kooper.

=== Maybe ===
Barbra Streisand covered this song on her 1971 album Stoney End. Karen Akers recorded a medley of "Maybe" and "Nevertheless, I'm in Love With You" on her 1990 album, In a Very Unusual Way. Richard Barnes recorded a cover for his only album, Richard Barnes, released in 1970.

=== Marchin' Down Broadway ===
This song is based on a song written by Bette Nilsson, Harry's mother.

=== I Guess the Lord Must Be in New York City ===
Nilsson wrote this song for the film Midnight Cowboy. Director John Schlesinger had been using Nilsson's cover of Fred Neil's "Everybody's Talkin'" as an example of the kind of song he wanted on the final soundtrack but then decided not to replace it. If "I Guess the Lord ..." had been included, it would have been eligible for an Oscar, as it was an original song. Harry Nilsson did win a Grammy Award for Best Male Pop Vocal Performance for "Everybody's Talkin'", however. "I Guess the Lord ..." was used in a film – 1971's La Mortadella (US title: Lady Liberty), starring Sophia Loren.

In 1969 a popular cover version of the song was released in UK by Eternal Triangle on the Decca Label.

Sinéad O'Connor recorded a cover of the song for the film You've Got Mail, but director Nora Ephron decided to use Nilsson's original. O'Connor's version appears on the soundtrack album.

Mac DeMarco also recorded a cover of this song for the debut Makeout Videotape EP 'Heat Wave!'.

=== Rainmaker ===
Co-written with William "Bill" Martin in 1968, this song has been covered by The Cryan Shames (non-album, 1969), Tom Northcott (#38 Canada 1970), Bobbie Gentry (Fancy, 1970), Michael Nesmith (Nevada Fighter, 1971) and The 5th Dimension (Love's Lines, Angles and Rhymes, 1971). Country group the Wright Brothers Band did a medley of this song together with "Dawson", in both studio and live versions, on the albums Cornfield Cowboys and Memorabila Box. The song charted for folk/rock singer Tom Northcott in Canada in 1970. It also appeared on Valdy's debut album Country Man in 1972. The song is also notable for its opening drum beat, which has been sampled by over thirty artists, including Cypress Hill, Method Man, and The Roots.

=== Simon Smith and the Amazing Dancing Bear ===
This is a cover of a song written by Randy Newman and popularized by the Alan Price Set. The song also appeared on an episode of The Muppet Show, performed by Fozzie Bear and Scooter.

Nilsson was impressed by Newman's talents and his next album was Nilsson Sings Newman, ten covers of songs by Newman, with Newman on piano and Nilsson doing vocals.

In 2000, BMG released a combined CD of Harry and Nilsson Sings Newman.

== Track listing ==
All tracks composed by Harry Nilsson, except where noted. All tracks arranged and conducted by George Tipton (* = produced by Rick Jarrard)

1. "The Puppy Song" – 2:43
2. "Nobody Cares About the Railroads Anymore" – 2:47
3. "Open Your Window" – 2:08 *
4. "Mother Nature's Son" (John Lennon, Paul McCartney) – 2:42
5. "Fairfax Rag" (Bill Martin) – 2:14
6. "City Life" (Bill Martin) – 2:31
7. "Mournin' Glory Story" – 2:13 *
8. "Maybe" – 3:10
9. "Marchin' Down Broadway" – 1:05 *
10. "I Guess the Lord Must Be in New York City" – 2:44
11. "Rainmaker" (Nilsson, Bill Martin) – 2:47
12. "Mr. Bojangles" (Jerry Jeff Walker) – 3:53
13. "Simon Smith and the Amazing Dancing Bear" (Randy Newman) – 2:47

BMG's 1997 reissue bonus tracks

14. "I Will Take You There" – 2:35
15. "Waiting" (non-LP single) – 2:18
16. "Rainmaker" (alternate single mix) – 2:25

Sony's 2009 reissue bonus tracks

14. "Waiting" (Non-LP Single Version) – 2:22
15. "Rainmaker" (Mono Version) – 2:26
16. "Wasting My Time" - 3:33
