= EFX =

EFX may refer to:

- EFX (show), a Las Vegas show
- EFX (album), an album of the show
- Enerflex Systems, a Canadian company listed as EFX on the Toronto Stock Exchange
- Equifax, a U.S. consumer credit reporting agency listed as EFX on the New York Stock Exchange
- Effects Extension (EFX), a set of digital signal processing extensions for the OpenAL audio API
- .efx, the Everett Efax file format, see List of file formats
- EFX item allocation - a rule for fair allocation of indivisible objects among people with different preferences.

== See also ==
- FX (disambiguation)
- Das EFX, an American hip-hop group
