= Eternal Triangle =

London-based pop group

Eternal Triangle were a London-based pop group managed by Julia Morley. They were an early act to cover Harry Nilsson songs, releasing their version of "I Guess the Lord Must Be in New York City" on Decca Records in 1969.

The group was based in Chelsea and the members were Sally Kemp, Bill Thacker and Billy Butler.

== See also ==
- William 'Billy' Butler
