= Rosa's Cantina =

Rosa's Cantina may refer to:

- "Rosa's Cantina", a song by David Cassidy from his 1976 album Gettin' It in the Streets
- "Rosa's Cantina", a song by Deep Purple from their 1996 album Purpendicular
