= Then and Now (David Cassidy album) =

Compilation album by David Cassidy
- Released: April 30, 2002
- Genre: Pop
- Length: 48:20
- Label: Decca
- Producer: Ted Carfrae

David Cassidy chronology
When I'm a Rock 'n' Roll Star (1996)	Then and Now (2002)	A Touch of Blue (2003)

Professional ratings
Review scores
Source	Rating
AllMusic	3/5 stars

Then and Now is a compilation album by David Cassidy, released in 2002. It became a hit in the UK, where it reached number 5 on the albums chart and ultimately achieved Platinum sales status. It contained new recordings of songs previously released on other albums.

The US version of the album moved away from the emphasis on Cassidy's UK music career and featured a different track listing, one that was more reflective of his hits in the US. Gone were the songs "Daydreamer", "I Write the Songs", "Some Kind of a Summer", "If I Didn't Care" and "The Last Kiss". These were replaced with updated versions of Cassidy's recordings of "No Bridge I Wouldn't Cross (Young & Gifted Mix)" and The Partridge Family theme "C'mon, Get Happy", plus a new recording of the song "Do You Believe in Magic", which David had also performed in a Christmas television advertisement for the Mervyn's department store. The different versions of this album ensured both were eagerly sought after by fans worldwide.

== Track listing ==
1. "I Think I Love You"
2. "Could It Be Forever"
3. "How Can I Be Sure"
4. "I Woke Up In Love This Morning"
5. "Daydreamer"
6. "I Can Feel Your Heartbeat"
7. "It's One of Those Nights (Yes Love)"
8. "I Write the Songs"
9. "Rock Me Baby"
10. "Some Kind Of A Summer"
11. "Looking Through the Eyes of Love"
12. "I'll Meet You Halfway"
13. "If I Didn't Care"
14. "Cherish"
15. "The Last Kiss"
16. "Ain't No Sunshine"
17. "Lyin' To Myself"
18. "Cry"
19. "No Bridge I Wouldn't Cross"
20. "Sheltered In Your Arms"
21. "Ricky's Tune"
22. "Could It Be Forever (Feat. Hear'Say)

== Personnel ==
Musicians:

- Drums - Mike Bradley, Hal Blaine
- Bass - Steve Pearce, Max Bennett
- Piano/Keyboards - Pete Murray
- Fender Rhodes - Michael Smith
- Guitars - Hugh Burns, Fridrick Karlsson, Jimmy McIntosh, Dennis Budimir, Louie Shelton
- Percussion - Frank Ricotti, Gary Coleman
- Piano Accordion - Eddie Hession
- Harmonica - Brenden Power
- Harpsichord - Alexander Skeaping
- Recorder - Paul Fawcus
- Violins: Harvey De Souza, Laurence Jackson, Darrell Kok, Jan Schmolk, Ralph De Souza, Simon Smith, Sarah Ewins, Steve Morris
- Viola: Bob Smissen, Tim Grant
- Cello: Jo Knight, William Schofield

Woodwind:

- Saxophone and Flute - Paul Fawcus, Scott Garland

Brass:

- Trumpet and Flugal - Pat White, Mark Cumberland
- Trombone - Dennis Rollins

Background vocals:

- David Cassidy - Background vocals on "Ain't No Sunshine"
- Ted Carfrae - Harmony vocal on "I Write The Songs"
- Mae McKenna, Janet Mooney, Lance Ellington, Phil Nicholl, Candace Davis Martin, Lisa Mayer, John Bahlor, Tom Bahlor, Randy Crenshaw, Jackie Ward
