= When I'm a Rock 'n' Roll Star =

Compilation album by David Cassidy
- Released: 1996
- Label: Razor and Tie Records

David Cassidy chronology
David Cassidy's Partridge Family Favorites	When I'm a Rock 'n' Roll Star	Then and Now

When I'm a Rock 'n' Roll Star is an album by David Cassidy. Released on Razor and Tie Records in 1996 as RE 2117–2, it is a compilation of songs drawn from his three RCA Records albums recorded in 1975 and 1976: The Higher They Climb The Harder They Fall (1975), Home Is Where the Heart Is (1976), and Gettin' It in the Streets (1976).

The opening dozen tracks feature a mix of material from the 1975 and 1976 albums, the final three tracks are drawn from Gettin' It in the Street. Most of the material is self-composed, mainly with others. Singers, musicians and co-composers include; Beach Boy Carl Wilson. Gerry Beckley and Dewey Bunnell of the band America and noted West Coast session players of the period including guitarist Bill House and bassist Brian Garofalo.

"Tomorrow" is a cover of Paul McCartney, a track from the 1971 Wings LP Wild Life. Cassidy's version became a Top 10 hit in South Africa in 1976.

The title track was used in the film Bronson, where it's performed by the titular character as portrayed by Tom Hardy.

== Track listing ==
1. "Get It Up for Love"
2. "Damned If This Ain't Love"
3. "January"
4. "Darlin'"
5. "When I'm a Rock 'n' Roll Star"
6. "I Write the Songs"
7. "Common Thief"
8. "On Fire"
9. "Tomorrow"
10. "Fix of Your Love"
11. "Breakin' Down Again"
12. "Take This Heart"
13. "Gettin' It in the Street"
14. "Cruise to Harlem"
15. "I'll Have to Go Away (Saying Goodbye)"
