= Greatest Hits (David Cassidy album) =

Compilation album by David Cassidy
- Released: 1974
- Genre: Rock
- Length: 35:47
- Labels: Bell, Arista
- Producers: Wes Farrell, David Cassidy, Barry Ainsworth, Michael Lloyd

David Cassidy chronology
Cassidy Live! (1974)	Greatest Hits (1974)	The Higher They Climb (1975)

Greatest Hits is a compilation album by David Cassidy, initially released in 1974 by Bell Records.

This album contains songs that were recorded during the first phase of David Cassidy's musical career. All of the songs contained in this collection were recorded between 1970 and 1974 during the time he was starring in The Partridge Family television series. Of the eleven songs contained in this compilation, three songs were taken from Partridge Family albums and the song "If I Didn't Care" had only been released as a single in Europe and was not available in the U.S. prior to this album. Note a mispress on the album: "Could It Be Forever" was apparently removed at the eleventh hour and replaced by "Blind Hope" without notation on either the record label or the rear of sleeve.

== Track listing ==
=== Side 1 ===
1. "Cherish" (Terry Kirkman) – 3:46
2. "Doesn't Somebody Want to Be Wanted" (Wes Farrell, Jim Cretecos, Mike Appel) – 2:46
3. "Daydreamer'" (Terry Dempsy) – 2:46
4. "Please Please Me" (Live) (John Lennon, Paul McCartney) – 1:57
5. "Could It Be Forever" (Wes Farrell, Danny Janssen) – 2:16
6. "If I Didn't Care" (Jack Lawrence) – 3:16

=== Side 2 ===
1. "How Can I Be Sure" (Felix Cavaliere, Eddie Brigati) – 3:06
2. "I Think I Love You" (Tony Romeo) – 2:52
3. "Rock Me Baby" (Johnny Cymbal, Peggy Clinger) – 3:52
4. "I Am a Clown" (Tony Romeo) – 4:35
5. "I'll Meet You Halfway" (Wes Farrell, Gerry Goffin) – 4:35

== Production notes ==
Produced by Wes Farrell, except

- "Please, Please Me" Produced by David Cassidy and Barry Ainsworth
- "If I Didn't Care" Produced by David Cassidy and Michael Lloyd

== Release notes ==
This album was released in United States in 1974 by Bell Records under the catalog number Bell 1321.
The catalog number was changed in 1976 to Arista 2014.
