= It's One of Those Nights (Yes Love) =

Single by The Partridge Family

from the album Shopping Bag
- B-side: "One Night Stand"
- Released: December 1971
- Genre: Pop
- Length: 3:39
- Label: Bell Records
- Songwriter(s): Tony Romeo
- Producer(s): Wes Farrell

The Partridge Family singles chronology
"Am I Losing You" (1972)	"It's One of Those Nights (Yes Love)" (1971)	"Breaking Up Is Hard to Do" (1972)

"It's One of Those Nights (Yes Love)" is a song written by Tony Romeo and was recorded by The Partridge Family for their 1972 album, Shopping Bag. The song went to number 2 on the Adult Contemporary chart and reached number 20 on The Billboard Hot 100 in 1972 .

The song went to number 9 in Canada in January 1972, number 11 in the United Kingdom in February of the year, and number 25 in Australia in March 1972.

The B-side to the single was "One Night Stand" written by Paul Anka and Wes Farrell, featured on the previous album, Sound Magazine

"It's One of Those Nights" was very popular in Chicago, where it reached number seven on the WLS survey.

== Chart history ==
=== Weekly charts ===
Chart (1971–72)	Peak position
Australia KMR	25
Canada RPM Top Singles	9
Canada RPM Adult Contemporary	7
Ireland (IRMA)	17
UK (OCC)	11
US Billboard Hot 100	20
US Billboard Adult Contemporary	2
US Cash Box Top 100	13

=== Year-end charts ===
Chart (1972)	Rank
US (Joel Whitburn's Pop Annual)	155

== Cover versions ==
- David Cassidy on his 2001 album, Then and Now
