= A Touch of Blue =

Studio album by David Cassidy
- Released: 2003
- Genre: Easy Listening, Pop, 70's Pop
- Length: Disc 1 – 36:41; Disc 2 – 33:27
- Label: Universal Music
- Producer: Ted Carfrae

David Cassidy chronology
Then and Now (2002)	A Touch of Blue (2003)	David Cassidy Part II – The Remix (2007)

Professional ratings
Review scores
Source	Rating
AllMusic	3/5 stars

A Touch of Blue was David Cassidy's 17th and final studio album. A bonus disc was included with this album that contained re-recorded versions of Cassidy's previous songs.

== Track listing ==
No.	Title	Length
1.	"Spooky"	3:34
2.	"New York City Life"	3:16
3.	"Blackbird"	2:41
4.	"Since I Fell for You"	2:53
5.	"Walk Away Renee"	3:25
6.	"Breaking Up Is Hard to Do"	2:58
7.	"Hollywood Nights"	4:20
8.	"A Song for You"	4:26
9.	"Mother and Child Reunion"	3:29
10.	"More Than Words"	5:19

Bonus Album
No.	Title	Length
1.	"Could It Be Forever"	2:39
2.	"Cherish"	4:09
3.	"How Can I Be Sure"	3:07
4.	"Daydreamer"	2:49
5.	"Some Kind of A Summer"	3:43
6.	"I Write the Songs"	4:08
7.	"If I Didn't Care"	3:07
8.	"Looking Through the Eyes of Love"	3:07
9.	"It's One of Those Nights (Yes Love)"	3:44
10.	"I Think I Love You"	2:54
