= Cassidy Live! =

Live album by David Cassidy
- Released: 1974
- Recorded: 1974
- Genre: Rock
- Length: 46:33
- Label: Bell
- Producer: David Cassidy, Barry Ainsworth

David Cassidy chronology
Dreams Are Nuthin' More Than Wishes (1973)	Cassidy Live! (1974)	Greatest Hits (1974)

Professional ratings
Review scores
Source	Rating
Džuboks	unfavorable

Professional ratings
Review scores
Source	Rating
Allmusic	3/5 stars

Cassidy Live! is the first live album by American singer and actor David Cassidy, and his final album released by Bell Records. It was released in 1974 and was recorded live in Britain. It was produced by Cassidy and Barry Ainsworth. The recording captures some of the mass hysteria that surrounded Cassidy's live performances at that time. It peaked at #9 on the UK album charts.

"Please Please Me" was released as single from this album in the UK where it reached #16 on the British singles chart. The album failed to have much of an impact in the U.S. partially due to Bell Records' mid-1970s slump and that label's scheduled transition into Arista Records the following year.

== Reception ==
Writing for Allmusic, critic Dave Thompson wrote, "Recorded live on his 1974 world tour, at the height (and, though nobody knew it, in the final days) of Cassidy-mania, Cassidy Live is a peculiar document, on the one hand standing as an indication of just how fierce the hysteria around the lad was, but, on the other, living proof of what a sensational showman he was." Thompson summed up his review by saying, "Rock history has sidelined Cassidy with a finality that seems almost personal, shovelling him up a teen idol side street from which the only escape was retirement and resignation. Cassidy Live, however, was recorded while he still thought he had a chance of advancing -- and few period live albums come even close to capturing its excitement."

== Track listing ==
1. "It's Preying On My Mind" (David Cassidy, Kim Carnes, Dave Ellingson) – 4:05
2. "Some Kind of a Summer" (Dave Ellingson) – 3:34
3. "Breaking Up Is Hard To Do" (Neil Sedaka, Howard Greenfield) – 3:12
4. "Bali Ha'i / Mae" (Oscar Hammerstein II, Richard Rodgers / Gary Montgomery) – 3:52
5. "I Am a Clown" (Tony Romeo) – 3:20
6. "Delta Lady" (Leon Russell) – 4:04
7. "Please Please Me" (John Lennon, Paul McCartney) – 2:02
8. "Daydreamer" (Terry Dempsey) – 2:08
9. "How Can I Be Sure" (Felix Cavaliere, Eddie Brigati) – 2:54
10. "For What It's Worth" (Stephen Stills) – 5:36
11. "C.C. Rider Blues / Jenny Jenny" (Ma Rainey, Enotris Johnson / Richard Penniman) – 4:56
12. Rock Medley: – 6:35
  1. "Blue Suede Shoes" (Carl Perkins)
  2. "(We're Gonna) Rock Around The Clock" (Max C. Freedman, James E. Myers) (as Jimmy DeKnight)
  3. "Jailhouse Rock" (Jerry Leiber, Mike Stoller)
  4. "Rock and Roll Music" (Chuck Berry)
  5. "Rock Me Baby" (Peggy Clinger, Johnny Cymbal)

== Personnel ==
- Michael Been – Bass and Background Vocals
- Richard Delvy – Percussion
- Henry Diltz – Harmonica and Background Vocals
- Gloria Grinel – Background Vocals, Claps, Tambourine
- Steve Ross – Lead Guitar
- Trish Turner – Background Vocals, Claps, Tambourine

Drums - Scott Musick

== Production notes ==
- Produced by David Cassidy and Barry Ainsworth
- Engineered by Barry Ainsworth

=== 2012 Reissue on Compact Disc ===
- Reissue Produced by Gordon Anderson and Jim Pierson
- Sony Producer: Rob Santos
- Remastered by Vic Anesini at Battery Studios, NYC
