= You've Got Mail (soundtrack) =

Soundtrack album by Various Artists
- Released: December 1, 1998
- Genre: Original soundtrack
- Label: Atlantic

Professional ratings
Review scores
Source	Rating
Allmusic	3/5 stars

You've Got Mail is a soundtrack album from the 1998 film of the same name.

== Background ==
The soundtrack was released on December 1, 1998 under Atlantic Records, and features a mixture of classics from the 1960s and 1970s, particularly the work of Harry Nilsson with three songs, as well as new original recordings and covers. The score to the film was written by the English composer George Fenton and was released separately.

== Track listing ==
1. Harry Nilsson - "The Puppy Song" - 2:43
2. The Cranberries - "Dreams" - 4:31
3. Bobby Darin - "Splish Splash" - 2:12
4. Louis Armstrong - "Dummy Song" - 2:19
5. Harry Nilsson - "Remember" - 4:02
6. Roy Orbison - "Dream" - 2:12
7. Bobby Day - "Rockin' Robin" - 2:36
8. Randy Newman - "Lonely at the Top" - 2:32
9. Stevie Wonder - "Signed, Sealed, Delivered I'm Yours" - 2:38
10. Harry Nilsson - "I Guess the Lord Must Be in New York City" - 3:08
11. Harry Nilsson - "Over the Rainbow" - 3:31
12. Carole King - "Anyone At All" - 3:09
13. Billy Williams - "I'm Gonna Sit Right Down and Write Myself a Letter" - 2:08
14. George Fenton - "The 'You've Got Mail' Suite" - 5:36
15. Jimmy Durante - "You Made Me Love You" - 3:04

== Other songs from the film ==
The song "Never Smile at a Crocodile" is featured in the film (in the scene where Joe first meets Kathleen in her bookstore) but is not on the soundtrack album. Also, although the movie features Harry Nilsson's original version of "I Guess The Lord Must Be In New York City," it does not appear on the soundtrack album. The Sinéad O'Connor "cover version" featured on the soundtrack album is heard only during the closing credits of the film.

== Certifications ==
Region	Certification	Certified units/sales
United States (RIAA)	Gold	500,000^{^}
^{^} Shipments figures based on certification alone.
