= Old Trick New Dog =

Studio album by David Cassidy
- Released: September 1998
- Label: Slamajama
- Producers: Dino Esposito, Peter Brunetta, Scot Rammer

David Cassidy chronology
Didn't You Used to Be... (1992)	Old Trick New Dog (1998)	David Cassidy's Partridge Family Favorites

Old Trick New Dog is a 1998 album from David Cassidy on his own Slamajama Records label. In addition to new songs, it also features several remakes of songs from The Partridge Family. The single lifted from the album – No Bridge I Wouldn't Cross – was an Adult Contemporary Top 25 hit in the USA. The track You Were The One was co-written by David Cassidy and Tony Romeo who wrote many of the most popular songs for Cassidy and The Partridge Family in the 1970s, including I Think I Love You, Summer Days, I Am A Clown and Sing Me. It was the last studio album Cassidy released before his death.

== Release ==
The album was released by itself and also as a two-pack with David Cassidy's Partridge Family Favorites.

== Track listing ==
1. "No Bridge I Wouldn't Cross"
2. "I Think I Love You"
3. "You Were the One"
4. "Let Her Go"
5. "I Can Feel Your Heartbeat"
6. "I Woke Up In Love This Morning"
7. "(Whatever Happened To) Peace, Love & Happiness"
8. "Sheltered in Your Arms"
9. "Show and Tell"
10. "Ricky's Tune"
11. "I Think I Love You [Groove Mix]" [Bonus track]

== Reception ==
The album was given mostly positively reviews, with music review site Pause&Play was called "fresh and contemporary, with a tip of the hat to the 48-year-old Cassidy’s past" and the Hartford Courant saying "on the whole, the 10-song CD is passable."
