= Romance (David Cassidy album) =

Studio album by David Cassidy
- Released: 1985
- Recorded: 1985
- Studios: RG Jones, London
- Genre: Pop rock
- Label: Arista
- Producer: Alan Tarney

David Cassidy chronology
Gettin' It in the Street (1976)	Romance (1985)	David Cassidy (1990)

Romance is David Cassidy's seventh studio album as a solo artist and his first released by Arista Records. Released in 1985, Romance was the only studio album Cassidy released during the 1980s. Since growing out of his teen idol fame from The Partridge Family, Cassidy continued to try to re-invent his music career; however, in the United States, his latter albums from the 1970s did not chart. Therefore, for the album Romance, Arista excluded a US release and released the album only in Europe, Israel, Japan, South Africa and Australia.

Romance peaked at number 20 on the UK Albums Chart in June 1985. George Michael sang on the song, "The Last Kiss" (originally recorded with different lyrics by Cliff Richard in 1981 as "Young Love"). It peaked at number 6 on the UK Singles Chart, and charted all over Europe and in Australia. Subsequent singles from the album—"Romance (Let Your Heart Go)", "Someone" and "She Knows All About Boys"—were minor hits in comparison. The album written prior to, and after the marriage of Cassidy to Meryl Tanz, was written about their marriage and Cassidy gave both Meryl and her daughter Caroline thanks for the two years it took to bring it to fruition.

The album was produced by Alan Tarney. Tarney also wrote or co-wrote (with Cassidy) all songs on the album with the exception of "She Knows All About Boys".

== Track listing ==
All tracks composed by David Cassidy and Alan Tarney; except where indicated

1. "Romance (Let Your Heart Go)" with Basia on vocals
2. "Touched by Lightning"
3. "The Last Kiss" with George Michael on vocals
4. "Thin Ice"
5. "Someone" (Cassidy, Alan Tarney, Sally Boyden)
6. "The Letter"
7. "Heart of Emotion"
8. "Tenderly" (Alan Tarney)
9. "She Knows All About Boys" (Dan Merino)
10. "Remember Me" (Alan Tarney)
