= Live in Concert =

Live in Concert may refer to:

== Albums ==
- Live in Concert (2 Live Crew album), 1990
- Live in Concert (Electric Fields and Melbourne Symphony Orchestra album), 2024
- Live in Concert (Freda Payne album), 1999
- Live in Concert (Kim Burrell album), 2001
- Live in Concert (Gin Blossoms album), 2009
- Live in Concert (The Jesus and Mary Chain album), 2003
- Live in Concert (Lou Reed album), originally Live in Italy, 1984
- Live in Concert (Manafest album), 2011
- Live in Concert (Martina McBride album), 2008
- Live in Concert (Melbourne Welsh Male Choir album), 2002
- Live in Concert (Najwa Karam album), 2001
- Live in Concert (Natalie Merchant album), 1999
- Live in Concert (Ray Charles album), 1965
- Live in Concert (Sad Café album), 1981
- Live in Concert 1972/73, by Deep Purple, 2005
- Live in Concert 1977 & 1979, by Bad Company, 2016
- Live in Concert 1979, by Amanda Lear, 1980
- Live in Concert 1998, by Bootsy Collins, 1998
- Live in Concert 2006, by Barbra Streisand, 2007
- Live in Concert 2010, by Dizzy Mizz Lizzy, 2010
- Live in Concert! Greatest Hits and More, by the Smithereens, 2008
- Wanted: Live in Concert, a comedy album by Richard Pryor, 1978
- Live in Concert November 4th, 2001, by Eric's Trip, 2001

== EPs ==
- Live in Concert (EP), by Wiz Khalifa and Currensy, 2013
- Live in Concert, by Lorde, 2013

== Film and video ==
- Live in Concert (video), by Cher, 1999
- Richard Pryor: Live in Concert, a 1979 stand-up comedy film by Richard Pryor

== Radio ==
- Live in Concert, now Radio 3 in Concert, a BBC Radio 3 classical music programme
