= Lady Liberty (film) =

1971 Italian-French film

- Directed by: Mario Monicelli
- Written by: Leonard Melfi; Suso Cecchi D'Amico; Don Carlos Dunaway; Ring Lardner Jr. (uncredited)
- Produced by: Carlo Ponti
- Starring: Sophia Loren; William Devane; Gigi Proietti; Susan Sarandon; Danny DeVito
- Cinematography: Alfio Contini
- Edited by: Ruggero Mastroianni
- Music by: Ron-Lucio Dalla
- Production companies: Compagnia Cinematografica Champion; Les Films Concordia
- Distributed by: United Artists (United States and Canada); Warner Bros. (International)
- Release dates: 23 December 1971 (Italy); 7 June 1972 (USA)
- Running time: 97 minutes
- Countries: Italy; France; United States
- Language: English

Lady Liberty (Italian: La mortadella) is a 1971 comedy film directed by Mario Monicelli and starring Sophia Loren, William Devane, Gigi Proietti, Susan Sarandon, Danny DeVito, and Edward Herrmann in his film debut.

It was shot at the Cinecittà Studios in Rome and on location in Emilia-Romagna and New York City. The film's sets were designed by art director Mario Garbuglia.

== Synopsis ==
Maddalena Ciarrapico arrives in New York City from Italy to get married and brings her fiancé a gift of mortadella (large Italian pork sausage) from her co-workers at the sausage factory where she used to work.She is refused permission to bring the mortadella into the country, though, because of the ban on meat which may contain food-borne diseases. An indignant Maddalena refuses to hand the sausage over, staying in the customs office at the airport, sparking a diplomatic incident in which she attracts widespread sympathy and support.

== Cast ==
- Sophia Loren as Maddalena Ciarrapico
- William Devane as Jock Fenner
- Gigi Proietti as Michael Bruni
- Beeson Carroll as Dominic
- David Doyle as O'Henry
- Danny DeVito as Fred Mancuso
- Susan Sarandon as Sally

== Soundtrack ==
A song by Harry Nilsson, "I Guess the Lord Must Be in New York City," was included in the movie.

== Reception ==
The New York Times was scathing in its review of the film, observing that "Probably no other woman has so triumphantly survived as many rotten movies in such a short space of time as Sophia Loren." Although "the farcical premise is promising" it was "a comedy that manages to be both too serious and not serious enough and that, at no point matches the level of the humor and intelligence of its principal performance". It also questioned "the grindingly bleak New York settings in which so much of the film is set".
