= EFX (show) =

Las Vegas production show (1995–2002)

- Date of premiere: March 25, 1995
- Final show: December 31, 2002
- Location: MGM Grand Hotel & Casino, Paradise

EFX was a Las Vegas Strip production show residing at the MGM Grand Hotel & Casino which opened on March 23, 1995 and closed on December 31, 2002. When it premiered, it was the most expensive and largest-scaled theater installation in the world. A significant entertainment landmark of the strip for nearly eight years, it was known for changing its headline star every two years. Performers in the lead role were Michael Crawford, David Cassidy, Tommy Tune, and Rick Springfield.

== Michael Crawford version, 1995 ==
=== Plot ===
The original production of EFX featured a loose plot involving the celebration of the human mind. The EFX Master, in charge of EFX, a world where "anything is possible" thanks to imagination, invites the audience to relive their childhood innocence and wonder by taking them on a journey through four different stories: those of Merlin and King Arthur, a futuristic P.T. Barnum and his alien circus, the last days of Harry Houdini, and H.G. Wells' classic novella, The Time Machine. Each story was its own "act", and was introduced by a "helper" of the EFX Master's based upon their "mastership" of that story's overall theme.

After being introduced to the world of EFX, the EFX Master transforms himself into Merlin as the Master of Magic tells the audience that they are about enter the time of a young Arthur, before he became king. Arthur begs Merlin to teach him about magic, and Merlin explains that Arthur first needs to learn how to live in harmony with nature. Their lesson is interrupted by the arrival of the witch Morgana, who seeks to kill Arthur to keep him from fulfilling his destiny of becoming king. Merlin and Morgana duke it out as giant dragons in a fiery on-stage battle before Arthur pulls the sword from the stone and defeats the evil sorceress. The audience is left with the message that "good must triumph always."

The Master of Laughter then sends us deep into outer space where we meet up with the EFX Master, now P.T. Barnum, and his crazy alien circus. Mishaps and hilarity abound as the intergalactic ensemble perform, and, led by the assistant Vladimir, eventually try to upstage the ringmaster Barnum. This act of the show is the one that was the most re-written. It originally featured a long, innuendo-laced solo-stand-up act by Barnum that included a mind-reading trick involving playing cards and audience participation, an evade-the-blade stunt with the ill-fated Martian Mingo-Sniffer named Muffy, and a juggling act using the cannonballs of Bull Run. The card trick was quickly cut from the show, and Bull Run was reworked to become part of a human cannonball stunt, which gets botched up nicely by Vladimir. Barnum was also supposed to dance the entire Irish jig with the cast, but a hip injury sustained during one of the many stunts left Michael Crawford unable to dance for long, and the number was re-staged to feature just the ensemble performing the jig while Barnum tries in vain to catch Vladimir in an effort to stop his assistant from upstaging him.

After leaving the Intergalactic Circus of Wonders, the Master of Spirits appears and asks us if we wish to make contact with the other side. The audience is then brought to a seance led by Bess Houdini in which she asks to speak to the spirit of her dead husband, the famous illusionist Harry Houdini. The EFX Master, as Houdini, appears, and he and Bess reunite briefly to relive various moments of their past, starting with the night that they first met at one of Houdini's escapes. Upon being reminded of Harry's dangerous career, a disillusioned Bess asks Houdini if he ever really loved her, or if his feelings were really an illusion like his many tricks: "Did you just make me believe that you loved me and not even care enough to stay alive?" We then see Houdini's death, drowning in a water tank before freeing himself from his chains, and Houdini tells Bess, "There's nothing here on Earth that is stronger than the love that I have for you. I only wish I learned that sooner." They then say their goodbyes, promising to be reunited again someday.

The final act is introduced by the Master of Time, who asks us if we are brave enough to see what the years ahead have in store for us. He takes us to see the EFX Master, who has now become H.G. Wells. Wells expresses his amazement that his novel The Time Machine has been so enthusiastically received by the public, and goes on to explain that his own personal interest in the story lies in the scientific possibility of actually traveling through time for research purposes. He has even built a real time machine, but is hesitant to use it, citing the "effects on future generations not yet shaped. It could be dangerous." The Master of Time urges him to "take the journey you've always dreamed of", adding that sometimes the risks are worth it. Wells agrees, and uses the time machine to enter the far-distant future, an effect achieved through a 3D music video projected onto a scrim during the scene change. Wells arrives in a beautiful garden to find that the surviving human population has been enslaved by a race of reptilian-like creatures, the Morlocks, who force the humans to work underground. The Morlocks steal the time machine while Wells befriends one of the female slaves who managed to escape. Together, Wells and the slave girl enter the caves to free the other slaves and take back the time machine. After successfully defeating the Morlocks, the slave girl tries to persuade Wells into taking her back with him. He refuses and she kisses him. Moved by the kiss, and an earthquake, Wells agrees to let the slave girl join him, and together they travel back to his own time.

The EFX Master then appears one final time, this time as himself, and with the entire cast, he praises the human imagination and encourages us to continue to create incredible tales and believe in ourselves and our capacity for creation. We're asked to open ourselves up to infinite possibilities.

=== Casting ===
EFX was originally conceived as a showcase for performer Michael Crawford, who was fresh off his four-year run in The Phantom of the Opera and enjoying a successful solo career at the time. Crawford jumped at the opportunity to showcase his talents, and the result was his being cast as all five of the show's main characters, which included Crawford revisiting the role of P.T. Barnum, a role he originated in the West End production of the Cy Coleman musical Barnum. Tina Walsh and Kevin Koelbl doubled-up on a few supporting roles, while Jeffrey Polk, Stewart Daylida, Rick Stockwell, Lisa Geist, and over seventy ensemble members rounded out the rest of the cast.

==== Cast ====
- The EFX Master, Merlin, P.T. Barnum, Harry Houdini, and H.G. Wells: Michael Crawford
- Morgana and Bess Houdini: Tina Walsh
- The Master of Spirits and Vladimir: Kevin Koelbl
- The Master of Magic: Jeffrey Polk
- The Master of Laughter: Stewart Daylida
- The Master of Time: Rick Stockwell
- Young King Arthur: Lisa Geist

=== Creative team ===
EFX was originally created by Gary Goddard and Tony Christopher, with additional material and dialogue provided by Michael Crawford and Bruce Vilanch, respectively. The show was directed by Scott Faris and Anthony Van Laast, who also provided the choreography, followed by Arlene Phillips who took over as director and choreographer. Theoni V. Aldredge provided the costumes. The Animatronic Dragon Morgana featured in the show was produced by Advanced Animations.

The original music was composed by Don Grady, Ted King, Gary Goddard, Andy Belling, B. A. Robertson, and Michael Crawford, and featured lyrics by Doug Brayfield, Ted King, Gary Goddard, Andy Belling, Marty Panzer, and B. A. Robertson. Composer John Barry's theme from the film Somewhere in Time was also used as pre-show music during the show's original 1995 run. Barry, who had worked with Michael Crawford before on previous projects such as the West End musical Billy and the British movie musical of Alice's Adventures in Wonderland, gave Crawford permission to add vocals to the Somewhere in Time theme. Lyrics were provided by B.A. Robertson.

=== Original cast album ===
The original EFX cast album, featuring Michael Crawford, was released in 1995 on the Atlantic Theatre label, which was a division of the Atlantic label that Crawford held a record deal with at the time. To date, this version of the cast album is the only EFX cast album to receive a general release. Subsequent albums were only available through the EFX gift shop.

The recording features Michael Crawford on lead vocals. Jeffrey Polk, Kevin Koelbl, Rick Stockwell, and Stewart Daylida provide brief solo vocals on the track "Nexus", Ginny Grady duets with Crawford on the reprise of "The Magic That Surrounds You", and Tina Walsh provides vocals on the track "Tonight". The CD also features two instrumentals, "Morgana's Arrival" and "The Jig".

==== Track listing ====
1. Somewhere in Time
2. Nexus
3. EFX
4. The Magic That Surrounds You, Part 1
5. Merlin Ballet, Part 2
6. The Magic That Surrounds You (Reprise), Part 3
7. Morgana's Arrival
8. The Intergalactic Circus of Wonders
9. The Jig
10. Tonight
11. Counting Up to Twenty
12. Finale
13. Open Your Eyes

"Somewhere in Time" and "Open Your Eyes" were bonus tracks that were used as pre- and-post-show music, respectively, during Crawford's run in the show.

=== Crawford's departure ===
Due to the intensity of the stunts and the extreme physical demand required to perform the show, Michael Crawford sustained many serious physical injuries during his run in EFX, during both rehearsals and performances. Crawford, famous for his penchant to perform his own stunts, refused to use a stunt double (except for the end of the H.G. Wells act, in which a double was necessary due to a costume change). Many times, especially during early runs of EFX, Crawford took tumbles from scenery and zip-lines. Scenery would often fly out from under him (most notably the flying saucer) and either send him crashing to the stage or leave him dangling from a safety harness up to twelve feet in the air. One rehearsal of the Merlin act even resulted in his costume catching on fire, with half of it reportedly burned away before the flames could be extinguished. Crawford often took pain killers in order to perform every night, and some of the more demanding scenes were rewritten to accommodate performing around his injuries. In the end, a fall from a zip-line during the Barnum act required hospitalization and a hip replacement, causing Crawford to leave the show permanently in August 1996.

== Alternate version with understudy cast, 1996 ==
EFX continued without Michael Crawford and while David Cassidy was in rehearsals to take over. Most of the original cast remained with Kevin Koelbl playing the roles of the EFX Master and Harry Houdini in addition to the Master of Spirits, and Stewart Daylida taking on the additional roles of Merlin and P.T. Barnum while still playing the Master of Laughter. Tina Walsh remained to play Morgana and Bess Houdini, and Lisa Geist continued to play a young King Arthur to Ginny Grady's recorded vocals. Sheldon Craig replaced Jeffrey Polk as the Master of Magic, Saif Eddin took over Rick Stockwell's Master of Time, and Joe Machota was cast as (a much younger) H.G. Wells. In addition to the casting changes, there were also alterations made to the show itself. While it largely remained true to the original version, all of the lyrics for the Masters of Magic, Laughter, Spirit, and Time were rewritten, and some scenes were edited down. Barnum's entire stand-up routine was cut and replaced with a group ensemble number that featured a tumbling troupe and later, a flying trapeze act from Russia. Other changes included the addition of 1930s-style radio voice-over commentary (recorded by Stewart Daylida) that played during the Houdini scene, the editing down of the music in the finale, and cutting the pre- and-post-show music all together.

Around the second year of the show, two of the Masters left to pursue other jobs. Rick Stockwell was replaced as the Master of Time by Saif Eddin and Jeffrey Polk was replaced as the Master of Magic by Sheldon Craig. During the time Michael Crawford left the show, the four masters, who were the official understudies for the lead to be split into four acts took over for the first few days while it was being decided if Mr. Crawford would return. Kevin Koelbl (Master of Spirits) took over the opening and closing number, as well as for Houdini), Stewart Daylida (Master of Laughter) took over as Merlin, Sheldon Craig (Master of Magic) took over as P.T. Barnum and Saif Eddin took over the H.G. Wells role. Sheldon had already committed to do STARLIGHT EXPRESS after those 3 days so Stewart Daylida did double-duty as Merlin and P.T. Barnum. They performed as the leads for several more weeks (while some of the dancers doubled as the Masters, usually lip-synching to previously recorded tracks by the Masters). Saif Eddin had already left the show and his replacement as the Master of Time, Joe Mahoda, had learned the H.G. Wells part and went on but Stewart Daylida kept performing as P.T. Barnum instead of being replaced by Paul Finocchiaro since special material had been written to make that section work.

== David Cassidy version, 1996 ==
David Cassidy took over as headliner in November 1996, but only after he requested that he be given creative control. Dissatisfied with the show's original loose and free-flowing story line, Cassidy asked for a major overhaul. Bill Wray was brought in to refine and replace music, and writer David Chisholm and Cassidy's half-brother Shaun Cassidy were brought in to reconstruct the libretto (the book) together with Cassidy. The plot was rewritten and about half of the original songs were either cut or replaced.

=== Plot ===
The original plot from the 1995 production was rewritten by Chisholm and Shaun Cassidy under David Cassidy's supervision, and the music was profoundly changed by Bill Wray, who thought that the audience would better appreciate a more "coherent" story with a logical plot progression. The resulting book focused on David the bus boy, a character that it was felt the audience would identify with more, rather than an EFX Master who ruled a world of dreams. The darker, more serious themes of the show were also cut and replaced by more humorous elements, particularly those that poked fun at the Master of Time.

The show opens with the EFX Master (now a projection of James Earl Jones' face) instructing the Masters of Magic, Laughter, Spirit, and Time to find a human who has "lost their imagination" and bring them to EFX. The Masters discover David, a disenchanted bus boy who's serving drinks in the audience. David reveals that he's lost something in his life since losing his love Laura (an audience member selected by the cast before every performance). The Masters tell him that they'll help him regain that lost part of himself, and find Laura, if he's willing to go on a journey to do so. David agrees, and the Master of Magic turns him into King Arthur.

Merlin explains that magic is in nature and is accessible by everyone. Arthur is skeptical until Morgana arrives and engages Merlin in a wizard's duel. Just when it seems that Merlin is about to lose the battle, Arthur understands the lesson that the old wizard was trying to teach him, and pulls the sword from the stone to defeat Morgana. With his belief in the impossible and the power of imagination restored, David is sent on the next part of his journey.

David becomes P.T. Barnum, the ringmaster of the Intergalactic Circus of Wonders (whose theme song of the same name is now a rap performed by One Spirit). Barnum performs with the circus, and in the process, rediscovers his sense of humour and ability to have a good time. As the circus comes to an end, Barnum spots Laura in the audience, but she's whisked away before he can get to her. He has no choice but to continue on.

Wondering if Laura might be in the spirit world, David becomes Harry Houdini. He fails to find Laura, but Houdini and his wife Bess are briefly reunited and relive some of his greatest escapes before he has to perform one more daring feat: escaping from the spirit world before the Master of Spirits traps him there for all eternity. Houdini escapes, and now remembering what it's like to love, continues his quest for Laura.

The final part of David's journey requires him to travel through time. After having a humorous go at the light-hearted Master of Time, David becomes H.G. Wells and travels into the far distant future. Upon his arrival, he discovers that Laura has been kidnapped by the monstrous creatures known as the Morlocks, and is being held captive, along with other humans, in the Morlocks' caverns. Wells enlists the help of two slaves who managed to escape, and together, they defeat the Morlocks and free Laura and the others. Laura and Wells then return to the present time where the cast presents Laura, who is played by an audience member, with flowers for her participation in the show. David, now reunited with his long-lost love and filled with a new-found joy for life, reflects on his adventure and celebrates with the cast while encouraging the audience to embrace all the wonders life has to offer.

=== Casting ===
The casting of EFX also underwent changes. The EFX Master was cut almost completely. All that remained of the character was a giant projection of his face that appeared briefly at the beginning of the show. The Masters of Magic, Laughter, Spirit, and Time became the main characters of the world of EFX, and are responsible for leading the audience through the show. The lead role written for Cassidy was that of a bus boy who's brought into the world of EFX by the four Masters, and it's his story that the audience witnesses.

==== Cast ====
- David the bus boy, King Arthur, P.T. Barnum, Harry Houdini, and H.G. Wells: David Cassidy
- The EFX Master: James Earl Jones (pre-recorded voice only)
- The Master of Magic: Paul Finocchiaro
- Morgana: Amelia Prentice-Keene
- The Master of Laughter and Merlin: Stewart Daylida
- The Master of Spirits: Kevin Koelbl
- Bess Houdini: Satomi Hofmann
- The Master of Time: Paul May
- Laura: a randomly selected member of the audience

Former cast members Tina Walsh and Lisa Geist did not return for the 1997 version of the show. Geist's role as Young King Arthur was cut to allow Cassidy to play an older version of the character, while Walsh's roles as Morgana and Bess Houdini were divided and given to Amelia Prentice-Keene and Satomi Hofmann, respectively.

Other casting changes included bringing in Sal Salangsang to perform a thirty-minute comedic pre-show, and casting Paul May as not only the Master of Time, but the lead understudy to David Cassidy and the other three Masters.

=== Cast album ===
The David Cassidy version of the EFX cast album was released in 1997 by the MGM Grand and was available only through the EFX gift shop at the hotel. The musical theatre feel of the Michael Crawford cast album was replaced with a more pop/rock sound that was better suited to David Cassidy's musical style. The new music was written by Bill Wray, David Cassidy, Andrew Gold, Sue Shifrin, and One Spirit.

==== Track listing ====
1. Master's Theme
2. EFX
3. The Magic That Surrounds You, Part 1
4. The Intergalactic Circus of Wonders
5. The Greatest Showman in the Universe
6. The Jig
7. Tonight
8. River in Time
9. The Stick Dance
10. Break-Out
11. Finale Dance/The Big Beat
12. Let It Shine, Part 1
13. Let It Shine, Part 2

"Tonight" was cut from performances because Cassidy felt it was "too sad" for the audiences to handle. It was included on the cast album as a bonus track; however, it was erroneously labeled as having been "inspired by the Houdini Scene in EFX" instead of being credited as part of the original set list.

=== Differences between the 1995 and 1997 cast albums ===
- "Merlin Ballet", the reprise of "The Magic That Surrounds You", and the instrumental track "Morgana's Arrival" were omitted from the new recording.
- "Nexus" was replaced by the instrumental "Master's Theme", and H.G. Wells' song "Counting Up to Twenty" was replaced by "River in Time".
- The pre- and-post-show songs "Somewhere in Time" and "Open Your Eyes" were cut from the 1997 production. "Tonight" was also cut from performances, but is included as a bonus track on the 1997 album.
- Two numbers from the original 1995 production, "The Greatest Showman in the Universe" and "The Stick Dance", are included on the David Cassidy recording and are performed by the 1997 cast.
- Other new material added by Cassidy includes the songs "Break-Out" and parts one and two of "Let It Shine".
- Due to the character of the EFX Master being cut from the show, the title song is now performed by the Four Masters and David Cassidy.
- Two of the original songs were completely rewritten: "The Intergalactic Circus of Wonders" and the finale dance music. "Circus" became a rap performed by Cassidy and the group One Spirit, while the finale featured a more driving, percussion-heavy sound. These new versions are virtually unrecognizable from the originals.

=== Cassidy's departure ===
While most of the initial technical issues that plagued EFX's original run and forced Michael Crawford to leave his contract early had been ironed out by 1996, the show was still not without risk. The five-lead-roles-in-one were still highly physically demanding, causing frequent exhaustion, and multiple issues with trap-door exits not only aggravated pre-existing injuries, but resulted in new leg and back injuries for David Cassidy. As a result, Cassidy chose not to renew his contract, and in 1999, he left the show.

== Tommy Tune version, 1999 ==
The cast of EFX changed once again in 1999. The EFX Master was cut from the show completely, as was David Cassidy's character of Bus Boy. King Arthur was portrayed once again as a young boy, and the roles of Morgana and Bess Houdini were once more performed by the same actress.

Cast

- M.C., Merlin, P.T. Barnum, Harry Houdini, and H.G. Wells: Tommy Tune
- The Master of Magic: Michael Pointek
- Young King Arthur: Kristofer Saly
- Morgana and Bess Houdini: Tina Walsh
- The Master of Laughter: Stewart Daylida
- The Master of Spirits: Lawson Skala
- The Master of Time: Paul May

New additions to the cast included Ernest Chambers and Ken Young, who performed the song "River in Time", and dancer Andy Pellick. Original cast member Tina Walsh returned to reprise her roles as Morgana and Bess Houdini, and her re-casting led to the song "Tonight" being added back into the Houdini act of the show. Sal Salangsang stayed on to perform the pre-show, and at Tommy Tune's insistence, was formally recognized as a cast member during the curtain call. Paul May continued to understudy all the Masters, and co-starred with Andy Pellick as the understudy to Tommy Tune, Paul providing vocals and Andy dancing Tommy's choreography. Stewart Daylida was recognized as the only cast member to have performed in all three versions of EFX, having originated the role of the Master of Laughter and playing the character until the Masters were written out of the show by Rick Springfield in 2001.

=== Plot ===
Tommy Tune brought his own vision to EFX when he replaced David Cassidy in 1999. The show was once again rewritten, this time to better suit Tommy's performance style, most particularly his dancing. The 1999 plot was a somewhat more serious show than the David Cassidy version; however, it still retained some of the humor that had been introduced by Cassidy. There was also an emphasis on dreams, with the line "Wake up and dream!" becoming the unofficial slogan.

=== Cast album ===
The Tommy Tune version of the EFX original cast album was released in 1999 by the MGM Grand and, like its predecessor, was available only through the hotel gift shop. More changes were made to the music to accommodate the changes in the script, and several new songs by Bill Wray were added, heightening the emotional impact of the album.

==== Track listing ====
1. Prologue
2. In Dreams
3. What a Night
4. EFX (Bring on the Dream)
5. When You Believe (Lullaby)
6. Merlin Ballet
7. Greatest Showman
8. Intergalactic Circus of Wonders
9. The Jig
10. Eclipse
11. Tonight Duet
12. River in Time
13. The EFX Masters
14. Apotheosis (Finale Dance)
15. Let It Shine (Part One)
16. The Wedge
17. Song and Dance Man
18. Let It Shine (Part Two)
19. The Curtain Call

The packaging of the 1999 cast recording contained an error on the track list: "The Wedge" and "Song and Dance Man" were reversed; track 16 is "Song and Dance Man" and track 17 is "The Wedge".

=== Differences between the 1997 and 1999 cast albums ===
- "Master's Theme" was replaced by "Prologue", "In Dreams", and "What a Night".
- The title song was rewritten as "EFX (Bring on the Dream)", and the original music and lyrics of the theme became "The EFX Masters", a reflective piece similar to the opening of the Michael Crawford finale, that segues into the finale dance.
- "The Magic That Surrounds You" was replaced by "When You Believe (Lullaby)".
- "Greatest Showman in the Universe" was lengthened and is now performed before "The Intergalactic Circus of Wonders".
- A new instrumental, "Eclipse", was added to the Houdini scene.
- "The Stick Dance" is not featured on the 1999 cast album.
- "River in Time" is no longer performed by the lead character.
- The finale dance music was once again rewritten.
- Two new songs, "Song and Dance Man" and "The Wedge", were added between parts one and two of "Let It Shine".
- A live recording of the curtain call was included.

=== Tune's departure ===
Tommy Tune originally signed a one-year contract to appear in EFX. At the end of his run in 1999, he extended his contract for another six months before leaving in mid-2000.

== Rick Springfield version, 2001 ==
Rick Springfield took over for Tommy Tune, completely revamping the show and debuting his version in 2001. EFX, now retitled EFX Alive!, became more of a "theatrical concert production" as opposed to being an actual musical.

The Masters were written out of the show, along with scenes that featured dancer Andy Pellick and the Flying Kaganovich, a trapeze troupe that had joined the Barnum ensemble in 1996. Sal Salangsang's role was said to have been expanded, though no further details were given. Paul May and Kevan Patriquin shared the role of lead understudy to Rick Springfield. Paul stayed on as a lead understudy until he left the production for other projects a few months into Springfield's run. Paul's understudy duties were subsequently given to Salangsang.

=== Other differences between Tommy Tune's and Rick Springfield's version ===
- A new prologue was written to fit Rick's role as the EFX Master.
- "EFX (Bring on the Dream)" was replaced by "Rhythm of the Beat"
- "The Magic That Surrounds You" returns to the Merlin segment.
- "Greatest Showman in the Universe" is now performed after "The Intergalactic Circus of Wonders" in the P.T. Barnum segment.
- The Flying Kaganovich was replaced by an aerial sphere troupe.
- "Tonight" was replaced by "Forever" in the Houdini segment.

As with Tommy Tune, Rick Springfield initially signed a one-year contract. Despite becoming the newest victim in EFX's long history of performance-related accidents, fracturing his arm and spraining his wrist early on in his run, Springfield renewed his full contract and stayed with the show until it closed permanently on December 31, 2002.

The final performances of EFX Alive! were shot with several cameras. The result was a complete DVD video of EFX Alive! (compiling footage from multiple performances) released exclusively by Springfield's Gomer Records as part of a three-disc limited edition of his 2005 studio album, The Day After Yesterday and available only through the official Rick Springfield merchandise site. An original cast album of the Springfield version of EFX was not released.

You have to have a certain style of show here. When half your audience doesn't speak English, you have to be very visual.

— Michael Crawford, Time magazine
