= Dreams Are Nuthin' More Than Wishes =

Studio album by David Cassidy
- Released: October 1973
- Genre: Pop
- Label: Bell
- Producer: Rick Jarrard

David Cassidy chronology
Rock Me Baby (1972)	Dreams Are Nuthin' More Than Wishes (1973)	Cassidy Live! (1974)

Dreams Are Nuthin' More Than Wishes is the third solo album by David Cassidy, released in 1973 via Bell Records and produced by Rick Jarrard. It contains some cover versions, including John Sebastian's "Daydream", Peggy Lee's "Fever" and Nilsson's "Puppy Song"—whose lyrics make up the album title. David Cassidy also did his version of the Partridge Family song, "Summer Days".

Unique to this album is the fold out cover and the hand-written cover notes by Cassidy commenting on why he chose each song. The album made number one on the UK Albums Chart in 1973 and the top 20 in Australia in 1974 during Cassidy's concert tour of the continent.

Described by Steve Warren in the Blaydon Courier as an "album to melt the icicles from any little girl's heart", he complimented the pacing of the song that allowed Cassidy to maximize his "charm".

== Track listing ==
Side One

1. "Intro" (Michael H. McDonald)
2. "Daydream" (John Sebastian)
3. "Sing Me" (Tony Romeo)
4. "Bali Ha'i" (Oscar Hammerstein II, Richard Rodgers)
5. "Mae" (Gary Montgomery)
6. "Fever" (Eddie Cooley, John Davenport)
7. "Summer Days" (Tony Romeo)

Side Two

1. "The Puppy Song" (Harry Nilsson)
2. "Daydreamer" (Terry Dempsey)
3. "Some Old Woman" (Shel Silverstein, Bob Gibson)
4. "Can't Go Home Again" (Dave Ellingson, David Cassidy, Kim Carnes)
5. "Preyin' on My Mind" (Dave Ellingson, David Cassidy, Kim Carnes)
6. "Hold on Me" (Michael H. McDonald)

== Personnel ==
Sourced from the original album liner notes

- David Cassidy - lead vocals, electric (6) and acoustic guitars (5)
- Michael H. McDonald - Wurlitzer electric piano (1, 3–5, 7–10, 13), backing vocals (13)
- Michael Omartian - grand piano (2, 3, 6–10, 12, 13), Wurlitzer electric piano (11)
- Al Casey - acoustic guitar (1, 8, 9, 11–13), ukulele (4)
- Louis Shelton - electric (7) and acoustic guitars (2, 3)
- James Burton - dobro (2), acoustic guitar (3, 7)
- Larry Carlton - electric guitar (4, 13)
- Richard Bennett - electric (6) and acoustic guitars (8, 10)
- Dave Ellingson - acoustic guitar (10)
- Hal Davis - acoustic guitar (11, 12)
- Larry Knechtel - harmonica (2), bass guitar (2, 3, 7)
- Emory Gordy Jr. - bass guitar (4–6, 8, 10, 13)
- Max Bennett - bass guitar (9, 11, 12)
- John Guerin - drums (2, 3, 7, 9, 11, 12)
- Ron Tutt - drums (4–6, 8, 10, 13)
- Milt Holland - percussion (2–4, 6–8, 11–13), congas (5, 9, 10)
- Victor Feldman - vibraphone (4–6, 10, 13)
- Bobbye Hall - congas (3, 7)
- Bonita Sumelab - backing vocals (2)
- Vincent Comonaconaluiye - backing vocals (4)
- Kim Carnes - backing vocals (12, 13)
- Unknown - recorder (9)
