= David Cassidy Part II – The Remix =

David Cassidy Part II - The Remix

Remix album by David Cassidy
- Released: February 27, 2007
- Genre: Dance, Club music
- Label: 180 Music
- Producer: Craig J

David Cassidy chronology
A Touch of Blue (2003)	David Cassidy Part II - The Remix (2007)

David Cassidy Part II – The Remix or Dance Party Remix is a dance album from former teen-idol David Cassidy. The album was released in 2007 and is a remixed collection of four of his Billboard singles and seven Partridge Family songs in a club music style (with three versions of Come On, Get Happy).

The different names attributed to the album is David Cassidy Part II - The Remix was released as a limited edition.

== Tracks ==
1. "Come On Get Happy"
2. "Come On Get Happy - "GoGo" Remix"
3. "I Think I Love You"
4. "I'll Meet You Halfway"
5. "I Can Feel Your Heartbeat"
6. "I Woke Up In Love This Morning"
7. "Point Me In The Direction Of Albuquerque"
8. "Echo Valley 2-6809"
9. "Rock Me Baby"
10. "Cherish"
11. "Could It Be Forever"
12. "Ricky's Tune"
13. "Come On Get Happy"

== Personnel ==
- David Cassidy (background vocals)
- Craig J (guitar, programming)
- Cuty Morrison (guitars)
- Robin Simone
- Melissa Pradun
- Joaquina Mitchell
- Beth Glick
- Anny Rusk (background vocals).
