= The Puppy Song =

Harry Nilsson song

"The Puppy Song" is a Harry Nilsson song that appeared on his album Harry released in August 1969. Nilsson originally wrote this song at Paul McCartney's request for Mary Hopkin, an 18-year-old singer that McCartney had signed to Apple Records and whose debut album, Post Card would feature her version of Nilsson's song. David Cassidy released his version as a double A-side single with "Daydreamer", which reached No. 1 on the UK Singles Chart in 1973.

== Background ==
In 1968, Nilsson went to London to meet with members of The Beatles after John Lennon named Nilsson as his favorite American artist with both Lennon and Paul McCartney naming him their favorite group, and they requested a session with him. While in London, McCartney asked Nilsson to write a song for Mary Hopkin, a request to which Nilsson complied, working out the song on the piano and recording a demo that night. The song was sent to McCartney who thought it "perfect" for Hopkin. Hopkin recorded the song for her debut album Post Card.

Nilsson recorded the song himself later in the year. Nilsson's version was a little slower than Hopkin's, and was sung in the key of C rather than G. It was included in his album Harry released in 1969, and it served as the B-side to Nilsson's single "Maybe" in the UK.

The song lyrics tell of a child longing for a puppy, and the opening lines of the song about dreams and wishes: "Dreams are nothin' more than wishes / And a wish is just a dream you wish to come true", became a theme for the album Harry.

== David Cassidy version ==
"The Puppy Song"

Single by David Cassidy

from the album Dreams Are Nuthin' More Than Wishes
- A-side: "Daydreamer"
- Released: 1973
- Genre: Pop
- Length: 2:44
- Label: Bell
- Songwriter: Harry Nilsson
- Producer: Rick Jarrard

The song was popularized by David Cassidy in his double A-side single "Daydreamer"/"The Puppy Song". The single was released by Bell Records, and Cassidy specially flew to London to promote the single. The song reached No. 1 on the UK Chart, staying there for three weeks in November 1973. The single was also among the ten biggest sellers of 1973. The opening line of "The Puppy Song" was used as the title of David Cassidy's 1973 album Dreams Are Nuthin' More Than Wishes, and both songs of the single appear on the album.

=== Track list ===
- Daydreamer (written by Terry Dempsey) (2:46)
- The Puppy Song (written by Harry Nilsson) (2:44)

=== Personnel ===
Sources from the original album liner notes

- David Cassidy - lead and backing vocals
- Michael McDonald - Wurlitzer electric piano
- Michael Omartian - tack piano
- Al Casey - acoustic guitar
- Richard Bennett - acoustic guitar
- Emory Gordy Jr. - bass guitar
- Ron Tutt - drums
- Milt Holland - percussion
- Unknown - backing vocals, clarinet, jaw harp

=== Charts ===
==== Weekly charts ====
Chart (1973)	Peak position
Australia (Australia)	10
UK Singles (Official Charts)	1

==== Year-end charts ====
Chart (1973)	Rank
UK (OCC)	11
Chart (1974)	Rank
Australia (Kent Music Report)	71

== Usage ==
- Nilsson's version was used in the soundtrack for the opening credits of Nora Ephron's 1998 film You've Got Mail.
- Appeared on an episode of The Great Space Coaster, sung by Danny.
- The song appeared at the end of the first episode of the FX series Wilfred.
