= Didn't You Used to Be... =

Studio album by David Cassidy
- Released: September 1992
- Recorded: February–June 1992
- Studio: Santa Monica Sound Recorders, Santa Monica, California
- Genre: Pop
- Label: Scotti Bros.
- Producer: Eric "E.T." Thorngren

David Cassidy chronology
David Cassidy (1990)	Didn't You Used to Be... (1992)	Old Trick New Dog (1998)

Professional ratings
Review scores
Source	Rating
AllMusic	2/5 stars

Didn't You Used to Be... is the ninth studio album by American singer David Cassidy, released in 1992 by Scotti Brothers Records, the only album Cassidy released on that label. Originally titled Didn't You Used to Be?, the album features ten tracks which are all written or co-written by Cassidy's wife, Sue Shifrin.

The track "I'll Never Stop Loving You" was recorded by Heart—titled "Never Stop Loving You"―and was included on the Japanese special edition bonus 3-inch CD of their 1990 red velvet Brigade box set. It was later released by the EMI Japan label for the Heart compilation Ballads: The Greatest Hits in 1997 and with the reissue in 2001. Cher had also recorded the song for her 1991 album Love Hurts.

== Track listing ==
All tracks composed by David Cassidy and Sue Shifrin, except where indicated.

1. "Raindrops" (Cassidy, Shifrin, Dee Clark) – 4:18
2. "For All the Lonely" – 5:05
3. "Treat Me Like You Used To" (Cassidy, Shifrin, Mark Spiro) – 3:50
4. "Somebody to Love" – 4:01
5. "I'll Never Stop Loving You" (Cassidy, Shifrin, John Wetton) – 4:12
6. "Soul Kiss" – 3:56
7. "Tell Me True" – 4:15
8. "Like Father, Like Son" (Cassidy, Shifrin, Steve Diamond) – 4:18
9. "It's Over" (Shifrin, Ken Gold) – 3:42
10. "One True Love" – 4:35

== Personnel ==
Adapted from the album's liner notes.

Musicians

- David Cassidy – lead vocals, backing vocals, guitar
- Bill Bergman – Tenor saxophone
- Chuckii Booker – synth bass
- Luis Conte – percussion
- Steve Diamond – drum & keyboard programming on "Like Father, Like Son"
- Dennis Farias – trumpet
- The First A.M.E. Church – choir on "One True Love"; choirmaster: Joe Westmoreland
- Denny Fongheiser – drums & percussion
- The Fungi Horns – horns on "Tell Me True" & "Treat Me Like You Used To"
- Vaughn Johnson – keyboards & drum programming
- Ron Komie – guitar
- Nick Lane – trombone
- Olivia McClurkin – backing vocals
- Dick McIlvery – organ
- Treana Morris – duet on "I'll Never Stop Loving You"
- Derek Nakamoto – strings & organ, Rhodes piano on "Raindrops"
- Scott Page – baritone saxophone
- Sue Shifrin – backing vocals
- Alfie Silas – backing vocals
- Rose Stone – backing vocals
- Kevin Wyatt – bass guitar

Technical

- Eric "E.T." Thorngren – producer, recording, mixing; assisted by Rob Seifert
- Recorded & mixed at Santa Monica Sound Recorders, Santa Monica, California
- Doug Haverty – art direction
- Command A Studios, Inc. – design
- Jeff Katz – photography
