= William Butler (sound designer) =

British/Canadian musician, composer and sound designer

William Henry Butler, also known as Billy Butler, is a British-Canadian musician, composer, sound designer, record producer and recording engineer. He is a recipient of several major music and sound production awards including an Emmy Award, two Leo Awards and a Juno Award.
