= Gettin' It in the Street =

Studio album by David Cassidy
- Released: November 1976
- Label: RCA
- Producer: David Cassidy, Gerry Beckley

David Cassidy chronology
Home Is Where the Heart Is (1976)	Gettin' It in the Street (1976)	Romance (1985)

Gettin' It in the Street is the sixth studio album by American singer and actor David Cassidy, and his third and final album released by RCA Records. This would also be the last album Cassidy released in the United States until 1990 (with the release of David Cassidy) and his last all new album until 1985 (with the release of Romance). Gettin' It in the Street was released in Germany and Japan in November 1976, but did not reach the album charts. The few copies that were pressed for the US were released in July 1979.

Rock musician Mick Ronson played lead guitar on the title track which was released as a single. It reached number 105 on the US Billboard "Bubbling Under" chart and climbed to number seven in the weekly Top 20 compiled by readers of the German teen magazine Bravo. The album was not an official release by the record company and original copies are very hard to find. RCA pressed copies for the US market in 1976 but it wasn't released. In 1979, the US copies began appearing in "cut-out" bins as a remaindered or deleted item. The album has since been released on CD, and some tracks from it are compiled on the 1996 collection, When I'm a Rock 'n' Roll Star.

The track "Cruise to Harlem" was co-written by former (founding) Beach Boys member, Brian Wilson, and America member, Gerry Beckley, the latter co-writing several of the other tracks as well as co-producing the album.

== Critical reception ==
Professional ratings
Review scores
Source	Rating
AllMusic	4/5 stars

In a review of Gettin' It in the Street for AllMusic, Stephen Thomas Erlewine wrote that "Despite its lack of success, or even exposure, [the album] is, by many measures, one of Cassidy's best records", describing it as "a lively, mildly adventurous collaboration" with producer Beckley. He concluded the review by stating that "it's a thoroughly enjoyable piece of mainstream mid-'70s pop."

== Track listing ==
1. "Gettin' It in the Street" (David Cassidy, Gerry Beckley)
2. "Cruise to Harlem" (Cassidy, Beckley, Brian Wilson)
3. "I'll Have to Go Away (Saying Goodbye)" (Renee Armand, Kerry Chater)
4. "The Story of Rock and Roll" (Harry Nilsson)
5. "I Never Saw You Coming" (Cassidy, Jay Gruska)
6. "Living a Lie" (Cassidy, Beckley)
7. "Rosa's Cantina" (Cassidy, Bryan Garofalo)
8. "Love, Love the Lady" (Cassidy, Beckley)
9. "Junked Heart Blues" (Cassidy)

== Personnel ==
Adapted from the liner notes of the 2012 CD release of the album.

Musicians

- David Cassidy – vocals, backing vocals, guitar, acoustic guitar, lead guitar, piano, electric piano
- Gerry Beckley – second lead vocal (tracks 6, 8), backing vocals, guitar, piano, percussion
- Bob Alcivar – horn & strings arrangement
- Bryan Garofalo – backing vocals, lead guitar, bass guitar
- Jay Gruska – backing vocals, acoustic guitar, electric piano, Moog, percussion
- David Kemper – drums, percussion
- LA Horns – horns (track 5); arranged by Clarence McDonald
- Jurarez Horns – horns (track 7); arranged by Bob Alcivar
- Mick Ronson – lead guitar
- Steve Ross – guitar, 12-string electric guitar, acoustic guitar
- Ernie Watts – saxophone

Technical

- David Cassidy – producer
- Gerry Beckley – producer
- Alan Abrahams – executive producer
- Richie Schmitt – engineer
- Acy Lehman – art direction
- Tim Bryant – album design
- Ron Slenzak – photography
- Henry Diltz – photography
