= Home Is Where the Heart Is (David Cassidy album) =

Studio album by David Cassidy
- Released: March 1976
- Studio: Caribou Ranch, Nederland, Colorado
- Label: RCA
- Producer: David Cassidy, Bruce Johnston

David Cassidy chronology
The Higher They Climb (1975)	Home Is Where the Heart Is (1976)	Gettin' It in the Street (1976)

Professional ratings
Review scores
Source	Rating
AllMusic	2/5 stars

Home Is Where the Heart Is is the fifth studio album by American singer and actor David Cassidy, and his second album released by RCA Records. It was released in 1976 and was produced by Cassidy and Beach Boys member Bruce Johnston. Although critically well received, the album did not chart in any country. It is noted in particular for Cassidy's recording of Paul McCartney's song "Tomorrow" which McCartney rated as taking the song to its ultimate potential.

The album includes vocals by the Beach Boys' Carl Wilson, The Hudson Brothers and a composing contribution from America member Gerry Beckley, who also sings. Some tracks from this album are compiled in the 1996 collection, When I'm a Rock 'n' Roll Star.

== Track listing ==
1. "On Fire" (David Cassidy, Bill House)
2. "Damned If This Ain't Love" (Cassidy)
3. "January" (David Paton)
4. "A Fool in Love" (Cassidy, House)
5. "Tomorrow" (Paul McCartney, Linda McCartney)
6. "Breakin' Down Again" (Cassidy, House)
7. "Run and Hide" (Cassidy, House)
8. "Take This Heart" (Cassidy, Gerry Beckley)
9. "Goodbye Blues" (Ronnie S. Wilkins)
10. "Half Past Your Bedtime" (Cassidy, Beckley, Ricky Fataar)

== Personnel ==
Adapted from the liner notes of the 2012 CD release of the album.

- David Cassidy – vocals, guitar, keyboards, percussion, producer
- Philip Austin – backing vocals
- Gerry Beckley – backing vocals
- Dewey Bunnell – backing vocals
- Jesse Ed Davis – guitar
- Henry Diltz – harmonica
- Ned Doheny – guitar
- Steve Douglas – saxophone
- King Errisson – percussion
- Cyrus Faryar – backing vocals
- Ricky Fataar – drums
- Richie Furay – backing vocals
- Bryan Garofalo – bass guitar
- Jim Gordon – drums
- Emory Gordy, Jr. – bass guitar
- Gloria Grinel – backing vocals
- Tom Hensley – keyboards
- Kenny Hinkle – backing vocals
- John Hobbs – keyboards, backing vocals
- Bill House – guitar, backing vocals
- Stan House – drums
- Steve House – backing vocals
- Bill Hudson – backing vocals
- Brett Hudson – backing vocals
- Mark Hudson – backing vocals
- Bruce Johnston – keyboards, backing vocals, producer
- Jon Joyce – backing vocals
- Howard Kaylan – backing vocals
- Jim Keltner – drums
- Danny Kortchmar – guitar
- Gary Mallaber – drums
- John Raines – percussion
- Harry Robinson – banjo
- Stephen Ross – keyboards
- Jimmi Seiter – percussion, backing vocals
- Leland Sklar – bass guitar
- Curtis Stone – bass guitar
- Trish Turner – backing vocals
- Ron Tutt – drums
- Mark Volman – backing vocals
- Willie Weeks – bass guitar
- Carl Wilson – backing vocals
