= The Higher They Climb =

Studio album by David Cassidy
- Released: July 1975
- Genre: Pop
- Label: RCA
- Producer: David Cassidy, Bruce Johnston

David Cassidy chronology
Greatest Hits (1974)	The Higher They Climb (1975)	Home Is Where the Heart Is (1976)

The Higher They Climb or The Higher They Climb, the Harder They Fall is the fourth studio album by American singer and actor David Cassidy, and his first of three albums released by RCA Records. It was released in 1975 and was produced by Cassidy and Beach Boys member Bruce Johnston.

The title of the album alludes to David Cassidy's one-time dominance of the pop charts as a teen-idol (see The Partridge Family) and the eventual drop of his superstar status. The album only reached the charts in the UK, where it peaked at number 22.

The album features the track "Darlin'", a song from Bruce Johnston's band, The Beach Boys. Cassidy's version reached #16 on the UK charts. It was a #1 hit in South Africa and was the 6th best selling single of the year in that country. Johnston also recruited Beach Boys singer, Carl Wilson; however, Wilson's vocals appeared on the Johnston-penned song, "I Write the Songs". "I Write the Songs" was a #11 hit in the UK for Cassidy and was later recorded by Barry Manilow, who made it a hit in the U.S.

Some tracks from this collection are compiled onto the 1996 release When I'm a Rock 'n' Roll Star.

The album also includes some of David Cassidy's own songwriting, including "When I'm a Rock 'N' Roll Star".

== Track listing ==
1. "When I'm a Rock 'N' Roll Star" (Cassidy)
2. "Be-Bop-A-Lula" (Bill Davis, Gene Vincent)
3. "I Write the Songs" (Bruce Johnston)
4. "This Could Be the Night" (Phil Spector, Harry Nilsson)
5. "Darlin'" (Brian Wilson, Mike Love)
6. "Get It Up for Love" (Ned Doheny)
7. "Fix of Your Love" (Cassidy, Dave Ellingson)
8. "Massacre at Park Bench" [Dialogue]
9. "Common Thief" (Bill House)
10. "Love in Bloom" (Cassidy, Richie Furay)
11. "When I'm a Rock 'N' Roll Star (Reprise)" (Cassidy)

== Personnel ==
- David Cassidy - guitar, percussion, keyboards, vocals
- Jesse Ed Davis - guitar
- Ned Doheny - guitar
- Danny Kortchmar - guitar
- Bill House - guitar, steel guitar, vocals
- Bryan Garofalo - bass guitar, guitar
- Leland Sklar - bass guitar
- Willie Weeks - bass guitar
- Emory Gordy Jr. - bass guitar
- Curtis Stone - bass guitar
- Harry Robinson - banjo
- Stephen Ross - keyboards
- Tom Hensley - keyboards
- Bruce Johnston - keyboards, vocals
- John Hobbs - keyboards, vocals
- Jim Keltner - drums
- Jim Gordon - drums
- Gary Mallaber - drums
- Ricky Fataar - drums
- Stan House - drums
- Ron Tutt - drums
- King Errisson - Percussion
- John Raines - percussion
- Jim Seiter - percussion, vocals
- Carl Wilson - vocals
- Richie Furay - vocals
- Cyrus Faryar - vocals
- Philip Austin - vocals
- Gerry Beckley - vocals
- Dewey Bunnell - vocals
- Gloria Grinel - vocals
- Kenny Hinkle - vocals
- Steve House - vocals
- Bill Hudson - vocals
- Brett Hudson - vocals
- Mark Hudson - vocals
- Jon Joyce - Vocals
- Trish Turner - vocals
- Howard Kaylan - vocals
- Mark Volman - vocals
- Henry Diltz - harmonica
- Steve Douglas - saxophone
- Quzaimi Nadzir - composer
