= EFX (album) =

Studio album by David Cassidy
- Released: 1997
- Label: MGM Grand Hotel Inc.

EFX was a musical album released of David Cassidy's version of the Las Vegas show, EFX. The album was released in 1997 and only made available on compact disc through the MGM Grand. Cassidy was the headline performer for EFX for two years.

During his tenure as a headliner of EFX, Cassidy wrote and recorded the song, Intergalactic Circus of Wonder.

== Track listing ==
1. Master's Theme
2. EFX
3. The Magic That Surrounds You
4. Intergalactic Circus of Wonder (David Cassidy)
5. The Greatest Showman in the Universe
6. The Jig
7. Tonight
8. River in Time
9. Stick Dance
10. Break-out
11. Finale Dance- the BIG beat
12. Let It Shine - Part I
13. Let It Shine - Part
