= David Cassidy (album) =

Studio album by David Cassidy
- Released: August 1990
- Genre: Pop rock
- Label: Enigma
- Producer: E.T. Thorngren, Phil Ramone, Carter, Mark "Clams" Casino, Rick Neigher

David Cassidy chronology
Romance (1985)	David Cassidy (1990)	Didn't You Used to Be... (1992)

David Cassidy is David Cassidy's first U.S. album released in 14 years and was his only release on the now-defunct Enigma Records. The album was released in 1990 with the featured single, "Lyin' to Myself." "Lyin' to Myself" was the first top-30 hit for David Cassidy in eighteen years. The single featured "I'll Believe You Again", written by Cassidy and Sue Shifrin on the b side; a track which is not featured on the album. The album reached 136 on the Billboard charts.

David Cassidy was released only on cassette or compact disc in the United States, although vinyl editions were available in Europe.

Shortly after the release of David Cassidy, Enigma Records would go bust, leaving David Cassidy to once again change record labels.

== 1990 Tour ==
David Cassidy performed a series of concerts including an SRO gig in Toronto in 1990 to support the album; his warm-up act was a stand-up comedy routine by Danny Bonaduce, his old Partridge Family co-star. Bonaduce credits David Cassidy for helping him out of one (of his many) dark times by inviting him on the tour.

== Promotional videos ==
A music video was produced and released for the single "Lyin' to Myself". The video features David waiting in the terminal of New York's Grand Central Station.

== Track listing ==
1. "Labor of Love" (David Cassidy, Sue Shifrin, Michael Dan Ehmig)
2. "You Remember Me" (David Cassidy, Sue Shifrin, Michael Dan Ehmig)
3. "Lyin' to Myself" (David Cassidy, Sue Shifrin)
4. "Boulevard of Broken Dreams" (David Cassidy, Sue Shifrin)
5. "Hi-Heel Sneakers" (Robert Higgenbotham)
6. "Message to the World" (David Cassidy, Sue Shifrin)
7. "Living Without You" (David Cassidy, Sue Shifrin, Rick Neigher)
8. "Stranger in Your Heart" (David Cassidy, Mark Spiro, Mike Reno)
9. "Prisoner" (David Cassidy, Sue Shifrin, John Wetton)
10. "All Because of You" (Sue Shifrin, Jon Lind) - duet with Sue Shifrin

The album was released in North America on Compact Disc and Cassette, however a few European markets did release it on vinyl such as Holland, Italy and Germany

== Personnel ==
- David Cassidy - Vocals, guitar

Special Guests:

- Michael Thompson - Guitar
- Michael Landau - Guitar
- Ron Komie - Guitar
- Jeff "Skunk" Baxter - Guitar
- Tim McGovern - Guitar
- Jeff Silverman - Guitar
- Paca Thomas - Keyboards
- Kevin Savigar - Keyboards
- Charles Judge - Keyboards
- Mark Spiro - Keyboards, backing vocals
- C.J. Vanston - Keyboards
- Ralph Carter - Bass
- Bradford Cobb - Bass
- Brad Cummings - Bass
- John Pierce - Bass
- Jim Hines - Drums
- Jack White - Drums
- Myron Grumbacher - Drums
- Denny Fongheiser - Drums
- Tim McGovern - Drums
- Sue Shifrin - Backing vocals
- Mark Free - Backing vocals
- Rick Neigher - Backing vocals
- Freddy Curci - Backing vocals
- Michael Dan Ehmig - Backing vocals
- Joe Turano - Backing vocals
