= I Guess the Lord Must Be in New York City =

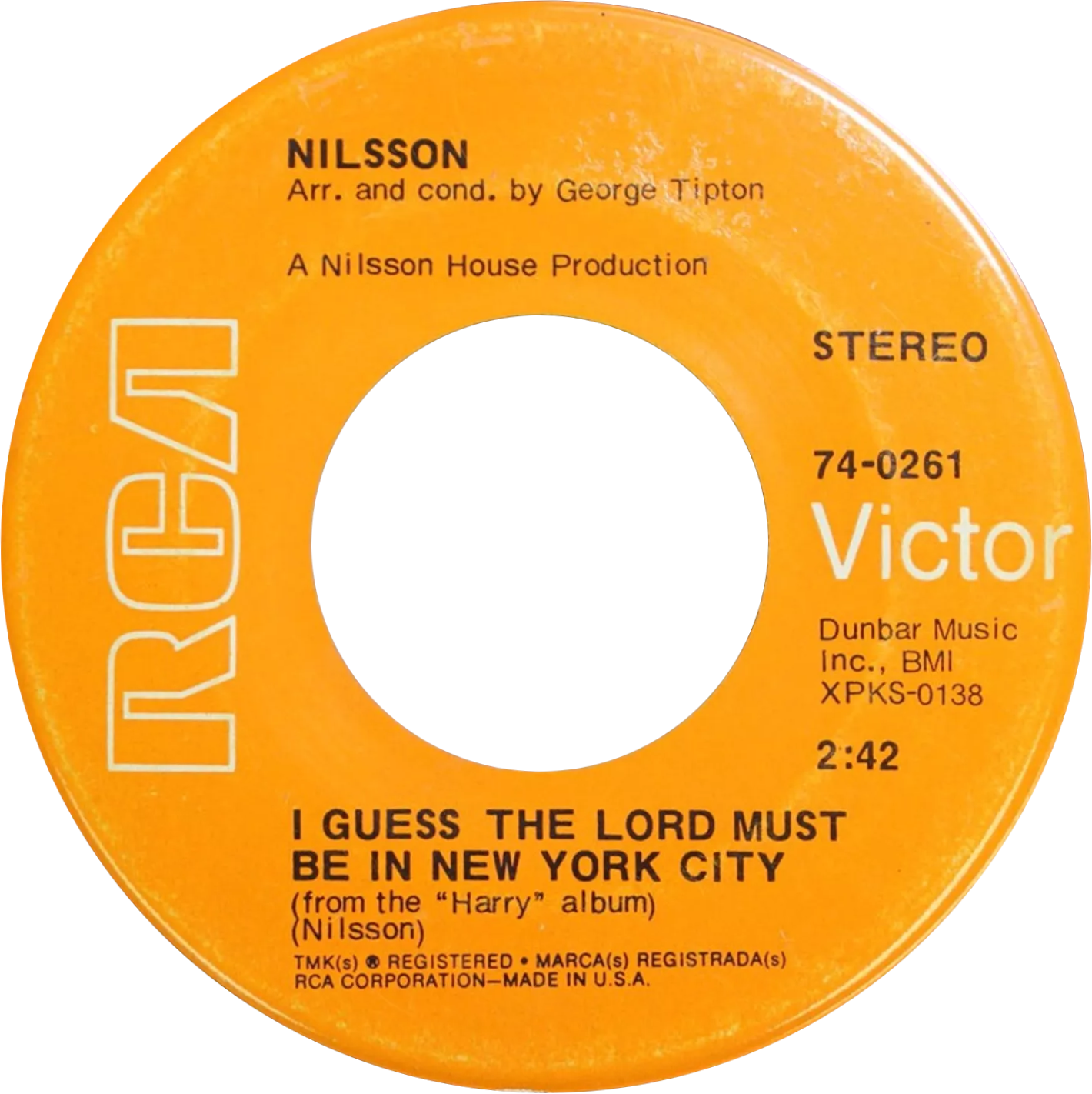
- Side A of the US single

Single by Nilsson

from the album Harry
- B-side: "Maybe" (U.S.); "Rainmaker" (Intl.)
- Released: October 1969
- Genre: Folk rock
- Label: RCA Victor
- Songwriter: Harry Nilsson
- Producer: Rick Jarrard

Nilsson singles chronology
| "Everybody's Talkin'" (1969) | "I Guess the Lord Must Be in New York City" (1969) | "Waiting" (1970) |

"I Guess the Lord Must Be in New York City" is a song written and recorded by singer-songwriter Nilsson in 1969. A track from his fourth studio album, Harry, it became his second charting single.

== Background ==
The song was written for, but not included in, the movie Midnight Cowboy. The same recording was reissued in 1972 crediting Buck Earl (Jon Voight's character in the movie was Joe Buck) as the performing artist.

== Chart performance ==
It became Nilsson's second hit record in the U.S., reaching No. 34 on the Billboard Hot 100 chart and No. 7 on the Easy Listening chart.

The song was a bigger hit in Canada, where it reached No. 25 on the Pop chart and No. 3 on the Adult Contemporary chart.

| Chart (1969–1970) | Peak position |
|---|---|
| Australian Singles Chart | 66 |
| Canada RPM Top Singles | 25 |
| Canada RPM Adult Contemporary | 3 |
| New Zealand (Listener) | 23 |
| U.S. Billboard Hot 100 | 34 |
| U.S. Billboard Easy Listening | 7 |
| U.S. Cash Box Top 100 | 35 |

== Notable cover versions ==
- "I Guess the Lord Must Be in New York City" was recorded by Sagittarius in 1969. It reached No. 135 on the U.S. Billboard Bubbling Under the Hot 100 chart.
- A rendition by Wayne Newton reached No. 28 on the US Easy Listening chart in the fall of 1969.

== Popular culture ==
- The track was used in a film – 1971's La Mortadella (US title: Lady Liberty), starring Sophia Loren.
- Both the original track and a cover by Sinéad O'Connor were featured in the 1998 movie You've Got Mail starring Tom Hanks and Meg Ryan.
- The song was featured in the 2009 Off-Broadway and 2010 Broadway musical "Everyday Rapture", a semi-autobiographical musical about (and starring) Sherie Rene Scott.
- Nilsson's recording was also featured in the 2025 film Materialists by director Celine Song.
