= Daydreamer (David Cassidy song) =

Single by David Cassidy

from the album Dreams Are Nuthin' More Than Wishes
- A-side: "The Puppy Song"
- Released: 1973
- Genre: Pop
- Length: 2:47
- Label: Bell
- Songwriter: Terry Dempsey
- Producer: Rick Jarrard

"Daydreamer" is a song by the American singer David Cassidy.

Written by Terry Dempsey and produced by Rick Jarrard, "Daydreamer" was Cassidy's second and final No.1 single in the UK Singles Chart, spending three weeks at the top of the chart in October and November 1973. The song was a double-A side with a cover version of Harry Nilsson's "The Puppy Song". The single was the 10th best selling single in the UK in 1973.

The song also appears on David Cassidy's 1973 UK No.1 album Dreams Are Nuthin' More Than Wishes.

Cilla Black recorded a version of this song in 1974. That same year, the French singer Claude François also recorded an adaptation of this song called "Le mal aimé" (The poorly loved one) which was a hit in France and Belgium. François's cover gained renewed international attention in late 2025 after being featured in a computer-animated Christmas commercial, produced by the advertising agency Romance for the French supermarket chain Intermarché, showing the story of a lone wolf cooking a vegetarian dish in the hopes of befriending other forest animals who fear him as a carnivore. The commercial received praise, especially since no artificial intelligence was used in the animation.

The song's only chart appearances in the US were by C.C. & Company and Gino Cunico in 1976. C.C. & Company’s soul-flavored version (produced by Mike Theodore and Dennis Coffey) entered the Hot 100 on January 3, 1976, and made it to #91 six weeks later. Cunico’s cover, on Arista Records, which hit No. 43 on the Billboard Easy Listening Chart, added a bridge repeating the phrase "ain't that a shame", echoing the lyrical variation introduced by Cilla Black in her 1974 treatment of the song.

== Personnel ==
Sourced from the original album liner notes

- David Cassidy - lead and backing vocals
- Michael McDonald - Wurlitzer electric piano
- Michael Omartian - grand piano
- Al Casey - acoustic guitar
- Max Bennett - bass guitar
- John Guerin - drums
- Milt Holland - congas
- Unknown - recorder

== Chart history ==
=== Weekly charts ===
David Cassidy

Chart (1973–1974)	Peak position
Australia (Kent Music Report)	10
Germany (GfK)	27
Ireland (IRMA)	3
South Africa (Springbok)	3
UK Singles (OCC)	1

=== Year-end charts ===
Chart (1973)	Rank
UK	11

Chart (1974)	Rank
Australia (Kent Music Report)	71

C.C. & Company

Chart (1975–1976)	Peak position
US Billboard Hot 100	91

Gino Cunico

Chart (1976)	Peak position
US Billboard Easy Listening	43
