= David Cassidy =

American actor and musician (1950–2017)

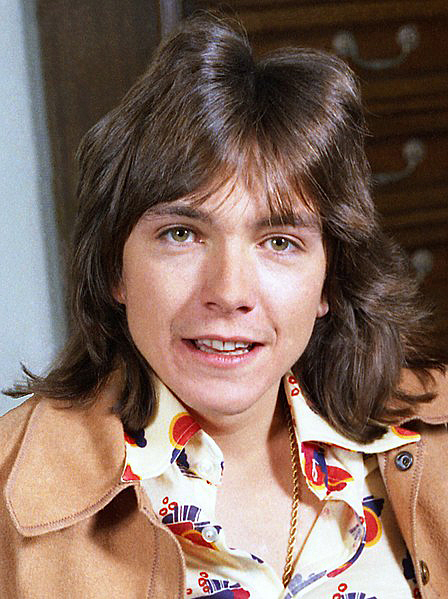
- Cassidy in 1972
- Born: David Bruce Cassidy; April 12, 1950; New York City, U.S.
- Died: November 21, 2017 (aged 67); Fort Lauderdale, Florida, U.S.
- Occupations: Actor; singer; songwriter
- Years active: 1968–2017
- Spouses: Kay Lenz (m. 1977; div. 1983); Meryl Tanz (m. 1984; div. 1987); Sue Shifrin (m. 1991; div. 2016)
- Children: 2, including Katie
- Parents: Jack Cassidy; Evelyn Ward
- Family: Shirley Jones (stepmother); Elliot Silverstein (stepfather); Shaun Cassidy (half-brother); Patrick Cassidy (half-brother); Ryan Cassidy (half-brother)
- Musical career
- Genres: Pop; rock
- Instruments: Vocals; guitar; piano; drums
- Labels: Bell; Curb; Arista; Enigma; RCA; Slamajama; Scotti Bros.; Starblend; Universal Music
- Formerly of: The Partridge Family
- Website: davidcassidy.com

David Bruce Cassidy (April 12, 1950 – November 21, 2017) was an American actor and musician. While he was best known in the United States for his role as Keith Partridge in the 1970s musical-sitcom The Partridge Family, he was an international success in his solo career as a singer. For a period, he was the highest-paid entertainer in the world.

After completing high school, Cassidy pursued acting and music. His career took off after he signed with Universal Studios in 1969, and he received roles in several TV series. Cassidy's major breakthrough came in 1970 with his portrayal of Keith Partridge on The Partridge Family, which brought him stardom and made him a 1970s teen idol. Cassidy also pursued a solo music career that led to international acclaim; his hit singles included "Cherish" and "How Can I Be Sure". Cassidy also acted in film, on television, and in musical theater.

== Early life ==
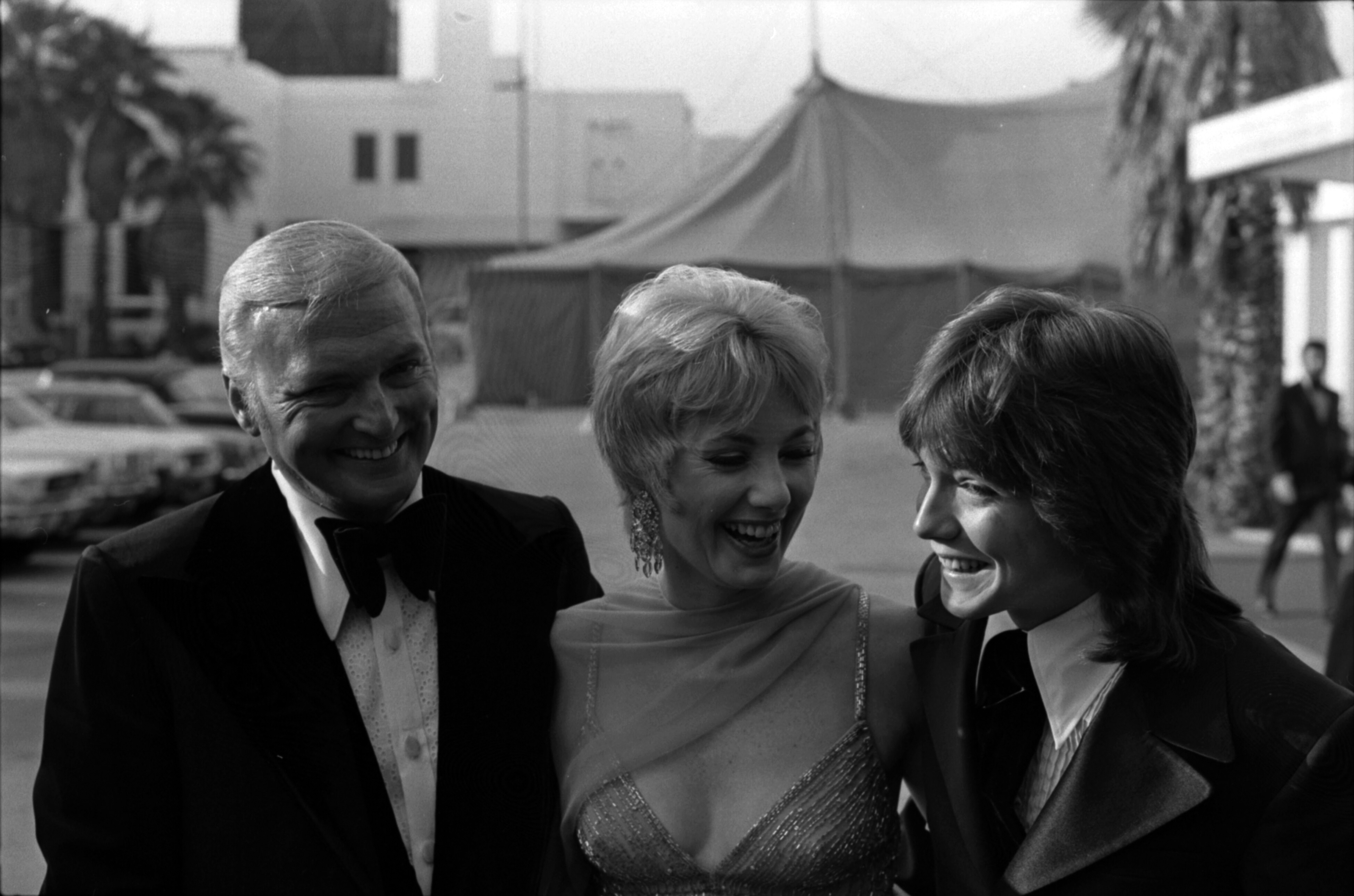
Cassidy (right) with his father, actor Jack Cassidy (left), and his stepmother, Shirley Jones (center), in 1971

David Bruce Cassidy was born at Flower Fifth Avenue Hospital in New York City, the son of singer and actor Jack Cassidy and actress Evelyn Ward. His father was of half Irish and half German ancestry, and his mother was descended mostly from Colonial British Americans, along with having some Irish and Swiss roots. His mother's ancestors were among the founders of Newark, New Jersey.

As his parents were frequently touring 'on the road,' Cassidy was raised in his early years by his maternal grandparents Frederick and Ethel Ward. They lived in a middle-class neighborhood in West Orange, New Jersey. In 1958, he learned from neighbor children that his parents had been divorced for more than two years and had not told him.

In 1956, Cassidy's father had married singer and actress Shirley Jones. They had three children together. David's half-brothers are Shaun (b. 1958), Patrick (b. 1962), and Ryan (b. 1966).

In 1968, after completing one final session of summer school to obtain credits necessary to get a high school diploma, David moved in with his father and Shirley Jones, and their three sons, in their home in Irvington, New York. Cassidy lived there, seeking work as an actor/musician, while simultaneously working half-days in the mailroom of a textile firm. He moved out when his career began to flourish.

Cassidy's father, Jack, is credited with setting his son up with his first manager. After David Cassidy signed with Universal Studios in 1969, Jack introduced him to former table tennis champion and close friend Ruth Aarons, who had a theater background and had found her niche as a talent manager. Aarons had represented Jack and Shirley Jones for several years and later also represented Cassidy's half-brother Shaun.

Aarons became an authority figure and close friend to Cassidy and he credits her as the driving force behind his on-screen success. After Cassidy made small wages from Screen Gems for his work on The Partridge Family during season one, when it became a great success, Aarons discovered that he had been underage when he signed his contract. She renegotiated the contract with far superior provisions and a rare four-year term.

== Career ==
=== 1960s ===
On January 2, 1969, Cassidy made his professional debut in the Broadway musical The Fig Leaves Are Falling. It closed after four performances, but a casting director saw the show and asked Cassidy to make a screen test. In 1969, he moved to Los Angeles. After signing with Universal Studios in 1969, Cassidy was featured in episodes of the television series Ironside, Marcus Welby, M.D., Adam-12, Medical Center, and Bonanza.

=== 1970s ===
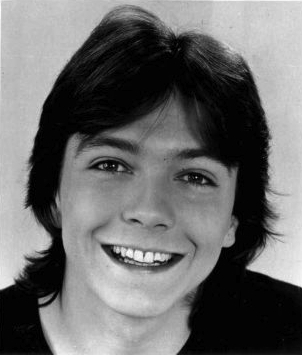
Cassidy in a publicity photo for The Partridge Family, 1970

In 1970, Cassidy took the role of Keith Partridge on the musical television show The Partridge Family produced by Screen Gems. After demonstrating his singing talent, Cassidy was allowed to join the studio ensemble as the lead singer. (He and his stepmother Shirley Jones, who portrayed his on-screen mother Shirley Partridge, were the only TV cast members to perform on any Partridge Family recordings.)

Cassidy's work on The Partridge Family made him a teen idol, but stardom took a toll on him. In the midst of his rise to fame, Cassidy felt stifled by the show and trapped by the constant attention surrounding his every move. In May 1972, to alter his public image, he appeared on the cover of Rolling Stone in a revealing photo by Annie Leibovitz.The accompanying Rolling Stone article mentioned that Cassidy was riding around New York in the back of a car "stoned and drunk."

Once "I Think I Love You"—the first single released by The Partridge Family pop group—became a hit, Cassidy began work on solo albums. These included Cherish and Rock Me Baby, both released in 1972. Within the first year, he had produced his own single, a cover of The Association's "Cherish" (from the album of the same title); the song reached number nine on the Billboard Hot 100 in the United States, number two in the United Kingdom (a double A-side with "Could It Be Forever"), and number one in Australia and New Zealand. He began tours that featured The Partridge Family tunes and his own hits.

Cassidy achieved far greater solo chart success in the UK than in his native America, including a UK #1 cover of The Young Rascals' "How Can I Be Sure" and the double A-side single "Daydreamer" / "The Puppy Song" – a UK number one which failed to chart in the States. In Britain, Cassidy the solo star remains best known for "Daydreamer", "How Can I Be Sure", and "Could It Be Forever" (UK number 2/US number 37), all released during his 1971–75 solo chart peak.

After launching his solo musical career, he was for a short time the highest paid entertainer in the world. At the peak of his career, Cassidy's fan club was larger than that of any other musical group or pop star, including The Beatles or Elvis Presley. A fictionalized version of him starred in the fan magazine David Cassidy. Many of its issues were signed by Turkish comics creator Su Gumen.

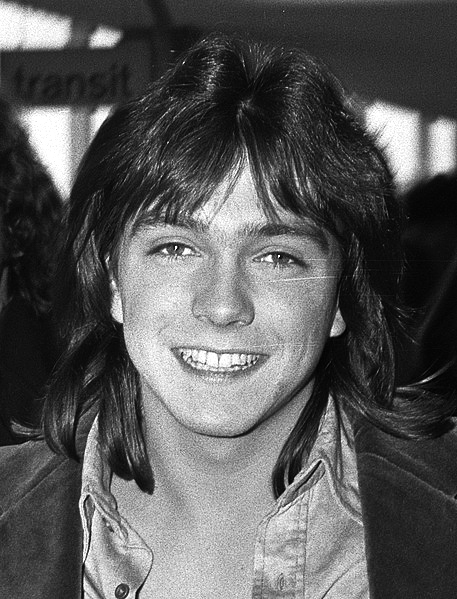
Cassidy in 1973

In a 1993 interview, Cassidy said that he was frustrated by his portrayal in the magazines, which sanitized his image. His fan club nicknamed a star after him in the International Star Registry in 1983. In his autobiography, Cassidy said that he felt overwhelmed by his fanbase, and said that "it became impossible for me to go in a store or even walk down the street without being stopped by people." Cassidy was best known for his work on The Partridge Family, which aired until March 1974. Though he wanted to become a respected rock musician along the lines of Mick Jagger, his channel to stardom launched him into the ranks of teen idol, a brand he loathed until much later in life when he came to terms with his pop idol beginnings. Ten albums by The Partridge Family and five solo albums by Cassidy were produced during the series, with most selling more than a million copies each.

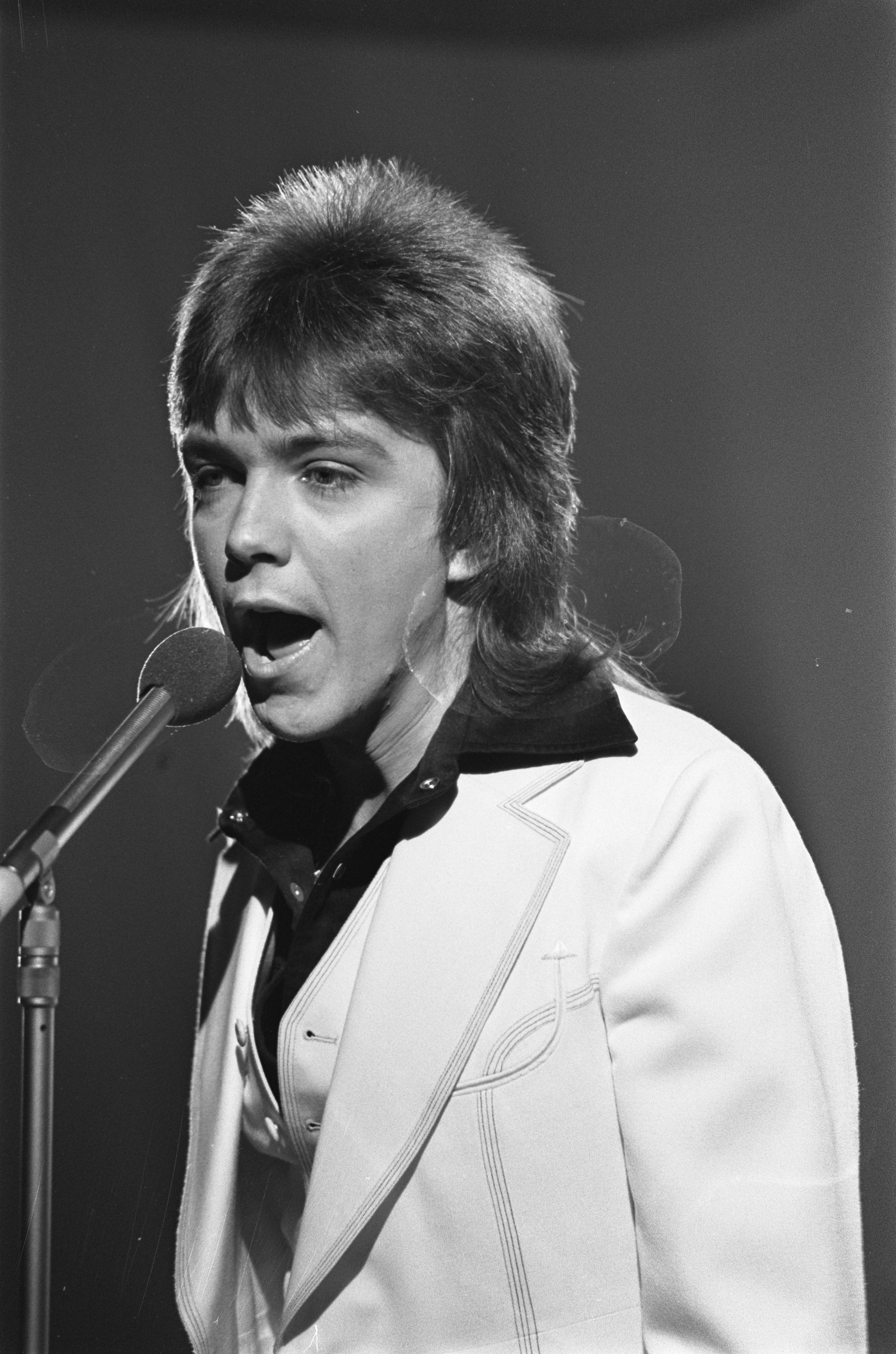
Cassidy performing in 1975

Internationally, Cassidy's solo career eclipsed the phenomenal success of The Partridge Family. He became an instant drawing card, with sellout concert successes at major arenas. These concerts produced mass hysteria, resulting in the media coining the term "Cassidymania". For example, he played to two sellout crowds of 56,000 each at the Houston Astrodome in Texas over one weekend in 1972. His concert in New York's Madison Square Garden sold out in one day and was followed by riots after the show. His concert tours of the United Kingdom included sellout concerts at Wembley Arena in 1973. In Australia in 1974, the mass hysteria was such that calls were made to have him deported from the country, especially after the madness at his 33,000-person audience concert at Melbourne Cricket Ground.

A turning point in Cassidy's career occurred at the penultimate show on a world tour in London's White City Stadium on May 26, 1974. On that date, nearly 800 people were injured in a stampede at the front of the stage. Thirty were taken to the hospital, and a 14-year-old girl, Bernadette Whelan, died four days later at London's Hammersmith Hospital without regaining consciousness. A deeply affected Cassidy faced the press, trying to make sense of what had happened. Out of respect for the family and to avoid turning Whelan's funeral into a media circus, Cassidy did not attend the service. He spoke privately to Whelan's parents and sent flowers. Cassidy stated at the time that the girl's death would haunt him until the day he died.

I'm exploited by people who put me on the back of cereal boxes. I asked my housekeeper to go and buy a certain kind of cereal and when she came home, there was a huge picture of me on the back. I can't even eat breakfast without seeing my face. —New Musical Express, October 1972.

By this point, Cassidy had decided to quit touring, concentrating instead on recording and songwriting. International success continued, mostly in Great Britain, Germany, Japan and South Africa, when he released three well-received solo albums and several hit singles on RCA in 1975 and 1976. Cassidy became the first recording artist to have a hit with "I Write the Songs", peaking at No. 11 in the Top 30 in Great Britain before the song became known as Barry Manilow's signature tune. Cassidy co-produced the recording with the song's author-composer, Bruce Johnston of The Beach Boys. The two artists collaborated on two of Cassidy's mid-70s RCA Records albums The Higher They Climb and Home Is Where the Heart Is.

In 1978, Cassidy starred in an episode of Police Story titled "A Chance to Live", for which he was nominated for a Primetime Emmy Award for Outstanding Guest Actor in a Drama Series at the 30th Primetime Emmy Awards. NBC created a series based on it, called David Cassidy: Man Undercover, but it was cancelled after one season.

=== 1980s ===
Cassidy later said that he was broke by the 1980s, despite being successful and highly paid. In 1985, music success continued with the Arista release of the single "The Last Kiss" (number six in the United Kingdom), with backing vocals by George Michael, which was included on the album Romance. These went gold in Europe and Australia, and Cassidy supported them with a sellout tour of the United Kingdom, which resulted in the Greatest Hits Live compilation of 1986. Michael cited Cassidy as a major career influence and interviewed Cassidy for David Litchfield's Ritz Newspaper.

Cassidy performed in musical theater. In 1981, he toured in a revival of a pre-Broadway production of Little Johnny Jones, a show originally produced in 1904 with music, lyrics, and book by George M. Cohan. (The show is excerpted in the 1942 biographic film Yankee Doodle Dandy, when James Cagney as Cohan sings "Give My Regards to Broadway" and "The Yankee Doodle Boy".) However, Cassidy received negative reviews, and he was replaced by another former teen idol, Donny Osmond, before the show reached Broadway. Cassidy, in turn, replaced Doug Voet as the lead character Joseph in the original 1982 Broadway production of Joseph and the Amazing Technicolor Dreamcoat. Cassidy also appeared in London's West End production of Time and returned to Broadway in Blood Brothers alongside Petula Clark and his half-brother Shaun Cassidy.

=== 1990s ===
Cassidy returned to the American top 40 with his 1990 single "Lyin' to Myself", released on Enigma Records, from his 1990 album David Cassidy, followed by the 1992 album Didn't You Used to Be... on Scotti Brothers Records. In 1998, he had an adult contemporary music hit with "No Bridge I Wouldn't Cross" from his album Old Trick New Dog on his own Slamajamma Records label.

Along with Cassidy's single "Lyin' to Myself", 1990 was also the year he starred as the lead of the motion picture comedy, The Spirit of '76, where he played Adam-11, a man from the future who arrived in the US in the year 1976 on a mission to find the US Constitution. It was also the year he appeared as a main character in the romantic drama Instant Karma.

From November 1996 to December 1998, Cassidy starred in the Las Vegas show EFX at the MGM Grand Las Vegas.

=== Later career ===
In 2000, Cassidy wrote and appeared in the Las Vegas show At the Copa with Sheena Easton, as both the young and old versions of the lead character, Johnny Flamingo. His 2001 album Then and Now went platinum internationally and returned Cassidy to the top five of the UK album charts for the first time since 1974.

In 2005, Cassidy played Grant, the manager of Aaron Carter's character J.D. McQueen in the film Popstar. He co-starred alongside his half-brother Patrick in a short-lived 2009 ABC Family comedy series titled Ruby & the Rockits, a show created by their brother Shaun. Cassidy was one of the contestants on the fourth season of The Celebrity Apprentice in 2011.

As the days of "Cassidymania" subsided, Cassidy regularly addressed fans at his concerts in question-and-answer sessions. In August 2016, Cassidy performed in The Villages, Florida, and brought multiple attendees to the side of the stage, asking and answering questions and engaging with members of the community who had been fans for nearly half a century.

== Personal life ==
Cassidy moved to Fort Lauderdale, Florida, in 2002. He filed for bankruptcy in 2015.

=== Marriages and children ===
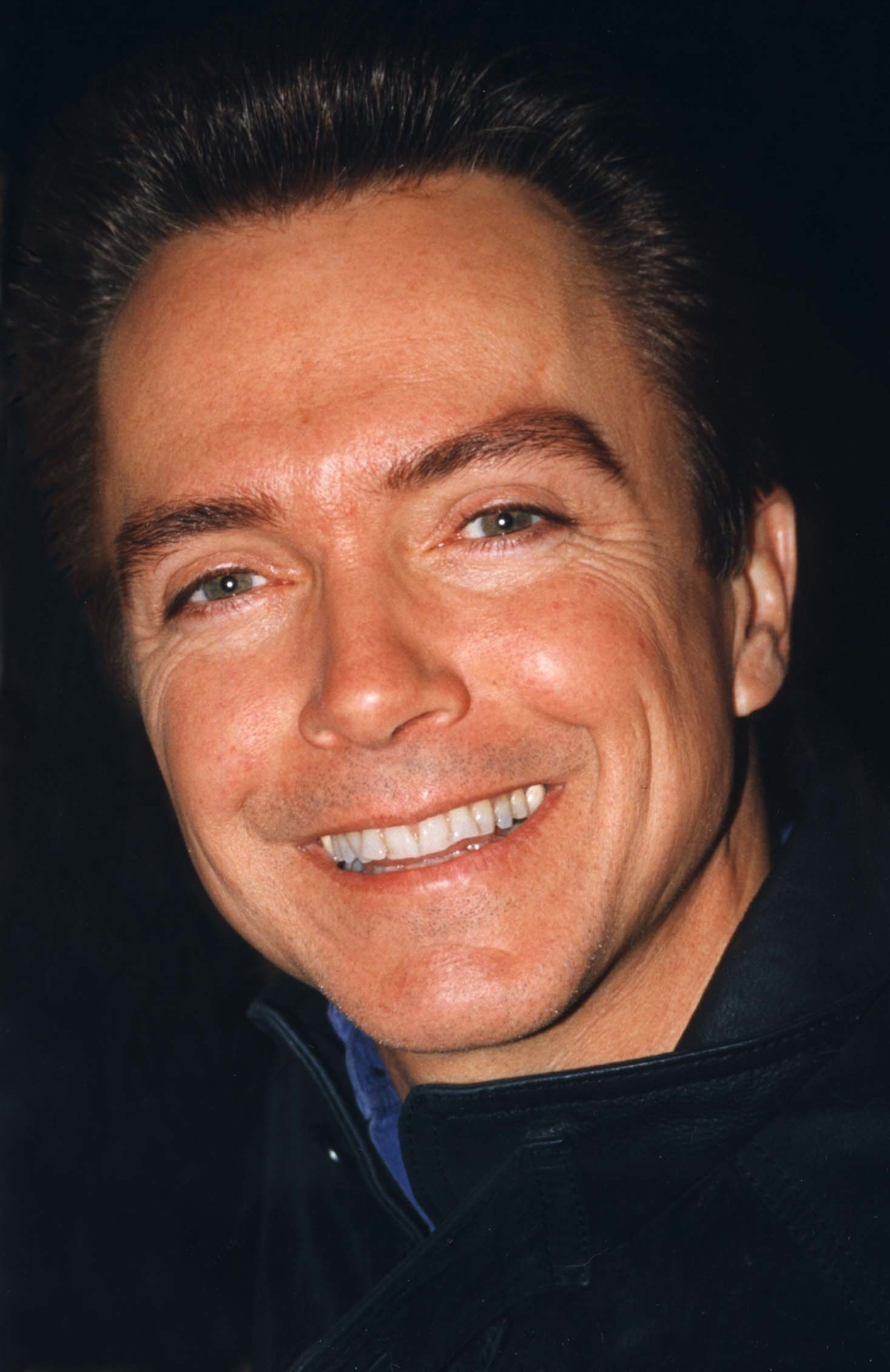
Cassidy in 1995

Cassidy's first wife was actress Kay Lenz, whom he married on April 3, 1977. They divorced on December 28, 1983.

Cassidy married again in 1984, to Meryl Tanz, a horse breeder. They met in 1974 at a horse sale in Lexington, Kentucky. This marriage ended in divorce in 1988.

Cassidy's daughter, actress Katie Cassidy, was born in 1986 from an extramarital affair with fashion model Sherry Williams. Katie was raised by her mother and her stepfather, Richard Benedon. In 2009, Cassidy noted, "Because I didn't raise her, I didn't have to parent her. I'm always here and totally nonjudgmental". Katie Cassidy added, "To be able to go to someone I'm genetically linked to, tell them anything and know that they're not going to judge me—it's unbelievable. It's nice when your dad can be your friend". While Cassidy was estranged from Katie as of February 2017, she was with him prior to his death in November 2017.

On March 30, 1991, Cassidy married songwriter Sue Shifrin. It was Cassidy's third marriage and Shifrin's second marriage. They had one child, singer-songwriter Beau Cassidy, in 1991. In August 2013, Cassidy's Los Angeles publicist confirmed that Cassidy and Shifrin had separated, with Shifrin filing for divorce in February 2014. The divorce was finalized on April 27, 2016.

=== Activism ===
In 2011, Cassidy recorded a public service announcement for Alzheimer's disease research and prevention. His mother, Evelyn Ward, suffered from the condition. Cassidy said that he would campaign for that cause whenever possible. He planned to address Congress on the issue in 2012.

Cassidy was a long-time registered Democrat. During a 2012 guest appearance on The Colbert Report, he expressed his views on the leading Republican candidates for president, Mitt Romney and Newt Gingrich. Cassidy said, "I believe both of them are the most embarrassing, sad, pathetic ... I mean, really, this is the best we can do?"

=== Alcohol-related driving incidents and criminal charges ===
Cassidy was arrested for driving under the influence (DUI) in Florida on November 3, 2010.

Cassidy was arrested for DUI in Schodack, New York, in the early hours of August 21, 2013. He was pulled over after failing to dim his headlights as he passed a police car going in the opposite direction. After performing poorly on a field sobriety test, Cassidy was subjected to an alcohol breath test, returning a blood alcohol level of 0.10%, which was above the New York legal limit of 0.08%. The arresting officer, named Tom Jones, reported that Cassidy was polite and courteous. Referring to a 1965 hit song by singer Tom Jones, Cassidy jokingly asked the officer, "What's New, Pussycat?" Cassidy was charged, taken to jail, and released several hours later on $2,500 bail. On May 12, 2015, Cassidy was sentenced to community service, a fine, and a six-month license suspension.

Cassidy was arrested on suspicion of DUI in California on January 10, 2014, after he made an illegal right turn against a red light. He was held overnight in jail, ordered to undergo inpatient rehabilitation, and placed on probation for five years.

On September 9, 2015, Cassidy was cited in Fort Lauderdale, Florida, on charges of leaving the scene of a car accident, improper lane change, expired plates and driving on a suspended license.

=== Illness and death ===
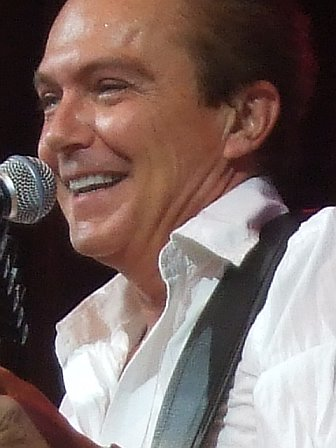
Cassidy performing in 2007

In 2008, Cassidy spoke at a fundraiser for the Alcohol and Substance Abuse Prevention Council of Saratoga County, New York, where he publicly disclosed his issues with alcoholism for the first time.

On February 20, 2017, following a performance in Agoura Hills, California, in which Cassidy had difficulty remembering the lyrics of songs he had been performing for nearly 50 years, and appeared to fall off the stage, he announced that he was living with dementia and was retiring from all further performing. He said that his mother and grandfather had also suffered from dementia at the end of their lives. He said, "I was in denial, but a part of me always knew this was coming."

Later in 2017, Cassidy fell ill at a recording studio and was hospitalized. In a later phone conversation with an A&E producer, he stated that he had just met with his doctor, that he had liver disease, and that his life had "changed dramatically." Cassidy added that he had been unconscious and near death for the first few days after the incident, but that his memory had returned. Cassidy also acknowledged that there was "no sign of [dementia] at this stage of [my] life," adding that "[it] was complete alcohol poisoning—and the fact is, I lied about my drinking." Cassidy said, "You know, I did it to myself, man. I did it to myself to cover up the sadness and the emptiness." Cassidy had told his family and others that he had given up drinking.

On November 18, 2017, Cassidy was hospitalized with liver and kidney failure, and was critically ill in a medically induced coma. He came out of the coma two days later, remaining in critical but stable condition. Doctors hoped to keep Cassidy stable until a liver became available for transplant, but he died of liver failure on November 21, 2017, at the age of 67. According to his daughter, Katie Cassidy, his final words were "So much wasted time."

== Memoirs ==
In 1994, Cassidy, in collaboration with Chip Deffaa, wrote his autobiography C'mon, Get Happy ... Fear and Loathing on the Partridge Family Bus.

Cassidy also wrote a memoir, Could It Be Forever? My Story, published in the United Kingdom in March 2007, which gives further details about his personal life.

== Discography ==
=== With the Partridge Family ===
- The Partridge Family Album (1970)
- Up to Date (1971)
- Sound Magazine (1971)
- A Partridge Family Christmas Card (1971)
- Shopping Bag (1972)
- The Partridge Family Notebook (1972)
- Crossword Puzzle (1973)
- Bulletin Board (1973)

=== Solo ===
- Cherish (1972)
- Rock Me Baby (1972)
- Dreams Are Nuthin' More Than Wishes (1973)
- The Higher They Climb (1975)
- Home Is Where the Heart Is (1976)
- Gettin' It in the Street (1976)
- Romance (1985)
- David Cassidy (1990)
- Didn't You Used to Be... (1992)
- Old Trick New Dog (1998)
- A Touch of Blue (2003)
- David Cassidy Part II – The Remix (2007) also known as Dance Party Remix, an electronic dance music remix album released via 180 Music and Target
- Live in Concert (2008) DVD and CD live set
- I Think I Love You: Greatest Hits Live (2010) Live CD/DVD and vinyl release via Cleopatra Records
- Live in Concert (2010) Live CD release via ZYX Music
- David Cassidy Christmas (2016) Holiday-themed studio album via Big Music
- Songs My Father Taught Me (2018) Posthumous EP featuring covers of standards made famous by Jack Cassidy

== Filmography ==
Year	Title	Role	Notes	Reference
1969	The Survivors	Mike	Episode: "Chapter Seven"	
1969	Ironside	Danny Goodson	Episode: "Stolen on Demand"	
1970	Adam-12	Tim Richmond	Episode: "Log 24 A Rare Occasion"	
1970	Bonanza	Billy Burgess	Episode: "The Law and Billy Burgess"	
1970	Marcus Welby, M.D.	Michael Ambrose	Episode: "Fun and Games and Michael Ambrose"	
1970	Medical Center	Rick Lambert	Episode: "His Brother's Keeper"	
1970	The Mod Squad	Brad Johnson	Episode: "The Loser"	
1970	The F.B.I.	Larry Wentworth	Episode: "Fatal Impostor"	
1970–74	The Partridge Family	Keith Partridge	96 episodes	
1978	Police Story	Officer Dan Shay	Episode: "A Chance to Live"	
1978–79	David Cassidy: Man Undercover	Officer Dan Shay	10 episodes; also composer of theme music	
1980	The Love Boat	Ted Harmes	1 episode	
1980	The Night the City Screamed	David Greeley	TV movie	
1980/83	Fantasy Island	Jeremy Todd / Danny Collier	2 episodes	
1982	Matt Houston	John Gordon Boyd	Episode: "Joey's Here"	
1983	Parade of Stars	George M. Cohan	TV movie	
1983	Tales of the Unexpected	Donald / David	Episode: "Heir Presumptuous"	
1988	Alfred Hitchcock Presents	Joey Mitchell	Episode: "Career Move"	
1990	Instant Karma	Reno		
1990	The Spirit of '76	Adam-11		
1991	Blossom	Himself	Episode: "A Rockumentary"	
1991	The Flash	Sam Scudder/Mirror Master	Episode: "Done with Mirrors"	
1992	The Ben Stiller Show	David Cassidy	Episode: "With Flea"	
1993	Ein Schloß am Wörthersee	Patrick Riley	Episode: "Falsches Spiel mit Patrick"	
1995	The John Larroquette Show	Jefferson Kelly	Episode: "Wrestling Matches"; also composer of theme music	
2003	Malcolm in the Middle	Boone Vincent	Episode: "Vegas"	
2003	The Agency	Everett Price	Episode: "War, Inc."	
2003	I Love the '70s	Himself		
2004	Kim Possible	Roland Pond (voice)	Episode: "Oh Boyz"	
2005	Less than Perfect	Vince	Episode: "Playhouse"	
2005	Popstar	Grant		
2009	Ruby & The Rockits	David Gallagher	10 episodes	
2011	Celebrity Apprentice	Himself/contestant	2 episodes	
2013	CSI: Crime Scene Investigation	Peter Coe	Episode: "Last Woman Standing"	
2018	David Cassidy: The Last Session	Himself	TV special; posthumous release	
