= Dizzy Detectives =

1943 American short film by Jules White

- Directed by: Jules White
- Written by: Felix Adler
- Produced by: Jules White
- Starring: Moe Howard; Larry Fine; Curly Howard; Bud Jamison; Lynton Brent; John Tyrrell; Dick Jensen; Ray "Crash" Corrigan
- Cinematography: Benjamin H. Kline
- Edited by: Jerome Thoms
- Distributed by: Columbia Pictures
- Release date: February 5, 1943 (U.S.)
- Running time: 18:38
- Country: United States
- Language: English

Dizzy Detectives is a 1943 short subject directed by Jules White starring American slapstick comedy team The Three Stooges (Moe Howard, Larry Fine and Curly Howard). It is the 68th entry in the series released by Columbia Pictures starring the comedians, who released 190 shorts for the studio between 1934 and 1959.

== Plot ==
Following a series of mishaps during a door installation endeavor, the Stooges find themselves recruited as police officers by the police commissioner. Tasked with apprehending the notorious "Ape Man," a thief disguised in a gorilla suit, they face the ultimatum of capturing the criminal or risking their positions.

Acting on a tip regarding the Ape Man's whereabouts, the Stooges stake out an antique store. During their surveillance, Curly's encounter with a rocking chair inadvertently entangles him with a startled cat, resulting in chaos. The situation escalates when they confront the Ape Man, revealed to be a genuine gorilla named Bonzo, who effortlessly bends their firearms. Subsequently, they uncover a conspiracy involving Mr. Dill, head of the citizen's league, who seeks to oust the police chief for personal gain.

The Stooges engage in a physical brawl with the thugs responsible for orchestrating the Ape Man's activities, ultimately confronting Bonzo. Utilizing multiple slapstick methods, they go on to defeat the thugs in a series of brawls. The climax occurs when Curly, faced with Bonzo, delivers a decisive headbutt that triggers the gorilla's explosive demise due to ingesting nitroglycerin.

== Cast ==
=== Credited ===
- Moe Howard as Moe
- Larry Fine as Larry
- Curly Howard as Curly

=== Uncredited ===
- Bud Jamison as Police Commissioner
- Dick Botiller as Police Detective
- John Tyrrell as Mr. Dill
- Lynton Brent as Henchman
- Dick Jensen as Henchman
- Ray "Crash" Corrigan as Bonzo the gorilla

== Production notes ==
Dizzy Detectives was filmed over four days on June 29-July 2, 1942. The opening carpentry scene is recycled footage from 1935's Pardon My Scotch, including footage of Moe crashing to the floor and breaking three ribs.

This is the second of three Stooge shorts with the word "dizzy" in the title.

Dizzy Detectives was remade — line-by-line — with future third Stooge Joe Besser and Jim Hawthorne as 'Fraidy Cat in 1951; Fraidy Cat was itself remade in 1955 as Hook a Crook, using stock footage. Jules White directed all three films.
