= Partridge Family 2200 A.D. =

1974 American science-fiction TV series

- Also known as: The Partridge Family in Outer Space
- Genre: Science fiction Sitcom
- Based on: The Partridge Family by Bernard Slade
- Directed by: Charles A. Nichols
- Voices of: Joan Gerber; Danny Bonaduce; Sherry Alberoni; Chuck McLendon; Suzanne Crough; Brian Forster; John Stephenson; Susan Dey (2 episodes); Frank Welker
- Country of origin: United States
- Original language: English
- No. of seasons: 1
- No. of episodes: 16

Production
- Executive producers: William Hanna; Joseph Barbera
- Running time: 30 minutes
- Production companies: Hanna-Barbera Productions; Columbia Pictures Television

Original release
- Network: CBS
- Release: September 7 – December 21, 1974

Related
- The Partridge Family; The Jetsons; Fred Flintstone and Friends

Partridge Family 2200 A.D. is an American science fiction Saturday-morning animated series produced by Hanna-Barbera Productions and Columbia Pictures Television, first broadcast on CBS from September to December 1974, with reruns into March 1975. A spin-off adapted from the ABC live-action sitcom The Partridge Family (1970–74), the animated titular band performed one of their pop hits in each episode.

== Production ==
While in pre-production, Hanna-Barbera originally proposed an updated version of The Jetsons, in which Elroy would be a teenager and Judy would have a steady job as an ace reporter. CBS, under the leadership of Fred Silverman, discarded the idea and decided to make an animated version of The Partridge Family instead. The Partridge Family had already been recurring characters on a previous Hanna-Barbera production, Goober and the Ghost Chasers.

In this new iteration of the series, The Partridge Family is inexplicably changed from their early 1970s setting to Jetsons-like futuristic environment in 2200 A.D. The family's musical act is "galaxy-famous" and more successful than in the live-action show where they were portrayed as early in their careers, and they appear to manage themselves: the character of Ruben Kincaid is not a regular. Danny has a robotic dog named Orbit, and Keith and Laurie have two good friends that travel with the family (though they are not part of the musical act): Marion, a two-toned green-and-blue Martian who can fly, and Veenie, a purple-haired Venusian with a distinct buzzing vocal tic.

Danny Bonaduce, Suzanne Crough, and Brian Forster voiced their respective characters from the live action series. Susan Dey provided Laurie's voice for only two episodes before she was replaced by Sherry Alberoni, who had voiced Alexandra for Hanna-Barbera's Josie and the Pussycats. Chuck McLenan served as both the speaking and singing voice of Keith Partridge instead of David Cassidy; Joan Gerber voiced Shirley Partridge in place of Shirley Jones, while John Stephenson took over the role of Reuben Kincaid from Dave Madden in the few episodes in which he appears.

Micky Dolenz, a member of The Monkees, had various recurring roles in the series, one of his first voice-over roles.

Sixteen half-hour episodes were produced for Partridge Family 2200 A.D., which lasted half a season on CBS Saturday morning (September 7, 1974 – March 8, 1975). In 1977–78, it was retitled The Partridge Family in Outer Space when episodes were serialized on the syndicated weekday series Fred Flintstone and Friends. Like many animated series created by Hanna-Barbera in the 1970s, the series contained a laugh track created by the studio.

Due to its ties with The Partridge Family, the animated spin-off is one of two Hanna-Barbera series owned outright by Sony Pictures Television (whose predecessor, Screen Gems, produced the live-action Partridge series). The other series owned by Sony is Jeannie (an animated I Dream of Jeannie spin-off) with the copyrights to both animated series now owned by CPT Holdings.

== Cast ==
- Sherry Alberoni as Laurie Partridge
- Danny Bonaduce as Danny Partridge
- Suzanne Crough as Tracy Partridge
- Susan Dey as Laurie Partridge (in 2 episodes)
- Micky Dolenz as Wonderful Wayne, Spotless Sam
- Brian Forster as Chris Partridge
- Joan Gerber as Shirley Partridge, Energetic Emma
- Chuck McLenan as Keith Partridge, Zappy Zak
- Julie McWhirter as Marion Moonglow
- Hal Smith as Texx
- John Stephenson as Reuben Kincaid
- Lennie Weinrib as Jolly Joe
- Frank Welker as Orbit, Veenie

Chuck McLenan also was the singing voice for musical numbers.

== Episodes ==
No.	Title	Original release date	Prod. code
1	"Danny, the Invisible Man = Danny buys a space antidote called a Molex that makes him invisible in order to impress a girl and to show off Freddy."	September 7, 1974	77-2
2	"If This Is Texas — It Must Be Doomsday = The Partidge Family, Veenie, and Marion are invited to Texx’s ranch in Texas. But Texx wants them to stay there. So the gang do all they can to leave the country."	September 14, 1974	77-4
3	"The Incredible Shrinking Keith = Danny accidentally makes his older brother Keith shrink. So he must try to make Keith back to normal size before a gig."	September 21, 1974	77-3
4	"Cousin Sunspot = Sunspot visits the Partridge Family, where he is not a good singer. So the family try their best to help him. Later, Sunspot suddenly grows chicken feathers from a machine and flies off."	September 28, 1974	77-5
5	"The Wax Museum = The Partidge Family visits a wax museum while 2 thieves steal wax dummies, especially the Partridge Family look-alikes, in order to become rich."	October 5, 1974	77-7
6	"The Dog Catcher = A dognapper tries to kidnap Orbit while the family is at a hotel. So Danny must keep the dog catcher away while doing a gig."	October 12, 1974	77-6
7	"Cupcake Caper = A precious ring is stolen and is nowhere to be found. However, Shirley believes the ring must been with the cakes. So the gang must find the ring."	October 19, 1974	77-11
8	"Laurie's Computer Date = Keith, Danny, and Orbit find a perfect match date for Laurie for the Harvest Hop after Khan refuses to go there."	October 26, 1974	77-8
9	"Movie Madness = The Partridge Family fly to a movie studio where Keith is starred in one of the movies."	November 2, 1974	77-9
10	"The Pink Letter = After accidentally mailing the pink letter, Danny, Veenie, Orbit, and Keith must retrieve it to Laurie."	November 9, 1974	77-10
11	"Orbit the Genius = Danny and Orbit attempt to win money in a game show, Meanwhile, a double-headed troublemaker makes a dog who looks like Orbit, so they can get that exact money."	November 16, 1974	77-12
12	"The Switch = Keith switches bodies with a gorilla named Bongo, causing confusion to everyone. However, the switch gives Danny an idea for a one-time gig."	November 23, 1974	77-13
13	"My Son, the Spaceball Star = Danny tries to fit in with the spaceball team so that his mom won’t be disappointed."	November 30, 1974	77-1
14	"Car Trouble = Danny accidentally destroys Keith’s brand new space car. So Laurie and the gang convince Keith to stay at the house while Danny and Orbit take the car to a repair shop."	December 7, 1974	77-14
15	"The Roobits = Danny receives a mail package of small furry alien called “Roobits”. However, things start to go haywire when the “Roobits” start to multiply and roam the house. So the gang sell the “Roobits” to people who want one."	December 14, 1974	77-15
16	"Let's All Stick Together = Danny returns a priceless fish antique sculpture broken after he accidentally disposes it. Later, the family find out everything sticks together by a special type of superglue."	December 21, 1974	77-16

== Home media ==
In October 2005, two restored episodes of Partridge Family 2200 A.D., "My Son, The Spaceball Star" and "Car Trouble", were included as bonuses on The Partridge Family: The Complete First Season DVD set.

== See also ==
- List of animated spin-offs from prime time shows
