= Fred Flintstone and Friends =

American animated television series

- Genre: Comedy; Anthology
- Developed by: Sidney Morse
- Directed by: Charles A. Nichols (animation director); William Hanna; Joseph Barbera
- Presented by: Henry Corden
- Voices of: Henry Corden; Mel Blanc; Gay Autterson; Sally Struthers; Carl Esser; Mitzi McCall; Don Messick; Jay North; Mickey Stevens; Daws Butler; Lennie Weinrib; Julie McWhirter; Joe Besser; Suzanne Crough; Danny Bonaduce; Brian Forster; Joan Gerber; Chuck McClendon; Sherri Alberoni; Allan Melvin; John Stephenson; Julie Bennett; Ronnie Schell; Jo Ann Harris; Jerry Dexter; Paul Winchell
- Theme music composer: Hoyt Curtin Ted Nichols
- Opening theme: "Fred Flintstone and Friends"
- Composer: Hoyt Curtin (musical director) Ted Nichols (musical director)
- Country of origin: United States
- Original language: English
- No. of seasons: 1
- No. of episodes: 95

Production
- Executive producers: William Hanna; Joseph Barbera
- Producers: Iwao Takamoto (creative producer/production design); William Hanna; Joseph Barbera
- Camera setup: Dick Blundell; George Epperson; Roy Wade; Tom Barnes; Ralph Migliori
- Running time: 30 minutes
- Production companies: Hanna-Barbera Productions; Columbia Pictures Television

Original release
- Network: Syndication
- Release: September 12, 1977 – September 1, 1978

Related
- The Flintstone Comedy Hour; The New Fred and Barney Show

Fred Flintstone and Friends is an American animated anthology wheel series and a spin-off of The Flintstones produced by Hanna-Barbera and Columbia Pictures Television that aired in daily first-run syndication from September 12, 1977, to September 1, 1978. The series was packaged by Columbia Pictures Television during the 1977–78 television season and was available for barter syndication through Claster Television through the mid-1980s.

Henry Corden made his official debut as Fred Flintstone's speaking voice on this series after Alan Reed died in June 1977. Corden had previously appeared as Fred's singing voice in the theatrical film The Man Called Flintstone (1966) and the television specials Alice in Wonderland or What's a Nice Kid like You Doing in a Place like This? (1966) and Energy: A National Issue (1977). He continued providing Fred's voice in future Flintstones spin-off series and specials, as well as Cocoa Pebbles and Fruity Pebbles cereal commercials, until his death in 2005.

== Overview ==
The series is hosted by Fred Flintstone and featured a repackaging of the following six Hanna-Barbera Saturday morning cartoons that were originally broadcast by the various networks:

- The Flintstone Comedy Hour (1972–1974) ("Fred and Barney" and "The Bedrock Rockers" segments)
- Goober and the Ghost Chasers (1973)
- Jeannie (1973–1975)
- Partridge Family 2200 A.D. (1974–1975) (re-titled The Partridge Family in Outer Space)
- The Pebbles and Bamm-Bamm Show (1971–1972)
- Yogi's Gang (1973)

== Voice cast ==
- Henry Corden as Fred Flintstone (Host), Paw Rugg, Dr. Bigot (Yogi's Gang)
- Josh Albee as Freddy, Jimmy (Yogi's Gang)
- Sherry Alberoni as Laurie Partridge (The Partridge Family in Outer Space)
- Julie Bennett as Cindy Bear (Yogi's Gang)
- Joe Besser as Babu (Jeannie)
- Mel Blanc as Barney Rubble, Dino, Zonk, Stub (The Pebbles and Bamm-Bamm Show, The Flintstone Comedy Hour)
- Danny Bonaduce as Danny Partridge (Goober and the Ghost Chasers, The Partridge Family in Outer Space)
- Tom Bosley as Commadore Phineas P. Fibber (Yogi's Gang)
- Daws Butler as Yogi Bear, Huckleberry Hound, Quick Draw McGraw, Snagglepuss, Wally Gator, Peter Potamus, Augie Doggie, Hokey Wolf, Lippy the Lion, Baba Looey (Yogi's Gang)
- Tommy Cook as S. Melvin Farthinghill (Jeannie)
- Suzanne Crough as Tracy Partridge (Goober and the Ghost Chasers, The Partridge Family in Outer Space)
- Jerry Dexter as Ted (Goober and the Ghost Chasers)
- Susan Dey as Laurie Partridge (Goober and the Ghost Chasers)
- Micky Dolenz as Wonderful Wayne, Spotless Sam (The Partridge Family in Outer Space)
- Carl Esser as Fabian (The Pebbles and Bamm-Bamm Show, The Flintstone Comedy Hour)
- Brian Forster as Chris Partridge (Goober and the Ghost Chasers, The Partridge Family in Outer Space)
- Joan Gerber as Shirley Partridge (The Partridge Family in Outer Space)
- Virginia Gregg as Gossipy Witch of the West (Yogi's Gang)
- Mark Hamill as Corey Anders (Jeannie)
- Jo Ann Harris as Tina (Goober and the Ghost Chasers)
- Gay Hartwig as Betty Rubble, Wiggy, Cindy (The Pebbles and Bamm-Bamm Show, The Flintstone Comedy Hour)
- Bob Hastings as Henry Glopp (Jeannie)
- Rose Marie as Lotta Litter (Yogi's Gang)
- Mitzi McCall as Penny (The Pebbles and Bamm-Bamm Show, The Flintstone Comedy Hour)
- Chuck McLenan as Keith Partridge (The Partridge Family in Outer Space)
- Julie McWhirter as Jeannie (Jeannie), Marion (The Partridge Family in Outer Space)
- Allan Melvin as Magilla Gorilla, Mr. Sloppy, Mr. Neat, Professor Haggling (Yogi's Gang)
- Don Messick as Boo-Boo Bear, Ranger Smith, Touché Turtle, Atom Ant, Squiddly Diddly, Mayor of Smog City (Yogi's Gang), Schleprock (The Pebbles and Bamm-Bamm Show, The Flintstone Comedy Hour)
- Jay North as Bamm-Bamm Rubble (The Pebbles and Bamm-Bamm Show, The Flintstone Comedy Hour)
- Alan Reed as Fred Flintstone (The Pebbles and Bamm-Bamm Show, The Flintstone Comedy Hour)
- Ronnie Schell as Gilly (Goober and the Ghost Chasers)
- Hal Smith as J. Wanton Vandal, Smiley the Hobo (Yogi's Gang)
- John Stephenson as Doggie Daddy, Hardy Har Har, Mr. Cheerful, Greedy Genie, Hilarious P. Prankster, Envy Brother #2, Captain Swashbuckle Swipe, Fumbo Jumbo the Masked Avenger, Mr. Hothead, Professor Bickering (Yogi's Gang), Mr. Slate, Noodles (The Pebbles and Bamm-Bamm Show, The Flintstone Comedy Hour), Haji (Jeannie), Reuben Kincaid (The Partridge Family in Outer Space)
- Mickey Stevens as Pebbles Flintstone (The Flintstone Comedy Hour)
- Sally Struthers as Pebbles Flintstone (The Pebbles and Bamm-Bamm Show)
- Jean Vander Pyl as Wilma Flintstone (The Pebbles and Bamm-Bamm Show, The Flintstone Comedy Hour), Maw Rugg (Yogi's Gang)
- Janet Waldo as Mrs. Anders (Jeannie)
- Lennie Weinrib as Smokestack Smog (Yogi's Gang), Moonrock, Bronto (The Pebbles and Bamm-Bamm Show, The Flintstone Comedy Hour), Jolly Joe (The Partridge Family in Outer Space)
- Frank Welker as Orbit, Veenie (The Partridge Family in Outer Space)
- Jesse White as Peter D. Cheater (Yogi's Gang)
- Paul Winchell as Goober (Goober and the Ghost Chasers), Sheik of Selfishness (Yogi's Gang)

=== Additional voices ===
- Walker Edmiston –
- Jim MacGeorge –
- Wilt Chamberlain as himself
- Michael Gray as himself

== Weekly airing schedule ==
The following segments were broadcast in odd weeks:

Monday	Tuesday	Wednesday	Thursday	Friday
Jeannie [Part 1] Yogi's Gang [Part 1]	Jeannie [Part 2] Yogi's Gang [Part 2]	Goober and the Ghost Chasers [Part 1] Yogi's Gang [Part 3]	Goober and the Ghost Chasers [Part 2] The Partridge Family in Outer Space [Part 1]	Goober and the Ghost Chasers [Part 3] The Partridge Family in Outer Space [Part 2]

The following segments were broadcast in even weeks:

Monday	Tuesday	Wednesday	Thursday	Friday
The Pebbles and Bamm-Bamm Show	The Flintstone Comedy Hour	The Pebbles and Bamm-Bamm Show	The Flintstone Comedy Hour	The Pebbles and Bamm-Bamm Show

== See also ==
- Hanna–Barbera's World of Super Adventure, a later rerun anthology series
- USA Cartoon Express, a daily cartoon block that featured some of these series
