= Rod Hardy =

Australian television and film director

- Born: 1949 (age 75–76); Melbourne, Victoria, Australia
- Occupations: Television director; film director

Rod Hardy (born 1949) is an Australian film and television director.

== Career ==
His interest in film began before the age of 12, when he shot several short films on his brother's 8 mm film camera. Hardy has over 350 hours of credits directing television drama in his native Australia.

Hardy directed the 1979 horror feature film Thirst starring Chantal Contouri, which won Best Picture in its category at the 1980 Asia Pacific Film Festival.

Having worked as a producer and director on the TV series, E Street from 1989 to 1991, Hardy moved to Los Angeles in 1992. His first project as director was Lies and Lullabies a story of drug addicts, starring Susan Dey and Piper Laurie. He directed Buffalo Girls (1995), which received two Golden Globe, one Screen Actors Guild and 11 Emmy award nominations.

Hardy has worked on shows such as The X-Files, Battlestar Galactica and Leverage.

== Filmography (as director) ==
=== Films and miniseries ===
- Thirst (1979)
- Sara Dane (1982)
- Under Capricorn (1983)
- Eureka Stockade (1984)
- Shadows of the Heart (1990)
- Rio Diablo (1993)
- Between Love and Hate (1993)
- Lies and Lullabies (1993)
- The Only Way Out (1993)
- My Name Is Kate (1994)
- The Yearling (1994)
- Buffalo Girls (1995)
- An Unfinished Affair (1996)
- 20,000 Leagues Under the Sea (1997)
- Robinson Crusoe (1997)
- Two For Texas (1998)
- Nick Fury: Agent of S.H.I.E.L.D. (1998)
- High Noon (2000)
- Route 52 (2002)
- December Boys (2007)
- Silent Night (2014)
- Lucky Valentine (2014)

=== TV series ===
- E Street (co-executive producer)
- The Mentalist
- Leverage
- Mental
- Saving Grace
- Dollhouse
- Burn Notice
- Battlestar Galactica
- JAG
- The X-Files
- Powers
- The Librarians
- Prisoner
- Neighbours, including the iconic wedding episode

== See also ==
- Not Quite Hollywood
