= Julie Khaner =

Canadian television and film actress (born 1957)

- Born: December 5, 1957 (age 68); Montreal, Quebec, Canada
- Occupation: Actress
- Years active: 1980–present

Julie Khaner (born December 5, 1957) is a Canadian television and film actress, best known for her roles in as Alana Newman Robinovitch in Street Legal, Emily Henchpaw in the 1995 version of Jake and the Kid, Sidney Dernhoff in The Newsroom, Gen in Deepwater Black and Bridey James in Videodrome. She also appeared in the 1995 Susan Dey vampire flick Deadly Love.

== Career ==
Khaner is a two-time Gemini Award nominee, receiving nominations for Best Supporting Actress in a Drama Series in 1994 for Street Legal and Best Actress in a Dramatic Program or Miniseries in 1999 for the television film Justice.

In 2000, she appeared in All-American Girl: The Mary Kay Letourneau Story.

== Filmography ==
=== Film ===
Year	Title	Role	Notes
1980	Virus: The End	Secretary	
1983	Videodrome	Bridey	
1983	Spasms	Marcie	
2005	Bailey's Billion$	Mrs. Blake	
2009	Chloe	Bimsy	
2016	Ballerina	Regine	
2017	Shimmer Lake	Mrs. Dawkins	
2018	Backstabbing for Beginners	Melina Pasaris	
2018	State Like Sleep	Anneke	

=== Television ===
Year	Title	Role	Notes
1981	Escape from Iran: The Canadian Caper	Kathy Stafford	Television film
1986	Night Heat	Gita	Episode: "Friends"
1987	Adderly	Miriam Gitterman	Episode: "The Bridge"
1988	The Twilight Zone	Various roles	2 episodes
1989	War of the Worlds	Alien woman	Episode: "Vengeance Is Mine"
1989	My Secret Identity	Sgt. Meg Sullivan	Episode: "Caught in the Middle"
1989	E.N.G.	Marshall	Episode: "Special Segment"
1989–1994	Street Legal	Alana Newman Robinovitch	85 episodes
1995	Choices of the Heart	Anita Block	Television film
1995	TekWar	Warden Caruso	Episode: "Chill Factor"
1995	Friends at Last	Blair	Television film
1995	Deadly Love	Poole	Television film
1995–1997	Jake and the Kid	Emily Henchpaw	9 episodes
1996	Goosebumps	Marilyn Boswell	2 episodes
1996	The Newsroom	Sidney Dernhoff	5 episodes
1997	When Innocence Is Lost	Jane Littleton	Television film
1997	Mission Genesis	Gen	13 episodes
1998	F/X: The Series	Dr. Sheila McAvoy	Episode: "Reaper"
1999	Escape from Mars	Gail McConnell	Television film
1999	Justice	Mimi Druckman	Television film
1999	Strange Justice	Julie Desavia	Television film
1999	Sirens	Fox Hills	Television film
2000	All-American Girl: The Mary Kay Letourneau Story	Det. Coughlin	Television film
2001	Queer as Folk	Laura	Episode: "Daddy Dearest (Sonny Boy)"
2001	Blue Murder	Dr. Adrienne Poole	Episode: "Asylum"
2002	The Associates	Ms. Shocktner	Episode: "The Hitler Paradox"
2002	Doc	Monica Wellington	Episode: "My Boyfriend's Back"
2004	1-800-Missing	Judge Elizabeth Hahn	Episode: "Judgement Day"
2005	Choice: The Henry Morgentaler Story	Gertie Katz	Television film
2005	Martha: Behind Bars	Mariana Pasternak	Television film
2005	Degrassi: The Next Generation	Elizabeth	Episode: "Death of a Disco Dancer"
2005	This Is Wonderland	Carolyn Wright	Episode #3.4
2006	Why I Wore Lipstick to My Mastectomy	Meredith	Television film
2007	The Best Years	Ilana Beecham	2 episodes
2012	The Firm	Judge J. Kerzan	3 episodes
2014	Not With My Daughter	Judge Fordham	Television film
2015	Merry Matrimony	Carol Traverston	Television film
2016	Murdoch Mysteries	Dr. Augusta Stowe-Gullen	Episode: "Jagged Little Pill"
2017	Ransom	Dr. Helen Rowe	Episode: "Grand Slam"
2021-2022	In the Dark	Kate Simmons	5 episodes
