= Goober and the Ghost Chasers =

American animated television series

- Genre: Mystery; Comedy
- Directed by: Charles A. Nichols
- Voices of: Paul Winchell; Jerry Dexter; Jo Ann Harris; Ronnie Schell
- Theme music composer: Hoyt Curtin
- Composer: Hoyt Curtin
- Country of origin: United States
- Original language: English
- No. of seasons: 1
- No. of episodes: 16

Production
- Executive producers: William Hanna; Joseph Barbera
- Running time: 30 minutes
- Production company: Hanna-Barbera Productions

Original release
- Network: ABC
- Release: September 8 – December 22, 1973

Related
- Fred Flintstone and Friends; Partridge Family 2200 A.D.

Goober and the Ghost Chasers is an American animated television series produced by Hanna-Barbera Productions, broadcast on ABC from September 8 to December 22, 1973. A total of 16 half-hour episodes of Goober and the Ghost Chasers were produced. It was later serialized as part of the syndicated weekday series Fred Flintstone and Friends during 1977–78. On cable, it was shown as part of USA Cartoon Express and on Boomerang starting in 2000.

Like many animated television programs created by Hanna-Barbera in the 1970s, the show contained a laugh track created by the studio. Cartoon Network and Boomerang airings of the show have the track muted.

== Plot ==
Similar to Hanna-Barbera's earlier series Scooby-Doo, Where Are You!, Goober and the Ghost Chasers centers on three teenagers—Ted, Gilly and Tina—solving mysteries with their companion Goober, a spindly, green-colored Saluki who can involuntarily become invisible. Writing for the Ghost Chasers Magazine, the group travel to various places and use equipment from their Apparition Kit to determine whether or not the ghost is real. Eventually, the group comes across the real ghost, which would help in defeating the fake ghosts; in some instances, the impostors are not actually criminals. Compared to Scooby-Doo, Goober can speak more clearly, but his dialogue is not understood by other characters; Goober's lines are mainly fourth wall-breaking retorts.

=== Guest appearances ===
The Partridge children, characters from The Partridge Family, made semi-regular appearances in the series, featuring in eight episodes; their respective voice actors reprised their roles. Wilt Chamberlain and Michael Gray each appeared once.

== Cast ==
- Paul Winchell as Goober
- Jerry Dexter as Ted
- Jo Ann Harris as Tina
- Ronnie Schell as Gilly

=== Additional ===
- Danny Bonaduce as Danny Partridge
- Suzanne Crough as Tracy Partridge
- Susan Dey as Laurie Partridge
- Brian Forster as Chris Partridge
- Wilt Chamberlain as himself
- Michael Gray as himself

== Episodes ==
No.	Title	Directed by	Written by	Original release date
1	"Assignment: The Ahab Apparition"	William Hanna & Joseph Barbera	Tom Dagenais, Warren S. Murray & Dick Robbins	September 8, 1973
The Partridge Kids are vacationing at Peaceful Cove, but it's anything but peaceful. The ghost of Captain Ahab and Moby Dick are haunting the old mansion on the cliff and it's up to Goober and the kids to interview them for their magazine. Guest-starring the Partridge Kids.
2	"Brush Up Your Shakespeare"	William Hanna & Joseph Barbera	Tom Dagenais, Warren S. Murray & Dick Robbins	September 15, 1973
The Partridge Kids are supposed to play a concert but their performance is canceled when Macbeth's ghost begins haunting the hall. Guest-starring the Partridge Kids.
3	"The Galloping Ghost"	William Hanna & Joseph Barbera	Tom Dagenais, Warren S. Murray & Dick Robbins	September 22, 1973
Goober and the kids investigate Wilt Chamberlain's ranch after a report of a "Galloping Ghost" to get a story for their latest article for Ghost Chasers magazine.
4	"The Singing Ghost"	William Hanna & Joseph Barbera	Tom Dagenais, Warren S. Murray & Dick Robbins	September 29, 1973
Frankenstein's Monster the Third tricks Danny and the Partridge Kids into visiting his castle to discuss a singing engagement. Once there, they realize the only thing he wants is Danny's voice for his own. Guest-starring the Partridge Kids.
5	"The Ghost Ship"	William Hanna & Joseph Barbera	Tom Dagenais, Warren S. Murray & Dick Robbins	October 6, 1973
Goober and the gang are aboard an old pirate ship called the Sea Witch for publicity pictures. The Sea Witch is soon set adrift by the salty spirits led by Captain Dunk. They also encounter Dunk's nicer twin brother, Dink. Guest-starring the Partridge Kids.
6	"Mummy Knows Best"	William Hanna & Joseph Barbera	Tom Dagenais, Warren S. Murray & Dick Robbins	October 13, 1973
The Partridge Kids, Goober, and the gang decide to spend their vacation in Kahrobi, land of the Arabian Nights and ghosts. There, they encounter King Rashan's brother Prince Tasheel, who states that the Ghost of King Osiris (King Rashan's ancestor) and his Mummies are haunting the city when King Rashan wants to modernize the city. Guest-starring the Partridge Kids.
7	"The Haunted Wax Museum"	William Hanna & Joseph Barbera	Tom Dagenais, Warren S. Murray & Dick Robbins	October 20, 1973
With a day off between concerts, the Partridge Kids decide to visit an old wax museum owned by Willy Waxman. The museum is a hangout for ghosts who have possessed wax mannequins. Guest-starring the Partridge Kids.
8	"Aloha Ghost"	William Hanna & Joseph Barbera	Tom Dagenais, Warren S. Murray & Dick Robbins	October 27, 1973
Goober and the gang travel to Hawaii to do a story on a reported ghost sighting on a plantation where Michael Gray works. Guest starring Michael Gray.
9	"The Wicked Witch Dog"	William Hanna & Joseph Barbera	Tom Dagenais, Warren S. Murray & Dick Robbins	November 3, 1973
A supernatural canine called the Wicked Witch Dog is haunting the lighthouse of MacBurn's Point in Scotland. Guest-starring the Partridge Kids.
10	"Venice Anyone?"	William Hanna & Joseph Barbera	Tom Dagenais, Warren S. Murray & Dick Robbins	November 10, 1973
Goober and the gang travel to Venice to investigate a report of a haunted gondola run by the ghost of an Italian nobleman named Don Giovanni, who wants to prevent Carlo from marrying Julia (from a rival family).
11	"Go West Young Ghost, Go West"	William Hanna & Joseph Barbera	Tom Dagenais, Warren S. Murray & Dick Robbins	November 17, 1973
At an amusement park, the haunted house is a little too haunted for the Partridge Kids, Goober and the gang when they find it haunted by the Ghost of Ichabod Ipswich. Final appearance of the Partridge Kids.
12	"A Hard Day's Knight"	William Hanna & Joseph Barbera	Tom Dagenais, Warren S. Murray & Dick Robbins	November 24, 1973
The Ghost of Don Miguel (a Spanish knight) haunts a space center, which is about to launch the first crewed rocket to Mars.
13	"Is Sherlock Holme?"	William Hanna & Joseph Barbera	Tom Dagenais, Warren S. Murray & Dick Robbins	December 1, 1973
Goober and the gang travel to England to solve a mystery. They are assisted by a relative of the famous detective Sherlock Holmes.
14	"That Snow Ghost"	William Hanna & Joseph Barbera	Tom Dagenais, Warren S. Murray & Dick Robbins	December 8, 1973
Goober and the gang are hired by a ski resort to investigate a reported Snow Ghost.
15	"Inca Dinka Doo"	William Hanna & Joseph Barbera	Tom Dagenais, Warren S. Murray & Dick Robbins	December 15, 1973
The ghost of an ancient Incan chief haunts an old Incan city and forest while the Ghost Chasers are looking for it.
16	"Old McDonald Had a Ghost – EI EI EEYOW"	William Hanna & Joseph Barbera	Tom Dagenais, Warren S. Murray & Dick Robbins	December 22, 1973
Goober and the kids check out a report from George McDonald of a farm that is haunted by the Ghost of Old McDonald and a living scarecrow.

== Merchandising ==
In 1974, King Seeley released a metal lunchbox and thermos featuring Goober, which shared space with another Hanna-Barbera series, Inch High, Private Eye.

Goober was featured in a magic trading card set that was offered free inside Wonder Bread packages in 1974.

== Home media ==
In 1986 and 1988, two videocassette editions of the series were released. Goober and the Ghost Chasers, a 45-minute cassette containing the first two episodes guest-starring The Partridge Kids ("Brush Up Your Shakespeare" and "Assignment: The Ahab Apparition"), was released by Worldvision Home Video on October 21, 1986, and Goober and the Ghost Chasers: The Chase Is On!, an 81-minute cassette containing four episodes ("The Singing Ghost", "Aloha Ghost", "Mummy Knows Best" and "The Haunted Wax Museum"), was released by Hanna-Barbera Home Video on September 29, 1988.

The Goober and the Ghost Chasers' premiere episode, "Assignment: The Ahab Apparition", was included on the DVD compilation Saturday Morning Cartoons: 1970s – Volume 1 released by Warner Home Video on May 26, 2009.

On October 26, 2010, Warner Archive released Goober and the Ghost Chasers: The Complete Series on DVD in region 1 as part of their Hanna–Barbera Classics Collection. This is a Manufacture-on-Demand (MOD) release, available exclusively through Warner's online store and Amazon.com.

== Legacy ==
The Ghost Chasers appeared in the third season of Jellystone!, where they are impersonated by the Really Rottens; they harass Yogi Bear and Boo-Boo Bear, only to be caught in action by characters disguised as Mystery Inc., in a mockery of the Ghost Chasers being a derivative of Mystery Inc.
