= Sirens (1999 film) =

- Poster
- Genre: Drama
- Written by: John Sacret Young
- Directed by: John Sacret Young
- Starring: Dana Delany; Justin Theroux
- Theme music composer: Brian Tyler
- Country of origin: United States
- Original language: English

Production
- Executive producer: John Sacret Young
- Producer: Janet Faust Krusi
- Cinematography: Eagle Egilsson
- Editor: Christopher Nelson
- Running time: 105 minutes
- Production companies: Paramount Network Television; Showtime Networks

Original release
- Network: Showtime
- Release: September 26, 1999

Sirens is a 1999 American crime-drama TV film starring Dana Delany. It premiered on September 26, 1999, on Showtime.

== Plot ==
Sally Rawlings is a white woman who is making out with Vincent Morgan, her black ex-husband in a parked car when a group of policemen surround the car and murder Vincent. The officers then plant phony evidence at the scene of the crime that would point the blame away from them – Sally knows this is a sham and is determined to find out the truth and bring the cops to justice.

== Cast ==
- Dana Delany as Sally Rawlings
- Keith Carradine as Officer Donald Wexler
- Justin Theroux as Officer David Bontempo
- Vondie Curtis-Hall as Vincent Morgan
- Brian Dennehy as Lieutenant Denby
- Richard Blackburn as Sam Conrad
- Jonathan Whittaker as District Attorney
- Sabrina Grdevich as Sheryl
- Julie Khaner as Fox Hills
- Diego Fuentes as Sylvio
- Karen Glave as Tyus
- James Downing as Waranaco
- Matthew Bennett as Roy Dancer
- Carole Mackereth as Virginia
- Victor Saldivia as Denuncio
- Gloria Slade as Franny
- Bruce Clayton as Meyer
- Lili Francks as Julia Morgan
- Kevin Hare as Hicks
- Michael Mitchell as Vinnie
- Tyson McAuley as Dougy
- Robert B. Kennedy as Fenwick
- Michael Stevens as Freddy
- Von Flores as Assistant Coroner
- Layton Morrison as Transvestite
