= Terror Circus =

Nightmare Circus
- Original theatrical poster
- Directed by: Alan Rudolph
- Screenplay by: Roman Valenti
- Story by: Gerald Cormier
- Produced by: Gerald Cormier
- Starring: Andrew Prine; Manuela Thiess; Sherry Alberoni
- Cinematography: E. Lynn
- Edited by: M. K. Productions, Inc.
- Music by: Tommy Vig
- Production company: Pacific Filmmakers
- Distributed by: CMC Pictures Corp.
- Release date: October 31, 1973
- Running time: 86 minutes
- Country: United States
- Language: English

Terror Circus (also released as The Barn of the Naked Dead and Nightmare Circus) is a 1973 American exploitation horror film which is directed by Alan Rudolph, (Note: Sources vary regarding the origins of the film's director(s): According to the American Film Institute, the credited director on the project, Gerald Cormier, is a potential pseudonym for Rudolph. In his book In Theaters Everywhere: A History of the Hollywood Wide Release, 1913-2017 (2018), writer Brian Hannan notes that Gerald Cormier was the name of a stuntman and studio head of the film's independent distributor, CMC Pictures Corporation. Actor Andrew Prine stated in later interviews that two directors were hired to shoot the film before Rudolph took over, one of whom was Gerald Cormier. Furthermore, the American Film Institute's entry for Terror Circus in the AFI Catalog of Feature Films notes that the credited screenwriter, Ralph Harolde, may also be a pseudonym used by Rudolph, though this is unclear.) and starring Andrew Prine, Manuela Thiess, Sherry Alberoni, Gyl Roland, and Sheila Bromley. It follows three showgirls who are kidnapped in the desert by a psychopath who imprisons women in his barn near the former site of a nuclear disaster.

The film's director and writer is credited as Gerald Cormier, the name of a stunt man and head of the film's distributor, CMC Pictures. Some sources indicate that Cormier's name was a pseudonym for Rudolph. According to actor Prine, however, Cormier himself was one of two other directors hired to shoot the film before Rudolph took over directorial duties.

== Plot ==
Simone, Sheri, and Corinne, three showgirls, are traveling through the Mojave Desert to Las Vegas when their car's radiator fails, leaving them stranded overnight. At dawn, a man named Andre offers to bring the women to his property in the desert. They are horrified upon arrival to find Andre's homestead contains a large barn full of shackled women whom he dehumanizes and keeps as prisoners to perform tricks, envisioning himself as a circus showman.

The three women become part of Andre's "troupe" of female slaves, and are chained together and forced to follow his sadistic orders as they march through the desert. One of the women, a scientist, reveals that Andre kidnapped her while she was in the area studying the ecological effects of a nearby nuclear power plant. The women become ecstatic when Andre accidentally leaves the keys to their shackles in the barn, and they make a desperate attempt to free themselves, only to be punished when Andre returns.

Meanwhile, the women's agent, Derek Moore, files a missing persons report, and Sheriff Stanford attempts to locate the three missing showgirls. At Andre's barn, he orders one of the women into the desert where he smears her with calf's blood and sets a caged wild cougar loose to stalk her. The woman flees, only to be slashed to death by an unseen assailant in a shed. Andre takes her body and places it in a laboratory near the barn, where he plays a music box and reminisces about his mother's abandonment of him.

Andre becomes fixated on Simone, whom he believes to be his mother, and confesses to Simone that the military attempted to drive his family from their homestead while conducting a nuclear experiment that left his father grotesquely deformed. Simone placates Andre by playing into his delusions, hoping to free herself and the others. Later, Andre selects Sheri as his next "performer" in which she will play the role of the "Reptile Lady." He throws her to the ground and releases a boa constrictor beside her, forcing her to writhe alongside the snake.

After Simone is locked in Andre's laboratory, she manages to find the keys to the women's shackles, and manages to free herself. She sneaks into the barn and frees several of the other captives before Andrew returns. Meanwhile, Derek and Sheriff Stanford find the women's abandoned car, and Stanford calls in reinforcement. Andre, incensed by Simone's betrayal, douses her in blood and attempts to cage her with the cougar, but one of the freed women incapacitates him and chains him to the cage. Another of the captives enters the nearby shack, where she inadvertently frees Andre's disfigured father. Andre's father, driven insane by the radioactive exposure he suffered, murders Andrew and Simone before entering the barn, where he slaughters the women one by one.

Sheriff Stanford and his deputies arrives at the property, but are too late, finding only one lone survivor, who has been driven insane by the horrors she has witnessed. The deputies locate one other woman wandering the property in a daze, and depart with the two survivors, unaware that Andre's father remains free, roaming the desert.

== Cast ==
- Andrew Prine as Andre
- Manuela Thiess as Simone
- Sherry Alberoni as Sheri
- Gyl Roland as Corinne
- Sheila Bromley as Mrs. Baynor
- Gil Lamb as Mr. Alvarez
- Gerald Cormier as Andre's Father
- Al Cormier as Sheriff Stanford
- Chuck Niles as Derek Moore
- Jeane Manson as Jean
- Sonja Dunson as Sonja

== Production ==
Principal photography of Terror Circus took place in Palmdale, California. The film was largely directed by Alan Rudolph, a protege of Robert Altman, as his directorial debut. However, the film's credits list Gerald Cormier as director, with some sources alleging that Cormier was a pseudonym Rudolph used. According to actor Prine, however, Gerald Cormier, the head of the film's distributor, CMC Pictures Corporation, was one of two other directors hired to make the film before Rudolph took over. According to the American Film Institute, the film's credited writer, Ralph Harolde, may also have been a pseudonym used by Rudolph.

In a 2009 documentary short included on the Code Red DVD and subsequent Blu-ray releases of the film, producer Marvin Almeas and others involved in the making of the film recount that Gerald Cormier was in fact the film's original director, and that Rudolph was an assistant on the production who ultimately took over as director. Cormier appears in the film portraying Andre's deformed father.

Rudolph later said, "I got a call from an acquaintance working on a cheap horror fiasco. Did I want to reshoot the entire movie in a week? Seems after creating unusable footage, the director quit with crew and mostly amateur cast prepaid for five more days. I never read the script or saw the results, but it was another useful learning experience and I’m sure a dreadful piece of work."

Jennifer Ashely recalled "Alan was just the best... One of the producers of the movie started out directing it too and it was horrible! Thankfully, they brought Alan in to replace him and he totally turned that movie around. He met us all, individually, in our trailers before the shoot began and asked us what we wanted to do with our parts,,. To me, that shows you what a great, considerate director he is. "

== Release ==
The film screened under the title Terror Circus in McAllen, Texas on October 31, 1973, and in San Angelo, beginning December 14, 1973. It later screened in Texas under the alternate title The Barn of the Naked Dead in September 1975 on a double bill with The Flesh and Blood Show (1972).

=== Critical response ===
DVD Verdict negatively reviewed the film, commenting that it was "just dull and dumb". In the book Cult Horror Films Welch Everman criticized the movie's attempt to contain what he saw as "phony feminism", as he felt that it was added as a way to allow viewers to enjoy the movie's violence against its female protagonists and "not feel guilty afterwards".

AllMovie gave the film a negative review complimenting the film's premise, but criticized the film's failure at delivering the "kinky delights" it promised, slow pacing, and lack of character development, calling the film an "amateurish mess of sex fantasy and nuclear horror".

In his book Serial Killer Cinema: An Analytical Filmography (2007), Robert Cettl describes Terror Circus as being within the same "Southern Gothic, almost apocalyptic horror-humour vein" as Three on a Meathook (1972), The Texas Chainsaw Massacre (1974), Eaten Alive (1976), The Hills Have Eyes (1977), and Tourist Trap (1979). As Cettl writes, this sub-genre seeks to "subvert traditional family values, a subtext in many of the more initially disreputable horror films of the 1970s." For Rudolph, the grotesque father and son duo works as a "supposedly startling attack on Patriarchy," and Cettl suggests that the absence of a mother figure might serve a "symbolic feminist gesture" within the context of second-wave feminism. In its depiction of naked women and the violence enacted upon them, he likens the film to the "truly nauseating" The Incredible Torture Show (1976).

In his book Terror in the Desert: Dark Cinema of the American Southwest (2018), writer Brad Sykes notes that the circus compound in which the film is set, "with its tattered circus posters and neglected cages, is one of the most powerful examples of rural isolation ever presented in a desert terror film."

Filmink noted "the movie has two recurring features of Rudolph’s later work: (a) the cast loved working with him, and (b) the film would have been more fun if it had been trashier. It’s not without its charms, though."

=== Home media ===
The film was first released on DVD by Legend House, LLC on January 29, 2008. It was later re-released by Shriek Show and Code Red on March 31, 2009 and September 27, 2011, respectively, with Code Red releasing the film as a double feature alongside the 1981 horror film Scream under its Barn of the Naked Dead title. Code Red released the film on Blu-ray on October 20, 2015, available exclusively through Screen Archives Entertainment's online store. Code Red reissued the film on Blu-ray in conjunction with Kino Lorber on July 12, 2022.

== Sources ==
- Allon, Yoram; Cullen, Del; Patterson, Hannah, eds. (2002). Contemporary North American Film Directors: A Wallflower Critical Guide. London, England: Wallflower Press. ISBN 978-1-903-36452-9.
- Everman, Welch D. (2000). Cult Horror Films: From Attack of the 50 Foot Woman to Zombies of Mora Tau. Secaucus, New Jersey: Citadel Press. ISBN 978-0-806-51425-3.
- Hannan, Brian (2018). In Theaters Everywhere: A History of the Hollywood Wide Release, 1913-2017. Jefferson, North Carolina: McFarland. ISBN 978-1-476-67414-8.
- LoBrutto, Vincent (2021). The Seventies: The Decade That Changed American Film Forever. Lanham, Maryland: Rowman & Littlefield. ISBN 978-1-538-13719-2.
- Sykes, Brad (2018). Terror in the Desert: Dark Cinema of the American Southwest. Jefferson, North Carolina: McFarland. ISBN 978-1-476-63132-5.
