= Lies and Lullabies =

- DVD cover
- Genre: Drama
- Written by: Janet Heaney; Matthew Eisen; Joe S. Landon
- Directed by: Rod Hardy
- Starring: Susan Dey; Piper Laurie; Lorraine Toussaint; D.W. Moffett; Lisa Rieffel; Kathleen York; Allyce Beasley
- Theme music composer: Johnny Harris
- Country of origin: United States
- Original language: English

Production
- Executive producers: Les Alexander; Don Enright
- Producers: Susan Dey; Harvey Kahn; Barbara Gale
- Cinematography: David Connell
- Editor: James Mitchell
- Running time: 94 minutes
- Production companies: Alexander/Enright & Associates; Hearst Entertainment; Front Street Pictures; Susan Dey Productions

Original release
- Network: ABC
- Release: March 14, 1993

Lies and Lullabies is a Rod Hardy-directed 1993 ABC television movie about a pregnant cocaine addict, played by Susan Dey. The film was released on DVD as Sad Inheritance in 2005 and is also sometimes known as Love, Lies and Lullabies.

== Plot ==
Christina is the adult daughter of an alcoholic. A habitual cocaine user, she continues to abuse the drug after she becomes pregnant by her boyfriend. When the baby is born addicted, she is kept away from Christina based on the recommendation of a social worker, who deems her an unfit mother. Christina, distraught, battles to end her addiction and regain custody of her baby.

== History ==
The script for Lies and Lullabies initially cast Dey as the sister of a closet-cocaine addict who dies during childbirth. Dey's character was then charged with raising the baby, ignorant to the developmental delays that would follow. However, after visiting a treatment facility and meeting mothers who were in the process of seeking treatment to regain custody of their children, Dey (who also acted as the producer of the film), asked that the script be rewritten. Speaking to The Post and Courier, she stated that early in the production, "we all had very little compassion for these women," but that after meeting them they learned "the reality is that these women can be helped and if given a chance for treatment and a choice between drugs and their children, many choose their children."

== Cast ==
- Susan Dey as Christina Kinsey
- Lorraine Toussaint as Florence Crawford
- D.W. Moffett as Gabriel
- Piper Laurie as Margaret Kinsey
- Lisa Rieffel as Rachel
- Kathleen York as Terry
- Guy Boyd as Walter
- Andy Romano as Judge Windt
- Lawrence Monoson as Christopher Bentlage
- Allyce Beasley as Cindy
- A.J. Johnson as Grandpa Simmington
- Tim Kelleher as Duke Gibson-Lampiassi
- Neal Lerner as Victor
- Sondra Blake as Mrs. Sweetser
- Brandon Hammond as Kenny
- María Díaz as Sandra
- Yvette Cruise as Sadie
- Ashley Gardner as Fran
- Mary Anne McGarry as Pediatrician
- Paul Perri as Dr. Boardman
- Liz Vassey as Chloe
- Gigi Bermingham as Kim
- Perla Walter as Sadie's Mother
- Jeanne Mori as Nurse
- Carrie Stauber as Nurse
- Brandon Hammond as Kenny
- Jennifer Gertsman as Nurse
- Ace Mask as Clerk
- Bernardo Rosa Jr. as Sadie's Husband
- Ericka Bryce as Party Girl
- Amber Adelmann as Orphan girl
