= Dance with Me, Henry =

1956 American film directed by Charles Barton

- Theatrical release poster
- Directed by: Charles Barton
- Written by: Devery Freeman
- Story by: William Kozlenko; László Kardos (as Leslie Kardos)
- Produced by: Bob Goldstein
- Starring: Bud Abbott; Lou Costello; Gigi Perreau; Rusty Hamer; Mary Wickes
- Cinematography: George Robinson
- Edited by: Robert Golden
- Music by: Paul Dunlap
- Production company: Robert Goldstein Productions
- Distributed by: United Artists
- Release date: December 14, 1956
- Running time: 80 minutes
- Country: United States
- Language: English
- Budget: $450,000

Dance with Me, Henry is a 1956 American comedy film directed by Charles Barton and starring Abbott and Costello and Gigi Perreau. It is the final film that they starred in together, although Costello starred in one more film before his death, The 30 Foot Bride of Candy Rock.

== Plot ==
Lou Henry is the owner of Kiddyland, an amusement park, and Bud Flick is his friend and partner. Together they share a home with two orphan children, Duffer and Shelly. Welfare worker Miss Mayberry does not think that their home is a suitable environment for the children and attempts to remove them. One of the reasons is that Bud is a gambler and owes $10,000 to Big Frank, who offers to forget the debt if Bud agrees to help launder $200,000 that Big Frank took from a Chicago bank. Bud agrees to meet Big Frank's man, Mushie, at Kiddyland to pick up the money and a plane ticket. Lou, however, informs District Attorney Proctor of the plan and he arrives at Kiddyland during Bud and Mushie's meeting. Mushie sees the DA and hides the money just before he murders Proctor and frames Lou for it. Miss Mayberry uses Lou's arrest as a reason to take the children from his home.

Bud informs Mushie that he knows that he really killed Proctor, and Mushie threatens to kill him. However, Big Frank and Dutch kill Mushie. They kidnap Bud and demand that he tell them where the money is hidden. Meanwhile, Lou is released by the police, who believe that he will lead them to Bud. Dutch then kidnaps Lou and takes him to their hideout, where Bud is also being held. Bud lies and tells Big Frank that he knows where the money is and they all head to Kiddyland, with the police following them every step of the way. Bud then tricks Big Frank into confessing to everything while they are inside the park's recording booth, after which Lou grabs the recording and escapes into the park. Shelly and Duffer have also escaped from Miss Mayberry and are now inside the park playing when they see Lou being chased. They return to the orphanage to get help from the other children, and they all head back to Kiddyland. The children then wreak havoc in the park, foiling the gangsters at every turn. The police capture them, and the reward money that Bud and Lou receive is donated to the orphanage. Miss Mayberry, seeing what a good role model Lou really is, returns custody of the orphans to him.

== Cast ==
=== Main ===
- Bud Abbott as Bud Flick
- Lou Costello as Lou Henry
- Gigi Perreau as Shelley
  - Marni Nixon as Shelley (singing voice)
- Rusty Hamer as Duffer
- Mary Wickes as Miss Mayberry

=== Supporting ===
- Ted de Corsia as Big Frank
- Ron Hargrave as Ernie the ukulele player
- Frank Wilcox as Father Mullahy
- Sherry Alberoni as Bootsie
- Eddie Marr as Garvey
- Richard Reeves as Mushie
- Robert Shayne as Proctor
- Walter Reed as Drake
- Paul Sorensen as Dutch

=== Uncredited ===
- Robert Bice as Policeman
- John Cliff as Knucks
- Phil Garris as Mickey
- Jess Kirkpatrick as Policeman
- David McMahon as Savoldi
- Gilman Rankin as McKay
- Rod Williams as Janitor

== Production ==
Dance with Me, Henry was filmed from May 23 through June 22, 1956. It was Abbott and Costello's 36th feature film and their first after being dropped by Universal Pictures in 1955 following the completion of Abbott and Costello Meet the Mummy. Independent film producer Bob Goldstein hired the duo for this film, which was released through United Artists. It turned out to be the last film that Abbott and Costello made together as a team, as they ended their partnership in July 1957. The film's title was taken from the 1955 Etta James song "The Wallflower (Dance with Me, Henry)", although the film's plot has nothing to do with the song.

During filming, Abbott and Costello's routine Who's on First? was inducted into the National Baseball Hall of Fame in Cooperstown, New York, where a clip still runs continuously.

A bit part in the film went to the "just released from contract" Mouseketeer Sherry Allen, who was advised by Lou Costello to return to the use (professionally) of her true surname, "Alberoni". She took his advice, and has been known professionally since that time by her birth name.

== Release ==
Dance with Me, Henry received mixed reviews when it was released theatrically in December 1956. A.H. Weiler, reviewing the film for The New York Times, complained: "it is perfectly clear that any attempt to lend dramatic dimension to the simple and egregious fantasy expected of an Abbott and Costello venture can be fraught with the makings of a loud backfire." The New York Herald Tribune was more conciliatory, noting "this time, the team is more sedate" while praising Costello for eschewing slapstick comedy and "developing along the lines of a Chaplinesque character."

In 1956, during Ralph Edwards' This Is Your Life show on NBC which featured a retrospective of Lou Costello's life, the comedy team mentioned the recent release of this film.

== Home media ==
Dance with Me, Henry was released on DVD in June 2005 by MGM Entertainment. It was released a second time on DVD, as well as on Blu-ray, on June 21, 2015.
