= Hook a Crook =

- Directed by: Jules White; Abner Singer
- Written by: Felix Adler; Jules White
- Produced by: Jules White
- Starring: Joe Besser; Hawthorne; Lela Bliss; Barbara Bartay; Tom Kennedy; Dudley Dickerson; Dan Blocker; Steve Calvert; Ray Corrigan; Joe Palma; Eddie Baker
- Cinematography: Ray Cory; Henry Freulich
- Edited by: Harold White; Edwin Bryant
- Distributed by: Columbia Pictures
- Release date: November 24, 1955 (U.S.)
- Running time: 16:03
- Country: United States
- Language: English

Hook a Crook is a 1955 short subject directed by Jules White starring American comedian Joe Besser and radio DJ Jim Hawthorne (billed as "Hawthorne"). It is the ninth entry in the Joe Besser series released by Columbia Pictures starring the comedian, who appeared in ten comedies at the studio between 1949 and 1956.

== Plot ==
A gorilla escapes from the local zoo and prowls the city rooftops, enters Mrs. Van Sickle's (Lela Bliss) apartment, and steals her diamond necklace. Wide Awake Detective Agency investigators Besser and Hawthorne answer the call for help, and trail the suspect to an antique dealer's offices in the same building. Thinking it may be a disguised thief, the duo confront the giant primate just as two antique thieves (Joe Palma, Eddie Baker) enter the scene.

== Production notes ==
Hook a Crook is a remake of the 1951 film 'Fraidy Cat, itself a scene-for-scene remake of the 1943 Three Stooges film Dizzy Detectives. Both films utilized a considerable amount of stock footage. Jules White directed all three films.

== Plot ==
A gorilla, who has been trained to commit crimes, is terrorizing the city. It also has stolen jewelry from a socialite, so she calls two detectives (Besser and Hawthorne) to track down the gorilla. They eventually find him in an antique store in an office building, where two criminals, who are responsible for the gorilla's criminal behavior, are waiting for them. They subdue the two men and retrieve the stolen jewelry.

== Notes ==
- This was a remake of two shorts Dizzy Detectives (1943) and 'Fraidy Cat (1951).
- The original working title was Daffy Detectives.
