= Deadly Love =

- Australian VHS cover
- Genre: Action; Horror; Thriller
- Written by: Rob Gilmer; Sherry Gottlieb
- Directed by: Jorge Montesi
- Starring: Susan Dey; Stephen McHattie; Jean LeClerc
- Theme music composer: Micky Erbe; Maribeth Solomon
- Country of origin: United States
- Original language: English

Production
- Producers: Les Alexander; Don Enright; Clara George; David N. Gottlieb; Julian Marks
- Editor: Pia Di Ciaula
- Running time: 104 minutes
- Production company: ABC Productions

Original release
- Network: Lifetime
- Release: October 16, 1995

Deadly Love is a 1995 Lifetime Original Movie starring Susan Dey as a lonely vampire photographer. The film was based on the book Love Bites by Sherry Gottlieb and co-stars Stephen McHattie.

== Plot ==
Rebecca Barnes (Susan Dey) is a successful photographer who has it all—including the curse of vampiric immortality. Longing for companionship, Barnes leaves a disastrous trail of blood-less bodies in her wake. Shockingly, photographs that she snapped of one of the victims brings Rebecca into the police investigation and into the arms of Detective Sean O'Connor (Stephen McHattie). As the passion between Sean and Rebecca mounts, so does the evidence against her.

== Cast ==
- Susan Dey ... Rebecca Barnes
- Stephen McHattie ... Sean O'Connor
- Eric Peterson ... Elliott
- Julie Khaner ... Poole
- Robert S. Woods ... Jim King
- Jean LeClerc ... Trombitas Dracu
- David Ferry ... Sal Consentino
- Roman Podhora ... Steve Merritt
- Henry Alessandroni ... Forman
- Kelly Fiddick ... Griffith
- Suzanne Coy ... Rita Berwald
- Jim Codrington ... Derek Green
- Bernard Browne ... Cab Driver
- Kevin Le Roy ... Firebreather
