= Brian Forster =

American actor (born 1960)

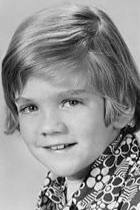
- Forster, c. 1968
- Born: Brian A. Forster; April 14, 1960 (age 66); Los Angeles, California, U.S.
- Occupations: Actor, race car driver
- Years active: 1969–1977, 2008

Brian A. Forster (born April 14, 1960) is an American former child actor and racing car driver. He is best known as the second actor to play the role of Chris Partridge in the television series The Partridge Family.

== Biography ==
Forster was born in Los Angeles, the son of English-born actors Jennifer Raine and Peter Forster and, through his mother, a great-great-great-grandson of Charles Dickens. He is also the stepson of actor Whit Bissell and stepgrandson of actor Alan Napier, who portrayed Alfred the Butler in the Batman television series (1966–1968).

Forster joined The Partridge Family in 1971, replacing Jeremy Gelbwaks, and continued until the show ended in 1974. Chris Partridge was the drummer of the fictional family band. He also voiced Chris in the 1974 Saturday morning cartoon Partridge Family 2200 A.D. As of 2002/2003, Forster was a racing car driver in northern California, and continued to act in community theater there.

== Filmography ==
| Year | Title | Role | Notes |
|---|---|---|---|
| 1969 | How We Feel About Sound | Clancy (voice) | Educational film |
| 1969 | The Brady Bunch | The Elf | Episode: "Eenie, Meenie, Mommy, Daddy" |
| 1969 | Family Affair | Boy | Episode: "What's Funny About a Broken Leg?" |
| 1971–74 | The Partridge Family | Chris Partridge | 71 episodes |
| 1973 | Goober and the Ghost Chasers | Chris Partridge (voice) | 8 episodes |
| 1974–75 | Partridge Family 2200 A.D. | Chris Partridge (voice) | 16 episodes |
| 1977–78 | Fred Flintstone and Friends | Chris Partridge (voice) | segment: The Partridge Family in Outer Space |
| 1977 | Thanksgiving Reunion with The Partridge Family and My Three Sons | Himself | TV special |
| 2008 | Break a Leg | Chris Partridge | episode: "Ghosts, Mimes & Partridges" |
