= Sisters of Death =

- DVD cover
- Directed by: Joseph Mazzuca
- Written by: Peter Arnold; Elwyn Richards
- Produced by: Gary L. Messenger; Gustaf Unger
- Starring: Arthur Franz; Claudia Jennings
- Cinematography: Grady Martin
- Release dates: April 16, 1976; (San Antonio, TX)
- Running time: 87 minutes
- Country: United States
- Language: English

Sisters of Death (aka Death Trap) is a 1976 American mystery slasher film written by Peter Arnold and Elwyn Richards, and directed by Joseph Mazzuca. The film stars Arthur Franz and Claudia Jennings. Seven years after a sorority member is killed during a game of russian roulette, the victim's father lures the remaining sisters to his estate where he begins killing them.

Sisters of Death was theatrically released in 1976, though it was filmed in 1972.

== Plot ==
During an all-girl secret society college initiation, one of the new members is killed. Seven years later, the survivors are invited to a college reunion at a lavish estate, which turns out to be owned by the crazed father of the girl who died. He reveals to the girls that one them witnessed foul play and is helping him. The girls then run off screaming and try to leave, but he turns on the electric fence that surrounds the property, trapping them. The girls and the two hired men that drove them there start getting killed off one by one until there are only two survivors.

== Cast ==
- Arthur Franz as Edmond Clybourn
- Claudia Jennings as Judy
- Cheri Howell as Sylvia
- Sherry Boucher as Diana
- Paul Carr as Mark
- Joe E. Tata as Joe
- Sherry Alberoni as Francie
- Roxanne Albee as Penny
- Elizabeth Bergen as Liz
- Paul Fierro as Mexican
- Vern Mathison as Police Officer

== Release ==
The film was released theatrically in the United States by First American Films in 1976, but was filmed in 1972. It was also released as Death Trap.

The film was released as a downloadable Video on Demand by Rifftrax on April 25, 2014. The release included a running, mocking, commentary by Mike Nelson, Kevin Murphy and Bill Corbett, formerly of Mystery Science Theater 3000.
