= Suzanne Crough =

American actress (1963–2015)

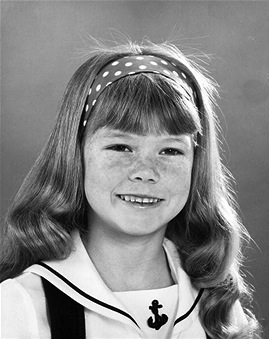
- Crough, c. 1970
- Born: March 6, 1963; Fullerton, California, U.S.
- Died: April 27, 2015 (aged 52); Laughlin, Nevada, U.S.
- Occupation: Actress
- Years active: 1970–1980
- Spouse: William Condray (m. 1985–2015)
- Children: 2

Suzanne J. Crough (March 6, 1963 – April 27, 2015) was an American child actress best known for her role as Tracy Partridge on The Partridge Family.

== Career ==
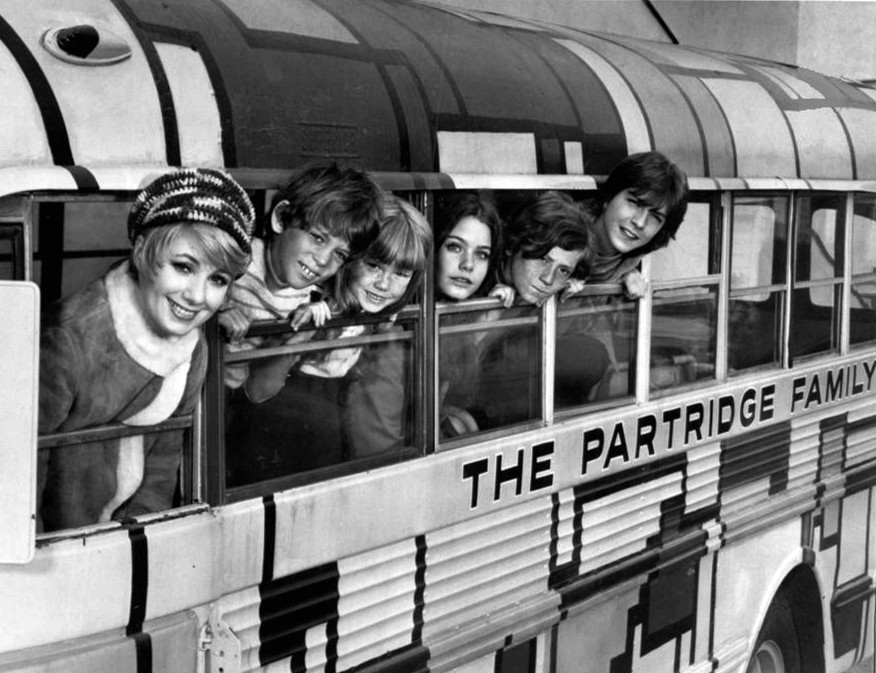
The Partridge Family, season 1. L-R: Shirley Jones, Jeremy Gelbwaks, Suzanne Crough, Susan Dey, Danny Bonaduce and David Cassidy.

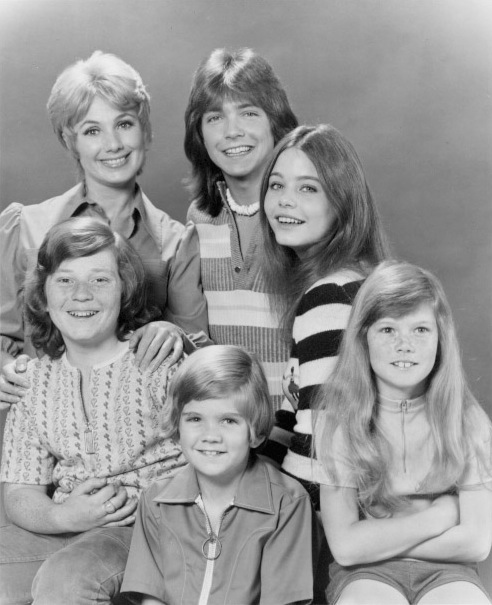
Crough (bottom right) at age 9. She is seen here with fellow cast members of The Partridge Family in 1972

On The Partridge Family, a musical sitcom TV show which ran from 1970 to 1974, Crough played Tracy Partridge, the youngest Partridge sibling, who played the tambourine. She also voiced Tracy in the 1974 Saturday morning cartoon Partridge Family 2200 A.D. After The Partridge Family, she made several TV movies and made guest appearances on television shows during the 1970's, including Mulligan's Stew. Her last credited on-screen role was as Kate in the 1980 TV movie Children of Divorce.

== Post-acting life ==
Crough graduated from Los Angeles Pierce College and until 1993 owned and operated a bookstore. She married William Condray in July 1985; the couple had two daughters.

On March 2, 2010, during a reunion interview with several co-stars from The Partridge Family on The Today Show, she stated she was a manager at an OfficeMax in Bullhead City, Arizona.

== Death ==
Crough died while sitting at her dining room table at her home in Laughlin, Nevada, on April 27, 2015, at the age of 52. The cause of death was not immediately reported, but Las Vegas police issued a statement that it was due to a "medical episode" and was "not suspicious". According to the coroner of Clark County, Nevada, Crough's cause of death was arrhythmogenic right ventricular dysplasia (ARVD), a rare form of cardiomyopathy.

Several of Crough's Partridge Family co-stars paid tribute to her, including Shirley Jones and Danny Bonaduce. Bonaduce lamented, "Everyone thought I'd be the first Partridge to go. Sadly it was little Tracy. Suzanne was a wonderful lady and a good mom. She will be missed."

== Filmography ==
Year	Title	Role	Notes
1970–74	The Partridge Family	Tracy Partridge	96 episodes
1973	Goober and the Ghost Chasers	Tracy Partridge (voice)	8 episodes
1974–75	Partridge Family 2200 A.D.	Tracy Partridge (voice)	16 episodes
1976	Dawn: Portrait of a Teenage Runaway	Runaway	TV film (uncredited role)
1977–78	Fred Flintstone and Friends	Tracy Partridge (voice)	Segment: The Partridge Family in Outer Space
1977	Mulligan's Stew	Stevie Freedman	7 episodes
1977	Thanksgiving Reunion with The Partridge Family and My Three Sons	Herself	TV special
1978	The New Adventures of Wonder Woman	Girl #2	Episode: "My Teenage Idol Is Missing"
1978	Teenage Father	Teenager mother	Short film
1980	Children of Divorce	Kate	TV film
