= Eadie Was a Lady =

1945 film by Arthur Dreifuss

- Directed by: Arthur Dreifuss
- Written by: Monte Brice
- Produced by: Michael Kraike
- Starring: Ann Miller; Joe Besser; William Wright
- Cinematography: Burnett Guffey
- Edited by: James Sweeney
- Music by: Morris Stoloff
- Production company: Columbia Pictures
- Distributed by: Columbia Pictures
- Release date: January 23, 1945 (United States)
- Running time: 67 minutes
- Country: United States
- Language: English

Eadie Was a Lady is a 1945 American musical comedy film directed by Arthur Dreifuss starring Ann Miller, Joe Besser and William Wright. It was produced and distributed by Columbia Pictures.

== Plot ==
Eadie Allen is a student at Glen Moor College and the niece of a wealthy Boston socialite (Aunt Priscilla) in Back Bay. She has secretly taken a new job as a dancer in a seedy burlesque house where her talents are eventually recognized and she is given larger roles on the stage show by the manager, Tommy Foley. At the same time, Eadie is preparing a dance number for the college's annual Greek festival. All of these time conflicts cause her grades to slip, so she pressures Pamela Parker, a classmate, into doing her schoolwork for her. A series of hijinks where Eadie's double life is almost discovered by the dean of the college (Dean Flint) leads her to hand Tommy her resignation from the burlesque bar. Tommy convinces Eadie to perform one last time at a hotel. Catching wind of this, Eadie's jealous and jilted former co-dancer (Rose Allure) arranges for the police to raid the performance. The raid leads to both Eadie and Dean Flint being implicated in participation with the lewd event, and this almost has them expelled from their respective positions in the college. Rose confesses to Tommy that she set up the raid, and so Tommy disguises himself as the head of the Athens Art Theater, "Professor Nozoros." He uses this pretense to defend both the dean and Eadie to the board of director of Glen Moor, by saying that they were at the burlesque performance to perform research for the Greek festival. The ruse works, and Eadie and Dean Flint are exonerated.

== Cast ==
- Ann Miller as Eadie Allen/Edithea Alden
- Joe Besser as Professor Diogenes Dingle
- William Wright as Tommy Foley
- Jeff Donnell as Pamela 'Pepper' Parker
- Jimmy Little as Jim Tuttle
- Marion Martin as Rose Allure
- Kathleen Howard as Aunt Priscilla Alden
- Tom Dugan as Hannegan
- Carla Balenda as Doris (credited as Sally Bliss)
- Hal McIntyre as Orchestra Leader (as Hal McIntyre and His Orchestra)
