= 'Fraidy Cat =

- Directed by: Jules White
- Written by: Felix Adler
- Produced by: Jules White
- Starring: Joe Besser; Hawthorne; Tom Kennedy; Joe Palma; Eddie Baker; Steve Calvert; Ray Corrigan
- Cinematography: Henry Freulich
- Edited by: Edwin Bryant
- Distributed by: Columbia Pictures
- Release date: December 13, 1951 (U.S.)
- Running time: 16:09
- Country: United States
- Language: English

'Fraidy Cat is a 1951 short subject directed by Jules White starring American comedian Joe Besser and radio disc jockey Jim Hawthorne (billed as "Hawthorne"). It is the third entry in the Joe Besser series released by Columbia Pictures starring the comedian, who appeared in ten comedies at the studio between 1949 and 1956.

== Plot ==
Wide Awake Detective Agency investigators Joe and Hawthorne have been unable to solve the antique robberies perpetrated by The Ape Man Gang. Their superior, I. Katchum (Tom Kennedy) gives them one final opportunity to solve the case. Guarding an antique shop late at night, the duo eventually confront the gang of crooks who have trained a real gorilla to carry out the thefts.

== Production notes ==
'Fraidy Cat was filmed on July 23–26, 1951. It is a scene-for-scene remake of the 1943 Three Stooges film Dizzy Detectives using occasional stock footage. 'Fraidy Cat was itself remade in 1955 as Hook a Crook, using stock footage as well. Jules White directed all three films.
