= Sherry Alberoni =

American actress (born 1946)

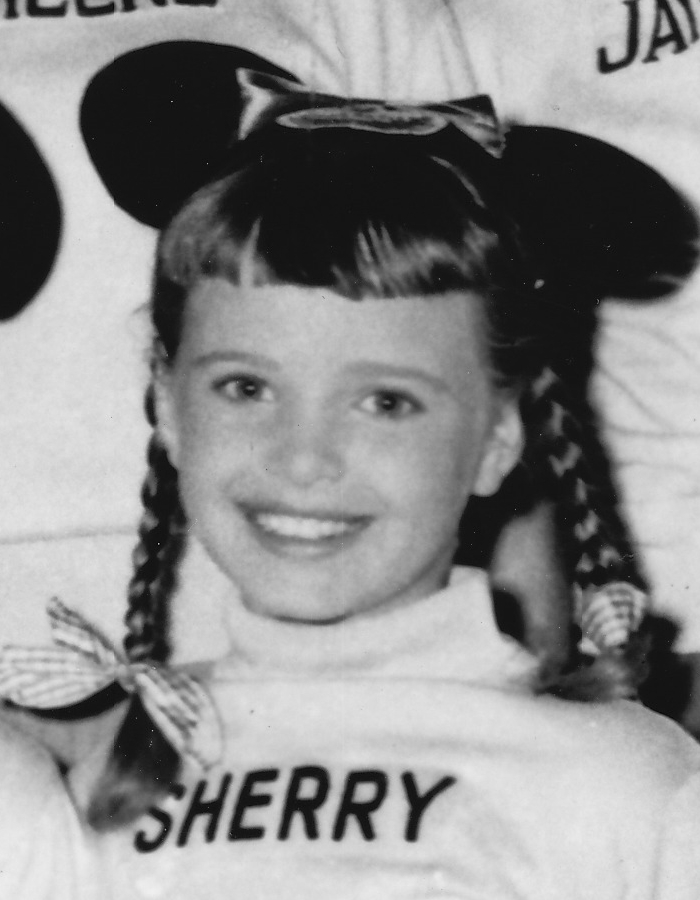
- Sherry Alberoni as a Mousketeer on The Mickey Mouse Club, circa 1956
- Born: December 4, 1946 (age 79); Cleveland, Ohio, U.S.
- Occupation: Actress
- Years active: 1956–1984
- Spouse: Dr. Richard Van Meter (m. 1971)

Sharyn Eileen "Sherry" Alberoni (born December 4, 1946) is a former American child actress. She got her start as a Mouseketeer on the weekday ABC television program The Mickey Mouse Club. As an adult, Alberoni became a voice artist for Hanna-Barbera Productions. Besides providing voices for numerous incidental characters in series such as Jeannie, Alberoni is best known as the voice of nasty rich-girl Alexandra Cabot from Josie and the Pussycats; "superhero-in-training" Wendy from the first season of Super Friends; the heroic robot Bo in Mighty Orbots; and Glumdalclitch in The Three Worlds of Gulliver. In 1971, she starred alongside Patty Andrews in the Sherman Brothers stage musical, Victory Canteen.

== Background ==
Alberoni was born in Cleveland, Ohio, the youngest of three children. After her family moved to California, Alberoni started modeling at age two, and shortly after, took up dancing lessons, joining her older brother Roy. She also learned to play trumpet. Alberoni's biggest hobby was collecting dolls, and by her teenage years she had several hundred.

Alberoni displayed a generosity of spirit that would stay with her throughout her life. She volunteered for charity work, and became so successful at it that she was proclaimed a "Red Feather" girl by the Community Chest. This enabled her to attend opening day at Disneyland in 1955, where she first met Walt Disney.

Both Sherry Alberoni and her brother tried out for the Mouseketeers in the spring of 1956. Roy was up first, and after realizing his chance was slipping away, gallantly volunteered that his little sister could play the trumpet while tap-dancing. The casting judges then called for Alberoni and she performed as advertised, in the process nearly knocking her teeth out. What really got her a spot on the show though was her lisp; director Sidney Miller thought it was hilarious.

Alberoni graduated from Westchester High School in Los Angeles, where she was a straight "A" student.

== Career ==
=== The Mickey Mouse Club ===
Alberoni joined The Mickey Mouse Club as a second season replacement and was assigned to the Blue Team. She had few solo performances in her one season with the club, but was part of many audience scenes for guest stars and circus acts. She had a long show business career as an adult, including voice work for cartoons.

At age nine, Sherry Alberoni was the youngest Mouseketeer for the show's second season. She used the stage name Sherry Allen upon the advice of her first agent, who thought some casting directors might not hire an ethnic talent. Episodes from the second season are unavailable for viewing today, as the studio hasn't released production numbers from that year on video or DVD.

Though normally assigned to the Blue Team for Circus Day and Guest Star Day audiences, Alberoni was also given roles in several Anything Can Happen Day numbers. She recalled in later years that director Sidney Miller would often change her lines to include many sibilants, so fond was he of hearing her lisp.

=== Other activities ===
Alberoni played Midge Beamer in The Ed Wynn Show and Debbie Potter in The Tom Ewell Show (1960–1961). She also provided the voices of Laurie Partridge in Partridge Family 2200 A.D. and Wendy in Super Friends.

Alberoni appeared in the film Dance with Me, Henry, the last Abbott and Costello picture. Lou Costello advised Alberoni to stick with her original last name. She followed that up with guest appearances on Bronco before going to Europe in 1960 to make The Three Worlds of Gulliver (in which she played the character Glumdalclitch). In 1962 her brother Roy founded a professional combo called The Rhythmaires, for which Alberoni was the lead vocalist.

Throughout the 1960s Sherry Alberoni appeared on episodes of many television series, such as The Donna Reed Show, The Farmer's Daughter, Ripcord, My Three Sons, The Man from UNCLE, and The Monkees, while also doing bit parts in minor films. Her biggest recurring television role was as Sharon James on Family Affair (1966–71). Alberoni also took a regular part in entertaining Marines at Camp Pendleton during these same years for a monthly production called "The JeanLondon Show". It was also in the late sixties that she began doing voice work for animated series, like Josie and the Pussycats, Super Friends, and in 1984, Mighty Orbots. She also is credited with dubbing in Patty Duke's singing voice for Duke's character, Neely O'Hara, in the 1967 release Valley of the Dolls. During the seventies she also featured in two horror films, Nightmare Circus (1974) and Sisters of Death (1976).

In 1980 Alberoni took part in the televised Mouseketeer Reunion, and for once got a chance to tap dance with the Red Team. Sherry took part in the Mouseketeer live performances at Disneyland in the 1980s, and also became a fixture on Mouseketeer personal appearance tours during the late 1980s and 1990s, often teaming with Bobby Burgess.

== Personal life ==
Alberoni has been married to Dr. Richard Van Meter since 1971. The couple has two adult daughters and four grandchildren, and resides in Southern California. Throughout her life, she has done volunteer work for charities.

== Filmography ==
Film
Year	Title	Role	Notes
1956	Dance with Me, Henry	Bootsie	Film
1960	Pay or Die	Giulia De Sarno	Film
1960	The 3 Worlds of Gulliver	Glumdalclitch	Film
1966	Cyborg 2087	Laura Zellar	Film
1974	Nightmare Circus	Sheri	Film
1976	Sisters of Death	Francie	Film
Television
Year	Title	Role	Notes
1960	The Real McCoys	Mary Lou	
1960–61	The Tom Ewell Show	Debbie Potter	Series regular (32 episodes)
1966	My Three Sons	Nan Summers	1 episode
1966	The Monkees	Leslie	S1:E9, "The Chaperone"
1966–69	Family Affair	Sharon James	9 episodes
1970–72	Josie and the Pussycats	Alexandra Cabot (voice)	16 episodes
1972–74	Josie and the Pussycats in Outer Space	Alexandra Cabot (voice)	16 episodes
1973	The ABC Saturday Superstar Movie	Deanna Carmichael (voice)	Episode: "Lost in Space"
1973	The New Scooby-Doo Movies	Alexandra Cabot (voice)	Episode: "The Haunted Showboat"
1973	Jeannie	Additional voices	16 episodes
1973	Super Friends	Wendy Harris / Polly Lean / Museum Patron (voice)	16 episodes
1974–75	Partridge Family 2200 A.D.	Laurie Partridge (voice)	14 episodes
1977–78	Fred Flintstone and Friends	Laurie Partridge, Additional voices	95 episodes
1984	Mighty Orbots	Bo (voice)	13 episodes
