= Joe Besser =

American actor and comedian (1907–1988)

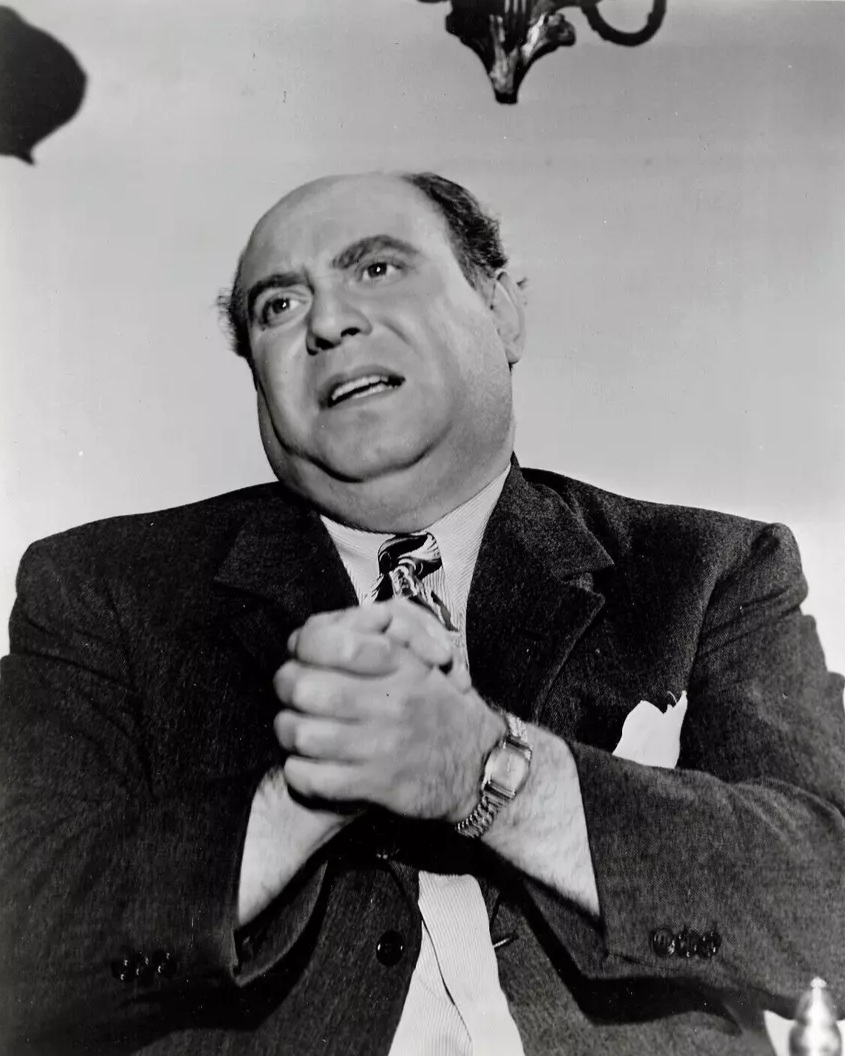
- Besser, circa 1950s
- Born: Jessel Besser; August 12, 1907; St. Louis, Missouri, U.S.
- Died: March 1, 1988 (aged 80); North Hollywood, California, U.S.
- Resting place: Forest Lawn Memorial Park, Glendale, California, U.S.
- Occupations: Actor; comedian; musician
- Years active: 1938–1988
- Spouse: Erna Kay (m. 1932)
- Family: Matt Besser (first cousin twice removed)
- Website: www.joebesserforever.com

Joe Besser (born Jessel Besser; August 12, 1907 – March 1, 1988) was an American actor and comedian known for his impish humor and wimpy characters. He is best known for his brief stint as a member of The Three Stooges from 1957 to 1959. He is also remembered for his television roles: Stinky, the bratty man-child on The Abbott and Costello Show, and Jillson, the maintenance man on The Joey Bishop Show.

== Early life ==
Besser was born in St. Louis, Missouri, on August 12, 1907. He was the ninth child of Morris and Fanny [Fecht] Besser, Jewish immigrants from Eastern Europe. He had seven older sisters and an older brother, Manny, who was in show business, primarily as a Jewish comic. From an early age, Joe was fascinated with show business, especially the magic act of Howard Thurston that visited St. Louis annually. When Joe was 12, Thurston allowed him to be an audience plant. Besser was so excited by this that he sneaked into Thurston's train after the St. Louis run of the show and was discovered the next day in Detroit sleeping on top of the lion's cage.

Thurston informed Besser's parents of the situation and trained him as an assistant. The first act involved pulling a rabbit out of a hat. The trick involved two rabbits, one hidden in a pocket of Thurston's cape. But young Besser was so nervous that he botched it badly, pulling out the rabbit from the cape at the same time the other rabbit was on display, before the trick had been performed. The audience roared with laughter, and Besser from then on was assigned "comic mishap" roles only. Besser was placed by St. Louis juvenile authorities in a "corrective school" (reform school) at age 12.

== Acting career ==
Besser remained in show business and developed a comic character: an impish but whiny and bratty man who was easily excitable and upset, throwing temper tantrums with little provocation. Besser, with his frequent outbursts of "You crazy, youuuuu!" and "Not so faaaaaast!" or "Not so haaard!!" became a vaudeville headliner, and movie and radio appearances soon followed.

The comedy team of Olsen and Johnson, whose Broadway revues were fast-paced collections of songs and blackouts, hired Joe Besser to join their Broadway show Sons o' Fun. He appeared in five sketches, including one as the sissified "Cowboy Joe". Besser's noisy intrusions fit the Olsen & Johnson style perfectly, and Besser's work caught the attention of the Shubert brothers, who signed Besser to a theatrical contract. Columbia Pictures hired Besser away from the Shuberts, and Besser relocated to Hollywood in 1944, where he brought his comic character to feature-length musical comedies like Hey, Rookie and Eadie Was a Lady (1945). On May 9, 1946, Besser appeared on the pioneering NBC television program Hour Glass, performing his "Army Drill" routine with stage partner Jimmy Little. According to an article in the May 27, 1946 issue of Life magazine, the show was seen by about 20,000 people on about 3,500 television sets, mostly in the New York City area. During this period, he appeared on the Jack Benny radio program in the episode entitled "Jack Prepares For Carnegie Hall" in June, 1943. Besser's persona was sufficiently well known that he was frequently caricatured in Looney Tunes animated shorts of the era. He appeared in the action film The Desert Hawk (1950).

Besser had substituted for Lou Costello on radio, opposite Bud Abbott, and by the 1950s he was firmly established as one of the Abbott and Costello regulars. When the duo filmed The Abbott and Costello Show for television, they hired Joe Besser to play Oswald "Stinky" Davis, a bratty, loudmouthed child dressed in an oversized Little Lord Fauntleroy outfit, shorts, and a flat-top hat with an overhanging brim. He appeared during the first season of The Abbott and Costello Show. Besser was cast for the role of Yonkel, a chariot man, in the low-budget biblical film Sins of Jezebel (1953), which starred Paulette Goddard as the titular wicked queen.

=== The Three Stooges ===
In 1949 Jules White, who produced the Three Stooges comedies for Columbia, hired Joe Besser to star in his own two-reel comedies. Ten Besser shorts were released over eight years, four of the films teaming Besser with radio comedian Jim Hawthorne.

On November 22, 1955, Shemp Howard of the Three Stooges died at the age of 60 of a massive cerebral hemorrhage while on his way home from a boxing exhibition. Columbia had promised theater owners eight Stooge comedies into the 1956 season, and only four were completed when Shemp died. To fulfill the contract, producer-director Jules White manufactured four more films with Shemp's surviving partners, Moe Howard and Larry Fine, working as a two-man team (with Shemp seen entirely in older film footage). After the last four films were completed, Larry suggested that he and Moe could continue working as "The Two Stooges." Studio chief Harry Cohn rejected the proposal. Although Moe had legal approval to allow new members into the act, Columbia executives had the final say about any actor who would appear in the studio's films and insisted on a performer already under contract to Columbia. At the time, Joe Besser was one of a few comedians still making comedy shorts at the studio, his last one being released in 1956. He successfully renegotiated his contract and was paid his former feature-film salary, which was more than the other Stooges earned.

Besser refrained from imitating Curly or Shemp. He continued to play the same whiny character he had developed over his long career. He had a clause in his contract that prohibited being hit excessively. Besser recalled, "I usually played the kind of character who would hit others back." He claimed that Larry volunteered to take the brunt of Moe's screen abuse. In a 2002 E! channel program that used file footage of Besser, the comic stated that the left side of Larry Fine's face was noticeably coarser than the other side, which he attributed to Moe's slaps.

As a result of his whiny persona and lack of true slapstick punishment against him (a cornerstone of Stooge humor), Joe has been less popular with contemporary Stooge aficionados, so much so that "Stooge-a-Polooza" TV host Rich Koz has even apologized on the air before showing Besser shorts; during the show's tenure, he received more than a few letters from viewers expressing their outrage over his airing them. Besser does have his defenders, however. Columbia historians Edward Watz and Ted Okuda have written appreciatively of Besser for bringing new energy to what was by then a flagging theatrical series.

The Stooges shorts with Besser were filmed from the spring of 1956 to the end of 1957. His Stooge tenure ended when Columbia shut down the two-reel comedy department on December 20, 1957. Jules White had shot enough film for 16 comedies (two years' worth of releases), which were issued a few months apart until June 1959, with Sappy Bull Fighters being the final release.

After Besser joined the team, for the first time in their career, the Stooges did not make any personal appearances during their layoff season, which began in 1956. There was a longtime belief, based on an existing ad, that the Stooges once performed live, with Besser as the third stooge, at the Paramount Theatre, Los Angeles, some time around 1957. It was later found that the ad was erroneously used for the act's personal appearances in December 1959, with Joe DeRita, rather than Besser, as part of the lineup. In fact, Besser never made any personal appearances as a member of the Three Stooges.

After their contract with Columbia ended, Moe Howard and Larry Fine discussed plans for a personal appearance tour, but Besser declined. His wife had suffered a heart attack in November 1957, and he was unwilling to leave without her. In later life, Besser praised Moe and Larry in a 1985 radio interview, from which a quote was aired on A&E Network's Biography. Besser said:

... Moe and Larry, they were the best. I enjoyed every minute of it with them. In fact, to show you how wonderful they were, I never liked to be hit with anything. And Larry would always say to me, 'Don't worry, Joe, I'll take it.' Now that's the kind of guys that they were ...

Besser was ultimately replaced as third Stooge by Curly Joe DeRita.

=== After the Stooges ===
Besser returned to films and television, most notably as the superintendent Jillson for four seasons (1961–1965) of The Joey Bishop Show. He also made occasional appearances on the ABC late-night series, also called The Joey Bishop Show, between 1967 and 1969. Besser also had roles on The Mothers-in-Law, Batman, The Good Guys, That Girl, and Love, American Style. He provided the voice of the dragon on The Alvin Show (1961), and he played Chubby Stone in the episode "Cry Love, Cry Murder" (S3 E25) of the private-eye series Peter Gunn (1961).

Besser also provided voices for several Saturday morning cartoon series in the 1970s. He voiced the character Putty Puss in The Houndcats (1972), bumbling genie Babu in Jeannie (1973), (inspired by I Dream of Jeannie) and Scooby's All-Star Laff-A-Lympics, and as Scare Bear in Yogi's Space Race (1978). Besser's career slowed somewhat after he suffered a minor stroke in 1979, resulting in considerable weight loss. His last role was in The Smurfs in 1983.

In 1984, Besser co-wrote his autobiography with authors Jeff and Greg Lenburg, Not Just a Stooge. The title reflected Besser's dismay that people only recognized him for his brief tenure with the Stooges, and not for his long career as a solo comedian. However, he eventually softened, realizing that the Stooges continued to bring him his greatest exposure. The book would be retitled and republished as Once a Stooge, Always a Stooge following his death in 1988.

Joe Besser recalled his friendship with the Stooges in an emotional speech, referring to "the four boys [Moe, Larry, Curly, and Shemp] ... up in heaven" looking down at the dedication of a star to The Three Stooges on the Hollywood Walk of Fame on August 30, 1983. Stooges co-actor Emil Sitka, the only other Stooge attendee, also spoke; the only other surviving Stooge, Joe DeRita, was ill at the time, though he outlived Besser by five years.

In the spring of 2000, ABC aired a made-for-television movie The Three Stooges, with actor Laurence Coy appearing briefly as Besser. This depiction of Besser has been criticized as being unfairly negative.

== Personal life ==
In 1932, Besser married dancer Erna Kay (born Ernestine Dora Kretschmer), known as "Ernie". The couple had no children. They were neighbors and friends of Lou Costello, of the Abbott and Costello duo. Besser appeared in the Abbott and Costello movie Africa Screams (1949), which also featured Shemp Howard of the Three Stooges. Joe and Shemp were old friends, having met in 1932.

His cousin's grandson is Upright Citizens Brigade theater co-founder and improviser/comedian Matt Besser.

== Death ==
Joe Besser died of heart failure on March 1, 1988, at the age of 80. His wife Erna died on July 1, 1989, from a heart attack at age 89. Both spouses are buried in the same plot in the Forest Lawn Memorial Park Cemetery in Glendale, California.

== Selected filmography ==
=== Theatrical ===
==== Features ====
- Hot Steel (1940) – Siggie
- Hey, Rookie (1944) – Pendelton
- Eadie Was a Lady (1945) – Professor Dingle
- Talk About a Lady (1946) – Roly Q. Entwhistle
- Feudin', Fussin' and A-Fightin (1948) – Sharkey Dolan
- Africa Screams (1949) – Harry
- Joe Palooka Meets Humphrey (1950) – Carlton
- Outside the Wall (1950) – Cook (uncredited)
- Woman in Hiding (1950) – Salesman
- The Desert Hawk (1950) – Prince Sinbad
- I, the Jury (1953) – Elevator Operator
- Sins of Jezebel (1953) – Yonkel
- Abbott and Costello Meet the Keystone Kops (1955) – Hunter (uncredited)
- Headline Hunters (1955) – Coroner
- Two-Gun Lady (1955) – Doc McGinnis
- Say One for Me (1959) – Joe Greb
- Let's Make Love (1960) – Charlie Lamont
- The Silent Call (1961) – Art
- The Errand Boy (1961) – Man watching rushes
- Hand of Death (1962) – Service station attendant
- The Monk (1969) – Herbie (TV movie)
- Savage Intruder (1970) – Bus Driver
- Which Way to the Front? (1970) – Dock Master

==== Short subjects ====
- Cuckoorancho (1938) – Wanderer
- A Day in the Country (1953, filmed in 3-D)
- The Three Stooges (1957–1959)
- The Woodcutter's House (1959)

==== Joe Besser (* with Hawthorne) short-subject series ====
- Waiting in the Lurch (1949) – Eric Loudermilk Potts
- Dizzy Yardbird (1950) – Rodney Marblehead
- 'Fraidy Cat (1951) * – Det. Joe Besser
- Aim, Fire, Scoot (1952) * – Pvt. Joe Besser
- Caught on the Bounce (1952) – Daddy
- Spies and Guys (1953) – Pvt. Joe Besser
- The Fire Chaser (1954) – Eric Loudermilk Potts (remake of Waiting in the Lurch)
- G.I. Dood It (1955) – Pvt. Joe Marblehead (remake of Dizzy Yardbird)
- Hook a Crook (1955) * – Det. Joe Besser (remake of 'Fraidy Cat)
- Army Daze (1956) * – Pvt. Joe Besser (remake of Aim, Fire, Scoot)

=== Television ===
- The Ken Murray Show (1950)
- The Colgate Comedy Hour (1951–1953)
- The Alan Young Show (1951)
- The Abbott and Costello Show (1952–1953) – Stinky Davis
- The Spike Jones Show (1954) – jailhouse warden
- My Little Margie (1954) – butterfly catcher
- The Jack Benny Program (1954–1961)
- The Millionaire (1955) – hobo
- Willy (1955), episode "Willy Saves Harvey From Fraud"
- Damon Runyon Theater (1955)
- The Martha Raye Show (1955)
- Club Oasis (1958)
- Kraft Music Hall (1959)
- General Electric Theater (1961) – Fight manager
- The Alvin Show (1961–1962) – Additional voices
- The Joey Bishop Show (1962–1965) – Mr. Jillson
- Batman (1966) – Hizzoner the Penguin
- The Mothers-in-Law (1968) – "How Not to Manage a Rock Group", "The First Anniversary is the Hardest"
- That's Life (1968)
- That Girl (1968) – "Eleven Angry Men and That Girl"
- The Don Rickles Show (1968)
- Where's Huddles? (1970) – Coach (voice)
- The Houndcats (1972) – Putty Puss (voice)
- Jeannie (1973) – Babu (voice)
- The New Scooby-Doo Movies (1973) – Babu (voice)
- The Oddball Couple (1975) – Additional voices
- Scooby's All Star Laff-A-Lympics (1977–1978) – Babu (voice)
- Fred Flintstone and Friends (1977–1978) – Babu (voice)
- Yogi's Space Race (1978) – Scare Bear (voice)
- Galaxy Goof-Ups (1978–1979) – Scare Bear (voice)
- Shirt Tales (1982) – Elmo the Elephant (voice)
- My Smurfy Valentine (1983) – Cupid (voice)
