= Jim Hawthorne (DJ) =

American radio personality and comic actor (1918–2007)

- Born: November 20, 1918; Victor, Colorado, United States
- Died: November 6, 2007 (aged 88); Santa Barbara, California, United States
- Other names: Hawthorne; Weather Eyes
- Occupations: Disc jockey actor comedian

Jim Hawthorne (November 20, 1918 – November 6, 2007) was an American radio personality and comic actor. He was a disc jockey who was a pioneer of "free form" radio.

Hawthorne was born in Victor, Colorado, and began his career at a Denver radio station. He gained national attention for his broadcasts on Pasadena, California, station KXLA in 1947. He also issued his own records, billing himself as "Hawthorne", such as "Turn Your Head, Sweetheart (I Can Still See Your Face)".

In 1950, he created, produced and starred in the Saturday night coast-to-coast radio program, The Hawthorne Thing, which was the final network radio show to originate in NBC's Hollywood Radio City. "The Hawthorne Thing" also aired worldwide on the Armed Forces Radio and Television Service (AFRTS).

At KLAC/Channel 13 in the early 1950s, he created the first late-evening talk show on television, This Is Hawthorne. An article in the Los Angeles Times reflecting on early TV described the show as "predecessor of NBC's Saturday Night Live."

Jules White, who produced short comedy films for Columbia Pictures, often scouted radio comedians (Vera Vague, Harry Von Zell, Margie Liszt, etc.). In 1951 he hired Jim Hawthorne to appear in two-reel comedies, teamed with comedian Joe Besser. Billed in lower-case letters as "hawthorne", he and Besser blundered their way through slapstick situations as dumb detectives ('Fraidy Cat) and dumb soldiers (Aim, Fire, Scoot). Hawthorne returned to Columbia in 1955 to film new scenes for his two comedies, which were remade with new plotlines as Hook a Crook and Army Daze. Hawthorne fondly recalled the Besser shorts in 2006 and had hoped the series would have run longer: "It was also my hope that the Besser association would be an ongoing reality as I love films, and shall never forget the time I took an off-ramp adjacent to a drive-in movie theatre and there I was [in Hook a Crook] doing that double take on the huge screen. Talk about timing, it appeared that my eyes followed me during the fleeting moments passing by. Somewhat scary, seeing yourself looking and following you while wheeling by."

On KNBH/Channel 4, beginning in 1952, he did a daily five-minute weather show. In 1958, Jim traveled to KYA-San Francisco and created Voice Your Choice, which he brought to KDAY. He was elected president of the newly formed Disc Jockey Association in 1960.

In the early 1960s, while doing Instant Weather on KTTV/Channel 11, Hawthorne joined KFWB as assistant program director and morning disc jockey, and eventually became vice president and national program manager for Crowell-Collier Broadcasting. While at KFWB he joined Sherman Grinberg Productions as a writer, producer, and narrator. He produced comedy shorts for television, Jim Hawthorne's Funny World and Quicky Quiz.

In 1965, "Ol' Weather Eyes" moved to Honolulu to "retire" and ended up creating the Checkers and Pogo children's show, which ran from 1967 to 1982 (long after he passed the role of "Checkers" to other actors). He was also involved with programming at KGMB in Honolulu and was creative consultant to popular morning-radio personality Hal Lewis (Aku).

In 1970, Hawthorne moved back to his hometown, Denver, to help his ailing mother. He stayed for 11 years and established a very successful career at KOA, eventually becoming the station's general manager. In the late 1980s, Hawthorne returned to Southern California.

Hawthorne continued to entertain in semi-retirement. On November 6, 2007, he died of congestive heart disease at age 88 in Santa Barbara, California.
