= Jeannie (TV series) =

1973 American animated television series

- Based on: I Dream of Jeannie by Sidney Sheldon
- Developed by: Sidney Morse
- Written by: Sidney Morse; Marion Hargrove; David Ketchum; Leonard Stadd; Arlene Stadd; William Canning; Bruce Shelly; Frank Waldman; Phyllis White; Robert White
- Directed by: Charles August Nichols
- Voices of: Julie McWhirter; Joe Besser; Gay Autterson; Tommy Cook; Mark Hamill; Bob Hastings; John Stephenson; Janet Waldo
- Country of origin: United States
- Original language: English
- No. of seasons: 1
- No. of episodes: 16

Production
- Executive producers: William Hanna; Joseph Barbera
- Producer: Iwao Takamoto
- Running time: 30 minutes
- Production companies: Hanna-Barbera Productions; Screen Gems

Original release
- Network: CBS
- Release: September 8 – December 22, 1973

Jeannie is an American animated television series that originally aired for a 16-episode season on CBS from September 8 to December 22, 1973. It was produced by Hanna-Barbera in association with Screen Gems, and its founders William Hanna and Joseph Barbera are the executive producers. Despite being a spin-off of sorts of the television sitcom I Dream of Jeannie, Jeannie has little in common with its parent show. In this version, the title character is rescued on the beaches of southern California by a high school student, Corey Anders. Jeannie is accompanied by genie-in-training Babu, and they become companions to Corey and his best friend, Henry Glopp, both of whom also help Jeannie and Babu adjust to their new home as well as life in Los Angeles. The series was marketed towards a younger demographic than the live-action sitcom it was based on.

Julie McWhirter replaces Barbara Eden in the lead role. In his first voice-acting job, Mark Hamill plays Corey Anders, and also sings the theme music. Babu is voiced by Joe Besser, who had a successful voice-acting career at the time. Jeannie was shown as part of CBS's Saturday-morning cartoon programming block, and episodes aired between 1973 and 1975. The show was also included on the wheel series Fred Flintstone and Friends, and had crossovers with the Scooby-Doo franchise. Though a few retrospective reviews of Jeannie have been negative, it has gained popularity after Warner Bros. bought Hanna-Barbera and its properties in 1996 as it was one of the few series not to be owned by them (as Sony currently holds the rights, along with the rest of the Jeannie franchise). It remains popular with the public and industry professionals, and has been recently distributed via two streaming services: Crackle and CTV Throwback. It can also be seen on MeTV Toons. An episode can also be viewed at the UCLA Film & Television Archive.

== Premise and characters ==
In Jeannie, high school student Corey Anders (Note: Some commentators spell Corey's name as either "Corry", "Corky", or "Corkey".) discovers Jeannie's bottle while surfing and draws the title character out of it. Corey becomes the master to Jeannie and her apprentice Babu. Portrayed as a 16-year-old, Jeannie is shown as training the "junior genie" Babu, who frequently causes trouble due to his inexperience with magic. Babu is characterized as having a habit of "popping in at the most inopportune times". The pair become close "friends and protectors" to Corey, who is Jeannie's love interest.

Episodes typically focus on Corey's attempts to hide Jeannie and Babu's true identities as he attends Center City High School and Jeannie's difficulties with adjusting to life in 1970s California. Corey's storylines also include his friend Henry Glopp; other than Corey, Henry is the only other person aware of Jeannie's identity as a genie. Other supporting characters include Corey's mom Mrs. Anders, a frenemy named S. Melvin Farthinggale, the Master of all Genies known as the Great Hadji, and Debbie. S. Melvin is portrayed as a "snobbish snoop", who frequently sneaks around the Anders' home due to his suspicions about Jeannie and Babu.

Jeannie is an animated spin-off of the live-action television sitcom I Dream of Jeannie, although it has a substantially different plot than its parent show. In this version, Corey replaces astronaut Major Tony Nelson. While I Dream of Jeannie was a family show, it focused on '60s-style relationships (especially in its first season), the NASA moon project and broad slapstick. The humor used for the animated Jeannie, more focused toward teenagers and children, is of the Archie comics nature, with themes of dating, school events and friendship. Like the original series, Jeannie is emotionally attached to her assumed boyfriend and becomes jealous in the face of competition, a staple of teen-age comics and sitcoms. Unlike the original series, Jeannie is depicted as younger and with red hair instead of blonde; she activates her magic by shaking her ponytail rather than blinking her eyes.

== Production ==
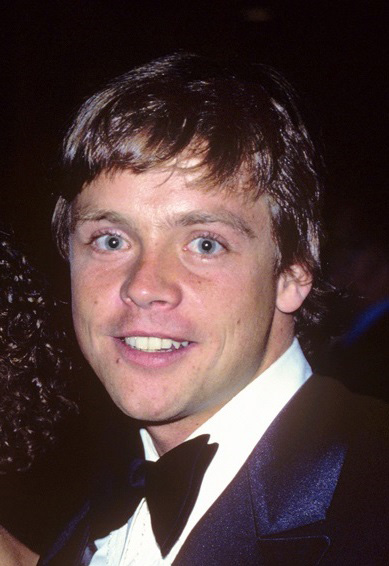
Mark Hamill (pictured in 1978) had his first voice-acting job on Jeannie.

Jeannie was a Hanna-Barbera production, with the company's founders William Hanna and Joseph Barbera serving as the show's executive producers. Charles August Nichols was the director, and Iwao Takamoto was the producer. I Dream of Jeannie creator Sidney Sheldon is not included in the credits for Jeannie, which The A.V. Club's Will Harris attributes to the extreme differences between the two shows. Hanna-Barbera had created Jeannie as a way to appeal to a younger demographic. The musical director was Hoyt Curtin and music supervisor was Paul DeKorte. Jeannie was a co-production between Hanna-Barbera and Columbia Pictures, as Columbia's Screen Gems television division was the owner of I Dream of Jeannie. Hanna-Barbera had a long association with Columbia and Screen Gems as they distributed their earlier shows, including The Flintstones and The Jetsons. However, the rights to all Hanna-Barbera properties were transferred to Warner Bros. after the studio purchased the company in 1996. Hanna-Barbera did not, however, animate the titles for the original I Dream of Jeannie—that was DePatie-Freleng—but they did animate a variety of opening titles (including both Darrins) for Screen Gems' Bewitched.

Barbara Eden was replaced by Julie McWhirter as the voice of Jeannie. Mark Hamill provides the voice for Corey Anders in his first voice-acting job. Along with voicing the character, he sings the theme music. Hamill would not become well known as a voice actor until his role as Joker in the television show Batman: The Animated Series.

Bob Hastings voiced Henry Glopp, who was the animated counterpart of Bill Daily's Major Roger Healey character from the live-action TV series, while Joe Besser portrayed the comic foil Babu. Besser, a veteran actor of 40 years by 1973, had become active as a successful voice actor during the 1970s and 1980s; along with Jeannie, he also voiced regular characters in the television programs The Houndcats and Yogi's Space Race. He had previously appeared in an I Dream of Jeannie episode, alongside the members of The Three Stooges. Debbie, Mark, and Mrs. Anders are played by Arlene Golonka, Michael Bell, and Janet Waldo, respectively. Mrs. Anders is voiced by Ginny Tyler in episode 11 ("The Blind Date") and Janet Waldo in episode 16 ("The Wish"). John Stephenson and Tommy Cook voice Great Hadji and S. Melvin Farthinghill (a.k.a. Smellvin) respectively. Sherry Alberoni, Julie Bennett, Don Messick, and Ginny Tyler provide additional voice-acting for the series.

== Episodes ==
No.	Title	Original release date
1	"Surf's Up"	September 8, 1973
Jeannie becomes increasingly jealous when Corey partners with Aggie for a surfing contest. She attempts to stop the partnership by stealing his math exam paper. However, Aggie dumps Corey and works with S. Melvin instead. When Corey decides to pick Jeannie as his partner instead, she tries to find the exam paper, but Babu had made it vanish. Babu impersonates Corey so he can attend the surfing contest with Jeannie. Unfortunately, Babu is afraid of the waves and refuses to do it. However, Jeannie manages to find Corey’s exam, puts it back, and she and Corey manage to make it to the beach just in time for the competition. They win without using any magic. But when girls try to page Corey, the new champion, Jeannie doesn't hesitate to use magic this time.
2	"The Decathlon"	September 15, 1973
Corey and Henry work on their athletics for a competition versus a military academy. While they are convinced their diet is helping them, their success is really caused by Jeannie's magic. Babu accidentally tells them, which causes Corey to become extremely upset with Jeannie. Jeannie tries to motivate Corey and Henry by introducing them to Greek champions. She also thwarts S. Melvin's cheating so that Corey will win, which he does, fair and square.
3	"The Great Ski Robbery"	September 22, 1973
Henry and Corey go to work at a ski resort diner in the mountains, and they make sure Jeannie does not join them. They find the job to be much harder than expected. While helping them, Jeannie finds out Corey tricked her so he would have time to date a girl. Corey and Henry get fired as a result of Jeannie’s actions, and eventually, Corey loses his temper and shouts at Jeannie, causing her to cry. However, Jeannie later assists both Corey and Henry in catching a couple of crown-stealing crooks to get back their jobs.
4	"Survival Course"	September 29, 1973
Corey and Henry sign up for the Flora and Fauna field trip so that they can spend time with some girls, but an envious Jeannie forces them to go on the Survival Course field trip instead. Corey does best to use primitive methods of finding food while Jeannie gives him a little help. He grows increasingly frustrated when Jeannie uses her magic to help him and Henry, including by providing them with a luxurious tent, which gets them in trouble. As punishment, they have to find their way back to camp from deep within the forest. When Corey and Henry get lost, Jeannie and Babu help them. Babu manages after some confusion to take them to the campsite. Finally, Babu asks Jeannie if "a genie could be in two places at once time". Jeannie says no. Babu realizes he was wrong about something and runs away. Jeannie then realizes that Babu has mistaken himself for a stinky skunk. Jeannie addresses the skunk referring to it as 'whoever was', and says goodbye making a stinky face and holding her nose. And runs away disappearing. The skunk shows that he didn't understand anything.
5	"The Power Failure"	October 6, 1973
While driving a new motorcycle, Corey and Henry meet Darlene Connway. In a jealous rage, Jeannie steals the motorcycle to go to a beauty salon in order to make herself look like Darlene, but she loses her ponytail. Without her ponytail, she cannot perform magic or fly. Babu fails to grow it back or conjure a motorcycle. While Babu turns to Hadji for help, Jeannie attends school with Corey and Henry. Great Hadji decides to help Jeannie and returns her ponytail. With her hair and powers back, Jeannie returns the motorcycle to Corey and he and Henry compete in a motocross competition with Jeannie helping out unnoticed as usual.
6	"The Dognappers"	October 13, 1973
Corey and Henry start a dog-sitting service, leaving Jeannie to take care of the show dog Fifi. When Fifi's owner comes to reclaim her, Jeannie and Babu believe Fifi was dognapped. Meanwhile, the town dognappers get hold of Fifi, and Henry and Corey get in trouble with the police. With Jeannie and Babu's help, Henry and Corey find and trap the dognappers.
7	"The Pigeon"	October 20, 1973
Corey and Henry get a racing pigeon, but she lays an egg and is unable to race, as she has to take care of it. They are stuck with a frightened pigeon, Mervin, who seemingly cannot beat the champion racing pigeon. Jeannie, Corey and Henry train Mervin for the Saturday racing. With Jeannie's assistance Mervin manages to get past S. Melvin's wily tricks and win the race.
8	"Helen of Troy"	October 27, 1973
Since the town library is closed, Corey cannot complete his research for a term project on Helen of Troy. Jeannie brings back Helen with her magic to help Corey, but she becomes jealous when the two become romantically involved. Jeannie reveals Helen's true character and the reality of Troy to Corey, which prompts him to return to his project.
9	"The Sailors"	November 3, 1973
Corey and Henry enter a sailboat race with Barbie rather than Jeannie. Jeannie uses magic to take Barbie's place, but accidentally gets Corey's boat disqualified from the race. Corey and Jeannie stage a sea rescue to make the commodore reinstate his race position. Corey wins the race after eluding S. Melvin's cheating.
10	"The Kid Brother"	November 10, 1973
Corey agrees to babysit Linda's younger brother Billy. Meanwhile, Billy sees Jeannie floating and realizes she is a genie. He tries to prove her existence, but Linda does not believe him. Finally, Jeannie exposes herself fully to Billy, who is at first disappointed that Jeannie cannot grant him wishes, as she is not his master. However, Jeannie makes sure to encourage imagination and remind him the importance of her secrecy as well as being honest. Linda separates with Corey after seeing Babu.
11	"The Blind Date"	November 17, 1973
Henry tells Corey that his cousin Bunny is visiting him. Upon being asked, Corey initially does not want to have a blind date with her until he sees her and find her to be attractive. While they go to a carnival, Jeannie becomes jealous about the date and attempts to break the couple up, which she successfully does. As a result, an angry Corey orders her back into her bottle as punishment, but breaks-up with Bunny after realizing how fickle she is. Unfortunately, while cleaning, Corey's mother comes across the bottle and recycles it. When Corey and Henry return home, they are horrified to discover what has happened. Corey reaches the recycling plant and manages to rescue Jeannie just in time.
12	"The Commercial"	November 24, 1973
Jeannie helps Corey enter a contest which, to his surprise, he becomes the winner of. However, in order to earn a place in a four year college course, he has got to go for a commercial with a beautiful woman, which Jeannie objects to. Jeannie finds an opportunity to get rid of the snooty Miss Twisty Taffy and keep Corey's job intact.
13	"Don Juan"	December 1, 1973
Corey and Henry plan to ask girls to dance with them at a costume party. Because of Henry's shyness, Jeannie casts a charm on Henry getting him a great deal of attention from a group of girls. As Henry becomes accustomed to his popularity and spends more time with the girls, Corey becomes increasingly unhappy and lonely, especially after he is ridiculed by the girls. Feeling guilty, Jeannie tries to sort things out with help from Rocky, but at the party, Corey's date leaves him for Henry, making him feel even more upset. Jeannie removes the charm she placed on Henry, and he dances with Lisa. And to Jeannie’s happiness, she shares a dance with Corey, which cheers him up. She then leans over Corey and he remains romantic and makes a pleasant smile.
14	"The Dog"	December 8, 1973
Great Hadji assigns Jeannie to take care of his genie dog Salome and Corey, wanting to help out, offers to let her stay in his house with Jeannie and Babu. However, the disobedient dog gets Corey in trouble and interferes with his date, so Jeannie tries to send her back to the Great Hadji. Salome later steals Great Hadji's golden cup and when he returns to Corey’s house to retrieve it, Corey, out of frustration over everything that's happened, insults Salome and the Great Hadji angrily turns Corey into a dog. Corey and Salome get taken to the pound, but Salome releases Corey and every other dog. As a result, Corey is to be transferred to the military and Henry himself almost signs up for military service in order to rescue Corey. Jeannie tricks Great Hadji into turning Corey back to his normal form before Henry can fill out his enlistment form, and they all go home.
15	"The Jinx"	December 15, 1973
After many accidents, Babu thinks he is a genie jinx and decides to run away from home. Jeannie enlists Great Hadji's help to track Babu, and she is also assisted by Henry and Corey. They find him in the forest, and he only agrees to return home if nothing bad happens again. Jeannie follows him everywhere and corrects anything going wrong, convincing him he's not a jinx. Finally, Babu gains so much confidence after Jeannie makes him believe that he fixed Corey's motorcycle that he says he will help Corey and Henry all the time. They get agitated, Henry runs away, and Corey calls out for Jeannie. Jeannie, also agitated, covers her head with her hands and falls purposefully into a cloud.
16	"The Wish"	December 22, 1973
After Corey's victorious football tournament, Henry feels inferior and lacking potential success. Jeannie grants Henry a birthday wish that causes him to swap bodies with Corey. This leads to confusion for them and their friends and family. When the wish expires, Corey's date Linda ends their relationship.

== Broadcast history and release ==
Jeannie aired on CBS with its 16 30-minute episodes initially broadcast in 1973. CBS continued to run episodes until August 1975 as part of its Saturday-morning cartoon programming block. The episode "The Decathlon" is available for viewing at the UCLA Film & Television Archive. Jeannie was made available digitally by CTV Television Network through their streaming service CTV Throwback, as well as on Sony and Columbia's streaming service Crackle.

Jeannie was shown as part of the wheel series Fred Flintstone and Friends, which had Fred Flintstone host excerpts taken from Hanna-Barbera programs. It also had several crossovers with the Scooby-Doo franchise. Babu appears in the television show Scooby's All-Star Laff-A-Lympics, in which he participates on the "Scooby Doobies" team. Babu, Jeannie, Corey, and Henry return for The New Scooby-Doo Movies episode "Mystery in Persia", also known as "Scooby-Doo Meets Jeannie". Jeannie helps to trap the genie Jadal the Evil inside a bottle and uncover that Adbullah is his master.

On September 27, 2026, the show began airing on MeTV Toons.

== Critical reception ==
Retrospective reviews of Jeannie are negative. Freelance writer David Perlmutter criticized the series for relying on "weak reimaginings of the original concept". Perlmutter, however, praised Joe Besser's performance as a highlight. In his list of the strangest animated spin-offs, Closer Weekly's Ed Gross said he was disappointed Jeannie was not a faithful adaptation of I Dream of Jeannie. As part of his commentary on cartoons aired during the Vietnam War, ethnic studies professor Christopher P. Lehman, dismissed Jeannie as "promot[ing] the concept of man as woman's master". He found the premise to be harmful to women in comparison to the female empowerment message in the television show Wonder Woman. Media historian Hal Erickson panned the decision to use younger characters, which he felt was a "complete disregard or contempt for the intelligence of the viewing children and adolescents".
