= Susan Dey =

American actress (born 1952)

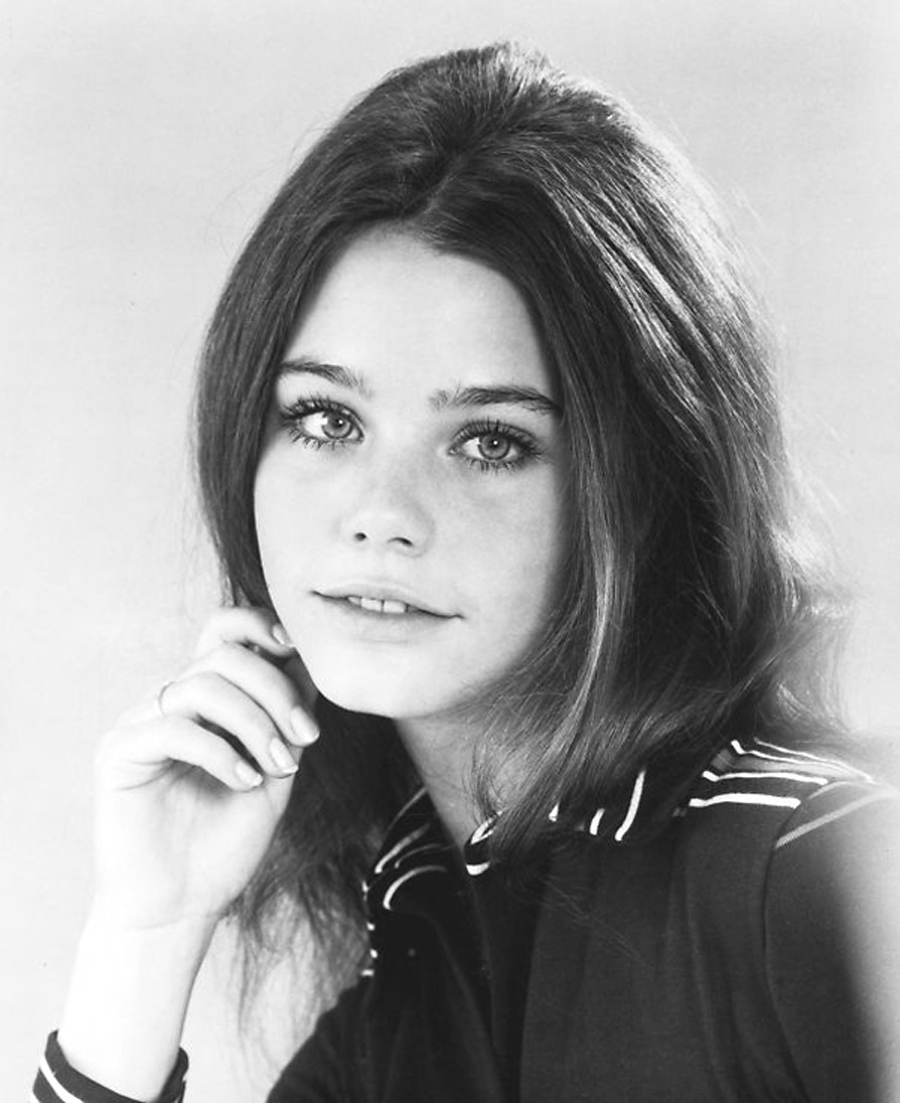
- Publicity photo for The Partridge Family, 1970
- Born: Susan Hallock Dey; December 10, 1952 (age 73); Pekin, Illinois, U.S.
- Education: Fox Lane High School
- Occupations: Actress; model; producer; author
- Years active: 1970–2004
- Known for: The Partridge Family; L.A. Law; L.A. Law: The Movie
- Spouses: Lenny Hirshan (m. 1976; div. 1981) Bernard Sofronski (m. 1988)
- Children: 1

Susan Hallock Dey (born December 10, 1952) is an American retired actress, known for her television roles as Laurie Partridge on the sitcom The Partridge Family from 1970 to 1974, and as Grace Van Owen on the drama series L.A. Law from 1986 to 1992. A three-time Emmy Award nominee and six-time Golden Globe Award nominee, she won the Golden Globe for Best Actress in a Drama Series for L.A. Law in 1988.

== Early life and education ==
Dey was born in Pekin, Illinois, to Ruth Pyle (née Doremus) Dey, a nurse, and Robert Smith Dey. Ruth died in 1961, when Susan was eight.

Dey attended Columbus Elementary School in Thornwood, New York. She later moved to Mount Kisco, New York, where she graduated from Fox Lane High School in 1970.

== Career ==
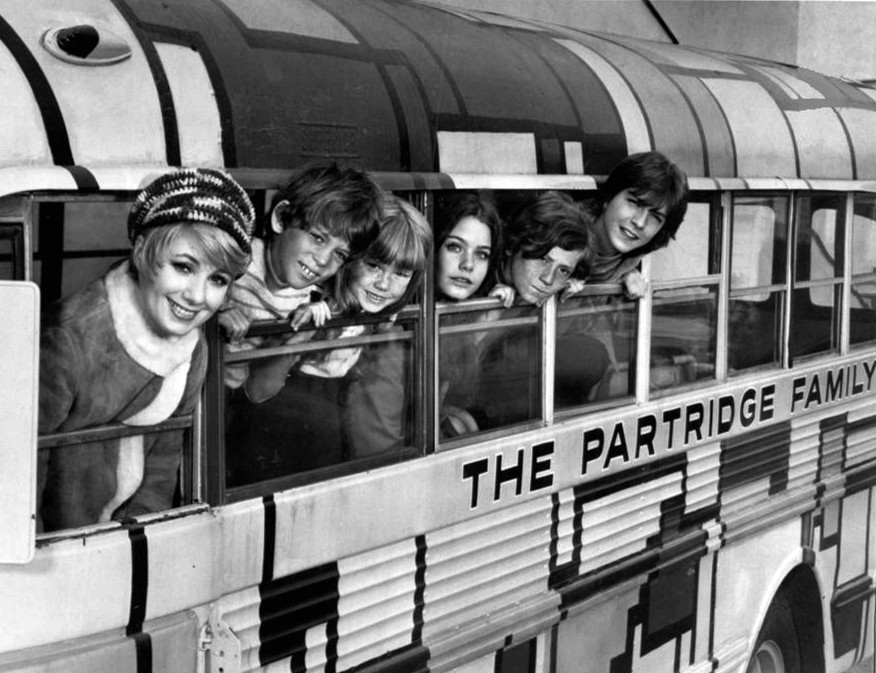
The Partridge Family, season 1. L-R: Shirley Jones, Jeremy Gelbwaks, Suzanne Crough, Susan Dey, Danny Bonaduce and David Cassidy

Dey began her professional life as a model. Her first modeling break was the cover photo of a booklet by Pursettes tampons on first facts of menstruation for young girls, "Getting to Know Yourself."

She was cast as Laurie Partridge in the television series The Partridge Family from 1970 to 1974. She was 17 when she won the part, and had no acting experience. She briefly reprised that role for the Hanna-Barbera animated series, Partridge Family 2200 A.D. for two episodes, before being replaced by Sherry Alberoni. She returned to weekly network television in 1977 as the co-star of the short-lived sitcom Loves Me, Loves Me Not.

Dey's first film role was as a passenger in the 1972 airline hijack movie Skyjacked, starring Charlton Heston. In a 1977 made-for-television movie, Mary Jane Harper Cried Last Night, she portrayed a disturbed young mother with serious psychological problems who begins to take them out on her toddler daughter. Also in 1977, Dey starred opposite William Katt in First Love, directed by Joan Darling. She also appeared in the Barnaby Jones episode "Testament of Power" (1977).

Dey co-starred with Albert Finney in the 1981 science-fiction film Looker, written and directed by Michael Crichton. She had a leading role in 1986's Echo Park, as a struggling waitress-actress who takes a job as a stripper delivering singing telegrams. She starred on L.A. Law from 1986 through 1992 as Los Angeles County deputy district attorney Grace Van Owen, who later became a judge. She won a Golden Globe Award as Actress in a Leading Role – Drama Series for the role in 1988. She was also nominated in each of the following four years. She was also nominated for the Emmy Award for Outstanding Lead Actress in a Drama Series in 1987, 1988, and 1989.

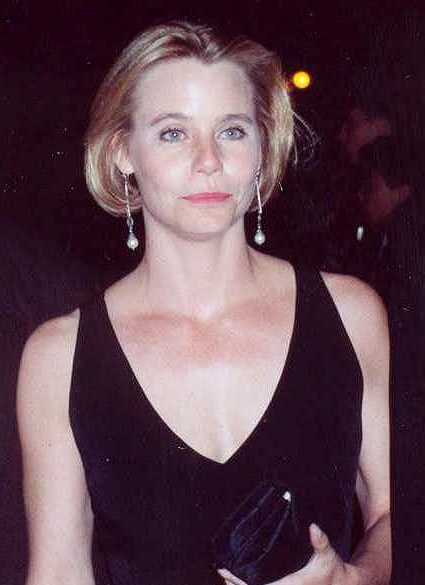
Dey at the 1990 Emmy Awards

She hosted a 1992 episode of Saturday Night Live. Later that year, she co-starred in the sitcom Love & War. Although the show ran until 1995, Dey was replaced in 1993 by Annie Potts because producers reportedly felt she had "no chemistry" with co-star Jay Thomas. In 1993, Dey produced and starred in Lies & Lullabies (later released on DVD as Sad Inheritance), where she played a pregnant cocaine addict.

Dey was mentioned in Shirley Jones's memoir as the only cast member who "consistently refused" to take part in Partridge Family reunions.

In 1972, Dey was credited as the author of a book titled Susan Dey's Secrets on Boys, Beauty and Popularity.

== Personal life ==
During the production of The Partridge Family, Dey had romantic feelings for co-star David Cassidy. They eventually pursued a relationship when the show ended, but Cassidy broke it off as he did not share her feelings. In 1994, Cassidy disclosed details of his relationship with Dey in his autobiography C'mon, Get Happy ... Fear and Loathing on the Partridge Family Bus; he presumed this led to her severing contact with him.

Dey was married to Leonard "Lenny" Hirshan from 1976 to 1981. They have one daughter. Dey has been married to television producer Bernard Sofronski since 1988.

She serves as a board member of the Rape Treatment Center at UCLA Medical Center, and co-narrated a documentary on campus rape with former L.A. Law co-star Corbin Bernsen. She suffered from anorexia during the run of The Partridge Family.

== Filmography ==
=== Film ===
Year	Title	Role	Notes
1972	The Candidate	Girl in Crowd	
1972	Skyjacked	Elly Brewster	
1977	First Love	Caroline	
1981	Looker	Cindy Fairmont	
1986	Echo Park	May	
1987	The Trouble with Dick	Diane	
1998	Avenged	Margo	
2003	Rain	Dianna Davis	

=== Television ===
Year	Title	Role	Notes
1970–74	The Partridge Family	Laurie Partridge	96 episodes Nominated—Golden Globe Award for Best Supporting Actress – Series, Miniseries or Television Film
1973	Circle of Fear	Peggy	Episode: "Doorway to Death"
1973	Goober and the Ghost Chasers	Laurie Partridge (voice)	8 episodes
1973	Terror on the Beach	DeeDee Glynn	Television film
1974	Partridge Family 2200 A.D.	Laurie Partridge (voice)	2 episodes
1975	The Rookies	Angel	Episode: "Angel"
1975	Hawaii Five-O	Susan Bradshaw	Episode: "Target? the Lady"
1975	S.W.A.T.	Janice	2 episodes
1975	Cage Without a Key	Valerie Smith	Television film
1976	The Quest	Charlotte Rosee	Episode: "The Captive"
1976	The Streets of San Francisco	Barbara Ross	Episode: "The Thrill Killers" (filmed as a two-hour episode; aired in two parts)
1977	Mary Jane Harper Cried Last Night	Rowena Harper	Television film
1977	Loves Me, Loves Me Not	Jane Benson	6 episodes
1977	Barnaby Jones	Linda Jason	Episode: "Testament of Power"
1978	Little Women	Jo March	Television miniseries
1980	The Comeback Kid	Megan Barrett	Television film
1983	Sunset Limousine	Julie Preston	Television film
1983–84	Emerald Point N.A.S.	Celia Mallory	22 episodes
1983	Malibu	Linda Harvey	Television film
1984	Love Leads the Way	Beth	Television film
1986–92	L.A. Law	Grace Van Owen	110 episodes Golden Globe Award for Best Actress – Television Series Drama; Nominated—Golden Globe Award for Best Actress – Television Series Drama (1989–92); Nominated—Primetime Emmy Award for Outstanding Lead Actress in a Drama Series (1987–89); Nominated—Viewers for Quality Television Award for Best Actress in a Quality Drama Series
1987	Angel in Green	Sister Ann McKeon	Television film
1992–93	Love & War	Wallis "Wally" Porter	23 episodes
1992	Bed of Lies	Vicky Daniel	Television film
1993	Lies and Lullabies	Christina Kinsey	Television film (aka Sad Inheritance)
1994	Beyond Betrayal	Joanna/Emily Doyle	Television film
1995	Deadly Love	Rebecca Barnes	Television film
1995	Blue River	Mrs. Sellers	Television film
1997	Bridge of Time	Madeleine Armstrong	Television film
1999	Family Law	Karen Hershey	Episode: "Holt vs. Holt"
2002	L.A. Law: The Movie	Grace Van Owen	Television film
2002	Disappearance	Patty Henley	Television film
2004	Third Watch	Dr. Breene	2 episodes
