= Michael McCarthy professional credits =

This article includes the professional credits of Michael McCarthy. Listed are all the professional credits, for each category, in chronological order.

== Opera ==
Opera
Year	Title	Role	Notes
Unknown	Rigoletto (Verdi)	Ensemble	Cork Opera House, Ireland
1997	Inkle and Yarico (Arnold and Colman, recomposed by James McConnel 1997)	Thomas Inkle	Holder's season, Barbados 6–27 March 1997
1997	Inkle and Yarico (Arnold and Colman, recomposed by James McConnel 1997)	Thomas Inkle	Crampton Theatre, Washington D.C. 1997
1997	Inkle and Yarico (Arnold and Colman, recomposed by James McConnel 1997)	Thomas Inkle	Berlin 1997
1999	Inkle and Yarico in Concert (Arnold and Colman, recomposed by James McConnel 1997)	Thomas Inkle	Edinburgh Festival 13 August 1999; Aired live to Covent Garden, London

== Musical theatre ==
Musical theatre
Year	Title	Role	Notes
1983	Mame (Jerry Herman)	Patrick Dennis	Cork Opera House, Ireland
1985	No, No, Nanette (Caesar, Harbach and Youmans)	Tom Trainer	Cork Opera House, Ireland
1986	Camelot (Lerner and Loewe)	Sir Lancelot	Cork Opera House, Ireland
Unknown	Love from Judy (Eric Maschwitz and Jean Webster)	Unknown	
Unknown	Cole Porter (biographical revue)	Soloist / Ensemble	Okoboji Summer Theatre, Stephens College, USA
1987	Cabaret (Kander and Ebb)	Max	Macklanburg Playhouse, Stephens College, USA
Unknown	Brigadoon (Lerner and Loewe)	Tom	Macklanburg Playhouse, Stephens College, USA
Unknown	The Baker's Wife (Stephen Schwartz)	Dominique	Macklanburg Playhouse, Stephens College, USA
Unknown	A Little Night Music (Stephen Sondheim)	Count Carl Magnus	Okoboji Summer Theatre, Stephens College, USA
1990	The Desert Song (Sigmund Romberg and Otto Harbach)	The Red Shadow	Cork Opera House, Ireland 3 April 1990 – 11 April 1990
1990	Les Misérables (Claude-Michel Schönberg and Alain Boublil)	Combeferre / Factory Foreman	Palace Theatre, London 1990
1991	Les Misérables (Claude-Michel Schönberg and Alain Boublil)	Combeferre / Factory Foreman	Palace Theatre, London 1991
1992	Les Misérables (Claude-Michel Schönberg and Alain Boublil)	Combeferre / Factory Foreman	Palace Theatre, London January 1992 – October 1992
1992	Les Misérables (Claude-Michel Schönberg and Alain Boublil)	Javert	Palace Theatre, Manchester November 1992 – December 1992
1993	Les Misérables (Claude-Michel Schönberg and Alain Boublil)	Javert	Palace Theatre, Manchester 1993
1994	Out of the Blue (Shun-Ichi Tokura and Paul Sand)	Dr. Akizuki	Shaftesbury Theatre, London; Tokura Productions UK Ltd, 4–21 November 1994
1994	Les Misérables (Claude-Michel Schönberg and Alain Boublil)	Javert	Palace Theatre, London 1994
1995	Les Misérables (Claude-Michel Schönberg and Alain Boublil)	Javert	Palace Theatre, London 1995
1995	Les Misérables: The Dream Cast in Concert	Factory Foreman	Royal Albert Hall 8 October 1995
1996	Les Misérables (Claude-Michel Schönberg and Alain Boublil)	Javert	Palace Theatre, London 1996
1997	Les Misérables (Claude-Michel Schönberg and Alain Boublil)	Javert	Theatre Royal, Plymouth 6 May 1997 – 14 June 1997
1997	Les Misérables (Claude-Michel Schönberg and Alain Boublil)	Javert	Birmingham Hippodrome 19 June 1997 – 4 October 1997
1997	Les Misérables (Claude-Michel Schönberg and Alain Boublil)	Javert	Theatre Royal, Sydney November 1997 – December 1997
1998	Les Misérables (Claude-Michel Schönberg and Alain Boublil)	Javert	Theatre Royal, Sydney January 1998 – June 1998
1998	Les Misérables (Claude-Michel Schönberg and Alain Boublil)	Javert	Theatre Royal, Sydney June 1998 – July 1998
1998	Les Misérables (Claude-Michel Schönberg and Alain Boublil)	Javert	Point Theatre, Dublin; August 1998 – September 1998
1998	Les Misérables (Claude-Michel Schönberg and Alain Boublil)	Javert	Princess Theatre, Melbourne; Cover for Roger Lemke September 1998 – October 1998
1998	Les Misérables (Claude-Michel Schönberg and Alain Boublil)	Javert	Point Theatre, Dublin; November 1998 – December 1998
1999	Les Misérables (Claude-Michel Schönberg and Alain Boublil)	Javert	Point Theatre, Dublin; January 1999 – May 1999
2000	Phantom of the Opera (Ken Hill)	Phantom	UK tour/London 2000 – 2001
2001	Les Misérables (Claude-Michel Schönberg and Alain Boublil)	Javert	Palace Theatre, London; 5 March 2001 – December 2001
2002	Les Misérables (Claude-Michel Schönberg and Alain Boublil)	Javert	Palace Theatre, London; January 2002 – 29 May 2002
2002	From Here to Eternity the Musical workshop productions (Stuart Brayson and Tim Rice)	Warden	Series of workshops and studio demo May 2002 – June 2002
2002	Les Misérables (Claude-Michel Schönberg and Alain Boublil)	Javert	Sacramento Community Theatre, Sacramento, California; 10 June 2002 – 14 June 2002 (third week of San Francisco tour)
2002	Les Misérables (Claude-Michel Schönberg and Alain Boublil)	Javert	Shanghai Grand Theatre, China; 22 June 2002 – 7 July 2002
2002	Les Misérables (Claude-Michel Schönberg and Alain Boublil)	Javert	Seoul, South Korea; 12 July 2002 – 4 August 2002
2002	Les Misérables (Claude-Michel Schönberg and Alain Boublil)	Javert	Palace Theatre, London; 2 December 2002 – End December 2002
2003	Les Misérables (Claude-Michel Schönberg and Alain Boublil)	Javert	Palace Theatre, London; January 2003 – 26 April 2003
2003	Les Misérables (Claude-Michel Schönberg and Alain Boublil)	Javert (replacing Terrence Mann)	Imperial Theatre, New York City; 6 May 2003 – 18 May 2003
2003	Les Misérables (Claude-Michel Schönberg and Alain Boublil)	Javert	Palace Theatre, London; 28 May 2003 – December 2003
2004	Les Misérables (Claude-Michel Schönberg and Alain Boublil)	Javert	Queen's Theatre, London; January 2004 – 26 June 2004
2004	Les Misérables (Claude-Michel Schönberg and Alain Boublil)	Javert	Queen's Theatre, London; 28 June 2004 – December 2004
2004	Les Misérables (Claude-Michel Schönberg and Alain Boublil)	Javert	Windsor Castle; 18 November 2004
2005	Les Misérables (Claude-Michel Schönberg and Alain Boublil)	Javert	Queen's Theatre, London; January 2005 – 25 June 2005
2006	Chess (Benny Andersson, Björn Ulvaeus and Tim Rice)	Ivan Molokov	Oslo Spektrum, Oslo, Norway; 9 November 2006 – 12 November 2006
2008	Sweeney Todd: The Demon Barber of Fleet Street (Stephen Sondheim)	Sweeney Todd	The Göteborg Opera, Gothenburg, Sweden; 15 May 2008 – 8 June 2008

== Other theatre ==
Theatre
Year	Title	Role	Notes
Unknown	Ah, Wilderness! (Eugene O'Neill)	Barman	No Mystery Productions
1984	Little Women (Louisa May Alcott)	Laurie	Everyman, Cork, Ireland, 12–17 November 1984
Unknown	Not Now, Darling (John Chapman and Ray Cooney)	Harry McMichael	
Unknown	Pajama Tops (Mawby Green and Ed Feilbert)	Leonard	
Unknown	The London Cuckolds (Edward Ravenscroft)	Mr. Loveday	Macklanburg Playhouse, Stephens College, USA
1987	A View from the Bridge (Arthur Miller)	Marco	Okoboji Summer Theatre, Stephens College, USA
1987	A View from the Bridge (Arthur Miller)	Marco	Edinburgh, August 1987
1988	Twelfth Night (William Shakespeare)	Antonio / Duke	Macklanburg Playhouse, Stephens College, USA
1988	The Hostage (Brendan Behan)	The Officer	Stephens College, USA

== Concerts and special events ==
Concerts and special events
Year	Title	Role	Theatre and date	Notes
1995	Les Misérables – 10th Anniversary Concert (Claude-Michel Schönberg and Alain Boublil)	Factory Foreman	Royal Albert Hall, London 8 October 1995	Available on CD and DVD
1996	Who Could Ask for Anything More? Centenary celebration of Ira Gershwin's birth	Singer (I've Got a Crush on You - duet with Grania Renihan / led whole company in finale Heaven on Earth)	Royal Albert Hall, London 24 November 1996	Recorded for broadcast on BBC Radio 2 and BBC Two; Released on DVD
1997	Les Misérables in concert at Chelmsford Festival (Claude-Michel Schönberg and Alain Boublil)	Javert	Hylands Park, Chelmsford, Essex; 24 August 1997	
1999	Inkle and Yarico in Concert (Arnold and Colman, recomposed by James McConnel 1997)	Thomas Inkle	Edinburgh Festival 13 August 1999	Aired live to Covent Garden, London
2001	A Night of 100 Stars; A tribute show to the composer Marvin Hamlisch	Singer	London Palladium 22 April 2001	In aid of the Green Room Benevolent Fund
2001	Bryn Terfel's Faenol Festival	Singer	Faenol Estate, Gwynedd, North Wales 26 August 2001	Replacing Bryn Terfel
2002	Les Misérables in concert (Claude-Michel Schönberg and Alain Boublil)	Javert	Globe Arena, Stockholm, Sweden November 2002	
2003	Cabaret in the House	Singer	Lauderdale House, North London 12 October 2003	Launch of Lauderdale House Cabaret Season
2004	Opera In The Park concert in Leeds; With the Orchestra of Opera North, Lesley Garrett and Ruthie Henshall	Singer	In the grounds of Temple Newsam, West Yorkshire 19 July 2004	Broadcast on BBC Two Christmas Day 2004 as Lesley Garrett – Music from the Movies; Released under the same title on DVD
2004	Michael Ball's The Musicals on a Summer's Eve	Singer	Harewood House, near Leeds, West Yorkshire 8 August 2004	
2004	Michael Ball's The Musicals on a Summer's Eve	Singer	Forest Café, Lauriston Place, central Edinburgh 15 August 2004	
2004	Michael Ball's The Musicals on a Summer's Eve	Singer	Wilton House, Wilton, Wiltshire 22 August 2004	
2004	Les Misérables – Royal Command Performance (Claude-Michel Schönberg and Alain Boublil)	Javert	Windsor Castle, Berkshire 18 November 2004	Royal Command Performance
2005 – 2009	Michael Ball's The Musicals on a Summer's Eve	Singer	Various venues in the summer, 2005–2009	
2005	The Magic of the Musicals	Singer	Montfort College of Performing Arts, Cork, Ireland; 2005	
2005	Glamorous Nights	Singer	Borough Theatre, Abergavenny, Wales; 17 July 2005	In aid of Gwent Young People's Theatre
2008	Guys and Dolls, concert performance (Frank Loesser)	Sky Masterson	Key West Pops Orchestra, Key West, Florida; 20 January 2008	
2008	Les Misérables (Claude-Michel Schönberg and Alain Boublil)	Javert	St John Loveridge Hall, Guernsey September 2008	
2008	The Music of Andrew Lloyd Webber with the RTÉ Concert Orchestra	Javert	National Concert Hall, Dublin 18 September 2008	
2009	Les Misérables (Claude-Michel Schönberg and Alain Boublil)	Javert	Fort Regent, Jersey March 2009	
2009	Les Misérables (Claude-Michel Schönberg and Alain Boublil)	Javert	Osborne House, Isle of Wight July 2009	
2012	Peter Jöback's I Love Musicals (with the Stockholm Sinfonietta)	Singer	Scandinavium, Gothenburg, Sweden, 19 October 2012; Ericsson Globe Arena, Stockholm, Sweden, 20 October 2012; Spektrum, Oslo, Norway 26 October 2012; Löfbergs Arena, Karlstad, Sweden, 27 October 2012	
2013	Rodgers & Hammerstein at the Movies with the RTÉ Concert Orchestra	Singer	National Concert Hall, Dublin 16 August 2013	This show also went to Limerick, Athlone and Galway
2015	Cork Youth Orchestra – Christmas Proms	Singer	Cork City Hall 12 December 2015	
2016	An Evening at the Proms (with Rebecca Storm and the Band of An Garda Síochána)	Singer	University College Cork 16 July 2016	Part of A Summer's Evening on the Quad at UCC programme
2018	The Music of Rodgers & Hammerstein with the RTÉ Concert Orchestra	Singer	National Concert Hall, Dublin 25 January 2018	
2018	Sounds Amazing with the RTÉ Concert Orchestra	Singer	National Concert Hall, Dublin 30 May 2018	

== Television and radio ==
Television and radio
Year	Title	Role	Broadcaster / broadcast date	Notes
1996	Who Could Ask for Anything More? Centenary celebration of Ira Gershwin's birth	Singer	BBC Radio 2; 7 December 1996	Broadcast live from Royal Albert Hall, London, 24 November 1996
1996	Who Could Ask for Anything More? Centenary celebration of Ira Gershwin's birth	Singer	BBC Two; 31 December 1996	Recorded at the Royal Albert Hall, London, 24 November 1996
1997	Inkle and Yarico in Concert (Arnold and Colman, recomposed by James McConnel 1997)	Thomas Inkle	PBS, USA documentary	Filmed at the Holder's season, Barbados, March 1997
1999	I believe in angels: Christina Noble in Mongolia with Denise Drysdale (one-off documentary)	Singer (title track)	Seven, Australia; 20 February 1999	Theme tune for a documentary about Christina Noble
2000	The 10th Kingdom Series 1, Episode 4	The Gypsy King	NBC, February 2000	Carnival Films
2000	Jesus Christ Superstar TV film (Tim Rice and Andrew Lloyd Webber)	Second Priest	Great Performances, PBS; 16 October 2000	Really Useful Group; 2001 Performing Arts Emmy winner
2004	Lesley Garrett – Music from the Movies also starring Ruthie Henshall	Singer	BBC Two; 25 December 2004, 6.10pm	Recorded at the "Opera In The Park" concert in the grounds of Temple Newsam House (near Leeds), with the Orchestra of Opera North, 17 July 2004
2010	Friday Night Is Music Night; Singing: "Summertime", "Nature Boy" and "If Ever I Would Leave You"	Singer	BBC Radio 2; 19 February 2010	

== Discography ==
CDs and DVDs
Year	Title	Role	Record label	Notes
1994	Broadway (compilation CD)	Singer	CD Baby	Solo album
1994	Out of the Blue (Shun-Ichi Tokura and Paul Sand)	Dr. Akizuki	Stage Door Records	Cast CD
1995	Les Misérables – 10th Anniversary – The Dreamcast in Concert DVD (Claude-Michel Schönberg and Alain Boublil)	Factory Foreman	BBC Home Entertainment	Royal Albert Hall, London, 8 October 1995
1996	Who Could Ask for Anything More? DVD; Centenary celebration of Ira Gershwin's birth	Singer	BBC	Royal Albert Hall, London, 7 December 1996
2000	Living for the Moment (compilation CD)	Singer	CD Baby	Solo album
2000	Jesus Christ Superstar DVD (Tim Rice and Andrew Lloyd Webber)	Second Priest	Universal Studios	DVD
2004	Lesley Garrett – Music from the Movies also starring Ruthie Henshall	Singer	Eagle Rock Entertainment	DVD, recorded with the Orchestra of Opera North, Opera In The Park concert in Leeds 19 July 2003.
2006	Dracula – Original London Cast (Gareth Evans and Christopher J. Orton)	Dracula	CD Baby	Concept CD
2010	It's Just The Beginning: The Songs of Charles Miller & Kevin Hammonds (Charles Miller & Kevin Hammonds)	Singer	MaKiNG Records	Compilation CD. Track: Sail Me There from the musical Hope
2012	You're Still You (compilation CD)	Singer	CD Baby	Solo album
