= Silent Strength =

Silent Strength may refer to:

- Silent Strength (film), 1919 American silent film directed by Paul Scardon
- Silent Strength (album), 1989 album by Shirley Jones
