= A Tribute to Richard Rodgers =

Studio album by Shirley Jones
- Released: March 2011
- Recorded: 2010
- Genre: Pop; Traditional pop
- Label: Encore Music Presents Records
- Producer: Les Brown Jr.

Shirley Jones chronology
A Touch of Christmas (2010)	A Tribute to Richard Rodgers (2011)

A Tribute to Richard Rodgers is a studio album by American singer Shirley Jones of The Partridge Family music group. The album features 10 tracks of Richard Rodgers songs performed by Shirley Jones. It was produced by Les Brown Jr. for Rayburt Productions. A Tribute to Richard Rodgers features several well known classics, including a cover version of The Marcels hit "Blue Moon". The album was released in 2011 on Encore Music Presents Records.

== Track listing ==
1. "I Wish I Were in Love Again"
2. "It Never Entered My Mind"
3. "Isn't It Romantic?"
4. "Spring Is Here"
5. "Where Or When"
6. "I Have Dreamed"
7. "Blue Moon"
8. "It Might As Well Be Spring"
9. "Falling in Love with Love"
10. "Bewitched Bothered and Bewildered"
