= Shirley Jones =

American actress and singer (born 1934)

- Jones in the 1970s
- Born: Shirley Mae Jones; March 31, 1934 (age 92); Charleroi, Pennsylvania, U.S.
- Occupations: Actress; singer
- Years active: 1950–2018
- Spouses: Jack Cassidy (m. 1956; div. 1975) Marty Ingels (m. 1977; died 2015)
- Children: 3, including Shaun and Patrick Cassidy
- Musical career
- Genres: Pop; traditional pop; gospel
- Instrument: Vocals
- Labels: Colpix; RCA Victor; Bell; A&M; Diadem; Stage Door; Encore Music Presents
- Website: castproductions.com/shirleyjones.html

Shirley Mae Jones (born March 31, 1934) is an American actress and singer. In her six decades in show business, she has starred as wholesome characters in a number of musical films, such as Oklahoma! (1955), Carousel (1956), and The Music Man (1962). She won the Academy Award for Best Supporting Actress for playing a vengeful prostitute in Elmer Gantry (1960).

She played the lead role of Shirley Partridge, the widowed mother of five children, in the musical situation-comedy television series The Partridge Family (1970–1974), which co-starred her real-life stepson, David Cassidy, son of Jack Cassidy.

== Early life ==
Jones was born on March 31, 1934, in Charleroi, Pennsylvania, to Methodist parents Marjorie (née Williams), and Paul Jones, owner of the Jones Brewing Company. Jones' paternal grandfather came from Wales. She was named after child star Shirley Temple.

Jones says that many people have incorrectly assumed that her middle name referred to vaudeville and film legend Mae West, but Jones was actually named after her aunt. The first star Jones ever met was West, who was performing at the Twin Coaches supper club in Rostraver around 1954.

The Jones family later moved to the small nearby town of Smithton. Jones began singing at the age of six in the Methodist Church choir and took voice lessons from Ralph Lewando. While attending South Huntingdon High School in Ruffs Dale, she participated in school plays. Jones won the Miss Pittsburgh contest in 1952.

== Career ==
=== Early stage career ===
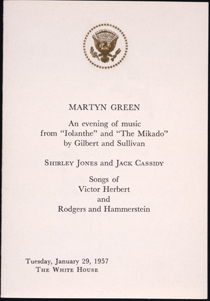
A program featuring Shirley Jones and Jack Cassidy at the White House in 1957

Her first audition was for an open bi-weekly casting call held by John Fearnley, casting director for Rodgers and Hammerstein and their various musicals. At the time, Jones had never heard of Rodgers and Hammerstein. Fearnley was so impressed, he ran across the street to fetch Richard Rodgers, who was rehearsing with an orchestra for an upcoming musical. Rodgers then called Oscar Hammerstein at home.

The two saw great potential in Jones. She became the first and only singer to be put under personal contract with the songwriters. They first cast her in a minor role in South Pacific. For her second Broadway show, Me and Juliet, she started as a chorus girl, and then an understudy for the lead role, earning rave reviews in Chicago, Illinois.

=== Movie actress ===
Jones impressed Rodgers and Hammerstein with her musically trained voice. She was cast as the female lead in the film adaptation Oklahoma! in 1955. Other film musicals quickly followed, including Carousel (1956), April Love (1957), and The Music Man (1962), in which she was often typecast as a wholesome, kind character.

She won a 1960 Academy Award for her performance in Elmer Gantry portraying a woman corrupted by the title character played by Burt Lancaster. Her character becomes a prostitute who encounters her seducer years later and reveals his true character. The director, Richard Brooks, had originally fought against her being in the movie, but after seeing her first scene, told her she would win an Oscar for her performance. She was reunited with Ron Howard (who had played her brother in The Music Man) in The Courtship of Eddie's Father (1963). With an uncharacteristically brunette hairstyle, Jones played the role of a woman who falls in love with Tony Randall's lion-owning professor in Fluffy (1965).

In her film career, she has worked with some of Hollywood's icons: Jimmy Stewart, Gene Kelly, Marlon Brando, James Cagney, Henry Fonda, Frank Sinatra, Dean Martin and director John Ford.

=== The Partridge Family ===
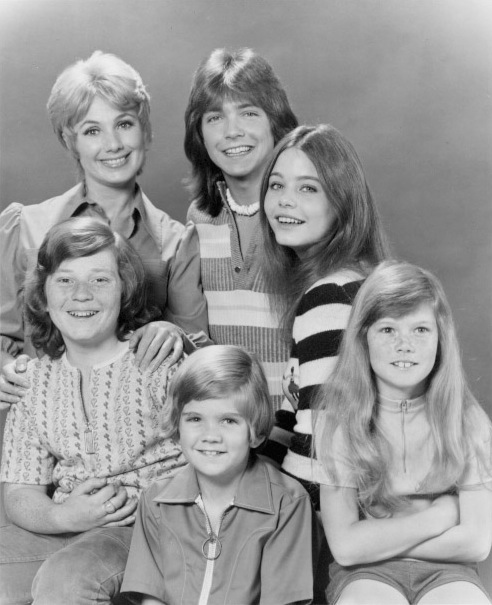
Jones with fellow cast members of The Partridge Family in 1972

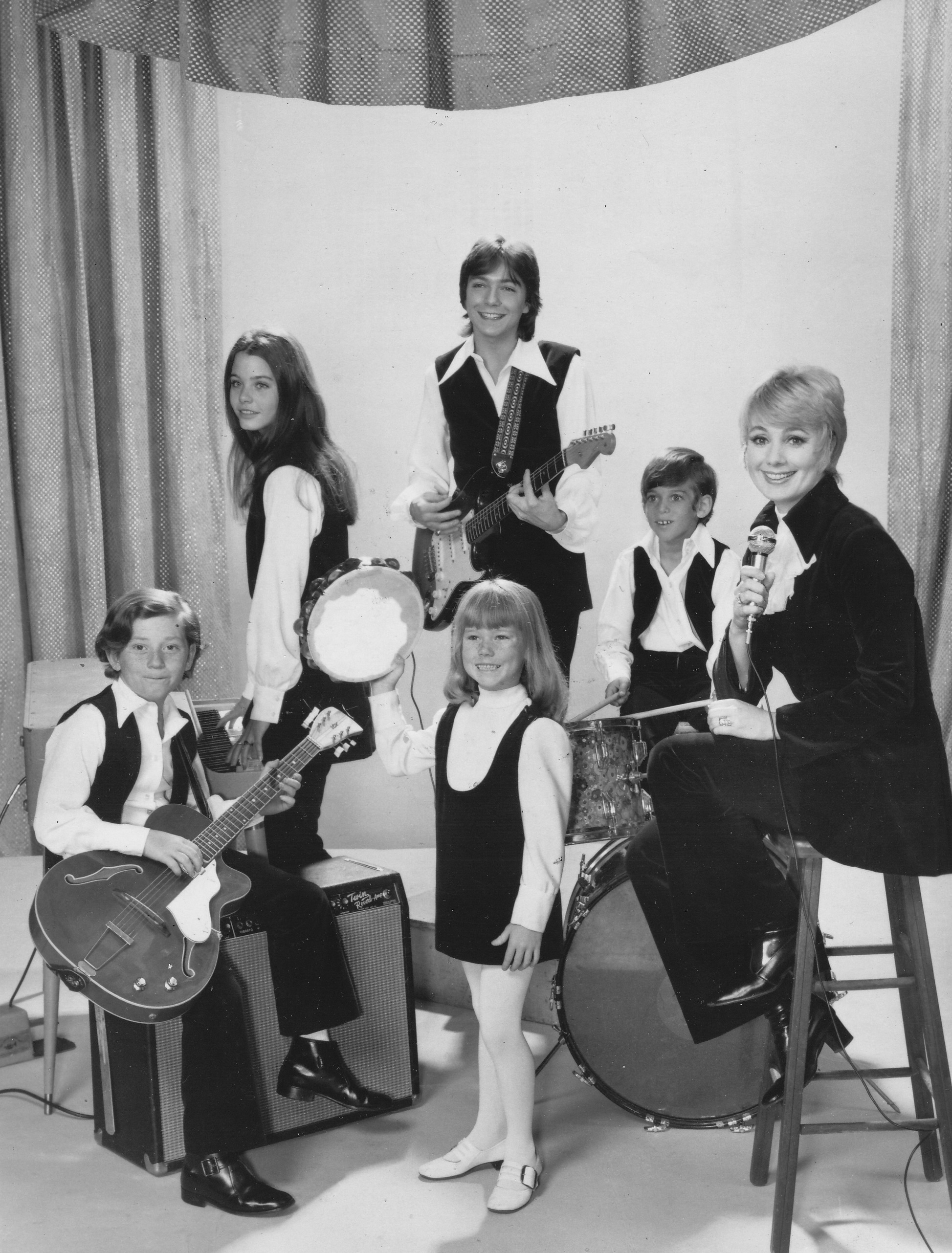
The Partridge Family, season 1

In 1970, after turning down the role of Carol Brady on The Brady Bunch, a role that ultimately went to her best friend, Florence Henderson, Jones was the producers' first choice to audition for the lead role of Shirley Partridge in The Partridge Family, an ABC musical sitcom based loosely on the real-life musical family The Cowsills. The series focused on a young widowed mother whose five children form a pop-rock group after the entire family painted its signature bus to travel. She was convinced that the combination of music and comedy would be a surefire hit.

Jones realized, however, that:

The problem with Partridge—though it was great for me and gave me an opportunity to stay home and raise my kids—when my agents came to me and presented it to me, they said if you do a series and it becomes a hit show, you will be that character for the rest of your life and your film career will go into the toilet, which is what happened. But I have no regrets.

During its first season, the series became a hit and was screened in over 70 countries. Within months, Jones and her co-stars were pop culture television icons. Her 20-year-old stepson David Cassidy, who was an unknown actor at the time, played Shirley Partridge's eldest son Keith and became a teen idol.

The show also spawned a number of albums and singles by The Partridge Family, performed by David Cassidy and Shirley Jones. That same year, their single "I Think I Love You" reached number one on the Billboard Hot 100 music chart, making Jones the second person, after Frank Sinatra, and the first woman to win an acting Oscar and also have a number-one hit on that chart. Her achievement was matched only by Cher and Barbra Streisand. The Partridge Family won a NARM award for the best-selling single of the year in 1970 for their hit "I Think I Love You". In 1971, The Partridge Family was nominated for a Grammy under the Best New Artist category.

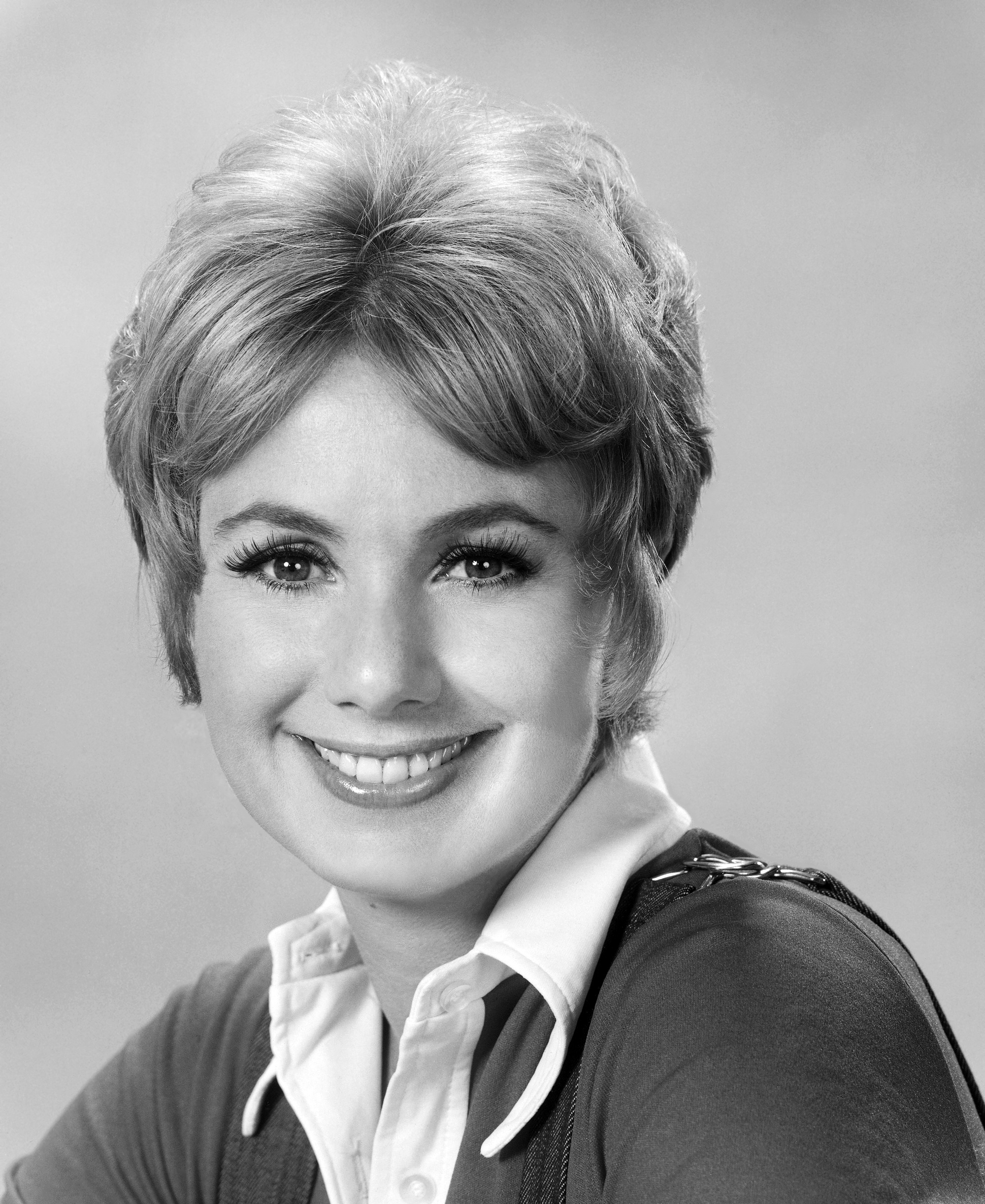
Jones in 1972

The series' run ended in 1974.

Shirley Jones's friendship with David Cassidy had begun in the mid-to-late 1950s, when David was just six, after he learned about his father's divorce from his mother Evelyn Ward. Upon David's first meeting with Shirley before co-starring with her on The Partridge Family, he said, "The day he tells me that they're divorced, he tells me, 'We're remarried, and let me introduce you to my new wife.' He was thrilled when her first film, Oklahoma! (1955), had come out; and my dad took me to see it—I just see her, and I go, uh-oh, it doesn't really quite register with me, 'cause I'm in total shock, because I wanted to hate her, but the instant that I met her, I got the essence of her. She's a very warm, open, sweet, good human being. She couldn't have thawed it for me—the coldness and the ice—any more than she did."

Shirley was shocked to hear her stepson was going to audition for the role of Keith Partridge. David said, "At the auditions, they introduced me to the lead actress [Shirley Jones] 'cause they had no idea, they had no idea. So I said, 'What are you doing here?' She looked at me and said, 'What are you doing here?' And I said, 'Well, I'm reading for the lead guy.' I said, 'What are you doing here?' She said, 'I'm the mother!'" Cassidy discussed his relationship with his stepmother on the show: "She wasn't my mother, and I can be very open, and we can speak, and we became very close friends. She was a very good role model for me, watching the way, you know, she dealt with people on the set, and watching people revere her."

Cassidy appeared on many shows alongside his stepmother, including A&E Biography, TV Land Confidential, and The Today Show. He was one of the presenters of his stepmother's Intimate Portrait on Lifetime Television, and the reality show pilot In Search of the Partridge Family, where he served as co-executive producer. The rest of the cast also celebrated the 25th, 30th, and 35th anniversaries of The Partridge Family (although Cassidy was unavailable to attend the 25th anniversary in 1995 owing to other commitments). Jack Cassidy's death in 1976 drew Jones and Cassidy closer, as Shirley's three children and stepson mourned their father.

=== Shirley and other projects ===
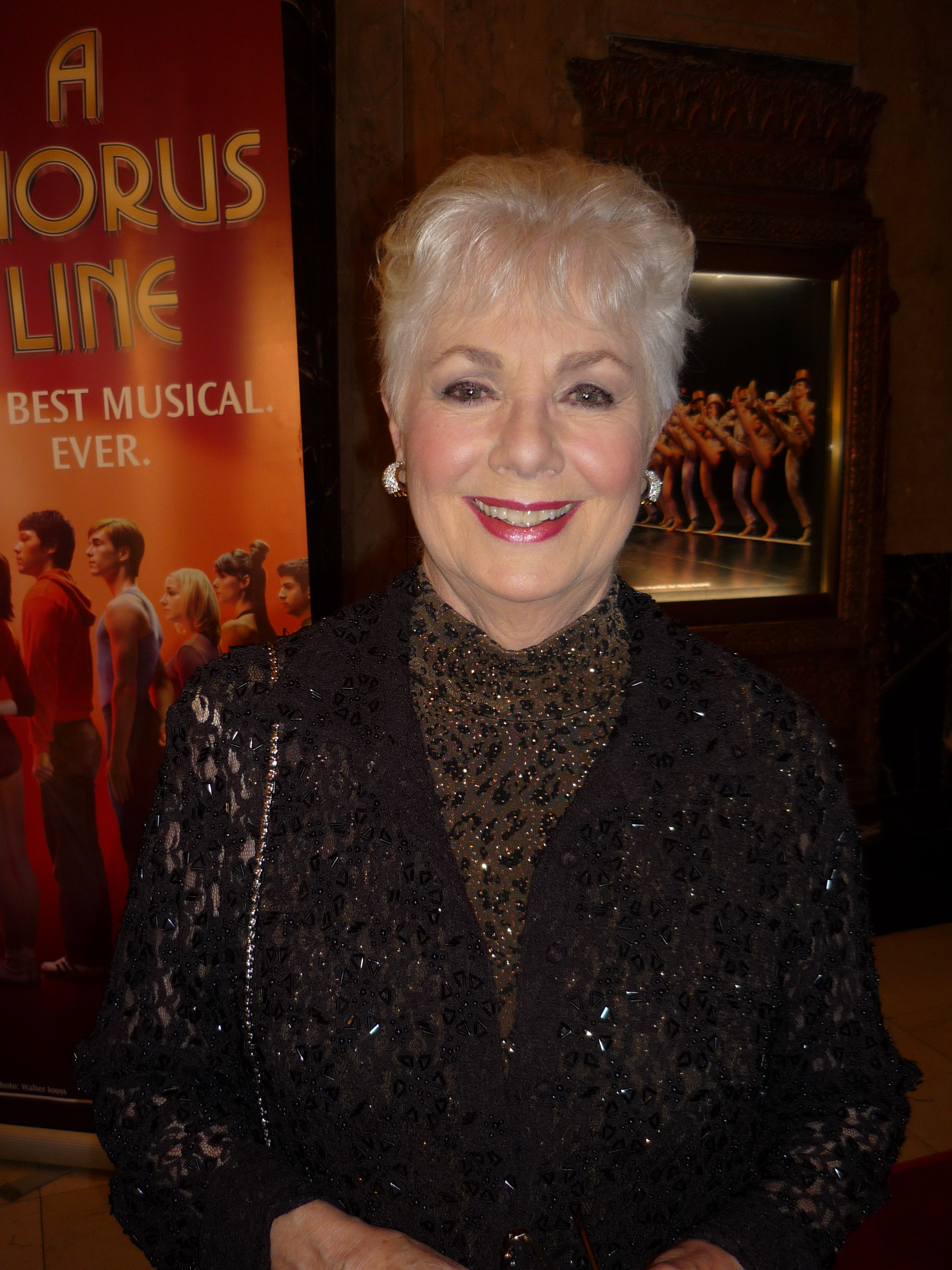
Jones in 2010

In 1975, Jones starred in Winner Take All as a compulsive gambler who wrecks her marriage by stealing from her husband and by eventually cheating on him with her bookie. In 1979, Jones tried her hand at television for the second time, starring in the NBC show Shirley, which, like The Partridge Family, featured a family headed by a widowed mother. It failed to win ratings and was cancelled toward the middle of the season. Jones also played the "older woman" girlfriend of Drew Carey's character in several episodes of The Drew Carey Show. She reprised Shirley Partridge in a cameo in a 2000 episode of That '70s Show.

She was also in the dramatic project There Were Times, Dear, in which she played a loyal wife whose husband is dying of Alzheimer's disease. She was nominated for an Emmy Award for this work.

In February 1986, Jones unveiled her star on the Hollywood Walk of Fame on Vine Street just around the corner from Hollywood Boulevard.

In 1983, she appeared in a rare revival of Noël Coward's operetta, Bitter Sweet. In 2004, she returned to Broadway in a revival of 42nd Street, portraying diva Dorothy Brock opposite Patrick Cassidy, the first time a mother and son were known to star together on Broadway. In July 2005, Jones revisited the musical Carousel onstage in Massachusetts, portraying "Cousin Nettie".

Jones appeared as aunt of a struggling widow during the Great Depression, in Hallmark Channel's Hidden Places in 2006. She received an Emmy Award nomination for Supporting Actress, Miniseries or Movie, and the Screen Actors Guild Award for Actress in a Movie or Miniseries. She also appeared in Grandma's Boy (2006) as a nymphomaniac senior citizen.

On November 16, 2007, she took the stage at the Ford Center in Oklahoma City, Oklahoma, during the Oklahoma Centennial Spectacular concert that celebrated the state's 100th birthday. Jones sang the songs "Oklahoma!" and "People Will Say We're In Love" from the musical Oklahoma!.

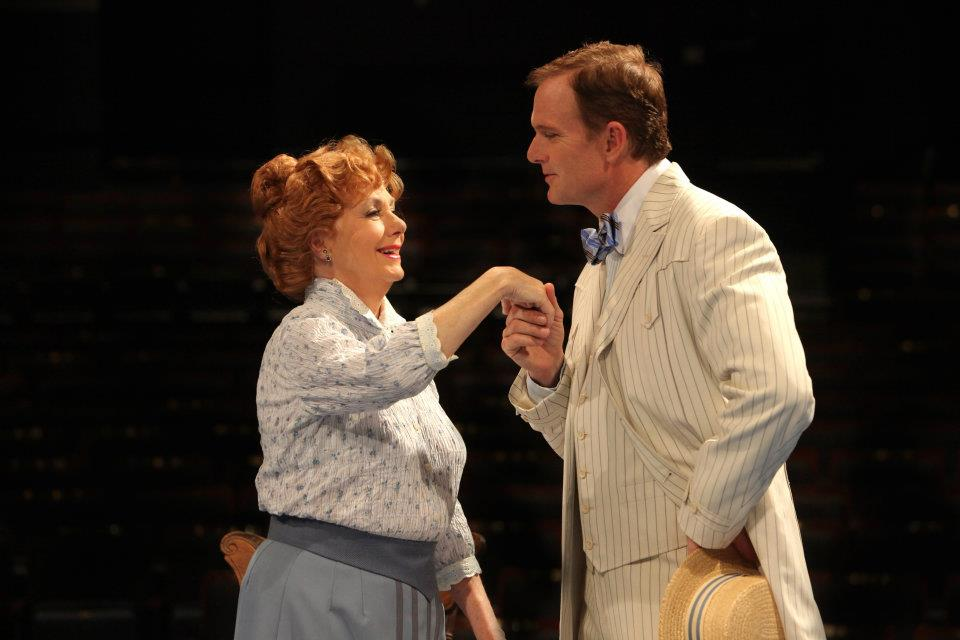
Jones and Patrick Cassidy in 2012

In early 2008, it was announced that Jones would play Colleen Brady on the long-running NBC soap opera Days of Our Lives. ABC Family series Ruby & The Rockits featured Jack and Patrick Cassidy. Jones guest-starred as their mother.

In 2008, U.K. label Stage Door Records released the retrospective collection Then & Now featuring 24 songs from Jones's musical career, including songs from the films Oklahoma!, Carousel, and April Love. The album featured new recordings of songs including "Beauty and the Beast", "Memory", and a sentimental tribute to The Music Man. She had a recurring role as Burt Chance's mother in the Fox TV comedy series Raising Hope.

In mid-2012, Jones played Mrs. Paroo, when her son Patrick played Harold Hill, in a California Musical Theatre revival of The Music Man.

In 2014, Jones guest-starred on an episode of General Hospital as Mrs. McClain.

== Personal life ==
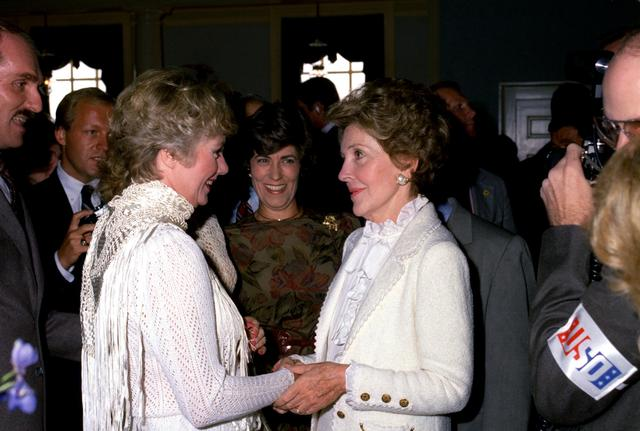
Jones (left) with U.S. First Lady Nancy Reagan, September 29, 1982

On August 5, 1956, Jones married actor and singer Jack Cassidy. They had three sons, Shaun, Patrick, and Ryan. David Cassidy was Jack's son from his first marriage to actress Evelyn Ward and became her stepson. Jones divorced Cassidy in 1975.

Cassidy died in a fire on December 12, 1976. Jack "wanted to come back (to me) right up to the day he died", Jones said in a 1983 newspaper interview. "And as I realized later, I wanted him. That's the terrible part. Much as I love Marty and have a wonderful relationship—I'd say this with Marty sitting here—I'm not sure if Jack were alive I'd be married to Marty." Jones was 20 years old when she met Cassidy, and she refers to him as the most influential person in and the love of her life.

On November 13, 1977, Jones married actor and comedian Marty Ingels. Jones and Ingels wrote an autobiography based on their relationship called Shirley & Marty: An Unlikely Love Story. Despite what Ingels called having an “odd-couple relationship” and separations (she filed, then withdrew, a divorce petition in 2002), they remained married until Ingels' death on October 21, 2015, from a massive stroke. After his death, Jones said: "He often drove me crazy, but there's not a day I won't miss him and love him to my core."

Jones is a supporter of PETA.

Jones was devastated when Suzanne Crough died on April 27, 2015; Crough played one of her TV daughters on The Partridge Family.

== Filmography ==
=== Film ===
Year	Title	Role	Notes
1955	Oklahoma!	Laurey Williams	
1956	Carousel	Julie Jordan	
1957	April Love	Liz Templeton	Laurel Award for Top Female Musical Performance (5th place)
1959	Never Steal Anything Small	Linda Cabot	Laurel Award for Top Female Musical Performance (3rd place)
1959	Bobbikins	Betty Barnaby	
1960	Elmer Gantry	Lulu Bains	Academy Award for Best Supporting Actress; Laurel Award for Top Female Supporting Performance; National Board of Review Award for Best Supporting Actress; Nominated-Golden Globe Award for Best Supporting Actress – Motion Picture
1960	Pepe	Suzie Murphy	
1961	Two Rode Together	Marty Purcell	
1962	The Music Man	Marian Paroo	Laurel Award for Top Female Musical Performance (3rd place); Nominated-Golden Globe Award for Best Actress – Motion Picture Musical or Comedy
1963	The Courtship of Eddie's Father	Elizabeth Martan	
1963	A Ticklish Affair	Amy Martin	
1964	Dark Purpose	Karen Williams	
1964	Bedtime Story	Janet Walker	
1965	Fluffy	Janice Claridge	
1965	The Secret of My Success	Marigold Marido	
1969	The Happy Ending	Flo Harrigan	Reunited with her Elmer Gantry co-star Jean Simmons
1969	El Golfo	Mary O'Hara	
1970	The Cheyenne Social Club	Jenny	
1979	Beyond the Poseidon Adventure	Nurse Gina Rowe	
1984	Tank	LaDonna Carey	
1999	Gideon	Elly Morton	
2000	The Adventures of Cinderella's Daughter	Fairy Godmother	
2000	Ping!	Ethel Jeffries	
2000	Shriek If You Know What I Did Last Friday the Thirteenth	Nurse Kervorkian	
2002	Manna from Heaven	Bunny	
2004	The Creature of the Sunny Side Up Trailer Park	Charlotte	
2004	Raising Genius	Aunt Sis	
2006	Grandma's Boy	Grace	
2007	Christmas Is Here Again	Victoria Claus	Voice
2013	Family Weekend	GG	
2013	A Strange Brand of Happy	Mildred	
2013	Zombie Night	Nana	
2014	Waiting in the Wings: The Musical	Broadway Diva	
2016	The Irresistible Blueberry Farm	Ruth	Hallmark Movies & Mysteries
2018	Eco-Teens Save The World	Senator Jeremy Ryburn's Mother	Limited release in 2015 as On the Wing

=== Television ===
- 1950: Fireside Theatre (acting debut)
- 1952: Gruen Guild Playhouse
- 1956: Ford Star Jubilee
- 1956: Playhouse 90
- 1957: Lux Video Theatre
- 1957: The Pat Boone Chevy Showroom (guest)
- 1957: The United States Steel Hour
- 1958: DuPont Show of the Month
- 1959: Make Room for Daddy (as herself)
- 1964: Bob Hope Presents the Chrysler Theatre
- 1969: Silent Night, Lonely Night
- 1969: The Carol Burnett Show
- 1969: The Name of the Game
- 1970–74: The Partridge Family
- 1971: Curiosity Shop (Episode: The Curiosity Shop Special)
- 1973: The Girls of Huntington House
- 1975: The Family Nobody Wanted
- 1975: The Lives of Jenny Dolan
- 1975: Winner Take All
- 1977: McMillan & Wife
- 1977: Yesterday's Child
- 1978: Evening in Byzantium
- 1978: Who'll Save Our Children?
- 1979: A Last Cry for Help
- 1979–80: Shirley
- 1980: The Children of An Lac
- 1981: Inmates: A Love Story
- 1982: The Adventures of Pollyanna
- 1983: Hotel (pilot).
- 1983/87: Hotel
- 1983: The Love Boat
- 1985: There Were Times, Dear
- 1988/90: Murder, She Wrote
- 1989: Charlie (unsold pilot)
- 1997: Dog's Best Friend
- 1998: Melrose Place
- 1998: The Drew Carey Show
- 1999: Sabrina the Teenage Witch
- 2000: That '70s Show (cameo)
- 2003: Law & Order: Special Victims Unit
- 2006: Hidden Places
- 2006: Monarch Cove
- 2008: Days of Our Lives
- 2009: Ruby & the Rockits
- 2011/14: Raising Hope (3 episodes)
- 2012: Good Luck Charlie (Episodes: "Welcome Home", "A Duncan Christmas")
- 2012: Victorious (Episode: "Car, Rain, and Fire")
- 2013: Cougar Town
- 2013: Hot in Cleveland
- 2014: General Hospital
- 2014: Over the Garden Wall (voice)
- 2016: Childrens Hospital (cameo as herself)

=== Stage ===
- 1953: South Pacific (Broadway)
- 1954: Me and Juliet (Chicago)
- 1956: Oklahoma! (European tour with Jack Cassidy)
- 1957: The Beggar's Opera (with Cassidy)
- 1959: Wish You Were Here! (Dallas State Fair Theater, with Cassidy)
- 1966: The Sound of Music (Westbury Music Fair)
- 1967: Wait Until Dark (with Cassidy)
- 1968: Maggie Flynn (Broadway, with Cassidy)
- 1972: The Marriage Band (with Cassidy)
- 1974: On a Clear Day You Can See Forever
- 1976: Show Boat
- 1977: The Sound of Music
- 1982: Bitter Sweet
- 1994: Love Letters (with Marty Ingels)
- 1994: The King and I
- 1994: A Christmas Carol
- 1995: Love Letters (with Marty Ingels)
- 2004: 42nd Street (Broadway, with Patrick Cassidy)
- 2005: Carousel
- 2012: The Music Man (Sacramento Music Circus, with Patrick Cassidy)

== Discography ==
=== Shirley Jones and Jack Cassidy albums ===
- Speaking of Love (1957) (Columbia Records)
- Brigadoon (1957) (Columbia Records)
- With Love from Hollywood (1958) (Columbia Records)
- Marriage Type Love (1959) (RCA Records, unreleased)
- Maggie Flynn (1968) (RCA Records)
- Show Tunes (1995) (Sony Music)
- Essential Masters (2011) (Master Classics Records)
- Marriage Type Love (2014) (Columbia Masterworks)

=== The Partridge Family albums ===
- The Partridge Family Album (1970) (Bell Records)
- Up to Date (1971) (Bell Records)
- Sound Magazine (1971) (Bell Records)
- A Partridge Family Christmas Card (1971) (Bell Records)
- Shopping Bag (1972) (Bell Records)
- At Home with Their Greatest Hits (1972) (Bell Records)
- Notebook (1972) (Bell Records)
- Crossword Puzzle (1973) (Bell Records)
- Bulletin Board (1973) (Bell Records)
- The World of the Partridge Family (1974) (Bell Records)
- Greatest Hits (1989) (Arista Records)
- The Definitive Collection (2001) (Arista Records)
- Come On Get Happy!: The Very Best of The Partridge Family (2005) (Arista Records)

=== The Partridge Family singles ===
- "I Think I Love You" (1970) (Bell Records)
- "Doesn't Somebody Want to Be Wanted" (1971) (Bell Records)
- "I'll Meet You Halfway" (1971) (Bell Records)
- "I Woke Up In Love This Morning" (1971) (Bell Records)
- "It's One of Those Nights (Yes Love)" (1972) (Bell Records)
- "Am I Losing You" (1972) (Bell Records)
- "Breaking Up Is Hard to Do" (1972) (Bell Records)
- "Looking Through the Eyes of Love" (1972) (Bell Records)
- "Friend and a Lover" (1973) (Bell Records)
- "Walking in the Rain" (1973) Bell Records
- "Looking for a Good Time" (1973) (Bell Records)

=== Shirley Jones albums ===
- Silent Strength (1989) (Diadem Records)
- Shirley (1992) (A & M Records)
- Shirley Jones (2000) (Ingels Ent. Records)
- Then & Now (2008) (Stage Door Records)
- A Touch of Christmas (2009) (Encore Music Presents Records)
- A Tribute to Richard Rodgers (2010) (Encore Music Presents Records)

=== Shirley Jones singles ===
- "Clover in the Meadow" b/w "Give me a Gentle Girl" (1957) (Dot Records) from April Love movie soundtrack
- "Pepe" b/w "Lovely Day" (1960) (Colpix Records) from Pepe movie soundtrack (This record hit the top 5 in Spain, 1961, on the Discophon label)
- "I've Still Got My Heart Joe" b/w "Everybody's Reachin' Out for Someone" (1971) (Bell Records 119)
- "Ain't Love Easy" b/w "Roses in the Snow" (1972) (Bell Records 253)
- "Walk in Silence" b/w "The World is a Circle" (1973) (Bell Records 350)

=== Soundtracks ===
- Oklahoma! (1955) (Capitol Records) (songs: "The Surrey with the Fringe on Top", "Many a New Day", "People Will Say We're in Love", "Out of My Dreams", "Oklahoma")
- Carousel (1956) (Capitol Records) (songs: "You're a Queer One, Julie Jordan", "If I Loved You", "What's the Use of Wond'rin", "You'll Never Walk Alone")
- April Love (1957) (Dot Records) (songs: "Give Me a Gentle Girl", "April Love" with Pat Boone, "Do It Yourself" with Pat Boone, "The Bentonville Fair" with Pat Boone, "Finale" with Pat Boone)
- Never Steal Anything Small (1959) (song: "I Haven't Got a Thing to Wear")
- Pepe (1960) Colpix Records (songs: "Pepe", "Lovely Day")
- The Music Man (1962) (Warner Bros. Records) (songs: "Piano Lesson / If You Don't Mind My Saying So", "Goodnight, My Someone", "Being in Love", "Lida Rose/Will I Ever Tell You", "Till There Was You")
- Endless Night (1972) (song: "Endless Night")
- Manna from Heaven (2002) (song: "Just the Way You Look Tonight")
- Christmas Is Here Again (2007) (songs: "Easy To Dream", "All Because of Me")
- Over the Garden Wall (2014) (song: "One Is a Bird")

=== Album appearances ===
- Free to Be... You and Me (1972) (Bell Records) (song: "Girl Land" with Jack Cassidy)
- The Christmas Album.....A Gift of Hope (1991) Children's Hospital Benefit Album (song: "Silver Bells" with Shaun Cassidy)
- An Evening with Rodgers & Hammerstein, The Sullivan Years (1993) TVT Records
- Embraceable You – Broadway In Love (1993) (Sony Music)
- George & Ira Gershwin, A Musical Celebration (1994) (MCA Records) (song: "Someone to watch over Me")
- Lerner, Loewe, Lane & Friends (1998) Varèse Sarabande Records (song: "Before I Gaze at You Again")
