= Cathal Dunne =

Irish singer

- Born: Cathal Dunne; 14 February 1951 (age 75); Cork, Ireland
- Genres: Pop, pop-rock, MOR, Trad. Irish
- Instruments: Vocals
- Years active: 1971–present
- Labels: CBS, Rex, EMI, Blarney
- Website: http://www.cahaldunne.com

Cathal Dunne (born 14 February 1951) is an Irish singer. He is most famous for representing Ireland in the Eurovision Song Contest 1979 with the song "Happy Man". He has since gained a following as Cahal Dunne, performing traditional Irish songs in the United States, where he now lives.

== Background ==
Born in Cork, Ireland, Dunne is the nephew of Jack Lynch who served as Taoiseach in the 1960s and 1970s. In 1974 he graduated from University College Cork and Montfort College of Performing Arts after studying music. That same year he won the Castlebar Song Contest with the song "Shalom". Two years later he represented Ireland at the Yamaha Music Festival with his own composition "Lover, Not a Wife". Also in 1976 he released a single, "Bad Boy" as well as his first top ten hit in Ireland, "Danny". During these years he played with his backing band, Stateside (and later, The Formula), on the Irish club circuit. In 1981, he released "We'll be there", a song for Fianna Fáil's 1981 general election campaign.

== Eurovision ==
In 1979 he entered his own composition "Happy Man" into the Irish National Song Contest. Competing against former Irish Eurovision entrants Tina Reynolds and Red Hurley and future winner Johnny Logan, he won the contest easily with 36 points and thus gained the right to represent Ireland at the Eurovision Song Contest 1979. Performing in Jerusalem at the final in March, he achieved a respectable fifth place with 80 points. The single went on to sell well in Europe and reached No.3 in the Irish charts. The song was produced by Nicky Graham.

== Emigration ==
In February 1982 he played some concerts in Michigan in the United States. These tempted him to move there permanently and the following year, Dunne emigrated from Ireland. Since then, Dunne has made a name for himself as a singer of traditional Irish ballads and has released a number of albums. He has also performed comedy routines and show tunes.

== Personal life ==
Dunne now lives in Pittsburgh, Pennsylvania with his wife, Kathleen and son, Ryan.

== Discography ==
Singles

- 1971 "Butterfly" (The Montford Singers with Cathal Dunne) (Pye Records)
- 1974 "Babaró" (Séan O Sé and Cathal Dunne) (Gael Linn Records)
- 1974 "Shalom" (Rex Records)
- 1974 "Hey Noddy Day" (Rex)
- 1976 "Danny" (EMI Records) (IRL #8)
- 1976 "Bad Boy" (EMI)
- 1978 "Suspicious Minds" (Cathal Dunne and Stateside) (Bandbox Records)
- 1979 "Happy Man" (CBS Records) (IRL #3)
- 1980 "The Time for Talkin' is Over" (Cathal Dunne and The Formula) (Nocturne Records)
- 1980 "The Feeling's Gone" (Nocturne)
- 1981 "Bad Boy" (Cathal Dunne and The Formula) (Nocturne)

Albums

- 1977 Bad Boy (EMI)
- 1980 That Time in Stockholm (GoodWill Records)
- 1985 Thinkin' Love Tonite (Blarney Records)
- 1996 Peace in My Land (Rego Irish)
- 1997 The Best of Cahal Dunne (EJ Farrell Music)
- 1997 After All These Years (EJ Farrell)
- 2001 Songs of Inspiration (Rego Irish)
- 2001 The Christmas Album (Rego Irish)
- 2004 What Color is the Wind
- 2005 Salute to Broadway
- 2006 The Menopause Song
- 2007 A Little Bit of Irish
- 2008 Shamrocks and Heather
- 2009 Dunne Gone Country
- 2011 Ireland's Golden Treasures

Awards and achievements
Preceded by Colm Wilkinson with "Born to Sing"	Ireland in the Eurovision Song Contest; 1979	Succeeded by Johnny Logan with "What's Another Year"
