= Hugh Wooldridge =

English director, producer and writer (1952–2026)

- Born: 18 August 1952; Amersham, Buckinghamshire, England
- Died: 3 October 2026 (aged 74)
- Education: London Academy of Music and Dramatic Art
- Occupations: Theatre director, theatre and television producer and writer, and stage lighting designer
- Parents: John Wooldridge (father); Margaretta Scott (mother)
- Relatives: Susan Wooldridge (sister)

Hugh Wooldridge (18 August 1952 – 3 October 2026) was an English theatre director, theatre and television producer and writer, and stage lighting designer. He later specialised in large productions, often at the Royal Albert Hall, London. He also taught, giving master-classes and running workshops.

== Background and career ==
Hugh Wooldridge was born in Amersham, Buckinghamshire on 18 August 1952, the son of British composer John Wooldridge and actress Margaretta Scott. He was also the brother of actress Susan Wooldridge.

After attending Stonyhurst College in Lancashire, Wooldridge trained at the London Academy of Music and Dramatic Art, then assisted directors including Alan Ayckbourn, Eric Thompson, Frank Hauser and Michael Blakemore. He directed his first play at the age of sixteen. In the first ten years of his career he directed more than sixty productions in London and throughout the UK, by authors including Alan Ayckbourn, René de Obaldia, Pam Gems and Athol Fugard. He was a resident director at the Haymarket Theatre, Leicester, the Thorndike Theatre, Leatherhead, and The Old Vic, London. In 1980 he co-devised with James and Edward Duke Jeeves Takes Charge by PG Wodehouse. He produced, directed and lit the world premiere production performed by Edward Duke at the Lyric Theatre, Hammersmith.

During the next ten years Wooldridge ran his own multi-media company, The Jolly Good Production Company (JGPC), which produced plays and television programmes, managed artistes and published books. During this time he was also responsible for music programmes and programming in the ITV network in the south and south east of England. He also directed international tours of Jesus Christ Superstar and The Rocky Horror Show, as well as national tours of plays by Noël Coward, Dylan Thomas and Daphne du Maurier. In 1993/4, Wooldridge adapted and directed the famous Daphne du Maurier novel Rebecca; an all-star production which opened at the Theatre Royal, Lincoln, and toured widely across the UK.

Wooldridge died on 3 October 2026, aged 74.

== Credits ==
Each year from 1999 Wooldridge produced, devised and directed The Night of 1000 Voices at the Royal Albert Hall. The production featured amongst others Michael Ball, Brent Barrett, Len Cariou, Glenn Close, Michael Crawford, Kerry Ellis, David Essex, Maria Friedman, Joel Grey, Brian May, Caroline O'Connor, Adam Pascal, Philip Quast, and Sally Ann Triplett, and the works of Cy Coleman, George and Ira Gershwin, Lerner and Lowe, Tim Rice, Alain Boublil and Claude-Michel Schönberg, Stephen Sondheim, and songs from the productions of Richard Eyre, Nicholas Hytner, Cameron Mackintosh, Trevor Nunn, Tim Rice and Andrew Lloyd Webber.

- 1995: Devised and directed A Gala Concert for Hal Prince at the Gasteig in Munich
- 1996: Devised and directed the Richard Rodgers Award for Excellence in Musical Theater celebrating Andrew Lloyd Webber for the Pittsburgh Civic Light Opera
- 1996: Devised and directed Who Could Ask for Anything More?, the centenary celebration of Ira Gershwin, at the Royal Albert Hall
- 1997: Created and co-directed with Trevor Nunn and Andrew Davis The Golden Anniversary – a private event celebrating the Golden Wedding Anniversary of The Queen and The Duke of Edinburgh (Royal Festival Hall)
- 1999: Devised and directed Sondheim Tonight in New York and London
- 2007: Devised and directed Kander & Ebb - Night Of 1000 Voices at the Royal Albert Hall, London, 6 May 2007.
- 2008: Co-adapted with Tim Rice and directed Chess in Concert at the Royal Albert Hall with Josh Groban, Idina Menzel, Adam Pascal, Marti Pellow, Cantabile ,Kerry Ellis and Clarke Peters, introduced by Tim Rice
- 2009: Directed the Christmas shows of the UK vocal group Cantabile at the Delfont Room, Prince of Wales Theatre and St. John's, Smith Square

Productions at the Royal Albert Hall:

- 2011: Kerry Ellis and Brian May's show Anthems: The Concert, for the benefit of Leukaemia & Lymphoma Research, Winner of WhatsOnStage.com Best Solo Performance; also devised and directed
- 2011: The Wonderful World of Captain Beaky and His Band, (featuring the words of Jeremy Lloyd and the music of Jim Parker with Sir Roger Moore, Vanessa Redgrave, Hugh Bonneville, Joanna Lumley, Duncan Bannatyne and Alan Titchmarsh amongst others), in aid of Unicef; also devised and directed
- 2012: The Night of 1000 Voices celebrating The Music of the Knights introduced by Hugh Bonneville (with Brent Barrett, Daniel Boys, Kerry Ellis, Yngve Gasoy Romdal, Bonnie Langford, Peter Polycarpou, Clive Rowe, Sally Ann Triplett and others); also devised and directed
- 2012: Seasons of Love, for Leukaemia & Lymphoma Research, celebrating the real-life Calendar Girls. (featuring Tim Firth, Willy Russell, John Alderton, Celia Imrie, Patricia Hodge, Sue Holderness, Janie Dee, Stephen Tompkinson, Lesley Joseph, Christopher Timothy, Julie Walters amongst others); also devised and directed
- 2013: The Night of 1000 Stars celebrating Harold 'Hal' Prince with Len Cariou; also devised and directed

Between 2010 and 2012 Hugh Wooldridge directed three tours of the play The Haunting, based on stories by Charles Dickens, for Bill Kenwright Ltd.

In 2011/2 Hugh Wooldridge was the Beatrice Carr and Ray Wallace Visiting Professor at A. Max Weitzenhoffer College of Fine Arts at the University of Oklahoma, where he directed the revival of his 1989 production, The Music of Andrew Lloyd Webber.

In 2016, he directed a production of Twist of Lemmon at The Other Palace, London with Christopher Lemmon portraying his father, Jack Lemmon. In 2017 he conceived, wrote and directed a production for the Young Artists of America celebrating the songs of Tim Rice, hosted by Sir Tim, The Circle of Life, which was first seen at the Strathmore Center, Maryland and was later aired on PBS in the US. This MPT programme was nominated for three local Emmy Awards – Best Artistic Program, Best Lighting and Best Direction. It won an Emmy Award for Best Lighting.

In 2018 Wooldridge directed Play on Words – a celebration of PG Wodehouse and his fellow Wordsmiths on Broadway – with Hal Cazalet at Live at Zedel/Crazy Coqs and in New York; and another production of Jesus Christ Superstar at Teatru Astra, Gozo/Malta.

During the pandemic of 2020, he produced and directed 28 short films about Osteopathy – Discovering Osteopathy with Barrie Savory, and a season of new play readings, presented live and streamed globally from the Riverside Studios in London – Riverside Reads.

In 2023/4 Hugh Wooldridge produced and directed for Marquee TV A Man For All Time: Shakespeare Masterclass; introduced by Sir Trevor Nunn, with Dame Judi Dench and Roger Allam with two young student actors from RADA and LAMDA, Rowan Robinson and Charlie Norton.

In December/January 2024/5 Hugh Wooldridge directed a brand new production of Jeeves Takes Charge at the Theatre Royal, Bath.

Wooldridge later directed the winner of 2024’s Britain’s Got Talent, Sydnie Christmas, in her first UK tour, which played at large venues across the UK.
