= The Man from Morocco =

1945 film

- Directed by: Mutz Greenbaum
- Written by: Rudolph Cartier; Edward Dryhurst; Margaret Steen; Warwick Ward
- Produced by: Warwick Ward
- Starring: Anton Walbrook; Margaretta Scott; Mary Morris
- Cinematography: Basil Emmott; Geoffrey Faithfull
- Edited by: Flora Newton
- Music by: Mischa Spoliansky
- Production company: Associated British Picture Corporation
- Distributed by: Pathé Pictures
- Release date: 9 April 1945
- Running time: 116 minutes
- Country: United Kingdom
- Language: English

The Man from Morocco is a 1945 British action adventure film directed by Mutz Greenbaum as Max Greene and starring Anton Walbrook, Margaretta Scott and Mary Morris. The film was shot at Welwyn Studios of Associated British.

== Plot ==
A group of men who have spent two years in an internment camp are sent by the Vichy Government to build a railway in the Sahara. One escapes and returns to London to find his lover believes him to be dead and that she is being pursued by his deadliest enemy.

== Cast ==
- Anton Walbrook as Karel Langer
- Margaretta Scott as Manuela de Roya
- Mary Morris as Sarah Duboste
- Reginald Tate as Captain Ricardi
- Peter Sinclair as Jock
- David Horne as Doctor Duboste
- Hartley Power as Colonel Bagley
- Sybille Binder as Erna
- Charles Victor as Bourdille
- Joseph Almas as Franz
- Carl Jaffe as German General
- Orlando Martins as Jeremiah

== Crew ==
- Director: Max Greene
- Production Company: Associated British Picture Corporation
- Producer: Warwick Ward
- Unit Production Manager: Laurie Lawrence
- 1st Assistant Director: Frank Hollands
- 2nd Assistant Director: Gerald Mitchell
