= Margaretta Scott =

British actress (1912–2005)

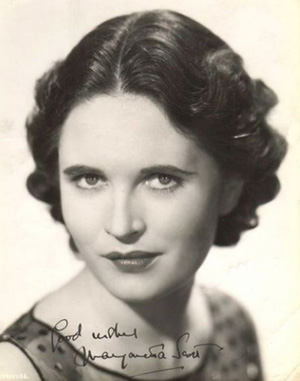
- Born: 13 February 1912; Westminster, London, England
- Died: 15 April 2005 (aged 93); Marylebone, London, England
- Resting place: St Lawrence Churchyard, Cholesbury, Buckinghamshire, England
- Years active: 1926–1997
- Spouse(s): John Wooldridge (m. 1948; died 1958)
- Children: Susan Wooldridge; Hugh Wooldridge
- Parent(s): Hugh Arthur Scott; Bertha Eugene

Margaretta Mary Winifred Scott (13 February 1912 – 15 April 2005) was an English stage, screen and television actress whose career spanned over seventy years. She is best remembered for playing the eccentric widow Mrs. Pumphrey in the BBC television series All Creatures Great and Small (1978–1990).

== Early life ==
Scott was born in London in 1912 to Bertha Eugene and Hugh Arthur Scott, a distinguished music critic. She trained at the Royal Academy of Dramatic Art, where she was a classmate of Celia Johnson.

== Acting career ==
Scott began acting as a child, giving private performances of verse-speaking and dance drama to entertain her family and friends. In 1926, at the age of 14, she made her acting debut on the London stage as Mercutio's Page in a Fellowship of Players revival of Romeo and Juliet. Scott became a leading exponent of the work of William Shakespeare through a series of notable performances in the early and mid-1930s: Cast firstly as the Player Queen and then Ophelia in Hamlet, she followed this with Beatrice in Much Ado About Nothing for the Oxford University Dramatic Society.

She appeared as Viola at the New Theatre and as Ophelia and Juliet in a couple of BBC radio productions in 1932. In 1933 she played the first of four summer seasons at the Open Air Theatre in Regent's Park. She also played Lavinia in George Bernard Shaw's Androcles and the Lion with the rehearsals under the supervision of the author himself.

In 1936 Scott was cast as Rosaline in one of the great productions of Love's Labour's Lost at the Old Vic and in the following year performed in more Shakespeare which included her last appearance at the Open Air Theatre until 1984 in Ring Round the Moon.

In addition to these classical roles, Scott's credits in contemporary drama have included the premieres of Emlyn Williams' A Murder Has Been Arranged (directed by the author in 1930), MacLeish's Panic (1936), Morna Stuart's Traitor's Gate (1938) and Sidney Howard's Alien Corn (1939). By 1939 Scott had become one of the United Kingdom's leading young stage actresses.

=== Trade union organiser ===
Scott was a signatory of the document that established Equity, the British actors' trade union, in 1934.

=== Film career ===
Scott's screen career began in 1934 when she made an uncredited appearance in Alexander Korda's The Private Life of Don Juan. Thereafter she reprised her stage role of Leonora Stafford in the film version of the Ben Travers' Aldwych farce Dirty Work with Robertson Hare and Ralph Lynn and appeared in Herbert Wilcox's Peg of Old Drury with Anna Neagle before again joining Alexander Korda in 1936. Engaged by Korda, Scott made three pictures for London Films:

- Things to Come (1936) as Roxana/Rowana in H. G. Wells' adaptation of his novel with Ralph Richardson, Raymond Massey and Ann Todd.
- Action for Slander (1937).
- Return of the Scarlet Pimpernel (1937).

=== Second World War ===
Throughout the war Scott continued to perform in theatrical productions both at home and abroad, touring North Africa and Italy with ENSA in 1944. In addition to seasons at the Shakespeare Memorial Theatre, Stratford upon Avon in 1941 and 1942, her stage credits included Clare Boothe's Margin for Error (1940), the premiere of James Bridie's The Holy Isle (1942) and the first British productions of Lillian Hellman's play Watch on the Rhine (1943) and John Patrick's The Hasty Heart (1945).

Her screen roles meanwhile included Judith Bentley in The Girl in the News (1940), Marcia Royd in Anthony Asquith's comedy Quiet Wedding (1940), Atlantic Ferry (1941), Sabotage at Sea (1942) and Alicia in the Gainsborough Pictures melodrama, Fanny by Gaslight (1944).

=== Post-war career ===
In the late 1940s and throughout the 1950s Scott continued to play a wide range of roles on stage and screen. Her association with Shakespeare was maintained with performances in the first 1946 television productions of The Merchant of Venice and Othello and, on stage, in Macbeth and Hamlet, in addition to other productions at the Fortune, Saville, Cambridge and Her Majesty's theatres in London. At this time, she appeared in pictures such as The Man from Morocco (1945), Where's Charley? (1952), Town on Trial (1956), The Scamp (1957), and Crescendo (1970).

Scott was active on the concert platform as a narrator/speaker under the batons of Sir Henry Wood, Sir Malcolm Sargent, Sir David Willcocks and Sir John Pritchard performing scores by Grieg, Honegger, Purcell, Elgar, Prokofiev and her late husband, the British composer, John Wooldridge.

Over the course of the next three decades Scott appeared on stage throughout the United Kingdom and toured in plays abroad including the Far East, Canada and North and South Africa. Apart from world premieres of contemporary plays such as Aunt Edwina (1958) with Henry Kendall directed by the author William Douglas Home; The Right Honourable Gentleman (1964) with Anthony Quayle and Angela Huth's The Understanding (1982) with Celia Johnson and Ralph Richardson, many of her theatre credits in the 1960s, 1970s and 1980s were revivals of Oscar Wilde's comedies including Lord Arthur Savile's Crime (1968 Tour); A Woman of No Importance (1974 and 1978); The Importance of Being Earnest (1974 and The Old Vic Theatre 1980; also on television); An Ideal Husband (1976/1977 Tour) and Lady Windermere's Fan (Canada 1979). Her last West End role was with Leo McKern in the revival of Hobson's Choice (1995) directed by Frank Hauser.

=== Television career ===
Scott was one of the first women to perform Shakespeare on television, in the role of Beatrice in a stage production of Much Ado About Nothing broadcast by the BBC in 1937. In 1946, she portrayed Portia in a made for television production of The Merchant of Venice.

For twenty-five years, from the 1970s, Scott played a number of distinguished parts in popular television dramas. These included Lord Peter Wimsey, Elizabeth R, The Duchess of Duke Street, Upstairs, Downstairs, Lovejoy, and for several years as Mrs Pumphrey with her Pekingese, Tricki Woo, in the BBC series All Creatures Great and Small. "Ma was 65 when she was cast as Mrs Pumphrey," explained her daughter, Susan Wooldridge. "At that time in her career she'd been doing various jobs, but nothing particularly sensational. Then suddenly out of the blue, which occasionally happens to us actors, this lovely job came along and it was to be her life really for the next thirteen years. It was very special to her. She loved that part of the country. I think she had real Northern roots in her, and she just loved being up there. We still have 'flop bot' as a family expression."

== Personal life ==
Scott was married to the English composer John Wooldridge, who was killed in a car accident in 1958. Their daughter, Susan Wooldridge, is also an actress and their son, Hugh Wooldridge is a theatre director and producer.

Scott died from pneumonia and breast cancer at her home in London on 15 April 2005, aged 93, and is buried with her husband, John, at St Lawrence's Church, Cholesbury, Buckinghamshire. The headstone lists her as Margaretta Scott Wooldridge.

== Filmography ==
Year	Title	Role	Notes
1934	Dirty Work	Leonora Stafford	
1934	The Private Life of Don Juan	Pepilla	uncredited
1935	Peg of Old Drury	Kitty Clive	
1936	Things to Come	Roxana/Rowena	as Margueretta Scott
1937	Much Ado About Nothing	Beatrice	TV
1937	Return of the Scarlet Pimpernel	Theresa Cobarrus	
1937	Action for Slander	Josie Bradford	
1938	Will Shakespeare	Anne	TV
1938	The Constant Nymph		TV
1938	Parnell	Katherine O'Shea	TV
1939	The Taming of the Shrew	Katherina	TV
1939	Traitor's Gate		TV
1939	Katharine and Petruchio	Katharine	TV
1939	Shall We Join the Ladies?	Lady Wrathie	TV
1940	The Girl in the News	Judith Bentley	
1941	Quiet Wedding	Marcia	
1941	Atlantic Ferry	Susan Donaldson	
1942	Sabotage at Sea	Jane Dighton	
1944	Fanny by Gaslight	Alicia	
1945	The Man from Morocco	Manuela	
1947	Mrs Fitzherbert	Lady Jersey	
1947	The Merchant of Venice	Portia	TV
1948	Counterblast	Sister "Johnnie" Johnson	
1948	The Story of Shirley Yorke	Alison Gwynne	
1948	Idol of Paris	Empress Euginie	
1948	The First Gentleman	Lady Hartford	
1948	Calling Paul Temple	Mrs. Trevellyan	
1949	Landfall	Mrs. Burnaby	
1950	Othello	Emilia	TV – BBC Sunday Night Theatre
1952	Where's Charley?	Dona Lucia	
1956	The White Falcon	Catherine of Aragon	TV – BBC Sunday Night Theatre
1956	The Last Man to Hang?	Mrs. Cranshaw	
1957	The Scamp	Mrs. Blundell	
1957	Town on Trial	Helen Dixon	
1958	A Woman Possessed	Katherine Winthrop	
1960	An Honourable Murder	Claudia Caesar	
1970	Crescendo	Danielle Ryman	
1971	Percy	Rita's Mother	
1978 - 1990	All Creatures Great and Small	Mrs Pumphrey	TV - BBC1
1986	Bergerac	Roberta Jardine	TV – S4E10 "Fires In The Fall"

== Sound recordings ==
Scott's way with Shakespeare can be heard in the Marlowe Society production of The Winter's Tale, in which she played Hermione. She also made audio recordings of poetry by Spenser, Keats, Shelley, Byron and Tennyson.
