= Then & Now (Shirley Jones album) =

Studio album by Shirley Jones
- Released: September 2008
- Recorded: 2008
- Genre: Pop; Traditional pop
- Length: 1:15:06
- Label: Stage Door Records
- Producer: Various

Shirley Jones chronology
| Shirley Jones (2000) | Then & Now (2008) | A Touch of Christmas (2010) |

Then & Now is a studio album by American singer Shirley Jones of The Partridge Family pop music group. The album is a half retrospective collection featuring 14 tracks from her movie musicals while the other 10 tracks are new studio recordings. The album was released in the fall of 2008 on Stage Door Records. Then & Now includes some songs by Shirley Jones from her films Oklahoma!, Carousel and April Love. The album also includes new recordings of songs like "Beauty and the Beast", "Memory" and a tribute to The Music Man.

== Track listing ==
1. "Many a New Day" - 3:09
2. "People Will Say We're in Love" (with Gordon MacRae) - 4:19
3. "Out of My Dreams" - 2:31
4. "If I Loved You"- 6:20
5. "What's the Use of Wonderin'" - 3:29
6. "You'll Never Walk Alone" - 2:00
7. "April Love" (with Pat Boone) - 1:57
8. "Clover in the Meadow" - 2:10
9. "Give Me a Gentle Girl" - 2:19
10. "Waitin' for My Dearie" - 4:24
11. "Almost Like Being in Love" (with Jack Cassidy) - 3:04
12. "A Kiss in the Dark" - 2:10
13. "I'll See You Again" (with Jack Cassidy) - 2:48
14. "I'll Follow My Secret Heart" (with Jack Cassidy) - 2:20
15. "Beauty and the Beast" - 4:14
16. "If I Loved You" - 2:11
17. "Memory" - 4:11
18. "Music Man Introduction" - 0:39
19. "Till There Was You/Goodnight My Someone" - 4:13
20. "Movie Medley: As Time Goes By/Bill/You Made Me Love You" - 5:41
21. "Oklahoma" - 2:19
22. "Oh What a Beautiful Mornin'" - 2:31
23. "People Will Say We're in Love/Out of My Dreams" - 3:51
24. "You'll Never Walk Alone" - 2:16
