= B.J. Crosby =

American singer

- Birth name: Joanne Crayton
- Born: November 23, 1952; New Orleans, Louisiana
- Died: March 27, 2015 (aged 62)
- Occupations: Singer; actress
- Instrument: Vocals

B.J. Crosby, also known as Lady B.J. (born Joanne Crayton; November 23, 1952 – March 27, 2015), was an American jazz vocalist, singer, and actress. In 1995, Crosby received a Tony Award for Best Featured Actress in a Musical nomination for her performance in the musical, Smokey Joe's Cafe. Her role in Smokey Joe's Cafe included solo parts in the songs "Hound Dog" and "Fools Fall in Love".

== Early life and career ==
Crosby was born Joanne Crayton in New Orleans, Louisiana. Crayton began her career by singing in church choirs and local theaters during the 1970s and 1980s. She adopted "B.J. Crosby" and "Lady BJ" as her professional stage names.

Crosby was the lead singer of an R&B and jazz band called Spectrum during the late 1970s. During the mid-1980s, Crosby, Ellis Marsalis Jr., and Germaine Bazzle released an album called The New Orleans Music on Rounder Records. Crosby moved to Los Angeles in 1987 to pursue singing and acting. She worked as a singer of demo versions of songs written by professional songwriters to support herself. In 1995, she moved to New York City, where she appeared in the musical Smokey Joe's Cafe, for which she received a Tony Award nomination in 1995 for Best Featured Actress in a Musical. She appeared on the Smokey Joe's Cafe official Broadway album, which won a Grammy Award. Crosby was also invited to perform "How Long Has This Been Going On?" at the Royal Albert Hall, London for Who Could Ask for Anything More? to mark the centenary of Ira Gershwin's birth in 1996.

Following her success, she returned to Broadway for two more roles. She starred as Matron "Mama" Morton in the 1996 Broadway revival of Chicago and played Ma Reed in the 2002 Broadway debut of One Mo' Time. Her national tours included Dreamgirls, in which she was cast as Effie. Outside of the theater, she had guest roles on Ally McBeal, The Cosby Show, Family Matters, Gimme a Break!, Law & Order, and Mad About You. Her 1984 cable television special, "Lady BJ Sings Lady Day: A Tribute to Billie Holiday", won a CableACE Award.

Crosby released her first solo album, Best of Your Heart, in 2007. Her album was produced by Judge Elloie and included original content and cover versions of songs recorded by Tony Bennett, Betty Carter, Antonio Carlos Jobim, Joe Sample, and Stevie Wonder. In January 2007, she performed as a featured vocalist at a new jazz cafe in Istanbul, Turkey.

== Health and death ==
Crosby moved back to her native New Orleans in 2007. Crosby woke up on June 15, 2008, feeling dizzy and sick, but she still performed at a Father's Day concert at Sydney's club later that night. Two days later, June 17, doctors diagnosed her as having suffered a stroke, which prevented her from singing and decreased mobility on the right side of her body. She never fully regained the use of her singing voice. Crosby was one of only 2 members of the original cast of Smokey Joe's Cafe who could not attend a reunion held at 54 Below in February 2014. Her health declined rapidly during late 2014 and early 2015.

After being hospitalized for three days at Tulane Medical Center in New Orleans, Crosby died on March 27, 2015, aged 62, from complications of diabetes and a stroke. She was survived by her son, Joseph Elloie, and six grandchildren.
