= Michael McCarthy (singer) =

- Born: 5 June 1966 (age 60); Turners Cross, Cork, Ireland
- Genre: Musical theatre
- Occupations: Actor, singer, producer
- Years active: 1981–present
- Label: CD Baby
- Website: michaelmccarthy.net
External videos
- Michael McCarthy performing
- "Within My World" from Dracula, The Musical via YouTube

Michael McCarthy (born 5 June 1966), is an Irish musical theatre performer who is best known for his many appearances as Javert in the musical Les Misérables.

Other musical stage roles have included: Max in Cabaret; Sir Lancelot in Camelot; Thomas Inkle in a 1997 revival of Inkle and Yarico; the Phantom in Ken Hill's Phantom of the Opera; Ivan Molokov in Chess and Sweeney Todd in Sweeney Todd: The Demon Barber of Fleet Street. McCarthy has also performed in operas, such as Rigoletto and dramatic roles including, Marco in A View from the Bridge, and Laurie in Little Women.

He has appeared in a number of high-profile concerts including playing the Factory Foreman in Les Misérables tenth anniversary show, Les Misérables: The Dream Cast in Concert, and as Thomas Inkle in a concert performance of Inkle and Yarico at the Edinburgh Festival. He has recorded three albums Broadway (1994), Living for the Moment (2000), and You're Still You (2012), and a number of his performances have been broadcast by the BBC and PBS.

He continues to perform and runs workshops in performing arts.

== Early life ==
Michael McCarthy was born in Turners Cross, Cork, Ireland on 5 June 1966. He studied classical piano from a young age and started to perform professional roles, such as a member of the ensemble in Rigoletto, at the Cork Opera House, from the age of 15.

== Education ==
McCarthy studied at the London Academy of Music and Dramatic Art (LAMDA) where he received his diploma with honours, known as the A.L.A.M. diploma (Associate of the London Academy of Music and Dramatic Art).

He performed with the Montfort Singers in Cork and also studied then taught at the Montfort College of Performing Arts. He then received a full scholarship to Stephens College, Columbia, Missouri in the United States where he gained his Bachelor of Fine Arts degree in theatre and music. Parts that he performed at their summer stock theatre, the Okoboji Summer Theatre, and the college's Macklanburg Playhouse included: a soloist / ensemble member in a biographical revue of Cole Porter; Max in Cabaret; Tom in Brigadoon; Dominique in The Baker's Wife; Marco in A View from the Bridge; and Count Carl Magnus in A Little Night Music.

== Career ==
=== Stage ===
During the 1980s, through to 1990, McCarthy performed in a number of professional productions at Cork Opera House in his native Ireland. Roles included: a member of the ensemble in Rigoletto; Patrick Dennis in Mame; Tom Trainer in No, No, Nanette; Sir Lancelot in Camelot; and The Red Shadow in The Desert Song. When he was 18 (November 1984) he was cast as Theodore "Laurie" Laurence in Louisa May Alcott's Little Women at Cork's Everyman Palace Theatre.

He began his connection with Les Misérables in 1990, initially playing Combeferre and then the Factory Foreman and understudy to the part of Javert at the Palace Theatre in London. He took the role of Javert in his own right in the Palace Theatre in Manchester in 1992, replacing Philip Quast.

In November 1994 McCarthy appeared in a new musical, Out of the Blue, with Meredith Braun, who had previously starred alongside him as Éponine in Les Misérables in Manchester. However, bad reviews forced the show to close after just 17 performances at the Shaftesbury Theatre, London. The songs by composer, Shunichi Tokura, and lyricist, Paul Sand, were subsequently released by Stage Door Records in 2010.

He then went on to part of Javert which he played in thousands of performances, mostly in London, but also at: the Theatre Royal, Sydney, Australia; the Point Theatre, Dublin; Melbourne (cover for Roger Lemke); San Francisco; Shanghai, China; Seoul, South Korea and he finished the show's run at the Imperial Theatre, New York for Terrence Mann.

He revived his role as the Factory Foreman for the Les Misérables: The Dream Cast in Concert, the tenth anniversary concert of Les Misérables in 1995. He also played the role of Javert in concert productions: in 1997, at the Chelmsford Festival; in 2002 at the Globe Arena, Stockholm; and in 2004 for the Queen and her guests at Windsor Castle.

Other concert performances as Javert include Guernsey and Dublin, both in 2008.

As well as Les Misérables, McCarthy has appeared as Thomas Inkle in a 1997 revival of Inkle and Yarico for the Holder's season, Barbados. There were further performances in Washington, Edinburgh, and Berlin.

He also starred as the Phantom in Ken Hill's Phantom of the Opera (2000); as Ivan Molokov in Chess at the Oslo Spektrum, Norway (2006); and Sweeney Todd in Sweeney Todd: The Demon Barber of Fleet Street with The Göteborg Opera, in Sweden.

Further concert performances include: a centenary celebration of Ira Gershwin's birth, Who Could Ask for Anything More?; a concert performance of Inkle and Yarico at the Edinburgh Festival, which was transmitted live to the Royal Opera House in London; A Night of 100 Stars at the London Palladium; and Opera In The Park in the grounds of Temple Newsam, West Yorkshire, with the orchestra of Opera North, Lesley Garrett and Ruthie Henshall.

He has played the part of Sky Masterson in a concert performance of Guys and Dolls with the Key West Pops Orchestra, Key West in Florida, and covered for Bryn Terfel at Terfel's Faenol Festival in Gwynedd, North Wales. He has also joined Michael Ball in his concert show The Musicals on a Summer's Eve on a number of occasions.

=== Recording and broadcast ===
McCarthy has recorded three solo albums of covers: Broadway (1994); Living for the Moment (2000); and You're Still You (2012). He has also featured in recordings of musicals: Out of the Blue, as Dr. Akizuki (1994); It's Just The Beginning: The Songs of Charles Miller & Kevin Hammonds, singing Sail Me There from their musical Hope (2010); and a concept CD of a musical version of Dracula by Gareth Evans and Christopher J. Orton, which features McCarthy as Dracula and was accompanied by the release of a music video of one of the tracks, Within My World.

Some of his concert performances have been broadcast and released on DVD, such as: Who Could Ask for Anything More? on BBC Radio 2; Les Misérables: The Dream Cast in Concert; Inkle and Yarico, documentary filmed at the Holder's Festival, Barbados; and Lesley Garrett – Music from the Movies taken from the Opera In The Park concert, broadcast on BBC Two on Christmas Day 2004.

Other broadcast work includes: the role of The Gypsy King in The 10th Kingdom; the role of Second Priest in a TV film adaptation of Jesus Christ Superstar for PBS's series Great Performances, which was also released as a DVD; and he sang Summertime, Nature Boy and If Ever I Would Leave You on BBC Radio 2's Friday Night Is Music Night, presented by Ken Bruce.

=== Recent career ===
As well as continuing to perform McCarthy is the Executive Producer for the Harlequin Performing Arts Academy, at the Buccament Bay Resort, Kingstown in Saint Vincent and the Grenadines. He also runs the Performing Arts Summer School at Cork School of Music, is the guest musical director at Shorecrest Preparatory School, St. Petersburg, Florida, and has his own classes in St.Petersburg, Florida.

== Recognition ==
McCarthy was a nominee for the Green Room Award for Male Actor in a Leading Role 1998.

== Personal life ==
McCarthy has been married since October 1990. McCarthy's wife, Stephanie, is a music teacher and the couple have a son, Cían, who has won a scholarship to the American Musical and Dramatic Academy. In his spare time he is Director of Church Music at the First Baptist Church, St. Petersburg, Gandy, Florida.

== Interviews ==
- Denise Drysdale (interviewer), Michael McCarthy (guest) (July 1998). Denise (Television). Australia: Angela Pollard (website). Archived from the original on 14 April 2010.
- Wasik-Zegel, Gay (March 2019). "Artist Profile: Michael McCarthy's Magical Music" (PDF). . Northeast Journal. St Petersburg, Florida.
