= John Wooldridge =

English composer

- Born: 18 July 1919; Yokohama, Japan
- Died: 27 October 1958 (aged 39)
- Military career
- Allegiance: United Kingdom
- Branch: Royal Air Force
- Rank: Wing Commander
- Nickname: "Dim"
- Commands: No. 105 Squadron
- Conflicts: Second World War
- Awards: Distinguished Service Order; Distinguished Flying Cross & Bar; Distinguished Flying Medal

John De Lacy Wooldridge, DSO, DFC & Bar, DFM (18 July 1919 – 27 October 1958) was a Royal Air Force officer and bomber pilot, and a British film composer.

== Early life ==
Wooldridge was born in Yokohama, Japan, and was educated at St Paul's School, London. A talented music composer and academic, he studied music under Sibelius and was a friend and contemporary of William Walton.

== Second World War ==
Wooldridge joined the Royal Air Force as a sergeant pilot in 1938. During the Second World War, he was a member of RAF Bomber Command, flying a total of 97 operational bombing sorties. He was affectionately known as "Dim".

He served with the Handley Page Hampden-equipped 61 Squadron in 1939–1940, before transferring to No. 16 OTU, which was tasked with training Hampden crews. Wooldrige returned to 61 Squadron in August 1941, and in October that year moved to No. 207 Squadron based at RAF Bottesford flying Avro Manchesters. In May 1942 he transferred to No. 106 Squadron as one of Wing Commander Guy Gibson's flight commanders, serving with the squadron until October that year, when he was posted to Bomber Command Headquarters. Wooldridge was awarded the Distinguished Flying Cross for his service with 106 Squadron, this award being announced in December 1942. In March 1943, Wooldrige was appointed commanding officer of No. 105 Squadron, which specialised in low level precision daylight bombing using de Havilland Mosquito aircraft. He served as 105 Squadron's commander until 1 July 1943.

Wooldridge wrote a book, Low Attack, about these operations in 1944.

It would be impossible to forget ... the sensation of looking back over enemy territory and seeing your formation behind you, wing-tip to wing-tip, their racing shadows moving only a few feet below them across the earth's surface; or that feeling of sudden exhilaration when the target was definitely located and the whole pack were following you on to it with their bomb doors open, while people below scattered in every direction and the long streams of flak came swinging up; or the sudden jerk of consternation of the German soldiers lounging on the coast, their moment of indecision, and then their mad scramble for the guns; or the memory of racing across The Hague at midday on a bright spring morning, while the Dutchmen below hurled their hats in the air and beat each other on the back. All these are unforgettable memories. Many of them will be recalled also by the peoples of Europe long after peace has been declared, for to them the Mosquito came to be an ambassador during their darkest hours.

In May 1944, while in America, Wooldridge volunteered to ferry one of the first Canadian-built Mosquitoes across the Atlantic to Britain and, accompanied by Flying Officer C. J. Brown as navigator, set a new record for the Atlantic crossing from Goose Bay, Labrador to the United Kingdom, of 5 hours, 46 minutes. The previous record for the Labrador-Britain route had been held by a BOAC Liberator at 7 hours 56 minutes.

Wooldridge was aeronautical adviser to the Petroleum Warfare Department during the development of the Fog Investigation and Dispersal Operation (FIDO) fog dispersal system.

== Musical career ==
His first professionally performed work was the symphonic poem A Solemn Hymn for Victory, premiered by Artur Rodzinski and the New York Philharmonic Orchestra at Carnegie Hall on 30 Nov. 1944. Rodzinski reportedly had promised to give him one performance of his work for every five German planes he shot down. Later that year John Barbirolli conducted the Halle Orchestra in the UK premiere.

Wooldridge also contributed the score and co-wrote the screenplay to the 1953 film based on his own story, Appointment in London featuring Dirk Bogarde as a Wing commander.

== Personal life ==
Wooldridge's first marriage was in 1942 to Mary Latham, with whom he had a son, Morris Latham, who also became a pilot. The union ended in divorce. He subsequently married the actress Margaretta Scott in 1948, with whom he had a daughter, Susan Wooldridge, who also became an actress; and a son, Hugh Wooldridge.

Wooldridge was killed in a car accident in England aged 39.

== Film scores ==
- RX for Murder – (1958) – (US title: Prescription for Murder)
- Soapbox Derby – (1958)
- Count Five and Die – (1958)
- The Last Man to Hang? – (1956)
- Appointment in London – (1952)
- Crow Hollow – (1952) – (uncredited)
- Blackmailed – (1951)
- Torment – (1950) – (US title: Paper Gallows)
- The Woman in Question – (1950) – (US title: Five Angles on Murder)
- Conspirator – (1949)
- Edward, My Son – (1949)
- A Journey for Jeremy – (1949) (short)
- The Guinea Pig – (1948) – (US title: The Outsider)
- Fame is the Spur – (1947)
- Atomic Achievement - (1956)

== Musical works ==
- The Constellations (1944)
- A Solemn Hymn To Victory (1944)
- The Elizabethans
- Largo for Orchestra
- Prelude for an Unwritten Tragedy
- Prelude for a Great Occasion a.k.a. Music for a Great Occasion
- Song of the Summer Hills
- Slow March for the Royal Air Force
- The Saga of the Ships
