= Susan Wooldridge =

British actress (born 1950)

- Born: 31 July 1950 (age 76); Hammersmith, London, England
- Occupations: Actress, writer
- Years active: 1971–present
- Parents: Margaretta Scott; John Wooldridge
- Relatives: Hugh Wooldridge (brother)
- Awards: (1988)

Susan Wooldridge (born 31 July 1950) is a British actress. She won the BAFTA Award for Best Actress in a Supporting Role for Hope and Glory (1987). Her television credits include Jewel in the Crown, (1984), The Shout (1978), The Last Place on Earth (1985), Dead Man's Folly (1986), Loyalties (1986), How to Get Ahead in Advertising (1989), Bye Bye Blues (1989), Bergerac (1990), Twenty-One (1991), Afraid of the Dark (1991) Just like a Woman (1992), All Quiet on the Preston Front (1994–95), Twenty Thousand Streets Under the Sky (2005), Tamara Drewe (2010), The Lady (2011), and Still Star-Crossed (2017).

== Early life ==
Wooldridge was born in London, England, and educated at convent schools, the Central School of Speech and Drama, and the L'École Internationale de Théâtre Jacques Lecoq in Paris. She is the daughter of actress Margaretta Scott and composer John Wooldridge. She was eight years old when her father died in a car accident. Her brother is Hugh Wooldridge.

== Career ==
=== Acting ===
Wooldridge has been acting since 1971. Her big break came in 1984 with The Jewel in the Crown, in which she played the pivotal character of Daphne Manners whose affection for the handsome Hari Kumar doomed him. For this role she received a BAFTA nomination and the ALVA Award for Best Actress. Wooldridge won the BAFTA Award for Best Actress in a Supporting Role for her portrayal of Molly in the 1987 film Hope and Glory. She has appeared in many British and co-British film productions, including The Shout (1978), The Last Place on Earth (1985), miniseries in which she played the role of Kathleen Scott (wife of Robert Falcon Scott), Loyalties (1986), How to Get Ahead in Advertising (1989), Bye Bye Blues (1989), Twenty-One (1991), Afraid of the Dark (1991) and Just like a Woman (1992). Film appearances have included Tamara Drewe (2010) and The Lady (2011).

Wooldridge also appeared alongside Sir Peter Ustinov, Jean Stapleton, Tim Pigott-Smith, and Constance Cummings in Dame Agatha Christie's mystery, Dead Man's Folly (1986).

She has appeared in such British TV shows, Bergerac 1990, 'The Dig', and a two series of Preston Front (Best Comedy Award 1995), Twenty Thousand Streets Under the Sky (Best mini-series nomination), Underworld (Best Comedy Award 1998), Poirot: Cat Among the Pigeons, Bad Company (the case of The Bridgewater Four miscarriage of justice), Lady Killers, Pinochet’s Progress, Mrs. Bradley Mysteries, The Hummingbird Tree, A Very English Scandal, Lewis, Doctors, and Heartbeat.

In 2017, Wooldridge played The Nurse in the American television period drama series Still Star-Crossed.

=== Writing ===
In July 2009, her first novel, The Hidden Dance, was published in the United Kingdom by Allison & Busby, and won the Best Red Read for Best Debut Novel 2010.

== Personal life ==
She lives in London with her partner, the actor and writer, Andy de la Tour. In September 2025, the couple signed an open pledge with Film Workers for Palestine pledging not to work with Israeli film institutions "that are implicated in genocide and apartheid against the Palestinian people."
