= A Touch of Christmas =

Studio album by Shirley Jones
- Released: October 2010
- Recorded: 2010
- Genre: Pop; Christmas music
- Label: Encore Music Presents Records
- Producer: Les Brown Jr.

Shirley Jones chronology
Then & Now (2008)	A Touch of Christmas (2010)	A Tribute to Richard Rodgers (2011)

A Touch of Christmas is a studio album by American singer Shirley Jones of The Partridge Family music group. The album features 12 tracks of Christmas music songs performed by Jones. It was produced by Les Brown Jr. for Rayburt Productions. A Touch of Christmas features many holiday classics and includes the duet, "Baby, It's Cold Outside", sung with Tony Orlando. The album was released in 2010 on Encore Music Presents Records.

== Track listing ==
1. "It's the Most Wonderful Time of the Year"
2. "Silent Night, Holy Night"
3. "Let It Snow! Let It Snow! Let It Snow!"
4. "Have Yourself a Merry Little Christmas"
5. "Silver Bells"
6. "Baby, It's Cold Outside" (Duet with Tony Orlando)
7. "O Holy Night"
8. "The Christmas Song"
9. "Edelweiss"
10. "Winter Wonderland"
11. "A Touch of Christmas"
12. "White Christmas"
