= Meredith Braun =

- Born: 1973 (age 51–52); Remuera, Auckland, New Zealand
- Genres: Musical theatre
- Occupation(s): Actor, singer
- Years active: 1983–present
- Labels: Stage Door Records
- Website: meredithbraun.co.uk

Meredith Braun (born 1973) is a New Zealand actress and singer. She began her career as a child actress in her native New Zealand before relocating to the UK and starring in a number of West End musicals and touring productions.

== Early life ==
As a child in Remuera, Auckland, Braun appeared in numerous stage productions plus occasional television shows (The Haunting of Barney Palmer) and advertisements.

Her mother studied at the Royal College of Music in the 1950s and at the age of 16 Braun moved from New Zealand to London. In 1989, Braun earned a place at London's prestigious Italia Conti Academy of Theatre Arts.

== Career ==
She began her West End career six months later with a lead role in short-lived musical Bernadette at the Dominion Theatre. Cameron Mackintosh then cast her as Eponine in Les Miserables, a role she played in both London and Manchester. In 1993, she was cast as Betty Schaeffer in Andrew Lloyd Webber's musical version of Sunset Boulevard. Having been part of an audition process that involved 300 other potential actresses, Lloyd Webber said of Braun "When I saw Meredith and heard her I knew she was going to be a star".

Further shows in the West End included starring as Christine in The Phantom of the Opera plus Out of the Blue with Michael McCarthy and Killing Rasputin. Between 2000 and 2001, Braun starred as Lily in the RSC's production of The Secret Garden at both the Theatre Royal Stratford and the Aldwych Theatre, London.

Between 1995 and 1997, Braun returned home to her native Auckland, landing numerous roles in one of New Zealand's leading professional theatre companies, the Auckland Theatre Company. She came with the prestige as one of the starring names within New Zealand's theatre industry at the time.

Braun also appeared as Belle in Disney's 1992 holiday film The Muppet Christmas Carol opposite Michael Caine and the cast of The Muppets, and has done a number of television roles in the United Kingdom.

After a ten-year absence from performing, Braun released her debut solo album Someone Else's Story in 2012 - a mix of contemporary show songs and classical crossover material. The album features musical direction and arrangements by Paul Bateman (musical director for Sarah Brightman and Lesley Garrett), and was released on Stage Door Records on March 26, 2012.

In 2017, Braun released her second solo album When Love Is Gone featuring a new recording of the song of the same name she performed in The Muppet Christmas Carol marking the film's 25th anniversary. The album was released by Stage Door Records in November 2017.

Braun is currently the course director for The University of Chichester Conservatoire's BA (Hons) Musical Theatre (Music) Course, having previously been a lecturer for Musical Theatre Triple Threat course.

== Filmography ==
=== Film and television ===
Year	Title	Role	Notes
1987	The Haunting of Barney Palmer	Troy	
1992	The Muppet Christmas Carol	Belle	
2003	Doctors	Janine Lewis	
2007	New Tricks	Nyreen	
2009	Missing	Carrie Garrison	

=== UK theatre credits ===
Year	Title	Role	Theatre	Location
1990	Bernadette	Camille	Dominion Theatre	West End
1991	Les Misérables	Eponine	Palace Theatre	West End
1992-93	Les Misérables	Eponine	—	UK National Tour
1993	Sunset Boulevard	Betty Schaefer	Adelphi Theatre	West End
1994	Out of the Blue	Hideko	Shaftesbury Theatre	West End
1998-99	Killing Rasputin	Princess Irina	Bridewell Theatre	London
1999-20	The Phantom of the Opera	Christine	Her Majesty's Theatre	West End
2000-01	The Secret Garden	Lily	Aldwych Theatre / Theatre Royal Stratford East	West End / Stratford
2002	Cordelia	Jude	Royal National Theatre	London
2003	Forever Yours	Jennie	Southwark Playhouse	Off-West End

=== New Zealand theatre credits ===
Year	Title	Role	Theatre	Location
1985	The Tempest	Ariel		Auckland
1985	The Chalk Garden	Laurel		Auckland
1986	The Cage Birds	Gossip		Auckland
1986	The Secret Diary of Adrian Mole	Pandora		Auckland
1986	Snoopy	Peppermint Patty		Auckland
1987	Bugsy Malone	Blouse		Auckland
1987	The Wizard of Oz	Dorothy		Auckland
1987	Alice in Wonderland	Alice		Auckland
1987	Jack the Ripper	Polly		Auckland
1988	Fiddler on the Roof	Ensemble		Auckland
1995	Sweet Charity	Charity Hope Valentine	Mercury Theatre	Auckland
1995	Footrot Flats	Jess	Mercury Theatre	Auckland
1996	Jesus Christ Superstar	Mary Magdalene	Mercury Theatre	Auckland
1996	The Sound of Music	Maria	Mercury Theatre	Auckland
1997	South Pacific	Nellie Forbush	Mercury Theatre	Auckland

=== Workshops ===
Year	Title	Location
1994	Yusupov	Sydmonton Festival / Donmar Warehouse
1994	Jekyll	Prince of Wales Theatre
2004	The Far Pavilions	London

== Personal life ==
Braun has three children by her first husband, musical director David White, twins born 1997–1998, and a son, Tiger Braun-White, a cellist, born 2003–2004. Her second husband, Bill Rea, is a marine architect.
