= Montfort College of Performing Arts =

Montfort College of Performing Arts is a performing arts school in Cork City in the Republic of Ireland; it specialises in drama, dance, singing, musical theatre, choir and acrobatics.

== History ==
Montforts was established in 1958 by Eileen Nolan, who had previously founded a group called the "Montfort Singers" which performed at the "Cork Opera House". Its success inspired her to found the school. The Montfort College of Performing Arts' most recent productions were "Camp Rock" - Everyman Palace Theatre, "Cinderella" - Firkin Crane, Broadway Kidz - Half-Moon Theatre, "Joseph & the Amazing Technicolour Dreamcoat" - Everyman Palace Theatre, "Snow White & The Seven Dwarves" - Firkin Crane, "Broadway Kidz" (Second year) - Half Moon Theatre & "The Little Mermaid" - Everyman Palace Theatre.

== Notable alumni ==
=== Professional theatre ===
- Michael McCarthy – star of Les Misérables in the West End and on Broadway
- Elaine Symons – Elaine - working in the National Theatre and appeared in many TV shows and movies.
- Frank Twomey – presenter of Bosco for many years. Now presenting Cork City and Culture on TV

=== Musical directors ===
- Cathal Dunne
