= Who Could Ask for Anything More? A Celebration of Ira Gershwin =

- Genre: One-off TV special, recorded at the Royal Albert Hall, London, 24 November 1996
- Written by: Ira Gershwin
- Directed by: Gavin Taylor (television)
- Creative director: Hugh Wooldridge (theatre)
- Presented by: Charles Dance; David Soul
- Starring: Larry Adler; John Barrowman; Fiona Benjamin; Daniel Benzali; Leslie Caron; Victor Trent Cook; B.J. Crosby; Lorna Dallas; Tim Flavin; Debbie Gravitte; Ruthie Henshall; Greg Horsman (dancer); Lorna Luft; Maureen McGovern; Paul Nicholas^{a} Lisa Pavane (dancer); Stephanie Pope; Liz Robertson; Marti Webb; The Gershwin All-Stars: Tracie Bennett; Gerard Casey; Simon Green; Paul Gyngell; Linzi Hateley; Megan Kelly; Shona Lindsay; Michael McCarthy; Grania Renihan; Gareth Snook; The Broadway Dancers: Warren Carlyle / William Folan-Conray / Catherine Hoskins / Nicola Hughes / Lawrence Merry / Pili / Jon Petersen / Emma Tunmore; The Crazy For You Dancers: Julie Barnes / Elizabeth Cooper-Lee / Julia Ann Dixon / Lisa Donmall / Joantha Dunn / Amanda Lavin / Annette McLauglin / Marianne Richards / Claire Taylor / Jenny-Ann Topham; Members of Capital Voices directed by: Anne Skates; Other performers in the stage show but not televised: Peter Barkworth / Sarah Brightman / Maria Friedman / Derek Jacobi / Nigel Planer / Michael Praed / Helen Shapiro / Dave Willetts
- Composer: Various
- Country of origin: United Kingdom
- Original language: English
- No. of episodes: 1

Production
- Executive producers: Ian Martin (for HD Thames); Avril MacRory (for BBC); Colin Bell (for EuroArts Primetime); Richard Price (for EuroArts Primetime); David Rayvern Allen (for BBC Radio 2)
- Producer: Paul Kafno
- Production locations: Royal Albert Hall, London
- Editor: Nigel Cattle
- Camera setup: Multi-camera
- Running time: 95 mins
- Production companies: EuroArts Primetime; HD Thames; BBC; A&E Networks

Original release
- Network: BBC
- Release: 31 December 1996

Who Could Ask for Anything More? A Celebration of Ira Gershwin (24 November 1996) was a concert at the Royal Albert Hall, London, written and directed for the stage by Hugh Wooldridge in aid of Mencap to celebrate the centenary of Ira Gershwin's birth. It was initially broadcast on BBC Radio 2 (UK) on 7 December 1996, on television on BBC Two (UK) on 31 December 1996 and A&E Networks (US) on 9 August 1997.

== Background ==
The TV show was produced by Ian Martin and directed by Paul Kafno. Those performing included: Peter Barkworth; Tracie Bennett; Sarah Brightman; Tim Flavin; Maria Friedman; Greg Horsman; Derek Jacobi; Nigel Planer; Michael Praed; Helen Shapiro and Dave Willetts. It was hosted by Charles Dance and David Soul.

Present at the event were Ira Gershwin's family and the then Prime Minister John Major.

== Songs ==
Songs performed for the TV show included (in TV show order):

=== Part 1 ===
- "I Got Rhythm" – The Gershwin All Stars
- "The Saga of Jenny" – Ruthie Henshall
- "They Can't Take That Away from Me" – Paul Nicholas (Note: In the UK televised version of the show only.)
- "I Don't Think I'll Fall In Love Today" – Gerard Casey and Linzi Hateley
- "Love Is Here To Stay" – Debbie Gravitte
- "The Man I Love" - Megan Kelly and Paul Gyngell (with dancers Lisa Pavane and Greg Horsman)
- "Love Walked In" – Shona Lindsay and Gareth Snook

=== Part 2 ===
- "Shoes With Wings On" - The Gershwin All Stars
- "Shall We Dance?" – Fiona Benjamin and Tim Flavin
- "My Ship" – Linzi Hateley and Grania Renihan
- "Delishious" – Stephanie Pope
- "Embraceable You" – Marti Webb
- "The Man That Got Away" – Lorna Luft
- "Strike Up the Band" – John Barrowman and the company

=== Part 3 ===
- "Instrumental medley" – The London Gershwin Orchestra
- "But Not For Me" – Fiona Benjamin
- "I Can't Be Bothered Now" – Tim Flavin and The Crazy For You Dancers
- "I Can't Get Started" – Daniel Benzali and Liz Robertson
- "How Long Has This Been Going On?" – B.J. Crosby (Note: Moved to part 1 of the show for the US televised version just before "I Don't Think I'll Fall In Love Today".)
- "There Is No Music" - Lorna Dallas and Don Pippa

=== Part 4 ===
- "I've Got a Crush on You" - Michael McCarthy and Grania Renihan
- "Little Jazz Bird" – Maureen McGovern
- "It Ain't Necessarily So" – Victor Trent Cook
- "He Loves and She Loves" – Larry Adler and The Gershwin All-Stars, introduced by Leslie Caron
- "Heaven on Earth" – Michael McCarthy and Company
