= Silent Strength (album) =

Studio album by Shirley Jones
- Released: November 1989
- Recorded: 1989
- Genres: Pop; Christian pop
- Length: 44:50
- Label: Diadem
- Producers: George King; David T. Clydesdale

Shirley Jones chronology
Silent Strength (1989)	Shirley (1992)

Silent Strength is the debut solo studio album by American singer Shirley Jones of The Partridge Family music group. The album features 11 tracks of contemporary christian music songs. The track "You'll Never Walk Alone" is an updated cover version of the song Shirley Jones originally recorded for the film Carousel. Silent Strength was recorded in Nashville, Tennessee. It was produced by George King and arranged by David T. Clydesdale who also co-produced. Silent Strength was released in 1989 and issued on Diadem Records. It was available on compact disc and on cassette tape but not on vinyl.

== Track listing ==
No.	Title	Writer(s)	Length
1.	"Here I Am"	Mark Altrogge	2:59
2.	"Declare the Glory of Our King"	Tim Sheppard	3:11
3.	"Silent Strength"	Ray Boltz; Steve Millikan	5:29
4.	"I May Never Pass This Way Again"	Murray Wizell; Irving Melsher	2:59
5.	"All Around the World"	Kathy Frizzel; Claire Cloninger	3:56
6.	"We Come to Worship You"	J. J. Lee	5:45
7.	"A Simple Song of Praise"	George King; Bob Kauflin	2:27
8.	"God Will Provide the Lamb"	Ray Boltz; Steve Millikan	5:09
9.	"You'll Never Walk Alone"	Oscar Hammerstein II; Richard Rodgers	5:08
10.	"Just Gotta Tell You"	Gloria Gaither; William J. Gaither; Jeff Kennedy	3:38
11.	"Welcome Home Children"	Adrian King	4:00
Total length:			44:43
