= Inkle and Yarico =

English comic opera first staged in 1787

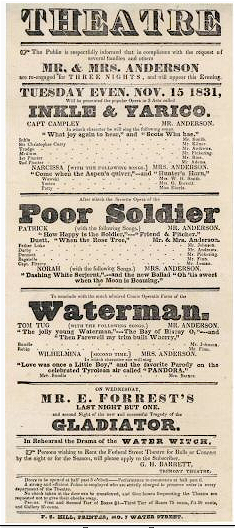
Boston, 1831: "The publie [sic] is respectfully informed that in compliance with the request of several families and others Mr. & Mrs. Anderson are re-engaged for three nights, and will appear this evening. Tuesday even. Nov. 15 1831, will be presented the popular opera in 3 acts called Inkle & Yarico."

Inkle and Yarico is a comic opera first staged in London, England, in August 1787, with music by Samuel Arnold and a libretto by George Colman the Younger.

== Plot ==
Inkle, an English trader, is shipwrecked in the West Indies, and survives with the help of Yarico, an Indian maiden. They fall in love, but when Inkle returns to his civilization, he plans to sell Yarico into slavery to recover his financial losses while he marries a woman, Narcissa, who will give him the social standing he wants. In the end, Narcissa marries another, and Inkle remains with Yarico.

== Origins ==
The supposedly true story first appeared in Richard Ligon's book A True and Exact History of the Island of Barbadoes (1657).

Richard Steele's The Spectator (the 1711–12 periodical by Addison and Steele, not the modern magazine The Spectator, founded in 1828, that is named after it) printed another version in March 1711, in which Yarico is a Native American, sold into slavery while bearing Inkle's child.

== 18th-century performances ==
The opera was highly successful, performed 98 times at the Haymarket Theatre, and a total of 164 performances on London stages by 1800. One of the most famous actresses to play the part of Yarico was Elizabeth Satchell, while Arabella Menage played Patty in an early production. There were also performances in Dublin (1787), Jamaica (1788), New York (1789), Philadelphia (1790), Calcutta (1791), Boston (1794), and Charleston (1794).

== Modern revival ==
In 1996, composer Roxanna Panufnik was commissioned by the Holders Opera Festival, Barbados, to recompose the opera for steelpan and modern symphony orchestra. The production premiered at the festival on 15 March 1997, featuring the Royal Philharmonic Orchestra with British soloist Rachel Hayward performing the solo pan part.

In 1997 Straydog Theatre, under the direction of Simon Godwin and the music direction of Peter Tregear, performed the work in the historic Cambridge Festival Theatre. Tregear reconstructed the score for the vocal and instrumental forces that Samuel Arnold had at his disposal at the Haymarket Theatre. The production was remounted for a season at the Battersea Arts Centre in 1998.

Composer James McConnel was commissioned to compose a score for Inkle'n Yarico in 1997, and this was performed at the 1999 Edinburgh Festival, starring Michael McCarthy (Inkle) and Natalie Tinn (Yarico).

In 2006, another reconstruction of Arnold's original opera was performed by Opera East at Magdalene College, Cambridge, conducted by Oliver Gooch and directed by Alistair Boag. The libretto was prepared by Richard Luckett and the score was orchestrated by Benjamin Chewter, again for the forces that Samuel Arnold had at his disposal at the Haymarket Theatre.

In 2015, John and Jodie Kidd produced a new musical based on the story at the London Theatre Workshop. General managed by Crow and Elk. It ran from 17 February to 28 March. Composed by James McConnel and lyrics by Carl Miller. Directed by Emily Grey, Musical Director Zara Nunn, Lighting Design Matt Haskins, Set, and costume design Sarah Beaton. A teaser video was released on YouTube.
