= Stage Door Records =

- Founded: 2007; 19 years ago
- Founder: Tim Hutton
- Distributor: Proper Note
- Genre: Musical theatre (cast albums); Solo albums by musical theatre performers; Restored vintage performances
- Country of origin: United Kingdom
- Location: London, United Kingdom
- Official website: http://www.stagedoorrecords.com/

Stage Door Records is a UK-based label founded in 2007 by Tim Hutton that specializes in cast recordings and vocalist albums from stars of stage and screen. The label has issued a number of cast albums on CD for the first time, including Mutiny! (original London cast with David Essex) and Colette (original London cast with Cleo Laine). Other cast albums include Napoleon, The Far Pavilions, Out of the Blue and Beautiful and Damned.

Stage Door has also released vocalist albums by Twiggy, Anthony Newley, Shirley Jones and Steve Barton.

Throughout 2011, Stage Door recorded West End leading lady Meredith Braun's debut solo album Someone Else's Story released in March 2012.

Stage Door is distributed in the United Kingdom through Proper Note.

== List of releases ==
- STAGE 9000: Shirley Bassey – The Early Years
- STAGE 9001: Wish You Were Here (Original Broadway Cast Recording)
- STAGE 9002: On Your Toes / Pal Joey (Studio Cast Recordings)
- STAGE 9003: New Faces of 1956 / Mrs. Patterson (Original Broadway Cast Recording)
- STAGE 9004: Ruggles of Red Gap (Original Television Cast)
- STAGE 9005: Gloria Swanson in Boulevard! (Concept Cast Recording)
- STAGE 9006: Selections From Cole Porter's Anything Goes
- STAGE 9007: Dee Shipman – She Isn't Me
- STAGE 9008: Shirley Jones – Then & Now
- STAGE 9009: Living For Pleasure (Original London Cast)
- STAGE 9010: Hermione Gingold – Live at the Cafe De Paris
- STAGE 9011: Lillian Roth – I'll Cry Tomorrow
- STAGE 9012: Julie Andrews – Musicality
- STAGE 9013: Gigi (Studio Cast Recordings)
- STAGE 9014: Charles Aznavour – Believe in Me
- STAGE 9015: Napoleon (Original Toronto Cast Recording)
- STAGE 9016: Spotlight On Larry Kert
- STAGE 9017: Steve Barton – Only for a While
- STAGE 9018: Twiggy – Gotta Sing, Gotta Dance
- STAGE 9019: The Far Pavilions (Concept Cast Recording)
- STAGE 9020: Once Upon A Time (Studio Cast Recording)
- STAGE 9021: Colette (Original London Cast Recording)
- STAGE 9022: Anthony Newley – Newley Discovered
- STAGE 9023: Steve Barton – Encore
- STAGE 9024: Beautiful And Damned (Concept Cast Recording)
- STAGE 9025: Out of the Blue (Original London Cast Recording)
- STAGE 9026: Mutiny! (Original London Cast Recording)
- STAGE 9027: J'Accuse...! – The Passions of Émile Zola (Original Concept Recording)
- STAGE 9028: The Sound of Music (Original Australian Cast Recording)
- STAGE 9029: Meredith Braun – Someone Else's Story
- STAGE 9030: Dave Willetts – Once in a Lifetime: The 25th Anniversary Collection
- STAGE 9031: Anthony Newley – The Last Song: The Final Recordings
- STAGE 9032: Chita Rivera – Chita! / And Now I Sing!
- STAGE 9033: Privates on Parade (Original London Cast Recording)
- STAGE 9034: Andy Capp (Original London Cast Recording)
- STAGE 9048: Drake's Dream (Original London Cast Recording)
- STAGE 9105: Doctor Doolittle & Half a Sixpence (London Studio Cast Recordings)
- STAGE 9106: Gloria Hunniford 'A Taste of Hunni'
- STAGE 9107: John Raitt 'Songs of the Open Road and Other Rarities'
- STAGE 9109: Instant Marriage (Original London Cast Recording)
- STAGE OD40: The Red Mill (Television Cast Recording)
- STAGE OD43: Bye Bye Birdie (London Studio Cast Recording)
- STAGE OD44: Tom Sawyer (Original Television Cast Recording)
- STAGE OD46: Quillow and the Giant (Original Television Cast Recording)
- STAGE OD47: Look Who's Here! (Original London Cast Recording)
- STAGE OD48: Snow White and the Seven Dwarfs on disc 1938-1960 (Studio Cast Recordings)
- STAGE OD49: On the Brighter Side (Original London Cast Recording)
- STAGE OD50: Mr. Broadway (Original Television Soundtrack)
- STAGE OD52: Once Upon a Mattress (Original Television Soundtrack)
- STAGE OD53: 13 Daughters (Original Honolulu Cast Recording)
- STAGE OD54: The Boyfriend (Original Broadway Cast Recording)
- STAGE OD55: Fanny (Original Broadway Cast Recording)
- STAGE OD56: Little Mary Sunshine (Original London Cast Recording)
- STAGE OD57: Damn Yankees (Original Broadway Cast Recording)
- STAGE OD58: Jacques Brel is Alive and Well and Living in Paris (Original London Cast Television Soundtrack)
- STAGE OD62: Salad Days (Original London Cast Recording)
- STAGE OD63: My Fair Lady (Original Broadway Cast Recording)
- STAGE OD65: April Love (Original Film Soundtrack)
- STAGE OD067: Plain and Fancy (Original Broadway Cast Recording)
- STAGE OD071: A Tree Grows in Brooklyn (Original Broadway Cast Recording)
