= White Boy (album) =

Unreleased studio album by Dan Hartman

- Vinyl test pressing of the album from MCA's Gloversville Plant, dated August 26, 1986.

Studio album by Dan Hartman
- Released: unreleased
- Recorded: 1985–1986
- Genre: Pop, pop rock
- Length: 41:45
- Label: MCA
- Producer: Dan Hartman

Dan Hartman chronology
I Can Dream About You (1984)	White Boy (unreleased)	New Green Clear Blue (1989)

Singles from White Boy
- 1. "Waiting to See You" Released: 1986

White Boy is the sixth studio album from American musician/singer/songwriter Dan Hartman. It was recorded during 1985 and 1986 but remains unreleased.

== Background ==
Following the commercial success of Hartman's hit single "I Can Dream About You", and the album of the same name, in 1984, Hartman soon began recording his second album for the MCA. Continuing his writing with songwriting partner Charlie Midnight, the new material was marked by Hartman's desire to create an edgier recording. However, when the new album was presented to MCA, they felt the songs did not suit Hartman's image and subsequently shelved the album. Despite this, a small number of vinyl test pressings were created by the company in 1986. In recent years, the songs from the album have circulated unofficially on the internet, courtesy of Hartman's close friend Glenn Ellison.

White Boy was not the first product of Hartman's to suffer rejection from MCA as the I Can Dream About You album also had songs that were never released. These songs, written by Hartman and Midnight, were rejected due to what MCA considered the edginess of the music and lyrics. After White Boy was shelved, Hartman returned to writing and producing for others until his death in 1994. His final studio album, New Green Clear Blue, an instrumental new age album, was released in 1989. Speaking to the Mohave Daily Miner in 1989, Hartman revealed: "It seemed to be a natural period when I wanted to stop doing pop records; it came with a falling-out between my record company and me. One of the quotes I heard was that they expected me to crank out 10 songs like "I Can Dream About You."

White Boy is known to have definitely featured ten particular tracks via Ellison's tape as well as MCA vinyl test pressings, all written by Hartman and Midnight, although other recordings were produced around the time and these may have been intended to end up on the album, including "The War is Over" and "Shadow Boxing". Only one song intended for the album, "Waiting to See You", was released officially on the original motion picture soundtrack for the 1986 film Ruthless People. It was released as a single in the UK, the Netherlands and Japan only, and peaked at No. 34 in the Netherlands. "Waiting to See You" and another song from the album, "I'm Only Foolin' Myself", were both performed in 1986 by Hartman on the UK TV show Rock Around the Dock.

A version of "First Impression" was released by Canadian singer Nancy Martinez on her third studio album Unpredictable (1989). English musician Paul Young recorded a version of "I'm Only Foolin' Myself" for his 1991 compilation From Time to Time – The Singles Collection. It was also issued as a CD single in the Netherlands by Columbia Records and a promotional 7" vinyl single in Spain. Young's version was produced by Hartman and mixed by Tom Lord-Alge, while Hartman also provided backing vocals.

In an interview with Midnight on memories of Hartman for his official fan site, one question asked about the making of the album and why it was never released. Midnight revealed:

"The White Boy album was a result of Dan's continuing desire to create an edgier recording that would signify an evolution in his career as an artist. There were points that he wanted to express both musically and lyrically that were considered, by the record company, to be outside the box for an artist like Dan. Although the nabobs at the label conceded that the songs were good, they did not feel that the material suited Dan and his "image." As a result, the album, with wonderful songs like "Age of Simulation" and "The War Is Over" was not released."

When asked if he had a favorite composition on the official fan site, Glenn Ellison stated: "Gosh – there are so many, some of which were on the "Whiteboy" project that has never been released. "Circle of Light" comes to mind as a brilliant and moving track. I have a tape of the whole project and it was some of their best work. Dan's music was always evolving and Charlie was right there with him."

== Track listing ==
All tracks are written by Dan Hartman and Charlie Midnight.

Side one
No.	Title	Length
1.	"Waiting to See You"	3:16
2.	"I'm Only Foolin' Myself"	4:19
3.	"The Mystery of Love"	5:09
4.	"The Age of Simulation"	5:41
5.	"Simulated Cake"	1:07

Side two
No.	Title	Length
6.	"In the Heat of the Night"	5:02
7.	"Circle of Light"	4:38
8.	"First Impression"	4:03
9.	"So Many Nights Alone Without You"	4:28
10.	"Ballerina (Let Me Take You Home)"	3:58
