= Teenage Mutant Ninja Turtles: The Original Motion Picture Soundtrack =

Soundtrack album by Various Artists
- Released: April 3, 1990
- Recorded: 1989–90
- Genres: Hip hop; techno; new jack swing
- Length: 44:08
- Label: SBK
- Producers: Felton Pilate; James Earley; M.C. Hammer; Hi Tek 3; Jo Bogaert; Monty Seward; Dan Hartman; Partners in Kryme; Johnny Kemp; Rhett Lawrence; Carl Sturken and Evan Rogers; Paul Peterson; John Du Prez; David Frank

Singles from Teenage Mutant Ninja Turtles: The Original Motion Picture Soundtrack
- 1. "Spin That Wheel" Released: February 26, 1990; 2. "Turtle Power" Released: April 13, 1990

Professional ratings
Review scores
Source	Rating
Allmusic	3/5 stars

Teenage Mutant Ninja Turtles: The Original Motion Picture Soundtrack is the soundtrack to the 1990 New Line Cinema film Teenage Mutant Ninja Turtles. It was released by SBK Records on April 3, 1990. The collection is made up mostly of hip-hop and new jack swing styled tracks with several film score cues at the end.

== Track listing ==
Side A
No.	Title	Writer(s)	Artist	Length
1.	"This Is What We Do"	M.C. Hammer	M.C. Hammer	4:56
2.	"Spin That Wheel"	El Sati; Kovali; Ya Kid K	Hi Tek 3	3:51
3.	"Family"	Monty Seward	Riff	4:50
4.	"9.95"	Charlie Midnight; Dan Hartman	Spunkadelic	4:00
5.	"Turtle Power"	James P. Alpern; Richard A. Usher Jr.	Partners in Kryme	4:21

Side B
No.	Title	Writer(s)	Artist	Length
1.	"Let the Walls Come Down"	Johnny Kemp; Rhett Lawrence	Johnny Kemp	4:06
2.	"Every Heart Needs a Home"	Carl Sturken and Evan Rogers; Paul Peterson	St. Paul	5:06
3.	"Shredder's Suite"	John Du Prez	John Du Prez	4:25
4.	"Splinter's Tale I & Splinter's Tale II"	Du Prez	John Du Prez (feat. Kevin Clash)	5:28
5.	"Turtle Rhapsody"	David Frank; Du Prez	Orchestra on the Half Shell	3:44

== Charts ==
Chart (1990)	Peak position
Australian Albums (ARIA)	7
Canada Top Albums/CDs (RPM)	10
New Zealand Albums (RMNZ)	22
US Billboard 200	13

== Certifications ==
Region	Certification	Certified units/sales
Australia (ARIA)	Gold	35,000^{^}
Canada (Music Canada)	Platinum	100,000^{^}
United Kingdom (BPI)	Gold	100,000^{^}
United States (RIAA)	Platinum	1,000,000^{^}
United States (RIAA) Video	Gold	50,000^{^}
^{^} Shipments figures based on certification alone.
