= Waiting to See You =

Single by Dan Hartman

from the album Ruthless People (soundtrack) and White Boy
- Released: 1986
- Genre: Pop
- Length: 4:09 (single version)
- Label: Epic
- Songwriters: Dan Hartman; Charlie Midnight
- Producer: Dan Hartman

Dan Hartman singles chronology
"Get Outta Town" (1985)	"Waiting to See You" (1986)	"The Love You Take" (1988)

"Waiting to See You" is a song by American singer-songwriter and musician Dan Hartman, which was released in 1986 as a single from the film soundtrack of Ruthless People. It was written by Hartman and Charlie Midnight, and was produced by Hartman. The song was also to be included on Hartman's album White Boy, which was shelved by MCA in 1986.

== Music video ==
The song's music video was directed by Ken Ross and Richard Levine for Ross & Levine Inc. and N. Lee Lacy and associates. The video features Hartman recording the song in the studio with his backing band, with interspersed shots from Ruthless People. The video achieved active rotation on MTV.

== Critical reception ==
In a review of "Waiting to See You" as a single, Billboard noted, "Hartman's contribution to the Ruthless People collection rocks out to a marching band rhythm, complete with foursquare, thumping bass drum." Bill Novak of The Sheboygan Press gave the single a three out of four star rating and commented, "Good beat, fair singing, and it will probably make it, since it's from a big summer film." In the UK, Neil Spencer of Sounds was negative in his review, calling it "silky smooth mid-'80s pop tripe".

In a review of the soundtrack, Mike Abrams of The Ottawa Citizen described "Waiting to See You" as "powerful" and one of the tracks that "add some snap to this somewhat uninteresting soundtrack". Dick Hogan of The Gazette considered the song "the sleeper tune of the album". He added, "It's very good. The song has a good dance beat, ear-catching synthesizer and thumping drum. Hartman's vocal is very appealing." Brian Chin of Billboard felt the song "may be another club late-nighter" like Hartman's "I Can Dream About You".

== Track listing ==
7" single

1. "Waiting to See You" - 4:09
2. "Waiting to See You (Film To Dance Mix)" - 3:42

7" single (American promo)

1. "Waiting to See You" - 4:09
2. "Waiting to See You" - 4:09

12" single (UK release)

1. "Waiting to See You" - 4:09
2. "Waiting to See You (Film To Dance Mix)" - 3:42
3. "Instant Replay (Album Version)" - 5:18
4. "This Is It (Remix)" - 6:43

CD single (Dutch release)

1. "Waiting to See You" - 4:09
2. "Relight My Fire"

== Personnel ==
- Dan Hartman - vocals, producer
- Chris Lord-Alge - mixing on "Waiting to See You"
- Robert Funk - narration on "Waiting to See You (Film to Dance Mix)"
- Tom Moulton - remixer on "Instant Replay (Album Version)" and "This Is It (Remix)"
- Betty Marshall - cover photography

== Charts ==
Chart (1986)	Peak position
Netherlands (Dutch Top 40)	33
Netherlands (Single Top 100)	34
