= Unchain My Heart =

Unchain My Heart may refer to:

- "Unchain My Heart" (song), a 1961 song by Bobby Sharp
- Unchain My Heart (album), a 1987 album by Joe Cocker
