= Streets of Fire (soundtrack) =

Streets of Fire: Music from the Original Motion Picture Soundtrack

Soundtrack album by Various artists
- Released: May 29, 1984
- Recorded: 1983
- Genres: Pop rock; hard rock; Wagnerian rock; rockabilly
- Length: 41:25
- Label: MCA
- Producers: Jim Steinman; Jimmy Iovine; Rupert Hine; Kenny Vance; Phil Alvin; Pat Burnette; Tom Petty; Dan Hartman; Ry Cooder

Alternative cover
- European release cover

Singles from Streets of Fire: Music from the Original Motion Picture Soundtrack
- 1. "I Can Dream About You" Released: April 1984; 2. "Nowhere Fast" Released: 1984; 3. "Sorcerer" Released: 1984; 4. "Never Be You" Released: September 1985

Professional ratings
Review scores
Source	Rating
AllMusic	3/5 stars

Streets of Fire: Music from the Original Motion Picture Soundtrack is the soundtrack album to the 1984 film of the same name, released by MCA Records on May 29, 1984. It features the hit single "I Can Dream About You" by Dan Hartman.

The album peaked at No. 32 on the Billboard 200.

== Background ==
Jimmy Iovine produced five of the songs for the film and the soundtrack album. For the singing voice of Ellen Aim (Diane Lane), he combined the voices of Laurie Sargent and Holly Sherwood, billing them as Fire Inc. They provided the lead vocals on Ellen's songs "Nowhere Fast", "Never Be You", and "Sorcerer", and supporting vocals on "Tonight Is What It Means to Be Young". The fictional rock band The Attackers were Face to Face, the real-life bandmates of Sargent. The version of "Sorcerer" featured on the soundtrack, composed by Stevie Nicks, was recorded by Marilyn Martin. "Never Be You" was recorded by Maria McKee for the soundtrack; a version of the song was recorded by Rosanne Cash for the film, but was not used.

Fire Inc. was an improvised Wagnerian rock studio project created by Jim Steinman specifically for the film, featuring uncredited singers Sargent and Sherwood as female lead vocalists, along with Rory Dodd and Eric Troyer as male backing vocalists, who appeared frequently on several Steinman product during the 1980s. "Tonight Is What It Means to Be Young" peaked at No. 80 on the Billboard Hot 100 and its title was used as the tagline on some promotional materials for the film.

Dan Hartman's song "I Can Dream About You" is the most successful single from the soundtrack, and became a Billboard top-10 hit in 1984 (also from his studio album of the same name). In the film, the song is performed on stage at the end of the film by The Sorels, a fictional doo-wop-style group consisting of actors Stoney Jackson, Grand L. Bush, Mykelti Williamson, and Robert Townsend. However, it was sung for the film by Winston Ford, whose vocals were lip-synced by Jackson. While there are thus two versions of the song, only Hartman's version was released commercially.

Steinman later recalled thinking the script was "terrible", but he thought the film was going to be a big hit, in part because of the enthusiasm of Joel Silver:

[He said] this movie is about visuals. It's about excitement, it's about thrills. Don't worry about the script... Then we go to the first edit, the first cut of the movie in the screening room and it's [Jimmy] Iovine and me and Joel Silver... And about 20 minutes into the movie Jimmy turns to me and he goes... this movie is really shitty isn't it? It's really bad. I said, yeah, it's a really bad script... Joel's on the other side going, what am I gonna do next? There's gotta be a next project, and they're sitting there and there's so many lessons I learned during that movie. It went $14 million over budget, I think and I kept saying to Joel, how are they allowing this? 'Cause they kept screaming at us, it's over the budget. I said, how, and they, you've gotta understand, they built all, Walter Hill didn't want to go to Chicago. The story took place in Chicago, so they built Chicago in LA.

Steinman has said the filmmakers were convinced they would have the rights to the Bruce Springsteen song "Streets of Fire", and filmed an ending using it. However, when they were unable to obtain the rights to the song, Steinman wrote "Tonight Is What It Means to Be Young" in two days as the film's ending theme.

So I wrote this song that I loved and I sent it to them and he and Joel, I remember, left me a great message saying, I hate you, you bastard, I love this song. We're gonna have to do it. We're gonna have to re-build the Wiltern Theater, which they had taken down, it was a million dollars to re-do the ending... and I felt all his hostility for Universal. A guy named Sean Daniels, who was head of production, one day said to me, well there is hostility because we understand you waited about eight months to come up with that final song and you never did it. I said, where'd you hear that? I did it in two days. He said, Jimmy Iovine. So I went to Jimmy Iovine and I said all that to his, yeah it's true, I know. I blamed you but you can't be upset with me. I'm not like a writer. I've gotta make my way with these people. I had to have a scapegoat.

The Blasters, who turned down the chance to appear in Hill's 48 Hrs., appear in the film performing two songs.

Hill had previously worked with Ry Cooder several times, but Cooder did not do the original score. Hill was unhappy with that score and liked music Cooder had written for Stroker Ace which the director of that film had not wanted to use.

"Tonight Is What It Means to Be Young" was later covered in 1986 in Japanese by Megumi Shiina as "Kon'ya wa Angel" (今夜はANGEL; lit. "There's an Angel Tonight"), a version which was used as the opening theme for the drama series Janus no Kagami (ヤヌスの鏡; lit. Janus' Mirror) and was also released as a single. This version peaked at No. 7 on Oricon's Weekly Singles chart.

== Track listing ==
Side A
No.	Title	Writer(s)	Artist	Length
1.	"Nowhere Fast"	Jim Steinman	Fire Inc.	6:02
2.	"Sorcerer"	Stevie Nicks	Marilyn Martin	5:06
3.	"Deeper and Deeper"	Cy Curnin; Adam Woods; Rupert Greenall; Jamie West-Oram; Dan K. Brown	The Fixx	3:45
4.	"Countdown to Love"	Kenny Vance; Marty Kupersmith	Greg Phillinganes	3:00
5.	"One Bad Stud"	Jerry Leiber and Mike Stoller	The Blasters	2:28

Side B
No.	Title	Writer(s)	Artist	Length
6.	"Tonight Is What It Means to Be Young"	Steinman	Fire Inc.	6:58
7.	"Never Be You"	Tom Petty; Benmont Tench	Maria McKee	4:06
8.	"I Can Dream About You"	Dan Hartman	Dan Hartman	4:07
9.	"Hold That Snake"	Ry Cooder; Jim Dickinson	Ry Cooder	2:36
10.	"Blue Shadows"	Dave Alvin	The Blasters	3:17
Total length:				41:25

Songs not included in the soundtrack, but featured in the film include the following:

- The Ry Cooder Band – "Get Out of Denver", "You Got What You Wanted", "First Love First Tears", and "Rumble"
- Laurie Sargent – "Never Be You" and "Sorcerer"
- Winston Ford – "Countdown to Love" and "I Can Dream About You"

== Charts ==
Chart (1984)	Peak position
Australia (Kent Music Report)	60
Austrian Albums (Ö3 Austria)	20
Canada Top Albums/CDs (RPM)	56
German Albums (Offizielle Top 100)	10
Swedish Albums (Sverigetopplistan)	3
Swiss Albums (Schweizer Hitparade)	8
U.S. Billboard 200	32
