= Joe Cocker Classics Volume 4 =

Joe Cocker – Classics, Volume 4

Greatest hits album by Joe Cocker
- Released: February 1987
- Genre: Rock/Pop
- Length: 51:18
- Label: A&M

Joe Cocker chronology
Cocker (1986)	Joe Cocker – Classics, Volume 4 (1987)	Unchain My Heart (1987)

Professional ratings
Review scores
Source	Rating
Allmusic	4.5/5 stars

Joe Cocker – Classics, Volume 4 is a greatest hits compilation for English singer Joe Cocker, released in 1987 by A&M Records as part of A&M's classics series of greatest hits albums for artists on its label. This compilation is label-exclusive; therefore, it only contains Joe Cocker's hits on the A&M label.

== Track listing ==
1. "Feeling Alright" (1969) – 4:11
2. "You Are So Beautiful" (1974) – 2:42
3. "High Time We Went" (1972) – 4:29
4. "She Came In Through the Bathroom Window" (1969) – 2:38
5. "The Letter" (1970) – 4:21
6. "Midnight Rider" (1972) – 4:01
7. "With a Little Help from My Friends" (1968) – 5:04
8. "Woman to Woman" (1972) – 4:27
9. "Cry Me a River" (1970) – 3:54
10. "I Think It's Going to Rain Today" (1975) – 3:58
11. "Delta Lady" (1969) – 2:50
12. "Darling Be Home Soon" (1969) – 4:42
13. "The Jealous Kind" (1976) – 3:49
