= Partners in Kryme =

American hip hop group

- Origin: New York City
- Genres: Hip hop
- Years active: 1990–1991, 2015
- Labels: SBK; Capitol
- Past members: James Alpern; Richard Usher

Partners in Kryme (or Partnerz in Kryme) was an American hip hop duo from New York City. Its members were James Alpern and Richard Usher, using the stage names of DJ Keymaster Snow and MC Golden Voice, respectively. They are most famously known for their debut single, "Turtle Power!", which was written for and featured in the movie Teenage Mutant Ninja Turtles in 1990, and became an international hit, reaching number 13 in the US and number one for four weeks in the UK. The song was infamous for erroneously calling Raphael the "leader of the group." Usher in an interview stated the group had no previous knowledge of Teenage Mutant Ninja Turtles and based the lyrics for the song from a synopsis given by the producers, and with Raphael as the main character in the first film, they expected he was the leader. By the time they learned he wasn't, the song was already finished and filming nearly complete.

A second single, "Undercover", was released on Capitol Records, but the group never released a full-length album. Another song, "Love 2 Love U" was recorded in 1991 for the soundtrack of Cool as Ice movie.

According to the UK magazine Smash Hits, the word Kryme is in fact an acronym for K.eep R.hythm Y.our M.otivating E.lement;

On May 30, 2015, Partners In Kryme released a new single centered on the Teenage Mutant Ninja Turtles on their official YouTube channel, entitled "Rock The Halfshell."

== Discography ==
=== Singles ===
Title	Year	Peak positions										Album
Title	Year	US	US R&B	AUS	GER	IRE	NED	NZ	SWE	SWI	UK	Album
"Turtle Power!"	1990	13	23	15	12	4	40	7	19	14	1	Teenage Mutant Ninja Turtles: The Original Motion Picture Soundtrack
"Undercover"	1990	—	—	—	—	—	—	—	—	—	92	Non-album singles
"Love 2 Love U"	1991	—	—	—	—	—	—	—	—	—	—	Cool as Ice (soundtrack)
"Rock the Halfshell"	2015	—	—	—	—	—	—	—	—	—	—	Non-album singles
