= One Night of Sin =

Studio album by Joe Cocker
- Released: 30 June 1989
- Recorded: 1988–1989
- Studio: Atlantic Studios and Sigma Sound Studios (New York City, New York); House of Music Studios (West Orange, New Jersey)
- Genre: Rock, pop
- Length: 49:25
- Label: Capitol
- Producer: Charlie Midnight

Joe Cocker chronology
Unchain My Heart (1987)	One Night of Sin (1989)	Joe Cocker Live (1990)

Singles from One Night of Sin
- 1. "When the Night Comes" Released: 1989; 2. "Fever / I'm Your Man" Released: 1989; 3. "I Will Live for You" Released: 1989

Professional ratings
Review scores
Source	Rating
AllMusic	2/5 stars

One Night of Sin is the twelfth studio album by English singer Joe Cocker, released by Capitol Records in June 1989.

It contains the hit single "When the Night Comes" (US No. 11), which was Cocker's last US Top 40 hit and played at the end credits of Tom Selleck's crime drama An Innocent Man of that same year. The song is also notable because it was written by Bryan Adams, who also played guitar, and Jim Vallance. Other notable songs on the album include a cover of "One Night" (here as "One Night of Sin"), a No. 1 hit by Elvis Presley from 1958, and "I'm Your Man" by Leonard Cohen. The album also features "Another Mind Gone", which was the first album track in 13 years co-written by Cocker— in the interim, he had also received songwriting credits for the songs "We Stand Alone" (from the 1986 soundtrack to the film Wildcats) and "Now That You're Gone" (from the soundtrack to the 1987 German film The Crack Connection). "Another Mind Gone" was dedicated to B. J. Wilson, Cocker's former bandmate and a friend.

== Track listing ==
1. "When the Night Comes" (Bryan Adams, Jim Vallance, Diane Warren) – 5:20
2. "I Will Live for You" (Stephen Allen Davis) – 4:11
3. "Got to Use My Imagination" (Gerry Goffin, Barry Goldberg) – 4:24
4. "Letting Go" (Charlie Midnight, Jimmy Scott) – 4:11
5. "Just to Keep from Drowning" (Marshall Chapman, Davis) – 4:39
6. "Unforgiven" (Tim Hardin, Ken Lauber) – 3:28 – CD bonus track
7. "Another Mind Gone" (Joe Cocker, Jeff Levine, Chris Stainton) – 4:44
8. "Fever" (Eddie Cooley, John Davenport) – 3:37
9. "You Know It's Gonna Hurt" (Rick Boston, Nick Gilder) – 3:59
10. "Bad Bad Sign" (Dan Hartman, Midnight) – 4:09
11. "I'm Your Man" (Leonard Cohen) – 3:52
12. "One Night of Sin" (Dave Bartholomew, Pearl King) – 3:14

== Personnel ==
- Joe Cocker – vocals
- Jeff Levine – acoustic piano (1, 4–6, 8, 12), synthesizers (2, 3, 7, 9, 11), percussion (9), organ (10, 12)
- Chris Stainton – organ (1, 2, 5, 8), acoustic piano (3, 10, 11), synthesizers (4, 7, 9), arrangements (12)
- Phil Grande – lead guitar (1–3, 7–10, 12), guitar solo (1–5, 7–12)
- Bryan Adams – rhythm guitar (1)
- Jeff Pevar – guitars (2–5, 8, 9, 11), lead guitar (4), slide guitar (10)
- T. M. Stevens – bass
- David Beal – drums, percussion (1, 4, 7–12)
- Bashiri Johnson – percussion (2, 3, 5, 8, 10)
- Mario Cruz – saxophones (3, 5, 10)
- Frank Elmo – saxophones (3, 5, 10)
- Lenny Pickett – sax solo (3, 5)
- Deric Dyer – sax solo (6, 11)
- Crispin Cioe – saxophones (8, 10–12)
- Arno Hecht – saxophones (8, 10–12)
- Richie La Bamba – trombone (3, 5, 10)
- Bob Funk – trombone (8, 10–12), horn arrangements (8, 10–12)
- Mark Pender – trumpet (3, 5, 10), horn arrangements (3, 5, 10)
- "Hollywood" Paul Litteral – trumpet (8, 10–12)
- Tawatha Agee – backing vocals
- Curtis King – backing vocals
- Vaneese Thomas – backing vocals

== Production ==
- Dan Hartman – executive producer
- Michael Lang – executive producer
- Charlie Midnight – producer
- John Rollo – associate producer, engineer, mixing
- Ellen Fitton – assistant engineer
- Danny Grigsby – assistant engineer
- Mike Weisinger – assistant engineer
- Lolly Grodner – assistant mix engineer
- Vicki Nemarich – assistant mix engineer
- Bob Ludwig – mastering at Masterdisk (New York, NY)
- Tommy Steele – art direction
- Norman Moore – design
- Timothy White – photography
- Better Music, Inc. – management

== Charts ==
=== Weekly charts ===
Chart (1989)	Peak position
Australian Albums (ARIA)	32
Austrian Albums (Ö3 Austria)	1
Canadian Albums (RPM)	60
Dutch Albums (Album Top 100)	15
Finnish Albums (Suomen virallinen lista)	28
German Albums (Offizielle Top 100)	2
New Zealand Albums (RMNZ)	20
Norwegian Albums (VG-lista)	4
Swedish Albums (Sverigetopplistan)	21
Swiss Albums (Schweizer Hitparade)	1
US Billboard 200	52

=== Year-end charts ===
Chart (1989)	Position
Austrian Albums (Ö3 Austria)	8
Dutch Albums (Album Top 100)	75
German Albums (Offizielle Top 100)	19
Swiss Albums (Schweizer Hitparade)	7

Chart (1990)	Position
Austrian Albums (Ö3 Austria)	26

== Certifications ==
Region	Certification	Certified units/sales
Austria (IFPI Austria)	Platinum	50,000^{*}
Canada (Music Canada)	Gold	50,000^{^}
Germany (BVMI)	Gold	250,000^{^}
Switzerland (IFPI Switzerland)	Platinum	50,000^{^}
^{*} Sales figures based on certification alone.^{^} Shipments figures based on certification alone.
