= New Green Clear Blue =

Studio album by Dan Hartman
- Released: 4 April 1989
- Recorded: August 1987 - August 1988
- Genres: Ambient, minimal, new age, chillout, space music
- Length: 56:04
- Label: Private Music
- Producer: Dan Hartman

Dan Hartman chronology
White Boy (1986)	New Green Clear Blue (1989)	Keep the Fire Burnin' (1994)

New Green Clear Blue is the seventh and final studio album by American musician and songwriter Dan Hartman, released by Private Music in 1989. The album represented a big stylistic departure for Hartman; it consists of instrumental, ambient songs, with the concept of being a journey into the subconscious. New Green Clear Blue was written, performed, engineered and produced entirely by Hartman.

In the album's sleeve notes, Hartman was quoted as saying: "The subconscious mind is a powerful world possessing experiences and feelings we do not necessarily recognize in our daily movements; but nonetheless they influence our entire lives. The tones and shades in this collection were performed live and intuitively for the purpose of opening channels by which the listener may visit their own subconscious". He also stated "This music is meant to be something that helps people connect with their subconscious. It is intended to be played at very low levels in a tranquil environment. It's a platform for the imagination."

== Background ==
New Green Clear Blue marked a stylistic departure for Hartman's solo career. After the commercial success of his 1984 album I Can Dream About You, Hartman returned to the studio to record the follow-up, White Boy, however his label, MCA, disagreed with the musical direction of the material and ultimately refused to release it. Speaking to the Mohave Daily Miner in 1989, Hartman said: "It seemed to be a natural period when I wanted to stop doing pop records; it came with a falling-out between my record company and me. One of the quotes I heard was that they expected me to crank out 10 songs like "I Can Dream About You"."

With his departure from MCA, Hartman was inspired to record an instrumental, ambient album after listening to the music of Brian Eno and Vangelis. Once he decided to begin the New Green Clear Blue project, Hartman began reading material on the subconscious mind and intuitiveness, as well as how songs work to create an emotional reaction with their listener. He spent eighth months researching and reading, and then began writing and recording material in his home studio in Connecticut between August 1987 and August 1988.

Hartman revealed to Mohave Daily Miner:

"The basis of this album was to use tones and shades in certain patterns so the door to a listener's subconscious would be opened. My music has more of a neoclassical leaning than new age. There's nothing placed in the music to tell you things. It's merely my trying to tap the subconscious feelings of people who listen to it. It may bring up bad memories. In a lot of ways it's very melancholy to me. It's not an upper. Life isn't either. In a lot of ways this music is very soothing. I think there's a place for music that is peaceful and soulful unto the spirit. After plane bombings, AIDS and everything that has come upon us in this decade, I think we can use a little solace and reflection.

Hartman attempted to unlock his own subconscious during the writing and recording of the album: "I became frightened, to the point I was going to stop doing it. I was unlocking my own subconscious. And the first two or three pieces I listened to I felt were planets away from fulfilling my concept. Little by little, it began to flow. By that time I think I was on automatic pilot. I knew I had shifted gears to another level of the creative process. I ended up making 23 pieces for the collection. I narrowed it down to 11."

Hartman dedicated the album to his sister, Kathy, because of the colour of her eyes and how he felt she was still seeking her inner self. In an interview for the Dan Hartman fan site, Edgar Winter, a former musical collaborator of Hartman's, said that the album "marked a new evolutionary step in Dan's writing". He commented: "It is pure music of the spirit with no commercial intentions - meditative, peaceful, and serene. I know it came straight from his heart and was a beautiful parting gift to us all."

== Critical reception ==
Professional ratings
Review scores
Source	Rating
AllMusic	3/5 stars
Q	4/5 stars
The Virgin Encyclopedia of 70s Music	2/4 stars

Johnny Black of Q considered the album to be "beautiful" and reminiscent of Brian Eno and Harold Budd. He wrote: "Hartman builds layer upon layer of gauzy synthesizer wash, cavernous echoes intermingled with distant thunder and enlivened by simple Satie-like piano tinklings. Finally, he introduces aural events which occur only once or twice in a piece, but which serve as lenses enabling the mind's eye to focus more sharply on his mist-hung musical landscapes."

== Track listing ==
All tracks are written by Dan Hartman.

No.	Title	Length
1.	"Sigh of Relief"	4:35
2.	"Romance"	5:13
3.	"New Green/Clear Blue"	5:06
4.	"The Swan"	4:56
5.	"Beautiful Mist"	5:27
6.	"Alpha Waves"	5:44
7.	"Adrift in a Red Sky"	6:26
8.	"Scaramanga"	4:08
9.	"Soviet Nights"	4:27
10.	"Hope of No End"	4:39
11.	"Home"	5:23

== Personnel ==
- Dan Hartman - producer, instruments, engineer
- Rod Hui - mixing (tracks 1, 11)
- Peter Baumann - mixing (track 8), noises (ambient treatment) (track 4)
- Amanda Stone, Andrew Derrick - design
- Danny Goldberg - management
