= Charlie Midnight =

American songwriter and record producer

- Born: Brooklyn, New York, United States
- Genres: Pop, pop rock, rock
- Occupations: Songwriter, record producer

Charlie Midnight (born Charles Kaufman, January 9, 1954) is an American songwriter and record producer and the founder of Midnight Production House. He has been nominated for the 1987 Grammy Award for Best R&B Song (Writer, "Living in America" by James Brown), two Golden Globes, and has been a producer and/or writer on several Grammy-winning albums, including The Bodyguard: Original Soundtrack Album, Joni Mitchell's Turbulent Indigo, and Marlo Thomas & Friends: Thanks & Giving All Year Long. He also is a writer on the Barbra Streisand Grammy-nominated, Platinum-selling Partners album having co-written the Barbra Streisand and Andrea Bocelli duet "I Still Can See Your Face".

== Early life ==
Midnight was born in Brooklyn, New York to Louis Leo Kaufman (1916–1993), a factory worker and World War II veteran, and Bella Hanft (1918–2012). He was raised in Bensonhurst, a working-class neighborhood, and attended Lafayette High School. He aspired to enter acting, according to his high school yearbook, or pursue poetry. Before deciding to become a musician, Midnight briefly attended Brooklyn College. His first musical foray was in London, England with a band before he returned a few months later to the United States. Midnight worked various jobs to support his music career, such as being employed as a legal proofreader and paralegal.

== Career ==
=== Initial solo career ===
Although primarily known as a producer and songwriter for other artists, Midnight actually began his career as a singer and musician himself. He performed in several groups throughout the late 1970s and early 1980s, which culminated in the release of his solo album Innocent Bystander in 1982. Shortly after his first and last solo album (which he deemed a commercial failure based on its reception), Midnight came to the attention of famed singer-songwriter, musician and producer Dan Hartman. The two began collaborating on songwriting, forming a musical partnership that would last until Hartman's death in 1994.

=== Songwriting and producing ===
Midnight's first producing job was the Time Bandits' 1987 album Can't Wait for Another World with Hartman as the executive producer. He went on to produce and write songs for more than 40 films including Rocky IV, The Bodyguard, Bull Durham, Lizzie McGuire and Ruthless People, as well as for such varied artists as Cher, Billy Joel, Joni Mitchell, Seal, Barbra Streisand, Andrea Bocelli, Britney Spears, Christina Aguilera, James Brown, Ariana Grande, Mariah Carey, Chaka Khan, Joe Cocker, The Doobie Brothers, "Weird Al" Yankovic, Jamey Johnson, George Thorogood, John Waite, Hilary Duff, Dan Hartman, Sheena Easton, Paul Stanley and Paul Young.

In 1987, Midnight was nominated for the Grammy Award for Best R&B Song for co-writing "Living in America", a song for which James Brown won the Best R&B Vocal Performance, Male. During the same year, Midnight co-wrote two Joe Cocker songs ("Trust in Me" and "A Woman Loves a Man") for Cocker's Unchain My Heart album which was produced by Charlie Midninght and Dan Hartman. In 1992, an updated version of "Trust in Me" (this time with Sass Jordan on backing vocals) was released on The Bodyguard: Original Soundtrack Album, which won the 1994 Grammy Award for Album of the Year.

In 1988, he was twice nominated for the Golden Globe Award for Best Original Song. Firstly, for the aforementioned "A Woman Loves a Man" which was re-released in the 1988 movie Bull Durham. Secondly, for the song "Why Should I Worry?" from the 1988 Disney animated film Oliver & Company. In 1994, the song "How Do You Stop"—which he co-wrote with Dan Hartman for James Brown's 1986 album Gravity—was covered by Joni Mitchell on her album Turbulent Indigo in a version that featured vocals by Seal. The album later won the 1996 Grammy Award for Best Pop Album. Charlie cowrote the song "One Heart, One Voice" Sung by Barbra Streisand, Maria Carey and Arian Grande which was nominated in 2025 for a Grammy for Record of the Year, Song of the Year and in the same year Charlie cowrote "Love Will Survive" from the Peacock series "The Tattooist of Auschwitz" sung by Barbra Streisand, which was nominated for an Emmy for Outstanding Original Music and Lyrics.

In 2004, Midnight signed a publishing deal with Famous Music Publishing. That same year, he wrote and produced "I'll Give Anything But Up" (sung by Hilary Duff) for the 2006 Grammy Award for Best Spoken Word Album for Children-winning children's album Marlo Thomas & Friends: Thanks & Giving All Year Long. In 2010, Midnight co-wrote with Jamey Johnson the song "My Way To You", which appeared on the latter's album The Guitar Song (nominated in 2011 for the Grammy Award for Best Country Album). The same year, Midnight co-wrote "Welcome To Burlesque"—Cher's first song in the feature film Burlesque. Its soundtrack album won the 2012 Grammy Award for Best Compilation Soundtrack for Visual Media.

In 2012, Midnight co-wrote two specialty lyrics for Barbra Streisand for her Back To Brooklyn tour on "As If We Never Said Goodbye" from Sunset Boulevard and "You're the Top" from Anything Goes. During the same year, "Welcome To Burlesque" (sung by Cher and co-written by Charlie Midnight) appeared on the Grammy-Nominated Soundtrack Album "Burlesque" (Best Compilation Soundtrack Album for Visual Media). In 2014, Midnight co-wrote the duet "I Still Can See Your Face" (performed by Streisand and Andrea Bocelli) for Streisand's Partners album. Partners reached No. 1, which made Streisand the only artist to have a Number One album in each of the past six different decades. Furthermore, the album was Grammy nominated for Best Traditional Pop Vocal Album. In 2018, Midnight co-wrote the song "The Rain Will Fall" with Streisand, Jay Landers, and Jonas Myrin.

Continuing his success in having his songs featured in films, Midnight co-wrote the song "Keep On Movin'" (sung by Thomas Hien) for the Disney feature film Alexander and the Terrible, Horrible, No Good, Very Bad Day and co-wrote "The Healing" (performed by Gedeon Luke and the People) featured in the 2015 film Get Hard. Collaborating with Idina Menzel and Walter Afanasieff, Midnight wrote "December Prayer," for Menzel's "Holiday Wishes": Number One Billboard Holiday Album

He co-wrote the song "Big Time Rush", which served as the theme song for the hit Nickelodeon series of the same name. He also won a BMI Cable Award at the 2006 BMI Awards for the theme song to the comedy series Daisy Does America. Midnight worked with Jordyn Jones on her song, I'm Dappin'. He has worked extensively as a writer and a producer for artists from all around the world. These include such notable international artists as Lin Yu-chun (Taiwan), Tata Young (Thailand), Chage and Aska (Japan), Peter Maffay and Yvonne Catterfeld (Germany), Gölä (Switzerland) Saint Lu (Austria) Time Bandits (Netherlands), El Último de la Fila (Spain), Rhydian (UK), Dodo and the Dodos (Denmark), Sahlene and Don Patrol (Sweden), Rodsogarden (Finland), Rouge (Brazil).

==== Artists ====
Listed alphabetically

- 2 Live Crew: "Living In America" - Co-Writer
- Anastacia: "Stay" – Writer on her album Resurrection
- Christina Aguilera: "This Year" (Christmas album My Kind of Christmas) – Writer
- Big Time Rush: Big Time Rush theme song – Writer
- Andrea Bocelli and Barbra Streisand duet: Writer "I Still Can See Your Face" on Ms. Streisand's number one Partners album
- Zach Brandon: Cowriter on the song “Live and Let Live (feat. Jallal)"
- James Brown: "Living In America" (Gravity album)
- Mariah Carey: "One Heart, One Voice" Sung with Barbra Streisand and Ariana Grande
- Kristin Chenoweth: Happiness Is...Christmas! album – Cowrote the song "The Stories That You Told” with Jay Landers
- Cher: "Welcome To Burlesque" (Film: Burlesque) Thanksgiving 2010 release
- Lauren Christy: "My Spot in the World" (102 Dalmatians soundtrack album) – Writer
- Joe Cocker: Unchain My Heart album; One Night Of Sin album – Producer and writer; "Love Lives On" (Harry & The Hendersons feature film) – Producer
- Miranda Cosgrove: "Raining Sunshine" End Title song and soundtrack album from Sony animated feature Cloudy With A Chance Of Meatballs - Writer
- The Doobie Brothers: "Cycles" Album – Writer and producer of various tracks including "The Doctor" (Top Five Single); Take Me To The Highway live album – Producer of album, writer of various tracks
- Hilary Duff: Lizzie McGuire soundtrack, Writer and producer; Hilary Duff Christmas Album ("Santa Claus Lane"), Writer and producer; Metamorphosis album, Writer and producer on various songs including the hit song, "So Yesterday"
- Sheena Easton: "When The Lightning Strikes Again" – Writer
- Kendra Erika: Cowriter on the song "Song Of Hope”
- Natalie Gelman: Streetlamp Musician – Writer and Producer
- Ariana Grande: "One Heart One Voice" Sung with Barbra Streisand and Mariah Carey
- Dan Hartman: I Can Dream About You album (except the title song and "Electricity") – Writer
- Hotel Blue: Cowriter on the song "The Blue Hotel" on the Big Night in Byzantium album
- Natalie Imbruglia: "Outside Looking In" – Writer
- Billy Joel: "Why Should I Worry" (Oliver & Company, Disney animated feature) – Writer
- Jamey Johnson: "My Way To You" – Writer
- Chaka Khan: "Can't Stop The Street" (Top Ten Dance Single – Krush Groove soundtrack) – Writer
- Lil' Romeo: Hilary Duff Christmas Album, duet on "Tell Me A Story" – Writer and producer
- Idina Menzel: Co-writing songs with Ms. Menzel and Walter Afanasieff for original musical; performs "God Save My Soul" from musical in concert; "December Prayer" – Writer on Ms. Menzel's Christmas album
- Joni Mitchell: "How Do You Stop" (Turbulent Indigo album) – Writer
- Barb Morrison: Producer during Morrison's time as the member of a band during the 1990s
- Rvkah: Cowriter on song "Christmas Love" on her Love EP
- Seal: "How Do You Stop" (duet w/ Mitchell, "Turbulent Indigo") – Writer
- Britney Spears: "Shadow" (In The Zone album) – Writer
- Paul Stanley: "It's Not Me" – Writer – Live to Win album
- Emma Stevens: To My Roots album (Cowriter on various songs); Atoms EP (Cowriter)
- Barbra Streisand: "Love Will Survive" Lyricist. Music by Hans Zimmer, Walter Afanasieff, Kara Talve for film, "The Tattooist of Auschwitz." "The Rain Will Fall" from the "Walls" Album Cowriter with Jay Landers Jonas Myrin & Barbra Streisand. 2012 "Back To Brooklyn" tour – Writer of specialty lyrics
- George Thorogood: "American Made" – Writer
- John Waite: "Sometimes" ("Rover" Album) – Writer
- "Weird Al" Yankovic: "Living With A Hernia (parody of "Living In America")
- Paul Young: "I'm Only Fooling Myself" (Time to Time album) – Writer

==== Films and soundtrack albums ====
Listed alphabetically

- 102 Dalmatians – "My Spot In The World" on soundtrack album – Writer
- Alexander And The Very Bad Day – "Keep On Movin"" – Writer
- Barbershop 2: The Next Cut - "The Healing" – Writer
- The Bodyguard – "Trust In Me" (Joe Cocker/Sass Jordan) – Writer/Producer
- Breakin' – "Breakin'...The Heart Of The Beat" (3-V) – Writer
- Bull Durham – "A Woman Loves A Man" (Joe Cocker) – Writer/Producer
- Burlesque: Starring Christina Aguilera And Cher: "Welcome To Burlesque" (Artist – Cher) – Writer
- Casual Sex? – "Behind Your Eyes" – Writer/Producer
- Cloudy With A Chance Of Meatballs: "Raining Sunshine" (Miranda Cosgrove) – Writer
- Cheaper By The Dozen: "What Christmas Should Be" (Hilary Duff)
- Come Away Home – Various Songs – Writer/Producer
- Desperado – "Back To The House That Love Built" (Tarantula) -Writer/ Producer
- Eye Of The Tiger – "Gravity" – Writer
- Fletch – "Get Outta Town" (Dan Hartman) – Writer
- Get Hard – Co-writer on the soundtrack song "The Healing"
- Great Expectations – "Walk This Earth Alone" (Lauren Christy) – Writer/Producer
- Green Street Hooligans – "One Blood" –Writer/Producer
- Gunmen – "This House" (The Cruzados) – Writer/Producer
- Harry and the Hendersons – "Love Lives On" (Joe Cocker) – Producer
- Iron Eagle ll – "Gimme Some Lovin'" – Producer
- The Jackal – "It's Over, It's Under" (DollsHead) – Writer/Producer
- Kim Possible: A Sitch In Time – "It's Just You" (LMNT) – Writer
- Krush Groove – "Can't Stop The Street" (Chaka Khan) – Writer
- The Lizzie McGuire Movie -"Why Not" (single) (Hilary Duff)- Writer, "Girl In The Band" (Hilary Duff)- Writer/Producer "Girl In The Band"(Haley Duff)- Writer & Producer
- Naomi & Wynonna: Love Can Build a Bridge – "Dream Time" – Writer
- Oliver & Company – "Why Should I Worry" (Billy Joel) – Writer
- Perfect – "Talking To The Wall" (Dan Hartman) – Writer
- Raise Your Voice – "Jericho" (Hilary Duff) – writer and producer
- Return to Me – "Here I Am" – Writer/Producer
- Ringmaster – "Living in America" (2 Live Crew version) – Writer
- Rock 'n' Roll High School Forever – "Riot In The Playground" – Writer
- Rocky IV – "Living In America" (James Brown) – Writer
- Ruthless People – "Waiting to See You" (Dan Hartman) -Writer
- The Santa Clause 2 – "Santa Claus Lane" (Hilary Duff) – Writer/Producer
- Street Fighter – "Something There" – (Chage & Aska, major Japanese recording stars)- Writer
- Teenage Mutant Ninja Turtles – "9.95" – Writer
- Teenage Mutant Ninja Turtles II – "Consciousness" – Writer
- The Tattooist of Auschwitz - wrote lyrics to "Love Will Survive" Sung by Barbra Streisand Music by Hans Zimmer, Walter Afanasieff, Kara Talve.
- Wild Things – "I Want What I Want" (Lauren Christy) – Writer

==== Other writer credits ====
| Year | Artist | Song | Album | Notes |
|---|---|---|---|---|
| 1984 | Dan Hartman | "We Are the Young" "Shy Hearts" "I'm Not a Rolling Stone" "Rage to Live" "Name of the Game" "Power of a Good Love" "Second Nature" "I Can't Get Enough" | I Can Dream About You | |
| 1984 | 3V | "Heart of the Beat" | Breakin' soundtrack | |
| 1985 | Chaka Khan | "(Krush Groove) Can't Stop The Street" | Krush Groove soundtrack | |
| 1985 | Dan Hartman | "Get Outta Town" | Fletch soundtrack | |
| 1985 | Dan Hartman | "Talking to the Wall" | Perfect soundtrack | |
| 1985 | Sheena Easton | "When the Lightning Strikes Again" | Do You | |
| 1986 | Dan Hartman | "Waiting to See You" | Ruthless People soundtrack | |
| 1986 | James Brown | "Living in America" | Gravity | |
| 1987 | John Waite | "Sometimes" | Rover's Return | |
| 1987 | Joe Cocker | "A Woman Loves a Man" "Trust in Me" "Satisfied" | Unchain My Heart | Writer and album co-producer. |
| 1988 | Dan Hartman | "Behind Your Eyes" | Casual Sex? soundtrack | |
| 1988 | The Insiders | "Gimme Some Lovin'" | Iron Eagle II soundtrack | |
| 1988 | Billy Joel | "Why Should I Worry?" | Oliver & Company soundtrack | |
| 1989 | The Doobie Brothers | "The Doctor" "Take Me to the Highway" | Cycles | Co-writer and album co-producer. |
| 1989 | Joe Cocker | "Letting Go" "Bad Bad Sign" | One Night of Sin | Writer and album producer. |
| 1989 | Joe Cocker | "Love Lives On" | Harry and the Hendersons soundtrack | Co-producer. |
| 1990 | Spunkadelic | "9.95" | Teenage Mutant Ninja Turtles: The Original Motion Picture Soundtrack | |
| 1991 | Dan Hartman | "(That's Your) Consciousness" | Teenage Mutant Ninja Turtles II The Secret of the Ooze: The Original Motion Picture Soundtrack | |
| 1991 | Paul Young | "I'm Only Fooling Myself" | From Time to Time – The Singles Collection | |
| 1991 | Corey Feldman & The Eradicators | "Riot in the Playground" | Rock 'n' Roll High School Forever | |
| 1991 | Quarterflash | "Diamonds in the Rough" | Girl in the Wind | Writer and producer. |
| 1992 | Joe Cocker featuring Sass Jordan | "Trust in Me" | The Bodyguard: Original Soundtrack Album | Writer and producer. |
| 1994 | Cruzados | "This House" | Gunmen soundtrack | Writer and producer. |
| 1994 | Chage and Aska | "Something There" | Street Fighter soundtrack | English lyrics. |
| 1994 | Joni Mitchell | "How Do You Stop" | Turbulent Indigo | Cover of the 1986 song by James Brown. |
| 1995 | Tito & Tarantula | "Back to the House That Love Built" | Desperado: The Soundtrack | Co-writer and co-producer. |
| 1995 | The Bonnevilles | "Dream Time" | Naomi & Wynonna: Love Can Build a Bridge soundtrack | |
| 1997 | Dollshead | "It's Over, It's Under" | The Jackal soundtrack | Writer and producer. |
| 1998 | Lauren Christy | "I Want What I Want" | Wild Things soundtrack | |
| 1998 | Lauren Christy | "Walk This Earth Alone" | Great Expectations soundtrack | |
| 1999 | 2 Live Crew | "Living in America" | Ringmaster soundtrack | Cover version of the James Brown hit song. |
| 2000 | Joey Gian | "Here I Am" | Return To Me soundtrack | |
| 2000 | Lauren Christy | "My Spot in the World" | 102 Dalmatians soundtrack | |
| 2000 | Christina Aguilera | "This Year" | My Kind of Christmas | |
| 2002 | Hilary Duff | "Santa Claus Lane" "I Heard Santa on the Radio" (with Christina Milian) "When the Snow Comes Down in Tinseltown" "Tell Me a Story (About the Night Before)" (with Lil' Romeo) "Same Old Christmas" (featuring Haylie Duff) | Santa Claus Lane | Co-writer and co-producer. |
| 2003 | George Thorogood & The Destroyers | "American Made" | Ride 'Til I Die | |
| 2003 | Britney Spears | "Shadow" | In The Zone | |
| 2003 | LMNT | "It's Just You" | Kim Possible soundtrack | |
| 2003 | Haylie Duff | "Girl in the Band" | The Lizzie McGuire Movie soundtrack | Co-writer and co-producer. |
| 2003 | Hilary Duff | "Why Not" | The Lizzie McGuire Movie soundtrack | |
| 2003 | Hilary Duff | "So Yesterday" "Workin' It Out" "Where Did I Go Right?" "The Math" "Love Just Is" "Metamorphosis" "Why Not" | Metamorphosis | Co-writer and co-producer. |
| 2003 | Hilary Duff | "What Christmas Should Be" | Cheaper by the Dozen soundtrack | |
| 2004 | Hilary Duff | "Weird" "Hide Away" "Dangerous to Know" "Who's That Girl?" "Cry""Haters" "Rock This World" "Jericho" | Hilary Duff | Co-writer and co-producer. |
| 2005 | Various | —N/a | Come Away Home soundtrack | Music supervisor. |
| 2005 | Terence Jay | "One Blood" | Green Street soundtrack | Writer and producer. |
| 2009 | Miranda Cosgrove | "Raining Sunshine" | Cloudy with a Chance of Meatballs soundtrack | |
| 2010 | Big Time Rush | "Big Time Rush" | BTR | |
| 2010 | Jamey Johnson | "My Way To You" | The Guitar Song | |
| 2010 | Cher | "Welcome To Burlesque" | Burlesque: Original Motion Picture Soundtrack | |
| 2013 | Barbra Streisand | "As If We Never Said Goodbye" "You're the Top" | Back to Brooklyn | Co-wrote specialty lyrics. |
| 2016 | Miggs | "Be Good to Yourself" and other songs | Miggs: The EP | Writer and producer. |

==== Television credits ====
| Year | Name | Song | Artist | Notes |
|---|---|---|---|---|
| 1995 | Happily Ever After: Fairy Tales for Every Child (Ep. "Hansel and Gretel") (HBO) | "Los Ninos Deliciosos" | Rosie Perez | |
| 1995 | Happily Ever After: Fairy Tales for Every Child (Ep. "Rapunzel") (HBO) | "Hoodoo Diva" | Whoopi Goldberg | |
| 1995 | Happily Ever After: Fairy Tales for Every Child (Ep. "Sleeping Rosita") (HBO) | "Que Es Esto" "Good Fairies Song" | Carmen Zapata; Vanessa Marquez | |
| 2005 | Daisy Does America (TBS) | "Daisy Does America" | —N/a | Main theme. |
| 2009–2013 | Big Time Rush (Nickelodeon) | "Big Time Rush" | Big Time Rush | Main theme. |

== Nominations ==
- Grammy Award Nomination for Best R&B Song – 1987 – "Living in America" performed by James Brown
- Golden Globe Award Nomination for Best Original Song – 1988 – "Why Should I Worry?" performed by Billy Joel, from Oliver & Company
- Golden Globe Award Nomination for Best Original Song – 1988 – "A Woman Loves a Man" performed by Joe Cocker, from Bull Durham
- Grammy Award for Best Album for Children – 1990 – Oliver & Company : Story and Songs from the Motion Picture performed by various artists
- BMI Cable Award – 2006 – Daisy Does America.
- Emmy nomination for Outstanding Original Music and Lyrics "Love Will Survive" by Barbra Streisand from the Peacock film, "The Tattooist of Auschwitz"
- Grammy Nomination “One Heart, One Voice” by Barbra Streisand, Mariah Carey, and Ariana Grande for of the Year, Song of the Year

== Writings ==
- Deserve's Got Nothing to Do With It: Five Elements That Will Help You Survive Your Emotional Journey to Success (2021). Virginia: Mascot Books. ISBN 9781684018352. In the book, Midnight mentions writing the screenplay Boulevard and the Beast—which was never released as a film.
- "The Tire Iron" (2021). Calliope on the Web, Winter 2021–Issue 170.

== Personal life ==
Midnight and his wife Susanna have a daughter, Shantie. Midnight has a daughter, Hannah, from a previous marriage.
