= Time Bandits (band) =

Dutch band

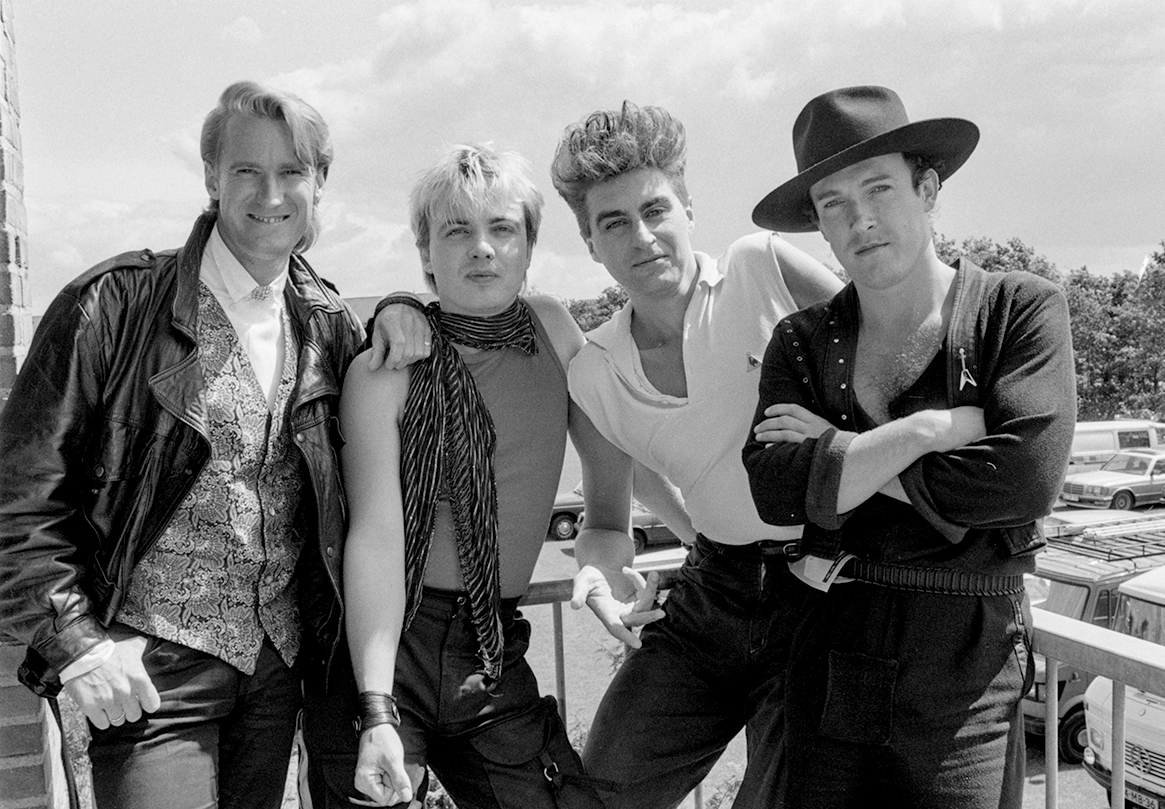
- Time Bandits in 1986

Background information
- Origin: Amsterdam, Netherlands
- Genres: New wave, post-disco, synthpop
- Years active: 1981–present
- Members: Alides Hidding; Marco Ligtenberg; Guus Strijbosch; Dave van den Dries

Time Bandits is a Dutch new wave band best known for their hits "I'm Specialized in You", "Endless Road" and "I'm Only Shooting Love".

== Formation ==
Time Bandits was formed in 1981 by Alides Hidding, who wrote most of the songs and sang lead vocals. Other band members were Marco Ligtenberg (keyboards), Guus Strijbosch (bass) and Dave van den Dries (drums). Time Bandits had hits on the American dance charts (Dance Club Songs) with the number 6 dance hit "Live It Up" in 1982 and "I'm Only Shooting Love", which peaked at number 2 in 1985.

By the mid-1980s, Time Bandits had also achieved success in Australia, where "I'm Only Shooting Love" and "Endless Road" (where its music video was filmed) were both top 10 hits. These singles and other hits such as "Listen to the Man with the Golden Voice", "Dancing on a String" and "I'm Specialized in You" were also successful in the Netherlands, Germany, France and New Zealand (where "I'm Only Shooting Love" hit number one in June 1984).

After moving from Europe to Los Angeles in 1989, Hidding has had his songs recorded by such artists as Jennifer Rush, The Nylons, and various European performers. He has established song-writing collaborations with such writers as Charlie Midnight (producer of Hidding's last album Can't Wait for Another World together with Dan Hartman), Jackie DeShannon, Pamela Phillips Oland, Dwayne Hitchings, Donny Markowitz and Todd Smallwood.

The versatility of Hidding is reflected in his capacity to adapt to a wide range of song-writing and producing styles. His works vary from R&B to blues, dance, rock and pop.

After an absence from the stage, Hidding began touring with his new band in 2006.

From July 2022 Alides Hidding, together with his road manager, have had a YouTube vlog "Roadie&Star react", where they listen to songs from the 80s up to the present day, and comment on the music and the music videos.

== Discography ==
=== Albums ===
- Time Bandits (1982) (CBS Records – CX 85543)
- Tracks (1983)
- Time Bandits (1984) [Compilation] - AUS #81
- Fiction (1985) (CBS Records – 25987) - AUS #96
- Can't Wait for Another World (1987) (CBS Records – 4508782)
- Greatest Hits (1990) [Compilation]
- As Life (2003)
- Out of the Blue (2012)

=== Singles ===
Year	Title	Peak chart positions				Album
Year	Title	NLD	AUS	BEL (Fl)	NZ	Album
1981	"Live It Up"	15	—	21	—	Time Bandits
1982	"Sister Paradise"	45	—	—	—	Time Bandits
1982	"I'm Specialized in You"	2	—	4	—	Time Bandits (1984)
1983	"Listen to the Man with the Golden Voice"	9	53	8	—	Tracks
1983	"I'm Only Shooting Love"	10	9	8	1	Tracks
1984	"Reach Out"	30	—	—	—	—N/a
1985	"Endless Road"	18	5	19	41	Fiction
1985	"Dancing on a String"	24	76	21	—	Fiction
1986	"I Won't Steal Away"	24	—	21	—	Fiction
1986	"Only a Fool"	48	—	—	—	Fiction
1987	"We'll Be Dancing"	59	—	—	—	Can't Wait for Another World
1987	"Wildfire"	65	—	—	—	Can't Wait for Another World
1988	"Can't Wait for Another World"	—	—	—	—	Can't Wait for Another World
1996	"Specialized in You" (reissue)	—	—	—	—	—N/a
2008	"Live It Up 2008" (Johan Gielen vs. Time Bandits)	17	—	—	—	—N/a
2013	"Love Is a Wild Thing"	—	—	—	—	Out of the Blue
2022	"Diamonds in the sand"	—	—	—	—	—N/a
