= I Can Dream About You =

1984 song from Streets of Fire soundtrack

Single by Dan Hartman

from the album I Can Dream About You and Streets of Fire: Music from the Original Motion Picture Soundtrack
- B-side: "Blue Shadows"
- Released: April 1984; August 1985 (UK re-issue)
- Recorded: 1983
- Genre: Pop rock; blue-eyed soul
- Length: 4:12; 3:50 (7")
- Label: MCA
- Songwriter: Dan Hartman
- Producers: Dan Hartman; Jimmy Iovine

Dan Hartman singles chronology
"All I Need" (1981)	"I Can Dream About You" (1984)	"We Are the Young" (1984)

Music video
- "I Can Dream About You" on YouTube

"I Can Dream About You" is a song written and performed by American singer-songwriter Dan Hartman on the soundtrack album of the film Streets of Fire. Released in 1984 as a single from the soundtrack, and included on Hartman's album I Can Dream About You, it reached number 6 on the Billboard Hot 100.

== Background ==
The song first appeared in Streets of Fire, where it was performed by the fictional R&B group "The Sorels". The real voice behind the version used in the film was Winston Ford, but Hartman's version was the one used on the soundtrack album and released as a single. In a Songfacts interview with the film's musical director, Kenny Vance, he recalled the following:

The same guy that sings lead on that and 'Countdown to Love,' a song that I wrote for the film, was a guy working at a Radio Shack (Winston Ford), and I think when you look at the film and The Sorels are singing it live in the movie, that was the version that was supposed to come out, and I recorded that version. But then when Dan Hartman heard it, I don't know what happened next, but I know that he took that guy's voice off and he put his own on, and he had a hit with it. Hollywood is a very slippery place.

Originally, producer Jimmy Iovine had asked Hartman to write a song for a film he was working on. Hartman was told that the song was going to be sung by four Black guys in a concert situation within the film, and Hartman ended up thinking about a demo he made of "I Can Dream About You". As described by Tuber (1985), Hartman went through some "legal maneuvering to get the benefit of his breakthrough". The use of the song in the film being performed by actors did not feature Hartman on vocals but rather Ford. After some negotiating to enforce the original contract, Hartman insisted he sing the song on the soundtrack, and that his version be released if a single were to be issued from the soundtrack album. Additionally, any music video had to feature his own voice using the song. These clauses helped Hartman become an "overnight sensation" despite the fact that Hartman had been a working musician since adolescence. In an interview snippet from Portzline (2014), Hartman elaborated on another controversy related to the song—stating that "...some people had a fit because it was my name and my voice coming out of this group that looked like the Temptations. It was a big mess, but it was the best I could do under the circumstance."

In the film, the Sorels are played by Stoney Jackson (lead singer), Grand L. Bush, Mykelti Williamson and Robert Townsend (the latter three portraying backing singers). In a 2012 interview, Williamson stated that people were initially confused and thought that Jackson was Hartman. As a result, Hartman was supposedly upset; however, he might have had a change of heart by the following year due to the "good publicity" that the confusion generated (Tuber, 1985). Although the choreography for the Sorels was arranged by Jeffrey Hornaday, the actors eventually improvised much of the dance moves with Hornaday’s support. Williamson further mentioned that he, Jackson, Bush and Townsend received vocal coaching from Jim Gilstrap and they provided background vocals for the track. In the vinyl releases, Hartman, Joe Pizzulo, and Ford are credited as providing backing vocals for the song. Thus, in the interview, Williamson may have been referring to the version that appeared in the film with Ford's vocals. Frank and George Simms, who perform as The Simms Brothers Band and worked as backup singers for artists such as David Bowie, revealed in a 2021 podcast that they sang on "I Can Dream About You" as a favor to Hartman but were uncredited due to the song's quick release thereafter.

Before Ford settled as a musician in Colorado, he went on to tour as a vocalist for artists such as the Platters, Earth, Wind & Fire, the Drifters and Phat Daddy. He died in a motor vehicle accident in 2007 in Denver.

== Album release and promotion ==
Both Hartman and Iovine worked on his 1984, same-titled solo album I Can Dream About You, following the song's use in the film. The album would spawn two other Top 40 charting singles on the US Billboard Hot 100 – "We Are the Young" and "Second Nature". A tour was also organized to promote the I Can Dream About You album and its singles, and Hartman toured alongside Toto in 1985. It was his first tour in a decade but also his last. The song was performed on this tour.

== Music videos and promotion ==
Two music videos accompanied the song. One does not feature Hartman and consists of scenes from Streets of Fire, intercut with footage of the fictional Sorels miming the song as part of a live performance. In the second video, filmed at the Hard Rock Cafe in London, Hartman appears as a bartender trying to charm a young woman (played by Joyce Hyser), singing to her as the Sorels' performance plays on a TV set hanging above the bar. In a 2010 interview with Hyser for the blog Old School: Back to the 80s, she was asked how she came to feature in the video. She replied, "I knew Dan's manager and he asked me if I would do it. We shot at the Hard Rock in London. I honestly remember very little about it, but Dan was very nice and I absolutely love that song." While recording a mimed TV performance of the song, Hartman explained why one music video featured actors: "The producers and directors of Streets of Fire wanted the best of everything, so they hired the best singers, the best dancers and best actors to play the parts in the film. So the singers in 'I Can Dream About You' who are the Sorels are actually actors, and I wrote and sang this song."

Aside from the two music videos which accompanied the song, Hartman appeared on various American and European TV shows to perform the song once it was released as a single. On the musical variety show Soul Train, during December 1984, Hartman dubbed the song with his touring band, along with "We are the Young", and later appeared on the show solo in May 1985 to perform both "I Can Dream About You" and "Second Nature" alone, but with live vocal. He also dubbed the song on the music-performance program American Bandstand in December 1984, with his touring band. "Second Nature" was also performed, and both performances aired on the January 12, 1985, episode of the show. In November 1984, Hartman and his band performed the song on Late Night with David Letterman, along with "We Are the Young". It was also dubbed on the American syndicated half hour television show This Week's Music, where his name was incorrectly spelled as 'Harkman'.

Within the UK, Hartman performed the song on Top of the Pops, dated August 29, 1985. He also dubbed the song on Cheggers Plays Pop, dated October 31, 1985.

== Critical reception ==
Alex Henderson of AllMusic reviewed the I Can Dream About You album and stated "This excellent album finds Hartman showing his enthusiasm for R&B on pop/rock gems that range from the hit title song and the anthemic 'We Are the Young' to the Motown-tinged 'Name of the Game' and the new wave-ish 'Electricity'."

In the Billboard magazine of November 3, 1984, another review of the album was published in the Pop Picks section, which meant that Billboard predicted the album to hit the top half of the chart. The review stated "The title track survived the failure of the 'Streets of Fire' motion picture to become a recent top 10 smash. Hartman follows it with an album reflecting the same broad-based pop/rock appeal."

== Track listing ==
7" single

1. "I Can Dream About You" – 3:50
2. "Blue Shadows" (performed by The Blasters) – 3:14

7" single (American promo release)

1. "I Can Dream About You" (Long Solo Version)
2. "I Can Dream About You" (Short Solo Version) – 3:51

7" single (Brazilian release)

1. "I Can Dream About You" (Versão Solo Longa)
2. "I Can Dream About You" (Versão Solo Curta) – 3:51

7" single (1985 UK reissue)

1. "I Can Dream About You" (Edited Version) – 3:51
2. "Instant Replay" – 3:25

12" single (American and Italian release)

1. "I Can Dream About You" (Jellybean Remix) – 7:31
2. "I Can Dream About You" – 4:23
3. "I Can Dream About You" (Instrumental) – 4:23

12" single (Australian, Canadian and US #2 release)

1. "I Can Dream About You" (Extended Remix) – 5:56
2. "I Can Dream About You" (Jellybean Remix) – 7:31

12" single (American promo release)

1. "I Can Dream About You" (Jellybean Remix) – 7:31
2. "I Can Dream About You" – 4:23
3. "I Can Dream About You" (Instrumental) – 4:23

12" single (German release)

1. "I Can Dream About You" (Jellybean Remix) – 7:31
2. "I Can Dream About You" (Extended Remix) – 5:56

12" single (Spanish release)

1. "I Can Dream About You" (Jellybean Remix) – 7:31
2. "I Can Dream About You" (Instrumental) – 4:23
3. "Blue Shadows" (performed by The Blasters) – 3:14

12" single (1985 UK release)

1. "I Can Dream About You" (Extended Mix) – 5:56
2. "I Can Dream About You" (7" Version) – 3:51
3. "Instant Replay" – 8:18

12" single (1985 UK white label promo release)

1. "I Can Dream About You" (Extended Mix) – 5:56
2. "Instant Replay" – 8:18

== Personnel ==
Sourced from the original album liner notes

- Dan Hartman – lead vocals, backing vocals, all instruments (except as noted below)
- Art Wood – additional drums
- Richie Zito – additional guitar
- Billy Payne – acoustic piano
- Eddie Watkins – bass
- Bobbye Hall – percussion
- Winston Ford – backing vocals
- Joe Pizzulo – backing vocals

Production

- Dan Hartman – production, engineering
- Jimmy Iovine – production
- Humberto Gatica – mixing
- Shelly Yakus – additional engineering
- Gabe Veltri – additional engineering
- Steve Marcussen – mastering

== Chart performance ==
=== Weekly charts ===
Weekly chart performance for "I Can Dream About You"
Chart (1984–1985)	Peak position
Australia (Kent Music Report)	3
Belgian Singles Chart (Vl)	16
Canada (The Record)	10
Canada Adult Contemporary (RPM)	7
Canada (RPM)	11
Dutch Singles Chart	18
Irish Singles Chart	4
New Zealand Singles Chart	47
South African Singles Chart	7
Swedish Singles Chart	13
UK Singles Chart	12
US Billboard Hot 100	6
US Billboard Adult Contemporary	7
US Billboard Hot Dance/Club Play	8
US Billboard Hot Black Singles	60
US Cash Box Top 100 Singles	6

=== Year-end charts ===
Year-end chart performance for "I Can Dream About You"
Chart (1984)	Rank
Australia (Kent Music Report)	24
Canada RPM Top Singles	93
US Billboard Hot 100	29
US Cash Box	60

== Cover versions ==
In 2005, American pop rock duo Daryl Hall & John Oates released a cover version (with changed lyrics), as a single from their album Our Kind of Soul.

According to Daryl Hall, Hartman had initially written the song with Hall & Oates in mind, and offered the song to them to record as their own. Hall & Oates declined, as their new album was about to be released. When performing the song live in February 2005, Hall revealed before the performance:

Here's a song that we did on the new album that we sort of did twenty years late. An old friend of ours, Dan Hartman, wrote this song. I remember back in the day he came up to me and said 'You know, I have this great song I wrote for you guys. It's you, you know? – you have to sing this song.' And unfortunately we had just finished an album, we couldn't put it on the album so I said sorry Dan. About six months later I was watching MTV and there it was, and it was a hit for him, God bless him. So here we are twenty years later, I hope he's hearing it, and I hope he enjoys it.
