= We Are the Young =

Single by Dan Hartman

from the album I Can Dream About You
- B-side: "I'm Not a Rolling Stone"
- Released: September 6, 1984 (US); 14 January 1985 (UK)
- Recorded: 1984
- Genre: Pop, freestyle, dance-pop
- Length: 4:20
- Label: MCA
- Songwriter(s): Dan Hartman; Charlie Midnight
- Producer(s): Hartman

Dan Hartman singles chronology
"I Can Dream About You" (1984)	"We Are the Young" (1984)	"Name of the Game" (1984)

"We Are the Young" is a 1984 crossover single by American musician Dan Hartman. The song was released on September 6, 1984 by MCA as the second single from his fifth studio album, I Can Dream About You. It was written by Hartman and Charlie Midnight, produced by Hartman. The single was his third and last to hit number one on the dance chart in the U.S. The single also crossed over to the pop chart where it peaked at number twenty-five and on the soul singles chart, where it reached number fifty-eight.

== Background and music video ==
According to Hartman's frequent writing partner Charlie Midnight, “We Are the Young” was initially slated for the film Breakin’:

“…Dan was contacted by the music supervisor for a film called "Breakin'". He wanted Dan to write a song for the main dance sequence….Dan was wary of doing it because it was a fairly low budget film and he questioned its chances for success. I, however, was anxious to do it for the synchronization fee. It was almost noon and Dan said, "if you have a lyric by 5 today, I'll write the music." I completed a lyric before 5 for "We Are The Young," and the music supervisor loved it. The dance sequence was cut to the song with Dan as the artist and everyone was happy. Then Jimmy Iovine, who was producing Dan's solo album, heard the song and wanted it for Dan's album as the first single. Dan withdrew the song amidst much furor. The dance number had already been cut to the song and withdrawing it was a big problem. As a result, we wrote another song called "Heart Of The Beat." Dan did not want to be the artist on this song and so we created a faux group called '3V' which was, in fact, Dan and me…In the end, "Heart Of the Beat," was not used as the main song but instead a song sung by Ollie and Jerry called "There's No Stopping Us" replaced "We Are The Young," and, powered by the momentum of the film, hit the top of the charts…

In a 2021 interview, Midnight elaborated and stated that the music supervisor gave the assignment to Ollie and Jerry and they wrote "There's No Stopping Us" "to the same exact beat and bass line of ['We Are the Young']". A music video directed by Doug Dowdle was released in 1984. The fictional Sorels from the film Streets of Fire (played by Stoney Jackson, Grand L. Bush, Mykelti Williamson and Robert Townsend) appeared in the video. In a 2012 interview, Williamson claimed that the video was filmed right away to dispel the confusion surrounding who sang “I Can Dream About You”—as listeners typically confused Stoney Jackson as being Dan Hartman. Upon learning of this, Williamson requested that his manager negotiate that each of the actors be paid $5000.00 each to appear in the video. Williamson claimed that they were all paid the requested amount and, in the video, the Sorels (sans Townsend) dance on the stage with Hartman after he points at them enthusiastically in the audience near the video’s conclusion.

== Chart positions ==
Chart (1984)	Peak position
U.S. Billboard Hot 100	25
U.S. Billboard Hot Black Singles	58
U.S. Billboard Hot Dance Club Play	1
