= Dan Hartman =

American musician (1950–1994)

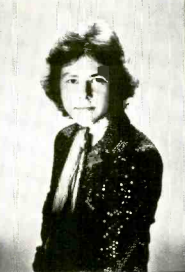
- Hartman in 1975

Background information
- Born: Daniel Earl Hartman; December 8, 1950; West Hanover Township, Pennsylvania, U.S.
- Died: March 22, 1994 (aged 43) Westport, Connecticut, U.S.
- Genres: Pop; pop rock; disco
- Occupations: Musician; singer; songwriter; producer
- Instruments: Guitar; keyboards; bass; vocals
- Works: Studio Albums; Singles
- Years active: 1963–1994
- Labels: Blue Sky; Atlantic; MCA; Private
- Website: danhartman.com

Daniel Earl Hartman (December 8, 1950 – March 22, 1994) was an American pop rock musician. Among songs he wrote and recorded were "Free Ride" as a member of the Edgar Winter Group, and the solo hits "Relight My Fire", "Instant Replay", "I Can Dream About You", "We Are the Young" and "Second Nature".

"I Can Dream About You", his most successful US hit, reached No. 6 on the Billboard Hot 100 in 1984. The James Brown song "Living in America", which Hartman co-wrote and produced, reached No. 4 on March 1, 1986.

Hartman wrote the 1980 disco song "Love Sensation" recorded by Loleatta Holloway, which has been sampled on numerous records, including the 1989 Black Box track "Ride on Time".

== Early life ==
Hartman was born on December 8, 1950, to Carl Hartman (1921–2006) and Pauline Angeloff (1925–1999) near Pennsylvania's capital, Harrisburg, in West Hanover Township, Dauphin County. His father served as an aerial gunner during World War II, before working for the U.S. Postal Service. His maternal side of the family originated from Yugoslavia (ethnic Macedonians).

Both of his parents had musical talents. His father played the saxophone and clarinet whereas his mother sang on the radio during her teenage years. Hartman was a child prodigy and studied classical piano until the age of 9. He attended John Harris High School, where he sang for the John Harris Choir and partook in journalism and theater as extracurricular activities.

== Career ==
=== The Legends and the Edgar Winter Group ===
Hartman joined his first band the Legends at the age of thirteen in 1964 at the request of his older brother David (Dave) who asked him to play keyboards. Hartman was initially reluctant to join, as he gravitated towards Motown rather than the Beatles-esque sound that the band members favored. The original lineup consisted of Hartman (keyboards), Dave (guitar and vocals), Denny Woolridge (bass) and Ralph Swartz (drums). A later member was Dave Cope on bass. From its inception, the Legends played at various spots throughout Central Pennsylvania, including local churches, dances, rock shows and outdoor concerts. The Legends initially started out as a soul group, but transitioned from a psychedelic rock to hard rock band by the early 1970s.

By the early 1970s, Dave had left the Legends and Hartman became the band leader with Larry Sadler on drums and Joe Caloiero on bass. Hartman wrote much of the band's music and played electric piano, organ, and guitar, but despite the release of a number of recordings, none turned out to be widespread hits. Their first record release was a recording of Cat Stevens' "Baby Get Your Head Screwed on Right" on the Up label.

They next released a two-sider with the Bridge Society label consisting of the songs "Keep On Running", a song popularized by the Spencer Davis Group, and "Cheating", originally recorded by the Animals. Their third release was the Hartman-penned songs "High Towers"/"Fever Games" on Railroad House Records. The band also recorded "Sometimes I Can't Help It" and "Jefferson Strongbox". While part of the Legends, Hartman worked as a banker for a time and wore a fake mustache in the promos so that his employers would not recognize him.

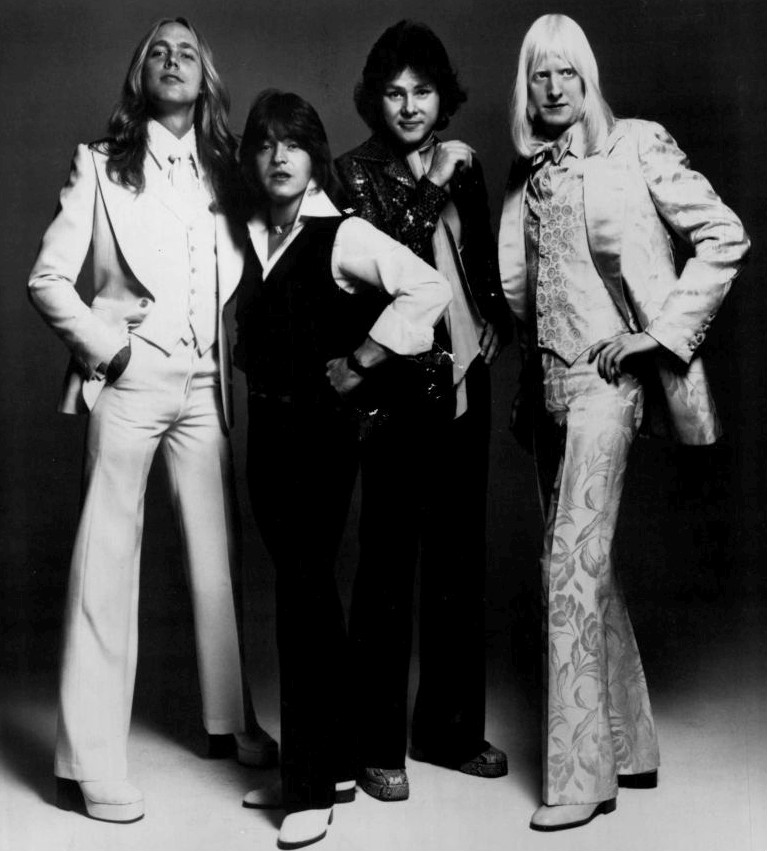
Hartman with the Edgar Winter Group in 1975, third from left

Hartman began sending demo tapes of the Legends' original material to gain national attention. He enlisted the help of Ronnie G. Shaeffer, a major radio personality in Central Pennsylvania who not only listened to the works and provided honest criticism to Hartman but also offered record label connections. In 1971, upon listening to the 13-song demo tape, Steve Paul, President of Blue Sky Records, introduced Hartman to Edgar Winter—who had recently disbanded White Trash and was seeking new members for his next musical venture.

Hartman subsequently spent a period of time backing the Johnny Winter Band (Edgar Winter was Johnny Winter's younger brother) and left the Legends to join Edgar Winter's lineup. The Legends continued to record with Joe Caloiero on lead vocals and bass, Larry Swartzwelder on guitar, and later Dean Lescallette and Gene Brenner on rhythm guitar. They released "Rock n Roll Woman", written by Hartman, and "Problems", written by Caloiero, on Hartman's Heart label. The Legends disbanded by the mid-1970s.

In 1972, Hartman joined the Edgar Winter Group, where he played bass, wrote or co-wrote many of their songs, and sang on three of their albums: They Only Come Out at Night, Shock Treatment, and The Edgar Winter Group with Rick Derringer. He wrote and sang the band's second biggest pop hit, "Free Ride", in 1972. The ballad "Autumn" on Edgar's LP They Only Come Out at Night was a regional radio hit in New England. Hartman wrote the band's charting singles "Easy Street" and "River's Risin" from the Shock Treatment album. He became known for wearing the Bass Suit, which he designed with Los Angeles couturier Bill Witten out of a rubbery fabric that allowed Hartman to insert a bass guitar in a pelvic pocket.

=== Solo career ===
==== Albums and unreleased work ====
Upon launching a solo career in 1976, he released a promotional album titled Who Is Dan Hartman and Why Is Everyone Saying Wonderful Things About Him?. It was a compilation disc including songs from Johnny Winter and the Edgar Winter Group. His second release, Images, was his first true album and featured ex-Edgar Winter Group members Edgar Winter, Ronnie Montrose and Rick Derringer and guests Clarence Clemons and Randy Brecker.

In late 1978, partly due to being introduced by the Studio 54 sound system, Hartman reached No. 1 on the Dance Charts with the disco single "Instant Replay" (the title track of his third full-length album Instant Replay) which crossed over to No. 29 on the Billboard Hot 100 in 1979 and reached the Top 10 on the UK charts. Musicians Hartman worked with on the associated album included Vinnie Vincent and G. E. Smith. This was followed by his second chart topper, 1979's "Relight My Fire", the title track of his fourth full-length album Relight My Fire, which featured friend Loleatta Holloway on vocals. An instrumental version of the song later became the theme for the NBC talk show Tomorrow.

In 1984, Hartman was back on the charts again with the single "I Can Dream About You", which was featured on his album of the same name, and the Streets of Fire soundtrack. The tune reached No. 6 on the U.S. charts, and on re-release in 1985, No. 12 in the UK. Hartman was featured as a bartender in one of the two videos that were released for the single, which received heavy rotation on MTV. Note that the single and album version of "I Can Dream About You" is sung by Hartman. Within the film Streets of Fire, the song is performed by a fictional vocal group called the Sorels, whose lead singer is played by Stoney Jackson. The actual vocal in the film was performed by Winston Ford. In 1985, Hartman scored a third Number 1 single on the Dance Music charts, "We Are the Young". The single "Second Nature" also charted during this period. He toured with Toto in 1985.

In 1985 and 1986, Hartman worked on a studio album, White Boy. He wanted the album to have a darker and more mature sound than his previous work. The album was completed in 1986, but the record label, MCA, thought it was too dissimilar to Hartman's previous work, especially "I Can Dream About You", and refused to release it. White Boy has never been released. Some test pressings of the album are now held by collectors, and some of the songs from the album are available on the internet. One song from the album, "Waiting to See You", was used in the 1986 film Ruthless People and its accompanying soundtrack album, and was subsequently released as a single. "First Impression", another song that was to appear on the unreleased album, was sung by Nancy Martinez on her 1989 album Unpredictable.

In 1989, he released his last studio album New Green Clear Blue, an instrumental new age-styled album.

==== Producing, songwriting, and other collaborations ====
Hartman worked as a songwriter, producer, and collaborated with such artists as Peter Brown (Stargazer, 1979), the Plasmatics (Hartman produced 1981's Metal Priestess; he also produced a demo version of Coup d'Etat in 1982, which was released as Coup de Grace in 2000), Nona Hendryx (she even co-wrote the song "Electricity" with Hartman, which was featured on his 1984 I Can Dream About You album), James Brown (Gravity; 1986), Steve Winwood (Hartman provided backing vocals on "The Finer Things", which was featured on Winwood's 1986 album Back in the High Life), Jenny Burton (Souvenirs; 1986), Jackie Chan (Hartman's song "Only For Your Love" was featured on the album Shangri-La; 1986), Time Bandits (Can't Wait for Another World, 1987; co-produced with Midnight), John Waite (the song "Sometimes", cowritten by Hartman and Midnight, was featured on the 1987 album Rover's Return), Paul King (Joy; 1987), D-Project (Prototype; 1988), Tina Turner (Foreign Affair; 1989), Joe Cocker (Unchain My Heart and One Night of Sin; 1987 and 1989 respectively), Roger Christian (Checkmate; 1989), Holly Johnson (Blast; 1989), Living in a Box (Gatecrashing; 1989), Dusty Springfield (Reputation; 1990), Tom Robinson (We Never Had It So Good – later re-released as Blood Brother; 1990), Bonnie Tyler (Bitterblue; 1991), The Fabulous Pop Tarts - a musical duo composed of Fenton Bailey and Randy Barbato (1992; Hartman produced the song "Smile"), and Valerie's Garten (Valerie's Garten; 1992).

In an interview snipped from Portzline (2014), Hartman stated that he started producing at an early age:

I started producing before I even joined the Legends—around 1962... I produced some local R&B, rock and gospel acts at Baldwin Sound in Mechanicsburg [Pennsylvania]. People would hear what I'd done on someone else's record and call me up and ask if I'd produce them, too. I even wrote and recorded an advertising jingle for Sutliff Chevrolet out on Paxton Street when I was 16. So it's always been something that I could fall back on throughout my career—to keep my mind going, to keep me musically inspired, and to keep me moving without having to make statements of my own.

Hartman served as a producer for the Legends. Around 1976, Hartman began using one of the rooms of a colonial home in Westport, Connecticut, (dubbed "The Schoolhouse") to serve as a recording studio. The rest of the house's rooms were wired for recording and to allow for different sounds by the artists. He did not charge exorbitant rates, so that new acts at the time such as the Outsets could record demos. Hartman produced albums for artists such as .38 Special, Foghat, David Johansen and Rick Derringer. During late 1977, blues legend Muddy Waters used "The Schoolhouse" to record his album I'm Ready. Hartman ran the recording board for the sessions and Johnny Winter served as the producer. In 1971, Hartman produced the Hydraulic Peach for Arpeggio Records. Hartman wrote and produced the 1980 disco hit "Love Sensation" performed by Holloway.

In 1981, Hartman was among the lineup for Hilly Michaels' albums Calling All Girls and Lumia. Hartman wrote the song "It's Never Too Late", which was sung by Diana Ross and featured on her 1981 album Why Do Fools Fall in Love. In 1982, Hartman produced Average White Band's album Cupid's in Fashion. The album was recorded at Sigma Sound Studios in New York with additional recordings done at "The Schoolhouse". In a 2016 interview, Hartman's close friend Blanche Napoleon—who provided backing vocals for "Instant Replay" and his other early albums—revealed that he created music for Gillette commercials around 1982 (she even provided background harmonies for one of the commercials). She worked with him on some of his other commercial work.

In 1983, Hartman played bass on the song "Speechless" featured on Ian Hunter's album All of the Good Ones Are Taken. Hartman co-wrote the song "Heart Skip Too Many Beats" with Janis Ian and it was featured on her 1984 album Uncle Wonderful (Hartman performed with Ian on the track). Around 1984, Hartman also worked as a lyricist and producer for Rugsted & Kreutzfeldt's album Sold Out (also referred to as R'n'K Band).

Aside from focusing on his solo career in 1984, Hartman provided background vocals for John Jarrett's Tribe's self-titled album. More so, in 1984, Hartman arranged and engineered Neil Sedaka's album Come See About Me. Hartman last worked as an engineer for Sedaka on the musician's 1981 album Neil Sedaka: Now. Hartman produced the song "I Won't Steal Away" (which he co-wrote with Midnight and Alides Hidding) for the band Time Bandits, which appeared on their 1985 album Fiction. Hartman also produced Time Bandits' B-side track "Cool World", which was unreleased on any album. In 1986, Hartman was reported to be producing Lou Gramm's first solo album (Gramm was then the lead singer of Foreigner), though the opportunity did not materialize. In 1990, Hartman and Midnight wrote and produced the theme song for the television show Guys Next Door.

==== Soundtracks ====
In 1984, Hartman also performed "Heart of the Beat" under the band name 3V with Charlie Midnight for the soundtrack of Breakin' (directed by Joel Silberg). According to Midnight, the fictional 3V was created because nobody else wanted to do the song. The song resulted in Midnight receiving a publishing deal, and he and Hartman even performed the song during a spring break festival in Fort Lauderdale, Florida.

In 1985, Hartman's song "Talking To The Wall" was featured on the soundtrack to the film Perfect starring Jamie Lee Curtis and John Travolta. Hartman's song "Get Outta Town", co-written with Midnight and co-produced with Richard Landis, was featured on the Fletch soundtrack." He closed the year cowriting "(Krush Groove) Can't Stop the Street" with Charlie Midnight for the film Krush Groove. The song was performed by Chaka Khan.

He also co-produced a version of the song "Great Gosh O Mighty" for the film Down and Out in Beverly Hills. For his 1986 album Lifetime Friend, Little Richard, who performed the song in the aforementioned film, used a different version.

Hartman produced and co-wrote "Living in America", a No. 4 hit for James Brown which appeared on the soundtrack of the feature film Rocky IV (1985). The song was the last of Brown's 44 hit recordings to appear on the Billboard top 40 charts. The track also appeared on the Hartman produced album Gravity. In 1987, Hartman and Charlie Midnight were nominated for a Grammy Award for Best R&B Song. Brown won a Grammy Award for Best Male R&B Vocal Performance.

In 1988, Hartman co-wrote the song "Why Should I Worry?" with Charlie Midnight for the Walt Disney Animation Studios film Oliver & Company (performed by Billy Joel). The work "Behind Your Eyes", which Hartman cowrote with Midnight, appeared on the soundtrack for 1988's Casual Sex?. Also, in 1988, Hartman dueted with Denise Lopez on the Scrooged soundtrack, "The Love You Take". In 1990, he co-wrote with longtime collaborator Charlie Midnight 9.95, performed by Spunkadelic, for Teenage Mutant Ninja Turtles: The Movie. In 1991, Hartman recorded "(That's Your) Consciousness" for the soundtrack to Teenage Mutant Ninja Turtles II: The Secret of the Ooze.

== Covers and sampling of his work ==
In 1976, Sérgio Mendes & Brasil '77 did an arrangement of the song "Tell Me in a Whisper" (which had been co-written by Hartman and Winter) on the Homecooking album. In 1984, "Relight My Fire" was covered by Costa Anadiotis' band Café Society. Eric Martin covered Hartman's "I'm Only Foolin' Myself", a song he featured on the unreleased White Boy album, on his self-titled 1986 album Eric Martin. "Love Sensation" was sampled in 1989 Black Box track "Ride on Time" and 1991's "Good Vibrations" by Marky Mark and the Funky Bunch. Holloway appeared in the music video during the chorus portion.

In January 1990, a cover version of "Instant Replay" recorded by the British duo Yell! became a top 10 hit. In 1991, Paul Young featured a cover version of "I'm Only Foolin' Myself" on his compilation album From Time to Time – The Singles Collection. In 1991, Marc Anthony covered the song "Name of the Game", featured on Hartman's I Can Dream About You album, on his collaboration album with Little Louie Vega entitled When the Night Is Over.

== Personal life and death ==
Hartman was never married and had no children. He died on March 22, 1994, at his Westport, Connecticut, home from a brain tumor, at the age of 43. A closeted gay man, he received a diagnosis of HIV in the late 1980s. He kept his HIV status a secret and did not seek treatment, even after friend and intermittent collaborator Holly Johnson, formerly of the band Frankie Goes to Hollywood, announced his own HIV status in 1993.

In May 1994, the "Dan Hartman: A Celebration of His Life and Music" memorial concert was performed at New York's Sound Factory Bar. Nona Hendryx, Loleatta Holloway, and producer Frankie Knuckles were among the participants.

== Legacy ==
Hartman has been renowned for his musical versatility. In his last will and testament, Hartman created the Dan Hartman Arts and Music Foundation, located in Los Angeles, California with Charlie Midnight as his sole trustee. At the time of his death, Hartman was recording a solo album for CHAOS/Columbia. The record label had no immediate plans to release Hartman's unfinished work.

In 1996, EMI Music Publishing purchased Hartman's complete catalog. The same year, Tom Robinson released the song "Connecticut" in memory of Hartman. The song appears on Robinson's album Having It Both Ways. Years after Robinson's tribute, Kathy Hartman—as frontwoman of the band Signal 30—released "A Song for Dan" in memory of her brother. She has also released the song "Bad Movies", which she had co-written with her late brother.

At the time of his death, Hartman's music was enjoying a revival of sorts: a cover version of "Relight My Fire" became a British number-one hit for Take That and Lulu in 1993. Sales of Hartman's solo recordings, group efforts, production, songwriting and compilation inclusions had exceeded 50 million records worldwide. In October 1994, Joni Mitchell covered "How Do You Stop" on her Turbulent Indigo album, which later won the Grammy Award for Best Pop Vocal Album. Around December 1994, the album Keep the Fire Burnin' was posthumously released – a compilation featuring remixes of earlier hits and previously unreleased material.

The album spawned two singles; "The Love in Your Eyes" and "Keep the Fire Burnin'", the latter featuring Holloway. Hartman's version of "Free Ride" was featured in Mighty Morphin Power Rangers: The Movie the year after his death. T.M. Stevens released his album Out of Control in 1995, which featured the song "The Gift" (written by Hartman and Midnight). In 1996, Audio Adrenaline included a cover version of "Free Ride" on their album Bloom. In 2003, Ricky Martin covered "Relight My Fire" with two versions: one featuring Holloway's original vocals and another with Anastacia singing Holloway's portion.

In 2006, "I Can Dream About You" was featured in the video game Grand Theft Auto: Vice City Stories. In 2009, "Relight My Fire" was featured in the video game Grand Theft Auto: The Ballad of Gay Tony. In 2010, folk rockers Louis Barabbas & the Bedlam Six turned "Relight My Fire" into an ode to whiskey.

In 2020, Hartman was inducted into the Central Pennsylvania Music Hall of Fame with Kathy Hartman accepting the honor on his behalf. Other inductees included Poison, Bobby Troup, and the Sharks.

In honor of Pride Month 2021, Hiro Clark—in collaboration with Scissor Sisters member Ana Matronic—launched the "Cowley Hartman Russell" T-shirt to honor Hartman and other legendary disco producers Patrick Cowley and Arthur Russell. "I Can Dream About You" was featured in the episode "Ruminations: Big and Little Bullys" of the HBO television series Euphoria in 2022.

== Discography ==
=== Studio albums ===
Year	Album	Peak chart positions	
Year	Album	US	US R&B
1976	Who Is Dan Hartman? (Promo only)	—	—
1976	Images	—	—
1978	Instant Replay	189	67
1979	Relight My Fire	80	—
1981	It Hurts to Be in Love	—	—
1984	I Can Dream About You	55	—
1989	New Green Clear Blue	—	—
"—" denotes releases that did not chart.

=== Unreleased album ===
- White Boy (1986)

=== Compilation albums ===
- Keep the Fire Burnin' (1994)
- Superhits (2004)

=== Singles ===
Year	Single	Chart positions									Certifications	Album
Year	Single	US	US R&B	US Adult	US Dance	AUS	CAN	IRE	NZ	UK	Certifications	Album
1976	"High Sign"	—	—	—	—	—	—	—	—	—		Images
1977	"Lighthouse"	—	—	—	—	—	—	—	—	—		Images
1978	"Instant Replay"	29	44	—	1	6	16	—	5	8	RIAA: Gold; BPI: Silver	Instant Replay
1978	"Chocolate Box"	—	—	—	—	—	—	—	—	—		Instant Replay
1979	"Time and Space"	—	—	—	—	—	—	—	—	— (Note: This single did not enter the UK Singles Chart, but did reach number 115 on the Record Business Singles Chart.)		Instant Replay
1979	"This Is It" (b/w "Countdown")	91	—	—	—	—	—	—	—	17		Instant Replay
1979	"Hands Down"	—	—	—	26	—	—	—	—	— (Note: This single did not enter the UK Singles Chart, but did reach number 103 on the Record Business Singles Chart.)		Relight My Fire
1979	"Free Ride" (Note: Also on the soundtrack album for Mighty Morphin Power Rangers: The Movie.)	—	—	—	—	—	—	—	—	—		Relight My Fire
1979	"Boogie All Summer"	—	—	—	—	—	—	—	—	— (Note: This single did not enter the UK Singles Chart, but did reach number 77 on the Record Business Singles Chart.)		—N/a (Note: Unreleased promo single, featured on the "April Music" LP.)
1980	"Vertigo" / "Relight My Fire"	105	—	—	1	—	—	—	—	— (Note: This single did not enter the UK Singles Chart, but did reach number 103 on the Record Business Singles Chart.)		Relight My Fire
1981	"It Hurts to Be in Love"	72	—	—	48	—	—	—	—	—		It Hurts to Be in Love
1981	"Heaven in Your Arms"	86	—	—	—	—	—	—	—	—		It Hurts to Be in Love
1981	"All I Need"	110	—	41	—	—	—	—	—	—		It Hurts to Be in Love
1984	"I Can Dream About You" (Note: Also on the soundtrack for Streets of Fire.)	6	60	7	8	3	11	4	47	12		I Can Dream About You
1984	"We Are the Young"	25	58	—	1	—	—	—	—	—		I Can Dream About You
1984	"Name of the Game"	—	—	—	—	—	—	—	—	—		I Can Dream About You
1985	"Second Nature"	39	—	19	40	—	—	—	—	66		I Can Dream About You
1985	"Get Outta Town"	—	—	—	—	—	—	—	—	99		Fletch (soundtrack)
1986	"Waiting to See You"	—	—	—	—	—	—	—	—	—		Ruthless People (soundtrack)
1988	"The Love You Take" (with Denise Lopez)	—	—	—	—	—	—	—	—	—		Scrooged (soundtrack)
1994	"The Love in Your Eyes"	—	—	—	—	—	53	—	—	—		Keep the Fire Burnin'
1995	"Keep the Fire Burnin'" (with Loleatta Holloway)	—	—	—	—	—	—	—	—	49		Keep the Fire Burnin'
"—" denotes the single failed to chart

=== Edgar Winter Group ===
- 1972: They Only Come Out at Night – Bass, rhythm guitar, ukulele, percussion, maracas, lead vocals on "Free Ride", backing vocals
- 1974: Shock Treatment – Bass guitar, rhythm guitar, percussion, autoharp, vocals
- 1975: The Edgar Winter Group With Rick Derringer – Bass guitar, rhythm guitar, percussions, backing vocals

=== Johnny Winter ===
- 1974: Saints & Sinners – Bass, guitar, backing vocals
- 1976: Together – Piano
- 1980: Raisin' Cain – Piano

=== Rick Derringer ===
- 1975: Spring Fever – Backing Vocals on 4 songs

=== Nona Hendryx ===
- 1987: Female Trouble – Guitar, keyboards, backing vocals on 5 songs + production

=== The Legends ===
- 2001: The Early Years – Compilation
- 2001: High Towers [1965-1973] – Compilation

=== Collaborations ===
- 1975: Todd Rundgren: Initiation – Bass on "Fair Warning" with Rick Derringer on guitar, Moogy Klingman on keyboards and Edgar Winter on sax
- 1976: Foghat; Nightshift – Production
- 1977: Edgar Winter's White Trash – Recycled – Guitar on "Puttin' It Back"
- 1977: 38 Special – Thirty Eight Special - Piano on "Fly Away"
- 1979: David Johansen: InStyle – Bass, backing vocals
- 1980: Hilly Michaels: Calling All Girls – Bass, rhythm guitar, autoharp, keyboards, backing vocals
- 1980: Loleatta Holloway: Love Sensation – Bass, keyboards, percussion, backing vocals
- 1981: Hilly Michaels: Lumia – Keyboards, guitar, backing vocals. Rick Derringer is also on this album.
- 1982: Average White Band: Cupid's in Fashion – Piano, backing vocals
- 1983: Ian Hunter: All of the Good Ones Are Taken – Bass on "Speechless"
- 1984: John Jarret's Tribe: Tribe – Chorus
- 1984: Neil Sedaka: Come See About Me – Clavinet, electric piano, rhythm guitar, backing vocals, producer
- 1984: Various Artists: Streets of Fire - Music from the Original Motion Picture Soundtrack – Dan Hartman: "I Can Dream About You"
- 1985: Various Artists: Rocky IV – James Brown "Living in America" Dan Hartman production
- 1986: James Brown: Gravity – Rhythm guitar, bass, keyboards, synthesizer, programming, backing vocals
- 1986: Steve Winwood: Back in the High Life – Backing vocals on one song
- 1990: Dusty Springfield: Reputation – Various instruments, backing vocals
- 1991: Bonnie Tyler: Bitterblue – Vocals on "Till the End of Time"

== See also ==
- List of acts who appeared on American Bandstand
- List of artists who reached number one on the U.S. Dance Club Songs chart
- List of Billboard number-one dance club songs
- List of blue-eyed soul artists
- List of disco artists (A–E)
- List of HIV-positive people
- List of number-one singles in Australia during the 1980s
- List of people from Pennsylvania
- Music of Pennsylvania
