= Get Outta Town =

- UK cover of "Get Outta Town"

Single by Dan Hartman

from the album Fletch (soundtrack)
- Released: May 1985 (American release); November 1985 (UK release)
- Genre: Pop
- Length: 4:11
- Label: MCA Records
- Songwriters: Dan Hartman; Charlie Midnight
- Producers: Dan Hartman; Richard Landis

Dan Hartman singles chronology
"Second Nature" (1985)	"Get Outta Town" (1985)	"Waiting to See You" (1986)

"Get Outta Town" (also known as "Fletch, Get Outta Town") is a song by American singer-songwriter and musician Dan Hartman, which was released in 1985 as a single from the soundtrack to the film Fletch. "Get Outta Town" was written by Hartman and Charlie Midnight, and produced by Hartman and Richard Landis.

"Get Outta Town" reached No. 99 in the UK Singles Chart in November 1985.

== Music video ==
The song's music video was directed by Marty Callner. The video was shot in London and features Hartman (as a fortune teller) and Chevy Chase (as his film character Fletch). The video also shows footage from the Fletch film through a crystal ball. The video achieved light rotation on MTV.

Speaking of the video to The Billings Gazette in 1985, Hartman commented, "I play a wizard foretelling the future. I tell Chevy his future and tell him to get out of town. Chevy's a real pro to work with."

== Critical reception ==
Upon its release, Cash Box described "Get Outta Town" as "a techno dancer with plenty of rhythm" and "slick and rough with a spanking hook". They felt the song was suited for rock and contemporary hit radio, with club potential. Jerry Smith of Music Week wrote, "The fact that this is the main featured song from the hit movie Fletch should mean that this should do just as well despite being a repetitive, rather lacklustre funk number." Tom Hibbert of Smash Hits commented, "Dan Hartman doesn't make very good records, does he?"

== Track listing ==
7-inch single

1. "Get Outta Town" – 4:11
2. "Get Outta Town" (Instrumental) – 4:11

7-inch single (UK release)

1. "Get Outta Town" – 4:12
2. "I Can Dream About You" (M&M edit) – 4:05

12-inch single

1. "Get Outta Town" (Extended dance mix) – 5:34
2. "Get Outta Town" (7" version) – 3:42
3. "Get Outta Town" (Dub version) – 4:24

12-inch single (UK release)

1. "Get Outta Town" (Extended mix) – 5:34
2. "Get Outta Town" (Extended dub) – 4:24
3. "I Can Dream About You" (M&M extended mix) – 7:30
4. "I Can Dream About You" (M&M dub) – 5:10

== Personnel ==
Production

- Dan Hartman – producer on "Get Outta Town" and "I Can Dream About You"
- Richard Landis – producer on "Get Outta Town"
- Jimmy Iovine – producer on "I Can Dream About You"
- Chris Lord-Alge – remixer on "Extended (Dance) Mix" and "Dub Mix" of "Get Outta Town"
- John Morales (for M&M Productions) – remixer on "M&M Edit", "M&M Extended Mix" and "M&M Dub" of "I Can Dream About You"
- Graham Dickson – remix engineer on "M&M Edit", "M&M Extended Mix" and "M&M Dub" of "I Can Dream About You"
- Luis Jardim – additional production on "M&M Edit", "M&M Extended Mix" and "M&M Dub" of "I Can Dream About You"

== Charts ==
Chart (1985)	Peak position
UK Singles (OCC)	99
