= Turtle Power! =

1990 single by Partners in Kryme

Single by Partners in Kryme

from the album Teenage Mutant Ninja Turtles: The Original Motion Picture Soundtrack
- B-side: "Splinter's Tale" (by John Du Prez)
- Released: April 13, 1990
- Genre: Hip hop
- Length: 3:54
- Label: SBK
- Songwriters: James Alpern; Richard Usher
- Producers: Partners in Kryme, Shane Faber (single edit/album version); Partners in Kryme (film mix)

Partners in Kryme singles chronology
"Turtle Power!" (1990)	"Undercover" (1990)

"Turtle Power!" (or simply "Turtle Power") is a song by American hip hop duo Partners in Kryme. The song was released by SBK Records from the Teenage Mutant Ninja Turtles soundtrack. An early unfinished version without Shane Faber's production plays over the film's closing credits. In the United Kingdom, the film mix heard over the end credits uses the word "hero" instead of "ninja", even though the film was not retitled in the UK, unlike the 1987 cartoon series (which was titled Teenage Mutant Hero Turtles).

"Turtle Power" was released in April 1990 and reached number one on the UK Singles Chart for four weeks, making it the first hip hop single to reach number one in the UK and becoming the 13th-highest-selling single of the year in the United Kingdom. Additionally, the song peaked at number 13 on the US Billboard Hot 100, number four in Ireland, and number seven in New Zealand.

== Song information ==
Written by James Alpern and Richard Usher and produced by Partners in Kryme, "Turtle Power!" rode the wave of popularity of the Teenage Mutant Ninja Turtles franchise. A rap record featuring the use of vocoder vocals for the chorus, it became a worldwide hit, reaching number 13 on the US Billboard Hot 100, number seven in New Zealand, and number one on the UK Singles Chart for four weeks in July and August 1990. The song was also coupled with the single "Turtle Rhapsody" and included in the third Ninja Turtles film soundtrack.

== Track listings ==
7-inch and cassette single

1. "Turtle Power" – 3:50
2. "Splinter's Tale 1 & Splinter's Tale 2" (performed by John Du Prez) – 5:23

12-inch and German maxi-CD single

1. "Turtle Power" (single edit) – 3:50
2. "Turtle Power" (album version) – 4:17
3. "Splinter's Tale 1 & Splinter's Tale 2" (performed by John Du Prez) – 5:23

== Charts ==
=== Weekly charts ===
Chart (1990)	Peak position
Australia (ARIA)	15
Canada Retail Singles (The Record)	6
Canada Top Singles (RPM)	57
Europe (Eurochart Hot 100)	2
Finland (Suomen virallinen lista)	13
Germany (GfK)	12
Ireland (IRMA)	4
Netherlands (Single Top 100)	40
New Zealand (Recorded Music NZ)	7
Sweden (Sverigetopplistan)	19
Switzerland (Schweizer Hitparade)	14
UK Singles (Official Charts)	1
US Billboard Hot 100	13
US Hot Rap Singles (Billboard)	2

=== Year-end charts ===
Chart (1990)	Position
Australia (ARIA)	72
Europe (Eurochart Hot 100)	43
Germany (Media Control)	77
Sweden (Topplistan)	92
UK Singles (OCC)	13

== Certifications ==
Region	Certification	Certified units/sales
United Kingdom (BPI)	Silver	200,000^{^}
United States (RIAA)	Gold	500,000^{^}
^{^} Shipments figures based on certification alone.

== Release history ==
Region	Date	Format(s)	Label(s)	Ref.
United States	April 13, 1990	7-inch vinyl; 12-inch vinyl; cassette	SBK	
United Kingdom	July 9, 1990	7-inch vinyl; 12-inch vinyl; cassette	SBK	
United Kingdom	July 16, 1990	7-inch picture disc	SBK	
Australia	July 23, 1990	7-inch vinyl; 12-inch vinyl; cassette	SBK	
