= Ruthless People =

1986 film by Jim Abrahams, David Zucker and Jerry Zucker

- Theatrical release poster
- Directed by: Jim Abrahams; David Zucker; Jerry Zucker
- Written by: Dale Launer
- Produced by: Michael Peyser
- Starring: Danny DeVito; Judge Reinhold; Helen Slater; Bette Midler
- Cinematography: Jan de Bont
- Edited by: Gib Jaffe; Arthur Schmidt
- Music by: Michel Colombier; Charlie Midnight
- Production companies: Touchstone Films; Silver Screen Partners II
- Distributed by: Buena Vista Distribution
- Release date: June 27, 1986
- Running time: 94 minutes
- Country: United States
- Language: English
- Budget: $9-13 million
- Box office: $71.6 million

Ruthless People is a 1986 American black comedy film directed by David Zucker, Jim Abrahams, and Jerry Zucker and written by Dale Launer. It stars Danny DeVito, Bette Midler, Judge Reinhold, Anita Morris, and Helen Slater, with Bill Pullman in a supporting role in his film debut. The film is the story of a couple who kidnap their ex-boss's wife to get revenge and extort money from him. They soon realize he does not want her back and was planning to kill her himself. Meanwhile, the boss's mistress plans a blackmail attempt on him, which also fails to go as planned.

The film was a critical and commercial success. This was the last film released under the Touchstone Films label before Walt Disney Studios changed the label to Touchstone Pictures, as well as the last film directed by the Zucker, Abrahams, and Zucker trio together.

== Plot ==
Beverly Hills fashion tycoon Sam Stone despises his wife, Barbara, having married her for her family wealth, and plans to murder her so he can inherit her $15 million (Note: Barbara Stone's family wealth of $15 million is equivalent to $44.1 million in 2025.) fortune and retire with his mistress Carol. He returns home armed with chloroform but finds Barbara is missing and receives a call from her abductor, demanding $500,000 for her return and threatening to kill her if the police or media are involved. Hoping to get Barbara killed, a delighted Sam deliberately ignores the demands.

The abductors, Ken and Sandy Kessler, are a working class couple targeting Sam because he built his business using the Kesslers' life savings and fashion designs he stole from Sandy. They imprison Barbara in their basement, but she proves difficult to control, and Sandy feels guilty about their actions. Intending to financially blackmail Sam, Carol sends her lover Earl to film Sam at the cliff from which he intended to dispose of Barbara, but, unaware of Sam's appearance, Earl unwittingly films a man having sex with a prostitute, mistaking her screams for Barbara dying. Without watching the tape, Carol forwards a copy to Sam, who assumes it is a seductive birthday present, and she interprets his lewd response as a threat, causing her and Earl to go into hiding.

Bored and overweight, Barbara begins following television exercise programs. She is eventually overjoyed to realize she has lost 20 pounds (9 kg) and bonds with Sandy after being impressed by her fashion ideas and dress designs, which she can now fit into. Meanwhile, Ken repeatedly drops the ransom price, eventually reaching $10,000, but Sam refuses to pay and encourages Ken to kill Barbara. Although Ken is confronted as a suspect because of tire tracks at the Stone residence, the investigation is redirected when Carol, hoping to incriminate Sam, sends another copy of the tape to police chief Henry Benton, unaware he is the man on the tape. Assuming he is being blackmailed, Benton has Sam investigated and arrested following the discovery of the chloroform and photos of him with Carol.

Realizing he is incapable of being a ruthless criminal, Ken returns home to collect Sandy and flee to Mexico. He learns that Sandy has released Barbara, and they want to work together to develop and sell Sandy's fashion designs. The Bedroom Killer, a notorious local serial killer, invades their home and confronts them and Barbara as she returns, leading to an accident in which he dies after falling down the basement stairs. Realizing that Sam wanted her dead and having learned of his affair, Barbara collaborates with Ken and Sandy to take revenge by stealing his entire personal fortune worth over $2.2 million. (Note: Sam Stone's personal wealth of $2 million is equivalent to $6.46 million in 2025.) After being bailed out of jail, Sam reluctantly collects the ransom in a briefcase, desperate to prove his innocence in Barbara's disappearance. Carol finally views the tape and, realizing Earl's mistake, reconnects with Sam to learn when the ransom handover will take place and that the police, now distrustful of Sam, will not accompany him.

Earl ambushes Sam and a masked Ken at the exchange, but they are surrounded by scores of SWAT officers, and Earl is arrested. Ken warns the cops that Barbara will be killed if they try to stop him, and drives off followed by a police convoy. Cornered, he drives off the end of the Santa Monica Pier and seemingly drowns. The police recover the body of the Bedroom Killer, disguised as Ken, from the car but are unable to locate the ransom money. Despite his loss, Sam is elated that Barbara must be dead until she arrives on the pier, identifies the Killer as her abductor, and kicks Sam into the water. Elsewhere, Ken emerges from the ocean in scuba gear, carrying the briefcase, and celebrates with the waiting Sandy and Barbara.

== Cast ==
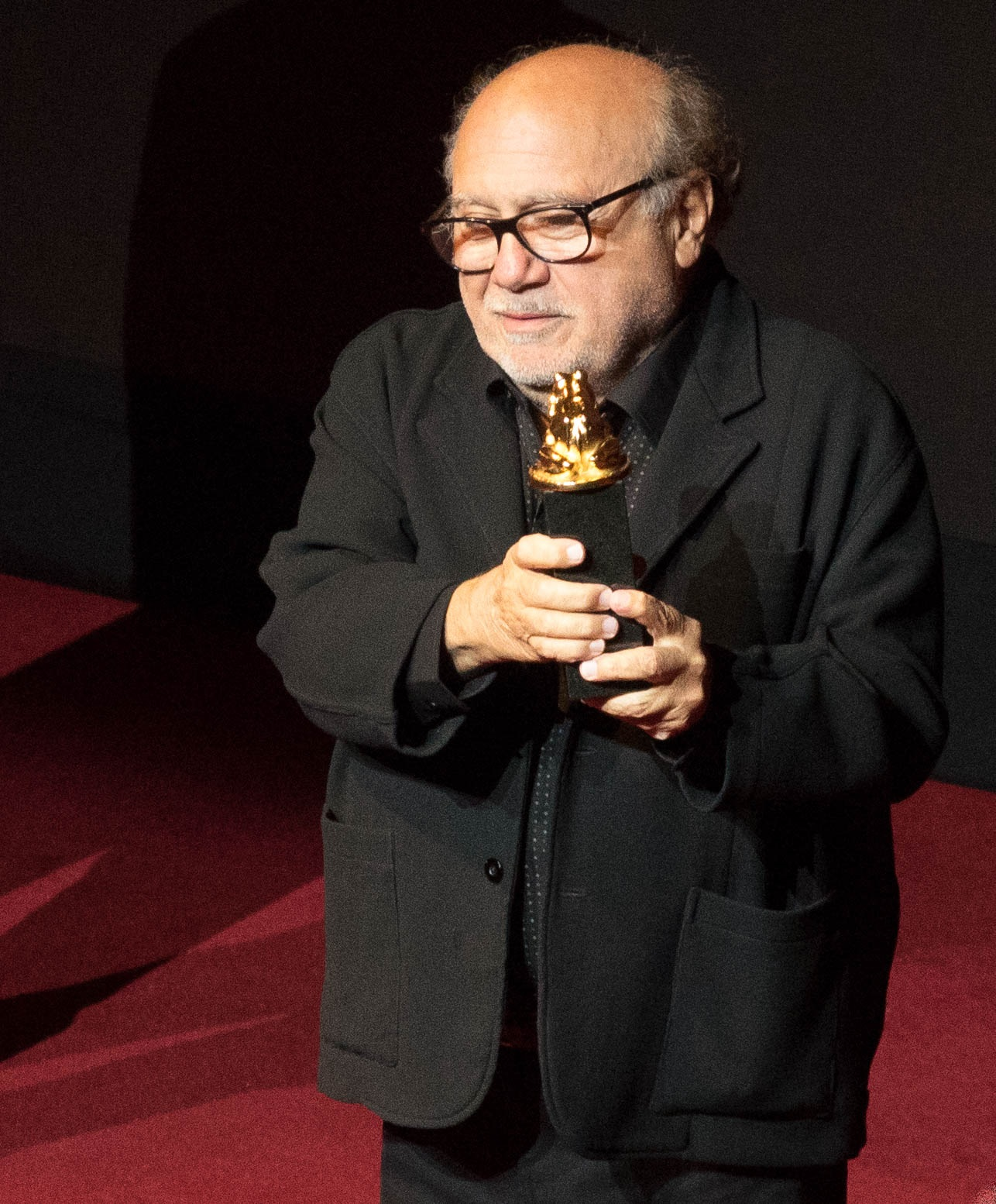
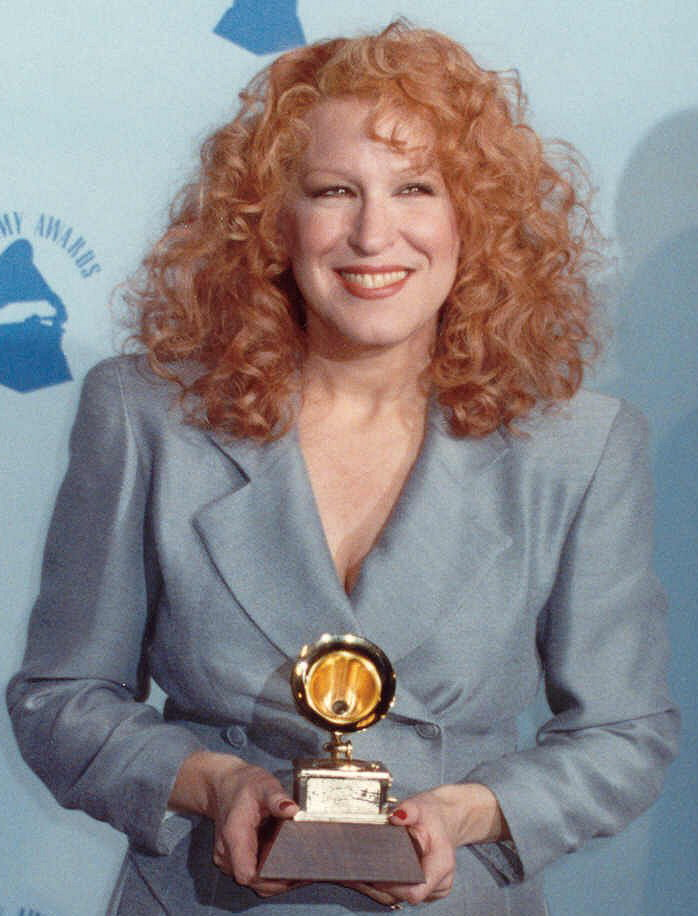
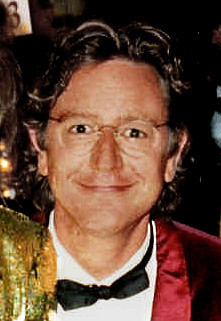
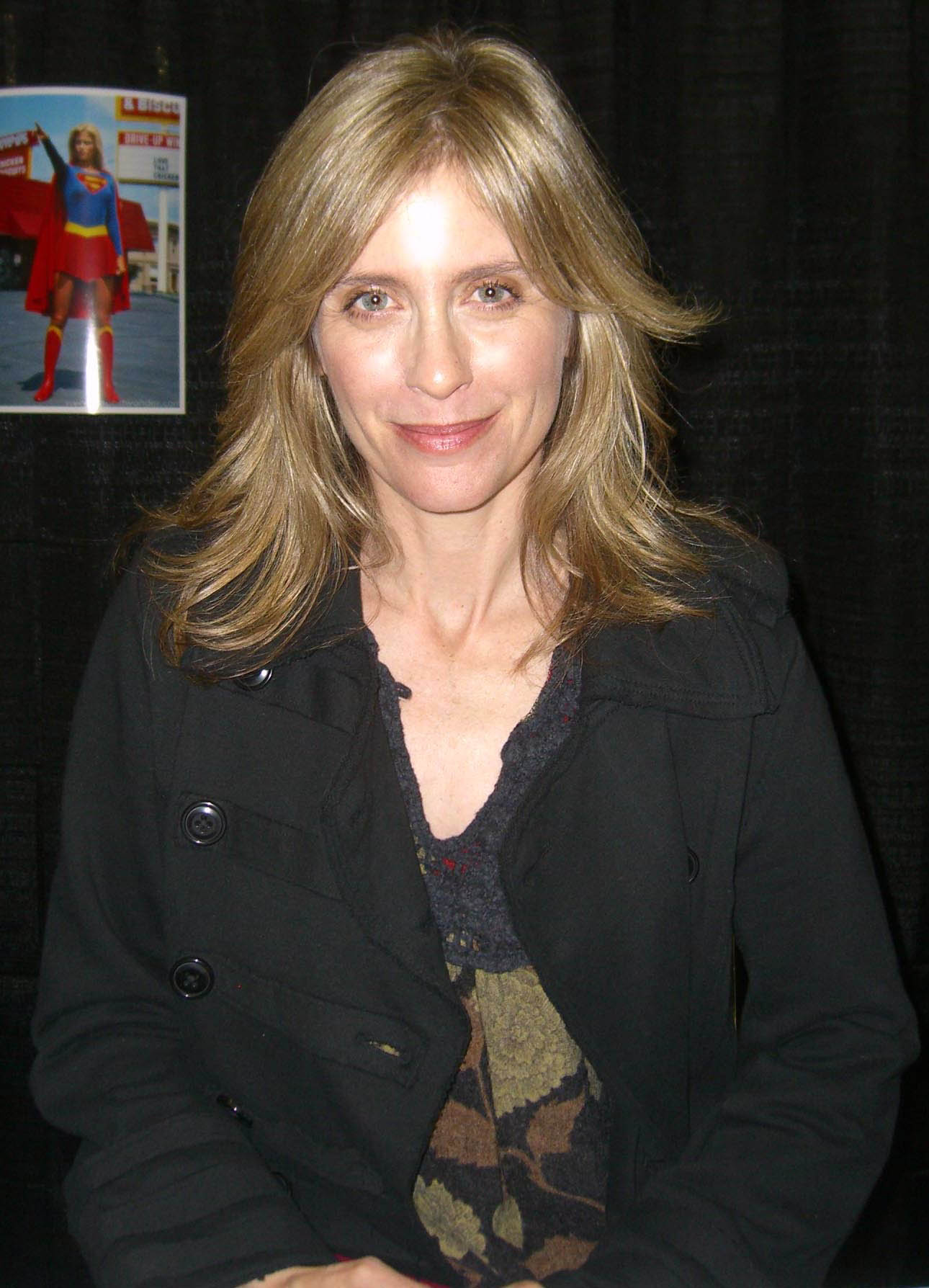
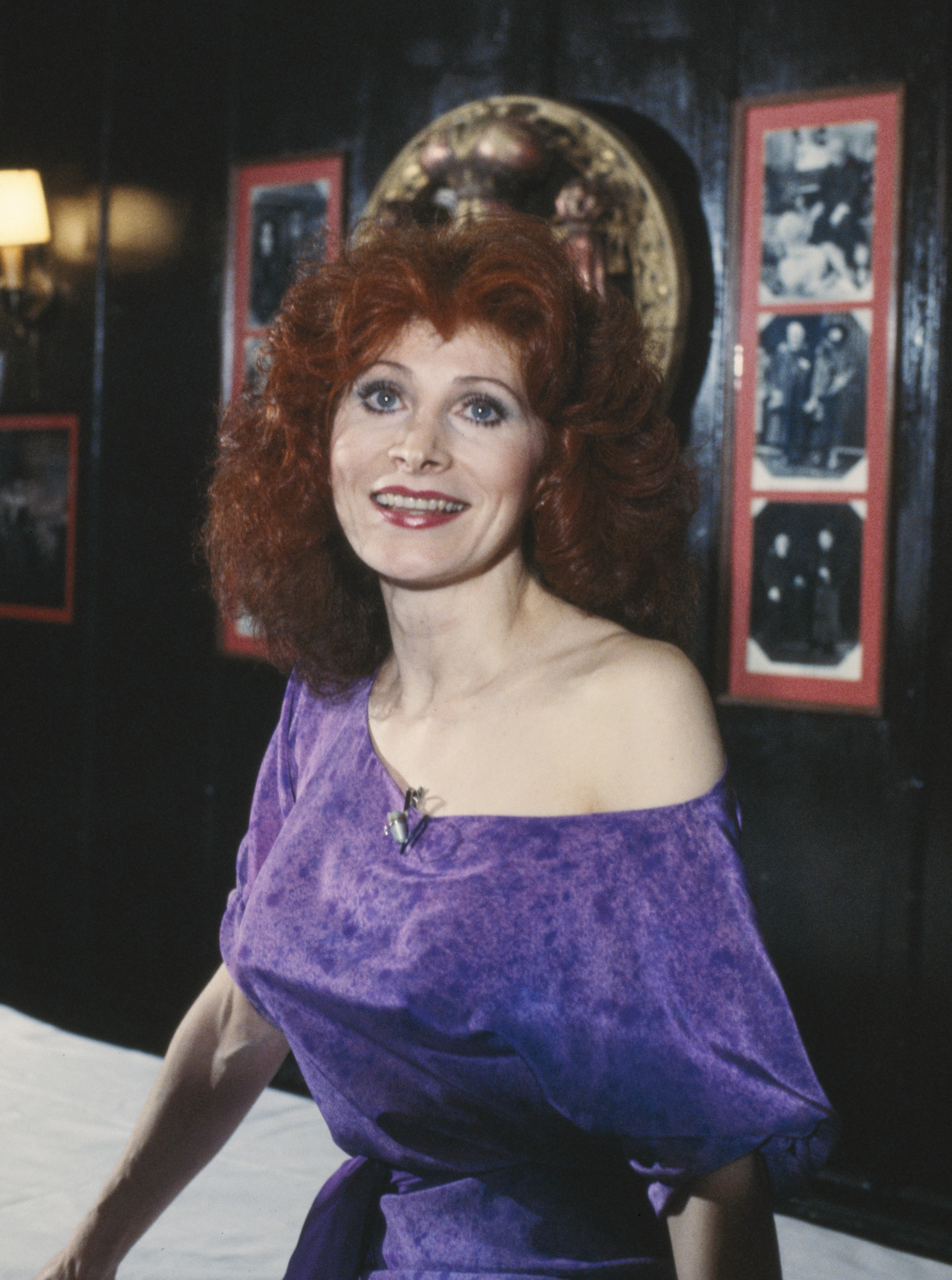
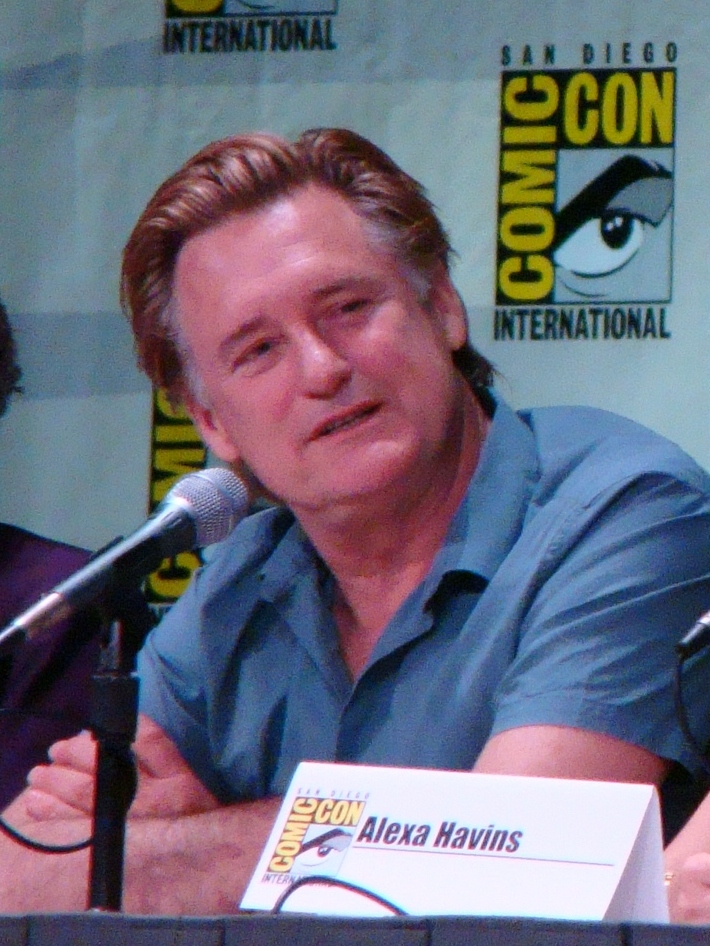
Top to bottom, left to right: Danny DeVito (pictured in 2022), Bette Midler (2022), Judge Reinhold (1994), Helen Slater (2009), Anita Morris (1982), and Bill Pullman (2011)
- Danny DeVito as Sam Stone
- Bette Midler as Barbara Stone
- Judge Reinhold as Ken Kessler
- Helen Slater as Sandy Kessler
- Anita Morris as Carol Dodsworth
- Bill Pullman as Earl Mott
- William G. Schilling as police chief Henry Benton
- Art Evans as Lt. Bender
- Clarence Felder as Lt. Walters
- J. E. Freeman as Bedroom Killer
- Gary Riley as Heavy Metal Kid
- Phyllis Applegate as Loan officer

== Production ==
The set design for the majority of the interiors of the home of Sam and Barbara Stone extensively employs the Italian radical design furniture and lighting from the Memphis Group.

The directors normally wrote all their own material. However, they were contacted by Michael Eisner, who became head of Disney after working with the trio at Paramount. According to David Zucker, Eisner "said he had a script that we wouldn't be able to turn down and he was right. It was too good. It was very well written with great characters. And hey we wouldn't have to leave town to do it."

While directing, Jerry Zucker would be on set talking to the actors while the other two would watch from monitors and give comments.

The trio found the making of the film difficult due to them having to direct a script none of them had written as well as the film's style being different from their previous work. It also contributed to their eventual split in the 1990s, with Jerry Zucker stating: “It became evident that if we were going to do (scripts written by other people), we’d have to direct separately.”

== Reception ==
"This film takes a good, simple idea — the kidnapping of a nagging wife whose husband doesn't want her back — and adds some charismatic casting: Danny DeVito and Bette Midler. One of the delights of the movie is that its script dares to complicate what could have been a much more straightforward yarn. Danny DeVito's character of Sam Stone, a vulgar, wealthy, Bel Air dress manufacturer, is a hard-nosed classic, admitting in the film's opening sequence that he married his wife because she was very, very rich and her wealthy father was very, very sick. Ruthless People contains some of the biggest laughs of 1986."

— Gene Siskel, Chicago Tribune

The film was a financial success, grossing $71.6 million compared to the relatively frugal budget of the film's production. It was Disney's highest-grossing film (excluding reissues). On review aggregator Rotten Tomatoes, the film holds an approval rating of 93% based on 43 reviews, with an average score of 7.1/10. The website's critical consensus reads: "It's sometimes crude and tasteless, but Ruthless People wrings acid-soaked laughs out of its dark premise and gleefully misanthropic characters." On Metacritic, the film received a score of 78 based on 15 reviews. Audiences polled by CinemaScore gave the film an average grade of "A−" on an A+ to F scale.

Roger Ebert said that the film "is made out of good performances, a script of diabolical ingenuity, and a whole lot of silliness." Leonard Maltin agreed that this "clever farce" has "lots of laughs, bright performances, but turns sour: these really are unpleasant people!"

Although it has been argued that Ruthless People was influenced by O. Henry's story "The Ransom of Red Chief", writer Dale Launer claims that it was inspired by the kidnapping of Patricia Hearst and that the similarities between the film and the earlier story were a coincidence.

The Telugu film Money is loosely based on this film.

== Soundtrack ==
Ruthless People

Soundtrack album by Various artists
- Released: 1986
- Recorded: 1986
- Genre: Soundtrack
- Label: Epic

The album's soundtrack was released on Epic Records. The track, "Waiting to See You" by Dan Hartman, is missing the first several drum bars on the CD release contained on the vinyl and cassette releases. The soundtrack version of "Ruthless People" is similar to the version heard in the film, including both an extended intro and a second verse edited out of the single version. Weird Al Yankovic parodied this song on his 1986 album Polka Party as "Toothless People."

=== Track listing ===
No.	Title	Writer(s)	Length
1.	"Ruthless People" (Mick Jagger)	Daryl Hall, Jagger, David A. Stewart	4:32
2.	"Give Me the Reason" (Luther Vandross)	Vandross	4:46
3.	"Modern Woman" (Billy Joel)	Joel	3:48
4.	"Wherever I Lay My Hat (That's My Home)" (Paul Young)	Marvin Gaye, Norman Whitfield, Barrett Strong	5:18
5.	"No Say in It" (Machinations)	Machinations	3:19
6.	"Waiting to See You" (Dan Hartman)	Charlie Midnight, Hartman	4:10
7.	"Dance Champion" (Kool & the Gang)	Robert Kool Bell, J.T. Taylor, Kool & the Gang	3:02
8.	"Neighborhood Watch" (Michel Colombier)	Colombier	3:48
9.	"Stand on It" (Bruce Springsteen)	Springsteen	2:31
10.	"Don't You Want My Love" (Nicole McCloud)	Aldo Nova	3:41

=== Charts ===
Chart (1986)	Peak position
Australia (Kent Music Report)	78
US Top Pop Albums (Billboard)	20

== See also ==
- Too Many Crooks
