= I Can Dream About You (album) =

Studio album by Dan Hartman
- Released: May 3, 1984
- Recorded: 1983–1984
- Genre: Pop, pop rock, new wave
- Length: 43:15
- Label: MCA
- Producer: Dan Hartman; Jimmy Iovine

Dan Hartman chronology
It Hurts to Be in Love (1981)	I Can Dream About You (1984)	White Boy (1986)

Singles from I Can Dream About You
- 1. "I Can Dream About You" Released: April 1984; 2. "We Are the Young" Released: September 6, 1984; 3. "Second Nature" Released: January 1985

I Can Dream About You is the fifth studio album from American musician/singer/songwriter Dan Hartman, released on May 3, 1984, by MCA. The album was produced by Hartman and Jimmy Iovine.

I Can Dream About You was Hartman's debut album for MCA Records and marked the first album to feature Hartman's longtime songwriting partner Charlie Midnight, with whom he would continue to write throughout the rest of the decade. Hartman and Midnight wrote eight out of the ten tracks together, with the title track being written solely by Hartman, and the album's closing track, "Electricity", being written by Hartman and Nona Hendryx. Hendryx's own version of the song was included on her own 1984 album The Art of Defense. Owing to MCA not releasing the follow-up album White Boy, I Can Dream About You was Hartman's final album in his lifetime to feature vocals and lyrics, as his following album, New Green Clear Blue, would consist entirely of instrumental tracks.

== Background ==
Following the success of Hartman's two disco-oriented albums Instant Replay and Relight My Fire, from 1978 and 1979 respectively, Hartman decided to move into a more melodic pop-rock sound with his 1981 album It Hurts to Be in Love. However, the album was not a commercial success, and its three singles only became minor chart hits.

In 1983, Iovine contacted Hartman with the request of writing a song for a film he was working on. Hartman was told the song would be sung by four black guys in a concert situation within the film, and he ended up thinking of a demo he had made of "I Can Dream About You". Hartman then went through some legal maneuvering to get the benefit of his breakthrough. The use of the song in the film being performed by actors did not feature Hartman on vocals but studio singer Winston Ford. After some contract negotiating, Hartman insisted he sing the song on the soundtrack, and that his version be released if a single were to be issued from the soundtrack album. Additionally, any music video had to feature his own voice using the song. These clauses helped Hartman become an "overnight sensation".

Both Hartman and Iovine worked on the solo album following the song's use in the film. It was recorded at Hartman's own home studio "Multi-Level" and was mixed at Image Recording in Los Angeles. Speaking to the Orange Coast in 1985, Hartman stated: "It's been 10 years since my last tour, and I'm really enjoying being back out there. Musically I've stayed in touch with what's going on, what people relate to, so it's no surprise appearing in front of an audience in 1985. What is a surprise is that they relate to me. They're giving back so much, which means they're responding to my music. And that makes me feel great."

I Can Dream About You peaked at No. 55 on the Billboard 200. It also reached No. 91 in Canada. The album spawned four singles in total. The title track became Hartman's biggest hit, also appearing on the soundtrack to the 1984 film Streets of Fire. The song peaked at No. 6 on the Billboard Hot 100. "We Are the Young" followed as the second single and reached No. 25 on the Billboard Hot 100, while also topping the Billboard Dance Music/Club Play Singles Chart. "Name of the Game" was issued as a single, but was not a commercial success. "Second Nature" became the fourth and final single, where it peaked at No. 39 on the Billboard Hot 100, and would prove to be Hartman's last appearance on the chart.

I Can Dream About You was Hartman's final mainstream studio album, although he did record a follow-up in 1986 titled White Boy. However, MCA felt the songs did not suit Hartman's image and so the album was shelved, although it has been in circulation unofficially in recent years online. Hartman's final studio album, New Green Clear Blue, was released in 1989, and was an instrumental new age-styled release.

Recalling his memories of the album for Hartman's unofficial fan site, Midnight commented:

"Working with Dan on the album was a privilege and a great learning experience. He wanted to create a work that had depth as well as accessibility. We wrote many more songs than finally appeared on the album. Dan took some risks on quite a few of those songs that, because of the edginess of the music and lyrics, were ultimately rejected by the record company. He involved me in all phases of the production and because of that experience I was able to make the transition into record production. In essence, I went to school during making of the album."

In 1991, Marc Anthony covered the song "Name of the Game" on his collaboration album with Little Louie Vega entitled When the Night Is Over.

=== Cover ===
The album cover features photography by Jim Shea. Hartman is seen walking in the forefront with Midnight (who is sitting on the steps) and the band members assembled in the background.

== Promotion ==
Music videos were filmed to promote "I Can Dream About You," "We Are the Young" and "Second Nature". Hartman also performed the songs on varying TV shows in America and Europe. A tour was also organized to promote the album, with Hartman touring alongside Toto. It was his first tour in a decade and also his last.

== Critical reception ==
Professional ratings
Review scores
Source	Rating
AllMusic	4/5 stars

Upon release, Billboard picked I Can Dream About You as a recommended album and said: "Dan Hartman's AOR fans should start with side one of "I Can Dream About You", while his dance cult should flip to side two immediately. There are three great uptempo numbers: the uplifting electronic production number "Name of the Game," a bouncy neo-Motown "Second Nature" (of a pair with "Wake Me Up Before You Go-Go"), and the electro-funk "Electricity," joined by Nona Hendryx." Later in the year, Billboard added that the album had "the same broad-based pop/rock appeal" as the title track.

Alex Henderson of AllMusic retrospectively described the album as one of Hartman's "most essential solo albums". He added: "This is primarily a pop/rock album, but it's a pop/rock album with a fair amount of urban contemporary/dance-pop appeal. Though Hartman was a member of a major '70s rock act, the Edgar Winter Group, he also had strong R&B and disco credentials. Hartman, Midnight, and Iovine all do their part to make I Can Dream About You the focused, consistently rewarding album that it is."

== Track listing ==
All songs written by Dan Hartman and Charlie Midnight, except where noted.

No.	Title	Writer(s)	Length
1.	"We Are the Young"		4:20
2.	"I Can Dream About You"	Hartman	4:11
3.	"Shy Hearts"		4:39
4.	"I'm Not a Rolling Stone"		4:32
5.	"Rage to Live"		3:56
6.	"Name of the Game"		5:59
7.	"Power of a Good Love"		4:09
8.	"Second Nature"		3:57
9.	"I Can't Get Enough"		3:27
10.	"Electricity"	Hartman, Nona Hendryx	4:04

== Personnel ==
- Dan Hartman – lead vocals, backing vocals, all instruments (except as noted below)
- Bill Payne – acoustic piano (2)
- Richie Zito – additional guitars (2)
- Michael Thompson – additional guitars (5)
- Eddie Watkins – bass (2)
- Art Wood – additional drums (2), additional snare drums (5)
- Bobbye Hall – percussion (2)
- Nona Hendryx – Oberheim DMX drum programming (10)
- Arno Hecht – tenor saxophone solo (4), tenor saxophone (8)
- Crispin Cioe – baritone saxophone (8)
- Ernie Watts – tenor saxophone solo (8)
- "Hollywood" Paul Litteral – trumpet (8)
- Joe Pizzulo – backing vocals (2)
- Winston Ford – backing vocals (2)
- Ellen Foley – backing group vocals (4, 9)
- Frank Simms – backing group vocals (4, 6, 8, 9)
- George Simms – backing group vocals (4, 6, 8)
- Charlie Midnight – backing group vocals (8)

Production

- Producers – Dan Hartman and Jimmy Iovine
- Engineer – Dan Hartman
- Assistant Engineers – Shelly Yakus (all tracks); Gabe Veltri (Track 2).
- Recorded at Multi-Level (Westport, CT).
- Mixing – Juergen Koppers (Tracks 1, 4 & 5) Humberto Gatica (Track 2); Shelly Yakus (Tracks 3, 8 & 9); Dan Hartman (Tracks 6, 7 & 10).
- Mix Assistants – Steve Krause (all tracks); Shelly Yakus (Track 5).
- Mixed at Image Recording Studios (Los Angeles, CA).
- Mastered by Stephen Marcussen at Precision Lacquer (Los Angeles, CA).
- Art Direction – Vartan Kirjian
- Photography – Jim Shea

== Charts ==
Chart (1984)	Peak position
Canadian Albums Chart	91
U.S. Billboard 200 Chart	55
