= Second Nature (Dan Hartman song) =

Single by Dan Hartman

from the album I Can Dream About You
- Released: January 1985 (America); April 1985 (Europe); 25 April 1985 (Japan)
- Genre: Pop
- Length: 3:57
- Label: MCA Records
- Songwriters: Dan Hartman, Charlie Midnight
- Producers: Dan Hartman, Jimmy Iovine

Dan Hartman singles chronology
| "Name of the Game" (1984) | "Second Nature" (1985) | "Get Outta Town" (1985) |

"Second Nature" is a song by American singer-songwriter Dan Hartman, released in 1985 as the fourth and final single from his fifth studio album I Can Dream About You (1984). The song was written by Hartman and Charlie Midnight, and produced by Hartman and Jimmy Iovine. "Second Nature" reached No. 39 on the Billboard Hot 100 and remained in the charts for 12 weeks.

== Background ==
I Can Dream About You was Hartman's only album for the MCA Records label and the first to feature Hartman's collaborations with songwriting partner Charlie Midnight. Like the rest of the album, "Second Nature" was recorded at Hartman's own home studio "Multi-Level" and was mixed at Image Recording in Los Angeles.

In the UK, "Second Nature" peaked at No. 66. The song gained some minor success in clubs and brought back echoes from the days of Hartman's 1978 hit "Instant Replay", which had been a Top 10 hit in the country.

In a 1984 interview with Hartman, he described "Second Nature" as "a good old love song". He added: "It's a song about being elated, excited and in love, and how every day of life is made easy."

== Release ==
"Second Nature" was released by MCA Records in North America, Europe and Japan, on 7" and 12" vinyl formats. The B-side, "I Can't Get Enough", was taken from I Can Dream About You. The 12" vinyl single was released with an extended version of "Second Nature", as well as a dub version of the track. Both of these remixes were created by John Luongo.

== Promotion ==
A music video was filmed to promote the single. The video features a truck of watermelons crashing, with the incident causing people from varying backgrounds and ages rushing to the scene. Hartman, who is originally seen playing guitar from a window in an apartment block, brings his portable radio down to the scene and begins performing the song. The rest of the crowd eventually begin to dance, as more people come to the scene. The video was shot in Los Angeles and features the Pierce High School Marching Band and the Jefferson High School football team among other people (Hartman's close friend Glenn Ellison and co-songwriter Charlie Midnight make appearances playing the parts of paramedics). Writing in The Dispatch in 1985, E.A. Vare described the video as possibly containing "the largest and strangest cast ever assembled for a rock clip".

Hartman performed "Second Nature" on a number of American TV shows, including American Bandstand in December 1984, with his touring band. In 1985 he mimed the song with his touring band on the American syndicated music show Solid Gold. On the musical variety show Soul Train he performed both "I Can Dream About You" and "Second Nature" minus his band, but with live vocal. This song was performed as a short version, and aired on May 10, 1985. In the UK, Hartman performed the song on the UK ITV children's TV programme Razzamatazz.

== Critical reception ==
In a review of I Can Dream About You, Brian Chin of Billboard described "Second Nature" as "bouncy neo-Motown" and a "great uptempo number". In a review of the song as a single, Chin described "Second Nature" as "one of [Hartman's] very best songs, with a genuine gospel feel", but felt the extended version was "a bit stretched out".

== Track listing ==
7" Single

1. "Second Nature" - 3:57
2. "I Can't Get Enough" - 3:27

12" Single

1. "Second Nature" (Extended Version) - 7:14
2. "Second Nature" (Dub Version) - 6:42
3. "Second Nature" (LP Version) - 3:57

== Personnel ==
- Dan Hartman - vocals, instruments (except where noted)
- Charlie Midnight, Frank Simms, George Simms - backing vocals
- Crispin Cioe - baritone saxophone
- Ernie Watts - tenor solo saxophone
- Arno Hecht - tenor saxophone
- Paul Litteral - trumpet

Production

- Dan Hartman - producer, engineer
- Jimmy Iovine - producer
- Shelly Yakus - additional engineer, mixing
- Steve Krause - assistant engineer
- Steve Marcussen - mastering

== Charts ==
| Chart (1985) | Peak position |
|---|---|
| Canadian Adult Contemporary Chart | 19 |
| Canadian Singles Chart | 80 |
| UK Singles Chart | 66 |
| US Billboard Hot 100 | 39 |
| US Billboard Adult Contemporary | 19 |
| US Billboard Dance/Club Play Songs | 40 |
