= Unchain My Heart (album) =

Studio album by Joe Cocker
- Released: 9 October 1987
- Recorded: 1986–1987
- Studio: House of Music (West Orange, New Jersey) Santa Barbara Sound Design (Santa Barbara, California) O'Henry Sound Studios (Burbank, California) Greene Street Recording (New York City, New York) Bearsville Studios (Bearsville, New York)
- Genre: Rock, blue-eyed soul
- Length: 42:05
- Label: Capitol
- Producer: Charlie Midnight

Joe Cocker chronology
Joe Cocker Classics Volume 4 (1987)	Unchain My Heart (1987)	One Night of Sin (1989)

Professional ratings
Review scores
Source	Rating
AllMusic	2/5 stars
New Musical Express	5/10

Unchain My Heart is the eleventh studio album by English singer Joe Cocker, released in 1987.

Miller Lite used Joe Cocker's recording of "Unchain My Heart" for their Dalmatian campaign as the dog jumps from the Budweiser Clydesdale horse-drawn carriage to the Miller Lite truck.

The song "Trust in Me" was re-recorded in 1992 for the soundtrack of the movie The Bodyguard. This version was recorded as a duet with Canadian singer Sass Jordan.

== Track listing ==
1. "Unchain My Heart" (Bobby Sharp, Teddy Powell) – 5:02
2. "Two Wrongs" (Eddie Schwartz, David Bendeth) – 4:02
3. "I Stand in Wonder" (Schwartz, David Tyson) – 4:21
4. "The River's Rising" (Michael Lunn) – 4:05
5. "Isolation" (John Lennon) – 3:51
6. "All Our Tomorrows" (Schwartz, Tyson) – 4:21
7. "A Woman Loves a Man" (Dan Hartman, Charlie Midnight) – 4:14
8. "Trust in Me" (Francesca Beghe, Marc Swersky, Midnight) – 4:12
9. "The One" (Tom Kimmel, Jay Joyce) – 4:35
10. "Satisfied" (Hartman, Midnight) – 3:22

== Personnel ==
Musicians

- Joe Cocker – vocals
- Jeff Levine – keyboards (1–3, 5, 6, 8, 9), Hammond organ (4), grand piano (10)
- Robbie Kilgore – additional keyboards (3, 5, 6, 9)
- Greg Johnson – grand piano (8), organ (10)
- Phil Grande – guitars, guitar solo (6, 10)
- T. M. Stevens – bass
- David Beal – drums
- Sammy Figueroa – percussion (3, 5–8)
- Dan Hartman – additional percussion (3), tambourine (4), additional guitars (5, 6, 8, 10), keyboards (7), guitars (7)
- Clarence Clemons – tenor saxophone solo (1)
- Lawrence Feldman – saxophone (3)
- Ric Cunningham – alto saxophone (7)

The Uptown Horns – horns and horn arrangements on "Unchain My Heart"

- Crispin Cioe – saxophones
- Arno Hecht – saxophones
- Bob Funk – trombone
- "Hollywood" Paul Litteral – trumpet

Handclaps on "The River's Rising"

- Glenn Ellison
- Robbie Kilgore
- Dan Hartman
- Charlie Midnight

Background vocals

- Tawatha Agee – backing vocals (1–4, 6, 7, 9, 10)
- Benny Diggs – backing vocals (1–4, 6, 7, 9)
- Vaneese Thomas – backing vocals (1–4, 6, 7, 9)
- Dan Hartman – backing vocals (2, 4, 6, 7, 10)
- B.J. Nelson – backing vocals (2, 4, 6, 10)
- Renée Geyer – vocals (8)
- Phoebe Snow – vocals (9)
- Maxine Green – backing vocals (10)
- Jayne Ann Lang – backing vocals (10)
- Janice Singleton – backing vocals (10)

== Production ==
- Dan Hartman – executive producer
- Charlie Midnight – producer
- John Rollo – engineer
- Joel Soyffer – additional engineer
- Danny Grigsby – assistant engineer
- Thom Chadley – assistant engineer
- Mark Gaide – assistant engineer
- Dave Mendenhall – assistant engineer
- Nelson Ayers – additional assistant engineer
- Paul Higgins – additional assistant engineer
- Chris Lord-Alge – mixing at Unique Recording Studios (New York, NY)
- Steve Entebbe – mix assistant
- Matt Hathaway – mix assistant
- Bob Ludwig – mastering at Masterdisk (New York, NY)
- Roy Kohara – art direction
- Roland Young – design
- Abe Frajndilich – photography
- Michael Lang – management

== Charts ==
Chart (1987)	Peak position
Dutch Albums (Album Top 100)	14
Finnish Albums (Suomen virallinen lista)	20
German Albums (Offizielle Top 100)	2
Norwegian Albums (VG-lista)	17
Swedish Albums (Sverigetopplistan)	15
Swiss Albums (Schweizer Hitparade)	6
US Billboard 200	89

Chart (1988)	Peak position
Australian Albums (ARIA)	24
Austrian Albums (Ö3 Austria)	5
Canadian Albums (RPM)	40
French Albums (SNEP)	21
New Zealand Albums (RMNZ)	32

== Certifications ==
Region	Certification	Certified units/sales
Canada (Music Canada)	Gold	50,000^{^}
France (SNEP)	Gold	100,000^{*}
Germany (BVMI)	3× Gold	750,000^{^}
Italy (FIMI)	Gold	100,000
Spain (Promusicae)	Platinum	100,000^{^}
Switzerland (IFPI Switzerland)	Platinum	50,000^{^}
^{*} Sales figures based on certification alone.^{^} Shipments figures based on certification alone.

== Accolades ==
Company	Country	Accolade	Year	Rank
Australian Recording Industry Association (ARIA)	Australia	Top 50 Albums	1988	48
