= Spunkadelic =

Canadian Hip-Hop/R&B Group

- Origin: Canada
- Genres: Hip hop; R&B
- Past members: Alicia Whittaker; Ray Guiste

Spunkadelic were a Canadian hip-hop/R&B group best known for their songs "9.95", "Take Me Like I Am", and "Boomerang". The group consisted of singers Alicia Whittaker (listed as Ali) and Ray Guiste (listed as Ray), backed by Peter Willis on keyboards.

"Take Me Like I Am" was written by Peter "Spunk" Willis and Sterling Jarvis in 1988, but released somewhat accidentally in California radio markets in 1990 where it received airplay. The song was nominated for Best R&B/Soul Recording and Rap Recording of the Year at the 1991 Juno Awards.

"Boomerang" appeared on the Billboard charts in 1991 for eight weeks, peaking at #47. The track also appeared briefly on the RPM Top Singles chart that year, hitting #84.

The group also gained some notoriety for their song "9.95", which was included on the Teenage Mutant Ninja Turtles: The Original Motion Picture Soundtrack in 1990, and the song "Creatures of Habit" which was released on the subsequent Teenage Mutant Ninja Turtles II: The Secret of the Ooze: The Original Motion Picture Soundtrack in 1991.

In 1991 the pair released Spunk Junk. The album didn't receive much critical attention, and reviews were mixed. "Wherever U R" appeared for two weeks on the RPM Top Singles chart, peaking at #60.

== Recordings ==
=== Album ===
- Spunk Junk (1991)

=== Singles ===
- "Take Me Like I Am"
- "Boomerang"
- "Wherever U R"

=== Soundtracks ===
Year	Film	Song
1990	Teenage Mutant Ninja Turtles	"9.95"
1991	Teenage Mutant Ninja Turtles II: The Secret of the Ooze	"Creatures of Habit"
