= Gene Pitney's Big Sixteen =

Compilation album by Gene Pitney
- Released: 1964
- Recorded: 1962–1964
- Genre: Pop
- Length: 42:43
- Label: Musicor
- Producer: Aaron Schroeder, Wally Gold

Gene Pitney chronology
Gene Pitney Meets the Fair Young Ladies of Folkland (1964)	Gene Pitney's Big Sixteen (1964)	Gene Italiano (1964)

Professional ratings
Review scores
Source	Rating
allmusic.com	3/5 stars

Gene Pitney's Big Sixteen is a compilation of hits by American singer Gene Pitney, released on the Musicor label in 1964. The album contains a mix of hit singles and album cuts from Pitney's early records.

== Track listing ==
=== Side 1 ===
1. "Ship True Love Goodbye" (Mark Barkan, Neval Nader) – 2:25 (from Gene Pitney Sings Just for You)
2. "Twenty Four Hours From Tulsa" (Hal David, Burt Bacharach) – 3:00 (from Blue Gene)
3. "Only Love Can Break a Heart" (David, Bacharach) – 2:49 (from Only Love Can Break a Heart)
4. "Not Responsible" (Ben Raleigh, Barkan) – 2:31 (from Gene Pitney Sings Just for You)
5. "Teardrop by Teardrop" (Bob Halley) – 2:19 (from Gene Pitney Sings Just for You)
6. "Donna Means Heartbreak" (David, Paul Hampton) – 2:23 (from Only Love Can Break a Heart)
7. "Aladdin's Lamp" (Gene Pitney) – 2:28 (from Gene Pitney Sings Just for You)
8. "The Man Who Shot Liberty Valance" (David, Bacharach) – 2:58 (from Only Love Can Break a Heart)

=== Side 2 ===
1. "Keep Tellin' Yourself" (Ellie Greenwich, Elmo Glick, Tony Powers) – 2:23 (from Blue Gene)
2. "Mecca" (John Gluck Jr., Nader) – 2:21 (from Gene Pitney Sings Just for You)
3. "Town Without Pity" (Dimitri Tiomkin, Ned Washington) – 2:55 (from The Many Sides of Gene Pitney)
4. "Tower Tall" (Mel Mandel, Norman Sachs) – 3:21 (from Only Love Can Break a Heart)
5. "Cry Your Eyes Out" (Raleigh, J. Gluck) – 2:04 (from Only Love Can Break a Heart)
6. "True Love Never Runs Smooth" (David, Bacharach) – 2:26 (from Only Love Can Break a Heart)
7. "Take Me Tonight" (Aaron Schroeder, Roy Alfred, Wally Gold) – 2:37 (from The Many Sides of Gene Pitney)
8. "Half Heaven – Half Heartache" (Schroeder, George Goehring, Gold)– 2:43 (from Only Love Can Break a Heart)
