= Gene Pitney Sings World Wide Winners =

Compilation album by Gene Pitney
- Released: 1963
- Genre: Pop
- Length: 30:30
- Label: Musicor
- Producers: Aaron Schroeder, Wally Gold

Gene Pitney chronology
Gene Pitney Sings Just for You (1962)	Gene Pitney Sings World Wide Winners (1963)	Blue Gene (1963)

Professional ratings
Review scores
Source	Rating
allmusic.com	3/5 stars

Gene Pitney Sings World Wide Winners is American singer Gene Pitney's fourth album, released on the Musicor label in 1963. The album mainly comprised material released on Pitney's first two albums, plus two non-album single tracks: "Louisiana Mama" and "Mr. Moon, Mr. Cupid & I", and one previously unreleased track: "Garden of Love".

The album reached No. 41 on the US Billboard albums chart during a 29-week run on the chart.

== Track listing ==
All tracks composed by Gene Pitney; except where indicated

=== Side 1 ===
1. "Mr. Moon, Mr. Cupid & I" – 2:15 (Non-album B-side of the "Every Breath I Take" single)
2. "Only Love Can Break a Heart" (Hal David, Burt Bacharach) – 2:52 (from Only Love Can Break a Heart)
3. "If I Didn't Have a Dime" (Bert Russell, Phil Medley) – 2:31 (from Only Love Can Break a Heart)
4. "(The Man Who Shot) Liberty Valance" (Hal David, Burt Bacharach) – 3:00 (from Only Love Can Break a Heart)
5. "Louisiana Mama" – 2:20 (Non-album single A-side)
6. "Every Breath I Take" (Gerry Goffin, Carole King) – 2:46 (from The Many Sides of Gene Pitney)

=== Side 2 ===
1. "Tower Tall" (Mel Mandel, Norman Sachs) – 3:21 (from Only Love Can Break a Heart)
2. "Hello Mary Lou" – 2:15 (from The Many Sides of Gene Pitney)
3. "Half Heaven – Half Heartache" (Aaron Schroeder, George Goehring, Wally Gold) – 2:50 (from Only Love Can Break a Heart)
4. "Garden of Love" – 1:45 (non-single LP debut)
5. "Town Without Pity" (Dimitri Tiomkin, Ned Washington) – 2:53 (from The Many Sides of Gene Pitney)
6. "(I Wanna) Love My Life Away" – 1:53 (from The Many Sides of Gene Pitney)
