= Gene Pitney's Big Sixteen, Volume Two =

Compilation album by Gene Pitney
- Released: 1965
- Recorded: 1962–1965
- Genre: Pop
- Length: 38:44
- Label: Musicor (United States); Stateside (United Kingdom)

Gene Pitney chronology
It Hurts to Be in Love and Eleven More Hit Songs (1964)	Gene Pitney's Big Sixteen, Volume Two (1965)	For the First Time! Two Great Stars - George Jones and Gene Pitney (1965)

Professional ratings
Review scores
Source	Rating
AllMusic	3/5 stars

Gene Pitney's Big Sixteen, Volume Two is a compilation album by American singer Gene Pitney released on the Musicor label in the United States in 1965. The album was released as Gene Pitney's More Big Sixteen on the Stateside label in the United Kingdom and served as a companion volume to Gene Pitney's Big Sixteen released the previous year.

The compilation album featured Pitney's two most recent hit singles at the time, "It Hurts to Be in Love" and "I'm Gonna Be Strong", along with a range of lesser hits and album-only tracks from earlier releases and one new track, "Fool Killer".

== Track listing ==
=== Side 1 ===
1. "It Hurts to Be in Love" (Howard Greenfield, Helen Miller) – 2:33 (from It Hurts To Be In Love)
2. "Oh Annie Oh" (Gary Jackson) – 2:34 (from Gene Pitney Meets the Fair Young Ladies of Folkland)
3. "Today's Teardrops" (Gene Pitney, Aaron Schroeder) – 1:55 (from The Many Sides of Gene Pitney)
4. "Fool Killer" (Burt Bacharach, Hal David) – 3:22 (non-single LP debut)
5. "Laurie" (Don Gohman, Hal Hackady) – 2:22 (from Gene Pitney Meets the Fair Young Ladies of Folkland)
6. "Hawaii" (Bob Brass, Al Kooper, Irwin Levine) – 2:07 (from It Hurts To Be In Love)
7. "Little Betty Falling Star" (Burt Bacharach, Bob Hilliard) – 2:25 (from Only Love Can Break a Heart)
8. "Brandy Is My True Love's Name" (Atra Baer, Martin Kalmanoff) – 2:59 (from Gene Pitney Meets the Fair Young Ladies of Folkland)

=== Side 2 ===
1. "I'm Gonna Be Strong" (Barry Mann, Cynthia Weil) – 2:14 (from It Hurts To Be In Love)
2. "Hello Mary Lou" (Pitney) – 2:13 (from The Many Sides of Gene Pitney)
3. "I Love You More Today" (Van McCoy) – 2:18 (from It Hurts To Be In Love)
4. "Half the Laughter, Twice the Tears" (Al Cleveland, Carl Spencer) – 2:11 (from Blue Gene)
5. "Lyda Sue, Wha'dya Do?" (Ben Raleigh, Mark Barkan) – 1:58 (from Gene Pitney Meets the Fair Young Ladies of Folkland)
6. "Not Responsible" (Raleigh, Barkan) – 2:31 (from Gene Pitney Sings Just for You)
7. "Every Breath I Take" (Gerry Goffin, Carole King) – 2:46 (from The Many Sides of Gene Pitney)
8. "I Laughed So Hard I Cried" (Ann Orlowski, Schroeder) – 2:16 (from The Many Sides of Gene Pitney)
