= Gene Italiano =

Studio album by Gene Pitney
- Released: 1964
- Genre: Pop
- Length: 31:51
- Label: Musicor

Gene Pitney chronology
Gene Pitney's Big Sixteen (1964)	Gene Italiano (1964)	It Hurts to Be in Love and Eleven More Hit Songs (1964)

Professional ratings
Review scores
Source	Rating
allmusic.com	3/5 stars

Gene Italiano is American singer Gene Pitney's seventh studio album, and first foreign language album, released on the Musicor label in 1964. The album features a number of Pitney's biggest early hits recorded in Italian, including "Twenty Four Hours From Tulsa", "Town Without Pity" and "Only Love Can Break a Heart".

== Track listing ==
1. "A Poche Ore Da Te (Twenty Four Hours From Tulsa)" (Hal David, Burt Bacharach) – 2:58
2. "Città Spietata (Town Without Pity)" (Dimitri Tiomkin, Ned Washington) – 2:53
3. "Un Soldino (If I Didn't Have A Dime)" (Bert Russell, Phil Medley) – 2:28
4. "Ritorna (Half Heaven – Half Heartache)" (Aaron Schroeder, George Goehring, Wally Gold) – 2:48
5. "Resta Sempre Accanto A Me (True Love Never Runs Smooth)" (David, Bacharach) – 2:25
6. "E Se Domani (If Tomorrow)" (Carlo Alberto Rossi, Giorgio Calabrese)– 2:51
7. "Che Sara Di Me (What Will Happen To Me)" – 2:11
8. "Quando Vedrai La Mia Ragazza (When You See My Girl)" (Enrico Ciacci) – 2:42
9. "E Quando Viene La Notte (Come The Night)" (Daniele Pace)– 2:53
10. "Non Lasciamoci (Only Love Can Break A Heart)" (David, Bacharach) – 2:51
11. "Foglie Morte (Autumn Leaves)" (Johnny Mercer, Joseph Kosma) – 2:36
12. "Vorrei Capire Perchè (Tell Me Why)" (Giuseppe Torrebruno, Leo Chiosso) – 2:15

== EP track listing ==
An EP from the album Canta en Italiano was released by Hispavox in Spain

1. Amici Miei 2:55
2. E Cuando Viene La Notte 2:49
3. Saro Forte 2:14
4. I Tuoi Anni Piu Belli 3:07
