= George Goehring =

American composer (1933–2024)

George Goehring (July 16, 1933 – August 15, 2024) was an American composer, songwriter and pianist, who composed the top ten hits "Lipstick On Your Collar" and "Half Heaven, Half Heartache", as well as for Dion, The Platters, Sarah Vaughn, Elvis Presley, Barbra Streisand and the theme song of the television show Hootenanny.

== Early life and career ==
George Andrew Goehring was born July 16, 1933 in Glenside, PA, a Philadelphia suburb, where he began studying classical piano with the intention of becoming a concert pianist. Learning popular music to play piano bars, he performed at The Pirate Ship in downtown Philadelphia for two years, before learning about the Brill Building, a haven for songwriters and publlshers at 1619 Broadway in New York. In 1955, he secured an audition with Irving Caesar, who had written the lyrics for "Swanee", "Tea for Two" and several other standards. Caesar agreed to publish two of Goehring's first songs, “Daffodilly Duck” and “Our Lady of The Highway,” which was recorded by singer Connie Boswell. With this success, he moved to New York, where he was house pianist at Arthur's Café in Greenwich Village and wrote with various lyricists in the Brill Building, beginning with Ira Kosloff (who also co-wrote Elvis’ #1 "I Want You I Need You I Love You"). Their song “Edge of the Sea” was soon covered by Sarah Vaughn.

Goehring's first song to make the charts at #65 was “The Mystery of You” recorded by the Platters as the B side of "Only Because". Goehring signed a 5-year publishing deal with Joy Music. In 1959 he co-wrote "Lipstick On Your Collar" with fellow staff writer Edna Lewis, who had also co-written "Sixteen Candles". Goehring, who told The Baltimore Sun he made an "unannounced visit to Francis' home to play her the song on her piano," later said “Connie Francis changed my life forever with five words: ‘Okay, I'll take this one.’” Released in May 1959, “Lipstick” went to #5 on the Billboard Hot 100, selling a million copies.

While at Joy Music he also co-wrote songs for “one-hit wonders,” including Diane Ray's “Please Don't Talk to the Lifeguard”, with lyrics by Sylvia Dee, who also wrote “Too Young” and “The End of the World”. The words and music for the song "Hootenanny" (1963) were written by a collaboration of Goehring, Eddie V. Deanem, and Peg Horther. Not every song was a hit single: Elvis’ "Suppose" appeared in Speedway and soundtrack album but was not released as a single and Dion's “Somebody Nobody Wants” was #103 on the Hot 100, immediately preceding the #1 song "Runaround Sue".

In 1962, Goehring, Aaron Schroeder, and Wally Gold wrote "Half Heaven - Half Heartache"; sung by Gene Pitney. The song spent 12 weeks on the Hot 100, peaking at #12, and was #5 on the Middle Road charts, a precursor to today's Adult Contemporary charts. In an interview with Dave McGrath for Gene Pitney's September 2001 fan newsletter, Goehring called it “the biggest thrill of my life...because Gene is my favorite male singer.” Pitney, known for numerous pop hits in the early 1960s, noted that “Half Heaven Half Heartache” was “one of his favorite songs to sing live.” The fan newsletter also noted the song's “unforgettable haunting melody...This breathtaking song of melancholy never fails to bring down the house at concerts.” Like “Lipstick On Your Collar,” it has been recorded by several artists, including Jane Olivor, David Cassidy and Rod MacDonald.

Goehring also wrote "The Wonderful World of Love", with lyrics by Harry Weinstein, a Jewish-American lyricist. While the song was never recorded, the sheet music has survived into the 21st century, and remains in possession of Weinstein's descendants.

== After The Brill Building ==
As more artists wrote their own songs in the late 1960s, Brill Building publishers began to close; Joy Music was sold to Hill-Range and is today owned by Universal Music. Goehring left New York with his partner, Dennis O’Brien. They lived in northern California and West Virginia before settling in northeast Baltimore, MD, near Lake Montebello.

Goehring also composed the music, beginning in 1966, for a musical adaptation of Mary Elizabeth Braddon's novel, “Lady Audley's Secret,” which opened at Balrimore's Center Stage in 1966. The Baltimore Sun's theater critic, R.H. “Hal” Gardner, called it “a triumph” and praised the score for its “Gilbert and Sullivan quality.” The play was revived in 1972 for Off-Broadway in New York. During his years in Maryland, according to Baltimore Sun editor Alan Sea, “George also played an important role in the gay musical community of the 1980s, when he was the piano accompanist for the Baltimore Men's Chorus.” Goehring also operated an antiques store in Waverly, MD, and began collecting antigue commercial art, specialising in hand-painted cigarette and condom tins and other collectibles. The Sun noted Goehring “once scored a collecting coup when he found a tin box that traded on the name of Babe Ruth — a Bambino brand tin.” Goehring and O’Brien, along with GK Elliott, later published a book for collectors of hand-painted condom tins, Remember Your Rubbers.

In 1992, Goehring was shot in the hand by a U.S. postal agent during a botched drug raid at his home. He settled a lawsuit against the Postal Service for $150,000. In 2006, Goehring and O’Brien moved to Delray Beach, FL, where he and O'Brien later officially married.

In 2006, Goering teamed up with jazz singer-violinist Nicole Yarling and singer-songwriters Ellen Bukstel and Rod MacDonald to perform “My Life In The Brill Building,” a retrospective concert of Goehring's songs and stories. Writing for the web site “Gotfolk,” Heather Tanksley called it “one of THE MOST entertaining and interesting shows I've ever attended!... George Goehring's storytelling ability, self-effacing humor, and genuinely warm and humble persona were simply delightful to behold.... If you are a lover of "oldies but goodies" and want to learn more about the creation of pop music in the '60s straight from the horse's mouth (so to speak), then you shouldn't miss this show!!

== Later years ==
Goehring's longtime partner Dennis O’Brien died in 2023, and Goehring moved into Amazing Grace Assisted Living in West Palm Beach, Florida, where ““George loved playing his music and was still entertaining the people in his assisted living home only a few weeks ago,” according to Mr. Sea in The Baltimore Sun. He died August 15, 2024, 91 years old; at Amazing Grace. A cause of death was not available.
