= George Jones & Gene Pitney – Recorded in Nashville, Tennessee! =

George Jones and Gene Pitney (Recorded in Nashville!)

Studio album by George Jones and Gene Pitney
- Released: 1965
- Recorded: in Nashville, TN
- Genre: Country
- Label: Musicor

George Jones and Gene Pitney chronology
George Jones and Gene Pitney: For the First Time! Two Great Singers (1965)	George Jones and Gene Pitney (Recorded in Nashville!) (1965)	Mr. Country & Western Music (1965)

Gene Pitney chronology
George Jones and Gene Pitney: For the First Time! Two Great Singers (1965)	George Jones and Gene Pitney (Recorded in Nashville!) (1965)	I Must Be Seeing Things (1965)

George Jones and Gene Pitney – Recorded in Nashville! is an album by American country music artist George Jones and rock and roll artist Gene Pitney. The album is also known as It's Country Time Again!

== Track listing ==
1. "Mockin' Bird Hill" (Vaughn Horton)
2. "As Long as I Live" (Roy Acuff)
3. "My Favorite Lies"(George Jones, Jack Ripley)
4. "Y'all Come" (Arlie Duff)
5. "Someday (You'll Want Me to Want You)" (Jimmy Hodges)
6. "Love Bug" (Wayne Kemp, Curtis Wayne)
7. "Big Job" (Jones, Hank Mills)
8. "Your Old Standby" (Jim Eanes, Wayne Perry)
9. "Why Baby Why" (Jones, Darrell Edwards)
10. "That's All It Took" (Jones, Darrell Edwards, C. Grier)
11. "Louisiana Man" (Doug Kershaw)
12. "I Can't Stop Loving You" (Don Gibson)
