= I Must Be Seeing Things =

Studio album by Gene Pitney
- Released: 1965
- Genre: Pop
- Length: 31:23 (US); 32:22 (UK)
- Label: Musicor (United States); Stateside (United Kingdom)

Gene Pitney chronology
For the First Time! Two Great Stars - George Jones and Gene Pitney (1964)	I Must Be Seeing Things (1965)	It's Country Time Again! (1965)

Professional ratings
Review scores
Source	Rating
Allmusic	3/5 stars
Record Mirror	4/5 stars

I Must Be Seeing Things is the ninth studio album released by American singer Gene Pitney, released on the Musicor label in the United States in 1965. The album was released as Looking Thru the Eyes of Love on the Stateside label in the United Kingdom.

== Background ==
At the time of this album's release, Musicor Records was in the middle of a distribution transformation. Art Talmadge, an employee of Musicor's parent United Artists Records, had recently bought the label from UA and ran it (along with fellow UA employee Harold "Pappy" Daily) under his newly created Talmadge Productions company. Although all album covers bear the Talmadge Productions name, labels of first pressings still included the United Artists byline at the bottom. Once Musicor's transformation from UA to Talmadge was completed, the byline was changed on the label (which also underwent some other cosmetic changes) and the I Must Be Seeing Things album continued circulation.

Original copies with the UA byline feature "Looking Thru (sic) The Eyes Of Love" on side 2, track 6. This was replaced on the new Talmadge labeled copies with "If I Never Get To Love You".

The title track was a top 10 hit in Canada and the UK but only reached #31 in the US. The UK release of the album featured "Looking Through the Eyes of Love", a top 10 hit in the UK as well as Canada.

== Track listing ==
=== Side 1 ===
1. "I Must Be Seeing Things" (Bob Brass, Al Kooper, Irwin Levine) – 2:29
2. "Marianne" (Gene Pitney) – 2:42
3. "Save Your Love" (Pitney) – 3:16
4. "Down in the Subway" (Peter Udell, Gary Geld) – 2:38
5. "If Mary's There" (Udell, Geld) – 2:24
6. "Don't Take Candy From A Stranger" (Brass, Kooper, Irwin Levine) – 2:06

=== Side 2 ===
1. "One Day" (Doc Pomus, Mort Shuman) – 2:51
2. "She's Still There" (Kooper, Levine) – 2:47
3. "Just One Smile" (Randy Newman) – 2:44
4. "There's No Livin's Without Your Lovin'" (Jerry Harris, Paul Kaufman) – 2:52
5. "I Lost Tomorrow (Yesterday)" (Jason Darrow) – 2:17
6. "Looking Through the Eyes of Love" (Barry Mann, Cynthia Weil) – 3:16

=== Side 1 ===
1. "I Must Be Seeing Things" – 2:29
2. "Marianne" – 2:42
3. "Save Your Love" – 3:16
4. "Down in the Subway" – 2:38
5. "If Mary's There" – 2:24
6. "Don't Take Candy From A Stranger" – 2:06

=== Side 2 ===
1. "One Day" – 2:51
2. "She's Still There" – 2:47
3. "Just One Smile" – 2:44
4. "There's No Livin's Without Your Lovin'" – 2:52
5. "I Lost Tomorrow (Yesterday)" – 2:17
6. "If I Never Get To Love You" (Hal David, Burt Bacharach) – 2:17

== Singles ==
Year	Titles	Chart position
Year	Titles	Billboard
1965	"I Must Be Seeing Things " b/w "Marianne"	31
1965	"Looking Through the Eyes of Love" b/w "There's No Livin' Without Your Lovin'"	28
1967	"Just One Smile" b/w "Innamorata"	64
