= It Hurts to Be in Love and Eleven More Hit Songs =

Studio album by Gene Pitney
- Released: 1964
- Genre: Pop
- Label: Musicor (United States); Stateside (United Kingdom)

Gene Pitney chronology
Gene Italiano (1964)	It Hurts to Be in Love and Eleven More Hit Songs (1964)	Gene Pitney's Big Sixteen, Volume Two (1965)

Professional ratings
Review scores
Source	Rating
allmusic.com	3/5 stars
Record Mirror	4/5 stars

It Hurts to Be in Love and Eleven More Hit Songs is American singer Gene Pitney's eighth studio album, released on the Musicor label in the United States in 1964. The album was released as I'm Gonna Be Strong on the Stateside label in the United Kingdom.

The album marked a turning point in Pitney's career with his popularity waning in his home country while rising in Britain. The title track, "It Hurts to Be in Love", and "I'm Gonna Be Strong" were Pitney's last top 10 hits in the United States. The latter single as well as "That Girl Belongs to Yesterday", an early Jagger/Richards composition, were also top 10 hits in the United Kingdom.

The album reached No. 42 on the US albums chart and stayed on the Billboard 200 for 17 weeks.

== Track listing ==
1. "I'm Gonna Be Strong" (Barry Mann, Cynthia Weil) – 2:12
2. "Walk" (Helen Miller, Howard Greenfield) – 2:21
3. "I Love You More Today" (Van McCoy) – 2:18
4. "Who Needs It" (Len Beadle, Robin Conrad) – 2:08
5. "Follow the Sun" (Peter Udell, Gary Geld) – 2:28
6. "Lips Are Redder On You" (Joe Meek) – 2:20
7. "It Hurts to Be in Love" (Miller, Greenfield) – 2:34
8. "The Last Two People On Earth" (Bob Brass, Al Kooper, Irwin Levine) – 2:52
9. "That Girl Belongs to Yesterday" (Mick Jagger, Keith Richards) – 2:51
10. "E Se Domani" (Carlo Alberto Rossi, Giorgio Calabrese) – 2:48
11. "Hawaii" (Brass, Kooper, Levine) – 2:08
12. "I'm Gonna Find Myself a Girl" (Ray Adams, Valerie Avon, Elaine Adams) – 2:39

== Singles ==
Year	Titles	Chart position
Year	Titles	Billboard
1964	"It Hurts to Be in Love" b/w "Hawaii"	7
1964	"I'm Gonna Be Strong" b/w "E Se Domani"	9
1964	"That Girl Belongs to Yesterday" b/w "Who Needs It"	47
