= The Many Sides of Gene Pitney =

Studio album by Gene Pitney
- Released: 1962
- Genre: Pop
- Length: 29:36
- Label: Musicor
- Producer: Aaron Schroeder

Gene Pitney chronology
The Many Sides of Gene Pitney (1962)	Only Love Can Break a Heart (1962)

Professional ratings
Review scores
Source	Rating
allmusic.com	3/5 stars

The Many Sides of Gene Pitney is the debut album of Gene Pitney, released on the Musicor label in 1962. It was mostly a collection of previously released singles. Among them was "(I Wanna) Love My Life Away" which charted at #39 on the Billboard Hot 100 on March 4, 1961 and was on the charts for eight weeks. The song "Every Breath I Take" charted as high as #42 on September 16, 1961, and was on the charts for eight weeks. "Town Without Pity" rose as high as #13 on January 27, 1962 and was on the charts for 19 weeks. It also features two songs that Pitney had previously written for Ricky Nelson, "Hello Mary Lou" and "Today's Teardrops"; the latter also recorded by Roy Orbison.

== Track listing ==
1. "Town Without Pity" (Dimitri Tiomkin, Ned Washington) – 2:55
2. "(I Wanna) Love My Life Away" (Pitney) – 1:56
3. "I Laughed So Hard I Cried" (Aaron Schroeder, Ann Orlowski) – 2:19
4. "Dream For Sale" (Phil Spector, Terry Phillips) – 2:34
5. "Twenty Two Days" (Pitney) – 2:32
6. "Today's Teardrops" (Schroeder, Pitney) – 1:56
7. "Hello Mary Lou" (Pitney) – 1:56
8. "Take Me Tonight" (Schroeder, Roy Alfred, Wally Gold) – 2:37
9. "Harmony" (Pitney) – 1:58
10. "A Greater Love" (Schroeder, Pitney) – 2:05
11. "Every Breath I Take" (Gerry Goffin, Carole King) – 2:47
12. "Sure Fire Bet" (Pitney) – 1:48
13. "Chance to Belong" (Pitney) – 2:03
