= Gene Pitney Meets the Fair Young Ladies of Folkland =

Studio album by Gene Pitney
- Released: 1964
- Genre: Folk
- Length: 32:47
- Label: Musicor

Gene Pitney chronology
| Blue Gene (1963) | Gene Pitney Meets the Fair Young Ladies of Folkland (1964) | Gene Pitney's Big Sixteen (1964) |

Professional ratings
Review scores
| Source | Rating |
|---|---|
| allmusic.com | 2.5/5 stars |

Gene Pitney Meets the Fair Young Ladies of Folkland is American singer Gene Pitney's sixth album, released on the Musicor label in 1964. Initially released under the title Dedicated to My Teen Queens, the album contains folk songs about young women. The album did not chart and none of the tracks were released as singles.

== Track listing ==
1. "Those Eyes O' Liza Jane" (Aaron Schroeder, Wally Gold) – 2:23
2. "Laurie" (Don Gohman, Hal Hackady) – 2:23
3. "Brandy is My True Love's Name" (Atra Baer, Martin Kalmanoff) – 3:00
4. "My Sali-Ram" (Johnny Mandel, Norman Sachs) – 2:10
5. "Little Nell" – 3:17
6. "Melissa and Me" – 2:45
7. "Oh, Annie, Oh" (Gary Jackson) – 2:35
8. "Lyda Sue, Wha'dya Do?" (Oramae Diamond, Jimmy Radcliffe) – 1:59
9. "Carrie" (Schroeder, Gold) – 2:36
10. "Hey, Pretty Little Black Eyed Suzie" – 2:04
11. "Song of Lorena" – 3:11
12. "Darlin' Corey, Ain't Ya Comin'" (Mandel, Sachs) – 2:03
13. "The Ballad of Aura Mae" (Mandel, Sachs) – 2:18
