= George Jones & Gene Pitney – For the First Time! Two Great Stars =

George Jones and Gene Pitney: For the First Time! Two Great Singers

Studio album by George Jones and Gene Pitney
- Released: February 1965
- Genre: Country
- Label: Musicor (United States); Stateside (United Kingdom)

George Jones chronology
Famous Country Duets	George Jones and Gene Pitney: For the First Time! Two Great Singers (1965)	It's Country Time Again! (1965)

Gene Pitney chronology
Gene Pitney's Big Sixteen, Volume Two (1965)	George Jones and Gene Pitney: For the First Time! Two Great Singers (1965)	George Jones & Gene Pitney – Recorded in Nashville, Tennessee! (1965)

Singles from George Jones and Gene Pitney: For the First Time! Two Great Singers
- 1. "Things Have Gone to Pieces" Released: March 13, 1965; 2. "I've Got Five Dollars and It's Saturday Night" Released: February 24, 1965

For the First Time! Two Great Stars – George Jones and Gene Pitney is an album by American country music artist George Jones and pop artist Gene Pitney. It was released in February 1965 on the Musicor label in the United States and on the Stateside label in the United Kingdom.

== Background ==
After Jones left United Artists to join Musicor in 1965, it was decided that he start off with a duet recording session with teen idol Gene Pitney, and this release was motivated more by the fact that Pitney was also signed to Musicor rather than any musical compatibility. However, Pitney manages to hold his own with Jones and the album became a hit, rising to number three on the country album chart. The album was Pitney's eleventh for Musicor, and the pair would record one more duet album together called It's Country Time Again in 1966. The Bear Family record label would reissue both albums under the title George Jones & Gene Pitney, collecting 31 sides that the pair recorded together.

== Reception ==
Chris Woodstra of AllMusic writes, "For a seemingly unlikely pairing, the two complemented each other well, with Pitney proving himself not only a fan of the genre but also a competent country singer as well."

== Track listing ==
1. "I've Got Five Dollars and It's Saturday Night" (Ted Daffan)
2. "I Really Don't Want to Know" (Howard Barnes, Don Robertson) Gene Pitney solo
3. "I'm a Fool to Care" (Daffan)
4. "My Shoes Keep Walking Back to You" (Lee Ross, Bob Wills)
5. "Sweeter Than the Flowers" (Morrey Burns, Syd Nathan, Ervin T. Rouse)
6. "Wearing My Heart Away" (Charles K. Harris) George Jones solo
7. "One Has My Name" (Hal Blair, Eddie Dean, Lorene Dean)
8. "Things Have Gone to Pieces" (Leon Payne) George Jones solo
9. "I've Got a New Heartache" (Wayne Walker)
10. "Don't Rob Another Man's Castle" (Jenny Lou Carson)
11. "Wreck on the Highway" (Dorsey Dixon)
12. "Born to Lose" (Frankie Brown, Daffin) Gene Pitney solo
