= David Vanian and the Phantom Chords (album) =

- Album cover

Studio album by Dave Vanian and the Phantom Chords
- Released: 27 March 1995
- Genres: Gothabilly; gothic rock; psychobilly; rockabilly
- Length: 49:43
- Label: Big Beat CDWIK 140
- Producer: Benji Le Fe'vre

Dave Vanian and the Phantom Chords chronology
"Town Without Pity" (single) (1992)	David Vanian and the Phantom Chords (1995)

Professional ratings
Review scores
Source	Rating
Allmusic	3.5/5 stars

Big Beat Presents David Vanian and the Phantom Chords is a 1995 album by British rock band Dave Vanian and the Phantom Chords. The album features a mix of original material and cover songs (some from the 1950s and '60s), performed in a fusion of punk rock, gothic rock, and rockabilly.

== Track listing ==
1. "Voodoo Doll" (Clyde Dempsey, Roman Jugg, Brendan Mooney) — 3:23
2. "Screamin' Kid" (Roman Jugg) — 3:31
3. "Big Town" (David Vanian) — 4:43
4. "This House Is Haunted" (Basil Adlam, Billy Rose) — 2:17
5. "You and I" (Dave Gonzales) — 4:06
6. "Whiskey and Me" (Donagh O'Leary) — 3:53
7. "Fever in My Blood" (Brendan Mooney) — 3:03
8. "Frenzy" (David Hill, Bobby Stevenson) — 1:48
9. "Shooting Jones (Blue Eyes, Black Heart)" (Brendan Mooney) — 4:42
10. "Jezebel" (Wayne Shanklin) — 2:49
11. "Tonight We Ride" (David Vanian) — 3:20
12. "Johnny Guitar" (Peggy Lee, Victor Young) — 2:43
13. "Chase the Wild Wind" (David Vanian) — 4:14
14. "Swamp Thing" (Roman Jugg, David Vanian) — 5:11

== Personnel ==
- David Vanian - vocals
- Roman Jugg - lead guitar
- Brendan Mooney - rhythm guitar
- Steve Lawrence - bass
- Donaugh O'Leary - bass
- Clyde Dempsey - drums
- Benji Le Fevre - producer
