= Mecca (song) =

Single by Gene Pitney

from the album Gene Pitney Sings Just for You
- B-side: "Teardrop by Teardrop"
- Released: March 1963
- Genre: Pop
- Length: 2:18
- Label: Musicor
- Songwriter(s): Neval Nader, John Gluck Jr.
- Producer(s): Jerry Ragovoy

Gene Pitney singles chronology
"Half Heaven - Half Heartache" (1962)	"Mecca" (1963)	"True Love Never Runs Smooth" (1963)

"Mecca" is a 1963 song which was a hit for Gene Pitney. It was the first release and greatest hit from his LP, Gene Pitney Sings Just for You.

== Lyrics ==
The song starts with "I live on the west side, she lives on the east side of the street." "Mecca," a city that most of the world is forbidden to visit, symbolizes her side of the street, as the girl's parents forbid the pair to become romantically involved because of their young age.

== Charts ==
In the U.S., "Mecca" peaked at #12 on the pop chart and #4 Easy Listening. It was a bigger hit in Australia, where it peaked at #7, and in Canada where it reached #2. The B-side, "Teardrop by Teardrop," charted at #130 on the Billboard Bubbling Under the Hot 100 chart.

=== Chart history ===
Chart (1963)	Peak position
Australia - Music Maker	7
Canada - CHUM	2
U.S. Billboard Hot 100	12
U.S. Billboard - Middle-Road Singles	4
U.S. Cash Box Top 100	13
