= The Partridge Family Notebook =

Studio album by The Partridge Family
- Released: November 1972
- Recorded: 1972
- Studio: United Western (Hollywood)
- Genre: Rock
- Length: 32:49
- Label: Bell
- Producer: Wes Farrell

The Partridge Family chronology
| At Home with Their Greatest Hits (1972) | The Partridge Family Notebook (1972) | Crossword Puzzle (1973) |

Singles from The Partridge Family Notebook
- 1. "Looking Through the Eyes of Love" Released: 1972

Professional ratings
Review scores
| Source | Rating |
|---|---|
| AllMusic | 2.5/5 stars |
| Christgau's Record Guide | D+ |

The Partridge Family Notebook is the sixth studio album by The Partridge Family. Released in November 1972, the album entered Billboard's Top LP's chart in December, peaking at no. 41 in January 1973 – the same week in which its lead single, a cover of Barry Mann and Cynthia Weil's "Looking Through the Eyes of Love", peaked at 39 on Billboard's Hot 100. The album remained in the Top 200 for 16 weeks, and was the first by the Partridge Family not to reach the Top 40.

A second US single, "Friend and a Lover", was released in March 1973 but stalled at no. 99 on the Hot 100.

The Partridges' version of "Looking Through the Eyes of Love" – originally a hit for Gene Pitney in 1965 (US 28/UK 3) – fared better in the UK, where it peaked at no. 9 in late February and early March, at the height of both the glam rock era and David Cassidy's career as a teen idol solo star in Great Britain and Ireland. The single, which shared the Top Ten with glam giants Slade, the Sweet and Gary Glitter, immediately followed Cassidy's solo hit "Rock Me Baby" in the charts (UK no. 11/US 38) and slightly overlapped with Cassidy's next UK solo hit, the double A-side single "I Am a Clown / Some Kind of A Summer" (UK no. 3), which was not released in the States.

Notebook also featured a cover of "Walking in the Rain" – a 1964 Ronettes classic also by Barry Mann and Cynthia Weil, but co-written with Phil Spector. The Partridges' cover, which was not released as a single in America, reached no. 10 in the UK in June 1973. The album did not chart in the UK despite yielding two hit singles there.

The Notebook album cover was designed to resemble a standard school notebook. The cover of the UK and Europe album releases, as with the CD reissue many years later, featured a picture of the family in their usual red velvet suits.

== Track listing ==
All tracks, except "Take Good Care of Her", "We Gotta Get Out Of This Place" and "Something's Wrong", were featured on the TV show (mainly from Season 3)

Side one
| No. | Title | Writer(s) | Length |
|---|---|---|---|
| 1. | "Friend and a Lover" | Wes Farrell; Danny Janssen; Bobby Hart | 2:29 |
| 2. | "Walking in the Rain" | Barry Mann; Phil Spector; Cynthia Weil | 2:58 |
| 3. | "Take Good Care of Her" | Danny Janssen; Bobby Hart | 2:42 |
| 4. | "Together We're Better" | Tony Romeo; Ken Jacobson | 2:38 |
| 5. | "Looking Through the Eyes of Love" | Barry Mann; Cynthia Weil | 3:03 |
| 6. | "Maybe Someday" | Austin Roberts; John Machael Hill | 2:56 |

Side two
| No. | Title | Writer(s) | Length |
|---|---|---|---|
| 1. | "We Gotta Get Outta This Place" | Barry Mann; Cynthia Weil | 3:55 |
| 2. | "Storybook Love" | Wes Farrell; Adam Miller | 2:42 |
| 3. | "Love Must Be the Answer" | Wes Farrell; Peggy Clinger; Johnny Cymbal | 3:10 |
| 4. | "Something's Wrong" | Wes Farrell; Danny Janssen; Bobby Hart | 3:12 |
| 5. | "As Long as You're There" | Adam Miller | 3:04 |
| Total length: | | | 32:49 |

== Personnel ==
- David Cassidy - lead vocals
- Dennis Budimir, Larry Carlton, Louie Shelton, Tommy Tedesco - guitar
- Joe Osborn, Max Bennett - bass
- Larry Knechtel, Mike Melvoin - keyboards
- Hal Blaine - drums
- Bahler Brothers, Jackie Ward, Ron Hicklin, Shirley Jones - background vocals
- Jerry Whitman (tracks: A1, A2, A6), Tom Bahler (tracks: A1, A2, A6) - uncredited background vocals

== Recording dates ==
May 1, 1972

- "Take Good Care of Her"
- "Together We're Better"
- "Looking Through the Eyes of Love"
- "We Gotta Get Outta This Place"
- "Love Must Be the Answer"
- "Something's Wrong"

September 4, 1972

- "Storybook Love"
- "As Long as You're There"

September 22, 1972

- "Friend and a Lover"
- "Walking in the Rain"
- "Maybe Someday"

See recording dates for this and other Partridge Family albums at The Partridge Family Recording Sessions

== Charts ==
=== Album ===
| Chart (1973) | Peak position |
|---|---|
| US Billboard 200 | 41 |

=== Singles ===
| Title | Chart | Peak position |
|---|---|---|
| Looking Through the Eyes of Love | US Billboard Hot 100 | 39 |
| Looking Through the Eyes of Love | US Adult Contemporary (Billboard) | 9 |
| Friend and a Lover | US Billboard Hot 100 | 99 |
