= Blue Gene (Gene Pitney album) =

Studio album by Gene Pitney
- Released: February 1964
- Recorded: 1963
- Genre: Pop
- Length: 33:32
- Label: Musicor
- Producer: Aaron Schroeder, Wally Gold

Gene Pitney chronology
Gene Pitney Sings World Wide Winners (1962)	Blue Gene (1964)	Gene Pitney Meets the Fair Young Ladies of Folkland (1964)

Professional ratings
Review scores
Source	Rating
AllMusic	3/5 stars

Blue Gene is American singer Gene Pitney's fifth album, released on the Musicor label in 1964. The album contained the Burt Bacharach and Hal David hit "Twenty Four Hours from Tulsa", a top 10 hit in the United Kingdom, Canada and Australia and a top 20 hit on the US Billboard Hot 100 (#17), as well as the minor hit "Yesterday's Hero" (#64).

== Reception ==
Bruce Eder of AllMusic stated that "The album found Gene Pitney pursuing the blend of rock, pop, and pre-rock ballads that defined his unique style", and describing the rest of the album as "a stylish and likable collection of songs"

== Track listing ==
1. "Twenty Four Hours from Tulsa" (Hal David, Burt Bacharach) – 3:00
2. "Autumn Leaves" (Johnny Mercer, Joseph Kosma) – 2:38
3. "Half the Laughter, Twice the Tears" (Carl Spencer, Al Cleveland) – 2:12
4. "I'll Be Seeing You" (Irving Kahal, Sammy Fain) – 2:59
5. "Lonely Night Dreams" (John Gluck, Jr., Neval Nader) – 2:42
6. "Answer Me, My Love" (Carl Sigman, Gerhard Winkler) – 3:04
7. "Blue Gene" (C. Taylor) – 2:09
8. "Yesterday's Hero" (Al Cleveland, Carl Spencer) – 2:33
9. "Maybe You'll Be There" (Rube Bloom, Sammy Gallop) – 2:42
10. "Keep Tellin' Yourself" (Ellie Greenwich, Elmo Glick, Tony Powers) – 2:23
11. "I Can't Run Away" (Gary Geld, Peter Udell) – 2:03
12. "House Without Windows" (Fred Tobias, Lee Pockriss) – 2:26

== U.K. album track listing (release on EMI's Stateside label, cat. no. SL 10119) ==
1. "Twenty Four Hours from Tulsa" (Hal David, Burt Bacharach) – 3:00
2. "Autumn Leaves" (Johnny Mercer, Joseph Kosma) – 2:38
3. "Half the Laughter, Twice the Tears" (Carl Spencer, Al Cleveland) – 2:12
4. "I'll Be Seeing You (Irving Kahal, Sammy Fain) – 2:59
5. "Lonely Night Dreams" (John Gluck, Jr., Neval Nader) – 2:42
6. "Answer Me My Love" (Carl Sigman, Gerhard Winkler) – 3:04
7. "Blue Gene" (Chip Taylor) – 2:09
8. "Yesterday's Hero" (Al Cleveland, Carl Spencer) – 2:33
9. "Maybe You'll Be There" (Rube Bloom, Sammy Gallop) – 2:42
10. "Keep Tellin' Yourself" (Ellie Greenwich, Elmo Glick, Tony Powers) – 2:23
11. "I Can't Run Away" (Gary Geld, Peter Udell) – 2:03
12. "Take It Like a Man" (Jerry Leiber, Mike Stoller) – 2:19

== Personnel ==
- Burt Bacharach, Bert Keyes, Garry Sherman – arranger, conductor
