= Kenny Dale =

American singer-songwriter (1951–2020)

Kenny Dale Richard
- Born: Kenneth Dale Eoff; October 3, 1951; Artesia, New Mexico, U.S.
- Died: July 15, 2020 (aged 68) San Antonio, Texas, U.S.
- Genres: Country
- Occupation: Singer
- Instrument: Vocals
- Years active: 1977–1986
- Labels: Capitol

Kenneth Dale Eoff (October 3, 1951 – July 15, 2020), known professionally as Kenny Dale, was an American country music artist.

He was born in Artesia, New Mexico, United States, and musically active in the 1970s, he recorded two albums for Capitol Records and charted several country hits, including "Bluest Heartache of the Year". His biggest hit was a cover version of Gene Pitney's "Only Love Can Break a Heart", which peaked at No. 7. Dale retired from the country music business in the early 1980s, and took up residence in Nashville, Tennessee. He had later worked as a school bus driver in San Antonio, Texas.

Dale died from COVID-19 in San Antonio, Texas, on July 15, 2020. He had entered the hospital on July 12, due to breathing complications.

== Discography ==
=== Albums ===
All albums released on Capitol Records.

Year	Album	US Country
1977	Bluest Heartache of The Year	29
1978	Red Hot Memory	45
1979	Only Love Can Break a Heart	—
1981	When It's Just You and Me	—

=== Singles ===
Year	Single	Chart Positions		Album
Year	Single	US Country	CAN Country	Album
1977	"Bluest Heartache of the Year"	11	23	Bluest Heartache
1977	"Shame Shame on Me (I Had Planned to Be Your Man)"	11	16	Bluest Heartache
1978	"Red Hot Memory"	17	—	Red Hot Memory
1978	"The Loser"	28	—	Red Hot Memory
1978	"Two Hearts Tangled in Love"	18	31	Red Hot Memory
1979	"Down to Earth Woman"	16	60	Only Love Can Break a Heart
1979	"Only Love Can Break a Heart"	7	20	Only Love Can Break a Heart
1979	"Sharing"	15	38	Only Love Can Break a Heart
1980	"Let Me In"	23	50	Only Love Can Break a Heart
1980	"Thank You, Ever-Lovin'"	33	56	When It's Just You and Me
1981	"When It's Just You and Me"	31	—	When It's Just You and Me
1982	"Moanin' the Blues"	65	—	Singles only
1984	"Two Will Be One"	85	—	Singles only
1984	"Take It Slow"	86	—	Singles only
1985	"Look What Love Did to Me"	83	—	Singles only
1986	"I'm Going Crazy"	63	—	Singles only
