= Looking Through the Eyes of Love =

1965 single by Gene Pitney

Single by Gene Pitney

from the album I Must Be Seeing Things
- B-side: "There's No Livin' Without Your Lovin'"
- Released: June 1965
- Genre: Pop
- Length: 3:12
- Label: Musicor 1103
- Songwriters: Barry Mann; Cynthia Weil
- Producers: Stan Kahan; Gene Pitney

Gene Pitney singles chronology
"Last Chance to Turn Around" (1965)	"Looking Through the Eyes of Love" (1965)	"Princess in Rags" (1965)

"Looking Through the Eyes of Love"

Single by The Partridge Family

from the album The Partridge Family Notebook
- B-side: "Storybook Love"
- Released: 1972
- Recorded: 1972
- Genre: Pop
- Label: Bell 45,301
- Songwriters: Barry Mann; Cynthia Weil
- Producer: Wes Farrell

The Partridge Family singles chronology
"Breaking Up Is Hard To Do" (1972)	"Looking Through the Eyes of Love" (1972)	"A Friend and a Lover" (1973)

"Looking Through the Eyes of Love" is a song written and composed by Barry Mann and Cynthia Weil. It became a popular hit in 1965 by Gene Pitney. In 1972, The Partridge Family recorded a cover version.

== Gene Pitney version ==
Gene Pitney was the first artist to have a hit recording of "Looking Through the Eyes of Love" in 1965. His version reached number 3 in both Canada and the United Kingdom, number 28 on the Billboard Hot 100, and number 34 in Australia in 1965. It peaked at #6 on the New Zealand Lever Hit Parade charts. It was featured on Pitney's 1965 album, I Must Be Seeing Things.

The song was produced by Stan Kahan and Pitney.

== The Partridge Family version ==
The Partridge Family recorded a cover version of the song, and it was released as a single in 1972, reaching number 9 on both the U.S. easy listening chart and UK Singles Chart, number 16 in Canada, and number 39 on the Billboard Hot 100, the group's final top 40 hit. Their cover was produced by Wes Farrell and released on Bell Records. It was featured on their 1972 album, The Partridge Family Notebook.
