= Gene Pitney Sings Just for You =

Gene Pitney Sings Just For You

Studio album by Gene Pitney
- Released: 1963
- Genre: Pop
- Length: 29:42
- Label: Musicor

Gene Pitney chronology
Only Love Can Break a Heart (1962)	Gene Pitney Sings Just For You (1963)	Gene Pitney Sings World Wide Winners (1963)

Professional ratings
Review scores
Source	Rating
allmusic.com	2/5 stars

Gene Pitney Sings Just for You is American singer Gene Pitney's third album, released on the Musicor label in 1963. It included the single "Mecca" which reached #12 on the U.S. Hot 100 and was a top 10 hit in Australia and Canada.

== Reception ==
Billboard gave the album a positive reviews, saying "the songs are new, and many of them have the sound and the grove"

== Track listing ==
1. "Teardrop by Teardrop" (Bob Halley) – 2:19
2. "Mecca" (John Gluck Jr., Neval Nader) – 2:21
3. "Cornflower Blue" (Mack David, Sherman Edwards) – 2:49
4. "Not Responsible" (Ben Raleigh, Mark Barkan) – 2:31
5. "The Angels Got Together" (Aaron Schroeder) – 2:46
6. "Don't Let the Neighbours Know" (Gluck, Nader) – 2:18
7. "Ship True Love Goodbye" (Barkan, Nader) – 2:25
8. "House Without Windows" (Fred Tobias, Lee Pockriss) – 2:27
9. "Aladdin's Lamp" (Gene Pitney) – 2:28
10. "Time and the River" (Schroeder, Wally Gold) – 2:32
11. "Peanuts, Popcorn, and Crackerjacks" (Artie Wayne, Raleigh) – 2:35
12. "Tell the Moon to Go to Sleep" (Alan Schackner, Gloria Shayne) – 2:21
