= It's Country Time Again! =

Studio album by George Jones and Gene Pitney
- Released: August 1965
- Recorded: July 1965
- Studio: Columbia Studio, Nashville, Tennessee
- Genre: Country
- Label: Musicor
- Producer: Pappy Daily

George Jones chronology
I'm a People (1966)	It's Country Time Again! (1965)

Gene Pitney chronology
I Must Be Seeing Things (1965)	It's Country Time Again (1965)	Español (1966)

Professional ratings
Review scores
Source	Rating
Allmusic	2.5/5 stars
Record Mirror	3/5 stars

It's Country Time Again! is an album by American country music artists George Jones and Gene Pitney released in August 1965 on the Musicor Records label.

== Background ==
It's Country Time Again! is the sequel to For the First Time! Two Great Stars - George Jones and Gene Pitney, released the year before. It reached number 17 on the US Country Albums chart. The album features the Jones' hits "Love Bug", "My Favorite Lies", and a duet of "Why Baby Why", Jones' first hit from 1955.

The Bear Family record label reissued both albums under the title George Jones & Gene Pitney, collecting 31 sides that the pair recorded together.

== Release ==
The song "That's All It Took" was written by George Jones, Darrell Edwards, and Charlotte Lynn Grier and originally recorded by Jones as a duet with Gene Pitney on Musicor Records. Jones and Pitney had scored a Top 20 hit in 1965 with "I've Got Five Dollars and It's Saturday Night" and also recorded two LPs together. However, "That's All It Took" was not a hit, only making it to number 47 on the Billboard country singles chart. Although a rather obscure song, country-rock pioneer Gram Parsons recorded the song as a duet with Emmylou Harris on his debut solo album GP in 1973. A live version by Parsons and his band the Fallen Angels also appears on the 1982 release Live 1973.

== Track listing ==
1. "Mockin' Bird Hill" (Vaughn Horton)
2. "As Long as I Live" (Roy Acuff)
3. "My Favorite Lies"(George Jones, Jack Ripley) (George Jones solo)
4. "Y'all Come" (Arlie Duff)
5. "Someday You'll Want Me to Want You" (Jimmy Hodges)
6. "Love Bug" (Wayne Kemp, Curtis Wayne) (George Jones solo)
7. "Big Job" (Hank Mills)
8. "Your Old Standby" (Jim Eanes, Wayne Perry)
9. "Why Baby Why" (Jones, Darrell Edwards)
10. "That's All It Took" (Jones, Darrell Edwards, Carlos Grier)
11. "Louisiana Man" (Doug Kershaw)
12. "I Can't Stop Loving You" (Don Gibson) (Gene Pitney solo)

== Charts ==
Chart (1973)	Peak position
US Top Country Albums (Billboard)	17

== Singles ==
Single	Chart	Peak position
Louisiana Man	U.S. Billboard Hot Country Singles	25
Big Job	U.S. Billboard Hot Country Singles	50
That's All It Took	U.S. Billboard Hot Country Singles	47
