= (I Wanna) Love My Life Away =

Single by Gene Pitney
- B-side: "I Laughed So Hard I Cried"
- Released: 1961
- Genre: Pop
- Length: 1:53
- Label: Musicor
- Songwriter: Gene Pitney
- Producer: Aaron Schroeder

"(I Wanna) Love My Life Away" is a song written and sung by Gene Pitney, which he released in 1961. The song was Pitney's first charting single, and spent 8 weeks on the Billboard Hot 100 chart, peaking at No. 39, while reaching No. 23 on Canada's CHUM Hit Parade. In the United Kingdom, the song spent 11 weeks on the Record Retailer chart, reaching No. 26.

Also in 1961, The Brooks Brothers released the single in the UK, as did Vince Eager and Bill and Boyd. Simon Fisher Turner released it as a single in the UK in 1973. Jody Miller released a version in 1978, which reached No. 67 on Billboard's Hot Country Singles chart.

== Chart performance ==
Chart (1961)	Peak position
US Billboard Hot 100	39
Canada - CHUM Hit Parade	23
UK Record Retailer	26
