= Johnny Guitar =

1954 film

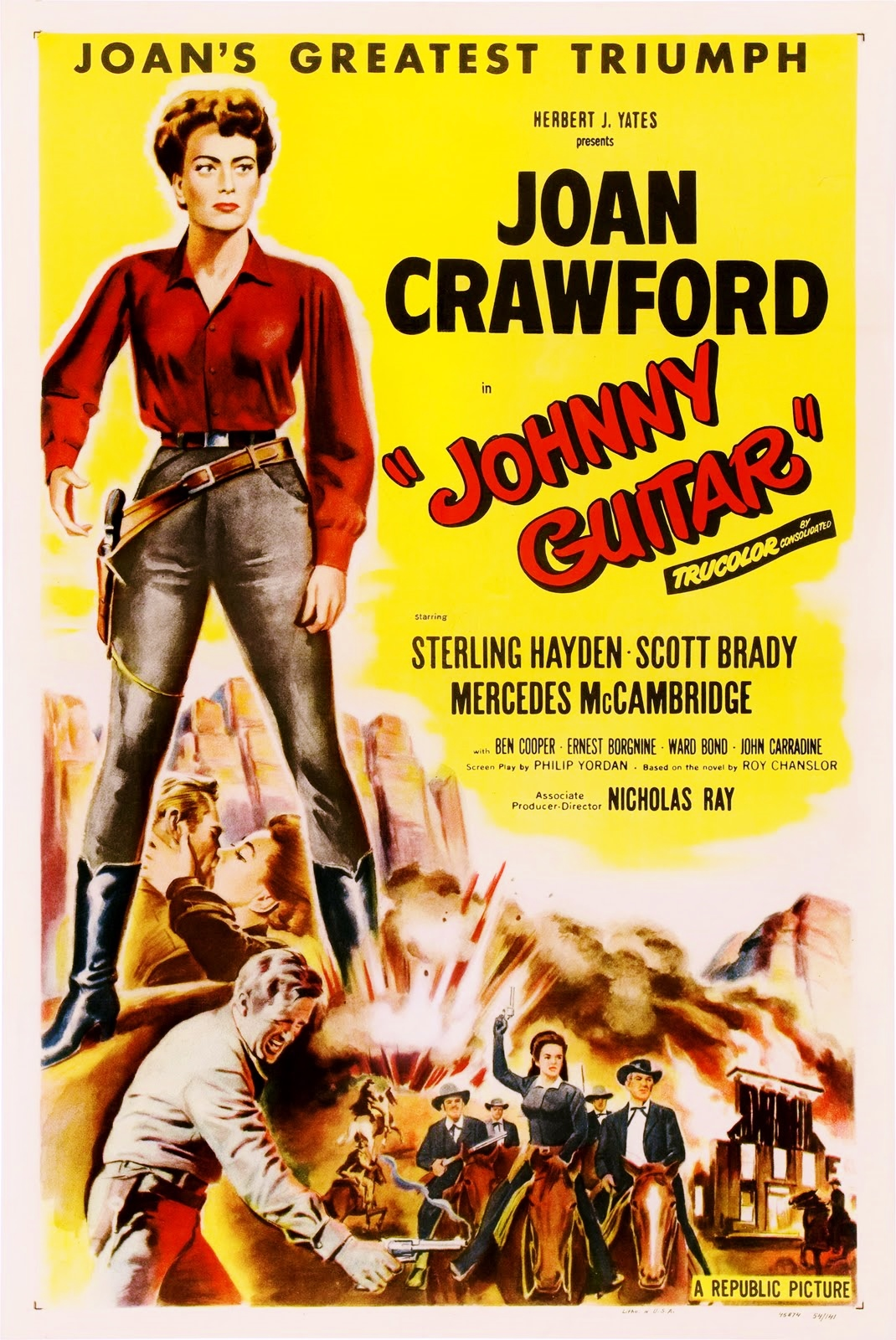
- Original theatrical poster
- Directed by: Nicholas Ray
- Screenplay by: Philip Yordan; Ben Maddow
- Based on: Johnny Guitar by Roy Chanslor
- Produced by: Herbert J. Yates
- Starring: Joan Crawford; Sterling Hayden; Mercedes McCambridge; Scott Brady
- Cinematography: Harry Stradling
- Edited by: Richard L. Van Enger
- Music by: Victor Young
- Color process: Trucolor
- Production company: Republic Pictures
- Distributed by: Republic Pictures
- Release date: May 5, 1954
- Running time: 110 minutes
- Country: United States
- Language: English
- Budget: $1,591,069
- Box office: $2.5 million (United States and Canadian rentals)

Johnny Guitar is a 1954 American independent Western film directed by Nicholas Ray starring Joan Crawford and co-starring Sterling Hayden, Mercedes McCambridge, and Scott Brady, with Ward Bond, Ernest Borgnine, John Carradine, Royal Dano and others in supporting roles. It was produced and distributed by Republic Pictures. The screenplay was adapted from a novel of the same name by Roy Chanslor.

In 2008, Johnny Guitar was selected for preservation in the United States National Film Registry by the Library of Congress as being "culturally, historically, or aesthetically significant".

The main theme of the film's score, composed by Victor Young, and title song, co-written and performed by Peggy Lee, is loosely based on the Spanish Dance No. 5: Andaluza by Enrique Granados. Written by Granados for Piano, though often performed on classical guitar, the piece is played by Joan Crawford's character (dubbed) seated at the saloon piano in one of the film's climactic scenes.

== Plot ==
"Johnny Guitar" Logan arrives in a remote Arizona cattle town and heads to a saloon to see its owner, Vienna, a strong-willed woman and his former lover. Shortly after his arrival, the town locals, who Vienna has a tense relationship with because of her support of a nearby railroad being built, confront her for her working relationship with the "Dancin' Kid" and his gang, who they have accused of robbing the town stagecoach and killing local Emma Small's brother. The Dancin' Kid is Vienna's former lover, while Emma desires the Dancin' Kid's affections and loathes Vienna because of this. Despite Emma's insistence that Vienna is helping the gang commit crimes, Johnny defends her, and local John McIvers gives him, Vienna, and the gang 24 hours to leave town.

After facing off with the gang and drawing the ire of member Bart Lonergan, Johnny argues with Vienna about their five year separation brought on by his violent past as a gunslinger, and they eventually reconcile. They decide to leave town together and Vienna goes to the bank to close her account, but the gang arrives shortly after to rob it, giving Emma an excuse to accuse her of helping with the job. She spurs McIvers and marshal Williams to rally a posse and go after Vienna and Johnny, who are accidentally cut off by the railroad crew dynamiting nearby rock. While the gang flees to their hideout, young member "Turkey" Ralston is gravely injured in the blasts.

Vienna leaves Johnny when he suggests using violence against the posse, returning to the saloon to find her loyal hand Tom tending to Turkey. Tom convinces her to shelter the young man, but when the posse comes and she tries to talk them down, they find Turkey hiding under a table. Emma convinces the group to hang them both as she burns the saloon, while Tom is killed trying to defend them and Williams is accidentally killed by Tom. Turkey is hanged while Johnny saves Vienna and the two escape through a tunnel under the saloon, accidentally coming across the gang's hideout.

As the posse follows Turkey's horse to the hideout, Bart cuts a deal to give Vienna and Johnny up and kills his compatriot when he protests. Johnny kills him before he can kill the Dancin' Kid, while the shots spur the posse to start firing. McIvers, disturbed by the violence he has witnessed, orders his men to stop, leaving a furious Emma to attack the trio and kill the Dancin' Kid. She non-fatally shoots Vienna and Vienna kills her, and the posse allows Johnny and Vienna to leave together.

== Cast ==
- Joan Crawford as Vienna
- Sterling Hayden as Johnny Guitar (Johnny Logan)
- Mercedes McCambridge as Emma Small
- Scott Brady as The Dancin' Kid
- Ward Bond as John McIvers
- Ben Cooper as Turkey Ralston
- Ernest Borgnine as Bart Lonergan
- John Carradine as Old Tom
- Royal Dano as Corey
- Frank Ferguson as Marshal Williams
- Paul Fix as Eddie
- Rhys Williams as Mr. Andrews
- Ian MacDonald as Pete
- Robert Osterloh as Sam (uncredited)
- Trevor Bardette as Jenks (uncredited)
- Denver Pyle (uncredited)
- Sheb Wooley (uncredited)

== Production ==
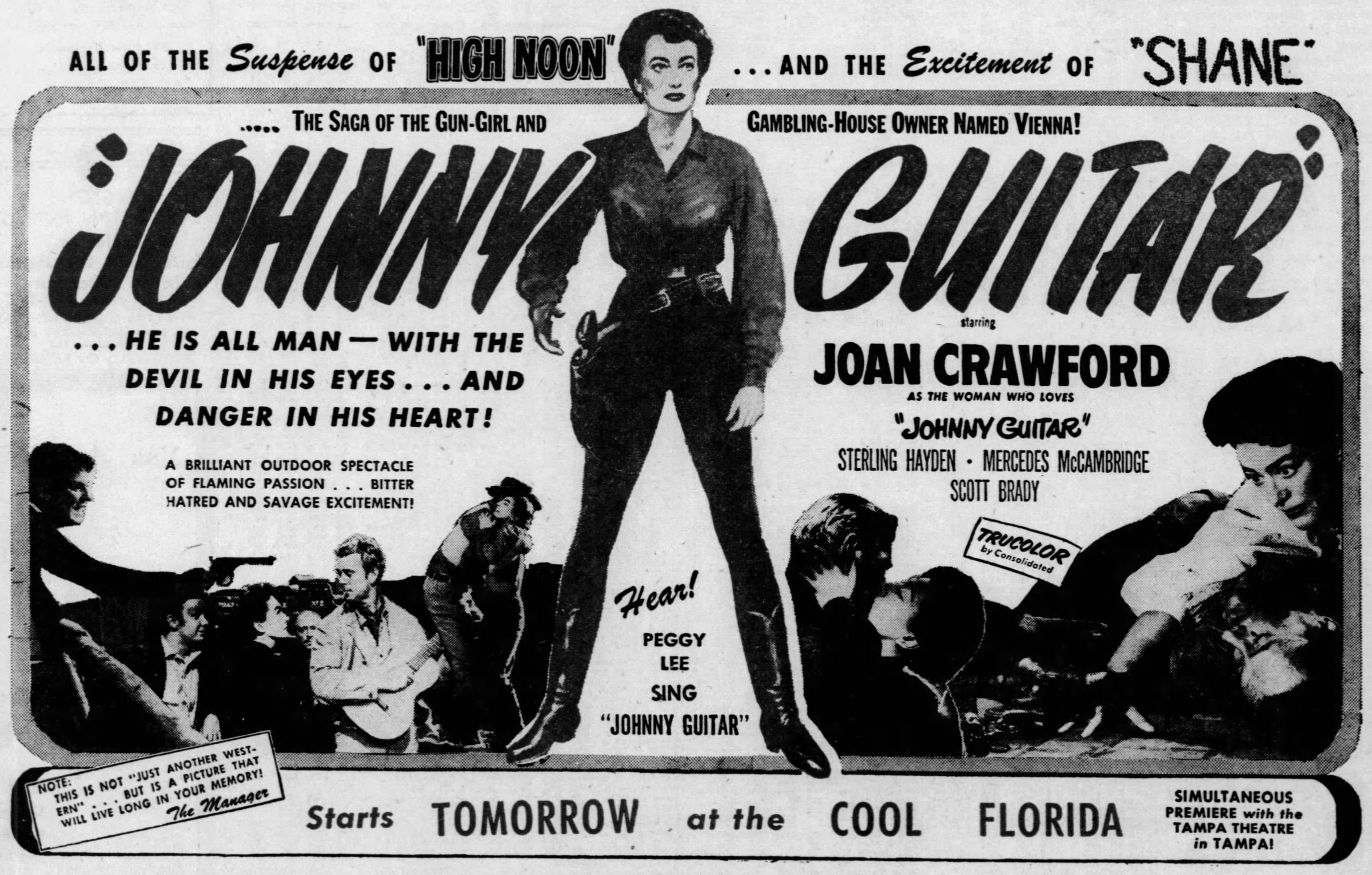
Theatrical advertisement from 1954

Crawford and Nick Ray were scheduled to make a film called Lisbon at Paramount, but the script proved unacceptable. Crawford, who held the film rights to the novel Johnny Guitar, which its author Roy Chanslor had dedicated to her, brought the script to Republic and had the studio hire Ray to direct an adaptation of it.

Crawford wanted either Bette Davis or Barbara Stanwyck for the role of Emma Small, but they were too expensive. Claire Trevor was next in mind for the role but was unable to accept because she was tied up with another film. Finally, Nicholas Ray brought in McCambridge.

Most people claimed Crawford was easy to work with, always professional, generous, patient, and kind. Issues between Crawford and McCambridge cropped up early on, but Ray was not alarmed at first. He found it "heaven sent" that they disliked each other and felt it added greatly to the dramatic conflict. The reasons for the feud appear to date back to a time when Crawford had once dated McCambridge's husband, Fletcher Markle. According to some of the other co-stars, McCambridge needled Crawford about it. McCambridge also appears to have disliked that Crawford and Ray were in the midst of an affair. Crawford, on the other hand, disliked what she perceived to be "special attention" that Ray was giving to McCambridge. Making things worse was that McCambridge was battling alcoholism during this period, something she admitted later contributed to the problems between her and Crawford.

== Home media ==
On September 20, 2016, Olive Films released the film on Blu-ray and DVD as part of its lineup, Olive Signature. The release features an archival introduction from Martin Scorsese, an audio commentary from Geoff Andrew, and several featurettes.

== Reception and legacy ==
=== Box office ===
During its initial theatrical run, Johnny Guitar grossed $2.5 million in North American rentals. According to Kinematograph Weekly the film was a "money maker" at the British box office in 1954.

=== Critical reception ===
Variety commented, "It proves [Crawford] should leave saddles and Levis to someone else and stick to city lights for a background. [The film] is only a fair piece of entertainment. [The scriptwriter] becomes so involved with character nuances and neuroses, all wrapped up in dialogue, that [the picture] never has a chance to rear up in the saddle... The people in the story never achieve much depth, this character shallowness being at odds with the pretentious attempt at analysis to which the script and direction devotes so much time." Bosley Crowther of The New York Times singled out Crawford's physical appearance, stating "no more femininity comes from her than from the rugged Heflin in Shane. For the lady, as usual, is as sexless as the lions on the public library steps and as sharp and romantically forbidding as a package of unwrapped razor blades." He further commented that the film was no more than a "flat walk-through — or occasional ride-through—of western cliches...The color is slightly awful and the Arizona scenery is only fair. Let's put it down as a fiasco. Miss Crawford went that away."

Peter S. Harrison in Harrison's Reports praised the film as "one of the better pictures of its type. Filmed in what is without question the best example of Trucolor photography yet shown, its mixture of romance, hatred and violence grips one's attention throughout, in spite of the fact that it is overburdened with a number of 'talky' passages. This, however, is not a serious flaw and could be corrected by some judicious cutting of the rather overlong running time."

=== Critical re-evaluation ===
According to Martin Scorsese, contemporary American audiences "didn't know what to make of it, so they either ignored it or laughed at it." European audiences, on the other hand, not having the same biases as American audiences, saw Johnny Guitar for what it was: "an intense, unconventional, stylized picture, full of ambiguities and subtexts that rendered it extremely modern." During its release overseas, the film found acclaim by then-critics Jean-Luc Godard and François Truffaut who wrote reviews in the French film magazine Cahiers du Cinéma. Truffaut further described the film as the "Beauty and the Beast of Westerns, a Western dream". He was especially impressed by the film's extravagance: the bold colors, the poetry of the dialogue in certain scenes, and the theatricality which results in cowboys vanishing and dying "with the grace of ballerinas".

In his 1988 release Women on the Verge of a Nervous Breakdown, Spanish director Pedro Almodóvar paid homage to the film. His lead character Pepa Marcos (Carmen Maura), a voice artist, passes out while dubbing Vienna's voice in a scene where Johnny (voiced earlier by Pepa's ex-lover Iván) and Vienna banter about their conflicted past. Almodóvar's film also ends with a chase and an obsessed woman shooting at his lead character. In 2012, Japanese film director Shinji Aoyama listed Johnny Guitar as one of the greatest films of all time. He said, "Johnny Guitar is the only movie that I'd like to remake someday, although I know that it's impossible. It's probably closest to the worst nightmare I can have. I know for sure that my desire to remake this movie comes from my warped thought that I want to remake my own nightmare."

On the review aggregate website Rotten Tomatoes, the film has an approval rating of 94% with an average score of 8.52/10 based on 52 critics. The website's critical consensus reads: "Johnny Guitar confidently strides through genre conventions, emerging with a brilliant statement that transcends its period setting -- and left an indelible mark." Metacritic, which uses a weighted average, assigned the film a score of 83 out of 100, based on 4 critics, indicating "universal acclaim".

In 2008, the film was selected for the National Film Registry by the Library of Congress as a culturally, historically and aesthetically significant piece of American cinema.

The film is recognized by American Film Institute in these lists:

- 2003: AFI's 100 Years...100 Heroes & Villains:
  - Emma Small – Nominated Villain
- 2008: AFI's 10 Top 10:
  - Nominated Western Film

== Stage musical adaptation ==
A stage musical based on the film and novel was created and debuted Off-Broadway in 2004, with a book by American television producer Nicholas van Hoogstraten, lyrics by Joel Higgins, and music by Martin Silvestri and Joel Higgins. The musical was nominated for numerous awards for the original production, and has been produced around the world. Licensing is available through Concord Theatricals.

== In popular culture ==
- The film is seen briefly in Women on the Verge of a Nervous Breakdown as the characters portrayed by Carmen Maura and Fernando Guillén are dubbers for the film into Spanish.
- Vienna and Jill McBain (Claudia Cardinale) of Sergio Leone's Once Upon a Time in the West have similar backstories (both may be former prostitutes who become saloonkeepers), and both own land where a train station will be built because of access to water. Also, Harmonica (Charles Bronson), like Sterling Hayden's title character, is a mysterious, gunslinging outsider known by his musical nickname. Some of West's central plot (Western settlers vs. the railroad company) may be recycled from Johnny Guitar.
- While on the run, the murderous couple in François Truffaut's Mississippi Mermaid (La Sirène du Mississippi), played by Jean-Paul Belmondo and Catherine Deneuve, go to a showing of Johnny Guitar in Lyon and discuss the film in the street afterwards.
- In Bonanza, episode 12.1, "The Night Virginia City Died", Vienna's bar is burned down for the umpteenth time. The footage is spectacular, and appears to have been used in many films and TV shows.
- In the 1971 western spoof Support Your Local Gunfighter, actor Ben Cooper parodies his own role as a young gunslinger in over his head.
- In the Sunn O))) band's album, White1, the song "My Wall" frequently mentions Johnny Guitar in its lyrics.
- The movie is mentioned by the main hero of Jean-Luc Godard's 10th feature film, Pierrot Le Fou (1965) and in La Chinoise (1967) by Henri, who gets expelled from the revolutionary cell for defending the movie. In Weekend (1967), 'Johnny Guitar' is a call sign uttered into a walkie-talkie. While in Histoire(s) du cinéma (1988-1998) and The Image Book (2018), some sequences are quoted and overlapped during Godard's examination of cinema history.
- Shots from the movie are used in Guy Debord's The Society of the Spectacle.
- The title song is heard on radios throughout the Mojave wasteland in the videogame Fallout: New Vegas.
- Musician Johnny "Guitar" Watson adopted his stage name after the film.

== See also ==
- List of cult films
