= Dave Vanian and the Phantom Chords =

British rock band

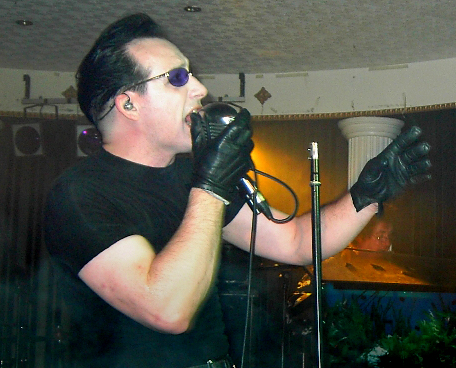
- David Vanian

Background information
- Also known as: The Phantom Chords; David Vanian & the Phantom Chords
- Genres: Gothabilly; gothic rock; psychobilly; rockabilly
- Years active: 1990 – c. 1999
- Labels: Polydor; Big Beat; Camden Town
- Members: Dave Vanian (vocals); Roman Jugg (guitars); Brendan Mooney (guitars); Clyde Dempsey (drums); Charmaine de Valois (bass); Steff B. Joseph (bass); Donagh O'Leary (bass); Rat Scabies (drums); Steve Lawrence (bass); Bryn Merrick (bass)

Dave Vanian and the Phantom Chords (a.k.a. (the) Phantom Chords) were a 1990s British rock band, featuring The Damned's Dave Vanian on vocals. The band's style is a fusion of rockabilly and gothic rock, which has been classified as gothabilly. They performed a mixture of covers and new material.

== History ==
Following the 1989 breakup of The Damned, Vanian, guitarist Roman Jugg and bassist Bryn Merrick formed the Phantom Chords with Brendan Mooney (guitar) and Clyde Dempsey (drums). In 1990, the debut single by the band ("Johnny Remember Me", a cover of a Geoff Goddard song) was released on Polydor in Australia and M&G Records in the UK.

However, although an 11-track album (including "Johnny Remember Me") was written, and Polydor planned to release it, this did not happen, and only two one-sided acetates of it exist (although it has since become available through bootlegs). A promotional cassette was available for purchase at some of the venues when the band toured the United States later in 1993.

The Phantom Chords released another single in 1992, "Town Without Pity" (a cover of a 1960s Gene Pitney song) on Camden Town Records. Now featuring Donagh O'Leary on bass following the departure of Bryn Merrick In 1995, after touring in Britain and the US, they released a full-length album, David Vanian and the Phantom Chords, on Big Beat Records. At this time they performed "This House Is Haunted" on VH1 UK as well as "Born To Be Wicked" on ITV's It's Bizarre.

The band's line-up was variable. A 1993 Damned reunion (I'm Alright Jack and The Beanstalk) and later resumption of The Damned (with Vanian and Captain Sensible) meant that the Phantom Chords became a side project for Vanian, and they have released nothing since 1995. Roman Jugg left Phantom Chords, saying "I got fed up with relying on someone who was unreliable". However, concerts by Phantom Chords were still taking place in December 1999.

They also recorded a series of demos with Marc Almond, which did not see release until 2006 on the compilation album Little Rough Rhinestones - Volume 2.

== Discography ==
=== Albums ===
- Unreleased album (1990)
- David Vanian and the Phantom Chords (1995, Big Beat)

=== Singles ===
- "Johnny Remember Me" (1990, Polydor)

Released as 12" single, 7" and CD.
Featured "Johnny Remember Me" (Goddard) b/w "Ghost Train" and "Relentless"

- "Town Without Pity" (1992, Camden Town)

Featured "Town Without Pity" b/w "(She's a) Bad Motorcycle"

=== Other appearances ===
- Little Rough Rhinestones - Volume 2 (2006, Blue Star Music; tracks 1, 3–6, 14)

== See also ==
- Phantasmagoria
- I'm Alright Jack and The Beanstalk
- Grave Disorder
