= Johnny Guitar (song) =

Song by Peggy Lee
- Published: 1954
- Composer: Victor Young
- Lyricist: Peggy Lee

"Johnny Guitar" is a song written by Peggy Lee (lyrics) and Victor Young (music) and was the title track of the 1954 film of the same name, directed by Nicholas Ray and starring Joan Crawford. The music loosely echoes several themes from Spanish Dance No. 5: Andaluza by Enrique Granados, which was written for piano, but is often played on classical guitar.

The instrumental for the song is used over the opening credits and throughout the film. The song is played on the piano by Joan Crawford (dubbed) and sung partially at the end by Peggy Lee.

The song appears on the in-game radio stations in the 2010 videogame Fallout: New Vegas.

== Covers ==
Instrumental covers were made by The Leemen, The Spotnicks, Group Seven and Crveni Koralji in the 1960s. Later versions include James Last, Kristi Rose, David Vanian and the Phantom Chords, Die Haut feat. Blixa Bargeld and was sung in French by Jeanne Balibar in 2003. Eric Clapton released an instrumental version on CD single in 2001.

Language covers were done, amongst others :

- in Finnish by Reino Helismaa (lyricist) as "Surujen kitara". and by Anna on the album Odotan Sua Laiturilla... (1993).
- in French by Frida Boccara (1963), Luis Mariano (1956), Magali Noël (1955) and Tino Rossi (1955), either as "Johnny guitar" or "Johnny guitare", w/ lyrics adapted by Pierre Delanoë.
- in German by Daliah Lavi as "Johnny Guitar".
- in English by Italian crooner Renato Carosone, and pop singers Giuni Russo and Mina, in Spanish by Italian singer Gigliola Cinquetti
- in Persian by Iranian singer/ songwriter, Fereydoon Forooghi (1980) as "Bloody Dawn".
- in Japanese by Atsuko Niina, as the second track on her 1983 covers album "Play Room", where the song appears with the secondary title マッチ売りの少女.
- in Spanish by Spanish singer, Paloma San Basilio (1992) as "No Pidas Más".
- in Arabic by Lebanese singer/songwriter Fairuz & Rahbani Brother (1960)
- in Italian by Flow Sandon's (1954), Nico Fidenco (1965) and Carla Boni (1954) as "Johnny Guitar", lyrics adapted by Alberto Curci (Devilli)
- in Hebrew by Miri Aloni (1974) as "Johnny Guitar" (ג'וני גיטאר), lyrics adapted by Avi Koren

== Sources ==
- Young, Victor. Cinema Rhapsodies: The Musical Genius of Victor Young Ontario: (Hit Parade Records, 2006).
