= Only Love Can Break a Heart (album) =

Studio album by Gene Pitney
- Released: October 1962
- Genre: Pop
- Length: 30:54
- Label: Musicor
- Producer: Aaron Schroeder, Wally Gold

Gene Pitney chronology
| The Many Sides of Gene Pitney (1962) | Only Love Can Break a Heart (1962) | Gene Pitney Sings Just for You (1963) |

Professional ratings
Review scores
| Source | Rating |
|---|---|
| Allmusic | 4.5/5 stars |
| New Record Mirror | 3/5 stars |

Only Love Can Break a Heart is the second album by songwriter and recording artist Gene Pitney, released on the Musicor label in 1962. It included the top 10 hits "Only Love Can Break a Heart" (#2) and "(The Man Who Shot) Liberty Valance" (#4), which was written for but not ultimately used in, the film of the same name. Three other singles from the album also charted; "Half Heaven-Half Heartache" at #12, "True Love Never Runs Smooth" at #21, and "If I Didn't Have a Dime" at #58.

== Track listing ==
=== Side 1 ===
1. "True Love Never Runs Smooth" (Hal David, Burt Bacharach) – 2:26
2. "Cry Your Eyes Out" (Ben Raleigh, John Gluck, Jr) – 2:04
3. "Only Love Can Break a Heart" (David, Bacharach) – 2:49
4. "Donna Means Heartbreak" (David, Paul Hampton) – 2:23
5. "I Should Try to Forget" (Aaron Schroeder, Gloria Shayne, Martin Kalmanoff) – 2:12
6. "My Heart, Your Heart" (Bob Halley) – 2:23

=== Side 2 ===
1. "Half Heaven – Half Heartache" (Schroeder, George Goehring, Wally Gold) – 2:43
2. "Tower Tall" (Mel Mandel, Norman Sachs) – 3:21
3. "(The Man Who Shot) Liberty Valance" (David, Bacharach) – 2:58
4. "Little Betty Falling Star" (Bob Hilliard, Bacharach) – 2:22
5. "If I Didn't Have a Dime" (Bert Russell, Phil Medley) – 2:31
6. "Going to Church on Sunday" (Halley) – 2:53

== Personnel ==
- Gene Pitney – vocals
- Alan Lorber, Burt Bacharach, Chuck Sagle – arranger, conductor
- Maurice Seymour – cover photography
- Norman Weiser – artwork
