= Crossword Puzzle =

Studio album by The Partridge Family
- Released: June 1973
- Recorded: California
- Studio: United Western (Hollywood)
- Genre: Rock
- Length: 31:31
- Label: Bell
- Producer: Wes Farrell

The Partridge Family chronology
The Partridge Family Notebook (1972)	Crossword Puzzle (1973)	Bulletin Board (1973)

Professional ratings
Review scores
Source	Rating
AllMusic	2.5/5 stars

Crossword Puzzle is the seventh and penultimate studio album by The Partridge Family. Released in June 1973, it was the last Partridge Family album to chart in the US, entering Billboard's Top LP's chart in July and peaking at no. 167 in its second of just five weeks in the Top 200. Bell Records, losing faith in the group after oversaturating the market with product, chose not to release a US single from the album, though "Sunshine" was released as a single in Japan.

The LP cover featured a crossword puzzle, with the answers given inside on one side of the dust sleeve. As with previous release The Partridge Family Notebook, the American album cover of Crossword Puzzle included no group photo, but did feature small black-and-white photos of Shirley Jones (at left) and David Cassidy (at right).

In 2003 the album was released on CD on Arista's BMG Heritage Records label.

== Track listing ==
All tracks, except "It's A Long Way To Heaven", "Now That You Got Me Where You Want Me" and "Let Your Love Go", were featured on the TV show (mainly from Season 3).

Side one
No.	Title	Writer(s)	Length
1.	"One Day at a Time"	Terry Cashman; Tommy West	3:00
2.	"Sunshine"	Wes Farrell; Danny Janssen; Bobby Hart	2:43
3.	"As Long As There's You"	Tony Romeo	2:57
4.	"It's a Long Way to Heaven"	Mark James	2:39
5.	"Now That You Got Me Where You Want Me"	Wes Farrell; Danny Janssen; Bobby Hart	2:45
6.	"It Means I'm in Love with You"	Tony Romeo; Ralph Landis	4:00

Side two
No.	Title	Writer(s)	Length
1.	"Come On Love"	Terry Cashman; Tommy West	3:43
2.	"I Got Your Love All Over Me"	Johnny Cymbal; Peggy Clinger	2:39
3.	"Let Your Love Go"	Wes Farrell; Danny Janssen; Bobby Hart	2:19
4.	"It Sounds Like You're Saying Hello"	Terry Cashman; Tommy West	2:54
5.	"It's You"	Johnny Cymbal; Peggy Clinger	2:07

== Personnel ==
- John Bahler - vocal arrangement, background vocals
- Tom Bahler - background vocals
- Stan Farber - background vocals - uncredited (A6)
- Jerry Whitman - background vocals - uncredited (B2)
- Max Bennett - bass
- Hal Blaine - drums
- Dennis Budimir - guitar
- Larry Carlton - guitar
- David Cassidy - vocals
- Pete Ciccone - re-design
- Wes Farrell - rhythm arrangements
- Elliott Federman - mastering
- Mike Hartry - digital transfers
- Ron Hicklin - background vocals
- Jeremy Holiday - production coordination
- John Hudson - product manager
- Shirley Jones - vocals
- Larry Knechtel - keyboards
- Bob Kovach - engineer
- Mike Melvoin - string and horn arrangements, keyboards
- Joe Osborn - bass
- Rob Santos - re-issue producer
- Louie Shelton - guitar
- Lisa Sutton - liner notes
- Tommy Tedesco - guitar
- Jackie Ward - background vocals
- Beverly Weinstein - art direction
- Winston Wong - assistant engineer

Track information and credits adapted from AllMusic

== Releases ==
- CD Crossword Puzzle Buddha Records 2001
- CD Crossword Puzzle BMG Heritage 2003
- CD Crossword Puzzle Sbme Special Mkts. 2008
- CD Crossword Puzzle BMG Heritage

== Recording dates ==
4 September 1971

- "As Long As There's You"
- "Come On Love"

1 May 1972

- "One Day at a Time"
- "It Means I'm in Love with You" (see 23 May 1972)
- "It Sounds Like You're Saying Hello"
- "It's You"

23 May 1972

- "It Means I'm In Love With You" (Re-Record, see 1 May 1972)

4 September 1972

- "Sunshine"
- "Let Your Love Go"

22 September 1972

- "It's a Long Way to Heaven"
- "Now That You've Got Me Where You Want Me"
- "I've Got Your Love All Over Me"

See recording dates for this and other Partridge Family albums at The Partridge Family Recording Sessions

== Charts ==
Chart (1973)	Peak position
US Billboard 200	167
