= It's Now or Never (song) =

1960 single by Elvis Presley

- Original 45 picture sleeve

Single by Elvis Presley
- B-side: "A Mess of Blues"; "Make Me Know It" (UK)
- Released: July 5, 1960
- Recorded: April 3, 1960
- Studio: RCA Victor, Nashville
- Genre: Pop
- Length: 3:15
- Label: RCA Victor
- Songwriters: Wally Gold; Aaron Schroeder; Eduardo di Capua

Elvis Presley singles chronology
"Stuck on You" / "Fame and Fortune" (1960)	"It's Now or Never" (1960)	"Are You Lonesome Tonight?" (1960)

Audio
- "It's Now or Never" on YouTube

"It's Now or Never" is a song recorded by Elvis Presley and released as a single in 1960. The song is Presley's biggest hit, with 20 million copies sold worldwide, it is one of the best-selling singles of all time. It was recorded by Bill Porter at RCA Studio B in Nashville. It is written in E major and has a tempo of 80 BPM.

In 1960, "It's Now or Never" was a number-one record in the U.S. for Elvis Presley, spending five weeks at number one and the UK, where it spent eight weeks at the top in 1960 and an additional week at number one in 2005 as a re-issue, and numerous other countries, selling in excess of 20 million physical copies worldwide, Elvis Presley's biggest international single ever. Its British release was delayed for some time because of rights issues, allowing the song to build up massive advance orders and to enter the UK Singles Chart at number one, a very rare occurrence at the time. "It's Now or Never" peaked at number seven on the R&B charts.

== Background ==
"It's Now or Never" is one of two popular songs based on the Italian song of the Neapolitan language, "'O Sole mio" (music by Eduardo di Capua); the other is "There's No Tomorrow", recorded by U.S. singer Tony Martin in 1949, which inspired Presley's version. The lyrics were written by Aaron Schroeder and Wally Gold. The song was published by Elvis Presley's company Gladys Music, Inc.

In the late 1950s, while stationed in Germany with the U.S. Army, Presley heard Martin's recording. It is also likely that he was inspired to record this because of his fondness for Mario Lanza who had first popularized "'O Sole Mio" to American audiences and who had died the year before "It's Now or Never" was recorded. According to The New York Times, quoting from the 1986 book Behind the Hits, "he told the idea to his music publisher, Freddy Bienstock, who was visiting him in Germany... Mr. Bienstock, who many times found songwriters for Presley, returned to his New York City office, where he found songwriters, Mr. [Aaron] Schroeder and Wally Gold, the only people in that day. The two wrote lyrics in half an hour. Selling more than 5 million records, the song became number one in countries all around and was Presley's best selling single ever... a song [they] finished in 20 minutes to a half hour was the biggest song of [their] career."

Barry White credited this song as his inspiration for changing his life and becoming a singer following his release from prison. In the promotional video for the Beatles' 1968 single "Hey Jude", the members of the band jokingly perform a few lines of the song.

== Versions ==
A live version featuring "'O Sole mio" is available on the 1977 live album Elvis in Concert. "'O Sole mio" is sung by tenor Sherrill Nielsen, who was in The Imperials and later one of the collaborators of Elvis Presley.

In early 2005, the song was re-released along with the other Presley singles in the UK, and again reached number 1 on the UK Singles Chart for the week of 5 February 2005. The re-release held the record for the lowest selling number-one single in UK chart history until Orson's "No Tomorrow" in 2006. The song also appears in the TV miniseries Elvis, a 2005 CBS special.

In 2015, a new version of the song was recorded accompanied by new orchestral arrangement by the Royal Philharmonic Orchestra, and was released on their album of that year If I Can Dream.

== Chart performance ==
=== United States ===
"It's Now or Never" entered the US Billboard Hot 100 at No. 44 on July 18, 1960. After climbing to No. 14 and then a two-week stay at No. 3, the song climbed to No. 1 for a five-week stay, beginning August 15. In that same week, the B-side to the single, "A Mess of Blues", peaked at No. 32 independently. During its run at the top of the US charts, "It's Now or Never" kept "Walk, Don't Run" by the Ventures at No. 2 before succumbing to "The Twist" by Chubby Checker on September 19. Presley fell to No. 3, spending a further seven weeks inside the top 40 before dropping out on November 14 (the same week that his follow-up, "Are You Lonesome Tonight?", debuted on the chart). As an A-side, Presley's former bass player's group Bill Black Combo charted with their version of "Don't Be Cruel" around the same time.

=== United Kingdom ===
In the UK, the single gained an eventual release in late October 1960, following copyright discussions. It became the first song to enter the new Record Retailer charts at No. 1—later adopted as the UK Singles Chart. During an eight-week run at the top, Presley was held off strong competition from Shirley Bassey ("As Long As He Needs Me") and the Drifters ("Save the Last Dance for Me") before claiming the coveted Christmas number one for 1960. A week later, he was deposed by Cliff Richard and the Shadows' "I Love You". Presley dropped to No. 2 and would leave the top 10 as "Are You Lonesome Tonight?" began its ascent to No. 1. After 18 weeks, "It's Now or Never" left the UK top 40 on 15 March 1961. Due to the single's delayed UK release, "A Mess of Blues" had already attained A-side status and peaked at No. 2 on 21 September 1960.

"It's Now or Never" would be one of several songs to return to the UK top 40 in the wake of Presley's death, reaching No. 39 on 3 August 1977.

On 5 February 2005, the song returned to the top of the UK charts for one more week as part of a week-by-week reissue series of his former chart-toppers. This gave Presley his 21st UK number one single, his fourth of the new millennium. Overall, "It's Now or Never" has managed 22 weeks in the UK top 40.

== Charts ==
=== Weekly charts ===
Chart (1960–61)	Peak position
Australia (Kent Music Report)	1
Canada (CHUM Hit Parade)	1
Belgium (Ultratop 50 Flanders)	1
Germany (Der Musikmarkt)	1
Ireland (Evening Herald)	1
Netherlands (Single Top 100)	1
New Zealand (Lever Hit Parade)	1
Norway (VG-lista)	1
South Africa (Springbok)	1
Spain (Promusicae)	1
UK Singles (Official Charts)	1
US Billboard Hot 100	1
US Billboard Hot R&B Sides	7
US Singles (Cash Box)	1

Chart (1977)	Peak position
UK Singles (Official Charts)	39

Chart (2005)	Peak position
France (SNEP)	86
Ireland (IRMA)	6
Netherlands (Single Top 100)	58
Scottish Singles Sales (Official Charts)	1
Sweden (Sverigetopplistan)	47
UK Singles (Official Charts)	1

=== Year-end charts ===
Chart (1960)	Position
South Africa	1
Finland	1
US Billboard Hot 100	7
US Singles (Cash Box)	2
Chart (2005)	Position
UK Singles (Official Charts Company)	152

=== All-time charts ===
Chart (1958–2018)	Position
US Billboard Hot 100	118

Chart	Position
UK Singles (Official Charts Company)	76

== Sales and certifications ==
Region	Certification	Certified units/sales
Finland	—	31,000
Germany (BVMI)	Gold	1,000,000
Netherlands	—	160,000
Norway (IFPI Norway)	Silver	25,000
Sweden	—	100,000
United Kingdom (BPI) Physical sales	Gold	1,300,000
United Kingdom (BPI) Digital sales since 2004	Silver	200,000^{‡}
United States (RIAA)	Platinum	5,000,000
Summaries
Belgium, Holland & Luxembourg	—	200,000
^{‡} Sales+streaming figures based on certification alone.

== John Schneider version ==
"It's Now or Never"

Single by John Schneider

from the album Now or Never
- B-side: "Stay"
- Released: May 1981
- Genre: Country
- Length: 3:22
- Label: Scotti Brothers
- Songwriters: Wally Gold; Aaron Schroeder; Eduardo di Capua

John Schneider singles chronology
"It's Now or Never" (1981)	"Them Good Ol' Boys Are Bad" (1981)

American country music singer and actor John Schneider released in 1981 a cover of the song as his first single and the title track of his debut album It's Now or Never. Schneider's version was a top five hit on the Billboard Hot Country Singles chart and peaked at No. 14 on the Billboard Hot 100.

=== Chart performance ===
Chart (1981)	Peak position
Canadian RPM Country Tracks	7
Canadian RPM Adult Contemporary Tracks	5
New Zealand (RIANZ)	49
U.S. Billboard Hot 100	14
U.S. Billboard Hot Country Singles	4
U.S. Billboard Adult Contemporary	5

Year-end chart (1981)	Rank
US Top Pop Singles (Billboard)	82

== Uses in popular culture ==
An instrumental version is used in a scene from Masahiro Shinoda's 1964 film Pale Flower.

At the 20th anniversary concert of the Suntory Hall in Japan in 2006, Italian tenors Vincenzo La Scola and Giuseppe Sabbatini and American tenor Neil Shicoff sang a bilingual version of the song together. For their respective solo parts, the two Italians sang the original Neapolitan lyrics, while Shicoff sang two segments of "It's Now or Never"; and all three joined for the final chorus with the Neapolitan lyrics.

It also featured on the soundtrack of the 2009 feature film The Hangover, performed by El Vez.

== See also ==
- List of best-selling singles
- List of best-selling singles in Germany
- List of number-one hits in Norway
- List of Hot 100 number-one singles of 1960 (U.S.)
- List of number-one singles from the 1960s (UK)
- List of number-one singles from the 2000s (UK)
