= Twenty Four Hours from Tulsa =

Single by Gene Pitney

from the album Blue Gene
- B-side: "Lonely Night Dreams (Of Far Away Arms)"
- Released: October 1963
- Genre: Pop
- Length: 2:52
- Label: Musicor
- Songwriters: Burt Bacharach; Hal David
- Producers: Aaron Schroeder; Wally Gold

Gene Pitney singles chronology
"True Love Never Runs Smooth" (1963)	"Twenty Four Hours from Tulsa" (1963)	"That Girl Belongs to Yesterday" (1964)

"Twenty Four Hours from Tulsa" is a song written by Burt Bacharach and Hal David, and was originally a hit in 1963 for Gene Pitney.

== Production ==
The song's lyrics tell of a traveling man who detours to a romance in a motel and ends up never returning home. The twists of the song's lyrics (the protagonist, just 24 hours from reaching home, falls in love with a woman when he stops driving for the night, leaving his current partner twisting in the wind) are echoed in the music's tonal ambiguity, a common feature of Bacharach's constructivist style. The verse is in G major, with a lydian implication in the melody supported by the supertonic major. At the start of the chorus, an interruption of the expected cadence by the subdominant chord (C major) establishes this as the new tonic, with the remainder of the chorus centered around the submediant, dominant and subdominant chords of this key. A similar interruption at the end of the chorus converts an expected perfect cadence in the new key to a modal cadence back into G major. At the end of the song, a dominant seventh on the tonic resolves as a perfect cadence into a new key to finish the song on the subdominant chord of the principal key (C major as viewed from the perspective of a G major tonality).

== Chart performance ==
Its success in the UK, peaking at #5, enabled Pitney to become an international star. In the US, Pitney's hit peaked at #17 on the 7 December 1963 Hot 100 and #2 on the 6 December 1963 WLS Silver Dollar Survey.

== Cover versions ==
- Jay and the Americans covered the song on their 1963 album, At the Cafe Wha?
- Dusty Springfield covered it on her 1964 debut album A Girl Called Dusty.
- Canadian duo Ian & Sylvia covered this song on their 1965 album, Play One More.
- The O'Kaysions released a version of the song on their 1968 debut album, Girl Watcher and as a single in 1969.
- Canadian artist Tommy Graham's version reached #2 on the Canadian Country charts, March 13, 1971.
- It was covered by Yachts in 1980.
- It was covered by MEO 245 in 1981.
- Claire Hamill released a version of the song in 1983.
- Swedish singer Östen Warnerbring has made a Swedish version called "15 minuter från Eslöv" ("15 minutes from Eslöv").
- French singer and composer Claude François made the French version (tells a somewhat different story, though the spirit remains the same) Maman chérie (Lit. "my dear Mum"). In it, instead of telling his 'future ex-girlfriend' that he met someone else, he impersonates a man who's lived a life full of parties, fun, and met a girl, made mistakes, and is too ashamed to have not listened to his parents' advice, and just like in the original, he concludes that he'll "never, never, go home again" (je ne pourrai jamais, jamais, rentrer chez nous). The song is somewhat bleaker in its tone than the original, which is the inverse of what happened when Francois's own song "My Way" was translated; Paul Anka's English lyric for this has deeper meaning than the original French version.
- American singer and songwriter Timi Yuro covered the song, appearing on a 1995 compilation album.
- Mari Wilson covered the song on her 2016 album Pop Deluxe and features it in her live shows.
- Peacehaven & Telscombe F.C. Supporters covered it as Twenty Four Hours From Telscombe in 2016.
- Randy Barlow also covered the song with a country version in 1976-77.
- The comic radio drama Twenty Four Hours from Tulse Hill aired in 2018 on the BBC. The title is a pun on the close pronunciation of Tulsa with Tulse Hill ( a South London suburb).

== Influences ==
Less than two years later, Billy Joe Royal's "Down in the Boondocks" copied part of the arrangement of the tune.
