= Randy Barlow =

American country musician (1943–2020)

- Born: March 29, 1943; Detroit, Michigan, U.S.
- Died: July 30, 2020 (aged 77) Palmetto, Florida, U.S.
- Genres: Country
- Instrument: Vocals
- Years active: 1968–1983
- Labels: Gazelle; Republic; Paid; Jamex
- Website: www.randybarlow.net

Randy Barlow (March 29, 1943 – July 30, 2020) was an American country music recording artist. Between 1976 and 1983, he released four albums, including three for Republic Records. In the same time span, he charted twenty singles on the Billboard U.S. country charts, including a string of four songs in a row which all reached No. 10.

== Early life ==
Randy Barlow was born on March 29, 1943, in Detroit, Michigan to Hugh and Dessie Moore. Barlow began playing guitar at 6 years of age after receiving a toy guitar as a Christmas gift from his father. Later, the family relocated to the western Detroit suburb of Garden City, and Barlow's father Hugh went to work at General Motors' Willow Run Transmission plant, an experience Barlow would later immortalize in a charting single. In high school, Barlow played guitar in a local rock and roll band called The Royal Lancers. After high school, Barlow attended Western Kentucky University, where he and fellow students formed a band called E.A. Poe and the Ravens. It was during this period that he developed his musical style, and changed his last name to Barlow.

== Career ==
=== 1964–1975: Early career ===
In 1964, Barlow was offered a job as an emcee and road manager for Dick Clark's Caravan of Stars tour. One of his duties on this tour was driver and road manager for first-wave British invasion band Herman's Hermits. This experience gave Barlow his first taste of the touring life of a professional musician, and left him with a resolve to make a career for himself in music. In 1966, Barlow moved to California to seriously pursue a career as a recording artist. He spent the next few years playing clubs in southern California, and released his second single in 1968, "Color Blind", on the Mercury label, which did not chart. His first released single had been in 1967 on Jimmy Velvet's Velvet Tone label, "Listen To The Green Grass Grow".

=== 1976–1983: Recording career ===
In 1974, Barlow released a single on the Capitol label, "Throw Away the Pages", which made it into the Top 100 for country, followed by three more Top 100 songs in 1976. Barlow's big break came later in 1976, with a move to Nashville and the opportunity to record his second single, the Burt Bacharach/Hal David tune "Twenty Four Hours from Tulsa", which charted in the top 20 in 1977. This was followed by four top 10 country singles from 1977 to 1979: "Slow and Easy", "No Sleep Tonight", "Fall in Love with Me Tonight", and "Sweet Melinda", with Barlow garnering songwriting credits on the last 3 songs. The year 1979 brought a nomination for Best New Male Artist from the Academy of Country Music, and a television appearance on "Hee Haw" alongside Gene Autry and the Statler Brothers, during which Barlow sang "Sweet Melinda". Barlow toured nationally while releasing eight more singles and four albums in the period from 1976 to 1983, on the Republic label and later the Paid label. In 1981 his single, "Willow Run" reached #46 in the country music top 100.

=== 1984–2020: Later career and death ===
Barlow remained based in Nashville, where he continued to write songs and perform. In 2015, Barlow was inducted into the Traditional Country Music Hall of Fame. On August 20, 2016, Randy Barlow was inducted into the Michigan Country Music Hall of Fame in West Branch, Michigan.

Barlow died of cancer on July 30, 2020, at the age of 77.

== Awards ==
1979 Country Music Association Award (CMA) nominee for Best New Male Vocalist; Cash Box Magazine Country Album Award Winner, New Male Vocalist; Inductee, National Traditional Country Music Association Hall of Fame 2015.

== Discography ==
=== Albums ===
| Year | Album | Chart Positions | | Label |
| Year | Album | US Country | CAN Country | Label |
|---|---|---|---|---|
| 1977 | Arrival | — | — | Gazelle |
| 1978 | Fall in Love with Me | 26 | 21 | Republic |
| 1979 | Randy Barlow Featuring Sweet Melinda | 25 | — | Republic |
| 1981 | Dimensions | — | — | Paid |

=== Singles ===
| Year | Single | Chart Positions | | Album |
| Year | Single | US Country | CAN Country | Album |
|---|---|---|---|---|
| 1968 | "Color Blind" | — | — | Singles only |
| 1973 | "Likes to See a Big Man Cry" | — | — | Singles only |
| 1974 | "Throw Away the Pages" | 80 | — | Singles only |
| 1976 | "Johnny Orphan" | 74 | — | Singles only |
| 1976 | "Goodnight My Love" | 53 | — | Arrival |
| 1976 | "Lonely Eyes" | 46 | — | Arrival |
| 1976 | "Twenty-Four Hours from Tulsa" | 18 | — | Arrival |
| 1977 | "Kentucky Woman" | 26 | — | Arrival |
| 1977 | "California Lady" | 31 | — | Arrival |
| 1977 | "Walk Away with Me" | 48 | — | Arrival |
| 1978 | "Slow and Easy" | 10 | — | Fall in Love with Me |
| 1978 | "No Sleep Tonight" | 10 | 18 | Fall in Love with Me |
| 1979 | "Fall in Love with Me Tonight" | 10 | 11 | Fall in Love with Me |
| 1979 | "Sweet Melinda" | 10 | 14 | Randy Barlow Featuring Sweet Melinda |
| 1979 | "Another Easy Lovin' Night" | 25 | — | Randy Barlow Featuring Sweet Melinda |
| 1979 | "Lay Back in the Arms of Someone" | 13 | — | Randy Barlow Featuring Sweet Melinda |
| 1980 | "Willow Run" | 46 | — | Dimensions |
| 1981 | "Dixie Man" | 25 | — | Dimensions |
| 1981 | "Love Dies Hard" | 13 | — | Dimensions |
| 1981 | "Try Me" | 32 | — | Singles only |
| 1982 | "Love Was Born" | 30 | — | Singles only |
| 1983 | "Don't Leave Me Lonely Loving You" | 67 | — | Singles only |
