= (The Man Who Shot) Liberty Valance =

Single by Gene Pitney

from the album Only Love Can Break a Heart
- B-side: "Take It Like a Man"
- Released: 1962
- Genre: Rock and roll; country folk
- Length: 2:49
- Label: Musicor
- Songwriters: Burt Bacharach & Hal David

Gene Pitney singles chronology
"Town Without Pity" (1961)	"(The Man Who Shot) Liberty Valance" (1962)	"Only Love Can Break a Heart" (1962)

"(The Man Who Shot) Liberty Valance" is a song written by Burt Bacharach and Hal David, which was released by Gene Pitney in May 1962. It spent 13 weeks on the Billboard Hot 100 chart, peaking at No. 4, while reaching No. 2 on Canada's CHUM Hit Parade, and No. 4 on New Zealand's "Lever Hit Parade".

The song was not used in the film, The Man Who Shot Liberty Valance, and there is disagreement about whether that had ever been intended. Nevertheless, Pitney stated that the recording session was paid for by Paramount, and it was midway through the session that he found out the song would not be included in the film, when one of the orchestra members told him that the movie had been released already. Session drummer Gary Chester played on the recording.

The Pitney and the Jimmie Rodgers versions of the song are noted for a solo violin that plays in the upper register. Both versions are also noteworthy for the chorus, in which a quick half-second strike on the tympani is heard, depicting the gun shots:

"The man who shot Liberty Valance, (bong)
He shot Liberty Valance, (bong),
He was the bravest of them all".

The first verse describes the outlaw's intimidating presence and ability with a gun. The second focuses on the man who comes to town prepared to defeat Valance with the law alone. Later in the song, the law-book-toting hero falls in love with a girl who, when he is forced to confront Valance, waits alone and prays, knowing that: "When two men go and face (or "fight") each other, only one returns". With some exceptions, the lyrics generally parallel the film's plot. However, in the film, Ransom Stoddard, the lawyer thought to have shot Valance, did not remain in town because of "the love of a girl", but out of stubbornness. And although "the girl", Hallie, was attracted to Stoddard more than to her beau, Tom Doniphon, and worried about Stoddard facing Valance, she is never depicted praying for Stoddard or discouraging him from the fighting the duel.

The song was ranked No. 36 in the Western Writers of America's list of the top 100 Western songs of all time, as compiled from a survey of its members.

Jimmie Rodgers released a cover similar in form to the Gene Pitney version.

The Greg Kihn Band included their take on their 1980 album Glass House Rock. James Taylor recorded it for his 1985 album That's Why I'm Here.

== Chart performance ==
Chart (1962)	Peak position
Australia	1
Canada - CHUM Hit Parade	2
New Zealand - Lever Hit Parade	4
US Billboard Hot 100	4
