= Only Love Can Break a Heart =

Single by Gene Pitney

from the album Only Love Can Break a Heart
- B-side: "If I Didn't Have a Dime (To Play the Jukebox)"
- Released: September 1962
- Genre: Pop
- Length: 2:50
- Label: Musicor
- Songwriters: Hal David, Burt Bacharach
- Producers: Wally Gold, Aaron Schroeder

Gene Pitney singles chronology
"(The Man Who Shot) Liberty Valance" (1962)	"Only Love Can Break a Heart" (1962)	"Half Heaven – Half Heartache" (1962)

"Only Love Can Break a Heart" is a popular song from 1962, performed by the American singer-songwriter Gene Pitney. The song was written by Hal David (words) and Burt Bacharach (music) and appears on Pitney's second album Only Love Can Break a Heart.

== Gene Pitney version ==
Pitney had enjoyed some success as a songwriter prior to breaking through as a performer in his own right. He wrote the songs "Hello Mary Lou", "Rubber Ball", and "He's a Rebel", the last a number-one Billboard Hot 100 hit for The Crystals in 1962. Pitney's success as a singer was beginning at that time, and, on November 3, 1962, "He's a Rebel" kept "Only Love Can Break a Heart", Pitney's highest charting hit, at No. 2 for one week, from topping the Billboard Hot 100 chart. The song also spent two weeks at No. 1 on the Billboard Easy Listening chart in October and November 1962, while reaching No. 2 on New Zealand's "Lever Hit Parade". Pitney did his own whistling on the song.

=== Chart performance ===
Chart (1962)	Peak position
US Billboard Hot 100	2
US Billboard Easy Listening	1
New Zealand – "Lever Hit Parade"	2
Canada – CHUM Hit Parade	11
US Billboard R&B	16

== Country music versions ==
Country music singers Sonny James and Kenny Dale also recorded cover versions of "Only Love Can Break a Heart". Both versions reached the Top 10 on the Billboard Hot Country Singles chart during the 1970s. James' version peaked at No. 2 in March 1972, held out of the top by Freddie Hart's "My Hang-Up Is You." As a result, "Only Love ..." just missed continuing James' record-breaking streak of consecutive number-one singles, which had reached 16. Dale's version of the song reached number seven on the Hot Country Singles chart in 1979 and it was his biggest hit on the country charts.

== Other versions ==
Margaret Whiting charted with the song in 1967. Whiting's version reached No. 96 on the Billboard Hot 100 and No. 4 on Billboard's Easy Listening chart.

Bobby Vinton released the song in 1977, and it reached No. 99 on the Billboard Hot 100, while reaching No. 44 on Billboard's Easy Listening chart, and No. 50 on the RPM "Adult Oriented Playlist" in Canada. Vinton's version appears on his album The Name Is Love.

Dionne Warwick recorded the song in 1970 for Scepter Records as part of the sessions for Very Dionne, but the recording remained unreleased for several years. Scepter finally released her version of the song as a single in 1977, but it only reached No. 9 on the "Bubbling Under" portion of the Billboard Hot 100, as well as No. 46 on Billboard's Adult Contemporary Charts.

In 1999, Glen Campbell recorded the song on his album My Hits and Love Songs.

== See also ==
- List of number-one adult contemporary singles of 1962 (U.S.)
