= Half Heaven – Half Heartache =

Single by Gene Pitney

from the album Only Love Can Break a Heart
- B-side: "Tower-Tall"
- Released: 1962
- Genre: Pop
- Length: 2:45
- Label: Musicor
- Songwriters: Aaron Schroeder, Wally Gold & George Goehring

Gene Pitney singles chronology
"Only Love Can Break a Heart" (1962)	"Half Heaven – Half Heartache" (1962)	"Mecca" (1963)

"Half Heaven – Half Heartache" is a song released by Gene Pitney in 1962. The song spent 12 weeks on the Billboard Hot 100 chart, peaking at No. 12, while reaching No. 4 on Canada's CHUM Hit Parade, and No. 5 on Billboard's Middle-Road Singles chart.

== Chart performance ==
Chart (1963)	Peak position
US Billboard Hot 100	12
Canada - CHUM Hit Parade	4
US Billboard - Middle-Road Singles	5
Australia - Music Maker	6

== Cover versions ==
- In 1976, the horn-rock band Straight released a version of the song as a 7" 45-rpm single, with Back To The Music as the B-side.
- In 2000, Jane Olivor released a version of the song on her album Love Decides, featuring Gene Pitney singing harmony.
- In 2009, Rod MacDonald released a version of this song on his album After The War, featuring its composer, George Goehring playing piano.
