= Stateside Records =

- Parent company: Warner Music Group
- Founded: 1962
- Founder: Fred Oxon
- Distributor(s): Warner Records (US); Parlophone (UK); WEA International (Worldwide); Rhino Entertainment (Reissues)
- Genre: Various
- Country of origin: UK
- Official website: www.statesiderecords.com

Stateside 45rpm record. This Herb Alpert recording was originally released on A&M Records in the U.S.

Stateside Records, styled as $tateside Records, is a British record label, owned by Warner Music Group and operates through its Parlophone and Warner Records imprints. Upon creation, it initially released licensed American recordings and is now a reissue label.

== History ==
It was formed in 1962 by EMI as a replacement for the Top Rank label (originally the Rank Organisation's label), which had folded. EMI hired former Top Rank label head Fred Oxon to run it and compete with Decca's London "American Recordings", and Pye's "Pye International" labels.

While Top Rank's British acts (such as John Leyton) were assigned to EMI's Columbia and His Master's Voice labels, Stateside continued to issue records from its American suppliers, including Amy, Bell, 20th Century Fox, Scepter, Vee-Jay and A&M, and acquired Tamla-Motown-Gordy from Oriole Records.

Its first hit was "Palisades Park" by Freddy Cannon, which was licensed from Swan Records. It was through EMI's relationship with Vee-Jay and Swan that pre-1964 recordings by the Beatles were released by those labels in the U.S. when EMI's American subsidiary Capitol turned them down.

Stateside's black label design, with a large '45' for singles and a coloured logo for albums, was the model for the new-look Columbia, Parlophone and His Master's Voice labels which were introduced the following year. In the late 1960s, when EMI set up long term licence contracts with US labels like Motown, Bell and Dot, it no longer needed Stateside, and the label was retired quietly in 1973, along with EMI's Columbia, His Master's Voice, Regal Zonophone and Parlophone labels, in favour of the new EMI and EMI America labels. Stateside has retrospectively attracted interest from northern soul fans, mainly for its role in releasing American Motown recordings in the UK market. Stateside issued 45 of them, including the number 1 "Baby Love" in 1964, prior to the establishment of the UK Tamla Motown label.

In the 1980s, the Stateside label was revived as a catalogue reissue label, specialising in American recordings from Capitol Records and other labels EMI acquired over the years. The trademark is now owned by Parlophone Records Limited, as a consequence of the EU-mandated divestiture of some EMI Records assets to Warner Music Group. That forced the deletion of titles to which Capitol Records, now owned by Universal Music Group, had the rights. In the summer of 2017, Warner Music relaunched the Stateside label for classic jazz, soul and R&B releases.

== See also ==
- List of record labels
