= Town Without Pity (song) =

Song first recorded by Gene Pitney in 1961

Single by Gene Pitney

from the album Town Without Pity
- B-side: "Air Mail Special Delivery"
- Released: October 6, 1961
- Genre: pop
- Length: 2:53
- Label: Musicor
- Composer: Dimitri Tiomkin
- Lyricist: Ned Washington
- Producer: Aaron Schroeder

Town Without Pity is a song written by composer Dimitri Tiomkin and lyricist Ned Washington. The track, produced by Aaron Schroeder, was originally recorded by Gene Pitney for the 1961 film of the same title. In the US, the Gene Pitney recording went to #13 on the Hot 100.

This tragic song, in the key of B Minor, first ends the chorus in D Major, before going up a key in the refrain to C Minor, with the coda ending the song in the same minor key.

== Awards ==
In 1962, the song received a Golden Globe Award for Best Song and was nominated for an Academy Award for Best Song (losing to "Moon River" from Breakfast at Tiffany's).

== Other versions ==
Gene Pitney also recorded versions in German (lyrics by Frank Zieboltz), entitled "Bleibe bei mir" ("Stay With Me") and Italian, entitled "Città Spietata".

Rock Guitarist Ronnie Montrose released an instrumental cover of the song in 1978 with Edgar Winter producing. The American rock band Thin White Rope released the song on their 1988 album Red Sun. John Travolta and Kirstie Alley say the song in the 1989 romantic comedy Look Who's Talking! The Dickies, an American punk band from California, also included the song in their program in 1989 as did the band Stray Cats in 1990. American melodic guitarist Neil Zaza covered the song in 1993. Eddi Reader's version of Town Without Pity spent three weeks in the UK Singles Chart in 1996. She released the song on her album Candyfloss and Medicine. Country singer Mandy Barnett also recorded the song in 1999.

The American surf rock band Los Straitjackets from Nashville covered the song in 2004, and modern jazz alto saxophonist Richie Cole included Town Without Pity in his program in 2006. The Norwegian blues guitarist Vidar Busk also recorded the song in 2007. Lilli Passero released the song on her eponymous album in 2017.

Many artists and bands have recorded cover versions over the years since its release, including:

Year	Performer	Album
1966	Danny Williams	Only Love
1967	Herb Alpert & the Tijuana Brass	Sounds Like...
1978	Ronnie Montrose	Open Fire
1980	Paul Warren & Explorer	Takin' Her Back
1982	The Nylons	One Size Fits All
1987	Mathilde Santing	Out Of This Dream
1988	Thin White Rope	Red Sun
1989	The Dickies	Second Coming
1990	The Stray Cats	Let's Go Faster!
1992	Zen for Primates	Albatross
1992	Dave Vanian and the Phantom Chords	Town Without Pity (single)
1993	Neil Zaza	Thrills & Chills
1996	Eddi Reader	Candyfloss and Medicine
1996	The Brian Setzer Orchestra	Guitar Slinger
1999	Mandy Barnett	A Walk on the Moon (film soundtrack)
2001	Snakeman Show	Radio Snakeman Show, Vol. 1
2001	The Quiets	Take a flight with The Quiets
2004	Los Straitjackets	Play Favorites
2006	Richie Cole & The Alto Madness Orchestra	Risë's Rose Garden
2007	Vidar Busk & The Voo Doodz	Jookbox Charade

== Use in other media ==
- The song is used in a 1990 episode of Beverly Hills, 90210 in Season 1, Episode 3, "Every Dream Has Its Price (Tag)." It was only on the original broadcast and was since replaced on DVD and streaming.
- The song is used at the start of the 1996 film SubUrbia.
- In an early episode of Saturday Night Live (3/26/77), Laraine Newman played Indira Gandhi with John Belushi as her son Sanjay, who must vacate the premises after losing the election to Morarji Desai (Garrett Morris), but not before bursting into the song.
- The song is heard in the 1988 film, Hairspray.
- Jess Harnell covered the song for the 1988 film, Elvira: Mistress of the Dark.
- The song was also sung by John Travolta to Kirstie Alley in the 1989 romantic comedy, Look Who's Talking.
- The lyrics are referenced by Foetus (James Thirwell) in the song, "Descent into the Inferno".
- The song was also performed by The Voice season 12 finalist Lilli Passero on the May 1, 2017 episode.
- The song can be heard in the series Cold Case in Season 1, Episode 7, "A Time to Hate."
- The song can be heard in the series The Man in The High Castle in Season 1, Episode 9, "Kindness."
