= Gene Pitney =

American singer and songwriter (1940–2006)

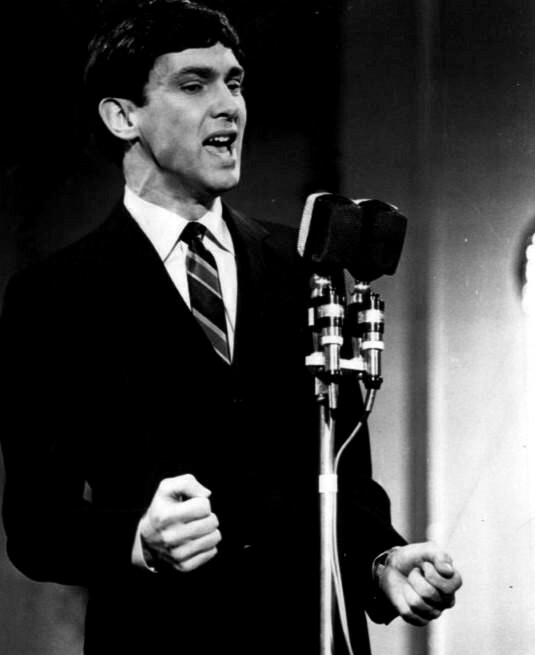
- Pitney in 1967

Background information
- Also known as: Billy Bryan
- Born: Gene Francis Alan Pitney; February 17, 1940; Hartford, Connecticut, U.S.
- Origin: Rockville, Connecticut, U.S.
- Died: April 5, 2006 (aged 66) Cardiff, Wales
- Genres: Pop; country
- Occupations: Singer; songwriter; musician
- Instruments: Vocals; guitar; piano; drums
- Years active: 1958–2006
- Labels: Musicor; Epic; Columbia; His Master's Voice

Gene Francis Alan Pitney (February 17, 1940 – April 5, 2006) was an American singer, songwriter and musician known predominantly for emotive, dramatic ballads heightened by an expansive range and sorrowful vocals. He also recorded country music. Between 1961 and 1968 Pitney charted with 16 Top 40 hits on Billboard's Hot 100, including four Top Tens. Between 1961 and 1974 in the United Kingdom he charted with 21 Top 40 solo hits, ten of them Top Ten. In 1989, in a collaboration with Marc Almond, he reached number one in the UK singles chart with an updated duet version of his 1967 UK hit "Something's Gotten Hold of My Heart". Pitney also charted strongly in Australia, including a mid-1970s comeback.

Pitney's most famous recordings include "Town Without Pity", "It Hurts to Be in Love", "I'm Gonna Be Strong" (his one transatlantic Top Ten: US no. 9/UK no. 2), "Half Heaven – Half Heartache", "Mecca" and four Bacharach/David songs: "(The Man Who Shot) Liberty Valance", "Only Love Can Break a Heart", "True Love Never Runs Smooth" and "Twenty Four Hours from Tulsa" (US no. 17/UK no. 5), the latter of which has emerged as his signature song. Plus the 1968 North American one-hit-comeback single "She's a Heartbreaker". Eight of his solo UK Top Tens — including "Looking Through the Eyes of Love" (US no. 28/UK no. 3) and "Nobody Needs Your Love" (UK no. 2) — either were minor hits or failed to chart in the States.

His songwriting credits include "(I Wanna) Love My Life Away" — his own 1961 chart debut (US no. 39) — and the Crystals' 1962 US number-one hit "He's a Rebel". He co-wrote two international hits that reached the US Top Ten: Bobby Vee's "Rubber Ball" (1960) and Ricky Nelson's "Hello Mary Lou" (1961).

In 2002 Pitney was inducted into the Rock and Roll Hall of Fame.

== Early years ==
Pitney was born in Hartford, Connecticut, United States, on February 17, 1940, as the son of Anna A., née Orlowski, and Harold F. Pitney. The third of five children of a lathe operator, Pitney lived with his family in Rockville, Connecticut (now part of Vernon) during his formative years.

Pitney's early influences were Clyde McPhatter, and doo-wop groups such as The Crows. He attended Rockville High School where he formed his first band, Gene & the Genials. Gene's first recordings were in 1958 with a Connecticut singing group called the Embers. Those recordings were not released until 1990. In early 1959, he released two records on the Decca label, "Snuggle Up Baby" and "Classical Rock and Roll", as part of a duo called Jamie and Jane with Ginny Arnell. Later that year, he had his first solo release "Cradle Of My Arms" under the name Billy Bryan on the Blaze record label. His first release under his real name was in 1960 on the Festival label titled "I'll Find You".

== Career ==
=== Rise to fame (1961–1964) ===
Signed to songwriter Aaron Schroeder's newly formed Musicor label in 1961, Pitney scored his first chart single, which made the Top 40, the self-penned "(I Wanna) Love My Life Away", on which he played several instruments and multi-tracked the vocals. He followed that same year with his first Top 20 single, "Town Without Pity", from the 1961 film of the same title. Written by Dimitri Tiomkin and Ned Washington, the song won a Golden Globe Award and was nominated for an Academy Award for Best Song, but lost to "Moon River". Pitney performed the song at the Oscars ceremony on April 9, 1962.

He is also remembered for the Burt Bacharach–Hal David song "(The Man Who Shot) Liberty Valance", which peaked at no. 4 in 1962. Though it shares a title with the John Wayne western, the song was not used in the film because of a publishing dispute.

Meanwhile, Pitney wrote hits for others, including "Today's Teardrops" for Roy Orbison, "Rubber Ball" for Bobby Vee, "Hello Mary Lou" for Ricky Nelson, and "He's a Rebel" for the Crystals (later recorded by Vikki Carr and Elkie Brooks). "Rebel" kept Pitney's own no. 2 hit "Only Love Can Break a Heart", his highest-charting single in the US, from the top spot on 3 November 1962, the only time that a writer shut himself (or herself) out of the number-one position.

He followed up in December with "Half Heaven, Half Heartache", which reached no. 12 on the Billboard chart. Because of his success on the music charts, and as he explained to his friend, oldies DJ 'Wild' Wayne, an unknown radio disc jockey at the time gave Pitney the nickname 'The Rockville Rocket', which caught on.

Pitney's popularity in the UK market was ensured by the breakthrough success of "Twenty Four Hours from Tulsa", a Bacharach and David song, which peaked at no. 5 in Britain at the start of 1964. It was only Pitney's third single release in the UK to reach the singles chart, and the first to break into the Top Twenty there; it was also a hit in the US, peaking at no. 17 on the Hot 100.

=== Involvement with the Rolling Stones (1964) ===
Pitney was present with Phil Spector at some of the Rolling Stones' early recording sessions in London, including "Little by Little" and other tracks for their debut album; he played piano, though the extent of this is uncertain.

The song "That Girl Belongs to Yesterday" was the very first Jagger/Richards composition to make the American music charts and also was a no. 7 UK hit for Pitney in 1964. It was the first song composed by the Rolling Stones duo to become a Top 10 hit in the UK. In the US, the single stalled at no. 49, ending a run of seven Top 40 singles for Pitney as a performer.

=== Maintaining popularity ===
After another low-charting single, 1964's "Yesterday's Hero", Pitney rebounded with another string of hits in the mid-1960s, including the 1964 singles "It Hurts to Be in Love" and "I'm Gonna Be Strong", which reached no. 7 and no. 9, respectively, in the US, and 1966's "Nobody Needs Your Love", which peaked at no. 2 in the UK, matching the no. 2 UK peak of "I'm Gonna Be Strong". "It Hurts to Be in Love" had been planned for and recorded by Neil Sedaka, but RCA refused to release it because Sedaka had recorded the song outside RCA Victor in violation of his contract. The writers, Howard Greenfield and Helen Miller, presented the song to Pitney. Miller replaced Sedaka's voice with Pitney's, though Sedaka's trademark backing harmonies were left intact.

In 1965, Pitney recorded two successful albums with country singer George Jones. They were voted the most promising country-and-western duo of the year. Pitney also recorded songs in Italian, Spanish, and German and twice finished second in Italy's prestigious annual Sanremo Music Festival, where his strong vibrato reminded older listeners of the Italian tenor Enrico Caruso. He had a regional hit with "Nessuno mi può giudicare".

Pitney's career in the US took a downturn after mid-1966, when "Backstage" ended another run of Top 40 hits. He returned one last time to the Top 40 in April 1968 with "She's a Heartbreaker" (no. 16) and placed several singles in the lower reaches of the Hot 100 after that, but by 1970 he was no longer a hit-maker in the United States.

=== UK, Australian and European stardom (1966–1970s) ===
Pitney maintained a successful career in Britain and the rest of Europe into the 1970s, appearing regularly on UK charts as late as 1974. UK pianist Maurice Merry was his musical director from 1970 onward. In Australia, after a fallow period in the early 1970s, Pitney returned to the Top 40 in 1974, when both "Blue Angel" (no. 2) and "Trans-Canada Highway" (no. 14; production by David Mackay) were substantial hits. Pitney continued to place records in the Australian charts through 1976, including the hit "Down This Road", written and produced by distant relative Edward Pitney. They also collaborated in the production of the hit song "Days of Summer".

In the early 1970s, Pitney decided to spend only six months each year on the road in order to spend more time with his family.

=== Later career ===
Pitney's last hit on the UK charts came in 1989, after an absence of 15 years, when he and Soft Cell singer Marc Almond recorded a duet version of "Something's Gotten Hold of My Heart" by British writers Roger Cook and Roger Greenaway. The song had been a UK no. 5 for Pitney in 1967. The duet brought him his first UK number one, in late January 1989. The single remained at the top for four weeks, and also went to number one in Germany, Finland, Switzerland and Ireland. Pitney and Almond appeared on several episodes of Top of the Pops and the Terry Wogan television show in Britain.

In 2000, Pitney sang harmony vocals on Jane Olivor's recording of his 1962 hit "Half Heaven – Half Heartache", which was released on her 'comeback' album Love Decides.

On 18 March 2002, Pitney was inducted by singer Darlene Love into the Rock and Roll Hall of Fame.

==== This Morning incident ====
Pitney was involved in a gaffe on ITV's This Morning in 1989, owing to a "technical mishap". Giving a performance of his track "You're the Reason", Pitney missed his cue and was seen "failing dismally to mime along in time to his backing track"; he continued with the song, and found humor in the incident. It has been repeated on television over the years, notably on a 2002 episode of BBC One series Room 101, in which host Paul Merton described it as a "very funny moment" in which Pitney came in "unbearably late". It was re-aired on the 25th anniversary edition of This Morning in 2013, in which presenter Holly Willoughby "broke out into a cold sweat" while reliving the moment.

== Personal life ==
During his England tour in 1963–64, Pitney had befriended the Rolling Stones, which resulted in his attending and taking part in their recording sessions in London.

In this way he met Marianne Faithfull who was entering the music scene of which the Rolling Stones were a part. Their relationship ended with an abortion early in 1965, after she became pregnant by Pitney on a United Kingdom tour.

At that point Faithfull was 18 and Pitney was around 25 years old. Abortions were still illegal in the United Kingdom at the time and Marianne later stated that she had a hard time dealing with the guilt.

At the height of his fame in 1967, Pitney married his childhood sweetheart, Lynne Gayton, and the couple had three sons, Todd, Christopher, and David.

=== Death ===
On April 5, 2006, while on tour in the UK, Pitney was found dead by his manager in a hotel room in Cardiff, Wales. An autopsy found the cause of death to be a heart attack and that he had severely occluded coronary arteries. His final show at Cardiff's St David's Hall, which earned him a standing ovation, ended with "Town Without Pity". He was buried at Somers Center Cemetery in Somers, Connecticut.

== Posthumous tributes ==
Marc Almond recorded "Backstage (I'm Lonely)" for his 2007 covers album Stardom Road.

On September 20, 2007, a plaque to Pitney was unveiled at the town hall in his hometown of Rockville, Connecticut. Members of his family attended. The event was emceed by Oldies Radio DJ and Pitney friend "Wild" Wayne. Governor Jodi Rell also declared September 20, 2007, as Gene Pitney Day in the state of Connecticut. The Gene Pitney Commemorative Committee established a music scholarship in Pitney's name. It is awarded annually to a Rockville High School student. In October 2008, an international fan convention was held in Rockville.

== Discography ==
=== Albums ===
- The Many Sides of Gene Pitney (1962)
- Spotlight on Gene Pitney & NewCastle Trio (1962)
- Only Love Can Break a Heart (1962)
- Gene Pitney Sings Just for You (1963)
- Gene Pitney Sings World Wide Winners (1963)
- Blue Gene (1963)
- Gene Pitney Meets the Fair Young Ladies of Folkland^{[A]} (1964)
- Gene Pitney's Big Sixteen (1964)
- Gene Italiano (1964)
- It Hurts to Be in Love and Eleven More Hit Songs^{[B]} (1964)
- Gene Pitney's Big Sixteen, Volume Two^{[C]} (1965)
- For the First Time! Two Great Stars - George Jones and Gene Pitney (1965)
- I Must Be Seeing Things^{[D]} (1965)
- It's Country Time Again! (with George Jones) (1965)
- Looking Through the Eyes of Love^{[E]} (1965)
- The Great Songs of Our Time (1965) Stateside SL 10156
- Español (1966)
- Being Together (with Melba Montgomery) (1966)
- Big Sixteen Volume 3 (1966)-
- Backstage (I'm Lonely)^{[F]} (1966)
- Nessuno Mi Può Giudicare (1966)
- Greatest Hits of All Times (1966)
- The Country Side of Gene Pitney (1966)
- Young and Warm and Wonderful (1966)
- Just One Smile (1967)
- Golden Greats (1967)
- The Gene Pitney Story (1968)
- Español, Volume 2 (1968)
- Gene Pitney Sings Burt Bacharach and Others (1968)
- She's a Heartbreaker^{[G]} (1968)
- The Greatest Hits of Gene Pitney (1969)
- This is Gene Pitney Singing The Platters' Golden Platters (1970)
- Super Star^{[H]} (1970)
- Ten Years Later (1971)
- New Sounds of Gene Pitney (1972)
- The Golden Hits of Gene Pitney (1972)
- Pitney '75 (1975)
- Backstage: The Greatest Hits and More (1990)
- You're The Reason (1990)
- Anthology(1961–1968) (1990)
- Hits and Misses (1993)
- Heartbreaker (1994)
- George Jones & Gene Pitney (1994)
- More Greatest Hits (1995)
- Greatest Hits (1995)
- Great Gene Pitney (1996)
- Very Best of Gene Pitney (1997)
- 22 Greatest Hits (1998)
- 25 All-Time Greatest Hits (1999)
- Defenitive Collection (1999)
- Many Sides of Gene Pitney/Only Love Can Break a Heart (1999) (2010)
- Looking Through (Ultimate Collection) (2001)
- His Golden Classics (2001)
- I'm Gonna be Strong (2002)
- Blue Angel: The Bronze Sessions (2003)
- Something's Gotten Hold of My Heart (2003)
- Street Called Hope (2004)
- Big Twenty: All the UK Top Hits, 1961-1973 (2004)
- Love Grows (2005)
- 24 Hours From Tulsa (2005)
- Something's Gotten Hold of My Heart (2005)
- Platinum Collection (2007)
- Best of Gene Pitney (2008)
- Sings Just For You/World Wide Winners (2011)
- Country Side of Gene Pitney (2012)
- Blue Gene/Meets the Fair Young Ladies of Folkland (2013)
- I'm Gonna be Strong/Looking Thru the Eyes of Love (2013)
- Cradle of My Arms: Complete Gene Pitney (2013)
- The Collection: The Original Musicor Master Tapes (2018)

=== Songwriting credits ===
- "A Chance to Belong", originally recorded by Carl Dobkins Jr., 1961.
- "Across the Street (Is a Million Miles Away)", originally recorded by Ray Peterson, 1964.
- "Bandit of My Dreams", written with Aaron Schroeder. Originally recorded by Eddie Hodges, December 1961.
- "Harmony", originally recorded by Billy Bland, September 1960.
- "He's a Rebel", originally recorded by The Blossoms, July 13, 1962.
- "(I Wanna) Love My Life Away", recorded by Gene Pitney, November 1960.
- "Louisiana Mama", recorded by Gene Pitney, November 1960.
- "Marianne", recorded by Gene Pitney, December 1964.
- "Mr Moon, Mr Cupid and I", recorded by Gene Pitney, July 1961.
- "Rubber Ball", co-written with Aaron Schroeder, originally recorded by Bobby Vee, November 7, 1960.
- "Today's Teardrops", co-written with Aaron Schroeder. Originally recorded with Roy Orbison and Bob Moore's Orch. & Chorus, August 8, 1960.
- "Twenty-Two Days", originally recorded by Roy Orbison, September 17, 1960.

Notes

^{A} Originally released as Dedicated to My Teen Queens
^{B–H} Released in the UK as: B. I'm Gonna Be Strong, C. Gene Pitney More Big Sixteen, D. Looking Through the Eyes of Love, E. Sings the Great Songs of Our Time, F. Nobody Needs Your Love, G. Pitney Today, H. Ten Years Later

=== Singles ===
Note that release dates refer to initial release. Pitney's early singles generally appeared one to four months later in the UK/Australia. Many of his later releases are UK/Australia/NZ only.

Year	Month	Title	Chart positions				
Year	Month	Title	AUS	CA	UK	US	US Country
1959		"Snuggle Up Baby" (with Ginny Arnell as Jamie and Jane)					
1959		"Classical Rock And Roll" (with Ginny Arnell as Jamie and Jane)					
1960		"Cradle of My Arms" (as Billy Bryan)					
1960		"Going Back to My Love"					
1960		"I'll Find You" (as Gene Pitney)					
1960		"Please Come Back"					
1961	January	"(I Wanna) Love My Life Away"	29	23	26	39	
1961	April	"Louisiana Mama"					
1961	July	"Every Breath I Take"				42	
1961	October	"Town Without Pity"	31	10	32	13	
1962	April	"(The Man Who Shot) Liberty Valance"	3	2		4	
1962	August	"Only Love Can Break a Heart" (A-side, vocals and whistling)	4	11		2	
1962	August	→ "If I Didn't Have a Dime (To Play the Jukebox)" (B-side)	4	42		58	
1962	December	"Half Heaven – Half Heartache"	11	4		12	
1963	March	"Mecca" (A-side)	7	2		12	
1963	March	→ "Teardrop by Teardrop " (B-side)	7			130	
1963	June	"True Love Never Runs Smooth"	18	17		21	
1963	October	"Twenty Four Hours from Tulsa"	3	6	5	17	
1964	January	"That Girl Belongs to Yesterday" (A-side)	9	41	7	49	
1964	January	→ "Who Needs It" (B-side)	9	41		131	
1964	April	"Yesterday's Hero" (A-side)	18	36		64	
1964	April	→ "Cornflower Blue" (B-side)	18				
1964	July	"It Hurts to Be in Love"	6	2	36	7	
1964	July	"Lips Are Redder on You" (Australia-only release)	83				
1964	October	"I'm Gonna Be Strong"	5	3	2	9	
1965	February	"I Must Be Seeing Things" (A-side)	12	6	6	31	
1965	February	→ "Marianne" (B-side)	12				
1965	April	"I've Got Five Dollars and It's Saturday Night" (with George Jones as George & Gene)	65			99	16
1965	May	"Last Chance to Turn Around"	13	4		13	
1965	June	"Louisiana Man" (A-side) (with George Jones as George & Gene)					25
1965	June	→ "I'm a Fool to Care" (B-side) (with George Jones as George & Gene)				115	
1965	July	"Looking Through the Eyes of Love"	34	3	3	28	
1965	November	"Princess in Rags"	13	2	9	37	
1965	November	"Big Job" (with George Jones as George & Gene)					50
1966	January	"Baby Ain't That Fine" (with Melba Montgomery)					15
1966	March	"Nessuno Mi Puo' Giudicare"	30			115	
1966	April	"Backstage"	29	2	4	25	
1966	May	"That's All It Took" (with George Jones as George & Gene)					47
1966	June	"Nobody Needs Your Love" (Europe-only release)			2		
1966	July?	"Being Together" (with Melba Montgomery)					
1966	September	"(In the) Cold Light of Day" (A-side)	19		38	115	
1966	September	→ "The Boss's Daughter" (B-side)	19				
1966	December	"Just One Smile" (A-side)	55	51	8	64	
1966	December	→ "Innamorata" (B-side)	55				
1967	March	"I'm Gonna Listen to Me"					
1967	March	"Animal Crackers (In Cellophane Boxes)"	87			106	
1967	April	"Tremblin'"					
1967	September	"Something's Gotten Hold of My Heart"	69		5	130	
1968	March	"The More I Saw of Her"					
1968	March	"Somewhere in the Country" (Europe-only release)			19		
1968	April	"She's a Heartbreaker"	39	13		16	
1968	June	"Love grows" (Europe-only release)					
1968	October	"Billy, You're My Friend"	31	92		92	
1968	November	"Yours Until Tomorrow" (Europe-only release)			34		
1969	March	"Maria Elena" (Europe-only release)			25		
1969	August	"Playing Games of Love"	85				
1969	December	"She Lets Her Hair Down (Early in the Morning)"		88		89	
1970	March	"A Street Called Hope"			37		
1970	October	"Shady Lady"			29		
1971		"Higher and Higher"					
1971		"Gene Are You There?"					
1972		"I Just Can't Help Myself"					
1972		"Summertime Dreamin'"					
1973	April	"24 Sycamore" (Europe-only release)			34		
1974	October	"Blue Angel" (Europe/Australia-only release)	2		39		
1975	March	"Trans-Canada Highway" (Europe/Australia-only release)	14				
1977		"It's Over / It's Over" A medley of two songs with the same title, the first by Roy Orbison, the second by Jimmie Rodgers					
1977		"Dedication"					
1989	January	"Something's Gotten Hold of My Heart" (with Marc Almond) (Europe/Australia-only release)	24		1		

Sources include Joel Whitburn's Record Research material for the US Top 100, "Bubbling Under" and US Country charts; Tim Rice et al., Guinness Book of Hit Singles for the UK; CHUM Chart for Canada prior to mid-1964, and the Canadian RPM charts thereafter; and The Kent Report for Australia
