= Wally Gold =

American singer

Wally Gold (May 15, 1928 – June 7, 1998) was an American musician, singer, songwriter, record producer, and music business executive from Teaneck, New Jersey.

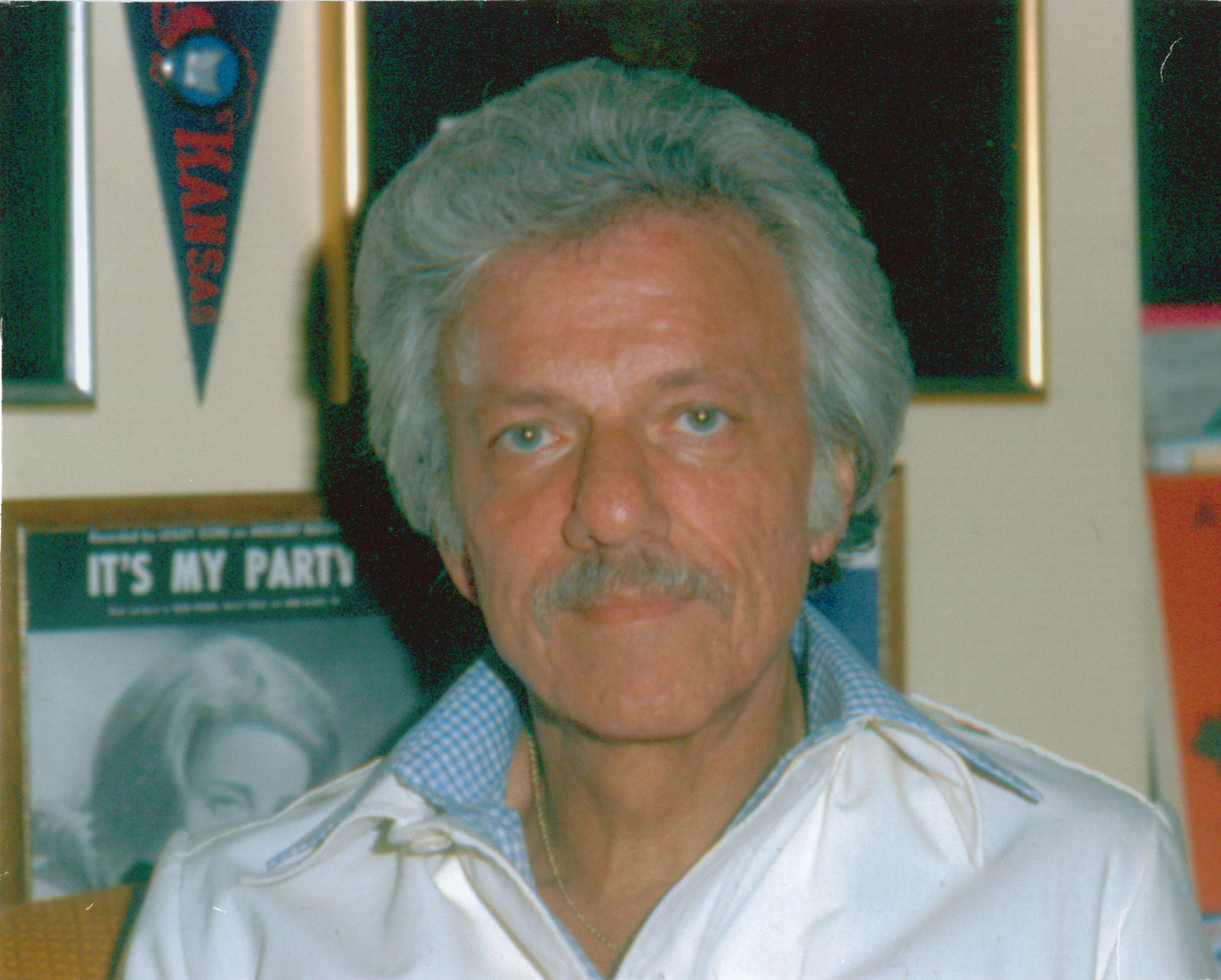
Wally Gold in his office at Kirshner around 1981

== Personal life ==
Gold was born in Brooklyn, New York, United States. Gold moved to Teaneck, New Jersey with his wife Fredda and two young sons and was soon joined by the addition of his daughter. He had five grandchildren.

== Career ==
Gold first performed as a saxophone player in the U.S. Navy band during World War II. After returning from Japan, he started college at Boston University where he formed the singing group The Four Esquires. Gold toured with The Four Esquires in the late 1950s and had two hit singles "Love Me Forever" and "Hideaway". They also appeared on The Patty Page Show and The Ed Sullivan Show.

By 1960, Gold joined Aaron Schroeder with whom he co-wrote two Elvis Presley Number 1 hits – "It's Now or Never" (1960) and "Good Luck Charm" (1962). During this period, Gold also co-wrote Lesley Gore's number 1 hit "It's My Party". Gold's songs have been recorded by scores of artists, including Duane Eddy's "Because They're Young" which peaked at #4, Gene Pitney's "Half Heaven – Half Heartache" (#12) and "Take Me Tonight", Nat King Cole's "Time and the River", as well as by Paul Petersen and Pat Boone. Gold has a total of 81 songs credited in the ASCAP database.

By the mid-1960s, Gold was hired as a house producer for Columbia Records, where he produced albums for Tony Bennett and Jerry Vale, and Barbra Streisand's 1969 album "What About Today?".

In the 1970s, Gold moved over to work as Vice President/general manager for Don Kirshner's music organization, where he discovered and produced the band Kansas. He worked on other successful projects as well, including a TV game show called Musical Chairs (1975) and a TV comedy A Year at the Top (1977) (uncredited) starring Paul Shaffer and Greg Evigan. He also served as Musical Coordinator for the Rock Concert TV series.

After leaving the music business, Gold worked as a travel agent until his death from colitis in 1998 at the age of 70.
