= Aaron Schroeder =

American songwriter and music publisher (1926–2009)

- Born: Aaron Harold Schroeder; September 7, 1926; Brooklyn, New York, U.S.
- Died: December 2, 2009 (aged 83); Englewood, New Jersey, U.S.
- Occupations: Songwriter, music publisher
- Spouse: Abby Steinberg (m. 1967)
- Relatives: David Steinberg (brother-in-law)

Aaron Harold Schroeder (September 7, 1926 – December 2, 2009) was an American songwriter and music publisher.

== Biography ==
Born in Brooklyn, Schroeder graduated from the school now known as the Fiorello H. LaGuardia High School of Music & Art and Performing Arts in New York City.

=== Songwriter ===
Having become an ASCAP member in 1948, Schroeder had his first success with "At a Sidewalk Penny Arcade", one of the songs to introduce Rosemary Clooney as a solo recording artist. He proceeded to write more than 1,500 songs seeking the varied talent of many collaborators. His chart record in the United Kingdom, as a writer, is 27 hits, 3 number ones, 9 top tens and 225 weeks on the chart.

He wrote seventeen songs for Elvis Presley including five that reached number one:

- "A Big Hunk o' Love"
- "Good Luck Charm"
- "I Got Stung"
- "Stuck on You"
- "It's Now or Never"

"It's Now or Never" as recorded by Presley was selected as number 75 in Billboard Magazine's top 100 songs on their 100th-anniversary "Greatest Hits Chart". In an interview with Jan-Erik Kjeseth he said that he was in fact present when Elvis recorded the song. He was very impressed with Presley's attitude: "Elvis wanted everything to be right; almost to the point of having tears in his eyes because he—Elvis—felt himself to be struggling to get the result that he envisaged in his head."

Schroeder had more than 500 song recordings to his credit, including major records by dozens of artists such as Roy Orbison, Duane Eddy, Sammy Davis Jr., Nat King Cole, Perry Como, Frank Gari, Gene Pitney, and Pat Boone. In the above-mentioned interview Schroeder said that he had in fact also participated in finalizing the hit song "It's My Party" (Lesley Gore). Together with his regular partner at the time, Wally Gold, he made corrections to an unfinished piece of material that another writer had brought in. When the work was done, Gold and Schroeder tossed a coin as to whose name should be listed among the credits. Schroeder "lost". Schroeder made a cameo appearance in the 1957 Warner Bros. rock and roll film, Jamboree, as a songwriter. Schroeder also once appeared on the CBS television game show To Tell The Truth along with two imposters during the show's fifth season. All 4 panelists, Johnny Carson, Kitty Carlisle, Don Ameche and Polly Bergen guessed the wrong contestant, and the 3 contestants split the $1,000.00 prize money.

=== Record producer ===
In the early 1960s, Schroeder was founder and president of Musicor Records. He discovered, managed and directed the career of Gene Pitney and produced "Town Without Pity", a nominee for the Academy Award for Best Song of 1961. He wrote one of Pitney's biggest hits, "Half Heaven, Half Heartache" and with Hal David and Burt Bacharach he conceived the marriage of the Pitney sound with David and Bacharach's songs, producing a string of record successes including "(The Man Who Shot) Liberty Valance", "Only Love Can Break a Heart" and "24 Hours from Tulsa".

He and his wife Abby, discovered, guided and developed careers of many other performers and composers through their agency, including Barry White, Randy Newman, Al Kooper, Blood, Sweat & Tears, and Jimi Hendrix.

=== Personal life ===
Schroeder married record company representative Abby Steinberg on October 31, 1967. Abby was the sister of PR Newswire president David Steinberg.

Aaron Schroeder died on December 2, 2009, in Englewood, New Jersey, aged 83. For the last five years, he was a resident of the Lillian Booth Actors' Home of the Actors Fund in Englewood. His death came after a long battle with primary progressive aphasia, a rare form of dementia.

== Sources ==
- Untold Gold (The Stories Behind Elvis's #1 Hits), by Ace Collins (2005; Chicago Review Press Inc.)
- Writing for the King, by Ken Sharp (2006), Follow That Dream Records and Sony/BMG of Denmark
- Elvis - his Life from A to Z, by Fred Worth and Steve Tamerius, Wings Books
- Harper's Bazaar, April 1961 issue
- Berkshire Magazine Spring, 1993 issue
- Billboard's 100th Anniversary Edition, published in 1994
- Billboard's 50th Anniversary of The Hot 100 Edition, published in 2008
- Billboard September 24, 1977, issue ("Schroeder Firms Go To Interworld")
- Record World, May 8, 1976, issue ("Schroeder Celebrates 28th Industry Anniversary")
- Cash Box, October 1, 1977, issue ("Interworld buys A. Schroeder Publisher")
