= Musicor Records =

American record label (1960–1976)

Musicor Record
- Founded: 1960
- Founder: Aaron Schroeder
- Defunct: 1976
- Status: Defunct (catalog owned by Gusto Records)
- Distributors: United Artists Records (1960–1964); Independent (1964–1970); RCA Records (1970–1976)
- Genre: Pop, country, Latin, R&B, gospel
- Country of origin: United States
- Location: New York City, New York

Musicor Records was a New York City-based record label, active from 1960 to 1976 . The label was founded by songwriter Aaron Schroeder and distributed by United Artists Records. In 1965, UA employee and A&R man Arthur Talmadge (a co-founder of Mercury Records years earlier) started his own Talmadge Productions company and, along with fellow UA employee/A&R man Harold "Pappy" Daily, bought the Musicor label from UA.

In 1976, Art Talmadge sold Musicor to Springboard International Records. When Springboard went bankrupt, Gusto Records acquired the Musicor catalog in 1984, along with the Scepter and Wand catalogs. The Musicor catalog remains owned by Gusto Records today.

== Subsidiary and reissue labels ==
After Art Talmadge bought the Musicor label, he formed two budget subsidiary labels (MusicVoice and Music Disc/MusicO) as well as two short-lived commercial subsidiaries, Ariel and Dynamo. Reissued singles were released under the Musicor Startime Series label.

== Best-selling artists ==
Musicor's best-selling artists ran the gamut of genres. The label's most successful artist was pop star Gene Pitney, who gave Musicor its biggest hits with "It Hurts to Be in Love" and "Only Love Can Break a Heart". Bert Berns produced Jimmy Radcliffe's recording of the Burt Bacharach and Hal David song "Long After Tonight Is All Over" in 1964 that proved to be one of Northern Soul music's most enduring anthems. After a few years with no hits, popular R&B vocal group the Platters made a comeback on Musicor with the Northern Soul classics "I Love You 1000 Times" and "With This Ring".

Other artists rounding out the Musicor stable included Johnny Hartman, Kenny Dino, Harmon Bethea, Steve Rossi (of the comic duo Allen & Rossi), Puerto Rican sensation Tito Rodriguez, Former RCA Victor orchestra leader and arranger Hugo Winterhalter, Girl Group Soul vocal trio the Toys, rock group Street People which featured Rupert Holmes. Country music singer George Jones recorded prolifically for Musicor from 1964 to 1972, including two albums of duets with labelmate Melba Montgomery.

Musicor also produced some of the earliest recordings featuring the Moog synthesizer. The one-hit wonder Hot Butter scored a Top 10 hit for the label in 1972 with the song "Popcorn" (which was also Musicor's last big hit). The Electric Moog Orchestra was also on the Musicor roster, specializing in synthesized versions of music from the film Star Wars.

== See also ==
- List of record labels
