= Relight My Fire =

1979 single by Dan Hartman

Single by Dan Hartman

from the album Relight My Fire
- B-side: "Vertigo"
- Released: 1979
- Genre: Disco
- Length: 3:42
- Label: Blue Sky Records
- Songwriter: Dan Hartman
- Producer: Dan Hartman

Dan Hartman singles chronology
| "Boogie All Summer" (1979) | "Relight My Fire" (1979) | "It Hurts to Be in Love" (1980) |

Audio
- "Relight My Fire" on YouTube

"Relight My Fire" is a disco song written and released by American musician, singer, songwriter, and record producer Dan Hartman as the title track from his 1979 album of the same name. It was also performed by Costa Anadiotis' band Café Society in 1984 and British boy band Take That (with Lulu in a featured role) in 1993, five months before Hartman died.

== Dan Hartman original version ==
Originally released in 1979 as the follow-up to "Instant Replay", "Relight My Fire" topped the United States dance charts for six weeks from December 12, 1979, to February 16, 1980; it was less successful in the UK, however, where it failed to chart. Loleatta Holloway is credited as a featured vocalist on some versions of the record, singing the "strong enough to walk on through the night" refrain. The song's strings and horns were played by MFSB and conducted by longtime MFSB member Don Renaldo. The 12" version includes a 4½-minute intro called "Vertigo", often used in discos as a floor-filler before the song begins; this 11:22 version is available on Hartman's 1994 hits package titled Keep the Fire Burnin'. The title track from this album was a new recording between Hartman and Holloway, featuring some samples from "Relight My Fire".

=== Versions ===
- 7" vinyl single version, 3:42, US release: Blue Sky, CBS ZS9 2784, 1979
- 12" vinyl The Historical 1979 Re-Mix, 6:52, UK release: Blue Sky, SKY 12 8104, 1979
- Vertigo/Relight My Fire, album version, 9:44, US release: Blue Sky, JZ 36302, 1979
- 12" vinyl Vertigo/Relight My Fire (Progressive Instrumental Remix), 11:22, US release: Blue Sky, 4Z8-2790, 1979
- Vertigo/Relight My Fire (Full-length version), 11:55, mixed By John Luongo, edited by Ben Liebrand (appears on CD compilation Grand 12 inches volume 2, Sony Music Media 5198852000, 2005). This version features the full "Vertigo" intro of the "progressive instrumental mix", the entire 4-bar break and full vocal part of the album version and ends with the full outro of the "progressive instrumental mix".

=== In the media ===
- This song in instrumental form was the theme of the 1980's classic Mexican sitcom called Mis Huéspedes (My Guests, in English).
- "Relight My Fire" was featured in the 2021 television miniseries Halston.
- A parody of "Relight My Fire", named "The Few" or "RAF Pilot Song", was shown in Season 4 of the BBC children's history show Horrible Histories. It features the pilots of the World War II era Royal Air Force.
- From January 2nd-December 17, 1981, the instrumental of this song was adapted as the theme for Tom Snyder's The Tomorrow Show after it was renamed Tomorrow Coast to Coast.

=== Charts ===
==== Weekly charts ====
| Chart (1979–1980) | Peak position |
|---|---|
| Denmark (Tracklisten) | 11 |
| Netherlands (Dutch Top 40) | 3 |
| Netherlands (Single Top 100) | 7 |
| US Bubbling Under the Hot 100 (Billboard) | 5 |
| US Dance/Club Play (Billboard) | 1 |

==== Year-end charts ====
| Chart (1980) | Position |
|---|---|
| Belgium (Ultratop Flanders) | 78 |
| Netherlands (Dutch Top 40) | 18 |
| Netherlands (Single Top 100) | 64 |

== Take That version ==
"Relight My Fire"

Single by Take That featuring Lulu

from the album Everything Changes
- Released: September 27, 1993
- Genre: Dance-pop; house
- Length: 3:57
- Label: RCA; BMG
- Songwriter: Dan Hartman
- Producers: Joey Negro; Andrew Livingstone

Take That singles chronology
| "Pray" (1993) | "Relight My Fire" (1993) | "Babe" (1993) |

Lulu singles chronology
| "Let Me Wake Up in Your Arms" (1993) | "Relight My Fire" (1993) | "How 'Bout Us" (1994) |

Music video
- "Relight My Fire" on YouTube

English boy band Take That covered "Relight My Fire" in 1993 with guest vocals from Scottish singer Lulu, reprising the Holloway role. It was released in September 1993 by RCA Records and BMG as the third single from Take That's second album, Everything Changes (1993). The second of the band's 12 number-one hits, it topped the UK Singles Chart for two weeks in October same year. It was the first UK number-one single for Lulu and at the time broke the record between an act's chart debut and their reaching number one on the UK Singles Chart, happening 29 years 148 days after her debut with "Shout" in 1964.

Robbie Williams was originally intended to sing the lead vocals on the track, but Gary Barlow did it instead when the producers felt Williams could not perform the song.

The band will often perform Dan Hartman's "Vertigo/Relight My Fire" version in their tours, including the Nobody Else Tour (as the opening number, featuring British singer Juliet Roberts in the female vocal role), The Ultimate Tour (with Lulu returning to perform the vocals) and The Circus Live (featuring Loleatta Holloway, who performed on Hartman's original version).

In 1999, Love to Infinity remixed Take That's cover and issued it on a 12-inch single pressing "3.0 Hitmixes". In 2005, the track was remixed for their reunion compilation, known as the 'Element Remix'. However, only a three-track CD single featuring the new remix was issued to DJs while the commercial CD single pressing was withdrawn.

The band appeared on Mooi! Weer de Leeuw in the Netherlands on March 14, 2009, to perform "The Garden". They also ended up performing "Back For Good" and "Relight My Fire" due to popular demand from the host and audience the next day.

=== Critical reception ===
AllMusic editor Peter Fawthrop described "Relight My Fire" as a "saucy dance track". Another AllMusic editor, Dave Thompson, considered the Lulu collaboration "a riot". Tony Parsons from The Daily Telegraph complimented the cover as "engaging". Tom Ewing of Freaky Trigger stated that it was "a confident consolidation of their stardom", and named it a "fine" and "very enjoyable" song. He also remarked that Lulu "had the lungs for the job – she needed to, replacing a Loleatta Holloway vocal." In his weekly UK chart commentary, James Masterton wrote, "A hit almost before it started". Alan Jones from Music Week gave it a full score of five out of five and named it Pick of the Week, a "storming version" and "faithful to the original", with the guest vocalist turning in "an excellent performance". He concluded, "This is certain to follow 'Pray' all the way to number one." Mike Soutar from Smash Hits gave "Relight My Fire" four out of five, noting that it "sounds so authentically '70s" He also stated that Lulu "fits in. A stroke of genius."

=== Chart performance ===
"Relight My Fire" peaked at number one in both Israel and the UK. In the UK, it debuted at the top of the UK Singles Chart on October 3, 1993. It was Take That's second number-one hit on the chart and spent two weeks at the top. In Israel, it also peaked for two weeks at the top. Additionally, it was a top-10 hit in Belgium, Finland, Ireland, Lithuania, and the Netherlands. "Relight My Fire" was also a top-20 hit in Denmark, Germany and Switzerland, a top-30 hit in Austria, and Iceland. It both debuted and peaked on the Eurochart Hot 100 in the same week, at number eight on 16 October, after charting in the UK and Ireland. Elsewhere, it was a top-40 hit in Australia, peaking at number 33, as well as charting in Japan. "Relight My Fire" earned a platinum record in the UK for sales of over 600,000 copies.

=== Music video ===
A music video was produced to promote the single, which was filmed on August 31, 1993 and directed by Jimmy Fletcher. It depicts the band and singer Lulu dancing and partying in a club atmosphere.

=== Track listings ===
"Motown Medley" contains versions of "Just My Imagination", "My Girl", "Reach Out (I'll Be There)", "Get Ready", "Treat Her Like a Lady" and "I Got You (I Feel Good)".

- UK and Japanese CD1
1. "Relight My Fire" (radio version) – 3:59
2. "Relight My Fire" (full length version) – 11:17
3. "Relight My Fire" (Late Night mix) – 6:47
4. "Relight My Fire" (All Night mix) – 6:58
5. "Relight My Fire" (Night Beats) – 5:20
- UK and Japanese CD2
1. "Relight My Fire" (radio version) – 4:11
2. "Why Can't I Wake Up with You?" (live version) – 5:13
3. "Motown Medley" (live version) – 10:14
4. "Take That and Party" (live version) – 2:49
- UK 7-inch and cassette single; Japanese mini-CD single
1. "Relight My Fire" (radio version) – 3:59
2. "Why Can't I Wake Up with You?" (live version) – 5:13
- European CD single
1. "Relight My Fire" (radio version) – 3:59
2. "Why Can't I Wake Up with You?" (live version) – 5:13
3. "Relight My Fire" (Late Night mix) – 6:47
- Australian CD single
1. "Relight My Fire" (radio version) – 3:59
2. "Relight My Fire" (full length version) – 11:17
3. "Relight My Fire" (Late Night mix) – 6:47
4. "Why Can't I Wake Up with You?" (live version) – 5:13
5. "Take That and Party" (live) – 2:49
- UK withdrawn CD single (2005)
1. "Relight My Fire" (Element remix) – 3:46
2. "Relight My Fire" (original version) – 4:11
3. "Relight My Fire" (Element remix video) – 4:12
- UK withdrawn 12-inch single (2005)

A1. "Relight My Fire" (Element remix) – 3:46
B1. "Relight My Fire" (Joey Negro club mix) – 6:43
B2. "Relight My Fire" (Joey Negro vocal mix) – 7:05

=== Personnel ===
- Gary Barlow – lead vocals
- Howard Donald – backing vocals
- Jason Orange – backing vocals
- Mark Owen – backing vocals
- Robbie Williams – backing vocals
- Lulu – guest vocals, backing vocals

=== Charts ===
==== Weekly charts ====
| Chart (1993–1994) | Peak position |
|---|---|
| Australia (ARIA) | 33 |
| Austria (Ö3 Austria Top 40) | 27 |
| Belgium (Ultratop 50 Flanders) | 10 |
| Denmark (IFPI) | 19 |
| Europe (Eurochart Hot 100) | 8 |
| Europe (European AC Radio) | 7 |
| Europe (European Hit Radio) | 3 |
| Europe (Channel Crossovers) | 2 |
| Finland (Suomen virallinen lista) | 5 |
| France Airplay (SNEP) | 95 |
| Germany (GfK) | 18 |
| Greece (IFPI Greece) | 4 |
| Iceland (Íslenski Listinn Topp 40) | 24 |
| Ireland (IRMA) | 2 |
| Israel (Israeli Singles Chart) | 1 |
| Japan (Oricon) | 33 |
| Lithuania (M-1) | 4 |
| Netherlands (Dutch Top 40) | 12 |
| Netherlands (Single Top 100) | 10 |
| Singapore (SPVA) | 1 |
| Spain Airplay (Top 40 Radio) | 23 |
| Sweden (Sverigetopplistan) | 32 |
| Switzerland (Schweizer Hitparade) | 18 |
| UK Singles (Official Charts) | 1 |
| UK Airplay (Music Week) | 2 |
| UK Club Chart (Music Week) | 29 |

==== Year-end charts ====
| Chart (1993) | Position |
|---|---|
| Belgium (Ultratop 50 Flanders) | 78 |
| Europe (Eurochart Hot 100) | 76 |
| Israel (Israeli Singles Chart) | 12 |
| Netherlands (Dutch Top 40) | 127 |
| UK Singles (OCC) | 28 |
| UK Airplay (Music Week) | 42 |

=== Certifications ===
| Region | Certification | Certified units/sales |
|---|---|---|
| United Kingdom (BPI) Physical | Silver | 200,000^{^} |
| United Kingdom (BPI) Digital | Gold | 400,000^{‡} |
^{^} Shipments figures based on certification alone.^{‡} Sales+streaming figures based on certification alone.

=== Release history ===
| Region | Date | Format(s) | Label(s) | Ref(s). |
|---|---|---|---|---|
| United Kingdom | September 27, 1993 | 7-inch vinyl; CD1; cassette | RCA; BMG | |
| United Kingdom | October 4, 1993 | CD2 | RCA; BMG | |
| Australia | November 8, 1993 | CD; cassette | RCA; BMG | |
| Japan | November 21, 1993 | Mini-CD | RCA; BMG | |
| Japan | December 1, 1993 | 2 CDs | RCA; BMG | |

== Ricky Martin version ==
"Relight My Fire"

Single by Ricky Martin featuring Loleatta Holloway
- Released: February 4, 2003
- Recorded: 2003
- Genre: EDM
- Length: 4:17
- Label: Columbia
- Songwriter: Dan Hartman
- Producer: Hex Hector

Ricky Martin singles chronology
| "Come to Me" (2002) | "Relight My Fire" (2003) | "Tal Vez" (2003) |

Puerto Rican singer and songwriter Ricky Martin covered "Relight My Fire" in 2003. In late January 2003, Billboard reported that Grammy Award-winning remixer Hex Hector recently spent time in the studio with Martin and Anastacia. The trio, with Hector in the producer's seat, completed a cover of Dan Hartman's disco classic "Relight My Fire." Billboard added that Anastacia reprised Loleatta Holloway's performance from the original, and the song should appear on Martin's forthcoming album. However, the single released in February 2003 included Holloway's original vocals, and the song did not appear on any of Martin's albums. "Relight My Fire" is credited to "Martin featuring Loleatta Holloway."

=== Chart performance ===
On the Billboard issue dated April 19, 2003, "Relight My Fire" appeared on the Hot Dance Breakouts chart, and on May 3, 2003, it entered the Dance Club Songs at number thirty-eight. The song peaked at number five on June 21, 2003, and spent twelve weeks on the Dance Club Songs chart.

=== Charts ===
| Chart (2003) | Peak position |
|---|---|
| US Dance Club Songs (Billboard) | 5 |
