= Keep the Fire Burnin' =

Keep the Fire Burnin' may refer to:

- "Keep the Fire Burnin'" (REO Speedwagon song), 1982
- "Keep the Fire Burnin'" (Dan Hartman song), 1994
- Keep the Fire Burnin' (album), an album by Dan Hartman
