= It Hurts to Be in Love (album) =

Studio album by Dan Hartman
- Released: 1981
- Studios: The Schoolhouse (Westport, Connecticut)
- Genres: Pop, pop rock
- Length: 35:10
- Label: Blue Sky
- Producer: Dan Hartman

Dan Hartman chronology
| Relight My Fire (1979) | It Hurts to Be in Love (1981) | I Can Dream About You (1984) |

Singles from It Hurts to Be in Love
- 1. "Heaven in Your Arms" Released: February 1981; 2. "It Hurts to Be in Love" Released: June 1981; 3. "All I Need" Released: August 1981

It Hurts to Be in Love is the fourth studio album from American singer and songwriter Dan Hartman, released by Blue Sky in 1981. It was produced by Hartman and mixed by Neil Dorfsman.

== Background ==
After the success of Hartman's two disco-oriented albums Instant Replay (1978) and Relight My Fire (1979), Hartman changed musical direction with It Hurts to Be in Love. Returning to the sound of his 1976 album Images, the album moved away from disco to a more melodic pop-rock sound. The album was recorded at the Schoolhouse (Hartman's own home studio in Connecticut), mixed at Power Station and mastered at Sterling Sound.

It Hurts to Be in Love failed to make a chart appearance in the US, although the three singles from it saw some chart action. The first, "Heaven in Your Arms", reached No. 86 on the Billboard Hot 100. "It Hurts to Be in Love", a cover of the 1964 hit by Gene Pitney, was the second single, which peaked at No. 72 on the Billboard Hot 100, and No. 48 on the Dance Music/Club Play chart. The third and final single, "All I Need", reached No. 10 on the Bubbling Under the Hot 100 chart. It also peaked at No. 41 on the Billboard Hot Adult Contemporary Tracks chart.

In a Blue Sky press release, Hartman spoke of the album: "I felt it was time to do the things that were truly me. This music is closer to me because it has more romantic sensitivity than I've allowed myself to show in past productions. I'm really pouring it all out. I guess you could say there's more Dan Hartman in there than any other record I've done. My music is spontaneous and provides an outlet for emotional release and expression, while my studio allows me to write, arrange and record my own songs within that same space. The result is music that comes straight from my heart - I can capture more feeling that way."

== Reception ==
Professional ratings
Review scores
| Source | Rating |
|---|---|
| AllMusic | 2/5 stars |
| The Virgin Encyclopedia of 70s Music | 2/4 stars |

Upon release, Billboard commented: "Hartman returns to his roots here; that is to the music of the mid '60s. Then he updates the sound to the '80s, creating a classy pop package. It is mid-tempo pop-rock mostly, with virtually every cut sounding like an adult contemporary single. Especially impressive here is Hartman's stylish vocalizing." People wrote: "This effort shows an eclectic taste that ranges from sensitive, James Taylorish ballads to rhythmic rockers. His rendition of the frothy pop title tune does little to improve on the 1964 original, though. Sensitive singers, the genre in which Hartman belongs, are abundant, but his agility is refreshing."

== Track listing ==
All songs written by Dan Hartman, except where noted.

| No. | Title | Writer(s) | Length |
|---|---|---|---|
| 1. | "It Hurts to Be in Love" | Howard Greenfield, Helen Miller | 2:45 |
| 2. | "Heaven in Your Arms" | | 3:34 |
| 3. | "My Desire" | Hartman, Morgan Ames | 3:38 |
| 4. | "Forever in a Moment" | | 3:12 |
| 5. | "All I Need" | | 4:07 |
| 6. | "Pick It Up" | | 3:02 |
| 7. | "I Still Remember" | | 3:31 |
| 8. | "Positive Forces" | | 3:15 |
| 9. | "Letter in a Song" | | 3:43 |
| 10. | "Hello Again" | | 4:23 |

== Personnel ==
- Dan Hartman – vocals, keyboards, all instruments except drums and synthesizers (2, 8)
- Jeff Bova – synthesizers
- Erik Cartwright – guitars
- John Pierce – bass
- Art Wood – drums
- Blanche Napoleon – lead and backing vocals (1)

Production

- Dan Hartman – producer, recording
- Jeff Jones – recording
- Neil Dorfsman – mixing at The Power Station (New York, NY)
- Barry Bongiovi – assistant engineer
- James Farber – assistant engineer
- Dave Greenberg – assistant engineer
- Ray Willhard – assistant engineer
- Ted Jensen – mastering at Sterling Sound (New York, NY)
- Carin Goldberg – design
- Jerry King Musser – photography
- Steve Paul – coordinator, management
- Teddy Slatus – coordinator, management

== Chart performance ==
=== Singles ===
It Hurts to Be in Love

| Chart (1981) | Peak position |
|---|---|
| US Billboard Dance Music/Club Play Singles | 48 |
| US Billboard Hot 100 | 72 |

Heaven in Your Arms

| Chart (1981) | Peak position |
|---|---|
| US Billboard Hot 100 | 86 |

All I Need

| Chart (1981) | Peak position |
|---|---|
| US Billboard Hot Adult Contemporary Tracks | 41 |
| US Billboard Bubbling Under the Hot 100 | 10 |
