= The Love in Your Eyes (Dan Hartman song) =

Single by Dan Hartman

from the album Keep the Fire Burnin'
- Released: November 8, 1994
- Genre: Pop
- Length: 4:06 (single version); 4:58 (album version)
- Label: Chaos Recordings (US); Columbia (Europe)
- Songwriter: Dan Hartman
- Producer: Dan Hartman

Dan Hartman singles chronology
"The Love You Take" (1988)	"The Love in Your Eyes" (1994)	"Keep the Fire Burnin'" (1995)

"The Love in Your Eyes" is a song by American musician-singer-songwriter Dan Hartman, which was released on November 8, 1994 as the first single from his posthumous album Keep The Fire Burnin'. The song reached No. 53 on Canada's RPM 100 chart in February 1995.

== Background ==
"The Love in Your Eyes" was one of Hartman's final compositions. Before his death from an AIDS-related brain tumor in March 1994, Hartman began recording a new album of contemporary pop and dance music. He revealed in 1993, "So many things have changed in terms of social and political issues, as well as the need for love and personal relationships. All of these things are the reasons why writing and recording new material is most meaningful to me." Hartman died before the album was completed, but two new songs, "Keep the Fire Burnin'" and "The Love in Your Eyes", were subsequently included on the posthumous compilation album Keep The Fire Burnin'. "The Love in Your Eyes" was released in North America on Chaos Recordings and in Europe on Columbia. It reached No. 53 on Canada's RPM 100 chart in February 1995.

== Critical reception ==
On its release, Larry Flick of Billboard said, "This [song] was among [Hartman's] final compositions, and it shows that he was still among the best writers and producers in pop music. Wrapped in warm romance, [the] tune has a retro-soul quality similar to his timeless mid-'80s hit "I Can Dream About You." Perfectly suited to several radio and club formats, [the] single is an essential programming item from the upcoming Keep the Fire Burnin'." Steve Baltin of Cash Box wrote, "This song, with its catchy dance groove, provides a strong legacy to Hartman's career, which was marked by the capability to write pop hits." Radio industry trade publication Network 40 commented, "Very accessible, this pop groover is trademark Hartman. Just like his previous hits, 'I Can Dream About You' and 'Instant Replay,' the track is blue-eyed soul combined with a catchy pop hook."

== Track listing ==
12-inch single

1. "The Love in Your Eyes" (Classic Frankie) – 7:05
2. "The Love in Your Eyes" (Classic Song) – 4:12
3. "The Love in Your Eyes" (Reprise) – 7:05
4. "The Love in Your Eyes" (DJ EFX's Raw Club) – 5:42
5. "The Love in Your Eyes" (DJ EFX's Trip Hop) – 8:19

CD single (US release)

1. "The Love in Your Eyes" (Radio Version) – 4:06
2. "The Love in Your Eyes" (Album Version) – 4:58
3. "The Love in Your Eyes" (Hip Radio Version) – 3:59
4. "The Love in Your Eyes" (Classic Frankie) – 7:03

CD single (European release)

1. "The Love in Your Eyes" (Radio Version) – 4:06
2. "The Love in Your Eyes" (Album Version) – 4:58
3. "The Love in Your Eyes" (Hip Radio Version) – 3:59
4. "The Love in Your Eyes" (Classic Frankie) – 7:03

== Personnel ==
Production

- Dan Hartman – producer, mixing on "Radio Version," "Album Version" and "Hip Radio Version" versions
- Frankie Knuckles – remixer and additional producer on "Classic Frankie," "Classic Song" and "Reprise" remixes
- Brendan McCarthy, DJ Digit, DJ Rasoul – remixer, re-production and re-working on "DJ EFX's Raw Club" and "DJ EFX's Trib Hop" remixes
- John Poppo – engineer on "Classic Frankie," "Classic Song" and "Reprise" remixes
- Eric Kupper, Terry Burrus – keyboard programming on "Classic Frankie," "Classic Song" and "Reprise" remixes
- David Shaw, John Kubrick – editing on "Radio Version," "Album Version" and "Hip Radio Version" versions
- Jose Rodriguez – mastering

== Charts ==
Chart (1995)	Peak position
Canada Top Singles (RPM)	53
Canada Adult Contemporary (RPM)	23
