= J. Michael Riva =

American production designer (1948–2012)

- Born: John Michael Riva; June 28, 1948; New York City, U.S.
- Died: June 7, 2012 (aged 63); New Orleans, Louisiana, U.S.
- Other name: Mike Riva
- Occupation: Production designer
- Years active: 1975–2012
- Spouse: Wendy Mickell
- Children: 4
- Parents: Maria Riva; William Riva
- Relatives: Marlene Dietrich (grandmother); Peter Riva (brother)
- Awards: Primetime Emmy Award

John Michael Riva (June 28, 1948 – June 7, 2012) was an American production designer.

== Early life ==
Riva was born in Manhattan, to William Riva, a Broadway set designer, and Maria Elisabeth Sieber, a German-born actress and the daughter of Marlene Dietrich. Riva had three brothers (John Peter, John Paul and John David). Riva attended the prep school Institute Le Rosey in Switzerland for six years before attending UCLA.

== Career ==
Riva had a long and prestigious career as an art director and production designer on numerous films, including the 1985 film The Color Purple, for which he was nominated for the Academy Award for Best Art Direction. Other credits include The Goonies (1985), Lethal Weapon (1987), A Few Good Men (1992), Spider-Man 3 (2007), Iron Man (2008) and Iron Man 2 (2010).

His final films, The Amazing Spider-Man and Django Unchained, were released posthumously. He was the production designer for the opening ceremony of the 1996 Summer Olympics in Atlanta, as well as for the 74th and 79th Academy Awards in 2002 and 2007, respectively. He won a Primetime Emmy Award for his work on the latter.

== Personal life and death ==
Riva was briefly engaged to actress Jamie Lee Curtis in the 1980s. He was married to Wendy Mickell, with whom he had four sons, Jean-Paul, John Michael Riva Jr., Daniel, and Adam.

Riva suffered a stroke on June 1, 2012, in New Orleans, Louisiana, during production of Django Unchained. He died in a hospital there on June 7, 2012, at age 63. Django director Quentin Tarantino commented, "Michael became a dear friend on this picture, as well as a magnificent, talented colleague."

== Filmography ==
=== Films ===
All as production designer unless stated otherwise

Year	Title	Notes
1976	Ilsa, Harem Keeper of the Oil Sheiks	Art director; credited as Mike Riva
1977	Bad Georgia Road	Art director; credited as Michael Riva
1977	I Never Promised You a Rose Garden	Uncredited
1977	Bare Knuckles	Credited as Michael Riva
1979	Fast Charlie... the Moonbeam Rider	Art director; credited as Michael Riva
1980	Brubaker	Also art director
1980	Ordinary People	Art director
1981	The Hand	
1981	Halloween II	Credited as Michael Riva
1983	Bad Boys	
1983	Strangers Kiss	Visual consultant; credited as Michael Riva
1984	The Adventures of Buckaroo Banzai Across the 8th Dimension	
1985	The Falcon and the Snowman	
1985	The Slugger's Wife	Credited as Michael Riva
1985	The Goonies	
1985	The Color Purple	
1986	The Golden Child	
1987	Lethal Weapon	
1988	Scrooged	
1989	Lethal Weapon 2	
1989	Tango & Cash	
1992	Radio Flyer	
1992	A Few Good Men	
1993	Dave	
1994	North	
1995	Congo	
1998	Hard Rain	
1998	Six Days Seven Nights	
1998	Lethal Weapon 4	
1999	House on Haunted Hill	Visual consultant
2000	Romeo Must Die	Visual consultant
2000	Charlie's Angels	
2001	Evolution	
2003	Charlie's Angels: Full Throttle	
2005	Stealth	
2005	Zathura: A Space Adventure	
2006	The Pursuit of Happyness	
2007	Spider-Man 3	(with Neil Spisak)
2008	Iron Man	
2008	Seven Pounds	
2010	Iron Man 2	
2012	The Amazing Spider-Man	Posthumous release
2012	Django Unchained	Posthumous release

=== Television ===
All as production designer unless stated otherwise

Year	Title	Notes
1981	Callie & Son	TV film
1986	Amazing Stories	Director; episode 2.12: "The Eternal Mind"; credited as Michael Riva
1990	Tales from the Crypt	Director; episode 2.18: "The Secret"; credited as Michael Riva
1994	Lily in Winter	Story; TV film
1996	1996 Summer Olympics Opening Ceremony	TV special
1999	Tuesdays with Morrie	TV film
2002	The 74th Annual Academy Awards	TV special
2007	The 79th Annual Academy Awards	TV special
