= Denise Lopez (American singer) =

American Dance/freestyle singer

- Genres: Dance, pop, freestyle
- Occupation: Singer
- Years active: 1984–1993
- Labels: TNT Records, 4th & Broadway, RCA Victor, A&M Records, Vendetta Records

Denise Lopez is an American Dance/freestyle singer, born in Queens, New York, mainly active in the late 1980s and early 1990s.

== Background ==
Lopez's first release was in 1984 via TNT Records, under the alias Neecy Dee. This was a single called "Best of Me", but it did not gain any commercial success. In 1985 she was part of a project 'band' called Love Patrol, which released one single under the same name. This was released by 4th & Broadway/Island Trading Co. and again did not gain any notable commercial attention. In 1987, she released her first single under her own name. With assistance from electro and HiNRG producers and remixers John Morales and Sergio Munzibai, "If You Feel It" was released via RCA Victor, where it made No. 22 on the Dance Music/Club Play Singles Chart, and No. 3 on the Hot Dance Music/Maxi-Singles Sales Chart. Shortly after, largely down to the club hit success of her debut single, Lopez signed with A&M Records with an album deal. It was with the label that she gained success as a solo artist. In 1988, her debut album Truth in Disguise was released in America, Canada and other European countries such as Germany and the Netherlands. The album peaked at No. 184 on The Billboard 200 Chart, and spawned three singles which saw varying levels of commercial success. "Sayin' Sorry (Don't Make It Right)" was the leading single from Lopez's debut album, and it became her biggest success, peaking at No. 31 on The Billboard Hot 100. It was also a success within the dance charts, topping the Hot Dance Music/Maxi-Singles Sales Chart, and peaking at No. 6 on the Dance Music/Club Play Singles Chart. "If You Feel It" was re-issued as the second single from the album by A&M Records, and its specialty imprint label Vendetta Records, and made an entry at No. 94 on the Billboard Hot 100, as well as re-appearing on the dance charts.

In 1989, "Too Much Too Late" was the third and final single release from the debut album, and it peaked at No. 21 on the Dance Music/Club Play Singles Chart and No. 13 on the Hot Dance Music/Maxi-Singles Sales Chart. That same year she performed a duet, "The Love You Take" with American musician-singer-songwriter Dan Hartman, for the soundtrack of the 1988 comedy film Scrooged, starring Bill Murray. The song was written and produced by Hartman, and ended up being released as a single and made an appearance on the US Cash Box Top 100 Singles Chart at No. 75. In 1990, Lopez released her second and final studio album; Every Dog Has Her Day!!! in America and Japan. It was not a big commercial success, but the sole single "Don't You Wanna Be Mine" did peak at No. 86 on The Billboard Hot 100. Though it never received a full commercial release in the UK, "Don't You Wanna Be Mine" had fast become a huge underground dance anthem in the country, and this was largely with a remix from the production duo Robert Clivillas and the late David Cole (better known as C+C Music Factory). Vendetta Records, which had been started by A&M in 1988 for releases which were chiefly freestyle and house, was shut down in 1990.

In 1991, the song "I Want U 2 Know", from Every Dog Has Her Day!!!, was included in the romantic musical comedy film Cool as Ice, starring Vanilla Ice and Kristin Minter. The track was one of the main themes of the film, played during the Kristin Minter scenes, however was not included on the official soundtrack album. I Want U 2 Know became the last airplay hit by the singer before her absence. The song gained moderate airplay during 1991–92 in the United States, due to its exposure in the film.

Afterwards Lopez disappeared from the music scene and public eye, and never made a mainstream appearance again, with the exception of guesting on a single project named Status Control, which was really Davidson Ospina. The single "Ain't You Happy (With What You Got)" was released in 1993 via Digital Dungeon Records. In 2008, "Don't You Wanna Be Mine" saw an official single release in the UK (as well as Europe), with a remix being the featured version: "Bimbo Jones Radio Edit". Released via House Trained/Universal Music TV, the single came to fruition after fans demanded an update of the club hit. Lopez had no involvement in the re-release.

== Discography ==
=== Albums ===
List of studio albums, with selected details, chart positions
Title	Studio album details	Peak chart positions
Title	Studio album details	US
Truth in Disguise	Released: 1988; Label: A&M; Formats: CD, LP, cassette, digital download, streaming	184
Every Dog Has Her Day	Released: 1990; Label: A&M; Formats: CD, LP, cassette, digital download, streaming	—
"—" denotes releases that did not chart or were not released in that territory.

=== Singles ===
- 1984: "Best of Me" (as Neecy Dee)
- 1985: "Love Patrol" (as part of the project Love Patrol)
- 1988: "If You Feel It"
- 1988: "Sayin' Sorry (Don't Make It Right)"
- 1988: "Too Much Too Late"
- 1988: "The Love You Take" (Denise Lopez & Dan Hartman)
- 1990: "Don't You Wanna Be Mine"
- 1993: "Ain't You Happy (With What You Got)" (Status Control feat. Denise Lopez)
- 2008: "Don't You Wanna Be Mine" (UK remix release)
