= Keep the Fire Burnin' (album) =

Studio album by Dan Hartman
- Released: December 20, 1994
- Length: 77:02
- Label: Columbia, Chaos
- Producer: Dan Hartman (tracks 1–3, 7–11); Jimmy Iovine, Hartman (tracks 4–6)

Dan Hartman chronology
| New Green Clear Blue (1989) | Keep the Fire Burnin' (1994) | Super Hits (2004) |

Singles from Keep the Fire Burnin'
- 1. "The Love in Your Eyes" Released: November 8, 1994; 2. "Keep the Fire Burnin'" Released: 1995

Keep the Fire Burnin' is a compilation album by American musician and singer-songwriter Dan Hartman, which was released posthumously on December 20, 1994, by Columbia. The album features remakes of Hartman's hits and previously unreleased material.

== Background ==
Following his 1989 instrumental album New Green Clear Blue, Hartman returned to producing other artists and writing his own new material. Hartman started recording a new solo album of contemporary pop and dance music in the early 1990s and commented in 1993: "So many things have changed in terms of social and political issues, as well as the need for love and personal relationships. All of these things are the reasons why writing and recording new material is most meaningful to me."

Hartman died on March 22, 1994, from an AIDS-related brain tumor. A new compilation album, titled Keep the Fire Burnin', was then released later in the year. The album spawned two singles, both of which were new songs: "The Love in Your Eyes" and "Keep the Fire Burnin'", the latter featuring Loleatta Holloway, who Hartman had worked with before. As a single, the song reached No. 49 in the UK. "Living in America", written by Hartman and Charlie Midnight, was originally released by James Brown in 1985, who scored a big hit with the track. The version that appears here is Hartman's own previously unreleased version. The tracks one, four and nine have no remake credit in the titles.

In an interview for Hartman's unofficial fan site, Midnight recalled: "I last saw Dan in the hospital in New York City. He was very optimistic and expected to go back into the studio to record more songs for a new album that eventually became, "Keep the Fire Burnin'." Because I had moved to Los Angeles, we subsequently kept in touch by telephone."

== Promotion ==
In a February 1995 issue of The Advocate, an advert for the album was published with the statement: "Dan Hartman ruled the dance floors all over the world with classics like "Instant Replay," "Relight My Fire," and "I Can Dream About You". Now these and other boogie monsters come together on his new release, "Keep the Fire Burnin'." Featuring the new single, "The Love in Your Eyes," plus his own versions of his hit songs, "Free Ride" and "Living in America." Some hits are forever."

== Reception ==
Professional ratings
Review scores
| Source | Rating |
|---|---|
| AllMusic | 3.5/5 stars |
| Entertainment Weekly | B |
| The Virgin Encyclopedia of 70s Music | 3/4 stars |

Upon release, David Browne of Entertainment Weekly commented: "Whether jumping aboard the '70s disco bandwagon or glomming on to '80s power pop, Dan Hartman was something of a hack chameleon. But this retrospective, Keep the Fire Burnin', makes its point: that his music was the worthy successor to KC's white-guy disco." Greg Morago of The Courant wrote: "Hartman was preparing to reconquer the '90s dance floor with a pop-dance collection at the time of his death. From that effort, the title song, "Keep the Fire Burnin," is Hartman at his best. Aggressive, bouncy and up-front, the track - with additional smokin' vocals by diva Loleatta Holloway of "Love Sensation" fame - proves he never lost his touch. He puts his own vocal stamp on "Living in America," the pretty "I Can Dream About You" shimmers anew in a remake, as does "Instant Replay," as close to disco perfection as possible. And "Free Ride" still takes us there. This sampling of Hartman's remarkably diverse career is a treat."

Steve Baltin of Cash Box commented: "This collection is a fitting tribute to Hartman. For those who know the music, but didn't know much about Hartman, this is a good introduction." Anthony Violanti of The Buffalo News stated: "Dan Hartman doesn't waste time kicking out the jams on his new album. "Keep the Fire Burnin'," the opening track, is a scorching, gospel-style duet with Loleatta Holloway." Tim Griggs of AllMusic noted: "This collection of hits and unreleased material by Dan Hartman is only so-so. Hartman deserves a better retrospective."

== Track listing ==
| No. | Title | Writer(s) | Length |
|---|---|---|---|
| 1. | "Keep the Fire Burnin' (Duet starring Loleatta Holloway)" | Dan Hartman | 6:01 |
| 2. | "The Love in Your Eyes" | Hartman | 5:00 |
| 3. | "Living in America" | Hartman, Charlie Midnight | 7:09 |
| 4. | "I Can Dream About You" | Hartman | 6:02 |
| 5. | "The Name of the Game" | Hartman, Midnight | 4:39 |
| 6. | "We Are the Young" | Hartman, Midnight | 4:20 |
| 7. | "Free Ride" | Hartman | 7:05 |
| 8. | "Vertigo / Relight My Fire" | Hartman | 11:24 |
| 9. | "Instant Replay" | Hartman | 5:23 |
| 10. | "Countdown / This Is It" | Hartman | 14:12 |
| 11. | "Keep the Fire Burnin' (That SFB Feeling Mix)" | Hartman | 6:06 |
