= Relight My Fire (album) =

Studio album by Dan Hartman
- Released: 1979
- Genre: Disco, pop
- Length: 34:47
- Label: Blue Sky
- Producer: Dan Hartman

Dan Hartman chronology
Instant Replay (1978)	Relight My Fire (1979)	It Hurts to Be in Love (1981)

Singles from Relight My Fire
- 1. "Relight My Fire" Released: 1979; 2. "Free Ride" Released: 1979

Relight My Fire is an album by the American musician Dan Hartman, released in 1979.

The title track, "Relight My Fire", became a hit single.

== Critical reception ==
Professional ratings
Review scores
Source	Rating
AllMusic	3/5 stars
The Muncie Star	F
Record Mirror	1/5 stars

The Muncie Star dismissed the album as "more poor disco." The Bristol Evening Post wrote that Hartman gallops "through six lengthy pieces with the rhythm never faltering, the canned excitement polished to a shine."

== Influence ==
The album inspired Miquel Brown's single "So Many Men — So Little Time". According to Ian Levine (who cowrote the song with Fiachra Trench):

The big record at [the London LGBT nightclub] Heaven was Dan Hartman's 'Relight My Fire'—that's when we brought the big fans out and two thousand people had their hands in the air screaming. It was electrifying. But there weren't enough records coming out that could capture that magic, so we started making our own. I had been at the Circus Maximus in L.A. and I saw a guy wearing a T-shirt that said, 'So many men, so little time,' and I was like, 'One day I want to make a record with that title.' The concept was I sat down with my cowriter and arranger, an Irish guy called Fiachra Trench, and I played him 'Relight My Fire' and I said, 'I want this kind of choppy piano, big powerful chords, and the idea is a woman is going to sing, instead of “I love you, I want you, you're the man of my dreams,” I want the opposite. I want “I wake up next to this man and say, 'Who are you?'” It's so naughty but nice and everyone'll love it.'

== Track listing ==
All tracks are written by Dan Hartman.

No.	Title	Length
1.	"Hands Down"	4:11
2.	"Love Strong"	4:06
3.	"Vertigo/Relight My Fire"	9:46
4.	"Just for Fun"	5:42
5.	"I Love Makin' Music"	3:54
6.	"Free Ride"	7:06

== Personnel ==
- John Luongo - Additional Coproduction, Mixer and Editor
- Dan Hartman - vocals, guitar, bass, keyboards, percussion, backing vocals
- G.E. Smith, Phil Houghton - guitar
- Hilly Michaels, Brian Brake - drums
- Jimmy Maelen, Larry Washington - congas, timbales
- Craig Peyton - vibraphone
- Blanche Napoleon - backing vocals
- John Luongo - Additional Percussion/ Hand Claps
- Michael Barbiero - additional percussion
- Loleatta Holloway - lead vocals on "Vertigo/Relight My Fire"
- Edgar Winter - alto saxophone on "Hands Down"
- Stevie Wonder - harmonica on "Hands Down"
