= All I Need (Dan Hartman song) =

Single by Dan Hartman

from the album It Hurts to Be in Love
- Released: August 1981
- Genre: Pop
- Length: 4:07
- Label: Blue Sky
- Songwriter: Dan Hartman
- Producer: Dan Hartman

Dan Hartman singles chronology
| "It Hurts to Be in Love" (1981) | "All I Need" (1981) | "I Can Dream About You" (1984) |

"All I Need" is a song by the American musician Dan Hartman, released in 1981 as the third and final single from his fourth studio album It Hurts to Be in Love. It was written and produced by Hartman.

Released in America only, "All I Need" reached No. 10 on the Billboard Bubbling Under the Hot 100 Chart, making its debut on September 26, 1981. The song also reached No. 41 on the Billboard Hot Adult Contemporary Tracks Chart. The song, like the entire It Hurts to Be in Love album, was recorded at the Schoolhouse, mixed at Power Station and mastered at Sterling Sound. The Schoolhouse was Hartman's own home studio in Connecticut.

== Release ==
"All I Need" was released by Blue Sky on 7" vinyl in America only. It was distributed and manufactured by CBS Records. The B-side, "Forever in a Moment", was taken from the It Hurts to Be in Love album. A promotional edition of the single was also issued, featuring "All I Need" on both sides of the vinyl.

"All I Need" was also the B-side to the Dutch version of the "It Hurts to Be in Love" single. Later in 1981, April Music issued a compilation of Hartman's music, simply titled Dan Hartman. It featured four tracks from It Hurts to Be in Love, including "All I Need".

== Critical reception ==
Upon release, Cash Box commented: "A spacious production surrounds this dreamy adult pop, A/C cut, as the heavily echoed vocals and instrumentals move from a simple piano opening to big, string-filled crescendoes."

== Track listing ==
7" single

1. "All I Need" - 4:07
2. "Forever in a Moment" - 3:12

7" single (promo)

1. "All I Need" - 4:07
2. "All I Need" - 4:07

== Chart performance ==
| Chart (1981) | Peak position |
|---|---|
| U.S. Billboard Hot Adult Contemporary Tracks Chart | 41 |
| U.S. Billboard Bubbling Under the Hot 100 Chart | 10 |

== Personnel ==
- Dan Hartman – vocals, keyboards, producer, recording
- Erik Cartwright – guitar
- John Pierce – bass
- Art Wood – drums
- Jeff Bova – synthesizer
- Neil Dorfsman – mixing
- Barry Bongiovi, Dave Greenberg, James Farber, Ray Willhard – assistant engineers, mixing
- Jeff Jones – recording
- Steve Paul, Teddy Slatus – management, coordinators
