= Scrooged =

1988 film by Richard Donner

- Theatrical release poster
- Directed by: Richard Donner
- Written by: Mitch Glazer; Michael O'Donoghue
- Based on: A Christmas Carol by Charles Dickens
- Produced by: Richard Donner; Art Linson
- Starring: Bill Murray; Karen Allen; John Forsythe; Bobcat Goldthwait; Carol Kane; Robert Mitchum; Michael J. Pollard; Alfre Woodard
- Cinematography: Michael Chapman
- Edited by: Fredric Steinkamp; William Steinkamp
- Music by: Danny Elfman
- Production companies: Paramount Pictures; Mirage Productions
- Distributed by: Paramount Pictures
- Release date: November 23, 1988
- Running time: 101 minutes
- Country: United States
- Language: English
- Budget: $32 million
- Box office: $100.3 million

Scrooged is a 1988 American Christmas film directed by Richard Donner and written by Mitch Glazer and Michael O'Donoghue. Inspired by Charles Dickens' 1843 novella A Christmas Carol, the film is a metafictional 20th century retelling that follows Bill Murray as Frank Cross, a cynical and selfish television executive who, while prepping for a live broadcast adaptation of A Christmas Carol, is visited on Christmas Eve by a succession of ghosts intent on helping him regain his Christmas spirit. The supporting cast includes Karen Allen, John Forsythe, Bobcat Goldthwait, Carol Kane, Robert Mitchum, Michael J. Pollard, and Alfre Woodard.

Scrooged was filmed on a $32 million budget over three months in New York City and Hollywood from December 1987 to March 1988. Murray returned to acting for the film after taking a four-year hiatus apart from a cameo appearance in Little Shop of Horrors following the success of Ghostbusters, which he found overwhelming. Murray worked with Glazer and O'Donoghue on reworking the script before agreeing to join the project. The production was tumultuous, as Murray and Donner had different visions for the film. Murray described his time on the film as "misery", while Donner called Murray "superbly creative but occasionally difficult". Along with Murray's brothers, Brian, John and Joel, Scrooged features numerous celebrity cameos.

The film's marketing capitalized on Murray's Ghostbusters role, referring to his encounters with ghosts in both films. Scrooged was released by Paramount Pictures on November 23, 1988, and grossed $100.3 million worldwide against a $32 million budget. The film received a positive response from test audiences, but was met with a mixed response upon its release from critics who found the film either too mean-spirited or too sentimental. It was nominated for an Academy Award for Best Makeup, but lost to the fantasy-comedy film Beetlejuice.

Since its release, Scrooged has become a regular television Christmastime feature, with some critics calling it an alternative to traditional Christmas films. Others have retrospectively said the movie remains relevant in the 21st century. It has appeared on various lists of the best Christmas films.

== Plot ==
On December 23, Frank Cross, the ruthless and cynical president of IBC television, is preoccupied with ensuring the success of his extravagant live broadcast of A Christmas Carol scheduled for Christmas Eve. He launches a violent, fear-mongering advertisement for the show, and fires meek executive Eliot Loudermilk for questioning its content.

That night, Frank is visited by the ghost of his mentor Lew Heyward, who died an unloved miser and regrets not performing good deeds while alive. Lew warns a terrified Frank that he will soon be visited by three ghosts to help him avoid the same fate. Frank's phone then mysteriously dials Claire Phillips, his ex-girlfriend. Claire visits Frank at his office, but he is too preoccupied with production issues to give her his attention. Meanwhile, Frank's erratic behavior leads his boss, Preston Rhinelander, to assign Brice Cummings, an ambitious acquaintance, to assist with the production. Frank deduces that Brice wants to replace him.

On Christmas Eve, Frank is visited by the Ghost of Christmas Past, a chain-smoking taxi driver. The Ghost takes Frank back to Christmas 1955, where a young Frank finds comfort in television shows to escape the neglect of his father, who dismisses Christmas traditions. Transported to 1968, an older Frank works through the IBC office Christmas party but also meets and falls in love with Claire. By 1971, however, his growing selfishness, workaholism, and disregard for Claire's feelings have driven her away. Returned to the present, Frank visits Claire at the homeless shelter she runs, refusing to believe someone could be genuinely altruistic. When Claire offers to help him, Frank mocks her work and the homeless individuals she assists, including a man named Herman. He advises Claire to prioritize herself over others.

The Ghost of Christmas Present, a violent fairy, takes Frank to the apartment of his loyal assistant Grace. There, Frank witnesses her struggles to support her large family, including her youngest son Calvin, who has remained mute since witnessing his father's death. Frank is then shown his brother, James, who, despite celebrating Christmas with his loved ones, still misses Frank's presence after years of declined Christmas invitations and impersonal gifts. The Ghost abruptly abandons Frank in a utility space under a sidewalk, with Herman's frozen corpse. Desperate to escape, Frank breaks through a boarded door, finding himself transported to the production set minutes before broadcast. Overwhelmed, Frank retires to his office, while Brice takes over the production.

Having since been left by his wife and child, a despondent and armed Eliot arrives to kill Frank, who flees into an elevator, where he is met by the Grim Reaper-like Ghost of Christmas Future. The Ghost transports Frank to a bleak future: Calvin has been institutionalized, and Claire, having followed Frank's advice, is now a vain and selfish socialite. Finally, Frank is shown his own cremation ceremony, attended only by James and his wife. A terrified Frank suddenly finds himself inside the coffin as it is consumed by flames, only to be jolted back to the elevator, face-to-face with Eliot.

Having experienced a profound transformation, Frank jubilantly rehires Eliot with a pay increase. With Eliot's help, he takes over the production set, restrains Brice, and interrupts the live broadcast to share his newfound appreciation for life and his belief that it is never too late to change. Frank publicly apologizes to Grace, James, and the cast and crew for his past behavior and delivers a heartfelt plea to Claire. Watching the broadcast, Claire is moved and rushes to the network with help from the Ghost of Christmas Past. As they reunite, Calvin, inspired by Frank's words, speaks for the first time, saying, "God bless us, everyone." Frank leads the crew and audience in singing "Put a Little Love in Your Heart" as the ghosts of Christmas Past, Present, Future, Lew, and Herman look on with approval.

== Cast ==
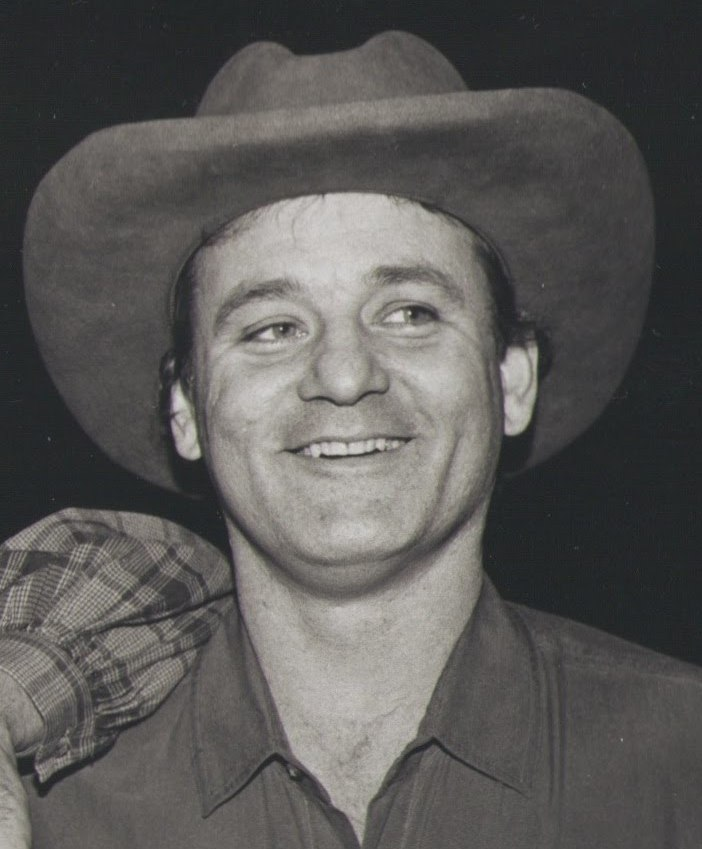
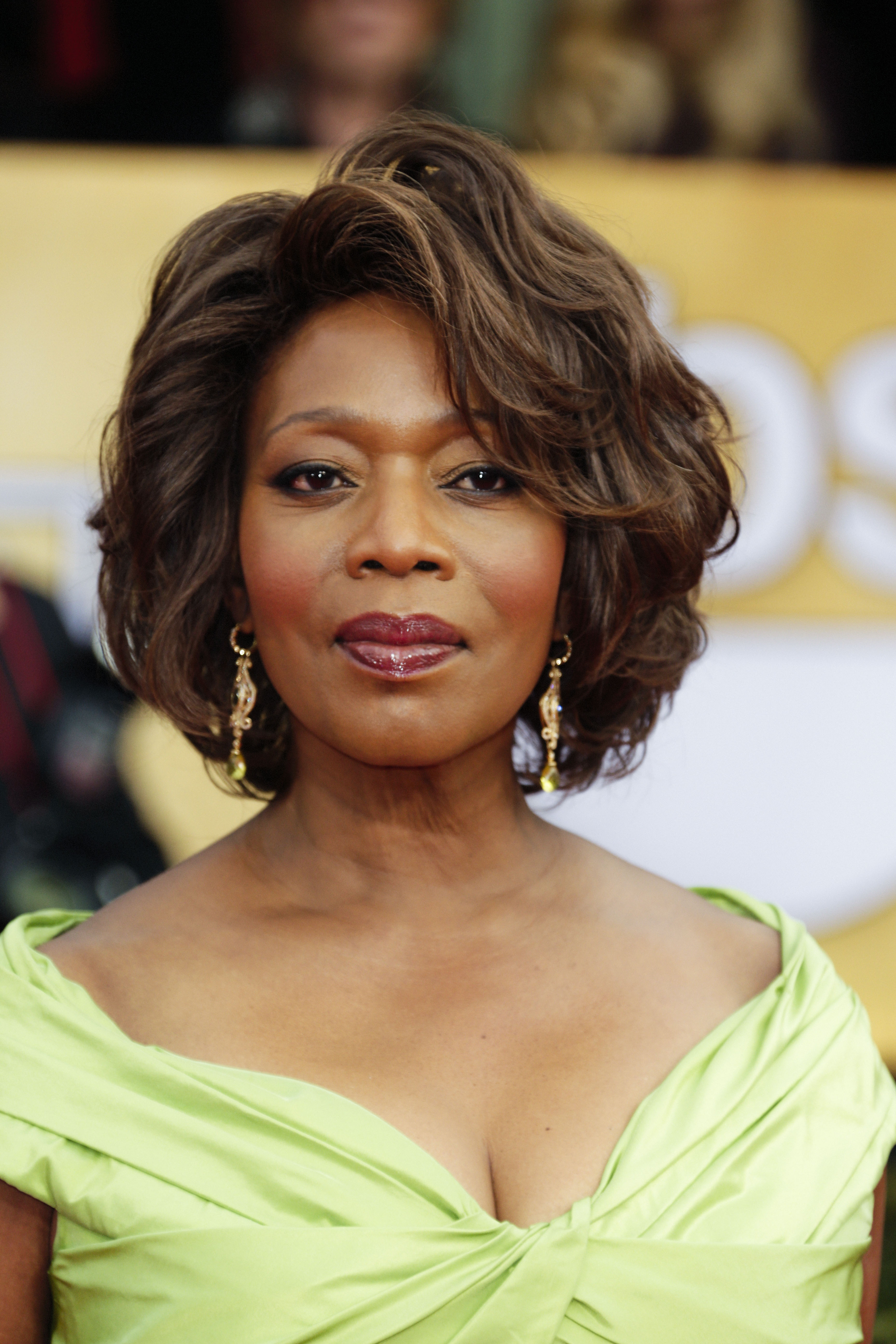
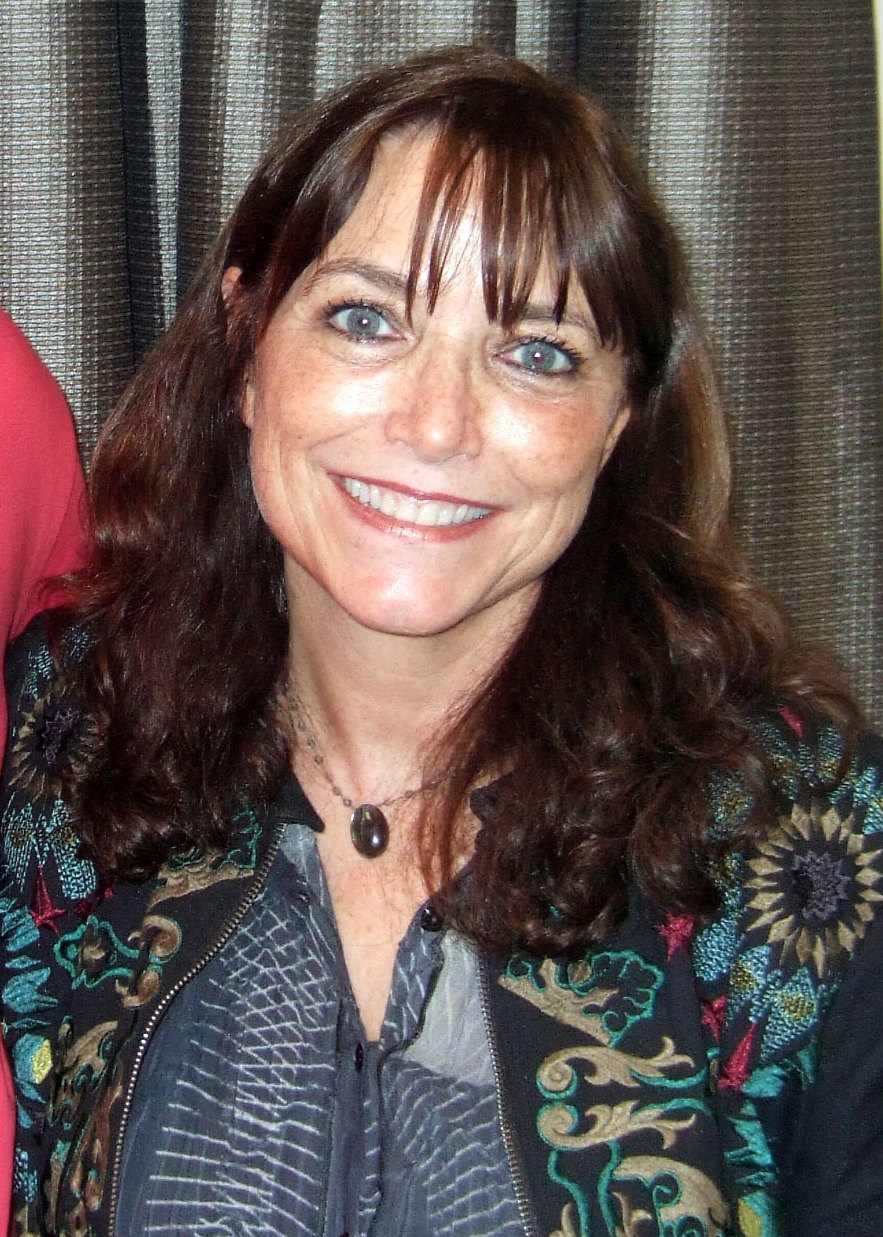
Bill Murray (pictured in 1989), Alfre Woodard, and Karen Allen (both 2013)
- Bill Murray as Frank Cross, the president of IBC
- Karen Allen as Claire Phillips, the ex-girlfriend of Frank who helps out at the homeless shelter
- John Forsythe as Lew Hayward, Frank's former mentor who died of a heart attack while golfing
- John Glover as Brice Cummings, a man who is assigned to help Frank
- Bobcat Goldthwait as Eliot Loudermilk, a meek executive at IBC
- David Johansen as the Ghost of Christmas Past, he is depicted as a chain-smoking taxi driver whose taxi cab can travel through time
- Carol Kane as the Ghost of Christmas Present, depicted as a violent nice-speaking fairy
- Robert Mitchum as Preston Rhinelander, the head of IBC
- Nicholas Phillips as Calvin Cooley, a boy who was mute since the death of his father
- Michael J. Pollard as Herman, a homeless man that Frank encounters at the homeless shelter
- Alfre Woodard as Grace Cooley, the secretary of Frank and mother of Calvin
- Mabel King as Gramma, the mother of Grace and grandmother of Calvin
- John Murray as James Cross, the brother of Frank

The cast also includes Mary Ellen Trainor as IBC executive Ted, Wendie Malick as James' wife Wendie Cross, Brian Doyle-Murray as Frank and James' father Earl Cross, Lisa Mende as Frank and James' mother Doris Cross, and Maria Riva as Preston's wife Mrs. Rhinelander.

Scrooged features several cameo appearances, including Lee Majors, John Houseman, and Robert Goulet portraying themselves, Miles Davis, Paul Shaffer, David Sanborn, the Solid Gold Dancers, Buddy Hackett as Scrooge, Mary Lou Retton (as "Tiny Tim" Cratchit), Jamie Farr as Jacob Marley, Larry Carlton as a street musician, and Anne Ramsey and her husband Logan Ramsey as two homeless people in the shelter.

== Production ==
=== Development ===
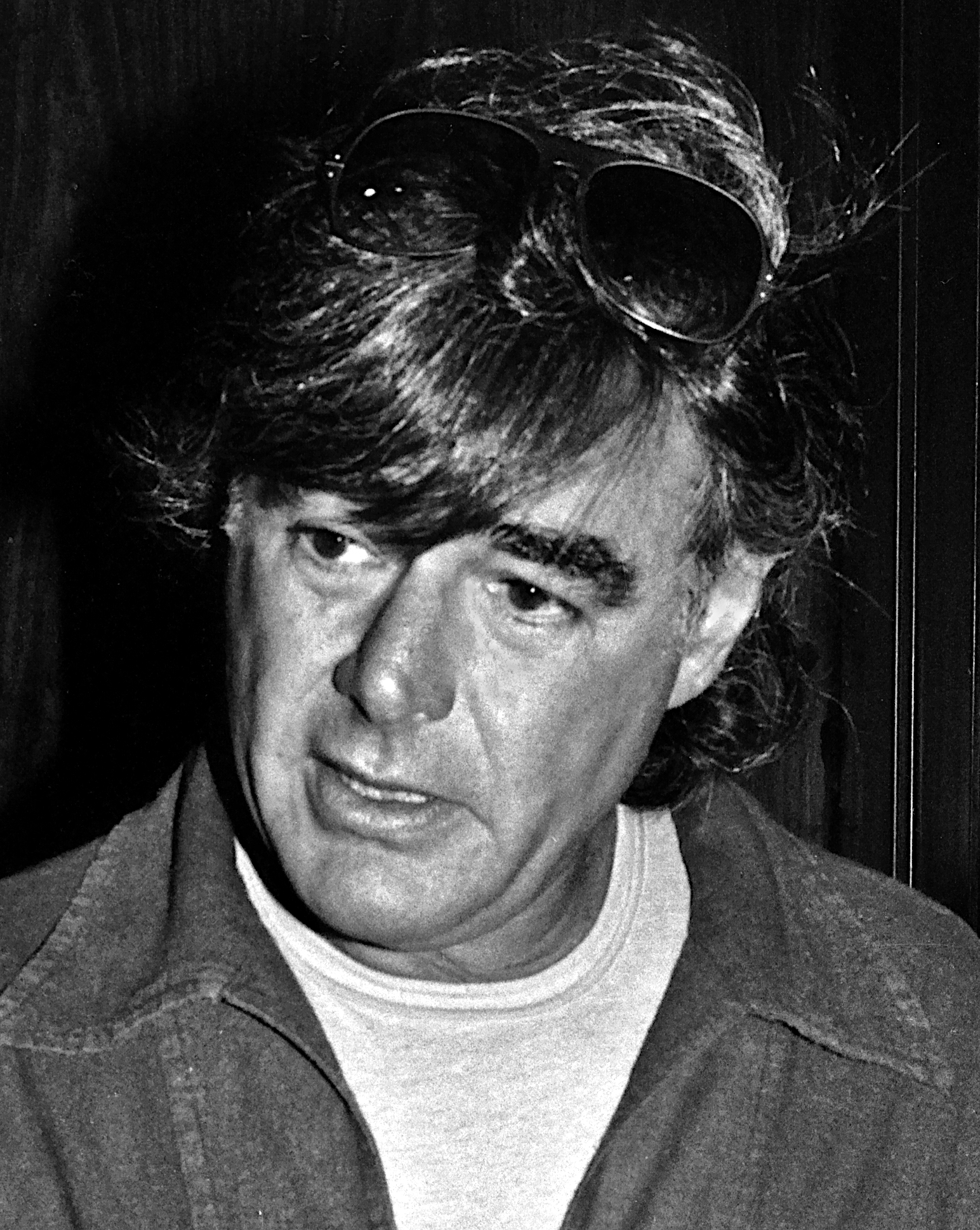
Director Richard Donner in 1979

Scrooged was filmed on a $32 million budget over three-and-a-half months on sets in Hollywood. Exterior shots of the IBC building were filmed outside of the Seagram Building in New York City. Murray considered himself "rusty" after having left acting for four years following the release of The Razor's Edge (1984). In contrast to the success of Ghostbusters (1984) as a phenomenon that would forever be his biggest success, the failure of The Razor's Edge made him feel "radioactive" and resulting in him avoiding making movies temporarily.

Murray had the opportunity to work on Scrooged over two years earlier but was enjoying his break from work. When he did feel a desire to return to acting, he said the "scripts were just not that good", and he returned to the Scrooged project as he found the idea of making a funny Scrooge appealing. Murray was paid $6 million for his role. Producer Art Linson justified the figure by saying that for each year Murray stayed away from films, his audience draw and therefore fee potentially increased. At the time, Linson said that aside from Eddie Murphy, Murray's was the only other name that could draw $10 million of tickets in the opening three to four days.

Murray wanted several changes to the script once he joined the project; among other changes, the romantic plot with Karen Allen's Claire was expanded, and the family scenes were reworked as Murray felt they were "off". Murray worked with scriptwriters Michael O'Donoghue and Mitch Glazer (whom Murray had previously worked with on Saturday Night Live) until Murray was confident enough to begin filming. O'Donoghue and Glazer found the film's denouement, in which Murray reveals his redemption live on TV, to be the most difficult to write. They settled on the example of Christmas Eve in New York, where people are nice to each other for one night, believing it to be a "miracle we could live with".

Murray was concerned with how he should portray the scene, with Glazer telling him to follow the script. Wanting a central acting moment, however, Murray gave an emotional and intense performance, deviating from his marked positions and improvising his speech. Glazer and O'Donoghue thought that the actor was suffering a mental breakdown. After he was finished, the crew applauded Murray, but O'Donoghue remarked "What was that? The Jim Jones hour?" Donner turned and punched O'Donoghue in the arm, leaving him bruised for a week.

The production was rife with conflict between Murray and Donner. Murray described the experience as having a "fair amount of misery" and said "That's a tough one; I still have trouble talking about [Scrooged]", describing working on a "dusty, smelly, and smokey" set, feeling alone, and even coughing up blood due to the fake snow being used. He also admitted to feeling pressure from being the solo star of a film compared to previous productions like Ghostbusters, as he was on set mostly every day while some actors would make brief cameos requiring only a day or two of work.

Donner himself said that he had never worked with Murray before and met up with him for drinks before accepting the project to see if they would get along; they did. The director was more positive about their relationship, describing Murray as "superbly creative but occasionally difficult - as difficult as any actor." Donner said that Murray was always in a professional mental state on set, believing it made him stressed, so the crew would do "silly things" to improve morale. Donner had not worked with an improvisational comedian like Murray before, who ad-libbed many of his lines, saying "you don't direct [Murray], you pull him back".

In a 1990 interview with Roger Ebert, Murray said that Scrooged "could have been a really, really great movie. The script was so good... [Donner] kept telling me to do things louder, louder, louder. I think he was deaf." In a later 1993 interview, Murray said that he and Donner had different visions for the type of film Scrooged would become, adding that there was potentially only one take in the finished film that was his.

In a 1989 interview, Murray said, "He shot a big, long, sloppy movie", describing how a lot of filmed content was not present in the film's final cut. For his part, O'Donoghue later said that Donner did not understand comedy, omitting the script's subtler elements for louder and faster moments. He estimated that only 40% of his and Glazer's original script made it into the final film and the surviving content was "twisted". The final cut of the film runs for 97 minutes.

=== Casting ===
Bill Murray said that "being the meanest person in the world" as Frank Cross was fun. He described his challenge as having an edge but then completing Cross's transformation into a decent person at the end. Murray said "being a decent person is not that hard. But acting like one is." Carol Kane's ghost was intended to have a body double for ballet scenes until set designer saw Kane rehearsing the dance and convinced Donner that the resulting scene would be funnier with Kane's "horrible" dancing.

Donner and Murray said that Kane would sometimes experience long crying periods during filming, caused by frustration over her violent scenes. Murray also endured some physical pain during his encounters with Kane's character, insisting that she actually hit him during their scenes together, and at one point tearing the inside of his lip when Kane pulled his lip too hard. Kane herself said "I hit Bill Murray with a toaster, and with my wings, and I kicked him in areas that weren't pleasant for him. I had fun. I don't think it was as fun for Bill, because he was the victim! I did what the stunt people told me, but when I had to flap my wings in his face, I really couldn't control them."

The film also features three of Murray's brothers; Joel Murray cameos as a party guest, Brian Doyle-Murray plays Frank's father, and John Murray plays his on-screen brother James. The film also features the final appearance of the Solid Gold Dancers. Comedian Sam Kinison was considered for the role of the Ghost of Christmas Past before it went to musician David Johansen, a personal friend of Murray's. Robert Mitchum cameos as Frank's boss Preston Rhinelander; the actor was not interested in the small role, but Donner asked him to meet with Murray, who convinced him to take the part. Lee Majors cameos as himself in the film after being contacted directly by Donner. Majors appears in the opening scene helping to save Santa Claus. Majors was armed with a stripped-down M134 Minigun, the same one featured in Predator, which he found difficult to carry due to its weight.

== Soundtrack ==
In 1989, A&M Records released the soundtrack to Scrooged, which features nine songs. Seven of the songs were released as singles: "Put a Little Love in Your Heart" (October 1988), "The Love You Take" (December 1988), "The Christmas Song (Chestnuts Roasting on an Open Fire)" (December 1988), "We Three Kings of Orient Are", "A Wonderful Life", "Sweetest Thing" (1988), and "Christmas Must Be Tonight".

The rendition of "Put a Little Love in Your Heart" by Al Green and Annie Lennox spent 17 weeks in the U.S. music charts, peaking at number 9 on January 14, 1989.

Track listing
No.	Title	Writer(s)	Artist	Length
1.	"Put a Little Love in Your Heart"	Jackie DeShannon, Randy Myers, Jimmy Holiday	Annie Lennox & Al Green	3:48
2.	"A Wonderful Life"	Judson Spence, Monroe Jones	Mark Lennon	4:19
3.	"Sweetest Thing"	U2	New Voices of Freedom featuring Adriane McDonald & George Pendergrass	4:12
4.	"The Love You Take"	Dan Hartman	Dan Hartman & Denise Lopez	4:21
5.	"Get Up 'n' Dance"	L. Mallison, Mohandas Dewese, R. Isaacs	Kool Moe Dee	4:09
6.	"We Three Kings of Orient Are"	John Henry Hopkins Jr.	Miles Davis, Larry Carlton, David Sanborn & Paul Shaffer	4:43
7.	"Christmas Must Be Tonight"	Robbie Robertson	Robbie Robertson	4:51
8.	"Brown Eyed Girl"	Van Morrison	Buster Poindexter	3:34
9.	"The Christmas Song (Chestnuts Roasting on an Open Fire)"	Mel Tormé, Robert Wells	Natalie Cole	3:53

== Release ==
The film's marketing made references to Murray's role in Ghostbusters, with taglines including "Bill Murray is back among the ghosts, only this time, it's three against one". Scrooged premiered in Los Angeles, California on November 17, 1988, followed by its public release on November 23, 1988.

=== Box office ===
Scrooged was a moderate box office hit on release in the United States. It earned $18.6 million during its release over its Thanksgiving-extended opening weekend in the United States at 1,262 theaters. It was the highest earning film that weekend, ahead of The Land Before Time ($8.1 million) and Oliver & Company ($6.3 million), both in their second weekend, and made Scrooged the fourth highest-opening weekend of the year.

The second weekend saw an over 40% drop, taking $7.5 million. Over the Christmas holiday period itself, the film had fallen to ninth place, behind The Land Before Time and Oliver & Company. The film left theaters after eight weeks with a total gross of $60.3 million, making it the 13th highest-grossing film of 1988.

The film grossed $40 million overseas for a worldwide total of $100.3 million.

=== Home media ===
Scrooged was released on VHS and Laserdisc in 1989 and DVD in 1999. The DVD version was scheduled for re-release on October 31, 2006, as the "Yule Love It!" edition. This version was to include commentary by Donner, "On the set with Bill Murray", Murray's message from the ShoWest exhibitors convention, and other featurettes including "The Look of Scrooged", "Updating Ebeneezer", "Bringing the Ghosts to Life" and "Christmas to Remember". Although Paramount promoted the "Yule Love It!" edition with images of a custom DVD case and a retail price as late as September that year, it missed its release date and it remains unreleased. The reason for this has not been disclosed.

Scrooged was released on Blu-ray on November 1, 2011. The release featured a 1080p resolution transfer of the original film and DTS HD Master Audio 5.1 quality sound. The release was criticized for only including the film's theatrical trailer, with Collider's Phil Brown saying "there must be some incredible behind-the-scenes stories to tell." In August 2023, Paramount Home Entertainment announced the 4K version of Scrooged, being released November 7, 2023 for the film's 35th anniversary.

== Reception ==
=== Critical response ===
Pre-release audience screenings in 1988 were positive, with 93% of those surveyed rating the film as "very good", the highest rating studio Paramount Pictures had received at the time. Press screenings nearer to release however were met with responses ranging from ovations to disgruntlement. Audiences polled by CinemaScore gave the film an average grade of "B+" on an A+ to F scale.

On release, reviews were similarly mixed. Roger Ebert called it one of the most "disquieting, unsettling films to come along in quite some time", saying that it portrays pain and anger more than comedy. Empire's William Thomas called it a slick and cynical update of Dickens's tale, but that it is only funny when Murray's character is being a "complete bastard". The Washington Post's Joe Brown said that it was a "sprawling mess", but that he liked it. Brown said that Scrooged was unlikely to become a seasonal tradition like It's a Wonderful Life (1946) and Miracle on 34th Street (1947), considering that it would age poorly and either scare or be too adult for child audiences.

The Los Angeles Times's Sheila Benson said the film's opening is its high-point, featuring the parody IBC lineup of "Robert Goulet's Cajun Christmas" and "The Night the Reindeer Died", but as the film progresses the laughs become more sporadic and the tone becomes darker. Benson said that the film is a "mass of sharp, well-deserved paper cuts" to the entertainment industry, citing Murray's character whose life knowledge is based on the Golden Age of Television, and Mitchum's character who wants to add elements to the network shows that attract pet audiences, but Benson lamented that these details were never expanded upon.

The Hollywood Reporter said that the story was uproarious and sometimes vitriolic, labeling it a scathing satire of the entertainment industry, that was a "wild and wooly holiday feast that should scrape off the competition". Their review continued that Scrooged features "wickedly amusing flashbacks", but also some overwrought comic misfires. The Radio Times's John Ferguson appreciated the film, calling it a "joyously black Christmas treat", but once the "sentimentality starts seeping in", it seems like a misstep. A 2007 review by Den of Geek agreed, saying that the film and Murray are at their best before the redemption begins, and that the only film to come close to capturing Murray's vitriol was Bad Santa (2003).

Jonathan Rosenbaum called Scrooged an ironic film, for seemingly condemning the commercialization of Christmas while also capitalizing on it, taking on the moral message of A Christmas Carol, "without sacrificing its yuppie priorities for an instant". Rosenbaum cited the ending in particular, wherein Frank gives his Christmas message, causing Karen to leave the needy homeless to come to his side, and both are watched over approvingly by Herman, a homeless man who froze to death. Ebert and Empire concurred about the ending. Ebert said that the necessary words are spoken by the characters, but it lacks heart, continues at embarrassing length, and seems like an onscreen breakdown. Empire also called the ending embarrassing and beyond Murray's capabilities. Conversely, the BBC's Ben Falk said it is hard not to join in singing at the end.

Critics were divided by Murray's performance. Falk said that Murray is a comic genius at his best, and Brown said that he created a credible, comic character. Ferguson said that the first part of Scrooged featured Murray at "his sour faced best". The Hollywood Reporter called him "hilariously convincing" and "impressively sinister" as the TV executive, saying that his hip and sassy performance gives the film energy, nuttiness and charm. Their review said that his deadpan, cutting style was hilarious, but that he layers the character's histrionics with inner sensibility that makes his eventual redemption believable and uplifting.

Conversely, Ebert said that Murray looks genuinely unhappy, and lacked the lightness and good cheer lurking beneath previous performances. Ebert also criticized Murray's ad-libbing, blaming it for being at odds with, and blocking the flow of the story. Benson said that Murray imbued Frank Cross's worst attributes with sincerity, making his redemption difficult to accept.

Carol Kane was praised for her performance, with The Hollywood Reporter referring to her as a "certified hoot", and Entertainment Weekly's Sara Vilkomerson saying that she "steals the show" from Murray. Benson said that watching her fragile, winged character pummel Murray was "strangely satisfying", although the joke eventually wore out. Benson was more positive on Woodard, saying that she offered the film's one completely persuasive performance.

The Hollywood Reporter also praised Woodard, Mitchum, and John Glover's credible portrayal of a sleazy executive. Both The Hollywood Reporter and Brown appreciated Goldthwait's role, with Brown calling it "twitchingly touching". Thomas called Johansen's Ghost of Christmas Past a "bonus", but he and Benson lamented the "king's ransom of actors" that were wasted. The Hollywood Reporter said that Elfman's music is "full blast with holiday spirit", and singled out J. Michael Riva's production design, calling it "dead on the mark funny".

O'Donoghue was very critical of the finished film. He said, "We wrote a fucking masterpiece. We wrote It Happened One Night (1934). We wrote a story that could make you laugh and cry. You would have wanted to share it with your grandchildren every fucking Christmas for the next 100 years. The finished film was a piece of unadulterated, unmitigated shit."

=== Awards ===
Make up artists Thomas R. Burman and Bari Dreiband-Burman were responsible for the film's single nomination at the 61st Academy Awards for Best Makeup, losing to Beetlejuice.

== Legacy ==
Since its release, Scrooged has become a cult classic and a Christmas classic, being regularly shown on television during the holiday period. Entertainment Weekly's Whitney Pastorek called it an immortal classic and argued that it is the most underrated Christmas movie. Pastorek said that the film is "both crude and sentimental, resonant and ludicrous...Scrooged is the perfect holiday movie for bitter, reluctant, closet Christmas lovers". The Boston Globe's Maura Johnston said that the film remained relevant years later.

PopMatters said that their view of the ongoing commercialization of Christmas, and the film's anticipation of marketing tactics aimed at pets watching television, made the film more relevant now than at the time of its release. In 2012, Den of Geek! described it as the "finest Christmas comedy of all time". Al Green's and Annie Lennox's "Put a Little Love in your Heart" is also played regularly at Christmas despite not being about or mentioning Christmas. O'Donoghue disavowed the film before his death, stating that the script was much funnier than what ended up on screen.

The review aggregation website Rotten Tomatoes offers a score of 72% based on 53 reviews—an average rating of 6.1/10, which provides the consensus: "Scrooged gets by with Bill Murray and a dash of holiday spirit, although it's hampered by a markedly conflicted tone and an undercurrent of mean-spiritedness." The film also has a score of 38 out of 100 on Metacritic based on 14 critics indicating "generally unfavorable reviews".

In 2015, IGN named it the 11th-best holiday movie of all time. In 2016, Empire listed Scrooged as the seventh-best Christmas film, and in 2017, Time Out and Consequence of Sound listed it as, respectively, the 12th-best and 23rd best. That same year, Collider named it the fifth-best adaptation of A Christmas Carol, calling it is easily the best non-traditional translation of the story, and saying that it uses "a classic tale of redemption as the framework for a satire of modern culture's desire to embrace the irredeemable".

In 2018, The Ringer said that even 30 years after its debut, the film represented the perfect Christmas movie, saying it is "loud, cartoonish, and misanthropic, but... remarkably well-suited for our fraught present moment". David Johansen's New York Dolls bandmate Arthur Kane was sent into a jealous rage after seeing Johansen's prominent role in Scrooged, reacting by beating his wife and attempting suicide by jumping from a third-story window.

== See also ==
- List of Christmas films
- List of ghost films
- Adaptations of A Christmas Carol
