= The Burning Glass =

The Burning Glass is a 1954 dramatic play by Charles Morgan.

== Plot ==
The Burning Glass tells the story of Christopher Terriford, a British scientist who discovers a new method of capturing solar energy. This "burning glass" can greatly benefit mankind, but it can also be used to wipe out distant targets with devastating flame, so like the atomic bomb it holds the potential to destroy mankind. Because of this, Terriford won't give his discovery to the British Government, instead depositing half the formula in a bank and the other half in his wife's memory.

Terriford and the British Prime Minister debate at the intersection of morality, patriotism, conscience, and necessity. Terriford – who wishes he could forget his discovery, but can't – tells the Prime Minister that the time has come for science to withhold knowledge as "we haven't developed at the same time our spiritual or our political qualities... We are like a monstrous giant... There can be a blasphemy of applied science. We have reached that point."

Then dark forces – perhaps Russian agents, but identified only as "The Enemy" – kidnap Terriford. But Terriford refuses to talk and is released. Meanwhile, his wife and associate have undertaken to recreate the burning glass in his absence. His associate, remorseful for having played an inadvertent part in provoking Terriford's kidnapping, fearful of being kidnapped next (and that he is too weak to guard the secret he now knows), and in love with Terriford's wife, commits suicide.

== Productions ==
=== West End ===
The Burning Glass opened at the Apollo Theatre in London's West End on 18 February 1954 and was a success. The production was directed by Michael Macowan with a cast including Michael Goodliffe, Dorothy Green, Faith Brook, Michael Gough, Robert Speaight, Basil Dignam, and Laurence Naismith. Ludovic Kennedy wrote of the play "Charles Morgan has written the play, not only of the year, but of the decade in which we live". Audrey Williamson wrote that "The plot... involves... a battle of will and conscience, as gripping as any scene of action, between the Prime Minister and the scientist" and "It is a play, with good acting, to fire the stage. And this, at the Apollo Theatre, it did", although "Michael Gough [as Terriford's associate] gave a performance that all but dominated the play. Yet he is not the protagonist, and he should not so dominate. That is the play's weakness, not the actor's. But it is a weakness."

Anthony Hartley of The Spectator was archly dismissive of the play's denouement, in which Terriford concedes to the British Government the right to use the burning glass for war in event of uttermost need – "Why not [to] the Russians?... [Terriford] presupposes that he knows who is bad and who is good in this complicated world... The presupposition is social: the one took your mother out to dances [in the play, the Prime Minister and Terriford's mother had dated], the other was educated half in Buda and half in Pest. To whom would you give the secret of the burning glass, chum?... all the characters except [the enemy agent] Hardlip devote themselves to proclaiming the unspoken assumptions of the English upper classes.... What purports to be a play of ideas conveys a country-house ethic of the necessity for having the right chaps in the right places... This solution solves nothing, excites no question, stimulates no reaction. It is not even dramatic. This is not what the theatre is for."

=== Broadway ===
After tryouts at the New Parsons Theatre in Hartford, Connecticut, The Burning Glass opened on Broadway at the Longacre Theatre on 4 March 1954. Players included Scott Forbes (as Christopher Terriford), Walter Matthau (as Terriford's associate), Isobel Elsom (as Terriford's wife), Cedric Hardwicke, and Maria Riva. According to Thomas Hischak, the Broadway production was "dismissed as claptrap" and it was not a success, closing after 28 performances on 27 March 1954.

=== Edinburgh ===
The play was staged by the Edinburgh Gateway Company in the autumn of 1954.

=== Revivals ===
Revivals have included a 1962 production at the Bromley Little Theatre outside London.
