= Maria Riva =

American actress (1924–2025)

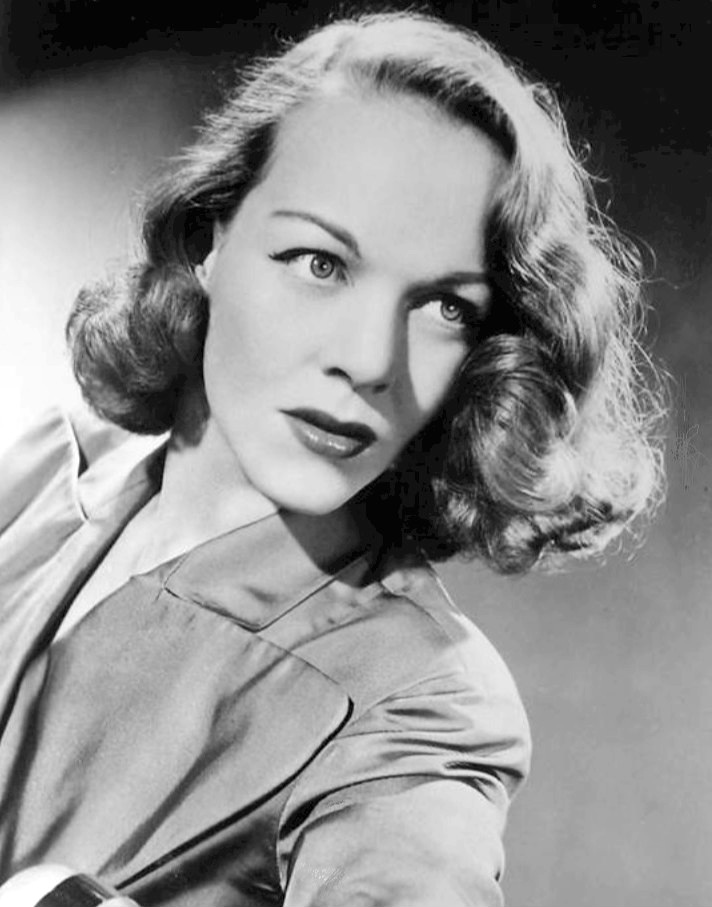
- Riva in 1951
- Born: Maria Elisabeth Sieber; December 13, 1924; Berlin, Germany
- Died: October 29, 2025 (aged 100); Gila, New Mexico, U.S.
- Occupations: Actress; author
- Years active: 1933–1988
- Spouses: Dean Goodman (m. 1943; div. 1944) William Riva (m. 1947; died 1999)
- Children: 4, including J. Michael Riva
- Mother: Marlene Dietrich

Maria Elisabeth Riva (née Sieber; December 13, 1924 – October 29, 2025) was an American actress and memoirist. The daughter of actress Marlene Dietrich, she worked on television at CBS in the 1950s, during which she received numerous television acting roles and was twice Emmy-nominated. She published a memoir on her mother in 1992.

== Early life ==
Maria Elisabeth Sieber was born in Berlin on December 13, 1924, the only child of actress Marlene Dietrich and assistant film director Rudolf Sieber (who was later Paramount Pictures' director of dubbing in Paris, France). In 1930, at age five, she moved with her mother to Los Angeles, California. She spent most of her time at home, on the Paramount Studios lot, and in the company of her mother's friends. In 1934, aged nine, she had a small role in Josef von Sternberg's film The Scarlet Empress, based on the life of Catherine the Great, in which she played Catherine, her mother's character, as a child. Since no young actress could be found who resembled her mother, she was given the part. In her scenes in the film she was filmed in bed because she was older in real life than the character she played. She was also an extra in the 1936 David O. Selznick production, The Garden of Allah.

In order for Dietrich to keep her daughter close to her, Riva was not permitted to attend school; instead she had governesses who saw to her education. Her mother relented in the late 1930s, allowing her to attend Brillantmont International School in Switzerland. During her time at Brillantmont, her roommate was actress Gene Tierney. During her childhood, she would often join the Kennedy family on vacation along with her mother; her mother was also acknowledged to have started a major, long-term extramarital affair with Kennedy family patriarch Joe Kennedy in 1938. Despite the six-year age difference between the two, she became good friends with Rosemary Kennedy, saying of their friendship, "Perhaps being two misfits, we felt comfortable in each other's company".

In her biography about her mother, she describes the childhood conditions and effects of a rape at age thirteen by a nanny. She wrote, "In some ways I was trained for rape. Always obedient, always trying to please those in charge of me." Riva has also alleged that she was raped by her governess at the age of 15.

== Career ==
=== Acting career ===
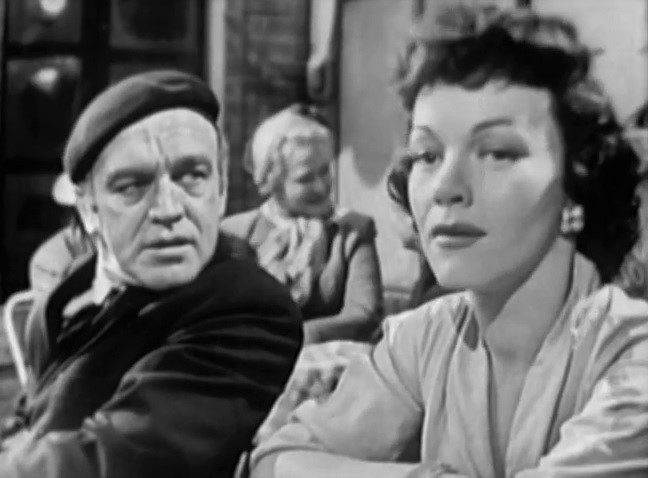
Herbert Berghof and Maria Riva in the Suspense episode "Death Drum" (1952)

At the age of 15, Riva received acting training at the Max Reinhardt Academy and during the Second World War entertained Allied troops in Europe for the USO from 1945 to 1946, stationed in Frankfurt am Main, Germany. In the early 1940s, she briefly went by the stage name Maria Manton. She also acted in theatre and summer stock, including a production of Tea and Sympathy. She appeared at the Longacre Theatre on Broadway in the 1954 production The Burning Glass, opposite Cedric Hardwicke and Walter Matthau.

In the early years of television, the major television networks of the time tried to build their own stable of actors in the same fashion as the film studios. In 1951, Riva was signed to CBS as a contract player receiving a salary of $250 per week. That long-term contract was ended "by 'mutual agreement'" in the summer of 1952.

Whilst under contract to CBS, Riva not only acted in television productions, she also appeared in television commercials promoting Alcoa, as well as appearing in print advertisements for Rheingold Beer.

During the medium's early days of live, kinescope broadcasts, Riva showed to be one of the top television personalities.

During the 1950s, Riva appeared in more than 500 live teleplays for CBS, all broadcast from New York, including The Milton Berle Show, Lux Video Theatre, Hallmark Hall of Fame, Your Show of Shows, and Studio One. She received Emmy nominations as best actress in both 1952 and 1953.

In a January 1953 issue of Motion Picture Daily, Riva was named as one of "Television's Best of 1952" alongside fellow television stars Sid Caesar, Lucille Ball, Dinah Shore, Kate Smith, and others.

In 1962, having retired from acting, Riva moved to Bern, Switzerland, with her husband and four sons, dividing her time between a home in New York, purchased for her by her mother in 1948, and their home in Switzerland. Riva then devoted much of the 1960s to organizing her mother's one-woman shows. Riva appeared as Mrs. Rhinelander—the wife of Robert Mitchum's character—in Bill Murray's 1988 film Scrooged. In 2001, she was interviewed for Her Own Song, a documentary about her mother.

In 2018, Riva returned to acting, starring in a short-film entitled All Aboard, directed by her grandson J. Michael Riva, Jr.

=== Writing ===
Riva's biography of her mother, Marlene Dietrich, was published in 1992, the year of Dietrich's death. The book was well received and went on to become a New York Times Best Seller.

Riva contributed the captions to the 2001 book, Marlene Dietrich: Photographs and Memories; From the Marlene Dietrich Collection of the FilmMuseum Berlin, which consists of previously unseen images of her mother. In 2005, Riva edited a volume of Dietrich's poetry, Nachtgedanken, which was published in Germany and Italy.

Riva published her first novel, You Were There Before My Eyes: A Novel, in 2017. The novel is about a woman who leaves her Italian village and enters a new world as an immigrant in Detroit.

In 2017, Riva also published the 25th anniversary edition of the biography of her mother, re-titled Marlene Dietrich: The Life.

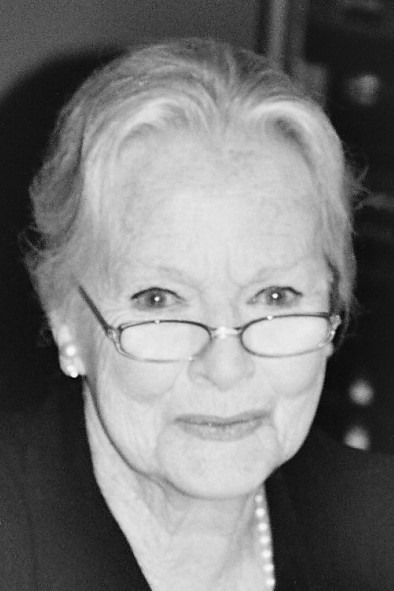
Riva in 2005

== Personal life ==
In early 1943, Riva was briefly engaged to actor Richard Haydn; however, that same year she married actor Dean Goodman, whom she divorced in 1944. In the summer of 1947, while teaching a graduate course in acting and directing at Fordham University, she met her second husband, scenic designer William Riva, and they married on July 4. They remained married for over 50 years until his death in July 1999. They had four sons together, including production designer J. Michael Riva. Her second son, Peter Riva, president and owner of International Transactions, alongside his wife Sandra found some success as a literary agent, beginning in 1975.

Riva maintained friendships with many of her mother's friends and associates, including Brian Aherne, Jean Gabin, Edward R. Murrow, and Yul Brynner, with whom she participated in telethons to benefit United Cerebral Palsy during the 1950s.

However, Riva had a very strained relationship with her mother, who she stated was a cruel, manipulative narcissist who sought to use her to boost her own legacy rather than love her as if she were her child. When discussing her biography Marlene Dietrich in 1992, Riva stated "I consider myself a biographer, not the daughter." She said it was very difficult "to be a child of an ephemeral creature that is beyond normalcy."

At a young age, Riva developed a drinking problem. However, despite even later appearing in beer print advertisements in the early 1950s, Riva had in fact stopped drinking alcohol since the short time following her 1944 divorce.

On September 14, 1993, more than a year after her mother's death, Riva sold the bulk of her mother's estate to the city of Berlin to be housed in the then soon-to-be-opening Deutsche Kinemathek for $5 million. The Marlene Dietrich Collection was initially reported to have included 100,000 possessions; diaries, books, costumes, traveling trunks, and memorabilia. Riva cited her desire to keep the collection together as reason for selling the collection to the city of Berlin to be maintained and displayed in the Deutsche Kinemathek. Riva's son, Peter, said "We chose Berlin, because they are committed to preserving each piece in the collection, which will be part of a new museum complex with the collection as part of its core." However, it was later revealed that the collection also included more items, including over 3,000 textile items from the 1920s to the 1990s, including film and stage costumes as well as over a thousand items from Dietrich's personal wardrobe; 15,000 photographs, by Sir Cecil Beaton, Horst P. Horst, George Hurrell, Lord Snowdon, and Edward Steichen; 300,000 pages of documents, including correspondence with Burt Bacharach, Yul Brynner, Maurice Chevalier, Noël Coward, Jean Gabin, Ernest Hemingway, Karl Lagerfeld, Nancy and Ronald Reagan, Erich Maria Remarque, Josef von Sternberg, Orson Welles, and Billy Wilder; as well as other items like film posters and sound recordings.

In 1993, Riva stated to People that she was raped at the age of 15 by her governess, a secret she kept from her mother due to the fact that she felt her mother "wouldn't believe me". According to Riva, her mother "had this ability to mentally erase anything she didn’t like to hear. I’ve never been judgmental of that woman who raped me. But I do blame [my mother], who made it possible for [that woman] to take what was placed before her.”

In June 2012, her son Michael died, aged 63, following a stroke.

Riva primarily lived in Palm Springs, California, but eventually moved into her son Peter's home in Gila, New Mexico, in 2024. She turned 100 on December 13 of that year, and died in her sleep in Gila on October 29, 2025.

== Selected filmography ==
Year	Title	Role
1928	Die glückliche Mutter	Maria Riva as a Child
1934	The Scarlet Empress	Sophia as a Child
1936	The King Steps Out	Girl Playing Violin
1936	The Garden of Allah	Young Girl Sewing
1988	Scrooged	Mrs. Rhinelander

== Stage appearances ==
Date	Title	Theatre	Notes
March 13, 1945 – June 9, 1945	Foolish Notion	Al Hirschfeld Theatre, New York City	Played Flora & Elsie
March 4, 1954 – March 27, 1954	The Burning Glass	Longacre Theatre, New York City	Played Mary Terriford
1956	Tea and Sympathy	Various	National tour

== Works ==
- Riva, Maria (1992). Marlene Dietrich. Ballantine Books. ISBN 0-345-38645-0.
- Riva, Maria (2001). Marlene Dietrich: Photographs and Memories. Thames & Hudson Ltd. ISBN 0-500-51071-7.
- Dietrich, Marlene (2005). Riva, Maria (ed.). Nachtgedanken. C. Bertelsmann. ISBN 978-3-570-00874-4.
- Riva, Maria (2017). You Were There Before My Eyes: A Novel. W.W. Norton & Company Ltd. ISBN 978-1-68177-507-4.

== Awards and nominations ==
Year	Organization	Category	Work	Result	Ref.
1952	Primetime Emmy Awards	Best Actress	—N/a	Nominated	
1953	Primetime Emmy Awards	Best Actress	—N/a	Nominated	

== See also ==
- List of centenarians (actors, filmmakers and entertainers)
