= Heaven in Your Arms =

Single by Dan Hartman

from the album It Hurts to Be in Love
- Released: February 1981
- Length: 3:34
- Label: Blue Sky
- Songwriter: Dan Hartman
- Producer: Dan Hartman

Dan Hartman singles chronology
"Hands Down" (1979)	"Heaven in Your Arms" (1981)	"It Hurts to Be in Love" (1981)

"Heaven in Your Arms" is a song by the American musician Dan Hartman, released in 1981 as the first single from his fourth studio album It Hurts to Be in Love. It was written and produced by Hartman.

"Heaven in Your Arms" peaked at No. 86 on the Billboard Hot 100 and would be Hartman's last appearance on the chart until 1984. The song, like the entire It Hurts to Be in Love album, was recorded at the Schoolhouse, mixed at Power Station and mastered at Sterling Sound. The Schoolhouse was Hartman's own home studio in Connecticut.

== Release ==
"Heaven in Your Arms" was released by Blue Sky on 7" vinyl in North America only. It was distributed and manufactured by CBS Records. Two variations of the single saw two different B-sides; "Forever in a Moment" and "Hello Again", both of which were taken from It Hurts to Be in Love. A promotional edition of the single was also issued, featuring "Heaven in Your Arms" on both sides of the vinyl.

== Promotion ==
A music video was filmed to promote the single, which was produced by Hartman's friend Jerry King Musser, who also took the photographs for the It Hurts to Be in Love album. The video was presumed lost until 2010, when Musser discovered part of the original video on a VHS tape and made it available through YouTube and Vimeo. In December 2014, the entire video was discovered by Musser's wife Janette, and digitized, before being uploaded on YouTube.

For Hartman's unofficial fan site, Musser spoke of the video: "I remember that we shot the whole thing in less than a day in an old unused department store in downtown Harrisburg. The budget was something incredibly cheap. One of the biggest costs was having large Levelor "venetian" blinds made for the shoot. The whole piece was shot with these window blinds with red, black, and silver being the colors used to attempt some form of design into it. I had one sound guy who kept playing the song back for Danny to lip sync to, and one assistant, and me. I always felt it very kind of Danny to have even asked me to do it. Of course, I didn't get rich on it but that wasn't the point for me then either. I loved doing it for him." On the Vimeo upload, Musser added: "Shot in an afternoon, but Danny made it fun. Shot, I believe, on an Arriflex BL, 16mm film. Nagra recorder playback for lip sync. Edited, probably, on a Steenbeck."

== Critical reception ==
Upon release, Cash Box commented: "Hartman has been tagged principally as a disco artist. This transition record, an expertly produced mid-tempo pop/MOR ballad, has all the earmarks of a Top 40 hit, though. The sublime vocals, layered with particular care, should make it a pop, A/C killer." In a review of It Hurts to Be in Love, Stereo Review said: "Unexpectedly mainstream pop, it reveals [Hartman] as a balladeer in the Sixties tradition but with musical energy that's definitely of today. Listen, for example, to "Heaven in Your Arms" and "Letter in a Song", big soft-rock arrangements of pretty, standard ballads — uncomplicated, romantic, filled with autobiographical details. They are very well sung, with feeling and honesty."

== Track listing ==
7" single

1. "Heaven in Your Arms" - 3:34
2. "Hello Again" - 4:23

7" single

1. "Heaven in Your Arms" - 3:34
2. "Forever in a Moment" - 3:12

7" single (promo)

1. "Heaven in Your Arms" - 3:34
2. "Heaven in Your Arms" - 3:34

== Chart performance ==
Chart (1981)	Peak position
U.S. Billboard Hot 100 Singles Chart	86

== Personnel ==
- Dan Hartman - vocals, acoustic guitar, producer, recording
- Erik Cartwright – guitar
- John Pierce - bass
- Art Wood - drums
- Jeff Bova - synthesizer
- Neil Dorfsman - mixing
- Barry Bongiovi, Dave Greenberg, James Farber, Ray Willhard - assistant engineers, mixing
- Jeff Jones - recording
- Steve Paul, Teddy Slatus - management, coordinators
