= Images (Dan Hartman album) =

Studio album by Dan Hartman
- Released: 1976
- Genres: Pop, rock
- Length: 38:53
- Label: Blue Sky
- Producer: Dan Hartman

Dan Hartman chronology
Who Is Dan Hartman? (1976)	Images (1976)	Instant Replay (1978)

Images is Dan Hartman's second full-length release but his first album of new material. It features an interesting mix of players to assist the multi-instrumentalist continue his pop rock themes featured in his tenure with the Edgar Winter Group and fittingly has Edgar Winter, Rick Derringer and Ronnie Montrose as guests. Montrose appears on two songs which was in exchange for the two Hartman written songs, "What are You Waiting For?" and "Rich Man", that appeared on Jump On It, the same year. Drummer John Wilcox and bassist John Siegler, both of Utopia, were the principal rhythm section.

Other guests include Clarence Clemons, Randy Brecker, Hartman's father Carl, and from his hometown band The Legends, drummer Larry Sadler. Supplying background vocals on two songs was RSO Records' soul group, Revelation.

Continuing themes heard on They Only Come Out at Night, Hartman follows up with two Montrose‑assisted straight‑ahead rockers. “High Sign” sounds like the son of “Free Ride,” with Ronnie supplying a revving sports‑car tone reminiscent of “Bad Motor Scooter.” “The Party’s in the Back Room” has the party continuing from “We All Had a Real Good Time.” Both tracks were released together as a single on Blue Sky Records, with “High Sign” as the A‑side and “Party’s in the Back Room” as the B‑side. A second single, “Lighthouse,” was released in 1977 as a promotional single on Blue Sky Records." Neither of these singles charted.

"Alta Mira"'s reggae flavor resurfaces on "Love It Too Much". The soothing acoustic sounds of "Autumn" echo back on "Thank You for the Good Times" and "My Love". Newer soul and R&B sounds appear on "If Only I Were Stronger" and "Can't Stand in the Way of Love" while "Shake It Down", with great sax by Clarence Clemons, is a precursor to the dance sounds soon to follow on Instant Replay. "Shake It Down" appears on the collection Super Hits (2004).

== Track listing ==
All songs written by Dan Hartman: except "Hear My Song" which was written by Dan Hartman and Edgar Winter

1. "Hear My Song" (3:13)
2. "High Sign" (3:17)
3. "On the Telephone" (4:18)
4. "Thank You for the Good Times" (3:03)
5. "Lighthouse" (2:58)
6. "My Love" (3:57)
7. "Shake It Down" (3:53)
8. "Love It Too Much" (2:58)
9. "If Only I Were Stronger" (4:30)
10. "Can't Stand in the Way of Love" (3:44)
11. "The Party's in the Back Room" (3:12)

== Personnel ==
- Dan Hartman - lead & backing vocals, guitars, keyboards, percussion, bass on 4, kalimba on 8, everything except lead guitar on 2
- John "Willie" Wilcox - drums, percussion on 1, 3–10
- John Siegler - bass on 1, 3, 5–10
- Ronnie Montrose - lead guitar on 2 and 11
- Rick Derringer - acoustic lead and rhythm guitars on 4
- Carl Hartman - whistling on 4
- Clarence Clemons - saxophone on 7
- Revelation - background vocals on 7 and 8
- Tom Strohman - flutes on 9
- Randy Brecker, George Young, Tony Pagano, Edgar Winter - horns on 10
- Larry Sadler - drums on 11
- Joe Abbondanza - bass on 11

- Alan Shulman, Alfred Brown, Gene Orloff, Jesse Levy, Julien Barber, Tony Posk - strings

Production

- Produced by Dan Hartman
- Strings arranged and conducted by Dan Hartman
- Sound by Dave Still
- Mixed by Dave Still and Dan Hartman
