= Every Dog Has Her Day!!! =

1990 album by Denise Lopez

Studio album by Denise Lopez
- Released: 1990
- Length: 46:18
- Label: A&M
- Producers: David Bowler; Howard Bowler; John Morales; Oliver Leiber; Billy Biddle; David Z.

Denise Lopez chronology
Truth in Disguise (1988)	Every Dog Has Her Day!!! (1990)

Every Dog Has Her Day!!! is the second studio album by American singer Denise Lopez, released by A&M in 1990. The album's various producers include David and Howard Bowler, John Morales, Oliver Leiber, Billy Biddle and David Z.

The album's only single, "Don't You Wanna Be Mine", reached No. 86 on the Billboard Hot 100 and No. 69 on Billboard Radio Songs chart. Although it never received a full commercial release in the UK, the song became a popular song on the country's dance scene, largely due to a remix from the production duo Robert Clivillas and David Cole, better known as C+C Music Factory.

In 1991, the song "I Want U 2 Know" was included in the romantic musical comedy film Cool as Ice, starring Vanilla Ice and Kristin Minter. The track was one of the main themes of the film, played during the Kristin Minter scenes, however was not included on the official soundtrack album.

== Critical reception ==
Professional ratings
Review scores
Source	Rating
AllMusic	3/5 stars
Billboard	mixed

Upon release, Billboard wrote: "Lopez is a sassy singer who delivers on the money most of the time, but her work is too often sabotaged by sound-alike production that is infecting many dance records these days. Still, she's at her best on up-tempo tracks, and both "Don't You Wanna Be Mine" and "Causa U" have a good shot on the floor."

In a retrospective review, Justin Kantor of AllMusic described the album as "more versatile than her first - if not as consistent". He stated: "She shows she is equally comfortable with pop-dance workouts, moody ballads, and midtempo funk romps. But it's the trio of ballads that do the trick best. Some of the uptempo ditties are too heavily produced and, combined with the singer's no-holds-barred delivery, come across as caustic and harsh."

== Track listing ==
No.	Title	Writer(s)	Length
1.	"Don't You Wanna Be Mine"	Ted Jacobs, Michael Jay	4:53
2.	"Communicate"	Allee Willis, Oliver Leiber	4:38
3.	"Causa U"	Eric Li, Howard Bowler	4:26
4.	"Land of the Living"	Joe Ericksen, Lenny Macaluso, Peter Bunetta	4:52
5.	"Love Come Down"	Anton McIlwain, David A. Brooks, Tony Fennelle	4:53
6.	"It's Just My Heart That's Breakin"	Leiber	4:47
7.	"Loving You A to Z"	Claude Gaudette, Jay	5:19
8.	"I Want U 2 Know"	Billy Biddle, Denise Lopez	4:24
9.	"Layin' Down the Law"	Michael Price, Richard Scher	3:58
10.	"Everlasting Love"	Lopez, Lenny Macaluso, Richard Bell	4:04

== Personnel ==
- Denise Lopez - vocals, backing vocals, vocal arrangements (tracks 3, 8)
- Dave Gellis - guitar (tracks 1, 4)
- David Grant - keyboards (tracks 1, 3–4)
- Oliver Leiber - keyboards (tracks 2, 6), guitar (tracks 2, 6), bass (track 2)
- Jeff Lorber - additional keyboards (tracks 2, 6), piano (track 6)
- St. Paul - additional keyboards (track 2), electric bass (track 6), backing vocals (track 6), guitar (track 10)
- David Bowler - keyboards (track 3), live drum loops (track 3)
- Howard Bowler - guitar (tracks 3, 5)
- Edward Douglas, The Piston Heaves, Lenny DeRose - backing vocals (track 3)
- John Morales - backing vocals (tracks 3, 7), keyboards (tracks 5, 7)
- Benny Diggs, Connie Harvey, Jocelyn Brown - backing vocals (track 4)
- Bruce Deshazer, Marv Gunn - backing vocals (track 6)
- Billy Biddle - keyboards (track 8)
- Ricky P. - keyboards (tracks 9–10), bass (tracks 9–10), backing vocals (track 10)
- David Z. - drums (track 9), percussion (tracks 9–10)
- Fred Steele, J.D. Steele - backing vocals (track 9)
- Joe Sample - piano (track 10)
- Gordy Knudtson - drums (track 10)
- Howard Arthur - backing vocals (track 10)

Production

- David Bowler - producer (tracks 1, 3–4), programming (track 3)
- Howard Bowler - producer (tracks 1, 3–4)
- John Morales - producer (tracks 1, 3–5, 7–8), programming (tracks 1, 4–5, 7), mixing (tracks 4, 8), digital editing
- Lenny DeRose - mixing (tracks 1, 3–5, 7–8), recording (tracks 1, 3–5, 7–8)
- Edward Douglas - assistant engineer (tracks 1, 3–5, 7–8)
- David "Jaz" Grant - programming (tracks 1, 4, 7), additional programming (track 3)
- Oliver Leiber - producer (tracks 2, 6), drum programming (tracks 2, 6), arranger (tracks 2, 6)
- Chuck Zwicky, Jeff Lorber - engineers (tracks 2, 6)
- John Chamberlin - assistant engineer (tracks 2, 6)
- Alan Meyerson - mixing (tracks 2, 6)
- Peter Martinsen - engineer (track 6)
- Billy Biddle - producer (track 8), programming (track 8)
- David Z. - producer (tracks 9–10), mixing (tracks 9–10), recording (tracks 9–10)
- Ricky P. - associate producer (tracks 9–10)
- Tom Garneau - assistant engineer (tracks 9–10)
- Tom Coyne - mastering

Other

- Steve Ralbovsky - executive producer
- F Ron Miller, Len Peltier - art direction, design
- Peggy Sirota - photography
- Bill Hart - illustration
