= The Love You Take =

Single by Dan Hartman & Denise Lopez

from the album Scrooged (soundtrack)
- B-side: "If You Feel It"
- Released: December 17, 1988
- Genre: Pop
- Length: 4:21
- Label: A&M Records
- Songwriter: Dan Hartman
- Producer: Dan Hartman

Dan Hartman singles chronology
| "Waiting to See You" (1986) | "The Love You Take" (1988) | "Keep the Fire Burnin'" (1994) |

Denise Lopez singles chronology
| "Too Much Too Late" (1988) | "The Love You Take" (1988) | "Don't You Wanna Be Mine" (1990) |

"The Love You Take" is a duet song by American musician-singer-songwriter Dan Hartman and freestyle\dance singer Denise Lopez. As part of the official soundtrack for the 1988 comedy film Scrooged, starring Bill Murray, it would be released as a single. The song was written and produced by Hartman.

== Background ==
By the late 1980s, Hartman focused on production and writing material for other artists; however, he contributed the occasional solo performance for movie soundtracks such as "The Love You Take". Although his usual songwriter partner was Charlie Midnight beginning around 1983, this song was solely written by Hartman. At the time, Lopez was signed to A&M Records, and would record two solo album for the label before disappearing from the music scene in the early 1990s. She would achieve success earlier in the year of 1988 with songs such as "Saying Sorry (Don't Make it Right)" (#1 on Billboard's Hot Dance Music) and "If You Feel It".

From the soundtrack, Annie Lennox and Al Green would find success with "Put A Little Love in Your Heart", which reached #9 in the US, and was a top 40 hit in several countries worldwide. "The Love You Take" was commercially released for the public to purchase and also featured in promotional only formats. The single made an appearance on the US Cash Box Top 100 Singles Chart - a weekly music magazine publication. It peaked at #75, lasting for seven weeks in the chart. The single reached its peak on December 17, 1988.

In the March 7, 1989 edition of the Mohave Daily Miner, Hartman was interviewed by Mary Campbell. When it came to speaking about the various songs that he has contributed to film soundtracks, Hartman admitted the following:

"I wish they'd snap out of having rock songs in films to try and sell the film, and go back to writing good scripts and making good films. I think ultimately they don't care about songs anyway. I got tired of cranking out pop songs that end up over the credits at the end. It's territory I moved through and don't want to do anymore."

"The Love You Take" was one of the last songs Hartman would perform and contribute to a film soundtrack. The song features Pat Thrall on guitar. Having worked with Hartman at his Connecticut home studio on Tina Turner's 1989 album Foreign Affair, Thrall returned to Hartman's studio again to record the guitar for "The Love You Take". As Thrall recalled,

"He told me after Tina's album he was going to take a break for a while and get his health together. I didn't realize at the time he had AIDS. He passed way too soon. He was a sweetheart of a guy and an amazing talent. Actually I came back one more time and played on a record he did for The Scrooge Movie with Bill Murray."

== Release ==
The single was released on 7" vinyl, 12" vinyl and CD single via A&M Records in America only. The 7" vinyl release was the only commercially available format to purchase, and it featured Lopez's hit dance chart song "If You Feel It" as the B-Side, taken from her Truth in Disguise debut album. On the 12" vinyl, "The Love You Take" featured on both sides of the vinyl, whilst the CD single featured just the sole one track. Only the CD single featured artwork - a simple purple background with text highlighting the film's title, with the song's title and artists underneath.

== Track listing ==
7" Single

1. "The Love You Take" - 4:21
2. "If You Feel It" - 3:52

12" Single (promo)

1. "The Love You Take" - 4:21
2. "The Love You Take" - 4:21

CD Single (promo)

1. "The Love You Take" - 4:21

== Critical reception ==
Heather Phares of Allmusic reviewed the Scrooged soundtrack album, and stated the following:

"The soundtrack to 'Scrooged' features updates on Christmas classics as well as original material by Dan Hartman and Denise Love [sic], Mark Lennon, Robbie Robertson, and Buster Poindexter. The album's sound, as well as its roster of artists, give it the feel of a time capsule buried in the late '80s, for better or worse. Most of the album brings back bad memories of the cold, brassy sound that dominated the decade's pop. Though "Scrooged" may appeal to fans of the movie, they may be taken aback by how badly the soundtrack has aged."

== Personnel ==
- Dan Hartman - vocals, producer, writer
- Denise Lopez - vocals
- Pat Thrall - guitar

== Charts ==
| Chart (1988) | Peak position |
|---|---|
| US Cash Box Top 100 Singles Chart | 75 |
