= The Scarlet Empress =

1934 film by Josef von Sternberg

- Theatrical release poster
- Directed by: Josef von Sternberg
- Screenplay by: Manuel Komroff (diary arranger); Eleanor McGeary
- Based on: The diary of Catherine the Great
- Produced by: Emanuel Cohen; Josef von Sternberg
- Starring: Marlene Dietrich; John Lodge; Sam Jaffe; Louise Dresser
- Cinematography: Bert Glennon
- Edited by: Josef von Sternberg; Sam Winston
- Music by: W. Franke Harling; John Leipold
- Distributed by: Paramount Pictures
- Release date: September 15, 1934
- Running time: 104 minutes
- Country: United States
- Language: English
- Budget: $900,000

The Scarlet Empress is a 1934 American historical drama film starring Marlene Dietrich and John Lodge about the life of Catherine the Great. It was directed and produced by Josef von Sternberg from a screenplay by Eleanor McGeary, loosely based on the diary of Catherine arranged by Manuel Komroff. The film stars Dietrich as Catherine, supported by Lodge, Sam Jaffe, Louise Dresser, and C. Aubrey Smith. Dietrich's daughter Maria Riva plays Catherine as a child.

Even though substantial historical liberties are taken, the film is viewed positively by modern critics. The Scarlet Empress is particularly notable for its attentive lighting and the expressionist art design that von Sternberg created for the Russian palace.

== Plot ==
Princess Sophia Frederica is the daughter of a minor East Prussian prince. Count Alexei brings her to Russia at the behest of Empress Elizabeth to marry her nephew Grand Duke Peter. Elizabeth renames her Catherine and demands that the new bride produce a male heir to the throne, which is impossible because Peter never comes near her after their wedding night. He spends all of his time with his mistress, his toy soldiers or his real soldiers. Alexei pursues Catherine without success. At dinner, he tries to pass a note to Catherine asking her to meet him later, but Elizabeth intercepts it.

That night, Elizabeth sends Catherine down a secret stairway to open the door for a lover, warning her to not let him see her. Catherine sees that the man is Alexei and, shaken and angry, hurls a miniature that he had given her out the window. She enters the garden to retrieve it and is stopped by Lieutenant Dmitri, who is on guard duty for the first time. When Catherine mentions who she is, he initially does not believe her and begins to flirt with her. The two eventually have sex. Months later, all of Russia, with the exception of Peter, celebrates as Catherine gives birth to a son. Elizabeth takes charge of the boy's care and sends Catherine a necklace.

Elizabeth is in failing health. Peter plans to remove Catherine from court, perhaps by killing her. However, Catherine has become self-assured and cynical. She has devoted herself to learning how things work in Russia and is unwilling to be preempted. The archimandrite is worried by the thought of Peter on the throne and offers Catherine his help, but she demurs, saying that she has "weapons that are far more powerful than any political machine" he can mobilize. Although the nation has been commanded to be in deep prayer for the dying Elizabeth, Catherine plays blind man's bluff with her ladies in waiting and lavishes kisses on the assembled soldiers. As the bells toll for Elizabeth's passing, Peter taunts Elizabeth's corpse as she lies in state, saying that it is now his turn to rule.

An intertitle reads: "And while his Imperial Majesty Peter the III terrorized Russia, Catherine coolly added the army to her list of conquests." Catherine inspects the officers of Alexei's pet regiment, singling out Lieutenant Dmitri by borrowing one of Alexei's decorations to reward him for bravery. Orlov, Dmitri's captain, also attracts her attention. That evening, Catherine, who had refused to see Alexi privately since she admitted him to Elizabeth's quarters, permits him to visit her. When they are alone in her bedroom, she toys with him before sending him down the secret stairway to open the door for the man waiting there. He sees Captain Orlov and understands that his chance for a relationship with Catherine has passed.

At dinner, the archimandrite collects alms for the poor. Catherine strips her arm of bracelets, Orlov donates some gems, Alexei gives a purse full of coins, the chancellor adds a single coin and Peter's mistress tosses a scrap of food onto the plate, which the archimandrite removes. When asked for his donation, Peter slaps the archimandrite's face and claims there are no poor in Russia. He then proposes a toast to his mistress, but Catherine refuses to participate. Peter calls her a fool, and she leaves with Orlov. Peter strips Orlov of his rank and dismisses him from military service. He then places Catherine under house arrest, obscuring it by issuing a public proclamation that she is dying.

In the middle of the night Orlov sneaks into Catherine's room and wakes her. Dressed in a soldier's uniform, she flees the palace with her loyal troops. Alexei sees her depart and murmurs: "Exit Peter the Third, enter Catherine the Second." She rides through the night, gathering men to her cause. In the cathedral, the archimandrite blesses Catherine, and she rings the bell that signals the start of the coup. Peter awakens and opens his door, finding Orlov standing guard. Orlov says "There is no emperor. There is only an empress" and kills him. Catherine and her troops ride up the stairs in the palace, thundering into the throne room as pealing bells are joined by the 1812 Overture. Her rule is secure.

== Cast ==
- Marlene Dietrich as Princess Sophie Friederike Auguste von Anhalt-Zerbst-Dornburg, later Empress Catherine II
- John Lodge as Count Alexey Razumovsky
- Sam Jaffe as Grand Duke Peter, later Emperor Peter III
- Louise Dresser as Empress Elizaveta Petrovna
- C. Aubrey Smith as Christian August, Prince of Anhalt-Zerbst, father of Catherine
- Gavin Gordon as Captain Grigory Grigoryevich Orlov
- Olive Tell as Joanna Elisabeth of Holstein-Gottorp, mother of Catherine
- Ruthelma Stevens as Elizaveta Vorontsova, mistress of Peter III
- Davison Clark as Archimandrite Simeon Todorsky / Arch-Episcopope
- Erville Alderson as Chancellor Alexey Bestuzhev-Ryumin
- Philip Sleeman as Jean Armand de Lestocq, the court physician
- Marie Wells as Marie Tshoglokof, one of Catherine's ladies-in-waiting
- Hans Heinrich von Twardowski as Ivan Shuvalov, Empress Elizabeth's paramour
- Gerald Fielding as Lieutenant Dimitri
- Maria Riva as Sophia (as a child)

Jaffe's role was his first in a feature film.

== Production ==
Director Josef von Sternberg described The Scarlet Empress as "a relentless excursion into style," and historical accuracy is sacrificed in the film for its style. To show Russia as backward, anachronistic and in need of reform, the imperial court was set at the Kremlin in Moscow, rather than in Saint Petersburg, which was a more European city. The royal palaces in the film are shown as made of wood and full of religious sculptures, but free-standing religious sculpture is not part of the Orthodox tradition. Pete Babusch from Switzerland created hundreds of gargoyle-like sculptures of male figures "crying, screaming, or in throes of misery" that "line the hallways, decorate the royal thrones, and even appear on serving dishes." This resulted in "the most extreme of all of the cinematic representations of Russia." In film critic Robin Wood's words:

A hyperrealist atmosphere of nightmare with its gargoyles, its grotesque figures twisted into agonized contortions, its enormous doors that require a half-dozen women to close or open, its dark spaces and ominous shadows created by the flickerings of innumerable candles, its skeleton presiding over the royal wedding banquet table.

The Scarlet Empress was one of the later mainstream Hollywood films to be released before the Hays Code was strictly enforced. Near the beginning of the film, young Sophia's tutor reads to her about Peter the Great, Ivan the Terrible and other ruthless czars, introducing an explicit montage of tortures and executions that includes several brief shots of women with exposed breasts.

== Reception ==
On the review aggregator website Rotten Tomatoes, The Scarlet Empress has an 87% approval rating based on 30 reviews.

In 1998, Jonathan Rosenbaum of the Chicago Reader included the film in his unranked list of the best American films not included on the AFI Top 100.

Leonard Maltin gives the picture three out of four stars: "Von Sternberg tells the story ... in uniquely ornate fashion, with stunning lighting and camerawork and fiery Russian music. It's a visual orgy; dramatically uneven, but cinematically fascinating."

In a 2001 review of the film for the Criterion Collection, film scholar Robin Wood placed it in the context of the collaboration between Sternberg and Dietrich:

The connecting theme of all the von Sternberg/Dietrich films might be expressed as a question: How does a woman, and at what cost, assert herself within an overwhelmingly male-dominated world? Each film offers a somewhat different answer (but none very encouraging), steadily evolving into the extreme pessimism and bitterness of The Scarlet Empress and achieving its apotheosis in their final collaboration The Devil Is a Woman. This resulted in the (today extraordinary) misreading of the films (starting from The Blue Angel) as "films about a woman who destroys men." Indeed, one might assert that it is only with the advent of radical feminism that the films (and especially the last two) have become intelligible.

In 2006, The New York Times' reviewer Dave Kehr described the film, with its "metaphysical treatment" of the subject, as clearly superior to the contemporaneous The Rise of Catherine the Great (1934), which was directed by Paul Czinner and produced by Alexander Korda.

In 2008, The Guardian's historical films reviewer Alex von Tunzelmann credits the film with "racy" entertainment value (grade: "B"), but she discredits its historical depth and accuracy (grade: "D−"), giving the film historical credence only for creating a "vaguely accurate impression" of Catherine's relationship with Peter, dismissing the rest as stemming from the director's fantasies and infatuations.
