= It Hurts to Be in Love =

1964 single by Gene Pitney

Single by Gene Pitney

from the album It Hurts to Be in Love and Eleven More Hit Songs
- B-side: "Hawaii"
- Released: July 1964
- Recorded: 1964
- Genre: Rock and roll, pop
- Length: 2:34
- Label: Musicor Records
- Songwriters: Howard Greenfield, Helen Miller

Gene Pitney singles chronology
| "Gene Italiano" (1964) | "It Hurts to Be in Love" (1964) | "I'm Gonna Be Strong" (1964) |

"It Hurts to Be in Love" is a song written by Howard Greenfield and Helen Miller which was a Top Ten hit in 1964 for Gene Pitney. It was one in a long line of successful "Brill Building Sound" hits created by composers and arrangers working in New York City's Brill Building at 1619 Broadway.

The song has been covered by many other artists. In 1981, Dan Hartman recorded a version which peaked at No. 72 on the Billboard Hot 100.

This "It Hurts to Be in Love" is not to be confused with a similarly titled tune, co-written by Julius Dixson and Rudy Toombs, first recorded by Annie Laurie on De Luxe Records (1957), and subsequently recorded by Frankie Lymon, and Trini Lopez, among others.

== Gene Pitney version ==
"It Hurts to Be in Love" was originally intended to be sung by Howard Greenfield's long-running songwriting partner Neil Sedaka, but Sedaka's record label at the time, RCA Victor, refused to release Sedaka's new recording because he had not recorded it in their studios, as stipulated by his contract. Sedaka attempted another recording of this song in RCA's studios, but the results were unsatisfactory. Greenfield and Helen Miller, the song's co-writers, offered it to Gene Pitney instead, and he took the existing musical track, replacing Sedaka's lead vocal track with Pitney's own. Everything else was Sedaka's, including his own arrangement and backing vocals, piano-playing, and usual female backup singers. Pitney ended up with a top ten hit in the Billboard Hot 100 for himself and his record label, Musicor, in 1964. The personnel on the original recording included Artie Kaplan on saxophone, Bill Suyker, Charles Macy, and Vinnie Bell on guitar, Milt Hinton on bass, Artie Butler on organ, Gary Chester on drums, and Toni Wine on backing vocals.

In the US, "It Hurts to Be in Love" spent 16 weeks on the Billboard Hot 100, peaking at No. 7, also reaching No. 7 on the Cash Box Top 100, and No. 6 on Record World's "100 Top Pops". The song also made No. 2 on Canada's RPM Top 40-5s and No. 36 on the UK's Record Retailer chart.

Although not characteristic of Pitney's pop sound, as heard in "Town Without Pity" and "(The Man Who Shot) Liberty Valance," AllMusic noted that "It Hurts to Be in Love" "was about as close as any of his major hits came to straight-ahead rock & roll."

In 2007, Razor & Tie Records released the original Sedaka demo as part of the anthology album The Definitive Collection.

=== Chart history ===
==== Weekly charts ====
| Chart (1964) | Peak position |
|---|---|
| Australia | 6 |
| Canada RPM Top Singles | 2 |
| UK | 36 |
| U.S. Billboard Hot 100 | 7 |
| U.S. Cash Box Top 100 | 7 |
| U.S. Record World | 6 |

==== Year-end charts ====
| Chart (1964) | Rank |
|---|---|
| U.S. Billboard Hot 100 | 27 |
| U.S. Cash Box | 65 |

== Durocs version ==
In 1979 a power pop version of the song was recorded by Durocs, a studio group comprising singers, songwriters and multi-instrumentalists Ron Nagle and Scott Mathews. Mathews and Nagle performed almost all the vocal and instrumental parts on the recording themselves, with the exception of the saxophone solo, which was performed by renowned session musician Steve Douglas, a long-time member of The Wrecking Crew. It was the first single released from the self-titled Durocs album, issued the same year on Capitol Records. The song was promoted with a pioneering music video, conceived and directed by Matthews and Nagle, which gained some exposure outside the U.S., including Europe and Australia, and the single reportedly charted in Europe. However it was not successful in America (MTV did not launch until late 1981, so the video gained only limited exposure in the USA) and Capitol dropped the group soon after, partly due to Nagle and Mathews' unwillingness to put together a touring band to promote the album.

== Dan Hartman version ==
"It Hurts to Be in Love"

Single by Dan Hartman

from the album It Hurts to Be in Love
- Released: 1981
- Genre: Pop
- Length: 2:51
- Label: Blue Sky
- Songwriters: Howard Greenfield, Helen Miller
- Producer: Dan Hartman

Dan Hartman singles chronology
| "Heaven in Your Arms" (1981) | "It Hurts to Be in Love" (1981) | "All I Need" (1981) |

In 1981, American singer-songwriter and musician Dan Hartman released a version on his fourth studio album It Hurts to Be in Love. The song was the second single from the album and reached No. 78 on the US Billboard Hot 100. It also charted No. 48 on the Billboard Disco Top 100 chart.

=== Critical reception ===
In a review of It Hurts to Be in Love, John Smyntek of the Detroit Free Press noted: "Hartman doesn't even bother to change the arrangement so he knows a good thing when he hears it." The Morning Call felt Hartman's version "sounds remarkably similar to the original". Dave Marsh of Rolling Stone considered Hartman's rendition "a terrific version". People felt Hartman's take of the "frothy pop tune does little to improve on the original".

=== Track listing ===
7" single (US release)

1. "It Hurts to Be in Love" - 2:44
2. "Pick It Up" - 3:02

7" single (Dutch release)

1. "It Hurts to Be in Love" - 2:44
2. "All I Need" - 4:07

=== Charts ===
| Chart (1981) | Peak position |
|---|---|
| US Billboard Disco Top 100 | 48 |
| US Billboard Hot 100 | 72 |
| US Cash Box Top 100 Singles | 80 |
