= Instant Replay (Dan Hartman album) =

Studio album by Dan Hartman
- Released: June 1, 1978
- Studio: The Schoolhouse (Westport, Connecticut); The Hit Factory (New York City, New York)
- Genre: Disco, pop
- Length: 39:24
- Label: Blue Sky (US); Epic (Worldwide)
- Producer: Dan Hartman

Dan Hartman chronology
Images (1976)	Instant Replay (1978)	Relight My Fire (1979)

Singles from Instant Replay
- 1. "Instant Replay" Released: August 1978

Professional ratings
Review scores
Source	Rating
AllMusic	4/5 stars
Christgau's Record Guide	B

Instant Replay is the third full-length album from singer-songwriter Dan Hartman. Released on June 1, 1978, all the album tracks reached number 1 on the American dance chart. The title track/first single peaked at number 29 on the Hot 100 in the U.S. & number 8 in the United Kingdom. The follow-up single, "This Is It", was only a minor Hot 100 hit, reaching number 91 in 1979, while rising to number 18 in the U.K.

== Track listing ==
- All songs written and arranged by Dan Hartman.
1. "Instant Replay" – 5:19
2. "Countdown/This Is It" – 14:07
3. "Double-O-Love" – 5:56
4. "Chocolate Box" – 2:52
5. "Love Is a Natural" – 6:17
6. "Time & Space" – 4:55

== Charts ==
Chart (1979)	Peak position
Australian (Kent Music Report)	55

== Personnel ==
- Dan Hartman – lead vocals, backing vocals, scat, all other instruments (1), keyboards (2, 3, 5, 6), rhythm guitars (2, 3, 5, 6), bass (2, 3, 5, 6), all instruments (4)
- G.E. Smith – 6-string rhythm guitar (2, 3, 5, 6), tambora (2, 3, 5, 6), first guitar solo (3)
- Vinnie Cusano – 12-string rhythm guitar (3), second guitar solo (3), guitar solo (6), backing vocals (6)
- Hilly Michaels – drums (2, 3, 5, 6), percussion (2, 3, 5, 6)
- Larry Washington – congas (1)
- Edgar Winter – saxophone solo (1, 2)
- Gene Page – string arrangements and conductor
- Salsoul Orchestra – orchestra (uncredited)
- Blanche Napoleon – backing vocals

Production

- Dan Hartman – producer, engineer
- Jon Smith – assistant engineer (sax solos)
- Stan Ross – orchestra recording at Gold Star Studios (Hollywood, California)
- Bruce Gold – orchestra recording assistant
- Arthur Stoppe – mix engineer at Sigma Sound Studios (Philadelphia, Pennsylvania)
- Darrell Rogers – assistant mix engineer
- José Rodriguez – mastering at Sterling Sound (New York, NY)
- Jim Houghton – sleeve photography
- Paula Scher – design
- Seymour Chwast – illustration
- Steve Paul – direction
