= Instant Replay (song) =

Single by Dan Hartman

from the album Instant Replay
- B-side: "Instant Replay (Replayed)"
- Released: August 1978
- Genre: Disco
- Length: 3:25 (single version); 5:20 (album version); 8:15 (12-inch version)
- Label: Blue Sky
- Songwriter: Dan Hartman
- Producer: Dan Hartman

Dan Hartman singles chronology
"Lighthouse" (1977)	"Instant Replay" (1978)	"This Is It" (1979)

"Instant Replay" is a song by Dan Hartman from the album Instant Replay. The song reached number 29 on the Billboard Hot 100 pop singles chart, while topping out on the R&B chart at number 44. In the UK, the song peaked at number 8 in November 1978.

== Music video ==
The video for the song features Hartman alongside future Kiss lead guitarist Vinnie Vincent, Hilly Michaels from the band Sparks on drums, and future Hall & Oates guitarist and Saturday Night Live band leader G. E. Smith on bass. Backing vocalist Blanche Napoleon did not appear in the video, though her vocals can still be heard.

== Charts ==
=== Weekly charts ===
Chart (1978–1979)	Peak position
Australia (Kent Music Report)	6
Canada Top Singles (RPM)	16
Netherlands (Single Top 100)	28
Belgium (Ultratop 50 Flanders)	25
France (IFOP)	27
New Zealand (Recorded Music NZ)	5
UK Singles Chart	8
U.S. Billboard Hot 100	29
U.S. Hot Soul Singles	44
U.S. Cash Box Top 100	22

=== Year-end charts ===
Chart (1978)	Rank
UK	81
Chart (1979)	Rank
Australia (Kent Music Report)	53

== Certifications ==
Region	Certification	Certified units/sales
Canada (Music Canada)	Gold	75,000^{^}
United Kingdom (BPI)	Silver	250,000^{^}
United States (RIAA)	Gold	1,000,000^{^}
^{^} Shipments figures based on certification alone.

== Cover versions ==
- The song was covered in 1990 by the UK pop duo Yell!, reaching number 10 in the UK Singles Chart.
