= Keep the Fire Burnin' (Dan Hartman song) =

Single by Dan Hartman starring Loleatta Holloway

from the album Keep the Fire Burnin'
- Released: 1995
- Genre: Dance; house
- Length: 4:24 (single version); 5:58 (album version)
- Label: Columbia Records
- Songwriter(s): Dan Hartman
- Producer(s): Dan Hartman

Dan Hartman starring Loleatta Holloway singles chronology
"The Love in Your Eyes" (1994)	"Keep the Fire Burnin'" (1995)

"Keep the Fire Burnin'" is a song by American musician-singer-songwriter Dan Hartman featuring Loleatta Holloway, which was released in 1995 as the second and final single from Hartman's posthumous album, Keep The Fire Burnin'. The song reached No. 49 in the UK Singles Chart in April 1995.

== Background ==
"Keep the Fire Burnin'" was one of Hartman's final compositions and his last single release. Before his death from an AIDS-related brain tumor in March 1994, Hartman began recording a new album of contemporary pop and dance music. He revealed in 1993, "So many things have changed in terms of social and political issues, as well as the need for love and personal relationships. All of these things are the reasons why writing and recording new material is most meaningful to me." Hartman died before the album was completed, but two new songs, "Keep the Fire Burnin'" and "The Love in Your Eyes", were subsequently included on the posthumous compilation album Keep The Fire Burnin'.

"Keep the Fire Burnin'" saw Hartman collaborating again with the American singer Loleatta Holloway. The pair had previously worked together on Hartman's 1979 song "Relight My Fire" and Holloway's 1980 song "Love Sensation". Plans were made to shoot a music video for the song, but Hartman died before it could be filmed. The song was released as a single in Europe by Columbia.

== Critical reception ==
In a 1995 review of Keep the Fire Burnin', Greg Morago of the Hartford Courant wrote, "Hartman was preparing to reconquer the '90s dance floor with a pop-dance collection at the time of his death. From that effort, the title song, "Keep the Fire Burnin," is Hartman at his best. Aggressive, bouncy and up-front, the track - with additional smokin' vocals by diva Loleatta Holloway of "Love Sensation" fame - proves he never lost his touch." Anthony Violanti of The Buffalo News stated, "Hartman doesn't waste time kicking out the jams on his new album. "Keep the Fire Burnin'," the opening track, is a scorching, gospel-style duet with Loleatta Holloway."

== Track listing ==
- 12-inch single
1. "Keep the Fire Burnin'" (Tee's Mix) – 6:00
2. "Keep the Fire Burnin'" (Tee's Dub) – 6:00
3. "Keep the Fire Burnin'" (Tee's Freeze Mix) – 5:18
4. "Keep the Fire Burnin'" (Classic Throwback Mix/F. Knuckles) – 6:05
5. "Keep the Fire Burnin'" (12 Inch LP/Todd Terry) – 5:57
6. "Keep the Fire Burnin'" (LP Mix/M. Brauer) – 5:56
- 12-inch single (1995 UK and Netherlands 2x 12" Vinyl promo)
1. "Keep the Fire Burnin'" (Classic Throwback Mix) – 6:05
2. "Keep the Fire Burnin'" (LP Version) – 5:56
3. "Keep the Fire Burnin'" (SFB Feeling) – 6:06
4. "Keep the Fire Burnin'" (SFB Feeling Bonus Beats) – 5:29
5. "Keep the Fire Burnin'" (Tee's Mix) – 6:00
6. "Keep the Fire Burnin'" (Tee's Dub) – 6:00
7. "Keep the Fire Burnin'" (That Roxy Mix) – 8:05
8. "Keep the Fire Burnin'" (Tee's Freeze) – 5:18
- CD single (UK release #1)
1. "Keep the Fire Burnin'" (7inch Mix/M. Brauer) – 4:24
2. "Keep the Fire Burnin'" (Tee's Mix) – 6:00
- CD single (UK release #2)
1. "Keep the Fire Burnin'" (Tee's Mix) – 6:00
2. "Keep the Fire Burnin'" (Tee's Dub) – 6:00
3. "Keep the Fire Burnin'" (Tee's Freeze Mix) – 5:18
4. "Keep the Fire Burnin'" (Classic Throwback Mix) – 6:05
5. "Keep the Fire Burnin'" (12 Inch Mix) – 5:57
6. "Keep the Fire Burnin'" (LP Mix) – 5:56
- CD single (French release)
1. "Keep the Fire Burnin'" (7inch Mix/M. Brauer) – 4:24
2. "Keep the Fire Burnin'" (Classic Throwback Mix/F. Knuckles) – 6:05
3. "Keep the Fire Burnin'" (That SFB Feeling Bonus Beats) – 5:29
4. "Keep the Fire Burnin'" (Tee's Mix) – 5:59

== Personnel ==
Production

- Dan Hartman – producer
- Bill Klatt – engineer on "Tee's Mix," "Tee's Dub," "Tee's Freeze Mix" and "12 Inch Mix"
- Todd Terry – remixer and additional producer on "Tee's Mix," "Tee's Dub," "Tee's Freeze Mix," "12 Inch Mix" and "Classic Throwback Mix"
- Michael H. Brauer – remixer and additional producer on "LP Mix" and "7inch Mix"
- Frankie Knuckles – remixer and additional producer on "Classic Throwback Mix," "SFB Feeling Mix," "That SFB Feeling Bonus Beats," "That Roxy Mix" and "LP Version"
- John Poppo – engineer on "Classic Throwback Mix" and "That SFB Feeling Bonus Beats"
- Eric Kupper, Terry Burrus – keyboard programming on "Classic Throwback Mix" and "That SFB Feeling Bonus Beats"

== Charts ==
Chart (1995)	Peak position
Scotland (OCC)	52
UK Singles (OCC)	49
UK Club Chart (Music Week)	15
