= David Hall (sound archivist) =

American sound archivist and writer (1916–2012)

David Hall (December 16, 1916 – April 10, 2012) was an American sound archivist and writer.

== Background and early career ==
Hall was born in New Rochelle, New York, to Fairfax Hall (1886–1958), a pediatrician, and Eleanor Raeburn Hall née Remy (1895–1962). He attended college-preparatory school at Phillips Exeter Academy, graduating in 1935, and went on to Yale University, earning a B.A. in 1939. Hall also did postgraduate work at Columbia University from 1940 to 1941.

At the urging of family friend, Saturday Review of Literature editor Norman Cousins, Hall abandoned his graduate studies to write an annotated discography of recorded sound. The book instructed record collectors on "how to lay a solid foundation for a record library, what pitfalls to avoid in the buying of records, whether or not it is advisable to specialize, and how to distinguish between fair and excellent recordings of the same composition." The book also provided tips on playback equipment and offered detailed commentary on the whole range of recorded music, from classical through experimental music, jazz, folk, and spoken word. The Record Book appeared in 1940 and was followed by a series of supplements, and international edition (1948). The last supplement appeared in 1950. The series was an immediate hit, selling more than 100,000 copies.

== Career ==
In 1940, Hall began a lifelong involvement with the record business, taking a job as an advertising copywriter with Columbia Records, then located in Bridgeport, Connecticut. In 1942, he became music program annotator for the NBC Symphony Orchestra – the all-star orchestra conducted by Arturo Toscanini. In 1948, Hall joined forces with fellow Yale graduate John Hammond on a quest to post-war Europe on behalf of Mercury Records, then a Chicago-based produced of "pop" material.

Wishing to enter the growing classical music market, Mercury executives realized that radio stations and governments in formerly Nazi-occupied countries held a gold mine in superb performances by Europe's top musicians. Hammond's and Hall's objective was to acquire these assets for Mercury. Hammond had hired Hall, "a well-known authority on classical recording, to handle the considerable job of cataloging Czech and German material. He was known and respected by the Czechs, who were interested in establishing an international records archive. David would be an asset in delicate negotiations." Hall and Hammond left Prague one step ahead of Soviet forces as they crushed Czechoslovakia's democratic government.

Hall remained at Mercury Records until 1956 as classic music director. Under his leadership, Mercury began releasing its notable "Living Presence" series of classical recordings. Hall worked closely with sound engineering pioneer, C. Robert Fine (né Clarence Robert Fine; 1922–1982). Fine's mobile sound studio toured the midwest, recording performances by the Detroit, Louisville, and Minneapolis symphonies and musical groups at the Eastman School at the University of Rochester. A 1955 recording of the Minneapolis Symphony performing Tchaikovsky's 1812 Overture under the baton of Antal Doráti became the best selling classical record of the decade.

In 1956, Hall was awarded a Fulbright Teaching Fellowship, which enabled him to spend a year at the University of Copenhagen (Denmark) teaching advanced recording techniques to Danish engineers and musicians. Hall had long been interested in Scandinavian music, having directed the music center at The American-Scandinavian Foundation in New York from 1950 to 1957.

Upon returning to the United States in the fall of 1957, Hall became music editor of Hi-Fi/Stereo Review (later Stereo Review). Hall contributed reviews of classic music and articles to the magazine until it folded in 1998. In his writings, Hall championed contemporary music. His 1964 article on Charles Ives included the first full discography of Ives's recordings.

In 1963, Hall became president of Composers' Recordings, Inc., a nonprofit record label devoted to recording and distributing the work of contemporary composers. Among the notable recordings produced under his leadership were a series of performances by avant-garde composer Harry Partch.

In 1967, Hall was the founding curator of the Rodgers and Hammerstein Archives of Recorded Sound, one of the units of the New York Public Library for the Performing Arts at Lincoln Center. There he pioneered new techniques of cataloging recorded material as one of the initiatives of the Research Libraries Group, a consortium of the nation's leading research libraries. Hall and his associates also released an important collection of historic sound recordings, The Mapleson Cylinders, which captured the singing of Metropolitan Opera stars of the early twentieth century. This recording won a Grammy Award for Best Historical Album in 1986.

During this period, Hall helped to found the Association for Recorded Sound Collections (ARSC) in 1966. He served as the group's president from 1980 through 1982. In 2002, he received the ARSC Award for Distinguished Service to Historical Recordings.

In 1986, Hall retired to the seaside village of Castine, Maine, where he continued to write record reviews and consult on recording projects. Through the 1990s, he chaired the classical records awards committee for the National Academy of Recording Arts & Sciences. Late in life, Hall was at work on a biography of the twentieth century American composer, Roy Harris. He died in 2012 in Castine.

In addition to introducing American audiences to the remarkable riches of recorded music in the years following the second World War, Hall played an especially important role as a champion of contemporary music. At least half the composers listed in the 1940 Record Book were still living. They included such notables as Aaron Copland, Roy Harris, Charles Ives, Harry Partch, William Schuman, and others. His writings also helped garner attention for jazz and folk musicians.

== Family ==
On July 8, 1940, he married Bernice Dobkin (1915–1992). They had four children, Marion Hall Hunt, Jonathan Hall, Peter Dobkin Hall (1946–2015), and Susannah Hall.

== Bibliography ==
=== References ===
Books
- Hall, David (1940). The Record Book, A Music Lover's Guide to the World of the Phonograph. New York: Smith & Durrell. LCCN 41-1274; OCLC 404089 (all editions).
1. [1st] Supplement. New York: Smith & Durrell. 1941 [1940] – via Internet Archive (Boston Library Consortium, Wellesley College).
2. The Record Book, A Music Lover's Guide to the World of the Phonograph. With Supplement (Special ed.). New York: Smith & Durrell. 1942 [1940]. LCCN 50-46760.
3. 2nd Supplement. New York: Smith & Durrell. 1943 [1940, 1941] – via Internet Archive (Public.Resource.Org, Digital Library of India).
4. The Record Book, A Music Lover's Guide to the World of the Phonograph. Includes 1st Supplement (©1941) and 2nd Supplement (©1943) (Complete ed.). New York: Citadel Press. 1946 [1940]. LCCN 46-11855.
- Hall, David (1948). The Record Book, a Guide to the World of the Phonograph (International ed.). New York: Oliver Durrell, Inc. – via Internet Archive. LCCN 48-5666.
1. Via HathiTrust. (University of Michigan Library). O. Durrell. 1948.
2. Via Internet Archive. New York Durrell. 1948 – via Internet Archive.
3. Re-Print. Westport, Connecticut: Greenwood Press. 1978 [1948]. LCCN 78-5686.
- Hall, David. "So ... You Want to Build a Record Library?". Philadelphia: H. Royer Smith. LCCN 2012-560138; OCLC 30005584 (all editions).
1. 64 Page Booklet. 1941.
2. Columbia Record Catalog, 1942. Bridgeport, Columbia Records. 1942. pp. 425–436 – via Internet Archive (Media History Digital Library).
3. Columbia Record Catalog, 1943. 1942. pp. xiii–xxx – via Internet Archive (shellackophile).
4. Columbia Record Catalog, 1944. Bridgeport, Columbia Records. 1944. pp. xvii–xxiv – via Internet Archive (Media History Digital Library).
5. The Record Book. Chapter 1 (International ed.). New York Durrell. 1948. pp. 3–7 – via Internet Archive.
- Hall, David. Records: 1950 Edition (1st ed.). New York: Alfred A. Knopf. LCCN 50-9155.
- Hall, David (1950). Enjoyment of Music – A Study Guide. In cooperation with the National Broadcasting Company, Radio Station WNBC, University of the Air, and NBC Symphony. Brooklyn College. LCCN unk84064742.
- Hall, David; Levin, Abner Fisher (1910–2000) (1955). The Disc Book. New York: Long Player Publications – via HathiTrust. LCCN 55-4152.
  Abner Levin had been general manager for Sam Goody in New York City, once deemed the largest record store in the world (New York Times; May 20, 2000).
- Hammond, John Henry (1910–1987) (1981) [1977]. John Hammond on Record: An Autobiography. New York: Penguin. pp. 282–183. ISBN 9780140057058 – via Internet Archive (Kahle/Austin Foundation). LCCN 80-23519; ISBN 0-1400-5705-6.
- Phillips Exeter Academy (The) – Alumni Directory. 1959. p. 96 – via Internet Archive (Allen County Public Library).
Magazines, journals, news media, and blogs
- Classical Music Guide Forums (The) (April 17, 2000). "David Hall RIP".
- Hall, David. ARSC Journal. (link) ISSN 2151-4402, ISSN 2151-4402.
1. "The Mapleson Cylinder Project: A Preliminary Report" (PDF). 3 (3): 4–13. 1981.
2. "A Provisional Mapleson Cylinder Chronology" (PDF). 3 (3): 14–20. 1981.
3. "A Mapleson Afterword: Further Notes on the Mapleson Cylinder Project at the Rodgers and Hammerstein Archives of Recorded Sound, New York Public Library" (PDF). 14 (1): 5–10. 1982.
- Hall, David. Recorded Sound (Recorded Sound ran for 86 issues, from May 1961 to July 1984). Column: "The Mapleson Cylinder Project". Journal of the British Institute of Recorded Sound. ISSN 0034-1630.
1. "The Mapleson Cylinder Project". (82): 39–59. July 1982.
2. "Repertoire, Performers, and Recording Dates". (83): 21–55. January 1983.
3. "A Mapleson Notebook". (86): 5–28. July 1984.
- Hall, David. Ovation. The Magazine for Classical Music Listeners. 320 West 57th Street, New York, New York. ISSN 0196-433X.
1. "The Mapleson Cylinder Recordings: Live at the Met, 1901–1903". 5 (9): 26–33. October 1984.
2. "The Mapleson Cylinder Recordings: Live at the Met, 1901–1903 — And the Project to Transfer Them to Discs". 5 (10): 19–21. November 1984.
- Hall, David. "Charles Ives: A Discography" [In three parts].
  Hall was Editor of HiFi/Stereo Review from 1956 to 1962, and thereafter, a contributor.
1. Part 1. 13 (4): 142–145. October 1964.
2. Part 2. 13 (5): 102–106. November 1964.
3. Part 3. 13 (6): 92–96. December 1964.
- New York Times (The); Copage, Eric V. (May 20, 2000). "Abner Levin, 88; Ran Store at Dawn of LP Era".
1. Permalink. Vol. 149 (Late ed.). May 20, 2000. p. 11 (Section B) (digital image 26) – via TimesMachine. ProQuest 431438921.
2. Copage, Eric V. (May 20, 2000). New York Times Blog. ProQuest 2233506609.
