= Irving Green =

American record industry executive (1916–2006)

Irving B. Green
- Born: February 6, 1916; Brooklyn, New York, United States
- Died: July 1, 2006 (age 90)
- Occupation: Record producer
- Known for: founder of Mercury Records
- Spouse: Pamela Green
- Children: 2
- Parent: Al Green

Irving B. Green (also known as Irvin B. Green) (February 6, 1916 – July 1, 2006) was an American record industry executive, and founder and president of Mercury Records.

== Biography ==
Green was born in Brooklyn, New York, the son of Sylvia (née Langler) and Albert "Al" Green, the founder of National Records. His father was Jewish. He was instrumental in promoting African-American artists such as Sarah Vaughan, Dinah Washington and the Platters.

In 1945, he founded Mercury Records, in Chicago, Illinois, along with Berle Adams and Arthur Talmadge, and helped turn the independent outfit into a major label.

In 1962, Green sold Mercury to Consolidated Electronics Industries Corporation (Conelco) an American affiliate of Dutch electronics giant Philips of the Netherlands but he remained Mercury Records' President. Green continued to run Mercury for five years after selling the company.

In 1964, Mercury Records became the first major record label to have a black high-level executive, when Green hired the trumpeter Quincy Jones as vice president.

After leaving Mercury, he became a successful real estate developer in Palm Springs and built over 18,000 homes in southern Iran with real-estate developer Bill Levitt.

== Personal life ==
Green died on July 1, 2006, at the Desert Regional Medical Center in Palm Springs, California. He was survived by his wife Pamela and two daughters, Roberta Green Hunt and Kelli Green Ross. Services were held at Temple Isaiah in Palm Springs. He is buried in Desert Memorial Park in Cathedral City, California.
