= Arthur Talmadge =

Founder of Mercury Records

Arthur Talmadge (1913 – May 25, 2006) was the American co-founder of Mercury Records. Born in Chicago, Illinois, Talmadge was a former President of United Artists Records, Executive Vice President at Mercury Records, and former President and founder of Musicor Records. He also served in the US Army during World War II. He founded Mercury Records together with Irving Green and Berle Adams in 1944. Early artists signed by the label included Erroll Garner, Dinah Washington, Tony Martin, Frankie Laine, The Platters and Vic Damone.
