= You Won't Believe Your Ears =

Studio album by Wes Harrison
- Released: 1963
- Genre: Comedy
- Label: Philips Records

You Won't Believe Your Ears is a 1963 comedy album released by American comedian and sound effects artist, Wes Harrison. Originally released on Philips LP record 103, it originally charted in November 1963, staying on the chart for 5 weeks and peaking at position number 83. The album was re-released on compact disc on July 1, 1991.

== Track listing ==
1. "Out At The Outhouse"
2. "Father Oh Father"
3. "Better Late Than Never"
4. "Wes' Car"
5. "Saga Of The Duck Hunt: By Horse"
6. "Saga Of The Duck Hunt: By Jet Plane"
7. "Saga Of The Duck Hunt: By Train"
8. "Saga Of The Duck Hunt: By Car"
9. "Saga Of The Duck Hunt: By Boat"
