= Philips Records =

Dutch record label

- Historical logo
- Parent company: Universal Music Group; Previously; Philips (1950–1962); PolyGram (1962–1999)
- Founded: 1950; 76 years ago (as Philips Phonographische Industrie)
- Founder: Philips
- Status: Dormant
- Distributors: Decca Music Group; Verve Label Group; Island Records; Universal Music Group
- Genre: Various
- Country of origin: Netherlands
- Location: Amsterdam, Netherlands
- Official website: deccaclassics.com

Philips Records was a Dutch record label founded by the electronics company Philips and in 1999 was absorbed into the Dutch-American music corporation Universal Music Group. It was founded as Philips Phonographische Industrie in 1950. In 1946, Philips acquired the company which pressed records for British Decca's Dutch outlet in Amsterdam.

== History ==
The record label originated as "Philips Phonographische Industrie" (PPI) in June 1950 when it began issuing classical music recordings. Recordings were also made of popular artists of multiple nationalities and of classical artists from Germany, France and the Netherlands. Launched under the slogan "Records of the Century" (referring to Philips Industries' UK Head Office at Century House, W1), the first releases in Britain appeared in January 1953 on 10" 78 rpm discs, with LPs appearing in July 1954.

Philips also distributed recordings made by the United States Columbia Records (which at the time was a unit of CBS) in the UK and on the European continent. After the separation of the English Columbia label (owned by EMI) and American Columbia, Philips also started distributing original Columbia recordings on the Philips label in the UK.

The first batch of eight singles releases in 1953 included British artists such as Gilbert Harding, Flanagan and Allen and Gracie Fields, followed by American Columbia recording artists Jo Stafford, Frankie Laine and Johnnie Ray. The first single on the label to chart was Frankie Laine's "I Believe", which reached the No. 1 chart position in the UK that April. Many of the first British recordings on the label were produced by Norman Newell until John Franz was appointed artists and repertoire (A&R) manager in 1954.

In 1958, Philips created a subsidiary label, Fontana Records, which meant that American-Columbia recordings were being issued on both the Philips and Fontana labels. This arrangement lasted until April 1962, when, under pressure from Columbia in America, Philips then created a third label for them, CBS Records (it could not name the label Columbia as the copyright for that name had long been owned by EMI). In late 1964, under the stewardship of U.S. President of Columbia Records Goddard Lieberson, CBS Records formed its own international operations, adopting the name of its then parent CBS. CBS Records set up their UK operation in Theobalds Road in Holborn. Singles and albums on the Philips and Fontana labels by Columbia-owned product were subsequently deleted from the catalogue.

In 1962, Philips Records and Deutsche Grammophon formed the Grammophon-Philips Group joint venture (GPG), which later became PolyGram in 1972. UK pressings were manufactured at the company's large factory based at Walthamstow in N.E. London.

In 1961, after Philips lost its US and Canadian distribution deal with Columbia Records, it entered an exchange agreement with Mercury Records. A year later, Philips' US affiliate Consolidated Electronics Industries Corp. (a.k.a. Conelco), bought Mercury and its subsidiary labels, such as Smash. Philips classical, jazz and pop records were now marketed by Mercury in the US under the Philips label. The Mercury Living Presence team also made classical recordings for Philips, in July 1961. These records, made in Walthamstow Town Hall near London, included Liszt piano concertos by Sviatoslav Richter and the London Symphony Orchestra conducted by Kiril Kondrashin; two albums of symphonic "bon-bons" by the London Symphony Orchestra and Charles Mackerras released as "Kaleidoscope"; "Russian Song Recital" by Galina Vishnevskaya and Mstislav Rostropovich; and Beethoven sonata op. 69 for cello and piano by Richter and Rostropovich. The Richter Liszt album was recorded on 3-track 35mm magnetic film and was reissued on CD from a remaster made from the film by original producer Wilma Cozart Fine, (wife of the recording engineer Bob) as part of the Philips Solo series.

Classical groups that Philips heavily recorded included the Royal Concertgebouw Orchestra, the Beaux Arts Trio, and the Quartetto Italiano. Violinist Arthur Grumiaux and the pianists Claudio Arrau, Stephen Kovacevich, Mitsuko Uchida and Alfred Brendel were under contract to Philips. Symphony orchestras under contract, including the LSO, were under the command of prestigious young conductors such as Colin Davis and Bernard Haitink.

From 1961 until the late 1980s, Philips Records (USA) issued many classical titles in US-specific packaging, initially in the same glossy-laminated covers as Mercury Records. The records were pressed at Mercury's plant in Richmond, Indiana, and mastered in New York by George Piros at Fine Recording, using 2-track and mono master tapes provided by Philips. These releases were the PHS 900 xxx series for stereo and the 500 xxx series for mono. Clair Van Ausdal in Mercury's New York office oversaw the Philips classical US releases through the mid-1960s.

Philips also launched an eponymous jazz label in the US, releasing both imported European Philips recordings and making new American recordings of Gerry Mulligan, Dizzy Gillespie and Woody Herman, among others. These records were made through Mercury's existing jazz operations and produced by Jack Tracy and others.

In addition to jazz and classical music, Philips also became a major label in the world of rock and pop music in the late 1950s until late 1970s. In the UK, Philips developed a strong popular music roster, signing acts like Marty Wilde, Roy Castle, Anne Shelton, the Four Pennies, the Springfields, Dusty Springfield, and the Walker Brothers. The American pop label was launched in 1962 starting with the R&B single "Gee Baby" by Ben & Bea as well as folk-country, like "Makes You Wanna Sigh" by Ross Legacy in 1969. It signed the Four Seasons in 1964. It also played a part in promoting the garage rock genre and the psychedelic rock genre in the mid to late 1960s, their most successful signing being Blue Cheer.

In the UK during the 1960s and 1970s, Philips turned its attention more to the growing middle-of-the-road market with artists like Lena Zavaroni, Peters and Lee, Nana Mouskouri and Demis Roussos, as well as issuing novelty records by media personalities like Ed Stewart, Bruce Forsyth, Dave Allen and Chris Hill. In 1970, Philips, Fontana, Mercury Records, and the newly formed Vertigo Records were amalgamated into a new company called Phonogram. In Europe, however, Philips was used on a major basis and it became the outlet for Sire Records in America and distributed a number of punk and new wave bands like Talking Heads, the Ramones, and Radio Birdman, who were signed from Australia. It also released some disco records by Donna Summer and the Village People, as their home label Casablanca Records was not cleared for use in all countries around the world. Another important American label signing for the UK was Avco Records, which provided Phonogram with one of their best-selling U.S. acts, the Stylistics. By late 1979 Phonogram signed Dire Straits to the Vertigo label. The band sold huge numbers of records all over Europe and were chosen to promote the initial release of CDs in 1985, with a nationwide road tour in association with Philips/Sony Industries.

By 1980, PolyGram consolidated all of its U.S. operations, Phonogram, Inc. Mercury Records, RSO, Casablanca and Polydor Records and associated labels into PolyGram Records and it was based in New York City. Under the new company, PolyGram decided to discontinue Philips as a pop and rock label in the UK and throughout much of Europe, though it still frequently issued records in France and South East Asia by Chinese and Hong Kong pop artists. The majority of PolyGram's rock and pop music signings went to Mercury, and Polydor in the UK and Europe, though the label was used sparingly in America. Philips became part of PolyGram Classics as a classical music label along with Decca Records and Deutsche Grammophon. Most artists were moved to Mercury Records or other local PolyGram-owned labels.

From the early 1970s, Philips classical records were no longer being produced in the US; rather they were made in the Netherlands and sold as imports in the American market. Philips reissued a group of Mercury Living Presence titles as "Mercury Golden Imports", with manufacture in the Netherlands and masters cut from 2-track production tapes, as opposed to the original-issue method of mixing stereo LPs directly from the edited 3-track master tapes and films.

In the 1980s, Philips Classics Records was formed to distribute its classical artists, although classical recordings have also been issued on the regular Philips label. In the US, Philips eventually handled distribution and sales for Philips, Mercury, British Decca (sold under the London label in the US) and Deutsche Grammophon.

After the sale of PolyGram to Vivendi/Seagram, all PolyGram-labels – including Philips and Decca – became part of the Universal Music Group.

== Compact disc era ==
In 1983, Philips became one of the first record labels to issue compact discs using digital recordings that had been made since 1978.

Philips and its subsidiaries eventually re-issued many of its pre-digital stereo and mono recordings on compact disc. Philips and DuPont partnered in four CD manufacturing plants in Hanover, Germany; Blackburn in the UK (formerly the Philips Laservision Disc factory); Kings Mountain in North Carolina, and Louviers in France. By the mid-1990s, PolyGram Classics handled the classical labels (Philips, Mercury, Decca, Deutsche Grammophon) and Verve Music Group handled the jazz back catalogue (from Verve, Mercury, etc.) and new jazz releases. Island Records absorbed Mercury in 2014 and in doing so, Island has continued to manage the Philips pop back catalogue to this day.

Philips Records has been part of Universal Music since 1998, the name continuing to be licensed from the label's former parent company. In 1999, Philips Classics was absorbed into the Decca Music Group, and Philips recording and mastering operations in the Netherlands were shut down. Former employees bought the Philips Recording Center in Baarn, Netherlands, and formed Polyhymnia International (a recording and mastering company) and Pentatone Records (which specializes in SACD releases).

Many of the Philips classical recordings have been reissued on the Eloquence label. Universal also released a "Philips 50" series marking the 50th anniversary of Philips Records in the early 2000s; some of those CDs are still in print. Pentatone has released Philips Quadraphonic sound recordings from the early and mid-1970s in 4-channel SACD format, as their RQR Series.

Philips' classical catalog was issued on CD under the headings Digital Classics, Legendary Classics and Silver Line Classics. Many of these titles have been reissued on the Decca label.

== Releases ==
=== Connoisseur Collection ===
The "Philips Connoisseur Collection" issued world music and other genres.

- PCC–603: Soeur Sourire – The Singing Nun
- PCC–606: Missa Luba (a version of the Latin Mass based on traditional Congolese songs)
- PCC–611: Les Soeurs Blanches Of Katana – Missa Bantu
- PCC–616: Michel Legrand – The Umbrellas of Cherbourg (Les Parapluies De Cherbourg)
- PCC–619: Los Fronterizos Chorus and Orchestra – Misa Criolla
- PCC–608: Edith Piaf – Adieu, Little Sparrow
- PCC–620: Jacques Brel: The Poetic World of Jacques Brel
- PCC–621: Sarah Gorby – Songs of the Ghetto
- PCC–623: Various – Misa Flamenca · Misa Mozarabe
- PCC–633: Yves Montand – Extraordinaire!
- PCC–634: Jacques Brel – If you go away

=== Popular music artists ===
- David Bowie – David Bowie (Space Oddity) (1969)
- Lucifer's Friend – Germany/UK (1970)
- Alan Stivell – Renaissance de la Harpe Celtique (1972)
- John R. Cash – U.S.
- Nike Ardilla – South East Asia (1990–1993)
- Kamahl – Australia
- Galapagos Duck – Australia
- Radio Birdman – Australia – European release only
- Hush – Australia (debut single release only)
- Silver Studs – Australia
- Demis Roussos – Greece
- Nana Mouskouri – Greece
- Guys 'n' Dolls – England
- The Missing Links – Australia
- Elton John (US singles from 1968 to 1970)
- Mud – England (1969, but also on Philips in Europe from 1975 to 1977)
- Thunderthighs – England
- 5,000 Volts – England
- Lena Zavaroni – Scotland
- Madeline Bell – Newark, New Jersey
- Jorge Ben - Brazil
- Maria Bethânia – Brazil
- Blue Cheer – San Francisco, California, U.S.
- Blue Mink – England
- Teresa Brewer – Toledo, Ohio, U.S.
- Chico Buarque – Brazil
- Cluster – Berlin, Germany
- Ray Conniff (licensed from U.S. by Columbia Records)
- Gal Costa – Brazil
- Teresa De Sio – Cava de' Tirreni, Italy
- Val Doonican – Ireland
- Ekseption – Netherlands
- Eloy (debut album only)
- The Four Pennies – various, England
- The Four Seasons – Newark, New Jersey, U.S.
- Frumpy – Hamburg, Germany
- Gong – France
- Jacques Brel – Belgium
- Johnny Hallyday – Paris, France (from 1961 to 2005)
- Coco Briaval – Paris, France (1966)
- Wes Harrison –
- H.P. Lovecraft – Chicago, U.S.
- Bobby Hebb – Nashville, Tennessee, U.S.
- Johnny Horton – (licensed from U.S. by Columbia Records)
- Brian Hyland – Queens, New York, U.S.
- Jim and Jean – New York City, U.S. (1965)
- Billy Joel – New York, U.S
- The Kaye Sisters – England
- Kraftwerk – Düsseldorf, Germany
- Frankie Laine (licensed from U.S. by Columbia Records)
- Vicky Leandros – Greece/Germany
- Los Paraguayos – Paraguay
- Luv' – Netherlands
- Harvey Mandel – Detroit, Michigan, U.S.
- Manfred Mann's Earth Band – European release only
- Susan Maughan – Consett, County Durham
- Paul Mauriat – Marseille, France
- Roger Miller – Nashville, Tennessee, U.S.
- Guy Mitchell (licensed from U.S. by Columbia Records)
- Mouth & MacNeal – Netherlands
- Osamu Minagawa – Japan
- New Vaudeville Band – England
- Peters and Lee – England
- Ajda Pekkan – Turkey
- Johnnie Ray (licensed from U.S. by Columbia Records)
- Richard and the Young Lions – Newark, New Jersey, U.S.
- Raul Seixas – Brazil
- Serendipity Singers – Boulder, Colorado, U.S.
- Nina Simone – Tryon, North Carolina, U.S.
- The Singing Nun – Fichermont, Belgium
- Sir Douglas Quintet – San Antonio, Texas, U.S.
- Dusty Springfield – West Hampstead, London
- The Springfields – London
- The Swingle Singers – Paris, France
- Wally Tax – Amsterdam, Netherlands
- The Tempters – Japan
- T.O.P - Norway
- Luigi Tenco – 21 March 1938, Cassine, Alessandria – 27 January 1967, Sanremo, Imperia, Italy
- Frankie Vaughan – Liverpool, England
- Caetano Veloso – Brazil
- The Walker Brothers – Los Angeles, California, U.S.; based in London from Feb. 1965
- John Walker – New York, U.S.
- Scott Walker – Hamilton, Ohio, U.S.
- David Whitfield – England
- Marty Wilde – Greenwich, South London
- Paco de Lucía – Algeciras, Spain
- UG14 – Malaysia (1991)
