= Al Green (music producer) =

American record producer

Albert B. Green
- Born: Chicago, Illinois, United States
- Occupation: Record producer
- Known for: Founder of National Records
- Spouse: Sylvia Langler
- Children: Irving Green

Albert Green (also known as A. B. Green) was an American record industry executive, and founder and president of National Records.

== Biography ==
Green was born in Chicago where he worked as a union organizer for the Painters Union. He moved to Phillipsburg, New Jersey where he owned a plastic pressing plant. During World War II, his factory switched from producing toilet seat covers to producing plastic records - which had previously been made from shellac. Seeing that the real money was in producing records and not knowing anything about the business, he hired Sylvia Langler (later his wife), who had experience in the industry. In 1944, he founded National Records and hired Herb Abramson, a friend of his wife, as his A&R man. As the business grew, he brought in more A&R men including Lee Magid, Bob Shad, and Jesse Stone.

== Personal life ==
He married his secretary, Sylvia Langler. His son is Irving Green. He was of Jewish descent.
