= Mercury Records =

American record label

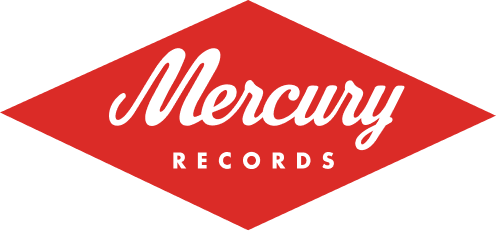
- Parent company: Universal Music Group; Previously; Philips (1961–1972); PolyGram (1972–1998)
- Founded: 1945; 81 years ago
- Founder: Irving Green; Berle Adams; Arthur Talmadge; Ray Greenberg
- Distributors: Republic (United States); EMI (United Kingdom, Japan); Island Def Jam/Barclay (France); Island (pre-2014 catalog)
- Genre: Various
- Country of origin: United States
- Location: Chicago, Illinois, (1945–1980); New York, New York (1980–present)
- Official website: mercuryrecords.com; mercurykx.com

Mercury Records is an American record label owned by Universal Music Group. It had significant success as an independent operation in the 1940s and 1950s. Smash Records and Fontana Records were sub labels of Mercury. Mercury Records released rock, funk, R&B, doo wop, soul, blues, pop, rock and roll, and jazz records. In the United States, it is operated through Republic Records; in the United Kingdom and Japan (as Mercury Tokyo in the latter country), it is distributed by EMI Records.

== Background ==
Mercury Records was started in Chicago in 1945 and over several decades saw great success. The success of Mercury has been attributed to the use of alternative marketing techniques to promote records. The conventional method of record promotion used by major labels such as RCA Victor, Decca Records, and Capitol Records was dependent on radio airplay, but Mercury Records co-founder Irving Green decided to promote new records using jukeboxes instead. By lowering promotion costs, Mercury was able to compete with the more established record labels, and thus became an established record label itself.

=== Beginnings ===
Mercury Record Corporation was formed in Chicago in 1945 by Irving Green, Berle Adams, Ray Greenberg, and Arthur Talmadge. The company was a major force in R&B, doo wop, soul, pop doo wop, pop soul, blues, pop, rock and roll, jazz and classical music. Early in the label's history, Mercury opened two pressing plants, one in Chicago and the other in St. Louis, Missouri. By hiring two promoters, Tiny Hill and Jimmy Hilliard, they penetrated the pop market with names such as Frankie Laine, Vic Damone, Tony Fontane, and Patti Page.

In 1946, Mercury hired Eddie Gaedel, an American with dwarfism, most notable for participating in a Major League Baseball game, to portray the "Mercury Man", complete with a winged hat similar to its logo, to promote Mercury recordings. Some early Mercury recordings featured a caricature of him as their logo.

In 1947, Jack Rael, a musician and publicist/manager, persuaded Mercury to let Patti Page (whom he managed) record a song that had been planned to be done by Vic Damone, "Confess". The budget was too small for them to hire a second singer to provide the "answer" parts to Page, so at Rael's suggestion, she did both voices. Though "overdubbing" had been used occasionally on 78 rpm discs in the 1930s, for Lawrence Tibbett recordings, among others, this became the first documented example of "overdubbing" using tape.

The company released an enormous number of recordings under the Mercury label, as well as its subsidiaries (Blue Rock Records, Cumberland Records, EmArcy Records, Smash Records, and Wing Records, later via Fontana Records and Limelight Records after being absorbed by Philips). In addition, they leased and purchased material by independent labels and redistributed them. Under their own label, Mercury released a variety of recording styles from classical music to psychedelic rock. Its subsidiaries, though, focused on their own specialized categories of music.

=== Mercury's jazz division ===
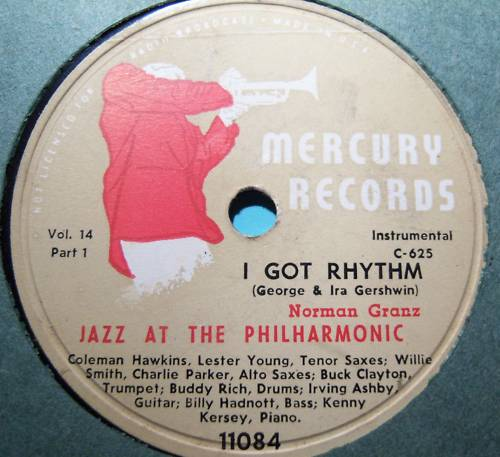
Norman Granz "Jazz at the Philharmonic" 78rpm release

From 1947 to 1952, John Hammond was a vice-president of Mercury Records. Mercury, under its EmArcy label, released LPs by many post-swing and bebop artists, including Clifford Brown and Max Roach, Kenny Drew, Dinah Washington, Nat Adderley, Cannonball Adderley, Ernestine Anderson, Sarah Vaughan, Maynard Ferguson, Walter Benton, Herb Geller.

In the late 1950s, Mercury released jazz recordings of multiple artists, including Max Roach, Coleman Hawkins, Lester Young, Dizzy Gillespie, and Buddy Rich. During the 1960s albums were released by artists including Gene Ammons, Quincy Jones, Buddy Rich, Cannonball Adderley, Dinah Washington, Max Roach, Paul Bley and Jimmy Smith.

=== Later history: 1950s–present ===
From its inception until the mid-1990s, the winged head of Mercury was the label's trademark. As of 2018, Mercury UK, Mercury Classics, and Mercury Tokyo (Japan) use the logo.

During the 1950s, Mercury released hits of musicians such as the Platters, Brook Benton, the Diamonds, and Patti Page. In 1961, Philips, a Dutch electronics company and owner of Philips Records, which had lost its distribution deal with Columbia Records outside North America, played a key role in Mercury's future by signing an exchange agreement with the American record company. Mercury began releasing Philips label recordings in the U.S. in February 1962. Also in 1962, Mercury was sold to Consolidated Electronics Industries Corp. (Conelco), which was an affiliate of Philips under its U.S. Trust division; in 1963, Mercury switched British distribution from EMI to Philips. In 1962, Mercury began marketing a line of phonographs made by Philips bearing the Mercury brand name.

In July 1967, Mercury Records became the first U.S. record label to release cassette music tapes (Musicassettes). In 1969, Mercury changed its corporate name to Mercury Record Productions Inc., while its parent Conelco became North American Philips Corp. (NAPC) after Philips bought control of the company.

Philips and German electronics giant Siemens reorganized their joint-ventured record operations, Grammophon-Philips Group, home of Deutsche Grammophon, Philips Records, and Polydor to become PolyGram in 1972. That year, PolyGram bought Mercury from NAPC. Mercury's corporate name was changed to Phonogram Inc. to match a related company in the UK that operated the Mercury label there. During the 1970s, Mercury released hits by musicians such as Paper Lace, Rod Stewart, Bachman-Turner Overdrive, William Bell, Thin Lizzy, 10cc, Rush, Jerry Butler, and Melba Moore.

From late 1974 to early 1983, the company's label design featured a painting of three famous buildings that are located in Chicago: Marina City, John Hancock Center, and One IBM Plaza, the latter which was Mercury's headquarters during that period, having moved from its long-time address at 35 East Wacker Drive. Mercury released soul musicians such as the Dells and Marvin Sease. From the 1970s through the early 1980s, Mercury released albums of funk musicians such as Ohio Players, the Bar-Kays, Con Funk Shun, Cameo, Kool&the Gang, and Hamilton Bohannon. Mercury released albums by Kool & the Gang (following the dissolution of De-Lite Records in 1985), the first three albums of the 1979-86 self titled series of the Gap Band (via Total Experience Productions) and Cameo (via distribution of leader Larry Blackmon's label Atlanta Artists Records). And the label released early rapper Kurtis Blow's hit "The Breaks" (1980) also. Mercury released blues musician Robert Cray.

In 1980, Phonogram moved its headquarters from Chicago to New York City. In 1981, Mercury, along with other U.S. PolyGram-owned labels, which included Polydor, RSO Records, and Casablanca, consolidated under the new name PolyGram Records, Inc. (now UMG Recordings). Under PolyGram, Mercury absorbed the artists and catalogue of Casablanca Records (also home to the 20th Century Records back catalogue), which consisted of hard rockers Kiss and disco stars Donna Summer and the Village People, and primarily became a rock/pop/new wave label with Van Morrison, Thin Lizzy, All About Eve, Julian Cope, Scorpions, Rush, John Cougar Mellencamp, Big Country, Tears for Fears, Bon Jovi, Animotion, Cinderella, and Def Leppard as well as the Oklahoma-based three-piece Hanson. Mercury, by having Thin Lizzy, Bon Jovi, Cinderella, Def Leppard, Kiss, the Scorpions, and various other rock acts on their roster, became a premiere label for hard rock music. Most of these bands were on Vertigo Records in Europe (that label specialized in progressive rock and hard rock including subgenres like glam metal).

During the 1990s, Mercury released Funk Essentials series such as the Bar-Kays, Con Funk Shun, Leon Haywood, Yarbrough & Peeples, Rene & Angela, Stephanie Mills, and Junior. In late 1998, PolyGram was bought by Seagram, which then absorbed the company into its Universal Music Group unit. Under the reorganization, Mercury Records was closed and folded into the newly formed The Island Def Jam Music Group (IDJMG). Mercury's pop roster was predominantly taken over by Island Records, while its hip-hop acts found a new home at Def Jam Recordings, and some of Mercury's R&B acts were moved to the newly created Def Soul Records. Mercury's former country unit became Mercury Nashville Records. However, Mercury Records was relaunched in 2007 as a label under The Island Def Jam Music Group, appointing record executive David Massey as the president and CEO of the new venture. The label was defunct in 2015. On April 11, 2022, Republic Records announced that they had acquired Mercury Records, and it will continue as their imprint.

The Mercury name also survives on the Mercury Records division of UMG France, the Mercury Studios film division (which absorbed Eagle Rock Entertainment, acquired by UMG in 2014), the classical music label Mercury KX, and catalogue reissues in the United States, United Kingdom, France, Japan, and Brazil, as well. In 2024, Mercury Studios announced a global licensing deal with pay-per-view concert streaming service On Air. In 2024, Mercury Records became part of Universal Music Group-owned Republic Corps, joining sister labels Republic Records, Island Records, Casablanca Records and Def Jam Recordings.

== Mercury Living Presence series ==
In 1951, under the direction of recording engineer C. Robert (Bob) Fine and recording director David Hall (1916–2012), Mercury Records initiated a recording technique using a single microphone to record symphony orchestras. From 1951 to 1956, David Hall recorded Mercury's Living Presence Series LPs. Robert Fine had for several years used a single microphone for Mercury small-ensemble classical recordings produced by John Hammond and later Mitch Miller (indeed, Miller, using his full name of Mitchell Miller, made several recordings as a featured oboe player in the late 1940s for Mercury). The first record in this new Mercury Olympian Series was Pictures at an Exhibition performed by Rafael Kubelík and the Chicago Symphony. The group that became the best known using this technique was the Minneapolis Symphony Orchestra, which, under the leadership of conductor Antal Doráti (and then his successor Stanisław Skrowaczewski), made a series of classical albums that were well reviewed and sold briskly, including the first-ever complete recordings of Tchaikovsky's ballets Swan Lake, The Sleeping Beauty, and The Nutcracker. Dorati's 1954 one-microphone monaural recording (Mercury MG 50054) and 1958 three-microphone stereo rerecording (Mercury MG 50054) of Tchaikovsky's 1812 Overture included dramatic overdub recordings of 1812-era artillery and the bells of the Yale University Carillon. A stereo release in 1960 featured new recordings of the cannon shots, and the bells of the Laura Spelman Rockefeller Memorial Carillon at the Riverside Church in Chicago. Besides Mercury's mono and stereo versions of the 1812, only one other classical album rang up gold-record sales in the 1950s in the U.S.

The New York Times music critic Howard Taubman described the Mercury sound on Pictures at an Exhibition as "being in the living presence of the orchestra" and Mercury eventually began releasing their classical recordings under the 'Living Presence' series' name. The recordings were produced by Mercury vice president Wilma Cozart, who later married Bob Fine. Cozart took over recording director duties in 1953 and also produced the CD reissues of more than half of the Mercury Living Presence catalog in the 1990s. By the late 1950s, the Mercury Living Presence crew included session musical supervisors Harold Lawrence and Clair van Ausdall and associate engineer Robert Eberenz. Besides the recordings with the Chicago and Minneapolis orchestras, Mercury also recorded Howard Hanson with the Eastman Rochester Orchestra, Frederick Fennell with the Eastman Wind Ensemble, Paul Paray with the Detroit Symphony Orchestra, as well as early recordings of pianist Byron Janis and the Romero guitar quartet.

In late 1955, Mercury began using three omnidirectional microphones to make stereo recordings on three-track tape. The original LP releases of the classical recordings continued through 1968. The Mercury classical-music catalogue (including the Living Presence catalogue) is currently managed by Decca Label Group through Philips Records, which reissued the recordings on LP and then CD. In turn, Mercury now manages the pop/rock catalog of Philips Records. In 2012, Decca Classics, the current owner of the Mercury Living Presence label, issued a value-priced 51-CD box that included 50 of the 1990s CD titles (remastered by Wilma Cozart Fine), a bonus CD containing an interview with Wilma Cozart Fine, and a deluxe booklet detailing the history of Mercury Living Presence. The CD set was issued worldwide and was sold by major retailers. A limited-edition six-LP box set was also issued. The CD set brings back into print dozens of titles that had not been available as manufactured CDs since the early 2000s.

In 2013, Decca Classics issued a second, 55-CD box set, along with a second six-LP box set. The CD box set included two bonus discs: a new reissue of the 1953 monophonic recording of Stravinsky's "Rite of Spring" by Dorati with the Minneapolis Symphony Orchestra, and a first-time-on-CD reissue of the premiere recording of John Corigliano's Piano Concerto, played by Hilde Somer with the San Antonio Symphony Orchestra conducted by Victor Alessandro.On January 4, 2015, Mercury co-founder Irwin Steinberg died at the age of 94.

== Major Mercury Records labels and operations worldwide ==
This division of Mercury handled US distribution of most pre-1998 Polydor Records pop/rock releases currently under UMG control. Some exceptions remain, however. Some artists based outside the US did not have their releases on Polydor in North America, signing to various other labels, instead. Some of these bands, such as The Who, did sign to a label that also is now part of the UMG family (or later absorbed by such a label), hence those labels control US rights to these works (in the case of The Who, they had been on US Decca Records and MCA Records in the past, their prebreakup catalogue is now on Geffen Records in North America).

=== Mercury KX (formerly Mercury Classics) ===
Mercury Classics was relaunched in 2012 as an international classical label by UMGI, appointing musicologist and record executive Dr. Alexander Buhr as managing director. The label aims to identify and work with strong creative individuals who bring a distinctive and fresh perspective to classical music. In its first year, artist signings to the label included Icelandic neoclassical composer Olafur Arnalds, New York-based string quartet Brooklyn Rider, Austrian clarinetist and Berlin Philharmonic soloist Andreas Ottensamer, and Chinese pianist Yundi. The label also oversees the recording career of Montenegrin classical guitarist Milos Karadaglic, and has an ongoing partnership with Tori Amos, which dates back to her work with Buhr on her classically inspired Night of Hunters album for Deutsche Grammophon in 2011. Following Buhr's longstanding relationship with the Deutsche Grammophon label, some of Mercury Classics' early core classical recordings were rereleased under the aegis of sister company Deutsche Grammophon.

In 2013, Mercury Classics released Olafur Arnalds' label debut For Now I Am Winter, which entered the US Classical Chart at number one. It was followed by an EP of Arnalds' soundtrack of the ITV crime series Broadchurch, which received a BAFTA Award for best original soundtrack the following year. Yundi's recording of three Beethoven sonatas went platinum in his native China. The label also released Andreas Ottensamer's debut "Portraits", and the label debut of Brooklyn Rider "A Walking Fire". Milos Karadaglic's "Latino Gold" topped the UK classical charts and entered the pop charts.

In 2014, Mercury Classics released "Aranjuez", Milos Karadaglic's recording of iconic guitar concertos by Joaquin Rodrigo, featuring Yannick Nézet-Séguin and the London Philharmonic Orchestra. The album topped the iTunes Classical charts in more than 10 countries and the classical charts in the US, UK, France, New Zealand, and Denmark, where it peaked in the pop charts at number 17. With the release of Yundi's new album Emperor/Fantasy, including Beethoven's 5th Piano Concerto with Berlin Philharmonic and Daniel Harding, Mercury Classics held the top two spots on the UK classical chart. In May 2014, the label released Tori Amos' 14th studio album Unrepentant Geraldines. The album entered the US Billboard top 200 at number seven, charted in UK (number 13), Netherlands (number 10), and Germany (number 15), and hit the iTunes top 10 in more than 20 countries. Influential classical music website Alto Riot named Mercury Classics its Label of the Year 2013.In 2016, Mercury Classics became Mercury KX and changed its focus to post-classical music

=== Mercury Nashville ===
Mercury's Nashville unit dates back to 1957, when Mercury formed a joint venture with Starday Records specifically for releasing artists performing country music. Mercury bought out Starday's half in 1958.

In 1997, PolyGram, looking to cut costs in anticipation of a merger with a competitor, consolidated all of its Nashville operations under the Mercury name. Mercury Nashville took over management of all of PolyGram's country back catalog from sister labels such as Polydor (including releases once issued by MGM Records), A&M, and the small country back catalog of Motown Records (Motown released these albums under subsidiary labels). All country artists under contract to other PolyGram labels either moved to Mercury or were dropped altogether.

Today, Mercury Nashville continues to be an active imprint under Music Corporation of America where it continues to manage the country back catalog that once belonged to PolyGram (MCA Nashville manages what Universal had already owned at the time of the PolyGram merger).

=== Mercury Records (UK) ===
Oriole Records was the exclusive UK licensee for Mercury Records from 1950 until 1955. Initially, releases by artists like Frankie Laine and Vic Damone appeared on Oriole imprint, but later, they were released under the Mercury label. As far as can be traced, Eric Delaney and his Band was the sole British artist to appear on the Mercury label. When CBS took over Oriole (1955) releases moved to PYE. In 1958, Mercury switched its distribution in the UK from Pye to EMI, and in 1964 to Philips.

Mercury operated as an imprint in the UK under Phonogram, a division of Dutch electronics company Philips from the mid-1960s until 1998, when Phonogram was bought by Universal Music. In March 2013, its artist roster was moved to Virgin EMI in a restructuring of Universal's UK labels.

In 2005, Jason Iley was appointed the new managing director of Mercury. He joined the company from Island Records, where he was general manager. In July 2005, Iley appointed Paul Adam to senior artist and repertoire (A&R) director of the label; the two had previously worked together at Island Records.

In October 2006, U2 decided to leave Island Records and moved to Mercury Records, reportedly to rejoin Iley, with whom they had worked previously at Island Records.

In March 2011, the label announced it was stopping the production of CD and vinyl singles, and would only release them physically as "rare exceptions".

In 2012, signings on Mercury included Pixie Lott, Arcade Fire, Amy Macdonald, Noah and the Whale, Chase & Status, Jake Bugg, and Bo Bruce.

In July, Mercury announced that Mike Smith was joining as president of its music division.

In March 2013, Mercury UK was absorbed into Virgin EMI by Universal Music. Virgin EMI was rebranded as EMI Records in June 2020.

=== Mercury Records (Australia) ===
Launched in 1955 exclusively as a full-service local (Australian) A&R operation. Mercury Records first known Australian artist was Keith Potger in 1968, but the label was put into hibernation in 1999 in favour of the Universal label until 2007–2013. In 2019 former Mercury Records Australia CEO Tim Delaney took up a position as CEO of UK indies Funnel Music. Some successful Australian artists on Mercury included: INXS, Kamahl, Bullamakanka, Darren Hayes, Carl Riseley, The Preatures, Tiddas, Dragon, Teen Queens, Melissa Tkautz and Karise Eden.

=== Mercury Records (France) ===
In France, Mercury Records operates as a part of the Mercury Music Group, a division of Universal Music Group, which Group controls the French operations of UMG labels Mercury, Fontana Records, Verve Records, Decca Records, Blue Note Records, Island Records, and Virgin Records, among others. Mercury Records France released Johnny Hallyday, Georges Brassens, and Edit Piaf albums

Various other national Universal Music Group companies are known to actively use the Mercury Records trademark as an imprint for their local A&R operations, but no other Universal Music Group companies use the label as a key marketing differentiator, nor do they operate frontline divisions based on the Mercury label.

=== Mercury Tokyo (formerly Mercury Music Entertainment, Nippon Phonogram and Kitty MME) ===
The Mercury label was first launched in Japan in 1952, by Taihei Onkyo. The company's name was later changed to Nippon Mercury in 1953, however, the Mercury label started to be handled by King Records in 1957, and later by the Victor Company of Japan (JVC).

It was relaunched in 1970 by JVC and Matsushita Corporation, as Nippon Phonogram. It operated several Phonogram labels in Japan, including Philips and Mercury. The Philips label was slowly phased out over the years and its domestic Japanese sector was replaced by Mercury in 1988. The Philips label is still used for reissues, international, and classical/jazz releases. In 1993, it became a division of PolyGram K.K. (now Universal Music Japan). In 1995, it was relaunched as Mercury Music Entertainment. It later merged with Kitty Records in 2000 and became Kitty MME. All of UMJ's 3 flagship labels: Polydor, Universal (MCA), and Kitty MME, was merged into the Universal J label in 2002. Kitty MME was revived as Kitty Records under the Universal Sigma division in 2004, but shortly disappeared.

After 13 years, the label was revitalized under its new name, Mercury Tokyo, under the Universal Music Group and Brands (UMG and Brands) division of Universal Music Japan. K-pop group Monsta X is the first artist or group signed under the newly relaunched label. As of 2022, the label, currently operating under UMJ's EMI Records division, has added K-pop groups Drippin, Golden Child, Loona, and STAYC on its roster.

== See also ==
- Chicago record labels
- List of Mercury Records artists
- List of record labels
- On Air (streaming service)
