= The Film Daily =

Former film trade news magazine

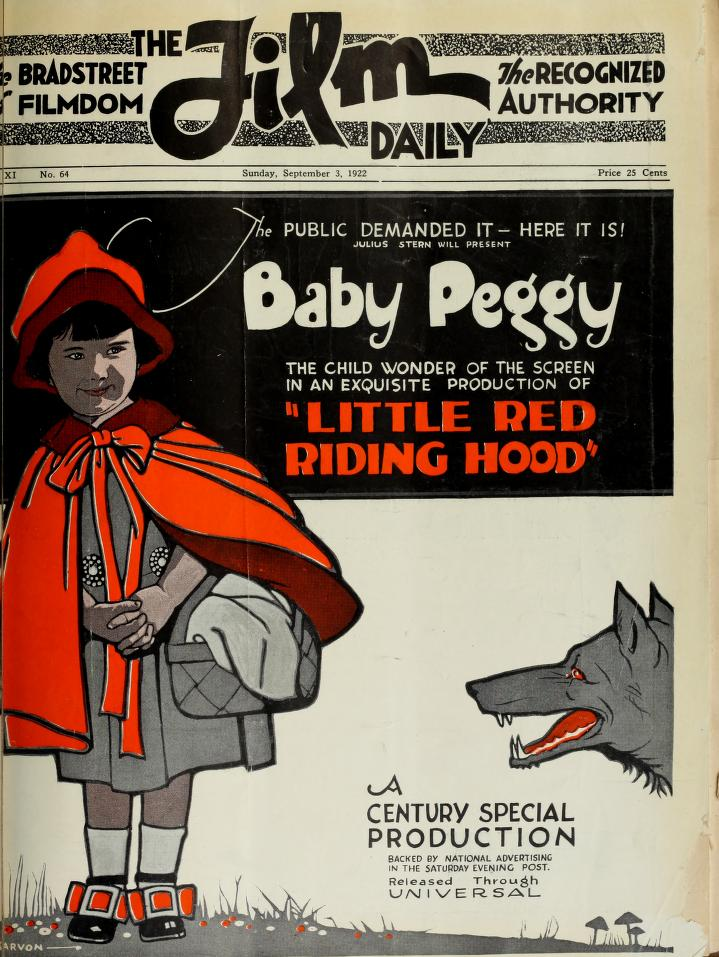
- September 3, 1922 cover of The Film Daily with child actress Baby Peggy
- Categories: Film
- Publisher: Wid's Films and Film Folk, Inc.
- First issue: 1913 (daily in 1918)
- Final issue: 1970
- Country: United States
- Language: English
- OCLC: 174072329

The Film Daily was an American daily film trade publication that existed from 1918 to 1970. It was the first daily newspaper published solely for the film industry. It covered the latest trade news, film reviews, financial updates, information on court cases and union difficulties, and equipment breakthroughs.

== Publication history ==
The publication was originated by Wid Gunning in 1913 (though not as a daily) and was known as Wid's Film and Film Folk (1915–1916) and Wid's Independent Review of Feature Films (1916–1918). Gunning was previously film editor at the New York Evening Mail. He also published Wid's Weekly, and Wid's Year Book.

In 1918, Joseph ("Danny") Dannenberg and Jack Alicoate purchased an interest in Wid's Weekly. On March 8, 1918, they released a daily publication, Wid's Daily. In 1921, Dannenberg and Alicoate took control of Wid's Films & Film Folk Inc., with Dannenberg as president and editor, and the publication changed name, in 1922, to The Film Daily.

During Dannenberg's time, the film yearbook (first published in 1918 as Wid's Year Book) expanded in size from 160 pages in 1918 to 860 pages in 1926. Dannenburg died March 11, 1926, and was succeeded as president and editor by Jack Alicoate, who also became publisher.

Chester B. Bahn became editor in 1937 but Alicoate remained as publisher until his death in 1960. Alicoate's brother Charles became executive publisher, and took over active management, a few years before Jack's death.

Jack Alicoate added another publication, Radio Daily, in February 1937. In September 1950, the publication was renamed Radio Daily-Television Daily. The publication ceased in the late 1960s.

In 1969, Charles Alicoate sold Film Daily to DFI Communications who installed Hugh Fordin as editor-in-chief and associate publisher in December 1969. After publishing the June 1, 1970 issue, production was suspended with plans to redesign and further enliven the publication.

The Film Daily Yearbook of Motion Pictures OCLC 38095889 was published in 1929, 1945, ceased with 51st edition in 1969.

Primary Source Microfilm republished the entire periodical on microfilm in 1990, in a 125 reel set. The Media History Digital Library has scans of the archive of Film Daily from 1918 to 1948 and Wid's Weekly from 1923 to 1925 available online and most years of the Film Daily Year Book (including two editions as Wid's Year Book) from 1918 to 1951.

The Internet Archive has The Film Daily, volume 5 (July 1918) to volume 70 (December 1936).

Motion Picture World, Motion Picture World Magazine Company, New York City.

== Annual Critics' Poll ==
Film Daily was best known for its annual year-end critics' poll, in which hundreds of professional movie critics from around the country submitted their votes for the best films of the year, which the magazine then tallied and published as a top ten list. It was not uncommon for a film to win for a year that actually came after the year it first premiered, since the rollover date for each year's eligibility cycle was typically November 1 and the film was required to be in general release. Gone with the Wind, for example, premiered in 1939 but didn't become eligible until 1941 when it switched from a roadshow format to a general release. No winner was named in 1950 because for that year only, separate categories were polled for Drama of the Year and Musical of the Year (won by Sunset Boulevard and Annie Get Your Gun, respectively).

=== Critics' Poll Results ===
Year	Winning film	Runner-up	Cite(s)
1922	Orphans of the Storm	Grandma's Boy	
1923	The Covered Wagon	Merry-Go-Round	
1924	The Thief of Bagdad	The Sea Hawk	
1925	The Gold Rush	The Unholy Three	
1926	Variety	Ben-Hur	
1927	Beau Geste	The Big Parade	
1928	The Patriot	Sorrell and Son	
1929	Disraeli	The Broadway Melody	
1930	All Quiet on the Western Front	Abraham Lincoln	
1931	Cimarron	Street Scene	
1932	Grand Hotel	The Champ	
1933	Cavalcade	42nd Street	
1934	The Barretts of Wimpole Street	The House of Rothschild	
1935	David Copperfield	The Lives of a Bengal Lancer	
1936	Mutiny on the Bounty	Mr. Deeds Goes to Town	
1937	The Life of Emile Zola	The Good Earth	
1938	Snow White and the Seven Dwarfs	You Can't Take It with You	
1939	Goodbye, Mr. Chips	Mr. Smith Goes to Washington	
1940	Rebecca	The Grapes of Wrath	
1941	Gone with the Wind	Sergeant York	
1942	Mrs. Miniver	How Green Was My Valley	
1943	Random Harvest	For Whom the Bell Tolls	
1944	Going My Way	The Song of Bernadette	
1945	Wilson	A Tree Grows in Brooklyn	
1946	The Lost Weekend	The Green Years	
1947	The Best Years of Our Lives	The Jolson Story	
1948	Gentleman's Agreement	Johnny Belinda	
1949	The Snake Pit	The Red Shoes	
1950	category not polled	-	
1951	A Place in the Sun	A Streetcar Named Desire	
1952	High Noon	The Quiet Man	
1953	From Here to Eternity	Shane	
1954	The Caine Mutiny	On the Waterfront	
1955	Mister Roberts	Marty	
1956	The King and I	Giant	
1957	Around the World in 80 Days	Sayonara	
1958	The Bridge on the River Kwai	Cat on a Hot Tin Roof	
1959	Anatomy of a Murder	The Diary of Anne Frank	
1960	The Apartment	Elmer Gantry	
1961	The Guns of Navarone	The Hustler	
1962	The Manchurian Candidate	The Music Man	
1963	Tom Jones	Hud	
1964	My Fair Lady	Becket	
1965	The Sound of Music	Ship of Fools	
1966	Who's Afraid of Virginia Woolf?	The Russians Are Coming, the Russians Are Coming	
1967	In the Heat of the Night	Bonnie and Clyde	
1968	The Lion in Winter	Rosemary's Baby	
1969	Midnight Cowboy	Butch Cassidy and the Sundance Kid	
