= Peter Dobkin Hall =

American author and historian (1946–2015)

Peter Dobkin Hall (February 22, 1946 – April 30, 2015) was an American author and historian. He was Professor of History and Theory in the School of Public Affairs at Baruch College, City University of New York, and Senior Research Fellow at the Harvard Kennedy School's Hauser Center for Nonprofit Organizations.

== Biography ==
Hall was born to David Hall, recorded sound archivist, and Bernice Dobkin. He received his BA in American Studies at Reed College in 1968 and his MA (1970) and PhD (1973) in American History from the State University of New York at Stony Brook.

Hall held appointments at Wesleyan (1974–1982), Yale (1983–1999), and Harvard (since 2000). He was a founding member of Yale's Program on Non-Profit Organizations and served as its director from 1996 to 1999. In 1993, Hall received the John Grenzebach Award for Outstanding Research in Philanthropy for Education from the AAFRC Trust for Philanthropy and the Council for Advancement and Support of Education. In 2008, he was given the ARNOVA Award for Distinguished Achievement in Nonprofit and Voluntary Action Research.

Hall edited the Hauser Center blog, Nonprofit News & Comment, a weekly survey of major press coverage of philanthropy, nonprofits, and related topics. Active in historic preservation, he was a co-founder of the New Haven Urban Design League and a trustee of the New Haven Museum.

On April 30, 2015, Hall was killed in a head-on car collision after he traveled the wrong way on Interstate 95 near Branford, Connecticut.

== Bibliography ==
- The Organization of American Culture, 1700-1900: Institutions, Elites, and the Origins of American Nationality (1982) ISBN 0-8147-3415-4 (paperback)
- With Karyl Lee Kibler Hall, The Lehigh Valley: An Illustrated History (1982) ISBN 0-89781-044-9 (hardcover)
- Inventing the Nonprofit Sector and Other Essays on Philanthropy, Voluntarism, and Nonprofit Organizations (1992) ISBN 0-8018-6979-X (paperback)
- With George E. Marcus, Lives in Trust: The Fortunes of Dynastic Families in Late Twentieth Century America (1992) ISBN 0-8133-0464-4 (hardcover) and ISBN 0-8133-0467-9 (paperback)
- Co-edited with N.J. Demerath III, Rhys H. Williams, & Terry Schmitt, Sacred Companies: Organizational Aspects of Religion and Religious Aspects of Organizations (1998) ISBN 0-19-511322-5 (hardcover).
- Co-editor with Colin B. Burke, of the chapter on nonprofit organizations, voluntary associations, and religious entities in "Historical Statistics of the United States, Millennial Edition" (2006) ISBN 9780521817912

== See also ==
- Hauser Center for Nonprofit Organizations
