= Wes Harrison =

American comedian and voice actor)

- Born: January 31, 1925; Spartanburg, South Carolina, U.S.
- Died: July 21, 2019 (aged 94)
- Occupations: Comedian; voice actor

Wesley Bryon Harrison (January 31, 1925 - July 21, 2019), better known as Wes Harrison and nicknamed Mr. Sound Effects, was an American comedian and voice actor, notable for his ability to create realistic sound effects using only his voice and a Shure 530 Slendyne microphone. Harrison had a comic style reminiscent of Red Skelton.

Harrison was born in Spartanburg, South Carolina in January 1925. In 1941 Harrison was working as a counselor at a YMCA Boy's Camp on the Chesapeake Bay. While there, he installed a public address system to summon stray campers. This sound system was equipped with a powerful amplifier and three horn loudspeakers. Here he began his first experiments with vocal sound effects.

A short time later, Harrison was drafted into the Navy. During this time, he worked in special services entertaining the troops, and here developed an act which led to his winning five consecutive Horace Heidt Programs. After World War II, he went to University of Texas at Arlington (then known as Arlington State College) and studied electrical engineering. The Korean War broke out and he was called back into the Navy. Altogether, he spent eight years in the Navy.

Returning to civilian life, he appeared on the Arthur Godfrey talent scout show and won. He was on the original Major Bowes Amateur Hour back in the 1940s. Ted Mack (radio-TV host) gave him a real start and sent him on his way into show business. From that time on, things really started snow-balling for Harrison. He appeared on the Ed Sullivan, Jack Paar, Garry Moore, Mike Douglas, Dean Martin, Roger Miller, and the Merv Griffin shows, and filled a complete schedule of nightclub work.

During his career, Harrison contributed sound effects to many films such as Peter Pan, 20,000 Leagues Under the Sea and the Tom and Jerry cartoon series.

Harrison resided in Des Plaines, Illinois and flew his own plane. He continued to make public appearances later in life, often appearing at hunting and fishing expos around the country.

== Sources ==
- "You Won't Believe Your Ears" LP Liner Notes
- "The One and Only" LP Liner Notes
- "Producing Great Sound For Video" (book) - by Jay Rose (2003)

== Discography ==
- Wes Harrison - Fun With Sounds
- You Won't Believe Your Ears (1963)
- The One and the Only (1969)
- Track "TNT" by Ronnie Rice - Refried Rice (1997)
- Canadian Titanic Society for "Whistles" on "CTS's" 20.75ft "Titanic" model/float for "in-door" exhibit!
