= Media History Digital Library =

Open access digital archive

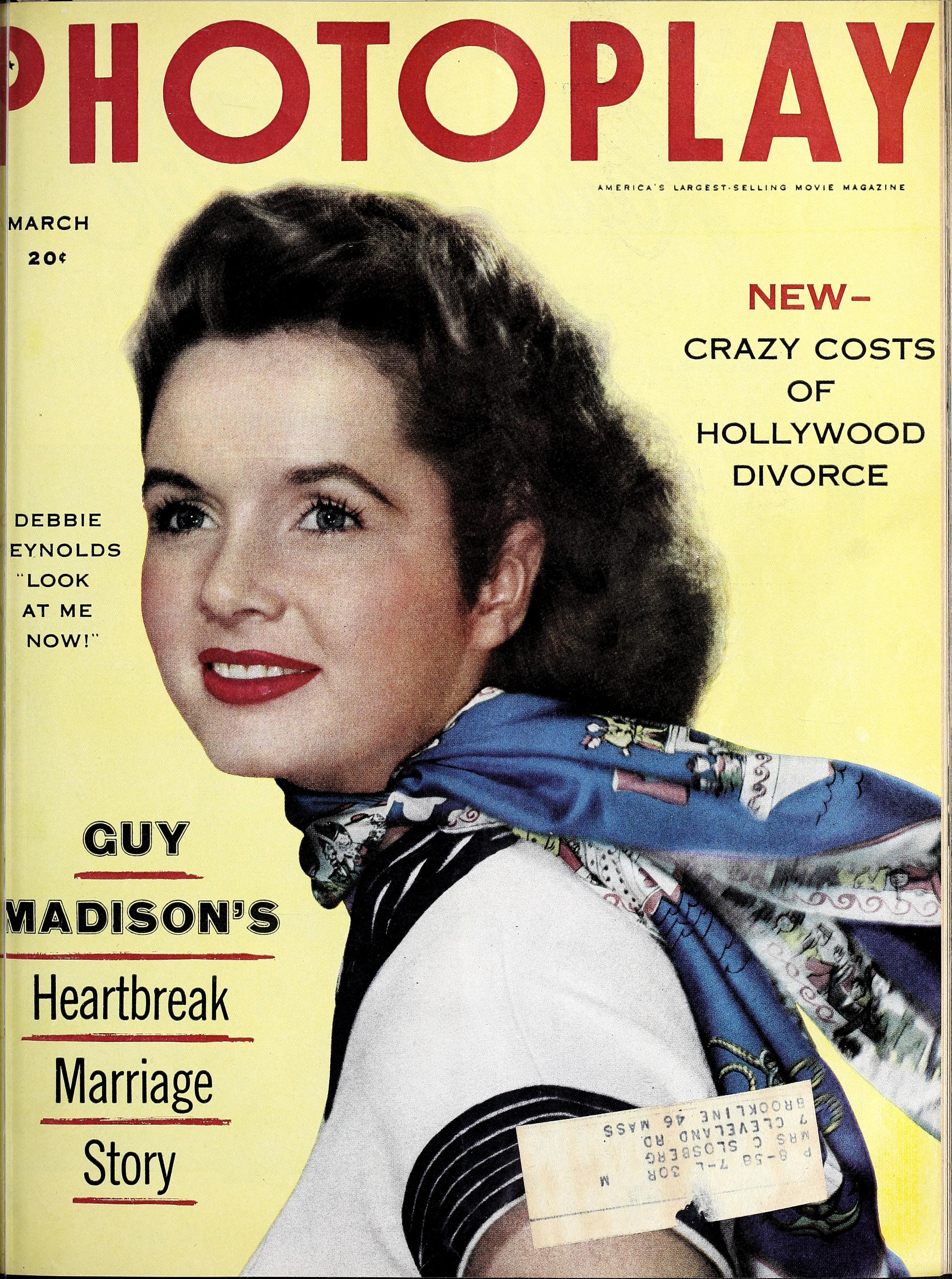
Debbie Reynolds pictured on the cover of Photoplay, March 1954. Accessed via the Media History Digital Library

The Media History Digital Library (MHDL) is a non-profit, open access digital archive founded by David Pierce and directed by Eric Hoyt that compiles books, magazines, and other print materials related to the histories of film, broadcasting, and recorded sound and makes these materials accessible online for free. The MHDL both digitizes physical materials and acquires digital copies from outside libraries, archives, collectors, and other collaborators. Most of the material in its more than 2.5 million pages is in the public domain and therefore free for all to use with no restrictions.

Projects of the Media History Digital Library include its search engine Lantern and its data visualization platform Arclight. The Media History Digital Library is led by the Wisconsin Center for Film and Theater Research at the University of Wisconsin–Madison, in Madison, Wisconsin. Film and media studies librarian James Steffen has called the MHDL one of "the two most important digital collections today for studying media industries."

== History ==
Film historian David Pierce founded the Media History Digital Library in 2009 to address the scholarly and fan communities' lack of access to historical film industry publications such as trade papers and fan magazines. Even those documents that had been transferred to microfilm were infrequently digitized, making both the original works and any microfilm copies only available at specific libraries, archives, and private collections. Having knowledge of copyright laws, Pierce determined that while many early Hollywood films, kinescopes, recordings, and similar materials would be protected by copyright, most publications would not. Working with partners at collections such as the Museum of Modern Art Library, the Academy of Motion Picture Arts and Sciences' Margaret Herrick Library, and the Library of Congress National Audio Visual Conservation Center as well as private collectors, Pierce began to scan the original copies of many of these publications documenting the early history of film, broadcasting, and recorded sound.

In 2011, Pierce and fellow film history scholar Eric Hoyt built a website to expand access to the more than 200,000 pages of movie magazines they had digitized, which would be hosted on the Internet Archive. Hoyt launched the search platform Lantern in 2013 and in 2014 began work on Arclight, a data visualization platform.

Pierce stepped down as director in 2017 and Hoyt assumed the position, bringing it fully under the purview of the University of Wisconsin-Madison. In 2021, Hoyt became director of the Wisconsin Center for Film and Theater Research and brought the MHDL under its leadership.

== Collections and tools ==
The Media History Digital Library's collections include millions of digitized pages and focus on out-of-copyright works from the early history of film, broadcasting, and recorded sound. The data is hosted by the Internet Archive. Its major collections include fan magazines, global cinema publications, Hollywood pressbooks, and trade papers. As of 2011, the MHDL collection encompassed more than 200,000 pages. By 2013, the total had reached about 489,000 pages, and by 2014, that number had grown to 800,000. In July 2022, MHDL director Eric Hoyt announced on Twitter that the collection had reached "roughly 3 million pages," and the Lantern homepage said it was "now searching 2,827,907 pages."

=== Collections ===
MHDL collections are free to use and download. They are searchable at the page level, but users can also access the full volumes via links to the Internet Archive. All page records include detailed reference information for the complete volume. Collections include short, informative descriptions written by scholars in the field to contextualize the content of each grouping.

==== U.S. Collections ====
Documents in the MHDL collections include issues from both prominent and obscure magazines and trade papers that are now out of copyright and therefore in the public domain. Notable publications that continue to this day include The Hollywood Reporter, Variety, Billboard, and Boxoffice. Major publications of significance to historians include Motion Picture Daily, Moving Picture World, Photoplay, Film Daily, Motion Picture Herald, Motography, and the New York Clipper.

The MHDL organizes its U.S.-published materials under the following headings:

- Books
- Broadcasting & recorded sound
- Early cinema
- Fan magazines
- Government & law
- Hollywood studio system
- Magic lantern
- Non-theatrical film
- Pressbooks
- Technical journals
- Theatre & vaudeville
- Yearbooks

==== Global Collections ====
The MHDL's global cinema collection contains publications from around the world in the following countries and regions:

- China
- Europe
- France
- Germany
  - Includes Der Kinematograph and Die Lichtbildbühne, two leading publications that documented the German film industry through the Weimar period, rise of German Expressionism, and fall during the rise of the Nazis.
- India
- Iran
- Italy
- Japan
- Latin America and Spanish-speaking United States
- Netherlands
- Switzerland
- United Kingdom

=== Lantern ===
Lantern is the MHDL's primary search platform with a visualization component. It allows users to search the collections using keywords, title, year, author, subject, publisher, and/or description. First launched in 2011 by David Pierce and Eric Hoyt with Carl Hagenmaier and Wendy Hagenmaier, it was re-launched in 2022 with a design by Samuel Hansen and Ben Pettis. The search engine reads the text on every page of the MHDL's nearly 3 million pages as well as their metadata and returns the result with a preview image of the pages on which the text is displayed. In 2014, Hoyt published an article in Film History explaining the search engine's goals, methods, and concerns. He argued that scholars too frequently rely on "canonical" texts such as Variety and thus outlined the need for better data visualization tools.

=== Arclight ===
Primarily intended for scholars of the digital humanities and film history, Arclight searches the text of all pages in MHDL collections to retrieve and visualize data about keywords and trends within a given timeframe. It primarily shows the number of pages on which a search term appears, but users can also adjust the results to show the number of pages as a percentage of the total MHDL holdings. The project was funded by a "Digging into Data" grant from the Institute for Museum and Library Services in the United States and the Social Sciences and Humanities Research Council in Canada. It was inspired by contemporary social science researchers' use of platforms like Twitter Analytics to study online conversation. The project's co-creators, Eric Hoyt and Charles R. Acland, published an edited collection, The Arclight Guidebook to Media History and the Digital Humanities outlining the method, design, and ways of using the platform.

=== Teaching resources ===
The MHDL curates and makes freely available lesson plans, toolkits, and assignments both for instructors looking to incorporate its collections into their classrooms and for students of all levels. These resources range from tutorials for those using the MHDL, Lantern, and Arclight for the first time to suggestions for experienced researchers looking to expand the scope of their work. MHDL collaborators also give presentations and workshops at various academic conferences, such as the 2021 HoMER Conference and the 2022 International Association for Media and History Conference.

== Awards ==
- Society for Cinema and Media Studies' Anne Friedberg Innovative Scholarship Award, for Lantern (2014)
- Pop Culture Association's Electronic Reference Award, for Lantern (2014)
- American Association of School Librarians' Best Digital Tools (2014)
- Institute for Museum and Library Services and Social Sciences and Humanities Research Council's Digging into Data Challenge (2013)
- International Association for Media and History's Michael Nelson Prize for a Work in Media and History (2013)
- Pop Culture Association's Electronic Reference Award, for Media History Digital Library (2012)

== Literature using MHDL resources ==
=== Books ===
- Ink-Stained Hollywood: The Triumph of American Cinema's Trade Press (2022), by Eric Hoyt
- Buster Keaton: A Filmmaker's Life (2022), by James Curtis
- Mapping Movie Magazines: Digitization, Periodicals, and Cinema History (2021), edited by Daniel Biltereyst and Lies Van de Vijver
- Everyday Movies: Portable Film Projectors and the Transformation of American Culture (2020), by Haidee Wasson
- Applied Media Studies (2018), edited by Kristen Ostherr
- Locating Classical Receptions on Screen Masks, Echoes, Shadows (2018), edited by Anastasia Bakogianni and Ricado Apostol
- A Companion to Ancient Greece and Rome on Screen (2017), edited by Arthur J. Pomeroy
- Hollywood Vault: Film Libraries before Home Video (2014), by Eric Hoyt

=== Articles, chapters, and essays ===
- "'How's Your Sense of Direction?' Using Movie Magazines to Study Audiences' Perception of Classical Hollywood Directors, 1934–1943," by Dominic Topp
- "'The keenest, most intimate analysis': Profiling Female Stars of the Silent Screen in Photoplay Magazine," by Elizabeth Podnieks
- "'Frankenstein Complex' in the Realm of Digital Humanities: Data Mining Classic Horror Cinema via Media History Digital Library, by Tianyu Jiang
- "Digital Humanities and Media History: A Challenge for Historical Newspaper Research," by Huub Wijfjes
- "Browsing the Digital Stacks: Exploring Technology Journals on the Media History Digital Library," by Derek Long
- "Locked in the Coffin: Bela Lugosi and the Paradox of the Picture Personality," by ABC
- "Who's Trending in 1910s American Cinema? Exploring ECHO and MHDL at Scale with Arclight," by Derek Long, Eric Hoyt, Kevin Ponto, Tony Tran, and Kit Hughes
- "Deaf and Hard-of-Hearing Audiences and the Fallout of the Talkies, 1910–1968," by Will Gotlib
- "Arclights and Zoom Lenses," by Eric Hoyt, in The Routledge Companion to New Cinema History
- "Modeling Media History," by Pelle Snickars
- "Maternal Stars of the Silent Screen: Gender, Genre, and Photoplay Magazine" by Elizabeth Podnieks
- "Reconsidering the Archive: Digitization and Latin American Film Historiography," by Rielle Navitski
- "Amateur cinematics: Watson and Webber's The Fall of the House of Usher," by Dwight Swanson

=== Reviews ===
The MHDL, Lantern, and Arclight have been reviewed in academic journals, including:

- Publicaciones de la Asociación Argentina de Humanidades Digitales (2021), Pamela Gionco
- Journal of American History (2020), by Katie Day Good
- Media Industries (2017), by James Steffen
- American Journalism (2014), by Michael Stamm
