= Berle Adams =

American music industry executive (1917–2009)

- Born: Beryl Adasky; June 11, 1917; Chicago, U.S.
- Died: 25 August 2009 (aged 92); Los Angeles, U.S.
- Occupation(s): Record executive Band booking agent television producer

Berle Adams (born Beryl Adasky, 11 June 1917 – 25 August 2009) was an American music industry executive and talent booking agent best known for co-founding Mercury Records in the 1940s and later becoming a senior executive at MCA.

== Early life ==
Adams was born in 1917 to immigrants from Russia on the West Side of Chicago, the son of Etta (née Block), a homemaker, and Jack Adasky, a milkman. His mother died when he was 18 months old. He went to Crane Technical High School. Adams became attracted to late night remote radio broadcasts of America's swing bands, including those of Tommy and Jimmy Dorsey, Charlie Barnet, Bob Crosby, Glenn Miller, and Benny Goodman. While still in high school, Adams began renting speaker systems and booking bands, school proms, weddings, men's and women's benevolent organizations, fire department and chamber of commerce socials.

== Early career ==
With support from established bandleader Al Trace, Adams briefly worked as a band booker. Adams left the music business temporarily, married his neighborhood sweetheart Lucy Leven, and began selling life insurance door-to-door. Insurance sales during the Depression proved unprofitable. Adams talked his way into a job for Varsity Records, promoting the tiny company's little-known artists for space on the city's jukeboxes against stars recording for industry giants like RCA Victor and Decca.

== GAC and Louis Jordan ==
Adams was hired by GAC, where he studied the one-night band booking practices of GAC's Joe Shribman and determined to become an agent. In one of his earliest efforts, he managed to introduce bandleader Louis Jordan and his Tympany Five to Chicago café lounges in May 1941. The Jordan association lasted nine years and solidly established the careers of both men.

Over the next few years, Adams represented clarinetist Jimmie Noone, saxophonists Ben Webster and Coleman Hawkins, boogie woogie stylists Albert Ammons and Pete Johnson, Fats Waller, Art Tatum, and young saxophonist Illinois Jacquet. Adams booked road dates for Glenn Miller, Woody Herman, Charlie Spivak, Claude Thornhill, Nat King Cole, The Andrews Sisters, Joe Venuti, and Jimmy Dorsey. In 1943, Adams left GAC to become Jordan's personal manager and established the Berle Adams Agency.

== Mercury Records ==
In 1944, Adams established the Champagne Music and Preview Music publishing companies and the next year he formed the Mercury Radio and Television Company, which became Mercury Records, with partners Irving Green, Ray Greenberg, and Art Talmadge.

Mercury soon began recording Erroll Garner, Dinah Washington, Frances Langford, Glen Gray and the Casa Loma Orchestra, Tony Martin, and employing Mitch Miller and Norman Granz as producers.

In 1946, Mercury recorded Frankie Laine's version of the 1931 tune "That's My Desire," and it became the singer's first hit. Other successes followed at Mercury, including Vic Damone's "I Have But One Heart," which launched the singer's career.

== Movies and TV ==
In 1946, with Bud Pollard, Adams co-produced the Astor Pictures race film Beware!, starring Louis Jordan.

In 1947, Adams left Chicago for Los Angeles, for health reasons. He resigned from Mercury Records and moved with wife Lucy and their children, Helen and Richard. Adams soon became the booking agent for singer Kay Starr.

Adams was hired in 1950 by Lew Wasserman to join MCA, where he remained for 20 years. He began by booking for television and appearances in Las Vegas such stars as Jane Russell, Dinah Shore, Phil Harris, Jack Carson, and Dean Martin and Jerry Lewis.

Booking talent for local TV in Los Angeles led to assignments in network TV. Adams worked closely with Ralph Edwards ("The Ralph Edwards Show") in developing a creative packaging arrangement with NBC whereby the host talent—Edwards—formed a corporation and licensed a particular show with the network for a predetermined figure and paid the producer, director, and star guests, as well as all of the "below-the-line" or backstage personnel himself. The virtue of packaging lay in the creative control retained by the host and in tax advantages afforded corporations.

Adams' chief responsibility for MCA became the packaging of new programs and negotiation of their contracts. In 1957 he went to Europe to create MCA's international TV division. He signed stand-up comic Bob Newhart, booked him into clubs, and soon sold "The Bob Newhart Show" to NBC. The show ran for only one year but won a Peabody Award and an Emmy nomination.

== Golden years at MCA ==
The 1960s was the decade of greatest creative energy and achievement in Adams' career. He became the MCA agent for Jack Benny, Rosemary Clooney, Eddie Fisher, Dinah Shore, Bud Yorkin and Norman Lear, Andy Williams, Dorothy Dandridge, Canadian comedians Wayne and Shuster, Charles Laughton, and Alfred Hitchcock. He convinced Marlene Dietrich to star in a revue that would cross the country in 16 weeks.

He negotiated MCA's contract to represent the new American Football League and in 1963 helped long-time MCA colleague David A. ("Sonny") Werblin acquire the New York Titans franchise of the AFL from former announcer Harry Wismer. Werblin changed the team name to the New York Jets, two years later drafted Joe Namath out of the University of Alabama, and the Jets were on their way to the Super Bowl. A lifelong sports fan, Adams one day was attracted by the sight of a golfer on TV who seemed to be a natural showman. Working through pioneer sports agent and attorney Mark McCormack, Adams signed Arnold Palmer and Jack Nicklaus for a weekly one-hour nationally broadcast Challenge Golf show.

In 1962, after MCA purchased Decca Records, which owned Universal Pictures, he left the talent agency business for film and television production and distribution. Wasserman asked Adams, now an MCA vice-president, to streamline the film studio's 30 distribution offices around the world in the interest of economy. Adams visited each of the domestic and foreign offices and successfully reduced the number of offices to eight.

Adams negotiated the purchase of Leeds Music, and established a new MCA music company, UNI Records. UNI Records signed The Who, Neil Diamond, Elton John, and Olivia Newton-John to recording contracts. In England, under MCA's Decca label, Adams and MCA colleague Brian Brolly signed Andrew Lloyd Webber and Tim Rice to record the score of their early hit Jesus Christ Superstar.

Adams convinced Ethel Merman, Danny Kaye, Gene Kelly, and Fred Astaire each to appear in television specials. An Evening with Fred Astaire (1958) won nine Emmy Awards.

In October 1969, Adams, by now executive vice-president of MCA and second in company earnings only to Wasserman, found himself at the center of an internal power struggle within the company. Lew Wasserman urged "voluntary retirement", the magnate's euphemism for dismissal. Adams' 20-year career with MCA ended formally in early 1971.

== BAC Inc. ==
He formed a corporation, BAC Inc., and for a couple of years following his termination, Adams served on the boards of KCET public television in Los Angeles and TelePrompTer. He was retained by ARA, Inc., as consultant and negotiated the sale of the Spectrum arena in Philadelphia.

In 1973, Adams joined the William Morris Agency and during a short interval directed marketing events surrounding Hank Aaron's 715th home run, surpassing the career record of Babe Ruth. In 1978 he was executive producer for "The Brass Target," a feature film starring Sophia Loren, John Cassavetes, George Kennedy, Robert Vaughan, and Max von Sydow.

In his later active years as head of BAC Inc., Adams distributed the TV specials of George Burns, Dolly Parton, Neil Diamond, Goldie Hawn, Cher, Dean Martin, Liberace, and Nat King Cole, among others. For 24 years he was the sole distributor of TV's Emmy Awards show to more than 100 countries.

== Personal life ==
His wife Lucy Adams died of cancer on April 1, 1990. Both she and her husband had, long before her illness, become interested in cancer research. Adams joined Cancer Research Associates, the support group of the University of Southern California's Norris Cancer Center and Hospital, and in 1985 he became the organization's president. The Adams family—Berle, his children Helen and Richard, and their families, established the Berle and Lucy Adams Chair in Cancer Research at USC's Keck School of Medicine. His cousin was Los Angeles County Sheriff Sherman Block. Services were held at Mount Sinai Memorial Park.

In 1995, Adams self-published his autobiography, A Sucker for Talent. In 2009, he died in Los Angeles at age 92.
