= Wilma Cozart Fine =

American record producer

Wilma Cozart Fine (March 29, 1927, Aberdeen, Mississippi – September 21, 2009, Harrison, New York) was an American record producer She produced hundreds of recordings, particularly the Mercury Living Presence series. According to her 2009 obituary in The New York Times, the recordings remain "prized by collectors for the depth and realism of their sound."

A native of Fort Worth, Texas, she attended the University of North Texas studying music education at the UNT College of Music and business.

In 2011, Cozart Fine was awarded a posthumous Grammy Trustees Award for her significant contributions to the recording industry.
