= Tony Orlando and Dawn discography =

- Studio albums: 9
- Compilation albums: 17
- Singles: 26
- Video albums: 1

This is the discography of American pop group Tony Orlando and Dawn.

== Albums ==
=== Studio albums ===
Title	Album details	Peak chart positions				Certifications
Title	Album details	US	AUS	CAN	NOR	Certifications
Candida	Released: November 1970; Label: Bell; Formats: LP, MC, 8-track	35	—	26	—	
Dawn Featuring Tony Orlando	Released: November 1971; Label: Bell; Formats: LP, MC	165	—	—	—	
Tuneweaving	Released: March 1973; Label: Bell; Formats: LP, MC, 8-track; Released in the UK and Europe as Tie a Yellow Ribbon	30	—	15	13	RIAA: Gold
Dawn's New Ragtime Follies	Released: September 1973; Label: Bell; Formats: LP, MC, 8-track	43	27	68	—	RIAA: Gold
Prime Time	Released: November 1974; Label: Bell; Formats: LP, MC, 8-track	16	—	56	—	
He Don't Love You (Like I Love You)	Released: April 1975; Label: Elektra; Formats: LP, MC, 8-track	20	—	62	—	
Skybird	Released: October 1975; Label: Arista; Formats: LP, MC, 8-track	93	—	—	—	
To Be with You	Released: February 1976; Label: Elektra; Formats: LP, MC, 8-track	94	—	87	—	
A Christmas Reunion	Release date: October 11, 2005; Label: R2 Entertainment; Formats: CD	—	—	—	—	
"—" denotes releases that did not chart or were not released in that territory.

=== Compilation albums ===
Title	Album details	Peak chart positions				Certifications
Title	Album details	US	CAN	NZ	UK	Certifications
Look at Dawn	Released: 1972; Label: EMI; Formats: LP; UK-only release	—	—	—	—	
Golden Ribbons	Released: May 1974; Label: Bell; Formats: LP, MC, 8-track	—	88	—	46	
Greatest Hits	Released: June 1975; Label: Arista; Formats: LP, MC, 8-track	16	48	36	—	RIAA: Gold
The World of Tony Orlando & Dawn	Released: June 1976; Label: Arista; Formats: 2xLP, 2xMC, 8-track	—	—	—	—	
An Evening with Tony Orlando & Dawn	Released: 1977; Label: Chelsea House; Formats: 2xLP, 2xMC, 2x8-track	—	—	—	—	
The Tony Orlando & Dawn Collection	Released: 1979; Label: Arista/Capitol Special Markets; Formats: LP, MC, 8-track; Canada-only release	—	—	—	—	
The Very Best of Dawn Featuring Tony Orlando	Released: 1980; Label: Pickwick Super Stars; Formats: LP; UK-only release	—	—	—	—	
Tie a Yellow Ribbon	Released: 1980; Label: IMP; Formats: LP; UK-only release	—	—	—	—	
House of Strangers	Released: 1993; Label: Fat Boy; Formats: CD; UK-only release	—	—	—	—	
The Best of Tony Orlando & Dawn	Release date: 1995; Label: Rhino; Formats: CD, MC	—	—	—	—	
The Very Best of Dawn Featuring Tony Orlando	Release date: February 1997; Label: Camden; Formats: CD, MC	—	—	—	—	
The Definitive Collection	Release date: October 27, 1998; Label: Arista; Formats: CD	—	—	—	—	
Knock Three Times: Encore Collection	Release date: August 3, 1999; Label: BMG; Formats: CD, MC	—	—	—	—	
Greatest Hits	Released: 1999; Label: Brilliant; Formats: CD; UK-only release	—	—	—	—	
Platinum & Gold Collection	Released: June 17, 2003; Label: Arista/BMG Heritage; Formats: CD; UK-only release	—	—	—	—	
Legends	Released: February 2005; Label: Camden/BMG; Formats: 3xCD	—	—	—	—	
The Yellow Ribbon Collection	Released: September 27, 2005; Label: R2 Entertainment; Formats: 6xCD	—	—	—	—	
"—" denotes releases that did not chart or were not released in that territory.

=== Video albums ===
Title	Album details
The Ultimate Collection	Released: September 13, 2005; Label: R2 Entertainment; Formats: 3xDVD

== Singles ==
Name	Year	Peak chart positions										Certifications	Album
Name	Year	US	US AC	AUS	CAN	CAN AC	GER	IRE	NL	NZ	UK	Certifications	Album
As Dawn
"Candida"	1970	3	8	9	2	11	18	—	—	2	9	RIAA: Gold	Candida
"Knock Three Times"	1970	1	2	1	1	4	2	3	3	1	1	RIAA: Gold	Candida
"I Play and Sing"	1971	25	15	60	16	25	40	—	—	10	—		Dawn Featuring Tony Orlando
"Summer Sand"	1971	33	9	86	21	8	—	—	—	—	—		Dawn Featuring Tony Orlando
As Dawn featuring Tony Orlando
"What Are You Doing Sunday"	1971	39	23	52	19	—	—	1	—	15	3		Dawn Featuring Tony Orlando
"Juanita (I Didn't Mean to Love You So Good)" (Germany-only release)	1971	—	—	—	—	—	44	—	—	—	—		Dawn Featuring Tony Orlando
"Runaway/Happy Together"	1972	79	—	—	44	—	—	—	—	—	—		Tuneweaving
"Vaya con Dios"	1972	95	37	—	—	—	—	—	—	—			Non-album single
"You're a Lady"	1972	70	—	—	68	—	—	—	—	—	—		Tuneweaving
"Tie a Yellow Ribbon Round the Ole Oak Tree"	1973	1	1	1	1	1	9	1	1	1	1	RIAA: Gold	Tuneweaving
"Say, Has Anybody Seen My Sweet Gypsy Rose"	1973	3	1	2	4	2	37	8	11	—	12	RIAA: Gold	Dawn's New Ragtime Follies
As Tony Orlando and Dawn
"Who's in the Strawberry Patch with Sally"	1973	27	3	15	19	1	—	—	— (Note: "Who's in the Strawberry Patch with Sally" did not enter the Dutch Single Top 100, but did peak at number 26 on the Dutch Top 40.)	6	37		Dawn's New Ragtime Follies
"It Only Hurts When I Try to Smile"	1974	81	36	—	59	15	—	—	—	—	—		Non-album single
"Steppin' Out (Gonna Boogie Tonight)"	1974	7	4	—	13	2	—	—	—	—	—		Dawn's New Ragtime Follies
"Look in My Eyes Pretty Woman"	1974	11	6	—	19	10	—	—	—	—	—		Prime Time
"Little Heads In Bunkbeds"	1975	—	—	—	—	—	—	—	—	—	—		Prime Time
"He Don't Love You (Like I Love You)"	1975	1	1	33	4	3	—	—	—	28	—	RIAA: Gold	He Don't Love You (Like I Love You)
"Mornin' Beautiful"	1975	14	2	94	29	5	—	—	—	—	—		He Don't Love You (Like I Love You)
"You're All I Need to Get By"	1975	34	13	—	55	22	—	—	—	—	—		To Be with You
"Skybird"	1975	49	7	—	64	16	—	—	—	—	—		Skybird
"Cupid"	1976	22	2	99	27	5	—	—	—	22	—		To Be with You
"Midnight Love Affair"	1976	— (Note: "Midnight Love Affair" didn't enter the Billboard Hot 100, but did peak at number 93 on the Cash Box Singles Chart.)	15	—	77	15	—	—	—	—	—		To Be with You
"Spanish Harlem, Rosita and Me" (promo-only release)	1976	—	—	—	—	—	—	—	—	—	—		Non-album singles
"Sing"	1977	58	7	—	52	5	—	—	—	—	—		Non-album singles
"You're All I Need to Get By"	1977	—	—	—	—	—	—	—	—	—	—		Non-album singles
"With Ev'ry Yellow Ribbon (That's Why We Tie 'Em)"	1991	—	—	—	—	—	—	—	—	—	—		Non-album singles
"—" denotes releases that did not chart or were not released in that territory.
