= Tony Orlando and Dawn (TV series) =

- Also known as: The Tony Orlando and Dawn Rainbow Hour
- Genre: Comedy-variety
- Written by: Hal Goldman; Al Gordon; Saul Ilson; Arthur Sellers; Ernest Chambers; Jerry Jackson; Elaine Laron
- Directed by: Jeff Margolis
- Starring: Tony Orlando; Telma Hopkins; Joyce Vincent Wilson
- Opening theme: "Tie a Yellow Ribbon 'Round the Ole Oak Tree"
- Ending theme: "Tie a Yellow Ribbon 'Round the Ole Oak Tree"
- Composer: Bob Rozario
- Country of origin: United States
- Original language: English
- No. of seasons: 3
- No. of episodes: 44

Production
- Producers: Saul Ilson; Ernest Chambers
- Production locations: CBS Television City; Fairfax District, Los Angeles, California
- Editor: Marco Zappia
- Camera setup: Multi-camera
- Running time: 54 minutes

Original release
- Network: CBS
- Release: July 3, 1974 – December 1976

Tony Orlando and Dawn is a television variety show that aired from 1974 to 1976 on CBS. The show featured the American pop music group Tony Orlando and Dawn. The show was titled The Tony Orlando and Dawn Rainbow Hour during the 1976–1977 television season.

== Early history ==
Tony Orlando was born Michael Anthony Orlando Cassavitis on April 3, 1944. After almost a decade of singing and with only three Top 40 hits, two in 1961 and another in 1969 as the lead singer for the studio group Wind, he had not had any further successes. He stopped singing entirely, and by 1970 he was a retired demo singer. He began publishing music for April-Blackwood Music, a division of Columbia Records, instead.

Then Orlando received "Candida", a song that other producers and singers had turned down. Orlando was not able to originally lend his name to the song, as he was working for April-Blackwood, and recording under his own name would be a professional conflict of interest. After an insistence by producer Hank Medress that he dub his voice over the male vocals on the original track, the single was released on Bell Records as being performed by the band "Dawn", to protect his position.

The background singers on the track were Sharon Greane, Linda November, Jay Siegel, and Toni Wine, who co-wrote the song. Phil Margo played drums on the original session, and the arranger was Norman Bergen. After the single hit No. 3 on the Billboard Hot 100 (#1 on the Cashbox Top 100), Orlando wanted to start performing again. The ensemble then recorded the follow-up song "Knock Three Times", which topped the Hot 100 from the week ending January 23, 1971, to the week ending February 6, 1971.

Bell Records was desperate to have a real-life act to promote Dawn's records. Orlando asked former Motown/Stax backing vocalists Telma Hopkins and Joyce Vincent Wilson to become Dawn. The threesome then went on the road after "Candida" and "Knock Three Times". After a tour of Europe, Hopkins and Vincent assumed background vocal duties in the studio as well. They were joined in the studio by Vincent's sister Pamela Vincent, who in addition to singing, arranged all the backing vocals. Prior touring commitments with Aretha Franklin prevented Vincent from appearing with Dawn on tour. The first single with their voices in the background was "Runaway/Happy Together" in 1972.

The group (now billed as 'Dawn featuring Tony Orlando') released another single in 1973, and it almost immediately became their next No. 1 single — "Tie a Yellow Ribbon 'Round the Ole Oak Tree." In terms of sales, this single was the most successful in the group's career, starting a string of seven consecutive Hot 100 appearances with long titles by the group. The group's next single, "Say, Has Anybody Seen My Sweet Gypsy Rose" (from their concept album Dawn's New Ragtime Follies), went to No. 3 on the Hot 100, followed by similarly flavored top 40 hits "Who's In The Strawberry Patch With Sally" (the first single with recording credit "Tony Orlando & Dawn") (#27), "Steppin' Out (Gonna Boogie Tonight)" (#7), and, with some disco influence, "Look in My Eyes Pretty Woman" (#11), from their 1974 album Prime Time.

== History ==
CBS gave the group a television variety show (entitled Tony Orlando and Dawn) from the summer of 1974, after The Sonny & Cher Comedy Hour ended its run, until December 1976. The show was in the same vein as its predecessor (with sketches featuring sarcastic back-and-forth banter between Orlando, Hopkins and Vincent, similar to the sarcastic dialogue between Sonny and Cher) and became a Top 20 hit.

With a new record label (Elektra), the group continued their string of hit singles during the show's run, hitting the Top 10 on the Hot 100 and/or adult contemporary charts, including "He Don't Love You (Like I Love You)" (a reworking of Jerry Butler's "He Will Break Your Heart") (#1) and "Mornin' Beautiful" (#14). In 1975 a remake of the Sam Cooke song "Cupid" became the group's last Top 40 single on the Hot 100. "Sing" reached No. 7 on the Adult Contemporary Chart in 1977. The group went their separate ways later that year and would have only one more single, 1991's "With Ev'ry Yellow Ribbon (That's Why We Tie 'Em)".

On The Carol Burnett Show, Harvey Korman, Carol Burnett and Vicki Lawrence did a spoof of Tony Orlando and Dawn; at the end of the skit, the song was finished by the real Tony Orlando and Dawn.

== See also ==
- 1974–75 United States network television schedule
- 1975–76 United States network television schedule
- 1976–77 United States network television schedule
