= Dawn's New Ragtime Follies =

Studio album by Tony Orlando and Dawn
- Released: 1973
- Recorded: 1972–1973
- Studios: Century Sound, New York City; Mediasound, New York City
- Genres: Ragtime; vaudeville; rock; show tunes
- Length: 30:30
- Label: Bell
- Producers: Hank Medress; Dave Appell

Tony Orlando and Dawn chronology
Tuneweaving (1973)	Dawn's New Ragtime Follies (1973)	Prime Time (1974)

Singles from Dawn's New Ragtime Follies
- 1. "Say, Has Anybody Seen My Sweet Gypsy Rose" Released: July 1973; 2. "Who's in the Strawberry Patch with Sally" Released: November 1973; 3. "Steppin' Out (Gonna Boogie Tonight)" Released: August 1974; 4. "You Say the Sweetest Things" Released: December 1974

Professional ratings
Review scores
Source	Rating
Allmusic	3.5/5 stars
Encyclopedia of Popular Music	2/5 stars

Dawn's New Ragtime Follies is a 1973 album by the American pop group Tony Orlando and Dawn. This release was a concept album that combined Vaudevillian ragtime flavors with pop and disco music. With multi-generational appeal, and aided by Tony Orlando & Dawn's highly successful weekly TV variety show on CBS, Dawn's New Ragtime Follies sold millions and became Tony Orlando & Dawn’s best selling LP. New Ragtime Follies spawned the best-selling singles "Say, Has Anybody Seen My Sweet Gypsy Rose," "Who’s in the Strawberry Patch With Sally" and "Steppin' Out (Gonna Boogie Tonight)." Telma Hopkins is featured on lead vocals for a cover of John Sebastian's "Daydream", which was a hit for the Lovin' Spoonful in 1966. A later compact disc reissue of the album contains four bonus tracks, "Jolie", "Personality", Come Back Billie Jo", and a slightly varied single version of "Steppin’ Out."

== Track listing ==
1. "Overture" 3:08
2. "Steppin' Out (Gonna Boogie Tonight)" (Irwin Levine, L. Russell Brown) 2:54
3. "Say, Has Anybody Seen My Sweet Gypsy Rose" (Levine, Brown) 2:51
4. "If It Wasn't for You Dear" (Levine, Brown) 3:40
5. "Sweet Summer Days of My Life" (Dave Appell, Sandy Linzer) 3:09
6. "Who's in the Strawberry Patch with Sally?" (Levine, Brown) 2:23
7. "Daydream" (John Sebastian) 3:02
8. "Atlanta" (Eddie Rabin) 2:59
9. "Ukulele Man" (Appell, Linzer, Hank Medress) 3:05
10. "You Say the Sweetest Things" (Appell, Linzer) 3:30
11. "Reprise (Strawberry Patch)" (1:09)

== Personnel ==
- Tony Orlando – lead vocals
- Telma Hopkins, Joyce Vincent – backing vocals
- Allan Schwartzberg – drums
- Julie Medress, Mike Mainieri – percussion, vibraphone
- Stu Woods – bass
- Frank Owens, Jon Stroll, Joel Mofsenson, Warren Bernhardt – keyboards
- Bob Mann, Dave Appell, Jerry Friedman – guitars, ukulele

== Charts ==
Chart (1974)	Peak position
Australian (Kent Music Report)	27

== Production ==
- Produced and mixed by Hank Medress and Dave Appell, with mixing engineered by Bob Radice
- Recording by Bob Radice
- Recorded at Century Sound Studio and Mediasound in New York City
