= Who's in the Strawberry Patch with Sally =

1973 single by Dawn featuring Tony Orlando

"Who’s in the Strawberry Patch With Sally"

Single by Dawn featuring Tony Orlando

from the album Dawn's New Ragtime Follies
- B-side: "Ukelele Man"
- Released: 1973
- Genre: Pop
- Length: 2:23
- Label: Bell Records
- Songwriters: Irwin Levine and L. Russell Brown
- Producers: Hank Medress, Dave Appell

Dawn featuring Tony Orlando singles chronology
""Say, Has Anybody Seen My Sweet Gypsy Rose”" (1973)	"Who’s in the Strawberry Patch With Sally" (1973)	""It Only Hurts When I Try to Smile"" (1974)

"Who's in the Strawberry Patch With Sally" is a song written by Irwin Levine and L. Russell Brown. Recorded by Tony Orlando and Dawn, the 1973 single release was an international hit, peaking at No. 3 on the Billboard Adult Contemporary chart. It also hit No. 1 in Canada, No. 6 in New Zealand, and No. 36 in the United Kingdom.
