= You're the Best Thing That Ever Happened to Me (Dean Martin album) =

Studio album by Dean Martin
- Released: December 14, 1973
- Recorded: 1973
- Genre: Country
- Length: 28:30
- Label: Reprise – R/RS 6428
- Producer: Jimmy Bowen

Dean Martin chronology
Sittin' on Top of the World (1972)	You're the Best Thing That Ever Happened to Me (1973)	Once in a While (1978)

You're the Best Thing That Ever Happened to Me is the thirty-second studio album by Dean Martin, arranged by Ernie Freeman and Larry Muhoberac, and produced by Jimmy Bowen.

Bowen returned to the country format that he had abandoned for Martin's previous album, and included Traditional pop standards, R&B songs, and an Italian song. Four of the songs, "I'm Confessin' (That I Love You)", "Baby Won't You Please Come Home," "I Don't Know Why," and "Gimme a Little Kiss, Will Ya, Huh?", had previously appeared on his 1964 album Dream with Dean.

It was reissued on CD by Hip-O Records in 2009.

== Reception ==
Professional ratings
Review scores
Source	Rating
Allmusic	2.5/5 stars

William Ruhlmann on Allmusic.com gave the album two and a half stars out of five. Ruhlmann said that "The idea, it seemed, was to try a little everything, and Martin, as usual, was game. But he really needed to have displayed such versatility earlier".

== Track listing ==
1. "Free to Carry On" (Burton Dale Bobbitt, Jim Brady) – 2:42
2. "You're the Best Thing That Ever Happened to Me" (Jim Weatherly) – 4:00
3. "I'm Confessin' (That I Love You)" (Doc Daugherty, Al J. Neiburg, Ellis Reynolds) – 3:08
4. "Amor Mio" (Sammy Cahn) – 2:43
5. "You Better Move On" (Arthur Alexander) – 2:23
6. "Tie a Yellow Ribbon Round the Old Oak Tree" (L. Russell Brown, Irwin Levine) – 2:47
7. "Baby Won't You Please Come Home" (Charles Warfield, Clarence Williams) – 2:28
8. "I Don't Know Why" (Fred E. Ahlert, Roy Turk) – 2:53
9. "Gimme a Little Kiss, Will Ya, Huh?" (Maceo Pinkard, Jack Smith, Roy Turk) – 2:38
10. "Get On with Your Livin'" (Ted Hamilton) – 2:48

== Personnel ==
- Dean Martin – vocals
- Ernie Freeman – arranger
- Larry Muhoberac
- Jimmy Bowen – record producer
- John Guess – audio engineer
- Tom Perry
- Ricci Martin – photography
