= Steppin' Out (Gonna Boogie Tonight) =

Song by Irwin Levine and L. Russell Brown

Single by Dawn featuring Tony Orlando

from the album Dawn's New Ragtime Follies
- B-side: "She Can't Hold a Candle to You"
- Released: 1974
- Genre: Pop
- Length: 2:51
- Label: Bell Records
- Songwriter(s): Irwin Levine; L. Russell Brown
- Producer(s): Hank Medress; Dave Appell

Dawn featuring Tony Orlando singles chronology
"It Only Hurts When I Try to Smile" (1974)	"Steppin' Out (Gonna Boogie Tonight)" (1974)	"Look in My Eyes Pretty Woman" (1974)

“Steppin' Out (Gonna Boogie Tonight)” is a 1974 song by the American pop music group Tony Orlando and Dawn. It was written by Irwin Levine and L. Russell Brown and was included on the group's 1973 album, Dawn's New Ragtime Follies.

== Chart performance ==
Chart (1974)	Peak position
US Billboard Hot 100	7
US Adult Contemporary (Billboard)	4
