= Frank Owens (musician) =

American pianist and composer (1933–2023)

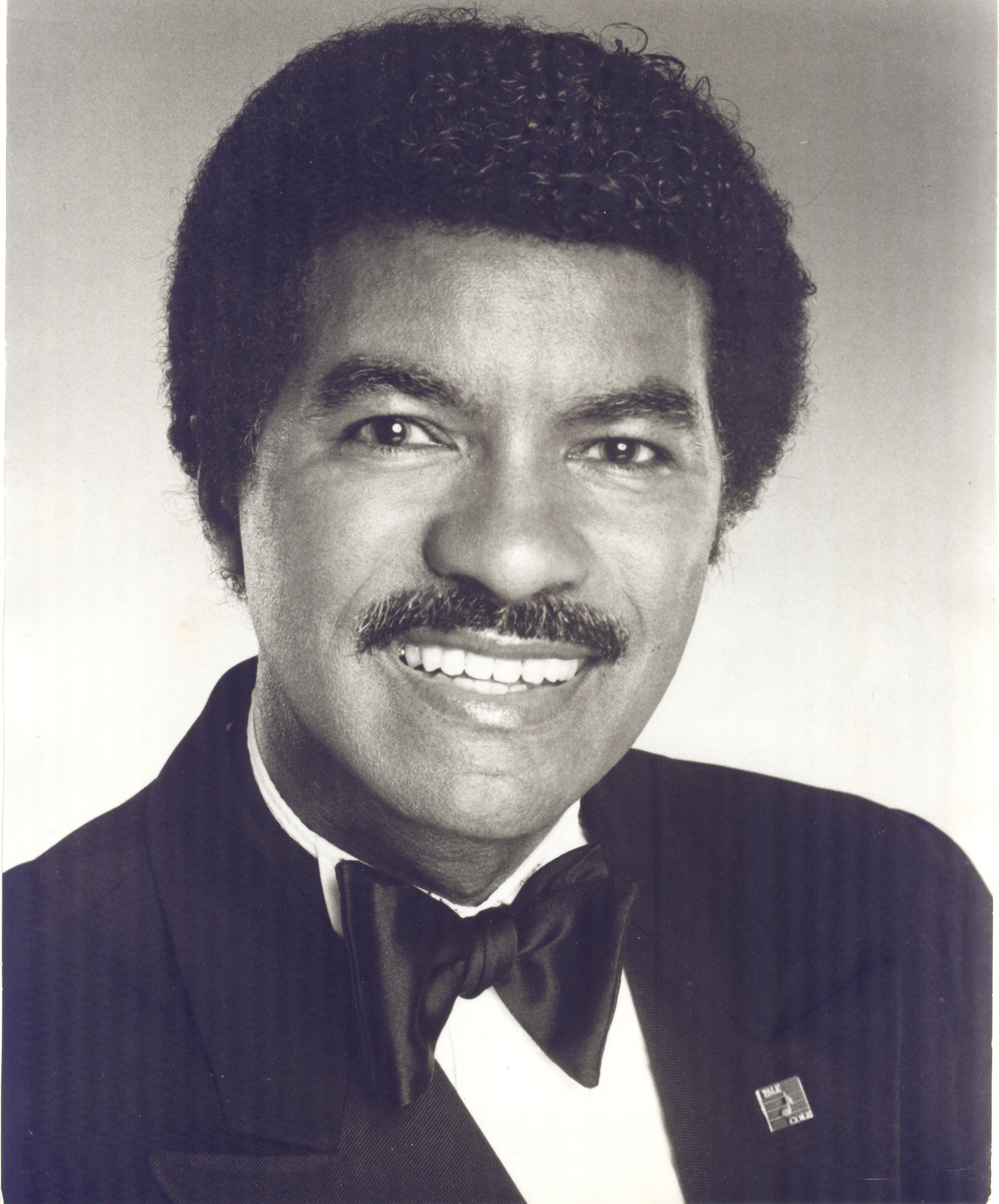

Background information
- Born: September 1, 1933; Harlem, New York, U.S.
- Origin: New York, New York
- Died: September 15, 2023 (aged 90) Washington, D.C.
- Genres: Classical; Jazz; Traditional Pop; R&B; Latin
- Occupation: Pianist • Arranger • Composer • Conductor
- Instrument: Piano • Keyboards • Harpsicord • Organ
- Years active: 1953–2023
- Label: Columbia • Encounter

Frank Owens (September 1, 1933 – September 15, 2023) was a multi-genre American pianist, arranger, composer, and conductor who found accolades on Broadway, in recording studios, and a host of stages large and small around the globe. While noted as a behind-the-scenes player, the classically-trained Owens drove and distilled the musical voice for performers ranging from folk and country to jazz and blues to pop and R&B music. As an accompanist, he helped guide the artistic expression of vocalists as well as tap, jazz, and ballet dancers.

== Early life and education ==
Born in Poughkeepsie, N.Y. in 1933 and orphaned at 3-months old, Owens fell into foster care, placed with New York Foundling. He was raised by a woman who lived on 129th Street in Harlem and performed domestic service.

Owens enjoyed listening to the radio as a toddler and by age 5, had learned to play the songs he heard on the piano. His foster mother was so taken by his skill that she brought him to the home of one of her clients, Patricia "Patty" Boyd Wilson, a pianist and musical educator, so she could assess his talent. As a 10-year-old, he performed Bach's "Jesu Joy of Man's Desiring" in the Myra Hess arrangement for Boyd Wilson. She agreed that Owens was indeed gifted and began to tutor him. His foster mother used her salary to pay for his official piano lessons. He did not abandon his propensity to play by ear, though. When Boyd Wilson took the youngster to the opera for the first time, Owens listened intently, innately memorizing the scores of both Mascagni's Cavalleria rusticana and Leoncavallo's Pagliacci so he could play them later. Even after his foster mother died, Boyd Wilson continued his piano lessons. Despite her moves to Connecticut, Boston, Maine, and finally Mobile, Ala., she remained in touch with Owens.

He went on to attend New York's High School of Music and Art, studying piano and violin. Owens later studied theory and conducting at the New York College of Music.

== Career ==
=== Early years ===
Owens earned money packing flowers for a large millinery supplier and continued to explore his musical potential. Winning consecutive weeks at The Apollo Theater's Amateur Night buoyed confidence in his musical career, as did transitioning to a paid employee at the famed Harlem music hall. While working as an accompanist for amateur contestants at the Apollo, Johnny Mathis scouted Owens and invited him to join his team on the road as his musical director. Owens took the gig, though he later admitted, "I was so green . . . I didn't know the first thing about a downbeat, or how to give a cut-off." Mathis arranged conducting lessons for Owens so he could better command an orchestra, which proved valuable during a Mathis stint in Las Vegas in the late 1950s, and an indelible asset for the rest of Owens' career.

After working with Mathis, he teamed up and accompanied another ex-Apollo Amateur, Barbara McNair. But one of his most enduring partnerships began in 1965 with Petula Clark, whom he met when she landed in New York to play the Copacabana after a European concert tour. Seeking new "Americanized" arrangements for her songs, she connected with Owens through a mutual friend, Claus Ogermann. "I asked him if he knew one of my songs," Clark recounted. "He did, and when he played it, it was as if a whole orchestra was playing." He went on to serve as Clark's principal conductor and arranger for a decade. It was a musical partnership rivaled in longevity only by his relationship with singer Freda Payne. Since the 1970s, he frequently accompanied and provided musical direction for her.

==== Session work ====
Operating chiefly from New York, beginning in the late 1960s through the mid-2000s, Owens built a career and reputation as a master studio musician, working with a range of artists and genres. He amassed more than 260 performing, arranging, writing, conducting, and production credits for his work with luminaries such as Bob Dylan, Louis Armstrong, Shirley Bassey, John Denver, B.B. King, Lena Horne, Ruth Brown, Billy Joel, Astrud Gilberto, Ashford & Simpson, Irene Cara, Country Joe McDonald, Dusty Springfield, Mary Travers, and Jackie Gleason, among others. The rhythm concept Owens designed as keyboardist for Tony Orlando & Dawn's "Tie a Yellow Ribbon 'Round the Ole Oak Tree" helped land the song on Billboard's Hot 100 chart in 1973 for an 11-week run. propelling the album, Tuneweaving, to gold-record certification.

==== Film and television ====
Owens developed the dance arrangements for 1978's The Wiz. Two years later, he joined the nascent NBC-TV morning program, The David Letterman Show, as musical director, writing the show's cues.

As an accompanist, he made frequent appearances through the years on programs such as The Tonight Show Starring Johnny Carson, The Merv Griffin Show, The Mike Douglas Show, Tonight Starring Jack Parr, The Andy Williams Show, and The Dean Martin Show. He resumed this position at the piano in 1983 during PBS-TV specials with John Williams and the Boston Pops, backing the tap dancing of Gregory Hines and as lead pianist for the Kennedy Center Tonight special, Eubie Blake: A Century of Music.

Owens became a more familiar face for generations of viewers as the inaugural musical director for the television series, It's Showtime at the Apollo.

==== Broadway ====
Owens brought his skills to the Great White Way for several notable projects, leading with Ain't Misbehavin', where from May 1978 to January 1979, he was the pianist for the Longacre Theatre production. The scope of his Broadway roles increased by 1980, when Owens provided musical direction for Black Broadway, a tribute review to the artistry of Eubie Blake, Duke Ellington, James Weldon Johnson, Fats Waller and others. He deepened that imprint further with Sophisticated Ladies, where from March 1981 to January 1983 he served as both pianist and assistant conductor at the Lunt-Fontanne Theatre. The production marked the award-winning Broadway debut for R&B singer Phyllis Hyman and evolved into a tour, with stops at the Kennedy Center and in Moscow, where Owens continued in his dual roles. In 1986, he provided the dance arrangements, musical direction, musical supervision, featured songs, and piano playing for Maurice Hines' Uptown . . . It's Hot! The production earned Hines a 1986 Tony nomination for Best Actor in a Musical.

Off Broadway, Owens dabbled in acting as well, playing Lawrence Brown in the TheatreWorks Hartford production of Paul Robeson.

==== Club circuit and performances ====
Owens remained a familiar fixture at cabaret sets and on going-out guides in publications across New York City and elsewhere for decades. For six years, he was a resident pianist at Mortimer's, the swanky Manhattan café that catered to the rich, famous, and infamous. He held a similar role at the York River Club and the Carlyle Hotel's Bemelmans Bar for several seasons, among other gigs. Similarly, vocalists spanning from Tamiko Jones to Freda Payne called upon and collaborated with Owens for decades during their New York area residencies.

In his concerts, Owens often focused on homages to swing and stride maestros he admired. At the Village Gate, Owens directed the musical revue, Shades of Harlem in 1986 He also originated and served as musical director for Street Heat at Studio 54. Later that year, he brought his Basically Blake – an Evening of Eubie Blake's Music to the Universal Jazz Coalition, along with vocalist Jeree Palmer. From 1995 onward, he and his eponymous trio were hallmark performers at Tap Extravaganza events in and around New York City, where legion of aficionados gather annually in recognition of National Tap Dance Day, the commemoration authorized by the U.S. Congress in 1989 in observance of Bill "Bojangles" Robinson's birthday, May 25. In 1999, Owens was tapped to lead the big band that helped celebrate the star-studded 125th birthday of W.C. Handy at New York's Alice Tully Hall. He delivered similar notes as one of the featured artists in Manhattan's Bryant Park "Piano in the Park" 2008 series, among other such engagements.

Throughout his career, Owens proved to be sympathetic to and encouraging of emerging talent, frequently making room on his schedule to play a supportive role. For instance, he was a longtime host and player for the open mic events jazz patron Nobuko "Cobi" Narita presented weekly at Cobi's Place, a one-time Midtown Manhattan music and tap dance haunt. He brought similar empathy whenever he picked up the baton as a guest conductor for the American Jazz Orchestra at Cooper Union, the Yale Symphony Orchestra, or during visits to Mobile College, where he offered master classes.

==== Apollo Theater affiliation ====
Owens' relationship with the Apollo Theater began in the early 1950s when he stepped onto the vaunted Harlem stage as an Amateur Night contestant, the same stage that since 1934 has served as a launchpad for performers ranging from Ella Fitzgerald and Billie Holiday to The Isley Brothers and The Jackson 5 to D'Angelo and H.E.R. Owens won the contest consecutively for two nights, but "forgot that most audiences go for what is familiar to them and, wanting to vary my offering each week, I played something I loved and the audience didn't know from a hole in the wall." Hence, his rendition of "Why Do I Love You?" from Show Boat tanked his Apollo run, despite playing the song in the style of his musical hero, Erroll Garner.

That early error in judgement did not sever his connection to the Apollo, however. The Schiffman brothers who owned the theater opted to hire Owens to accompany Amateur Night contestants, rather than continue to contend with his "friendly advice" and note corrections during run-throughs. That decision came with its own challenges, they soon discovered. "Frankie was good. He was damn good. And after a while he became too good . . . he made even the lousy amateurs sound good, and we were having trouble getting losers and losers are part of the show. We didn't put losers in on purpose, but on average there would be at least a couple in each show – until Frankie came along," Bobby Schiffman once said.

Decades later, Owens returned to the Apollo as a pianist for 1985's televised event, Motown Returns to the Apollo – a 50th Anniversary Special. When Showtime at the Apollo launched in syndication in 1987, he took his place in the pit anew, writing the musical cues and serving as the program's musical director until 1994.

== Career achievements ==
=== Recordings ===
Beyond session work, Owens also recorded his own albums. Oliver! Ole! is a 9-track Latin Soul rendition of tunes from the musical Oliver! he released on Columbia Records. While produced by Jimmy Wisner, Owens arranged and conducted the 1969 release, as well as performed on piano, organ, and harpsichord.

He followed that album with 1973's Brown 'n' Serve, and added to his personal discography decades later with 2019's Frank Owens Plays the Music of Eddie Heywood and 2021's Frank Owens: In Performance.

=== Honors and awards ===
In 2002, the New York Committee to Celebrate National Tap Dance Day presented Owens with the Flo-Bert Achievement Award for his musical contributions to and in support of the craft.

He was a member of the International Art of Jazz board of directors and a longtime governor with the National Academy of Recording Arts and Sciences (NARAS), New York chapter. The chapter honored Owens with its NARAS Most Valuable Player Award for acoustic piano for four consecutive years, five years overall. As such, Owens also was the recipient of the chapter's NARAS Virtuoso Award, also for acoustic piano.

== Personal life ==
Owens spent most of his life as a resident of New York City, living first in Harlem, and later in the Jackson Heights section of Queens. He eventually fulfilled a lifelong ambition to reside in Washington, D.C, purchasing a home within walking distance of Howard University.

=== Later years ===
As he grew older, Owens drifted back to his first love – classical music – and accepted the role of accompanist for the Washington School of Ballet and the Maryland Youth Ballet. Along with those dancers, he continued to nurture other younger talent, such as jazz vocalists Christine Melton and Chad Carter. He also refocused on composing and recording his own music. During the COVID-19 pandemic, Owens performed and live streamed intimate concerts from his D.C. home, often alongside his longtime professional and domestic partner of nearly 30 years, dancer and choreographer D. Mickey Davidson.

=== Death ===
En route to play for a class at the Washington Ballet, Owens suffered a medical incident and lost control of his car on September 14, 2023. He sustained multiple injuries in the ensuing crash and later died in the hospital on September 15, 2023. He is interred at Woodlawn Cemetery in the Bronx, N.Y.

== Sources ==
Allmusic.com. "Frank Owens – Credits." Accessed January 5, 2026.

Anderson, Jack, "A Panorama of Styles, Past and Present," The New York Times, June 4, 2004.

Anderson, Jack, "Tappers Celebrate Their Day With Awards," E5, The New York Times, May 29, 2001.

Anderson, Jack, "A Family Reunion for Tap on Its Day," C15, The New York Times, May 27, 1997.

ASCAP.com, "Frank Owens – Writer." Accessed January 20, 2026.

ASCAP.com, "Frank Owens – Writer." Accessed January 21, 2026.

Cameron, Christopher, "Photos Reveal What It Was Really Like Inside Mortimer's, NYC's Most Exclusive Celeb Club," New York Post, March 2, 2022.

Daniels, Karu F. "'Band of Gold' Singer Freda Payne on Returning to Her Jazz Roots, Dishing Dirt about Her Past Love Life in Juicy New Memoir," New York Daily News, November 21, 2021.

Fast, Cammie, "Owens Found His Keys to Success – All 88 of 'Em," Mobile Press Register, 9B, February 1, 1987.

Gussow, Mel, "Going Out Guide: Cabaret Nostalgia," C13, The New York Times, August 22, 1984.

Internet Archive. Henry III, William A., The Great One: The Life and Legend of Jackie Gleason. Accessed April 27, 2026.

Instagram. "Today My Heart Is Heavy." Official Freda Payne account.

Instagram. "In Loving Memory of Frank Owens." The Washington School of Ballet account.

Library of Congress. "Frank Owens Trio – American Piano Retrospective." Live concert sponsored by International Art of Jazz, 1990. Accessed January 30, 2026.

Library of Congress. "Frank Owens – Basically Blake." Live concert sponsored by International Art of Jazz, 1990. Accessed January 30, 2026.

McKean, Gil, "Say, Oliver, Your Momma's Calling You, Baby!" Olivier! Olé!, Stereo CS 9774, Columbia Records, 1969.

Metrick, Cheryl, Fantasy & Romance, CD Baby, 2005.

Nemy, Enid, "Broadway," The New York Times, C2, August 17, 1986.

Pareles, Jon, "Handy Made the Blues Live And the Tributes Go On," E29, The New York Times, March 26, 1999.

Rabinowitz, Chole, "Frank Owens, Broadway Musician And Former, Musical Director For SHOWTIME AT THE APOLLO, Passes Away," Broadway World, September 18, 2023.

Routes: A Guide to African-American Culture. https://routes-mag.com/author/mickey/.

Sandomir, Richard, "Cobi Narita Tireless Jazz Promoter and Benefactor, Dies at 97," The New York Times, December 4, 2023.

Shepherd, Richard F., "Going Out Guide: Art, Live and Other - Return," C14, The New York Times, July 20, 1982.

Schiffman, Jack, Harlem Heyday: A Pictorial History of Modern Black Show Business and the Apollo Theatre, pp. 106-107, Prometheus Books, Buffalo, NY, 1984.

Schiffman, Jack, Uptown: The Story of Harlem's Apollo Theatre, pp. 113, 117, Cowles Book Co., New York, 1971.

Shepherd, Richard, F., "Going Out Guide: Jazz," The New York Times, p. 11, June 21, 1986.

Siskel, Gene, "Who's Petula Clark's Number One Quarterback?" Chicago Tribune, November 14, 1969.

Tatum Jr., Gordon, "Career Musician Laments Changes in Music Biz," Mobile Register, 1G and 9G, March 28, 1993.

Tatum Jr., Gordon, "Pianist Wows Mobile College Crowd with Rag, Boogie, and Jazz," Mobile Register, 1B, April 3, 1993.

Van Gelder, Lawrence, "Footlights: Fleet of Foot," E1, The New York Times, May 25, 2000.

Wilson, John S., "Career Resumed by Tamiko Jones," p. 43, The New York Times, January 14, 1971.
