= List of number-one singles of 1973 (Ireland) =

This is a list of singles which have reached number one on the Irish Singles Chart in 1973.

Issue date	Song	Artist	Ref.
4 January	"Happy Xmas (War Is Over)"	John Lennon and Yoko Ono and the Plastic Ono Band with the Harlem Community Choir	
11 January	"Whiskey In The Jar"	Thin Lizzy	
18 January	"Long Haired Lover from Liverpool"	Little Jimmy Osmond	
25 January	"Long Haired Lover from Liverpool"	Little Jimmy Osmond	
1 February	"Long Haired Lover from Liverpool"	Little Jimmy Osmond	
8 February	"Long Haired Lover from Liverpool"	Little Jimmy Osmond	
15 February	"Block Buster!"	Sweet	
22 February	"Block Buster!"	Sweet	
1 March	"I Love You Still"	Big Tom	
8 March	"I Love You Still"	Big Tom	
15 March	"Cum On Feel the Noize"	Slade	
22 March	"Cum On Feel the Noize"	Slade	
29 March	"Get Down"	Gilbert O'Sullivan (Note: Two records were listed as number one this week the other being "20th Century Boy")	
5 April	"Get Down"	Gilbert O'Sullivan	
12 April	"Get Down"	Gilbert O'Sullivan	
19 April	"Tie a Yellow Ribbon Round the Ole Oak Tree"	Dawn featuring Tony Orlando	
26 April	"Tie a Yellow Ribbon Round the Ole Oak Tree"	Dawn featuring Tony Orlando	
3 May	"Tie a Yellow Ribbon Round the Ole Oak Tree"	Dawn featuring Tony Orlando	
10 May	"Tie a Yellow Ribbon Round the Ole Oak Tree"	Dawn featuring Tony Orlando	
17 May	"Tie a Yellow Ribbon Round the Ole Oak Tree"	Dawn featuring Tony Orlando	
24 May	"Tie a Yellow Ribbon Round the Ole Oak Tree"	Dawn featuring Tony Orlando	
31 May	"See My Baby Jive"	Wizzard	
7 June	"Daisy a Day"	Danny Doyle	
14 June	"Daisy a Day"	Danny Doyle	
21 June	"Daisy a Day"	Danny Doyle	
28 June	"Rubber Bullets"	10cc	
5 July	"Rubber Bullets"	10cc	
12 July	"Skweeze Me, Pleeze Me"	Slade	
19 July	"Welcome Home"	Peters and Lee	
26 July	"Welcome Home"	Peters and Lee	
2 August	"Welcome Home"	Peters and Lee	
9 August	"Welcome Home"	Peters and Lee	
16 August	"Welcome Home"	Peters and Lee	
23 August	"Where the 3 Counties Meet"	Brendan Shine	
30 August	"Where the 3 Counties Meet"	Brendan Shine	
6 September	"Young Love"	Donny Osmond	
13 September	"Young Love"	Donny Osmond	
20 September	"The Dean and I"	10cc	
27 September	"The Ballroom Blitz"	Sweet	
4 October	"The Ballroom Blitz"	Sweet	
11 October	"The Ballroom Blitz"	Sweet	
18 October	"My Friend Stan"	Slade	
25 October	"My Friend Stan"	Slade	
1 November	"My Friend Stan"	Slade	
8 November	"For The Good Times"	Perry Como	
15 November	"For The Good Times"	Perry Como	
22 November	"Up and Away (The Helicopter Song)"	The Wolfe Tones	
29 November	"Up and Away (The Helicopter Song)"	The Wolfe Tones	
6 December	"Up and Away (The Helicopter Song)"	The Wolfe Tones	
13 December	"Up and Away (The Helicopter Song)"	The Wolfe Tones	
20 December	"Merry Xmas Everybody"	Slade	
27 December	"Merry Xmas Everybody"	Slade	

== See also ==
- 1973 in music
- Irish Singles Chart
- List of artists who reached number one in Ireland
