= Frank Owens =

Frank Owens may refer to:

- Frank Owens Smith (1859–1924), American businessman and politician
- Frank "Yip" Owens (1886–1958), American baseball catcher
- Frank Owens (musician) (1933–2023), American pianist and composer

== See also ==
- Frank Owen (disambiguation page)
- Owen Franks (born 1987), New Zealand rugby player
