= Tie a Yellow Ribbon =

Tie a Yellow Ribbon may refer to:

- Tie a Yellow Ribbon Round the Ole Oak Tree, a song by Tony Orlando and Dawn
- Tie a Yellow Ribbon (album), a 1973 album by Dawn featuring Tony Orlando
- Tie a Yellow Ribbon (film), a 2007 drama film
