= Tie a Yellow Ribbon (album) =

Also known as "Tuneweaving", a 1973 studio album by Dawn featuring Tony Orlando

Tie a Yellow Ribbon / Tuneweaving

Studio album by Dawn featuring Tony Orlando
- Released: 1973
- Genre: Pop
- Label: Bell
- Producer: Hank Medress, Dave Appell & The Tokens

Dawn featuring Tony Orlando chronology
Dawn Featuring Tony Orlando (1971)	Tie a Yellow Ribbon / Tuneweaving (1973)	Dawn's New Ragtime Follies (1973)

US Tuneweaving LP artwork

US Tuneweaving LP rear artwork

Released in 1973 by Bell Records as Tie a Yellow Ribbon in the UK, but elsewhere as Tuneweaving, it is the third album by American popular music group Dawn (Tony Orlando, Telma Hopkins & Joyce Vincent Wilson). In the US, the album debuted the charts on 24 March 1973 and reached a peak position of number 30 on 16 June 1973.

The UK release differs from the US version not only in name but also in cover artwork. The front of the former features the photo of Dawn which actually appears on the rear of the US sleeve. The cross-stitch concept used on the cover of the latter seemingly intended to evoke a notion of "Tuneweaving"

The track Tie a Yellow Ribbon Round the Ole Oak Tree reached number one in both the US and UK. In terms of sales, this single was the most successful in the group's career, starting a string of seven consecutive Hot 100 appearances. Another track, "You're a Lady" by English singer/songwriter Peter Skellern, reached number 70 on the US charts. The group changed their name to "Tony Orlando and Dawn" later in 1973.

In an interview for the Exclaim! website, Simon Robinson author of the book "The Art Of The Bizarre Vinyl Sleeve," cites the Tuneweaving album cover as an example of this genre. "The idea of turning a photo of the trio into an embroidery is quite a good one, but … the end result is terrible! Any sane record label executive … would have swapped it over for the nice photo on the back…" However a review of Tuneweaving in AllMusic concludes that though it has "one of the ugliest sleeves ever concocted" this, their third album, "became Dawn's first gold album, and deservedly so."

== Track listing ==
Side 1

1. "Freedom for the Stallion" (Allen Toussaint) – 3:25
2. "Jolie" (Al Kooper) – 3:17
3. "When We All Sang Along" (Richard Snyder) – 3:26
4. "Runaway/Happy Together" (Del Shannon, Max Crook/Alan Gordon, Gary Bonner) – 3:38
5. "Easy Evil" (Alan O'Day) – 3:27

Side 2

1. "Tie a Yellow Ribbon Round the Ole Oak Tree" (Irwin Levine, L. Russell Brown) – 3:20
2. "You're a Lady" (Peter Skellern) – 4:45
3. "Lazy Susan" (Thomas Bell, Linda Creed) – 2:45
4. "Watch a Clown Break Down" (Dave Appell, Sandy Linzer) – 2:54
5. "I Can't Believe How Much I Love You" (Ardith Polley) – 2:55
6. ”I Don't Know You Anymore” (Sandy Linzer, Stephen Reinhardt) – 3:10

== Musicians ==
- Allan Schwartzberg - drums
- Bob Mann, Jerry Friedman, Dave Appell - guitar
- Stu Woods, Kirk Hamilton - bass
- Frank Owens, Jon Stroll, Mitch Margo - keyboards
- Jimmy Maelen, Hank Medress, George Devons - percussion
- Gene Bianco - harp
- Gilbert Chimes - harmonica
- New York Strings
- New York Horns

== Voices ==
- Tony Orlando – lead vocals
- Telma Louise Hopkins – backing vocals, Lead on "I Don't Know You Anymore"
- Joyce Vincent Wilson – backing vocals, Lead on "Easy Evil"
- Pam Vincent (sister of Joyce) – backing vocals
- Vocal Group Foundation

== Production ==
- Recorded at Century Sound Studio, NYC
- Producers: Hank Medress, Dave Appell & The Tokens
- Engineers: Bill Radice, Tom Coleman
- Mastering: Media Sound, NYC
