= That Old Gang of Mine =

That Old Gang of Mine may refer to:

- "That Old Gang of Mine" (song), a popular barbershop-style song
- "That Old Gang of Mine" (Angel), an episode of the TV series Angel
- "That Old Gang of Mine", an episode of the TV series Lois & Clark: The New Adventures of Superman
