= List of Billboard Easy Listening number ones of 1973 =

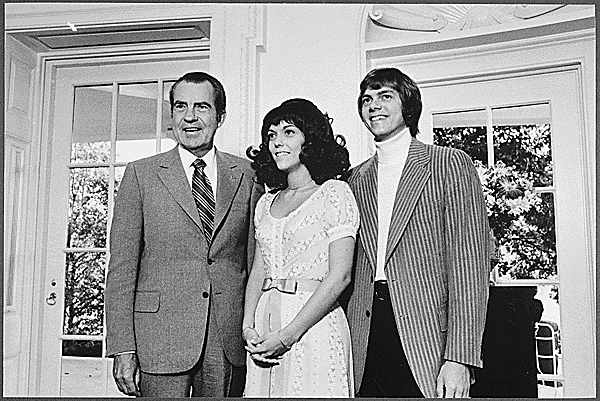
The Carpenters pose with U.S. President Richard Nixon (left) in 1972. The brother-sister duo had two Easy Listening number ones in 1973.

In 1973, Billboard magazine published a chart ranking the top-performing songs in the United States in the easy listening market. The chart, which in 1973 was entitled Easy Listening, has undergone various name changes and has been published under the title Adult Contemporary since 1996. In 1973, 26 songs topped the chart based on playlists submitted by easy listening radio stations and sales reports submitted by stores.

In the issue of Billboard dated January 6, 1973, the band Bread retained the number one position from the final chart of the previous year with "Sweet Surrender", but the song held the top spot for only one further week before being replaced by "Been to Canaan" by Carole King. Helen Reddy had the highest total number of weeks at number one in 1973, spending two weeks in the top spot with "Delta Dawn" and four with "Leave Me Alone (Ruby Red Dress)". The latter song tied with "All I Know" by Art Garfunkel for the year's longest unbroken run at number one. Reddy, the Carpenters, and Tony Orlando and Dawn were the only acts with more than one chart-topper during the year. Among acts to top the Easy Listening chart for the first time in 1973 was the English singer Elton John, who would achieve consistent success on the chart for more than 40 years. By 2016 he held the records for both the greatest number of entries and the largest amount of number ones on the chart, and five years earlier Billboard had named him the most successful act of the listing's first 50 years.

The final number one of the year was "Time in a Bottle" by Jim Croce, which moved into the top spot in the issue of Billboard dated December 30. It was a posthumous chart-topper for the singer, who had died in an airplane crash three months earlier. The song also topped Billboard's pop singles chart, the Hot 100. In the early 1970s there was considerable crossover between the two charts, and seven of 1973's other Easy Listening number ones also reached the top spot on the Hot 100: "You're So Vain" by Carly Simon, "Tie a Yellow Ribbon Round the Ole Oak Tree" by Tony Orlando and Dawn, "My Love" by Paul McCartney and Wings, "Touch Me in the Morning" by Diana Ross, "Delta Dawn" by Reddy, "The Most Beautiful Girl" by Charlie Rich, and "You Are the Sunshine of My Life" by Stevie Wonder. Rich's song also reached number one on the Hot Country Songs chart.

== Chart history ==
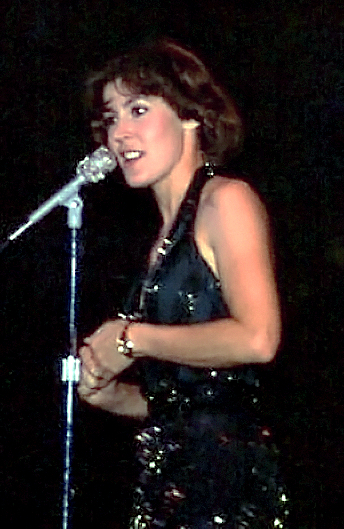
Helen Reddy (pictured in 2006) spent six weeks at number one, the highest total for any act in 1973.

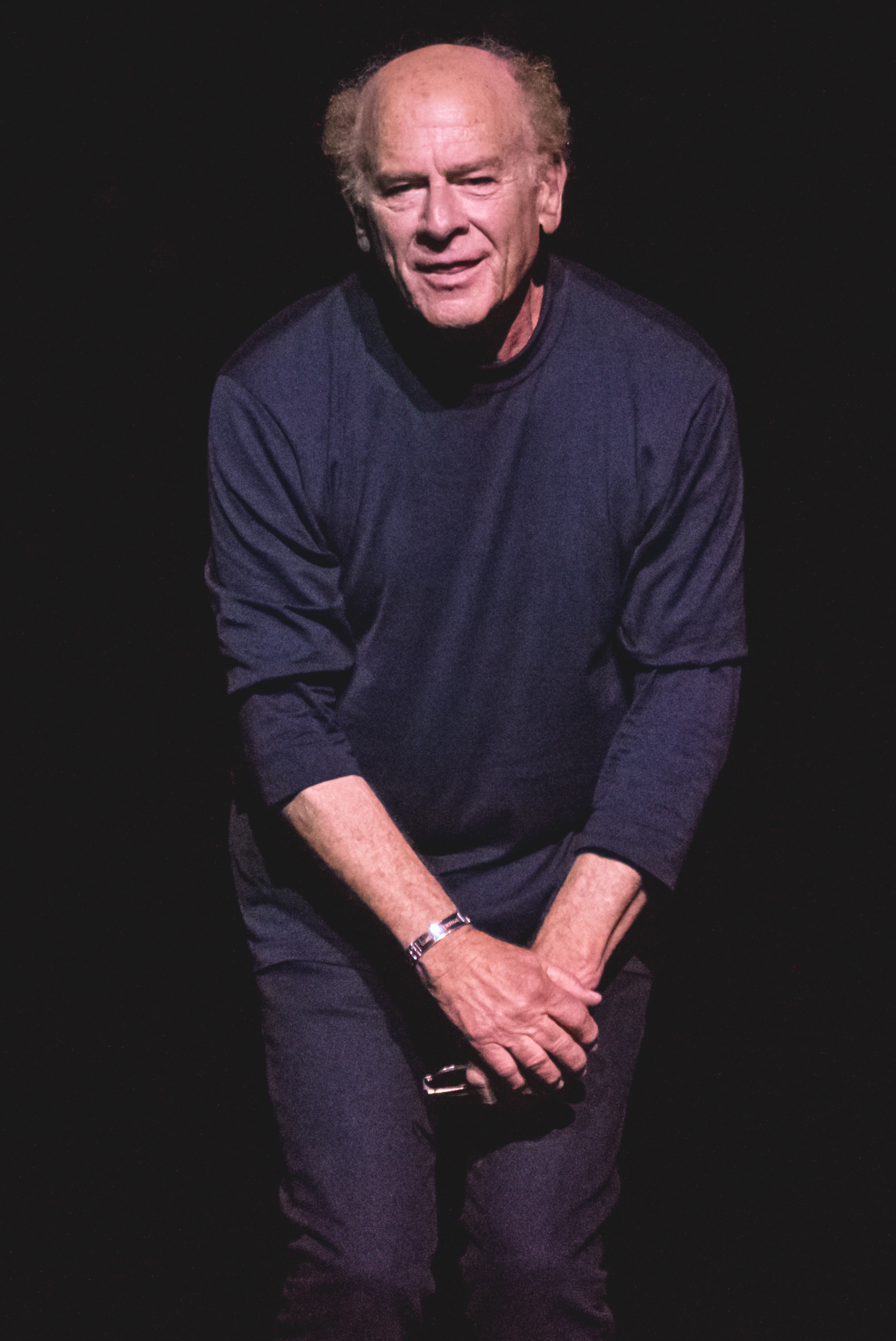
"All I Know" by Art Garfunkel (pictured in 2017) was one of two songs to spend four weeks at number one.

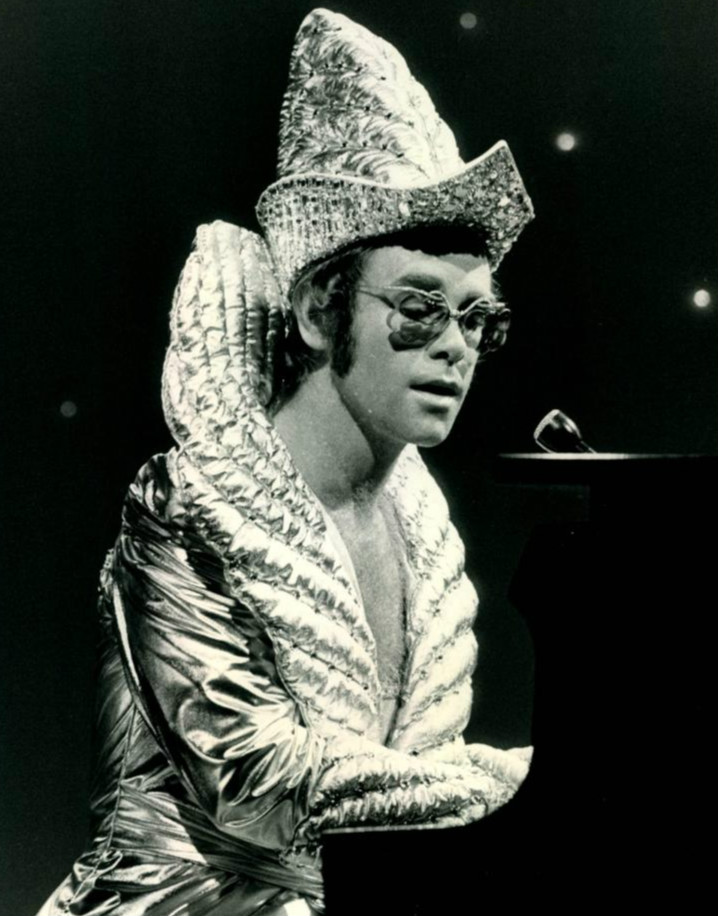
Elton John (pictured in 1975) topped the chart for the first time with "Daniel". He would go on to be named the most successful act of the chart's first 50 years.

Chart history
Issue date	Title	Artist(s)	Ref.
January 6	"Sweet Surrender"	Bread	
January 13	"Been to Canaan"	Carole King	
January 20	"You're So Vain"	Carly Simon	
January 27	"You're So Vain"	Carly Simon	
February 3	"Don't Expect Me to Be Your Friend"	Lobo	
February 10	"Don't Expect Me to Be Your Friend"	Lobo	
February 17	"Dueling Banjos"	Eric Weissberg and Steve Mandell	
February 24	"Dueling Banjos"	Eric Weissberg and Steve Mandell	
March 3	"Last Song"	Edward Bear	
March 10	"Last Song"	Edward Bear	
March 17	"Danny's Song"	Anne Murray	
March 24	"Danny's Song"	Anne Murray	
March 31	"Sing"	The Carpenters	
April 7	"Tie a Yellow Ribbon Round the Ole Oak Tree"	Tony Orlando and Dawn	
April 14	"Sing"	The Carpenters	
April 21	"Tie a Yellow Ribbon Round the Ole Oak Tree"	Tony Orlando and Dawn	
April 28	"You Are the Sunshine of My Life"	Stevie Wonder	
May 5	"You Are the Sunshine of My Life"	Stevie Wonder	
May 12	"Daniel"	Elton John	
May 19	"Daniel"	Elton John	
May 26	"And I Love You So"	Perry Como	
June 2	"My Love"	Paul McCartney and Wings	
June 9	"My Love"	Paul McCartney and Wings	
June 16	"My Love"	Paul McCartney and Wings	
June 23	"Boogie Woogie Bugle Boy"	Bette Midler	
June 30	"Boogie Woogie Bugle Boy"	Bette Midler	
July 7	"Yesterday Once More"	The Carpenters	
July 14	"Yesterday Once More"	The Carpenters	
July 21	"Yesterday Once More"	The Carpenters	
July 28	"Touch Me in the Morning"	Diana Ross	
August 4	"Delta Dawn"	Helen Reddy	
August 11	"Delta Dawn"	Helen Reddy	
August 18	"Say, Has Anybody Seen My Sweet Gypsy Rose"	Tony Orlando and Dawn	
August 25	"Say, Has Anybody Seen My Sweet Gypsy Rose"	Tony Orlando and Dawn	
September 1	"Say, Has Anybody Seen My Sweet Gypsy Rose"	Tony Orlando and Dawn	
September 8	"Loves Me Like a Rock"	Paul Simon	
September 15	"Loves Me Like a Rock"	Paul Simon	
September 22	"My Maria"	B. W. Stevenson	
September 29	"I'm Coming Home"	Johnny Mathis	
October 6	"All I Know"	Art Garfunkel	
October 13	"All I Know"	Art Garfunkel	
October 20	"All I Know"	Art Garfunkel	
October 27	"All I Know"	Art Garfunkel	
November 3	"Paper Roses"	Marie Osmond	
November 10	"The Most Beautiful Girl"	Charlie Rich	
November 17	"The Most Beautiful Girl"	Charlie Rich	
November 24	"The Most Beautiful Girl"	Charlie Rich	
December 1	"Leave Me Alone (Ruby Red Dress)"	Helen Reddy	
December 8	"Leave Me Alone (Ruby Red Dress)"	Helen Reddy	
December 15	"Leave Me Alone (Ruby Red Dress)"	Helen Reddy	
December 22	"Leave Me Alone (Ruby Red Dress)"	Helen Reddy	
December 29	"Time in a Bottle"	Jim Croce	
