= Tony Orlando =

American singer (born 1944)

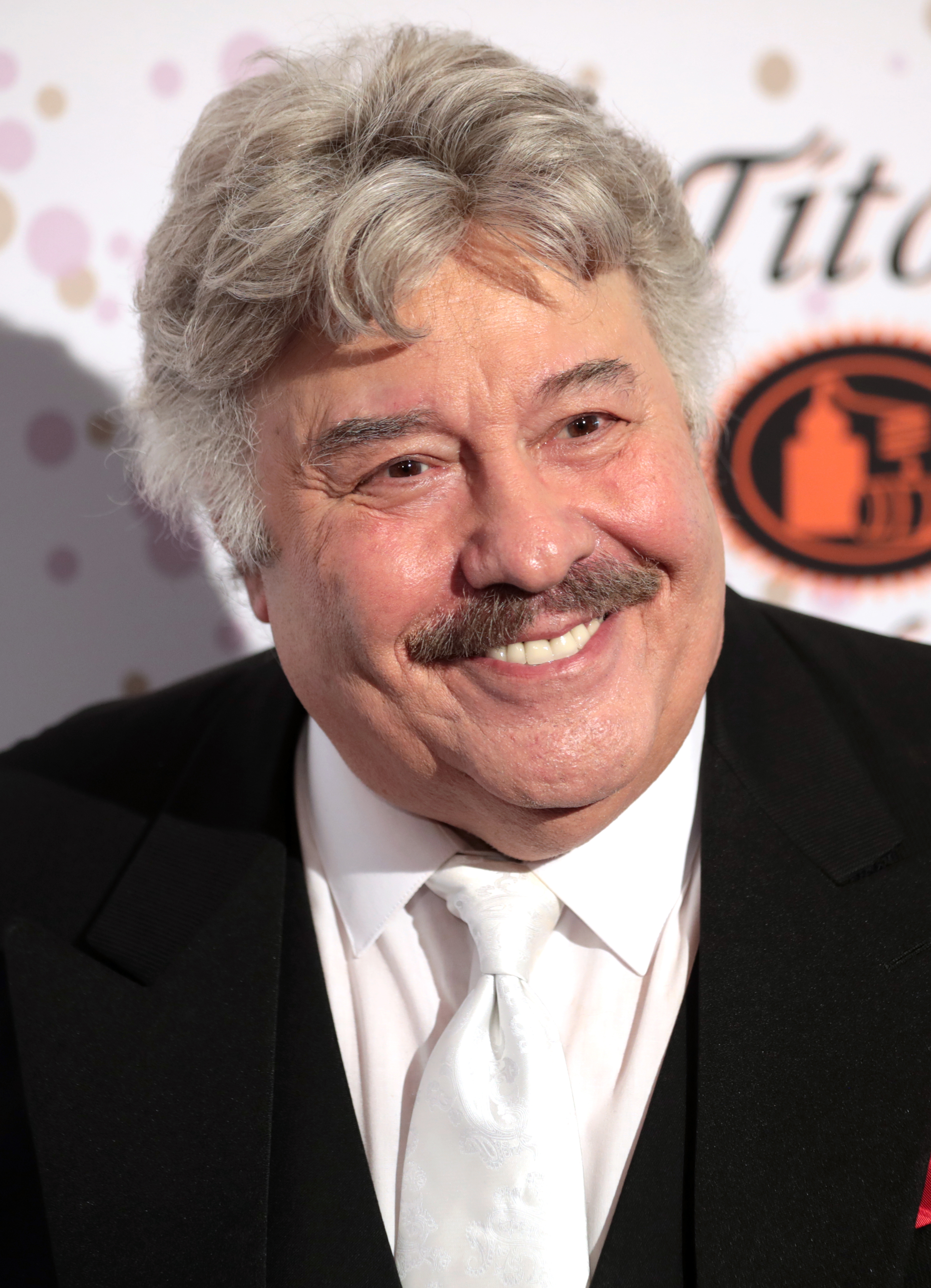
- Orlando in 2022

Background information
- Born: Michael Anthony Orlando Cassavitis; April 3, 1944 (age 82); New York City, U.S.
- Genre: Pop • rock
- Occupations: Singer; songwriter; producer; actor
- Years active: 1958–present
- Website: tonyorlando.com

Michael Anthony Orlando Cassavitis (born April 3, 1944), known professionally as Tony Orlando, is an American pop and rock singer, songwriter, and music executive whose career spans nearly seven decades. He is best known for his work as part of Tony Orlando and Dawn.

In 1993, he opened the Tony Orlando Yellow Ribbon Music Theatre in Branson, Missouri. He ended his act there in 2013 and has continued to perform many live shows as a headliner, mostly in Las Vegas. When his song "Candida" became an international No. 1 song, he began to use his name in the group becoming "Dawn featuring Tony Orlando" and then "Tony Orlando and Dawn". The group had 19 other top 40 tracks, including "Tie a Yellow Ribbon Round the Ole Oak Tree", the top-selling hit of 1973 and one of the biggest selling singles of all time. The group also had a hit variety program, The Tony Orlando and Dawn Show on CBS from 1974 to 1976. They broke up in 1977 and he has since performed as Tony Orlando. In 1985, he portrayed Tony Castillo in The Cosby Show on Season 1 Episode 23 titled "Mr. Quite".

Orlando retired from performing on the road, in concert in 2024, after 64 years. He shifted his focus to movies, Broadway, streaming new product, and writing another book.

== Early life ==
Michael Anthony Orlando Cassavitis was born on April 3, 1944, the son of a Greek father and a Puerto Rican mother. During his early years, he lived in Chelsea, Manhattan, on West 21st Street. In his teenage years, the family moved to Union City, New Jersey and Hasbrouck Heights, New Jersey.

== Musical career ==
=== Early career ===
Orlando's musical career started with The Five Gents, a doo-wop group he formed in 1959 at age 15, with whom he recorded demo tapes. He got the attention of music publisher and producer Don Kirshner, who hired him to write songs in an office across from New York's Brill Building, along with Carole King, Neil Sedaka, Toni Wine, Barry Mann, Bobby Darin, Connie Francis, and Tom and Jerry, who didn't make it in the office until they changed their name to Simon and Garfunkel.

Kirshner also hired Orlando to record songwriter demos as a solo artist, and his first success came at the age of 16 when he charted in North America and UK with the hits "Bless You" and "Halfway To Paradise". He also appeared at the Brooklyn Paramount Theater with DJ Murray the K. Orlando also had four records that "Bubbled Under" the Hot 100: "Chills" in 1962, "Shirley" and "I'll Be There" in 1963, and "I Was A Boy (When You Needed A Man)" as by Billy Shields in April 1969. Gerry Goffin and Jack Keller wrote a doo-wop version of Stephen Foster's song "Beautiful Dreamer" for Orlando. Released as a single in 1962, the song was picked up by the Beatles who included it in their set lists on the Beatles Winter 1963 Helen Shapiro Tour; a recorded version was released on their 2013 album On Air – Live at the BBC Volume 2.

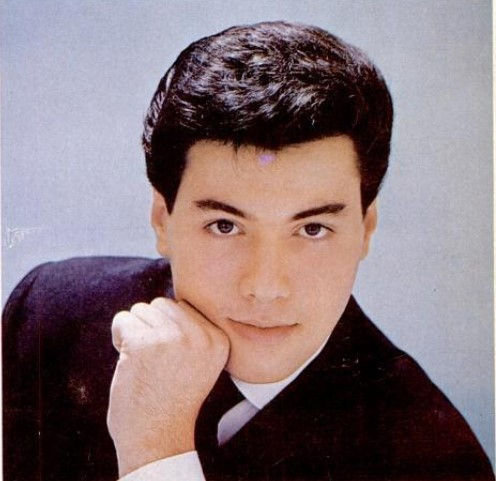
Orlando in 1965

Orlando continued as a solo artist and also became a producer himself, as well as a successful music executive in the late 1960s. Orlando was associated with Columbia Records publishing subsidiary April-Blackwood Music.

By the late 1960s, Orlando had worked his way up to vice president of a larger publishing company, CBS Music, where he signed, co-wrote with, and produced Barry Manilow (under the name "Featherbed"). He also worked with other artists, such as The Yardbirds; James Taylor; Grateful Dead; Blood, Sweat & Tears; and Laura Nyro. In the summer of 1969, he recorded with the studio group Wind and had a number 28 hit that year with "Make Believe" on producer Bo Gentry's Life Records. Columbia president Clive Davis did nothing to stop Orlando from singing lead on "Candida" after his friends Hank Medress and Dave Appel asked him for a favor. The stage name they chose—Dawn—was the middle name of the daughter of label executive Steve Wax.

=== Tony Orlando and Dawn ===
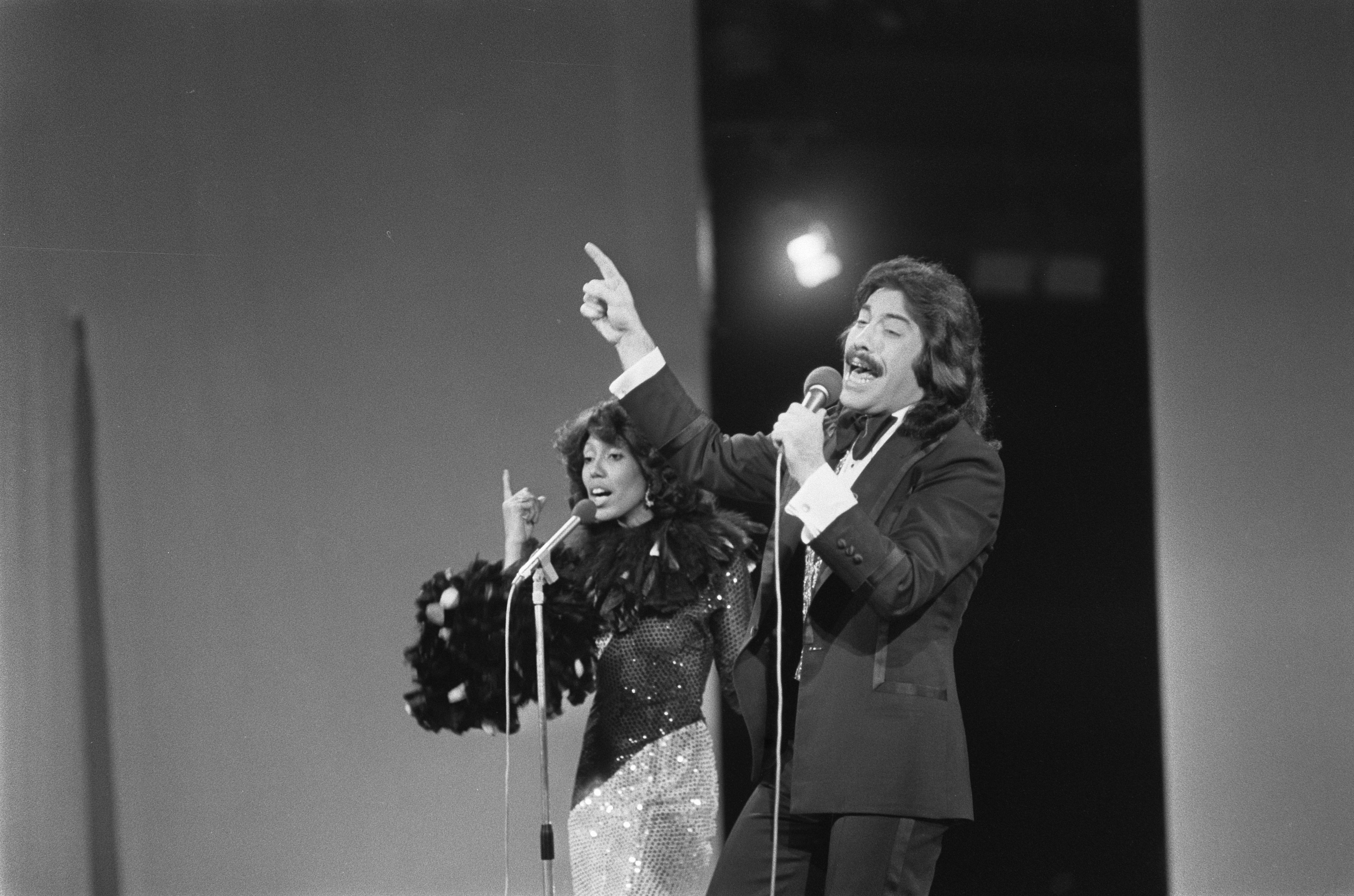
Performing in 1974 alongside Telma Hopkins

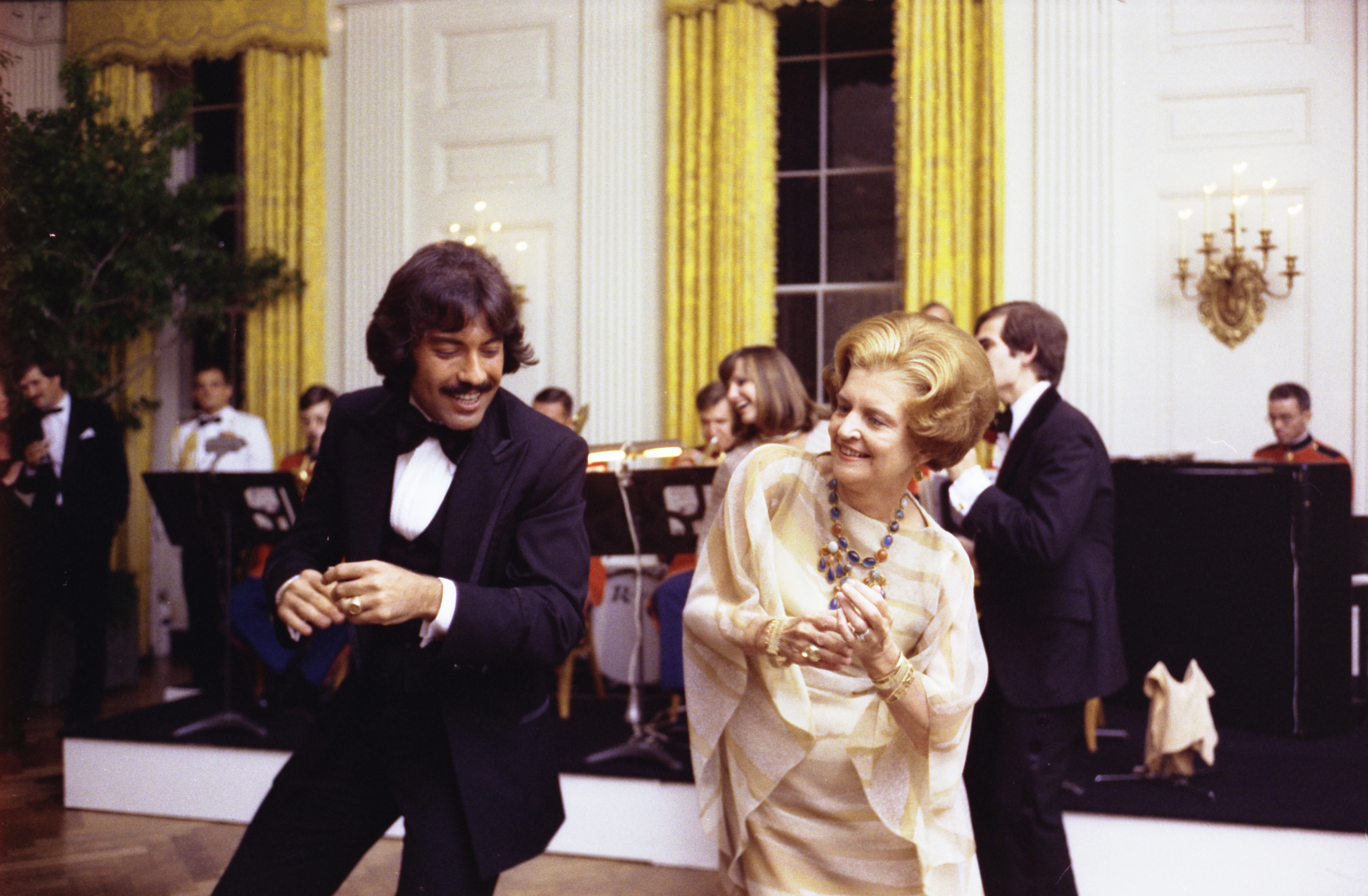
Dancing with First Lady Betty Ford after a state dinner at the White House in 1976

Orlando recorded "Candida" with backup singers including Toni Wine (who wrote the song) and Linda November. Concerned about a possible conflict of interest with his April-Blackwood duties, Orlando sang under the condition that his name not be associated with the project, so it was released under the simple name of "Dawn", the middle name of the daughter of Bell records executive Steve Wax.

"Candida" became a worldwide hit in 1970, reaching number one in five countries, and the top ten in many others, including number three in the United States. Dawn, with Wine and November again singing backup, recorded another song, "Knock Three Times", which itself became a #1 hit. Orlando then wanted to go on tour, and asked two other session singers, Telma Hopkins and Joyce Vincent Wilson to join for the tour. Orlando then discovered that there were six touring groups using that name, so Dawn became "Dawn featuring Tony Orlando", which changed to Tony Orlando and Dawn in 1973.

The new group recorded more hits, including "Tie a Yellow Ribbon Round the Ole Oak Tree" (1973) and "He Don't Love You (Like I Love You)" (1975), a cover of the Jerry Butler hit, "He Will Break Your Heart". With a successful recording career, Orlando then set his sights on television. As described in the San Francisco Chronicle, "Tony Orlando and Dawn burst out of television sets during the Ford administration, a sunny antidote to the dark cynicism that followed Watergate. He represented simple, traditional values, a conservative return to pure entertainment. He drew a happy face in the "O" of his autograph. It was not terribly cool, but America loved him." The Tony Orlando and Dawn show on CBS became a hit, a summer replacement for the Sonny & Cher show, and ran for three seasons from 1974 to 1976. It welcomed the biggest names in show business each week as Orlando's guests, including his boyhood idols, Jackie Gleason and Jerry Lewis.

On October 12, 2015, with Telma Hopkins and Joyce Vincent Wilson present, Pacific Pioneer Broadcasters honored Orlando with their Art Gilmore Career Achievement Award at a celebrity luncheon.

=== Late 1970s onwards ===
Along with the fame, Orlando had personal battles in the 1970s. He was briefly addicted to cocaine, and battled both weight gain and depression. In 1977, due to the death of his sister and the suicide of Orlando's close friend, comedian Freddie Prinze, Orlando had a breakdown and retired from singing. He was briefly institutionalized, but returned to television with an NBC comeback special. From then, he continued as a solo artist, charting with two singles – the dance hit "Don't Let Go" in 1978 and "Sweets for My Sweet" in 1979. In the 1980s, he was a dominant force in Las Vegas, headlining various hotels with sold-out audiences.

Tony Orlando was the subject of a song by the American indie rock band Yo La Tengo on their album And Then Nothing Turned Itself Inside-Out, titled "Let's Save Tony Orlando's House", named after one of the many previous film and television roles of The Simpsons character Troy McClure.

Orlando continued primarily as a solo singer, performing on tour and regularly in Las Vegas and Branson, Missouri. He hosted the New York City portions of the MDA Labor Day Telethon on WNEW/WNYW and WWOR-TV from 1980 to 2011, leaving in response to Jerry Lewis' firing from the Muscular Dystrophy Association.

In 2020, Orlando began hosting a Saturday night oldies program for WABC Radio as the New York City station partially restored its music format. Orlando retired from performing on the road, in concert in 2024, after sixty-four years. Hopkins and Wilson joined him on stage. He shifted his focus to movies, Broadway, streaming new product, and writing his next book.

== Acting career ==
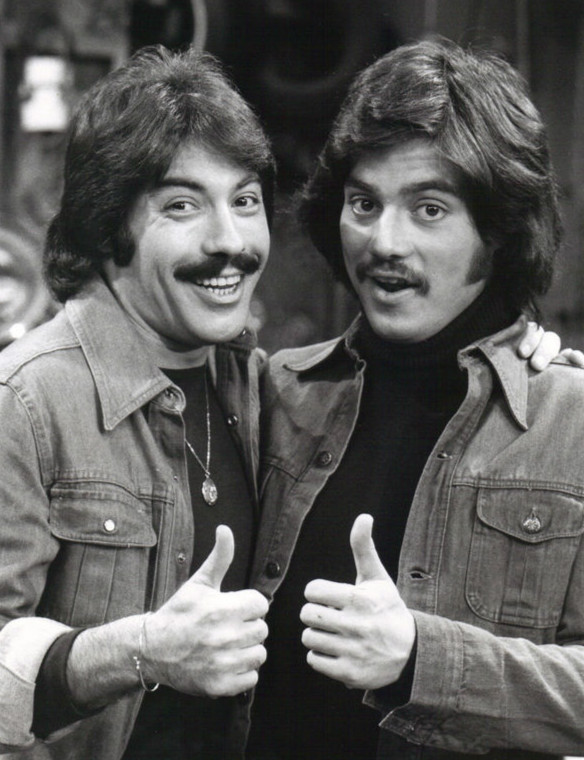
Orlando (left) and Freddie Prinze in Chico and the Man (1976)

Orlando's first TV appearance was in 1976 on the series Chico and the Man as "Tomas Garcia". He starred in the 1981 TV movie 300 Miles For Stephanie, playing a police officer who promises to walk over 300 miles to a sanctuary in order to obtain God's help to cure Stephanie, his gravely ill daughter. Others in the cast included Edward James Olmos, Pepe Serna and Julie Carmen.

In May 1981, Orlando appeared on Broadway in the title role of Barnum, replacing Jim Dale, who was on a three-week vacation.

In 2003, Orlando had a recurring role in the children's animated series Oswald, in which he did the voice of "Sammy Starfish".

Orlando appeared in an episode of MADtv doing a sketch involving a court case, where the defense sings to persuade the jury about their side. He sang for the prosecution, thereby persuading the judge to give the defense jail for life. In another television program, Orlando was featured in Larry the Cable Guy's Star Studded Christmas Extravaganza. He appeared in That's My Boy as Steve Spirou, a Happy Madison production starring Adam Sandler in 2012.

== Support for veterans ==
Orlando is a longtime advocate for U.S. military veterans and "Tie a Yellow Ribbon Round the Ole Oak Tree" has become an anthem for service members.

Orlando serves on the board of directors for the Eisenhower Foundation, as well as honorary chairman of Snowball Express, an organization that serves the children of fallen military heroes.

He hosts the annual Congressional Medal of Honor dinner in Dallas. He has served as the master of ceremonies at the Secretary of Defense Freedom Awards at the Pentagon in Washington, D.C.

== Personal life ==
Orlando was introduced by Jerry Lee Lewis to his future wife, Elaine, who had previously dated Buddy Holly and who had previously been married to folk rock composer Fred Neil. Tony and Elaine married in 1965, and had one child, Jon; they divorced in 1984. Five years later, Orlando was engaged to Francine Amormino, whom he married on April 29, 1990. The couple remained married as of 2026, they have one child.

On February 27, 2013, his mother, Ruth Schroeder of Hollister, Missouri, died in Branson, Missouri of a diabetic stroke.

In 2002, he wrote a memoir, Halfway to Paradise with Patsi Bale Cox.

Orlando was interviewed on The 700 Club explaining that he was raised Catholic and was "brought up with the Lord as my Savior"; but after a self-destructive period following his professional success with Dawn, he became a born-again Christian in 1978.

In 1990, Orlando received a star on the Hollywood Walk of Fame at 6385 Hollywood Blvd.

== Awards ==
He has won the Casino Entertainer of the Year Award, the Best All Around Entertainer–Las Vegas four times and prior to that, three times in Atlantic City, the Jukebox Artist of the Year Award from the Amusement and Music Owners Association of New York, The Ellis Island Medal of Honor, and has also been bestowed with The Bob Hope Award for excellence in entertainment from the Congressional Medal of Honor Society in honor of his efforts on behalf of United States veterans. His work on behalf of American veterans led to his being named Honorary Chairman at the 40th Anniversary at the NAM-POW's Homecoming Celebration at the Richard M. Nixon Presidential Library in 2014.

== Discography ==
=== Albums ===
- Bless You and 11 Other Great Hits (December 1961)
- Make Believe (August 1969) (with 'Wind')
- Before Dawn (1973)
- Tony Orlando (August 1978)
- I Got Rhythm (May 1979)
- Livin' for the Music (1980)
- Halfway to Paradise: The Complete Epic Masters 1961–1964 (2006)
- Bless You (2014)

=== Solo singles ===
- "Halfway to Paradise" (1961) US #39, CB #17, CAN #3
- "Bless You" (1961) US #15, CB #17 UK #5, CAN #5
- "Happy Times (Are Here To Stay)" (1961) US #82, CB #76
- "Chills" (1962) US #109, CB #111
- "At the Edge of Tears" (1962) CB #146
- "Shirley" (1963) US #133, CB #109
- "I'll Be There" (1963) US #124, CB #123
- "What Am I Gonna Do" (1963) CB #tag
- "Tell Me What Can I Do" (1964) CB #147
- "To Wait For Love" (1964) CB #119
- "I Was A Boy" (1969) US #109, CB #89 (as Billy Shields)
- "Make Believe" (1969) US #28, CB #18 (with 'Wind')
- "I'll Hold Out My Hand" (1969) CB #114 (with 'Wind')
- "Don't Let Go" (1978) Dance #27, AC #48
- "Sweets for My Sweet" (1979) US #54, CB #55, AC #20
- "Pullin' Together" (1980)

=== Bibliography ===
- Orlando, Tony (2002). Halfway to Paradise. With Patsi Bale Cox. St. Martine's Press. ISBN 0-312-26603-0.

== See also ==
- Tony Orlando and Dawn
- Tony Orlando and Dawn (TV series)
- List of Puerto Ricans
