= Frank Owen =

Frank Owen may refer to:

- Frank Owen (baseball) (1879–1942), American baseball player
- Frank Owen (politician) (1905–1979), British journalist, author and MP
- Frank Owen III (1926–1999), American politician from Texas
- Frank Owen (author) (1893–1968), American author, novelist and anthologist
- Frank Owen (artist) (born 1939), American abstract painter

== See also ==
- Frank Owens
