= I Woke Up in Love This Morning =

Single by The Partridge Family

from the album Sound Magazine
- B-side: "Twenty-Four Hours a Day"
- Released: August 1971
- Genre: Pop
- Length: 2:43
- Label: Bell Records
- Songwriters: L. Russell Brown, Irwin Levine
- Producer: Wes Farrell

The Partridge Family singles chronology
"I'll Meet You Halfway" (1971)	"I Woke Up in Love This Morning" (1971)	"Am I Losing You" (1972)

"I Woke Up in Love This Morning" is a song written by L. Russell Brown and Irwin Levine and recorded by The Partridge Family for their 1971 album, Sound Magazine. It went to number 13 on the Billboard Hot 100 in 1971; it hit number 4 in Canada.

Cash Box called it a "splendidly commercial outing."

== Chart performance ==
=== Weekly charts ===
Chart (1971)	Peak position
Australia KMR	5
Canada RPM Top Singles	4
Canada RPM Adult Contemporary	24
US Billboard Hot 100	13
US Billboard Adult Contemporary	14
US Cash Box Top 100	9

=== Year-end charts ===
Chart (1971)	Rank
Australia	76
Canada	54
US Billboard Hot 100	88
US Cash Box Top 100	49

== Later versions ==
- David Cassidy on 1998 album, Old Trick New Dog
- Doug Powell on the Not Lame 2002 bubblegum cover compilation, Right to Chews
- Ron Miles on his 2006 album, Blossom/Stone
- Max Romeo
- Weezer as a Japanese bonus track on their 2009 album, Raditude
- The Persuasions acapella version on their 1985 album, no Frills
