= Once in a While (Dean Martin album) =

Studio album by Dean Martin
- Released: 1978
- Recorded: November 1974
- Genres: Traditional pop, Country
- Length: 28:30
- Label: Reprise – R/RS 6428
- Producer: Jimmy Bowen

Dean Martin chronology
You're the Best Thing That Ever Happened to Me (1973)	Once in a While (1978)	The Nashville Sessions (1983)

Once in a While is the thirty-third studio album by Dean Martin, produced by Jimmy Bowen. It was released four years after it was recorded.

The album consists of traditional pop standards, recorded in country pop arrangements. Many of the songs were associated with singer Bing Crosby.

It was reissued on CD by Capitol Records in 2006 and Hip-O Records in 2009.

== Reception ==
Professional ratings
Review scores
Source	Rating
Allmusic	2.5/5 stars

William Ruhlmann on Allmusic.com gave the album two and a half stars out of five. Ruhlmann said that "Martin had no trouble negotiating such arrangements, though, and his familiarity with the songs themselves made his interpretations more comfortable than ever".

== Track listing ==
1. "Twilight on the Trail" (Louis Alter, Sidney Mitchell) – 4:18
2. "Love Thy Neighbor" (Mack Gordon, Harry Revel) – 2:42
3. "Without a Word of Warning" (Gordon, Revel) – 2:50
4. "That Old Gang of Mine" (Mort Dixon, Ray Henderson, Billy Rose) – 2:28
5. "The Day You Came Along" (Sam Coslow, Arthur Johnston) – 2:58
6. "It's Magic" (Sammy Cahn, Jule Styne) – 2:27
7. "If I Had You" (Irving King, Ted Shapiro) – 2:32
8. "Only Forever" (Johnny Burke, James V. Monaco) – 3:12
9. "I Cried for You" (Gus Arnheim, Arthur Freed, Abe Lyman) – 2:55
10. "Once in a While" (Michael Edwards, Bud Green) – 2:49

== Personnel ==
- Dean Martin – vocals
- Phil Baugh – musicians
- Pete Carpenter
- Michael Lang
- Don Lanier
- Larrie Londin – drums
- Willie Ornelas
- Joe Osborn – bass
- Reinhold Press, Jr.
- Don Randi – keyboards
- Bobby Wood – keyboards
- Neil LeVang – guitar
- Hal Blaine – drums
- Ron Slenzak – photography
- Alan Moore – string arrangements
- Tim Baty – background vocals
- Lea Jane Berinati
- Thomas Brannon
- Janie Fricke
- Ginger Holladay – backing vocals
- Jimmy Bowen – record producer
