= That Old Gang of Mine (song) =

1923 popular song by Ray Henderson, Billy Rose & Mort Dixon

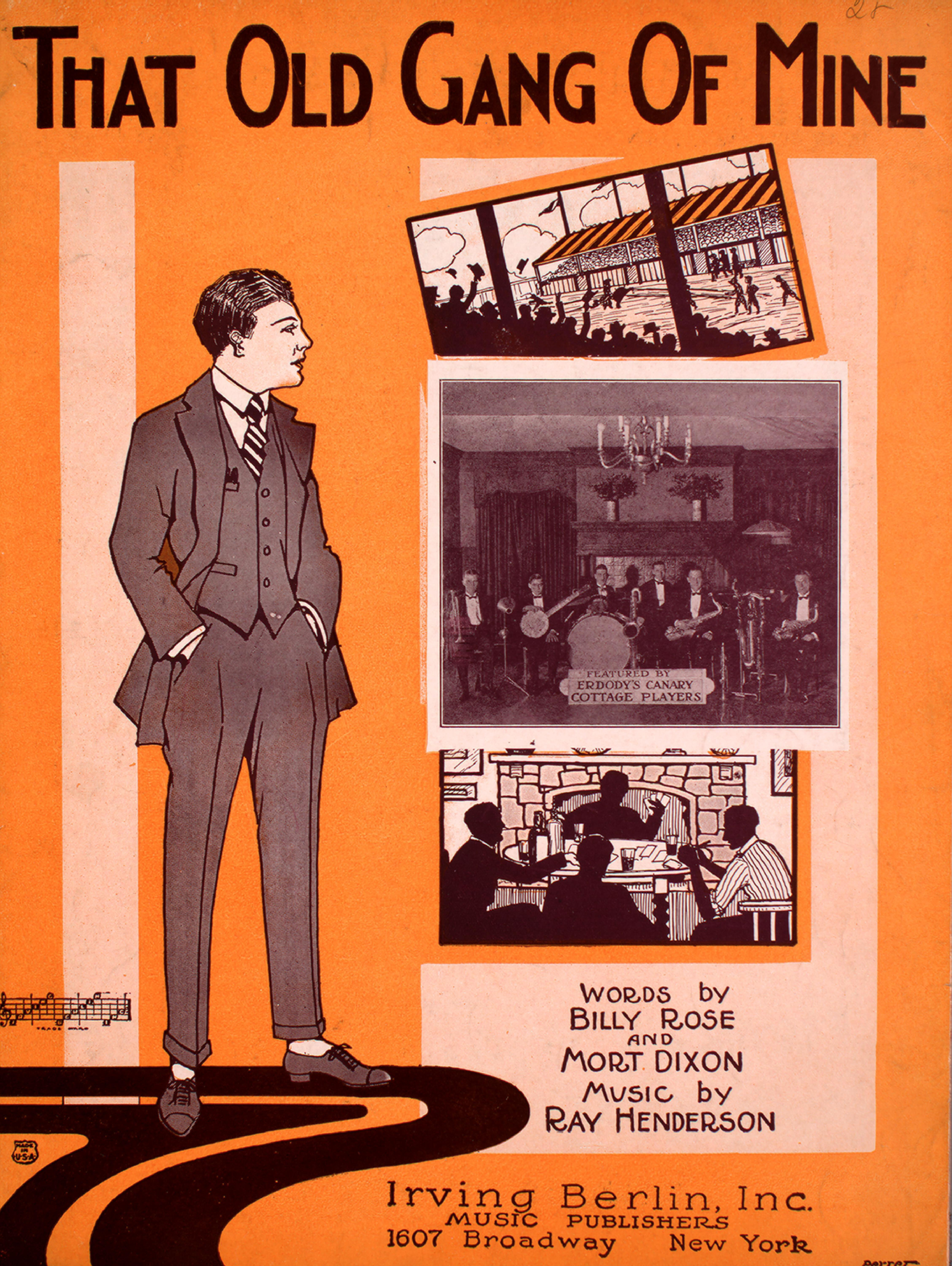

Song
- Published: 1923 by Irving Berlin, Inc.
- Composer: Ray Henderson
- Lyricists: Billy Rose, Mort Dixon

Audio
- Recording of That Old Gang of Mine, performed by the Billy Murray and Ed Smalle (1923): file; help

"That Old Gang of Mine" is a 1923 popular song composed by Ray Henderson with lyrics by Billy Rose and Mort Dixon, and published by Irving Berlin, Inc. It was introduced in the Ziegfeld Follies of 1923 by the vaudeville duo Van and Schenck. The song became a million-seller.

The song was recorded by many artists in 1923. On June 5, Billy Murray and Ed Smalle recorded the most popular version of "That Old Gang of Mine" (Victor 19095), which went to #1 on US charts. Other recording artists that charted with the song in 1923 were Benny Krueger and His Orchestra (peaked at #3), Billy Jones and Ernest Hare (peaked at #6), and The Benson Orchestra of Chicago (peaked at #6). The 1923 silent film The Country Kid used the song as its musical theme, and sheet music promoting the film was printed.

In 1950, Rose, Dixon, and Henderson filed to regain rights to the song, but the Court ruled that the publisher was entitled to renew its right.

Frank Fontaine sang an abbreviated version of the song during a 1962 episode of Jackie Gleason's The American Scene Magazine on CBS.

== Other recordings ==
- Bing Crosby - included in his album Bing Crosby's Treasury - The Songs I Love (1968 version) (1968).
- Buddy Clark (1942)
- Dean Martin - included in his album Once in a While (1978)
- Dick Robertson (1938)
- Mitch Miller and the Gang (1961)
- Peggy Lee (1945)
- Perry Como (1939) and (1951)
- The Crew Cuts (1959)
