= Frank Owen (artist) =

American painter

- Frank Owen, Searcher (2018)
- Born: 1939; Kalispell, Montana
- Education: University of California, Davis
- Known for: painting
- Style: Abstract art, Gestural abstraction, Abstract Landscape
- Movement: Abstract Expressionism, Process Art, Post-minimalism
- Awards: National Endowment for the Arts Fellowship; 1978-79, 1989-90

Frank Owen (born 1939) is an American abstract painter based in Keene, New York.

== Early life and education ==
Owen was born in 1939 in Kalispell, Montana and spent much of his childhood in Woodland, California.

After two years at Antioch College, Owen returned to California and attended Sacramento State before joining the University of California, Davis arts program. At UC Davis, Owen studied under William T. Wiley and Wayne Thiebaud alongside artists including David Gilhooly, Richard Shaw, Stephen Kaltenbach and Bruce Nauman. While a student, Owen exhibited works in Davis, Chico and Sacramento, and collaborated with Nauman on 16mm film projects. He graduated with a B.A. in 1966 and an M.A. in 1968, and received a Regents Fellowship in 1967-1968.

== Artistic career ==
Owen moved to New York after completing his M.A., joining a community of SoHo-based artists. His first solo New York show at the Leo Castelli Gallery in 1972 included a number of large canvases described by the art critic David L. Shirey as "[r]esembling something like Paisley prints or enlarged marble paper gone berserk". The large works produced during this period were described in 1974 by Newsweek art critic Douglas Davis as "richly impacted with rough, writhing shapes and textured in hundreds of colors that have been poured and whipped onto the surface."

In 1975 Owen again collaborated with Bruce Nauman on the film project Pursuit, in which 16 people are shown running on a conveyor belt, one by one, until exhausted.

In 1979, Owen established a professional relationship with the Nancy Hoffman Gallery that continues to the present day. His first solo show with Hoffman took place in 1981, again featuring large-scale works including one eighteen feet wide.

After moving permanently to the Adirondacks in 1981 to join his wife and her family, Owen's work began to include elements drawn from the surroundings of his new home, as he described in a 1987 interview:

I'm much more interested in the small disasters of breakages and windfalls and thickets and things that operate on a level that a human being really experiences as you move through the trees with--ducking branches at eye level... And some of these geometric forms that are prominent in the paintings are really echoes of what I'll see right out my studio window in the wintertime when the branches are covered with snow and everything is just very stark and spiky.

Since 1999, Owen's work has been roughly divided into two series: Venetians, inspired by the colors of Venetian glass beads, and works that draw from the seasonal colors of the Adirondacks and embed images of leaves, sticks, and stones between layers of paint.

== Style and technique ==
Owen's early professional work is built upon the gestural abstraction of Jackson Pollock, using acrylic paint partially mixed with vivid pigments and poured on paper or canvas from buckets, bottles or caps, then manipulated to create a marbled effect. In 1973 the critic Peter Schjeldahl described this early work as having a "particular dialectic... between an overall 'marbleized' look that is essentially impersonal — it is hard to imagine that a mere human hand could have performed anything so intricately gorgeous — and subtle, intelligently directed exertions of drawing and composition that become apparent on closer scrutiny."

The most prominent technique in Owen's work is a distinctive process known as "painting in verso". Owen adopted this method in the 1970s at the prompting of his friend Art Schade, initially using large beds of modelling clay, carved and cut to create spaces into which paint could be poured. Once dry, the paint was lifted from the clay, manipulated further, and affixed to the canvas front-to-back to create a three-dimensional surface.

Owen shifted from clay to use high-density polyethylene as the base to create the "skins" that make up his works; he describes himself as a "laminator", visualizing the finished piece and assembling it in layers:

Working first with polyethylene coated paper, he scores, cuts, and carves the plastic, amassing a trove of peculiar abstract shapes. Then, he peels off individual elements and applies them to canvas; in doing this, he plays the roles of both composer and editor. Finally, he paints.

Throughout his career, Owen's work has featured vibrant juxtaposed colors, with later works making frequent use of color disharmony between organic and geometric forms.

== Academic career ==
After graduating from UC Davis, Owen took up a position at Sacramento State before moving to the east coast. Between 1970 and 1980 he taught at the School of Visual Arts in New York. During the 1980s he held visiting artist and lecturer positions, including at Virginia Commonwealth University and the University of North Carolina, Chapel Hill. He completed his academic career at the University of Vermont, joining its arts faculty in 1993 and retiring as a full professor in 2011.

== Selected public collections ==
- National Gallery of Art, Washington DC
- Yale University Art Gallery, New Haven, CT
- Ackland Art Museum, Chapel Hill, NC
- Albright–Knox Art Gallery, Buffalo, NY
- Flint Institute of Arts, Flint, MI
- Chazen Museum of Art, Madison, WI
- Kemper Museum of Contemporary Art, Kansas City, MO
- Allen Memorial Art Museum, Oberlin, OH
- Faulconer Gallery at Grinnell College, Grinell, IA
- University Museum of Contemporary Art, Amherst, MA
- Springfield Art Museum, Springfield, MO
- Des Moines Art Center, Des Moines, IA
- Frederick R. Weisman Art Foundation, Los Angeles, CA
- Honolulu Museum of Art Spalding House, Honolulu, HI
- St Louis Art Museum, St Louis, MO
- Manetti Shrem Museum of Art, Davis, CA
- Plattsburgh State Art Museum, Plattsburgh, NY
- Madison Museum of Contemporary Art, Madison, WI

== Selected exhibitions ==
- 2022 "Retrospection", Nancy Hoffman Gallery, New York.
- 2018 "Retroflection", Lake George Arts Project’s Courthouse Gallery, Lake George, NY
- 2016 "Ways and Means" (Norte Maar), 1285 Avenue of the Americas Art Gallery, New York (group exhibition)
- 2015 "Next", Nancy Hoffman Gallery, New York.
- 2010 "Raft", Nancy Hoffman Gallery, New York
- 2004 "Threaders", Nancy Hoffman Gallery, New York
- 2002 "Transformation of Nature", California State University
- 2001 Nancy Hoffman Gallery, New York; Atea Ring Gallery, Westport, New York
- 1997 "Collectors’ Choice Exhibition", Center for the Arts, Vero Beach, Florida
- 1991 Francis Colburn Gallery, University of Vermont, Burlington; Judy Youens Gallery,

Houston, Texas

- 1987 The Cook Company Gallery, Rancho Cordova, California.
- 1981 Nancy Hoffman Gallery, New York
- 1973 "Six Painters of the Seventies: Abstract Painting in New York", William Hayes Ackland Art Center (group exhibition)
- 1972 Leo Castelli Gallery, New York; The New Gallery, Cleveland, Ohio

== Awards ==
- 2010 Barnett and Annalee Newman Foundation Grant-award
- 2001-02 Kroepsch-Maurice Excellence in Teaching Award, University of Vermont
- 1993-94 Faculty Development Grant, University of Vermont
- 1989-90 National Endowment for the Arts Fellowship
- 1978-79 National Endowment for the Arts Fellowship
- 1967-68 University of California Regent’s Fellowship, 1967-68

== The "Slant Step" ==
In 1963, William T. Wiley bought an oddly-slanted wood and linoleum step stool at a junk shop in Mill Valley, California for fifty cents, and gave it to Bruce Nauman, who kept it in his studio. The stool attracted the attention of students and faculty at the UC Davis art program, as a found object that provided "cultish inspiration", provoking drawings, sculptures and other work. In September 1966 it was exhibited alongside those works in the Slant Step Show at the Berkeley Gallery in San Francisco; during the exhibition, the step vanished from the gallery, supposedly taken by Richard Serra to New York and subsequently returned to California by Stephen Kaltenbach. In 1969 the Slant Step Book was published, containing visual and literary works related to the step.

In 2010, Owen disclosed that he had taken the step from Davis in 1967 and used it as a teaching aid in his various faculty positions. He and other UC Davis alumni artists collectively served as its caretakers, occasionally loaning it to exhibitions and dubbing themselves "The New York Society for the Preservation of the Slant Step": "Somebody has got to keep the damn thing so we -- myself, Arthur Schade, and a couple of other buddies -- kept it."

In 2012, Owen and Schade donated the step to UC Davis in conjunction with the exhibition "Flatlanders on the Slant", valuing the piece for tax purposes at the fifty cents it cost Wiley in 1963. In 2014, the writer and artist Peter Plagens established the purpose of the step: it was designed to raise the knees while defecating.

In 2019 the Slant Step Book was reissued on its 50th anniversary to accompany an exhibition at the Verge Center for the Arts in Sacramento celebrating the step's history and continuing influence on artists.
