= Joyce Vincent Wilson =

American singer (born 1946)

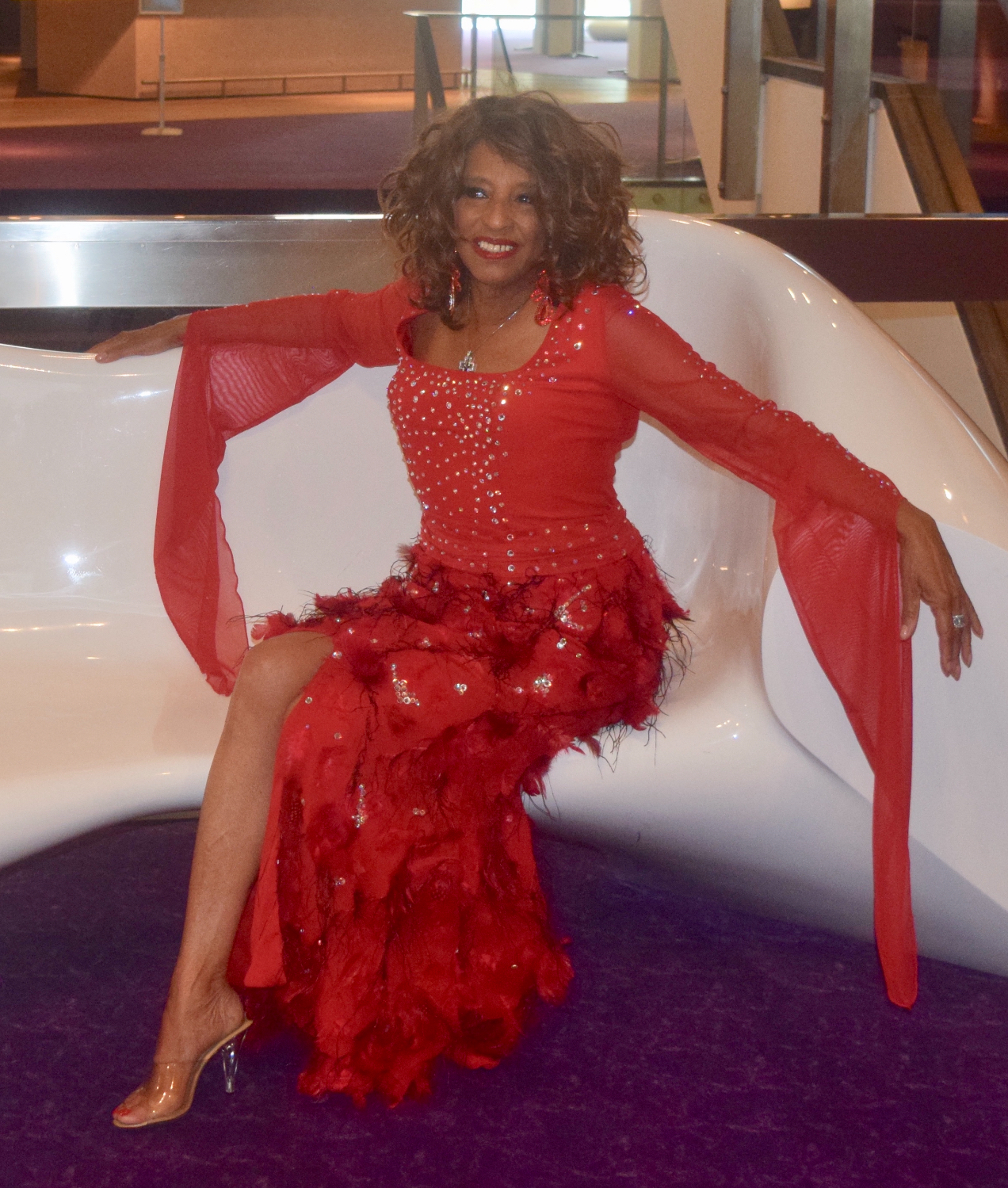
- Wilson in 2023

Background information
- Born: December 14, 1946 (age 79); Detroit, Michigan, United States
- Genres: R&B, soul, jazz
- Occupation: Singer
- Instrument: Vocals
- Years active: 1960s–present

Joyce Vincent Wilson (born December 14, 1946) is an American singer, best known as part of the group Tony Orlando and Dawn. Her sister, Pamela Wilson, is also a vocalist.

== Biography ==
Wilson began her career in Detroit providing background vocals on Motown and Golden World recordings. She met Telma Hopkins during this time, and the two provided background vocals at Holland–Dozier–Holland's Invictus/Hot Wax Records.

Orlando released the singles "Candida" and "Knock Three Times", recorded with session vocalists such as Linda November and Toni Wine backing him, under the name Dawn; when the singles charted, Orlando needed a backing group to tour and record with. Wilson and Telma Hopkins joined Orlando to perform as Dawn. The group later had their own successful television program (Tony Orlando and Dawn), and Wilson was featured on hit singles including "He Don't Love You (Like I Love You)", "Tie a Yellow Ribbon Round the Ole Oak Tree" and "Say, Has Anybody Seen My Sweet Gypsy Rose".

Wilson had once been considered as a replacement in an official grouping of the Supremes following former member Mary Wilson's departure. It was decided by Motown that the group should not continue without an original member, and the Supremes disbanded in 1977.

Wilson sang as a backing vocalist on Scherrie Payne and Susaye Greene's duet album Partners in 1979.

As The Vincent Sisters, Wilson, along with sister Pamela Vincent, have provided background vocals for Tony Orlando, most notably on a Jerry Lewis Telethon.

A friend of Payne, Wilson has also provided backing vocals during her solo concerts. In 2006, Wilson and her sister Pamela provided backing vocals at a twentieth anniversary concert celebrated by the Former Ladies of the Supremes (FLOS). In January 2007, both Wilson and Vincent provided backing vocals for Payne at a performance in Los Angeles. In that same year, Vincent filled in for Freddi Poole in the FLOS for a tour with Payne and Lynda Laurence, when Poole was suffering from the death of her mother. Wilson and Vincent also perform with the "Inspirational Voices of Free" choir, and were also members of the short-lived supergroup Tour de 4Force. The quintet also included Jim Gilstrap, Theresa Davis (of the Emotions) and Payne.

As part of Tony Orlando and Dawn, Vincent Wilson was inducted into the Vocal Group Hall of Fame in 2007.

In 2009, Wilson replaced Poole in the FLOS, and made her performance debut on October 3, 2009.
