= Say, Has Anybody Seen My Sweet Gypsy Rose =

Single by Tony Orlando and Dawn

from the album Dawn's New Ragtime Follies
- B-side: "The Spark of Love Is Kindlin'"
- Released: July 1973
- Genre: Pop
- Length: 2:51
- Label: Bell
- Songwriters: Irwin Levine; L. Russell Brown
- Producers: Hank Medress; Dave Appell

Tony Orlando and Dawn singles chronology
"Tie a Yellow Ribbon Round the Ole Oak Tree" (1973)	"Say, Has Anybody Seen My Sweet Gypsy Rose" (1973)	"Who's in the Strawberry Patch with Sally" (1973)

"Say, Has Anybody Seen My Sweet Gypsy Rose" is a 1973 song by the American pop music group Tony Orlando and Dawn. Written by Irwin Levine and L. Russell Brown, it was included on the group's 1973 album, Dawn's New Ragtime Follies.

== History ==
The songwriting duo of Levine and Brown had also penned other Tony Orlando and Dawn hits, including "Knock Three Times" and "Tie a Yellow Ribbon Round the Ole Oak Tree". According to Orlando, Levine was a fan of singer Al Jolson and proposed the concept of "Say, Has Anybody Seen..." to producer Hank Medress. Orlando is quoted as saying: "Irwin Levine, the lyricist of the two, had this love for Jolson. He said, 'Hank, I'd like to write some songs that could have been written in the early 1900s.'" With this concept in mind, the songwriters, producers and musicians began creating Dawn's New Ragtime Follies.

== Lyric content ==
The selection is narrated by a husband seeking his wife in New Orleans, Louisiana. Shocked and in disbelief that his wife, named Mary Jo, would abandon him and their children to join a burlesque show at "The Land Of Dreams," a New Orleans strip joint, where she calls herself "Sweet Gypsy Rose," he devotes himself to searching for her. He hopes to convince her to give up her activities as a stripper and return to their home and family.

== Release and reception ==
Officially credited as being performed by Dawn featuring Tony Orlando and released as the lead single from the aforementioned album, "Say, Has Anybody Seen..." became the group's fourth top ten single on the Billboard Hot 100 chart in September 1973, peaking at #3. The song spent three weeks atop the Billboard adult contemporary chart in August and September of that year. It reached #12 on the UK Singles Chart at roughly the same time, and made it to #2 on the Australian pop chart. It was later used as the intro song for a section called "Gipsy Rose Dick" as part of the CBBC programme "Dick and Dom's Hoopla."

== Chart history ==
=== Weekly charts ===
Chart (1973)	Peak position
Argentina	18
Australia (Kent Music Report)	2
Canada RPM Top Singles	4
Canada RPM Adult Contemporary	2
Ireland (IRMA)	8
UK (OCC)	12
US Billboard Hot 100	3
US Billboard Adult Contemporary	1
US Cash Box Top 100	4

=== Year-end charts ===
Chart (1973)	Rank
Australia	25
Canada	55
US Billboard Hot 100	34
US Cash Box	17

== Cover versions ==
Also in 1973, Terry Stafford included the song on the 7" single release of his hit, "Amarillo by Morning."

David Alan Grier performed it for a sketch in Amazon Women on the Moon.

== See also ==
- List of number-one adult contemporary singles of 1973 (U.S.)
- List of Top 25 singles for 1973 in Australia
