= He Will Break Your Heart =

1960 single by Jerry Butler

Single by Jerry Butler
- B-side: "Thanks to You"
- Released: August 1960
- Recorded: 1960
- Studio: Universal Recording Corp. (Chicago)
- Genre: R&B
- Length: 2:40
- Label: Vee-Jay
- Songwriters: Jerry Butler, Calvin Carter, Curtis Mayfield

Jerry Butler singles chronology
| "A Lonely Soldier" (1960) | "He Will Break Your Heart" (1960) | "Silent Night" (1960) |

"He Will Break Your Heart", is a song originally performed and co-written by Jerry Butler. It was a top-ten hit in 1960.

In 1975, Tony Orlando and Dawn released the song under the title "He Don't Love You (Like I Love You)". Their version topped the Billboard Hot 100 chart on May 3, 1975, and the US adult contemporary chart.

== Origins ==
"He Will Break Your Heart" was written by Jerry Butler, Calvin Carter, and Curtis Mayfield. The song was recorded by Butler and released as a single in 1960, where it peaked at No. 7 on the Billboard Hot 100 chart and No. 3 on the Cash Box Top 100. In addition, Butler's recording spent seven non-consecutive weeks at No. 1 on the U.S. R&B chart. Subsequent cover versions of "He Will Break Your Heart" were released by artists such as Margie Singleton and Lulu (both regendering the song to She Will Break Your Heart), The Righteous Brothers and Freddie Scott.

=== Charts ===
| Chart (1960–61) | Peak position |
|---|---|
| CAN CHUM Chart | 9 |
| US Billboard Hot 100 | 7 |
| US Billboard R&B | 1 |
| US Cash Box Top 100 | 3 |

== Tony Orlando and Dawn version ==
"He Don't Love You (Like I Love You)"

Single by Tony Orlando and Dawn

from the album He Don't Love You, Like I Love You
- B-side: "Pick It Up"
- Released: March 1975
- Genre: Soft rock
- Length: 3:29
- Label: Elektra
- Songwriters: Jerry Butler, Calvin Carter, Curtis Mayfield
- Producers: Dave Appell, Hank Medress

Tony Orlando and Dawn singles chronology
| "You Say the Sweetest Things" (1974) | "He Don't Love You (Like I Love You)" (1975) | "You're All I Need to Get By" (1975) |

When Orlando and the other members of Dawn (Telma Hopkins and Joyce Vincent Wilson) were waiting in the lobby to go on at a Golden Globes award ceremony, Orlando spoke with Faye Dunaway and her then-husband, Peter Wolf, lead singer for The J. Geils Band. To pass the time, the two began singing various R&B songs from the '60s, including Butler's "He Will Break Your Heart", which the couple recommended that the group record on an upcoming album. Orlando contacted Mayfield requesting permission to do a remake, but to change the song's title to the opening lines, and Mayfield gave his permission. Billboard ranked it as the No. 19 song for 1975.

Their version topped the Billboard Hot 100 chart on May 3, 1975, and remained there for three weeks. The song also went to No. 1 on the US adult contemporary chart for one week in 1975. It was later certified gold by the RIAA. It marked the group's third and last chart-topper on the Billboard Hot 100 chart.

Another track from the same 1975 album was adapted from an Italian hit by Giorgio Gaber from two years prior, entitled "Far Finta di Essere Sani", recorded in English as "Tomorrow's Got to be Sunny".

== Charts ==
=== Weekly charts ===
| Chart (1975) | Peak position |
|---|---|
| Australia (Kent Music Report) | 33 |
| Canada RPM Top Singles | 4 |
| Canada RPM Adult Contemporary | 3 |
| New Zealand (Listener) | 28 |
| US Billboard Hot 100 | 1 |
| US Billboard Adult Contemporary | 1 |
| US Cash Box Top 100 | 1 |

=== Year-end charts ===
| Chart (1975) | Rank |
|---|---|
| Canada | 36 |
| US Billboard Hot 100 | 19 |
| US Cash Box Top 100 | 65 |

== Subsequent versions ==
During the 1960s the song was covered by Margie Singleton, Lulu ("She Will Break Your Heart"), Billy Fury, Bobby Vee, Lloyd Price, Ben E. King, The Merseybeats, Johnny Rivers (title "He Don't Love You, Like I Love You"), Jackie Edwards, among others.

The band Gallery included a version of the song under the name "He Will Break Your Heart" on their 1972 album Nice To Be With You.

Jim Croce included a version of the song as part of his "Chain Gang Medley" (along with Sam Cooke's "Chain Gang", and The Coasters "Searchin'") recorded before his death in 1973, it featured on the 1975 album The Faces I've Been and was a chart success as a single in 1976.

The Greg Kihn Band included a version of the song on their 1976 album, Greg Kihn.

The Walker Brothers also covered the track on their 1975 comeback album No Regrets under the original title "He Will Break Your Heart".

Dolly Parton covered the song in 1984, retaining the Orlando and Dawn retitling, though changing the gender to "She Don't Love You", like Margie Singleton did in 1960 to the original "He Will Break Your Heart" song. She included the song on The Great Pretender, an album of covers of early rock and roll hits.

Joe Tex made an answer song singing from the perspective of the other man entitled "I Will Never Break Your Heart".
