= Irwin Levine =

American songwriter

Irwin Jesse Levine (March 23, 1938 – January 21, 1997) was an American songwriter, who co-wrote the song "Tie a Yellow Ribbon Round the Ole Oak Tree" with L. Russell Brown. The song was a worldwide hit for Tony Orlando and Dawn as it reached number one on both the US and UK charts for four weeks in April 1973 and number one on the Australian charts for seven weeks from May to July 1973. It was the top-selling single in 1973 in both the US and UK. In 2008, Billboard ranked the song as the 37th biggest song of all time in its issue celebrating the 50th anniversary of the Hot 100.

== Songwriting Credits ==
Other songs written or co-written by Levine include:

- "This Diamond Ring" - Gary Lewis and the Playboys
- "Black Pearl" - Checkmates, Ltd.
- I Woke Up In Love This Morning" - The Partridge Family
- "Say, Has Anybody Seen My Sweet Gypsy Rose" - Tony Orlando and Dawn
- "Knock Three Times" - Dawn
- "Candida" - Dawn
- "We're Free" - Beverly Bremers

== Death ==
Levine died at the age of 58, in Livingston, New Jersey in January 1997, from either heart or kidney failure.
