= L. Russell Brown =

American songwriter (born 1940)

- Born: Lawrence Russell Brown; June 29, 1940 (age 86); Newark, New Jersey, U.S.
- Genres: Traditional pop, rock and roll
- Occupation: Songwriter

Lawrence "Larry" Russell Brown (born June 29, 1940), known as L. Russell Brown, is an American lyricist and composer. He is most noted for his songs, co-written with Irwin Levine, "Tie a Yellow Ribbon Round the Ole Oak Tree" and "Knock Three Times"—international hits for the 1970s pop music group Tony Orlando and Dawn. He also co-wrote "C'mon Marianne" for The Four Seasons, and "I Woke Up In Love This Morning" for The Partridge Family in 1971.

== Biography ==
Born in Newark, New Jersey, Brown began his songwriting career when he was sixteen with the R&B label Fury Records. Co-writing with Ray Bloodworth in the mid-1960s, and working for Bob Crewe, he wrote the hits "C'mon Marianne" and "Watch the Flowers Grow" for the Four Seasons. "C'mon Marianne" featured in Jersey Boys, the Broadway musical. With Crewe, Brown also wrote "Sock It to Me Baby!", a 1967 hit for Mitch Ryder and the Detroit Wheels.

Brown started writing with Irwin Levine in 1970, and found success with several hits for the singing group Tony Orlando and Dawn, including "Knock Three Times", "Tie a Yellow Ribbon Round the Ole Oak Tree" - both songs reaching #1 in the US and UK – and "Say, Has Anybody Seen My Sweet Gypsy Rose". "Tie a Yellow Ribbon Round the Ole Oak Tree" appears in such films as Wallace and Gromitt, Fargo, and Forrest Gump, and has reputedly been recorded over one thousand times. One of Brown's later successes as a writer was "Use It Up and Wear It Out", co-written with Sandy Linzer, which was a #1 hit in the UK for Odyssey in 1980.

Other musicians who have recorded his songs include Frank Sinatra, Bing Crosby, Perry Como, Lesley Gore, Ray Conniff, Johnny Mathis, and Donny Osmond.

== Copyright lawsuit ==
A copyright lawsuit against Dua Lipa by songwriters Brown and Sandy Linzer "claimed that Levitating infringed on their 1979 disco song Wiggle and Giggle All Night".
