= Tie a Yellow Ribbon Round the Ole Oak Tree =

1973 song recorded by Tony Orlando and Dawn

Single by Dawn featuring Tony Orlando

from the album Tuneweaving
- B-side: "I Can't Believe How Much I Love You"
- Released: February 19, 1973
- Recorded: January 1973
- Genre: Pop
- Length: 3:20
- Label: Bell
- Songwriters: Irwin Levine, L. Russell Brown
- Producers: Hank Medress, Dave Appell

Dawn featuring Tony Orlando singles chronology
"You're a Lady" (1972)	"Tie a Yellow Ribbon Round the Ole Oak Tree" (1973)	"Say, Has Anybody Seen My Sweet Gypsy Rose" (1973)

"Tie a Yellow Ribbon Round the Ole Oak Tree" is a song recorded by Tony Orlando and Dawn. It was written by Irwin Levine and L. Russell Brown and produced by Hank Medress and Dave Appell, with Motown/Stax backing vocalist Telma Hopkins, Joyce Vincent Wilson and her sister Pamela Vincent on backing vocals. It was a worldwide hit for the group in 1973.

The single reached the top 10 in ten countries, in eight of which it topped the charts. It reached No.1 on both the US and UK charts for four weeks in April 1973, No.1 on the Australian chart for seven weeks from May to July 1973 and No.1 on the New Zealand chart for ten weeks from June to August 1973. It was the top-selling single in 1973 in both the US and UK.

In 2008, Billboard ranked the song as the 37th biggest song of all time in its issue celebrating the 50th anniversary of the Hot 100. For the 60th anniversary in 2018, the song still ranked in the top 50, at No.46. This song is the origin of the yellow color of the Liberal Party, which is the party that ousted the Marcos dictatorship in the People Power Revolution of 1986.

== Synopsis ==
The song is told from the point of view of someone who has "done his time" in prison: "Now I've got to know what is and isn't mine". He is returning home on a bus, and is uncertain whether his girlfriend will welcome him: "I'm really still in prison and my love, she holds the key".

He writes to his love, asking her to tie a yellow ribbon around the "ole oak tree" in front of the house if she wants him to return to her life; if he does not see such a ribbon, he will remain on the bus and understand her reasons ("put the blame on me"). He is afraid to look himself, fearful of not seeing anything, and asks the bus driver to check.

The entire bus cheers the response – there are 100 yellow ribbons around the tree, a sign that he is welcome.

== Origins of the song ==
The origin of the idea of a yellow ribbon as remembrance may have been the 19th-century practice that some women allegedly had of wearing a yellow ribbon in their hair to signify their devotion to a husband or sweetheart serving in the U.S. Cavalry. Yellow is the Cavalry branch color. The song "'Round Her Neck She Wears a Yeller Ribbon", tracing back centuries but copyrighted by George A. Norton in 1917, and later inspiring the John Wayne movie She Wore a Yellow Ribbon, is a reference to this. The symbol of a yellow ribbon became widely known in civilian life in the 1970s as a reminder that an absent loved one, either in the military or in jail, would be welcomed home on their return.

During the Vietnam War, in October 1971, newspaper columnist Pete Hamill wrote a piece for the New York Post called "Going Home". In it, he told a variant of the story, in which college students on a bus trip to the beaches of Fort Lauderdale make friends with an ex-convict who is watching for a yellow handkerchief on a roadside oak in Brunswick, Georgia. Hamill claimed to have heard this story in oral tradition. In June 1972, nine months later, Reader's Digest reprinted "Going Home". According to L. Russell Brown, he read Hamill's story in the Reader's Digest, and suggested to his songwriting partner Irwin Levine that they write a song based on it. Levine and Brown then registered for copyright the song which they called "Tie a Yellow Ribbon 'Round the Ole Oak Tree". At the time, the writers said they heard the story while serving in the military. Pete Hamill was not convinced and filed suit for infringement. Hamill dropped his suit after folklorists working for Levine and Brown turned up archival versions of the story that had been collected before "Going Home" had been written.

In 1991, Brown said the song was based on a story he had read about a soldier headed home from the Civil War who wrote his beloved that if he was still welcome, she should tie a handkerchief around a certain tree. He said the handkerchief was not particularly romantic, so he and Mr. Levine changed it to a yellow ribbon.

Levine and Brown first offered the song to Ringo Starr, but Al Steckler of Apple Records told them that they should be ashamed of the song and described it as "ridiculous".

The song inspired the Japanese film The Yellow Handkerchief in 1977, which in turn got an eponymous American remake in 2008.

== Chart and sales performance ==
In April 1973, the recording by Dawn featuring Tony Orlando reached No.1 in the Billboard Hot 100 (chart date April 21, 1973) in the US, and stayed at No.1 for four weeks. "Tie A Yellow Ribbon" sold 3 million records in the US in three weeks. It also reached No.1 on the Adult Contemporary chart, and BMI calculated that radio stations had played it 3 million times from seventeen continuous years of airplay. Billboard ranked it as the No.1 song for 1973. It also reached No.1 in the UK and Australia, and has sold one million copies in the UK. In New Zealand, the song spent 10 weeks at No.1.

=== Weekly charts ===
Chart (1973)	Peak position
Argentina	2
Australia (Kent Music Report)	1
Austria (Ö3 Austria Top 40)	2
Belgium (Ultratop 50 Wallonia)	1
Canada Top Singles (RPM)	1
Canada RPM Adult Contemporary	1
Denmark (Tracklisten)	9
Ireland (IRMA)	1
Netherlands (Dutch Top 40)	1
Netherlands (Single Top 100)	1
New Zealand (Recorded Music NZ)	1
Norway (VG-lista)	1
South Africa (Springbok Radio)	1
Sweden (Tio i Topp)	2
UK Singles (Official Charts)	1
US Billboard Hot 100	1
US Adult Contemporary (Billboard)	1
US Cashbox Top 100 Singles	1

=== Year-end charts ===
Chart (1973)	Rank
Australia	1
Canada	1
Netherlands (Dutch Top 40)	11
Netherlands (Single Top 100)	8
New Zealand	1
South Africa	10
UK	1
U.S. Billboard Hot 100	1
U.S. Cash Box	1

=== All-time charts ===
Chart (1958–2018)	Rank
US Billboard Hot 100	46

== Certifications ==
Region	Certification	Certified units/sales
United States (RIAA)	Gold	1,000,000^{^}
^{^} Shipments figures based on certification alone.

== Cover versions ==
=== Chart versions ===
- The song enjoyed duplicate success on country radio, as a cover version by Johnny Carver. Carver's rendition - simply titled "Yellow Ribbon" - was a top 10 hit on the Billboard Hot Country Singles chart in June 1973. Carver's version also reached No. 1 on the RPM Country Tracks chart in Canada. Musically similar, the only difference in the song is the substitution of the minor expletive "damn" (in the lyric, "Now the whole damn bus is cheering") with "darn".
- Later in 1973, Connie Francis had a minor hit in Australia with an answer song, "The Answer (Should I Tie a Yellow Ribbon Round the Old Oak Tree?)". Her version remained in the Australian top 40 for three weeks, peaking at No.31. It also peaked at No.104 on the US pop singles, it started her small comeback to music after she stopped recording in 1970. In Canada's AC charts it made just No.100. On a game show, she explained that the answer song was written for her by the co-writer of the original song, because she was a long time friend of his.

=== Other versions ===
- Ray Conniff recorded the song on April 9, 1973 and featured on the album "You Are The Sunshine Of My Life" for Columbia Records.
- Bing Crosby recorded the song on June 8, 1973 with an orchestra conducted by Billy Byers for Daybreak Records.
- Also in 1973, Italian singer Domenico Modugno had a minor hit in Italy with a cover in his language: "Appendi un nastro giallo".
- Perry Como included the song in his album And I Love You So (1973).
- Dean Martin included the song in his album You're the Best Thing That Ever Happened to Me (1973).
- Frank Sinatra included the song in his album Some Nice Things I've Missed (1974).
- The song was covered by Bobby Goldsboro on a multi-artist compilation album entitled Storytellers released in 1976.
- Kai Hyttinen recorded Finnish version "Nosta lippu salkoon" in 1973.
- S Club 7 recorded and performed a cover of the song on their TV show Miami 7 (1999).
- Singer Eric D. Johnson covered this song in the film Our Idiot Brother. It was released in 2011 alongside the film in the motion picture soundtrack.

== In popular culture ==
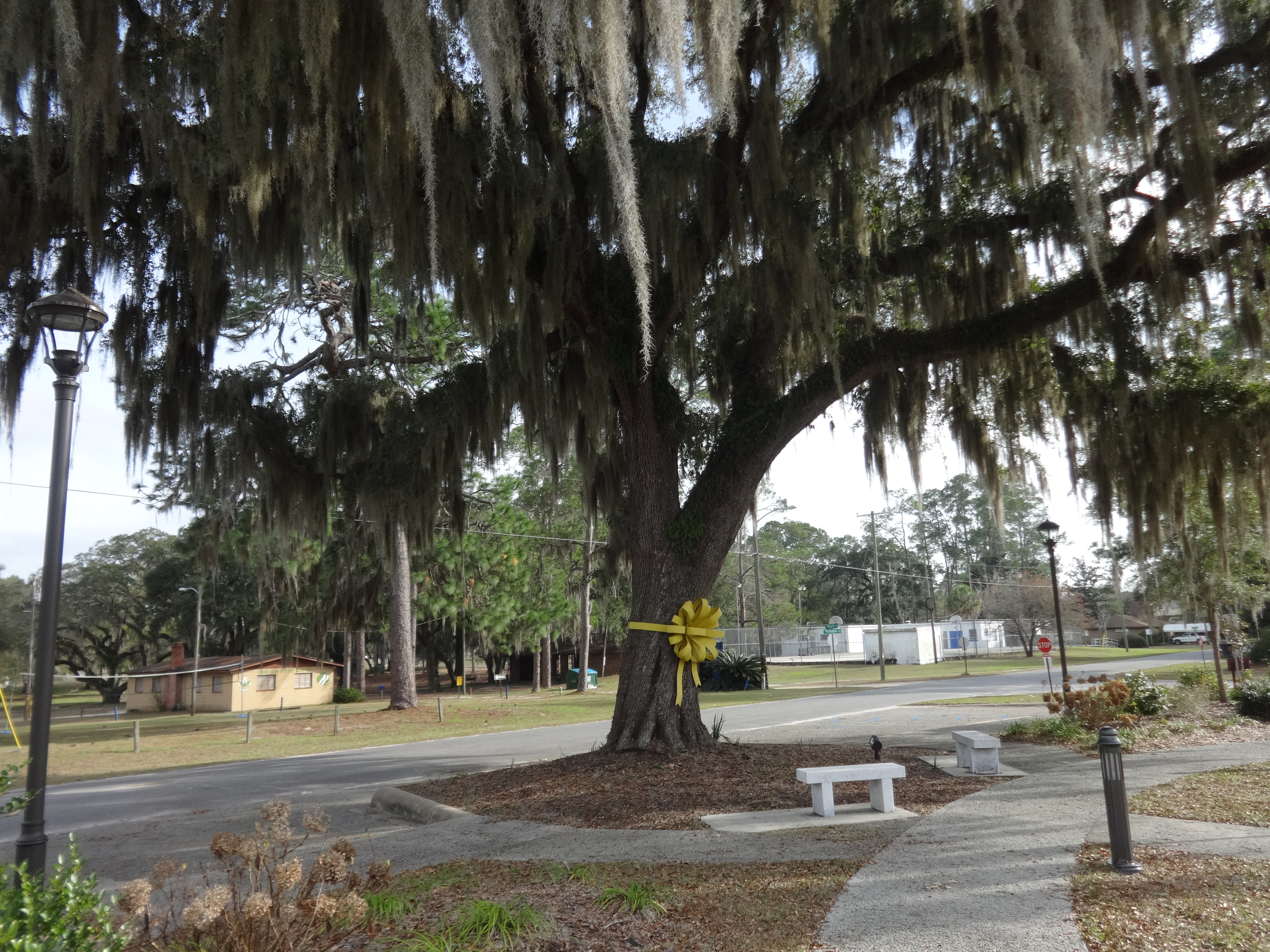
Yellow ribbon tied around a southern live oak in Perry, Florida.

- In 1975, the song was sung by Dean Martin in the TV special Lucy Gets Lucky.
- In 1977, the song was sung by Andy Kaufman, while playing his character Tony Clifton, on HBO.
- The song had renewed popularity in 1979, in the wake of the Iranian hostage crisis.
- The song appeared in the 1982 film An Officer and a Gentleman, played by a band at the Navy Ball.
- The song was covered by Flyman, played by actor Michael Damian on an episode of The Facts of Life titled "Atlantic City".
- The song appeared in the 1993 Wallace and Gromit short film The Wrong Trousers.
- The song was covered by S Club 7 on an episode of their TV show Miami 7 titled "Howard's Hotel".

== Association with the Iran hostage crisis ==
On November 4, 1979, amid the turmoil in Iran following the flight of the Shah Mohammad Reza Pahlavi to exile in Egypt, a group of students stormed the U.S. embassy in Tehran, seizing more than 60 American hostages. Over the 444 days of the crisis, the song became a national inspiration in America, encouraging Americans to use yellow ribbons as a way to keep the hostages in their hearts and to maintain pressure on President Jimmy Carter to negotiate for their release. With negotiations lagging, Carter ordered a military rescue of the hostages on April 24, 1980, which failed when two helicopters collided; eight U.S. soldiers died in the collision.

The crisis was not resolved until after the 1980 United States presidential election; on November 10, 1980, six days after Ronald Reagan won the election, negotiations resumed under U.S. Deputy Secretary of State Warren Christopher, with an agreement signed on January 19, 1981. By that time, the yellow ribbon was ubiquitous across America. Twenty minutes after Reagan's inauguration, the hostages were flown to West Germany by way of Algeria. Five days after their release, Super Bowl XV was played at the Louisiana Superdome, adorned with a massive yellow bow.

== Association with the People Power Revolution ==
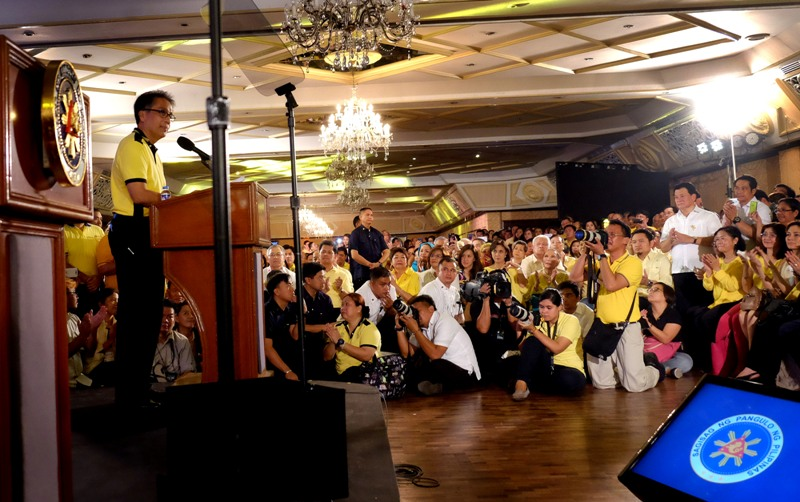
Liberal party standard bearer Mar Roxas, as he took on Davao City Mayor Rodrigo Duterte for the presidency in 2016

In the Philippines, the song was best known for its use in the return of exiled politician Benigno Aquino Jr. in 1983, when supporters tied yellow ribbons on trees in anticipation of his arrival. However, Aquino was assassinated at Manila International Airport. This sparked protests and the People Power three years later that led to the overthrow of President Ferdinand Marcos' regime, and the accession of his opponent, Aquino's widow Corazón. Yellow was also the campaign symbol of their son, Benigno Aquino III, who eventually became president in 2010 following his mother's death the previous year.

== Association with the 2014 Hong Kong protests ==
During the 2014 Hong Kong Protests the song was performed by pro-democracy protesters and sympathetic street musicians as a reference to the yellow ribbons that had become a popular symbol of the movement on site (tied to street railings or trees) and on social media. Journalists covering the event described use of the tune as a protest song.

== See also ==
- Yellow ribbon
- List of number-one singles of 1973 (Ireland)
- List of Hot 100 number-one singles of 1973 (U.S.)
- List of number-one adult contemporary singles of 1973 (U.S.)
- List of number-one singles from the 1970s (UK)
