= Hank Medress =

American singer and record producer (1938–2007)

Background information
- Born: Henry Medress; November 19, 1938; Brooklyn, New York, United States
- Died: June 18, 2007 (aged 68) Manhattan, New York, United States
- Occupations: Singer, record producer

Henry "Hank" Medress (November 19, 1938 – June 18, 2007) was an American singer and record producer, best known for his taking part in the American band The Tokens.

== Biography ==
Medress was born in Brooklyn, New York City, where he attended "Abraham Lincoln" High School. In 1955 he joined a doo-wop group called the Linc-Tones, from the surname of that President of the United States, which also included at first Neil Sedaka. After Sedaka's departure, the group reformed with additional singers as The Tokens in 1958, after several changes of name. The Tokens achieved a #1 chart success in 1961 with their arrangement of "The Lion Sleeps Tonight", a remake of the 1939 song "Mbube" by South African singer Solomon Linda. Medress and the Tokens also produced hits for The Chiffons, such as "He's So Fine".

After leaving the Tokens, Medress co-produced (with Dave Appell) many of Tony Orlando and Dawn's hits as well as Melissa Manchester's LP. Later, he worked with Frankie Valli, David Johansen, Rick Springfield, Dan Hill, and Richard Simmons. He was also president of EMI Music Publishing Canada from 1990 to 1992. Medress produced the Dan Hill song, "Never Thought (That I Could Love)" in 1987, which was a #43 hit on the Billboard Hot 100 and a #2 hit on the Billboard Adult Contemporary chart.

After returning to New York, Medress became a partner in Bottom Line Records, which released recordings of performances at The Bottom Line club in Greenwich Village, as well as new work by emerging artists. In recent years, Medress had worked as a consultant for SoundExchange, an agency that collects royalties from digital broadcasters, like satellite and Internet radio.

== Death ==
Medress died of lung cancer at his Manhattan home on June 18, 2007, aged 68.
