= Tony Orlando and Dawn =

American pop group

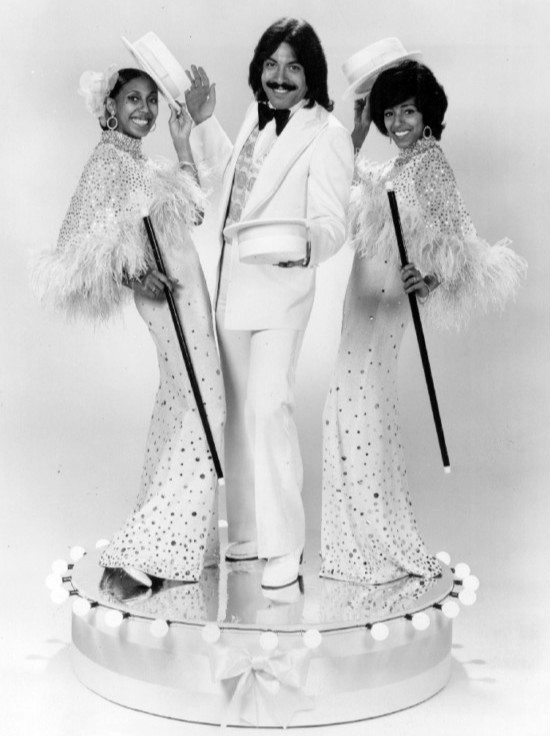
- Telma Hopkins, Tony Orlando and Joyce Vincent Wilson at the premiere of their television show, 1974

Background information
- Also known as: Dawn; Dawn featuring Tony Orlando
- Origin: New York City, U.S.
- Genre: Pop
- Years active: 1970–1977, 1988–1993, 2005, 2015–2016, 2018–2024
- Labels: Bell, Elektra
- Members: Tony Orlando; Telma Hopkins; Joyce Vincent; Pamela Vincent (touring)

Tony Orlando and Dawn (also known simply as Dawn) is an American pop music group that was popular in the 1970s, composed of singer Tony Orlando and the backing vocal group Dawn (Telma Hopkins and Joyce Vincent Wilson). Their signature hits include "Candida", "Knock Three Times", "Tie a Yellow Ribbon Round the Ole Oak Tree", "Say, Has Anybody Seen My Sweet Gypsy Rose", and "He Don't Love You (Like I Love You)".

== Early history ==
Tony Orlando was born Michael Anthony Orlando Cassavitis on April 3, 1944. Orlando recorded through the 1960s with only moderate chart success. He had three Top 40 hits, two in 1961 and another in 1969 as the lead singer for the studio group Wind. While recording through the 1960s, he also became a producer and a successful music executive with Columbia Records and April/Blackwood music.

While working as a music executive, Orlando received "Candida", a song other producers and singers had turned down. Originally, Orlando could not lend his name to the song, as he was working for April-Blackwood and recording under his name would be a professional conflict of interest. After producer Hank Medress insisted Orlando dub his voice over the male vocals on the original track, Bell Records released the single as being performed by the band "Dawn" to protect Orlando's position. On the American Top 40 radio episode for the week ending October 3, 1970, host Casey Kasem stated that the lead singer of Dawn was Frankie Spinelli; obviously this alias was used to further obscure Tony Orlando's true identity as the lead singer on "Candida". Four weeks later, on the American Top 40 episode for the week ending October 31, 1970, Casey Kasem stated that four guys make up Dawn: Frank, Ricky, Jim, and Dave, amplified on the episode for the week ending November 7, 1970, as Frank Spinale (or Paris), Ricky Chanin, Jim Gregory, and Dave Lavender.

The background singers on the track were Cynthia Weil, Linda November, Jay Siegel, and Toni Wine, who co-wrote the song. Phil Margo played drums on the original session, and the arranger was Norman Bergen. After the single hit No. 3 on the Billboard Hot 100 (No.1 on the Cashbox Top 100), Orlando wanted to perform again. The ensemble recorded the 1970 album Candida, which included the namesake song and the No. 1 hit song "Knock Three Times". Kasem identified Dawn as an eight-member group from Philadelphia, on the American Top 40 radio episode for the week ending January 23, 1971, far from the truth about the musicians on the record, then repeated the Philadelphia misidentification on the episode for the week ending May 8, 1971.

Bell Records was desperate to have a real-life act to promote Dawn's records. Orlando asked former Motown/Stax backing vocalists Telma Hopkins and Joyce Vincent Wilson, whom he had hired to work as background vocalists while producing Barry Manilow in the late 1960s, to become Dawn. The threesome then went on the road in 1971, on the success of "Candida" and "Knock Three Times". After a tour of Europe, Hopkins and Vincent assumed background vocal duties in the studio, first recording on the late 1971 album Dawn Featuring Tony Orlando. The first single with their voices in the background was "Runaway/Happy Together" in 1972.

The group (now billed as 'Dawn featuring Tony Orlando') released another single in 1973, and it became their next No. 1 single — "Tie a Yellow Ribbon 'Round the Ole Oak Tree." In terms of sales, this single was the most successful in the group's career, starting a string of eleven consecutive Hot 100 appearances by the group.

On The Carol Burnett Show in 1975, Harvey Korman, Carol Burnett, and Vicki Lawrence performed a spoof of Tony Orlando and Dawn, as Tony Tallahassee and Dusk, singing "Wrap Your Jammies Round the Old White Pine". At the end of the number, they were kicked off the stage by the real Tony Orlando and Dawn. Earlier, Lawrence's "The Night the Lights Went Out in Georgia" had immediately preceded Dawn's "Tie a Yellow Ribbon Round the Ole Oak Tree" at the top position of the Hot 100 in April 1973.

== Period of group's variety show ==
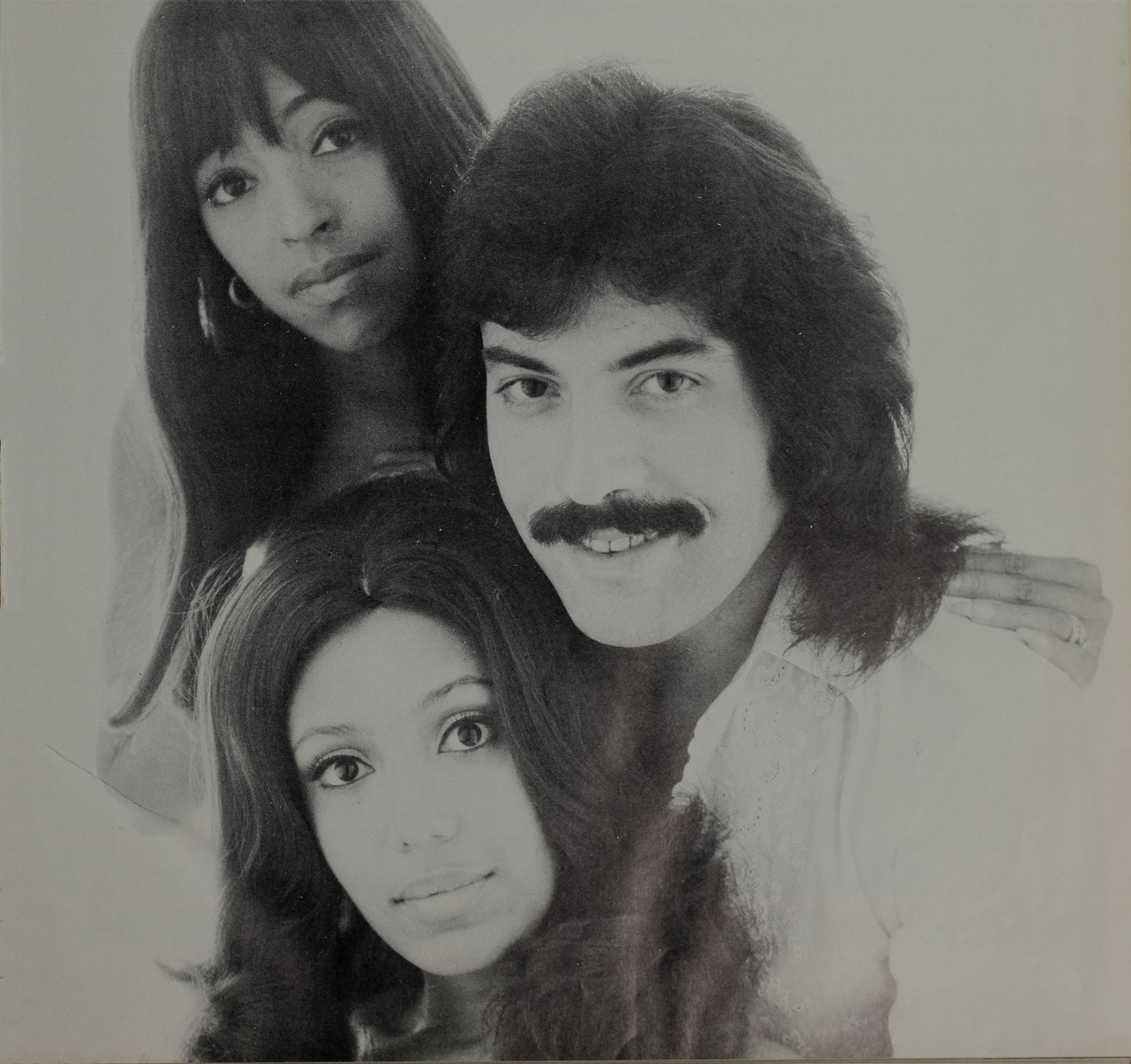
Tony Orlando and Dawn on the cover of Cash Box; January 5, 1974

The group's next single, "Say, Has Anybody Seen My Sweet Gypsy Rose" (from their concept album Dawn's New Ragtime Follies), went to No. 3 on the Hot 100, followed by Top 40 hits "Who's In The Strawberry Patch With Sally" (the first single with recording credit "Tony Orlando & Dawn") (No. 27), "Steppin' Out (Gonna Boogie Tonight)" (No.7), and, with some disco influence, Dennis Lambert and Brian Potter's "Look in My Eyes Pretty Woman" (from the trio's 1974 album Prime Time) (No.11).

CBS gave the group a television variety show (entitled Tony Orlando and Dawn) from the summer of 1974, after The Sonny & Cher Comedy Hour ended its run, until December 1976. The show was in the same vein as its predecessor (with sketches featuring sarcastic back-and-forth banter between Orlando, Hopkins and Vincent, similar to the sarcastic dialogue between Sonny and Cher) and became a Top 20 hit.

With a new record label (Elektra), the group continued their string of hit singles during the show's run, hitting #1 on both the Hot 100 and the adult contemporary charts with "He Don't Love You (Like I Love You)" (a reworking of Jerry Butler's "He Will Break Your Heart"), from the album of the same title, and "Mornin' Beautiful" (#14). In 1975 "You're All I Need to Get By", followed in 1976 by "Cupid", both from their final original album To Be with You, became the group's last two Top 40 singles on the Hot 100. "Sing" reached No. 7 on the Adult Contemporary Chart in 1977. The group went their separate ways later that year and would have only one more single, 1991's "With Ev'ry Yellow Ribbon (That's Why We Tie 'Em)".

== Later career ==
They re-formed in 1988 for a five-week tour that wound up lasting into 1993, with Vincent's sister Pamela Vincent stepping in whenever Hopkins was fulfilling her acting/television obligations.

Until 2024, Orlando was still a popular appearance performer on tour regularly with The Lefty Brothers and Toni Wine. Hopkins made a very successful acting career for herself in series such as Bosom Buddies, Gimme a Break, Family Matters, Half & Half, and Are We There Yet?

The Vincent sisters continue a career as session singers. A DVD compilation from the variety series was released in 2005 along with the group's catalog of albums on CD. Tony Orlando & Dawn released A Christmas Reunion that same year. Publicity events for those releases marked the first time Hopkins and both Vincent sisters appeared onstage together. Toni Wine also participated in those shows. The group was inducted into the Vocal Group Hall of Fame in 2008. In 2009, Joyce Vincent joined Scherrie Payne and Lynda Laurence's Former Ladies of the Supremes' group.

Tony Orlando, Telma Hopkins, and Joyce Vincent reunited again in 2015 for the sold-out "Tony Orlando and Dawn: To Be with You Again" tour and appeared at Chiller Theatre in Parsippany, NJ, and again for a successful Christmas tour in late-2018. Telma Hopkins and Joyce Vincent joined Tony Orlando on stage at his final (retirement) concert on March 22, 2024 at Mohegan Sun Arena in Uncasville, Connecticut.

== Discography ==
- Candida (November 1970)
- Dawn Featuring Tony Orlando (November 1971)
- Tuneweaving (March 1973)
- Dawn's New Ragtime Follies (September 1973)
- Prime Time (November 1974)
- He Don't Love You (Like I Love You) (April 1975)
- Skybird (October 1975)
- To Be With You (February 1976)
- Christmas Reunion (November 2005)

== See also ==
- Tony Orlando and Dawn (TV series)
