= Billy "Crash" Craddock discography =

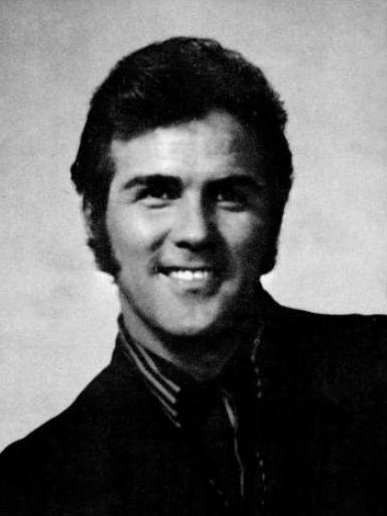
- Craddock in 1971
- Studio albums: 19
- Live albums: 3
- Compilation albums: 15
- Singles: 65
- Music videos: 2
- No. 1 Singles: 10

The discography for country singer Billy "Crash" Craddock consists of nineteen studio albums, three live albums, fifteen compilation albums and sixty-five singles.

== Studio albums ==
=== 1960s–1970s ===
Title	Details	Peak positions
Title	Details	US Country
I'm Tore Up	Release date: 1964; Label: King Records	—
Knock Three Times	Release date: 1971; Label: Cartwheel Records	18
You Better Move On	Release date: 1972; Label: Cartwheel Records	37
Two Sides of "Crash"	Release date: 1973; Label: ABC Records	29
Mr. Country Rock	Release date: 1973; Label: ABC Records	20
Rub It In (Note: Rub It In also peaked at number 142 on the Billboard 200 and at number 95 in Australia.)	Release date: 1974; Label: ABC Records	6
Still Thinkin' 'bout You	Release date: 1975; Label: ABC/Dot Records	11
Easy as Pie	Release date: 1976; Label: ABC/Dot Records	8
Crash	Release date: 1976; Label: ABC/Dot Records	8
Singing Is Believing	Release date: 1978; Label: BCC Records	—
Billy "Crash" Craddock	Release date: 1978; Label: Capitol Records	14
Turning Up and Turning On (Note: Turning Up and Turning On also peaked at number 24 on the RPM Country Albums chart in Canada.)	Release date: 1978; Label: Capitol Records	20
Laughing and Crying, Living and Dying	Release date: 1979; Label: Capitol Records	—
"—" denotes releases that did not chart

=== 1980s–2000s ===
Title	Details	Peak positions
Title	Details	US Country
Changes	Release date: 1980; Label: Capitol Records	71
Crash Craddock	Release date: 1981; Label: Capitol Records	—
The New Will Never Wear Off of You	Release date: 1982; Label: Capitol Records	—
Crash Craddock	Release date: 1986; Label: MCA/Dot Records	—
Back on Track	Release date: 1989; Label: Atlantic Records	—
Christmas Favorites	Release date: 2006; Label: Cee Cee Records	—
"—" denotes releases that did not chart

== Live albums ==
Title	Details	Peak positions
Title	Details	US Country
Live!	Release date: 1977; Label: ABC/Dot Records	11
Crash Craddock Live!	Release date: 1985; Label: Cee Cee Records	—
Live -n- Kickin'	Release date: 2009; Label: Cee Cee Records	—
"—" denotes releases that did not chart

== Compilation albums ==
Title	Details	Peak positions
Title	Details	US Country
The Best of Billy "Crash" Craddock	Release date: 1973; Label: Chart Records	50
Billy "Crash" Craddock	Release date: 1973; Label: Harmony Records	—
Greatest Hits Volume One	Release date: 1974; Label: ABC Records	21
Billy "Crash" Craddock 16 Favorite Hits	Release date: 1977; Label: Starday Records	—
The First Time	Release date: 1977; Label: ABC/Dot Records	37
Sings His Greatest Hits	Release date: 1978; Label: ABC/Dot Records	30
The Best of Billy "Crash" Craddock	Release date: 1982; Label: MCA Records	—
Greatest Hits	Release date: 1983; Label: Capitol Records	—
Crash's Greatest Hits	Release date: 1986; Label: Colonial Records	—
Boom Boom Baby	Release date: 1992; Label: Bear Family Records	—
Crash's Smashes	Release date: 1996; Label: Razor & Tie	—
The Best of Billy "Crash" Craddock	Release date: 2013; Label: MCA Nashville	—
Mr. Country Rock: The Definitive Collection	Release date: 2016; Label: Hump Head Country	—
25 Best	Release date: March 21, 2018; Label: A.IM Media	—
Boom Boom Billy - The Rock 'N' Roll Years	Release date: April 12, 2019; Label: Jasmine Music	—
"—" denotes releases that did not chart

== Singles ==
=== 1950s ===
Year	Single	Peak positions	Album
Year	Single	US	Album
1957	"Smacky-Mouth"	—	—N/a
1957	"Birddoggin'"	—	—N/a
1958	"Ah, Poor Little Baby"	—	—N/a
1959	"Am I to Be the One"	—	—N/a
1959	"Sweetie Pie"	—	—N/a
1959	"Don't Destroy Me"	94	—N/a
"—" denotes releases that did not chart

=== 1960s ===
Year	Single	Peak positions	Album
Year	Single	AUS	Album
1960	"Boom Boom Baby"	1	—N/a
1960	"I Want That"	7	—N/a
1960	"Well, Don't You Know"	8	—N/a
1960	"All I Want Is You"	91	—N/a
1960	"One Last Kiss"	1	—N/a
1960	"Blabbermouth"	—	—N/a
1961	"Heavenly Love" / "Good Time Billy" (Double A-Side)	64	—N/a
1961	"Truly True"	90	—N/a
1962	"A Diamond Is Forever"	—	—N/a
1964	"Betty, Betty"	—	I'm Tore Up
1964	"My Baby's Got Flat Feet"	—	I'm Tore Up
1964	"Teardrops on Your Letter"	—	I'm Tore Up
1966	"There Ought to Be a Law"	—	—N/a
1967	"Whipping Boy"	—	—N/a
1967	"Go on Home Girl"	—	—N/a
1968	"Your Love Is What Is"	—	—N/a
"—" denotes releases that did not chart

=== 1970s ===
Year	Single	Peak chart positions						Album
Year	Single	US Country	US	CAN Country	CAN	CAN AC	AUS	Album
1971	"Knock Three Times"	3	113	21	—	—	—	Knock Three Times
1971	"Dream Lover"	5	—	—	—	—	—	You Better Move On
1971	"You Better Move On"	10	—	—	—	—	—	You Better Move On
1972	"Your Love Is What Is"	—	—	—	—	—	—	—N/a
1972	"Nothin' Shakin' (But the Leaves on the Trees)"	10	—	1	—	—	—	Two Sides of "Crash"
1972	"I'm Gonna Knock on Your Door"	5	—	1	—	—	—	Two Sides of "Crash"
1972	"Afraid I'll Want to Love Her One More Time"	22	—	19	—	—	—	Two Sides of "Crash"
1973	"Don't Be Angry"	33	—	22	—	—	—	Two Sides of "Crash"
1973	"Slippin' and Slidin'"	14	—	13	—	—	—	Mr. Country Rock
1973	"'Till the Water Stops Runnin'"	8	—	18	—	—	—	Mr. Country Rock
1973	"Sweet Magnolia Blossom"	3	—	1	—	—	—	Mr. Country Rock
1974	"Rub It In"	1	16	1	18	—	50	Rub It In
1974	"Ruby Baby"	1	33	2	78	45	—	Rub It In
1975	"Still Thinkin' 'bout You"	4	—	1	—	—	—	Still Thinkin' 'bout You
1975	"I Love the Blues and the Boogie Woogie"	10	—	6	—	—	—	Still Thinkin' 'bout You
1975	"Easy as Pie"	2	54	1	81	50	—	Easy as Pie
1976	"Walk Softly"	7	—	4	—	—	—	Easy as Pie
1976	"You Rubbed It in All Wrong"	4	—	4	—	—	—	Easy as Pie
1976	"Broken Down in Tiny Pieces"	1	—	2	—	—	—	Crash
1977	"Just a Little Thing"	28	—	21	—	—	—	Crash
1977	"A Tear Fell"	7	—	4	—	—	—	Crash
1977	"The First Time"	10	—	15	—	—	—	The First Time
1978	"I Cheated on a Good Woman's Love"	4	—	4	—	—	—	Billy "Crash" Craddock
1978	"Another Woman"	92	—	—	—	—	—	Crash
1978	"I Think I'll Go Somewhere (And Cry Myself to Sleep)"	50	—	—	—	—	—	Crash
1978	"I've Been Too Long Lonely Baby"	28	—	28	—	—	—	Billy "Crash" Craddock
1978	"Don Juan"	57	—	—	—	—	—	Crash
1978	"Hubba Hubba"	14	—	14	—	—	—	Turning Up and Turning On
1978	"If I Could Write a Song as Beautiful as You"	4	—	8	—	—	—	Turning Up and Turning On
1979	"My Mama Never Heard Me Sing"	28	—	24	—	—	—	Laughing and Crying, Living and Dying
1979	"Robinhood"	16	—	34	—	—	—	Laughing and Crying, Living and Dying
1979	"Till I Stop Shakin'"	24	—	44	—	—	—	Laughing and Crying, Living and Dying
"—" denotes releases that did not chart

=== 1980s ===
Year	Single	Peak chart positions		Album
Year	Single	US Country	CAN Country	Album
1980	"I Just Had You on My Mind"	22	—	Changes
1980	"Sea Cruise"	50	—	Changes
1980	"A Real Cowboy (You Say You're)"	20	17	Crash Craddock
1981	"It Was You"	37	—	Crash Craddock
1981	"I Just Need You for Tonight"	11	20	The New Will Never Wear Off of You
1981	"Now That the Feelings Gone"	38	—	Changes
1982	"Love Busted"	28	—	The New Will Never Wear Off of You
1982	"The New Will Never Wear Off of You"	62	—	The New Will Never Wear Off of You
1983	"Tell Me When I'm Hot"	86	—	—N/a
1989	"Just Another Miserable Day (Here in Paradise)"	68	—	Back on Track
1989	"To Love Somebody"	—	91	Back on Track
"—" denotes releases that did not chart

== Music videos ==
Year	Video	Director
1989	"Just Another Miserable Day (Here in Paradise)"	Jason Furrate/Doug Smoot
