= Crash's Smashes =

Crash's Smashes: The Hits of Billy "Crash" Craddock

Compilation album by Billy "Crash" Craddock
- Released: 1996
- Recorded: 1971–1981
- Genre: Country
- Label: Razor & Tie

Billy "Crash" Craddock chronology
Boom Boom Baby (1992)	Crash's Smashes: The Hits of Billy "Crash" Craddock (1996)	Billy "Crash" Craddock's Christmas Favorites (2006)

Crash's Smashes: The Hits of Billy "Crash" Craddock is a greatest hits album by country singer Billy "Crash" Craddock. It was released in 1996 on the Razor & Tie label.

== Track listing ==
1. "Knock Three Times" (L. Russell Brown, Irwin Levine)
2. "Dream Lover" (Bobby Darin)
3. "You Better Move On" (Arthur Alexander)
4. "Ain't Nothin' Shakin' (But the Leaves on the Trees)" (Eddie Fontaine, Diane Lampert, Cirino Colacrai, K. Zanchi)
5. "I'm Gonna Knock on Your Door" (Aaron Schroeder, Sid Wayne)
6. "'Til The Water Stops Runnin'" (L. Russell Brown)
7. "Sweet Magnolia Blossom" (Rory Michael Bourke)
8. "Rub It In" (Layng Martine Jr.)
9. "Ruby Baby" (Jerry Leiber, Mike Stoller)
10. "Still Thinkin' 'bout You" (Johnny Christopher)
11. "I Love the Blues and the Boogie Woogie" (Darrell Statler)
12. "Easy as Pie" (Rory Michael Bourke, J. Wilson)
13. "Walk Softly" (Van McCoy)
14. "You Rubbed It in All Wrong"
15. "Broken Down in Tiny Pieces" (John Adrian)
16. "A Tear Fell" (Dorian Burton, Eugene Randolph)
17. "The First Time"
18. "I Cheated on a Good Woman's Love"
19. "If I Could Write a Song as Beautiful as You"
