= The Best of Billy "Crash" Craddock (1982 album) =

Greatest hits album by Billy "Crash" Craddock
- Released: 1982
- Genre: Country
- Label: MCA

Billy "Crash" Craddock chronology
Crash Craddock (1981)	The Best of Billy "Crash" Craddock (1982)	The New Will Never Wear Off Of You (1982)

The Best of Billy "Crash" Craddock is a greatest hits collection by country singer Billy "Crash" Craddock. It was released in 1982 on MCA Records. It consisted of two vinyl records.

== Track listing ==
=== Record 1 ===
1. Rub It In
2. Broken Down in Tiny Pieces
3. You Better Move On
4. The First Time
5. Sweet Magnolia Blossom
6. Easy As Pie
7. Still Thinkin' 'bout You
8. Ain't Nothin' Shakin'
9. Don't Be Angry
10. Slippin' And Slidin'

=== Record 2 ===
1. Knock Three Times
2. Dream Lover
3. I'm Gonna Knock On Your Door
4. Walk Softly
5. I Love The Blues and the Boogie
6. Ruby Baby
7. A Tear Fell
8. 'Till The Water Stops Runnin'
9. Afraid I'll Want To Love Her One More Time
10. You Rubbed It in All Wrong
