= Rub It In (Layng Martine Jr. song) =

Single by Billy "Crash" Craddock

from the album Rub It In
- B-side: "It's Hard to Love a Hungry, Worried Man"
- Released: June 1974
- Recorded: 1974
- Genre: Country
- Length: 2:30
- Label: ABC
- Songwriter: Layng Martine Jr.
- Producer: Ron Chancey

Billy "Crash" Craddock singles chronology
"Sweet Magnolia Blossom" (1973)	"Rub It In" (1974)	"Ruby Baby" (1974)

"Rub It In" is a song written and originally recorded by Layng Martine Jr., and credited as Layng Martine. His version, released on the Barnaby Records label, was produced by Ray Stevens and was a U.S. chart single in the fall of 1971, reaching number 65.

Billy "Crash" Craddock recorded the song three years later on the album Rub It In, taking it to Number One on the country music charts and Top 20 on the pop charts in 1974. He told Tom Roland in The Billboard Book of Number One Country Hits that many stations refused to play it at first because they thought it was risque. "I said, 'We're talking about suntan lotion, and if you still think it's risque, then don't play it,'" Craddock said. "Evidently, they all went back and listened to it, and it was the biggest record we ever had." Craddock also made live recordings of the song on 1977's Live! and 2009's Live -N- Kickin'.

Craddock eventually recorded a sequel to the song, “You Rubbed It In All Wrong,” which borrows heavily from the original song's melody but instead replaces the lotion with sand, as the man's lover is discovered to be cheating on him. The sequel was also a top-5 hit on both the country charts.

A third version, in 1999 by country singer Matt King also charted on the country charts, from his album Hard Country. In the 1980s, the song's “rub it in, rub it in” lyric and melody were used in ads for Absorbine Jr., a topical muscle relief product. Later, the song's melody was adapted by Glade to advertise their plug-in air fresheners ("plug it in, plug it in").

== Chart performance ==
=== Layng Martine ===
Chart (1971)	Peak position
Australia (Kent Music Report)	88
U.S. Billboard Hot 100	65
U.S. Billboard Easy Listening	36

=== Billy "Crash" Craddock ===
Chart (1974)	Peak position
Australian (Kent Music Report)	50
Canadian RPM Country Tracks	1
Canadian RPM Top Singles	18
South Africa (Springbok)	8
US Hot Country Songs (Billboard)	1
US Billboard Hot 100	16
US Billboard Easy Listening	15

=== Matt King ===
Chart (1999)	Peak position
US Hot Country Songs (Billboard)	54
