= Billy "Crash" Craddock Sings His Greatest Hits =

Sings His Greatest Hits

Greatest hits album by Billy "Crash" Craddock
- Released: 1978
- Genre: Country
- Label: ABC

Billy "Crash" Craddock chronology
Billy "Crash" Craddock (1978)	Sings His Greatest Hits (1978)	Turning Up And Turning On (1978)

Sings His Greatest Hits is a greatest hits collection by country singer Billy "Crash" Craddock. It was released in 1978 on ABC Records as AB-1078. It was reissued as MCA Records 663 in 1981. The album was re-released again on cassette only in 1995. The album has been called "a good summation of his peak years."

== Track listing ==
1. Rub It In
2. Broken Down in Tiny Pieces
3. Another Woman
4. There Won't Be Another Now
5. Ruby Baby
6. Think I'll Go Somewhere (And Cry Myself To Sleep)
7. Why Don't We Sleep On It
8. Easy As Pie
9. Knock Three Times
10. Walk Softly
11. Still Thinkin' 'bout You
12. Don Juan
