= Greatest Hits Volume One (Billy "Crash" Craddock album) =

Greatest hits album by Billy "Crash" Craddock
- Released: 1974
- Recorded: 1971–1973
- Genre: Country
- Label: ABC
- Producer: Ron Chancey

Billy "Crash" Craddock chronology
Rub It In (1974)	Greatest Hits Volume One (1974)	Still Thinkin' 'bout You (1975)

Greatest Hits Volume One is a greatest hits album by Billy "Crash" Craddock. It was released in 1974 on ABC Records. It was produced by Ron Chancey.

== Track listing ==
1. "Knock Three Times"
2. "Dream Lover"
3. "Don't Be Angry"
4. "Slippin' and Slidin'"
5. "'Till The Water Stops Runnin'"
6. "Sweet Magnolia Blossom"
7. "You Better Move On"
8. "Afraid I'll Want To Love Her One More Time"
9. "I'm Gonna Knock On Your Door"
10. "Ain't Nothin' Shakin'"

== See also ==
- Billy "Crash" Craddock discography
