= First Time =

First Time or The First Time may refer to:

== Film and television ==
=== Films ===
- The First Time (1952 film), an American comedy-drama directed by Frank Tashlin
- The First Time (1969 film), an American coming-of-age film directed by James Neilson
- The First Time (1981 film), an American coming of age comedy film
- The First Time, a 1982 American television film starring Jennifer Jason Leigh
- First Time, a 1983 Hong Kong film produced by Peter Yang
- The First Time, a 1983 comedy featuring Wendie Jo Sperber
- First Time, a 2003 Philippine film featuring Ryan Eigenmann
- The First Time (2012 film), an American teen romantic comedy by Jon Kasdan
- First Time (2012 film), a Chinese romance film directed by Han Yan

=== Television ===
- First Time (TV series), a 2010 Philippine romantic drama

==== Episodes ====
- "First Time" (South of Nowhere)
- "The First Time" (Glee)
- "The First Time" (One Day at a Time)
- "The First Time" (That '70s Show)

== Literature ==
- The First Time (memoir), a 1998 book by Cher and Jeff Coplon
- First Time, a 2008 novel by Meg Tilly
- First-Time: The Historical Vision of an Afro-American People, a 1983 book by Richard Price

== Music ==
=== Albums ===
- First Time (Maya Simantov album) or the title song, 2005
- First Time (Morning Musume album), 1998
- First Time! The Count Meets the Duke, by Count Basie and Duke Ellington, 1961
- First Time (EP), by Liam Payne, or the title song, 2018
- The First Time (Kelsea Ballerini album) or the title song (see below), 2015
- The First Time (The Kid Laroi album), 2023
- First Time, by Jackie Chan, 1992
- First Time, by the Piper Downs, 1995
- The First Time, by Billy "Crash" Craddock, 1977
- The First Time, by The Kid Laroi, 2023

=== Songs ===
- "1st Time", by Yung Joc, 2006
- "1st Time", by Bakar, 2020
- "First Time" (Ai song), 2022
- "First Time" (Carly Rae Jepsen song), 2016
- "First Time" (Jebediah song), 2004
- "First Time" (Jonas Brothers song), 2013
- "First Time" (The Kelly Family song), 1995
- "First Time" (Kygo and Ellie Goulding song), 2017
- "First Time" (Lifehouse song), 2007
- "First Time" (M-22 song), 2017
- "First Time" (Robin Beck song), 1988
- "First Time" (Vance Joy song), 2014
- "The First Time" (Damon Boyd vs. Mondo Rock song), 2004
- "The First Time" (Freddie Hart song), 1975
- "The First Time" (Matt Fishel song), 2011
- "The First Time" (Surface song), 1990
- "First Time", by Andy Grammer from Naive, 2019
- "First Time", by BoDeans from Still, 2008
- "First Time", by Boys Like Girls from Crazy World, 2012
- "First Time", by Daya, 2020
- "First Time", by Fabolous from From Nothin' to Somethin', 2007
- "First Time", by Finger Eleven from The Greyest of Blue Skies, 2000
- "First Time", by Grey, 2019
- "First Time", by Illenium and Iann Dior, 2021
- "First Time", by IMx from IMx, 2001
- "First Time", by Jaheim from Appreciation Day, 2013
- "First Time", by Jesse Ware from Glasshouse, 2017
- "First Time", by Michael Sembello from Bossa Nova Hotel, 1983
- "First Time", by Nas from King's Disease III, 2022
- "First Time", by Nicole Scherzinger from Big Fat Lie, 2014
- "First Time", by Red Velvet from The Velvet, 2016
- "First Time", by Styx from Cornerstone, 1979
- "First Time", by Twice from Taste of Love, 2021
- "The First Time", by Adam Faith, 1963
- "The First Time", by Billy "Crash" Craddock from Easy as Pie, 1976
- "The First Time", by Blink-182 from Nine, 2019
- "The First Time", by Damiano David from Funny Little Fears, 2025
- "The First Time", by Kelsea Ballerini from Kelsea Ballerini, 2014
- "The First Time", by U2 from Zooropa, 1993

== See also ==
- For the First Time (disambiguation)
- The First Time Ever I Saw Your Face (disambiguation)
