= Live! (Billy "Crash" Craddock album) =

Live album by Billy "Crash" Craddock
- Released: 1977
- Recorded: 1977
- Genre: Country
- Label: ABC/Dot Records

Billy "Crash" Craddock chronology
Crash (1976)	Live! (1977)	The First Time (1977)

Live! is an album by Billy "Crash" Craddock. It was released in 1977 on ABC/Dot Records. It was recorded at the Ivanhoe Theatre in Chicago, Illinois.

== Track listing ==
1. Introduction
2. Promised Land
3. Ruby Baby
4. Walk Softly
5. Rock & Medley
6. Rock and Roll Music
7. Blueberry Hill
8. Your Momma Don't Dance
9. All I Have To Do Is Dream
10. Wake Up Little Suzie
11. Elvis Dialogue
12. Hound Dog
13. Easy as Pie
14. Broken Down in Tiny Pieces
15. Encore
16. Encore
17. Rub It In
18. A Tear Fell
19. Whole Lotta Shakin' Goin On
20. Blue Suede Shoes
