= Easy as Pie =

Easy as Pie may refer to:

- Easy as Pie (Billy "Crash" Craddock album), 1976
  - "Easy as Pie" (song), the title song from the album
- "Easy as Pie", a song by R&B duo Peaches & Herb from their 1978 album 2 Hot
- Easy as Pie (Gary Burton album), 1981
- Easy as Pie (Dexter), an episode of the American television series Dexter
- As easy as pie, an expression used to describe a task or experience as pleasurable and simple
