= The Best of Billy "Crash" Craddock =

The Best of Billy "Crash" Craddock is the name of two albums:

- The Best of Billy "Crash" Craddock (1973 album)
- The Best of Billy "Crash" Craddock (1982 album)
