= Kaintuck =

Kaintuck may refer to:

- Kaintuck, a Kentucky frontiersman on the Natchez Trace
- Kaintuck (film), a 1912 film by Reliance Film Company
- Kaintuck' (Still), a 1935 symphonic poem
- Kaintuck Hollow a valley in Missouri
- Kaintuck Territory, a theme park
