= Billy "Crash" Craddock (1973 album) =

Greatest hits album by Billy "Crash" Craddock
- Released: 1973
- Recorded: 1958–1960
- Genre: Country
- Label: Harmony

Billy "Crash" Craddock chronology
| The Best of Billy "Crash" Craddock (1973) | Billy "Crash" Craddock (1973) | Mr. Country Rock (1973) |

Billy "Crash" Craddock is a greatest hits collection of rockabilly (later country) singer Billy "Crash" Craddock. The album includes songs originally released in the late 1950s and early 1960s on Columbia Records. The album was released in 1973 on the Harmony label.

== Track listing ==
1. "One Last Kiss"
2. "Heavenly Love"
3. "Don't Destroy Me"
4. "Boom Boom Baby"
5. "Am I to Be the One (For the Last Time)"
6. "I Miss You So Much"
7. "I Want That"
8. "Sweetie Pie"
9. "All I Want Is You"
10. "Letter of Love"
