= You Better Move On =

You Better Move On may refer to:

- You Better Move On (album), by Billy Craddock, 1972
- "You Better Move On" (song), originally recorded by Arthur Alexander, 1961
