= Crash Craddock Live! =

Live album by Billy "Crash" Craddock
- Released: 1985
- Genre: Country
- Label: Cee Cee

Billy "Crash" Craddock chronology
| Greatest Hits (1983) | Crash Craddock Live! (1985) | Crash Craddock (1986) |

Crash Craddock Live! is a live album released by Billy "Crash" Craddock. It was released on the singer's own Cee Cee label in 1985. The album was recorded at the Little Nashville Opry in Nashville, Indiana.

== Track listing ==
1. Introduction
2. It'll Be Me
3. Ruby Baby
4. Easy As Pie
5. Knock Three Times
6. Rock & Roll Medley
7. Why Me Lord
8. Darlin
9. There Goes My Everything
10. This Time
11. Rub It In
12. Old Time Rock & Roll
