= For the Last Time =

For the Last Time may refer to:

== Music ==
- For the Last Time: Live from the Astrodome, a 2003 live album by the American country music singer George Strait (recorded in 2002)
- "For the Last Time", a 2019 song by the Australian singer and songwriter Dean Lewis from the album A Place We Knew

== Television ==
- For the Last Time (TV series), a British television series with two episodes, one released in 2010 and one in 2011

== See also ==
- For the First Time (disambiguation)
- The Last Time (disambiguation)
