= Candida (song) =

- Sleeve artwork with fictional group, not the actual performers

Single by Dawn

from the album Candida
- B-side: "Look At..."
- Released: July 1970
- Genre: Pop; rock
- Length: 3:02
- Label: Bell Records
- Songwriters: Toni Wine; Irwin Levine
- Producers: Hank Medress; Dave Appell

Dawn singles chronology
"Candida" (1970)	"Knock Three Times" (1971)

"Candida" is the debut single by American pop music group Dawn, with vocals by Tony Orlando, released in July 1970. The song, written by Irwin Levine and Toni Wine, was produced by Dave Appell and Hank Medress for Bell Records. Appell and Medress originally recorded another singer on the track, but decided that a different vocal approach would be preferable. Medress then approached Orlando to do the vocals. Orlando had been a professional singer in the early 1960s, but now worked as a music publishing manager for Columbia Records. Although initially worried about losing his job at Columbia, Orlando eventually agreed to lend his voice to the track.

"Candida" became a worldwide hit, reaching number one in five countries, and the top ten in many others, including number 3 in the USA. It was included on Dawn's debut LP in 1970 and later appeared on several compilation albums. Andy Williams, Jesse Winchester, Ray Conniff, and Bernd Spier are among the artists who have covered the song.

== Background and recording ==
In 1970 Hank Medress of the Tokens and Dave Appell were producing a song called "Candida" for Bell Records. The composition was written by Toni Wine and Irwin Levine. For the first recording of the song, the lead vocal was done by blues singer Frankie Paris, in a style reminiscent of the Drifters. Paris's performance was deemed unsatisfactory, and a new singer was sought for the track. Medress believed that "an ethnic feel" would suit the song well. He asked his friend Tony Orlando, whose heritage is Puerto Rican and Greek, to perform its lead vocal.

"Candida"
Producer Hank Medress aimed for "an ethnic feel" for "Candida", which has "a lilting, sing-along groove".

Orlando, a former professional singer, had two top-40 hits in the US in 1961, but later moved into the music publishing business; in 1967 Columbia Records chose him to manage their publishing division, April-Blackwood Music. When Medress approached Orlando, he was reluctant to perform on a Bell Records single, as he did not want to jeopardize his job at Columbia. Medress reassured him by saying they would use a band name for the release, and that nobody would know who the singer was. Orlando finally agreed, partly because he believed the song would be unsuccessful and would not attract any attention. He went into a studio with Appell and Medress, and sang his lead vocal over previously recorded tracks. Background vocals had been done by Wine and the Tokens' Jay Siegel; Orlando was not present when these were recorded. By different accounts, additional background singers may have included Ellie Greenwich, Robin Grean, Leslie Miller, and Linda November. (Note: Still other sources attribute the background vocals to Telma Hopkins and Joyce Vincent Wilson (see Hoffman 2004, p. 789; Bronson 2003; Ankeny), who were members of Dawn from some point in the early 1970s onwards (see Huey). However, in his autobiography, Orlando recounts recruiting Hopkins and Wilson for the group after "Candida" and its follow-up single, "Knock Three Times", were recorded and released (Orlando 2003, pp. 95–100).) Tokens drummer Phil Margo and Siegel played instruments on at least one of the versions of the song. The music of Orlando's version has been described as having "a lilting, sing-along groove".

== Release ==
"Candida" was released as a single in July 1970 under the moniker Dawn, named after the daughter of either Jay Siegel or Bell Records executive Steve Wax. The single reached number one in Brazil, Malaysia, Singapore, Spain, and Sweden, and the top ten in Austria, Canada, Denmark, Mexico, New Zealand, Norway, South Africa, the UK, and the USA. It also reached the top twenty in Australia, Belgium, and Germany. Billboard ranked the record as the No. 18 song of 1970.

Jay Warner, author of American Singing Groups: A History from 1940 to Today, notes that the group the Corporation released a different version of "Candida" around the same time as Dawn's. The Corporation's recording was produced by Bill and Steve James, and released on Musicor Records. Warner believes that this version was based on an early, slower piano-and-vocals demo by Toni Wine. A July 1970 capsule review in Billboard magazine of both Dawn's and the Corporation's versions categorized the latter's recording as possessing "a strong blues and Tex-Mex flavor", and stated that both singles had "equal sales and chart potential". However, although for a short while it seemed there might be competition between the two, the Corporation's single did not sell well.

Dawn's version was released on their debut album, Candida, in 1970, and later on the Dawn compilations Greatest Hits, The World of Tony Orlando & Dawn, The Definitive Collection, and The Big Hits. It has also appeared on various-artists compilations including Today's Super Hits, AM Gold: 1970, and Real 70's: the Polyester Hits, Disc One.

== Covers ==
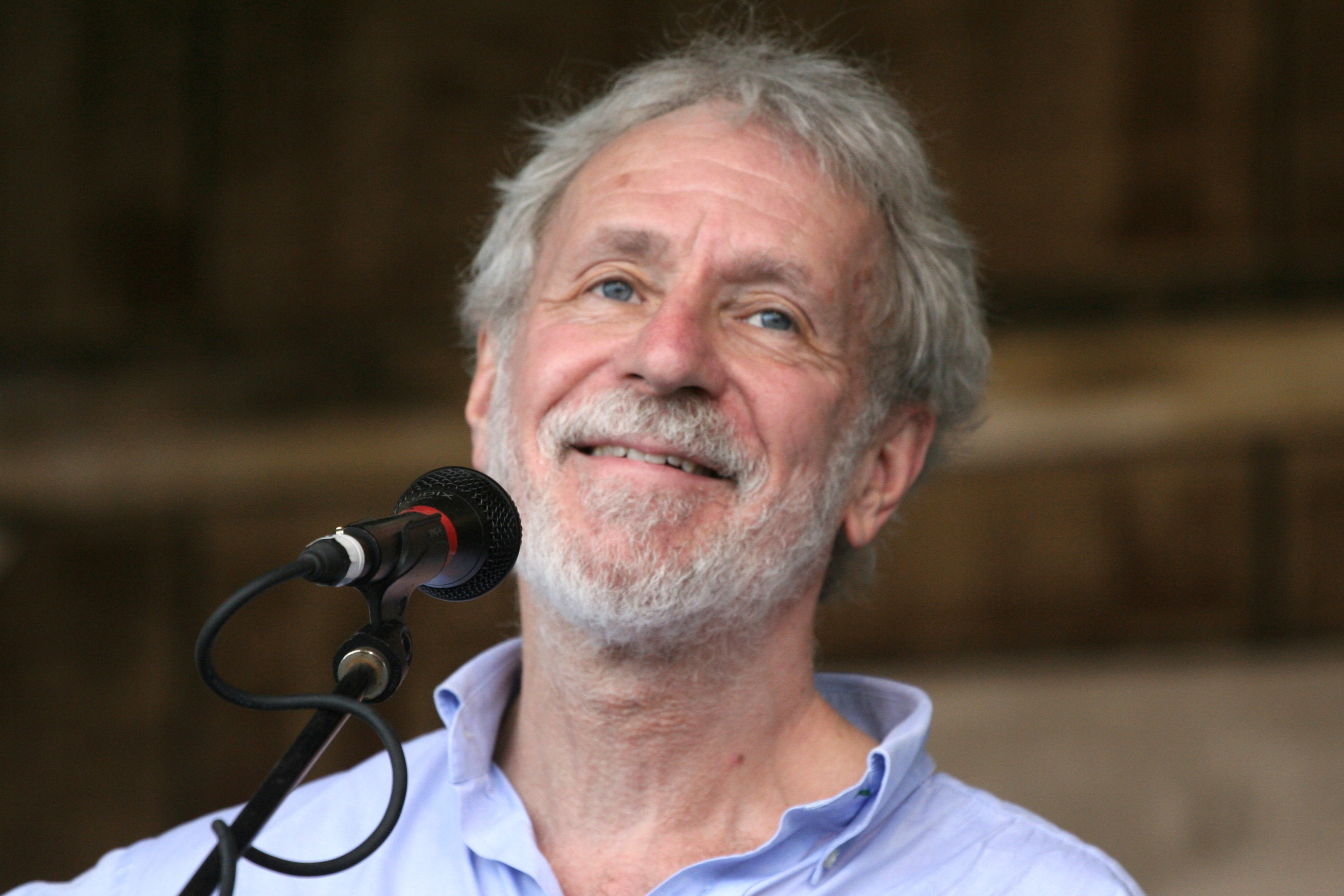
Jesse Winchester is one of many singers who have covered "Candida".

Numerous musicians have covered "Candida", among them Andy Williams, Jesse Winchester, Jimmy Velvet, Ray Conniff, and reggae artists Owen Gray and the Pioneers. Foreign-language versions have included recordings in Portuguese by the Fevers, in Spanish by La Tropa Loca, and in German by Bata Illic and Bernd Spier.

== Charts ==
=== Weekly charts ===
Chart (1970)	Peak position
Argentinian Charts	1
Australian Charts	13
Belgian Charts	11
Brazilian Charts (Rio de Janeiro)	1
Canadian RPM Top Singles	2
Canada RPM Adult Contemporary	11
German Charts	18
Malaysian Charts	1
New Zealand (Listener)	2
Norwegian Charts	4
Singaporean Charts	1
South Africa (Springbok Radio)	3
Spanish Charts	1
Swedish Charts	1
UK Singles Chart	9
US Billboard Hot 100	3
US Billboard Easy Listening	8
US Cash Box Top 100	1

=== Year-end charts ===
Chart (1970)	Rank
Canada RPM	25
US Billboard	18
US Cash Box Top 100	24

== Certifications ==
Region	Certification	Certified units/sales
New Zealand (RMNZ)	Gold	15,000^{‡}
^{‡} Sales+streaming figures based on certification alone.
