= Santa Looked a Lot Like Daddy =

Single by Buck Owens

from the album Christmas with Buck Owens
- B-side: "All I Want for Christmas, Dear, Is You"
- Released: November 8, 1965
- Genre: Country; Christmas
- Length: 2:13
- Label: Capitol
- Songwriter(s): Buck Owens, Don Rich
- Producer(s): Ken Nelson

Buck Owens singles chronology
"Buckaroo" (1965)	"Santa Looked a Lot Like Daddy" (1965)	"Waitin' in Your Welfare Line" (1966)

"Santa Looked a Lot Like Daddy" is a Christmas song co-written and recorded by Buck Owens. After its recording in 1965, the song has been covered by several country music artists, including Garth Brooks, Travis Tritt, and Brad Paisley.

== History ==
The song was released on November 8, 1965, with "All I Want for Christmas, Dear, Is You" on the B-side. It placed at number 2 on the yearly Christmas singles chart issued by Billboard at the time.

The song is about a child who has sneaked downstairs to catch a glimpse of Santa where the child sees his father in a Santa costume.

== Cover versions ==
In 1992, Garth Brooks covered the song on his Christmas album Beyond the Season, produced by Allen Reynolds for Liberty Records. However, it did not chart from Christmas airplay until January 1998, when it reached number 56. The physical single release had "The Old Man's Back in Town", with which Brooks charted at number 48 on the same chart in 1992, on the B-side.

Also in 1992, Travis Tritt covered both the single and its B-side for his Christmas album A Travis Tritt Christmas: Loving Time of the Year.

In 1995, The Tractors included a cover on their album Have Yourself a Tractors Christmas.

In 1998, Paul Brandt included a cover on his album A Paul Brandt Christmas: Shall I Play for You?

Psychobilly trio The Reverend Horton Heat recorded a cover for their 2005 album We Three Kings.

Brad Paisley covered it in 2006 for his Christmas album Brad Paisley Christmas on Arista Nashville under the production of Frank Rogers. Paisley's version peaked at number 49 on the country charts in January 2007.

Also in 2006, Billy "Crash" Craddock included a cover on his album Billy "Crash" Craddock's Christmas Favorites.

In 2011, rock band Bowling for Soup included a version of the song on their album Merry Flippin’ Christmas Vol. 1.

In 2013, the cast of Duck Dynasty released Duck the Halls: A Robertson Family Christmas. "Santa Looked a Lot Like Daddy" was included as a bonus track on the Walmart exclusive edition.

In 2023, Jon Pardi included a cover on his album Merry Christmas from Jon Pardi.

== Chart performance ==
=== Buck Owens ===
Chart (1965)	Peak position
US Christmas Songs (Billboard)	2

=== Garth Brooks ===
Chart (1998)	Peak position
US Hot Country Songs (Billboard)	56

=== Brad Paisley ===
Chart (2007)	Peak position
US Hot Country Songs (Billboard)	49
