= Knock Three Times (album) =

Studio album by Billy "Crash" Craddock
- Released: 1971
- Studio: Woodland (Nashville, Tennessee)
- Genre: Country
- Label: Cartwheel
- Producer: Ron Chancey

Billy "Crash" Craddock chronology
I'm Tore Up (1964)	Knock Three Times (1971)	You Better Move On (1971)

Knock Three Times is a country album by Billy "Crash" Craddock. It was released on Cartwheel Records in 1971. It was re-released in 1973 on ABC Records. The album featured Craddock's first top ten hit, "Knock Three Times".

== Track listing ==
1. "Knock Three Times" (Irwin Levine, L. Russell Brown) - 2:30
2. "Country Pride" (Dale Morris, J. Sahnger) - 2:58
3. "Hide and Seek" (Ethel Byrd, Paul Winley) - 2:11
4. "Confidence and Common Sense" (Durwood Haddock) - 2:45
5. "Home in Tennessee" (Conrad Pierce) - 2:10
6. "Mention My Name" (Ron Chancey) - 2:39
7. "Lonely Boy" (Paul Anka) - 2:26
8. "I Ran Out of Time" (Dale Morris) - 2:23
9. "Treat Her Right" (Roy Head) - 2:09
10. "The Best I Ever Had" (Dale Morris, Ron Chancey) - 2:50
