= Candida (album) =

Studio album by Dawn
- Released: 1970
- Genre: Pop
- Length: 30:11
- Label: Bell
- Producer: Hank Medress, Phil & Mitch Margo, Jay Siegel

Dawn chronology
Candida (1970)	Dawn featuring Tony Orlando (1971)

Professional ratings
Review scores
Source	Rating
Allmusic	3/5 stars

Candida is a 1970 album by Dawn, a studio session group including Tony Orlando, Toni Wine, and Linda November. Orlando was singing under the group name "Dawn" in order to avoid problems with his contract with his other label, CBS. However, after the success of the album tracks "Candida" and "Knock Three Times", he invited two other singers to become the real-life "Dawn", and then "Tony Orlando and Dawn" could tour in support of the songs.

== Track listing ==
No.	Title	Writer(s)	Length
1.	"Candida"	Irwin Levine, Toni Wine	3:05
2.	"Up on the Roof"	Gerry Goffin, Carole King	2:50
3.	"Country"	Ronny Amodea	2:29
4.	"Look At..."	Mitchell Margo, Phil Margo, Hank Medress, Jay Siegel	2:26
5.	"Rainy Day Man"	James Taylor	2:26
6.	"What Are You Doing Sunday"	Irwin Levine, Toni Wine	2:33
7.	"Knock Three Times"	L. Russell Brown, Irwin Levine	2:59
8.	"Carolina in My Mind"	James Taylor	2:30
9.	"Let's Run Away Girl"	Dave Appell, Lawrence Negro	2:33
10.	"The Love in Your Eyes"	Mitchell Margo, Phil Margo, Hank Medress, Jay Siegel	3:18
11.	"Perhaps the Joy of Giving"	Mitchell Margo, Phil Margo, Hank Medress, Jay Siegel	0:34
12.	"Home"	Mitchell Margo, Phil Margo, Hank Medress, Jay Siegel	2:26

== Charts ==
Chart (1971)	Peak position
Argentina Albums Chart	2
US Billboard Top LPs	35

=== 2005 CD edition ===
In 2005, a 35th-anniversary compilation was released featuring the original track listing plus nine bonus tracks. The bonus tracks are from the group's 1971 second album, Dawn Featuring Tony Orlando featuring What Are You Doing Sunday (Bell 6069), which was later reissued as Tony Orlando & Dawn II (Bell 1322) in 1974.

35th Anniversary Bonus Tracks
No.	Title	Producer(s)	Length
13.	"Carmen"	Brown, Levine	3:02
14.	"Get Out from Where We Are"	Ardith Polley	2:10
15.	"The Good Life"	Sacha Distel, Jack Reardon	2:10
16.	"I Didn't Mean to Love You So Good, Juanita"	Brown, Levine	3:20
17.	"Summer Sand"	Brown, Levine	2:57
18.	"I Get Ideas"	Dorcas Cochran, Julio Sanders	2:22
19.	"In the Park"	Polley	3:00
20.	"Sweet Soft Sounds of Love"	Polley	2:35
21.	"I Play and Sing"	Brown, Levine	2:21

== Production ==
- Arranged by Norman Bergen
- Produced by Hank Medress, Phil & Mitch Margo and Jay Siegel
- Engineered by Billy Radice
