= Duane Dee =

American singer-songwriter

Duane Dee is an American country singer known for his many guest appearances at the Grand Ole Opry and also for a series of minor hits on the country charts, sometimes with songs that went on to be major hits for other artists.

Born in Milwaukee, Wisconsin, Dee signed a contract with Capitol Records, and his second single was "Before the Next Teardrop Falls", which spent several months on the country charts before reaching #44 in early 1968. (In 1975 Freddy Fender's version topped the pop and country charts.) Later in 1968 Dee's original version of "True Love Travels on a Gravel Road" reached #58 on the country charts; Elvis Presley's 1969 version is probably now better known. Moving to Cartwheel Records, Dee had more minor country hits in 1971 with "I've Got to Sing" (#71) and "How Can You Mend a Broken Heart?" (#36; a country version of a #1 hit by The Bee Gees). In 1972 he recorded "Sweet Apple Wine" (#64). Moving to ABC Records, Dee had one more minor hit in 1974 with "Morning Girl" (#88).

Dee now lives in Bradenton, Florida.
