= Changes (Billy "Crash" Craddock album) =

Studio album by Billy "Crash" Craddock
- Released: 1980
- Genre: Country
- Label: Capitol

Billy "Crash" Craddock chronology
Laughing and Crying, Living and Dying (1979)	Changes (1980)	Crash Craddock (1981)

Changes is a country album by Billy "Crash" Craddock. It was released by Capitol Records in 1980.

== Track listing ==
No.	Title	Length
1.	"I Just Had You on My Mind"
2.	"She's Good to Me"
3.	"I'm Missing You"
4.	"Now That the Feeling's Gone"
5.	"For the Love of Yesterday"
6.	"She's Got Legs"
7.	"Sea Cruise"
8.	"Ain't No Easy Way to Lose"
9.	"Hold Me Tight"
10.	"You Just Want to Be Mine"

== Chart performance ==
Chart (1980)	Peak position
U.S. Billboard Top Country Albums	71
