= Boom Boom Baby =

Compilation album by Billy "Crash" Craddock
- Released: August 10, 1992
- Recorded: 1958–1961
- Genre: Rockabilly
- Label: Bear Family
- Producer: Don Law

Billy "Crash" Craddock chronology
Back on Track (1989)	Boom Boom Baby (1992)	Crash's Smashes (1996)

Boom Boom Baby is an album by Billy "Crash" Craddock. The songs were released in the late 1950s and early 1960s. The CD was released in 1992 on Bear Family Records. The only hit song in the United States was "Don't Destroy Me". The song reached No. 94 on the pop charts in November 1959. A few of the songs were hits in Australia. The songs "LuLu Lee" and "Ah, Poor Little Baby" were released on Date Records in 1958. The other tracks were released on Columbia Records in 1959-1961.

== Track listing ==
1. "Sweetie Pie"
2. "Lulu Lee"
3. "Ah, Poor Little Baby"
4. "I Miss You So Much"
5. "(For The Last Time) Am I to Be the One" (B.W. Stevenson, Otis Blackwell)
6. "Well Don't You Know" (George Weston)
7. "Boom Boom Baby" (Dave Burgess)
8. "(What Makes You) Treat Me Like You Do"
9. "I Want That" (Ben Weisman)
10. "Little Ole You"
11. "One Last Kiss" (Charles Strouse, Lee Adams)
12. "Report Card of Love"
13. "Heavenly Love"
14. "Good Time Billy (Is a Happiness Fool)" (Peter Udell)
15. "Letter of Love"
16. "Don't Destroy Me"
17. "Blabbermouth"
18. "School Day Dreams"
19. "Since She Turned Seventeen" (Wayne Walker, Marijohn Wilkin)
20. "All I Want Is You" (Jamie Chaleff)
21. "Is It True or False (That I'm in Love With You)"

== Personnel ==
- Billy "Crash" Craddock - guitar, vocals
- Harold Bradley - guitar
- Boots Randolph - saxophone
- Patrick Sullivan - guitar
- Grady Martin - guitar
- Wally Richardson - guitar
- Frank Carroll - bass
- Buddy Harman - drums
- Floyd Cramer - piano
- Jack Tysinger Jr. - drums
- Walter Garland - guitar
- Jack Parrish - guitar
- Hank Garland - guitar
- Joe Zinkan - bass
- Basil Henry Freeman Jr. - saxophone
- Howard Carpenter - violin
- Lillian Hunt - violin
- Douglas G. Kirkman - drums
- Bob Moore - bass
- Andrew L. Goodrich - saxophone
- A. Beasley Group - choir
- Brenton Banks - violin
- Solie Fott - violin

== Hits (In Australia) ==
Record	Year	Chart	Label
"Boom Boom Baby"	1960	1	Coronet Records
"Well, Don't You Know"	1960	1	Coronet Records
"One Last Kiss"	1961	1	Coronet Records
"Blabbermouth"	1961	3	Coronet Records
"Good Time Billy (Is a Happiness Fool)"	1961	16	Coronet Records

== See also ==
- List of number-one singles in Australia during the 1960s
