= Crash Craddock (1986 album) =

Studio album by Billy "Crash" Craddock
- Released: 1986
- Recorded: 1986
- Genre: Country
- Label: MCA/Dot Records
- Producer: Jimmy Johnson

Billy "Crash" Craddock chronology
| Crash Craddock Live! (1985) | Crash Craddock (1986) | Crash's Greatest Hits (1986) |

Crash Craddock is an album by Billy "Crash" Craddock. It was released in 1986 by MCA/Dot Records. It was recorded in Muscle Shoals, Alabama and produced by Jimmy Johnson.

== Track listing ==
1. Honey Don't
2. I Didn't Hear The Thunder
3. Only Then
4. Love Burn
5. Broken Down in Tiny Pieces
6. She Belongs To Me
7. All Night Blue
8. Whatcha Gonna Do
9. Three Times A Lady
10. For The Good Times

== Personnel ==
- Ava Aldridge - backing vocals
- Gary Baker - backing vocals
- Donny Carpenter - fiddle
- Cindy Greene - backing vocals
- Roger Hawkins - drums
- David Hood - bass guitar
- Clayton Ivey - piano
- Will McFarlane - guitar
- Steve Nathan - synthesizer
- Tom Rhoady - percussion
- Brent Rowan - guitar
- Cindy Walker - backing vocals
- Jerry Wallace - guitar
