= Greatest Hits (Billy "Crash" Craddock album) =

Greatest hits album by Billy "Crash" Craddock
- Released: 1983
- Genre: Country
- Label: Capitol

Billy "Crash" Craddock chronology
The New Will Never Wear Off Of You (1982)	Greatest Hits (1983)	Crash Craddock Live! (1985)

Greatest Hits is a greatest hits album by Billy "Crash" Craddock. It was released in 1983 on Capitol Records. It was released on CD in 1989.

== Track listing ==
1. Sea Cruise
2. Now That The Feeling's Gone
3. I Cheated On A Good Woman's Love
4. If I Could Write A Song As Beautiful As You
5. I Just Need You For Tonight
6. Till I Stop Shaking
7. My Mama Never Heard Me Sing
8. Hubba Hubba
9. I Just Had You On My Mind
10. Love Busted
