= Mr. Country Rock =

Studio album by Billy "Crash" Craddock
- Released: 1973
- Genre: Country
- Label: ABC
- Producer: Ron Chancey

Billy "Crash" Craddock chronology
Billy "Crash" Craddock (1973)	Mr. Country Rock (1973)	Rub It In (1974)

Singles from Mr. Country Rock
- 1. "Slippin' and Slidin'" Released: May 1973; 2. "Till the Water Stops Runnin" Released: August 1973; 3. "Sweet Magnolia Blossom" Released: December 1973

Professional ratings
Review scores
Source	Rating
Allmusic	4/5 stars

Mr. Country Rock is an album by the country singer Billy "Crash" Craddock. It was released in 1973 on ABC Records. The album included several hits including, "'Till The Water Stops Runnin'" and "Sweet Magnolia Blossom".

== Track listing ==
1. "'Till the Water Stops Runnin'"
2. "Honey Love"
3. "She's Mine"
4. "I'm in Love Again"
5. "Everybody Likes It"
6. "Slippin' and Slidin'"
7. "Holy Cow"
8. "Sweet Magnolia Blossom"
9. "Peggy Sue"
10. "Whole Lotta Shakin' Goin On"
