= Turning Up and Turning On =

Studio album by Billy "Crash" Craddock
- Released: 1978
- Genre: Country
- Label: Capitol

Billy "Crash" Craddock chronology
Sings His Greatest Hits (1978)	Turning Up and Turning On (1978)	Laughing and Crying, Living and Dying (1979)

Turning Up and Turning On is a country album by Billy "Crash" Craddock. It was released in 1978 on the Capitol label.

== Track listing ==
1. You Are Everything I Wanted You to Be
2. If I Could Write a Song As Beautiful As You (John Adrian) 3:26
3. Delilah
4. What Are Memories Made Of
5. Let's Go Back to the Beginning
6. Hubba Hubba
7. Rip It Up
8. Let the Good Times Roll
9. Lonely Weekends
10. Never Ending
