= Singing Is Believing =

Studio album by Billy "Crash" Craddock
- Released: 1978
- Genre: Country, gospel

Billy "Crash" Craddock chronology
The First Time (1977)	Singing Is Believing (1978)	Billy "Crash" Craddock (1978)

Singing Is Believing is a country/gospel album by Billy "Crash" Craddock. It was independently released in 1978. The album was produced by Billy "Crash" Craddock and Dale Morris.

== Track listing ==
1. Gone At Last
2. Family Bible
3. How Great Thou Art
4. Why Me Lord
5. The Old Rugged Cross
6. Will The Circle Be Unbroken
7. Where No One Stands Alone
8. Softly And Tenderly
9. Somebody Touched Me
10. Suppertime
11. Amazing Grace
