= True Love Travels on a Gravel Road =

Single by Duane Dee
- B-side: "Have a Little Faith"
- Released: November 1968
- Genre: Country music
- Length: 2:26
- Label: Capitol
- Songwriters: Dallas Frazier, A.L. Owens
- Producer: Kelso Herston

Duane Dee singles chronology
"We're the Kind of People (That Make the Jukebox Play)" (1968)	"True Love Travels on a Gravel Road" (1968)	"Blessed Are the Poor" (1969)

"True Love Travels on a Gravel Road" is a song written by the Frazier-Owens songwriting team and popularized by Elvis Presley. It was originally recorded by Duane Dee in 1968, and was a very minor hit, reaching #58 on the country charts. Elvis recorded the song on 17 February 1969 at American Sound Studios in Memphis. He also performed the song at the International Hotel in the Las Vegas Valley on January 26, 1970. It appears on From Elvis in Memphis, as well as a number of compilations; The Memphis Record, The Memphis 1969 Anthology: Suspicious Minds, and From Nashville to Memphis: The Essential '60s Masters.

== Cover versions ==
- A 1969 recording of the song by Percy Sledge enjoyed success as well. The version was released in November 1969. Esquire would later refer to it as "that rarely reprised Percy Sledge beauty "True Love Travels on a Gravel Road" [which] is no small blessing." The song is in key of C major with a progression from C to E minor, to F to G to C and is a mixture of country and gospel. Sledge, however, recorded the song on the Atlantic Records label in the key of E major with a funkier, more upbeat version.
- In 1994 it was also released as a single by Nick Lowe, from his album The Impossible Bird. Lowe said of the song, "I first heard "True Love Travels on a Gravel Road" on a compilation record that accompanied Peter Guralnick's book Sweet Soul Music. I love the title, I love those sort of gospely words, and it has a lovely tune. Percy Sledge's version is kind of jaunty, where mine is a little more downbeat ... I love that thing where R & B meets country ..."
- The Highwaymen recorded the song and the Afghan Whigs recorded a version for their EP Uptown Avondale.
- Australian blues and root band The Revelators covered the song on their 2000 album, The Adventures of The Amazing Revelators.
