= You Better Move On (album) =

Studio album by Billy "Crash" Craddock
- Released: 1972
- Genre: Country
- Label: Cartwheel

Billy "Crash" Craddock chronology
Knock Three Times (1971)	You Better Move On (1972)	The Best of Billy "Crash" Craddock (1973)

Singles from You Better Move On
- 1. "Dream Lover" Released: May 13, 1971; 2. "You Better Move On" Released: September 27, 1971

You Better Move On is a country album by Billy "Crash" Craddock. It was originally released in 1972 on Cartwheel Records. It reached number 18 on Record World's Country Album Chart and number 37 on Billboard's Hot Country LPs chart. It was reissued in 1973 on ABC Records.

== Track listing ==
1. "You Better Move On" (Arthur Alexander)
2. "What He Don't Know Won't Hurt Him" (Craddock)
3. "Seventh Son" (Willie Dixon)
4. "Jeanie Norman" (Craddock)
5. "The Fool" (Craddock)
6. "Dream Lover" (Bobby Darin)
7. "She Could" (Craddock)
8. "Til Morning" (Craddock)
9. "She's My Angel" (Craddock)
10. "Treat Her Right" (Roy Head)
