= Bernd Spier =

German singer (1944–2017)

Bernd Spier (6 April 1944 – 30 December 2017) was a German schlager singer and record producer. He later was a real estate broker.

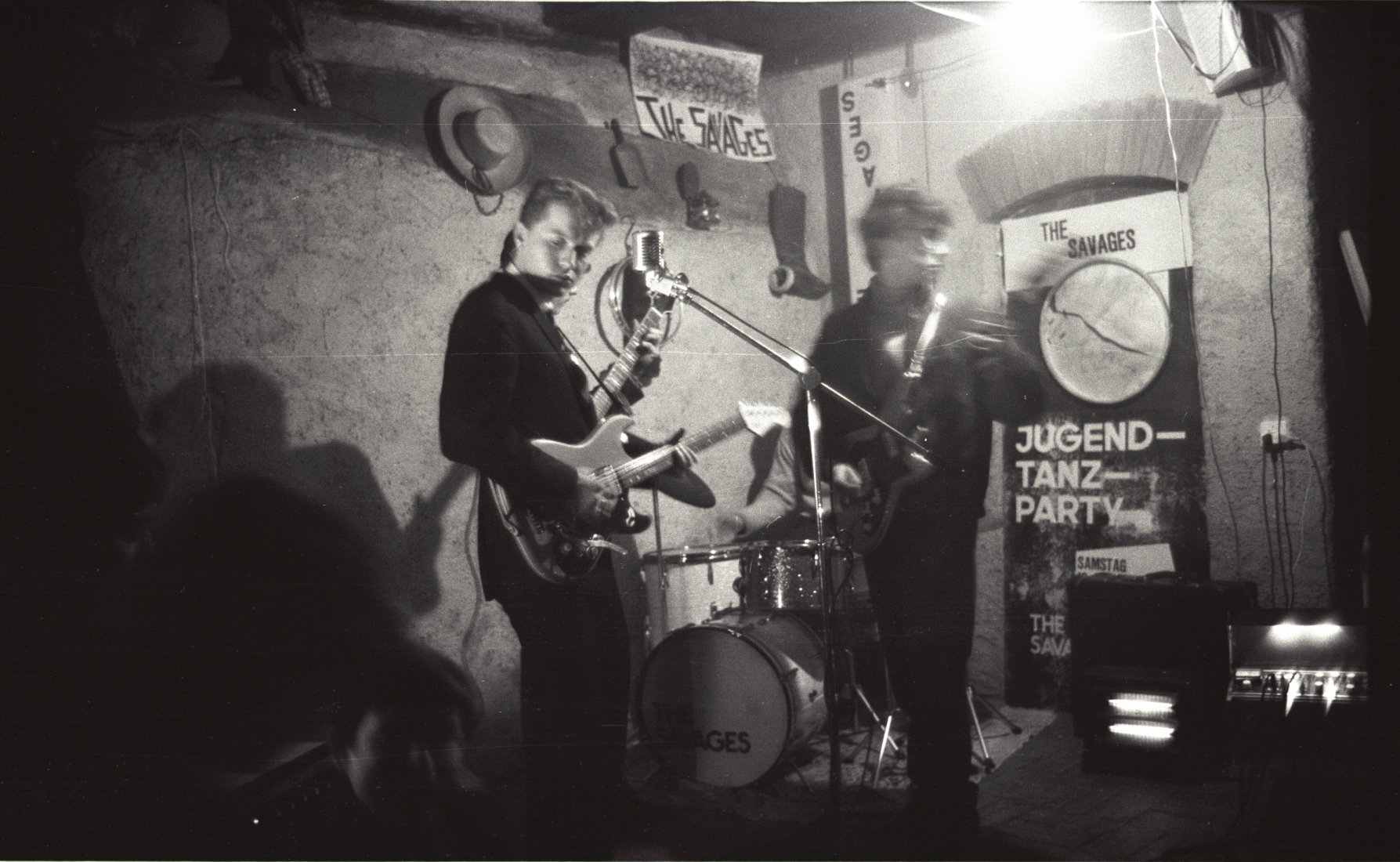
Bernd Spier

== Biography ==
Spier was born in Ludwigslust, Mecklenburg and is the son of Robby Spier, who was the conductor of the Hessischer Rundfunk orchestra in Frankfurt. Spier started his first band with two friends at the age of 15. Because of his father, he became a frequent guest on a popular radio program in Frankfurt, which then led to his discovery by CBS. His first record was released in 1963.

He sang easy listening schlager music until the Beatles and other rock 'n roll groups began to gain in popularity, threatening the careers of older artists. In 1966, he was made CBS Schallplatten's youngest record producer and as his first record as producer, he recorded his brother, Uwe.

Spier made a brief comeback in 1969 with longer hair and German versions of "Pretty Belinda", by Chris Andrews and "Knock Three Times" by Tony Orlando and Dawn. They were two of his biggest hits. With his singing career in decline, Spier became a real estate broker in Rödermark. Spier died on 30 December 2017.
