= Still Thinkin' 'bout You =

Studio album by Billy "Crash" Craddock
- Released: 1975
- Studio: Woodland (Nashville, Tennessee)
- Genre: Country
- Label: ABC/Dot
- Producer: Ron Chancey

Billy "Crash" Craddock chronology
Greatest Hits Vol. 1 (1974)	Still Thinkin' 'bout You (1975)	Easy as Pie (1976)

Singles from Still Thinkin' 'bout You
- 1. "Still Thinkin' 'bout You" Released: January 1975; 2. "I Love The Blues and the Boogie Woogie" Released: 1975

Still Thinkin' 'bout You is a country album by Billy "Crash" Craddock. It was released on ABC/Dot Records in 1975. The album yielded two hit singles: "I Love the Blues and the Boogie Woogie", which went to #10, and "Still Thinkin' 'bout You", which went to #1.

== Track listing ==
1. "Still Thinkin' 'bout You" (Johnny Christopher) - 2:28
2. "You've Never Been This Far Before" (Conway Twitty) - 2:01
3. "I Love The Blues And The Boogie Woogie" (Darrell Statler) - 2:53
4. "No Deposit, No Return" (J. Adrian) - 3:57
5. "Please James" (R. Bourke) - 2:35
6. "Don't Go City Girl On Me" (M. Kosser/R. Van Hoy) - 2:23
7. "Sounds Of Love" (N. Davenport) - 2:54
8. "Foxy Lady" (R. Chancey/J. Carvet) - 2:34
9. "Piece Of The Rock" (J. Peters) - 3:07
10. "Stay A Little Longer In Your Bed" (J. Adrian) - 2:57

NB: Tracks 1 & 2 timed at 3:01 and 3:00 respectively (Actual times on LP)

== Personnel ==
- Steel Guitar: Lloyd Green
- Lead Guitar: Billy Sanford
- Rhythm Guitars: Jerry Shook, James Colvard, Chip Young & Jimmy Capps
- Electric Bass Guitars: Tommy Allsup & Harold Bradley
- Piano: Bobby Wood & Ron Oats
- Piano & Clavinet: David Briggs & Bobby Emmons
- Bass: Bob Moore, Tommy Cogbill & Henry Strzelecki
- Drums: Willie Ackerman & Kenneth Buttrey
- Fiddles & Violins: Buddy Spicher & Lisa Silver
- Horn Arrangements (tracks 3 & 6): Bergen White

== Background Singers ==
- Hurshel Wiginton
- Sharon Vaughn
- Dolores Edgin
- Joe Babcock
- Wendellyn Suits

== Production ==
- Recorded at: Woodland Sound Studios, Nashville, Tenn.
- Producer: Ron Chancey
- Recording Engineer & Mixer: Tommy Semmes
- Backup Engineers: Pat Higdon & David McKinley
- Mastering Engineer: Bob Sowell
