= The Last Time =

The Last Time or Last Time may refer to:

== Film ==
- The Last Time (film), a 2006 film starring Michael Keaton and Brendan Fraser
- The Last Time, a 2002 short film featuring Linda Bassett

== Music ==
=== Albums ===
- Last Time (album), by Typecast, 2002
- The Last Time (album), by John Farnham, 2002

=== Songs ===
- "Last Time" (Fuel song), 2001
- "Last Time" (Labrinth song), 2012
- "Last Time" (Trey Songz song), 2008
- "The Last Time" (Agnetha Fältskog song), 1987
- "The Last Time" (All That Remains song), 2011
- "The Last Time" (Johnny Cash song), 1980
- "The Last Time" (Rolling Stones song), 1965
- "The Last Time" (The Script song), 2019
- "The Last Time" (Taylor Swift song), 2013
- "The Last Time" (Tenille Townes song), 2022
- "Last Time", by Gucci Mane from The Return of East Atlanta Santa, 2016
- "Last Time", by Idina Menzel from Idina, 2016
- "Last Time", by Rudimental from Toast to Our Differences, 2019
- "Last Time", by Shea Seger from The May Street Project, 2000
- "The Last Time", by Big Brother & the Holding Company from Big Brother & the Holding Company, 1967
- "The Last Time", by Bread from Bread, 1969
- "The Last Time", by Carina Round, 2011
- "The Last Time", by Eric Benét from Hurricane, 2005
- "The Last Time", by Eurythmics from Revenge, 1986
- "The Last Time", by Forever Changed from The Need to Feel Alive, 2005
- "The Last Time", by From Ashes to New featuring Deuce from Day One, 2016
- "The Last Time", by Gnarls Barkley from St. Elsewhere, 2006
- "The Last Time", by John Hiatt from Beneath This Gruff Exterior, 2003
- "The Last Time", by Norther from Circle Regenerated, 2011
- "The Last Time", by One Ok Rock from Eye of the Storm, 2019
- "The Last Time", by Paradise Lost from Draconian Times, 1995
- "The Last Time", by Rihanna from Music of the Sun, 2005
- "The Last Time", by Robyn from Robyn Is Here, 1995
- "The Last Time", by Soulsavers from Angels & Ghosts, 2015
- "The Last Time", by Talk Talk from It's My Life, 1984
- "The Last Time", by Within Temptation, a B-side of the single "All I Need", 2007

== See also ==
- For the Last Time (disambiguation)
