= Brad Paisley Christmas =

Studio album by Brad Paisley
- Released: October 10, 2006
- Recorded: May–August 2006
- Studio: The Castle (Franklin, Tennessee)
- Genre: Christmas-country
- Length: 45:41
- Label: Arista Nashville
- Producer: Frank Rogers

Brad Paisley chronology
Time Well Wasted (2005)	Brad Paisley Christmas (2006)	5th Gear (2007)

Professional ratings
Review scores
Source	Rating
About.com	5/5 stars
AllMusic	4.5/5 stars
Entertainment Weekly	B+

Brad Paisley Christmas is the first Christmas album and fifth studio album by American country music artist Brad Paisley. It was released on October 10, 2006, by Arista Nashville. His first album of Christmas music, features a mix of traditional Christmas songs and newly written songs. The track "Born on Christmas Day" was written by Paisley when he was thirteen years old, and the recording features elements from a recording Paisley made of the song in 1985. Also included is a cover of Buck Owens' "Santa Looked a Lot Like Daddy". Also included is "Kung Pao Buckaroo Holiday", a parody on political correctness.

== Track listing ==
No.	Title	Writer(s)	Length
1.	"Winter Wonderland"	Felix Bernard; Dick Smith	3:30
2.	"Santa Looked a Lot Like Daddy"	Buck Owens; Don Rich	4:14
3.	"I'll Be Home for Christmas"	Kim Gannon; Walter Kent; Buck Ram	4:05
4.	"Away in a Manger"	James R. Murray; Dr. John McFarland	4:47
5.	"Penguin, James Penguin"	Brad Paisley; Frank Rogers	3:18
6.	"364 Days to Go"	Paisley; Kevin Marcy	4:28
7.	"Jingle Bells" (instrumental)	Traditional	3:05
8.	"Silent Night"	Franz Gruber; Josef Mohr	4:08
9.	"Born on Christmas Day"	Paisley	4:59
10.	"Silver Bells"	Ray Evans; Jay Livingston	4:09
11.	"Kung Pao Buckaroo Holiday" (featuring the Kung Pao Buckaroos)	Paisley; Rogers	5:23
12.	"Little Jimmy Dickens Outtake" (hidden track)		0:34
Total length:			45:41

Deluxe edition
No.	Title	Writer(s)	Length
13.	"What Child is This"	William Chatterton Dix	3:45
14.	"Born on Christmas Day" (single edit)	Paisley	4:02

== Personnel ==
=== Musicians ===
- Bill Anderson, George Jones and Little Jimmy Dickens – The "Kung Pao Buckaroos" (11.1)
- Jim "Moose" Brown – keyboards, Hammond B3 organ
- Randle Currie – steel guitar
- Eric Darken – percussion
- Addie Davis, Thomas Griffith, Erica Haines, Shannon Love Hartt and Allison Smith – kids choir (5)
- Little Jimmy Dickens – lead vocals (12)
- Stuart Duncan – fiddle
- Kevin "Swine" Grantt – bass guitar, upright bass
- Aubrey Haynie – fiddle *
- Wes Hightower – backing vocals
- Mike Johnson – dobro, steel guitar
- Gordon Mote – acoustic piano, Hammond B3 organ
- Brad Paisley – lead vocals (1–6, 8–11), acoustic guitar, electric guitars, arrangements (4, 7, 8)
- Frank Rogers – arrangements (4, 7, 8)
- Manny Rogers – kid voice (6)
- Ben Sesar – drums
- Bryan Sutton – acoustic guitar, mandolin
- Sarah Valley – kids choir director and contractor (5)
- Justin Williamson – fiddle

The Nashville String Machine

- David Angell, Kirsten Cassel, David Davidson, Conni Ellisor, Pamela Sixfin and Kristin Wilkinson – string players
- John Hobbs and Kristin Wilkinson – arrangements
- John Hobbs – conductor

=== Production ===
- Richard Barrow – recording
- Drew Bollman – additional recording, mix assistant
- Brady Barnett – digital editing
- Neal Cappellino – additional recording
- The Fitzgerald Hartley Co. – management
- Judy Forde-Blair – creative production, liner notes
- Tyler Moles – digital editing
- Justin Niebank – mixing
- Brad Paisley – cover design, package design
- Katy Robbins – stylist
- Frank Rogers – producer
- Jim Shea – photography
- David Schober – additional recording, recording assistant
- Steve Short – recording assistant
- Katherine Stratton – package design
- Lori Turk – grooming
- Hank Williams – mastering
- Brian David Willis – additional recording, digital editing
- Mixed and Edited at Blackbird Studio (Nashville, Tennessee).
- Mastered at MasterMix (Nashville, Tennessee).

== Chart performance ==
=== Weekly charts ===
Chart (2006)	Peak position
US Billboard 200	47
US Top Country Albums (Billboard)	8
US Top Holiday Albums (Billboard)	2

=== Year-end charts ===
Chart (2007)	Position
US Top Country Albums (Billboard)	58
