= I'm Tore Up =

Studio album by Crash Craddock
- Released: 1964
- Label: King

Crash Craddock chronology
I'm Tore Up (1964)	Knock Three Times (1971)

I'm Tore Up is the first album by Billy "Crash" Craddock. The album was released under the name Crash Craddock. It was released in 1964 on the King label. It was rereleased two times in 1975 on the Power Pak label and the Birchmount label.

== Track listing ==
The Power Pak and King releases had the same songs in a different order. The Birchmount release left out several songs.

=== King release ===
1. "I'm Tore Up"
2. "It Hurts to Be in Love"
3. "Right Around the Corner"
4. "Talk to Me, Talk to Me"
5. "What About Love"
6. "My Baby's Got Flat Feet"
7. "Betty, Betty"
8. "Just a Little"
9. "When (Will I Find a Romance)"
10. "I Love You More Every Day"
11. "Teardrops on Your Letter"
12. "One Heartache Too Many"

=== Birchmount release ===
1. "Tore Up"
2. "When Will I Find a Romance"
3. "Love Me, Just A Little"
4. "Talk to Me"
5. "Betty Betty"
6. "Mama You Told Me (Same song as What About Love)"
7. "Teardrops on Your Letter"
8. "My Baby's Got Flat Feet"
9. "I Love You More And More Everyday"
10. "It Hurts to Be in Love"
