= Billy "Crash" Craddock's Christmas Favorites =

Studio album by Billy "Crash" Craddock
- Released: 2006
- Recorded: 2006
- Genre: Country
- Label: Cee Cee

Billy "Crash" Craddock chronology
Crash's Smashes (1996)	Billy "Crash" Craddock's Christmas Favorites (2006)	Live -N- Kickin' (2009)

Billy "Crash" Craddock's Christmas Favorites is a Christmas album recorded by Billy "Crash" Craddock. It was released in 2006 on the Cee Cee label.

== Track listing ==
1. "An Old Christmas Card"
2. "Pretty Paper"
3. "Santa Looked a Lot Like Daddy"
4. "Let It Snow"
5. "Silver Bells"
6. "Santa Claus Is Coming to Town"
7. "Blue Christmas"
8. "Away in a Manger"
9. "Winter Wonderland"
10. "Beautiful Star of Bethlehem"
