= Kaintuck Territory =

Former amusement park in Benton, Kentucky

Coordinates: 36°55′50″N 88°19′53″W

Kaintuck Territory was a theme park located near Benton, Kentucky, United States. The park was situated on the east side of U.S. Highway 641, about a mile northeast of U.S. Highway 68. It was largely conducted around an Old West theme. It was built and operated by Walter Sill. The hourly gunfights were little vignettes of the Wild West, complete with people shot off roofs. They were written and directed by Willard W. (Bill) Willingham, a veteran Western movie actor, writer, and stuntman with experience from dozens of movies. Movie actor Rory Calhoun was present for the grand opening. It was marketed primarily on a regional basis as a day-trip destination for those living within an easy driving distance. It had a steam train, a stagecoach ride, variety acts such as knife throwing, ventriloquists and magicians, a silent movie palace, and a funhouse. Other activities were Motocross races and Country music concerts.

== Events ==
Kaintuck Territory opened June 15, 1967. In 1969 a three-day "Music Festival U.S.A." was held at Kaintuck Territory, with pop, rock and country musicians competing for prizes including an RCA recording session with Chet Atkins. The venue was a natural amphitheater which seated ten thousand people, with performances on three stages.

In 1971 and 1972 the Benton Bushwhackers Motorcycle Club sponsored regional AMA (American Motorcyclist Association)-sanctioned motocross races during the summer.

In 1976 the Bicentennial Theater was added, where musical acts including the Statler Brothers, Barbara Mandrell, Billy "Crash" Craddock, Jerry Lee Lewis, Marty Robbins, Ronnie Milsap, Conway Twitty, Ernest Tubb and The Monkees appeared. The Oak Ridge Boys also appeared there in 1976. In the fall of 1978, original owner Walter Sill filed for bankruptcy. A group of private investors from Washington, D.C. bought Kaintuck Territory and reopened the park on May 26, 1979. However, the new investment group was not able to run the park profitably, and on February 20, 1980, a two-day foreclosure sale began on the park site. The park was demolished in December 1983; reclaimed concrete and wood were used by a local church mission. Prior to demolition, the park had been heavily vandalized; in one case, the entire second floor had been cut off a building with a chain saw.

== See also ==
- Amusement park
- American frontier
- Western (genre)
- Theme park
- Motocross
- Country music
