= For the First Time =

For the First Time may refer to:

== Films ==
- For the First Time (1959 film), a musical starring Mario Lanza
- For the First Time (1967 film), a Cuban short film
- For the First Time (2008 film), a Filipino romantic film

== Albums ==
- For the First Time (Count Basie album), 1974
- For the First Time (Black Country, New Road album), 2021
- For the First Time (Mario Lanza album), a 1959 soundtrack to the film For the First Time
- For the First Time (Stephanie Mills album), 1975
- For the First Time (Brenda Lee and Pete Fountain album), 1968
- For the First Time (Kim Weston album), 1967

== Songs ==
- "For the First Time" (Kenny Loggins song), 1996
- "For the First Time" (Darius Rucker song), 2017
- "For the First Time" (The Script song), 2010
- "For the First Time", a song by the Afters from the 2010 album Light Up the Sky
- "For the First Time" (The Little Mermaid song), a song from the 2023 film The Little Mermaid

== See also ==
- "Come prima", a 1950s Italian popular song, recorded in English versions as "For the First Time"
- First Time (disambiguation)
