= List of South of Nowhere episodes =

This is a list of episodes for South of Nowhere. The series premiered on November 4, 2005 on Noggin's teen-targeted programming block, The N, and ended on December 12, 2008. 40 episodes of the series were produced in total.

== Series overview ==
| Season | Episodes | Originally aired | |
| Season | Episodes | First aired | Last aired |
|---|---|---|---|
| 1 | 11 | November 4, 2005 | February 3, 2006 |
| 2 | 13 | September 29, 2006 | December 22, 2006 |
| 3 | 16 | August 10, 2007 | December 12, 2008 |

== Episodes ==
=== Season 1: 2005–06 ===
The first season originally aired as part of The N, a teen block on the Noggin channel, in the United States from November 4, 2005 to February 3, 2006. The season consisted of 11 episodes, all of which aired on Friday nights.

List of South of Nowhere season 1 episodes
| No. | Title | Directed by | Written by | Original release date | Prod. code |
|---|---|---|---|---|---|
| 1–2 | "Secret Truths" | Donna Deitch | Rose Troche (Part 1); Thomas W. Lynch (Part 2) | November 4, 2005 | 101–102 |
The Carlin Family arrives in Los Angeles and find themselves unprepared for L.A.'s fast-paced, ethnically-diverse "anything goes" environment. Sixteen-year-old Spencer Carlin never felt like she fit in small town America and now she's beginning to question everything after meeting Ashley. Glen Carlin is a handsome, outgoing 17-year-old who is an awesome basketball player, popular with the girls, the guy everyone wants to be around. Glen seems to have the world in his pocket. Spencer and Glen are joined by their adopted brother, Clay. Clay Carlin is 17, smart, sarcastic and African-American. He is looking forward to forging his own identity, but finds that "being black" in L.A. is a test he may not pass.
| 3 | "Friends, Lovers, Brothers, and Others" | Robert Townsend | Nancylee Myatt | November 11, 2005 | 103 |
Ashley's estranged rock star father, Raife Davies (Guest star C.C. DeVille), is coming into town to see her play at the local club, Gray. Aiden and Spencer are there to support her, but find themselves making music of their own with a little alcohol in their systems. Ashley is jealous when she sees Spencer kiss Aiden, which shows that she has started to have feelings for Spencer. Ashley pulls Spencer to the side and asks her what's going on. A drunk Spencer comes close and almost kisses Ashley, but Ashley stops her and tells her she can't take care of her right now. Meanwhile, Clay and Sean hit a rough spot in their new friendship and things are getting hot and heavy between Glen and Madison, who are on a secret date at the Carlin house. Feeling betrayed by her friends, Ashley eventually connects with her father in a rare moment.
| 4 | "Put Out or Get Out" | Paul Hoen | Chad Fiveash; James Patrick Stoteraux | November 18, 2005 | 104 |
Spencer is hanging out with her new friend Kelly, who unbeknownst to Spencer wants to be more than "just friends." Ashley tries to warn her of Kelly's agenda, but Spencer mistakes her concern for jealousy. Meanwhile, Ashley attends a family dinner at the Carlin's and tries her best to stir things up with Paula, Arthur and Clay. Later that night, Ashley and Clay make a connection over their childhoods and parents. Across town, Glen and Aiden find themselves stranded without a ride as part of Madison's little games.
| 5 | "First Time" | Troy Beyer | Thomas W. Lynch | December 2, 2005 | 105 |
Ashley is making a documentary for a local film festival dealing with people's first experiences with sex. When it comes out that Clay is a virgin, it seems like everyone has their own advice to offer him. Meanwhile, Madison and Sherry try to set up Ashley and rumors spread around school like wild-fire. Ashley reaps a little revenge of her own and shows the Cheer-divas how the game is really played. Spencer's first sexual experience was not good.
| 6 | "Girl's Guide to Dating" | Paul Hoen | Dawn Comer Jefferson | December 9, 2005 | 106 |
Spencer and Ashley ditch school and go to the beach. They spend the day at the ocean enjoying what Southern California has to offer: sand, sun and surfers. Spencer starts talking to Ashley about a girl she has a crush on (she is really referring to Ashley) and how she's started to develop feelings for her. Back on the school campus, police suspect that a weapon is floating around the campus and put the school on lock-down. Now Clay, Glen, Aiden, Sean and Madison are forced to spend some quality time together. During a surprise visit to the hospital where Paula works, Arthur discovers that her new boss is one of her old flames.
| 7 | "Friends With Benefits" | Robert Townsend | Dallas Jackson; Thomas W. Lynch | December 16, 2005 | 107 |
Spencer and Ashley have a friendly competition for Aiden’s affection, which gets a little out of hand. Another love triangle forms when Spencer and Ashley almost kiss, but Aiden walks in on them. Clay and Sean have a night from Hell as they are on their way back from the movies. When two dead bodies come into the ER, Paula and Arthur are forced to deal with the harsh realities of living in Los Angeles.
| 8 | "Under My Skin" | Charles Randolph-Wright | Barbara Nance | January 13, 2006 | 108 |
Ashley befriends a new girl named Josie, who Spencer does not approve of. Josie likes stealing things but Ashley ignores Spencer, claiming she is just being jealous. At school, Clay turns in a paper on James Baldwin and has a crisis of identity when he gets a "C" for his efforts. At home, Glen and Aiden arrange a poker game and almost lose their shirts to Arthur. Spencer waits for Ashley to come by because she is worried about her. Once Ashley comes by, they talk. Ashley almost tells Spencer that she loves her, but covers up by saying she loves the brownies instead.
| 9 | "Shake Rattle & Roll" | Charles Randolph-Wright | Dawn Comer Jefferson | January 20, 2006 | 109 |
Ashley and Madison have another clash in the girl’s locker room. In a little tussle, Madison discovers Ashley’s cell phone that has fallen out of her bag and the mischief begins. A basketball scout from a major University is interested in recruiting Glen and tries to persuade his decision with some expensive gifts. At home, Arthur finds a suspicious email. The Carlin family experiences their first California earthquake, which shakes the foundation of their friendships and the marriage of the parents.
| 10 | "Say it Ain't So, Spencer" | Paul Hoen | Nancylee Myatt | January 27, 2006 | 110 |
Spencer tests the waters with Aiden again by going out on a date with him. Meanwhile, Ashley feels like she has lost Spencer and spirals out of control, hooking up with a girl named Paige (Angela Sarafyan) and experimenting with danger. Clay runs into some obstacles in his search for his birth-mother and begins to feel like he has no "real" family or connection with his heritage. On the home front, Paula and Arthur start couples counseling and try to work out their ever-mounting problems.
| 11 | "What Just Happened?" | Paul Hoen | Thomas W. Lynch | February 3, 2006 | 111 |
After nursing Ashley through a rough night, Ashley and Spencer are closer than ever. When Spencer comes home she gets into an argument with Paula over Ashley, pushing Spencer further away at the most critical of times. Meanwhile, Clay borrows Sean's car and heads to Nevada for a personal mission and Glen is on a roller coaster of his own, with some great news from a college recruiter, followed by an event that may change his life forever. Towards the end of the episode, Spencer and Ashley have their first kiss and their first night together. (Guest star Tempestt Bledsoe)

==== Production ====
Thomas W. Lynch first had the idea for South of Nowhere when one of his close conservative friends told Lynch that his son had just come out to him. The man asked his son, "How do you know you're gay?" and the son responded, "How do you know you're straight?" When Lynch heard this, he says, he "knew there was a series in there about identity." He wondered why such a noteworthy event—an adolescent's coming out to their parents—had never before been explored as an ongoing subject on a television series. He "sat with the idea for a few days" and then wrote an outline of the show's pilot over a few weeks. In an effort to maintain authenticity in depicting teenage experiences, Lynch spoke to high school counselors and asked drama students at a Los Angeles high school for feedback. He pitched the series—which he was then calling "Out"—to The N executives Amy Friedman and Essie Chambers, who then commissioned him to write the pilot script.

Gabrielle Christian first auditioned for the role of Spencer (then called "Zooey") in July 2004, though Lynch also had her read for Ashley's part. Mandy Musgrave also auditioned for the role of Spencer, but Lynch liked her chemistry with Christian, so he paired the two up with Musgrave as Ashley. The pilot was first shot in October 2004 and directed by Rose Troche, but after the series was picked up by The N in January 2005, Lynch decided to recast many of the characters. He said that "I didn't pick [Christian] up right away, I had her keep re-auditioning. ... I [had] to make sure that this combination [was] perfect." Her contract was finally picked up in May 2005 and the pilot was re-filmed with the new cast in July. Filming took place in Los Angeles, with a correctional facility used largely as the high school set. Donna Deitch, who directed the second version of the pilot but no subsequent South of Nowhere episodes said that the pilot is "something I'm really, really proud of, because I think that show has a look, a style to it that really helps". She felt that the style she set suited the material and was "fairly inventive" for a low-budget series.

=== Season 2: 2006 ===
The second season originally aired between September 29, 2006 and December 22, 2006 on The N, a teen block on the Noggin channel. The season consisted of 13 episodes all airing on Friday nights.

List of South of Nowhere season 2 episodes
| No. | Title | Directed by | Written by | Original release date | Prod. code |
|---|---|---|---|---|---|
| 12–13 | "The Morning After" | Robert Townsend | Thomas W. Lynch | September 29, 2006 | 201–202 |
It's a new day. Ashley and Spencer wake up after their first night together fully committed to each other, but when Ashley's world suddenly shakes apart she finds herself pushing Spencer away again. Meanwhile Aiden wakes up next to Madison wondering what he's gotten himself into, then he finds a way out. Glen faces the first days after a debilitating injury, while Clay copes with life after meeting his birth mother.
| 14 | "Behind the Music" | Bethany Rooney | Jonas E. Agin | October 6, 2006 | 203 |
Ashley's only had a sister for a few weeks, and she's already sick of it. Things get ugly between her and Kyla, and a VH1 special about their dad makes them even worse. and the fact is that Aiden's crushing on Kyla can't be helping much either.
| 15 | "Guess Who's Coming Out to Dinner?" | Bethany Rooney | Chad Fiveash; James Patrick Stoteraux | October 13, 2006 | 204 |
Spencer's freaked out by Ashley's obsessions. It's bad enough that she's totally preoccupied with Kyla and Aiden's relationship, but now she's pressuring Spencer to come out to her family. Clay's kind of freaked too‚ because Chelsea might be leaving forever.
| 16 | "Rules of Engagement" | Charles Randolph-Wright | Paige Bernhardt | October 20, 2006 | 205 |
When a hate crime erupts around Spencer at school and Glen's rage over her sexuality boils over at home, Spencer finds herself caught in the middle of violent intolerance. Meanwhile Kyla pushes aside her relationship with Aiden, just when Madison's pushing to take her place.
| 17 | "That Is So Not Mom" | Charles Randolph-Wright | Earl Davis | November 3, 2006 | 206 |
Clay's past rips into his life when his birth mother moves into town. As he's reeling, Chelsea tells him a secret that could tear apart his future. Spencer has problems with her own past when an old friend from Ohio brings out a side of her that Ashley's never seen. Glen, meanwhile, can barely handle the present as his dependence on pain pills gets worse.
| 18 | "Come Out, Come Out, Wherever You Are" | Bethany Rooney | Nancylee Myatt | November 10, 2006 | 207 |
While Paula and Arthur go out of town Glen decides to throw a party. It gets out of hand and they stop the party. Meanwhile, Glen gets arrested for drugs and Madison show Aiden the real reason why Kyla went back home for the weekend. As Paula and her husband come home due to Glen, Paula goes up the stairs and walks in on Ashley and Spencer in the middle of having sex. Paula freaks out from the shock and pulls Ashley out by her hair while Ashley and Spencer fight to be together.
| 19 | "That's the Way the World Crumbles" | Bethany Rooney | Jonas E. Agin | November 17, 2006 | 208 |
When Paula closes the front door she turns around and says "You disgust me." and in response Spencer yells "I hate you!" Paula can't deal with the fact that her daughter's in love with another girl. When she cuts off Spencer from Ashley, she unintentionally drives Spencer away from her family. Aiden tries to bond with Ashley over their relationship problems, but Madison would prefer he lean on her.
| 20 | "Objects May Be Closer Than They Appear" | Robert Townsend | Chad Fiveash; James Patrick Stoteraux | December 1, 2006 | 209 |
With life getting out of hand at home, Spencer and Ashley hit the road and try to escape. As they head out of town, Kyla heads back in to find Aiden waiting to confront her about her lies. And when Chelsea's secret pregnancy is discovered, she picks up sympathy from the last person she expects.
| 21 | "Love and War and Love and War" | Robert Townsend | Paige Bernhardt | December 8, 2006 | 210 |
Arthur looks for a way to bring his shattered family back together, so Glen suggests a time-tested way for healing emotional wounds: an all out paintball war! With Spencer caught on the family battlefield, Ashley spends more time with Aiden. He's still "just friends" with Kyla, thanks to Madison, who's about to take a full-on karma smackdown.
| 22 | "Love, Child and Videotape" | Nancylee Myatt | Jenelle Lindsay | December 15, 2006 | 211 |
Spencer and Ashley have been together for months, and they couldn't be happier. Or could they? When an old tape of Ashley and Aiden surfaces, it looks like she might have been way happier back then. Meanwhile, Clay and Chelsea both come to a decision about the baby. Too bad it's not the same decision...
| 23 | "Too Many Girls, Not Enough Aiden" | Rose Troche | Nancylee Myatt | December 22, 2006 | 212 |
Aiden's feeling the pressure of the different women in his life. Madison, Kyla, Ashley, and Spencer all want something from him, and it seems like to make one of them happy, he has to hurt another. His friendship with Ashley's driving her and Spencer apart, and there's so much estrogen after him that Aiden finds himself turning to the one person he can't stand.
| 24 | "Trouble in Paradise" | Rose Troche | Nancylee Myatt | December 22, 2006 | 213 |
On prom night, Clay and Chelsea look for one last evening of happiness, while Glen goes to drastic measures looking for a purpose to his life. Madison's losing her marbles, and Aiden might lose all the women in his life, thanks to one shocking secret.

=== Season 3: 2007–08 ===
The third and final season originally aired between August 10, 2007 and December 12, 2008 on Noggin's teen branch, The N. The season consisted of sixteen episodes all airing on Friday nights.

List of South of Nowhere season 3 episodes
| No. | Title | Directed by | Written by | Original release date | Prod. code |
|---|---|---|---|---|---|
| 25–26 | "The Valley of Shadows" | Bethany Rooney | Arika Lisanne Mittman | August 10, 2007 | 301–302 |
Moments after the drive-by shooting at the King High prom, ambulances rush the victims to the ER, and everyone realizes that nothing will be the same again. As Spencer and Ashley rechart their existence in the aftermath, their relationship might not be strong enough to take the strain.
| 27 | "The It Girls" | Paul Hoen | Arika Lisanne Mittman | August 17, 2007 | 303 |
Ashley and Kyla have $25 million to spend, and they're starting by dropping a chunk of it on a gorgeous new loft as far from Ash's mom as possible. With the two of them finally acting like sisters, maybe Ashley doesn't even need Spencer anymore. Not like she has a choice, Spencer's done with her and is moving on... to the last person she expects. Chelsea and Spencer also experiences a surprise that puts things into perspective. Meanwhile, when the MTV documentary about the prom shooting finally hits the air, Chelsea and the Carlins are forced to come to grips with Clay's death.
| 28 | "Spencer's New Girlfriend" | Paul Hoen | Sarah Jane Cunningham; Suzie V. Freeman | August 24, 2007 | 304 |
As Ashley and Aiden's relationship cools off, Spencer and Carmen heat up.
| 29 | "The Truth Hurts" | Bethany Rooney | Arika Lisanne Mittman | August 31, 2007 | 305 |
As Spencer tries to protect Carmen from Ashley, Aiden tries to protect himself from himself.
| 30 | "Fighting Crime" | Bethany Rooney | Larry Mollin | September 7, 2007 | 306 |
Spencer's done with Carmen, and just in time too, Ashley needs her support, because an old friend from New York is ready to make her famous. Meanwhile, Aiden and Madison figure that since they're both unattached, maybe they could try attaching every once in a while. And Glen discovers that Chelsea is thinking of changing her plans for the baby, but plans sometimes have a way of changing themselves.
| 31 | "Saturday Night is for Fighting" | Paul Hoen | Stacy Kravetz | September 14, 2007 | 307 |
Jake's working hard to make Kyla the new It girl, but when she finds out that Ashley's poised to out-It her, It hits the fan. Aiden's there to see it splatter, and realizes that he might be splattering along with it. Meanwhile, Spencer discovers that guys have a hard time distinguishing being with her from being with her.
| 32 | "Gay Pride" | Paul Hoen | Arika Lisanne Mittman | September 21, 2007 | 308 |
Spencer wants someone to help her show her pride, but everyone's too busy worrying about themselves. Spencer surprises Ashley, by showing up at her loft with nothing on but a jacket and high heels and they end up sleeping together. this means they got back together. Chelsea tries to deal with losing her baby; Meanwhile Kyla's success has brutal results for her future. The Gang has a party to remember the good times.
| 33 | "Career Day" | Bethany Rooney | Arika Lisanne Mittman | October 10, 2008 | 309 |
Spashley's back, and this time Ashley's the one looking for commitment. Glen gets fired by Jake because he wasn't there for Kyla when the photographer cornered her from the night before. Glen comes home to find Arthur "son-ing" Aiden, who is also dating the new girl, Sasha Miller. Meanwhile, Jake decides to scam Ashley and make Kyla's voice on the cd fake, seeing as how she can't sing.
| 34 | "Spencer's 18th Birthday" | Bethany Rooney | Arika Lisanne Mittman | October 17, 2008 | 310 |
Spencer's grandmother comes to visit for her special day. Spencer has a hard time telling her grandmother about her newfound sexuality. Meanwhile, Spencer gets to know Lily's girlfriend, Jonica. Kyla and Ashley are asked to sing on national television, they embarrass themselves live, all thanks to Kyla and her fake voice. Meanwhile, Glen becomes hurt when he witness Aiden spending quality time with his father.
| 35 | "A Very Inconvenient Truth" | Paul Hoen | Larry Mollin; Charles Rosin | October 24, 2008 | 311 |
Ashley and Spencer can't seem to get any alone time together once Jonica interrupts. Kyla also decides to come clean to Ashley about fake record voice. Ashley is furious and forces Kyla to apologize in front of everyone on national television. Jake becomes infuriated with her and Kyla dumps him. Meanwhile, Glen and Arthur invite Aiden to go camping with them in the Sierra Mountains. Once there, Glen finally breaks down over how much his father prefers Aiden over him. Lastly, Ashley and Kyla make up, but not for long once Ashley witnesses a video Kyla made.
| 36 | "Love and Kisses" | Paul Hoen | Charles Rosin; Arika Lisanne Mittman | November 7, 2008 | 312 |
Ashley watches the video of a high Kyla, admitting to the world that Ashley is a whore and her father was a joke. Ashley feels betrayed in the most ultimate way and forces Kyla to get out. Unfortunately, she has nowhere to go. Meanwhile, Aiden tries to make a better connection with Sasha. Eventually, when he doesn't make it into her school, she dumps him because she doesn't think he is a good enough person. Glen and Chelsea become closer and finally give in to their tension, while Jonica continues to flirt with a drunk Spencer. Once Spencer gives in and makes her move on Jonica, the truth comes out that Jonica is only flirting for fun. In the end, Ashley shares her special birthday song she wrote just for Spencer and forgives her for the mishap with Jonica.
| 37 | "Better Late Than Never" | Richard Wafer | Lindsey Rosin | November 14, 2008 | 313 |
Glen finally finds love, but Chelsea has a hard time accepting the new feelings, on account of Clay. Meanwhile, Aiden attempts to defend Kyla, while Ashley wants nothing to do with her. Soon after, everyone realizes that the video of Kyla was edited together by Jake, and Ashley ends up forgiving Kyla, letting her stay. Elsewhere, Sean returns from New Orleans to help Chelsea with her memorial presentation and try to win her over in the process. In the end, while everyone has dinner at the Carlins to celebrate the day, Glen finally confesses his love to Chelsea at the dinner table and everyone, including Chelsea herself, is left utterly speechless.
| 38 | "Past, Present, and Future" | Richard Wafer | Jonas E. Agin | November 21, 2008 | 314 |
Everyone deals with the aftermath of Glen's confession. Sean slowly learns to accept Chelsea's decision to be with Glen. Carmen returns afters a few surprise appearances on the street. She persuades Kyla to let her live with her and Ashley. Also, Madison returns from her tour with Justin Timberlake, but only for a while until the European tour starts up. Meanwhile, Ashley is nervous about having Spencer go off to college life without her. Lastly, Aiden gets into a motorcycle accident.
| 39 | "Taking Seconds" | Paul Hoen | Jonas E. Agin; Shauna McGarry | December 5, 2008 | 315 |
Ashley tries to go over a solo artist plan with Ethan, but it seems almost impossible with Madison's return. Ethan hired her to sing Ashley's songs. He wants them to be partner's, but is having no luck in getting the girls approval. Ashley wants her songs to herself because they came from her heart, and she doesn't want anyone else to sing them but her. Spencer encourages Ashley to take the deal, while Carmen sees Ashley's point of view and tells her not to. In the end, Ashley and Madison work out a system that leaves them with brand new songs for Madison that still have Ashley's flair in writing. Meanwhile, Aiden is feeling better from his accident, but Kyla seems to be the one having to snap some sense into him by slapping and kissing him. Also, Carmen looks for a place to live, but ends up wanting to reside with the Davies Girls.
| 40 | "On the Precipice" | Paul Hoen | Thomas W. Lynch; Charles Rosin; Arika Lisanne Mittman | December 12, 2008 | 316 |
In the one-hour series finale episode, Spencer must consider her future with Ashley, who seems ready for commitment. Meanwhile, everyone else gets ready to move on to the next chapter on their lives. Glen and Chelsea take the final step in their relationship by making love, while Aiden and Kyla are finally back together, and plans of a Vegas wedding are in the air. At breakfast Ashley questions Spencer about college and if they are both going to be together forever in the future In the end, Carmen tries to seduce Ashley, so Ashley kicks her out. Ashley is now ready to tell Spencer that she does not want her to leave for Boston. At Spencer's graduation party, her movie is shown, and she agrees to move in with Ashley at the loft.
