= Crash (Billy "Crash" Craddock album) =

Studio album by Billy "Crash" Craddock
- Released: 1976
- Genre: Country
- Label: ABC/Dot

Billy "Crash" Craddock chronology
Easy as Pie (1976)	Crash (1976)	Billy "Crash" Craddock 16 Favorite Hits (1977)

Singles from Crash
- 1. "Broken Down in Tiny Pieces" Released: October 23, 1976; 2. "Just a Little Thing" Released: 1977

Crash is a country album by Billy "Crash" Craddock. It was released in 1976 on the ABC/Dot label.

== Track listing ==
1. "Broken Down in Tiny Pieces"
2. "Don Juan"
3. "In The Middle Of The Night"
4. "A Tear Fell" (Eugene Randolph, Dorian Burton)
5. "Footprints On The Windshield Upside Down"
6. "Shake It Easy"
7. "There's More To Her Than Meets The Eye"
8. "The Water's Too Rough Tonight"
9. "Two Pretty Words That Do Not Rhyme"
10. "Just A Little Thing"
11. "Why'd The Last Time Have To Be The Best"
