= Toni Wine =

American singer and songwriter (born 1947)

Toni Wine (born June 4, 1947) is an American pop music songwriter, who wrote songs for such artists as The Mindbenders ("A Groovy Kind of Love"), Tony Orlando and Dawn ("Candida"), and Checkmates, Ltd. ("Black Pearl") in the late 1960s and 1970s. Wine also sang the female vocals for the cartoon music group The Archies, most notably on their #1 hit song "Sugar, Sugar" (singing the line "I'm gonna make your life so sweet"). She shared the lead vocals in the Archies' subsequent single, "Jingle Jangle" with Ron Dante using his falsetto voice. In addition, Wine was a backing vocalist on "It Hurts to Be in Love" (originally recorded for Neil Sedaka, whose vocals were replaced by those of Gene Pitney after Sedaka moved to RCA) and on Willie Nelson's "Always on My Mind."

== Career ==
Wine was born in Washington Heights, New York City, United States. In 1963, Wine had a nationally charted single with "My Boyfriend's Coming Home For Christmas". It reached #22 on Billboard's "Best Bets For Christmas" survey. She co-wrote The Shirelles' early 1964 mid-chart hit "Tonight You're Gonna Fall in Love With Me".

Wine attended the Juilliard School of Music, where she studied piano. She worked as a songwriter for Screen Gems Publishing, where she collaborated with several other artists and then teamed with Carole Bayer Sager. They wrote the song "A Groovy Kind of Love," recorded by The Mindbenders in 1966 (after the group split with Wayne Fontana) and reached the top of the U.S. Billboard Hot 100 chart. "A Groovy Kind of Love" was also a 1988 hit for Phil Collins.

Wine also recorded as a solo artist. She released 12 singles between 1963 and 1977. She co-wrote The Ronettes 1969 single "You Came, You Saw, You Conquered" with Phil Spector.

Wine became a member of The Archies in 1969, along with Jeff Barry, Bobby Bloom, and Ron Dante. In 1970, she co-wrote "Candida", which she recorded with Linda November and Tony Orlando, kicking off the most successful phase of Orlando's singing career. Wine also sang backup on Orlando's follow-up hit, "Knock Three Times."

After moving to Memphis, Tennessee with her husband, record producer Chips Moman, Wine continued to write and record songs and work as a session singer. For over 30 years, she was one of the voices of Meow Mix Cat Food, sharing with Linda November on the "meow, meow, meow, meow." She also provided backup vocals on the Steely Dan song "Babylon Sisters" on their 1980 album Gaucho.

In 2007, Wine toured and appeared in concert with Tony Orlando as vocalist and keyboardist. She performed the same function in Orlando's 2011, 2014, 2016 and 2022 tours.

== See also ==
- Bubblegum pop
- The Archie Show
