= Rub It In (album) =

Studio album by Billy "Crash" Craddock
- Released: 1974
- Genre: Country
- Label: ABC
- Producer: Ron Chancey

Billy "Crash" Craddock chronology
Mr. Country Rock (1973)	Rub It In (1974)	Greatest Hits Vol. 1 (1974)

Singles from Rub It In
- 1. "Rub It In" Released: June 1974; 2. "Ruby Baby" Released: October 1974

Rub It In is a country album by Billy "Crash" Craddock. It was released in 1974 on ABC Records. It was produced by Ron Chancey. The album yielded two singles that went to #1 on the country music charts, "Rub It In" and "Ruby Baby".

== Track listing ==
1. "Rub It In"
2. "Walk When Love Walks"
3. "Ruby Baby"
4. "Stop! If You Love Me"
5. "Farmer's Daughter"
6. "Quarter 'Til 3"
7. "Walk Your Kisses"
8. "It's Hard to Love a Hungry, Worried Man"
9. "Arkansas Red"
10. "Home Is Such a Lonely Place to Go"

== Charts ==
Chart (1975)	Peak position
Australia (Kent Music Report)	95
US Billboard 200	142
US Top Country Albums (Billboard)	6
