= The New Will Never Wear Off of You =

Studio album by Billy "Crash" Craddock
- Released: 1982
- Genre: Country
- Label: Capitol

Billy "Crash" Craddock chronology
The Best of Billy "Crash" Craddock (1982)	The New Will Never Wear Off of You (1982)	Greatest Hits (1983)

The New Will Never Wear Off Of You is a country album by Crash Craddock. It was Craddock's 16th album, released on Capitol Records in 1982.

== Track listing ==
1. "Love Busted" (Alan Rhody, Red Lane)
2. "I Want Some" (Rhody)
3. "Next Stop Love" (Curly Putman, Jamie O'Hara)
4. "Odette" (Tony Hiller)
5. "I Just Need You for Tonight" (J.L. Wallace, Ken Bell, Terry Skinner)
6. "The New Will Never Wear Off of You" (Craig Morris)
7. "Part of Me That Needs You Most" (Mike Chapman, Nicky Chinn)
8. "I Can't Get Over Getting Over You" (Elton John, Gary Osborne)
9. "Looking Back" (Belford Hendricks, Brook Benton, Clyde Otis)
10. "Darlin' Take Care of Yourself" (Mickey Newbury)

== Personnel ==
- Guitar: Jimmy Capps, Jack Eubanks, Lloyd Green, Michael Leech, Kenneth Mims, Thom Rotella, Dale Sellers,
  Jerry Shook, Reggie Young
- Bass: Charles Calello, Joe Osborn
- Keyboards: David Briggs, Bobby Emmons, Clydene Jackson, Bob Thompson, Bobby Wood
- Drums: Kenny Buttrey, Jerry Kroon, Larrie Londin
- Saxophone: Denis Sole
- Harmonica: Tommy Morgan
- Fiddle: Buddy Spicher
- Strings: Robert Adcock, George Binkley, Samuel Boghossian, Alfred Breuning, Stuart Canin, Marvin Chantry,
  Roy Christensen, Virginia Christensen, Alan de Veritch, Joel Diamond, Irving Geller, James Getzoff, Carl Gorodetzky,
  Laurence Harvin, Ronald Leonard, Marvin Limonick, Joy Lyle, Dennis Molchan, Jerome Reisler, Walter Schwede,
  Sidney Sharp, Gary Vanosdale, Pamela Vanosdale, Stephanie Woolf, Robert Wray
- Backing Vocals: Don Grant, Hurshel Wiginton, Judy Rodman, Julia Waters Tillman, Karen Taylor, Lea Jane Berinati,
  Louis Nunley, Luther Waters, Mary Beth Anderson, Maxine Waters Willard, Oren Waters, Bergen White, Dennis Wilson
