= Bless You (Tony Orlando song) =

Single by Tony Orlando

from the album Bless You and 11 Other Great Hits
- B-side: "Am I the Guy"
- Released: 1961
- Genre: Pop
- Length: 2:06
- Label: Epic
- Songwriters: Barry Mann & Cynthia Weil
- Producers: Al Nevins, Don Kirshner & Jack Keller

Tony Orlando singles chronology
"Halfway to Paradise" (1961)	"Bless You" (1961)	"Happy Times (Are Here to Stay)" (1961)

"Bless You" is a song released in 1961 by Tony Orlando. The song was written by Barry Mann and Cynthia Weil.

== Chart performance ==
The song spent 12 weeks on the Billboard Hot 100 chart, peaking at No. 15, while reaching No. 5 on the UK's Record Retailer chart, and No. 5 on Canada's CHUM Hit Parade.

Chart (1961)	Peak position
Canada (CHUM Hit Parade)	5
UK Record Retailer	5
US Billboard Hot 100	15
US Cash Box Top 100	17
US Cash Box Records Disc Jockeys Played Most	13
US Cash Box Top Ten Juke Box Tunes	18

== Year-end lists ==
- The song was ranked No. 73 on Billboard's end of year "Hot 100 for 1961 - Top Sides of the Year".

== Cover versions ==
- Mann released a version of the song himself in 1962, as the flipside of "Teenage Has-Been".
