= Kaintuck Hollow =

Valley in the American state of Missouri

Kaintuck Hollow is a valley in western Phelps County in the Ozarks of Missouri.

The headwaters for the valley are at 37°48′51″N 91°54′33″W and the confluence with Mill Creek is at 37°52′12″N 91°55′34″W. The valley source area lies west of Missouri Route T at an elevation of about 1060 feet. The stream flows northeast and then northwest roughly paralleling Route T. The confluence with Mill Creek is adjacent to the Mill Creek Picnic Area at an elevation of 740 feet. Kaintuck Hollow Road follows the stream valley from the Kaintuck Church on Route T.

Kaintuck Hollow was named after Kentucky, the native state of a large share of the early pioneers.
