= Still Thinkin' 'bout You (song) =

- German release picture sleeve

Single by Billy "Crash" Craddock

from the album Still Thinkin' 'bout You
- B-side: "Stay a Little Longer in Your Bed"
- Released: January 1975
- Genre: Country
- Label: Dot
- Songwriter(s): Johnny Christopher, Bobby Wood
- Producer(s): Ron Chancey

Billy "Crash" Craddock singles chronology
"Ruby Baby" (1974)	"Still Thinkin' 'bout You" (1975)	"I Love The Blues and the Boogie Woogie" (1975)

"Still Thinkin' 'bout You" is a song written by Johnny Christopher and Bobby Wood, and recorded by American country music artist Billy "Crash" Craddock. It was released January 1975 as the first single from his album Still Thinkin' 'bout You. The song peaked at number 4 on the Billboard Hot Country Singles chart. It also reached number 1 on the RPM Country Tracks chart in Canada.

== Chart performance ==
Chart (1975)	Peak position
US Hot Country Songs (Billboard)	4
Canadian RPM Country Tracks	1
