= Live -n- Kickin' =

Live -N- Kickin'

Live album by Billy "Crash" Craddock
- Released: 2009
- Recorded: 2009
- Genre: Country

Billy "Crash" Craddock chronology
Christmas Favorites (2006)	Live -N- Kickin' (2009)

Live -n- Kickin'' is a live album by country singer Billy "Crash" Craddock. It was recorded in July 2009 at the Little Nashville Opry in Nashville, Indiana. It was released in August 2009.

== Track listing ==
1. Why You Been Gone So Long
2. Ruby Baby
3. Easy as Pie
4. Knock Three Times
5. I Just Had You on My Mind
6. It Ain't Gonna Rain No More
7. Kaw-Liga
8. Jambalaya
9. Love Me #1
10. I Never Go Around Mirrors
11. All You Ever Do Is Bring Me Down
12. Bitter They Are
13. Do You Believe Me Now
14. Love Me #2
15. Rub It In
16. An American Trilogy
