= The First Time Ever I Saw Your Face (disambiguation) =

"The First Time Ever I Saw Your Face" is a 1957 song written by Ewan MacColl, notably covered by Roberta Flack in 1972.

The First Time Ever I Saw Your Face may also refer to:

- The First Time Ever (I Saw Your Face) (Vikki Carr album), 1972
- The First Time Ever (I Saw Your Face) (Johnny Mathis album), 1972

== See also ==
- "Since First I Saw Your Face", a song set to music in 1607 by Thomas Ford and in 1942 by Roger Quilter in the Arnold Book of Old Songs
