= Back on Track (Billy Craddock album) =

Studio album by Billy "Crash" Craddock
- Released: 1989
- Genre: Country
- Label: Atlantic

Billy "Crash" Craddock chronology
Crash's Greatest Hits (1986)	Back on Track (1989)	Boom Boom Baby (1992)

Back on Track is an album by country singer Billy "Crash" Craddock. It was released in 1989 on Atlantic Records.

== Track listing ==
1. Big River to Cross
2. Love Night
3. To Love Somebody
4. Life's Too Short (To Hurt This Long)
5. Some Such Foolishnesses
1. You Got the Job
2. Just Another Miserable Day Here in Paradise
3. I Can't Help It (If I'm Still In Love With You)
4. Girls That Everybody Knew
5. What Good Is Falling Asleep
6. Softly Diana
