= As easy as pie =

Idiom

"As easy as pie" is a popular colloquial idiom and simile which is used to describe a task or experience as pleasurable and simple. The phrase is often interchanged with piece of cake, which shares the same connotation.

== Origin ==
The phrase was used in 1910 by Zane Grey in "The Young Forester" and in the Saturday Evening Post of 22 February 1913. It may have been a development of the phrase like eating pie, first recorded in Sporting Life in 1886. In 1855, the phrase, in a slight variation was published in a book called Which? Right or Left? Here it was used as nice as a pie. Alternatively, since in pre-reformation England the collection of liturgical rules for all 35 various days when Easter could fall was called Pie, easy as pie may ironically refer to overly complicated rubrics.

There are some claims that its use in New Zealand in the 1920s was influenced by the similar expressions pie at or pie on from the Maori term pai 'good'.
