= You Better Move On (song) =

Single by Arthur Alexander
- B-side: "A Shot of Rhythm and Blues"
- Released: December 1961
- Studio: Fame Studios, Muscle Shoals, Alabama
- Genre: R&B
- Length: 2:40
- Label: Dot
- Songwriter(s): Arthur Alexander
- Producer(s): Rick Hall

Arthur Alexander singles chronology
"You Better Move On" (1961)	"Where Have You Been (All My Life)" (1962)

"You Better Move On" is a 1961 rhythm and blues song by Arthur Alexander. It reached number 24 on the Billboard Hot 100 in March 1962. Versions by Billy "Crash" Craddock, George Jones and Johnny Paycheck were hits on the Country charts.

== Arthur Alexander version ==
The lyrics were inspired by Alexander's real life situation, in which his girlfriend and future wife already had a boyfriend. Alexander said of the situation "When I met her out of high school he was still hanging in there. His family was pretty well off. I didn't have no money but I knew she liked me. It was a small town and people would be talking. That's where I got the idea for the song. I didn't talk to him personally. I said it in song."

The song was recorded at the fledgling FAME Studios, which at that point was located above the City Drug Store in Florence, Alabama. (The studio would shortly move to its more famous location in nearby Muscle Shoals, Alabama.) The session musicians on the recording included David Briggs, piano, Terry Thompson, guitar, Forest Riley, acoustic guitar, Norbert Putnam, bass guitar, Jerry Carrigan, drums, and unknown back up singers.

Music critic Toby Creswell included "You Better Move On" as one of the 1001 great songs of all time.

== The Rolling Stones version ==
The Rolling Stones released their version of Arthur Alexander's song on an EP, The Rolling Stones, on January 10, 1964. Bruce Eder of AllMusic wrote about the EP: "the real centrepiece was Arthur Alexander's 'You Better Move On,' an American-spawned favourite that the band had been doing in concert — this was their chance to show a softer, more lyrical and soulful sound that was every bit as intense as the blues and hard R&B they'd already done on record." The EP reached no. 1 in the UK EP charts in February 1964, having entered the chart the week after its release.

== Billy "Crash" Craddock version ==
Billy "Crash" Craddock released a version of the song as a single in 1971 and on his album of the same name the following year. Craddock's version reached No. 10 on Billboard's Hot Country Singles chart, No. 4 on Cash Box's Country Top 65 chart, and No. 9 on Record World's Country Singles Chart.

== Tommy Roe version ==
Tommy Roe released a version in 1979, which reached No. 70 on Billboard's Hot Country Singles chart, No. 68 on the Cash Box Top 100 Country chart, and No. 75 on Record World's Country Singles chart.

== George Jones and Johnny Paycheck version ==
George Jones and Johnny Paycheck recorded a version for their 1980 collaboration album Double Trouble. It was also released as a single and reached No. 18 on Billboard's Hot Country Singles chart, No. 19 on Record World's Country Singles chart, and No. 23 on the Cash Box Top 100 Country chart.

== Mink Deville version ==
Mink DeVille recorded a version for their fourth album Coup de Grâce in 1981. It was released as a second single of the album.

== Other versions ==
Between 1961 and 2020, more than 50 versions of the song were recorded by a variety of artists, such as the Hollies, Dean Martin, and Mark Knopfler. Also several versions were recorded in other languages, including Croatian, Danish, Finnish, French and German. see https://secondhandsongs.com/performance/1472/all for a full list.
