= Boom Boom Baby (song) =

Single by "Crash" Craddock

from the album Boom Boom Baby
- B-side: "Don't Destroy Me"
- Released: 1959
- Recorded: 1959
- Genre: Rockabilly
- Length: 2:25
- Label: Columbia; Coronet
- Songwriter(s): Dave Burgess

"Crash" Craddock singles chronology
| "Sweetie Pie" / "Blabbermouth" (1959) | "Boom Boom Baby" / "Don't Destroy Me" (1959) | "I Want That" / "Since She Turned Seventeen" (1960) |

"Boom Boom Baby" is a song written by Dave Burgess. It became a number one hit in Australia when it was recorded by Crash Craddock in 1959. It was released on the Columbia label in the United States and was released on the Coronet label in Australia. The flip side of the record, "Don't Destroy Me", reached #94 on the charts in the U.S.

A 1998 song with the same name was released by The Ugly Americans.

== Covers ==
- The song was first recorded by Huelyn Duvall in either late 1957 or 1958, but not released until 1960 on Challenge Records.
- Australian band Ol' 55 covered the song on their album, The Vault (1980).

== See also ==
- List of number-one singles in Australia during the 1960s
