= Cartwheel Records =

American record label

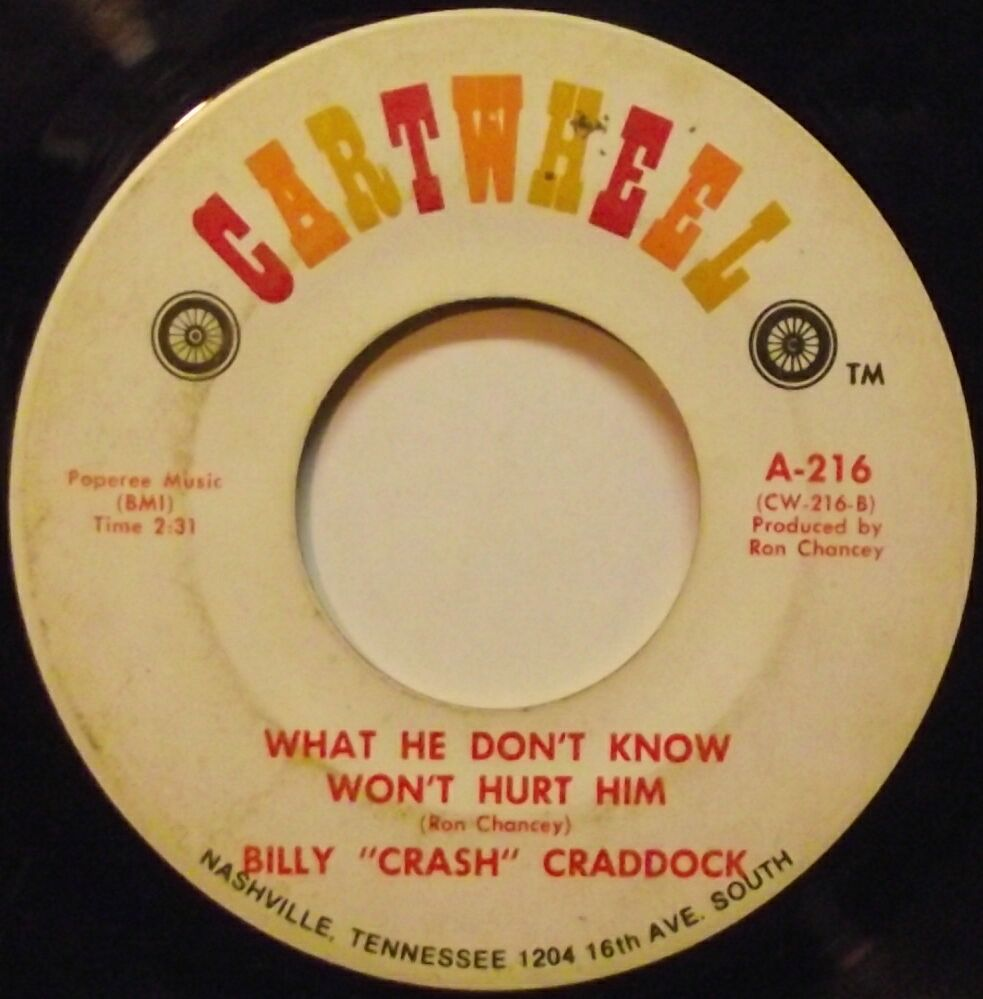
- Parent company: ABC-Dunhill
- Genre: Country
- Country of origin: United States
- Location: Gainesville, Georgia

Cartwheel Records was a record label located in Nashville, Tennessee. The label was responsible for the start of the country music career of Billy "Crash" Craddock. He had his first No. 1 country hit on the label with "Knock Three Times".

== Background ==
The label started out in Gainesville, Georgia and then later moved its Music division to Nashville, Tennessee with just the headquarters remaining in Georgia. In November 1972, the label was purchased by ABC, Dunhill. It was reported in Billboard that there were some artists who would have had existing contracts prior to the sale of the label. They were Pam Gilbert, Glen Canyon and Duane Lee and Harold Lee. The article stated that their contracts and promotion on the market were being honored.

== Staff ==
The Nashville company was headed by A&R man Ron Chancey who was formerly with Buck Owens' publishing company. Ron Chancey and Dale Morris met on 16th Avenue literally by chance. Dale told Ron he had a recording artist, Billy Crash Craddock. Ron hired Dale as vice president of sales and record promotion. Ron and Dale made a good team. They had hit after hit, with Ron producing the artist, and Dale promoting and selling the records. Dale was a good salesman. Before Cartwheel records, Dale had been a sales rep for the drug company that sold Goodie headache powders. Dale later left Cartwheel Records to manage Craddock. Dale also managed the group Alabama, making them one of the best country music groups in the history of country music. Dale currently Kenny Chesney’s manager along with Clint Hime.

The position of national promotion manager was filled by Juan Contreras. Ron and Dale met Juan at Kaintuck Territory as a stuntman and gunfighter; his stage name was Johnny Thunderhorse. His employer was Walter Sill, owner of the park. Juan learned promotion by promoting the theme park. Juan was also involved with the United South and Eastern Tribes, along with Bob Ferguson. Bob was a staff producer for RCA, producing Dolly Parton and Porter Wagoner. Survey in organizing a benefit for the organization. Following the purchase by ABC, Dunhill in November 1972, Don Gant, who was an Acuff-Rose executive, was put in charge of the Nashville office. After Contreras left the ABC-owned Cartwheel records he became an assistant to Monument Records president Fred Foster, In that capacity, he assisted artists such as Kris Kristofferson, Larry Gatlin and Billy Swan in their recording careers.

== Artists ==
In 1971, Billy "Crash" Craddock signed with Cartwheel. He had five top ten country singles with the label from 1971 to 1972. They included a remake of "Knock Three Times" and "Dream Lover".

Another artist to join in 1971 was Johnny Darrell. Before the year was out he had a record released with the label.

=== Roster ===
- Billy "Crash" Craddock
- Johnny Darrell
- Duane Dee
- Harold Lee
- Glenn Canyon
- Lewis Pruitt
- Kelso Herston

== See also ==
- List of record labels
