= Easy as Pie (song) =

Single by Billy "Crash" Craddock

from the album Easy as Pie
- B-side: "She's Mine"
- Released: October 18, 1975
- Genre: Country
- Label: ABC/Dot
- Songwriter(s): Rory Bourke, Gene Dobbins, Johnny Wilson

Billy "Crash" Craddock singles chronology
"I Love the Blues and the Boogie Woogie" (1975)	"Easy as Pie" (1975)	"Walk Softly" (1976)

"Easy as Pie" is a song written by Rory Bourke, Gene Dobbins and Johnny Wilson, and recorded by American country music singer Billy "Crash" Craddock. It was released in October 1975 as the first and title track from the album Easy as Pie. The song was a #1 hit on the country charts and was a crossover hit. A live version was also released on 1977's Live! and 2009's Live -N- Kickin'.

== Chart performance ==
Chart (1975–1976)	Peak position
U.S. Billboard Hot 100	54
U.S. Billboard Hot Country Singles	2
U.S. Billboard Easy Listening	44
Canadian RPM Top Singles	81
Canadian RPM Country Tracks	1
Canadian RPM Adult Contemporary	50
