= The Best of Billy "Crash" Craddock (1973 album) =

Greatest hits album by Billy "Crash" Craddock
- Released: 1973
- Recorded: 1966–1968
- Genre: Country
- Label: Chart

Billy "Crash" Craddock chronology
Two Sides of "Crash" (1973)	The Best of Billy "Crash" Craddock (1973)	Billy "Crash" Craddock (1973)

Professional ratings
Review scores
Source	Rating
Allmusic	3/5 stars

The Best of Billy "Crash" Craddock is an album by country singer Billy "Crash" Craddock. A collection of late 1960s recordings from Craddock's brief, unsuccessful stint on Chart, this "Best of" collection did not have a single cut on it that had made the Billboard charts during that period. This album was released in 1973 to cash in on Craddock's current success with several top ten hits on ABC Records and the album managed to hit the Hot Country Albums chart on Billboard peaking at #50. Craddock's stint at Chart was so unprolific that just eight songs had been recorded, requiring the full-length album to be fleshed out with two tracks by "guest artist" Gene Hood. The album was produced by Slim Williamson.

== Track listing ==
1. "There Oughta Be a Law"
2. "Anything That's Part of You"
3. "Two Arms Full of Lonely"
4. "The Love We Live Without"
5. "Never Once" (sung by Gene Hood)
6. "Your Love Is What Is"
7. "Go On Home Girl"
8. "Whipping Boy"
9. "Learning to Live Without You"
10. "There's Gonna Be Lovin'" (sung by Gene Hood)
