= Don't Destroy Me =

Single by "Crash" Craddock

from the album Boom Boom Baby
- B-side: "Boom Boom Baby"
- Released: 1959
- Recorded: 1959
- Genre: Rockabilly
- Length: 2:46
- Label: Columbia; Coronet
- Songwriter(s): Mann/Sharpiro

"Crash" Craddock singles chronology
"Sweetie Pie/Blabbermouth" (1959)	"Don't Destroy Me" (1959)	"I Want That/Since She Turned Seventeen" (1960)

"Don't Destroy Me" is a rockabilly song written by Barry Mann and Joe Sharpiro and recorded by Billy "Crash" Craddock in 1959. "Don't Destroy Me" was his first hit song in the United States, where it stayed on the Billboard Hot 100 chart for one week at No. 94.

"Don't Destroy Me" and the flipside of the record, "Boom Boom Baby", were big hits in Australia in 1959-1960. During the 1970s, Craddock became a popular country singer.
