= Billy "Crash" Craddock (1978 album) =

Studio album by Billy "Crash" Craddock
- Released: 1978
- Recorded: 1977–1978
- Studio: Woodland
- Genre: Country
- Label: Capitol
- Producer: Dale Morris

Professional ratings
Review scores
Source	Rating
AllMusic	2.5/5 stars

Billy "Crash" Craddock is a country album by Billy "Crash" Craddock. It was released on the Capitol label in 1978. Recorded in Nashville, the album was produced by Dale Morris.

The only hit song in the United States was "I Cheated on a Good Woman's Love", which reached No. 4 on the country charts. It also appeared on the soundtrack to the film Convoy. Craddock supported the album with a North American tour.

== Track listing ==
No.	Title	Writer(s)	Length
1.	"I Cheated on a Good Woman's Love"	Del Bryant	2:34
2.	"Jailhouse Rock"	Jerry Leiber/Mike Stoller	2:25
3.	"Roll in My Sweet Baby's Arms"	traditional	2:44
4.	"Rock and Roll Madness"	Bobby Goldsboro	2:21
5.	"You're the Girl"	Linda Darrell	2:52
6.	"I've Been Too Long Lonely Baby"	John Adrian	2:04
7.	"Not a Day Goes By"	John Adrian	3:45
8.	"Blue Eyes Crying in the Rain"	Fred Rose	3:10
9.	"Say You'll Stay Until Tomorrow"	Roger Greenaway/Barry Mason	3:29
10.	"We Never Made It to Chicago"	John Adrian	2:45
