= Easy as Pie (Billy "Crash" Craddock album) =

Studio album by Billy Craddock
- Released: 1976
- Genre: Country
- Label: ABC/Dot Records

Billy Craddock chronology
Still Thinkin' 'Bout You (1975)	Easy as Pie (1976)	Crash (1976)

Singles from Easy as Pie
- 1. "Easy as Pie" Released: October 18, 1975; 2. "Walk Softly" Released: 1976; 3. "You Rubbed It All Wrong" Released: 1976

Easy as Pie is an album by country singer Billy "Crash" Craddock. It was released on ABC/Dot Records in 1976.

== Track listing ==
1. "Easy as Pie" (Rory Bourke, Gene Dobbins, Johnny Wilson)
2. "She's About a Mover"
3. "Think I'll Go Somewhere (And Cry Myself To Sleep)"
4. "You Can't Cry It Away"
5. "Another Woman"
6. "I Need Someone to Love"
7. "Walk Softly" (Van McCoy)
8. "Has A Cat Got A Tail"
9. "The First Time"
10. "You Rubbed It In All Wrong" (John Adrian)
11. "There Won't Be Another Now"
