= Laughing and Crying, Living and Dying =

Studio album by Billy "Crash" Craddock
- Released: 1979
- Recorded: 1978–1979
- Studio: Woodland (Nashville, Tennessee)
- Genre: Country
- Label: Capitol
- Producer: Dale Morris

Laughing and Crying, Living and Dying is a country album by Billy "Crash" Craddock. It was released in 1979 on the Capitol label.

== Track listing ==
1. "My Mama Never Heard Me Sing"
2. "A Hundred Miles an Hour"
3. "'Till I Stop Shaking"
4. "Don't Take Any Wooden Nickels"
5. "As Long as I Live"
6. "One Dream Coming, One Dream Going"
7. "Sneak Out of Love with You"
8. "When I Get Over You"
9. "Robinhood"
10. "Station Wagon Mama (Car Pool Queen)"
