= A Tear Fell =

- Japanese release picture sleeve

Single by Teresa Brewer
- B-side: "Bo Weevil"
- Released: January 1956
- Recorded: 1955
- Studio: Decca Studios, Pythian Temple, New York City
- Genre: Country
- Length: 2:38
- Label: Coral
- Songwriter(s): Eugene Randolph, Dorian Burton
- Producer(s): Dick Jacobs

Teresa Brewer singles chronology
"A Good Man Is Hard to Find" (1955)	"A Tear Fell" (1956)	"A Sweet Old Fashioned Girl" (1956)

"A Tear Fell" is a popular song. It was written by Eugene Randolph and Dorian Burton and released in 1956.

The best-known version of the song was recorded by Teresa Brewer the same year, peaking at number two in the U.K. and #5 in the U.S. The B-side to her single, "Bo Weevil", was also a hit in the U.S. reaching #17 on the pop chart.

== Cover versions ==
- "A Tear Fell" was recorded in the United Kingdom by Jill Day and Edna Savage.
- The song was also covered by the country singer Billy "Crash" Craddock, and became a top ten country hit.
- Ivory Joe Hunter also recorded "A Tear Fell" on 19 November 1955 in New York City, reaching number 15 on the American Billboard R&B chart in March 1956. Ray Charles sang "A Tear Fell", his version entered Cashbox Magazine on July 18, 1964.
- Soul singer Solomon Burke recorded "A Tear Fell" in 1966, releasing the song as a 'B' side to his Christmas single "Presents For Christmas" on Atlantic Records.
