= Sweet Magnolia Blossom =

Single by Billy "Crash" Craddock

from the album Mr. Country Rock
- B-side: "Home Is Such a Lonely Place to Go"
- Released: December 1973
- Genre: Country
- Label: ABC
- Songwriter(s): Rory Bourke
- Producer(s): Ron Chancey

Billy "Crash" Craddock singles chronology
"'Till the Water Stops Runnin'" (1973)	"Sweet Magnolia Blossom" (1973)	"Rub It In" (1974)

"Sweet Magnolia Blossom" is a song recorded by American country music artist Billy "Crash" Craddock. It was released in December 1973 as the third single from his album Mr. Country Rock. The song peaked at number 3 on the Billboard Hot Country Singles chart. It also reached number 1 on the RPM Country Tracks chart in Canada. The song was written by Rory Bourke.

== Chart performance ==
Chart (1973–1974)	Peak position
US Hot Country Songs (Billboard)	3
Canadian RPM Country Tracks	1
