= Broken Down in Tiny Pieces =

Single by Billy "Crash" Craddock

from the album Crash
- Released: October 23, 1976
- Genre: Country
- Length: 3:07
- Label: ABC/Dot
- Songwriter(s): John Adrian
- Producer(s): Ron Chancey

Billy "Crash" Craddock singles chronology
"You Rubbed It in All Wrong" (1976)	"Broken Down in Tiny Pieces" (1976)	"Just a Little Thing" (1977)

"Broken Down in Tiny Pieces" is a song written by John Adrian, and recorded by American country singer Billy "Crash" Craddock, with Janie Fricke performing background vocals on the song. It was released in October 1976 as the first single from the album Crash. The song stayed at number one for one week and spend twelve weeks within the top 40.

== Chart performance ==
Chart (1976–1977)	Peak position
US Hot Country Songs (Billboard)	1
Canadian RPM Country Tracks	2

== Covers ==
- Billy Joe Royal also recorded a version of the song.
