= Knock Three Times =

1970 single by Tony Orlando and Dawn

- 1970 artwork showing a fictional group, not the performers

Single by Dawn

from the album Candida
- B-side: "Home"
- Released: November 1970
- Recorded: 1970
- Genre: Soft rock
- Length: 2:57
- Label: Bell
- Songwriters: Irwin Levine; L. Russell Brown
- Producers: Hank Medress; Dave Appell

Dawn singles chronology
"Candida" (1970)	"Knock Three Times" (1970)	"What Are You Doing Sunday" (1971)

"Knock Three Times" is a popular song credited simply to "Dawn", obscuring the actual performers. It was released as a single which hit No. 1 on the Billboard Hot 100 in January 1971 and eventually sold six million copies. It reached No. 2 on 'Billboard's "Easy Listening" survey. Outside the US, "Knock Three Times" also claimed the No. 1 spot on the UK Singles Chart.

== Background ==
"Knock Three Times" has roots in the Tokens. The first Dawn song "Candida" was produced by Tokens member Hank Medress and his business partner Dave Appell in May 1970 with session musicians and some Tokens members. Medress did not like the sound of the lead singer and replaced him with his friend Tony Orlando who had already enjoyed limited success singing "Bless You" and "Halfway to Paradise" in 1961. By 1970, Orlando had abandoned his singing career and was working as an executive at April-Blackwood Music, a subsidiary of Columbia Records, where he was hoping for a promotion. He worried about the conflict of interest inherent in his recording vocals for a competitor Bell Records, so he only agreed to sing anonymously. "Candida" turned out to be a hit song, and Bell asked Orlando to sing another tune anonymously. Dawn was not an actual musical group at the time; the name was chosen because Bell Records executive Steve Wax had a daughter named Lisa Dawn Wax.

== Recording and release ==
"Candida" co-writer Irwin Levine joined with Larry Brown to write "Knock Three Times". As "Candida" was peaking on the US pop chart in October 1970, Medress brought Orlando back to the studio with backing singers Jay Siegel of the Tokens, Robin Grean, and Toni Wine. Wine remembers Linda November singing on this session. The singers were veterans of the "Candida" recording session, and Wine was co-writer of "Candida" with Levine. They recorded "Knock Three Times" together. This was the first time Orlando met any of the musicians involved with "Candida".

"Knock Three Times" hit No. 1 in January 1971. Bell Records promised Orlando royalties from the song, and he confessed his outside involvement to his employer, who told him it was fine as long as he did not tour, and instructed him to put some April-Blackwood Music songs on the associated album, Candida. Orlando agreed at first, but soon quit his job to begin touring. To promote the song, a touring version of Dawn was needed. Producer Tony Camillo recommended the duo of cousins Telma Hopkins and Joyce Vincent, who expected only a short employment contract as Dawn. The women liked working with Orlando, and after the tour was finished, the three recorded more hit songs as Tony Orlando and Dawn, starting with 1973's "Tie a Yellow Ribbon Round the Ole Oak Tree".

== Personnel ==
Studio session 1970 as Dawn

- Tony Orlando – lead vocals
- Toni Wine – backing vocals
- Jay Siegel – backing vocals
- Robin Grean – backing vocals
- Linda November – backing vocals

Touring group from 1971 billed as Tony Orlando and Dawn

- Tony Orlando – lead vocals
- Telma Hopkins – backing vocals
- Joyce Vincent – backing vocals

== Cover versions ==
"Knock Three Times"

Single by Billy "Crash" Craddock

from the album Knock Three Times
- B-side: "The Best I Ever Had"
- Released: January 1971
- Recorded: November 1970
- Studio: Woodland (Nashville, Tennessee)
- Genre: Country
- Length: 2:57
- Label: Cartwheel
- Songwriters: Irwin Levine; L. Russell Brown
- Producer: Ron Chancey

Billy "Crash" Craddock singles chronology
"Your Love Is What Is" (1968)	"Knock Three Times" (1971)	"Dream Lover" (1971)

The song was covered by Billy "Crash" Craddock in 1971 and became a No. 3 country hit. Craddock's version had a faster tempo and included Cajun fiddles. The song largely introduced Craddock and his country rock-styled sound to a wider country audience, and began a string of hits that continued into the early 1980s.

== Popular culture ==
"Knock Three Times" appears in several motion pictures, including Now and Then.

Several Larry Craig–themed parodies (all titled "Tap Three Times") were recorded by various artists, such as Paul and Storm and the Capitol Steps in 2007, following the senator's sex scandal in which he was arrested for tapping his foot (to allegedly solicit sex) in a public airport restroom.

== Charts ==
=== Weekly charts ===
Chart (1970–1971)	Peak position
Argentina	2
Australia (Kent Music Report)	1
Austria (Ö3 Austria Top 40)	6
Belgium (VRT Top 30 Flanders)	2
Canada (RPM 100 Singles)	1
Ireland (IRMA)	3
Netherlands (Dutch Top 40)	3
New Zealand (Recorded Music NZ)	1
South Africa (Springbok Radio)	1
Switzerland (Schweizer Hitparade)	4
UK Singles Chart	1
US Billboard Hot 100	1
US Easy Listening (Billboard)	2
US Cash Box Top 100	1
West Germany (GfK)	2

=== Year-end charts ===
Chart (1971)	Rank
Australia	7
Canada	11
South Africa	3
UK	4
US Billboard Hot 100	10
US Cash Box Top 100	18

== Certifications ==
Region	Certification	Certified units/sales
New Zealand (RMNZ)	2× Platinum	60,000^{‡}
United States (RIAA)	Gold	1,000,000^{^}
^{^} Shipments figures based on certification alone.^{‡} Sales+streaming figures based on certification alone.
