= Dream Lover =

1959 single by Bobby Darin

Single by Bobby Darin
- B-side: "Bullmoose"
- Released: April 20, 1959
- Genre: Rock and roll, doo-wop, pop
- Length: 2:28
- Label: Atco 45-6140
- Songwriter: Bobby Darin
- Producers: Ahmet Ertegun, Jerry Wexler

Bobby Darin singles chronology
"Plain Jane" (1959)	"Dream Lover" (1959)	"Mack the Knife" (1959)

"Dream Lover" is a song written by American musician Bobby Darin; he recorded his composition on March 5, 1959, and released it as a single the following month. It was produced by Ahmet Ertegun and Jerry Wexler and engineered by Tom Dowd. The song has been widely covered by other singers.

== Background ==
In addition to Darin's vocal, the song features Neil Sedaka on piano. While recording it, Darin decided to stretch out some chord changes he found on the piano and add strings and voices. A picture sleeve, featuring a portrait of Darin, was also issued for this record in the U.S.

== Chart performance ==
It was released as a single on Atco Records in the U.S. in 1959, and became a multimillion seller, reaching number 2 on the Billboard Hot 100 for a week, number 4 on Billboard's Hot R&B Sides chart, and number 5 in Canada. "Dream Lover" was kept from the number-one spot by "The Battle of New Orleans" by Johnny Horton. It did reach number 1, though, on the UK's New Musical Express chart for four weeks during July 1959. The song also reached number 5 on Norway's VG-lista, number 12 in Flanders, and number 21 in Wallonia.

== Certifications ==
Region	Certification	Certified units/sales
Italy	—	100,000
United Kingdom (BPI)	Silver	200,000^{‡}
^{‡} Sales+streaming figures based on certification alone.

== Cover versions ==
In 1971, Billy "Crash" Craddock released his version of "Dream Lover" as a single. Craddock's version reached number 1 on Cash Box's Country Top 65 chart and Record World's Country Singles Chart, while reaching number 5 on Billboard's Hot Country Singles chart. Craddock's version was included on his 1972 album You Better Move On.

In 1979, Ricky Nelson released a cover of "Dream Lover". His version reached number 29 on Billboard's Adult Contemporary chart and number 59 on Billboard's Hot Country Singles chart. He sang the song on his appearance on Saturday Night Live. Also in 1979, Australian Glen Shorrock of Little River Band covered it. It was in the Australian Top 10 for eighteen weeks that year.

Tanya Tucker and Glen Campbell released a duet version in 1980 on the album Dreamlovers. Their version hit number 59 on the US country chart, and number 48 in Canada.
