= Ruby Baby =

Pop-music song written in the 1950s and performed by many artists

Single by Dion

from the album Ruby Baby
- B-side: "He'll Only Hurt You"
- Released: 1963
- Recorded: 1962
- Genre: Rock and roll
- Label: Laurie
- Songwriter: Jerry Leiber and Mike Stoller

Dion singles chronology
"Love Came to Me" (1962)	"Ruby Baby" (1963)	"Sandy" (1963)

"Ruby Baby"

Single by Billy "Crash" Craddock

from the album Rub It In
- B-side: "Walk When Love Walks"
- Released: October 1974
- Recorded: February 1974
- Genre: Country
- Label: ABC 12036
- Songwriter: Jerry Leiber and Mike Stoller
- Producer: Ron Chancey

Billy "Crash" Craddock singles chronology
"Rub It In" (1974)	"Ruby Baby" (1974)	"Still Thinkin' 'Bout You" (1975)

"Ruby Baby" is a song written by Jerry Leiber and Mike Stoller. It was originally recorded by the Drifters. Their version was released as a single by Atlantic Records (catalog No. 45 1089) in 1956. It peaked at No. 10 on the US Hot R&B chart.

== Dion version ==
Columbia Records released a remake by Dion in 1962 (catalog No. 4 42662), which was a worldwide success. The single reached No. 2 on the Billboard Hot 100 and peaked at No. 5 on the R&B chart. In 1963, Dion filmed a promotional music video for "Ruby Baby" in Paris, France. According to Dion himself in a later interview, the video was created as part of an experimental project to play short music films on jukeboxes equipped with television screens. He stated:

"I did that in France, they wanted to put these films on top of jukeboxes, with TV screens, so it was one of the first videos made. It never caught on because you'd have to put a quarter in instead of a dime. And I don't think people wanted to hang around the jukebox watching."

Although the concept did not achieve commercial success, the "Ruby Baby" video is notable as one of the earliest known examples of a music video produced solely to promote a song outside the context of film or television appearances.

== Covers and other versions ==
"Ruby Baby" has been covered by many artists including:

- In 1963 Polydor Records released a cover of Dion's version by Tony Sheridan & The Beat Brothers.
- In 1963, Richard Anthony released a cover in the French language, with lyrics by André Salvet and Claude Carrère via Columbia Records (catalog No. ESRF 1391). It was also on the album Richard Anthony via Columbia Records (catalog No. FPX 234) for France, Canada and Italy.
- The Beach Boys released a version on the band's 1993 box set, Good Vibrations: Thirty Years of The Beach Boys, as an outtake from the 1965 Beach Boys' Party! album. There was also a version recorded for their 1976 "comeback" album, 15 Big Ones, which was released on We Gotta Groove: The Brother Studio Years in 2026.
- In 1974, Billy Craddock released a cover that was a No. 1 country hit. This version was included the album Rub It In. This version crossed over to No. 33 on the Hot 100. It was also released on his 2009 live album Live -N- Kickin'.
- Bobby Darin released a version on the LP 18 Yellow Roses & 11 Other Hits via Capitol Records (catalog No. ST 1942) in 1963.
- Donald Fagen of Steely Dan recorded a version on his 1982 solo album The Nightfly.
- Ronnie Hawkins recorded a version on April 13, 1959 with The Hawks. It was released on the LP Ronnie Hawkins by Roulette Records (catalog No. SR 25078) in August 1959.
- Del Shannon released a version on the LP Handy Man by Amy Records (mono catalog No. 8003-M and stereo No. 8003-S) in 1964.
- John Woolley and Just Born released a version during August 1969, which spent 13 weeks on Belgium's Hit Parade in 1970.
- Australian band Ol' 55 released a version as the fourth single from their third studio album Cruisin' for a Bruisin' (1978). The song peaked at No. 36 on the Australian Kent Music Report.
