= Ron Chancey =

American record producer

Ron Chancey (born August 6, 1935) is a record producer who works primarily in the country music field. He has produced albums and songs by The Oak Ridge Boys, and produced Jeris Ross and Billy "Crash" Craddock. Chancey also served as the head of artists and repertoire at MCA Nashville in the 1980s.

His son, Blake, is a record producer as well.
