= Billy "Crash" Craddock =

American country and rockabilly singer (born 1939)

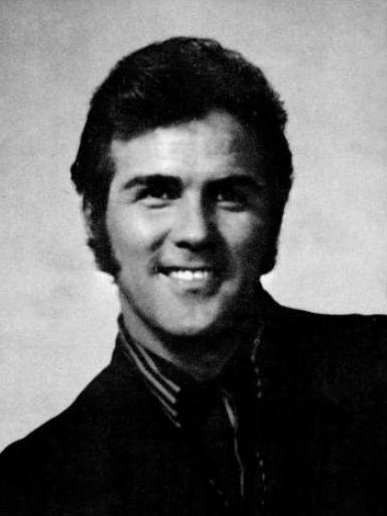
- Craddock in 1971

Background information
- Born: Billy Wayne Craddock; June 16, 1939 (age 87); Greensboro, North Carolina, U.S.
- Genres: Country, rockabilly
- Occupation: Singer
- Years active: 1957–present
- Labels: Sky Castle (1957); Colonial (1957); Date (1958); Columbia (1958–1961); Mercury (1961–1962); King (1964–1965); Chart (1966–1968); Cartwheel (1971–1972); ABC (1973–1978); Capitol (1978–1983); Cee Cee (1983, 2006); MCA (1986); Atlantic (1989)
- Website: www.bccofficial.com

Billy Wayne "Crash" Craddock (born June 16, 1939) is an American country and rockabilly singer. He first gained popularity in Australia in the 1950s with a string of rockabilly hits, including the Australian number-one hits "Boom Boom Baby" and "One Last Kiss" in 1960 and 1961, respectively. Switching to country music, he gained popularity in the United States in the 1970s with a string of top-10 country hits, several of which were number ones, including "Rub It In", "Broken Down in Tiny Pieces", and "Ruby Baby". Craddock is known to his fans as "the King of Country Rock Music" and "Mr. Country Rock" for his up-tempo, rockabilly-influenced style of country music.

== Biography ==
=== Early life ===
Billy Wayne Craddock was born in Greensboro, North Carolina, United States. He learned how to play guitar from his oldest brother when he was six. At age 11, he entered a local television talent contest and was voted top winner for 15 consecutive weeks. Craddock received the nickname "Crash" while playing running back for the Rankin High School football team. After he left high school, he formed a rockabilly band with one of his brothers called the Four Rebels. His early influences included Little Jimmy Dickens, Ray Price, and Hank Williams.

=== Early career ===
Craddock's first release was "Smacky-Mouth", which was recorded in 1957 for the local Greensboro Sky Castle label. He released his next single, titled "Birddoggin'", on Colonial Records. It was also released in 1957.

He soon got a deal with Columbia's Date Records. He released "Ah, Poor Little Baby" with no success. The song was covered in the UK by Adam Faith. He began recording for Columbia Records in 1958, recording rockabilly and pop tunes. He was marketed as a teen idol by Columbia, as they needed an artist to compete with Elvis Presley. He appeared twice on American Bandstand, but failed to have a hit in the U.S. His only song that charted in the 1950s in the U.S. was "Don't Destroy Me", which peaked at number 94 for one week in November 1959. He also became popular in Australia, recording some songs that became synonymous with other artists. He recorded "Am I to Be the One" and "I Want That", which were covered most notably by Jerry Lee Lewis and British rockers Johnny Kidd and the Pirates.

In 1960, Craddock toured Australia on two occasions. The first was in February with Duane Eddy, The Diamonds, Santo & Johnny, and Floyd Robinson and the second was in May with Bobby Rydell, The Everly Brothers, Marv Johnson, and the Crickets. He did not know how popular he was in the country and did not think that anyone would recognize him there. When the plane arrived at the airport, thousands of screaming teenagers greeted him. Craddock was unaware that he had the number-one record in the country ("Boom Boom Baby" was number one for four weeks between late February and early March 1960). He soon became the most popular teen idol in the country and is still popular today, scoring a second number one in March 1961 with his cover/co-charted version of "One Last Kiss", also charting at the same time with the Bobby Vee version, becoming his fourth and final top-10 entry in Australia after "I Want That" (HP-7, peaked in late February 1960) and "Well, Don't You Know" (HP-8, peaked in late May 1960)

After his hits in Australia, he recorded one album and several singles during the 1960s. "I'm Tore Up" was released in 1964 on King Records. He released two singles with Mercury Records in the early 1960s. He then went on to record several singles with the Chart label with no success.

=== Success in the States ===
Craddock spent several years out of the music business while working in a cigarette factory and hanging drywall. He soon returned to recording, now as a country singer. He signed with Cartwheel Records in 1969. He soon had his first number-one hit with a cover of the Tony Orlando and Dawn pop hit "Knock Three Times" in 1971. His version was faster and included Cajun fiddles.

The song also reached the top five of the Billboard Hot Country Singles chart that spring, beginning a streak of hits that continued throughout the 1970s. Other hits he had for Cartwheel, all during 1971 and 1972, included "Dream Lover", "You Better Move On", "Ain't Nothin' Shakin' (But the Leaves on The Trees)", and "I'm Gonna Knock on Your Door", were all top-10 hits in 1971 and 1972.

Craddock consistently hit the country top 10 in the 1970s, and he became one of country music's first male sex symbols, unusually handsome for a male country star of the era and dressed in stage clothes exposing his hairy, muscular chest as he growled his way through rocking numbers and love songs, with a stage persona strongly influenced by Elvis Presley.

In 1973, Craddock signed with ABC Records (later ABC/Dot Records), where he enjoyed his biggest hits. One was "Sweet Magnolia Blossom", but his biggest hit, 1974's "Rub It In", was also a top-20 pop hit, as well as his highest charting hit overall on the U.S. pop charts. The song was the first of three number-one country hits for Craddock in Billboard. Several bars from the song are featured in commercials for Glade Plug-In products in recent years. Craddock's follow-up, a remake of Dion's old pop hit, "Ruby Baby", was another major country hit and became his second top-40 pop hit, helping make Craddock briefly the American pop/rock star he had tried to be almost 15 years before. In 1975, he released Still Thinkin' 'bout You, which went top 10 as both a single and album on the country charts, but failed to get any major pop action. His last pop success was 1976's "Easy as Pie" which peaked at number 54 on the Billboard Hot 100 and hit number one on the country chart.

He moved to Capitol Records in 1977, where he had his last two top-10 hits: "I Cheated on a Good Woman's Love" (1978) and "If I Could Write a Song as Beautiful as You" (1979). His singles began to be less successful in the early 1980s, though he occasionally still cracked the top 30. Craddock recorded several albums for Capitol before leaving the label in 1983. He briefly owned his own small record label, Cee Cee Records, and released one single in 1983 that made the lower end on the national country charts.

=== Later career ===
In 1986, he recorded an album for MCA Records (which purchased ABC/Dot Records in 1979), titled Crash Craddock. He moved to Atlantic Records in 1989, and released Back on Track. The album yielded one minor hit, "Just Another Miserable Day Here in Paradise", which reached number 68 on the chart.

Craddock was inducted into the North Carolina Music Hall of Fame in 2011.

=== Releases on CD ===
Craddock has released several new CDs, including an album of Christmas songs, entitled Christmas Favorites, a Gospel collection, and the 2009 full-band live album, Live -n- Kickin'.

British label Humphead Records released a double-CD anthology with 50 songs, which compiled Craddock's key hits and album cuts from 1971 to 1989.

== Discography ==
- I'm Tore Up (1964)
- Knock Three Times (1971)
- You Better Move On (1972)
- Two Sides of "Crash" (1973)
- Mr. Country Rock (1973)
- Rub It In (1974)
- Still Thinkin' 'bout You (1975)
- Easy as Pie (1976)
- Crash (1976)
- Singing Is Believing (1978)
- Billy "Crash" Craddock (1978)
- Turning Up and Turning On (1978)
- Laughing and Crying, Living and Dying (1979)
- Changes (1980)
- The New Will Never Wear Off of You (1982)
- Crash Craddock (1986)
- Back on Track (1989)
- Christmas Favorites (2006)
- Paint Your Toes (2021)

== Awards ==
- 1972: Music City News Country: Most Promising Male Artist of the Year

== Personal life ==
Billy Craddock is the paternal grandfather of Rachel Craddock, a cohost of the "2 Guys Named Chris" radio show on WKRR.
