= 1972 in music =

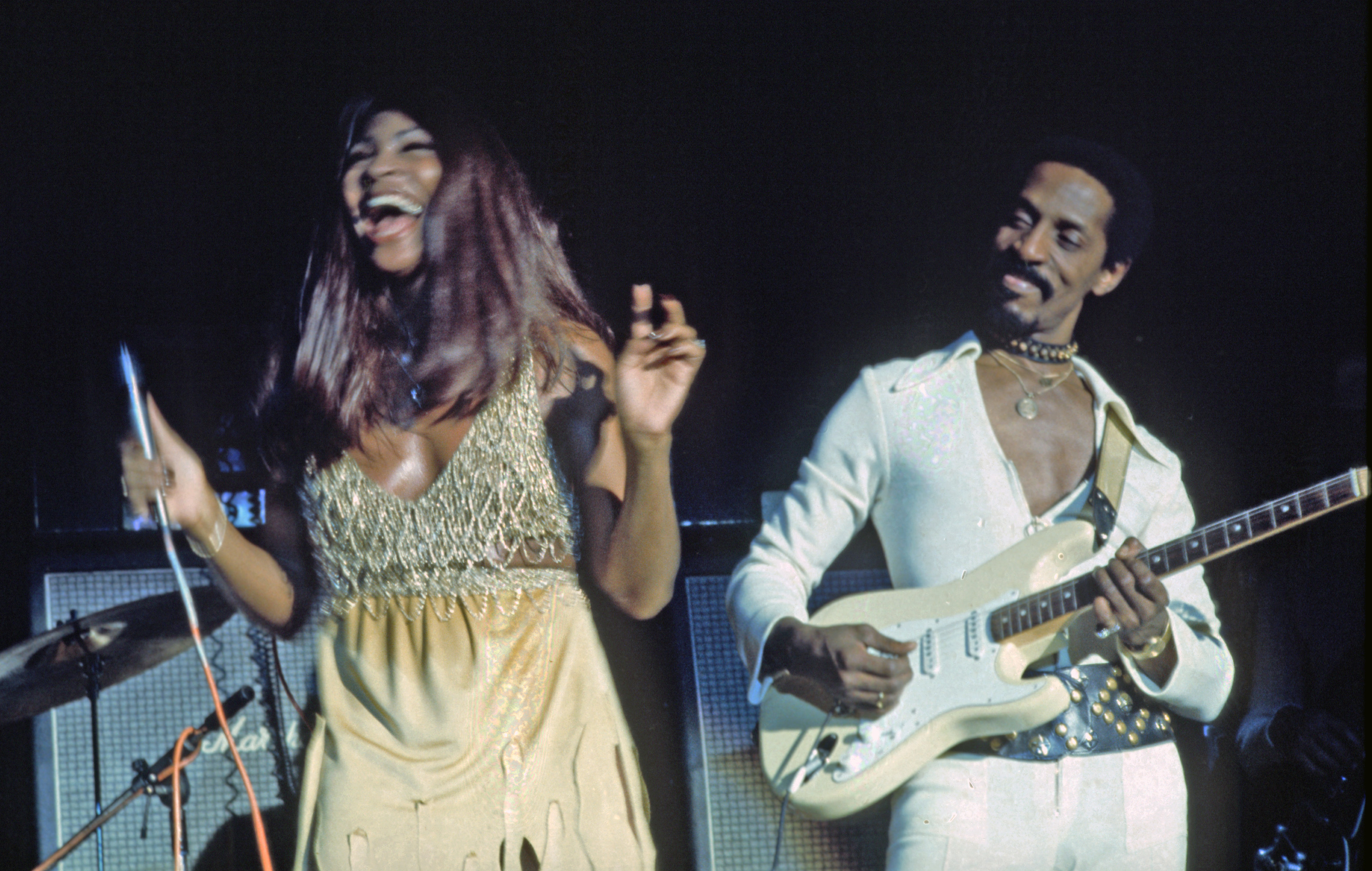
Ike & Tina Turner in 1972

This is a list of notable events in music that took place in the year 1972.

== Specific locations ==
- 1972 in British music
- 1972 in Japanese music
- 1972 in Norwegian music
- 1972 in Scandinavian music

== Specific genres ==
- 1972 in country music
- 1972 in heavy metal music
- 1972 in jazz
- 1972 in progressive rock

== Events ==
- January 17 – 12 miles of U.S. Highway 51 in Memphis, Tennessee, from South Parkway East to the Tennessee/Mississippi state line, is renamed "Elvis Presley Boulevard."
- January 20 – The first live performance of Pink Floyd's Dark Side of the Moon at The Dome, Brighton, is halted by technical problems. Dark Side of the Moon would be played in its entirety the following night, but it would be a full year before the album was released.
- January 21 – Keith Richards jumps on stage to jam with Chuck Berry at the Hollywood Palladium, but is ordered off for playing too loud. Berry later claims that he did not recognize Keith and would not have removed him if he had.
- January 29–31 – The first Sunbury Music Festival is held in Sunbury, Victoria. Performers include Billy Thorpe & The Aztecs, Wendy Saddington, Chain and the La De Da's.
- January 31 – Over 40,000 mourners file past Mahalia Jackson's open casket to pay their respects in Chicago's Great Salem Baptist Church.
- February 9 – Paul McCartney's new band, Wings, make their live debut at the University of Nottingham in England. This is McCartney's first public concert since The Beatles' 1966 US tour.
- February 10 – David Bowie introduces his Ziggy Stardust persona at the second show of the 1972–73 Ziggy Stardust Tour, at The Toby Jug pub, Tolworth, Surrey (England).
- February 13 – Led Zeppelin's concert in Singapore is canceled when government officials will not let them off the airplane because of their long hair.
- February 14–18 – John Lennon and Yoko Ono co-host an entire week of The Mike Douglas Show.
- February 15 – The United States gives federal copyright protection to sound recordings. Prior to this, phonograph records were only protected at state level, and not in all states.
- February 19 – Paul McCartney's single "Give Ireland Back to the Irish" (inspired by the "Bloody Sunday" massacre in Ireland on January 30, 1972) is banned by the BBC. The controversy caused by the banning only increases the song's popularity and it ends up in the Top 20 in England.
- February 23 – Elvis and Priscilla Presley separate.
- February 29 – John Lennon's U.S. immigration visa expires, beginning his three-and-a-half-year fight to remain in the country.
- March 15 – At the 14th Annual Grammy Awards, hosted by Andy Williams, winners include Carole King, Kris Kristofferson, Colin Davis, Michel LeGrand, Isaac Hayes, Julian Bream, Vladimir Horowitz, the Juilliard String Quartet and Bill Withers. King wins Album of the Year (for Tapestry), Record of the Year (for "It's Too Late") and Song of the Year (for "You've Got a Friend"), while Carly Simon wins Best New Artist.
- March 21 – Terry Knight announces he is launching a $5 million lawsuit against Grand Funk's new manager John Eastman, one week after being fired as the band's manager himself. It triggers a series of suits and counter-suits between Knight and the band throughout the coming months.
- March 25 – The 17th Eurovision Song Contest, held in the Usher Hall, Edinburgh, Scotland, is won by German-based Greek singer Vicky Leandros, representing Luxembourg with the song "Après Toi". The song is subsequently released around Europe, having been recorded in several languages, including in English as Come What May.
- March 31 – Official Beatles fan club closes down.
- April 2 – John Lennon and Yoko Ono hold a press conference in New York. The Lennons discuss their appeal against the US Immigration Department's decision to deport John.
- April 9 – First solo concert of Valery Leontiev.
- April 29 – New York City mayor John Lindsay announces that he is supporting John Lennon and Yoko Ono in their fight to remain in the United States.
- May 2 – Stone the Crows lead guitarist Les Harvey is electrocuted on stage during a show in Swansea, Wales, by touching a poorly connected microphone. Harvey dies in a hospital a few hours later. The band's lead singer, Maggie Bell, Harvey's longtime girlfriend, is also hospitalized, having collapsed on stage after the incident.
- May 8 – Billy Preston becomes the first rock performer to headline at New York's Radio City Music Hall
- May 27 – The Opryland USA country music theme park opens in Nashville, Tennessee.
- June – Founding member Roy Wood leaves the Electric Light Orchestra line-up just as the band scores its first hit single..
- June 10 – Elvis Presley does the first of four concerts at the Madison Square Garden in New York City. He sells out all the shows in one day.
- June 14 – Simon & Garfunkel reunite briefly to perform live at Madison Square Garden at a campaign benefit for Democratic presidential candidate George McGovern. Other performers include Peter, Paul and Mary and Dionne Warwick.
- July 24 – Bobby Ramirez, drummer for Edgar Winter's White Trash, is beaten to death in a Chicago bar fight, reportedly because his hair is too long.
- August 5 – Clive Davis signs Aerosmith to Columbia Records at Max's Kansas City in New York City.
- August 30 – John Lennon and Yoko Ono headline the "One To One Concert" at Madison Square Garden to benefit mentally handicapped children. Elephant's Memory, Roberta Flack, Stevie Wonder and Sha Na Na also perform.
- September 1–7 – Karlheinz Stockhausen directs performances of his works at the Shiraz Arts Festival, including Mantra, Hymnen, an all-day performance of Aus den sieben Tagen, and world premieres of two compositions from Für kommende Zeiten
- September 21 – ABC premieres the new TV series In Concert. The first episode features Alice Cooper.
- September 29 – Miles Davis unveils his new nine-piece band at the Lincoln Center Philharmonic Hall.
- October 12 – Diana Ross makes her acting debut in the successful film Lady Sings the Blues, winning her first Academy Award nomination for Best Actress.
- November 3 – James Taylor and Carly Simon are married in a tiny ceremony in Simon's Manhattan apartment.
- November 12 – 51,778 fans pack San Diego Stadium for a concert promoted by KGB-AM to see J. Geils Band, Quicksilver Messenger Service, Foghat and Dr. Hook and the Medicine Show.
- November 25 – The 1st OTI Festival, held at the Palacio de Exposiciones y Congresos, in Madrid, Spain, is won by the song "Diálogo", written by Paulo César Pinheiro and Baden Powell, and performed by Tobias and Claudia Regina representing Brazil.
- November 26 – Family, touring North America as the warmup act for Elton John, play their last concert on U.S. soil in St. Petersburg, Florida.
- December 23 – Grand Funk Railroad, completing its 1972 Tour, with a sold-out concert at NYC's Madison Square Garden, with the proceeds from the concert benefiting the Phoenix House Drug Rehabilitation Program, and with the show being filmed for ABC-TV's "In Concert" Series, the band is met by a lawsuit taken out by their former manager, Terry Knight, who attempts to block the show from going on, attempting to seize their equipment. A court injunction is given later in the day, allowing the concert to take place.
- December 31 – The first New Year's Rockin' Eve, with host Dick Clark, airs on NBC (before moving to ABC) with Three Dog Night as the featured act. Blood, Sweat & Tears, Helen Reddy and Al Green also perform.
- unknown date
  - Herbert Howells becomes a Companion of Honour.
  - Billy Ray Hearn founds Myrrh Records.
  - Joseph Hoo Kim founds Channel One Studios in Kingston, Jamaica.
  - Numa Labinsky (bass singer) and the brothers Michael and Gerald Reynolds found Nimbus Records, a specialist classical music recording company at Wyastone Leys in Herefordshire, England.
  - Heisei College of Music is established in Mifune, Kumamoto, Japan.

== Bands formed ==
- See Musical groups established in 1972

== Bands disbanded ==
- Creedence Clearwater Revival
- Jefferson Airplane
- Martha and the Vandellas
- MC5
- Them
- The Velvet Underground

== Albums released ==
=== January ===
Day	Album	Artist	Notes
3	The Right Combination / Burning the Midnight Oil	Porter Wagoner and Dolly Parton	-
7	Jamming with Edward!	The Rolling Stones, Nicky Hopkins, Ry Cooder	-
10	I've Found Someone of My Own	The Free Movement	Debut
17	Lead Me On	Conway Twitty and Loretta Lynn	-
17	Linda Ronstadt	Linda Ronstadt	-
20	Garcia	Jerry Garcia	Solo Debut
24	Cass Elliot	Cass Elliot	-
24	Got to Be There	Michael Jackson	Solo Debut
24	Paul Simon	Paul Simon	-
24	Young, Gifted and Black	Aretha Franklin	-
31	Let's Stay Together	Al Green	-
-	Blue Öyster Cult	Blue Öyster Cult	Debut
-	1+1	Grin	-
-	All the Good Times	Nitty Gritty Dirt Band	-
-	America	America	Debut
-	Baby I'm-a Want You	Bread	-
-	Flash	Flash	Debut
-	Greenhouse	Leo Kottke	-
-	Halfnelson	Sparks	as Halfnelson; Debut
-	Hendrix in the West	Jimi Hendrix	Live 1969–70
-	I'm the One	Annette Peacock	-
-	Into the Purple Valley	Ry Cooder	-
-	Jackson Browne	Jackson Browne	Debut
-	Keep the Faith	Black Oak Arkansas	-
-	Kraftwerk 2	Kraftwerk	-
-	Loose	Crazy Horse	-
-	Malo	Malo	Debut
-	Phase III	The Osmonds	-
-	Rockpile	Dave Edmunds	Solo Debut
-	Sex, Dope, Rock'n'Roll: Teenage Heaven	Daddy Cool	Australia
-	Solid Rock	The Temptations	-
-	The Spotlight Kid	Captain Beefheart	-
-	The Unnamables	Magma	as Univeria Zekt
-	Weird Scenes Inside the Gold Mine	The Doors	Compilation

=== February ===
Day	Album	Artist	Notes
1	Something/Anything?	Todd Rundgren	-
8	Root Down	Jimmy Smith	-
9	Lonesome Crow	Scorpions	Debut
12	Eat a Peach	The Allman Brothers Band	-
15	Harvest	Neil Young	-
18	Manfred Mann's Earth Band	Manfred Mann's Earth Band	Debut
18	Hellbound Train	Savoy Brown	-
20	Elvis Now	Elvis Presley	-
25	Pink Moon	Nick Drake	-
-	The World of Genius Hans	Moving Gelatine Plates	-
-	All I Ever Need Is You	Sonny & Cher	-
-	Blue River	Eric Andersen	-
-	Border Lord	Kris Kristofferson	-
-	Burgers	Hot Tuna	-
-	Cherish	David Cassidy	Solo Debut
-	Dinnertime	Alex Taylor	-
-	Don Quixote	Gordon Lightfoot	-
-	Fanny Hill	Fanny	-
-	Forgotten Songs and Unsung Heroes	John Kay	Solo Debut
-	Good Hearted Woman	Waylon Jennings	-
-	Grave New World	Strawbs	-
-	Greatest Hits	Blood, Sweat & Tears	Compilation
-	Headkeeper	Dave Mason	-
-	Oh How We Danced	Jim Capaldi	Solo Debut
-	Pain	Ohio Players	-
-	Rockin'	The Guess Who	-
-	Silver Pistol	Brinsley Schwarz	-
-	Tantamount to Treason Vol. 1	Michael Nesmith	-

=== March ===
Day	Album	Artist	Notes
3	Black Magic	Martha Reeves and the Vandellas	-
3	Glitter	Gary Glitter	Debut
3	Thick as a Brick	Jethro Tull	-
3	Music of My Mind	Stevie Wonder	-
6	Bare Trees	Fleetwood Mac	-
10	Shades of a Blue Orphanage	Thin Lizzy	-
10	Touch Your Woman	Dolly Parton	-
21	Love Theme from "The Godfather"	Andy Williams	-
24	Slade Alive!	Slade	Live
24	Coming Together	New Birth	-
30	Machine Head	Deep Purple	-
-	Alvin Lee and Company	Ten Years After	Compilation
-	The Ballad of Calico	Kenny Rogers and the First Edition	-
-	Bobby Whitlock	Bobby Whitlock	Solo Debut
-	Clube da Esquina	Milton Nascimento and Lo Borges	-
-	Cold Blue Excursion	Ray Dorset	Solo Debut
-	D&B Together	Delaney and Bonnie	-
-	Drowning in the Sea of Love	Joe Simon	
-	Ennea	Chase	-
-	Feedback	Spirit	-
-	Heads & Tales	Harry Chapin	Debut
-	Just Another Band from L.A.	Frank Zappa and The Mothers	Live
-	The Killer Rocks On	Jerry Lee Lewis	-
-	The Kink Kronikles	The Kinks	US; Compilation
-	Live Cream Volume II	Cream	Live 1968
-	Powerglide	New Riders of the Purple Sage	-
-	Pure Prairie League	Pure Prairie League	Debut
-	Recall the Beginning...A Journey from Eden	Steve Miller Band	-
-	Roadwork	Edgar Winter's White Trash	-
-	Shopping Bag	The Partridge Family	-
-	Smokin'	Humble Pie	-
-	Space and First Takes	Lee Michaels	-
-	Stories We Could Tell	The Everly Brothers	-
-	You Are the Music...We're Just the Band	Trapeze	-

=== April ===
Day	Album	Artist	Notes
4	Rio Grande Mud	ZZ Top	-
5	Graham Nash David Crosby	Crosby & Nash	Debut
10	Raspberries	Raspberries	Debut
11	Mardi Gras	Creedence Clearwater Revival	-
12	Manassas	Stephen Stills and Manassas	-
14	Three Friends	Gentle Giant	UK
20	Dr. John's Gumbo	Dr. John	-
24	Number 1 Record	Big Star	Debut
28	Argus	Wishbone Ash	-
-	Matching Mole	Matching Mole	Debut
-	Annie	Anne Murray	-
-	Arthur Alexander	Arthur Alexander	-
-	Bolan Boogie	T. Rex	Compilation
-	Comin' Thru	Quicksilver Messenger Service	-
-	He Touched Me	Elvis Presley	-
-	Henry the Human Fly	Richard Thompson	Solo Debut
-	Hobo's Lullaby	Arlo Guthrie	-
-	The Island of Real	The Rascals	-
-	Kossoff, Kirke, Tetsu and Rabbit	Kossoff, Kirke, Tetsu and Rabbit	-
-	A Lonely Man	The Chi-Lites	-
-	Merrimack County	Tom Rush	-
-	Moonshot	Buffy Sainte-Marie	-
-	Mountain Live: The Road Goes Ever On	Mountain	Live
-	On Record	April Wine	-
-	Phantasmagoria	Curved Air	-
-	A Possible Projection of the Future / Childhood's End	Al Kooper	-
-	Procol Harum Live: In Concert with the Edmonton Symphony Orchestra	Procol Harum	Live
-	Roberta Flack & Donny Hathaway	Roberta Flack and Donny Hathaway	-
-	A Thing Called Love	Johnny Cash	-
-	You Don't Mess Around with Jim	Jim Croce	-

=== May ===
Day	Album	Artist	Notes
1	Jeff Beck Group	Jeff Beck	US
1	Still Bill	Bill Withers	-
2	Brother, Brother, Brother	The Isley Brothers	-
11	Cabbage Alley	The Meters	-
15	Carl and the Passions – "So Tough"	The Beach Boys	-
17	Lookin' Through the Windows	The Jackson 5	-
19	Demons and Wizards	Uriah Heep	-
19	Honky Château	Elton John	-
19	Waterloo Lily	Caravan	-
22	America Eats Its Young	Funkadelic	-
26	Exile on Main St.	The Rolling Stones	-
26	I Sing the Body Electric	Weather Report	-
26	Wind of Change	Peter Frampton	Solo debut
30	Live at Max's Kansas City	The Velvet Underground	Live 1970
30	Understanding	Bobby Womack	-
-	Live in Europe	Rory Gallagher	
-	Lou Reed	Lou Reed	Solo debut
-	Ace	Bob Weir	Solo debut
-	Bloodrock Live	Bloodrock	Live
-	Chameleon	The Four Seasons	-
-	Colors of the Day	Judy Collins	Compilation
-	Come from the Shadows	Joan Baez	-
-	Floy Joy	The Supremes	-
-	In Concert	Janis Joplin	Live 1968 and 1970
-	Last of the Red Hot Burritos	The Flying Burrito Brothers	Live
-	People ... Hold On	Eddie Kendricks	-
-	Roy Orbison Sings	Roy Orbison	-
-	Sail Away	Randy Newman	-
-	Sailin' Shoes	Little Feat	-
-	Skies of America	Ornette Coleman	-
-	Tell Me This Is a Dream	The Delfonics	-

=== June ===
Day	Album	Artist	Notes
1	Amazing Grace	Aretha Franklin	Live
1	Eagles	Eagles	Debut
2	Obscured by Clouds	Pink Floyd	-
2	Space Shanty	Khan	Debut
5	The Osmonds Live	The Osmonds	Live
6	Looking Glass	Looking Glass	Debut
9	Earthbound	King Crimson	Live
9	There It Is	James Brown	-
10	Moon Shadow	LaBelle	-
12	Some Time in New York City	John Lennon and Yoko Ono	US
13	School's Out	Alice Cooper	-
13	A Song for You	Carpenters	-
14	Simon and Garfunkel's Greatest Hits	Simon & Garfunkel	Compilation
15	Album III	Loudon Wainwright III	-
16	Roxy Music	Roxy Music	Debut
16	The Rise and Fall of Ziggy Stardust and the Spiders from Mars	David Bowie	-
16	Together	Golden Earring	-
20	Syreeta	Syreeta	Debut
23	Trilogy	Emerson, Lake & Palmer	-
23	Living in the Past	Jethro Tull	Compilation
26	Carney	Leon Russell	-
-	As Recorded at Madison Square Garden	Elvis Presley	Live
-	Dead Forever...	Buffalo	Debut
-	666	Aphrodite's Child	-
-	Blues Roots	Ike Turner	-
-	Free at Last	Free	-
-	If an Angel Came to See You, Would You Make Her Feel at Home?	Black Oak Arkansas	-
-	Let Me Tell You About a Song	Merle Haggard	-

=== July ===
Day	Album	Artist	Notes
1	All the King's Horses	Grover Washington Jr.	-
4	American Gothic	David Ackles	-
5	Waka/Jawaka	Frank Zappa	-
7	The Harder They Come	Jimmy Cliff	Soundtrack
10	Chicago V	Chicago	-
10	Son of Schmilsson	Harry Nilsson	-
11	Super Fly	Curtis Mayfield	Soundtrack
20	Long John Silver	Jefferson Airplane	-
20	Straight Shooter	James Gang	-
21	I Can See Clearly Now	Johnny Nash	-
21	Never a Dull Moment	Rod Stewart	-
21	The Slider	T. Rex	-
27	All Directions	The Temptations	-
27	Flying High Together	Smokey Robinson & The Miracles	-
–	Seven Separate Fools	Three Dog Night	-
–	Toulouse Street	The Doobie Brothers	-
–	The Academy in Peril	John Cale	-
–	Captain Beyond	Captain Beyond	Debut
–	Feel Good	Ike & Tina Turner	-
–	Exercises	Nazareth	-
–	Foghat	Foghat	Debut
–	Music Is the Message	Kool & the Gang	-
–	Saint Dominic's Preview	Van Morrison	-
–	Moods	Neil Diamond	-
–	Someplace Else Now	Lesley Gore	-
–	Sparks	Sparks	Debut under final name

=== August ===
Day	Album	Artist	Notes
1	Back Stabbers	The O'Jays	-
2	Jazz at Santa Monica Civic '72	Ella Fitzgerald	Live
4	Ben	Michael Jackson	-
7	America: A 200-Year Salute in Story and Song	Johnny Cash	-
15	Full Circle	The Doors	-
15	Rock of Ages	The Band	Live
25	Everybody's in Show-Biz	The Kinks	Double LP; one studio, one live
25	Harold Melvin & the Blue Notes	Harold Melvin & the Blue Notes	Debut
28	'Ot 'n' Sweaty	Cactus	-
31	Styx	Styx	Debut
-	Elf	Elf	Debut
-	And the Hits Just Keep on Comin'	Michael Nesmith	-
-	Free Will	Gil Scott-Heron	-
-	Irrlicht	Klaus Schulze	Debut
-	Live at the Paramount	The Guess Who	Live
-	Roy Buchanan	Roy Buchanan	-
-	Smokin' O.P.'s	Bob Seger	-
-	Zeit	Tangerine Dream	-

=== September ===
Day	Album	Artist	Notes
8	Close to the Edge	Yes	
8	All the Young Dudes	Mott the Hoople	-
9	Summer Breeze	Seals and Crofts	-
10	Liza with a Z	Liza Minnelli	Soundtrack
11	Together Always	Porter Wagoner and Dolly Parton	-
15	Foxtrot	Genesis	-
15	Below the Salt	Steeleye Span	-
15	Phoenix	Grand Funk Railroad	-
15	Rocky Mountain High	John Denver	-
25	Vol. 4	Black Sabbath	-
26	Live Full House	The J. Geils Band	Live
27	Catch Bull at Four	Cat Stevens	-
29	Glorified Magnified	Manfred Mann's Earth Band	-
-	At Home with Their Greatest Hits	The Partridge Family	Compilation
-	Bandstand	Family	-
-	Bright Phoebus	Lal and Mike Waterson	-
-	Give It Up	Bonnie Raitt	-
-	Ladies Love Outlaws	Waylon Jennings	-
-	The Late Great Townes Van Zandt	Townes Van Zandt	-
-	My Time	Boz Scaggs	-
-	Nervous on the Road	Brinsley Schwarz	-
-	Rolling Thunder	Mickey Hart	Solo debut
-	Sandy	Sandy Denny	-
-	Solomon's Seal	Pentangle	-
-	Squawk	Budgie	-
-	Tequila Sunrise	David Clayton-Thomas	-

=== October ===
Day	Album	Artist	Notes
2	My Favorite Songwriter: Porter Wagoner	Dolly Parton	-
4	Willie Remembers	Rare Earth	-
9	Heavy Cream	Cream	Compilation
11	Caravanserai	Santana	-
11	On the Corner	Miles Davis	-
23	I'm Still in Love with You	Al Green	-
25	A Good Feelin' to Know	Poco	-
27	Talking Book	Stevie Wonder	-
-	Matching Mole's Little Red Record	Matching Mole	
-	War Heroes	Jimi Hendrix	-
-	At Crooked Lake	Crazy Horse	-
-	Back to Front	Gilbert O'Sullivan	-
-	Barnstorm	Joe Walsh	Debut
-	Music Is My Life	Billy Preston	-
-	Crazy Horses	The Osmonds	-
-	Bustin' Out	Pure Prairie League	-
-	Clear Spot	Captain Beefheart	-
-	Expectations	Keith Jarrett	-
-	Glen Travis Campbell	Glen Campbell	-
-	Greetings from L.A.	Tim Buckley	-
-	Guitar Man	Bread	-
-	Lady Sings the Blues	Diana Ross	Soundtrack
-	The Lady's Not for Sale	Rita Coolidge	-
-	Last Days and Time	Earth, Wind & Fire	-
-	Live Concert at the Forum	Barbra Streisand	Live
-	Loggins and Messina	Loggins and Messina	-
-	The London Chuck Berry Sessions	Chuck Berry	-
-	Made in England	Atomic Rooster	-
-	The Moviegoer	Scott Walker	-
-	New Blood	Blood, Sweat & Tears	-
-	Passin' Thru	James Gang	-
-	Rhymes & Reasons	Carole King	-
-	Rock & Roll Music to the World	Ten Years After	-
-	Round 2	The Stylistics	-
-	Sniper and Other Love Songs	Harry Chapin	-
-	Stealers Wheel	Stealers Wheel	Debut
-	To Whom It May Concern	Bee Gees	-
-	Who Came First	Pete Townshend	Solo debut
-	A Woofer in Tweeter's Clothing	Sparks	US

=== November ===
Day	Album	Artist	Notes
1	Burning Love and Hits from His Movies, Volume 2	Elvis Presley	Compilation
1	One Man Dog	James Taylor	-
3	Whistle Rymes	John Entwistle	-
5	Europe '72	Grateful Dead	Live
7	The Divine Miss M	Bette Midler	-
7	Journey Through the Past	Neil Young	Soundtrack
8	Transformer	Lou Reed	-
10	Baby James Harvest	Barclay James Harvest	-
10	The Best of The Byrds: Greatest Hits, Volume II	The Byrds	Compilation
10	See All Her Faces	Dusty Springfield	-
13	Fresh	Raspberries	-
15	Homecoming	America	-
17	Seventh Sojourn	The Moody Blues	-
20	Get on the Good Foot	James Brown	-
24	Doremi Fasol Latido	Hawkwind	-
27	Garden Party	Ricky Nelson	-
-	Slayed?	Slade	-
-	Boomer's Story	Ry Cooder	-
-	Can't Buy a Thrill	Steely Dan	Debut
-	Don McLean	Don McLean	-
-	Ege Bamyasi	Can	-
-	Focus 3	Focus	-
-	Romany	The Hollies	-
-	Ennismore	Colin Blunstone	-
-	For the Roses	Joni Mitchell	-
-	Free to Be... You and Me	Marlo Thomas & Friends	-
-	Good Times	Kool & the Gang	-
-	International Superstar	Johnny Cash	Compilation
-	Jesus Was a Capricorn	Kris Kristofferson	-
-	Joe Cocker	Joe Cocker	-
-	The Johnny Cash Family Christmas	Johnny Cash	Christmas
-	Killer Joe	Little Jimmy Osmond	-
-	Life Goes On	Paul Williams	-
-	The Magician's Birthday	Uriah Heep	-
-	No Secrets	Carly Simon	-
-	Not till Tomorrow	Ralph McTell	-
-	Old Dan's Records	Gordon Lightfoot	-
-	Passage	Bloodrock	-
-	The Partridge Family Notebook	The Partridge Family	-
-	Smokestack Lightning	Mike Harrison	-
-	The Supremes Produced and Arranged by Jimmy Webb	The Supremes	-
-	They Only Come Out at Night	Edgar Winter Group	-
-	Whatever's for Us	Joan Armatrading	-
-	Why Dontcha	West, Bruce and Laing	-
-	The World Is a Ghetto	War	-

=== December ===
Day	Album	Artist	Notes
1	Octopus	Gentle Giant	UK
1	Separate Ways	Elvis Presley	Compilation
4	Really	JJ Cale	-
8	Trouble Man	Marvin Gaye	Soundtrack
9	Hot August Night	Neil Diamond	Live
11	More Hot Rocks (Big Hits & Fazed Cookies)	The Rolling Stones	Compilation
15	Piledriver	Status Quo	-
22	Made in Japan	Deep Purple	Live
-	Across 110th Street	Bobby Womack and J.J. Johnson	Soundtrack
-	Azteca	Azteca	Debut
-	The Grand Wazoo	Frank Zappa	-
-	Gypsy Cowboy	New Riders of the Purple Sage	-
-	It's Not Love (But It's Not Bad)	Merle Haggard	-
-	Lady Lake	Gnidrolog	-
-	Pleasure	Ohio Players	-
-	R.E.O./T.W.O.	REO Speedwagon	-
-	The Sweet's Biggest Hits	Sweet	Compilation
-	Who's Gonna Play This Old Piano?	Jerry Lee Lewis	-

=== Release date unknown ===
- 360 Degrees of Billy Paul - Billy Paul
- Akilah! - Melvin Sparks
- All Together Now - Argent
- Alone Again (Naturally) – Andy Williams
- Already Here – Redbone
- Antithesis - Gypsy
- The Artistry of Glen Campbell – Glen Campbell
- Attica Blues – Archie Shepp
- The Award Winning Country Gentlemen - The Country Gentlemen
- Baby Won't You Change Your Mind - Black Ivory
- Back Door - Back Door
- Banco del Mutuo Soccorso – Banco del Mutuo Soccorso
- Be Altitude: Respect Yourself – The Staple Singers
- Be Good to Yourself at Least Once a Day - Man
- Bitter Sweet - The Main Ingredient
- Black Heat - Black Heat
- Blacknuss – Rahsaan Roland Kirk
- Bloodstone - Bloodstone
- Blue Moses - Randy Weston
- Bluesmith - Jimmy Smith
- The Bridge in Blue – The Brooklyn Bridge (as The Bridge)
- Bugger Off! - Stack Waddy
- Bulletproof - Hard Stuff
- Bump City - Tower of Power
- Carnival in Babylon – Amon Düül II
- Changes - Catapilla
- Cherry - Stanley Turrentine
- Cluster II – Cluster
- Coming Together - New Birth
- Cosmo - Doug Clifford
- Crossings – Herbie Hancock
- Cymande - Cymande
- Dark Round the Edges – Dark
- Demolition Derby – Sandy Bull
- Demon in Disguise – David Bromberg
- Diamonds in the Rough - John Prine
- Dig This! - Bobbi Humphrey
- Dingly Dell – Lindisfarne
- Discover America - Van Dyke Parks
- Don't It Drag On - Chris Smither
- Double Dubliners – The Dubliners
- Duane & Greg Allman - Duane and Gregg Allman
- Earthspan – Incredible String Band
- Elis – Elis Regina
- Ella Loves Cole – Ella Fitzgerald
- Emergency Ward – Nina Simone
- Ethiopian Knights - Donald Byrd
- Everything Stops for Tea - Long John Baldry
- Face to Face with the Truth - The Undisputed Truth
- Faust So Far – Faust
- Fifth - Soft Machine
- Filthy! - Papa John Creach
- First Base - Babe Ruth
- First Taste of Sin – Cold Blood
- Fly Dude - Jimmy McGriff
- Foursider - The Sérgio Mendes and Brasil '66
- Foxy Lady - Cher
- Framed – The Sensational Alex Harvey Band
- "Freakin' at the Freaker's Ball" - Shel Silverstein
- Freeway Madness - The Pretty Things
- Friendliness - Stackridge
- Garden in the City – Melanie
- The Gentle Giant - Yusef Lateef
- Geronimo's Cadillac - Michael Martin Murphey
- Goin' Down Slow - Sonny Stitt
- Guess Who – B. B. King
- Hard Attack - Dust
- Heads – Osibisa
- The Heatin' System - Jimmy McGriff
- Help Me Make It Through the Night - Hank Crawford
- Hogwash – The Groundhogs
- Home - Home
- Home Free – Dan Fogelberg
- Home Is Where the Music Is - Hugh Masekela
- Hometown! – The Dubliners (live)
- Honky-Tonk Stardust Cowboy - Jonathan Edwards
- Hot Licks, Cold Steel & Truckers Favorites - Commander Cody and His Lost Planet Airmen
- Howard Tate - Howard Tate
- Hush 'N' Thunder - Yusef Lateef
- I Am – Pete Townshend
- I Am Woman - Helen Reddy
- I Love the Way You Love - Betty Wright
- I'll Play the Blues for You - Albert King
- If 4 (a.k.a. Waterfall) – If
- I'll Make You Music – Beverly Bremers
- Imagination Lady – Chicken Shack
- In Search of Amelia Earhart - Plainsong
- ...In Spite of Harry's Toenail - Gnidrolog
- Instant Death - Eddie Harris
- Intensity - Charles Earland
- It Never Rains in Southern California – Albert Hammond
- It's Just Begun - Jimmy Castor
- Jackie - Jackie DeShannon
- Jerry Jeff Walker - Jerry Jeff Walker
- Jermaine - Jermaine Jackson
- Jo Jo Gunne – Jo Jo Gunne
- John David Souther - JD Souther
- Kapt. Kopter and the (Fabulous) Twirly Birds – Randy California
- Keeper of the Castle – Four Tops
- La Población – Víctor Jara
- Lark - Linda Lewis
- Last Autumn's Dream – Jade Warrior
- Let's Make Up and Be Friendly – Bonzo Dog Doo-Dah Band
- Let My Children Hear Music – Charles Mingus
- Letters - Jimmy Webb
- Live – Donny Hathaway – Live
- Live in Tokyo – Weather Report – Live
- The London Muddy Waters Sessions – Muddy Waters
- Love Unlimited - Love Unlimited
- Mark, Don & Mel: 1969–71 – Grand Funk Railroad – Compilation
- Marlena (Marlena Shaw album) - Marlena Shaw
- Mandrill Is – Mandrill
- Maxoom - Mahogany Rush
- Me & Chet - Chet Atkins and Jerry Reed
- Mediterranean Tales - Triumvirat
- A Meeting of the Times – Rahsaan Roland Kirk
- A Message from the People – Ray Charles
- Millie Jackson - Millie Jackson
- Mississippi Gambler – Herbie Mann
- Mournin' – Night Sun
- Morning Bugle - John Hartford
- Morning Star - Hubert Laws
- Move Along - The Grass Roots
- Myrrh - Robin Williamson
- Neu! – Neu!
- Never Get Out of These Blues Alive – John Lee Hooker
- Next Album - Sonny Rollins
- O'Keefe - Danny O'Keefe
- Of Rivers and Religion - John Fahey
- Offering - Larry Coryell
- Olympia 71 – Dalida – Live
- Orange - Al Stewart
- The Osmonds Live – The Osmonds – Live
- Painted Head – Tim Hardin
- Piano Improvisations Vol. 2 – Chick Corea
- Portrait of Donny – Donny Osmond
- Pancho and Lefty – Merle Haggard and Willie Nelson
- Prologue – Renaissance
- Prosperous – Christy Moore
- Raw Velvet - Bobby Whitlock
- Recycling The Blues & Other Related Stuff - Taj Mahal
- Red Sea - Warhorse
- Return to Forever – Return to Forever
- Reunion Blues – Oscar Peterson and Milt Jackson
- Road - Road
- The Road Is No Place for a Lady - Cass Elliot
- Rock Me Baby – David Cassidy
- Roforofo Fight - Fela Kuti
- Sahara - McCoy Tyner
- Science Fiction - Ornette Coleman
- Scraps – NRBQ
- Screaming Target – Big Youth
- Seven Bridges Road - Steve Young
- Seventy-Second Brave - Keef Hartley
- Shades of Green – Grant Green
- Shakara – Fela Kuti
- Shearwater - Martin Carthy
- Sloppy Seconds – Dr. Hook and the Medicine Show
- Sonic Seasonings - Wendy Carlos
- Sort Of – Slapp Happy
- Soul Is... Pretty Purdie - Bernard Purdie
- Speech - Steamhammer
- Spring - American Spring
- Stardancer - Tom Rapp
- Stoneground Words – Melanie
- Stratavarious - Ginger Baker
- Suite for Late Summer – Dion DiMucci
- Sunday Morning Coming Down – Johnny Cash
- The Sweet Life - Reuben Wilson
- Sweet Revival - Ronnie Foster
- The Sylvers - The Sylvers
- A Tab in the Ocean – Nektar
- Talk to the People - Les McCann
- Te John, Grease, & Wolfman - Charlie Daniels
- Tell Me This Is a Dream - The Delfonics
- Texas Cannonball - Freddie King
- Think (About It) - Lyn Collins
- Tibetan Bells – Henry Wolff and Nancy Hennings
- Too Young – Donny Osmond
- The Train I'm On - Tony Joe White
- Understanding - Bobby Womack
- Uomo di pezza – Le Orme
- Vindicator - Arthur Lee
- The Voice of the Eagle - Robbie Basho
- Walking the Blues - Otis Spann
- Warpig – Warpig
- We Got a Good Thing Going - Hank Crawford
- We the People - The Soul Searchers
- What a Bunch of Sweeties - Pink Fairies
- Whatcha See Is Whatcha Get – The Dramatics
- Who Will Save the World? – The Groundhogs
- Where It All Began – Bo Diddley
- ...Where the Groupies Killed the Blues - Lucifer's Friend
- White Rabbit - George Benson
- Whole Oats - Hall & Oates
- Wild Flower - Hubert Laws
- Wild Horses Rock Steady - Johnny "Hammond" Smith
- Wild One – The Guess Who
- Will the Circle Be Unbroken – Nitty Gritty Dirt Band
- The Willie Way - Willie Nelson
- Wolf City – Amon Düül II
- World Galaxy – Alice Coltrane
- You Want It, You Got It – The Detroit Emeralds

== Biggest hit singles ==
The following songs achieved the highest chart positions in the charts of 1972.

#	Artist	Title	Year	Country	Chart Entries
1	Don McLean	"American Pie"	1972	(United States)	US Billboard 1 for 19 weeks, Canada RPM 1 for 5 weeks, New Zealand 1 for 3 weeks, Australia 1 for 5 weeks, UK 2 for 16 weeks
2	Harry Nilsson	"Without You"	1972	(United States)	UK 1 for 20 weeks, Australia 1 for 5 weeks, US Billboard 1 for 19 weeks, New Zealand 1 for 2 weeks
3	Hot Butter	"Popcorn"	1972	(United States)	Holland 1 for 15 weeks, France 1 for 5 weeks, Switzerland 1 for 17 weeks, Norway 1 for 20 weeks, Germany 1 for 5 months, UK 5 for 19 weeks, US Billboard 9 for 18 weeks
4	Neil Young	"Heart of Gold"	1972	(Canada)	US Billboard 1 for 14 weeks, Canada 1 for 12 weeks, France 2 for 8 weeks, Norway 4 for 11 weeks, Germany 4 for 4 months,
5	The Moody Blues	"Nights in White Satin"	1972	(United States)	US Billboard 2 for 18 weeks, Canada 2 for 12 weeks, France 1 for 9 weeks, Holland 2 for 14 weeks,

== Top 40 Chart hit singles ==
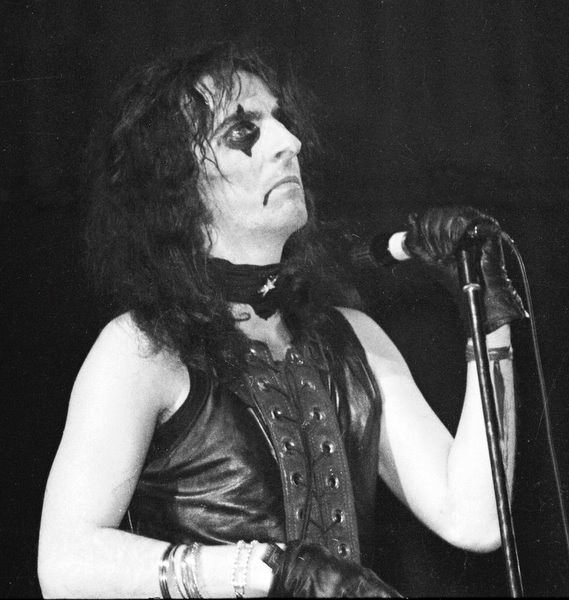
Alice Cooper in 1972

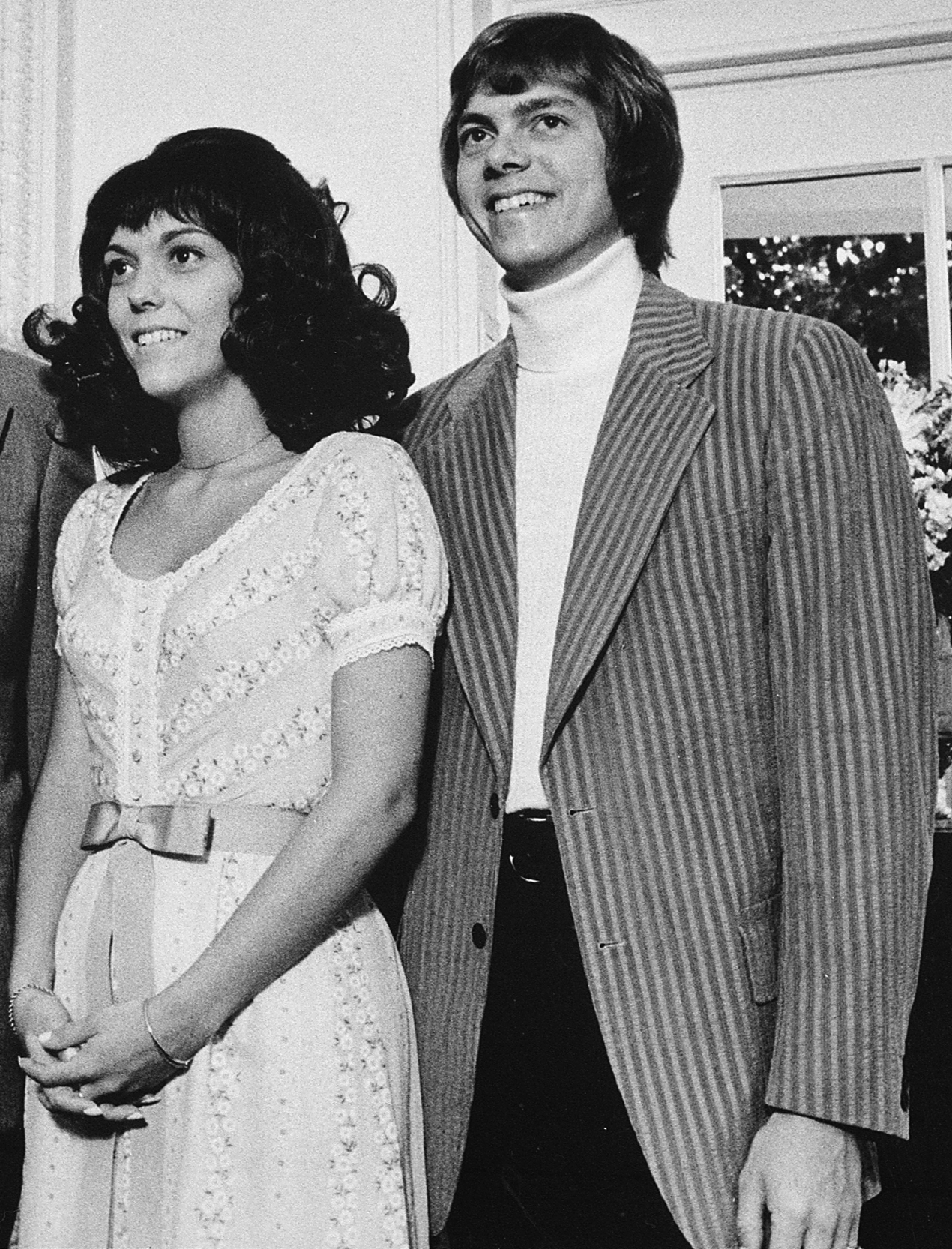
The Carpenters in 1972

Song title	Artist(s)	Release date(s)	US	UK	Highest chart position	Other Chart Performance(s)
"10538 Overture"	Electric Light Orchestra	June 1972	n/a	9	9 (United Kingdom)	24 (Netherlands [Dutch Top 40])
"A Cowboy's Work Is Never Done"	Sonny & Cher	February 1972	8	n/a	3 (Canada)	See chart entry performance
"A Horse with No Name"	America	January 1972	1	3	1 (Canada, Finland, United States)	See chart performance entry
"Ain't Understanding Mellow"	Jerry Butler and Brenda Lee Eager	January 1970	21	n/a	21 (United States)	3 (U.S. Billboard Best Selling Soul Singles)
"All the Young Dudes"	Mott the Hoople	July 1972	37	3	3 (United Kingdom)	4 (Ireland) - 13 (New Zealand) - 31 (Canada) - 32 (U.S. Record World) - 34 (U.S. Cash Box Top 100)
"Alone Again (Naturally)"	Gilbert O'Sullivan	February 1972	1	3	1 (Canada, France, United States)	See chart performance entry
"Amazing Grace"	Pipes and Drums and Military Band of the Royal Scots Dragoon Guards	April 1972	n/a	1	1 (Australia, Canada, Ireland, South Africa, United Kingdom)	n/a
"America"	Simon & Garfunkel	July 1972	97	25	25 (United Kingdom)	n/a
"American Pie"	Don McLean	January 1972	1	2	1 (Australia, Canada, New Zealand)	See chart performance entry [1971 single release overlapped into 1972]
"Anticipation"	Carly Simon	January 1972	13	n/a	9 (Canada)	3 (U.S. Billboard Adult Contemporary) - 10 (U.S. Cash Box Top 100) - 64 (Australia)
"Baby Blue"	Badfinger	March 1972	14	n/a	3 (Malaysia)	7 (Canada) - 9 (New Zealand, U.S. Cash Box Top 100) - 12 (U.S. Record World Top 100) - 14 (Sweden) - 16 (Australia) - 18 (South Africa) - 30 (West Germany)

=== Other Chart hit singles ===
- "Apache" – The Shadows (reissue)
- "Baby, Don't Get Hooked on Me" – Mac Davis
- "Baby Let Me Take You (In My Arms)" – The Detroit Emeralds
- "Back Off Boogaloo" – Ringo Starr
- "Back Stabbers" – The O'Jays
- "Bang a Gong (Get It On)" – T. Rex
- "Beautiful Sunday" – Daniel Boone
- "Been to Canaan" – Carole King
- "Beg, Steal or Borrow" – The New Seekers
- "Ben" – Michael Jackson
- "Best Thing" – Styx
- "Betcha by Golly, Wow" – The Stylistics
- "Black and White" – Three Dog Night
- "Black Dog"- Led Zeppelin
- "Block Buster!"- Sweet
- "A Brand New Song" – Cliff Richard
- "Brand New Key" – Melanie
- "Brandy (You're a Fine Girl)" – Looking Glass
- "Burning Love" – Elvis Presley
- "California Man" – The Move
- "The Candy Man" – Sammy Davis Jr.
- "Can't You Hear the Song?" – Wayne Newton
- "Children of the Revolution" – T.Rex
- "Circles" – The New Seekers
- "The Cisco Kid" – War
- "City of New Orleans" – Arlo Guthrie
- "Clair" – Gilbert O'Sullivan
- "Clean Up Woman" – Betty Wright
- "Coconut" – Harry Nilsson
- "Changes" – David Bowie
- "Come What May (Après Toi)" – Vicky Leandros
- "Conquistador" – Procol Harum
- "Cotton Jenny" – Anne Murray
- "The Cover of the Rolling Stone" – Dr. Hook & The Medicine Show
- "Crazy Horses" – The Osmonds
- "Crocodile Rock" – Elton John
- "Daddy Don't You Walk So Fast" – Wayne Newton
- "Danny's Song" – Anne Murray
- "Day After Day" – Badfinger
- "Day by Day" – Godspell
- "The Day I Found Myself" – Honey Cone
- "Day Dreaming" – Aretha Franklin
- "Diary" – Bread
- "Do It Again" – Steely Dan
- "Doctor My Eyes" – Jackson Browne
- "Don't Let Me Be Lonely Tonight" – James Taylor
- "Don't Say You Don't Remember" – Beverly Bremers
- "Drowning in the Sea of Love" – Joe Simon
- "Down by the Lazy River" – The Osmonds
- "Easy Livin'" – Uriah Heep
- "Elected" – Alice Cooper
- "Everybody Plays the Fool" – The Main Ingredient
- "Ev'ry Day of My Life" – Bobby Vinton
- "Everything I Own" – Bread
- "Eye Level" – Simon Park Orchestra
- "Family Affair" – Sly & the Family Stone
- "The Family of Man" – Three Dog Night
- "Feel the Need in Me" – The Detroit Emeralds
- "The First Time Ever I Saw Your Face" – Roberta Flack
- "Floy Joy" – Supremes
- "Footstompin' Music" – Grand Funk Railroad
- "Forever Autumn" – Vigrass and Osborne
- "Freddie's Dead (Theme From Superfly)" – Curtis Mayfield
- "Garden Party" – Rick Nelson
- "Geronimo's Cadillac" – Michael Martin Murphey
- "Get on the Good Foot pt.1" – James Brown
- "Getting a Drag" – Lynsey de Paul
- "Give Ireland Back to the Irish" – Wings
- "Go All the Way" – Raspberries
- "Good Time Charlie's Got the Blues" – Danny O'Keefe
- "Goodbye to Love" – The Carpenters
- "Got to Be There" – Michael Jackson
- "Gudbuy T'Jane" – Slade
- "The Guitar Man" – Bread
- "The Happiest Girl in the Whole USA" – Donna Fargo
- "Happy" – The Rolling Stones
- "Happy the Man" – Genesis
- "Happy Xmas (War Is Over)" – John Lennon & Yoko Ono, the Plastic Ono Band with the Harlem Community Choir
- "He Is Your Brother" – ABBA
- "Heart of Gold" – Neil Young
- "Hi, Hi, Hi"/"C Moon" – Wings
- "Highway Star" – Deep Purple
- "Hold Her Tight" – The Osmonds
- "Hold Your Head Up" – Argent
- "Honky Cat" – Elton John
- "Hot Rod Lincoln" – Commander Cody and His Lost Planet Airmen
- "How Do You Do" – Mouth & MacNeal
- "Hurting Each Other" – The Carpenters
- "I Am Woman" – Helen Reddy
- "I Believe in Music" – Gallery
- "I Can See Clearly Now" – Johnny Nash
- "I Get the Sweetest Feeling" – Jackie Wilson
- "I Gotcha" – Joe Tex
- "I Need You" – America
- "I Saw The Light" – Todd Rundgren
- "I Wanna Be Where You Are" – Michael Jackson
- "I Wanna Be With You" – Raspberries
- "I'd Like to Teach the World to Sing" – The New Seekers
- "I'd Love You to Want Me" – Lobo
- "I'll Be Around" – The Spinners
- "I'll Take You There" – The Staple Singers
- "I'm Still in Love with You" – Al Green
- "I'm Stone in Love with You" – The Stylistics
- "I've Been Lonely for So Long" – Frederick Knight
- "(If Loving You Is Wrong) I Don't Want To Be Right" – Luther Ingram
- "If You Don't Know Me by Now" – Harold Melvin & the Blue Notes
- "I'll Make You Music" – Beverly Bremers
- "Immigration Man" – Crosby & Nash
- "In the Rain" – The Dramatics
- "Isn't Life Strange" – The Moody Blues
- "It Never Rains in Southern California" – Albert Hammond
- "It's Going to Take Some Time" – The Carpenters
- "Jesus" – Cliff Richard
- "Jesus Is Just Alright" – The Doobie Brothers
- "John, I'm Only Dancing" – David Bowie
- "Join Together" – The Who
- "Joy" – Apollo 100
- "Jump into the Fire" – Harry Nilsson
- "Jungle Fever" – The Chakachas
- "(Last Night) I Didn't Get to Sleep at All" – The 5th Dimension
- "Layla" – Derek and the Dominos
- "Lean on Me" – Bill Withers
- "Legend in Your Own Time" – Carly Simon
- "Let's Stay Together" – Al Green
- "The Lion Sleeps Tonight" – Robert John
- "Listen to the Music" – The Doobie Brothers
- "Living in Harmony" – Cliff Richard
- "Long Cool Woman (In a Black Dress)" – The Hollies
- "Look What You Done for Me" – Al Green
- "Looking Through the Eyes of Love" – The Partridge Family
- "Loop di Love" – Shag [Jonathan King under a pseudonym]
- "Speak Softly Love (Love Theme from The Godfather)" – Andy Williams
- "Mama Weer All Crazee Now" – Slade
- "Mary Had a Little Lamb" – Wings
- "Me and Julio Down by the Schoolyard" – Paul Simon
- "Me and Mrs. Jones" – Billy Paul
- "Metal Guru" – T.Rex
- "Mother and Child Reunion" – Paul Simon
- "Motorcycle Mama" – Sailcat
- "Mouldy Old Dough" – Lieutenant Pigeon
- "My Ding-a-Ling" – Chuck Berry
- "Never Been to Spain" – Three Dog Night
- "Nice to Be With You" – Gallery
- "Nights in White Satin" – The Moody Blues
- "No One to Depend On" – Santana
- "Oh Girl" – The Chi-Lites
- "Old Man" – Neil Young
- "On the Ride (You Do It Once, You Do It Twice) - Continental Uptight Band
- "One Monkey Don't Stop No Show" – Honey Cone
- "Operator" – Jim Croce
- "Outa-Space" – Billy Preston
- "Papa Was a Rollin' Stone" – The Temptations
- "Paper Plane" – Status Quo
- "People Need Love" – ABBA
- "Pieces of April" – Three Dog Night
- "Precious and Few" – Climax
- "Puppy Love" – Donny Osmond
- "Reelin' In the Years" – Steely Dan
- "Respect Yourself" – The Staple Singers
- "Roadrunner"- Jonathan Richman
- "Rock and Roll Part 1 + 2" – Gary Glitter
- "Rock Me Baby" – Sacha Distel (dubbed)
- "Rocket Man" – Elton John
- "Rockin' Pneumonia and the Boogie Woogie Flu" – Johnny Rivers
- "Rockin' Robin" – Michael Jackson
- "Rock & Roll Soul" – Grand Funk Railroad
- "Rolling Stone" - Suzi Quatro
- "Roundabout" – Yes
- "Run Run Run" – Jo Jo Gunne
- "Run to Me" – Bee Gees
- "Saturday in the Park" – Chicago
- "School's Out" – Alice Cooper
- "Scorpio" – Dennis Coffey & The Detroit Guitar Band
- "Sealed With A Kiss" – Bobby Vinton
- "Seaside Shuffle" – Terry Dactyl and the Dinosaurs
- "She is Just Kind of a Girl" – Byorn&Benny
- "Signs" – The Drifters
- "Silver Machine" – Hawkwind
- "Simone" – England Dan & John Ford Coley
- "Slippin' into Darkness" – War
- "Small Beginnings" – Flash
- "Solid Gold Easy Action" – T.Rex
- "Someday Never Comes" – Creedence Clearwater Revival
- "Something's Wrong with Me" – Austin Roberts
- "Song Sung Blue" – Neil Diamond
- "Spaceman" – Harry Nilsson
- "Speak to the Sky" – Rick Springfield
- "Starman" – David Bowie
- "Starting All Over Again" – Mel & Tim
- "Stay with Me" – Faces
- "Storm in a Teacup" – The Fortunes
- "Suavecito" – Malo
- "Sugar Daddy" – The Jackson 5
- "Sugar Me" – Lynsey de Paul
- "Summer Breeze" – Seals and Crofts
- "Sunshine" – Jonathan Edwards
- "Superstition" – Stevie Wonder
- "Sweet Seasons" – Carole King
- "Sweet Surrender" – Bread
- "Sylvia's Mother" – Dr. Hook & The Medicine Show
- "Take It Easy" – Eagles
- "Take Me Bak 'Ome" – Slade
- "Taxi" – Harry Chapin
- "Telegram Sam" – T.Rex
- "That's When the Music Takes Me – Neil Sedaka
- "Thunder and Lightning" – Chi Coltrane
- "Tight Rope" – Leon Russell
- "Tiny Dancer" – Elton John
- "Together Let's Find Love" – The 5th Dimension
- "Too Late to Turn Back Now" – Cornelius Brothers & Sister Rose
- "Top of the World" – The Carpenters (in Japan; it became a hit in the U.S. and the UK the following year)
- "Traveling in the Dark" – Mountain
- "The Jean Genie" – David Bowie
- "Troglodyte (Cave Man)" – Jimmy Castor Bunch
- "Trouble Man" – Marvin Gaye
- "Tumbling Dice" – The Rolling Stones
- "Two Divided by Love" – The Grass Roots
- "Use Me" – Bill Withers
- "Ventura Highway" – America
- "Vincent" – Don McLean
- "Virginia Plain" – Roxy Music
- "Walkin' in the Rain with the One I Love" – Love Unlimited
- "The Way of Love" – Cher
- "We Can Make it Together" – Steve and Eydie featuring The Osmonds
- "We're Free" – Beverly Bremers
- "When You've Gotta Go - Solomon King
- "Where Is the Love?" – Roberta Flack & Donny Hathaway
- "Without You" – Harry Nilsson
- "Witchy Woman" – Eagles
- "Woman Is the Nigger of the World" – John Lennon
- "You Are Everything" – The Stylistics
- "You Don't Mess Around with Jim" – Jim Croce
- "You Ought to be With Me" – Al Green
- "You Turn Me On I'm a Radio" – Joni Mitchell
- "You Want It, You Got It" – The Detroit Emeralds
- "You Wear It Well" – Rod Stewart
- "You're So Vain" – Carly Simon
- "Your Mama Don't Dance" – Loggins and Messina

== Notable singles ==
Song title	Artist(s)	Release date(s)	Other Chart Performance(s)
"Starman"	David Bowie	April 1972	See chart performance entry

=== Other Notable singles ===
- "Hoochie Koochie Lady" b/w "First Avenue" - Elf
- "When You Say Love" - Sonny & Cher

== Published popular music ==
- "Alone Again (Naturally)" w.m. Raymond O'Sullivan
- "Alone at a Drive-In Movie" w.m. Jim Jacobs & Warren Casey
- "American Pie" w.m. Don McLean
- "Bad, Bad Leroy Brown" w.m. Jim Croce
- "Beautiful Through and Through" w. Bob Merrill m. Jule Styne from the musical Sugar
- "Beauty School Dropout" w.m. Warren Casey & Jim Jacobs from the musical Grease
- "The Beauty That Drives Men Mad" w. Bob Merrill m. Jule Styne from the musical Sugar
- "Bein' Green" w.m. Joe Raposo from the television series Sesame Street.
- "Blues for Newport" m. Dave Brubeck
- "Born to Hand Jive" w.m. Warren Casey & Jim Jacobs from the musical Grease
- "Burning Love" w.m. Dennis Linde
- "C is for Cookie" w.m. Joe Raposo
- "Clair" w.m. Raymond O'Sullivan
- "Come Dream With Me" w. Sammy Cahn m. Jimmy Van Heusen
- "Corner of the Sky" w.m. Stephen Schwartz from the musical Pippin
- "For Emily, Whenever I May Find Her" – Simon & Garfunkel
- "Greased Lightning" w.m. Warren Casey & Jim Jacobs from the musical Grease
- "I Can See Clearly Now" w.m. Johnny Nash
- "Killing Me Softly with His Song" w. Norman Gimbel m. Charles Fox
- "Liza with a Z" w. Fred Ebb m. John Kander from the television production Liza with a Z
- "Magic To Do" w.m. Stephen Schwartz. Introduced by Ben Vereen in the musical Pippin
- "Maybe This Time" w. Fred Ebb m. John Kander from the musical film Cabaret
- "Mooning" w.m. Warren Casey & Jim Jacobs from the musical Grease
- "The Morning After" w.m. Joel Hirschhorn & Al Kasha from the film The Poseidon Adventure
- "No Time at All" w.m. Stephen Schwartz from the musical Pippin
- "The Old Fashioned Way" w. Charles Aznavour, Joel Hirschhorn & Al Kasha m. George Garvarentz
- "Ring Them Bells" w. Fred Ebb m. John Kander from the television production Liza with a Z
- "Rock and Roll" – Led Zeppelin
- "Shakin' at the High School Hop" w.m. Jim Jacobs & Warren Casey
- "Sing" w.m. Joe Raposo. Introduced by Bob McGrath on Sesame Street
- "Speak Softly, Love" w. Larry Kusik m. Nino Rota from the film The Godfather
- "Summer Nights" w.m. Warren Casey & Jim Jacobs from the musical Grease
- "Taxi (song)" — Harry Chapin
- "There Are Worse Things I Could Do" w.m. Warren Casey & Jim Jacobs from the musical Grease
- "Tie a Yellow Ribbon Round the Ole Oak Tree" w.m. L. Russell Brown & Irwin Levine
- "Vincent" w.m. Don McLean
- "You Are the Sunshine of My Life" w.m. Stevie Wonder

== Other notable songs (world) ==
- "Caro Mozart" – Sylvie Vartan (France)
- "Holidays" – Michel Polnareff (France)

== Classical music ==
- Arthur Bliss – Metamorphic Variations
- Friedrich Cerha – Spiegel
- George Crumb – Makrokosmos, Volume I for amplified piano
- Mario Davidovsky – Transientes for orchestra
- Paul Le Flem – Symphony No. 4
- Karel Goeyvaerts
  - Bélise dans un jardin
  - Nachklänge aus dem Theater I–II, for tape
  - Piano Quartet
- Hans Werner Henze – Heliogabalus imperator
- Klaus Huber
  - ...Ausgespannt..., sacred music for baritone, five instrumental groups, loudspeakers, two two-track tapes, and organ
  - Ein Hauch von Unzeit I: Plainte sur la perte de la réflexion musicale – quelques madrigaux pour flûte seule ou flûte avec quelques instruments quelquonques...
  - Ein Hauch von Unzeit II: Plainte sur la perte de la réflexion musicale pour piano à une main et demie... , for piano
  - Ein Hauch von Unzeit III, for 2–7 players (variable instrumentation)
- Dmitri Kabalevsky – A Letter to the 30th Century (oratorio)
- Wojciech Kilar – Prelude and Carol for 4 oboes and strings
- György Ligeti – Double Concerto for flute, oboe and orchestra
- Theo Loevendie – Horn Concerto, "Orbits"
- Yves Prin – Actions-Simultanées II, for orchestra
- Einojuhani Rautavaara
  - Cantus Arcticus, for orchestra
  - Canto III – A Portrait of the Artist at a Certain Moment, for string orchestra
  - Credo, for mixed chorus
  - Book of Life (Elämän kirja), choral suite
- Steve Reich – Clapping Music
- George Rochberg – Recordanza (Soliloquy for Cello and Piano)
- Peter Ruzicka – Bewegung
- Karlheinz Stockhausen –
  - Alphabet für Liège, for soloists and duos, Nr. 36
  - Ylem, for variable ensemble of 19 or more players, Nr. 37
- Toru Takemitsu – Distance
- Veljo Tormis – Curse Upon Iron (Raua needmine)

== Opera ==
- Peter Maxwell Davies – Taverner (12 July, Covent Garden, London)
- Kiyoshige Koyama – Sansho Dayu
- Per Nørgård – Gilgamesh
- Thomas Pasatieri
  - Black Widow
  - The Trial of Mary Lincoln
- Charles Wilson – Héloise and Abelard

== Musical theater ==
- Berlin to Broadway with Kurt Weill – Off-Broadway revue opened at the Theatre de Lys on October 1 and ran for 152 performances
- Company (Stephen Sondheim) – London production opened at Her Majesty's Theatre on January 18 and ran for 344 performances
- Cowardy Custard – London production opened at the Mermaid Theatre on July 10 and ran for 405 performances
- Don't Bother Me, I Can't Cope – London production opened at the Playhouse Theatre on April 19 and ran for 914 performances
- Don't Play Us Cheap – Broadway production opened at the Ethel Barrymore Theatre on May 16 and ran for 164 performances
- A Funny Thing Happened on the Way to the Forum (Stephen Sondheim) – Broadway revival
- The Good Old, Bad Old Days (Music, Lyrics & Book: Anthony Newley & Leslie Bricusse) London production opened at the Prince of Wales Theatre on December 20 and ran for 309 performances
- Jesus Christ Superstar (Andrew Lloyd Webber and Tim Rice) – London production opened at the Palace Theatre on August 9 and ran for 3358 performances
- Grease – Broadway production ran for 3388 performances, the longest run ever at that time
- Joseph and the Amazing Technicolor Dreamcoat (Lloyd Webber & Rice) – London production opened at The Roundhouse on November 8 and ran for 43 performances
- Man of La Mancha Broadway revival
- Pippin – Broadway production opened at the Imperial Theatre on October 23 and ran for 1944 performances
- Sugar – Broadway production opened at the Kajestic Theatre and ran for 505 performances

== Musical films ==
- Baharo Phool Barsao
- Cabaret
- Fillmore (musical documentary)
- Jawani Diwani
- Lady Sings the Blues
- Man of La Mancha
- Propala Hramota
- Elvis on Tour starring Elvis Presley
- Journey Back to Oz, with music by Walter Scharf, and songs by Jimmy Van Heusen and Sammy Cahn
- Seeta Aur Geeta (music by R. D. Burman)

== Musical television productions ==
- Liza with a Z

== Births ==
- January 1
  - Yoon Chan, South Korean actor
  - Imaani, Jamaican-English singer
- January 3 – Nichole Nordeman, American singer
- January 5
  - Jang Seo-hee, South Korean actress
  - Sakis Rouvas, Greek singer, actor and businessman
- January 15
  - Chung Il-mi, South Korean goffer
  - Yang Yong-eun, South Korean goffer
- January 17 – Aqualung, English songwriter, musician and record producer
- January 19 – Angham, Egyptian singer, record producer and actress
- January 20 – So Chan-whee, South Korean singer
- January 21
  - Cat Power, American singer-songwriter and musician
  - Jesse van Ruller, Dutch jazz guitarist and composer
- January 24 - Beth Hart, American singer, songwriter and musician
- January 25 – Kim Jong-nam, South Korean rapper and dancer (Turbo)
- January 26 – Christopher Boykin, American rapper
- January 27
  - Wynne Evans, Welsh tenor
  - Mark Owen, British singer (Take That)
- January 28 – Monifah, American R&B singer
  - Bibi Gaytán, Mexican singer
- January 29 – Coumba Gawlo, Senegalese singer
- February 1 – Tego Calderón, Puerto Rican rapper and singer
- February 2 - Zoë Keating, Canadian-American cellist and composer
- February 10 – Mr. Scruff, English record producer and DJ
- February 11 – Craig Jones, American heavy metal sampler/keyboardist (Slipknot)
- February 14 – Rob Thomas, American singer-songwriter, musician, multi instrumentalist and advocate (Matchbox Twenty)
- February 15 – Michelle, German singer
- February 16 – Taylor Hawkins, American rock drummer (Foo Fighters) (d. 2022)
- February 17
  - Billie Joe Armstrong, American rock musician, playwright, activist, advocate, actor and singer-songwriter (Green Day)
- February 18
  - Jennifer Brown, Swedish singer
  - Yuki Isoya, Japanese singer
- February 20
  - K-os, Canadian alternative rapper, singer-songwriter and record producer
  - Neil Primrose, Scottish drummer (Travis)
- February 21 – Seo Taiji, South Korean singer (Seo Taiji and Boys)
- February 24
  - Teodor Currentzis, Greek orchestral conductor
- March 4
  - Alison Wheeler, British singer (The Beautiful South)
  - Ivy Queen, Puerto Rican singer, rapper and songwriter
- March 5 – Adam Zindani (Stereophonics)
- March 6
  - Jaret Reddick, American musician (Bowling for Soup)
  - Shaquille O'Neal, American basketball player and rapper
- March 7 – Jang Dong-gun, South Korean actor
- March 8
  - Angie Hart, Australian pop singer
  - Jakob Sveistrup, Danish singer
- March 9 – AZ, American rapper
- March 10 – Timbaland, American record producer, rapper, singer-songwriter and DJ (Ginuwine, Aaliyah, Justin Timberlake)
- March 11 – UA, Japanese singer-songwriter
- March 13 – Common, American rapper and actor
- March 15 – Mark Hoppus, American rock musician (blink-182)
- March 16 – Andy Dunlop, Scottish musician (Travis)
- March 17 – Melissa Auf der Maur (Hole)
- March 20
  - Alex Kapranos, British rock singer and guitarist (Franz Ferdinand)
  - Shelly Poole, English singer (Alisha's Attic)
- March 21 – Large Professor, American rapper and music producer
- March 29 – Hera Björk, Icelandic singer
- April 1 – Sukshinder Shinda, British bhangra singer-songwriter and record producer
- April 4
  - Vladimir Jurowski, Russian conductor
  - Jill Scott, American soul singer and songwriter
  - Magnus Sveningsson, Swedish bassist (The Cardigans)
- April 5 – Pat Green, American country singer-songwriter
- April 8 – Paul Gray, American heavy metal bass guitarist (Slipknot)
- April 10 – Sami Yli-Sirniö, Finnish rock and metal guitarist
- April 12 – Şebnem Ferah, Turkish singer-songwriter
- April 13 – Aaron Lewis, American nu metal musician (Staind)
- April 15 – Aleksey Potekhin, Russian pop DJ (Ruki Vverh!)
- April 18 – Kim Sung-jae, South Korean singer, rapper, dancer and model (Deux) (d. 1995)
- April 20
  - Željko Joksimović, Serbian singer, composer songwriter, multi-instrumentalist and producer
  - Marko Kon, Serbian composer, producer and singer
  - Stephen Marley, Jamaican-American musician
- April 21 – Severina (singer), Croatian singer
- April 23 – Amira Medunjanin, singer from Bosnia and Herzegovina
- April 24 – Corey Cerovsek, Canadian violinist and pianist
- April 27 – Rob Coombes, English musician and composer (Supergrass)
- April 28 – Violent J, American rapper
- April 29 – Fredrik Kempe, Swedish songwriter and opera and pop singer
- May 3 – Mark Morrison, British R&B singer
- May 4
  - Mike Dirnt American musician, songwriter and composer. (Green Day)
  - Chris Tomlin, American contemporary Christian musician (CCM)
- May 7 – Felix da Housecat, American house music DJ and record producer
- May 8
  - Dino Bardot, British guitarist (Franz Ferdinand, The Yummy Fur)
  - Darren Hayes, Australian singer (Savage Garden)
- May 14 – Salaam Remi, American record producer
- May 16 – Hideki Naganuma, Japanese DJ and video game composer
- May 16 – Special Ed, American rapper
- May 19
  - Jenny Berggren, Swedish singer (Ace of Base)
  - Rohan Marley, Jamaican businessman and footballer
- May 20
  - Busta Rhymes, American hip hop recording artist, actor, record producer and record executive
  - Andreas Lundstedt, Swedish singer (Alcazar)
- May 21
  - The Notorious B.I.G., American rapper (d. 1997)
  - Mitch Allan, American record producer, songwriter and musician.
- May 22 – Alison Eastwood, American actress
- May 26
  - Ahmad Dhani, Indonesian rock musician, songwriter, arranger, producer and politician
  - Alan White, English drummer (Oasis)
- May 27 – Ivete Sangalo, Brazilian female singer
- May 29 – Stanislas, French singer
- May 31
  - Denise Lopez, Swedish singer, rapper, and DJ
  - Christian McBride, American jazz bassist, composer, artistic director
- June 4
  - Stoja, Serbian pop-folk singer
  - Nikka Costa, American singer-songwriter
- June 5
  - Paweł Kotla, Polish conductor
  - Toni Pearen, Australian singer-songwriter, TV host, dancer and actor
- June 6 – Cristina Scabbia, Italian singer
- June 8 – Alice Martineau, English pop singer and songwriter (d. 2003)
- June 12 – Bounty Killer, reggae/dancehall singer
- June 13 – Natalie MacMaster, Canadian fiddler
- June 15 – Carl Thomas, American R&B singer
- June 16 – John Cho, South Korean actor
- June 17 – Rik Rok, Jamaican singer
- June 23 – Fredwreck, Palestinian American music artist and record producer
- June 25 – Mike Kroeger, Canadian rock bass guitarist (Nickelback)
- June 26 – Garou, French Canadian singer
- June 29 – DJ Shadow, American DJ and record producer
- July 1
  - Sunshine Becker, American backing singer (Furthur)
  - Alex Machacek, Austrian guitarist (BPM and CAB)
- July 4
  - Rogue, American dark wave lead singer (The Crüxshadows)
  - William Goldsmith (Sunny Day Real Estate, Foo Fighters)
- July 6 – D-Styles, American record producer and DJ
- July 9 – Simon Tong, English guitarist and keyboardist
- July 10 – Tilo Wolff, German musician
- July 12 – Brett Reed, drummer (Rancid)
- July 14 – Ill Bill, American rapper (La Coka Nostra)
- July 15 – John Dolmayan, Armenian-American drummer (System of a Down)
- July 17
  - Elizabeth Cook, American singer and guitarist
  - Jason Rullo, American drummer (Symphony X and Redemption)
- July 20
  - Vitamin C, American singer-songwriter, dancer and actress (Eve's Plum)
  - Jenny B, Italian singer
- July 26 – Wayne Wonder, reggae singer
- July 28 – Yum Jung-ah, South Korean actress
- July 29 – Simon Jones, English bassist (The Verve)
- July 29 – Anssi Kela, Finnish rock musician
- August 2 – Justyna Steczkowska, Polish singer and songwriter
- August 4 - John Paul White, is an American singer-songwriter, and was a member of the Grammy Award-winning duo The Civil Wars.
- August 6 – Geri Halliwell, British singer, clothes designer, author and actress (Spice Girls)
- August 8 – Lüpüs Thünder (Bloodhound Gang)
- August 9 – A-mei, Taiwanese Puyuma singer-songwriter
- August 10 – Devon Allman, American guitarist, singer, songwriter and record producer (The Allman Betts Band)
- August 12
  - Del tha Funky Homosapien, American hip-hop artist
  - Demir Demirkan, Turkish rock musician and songwriter
- August 15 – Yoo Jae-suk, South Korean comedian and television personality
- August 15 – Mikey Graham, Irish singer (Boyzone)
- August 16
  - Emily Robison, American country music performer (Dixie Chicks)
  - Kim Ji-hyun, South Korean singer and actress (Roo'ra)
- August 18
  - Leo Ku, Hong Kong actor and singer
  - Keiko Yamada, Japanese singer (Globe)
  - Malice, American rapper (Clipse)
- August 19 – Sammi Cheng, Hong Kong singer and actress
- August 26 – Kim Burrell, American singer, songwriter and pastor
- August 27 – Jimmy Pop, American musician (Bloodhound Gang)
- August 29
  - Amanda Marshall, Canadian singer-songwriter
  - Bae Yong-joon, South Korean actor and businessman
- August 30 – Cameron Diaz, American actress
- September 4 – Carlos Ponce, Puerto Rican actor, singer, composer
- September 6
  - Idris Elba, English actor, producer, musician and DJ
  - Oh Yong-ran, South Korean handball player
- September 9 – Roots Manuva, English rapper and producer
- September 13 – Kelly Chen, Hong Kong singer and actress
- September 21
  - Liam Gallagher, British singer (Oasis)
  - David Silveria, American musician (Korn)
- September 23 – Sam Bettens, Belgian musician (K's Choice)
- September 23 – Jermaine Dupri, American rapper, record producer, musician
- September 24 – Queen Pen, American rapper
- September 27 – Lhasa de Sela, American-Canadian singer-songwriter (d. 2010)
- September 26 – Shawn Stockman, American singer (Boyz II Men)
- September 28
  - Dita Von Teese, American vedette, burlesque dancer, model, businesswoman and singer (worked with Sebastien Tellier)
  - Kevin MacLeod, American composer and music producer
- September 30 – Shaan, Indian singer
- October 3
  - G. Love, American musician (G. Love and Special Sauce)
  - Josie d'Arby, Welsh television presenter and painter
- October 6 – Ko So-young, South Korean actress and model
- October 8
  - Kim Myung-min, South Korean actor
  - Terry Balsamo, American guitarist (Evanescence, Cold, Limp Bizkit)
- October 10 – Tor Erik Hermansen, American record producer and songwriter of the team Stargate (music producers)
- October 14 – Nick Fyffe, English bassist (Jamiroquai)
- October 15 – Sandra Kim, Belgian singer
- October 17
  - Eminem, American rapper, producer, record producer, musician, business man (D12 and Soul Intent (group))
  - Tarkan, Turkish singer
- October 6 – Anders Iwers, Swedish heavy metal guitarist
- October 19 – Pras (Michél), American rapper, hip hop musician, record producer, songwriter and actor (Fugees)
- October 20
  - Stephan Moccio, Canadian pianist, composer, producer, arranger and conductor
  - Solarstone, English trance DJ and producer
- October 21 – Matthew Friedberger, American singer, songwriter and multi-instrumentalist (The Fiery Furnaces)
- October 27 – Brad Radke, American baseball pitcher
- October 28 – Brad Paisley, American country music performer
- October 29 – Tracee Ellis Ross, American actress
- November 1
  - Samantha Womack, English singer, actress, model and director
  - Jenny McCarthy, American actress, model, television personality, and anti-vaccine activist
- November 9 – Christian Scharnweber, German trance disc jockey
- November 10 – Justin Trosper, American musician, songwriter, and record producer (Unwound)
- November 14
  - Dougie Payne, Scottish bassist (Travis)
  - Edyta Górniak, Polish pop singer
- November 17 – Kimya Dawson, American singer/songwriter
- November 22 – Eliana, Brazilian TV host, businesswoman, and singer
- November 25 – Mark Morton, American heavy metal guitarist (Lamb of God)
- November 28 – Jesper Strömblad, Swedish death metal guitarist
- December 1 – Greg Upchurch, American rock drummer (Puddle of Mudd, 3 Doors Down)
- December 4 – Justin Welch, English drummer (The Jesus and Mary Chain, Elastica, Suede, Lush)
- December 9 – Tré Cool, German-born American musician, drummer and composer (Green Day)
- December 10
  - Scot Alexander, American alternative rock bass guitarist (Dishwalla)
  - Brian Molko, British rock singer (Placebo)
  - Mikkel Storleer Eriksen, American songwriter and producer of the team Stargate (music producers)
- December 11 – Easther Bennett, British singer (Eternal)
- December 12 – Kevin Parent, Canadian singer-songwriter and actor
- December 13 – Niki Evans, English actress and singer
- December 15, Jason Nevins, American songwriter, record producer and remixer
- December 16 – Ben Kowalewicz, Canadian rock lead singer (Billy Talent)
- December 18
  - DJ Lethal, Latvian-born rock musician (Limp Bizkit, House of Pain)
  - Eimear Quinn, Irish singer and composer
- December 19 – Alyssa Milano, American activist, advocate, producer, singer and actress
- December 22 – Vanessa Paradis, French singer and actress
- December 23 - Morgan (singer), Italian musician and singer
- December 25 - Josh Freese, American rock drummer
- December 27 – Matt Slocum, American pop guitarist-composer and multi-instrumentalist (Sixpence None the Richer)
- December 31 – Joey McIntyre, American singer (New Kids on the Block)

== Deaths ==
- January 1 – Maurice Chevalier, 83, French singer and actor
- January 16 – David Seville, 52, voice of the Chipmunks
- January 19 – Michael Rabin, 35, violinist (fell downstairs)
- January 20 – Jean Casadesus, 44, French pianist (car accident)
- January 23 – Big Maybelle, 47, singer and pianist
- January 24 – Gene Austin, 69, singer-songwriter
- January 27 – Mahalia Jackson, 61, gospel singer
- January 29 – Margherita Grandi, 77, operatic soprano
- February 8 – Markos Vamvakaris, 66, Greek composer
- February 11 – Rudi Gfaller, Austrian operetta singer and composer (b. 1882)
- February 19 – Lee Morgan, 33, hard bop trumpeter
- February 21 – Marie Dubas, 77, French music-hall singer
- March 2 – Erna Sack, 74, coloratura soprano (cancer)
- March 17 – Linda Jones, 27, soul singer (diabetic coma)
- March 27 – Sharkey Bonano, 67, jazz musician and bandleader
- April 3 – Ferde Grofé, 80, composer, arranger, and pianist
- April 4 – Stefan Wolpe, 69, composer
- May 2 – Les Harvey, 27, guitarist (Stone the Crows) (electrocuted on stage)
- May 5 – Reverend Gary Davis, 76, blues and gospel singer and guitarist
- May 12 – David Hughes, 43, operatic tenor (heart failure)
- June 8 – Jimmy Rushing, 70, blues and jazz singer
- June 13 – Clyde McPhatter, 39, R&B singer
- July 3 – "Mississippi" Fred McDowell, 68, blues musician
- July 9 – Robert Weede, 69, operatic baritone
- July 10 – Lovie Austin, 84, American pianist, composer, and bandleader
- July 15 –Francisco González Gamarra, 82, composer and painter
- July 24 – Bobby Ramirez, drummer (Edgar Winter's White Trash)
- July 28 – Helen Traubel, 73, operatic soprano
- August 2
  - Brian Cole, 29, bass player in The Association (drug overdose)
  - Rudolph Ganz, 95, Swiss pianist, conductor and composer
- August 14 – Oscar Levant, 65, pianist and composer
- August 21 – Yvonne Gall, 87, operatic soprano
- August 29 – Lale Andersen, 67, Danish singer
- August 31 – Dalva de Oliveira, 55, Brazilian singer (internal bleeding)
- September 19 – Robert Casadesus, French pianist and composer, 73
- September 24 – Alfred Kalmus, music publisher, 93
- September 28 – Rory Storm, 33, English singer (appendicitis)
- September 30 – Grigore Cugler, 69, Romanian riter, artist, composer and violinist
- October 3 – Kari Aarvold Glaser, 71, Norwegian pianist and music teacher
- October 24 – Thelma Votipka, 67, operatic mezzo-soprano
- November 3 – Harry Richman, 77, US singer, actor and composer
- November 6 – Billy Murcia, 21, drummer of New York Dolls (suffocation)
- November 11 – Berry Oakley, 24, bass player (The Allman Brothers Band) (motorcycle accident)
- November 12 – Rudolf Friml, 92, Rose-Marie composer
- November 18 – Danny Whitten, 29, guitarist (Crazy Horse) (drug overdose)
- November 28 – Havergal Brian, 96, English classical composer
- November 30 – Hans Erich Apostel, 71, Austrian composer
- December 3 – Bill Johnson, 100, African American Dixieland jazz double-bassist

== Awards ==
=== Grammy Awards ===
- Grammy Awards of 1972
  - Grammy Album of the Year: The Concert for Bangladesh
  - Grammy Best New Artist: America
  - Grammy Best Album Design: "School's Out" – Alice Cooper
  - Grammy Best Pop Duo or Group: "Where Is the Love" – Roberta Flack and Donny Hathaway
  - Grammy Best Pop Female Vocal: "I Am Woman" – Helen Reddy
  - Grammy Best Pop Male Vocal: "Without You" – Harry Nilsson
  - Grammy Best R&B Duo or Group: "Papa Was A Rollin' Stone" – The Temptations
  - Grammy Best R&B Female Vocal: "Young, Gifted And Black" – Aretha Franklin
  - Grammy Best R&B Male Vocal: "Me And Mrs. Jones" – Billy Paul
  - Grammy Record of the Year: "The First Time Ever I Saw Your Face" – Roberta Flack
  - Grammy Song of the Year: "The First Time Ever I Saw Your Face" – Roberta Flack

=== Eurovision Song Contest ===
- Eurovision Song Contest 1972

=== Leeds Piano Competition ===
- Murray Perahia
