= O'Keefe (album) =

Studio album by Danny O'Keefe
- Released: 1972
- Genre: Pop, rock
- Length: 38:39
- Label: Signpost Records/Atlantic
- Producer: Arif Mardin

Danny O'Keefe chronology
Danny O'Keefe (1970)	O'Keefe (1972)	Breezy Stories (1973)

O'Keefe is an album by singer-songwriter Danny O'Keefe, released in 1972 (see 1972 in music). It peaked at #87 on the Billboard Top LPs chart. The lead-off single was "Good Time Charlie's Got the Blues" (a re-recording of a song O'Keefe had first recorded for his self-titled debut album two years earlier), which reached #9 on the Billboard Hot 100 chart and was covered by numerous artists. "The Road" was covered by Jackson Browne on his album Running on Empty. O'Keefe was reissued in 2006 on the Wounded Bird label.

== Reception ==
Professional ratings
Review scores
Source	Rating
Allmusic	4.5/5 stars
Christgau's Record Guide	B

Thom Jurek states in his Allmusic review: "O'Keefe is utterly solid, so completely diverse, and tight; it's a forgotten masterpiece."

== Track listing ==
All songs by Danny O'Keefe unless otherwise noted.

1. "Good Time Charlie's Got the Blues" – 3:00
2. "Shooting Star" – 2:39
3. "The Question (Obviously)" – 3:39
4. "Honky Tonkin'" (Hank Williams) – 2:49
5. "The Road" – 3:49
6. "Grease It" – 3:16
7. "An American Dream" – 5:14
8. "Louie the Hook vs. the Preacher" – 3:37
9. "The Valentine Pieces" – 3:17
10. "I'm Sober Now" – 2:45
11. "Roseland Taxi Dancer" – 2:47
12. "I Know You Really Love Me" – 0:59

== Personnel ==
- Danny O'Keefe – vocals, lead acoustic guitar, lead electric guitar
- Hayward Bishop – drums, percussion
- David Brigati – backing vocals
- Eddie Brigati – backing vocals
- Gene Chrisman – drums
- Johnny Christopher – acoustic guitar
- Bobby Emmons – organ
- Shane Keister – piano
- Bobby Wood – piano, electric piano
- Reggie Young – electric guitar
- Leo LeBlanc – steel guitar
- Mike Leech – bass
- Irwin "Marky" Markowitz – trumpet
- Howard McNatt – violin
- Phil Olivella – clarinet

Production notes:

- Arif Mardin – producer, mixing
- Ahmet Ertegun, Neil Rosengarden - assistant producers
- Stan Kesler – engineer
- Gene Paul – engineer
- George Hunter – design
- L.K. Hollister - cover illustration
