= No Time to Burn =

No Time To Burn

Studio album by Black Heat
- Released: 1974
- Recorded: 1974 at Atlantic Recording Studios & Regent Sound Studios, New York City, New York
- Genre: Soul; Funk
- Length: 46:01
- Label: Atlantic Records
- Producer: Joel Dorn; Jimmy Douglass

Black Heat chronology
Black Heat (1972)	No Time To Burn (1974)	Keep on Runnin (1975)

No Time To Burn is the second album by funk group Black Heat.

== Reception ==
Professional ratings
Review scores
Source	Rating
Allmusic	2/5 stars

Released in 1974. Produced by Joel Dorn and Jimmy Douglass.

== Track listing ==
1. No Time To Burn 3:43
2. You Should've Listened 5:34
3. Check It All Out 6:58
4. Love The Life You Live 6:33
5. Super Cool 3:58
6. M & M's 6:53
7. Things Change 5:02
8. Rapid Fire 1:33
9. Times Have Changed 5:39

== Personnel ==
- Johnell Gray - Keyboards, Vocals
- Naamon Jones - Bass, Vocals
- Bradley Owens - Guitar, Vocals
- Esco Cromer - Drums, Percussion, Vocals
- Rodney Edwards - Trumpet, Timbales
- Ray Thompson - Saxophone, Flute, Woodwind
- Raymond Green - Congas, Percussion, Vocals

== Charts ==
Chart (1974)	Peak position
Billboard Pop Albums	201
Billboard Top Soul Albums	58

=== Singles ===
Year	Single	Chart positions
Year	Single	US R&B
1974	"No Time To Burn"	46
