= I'll Make You Music =

Single by Beverly Bremers

from the album I'll Make You Music
- B-side: "I Made a Man Out of You, Jimmy"
- Released: September 1972
- Studio: Scepter Recording Studios
- Genre: Pop
- Length: 3:02
- Label: Scepter
- Songwriter: Bruce Roberts
- Producers: Steve Metz, David Lipton, Norman Bergen

Beverly Bremers singles chronology
"I Just Need Some Music" (1972)	"I'll Make You Music" (1972)	"Heaven Help Us" (1972)

"I'll Make You Music" is a song written by Bruce Roberts and performed by Beverly Bremers. It reached No. 18 on the Billboard easy listening chart and No. 63 on the Billboard Hot 100 in 1972.

The song was featured on her 1972 album, I'll Make You Music. The song was produced by Steve Metz, David Lipton, and Norman Bergen and arranged by Bergen.

== Other versions ==
- Peta Toppano released a version of the song as a single in Australia in 1973.

== Personnel ==
- Beverly Bremers: Lead vocals
- Helen Miles, Maeretha Stewart, and Patti Austin: Background vocals
- Joe Mack (Joe Macho, Jr.): Bass
- Don Thomas: Guitar
- Jimmy Young: Drums
- Keyboards: Norman Bergen
