= Live at the Padget Rooms, Penarth =

Live album by Man
- Released: September 1972
- Recorded: 8 April 1972
- Genre: Stoner rock; jazz fusion
- Length: 37:59
- Label: United Artists – USP 100
- Producer: Vic Maile

Man chronology
Greasy Truckers Party (1972)	Live at the Padget Rooms, Penarth (1972)	Be Good to Yourself at Least Once a Day (1972)

Professional ratings
Review scores
Source	Rating
Allmusic	4/5 stars
DPRP	(7.25/10)

Live at the Padget Rooms, Penarth is the fifth album by Man, released in September 1972. It was the band’s first live album although they had previously been featured on two tracks totalling 26m 46s (Spunk Rock and Angel Easy) on a "various artists" live double album, Greasy Truckers Party released earlier in 1972. Both sets were performed by this four-piece line-up, although the line up had substantially changed before this album was released, as was acknowledged on the original LP sleeve. The two Greasy Truckers Party tracks were released on their own as a Man album in 1997 on Point Records.

The idea for a live album came from Andrew Lauder, United Artists’ A&R manager, following the success of Man’s contributions to the Greasy Truckers Party benefit album, recorded at the Roundhouse in February 1972. It was agreed to record the album on “home territory” in South Wales at the Paget Rooms, Penarth, a seaside resort at the south end of Cardiff Bay. The title was considered an oddity in Penarth at the time, because of the misspelling of Paget Rooms in the album's title, as can be seen in the photo of the venue in the CD re-release.

The front cover states “Special Limited Edition For Man Fans” and only 8000 copies were pressed. These were sold at a budget-price and sold out within a week, so it entered the UK mid-priced LP chart at number one, and the next week had totally disappeared. It was then unavailable for 30 years until it was released on CD in 2002 (BGO CD 365).

== Reception ==
According to Dave Thompson, it "ranks among the all-time greatest Man concert recordings, the sound of the band at the peak of its game", "with a raw sound that seems to spill straight out of the amps." The first two tracks were live versions of songs on previous studio albums, but "H. Samuel" is an improvised jam “hovering closer to the brink of a massive stoner rock-jazz fusion hybrid than any other Man album ever dared to.”

== Releases ==
The original album comprised just three tracks, which appeared out of sequence, so as to fit on a vinyl LP. This track sequence was retained on the 2002 CD. It was not until the 2007 re-release on a double CD (ECLEC 2014), that the full concert became available, and the original running order was restored

== Track listing ==
=== Original LP ===
Side one
No.	Title	Writer(s)	Length
1.	"Many Are Called But Few Get Up"	Ace, John, Jones, Leonard, Williams	10:59
2.	"Daughter of the Fireplace"	Leonard	7:59

Side two
No.	Title	Writer(s)	Length
1.	"H. Samuel (Jam)"	Ace, Jones, Leonard, Williams	19:01

=== 1997 CD ===
As Original LP

=== 2007 CD Re-Release ===
This was re-mixed from the original 8 track master tapes and restores the original running order.
There are no composer credits, or track timings, on the re-release. Composers are listed based on original album releases.

Disc one

No.	Title	Writer(s)	Length
1.	"Spunk Rock"	John, Jones	24.49
2.	"Many Are Called But Few Get Up"	Ace, John, Jones, Leonard, Williams	10.42
3.	"Angel Easy"	Ace, John, Jones, Leonard, Williams	5.16

Disc two

No.	Title	Writer(s)	Length
1.	"H. Samuel (Jam)"	Ace, Jones, Leonard, Williams	19.27
2.	"Romain"	Ace, John, Jones, Leonard, Williams	20.36
3.	"Daughter of the Fireplace"	Leonard	7.57

== Personnel ==
- Michael Jones — guitars, vocals (Mick Jones on the initial CD and Micky Jones on the re-release)
- Deke Leonard — guitars, vocals
- Martin Ace — bass vocals
- Terry Williams — drums
- Vic Maile — audio engineer, mixing
- Man — producer (Original Album)
- Mark Powell & Ben Wiseman — producers & mixers (2007 Remixed album)
- Deke Leonard — liner notes
- Phil Smee — design
