= Keep On Runnin' =

Studio album by Black Heat
- Released: 1975
- Recorded: 1975 at Atlantic Recording Studios, New York City; Track Recorders, Washington, D.C. Strings recorded at Sound City, Los Angeles, California
- Genre: Soul; Funk
- Length: 46:01
- Label: Atlantic Records
- Producer: Jimmy Douglass

Black Heat chronology
No Time to Burn (1974)	Keep On Runnin' (1975)

Keep On Runnin' is the third and final album by funk group Black Heat. It was released in 1975 and produced by the legendary Joel Dorn and Jimmy Douglass.

== Track listing ==
1. "Drive My Car" (John Lennon, Paul McCartney) – 3:05
2. "Zimba Ku" – 4:31
3. "Questions & Conclusions" – 4:09
4. "Something Extra" – 3:52
5. "Feel Like a Child" – 3:48
6. "Last Dance" – 2:38
7. "Baby You'll See" – 4:05
8. "Love" – 3:16
9. "Prince Duval" – 4:20
10. "Live Together" – 2:49
11. "Keep On Runnin'" – 5:48

== Personnel ==
- Johnell Gray – Keyboards, vocals
- Naamon Jones – Bass, lead vocals
- James Duval – Lead guitar, rhythm guitar
- Esco Cromer – Drums
- Rodney Edwards – Trumpet, flugelhorn
- Ray Thompson – Saxophone, flute
- Raymond Green – Congas
- Jimmy Douglass, Rodney Edwards – Bass
- Randy Brecker – Tenor saxophone
- Michael Brecker – Horn
- Tom Malone – Trombone
- Ken Bichel – Synthesizer

== Charts ==
Chart (1974)	Peak position
Billboard Top Soul Albums	51
