= I'll Make You Music (album) =

Studio album by Beverly Bremers
- Released: 1972
- Genre: Pop
- Length: 35:09
- Label: Scepter, Columbia
- Producer: David Lipton, Steve Metz

Singles from I'll Make You Music
- 1. "Don't Say You Don't Remember"/"Get Smart Girl" Released: May 1971; 2. "We're Free"/"Colors of Love" Released: May 1972; 3. "I'll Make You Music"/"I Made a Man Out of You, Jimmy" Released: September 1972

Professional ratings
Review scores
Source	Rating
Allmusic	3/5 stars

I'll Make You Music is the only album by Beverly Bremers and was released in 1972. It reached No. 124 on the Billboard Top LP's & Tape chart.

The album featured three singles: "Don't Say You Don't Remember", which reached #15 on the Billboard Hot 100, "We're Free", which reached #40, and "I'll Make You Music", which reached #63.

== Track listing ==
1. "I'll Make You Music" (Bruce Roberts) – 3:02
2. "I Made a Man Out of You, Jimmy" (Doc Pomus/Ken Hirsch) – 2:40
3. "A Guy Like You" (Eddie Brigati/Felix Cavaliere) – 3:15
4. "All That's Left Is the Music" (Roberts) – 2:52
5. "Colors of Love" (Mark Barkan/Norman Bergen) – 2:18
6. "We're Free" (Irwin Levine/L. Russell Brown) – 3:06
7. "Don't Say You Don't Remember" (Estelle Levitt/Helen Miller) – 3:24
8. "At My Place" (Vicki Gellman/Wendy Gell) – 2:44
9. "Poor Side of Town" (Johnny Rivers/Lou Adler) – 2:47
10. "Baby I Don't Know You" (Sandy Linzer/Steve Reinhardt) – 2:57
11. "Get Smart Girl" (Reinhardt) – 2:55
12. "May the Road Rise to Meet You" (Levine/Brown) – 3:09

== Personnel ==
- David Lipton – producer (tracks: 1–11)
- Steve Metz – producer (tracks: 1–11)
- Irwin Levine – producer (track: 12)
- L. Russell Brown – producer (track: 12)
- Mickey Eichner – producer (track: 12)
- Beverly Bremers – lead vocals
- Don Thomas – guitar
- Joe Mack – bass
- Norman Bergen – keyboards, arrangements

== Charts ==
Chart (1972)	Peak position
Billboard Top LP's & Tape	124

Singles

Year	Single	Chart	Position
1971	"Don't Say You Don't Remember"	US Pop	15
1971	"Don't Say You Don't Remember"	AC	5
1972	"We're Free"	US Pop	40
1972	"We're Free"	AC	15
1972	"I'll Make You Music"	US Pop	63
1972	"I'll Make You Music"	AC	18
