= We're Free =

Single by Beverly Bremers

from the album I'll Make You Music
- B-side: "Colors of Love"
- Released: May 1972
- Genre: Pop
- Length: 3:06
- Label: Scepter
- Songwriter(s): Irwin Levine, L. Russell Brown
- Producer(s): Irwin Levine, L. Russell Brown, Mickey Eichner

Beverly Bremers singles chronology
"When Michael Calls" (1971)	"We're Free" (1972)	"I Just Need Some Music" (1972)

"We're Free" is a song written by Irwin Levine and L. Russell Brown and performed by Beverly Bremers. It reached No. 15 on the Billboard easy listening chart and No. 40 on the Billboard Hot 100 in 1972. The song was featured on her 1972 album, I'll Make You Music.

The song was produced by Irwin Levine, L. Russell Brown, and Mickey Eichner and arranged by Norman Bergen.
