= Rolling Stone (Suzi Quatro song) =

Single by Suzi Quatro
- B-side: "Brain Confusion (For All the Lonely People)"
- Released: 1972
- Label: RAK
- Songwriters: Phil Dennys; Errol Brown; Suzi Quatro
- Producer: Mickie Most

Suzi Quatro singles chronology
"Rolling Stone" (1972)	"Can the Can" (1973)

"Rolling Stone" is Suzi Quatro's debut solo single released in 1972. Quatro's name was misspelled Susie Quatro on the initial packaging. The single was not successful, except in Portugal, where it went to number one.

== Background ==
It was Quatro's first solo single and was released after she moved from the United States to Britain. In the United States, she had already released two singles with the all-female band the Pleasure Seekers.

The B-side, "Brain Confusion (For All the Lonely People)", was written by Quatro and initially recorded while she was part of the Pleasure Seekers. The Pleasure Seekers became Cradle. When Mickie Most saw Quatro perform the song with Cradle he decided to sign her as a solo act. The version of the song on this single is a re-recording with Quatro and session players.

The song "Rolling Stone" was initially written by Phil Dennys, who did arrangements for the band Jade. The lyrics were rewritten by Hot Chocolate front man Errol Brown (and Quatro herself, uncredited) so they were more suitable for Quatro.

== Personnel ==
- Suzi Quatro – bass, lead vocals
- Peter Frampton – guitar
- Micky Waller – drums
- Errol Brown – backing vocals
