= Black Heat (album) =

Studio album by Black Heat
- Released: 1972
- Recorded: 1972 at Atlantic Recording Studios, New York City, New York
- Genre: Soul; Funk
- Length: 39:32
- Label: Atlantic Records
- Producer: Joel Dorn

Black Heat chronology
Black Heat (1972)	No Time to Burn (1974)

Professional ratings
Review scores
Source	Rating
Allmusic	3/5 stars

Black Heat is the debut album by funk group Black Heat, produced by Joel Dorn and released in 1972.

== Track listing ==
All tracks are written by Phil Guilbeau, except where noted

No.	Title	Length
1.	"The Jungle"	5:14
2.	"Chicken Heads" (Calvin Carter, Bobby Rush)	4:14
3.	"Street of Tears" (Johnell Gray, Bradley Owens)	3:44
4.	"Barbara's Mood" (Gray)	4:09
5.	"Chip's Funk"	3:32
6.	"Wanaoh" (Owens)	3:51
7.	"You'll Never Know"	3:39
8.	"Honey Love"	3:01
9.	"Send My Lover Back"	5:51
10.	"Time Is Gonna Catch You"	2:43
Total length:		39:32

== Personnel ==
- Johnell Gray - Organ, Vocals
- Naamon Jones - Bass, Vocals
- Bradley Owens - Guitar, Vocals
- Esco Cromer - Drums
- Phil Guilbeau - Trumpet
- King Raymond Green - Congas, Harmonica, Vocals
- David "Fathead" Newman - Tenor Sax
