= Good Time Charlie's Got the Blues =

Single by Danny O'Keefe

from the album O'Keefe
- B-side: "The Valentine Pieces"
- Released: August 1972
- Genre: Country, folk
- Length: 2:38 (Promo Version) 3:00 (Album/Single Version)
- Label: Signpost
- Songwriter: Danny O'Keefe
- Producer: Arif Mardin

Danny O'Keefe singles chronology
"Good Time Charlie's Got the Blues" (1972)	"The Road" (1972)

"Good Time Charlie's Got the Blues" is a song written and performed by American folk singer Danny O'Keefe.

It was first recorded by O'Keefe in 1967, but not released. It was recorded by The Bards and released in 1968 as the b-side to the song "Tunesmith" on Parrot Records. The Bards were a band from Moses Lake, Washington, United States. The song was recorded by O'Keefe for his self-titled debut album in 1971. The following year he re-recorded it (with a slower, more downbeat arrangement) for his second album, O'Keefe. The second version was issued as a single, reaching number 9 on the Billboard Hot 100 singles chart, number 5 on the adult contemporary chart, and number 63 on the country chart. The song was also recorded by Mel Tormé, especially for a 1986 episode of NBC's Night Court entitled "Leon, We Hardly Knew Ye".

It was recorded by numerous artists. A recording by Leon Russell peaked at number 63 on the Billboard Hot Country Singles chart in 1984.

== Charts ==
Chart (1972)	Peak position
Canada RPM Top Singles	19
US Billboard Hot 100	9
US Billboard Adult Contemporary	5
US Cash Box Top 100	10
Chart (1973)	Peak position
Australia (Kent Music Report)	53

== Selected list of recorded versions ==
- Waylon Jennings, on his 1973 album Lonesome, On'ry and Mean
- Nat Stuckey, on his 1973 album Take Time to Love Her
- Elvis Presley, on his 1974 album Good Times
- Conway Twitty, on his 1977 album Play Guitar Play
- Earl Klugh, on his 1978 album Magic in Your Eyes
- Josh Graves, on his 1979 album Sing Away the Pain
- Jerry Lee Lewis, on his 1980 album When Two Worlds Collide
- Charlie Rich, on his 1980 album Once a Drifter
- Chris Hillman, on his 1982 album Morning Sky
- Willie Nelson, on his 1984 album City of New Orleans
- Leon Russell, on his 1984 album Solid State
- Mel Tormé, for a 1986 Night Court episode entitled "Leon, We Hardly Knew Ye"
- Dwight Yoakam, on his 1997 album Under the Covers
- Harry Manx, on his 2008 album Live at the Glenn Gould Studio
- Holly Cole, on her 2012 album Night
- Rita Wilson, on her 2012 album AM/FM
- Shooter Jennings and Waymore's Outlaws, on the Black Country Rock 2016 Mixtape
- Charley Crockett, on his 2018 album, Lil G.L.'s Blue Bonanza
- Ronnie Dunn, on his 2020 album Re-Dunn
- Parker McCollum, on his 2025 album Parker McCollum
