= Kiyoshige Koyama =

Japanese composer

- Born: January 15, 1914; Nagano prefecture, Japan
- Died: June 15, 2009 (aged 95)
- Other name: 小山 清茂
- Occupation: composer

Kiyoshige Koyama (小山 清茂, Koyama Kiyoshige; January 15, 1914 – June 6, 2009), was a Japanese composer for orchestras, vocal, and traditional Japanese instrumentation. He was born in Nagano City, Nagano Prefecture. Although nationalistic he did not compose until his thirties, which was after the period of Imperial expansionism.

== Selection of works ==
Many works by Koyama are published by Ongaku-no-tomo-sha.

=== Orchestral ===
- 1946 Shinano bayashi for Orchestra
- 1953/1958 Japanese Folk Songs for Chamber Orchestra
- 1957 Kobiki-Uta (Woodcutter's Song) for Orchestra
- 1959 Symphonic Suite "Nohmen" (Masks for Play)
- 1964 Ainu no Uta for string orchestra
- 1976 Hinauta No. 1 for Orchestra
- 1978 Hinauta No. 2 for Orchestra
- 1981 Hinauta No. 3 for orchestra
- 1988 Hinauta No. 4 for orchestra

=== Wind orchestra ===
- 1970 Kobiki-uta for band
- 1970 Mogura-oi
- 1970 Otemoyan
- 1970 Echigo-jishi
- 1970 Dai-kagura
- 1980 Flow Festival
- 1991 Hinauta No. 5
- 1993 Noh-men

=== Choral ===
- Lullaby of Itsuki

=== Piano ===
- 1966 Kagome Variations
- 1969 Variations on "Kari kari watare"
- Children Songs for piano
- Collection of piano pieces
- Intro to piano thru Japanese harmony
- Coming Summer (Natsu wa kinu)

=== Traditional Japanese instruments ===
- 1962 Ubusuna for koto and other Japanese musical instruments
- 1962 Quartet No. 1 for Japanese instruments
- 1963 Okume - Okiku
- 1964 Wagakki no tame no gassōkyoku
- 1965 Urashima Taro kodomo no yume
- 1966 Fudo yonsho
- 1968 Trio for 2 koto and jūshichi-gen
- 1968 Quartet No. 2 "Theme and Variations" for Japanese instruments
- 1971 Akatsuchi ni naru imōto
- 1973 Wagakki no tame no gojūsōkyoku, Quintet for Japanese instruments
- 1976 Chidori ni yoru hen'yō (Transfiguration by Chidori)
- 1978 Wagakki no tame no hensōkyoku, Variations for Japanese instruments
- 1980 Hagoromo
- 1985 Nenyamonya Hensōkyoku (Nenyamonya Variations)
- 1996 Sakura sakura for koto ensemble
- Tenchi sosei
- Trio for 2 koto and jūshichi-gen

=== Operas ===
- 1972 Sansho Dayu
- 1974 Konyaku Mondo
