= Black Heat =

American funk band

Black Heat was a 1970s funk band founded by King Raymond Green and discovered by Phillip Guilbeau. They released three albums: Black Heat (with guest artist David "Fathead" Newman), No Time To Burn and Keep On Runnin'. The group had one hit single, "No Time to Burn", which reached the top 50 in the Billboard R&B chart.

In 2001, Label M released a CD reissue of their first two albums under the title Declassified Grooves. They had recently appeared at a memorial concert for Joel Dorn, their original producer at Atlantic Records. It was the first time they had reunited in over 34 years.

== Members ==
- Johnell Gray - keyboards, vocals
- Bradley Owens - guitar, vocals
- Chip Jones - bass guitar, vocals
- King Raymond Green - congas, timbales, harmonica and vocals
- Esco Cromer - drums, vocals
- Ray Thompson - woodwind
- Rodney Edwards - trumpet

== Guest musicians ==
- Ralph MacDonald
- David Newman

== Discography ==
- Black Heat (Atlantic Records, 1972)
- No Time to Burn (Atlantic, 1974) U.S. R&B #58, U.S. #201
- Keep on Runnin (Atlantic, 1975) U.S. R&B #51
