= Beverly Bremers =

American singer and actress

- Born: March 10, 1950 (age 75); Chicago, Illinois
- Known for: Broadway theater

Beverly Ann Bremers (born March 10, 1950) is an American singer and actress. After roles on Broadway, Bremers recorded the 1972 Top 20 hit single, "Don't Say You Don't Remember".

== Early life/ career ==
Beverly Bremers - her surname is pronounced breemɛrs (rhymes with dreamers) - was born in Chicago, but within three years had relocated with her family to St. Louis. Bremers had sung for fun from an early age and, at age eight, she began studying acting. After relocating with her family to the New York City area when she was aged ten, Bremers began singing in local talent shows. She performed on the Ted Mack Amateur Hour on her thirteenth birthday and made her recording debut at age 14 with a 1965 single release on Pickwick Records' Showcase label – – “We Got Trouble” and a remake of "The Great Pretender" – with two subsequent RCA Records single releases, the first in June 1967 and the second in February 1968; all three of these singles were credited to Beverly Ann. Bremers joined the musical Hair early in its Broadway run, playing Chrissy. She then, in 1970, was an original cast member of the Obie Award-winning off-Broadway musical The Me Nobody Knows, in which she played Catherine. She reprised her role in the Broadway production and then returned to Hair playing the female lead, Sheila, during the final phase of that show's original Broadway run. Bremers was credited during her initial run in Hair and in The Me Nobody Knows as Beverly Ann Bremers.

== Chart success ==
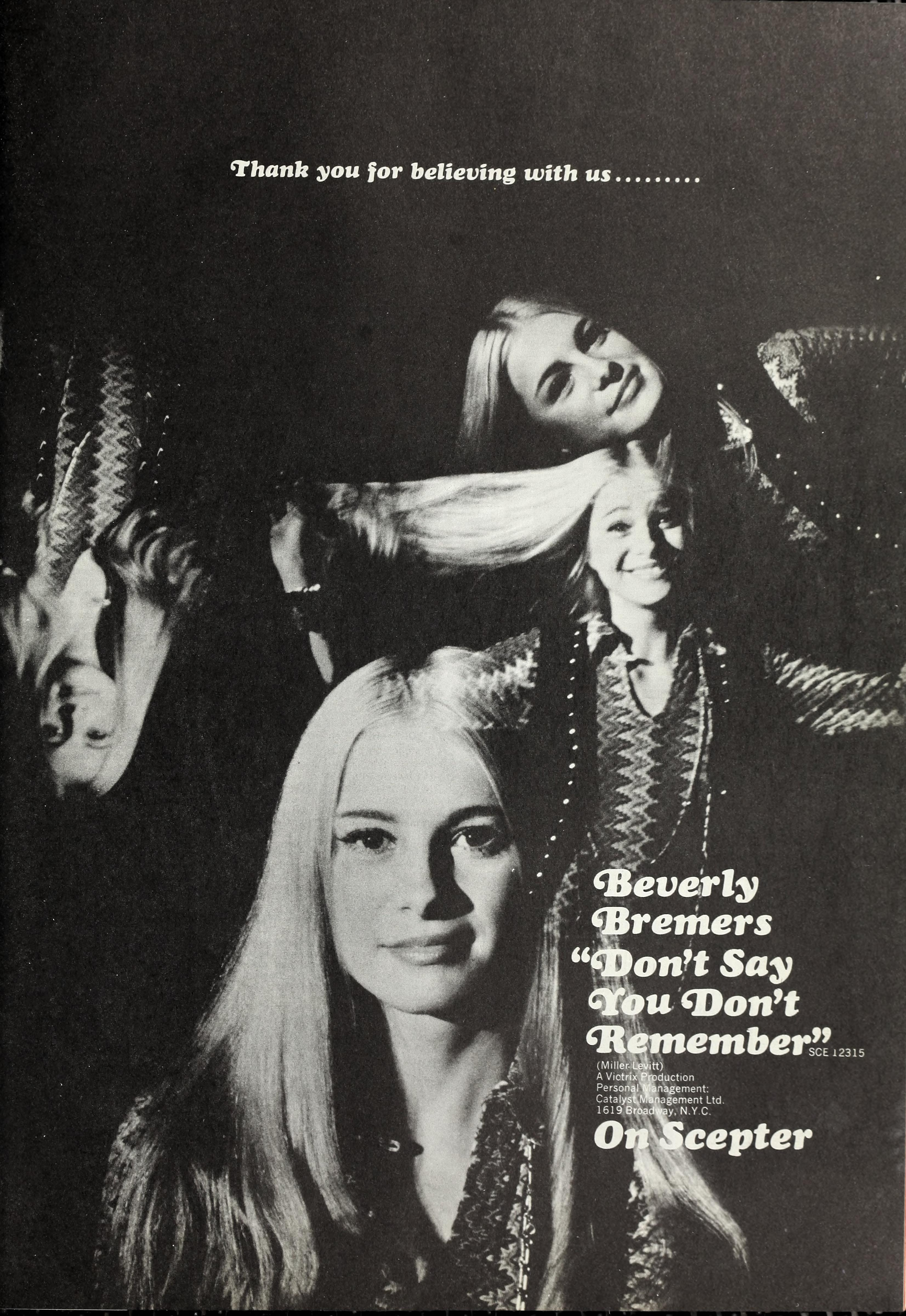
Cashbox advertisement, January 22, 1972

Through recording the original cast album for The Me Nobody Knows, Bremers met David Lipton, a music publishing house executive she would eventually marry. Lipton solicited "Don't Say You Don't Remember" from staff writers Helen Miller and Estelle Levitt for Bremers to record with the resultant master - deliberately styled to evoke the 1960s girl-group sound - being successfully shopped to Scepter Records and released in May 1971. It rose as high as #10 on the Easy Listening chart in Billboard magazine; it just failed to cross over to the Billboard Hot 100, stalling at #102 (see Bubbling Under Hot 100 Singles). The follow-up single, "When Michael Calls", co-written by Bruce Springsteen’s manager, Mike Appel, had been readied when "Don't Say You Don't Remember" belatedly became a local smash in San Jose, with enough subsequent interest in other markets to debut at #98 on the Hot 100 dated December 18, 1971 entering the Top 40 dated January 22, 1972 to rise to a #15 peak on the Hot 100 on February 26, 1972.

As Bremers had returned to the Broadway production of Hair, she was unable to do promotion for her single during its Top 40 run; she did, however, perform "Don't Say You Don't Remember" on the April 22, 1972 broadcast of American Bandstand, also performing the follow-up single: the controversial free love anthem "We're Free", which peaked that month at #40, its mild chart-showing mitigated by an extensive radio-station boycott. Bremers comments on the surprise success of "We're Free":

“We’re Free,” was banned on a lot of stations, which sounds hilarious now. Back then a lot of people didn’t like the (idea) of living together without being married. That was the theme of the song and ironically it was a huge country hit. The Bible Belt didn’t care. It never got airplay on the coasts, but it was huge in Canada and in the South and the mid-West. It made the Country charts.

Bremers' next single "I'll Make You Music" marked her third and final Hot 100 appearance, reaching #63 in the autumn of 1972: all three of Bremers' chart singles were featured on her I'll Make You Music album which the Billboard Album Chart ranked with a #124 peak. [1] A later release, "Heaven Help Us", the first recorded song written by Melissa Manchester with lyricist Carole Bayer Sager, was featured as the closing credits’ song for George A. Romero's 1973 horror film The Crazies.

== Later career ==
After three non-charting single releases on Scepter, Bremers then released singles on Columbia Records in 1975 and 1976. In 1979, Bremers co-wrote and recorded the disco single "Morning Music" with Jackie English (who also recorded a version of the song) as the group Siren; the song was released on Midsong Records, reaching #94 on the Hot 100 in December 1980, and was featured in the film Hopscotch. ("Morning Music" would later be a hit in the Netherlands for Kelly Page (#35/ 1983).) In 1980, Bremers represented the United States in the Seoul International Song Festival, performing the song "Growing Up to Goodbyes", which she also co-wrote with Jackie English; the song was declared the winner of the Gold Prize.

Bremers' greatest success as a songwriter has been as the composer of the theme from the Disney Channel series Mousercise, which earned Bremers a platinum record. Bremers has also written the score for five musicals produced in Los Angeles and San Diego. In 2005, Bremers released a new album entitled Don't Say You Don't Remember Beverly Bremers, which included a re-recording of "Don't Say You Don't Remember" as well as new, original material.

Bremers has performed extensively in clubs and concerts in the U.S.; in television commercials; radio; films and games. She is also a well-respected vocal coach. Her most recent tour was in 2018.

== Discography ==
=== Albums ===
Year	Album	Peak chart positions	Record label
Year	Album	Billboard 200	Record label
1972	I'll Make You Music	124	Scepter Records/Columbia

=== Singles ===
Year	Title	Peak chart positions		Record Label	B-side	Album
Year	Title	US	US AC	Record Label	B-side	Album
1967	"He's Coming Home" (as Beverly Ann)	—	—	RCA Victor	"He Won't See the Light"	
1968	"You've Got Your Mind on Other Things" (as Beverly Ann)	—	—	RCA Victor	"Until You"	
1971	"Don't Say You Don't Remember"	15	5	Scepter Records/Columbia	"Get Smart Girl"	I'll Make You Music
1971	"When Michael Calls"	—	—	Scepter Records/Columbia	"Toy Girl"	
1972	"We're Free"	40	15	Scepter Records/Columbia	"Colors of Love"	I'll Make You Music
1972	"I Just Need Some Music"	—	—	Brut Productions	"Let It Play On"	
1972	"I'll Make You Music"	63	18	Scepter Records/Columbia	"I Made a Man Out of You, Jimmy"	I'll Make You Music
1972	"Heaven Help Us"	110	—	Scepter Records/Columbia	"All That's Left Is the Music"	
1973	"Run to Her"	—	—	Scepter Records/Columbia	"Baby I Don't Know You"	
1973	"Daddy's Coming Home"	—	—	Scepter Records/Columbia	"A Little Bit of Love"	
1974	"Sing a Happy Song"	—	—	Scepter Records/Columbia	"Get Smart Girl"	
1974	"Get Up in the Morning"	—	—	Scepter Records/Columbia	"One Day at a Time"	
1975	"What I Did for Love"	—	—	Columbia Records	"You're Precious to Me"	
1976	"Flight 309 to Tennessee"	—	—	Columbia Records	"The Prisoner"	
