= Danny O'Keefe =

American singer-songwriter

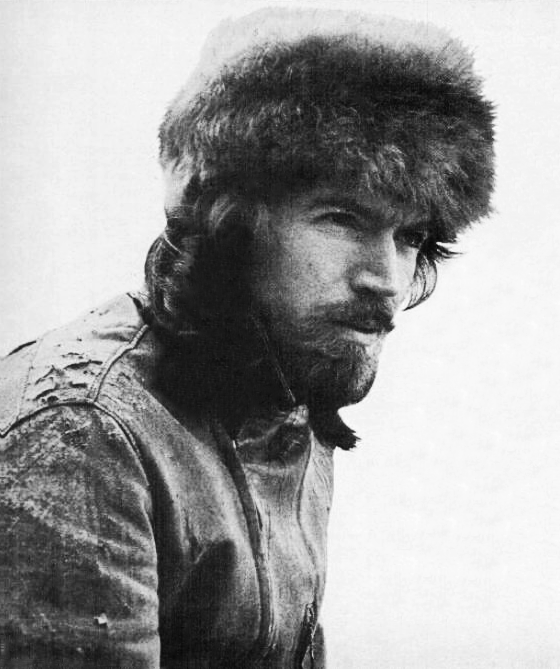
- Danny O'Keefe in 1972

Background information
- Born: May 13, 1943 (age 83); Spokane, Washington
- Genre: Folk
- Occupation: Musician
- Instruments: Vocals, guitar, piano
- Years active: 1960s–present
- Labels: Cotillion, Atlantic, Warner Bros.

Danny O'Keefe is an American folk singer and songwriter.

== Career ==
In 1968, O'Keefe was a member of a four-man heavy psychedelic rock band named the Calliope. The group recorded one album, Steamed, for Buddah Records before disbanding.

O'Keefe is best known for the hit single, "Good Time Charlie's Got the Blues", which was released in September 1972, and reached number 9 on the U.S. Billboard Hot 100 chart, and for "The Road", covered by Jackson Browne on Running on Empty. "Good Time Charlie" stayed on the Billboard chart for 14 weeks and sold a million copies. The RIAA issued a gold disc in June 1973. The song became O'Keefe's only song to reach the Australian top 100, peaking at number 53 in February 1973. In Canada, an earlier single, Covered Wagon, reached number 86 on March 6, 1971.

O'Keefe's songs have been covered by numerous musicians, including Jackson Browne ("The Road"), Gary Stewart ("Quits"), Elvis Presley, Glen Campbell ("Quits"), John Denver ("Along for the Ride"), Donny Hathaway ("Magdalena"), Leo Sayer ("Magdalena"), Jerry Lee Lewis, Judy Collins ("Angel Spread Your Wings"), Leon Russell, Willie Nelson, Waylon Jennings, Jimmy Buffett ("Souvenirs"), Alison Krauss, Ben Harper, Cab Calloway, Mark-Almond, Andy Williams, and Dwight Yoakam ("Under the Covers"). In Italy his song "The Road" has been covered by Ron, with Italian lyrics written by Lucio Dalla (and re-titled "Una città per cantare").

In 2023, O'Keefe released Circular Turns.

== Discography ==
- Introducing Danny O'Keefe (Panorama, 1966)
- Danny O'Keefe (Cotillion, 1970)
- O'Keefe (Signpost, 1972)
- Breezy Stories (Atlantic, 1973)
- So Long Harry Truman (Atlantic, 1975)
- American Roulette (Warner Bros., 1977)
- The Seattle Tapes (First American, 1977)
- The Seattle Tapes Vol. II (First American, 1978)
- The Global Blues (Warner Bros., 1979)
- The Day to Day (Coldwater, 1984)
- Redux (Beachwood, 1989)
- Runnin' from the Devil (Miramar, 1999)
- Don't Ask (with Bill Braun) (Bicameral Songs, 2003)
- In Time (Bicameral Songs, 2008)
- Light Leaves the West (Road Canon Music, 2015)
- Home (Road Canon Music, 2017)
- Looking Glass & The Dreamers (Road Canon Music, 2020)
- Circular Turns (Sunset Blvd, 2023)
