= Be Good to Yourself at Least Once a Day =

Studio album by Man
- Released: November 1972
- Recorded: September 1972
- Studios: Rockfield Studios, Monmouth, Wales
- Length: 36:03
- Label: United Artists UAG 29417
- Producers: Man, Dave Edmunds

Man chronology
Live at the Padget Rooms, Penarth (1972)	Be Good to Yourself at Least Once a Day (1972)	Christmas at the Patti (1973)

Professional ratings
Review scores
Source	Rating
AllMusic	4/5 stars
Christgau's Record Guide	B
DPRP	(8/10)

Be Good to Yourself at Least Once a Day is the sixth album by the Welsh rock band Man. Issued just two months after the previous album, Live at the Padget Rooms, Penarth, it features a radically different line-up. Martin Ace having left, and Deke Leonard having been fired, Clive John returned, bringing with him Phil Ryan and Will Youatt, with whom Clive had formed Iorwerth Pritchard and the Neutrons when he left Man in 1971. This is the only studio album by this particular line-up, which also recorded the live Christmas at the Patti before Clive John left again.

The LP had a prize-winning gatefold sleeve that, when opened, unfolded a 2' by 2' (61 cm by 61 cm) cartoon map of Wales, showing the origins of numerous Welsh bands, including Man, and other places of interest. The country was shown as an island, separated from England by a large channel of water, and being pushed away from her neighbour by ten men using long poles.

The inner sleeve featured 'Man's Family Jungle', Man's family tree, similar to those prepared by Pete Frame, but in a scrawled version drawn by Leonard, despite him having been recently fired from the band, as is acknowledged on the chart. On the earlier CD issues (prior to 2007) the map was unreadably small and the 'Family Jungle' was missing. Due to the complications of a previous publishing contract, newly arrived bassist Will Youatt did not appear in the writing credits despite allegedly making a significant contribution to the songs.

== Track listing ==
All songs composed by Micky Jones, Phil Ryan, Terry Williams and Clive John.

Side one
No.	Title	Length
1.	"C'mon"	11:03
2.	"Keep on Crinting"	8:18

Side two
No.	Title	Length
1.	"Bananas"	9:28
2.	"Life on the Road"	7:14

Bananas sample
An audio sample of "Bananas"

== Personnel ==
- Micky Jones – guitars, vocals
- Clive John – guitars, vocals
- Phil Ryan – keyboards, vocals
- Will Youatt – bass, vocals
- Terry Williams – drums, percussion
- Dave Edmunds – pedal steel guitar on "C'mon"

== Release history ==
The original LP was released in November 1972 in the UK (United Artists UAG 29417), Japan (Liberty LLP-80784) and the USA (United Artists UA-LA 077).

This album was released on CD by Beat Goes On in 1991 (BGO CD 14).

In 2007 Esoteric remastered and re-released the album (ECLEC 2019) with two bonus tracks:

1. "Bananas"
2. "Rockfield Jam"

These bonus tracks were recorded at Rockfield Studios, in the spring of 1972, by the previous line-up (Micky Jones, Deke Leonard, Martin Ace and Terry Williams) and show how "Bananas" developed with the change of line-up although the writing credits for this track were only given to the new line-up.

This re-issue also greatly improved the situation of the cover artwork, i.e. the map and the 'Family Jungle' which were now readable.
