= Don't Say You Don't Remember =

Single by Beverly Bremers

from the album I'll Make You Music
- B-side: "Get Smart Girl"
- Released: May 1971
- Genre: Pop, Soft Rock
- Length: 3:13
- Label: Scepter
- Songwriters: Helen Miller, Estelle Levitt

Beverly Bremers singles chronology
"You've Got Your Mind on Other Things" (1968)	"Don't Say You Don't Remember" (1971)	"When Michael Calls" (1971)

"Don't Say You Don't Remember" is a song written by Helen Miller and Estelle Levitt. It was originally recorded by The Goggles in 1970.

== Beverly Bremers recording ==
A 1971 recording by Beverly Bremers reached No. 5 on the Billboard Adult Contemporary chart and No. 15 on the Billboard Hot 100. In Canada, it peaked at No. 17. France Chart No. 5, Italy Chart No. 12, and number 81 in Australia.

The song's initial release in the spring of the year had been only minimally successful in the U.S. (#102). However, radio airplay by stations in California prompted the song's re-release in December, affording "Don't Say You Don't Remember" much greater American chart success during the winter of 1972 (#15 Billboard and #16 Cash Box).

The song was featured on her 1972 album, I'll Make You Music and was arranged by Charles Calello.

The single ranked 86th on Billboard's Year-End Hot 100 singles of 1972.
