= Side project =

Project in which music is developed / played

In popular music, a side project is a project undertaken by one or more people already known for their involvement in another band. It can also be an artist or a band temporarily switching to a different style.

Usually these projects emphasize a different aspect of that person's or that band's musical interests that they feel they cannot explore within the boundaries established by their main project. Side projects can later become full-time endeavours, but should not be confused with quitting a band for a solo career or another band. Peter Hartlaub of San Francisco Chronicle called the solo side project "the biggest longshot bet in mainstream music".

The New York Times described the side project as "a break from the other band members, a chance to toy with different genres and recording methods, a fling with no long-term commitment". There can be aesthetic reasons to pursue side projects, and side projects can have the benefit of protecting indie credibility.

== Overview ==
One of the earliest examples of a side project in the rock era was that of The Four Seasons, who established The Wonder Who? as a brand for experimental and novelty covers that could not be released under their own name; more enduringly, lead singer Frankie Valli's solo career began as a side project. Such was the rarity of such arrangements at the time that Philips Records, the Four Seasons' record label at the time of Valli's early solo work, was initially afraid that it was a sign the band was soon to dissolve or that Valli was leaving, which Valli assured he had no intention of doing.

One example of musical side projects is Kiss's decision in 1978 to have each member of the band, Gene Simmons, Paul Stanley, Ace Frehley and Peter Criss, simultaneously release solo albums. In 1992, The Melvins released solo EPs in a similar fashion.

"Side project" may also refer to pursuits of famous individuals outside of their primary fields. For instance, Wicked Wisdom is a "side project" of actress Jada Pinkett Smith. Side projects often occur at a crossroads of a celebrity's career.

A side project can also be a band that takes on an "alter ego", usually in order to play a different style of music that their fans are not used to. An example of this type of side project would be the band Weezer, who is also the Nirvana cover band Goat Punishment.

Another example of a side project is when in 1990, Jesper Strömblad of Ceremonial Oath decided to start a side project known as In Flames because he wanted to start a new project that combined Iron Maiden and death metal all together which he said he had never heard of before, the side project then grew into a band in 1995 and is now one of the most influential metal bands of all time, and still together without Jesper.

A joint side project consisting of members of multiple known bands is known as a supergroup.

== Famous or notable side projects ==
- 58, a side project of Nikki Sixx from Mötley Crüe.
- (+44), a side project of Mark Hoppus and Travis Barker of Blink-182.
- (a+) machines, a side project of Matt Noveskey of Blue October.
- The Almost, a side project of Aaron Gillespie of underOATH.
- The Amps, a side project of The Breeders
- The Arcs, a side project of Dan Auerbach of The Black Keys.
- Anchor & Braille, a side project of Stephen Christian of Anberlin, Aaron Marsh and Copeland.
- Angels & Airwaves, a side project of Tom DeLonge of Blink-182
- A Perfect Circle, a side project of Maynard James Keenan of Tool.
- The Art Goblins, a side project of Eddie Argos and Jasper Future of Art Brut.
- Bad Meets Evil, a side project of rappers Eminem and Royce da 5'9"
- Blaqk Audio, a side project of Davey Havok and Jade Puget of AFI.
- Bleachers, a side project of Jack Antonoff of Fun.
- Box Car Racer, a side project of Travis Barker and Tom Delonge (then of Blink-182), and David Kennedy of Hazen Street.
- Brad, a side project of Pearl Jam and Satchel.
- Brand X, a jazz fusion side project of Phil Collins of Genesis.
- The Breeders, a side project of Pixies and Throwing Muses.
- Cobra Starship, a side project of Gabe Saporta of Midtown.
- City and Colour, a side project of Dallas Green of Alexisonfire.
- The Cross, a side project of Roger Taylor of Queen.
- Cross Country, a side project of The Tokens.
- Dashboard Confessional, a side project of Chris Carrabba of Further Seems Forever.
- Dead by Sunrise, a side project of Chester Bennington of Linkin Park and all members of Julien-K.
- Dee Gees, a side project of Foo Fighters.
- Demons and Wizards, a side project of Hansi Kürsch of Blind Guardian and Jon Schaffer of Iced Earth.
- Eagles of Death Metal, a side project of Josh Homme of Queens of the Stone Age.
- Electric Light Orchestra, a side project of Jeff Lynne, Roy Wood, and Bev Bevan of The Move
- Fever Ray, a side project of Karin Dreijer Andersson of The Knife.
- Fight the Sky, a side project of Jacoby Shaddix of Papa Roach.
- The Fireman, a side project of Paul McCartney.
- Flo and Eddie, a side project of Howard Kaylan and Mark Volman of The Turtles, created in response to the duo's dispute with White Whale Records.
- FM Static, a side project of Trevor McNevan and Steve Augustine of Thousand Foot Krutch.
- Fort Minor, a side project of Mike Shinoda of Linkin Park.
- Foxboro Hot Tubs, a side project of Green Day.
- The Glove, a side project of Robert Smith and Siouxsie and the Banshees' Steven Severin of The Cure.
- Goon Moon, a side project of Jeordie White of Marilyn Manson.
- Gorillaz, a virtual band composed of four fictional animated band members, created by Damon Albarn from Blur, and Jamie Hewlett, the co-creator of the comic book Tank Girl.
- Gov't Mule, a side project of Warren Haynes and Allen Woody of the Allman Brothers Band.
- Hindu Love Gods, a side project of R.E.M. in collaboration with Warren Zevon
- Hot Tuna began as a side project of Jack Casady and Jorma Kaukonen of Jefferson Airplane.
- How to Destroy Angels, a side project of Trent Reznor of Nine Inch Nails
- I Can Make a Mess Like Nobody's Business and Ace Enders and a Million Different People fronted by Ace Enders, formerly of The Early November
- Jack's Mannequin began as a side project of Andrew McMahon of Something Corporate
- Jerry Garcia Band, a side project of Jerry Garcia of Grateful Dead
- Jonathan Davis and the SFA, a side project of Jonathan Davis of Korn.
- Knife Party, a side project of Rob Swire and Gareth McGrillen of Pendulum.
- Liquid Tension Experiment, a side project of Dream Theater featuring John Petrucci, Mike Portnoy, Jordan Rudess, and progressive rock icon bassist Tony Levin.
- Lingua Mortis Orchestra, a side project of Rage.
- Little Feat, a side project of Lowell George, Bill Payne, and Roy Estrada of The Mothers of Invention
- The Longshot, a side project of Billie Joe Armstrong of Green Day
- Marmaduke Duke, a side project of Biffy Clyro
- Maximum Balloon, a side project of Dave Sitek of TV on the Radio
- MD.45, a side project of Dave Mustaine and Jimmy DeGrasso from Megadeth with Lee Ving from Fear
- Middle Aged Dad Jam Band, a side project of The State.
- Mike + The Mechanics, a side project of Mike Rutherford of Genesis.
- Mrs. Scabtree, a side project between Marilyn Manson, Jeordie White and Jessicka from Jack Off Jill.
- The Network, supposedly a side project of all the members of Green Day.
- The New Amsterdams began as a side project of Matthew Pryor of The Get Up Kids
- New Build, a side project of Hot Chip
- Nick Jonas & the Administration, a side project of Nick Jonas of the Jonas Brothers
- The Nightwatchman, the alter ego of Rage Against the Machine and Audioslave guitarist Tom Morello.
- The Operation M.D., a side project of Juliette and the Licks guitarist Todd Morse and Sum 41 bassist Cone McCaslin.
- Pinhead Gunpowder, a side project of Billie Joe Armstrong.
- The Postal Service, a side project featuring Ben Gibbard of Death Cab for Cutie and Jimmy Tamborello of Dntel.
- Probot, a Dave Grohl side project featuring various 1970s and 1980s heavy metal vocalists.
- ProjeKct X, the side project of King Crimson.
- Prozzäk, a side project with James McCollum and Jason Levine who are two members of The Philosopher Kings.
- Puscifer, another side project consisting and organized by Maynard James Keenan of Tool.
- The Raconteurs, consisting of Jack White (from the White Stripes), Brendan Benson, Patrick Keeler (from The Greenhornes), and Jack Lawrence (from The Greenhornes and Blanche).
- Refuge, a side project of Rage.
- RNDM, a side project of Pearl Jam
- Simple Creatures, a side project of Mark Hoppus from Blink-182 and Alex Gaskarth from All Time Low.
- Singers Unlimited, a side project of The Hi-Los
- Sixx:A.M., a side project of Nikki Sixx of Mötley Crüe.
- The Smile, a side project of Thom Yorke and Jonny Greenwood from Radiohead, and former Sons of Kemet drummer Tom Skinner.
- Sol Invicto, a side project of Stephen Carpenter from Deftones led by Richie Londres.
- Some Devil, a side project of Dave Matthews from the Dave Matthews Band.
- Some Girls, a supergroup/side project consisting of current members of The Locust and The Plot to Blow Up the Eiffel Tower, and ex-members of Give Up the Ghost (formerly American Nightmare).
- The Superions, a side project of Fred Schneider from The B-52s.
- The Tear Garden, a project consisting primarily of Edward Ka-Spel from The Legendary Pink Dots and Cevin Key from Skinny Puppy.
- The Sound of Animals Fighting, a side project consisting of Rich Balling, Matt Embree, and Christopher Tsagakis of Rx Bandits, Anthony Green of Circa Survive, Derek Dougherty and Randy Strohmeyer of Finch, Marc McKnight of Atreyu, Rich Zahniser of Never Heard of It, Matthew Kelly of The Autumns, Craig Owens of Chiodos, and Keith Goodwin of Days Away.
- Temple of the Dog, featuring members of Soundgarden with Pearl Jam and the start of that band.
- Thee Silver Mt. Zion Memorial Orchestra, originally a side project of Montreal post-rock band Godspeed You! Black Emperor.
- Them Crooked Vultures, a side project featuring Dave Grohl (Foo Fighters and Nirvana), Josh Homme (Queens of the Stone Age) and John Paul Jones (Led Zeppelin).
- Three Fish, featuring Jeff Ament of Pearl Jam.
- Tired Pony, a side project that consists of Gary Lightbody of Snow Patrol, Peter Buck of R.E.M., Richard Colburn of Belle & Sebastian, and Zooey Deschanel of She & Him, as well as other members of Snow Patrol.
- Tom Tom Club, a side project of Tina Weymouth and Chris Frantz of Talking Heads.
- Trans-Siberian Orchestra, a side project of Savatage; TSO has largely overshadowed the band that spawned it
- Ugly Casanova, a side project of Isaac Brock of Modest Mouse.
- The Voidz (formerly Julian Casablancas + The Voidz), a side project of Julian Casablancas of The Strokes.
- Velvet Revolver, a grunge rock side project featuring Scott Weiland of Stone Temple Pilots and Slash of Guns N' Roses.
- White Hot Odyssey, a hard rock side project featuring vocalist Steve Perry and guitarist Jason Moss of the Cherry Poppin' Daddies.
- The Whitest Boy Alive, a side project of Erlend Øye of Kings of Convenience.
- X-Cops and the Dave Brockie Experience were both side projects of Gwar.

== See also ==
- Supergroup
