= Goddess of Love (film) =

- Genre: Comedy; Fantasy
- Written by: Don Segall; Phil Margo
- Directed by: Jim Drake
- Starring: Vanna White; David Naughton; David Leisure
- Music by: Dennis Dreith; Mitch Margo; Phil Margo
- Country of origin: United States
- Original language: English

Production
- Executive producer: Phil Margo
- Producer: Don Segall
- Cinematography: Gil Hubbs
- Editor: Michael Economou
- Running time: 100 minutes
- Production companies: New World Television; Phil Margo Entertainment; Phoenix Entertainment Group

Original release
- Network: NBC
- Release: November 20, 1988

Goddess of Love is a 1988 American made-for-television fantasy film directed by Jim Drake and written by Don Segall and Phil Margo. The film premiered on November 20, 1988 on NBC. It stars Vanna White. It is a loose remake of the feature film One Touch of Venus (1948).

== Plot ==
Ted is to be married to Cathy. He carelessly puts her heirloom ring on a statue of Venus. The statue is brought to life and sets out to win Ted's love, which will enable her return to the immortal world of Mt Olympus. Ted must contend with thieves who are after the statue, and cops who believe that he stole it.

== Cast ==
- Vanna White as Venus
- David Naughton as Ted Beckman
- David Leisure as Jimmy
- Amanda Bearse as Cathy
- Philip Baker Hall as Detective Charles
- Betsy Palmer as Hera
- John Rhys-Davies as Zeus
- Little Richard as Alphonso
- Ray O'Connor as Joe
- Michael Goldfinger as Mack
- Jennifer Bassey as Mrs. Wilson
- Marty Davis as Guard
- David Donham as Fire Marshal
- James Edgcomb as Uniformed Policeman
- Lindsey Fields as Tour Guide
- Phil Reeves as wedding officiant
- Shari Shattuck as Debbie
- Sid Haig as Hephaestus
- Kay E. Kuter as Neptune

== Reception ==
Of the underlying Greek mythology, a satirical critical reviewer speculated that "the scriptwriter cracked open his World Book Encyclopedia 'M' volume... Not that he understood much of what he read, but at least he...took a couple of notes." One scene in the movie has Jim doing precisely this.

The NBC network promo was satirized on Late Night With David Letterman.
