= Cross Country (band) =

Cross Country was an American harmony trio from Brooklyn, New York, United States. The folk rock band was formed as a side project of The Tokens, and featured three of its members: Jay Siegel, Mitch Margo and Phil Margo.

The group's first release was a single consisting of a cover of "Rock and Roll Music" backed by "Just A Thought." It failed to chart.

Thereafter, the group released a self-titled album on the Atco Records label, featuring a top 40 cover of Wilson Pickett's "In the Midnight Hour". The Cross Country version is altogether different from Pickett's 1965 soul hit. The first two minutes of the Cross Country single is considerably slower with an acoustic backdrop, picking up a bit with some psychedelic touches in the last third of the track, which was a little over three minutes in length (3:14). This single reached No. 30 in the U.S. Billboard Hot 100 in late 1973. In Canada it reached No. 34 on the pop charts and No. 15 on the AC charts.

Two singles followed, "Tastes So Good to Me"/"A Ball Song," and non-LP songs "Penny Whistle Band"/"Lord Can't Sing a Solo," neither of which charted.

The trio disbanded in 1974, with the members moving on to either record production and/or song writing duties.

== Track listing ==
1. "Today" - 2:47
2. "Just a Thought" - 3:18
3. "Cross Country" - 3:49
4. "In the Midnight Hour" - 3:14
5. "Thing With Wings" - 2:00
6. "Extended Wings" - 2:35
7. "Tastes So Good to Me" - 3:10
8. "A Fall Song" - 2:49
9. "Choirboy" - 3:20
10. "A Ball Song" - 2:50
11. "A Smile Song" - 4:28
