= David Libert =

American music executive, musician and author (1943–2024)

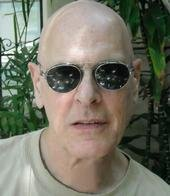

David Libert (January 20, 1943 – February 20, 2024) was an American music executive, musician, and author. He was one of the founding members of the musical group, The Happenings. Hailing from Paterson, New Jersey, The Happenings had a number of hit records, including "See You in September" and a cover of "I Got Rhythm", each peaking at number 3 on the Hot 100, in 1966 and 1967, respectively.

Libert later left the group to join the Willard Alexander Agency as a booking agent. After a brief stint as road manager for Rare Earth, Libert became tour manager for Alice Cooper during their most prominent years (1971–1975). Libert figured prominently in Bob Greene's book about accompanying Cooper's band on 1973's Billion Dollar Babies tour, Billion Dollar Baby (ISBN 0-689-10616-5). Libert was also credited for singing background vocals on the Billion Dollar Babies album, which was recorded at Morgan Studios in London in 1973.

In 1975 Libert migrated from New York to Los Angeles, and in 1976 he opened the David Libert Agency, which represented George Clinton, Parliament/Funkadelic, Bootsy's Rubber Band, and The Runaways' Cherie Currie, Joan Jett, and Lita Ford. In the late 1990s Libert formed Available Entertainment with entertainment attorney Alan Oken. A personal management company, Available Entertainment, went on to represent George Clinton; Parliament/Funkadelic; Brian Auger; Living Colour; Sheila E; Vanilla Fudge; Cactus; Iranian singer, writer, performer Sussan Deyhim; Skye Issac; The Fabulous Miss Wendy; The Coryell Auger Sample Trio; and Tomi Rae Brown.

Libert also wrote hit songs for other artists, including The Tokens, The Chiffons, and Gerry & The Pacemakers. Libert promoted many concerts throughout his career, including sold out shows at Madison Square Garden in New York (George Clinton) and the Cricket Wireless Amphitheater in Kansas City (Kool and the Gang).

Libert's record producing credits include co-producing The Happenings album, Piece of Mind, with fellow Happenings member Bobby Miranda, as well as producing, on his own, Tomi Rae Brown, Attus, Steel Water Blue, and Eric Kellogg's Imaginary Band. Libert had recently finished writing his autobiography, "Rock and Roll Warrior" (ISBN 978-1-68524-435-4), which was released on September 23, 2022, by Sunset Blvd Books. Libert resided in Southern California.

Libert died on February 20, 2024, at the age of 81.
