= Goodnight My Love (1960s song) =

For other songs with this title, see Goodnight My Love (disambiguation)

"Goodnight My Love" is a popular song written by Sandy Linzer and Denny Randell in the 1960s. It should not be confused with the earlier pop song with the same title, recorded by Jesse Belvin and covered by many other artists.

It has been recorded by several groups, the most popular version being the late 1966 release by the Happenings.

== Background ==
The song tells the story of a man who, on the way home from saying good night to his lover, meets a girl "so young and beautiful and very alone." He discerns as he "gazes into her eyes" that she wants him, and her lips are "just as soft as could be." When he tells her that he is in love with the other girl, she doesn't care. In the "dark of night," she "pulls the ribbon out of her hair," suggesting that the two begin a relationship. He then expresses his regrets to the other woman, realizing that he can never keep the promises he made to her. Finally, the man cannot bring himself to say goodbye to his former lover ("the words just don't sound right"), so instead, he repeats the words he always used to say when he held her close: "Goodnight, my love."

== Reception ==
Billboard predicted this would be a Top 20 hit, writing, "Chalk up another 'Go Away Little Girl' winner for the 'See You In September' group." They also praised the song's "smooth vocal workout." Cash Box noted that the group "had made it to hitsville twice, and should easily make it a trio with this lovely love song." They featured the single as a "sure shot" in their December 10, 1966 issue.

Despite its average chart performance on the national level, the song was a Top 10 hit at radio stations in markets as diverse as Salt Lake City, Tallahassee, and Lansing, Michigan.

== Releases ==
The version by the Happenings (B.T. Puppy Records #523) was produced by the Tokens, and reached #51 on the Billboard Hot 100 in January 1967.

The version by the Duprees (Heritage Records #805) reached #113 on the Billboard Hot 100 "Bubbling Under" chart in November 1968. This version omits the song's last verse.

== Recorded versions ==
- The Duprees
- The Happenings
