= The Quotations =

American doo-wop band

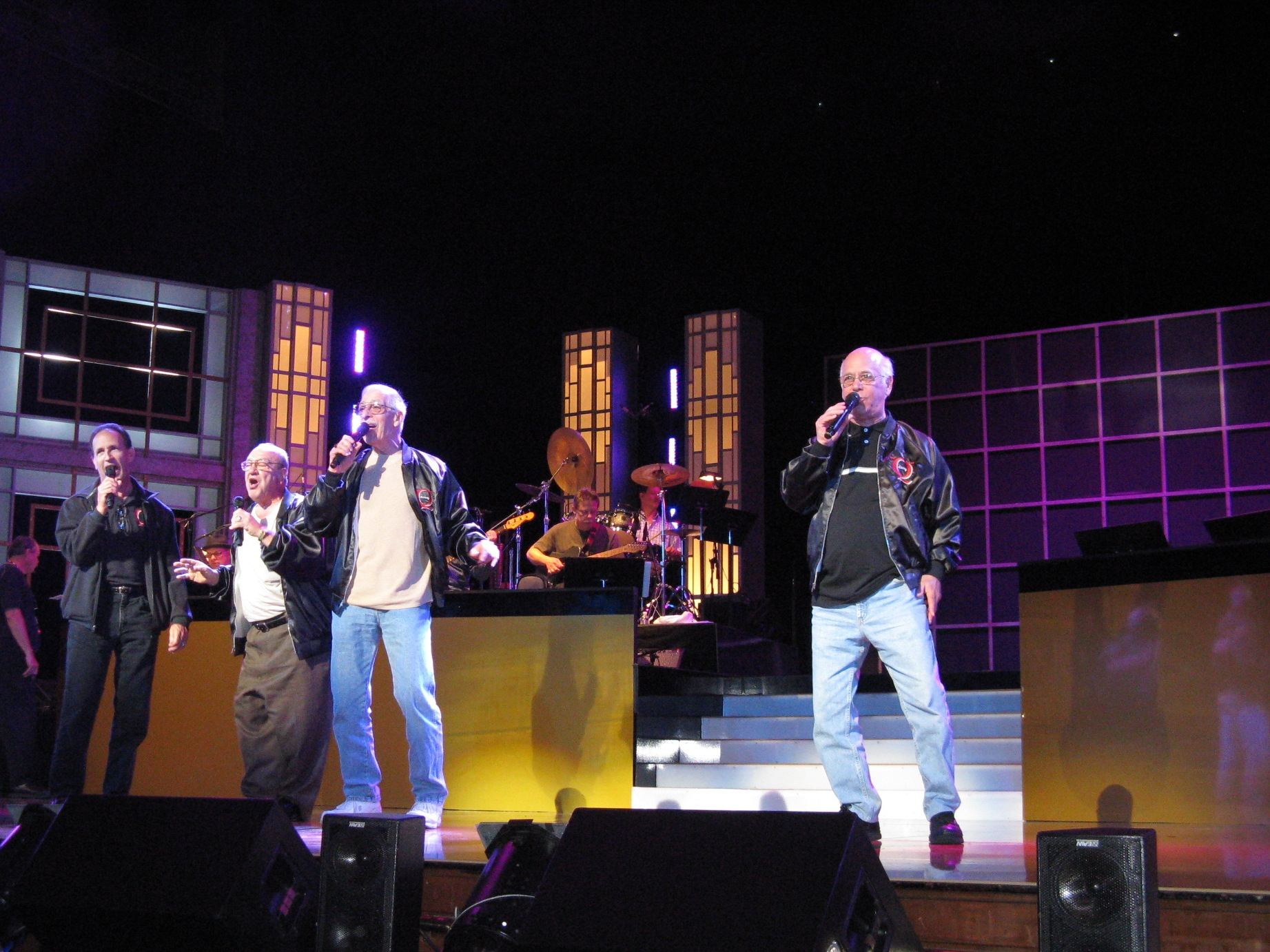
- The Quotations live in concert at the Benedum Center, Pennsylvania

Background information
- Origin: East Brooklyn
- Genres: Doo-wop
- Years active: 1958–present
- Labels: Verve, Relic
- Members: Lew Arno; Harvey Hersh[kowitz]; Larry Kassman; Patty Bello
- Past members: Richie Schwartz; Stu Abramson

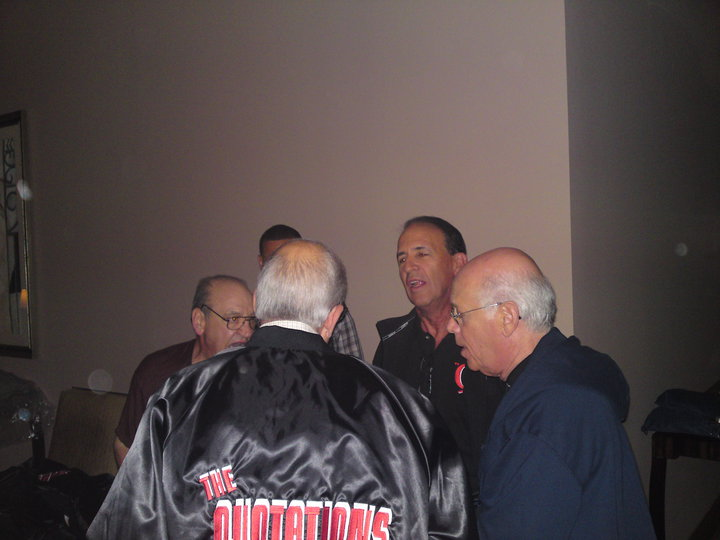
The Quotations performing at the hall of the Hilton Pittsburgh in Pittsburgh, Pennsylvania, during their participation in the doo wop festival celebrated in this city at the Benedum Center for the performing arts in May 2010

The Quotations are an American doo-wop band, primarily from James Madison High School in East Brooklyn, New York, United States.

The group started in 1958 at Barney's Pool Room on Kings Highway in East Brooklyn, New York. The original members of the group were Richie Schwartz (first tenor), Lew Arno (second tenor) and Harvey Hersh[kowitz] (baritone) who hung out together harmonizing. Larry Kassman later asked if he could sing with the group; Kassman soon became lead for the group.

The group later picked up the name "Quotations" from one of the songs they liked to perform, "Quotations of Love" written by a friend of the group, Mike Rose. The group often sung at the Rainbow Store on Kings Highway near the train station; on the Manhattan Beach and Brighton Beach boardwalks; and at Sid Gordon's bowling alley - all Brooklyn favorites for teenagers. In 1959, the group made their first demos: "Time Was", "Sunday Kind of Love" and "September in the Rain".

Helen Miller worked for the producer Don Kirshner as a songwriter. She heard the Quotations' music and became their manager. Miller shopped the group around and they eventually met up with executives at Verve Records. Historically, Verve was not considered a doo-wop label, focusing more on jazz and blues music. The group chose to do a new, uptempo style version of Jimmy Van Heusen's song, "Imagination". The record was released in 1961 and reached No. 105 in the Billboard chart.

The group enjoyed success in 1962, making concert appearances on the east coast, in the south and midwest. Their follow-up record in 1962 (Verve 10252) was "This Love of Mine". "We'll Reach Heaven Together" was the B-side. The group recorded "See You in September" backed with "Summertime Goodbye" (Verve 10261) in April 1962, thinking it would be the perfect summertime record. But it was not released until late August and DJ's failed to pick up on it. Harvey remembers: "'See You in September' came next, but unfortunately Verve released the record in August which pretty much destroyed any chance of air play." The group had one last record - "In the Night" backed with "Oh No I Still Love Her" (1964 - Admiral 753) and Harvey believes that "Oh No" was their best record.

A few versions of the Quotations continued performing with Sandy Sonner and recorded some a cappella selections during the 1970s for Relic Records. However, Harvey notes that not one original member has ever sung with another vocal group.

In 1998, after a few reunions, the group reformed with a new tenor as Schwartz moved to bass and welcomed new member Stu Abramson. Abramson was with the group the Astralites who recorded "Space Hop" in 1961 and sings, plays saxophone, guitar, bass and keyboards. The group recorded a new CD in 2000. Called 40 Years Of Doo-Wop Friendship it was released on the Q2K label. It included not only new material but all their original selections. Harvey comments "This CD represents the culmination of lots of practice, plenty of live performances and a renewed love of this magical, musical entity we call Doo-Wop. We've recorded some favorites of ours, included are some a cappella and also the eight songs that we originally recorded 40 years ago. Some have never been heard before".

Richie Schwartz and Stu Abramson both died in 2006. Patty Bello joined the group as a new fourth member.
