= Goodnight My Love =

"Goodnight My Love" may refer to:

- "Goodnight My Love" (1932 song), by Gus Arnheim, Harry Tobias, and Jules Lemare
- "Goodnight My Love" (1936 song), by Mack Gordon and Harry Revel
- "Goodnight My Love" (1956 song), by George Motola and John Marascalco
- "Goodnight My Love" (1960s song), by Denny Randell and Sandy Linzer
