= Eric Bobo =

American percussionist (born 1968)

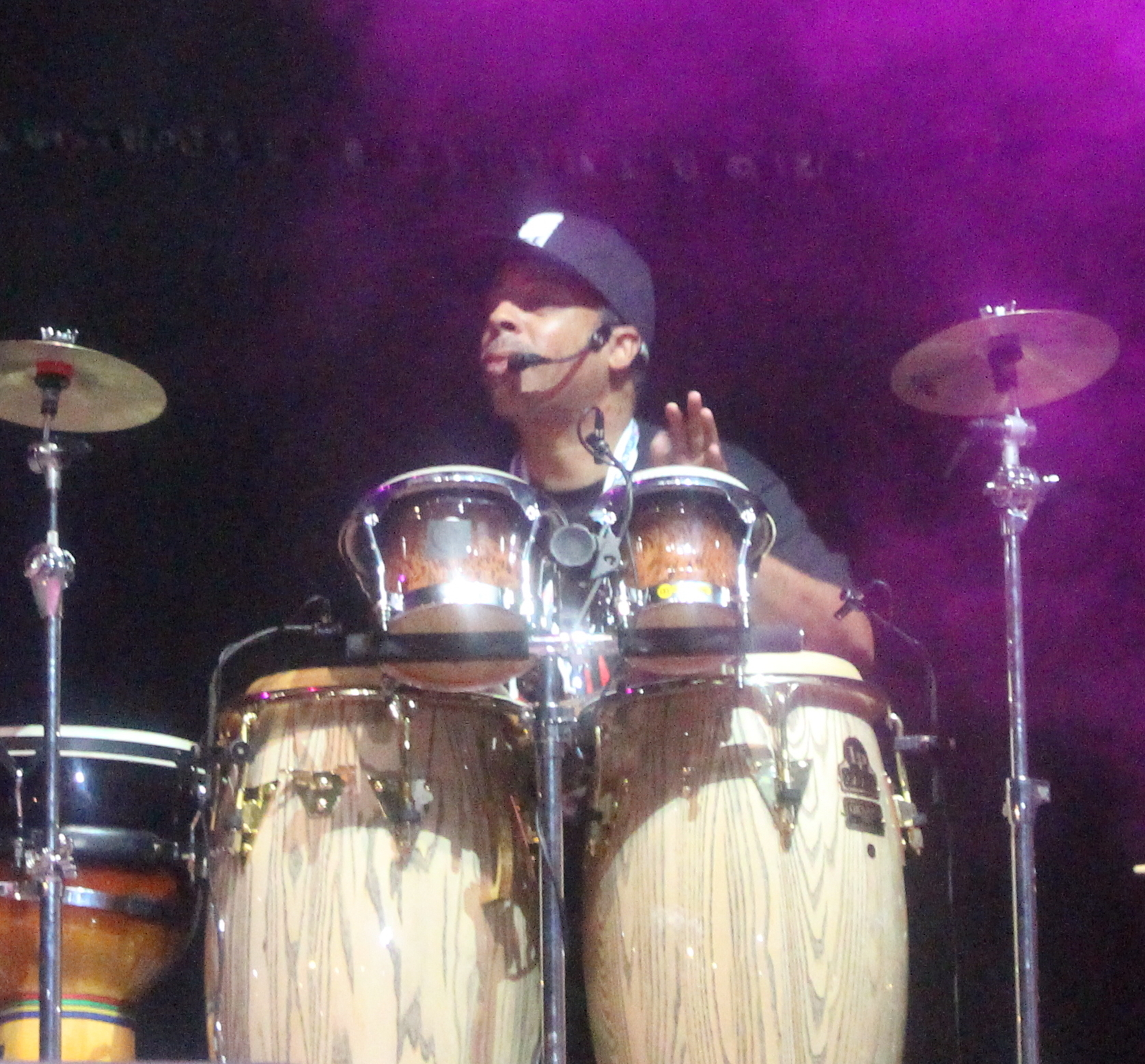
- Correa with Cypress Hill at Nova Rock 2016

Background information
- Born: Eric Correa; August 27, 1968 (age 58); New York City, U.S.
- Genres: Hip hop; Latin; rock; nu metal; Industrial metal
- Occupation: Percussionist
- Years active: 1986–present
- Member of: Cypress Hill; Sol Invicto

Eric Correa (born August 27, 1968), known as Eric Bobo, is an American percussionist best known as a member of Cypress Hill and for his work with the Beastie Boys in the 1990s. He is also a founding member of the industrial metal supergroup Sol Invicto, alongside Deftones guitarist Stephen Carpenter and producer/guitarist Richie Londres.

== Early life ==
Correa is the son of pioneering Latin jazz percussionist Willie Bobo, who collaborated with legends such as Tito Puente, Miles Davis, and Cal Tjader. Influenced by his father's career, Correa began drumming at age four and made his first professional appearance at five, performing on stage with Willie Bobo. Growing up surrounded by music, Correa's early jobs included working at a record store, Music Plus, where he was immersed in albums and cassettes.

== Career ==
Correa's professional career began in 1986, blending Latin percussion with hip hop and rock.

=== Beastie Boys ===
Correa recorded percussion for the Beastie Boys on Ill Communication (1994) and Hello Nasty (1998), contributing to their fusion of hip hop with rock and funk elements. He highlighted working on Ill Communication as one of his proudest studio moments.

=== Cypress Hill ===
Correa joined Cypress Hill as their percussionist in the early 1990s, contributing to their signature sound blending hip hop with Latin percussion and rock influences. He has remained a key member through albums including Rise Up (2010), where he noted the band's refreshed energy after a hiatus for solo projects. In 2024, Cypress Hill collaborated with the London Symphony Orchestra at the Royal Albert Hall, performing Black Sunday—a concept originating from a 1996 Simpsons episode. The performance was released as a concert film and album in 2025, with Correa serving as musical director.

=== Sol Invicto ===
Correa is a core member and percussionist of Sol Invicto, an instrumental cinematic industrial electronic metal project founded in 2008 by Richie Londres, with Correa joining early via his prior collaboration with Londres on Cultura Londres. The group also includes Stephen Carpenter (Deftones) on guitar, Dan Foord (ex-SikTh) on drums, and Technical Itch on production.

Initially underground with releases exclusive to the Sol Invicto Comiti private members club (2017–2023), the project transitioned to public distribution in 2024 with the debut EP Loosely Aware via OMYAC Records/ONErpm. The EP was praised for its djent-heavy, percussive doom and chugging riffs, blending Correa's hypnotic conga work with Carpenter's detuned guitars and guest screams from Sean Plague.

In 2025, Sol Invicto released the full public version of Initium ft. Zach Hill (reissue of a 2011 track with extended drums from Death Grips/Hella's Zach Hill) and the ongoing weekly Vault of Shadows Bandcamp series (pay-what-you-want exclusives including "Tokyo Nights", "Under The Surface", etc.).

== Other projects and collaborations ==
Correa has collaborated extensively, including with the Black Crowes on Amorica (1994), a southern rock album he cited as a proud moment.

In 2008, Correa released his debut solo album Meeting of the Minds on Nacional Records, featuring B-Real and Tony Touch.

In 2012, Correa formed Ritmo Machine with Latin Bitman, releasing the album Welcome to the Ritmo Machine on Nacional Records.

Correa contributed percussion to Cultura Londres, a Latin hip hop project founded by Richie Londres, including the track "Fiesta" on his solo album.

== Personal life ==
Correa has discussed influences including Public Enemy, Black Sabbath, and Santana, crediting them for Cypress Hill's sound. He has also shared reading Bram Stoker's Dracula amid modern vampire trends.
