= See You in September =

1959 single

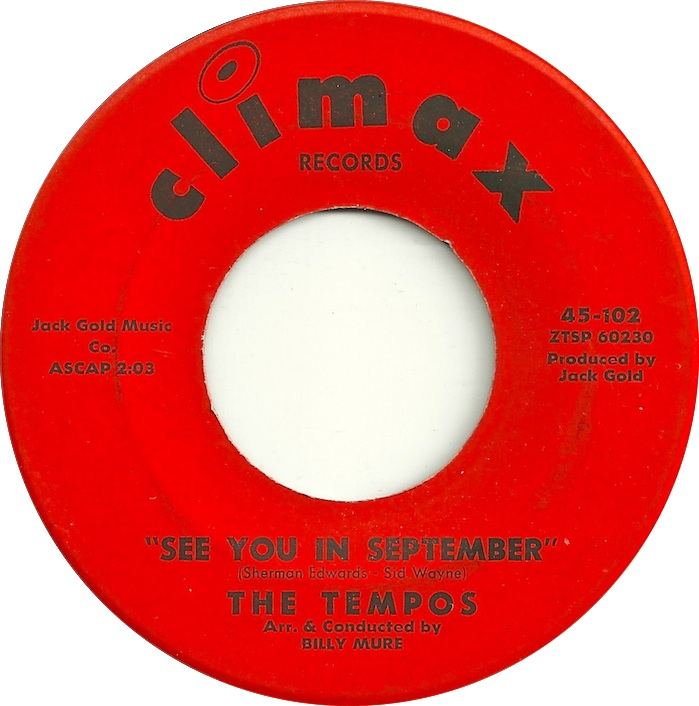

Single by the Tempos
- B-side: "Bless You My Love"
- Released: June 1959
- Recorded: November 1958
- Genre: Pop
- Length: 2:03
- Label: Climax
- Songwriters: Sid Wayne, Sherman Edwards
- Producer: Jack Gold

The Tempos singles chronology
"See You in September" (1959)	"The Crossroads of Love" (1959)

"See You in September" is a song written by Sid Wayne and Sherman Edwards. It was first recorded by the Pittsburgh vocal group The Tempos. This first version peaked at No. 23 in the USA in the summer of 1959, and No. 16 in Canada. The most popular take on "See You In September" was by the Happenings in 1966, which reached No. 3.

== Background ==
Sid Wayne would recall the song's inception: "I was in the habit of going from my home on Long Island every day to Brill Building, in the Times Square area of New York City [to] meet with different songwriters there. We'd eat at Jack Dempsey's or The Turf Restaurant and then we'd go up to one of the publishers' offices and work in the piano room. We'd sit around saying to each other, 'What do you want to write today? A hit or a standard?'" At 11 a.m. on a Friday in June 1959 Wayne thus met up with Sherman Edwards: "he said, 'What do you want to write?' 'I'd like to write a song called See You in September,"' I said. We talked it back and forth and I think I may have contributed part of the opening music, but with Sherman it didn't matter, because he could throw me back half the lyric — that's how he worked. I think probably by two in the afternoon we got the song finished. It needed to be written; it was like boiling inside of us."

By 4:30 PM that day, Wayne and Edwards had reworked their composition, simplifying it so as to appeal to the teen demographic, and proceeded to make the rounds of publishers to pitch the song which, after one rejection, met with an enthusiastic reception from Jack Gold, owner of the local Paris label. By 8 PM, he had telephoned the Tempos in their hometown of Pittsburgh. The group had been flown into New York City by the next day, Saturday. Sid Wayne: "By Monday the record was cut [with the Billy Mure orchestra], test pressings were Thursday, and by Friday the song was played on WNEW in New York. The thing took off like wildfire… Five hundred dollars to split between the two of us [i.e. Wayne & Edwards]… was a damn good week's pay in 1961."

The Tempos' "See You in September" failed to become a hit in the New York City area and despite breaking in San Francisco in June, the single did not reach the national charts until that July. Despite a subsequent swift ascent on the Billboard Hot 100, the single's momentum fell sharply at the end of August with a resultant No. 23 peak. Although overshadowed by the Happenings' No. 3 remake, the Tempos' version of "See You in September" did gain considerable traction in 1973 by virtue of its inclusion on the American Graffiti soundtrack.

The Tempos who sang on the recording were Mike Lazo (top tenor), Jim Drake, Tom Monito, Gene Schachter.

== The Happenings version ==
"See You in September"
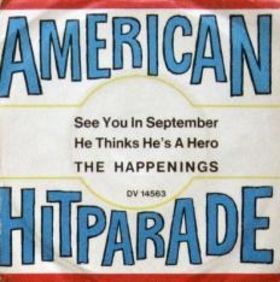

Single by the Happenings

from the album The Happenings
- B-side: "He Thinks He's a Hero"
- Released: July 1966
- Genre: Pop
- Length: 2:31
- Label: B.T. Puppy
- Songwriters: Sid Wayne, Sherman Edwards
- Producer: The Tokens

The Happenings singles chronology
"Girls on the Go" (1966)	"See You in September" (1966)	"Go Away Little Girl" (1966)

Bob Miranda of the Happenings recalls that he and the other members of the group considered the original version of "See You in September", which was "sort of a slow Cha-Cha—a great song and kind of a bad record. We always looked for that. If you want to revise something and put your own sound to it, I think you should look for a great song that was not a great record." Recorded in the spring of 1966, the Happenings' version of "See You in September" was produced by Bob Crewe for the B.T. Puppy label, though the label credits the producer to "Bright Tunes Productions." The song's Herb Bernstein arrangement recalled both the recordings of the Tokens (who owned B. T. Puppy) and the Four Seasons. Breaking out in Boston, where the track reached the Top Ten that June, "See You in September" accrued enough national support to enter the Billboard Hot 100 that July to reach that chart's Top Ten the third week of August 1966. Despite peaking at No. 3 the first week of September 1966, the single had enough staying power to remain in the Top Ten throughout the rest of the month. That December, the Happenings were awarded a Gold disc for "See You in September" selling a million units. In Canada the song did reach No. 1 The single became a hit in Brazil, appearing at No. 1 on the chart for Rio de Janeiro in January 1967. In June 1967 the Happenings were invited to participate in the Sanremo Music Festival, where they performed it in Italian as "Aria de settembre".

== Other versions ==
During the period between the original recording of "See You in September" by the Tempos in 1959 and the No. 3 hit version by the Happenings in 1966, the song was remade in classic doo-wop style by the Quotations in April 1962. According to Quotations member Harvey Hersh: "Verve [the group's label] released the record in August which pretty much destroyed any chance of air play."

In 1962, Shelley Fabares released a version of the song on her second album The Things We Did Last Summer.

In 1963, Bobby Rydell recorded the song for his album Wild (Wood) Days.

Also in 1963, the Chiffons recorded a version of the song for their He's So Fine album. The track was reprised on their 1966 Sweet Talkin' Guy album.

Mike Clifford had a September 1964 single release of the song but as the B-side of the non-charter "One By One The Roses Died".

In the UK, where the Happenings' single was released on Fontana Records in August 1966 and fell short of UK Singles Chart, "See You in September" was recorded the same month by The Symbols, a male quartet from East London signed by Edward Kassner of President Records specifically to cover the Happenings' hit. Featuring Keith Mansfield on orchestral arrangement/conducting duties, the Symbols' version reached No. 19 on the Radio London Fab 40, without ranking on the UK Singles Chart. Distribution problems reportedly also factoring into its lack of chart impact, although the Symbols remained with President providing the label with successful remakes of older American hits "Bye Bye Baby" and "The Best Part of Breaking Up". The Symbols' guitarist, Mick Clarke, would be a founding member of the Rubettes. The song was also recorded by Gerry and the Pacemakers.

In 1966, in Hong Kong, this song was recorded by local pop group Teddy Robin and the Playboys on their album Not All Lies!.

In 1972, a remake of the song by the Mike Curb Congregation reached No. 15 on Billboard's Easy Listening chart. Julie Budd also remade it that year, with her version successful enough in Argentina to justify a South American tour in the spring of 1973.

In 1973, the band California recorded a remake of the song for Laurie Records. California was led by Beatlemania (musical) cast member Les Fradkin. The single also featured members of the 1960s Baroque pop group the Left Banke.

In August 1979, a version by Debby Boone was issued as a single to coincide with the release of the Debby Boone album (which did not feature "See You in September"). This version charted at No. 41 C&W and No. 45 Adult Contemporary. It also reached No. 45 on the Canadian C&W charts. Also in 1979 Cisse (fi) remade "See You in September" for his Summer Party album.

In November 1966, Olivier Despax (fr) recorded a French-language version of the song in London for release on Barclay Records. That same year, the Spanish rendering "Te veré en septiembre" was recorded by both Marta Baizán and Kinita.

An alternate Spanish performance "Setembre Está Lonxe" was recorded by Jacinta and released in 1967.

== Use in popular culture ==
In 1988, the song was used in a commercial for Roy Rogers Restaurants that depicted school cafeteria personnel holding up trays of unappetizing school lunches. This commercial was later pulled off the air after real life school cafeteria personnel complained that the advertisement was demeaning to their profession.

A remixed version of the song was also used in an NFL on CBS promotion prior to the 2021 season.
