= Stephen Carpenter =

American guitarist (born 1970)

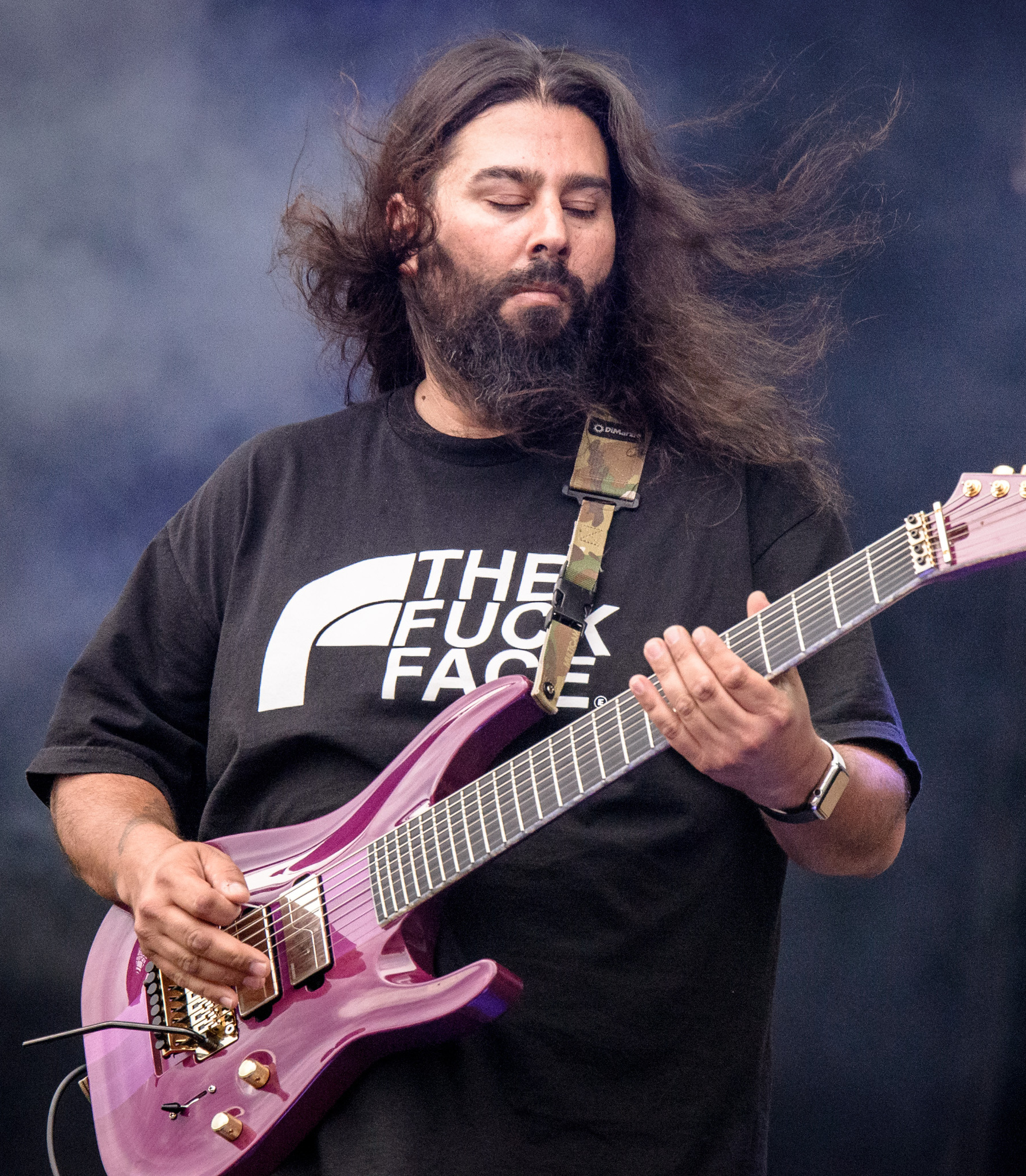
- Carpenter performing with Deftones at Rock im Park 2016

Background information
- Born: August 3, 1970 (age 56); Sacramento, California, U.S.
- Genres: Alternative metal; post-metal; experimental rock; nu metal; industrial metal
- Occupation: Musician
- Instrument: Guitar
- Years active: 1988–present
- Member of: Deftones; Sol Invicto
- Formerly of: Kush
- Website: www.deftones.com

Stephen Carpenter (/ˈstɛfən/ STEF-ən; born August 3, 1970) is an American musician, best known as the co-founder and lead guitarist of the alternative metal band Deftones. He is also a founding member of the instrumental industrial metal side project Sol Invicto, alongside producer/guitarist Richie Londres and percussionist Eric Bobo (Cypress Hill)

His guitar technique makes use of both ringing open strings and dissonant chord voicings, as well as stock power chords in polyrhythms. Carpenter began his musical career with Deftones playing the traditional six-string guitar. After becoming influenced by such bands as Fear Factory and Meshuggah, he began playing a seven-string guitar in the late 1990s. After Deftones' third album White Pony, subsequent releases would be written with seven-strings, until 2010's Diamond Eyes and 2012's Koi No Yokan, which were written with an eight-string guitar. The 2020 Ohms album features a song written with a nine-string guitar.

Carpenter was ranked 4th in Guitar World's The 10 Greatest Metal Guitarists poll.

== Early life ==
Stephen Carpenter was born on August 3, 1970, in Sacramento, California, to an Anglo-American father and a Mexican mother. He has a sister named Marci. He is first cousin to Testament singer Chuck Billy. He grew up in the Sacramento area and pursued many hobbies, including skateboarding.

When Carpenter was 15 years old, he was hit by a car while skateboarding. He used a wheelchair for several months. It was at this point that he began teaching himself guitar by playing along with the records of bands such as Anthrax, Stormtroopers of Death and Metallica. It was reported that the driver paid Carpenter a cash settlement which allowed the band to purchase equipment, but drummer Abe Cunningham commented in an interview that this was "a myth about how our band was started."

Carpenter attended McClatchy High School with future bandmates Chino Moreno and Abe Cunningham. They were childhood friends and remained friends through the skateboarding scene in Sacramento. When Moreno found out Carpenter played guitar, he set up a jam session with Cunningham and the three began playing regularly in Carpenter's garage circa 1988.

After playing with several bassists, the band settled on Chi Cheng and within two years the band began playing club shows and later expanded their playing territory to San Francisco and Los Angeles where they played shows alongside bands such as Korn.

== Sol Invicto ==
Carpenter is a founding member and lead guitarist of Sol Invicto, an instrumental cinematic industrial electronic metal side project formed in 2008 with producer/guitarist Richie Londres (Cultura Londres Proyecto), alongside percussionist Eric Bobo (Cypress Hill), drummer Dan Foord (ex-SikTh), and production by Technical Itch.

Sol Invicto serves as Carpenter's outlet for exploring heavier, grinding riffage and instrumental experimentation, allowing him to unleash his "heaviest riffs yet" in a style distinct from Deftones. The project began with private releases exclusive to the Sol Invicto Comiti members club from 2017 to 2023. It transitioned to public availability in 2024 with the debut EP Loosely Aware via OMYAC Records/ONErpm, featuring djent-influenced riffs and percussive elements.

In 2025, Sol Invicto released the full public version of Initium ft. Zach Hill (reissue of a 2011 track with extended drums from Zach Hill of Death Grips/Hella) and launched the ongoing weekly Vault of Shadows Bandcamp series (pay-what-you-want exclusives including "Tokyo Nights", "Under The Surface", etc.).

Sol Invicto remains Carpenter's primary ongoing side project outside of Deftones.

== Artistry ==
Carpenter has stated that he mostly listens to hip-hop, but outside of hip-hop, Meshuggah, Fear Factory, Metallica, Slayer, Anthrax, and Faith No More are some of his influences. He has also stated that his favorite album of all time is Chaosphere by Meshuggah, saying: "The most brutal record I've heard, from second one to second last. It left me wondering where the hell I'd been the whole time." While recording Deftones' Diamond Eyes, he claimed that the only artist he listened to was American rapper Tech N9ne.

== Equipment ==
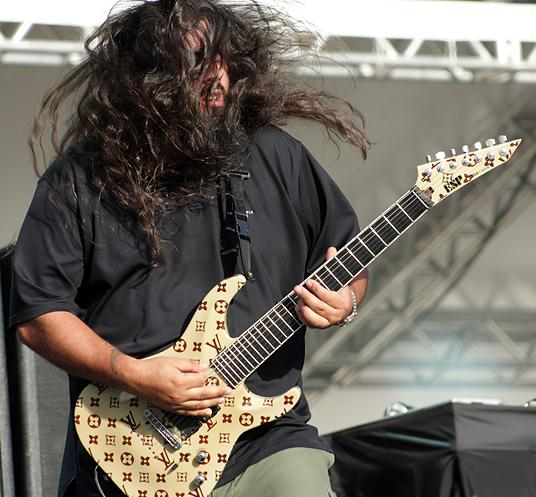
Carpenter performing with Deftones in November 2009

Carpenter currently endorses ESP Guitars, Kiesel Guitars, Marshall Amplifiers, Engl Amplifiers, GuitarRig and Fishman Fluence Signature pickups. He has been a major endorser of ESP since the mid-1990s, with several signature six, seven, eight-string, and baritone models in production. Inspired by Vivian Campbell's signature Kramer guitars from the 1980s, the two humbucker pickups are in the bridge and middle positions instead of the conventional bridge and neck positions.

Carpenter had used Dunlop .011-.069 gauge strings, but is now using Ernie Ball Paradigm strings. He also uses Dunlop 1 mm Tortex picks which are black with a custom logo. Carpenter's current rig consists of several Bogner Ubërschall MK2 150W Guitar Amplifier Heads with KT88 style Tubes. His FX Processing comes from a Line6 Helix that he can switch between using it and his Fractal Audio Systems “Axe-FX II”. This rig is ran into A total of 4 Bogner Cabinets. Two 2x12s and Two 4x12s, These cabinets have Celestion G12T-75 and Celestion V30 Speakers in a checkered pattern.

== Other projects ==
Carpenter was involved in the unreleased rap-metal supergroup Kush, featuring Christian Olde Wolbers and Raymond Herrera of Fear Factory and B-Real of Cypress Hill.

Carpenter also plays drums, stating in interviews that he enjoys the instrument for creating ideas, though he plays "like a guitar player."

== Personal life ==
His relationship with Deftones lead singer and bandmate Chino Moreno has been reported as alternating between cordial and hostile. Though their working relationship has been known to be successful at times, the recording of Saturday Night Wrist was protracted due to their supposed "warfare". With regards to musical tastes, Saturday Night Wrist being described as "more aggressive" equated to it being "more aggressive for him [Chino]"; Carpenter said he'd "definitely be glad to take it to the next level, but that's asking too much right now". During a 2016 interview, Moreno revealed the two had engaged in a backstage altercation following a 2001 concert.

Since 2022, Carpenter has not toured with Deftones internationally due to anxiety related to travel, including following attendance at the Bataclan theatre prior to the November 2015 Paris attacks. Lance Jackman and Shaun Lopez have guest performed when Carpenter is not on domestic tours.

In 2025, Carpenter revealed he had been diagnosed with type 2 diabetes in the prior year. His health problems limited his involvement with recording Deftones' album Private Music, leading to Moreno performing many of the album’s guitar parts.

== Discography ==
=== With Deftones ===
- Adrenaline (1995)
- Around the Fur (1997)
- White Pony (2000)
- Deftones (2003)
- Saturday Night Wrist (2006)
- Eros (recorded 2008, unreleased)
- Diamond Eyes (2010)
- Koi No Yokan (2012)
- Gore (2016)
- Ohms (2020)
- Private Music (2025)

=== With Sol Invicto ===
- Initium I (2011)
- Initium II (2013)
- Initium III (2016)
- Initium White Label Album (2017)
- Loosely Aware (EP, 2024)

=== Guest appearances ===
- "Savory" – Far, Soon (1997)
- "Rizzo" – Chimaira, Pass Out of Existence (2001)
- "The C.I.A. is Still Trying to Kill Me" – Non Phixion, The Future Is Now (2002)
- "By_Myslf" – Linkin Park, Reanimation (2002)
- "I'd Start a Revolution (If I Could Get Up in the Morning)" – Aimee Allen (2003)
- Blue-Sky Research – Taproot (2005)
- "If I Could" – Tech N9ne, All 6's and 7's (2011)
- "El Sol" – Will Haven, Muerte (2018)
- "I Once Breathed" – Truth Corroded, Bloodlands (2019)
