= Philip Margo =

American musician and author (1942–2021)

- Born: April 1, 1942; New York City, New York, U.S.
- Died: November 13, 2021 (aged 79) Los Angeles, California, U.S.
- Genres: Pop
- Occupations: Musician, author, writer
- Formerly of: The Tokens

Philip Frederick Margo (April 1, 1942 – November 13, 2021) was an American musician and author who was a longtime member of the Tokens, along with his brother Mitch. They are best known for their hit recording of "The Lion Sleeps Tonight" which rose to #1 on the Billboard Hot 100 and remained there for three weeks in 1961.

== Biography ==
Margo was born in Brooklyn, New York, on April 1, 1942, to Leon and Ruth (née Becker) Margules. He was of Sephardi and Ashkenazi Jewish origin from the Ottoman Empire, the Austro-Hungarian Empire, and the Russian Empire.

Margo authored the 2010 science fiction novel, The Null Quotient.

He died at a hospital in Los Angeles, California, after suffering a stroke, on November 13, 2021, at the age of 79.

== The Tokens ==
In addition to his singing, Margo also played the drums. He performed with The Tokens on the following television programs:

- The Tonight Show with Jay Leno
- Late Night with Conan O'Brien
- The Tracey Ullman Show

== Record Production ==
With The Tokens, Margo was successful as a record producer for artists including the following:

- The Chiffons
- The Happenings
- Tony Orlando & Dawn
