= Richie Londres =

English record producer and musician

- Born: London, England
- Genres: Alternative metal; Latin music; Hip hop; Drum and bass
- Occupations: Musician, songwriter, record producer, film composer
- Instruments: Guitar, drums, vocals
- Years active: 2005–present
- Website: http://solinvictocomiti.com

Richie Londres is an English record producer, film composer, and guitarist who has collaborated with Deftones and Cypress Hill on various projects. He is the founding member and producer of Sol Invicto, Cultura Londres Proyecto, and Okujira.

== Sol Invicto ==
Londres is the founder and primary producer of the underground instrumental group Sol Invicto, described as cinematic industrial electronic metal. The project features Deftones guitarist Stephen Carpenter, Cypress Hill's Eric Bobo, UK drum and bass producer Technical Itch (Mark Caro), and drummer Dan Foord (ex-SikTh).

After years of private releases via the Sol Invicto Comiti members club (established 2017), the project shifted to public availability starting with the 2024 EP Loosely Aware. In 2025, notable releases include the full public version of Initium ft. Zach Hill (a 21-minute reissue of the 2011 track, mastered by Technical Itch, dedicated to a young fan named Jack). and the ongoing weekly Vault of Shadows Bandcamp series (pay-what-you-want exclusives, e.g., "Tokyo Nights", "Under The Surface", etc.).

Londres has stated in interviews: "I'm open to opportunities and reaching a broader audience, but only on my terms," emphasizing resistance to industry pressures and meaning in imperfection.

== Cultura Londres ==
Cultura Londres Proyecto is a Latin hip hop/electronic project founded by Londres in 2004 with MC Tiago from Bolivia, and featuring Eric Bobo and Juan Rodriguez.

=== Early Years 2004–2008 ===
The group toured extensively in the UK from 2006 to 2008, released several music videos and two EPs, and supported artists such as Ozomatli, La Mala Rodriguez, and Joel Ortiz. They performed at the Rhythms of the World festival in 2005. In 2007, they opened for Ozomatli at Shepherd’s Bush Empire in London. At the Latin Alternative Music Conference (LAMC) 2007, they received a "Super Traveler award" from Remezcla.

=== Hiatus 2008–2022 ===
Cultura Londres underwent musical and lineup changes, receiving positive fan reception worldwide. Due to Tiago's family commitments, focus shifted to Sol Invicto. Londres has expressed intent to return to the project in interviews.

=== Cultura Londres Productions 2022 ===
Revived as Cultura Londres Productions in 2022, focusing on film and television scores for the Latin sector in collaboration with Universal Latino.

== Production ==
Londres is based in London, New York City, and Los Angeles. He uses a combination of Logic Pro, Ableton Live, and live instrumentation. Influences include Motown to Aphex Twin.

== Discography ==
=== With Cultura Londres ===
- "Tiago" (4 track industry sampler) 2004
- "Todo" (Debut EP) 2007
- "Escape Inglaterra" (EP) 2009
- "Radio Bootlegs Volume 1" 2011

=== With Sol Invicto ===
- Public debut with Loosely Aware (EP) 2024 OMYAC Records/ONErpm
- Initium ft. Zach Hill (Single/full version) 2025 Omyac Records/ONErpm
- Vault of Shadows (ongoing weekly series) 2025–present

=== With Necro Deathmort ===
- Return To Planet Atlas (Vocals/FX) (2009, Distraction Records)

=== With Eric Bobo ===
- "Fiesta" / "Todo" (Meeting of the Minds, 2008, Writer/Producer, Nacional Records)
- "Maestro" (Ritmo Machine, 2011, Engineer, Nacional Records)

=== With Universal ===
- "Real Freestyle" / "Ignite The Night" / "Progressions" (La Pasion, 2009, Producer, Universal CHAP347A)

=== With Okujira ===
- Black Gold (Okujira Tapes, 2013)
- King Whale (Okujira Tapes, 2014)
- Sick Of Synchronicity (Okujira Tapes, 2014)
- Drop To The Floor (Okujira Tapes, 2015)
- Omni Ross (Okujira Tapes, 2015)

=== With thekeenone ===
- Attention (Omyac Records/The Orchard, 2023)
- Drop To The Floor (Omyac Records/The Orchard, 2024)

=== Remixes ===
- "Legal Drug Addict (Richie Londres Remix)" Sid Wilson & thekeenone
- "Diamond Eyes" (Deftones) (Sol Invicto Remix) 2010 Warner Bros. Records
- "You've Seen The Butcher" (Deftones) (Sol Invicto Remix) 2010 Warner Bros. Records
- "Morte Et Dabo" (Asking Alexandria) (Sol Invicto Remix) 2011 Sumerian Records
- "A Lesson Never Learned" (Asking Alexandria) (Sol Invicto Remix) 2011 Sumerian Records
