= Mitch Margo =

- Born: Mitchell Stuart Margo; May 25, 1947; Brooklyn, New York, U.S.
- Died: November 24, 2017 (aged 70) Studio City, California, U.S.
- Genre: Doo-wop
- Occupations: Singer, songwriter
- Formerly of: The Tokens

Mitchell Stuart Margo (May 25, 1947 – November 24, 2017) was an American singer and songwriter.

== Career ==
Margo was a professional recording artist by the age of 14. Along with brother Phil Margo, he was a member of The Tokens. The vocal group is best known for its hit recording of "The Lion Sleeps Tonight", which rose to #1 on the Billboard Hot 100 and remained there for three weeks in 1961. Other hits by The Tokens include: "Tonight I Fell In Love" (which Mitch Margo co-wrote), "I Hear Trumpets Blow" (written by Mitch Margo), "He's In Town", and "Portrait of My Love".

Margo also created artwork and animation. His artwork has been displayed and sold in galleries. His paintings have appeared on album covers and his animation has been shown on USA Network. He has illustrated children's books including the award-winning "The Very First Adventure of Fulton T. Firefly". He also wrote and illustrated another children's book called "Sara Smiled".

With the tech help of his son Damien, Margo designed and developed a free online reading tool called the Margo Reader. He hoped to eventually see it in multilingual hand held devices that can be given to anyone who wishes to learn how to read. The reader provides the user with an experience of some of Margo's art, animation, music, photography, voice talent, humor, and heart.

Margo died of natural causes at his home in Studio City, California, at the age of 70.

== The Tokens ==
Margo performed with The Tokens on the following TV shows:

- The Tonight Show with Jay Leno
- Late Night with Conan O'Brien
- The Tracey Ullman Show.

== Record production ==
With The Tokens, Margo was also successful as a producer of artists and songs including:

- The Chiffons
- The Happenings
- Tony Orlando & Dawn

== Composing ==
Margo also composed underscoring as well as songs for the following TV movies:

- "The Kid With the Broken Halo", starring Gary Coleman
- "The Fantastic World Of D.C. Collins", starring Gary Coleman
- "This Wife for Hire", starring Pam Dawber
- "John Grin's Christmas", starring Robert Guillaume
- "Goddess of Love", starring Vanna White

In addition, Margo composed music for a video production of "The Tragedy of Romeo and Juliet" by William Shakespeare.

In 2010, Margo released his first solo album, "ABCDEFG" on Be Cool Records.
