= Sol Invicto =

American music project

- Origin: London, England
- Genres: Drum and bass; electronica; heavy metal; hip hop; industrial
- Years active: 2008–present
- Spinoff of: Deftones; Cypress Hill
- Members: Richie Londres; Stephen Carpenter; Eric Bobo; Technical Itch; Dan Foord
- Website: solinvictocomiti.com

Sol Invicto is an American/British heavy music project, founded by Richie Londres, Eric Bobo of Cypress Hill and Stephen Carpenter of Deftones, joined in the later years by UK drum and bass producer, Technical Itch. The group is mostly instrumental and describe their sound as cinematic industrial electronic metal.

== History ==
The group was formed in 2008 by Richie Londres and Eric Bobo, who previously worked together on the Spanish hip hop project Cultura Londres. Bobo sent a track to Deftones' Stephen Carpenter and the project was born. The band remained relatively underground for many years and was joined in later years by the British drum and bass producer Technical Itch.

The group incorporated in 2017 as private members association; they have never released music to the public. They released their first album in 2017 exclusively to members of the "Sol Invicto Comiti".

In 2023, the band announced on social media it was finalising a deal to release their music to the public on all platforms and still retain the members club. This led to public releases starting in 2024 with the debut EP Loosely Aware, followed by reissues (e.g., full Initium ft. Zach Hill in 2025), revamps (e.g., instrumental version with XRC), and the ongoing Vault of Shadows weekly Bandcamp series launched in October 2025.

Richie Londres has emphasized independence in interviews, stating in a 2025 Capital Chaos TV discussion: "I'm open to opportunities and reaching a broader audience, but only on my terms." He has described the project's evolution as resisting industry pressures while finding meaning in imperfection and raw creation.

== Project members ==
- Richie Londres – Composing/Production/Guitar
- Stephen Carpenter – Guitar
- Eric Bobo – Percussion/drums
- Dan Foord – Drums
- Tech Itch – Production

== Guests/Features ==
- Sean Plague – Vocals
- James Leach – Bass
- Zach Hill – Drums (on Initium reissue)
- Xander Raymond Charles (XRC) – Guitar (on Loosely Aware instrumental revamp)

== Discography ==
- Diamond Eyes (Deftones Remix) 2010 Warner Bros. Records
- You've Seen The Butcher (Deftones Remix) 2010 Warner Bros. Records
- "Morte Et Dabo" (Asking Alexandria Remix) 2011 Sumerian Records
- "A Lesson Never Learned" (Asking Alexandria Remix) 2011 Sumerian Records
- Initium (Album) 2017 Sol Invicto (Private Release)
- The Obvious Play (Single) 2024 Omyac Records/OneRPM
- Loosely Aware (EP) 2024 OMYAC Records/ONErpm
- Initium ft. Zach Hill (Single/full version) 2025 Omyac Records/ONErpm
- Loosely Aware Instrumentals ft. XRC (EP) 2025 Omyac Records/ONErpm
- Vault of Shadows (ongoing weekly Bandcamp series, pay-what-you-want exclusives) 2025–present (includes "You Can't Come Back" (Oct 2025), "Elevate Me" ft. Stephen Carpenter (Nov 2025), "Nothing" (Nov 2025), "There Never Was" (Breakbeat Mix, Nov 2025), "Tokyo Nights" (Nov 2025), "Under The Surface" (synthwave reimagining of "Lost In Translation", Nov 2025), and more)

== Reception ==
Sol Invicto's public releases have received positive coverage in heavy music media, with praise for their experimental blend of industrial, electronic, metal, and drum & bass elements, as well as the raw, cinematic production.

The 2024 debut EP Loosely Aware was described as a "short but storming taste of Sol Invicto's potential" by Punktastic, highlighting its heavy, authentic energy. Metal Planet Music called it a "raging appetiser" after years of underground work, noting the project's intriguing arrival. Revolver emphasized its "gritty, heavy and authentic" nature, quoting Londres on the EP as a "testament to resilience and collaborative spirit."

The 2025 full release of Initium ft. Zach Hill drew attention for its raw, unfiltered 21-minute form and emotional backstory (dedicated to a young fan, Jack, whose story moved Londres deeply). Capital Chaos TV described it as unearthing "raw power" and a refusal to bend to commercial norms, with Londres discussing resistance to industry pressures and meaning in imperfection. ReGen Magazine highlighted its dense atmospheres and rare guest work from Zach Hill.

Ongoing Vault of Shadows weekly drops (2025–present) have been noted for creative reimaginings, such as the synthwave take on "Lost In Translation" as "Under The Surface" (ThePRP). Overall reception focuses on the project's boundary-pushing sound and independent ethos.

== Sources ==
- Sol Invicto (Deftones, Etc.) To Release Future Music Exclusively Through Private Members Club
- Sol Invicto Release Debut Ep
