= The Tokens =

American male doo-wop vocal group

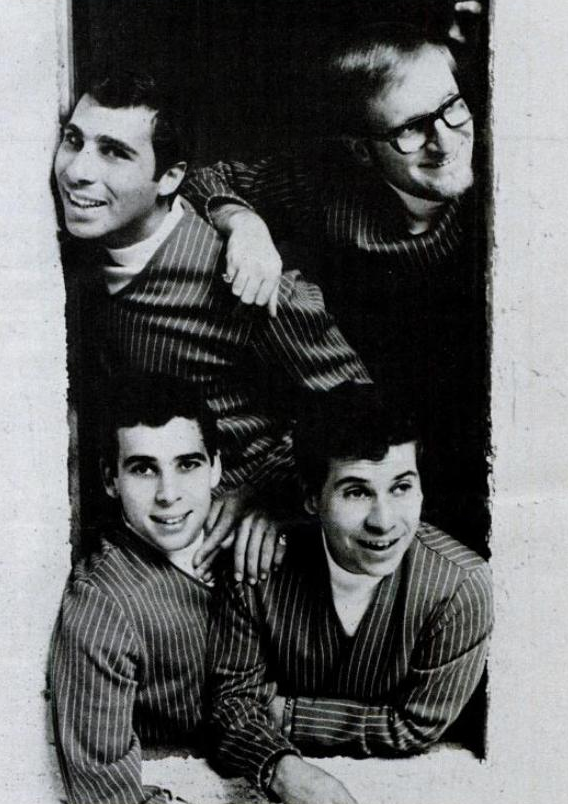
- The Tokens in 1967

Background information
- Origin: Brooklyn, New York, US
- Genres: Doo-wop, pop
- Years active: 1955–1978, 1998–2000
- Labels: Warwick, RCA Victor, Victor Records, RCA Camden, JVC, His Master's Voice, B.T. Puppy Records
- Members: Jay Siegel's Tokens: Jay Siegel; Gabriel Dassa; Kurt Yahjian; The Margo's Tokens: Jay Leslie; Mike Johnson; Noah Margo; Ari Margo; Damien Margo
- Past members: Neil Sedaka; Eddie Rabkin; Cynthia Zolotin; Joe Venneri; Brute Force; Hank Medress; Richie Grasso; Bobby Love; Jay Traynor; Mitch Margo; Bill Reid; Philip "Phil" Margo

The Tokens were an American doo-wop band and record production company group from Brooklyn, New York City. The group had four top 40 hits on the Billboard Hot 100, all in the 1960s, their biggest being the chart-topping 1961 hit single "The Lion Sleeps Tonight", which borrowed heavily from the 1939 song "Mbube" by South African singer Solomon Linda. They are also known for having Neil Sedaka as an original member, before he pursued a solo career.

== History ==
The band was formed in 1955 at Abraham Lincoln High School in Brooklyn, New York, and was known first as the Linc-Tones, a name inspired by the school's name. The original members were Neil Sedaka, Hank Medress, Eddie Rabkin, and Cynthia Zolotin; however, Rabkin was replaced in 1956 by Jay Siegel. In the same year the band recorded its first single, "While I Dream", with Sedaka on lead vocals; the song was a local hit in New York. Sedaka and Howard Greenfield wrote much of the group's early material. They were unusual among teen vocal groups of the time because they were not a cover band. In 1957, Zolotin left the band.

Briefly recording as the Tokens and the Coins, Sedaka left the group in 1958 to launch his solo career. Siegel and Medress then recorded three singles under a side project for Roulette Records, Darrell & the Oxfords in 1959, with two other musicians who never joined the band. Finally establishing its most famous name and line-up, the group became known as the Tokens in 1960 after recruiting the 13-year-old multi-instrumentalist and first tenor Mitch Margo and his baritone brother Philip "Phil" Margo.

In early 1961, the Tokens released a single for Warwick Records titled "Tonight I Fell In Love", which scored No. 15 on the Billboard Hot 100 chart and earned the group an opportunity to perform on the television program American Bandstand. The popularity that the band garnered as a result of this performance brought it new recording opportunities, culminating in its cover of Solomon Linda's "The Lion Sleeps Tonight" for RCA Victor Records. It reached No. 1 on the Billboard Hot 100 chart, where it remained for three weeks. The same track peaked at No. 11 in the UK Singles Chart. Both "Tonight I Fell in Love" and "The Lion Sleeps Tonight" sold more than one million copies, and were awarded gold discs.

From 1962 to 1970, the group released nine more songs that made the Hot 100. In the middle of the British Invasion and the height of Beatlemania, they were one of the few American groups still finding success on popular radio. Jay Siegel was the lead vocalist on all the Tokens' hits including "I Hear Trumpets Blow" (1966) and "Portrait of My Love" (1967). Beginning in 1963, the Tokens also began working as record producers for other artists, such as the Chiffons, Randy & the Rainbows and the Happenings. Their production company was called "Bright Tunes" and they also created their own record company, B.T. (Bright Tunes) Puppy Records. In 1968, The Tokens released the experimental "Animal", intended to serve as lead single for a self-produced album entitled Intercourse. However, the single flopped and Warner Bros. Records rejected the album due to its uncommercial nature and sexual overtones, and so in 1971 the band privately pressed 200 copies of Intercourse through B.T. Puppy. In 1972, Jay Siegel did background vocals for a re-recording of "The Lion Sleeps Tonight" with Robert John as the lead vocalist. This version hit No. 3 on the chart and was awarded a Gold disc.

In 1970, Hank Medress began producing an act for Bell Records, Dawn, which featured the former teen idol Tony Orlando. It was as a favor to Medress that Orlando sang lead on the first record, "Candida", which became a Top 3 hit. In 1973, Medress ended his relationship with the Tokens and Siegel teamed with the Margo Brothers to form the group Cross Country, which had some success with its cover version of "In the Midnight Hour". The Tokens occasionally reunited during 1975 as singing regulars on the Adam Wade-hosted game show Musical Chairs and in 1978 recorded "A Victim of Gravity" for ABC's Schoolhouse Rock.

Brothers Mitch and Philip Margo continued to perform with new members Jay Leslie, Mike Johnson, and Noah Margo (one of Phil Margo's sons) who played drums. Mitch Margo's sons, Damien Margo and Ari Margo, also made occasional guest performances with the band, exemplifying Phil Margo's saying: "If you hang around long enough you can grow your own band".

Siegel continues to perform with his own version of the Tokens. Until 2022 Siegel's Tokens performed featuring bass singer Bill Reid, who had previously sang background with The Halos and had featured on some early 1960s top hits including Curtis Lee's "Pretty Little Angel Eyes" as well as Barry Mann's "Who Put the Bomp (in the Bomp, Bomp, Bomp)". Siegel brought in John "Jay" Traynor, the original lead singer (before Jay Black) of Jay & the Americans and the Mystics who sang with Siegel's Tokens until 2014. Siegel's son was also part of the group as keyboardist and occasional vocalist. The current members of Jay Siegel's Tokens are Kurt "Frenchie" Yaghjian and Gabriel Dassa. Yaghjian appeared in the original Broadway cast of Jesus Christ Superstar and the film version of Hair. Dassa is an orthopedic surgeon and sings with the a cappella group Classic Sounds.

Jay Siegel's Tokens and the Margo brothers reunited in 2000 to perform on the PBS special Doo Wop 51. At the time, Siegel's Tokens were Siegel, Reid and Eddy Rezzonico, who had replaced singer-songwriter Richie Grasso during the 1990s.

Former band member Hank Medress died of lung cancer on June 18, 2007, at his Manhattan home, aged 68. John "Jay" Traynor died of liver cancer on January 2, 2014, at a hospital in Tampa, Florida, aged 70. Mitch Margo died of natural causes on November 24, 2017, at Studio City, California, also aged 70. Philip Margo died of a stroke on November 13, 2021, at a hospital in Los Angeles, aged 79. Bass singer Bill Reid of Jay Siegel's Tokens suffered a heart attack on April 11, 2022, and died shortly afterwards. Founding member Neil Sedaka died February 27, 2026, aged 86.

== Legal controversies ==
=== Rights for "The Lion Sleeps Tonight" ===
Decades after not receiving any publishing credit for their specific original musical composition part of "The Lion Sleeps Tonight", the band filed a lawsuit in order to gain some of these publishing rights. The case was dismissed due to the statute of limitations. To this day, the Tokens claim that some of the original musical composition of the 1961 song was created by them, even though they have not been awarded this status by their record company.

=== Name of the band ===
On October 19, 2009, Phil and Mitch Margo filed suit in Manhattan for the rights to the 'Tokens' name. They claim in their filing that Henry Medress suggested the name. In a competing suit filed in California by Siegel, he claims Siegel, Medress and Sedaka released an album named Neil Sedaka and the Tokens previously. On Sedaka's own website, there is a listing in his discography catalog for a 1958 release of Neil Sedaka and the Tokens as well as a second album, also during 1958, named Neil Sedaka and the Tokens and Coins. Sedaka and Siegel remained close friends after Sedaka left the group for the rest of Sedaka's life.

== Discography ==
=== Albums ===
Year	Album	US
1958	Neil Sedaka and the Tokens	—
1958	Neil Sedaka and the Tokens and Coins	—
1961	The Lion Sleeps Tonight	54
1962	We the Tokens Sing Folk	—
1964	Wheels	—
1966	I Hear Trumpets Blow	148
1966	The Tokens Again	—
1967	Back to Back	134
1967	It's a Happening World	—
1970	Greatest Moments (In a Girl's Life)	—
1971	Both Sides Now	—
1971	December 5	—
1971	InterCourse	—
1973	Cross Country (Note: Cross Country was released by three members of the Tokens, using the band name Cross Country.)	—
1988	Re-Doo-Wopp	—
1993	Oldies Are Now	—
1996	Tonight the Lion Dances	—
1999	Unscrewed	—
"—" denotes releases that did not chart.

=== Singles ===
Year	Titles (A-side, B-side) Both sides from same album except where indicated	Chart positions				Album
Year	Titles (A-side, B-side) Both sides from same album except where indicated	US	US R&B	CAN	UK	Album
1956	"I Love My Baby" b/w "While I Dream" ^{A}	—	—	—	—	Non-album tracks
1961	"Tonight I Fell in Love" b/w "I'll Always Love You"	15	—	12	—	Non-album tracks
1961	"When I Go to Sleep at Night" b/w "Dry Your Eyes" (from The Tokens Again)	—	—	—	—	Non-album tracks
1961	"Sincerely" b/w "When Summer Is Through"	120	—	—	—	Non-album tracks
1961	"The Lion Sleeps Tonight" b/w "Tina"	1	7	1	11	The Lion Sleeps Tonight
1962	"B'wa Nina (Pretty Girl)" b/w "Weeping River"	55	—	—	—	We the Tokens Sing Folk
1962	"Big Boat" b/w "The Riddle"	—	—	26	—	The Lion Sleeps Tonight
1962	"La Bamba" b/w "A Token of Love" (Non-album track)	85	—	—	—	We the Tokens Sing Folk
1962	"Dream Angel Goodnight" b/w "I'll Do My Crying Tomorrow"	—	—	—	—	Non-album tracks
1962	"A Bird Flies Out of Sight" b/w "Wishing" (Non-album track)	—	—	—	—	We the Tokens Sing Folk
1963	"Tonight I Met an Angel" b/w "Hindi Lullaby" (from The Lion Sleeps Tonight)	126	—	—	—	Non-album track
1963	"Hear the Bells" b/w "A-B-C 1-2-3"	94	—	39	—	The Tokens Again
1963	"Please Write" b/w "I'll Always Love You"	108	—	90	—	Non-album tracks
1964	"Let's Go to the Drag Strip" b/w "Two Cars"	—	—	—	—	Wheels
1964	"Swing" b/w "A Girl Named Arlene" (Non-album track)	105	—	—	—	I Hear Trumpets Blow
1964	"Remember Last Summer" b/w "Strange Strange Feeling"; Shown as by The Four Winds	—	—	—	—	Non-album tracks
1964	"He's in Town" b/w "Oh Kathy" (from The Greatest Moments with the Tokens)	43	—	20	—	I Hear Trumpets Blow
1964	"You're My Girl" b/w "Havin' Fun" (Non-album track)	—	—	—	—	The Greatest Moments with the Tokens
1965	"Nobody But You" b/w "Mr. Cupid (Don't You Call On Me)" (Non-album track)	—	—	90	—	The Greatest Moments with the Tokens
1965	"Sylvie Sleepin'" b/w "A Message to the World" (Non-album track)	—	—	—	—	I Hear Trumpets Blow
1965	"Only My Friend" b/w "Cattle Call"	—	—	—	—	Non-album tracks
1965	"The Bells of St. Mary" b/w "Just One Smile"	—	—	68	—	Non-album tracks
1965	"The Three Bells" b/w "A Message to the World" (Non-album track)	120	—	—	—	I Hear Trumpets Blow
1966	"I Hear Trumpets Blow" b/w "Don't Cry, Sing Along with the Music"	30	—	86	—	I Hear Trumpets Blow
1966	"Great Moments in a Girl's Life" b/w "Breezy" (Non-album track)	102	—	—	—	The Greatest Moments with the Tokens
1967	"Green Plant" b/w "Saloogy" (from I Hear Trumpets Blow)	—	—	—	—	Non-album track
1967	"Portrait of My Love" b/w "She Comes and Goes"	36	—	23	—	Portrait of My Love
1967	"It's a Happening World" b/w "How Nice"	69	—	—	—	Portrait of My Love
1967	"Ain't That Peculiar" b/w "Bye, Bye, Bye" (from It's a Happening World)	—	—	—	—	Non-album tracks
1968	"Till" b/w "Poor Man" (from It's a Happening World)	—	—	—	—	Non-album tracks
1968	"Needles of Evergreen" b/w "Mister Snail"	—	—	—	—	Non-album tracks
1968	"Animal" b/w "Bathroom Wall"	—	—	—	—	Non-album tracks
1968	"The Banana Boat Song" b/w "Grandfather" (from It's a Happening World)	—	—	48	—	Non-album tracks
1968	"Some People Sleep" b/w "The World Is Full of Wonderful Things" (Non-album track)	—	—	—	—	Both Sides Now
1969	"Get a Job" b/w "Please Say You Want Me"	—	—	18	—	Non-album tracks
1969	"Go Away Little Girl"/"Young Girl" b/w "I Want to Make Love to You"	118	—	—	—	Non-album tracks
1969	"End of the World" b/w "I Could Be"	—	—	—	—	Non-album tracks
1969	"She Lets Her Hair Down (Early in the Morning)"^{C} b/w "Oh to Get Away" (Non-album track)	61	—	43	—	Both Sides Now
1970	"Let It Ride" b/w "One Face in the Crowd"; Shown as by The Four Winds	—	—	12	—	Non-album tracks
1970	"Don't Worry Baby" b/w "Some People Sleep"	95	—	67	—	Both Sides Now
1970	"Both Sides Now" b/w "I Could See Me (Dancin' with You)" (from December 5)	—	—	—	—	Both Sides Now
1970	"Groovin' on the Sunshine"/"Sesame Street" b/w "Listen to the Words (Listen to the Music)"	—	—	82	—	Non-album tracks
1972	"I Like to Throw My Head Back and Sing (That Good Ole Rock and Roll)" b/w "You and Me"	—	—	—	—	Non-album tracks
1973	"Rock and Roll Music" b/w "Just a Thought" (from Cross Country); Shown as by Cross Country	—	—	—	—	Non-album tracks
1973	"In the Midnight Hour" b/w "A Smile Song"; Shown as by Cross Country	30	—	34	—	Cross Country
1973	"Tastes So Good to Me" b/w "A Ball Song"; Shown as by Cross Country	—	—	—	—	Cross Country
1974	"Penny Whistle Band" b/w "Lord Can't Sing a Solo"	—	—	—	—	Non-album tracks
1977	"Dear Judy" b/w "Come Softly to Me"; Shown as by The 4 Winds	—	—	—	—	Non-album tracks
1988	"Re-Doo-Wopp" b/w "I'm Through with You"	—	—	—	—	Re-Doo-Wopp
1994	"The Lion Sleeps Tonight" (re-release)	51	—	—	—	The Lion Sleeps Tonight (1994 CD reissue)
1996	"Only in My Dreams" (CD single)	—	—	—	—	Tonight, The Lion Dances
1996	"Save the Last Dance for Me" b/w "Suavito"	—	—	—	—	Tonight, The Lion Dances
"—" denotes releases that did not chart or were not released in that territory.

- ^{A}Peaked at No. 39 on the WMGM chart
- ^{C}Peaked at No. 27 on RPM Adult Contemporary chart

== Production work ==
As well as being performing and recording artists the Tokens were also record producers. Here are some of the records they produced:

- "He's So Fine" by the Chiffons
- "One Fine Day" by the Chiffons
- "Denise" by Randy & the Rainbows
- "See You in September" by the Happenings
- "I Got Rhythm" by the Happenings
- "Go Away Little Girl" by the Happenings
- "Candida" by Tony Orlando and Dawn
- "Knock Three Times" by Tony Orlando and Dawn
- "Tie a Yellow Ribbon Round the Ole Oak Tree" by Tony Orlando and Dawn

== Awards and recognition ==
The Tokens were inducted into the Vocal Group Hall of Fame in 2004.

In 1998, the Tokens were mentioned by the Guinness World Records for performing "The Star-Spangled Banner" at all 30 Major League Baseball stadiums in the United States and Canada.
