= The Happenings =

1960s pop music group from New Jersey, US

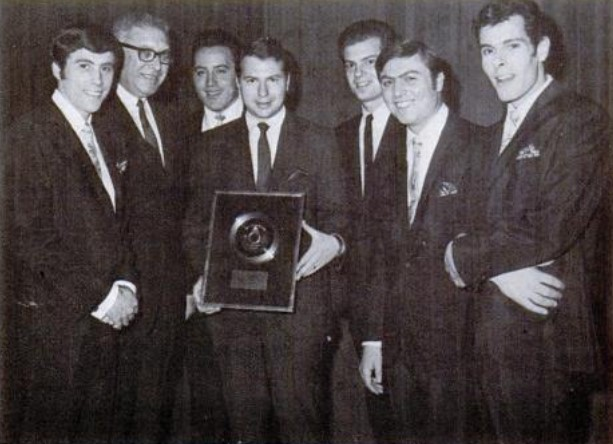
- The Happenings in 1966

Background information
- Origin: Paterson, New Jersey, United States
- Genres: Sunshine pop, cover band
- Years active: 1961–1970
- Labels: B.T. Puppy; Jubilee
- Members: Bob Miranda; Ed Gaudio; Peter Calo
- Past members: David Libert; Tom Giuliano; Ralph DiVito; Bernie LaPorta; Lenny Conforti; George Rizzi; Bob Kulik; Bob Payne; John Paiva
- Website: www.thehappenings.com

The Happenings are a pop music group that originated in the 1960s. Members of the original group, created in the spring of 1961 and initially called "The Four Graduates" because all had just graduated from high school in Paterson, New Jersey, were Bob Miranda, David Libert, Tom Giuliano, and Ralph DiVito. In 1968 DiVito was replaced by Bernie LaPorta and Lenny Conforti also joined to play drums in the touring band. Both LaPorta and Conforti took a hiatus from the northern New Jersey band, the Emerald Experience, to play and tour with The Happenings. That lineup performed mostly at colleges and universities until 1970, when Libert left the band to manage other groups, including George Clinton and Parliament-Funkadelic, Living Colour, Brian Auger, Vanilla Fudge, the Runaways (Cherie Currie, Joan Jett, Lita Ford), Mother's Finest, Alice Cooper and Evelyn "Champagne" King. John Paiva succeeded Libert; Paiva was later recruited to join The Four Seasons' revamped lineup in 1974.

== Overview ==
The band's original concept and much of its commercial success came as a cover band playing classic songs in a unique style. Said Miranda, the group's concept was to "take a song that's already proven it could be a hit and put our spin on it". That "spin" consisted of a combination of rich harmonies on vocals and upbeat tempos marked by prominent percussion and sometimes elaborate orchestration. The group later composed its own songs.

The group's major hits were "See You in September" (1966), which was originally recorded by the Tempos in 1959, and a cover version of the George Gershwin/Ira Gershwin song, "I Got Rhythm" (1967), updated for the group's sunshine pop musical style. "See You In September" and "I Got Rhythm" were on the Billboard Hot 100 charts for 14 weeks in 1966 and 13 weeks in 1967, respectively, forming musical bookends for the 1966–1967 school year, based on their Hot 100 No. 3 peak dates. "I Got Rhythm" and Billy Stewart's "Summertime" also formed Gershwin musical bookends for the same school year, based on the very same Hot 100 peak dates. Disc sales for both "See You in September" and "I Got Rhythm" exceeded one million copies, resulting in R.I.A.A. gold record awards by 1969.

The group had nine Billboard Hot 100 Singles hits from 1966 to 1968, including versions of "Go Away Little Girl" (No. 12) (a No. 1 hit for Steve Lawrence in 1963 and later for Donny Osmond in 1971) and "My Mammy" (No. 13) (popularized by Al Jolson in the 1920s). They also both achieved sales in excess of one million copies, garnering the group another couple of gold records. "Hare Krishna," a version of a song from the musical Hair (1969), was the group's last Hot 100 hit.

The band continues to perform with lead singer Miranda as the only remaining original member.

== Discography ==
=== Albums ===
Year	Album	US	Label
1966	The Happenings	61	B.T. Puppy Records
1967	Back to Back	134	B.T. Puppy Records
1968	The Happenings Golden Hits	156	B.T. Puppy Records
1969	Piece of Mind	181	Jubilee Records
2001	Still Going Strong	—	September Records
"—" denotes releases that did not chart.

=== Singles ===
Year	Titles (A-side, B-side) Both sides from same album except where indicated	Label and number	Chart positions				Album
Year	Titles (A-side, B-side) Both sides from same album except where indicated	Label and number	US	AUS	CAN RPM	UK	Album
1966	"Girls on the Go" b/w "Go-Go" (Non-album track)	B.T. Puppy 517	—	—	—	—	The Happenings
1966	"See You in September" b/w "He Thinks He's a Hero" (from Back to Back)	B.T. Puppy 520	3	100	1	—	The Happenings
1966	"Go Away Little Girl" b/w "Tea Time"	B.T. Puppy 522	12	—	10	—	The Happenings
1966	"Goodnight My Love" b/w "Lillies by Monet"	B.T. Puppy 523	51	—	34	—	Back to Back
1967	"I Got Rhythm" b/w "You're in a Bad Way" (Non-album track)	B.T. Puppy 527	3	66	1	28	Psycle
1967	"My Mammy" b/w "I Believe in Nothing"	B.T. Puppy 530	13	35	7	34	Psycle
1967	"Why Do Fools Fall in Love" b/w "When the Summer Is Through"	B.T. Puppy 532	41	—	56	—	Psycle
1968	"Music Music Music" b/w "When I Lock My Door" (from Psycle)	B.T. Puppy 538	96	—	53	—	The Happenings Golden Hits
1968	"Randy" b/w "The Love Song of Mommy and Dad" (Non-album track)	B.T. Puppy 540	118	—	60	—	The Happenings Golden Hits
1968	"Sealed with a Kiss" b/w "Anyway" (Non-album track)	B.T. Puppy 542	—	—	—	—	The Happenings Golden Hits
1968	"Breaking Up Is Hard to Do" b/w "Anyway" (Non-album track)	B.T. Puppy 543	67	—	48	—	The Happenings Golden Hits
1968	"Crazy Rhythm" b/w "Love Song of Mommy and Dad"	B.T. Puppy 545	—	—	—	—	Non-album tracks
1969	"That's All I Want from You" b/w "He Thinks He's a Hero" (from Back to Back)	B.T. Puppy 549	—	—	—	—	Non-album tracks
1969	"Where Do I Go / Be-In / Hare Krishna" b/w "New Day Comin'"	Jubilee 5666	66	92	35	—	Piece of Mind
1969	"El Paso County Jail" b/w "Won't Anybody Listen"	Jubilee 5677	—	—	—	—	Non-album tracks
1969	"Answer Me, My Love" b/w "I Need a Woman"	Jubilee 5686	115	—	88	—	Non-album tracks
1970	"Tomorrow Today Will Be Yesterday" b/w "Chain of Hands"	Jubilee 5698	—	—	—	—	Non-album tracks
1970	"Crazy Love" b/w "Chain of Hands"	Jubilee 5702	—	—	—	—	Non-album tracks
1971	"Lullaby in the Rain" b/w "I Wish You Could Know Me (Naomi)"	Jubilee 5712	—	—	—	—	Non-album tracks
1971	"Make Your Own Kind of Music" (stereo) b/w "Make Your Own Kind of Music" (mono)	Jubilee 5721	—	—	—	—	Non-album tracks
1972	"Workin' My Way Back to You" b/w "Strawberry Morning"	Big Tree 146	—	—	—	—	Non-album tracks
1972	"Me Without You" b/w "God Bless Joanna"	Big Tree 153	—	—	—	—	Non-album tracks
1977	"That's Why I Love You" b/w "Beyond the Hurt"	Midland International 10897	—	—	—	—	Non-album tracks
1977	"Let Me Stay" b/w "Someone Special"	Midland International 11127	—	—	—	—	Non-album tracks
"—" denotes releases that did not chart or were not released in that territory.
