= Vanilla Ice discography =

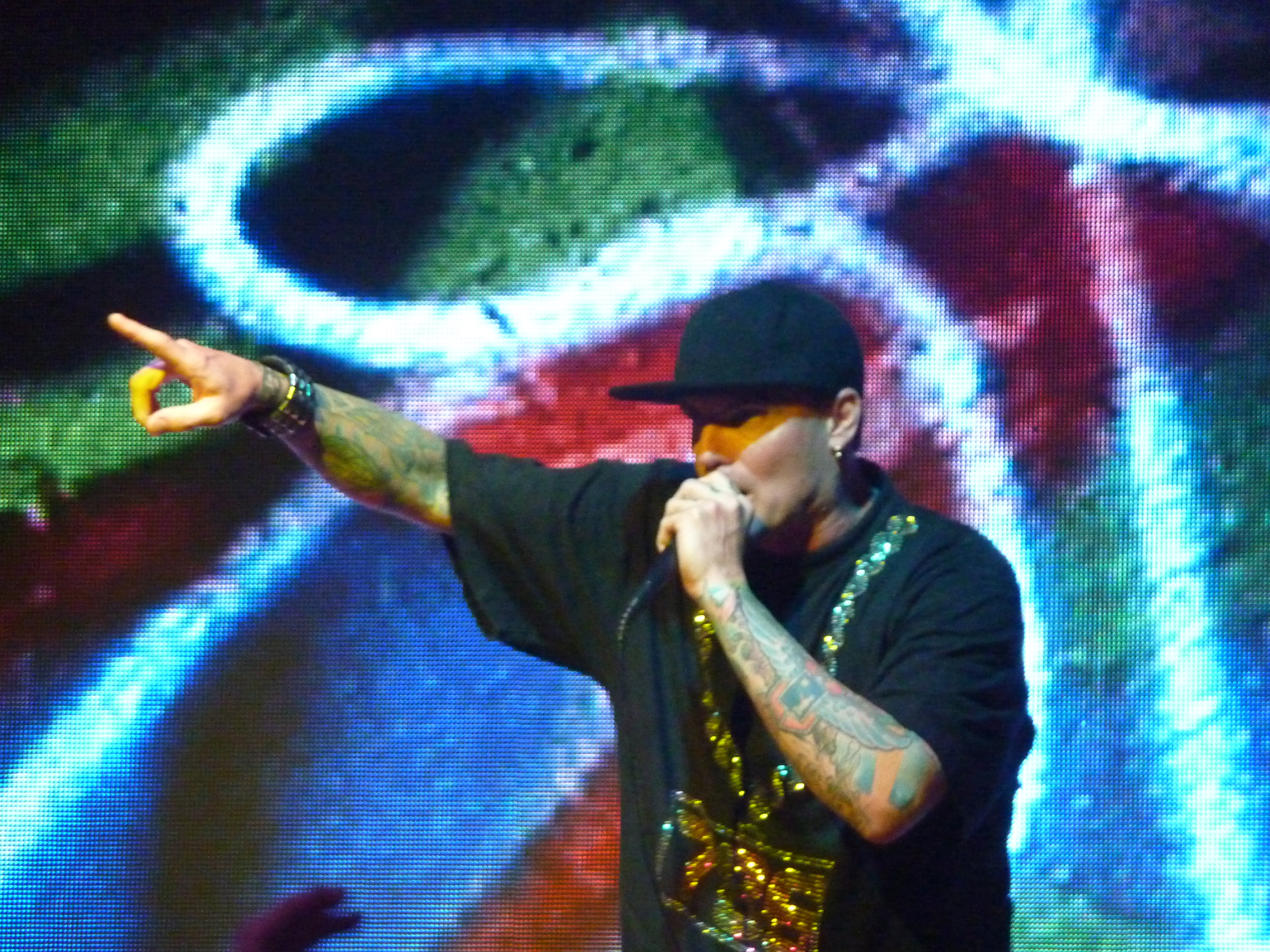
- Vanilla Ice performing in 2010
- Studio albums: 6
- Live albums: 1
- Compilation albums: 2
- Singles: 25
- Video albums: 3
- Music videos: 24
- Remix albums: 1

American rapper Vanilla Ice has released six studio albums, two compilation albums, one live album, one remix album and 25 singles. His debut album, To the Extreme, was the fastest-selling hip hop album of all time. His first single "Ice Ice Baby" was the first hip hop song to top the Billboard charts, and has been credited with helping to diversify hip hop by introducing it to a mainstream white audience. Soundtrack appearances and a live album, Extremely Live continued the success but a second mainstream studio album Mind Blowin' featured an image change which saw a massive drop in popularity for Ice. Further albums, including Hard to Swallow, Bi-Polar and Platinum Underground, featured a less mainstream rock-oriented sound, and did not chart.

In 2008, a remix album titled Vanilla Ice Is Back! was released via Cleopatra Records. The version that got released with ReAnnimotor did Chart at 45. The album failed to chart; however, "Ice Ice Baby" was re-released as a single in the United Kingdom, where it reached number 146 on the UK Singles Chart. A sixth studio album, W.T.F. (Wisdom, Tenacity and Focus), was officially released on August 30, 2011, after being delayed for two years.

== Albums ==
=== Studio albums ===
Title	Details	Peak chart positions						Certifications (sales threshold)
Title	Details	US	US R&B	AUS	NZ	SWE	UK	Certifications (sales threshold)
To the Extreme	Release date: September 10, 1990; Label: SBK; Formats: CD, vinyl, cassette	1	6	9	11	17	4	AUS: Platinum; CAN: 6× Platinum; NZ: Gold; UK: Platinum; US: 7× Platinum
Mind Blowin'	Release date: March 22, 1994; Label: SBK; Formats: CD, cassette	—	—	—	—	—	—	
Hard to Swallow	Release date: October 20, 1998; Label: Universal; Formats: CD, cassette	—	—	—	—	—	—	
Bi-Polar	Release date: October 23, 2001; Label: Liquid 8; Formats: CD, cassette	—	—	—	—	—	—	
Platinum Underground	Release date: August 16, 2005; Label: Ultrax; Formats: CD, music download	—	—	—	—	—	—	
W.T.F. (Wisdom, Tenacity and Focus)	Release date: August 30, 2011; Label: Radium; Formats: CD, music download	—	—	—	—	—	—	
"—" denotes releases that did not chart

=== Live albums ===
Title	Details	Peak chart positions			Certifications (sales threshold)
Title	Details	US	AUS	UK	Certifications (sales threshold)
Extremely Live	Release date: March 6, 1991; Label: SBK Records; Formats: CD, cassette	30	56	35	CAN: Gold; US: Gold

=== Compilation albums ===
Title	Details
Back 2 Back Hits	Release date: April 10, 1998; Label: Capitol Records; Formats: CD, cassette
The Best of Vanilla Ice	Release date: February 23, 1999; Label: EMI America; Formats: CD, cassette

=== Remix albums ===
Title	Details
Vanilla Ice Is Back!	Release date: November 4, 2008; Label: Cleopatra; Formats: CD, music download

== Video albums ==
Title	Album details
Play That Funky Music Whiteboy	Released: November 12, 1990; Label: SBK Music Video; Format: VHS, Laserdisc; RIAA: Platinum

== Singles ==
=== As lead artist ===
Year	Single	Peak chart positions									Certifications (sales threshold)	Album
Year	Single	US	US Dance	US R&B	US Rap	AUS	CAN	GER	NZ	UK	Certifications (sales threshold)	Album
1990	"Play That Funky Music"	4	—	22	7	13	13	19	7	10	US: Gold	To the Extreme
1990	"Ice Ice Baby"	1	28	6	1	1	1	2	1	1	US: Platinum; AUS: Platinum; CAN: Gold; GER: Gold; NZ: Platinum; UK: Platinum	To the Extreme
1990	"I Love You"	52	—	—	—	103	—	65	30	45		To the Extreme
1991	"Rollin' in My 5.0"	—	—	—	—	53	—	70	—	27		Extremely Live
1991	"Satisfaction"	—	—	—	—	97	—	41	—	22		Extremely Live
1991	"Road to My Riches"	—	—	—	—	168	—	—	—	—		Extremely Live
1991	"Ninja Rap”	—	—	—	—	—	—	—	—	—		Teenage Mutant Ninja Turtles II The Secret of the Ooze OST
1991	"Cool as Ice (Everybody Get Loose)" (featuring Naomi Campbell)	81	—	—	—	171	—	—	—	—		Cool as Ice OST
1994	"Roll 'Em Up"	—	—	—	—	—	—	—	—	—		Mind Blowin'
1994	"The Wrath"	—	—	—	—	—	—	—	—	—		Mind Blowin'
1995	"Get Loose"	—	—	—	—	—	—	—	—	—		Mind Blowin'
1998	"Too Cold”	—	—	—	—	—	—	—	—	—		Hard to Swallow
1999	"S.N.A.F.U." (featuring Jimmy Pop)	—	—	—	—	—	—	—	—	—		Hard to Swallow
2001	"Nothing Is Real"	—	—	—	—	—	—	—	—	—		Bi-Polar
2002	"Get Your Ass Up" (featuring Pearla)	—	—	—	—	—	—	—	—	—		Bi-Polar
2002	"Tha Weed Song" (featuring Rahan)	—	—	—	—	—	—	—	—	—		Bi-Polar
2002	"Hot Sex"	—	—	—	—	—	—	—	—	—		Bi-Polar
2002	"Elvis Killed Kennedy" (featuring Chuck D and Rahan)	—	—	—	—	—	—	—	—	—		Bi-Polar
2005	"Survivor"	—	—	—	—	—	—	—	—	—		Platinum Underground
2006	"Tell Me Why" (featuring Gemini and Zeno)	—	—	—	—	—	—	—	—	—		Platinum Underground
2007	"Ninja Rap 2”	—	—	—	—	—	—	—	—	—		Platinum Underground
2010	"Turn It Up"	—	—	—	—	—	—	—	—	—		W.T.F. (Wisdom, Tenacity And Focus)
2010	"Born On Halloween" (featuring Insane Clown Posse)	—	—	—	—	—	—	—	—	—		W.T.F. (Wisdom, Tenacity And Focus)
2011	"Jump Around"	—	—	—	—	—	—	—	—	—		Vanilla Ice Is Back!
"—" denotes releases that did not chart

=== As featured artist ===
Year	Single	Peak chart positions		Album
Year	Single	IRE	UK	Album
2001	"Ice Ice Baby 2001" (ReAnimator featuring Vanilla Ice)	—	—	Non-album single
2008	"Ice Ice Baby 2008" (ReAnimator featuring Big Daddi and Vanilla Ice)	—	—	Non-album single
2010	"Under Pressure (Ice Ice Baby)" (Jedward featuring Vanilla Ice)	1	2	Planet Jedward
2011	"Ice Ice Baby" (MattyB featuring Vanilla Ice)	—	—	Non-album single

== Guest appearances ==
Year	Song	Album
1996	"Boom" (Bloodhound Gang featuring Vanilla Ice)	One Fierce Beer Coaster
2001	"Size Queen" (Betty Blowtorch featuring Vanilla Ice)	Are You Man Enough?
2005	"Swallow This Nut" (Insane Clown Posse featuring Vanilla Ice, Fresh Kid Ice, Fish 'N' Grits & MC Breed)	Forgotten Freshness Volume 4
2006	"Cowboy Style" (Steve Forde & The Flange featuring Vanilla Ice, Barney Rubble & Zeno)	Rowdy
2012	"Still Unbreakable" (Des-ROW featuring Vanilla Ice)	Rhythm Party (Boom Boom Dance) (soundtrack)
2012	"BEFREE" (Des-ROW featuring Vanilla Ice)	Rhythm Party (Boom Boom Dance) (soundtrack)
2015	"Tommy Lee Jones" (Louie Sace featuring Vanilla Ice)	
2017	"Vanilla Sprite Remix" (Forgiato Blow featuring Rick Ross and Vanilla Ice)	Forever Blue

== Unreleased and demos ==
Song	Other notes
"Off the Chain"	Unreleased song with 7x70; guest vocals only
"Halloween"	Demo instrumental
"Where tha Dogs At? (All Night Long)"	Performed live in 1992. Never released.
"We Came to Party"	Performed live in 1987-1989. Never released.
"Ice"	Performed live in 2015. Originally set to be the first single of his upcoming album.

== Soundtrack appearances ==
Year	Song	From
1991	"Ninja Rap"	Teenage Mutant Ninja Turtles II: The Secret of the Ooze: The Original Motion Picture Soundtrack
1991	"Cool As Ice (Everybody Get Loose)"	Cool As Ice Soundtrack
1991	"The People's Choice"	Cool As Ice Soundtrack
1991	"Never Wanna Be Without You"	Cool As Ice Soundtrack
1991	"Get Wit' It"	Cool As Ice Soundtrack
1992	"Ice Ice Baby"	Alyas Boy Kano
1993	"Ice Ice Baby"	Beavis and Butt-Head
1996	"I Love You"	Beavis and Butt-Head
1997	"I Love You"	Beavis and Butt-Head
1998	"Ice Ice Baby"	Disturbing Behavior
1999	"Too Cold"	Behind the Music
1999	"S.N.A.F.U."	Behind the Music
1999	"Hooked"	Behind the Music
1999	"Ice Is Workin' It"	Behind the Music
1999	"Play That Funky Music"	Behind the Music
1999	"Stop That Train"	Behind the Music
1999	"Fame"	Behind the Music
1999	"Ninja Rap"	Behind the Music
1999	"Cool As Ice (Everybody Get Loose)"	Behind the Music
1999	"Ice Ice Baby"	Behind the Music
1999	"Zig Zag Stories"	Behind the Music
1999	"A.D.D."	Behind the Music
1999	"Fuck Me"	Behind the Music
1999	"The Wrath"	Behind the Music
1999	"Ice Ice Baby"	Tuftsablanca
2003	"Size Queen"	Betty Blowtorch: And Her Amazing True Life Adventures
2003	"Ice Ice Baby"	Dumb and Dumberer: When Harry Met Lloyd
2004	"Ice Ice Baby"	13 Going on 30
2004	"Ice Is Workin' It"	Little Black Book
2005	"Ice Ice Baby"	I Love the '80s 3-D
2005	"Hot Sex"	The Helix...Loaded
2007	"Play That Funky Music"	20 to 1
2008	"Ice Ice Baby"	Step Brothers
2008	"Swallow This Nut"	Death Racers
2008	"Ice Ice Baby"	Talkshow with Spike Feresten
2009	"Ice Ice Baby (Radio Edit)"	Cyprien
2010	"Under Pressure (Ice Ice Baby)"	15th National Television Awards
2010	"Ice Ice Baby"	Live from Studio Five
2010	"Under Pressure (Ice Ice Baby)"	Live from Studio Five
2011	"Ice Ice Baby"	Kinect Sports: Season Two
2011	"Ice Ice Baby"	Formula 1: BBC Sport: 2011 British Grand Prix
2012	"Ice Ice Baby"	CSI: Crime Scene Investigation
2012	"Ice Ice Baby"	That's My Boy
2012	"Ice Ice Baby"	Dance Central 3
2012	"Still Unbreakable"	Rhythm Party (Boom Boom Dance)
2012	"BEFREE"	Rhythm Party (Boom Boom Dance)

== Music videos ==
=== As lead artist ===
Year	Song	Director
1990	"Ice Ice Baby"	Greg Synodis
1991	"Play That Funky Music"	Greg Synodis
1991	"I Love You"	Michael Bay
1991	"Stop That Train"	Greg Synodis
1991	"Rollin in My 5.0"	Greg Synodis
1991	"Satisfaction"	Greg Synodis
1991	"Ninja Rap"	
1991	"Cool as Ice"	David Kellogg
1991	"Get Wit It"	David Kellogg
1991	"The People's Choice"	
1994	"Roll 'Em Up	Drew Stone
1994	"The Wrath"	Drew Stone
1998	"Too Cold"	Cuzzin Myke
2001	"Nothing Is Real"	
2010	"Born On Halloween" (featuring Insane Clown Posse)	V Ice 2 Productions
2011	"Detonator"	Bjarni Gautur
2011	"Rock Star Party"	V Ice 2 Productions
2012	"Ice Ice Baby (Zumba Remix)"	Zumba Fitness
2020	"Ride the Horse"	Ghost
2023	"Put Your Hands Up"	

=== As featured artist ===
Year	Song	Director
2000	"Ice Ice Baby 2001" (ReAnimator featuring Vanilla Ice)	Stefan Browatzki
2010	"Under Pressure (Ice Ice Baby)" (Jedward featuring Vanilla Ice)	Dale "Rage" Resteghini
2011	"Ice Ice Baby" (MattyB featuring Vanilla Ice)	
2015	"Tommy Lee Jones" (Louie Sace featuring Vanilla Ice)	NasaBoy EM
2019	"Vanilla Sprite" (Forgiato Blow featuring Vanilla Ice)	Ghost
