= The Best of Vanilla Ice =

Greatest hits album by Vanilla Ice
- Released: February 23, 1999; March 13, 2001 (EMI release); August 22, 2006 (Collectables Records release)
- Length: 46:08
- Label: Platinum Disc Records; EMI; Collectables Records

Vanilla Ice chronology
Hard to Swallow (1998)	The Best of Vanilla Ice (1999)	Bi-Polar (2001)

Professional ratings
Review scores
Source	Rating
AllMusic	3/5 stars

The Best of Vanilla Ice is a greatest hits album by American rapper Vanilla Ice. Released in 1999 by Platinum Disc Records, it features songs from the rapper's major label albums To the Extreme, Extremely Live, Cool as Ice (soundtrack) and Mind Blowin. No tracks from the 1998 album Hard to Swallow are included. The Best of Vanilla Ice was reissued by EMI, and later Collectables Records.

== Track listing ==
1. "Ice Ice Baby" - 4:31
2. "Get Wit' It"- 5:09
3. "Play That Funky Music" (live)- 4:45
4. "Roll 'Em Up"- 4:29
5. "Rollin' in My 5.0" (live)- 4:17
6. "Cool as Ice (Everybody Get Loose)"- 5:31
7. "Hooked"- 4:52
8. "I Love You"- 5:05
9. "Ninja Rap"- 3:46
10. "Satisfaction"- 3:43
