= Zombie Plane =

Upcoming Australian film by Lav Bodnaruk and Michael Mier

- Theatrical release poster
- Directed by: Lav Bodnaruk; Michael Mier
- Written by: William Strong; Lav Bodnaruk
- Produced by: Jessica Butland; Lav Bodnaruk; Michael Mier; Fez Lateef
- Starring: Vanilla Ice; Sophie Monk; Ann Truong; Dan Ewing; Teressa Liane; Amy Shark; Natalie Bassingthwaighte; Bob Geldof; Brian Austin Green; Cody Simpson; John Jarratt; Nicky Whelan; Stephen Curry; Chuck Norris; Ice-T
- Cinematography: Lav Bodnaruk
- Edited by: Lav Bodnaruk
- Music by: Peter Spierig
- Distributed by: Radioactive Pictures (AU); Entertainment Squad (US)
- Release date: 2027
- Country: Australia
- Language: English
- Budget: A$6.2 million

Zombie Plane is an upcoming Australian action comedy film directed by Lav Bodnaruk and Michael Mier about a government organisation's efforts to prevent a zombie outbreak using high-profile celebrities. It stars an ensemble cast that includes Vanilla Ice, Sophie Monk, and Chuck Norris (in his final film role before his death) as fictitious versions of themselves. A press release on the film stated that it "uses comedy, the zombie genre and '90s nostalgia as a vehicle, to comment on pop-culture as much as it feeds it".

The film is scheduled for theatrical release in 2027.

== Plot ==
Undercover agent Vanilla Ice, who trained under Commander Chuck Norris, uses his skill set to dispatch a plane overrun by the undead before fighter jets can neutralise it to save humanity from a zombie outbreak.

== Cast ==
- Chuck Norris as Commander Chuck Norris
- Vanilla Ice as Agent Vanilla Ice
- Sophie Monk as Sophie Monk
- Ann Truong
- Dan Ewing
- Teressa Liane
- Amy Shark
- Natalie Bassingthwaighte
- Bob Geldof
- Brian Austin Green
- Cody Simpson
- John Jarratt
- Nicky Whelan
- Stephen Curry
- Ice-T

== Production ==
Mier said that the idea for the film was inspired by a TMZ episode screenwriter William Strong had seen, in which Ice told the reporter that some kind of biohazard had caused his flight to be grounded. The script employs self-referential humour that "mercilessly mocks its main stars": for example, Monk spends a considerable amount of time deriding Ice's career in the film, at one point referring to him as "a one-hit wonder and a has-been".

On 16 October 2023, The Hollywood Reporter and Entertainment Weekly jointly announced that Chuck Norris, Vanilla Ice, and Sophie Monk would be playing themselves in Zombie Plane, an action comedy film which was directed by Australian filmmakers Lav Bodnaruk and Michael Mier. THR also noted that the film would feature additional celebrity cameos as well as "a '90s pop soundtrack including tracks by Ice himself".

On 1 November 2023, The Hollywood Reporter reported scenes "mostly in a purpose-built 60-meter long airplane" were shot in Brisbane.

On 1 November 2023, The Hollywood Reporter reported that Mier had almost sanitised the film's heavy use of the word "fuck" (one of which is "mischievously" uttered toward an eight-year-old character) as demanded by American censors, but that they had reconsidered their decision and allowed him to keep it in the film.

A June 17, 2025 Variety article reported that principal photography on the film had been completed in Gold Coast, Queensland, with Ice-T, Brian Austin Green, Stephen Curry, and Kyle Sandilands (in a cameo appearance) confirmed to have joined the cast.

== Marketing ==
The film was presented at the American Film Market (AFM) in November 2023, as well as the Marché du Film section of the 2024 Cannes Film Festival.

== Release ==
Zombie Plane is scheduled for theatrical release in 2027.

== See also ==
- List of zombie films
