= Platinum Underground =

Studio album by Vanilla Ice
- Released: August 16, 2005
- Recorded: 2002–05
- Studio: Maximedia Studios (Dallas, Texas)
- Genre: Hip hop; rap rock; nu metal
- Length: 64:06
- Label: Ultrax
- Producer: Vanilla Ice, DJ Dont Play, The Trak Starz, Seven Antonopoulos, Gemini, DJ Street, Semaj Foreman

Vanilla Ice chronology
| Bi-Polar (2001) | Platinum Underground (2005) | Vanilla Ice Is Back! (2008) |

Singles from Platinum Underground
- 1. "Survivor" Released: July 24, 2005; 2. "Tell Me Why" Released: February 2, 2006; 3. "Ninja Rap 2" Released: 2007

Professional ratings
Review scores
| Source | Rating |
|---|---|
| Allmusic | 1/5 stars |

Platinum Underground is the fifth studio album by American rapper Vanilla Ice. Released on August 16, 2005, it is the rapper's third independent release, after Hooked and Bi-Polar. Allmusic reviewer Rob Theakston panned the album, writing that it "has more bad spots in it than most unless you are a diehard fan".

The title alludes to Ice's current tours playing to fans of underground music, in contrast to his history as an RIAA certified platinum artist. He followed up the album with 2011's W.T.F..

== Production ==
Platinum Underground was the first Vanilla Ice album with original content released by Ultrax since 1994. Van Winkle was interested in using all the different genres he had experiences with in earlier albums, not focusing on marketing or trying to attract a certain audience. Songs like "Trailer Park Mullet Wars" and "Step Up or Shut Up" were a hybrid mix of different heavy metal sounds, while "Say Goodbye" and "Bounce" were new school hip hop. The rest of the album featured mixes of horrorcore, reggae and hardcore hip hop.

The name of the album was a reference to Van Winkle's underground hip hop status while still having a loyal fanbase and having gone Platinum in the past. Ultrax also released a censored version of the album with hopes of being able to attract a wider audience.

== Music ==
"Step Up or Shut Up" was the first song to premiere of the album, originally played during Vanilla Ice's 2003 Metal Tour. "Detonator" and "O.K.S. - Original Killa Shit" were originally made for Bi-Polar, and they appeared on Platinum Underground without any alterations.

After appearing on the second season of The Surreal Life, Ice was more willing to accept his past after conversations with Tammy Faye Messner, who also appears on the album. With interest to re-visit the past, Ice re-recorded "Ice Ice Baby" in the style of how he performed it during his tours. After getting requests to do "Ninja Rap" live, Ice decided to make a song entitled "Ninja Rap 2" (also known as "Go Ninja Go") which was set to be a hardcore remix. Despite the name, the song has very little connections to Van Winkle's original 1991 single, but rather stays true to Ice's current lyricism, where Ice talks about his appreciation to his fans, his love to perform at clubs and playing at the Gathering of the Juggalos with Insane Clown Posse. "Ninja Rap 2" was the first song to be released from Platinum Underground and was available to download for free off of Ice's official website.

The first single off the album, "Survivor," premiered on the NBC television special Hit Me Baby One More Time, which documented Vanilla Ice writing, producing, and finally performing the song live for a crowd in England. The chorus and hook were based on "Survivor" by Destiny's Child.

Most of the songs were produced by Ice himself with additional production by whatever disc jockey Ice was using during that particular session. One song featured production by Insane Poetry (this being their second collaboration after Hard to Swallow) while "Dunn Natt" was produced by The Trak Starz.

== Lyrics ==
"Survivor" deals with Vanilla Ice's past, where he mentions how he survived the music industry, being used by executives to sell items, his suicide attempt and relationship with Madonna and the death of friend Dimebag Darrell. Ice goes on that there are somethings he regrets, other things that he won't take back, having no interest in pity and that he hopes the songs will live on when he dies. "Dunn Natt" has some similar lyrics but also references Ice's heavy drug use in the 1990s, particularly cocaine.

"Hustlin" has Ice describing being hated but having no fear or worrying about his career knowing that nothing will last forever and that nothing matters but his family, but he is going to continue making music as long as he'll have a following. "Tell Me Why" is a dramatic song about the world's current condition while "Say Goodbye" features Vanilla Ice heavily disrespecting an unnamed individual who he had a falling out with for disrespecting him and claiming to be the one who helped him rise to fame. Ice raps about talking to a judge as he's explaining why he murdered him by shooting him in the eye. The song could be referring to Chocolate, a rapper that collaborated with Vanilla Ice before he became famous and later claimed to have written "Ice Ice Baby".

"Ninja Rap 2" and "Bounce", like older songs by Vanilla Ice are very club-oriented and feature Ice encouraging people to dance and party while "Cruisin in My 6'4" is more relaxed, featuring Ice describing simply riding in his car while smoking a joint.

== Track listing ==
| No. | Title | Writer(s) | Length |
|---|---|---|---|
| 1. | "Survivor" | Vanilla Ice | 2:54 |
| 2. | "Ninja Rap 2" | Vanilla Ice | 3:05 |
| 3. | "Leaders of the Nu-School" (featuring Mecca) | Vanilla Ice and Mecca | 4:22 |
| 4. | "Trailer Park Mullet Wars" | Vanilla Ice | 3:14 |
| 5. | "O.K.S." (featuring Cyco) | Cyco, DJ Street and Vanilla Ice | 3:40 |
| 6. | "Dunn Natt" | Vanilla Ice and Track Starz | 4:05 |
| 7. | "Step Up or Shut Up" | Vanilla Ice | 3:02 |
| 8. | "Say Goodbye" | Vanilla Ice | 3:43 |
| 9. | "Hustlin'" | Vanilla Ice | 3:11 |
| 10. | "Ice Ice Baby" (Remix) | Vanilla Ice | 4:10 |
| 11. | "Bounce" | Vanilla Ice and 2-Hype | 3:48 |
| 12. | "Tell Me Why" (featuring Gemini and Zero) | Vanilla Ice, Gemini and Zero | 5:34 |
| 13. | "Cruisin' in My '64" | Vanilla Ice | 3:19 |
| 14. | "Detonator" (featuring Train) | Vanilla Ice | 3:38 |
| 15. | "Persevere" | Vanilla Ice | 3:56 |
| 16. | "Tank" | | 0:25 |
| 17. | "Flyin' Hawaiian" | | 0:59 |
| 18. | "UFC" | | 0:20 |
| 19. | "Joe" | | 0:09 |
| 20. | "Scotty Mack" | | 0:26 |
| 21. | "Aussie Steve" | | 0:20 |
| 22. | "Clint" | | 0:20 |
| 23. | "Penthouse" | | 3:17 |
| 24. | "Tammy Faye" | | 0:26 |
| 25. | "My Kids" | | 1:32 |
| Total length: | | | 59:34 |

== Samples ==
Leaders of the Nu-School

- "Synthetic Substitution" by Melvin Bliss

Dunn Natt

- "Ice Ice Baby" by Vanilla Ice

My '64

- "Bring the Noise" by Public Enemy
- "Ice Ice Baby" by Vanilla Ice
- "Boyz-n-the-Hood" by Eazy-E

Bounce

- "New York Groove" by Ace Frehley
