= Rollin' in My 5.0 =

Single by Vanilla Ice

from the album Extremely Live
- B-side: "Rollin in My 5.0" (live version)
- Released: March 1, 1991
- Recorded: 1990
- Length: 3:50 (radio edit); 4:47 (album version)
- Label: SBK
- Songwriters: Vanilla Ice; Earthquake; Steve Miller; Steve McCarty
- Producer: Vanilla Ice

Vanilla Ice singles chronology
"Cool as Ice (Everybody Get Loose)" (1991)	"Rollin' in My 5.0" (1991)	"Satisfaction" (1991)

Music video
- "Rollin' in My 5.0" with Adam Sandler & DJ Earthquake on YouTube

"Rollin' in My 5.0" is a hip hop song written by American rapper Vanilla Ice. The song samples "Fly Like an Eagle" by the Steve Miller Band. The studio version of the song was only found on the single as it was originally intended to be featured on Mind Blowin'. It is about Vanilla Ice's 5.0 Liter Fox body Ford Mustang.

== Lyrics ==
The name is a reference to a part in "Ice Ice Baby". The song is a rap ballad following Ice's adventures cruising around Miami with the V.I.P. Posse, looking for girls while competing in illegal street racing. Ice also thanks his fans for buying his last album. During the time the single and album was conceived, critics were stating that Ice was purposely sidestepping hard issues to grab the pop charts, but Ice responded that he's made the music the way he wanted to make it, stating "I just thought of a style that hasn't been played out".

== Release and music video ==
The studio version was only released as a single while the live version appeared on the album Extremely Live. SBK Records and Ultrax produced a music video for the song which featured heavy airplay during its original release in order to get people interested in the upcoming album. The music video featured Ice alongside the V.I.P. dancers performing in front of a green screen, and clips of Ice cruising in Miami and Dallas.

== Reception ==
"Rollin' in My 5.0" was one of Ice's most popular songs in the early '90s following his mainstream success and To the Extreme. The song and music video were retired on most music channels and radios in 1992. "Rollin'" by Limp Bizkit pays tribute to this song, while Ice references it himself in his song "Cruisin in My 6'4", from his 2005 album Platinum Underground. In 2009, Vanilla Ice joined Steve Miller Band on stage to perform "Fly Like an Eagle".

The song is included on the 2008 EMI release The Best of Vanilla Ice.

== Track listings ==
- 7" single
1. "Rollin' in My 5.0" (studio edit) – 3:49
2. "Rollin' in My 5.0" (live edit) – 3:49
- US 12" maxi
1. "Rollin' in My 5.0" (studio full version) – 4:40
2. "Play That Funky Music" (live) – 4:59
3. "Rollin' in My 5.0" (live full version) – 5:23
- US 12" maxi / CD maxi
1. "Rollin' in My 5.0" (studio edit) – 3:49
2. "Rollin' in My 5.0" (live full version) – 5:23
3. "Play That Funky Music" (live) – 5:00
4. "Rollin' in My 5.0" (studio full version) – 4:47

== Charts ==
Chart performance for "Rollin' in My 5.0"
Chart (1991)	Peak position
Australia (ARIA)	53
Germany (GfK)	70
UK Singles (OCC)	27
UK Airplay (Music Week)	38
UK Dance (Music Week)	38
