= I Love You (Vanilla Ice song) =

Single by Vanilla Ice

from the album To the Extreme
- Released: February 14, 1991
- Genre: Pop rap; R&B; soul
- Length: 5:10 (long version); 4:19 (radio mix); 3:46 (single edit)
- Label: SBK
- Songwriter: Vanilla Ice
- Producers: Gail "Sky" King, Kim Sharp

Vanilla Ice singles chronology
"Ice Ice Baby" (1990)	"I Love You" (1991)	"Rollin' in My 5.0" (1991)

Music video
- "I Love You" on YouTube

"I Love You" is a hip hop song written by American rapper Vanilla Ice, released in February 1991, by SBK Records, as the third single from his debut album, To the Extreme (1990). It peaked at numbers 52 and 63 on the US Billboard Hot 100 and Cash Box Top 100, and also saw chart entries in the UK (number 45), Germany (number 65), and New Zealand, where it peaked at number 30. The accompanying music video was directed by Michael Bay.

== Background ==
A departure from his usual style, "I Love You" is a ballad, and was released on Valentine's Day in 1991. The song was described by AllMusic writer Steve Huey as "a lyrically simplistic, overemoted ballad".

== Music video ==
A promotional video for the song, directed by Michael Bay, was produced by Mike Bodnarczuk. The music video was featured in an episode of Beavis and Butt-head, where the duo make fun of Ice and pan the video.

== Track listings ==
- CD Maxi – UK
1. "I Love You" (Long Version) – 5:10
2. "Stop That Train" – 4:30
3. "Ice Ice Baby" – 4:30
4. "I Love You" (Icetrumental) – 5:11
- Promo CD – US (I Love You/Stop That Train)
1. "I Love You" (Radio Mix) – 4:19
2. "Stop That Train" (Radio Mix) – 3:54
3. "I Love You" (Single Edit) – 3:46
4. "Stop That Train" (Long Version) – 4:28
5. "I Love You" (Long Version) – 5:10

== Charts ==
Chart (1991)	Peak position
Australia (ARIA)	103
Canada (RPM)	5
European Single Charts	17
Germany (Official German Charts)	65
Netherlands (Single Top 100)	39
New Zealand (Recorded Music NZ)	30
UK Singles (OCC)	45
UK Airplay (Music Week)	40
US Billboard Hot 100	52
US Cash Box Top 100	63
