= To the Extreme World Tour =

1991–1992 concert tour by Vanilla Ice

- Tour by Vanilla Ice
- Associated album: To the Extreme
- Start date: January 16, 1991
- End date: August 1, 1992
- Legs: 3
- No. of shows: 75

To the Extreme World Tour was the first headlining tour by American recording artist Vanilla Ice to promote his album To the Extreme. The tour consisted of three legs, starting on January 16, 1991, at Louisville and ending in Mexico City on August 1, 1992. On this tour, Vanilla Ice performed in arenas and theaters across the world including Australia, Latin America, North America and Europe. Despite the mixed reviews by the critics several shows were reported as sold out by the local media. The Party and Riff were selected as the opening act of some United States and Canada concerts until March 31, 1991. On March 6, 1991, he released Extremely Live with material recorded at Miami, Cleveland, Kissimee, Columbus and Tampa concerts.

== Reception ==
=== Critical reception ===
The reception of the tour was lukewarm. The Washington Post gave negative review to Ice stage performance comparing him to MC Hammer stating "while Hammer is acrobatic and tireless in concert, Ice was inelastic and tiresome" however praised the 3-D effects during the concert and the live instruments such as drums and saxophone that "helped spruce up the otherwise generic-sounding "Hooked" and "I Love You". In other hand, The Evening Sun gave a mixed review to the March 31, 1991 concert at Baltimore titled "Maybe, Ice wasn't nice, but he wasn't all bad, either".

=== Commercial reception ===
Most of the venues booked had a capacity between 2,500 and 10,000 seats and some were reported sold out. Around 3,200 were reported at Ottawa and Oklahoma concert. The concert at the Beacon Theater in New York was reported sold out. The concert in Ontario, Canada was also reported sold out packed with 5,500 fans. The Toronto Concert at the Auditorium de Verdun was reported sold out.

The concert of August 31, 1991 in Duluth, Minnesota, at the 2,500-seat Duluth Entertainment Convention Center Auditorium was abruptly canceled, while promoters claimed that they couldn't accommodate the roadshow's huge set, media reported that only 900 tickets were sold. In Auckland, New Zealand, the concert was cancelled due to poor tickets sales, however, an extra show was added in Melbourne, Australia due to the high demand. Ice also visited Sydney, Perth and Adelaide.

== Tour dates ==
Date	City	Country	Venue
January 16, 1991	Louisville	United States	Louisville Gardens
January 17, 1991	Columbus	United States	Veterans Memorial Auditorium
January 18, 1991	Pittsburgh	United States	Syria Mosque
January 19, 1991	Cleveland	United States	Cleveland Music Hall
January 20, 1991	Fairfax	United States	Patriot Center
January 24, 1991	Knoxville	United States	Knoxville Civic Auditorium
January 25, 1991	St. Louis	United States	American Theater
January 26, 1991	Omaha	United States	Omaha Music Hall
January 27, 1991	Tulsa	United States	Brady Theatre
January 30, 1991	Chicago	United States	Riviera Theatre
January 31, 1991	Royal Oak	United States	Royal Oak Music Theatre
February 1, 1991	Indianapolis	United States	Murat Theatre
February 2, 1991	Milwaukee	United States	Riverside Theater
February 3, 1991	Minneapolis	United States	Orpheum Theatre
February 6, 1991	New York	United States	Beacon Theatre
February 7, 1991	Philadelphia	United States	Tower Theatre
February 8, 1991	Hampton	United States	Hampton Coliseum
February 9, 1991	Charleston	United States	King Street Palace
February 10, 1991	Greenville	United States	Greenville Memorial Auditorium
February 12, 1991	Nashville	United States	Tennessee Performing Arts Center
February 13, 1991	Chattanooga	United States	UTC Arena
February 14, 1991	Atlanta	United States	Atlanta Civic Center
February 15, 1991	Birmingham	United States	Boutwell Auditorium
February 16, 1991	New Orleans	United States	Lakefront Arena
February 17, 1991	Little Rock	United States	Robinson Center Music Hall
February 20, 1991	Oklahoma City	United States	Civic Center Music Hall
February 21, 1991	San Antonio	United States	San Antonio Municipal Auditorium
February 22, 1991	Austin	United States	Long Center for the Performing Arts
February 23, 1991	Dallas	United States	Fair Park Coliseum
February 24, 1991	Houston	United States	The Summit
February 27, 1991	Miami	United States	James L. Knight Center
February 28, 1991	Tampa	United States	USF Sun Dome
March 1, 1991	Kissimmee	United States	Tupperware Center Theatre and Convention Complex
March 3, 1991	West Palm Beach	United States	West Palm Beach Auditorium
March 6, 1991	Johnstown	United States	War Memorial Arena
March 7, 1991	Buffalo	United States	Shea's Performing Arts Center
March 13, 1991	Albany	United States	Palace Theatre
March 14, 1991	Providence	United States	Providence Performing Arts Center
March 15, 1991	Springfield	United States	Paramount Theatre
March 16, 1991 (Note: MTV Spring Break)	Daytona Beach	United States	Daytona Beach Bandshell
March 18, 1991	Boston	United States	Orpheum Theatre
March 20, 1991	Montreal	Canada	Auditorium de Verdun
March 22, 1991	Toronto	Canada	Congress Theatre
March 23, 1991	Ottawa	Canada	Civic Centre
March 29, 1991	Marietta	United States	Marietta College
March 31, 1991	Baltimore	United States	Baltimore Arena
April 11, 1991	Hershey	United States	Hersheypark Arena
Europe
June 22, 1991	London	United Kingdom	Wembley Arena
North America
June 25, 1991	Mexico City	Mexico	Toreo de Cuatro Caminos
June 26, 1991	Guadalajara	Mexico	Plaza de Toros Nuevo Progreso
Europe
July 3, 1991	Munich	Germany	Circus Krone
July 4, 1991	Düsseldorf	Germany	Philipshalle
July 5, 1991	Berlin	Germany	Deutschalandhalle
July 6, 1991 (Note: The concert of july 6, 1991 Stadtpark Open Air 1991)	Hamburg	Germany	Stadtpak Freilchtbuhe
July 7, 1991	Frankfurt	Germany	Festhalle
July 8, 1991	Dubendorf	Switzerland	Sporthalle im Chreis
July 16, 1991	Genova	Italy	Palazzo dello Sport
July 19, 1991	Brussels	Belgium	Forest National
July 20, 1991	Rotterdam	Netherlands	Ahoy
North America
August 23, 1991	Ottawa	Canada	Lansdowne Park
August 24, 1991	Ottawa	Canada	Lansdowne Park
August 26, 1991	Detroit	United States	Joe Louis Arena
August 31, 1991	Grand Forks	United States	Chester Fritz Auditorium
September 6, 1991	Santa Clarita	United States	Magic Mountain Showcase Theatre
September 7, 1991	Santa Clara	United States	Great America
September 10, 1991	Puyallup	United States	Washington State Fair
September 11, 1991	Puyallup	United States	Washington State Fair
Latin America and Asia
September 23, 1991	Kuala Lumpur	Malaysia	Stadium Negara
September 25, 1991	Manila	Philippines	Aranata Coliseum
September 30, 1991	Singapore		Singapore Indoor Stadium
December 31, 1991	Grand Cayman	Cayman Islands	Treasure Island Resort Beach
February 20, 1992	Lima	Peru	Coliseo Eduardo Dibós
February 27, 1992	Buenos Aires	Argentina	Teatro Gran Rex
February 28, 1992	Buenos Aires	Argentina	Teatro Gran Rex
May 30, 1992	Santo Domingo	Dominican Republic	Renaissance Jaragua Hotel & Casino
July 2, 1992	Izmir	Turkey	Çeşme Açıkhava Tiyatrosu
July 29, 1992	Acapulco	Mexico	Mundo Imperial Forum
July 30, 1992	Puebla	Mexico	Estadio de béisbol Hermanos Serdán
July 31, 1992	Mexico CIty	Mexico	Toreo de Cuatro Caminos
August 1, 1992	Mexico CIty	Mexico	Toreo de Cuatro Caminos

== Cancelled shows ==
List of cancelled concerts, showing date, city, country, venue, and reason for cancellation
Date	City	Country	Venue	Reason
March 24, 1991	Ontario	Canada	Waterloo nightclub	Unknown
August 22, 1991	Toronto	Canada	Ontario Place Forum	Logistic Issues
August 30, 1991	Duluth	United States	Duluth Entertainment Convention Center Auditorium	Logistic Issues
September 21, 1991	Auckland	New Zealand		Poor Tickets Sales

== Notes ==
1. MTV Spring Break
2. The concert of july 6, 1991 Stadtpark Open Air 1991
