= Hard to Swallow =

Studio album by Vanilla Ice
- Released: October 20, 1998
- Studio: Indigo Ranch Studios (Malibu, California)
- Genres: Nu metal; rap metal
- Length: 49:46
- Labels: Republic, UD-53185
- Producer: Ross Robinson

Vanilla Ice chronology
Back 2 Back Hits (1998)	Hard to Swallow (1998)	The Best of Vanilla Ice (1999)

Singles from Hard to Swallow
- 1. "Too Cold" Released: October 1, 1998; 2. "S.N.A.F.U." Released: February 11, 1999

Hard to Swallow is the third studio album by American rapper Vanilla Ice. Released by Republic Records in 1998, the album was the first album Vanilla Ice recorded after a four-year hiatus following the 1994 release of Mind Blowin. Vanilla Ice intended the new musical direction found on the album as an attempt to move away from hip-hop and discard his former pop image. Hard to Swallow instead featured what he described as "skate rock", a fusion of heavy metal, punk rock and hip-hop. The album features appearances from Amen vocalist Casey Chaos, Bloodhound Gang vocalist Jimmy Pop, and Insane Poetry front man Cyco. Vanilla Ice employed a full band for the album's sessions, which included members from notable bands such as drummer Shannon Larkin (Ugly Kid Joe/Godsmack), keyboardist Scott Borland (Big Dumb Face/Lennon), guitarist Sonny Mayo (Snot/Sevendust), bassist Doug Ardito (Cellophane/Puddle of Mudd), and turntablist DJ Swamp (Beck/Ministry).

Vanilla Ice took an interest in the musical style found on Hard to Swallow while performing as a member of a Miami grunge band, and was able to develop this sound through a friendship with producer Ross Robinson, with whom he shared an interest in motocross racing. Robinson produced the album after being advised against working with Vanilla Ice. The album's darker lyrical subject matter developed from conversations in which Robinson encouraged him to write about his past. Subjects included Vanilla Ice's abusive childhood, drug addiction and struggles with fame. While the album revived Vanilla Ice's career, it received largely negative reviews and did not chart. The album sold nearly 100,000 copies.

== History ==
Vanilla Ice was briefly a member of a band called Pickin' Scabs, which he described as being "like a grunge band." He had wanted to perform more hip-hop-influenced rock music, but the band "didn't know how to play this sound that I was looking for."

Monte Lipman, a founder of Republic Records and former SBK Records promoter, told Vanilla Ice that Ross Robinson, who had worked with bands such as Korn, Limp Bizkit, Sepultura and Deftones, was interested in working with him. Vanilla Ice stated that he and Robinson were "totally clicking right off the bat" when it was discovered that they both shared an interest in motocross racing.

According to Robinson, others had attempted to persuade him not to produce the album. "People kept saying to me, 'It might hurt your name, it might hurt your reputation. I said, 'Then I'm doing it.' It's the most punk-rock thing you could do."

Vanilla Ice stated that "It's unbelievable how this whole thing just came about. I really believe that it was an action of God. God pushing my wave and riding it. And Ross is one of those people and Monte is one of those people that God put in front of me and I'm being blessed right now."

== Production ==
Initial publicity claimed that the album would feature guest appearances by Lenny Kravitz and members of Korn and the Bloodhound Gang. Only the latter band's lead vocalist, Jimmy Pop, appeared on the final album. "Freestyle" features an appearance by Cyco, a founding member of the influential horrorcore group Insane Poetry. Preceding the release of the album, executives at Republic Records compared Vanilla Ice's career direction to the revival of actor John Travolta as a result of the success of Pulp Fiction, and believed that Vanilla Ice would be similarly successful.

Drummer Shannon Larkin said of the album "I'm proud of that one. That was a killer record. Producer Ross Robinson is very demanding when it comes to drums in the studio. Everything had to be 110% for that guy, and I love him for that." Vanilla Ice stated of working with Robinson, "The vibe was totally so cool. We had the album finished in a month and a half because we kept the vibe."

== Musical and lyrical style ==
In the early stages of the album's development, it was promoted as an album of "high-energy hip-hop." Republic Records later described the album's musical style as "aggressive rock" in the stages preceding the album's release. Vanilla Ice referred to the album's musical style as "skate rock." The album's dark and thick sound fuses elements of heavy metal, punk rock and hip-hop. Vanilla Ice stated that "I wanted to express myself in a very intense way, and there was no way it was going to happen with a drum machine. Basically, I'm bored with drum machines and samples and stuff. With a band, they can build the energy around me." Many critics have noticed a similarity between the style of music present on Hard to Swallow and that of bands such as Korn and Limp Bizkit. Vanilla Ice stated that although he knew of the bands, he "didn't even listen to [...] any of them" before he made the album, and he was not trying to imitate the musical style of the bands. "It's just we have the same producer, and some of the guitars between that and Limp Bizkit are gonna sound similar. That's what happens when you've got the same guy producing them. [...] I had heard the Deftones more than any of them."

"Stompin' Through the Bayou" (sample)

The album features a noticeably darker sound and lyrical subject matter than Vanilla Ice's previous albums, such as To The Extreme and Mind Blowin. The album was described by CNN as a "shrill confessional" on which Vanilla Ice "flays his '80s persona, his fractured family and Attention Deficit Disorder, which he has." Vanilla Ice explained that the album "just comes out dark because that's the way I feel I've been treated" and that the album "wasn't intended to be so dark. I opened up to Ross and I told him a lot of things that happened to me in the past. It was like, really deep conversation, and he was like, you should write about that. And I was like, dude, I didn't want people to judge me for that. But he was right. It was like total therapy."

The subjects focused on in the album's lyrics include Vanilla Ice's abusive childhood and drug addiction. He stated that "I wrote 'Fuck Me' 'cause I know how I've been perceived. "I can look back at the whole Vanilla Ice thing, and it was played way out. It was just an image thing. I was always real to the music. But it built a huge hurdle for me to get over musically. A lot of people didn't even want to admit they bought a Vanilla Ice record." "Too Cold" is a rap rock remake of Vanilla Ice's biggest hit, "Ice Ice Baby". Vanilla Ice stated that he remade the song because "I wanted to let people know that I'm not running from anything. This is me. This is what I'm about. I think the music speaks for itself. If the music was whack, nobody'd even care to hear anything about no Vanilla Ice. I just think the music is so strong people are kinda comin' out of the closet. It's like, 'You know, hey, I bought it back in the day, and the new stuff is slammin'.' I think there's some hip-hop influenced, stage-diving, body piercing, tattooed white boys out there who are embracing this new sound." "Too Cold" was originally intended to be released as a hidden track or B-side.

== Reception ==
Professional ratings
Review scores
Source	Rating
AllMusic	2/5 stars
Entertainment Weekly	D−
Iowa State Daily	(favorable)
MSN	1.5/5 stars
New York Times	(unfavorable)
Rolling Stone	2/5 stars
The Rolling Stone Album Guide	3/5 stars
Wall of Sound	62/100

"Too Cold" became a radio hit in some markets. Reviews of the album were generally mixed to negative. A reviewer for the New Times in Los Angeles referred to the album as "stupid, exploitive [sic], derivative rap-metal by the man who once did nearly irreparable damage to hip-hop." Jon Pareles of The New York Times wrote that "If history is any guide, Vanilla Ice's adoption of rap-metal means that hard rock is about to move on." Richard Torres of Rolling Stone gave the album two out of five stars, writing that while "nothing, however, can redeem Ice's wack boasting," the album "isn't half-bad." The New Rolling Stone Album Guide gave the album three out of five stars. The Iowa State Daily called the album "the greatest pop culture comeback of all time". The album did not chart. The album appeared on The A.V. Club's list of the "Least Essential Albums of the '90s," at number 24 on Maxim's list of the "30 Worst Albums of All Time", and number 26 on Q's list of the "50 Worst Albums Ever!" Vanilla Ice released a follow-up album, Bi-Polar, in 2001, which continued his artistic and career direction.

== Track listing ==
All tracks are written by Rob Van Winkle, Ross Robinson, Ordito, Casey Chaos, Scott Borland, Shannon Larkin, Mayo, Holoman and Johnson.

No.	Title	Length
1.	"Living"	3:45
2.	"Scars"	4:56
3.	"Ecstasy"	0:09
4.	"Fuck Me" (featuring Casey Chaos)	4:32
5.	"Valley of Tears"	0:12
6.	"Zig Zag Stories"	5:26
7.	"Too Cold"	3:24
8.	"Prozac"	4:27
9.	"S.N.A.F.U." (featuring Jimmy Pop)	4:46
10.	"A.D.D." (featuring Casey Chaos)	5:14
11.	"Stompin' Through the Bayou"	3:24
12.	"The Horny Song"	4:33
13.	"Freestyle" (featuring Cyco of Insane Poetry, 2-Hype & C-Note)	4:58
Total length:		49:46

=== Sample credits ===
S.N.A.F.U.

- "The Big Beat" by Billy Squier

Freestyle

- "Powerhouse" by Raymond Scott

== Personnel ==
Band

- Vanilla Ice – lead vocals
- Shannon Larkin – drums
- Sonny Mayo – guitar
- Doug Ardito – bass
- Scott Borland – keyboards, bass
- DJ Swamp – scratches

Additional musicians

- Casey Chaos – guest vocals on "A.D.D." and "Fuck Me"
- Insane Poetry, C-Note, Jimmy Pop, and 2Hype – additional vocals

Production

- Ross Robinson – producer, mixing
- Chuck Johnson – recording engineer, mixing
- Rob Agnello – sound engineer
- Eddy Schreyer – mastering
- Gene Grimaldi – editing, assembly
