= Vanilla Ice Is Back! =

Studio album (of cover songs) by Vanilla Ice
- Released: November 4, 2008
- Genre: Hip-hop; rap rock
- Length: 54:12
- Label: Cleopatra
- Producer: Adam Hamilton

Vanilla Ice chronology
Platinum Underground (2005)	Vanilla Ice Is Back! (2008)	W.T.F. (Wisdom, Tenacity and Focus) (2011)

Professional ratings
Review scores
Source	Rating
Allmusic	1/5 stars
IGN	(3.7/10)
In Utah This Week	1.5/4 stars

Vanilla Ice Is Back! is a cover album by the rapper Vanilla Ice. Released in 2008 by Cleopatra Records, it is a cover album containing covers of several popular hip-hop tracks, as well as one reggae selection: "Buffalo Soldier", originally performed by Bob Marley.

== Production and release ==
Vanilla Ice chose most of the songs for the record, but he says he had no creative control over the production process. The album was first released as a digital download on November 4, 2008, and on digital compact disc on November 11, 2008.

The cover is modeled after that of Elvis Presley's 1960 album Elvis Is Back!.

== Reception ==
IGN reviewer Spence Abbott wrote: "From uninspired nu metal interpretations to thin voiced funk interpretations on down to the poor synth break beats, [the album] is an embarrassing endeavor that sounds like it should have stayed locked inside Ice's studio (or at the very least leaked on YouTube and passed off as a piss take)."

== Track listing ==
Vinyl side A
No.	Title	Original performer	Length
1.	"Ice Ice Baby 2008"	Vanilla Ice	4:16
2.	"You Dropped a Bomb on Me"	The Gap Band	4:45
3.	"Fight the Power"	Public Enemy	4:31
4.	"Jump Around"	House of Pain	3:14
5.	"Baby Got Back"	Sir Mix-a-Lot	4:20

Vinyl side B
No.	Title	Original performer	Length
6.	"You Gots to Chill"	EPMD	3:40
7.	"I Got It Made"	Special Ed	3:41
8.	"Buffalo Soldier"	Bob Marley	3:44
9.	"Treat 'Em Right"	Chubb Rock	4:45
10.	"Insane in the Brain"	Cypress Hill	3:46

CD bonus tracks
No.	Title	Original performer	Length
11.	"Ice Ice Baby (Rock Hero Mix)"	Vanilla Ice	4:10
12.	"Ice Ice Baby (Club Crasher Mix)"	Vanilla Ice	4:27
13.	"Ice Ice Baby (New Romantic Mix)"	Vanilla Ice	4:53

== Samples ==
Buffalo Soldier

- "Change the Beat (Female Version)" by Beside

Insane in the Brain

- "Hits From the Bong" by Cypress Hill
