= Under Pressure (Ice Ice Baby) =

Single by Jedward featuring Vanilla Ice

from the album Planet Jedward
- B-side: "Karaoke version"
- Released: 31 January 2010
- Recorded: January 2010
- Genre: Pop, hip hop
- Length: 3:44
- Label: Sony
- Songwriters: David Bowie, Queen, Vanilla Ice, Earthquake

Jedward singles chronology
"Under Pressure (Ice Ice Baby)" (2010)	"All the Small Things" (2010)

Vanilla Ice singles chronology
"Ninja Rap 2" (2007)	"Under Pressure (Ice Ice Baby)" (2010)	"Turn It Up" (2010)

"Under Pressure (Ice Ice Baby)" is the debut single by Irish pop duo Jedward. The song is a medley of "Under Pressure", originally recorded in 1981 by Queen and David Bowie, and the 1990 Vanilla Ice single "Ice Ice Baby". "Ice Ice Baby" originally sampled the bassline from "Under Pressure". Vanilla Ice also provides vocals for the track.

The song was released as a digital download in the UK on 31 January 2010, followed by a physical release on 15 February 2010. The song was also simultaneously released in Ireland. This is the duo's only single to be released on the Sony Music label. The physical release of the single included a double-sided poster and full lyrics. The single peaked at No. 1 on the Irish Singles Chart, followed by an entry at No. 2 in the UK Singles Chart.

== Track listing ==
1. "Under Pressure (Ice Ice Baby)" (Radio Edit) (featuring Vanilla Ice) — 3:41
2. "Under Pressure (Ice Ice Baby)" (Karaoke Version) (featuring Vanilla Ice) — 3:41

== Promotion ==
Jedward first performed the song on the sixth live show of the sixth series of The X Factor, while they were still contestants on the show. The first official performance of the song occurred on 20 January 2010, where Vanilla Ice joined the duo at the National Television Awards in London. The song had its first radio airplay on 24 January with performances on Friday Night with Jonathan Ross, The Chris Moyles Show, GMTV, This Morning, The Saturday Night Show and RTE1 following. Jedward were also scheduled to perform on the 5:19 show, however, pulled out due to contractual issues.

== Background ==
Vanilla Ice praised the twins. He stated: "I think they're great — I didn't know much about them until a couple of weeks ago. I checked them out on YouTube and I went 'no way', and after I got over the laugh, they invited me to come out." Louis Walsh said about the release: "Jedward really captured the public's imagination while on The X Factor. Love them or hate them, you can't deny that they were the talking point of the series. As 'Under Pressure' was the track that really catapulted the boys to fame, it seemed only fitting to release the song as their first single."

== Critical reception ==
Alex Fletcher of Digital Spy reviewed the song negatively, giving it an average 2/5, saying "Quite where Jedward go next remains to be seen — can they squeeze out an entire album of corny pop-rap covers?" However the BBC chart blog's Fraser McAlpine praised the single giving it five stars out of five, saying: "bottom line, pop music is about fun, and this is fun. WAY fun."

== Music video ==
The music video was released on 2 February 2010. It was shot in the Mill Lane Studios in London and the dance moves were choreographed by American choreographer Brian Friedman, who worked with the twins when they were on The X Factor. The video is directed by American music video director Dale "Rage" Resteghini.

The video features Jedward performing in front of a gigantic screen, displaying "JEDWARD" and "UNDER PRESSURE" as well as various words from the song lyrics. Jedward later also join a large dance routine with pyrotechnics. Vanilla Ice joins the twins in a later scene, performing in front of a graffiti design prepared by Thomas Dolan. At the end of the video, Vanilla Ice sprays the word "ICE" on the camera screen in red spray paint, then covers the entire picture in paint as the song fades out.

== Chart performance ==
On 5 February 2010, "Under Pressure" entered the Irish Singles Chart at number 1, following strong digital downloads. The following week, on 12 February, the single fell to number 2, following the release of the Helping Haiti "Everybody Hurts" single. However, on 19 February, the single climbed 1 place to resume its current peak of number 1. On 7 February, the song entered the UK Singles Chart at number 2, just missing out on the top spot behind "Fireflies" by Owl City. The following week, the single dropped 10 places to number 12. However, on 21 February, following the CD release, the single climbed 1 place to number 11.

== Charts ==
=== Weekly charts ===
Chart (2010)	Peak position
Ireland (IRMA)	1
Russian Airplay Chart	55
UK Singles (Official Charts Company)	2

=== Year-end charts ===
Chart (2010)	Position
Ireland (IRMA)	2
