= Extremely Live =

Live album by Vanilla Ice
- Released: May 28, 1991
- Recorded: 1991
- Venues: Knight Center (Miami, Florida); Tupperware (Kissimmee, Florida); Auditorium (West Palm Beach, Florida); Music Hall (Cleveland, Ohio); Veterans Memorial Auditorium (Columbus, Ohio); Syria Mosque (Pittsburgh, Pennsylvania); Sundome (Tampa, Florida)
- Genre: Hip hop
- Length: 72:33
- Label: SBK
- Producers: Vanilla Ice; Gail "Sky" King; DJ Earthquake; Khayree; George Anderson; Kim Sharp; Peter Loomis

Vanilla Ice chronology
To the Extreme (1990)	Extremely Live (1991)	Cool as Ice (1991)

Singles from Extremely Live
- 1. "Rollin' in My 5.0" Released: March 1, 1991; 2. "Satisfaction" Released: 1991; 3. "Road to My Riches" Released: 1991

Extremely Live is a live album by American rapper Vanilla Ice. It was released on May 28, 1991, via SBK Records. It was recorded at Knight Center in Miami, Tupperware in Kissimmee, Auditorium in West Palm Beach, Music Hall in Cleveland, Veterans Memorial Auditorium in Columbus, Syria Mosque in Pittsburgh, and Sundome in Tampa during the To the Extreme world tour, from January to March 1991. It was produced by Gail "Sky" King, DJ Earthquake, Peter Loomis, Khayree, Kim Sharp, and Vanilla Ice.

Released in 1991, it is the rapper's second major label release, after To the Extreme. The album contains material from Van Winkle's debut album, Hooked, as well as the new songs "Rollin' in My 5.0", "Road to My Riches", "Move" and "I Like It". The album peaked at number 30 on the Billboard 200.

== Reception ==
Professional ratings
Review scores
Source	Rating
AllMusic	1/5 stars
Robert Christgau	(dud)
Entertainment Weekly	D

David Browne of Entertainment Weekly gave the album a D, calling it "one of the most ridiculous albums ever released". Browne compared the album to The Best of Marcel Marceau, an album which consisted of two sides of silence opened by brief applause. According to Browne, Extremely Live "affords you the chance to hear inane stage patter [...] and unaccompanied drumming, during which, one assumes, Ice and his posse are onstage dancing". Robert Christgau gave the album a dud rating. AllMusic reviewer Steve Huey wrote that the album is "not so much awful as instantly forgettable".

== Track listing ==
Extremely Live track listing
No.	Title	Producer(s)	Length
1.	"Intro/Ice Is Workin' It"	Peter Loomis; DJ Earthquake; Gail "Sky" King; George Anderson; Vanilla Ice	4:37
2.	"Hooked"	Khayree	3:36
3.	"Stop That Train"	Vanilla Ice	3:02
4.	"Rollin' in My 5.0"	Gail "Sky" King; Vanilla Ice	5:20
5.	"Ice Ice Baby" (Miami Drop Mix)	DJ Earthquake; Vanilla Ice; Gail "Sky" King	9:20
6.	"Havin' a Roni"	Vanilla Ice	4:02
7.	"V.I.P. Posse One by One"	DJ Earthquake	8:52
8.	"Satisfaction"	Gail "Sky" King; Vanilla Ice	5:32
9.	"Life Is a Fantasy"	DJ Earthquake	2:28
10.	"Road to My Riches"	Gail "Sky" King; Vanilla Ice	4:18
11.	"I Love You"	Kim Sharp	5:56
12.	"Move"	DJ Earthquake	1:39
13.	"I Like It"	Gail "Sky" King; Vanilla Ice	5:07
14.	"Play That Funky Music"	Vanilla Ice	4:55
15.	"Satisfaction" (studio version)	Khayree; Vanilla Ice	3:46
Total length:			72:33

== Charts ==
Chart performance for Extremely Live
Chart (1991)	Peak position
Australian Albums (ARIA)	56
Canada Top Albums/CDs (RPM)	46
German Albums (Offizielle Top 100)	49
UK Albums (Official Charts)	35
US Billboard 200	30

== Certifications ==
Certifications for Extremely Live
Region	Certification	Certified units/sales
Canada (Music Canada)	Gold	50,000^{^}
United States (RIAA)	Gold	500,000^{^}
^{^} Shipments figures based on certification alone.
