= Bi-Polar (Vanilla Ice album) =

- Skabz cover

Studio album by V-Ice
- Released: October 23, 2001
- Recorded: 1999–01
- Studios: Luminous Sound, Dallas, Texas and Sound City Studios, Los Angeles, California
- Genres: Nu metal; rap metal; hip hop
- Length: 72:12
- Label: Liquid 8
- Producer: Ice

Vanilla Ice chronology
The Best of Vanilla Ice (1999)	Bi-Polar (2001)	Platinum Underground (2005)

Bi-Polar
- Bomb Tha System cover

Singles from Bi-Polar
- 1. "Nothing Is Real" Released: September 3, 2001; 2. "Get Your Ass Up" Released: January 27, 2002; 3. "Tha Weed Song" Released: May 25, 2002; 4. "Hot Sex" Released: October 31, 2002; 5. "Elvis Killed Kennedy" Released: December 19, 2002

Bi-Polar is the fourth studio album by Vanilla Ice. Released by Ultrax Records, it is the rapper's second independent release, after Hooked. The song "Unbreakable" was remade for Dance Dance Revolution II as "Still Unbreakable", with additional verses from Vanilla Ice himself and production from Konami in-house artist Des-ROW. As of 2002, the album sold 10,645 copies in the United States.

== Production ==
The album was initially planned as a double album consisting of one disc of rock music (Skabz) and one disc of hip hop music (Bomb Tha System). Before its release, it was decided that the two parts of the album would be released on one disc, with each part labeled. Each side of the booklet features a different cover for each part. Skabz features appearances from heavy metal music figures such as former Slipknot guitarist Josh "Gnar" Brainard, Roy Mayorga, and Billy Milano. Bomb Tha System notably features appearances from Insane Poetry's Cyco, Chuck D (of Public Enemy fame), the Insane Clown Posse, and Wu-Tang Clan affiliate La the Darkman. In the initial publicity for the album, Vanilla Ice claimed that the album would feature a guest appearance from Lenny Kravitz.

Although Vanilla Ice is credited as "V-Ice" and "Ice" on the album, there was never any intent to change his stage name. The performer is quoted as saying "people are asking me that question [...] there's no name change. I'm proud of it and I'm not trying to run from anything or hide from anything."

== Lyrics ==
On "Hip Hop Rules", Vanilla Ice praises what he loves about hip hop while overlooking his career. "Dirty South" and "Tha Weed Song" are about marijuana. "Molton", "Nothing is Real" and "Primal Side" deal with Vanilla Ice's mortality and thoughts of death, while "Elvis Killed Kennedy" and "Hate" criticize the current condition the world is in.

A lot of the songs feature a mixture of explicit and humorous lyrics such as "Exhale", while songs like "Insane Killas" could be described as horrorcore hip hop. The hardcore hip hop songs on the album, like "Detonator", "O.K.S." and "Unbreakable", focus on Ice's rhyming skills and flow.

Although having mentioned him a couple of times in past interviews, Bi-Polar features Vanilla Ice's only musical response to Eminem who has been referencing him since the 90s and in almost every record since The Slim Shady LP (1999). In "Exhale", Ice claims that Marshall Mathers' initials stand for Mini-Me, which is also a reference to the Austin Powers franchise because the first film also referenced Vanilla Ice. Ice remarked that the song was just a joke and that he has no real beef with Eminem. Eminem did however name-drop Vanilla Ice again on The Eminem Show (2002), mentioning being reborn as his son, and in the film 8 Mile (2002).

== Release ==
Five singles were released, "Nothing is Real","Get Your Ass Up", "Tha Weed Song", "Hot Sex" & "Elvis Killed Kennedy". Bomb tha System was reissued under the title Hot Sex on May 26, 2002, with alternate artwork depicting a woman in revealing clothing alongside Vanilla Ice.

According to a Sony BMG executive, sales of Bi-Polar were "not bad...for Vanilla Ice. That's pretty respectable. Seriously."

== Reception ==
Professional ratings
Review scores
Source	Rating
AllMusic	1.5/5 stars
The Rolling Stone Album Guide	1/5 stars

The album was universally panned by critics. Bradley Torreano of Allmusic greatly disliked the album, calling it "wildly uneven and at times hilariously bad". Torreano referred to the album's heavy metal-influenced songs as being "terribly generic" and derivative of bands such as Korn and Deftones. Torreano praised the production of the hip hop songs, but described their lyrics as "boring and simplistic", and felt that the inclusion of the phone messages at the end of the album was not necessary. Torreano called "Elvis Killed Kennedy" "the best song on the album" and described it as "a sadly rare example of the talent that Chuck D still has".

== Track listing ==
Skabz
No.	Title	Producer(s)	Length
1.	"Introduction"		0:11
2.	"Nothing Is Real" (Ice, Train, Feat. Josh Brainard, Roy Mayorga, Jason Mendelson)	Ice	4:26
3.	"Molton" (Ice, "T" Tim McMurtrie, Chris "Hitman" Antonopoulos)	Ice	3:13
4.	"Mudd Munster" (Ice, Feat. Billy Milano, Josh Brainard, Roy Mayorga, Jason Mendelson)	Ice	3:24
5.	"Exhale" (Ice, Feat. "T" Tim McMurtrie, Billy Milano)	"T" Tim McMurtrie, Steve Evetts and Ice	2:56
6.	"Hate" (Ice)	Ice	5:24
7.	"Primal Side" (Ice, Feat. Josh Brainard, Roy Mayorga, Jason Mendelson)	Ice	5:23
8.	"I Know" (Ice, "T" Tim McMurtrie, Rod J)	"T" Tim McMurtrie, Steve Evetts and Ice	4:43
Total length:			29:42

Bomb Tha System
No.	Title	Producer(s)	Length
9.	"Hip Hop Intro"		0:10
10.	"Hip Hop Rules" (Ice, Train, Feat. La The Darkman)	Ice	4:32
11.	"O.K.S." (Ice, Feat. Cyco, DJ Street)	Ice	3:40
12.	"Dirty South" (Ice, Zero, Feat. Zeno, Rod-J, Calico)	Ice and Zero	3:42
13.	"Hot Sex" (Ice, Bob Kakaha, REM)	Ice	4:50
14.	"Unbreakable" (Ice, Feat. La Tha Darkman)	Ice	3:09
15.	"Detonator" (Ice, Feat. Train)	Ice	3:38
16.	"Elvis Killed Kennedy" (Ice, Feat. Mista Chuck A.K.A. Chuck D, Rahan)	Ice	3:40
17.	"Insane Killas" (Ice, Train, Feat. Insane Clown Posse, La Tha Darkman, Zeno)	Ice and Zeno	5:02
18.	"Tha Weed Song" (Ice, Zeno, Blu, Feat. Rahan)	Ice	5:15
19.	"Get Your Ass Up" (Ice, Feat. Pearla, Zeno)	Ice	2:53
20.	"Crash And Burn" (Phone Message—Ross Robinson)		0:47
21.	"Vampiro" (Phone Message—ICP)		0:13
22.	"MC & Slasher" (Phone Message—Jeremy McGrath, Victor Sheldon)		0:10
23.	"Anthropology 101" (Phone Message—Zero)		0:15
24.	"White Trash" (Ice—Quote From Cape Fear)		0:26
Total length:			42:29

== Samples ==
"Hot Sex"

- "Im Nin'Alu" by Ofra Haza

"Elvis Killed Kennedy"

- "Best of My Love" by The Emotions
