= W.T.F. (Wisdom, Tenacity and Focus) =

Studio album by Vanilla Ice
- Released: August 30, 2011
- Recorded: 2008–2010
- Genres: Hip hop; techno; country
- Length: 51:26
- Label: Radium

Vanilla Ice chronology
Vanilla Ice Is Back! (2008)	W.T.F. (Wisdom, Tenacity and Focus) (2011)

Singles from W.T.F. (Wisdom, Tenacity And Focus)
- 1. "Turn It Up" Released: July 4, 2010; 2. "Born on Halloween" Released: October 9, 2010; 3. "Rock Star Party" Released: April 26, 2011

W.T.F. (Wisdom, Tenacity and Focus), also known as W.T.F. or just WTF, is the sixth studio album by American rapper Vanilla Ice. Scheduled for a 2009 release, it was officially released as a digital download on August 30, 2011, through Radium Records, executive produced by Vanilla Ice, Nick DeTomaso and Mark Mehwald.

In contrast to some previous releases by Van Winkle, the album included notable active collaborators Cowboy Troy and the Insane Clown Posse, both artists that Van Winkle has been an open fan of. It also includes songs with a variety of genre influences, ranging from straightforward hip hop to rap rock to country music and others. The album sold just 1,000 copies in the United States, according to Nielsen Music.

== History ==
The album was first announced on Robert Van Winkle's Twitter account under the title Yesterday Is History, Tomorrow Is A Mystery, scheduled for an initial 2009 release on StandBy Records. The album was completed in February 2010, and it was announced that its new title would be WTF, an initialism for Wisdom, Tenacity and Focus. On May 17, 2010, the album's track listing was revealed through Van Winkle's official website. The album was officially released on Radium Records as a digital download through Amazon MP3 and iTunes on August 30, 2011. The album has since been released on CD by Radium Records following the success of his reality show The Vanilla Ice Project.

== Music ==
The album touches upon diverse musical genres, including hip hop, acoustic, country and techno. It features guest appearances by Violent J of Insane Clown Posse and Cowboy Troy.

== Track listing ==
All tracks are written by Vanilla Ice.

No.	Title	Writer(s)	Length
1.	"Turn It Up"	Vanilla Ice and Rod-J	3:24
2.	"Rock Star Party"	Vanilla Ice	2:38
3.	"Good Times" (featuring Cowboy Troy)	Vanilla Ice, Rod-J and Cowboy Troy	4:05
4.	"Cadillac Ninjaz"	Vanilla Ice	3:13
5.	"Nightmare Disco"	Vanilla Ice	3:03
6.	"Born on Halloween" (featuring Insane Clown Posse)	Vanilla Ice and Violent J	4:05
7.	"Wit Dat"	Vanilla Ice	4:05
8.	"Bought & Sold" (featuring Ruckus)	Vanilla Ice and La tha Darkman	3:45
9.	"My Way" (featuring Ruckus)	Vanilla Ice	3:37
10.	"5446"	Vanilla Ice	3:08
11.	"Oh Momma"	Vanilla Ice	1:36
12.	"Impossible Mission"	Vanilla Ice and Rod-J	2:23
13.	"Hooked" (Unplugged)	Vanilla Ice and DeShay	1:55
14.	"King of the Daredevils (skit)"	Evil Knievel	2:09
15.	"Da Ha Da Ha" (featuring Cowboy Troy)	Cowboy Troy	5:05
16.	"Bought & Sold" (Brandon Bishop remix)	Vanilla Ice and La tha Darkman	3:15
Total length:			51:26

== Samples ==
Born on Halloween

- "This Is Halloween" by the cast of The Nightmare Before Christmas

5446

- "54-46 That's My Number" by Toots & the Maytals

Oh Momma

- "Mammas Don't Let Your Babies Grow Up to Be Cowboys" by Ed Bruce
