= Teenage Mutant Ninja Turtles II: The Secret of the Ooze: The Original Motion Picture Soundtrack =

Soundtrack album by Various Artists
- Released: March 26, 1991
- Genres: Pop; hip hop; techno; Latin
- Length: 41:32
- Label: SBK
- Producer: Pat Lucas

Teenage Mutant Ninja Turtles II: The Secret of the Ooze: The Original Motion Picture Soundtrack is the soundtrack to the 1991 New Line Cinema film Teenage Mutant Ninja Turtles II: The Secret of the Ooze. Released by SBK Records on March 26, 1991, It features the song "Ninja Rap" by Vanilla Ice, who made a cameo appearance in the film. Songs like "This World" by Magnificent VII and "Back to School" by Fifth Platoon feature various virtuous themes in their lyrics such as world peace, staying in school, and environmentalism.

== Reception ==
Professional ratings
Review scores
Source	Rating
Allmusic	2.5/5 stars
Select	(1/5)

In 1991, Select gave the album a rating of one out of five, stating the album "is despicable. Every kind of dance music has been drugged and sodomised into submission until it becomes anodyne and trite enough to accompany the weakest of children's parties."

== Track listing ==
No.	Title	Writer(s)	Artist	Length
1.	"Awesome (You Are My Hero)"	Danny Poku; Manuela Kamosi	Ya Kid K	4:04
2.	"Ninja Rap"	Vanilla Ice; Earthquake	Vanilla Ice	3:45
3.	"Find the Key to Your Life"	Cathy Dennis; David Morales	Cathy Dennis featuring David Morales	4:42
4.	"Moov!"	Karen Bernod; Pierre Salandy; Winston Jones	Tribal House	5:15
5.	"(That's Your) Consciousness"	Charlie Midnight; Dan Hartman; John Du Prez	Dan Hartman	4:10
6.	"This World"	Mickey Mahoney; Rosano Martinez; Troy Duncombe	Magnificent VII	3:56
7.	"Creatures of Habit"	Renée Geyer; Steve Harvey	Spunkadelic	4:02
8.	"Back to School"	Fifth Platoon	Fifth Platoon	4:39
9.	"Cowabunga"	Du Prez	Orchestra on the Half Shell	3:29
10.	"Tokka and Rahzar: Monster Mix"	Du Prez	Orchestra on the Half Shell	3:58
Total length:				41:32

== Charts ==
Chart (1990)	Peak position
Canada Top Albums/CDs (RPM)	30
US Billboard 200	30

== Certifications ==
Region	Certification	Certified units/sales
Canada (Music Canada)	Gold	50,000^{^}
United States (RIAA)	Gold	500,000^{^}
^{^} Shipments figures based on certification alone.

== Notes ==
- The album version of '"Ninja Rap" has a higher tempo than the film version.
- The album version of "Awesome (You Are My Hero)" omits the chorus' background vocals heard during the film's end credits.
- An arranged instrumental version of "(That's Your) Consciousness" is played over the film's opening credits.
