= Vanilla Ice =

American rapper (born 1967)

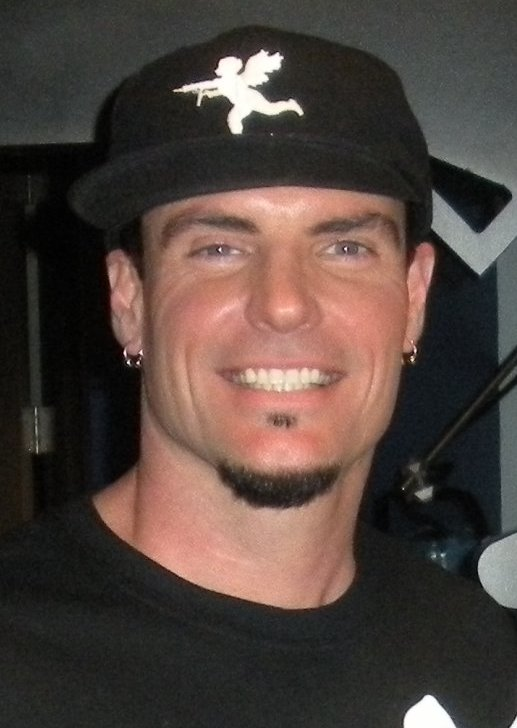
- Vanilla Ice in 2010

Background information
- Born: Robert Matthew Van Winkle; October 31, 1967 (age 59); Dallas, Texas, U.S.
- Origin: Dallas, Texas, U.S. Miami, Florida, U.S.
- Genres: Hip-hop; rap rock; nu metal; rap metal
- Occupations: Rapper; actor; record producer; singer; dancer; television host
- Years active: 1985–present
- Labels: Ichiban; SBK; EMI; Republic; Universal; Liquid 8; Ultrax; Cleopatra; Radium; Psychopathic
- Website: www.vanillaice.com

Robert Matthew Van Winkle (born October 31, 1967), known professionally as Vanilla Ice, is a rapper, singer, actor, dancer and television host. Born in Dallas and raised in Miami, he was the first solo white American rapper to achieve commercial success, following the 1990 release of his best-known hit "Ice Ice Baby". (Note: The white Austrian rapper Falco preceded Vanilla Ice by nine years with the 1981 song "Der Kommissar" which was described by Grunge.com as "for all intents and purposes, a rap song." "Der Kommisar" peaked at number 22 on the US Rock Airplay chart in April 1983.) He is credited with breaking down racial barriers in rap and hip-hop for future white rappers, most notably Eminem.

Ice released his debut album, Hooked, on the independent Ichiban Records before signing a contract with SBK Records, a record label of the EMI Group, which released a reformatted version under the title To the Extreme; it became the fastest-selling hip-hop album of all time and "Ice Ice Baby" was the first hip-hop single to top the Billboard Hot 100. Followed by the live album Extremely Live (1991), Ice made a cameo appearance on the film Teenage Mutant Ninja Turtles II: The Secret of the Ooze (1991) where he performed "Ninja Rap", which he co-wrote. He was soon offered and starred in his own film, Cool as Ice (1991), which included the single "Cool as Ice (Everybody Get Loose)" with Naomi Campbell; the film itself was a box office failure.

His fast rise in popularity was quickly marred by media controversies about his background. Ice later regretted his business arrangements with SBK, who had also published fabricated biographical information without his knowledge. Ice's second studio album, Mind Blowin' (1994), featured a major image change but was commercially unsuccessful. Following rap rock performances in the underground scene and playing in a local grunge band, Ice released the dark nu metal album Hard to Swallow (1998), followed by the independently released Bi-Polar (2001) and Platinum Underground (2005).

In the 2000s, Ice began appearing on television reality shows including The Surreal Life. In 2010, Ice began hosting The Vanilla Ice Project on DIY Network which ran for nine seasons until 2019. In 2022, he started another home improvement television program, The Vanilla Ice Home Show. He is also involved in motocross racing and real estate.

== Early life ==
Robert Matthew Van Winkle was born in Dallas, Texas, on October 31, 1967. He has never known his biological father; he was given the family name of the man his mother was married to at the time of his birth. When Van Winkle was four, his mother divorced. Afterward, he grew up moving between Dallas and Miami, where his new stepfather worked at a car dealership. Van Winkle was affected by hip-hop at an early age, saying "It's a very big passion of mine because I love poetry. I was just heavily influenced by that whole movement and it's molded me into who I am today." Between the ages of 13 and 14, Van Winkle practiced breakdancing, which led to his friends nicknaming him "Vanilla", as he was the only one in the group who was not black. Although he disliked the nickname, it stuck. Shortly afterward, Van Winkle started battle rapping at parties and because of his rhymes, his friends started calling him "MC Vanilla". However, when he became a member of a breakdance troupe, Van Winkle's stage name was "Vanilla Ice" combining his nickname "Vanilla" with one of his breakdance moves, "The Ice". When Ice's stepfather was offered a better job in Carrollton, Texas, he moved back to Texas with his mother. When Ice was not learning to ride motorbikes, he was dancing as a street performer with his breakdancing group, now called The Vanilla Ice Posse. Ice wrote "Ice Ice Baby" at the age of 16, basing its lyrics on a weekend he had with friend and disc jockey D-Shay in South Florida. The lyrics describe Ice and Shay on a drug run that ends in a drive-by shooting while praising Ice's rhyming skills. He attended R. L. Turner High School.

== Career ==
=== Early career (1985–1989) ===
In 1985, he was focusing all of his energy on motocross, winning three championships. After breaking his ankle during a race, Ice was not interested in racing professionally for some time, using his spare time to perfect his dance moves and creating his own while his ankle was healing. Ice used his beatboxing and breakdancing skills as a street performer with his friends at local malls during this time. One evening he visited City Lights, a South Dallas nightclub, where he was dared to go on stage by his friend Squirrel during an open-mic. He won the crowd over and was asked by City Lights manager John Bush if he wanted to perform regularly, which he accepted. Ice would be joined on stage by his disc jockeys D-Shay and Zero, as well as Earthquake, the local disc jockey at City Lights. The Vanilla Ice Posse or The V.I.P. would also perform with Ice on stage. As a performer for City Lights, Ice opened up for N.W.A, Public Enemy, The D.O.C., Tone Lōc, 2 Live Crew, Paula Abdul, Sinbad and MC Hammer.

In January 1987, Ice was stabbed five times during a scuffle outside of City Lights. After spending ten days in the hospital, Ice signed a contract with the owner of City Lights, Tommy Quon, and his management company, Ultrax. Two years later, Ice would open for EPMD, Ice-T, Stetsasonic, and Sir Mix-A-Lot on the Stop the Violence Tour. Quon saw commercial potential in Ice's rapping and dancing skills. Buying studio time with Quon's earnings from City Lights, they recorded songs that had been perfected on stage by Ice and his acquaintances with various producers, including Khayree. The two year production was distributed by an independent record company called Ichiban Records in 1989. "Play That Funky Music" was released as the album's first single, with "Ice Ice Baby" appearing as the B-side. Tommy Quon personally sent out the single to various radio stations around the U.S., but the single was seldom played and when it was, it did not get the reaction Quon was hoping for. When disc jockey Darrell Jaye in Georgia played "Ice Ice Baby" instead of the single's A-side, the song gained a quick fanbase and other radio stations followed suit. Quon financed $8,000 for the production of a music video for "Ice Ice Baby", which received heavy airplay by The Box, increasing public interest in the song.

=== Mainstream success (1990–1992) ===
On the basis of Ice's good looks and dance moves, Public Enemy tried to convince their producer, Hank Shocklee, to sign Ice to Def Jam, but Ice later signed a contract with SBK Records in 1990. During MC Hammer's Please Hammer Don't Hurt 'Em World Tour, Ice served as an opening act. SBK remixed and re-recorded Hooked under the title To the Extreme. The reissue contained new artwork and music. According to Ice, SBK paid him to adopt a more commercial, conventional appearance. This led Ice to later regret his business agreements with SBK.

To the Extreme became the fastest selling hip-hop album of all time, spending sixteen weeks at No. 1 on the Billboard 200 and selling eleven million copies. SBK Record executive Monte Lipman stated that he received calls from radio stations reporting over 200 phone calls requesting "Ice Ice Baby". SBK wanted Ice on the road as soon as possible. MC Hammer, an old acquaintance from his club days, had Ice on as an opening act on his tour. Reviews of To the Extreme were mixed. Entertainment Weekly reviewer Mim Udovitch gave the album a B, citing "Ice Ice Baby", "Play That Funky Music", "Dancin'" and "It's a Party" as the album's highlights. Robert Christgau gave the album a C− rating, writing that Ice's "suave sexism, fashionably male supremacist rather than dangerously obscene, is no worse than his suave beats". Criticizing the technique and style of Vanilla Ice, Allrovi reviewer Steve Huey wrote:

Ice's mic technique is actually stronger and more nimble than MC Hammer's, and he really tries earnestly to show off the skills he does have. Unfortunately, even if he can keep a mid-tempo pace, his flow is rhythmically stiff, and his voice has an odd timbre; plus, he never seems sure of the proper accent to adopt. He's able to overcome those flaws somewhat in isolated moments, but they become all too apparent over the course of an entire album.

==== Media image ====
In late 1990, Ice began an eight-month relationship with Madonna, and appeared in photographs for her book, Sex. In the height of Ice's popularity, SBK licensed a 12" doll which was made by THQ. In January 1991, he was the musical guest on Saturday Night Live. Ice branched out into the film industry with an appearance in the film Teenage Mutant Ninja Turtles II: The Secret of the Ooze, which he later called "one of the coolest experiences" of his career. Ice was very secretive about his personal life, with the intention of protecting his family. When a Dallas Morning News reporter asked Ice what his mother's profession was, he replied, "None of your fucking business." In an attempt to rectify this, his former label wrote a fake biography in his name and tried to pass it off as his official life story without his knowledge. While on tour in 1991, Ice found out that SBK had instigated the publication of the biography which detailed false biographical information, including claims that he had attended school with Luther Campbell, and exaggerating his living conditions in Miami, which Ice later had to debunk by himself.

==== Suge Knight incident ====
Following the success of "Ice Ice Baby", record producer Suge Knight and two bodyguards arrived at The Palm in West Hollywood, where Ice was eating. After shoving Ice's bodyguards aside, Knight and his own bodyguards sat down in front of Ice, staring at him before finally asking "How you doin'?" Similar incidents were repeated on several occasions. Eventually, Knight showed up at Ice's hotel suite on the fifteenth floor of the Bel Age Hotel, accompanied by a member of the Los Angeles Raiders football team. According to Ice, Knight took him out on the balcony by himself, and implied that he would throw him off the balcony unless he signed the publishing rights to the song over to Knight; Knight used Ice's money to help fund Death Row Records.

==== Live album, Cool as Ice, and tours ====
Ice's second major release was the live album Extremely Live, released in March 1991. The album was a live recording during Vanilla Ice's performance in Miami during his To The Extreme World Tour. Premiering new songs like "Rollin' in My 5.0", "Road To My Riches" and "Satisfaction", the album peaked at No. 30 on the Billboard 200, but it received mainly negative reviews. Entertainment Weekly reviewer David Browne called it "one of the most ridiculous albums ever released", comparing it to The Best of Marcel Marceau, an album which consisted of two sides of silence opened by brief applause. According to Browne, Extremely Live "affords you the chance to hear inane stage patter [...] and unaccompanied drumming, during which, one assumes, Ice and his posse are onstage dancing." Monte Lipman later stated that SBK only released the live disc to make more money from Ice's fame. In April 1991, Ice began to film the SBK produced Cool as Ice, in which he played a leading role.

Cool as Ice opened on October 18, 1991, in 393 theaters in the United States, grossing $638,000, ranking at No. 14 among the week's new releases. Reviews of the film were negative. Film website Rotten Tomatoes, which compiles reviews from a wide range of critics, gives the film a score of 8%. Ice received a Golden Raspberry Award for Worst New Star. SBK stated that they overexposed Ice and Ice decided to stop taking their business advice, as well as distancing himself from the image that SBK was trying to create for him. In late 1991, Ice appeared in the Circus of the Stars and Sideshow, driving his motorcycle through a wall of fire. While his fame in the United States had severely dropped, Ice continued touring in 1992, playing in South America, Europe, Australia and Asia, and premiering new songs like "Get Loose", "The Wrath", "Now & Forever", "Where the Dogs At? (All Night Long)", "Minutes of Power" and "Iceman Party". After a performance in Acapulco, the city honored Ice with a medal that represented "all the respect and admiration to [Ice's] music and to [him] as an artist from the Mexican people". Ice also served as a spokesperson for Nike and Coca-Cola throughout 1991 and 1992.

=== Mind Blowin, music break and drug abuse (1993–1996) ===
In 1993, Ice toured Eastern Europe again and premiered songs off his upcoming album in St. Petersburg, Russia in front of President Boris Yeltsin. After almost non-stop touring for the previous three years, Ice took a break from music and began competing in jet skiing, as well as resuming Motocross racing. After becoming more interested with the Rastafari movement, Ice became a vegetarian, grew dreadlocks and talked more openly about smoking cannabis. Ice then began work on his next album, although by this time he received less publicity and faded from the public spotlight. On March 22, 1994, Ice released his second studio album, Mind Blowin'. Reviews were unfavorable. Entertainment Weekly reviewer James Bernard called the album "more clunky than funky". Allrovi reviewer Stephen Thomas Erlewine wrote that "There isn't a single moment that establishes a distinct musical identity, and the whole thing is rather embarrassing."

At around this time, Ice began using ecstasy, cocaine and heroin. During periods of heavy drug use, Ice received many tattoos from artist acquaintances. According to Ice, he "was in [his] binge days. [He] didn't even realize how many [he] was getting". Ice attempted suicide with a heroin overdose on July 4, 1994, but was revived by his friends. After being revived, Ice decided that it was time to change his lifestyle. As a symbol of his attempt to begin anew, he got a tattoo of a leaf on his stomach. After expanding his Mind Blowin tour overseas in 1995, Ice sold his estate in California and took a break from music, rather focusing on motocrossing and jet skiing in Florida. By the summer, Ice was the world's No. 6-ranked sit-down jet ski racer, competing nearly every weekend and earning a Kawasaki sponsorship.

Uncertain about his future career, Ice studied real estate and started working on the side renovating and selling houses. In late 1995, he set up a recording studio in Miami and joined a grunge band, Pickin Scabz. The name was set to reflect Ice's career, and how he was healing from his suicide attempt, and that he was now "picking up the pieces". In 1996, longtime associate and friend Monte Lipman signed Ice for Universal Republic Records. He did guest vocals with no stage name for the song "Boom" by Bloodhound Gang on their CD One Fierce Beer Coaster.

=== Rock era (1997–2001) ===
Ice later developed a friendship with producer Ross Robinson, who had become known for producing music by Deftones, Korn, Limp Bizkit and Sepultura. Robinson and Ice shared an interest in motocross racing. Monte Lipman hoped that Robinson would produce a new Vanilla Ice album. According to Robinson, others had attempted to discourage him from working with Ice, saying it might hurt his reputation. Rather than being dissuaded, Robinson was encouraged by their reticence and agreed to work with Ice. In an interview, Robinson stated, "It's the most punk-rock thing you could do." Despite not being happy with his old image, Ice stated that he never had a problem with his older music. He decided against changing his stage name, as he felt no need to run from his past, despite being uneasy with some of it, and started performing again, booking a hundred shows a year.

Ice's third studio album, Hard to Swallow, featured a darker sound and lyrics than Ice's previous work, as well as various mixtures of different styles of hip-hop and hard rock, which garnered media attention. Ice attracted a whole new audience when he started touring again, some who were even unfamiliar with his more mainstream sound. Reviews were generally negative; Jon Pareles of The New York Times wrote, "The most earnest new song, Scars, condemns an abusive father. The sentiments would sound more genuine if Korn hadn't gotten there first." Richard Torres of Rolling Stone gave the album two out of five stars, writing that while "nothing, however, can redeem Ice's wack boasting," the album "isn't half-bad." In The New Rolling Stone Album Guide, Rob Kemp gave the album three out of five stars, writing that it contained Ice's "most convincing music". In promotion of Hard to Swallow, Ice toured with a seven-piece live band which included future Weezer bassist Scott Shriner. The band opened with rock-oriented material from Hard to Swallow and concluded with older hip-hop songs. The setlist also included "Power", based upon Led Zeppelin's "Immigrant Song". Ice said that writing the songs and performing them were like therapy, as he had tried to hide his anger when making his older songs but Robinson was the first producer who told him to use it to create.

Vanilla Ice was a member of the softball team The Hip Hop Stars alongside Dr. Dre, Snoop Dogg and Method Man in a 1999 game shown on MTV Rock N' Jock. Later in 1999, MTV asked Vanilla Ice to join their cast to "retire" the music video for "Ice Ice Baby" on the MTV special 25 Lame, in which Ice himself was asked to destroy the video's master tape. When Ice was given a baseball bat, he ended up destroying not only the film but the show's entire set as well. In 2001, DJ ReAnimator remixed "Ice Ice Baby" with Vanilla Ice re-doing his vocals for the track. Ice Ice Baby 2001 was released as a single and music video for the European market, spawning a wave of new overseas interest in Vanilla Ice.

Having attracted a following outside of his former mainstream audience, Ice began recording independently, despite still being signed to Universal. During a recording session, Ice met the all-female American hard rock band from Southern California, Betty Blowtorch. Bianca Halstead bonded with Ice and asked if he wanted to contribute a rap interlude to their track Size Queen. On Ice's collaboration with the band, lead vocalist and bassist Halstead was quoted saying, "I asked him if he could rap over [the track] and he said he can rap over anything. And he could!" Per his stepfather's request, Ice started working with his former manager Tommy Quon again. While hoping to re-create some of the magic that they worked hard on in the early 1990s, Ice denied any interest in trying to become big again, stating that his only passion was music, not fame.

In May 2000, Ice wrestled in a match promoted by Juggalo Championshit Wrestling, filling in for Insane Clown Posse member Shaggy 2 Dope, who had been injured during a match. MTV News reported that Insane Clown Posse would make an appearance on Ice's next album, tentatively titled Bomb Tha System. In July 2001, Ice performed at the second Gathering of the Juggalos. On October 23, 2001, Ice released the album Bi-Polar. Initially conceived as a double album consisting of one disc of rock music (Skabz) and one disc of hip-hop music (Bomb Tha System), both parts were released on one disc. The album also featured La the Darkman, Perla, Insane Poetry and Bob Kakaha. Bradley Torreano of Allrovi disliked the album, criticizing it as "wildly uneven and at times hilariously bad," but also stating "Vanilla Ice is still better than a lot of the rap-metal bands that erupted in 2000/2001" and that the rap beats on Bomb Tha System "are surprisingly solid." In The New Rolling Stone Album Guide, Rob Kemp gave the album one out of five stars, calling the album "utterly listless". According to a Sony BMG executive, sales of Bi-Polar were "not bad...for Vanilla Ice. That's pretty respectable. Seriously."

=== Independent releases and television (2002–2009) ===
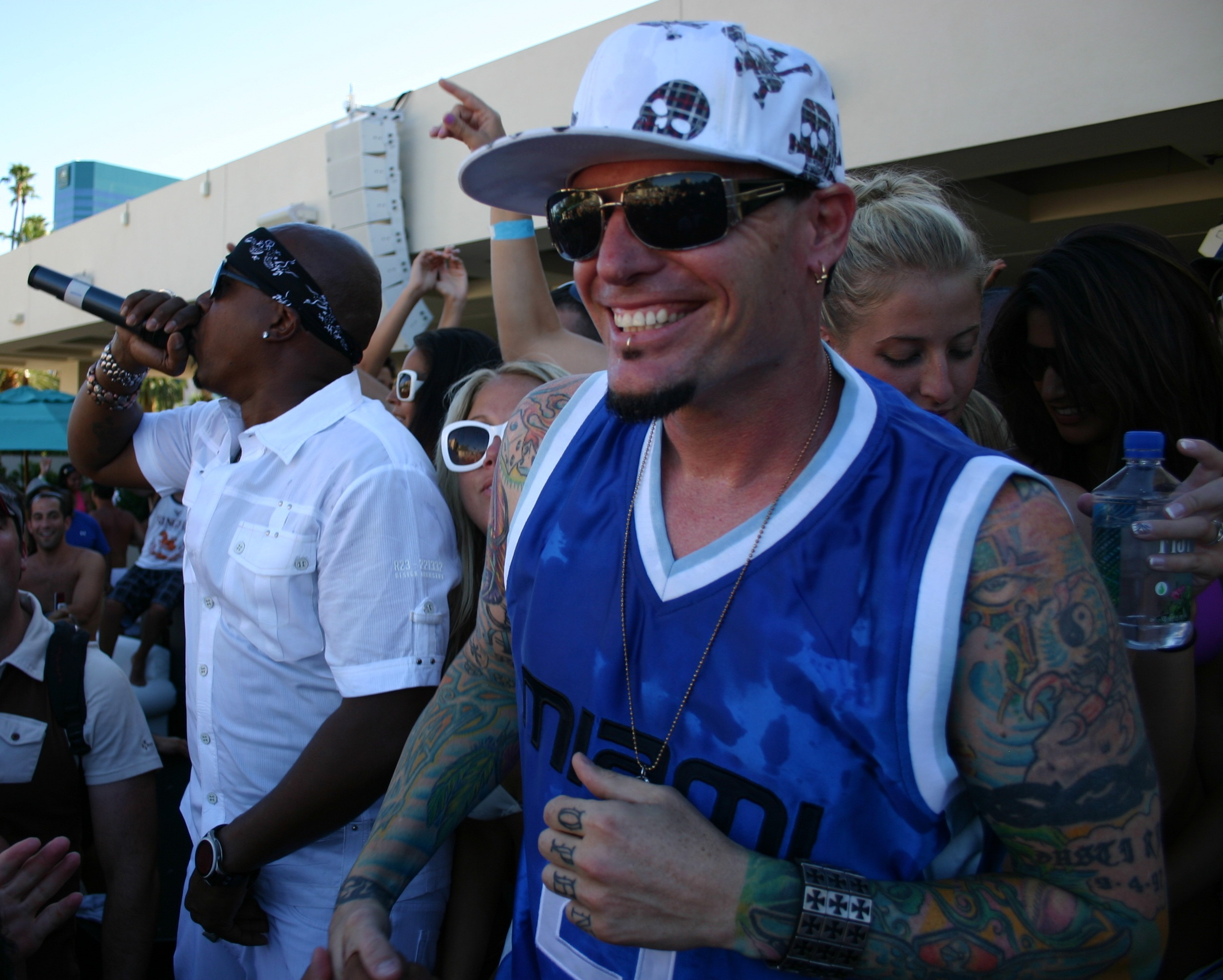
Vanilla Ice (foreground) and MC Hammer (left) performing in July 2009

With Quon back as manager, Ice was scheduled to appear in various reality TV programs. Ice, still an entertainer at heart, felt that the experience would be good for him. In 2002, he appeared on Celebrity Boxing, fighting Todd Bridges under the name 'Bi-Polar'. In 2003, he appeared in five episodes of Hollywood Squares, eight episodes of The Farm and three episodes of Celebrity Bull Riding Challenge, and made a cameo appearance in The New Guy in 2002. Around this time, Vanilla Ice also returned to the world of motocross. He auditioned for the 2002 X Games in the freestyle division and placed seventh at the 2003 Suzuki Crossover challenge, according to Sports Illustrated. He told the magazine that the track "is where I'm happiest."

In 2003, Ice contributed vocals to "Off the Chain" by 7x70, a side project of Iron Maiden drummer Nicko McBrain and Anthrax guitarist Dan Spitz. A demo of the song was leaked in June. In 2003, Ultrax reissued Bomb Tha System (the second part of "Bi-Polar") under the title Hot Sex, which was a single from the original album.

From January to February 2004, Ice appeared on the reality television series The Surreal Life. Although much of the series was staged, Ice found the experience to be therapeutic, stating that a comment made by Tammy Faye Messner during filming, "We are who we are because of who we were", helped him accept his past.

On August 2, 2005, Ice released his fifth studio album, Platinum Underground. He stated that the title of the album reflected the fact that he could maintain a fanbase without mainstream airplay. Allrovi reviewer Rob Theakston panned the album, writing that it "has more bad spots in it than most". Ice included a song titled Ninja Rap 2, which was set to be a hardcore remix. Aside from the name, the song has very little connection to Ice's original 1991 single, but rather talks about his appreciation of his fans, his love of performing at clubs and playing at the Gathering of the Juggalos with Insane Clown Posse. Ninja Rap 2 was the first song to be released from Platinum Underground and was available to download for free on Ice's official website.

In 2007, Ice returned to a spin-off of The Surreal Life titled The Surreal Life: Fame Games, where he again trashed the set after being voted off. In September 2008, Ice signed a contract with Cleopatra Records, recording the cover album Vanilla Ice Is Back! at the label's request. The album was released on November 4, 2008, and contained covers of songs by Public Enemy, House of Pain, Bob Marley, and Cypress Hill. IGN reviewer Spence D. called the album "an embarrassing endeavor that sounds like it should have stayed locked inside Ice's studio (or at the very least leaked on YouTube and passed off as a piss take)." On February 27, 2009, Ice performed as part of a joint performance with MC Hammer in Orem, Utah, called "Hammer Pants And Ice", which featured twenty four dancers and a full choir.

=== Since 2009 ===
In August 2009, Ice signed a contract with StandBy Records; however, Ice later left the label. Ice was a special musical guest at the 2010 National Television Awards in January, performing with Jedward for their remix and debut single "Under Pressure (Ice Ice Baby)". Ice also recorded his verse for their album Planet Jedward and appeared in the music video. He was a part of The Back2Kool concert tour with Turbo B and MC Hammer, playing worldwide in late 2010, and reunited with his former DJ, Floyd 'Earthquake' Brown, for the shows overseas. In early 2011, Vanilla Ice appeared on the sixth season of the UK show Dancing on Ice, as well as various ice skating tours surrounding the show.

In 2009, Ice started filming a reality television series called The Vanilla Ice Project, which premiered on DIY Network on October 14, 2010. The season was focused on renovating a house in Palm Beach, Florida, with each episode dedicated to a different room in the house. In 2011, Ice published a book on the subject, Vanilla Ice Project – Real Estate Guide, on how to succeed in real estate. The book was made available as a free digital download on his real estate website. The second season began airing in January 2012, the third season in January 2013.

In June 2011, Ice filmed a role in the movie That's My Boy, starring Adam Sandler and Andy Samberg, (released in 2012). In the film, Ice portrays an exaggerated version of himself called Uncle Vanny. While shooting, he collaborated with Samberg and Sandler musically. In August, Ice performed at the 2011 Gathering of the Juggalos; he signed with Psychopathic Records, but later departed from the label without releasing anything. His sixth studio album, WTF, was released on August 19 through Radium Records. While the record featured an array of different styles, like other recent Vanilla Ice albums, it also featured Ice's return to Electronica, with songs like "Turn It Up", "Rock Star Party", "Nightmare Disco" and "Cadillac Ninjas". Regarding the new record and its numerous musical genres, Ice said, "It's like techno hip-hop. European. I live a lot in Europe, and when I'm over there I get way into the techno stuff and I get into new music. So I thought I'd make a record of it. I did the thing and it was a lot of fun".

In December 2011, Ice played Captain Hook in the Chatham, Kent, Central Theatre pantomime production of Peter Pan, a role that previously belonged to Henry Winkler. He also turned on the Christmas lights for Rochester, Kent, in Rochester Castle, as part of the promotion for the panto. On May 12, 2012, Vanilla Ice helped in the launch of the Mr. Freeze Reverse Blast roller coaster at Six Flags over Texas in Arlington with a free concert for valid daily park ticket or 2012 Season Pass holders. In mid-2013, Vanilla Ice joined the New Kids on the Block tour alongside Boyz II Men.

On September 15, 2013, Vanilla Ice performed at the halftime show of a Houston Texans game. Houston went on to lose the remaining fourteen games of the season, leading some players to blame Vanilla Ice for the losing streak.

In the Western comedy film The Ridiculous Six, released in 2015, Ice portrayed Mark Twain. He also had a non-speaking cameo in another Netflix movie, Sandy Wexler.

In 2016, Vanilla Ice competed on season 23 of Dancing with the Stars. He was partnered with professional dancer Witney Carson. They were eliminated on October 4, 2016.

On September 16, 2017, Vanilla Ice joined Insane Clown Posse in a free concert, the Juggalo March On Washington. Between 2015 and 2016, Vanilla Ice was one of the main headliners for the worldwide 'I Love the 90s Tour'.

On January 4, 2019, Dave Franco was cast to star as Ice in a biopic chronicling the rapper's life.

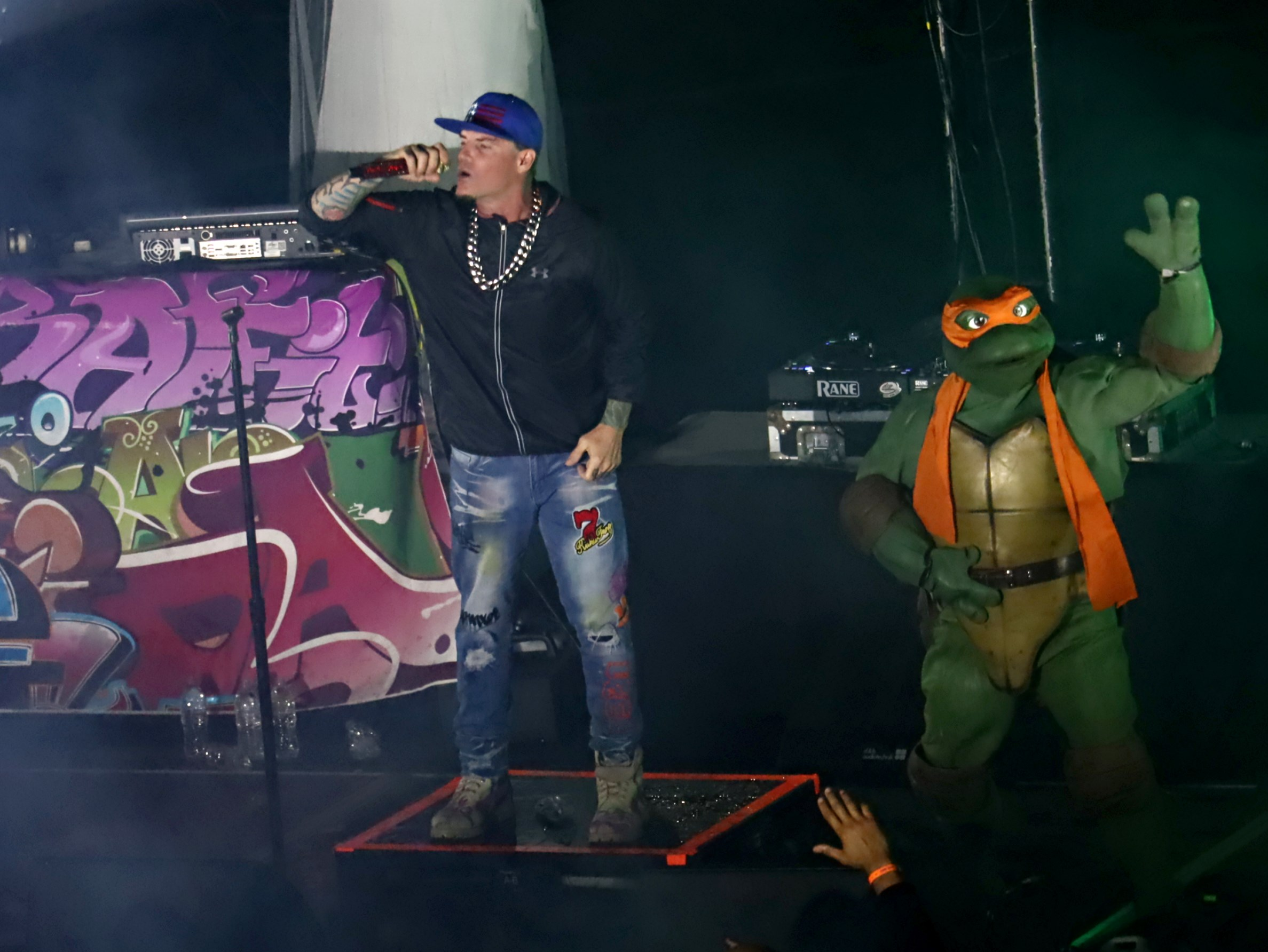
Vanilla Ice (left) performing alongside Michelangelo of the Teenage Mutant Ninja Turtles in 2023

On December 31, 2020, Ice was the star attraction at a New Year's Eve party at President Trump's mansion Mar-a-Lago. The President himself was unable to attend, but Donald Trump Jr. captured Ice's performance on his cellphone. New Year's Eve 2020 was also the younger Trump's 43rd birthday. Notable attendees included Don Jr.'s girlfriend Kimberly Guilfoyle, Rudy Giuliani, Sean Spicer and others.

In June 2021, Ice narrated a BBC Radio 5 Live documentary podcast about the theft of the racehorse Shergar.

== Personal life ==
Vanilla Ice dated Madonna for eight months in 1991–1992. Ice married Laura Giaritta in 1997. They filed for divorce in 2016; the divorce was finalized in 2019. They have two daughters, Dusti Rain (born 1997) and KeeLee Breeze (born 2000). Vanilla Ice has a third daughter, born in 2018.

Ice describes himself as a "Juggalo", a fan of Psychopathic Records hip-hop groups. By 2012, Ice was a vegetarian for six years.

In 2013, Ice stated that he has Choctaw heritage through his maternal grandmother. In 2015, after Ice repeated his claim of Choctaw identity in response to criticisms of Native American portrayals in The Ridiculous 6, Choctaw genealogists researched his family tree, finding his maternal genealogy to be mostly German, with no Choctaw ancestry possible. Ice responded via Twitter that "I'm not going to pretend I'm Indian, just because I have Indian blood. Sorry for any disrespect[;] to me Indians are American royalty." He stated that he is politically neutral: "I would never try and comment on how to run a country. I'm neutral. I don't do anything. I stay in my lane if that makes any sense".

=== Legal issues ===
In 1990, Ice was threatened with copyright infringement for use of samples from "Under Pressure" by Queen and David Bowie. The matter was settled out of court.

On June 3, 1991, Ice was arrested in Los Angeles on firearm charges after threatening a homeless man, James N. Gregory, with a pistol. Gregory had approached Ice's car outside of a supermarket and attempted to sell him a silver chain. Ice and his bodyguard were charged with three weapons offenses. Ice pled no contest.

In January 2001, Ice was arrested by police in Davie, Florida, for assaulting his wife, Laura. According to the criminal complaint, Ice and his wife argued as they drove on Interstate 595. Ice admitted to pulling hair from her head to prevent her from jumping out of the truck's window. He pled guilty to charges of disorderly conduct four months later and was sentenced to probation and ordered to attend family therapy sessions.

Ice's pet wallaroo, Bucky, and pet goat, Pancho, escaped from his wife's grandmother's home in Port St. Lucie, Florida, in November 2004. After wandering around local streets for over a week, the animals were caught and returned to Ice. He paid a $220 fine for expired pet tags and an undisclosed fine for the escape of the animals.

On April 10, 2008, Ice was arrested in Palm Beach County on a battery charge for allegedly kicking and hitting his wife. He was released the following day, after she declared that her husband had only pushed her. In court, the couple's neighbor, Frank Morales, stated that it was merely a verbal argument. Ice was ordered by a Florida court to stay away from his wife following his arrest, and to communicate with his children only if Morales accompanied him. The judge told Ice that he could only contact his wife through telephone. On April 29, 2008, Ice's lawyers, Bradford Cohen and Joseph LoRusso, were able to get the charges dropped after providing the state attorney with evidence that conflicted with what was originally reported.

In February 2015, Ice was arrested and charged with residential burglary and grand theft after he allegedly stole furniture, a pool heater, bicycles and other items from a Florida home that he believed to be vacant. He later accepted a plea deal which would result in the charges being dropped following his completion of 100 hours of community service and payment of restitution to the estate of the homeowner.

== Style and influences ==
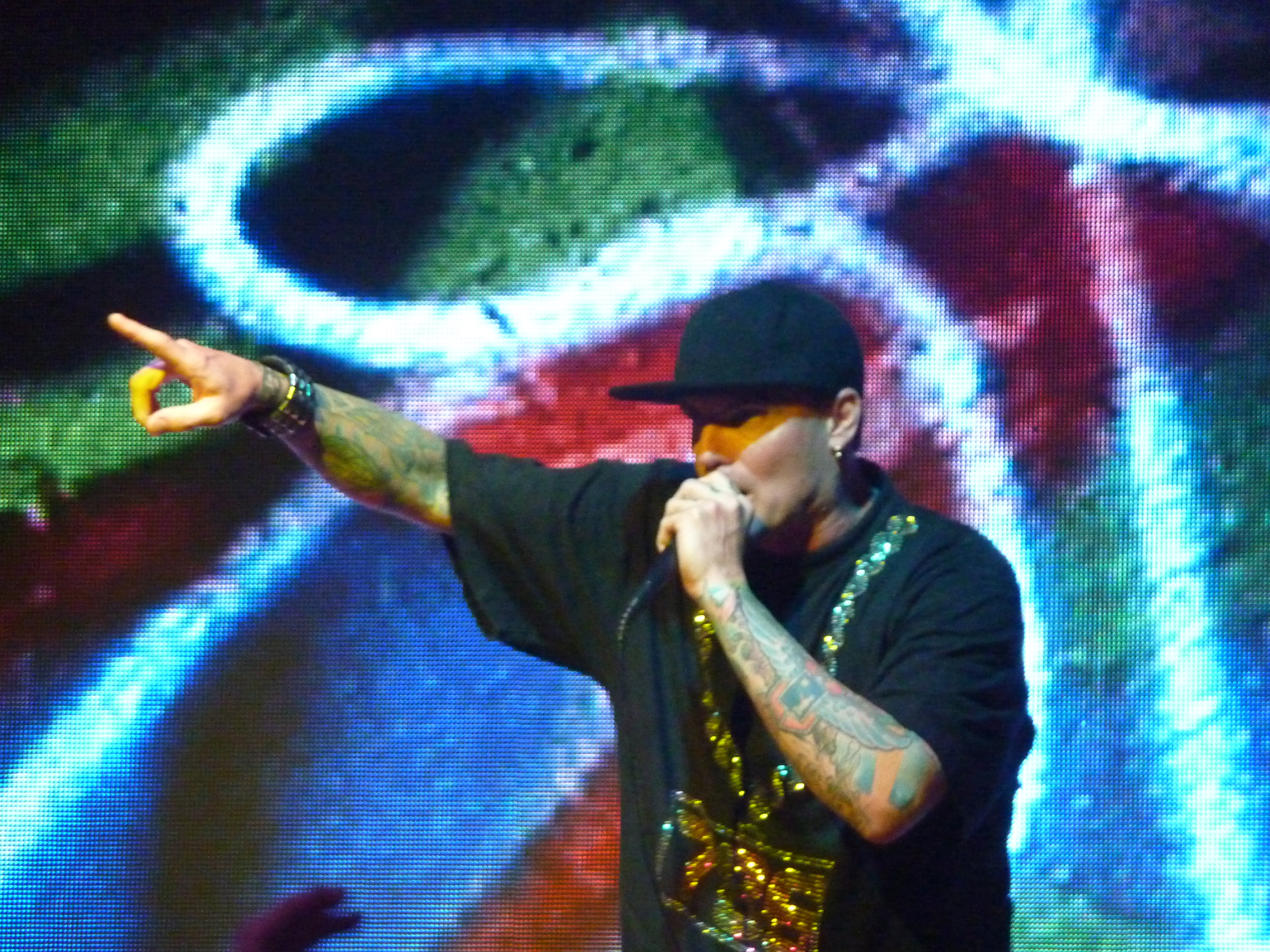
Vanilla Ice in 2010

As of the late 2000s, Ice's live performances feature a mix of newer, rock and techno-influenced material and old-school hip-hop. Ice performs with a live drummer and DJ, and sometimes sprays his audience with bottled water. Ice's performances often feature an inflatable grim reaper balloon, a dancer in a clown mask, and confetti thrown into the audience. Describing his performances, Ice stated "It's high energy, stage diving, pyrotechnics, girls showing their breasts. It's crazy party atmosphere."

Ice stated that his musical style was influenced by underground music, rather than mainstream music, and that his influences included hip-hop and funk artists such as Funkadelic, Rick James, Roger Troutman, Egyptian Lover and Parliament. Ice is a big fan of 50's and 60's reggae and Bob Marley's work and has also stated that he enjoys Rage Against the Machine, Slipknot, and System of a Down.

Ice sometimes plays bass, drums and keyboards on studio recordings. Vanilla Ice referred to his mainstream music as "above-ground" rather than underground, as he tried to make danceable beats and removed expletives so that the songs could reach a wider audience. A lot of his early hits had Ice boasting of sexual conquests. In 1991, Ice was quoted as saying "I rap about what I know. Girls and stuff. That's what is going through my head."

When asked about his darker sound in 2002, Ice replied; "Music is about reflection and I'm just reflecting my life and everything it's been [...] there's no way I'm going to be able to stress what I want and mean over a break beat [...] it's too emotional and it's too intense [...] [I] have to have the intensity of the band; it's like a symphony [...] [I] have to build on the intense parts [...] it just wasn't going to happen — to come [across as] extreme over some hip hop record — so to exorcise my demons I had to have the band."

== Legacy and reception ==
Along with Beastie Boys, 3rd Bass, and House of Pain, Ice was one of the earliest white rappers to attain major success. Chuck D has credited Ice as a regional breakthrough, stating "He broke through in the mid-South, in a Southern area in Texas, in something that was kind of indigenous to that hip-hop culture down there. He just doesn't get credit for it." The other half of Public Enemy, Flavor Flav, has commented "Vanilla Ice, that's my man".

After signing with Psychopathic Records, Violent J mentioned that Insane Clown Posse were longtime fans of Ice's work; "We were bumping him way before "Ice Ice Baby" blew up. We were bumping him when he had his first record out on Ichiban. Shaggy had the vinyl and we used to bump that shit up in his room. It felt like two summers before that shit blew up." "Thanda Thanda Pani" (Cold Cold Water) by Baba Sehgal was inspired heavily by Vanilla Ice's music and style. Rapper Riff Raff has mentioned in interviews that Vanilla Ice was one of his biggest influences.

The late rapper Ol' Dirty Bastard appeared on stage with Vanilla Ice during the 2004 Gathering of the Juggalos and expressed interest in working on a song together after stating that he was Ice's "greatest fan". Rapper G-Child, best known for her appearance on ego trip's The (White) Rapper Show, has credited Ice as being a major influence on her work. After meeting Ice in 2000, G-Child performed freestyle raps at six of Ice's performances, and opened for him four times.

=== Introspective view ===
In 1998, Vanilla Ice expressed regret over the record deal that led to the success of his debut album. He confessed in the interview that he "[...] sold out and was forced to play this puppet role with this image laid out. It made me very wealthy but it also turned me into a novelty act. I jumped out of my skin and became a target."

=== Feuds ===
In 1991, 3rd Bass released a single called "Pop Goes the Weasel", and in the lyrics compares Ice unfavorably to Elvis Presley. The song's music video featured Henry Rollins as Ice, who is depicted as being assaulted by 3rd Bass. Ice responded to "Pop Goes the Weasel" with his 1992 song "The Wrath". Del tha Funkee Homosapien referred to Ice in the lyrics of "Pissin' on Your Steps", which appeared on his 1991 debut album I Wish My Brother George Was Here. Similar to "Pop Goes the Weasel", the song negatively makes a connection between Ice and Elvis, while saying Ice alongside MC Hammer are mocking hip-hop by being commercial. Vanilla Ice answered back to most of his critics in the song "Hit 'em Hard".

Eminem has often name-dropped Vanilla Ice in his songs, as early as taped freestyles he did with rapper Proof in 1992 where they performed against each other portraying Ice and MC Hammer, respectively. In his first single "Just Don't Give a Fuck", Eminem mentions Ice alongside Everlast, boasting in a playful manner that he is a better rapper. In "Role Model", Eminem says he ripped out Vanilla Ice's dreadlocks. Ice responded in a magazine interview with Vibe saying that Eminem "raps like a girl". While neither Vanilla Ice nor Eminem look at their responses as an actual beef, Eminem replied to Vanilla Ice's quote in his song "Marshall Mathers", which also featured a verbal attack on the Insane Clown Posse. Eminem mentioned Ice again in the song "Purple Pills" in 2001, which caused Vanilla Ice's only response in song. On his album Bi-Polar, Ice mentions Eminem in a positive light ("Hip Hop Rules") and in a negative light ("Exhale"); however, Ice stated that he has no bad feelings towards Eminem. In a 2002 interview, Vanilla Ice stated that he thought Eminem's references were flattering, going on to say "I give him credit, I think he's talented, I think he's a killer rapper, you know I don't compare myself to him because he's another white rapper, I don't compare myself to any other rapper period, I don't colorize hip hop, it's stupid, but for people who are doing that are just looking through the eyes of a racial standpoint, and it really shouldn't be looked at that way, you're looking at two musicians that are in a broad brand of hip hop, so you don't need to compare us two. Following me, any white rapper is going to have to hear 'oh, you think you're Vanilla Ice?', so I am sure he's heard that." In April 2009, Ice appeared in the music video for Eminem's song "We Made You". In November 2023, Ice told VladTV that Eminem would be "stupid" to not acknowledge his influence on him.

=== Other appearances ===
Vanilla Ice appears as a video game character in Championship Motocross released in 2001 on PlayStation 2. Former Ultimate Fighting Championship light heavyweight champion Chuck 'The Iceman' Lidell used Ice's song Too Cold for his entrance to the ring. In 2007, Nike released Vanilla Ice shoes for their Fallen Heroes pack. In March 2009, Ice participated in a Virgin Mobile advertising campaign titled "Right Music Wrongs", apologizing for his 1990s image. As part of the campaign, Ice was placed on "trial", and was voted innocent by users of the campaign website. He also appeared in a commercial for the South African light beer Castle Lite.

In 2010, Vanilla Ice was featured on the debut single of the Irish duo Jedward, a mashup of "Under Pressure" and "Ice Ice Baby". "Under Pressure (Ice Ice Baby)" was released in the United Kingdom on January 31, 2010, via download and as a physical single on February 15, 2010. In 2010, Serbian musicians Slađa Delibašić and Shwarz released the single and music video Dizel Power. The music video and song feature various references to Vanilla Ice, including the performers dancing next to a graffiti mural of Ice. The video has reached two million views on YouTube.

In 2021, Vanilla Ice was part of a Samsung eco advertising campaign featuring a remixed version of "Ice Ice Baby".

He makes an appearance in the 2023 video game Crime Boss: Rockay City as both an antagonist and playable character as an unlockable skin.

== Band members ==
Current

- DJ Dirty Chopstix – turntables
- Kool Keith – drums
- Trent Laugerman – drums
- Krazy Klown – dancer and background vocals
- Maniac – dancer

Former

- Earthquake (1987–2014) – turntables and background vocals
- DJ Don't Play (1985–2009) – turntables and background vocals
- Zero (1985–2014) – turntables and background vocals
- D-Shay (1985–1991) – turntables and drums
- Clint Barlow – drums (2004–2011)
- Tha Hit Man (1997–2005) – drums
- Boom (1990–1995) – drums
- Bobzilla (2000–2004) – bass
- Doug Ardito (1998–2001) – bass
- Scott G. Shriner (1997–1999) – bass
- 2Hype / Rod-J (1991–2004) – Hype Man and background vocals
- Chill (1992–1994) – Hype Man and background vocals
- Hi-Tec (1985–1995) – dancer and background vocals
- Koko (1985–2010) – dancer and background vocals
- Squirrel (1985–1995) – dancer and background vocals
- Twist (1987–1993) – dancer and background vocals
- E-Rock (1987–1991) – dancer and background vocals
- Juice (1989–1991) – dancer and background vocals
- Ste~bo (1990–1992) – dancer and background vocals

== Discography ==
Studio albums

- To the Extreme (1990)
- Mind Blowin' (1994)
- Hard to Swallow (1998)
- Bi-Polar (2001)
- Platinum Underground (2005)
- W.T.F. (Wisdom, Tenacity and Focus) (2011)

== Filmography ==
=== Film ===
Year	Title	Role	Notes
1991	Teenage Mutant Ninja Turtles II: The Secret of the Ooze	Himself	
1991	Cool as Ice	John 'Johnny' Van Owen	
2000	Da Hip Hop Witch	Himself	
2002	The New Guy	Music Store Employee	
2005	The Helix...Loaded	Theo	
2007	The Bros.	Himself	
2010	Big Money Rustlas	Heckler #3	
2012	That's My Boy	Himself	
2015	The Ridiculous 6	Mark Twain	
2017	Sandy Wexler	Himself	
2020	The Wrong Missy	Himself	
2023	Seaper Powers: Mystery of the Blue Pearls	Steve the Starfish (voice)	
TBD	Zombie Plane	Himself	

=== Television ===
Year	Title	Role	Notes
2010–19	The Vanilla Ice Project	Himself/Host	Main Host
2013–15	Vanilla Ice Goes Amish	Himself/Host	Main Host
2016	Brother Vs. Brother	Himself	Celebrity judge during Season 4
2016	Dancing with the Stars	Himself	Contestant on season 23

== Awards and nominations ==
American Music Awards

Year	Nominated work	Award	Result
1991	Vanilla Ice	Favorite Pop/Rock New Artist	Won
1991	Vanilla Ice	Favorite Rap/Hip-Hop Artist	Nominated
1991	To the Extreme	Favorite Rap/Hip-Hop Album	Nominated
1991	Vanilla Ice	Favorite Rap/Hip-Hop New Artist	Won

Grammy Awards

Year	Nominated work	Award	Result
1991	"Ice Ice Baby"	Best Rap Solo Performance	Nominated

People's Choice Awards

Year	Nominated work	Award	Result
1991	"Ice Ice Baby"	Best New Song	Won

Kids' Choice Awards

Year	Nominated work	Award	Result
1991	Vanilla Ice	Favorite Male Singer/Group	Won
1991	"Ice Ice Baby"	Favorite Song	Won

Soul Train Music Awards

Year	Nominated work	Award	Result
1991	Vanilla Ice	Best R&B/Urban Contemporary New Artist	Nominated

The Factual Entertainment Awards

Year	Nominated work	Award	Result
2011	"The Vanilla Ice Project"	Best Home Show	Won

Golden Raspberry Awards

Year	Nominated work	Award	Result
1992	Vanilla Ice	Worst New Star	Won
1992	Vanilla Ice	Worst Actor	Nominated
1992	"Cool as Ice (Everybody Get Loose)"	Worst Original Song	Nominated
2013	Vanilla Ice	Worst Supporting Actor	Nominated
