= Ice Ice Baby =

1990 single by Vanilla Ice

Single by Vanilla Ice

from the album To the Extreme
- A-side: "Play That Funky Music" (US)
- B-side: "It's a Party" (UK)
- Released: August 22, 1990
- Genre: Hip-hop; pop rap
- Length: 3:46 (radio edit); 4:31 (album version)
- Label: SBK
- Songwriters: Robert Van Winkle; Mario Johnson; Brian May; David Bowie; Freddie Mercury; John Deacon; Roger Taylor
- Producer: Vanilla Ice

Vanilla Ice singles chronology
"Ice Ice Baby" (1990)	"Play That Funky Music" (1990)

Music video
- "Ice Ice Baby" on YouTube

"Ice Ice Baby" is the debut single by American rapper Vanilla Ice. Released by SBK Records, on his debut album, To the Extreme (1990), it is his best-known song and has appeared in remixed form on Platinum Underground and Vanilla Ice Is Back! A live version appears on the album Extremely Live, while a nu metal version appears on the album Hard to Swallow, under the title "Too Cold". "Ice Ice Baby" samples the bassline of the song "Under Pressure" by British rock band Queen and British singer David Bowie, who did not receive songwriting credit or royalties until after it had become a hit.

"Ice Ice Baby" was first released as the B-side to Vanilla Ice's cover of "Play That Funky Music", but the single was not initially successful. When disc jockey David Morales played "Ice Ice Baby" instead, it began to gain success. "Ice Ice Baby" was the first hip-hop single to top the US Billboard Hot 100. The song topped the charts in Australia, Belgium, the Netherlands, New Zealand, the Republic of Ireland, the UK and Germany.

== Lyrics and music ==
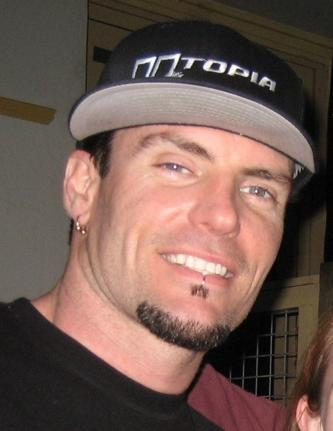
Vanilla Ice based the song's lyrics upon the South Florida area in which he lived.

Robert Van Winkle, better known by his stage name Vanilla Ice, wrote "Ice Ice Baby" in 1983 at the age of 16, basing its lyrics upon his experiences in South Florida. The lyrics describe a shooting and Van Winkle's rhyming skills. The chorus of "Ice Ice Baby" originates from the signature chant of the national African American fraternity Alpha Phi Alpha. Of the song's lyrics, Van Winkle stated in a 2001 interview that "If you released 'Ice Ice Baby' today, it would fit in today's lyrical respect among peers, you know what I'm sayin'? [...] My lyrics aren't, 'Pump it up, go! Go!' At least I'm sayin' somethin'."

The song's hook samples the bassline of the 1981 song "Under Pressure" by Queen and David Bowie, who did not initially receive credit or royalties for the sample. In a 1990 interview, Van Winkle claimed the two melodies were slightly different because he had added an additional note on the "and" of the fourth beat. In later interviews, Van Winkle readily admitted he sampled the song and claimed his 1990 statement was a joke; others, however, suggested he had been serious. After representatives for Queen and Bowie threatened a copyright infringement suit against him, the matter was settled out of court, with Van Winkle being required to pay financial recompense to the original artists. Bowie and all members of Queen were also given songwriting credit for the sample. "Ice Ice Baby" is written in the key of D minor.

In December 1990, Van Winkle told British youth music magazine Smash Hits where he came up with the idea of sampling "Under Pressure":

The way I do stuff is to go through old records that my brother has. He used to listen to rock 'n' roll and stuff like that. I listened to funk and hip hop because rock wasn't really my era. But having a brother like that, well, I just mixed the two, and he had a copy of 'Under Pressure'. And putting those sounds to hip hop was great.

— Robert Van Winkle, Smash Hits

"Ice Ice Baby" is an early example of pop rap, with Van Winkle describing himself as the first rapper to cross into the pop market. He said that although his pioneer status forced him to "take the heat for a lot of people" for his music's use of samples, the criticism he received over sample use allowed sampling to become acceptable in mainstream hip-hop.

== Release ==
"Ice Ice Baby" was initially released by Ichiban Records as the B-side to Van Winkle's cover of "Play That Funky Music". The 12-inch single featured the radio, instrumental and a cappella versions of "Play That Funky Music" and the radio version and "Miami Drop" remix of "Ice Ice Baby". When a disc jockey named David Morales played "Ice Ice Baby" instead of the single's A-side, the song gained more success than "Play That Funky Music". A music video for "Ice Ice Baby" was produced for $5000. The video was financed by Van Winkle's manager, Tommy Quon, and shot on the roof of a warehouse in Dallas, Texas.

In the video, Van Winkle is shown rapping the lyrics while he and others dance to the song. Heavy airplay of the video by The Box while Van Winkle was still unknown increased public interest in the song. "Ice Ice Baby" was given its own single, released in 1990 by SBK Records in the United States, and EMI Records in the United Kingdom. The SBK single contained the "Miami Drop", instrumental and radio mixes of "Ice Ice Baby" and the album version of "It's a Party". The EMI single contained the club and radio mixes of the song, and the shortened radio edit. The single was quickly pulled from the American market soon after the song reached number one, in a successful attempt to drive consumers to buy the album instead.

== Reception ==
"Ice Ice Baby" garnered critical acclaim, was the first hip hop single to top the Billboard charts, and has been credited for helping diversify hip hop by introducing it to a mainstream audience.

Larry Flick from Billboard magazine commented, "Photogenic white rapper rocks impressively over a sparse beat-bed that borrows heavily from Queen's 'Under Pressure'. Could pack a powerful multiformat punch." The Daily Vault's Christopher Thelen said it "did more for overexposure than New Coke did for soft drinks". Entertainment Weekly reviewer Mim Udovitch wrote that "[Vanilla Ice] probably would have scored with his hit rap single 'Ice Ice Baby' even if he hadn't been white. There's just something about the way its hook – a sample from Queen and David Bowie's 'Under Pressure' — grabs you and flings you out onto the dance floor." Selina Webb from Music Week said, "Equally lacking in originality yet holding the same commercial appeal". She added, "The catchy part is borrowed from Queen's 'Under Pressure', the vocal is a cool white rap. Slightly more street cred than the New Kids, yet falling squarely into the same huge market." A reviewer from The Network Forty said that "like Mellow Man Ace, the rap melts slowly and is as much a mood piece as it is a cruising tune. A motocross champion from Dallas via Miami, the 22-year-old Ice says it's time to chill out." Stephen Dalton from NME complimented it as a "catchy pop thumper".

Following the song's success, California rapper Mario "Chocolate" Johnson, an associate of record producer Suge Knight, claimed that he had helped in writing the song, and had not received credit or royalties. Knight and two bodyguards arrived at The Palm in West Hollywood, where Van Winkle was eating. After shoving Van Winkle's bodyguards aside, Knight and his own bodyguards sat down opposite Van Winkle, staring at him before finally asking "How you doin'?" Similar incidents were repeated several times before Knight showed up at Van Winkle's suite on the fifteenth floor of the Bel Age Hotel, accompanied by Johnson and a member of the Los Angeles Raiders. According to Van Winkle, Knight took him out on the balcony by himself, and implied that he would throw Van Winkle off unless he signed the rights to the song over to Knight.

== Legacy ==
Detroit-based rapper Eminem stated that when he first heard "Ice Ice Baby", he saw Van Winkle as a "fake", saying, "I felt like I didn't want to rap anymore. I was so mad, because he was making it real hard for me."

After audiences began to view Van Winkle as a novelty act and a pop star rather than a legitimate rapper, his popularity began to decline. Van Winkle lost some credibility among hip hop fans, but later began to regain some success, attracting a new audience outside of the mainstream audience that had formerly accepted him and then rejected him. "Ice Ice Baby" continues to be the signature song that Van Winkle is best known for internationally, although Van Winkle states that his American fans like his newer music better.

According to Rolling Stone, the "Ice Ice Baby"–"Under Pressure" controversy is a landmark music copyright case, since it "sparked discussion about the punitive actions taken in plagiarism cases". The magazine's Jordan Runtagh added: "Though [Vanilla Ice] paid the price, some argue that isn't enough to make up for the potential credibility lost by Queen and David Bowie, who are now linked to him through a collaboration they had no choice in joining."

A live version of the song appeared on the album Extremely Live. "Ice Ice Baby" was rerecorded in a nu metal version titled "Too Cold". Originally intended to be released as a hidden track or B-side, "Too Cold" was featured on Van Winkle's 1998 album Hard to Swallow, and received radio play in some markets. In 2000, a remix titled "Ice Ice Baby 2001" was released in Europe as a single, with a newly produced music video. The remix generated new international interest in Van Winkle's music.

"Ice Ice Baby" was awarded one of BMI's Pop Awards in 1992, honoring the songwriters, composers and music publishers of the song. In November 2011, MTV Dance ranked the song No. 71 in their list of "The 100 Biggest 90's Dance Anthems of All Time". In 2019, Billboard magazine listed it at No. 108 in their ranking of "Billboard's Top Songs of the '90s". VH1 and Blender ranked "Ice Ice Baby" fifth on its list of the "50 Most Awesomely Bad Songs Ever". It was also given the distinction by the Houston Press as being the worst song ever to emanate from Texas. In 1999, the song's music video was "retired" on the MTV special 25 Lame, in which Van Winkle himself appeared to destroy the video's master tape. Given a baseball bat, Van Winkle ended up destroying the show's set. However, in December 2007, VH1 ranked the song in 29th place of their 100 Greatest Songs of the 90's.

In 1991, Alvin and the Chipmunks released a cover version entitled "Ice Ice Alvin" for their album The Chipmunks Rock the House. "Weird Al" Yankovic included the chorus as the final song in "Polka Your Eyes Out", the polka medley from his 1992 album Off the Deep End. In 2004, the song was featured in the film 13 Going on 30. In 2010, the song was featured in the Glee episode "Bad Reputation" as performed by Will Schuester (Matthew Morrison). In 2012, several references to the song were made in the film That's My Boy, where Van Winkle appeared as himself – protagonist Donny Berger (Adam Sandler), an old friend of Van Winkle, asks him for money, claiming he should be "loaded" with the royalties he receives from the song; however, Van Winkle tells him that "Queen took 50 percent, Suge took the other 60 percent, I fucking owe money when that shit gets played, man!" Later on, Donny and Van Winkle drive in Van Winkle's Ford Mustang 5.0, a reference to the car he drove in the music video (but not the same car), then listen to the song on Van Winkle's Walkman as they run.

In February 2026, the song experienced a resurgence in popularity, in large part because of the United States Immigration and Customs Enforcement (ICE), with both advocates and opponents of ICE using the song in social media videos.

== Charts ==
=== Weekly charts ===
Weekly chart performance for "Ice Ice Baby"
Chart (1990–1991)	Peak position
Australia (ARIA)	1
Austria (Ö3 Austria Top 40)	3
Belgium (Ultratop 50 Flanders)	1
Canada Top Singles (RPM)	11
Denmark (IFPI)	9
Europe (Eurochart Hot 100)	1
Finland (Suomen virallinen lista)	2
France (SNEP)	10
Germany (GfK)	2
Greece (IFPI)	2
Ireland (IRMA)	1
Israel (Israeli Singles Chart)	12
Italy (Musica e dischi)	15
Luxembourg (Radio Luxembourg)	1
Netherlands (Dutch Top 40)	1
Netherlands (Single Top 100)	1
New Zealand (Recorded Music NZ)	1
Norway (VG-lista)	2
Spain (AFE)	3
Sweden (Sverigetopplistan)	4
Switzerland (Schweizer Hitparade)	2
UK Singles (Official Charts)	1
US Billboard Hot 100	1
US Dance Club Songs (Billboard)	28
US Dance Singles Sales (Billboard)	6
US Hot R&B/Hip-Hop Songs (Billboard)	6
US Cash Box Top 100	1
Zimbabwe (ZIMA)	1

Chart (2004–2005)	Peak position
US Billboard Hot Ringtones	11

Chart (2006)	Peak position
France (SNEP)	65

Chart (2008)	Peak position
US Billboard Hot Ringtones	32

Chart (2014)	Peak position
New Zealand (Recorded Music NZ)	5

=== Year-end charts ===
Annual chart rankings for "Ice Ice Baby"
Chart (1990)	Position
Australia (ARIA)	34
Canada Top Singles (RPM)	98
Netherlands (Single Top 100)	66
New Zealand (Recorded Music NZ)	29
UK Singles (OCC)	4
US Billboard Hot 100	45
US Hot R&B/Hip-Hop Songs (Billboard)	98
US Cash Box Top 100	21

Chart (1991)	Position
Australia (ARIA)	22
Austria (Ö3 Austria Top 40)	22
Belgium (Ultratop Flanders)	16
Europe (European Hot 100 Singles)	7
Europe (European Hit Radio)	60
Germany (Official German Charts)	7
Italy (Musica e dischi)	75
Netherlands (Dutch Top 40)	31
Netherlands (Single Top 100)	22
Switzerland (Schweizer Hitparade)	9

=== Decade-end charts ===
Chart (1990–1999)	Rank
Belgium (Ultratop 50 Flanders)	48

== Certifications ==
Region	Certification	Certified units/sales
Australia (ARIA)	Platinum	70,000^{^}
Austria (IFPI Austria)	Gold	25,000^{*}
Canada (Music Canada)	Gold	50,000^{^}
Germany (BVMI)	Gold	250,000^{^}
Netherlands (NVPI)	Platinum	100,000^{^}
New Zealand (RMNZ)	Platinum	15,000^{*}
Sweden (GLF)	Gold	25,000^{^}
United Kingdom (BPI)	Platinum	600,000^{^}
United States (RIAA)	Platinum	1,000,000^{^}
United States (RIAA) Digital sales	Gold	500,000^{*}
^{*} Sales figures based on certification alone.^{^} Shipments figures based on certification alone.

== See also ==
- U Can't Touch This, 1990 sample of 1981 Super Freak
- Under Pressure (Ice Ice Baby)
