= To the Extreme =

Studio album by Vanilla Ice
- Released: September 10, 1990
- Recorded: 1989–1990
- Studios: Luminous Sound, Dallas, Texas
- Genres: Hip hop; pop rap
- Length: 57:18
- Labels: SBK; EMI
- Producers: Vanilla Ice; David DeBerry; Kim Sharp; Khayree; Darryl Williams; Mario "Choc" Johnson; Earthquake

Vanilla Ice chronology
To the Extreme (1990)	Extremely Live (1991)

Singles from To the Extreme
- 1. "Ice Ice Baby" Released: August 22, 1990; 2. "Play That Funky Music" Released: November 19, 1990; 3. "I Love You" Released: February 14, 1991

To the Extreme is the major-label debut studio album by American rapper Vanilla Ice, released on September 10, 1990, by SBK Records and EMI Records. Recorded between 1989–90, it contains Vanilla Ice's most successful single, "Ice Ice Baby". It primarily contains hip hop and pop rap tracks produced by Earthquake, Kim Sharp, Khayree, and Darryl Williams.

Following the release of an early version of the album titled Hooked by Ichiban Records in 1989, Ice was signed by SBK for $325,000 and the mixtape was partially re-recorded and repackaged under the To the Extreme name. It was supported by the release of three official singles: "Ice Ice Baby", "Play That Funky Music" and "I Love You".

The album was met with lukewarm reviews, with some critics praising Ice's abilities and showmanship, and others the simplistic lyrics and comparisons with fellow rapper MC Hammer. The album sparked controversy due to the unlicensed samples included on the album, including "Under Pressure" by David Bowie and Queen that was later settled out of court. Despite the controversies, To the Extreme appeared at the top of the US Billboard 200 albums chart for sixteen consecutive weeks and was certified seven times platinum by RIAA. The lead single "Ice Ice Baby" was the first rap single to top the Billboard Hot 100. The album was certified platinum in Canada, Australia and United Kingdom selling over 15 million copies in total. Ice was selected as the opening act of MC Hammer's 1990 tour, and later embarked on his To the Extreme World Tour, performing in North America, Europe, Malaysia, Singapore, Australia and Japan in 1991, and in Latin America in 1992.

== History ==
Album cover of Hooked, released by Ichiban Records

In early 1990, Vanilla Ice released an early version of To the Extreme under the title Hooked on the independent label Ichiban Records. "Play That Funky Music" was released as the album's first single, with "Ice Ice Baby" appearing as the B-side. The 12-inch single featured the radio, instrumental and a cappella versions of "Play That Funky Music" and the radio version and "Miami Drop" remix of "Ice Ice Baby". When a disc jockey played "Ice Ice Baby" instead of the single's A-side, the song gained more success than "Play That Funky Music". A music video for "Ice Ice Baby" was produced for $8,000. The video was financed by Vanilla Ice's manager, Tommy Quon, and shot on the roof of a warehouse in Dallas, Texas.

In 1990, Vanilla Ice signed to SBK Records, who reissued Hooked under the title To the Extreme. The reissue contained new artwork and music. "Ice Ice Baby" was released in August 1990 as a single in its own right, by SBK in the United States, and EMI Records in the United Kingdom. The SBK single contained the "Miami Drop", instrumental and radio mixes of "Ice Ice Baby" and the album version of "It's A Party". The EMI single contained the club and radio mixes of the song, and the shortened radio edit.

== Music ==
Vanilla Ice wrote "Ice Ice Baby" at the age of 16, basing its lyrics upon the South Florida area in which he was raised. The lyrics describe a drive-by shooting and Vanilla Ice's rhyming skills. The chorus of "Ice Ice Baby" originates from the signature chant of the national African American fraternity Alpha Phi Alpha. The song's hook samples the bassline of the 1981 song "Under Pressure" by Queen and David Bowie. Freddie Mercury and David Bowie did not receive credit or royalties for the sample. In a 1990 interview, Vanilla Ice joked the two melodies were slightly different because he had added an additional note. Vanilla Ice later paid Mercury and Bowie, who have since been given songwriting credit for the sample. However, he ended up purchasing the rights to the song, because it was cheaper than licensing the sample.

The stylistic origins of "Rosta Man" are based upon reggae toasting.

== Critical reception ==
Professional ratings
Review scores
Source	Rating
AllMusic	3/5 stars
Robert Christgau	C−
Entertainment Weekly	B
NME	7/10
The Rolling Stone Album Guide	3/5 stars
Select	(2/5)
Smash Hits	(8/10)

Entertainment Weekly reviewer Dom Lombardo gave the album a B, calling the album "so consistent in its borrowings that it could be a parody, if it weren't for its total absence of wit", but concluding that "if there's about a two-to-one ratio of winners [...] to clunkers, that's not the worst track record for a debut album." Udovitch cited "Ice Ice Baby", "Play That Funky Music", "Dancin'" and "It's a Party" as the album's highlights. Robert Christgau gave the album a C− rating, writing that Vanilla Ice's "suave sexism, fashionably male supremacist rather than dangerously obscene, is no worse than his suave beats". Stephen Dalton from NME wrote, "To the Extreme is the highly competent debut from a major pop talent. Listen without prejudice." Select stated that the album "packs in just about every musical and lyrical code of rap, yet still says nothing" and that "Kids and neophytes have a right to love it, but grown-ups will find Vanilla Ice spectacularly hollow."

AllMusic reviewer Steve Huey wrote that:

Ice's mic technique is actually stronger and more nimble than MC Hammer's, and he really tries earnestly to show off the skills he does have. Unfortunately, even if he can keep a mid-tempo pace, his flow is rhythmically stiff, and his voice has an odd timbre; plus, he never seems sure of the proper accent to adopt. He's able to overcome those flaws somewhat in isolated moments, but they become all too apparent over the course of an entire album.

After audiences began to view Vanilla Ice as a novelty act, his popularity began to decline. He would later regain some success, attracting a new audience outside of the mainstream audience that had formerly accepted him, and then rejected him.

== Commercial performance ==
To the Extreme was released in the US on September 10, 1990. On the issue of October 31, 1990 the album jumped from 23 to 7 on the US Billboard 200 selling over two million copies in its first five weeks of being released. The album reached the number one spot on the week of November 10, 1990 ending a 23-week run by M.C. Hammer's Please Hammer Don't Hurt 'Em and it stayed at the top for sixteen consecutive weeks. At the time, To the Extreme was named the fastest debut album of all time selling over 6 million on 14 weeks. In the same month, was certified gold, platinum, double-platinum, triple-platinum and quadruple-platinum in the next day, becoming one of the fastest-certified albums in history.

By January 1991, it was the fastest selling album since Purple Rain (1984) reaching six million copies sold in just three months and four days. Eventually, seven million copies were shipped across the United States.

By March 1991, the album was closing in on 10.5 million units worldwide, just six months from being released. To the Extreme was the best selling hip hop album up until that time. "Ice Ice Baby" has been credited for helping diversify hip hop by introducing it to a mainstream, white audience.

In Canada, the album peaked at number one and was certified 6 times platinum and won the Best Selling Album by a Foreign Artist at the 1992 Juno Awards.

== Track listing ==
The first version was released in 1989 by the independent record label Ichiban Records under the title Hooked. Vanilla Ice eventually signed to SBK Records, who reissued the album under its current name, To the Extreme, with some differences in the track list. To the Extreme contains all tracks from Hooked except for "Satisfaction", and six extra tracks: "Yo Vanilla", "Stop That Train", "Ice Is Workin' It", "Life Is a Fantasy" and "Juice to Get Loose Boy". "Havin' a Roni" was a hidden track on Hooked.

Hooked
No.	Title	Writer(s)	Producer(s)	Length
1.	"Ice Ice Baby"	Vanilla Ice; Earthquake; Freddie Mercury; Brian May; Roger Taylor; John Deacon; David Bowie	Vanilla Ice	4:31
2.	"Play That Funky Music"		Vanilla Ice	4:22
3.	"Hooked"	Vanilla Ice	Khayree	4:52
4.	"Satisfaction"	Vanilla Ice; Mick Jagger; Keith Richards	Khayree	3:46
5.	"I Love You"	Vanilla Ice	Kim Sharp	5:06
6.	"Dancin'"	Vanilla Ice; Earthquake	Earthquake; Khayree	5:03
7.	"Go Ill"	Vanilla Ice	David Deberry	5:00
8.	"It's a Party"	Vanilla Ice	Khayree	4:39
9.	"Ice Cold"	Vanilla Ice	Darryl Williams	4:05
10.	"Rosta Man"	Vanilla Ice	Darryl Williams	4:36
11.	"Havin' a Roni" (Hidden track)	Vanilla Ice	Vanilla Ice	1:09
Total length:				47:38

To the Extreme
No.	Title	Writer(s)	Producer(s)	Length
1.	"Ice Ice Baby"	Vanilla Ice; Earthquake; Freddie Mercury; Brian May; Roger Taylor; John Deacon; David Bowie; Mario "Chocolat" Johnson	Vanilla Ice	4:33
2.	"Yo Vanilla"	Vanilla Ice	Vanilla Ice	0:04
3.	"Stop That Train"	Vanilla Ice; Earthquake; Mario "Chocolat" Johnson	Vanilla Ice	4:31
4.	"Hooked"	Vanilla Ice	Khayree	4:52
5.	"Ice Is Workin' It"	Vanilla Ice; Earthquake; Mario "Chocolat" Johnson	Vanilla Ice	4:36
6.	"Life Is a Fantasy"	Vanilla Ice; Earthquake	Earthquake	4:47
7.	"Play That Funky Music"	Rob Parissi	Vanilla Ice	4:45
8.	"Dancin'"	Vanilla Ice; Earthquake	Earthquake; Khayree	5:00
9.	"Go Ill"	Vanilla Ice	David Deberry	4:58
10.	"It's a Party"	Vanilla Ice; Mario "Chocolat" Johnson	Khayree	4:39
11.	"Juice to Get Loose Boy"	Vanilla Ice	Vanilla Ice	0:08
12.	"Ice Cold"	Vanilla Ice	Darryl Williams	4:05
13.	"Rosta Man"	Vanilla Ice	Darryl Williams	4:36
14.	"I Love You"	Vanilla Ice	Kim Sharp	5:06
15.	"Havin' a Roni"	Vanilla Ice	Vanilla Ice	1:09
Total length:				57:18

== Personnel ==
The following people contributed on To the Extreme:

- Vanilla Ice – vocals, lyrics, producer

=== Additional musicians ===
- Paul Loomis – keyboards, producer, engineer, keyboard bass
- Craig Pride – vocals

=== Technical personnel ===
- Deshay – overdubs, beats
- George Anderson – engineer
- Tim Kimsey – engineer
- Tommy Quon – executive producer
- Kim Sharp – producer
- Stacy Brownrigg – Engineer
- Gary Wooten – engineer
- Henry Falco – engineer
- Khayree – producer
- Janet Perr – art direction, design
- Michael Lavine – photography
- Darryl Williams – producer
- Michael Sarsfield – engineer
- David DeBerry – producer, bass, keys, programming, writer

== Charts ==
=== Weekly charts ===
Chart (1990–1991)	Peak position
Australian Albums (ARIA)	9
Austrian Albums (Ö3 Austria)	8
Belgian Albums (BEA)	7
Canadian Albums (RPM)	1
Dutch Albums (Album Top 100)	17
Finnish Albums (Suomen virallinen lista)	9
French Albums (SNEP)	46
German Albums (Offizielle Top 100)	13
Irish Albums (IRMA)	7
Japanese Albums (Oricon)	60
New Zealand Albums (RMNZ)	11
Norwegian Albums (VG-lista)	11
Spanish Albums (AFE)	14
Swedish Albums (Sverigetopplistan)	17
Swiss Albums (Schweizer Hitparade)	6
UK Albums (OCC)	4
US Billboard 200	1
US Top R&B/Hip-Hop Albums (Billboard)	6
Zimbabwean Albums (ZIMA)	4

=== Year-end charts ===
Chart (1990)	Position
Canada Top Albums/CDs (RPM)	32

Chart (1991)	Position
Canada Top Albums/CDs (RPM)	8
Dutch Albums (Album Top 100)	59
German Albums (Offizielle Top 100)	61
Swiss Albums (Schweizer Hitparade)	34
US Billboard 200	6
US Top R&B/Hip-Hop Albums (Billboard)	43

=== Decade-end charts ===
Chart (1990–1999)	Position
US Billboard 200	20

== Certifications ==
Region	Certification	Certified units/sales
Australia (ARIA)	Platinum	70,000^{^}
Canada (Music Canada)	6× Platinum	600,000^{^}
France	—	90,000
New Zealand (RMNZ)	Gold	7,500^{^}
Spain (Promusicae)	Gold	50,000^{^}
Singapore	—	60,000
Switzerland (IFPI Switzerland)	Gold	25,000^{^}
United Kingdom (BPI)	Platinum	300,000^{^}
United States (RIAA)	7× Platinum	7,000,000^{^}
^{^} Shipments figures based on certification alone.
