= 12th Golden Raspberry Awards =

Award for worst cinematic under-achievements in 1991

- Date: March 29, 1992
- Site: Hollywood Roosevelt Hotel, California

Highlights
- Worst Picture: Hudson Hawk
- Most awards: Hudson Hawk (3)
- Most nominations: Cool as Ice (7)

The 12th Golden Raspberry Awards were held on March 29, 1992, at the Hollywood Roosevelt Hotel to recognize the worst the movie industry had to offer in 1991.

== Awards and nominations ==
Winner (in bold)
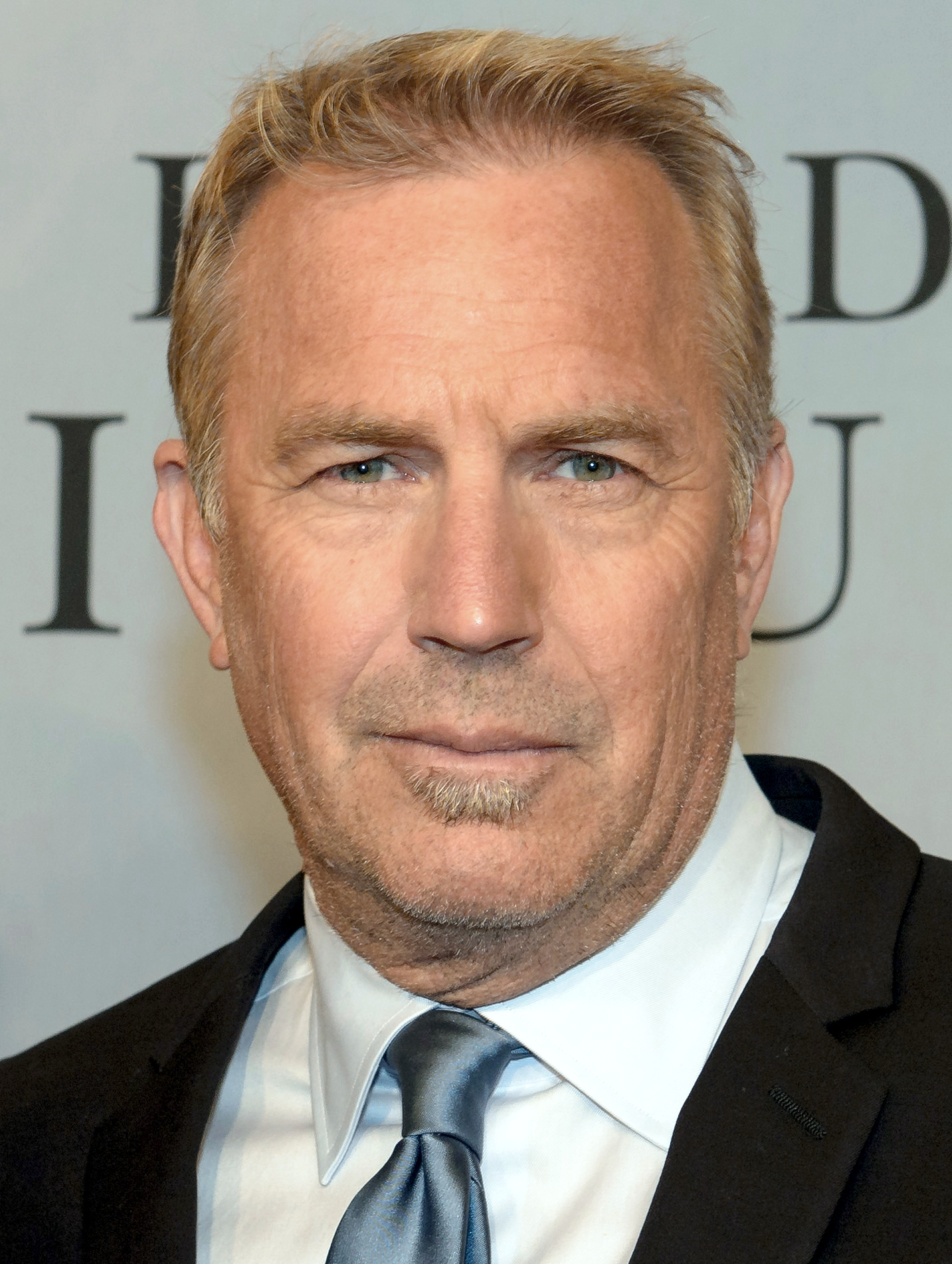
Kevin Costner, Worst Actor winner.

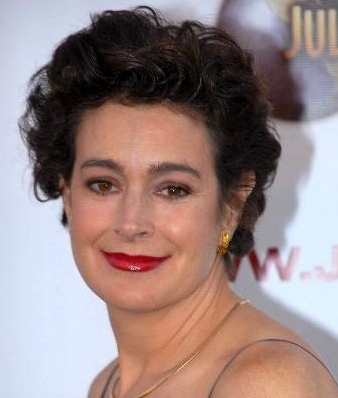
Sean Young, Worst Actress and Worst Supporting Actress winner.

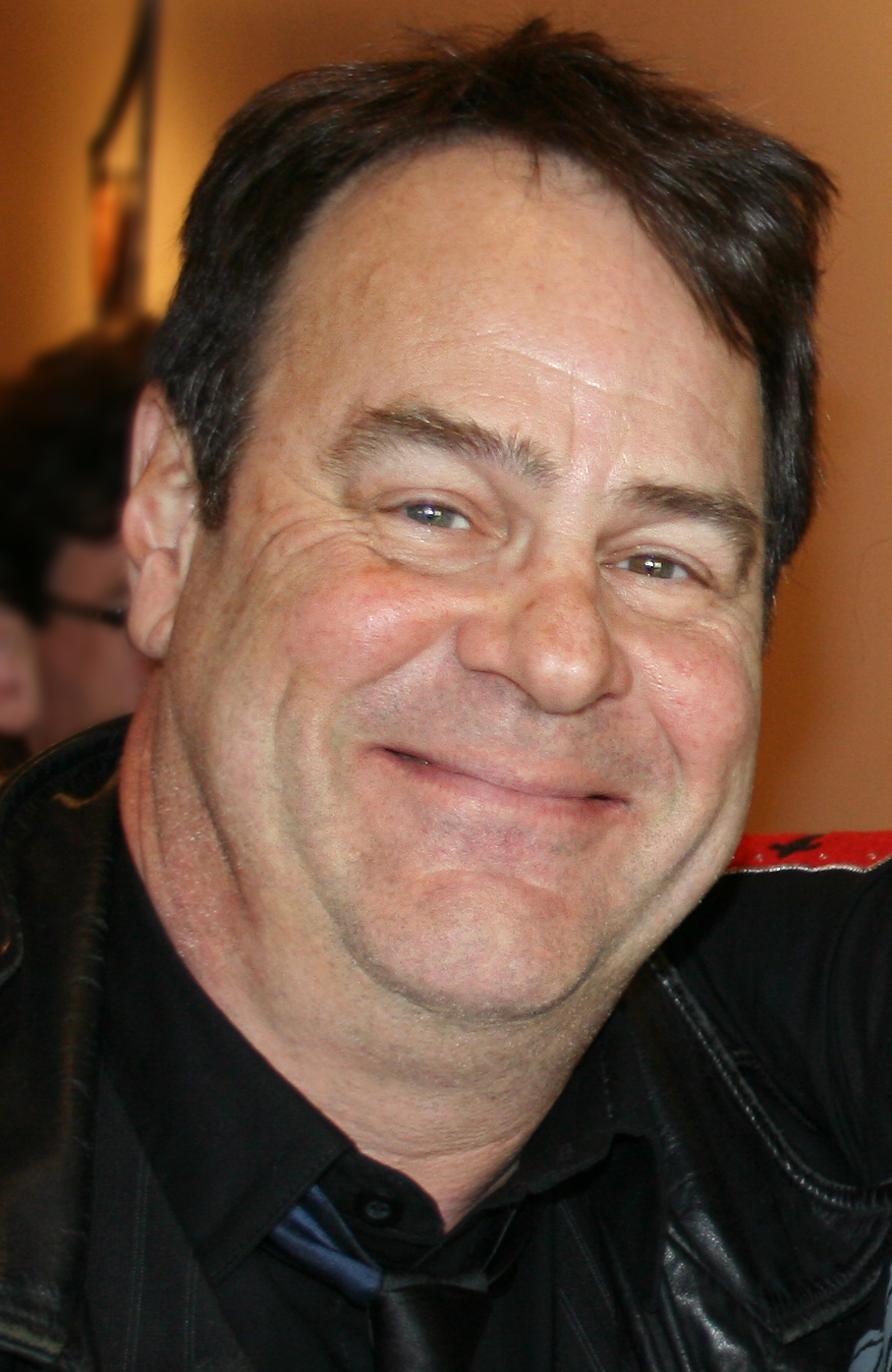
Dan Aykroyd, Worst Supporting Actor winner.

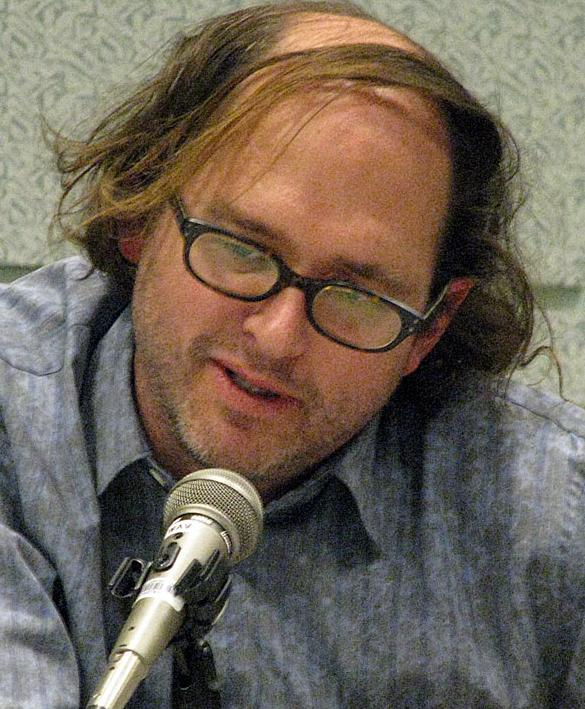
Daniel Waters, Worst Screenplay co-winner.

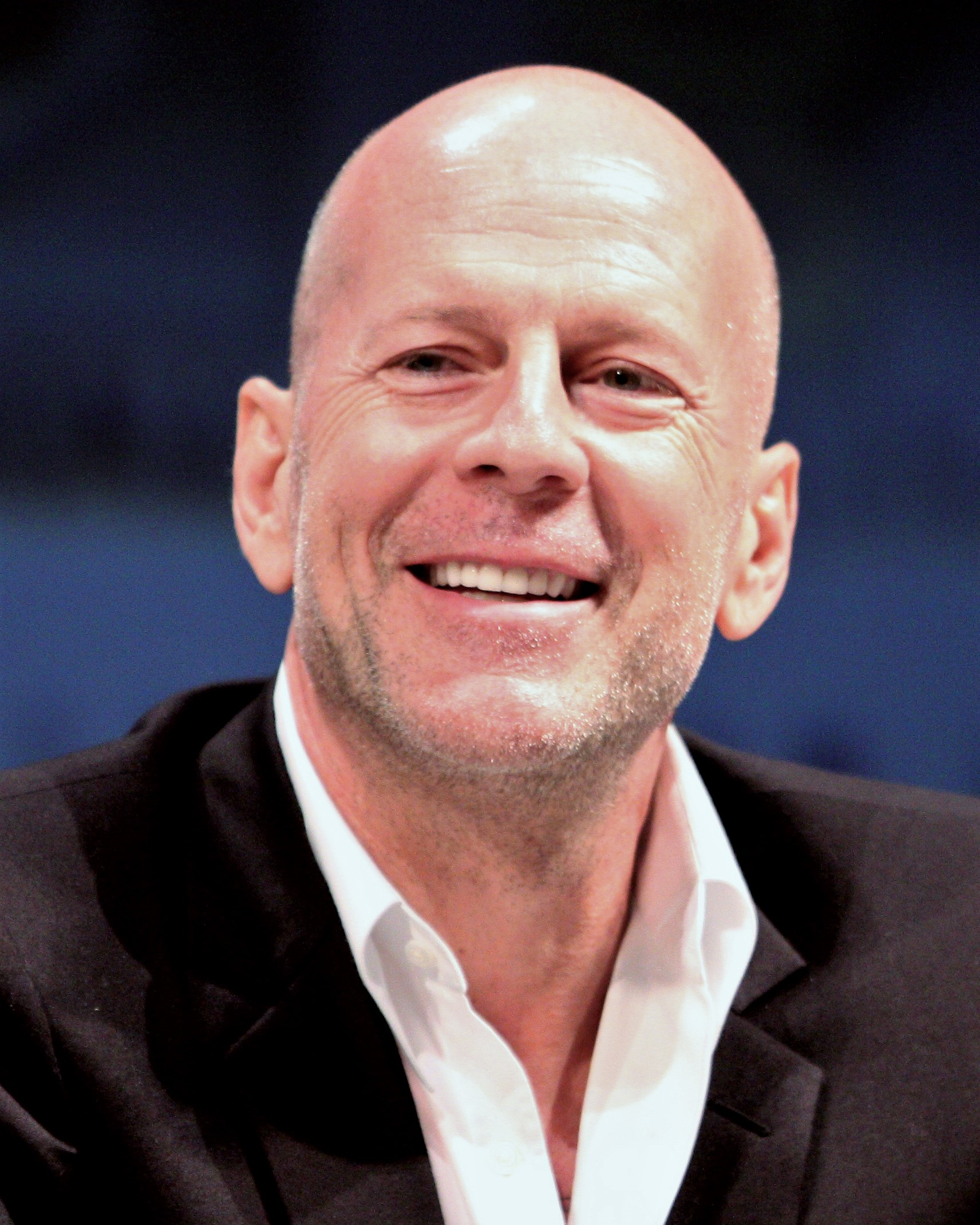
Bruce Willis, Worst Screenplay co-winner.

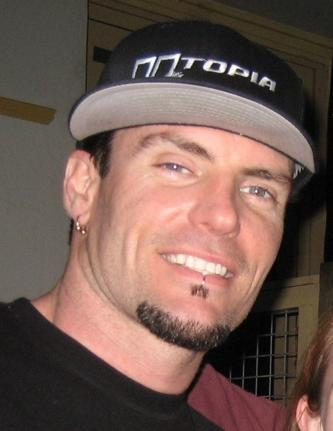
Vanilla Ice, Worst New Star winner.

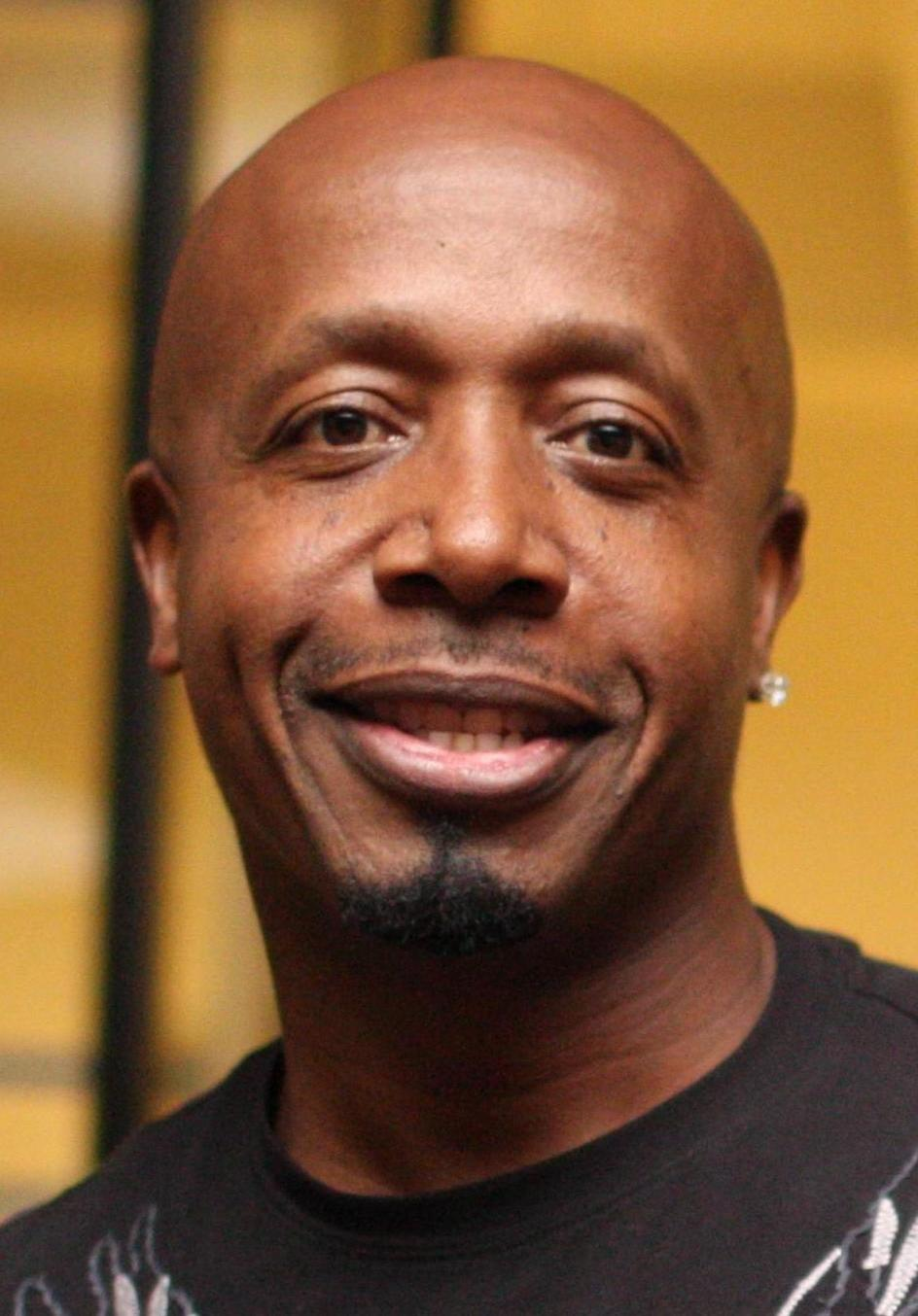
MC Hammer, Worst Original Song co-winner.

Category	Recipient
Worst Picture	**Hudson Hawk (TriStar)**
Worst Picture	Cool as Ice (Universal)
Worst Picture	Dice Rules (Seven Arts Productions/20th Century Fox)
Worst Picture	Nothing but Trouble (Warner Bros.)
Worst Picture	Return to the Blue Lagoon (Columbia)
Worst Actor	**Kevin Costner in Robin Hood: Prince of Thieves as Robin Hood**
Worst Actor	Andrew Dice Clay (as himself) in Dice Rules
Worst Actor	Sylvester Stallone in Oscar as Angelo "Snaps" Provolone
Worst Actor	Vanilla Ice in Cool as Ice as Johnny Van Owen
Worst Actor	Bruce Willis in Hudson Hawk as Eddie "Hudson Hawk" Hawkins
Worst Actress	**Sean Young (as the twin who survives) in A Kiss Before Dying as Ellen Carlsson**
Worst Actress	Kim Basinger in The Marrying Man as Vicki Anderson
Worst Actress	Sally Field in Not Without My Daughter as Betty Mahmoody
Worst Actress	Madonna (as herself) in Madonna: Truth or Dare
Worst Actress	Demi Moore in The Butcher's Wife and Nothing but Trouble as Marina Lemke and Diane Lightson (respectively)
Worst Supporting Actor	**Dan Aykroyd in Nothing but Trouble as Shire Alvin Valkenheiser/Bobo**
Worst Supporting Actor	Richard E. Grant in Hudson Hawk as Darwin Mayflower
Worst Supporting Actor	Anthony Quinn in Mobsters as Don Giuseppe Masseria
Worst Supporting Actor	Christian Slater in Mobsters and Robin Hood: Prince of Thieves as Lucky Luciano and Will Scarlet (respectively)
Worst Supporting Actor	John Travolta in Shout as Jack Cabe
Worst Supporting Actress	**Sean Young (as the twin who's murdered) in A Kiss Before Dying as Dorothy Carlsson**
Worst Supporting Actress	Sandra Bernhard in Hudson Hawk as Minerva Mayflower
Worst Supporting Actress	John Candy (in drag) in Nothing but Trouble as Eldona Valkenheiser
Worst Supporting Actress	Julia Roberts in Hook as Tinker Bell
Worst Supporting Actress	Marisa Tomei in Oscar as Lisa Provolone
Worst Director	**Michael Lehmann for Hudson Hawk**
Worst Director	Dan Aykroyd for Nothing but Trouble
Worst Director	William A. Graham for Return to the Blue Lagoon
Worst Director	David Kellogg for Cool as Ice
Worst Director	John Landis for Oscar
Worst Screenplay	**Hudson Hawk, screenplay by Steven E. de Souza and Daniel Waters, story by Bruce Willis and Robert Kraft**
Worst Screenplay	Cool as Ice, written by David Stenn
Worst Screenplay	Dice Rules, concert material written by Andrew Dice Clay; "A Day in the Life" written by Lenny Schulman, story by Clay
Worst Screenplay	Nothing but Trouble, screenplay by Dan Aykroyd, story by Peter Aykroyd
Worst Screenplay	Return to the Blue Lagoon, screenplay by Leslie Stevens, based on the novel The Garden of God by Henry De Vere Stacpoole
Worst New Star	**Vanilla Ice in Cool as Ice as Johnny Van Owen**
Worst New Star	Brian Bosworth in Stone Cold as Joe Huff/John Stone
Worst New Star	Milla Jovovich in Return to the Blue Lagoon as Lilli Hargrave
Worst New Star	Brian Krause in Return to the Blue Lagoon as Richard
Worst New Star	Kristin Minter in Cool as Ice as Kathy Winslow
Worst Original Song	**"Addams Groove" from The Addams Family, written by MC Hammer and Felton C. Pilate II**
Worst Original Song	"Cool as Ice" from Cool as Ice, written by Vanilla Ice, Gail King and Princessa
Worst Original Song	"Why Was I Born (Freddy's Dead)" from Freddy's Dead: The Final Nightmare, written by Iggy Pop and Whitey Kirst

== Films with multiple nominations ==
These films received multiple nominations:

Nominations	Films
7	Cool as Ice
6	Hudson Hawk
6	Nothing but Trouble
5	Return to the Blue Lagoon
3	Dice Rules
3	Oscar
2	A Kiss Before Dying
2	Mobsters
2	Robin Hood: Prince of Thieves

== See also ==
- 1991 in film
- 64th Academy Awards
- 45th British Academy Film Awards
- 49th Golden Globe Awards
