= Cold as Ice (disambiguation) =

"Cold as Ice" is a 1977 song by Foreigner.

Cold as Ice may also refer to:

== Literature ==
- Cold as Ice (novel), a 1992 science fiction novel by Charles Sheffield
- Cold as Ice, a novel by Anne Stuart

== Music ==
- Cold as Ice (album), an album by Charli Baltimore
- "Cold as Ice" (Sarah Connor song), 2010
- "Cold as Ice", a 2023 song by Ava Max on the album Diamonds & Dancefloors
- "Cold as Ice", a 2017 song by Blacklite District, featured on the 2017 album Instant Gratification
- "Cold as Ice", a 2001 song by No Angels on the album Elle'ments
- "Cold as Ice", a 2006 song by Nathan on the album Masterpiece
- "Cold as Ice", a 2001 song by M.O.P. on the album Warriorz
- "Cold as Ice", a song by Indigo Girls on the 2005 album Rarities

== Television ==
- "Cold as Ice", an episode of Rizzoli & Isles

== See also ==
- Cool as Ice, 1991 film starring rapper Vanilla Ice
- Cool as Ice (soundtrack), soundtrack of the film
- "Cool as Ice (Everybody Get Loose)", song from the film/soundtrack
