= Cool as Ice (soundtrack) =

Soundtrack album by various artists
- Released: October 8, 1991
- Recorded: 1991
- Genre: Hip hop; dance
- Length: 45:20
- Label: SBK Records
- Producer: Gail "Sky" King; Black Box; Chris Cuben-Tatum

Vanilla Ice chronology
Extremely Live (1991)	Cool as Ice (1991)	Mind Blowin' (1994)

Singles from Cool as Ice
- 1. "Gonna Catch You" Released: 1991; 2. "Cool as Ice (Everybody Get Loose)" Released: September 24, 1991

Professional ratings
Review scores
Source	Rating
AllMusic	2/5 stars

Cool as Ice (Original Motion Picture Soundtrack) is the soundtrack to David Kellogg's 1991 film Cool as Ice. It was released on October 8, 1991, via SBK Records. Production was handled by Gail "Sky" King and Chris Cuben-Tatum. It features contributions from the film star Vanilla Ice, alongside Derek B, Lonnie Gordon, Naomi Campbell, Partners in Kryme, Rozalla and Stanley Clarke among others.

The album peaked at number 89 on the Billboard 200. The album and film follows on after the worldwide success of To the Extreme.

The song "I Want U 2 Know" by American singer Denise Lopez was not on the official soundtrack album, although the track was one of the main themes of the film, played during the Kristin Minter scenes. The song is a power pop ballad, which was released originally in 1990 and later obtained moderate airplay during 1991 and the first half of 1992 in the United States, due to its exposure in the film.

The title track was nominated for a Razzie Award for Worst Original Song, but lost to "Addams Groove" by MC Hammer from The Addams Family.

== Track listing ==
No.	Title	Writer(s)	Producer(s)	Length
1.	"Cool as Ice (Everybody Get Loose)" (performed by Vanilla Ice and Naomi Campbell)	Robert Van Winkle; Elise King; Jennece Moore	Gail "Sky" King	5:31
2.	"Gonna Catch You" (performed by Lonnie Gordon)	Daniele Davoli; Mirko Limoni; Valerio Semplici	Black Box	3:45
3.	"You've Got to Look Up" (performed by Derek B)	Derek Boland		5:40
4.	"Love 2 Love U" (performed by Partners in Kryme and Debbe Cole)	Richard Usher Jr.; James Alpern; Donna Summer; Giorgio Moroder; Peter Bellotte		3:42
5.	"The People's Choice" (performed by Vanilla Ice)	Van Winkle; King; Moore; Sylvester Stewart	Gail "Sky" King	4:09
6.	"Never Wanna Be Without You" (performed by Vanilla Ice)	Van Winkle; King; Moore	Gail "Sky" King	3:37
7.	"Forever" (performed by D'New and Temple)	Christopher Cuben-Tatum	Chris Cuben-Tatum	4:39
8.	"Faith" (performed by Rozalla)	Nigel Swanston; Tim Cox		3:56
9.	"Drop That Zero" (performed by Stanley Clarke)	Stanley Clarke		5:13
10.	"Get Wit' It" (performed by Vanilla Ice)	Van Winkle; King; Moore	Gail "Sky" King	5:08
Total length:				45:40

=== Other songs ===
The following songs did appear in the film, but were not included in the soundtrack album:

- "Funk Boutique", written by Tony Moran and Andy Tripoli, and performed by The Cover Girls
- "Sitting in Limbo", written by Jimmy Cliff and Guilly Bright, and performed by The Bobs
- "Twilight Zone Theme", written by Marius Constant, and performed by Drew Lavyne and Jeff Bova
- "Johnny Rox the Box (Parts 1 and 2)", written by Robert Van Winkle and Gail 'Sky' King, and performed by Vanilla Ice
- "Clarinet Polka", written by Jimmy Dorsey, and performed by Stanley Clarke
- "Everybody Everybody", written by Mirko Limoni, Daniele Davoli and Valerio Semplici, and performed by Drew Lavyne and Jeff Bova
- "Crazy", written by Patrick Demeyer, Olivier Abbeloos, Daisy Rollocks, M.C. Bones and Tim Benjamin, and performed by Daisy Dee
- "I Want U 2 Know", written by Denise Lopez and Billy Biddle, and performed by Denise Lopez
- "It's My Heart That's Breaking", written by Oliver Lieber, and performed by Denise Lopez

== Charts ==
Chart (1991)	Peak position
US Billboard 200	89
