= Ice Cold (disambiguation) =

Ice Cold is a 1999 album by Choclair.

Ice Cold may also refer to:

- Ice Cold: Murder, Coffee and Jessica Wongso, a 2023 film
- "Ice Cold", a song by Half Alive from their album Now, Not Yet
- "Ice Cold", a song by Lil Tjay from his EP State of Emergency

== See also ==
- Cold as Ice (disambiguation)
