= Locke: Live at Club Moscow =

Locke: Live at Club Moscow was filmed live on August 21, 2016 when Locke took the stage of "Club Moscow" at Los Angeles' legendary Boardner's by La Belle. This was the final show of the "Blue Heart" era promoting his debut EP of the same title. The setlist includes a special performance of Jimi Hendrix's "Purple Haze." In addition to his backing band The Keys (Nick Jordan and Daniel Rudd) this concert features guest appearances from vocalist Kaleena Zanders and guitarist Travis Lee Stephenson. The film can be seen on YouTube.

== Setlist ==
1. "#ThisCouldBeUs"
2. "Give It Up"
3. "Style On Fleek"
4. "Rendezvous"
5. "Trojans"
6. "Purple Haze"
7. "KING"

== Personnel ==
=== Main ===
- Directed by Doug Locke
- Producer: Julien Lasseur
- Producer: Jamie Thalman
- Editor: Alexander Jellvi
- Production Designer: Doug Locke
- Camera Operator: Tobias Levene
- Production Assistant: Bernice Fonge
- Production Assistant: Elizabeth Ramirez
- Lighting Design Scoti
- Live Sound Mix: Matt Lowry
- Sound Mix and Master: Eric Lee McNeely
- Colorist: Patrick Maxwell

=== Band ===
- Guitar: Daniel Rudd
- Drums: Nick Jordan
- Guest Vocalist: Kaleena Zanders
- Guest Guitar: Travis Stephenson
