= Jules Bruff =

American actress and filmmaker

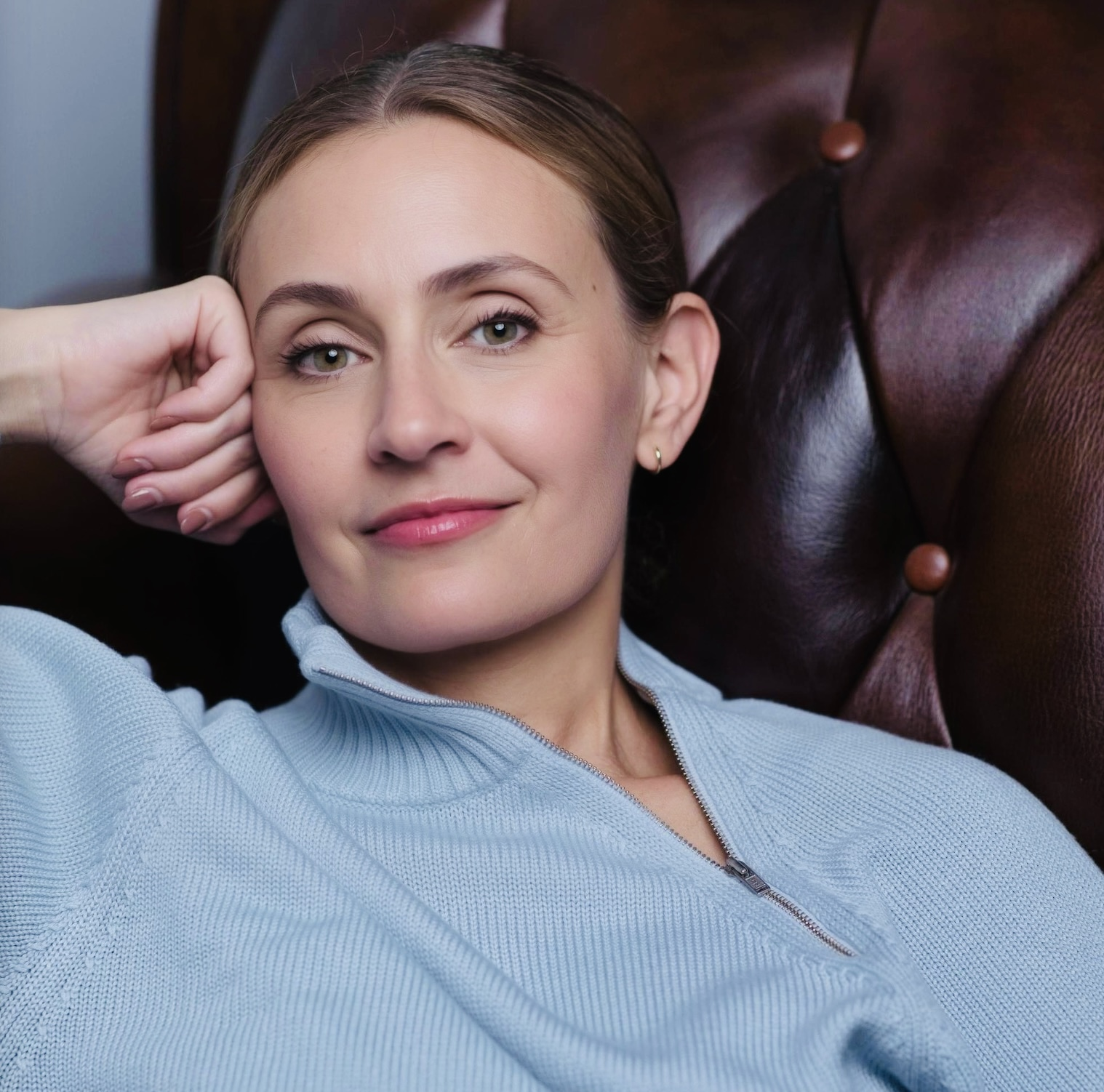
- Born: Julie Anne Bruff; January 10, 1973 (age 53); Cheyenne, Wyoming, U.S.
- Occupations: Actress, screenwriter, producer
- Years active: 2001–present
- Notable work: Zodiac

Jules Bruff (born January 10, 1973) is an American actress and filmmaker. She is known for her portrayal of Catherine Allen in David Fincher's 2007 film Zodiac.

== Biography ==
Bruff was born in Cheyenne, Wyoming, and raised in Oakland, California, she earned a BFA in Acting from the University of Colorado. Her career began with a lead role in the feature film Virginia.

She has appeared in films such as Zodiac (2007) and Part Time Fabulous (2011), for which she won Best Actress Awards at the Monaco Film Festival and the Feel Good Film Festival. She has also worked in television, theater, and over 70 national commercial campaigns.

Bruff co-wrote, produced, and stars in Good Side of Bad, a drama based on Beverly Olevin’s book, portraying Sara, a sister supporting a family member with mental illness.

Bruff cast her father, Clyde J. Bruff, in his final film, Good Side of Bad.

== Awards and nominations ==
Year	Award	Category	Work	Result
2011	Monaco Charity Film Festival	Best Actress in a Feature Film	Part Time Fabulous	Won
2011	Feel Good Film Festival, Hollywood	Best Actress	Part Time Fabulous	Won
2011	Berkshire International Film Festival	Audience Award – Narrative Feature	Part Time Fabulous	Won
2012	Awareness Film Festival, CA	Audience Award – Best Narrative Feature	Part Time Fabulous	Won
2012	Durango Film Festival	Special Jury Commendation (Feature)	Part Time Fabulous	Won
2018	Best Shorts Competition	Award of Merit Special Mention (Ensemble Cast)	I'm Here	Won
2018	Chicago Comedy Film Festival	Best Ensemble Short Film	For Muriel	Won
2018	Independent Shorts Awards	Bronze Award – Best Acting Ensemble	I'm Here	Won
2019	Vegas Movie Awards	Award of Excellence – Best Ensemble	I'm Here	Won
2023	Awareness Film Festival, CA	Grand Jury Award – Feature Narrative	Good Side of Bad	Won
2023	Festival of Cinema NYC	Audience Choice Award for Best Feature	Good Side of Bad	Won
2023	Festival of Cinema NYC	Best Feature Narrative	Good Side of Bad	Nominated
2023	Festival of Cinema NYC	Best Ensemble	Good Side of Bad	Nominated
2023	Albuquerque Film & Music Experience	Best Narrative Feature Film	Good Side of Bad	Nominated
2024	Block Island Film Festival	Lighthouse Award – Best Feature Film	Good Side of Bad	Won
2024	Block Island Film Festival	Lighthouse Award – Best Screenplay	Good Side of Bad	Won

== Filmography ==
=== Film ===
Year	Title	Role
1998	What Ever Happened to Kathy	Sara
1998	Virginia	Virginia Culver
2000	Chuck & Buck	Auditioning Actress
2004	Illusion	Renee
2005	Complete Guide to Guys	Lady Who Lunches
2007	Zodiac	Catherine Allen
2007	The Poughkeepsie Tapes	Blinker
2009	Stellina Blue	Kamand's Nurse
2009	Bob Funk	Ms. Agnew
2009	Endless Bummer	Carol
2011	Part Time Fabulous	Mel - Actor / Writer / Producer
2011	How to Cheat	Annie Sexton
2014	Looking for Lions	Julie
2015	Excess Flesh	Police Officer Marie
2017	The Portal	Commissioner Banks
2017	The Tank	Commissioner Banks
2017	Market Value	Audrey Stewart
2017	High & Outside: A Baseball Noir	Amy Harding
2018	Something's More Than One Thing	Knowing Woman
2018	I'm Here	Mom
2020	Starf*cker	Deanna
2020	False Mirror	Susan
2025	Good Side of Bad	Sara - Actor / Writer / PGA Producer

=== Television ===
Year	Title	Role	Notes
2008	Eli Stone	Anna	Episode: 'Wake Me Up Before You Go-Go"
2008	Eleventh Hour	Flight Attendant	Episode: "Titans"
2010	Svetlana	Saleswoman	Episode: "Yellowcake"
2018	Waco	Reporter	Miniseries
2018	Turnt	Cherry Charlie's Mom	Episode: 'It's Complicated"
2019	S.W.A.T.	Mrs. Steinburg	Episode: "Invisible"
2019	Lucifer	Nurse	Episode: "Who's da New King of Hell?"
