= The Poughkeepsie Tapes =

2007 American pseudo-documentary horror film

- Theatrical release poster with original release date
- Directed by: John Erick Dowdle
- Screenplay by: John Erick Dowdle
- Story by: John Erick Dowdle; Drew Dowdle
- Produced by: Drew Dowdle
- Cinematography: Shawn Dufraine
- Edited by: John Erick Dowdle
- Music by: Keefus Ciancia
- Production company: Brothers/Dowdle Productions
- Distributed by: Metro-Goldwyn-Mayer
- Release dates: April 27, 2007 (Tribeca Film Festival); October 10, 2017 (United States)
- Running time: 80 minutes
- Country: United States
- Language: English

The Poughkeepsie Tapes is a 2007 American pseudo-documentary horror film written, directed, and edited by John Erick Dowdle from a story he co-wrote with his brother Drew Dowdle. It revolves around a serial killer's murders in Poughkeepsie, New York, told through interviews and footage from a cache of the killer's snuff films.

The film premiered at the 2007 Tribeca Film Festival, but had a troubled release history; it was originally slated for theatrical release by Metro-Goldwyn-Mayer in February 2008, but was removed from the release schedule. The film had a brief video-on-demand release in 2014, but remained unavailable on home media. In October 2017, the film was released and remastered on DVD and Blu-ray by Shout! Factory via the newly-revived Orion Pictures.

== Plot ==
The film is presented as a documentary, featuring interviews with police and FBI officials.

Police officers raid a house in Poughkeepsie, New York, where they discover over 800 videotapes created by serial killer Edward Carver, (Note: Though not named in the film, the killer is credited as "Edward Carver" and uses the name "Ed" when picked up as a hitchhiker.) which present a visual record of his murders from the abduction to the post-mortem mutilation of the victim. Despite the volume of evidence, Carver is careful not to be shown on film unless fully disguised, leading to police and law enforcement beginning an investigation into the whereabouts of both him and his victims.

The first tape shows Carver abducting, raping, and murdering an eight-year-old girl. After the success of his first crime, he becomes more meticulous. He convinces a couple, the Andersons, to give him a ride before knocking the man out and subduing the woman with chloroform. He then performs a C-section on the woman, placing the severed head of her husband inside her womb before sewing her up, waking her, and filming her reaction. Carver shows himself in the CCTV footage of another gas station, using sign language to reveal the location of the bodies. He made this message before committing the crime.

Carver's next victim is teenager Cheryl Dempsey. He murders and mutilates her boyfriend Tim and imprisons her in his basement, abusing her sexually, physically, and psychologically as his "slave". Her mother Victoria appeals to her kidnapper in a televised statement. He goes to see her, offering to help while filming her. Victoria realizes that he is her daughter's captor and stands shocked as he laughs and flees.

With his crimes gaining a rising level of attention, Carver changes his MO and begins targeting sex workers while posing as a policeman; he is dubbed the "Water Street Butcher". The police investigating the murders are led to officer James Foley, who has a history of hiring sex workers, is mentioned in eyewitness statements, has no alibi, and has matching sperm samples. He is convicted and sentenced to death in 1996. Foley continues to plead his innocence and refuses to make any plea deals. He is executed by lethal injection on September 9, 2001. Days later, his former partner finds a map in his mailbox with the location of another body. The real killer had presumably taken Foley's sperm from a fertility clinic and framed him. Foley is posthumously exonerated of the murders on September 12, but because of its proximity to the September 11 attacks, this goes unrecognized by the public.

After another murder, the police reverse-engineer the killer's map search and Cheryl is discovered in his empty house. She is rescued but is irreversibly damaged from her ordeal, suffering from malnourishment and harming herself in secret. In an interview, she identifies with her captor and defends him, saying that he loved her. Two weeks later, she dies by suicide. After an exhumation, there is only a tape left in her empty coffin. The investigators ponder where Carver is and assert that he will watch the documentary. A post-credits scene shows a brutalized woman being filmed by Carver, who says he will let her live as long as she does not blink. As soon as she does, the film cuts to black.

== Cast ==
- Stacy Chbosky as Cheryl Dempsey
- Ben Messmer as Edward Carver
- Ivar Brogger as Leonard Schway
- Lou George as Felton Lewis
- Michael Lawson as Simon Alray
- Samantha Robson as Samantha Baker
- Ron Harper as Mike Moakes
- Kim Kenny as Pam Frears
- Bobbi Sue Luther as Josephine
- Iris Bahr as Aretha Creely
- Lisa Black as Victoria Dempsey
- Bill Bookston as James Foley
- Jules Bruff as Joanne Blackwell
- Todd Cahoon as Ted Bundy
- Meredith Cross as Jeannette Anderson
- Henry Dittman as Frank Anderson
- Dennis Garber as Joseph Danvers
- Chip Godwin as Hank Foley
- David Haack as Tim Surrey
- Keisuke Hoashi as Dai Loung

== Production ==
=== Development ===
The Poughkeepsie Tapes was developed by brothers John Erick and Drew Dowdle, who devised the story, with Drew completing the formal screenplay. John commented on the genesis of the project:

We were trying to find a way where we could make a lower budget movie that looked like it cost more money to make. We were thinking it’d be ideal if we could do something that had video aspects and film aspects. And you know, we were sort of brainstorming and I said, ‘What if we did a faux documentary on a serial killer’s home movies?’ And Drew was like, ‘That’s it.’ We were actually comedy people before that, and we didn’t know if we could actually do this. Do a horror film, or anything scary. And Drew said, basically, ‘Drop everything. You should write that. I’ll put the money together. And we’ll make this.’ [S]ix months later, we had shot the whole movie.

Drew Dowdle commented that the brothers chose to set the film in New York's Hudson Valley due to the setting having the "beautiful river, stately homes, but then it has this distinct dichotomy of seedy elements. It's a collision of two worlds there that is very stark." Drew had been familiar with the region after visiting a friend who was attending the Culinary Institute of America in Hyde Park.

=== Casting ===
Stacy Chbosky, the wife of director John Erick Dowdle, was cast in the film's central role as Cheryl Dempsey, a kidnap victim of serial killer Edward Carver. In preparation for the part, Chbosky studied the crimes of Gary M. Heidnik, a killer and serial rapist in Philadelphia who held female victims captive in his home. Chbosky described the development of her character as organic and collaborative, as she and John, who had recently begun living together, would present ideas to one another and discuss the material during the initial development stages of the project.

=== Filming ===
The Poughkeepsie Tapes was shot over a period of fifteen days in 2005, with the majority of filming taking place in Los Angeles. Exterior and establishing shots were shot on location in Poughkeepsie, New York during the Halloween weekend 2005.

The film's setting drew some commentators to assume the film was based on the crimes of Kendall Francois, a local Poughkeepsie serial killer, but the Dowdles claimed this was coincidental and that his crimes were not the basis of the film.

== Release ==
The Poughkeepsie Tapes premiered at the Tribeca Film Festival on April 27, 2007. It was scheduled for a theatrical release by Metro-Goldwyn-Mayer (MGM) on February 8, 2008. The film, however, was removed from the release schedule, in spite of promotional advertising.

In 2010, a rough cut of the film was leaked on the internet.

In July 2014, the film was given its first official release as a video-on-demand title available through DirecTV. It was subsequently pulled again less than a month later with Dowdle suggesting that MGM was considering a wider release.

=== Home media ===
The film was released in a multi-format DVD and Blu-ray set by Scream Factory on October 10, 2017. The Blu-ray and DVD set grossed $174,304 in sales.

== Reception ==
Michael Gingold, writing for Fangoria, criticized the film for failing to provide an explanation for the killer's crimes, noting that: "What's missing is a sense that the mockumentary approach is being used to say something fresh about serial killers or, indeed, the tropes of non-fiction filmmaking itself." He did, however, praise the film's realism and effectiveness, commenting: "Both the documentary stylings of the filmmaking and the naturalistic performances are persuasive, and the excerpts from the killer's cassettes, particularly those devoted to Cheryl's extreme mistreatment, are properly upsetting and horrifying." Bloody Disgusting gave the film a score of 4 out of 5, calling it "one of the best indie films" of 2007 and writing that "the movie is scary, creepy, unnerving, bizarre and very uncomfortable to watch."

Brian Orndorf of Blu-ray.com gave the film a rating of 4 out of 10 stars, writing that the film "teases a few interesting directions" but "loses tension the longer it recycles the same beats of distress, selecting a cheap way to disturb its audience."

Michele "Izzy" Galgana of ScreenAnarchy called it "definitely not a film for everyone, particularly those who have a low threshold for violence and torture. For those who love true crime and found footage films, [The Poughkeepsie Tapes] is a treasure."

== See also ==
- List of films featuring psychopaths and sociopaths
