= Hudson Hawk =

1991 American film by Michael Lehmann

- Theatrical release poster
- Directed by: Michael Lehmann
- Screenplay by: Steven E. de Souza; Daniel Waters
- Story by: Bruce Willis; Robert Kraft
- Produced by: Joel Silver
- Starring: Bruce Willis; Danny Aiello; Andie MacDowell; Richard E. Grant; Sandra Bernhard; Donald Burton; James Coburn
- Cinematography: Dante Spinotti
- Edited by: Chris Lebenzon; Michael Tronick
- Music by: Michael Kamen; Robert Kraft
- Production company: Silver Pictures
- Distributed by: Tri-Star Pictures
- Release date: May 24, 1991
- Running time: 100 minutes
- Country: United States
- Language: English
- Budget: $65 million
- Box office: $97 million

Hudson Hawk is a 1991 American action comedy film directed by Michael Lehmann. Bruce Willis stars in the title role and also co-wrote the story. Danny Aiello, Andie MacDowell, James Coburn, David Caruso, Lorraine Toussaint, Frank Stallone, Sandra Bernhard and Richard E. Grant are also featured.

The live action film employs cartoon-style slapstick heavily, including sound effects, which enhances the film's signature surreal humor. The plot combines material based on conspiracy theories, secret societies and historic mysteries, as well as outlandish "clockpunk" technology à la Coburn's Our Man Flint films of the 1960s.

A recurring plot device in the film has Hudson Hawkins and his partner Tommy "Five-Tone" Messina (Aiello) singing songs concurrently but separately, to time and synchronize their exploits. Willis-Aiello duets of Bing Crosby's "Swinging on a Star" and Paul Anka's "Side by Side" are featured on the film's soundtrack.

Hudson Hawk was released by Tri-Star Pictures on May 24, 1991. The film was a huge critical and commercial failure in the United States, only grossing $17 million and earning three Golden Raspberry Awards, including Worst Picture, but it was better received internationally and grossed $80 million for a worldwide total of $97 million and it eventually amassed a cult following.

== Plot ==
Eddie Hawkins—"Hudson Hawk", from the bracing winds off the Hudson—is a master cat burglar and safe-cracker with a penchant for using low-tech solutions against high-tech security systems. He is also known for conducting his robberies with precise, synchronized timing, later revealed to be a robust catalog of memorized music that he and his partner(s) sing along with during jobs.

Upon Hawk's release from prison, and on his first day of parole, he and his former partner, Tommy "Five-Tone" Messina, seek out a good cup of cappuccino. However, before Hawk can drink it, he is blackmailed by various entities. These include his parole officer, the minor Mario Brothers Mafia family and the CIA, who push him into doing a few art heists. Hawk refuses each, despite mounting pressure and coercion, stating that his only natural desires are to remain out of prison and enjoy a good cup of cappuccino—though he is repeatedly interrupted before doing so. Hawk eventually relents and proceeds to case the art pieces.

Unbeknownst to Hawk, his blackmailers are all manipulated by the American corporation Mayflower Industries, run by husband and wife Darwin and Minerva Mayflower and their butler Alfred. Headquartered in the Palazzo della Civiltà Italiana, inside of the Esposizione Universale Roma, the company seeks to take over the world by building La Macchina dell'Oro, a machine invented by Leonardo da Vinci that converts lead into gold.

An assembly of crystals needed for the machine to function are hidden in Leonardo's artworks: the maquette of the Sforza, the Da Vinci Codex, and a scale model of da Vinci's helicopter. Sister Anna Baragli is an operative for a secret Vatican counter-espionage agency, working with the CIA to assist in Hawk's mission in Rome, intending to foil the robbery at St. Peter's.

After blowing up an auctioneer to cover up the theft of the Sforza, the Mario Bros. take Hawk away in an ambulance. He sticks syringes into Antony Mario's face and falls out of the ambulance on a gurney on the Brooklyn Bridge, and they try to run him down with the ambulance as they speed along the highway. The brothers get killed when their ambulance crashes. Immediately afterward, Hawk meets CIA head George Kaplan and four codenamed agents (Snickers, Kit Kat, Almond Joy and Butterfinger) who take him to the Mayflowers.

Hawk successfully steals the Da Vinci Codex from another museum, but later refuses to steal the helicopter design. Tommy fakes his death so they can escape. They are discovered and attacked by the CIA agents; Kaplan reveals that he and his agents stole the piece but, unlike them, had no problem killing the guards. Hawk and Tommy escape when Snickers and Almond Joy are killed and pursue the remaining agents. Kit Kat and Butterfinger take Anna to the castle where the Macchina dell'Oro is reconstructed.

The showdown is in the castle between the remaining CIA agents, the Mayflowers, and the team of Hudson, Five-Tone and Baragli. Minerva kills Kit Kat and Butterfinger, although Kit Kat frees Baragli before dying. Tommy fights Darwin and Alfred inside a speeding limousine and Hudson fights George Kaplan on the castle's roof. Kaplan topples from the castle, landing on the limousine. Alfred plants a bomb in it, escaping with Darwin; Tommy gets trapped inside while Kaplan is hanging onto the hood. The bomb detonates as the limousine speeds over a cliff.

Darwin and Minerva force Hawk to assemble the crystal powering the machine, but he intentionally leaves out one small piece. When the machine is activated, it malfunctions and explodes, killing the Mayflowers. Hawk battles Alfred, using his blades to decapitate him. Hawk and Baragli escape the castle using the da Vinci flying machine. Baragli implies she will be leaving her order to watch out for Hawk. They discover Tommy waiting for them at a café, having miraculously escaped death through a combination of airbags and a sprinkler system in the limo. With the world saved and da Vinci's secrets protected, Hawk finally enjoys a cappuccino.

== Cast ==
- Bruce Willis as Eddie "Hudson Hawk" Hawkins
- Danny Aiello as Tommy "Five-Tone" Messina
- Andie MacDowell as Anna Baragli
- James Coburn as George Kaplan
- Richard E. Grant as Darwin Mayflower
- Sandra Bernhard as Minerva Mayflower
- Donald Burton as Alfred
- Don Harvey as "Snickers"
- David Caruso as "Kit Kat"
- Andrew Bryniarski as "Butterfinger"
- Lorraine Toussaint as "Almond Joy"
- Burtt Harris as Gates
- Frank Stallone as Cesar Mario
- Carmine Zozzora as Antony Mario
- Stefano Molinari as Leonardo da Vinci
- Enrico Lo Verso as The Apprentice
- Remo Remotti as Donkey Man
- Giselda Volodi as Mona Lisa
- John Savident as Auctioneer
- Doug Martin as Igg
- Steven M. Martin as Ook
- Leonardo Cimino as Cardinal
- Frank Welker as Bunny (voice)
- William Conrad as Narrator (voice)

== Production ==
Before Bruce Willis became a full-time actor, he had worked at a bar in New York City. One of the regulars at the bar was Robert Kraft, who worked with Willis on putting a song together called "The Hudson Hawk", with Kraft being inspired by a strong wind that blew from the Hudson River across Manhattan in the fall. Eventually, when Willis became a star, he went back to the idea of doing a super sleuth film, one that Kraft thought could be "the anti-James Bond", with potential for follow-up films.

Joel Silver, who had produced the first two Die Hard films starring Willis, came aboard to produce this film. Maruschka Detmers was originally cast opposite Willis, but suffered a back injury and had to depart the role, which saw Andie MacDowell cast. Michael Lehmann, director of films such as Heathers (which had been written by Daniel Waters, who was hired to co-write the screenplay), envisioned Richard E. Grant and Sandra Bernhard as playing manic villains Darwin and Minerva Mayflower, with Darwin inspired by Silver.

The budget reportedly went from $42 million to around $70 million to go with constant on-set rewriting and rumors of turbulence with producer-star Willis. It was shot in Italy, England and Hungary. Grant, who spent four months on the production, wrote about his experiences making the films in his book With Nails, listing stories, such as Willis continuously watching his close-ups on the video replay monitors after takes, and Danny Aiello wanting re-writes for the climax.

== Soundtrack ==
The soundtrack album was released by Varèse Sarabande in 1991. There are eleven tracks. The film's score, represented by tracks 4–9, was composed and conducted by Michael Kamen with Robert Kraft. Kraft also wrote "Hawk Swing" and co-wrote the film's theme with star Bruce Willis.

1. "Hudson Hawk Theme" – Dr. John (05:38)
2. "Swinging on a Star" – Bruce Willis and Danny Aiello (02:53) – Sung in incorrect order of verses (the plot device in the movie refers to the original track length as 5:32)
3. "Side by Side" – Bruce Willis and Danny Aiello (02:18) (the plot device in the film refers to the original track length as 6:00)
4. "Leonardo" (04:55)
5. "Welcome to Rome" (01:46)
6. "Stealing the Codex" (01:58)
7. "Igg and Ook" (02:22)
8. "Cartoon Fight" (02:54)
9. "The Gold Room" (05:57)
10. "Hawk Swing" (03:41)
11. "Hudson Hawk Theme" (instrumental) (05:18)

The song "The Power" by Snap! is featured, although not included on the soundtrack, when Hudson Hawk is taken for the first time to the headquarters of the Mayflowers. Minerva Mayflower, played by Sandra Bernhard, is sitting on a desk and sings the song while it plays on her headphones.

== Reception ==
On the review aggregator website Rotten Tomatoes, 22% of 130 critics' reviews are positive. The website's consensus reads: "Hudson Hawk's kitchen-sink approach to its blend of action and slapstick results in a surreal, baffling misfire." Metacritic, which uses a weighted average, assigned the film a score of 17 out of 100, based on 15 critics, indicating "overwhelming dislike". Audiences polled by CinemaScore gave the film an average grade of "C+" on an A+ to F scale.

In the Chicago Tribune, Terry Clifford observed that: "The end result is being thrown up on selected screens this weekend, and the suspicion that this was a pooch turns out to be undeniably correct. Boring and banal, overwrought and undercooked, Hudson Hawk is beyond bad".

As Kenneth Turan wrote in the Los Angeles Times:

The saddest thing about Hudson Hawk is that director Lehmann and co-screenwriter Waters were previously responsible for the clever, audacious Heathers, a film that represented all that is most promising about American film, while this one represents all that is most moribund and retrograde. Perhaps they both earned enough money here so that they won't be tempted to indulge themselves in similar big-budget fiascoes. Here's hoping.

Roger Ebert and Gene Siskel gave the film a "two thumbs down" review on their At the Movies TV show. Ebert described the film as a complete disaster: "Every line starts from zero and gets nowhere". Ebert said that he watched it "in appalled silence", and didn't laugh once throughout the entire film. Siskel's review was marginally more positive, saying that Willis had a few funny moments and that the film might have been salvaged if Willis and Aiello had been the only zany characters against a cast of straight men, as opposed to a cast full of overacting, where everyone tried too hard to make each line funny.

Variety called the film "a relentlessly annoying clay duck that crash-lands in a sea of wretched excess and silliness. Those willing to check their brains at the door may find sparse amusement". Peter Travers of Rolling Stone said of the film: "A movie this unspeakably awful can make an audience a little crazy. You want to throw things, yell at the actors, beg them to stop". James Brundage of AMC filmcritic said that the film was "so implausible and so over the top that it lets inconsistency roll off like water on a duck's back".

Janet Maslin in The New York Times called the film "a colossally sour and ill-conceived misfire" and denounced the film for "smirky, mean-spirited cynicism". Writing in The Washington Post, Joe Brown said: "To say this megamillion Bruce Willis vehicle doesn't fly is understatement in the extreme... Hudson Hawk offers a klutzy, charmless hero, and wallows dully in limp slapstick and lowest common denominator crudeness". Chris Hicks wrote in the Deseret News: "What is most amazing is the pervasive silliness that has the cast acting like fools without ever getting a laugh from the audience. It's hard to imagine a major, big-budget movie that could come along this year and be worse than Hudson Hawk, a solid contender for the longest 95 minutes in movie history". Owen Gleiberman in Entertainment Weekly called the film "a fiasco sealed with a smirk".

Jo Berry from Empire gave it three out of five stars, noting that it "reached UK screens with the added burden of having been slaughtered by US critics who likened it to famous big-budget turkeys like Raise the Titanic and Ishtar. True, the film has its flaws, but the positives do outweigh the negatives, with Bruce Willis at his wisecracking best in the title role". Jane Lamacraft reassessed the film as one of the "Forgotten Pleasures of the Multiplex" for Sight & Sound's June 2011 magazine.

=== Box office ===
The film performed poorly in the United States, partly because the film was intended as an absurd comedy, yet was marketed as an action film one year after the success of Die Hard 2. It grossed only $17 million in the United States and Canada. By the end of its theatrical run, the film had lost the studio an estimated $90 million. Internationally, and on home video, it performed much better, eventually grossing $80 million, for a worldwide total of $97 million. By 1995, it had started to pay out to profit participants, including Bruce Willis.

=== Accolades ===
The film received three Golden Raspberry Awards including Worst Picture, Worst Director (Lehmann) and Worst Screenplay and with additional nominations for Worst Actor (Willis), Worst Supporting Actor (Grant) and Worst Supporting Actress (Bernhard) at the 12th Golden Raspberry Awards. It was also nominated for Worst Picture at the 1991 Stinkers Bad Movie Awards, losing to Nothing but Trouble.

== Home media ==
The film was released on VHS and LaserDisc in late 1991. Upon its home video release, the tagline "Catch the Excitement, Catch the Adventure, Catch the Hawk" was changed to "Catch the Adventure, Catch The Laughter, Catch the Hawk". Despite the film's failure at the US box office, the film was successful on home video.

It was released twice on DVD, first in 1999 and again in 2007 with new extras. In 2013, Mill Creek Entertainment released Hudson Hawk on Blu-ray for the first time; it was included in a set with Hollywood Homicide. All extras were dropped for the latter release.

== Video game ==
In 1991, a video game based on the film was released under the title Hudson Hawk for various home computers and game consoles. Sony Imagesoft released versions of the game for the NES and Game Boy. Ocean Software released it for the Commodore 64, Amiga, ZX Spectrum, Amstrad CPC, and Atari ST. It is a side-scrolling game where the player, as the Hawk, must steal the Sforza and the Codex from the auction house and the Vatican, respectively. Then, Castle Da Vinci has to be infiltrated to steal the mirrored crystal needed to power the gold machine. On his journey, Hawk must face many oddball adversaries, including dachshunds that try to throw him off the roof of the auction house, janitors, photographers, killer nuns and a tennis player, presumably Darwin Mayflower.

== See also ==
- Cultural references to Leonardo da Vinci

Awards
Preceded by Ghosts Can't Do It and The Adventures of Ford Fairlane	Razzie Award for Worst Picture; 12th Golden Raspberry Awards	Succeeded by Shining Through
