= Doug Locke =

American singer-songwriter

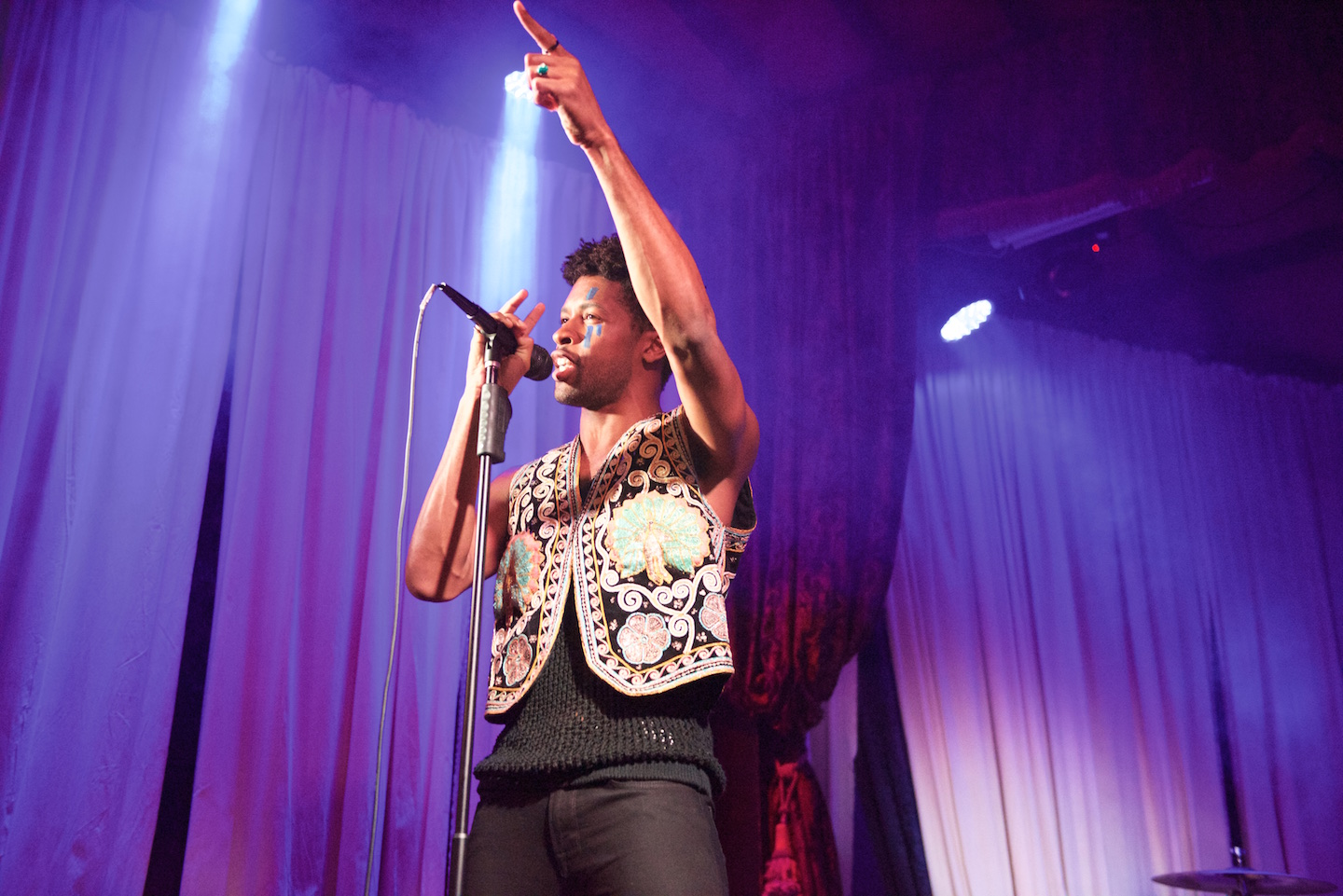
- Locke performing in Hollywood, California

Background information
- Also known as: Locke
- Born: April 7 Houston, Texas, U.S.
- Genres: Pop, R&B, dance
- Occupation: Singer-songwriter
- Instruments: Vocals, guitar
- Years active: 2013–present
- Website: www.douglockemusic.com

Doug Locke is an American singer-songwriter, actor, and producer based in Los Angeles, CA. His music blends Pop, Alternative R&B, Dance and Rock. Locke has released the albums Blue Heart and Phoenix, and has received coverage from publications including Billboard, The Huffington Post, American Songwriter, AFROPUNK, OUT, and PopMatters. In addition to his recording career, he is the creator and host of Doug Locke’s Rock ’n’ Roll Cabaret, a recurring live music and variety show on the Sunset Strip in West Hollywood, California.

== Early life and education ==
Locke is the son of former Houston City Attorney and Commissioner Gene Locke and Aubrey Locke. He is one of five children, including actress Tembi Locke and writer Attica Locke. His uncle is Olympic Gold medalist Frederick Newhouse.

Locke developed an interest in the performing arts at an early age. He participated in theatre and dance summer camps throughout his childhood. After high school, Locke moved to Los Angeles where he earned a bachelor's degree in Theater Arts from Occidental College. While studying theatre, Locke appeared in multiple productions including: The Crucible, Blues for Alabama Sky, The Pajama Game and She Stoops to Conquer.

During his time at Occidental College, Locke began performing at open mic events and talent showcases. He began to garner a following based on his elaborate stage shows the featured choreography, wardrobe changes, provocative themes and even once a burning guitar.

== Career ==
Locke has continued to work as an actor alongside his music career, appearing in fil, television, and commercial projects while maintainimg an active career as a recording artist and live performer.

== Acting ==
Locke was inspired to enter the entertainment industry professionally by the work of his sisters, Tembi Locke (actress) and Attica Locke (writer). He began his career in film and television when he portrayed a young Jimi Hendrix in the Silver Lake Film Festival award-winning short, "A Technicolor Dream". In addition to numerous commercials, pilots and shorts, he most recently appeared in episodes of the hit television shows, House M.D., Bones, Shameless, and the Gareth Emery produced web series "We are CVNT5" created by Garreth Emery. Locke stars as “Bill” in the vertical series VIC. He has appeared in international campaigns for Coca-Cola, Pepsi, Bacardi, Subaru, Contiki, Mercedes Benz, GAP and others. Locke has cameo roles in the horror film Excess Flesh, as well as co-starring role in the hit series Jane The Virgin and a cameo in the Hallie Meyers-Shyer film Home Again, starring Reese Witherspoon. He makes a cameo appearance as "Perry" the Icy Receptionist in his sister's beloved Netflix series From Scratch. Locke has also appeared in music videos by Walk The Moon, Adam Lambert, Halsey and Taylor Swift.

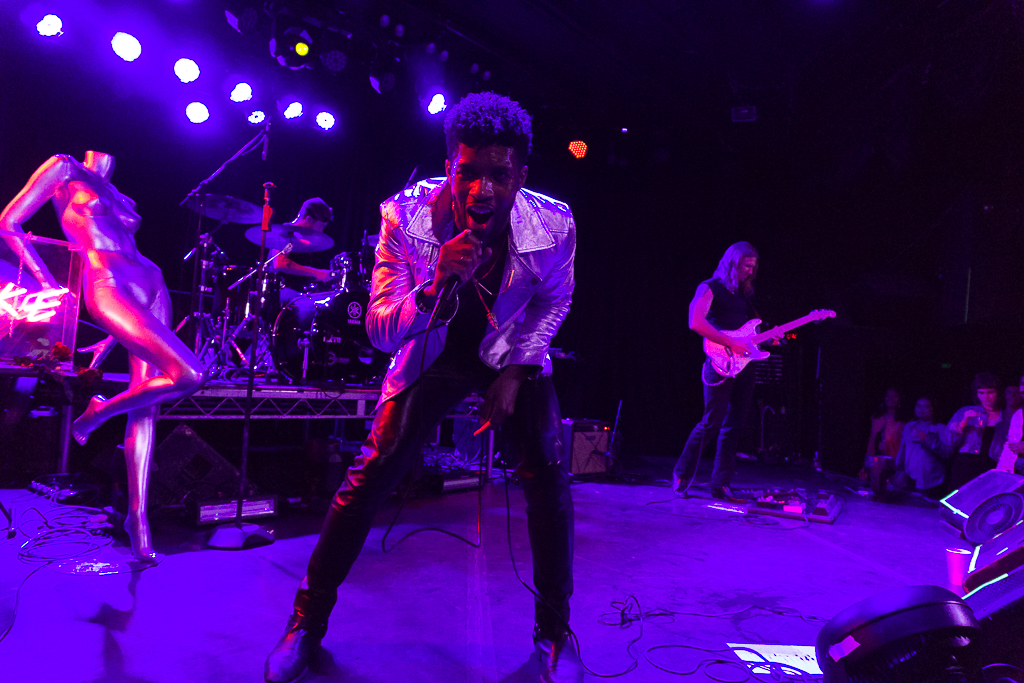
Doug Locke performing live at The Roxy in Los Angeles, CA.

== Blue Heart ==
In 2015, Locke released his debut EP “Blue Heart” featuring #ThisCouldBeUs as the lead single. His musical influences include Prince, Jimi Hendrix, Lenny Kravitz, Rihanna, Beyoncé and Madonna. His work has been featured in The Huffington Post, Out Magazine, Idolator, GLAAD, AFROPUNK, Logo's NewNowNext, Upworthy.com, PopMatters.com, Blurred Culture and many others.

“Blue Heart” sports a collection of Electric Pop, Funk Rock, and R&B Soul inspired songs tackling themes of love, sex and empowerment written by Locke and Producer Eric McNeely.

The single “#ThisCouldBeUs” hit no.32 on the iTunes Hot 100 chart (Barbados) and the music video went viral and has more than 1.3 million views to date. The video was embraced by the LGBT community for its touching portrayal of unrequited love, and was featured in the 2015 Massimadi Festival in Montreal. The music video for “KING” (the second single from the “Blue Heart” EP) was released on May 4, 2015, to coincide with National Anti-Bullying Day and premiered on Idolator.com. His third single "Rendezvous" featuring Kaleena Zanders premiered on January 24, 2016, on the popular site, Afropunk.

In addition to playing shows all over Los Angeles (including The Hotel Café and Club Moscow), Locke recently headlined Portland Pride. In November 2017, Locke opened for Gavin Turek as support for her "Good Look For You" tour stop at The Roxy in Los Angeles. He has appeared on kCal/CBS Morning Show in Los Angeles and Great Day Houston.

His concert film, Locke: Live at Club Moscow, premiered in Los Angeles at El Cid on February 22, 2016, and can be seen on YouTube. On October 26, 2018, Locke released the song "In or Out." The music video has a vampire theme inspired by the 1980s horror cult classic film, The Lost Boys, and premiered with Out magazine. The video was nominated in the "Best Indie Music Video" category of the 2018 Queerty Awards (The Queerties).

== Black Travolta ==
Locke released his Black Travolta EP on May 8, 2020. This is the first in a series of three EPs known collectively as the Lunar Series. "Black Travolta" includes country, disco, pop and hip hop influences. According to American Songwriter magazine, "For his new single “Black Travolta” however, Los Angeles-based artist Doug Locke didn’t merely sew a recognizable hook into an original song... he wove a total banger. Needling that iconic and unmistakable melodic funk riff from The Bee Gees’ disco hit “Stayin’ Alive” into an ecstasy-fueled Ennio Morricone soundtrack, “Black Travolta” turns up the disco bassline in this Spaghetti Western theme song to Full Throb.". The second EP in the series, Why? (Lunar II), was released on June 26, 2020. The music video for "Why?" premiered on September 24, 2020, with Substream Magazine and was featured by Billboard, and Stitched Sound.

Locke has headlined sold out shows at the Viper Room on Los Angeles' Sunset Strip on November 19, 2022. and gave a legendary performance at WeHo Pride on June 4, 2023

== Phoenix ==
On June 23, 2023, Locke released his second studio album, Phoenix. The album marked a stylistic evolution, incorporating elements of pop, alternative R&B, disco, country and rock while exploring themes of resilience, transformation, identity and self acceptance.

A review from Queerty states:

The album showcases Locke's evolution and growth over a three-year period, symbolized by the title itself, representing hope, rebirth, and transformation, seamlessly blending 80s-inspired dance-pop with guitar-driven elements, all while incorporating disco and house influences for a modern twist. It's got a little bit of everything, while Locke continues to GIVE everything in his live performances, most recently at Weho Pride. Locke's deep and sultry vocals add a unique touch to tracks like "Black Travolta", and his talent and charisma shine throughout Phoenix serving as a must-listen album that effortlessly combines various genres into a cohesive and refreshing musical experience.

In support of the album, Locke headlined a sold-out album release show at the Viper Room. Locke was interviewed by Snubb3d Magazine as a part of "The Sit Down" series, and was profiled by Outfront Magazine.

Following the album’s release, Locke headlined a sold-out show at the Troubadour in Los Angeles, one of the city’s best-known live music venues. A reviewer from We Found New Music states,

"When Doug Locke graced the stage, it was as if a beat dropped. Effortless taste and captivating swag rolled off of Doug with musicality. Everything from the attitude on his face to the spirit in his gait spelled purpose. With backup dancers in sync (Emily Chamberlain, Marlon Pelayo), he sang ‘#ThisCouldBeUs,’ while a guitarist in leopard print (Dakota Compain) shredded alongside him. Doug embodies many different eras – disco, rock, pop – and his voice penetrates a room like you’ve heard it before and need to hear it again. Complete with costume changes, sultry solos by Marlon and Emily, and Doug jumping into the crowd, they held nothing back for a full, fiery 50 minutes."

He has also performed on the mainstage at OUTLOUD Music Festival during WeHo Pride.

== Doug Locke’s Rock N’ Roll Cabaret ==
In 2024, Locke launched Doug Locke’s Rock N’ Roll Cabaret, a recurring live music and variety show in West Hollywood. Created and produced by Locke, the event combines live musical performances with burlesque, dancers and guest performers, with each installment centered around a different theme.

The series debuted at Hotel Ziggy before expanding to a residency at The West Hollywood EDITION. The event has featured a variety of local musicians, performers, and special guests, becoming an ongoing part of Locke’s creative work outside of his recording career.

== Discography ==
=== Studio Albums ===
- Blue Heart (EP) (2015)
- Phoenix (2023)

=== Live Albums ===
- Live at The Troubadour

=== Extended Plays ===
- Black Travolta - Lunar I (EP) (2020)
- Why? - Lunar II (EP) 2020

=== Singles ===
- In or Out (Single) (2018)
- Lady Macbeth (Single) (2023)
