= 1991 Stinkers Bad Movie Awards =

Film awards ceremony

The 14th Stinkers Bad Movie Awards were released by the Hastings Bad Cinema Society in 1992 to honour the worst films the film industry had to offer in 1991. Founders Mike Lancaster and Ray Wright listed Nothing but Trouble among their personal picks for the five worst movies of the 1990s.

As follows, there was only a Worst Picture category with excerpts of provided commentary for each nominee, as well as a list of films that were also considered for the final list but ultimately failed to make the cut (24 total).

== Worst Picture Ballot ==
Film	Production company(s)
Nothing but Trouble	Warner Bros.
Cool As Ice	Universal Pictures
Harley Davidson and the Marlboro Man	MGM, United Artists
Hudson Hawk	TriStar
Shakes the Clown	IRS Media

=== Dishonourable Mentions ===
- All I Want for Christmas (Paramount)
- Another You (TriStar)
- Career Opportunities (Universal)
- Curly Sue (Warner Bros.)
- The Dark Backward (Greycat Films)
- Dice Rules (New Line)
- Dollman (Paramount)
- Drop Dead Fred (New Line)
- Ernest Scared Stupid (Touchstone)
- Ghoulies 3: Ghoulies Go to College (Lightning)
- Hook (TriStar)
- A Kiss Before Dying (Universal)
- Mannequin Two: On the Move (Fox)
- The Marrying Man (Hollywood)
- The NeverEnding Story II: The Next Chapter (Warner Bros.)
- Oscar (Touchstone)
- Problem Child 2 (Universal)
- Return to the Blue Lagoon (Columbia)
- Robin Hood: Prince of Thieves (Warner Bros.)
- Rock-A-Doodle (Samuel Goldwyn)
- Stepping Out (Paramount)
- Stone Cold (Columbia)
- The Super (Fox)
- Teenage Mutant Ninja Turtles II: The Secret of the Ooze (New Line)
