= Excess Flesh =

- Directed by: Patrick Kennelly
- Written by: Sigrid Gilmer; Patrick Kennelly
- Produced by: Dennis Garcia; Leo Garcia
- Starring: Bethany Orr; Mary Loveless
- Cinematography: Benjamin Conley
- Edited by: Cristina Bercovitz; Patrick Kennelly
- Music by: Jonathan Snipes
- Release date: March 13, 2015 (SXSW)
- Running time: 103 minutes
- Country: United States
- Language: English

Excess Flesh is a 2015 American horror film directed by Patrick Kennelly, written by Sigrid Gilmer and Kennelly, and starring Bethany Orr and Mary Loveless. Orr and Loveless play the new roommates who share an obsession with food.

== Plot ==
Jealous of her very thin supermodel roommate Jennifer, the midsized Jill binges and purges in an attempt to maintain her weight. Their relationship becomes even more strained as Jennifer mocks Jill's issues. Overcome with hatred, Jill lashes out at her roommate and chains Jennifer to the wall, where she taunts her with food. As Jill falls further into madness, her hygiene suffers, as does the cleanliness of the apartment. None of this seems to concern the women's neighbors and the love interest of the movie as they come to try to check on the women, and Jennifer continues to insult Jill even while restrained.

Jennifer manages to escape at one point and Jill manages to catch up to her on the street just as police officers in passing notice the girls' state of near undress. Despite having officers there, Jennifer says nothing. Jill attributes Jennifer's catatonic state to insomnia and stress and manages to get Jennifer back to the apartment. Jill bathes Jennifer, telling her how she was worried and scared about her. Jennifer finally tries to call for help and Jill strangles her into unconsciousness. Pushed to the edge by Jennifer's continual abuse, Jill finally stabs her to death and envisions taking her place on the modeling stage; however, Jill is seen still alone in the dirty apartment, implying that Jennifer only existed in Jill's mind.

== Cast ==
- Bethany Orr as Jill
- Mary Loveless as Jennifer
- Wes McGee as Rob
- Sheresade Poblet as Cathy
- Jill Jacobson as Beverly
- Dana L. Wilson as Becky
- Kristin Minter as Nina
- Robert Maffia as Officer Jimmy
- Jules Bruff as Office Marie
- Juan Riedinger as Sebastian
- Doug Locke as Terence
- Saif Xnaydra as Young Hollywood
- Allen Rueckert as Trevor

== Production ==
Kennelly came up with the idea for the film ten years prior its release after reading about eating disorders and how they can physicalize mental issues. The isolation of living in Los Angeles was another inspiration, and Kennelly said that the situations in the story came from his and co-writer Gilmer's experiences. Kennelly wanted to create a horror film using the tropes of romantic comedies and sitcoms, genres that he said he found scary. Kennelly enjoys films that confront and challenge audiences, and he wanted this film to do the same. Kennelly had gone to school with Loveless and believed that she would be good for the role of Jennifer. Orr was cast after auditioning. The film was shot mostly in sequence. Orr and Loveless said that this contributed to developing a better understanding of their characters. There was also a practical reason: the apartment had to be progressively destroyed throughout the story. Due to the trashed set and food that was required to be left out, the crew wore masks. Orr said that she found her character to be an unlikely hero despite her being "brutally flawed". Shooting lasted for three weeks, and many scenes were done in four or less takes. Orr said that she spent so much time getting into character that it was difficult for her when shooting ended. Kennelly said of the film, "Excess Flesh is a visualization of what goes on inside a woman's head. It's about the nightmare of the self in the modern world."

The film's score was composed and produced by Jonathan Snipes, best known as a member of noise-rap group clipping.

== Release ==
Excess Flesh premiered at South by Southwest on March 13, 2015. Midnight Releasing will release the film on DVD and video on demand on March 8, 2016.

== Reception ==
Marc Savlov of The Austin Chronicle compared it to Nick Zedd's Cinema of Transgression and said that it is "nauseating, perceptive, and an altogether damning indictment of a hyper-consumerist society run amuck". Writing in The Daily Beast, Marlow Stern called it "the most twisted movie at SXSW—and of the year, so far". Susanna Jackson of WBUR-FM wrote that it is "handled both thoughtfully and perhaps over gratuitously". Shock Till You Drop's Samuel Zimmerman wrote, "This is a film as informed by the veneer of Los Angeles as it is sickened by it; a layer cake of aggression, shame and madness. It's pretty exhilarating." Heather Wixson of Daily Dead rated it 2/5 stars and wrote that the film is not as clever or insightful as it seems to think it is.
