= Cool as Ice =

1991 film by David Kellogg

- Theatrical release poster
- Directed by: David Kellogg
- Written by: David Stenn
- Produced by: Carolyn Pfeiffer; Lionel Wigram
- Starring: Vanilla Ice; Kristin Minter; Michael Gross
- Cinematography: Janusz Kamiński
- Edited by: Debra Goldfield
- Music by: Stanley Clarke
- Distributed by: Universal Pictures
- Release date: October 18, 1991
- Running time: 91 minutes
- Country: United States
- Language: English
- Budget: $6 million
- Box office: $1.2 million

Cool as Ice is a 1991 American musical teen drama film, directed by David Kellogg, written by David Stenn and starring rapper Vanilla Ice in his feature film debut. The plot focuses on Johnny Van Owen, a freewheeling, motorcycle-riding rapper who arrives in a small town and meets Kathy Winslow, an honor student who catches his eye. Meanwhile, Kathy's father Gordon, who is in witness protection, is found by Clarke and Morrisey, the corrupt police officers he escaped from years ago.

Developed as a vehicle for Vanilla Ice, the film was widely panned by critics, and was a box office bomb, grossing only $1.2 million from a $6 million budget.

== Plot ==
Johnny Van Owen is a rapper who drifts from city to city. Johnny is performing at a nightclub, rapping and dancing with his crew and a club background singer playing "Cool as Ice (Everybody Get Loose)". While the group passes through a small town, Johnny falls for honor student Kathy Winslow. The crew is stranded in the town after Jazz's motorcycle breaks down and has to be left at a local repair shop. While waiting for repairs, Johnny uses the opportunity to see Kathy. She already has a boyfriend named Nick, whom he advises Kathy to dump.

Johnny shows up with his crew at a local club frequented by Kathy and her friends. Noticing that no one was enjoying the live music playing at the club, Johnny and the crew decide to perform a musical number, "People's Choice", by unplugging the other band's instruments and taking control, shocking the audience and ending with Johnny sweeping Kathy off her feet, humiliating Nick.

Nick offers to forgive Kathy and take her home, but she refuses and walks home by herself. Unbeknownst to Kathy, she is stalked by Clarke and Morrisey, two strange men in a car. She is saved by Johnny, who takes her home. At the club's parking lot, a jealous Nick and his friends smash up motorcycles belonging to Johnny's friends. Nick's friends attack Johnny who fights back, leaving Nick and his buddies unconscious and Nick himself in the hospital with a broken nose.

Kathy's father, Gordon, becomes suspicious of Johnny, and warns Kathy to stay away from him because they can't trust strangers. The next day, Kathy goes for a ride with Johnny against Gordon's wishes. They ride all over town, including a construction site. When they finally return home, they are greeted by an angry Gordon, who coldly warns Johnny to stay away from Kathy.

Gordon, under pressure from his wife Grace, reveals to Kathy the secret of his past—he was once a police officer. They were on the run from the corrupt Clarke and Morrisey and were able to escape using fabricated documents, explaining why he kept his life a secret from Kathy all these years. Kathy criticizes Gordon, saying it was not fair that he lied to her in order to protect her, yet refuses to permit her to see a total stranger.

The next day, Johnny agrees to give Tommy, Kathy's younger brother, a ride on his bike. They cruise through the streets, and finally back to the Winslow home, where Tommy is later kidnapped. At the repair shop, the crew prepares to leave town since the bike has been repaired, but they tell Johnny to say goodbye to Kathy. When Johnny arrives at the Winslow house, he finds an envelope meant for the family. It turns out to be a message from Clarke and Morrisey with Tommy recording it. Fearing the worst, Gordon accuses Johnny of criminal involvement, much to Kathy's dismay.

When Kathy asks Johnny to play the tape left behind by Clarke and Morrisey, he hears a loud clanging noise from a construction vehicle, revealing the message was recorded at the construction site. The gang ambushes Clarke and Morrisey and rescues Tommy. When the police arrive, the gang return Tommy to the Winslows and Gordon apologizes to Johnny. Johnny tells Kathy he has to move on, but she decides to follow him. Nick arrives in his car, telling Kathy to get used to being a biker chick because she will never see him again. Kathy holds on as Johnny uses the car as a ramp and the two new lovers ride off into the big city. The film ends with Johnny reaching his destination, rapping "Get Wit It" and dancing with his crew to an audience at a nightclub. Kathy joins him on stage after the show is over, dancing alone in the spotlight.

== Cast ==
- Vanilla Ice as John "Johnny" Van Owen
- Kristin Minter as Kathy Winslow
- Michael Gross as Gordon Winslow/Hackett James Anthony Hackett. Jimmy
- Deezer D as Jazz
- John Haymes Newton as Nick
- Candy Clark as Grace Winslow
- Victor DiMattia as Tommy Winslow
- Naomi Campbell as Singer
- Kathryn Morris as Jen
- Jack McGee as Clarke
- S.A. Griffin as Morrisey
- Sydney Lassick as Roscoe
- Dody Goodman as Mae
- Bobbie Brown as Monique
- Allison Dean as Princess

== Production ==
Initial development for the film began after record executives at SBK learned about Ice Cube's involvement in Boyz n the Hood and wanted to create a film project for Vanilla Ice to capitalize on the success of his debut album To the Extreme. Filming began in April 1991. The role of Kathy Winslow was offered to Gwyneth Paltrow but her father Bruce Paltrow advised against accepting it, as he felt the film could hurt her career.

== Music ==
The film's soundtrack album contained four new songs by Vanilla Ice, as well as other material. It peaked at No. 89 on the Billboard 200.

== Reception ==
The film opened in 393 theaters in the United States, grossing $638,000, and ranking at No. 14 among the week's new releases. Reviewers widely panned the film. On review aggregator Rotten Tomatoes, the film holds a score of 3% based on reviews from 33 critics, with an average rating of 2.9/10. On Metacritic, the film holds a weighted average score of 24 out of 100 based on 10 critics, indicating "generally unfavorable" reviews. Blender ranked Vanilla Ice's performance in the film as the seventh-worst performance by a musician turned actor. Director David Kellogg later disowned the film.

== Awards ==
Award	Date of ceremony	Category	Subject	Result
Golden Raspberry Awards	March 29, 1992	Worst Picture	Carolyn Pfeiffer & Lionel Wigram	Nominated
Golden Raspberry Awards	March 29, 1992	Worst Director	David Kellogg	Nominated
Golden Raspberry Awards	March 29, 1992	Worst Screenplay	David Stenn	Nominated
Golden Raspberry Awards	March 29, 1992	Worst New Star	Kristin Minter	Nominated
Golden Raspberry Awards	March 29, 1992	Worst New Star	Vanilla Ice	Won
Golden Raspberry Awards	March 29, 1992	Worst Actor	Vanilla Ice	Nominated
Golden Raspberry Awards	March 29, 1992	Worst Original Song	"Cool as Ice (Everybody Get Loose)" by Vanilla Ice, Gail King & Princessa	Nominated
Stinkers Bad Movie Awards	1992	Worst Picture	Carolyn Pfeiffer & Lionel Wigram	Nominated
