= Mind Blowin' =

1994 studio album by Vanilla Ice

Studio album by Vanilla Ice
- Released: March 22, 1994
- Recorded: 1992–94
- Studio: Luminous Sound Studios (Dallas, Texas)
- Genre: Gangsta rap
- Length: 47:14
- Label: SBK
- Producers: Tha Hit-Men; Vanilla Ice

Vanilla Ice chronology
Cool as Ice (1991)	Mind Blowin' (1994)	Back 2 Back Hits (1998)

Singles from Mind Blowin'
- 1. "Roll 'Em Up" Released: February 9, 1994; 2. "The Wrath" Released: August 17, 1994; 3. "Get Loose" Released: March 27, 1995

Mind Blowin' is the second studio album by the American rapper Vanilla Ice. Released on March 22, 1994, it is the rapper's final release on SBK Records. The album did not chart and received unfavorable reviews. Songs from the album made up one third of Vanilla Ice's tours during 1992–2010.

The album shifted just 42,000 copies in the United States, a massive drop in comparison to his blockbuster debut album To the Extreme. Despite this, lead single "Roll 'Em Up" received some airplay in Europe.

== Lyrics ==
Cyco of Insane Poetry worked on 10 songs on the album.

"The Wrath", one of the album's singles, was a reply to the single "Pop Goes the Weasel" by 3rd Bass.

Mark Wahlberg, then in the rap group Marky Mark and the Funky Bunch, had made negative remarks about Ice in one of his songs. Ice answered back in the song "Hit 'Em Hard" which was mostly a diss track aimed at Mark, but Ice also included 3rd Bass and MC Hammer. Neither 3rd Bass nor Marky Mark and the Funky Bunch responded.

A lot of the lyrics were drug influenced and featured references to smoking marijuana, especially in the single Roll 'em Up. The song I Go Down pays tribute to Gang Starr, Mary J. Blige and Tupac Shakur.

== Reception ==
Professional ratings
Review scores
Source	Rating
AllMusic	2/5 stars
Entertainment Weekly	D
Los Angeles Times	1.5/4 stars
NME	5/10
The Rolling Stone Album Guide	1/5 stars
Select	1/5 medals

Reviews were unfavorable. Entertainment Weekly reviewer James Bernard called the album "more clunky than funky". Rolling Stone reviewer Danyel Smith called the song "Get Loose" "snappy", writing that although the lyrics are "inane", "the song is a thumping party, one of the few places where Ice loosens up. He sounds solid at the beginning of 'The Wrath' as well [...] He sounds easy and unaffected – close to sexy. But he doesn't keep it up: In 'Now and Forever,' a wet dream kind of song, Ice goes back to goofy lyrics [...] and his dry Max Headroom style." AllMusic reviewer Stephen Thomas Erlewine wrote that "There isn't a single moment that establishes a distinct musical identity, and the whole thing is rather embarrassing."

The album was named the "Least Essential Album Showcasing An Image Makeover" in The A.V. Club's list of the "Least Essential Albums of the '90s," cited as "an album that inspired almost no one to roll up the hootie mack, as instructed in its first single."

== Track listing ==
All tracks are written by Vanilla Ice and Zero unless otherwise noted. All songs produced by DJ Zero and Vanilla Ice unless otherwise noted.

No.	Title	Writer(s)	Producer(s)	Length
1.	"Live Intro"		DJ Zero, Tha Hit Men and Vanilla Ice	0:51
2.	"Fame"		DJ Zero, Tha Hit Men and Vanilla Ice	4:15
3.	"Get 'Em Now"			0:08
4.	"The Wrath"			4:20
5.	"Roll 'Em Up"	Vanilla Ice, Rod Johnson and Patrick Rollins		4:30
6.	"Hit 'Em Hard"			3:10
7.	"Smooth Interlude"			0:31
8.	"Now And Forever"			3:40
9.	"Iceman Party"	Vanilla Ice	Tha Hit Men and Vanilla Ice	3:34
10.	"Oh My Gosh"			3:25
11.	"Minutes Of Power"	Vanilla Ice	Tha Hit Men and Vanilla Ice	3:50
12.	"I Go Down"			3:27
13.	"Bullet On The Chart"			0:28
14.	"Phunky Rhymes"			3:47
15.	"Blowin' My Mind"			3:18
16.	"Son Of A Gun"			0:07
17.	"Get Loose"			3:41
Total length:				47:14

== Samples ==
Fame

- "Long Red" by Mountain
- "Synthetic Substitution" by Melvin Bliss
- "Voodoo Child (Slight Return)" by Jimi Hendrix
- "Fame" by David Bowie

The Wrath

- "Wicked World" by Black Sabbath
- "When Boys Talk" by Indeep

Roll 'Em Up

- "It's a New Day" by Skull Snaps
- "Insane In The Brain" by Cypress Hill

Hit Em Hard

- "Impeach the President" by The Honey Drippers

Smooth Interlude

- "Do It Roger" by Roger

Now & Forever

- "Don't Change Your Love" by Five Stairsteps
- "Motor Booty Affair" by Parliament
- "Do It Roger" by Roger

Iceman Party

- "Do You Wanna Go Party" by KC & the Sunshine Band
- "I Heard It Through the Grapevine" by Roger

Oh My Gosh

- "Say It Loud, I'm Black and I'm Proud" by James Brown
- "It's a New Day" by Skull Snaps

Minutes of Power

- "Cold Sweat" by James Brown
- "Take Me to the Next Phase" by The Isley Brothers
- "Opening/Can You Feel It" by The Jacksons
- "Cutie Pie" by One Way

I Go Down

- "Impeach the President" by The Honey Drippers
- "You're Just What I Need" by Betty Wright

Phunky Rhymes

- "Doo Wa Ditty (Blow That Thing)" by Zapp
- "Son of Reach for It (The Funky Dream)" by George Duke

Blowin My Mind

- "Sara Smile" by Hall & Oates
- "Mind Blowing Decisions" by Heatwave

Son of a Gun

- "Breakdowns of 1939" by Warner Bros.

Get Loose

- "More Bounce to the Ounce" by Zapp
- "We Call It the Box" by Bill Summers

== Personnel ==
=== Musicians ===
- Vanilla Ice — vocals, producer, engineer, executive producer, mixing
- Darryl "Delite" Allamby — keyboards
- Davis Bickston — drums
- Mike Daane — bass
- Dee Dee Harris — vocals
- Paul Loomis — keyboards
- Jeffrey Smith — electronic sounds, talk box
- Andy Timmons — guitar
- Robert Wechsler — guitar, programming, engineer, synclavier
- Steve Williams — drums

=== Additional personnel ===
- Scott Burnworth — art direction, design, photography
- Tom Coyne — mastering
- Dave Gossett — A&R
- Glen Hardy — photography
- Sean Hargraves — type
- Phil Johnson — art direction, design
- Scott Johnson — art direction, design
- James Conrad Koch — logo
- Tha Hit Men — producer
- Zero — producer, mixing
