= Cool as Ice (Everybody Get Loose) =

Single by Vanilla Ice featuring Naomi Campbell

from the album Cool as Ice (Original Motion Picture Soundtrack)
- Released: September 24, 1991
- Recorded: 1991
- Length: 3:43 (radio edit); 4:00 (alternate radio version); 5:33 (album version)
- Label: SBK
- Songwriters: Robert Matthew Van Winkle; Gail "Sky" King; Princessa
- Producer: Gail "Sky" King

Vanilla Ice singles chronology
"Ninja Rap" (1991)	"Cool as Ice (Everybody Get Loose)" (1991)	"Roll 'Em Up" (1994)

Naomi Campbell singles chronology
"Cool as Ice (Everybody Get Loose)" (1991)	"Love and Tears" (1994)

"Cool as Ice (Everybody Get Loose)" is a song written by Vanilla Ice, Gail "Sky" King and Jennece "Princessa" Moore, and performed by American rapper Vanilla Ice featuring vocals from English model Naomi Campbell. Produced by King, it was released on September 24, 1991, via SBK Records as a single from the soundtrack to David Kellogg's film Cool as Ice. The single peaked at number 81 on the Billboard Hot 100.

== Track listing ==
Promo CD maxi – U.S.

1. "Cool as Ice (Everybody Get Loose)" (radio edit) (featuring Naomi Campbell) – 3:43
2. "Cool as Ice (Everybody Get Loose)" (alternate radio version) (featuring Dian Sorel) – 4:00
3. "Cool as Ice (Everybody Get Loose)" (featuring Naomi Campbell) – 5:33
4. "Cool as Ice (Naomi Gets Loose)" (featuring Naomi Campbell) – 5:33
5. "Cool as Ice (Everybody Get Loose)" (instrumental) (featuring Naomi Campbell) – 5:31

== Charts ==
Chart (1991)	Peak position
Australia (ARIA)	171
US Billboard Hot 100	81
