= Kristin Minter =

American actress

- Occupation: Actress
- Years active: 1989–present
- Known for: Home Alone

Kristin Minter is an American actress. She is best known as Heather McCallister in Home Alone (1990), Miranda "Randi" Fronczak in ER (1995–2003) and Kathy Winslow in Cool as Ice (1991).

== Career ==
In 1990, Kristin Minter played Heather McCallister, the oldest cousin of main character Kevin McCallister (Macaulay Culkin), in Home Alone. The movie made nearly $500 million worldwide. Minter was one of only three main cast members not to return in the sequel, Home Alone 2: Lost in New York, two years later.

In 1991, Minter portrayed Kathy Winslow in the film Cool as Ice alongside Vanilla Ice. For her performance in Cool as Ice, she received a nomination for the Razzie Award for Worst New Star at the 12th Golden Raspberry Awards.

Minter played Rachel MacLeod in three season four episodes of Highlander: The Series: "Homeland", "Deliverance", and "Promises". She has played minor roles in numerous television series, most notably on ER as Miranda "Randi" Fronczak for 71 episodes from 1995 to 2003. Minter also portrayed Nina in the 2015 body horror film Excess Flesh.

== Filmography ==
=== Film ===
Year	Title	Role	Notes
1990	Home Alone	Heather McCallister	
1991	Cool as Ice	Kathy Winslow	
1992	Passed Away	Karen	
1992	Bayscape 2042	Agent Man	Short film
1994	There Goes My Baby	Tracy	
1994	Flashfire	Lisa Cates	
1995	Lover's Knot	Cheryl	
1996	Savage	Marie Belot	
1997	The Temple of Phenomenal Things	Monica	
1998	The Effects of Magic	Zebrah	
1999	Live Virgin	Susie	
1999	Tyrone	Stella	
2000	The Apostate	Charlotte	
2000	Tick Tock	Carla	
2000	Diamond Men	Cherry	
2000	King of the Open Mics	Gina	
2000	Behind the Seams	Joy	
2001	A Wedding for Bella	Lucca	
2001	Myopia	Claire	
2002	Waiting for Anna	Anna	Short film
2002	March 1st	Stephanie	Short film
2002	The Gray in Between	Suzie	
2003	Straighten Up America	Helen	Short film
2005	In the Blink of an Eye	Reina	
2008	Six Sex Scenes and a Murder	Regan Price	
2009	Dead in Love	Sara	
2010	What If...	Cynthia	
2011	Blur	Candace	
2013	Eat Spirit Eat	Miss Parysian	
2015	Excess Flesh	Nina	
2015	Fire City: End of Days	Jane	
2015	7th Secret	Liz Lombardi	
2015	Honeyglue	Aunt Lisa	
2016	Dirty	Captain Scott	
2017	Liza, Liza, Skies Are Grey	Mother	
2018	The Clash of Ms. Ampersand Dottington's Dubious DNA	Kitty Patterson	Short Film
2022	7th Secret	Liz	

=== Television ===
Year	Title	Role	Notes
1989	Living Dolls	Jenna	Episode: "The Flash Is Always Greener"
1990	The Outsiders	Sheila	5 episodes
1993	Moon Over Miami	Rebecca	Episode: "Pilot"
1994	Family Album	Valerie Thayer	Miniseries
1995	University Hospital	Debra Vaughn	2 episodes
1995	Pig Sty	Christine	2 episodes
1995	Fallen Angels	Sue Hambleton	Episode: "Fly Paper"
1995	Dad, the Angel & Me	Rita	Television film
1995–1996	Highlander: The Series	Rachel MacLeod	3 episodes
1995–2003	ER	Miranda "Randi" Fronczak	71 episodes
1996	Kung Fu: The Legend Continues	Emma	Episode: "Black Widow"
1998	Brimstone	Janice Nowack	Episode: "Encore"
2000	G vs E	Annalise	8 episodes
2001	Providence	Alex	Episode: "Trial & Error"
2001	NYPD Blue	Candy	Episode: "Two Clarks in a Bar"
2003	John Doe	Charlotte Williams	Episode: "Tone Dead"
2004	General Hospital	Jordan Baines	Episode: "1.10661"
2005	Blind Justice	Cheryl Vitti	Episode: "Marlon's Brando"
2005	Crossing Jordan	Sara	Episode: "Enlightenment"
2006	Pepper Dennis	Bambi	Episode: "Dennis, Bulgari, Big Losers at ACoRNS"
2006	CSI: Crime Scene Investigation	Hooker	Episode: "Living Legend"
2007	Dirt	Dana Pritchard	Episode: "The Thing Under the Bed"
2009	Nip/Tuck	Kitty	Episode: "Gene Shelly"
2010	The Mentalist	Sugar	Episode: "Red Sky at Night"
2013	Ironside	Ivana	2 episodes
2013	Ray Donovan	Liza Hendricks	2 episodes
2017	The Look-Book	Kiersten	Episode: "Model Citizens"
2017	This Is Us	Miss Dobson	Episode" "Déjà Vu"
2020	Hightown	Gina	2 episodes

=== Video games ===
Year	Title	Role	Notes
2004	Halo 2	Sophia Bossedon	
