= Gail King =

Gail Sky King
- Born: January 14, 1956; Queens, New York, U.S.
- Died: May 16, 2022; New York, New York, U.S.
- Occupations: DJ; music producer; staff composer; writer; skating stunt coordinator
- Spouse: Maris Ambats (married 1989)

Gail Sky King (January 14, 1956 – May 16, 2022), also known as Sky King, was an American musician and composer. She was best known for her work on various children's shows, including Sesame Street as a staff composer, and Ghostwriter as a musical director and composer. She is also known for her work in the music industry, including her work on Vanilla Ice's track "Cool as Ice (Everybody Get Loose)" as a writer and producer. She was also known for her involvement in juggling clubs, including the International Jugglers' Association, and was typically involved in their workshops and events. King died on May 16, 2022.

== Early life ==
King was born Queens, New York on January 14, 1956 to immigrant parents from Barbados. King first learned to play guitar at a sleep-away camp when she was twelve years old, and in her teenage years she played as a guitarist for various funk and jazz bands. She later got started in disc jockeying as a radio jock at Emerson College in Boston, Massachusetts while earning her communications degree, playing until 1974.

== Career ==
After leaving Emerson, King joined a roller skating group called "The Wizards", in which she professionally skated in various rinks around the United States, Canada, Europe, and South America.

During the 1970s, King worked as a DJ in various New York City establishments, including roller-discos and nightclubs. In 1980, King worked as a DJ in The Roxy.

Around 1983, King began to branch out from being a DJ and began working as an engineering assistant for Arthur Baker, but later transitioned towards production, getting involved with editing and creating remixes of existing songs, in which "[King would] keep only the original vocals and create all new tracks underneath." Between 1984 and 1988, King jockeyed at The Red Parrot, a nightclub which was located in Midtown Manhattan, in which she would keep up with her remix works and "break" it to crowds. She notably served as one of the first black DJs for a "prime-time" audience, and frequently was featured on the club's advertising material. While doing DJ work at night, King also worked at WPIX as an audio-production engineer.

King worked as a skating stunt coordinator in The Muppets Take Manhattan, working with Gregory Hines. Hines recommended King to work as a musical director and composer for Ghostwriter.

King was later hired to work on Sesame Street as a staff composer, being brought on by Kevin Clash while he was searching for talent to support a new character for the show. Starting in the Fall of 1993 King worked with Sesame street for over 12 seasons, there was talk about having her own character but it never aired.

== Discrimination ==
While working in studios, King faced discrimination for her gender. King has recounted when she was unjustifiably paid less than a male coworker during her DJ career:

Being a woman has both hindered and helped my career. I've had some negative experiences. Once I discovered that a male DJ was paid more than I was even though I spun the more successful weekends. When I confronted the owner he said simply that " a man needs more money." He couldn't see the inequity in this and I ultimately split.

== Personal life ==
=== Juggling ===
King was a well known juggler: she was involved in the International Jugglers' Association (IJA) and was a part of the Carmine Street Irregulars, a New York-based juggling club named by King herself. King first became involved with juggling after purchasing Juggling for the Complete Klutz from a Barnes & Noble. She continued to practice with coworkers on Sesame Street, which later led her to attend meetings for the Carmine Street Irregulars, a local New York City jugglers club located at the Carmine Street Recreation Center. The club was populated by new jugglers and national champions alike. Gail herself was drawn to the club due to the diverse skill levels found at the club:

"There are some serious cats here who are world champions, and there are beginners who nevertheless practice it with the same degree of determination. When I tell people people I'm in the club, they laugh and say, 'Oh, you want to be a clown?' But they don't understand the level that these people have taken juggling to -- it's truly an art form."

Within the IJA, King was very active in the community, often found DJing for events, "teaching workshops, and leading huge groups of jugglers in games of Sky Says."

She was then introduced her to Ray Smith, the third and only other Black juggler at the convention.

“I jokingly said, ‘This is the inaugural meeting of the BJA — Black Jugglers Association’ — and they both fell out laughing. But of course, it wasn't really funny because it was a shame — one thousand people and there are three Black folks.” says Sky. “That didn't deter me or put me out, but it would have been nice to see more people of color represented.”

In 2021, the IJA established the "Sky King Award", given "[in] recognition of outstanding dedication to furthering diversity and equity in the juggling community by a BIPOC member of that community."

King married Latvian-born robotics engineer Maris Ambats in June, 1989. Their daughter, Krista Ambats, was born in December, 1989. On May 16, 2022, King died at Mt. Sinai Hospital.

== Discography ==
King was involved as a writer for the Vanilla Ice album Cool as Ice, including its title track Cool as Ice (Everybody Get Loose).

King was a composer on Sesame Street: 123 Count with me in 1997.
