= David Martin (singer) =

- Also known as: David Lee Martin; Seth Martin
- Born: Hammersmith, England
- Genres: Pop, soft rock
- Occupations: Singer-songwriter, producer
- Instrument: Vocals
- Years active: 1962–present
- Formerly of: Arnold, Martin and Morrow; Butterscotch; James Last Orchestra

David Martin is a British singer-songwriter and record producer. He was one third of the songwriting collective Arnold, Martin and Morrow with Chris Arnold and Geoff Morrow. In 1970, the trio had a hit with "Don't You Know (She Said Hello)" under the name Butterscotch. Martin co-wrote and recorded the original version of "Can't Smile Without You" which was later covered by and made a hit for Barry Manilow.

== Early life ==
Martin was born in Hammersmith, London. His father was a hairdresser who could opera sing. Martin realised he had a skill for songwriting when he was seven years old, and was walking with a friend, when he started singing a song, when the friend asked him what the song was, Martin said it was likely a song he had heard on the radio; after a few days of trying to listen out for the song, he realised that he had made up the song in his head.

== Career ==
=== Early solo career ===
Martin signed to Piccadilly Records in 1962 and released two singles, "Cinderella Romeo" and "Blue, Blue Day". He later recorded one single for Parlophone in 1967 under the name David Lee Martin, and two singles for Page One in 1969 and 1970 under the name Seth Martin.

=== Arnold, Martin and Morrow / Butterscotch ===
In the late 1960s, Martin started writing songs with Chris Arnold and Geoff Morrow under the name Arnold, Martin and Morrow. Before Martin knew them, Arnold and Morrow were a songwriting duo based in North London, where Martin had recently moved to from West London, and he was already aware of them. They eventually met in 1965 when Morrow approached Martin, asking him to record the demo for a song they had just wrote for Billy Fury, "In Thoughts of You". Martin recorded the demo, but afterwards told the two that he thought "the middle section's a bit weak". Martin then suggested new lyrics when asked what he would do with it, and later on in the year when Fury's recording was released, Martin noticed that his new lyrics were in the song, and was soon asked by Morrow if he wanted to work with them.

In January 1970, "Love Grows (Where My Rosemary Goes)" became a UK number one for Edison Lighthouse. During the songs popularity, Martin was constantly being told by friends that his singing voice on the single was fantastic, despite the fact it was actually another singer with a similar voice, Tony Burrows, who sung the lead vocals on the song. This event inspired Martin, and after a talk with Arnold and Morrow decided to record their own pop record, so in 1970, the trio formed the soft rock band Butterscotch and recorded the song "Don't You Know (She Said Hello)", which reached No. 17 in the UK and number 18 in Ireland in June 1970. On the record, Martin sang lead vocals, Morrow played piano, and Arnold played guitar.

They also released the single "Can't You Hear the Song" in 1972 which became a hit for Wayne Newton several months later, charting at No. 3 on the U.S. Adult Contemporary chart and No. 48 on the Billboard Hot 100, as well as No. 8 on the Canadian Adult Contemporary chart and No. 32 on the Canadian Top Singles chart.

The first hit song Arnold, Martin and Morrow wrote for another artist was "It's Up to You Petula" for Edison Lighthouse. Other notable artists they wrote and produced for include Elvis Presley, Cliff Richard, Dusty Springfield, Cilla Black, Mama Cass, Sandie Shaw, the Carpenters, Gerry and the Pacemakers, Johnny Mathis, Barry Manilow, Edwin Starr and Jessie J. In 1975, they started their own record label, AMMO records.

They wrote "There's a Whole Lot of Loving" for Guys 'n' Dolls in 1975 with Martin on lead vocals; the song got to number 2 on the UK charts.

Martin co-wrote, composed and recorded the original version of "Can't Smile Without You" in July 1975. The song was written by Martin wrote about a woman he knew called Debbie, who appears with him on the original sleeve cover. Martin's version failed to chart but was later popularised by Barry Manilow and the Carpenters.

=== Later career ===
From 1979 to 1982, he was a vocalist in the James Last Orchestra. Martin released four singles in 1981 and 1982 with American singer Madeline Bell including "Together Again", which was also the title of a 2013 compilation album released on the Angel Air label.

In 1983, he co-founded Hippodrome Records with businessman Peter Stringfellow. The label released records from 1983 to 1986 for the likes of Paul Inder Band, Bradly, Edwin Starr, Dusty Springfield, the West End Boys, the Beverley Sisters, Business Connection, Frizzby Fox, and Paul Jackson.

In 1997, he recorded "Butterfly Kisses" for President Records. The single's B-side was a duet of "Can't Smile Without You" with his daughter Josie.

From December 2009 to January 2010, he sang with Louisa Parry in the cabaret show Great American Songbook, which was held at the New End Theatre.

In 2012, Angel Air released an album of recordings featuring him and Madeline Bell, titled Together Again. In 2014, Martin released his first solo album, Silky Smooth Moments, also released under Angel Air.

== Personal life ==
Martin has a wife and five children.

== Solo discography ==
Unless noted, all records were released under the name "David Martin".

=== Albums ===
Year	Title	Label	Notes
2012	Together Again	Angel Air	Recorded with Madeline Bell
2014	Silky Smooth Moments	Angel Air	

=== Singles ===
Year	Month	A-side	B-side	Label	Notes
1962	July	"Cinderella Romeo"	"Why Have You Treated Me This Way"	Piccadilly	
1963	January	"Blue, Blue Day"	"Lost in a Dream"	Piccadilly	
1967	December	"A Man Before His Time"	"I've Said It Before"	Parlophone	Released as "David Lee Martin"
1968	June	"Another Day Goes By"	"Look at Me"	Page One	Released as "Seth Martin"
1969	April	"What a Lovely Way to Spend Forever"	"Mystery Lady"	Page One	Released as "Seth Martin"
1970	October	"There's Still Time"	"Us"	RCA Victor	
1975	February	"I'm Just Mad About You Jean"	"Days"	DJM	
1975	July	"Can't Smile Without You"	"Magic Roundabout"	DJM	
1975	November	"Old Father Tyme"	"Can I Believe You?"	DJM	
1976	November	"Aria"	"Wish You Were Here"	DJM	
1978	March	"I Just Wanna Be with You"	"I Can't Sing Songs"	DJM	
1978	August	"Strawberry Girl, Blueberry Boy"	"Another Love Song"	DJM	
1978	November	"It's Gonna Be a Cold Cold Winter (Without You)"	"Orange County (From Dear Anyone)"	DJM	
1981	January	"Together Again"	"Lonely Nights"	Rampage	Recorded with Madeline Bell
1982	?	"Who's Kiddin' Who"	"Walking on Air"	DEB	Recorded with Madeline Bell
1982	February	"I'm Not Really Me Without You"	"Whatever the Time of Day"	DEB	Recorded with Madeline Bell
1982	May	"East Side, West Side"	"Love Finds a Way to Get Through"	DEB	Recorded with Madeline Bell
1997	?	"Butterfly Kisses"	"Can't Smile Without You"	President	B-side recorded with Josie Martin
2002	?	"Don't Let Us Down, Mr Brown"	"Flowers in Heaven"	Twilight	
