= Already (Edison Lighthouse album) =

Studio album by Edison Lighthouse
- Released: 1971 (Sweden)
- Genre: Soft rock, pop
- Label: Bell
- Producer: Chris Arnold, David Martin, Geoff Morrow, Tony Macaulay

Edison Lighthouse chronology
Already (1971)	Love Grows (1977)

Already is the debut album by British band Edison Lighthouse, released in 1971. It features three singles: both "Love Grows (Where My Rosemary Goes)" and "It's Up to You Petula" became chart hits in the UK, US, Canada and New Zealand, while the third, "What's Happening", became a regional hit in Australia (No. 43, Adelaide).

Three other songs on the LP were covers of international chart hits by other artists: "United We Stand" by Brotherhood of Man, "Take Me in Your Arms" by Jefferson, and "Don't You Know (She Said Hello)" by Butterscotch.

== Track listing ==
Side A

1. "What's Happening" (Arnold, Martin, Morrow)
2. "Take Me in Your Arms" (Macaulay, McLeod)
3. "That's Julie All Over" (Arnold, Martin, Morrow)
4. "Let's Make It Up" (Arnold, Martin, Morrow)
5. "She Works in a Woman's Way" (Mason, Macaulay)
6. "Love Grows (Where My Rosemary Goes)" (Barry Mason, Tony Macaulay)

Side B

1. "Don't You Know (She Said Hello)" (Arnold, Martin, Morrow)
2. "United We Stand" (Hiller, Simons)
3. "The Closer to You" (Arnold, Martin, Morrow)
4. "Take a Little Time" (Edward Light)
5. "It's Up to You Petula" (Arnold, Martin, Morrow)

== Personnel ==
- Paul Vigrass – lead vocals
- Wal Scott – lead guitar
- David Kerr-Clemenson – bass
- Andy Locke – rhythm guitar
- Eddie Richards – drums

== Singles ==
Title	Year	Chart positions																Certifications
Title	Year	US	US Cashbox	US AC	AUS	AUT	BEL	CAN	CAN AC	GER	IRE	NL	NOR	NZ	SWE	SA	UK	Certifications
"Love Grows (Where My Rosemary Goes)"	1970	5	4	20	2	—	17	3	24	8	1	13	7	1	—	3	1	US: Gold
"She Works in a Woman's Way"	1970	—	—	—	—	—	—	—	—	—	—	—	—	3	—	—	—	
"It's Up to You Petula"	1971	72	69	—	—	—	—	71	—	—	—	—	—	18	—	—	49	
