= Guys 'n' Dolls discography =

- Studio albums: 5
- Compilation albums: 9
- Singles: 26

This is the discography of British pop group Guys 'n' Dolls.

== Albums ==
=== Studio albums ===
Title	Album details	Peak chart positions	
Title	Album details	UK	NL
Guys 'n' Dolls	Released: May 1975; Label: Magnet; Formats: LP, MC	43	—
The Good Times	Released: October 1976; Label: Magnet; Formats: LP, MC	—	4
Together	Released: October 1977; Label: Magnet; Formats: LP, MC	—	8
Our Songs	Released: October 1980; Label: EMI; Formats: LP, MC; Europe-only release	—	23
Happy Together	Released: 1982; Label: CNR; Formats: LP, MC; Netherlands-only release	—	—
"—" denotes releases that did not chart or were not released in that territory.

=== Compilation albums ===
Title	Album details
There's a Whole Lotta Loving	Released: September 1978; Label: Music for Pleasure; Formats: LP, MC
The Best of Guys 'n' Dolls	Released: 1978; Label: Magnet; Formats: LP; Europe-only release
You're My World	Released: 1980; Label: Music for Pleasure; Formats: LP; Netherlands-only release
Grootste Hits	Released: 1982; Label: EMI; Formats: LP; Netherlands-only release
Broken Dreams	Released: 1995; Label: Digimode; Formats: CD
Greatest Hits	Released: 1996; Label: Temptation; Formats: CD; Netherlands-only release
The Very Best of Guys 'n' Dolls	Released: 1998; Label: Emporio; Formats: CD
The Hits	Released: 2001; Label: BR Music; Benelux-only release
From Guys 'n' Dolls to Grant & Forsyth	Released: February 2007; Label: EMI; Formats: 2xCD; Split album with Grant & Forsyth; Netherlands-only release

== Singles ==
Title	Year	Peak chart positions									
Title	Year	UK	AUS	BE (FLA)	BE (WA)	CAN AC	GER	IRE	NL	SA	US AC
"There's a Whole Lot of Loving"	1975	2	52	19	49	17	—	2	9	12	15
"Here I Go Again"	1975	33	—	—	—	—	—	—	—	—	—
"Let's All Get Together"	1975	56 (Note: Chart position is from the official UK "Breakers List".)	—	—	—	—	—	—	—	—	—
"You Don't Have to Say You Love Me"	1976	5	—	8	11	—	—	1	12	—	—
"If Only for the Good Times"	1976	53	—	—	—	—	—	—	—	—	—
"Stoney Ground"	1976	38	—	—	—	—	—	—	—	—	—
"You Are My World"	1977	—	—	1	7	—	48	—	1	—	—
"Mamacita"	1977	—	—	8	23	—	—	—	7	—	—
"Let's Make Love"	1977	—	—	—	—	—	—	—	—	—	—
"Angel of the Morning" (Netherlands and Belgium-only release)	1977	—	—	16	—	—	—	—	11	—	—
"Only Loving Does It"	1978	42	—	—	—	—	—	—	— (Note: "Only Loving Does It" did not enter the Dutch Single Top 100, but did peak at number 4 on the Single Tip chart.)	—	—
"Something's Gotten Hold of My Heart"	1978	—	—	—	—	—	—	—	48	—	—
"Same Old Way" (Japan-only release)	1978	—	—	—	—	—	—	—	—	—	—
"How Do You Mend a Broken Heart"	1979	—	—	16	—	—	—	—	12	—	—
"Our Song" (Netherlands, Belgium and Germany-only release)	1980	—	—	24	—	—	—	—	9	—	—
"Love Lost in a Day" (Netherlands-only release)	1980	—	—	—	—	—	—	—	19	—	—
"Starship of Love" (Netherlands-only release)	1981	—	—	—	—	—	—	—	—	—	—
"I Got the Fire in Me" (Netherlands, Belgium and Germany-only release)	1981	—	—	16	—	—	—	—	22	—	—
"Broken Dreams" (Netherlands, Belgium and Germany-only release)	1982	—	—	14	—	—	—	—	12	—	—
"I Heard It on the Radio" (Netherlands-only release)	1982	—	—	—	—	—	—	—	48	—	—
"Glory to the Beautiful People" (Netherlands-only release)	1983	—	—	—	—	—	—	—	—	—	—
"Freez"	1983	—	—	—	—	—	—	—	—	—	—
"Technics Commercial Song" (Netherlands-only release)	1983	—	—	—	—	—	—	—	—	—	—
"Silent Night" (Netherlands-only release)	1983	—	—	—	—	—	—	—	—	—	—
"I Feel Like Cryin'" (Netherlands, Germany and Scandinavia-only release)	1984	—	—	—	—	—	—	—	—	—	—
"Phoney People" (Netherlands-only release)	1985	—	—	—	—	—	—	—	—	—	—
"—" denotes releases that did not chart or were not released in that territory.
