= Who's in Your Head =

Single by Jonas Brothers
- Released: September 17, 2021
- Genre: Pop; funk
- Length: 3:03
- Label: Republic
- Songwriters: Joseph Jonas; Nicholas Jonas; Kevin Jonas II; Max Martin; Ilya Salmanzadeh; Rami Yacoub; David Stewart
- Producers: Martin; Ilya

Jonas Brothers singles chronology
"Remember This" (2021)	"Who's in Your Head" (2021)	"Wings" (2023)

Music video
- "Who's in Your Head" on YouTube

"Who's in Your Head" is a song by American group Jonas Brothers. It was released through Republic Records as a single on September 17, 2021. The song was produced by Max Martin and Ilya.

== Background and promotion ==
"Who's in Your Head" has been described as "another breezy tune" that is "an upbeat pop number bolted onto a funky guitar refrain and featuring some chandelier-busting falsetto", as well as "bring[ing] the funk". Brothers Joe and Nick share vocals on the chorus, singing: "I wanna know, who's in your head? / Stealing your heart while I'm still breathing / Who's in your bed? / Wrapped in your arms while I ain't sleeping / Got lost in your halo, halo / I just wanna know / Now who's in your head, in your head?". The song is lyrically about an existing relationship that ended due to their partner cheating, which also involves the person who they cheated with, and wondering of why they got together with the partner in the first place. A lyric video was released along with the song.

On September 5, 2021, the Jonas Brothers performed the song on their Remember This Tour at the Red Rocks Park and Amphitheatre in Colorado. They posted a video of it to the band's TikTok account, writing "Right now you're listening to our new song...we just performed it for the first time at Red Rocks on the Remember This tour. This song is called 'Who's in Your Head' and it drops on September 17th!". The band then announced the release of the single and cover art two days later. Shortly after the release of the song, the Jonas Brothers announced that a music video would be released, also announcing it at the end of the lyric video.

== Critical reception ==
Jason Lipshutz of Billboard praised co-writers Max Martin and Rami Yacoub, proclaiming them as "a 15-year reunion of pop powerhouses responsible for penning songs like Britney Spears' "Oops! I Did It Again" and NSYNC's It's Gonna Be Me" and went on to state that "even those unaware of the behind-the-scenes players, however, will lap up the latest JoBros offering, an ode to envy straight out of the Nick Jonas "Jealous" playbook with a delectable guitar riff that would have fit on their Happiness Begins album". Mikael Melo of ET Canada simply deemed the song as "a BOP".

== Music video ==
A music video for the song premiered on September 30, 2021. It was directed by Christian Breslauer ("Industry Baby", "The Box") who also previously directed the Brothers' video for "Leave Before You Love Me" with Marshmello. Features RiRia, an actor and former international award-winning flute player from Japan.

== Credits and personnel ==
Credits adapted from Tidal.

=== Jonas Brothers ===
- Joe Jonas – vocals, songwriting
- Nick Jonas – vocals, bass, songwriting
- Kevin Jonas – guitar, songwriting

=== Side musicians ===
- Max Martin – production, songwriting, programming, background vocals, bass, drums, synthesizing
- Ilya – production, songwriting, programming, background vocals, bass, synthesizing
- Rami Yacoub – songwriting, background vocals, guitar
- David Stewart – songwriting, guitar
- Shellback – bass, drums
- John Hanes – engineering, studio personnel
- Sam Holland – engineering, studio personnel
- Serban Ghenea – mixing, studio personnel
- Randy Merrill – mastering, studio personnel

== Charts ==
=== Weekly charts ===
Weekly chart performance for "Who's in Your Head"
Chart (2021–2022)	Peak position
Belgium (Ultratop 50 Flanders)	30
Canada Hot 100 (Billboard)	69
Canada AC (Billboard)	14
Canada CHR/Top 40 (Billboard)	18
Canada Hot AC (Billboard)	18
CIS Airplay (TopHit)	192
Czech Republic Airplay (ČNS IFPI)	36
Netherlands (Dutch Top 40)	29
Netherlands (Single Top 100)	96
Japan Hot Overseas (Billboard)	11
New Zealand Hot Singles (RMNZ)	29
Slovakia Airplay (ČNS IFPI)	38
US Billboard Hot 100	92
US Adult Contemporary (Billboard)	27
US Adult Pop Airplay (Billboard)	12
US Pop Airplay (Billboard)	16

=== Year-end charts ===
2022 year-end chart performance for "Who's in Your Head"
Chart (2022)	Position
US Adult Top 40 (Billboard)	50

== Release history ==
Release dates and formats for "Who's in Your Head"
Region	Date	Formats	Label	Ref.
Various	September 17, 2021	Digital download; streaming	Republic	
United States	September 21, 2021	Contemporary hit radio	Republic	
