= Red 2 (soundtrack) =

Red 2 (Original Motion Picture Score)

Film score by Alan Silvestri
- Released: July 16, 2013 (digital); July 30, 2013 (physical)
- Recorded: 2013
- Studio: Abbey Road Studios, London; Sound Waves Studios, Santa Barbara, California; Turtle Tone Studios, New York City
- Genre: Film score
- Length: 58:45
- Label: Lionsgate; La-La Land Records
- Producer: Alan Silvestri; David Bifano

Alan Silvestri chronology
The Croods (2013)	Red 2 (2013)	Night at the Museum: Secret of the Tomb (2014)

Red 2 (Original Motion Picture Score) is the film score to the 2013 film Red 2 directed by Dean Parisot; a sequel to the 2010 film Red, the film stars Bruce Willis, John Malkovich, Mary-Louise Parker, Catherine Zeta-Jones, Lee Byung-hun, Anthony Hopkins, and Helen Mirren. The film score is composed by Alan Silvestri and released digitally through Lionsgate Records on July 16, 2013, and in physical formats through La-La Land Records on July 30, 2013.

== Background ==
Alan Silvestri was announced as the film's composer for Red 2 in April 2013, replacing the predecessor's composer Christophe Beck. Silvestri admitted that the score demanded frenzy, danger and suspense at certain instances and utilized several instruments such as drums, keyboards, violin and orchestra. Silvestri spoke to Meredith May of San Francisco Chronicle, adding "You follow the story. If you do it well, the audience won't even notice the music. Do it poorly, and it sticks out like a bad laugh track [...] That's how you score a movie." The score was recorded at the Abbey Road Studios in London with Silvestri conducting and orchestrating the London Philharmonic Orchestra.

== Release ==
The soundtrack was released digitally through Lionsgate Records on July 16, 2013, and in physical formats through La-La Land Records on July 30.

== Track listing ==
No.	Title	Length
1.	"Main Title"	1:20
2.	"Safe House"	1:40
3.	"Speaking of Sarah"	1:43
4.	"Pentagon"	2:26
5.	"Han"	1:30
6.	"Marvin at Work"	1:31
7.	"Victoria Calls"	3:10
8.	"Han Plane Gone"	1:20
9.	"To Paris"	2:45
10.	"Paris Chase"	2:42
11.	"I Need You Frank"	1:45
12.	"Dressed to Kill"	1:02
13.	"To London"	2:46
14.	"To Moscow"	4:28
15.	"Hole in the Wall"	3:22
16.	"Sarah the Guard"	2:47
17.	"Catacombs"	3:48
18.	"Bailey Escapes"	1:52
19.	"Hangar Fight"	2:22
20.	"Entering the Embassy"	2:55
21.	"Plumbing"	2:37
22.	"London Chase"	3:53
23.	"Dasvidaniya"	2:28
24.	"Bomb Sunset"	2:33
Total length:		58:45

== Reception ==
Thomas Glorieux of Maintitles wrote "The trademark sound of Silvestri hardly grabs our attention anymore, and the many many underscore moments do nothing for the album, except prolong the experience. Again, albums don't need to add more music to the play list if that list isn't interesting to begin with. And Silvestri's Red 2 is not fun, not interesting, not anything." James Southall of Movie Wave wrote "Aside from the dated synths, there's nothing inherently wrong with Red 2 – it's just quite dull. The lack of a killer theme (something Alan Silvestri is usually better at delivering than most) is perhaps understandable; but the fact is that there's not really anything vaguely memorable here at all. You hear a lot of the familiar sounds from Silvestri action scores but they never quite develop into anything."

Pete Simons of Synchrotones wrote "The score is consistent and coherent though, if only through means of repetition. It may not offer any strong themes, it does have a number of elements (such as a synth arpeggio, a specific drumloop and a short string phrase) that form the building blocks of this score. It certainly helps to create a uniform sound throughout the album, though it doesn't offer any variations on these ideas [...] On a positive note, it is great to see Silvestri getting these high-end gigs. He may be off making wine for most of the year, but Hollywood has not forgotten about him. “Red 2” may offer few true highlights, but if you don't mind the parodic synth sound, you may well enjoy this one." Justin Chang of Variety and Justin Lowe of The Hollywood Reporter described the score as "bombastic" and "exciting".

== Additional music ==
The following songs are not featured in the film's soundtrack:

- "Can't Smile Without You" – written by Chris Arnold, David Martin and Geoff Morrow; performed by Samy Goz
- "You Can't Always Get What You Want" – written by Mick Jagger and Keith Richards; performed by Phil Parlapiano; produced by Doug Hamblin and Allan Kaufman
- "On the Road Again" – written by Alan Wilson and Floyd Jones; performed by Canned Heat
- "Tango Toscana" – composed by Jeremy Cohen; performed by Quartet San Francisco
- "Act II Scene 2: Rondo - Per pieta, ben mio (Fiordiligi)" – written by Wolfgang Amadeus Mozart
- "Howl" – written by Kyle Nicolaides; performed by Beware of Darkness
- "Given Up" – written by Chester Bennington, Robert Bourdon, Brad Delson, Joseph Hahn, Mike Shinoda, and Dave Farrell; performed by Linkin Park
- "Papa Loves Mambo" – written by Al Hoffman, Dick Manning and Bickley "Bix" Reichner; performed by Perry Como

== Personnel ==
Credits adapted from liner notes:

- Music composer and conductor – Alan Silvestri
- Music producer – Alan Silvestri, David Bifano
- Co-producer – Eye2ear><Music, Paul Katz
- Orchestra – London Philharmonic Orchestra
- Orchestration – Alan Silvestri, Gregory Jamrock, Mark Graham, Victor Pesavento
- Orchestra contractor – Isobel Griffiths
- Assistant orchestra contractor – Charlotte Matthews
- Orchestra leader – Gabrielle Lester
- Stage assistant – Matt Jones
- Keyboards – Dave Arch
- Recording – Adam Olmstead, Andrew Dudman, Gordon Davidson
- Mixing – Dennis Sands
- Mastering – Michael Fossenkemper
- Music editor – Chuck Martin, Jeff Carson
- Scoring production assistance – James Findlay
- Soundtrack coordinator – Nikki Triplett, Ryan Svendsen
- Scoring coordinator – David Bifano
- Music preparation – Joann Kane Music Service
- Art direction – Dan Goldwasser
- Executive soundtrack producer – John Houlihan
- Executive producer for La-La Land Records – M.V. Gerhard, Matthew Verboys
- General manager and executive vice president for music business affairs – Lenny Wohl
- Head of music for Lionsgate – Tracy McKnight
- Manager of contract administration – Karen Sidlow
- Senior director of film music – Trevon Kezios
- Music consultant – Allan Kaufman, Doug Hamblin
- Music budget supervisor – Chris Brown
