= Night at the Museum: Secret of the Tomb (soundtrack) =

Night at the Museum: Secret of the Tomb (Original Motion Picture Soundtrack)

Film score by Alan Silvestri
- Released: January 6, 2015
- Recorded: 2014
- Studios: Newman Scoring Stage, 20th Century Fox Studios, Los Angeles
- Genre: Film score
- Length: 56:52
- Label: Varèse Sarabande
- Producers: Alan Silvestri; David Bifano

Alan Silvestri chronology
Red 2 (2013)	Night at the Museum: Secret of the Tomb (2014)	The Walk (2015)

Night at the Museum: Secret of the Tomb (Original Motion Picture Soundtrack) is the film score composed and conducted by Alan Silvestri to the 2014 film Night at the Museum: Secret of the Tomb directed by Shawn Levy. It is the third (and final live-action) installment in the Night at the Museum film series, a sequel to Night at the Museum: Battle of the Smithsonian (2009), and the final installment in the original trilogy, starring Ben Stiller in the lead role, along with Robin Williams, Owen Wilson, Dan Stevens and Ben Kingsley. Varèse Sarabande released the soundtrack album on January 6, 2015.

== Background ==
Alan Silvestri returned to score the final installment of the trilogy. Like the previous instalments, he conducted the 103-piece orchestra and 18-member choir from the Hollywood Studio Symphony which was orchestrated by Mark Graham. Varèse Sarabande released a soundtrack album of the score on January 6, 2015.

== Reception ==
James Southall of Movie Wave called it "a more well-rounded score than either of its predecessors" further continuing, "Silvestri seeming to have more time to develop ideas and allow them to play out satisfyingly." Filmtracks wrote, "It not great music on the whole, but it will exceed your expectations." The Hollywood Reporter called the score "bombastic", Scott Foundas of Variety and John Hazelton of Screen International called the score as "astonishing" and "exciting". Daniel Schweiger of Film Music Magazine called it a "thrilling repository [which] show[s] that dust is in danger of settling on Alan Silvestri’s enchanting, and energetic enthusiasm."

== Track listing ==
All tracks are written by Alan Silvestri.

Night at the Museum: Secret of the Tomb (Original Motion Picture Soundtrack)
No.	Title	Length
1.	"The Ahkmenrah Expedition"	3:34
2.	"Performance Prep"	2:02
3.	"LOL"	2:22
4.	"The Grand Re-Opening"	3:13
5.	"The End Will Come"	2:19
6.	"Sneak And Greet"	3:25
7.	"Sir Lancelot"	3:33
8.	"Where Are Jed And Octavius?"	2:50
9.	"Main Hall"	3:24
10.	"Xiangliu"	3:46
11.	"Male Bonding"	2:15
12.	"The Legend of the Tablet"	3:11
13.	"The Escher Fight"	3:45
14.	"Camelot"	3:49
15.	"The Quest"	2:35
16.	"Seeing Your Boy Become A Man"	3:14
17.	"Laaa Love"	1:53
18.	"A Farewell Kiss"	2:40
19.	"Teddy's Goodbye"	3:02
Total length:		56:52

== Additional music ==
Other songs not included on the album but used in the film soundtrack:

- "Also sprach Zarathustra" by Richard Strauss.
- "Wizard" by Martin Garrix and Jay Hardway.
- "Shake Your Groove Thing" by Peaches & Herb.
- "London Calling" by The Clash.
- "Dancing Queen" by A-Teens.
- "(I've Had) The Time of My Life" by Bill Medley and Jennifer Warnes.
- "Got to Be Real" by Cheryl Lynn.
- "Let's Go" by Tiesto featuring Icona Pop.

== Personnel ==
Credits adapted from liner notes:

- Composer – Alan Silvestri
- Producer – Alan Silvestri, David Bifano
- Engineer – Denis St. Amand
- Recordist – Tim Lauber
- Recording – Dennis Sands, Adam Olmstead
- Mixing – Dennis Sands
- Mastering – Patricia Sullivan
- Music editor – Terry Wilson
- Music supervisor – Rebecca Morellato
- Scoring production assistance – James Findlay
- Music coordinator – David Bifano
- Copyist – Joann Kane Music Service
- Executive producer – Robert Townson

Orchestra

- Performer – Hollywood Studio Symphony
- Orchestra conductor – Alan Silvestri
- Orchestrator – Mark Graham
- Orchestra contractor – Gina Zimmitti
- Concertmaster – Julie Gigante
- Stage manager – Damon Tedesco, Tom Steel

Instrumentalists

- Bass – Nico Abondolo,^{[P]} Bruce Morgenthaler, Chris Kollgaard, Drew Dembowski, Geoff Osika, Ian Walker, Mike Valerio, Oscar Hidalgo, Steve Dress
- Bassoon – Ken Munday,^{[P]} Judy Farmer, Rose Corrigan
- Cello – Dennis Karmazyn,^{[P]} Armen Ksajikian, Cecilia Tsan, Eric Byers, Evgeny Tonkha, Kim Scholes, Giovanna Clayton, Jacob Braun, László Mezö, Tim Landauer, Tim Loo, Trevor Handy, Vanessa Freebairn-Smith, Xiao-Dan Zheng
- Clarinet – Stuart Clark,^{[P]} Don Foster, Gary Bovyer, Ralph Williams
- Flute – Heather Clark,^{[P]} Ben Smolen, Jenni Olson, Steve Kujala
- French horn – Andrew Bain,^{[P]} Daniel Kelley, Dave Everson, Jenny Kim, Mark Adams, Steve Becknell
- Harp – Jacqueline Marshall, Katie Kirkpatrick, Marcia Dickstein
- Oboe – Lara Wickes,^{[P]} Leslie Reed
- Percussion – Alan Estes, Brian Kilgore, Dan Greco, Greg Goodall, Steve Schaeffer, Wade Culbreath
- Piano, celesta – Randy Kerber
- Timpani – Peter Limonick
- Trombone – Alex Iles,^{[P]} Bill Reichenbach, Phil Keen, Steve Holtman
- Trumpet – Jon Lewis,^{[P]} Dan Fornero, Dan Rosenboom
- Tuba – Doug Tornquist
- Viola – Brian Dembow,^{[P]} Alma Fernandez, Andrew Duckles, Carolyn Riley, Darrin Mc Cann, David Walther, Erik Rynearson, Jeanie Lim, Luke Maurer, Lynne Richburg, Matt Funes, Robert Brophy, Roland Kato, Thomas Diener, Vickie Miskolczy
- Violin – Roger Wilkie,^{[P2]} Julie Gigante,^{[C]} Alyssa Park, Ana Landauer, Ben Powell, Ben Jacobson, Bruce Dukov, Christian Hebel, Darius Campo, Eun-Mee Ahn, Grace Oh, Irina Voloshina, Jackie Brand, Joel Derouin, Joel Pargman, Josefina Vergara, Katia Popov, Kevin Kumar, Lisa Sutton, Lucia Micarelli, Maia Jasper, Marc Sazer, Natalie Leggett, Neel Hammond, Nina Evtuhov, Paul Henning, Phil Levy, Roberto Cani, Sandy Cameron, Sara Parkins, Sarah Thornblade, Songa Lee, Tammy Hatwan, Yelena Yegoryan

Choir

- Choir – Hollywood Film Chorale
- Choir contractor – Sally Stevens

Vocalists

- Alto vocals – Amy Fogerson, Baraka May, Bobbi Page, Carmen Twillie, Debbie Hall Gleason, Donna Medine, Edie Lehmann Boddicker, Joan Beal, Kathryn Bostic, Vangie Gunn
- Bass-baritone vocals – Alvin Ashby, Bob Joyce, David Stal, Eric Bradley, Greg Whipple, John West, Jon Joyce, Michael Geiger, Randy Crenshaw, Reid Bruton
- Soprano vocals – Diane Freiman Reynolds, Elin Carlson, Joanna Bushnell, Karen Harper, Karen Whipple Schnurr, Monique Donnelly, Sally Stevens, Scottie Haskell, Susie Stevens-Logan, Teri Koide
- Tenor vocals – A.J. Teshin, Amick Byram, Dick Wells, Fletcher Sheridan, Gary Stockdale, Gerald White, Guy Maeda, Michael Lichtenauer, Steven Harms, Walt Harrah

Management

- Music clearance for 20th Century Fox – Ellen Ginsburg
- Music business affairs for 20th Century Fox – Tom Cavanaugh
- Executive in charge of music for 20th Century Fox – Danielle Diego
- Music management for 20th Century Fox – Johnny Choi

Notes

- ^{^[P]} Principal
- ^{^[P2]} Principal 2nd
- ^{^[C]} Concertmaster

== Accolades ==
Awards	Category	Recipient	Result	Ref.
International Film Music Critics Association	Best Original Score for a Comedy Film	Alan Silvestri	Nominated	
