= Larry Evoy =

Canadian drummer and songwriter

Lawrence Wayne Evoy is a Canadian drummer and songwriter who was the lead singer and founder of the rock band Edward Bear.

== Career ==
Evoy formed Edward Bear in 1966 with Craig Hemming. With the addition of Danny Marks and Paul Weldon, the band played in the local Yorkville scene in Toronto and landed a recording deal with Capitol Records in 1969.

Their first single, "You, Me And Mexico", was written by Evoy. Released in February 1970, it reached Number 3 on the Canadian chart and number 68 in the U.S. The band embarked on a tour of Canada to support their first album 'Bearings'. Their biggest hit, "Last Song", also written by Evoy, was released in 1972. It was a Number 1 hit in Canada and reached Number 3 in the American charts. Another Evoy song, "Close Your Eyes," also made the top 40 in the U.S., peaking at Number 37.

Evoy fronted the band through various lineup changes from 1972 to 1974, before going on to a solo career. He released a hit record, "Here I Go Again" in 1977. and a recording with Voyage Records in 1978. It became a modest hit in Canada.

He went on to run a music publishing business and a small recording studio, and ran a horse farm with his wife in King City.

In 1995, Evoy received an award from the Society of Composers, Authors and Music Publishers of Canada, acknowledging that three of his compositions had sold more than 100,000 copies.

His son, Spencer, fronts London, UK based garage rock band "MFC Chicken".
