= Don't You Know =

Don't You Know may refer to:

- "Don't You Know?", a song written by Bobby Worth and first recorded by Della Reese, 1959
- "Don't You Know" (Alexia song), the English version of "Dimmi come...", 2002
- "Don't You Know" (Kungs song), 2016
- "Don't You Know" (Pandora song), 1995
- "Don't You Know (She Said Hello)", a song by Butterscotch, 1970
- "Don't You Know", a song by Atomic Kitten from Ladies Night, 2003
- "Don't You Know", a song by Devo from Freedom of Choice, 1980
- "Don't You Know", a song by Durand Jones & The Indications, 2018
- "Don't You Know", a song by Jacob Collier from In My Room, 2016
- "Don't You Know", a song by Madonna from Pre-Madonna, 1997
- "Don't You Know", a song by Young Jeezy from The Recession, 2008
- "Don't U Kno", a song by Moka Only from In and of Itself, 2023
