= Don't Go Breaking My Heart (1999 film) =

- Film Poster
- Directed by: Willi Patterson
- Written by: Geoff Morrow
- Produced by: Bill Kenwright
- Starring: Anthony Edwards; Jenny Seagrove; Charles Dance
- Cinematography: Vernon Layton
- Edited by: Peter Beston
- Music by: Rolfe Kent
- Production companies: Aviator Films; Bill Kenwright Films
- Distributed by: BWE Distribution Inc. Curb Entertainment; Polygram Filmed Entertainment
- Release date: 12 February 1999; (UK)
- Running time: 95 min.
- Country: United Kingdom
- Language: English
- Budget: $7,000,000 (estimated)
- Box office: £961,609 (UK) (28 February 1999)

Don't Go Breaking My Heart is a 1999 British film, starring Anthony Edwards, Jenny Seagrove and Charles Dance. It was directed by Willi Patterson.

== Plot ==
Suzanne, a beautiful widow, has to choose between Frank, a philandering dentist, and Tony, a sensitive, failing sports trainer who helps her son.

== Cast ==
- Anthony Edwards as Tony
- Jenny Seagrove as Suzanne
- Charles Dance as Frank

== Production Notes ==
Dr. Fiedler played by Tom Conti is a parody of Dr Fassbender played by Peter Sellers in the movie What's New Pussycat?.

Bill Kenwright had to mortgage his own £1 million London home to pay for its production. Geoff Morrow who wrote the screenplay also wrote the 1977-hit Can't Smile Without You. Despite being second billed, Linford Christie only makes a short cameo appearance in the pre-credit scene of the film.

== Reception ==
Julianne Pidduck from Sight & Sound praised several aspects of the film, however she concluded: " But despite all efforts, an uninspired script and uneven direction fail to make Suzanne's unhappy lurches from mourning widow to tender lover plausible."
