= Butterscotch (band) =

English soft rock band

- Also known as: Arnold, Martin and Morrow
- Origin: England
- Genres: Soft rock
- Years active: 1969–1975
- Labels: RCA Victor, Bell, DJM
- Past members: Chris Arnold; David Martin; Geoff Morrow

Butterscotch were an English soft rock band which consisted of Chris Arnold, David Martin and Geoff Morrow, who are also known collectively as the songwriting and record production trio Arnold, Martin and Morrow. They are best known for their top 20 UK and Ireland hit, "Don't You Know (She Said Hello)".

== Butterscotch history ==
The bands three members, Chris Arnold, David Martin and Geoff Morrow, were a team of songwriters known collectively as Arnold, Martin and Morrow. One day in early 1970, Martin received many phone calls from his friends telling him how great he sounded singing the lead vocals on "Love Grows (Where My Rosemary Goes)" which was number one at the time; it was not Martin that sang the vocals but actually Tony Burrows, but as their voices sounded very similar people mistook it for David. This moment inspired David to made his own pop band and brought Arnold and Morrow to help him out, eventually deciding on the name "Butterscotch".

As Butterscotch, they scored their first and only hit with "Don't You Know (She Said Hello)" in June 1970, which reached No. 17 on the UK Singles Chart (remaining on the chart for a total of 11 weeks), and No. 18 on the Irish Singles Chart. Their 1972 song "Can't You Hear the Song?" became a hit for Wayne Newton, reaching No. 3 on the U.S. Adult Contemporary chart, No. 48 on the Billboard Hot 100, No. 8 on the Canadian RPM Adult Contemporary chart and No. 32 on the RPM Top 100. Their song "Can't Smile Without You", originally recorded and released by band member David Martin in 1975, became a big hit for Barry Manilow in 1978. A version by the Carpenters was also released in 1976.

In the June 13, 1970 issue of Billboard magazine, the band were featured in the General News section under the headline "Butterscotch Tour of U.S. for RCA Disk".

== Arnold, Martin and Morrow ==
As Arnold, Martin and Morrow, they wrote and produced for many notable artists such as Elvis Presley ("A Little Bit of Green", "Let's Be Friends", "Sweet Angeline", "This Is the Story"), Cliff Richard, Wayne Newton, Dusty Springfield, Cilla Black, Mama Cass, Sandie Shaw, the Carpenters, Gerry and the Pacemakers, Edison Lighthouse, Johnny Mathis, Barry Manilow, Edwin Starr and Jessie J among many others, and also released their own material under this name.

Notable hit songs include the following:

- "In Thoughts of You" - Billy Fury (1965)
- "It's Up to You Petula" - Edison Lighthouse (1971)
- "Annabella" - Hamilton, Joe Frank & Reynolds (1971) - U.S. #46, U.S. AC #21
- "Can't You Hear the Song?" - Wayne Newton (1972)
- "There's a Whole Lot of Loving" - Guys 'n' Dolls (1975)
- "Here I Go Again" - Guys 'n' Dolls / Larry Evoy (1975 / 1977)
- "Can't Smile Without You" - Barry Manilow / the Carpenters (1978 / 1976)
- "Leave Before You Love Me" - Marshmello and Jonas Brothers (2021)

== Discography ==
=== Albums ===
- Don't You Know Butterscotch? (1970), RCA Victor

=== Singles ===
Butterscotch

- "Surprise, Surprise" (1970), RCA Victor
- "Don't You Know (She Said Hello)" (1970), RCA Victor - UK No. 17, IRE No. 18
- "All on a Summer's Day" (1971), Bell
- "Some Day Soon" (1971), RCA Victor
- "Office Girl" (1971), RCA
- "Can't You Hear the Song" (1972), Jam
- "Don't Make Me Laugh" (1973), Ammo
- "Sunday Won't Be Sunday Anymore" (1974), Ammo

Arnold, Martin and Morrow

- "Who in the World" (1971), Bell/RCA Victor
- "I Believe in You" / "Sweet Angeline" (1971), Bell
- "Windows" (1972), Bell
- "Tomorrow's Song" (1974), DJM
- "Take Me as You Find Me" (1975), DJM
