= Ready Player One (soundtrack) =

2018 soundtrack albums

Ready Player One (Original Motion Picture Soundtrack)

Film score by Alan Silvestri
- Released: March 30, 2018
- Recorded: 2017–2018
- Studios: Sony Pictures Studios, Culver City, California
- Genre: Film score
- Length: 1:24:22
- Label: WaterTower Music

Alan Silvestri chronology
| Allied (2016) | Ready Player One (2018) | Avengers: Infinity War (2018) |

Ready Player One (Songs from the Motion Picture)

Soundtrack album by various artists
- Released: March 30, 2018
- Genres: Film soundtrack; compilation album
- Length: 56:31
- Label: WaterTower Music

Ready Player One is a 2018 American science fiction film based on Ernest Cline's novel of the same name, directed by Steven Spielberg from a screenplay by Zak Penn and Cline. The film stars Tye Sheridan, Olivia Cooke, Ben Mendelsohn, Lena Waithe, T.J. Miller, Simon Pegg, and Mark Rylance. The original score was composed by Alan Silvestri, rather than Spielberg's usual collaborator John Williams.

Ready Player One was the third of Spielberg's films since 1974 not to be scored by Williams, after The Color Purple (1985) and Bridge of Spies (2015). The score album titled Ready Player One (Original Motion Picture Soundtrack) was released by WaterTower Music on March 30, 2018. The same day, a compilation album titled Ready Player One (Songs from the Motion Picture) was also released, featuring incorporated songs performed by various artists.

== Background and production ==
On June 9, 2016, John Williams who received the AFI Life Achievement Award by Steven Spielberg, had stated that he will be scoring for Spielberg's Ready Player One. However, a year later, Williams exited from the project, in favor of scoring The Post (2017), another Spielberg film, which had similar post-production schedules as Ready Player One. Alan Silvestri took over the project as a composer. Silvestri had felt working with Spielberg as "intimidating" on regards of his regular collaboration with Williams. Irrespective of the film's futuristic setting in 2045, Silvestri did not want a futuristic sound, as it might feel "dated" or "emotionally hollow", but he felt that the score was all about "playing on the emotion of the characters and playing up the action, which has a very timeless feeling".

"His music is not subliminal accompaniment, but it's a central character and is intended to be noticed in a big way. Like John Williams, Alan understands the purpose of tailoring the themes you walk out of the movies humming in order to identify characters, and the epic movements in movies that are designed to be somewhat operatic."

— Spielberg on Silvestri's work in the film.

Silvestri could not provide demo score on the piano as Williams did, hence Spielberg sent an early-cut of the film and had scheduled a full-day orchestra session, after The Post's shooting completed and let him to write the score with total freedom. The recording of the score, began in mid-2017 at the Sony Scoring Stage in Sony Pictures Studios, Culver City, California. Spielberg supervised the first day of recording the film's music, and was impressed with Silvestri's composition. The brass fanfare conducted for an early scene became the film's main theme, which Spielberg had approved. The same day, Spielberg had recorded thirty minutes of music for the film, and much of the recording included in the final score.

Silvestri also simultaneously recorded the score for Avengers: Infinity War (2018), while working on Ready Player One. He felt that "it is incredible that there is this chance to write melodic, orchestral, thematic material, and there are folks that still want that". John Williams also visited Sony Scoring Stage to supervise Silvestri's recording and also complimented his work.

== Thematic references ==
At Spielberg's request, Silvestri references his own music from Back to the Future within the film's score, as well as quoting music written by other composers including Max Steiner's theme from King Kong, Akira Ifukube's main theme from Godzilla, and the score composed by Wendy Carlos and Rachel Elkind from The Shining. Silvestri commented, "There were several instances where Steven said, 'I don't want something similar to the Back to the Future score, I want the exact score and I want this particular section of it. I want it the way it was in the film.' Steven had a lot of fun with the score".

One sequence recreated the Overlook Hotel (which had been the setting of The Shining). The location consisted both physical sets and computer-generated imagery to recreate the location from that film, but Spielberg wanted the sequence to be authentic and asked Silvestri to create the score, which was more faithful to that film. Silvestri recalled it "very fun to re-create that and see how he mirrored the shots in the film".

Silvestri commented on the closing scenes: "After talking with Steven, it appeared to me that after Halliday got his bad diagnosis, he was really handing over his child to someone else. The OASIS was his creation and it was a culmination of his life's work. He designed a great way to find a new parent for this child that he could no longer care for.… And he found someone pure of heart, who loved the good things about the OASIS just as he did."

== Track listing ==
=== Ready Player One (Original Motion Picture Soundtrack) ===
All music is composed by Alan Silvestri.

Disc 1
| No. | Title | Length |
|---|---|---|
| 1. | "The Oasis" | 1:49 |
| 2. | "Hello, I'm James Halliday" | 2:01 |
| 3. | "Why Can't We Go Backwards? (Note: Contains interpolations of King Kong from King Kong, composed by Max Steiner)" | 4:18 |
| 4. | "An Orb Meeting" | 4:11 |
| 5. | "Real World Consequences (Note: Contains interpolations of "Delorean Reveal" from Back to the Future by Silvestri)" | 3:30 |
| 6. | "Sorrento Makes an Offer" | 3:34 |
| 7. | "Welcome to the Rebellion" | 3:14 |
| 8. | "High 5 Assembles" | 4:24 |
| 9. | "Orb of Osuvox" | 3:45 |
| 10. | "Sorrento Punked" | 3:57 |
| 11. | "Wade's Broadcast" | 5:51 |

Disc 2
| No. | Title | Length |
|---|---|---|
| 12. | "Arty on the Inside" | 2:33 |
| 13. | "Looking for a Truck (Note: Contains interpolations of "Godzilla Main Title" from Godzilla, composed by Akira Ifukube)" | 5:36 |
| 14. | "She Never Left" | 2:41 |
| 15. | "Last Chance" | 3:20 |
| 16. | "Get Me Out of This" | 1:35 |
| 17. | "Hold on to Something" | 5:14 |
| 18. | "This Is Wrong" | 3:49 |
| 19. | "What Are You?" | 3:29 |
| 20. | "There's Something I Need to Do" | 5:01 |
| 21. | "Main Title" | 2:26 |
| 22. | "End Credits" | 8:04 |
| Total length: | | 1:24:33 |

=== Ready Player One (Songs from the Motion Picture) ===
| No. | Title | Writer(s) | Artist(s) | Length |
|---|---|---|---|---|
| 1. | "I Wanna Be Your Lover" | Prince | Prince | 5:48 |
| 2. | "Everybody Wants to Rule the World" | Roland Orzabal; Ian Stanley; Chris Hughes | Tears for Fears | 4:12 |
| 3. | "Just My Imagination (Running Away with Me)" | Norman Whitfield; Barrett Strong | The Temptations | 3:49 |
| 4. | "Stand on It" | Springsteen | Bruce Springsteen | 3:06 |
| 5. | "One Way or Another" | Debbie Harry; Nigel Harrison | Blondie | 3:27 |
| 6. | "Can't Hide Love" | Skip Scarborough | Earth, Wind & Fire | 4:09 |
| 7. | "Blue Monday" | Gillian Gilbert; Peter Hook; Stephen Morris; Bernard Sumner | New Order | 7:24 |
| 8. | "Stayin' Alive" | Barry Gibb; Robin Gibb; Maurice Gibb | Bee Gees | 4:45 |
| 9. | "We're Not Gonna Take It" | Dee Snider | Twisted Sister | 3:38 |
| 10. | "You Make My Dreams" | Daryl Hall; John Oates; Sara Allen | Daryl Hall & John Oates | 3:11 |
| 11. | "Pure Imagination" | Leslie Bricusse; Anthony Newley | Brian Nguyen and Merethe Soltvedt | 2:33 |
| Total length: | | | | 46:01 |

Other songs not included in the soundtrack, but are featured in the film, include "Jump" by Van Halen, "I Hate Myself for Loving You" by Joan Jett & The Blackhearts, and "Faith" by George Michael.

== Critical reception ==
James Southall of Movie Wave wrote "the score just throws together a load of pre-existing material, but that couldn't be further from the truth – the way the composer pieces it all together, so seamlessly (and lovingly) incorporates all his own easter eggs, is truly remarkable. Throw in the fact that there's a killer thematic base and you get a spectacularly satisfying experience which will bring a smile to the face of anyone who grew up with scores like this." Zanobard Reviews gave 9/10 to the score and wrote "The score to Ready Player One is epic, memorable and contains some of the best action cues of recent years. The music is soft and emotional at times yet soaring and heroic when it needs to be. The lack of a great villain theme is a tad disappointing, and there could have been a couple more memorable themes in there other than the main and Rebellion ones. Still, even without them it stands out as one of the best scores in recent years. A welcome breath of fresh orchestral air which is rare in todays music."

Jonathan Broxton of Movie Music UK wrote "Much like the films it is referencing, Ready Player One is a piece of pure entertainment, where every visual reference, every throwaway character cameo, and every musical homage, took me back to those summers where I would sit wide-eyed in a darkened room, enraptured by the silver screen, loving the movies of Steven Spielberg and Robert Zemeckis, and the music of Williams and Goldsmith and Horner and, yes, Alan Silvestri." Mfiles.com wrote "Much as it's tempting to write off Ready Player One as a mere wallow in nostalgia, the movie does have a big heart, championing a period in history that gave rise to a rich plethora of games, music, literature and cinema. Silvestri's score follows suit, interweaving around the inevitable needle drops (including the likes of Van Halen's 'Jump') to craft both a sweet homage to his own style and a robustly entertaining adventure score in its own right. Both he and Spielberg are careful not to overdo the self-referentiality: they instead realise that by spotting the music carefully, and by grounding everything in a comforting air of melody and harmony, the music will work almost alchemically on the target audience. There's no doubt it succeeds. In his first collaboration with Spielberg, Silvestri has delivered a cracking blockbuster score, and should John Williams bow out in the not-too-distant future, it's clear exactly who the director should call."

Filmtracks.com wrote " this is not a perfect soundtrack, nor is there a really satisfying album for the film, but the project must still be categorized as a success for Silvestri. His collectors have been waiting years for him to crank out a score with the personality and size of Back to the Future, Judge Dredd and Van Helsing, Ready Player One is that appropriately nostalgic resurrection." Kaya Savas of Film.Music.Media wrote "Ready Player One manages to feel classic and new at the same time, and that becomes the score's biggest strengths. It's impossible to not have a smile on your face as Silvestri employs techniques and adventure stylings that he has perfected through his entire career. The music is mainly about scoring the mission at hand, and it's an amazing ride from start to finish."

== Chart performance ==
Weekly chart performance of Ready Player One (Original Motion Picture Soundtrack)
| Chart (2018) | Peak position |
|---|---|
| Spanish Albums (Promusicae) | 83 |
| UK Soundtrack Albums (OCC) | 35 |
| US Billboard 200 | 88 |
| US Soundtrack Albums (Billboard) | 21 |

Weekly chart performance of Ready Player One (Songs from the Motion Picture)
| Chart (2018) | Peak position |
|---|---|
| UK Compilation Albums (OCC) | 54 |
| UK Soundtrack Albums (OCC) | 23 |
| US Billboard 200 | 55 |
| US Soundtrack Albums (Billboard) | 11 |

== Accolades ==
| Award | Date of ceremony | Category | Recipient(s) | Result | Ref(s) |
|---|---|---|---|---|---|
| BMI Film & TV Awards | May 10, 2018 | Best Film Music | Alan Silvestri | Won | |
| Hollywood Music in Media Awards | November 14, 2018 | Best Original Score in a Sci-Fi/Fantasy Film | Alan Silvestri | Nominated | |
| International Film Music Critics Association | February 21, 2019 | Best Original Score for a Fantasy/Science Fiction/Horror Film | Alan Silvestri | Nominated | |
| Saturn Awards | September 13, 2019 | Best Music | Alan Silvestri | Nominated | |
