= Allied (soundtrack) =

Allied (Music from the Motion Picture)

Film score by Alan Silvestri
- Released: November 11, 2016
- Studios: Abbey Road Studios, London
- Genre: Film score
- Length: 42:26
- Label: Sony Classical
- Producer: Alan Silvestri

Alan Silvestri chronology
| The Walk (2015) | Allied (2016) | Ready Player One (2018) |

Allied (Music from the Motion Picture) is the soundtrack to the 2016 film of the same name directed by Robert Zemeckis. The film was composed by Zemeckis' frequent collaborator Alan Silvestri in his 16th film together, ever since their collaboration with Romancing the Stone (1984). The album consisted of 13 tracks from Silvestri's score released by Sony Classical Records on November 11, 2016.

== Development ==
Silvestri recorded the score at the Abbey Road Studios in London, after filming was wrapped and post-production subsequently began, where he saw the first rough cut of the film. He spent several weeks for researching the approach needed. For the opening, where Pitt parachutes into North African desert, he gave a musical cue from piano, bassoon and flute, with the desert accompanied unusual percussion to give a "sense of exotic piece". The composer searched for "point of access" in the scene where Pitt questions about his wife, named "C'est la guerre" that inspired a delicate theme for the family. He said "I started to think of that as an anthemic piece of music that somehow addresses the paradox of what we're seeing. You're seeing the most beautiful event known to man taking place, this birth of a new life, in the midst of the most horrible things known to man: death, destruction, brutality.

Silvestri did not allude to the period in the score, as "it was not an action score on any level" and while the film is about war, he did not need to play this as a World War II film. He augmented the 80-piece orchestra with electronic music throughout the film and reflected the period through newly recorded versions of 1940s classical songs played with gusto by London big bands. The team decided against licensing the master recordings of the original songs because of "the recording technology of the day". Silvestri added "Our perception of the sound of these is sometimes different than the reality".

== Reception ==
Music critic Jonathan Broxton gave a negative review to the album, saying "There are several Alan Silvestri scores I don't particularly care for, including some of his recent action scores like Red 2, G.I. Joe – The Rise of Cobra, and most of The A-Team, but Allied may be even more disappointing than those films because of the potential it has to inspire music of great beauty, emotional weight, and thrilling action. Just think about it: Allied is an epic love story, a wartime drama, and an action thriller, that spans the globe from the vast desert vistas of the Sahara to the bustle of 1940s London. The prospects are mouthwatering. Instead, Allied is, more than anything, rather dull, and that's one of the worst criticisms you can level at any score."

James Southall of Movie Wave wrote "Having said that, it certainly is successful in conveying a sense of longing and love, and on its own terms is an attractive piece. Most interesting by far are the new instrumental recordings of wartime standards which make up nearly half the album, but most readers wouldn't buy an album for something like that. To add insult to injury, a major error in the mastering results in several minutes of the score (split between two cues) being in awful mono sound, and reportedly the album is still being sold with that error intact at the time of writing this review, so absolutely don't buy it until it has been confirmed that has been corrected."

Pete Simons of Synchrotones commented the score as "serviceable" but lacked "real fire and passion" which led it to call as a "let-down". Bernhard H. Heidkamp of Behind The Audio, gave a fairly positive review, saying "Allied is certainly not Silvestri at his best, but it's probably safe to say, that he still has written a solid score. It has some nice, albeit brief, moments of tragedy and romance and the boring drum-textures are fortunately kept to a minimum. Allied is just okay, but a legend like Silvestri can do that sometimes. With an oeuvre like his, nobody is going to fault you for something like that, if it still has a good suite in it." Thomas Glorieux of Main Titles wrote "Of course hardly the next best thing for the trained ear, but at least it's music and not unforgettable background ambience or noise. So even though it's hardly the next best thing, I would say at least it's music. At least it's not a Red 2."

== Track listing ==
| No. | Title | Length |
|---|---|---|
| 1. | "Essaouira Desert/Main Title" | 5:21 |
| 2. | ""What Are Our Odds?"" | 2:46 |
| 3. | "German Embassy" | 2:09 |
| 4. | ""It's A Girl"" | 2:16 |
| 5. | "Trust" | 3:07 |
| 6. | ""Best Day Ever"" | 1:51 |
| 7. | "Confession/Escape" | 3:49 |
| 8. | "The Letter/End Credit" | 6:27 |
| 9. | "The Sheik of Araby" | 2:32 |
| 10. | "You Are My Lucky Star" | 3:06 |
| 11. | "J'Attendrai" | 2:59 |
| 12. | "Sing Sing Sing" | 4:09 |
| 13. | "Flying Home" | 1:54 |
| Total length: | | 42:26 |

== Personnel ==
Credits adapted from AllMusic.

- David Bifano – producer, scoring coordinator
- Thomas Bowes – orchestra leader
- Jeff Carson – supervising music editor
- Mark Cavell – executive in charge of music
- James Findlay – production assistant
- Mark Graham – orchestration
- Isobel Griffiths – orchestra contractor
- David Hage – librarian
- Tony Hulbert – assistant
- Matt Jones – assistant
- Jason Richmond – soundtrack coordination
- Dennis Sands – engineer, Mixing
- Alan Silvestri – composer, producer, arranger, conductor
- Randy Spendlove – executive in charge of music
- Robert Vosgien – mastering
- Lucy Whalley – orchestra contractor
- Robert Zemeckis – executive producer
