= Shine Your Way =

Song by Owl City and Yuna

from the album The Croods soundtrack
- Released: March 4, 2013
- Length: 3:27
- Label: Relativity Music Group
- Songwriters: Alan Silvestri; Glen Ballard; Kirk DeMicco; Chris Sanders
- Producers: Silvestri; Ballard; Adam Young

Music video
- "Shine Your Way" on YouTube

"Shine Your Way" is a song by American electronica project Owl City and Malaysian singer Yuna. The song was released on March 4, 2013, from the 2013 DreamWorks Animation film, The Croods.

== Background ==
During post-production of The Croods, Kirk DeMicco and Chris Sanders created a playlist to "evoke the feeling they wanted" for the film, in which several tracks on that playlist were by Owl City. Sanders stated they wanted Owl City, because he provides, "just the right weight and the right lift you need." According to Yuna, Silvestri reached out to Young, who also needed a female vocalist for the track.

== Composition ==
"Shine Your Way" was written and produced by Alan Silvestri, Glen Ballard, Kirk DeMicco and Chris Sanders. The song has been described as a positive and optimistic track. According to the sheet music published at Musicnotes.com, by Alfred Music Publishing, the track runs at 120 BPM and is in the key of D flat major. Young and Yuna's range in the song spans from the notes Bb3 to Bb5.

== Critical reception ==
Robbie Daw of Idolator gave a positive review for the song stating, "All the right elements, both natural and musical, are present for this one to become a radio staple this spring – and for Malaysian songstress Yuna to finally break out in a big way." The song was eligible for Best Original Song at the Oscars in 2013.

== Live performances ==
Owl City and Yuna performed "Shine Your Way" on The Tonight Show With Jay Leno on March 14, 2013.

== Music video ==
The music video for "Shine Your Way" premiered via VEVO on March 15, 2013. The video showcases Yuna and Young performing the song around the animated landscape of the film.

== Charts ==
Chart performance for "Shine Your Way"
Chart (2013)	Peak position
South Korea International Chart (GAON)	93

== Use in media ==
"Shine Your Way" was performed by the top ten contestants on the singing competition series American Idol.
