= Leave Before You Love Me =

2021 single by Marshmello and Jonas Brothers

Single by Marshmello and Jonas Brothers
- Released: May 21, 2021
- Genre: Pop; pop rock
- Length: 2:34
- Label: Republic; Joytime Collective
- Songwriters: Marshmello; Alessandro Lindblad; Nicholas Gale; Heavy Mellow; Richard Boardman; Pablo Bowman; Geoff Morrow; Christian Arnold; David Martin; Phil Plested; William Vaughan
- Producer: Marshmello

Marshmello singles chronology
| "Do You Believe" (2021) | "Leave Before You Love Me" (2021) | "Back in Time" (2021) |

Jonas Brothers singles chronology
| "I Need You Christmas" (2020) | "Leave Before You Love Me" (2021) | "Remember This" (2021) |

Music video
- "Leave Before You Love Me" on YouTube

"Leave Before You Love Me" is a song by American record producer Marshmello and American group Jonas Brothers. It was released through Republic Records and Joytime Collective as a single on May 21, 2021. Produced by Marshmello and co-produced by Alesso, Digital Farm Animals, and Heavy Mellow, the producers wrote the song alongside Richard Boardman and Pablo Bowman of the songwriting collective the Six, Phil Plested, and William Vaughan. Christian Arnold, David Martin and Geoff Morrow of the band Butterscotch are also credited as songwriters, due to an interpolation of their song "Can't Smile Without You" in the chorus of "Leave Before You Love Me". Programming was solely handled by Marshmello and mixing and mastering was handled by Manny Marroquin. It was originally meant to be sung by Zayn Malik, and his version can be heard via leaked audios on YouTube. He ultimately passed on the song and it went to the Jonas Brothers instead. Of the Jonas Brothers' members individual contributions to the song, brothers Nick and Joe share vocals and Kevin plays guitar and background vocals.

== Background ==
"Leave Before You Love Me" is a "sweet hooky pop and pop rock ballad" about regret and moving on before further heartbreak ensues. It features "handclaps, a groove and the type of vibe that should break hearts all over the globe". The song was announced on May 20, 2021, one day prior to the release of the song, in which a snippet of the song would be able to be heard if the song is pre-saved.

A lyric video was published to the Jonas Brothers YouTube channel on the same day as its release.

== Music video ==
The official music video of the song, directed by Christian Breslauer was released to Marshmello's YouTube channel on May 24, 2021. He and the Jonas Brothers perform in a subway and on a roof at night. The visuals open with Nick from the brother band sitting alone on a subway train before he joins his bandmates/brothers and Marshmello on the subway platform and later on a roof.

== Live performances ==
Marshmello and the Jonas Brothers performed the song at the 2021 Billboard Music Awards on May 23, 2021, two days after the song's release. The group also performed "Sucker", "Only Human", "Remember This", and "What a Man Gotta Do".

The Jonas Brothers performed the song at AT&T Stadium in Arlington, Texas, on November 24, 2022—American Thanksgiving Day—at the halftime of the Dallas Cowboys’ NFL Thanksgiving game against the New York Giants, alongside other songs of theirs.

== In other media ==
The song is often played on the PA system at Citizens Bank Park, the home of Major League Baseball’s Philadelphia Phillies, whenever the Phillies lose a game; although at times, The Weeknd’s song “Save Your Tears” may be played instead. Most notably, when the Phillies were on the losing end of a no-hitter in Game 4 of the 2022 World Series, the song was played right after the final out was recorded.

== Charts ==
=== Weekly charts ===
Weekly chart performance for "Leave Before You Love Me"
| Chart (2021–2022) | Peak position |
|---|---|
| Australia (ARIA) | 26 |
| Austria (Ö3 Austria Top 40) | 63 |
| Belgium (Ultratop 50 Flanders) | 32 |
| Belgium (Ultratop 50 Wallonia) | 7 |
| Canada Hot 100 (Billboard) | 7 |
| Canada AC (Billboard) | 1 |
| Canada CHR/Top 40 (Billboard) | 4 |
| Canada Hot AC (Billboard) | 2 |
| CIS Airplay (TopHit) | 3 |
| Czech Republic Airplay (ČNS IFPI) | 22 |
| Global 200 (Billboard) | 40 |
| Hungary (Rádiós Top 40) | 3 |
| Hungary (Single Top 40) | 8 |
| Ireland (IRMA) | 37 |
| Japan Hot Overseas (Billboard) | 7 |
| Lithuania (AGATA) | 31 |
| Mexico Airplay (Billboard) | 2 |
| Netherlands (Dutch Top 40) | 8 |
| Netherlands (Single Top 100) | 30 |
| New Zealand Hot Singles (RMNZ) | 14 |
| Poland Airplay (ZPAV) | 4 |
| Portugal (AFP) | 92 |
| Romania (Airplay 100) | 20 |
| Russia Airplay (TopHit) | 5 |
| Singapore (RIAS) | 15 |
| Slovakia Airplay (ČNS IFPI) | 3 |
| Slovakia Singles Digital (ČNS IFPI) | 42 |
| South Africa Streaming (RISA) | 41 |
| South Korea (Gaon) | 111 |
| Sweden Heatseeker (Sverigetopplistan) | 19 |
| Ukraine Airplay (TopHit) | 9 |
| UK Singles (Official Charts) | 24 |
| US Billboard Hot 100 | 19 |
| US Adult Contemporary (Billboard) | 6 |
| US Adult Pop Airplay (Billboard) | 5 |
| US Pop Airplay (Billboard) | 9 |
| US Rolling Stone Top 100 | 41 |

2023 weekly chart performance
| Chart (2023) | Peak position |
|---|---|
| Belarus Airplay (TopHit) | 143 |
| Kazakhstan Airplay (TopHit) | 63 |

=== Year-end charts ===
2021 year-end chart performance for "Leave Before You Love Me"
| Chart (2021) | Position |
|---|---|
| Australia (ARIA) | 85 |
| Belgium (Ultratop Wallonia) | 48 |
| Canada (Canadian Hot 100) | 25 |
| CIS (TopHit) | 36 |
| Global 200 (Billboard) | 138 |
| Hungary (Single Top 40) | 57 |
| Netherlands (Dutch Top 40) | 22 |
| Netherlands (Single Top 100) | 81 |
| Poland (ZPAV) | 40 |
| Russia Airplay (TopHit) | 40 |
| US Billboard Hot 100 | 63 |
| US Adult Contemporary (Billboard) | 24 |
| US Adult Top 40 (Billboard) | 15 |
| US Mainstream Top 40 (Billboard) | 32 |

2022 year-end chart performance for "Leave Before You Love Me"
| Chart (2022) | Position |
|---|---|
| Canada (Canadian Hot 100) | 61 |
| Hungary (Rádiós Top 40) | 33 |
| Poland (ZPAV) | 95 |
| Russia Airplay (TopHit) | 61 |
| Ukraine Airplay (TopHit) | 12 |
| US Adult Contemporary (Billboard) | 12 |

2023 year-end chart performance for "Leave Before You Love Me"
| Chart (2023) | Position |
|---|---|
| Hungary (Rádiós Top 40) | 92 |
| Russia Airplay (TopHit) | 187 |
| Ukraine Airplay (TopHit) | 112 |

== Certifications ==
Certifications for "Leave Before You Love Me"
| Region | Certification | Certified units/sales |
|---|---|---|
| Australia (ARIA) | 2× Platinum | 140,000^{‡} |
| Brazil (Pro-Música Brasil) | 3× Platinum | 120,000^{‡} |
| Denmark (IFPI Danmark) | Platinum | 90,000^{‡} |
| France (SNEP) | Gold | 100,000^{‡} |
| Italy (FIMI) | Gold | 50,000^{‡} |
| New Zealand (RMNZ) | 3× Platinum | 90,000^{‡} |
| Poland (ZPAV) | 2× Platinum | 100,000^{‡} |
| Portugal (AFP) | Gold | 5,000^{‡} |
| Spain (Promusicae) | Platinum | 60,000^{‡} |
| United Kingdom (BPI) | Platinum | 600,000^{‡} |
| United States (RIAA) | 2× Platinum | 2,000,000^{‡} |
^{‡} Sales+streaming figures based on certification alone.

== Release history ==
Release dates and formats for "Leave Before You Love Me"
| Region | Date | Formats | Label | Ref. |
|---|---|---|---|---|
| Various | May 21, 2021 | Digital download; streaming | Republic | |
