= Remember This Tour =

2021–22 concert tour by the Jonas Brothers

- Continental tour by Jonas Brothers
- Promotional poster for the tour
- Location: North America
- Start date: August 20, 2021
- End date: September 2, 2022
- No. of shows: 52
- Supporting acts: Kelsea Ballerini, Jordan McGraw
- Attendance: 529,000
- Box office: $42.5 million

Jonas Brothers concert chronology
- Happiness Begins Tour (2019–2020); Remember This Tour (2021–2022); Jonas Brothers on Broadway (2023)

The Remember This Tour was the eleventh concert tour by the Jonas Brothers. The tour began in Las Vegas at the Park Theater and concluded in Monterrey at the Arena Monterrey.

== Background ==
On May 18, 2021, the band first teased a video on social media where they are calling Kelsea Ballerini via FaceTime, hinting an announcement. On the same day, a couple venues started posting pictures of their marquees on their social media reading "Remember This" and a scheduled date for the tour. On May 19, 2021, the full tour was announced, consisting of 44 dates. Later, the band announced additional dates, adding up to a total of 52 shows.

== Promotion ==
To promote the tour, the band released a single title "Remember This", that was released on June 18, 2021 through Republic Records. The song was featured during NBC's U.S. Olympic trials coverage on June 18, 2021.

Further promotion for the song, as well as the tour, tied into NBC's coverage of the 2020 Summer Olympics: a special Olympics-themed version of "Remember This" premiered during an NBC primetime special on July 21, Olympic Dreams Featuring Jonas Brothers, which featured the brothers competing in sports-themed challenges mentored by U.S. Olympic athletes such as Sydney McLaughlin-Levrone, Sanya Richards-Ross, and Alise Willoughby. Additionally, NBC's telecast of the closing ceremony featured a live performance of "Remember This" set to highlights from the Games.

== Set list ==
The following set list is representative of August 20, in Las Vegas and does not represent the entire duration of the tour.

1. "Remember This"
2. "Only Human"
3. "What a Man Gotta Do"
4. "Leave Before You Love Me"
5. "Cool"
6. "Burnin' Up"
7. "Cake by the Ocean"
8. "Toothbrush"
9. "S.O.S."
10. "Hold On"
11. "Fly With Me"
12. "Lovebug"
13. "Mercy"
14. "Close"
15. "Jealous"
16. "Strangers"
17. "Shelf"
18. "Paranoid"
19. "Year 3000"
20. "Sucker"

== Tour dates ==
List of North American concerts
Date	City	Country	Venue	Opening act(s)
August 20, 2021	Las Vegas	United States	Park Theater	Kelsea Ballerini; Jordan McGraw
August 21, 2021	Las Vegas	United States	Park Theater	Kelsea Ballerini; Jordan McGraw
August 25, 2021	Chula Vista	United States	North Island Credit Union Amphitheatre	Jordan McGraw; Carter Ace; Sitting on Stacy
August 27, 2021	Mountain View	United States	Shoreline Amphitheatre	Jordan McGraw; Carter Ace; Sitting on Stacy
August 28, 2021	Wheatland	United States	Toyota Amphitheatre	Jordan McGraw; Carter Ace; Sitting on Stacy; Livvia
August 30, 2021	Auburn	United States	White River Amphitheatre	Kelsea Ballerini; Jordan McGraw
September 1, 2021	Ridgefield	United States	Sunlight Supply Amphitheater	Kelsea Ballerini; Jordan McGraw
September 2, 2021	Nampa	United States	Ford Idaho Center Amphitheatre	Kelsea Ballerini; Jordan McGraw
September 3, 2021	West Valley City	United States	USANA Amphitheatre	Kelsea Ballerini; Jordan McGraw
September 5, 2021	Morrison	United States	Red Rocks Amphitheatre	Kelsea Ballerini; Jordan McGraw
September 7, 2021	Maryland Heights	United States	Hollywood Casino Amphitheatre	Kelsea Ballerini; Jordan McGraw
September 8, 2021 (Note: The concert on September 8, 2021, at the American Family Insurance Amphitheater in Milwaukee was part of Summerfest.)	Milwaukee	United States	American Family Insurance Amphitheater	Spencer Sutherland; Jordan McGraw; Kelsea Ballerini
September 9, 2021	Noblesville	United States	Ruoff Music Center	Kelsea Ballerini; Jordan McGraw
September 11, 2021	Prior Lake	United States	Mystic Amphitheater	Kelsea Ballerini; Jordan McGraw
September 12, 2021	Tinley Park	United States	Hollywood Casino Amphitheatre	Kelsea Ballerini; Jordan McGraw
September 14, 2021	Clarkston	United States	DTE Energy Music Theatre	Kelsea Ballerini (Note: Jordan McGraw's set was cut due to weather conditions.)
September 16, 2021	Franklin	United States	FirstBank Amphitheater	Kelsea Ballerini; Jordan McGraw; Lanie Gardner
September 17, 2021	Franklin	United States	FirstBank Amphitheater	Kelsea Ballerini; Jordan McGraw; Lanie Gardner
September 18, 2021 (Note: Part of Music Midtown.)	Atlanta	United States	Piedmont Park	—
September 21, 2021	Cincinnati	United States	Riverbend Music Center	Kelsea Ballerini; Jordan McGraw
September 22, 2021	Cuyahoga Falls	United States	Blossom Music Center	Kelsea Ballerini; Jordan McGraw
September 24, 2021	Hershey	United States	Hersheypark Stadium	Kelsea Ballerini; Jordan McGraw
September 25, 2021	Darien	United States	Darien Lake Performing Arts Center	Kelsea Ballerini; Jordan McGraw
September 26, 2021	Geddes	United States	St. Joseph's Health Amphitheater	Kelsea Ballerini; Jordan McGraw
September 28, 2021	Saratoga Springs	United States	Saratoga Performing Arts Center	Kelsea Ballerini; Jordan McGraw
September 29, 2021	Hartford	United States	Xfinity Theatre	Kelsea Ballerini; Jordan McGraw
October 1, 2021	Boston	United States	Fenway Park	Kelsea Ballerini; Jordan McGraw
October 2, 2021	Wantagh	United States	Northwell Health at Jones Beach Theater	Kelsea Ballerini; Jordan McGraw; Carter Ace; Lanie Gardner
October 5, 2021	Holmdel	United States	PNC Bank Arts Center	Kelsea Ballerini; Jordan McGraw; Carter Ace; Lanie Gardner
October 6, 2021	Burgettstown	United States	The Pavilion at Star Lake	Kelsea Ballerini; Jordan McGraw; Carter Ace; Lanie Gardner
October 7, 2021	Camden	United States	BB&T Pavilion	Kelsea Ballerini; Jordan McGraw; Carter Ace; Lanie Gardner
October 9, 2021	Virginia Beach	United States	Veterans United Home Loans Amphitheater	Kelsea Ballerini; Jordan McGraw
October 10, 2021	Bristow	United States	Jiffy Lube Live	Kelsea Ballerini; Jordan McGraw
October 12, 2021	Raleigh	United States	Coastal Credit Union Music Park	Kelsea Ballerini; Jordan McGraw
October 13, 2021	Charlotte	United States	PNC Music Pavilion	Kelsea Ballerini; Jordan McGraw
October 15, 2021	Jacksonville	United States	Daily's Place	Kelsea Ballerini; Jordan McGraw
October 16, 2021	Tampa	United States	MidFlorida Credit Union Amphitheatre	Kelsea Ballerini; Jordan McGraw
October 17, 2021	West Palm Beach	United States	iTHINK Financial Amphitheatre	Kelsea Ballerini; Jordan McGraw
October 19, 2021	Pelham	United States	Oak Mountain Amphitheatre	Kelsea Ballerini; Jordan McGraw
October 21, 2021	Rogers	United States	Walmart Arkansas Music Pavilion	Kelsea Ballerini; Jordan McGraw
October 22, 2021	Dallas	United States	Dos Equis Pavilion	Kelsea Ballerini; Jordan McGraw
October 23, 2021	The Woodlands	United States	Cynthia Woods Mitchell Pavilion	Kelsea Ballerini; Jordan McGraw
October 26, 2021	Phoenix	United States	Ak-Chin Pavilion	Kelsea Ballerini; Jordan McGraw; Carter Ace
October 27, 2021	Los Angeles	United States	Hollywood Bowl	Kelsea Ballerini; Jordan McGraw
December 10, 2021 (Note: The concert on December 10, 2021, at Madison Square Garden in New York City was part of the iHeartRadio Jingle Ball.)	New York City	United States	Madison Square Garden	—
December 12, 2021 (Note: The concert on December 12, 2021, at the TD Garden in Boston was part of the KISS 108 Jingle Ball.)	Boston	United States	TD Garden	—
December 14, 2021 (Note: The concert on December 14, 2021, at the Capital One Arena in Washington, D.C., was part of the HOT 99.5 Jingle Ball.)	Washington, D.C.	United States	Capital One Arena	—
December 16, 2021 (Note: The concert on December 16, 2021, at the Capital One Arena in Atlanta was part of the iHeartRadio's Power 96.1 Jingle Ball.)	Atlanta	United States	State Farm Arena	—
August 29, 2022	Mexico City	Mexico	Mexico City Arena	Lasso; Sitting on Stacy
August 30, 2022	Mexico City	Mexico	Mexico City Arena	Lasso; Sitting on Stacy
September 1, 2022	Monterrey	Mexico	Arena Monterrey	Lasso; Sitting on Stacy
September 2, 2022	Monterrey	Mexico	Arena Monterrey	Lasso; Sitting on Stacy
