= The Croods (soundtrack) =

2013 film soundtrack album

Film score by Alan Silvestri
- Released: March 15, 2013
- Recorded: 2012–2013
- Studios: Abbey Road Studios, London; Sound Waves Studios, Santa Barbara, California; Augury, Hollywood, California; Hot Rocks Studios, Santa Monica, California
- Genre: Film score
- Length: 70:16
- Labels: Relativity Music Group; Sony Classical
- Producers: Alan Silvestri; David Bifano

Alan Silvestri chronology
Flight (2012)	The Croods (2013)	Red 2 (2013)

The Croods (Music from the Motion Picture) is the soundtrack album composed by Alan Silvestri for the film of the same name and released by Relativity Music Group digitally on March 15, 2013, and in physical formats by Sony Classical Records on March 26. The single "Shine Your Way", performed by Owl City and Yuna, was released on March 4.

== Background ==
Alan Silvestri, who previously collaborated with Sanders on Lilo & Stitch (2002) had composed the musical score for The Croods, marking his maiden association with DreamWorks. Silvestri added that the challenge was in syncing his work process, where everyone had worked passionately in this film. Firstly, he was presented with a schedule of review where for each two weeks he had a Skype session with the team reviewing his progress. During the sixth review, Silvestri felt he "haven’t rung anybody’s bell yet and it was starting to feel like a problem" and thought of walking away from the film, and write two thematic pieces of music which were not for a specific scene. He felt it like a technical challenge to sync his creative process with the team's, but they were nervous as him in the beginning. He eventually took one of the challenging scenes and then wrote the whole cue, which he had a mock up of it and the team did not reject, though he had a fake praise. Eventually, Silvestri had bonded with the team and provided great inputs to the film.

Silvestri focused on creating a family theme that evolved throughout the film. Sanders admitted that the music is one of the "most powerful storytelling tool" the team had, considering it to be "the realm of magic and witchcraft". He noted there are moments in the film without dialogues, especially where a character has a change of heart, and felt the use of music can aid the story in place of the dialogues so that it could carry the necessary emotions, and felt he and Kirk can engineer such moments musically.

The score was recorded at the Abbey Road Studios in London. Sanders felt that being at the scoring stage is "indescribably amazing", as he added "I was in the high school band, and it took my ages to learn one piece of music. These musicians will open their music folder and look at a piece for the very first time, then look up at Alan, and what happens next is what you hear on screen! I still don’t understand how they do that!" The USC Trojan Marching Band performed the opening track "Smash and Grab" which incorporates fragments of Fleetwood Mac's "Tusk" (1979).

== Release ==
The soundtrack featured an original song "Shine Your Way" performed by the electronica musical project Owl City and Malaysian singer Yuna. It was released under the Relativity Music Group label on March 4, 2013 as the lead single from the album. The 23-track album was released through Relativity Music Group digitally on March 15, while the physical editions were distributed by Sony Classical Records on March 26. The iTunes version of the album featured a remix of "Shine Your Way" by Adam Young, which is only present in this edition of the album.

== Reception ==
Jonathan Broxton of Movie Music UK wrote, "There's nothing inherently wrong with The Croods at all. It's well composed, intelligently designed, has recurring themes and motifs, and some moments of real power and beauty. There are some unusual stylistic choices dotted around here and there, but that's to be expected in a children's animated film, and doesn't diminish the score as a while [...] Fans of Silvestri's richly textured orchestral writing will find a lot to enjoy, and a great deal of the score is wonderfully entertaining on its own terms." Pete Simons of Synchrotones wrote, "Overall, though particularly during the first half, the album does suffer a little from mickey-mousing. There are plenty of highlights and the second half does become more coherent, not least through two lengthy concert suites of the score's main theme. And fine soaring themes they are! As an album it's not quite perfect, but it is tremendously good fun!"

Filmtracks wrote, "Much of The Croods will strike film score listeners as derivative, but Silvestri executes the expected formula well enough to make the score an enjoyable listening experience should you be seeking this atmospheric cheeriness. These scores are not as easy to pull off as one might think, and the crisp orchestrations, the thematic integrity, the neat Predator references, and the right balance of emotional and stylistic appeals make this one recommended over many of its peers. A very strong 15 to 20-minute compilation assembled from the long album awaits any enthusiast of children's scores." Thomas Glorieux of Maintitles wrote "In parts, and most definitely in the second part The Croods becomes a thoroughly enjoyable experience. Rich with concert performances, orchestral fanfares and choral eruptions in what is essentially a typical (at least for him) Alan Silvestri experience, with that exception it's so much better than most of today's composers output."

In contrast, James Southall of Movie Wave wrote "Twinkly kiddie music alternates with slightly Zimmerish tribal percussion and some thunderous, trademark Silvestri action music. Each of the elements is done well and it's all very technically accomplished – sadly the whole seems a lot less than the sum of its parts, with the Mickey Mousing getting pretty tiresome after a while (and the album lasts for a lot longer than a while) – in recent years Randy Newman displayed a mastery of this technique in his Pixar scores, but this is a long way short of that standard, at least in terms of an album listening experience." David D'Arcy of Screen International wrote "Music by Alan Silvestri could fit a documentary on sports achievement, ideal for parents who want their kids to outrun monsters and solve problems." David Rooney of The Hollywood Reporter called it a "hard-working score".

== Track listing ==
No.	Title	Length
1.	"Shine Your Way" (performed by Owl City and Yuna)	3:27
2.	"Prologue"	2:07
3.	"Smash and Grab (feat. USC Marching Band)"	4:09
4.	"Bear Owl Escape"	2:45
5.	"Eep and the Warthog"	3:52
6.	"Teaching Fire to Tiger Girl"	1:54
7.	"Exploring New Dangers"	3:33
8.	"Piranhakeets"	2:25
9.	"Fire and Corn"	2:06
10.	"Turkey Fish Follies"	4:17
11.	"Going Guys Way"	3:15
12.	"Story Time"	3:55
13.	"Family Maze"	3:21
14.	"Star Canopy"	2:07
15.	"Grug Flips His Lid"	1:44
16.	"Planet Collapse"	1:44
17.	"We'll Die If We Stay Here"	5:28
18.	"Cave Painting"	1:12
19.	"Big Idea"	2:34
20.	"Epilogue"	4:25
21.	"Cave Painting Theme"	2:52
22.	"The Crood's Family Theme"	5:54
23.	"Cantina Croods"	1:12
Total length:		70:16

iTunes bonus track
No.	Title	Length
24.	"Shine Your Way (Adam Young Remix)" (performed by Owl City feat. Yuna)	3:19

== Personnel ==
Credits adapted from liner notes:

- Music composer and conductor – Alan Silvestri
- Music producer – Alan Silvestri, David Bifano
- Orchestrators – Alan Silvestri, John Ashton Thomas, Mark Graham, Victor Pesavento, William Ross
- Orchestra leader – Thomas Bowes
- Orchestra contractor – Isobel Griffiths
- Assistant orchestra contractor – Jo Changer
- Choir – London Voices
- Choirmaster – Ben Parry, Terry Edwards
- Recording – Dennis Sands, Peter Cobbin
- Recordist – Lewis Jones
- Mixing – Dennis Sands
- Mastering – Pat Sullivan
- Score editor – Joe E. Rand, Barbara McDermott
- Pro-tools – Adam Olmstead
- Score production assistant – James Findlay
- Music supervisor – David Bifano
- Music consultant – Charlene Ann Huang
- Executive producer – Bob Bowen, Jason Markey, Ryan Kavanaugh
- Music coordinator – Roger Tang
- Music librarian – Mark Graham
- Stage assistant – Matt Jones
- Studio manager – Colette Barber
- Executive in charge of music – Sunny Park
- Music clearances – Julie Butchko

== Accolades ==
Award	Date of ceremony	Category	Recipient(s)	Result	Ref.
Annie Awards	February 1, 2014	Outstanding Achievement for Music in a Feature Production	Alan Silvestri	Nominated	
BMI Film & TV Awards	May 15, 2013	BMI Film Music Awards	Alan Silvestri (Note: Also for The Avengers (2012) and Flight (2012))	Won	
International Film Music Critics Association Awards	February 20, 2014	Best Original Score for an Animated Film	Alan Silvestri	Nominated	
