= Edward Bear =

Canadian band

Edward Bear was a Toronto-based Canadian pop-rock group. The band is best known for its chart-topping singles, "You, Me and Mexico", "Last Song", and "Close Your Eyes", used as the signing-off song for Delilah's radio show.

== History ==
The Edward Bear Revue, later Edward Bear, was formed in 1966 by singer and percussionist Larry Evoy and bassist Craig Hemming. Craig Hemming was only with the band a short time. The effective founders were Larry Evoy and Paul Weldon. The name is derived from A.A. Milne's Winnie the Pooh, whose "proper" name is Edward Bear. At first the band had a bluesy, rock sound; at one point they opened for Led Zeppelin.

The band signed with Capitol Records in 1969 with a lineup of Evoy, guitarist/vocalist Danny Marks and keyboardist/vocalist Paul Weldon. Their sound moved toward blues and pop. They released an album, Bearings, that year. Their single, "You, Me and Mexico", was a Top 5 hit in Canada and charted well in the United States. Follow-up songs, "You Can't Deny It" and "Spirit Song" did not prove popular. Marks left the band the following year and was succeeded by guitarist/vocalist Roger Ellis.

The band recorded several albums; the songs were mainly written by the band members. There were several chart successes in the early 1970s, including "Fly Across the Sea" and "Masquerade". The band had its biggest hit in 1973, when "Last Song" charted at #1 in Canada and peaked at #3 in the U.S. Billboard Hot 100. It was awarded a gold disc in March 1973 for selling over one million copies by the Recording Industry Association of America. "Close Your Eyes" was a Top 5 hit in Canada and also made the charts in the United States.

Edward Bear won a Juno Award in 1973 for outstanding group performance. By then, most of the band's original lineup had left. Evoy remained as the primary songwriter and organizer, rebuilding the band twice, until it finally was disbanded in 1974.

Evoy, who briefly embraced Scientology in 1973 (the band also recorded a jingle in 1973 for a Scientology TV commercial, and also mentioned it on the back cover of their 1973 album, Close Your Eyes), went on to a solo career, achieving a modest hit in Canada with "Here I Go Again," after which he retired from live performance and began running a small recording studio. Marks has continued a career as a blues guitarist and radio host. Weldon, who passed away January 2, 2025, was a professional architect who owned and operated the graphic design firm Stanford Designs for many years and performed with a jazz combo and taught at Seneca College in Toronto. Bill Loop, bassist in the early 1970s, resides in Southwestern Ontario and plays locally with various session musicians. He also teaches guitar.

== Discography ==
=== Albums ===
- Bearings, 1969. (Can. #44)

Guitar Intro, "You, Me And Mexico", "Fool", "Cinder Dream", "Woodwind Song", "Hideaway", "Mind Police", "Toe Jam", "Sinking Ship", "Every Day I Have the Blues", "Guitar Coda". Musicians: Danny Marks, Paul Weldon and Larry Evoy.

- Eclipse, 1970. (Can. #84)

"Four Months Out To Africa", "Chris' Song", "You Can't Deny It", "Pickering Tower", "T-1 Blues", "Pirate King", "Long Forgotten Day, "Monday". Musicians: Danny Marks, Paul Weldon, Larry Evoy.

- Edward Bear, 1973. (Can. #5; U.S. #63)

"Last Song", "Private School Girls", "Fly Across The Sea", "Edgware Station", "Cachet County", "Masquerade", "Back Home Again", "Best Friend", "Ease Me Down", "Black Pete". Musicians: Roger Ellis, Paul Weldon, Larry Evoy.

- Close Your Eyes, 1973. (Can. #76; U.S. #183)

"Close Your Eyes" (U.S. #37, Canada #3 for two weeks), "Some Sunny Day", "I Love Her (You Love Me)", "Nowhere Is Karen Around", "Does Your Mother Know", "Fool", "What You Done", "Walking On Back", "Haven't You Touched Him", "All The Lights Were Shining"

- The Best of the Bear, 1986 (compilation)
- The Edward Bear Collection, 1991 (compilation).

"You Me & Mexico", "Fly Across The Sea", "Masquerade", "Last Song", "Close Your Eyes", "Fool", "Same Old Feeling", "Freedom For The Stallion", "On & On", "God Bless Now", "I Had Dreams", "She Loves A Parade", "You & I", "Not Dreaming About You", "You Can't Deny It"

=== Singles ===
Year	Song	CAN	U.S.	AUS	CAN AC	U.S. AC
1970	"You, Me and Mexico"	3	68	—	27	38
1970	"You Can't Deny It"	16	—	—	—	—
1971	"Spirit Song"	81	—	—	—	—
1972	"Fly Across the Sea"	18	—	—	—	—
1972	"Masquerade"	7	—	—	16	—
1972	"Last Song"	1	3	2	1	1
1973	"Close Your Eyes"	3	37	73	4	11
1973	"Walking on Back"	33	115	—	—	—
1973	"Coming Home Christmas"	—	—	—	—	—
1974	"Same Old Feeling"	36	—	—	—	—
1974	"Freedom for the Stallion"	20	—	—	—	—

== Band members ==
- Lead vocals
  - Larry Evoy (1966–1974)
  - Peter Johnson (1972-1974)
- Bass guitar
  - Craig Hemming (1966–1969)
  - Bill Loop (1970–1974)
  - Bo Tanas (1974)
- Drums
  - Dave Brown (1966–?)
  - Larry Evoy (?–1974)
- Guitar
  - Danny Marks (1966–1970)
  - Roger Ellis (1970–1974)
  - James Anthony (1975) Last summer tour.(Morning Glory band)
- Keyboard
  - Paul Weldon (1966–1972)
  - Bob Kendall (1972–1974)
  - Barry Best (1974)
