= Don't You Know (She Said Hello) =

Single by Butterscotch

from the album Don't You Know Butterscotch?
- B-side: "The Closer to You"
- Released: January 1970
- Genre: Bubblegum pop
- Label: RCA Victor
- Songwriters: Geoff Morrow, Chris Arnold, David Martin
- Producers: Geoff Morrow, Chris Arnold, David Martin

"Don't You Know (She Said Hello)" is a 1970 song by British band Butterscotch. It was written and produced by the three group members, the songwriting team of Christian Arnold, David Martin, and Geoff Morrow.

The song became a hit in the British Isles, reaching number 17 in the UK and number 18 in Ireland during the spring of the year. It was their only hit record.

Robin Carmody of Freaky Trigger has described it as a gem of 1970 British bubblegum pop, deeming it "as rosily innocent as 1955, impossible even a year later".

The song was covered by Edison Lighthouse on their debut LP, Already.

== Chart history ==
Chart (1970)	Peak position
Ireland (IRMA)	18
UK Singles (Official Charts Company)	17
