= Remember This (song) =

2021 single by Jonas Brothers

Single by Jonas Brothers
- Released: June 18, 2021
- Length: 2:58
- Label: Republic
- Songwriters: Nicholas Jonas; Kevin Jonas II; Ryan Tedder; Jordan K. Johnson; Stefan Johnson; Oliver Peterhof; Michael Pollack; Casey Smith
- Producers: Tedder; The Monsters & Strangerz

Jonas Brothers singles chronology
| "Leave Before You Love Me" (2021) | "Remember This" (2021) | "Who's in Your Head" (2021) |

Music video
- "Remember This" on YouTube

"Remember This" is a song by American pop rock group Jonas Brothers. It was released as a single through Republic Records on June 18, 2021.

== Background ==
The Jonas Brothers announced a new fall tour, the Remember This Tour, on May 19, 2021. American country pop recording artist Kelsea Ballerini accompanied the tour. Through an Instagram story on the same day that the song was released, Nick Jonas announced that the song was recorded about two years before its release.

== Release and promotion ==
On May 23, 2021, the Jonas Brothers performed only the chorus of the song at the 2021 Billboard Music Awards; Nick Jonas also hosted the show that night. Four days later, the brothers appeared on The Late Late Show with James Corden on the night of May 26, 2021, in which the release date of the single was revealed.

"Remember This" would be featured during NBC's U.S. Olympic trials coverage on June 18, 2021. Further promotion for the song tied into NBC's coverage of the 2020 Summer Olympics: a special Olympics-themed version of "Remember This" premiered during an NBC primetime special on July 21, Olympic Dreams Featuring Jonas Brothers, which featured the brothers competing in sports-themed challenges mentored by U.S. Olympic athletes such as Sydney McLaughlin-Levrone, Sanya Richards-Ross, and Alise Willoughby. Additionally, NBC's telecast of the closing ceremony featured a live performance of "Remember This" set to highlights from the Games.

== Credits and personnel ==
Credits adapted from Tidal.

Jonas Brothers

- Nick Jonas – vocals, songwriting
- Joe Jonas – vocals
- Kevin Jonas – guitar, songwriting

Other musicians and technical

- Ryan Tedder – production, songwriting, background vocals, guitar
- The Monsters & Strangerz – production, songwriting, drums, keyboards, programming
  - Jordan K. Johnson – production, songwriting, background vocals, drums, keyboards, programming
  - Stefan Johnson – production, songwriting, background vocals, drums, keyboards, programming
  - German – production, songwriting, drums, keyboards, programming
- Michael Pollack – songwriting, background vocals, keyboards
- Casey Smith – songwriting, background vocals
- Kenneth Jarvis III – A&R
- Wendy Goldstein – A&R
- Gian Stone – engineering, studio personnel
- Rich Rich – engineering, studio personnel
- Serban Ghenea – mixing, studio personnel
- Randy Merrill – mastering, studio personnel

== Charts ==
Chart performance for "Remember This"
| Chart (2021) | Peak position |
|---|---|
| New Zealand Hot Singles (RMNZ) | 28 |
| US Digital Song Sales (Billboard) | 42 |

== Release history ==
Release dates and formats for "Remember This"
| Region | Date | Formats | Label | Ref. |
|---|---|---|---|---|
| Various | June 18, 2021 | Digital download; streaming | Republic | |
