= It's Up to You Petula =

Single by Edison Lighthouse

from the album Already
- B-side: "Let's Make It Up"
- Released: January 1971
- Genre: Pop rock
- Length: 2:52
- Label: Bell Records
- Songwriter: Chris Arnold, David Martin, Geoff Morrow
- Producer: Tony Macaulay

Edison Lighthouse singles chronology
"She Works in a Woman's Way" (1970)	"It's Up to You Petula" (1971)	"Everybody Knows" (1971)

"It's Up to You Petula" is a song by English band Edison Lighthouse. It was released as a non-album single, but was included on their 1971 debut release, Already.

The single became a modest international hit as a follow-up to the group's major hit during the previous year, "Love Grows (Where My Rosemary Goes)". It reached number 49 in the UK and number 18 in New Zealand. It was a minor hit in the United States and Canada.

== Chart performance ==
Chart (1971)	Peak position
Australia (Kent Music Report)	68
Canadian RPM Top Singles	71
New Zealand (Listener)	18
UK Singles Chart (OCC)	49
US Billboard Hot 100	72
US Cash Box Top 100	69
