= Avengers: Infinity War (soundtrack) =

2018 film score by Alan Silvestri

Avengers: Infinity War (Original Motion Picture Soundtrack)

Film score by Alan Silvestri
- Released: April 27, 2018 (Digital); May 18, 2018 (Physical)
- Recorded: January–March 2018
- Studio: Abbey Road Studios
- Genre: Film score
- Length: 71:36 (Physical); 116:18 (Digital)
- Labels: Hollywood; Marvel Music
- Producers: Alan Silvestri; David Bifano

Alan Silvestri chronology
Ready Player One (2018)	Avengers: Infinity War (Original Motion Picture Soundtrack) (2018)	Welcome to Marwen (2018)

Avengers: Infinity War (Original Motion Picture Soundtrack) is the film score for the Marvel Studios film Avengers: Infinity War by Alan Silvestri. Hollywood Records released the soundtrack album digitally on April 27, 2018, and in physical formats on May 18, 2018.

== Background ==
In June 2016, Alan Silvestri, who composed the score for The Avengers, was revealed to be returning to score both Infinity War and its sequel. Although Silvestri reprised the main theme he introduced in the first Avengers film, he stated there were discussions to try to incorporate each character's individual established motif in his score, "but everyone was pretty much in agreement that it would be more of a distraction to even attempt it." Silvestri started to record his score in January 2018 and concluded in late March.

Silvestri felt working on the film "was a really different experience than anything I'd done before, especially in regard to the approach and balancing quick shifts in tone." He noted that "Thanos didn't just get his own musical theme, he got his own sensibility", while the Children of Thanos were linked musically to Thanos. Silvestri avoided giving each of the Infinity Stones a theme, as he had done in Captain America: The First Avenger with the Tesseract, saying, "The music for the Infinity Stones is actually built around Thanos' reaction. Every time he got one, that moment was always significant and often times emotional." Silvestri's score is entirely orchestral. Silvestri also used Ludwig Göransson's theme from Black Panther in the film, which was something Göransson had been hoping would happen given he was not involved in the Infinity War score.

The film also includes "The Rubberband Man" by The Spinners when the Guardians of the Galaxy first appear, which was chosen by Infinity War executive producer and director of the Guardians of the Galaxy films James Gunn. Gunn revealed that "Draw the Line" by Aerosmith, "Train in Vain" by The Clash, and "Caught in a Dream" by Alice Cooper were also considered for that moment. "New York Groove" by Ace Frehley was also used in another scene with the Guardians that was ultimately cut from the theatrical release. Hollywood Records and Marvel Music released the soundtrack album digitally on April 27, 2018, with a release in physical formats following on May 18. Two versions were released, a regular and deluxe edition, with the deluxe edition featuring some extended and additional tracks to the regular edition.

== Track listing ==
All music composed by Alan Silvestri.

Avengers: Infinity War (Original Motion Picture Soundtrack)
No.	Title	Length
1.	"The Avengers"	0:25
2.	"Travel Delays"	2:43
3.	"Undying Fidelity"	5:05
4.	"He Won't Come Out"	2:31
5.	"We Both Made Promises"	2:22
6.	"Help Arrives"	4:21
7.	"Hand Means Stop"	2:37
8.	"You Go Right"	4:26
9.	"Family Affairs"	3:51
10.	"What More Could I Lose?"	3:36
11.	"A Small Price"	3:17
12.	"Even for You"	2:14
13.	"More Power"	4:07
14.	"Charge!"	3:28
15.	"Forge"	4:22
16.	"Catch"	6:04
17.	"Haircut and Beard"	3:02
18.	"A Lot to Figure Out"	2:01
19.	"The End Game"	2:17
20.	"I Feel You"	2:48
21.	"What Did It Cost?"	2:25
22.	"Porch"	0:59
23.	"Infinity War"	2:35
Total length:		71:36

All music composed by Alan Silvestri.

Avengers: Infinity War (Original Motion Picture Soundtrack–Extended Deluxe Edition)
No.	Title	Length
1.	"The Avengers"	0:25
2.	"Travel Delays" (Extended)	4:45
3.	"Undying Fidelity"	5:05
4.	"No More Surprises"	4:04
5.	"He Won't Come Out" (Extended)	3:39
6.	"Field Trip"	3:36
7.	"Wake Him Up"	4:04
8.	"We Both Made Promises" (Extended)	4:27
9.	"Help Arrives" (Extended)	5:38
10.	"Hand Means Stop / You Go Right" (Extended)	7:18
11.	"One Way Ticket"	3:27
12.	"Family Affairs" (Extended)	5:37
13.	"What More Could I Lose?" (Extended)	5:07
14.	"A Small Price"	3:17
15.	"Even for You"	2:15
16.	"Morning After"	2:08
17.	"Is He Always Like This?"	3:23
18.	"More Power"	4:07
19.	"Charge!"	3:28
20.	"Forge"	4:22
21.	"Catch"	6:04
22.	"Haircut and Beard" (Extended)	3:51
23.	"A Lot to Figure Out" (Extended)	3:08
24.	"The End Game" (Extended)	2:34
25.	"Get That Arm / I Feel You" (Extended)	4:45
26.	"What Did It Cost?" (Extended)	3:35
27.	"Porch"	0:59
28.	"Infinity War"	2:35
29.	"Old Tech"	1:06
30.	"End Credits"	7:31
Total length:		116:18

== Charts ==
Chart (2018)	Peak position
Italian Compilation Albums (FIMI)	28
New Zealand Heatseeker Albums (RMNZ)	9
Scottish Albums (Official Charts)	73
US Billboard 200	92

== Accolades ==
Year	Award	Category	Recipient(s)	Result	Ref.
2019	Grammy Awards	Best Instrumental Composition	Alan Silvestri for "Infinity War"	Nominated	
