= Can't You Hear the Song? =

Single by Wayne Newton

from the album Can't You Hear the Song?
- B-side: "You Don't Have to Ask"
- Released: September 1972
- Genre: Pop
- Length: 3:38
- Label: Chelsea Records 105
- Songwriter: Chris Arnold, David Martin, Geoff Morrow
- Producer: Wes Farrell

Wayne Newton singles chronology
"Daddy Don't You Walk So Fast" (1972)	"Can't You Hear the Song?" (1972)	"Pour Me a Little More Wine" (1973)

"Can't You Hear the Song?" is a song written by Chris Arnold, David Martin, and Geoff Morrow. The trio first released their version as a single in June 1972 under the band name Butterscotch. A few months later, the song was covered by Wayne Newton and released as a single. It reached No. 3 on the U.S. Adult Contemporary chart and No. 48 on the Billboard Hot 100 in 1972. The song also reached No. 8 on the Canadian Adult Contemporary chart and No. 32 on the Canadian Top Singles chart. It was featured on his 1972 album, Can't You Hear the Song?

The song was produced by Wes Farrell and arranged by Mike Melvoin.

== Other versions ==
- Gerry Marsden released a version in August 1974 as the B-side to his single "They Don't Make Days Like That Any More".
- Guys 'n' Dolls released a version of the song in April 1975 as the B-side to their single "Here I Go Again".
