= The Walk (soundtrack) =

The Walk (Original Motion Picture Soundtrack)

Film score by Alan Silvestri
- Released: September 25, 2015
- Recorded: 2015
- Studio: Sony Scoring Stage, Sony Pictures Studios, Culver City, California
- Genre: Film score
- Length: 56:16
- Label: Sony Classical
- Producer: Alan Silvestri; David Bifano

Alan Silvestri chronology
Night at the Museum: Secret of the Tomb (2014)	The Walk (Original Motion Picture Soundtrack) (2015)	Allied (2016)

The Walk (Original Motion Picture Soundtrack) is the soundtrack to the 2015 film The Walk, directed by Robert Zemeckis. The film's musical score is composed by Alan Silvestri and released under the Sony Classical Records on September 25, 2015.

== Development ==
In August 2014, it was announced that Zemeckis' regular collaborator Alan Silvestri would score music for The Walk. The film had lot of musical needs, which Silvestri added "The interesting thing about it scoring-wise was even up on the wire, we're having to move back and forth from a kind of comedic sensibility to a fearful sensibility to almost a spiritual sensibility." All those sensibilities were reflected on Joseph Gordon-Levitt's acting that reflected numerous moods of the film.

Silvestri wanted to build a sonnet impression for the film where part of it has been done with the continuity, so that it would provide a satisfying film scoring experience "if you can sit down, listen to the album and in a sense it's taking you back through the film." For the most part, he attempted to go in chronological order for the album. The film had most of the materials being set up while some of the lighter things were used earlier in the film, so that it tracks along with the narrative.

The first piece he composed to picture was the sequence where Philippe Petit (Gordon-Levitt) steps off the building and walks on the wire. He discussed to Zemeckis on how the score should be supervised when the latter showcased the final edit to him.

The score was recorded at the Sony Scoring Stage in Sony Pictures Studios with Silvestri conducting the 110-piece orchestra with Mark Graham.

== Reception ==
Pete Simons of Synchrotones called the soundtrack a "really wonderful, reminiscent of Cosmos and Contact." Edward Douglas of Comingsoon.net wrote Silvestri delivered "another stirring score that does a lot to make more out of even the lesser scenes. When it comes to the actual wire walk, Silvestri gives it even more tension." David Rooney of The Hollywood Reporter wrote "Zemeckis uses the jazzy strains of Alan Silvestri's score to instill the feel of a crime caper or a heist movie". Peter Debruge of Variety called it a "light-string score, which alternates between insistent and inspiring as the suspense level requires." Steve Persall of the Tampa Bay Times described it as "too-obvious midsection musical score, all cymbal sizzles and caper bass." David Jenkins of Little White Lies called it as "all-the-feels score".

== Track listing ==
The Walk (Original Motion Picture Soundtrack) track listing
No.	Title	Length
1.	"Pourquoi?"	3:30
2.	"Young Philippe"	2:10
3.	"Two Loves"	3:19
4.	"The Towers of Notre Dame"	1:49
5.	"It's Something Beautiful"	2:56
6.	"Spy Work"	1:36
7.	"Full of Doubt"	2:30
8.	"Time Passes"	4:01
9.	"The Arrow"	3:15
10.	"We Have a Problem"	5:16
11.	"The Walk"	6:23
12.	"I Feel Thankful"	7:19
13.	"They Want to Kill You"	3:56
14.	"There Is No Why"	3:56
15.	"Perhaps You Brought Them to Life (Given Them a Soul)"	4:20
Total length:		56:16

== Personnel ==
Credits adapted from liner notes.

- Music composer and conductor – Alan Silvestri
- Producer – Alan Silvestri, David Bifano
- Orchestration – Mark Graham
- Concertmaster – Julie Gigante
- Recording – Adam Olmsted, Dennis Sands
- Mixing – Dennis Sands
- Mastering – Pat Sullivan
- Score editor – Jeff Carson
- Copyist – Joann Kane Music Services
- Music librarian – Victor Pesavento

Instruments

- Bass – Bruce Morgenthaler, Chris Kollgaard, Dave Parmeter, Geoff Osika, Ian Walker, Oscar Hidalgo, Steve Dress, Nico Abondolo
- Bassoon – Rose Corrigan
- Cello – Dennis Karmazyn, Erika Duke, Evgeny Tonkha, Kim Scholes, Jacob Braun, Steve Erdody, Tim Landauer, Tim Loo, Xiaodan Zheng, Andrew Shulman
- Clarinet – Ralph Williams, Stuart Clark, Greg Huckins
- Flute – Jenni Olson, Heather Clark, Greg Huckins
- French horn – Daniel Kelley, Dylan Hart, Jenny Kim, Steve Becknell
- Harp – Marcia Dickstein, Katie Kirkpatrick
- Oboe – Laura Wickes
- Percussion – Aaron Smith, John Wakefield, Wade Culbreath, Alan Estes
- Piano, celeste – Randy Kerber
- Saxophone – Greg Huckins
- Timpani – Greg Goodall
- Trombone – Alan Kaplan, Steve Holtman, Alex Iles
- Trumpet – Barry Perkins, Dan Rosenboom, Jon Lewis
- Tuba – Dough Tornquist
- Viola – Alma Fernandez, Andrew Duckles, Carolyn Riley, David Walther, Erik Rynearson, Jeanie Lim, Marlow Fisher, Robert Brophy, Sawn Mann, Thomas Diener, Vicki Miskolczy, Brian Dembow
- Violin – Alyssa Park, Amy Hershberger, Amy Wickman, Ana Landauer, Ben Powell, Bruce Dukov, Erik Arvinder, Eun Mee Ahn, Grace Oh, Irina Voloshina, Joel Pargman, Katie Sloan, Kevin Kumar, Lily Ho Chen, Lisa Liu, Lisa Sutton, Lorenz Gamma, Maia Jasper, Marc Sazer, Neel Hammond, Paul Henning, Radu Pieptea, Sandy Cameron, Sara Parkins, Sarah Thornblade, Serena McKinney, Roger Wilkie

== Accolades ==
Accolades for The Walk (Original Motion Picture Soundtrack)
Award	Category	Result	Ref(s)
Hollywood Music in Media Awards	Best Original Score – Feature Film	Nominated	
