= Close Your Eyes (Edward Bear song) =

Single by Edward Bear

from the album Close Your Eyes
- B-side: "Catchet County"
- Released: April 1973
- Recorded: 1972
- Genre: Pop
- Length: 2:58
- Label: Capitol
- Songwriter: Larry Evoy
- Producer: Gene Martynec

Edward Bear singles chronology
"Last Song" (1972)	"Close Your Eyes" (1973)	"Walking on Back" (1973)

"Close Your Eyes" is a 1973 hit song recorded by Canadian trio Edward Bear. It was the lead single released from their fourth and final studio album, Close Your Eyes and was the biggest hit from the LP. The song was written by Larry Evoy, and was a sequel to their best-known hit, "Last Song".

"Close Your Eyes" spent 12 weeks on the U.S. charts, and peaked at number 37 on the Billboard Hot 100. It was a major hit in their home nation, where it reached number three. It was a sizeable Adult Contemporary hit in both nations, reaching number 11 in the U.S. and number four in Canada. It was the group's final top ten hit.

The song was included on their 1984 compilation LP, The Best Of The Bear.

== Chart performance ==
=== Weekly charts ===
Chart (1973)	Peak position
Australia (Kent Music Report)	73
Canadian RPM Top Singles	3
Canadian RPM Adult Contemporary	4
US Billboard Hot 100	37
US Adult Contemporary (Billboard)	11
US Cash Box Top 100	24

=== Year-end charts ===
Chart (1973)	Rank
Canada RPM Top Singles	46
