= Let's Be Friends (disambiguation) =

Let's Be Friends is a 1969 album by Elvis Presley.

"Let's Be Friends" can also refer to:

- Let's Be Friends (film), a 2005 French film
- Let's Be Friends and Slay the Dragon Together, a 2008 album by Suburban Legends, commonly referred to as Let's Be Friends
- "Let's Be Friends", a 2010 song by Emily Osment from Fight or Flight
- "Let's Be Friends" (Carly Rae Jepsen song), a 2020 song by Carly Rae Jepsen
