= Last Song (Edward Bear song) =

Single by Edward Bear

from the album Edward Bear
- B-side: "Best Friend"
- Released: December 1972
- Recorded: 1972
- Genre: Pop
- Length: 3:15
- Label: Capitol
- Songwriter: Larry Evoy
- Producer: Gene Martynec

Edward Bear singles chronology
"You, Me and Mexico" (1970)	"Last Song" (1972)	"Close Your Eyes" (1973)

"Last Song" is a 1972 hit song by Canadian trio Edward Bear. It was the first release from their self-titled third album and their greatest hit. The song is written in the key of F# major.

"Last Song" spent 18 weeks on the U.S. charts and peaked at number three on the Billboard Hot 100. It reached number one in Canada and did the same on the Adult Contemporary charts of both nations. "Last Song" was certified gold in the United States by the RIAA.

In 1994, music industry magazine RPM placed "Last Song" at number 20 on its list of the Top 100 Canadian singles since the magazine's founding in 1964.

== Chart performance ==
=== Weekly charts ===
Chart (1972–1973)	Peak position
Australia Kent Music Report	2
Canadian RPM Top Singles	1
Canadian RPM Adult Contemporary	1
New Zealand (Listener)	5
US Adult Contemporary (Billboard)	1
US Billboard Hot 100	3
US Cash Box Top 100	3

=== Year-end charts ===
Chart (1973)	Rank
Australia	20
Canada	11
US Billboard Hot 100	67
US Cash Box	14

== Inspiration ==
In an interview published on the website for the Canadian Songwriters Hall of Fame, composer Larry Evoy states that the song was inspired by his own personal experience. "It was written over a period of time and was literal. I would actually go to sleep with my light on, hoping that she’d think I was still awake and would drop by, and she did."

== Certifications and sales ==
Region	Certification	Certified units/sales
Canada	—	100,000
United States (RIAA)	Gold	1,250,000
