= Here I Go Again (Guys 'n' Dolls song) =

1975 single by Guys 'n' Dolls

Single by Guys 'n' Dolls

from the album Guys 'n' Dolls
- B-side: "Can't You Hear the Song?"
- Released: 18 April 1975
- Genre: Pop
- Length: 2:53
- Label: Ariola
- Songwriter: Chris Arnold, David Martin, Geoff Morrow

Guys 'n' Dolls singles chronology
"There's a Whole Lot of Loving" (1975)	"Here I Go Again" (1975)	"Let's All Get Together" (1975)

"Here I Go Again"

Single by Larry Evoy

from the album Larry Evoy
- B-side: "When I Don't Love You"
- Released: December 1977
- Genre: Pop
- Length: 2:53
- Label: Attic
- Songwriter: Chris Arnold, David Martin, Geoff Morrow
- Producer: Stan Vincent

"Here I Go Again" is a song by UK pop group Guys 'n' Dolls from their eponymous debut LP. The song was written by the songwriting team of Chris Arnold, David Martin, and Geoff Morrow. It became a top 40 hit for the group in the United Kingdom in the spring of 1975.

== Larry Evoy cover ==
"Here I Go Again" was recorded in 1977 by former Edward Bear lead singer Larry Evoy. The single was issued from his eponymous debut LP, which was his only album.

The song became a hit in his home nation of Canada during the spring of 1978, reaching number 55. It was a bigger Adult Contemporary hit, reaching number 17.

The song was included on the 1984 Edward Bear compilation LP, The Best of the Bear.

== Chart history ==
Guys 'n' Dolls

Chart (1975)	Peak position
UK Singles (OCC)	33

Larry Evoy

Chart (1977–78)	Peak position
Canada RPM Top Singles	55
Canada RPM Adult Contemporary	17
