= There's a Whole Lot of Loving =

1975 single by Guys 'n' Dolls

Single by Guys 'n' Dolls

from the album Guys 'n' Dolls
- B-side: "Don't Turn the Other Cheek"
- Released: January 10, 1975
- Recorded: 1974
- Length: 3:00
- Label: Magnet
- Songwriter: Chris Arnold, David Martin, Geoff Morrow
- Producers: Chris Arnold; David Martin; Geoff Morrow

Guys 'n' Dolls singles chronology
"There's a Whole Lot of Loving" (1975)	"Here I Go Again" (1975)

"There's a Whole Lot of Loving" is a song written by Christian Arnold with lyrics by David Martin and Geoff Morrow, released under the name of Guys 'n' Dolls. The song was a number-two hit in both the United Kingdom and Ireland and became the biggest hit for the group. The song was also an adult contemporary hit in North America, peaking at number 15 on the US Billboard Easy Listening chart and number 17 on Canada's RPM Pop Music Playlist. Elsewhere, the song reached the top 20 in Belgium, the Netherlands, and South Africa.

== Background ==
The song was originally recorded in 1974 by a group of session singers (including Tony Burrows and Clare Torry) for a TV advertisement for McVitie's biscuits. Guys 'n' Dolls were formed to cash in upon the popularity of the jingle and to present it as a single. However, the group was not ready in time to record an entirely new version for the single's hasty release, so the voices of the session singers remained on the single.

== Track listing ==
7-inch single

A. "There's a Whole Lot of Loving" – 3:00
B. "Don't Turn the Other Cheek" – 3:05

== Personnel ==
Personnel are lifted from the 7-inch single vinyl disc.

- Chris Arnold – writing, production
- David Martin – writing, production
- Geoff Morrow – writing, production
- Andrew Jackman – arrangement

== Charts ==
=== Weekly charts ===
Chart (1975)	Peak position
Australia (Kent Music Report)	52
Belgium (Ultratop 50 Flanders)	19
Canada Adult Contemporary (RPM)	17
Ireland (IRMA)	2
Netherlands (Dutch Top 40)	7
Netherlands (Single Top 100)	9
South Africa (Springbok Radio)	12
UK Singles (Official Charts)	2
US Adult Contemporary (Billboard)	15

=== Year-end charts ===
Chart (1975)	Position
Netherlands (Single Top 100)	47
UK Singles (OCC)	27

== Certifications ==
Region	Certification	Certified units/sales
United Kingdom (BPI)	Silver	250,000^{^}
^{^} Shipments figures based on certification alone.

== Six version ==
"There's a Whole Lot of Loving Going On"

Single by Six

from the album This Is It
- B-side: "United We Stand"
- Released: February 2002
- Studio: PWL (London, England)
- Length: 3:06
- Label: BMG
- Producers: Quizlarossi; Pete Waterman

Six singles chronology
"There's a Whole Lot of Loving Going On" (2002)	"Let Me Be the One" (2002)

The song was covered in 2002 by Irish pop band Six and was a number-one single in Ireland, where it was titled "There's a Whole Lot of Loving Going On". It became Ireland's best-selling song of 2002 and went on to become the country's third best-selling single of all time. Six's version was also a top-10 hit in Norway and New Zealand; in these countries, the song retained its original name. The single was not released in the United Kingdom, where it was deemed too "Steps-like", and because Six would have had to change their name for the UK market.

=== Track listings ===
CD single

1. "There's a Whole Lot of Loving Going On" – 3:06
2. "United We Stand" – 3:36
3. Interview with the band – 8:23

Cassette single

1. "There's a Whole Lot of Loving Going On" – 3:06
2. "United We Stand" – 3:36

=== Credits and personnel ===
Credits are lifted from the CD single liner notes.

Studios

- Recorded at PWL Studios (London, England)
- Mastered at 360 Mastering (London, England)

Personnel

- Quizlarossi – production
- Pete Waterman – production
- Bernard Löhr – mix engineering
- Mark "Ridders" Risdale – engineering
- Roe Waterman – assistant engineering
- Dick Beetham – mastering
- Image Now (Dublin, Ireland) – art direction and design
- Barry McCall – photography

=== Charts ===
==== Weekly charts ====
Chart (2002–2003)	Peak position
Ireland (IRMA)	1
New Zealand (Recorded Music NZ)	6
Norway (VG-lista)	3
Sweden (Sverigetopplistan)	45

==== Year-end charts ====
Chart (2002)	Position
Ireland (IRMA)	1

==== All-time charts ====
Chart	Position
Ireland (IRMA)	3

=== Certifications ===
Region	Certification	Certified units/sales
New Zealand (RMNZ)	Gold	5,000^{*}
Norway (IFPI Norway)	Gold	5,000^{*}
^{*} Sales figures based on certification alone.

=== Release history ===
Region	Date	Format(s)	Label(s)	Ref.
Ireland	2002	CD	BMG	
New Zealand	18 March 2002	CD	BMG	
