= Can't Smile Without You =

1975 single by David Martin

Single by David Martin
- B-side: "Magic Roundabout"
- Released: 25 July 1975
- Genre: Pop, soft rock
- Length: 3:35
- Label: DJM
- Songwriter: Christian Arnold, Geoff Morrow, David Martin
- Producers: Chris Arnold, Geoff Morrow

David Martin singles chronology
"There's Still Time" (1970)	"Can't Smile Without You" (1975)	"I'm Just Mad About You Jean" (1975)

"Can't Smile Without You" is a song written by Christian Arnold, David Martin and Geoff Morrow, and recorded by various artists including Barry Manilow and the Carpenters. It was first recorded and released by David Martin as a solo single in 1975. The version recorded by Manilow in 1977 and released in 1978 is the most well-known.

In association football, the song is commonly sung by fans of English Premier League club Tottenham Hotspur, having reportedly been used by them since the late 1970s.

== Origin ==
The song was inspired by and written by Martin about a woman named Debbie, who appears on the cover alongside Martin.

== Carpenters version ==
"Can't Smile Without You"

Single by Carpenters

from the album A Kind of Hush
- A-side: "Calling Occupants of Interplanetary Craft"
- Released: 9 September 1977
- Recorded: 1976
- Genre: Pop
- Length: 3:25
- Label: A&M
- Songwriter: Christian Arnold, Geoff Morrow, David Martin
- Producer: Karen and Richard Carpenter

Carpenters singles chronology
"All You Get from Love Is a Love Song" (1977)	"Calling Occupants of Interplanetary Craft" / "Can't Smile Without You" (1977)	"The Christmas Song" (1977)

The song was recorded on February 14, 1976 by the Carpenters and released on their May 1976 album, A Kind of Hush. It was then partially re-recorded (Verse 1) and remixed in late-1976 for possible release as an A-side single release, before being released as the B-side track for their 1977 single, "Calling Occupants of Interplanetary Craft", released in support of their 1977 album, Passage.

== Barry Manilow version ==
"Can't Smile Without You"

Single by Barry Manilow

from the album Even Now
- B-side: "Sunrise"
- Released: January 1978
- Recorded: 1977
- Genre: Pop, soft rock
- Length: 3:13
- Label: Arista
- Songwriters: Christian Arnold, Geoff Morrow, David Martin
- Producers: Barry Manilow, Ron Dante

Barry Manilow singles chronology
"Daybreak" (1977)	"Can't Smile Without You" (1978)	"Even Now" (1978)

Audio
- "Can't Smile Without You" on YouTube

"Can't Smile Without You" was recorded by Manilow in 1977 and released on his 1978 album, Even Now. Manilow also issued the song as a single in 1978 where it reached No. 1 on the Billboard Adult Contemporary chart and No. 3 on the Billboard Hot 100 chart.

Manilow's version has slightly different lyrics from the Carpenters' version such as the Carpenters's line "I can't laugh and I can't walk/I'm finding it hard even to talk" which was changed in Manilow's version to "I can't laugh and I can't sing/I'm finding it hard to do anything". The Carpenters remixed the song with additional orchestration for the B-side of the 1977 "Calling Occupants of Interplanetary Craft" single, revising the lyrics to read "I can't laugh and I can't sleep/I don't even talk to people I meet". Also, the Carpenters' version goes "Some people say the happiness wave is so very hard to find," while Manilow's version, goes "Some people say that happiness takes such a long time to find."

Billboard said that Manilow's version starts "sweetly with a soft whistle" and builds in intensity over the course of the song, similar to other of Manilow's popular songs. Record World said that it "moves at a moderate, catchy tempo with a lost-love lyric of the sort that has swelled the artist's audience."

Manilow's box set, The Complete Collection and Then Some..., contains the first take of the song.

The Barry Manilow version is closely associated with the English Premier League Football club Tottenham Hotspur. The song first became associated with the club in the late 1970s, having reportedly been played on the team coach on away trips during that era. The song is played before home matches at Tottenham Hotspur Stadium and at the club's previous home White Hart Lane.

=== Chart performance ===
==== Weekly charts ====
Chart (1978)	Peak position
Australia Kent Music Report	3
Canada Top Singles (RPM)	2
Canada Adult Contemporary (RPM)	4
New Zealand	8
South Africa (Springbok)	13
UK Singles (Official Charts)	43
US Billboard Hot 100	3
US Billboard Adult Contemporary	1
US Cash Box Top 100	2

==== Year-end charts ====
Chart (1978)	Rank
Australia (Kent Music Report)	28
Canada	20
US Billboard Hot 100	27
US Cash Box	13

== George Michael lawsuit ==
On behalf of the songwriters, publishing company Dick James Music sued George Michael for plagiarism in the mid-1980s claiming that the 1984 Wham! single, "Last Christmas", lifted its melody from "Can't Smile Without You". The case was reportedly dismissed when a musicologist presented 60-odd songs from the past century that had a comparable chord sequence and melody.

== In popular culture ==
In the film Unconditional Love (2002), the "Crossbow Killer" whistles the opening of "Can't Smile Without You," which is followed by Kathy Bates, Rupert Everett, Meredith Eaton, and Jonathan Pryce singing the song. Later in the film, Manilow joins Bates and other cast members in singing a reprise of the song.

The Manilow version of "Can't Smile Without You" also appears in Starsky & Hutch, Hellboy II: The Golden Army, and the episode "Game Face" of the first season of the television series Matlock.

== See also ==
- List of Billboard Easy Listening number ones of 1978
