= Geoff Morrow =

British songwriter and businessman (born 1942)

- Born: Geoffrey Stanton Morrow; 16 May 1942 (age 84); London, England
- Occupations: Songwriter; producer
- Years active: 1964–present
- Formerly of: Arnold, Martin and Morrow; Butterscotch

Geoffrey Stanton "Geoff" Morrow (born 16 May 1942) is a British songwriter, composer and businessman. He began his songwriting career in the 1960s and worked with Chris Arnold and David Martin as part of the songwriting and production partnership Arnold, Martin and Morrow. His compositions have been recorded by artists including Cliff Richard, The Carpenters, Elvis Presley, Johnny Mathis, Jessie J and Barry Manilow.

== Songwriting career ==
Morrow and Chris Arnold had their first major songwriting success with "In Thoughts of You", recorded by Billy Fury and released in 1965. The song was written by Arnold and Morrow and reached the top ten of the UK singles chart.

The duo then teamed up with singer David Martin, forming the songwriting and production partnership known as Arnold, Martin and Morrow. The partnership wrote songs recorded by a number of British performers, including Cliff Richard, the Shadows, Frank Ifield and Cilla Black, plus a follow-up with Billy Fury called “I’ll Never Quite Get Over You”.

Among their compositions was "Annabella", which was recorded by Dave Dee in the United Kingdom and later recorded by Hamilton, Joe Frank & Reynolds. The latter version reached number 46 on the US Billboard Hot 100 in 1971.

Arnold, Martin and Morrow also wrote several songs recorded by Elvis Presley. "Let's Be Friends", written by the three songwriters, was recorded by Presley in 1969 and released on the 1970 album Let's Be Friends. Another of their Presley recordings was "A Little Bit of Green".

In 1975, the partnership wrote and produced "There's a Whole Lot of Loving", recorded by Guys 'n' Dolls. The song reached number two in the United Kingdom. The song was released in Ireland in 2002 by the band Six, a group formed from Ireland's first-ever Popstars television talent show.

Arnold, Martin and Morrow also wrote "Can't Smile Without You". The song was first recorded by David Martin in 1975 and was recorded by The Carpenters and Barry Manilow. Manilow's recording, released in 1978, became the best-known version of the song. The song was listed by BMI among its three-million-performance songs in the United States.

=== Butterscotch ===
In 1970, Morrow, Arnold and Martin recorded and performed together under the name Butterscotch. Their single "Don't You Know (She Said Hello)", released on RCA Victor, was written and produced by the three members. The song reached number 17 on the UK Singles Chart and number 18 in Ireland.

== Business career ==
Morrow was an Executive Director of Vista Entertainments plc which in 1990 acquired the Manchester Opera House and the Palace Theatre, Manchester for £5.7 million.

Morrow was also a director and major shareholder of Caesars Palace in Luton.

He was appointed a director of Entertainment Now plc in January 2001. The company acquired the exclusive Rights from Granada to the stage version of their hugely successful “STARS IN THEIR EYES”. The live show, hosted by Bradley Walsh, toured the UK, in particular securing a contract with Butlins. The company is now dissolved.

In 2015, Morrow joined the board of Gate Ventures plc, an entertainment and media investment company. The company invested in theatre productions including Sunset Boulevard and 42nd Street. Companies House records identify Morrow as a director of Gate Ventures plc from January 2015.

== Theatre ==
Morrow wrote the music and lyrics for the musical Spin of the Wheel, with a book by Timothy Prager. The production was staged at the Palace Theatre in Watford in March 1987 before transferring to the Comedy Theatre in London's West End the following month.

Morrow and Prager later collaborated on the musical A Legendary Romance, for which Morrow wrote the music and lyrics and Prager wrote the book. The musical received its world premiere at the New London Barn Playhouse in New Hampshire in 2013. Morrow and Prager were named finalists for Best Original Playwright – Professional at the New Hampshire Theatre Awards for the production.

A revised production was staged on the Main Stage at the Williamstown Theatre Festival in Massachusetts from August 3 to 20, 2017, directed by Lonny Price.

== Film and television ==
Morrow wrote the screenplay for the 1999 British romantic comedy film Don't Go Breaking My Heart, directed by Willi Patterson and starring Jenny Seagrove, Anthony Edwards and Charles Dance.

Generation Films was involved in the production of the documentary Theodor Herzl: The Man Behind Israel, directed by James Dann and Dominic Howlett and presented by David Baddiel, with Stephen Fry appearing in the film. Morrow was credited as one of its producers. The film was described by the London-based Leo Baeck Institute as a 2025 British documentary, with Morrow and Sir Bernard Zissman among its producers.

== Personal life ==
Morrow is married with six children.

== See also ==
- Soft rock
- Beat music
