= Edison Lighthouse =

English pop band

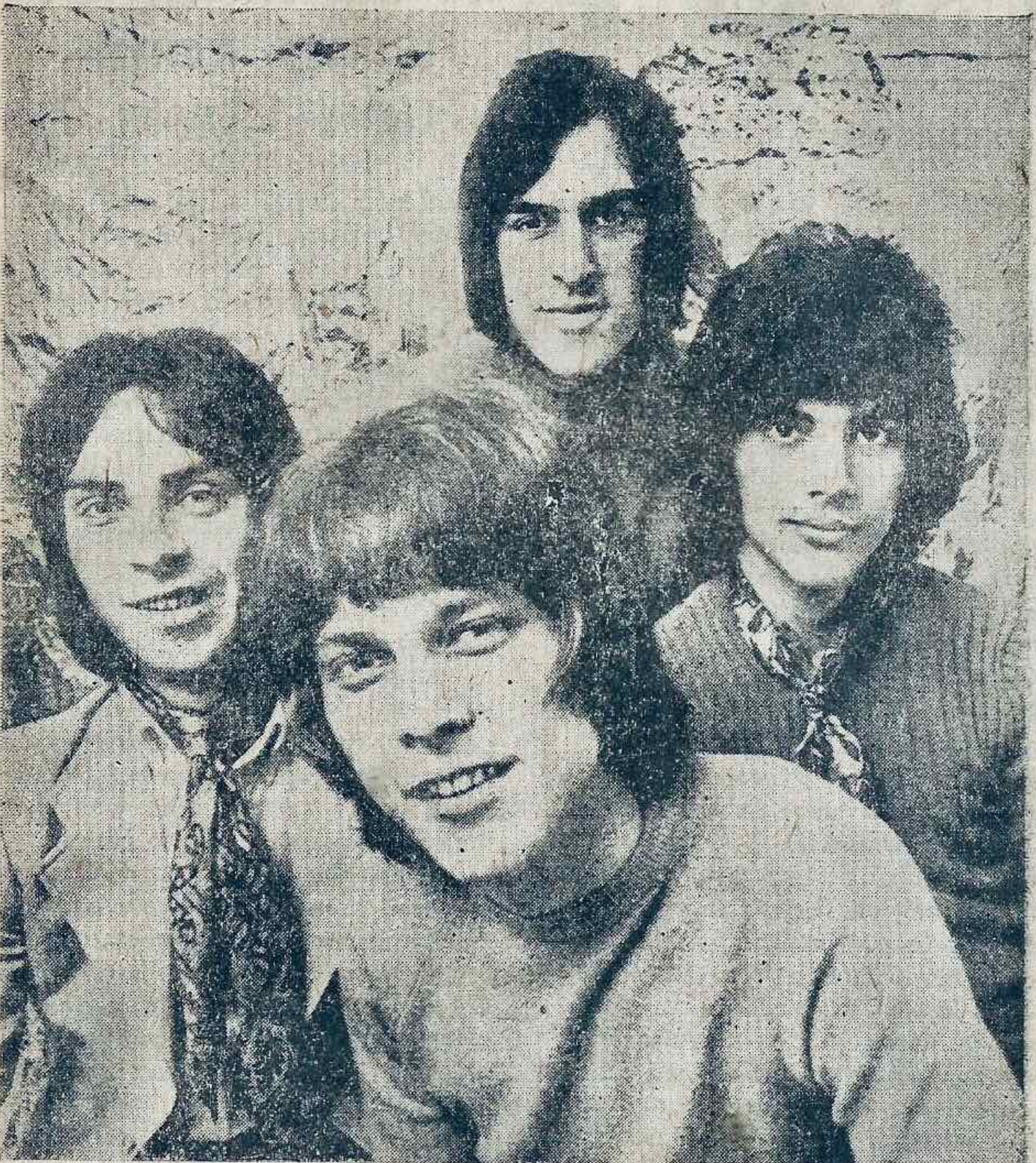
- Edison Lighthouse in 1970

Background information
- Also known as: Greenfield Hammer
- Origin: London, England
- Genres: Pop; bubblegum pop; soft rock
- Years active: 1969–1972, 1974–present
- Labels: Bell; RRO Entertainment
- Members: Brian Huggins; Peter Butt; Mark Forton; Matthew Bason; Alan Warner
- Past members: Tony Burrows; Stuart Edwards; David Taylor; George Weyman; Ray Dorey; Paul Vigrass; David Kerr-Clemenson; Andy Locke; Eddie Richards; Wally Scott; Russell Powell; Ken Reeves; Eamonn Carr; Mike Prophet; Peter Gutteridge; Rob Wilson; John Lee; Rick Piggott; Derek Boston; Rick Foster; Dave Shackle
- Website: edison-lighthouse.com

Edison Lighthouse are an English pop band, formed in London in 1969. The band was best known for their 1970 hit single "Love Grows (Where My Rosemary Goes)" recorded in late 1969.

== Career ==
Before the name Edison Lighthouse, they were known as the soft rock band Greenfield Hammer, gigging on the home counties circuit. The original line-up of Edison Lighthouse consisted of Tony Burrows (lead vocalist), Stuart Edwards (lead guitar), David Taylor (bass guitar), George Weyman (drums), and Ray Dorey (guitar).

"Love Grows (Where My Rosemary Goes)" was No. 1 for five weeks and sold 250,000 copies in the UK. It reached the top of the chart in its second week. The United States release was in February 1970 and reached No. 5 on the Billboard Hot 100, selling a million copies there by April and earning an RIAA gold disc. In Canada, the song reached No. 3.

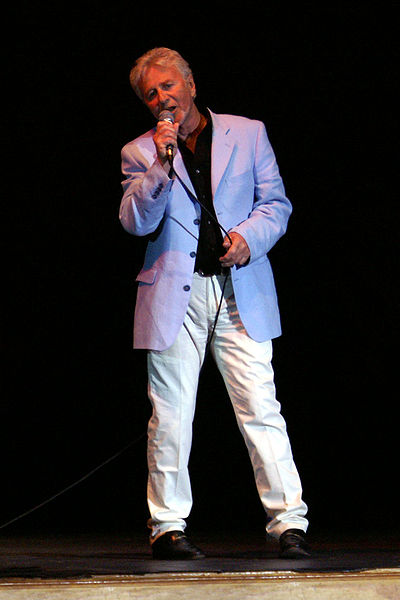
Tony Burrows in concert, 17 May 2008

After recording the second single "She Works In a Woman's Way" which failed to chart in either the UK or the US, Tony Burrows left Edison Lighthouse. Tony Macaulay (who owned the rights to the name Edison Lighthouse) brought in other musicians. Actor and singer Paul Vigrass replaced Burrows. Other members included David Kerr-Clemenson (bass guitar) of Warehorne, Andy Locke (vocals, guitar), Eddie Richards (drums), Wally Scott (guitar) and Ken Reeves (vocals).

The band's song "It's Up to You Petula" reached the UK top 50. Their next single, "What's Happening?" coupled with "Take a Little Time", was written by the band. They then went on to tour Australia, New Zealand, Singapore, Malaysia and Africa. The single released for the Africa tour was "Reconsider My Belinda". The last single released was "Find Mr. Zebedee". The band then ceased activity after returning from a tour of Europe.

=== Continuation of Edison Lighthouse ===
In 1973 Brian Huggins and Peter Butt, of the band Crush, were approached by their management to take over touring Scandinavia as Edison Lighthouse. Brian Huggins acquired the rights to the name Edison Lighthouse in 1974. Huggins has been fronting the band ever since.

On 17 January 2024, the band released a cover of "Fun, Fun, Fun", which debut at No. 32 on the "Heritage Chart" on 21 January. On 20 January 2024, Alan Warner of the Foundations joined on guitar.

== Origin of the name ==
Edison Lighthouse was named after the Eddystone Lighthouse off the coast of Devon. The band later briefly dropped the Lighthouse and became just Edison, although the original name was later reinstated.

== Members ==
Current

- Brian Huggins − lead vocals (1973–present)
- Peter Butt − guitar/bass guitar (1973–present)
- Mark Forton − drums (2021–present)
- Matthew Bason – keyboards/pedal bass (2022–present)
- Alan Warner – guitar (2024–present)

Former

- Tony Burrows − lead vocals (1969–1970)
- Stuart Edwards − guitar (1969–1970)
- Ray Dorey − guitar (1969–1970)
- David Taylor − bass guitar (1969–1970)
- George Weyman − drums (1969–1970)
- Paul Vigrass − lead vocals (1970–1973)
- Andy Locke − guitar (1970–1973)
- Wally Scott − guitar (1970–1973)
- David Kerr-Clemenson − bass guitar (1970–1973)
- Eddie Richards − drums (1970–1973)
- Rob Wilson − bass guitar (1973–unknown)
- Stephane Booroff – drums (2013–2021)

Dave Kerr-Clemenson, after touring with White Plains and Andy Locke, went on to form Fast Buck, recorded an album with Jet Records, and toured the world extensively supporting ELO. Eddie Richards was the drummer in The First Class who had a hit with "Beach Baby". Guitarist Stuart Edwards died on 26 October 2016 from cancer at the age of 73.

The group's top 40 hit "Love Grows (Where My Rosemary Goes)" (1970) was one of four near-concurrent UK Singles Chart top ten hit singles that Burrows was involved with different groups. The other songs were "Gimme Dat Ding" (the Pipkins), "My Baby Loves Lovin'" (White Plains), and "United We Stand" (Brotherhood of Man). Burrows was also lead vocalist on the single "Beach Baby" (1974) for another studio-only group, the First Class.

== Discography ==
=== Studio albums ===
- Already (1971, Bell Records, Sweden)
- Love Grows (1977, SMA, UK)

=== Live albums ===
- Then There Where Two (2003, self-release, UK)

=== Compilation albums ===
- Love Grows (CD, ACD, Austria)
- Edison Lighthouse (1990 Cassette/CD, Object Enterprises, UK)
- Love Grows: Complete Collection Featuring Tony Burrows (1994 CD, Sunflower, Italy)
- The Best of Edison Lighthouse - Love Grows (1999 CD, Repertoire Records, Germany)
- Love Grows with Edison Lighthouse (2002 CD, The Westminster Recording Co., UK)
- On the Rocks (2002 CD, Park South, US)
- Edison Lighthouse Selected Favorites (2006 Digital Download, Charly Records, US)
- Their Very Best (2009 Digital Download, K-tel, US)
- Barbara Ann (2010 Digital Download, One Media Publishing, US)
- Showing the Way (The Dave Cash Collection) (2011 Digital Download, One Media Publishing, US)
- The Dave Cash Collection: Light My House (2011 Digital Download, One Media Publishing, US)

=== Singles ===
| Year | Title | Peak chart positions | | | | | | | | | Certifications |
| Year | Title | UK | AUS | CAN | IRE | NLD | NOR | NZ | US | US A/C | Certifications |
|---|---|---|---|---|---|---|---|---|---|---|---|
| 1970 | "Love Grows (Where My Rosemary Goes)" | 1 | 2 | 3 | 1 | 13 | 7 | 1 | 5 | 20 | BPI: Gold |
| 1970 | "She Works in a Woman's Way" | ― | ― | ― | ― | ― | ― | 3 | ― | ― | |
| 1971 | "It's Up to You, Petula" | 49 | 68 | 71 | ― | ― | ― | 18 | 72 | ― | |
| 1971 | "Everybody Knows" | ― | ― | ― | ― | ― | ― | ― | ― | ― | |
| 1971 | "What's Happening" | ― | ― | ― | ― | ― | ― | ― | ― | ― | |
| 1971 | "My Baby Loves Lovin'" | ― | ― | ― | ― | ― | ― | ― | ― | ― | |
| 1972 | "Find Mr. Zebedee" | ― | ― | ― | ― | ― | ― | ― | ― | ― | |
| 1981 | "Endearing Young Charms" | ― | ― | ― | ― | ― | ― | ― | ― | ― | |
"—" denotes releases that did not chart or were not released in that territory.

== See also ==
- List of artists who reached number one on the UK Singles Chart
- List of UK Singles Chart number ones of the 1970s
- List of performers on Top of the Pops
- List of one-hit wonders in the United States
- List of 1970s one-hit wonders in the United States
- List of number-one singles of 1970 (Ireland)
- List of Top 25 singles for 1970 in Australia
