= Love Grows (Where My Rosemary Goes) =

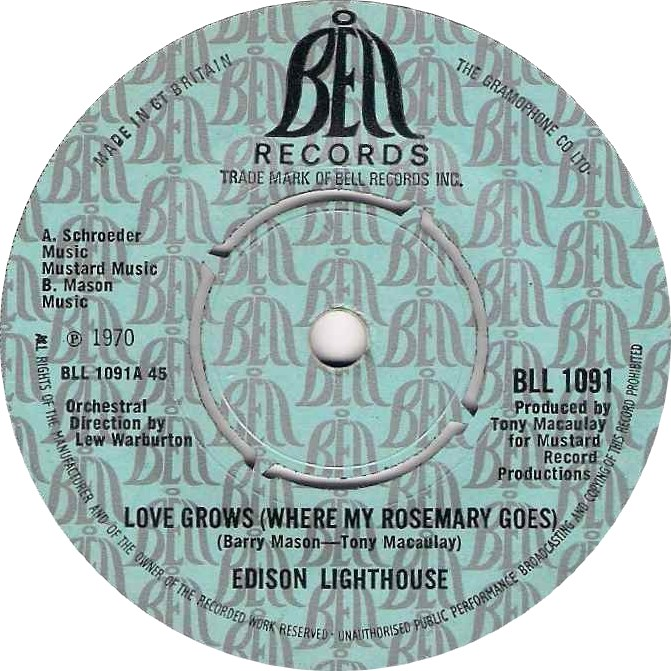
- Side A of the original UK single

Single by Edison Lighthouse

from the album Already
- B-side: "Every Lonely Day"
- Released: 9 January 1970
- Recorded: November 1969
- Studio: Wessex Sound, London
- Genre: Soft rock; pop rock; bubblegum
- Length: 2:51
- Label: Bell
- Songwriters: Tony Macaulay and Barry Mason
- Producer: Tony Macaulay

Edison Lighthouse singles chronology
"Love Grows (Where My Rosemary Goes)" (1970)	"She Works in a Woman's Way" (1970)

Alternative cover
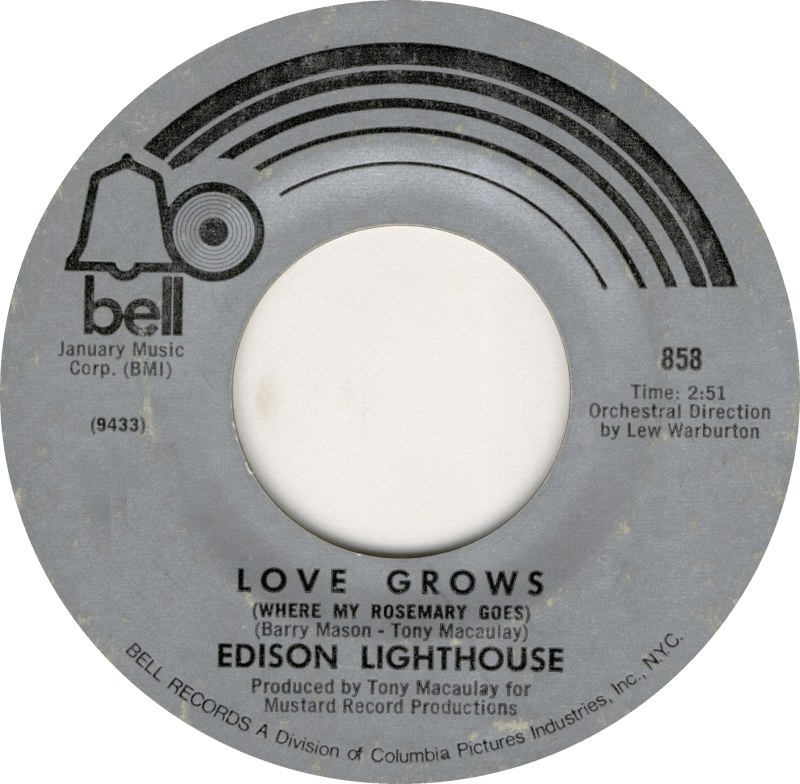
- Side A of the US single

Music video
- "Love Grows (Where My Rosemary Goes)" on YouTube

"Love Grows (Where My Rosemary Goes)" is the debut single by Edison Lighthouse, first released on 9 January 1970 in the UK and in February in the US. The song reached the No. 1 spot on the UK Singles Chart on the week ending 31 January 1970, where it remained for a total of five weeks. It also became the first No. 1 single of the 1970s (not counting Rolf Harris's "Two Little Boys" which was a holdover from 1969).

== Background ==
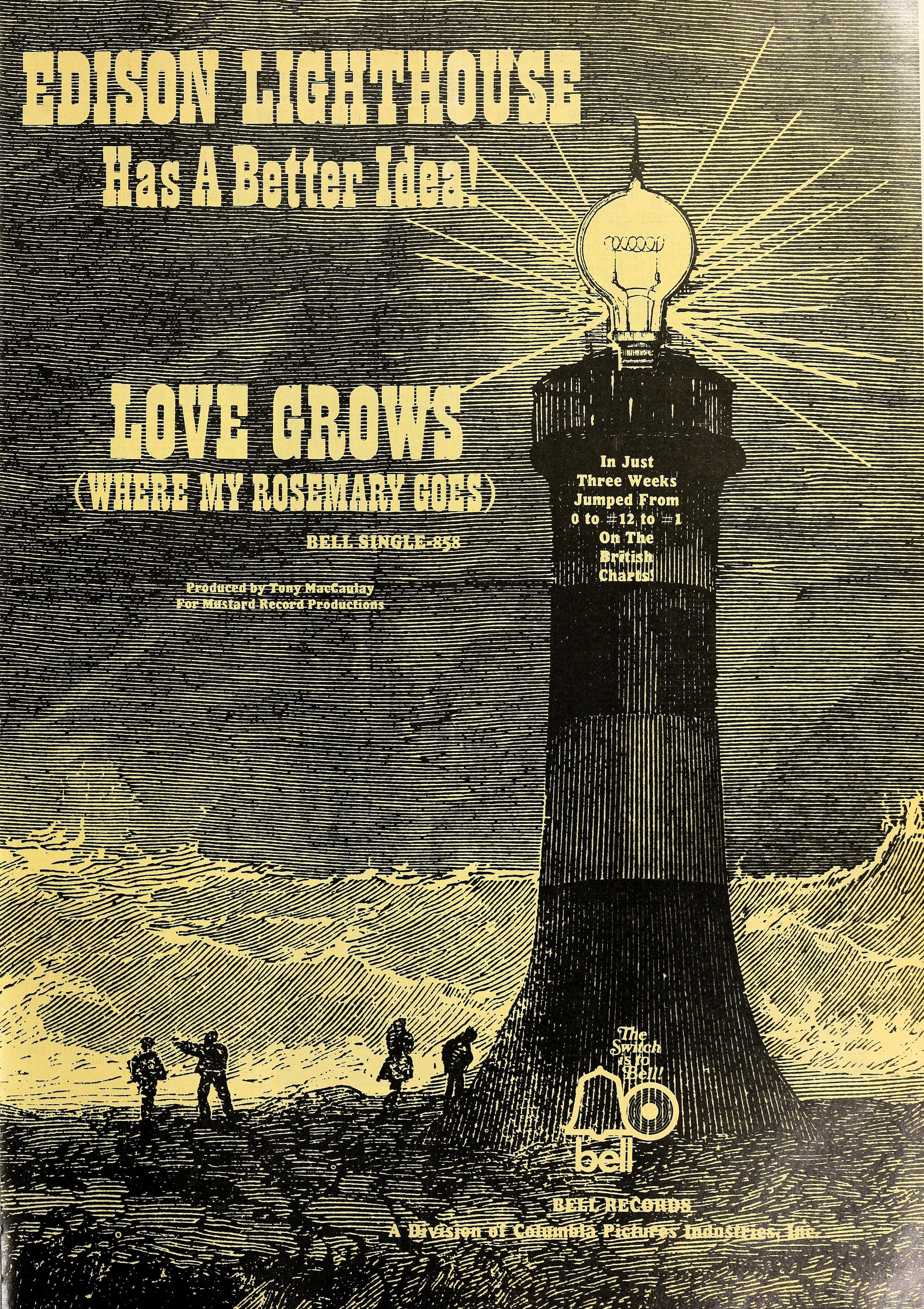
Cashbox advertisement for the US release, 7 February 1970

"Love Grows (Where My Rosemary Goes)" was written by Tony Macaulay and Barry Mason and was first recorded by Geoff Turton as "Jefferson" but not released until years later. Tony Burrows recorded it next, with session musicians. The track entered the UK top 40 at No. 12 on 24 January 1970.

A week later, the song had climbed eleven places to No. 1, becoming the first new UK chart-topper of the 1970s. After a five-week stay at the top, it dropped to No. 4, replaced by "Wand'rin' Star" by Lee Marvin. Whilst at No. 1, Edison Lighthouse held off strong competition from Peter, Paul and Mary ("Leaving on a Jet Plane") and Canned Heat ("Let's Work Together"). After a 12-week run, "Love Grows" left the UK top 40 on 18 April 1970.

Tony Burrows initially tried to get the single released under his own name but was turned down by the song's writer and producer Tony Macaulay. When "Love Grows (Where My Rosemary Goes)" became a hit, a group needed to be assembled rapidly to perform the song on Top of the Pops. The pair found a group called Greenfield Hammer, who appeared on Top of the Pops a week later as "Edison Lighthouse" to mime the song.

Burrows sang the song on the programme on four separate weeks in January and February 1970 and he also appeared performing for Brotherhood of Man ("United We Stand") and White Plains ("My Baby Loves Lovin'"), who also had hits during that same month-long stretch.

In the U.S., the Edison Lighthouse version of "Love Grows (Where My Rosemary Goes)" came close to facing competition from a cover version that ABC-Dunhill Records wanted to cut with well-established top 40 hitmakers The Grass Roots. However, the latter group passed on the song, reportedly because Grass Roots frontman Rob Grill balked at singing a love song that might be thought to refer to co-member Warren Entner's wife Rosemarie Frankland. Issued in the U.S. in February 1970, "Love Grows" by Edison Lighthouse entered the top 40 of the Billboard Hot 100 dated 28 February 1970 at No. 68, to reach a peak position of No. 5 on 28 March, remaining there for two weeks. After a 12-week run, the song exited the US top 40 on 23 May.

"Love Grows" reached No. 3 on the Canadian RPM Top Singles chart and No. 3 in South Africa in February 1970.

Toward the end of 2021, the song saw a massive resurgence due to its popularity on TikTok. Between 25 December 2021 and 3 January 2022, there was a growth of 1,490% in its on-demand audio streams, and it moved into Spotify's U.S. Top 200 Chart.

The song was used by the BBC in the trailer for series 15, set in 1971, of Call The Midwife in 2025-26.

== Charts ==
=== Weekly charts ===
Chart (1970)	Peak position
Australia (Go-Set)	2
Belgium (Flanders)	17
Belgium (Wallonia)	48
Canada RPM Top Singles	3
Canada RPM Adult Contemporary	24
Finland (Suomen virallinen lista)	36
Germany	8
Ireland (IRMA)	1
Netherlands (Dutch Top 40)	13
New Zealand (Listener)	1
Norway	7
South Africa (Springbok)	3
UK Singles (Official Charts)	1
US Billboard Hot 100	5
US Billboard Easy Listening	20
US Cash Box Top 100	4

Chart (2022)	Peak position
Global 200 (Billboard)	147
Sweden Heatseeker (Sverigetopplistan)	2
UK Audio Streaming (Official Charts)	77

=== Year-end charts ===
Chart (1970)	Rank
Australia (KMR)	12
Australia (Go-Set)	27
Canada	53
UK	11
US Billboard Hot 100	40
US Cash Box	33

== Certifications ==
Region	Certification	Certified units/sales
New Zealand (RMNZ)	Platinum	30,000^{‡}
United Kingdom (BPI) Digital sales since 2007	Gold	400,000^{‡}
United States (RIAA)	Gold	1,000,000^{^}
^{^} Shipments figures based on certification alone.^{‡} Sales+streaming figures based on certification alone.

== See also ==
- List of 1970s one-hit wonders in the United States
