= Brotherhood of Man discography =

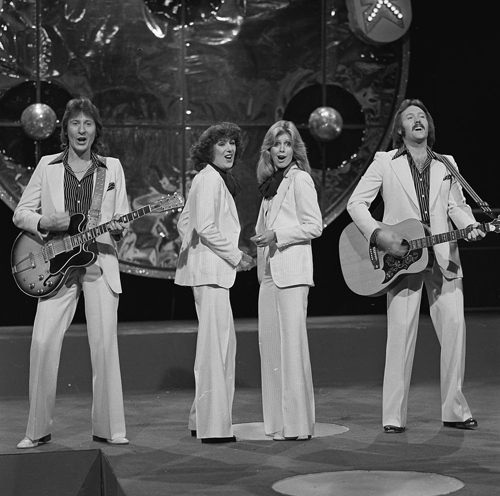
- Brotherhood of Man in 1977
- Studio albums: 16
- Compilation albums: 2
- Singles: 31
- B-sides: 12

This is a discography of the singles and albums of British pop group Brotherhood of Man.

All singles and albums from 1974 are from a completely different line-up to the earlier releases. The earlier releases (on the Deram label) were credited to The Brotherhood of Man.

The group's first appearance on the chart was on 14 February 1970 in the UK with the single "United We Stand". This went on to become a hit in many other countries, including the US.

The first chart appearance of the later line-up is with the 1974 single "Lady" in Belgium and Holland. The first appearance by this line-up in the UK is with the single "Save Your Kisses For Me" on 13 March 1976. The song's entry at No.14 was the second highest Top 50 chart entry of that year (second to Queen's "Somebody to Love", which rose from 51 to 4 in a single week), due to its selection as the UK entry for the Eurovision Song Contest 1976.

The first appearance on the UK album charts is with Love and Kisses on 24 April 1976.

Their final single chart appearance anywhere in the world was in the UK with the single "Lightning Flash" on 10 July 1982. The 3CD set Gold, released by Demon music, saw the group return to the UK album chart at No 29. Their final appearance was 30 May 2019.

Altogether they spent 98 weeks in the UK singles chart (including eight weeks at No.1) and 42 weeks in the album chart.

== Albums ==
=== Studio albums ===
Title	Album details	Peak chart positions					Certifications
Title	Album details	UK	AUS	NZ	NOR	SWE	Certifications
United We Stand	Released: August 1970; Label: Deram; Formats: Vinyl, 8-track, CS, CD	—	—	—	—	—	
We're the Brotherhood of Man	Released: 21 April 1972; Label: Deram; Formats: Vinyl, 8-track, CS	—	—	—	—	—	
Good Things Happening	Released: September 1974; Label: Dawn; Formats: Vinyl, 8-track, CS, CD	—	—	—	—	—	
Love and Kisses from Brotherhood of Man	Released: 2 April 1976; Label: Pye; Formats: Vinyl, 8-track, CS, CD	20	96	—	6	24	UK: Silver
Oh Boy! / Midnight Express	Released: March 1977; Label: Pye; Formats: Vinyl, 8-track, CS, CD	—	—	—	—	—	
Images	Released: October 1977; Label: Pye; Formats: Vinyl, 8-track, CS, CD	—	—	—	—	—	
B for Brotherhood	Released: 7 June 1978; Label: Pye; Formats: Vinyl, 8-track, CS	18	—	—	—	—	UK: Silver
Higher Than High	Released: June 1979; Label: Pye; Formats: Vinyl, 8-track, CS	—	—	—	—	—	
Singing a Song	Released: December 1979; Label: Pye; Formats: Vinyl, 8-track, CS	—	—	—	—	—	
Good Fortune	Released: 1980; Label: RCA; Formats: Vinyl, CS	—	—	—	—	—	
Sing 20 Number One Hits	Released: 1 November 1980; Label: Warwick; Formats: Vinyl, CS, CD	14	—	29	—	—	UK: Gold
20 Disco Greats / 20 Love Songs	Released: November 1981; Label: Warwick; Formats: Vinyl, CS	—	—	—	—	—	
Lightning Flash	Released: July 1983; Label: EMI; Formats: Vinyl, CS	—	—	—	—	—	
The Butterfly Children	Released: September 1992; Label: Independent release; Formats: CS	—	—	—	—	—	
Greenhouse	Released: October 1997; Label: Independent release; Formats: CS	—	—	—	—	—	
The Seventies Story	Released: November 2002; Label: Independent release; Formats: CD	—	—	—	—	—	
"—" denotes items that did not chart or were not released in that territory.

=== Compilation albums ===
Title	Album details	Peak chart positions		
Title	Album details	UK	UK Sales	SCOT
The World of the Brotherhood of Man	Released: June 1973; Label: Decca; Formats: Vinyl, 8-track, CS	—	—	—
Twenty Greatest	Released: September 1978; Label: Pye/K-tel; Formats: Vinyl, 8-track, CS	6	—	—
Gold	Released: 10 May 2019; Label: Demon; Formats: CD, download	29	8	10
"—" denotes items that did not chart or were not released in that territory.

== Singles ==
Year	Title	Peak chart positions										Certifications	Album
Year	Title	UK	AUS	BEL	CAN	GER	IRE	NED	NZ	NOR	US	Certifications	Album
1969	"Love One Another"	—	—	—	—	—	—	—	—	—	—		United We Stand
1970	"United We Stand"	10	8	—	9	—	16	—	—	—	13		United We Stand
1970	"Where are You Going to My Love"	22	—	—	40	—	—	—	—	—	61		United We Stand
1970	"This Boy"	—	—	—	—	—	—	—	—	—	—		Non-album single
1971	"Reach Out Your Hand"	—	—	—	83	—	—	—	—	—	77		We're the Brotherhood of Man
1971	"You and I"	—	—	—	—	—	—	—	—	—	—		We're the Brotherhood of Man
1971	"California Sunday Morning"	54 (Note: Chart position is from the official UK "Breakers List".)	—	—	—	—	—	—	—	—	—		The World of the Brotherhood of Man
1972	"Follow Me"/"Say a Prayer"	—	—	—	—	—	—	—	—	—	—		The World of the Brotherhood of Man
1973	"Happy Ever After"	—	—	—	—	—	—	—	—	—	—		Non-album singles
1973	"Our World of Love"	—	—	—	—	—	—	—	—	—	—		Non-album singles
1974	"When Love Catches Up on You"	—	—	—	—	—	—	—	—	—	—		Good Things Happening
1974	"Lady"	—	—	18	—	—	—	14	—	—	—		Good Things Happening
1974	"Lady Lady Lay"	—	—	—	—	—	—	—	—	—	—		Good Things Happening
1975	"Spring of 1912"	—	—	—	—	—	—	—	—	—	—		Good Things Happening
1975	"Kiss Me Kiss Your Baby"	—	92	1	—	26	—	2	26	—	—	FRA: Gold	Love and Kisses from Brotherhood of Man
1976	"Save Your Kisses for Me"	1	5	1	61	2	1	1	9	1	27	UK: Platinum; FRA: Gold	Love and Kisses from Brotherhood of Man
1976	"My Sweet Rosalie"	30	—	2	—	31	—	5	—	—	—		Oh Boy! / Midnight Express
1977	"Oh Boy"	8	—	8	—	—	6	5	—	—	—		Oh Boy! / Midnight Express
1977	"Angelo"	1	23	3	—	14	1	5	27	—	—	UK: Gold	Images
1977	"Highwayman"	60	—	22	—	—	—	15	—	—	—		Images
1978	"Figaro"	1	—	19	—	—	1	30	—	12	—	UK: Gold	B for Brotherhood
1978	"Beautiful Lover"	15	90	30	—	—	6	50	—	—	—		B for Brotherhood
1978	"Middle of the Night"	41	—	—	—	—	—	—	—	—	—		Higher Than High
1979	"Goodbye Goodbye"	—	—	—	—	—	—	—	—	—	—		Higher Than High
1979	"Papa Louis"	—	—	—	—	—	—	—	—	—	—		Higher Than High
1979	"Taxi"	—	—	—	—	—	—	—	—	—	—		Higher Than High
1980	"Honey Don't Throw Our Love Away"	—	—	—	—	—	—	—	—	—	—		Good Fortune
1980	"Will You Love Me Tomorrow"	—	—	—	—	—	—	—	—	—	—		Good Fortune
1982	"Lightning Flash"	67	—	—	—	—	—	—	—	—	—		Lightning Flash
1982	"Cry Baby Cry"	—	—	—	—	—	—	—	—	—	—		Lightning Flash
1983	"When the Kissing Stops"	—	—	—	—	—	—	—	—	—	—		Lightning Flash
"—" denotes items that did not chart or were not released in that territory.

== Notes ==
- The final three albums as listed above were not officially released, but independently produced by the group themselves, therefore ineligible for chart entry.
- A single, "Rock Me Baby" was intended for release in late 1972 by the new Brotherhood of Man line-up, but was cancelled, due to its release as a single by David Cassidy.
- In addition to the singles, track "Tell Me Tell Me Tell Me" charted at No.42 in France, and No.27 in Belgium.
- Other singles not released in the UK are: "Be My Loving Baby (Belgium, 1975), "Sweet Lady from Georgia" (US, 1976), "I Give You My Love" (Europe-various, 1976), "Singing a Song" (Spain, 1980), "Sugar Mouse" (Holland, 1980), "One Day at a Time" (South Africa, 1981), "Tus Besos Son Para Mi"/"Tu Eres Bonita" (Spain, 1991).
- The first album, United We Stand was re-released on CD in 2008. The first four albums of the later line up (Good Things Happening to Images) were released on CD in May 2009.
- A DVD of the group, Greatest Hits was released by BR Music in June 2004. This featured TV appearances of the group performing many of their hit singles as well as Eurovision footage.

== B-sides ==
The following is a list of songs featured on B-sides, which were not included on any album

Year	Song	Notes	From single
1973	"We Can Make It"		"Happy Ever After"
1973	"Maybe the Morning"	Alternate recording to the album version	"Our World of Love"
1974	"Love's Bound to Get Ya"		"When Love Catches Up on You"
1974	"How Can You Love"		"Lady"
1975	"Put Out the Fire"		"Spring of 1912"
1976	"Let's Love Together"	Only song to be co-written by member Sandra Stevens	"Save Your Kisses for Me"
1976	"Sugar Honey Love"		"My Sweet Rosalie"
1977	"Closer Closer"		"Oh Boy (The Mood I'm In)"
1979	"Better to Have Loved"		"Goodbye Goodbye"
1979	"For You"		"Papa Louis"
1979	"Hi Ho (Together We Go)"	Two versions of this song were released	"Taxi"
1980	"Catch Me Catch Me if You Can"		"Will You Love Me Tomorrow"
