= Twenty Greatest =

Greatest hits album by Brotherhood of Man
- Released: September 1978
- Recorded: 1974–1978
- Genre: Pop, MOR, soul
- Length: 64.31
- Label: Pye / K-tel
- Producer: Tony Hiller

Brotherhood of Man chronology
B for Brotherhood (1978)	Twenty Greatest (1978)	Higher Than High (1979)

Singles from Twenty Greatest
- 1. "Middle of the Night" Released: September 1978

Professional ratings
Review scores
Source	Rating
Allmusic	3/5 stars

Twenty Greatest is the sixth album released by British pop group Brotherhood of Man and their first compilation. It was released in 1978 and became their biggest selling album, peaking at No.6 in the UK and being certified gold. As the title suggests, it is a collection of twenty songs, including their three number one hits, "Save Your Kisses for Me", "Angelo" and "Figaro" alongside their current single release, "Middle of the Night".

== Background ==
This album was a Greatest Hits compilation featuring all their hit singles up to this point as well as selected album tracks and new recordings. The album was released on K-Tel records (in association with their regular label Pye) in late September 1978 and reached No.6 in the UK album charts. It remained on the charts for 15 weeks and was certified gold by the BPI, becoming the most successful album of their career. The album was listed as 'album of the week' on BBC Radio 2 during October.

The singles included are: "Lady", "Lady Lady Lay", "Kiss Me Kiss Your Baby", "Save Your Kisses for Me", "My Sweet Rosalie", "Oh Boy (The Mood I'm In)", "Angelo", "Highwayman", "Figaro", "Beautiful Lover" and "Middle of the Night". The early hits "United We Stand" and "Where are You Going to My Love" by the previous incarnation of the group, are included here as new recordings by this version of Brotherhood Of Man. Two other new recordings for this album are cover versions of "How Deep Is Your Love" and "Send in the Clowns", which is largely an a cappella piece, with piano accompaniment by member Nicky Stevens. Magazine Record Mirror called current single "Middle of the Night" "positively dreadful". Music Week said it was a "rock orientated disc".

This album is sometimes referred to simply as Brotherhood of Man - as this was the name (erroneously) accredited to it in the UK Chart listings. Early pressings of the album gave the group's name as 'The Brotherhood of Man' (a name they hadn't been known as since the first incarnation of the group in the early 1970s) (see illustration), but later pressings had rectified this to simply 'Brotherhood of Man'.

The Soviet record company Melodiya released this album in 1981 as a 12-track collection: Side A: "Save Your Kisses for Me", "Angelo", "Oh Boy (The Mood I'm In)", "My Sweet Rosalie", "Kiss Me Kiss Your Baby", "Beautiful Lover"; Side B: "Middle of the Night", "Figaro", "Highwayman", "He Ain't Heavy, He's My Brother", "Lady Lady Lady Lay", "United We Stand". This compilation was very popular in the USSR and sold 500,000 copies.

== Track listing ==
Side One

No.	Title	Writer(s)	Original album	Length
1.	"Save Your Kisses for Me"	Tony Hiller; Lee Sheriden; Martin Lee	Love and Kisses (1976)	3:05
2.	"Angelo"	Hiller; Sheriden; Lee	Images (1977)	3:16
3.	"Oh Boy (The Mood I'm In)"	Tony Romeo	Oh Boy! (1977)	3:18
4.	"Where are You Going to My Love"	Hiller; John Goodison; Billy Day; Mike Lesley	Previously unreleased	3:24
5.	"Images"	Hiller; Sheriden; Lee	Images	2:25
6.	"Send in the Clowns"	Stephen Sondheim	Previously unreleased	3:52
7.	"In Love"	Hiller; Sheriden; Lee	B for Brotherhood (1978)	3:50
8.	"My Sweet Rosalie"	Hiller; Sheriden; Lee	Oh Boy!	2:36
9.	"Kiss Me Kiss Your Baby"	Barry Blue	Love and Kisses	3:05
10.	"Beautiful Lover"	Hiller; Sheriden; Lee	B for Brotherhood	3:27
Total length:				32:18

Side Two

No.	Title	Writer(s)	Original album	Length
11.	"Middle of the Night"	Hiller; Sheriden; Lee	Previously unreleased	3:07
12.	"Figaro"	Hiller; Sheriden; Lee	B for Brotherhood	2:57
13.	"Highwayman"	Hiller; Sheriden; Lee	Images	2:35
14.	"People Over the World"	Hiller; Sheriden; Lee	B for Brotherhood	2:58
15.	"He Ain't Heavy, He's My Brother"	Bob Russell; Bobby Scott	Good Things Happening (1974)	4:22
16.	"To-night's the Night"	Hiller; Sheriden; Lee	Images	2:46
17.	"Lady Lady Lady Lay"	Hiller; Michel Jourdan; Pierre Groscolas	Good Things Happening	2:58
18.	"How Deep Is Your Love"	Barry Gibb; Maurice Gibb; Robin Gibb	Previously unreleased	4:08
19.	"Lady"	Hiller; Sheriden; Lee	Good Things Happening	3:25
20.	"United We Stand"	Hiller; Peter Simons	Previously unreleased	2:57
Total length:				32:13

== Personnel ==
- Martin Lee - vocals
- Lee Sheriden - vocals
- Nicky Stevens - vocals, piano on "Send in the Clowns"
- Sandra Stevens - vocals
- Tony Hiller - producer
- Lee Sheriden - arranger (tracks 1,2,3,5,7,8,10,11,12,13,16,18)
- Colin Frechter - arranger (tracks 6,14,15,17,19)
- Cy Payne - arranger (tracks 4,20)
- Graham Prescott - arranger (track 9)
- John Constable Design Company - Sleeve design

== Chart performance ==
Release date	Single title	UK Chart position
September 1978	"Middle of the Night"	41
Release date	Album title	UK Chart position
September 1978	Twenty Greatest	6
