= Greenhouse (Brotherhood of Man album) =

Studio album by Brotherhood of Man
- Released: October 1997
- Recorded: 1991, 1997
- Genre: Pop, rock
- Length: 43.05
- Producer: Brotherhood of Man, Eddy Ouwens

Brotherhood of Man chronology
The Butterfly Children (1992)	Greenhouse (1997)	The Seventies Story (2002)

Greenhouse is a 1997 album by British pop group Brotherhood of Man.

The album was released independently by the group themselves on cassette only and was available to buy at their shows. The songs contained included a mix of re-recordings of their own hit singles and cover versions. It also contained one new track "Greenhouse" - a song recorded a few years earlier in 1991 with Dutch producer Eddy Ouwens, but never released. The song was later included on the download-only album The Definitive Collection in 2009. Brotherhood of Man themselves were credited as producers for the rest of the album (member Lee Sheriden had been the group's musical director on their recordings for many years). The line-up of tracks formed part of their then current live show.

Among the cover versions were the Prince song, "1999", the Beatles' "Got to Get You into My Life" (albeit based on the 1970s hit version by Earth Wind and Fire), Huey Lewis and the News 1987 hit "Hip to Be Square" and Foreigner's "Juke Box Hero". The latter of these featured a heavy rock sound that was unusual for Brotherhood of Man, and at over five minutes; the longest song they ever recorded.

== Track listing ==
Side One

1. "1999" (Nelson) 4.02
2. "Beautiful Lover" (Hiller / Sheriden / Lee) 3.26
3. "Angelo" (Hiller / Sheriden / Lee) 3.09
4. "Hip to Be Square" (Gibson, Hopper, Lewis) 4.06
5. "Got to Get You into My Life" (Lennon–McCartney) 4.10
6. "Figaro" (Hiller / Sheriden / Lee) 2.58

Side Two

1. "Greenhouse" (Hiller / Blue) 4.08
2. "Sweet Rosalie" (Hiller / Sheriden / Lee) 2.36
3. "Oh Boy (The Mood I'm In)" (Romeo) 3.19
4. "Juke Box Hero" (Gramm / Jones) 5.10
5. "Save Your Kisses for Me" (Hiller / Sheriden / Lee) 3.04
6. "United We Stand" (Hiller / Simmons) 2.57
