= Images (Brotherhood of Man album) =

Studio album by Brotherhood of Man
- Released: October 1977
- Genre: Pop, MOR
- Length: 34:33
- Label: Pye
- Producer: Tony Hiller

Brotherhood of Man chronology
Oh Boy! (1977)	Images (1977)	B for Brotherhood (1978)

Singles from Images
- 1. "Angelo" Released: 17 June 1977; 2. "Highwayman" Released: 14 October 1977

Images is the fourth album by pop group Brotherhood of Man. It was released in 1977 and featured the No.1 hit, "Angelo".

== Background ==
This was the group's second album release in 1977 (although the previous album had been recorded in 1976) and was led by the single, "Angelo". The single was released in June 1977 and became one of the group's biggest hits, reaching No.1 in the UK and spending 10 weeks in the top 10.

The album was released on Pye Records in late October 1977 and also featured the follow-up single, "Highwayman". The second single failed to enter the UK charts, but did feature on the "breakers" section for two weeks in November 1977. In this month, the group appeared on TV's Royal Variety Performance before the Queen, but rather than promote their latest single, they elected to perform "Angelo". "Highwayman" fared better however in the Netherlands and Belgium where it reached #15 and #18 respectively. Unlike previous albums where different songs were released in different countries, these were the only two singles released from this album anywhere. Images failed to chart in the UK despite its release being surrounded by No.1 singles "Angelo" and "Figaro". In some European countries, another song "Circus" had been featured as the B-side to "Angelo" and was included on the album, replacing "The Night of My Life". The B-side to "Highwayman", "Star" (also included on the album), was retitled in some territories as "Superstar". As well as the two singles from this album, three songs; "All Night", "Star" and "You Can Say That Again" were issued as B-sides.

This album saw the group adopt a more pop and in particular, ABBA-like sound, which was often commented on in the media at the time. Contemporary reviews of the album drew on the comparison, with Brotherhood of Man usually being seen as inferior. Journalist Chris White made mention that while "Angelo" had similarities to the Swedish group, follow-up "Highwayman" was quite different. Magazine Music Week said that it had "catchy, tuneful songs" but the tracks suffered from a "sameness". It said the album was "not outstanding [but] bounces along in a fairly jolly way". It listed tracks "Tonight's the Night" and "Highwayman" as being the best on the album. Record Mirror said that "Highwayman" was similar to their other singles and labelled it a "nice nothing". Unlike previous albums, all lead vocals were handled by female members Sandra Stevens and Nicky Stevens. This was a definite shift away from the more soul-like productions of earlier albums such as Love and Kisses. The album, like the others was produced by manager and co-songwriter, Tony Hiller. All twelve tracks were written by group members Martin Lee and Lee Sheriden alongside Hiller. The subject matter for some of the songs was curious in that it features three songs about female infidelity ("Safety First", "Highwayman" and "The Night of My Life"), while two feature stories of elopement ("Angelo" and "Tonight's the Night").

The front cover image was taken by Royal photographer Patrick Lichfield.

Images was released on Compact disc for the first time in a double-pack with Oh Boy! in May 2009 by Cherry Red Records.

== Track listing ==
All tracks written by Hiller / Sheriden / Lee

Side One

1. "Angelo" – 3:15
2. "Images" – 2:30
3. "Safety First" – 2:53
4. "Two Can Live as Cheap Babe" – 2:27
5. "You Can Say That Again" – 3:30
6. "Lullaby" – 2:42

Side Two

1. "Highwayman" – 2:35
2. "Star" – 2:30
3. "All Night" – 2:59
4. "Sparky" – 2:58
5. "To-night's the Night" – 2:46
6. "The Night of My Life" – 3:28

CD bonus track

1. "Circus" – 3:20

== Personnel ==
- Tony Hiller– Producer
- Martin Lee– Lead vocals on "Circus"
- Lee Sheriden– Musical Director, Vocals (no lead vocals)
- Nicky Stevens– Lead vocals on "Lullaby", "Star". Joint lead vocals on "Images", "Highwayman", "All Night"
- Sandra Stevens– Lead vocals on "Angelo", "The Night of My Life". Joint lead vocals on "Images", "Highwayman", "All Night"
- Simon Skolfield– Recording engineer
- Paul Chave – Sleeve design

== Chart performance ==
Release date	Single	UK Chart position
June 1977	"Angelo"	1
October 1977	"Highwayman"	breaker
Release date	Album	UK Chart position
October 1977	Images	-
