= Lightning Flash =

Studio album by Brotherhood of Man
- Released: July 1983
- Genre: Pop, MOR
- Length: 41:21
- Label: EMI
- Producer: Tony Hiller

Brotherhood of Man chronology
20 Disco Greats / 20 Love Songs (1981)	Lightning Flash (1983)	The Butterfly Children (1992)

Singles from Lightning Flash
- 1. "Lightning Flash" Released: 21 May 1982; 2. "Cry Baby Cry" Released: 13 August 1982; 3. "When the Kissing Stops" Released: July 1983

Lightning Flash is the 12th album by British pop group Brotherhood of Man. Released on EMI Records in 1983, it remains their final commercially released studio album.

== Background ==
The album was released on EMI Records in July 1983 and was their only album with the label. This album was the first (and only) to feature new member Barry Upton who had replaced Lee Sheriden a year earlier and was their last work with long-time manager/producer and co-writer Tony Hiller. Upton took on the musical arrangement duties on ten of the twelve tracks, a role previously filled by Sheriden. Upton worked with studio session drummer Peter Boita at Boita's house in Upper Norwood London, programming all the drum tracks for the album. On going into Odyssey Studios all the drum tracks for the album were laid in one day Boita's LinnDrum computer which was also hooked up to his Simmons SDS7 Electronic drum head unit via a custom interface unit that Boita himself had developed. This method of working was new for its time; before then it was not uncommon for artistes to spend a whole day in a recording studio just to perfect the drum sound that would then be used to underpin the album when all the other musicians were brought in to start work. Peter Boita had briefly worked with Martin Lee when Lee was the lead singer in the Johnny Howard Band in 1973 and Boita was the drummer. The song "I Love Everybody" was arranged by Ivor Raymonde, a long-time hit producer, who used a string quartet heavily in the verses. Another song "Heartbreaker" was taken from their unreleased 1980 album Good Fortune and included here in its original recording, featuring Sheriden on vocals and as arranger.

The album contained the singles "Lightning Flash", "Cry Baby Cry" and "When the Kissing Stops". Of these, only the first managed to chart, their first UK singles chart placing for nearly four years. Commenting on the group's new material, Upton said "we're returning with a new sound, a new look and our sights aimed a lot higher. People can expect good, classy pop songs from us". The front cover of the album only has the lettering B H o M as an indication of a title or artist, the back cover states the group's name, while only the record itself gives the title as Lightning Flash on the label. This is the official title given to the album according to release information. Track "Is it Love" is erroneously titled "It is Love" on the back sleeve, but correct title is given on the record's label. The song "When the Kissing Stops" had been entered into A Song for Europe earlier in 1983, and although the group briefly considered performing it themselves, ultimately a three-piece group, Rubic was chosen to sing it. The song made it to the finals, but stalled at 5th place (out of eight entries). Brotherhood of Man themselves released the song in June 1983 and was featured on BBC Radio 2's airplay chart for the first week of July. It remains their final ever single.

Lightning Flash was to be Brotherhood of Man's final release for a record company as they parted with EMI soon after its release. The group did go on to produce three more albums which were released independently by themselves (The Butterfly Children in 1992, Greenhouse in 1997 and The Seventies Story in 2002).

== Reception ==
Despite being highly regarded by fans, the album failed to chart and met with negative critical response from the music press. Record Mirror writer Sunie said of the "Lightning Flash" single that it was an "absurdly obvious ABBA imitation", but "in the chart absence of the Swede supremos it could do quite well". Writing for Smash Hits, Neil Tennant said of the "Lightning Flash" song that despite its synthesized sound, "the group have failed to capture the freshness that new pop demands". In reviewing the album, Record Mirror's Jim Reid commented on the low budget sound of the music claiming that it was "mortgaged to the hilt" and amounted to "bland mediocrity".

== Track listing ==
Side One

1. "Lightning Flash" (3.19)
2. "Cry Baby Cry" (3.52)
3. "I Don't Need It" (3.32)
4. "I Love Everybody" (3.08)
5. "Run Like Hell" (3.23)
6. "Too Late the Hero" (4.39)

Side Two

1. "When the Kissing Stops" (3.30)
2. "Is it Love" (3.02)
3. "What More Can I Say" (3.35)
4. "Heartbreaker" (3.09)
5. "Jukebox Serenade" (3.11)
6. "Hanging On" (3.01)
- All tracks written by Hiller / Lee / Upton, except "Heartbreaker" by Hiller / Sheriden / Lee

== Personnel ==
- Martin Lee: Lead vocals on "I Don't Need it", "Hanging on"
- Nicky Stevens: Lead vocals on "Lightning Flash", "Run Like Hell", "What More Can I Say", Joint lead vocals on "Cry Baby Cry", "When the Kissing Stops", "Heartbreaker", "Jukebox Serenade"
- Sandra Stevens: Lead vocals on "I Love Everybody", "Too Late the Hero", Joint lead vocals on "Cry Baby Cry", "When the Kissing Stops", "Heartbreaker", "Jukebox Serenade"
- Barry Upton: Lead vocals on "Is it Love"
- Tony Hiller: Producer
- Barry Upton - Arranger
- Ivor Raymonde - Arranger on track 4
- Lee Sheriden - Arranger on track 10
- Credited Musicians: Richard Cottle, Martin Eliott, Roger Odell, Paul Keogh, Peter Boita, Sean McBride, Mike Hornett, Tony Fisher, the Gavin Wright Quartet with Ivor Raymonde
- Cover design and artwork: Cream
