= B for Brotherhood =

Studio album by Brotherhood of Man
- Released: 7 June 1978
- Genres: Pop, MOR
- Length: 38:31
- Label: Pye
- Producer: Tony Hiller

Brotherhood of Man chronology
Images (1977)	B for Brotherhood (1978)	Twenty Greatest (1978)

Singles from B for Brotherhood
- 1. "Figaro" Released: 6 January 1978; 2. "Beautiful Lover" Released: 19 May 1978

B for Brotherhood is the fifth album by pop group Brotherhood of Man. It was released in June 1978 and released on Pye Records. The album featured the UK No.1 single "Figaro" and top 20 hit "Beautiful Lover". On the UK albums chart it reached No.18 and was certified silver for sales of over 60,000 copies.

== Background ==
The album was released on Pye Records in June 1978 and featured the singles "Figaro" and "Beautiful Lover", which were hits in Europe, reaching No.1 and No.15 respectively in the UK. The album was advertised on television, extensively displayed in record shops and even featured as a double-page colour spread in Record Mirror magazine. Helped by this, the album reached No.18 in the UK Charts, their highest charting album to this point. It was certified silver with sales of over 60,000 on 1 September 1978.

The songs on the album were in the group's now full-fledged pop mould, after experimenting with differing styles on their earlier albums. The tracks were mostly sung by the female members of the group and were often commented upon by the media on their similarity in style to ABBA. Like the group's other albums, the tracks were produced by manager Tony Hiller. Member Lee Sheriden was the musical director on six of the songs (including the two singles), while Colin Frechter performed this task on the other six. Sheriden later recalled that the recording sessions would work as follows; "Ten o'clock to one o'clock, we would put down the rhythm section - the guitar, the bass, the piano, drums, percussion and everything. Then in the afternoon the strings would come in and we'd put on all the brass and woodwind. And then in the evening the singers would come in, they'd been in bed all day, while I'd been working, but the idea is the voices would be warmer, you can sing a bit better at night. Recording sessions would then wrap up around midnight".

Track "Greatest Love" is referred to on the label as "The Greatest Love I've Ever Known". Track "People Over the World" was also recorded by pop group Guys 'n' Dolls in early 1978 for an intended single release, but ultimately shelved. It was later covered by duo Peters and Lee and released as a single in 1979. Music videos were recorded for the tracks "Beautiful Lover" "People over the world" and "I'll Never Let You Down", despite the latter never being released as a single.

The album received a mixed review in magazine Music Week saying that it was a "sure seller" and the group were capable of producing "predictable but satisfying slices of MOR pop" but there is "the occasional echo of an ABBA demo".

The front cover of the album does not feature the group's name, although the back cover gives the title as: B for Brotherhood of Man. The album cover depicts the group in an autumn forest and reviews at the time made mention of the sophisticated look of the album. On closer inspection however, it is clear that the forest is merely a photographic backdrop.

The album has never been released on Compact disc, but was released as a digital download in July 2019. It was released along with the following album Higher Than High and several bonus tracks.

== Track listing ==
All tracks composed by Tony Hiller, Lee Sheriden and Martin Lee

Side One

1. "Figaro" – 2:57
2. "Broken Hearted Avenue" – 3:08
3. "Cinderella" – 3:33
4. "When Summer's Gone" – 3:22*
5. "I'll Never Let You Down" – 3:15
6. "In Love" – 3:52

Side Two

1. "Beautiful Lover" – 3:27
2. "I'm in a Dancing Mood" – 3:11
3. "Much Better Than You" – 2:41*
4. "Roulette" – 2:56
5. "Greatest Love" – 3:08
6. "People Over the World" – 3:01

Note * On the cassette version of the album "When Summer's Gone" and "Much Better Than You" were switched in order to even out the lengths of sides

== Personnel ==
- Martin Lee – Lead vocals on "People Over the World"
- Lee Sheriden – Lead vocals on "Broken Hearted Avenue"
- Nicky Stevens and Sandra Stevens – Joint lead vocals on "Figaro", "Cinderella", "When Summer's Gone", "I'll Never Let You Down", "Beautiful Lover", "I'm In a Dancing Mood", "Much Better than You", "Roulette"
- Tony Hiller – Producer
- Lee Sheriden – Musical Director on tracks 1,3,5,6,7,11
- Colin Frechter – Musical Director on tracks 2,4,8,9,10,12
- Terry Evennett – Engineer
- Simeon Skolfield – Engineer
- Simon Fowler and Paul Canty / LFI – Photography
- Angela Joyner – Sleeve design

== Chart performance ==
Release date	Single title	UK Chart position	Ireland	South Africa
January 1978	"Figaro"	1	1	12
May 1978	"Beautiful Lover"	15	6	
Release date	Album title	UK Chart position		
June 1978	B for Brotherhood	18		
