= Good Fortune (Brotherhood of Man album) =

Studio album by Brotherhood of Man
- Released: 1980
- Genre: Pop, MOR
- Length: 37:18
- Label: Dazzle / RCA
- Producer: Tony Hiller

Brotherhood of Man chronology
| Singing a Song (1979) | Good Fortune (1980) | Sing 20 Number One Hits (1980) |

Singles from Good Fortune
- 1. "Honey Don't Throw Our Love Away" Released: 18 April 1980; 2. "Will You Love Me Tomorrow" Released: 6 June 1980; 3. "Sugar Mouse" Released: 1980 (Netherlands only)

Good Fortune is a 1980 album by British pop group Brotherhood of Man. The album was recorded on manager Tony Hiller's label, Dazzle Records, but went unreleased in the UK. The album did get a release however in Australia and New Zealand on RCA Records. Today the album is virtually impossible to get hold of and is considered to be the 'holy grail' among fans.

== Background ==
The album featured the singles "Honey Don't Throw Our Love Away" and "Will You Love Me Tomorrow", which were the first two singles released on Hiller's Dazzle label following their departure from Pye Records at the end of 1979. Track "Sugar Mouse" was released as a single in the Netherlands. Also included on the album was a cover version of the song "You're the Greatest Lover", which had been a million-seller in Europe for the Dutch group Luv', but was unknown in the UK. Album track "Heartbreaker" was later re-used as a track on the group's 1983 album, Lightning Flash (as well as a 1982 B-side).

Like other albums by the group, the style of the tracks was in their trademark pop vein, although a new maturity was present on a number of tracks such as a sombre take on the 1960s hit "Will You Love Me Tomorrow" and ballad, "Let's Get the Show on the Road". This album also saw the group prominently using synthesizers on many tracks for the first time, notably so on songs such as "Saturday Night", which lent the album a more contemporary feel than had been seen on the group's two previous albums. The songs were produced as usual by manager Tony Hiller. Group members Sandra Stevens and Lee Sheriden have both named "Heartbreaker" as their favourite of their own songs. Sheriden says that had the song been released a couple of years earlier, it would have been a hit.

The unusual album cover (for many years unseen by most European fans) depicts the group apparently being held hostage by a robot - possibly in homage to the track "Andrea Android". Another photo session at the time saw the group being menaced by a toy mouse - a possible reference to the "Sugar Mouse" track.

The album was finally released in the UK and other countries as a digital download in August 2019. It was released along with the previous album Singing a Song and several bonus tracks.

== Track listing ==
Side one

1. "Honey Don't Throw Our Love Away" (Hiller / Curtis) (3.00)
2. "You're the Greatest Lover" (Janschen & Janschens) (3.05)
3. "Sugar Mouse" (Hiller / Sheriden / Lee) (2.54)
4. "Saturday Night" (Hiller / Sheriden / Lee) (3.22)
5. "Will You Love Me Tomorrow" (Goffin / King) (3.19)
6. "Heartbreaker" (Hiller / Sheriden / Lee) (3.06)

Side two

1. "Andrea Android" (Hiller / Sheriden / Lee) (3.31)
2. "Crazy" (Hiller / Sheriden / Lee) (2.50)
3. "Let's Get the Show on the Road" (Hiller / Sheriden / Lee) (3.30)
4. "Somebody Else" (Hiller / Sheriden / Lee) (3.04)
5. "Bye Bye One Kiss Goodbye" (Hiller / Sheriden / Lee) (2.37)
6. "This Is the Night" (Hiller / Sheriden / Lee) (3.00)

== Personnel ==
- Tony Hiller: producer
- Martin Lee: Lead vocals on "Let's Get the Show on the Road", Joint lead vocals on "Andrea Android"
- Lee Sheriden: Musical director, Joint lead vocals on "Andrea Android"
- Nicky Stevens and Sandra Stevens: Joint lead vocals on "Honey Don't Throw Our Love Away", "You're the Greatest Lover", "Saturday Night", "Heartbreaker", "Crazy", "Somebody Else", "Bye Bye One Kiss Goodbye"
