= Higher Than High =

Studio album by Brotherhood of Man
- Released: June 1979
- Genre: Pop, MOR
- Length: 33:34
- Label: Pye
- Producer: Tony Hiller

Brotherhood of Man chronology
Twenty Greatest (1978)	Higher Than High (1979)	Singing a Song (1979)

Singles from Higher Than High
- 1. "Middle of the Night" Released: 15 September 1978; 2. "Goodbye Goodbye" Released: 5 January 1979; 3. "Papa Louis" Released: 13 April 1979; 4. "Taxi" Released: 29 June 1979

Higher Than High is a 1979 album released by British pop group Brotherhood of Man. It was released in June and contained four singles.

== Background ==
The album was released in June 1979 on Pye Records. It featured four singles, "Middle of the Night", "Goodbye Goodbye", "Papa Louis" and "Taxi". This was the group's sixth studio album under this line-up but unlike their two previous albums, it failed to chart. "Middle of the Night" had already appeared on the group's Greatest Hits compilation released some months earlier and was the only single to chart, although both "Goodbye Goodbye" and "Papa Louis" had appeared on combined sales and airplay charts. At the time the group had a weekly spot on the Rolf Harris show, Rolf on Saturday, OK?, where they sang several songs from the album (namely "Papa Louis" (twice), "Middle of the Night", "Taxi", "Sleeping Beauty" and "Olé Olé").

The style of the album was in the group's familiar pop mould, but with a shift towards more lightweight themes. The single "Goodbye Goodbye" was a more sombre affair and its failure in the charts led to the next two singles being aimed more at the children's market. "Papa Louis" was about a circus, while "Taxi" was a tale of a man and woman meeting in a taxi. The album, like the group's others was produced by manager Tony Hiller, it continued his trend for short songs, with many of the tracks being less than three minutes, a largely outdated concept at the time given the rise of disco music which was at its peak at the time, which favoured longer-length songs. Music Week said of "Goodbye Goodbye" that it was a change in pace from their previous single, calling it a brave "slow-pounder with the line music almost that of 'Hey Jude'. Should do fairly well or disappear."

According to member Sandra Stevens, the group had undertaken many photo shoots for the album cover, but ultimately, a painting of the group (in a hot air balloon) was used. The artwork was by Dawson Thomas.

The album has never been released on Compact disc, but was released as a digital download in July 2019. It was released along with the previous album B for Brotherhood and several bonus tracks.

== Track listing ==
All tracks composed by Hiller, Sheriden and Lee

Side One

1. "Papa Louis" – 2:27
2. "Sleeping Beauty" – 2:29
3. "Light from Your Window" – 2:57
4. "Tell Me How" – 3:01
5. "Taxi" – 2:33
6. "Middle of the Night" – 3:07

Side Two

1. "Olé Olé" – 2:32
2. "Higher Than High" – 3:06
3. "Part of My Life" – 3:00
4. "Lonely One" – 2:42
5. "Gypsy" – 2:36
6. "Goodbye Goodbye" – 3:25

== Personnel ==
- Martin Lee – Vocals (no lead vocals)
- Lee Sheriden – Musical Director, Vocals (no lead vocals)
- Nicky Stevens – Joint lead vocals on "Light from Your Window", "Taxi", "Middle of the Night"
- Sandra Stevens – Lead vocals on "Gypsy" and joint lead vocals on "Light from Your Window", "Taxi", "Middle of the Night"
- Tony Hiller - Producer

== Singles ==
- 15 September 1978 — "Middle of the Night" / "When Summer's Gone"
- 5 January 1979 — "Goodbye Goodbye" / "Better to Have Loved"
- 13 April 1979 — "Papa Louis" / "For You"
- 29 June 1979 — "Taxi" / "Hi Ho (Together We Go)"

None of the B-sides were featured on the album. "When Summer's Gone" had featured on the group's previous studio album, B for Brotherhood. An alternate recording of "Hi Ho (Together We Go)" was released in countries outside the UK. Release dates from the New Releases booklets.
