= Singing a Song =

Studio album by Brotherhood of Man
- Released: December 1979
- Genre: Pop, MOR
- Length: 34:59
- Label: Pye
- Producer: Tony Hiller

Brotherhood of Man chronology
Higher Than High (1979)	Singing a Song (1979)	Good Fortune (1980)

Singles from Singing a Song
- 1. "Singing a Song" Released: 1980 (Spain only)

Singing a Song is a 1979 album by British pop group Brotherhood of Man. It was released in December and was their final album for Pye Records after several years with the label.

== Background ==
The album was released on Pye Records in December 1979 and was their final album with the label. Pye Records was about to fold at this point, and this album was released to finish their contract and was made up of previously unreleased and rare material. With minimal promotion and the group not having had a hit single for over a year, the album failed to chart. The album featured no singles in the UK, but track "Singing a Song" was released as a single in Spain.

Tracks "The Circus Came to Town" and "Got a Funny Feeling" had been released in Europe as B-Sides in 1977 and 1976 respectively. The former had been available as "Circus" and was later released on CD compilations as "The Night the Circus Came to Town". Track "Caravan" was referred to on the label as "Our Caravan". According to member Lee Sheriden, female members Sandra Stevens and Nicky Stevens were unhappy with the song "Andy McDougal" claiming the lyrics to be sexist and requested the record company not to release it. Sheriden as the co-writer defended the song as an innocent children's pop song. Member Martin Lee has stated that "The Circus Came to Town" is his favourite of their own songs.

The album received a favourable review in the now defunct music paper Superpop, stating: "The group are at their best on the bouncier numbers and "Willie", "Got a Funny Feeling" and "Andy McDougal" are the pick of this platter. The only criticism I have of Singing a Song is that on several numbers the group sound stilted - a fault that is not evident in their very entertaining live show or any of their past single smashes".

The album has never been released on Compact disc, but was released as a digital download in August 2019. It was released along with the following album Good Fortune and several bonus tracks.

== Track listing ==
Side One

1. "Tomorrow" (3.00)
2. "The Circus Came to Town" (3.20)
3. "Singing a Song" (2.59)
4. "Only Love" (3.20)
5. "I Saw Yesterday Today" (3.01)
6. "Gold" (3.06)

Side Two

1. "Willie" (3.05)
2. "I'll Take You Higher Than High" (2.59)
3. "Got a Funny Feeling" (2.30)
4. "Caravan" (2.40)
5. "Vanishing Lady" (2.39)
6. "Andy McDougal" (2.20)
- All tracks written by Hiller / Sheriden / Lee
- Published by Tony Hiller Music / ATV Music

== Personnel ==
- Martin Lee: Lead vocals on "The Circus Came to Town", "Gold", "Vanishing Lady", Joint lead vocals on "Tomorrow"
- Lee Sheriden: Musical Director, Lead vocals on "Got a Funny Feeling", Joint lead vocals on "Tomorrow"
- Nicky Stevens: Lead vocals on "I'll Take You Higher Than High", Joint lead vocals on "I Saw Yesterday Today", "Willie", "Caravan"
- Sandra Stevens: Joint lead vocals on "I Saw Yesterday Today", "Willie", "Caravan"
- Tony Hiller - Producer
- Terry Evennett, Chris Dibble, Simaen Skolfield - Engineers
- Anthony Watling-Darrell - Sleeve design
