= My Sweet Rosalie =

Single by Brotherhood of Man

from the album Oh Boy!
- B-side: "Sugar Honey Love"
- Released: June 1976
- Genre: Pop
- Length: 2:36
- Label: Pye Records
- Songwriter: Lee Sheriden / Martin Lee / Tony Hiller
- Producer: Tony Hiller

Brotherhood of Man singles chronology
"Save Your Kisses for Me" (1976)	"My Sweet Rosalie" (1976)	"Oh Boy (The Mood I'm In)" (1977)

"My Sweet Rosalie" is a 1976 song by British pop group Brotherhood of Man. It was released as the follow-up single to the 1976 Eurovision Song Contest winner, "Save Your Kisses for Me". The song was written by band members Martin Lee and Lee Sheriden with producer Tony Hiller.

== Background ==
Having won the Eurovision Song Contest in April 1976, the group were catapulted to success with the song selling over a million copies in the UK alone. Although they had also just released their second album (Love and Kisses from Brotherhood of Man), the group decided not to release a follow-up single from the album. Instead, they devised a song very similar to the Eurovision winner called "My Sweet Rosalie". Its similarities were heightened by the fact that it included a twist at the end of the song, as did "Save Your Kisses for Me". Member and co-writer Martin Lee admitted to the similarities in an interview at the time, saying "The people have told us exactly where our bag is and what they want to hear. Easy listening has sold us over a million in this country, which is unbelievable and we moulded the follow-up in respect of that". The single was released in early June 1976 with Pye Records issuing it in a picture sleeve, which was a rarity at the time in the UK (although commonplace in the rest of Europe). The single however failed expectations in the UK by only reaching No.30, although it charted much better in Europe, reaching No.2 in Belgium and No.5 in the Netherlands for example.

The song features member Martin Lee on lead vocals and tells of his love for his "sweet Rosalie". The twist at the end of the song is that the object of his affections is a puppy dog. For TV appearances at the time, the group appeared with a live puppy at the end. Member Nicky Stevens had recently got married at the time of promotion and had to delay her honeymoon to perform the song with the group on Top of the Pops. Record Mirror writer Sue Byrom said of the song that it was "a note for note copy" of their previous single, but classed it as a hit.

"My Sweet Rosalie" was backed by a non-album track "Sugar Honey Love" on the B-side and was later issued on the group's third album Oh Boy!. The group re-recorded the song many years later as a medley with later single "Oh Boy (The Mood I'm In)" and appeared on their albums Greenhouse and The Seventies Story.

== Track listing ==
1. "My Sweet Rosalie" (2:36)
2. "Sugar Honey Love" (2:55)

Both tracks written by Martin Lee, Lee Sheriden and Tony Hiller

== Charts ==
=== Weekly charts ===
Chart (1976)	Peak position
Belgium (Ultratop 50 Flanders)	3
Belgium (Ultratop 50 Wallonia)	12
Netherlands (Dutch Top 40)	5
Netherlands (Single Top 100)	5
France (SNEP)	12
UK Singles (OCC)	30
West Germany (GfK)	31

=== Year-end charts ===
Chart (1976)	Position
Belgium (Ultratop Flanders)	22
Netherlands (Dutch Top 40)	50
Netherlands (Single Top 100)	89
