= Oh Boy! (album) =

Studio album by Brotherhood of Man
- Released: March 1977
- Genres: Pop, MOR
- Length: 33:04
- Label: Pye
- Producer: Tony Hiller

Brotherhood of Man chronology
Love and Kisses (1976)	Oh Boy! (1977)	Images (1977)

Alternative cover
- Non-UK version of the album. Titled Midnight Express

Singles from Oh Boy!
- 1. "My Sweet Rosalie" Released: 4 June 1976; 2. "I Give You My Love" Released: October 1976 (not UK); 3. "Tell Me Tell Me Tell Me/New York City" Released: October 1976 (France only); 4. "Oh Boy (The Mood I'm In)" Released: 7 January 1977

Oh Boy! is the third album released by pop group Brotherhood of Man. It was released in 1977 and featured the UK top 10 hit, "Oh Boy (The Mood I'm In)". It was released earlier in some European countries as Midnight Express.

== Background ==
The album was released in March 1977 in the UK and unlike their previous album, failed to make the chart, despite featuring two hit singles. It was released in Europe in November 1976, under the name Midnight Express, without "Oh Boy (The Mood I'm In)", but with another song, "Bag of Money" in its place. On some copies, this album was issued simply as Brotherhood of Man.

This album featured the singles "My Sweet Rosalie" and "Oh Boy (The Mood I'm In)" which were hits in Europe and reached No.30 and No.8 in the UK respectively. Album tracks "I Give You My Love" and "New York City" were released as singles in various European countries in October 1976, with a planned release for the former in the UK, but ultimately abandoned. "New York City" was released in France, but it was the single's B-Side "Tell Me Tell Me Tell Me" (another track from the album) which became the more popular, reaching No.42 in the French singles chart in late 1976. Closing track "Guess Who's Taking You Out Tonight" was covered by The Drifters, albeit unreleased. It was later included as a bonus track on a re-release of their 1976 album Every Nite's a Saturday Night.

The style of the album's tracks followed in a similar vein to the pure pop introduced on "Save Your Kisses for Me" with member Martin Lee taking the lead vocals on many songs, a trend which was largely discontinued after this album. Like the group's other albums, the songs were produced by manager Tony Hiller. In a review, magazine Record Mirror said that "My Sweet Rosalie" was "an almost note-for-note copy" of "Save Your Kisses for Me".

Oh Boy! was released on Compact disc in a double set with Images in May 2009.

== Track listing ==
All tracks written by Tony Hiller / Lee Sheriden / Martin Lee except "Oh Boy (The Mood I'm In)" by Tony Romeo

=== Oh Boy! ===
Side One

1. "Oh Boy (The Mood I'm In)" (3.14)
2. "I Give You My Love" (2.48)
3. "Cross My Heart" (2.52)
4. "Tell Me Tell Me Tell Me" (2.40)
5. "New York City" (2.54)
6. "Midnight Express" (3.03)

Side Two

1. "My Sweet Rosalie" (2.36)
2. "Shimmy Shimmy Shamay" (2.47)
3. "Daisy" (2.32)
4. "Lady Liar" (2.38)
5. "Goodnight Sleepyhead" (2.28)
6. "Guess Who's Taking You Out Tonight" (2.36)

CD Bonus tracks:

1. "Bag of Money" (2.42)
2. "Sugar Honey Love" (2.50)
3. "Closer, Closer" (2.39)

=== Midnight Express ===
Side One

1. "My Sweet Rosalie"
2. "Midnight Express"
3. "Cross My Heart"
4. "Tell Me Tell Me Tell Me"
5. "New York City"
6. "I Give You My Love"

Side Two

1. "Daisy"
2. "Bag of Money"
3. "Shimmy Shimmy Shamay"
4. "Lady Liar"
5. "Goodnight Sleepyhead"
6. "Guess Who's Taking You Out Tonight"

== Personnel ==
- Tony Hiller– Producer
- Martin Lee– Lead vocals on "I Give You My Love", "My Sweet Rosalie", "Daisy", "Lady Liar" "Guess Who's Taking You Out Tonight"
- Lee Sheriden– Musical Director, Lead vocals on "New York City"
- Nicky Stevens– Lead vocals on "Cross My Heart". Joint lead vocals on "Shimmy Shimmy Shamay"
- Sandra Stevens– Lead vocals on "Oh Boy (The Mood I'm In)", "Tell Me Tell Me Tell Me", "Goodnight Sleepyhead"(, "Bag of Money"). Joint lead vocals on "Shimmy Shimmy Shamay"
- Simaen Skolfield– Recording engineer
- Karl Brown– Assistant engineer
- Recorded at Central Sound Studio
- Sleeve by Design Machine

== Chart performance ==
Release date	Single title	UK Chart position
June 1976	"My Sweet Rosalie"	30
January 1977	"Oh Boy (The Mood I'm In)"	8
Release date	Album title	UK Chart position
March 1977	Oh Boy!	-
