= The Seventies Story =

Studio album by Brotherhood of Man
- Released: November 2002
- Genres: Pop, MOR
- Length: 64.03
- Producer: Brotherhood of Man

Brotherhood of Man chronology
Greenhouse (1997)	The Seventies Story (2002)

The Seventies Story is the sixteenth and final studio album by pop group Brotherhood of Man, released in 2002. It is based on a live stage show the group had undertaken at the time.

== Overview ==
The show reflects on the music and events of the 1970s, with the group performing the songs, while one of the members narrates events in between. Songs from the show were recorded and included on this album, which was not officially released by a record company, but was produced by the group themselves for sale at the show or by mail order. The tracks from the album have since been released on generally available compact discs and for download. It is the group's first album to be solely available on CD and remains their most recent album release. Included among the tracks are a number of Brotherhood of Man's own hits such as "Save Your Kisses for Me". The album contains 26 tracks (although boasts 29 - the other three being part of a medley), most of which are full-length versions, while some are shortened down to one-minute snippets. Track "Let Me Sleep On It" is a retitling of Meat Loaf's "Paradise by the Dashboard Light", which while never a single in the United Kingdom, was a song the group had performed in concert for many years previously. Track "I Could Be So Good for You" is included to signify the beginning of the television series Minder, though the song itself wasn't a hit until 1980.

The group continued up to 2020 to perform the show and concerts around the United Kingdom and have received good reviews up to Martin Lee's passing.

== Track listing ==
1. "Love Grows" (Mason / Macaulay) 2.37
  Originally by Edison Lighthouse, 1970
2. "United We Stand" (Hiller / Goodison) 2.50
  Originally by The Brotherhood of Man, 1970
3. "Ernie" (Hill) 0.58
  Originally by Benny Hill, 1971
4. "Hot Love" (Bolan) 1.43
  Originally by T. Rex, 1971
5. "Puppy Love" (Anka) 1.05
  Based on version by Donny Osmond, 1972
6. "Daydreamer" (Demspey) 2.07
  Originally by David Cassidy, 1973
7. "Live and Let Die" (McCartney / McCartney) 1.16
  Originally by Wings, 1973
8. "Tie a Yellow Ribbon" (Brown / Levine) 2.56
  Originally by Tony Orlando and Dawn, 1973
9. "Remember You're a Womble" (Batt) 2.04
  Originally by The Wombles, 1974
10. "I've Got the Music in Me" (Boshell) 3.02
  Originally by Kiki Dee, 1974
11. "Shang-A-Lang / Bye Bye Baby" (Coulter / Crewe / Gaudio) 2.55
  Originally by/Based on version by Bay City Rollers, 1974/75
12. "Save Your Kisses for Me" (Hiller / Sheriden / Lee) 3.01
13. "Miss You Nights" (Townsend) 3.06
  Originally by Cliff Richard, 1976
14. "My Sweet Rosalie" / "Oh Boy (The Mood I'm In)" (Hiller / Sheriden / Lee / Romeo) 3.04
15. "Don't Give Up on Us Baby" (Macaulay) 1.27
  Originally by David Soul, 1976
16. "Angelo" (Hiller / Sheriden / Lee) 3.03
17. "Got to Get You Into My Life" (Lennon / McCartney) 4.04
  Based on version by Earth, Wind and Fire, 1978
18. "Figaro" (Hiller / Sheriden / Lee) 2.55
19. "You're the One That I Want" / "Summer Nights" (Farrar / Jacobs / Casey) 2.24
  Originally by John Travolta and Olivia Newton-John, 1978
20. "Blame It on the Boogie" (Jackson-Clark / Jackson-Rich / Krohn) 2.22
  Originally by Mick Jackson, 1978
21. "Beautiful Lover" (Hiller / Sheriden / Lee) 3.10
22. "Let Me Sleep On It" (Steinman) 4.13
  Originally by Meat Loaf, 1977
23. "I Could Be so Good for You" (Kenny / Waterman) 1.13
  Originally by Dennis Waterman, 1980
24. "I Will Survive" (Fakaris) 2.33
  Originally by Gloria Gaynor, 1979
25. "Tragedy" (Gibb / Gibb / Gibb) 3.30
  Originally by Bee Gees, 1979
26. "Y.M.C.A." (Morali / Belolo / Willis) 3.25
  Originally by Village People, 1978
