= Beautiful Lover =

Single by Brotherhood of Man

from the album B for Brotherhood
- B-side: "Much Better Than You"
- Released: 19 May 1978
- Genre: Pop, disco
- Length: 3:29
- Label: Pye Records
- Songwriter: Tony Hiller / Martin Lee / Lee Sheriden
- Producer: Tony Hiller

Brotherhood of Man singles chronology
"Figaro" (1978)	"Beautiful Lover" (1978)	"Middle of the Night" (1978)

"Beautiful Lover" is a song by British pop group Brotherhood of Man, released as a single in 1978. The single became a UK top 20 hit in the summer, also hitting the Irish top 10. It was released on Pye Records and was featured on the group's fifth album B for Brotherhood.

== Background ==
Brotherhood of Man had enjoyed a three-year run of hits by 1978 and had just scored their third UK number one single with the song "Figaro" at the start of the year. "Beautiful Lover" was the follow-up, composed by group members Martin Lee, Lee Sheriden and their manager Tony Hiller, who also produced the song. The single was originally slated to be released on 11 May, but put back by a week and was bolstered with advertising by badges, tee-shirts and press/store promotion. Eventually released on Friday, 19 May, it was shortly followed by the group's fifth studio album, B for Brotherhood, which also became a UK top 20 hit. The single was reviewed in Record Mirror by Bob Geldof who predictably gave it short shrift, while threatening that The Boomtown Rats would cover it!

The single entered the UK charts in late May and peaked at No.15 during a 12-week run. It also charted well in Ireland, rising to No.6 there. The song also entered the charts in the Netherlands and Belgium.

The group performed the song on Top of the Pops three times, on 18 May, 8 and 22 June. A promotional video for the song was produced, largely a rarity at the time, which was a simple performance video of them on stage. A clip from this video was used in a TV advertisement for their current album.

The B-side of the song was "Much Better Than You", also a song included on the B for Brotherhood album. Both songs featured lead vocals by the two female members of the group. "Beautiful Lover" was to be the group's final top 40 single. It was also included on their Twenty Greatest album, released later in the year.

The song was later featured in an episode of sitcom Gimme Gimme Gimme in 2001, where lead character Tom was seen dancing to it in his bedroom.

== Track listing ==
1. "Beautiful Lover" (Hiller/Sheriden/Lee) 3:29
2. "Much Better Than You" (Hiller/Sheriden/Lee) 2:38

== Chart performance ==
Chart (1978)	Peak position
Belgium top 50 singles	30
Irish singles chart	6
Netherlands top 100	50
UK singles chart	15
