= List of number-one singles of 1976 (France) =

This is a list of the French Singles & Airplay Chart Reviews number-ones of 1976.

== Summary ==
=== Singles Chart ===
Week	Date	Artist	Single
1	1 January	Nicolas Peyrac	"Et mon père"
2	8 January	Nicolas Peyrac	"Et mon père"
3	15 January	Nestor le Pingouin	"À la pêche aux moules"
4	22 January	Nestor le Pingouin	"À la pêche aux moules"
5	29 January	Joe Dassin	"Ça va pas changer le monde"
6	5 February	Dalida	"J'attendrai"
7	12 February	Dalida	"J'attendrai"
8	19 February	Sylvie Vartan	"Qu'est-ce qui fait pleurer les blondes?"
9	26 February	Sylvie Vartan	"Qu'est-ce qui fait pleurer les blondes?"
10	4 March	Johnny Hallyday	"Requiem pour un fou"
11	11 March	Johnny Hallyday	"Requiem pour un fou"
12	18 March	Johnny Hallyday	"Requiem pour un fou"
13	25 March	Johnny Hallyday	"Requiem pour un fou"
14	1 April	Brotherhood of Man	"Save Your Kisses for Me"
15	8 April	Brotherhood of Man	"Save Your Kisses for Me"
16	15 April	Brotherhood of Man	"Save Your Kisses for Me"
17	22 April	Brotherhood of Man	"Save Your Kisses for Me"
18	29 April	Brotherhood of Man	"Save Your Kisses for Me"
19	6 May	Les Supporters	"Allez les verts"
20	13 May	Les Supporters	"Allez les verts"
21	20 May	Michel Sardou	"Je vais t'aimer"
22	27 May	Michel Sardou	"Je vais t'aimer"
23	3 June	Johnny Hallyday	"Derrière l'amour"
24	10 June	Johnny Hallyday	"Derrière l'amour"
25	17 June	Sheila	"Patrick mon chéri"
26	24 June	Joe Dassin	"Il etait une fois nous deux"
27	1 July	Sheila	"Patrick mon chéri"
28	8 July	Sheila	"Patrick mon chéri"
29	15 July	Sheila	"Patrick mon chéri"
30	22 July	Johnny Hallyday	"Derrière l'amour"
31	29 July	Johnny Hallyday	"Derrière l'amour"
32	5 August	Johnny Hallyday	"Derrière l'amour"
33	12 August	Johnny Hallyday	"Derrière l'amour"
34	19 August	Jeanette	"Porque te vas"
35	26 August	Jeanette	"Porque te vas"
36	2 September	Jeanette	"Porque te vas"
37	9 September	Johnny Hallyday	"Gabrielle"
38	16 September	Johnny Hallyday	"Gabrielle"
39	23 September	Johnny Hallyday	"Gabrielle"
40	30 September	Johnny Hallyday	"Gabrielle"
41	7 October	Michel Sardou	"La vieille"
42	14 October	Michel Sardou	"La vieille"
43	21 October	Sheila	"Les femmes"
44	28 October	Boney M.	"Daddy Cool"
45	4 November	Boney M.	"Daddy Cool"
46	11 November	Boney M.	"Daddy Cool"
47	18 November	Frédéric François	"San Francisco"
48	25 November	Frédéric François	"San Francisco"
49	2 December	Boney M.	"Daddy Cool"
50	9 December	Boney M.	"Daddy Cool"
51	16 December	ABBA	"Money, Money, Money"
52	23 December	ABBA	"Money, Money, Money"
53	30 December	ABBA	"Money, Money, Money"

== See also ==
- 1976 in music
- List of number-one hits (France)
