= Good Things Happening =

Studio album by Brotherhood of Man
- Released: September 1974
- Genre: Pop; MOR; soul
- Length: 37:49
- Label: Dawn
- Producer: Tony Hiller

Brotherhood of Man chronology
| The World of the Brotherhood of Man (1973) | Good Things Happening (1974) | Love and Kisses (1976) |

Singles from Good Things Happening
- 1. "When Love Catches Up On You" Released: 18 January 1974; 2. "Lady" Released: 17 June 1974; 3. "Lady Lady Lay" Released: 15 November 1974; 4. "Spring of 1912" Released: 17 January 1975

Good Things Happening is the first album released by the new lineup of pop group Brotherhood of Man. This lineup consisted of Martin Lee, Lee Sheriden, Nicky Stevens and Sandra Stevens and was to be the main lineup of the group's history and would hold for the next ten albums. It contains their first European hit "Lady" which was a hit in Belgium and the Netherlands.

== Background ==
This album was released in September 1974 on the Dawn label. It featured the singles "When Love Catches Up on You", "Lady", "Lady Lady Lady Lay" and "Spring of 1912". None of these found success in the UK, although the single "Lady" was a hit in the Netherlands and Belgium. Record Mirror said of "When Love Catches Up On You" that it had a "well-constructed string-backed chorus" but felt it took too long to build to become a hit, but did say Brotherhood of Man were "one of the best harmony groups in the business".

The album was produced by the group's manager, Tony Hiller. The songs on the album were of a more diverse nature to the pure pop the group would later become famous for, with themes including a song about prostitution ("Lady"), open air sex ("Movin' With Susan") and a real-life tragedy ("Spring of 1912"). Many tracks featured a soul-based sound, although pure pop was present on songs such as "Do-Be-Do" and "Have You Been a Good Boy". Other notable tracks included a cover of The Hollies' "He Ain't Heavy, He's My Brother", which showcased the group's harmonies and was a song they'd performed in their live shows. Member Nicky Stevens has said that this is her favourite recording with the group. They also performed this song before the Queen at a televised charity show in 1976.

A reissue of Good Things Happening was released on Compact disc for the first time in May 2009.

== Track listing ==
Side One

1. "Join the Party" (Hiller / Sheriden / Lee) (2.52)
2. "Welcome Sunday Morning" (Hiller / Sheriden) (3.22)
3. "Lady Lady Lady Lay" (Hiller / Groscolas / Jourdan) (2.54)
4. "When Love Catches Up on You" (Hiller / Sheriden) (2.55)
5. "Spring of 1912" (Hiller / Sheriden / Lee) (2.55)
6. "Lady" (Hiller / Sheriden / Lee) (3.25)

Side Two

1. "Movin' with Susan" (Hiller / Sheriden / Lee) (2.30)
2. "Every Day of My Life" (Hiller / Sheriden / Lee) (3.15)
3. "Do-Be-Do" (Hiller / Sheriden / Lee) (2.43)
4. "Good Things Happening" (Hiller / Sheriden / Lee / Poole) (3.35)
5. "Have You Been a Good Boy" (Hiller / Sheriden / Lee) (3.01)
6. "He Ain't Heavy, He's My Brother" (Russell Scott) (4.22)

CD bonus tracks

1. "How Can You Love" (3.09)
2. "Love's Bound to Get Ya" (3.18)

== Personnel ==
- Martin Lee – lead vocals on "Lady Lady Lady Lay", "Lady", "Do-Be-Do". Joint lead vocals on "Good Things Happening"
- Lee Sheriden – lead vocals on "Join the Party", "Welcome Sunday Morning", "Movin' with Susan"
- Nicky Stevens – lead vocals on "When Love Catches Up on You". Joint lead vocals on "Good Things Happening", "Have You Been a Good Boy"
- Sandra Stevens – lead vocals on "Every Day of My Life". Joint lead vocals on "Have You Been a Good Boy".
- Tony Hiller – producer
- Colin Frechter – arranger
