= Midnight Express =

Midnight Express may refer to:

- Midnight Express (book), a 1977 book by Billy Hayes and William Hoffer
- Midnight Express (film), a 1978 film dramatization of the book

== Film and television ==
- The Midnight Express (film), a 1924 romantic film

== Music ==
=== Albums ===
- Midnight Express, alternate title of the album Oh, Boy! by Brotherhood of Man
- Midnight Express (EP), an extended play album by the band Gyroscope

=== Songs ===
- "Midnight Express", by Brotherhood of Man from the album Oh, Boy!
- "Midnight Express", an instrumental by rock band Extreme from Waiting for the Punchline

== Other uses ==
- The Midnight Express (professional wrestling), a professional wrestling tag team in the 1980s
- Midnight Express, a 1993 military rescue operation conducted by the Sri Lankan Army, led by Sarath Fonseka
- Sleeper train
