= Love and Kisses from Brotherhood of Man =

Studio album by Brotherhood of Man
- Released: September 1975 / 2 April 1976
- Recorded: 1975–1976
- Genres: Pop, MOR, soul
- Length: 35:45
- Label: Pye
- Producer: Tony Hiller

Brotherhood of Man chronology
Good Things Happening (1974)	Love and Kisses from Brotherhood of Man (1975)	Oh Boy! (1977)

Alternative cover
- Non-UK version of the album. Titled Save Your Kisses for Me

Singles from Love and Kisses from Brotherhood of Man
- 1. "Kiss Me Kiss Your Baby" Released: May 1975; 2. "Be My Loving Baby" Released: 1975 (France, Belgium only); 3. "Save Your Kisses for Me" Released: March 1976; 4. "Sweet Lady from Georgia" Released: 1976 (US only)

Love and Kisses from Brotherhood of Man (usually referred to as simply Love and Kisses) is the second album released by the new line-up of British pop group Brotherhood of Man. It was released in the UK the day before their 1976 Eurovision win with "Save Your Kisses for Me", which the album contained. An earlier version (without "Save Your Kisses for Me") was released in September 1975.

== Background ==
In line with their previous album, the style of the album's tracks was more soul-based than the pure pop for which the group would become famous, although pop is present on the track "Cry Thief". Like the group's other albums, the songs were produced by manager Tony Hiller. It was mostly recorded in mid 1975 at Eden Studios in West London.

During recording sessions, member Lee Sheriden had come up with a song called "Save Your Kisses for Me", which was then reworked into "Ocean of Love". Sheriden was unhappy with the changes and shelved the song. On coming up with a song to present to Eurovision Sheriden presented this song again in its original form. This time it was accepted and Sheriden himself sang lead vocals. The decision was then taken for other male member Martin Lee to sing it, which Sheriden was satisfied with.

The new version of the album was released in the UK the day before their win in the 1976 Eurovision Song Contest, and became the group's first hit album, reaching No.20 in the UK. It also reached No.6 in Norway and No.24 in Sweden. It was certified silver in the UK for sales of over 60,000. Record Mirror reviewed the album in April stating that the album contained several happy songs with a bouncy feel (similar to "Save Your Kisses for Me"). It advised that since "Kiss Me Kiss Your Baby" had been a hit in Europe that it would be "a good revitalised single and a natural successor to their current hit". It also commended the group's "sheer pop professionalism". In a unique move, Pye Records advertised the album by a 40 foot banner behind the goal at an international football game between England and the American All-Stars in Philadelphia on 27 May 1976. The match was televised worldwide and the record company said that "this is the first time a UK record company has taken album-promoting space on such an international scale." The promotion cost £1,750.

This album was originally released in 1975, without "Save Your Kisses for Me", but with another song, "Tugging" in its place. In some countries it was released as Save Your Kisses for Me in 1976, with "Tugging", but without "Love Me for What I Am"

The album featured the singles "Kiss Me Kiss Your Baby" and "Save Your Kisses for Me". Album track "Be My Loving Baby" was released as a single in Belgium and France in 1975. In the US, "Sweet Lady from Georgia" was released as the follow-up to "Save Your Kisses for Me". This was the only country to release a follow-up from this album.

Somewhat curiously, the album contained the same cover photo as had been on their first album, released a year previously.

Love and Kisses from Brotherhood of Man was released on compact disc for the first time in May 2009. This was in a double-pack with Good Things Happening.

== Track listing ==
All tracks written by Hiller / Sheriden / Lee, except "Kiss Me Kiss Your Baby" by Barry Blue

Side One

1. "Save Your Kisses for Me" (3.06)
2. "Now" (3.23)
3. "Cry Thief" (2.44)
4. "Nothing in the World" (2.51)
5. "Sweet Lady from Georgia" (2.46)
6. "Kiss Me Kiss Your Baby" (3.06)

Side Two

1. "Shame on You Baby" (2.51)
2. "Be My Loving Baby" (3.18)
3. "Dream On" (2.57)
4. "Love Me for What I Am" (3.11)
5. "I'm so Much in Love" (2.38)
6. "You Are Love" (2:54)

CD bonus tracks

1. "Tugging" (3.35)
2. "Put Out the Fire" (2.16)
3. "Let's Love Together" (2.54)

== Personnel ==
- Martin Lee – lead vocals on "Save Your Kisses for Me", "Nothing in the World", "Be My Loving Baby", "Dream On", ("Tugging"). Joint lead vocals on "Kiss Me Kiss Your Baby", "Shame on You Baby", "You are Love"
- Lee Sheriden – musical Director, lead vocals on "Sweet Lady from Georgia". Joint lead vocals on "You are Love"
- Nicky Stevens – lead vocals on "Love Me for What I Am", "I'm so Much in Love". Joint lead vocals on "Kiss Me Kiss Your Baby", "Shame on You Baby"
- Sandra Stevens – lead vocals on "Cry Thief"
- Tony Hiller – producer
- Graham Prescott – musical Director on "Kiss Me Kiss Your Baby"

== Chart performance ==
Release date	Single title	UK Charts	Netherlands	Belgium	Austria	New Zealand	Sweden	Norway	South Africa
June 1975	"Kiss Me Kiss Your Baby"	-	2	1	10	27	-	-	-
March 1976	"Save Your Kisses for Me"	1	1	1	3	9	6	1	4
Release date	Album title	UK	Australia	Norway	Sweden				
April 1976	Love and Kisses from Brotherhood of Man	20	96	6	24				
