= Barry Upton =

- Born: Barry John Upton; 25 February 1954 (age 72); Hastings, Sussex, England
- Origin: Pattaya, Thailand
- Genres: Pop
- Occupations: Songwriter, musician, producer, audio engineer, TV & radio presenter
- Formerly of: Brotherhood of Man
- Website: www.barryupton.com

Barry John Upton (born 25 February 1954) is an English singer, songwriter, arranger, musician and producer of pop, rock and electronic dance.

He lives in Pattaya, Thailand, where he is the executive producer for radio & TV at Pattaya People Media Group and has been presenting the morning show on 96FM Radio since 2010.

== Career ==
In the early 1980s, Upton was a member of Brotherhood of Man, appearing in concert with them. Although not a member of the band at the time of their win at the Eurovision Song Contest, he was their musical arranger and co-wrote much of their material during his time with them in 1982-1984. In 1997, he co-created the pop band, Steps with Steve Crosby.

His writing and/or production credits include:

- Lightning Flash – Brotherhood of Man (1983)
- "I'm in the Mood For Dancing '89" – The Nolans (1989)
- "Only Fools (Never Fall in Love)" – Sonia (1991)
- "5,6,7,8" – UK Top Twenty hit co-written with Steve Crosby – Steps (1997)
- Dollar's Greatest Hits – Dollar (re-recorded versions)
- "Bunsen Burner" – UK Top Ten hit co-written with John Otway (2002)
- Gold: Greatest Hits – Steps (2002)
- "Cheeky Flamenco" – The Cheeky Girls (2003)
- "You've Got Me Dancing" (featured in the movie, Little Miss Sunshine, and co-written with Gordon Pogoda)
- "Gasoline" and "World Ain't Over" – Pedwell (2007)
- The Complete Halloween Party Album (2007)
- My Favourite TV Themes (2008)
- My Favourite Musicals 1
- My Favourite Musicals 2
- The Grease Party
