= Oh Boy (The Mood I'm In) =

Single by Diana Trask

from the album The Mood I'm In
- B-side: "Alone Again Naturally"
- Released: December 1974
- Genre: Country
- Length: 2:30
- Label: ABC–Dot
- Songwriter: Tony Romeo
- Producer: Jim Foglesong

Diana Trask singles chronology
"(If You Wanna Hold on) Hold on to Your Man" (1974)	"Oh Boy" (1974)	"There Has to Be a Loser" (1975)

"Oh Boy (The Mood I'm In)" is a popular song written by Tony Romeo. It has been recorded by Diana Trask and Brotherhood of Man, among others. The song is about a woman whose partner/husband is no longer with her and she sadly walks the streets in an attempt to find him. Tony Romeo who wrote the song is best known for his 1970 hit "I Think I Love You" by The Partridge Family, which became a US No.1.

== Diana Trask version ==
=== Background, recording and content ===
Diana Trask first formed a career as a pop singer recording for Columbia Records and appearing on the television program Sing Along with Mitch. She then reinvented herself as a country artist after developing an interest in their music community. She had her most successful country period during the seventies decade with several US top 20 and top 40 single releases. Among these charting songs was 1974's "Oh Boy". In her memoir, Trask wrote that producer Jim Foglesong had found "Oh Boy" and believed it to be a hit. Trask returned from a stint performing in Las Vegas to cut the track and after recording it, she also believed it could be successful. Written by Tony Romeo and produced by Foglesong, "Oh Boy"'s story line centered on a woman who was in search of her partner who she suspected to be out drinking in local bars.

=== Release, critical reception and chart performance ===
"Oh Boy" was released as a single by ABC–Dot Records in December 1974 as a seven-inch vinyl record featuring the B-side "Alone Again Naturally". Billboard magazine called the track, "Well produced with nice melody changes" and found that Trask "never sounding better". Cash Box called Trask's voice "dynamic" and believed it be "a sure hit". Trask claimed her version never received promotion from ABC–Dot due to label re-configuration and called it "one of my biggest professional disappointments". Meanwhile, Bobby Wyld of WYTRA Records claimed that he did not give ABC-Dot permission to release Trask's version in belief that her version "won't get airplay". He ultimately sued the company for one million dollars, as reported by Radio & Records.

Despite this, "Oh Boy" rose to the number 21 position on the US Billboard Hot Country Songs chart, becoming Trask's final top 40 single there. In Canada, it rose to number 14 on their RPM Country Tracks chart. It reached the top ten on Australia's Kent Music Report chart, peaking at the number ten position in 1975. It was Trask's first charting single in Australia since 1960 and her only top ten song there. It also appeared on Trask's tenth studio album titled The Mood I'm In.

=== Track listings ===
7" vinyl single

- "Oh Boy" – 2:30
- "Alone Again Naturally" – 3:41

=== Weekly charts ===
Weekly chart performance for "Oh Boy"
Chart (1974–1975)	Peak position
Australia (Kent Music Report)	10
Canada Country Tracks (RPM)	14
US Hot Country Songs (Billboard)	21

=== Year-end charts ===
Chart (1975)	Position
Australia (Kent Music Report)	47

=== Certifications ===
Region	Certification	Certified units/sales
Australia (ARIA)	Gold	50,000^{^}
^{^} Shipments figures based on certification alone.

== Brotherhood of Man version ==
"Oh Boy (The Mood I'm In)"

Single by Brotherhood of Man

from the album Oh Boy!
- B-side: "Closer Closer"
- Released: 7 January 1977
- Genre: Pop
- Length: 3.14
- Label: Pye Records
- Songwriter: Tony Romeo
- Producer: Tony Hiller

Brotherhood of Man singles chronology
"My Sweet Rosalie" (1976)	"Oh Boy (The Mood I'm In)" (1977)	"Angelo" (1977)

In 1977, the song was recorded by UK pop group Brotherhood of Man. The group had won the Eurovision Song Contest the year before and were looking for their next big hit when their producer Tony Hiller came upon this song. Given a new pop slant, the song became a hit in Europe, including the UK where it peaked at #8 during a 12-week run. It featured on their subsequent album Oh Boy!

=== Track listing ===
1. "Oh Boy (The Mood I'm In)" (Tony Romeo) 3.14
2. "Closer Closer" (Hiller / Sheriden / Lee) 2.39

=== Chart performance ===
Country (1977)	Peak position
UK	8
Ireland	6
Netherlands	7
Belgium	9
