= Dawn Records =

British record label

- Parent company: Pye Records
- Founded: 1969
- Genre: Pop, rock, folk
- Country of origin: United Kingdom

Dawn Records was a subsidiary of Pye Records. Active from 1969 to 1975, it was established as Pye's 'underground and progressive' label rivalling the EMI and Phonogram equivalents, Harvest and Vertigo.

The most successful act on the label was Mungo Jerry, whose first two singles reached No. 1 on the UK singles chart. The label also released the 1970 and 1971 Donovan albums, Open Road and the double-album HMS Donovan. It also released recordings by Man, Paul Brett's Sage, Titus Groan, Trifle, Mike Cooper, Heron, John Kongos (before he found greater success on the Fly label), Comus, Atlantic Bridge, Pluto, Atomic Rooster and the Mungo Jerry offshoot, the King Earl Boogie Band.

In October 1970, the UK music magazine NME reported that Dawn label acts Demon Fuzz, Titus Groan, Heron and Comus were due to take part in a series of UK concerts in November 1970. At all venues the price of admission was one penny.

Two other acts were Brotherhood of Man in their Eurovision-winning line-up, who released their first album, Good Things Happening, in 1974; and Prelude, whose a cappella version of the Neil Young song "After the Gold Rush" (No. 21, 1974) was the label's only other UK hit single.

== See also ==
- Lists of record labels
