= Brotherhood of Man =

British pop group

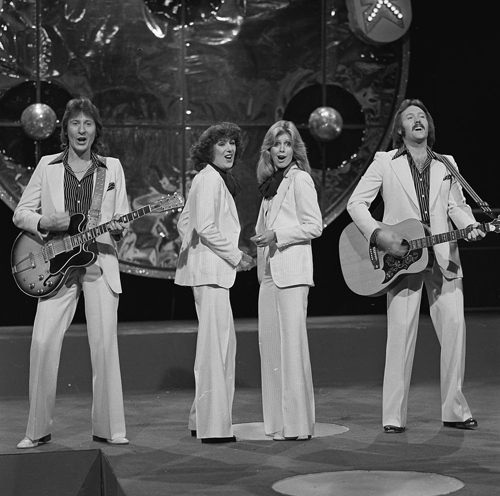
- Brotherhood of Man performing on the Dutch television programme Kwistig met muziek in 1977. Left to right: Lee Sheriden, Nicky Stevens, Sandra Stevens, and Martin Lee.

Background information
- Origin: London, England
- Genres: Pop, MOR, blue-eyed soul
- Years active: 1969–2020
- Labels: Pye, EMI, Dawn, Deram, Dazzle, Warwick
- Past members: Tony Burrows; Sunny Leslie; Sue Glover; Roger Greenaway; John Goodison; Hal Atkinson; Russell Stone; Martin Lee; Nicky Stevens; Lee Sheriden; Sandra Stevens
- Website: brotherhoodofman.co.uk

Brotherhood of Man were a British pop group who achieved success in the 1970s with three number one hits in the UK. They won the Eurovision Song Contest 1976 with "Save Your Kisses for Me".

Created in 1969 by songwriter and record producer Tony Hiller, Brotherhood of Man was initially an umbrella title for a frequently-changing line-up of session singers. Early on, they scored a worldwide hit with the song "United We Stand". By 1973 the concept had run its course and Hiller formed a definite four-member line-up consisting of Martin Lee, Lee Sheriden, Nicky Stevens and Sandra Stevens. This version of the group went on to score many hits around the world in the mid to late 1970s including "Kiss Me Kiss Your Baby", "Save Your Kisses for Me", "Angelo", "Oh Boy (The Mood I'm In)" and "Figaro". They achieved perhaps their biggest success in their native UK with three number one singles and four top twenty albums. The group under this line-up continued into the 21st century performing shows throughout Europe. Altogether, they released 16 studio albums, with worldwide sales topping 15 million records.

== History ==
=== Original line-up ===
Brotherhood of Man was formed by record producer/composer Tony Hiller in 1969, and originally featured his co-writer John Goodison (who performed as Goodison but wrote under the pseudonyms Peter Simmons and Peter Simons) with Tony Burrows, Roger Greenaway, Sue Glover and Sunny Leslie. Greenaway was also a songwriter and had co-written hits such as "Something's Gotten Hold of My Heart" and "Melting Pot". Burrows was a well-known session singer, performing in various line-ups on hit singles such as the No.1 hit "Love Grows (Where My Rosemary Goes)" by Edison Lighthouse. The two female members, Glover and Leslie were an act in their own right, releasing singles as Sue and Sunny.

The group came together in 1969 and began recording some songs with Hiller. Their first single "Love One Another" failed to chart, but the follow-up "United We Stand" (released in January 1970) was a worldwide hit. "United We Stand" was heavily played on British radio, and broke into the American market. The single became a Top 20 hit in the UK, Canada, Australia and US. The song was used as the closing theme for television's The Brady Bunch Hour and as an anthem for various causes. Burrows left the group soon after and as a four-piece, The Brotherhood of Man followed "United We Stand" with another hit, "Where Are You Going to My Love". The song charted in the UK, Canada, and US and has since been covered by Olivia Newton-John and The Osmonds among others. A début album United We Stand followed soon after.

Over the next two years, the group continued in varied line-ups. Goodison left the group at the beginning of 1971 and was replaced by American singer Hal Atkinson, Greenaway left soon after and was replaced by Russell Stone. They had one more minor hit in the US (1971's "Reach Out Your Hand"), but experienced no further success in the UK and split after being dropped by their record company.

=== Current line-up ===
Keen to keep the established name alive, Hiller set about putting a new line up together. In 1972 he got together a trio of session singers, Martin Lee, Nicky Stevens and Lee Sheriden.

Sheriden was already known to Hiller as a songwriter and had a solo career. Lee had a solo single to his name and was a budding songwriter. Stevens had been classically trained, but had since adapted her vocals and was performing as a cabaret singer. The trio began recording together, but their first single, "Rock Me Baby", to be released at the end of 1972, was cancelled due to the release of the song by David Cassidy. Finally their first two singles "Happy Ever After" and "Our World of Love" were released in 1973. Neither single charted and soon after, another female vocalist was added to the line up, Sandra Stevens. Stevens (no relation to Nicky) had been performing as a big-band singer since a teenager in the late 1960s. She had sung with the Joe Loss big band and alongside Eve Graham (of The New Seekers) in club group, The Nocturnes.

Now signed to the Pye spin off label, Dawn, the quartet released their first single, "When Love Catches Up on You" in January 1974. It failed to chart, but the follow-up single, "Lady" became a hit in Europe. Encouraged by this, the group set about recording their debut album. The album Good Things Happening was released later in the year along with two more singles, but none of these found success. Before the record label folded, Brotherhood of Man released one more single in the Summer of 1975. This was the upbeat "Kiss Me Kiss Your Baby" and it although failed to make an impression in the UK, it became a big hit in Europe, reaching Number one in Belgium and Number two in the Netherlands as well as top 10 placings in other countries. Brotherhood of Man toured extensively in Europe, honing their stage act and harmonies, while Hiller, Sheriden and Lee worked on composing songs for their second album. Among them was a song Sheriden had largely written called "Save Your Kisses for Me".

=== Eurovision victory ===
In early 1976, Hiller was keen for Brotherhood of Man to make an impact in the UK and decided to put "Save Your Kisses for Me" forward to the A Song for Europe competition. This year saw a change to the contest in that, since 1964, one specific artist had performed all the songs (e.g. Cliff Richard, Olivia Newton-John, Lulu, etc.), but 1976 saw the return to the format in which any artist was eligible to enter. "Save Your Kisses for Me" made it to the final twelve songs and on 25 February, Brotherhood of Man took the title, beating the second placed act, Co-Co by two points. Now signed to Pye Records, "Save Your Kisses for Me" was released as a single in March and hit the No.1 spot two weeks before the Contest final. On 3 April, the Eurovision Song Contest 1976 was staged in the Netherlands and Brotherhood of Man performed the song, dressed in red, white and black with simple choreography devised by Guy Lutman. "Save Your Kisses for Me" took the title with an overwhelming victory. As manager Hiller stated;

"..."Kiss Me Kiss Your Baby" was a hit all over Europe in '75. I firmly believe it opened the door for us a year later and helped us do well because they knew us – every weekend we'd travel to do TV spots in France, Belgium, Germany and Switzerland".

The song became a major hit around the world and reached No.1 in many countries and returned the group to the US Charts. The song eventually sold six million copies worldwide and is still the highest selling Eurovision winning single ever. In the UK, it stayed at No.1 for six weeks and earned them a platinum disc. It ended up the top selling single of the year and is still one of the few UK singles to sell a million.

=== Post Eurovision success ===
The group had already recorded a second album which had been released in several countries a year previously. Following their victory, Pye released the album with "Save Your Kisses for Me" added. Entitled Love and Kisses, the album was a success in the UK, reaching the top twenty, as well as other countries, gaining a number 6 position in Norway for instance. Soon after this, a follow-up single was released. Eager to cash in on their success, Pye decided against releasing anything from the album, as the earlier material had been more soul-based than the pop they were now successful with. The group instead released "My Sweet Rosalie" – almost a carbon copy of the previous hit, although the lyrical twist was that it was about a dog, rather than a child. The song failed to chart highly, only reaching number 30 in the UK, but fared better in other countries, particularly Belgium where it made number 2. Concerned by the lack of success for the single, the record company did not release anything else in the UK for the rest of 1976, despite the fact that in Europe a new album of material was released along with singles in various countries: "I Give You My Love" in Germany, Spain and others and "New York City" in France.

Early in 1977, the group released their next single, "Oh Boy (The Mood I'm In)". The song was a change to their previous hits in that it was female-led and much more in a contemporary pop style. The song was a hit in the UK, reaching the top 10 and fared well in Europe also. The album which had been released in Europe the previous year was now released in the UK with the new single added. The album, now titled Oh Boy!, did not follow their last album into the charts however.

Their progress was cemented with the release of their next single, "Angelo". which was released in the Summer of 1977 and was an instant success. The song rose to Number one in the UK Charts and became one of the biggest hits of the year as well as ending up among the 50 best selling singles of the decade. The group were invited to appear at the 1977 Royal Variety Performance, where they elected to sing "Angelo", rather than their then current single "Highwayman". Deprived of this vital promotion, the single failed to enter the chart (although was 'bubbling under' the top 50 at the time). It did however become a top 20 hit in both the Netherlands and Belgium. An accompanying album Images, similarly failed in the UK chart. During October the group undertook a national tour, culminating as headliners at a concert at the London Palladium and were awarded with gold discs at an after party. The show garnered a very positive review in industry magazine Music Week.

The group moved on into 1978 with the release of "Figaro", which brought them back into vogue and became their third UK Number one single. In May "Beautiful Lover" was released became another hit, reaching the UK top twenty, and spending three months in the charts. An album was released soon after, B for Brotherhood. The record company took no chances with this album, given the failure of their previous two, and so with a TV advertising campaign, the album entered the UK Charts, eventually peaking at number 18 – their most successful album so far.

As the year drew to a close another single, "Middle of the Night" was released along with a greatest hits compilation, Twenty Greatest. Apart from featuring all their own hits and a smattering of album tracks and new songs, the group re-recorded both "United We Stand" and "Where are You Going to My Love" for the album. Twenty Greatest became Brotherhood of Man's most successful album, reaching Number six in the UK Charts and spending fifteen weeks in the top 75.

=== Chart decline ===
1979 saw the group going into decline as the hits dried up. Three singles released in the first six months of the year all failed to make the charts as did their next album, Higher Than High. This was despite regular TV appearances and radio play, although the group remained popular on the live circuit.". As Pye Records were due to fold at the end of the year, one more album was released in December to fulfill their contract. The album Singing a Song was made up of unreleased songs mixed with new material, but no singles were released from the collection.

Manager Tony Hiller set up his own record company in 1980, Dazzle Records. Brotherhood of Man released the first single on the label, "Honey Don't Throw Our Love Away" which also did not chart, nor did the follow-up, a cover of the 1960s hit "Will You Love Me Tomorrow". An album was recorded but was only released in Australasia. Towards the end of the year, the group were offered a deal with Warwick Records to make an album of cover versions. Released in November, Sing 20 Number One Hits was the group's take on 20 number one UK hits from recent years. The album was a hit, peaking at No.14 – their biggest chart success for two years. The album remained in the top 50 for two months and was awarded a gold disc for sales of over 100,000. Keen to release a follow-up, Warwick offered them a double album deal the following year. Released as a buy one get one free package, 20 Disco Greats / 20 Love Songs – again, a collection of recent chart hits, came out in late 1981. This album did not match the success of the first and missed the UK Charts. Tracks from these albums appear frequently on CD releases of the group, interspersed with their own hit singles.

In early 1982, Sheriden opted to leave the group to study for a degree in music. Hiller took on 28-year-old Barry Upton, an up-and-coming songwriter. Upton was later to write hits for many artists including Sonia and Steps.

The previous year, the UK had won the Eurovision Song Contest (the first time since Brotherhood of Man) with the two-boy/two-girl pop act Bucks Fizz. Within twelve months they had chalked up three number one singles and, encouraged by their popularity, Hiller set about reviving Brotherhood of Man's fortunes. In 1982, Brotherhood of Man signed a deal with EMI in the hope that the new pop revival would encompass them. Armed with a new single, "Lightning Flash", written by Hiller, Lee, and Upton, the group were relaunched with a new contemporary image and sound. The song only reached No. 67 in the summer of 1982, but it was their first single to chart in nearly four years. A follow-up, "Cry Baby Cry", failed to capitalise on this, but nevertheless, the group began working on a new album.

In 1983, the songwriting team of Hiller, Lee, and Upton entered a song for the A Song for Europe competition. Their composition, "When the Kissing Stops", made it to the final eight, but although initially tempted, the group decided not to perform the number themselves ("We all agreed it would be better to be remembered as winners, and we couldn't bear to lose!" remembers Sandra Stevens). Hiller formed a male/female trio under the name Rubic to represent the song on 24 March 1983. The group lost out to another male/female trio, Sweet Dreams, and ended up in fifth place. Despite its failure, Brotherhood of Man recorded the song and chose it as their next single. Released in the summer of 1983, alongside their new album, Lightning Flash, neither record made the UK Chart and this brought to an end their contract with EMI. "When the Kissing Stops" remains Brotherhood of Man's final single release.

Brotherhood of Man continued to perform in concert throughout the UK and Europe, but less than a year later the group decided to split. Many of the cabaret venues they had been playing had closed and were unhappy with the night club gigs they were doing. They were offered a summer season in Blackpool and each decided they didn't want to go ahead with it. This ended their twelve-year working relationship with Hiller.

=== Reformation ===
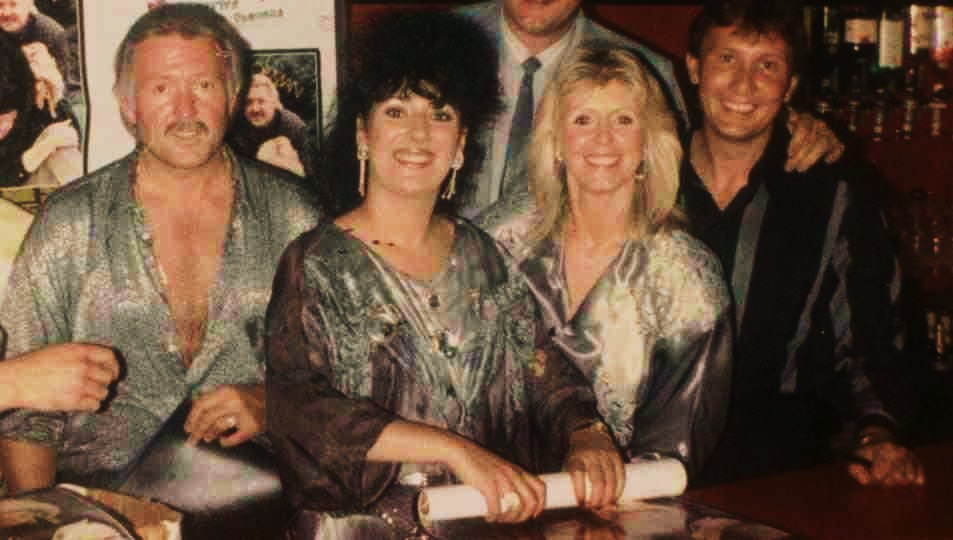
Brotherhood of Man in the late 1980s

In 1985, Brotherhood of Man reunited for a one-off TV appearance and they discussed getting back together. Over the next year, and now back with Sheriden in place of Upton, the group formed their own management company and begin performing again. In late 1986, the group were back on the live circuit, but decided against attempting a chart comeback.

In 1990, Martin Lee got together with songwriters Paul Curtis and David Kane to compose a musical based on The Butterfly Children books by Angela and Pat Mills. The musical had its world premiere at the Mitchell Theatre in Glasgow, to open the 1990 Glasgow City of Culture and ran for a month and was performed by the Mitchell Theatre for Youth. Just three months later, the show transferred to the larger Kings Theatre in Glasgow and ran for two weeks. The show transferred in late 1992 to London's West End. Brotherhood of Man recorded the songs themselves and the nineteen track collection, available on cassette only, was available to buy at the theatre. The album was never commercially released, although some tracks did make it onto tie-in cassettes to go with the books a few years later. The Butterfly Children, essentially a children's show, featured many differing styles of music from rap to rock and country and western to the more familiar pop the group were known for. The show's run ended after a short season, and has not been performed since.

In 1991, the group went back into the recording studio and made an album of re recorded hits and some new material with Dutch producer Eddy Ouwens. Not only was this their first recording for eight years, but it was their first without Hiller. The album remains unreleased in the UK, but was released in Spain under the title Grandes Exitos and in some other countries as The Golden Hits of Brotherhood of Man.

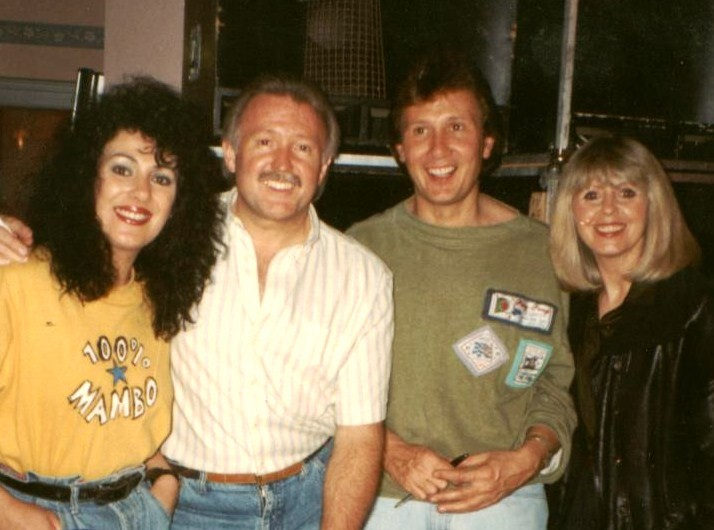
Brotherhood of Man in the 1990s. Left to right: Nicky Stevens, Martin Lee, Lee Sheriden, Sandra Stevens

Throughout the nineties the group continued to perform live around the world in TV, concert and in cabaret and in 1997, they recorded another album, based on their live show. Again, the album contained re-recordings of their hits as well as cover versions that they perform in concert, such as "1999" by Prince and "Juke Box Hero" by Foreigner. The album contained one new song, the title track "Greenhouse", rescued from the 1991 sessions. Like the previous album, this was never commercially released and was only available to buy at their shows.

As the 2000s dawned, the group went into semi-retirement and cut back on touring. However, in 2002, they devised a new live show based on their roots in the 1970s. Entitled The Seventies Story, the show comprised a trip through the decade, with the group performing well known songs from each year along with a narration of contemporary events. The group returned to the studio and recorded an album of the show's songs. Again, this album was not released in shops, but was available on CD at the show's venues. The tracks did get a general release later on however on various compilation albums. In 2004, the first Brotherhood of Man DVD was released, featuring TV performances of many of their singles.

The group continued to do occasional shows with both The Seventies Story and with their own material. They also teamed up with the current incarnation of Bucks Fizz and together they performed as a two-part show. They frequently played to sold-out houses, The Seventies Story being particularly successful in receiving good reviews.

Brotherhood of Man found themselves in demand on both the Nostalgia and Eurovision circuit. They appeared a number of times at London's G-A-Y theatre and regularly appeared on TV both in the UK and abroad, especially around Eurovision time each year. In 2006, they appeared at the 50th anniversary of the Eurovision Song Contest gala held in Denmark, where they were voted in the top 5 Eurovision songs of all time – the highest of any UK entry.

In 2009, Cherry Red Records released the first four albums by the Eurovision line up as two double CDs. This was the first time these albums were available on CD. The group experienced a surprise chart success in May 2019, when a compilation album, Gold reached No.29.

The group announced their retirement from touring on 24 December 2022, having last performed live in October 2020. However, they noted that "the four of us are still together" Long-time member Martin Lee died in September 2024.

== Members ==
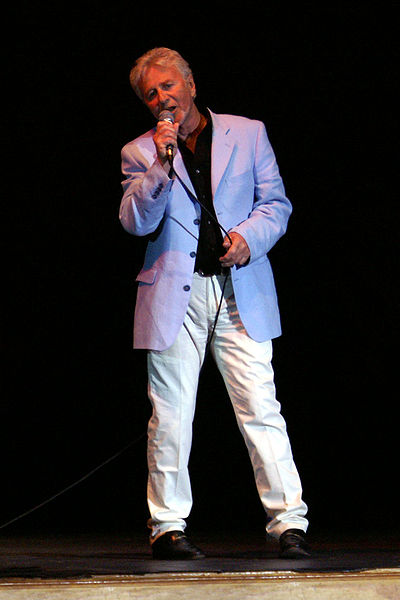
Tony Burrows in concert. Taken on 17 May 2008.

=== Brotherhood of Man I (1969–1972) ===
- John Goodison (1969–1971; died 1988)
- Tony Burrows (1969–1970)
- Roger Greenaway (1969–1971)
- Sue Glover (1969–1972)
- Sunny Leslie (1969–1972)
- Hal Atkinson (1971–1972)
- Russell Stone (1971–1972; died 2024)

=== Brotherhood of Man II (1972–2020) ===
- Martin Lee (1972–2020; died 2024)
- Lee Sheriden (1972–1981, 1986–2020)
- Nicky Stevens (1972–2020)
- Sandra Stevens (1973–2020)
- Barry Upton (1982–1984)

== Discography ==
Studio albums

- United We Stand (Deram, 1970)
- We're the Brotherhood of Man (Deram, 1972)
- Good Things Happening (Dawn, 1974)
- Love and Kisses (Pye, 1976)
- Oh Boy! (Pye, 1977)
- Images (Pye, 1977)
- B for Brotherhood (Pye, 1978)
- Higher Than High (Pye, 1979)
- Singing a Song (Pye, 1979)
- Good Fortune (Dazzle, 1980)
- Sing 20 Number One Hits (Warwick, 1980)
- 20 Disco Greats / 20 Love Songs (Warwick, 1981)
- Lightning Flash (EMI, 1983)
- The Butterfly Children (1992)
- Greenhouse (1997)
- The Seventies Story (2002)

Awards and achievements
Preceded by (Netherlands) Teach-In with "Ding-A-Dong"	Winner of the Eurovision Song Contest; 1976	Succeeded by (France) Marie Myriam with "L'oiseau et l'enfant"
Preceded by The Shadows with "Let Me Be the One"	UK in the Eurovision Song Contest; 1976	Succeeded by Lynsey de Paul and Mike Moran with "Rock Bottom"
