= Figaro (song) =

Single by Brotherhood of Man

from the album "B for Brotherhood"
- B-side: "You Can Say That Again"
- Released: 6 January 1978
- Genre: Pop, disco
- Length: 2.57
- Label: Pye Records
- Songwriter: Tony Hiller / Lee Sheriden / Martin Lee
- Producer: Tony Hiller

Brotherhood of Man singles chronology
"Highwayman" (1977)	"Figaro" (1978)	"Beautiful Lover" (1978)

"Figaro" is a song by British pop group Brotherhood of Man. It was released as a single in January 1978 and became the group's third and final number one hit in the UK.

== Background ==
By 1978, Brotherhood of Man had experienced a certain amount of chart success in both the UK and Europe, notably so with "Save Your Kisses For Me" and "Angelo". Following this, came the failure of their next single "Highwayman" (released in late 1977). In January 1978, they released this song, which borrowed the title-idea from their previous No.1 "Angelo". The song became a No.1 hit in February, spending one week on top of the charts in the UK and becoming one of the twenty best selling singles of the year. This was to be Brotherhood of Man's final No.1 single. It was awarded a gold disc by the BPI in February 1978. The single featured a track, "You Can Say That Again", from their previous album on the B-side, while in Canada, a Special Disco Mix of the A-side was released on 12" single.

"Figaro" was written by band members Lee Sheriden and Martin Lee along with their manager Tony Hiller, who also produced the track. The lead vocals are sung jointly by members Sandra Stevens and Nicky Stevens. The distinctive opening drum roll on the song was performed by Clem Cattini of the 1960s band The Tornados.

The song tells of a (presumably) Spanish cabaret singer who is intent on gaining the interest of young ladies. As co-writer Hiller stated; My daughter had just come back from vacation in Spain and was full of stories about the young waiters trying to romance the young girls".

"Figaro" became a hit in many European countries, including Ireland, where it was also a No.1 hit. The song featured on the group's album B for Brotherhood, and was followed up by top 20 hit "Beautiful Lover". "Figaro" went on to be voted best song of the first half of 1978 by readers of Look-in magazine and best song of the year by viewers of TV's Magpie. A cover version was recorded for the Top of the Pops album series, appearing on Volume 63 and The Best of 1978.

== Track listing ==
- 7" single
1. "Figaro" (Tony Hiller / Lee Sheriden / Martin Lee) – 2:57
2. "You Can Say That Again" (Hiller / Sheriden / Lee) – 3:22
- 12" (Canada only)
1. "Figaro (Special Disco Mix)" – 4:24
2. "You Can Say That Again" – 3:20

== Chart performance ==
Country	Peak position
UK	1
Ireland	1
Norway	12
South Africa	12
Belgium	16
The Netherlands	28
