= Let Me Be the One (The Shadows song) =

1975 song by The Shadows

- Cover of vinyl single

Single by The Shadows
- Released: 1975
- Songwriter: Paul Curtis

Eurovision Song Contest 1975 entry
- Country: United Kingdom
- Artists: Bruce Welch; John Farrar; Hank Marvin; Brian Bennett
- As: The Shadows
- Language: English
- Composer: Paul Curtis
- Lyricist: Paul Curtis
- Conductor: Alyn Ainsworth

Finals performance
- Final result: 2nd
- Final points: 138

Entry chronology
- ◄ "Long Live Love" (1974)
- "Save Your Kisses For Me" (1976) ►

"Let Me Be the One" is a song written by Paul Curtis and performed by the band The Shadows. It represented the United Kingdom in the Eurovision Song Contest 1975.

The song was performed ninth that night. At the close of voting, it had received 138 points, placing it 2nd out of 19.

== Charts ==
Chart (1975)	Peak position
France (SNEP)	26
Ireland (IRMA)	10
Norway (VG-lista)	2
UK Singles (OCC)	12
West Germany (GfK)	47

== Personnel (studio recording) ==
- Hank Marvin – guitar and vocals
- Bruce Welch - guitar and lead vocals
- Brian Bennett – drums
- John Farrar – guitar, piano and vocals
- Alan Tarney – bass guitar
- John Fiddy – string arrangements

== Personnel (live Eurovision Song Contest & Song For Europe Appearances) ==
- Hank Marvin – guitar and vocals
- Bruce Welch - bass and lead vocals
- Brian Bennett – drums
- John Farrar – guitar and vocals
- Alan Tarney – piano

Preceded by "Long Live Love" by Olivia Newton-John	United Kingdom in the Eurovision Song Contest; 1975	Succeeded by "Save Your Kisses for Me" by Brotherhood of Man
