= Angelo (Brotherhood of Man song) =

Single by Brotherhood of Man

from the album Images
- B-side: "All Night"
- Released: 21 June 1977
- Genre: Pop
- Length: 3.15
- Label: Pye
- Songwriters: Tony Hiller; Lee Sheriden; Martin Lee
- Producer: Tony Hiller

Brotherhood of Man singles chronology
"Oh Boy (The Mood I'm In)" (1977)	"Angelo" (1977)	"Highwayman" (1977)

"Angelo" is a song by British pop group Brotherhood of Man. Released as a single in June 1977, it became the group's second UK number one hit.

== Background ==
Written by Tony Hiller, Lee Sheriden and Martin Lee and produced by Hiller, it was the band's second UK number one single (after their Eurovision winner, "Save Your Kisses for Me" the previous year), spending a single week at the top in August 1977. The song remained on the UK Chart for 12 weeks—ten of them in the top ten—and was the 9th biggest selling single of the year. It was awarded a gold disc in August 1977 by the BPI. The song also was a number one hit in Ireland, Japan and South Africa (for two weeks). "Angelo" was nominated for an Ivor Novello award for International hit of the year in 1978. It featured on the group's album Images, which was released later in the year.

The song tells of a shepherd in Mexico who falls in love with a rich girl, but he is met with resistance from her family. Both aware that her family would never allow the union, they run away together and end their lives by suicide. According to co-writer Hiller, the lyrics were based on "Romeo and Juliet—the great love story. The idea was to create a modern day Romeo and Juliet romance". The song is a moderate 117 beats per minute, and played in C Minor with the vocal range: G3-C5.

The song is sung by the two female members of the group, Sandra Stevens and Nicky Stevens, although Sandra sings the opening lines alone. "Angelo" was performed by the group at the Silver Jubilee Royal Variety Gala in November 1977 in front of Queen Elizabeth II.

UK comedy group The Barron Knights parodied this song on their "Live in Trouble" single, a top ten hit in 1977, as "Ann and Joe".

German songstress Daffi Cramer recorded her version of the song which was produced by Fritz Muschler and released on Ariola 11 620 AT in 1977.

== Track listing ==
1. "Angelo" (3:15)
2. "All Night" (2:59)

French and German version:

1. "Angelo" (3:15)
2. "Circus" (3:20)

All tracks written by Tony Hiller, Lee Sheriden and Martin Lee

== Chart performance ==
Country	Peak position
Australia	23
Belgium	2
France	70
Germany	14
Ireland	1
Japan	1
Netherlands	4
New Zealand	27
Rhodesia	1
South Africa	1
United Kingdom	1
