= Sandra Stevens =

British singer

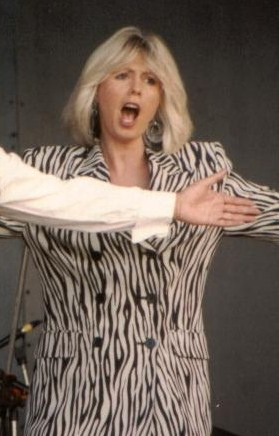

Background information
- Born: 23 November 1944 (age 81); Leeds, Yorkshire, England
- Genres: Pop
- Occupation: Singer
- Years active: 1966–present
- Formerly of: Brotherhood of Man
- Spouse: Martin Lee (m. 1979; died 2024)

Sandra Stevens (born 23 November 1944) is an English singer and a member of the pop group Brotherhood of Man.

== Early career ==
Sandra Stevens first entered into a singing career in the 1960s when she joined the club band, The Track (who then changed their name to The Nocturnes). The group was formed by drummer Ross Mitchell and among the six members Stevens sang vocals alongside Eve Graham (later of The New Seekers). Based in Manchester, the band played local clubs, performing pop hits of the day such as "The Loco-Motion" and "Da Doo Ron Ron". In early 1967 Stevens decided to leave the group and was replaced by Lyn Paul (also later of The New Seekers). Over the next few years she sang with the big bands of Joe Loss and Ken MacKintosh and also joined another group, Jason Flocks. Also at this time Stevens was working during the day as a shorthand typist.

== Brotherhood of Man ==
In 1973, Stevens was performing as the resident singer at Wakefield Theatre Club when she came to the attention of Tony Hiller who was looking to recruit a new singer for Brotherhood of Man – a group he was managing. The group were currently performing as a trio (Martin Lee, Lee Sheriden and Nicky Stevens (no relation)) and had released two singles. Stevens took the two singles and listened to them, immediately she was taken by the sound and was keen to join them. In late 1973 Brotherhood of Man became a four-piece with Sandra sharing lead vocals.

It was not long before the group released their first single featuring the new line up. In January 1974 "When Love Catches Up on You" was released on Dawn Records and by the end of the year they had scored a European hit with "Lady" and had released an album.

Over the next few years, Stevens enjoyed great success with Brotherhood of Man throughout the world. In 1975 they scored their first number one single and a year later they won the Eurovision Song Contest with the song "Save Your Kisses for Me". The song made No.1 in the UK as well as many other countries and this was followed by two more UK chart toppers, "Angelo" and "Figaro". Although Hiller, Sheriden and Lee wrote the bulk of their material, Stevens is credited as a co-writer on one of their songs: "Let's Love Together", the B-side to "Save Your Kisses for Me". In over 100 songs recorded, this is the only time that one of the female members of the group received a writing credit.

Stevens continued with Brotherhood of Man, recording lead vocals for many of their biggest hits and performing live with them through the decades. The group continued with the same line-up. They appeared in concert and on television, until 20 October 2020, when they retired from touring.

== Personal life ==
During the peak of the group's success, Stevens was in a relationship with fellow band member Martin Lee and moved in with him. Due to the young age of many of the group's fans, this was kept largely a secret. Stevens and Lee later married in 1979 until Lee's death in 2024. Stevens was keen on swimming and playing tennis.

Awards and achievements
| Preceded by (Netherlands) Teach-In with "Ding-A-Dong" | Winner of the Eurovision Song Contest; 1976 (as part of Brotherhood of Man) | Succeeded by (France) Marie Myriam with "L'oiseau et l'enfant" |
| Preceded by The Shadows with "Let Me Be the One" | UK in the Eurovision Song Contest; 1976 (as part of Brotherhood of Man) | Succeeded by Lynsey de Paul and Mike Moran with "Rock Bottom" |
