= Save Your Kisses for Me =

1976 song by Brotherhood of Man

Single by Brotherhood of Man

from the album Love and Kisses
- B-side: "Let's Love Together"
- Released: 5 March 1976
- Genre: Pop; MOR; schlager
- Length: 3:06
- Label: Pye
- Songwriters: Tony Hiller; Lee Sheriden; Martin Lee
- Producer: Tony Hiller

Brotherhood of Man singles chronology
"Kiss Me, Kiss Your Baby" (1975)	"Save Your Kisses for Me" (1976)	"My Sweet Rosalie" (1976)

Music video
- Save Your Kisses For Me on YouTube

Eurovision Song Contest 1976 entry
- Country: United Kingdom
- Artists: Martin Lee; Nicky Stevens; Sandra Stevens; Lee Sheriden
- As: Brotherhood of Man
- Language: English
- Composers: Tony Hiller; Lee Sheriden; Martin Lee
- Lyricists: Tony Hiller; Lee Sheriden; Martin Lee
- Conductor: Alyn Ainsworth

Finals performance
- Final result: 1st
- Final points: 164

Entry chronology
- ◄ "Let Me Be the One" (1975)
- "Rock Bottom" (1977) ►

Official performance video
- "Save Your Kisses for Me" on YouTube

"Save Your Kisses for Me" is a song recorded by British group Brotherhood of Man, written by Tony Hiller with band members Lee Sheriden and Martin Lee. It represented the United Kingdom in the Eurovision Song Contest 1976 held in The Hague, winning the contest.

The song became a worldwide hit, reaching No. 1 in many countries, including the UK, where it became the biggest-selling song of the year. Overall, it remains one of the biggest-selling Eurovision winners ever, and the biggest such seller in the UK.

== Background ==
=== Conception ===
"Save Your Kisses for Me" was originally written by Brotherhood of Man's member Lee Sheriden in August 1974. On bringing the song in to the next songwriting session, others thought that the title was clumsy and reworked it into "Oceans of Love". Sheriden was unhappy with the changes and the song was shelved. A year later when it came to coming up with songs for their next album, they discovered that they needed one more song and Sheriden again put forth "Save Your Kisses for Me". This time it was accepted, as he later recalled:

"I'd had a year to think about it, I knew exactly what I wanted to do on the arrangement, the glockenspiel on the beginning and the big 12-string acoustic guitar and the strings, and then came the day to record the song... It was about midnight and I sang it and it went well. I could see everyone behind the glass panel getting excited and I thought great, they all really like the song, and as I finished I was waiting for them to press the button so they could speak to me and say 'great, we've got a hit' or whatever, and the person pressing it said: 'Lee, we think Martin should sing this song'. But I didn't mind because Martin came in and sung it to perfection."

The song's lyrics described the gently conflicted emotions of a man leaving his loved one in the morning as he goes to work. The song's final line provided a twist that the aforementioned loved one was his three-year-old daughter.

=== Eurovision ===
Soon after, manager Tony Hiller was keen for the group to try for Eurovision, as the British Broadcasting Corporation (BBC) had changed its selection rules. Up till then, a singer was internally selected, but for 1976 it was opened up to different singers to enter their own songs. Brotherhood of Man put forward "Save Your Kisses for Me" and the BBC accepted it as one of the twelve finalists.

On 25 February 1976, "Save Your Kisses for Me" competed in A Song for Europe 1976, the national final organized by the BBC to select its song and performer for the 21st edition of the Eurovision Song Contest. The song won the competition, beating second-placed "Wake Up" by Co-Co by just two points, and becoming the British entry, and Brotherhood of Man the performers, for Eurovision. The song was released as a single and reached number one in the UK Singles Chart, two weeks before Eurovision.

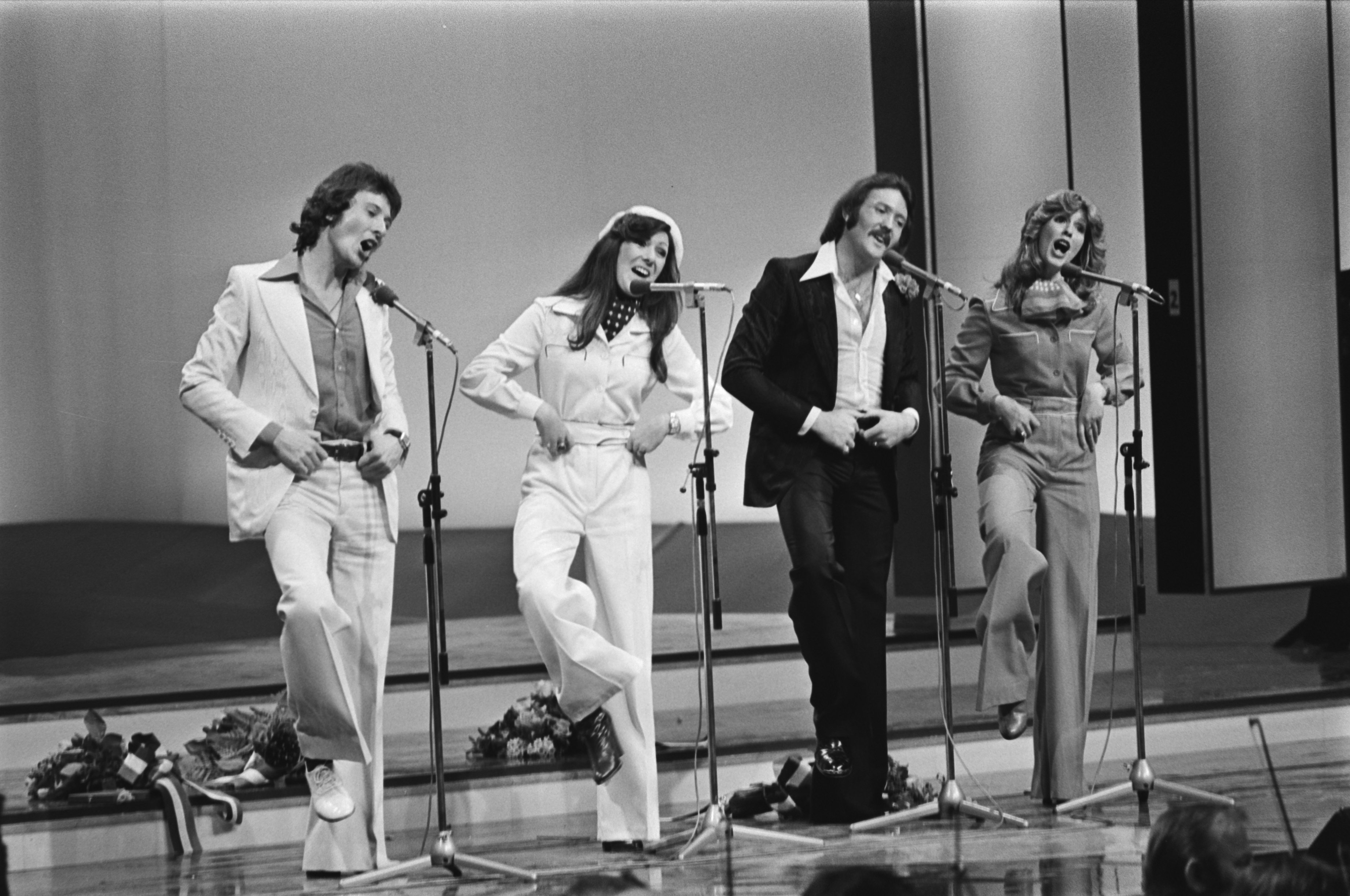
Brotherhood of Man performing their winning reprise at Eurovision.

On 3 April 1976, the Eurovision Song Contest was held at the Nederlands Congresgebouw in The Hague hosted by Nederlandse Omroep Stichting (NOS), and broadcast live throughout the continent. Brotherhood of Man performed "Save Your Kisses for Me" first on the evening, preceding Switzerland's "Djambo, Djambo" by Peter, Sue and Marc. The performance consisted of the two male singers wearing black and white suits, and the two females wearing white and red jumpsuits with matching berets, standing still and singing with minor arm and leg choreography. Alyn Ainsworth conducted the live orchestra in the performance of the British entry.

At the close of voting, the song had received 164 points –being awarded the maximum twelve points by seven countries–, beating the second-placed French entry with 147 points, and being the second consecutive Eurovision winner that was performed first in the order of presentation.

=== Aftermath ===
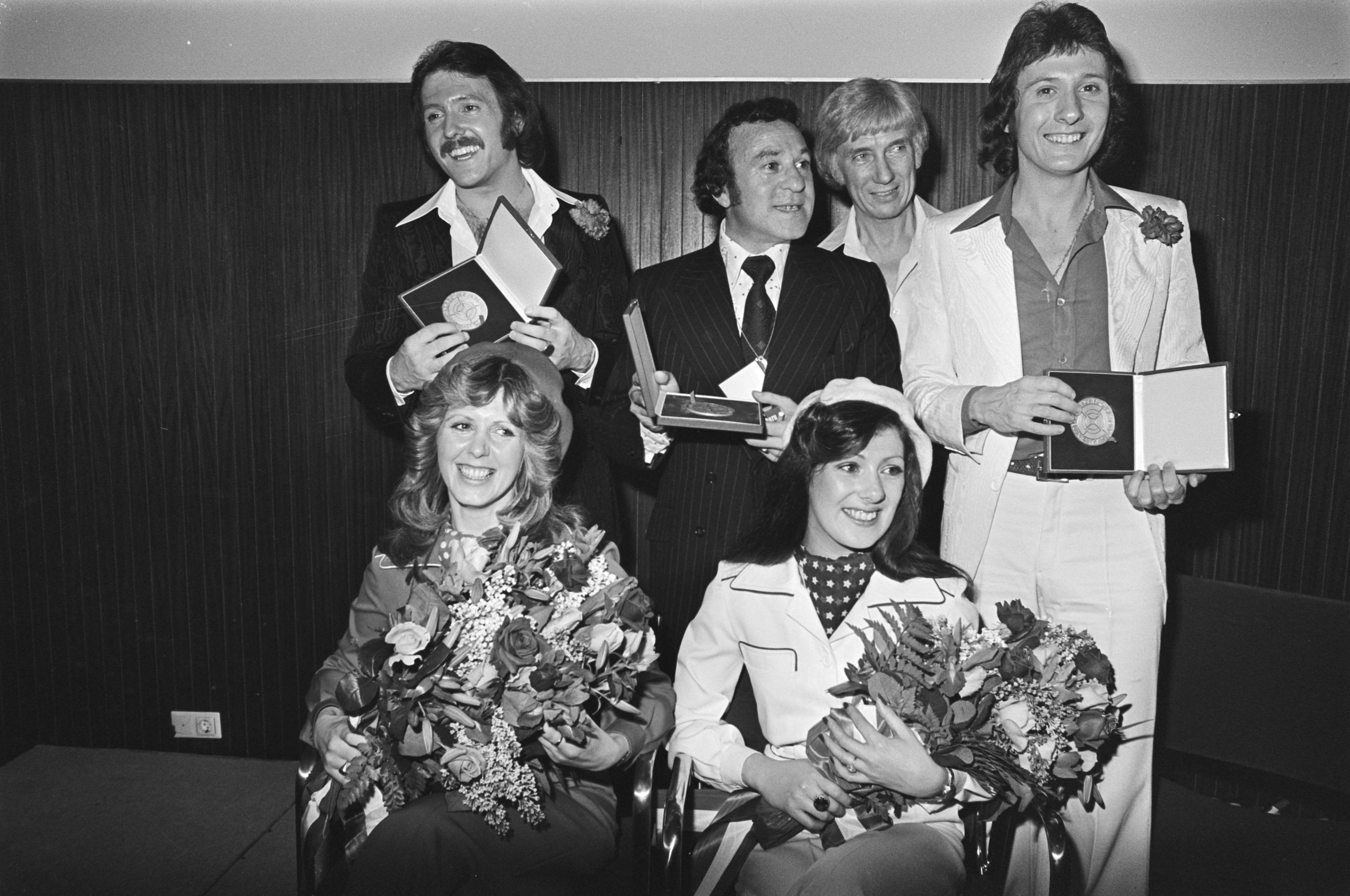
Brotherhood of Man, Hiller, and Ainsworth just after winning, with the songwriters holding their medals.

After winning the contest, the song reached No.1 in many countries across Europe and eventually sold more than six million copies. In the UK, it stayed at No. 1 for six weeks and was certified platinum by the BPI in May 1976, becoming the biggest selling single of the year. The song also hit number one in a number of other countries, such as France where it remained in the peak position for five weeks. In the United States, the song was a moderate pop hit –No. 27 on the Billboard Hot 100– but went all the way to No. 1 on the Easy Listening chart; it would be the only hit the band –in its post-1973 incarnation– would have in the US. The song is reported to be the biggest selling single for a winning entry in the history of the contest. It also still holds the record for the highest relative score under the voting system introduced in 1975 –which has been used in every contest since–, with an average of 9.65 points per jury. It is still one of the best-selling singles of all time in the UK, with sales of over a million copies. It also won four ASCAP awards in 1977.

At the same time as the single was at No.1, the group released their latest album; Love and Kisses, which featured "Save Your Kisses for Me". The group followed this up with the similarly themed "My Sweet Rosalie", which was also a hit around Europe. The group continued to score hits in the UK, with two more chart toppers in the next two years; however, this was not the case in the United States, where "Save Your Kisses for Me" was the group's final chart entry –and only one under this lineup–.

Brotherhood of Man performed the song in the Eurovision twenty-fifth anniversary show Songs of Europe held on 22 August 1981 in Mysen. The song was one of fourteen songs chosen by Eurovision fans and a European Broadcasting Union (EBU) reference group, from among the 992 songs that had ever participated in the contest, to participate in the fiftieth anniversary competition Congratulations: 50 Years of the Eurovision Song Contest held on 22 October 2005 in Copenhagen. It was re-enacted by the group along with twelve dancers dressed in matching red, white, and black costumes with briefcases and a live orchestra as the original footage was shown in the background. It came fifth in the final voting. They also performed the song in the Eurovision sixtieth anniversary show Eurovision Song Contest's Greatest Hits held on 31 March 2015 in London.

Brotherhood of Man have re-recorded the song twice as well as releasing a Spanish version titled "Tus besos son para mi" as a single in 1991.

== Track listing ==
1. "Save Your Kisses for Me" (Tony Hiller / Lee Sheriden / Martin Lee) 3:06
2. "Let's Love Together" (Hiller / Sheriden / Lee / Sandra Stevens) 2:57

== Chart performance ==
=== Weekly charts ===
Chart (1976)	Peak position
Argentina	20
Australia (Kent Music Report)	5
Austria (Ö3 Austria Top 40)	3
Belgium (VRT Top 30)	1
Canada (RPM)	61
Danish Album Charts	1
Finland (Suomen virallinen lista)	1
France (SNEP)	1
Germany (Media Control Charts)	2
Ireland (Irish Singles Chart)	1
Israel (Israeli Singles Chart)	1
Italy (Musica e dischi)	36
Netherlands (Single Top 100)	1
Netherlands (Dutch Top 40)	1
New Zealand (Recorded Music NZ)	9
Norway (VG-lista)	1
Portugal	10
South Africa (Springbok Radio)	4
Spain (Promusicae)	1
Sweden (Sverigetopplistan)	6
Switzerland (Schweizer Hitparade)	2
UK Singles (Official Charts)	1
US Billboard Hot 100	27
US Adult Contemporary (Billboard) then called Easy Listening	1

2026 weekly chart performance
Chart (2026)	Peak position
Israel International Airplay (Media Forest)	15

=== Year-end charts ===
Chart (1976)	Peak position
Australia (Kent Music Report)	44
Austria	18
Germany	19
Switzerland	9
UK	1
US Easy Listening	41

=== Certifications ===
Region	Certification	Certified units/sales
France (SNEP)	Gold	500,000^{*}
United Kingdom (BPI)	Platinum	1,000,000^{^}
^{*} Sales figures based on certification alone.^{^} Shipments figures based on certification alone.

== Legacy ==
=== Margo Smith version ===
"Save Your Kisses for Me"

Single by Margo Smith

from the album Song Bird
- B-side: "I'm About to Do It Again"
- Released: May 1976
- Recorded: Columbia Recording Studio; Nashville, Tennessee, US
- Genre: Country
- Length: 3:04
- Label: Warner Bros.
- Songwriters: Tony Hiller; Lee Sheriden; Martin Lee
- Producer: Norro Wilson

Margo Smith singles chronology
"Meet Me Later" (1975)	"Save Your Kisses for Me" (1976)	"Take My Breath Away" (1976)

"Save Your Kisses for Me" was notably covered by Margo Smith in 1976. Her version of the song was recorded in a country format and released as a single via Warner Bros. Records.

Smith cut "Save Your Kisses for Me" in her second studio session for Warner Bros. Records. The session took place at the Columbia Recording Studio, located in Nashville, Tennessee, United States. The session was produced by Norro Wilson. An additional session in March would yield songs that would later make up her second studio album Songbird. Smith's cover version of the song was generally met with positive reception. Kurt Wolff of Country Music: The Rough Guide would later call the song one of the "sizeable hits" Smith would enjoy on the radio between 1976 and 1978. Robert K. Oermann and Mary A. Bufwack of Finding Her Voice: Women in Country Music stated the song represented Smith's "wholesome, homey image". This can be seen in Smith's other hits including "Take My Breath Away", "Don't Break the Heart That Loves You", and "It Only Hurts for a Little While". Two years after the song's release, Smith would identify more as a sexually charged performer.

"Save Your Kisses for Me" was released as a single in May 1976 via Warner Bros. Records. It was Smith's first single issued by the label, after previously recording for Sugar Hill and 20th Century Fox. The song reached the tenth position on the Billboard Hot Country Singles chart in the fall of 1976. The single became Smith's second top-ten single on the country chart and would start a series of major hits for her. In July 1976, the single was released on Smith's first studio album for Warner Bros. Records entitled Song Bird. Margo Smith's version of the song is the most successful cover of "Save Your Kisses for Me" to date.

==== Track listing ====
1. "Save Your Kisses for Me" – 3:04
2. "I'm About to Do It Again" – 2:32

==== Chart performance ====
Weekly charts

Chart (1976)	Peak position
US Hot Country Singles (Billboard)	10

Year-end chart

Chart (1976)	Peak position
US Country	60

=== Bobby Vinton version ===
Bobby Vinton had a Billboard top 100 hit in the same year with his version.

Chart (1976)	Peak position
Canada (RPM Adult Contemporary)	41
Canada (RPM Top Singles)	98
US (Billboard Hot 100)	75
US (Cash Box Top 100)	105

=== Other covers ===
In 2019, the Israeli singer Eden Alene released it as her debut single. She was due to represent Israel in the Eurovision Song Contest 2020, however she did it in 2021 instead. Icelandic musician Daði Freyr, who was also meant to compete in the Eurovision Song Contest 2020 and did so instead in 2021, included it in his second edition of JúróDaði, a video in which he covers past Eurovision songs.

== See also ==
- 1976 in country music
- List of European number-one hits of 1976
- List of Dutch Top 40 number-one singles of 1976
- List of number-one hits of 1976 (France)
- List of number-one singles of 1976 (Ireland)
- List of number-one hits in Norway
- List of number-one singles from the 1970s (UK)
- List of number-one adult contemporary singles of 1976 (U.S.)

Preceded by "Ding-a-dong" by Teach-In	Eurovision Song Contest winners 1976	Succeeded by "L'Oiseau et l'Enfant" by Marie Myriam
