= Nicky Stevens =

Welsh singer (born 1949)

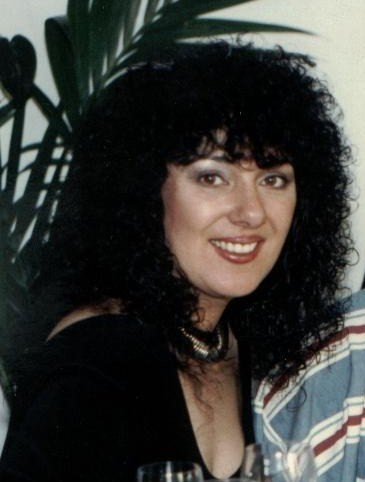
- Stevens in 1991

Background information
- Born: Helen Maria Thomas; 3 December 1949 (age 76); Carmarthen, Wales
- Genres: Pop
- Occupation: Singer
- Years active: 1967–present
- Formerly of: Brotherhood of Man

Nicky Stevens (born Helen Maria Thomas in Carmarthen, Wales, 3 December 1949) is a Welsh singer, best known as a member of the pop group Brotherhood of Man. To date she is the only Welsh person to have won the Eurovision Song Contest.

== Early career ==
Nicky Stevens began singing at an early age. At the age of four she was singing in a chapel in Carmarthen, and following lessons eventually joined the Hywel Girls Choir. She also studied classical music as a singer and pianist. At the age of 16 she held a residency in Swansea's Townsman nightclub. During this period she also took on a job as a telephone operator. This lasted for nine months and is the only job she has ever had outside the entertainment business. She later toured the Continent as a singer, performing in night clubs. Following this she went on to tour South Africa as well as clubs around the UK. She also appeared on stage as a support act for the likes of Neil Sedaka, Norman Wisdom and Little and Large in the early 1970s. Stevens worked mainly performing popular songs and found it a struggle at first to adapt her vocals from her classical roots.

== Brotherhood of Man ==
In 1972, while working as a session singer and trying to secure a record deal as a solo artist, Stevens came to the attention of Tony Hiller, who was looking to recruit new members for his group Brotherhood of Man. Hiller was manager and songwriter for the group, but they had recently disbanded and keen to keep the name alive, which was still in demand for television work, he recruited Stevens alongside Martin Lee and Lee Sheriden. In 1973, signed to Deram Records, they released their first single, "Happy Ever After".

Later in the year another female singer was added to the group, Sandra Stevens (no relation) and as a four-piece, Brotherhood of Man went on to enjoy great success around the world. Scoring their first hit in 1974 and first No.1 the year after, the group entered and won the 1976 Eurovision Song Contest with the song "Save Your Kisses for Me". For the next three years, the group regularly hit the chart and scored two more No.1 singles in the UK, "Angelo" and "Figaro".

In addition to singing, Stevens is a pianist, and performed the piano accompaniment to an otherwise a cappella recording of "Send in the Clowns" in 1978, which was featured on the band's Twenty Greatest album.

In 1984, while the group was on a two-year break, Stevens joined The Vernons Girls and performed with them at live shows. She also did much recording work at this time on jingles and demos for songwriters. In 1988, Stevens recorded some songs with Dutch singer Albert West. In the early 1990s she also recorded some songs with British rock band Aslan (Note: Not to be confused with the Irish rock band of the same name.) as the lead singer.

Stevens continued to perform with Brotherhood of Man in its most famous line-up, taking in UK tours and television appearances throughout Europe until October 2020 when they retired from touring. In November 2013, Stevens was the subject of a documentary Time of Your Life on ITV Wales talking about her career and early life growing up in a musical environment in Carmarthen. The documentary celebrated the fact that she is the only Welsh person to have won the Eurovision Song Contest.

During the Coronavirus pandemic, Stevens helped out at a nursing home in Ferndown, where she offered music therapy, ran arts & crafts sessions and spent one-to-one time with individual residents. Upon her departure, residents and staff gathered to perform their own version of "Save Your Kisses for Me", with amended lyrics to thank her for her time there.

== Personal life ==
Nicky Stevens was the second child of Ossie and Blodwen Thomas. Her father had been a musician and was killed in a road accident in 1974.

In June 1976, Stevens, who lived in Watford at the time married the group's guitarist, Alan Johnson at the Watford Registry Office. They divorced at the end of the 1980s. In May 1993, she got married again to an American man, fourteen years her junior called Brett. Within a year however, they had separated and then divorced.

In the 1990s, Stevens lived in Sturminster Marshall, but as of 2011 lives in Corfe Mullen, both in Dorset. Since moving to Dorset, Stevens has begun appearing in Christmas pantomimes including Cinderella at Weymouth Pavilion in 2013 and Snow White and the Seven Dwarves at the Tivoli, Wimborne in 2014.

== Notes ==
Awards and achievements
Preceded by (Netherlands) Teach-In with "Ding-A-Dong"	Winner of the Eurovision Song Contest; 1976 (as part of Brotherhood of Man)	Succeeded by (France) Marie Myriam with "L'oiseau et l'enfant"
Preceded by The Shadows with "Let Me Be the One"	UK in the Eurovision Song Contest; 1976 (as part of Brotherhood of Man)	Succeeded by Lynsey de Paul and Mike Moran with "Rock Bottom"
