= Lee Sheriden =

British singer

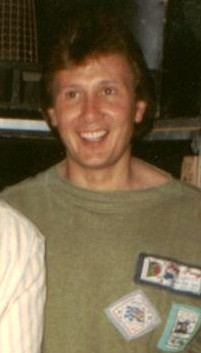

Background information
- Born: Roger Pritchard; 11 April 1944 (age 82); Horfield, Bristol, England
- Genre: Pop
- Occupations: Singer, songwriter
- Instruments: Vocals, guitar
- Years active: 1973–present
- Formerly of: Brotherhood of Man

Lee Sheriden (born Roger Pritchard; 11 April 1944) is an English singer, best known as a member of pop group Brotherhood of Man.

== Early career ==
As a child, Roger Pritchard learned the piano and later took up the guitar when he joined his first group at the age of 14. This group appeared on the television talent show Carroll Levis Discoveries but he later found his way into other groups. After he left school he became a resident musician at the Top Rank Ballroom in Bristol (now renamed The Works) for four years. In the early 1970s he embarked on a career as a songwriter. This brought him to the attention of Tony Hiller, who was looking for songwriters for his publishing company. Sheriden signed up with Tony Hiller Music and soon after Hiller, aware that Sheriden could also sing, asked him to be a part of the new Brotherhood of Man line-up.

Sheriden agreed and along with Martin Lee and Nicky Stevens, appeared on various television and radio shows. While Sheriden released a solo single in January 1973 called "Sweetest Tasting Candy Sugar", Hiller began composing songs with Sheriden and Lee with the view to putting together an album.

In 1973 the group released two singles "Happy Ever After" and "Our World of Love", but neither charted. In late 1973 they were joined by singer Sandra Stevens and the now four-piece group secured a record deal with the Pye spin-off Dawn Records. Sheriden along with Hiller wrote the first single "When Love Catches Up on You", but it was the second release "Lady" which gained them attention by becoming a hit in Europe.

== Success in Europe ==
With an album completed and released before the end of 1974, the group scored their next big hit with "Kiss Me Kiss Your Baby". During writing sessions for their second album, Sheriden came up with a song called "Save Your Kisses for Me", which the others rejected initially. He then presented it to them again as Hiller was looking for a song to enter in the following year's Song for Europe. This time they went with it and after some rewriting the song won the contest in 1976. It went on to win the Eurovision Song Contest and became a No. 1 in many countries, selling over a million copies in the UK alone.

The writing team of Sheriden, Hiller and Lee continued for the next few years, writing hit singles and albums for the group. Sheriden himself also acted as musical director on the recordings, as he later recalled; "It was my job as musical director to go home and sit down and write the score. there were no computers and no synthesizers in those days, you had to do it the old-fashioned way and write out all the music for the orchestra." Sheriden would then spend the day in the studio working with the musicians before the other singers would come in later in the evening. . Two more UK #1s followed in the form of "Angelo" (1977) and "Figaro" (1978).

As a songwriter, Sheriden received three Ivor Novello Awards. In 1982, after the success of the group had wound down, he left the band, unwilling to sign another contract with Hiller and be tied down for another two years. He left and studied for a Degree in Music. He was replaced by Barry Upton, but it was just two years before the band split completely.

In 1986, Sheriden agreed to reunite with Martin Lee, Sandra Stevens and Nicky Stevens and the group were again touring. The line-up continued to appear regularly on television around Europe as well as performing in concert. On 23 March 2007 Sheriden took part in a charity concert as a solo act. After the show he stated that it was the only time he'd performed solo on stage. Brotherhood of Man retired from touring 20 October 2020 but have stated that "the four of us are still together".

== Personal life ==
Sheriden is married with two daughters.

At the time of his Eurovision win he was still living in Ashley Down in Bristol but moved to Hertfordshire the following year. He currently lives in Beaconsfield Buckinghamshire.

Awards and achievements
Preceded by (Netherlands) Teach-In with "Ding-A-Dong"	Winner of the Eurovision Song Contest; 1976 (as part of Brotherhood of Man)	Succeeded by (France) Marie Myriam with "L'oiseau et l'enfant"
Preceded by The Shadows with "Let Me Be the One"	UK in the Eurovision Song Contest; 1976 (as part of Brotherhood of Man)	Succeeded by Lynsey de Paul and Mike Moran with "Rock Bottom"
