= Martin Lee (singer) =

British singer (1946–2024)

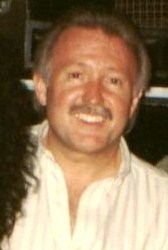

Background information
- Born: Martin Barnes; 26 November 1946; Purley, London, England
- Died: 29 September 2024 (aged 77)
- Genre: Pop
- Occupations: Singer, songwriter
- Instruments: Vocals, guitar
- Years active: 1973–2020
- Formerly of: Brotherhood of Man
- Spouse: Sandra Stevens (m. 1979)

Martin Lee (born Martin Barnes, 26 November 1946 – 29 September 2024) was an English singer, best known as a member of the pop group Brotherhood of Man.

Lee was brought into Brotherhood of Man along with Lee Sheriden, Sandra Stevens, and Nicky Stevens by band manager Tony Hiller in 1972, when its original line-up split up to pursue different music careers. The new version won the Eurovision Song Contest 1976 with their song "Save Your Kisses for Me".

Lee was married to Brotherhood of Man member Sandra Stevens.

== Early years ==
Born in Purley, London as Martin Barnes, he spent five years of his early life in Australia. His mother died when he was young and with his father, he returned to the UK. As a teenager, he had a great interest in music and after learning to play guitar he formed his first band.

Before making it big in Brotherhood of Man, Lee had already released a solo single by this time, a song called "Cry José", but it failed to gain much interest.

== Brotherhood of Man ==
In the early 1970s Lee came to the attention of songwriter and publisher Tony Hiller, while he was working as lead singer with the Johnny Howard Band. Hiller signed him up to his company, Tony Hiller Music initially as a writer. On discovering that he could sing as well, he asked him to be part of the group he managed, Brotherhood of Man. The group, that originally consisted of John Goodison and Sue and Sunny and had scored a hit in 1970 with United We Stand, had recently disbanded and Hiller was keen to put a new line-up together. Along with Lee Sheriden and Nicky Stevens and later Sandra Stevens, the new line-up was born.

Working alongside Hiller and Sheriden he began composing new songs for the group during 1972. The following year they released their first single and the year after, their first hit. Lee quickly emerged as the lead singer of the group, taking the lead on many of their songs, including that first hit "Lady".

=== Eurovision win and onwards ===
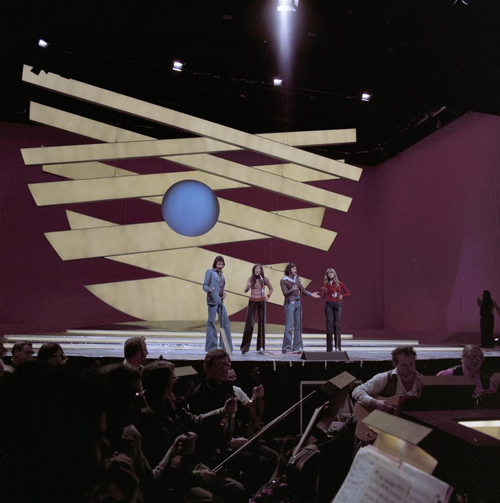
Lee, second from the right, rehearsing "Save Your Kisses for Me" in at Eurovision 1976

In 1975, Brotherhood of Man scored their first European No.1 with the song "Kiss Me Kiss Your Baby", again with a Martin Lee lead vocal. Later that year, the writing team set about composing a song they would enter for the Eurovision Song Contest.

The song they came up with was "Save Your Kisses for Me" and featured Lee on lead vocals. The song went on to win the Eurovision and made No.1 in several countries including the UK, where it became a million seller. Lee received three Ivor Novello Awards for this composition.

The group continued this run of success over the next three years with two more UK No.1 hits "Angelo" and "Figaro" – both co-written by Lee.

Brotherhood of Man regularly toured the UK and appeared on television throughout Europe. until 20 October 2020 when they retired from the road.

== Personal life, illness and death ==
Martin Lee had a daughter from his first marriage, born in 1973.

Soon after she joined the Brotherhood of Man in late 1973, Sandra Stevens began a relationship with Lee and they were living together by the time of their Eurovision win in 1976. Lee married Stevens in August 1979. They lived in Surrey.

Lee died from heart failure following a short illness, on 29 September 2024, aged 77.

== Discography ==
Awards and achievements
Preceded by (Netherlands) Teach-In with "Ding-A-Dong"	Winner of the Eurovision Song Contest; 1976 (as part of Brotherhood of Man)	Succeeded by (France) Marie Myriam with "L'oiseau et l'enfant"
Preceded by The Shadows with "Let Me Be the One"	UK in the Eurovision Song Contest; 1976 (as part of Brotherhood of Man)	Succeeded by Lynsey de Paul and Mike Moran with "Rock Bottom"
