= Tony Hiller =

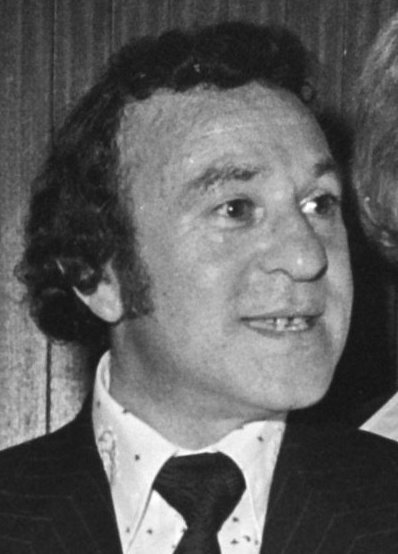
- Hiller at the Eurovision Song Contest 1976

Background information
- Born: Anthony Toby Hiller; 30 July 1927; Bethnal Green, London, England
- Died: 26 August 2018 (aged 91)
- Occupations: Songwriter, record producer, music publisher
- Years active: 1950s–2018
- Website: www.tonyhiller.com

Anthony Toby Hiller (30 July 1927 – 26 August 2018) was an English songwriter and record producer. He was best known for writing and/or producing hits for Brotherhood of Man, including "United We Stand" (1970) and "Save Your Kisses for Me" (1976).

== Biography ==
The eldest of eight children, he was born in Bethnal Green, East London, England. Along with other staff and students from his Jews' Free School, he was evacuated to Ely, Cambridgeshire, in 1939. He began his musical career as a member of the song and dance duo the Hiller Brothers, sharing the stage with his brother Irving. The Hiller Brothers appeared with many performers of the time, including Alma Cogan, Tommy Cooper, Val Doonican, Matt Monro, The Shadows, Bernard Manning, Kathy Kirby, Roger Whittaker, Rip Taylor, Gene Vincent, Lance Percival, Tessie O'Shea, Frank Ifield, Deep River Boys, the Dallas Boys, the Clark Brothers, Paul Melba, and Ray Burns.

Hiller was best known for writing and/or producing numerous hits for Brotherhood of Man, including "United We Stand" (1970), "Save Your Kisses for Me" (1976), "Angelo" (1977), and "Figaro" (1978). The song "United We Stand" is considered a worldwide standard and has been recorded by over 100 different artists. Thirty years after the original hit, the song was popularised again by becoming a patriotic and spiritual anthem, and was recorded by several more artists. It was used numerous times in the production of various network news broadcasts during coverage of the 9/11 events.

Hiller also wrote "Caroline", recorded by The Fortunes for Decca Records in 1964, which became famous as the theme tune for the North Sea pirate station Radio Caroline, and is still used as the station theme today.

Over 500 other artists have recorded Hiller's songs, including Elton John, Olivia Newton-John, Andy Williams, Ray Stevens, The Miracles, The Hollies, Sonny and Cher, The Osmonds, Glen Campbell, Crystal Gayle, Anne Murray, and Ed Bruce. Hiller won three Ivor Novello Awards and a Gold Badge Award for his services to the British music industry.

== Chart hits ==
Song title	Writer(s)	Artist	Country	Year
"He Don't Want Your Love Anymore"	(Hiller/Dawson/Ford)	Lulu	UK	1965
"United We Stand"	(Hiller/Simons)	Brotherhood of Man	UK/US/Europe	1970
"Where are You Going to My Love"	(Hiller/Goodison/Day/Leslie)	Brotherhood of Man	UK/US	1970
"Reach Out Your Hand"	(Hiller)	Brotherhood of Man	US	1971
"Sunny Honey Girl"	(Hiller/Greenaway/Cook/Goodison)	Cliff Richard	UK/Europe	1971
"United We Stand"	(Hiller/Simons)	Wess & Dhori Ghezzi	Italy	1973
"Lady"	(Hiller/Lee/Sheriden)	Brotherhood of Man	Europe	1974
"Daddy Loves You Honey"	(Hiller/Raymonde)	Dorsey Burnette	US	1974
"Kiss Me Kiss Your Baby"	(credited as producer only)	Brotherhood of Man	Europe	1975
"Save Your Kisses for Me"	(Hiller/Lee/Sheriden)	Brotherhood of Man	UK/US/Europe	1976
"My Sweet Rosalie"	(Hiller/Lee/Sheriden)	Brotherhood of Man	UK/Europe	1976
"Save Your Kisses for Me"	(Hiller/Lee/Sheriden)	Bobby Vinton	US	1976
"Save Your Kisses for Me"	(Hiller/Lee/Sheriden)	Margo Smith	US	1976
"Save Your Kisses for Me"	(Hiller/Lee/Sheriden)	Rex Gildo	Germany	1976
"Manchester United"	(Hiller/Hiller)	Manchester United Football Club	UK	1976
"Oh Boy (The Mood I'm In)"	(credited as producer only)	Brotherhood of Man	UK/Europe	1977
"Angelo"	(Hiller/Lee/Sheriden)	Brotherhood of Man	UK/Europe	1977
"Highwayman"	(Hiller/Lee/Sheriden)	Brotherhood of Man	Europe	1977
"Angelo"	(Hiller/Lee/Sheriden)	The Barron Knights	UK	1977
"Figaro"	(Edens/Hiller/Lee/Sheriden)	Brotherhood of Man	UK/Europe	1978
"Beautiful Lover"	(Hiller/Lee/Sheriden)	Brotherhood of Man	UK/Europe	1978
"Middle of the Night"	(Hiller/Lee/Sheriden)	Brotherhood of Man	UK/Europe	1978
"You're the Greatest Lover"	(credited as producer only)	Gina and the Champions	Ireland	1979
"Who Do You Wanna Be"	(credited as producer only)	Gina and the Champions	Ireland	1979
"Put a Light in Your Window"	(Hiller/Curtis)	Tony Christie	Germany	1981
"Lightning Flash"	(Hiller/Lee/Upton)	Brotherhood of Man	UK	1982
"Here We Go"	(Hiller/Spiro)	Everton Football Club	UK	1985
"Nights"	(Hiller/Hill)	Ed Bruce	US	1986
"We’ve Got the Whole World at Our Feet"	(Hiller/James/James)	England World Cup Squad	UK	1986
"Sitting on Top of the World"	(Hiller/James/James)	Liverpool Football Club	UK	1986
"Glad all Over" / "Where Eagles Fly"	(Hiller/Upton)	Crystal Palace Football Club	UK	1990
"Only Fools (Never Fall in Love)"	(Hiller/Upton)	Sonia	UK	1991
"No One Can Stop Us Now"	(Hiller/Upton)	Chelsea Football Club	UK	1994
"Spilled Perfume"	(Hiller/Hill)	Gil Grand	Canada	1998
"Over You"	(Hiller/Hill)	Anne Murray	Canada	1998
"United We Stand"	(Hiller/Simons)	Ray Stevens	US	2002
"United We Stand"	(Hiller/Simons)	Six	Ireland	2003

== Awards and achievements ==
- Three Ivor Novello Awards (UK)
- Ivor Novello Nomination, International Hit of the Year (UK)
- British Academy of Songwriters, Composers and Authors, Councillor (UK)
- British Academy of Composers and Songwriters, Gold Badge of Merit (UK)
- Six ASCAP Awards (US)
- Two ASCAP Chart Buster Awards (US)
- Eurovision Song Contest winner
- Top selling single of 1976 (UK)
- Yamaha Song Contest, Outstanding Composition
- Performing Right Society (now PRS for Music), Director
- Recipient of over 40 Silver, Gold and Platinum Discs
- Society of Distinguished Songwriters
