= Albert Hammond discography =

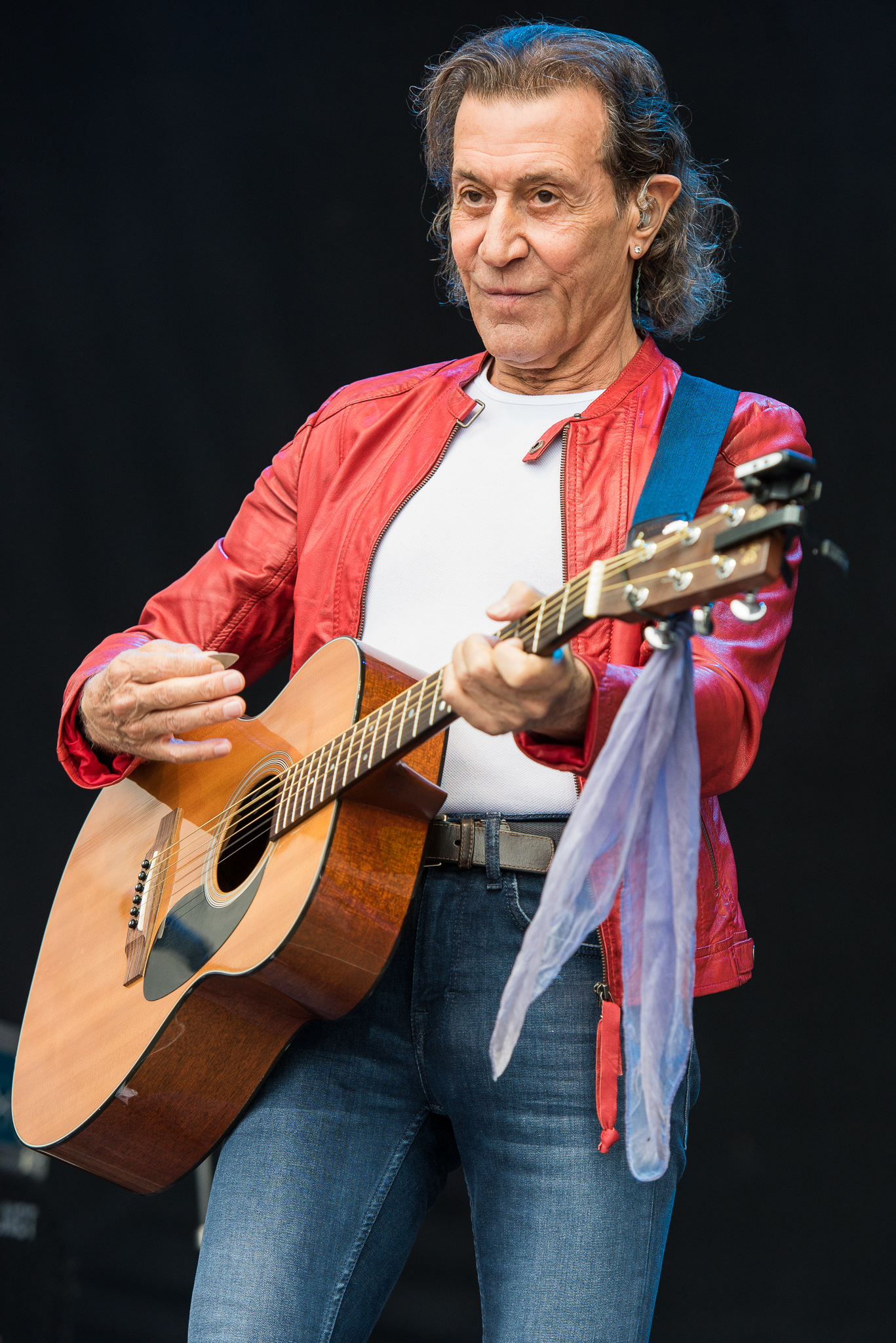
- Studio albums: 19
- Live albums: 1
- Compilation albums: 8
- Singles: 56

This is the discography of British-Gibraltarian singer-songwriter Albert Hammond. For information about the discography of the Family Dogg, see The Family Dogg § Discography.

== Albums ==
=== Studio albums ===
Year	Title	Details	Peak chart positions							
Year	Title	Details	AUS	CAN	GER	JPN	NL	NOR	SPA	US
1972	It Never Rains in Southern California	Released: October 1972; Label: Mums; Formats: LP, MC	62	53	—	—	—	—	13	77
1973	The Free Electric Band	Released: August 1973; Label: Mums; Formats: LP, MC	—	—	40	—	—	8	—	193
1974	Albert Hammond	Released: September 1974; Label: Mums; Formats: LP, MC	—	—	30	—	3	—	—	—
1975	99 Miles from L.A.	Released: November 1975; Label: Epic; Formats: LP, MC	—	—	32	—	—	—	—	—
1976	My Spanish Album	Released: 1976; Label: Epic; Formats: LP, MC	—	—	—	—	—	—	6	—
1976	When I Need You	Released: September 1976; Label: Epic; Formats: LP, MC	—	—	—	—	—	—	—	—
1977	Mi Album de Recuerdos	Released: 1977; Label: Epic, Caytronics; Formats: LP, MC	—	—	—	—	—	—	—	—
1978	Albert Louis Hammond	Released: 1978; Label: Epic, Caytronics; Formats: LP, MC	—	—	—	—	—	—	5	—
1979	Al Otro Lado del Sol	Released: 1979; Label: Epic; Formats: LP, MC	—	—	—	—	—	—	—	—
1981	Your World and My World	Released: May 1981; Label: CBS, Columbia; Formats: LP, MC	—	—	—	18	—	—	—	—
1981	Comprenderte	Released: 1981; Label: Epic; Formats: LP	—	—	—	—	—	—	—	—
1982	Somewhere in America	Released: 1982; Label: Columbia, Epic; Formats: LP	—	—	—	—	—	—	—	—
1986	Hamond and West	Released: 1986; Label: K-tel; Formats: CD, LP; With Albert West	—	—	—	—	4	—	—	—
1989	Best of Me	Released: 1989; Label: CBS; Formats: CD, LP	—	—	—	—	—	—	—	—
1996	Coplas and Songs	Released: 1996; Label: Epic; Formats: CD	—	—	—	—	—	—	—	—
2005	Revolution of the Heart	Released: 23 May 2005; Label: SPV GmbH; Formats: CD, digital download	—	—	—	—	—	—	—	—
2010	Legend	Released: 19 November 2010; Label: Sony Music; Formats: CD, 2xCD, digital download	—	—	—	—	—	—	9	—
2012	Legend II	Released: 13 November 2012; Label: Sony Music; Formats: CD, digital download	—	—	—	—	—	—	37	—
2016	In Symphony	Released: 21 October 2016; Label: BMG; Formats: CD, 2xLP, digital download; Deluxe version released in 2018 with a live concert DVD as Live in Berlin – in Symphony	—	—	30	—	—	—	—	—
2024	Body of Work	Released: 1 March 2024; Label: earMUSIC; Formats: CD, 2xLP, digital download	—	—	88	—	—	—	—	—
2024	Christmas	Released: 8 November 2024; Label: earMUSIC; Formats: CD, LP, digital download	—	—	—	—	—	—	—	—
"—" denotes releases that did not chart or were not released in that territory.

=== Live albums ===
Year	Title	Details
2013	Songbook 2013 – Live in Wilhelmshaven	Released: 25 October 2013; Label: Hypertension; Formats: 2xCD, digital download

=== Compilation albums ===
Year	Title	Details	Peak chart positions
Year	Title	Details	SPA
1976	Albert Hammond Canta Sus Grandes Éxitos en Español e Inglés	Released: 1976; Label: CBS; Formats: LP	5
1976	Greatest Hits	Released: 1976; Label: Epic; Formats: LP, MC	—
1982	The Best of Albert Hammond	Released: 1982; Label: CBS; Formats: LP. MC	—
1988	The Very Best of Albert Hammond	Released: 1988; Label: CBS; Formats: CD. MC	—
1992	12 Exitos	Released: 1992; Label: Sony; Formats: CD	—
1997	Todas Sus Grabaciones en Español Para Discos Epic (1975–1978)	Released: 1 June 1997; Label: Rama Lama Music; Formats: 2xCD	—
2004	It Never Rains in Southern California – The Very Best Of	Released: 19 April 2004; Label: Sony Music; Formats: 2xCD	—
2016	Original Album Classics	Released: 18 March 2016; Label: Sony Music; Formats: 5xCD box set	—
"—" denotes releases that did not chart or were not released

== Singles ==
Year	Single	Peak chart positions												Album
Year	Single	AUS	CAN	CAN AC	GER	NL	NOR	NZ	SA	SPA	UK	US	US AC	Album
1963	"Hey Little Girl" (as part of the Diamond Boys)	—	—	—	—	—	—	—	—	—	—	—	—	Non-album singles
1964	"I'll Do It to You" (with Richard Cartwright)	—	—	—	—	—	—	—	—	—	—	—	—	Non-album singles
1967	"I Can Make the Rain Fall Up" (with Mike Hazlewood)	—	—	—	—	—	—	—	—	—	—	—	—	Non-album singles
1969	"Broken Hearts Brigade" (with Mike Hazlewood)	—	—	—	—	—	—	—	—	—	—	—	—	Non-album singles
1969	"Hey Love Let Me In" (with Mike Hazlewood)	—	—	—	—	—	—	—	—	—	—	—	—	Non-album singles
1969	"Follow the Bouncing Ball" (with Steve Rowland)	—	—	—	—	—	—	—	—	—	—	—	—	Non-album singles
1972	"Down by the River"	18	—	—	—	—	—	—	—	—	—	91	38	It Never Rains in Southern California
1972	"It Never Rains in Southern California"	12	2	38	9	21	3	2	—	1	51 (Note: Chart position is from the official UK "Breakers List".)	5	2	It Never Rains in Southern California
1973	"If You Gotta Break Another Heart"	—	—	54	—	—	—	—	—	—	—	63	—	It Never Rains in Southern California
1973	"From Great Britain to L.A." (Japan-only release)	—	—	—	—	—	—	—	—	—	—	—	—	It Never Rains in Southern California
1973	"The Free Electric Band"	38	44	28	4	3	1	—	11	29	19	48	—	The Free Electric Band
1973	"The Peacemaker"	55	71	—	17	10	4	6	1	—	—	80	—	The Free Electric Band
1973	"For the Peace of All Mankind" (Japan-only release)	—	—	—	—	—	—	—	—	—	—	—	—	The Free Electric Band
1973	"Everything I Want to Do"	—	—	—	7	—	6	—	1	—	—	—	—	The Free Electric Band
1973	"Rebecca" (Italy-only release)	—	—	—	—	—	—	—	—	—	—	—	—	The Free Electric Band
1973	"Half a Million Miles from Home"	86	—	46	—	—	—	19	—	—	—	87	26	Albert Hammond
1974	"I'm a Train"	85	37	32	2	7	7	7	—	12	—	31	15	Albert Hammond
1974	"I Don't Wanna Die in an Air Disaster"	—	80	27	—	3	—	—	—	—	—	81	—	Albert Hammond
1974	"The Air That I Breathe" (New Zealand-only release)	—	—	—	—	—	—	—	—	—	—	—	—	It Never Rains in Southern California
1974	"Names, Tags, Numbers & Labels"	—	—	—	—	—	—	—	—	—	—	—	—	Albert Hammond
1974	"New York City Here I Come" (Germany and Netherlands-only release)	—	—	—	28	12	—	—	—	—	—	—	—	Albert Hammond
1975	"We're Running Out"	—	—	—	—	—	—	—	—	—	—	—	—	Albert Hammond
1975	"99 Miles from L.A."	—	78	4	—	—	—	—	—	—	—	91	1	99 Miles from L.A.
1975	"Lay the Music Down"	—	—	—	—	—	—	—	—	—	—	—	—	99 Miles from L.A.
1975	"Down by the River" (re-recorded version)	—	—	—	8	17	—	—	—	—	—	—	—	99 Miles from L.A.
1975	"These Are the Good Old Days"	—	—	—	14	—	—	—	—	—	—	—	—	99 Miles from L.A.
1976	"Echame a Mi la Culpa"	—	—	—	—	—	—	—	—	1	—	—	—	My Spanish Album
1976	"Ansiedad"	—	—	—	—	—	—	—	—	5	—	—	—	My Spanish Album
1976	"Moonlight Lady"	—	—	—	—	—	—	—	—	—	—	—	—	When I Need You
1977	"To All the Girls I've Loved Before"	—	—	—	—	—	—	—	—	—	—	—	—	When I Need You
1977	"When I Need You" (Germany and Italy-only release)	—	—	—	—	—	—	—	—	—	—	—	—	When I Need You
1977	"Terminado"	—	—	—	—	—	—	—	—	—	—	—	—	Mi Album de Recuerdos
1977	"Eres Toda una Mujer"	—	—	—	—	—	—	—	—	10	—	—	—	Mi Album de Recuerdos
1978	"Enredao" (Spain-only release)	—	—	—	—	—	—	—	—	—	—	—	—	Mi Album de Recuerdos
1978	"Rio de Amor" (US-only release)	—	—	—	—	—	—	—	—	—	—	—	—	Mi Album de Recuerdos
1978	"Espinita" (Spain-only release)	—	—	—	—	—	—	—	—	7	—	—	—	Albert Louis Hammond
1979	"Mujer de Promesas" (Spain-only release)	—	—	—	—	—	—	—	—	—	—	—	—	Al Otro Lado del Sol
1980	"Píntame con Besos" (Spain-only release)	—	—	—	—	—	—	—	—	—	—	—	—	Al Otro Lado del Sol
1981	"When I'm Gone"	—	—	—	50	—	—	—	7	—	—	—	—	Your World and My World
1981	"I Want You Back Here with Me" / "Memories" (US and Canada-only release)	—	—	—	—	—	—	—	—	—	—	—	—	Your World and My World
1981	"Comprenderte" (Spain-only release)	—	—	—	—	—	—	—	—	—	—	—	—	Comprenderte
1981	"Your World and My World"	—	—	—	—	—	—	—	—	—	—	—	—	Your World and My World
1982	"The Light at the End of the Line" (Netherlands-only release)	—	—	—	—	—	—	—	—	—	—	—	—	Somewhere in America
1982	"Somewhere in America" (US-only release)	—	—	—	—	—	—	—	—	—	—	—	—	Somewhere in America
1986	"Give a Little Love" (with Albert West)	—	—	—	40	3	—	—	—	—	—	—	—	Hammond & West
1986	"Air Disaster" (with Albert West)	—	—	—	—	—	—	—	—	—	—	—	—	Hammond & West
1987	"Secrets of the Night" (with Albert West)	—	—	—	—	—	—	—	—	—	—	—	—	Hammond & West
1989	"Where Were You"	—	—	—	—	—	—	—	—	—	—	—	—	Best of Me
1989	"Under the Christmas Tree"	—	—	—	86	—	—	—	—	—	—	—	—	Best of Me
1990	"When I Need You" (re-recorded version)	—	—	—	—	—	—	—	—	—	—	—	—	Best of Me
1996	"Maria Dolores" (Spain-only release)	—	—	—	—	—	—	—	—	—	—	—	—	Coplas and Songs
1996	"Camino Verde" (Spain-only release)	—	—	—	—	—	—	—	—	—	—	—	—	Coplas and Songs
2012	"The Snows of New York"	—	—	—	—	—	—	—	—	—	—	—	—	Legend II
2014	"I Guess I Really Had It Coming"	—	—	—	—	—	—	—	—	—	—	—	—	Legend II
2016	"I'm a Train" (re-recorded version)	—	—	—	—	—	—	—	—	—	—	—	—	In Symphony
2019	"Hey St. Patrick"	—	—	—	—	—	—	—	—	—	—	—	—	Non-album single
"—" denotes releases that did not chart or were not released in that territory.
