= It Never Rains in Southern California (compilation album) =

Compilation album by Albert Hammond
- Released: 5 November 1996
- Genre: Rock
- Length: 74:53
- Label: Collectables Records
- Producer: Albert Hammond; Mike Hazlewood

Professional ratings
Review scores
| Source | Rating |
|---|---|
| Allmusic | 4.5/5 stars |

It Never Rains in Southern California is a compilation album by the British singer and songwriter Albert Hammond. It was released in 1996 under the Collectables Records label.

== Track listing ==
1. "Listen to the World" – 2:55
2. "If You Gotta Break Another Heart" – 2:38
3. "From Great Britain to L.A." – 3:29
4. "Brand New Day" – 3:21
5. "Anyone Here in the Audience" – 3:55
6. "It Never Rains in Southern California" – 3:51
7. "Names, Tags, Numbers and Labels" – 4:27
8. "Down by the River" – 3:03
9. "The Road to Understanding" – 4:20
10. "The Air That I Breathe" – 3:47
11. "Smokey Factory Blues" – 3:28
12. "The Peacemaker" – 2:40
13. "Woman of the World" – 3:06
14. "Everything I Want to Do" – 2:34
15. "Who's for Lunch Today?" – 2:55
16. "The Free Electric Band" – 3:23
17. "Rebecca" – 3:06
18. "The Day the British Army Lost the War" – 4:02
19. "For the Peace of All Mankind" – 4:11
20. "I Think I'll Go That Way" – 3:34
21. "Half a Million Miles from Home" – 2:49
22. "I'm a Train" – 3:19

== Personnel ==
- Albert Hammond - vocals, guitar
- Larry Carlton, Todd Sharpville, Dean Parks - guitar
- Joe Osborn, Todd Sharpville - bass guitar
- Hal Blaine, Jim Gordon - drums
- Larry Knechtel - piano
