= It Never Rains =

It Never Rains may refer to:

- It Never Rains..., a 1982 episode of Only Fools and Horses
- "It Never Rains", the fifth and final track on Dire Straits' album Love over Gold
- "It Never Rains in Southern California", a 1973 song by Albert Hammond
- "It Never Rains (In Southern California)", a 1990 song by Tony! Toni! Toné!

== See also ==
- When It Rains, It Pours (disambiguation)
- It Never Rains in Southern California (album), a 1972 record album by Albert Hammond
- It Never Rains in Southern California (compilation album), a 1996 album by Albert Hammond
