= Snakes and Ladders (1996 film) =

1996 Irish comedy film

- Directed by: Trish McAdam
- Written by: Trish McAdam; Gina Moxley
- Produced by: Lilyan Sievernich; Chris Sievernich (de); Rudolf Wichmann; Larissa Bills
- Starring: Sean Hughes; Pom Boyd; Gina Moxley; Rosaleen Linehan
- Cinematography: Dietrich Lohmann
- Edited by: Peter Przygodda
- Music by: Pierce Turner
- Release date: 1996
- Running time: 93 minutes
- Countries: Ireland; United Kingdom; Germany
- Language: English

Snakes and Ladders is a 1996 Irish comedy film directed by Trish McAdam.

== Plot summary ==
Jean (Pom Boyd) and Kate (Gina Moxley) are two "nearing-thirty" best friends, who share a flat in contemporary Dublin and support themselves by working as street performers in the city. The two women do battle with the conflicting pressures of friendship, family, love and the struggle for success. The unsettled Jean has a major attitude problem, and while she rejects the older generation as represented by her interfering mother Nora (Rosaleen Linehan), she is also unable to fully embrace the alternative lifestyle of her boyfriend musician, Martin (Sean Hughes), her partner Kate and their gay friend Orla (Cathy White). Impulsively accepting a marriage proposal from Martin, she soon panics at the prospect of the wedding and sets in motion a chaotic series of events which affect all the characters' lives.

== Cast ==
- Pom Boyd - Jean
- Gina Moxley - Kate
- Sean Hughes - Martin
- Rosaleen Linehan - Nora
- Catherine White - Orla
- Pierce Turner - Dave
- Paudge Behan - Dan
- Stella McCusker - Maureen
- Marie Mullen - Patricia
- Maureen Toal - Rose
- Laurie Morton - Gwen
- Barry Cassin - Mr. Duffy
- Ena May - Bridie
- Bernie Downes - Shop Assistant
- Joe Dolan - Self
- Anne-Sophie Briest - Sybille
- Eamonn Hunt - Producer
- Oliver Maguire - 1st Interviewer

== Reception ==
As described by the Irish Film Institute in their 2019 retrospective of the work of McAdam, the film "captures a strong sense of Dublin in the nineties as a city with a vibrant music, pub and club scene. Music plays a crucial role, with a fine score composed and performed by Pierce Turner, who plays the lead singer in Martin’s band. (There's also an amusing cameo appearance by Joe Dolan, singing Make Me an Island and You're Such a Good Looking Woman to the delight of members of The Dead Husbands Club). But the film is no fulsome celebration of great times. As the title itself implies, the game of life has its ups and down, with failures as well as successes. Dublin is now a city of youth, life and colour, says McAdam, but behind that colour the grey past still lingers. We may have moved on in recent years to new-found confidence, but behind that confidence the old basic everyday emotional problems will always be with us."

Variety magazine described the film thus: "a minor, harmless picture that lacks fresh angles or vigorous motivations to tell its tale (which also) suffers from an overinsistent determination to entertain and gratify its viewers at all costs."

In Germany, the film was released as Zwei seriöse Damen in Dublin (Two Serious Ladies in Dublin).

== Funding ==
The film was funded by the Irish Film Board, Zweites Deutsches Fernsehen and Miramax amongst others.

== Screening ==
The film was entered into the Sundance, London, San Sebastián and Toronto Film Festivals and was selected for screening as part of the Irish Film Institute's Trish McAdam Season in May 2019.
