= Teresa (song) =

1969 song by Joe Dolan

"Teresa" is a song by Irish singer Joe Dolan. The song written by Albert Hammond and Mike Hazlewood and produced by Geoffrey Everitt. It was released in 1969 becoming an international hit for Dolan.

== Charts ==
The song peaked at number 1 on the Irish Singles Chart and number 20 on the UK Singles Chart. It also reached number 6 on the Belgian Ultratop chart and number 38 on the German Singles Chart.
