= A Way of Life (The Family Dogg album) =

Studio album by The Family Dogg
- Released: November 1969
- Recorded: April – May 1969 at IBC Studios, London; Chappell Studios, London; Landsdowne Studios, London
- Genre: Pop rock; folk rock
- Length: 55:01
- Label: Bell
- Producer: Steve Rowland

The Family Dogg chronology
| A Way of Life (1969) | The View from Rowlands Head (1971) |

Professional ratings
Review scores
| Source | Rating |
|---|---|
| Allmusic | 4/5 stars |

A Way of Life is the début album by British vocal harmony and folk rock group The Family Dogg. It features singer-songwriter Albert Hammond, and a session group that includes Led Zeppelin's John Paul Jones, Jimmy Page, and John Bonham. Elton John may have played piano on the title track. Released by the UK subsidiary of Bell Records in November, 1969, the album was reissued in 1995 as a CD with bonus tracks, which included B-sides and songs found on other compilation and sampler records.

== Track listing ==
1. "Julie's Just Gone" (Mark Jordan) – 3:20
2. "All the Best Songs and Marches" (Terry Stamp) – 2:31
3. "In the Ghetto" (Mac Davis) – 3:06
4. "Today I Killed a Man I Didn't Know" (Roger Cook, Roger Greenaway) – 4:13
5. "Pattern People" (Jimmy Webb) – 2:40
6. "Save the Life of My Child" (Paul Simon) – 4:45
7. "Love Minus Zero/No Limit" (Bob Dylan) – 2:54
8. "Reflections 'Of Your Face'" (Amory Kane) – 4:05
9. "Run Run Run Fly Fly Fly" (Ben Findon) – 2:47
10. "Moonshine Mary" (Albert Hammond, Mike Hazlewood) – 3:26
11. "You Were On My Mind" (Traditional; arranged by Kane, Rowland, Hammond, Hazlewood) – 4:37
12. "A Place in the Sun" (Bryan Wells, Ronald Miller) – 4:55
13. "A Way of Life" (Roger Cook, Roger Greenaway) – 4:04

== Personnel ==
- Steve Rowland – Lead vocals (tracks 1, 3–9, 11, 13), backing vocals, congas, producer
- Albert Hammond – Lead vocals (tracks 4–7, 9, 11–13), backing vocals, 12-string guitar
- Mike Hazlewood – Lead vocals (tracks 2, 5, 7), backing vocals, acoustic guitar
- Christine Holmes – Lead vocals (track 5), backing vocals (joined group in June 1969)
- Pam "Zooey" Quinn – Lead vocals (track 10), backing vocals
- Doreen De Veuve – vocals (uncredited; left group in June 1969)
- Jimmy Page – Electric guitars (tracks 4, 11, 13)
- John Paul Jones – Bass guitar, arranger (tracks 4, 8, 11)
- Amory Kane – guitar, fills between every track
- John Bonham – Drums
- Alan Parker – Acoustic guitar
- Alan "Hawk" Hawkshaw – Piano, organ
- Clem Cattini – Drums
- Big Jim Sullivan – Arranger, guitar (uncredited)
- Elton John – Piano (track 13, uncredited)
- Bette Wernick (née Ellis)- Backing Vocals (track 13)
- Stan Barrett – Percussion
- Denis Lopez – Percussion
- Phil Dennys – Arranger
- Reg Tilsey – Arranger
- Ken Woodman – Arranger
- Damon Lyon Shaw – Engineer (IBC Studios)
- John Iles – Engineer (Chappell Studios)
- John Timperley– Engineer (Chappell Studios)
- John Mackswith – Engineer (Landsdowne Studios)
- Mike Weighell – Engineer (Landsdowne Studios)

== Chart positions ==
=== Album ===
| Year | Chart | Position |
|---|---|---|
| 1969 | Billboard Pop albums (Billboard 200) | |
| 1969 | UK Albums Chart | |

=== Singles ===
| Year | Single | Chart | Position |
|---|---|---|---|
| 1969 | "A Way of Life" | Billboard Hot 100 | |
| 1969 | "A Way of Life" | UK Singles Chart | No. 6 |
| 1969 | "Arizona" | UK Singles Chart | |
