= EuroWeekly News =

Spanish newspaper published in English

Euro Weekly News
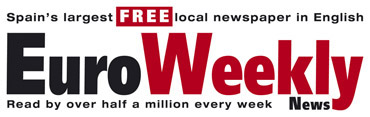

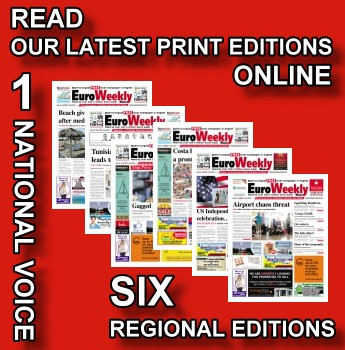
- Different regional issues distributed weekly in Spain
- Owner(s): Steven and Michael Euesden
- Publisher: EWN Media SA
- President: Michael Euesden
- Language: English
- Headquarters: Fuengirola, Spain
- Circulation: 580,000 (as of July 2020)Weekly
- Website: euroweeklynews.com

EuroWeekly News (EWN) is the largest English newspaper in Spain.

== Company history ==
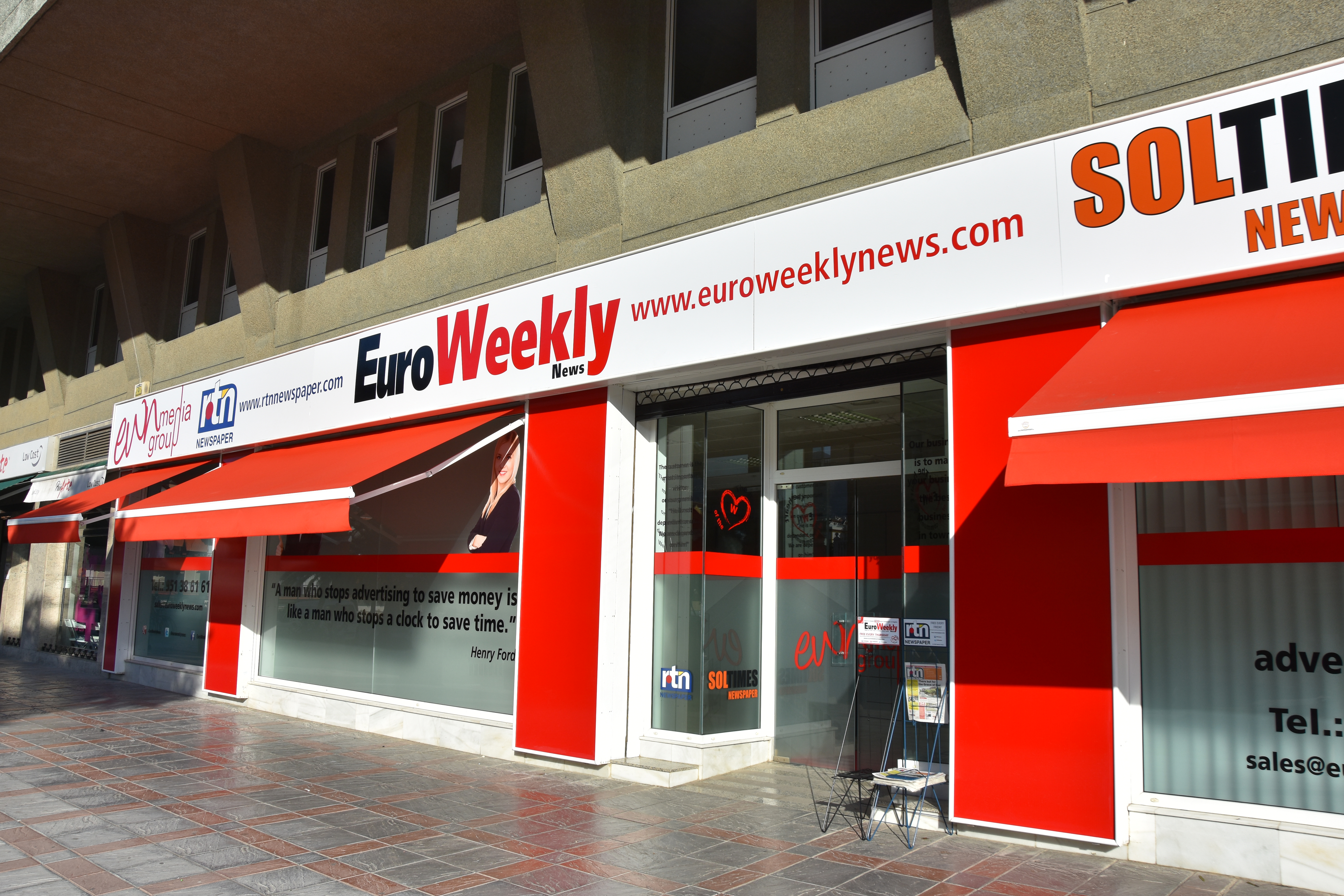
Euro Weekly News - Fuengirola Office - Spain

EuroWeekly News is Spain's largest group of free English language newspapers and has been operating since 2002. The publication is owned by a board of directors. The group consists of seven newspapers that cover Costa Blanca North, Costa Blanca South, Costa Cálida, Almeria, Axarquia Costa Tropical (east of Málaga), the Costa del Sol and Mallorca.

A total of 134,000 copies are distributed weekly across the region. Its target audience is the English speaking immigrants living in Spain and it offers a traditional British style newspaper concentrating on local news and issues.

Its distribution covers most of the main expatriate communities in Spain just south of Valencia along the coast to Gibraltar/La Linea. Its remit is stated as to give the expatriate communities in Spain all their local news and to give them a voice. Euro Weekly News also functions as a free online medium operating solely on advertising revenue. The website covers not just local news but also national and international events.

== Layout and format ==
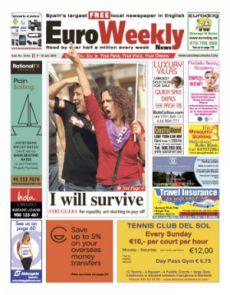
Euro Weekly Newspaper in Spain

Each edition is in compact format, measuring 280 x 430 mm or 11 x 16.9 inches, and relies heavily on advertising as a free publication. Pagination varies with each issue and edition. Currently, the largest edition is the Costa del Sol (128 pages) followed by the Costa Blanca North (88 pages) Costa Blanca South (96 pages), Mallorca (64 pages) and Axarquia Costa Tropical (48 pages). The largest edition ever at 200 pages was the Costa del Sol issue published October 2–8, 2014 (Issue 1526).

Each newspaper follows a traditional British newspaper format, starting with news at the front through to a regional news page, and European and Russian news.

The back starts with a six-page finance section followed by a crosswords/puzzles section called Time Out. There are also health and beauty, homes and gardens, and motoring sections before classified adverts and sports pages. The emphasis of the papers is on local news with a high story count.

=== Opinion section ===
In addition to local news, the EWN is known for the quality and controversial nature of its columnists. Possibly the most controversial columnist is Leapy Lee, who had a hit single with his song Little Arrows in 1968. He has been writing a weekly column in all editions of the EWN since its start. He has forthright views on many subjects, some of which draw heavy criticism as well as much praise. Nora Johnson also contributes a weekly column in some editions. She has also written several novels with profits going to charity.

=== Columns ===
According to market research carried out by the EWN, its readers' favourite pages are the local news pages with 98 per cent listing them as favoured. Second favourite section is letters (83 per cent) followed by Leapy Lee's column (64.87 per cent) and other columnists ( 63.22 per cent).

== Newsroom restructuring ==
The head office of the EWN is in Mijas, Málaga, where the main production hub is based. This is where all six editions are designed and edited, and where the editor is based. There were another nine regional offices although some recently closed, four of which opened since the start of 2015. These offices are in Benidorm Indoor Market (now closed), Calpe (now closed), Albir, Albox, Mojacar, Torrevieja, Marbella, Palma de Mallorca and Nerja. The newspapers and website were recently redesigned to update its image.

== Awards ==
The Euro Weekly News Media Group was nominated in the AEEPP (Asociaciòn Española de Publicaciones Periòdicas) 9th annual awards ceremony held September 30, 2014 in Madrid. President of the Community of Madrid, Ignacio Gonzalez, presented the Diploma of Honour to former EWN Operations Manager Nicki Burgess. It was the only English-language publication to be honoured.

In The Costa del Sol Business awards by CADE ( Centre for Entrepreneurial Development of Marbella) the EWN was named as Company of the Year 2011.

Has been criticized for its use of misleading (click bait) articles such as the discovery of a new planet "Beyond Neptune" as to imply that a new planet had been discovered in the Solar System when in fact the planet WASP-193b was 1,232 light-years and not within the Solar System.

== Popular culture ==
The Euesdens, in their capacity as directors of the EWN appeared on TV being interviewed by Piers Morgan for an ITV documentary on Marbella in 2010. There have also been appearances on the Jeremy Vine Show and BBC News about benefit fraudsters. The company has also been involved in Benidorm's Got Talent, a talent show based in the Costa Blanca city. After the opening act, co-presenters Steve Shappelle and David Climent (Entertainment Director for Benidorm Palace) introduced the judges: EWN publishers Michel and Steven Euesden. The EWN has and continues also to sponsor the Marbella International Film Festival which brings "independent" film makers from across the globe together each year. The EWN also continues to support a wide variety of charities. This has been in many forms and for a wide variety of subjects from big UK based charities to individuals and organisations in Spain. These have included the Butterfly Ball in Marbella for the UK’s Rhys Daniels Trust which provides ‘homes from home’ for children who require long periods of hospital care a long way from their homes and their families.

The Positively Pink Ball, based on the Costa del Sol, raises money for Positively Pink charity which offers free breast cancer screening as well as support to cancer suffers. MABS, which offers support to cancer sufferers on the Costa Blanca. Severely disabled children including Tomas Leighton and Keira Alvarez Turner have also been supported in newspaper campaigns.
