= Little Arrows =

1968 single by Leapy Lee

- Italian single sleeve

Single by Leapy Lee

from the album Little Arrows
- B-side: "Time Will Tell"
- Released: 28 June 1968
- Studio: Olympic, London
- Genre: Country pop; pop
- Length: 2:42
- Label: MCA
- Songwriters: Albert Hammond; Mike Hazlewood
- Producer: Gordon Mills

Leapy Lee singles chronology
"Boiled Beef and Carrots" (1967)	"Little Arrows" (1968)	"It's All Happening" (1968)

Performance on Beat-Club
- "Little Arrows" on YouTube

"Little Arrows" is a single by English artist Leapy Lee, written by composer Albert Hammond and lyricist Mike Hazlewood. Hammond had met Hazlewood in the band the Family Dogg and formed a songwriting partnership. Meanwhile, Lee was struggling finding success in the music branch, working at a bingo hall, where he met Hammond. The song was composed in the Chelsea Drugstore and is about Cupid shooting his bow and arrow. Musically, it is a country pop song with a whimsical tone. It was recorded at Olympic Studios and produced by Gordon Mills with Jimmy Page as a session guitarist.

MCA Records released "Little Arrows" as a single in the UK on 28 June 1968, and it reached number two on the Record Retailer chart in October of that year. In the US, "Little Arrows" was released by Decca Records and became a crossover hit, reaching number 16 on the Billboard Hot 100 and number two on the Cash Box Country Singles chart. Elsewhere in the world, "Little Arrows" reached number one in Austria, New Zealand, Rhodesia, and Sweden and sold upwards of 4 million copies upon original release. It was the title track of Lee's first album Little Arrows, and was his only pop hit, leading him to be labelled a one-hit wonder.

Leapy Lee's recording of "Little Arrows" received positive reviews in the press for being "gimmicky", but mixed reception by contemporary journalists. Shortly after Lee's original was released, Irish showband Brendan O'Brien & the Dixies released a cover which reached number one in Ireland in September 1968. The song was translated into Swedish by Stig "Stikkan" Anderson as "Amors pilar", which became a hit for Ewa Roos in February 1969. A Spanish version, "Las Flechas del Amor", was recorded by Karina and reached number one on the Los 40 Principales radio station in Spain for seven weeks between March and April of 1969.

== Background and recording ==
British-Gibraltan songwriter Albert Hammond and American producer Steve Rowland met each other in Madrid, Spain in 1966 when Hammond performed in his band the Diamond Boys. Together, they formed The Family Dogg that year, introducing Hammond to songwriter Mike Hazlewood. The formed a songwriting partnership together, with Hammond composing and Hazlewood writing the lyrics. At the same time, singer Leapy Lee (born Graham Pulleyblank) was struggling finding success, having previously recorded several non-charting singles for Pye, Decca and CBS Records, including the unreleased Ray Davies-composition "King of the Whole Wide World" in March 1966. By 1968, Lee was working as a caller in a bingo hall, where Hammond met him after accompanying his aunt there.

According to Hammond, he worked as a dishwasher at the Chelsea Drugstore when he wrote "Little Arrows", and was written as the same time as Hammond's single "I'm a Train" (1974). Lyrically, the song is about the ancient Roman God Cupid shooting his bow and arrow, being "very effective in suggesting" that his arrows "hit their mark" according to musicologist Walter Everett. Musically, Em Casalena identifies "Little Arrows" as country pop, whereas Greg Adams of AllMusic opines it had similarities to a "whimsical, pop-oriented tone". Lee recorded the track at Olympic Studios in Barnes, London with producer Gordon Mills and engineer Vic Smith. Session musicians on the track include guitarist Joe Moretti, alongside Jimmy Page prior to his success in Led Zeppelin. The guitar on the track features an echo box effect throughout.

== Release and commercial performance ==
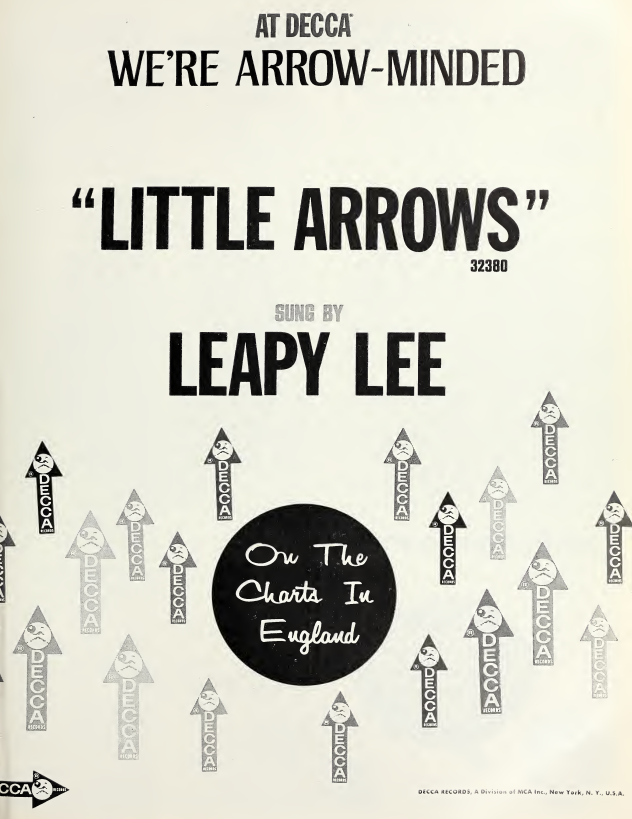
Trade ad for "Little Arrows" in Cash Box

MCA released "Little Arrows" as a single in the UK on 28 June 1968, backed by the B-side "Time Will Tell" which was written by Mills and Johnny Harris. Though initial chart success was slow, the single entered the Record Retailer chart on 27 August 1968 at a position of number 47, steadily climbing the chart until it peaked at number two on 15 October 1968, unable to dislodge "Those Were the Days" by Mary Hopkin from the top position. It exited the chart on 14 January 1969 at a position of 49, having spent a total of 21 weeks on the charts. Shortly after it entered the British charts, the single was released in the US through Decca in August 1968.

On the US Billboard Hot 100, "Little Arrows" debuted on 12 October 1968 at a position of 97, before peaking at number 16 on 7 December. The song became a crossover country hit, being more successful on the Billboard Hot Country Singles chart, where it reached number 11. On the Cash Box Country chart, "Little Arrows" peaked at number two, behind Loretta Lynn's "Your Squaw Is on the Warpath". In Canada, the song peaked at number one on the country chart and number eight on the pop singles chart. Elsewhere in the world, "Little Arrows" was a large success in Africa, Europe and Oceania where it reached number one in Austria, New Zealand, Rhodesia, and Sweden. It also peaked in the top-ten in Australia, Denmark, Norway, South Africa, Switzerland, and West Germany. Prompted by the success, Lee would go on to tour several of these territories.

Upon its initial chart run, "Little Arrows" sold 3 million copies worldwide. It was the first hit composed by Hammond and Hazlewood, shortly followed by the Pipkins "Gimme Dat Ding" (1970). Although Lee would go on to have further top-ten singles in South Africa and a few country chart hits in the US, he is generally considered a one-hit wonder for "Little Arrows". The track acted as the title song for Lee's album Little Arrows, which included two more compositions by Hammond and Hazlewood; "Theresa" and "My Girl Maria". Lee performed "Little Arrows" at the Ryman Auditorium for the Grand Ole Opry on 31 May 1969.

== Reception and covers ==
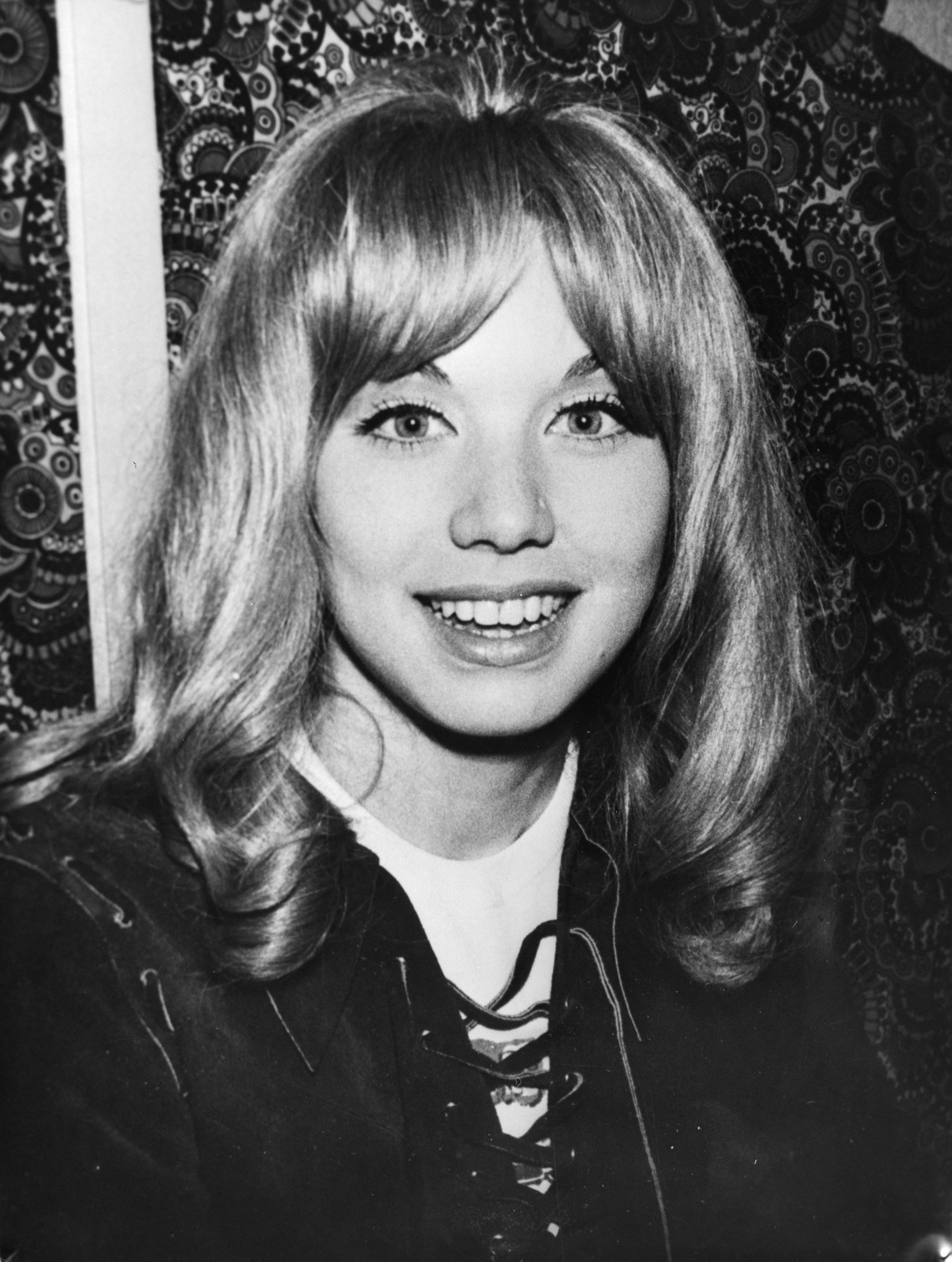
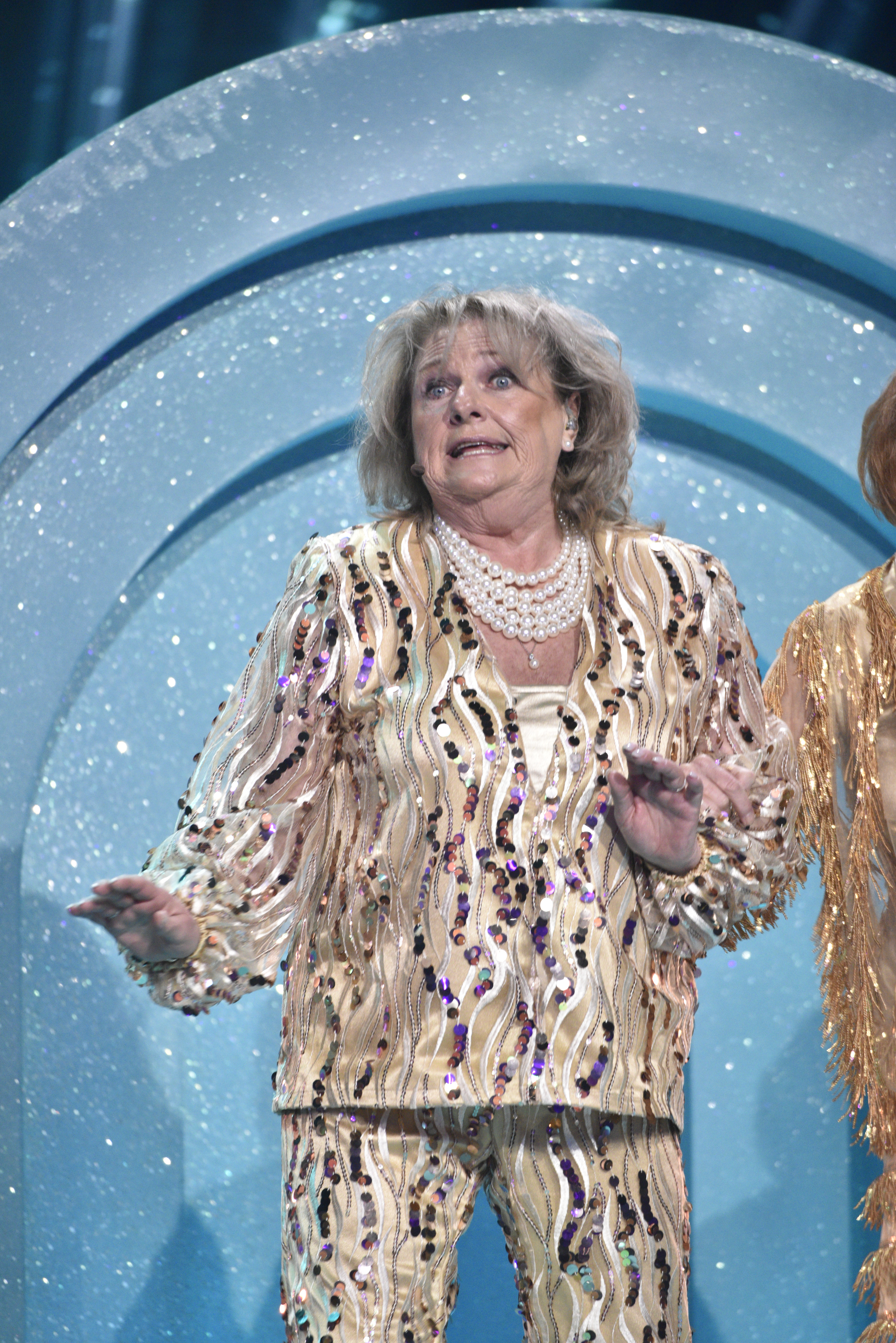
"Little Arrows" was translated and made into hits for Karina (Spanish) and Ewa Roos (Swedish)

Upon original release, "Little Arrows" received primarily positive reviews in the press. Peter Jones of Record Mirror wrote that the single had "a lot of gimmicks and a lot of catchiness", believing it to be a "gas of a record", ending his review by stating "who could want more?" The song was praised in the Eastbourne Gazette for having a catchy chorus and "jolly, jaunty air", noting it to be "highly appropriate chart ammunition". The reviewer also praises the backing musicians, whom they describe as "colourful". The staff reviewer for Billboard stated that the single had an "infectious rhythm" with a "good sound", predicting it to become a hit. The reviewer for Cash Box found the song to be inventive, stating that "Cupid gets the big buildup here".

Retrospectively, Adams stated that "Little Arrows" was an "absolutely delightful song" that was categorized as novelty song even though "its novel imagery is not exactly a joke". Not all assessments of "Little Arrows" were positive; when reminiscing about his childhood, journalist Mark Carroll could only state "what was I thinking?" to owning a copy of the single.

Almost immediately after the release of Leapy Lee's original, "Little Arrows" was covered by Irish showband Brendan O'Brien & the Dixies. The band had first heard Lee's version in early July 1968, before immediately taping their own version of it. Issued as a single in early August 1968, their version of "Little Arrows reached number one in Ireland on 7 September, staying on the charts for 20 weeks. Stig "Stikkan" Anderson rewrote the track with Swedish lyrcis as "Amors pilar" ("Amor's Arrows") for Swedish band the Streaplers, who issued their version of it on a single in September 1968. After the Streaplers version failed to chart, the song was given to Ewa Roos who released her version through Epic Records in December 1968. Her version became a chart hit, reaching number five on sales chart Kvällstoppen and topping Svensktoppen for two weeks in February 1969.

Alfonso Alpin translated the song into Spanish as "Las Flechas del Amor" ("The Arrows of Love"), with an arrangement by Waldo de los Ríos. Spanish pop singer Karina recorded the song, and when released as a single, it reached number one on the Los 40 Principales radio station chart in March 1969, staying there for seven weeks straight. The single sold well enough to award Karina a gold record. According to Hammond, after hearing that "Little Arrows" had been translated and became hits in numerous languages, he felt "it was crazy" and "if this is the way it’s going to be, this is gonna be wonderful".

== Chart performance ==
=== Weekly charts ===
Weekly chart performance for "Little Arrows"
Chart (1968–69)	Peak position
Austria (Disc Parade)	1
Australia (Kent Music Report)	3
Australia (Go-Set)	2
Belgium (Ultratop 50 Flanders)	19
Canada Country Tracks (RPM)	1
Canada Top Singles (RPM)	8
Denmark (Danmarks Radio)	2
Finland (Mitä Suomi soittaa)	16
Netherlands (Dutch Top 40)	25
New Zealand (Listener)	1
Norway (VG-Lista)	4
Rhodesia (Lyons Maid)	1
South Africa (Springbok Radio)	10
Sweden (Kvällstoppen)	3
Sweden (Tio i Topp)	1
Switzerland (Schweizer Hitparade)	2
UK (New Musical Express)	2
UK (Melody Maker)	2
UK (Record Retailer)	2
US Hot Country Singles (Billboard)	11
US Hot 100 (Billboard)	16
US Easy Listening (Billboard)	38
US Country Top 50 (Cash Box)	2
US Top 100 (Cash Box)	16
US 100 Top Pops (Record World)	12
US Juke Box Top 25 (Record World)	7
US Top C&W Singles (Record World)	7
US Top Non-Rock (Record World)	20
West Germany (Media Control)	5

=== Year-end charts ===
Year-end chart performance for "Little Arrows"
Chart (1968)	Peak position
Australia (Kent Music Report)	7
Sweden (Tio i Topp)	5
UK (Record Retailer)	18

Year-end chart performance for "Little Arrows"
Chart (1969)	Peak position
US C&W (Cash Box)	41

=== Brendan O'Brien & the Dixies version ===
Weekly chart performance for "Little Arrows"
Chart (1968)	Peak position
Ireland (IRMA)	1

=== Ewa Roos version ===
Weekly chart performance for "Amors pilar"
Chart (1969)	Peak
Sweden (Kvällstoppen)	5
Sweden (Svensktoppen)	1
