= Albert Hammond (album) =

Studio album by Albert Hammond
- Released: 1974
- Genre: Soft rock
- Label: Epic Records 80026
- Producer: Albert Hammond, Roy Halee; track 6 produced by Don Alfield, Albert Hammond and Roy Halee

Albert Hammond chronology
The Free Electric Band (1973)	Albert Hammond (1974)	99 Miles from L.A. (1975)

Professional ratings
Review scores
Source	Rating
Allmusic	4/5 stars

Albert Hammond (1974) is the third album by British singer, songwriter and music producer Albert Hammond. The album peaked at #3 on the Dutch albums chart and produced three singles which charted on the Hot 100.

== Track listing ==
All tracks by Albert Hammond and Mike Hazlewood

1. "I'm a Train" – 3:22
2. "Everything I Want to Do" (new version) – 2:58
3. "Dime Queen of Nevada" – 3:55
4. "New York City Here I Come" – 3:06
5. "The Girl They Call the Cool Breeze" – 3:53
6. "Names, Tags, Numbers and Labels" (new version) – 2:45
7. "I Don't Wanna Die in an Air Disaster" – 3:40
8. "Half a Million Miles from Home" – 2:49
9. "Fountain Avenue" – 2:57
10. "We're Running Out" – 2:53
11. "Candle Light, Sweet Candle Light" – 2:31
12. "Mary Hot Lips Arizona" – 2:38

== Personnel ==
- Albert Hammond - guitar, vocals
- Jay Lewis, Neal Schon, Larry Carlton - guitars
- Tommy Tedesco - banjo
- Larry Knechtel, Michael Omartian - piano
- Bernie Krause - Moog synthesizer
- Jim Hodgson - keyboards
- Joe Osborn - bass
- Hal Blaine, Jim Gordon - drums
- Victor Feldman - vibraphone
- Andy Narell - steel drums
- Armando Peraza - bongos
- Bill Green - alto saxophone
- Sid Sharp - strings

== Production ==
- Produced by Albert Hammond and Roy Halee, except track 6 (Halee/Hammond/Don Altfield)
- Recording and mix: Roy Halee; "Recordist": Mark Freedman
- Mastered by George Horn
