= The Free Electric Band (album) =

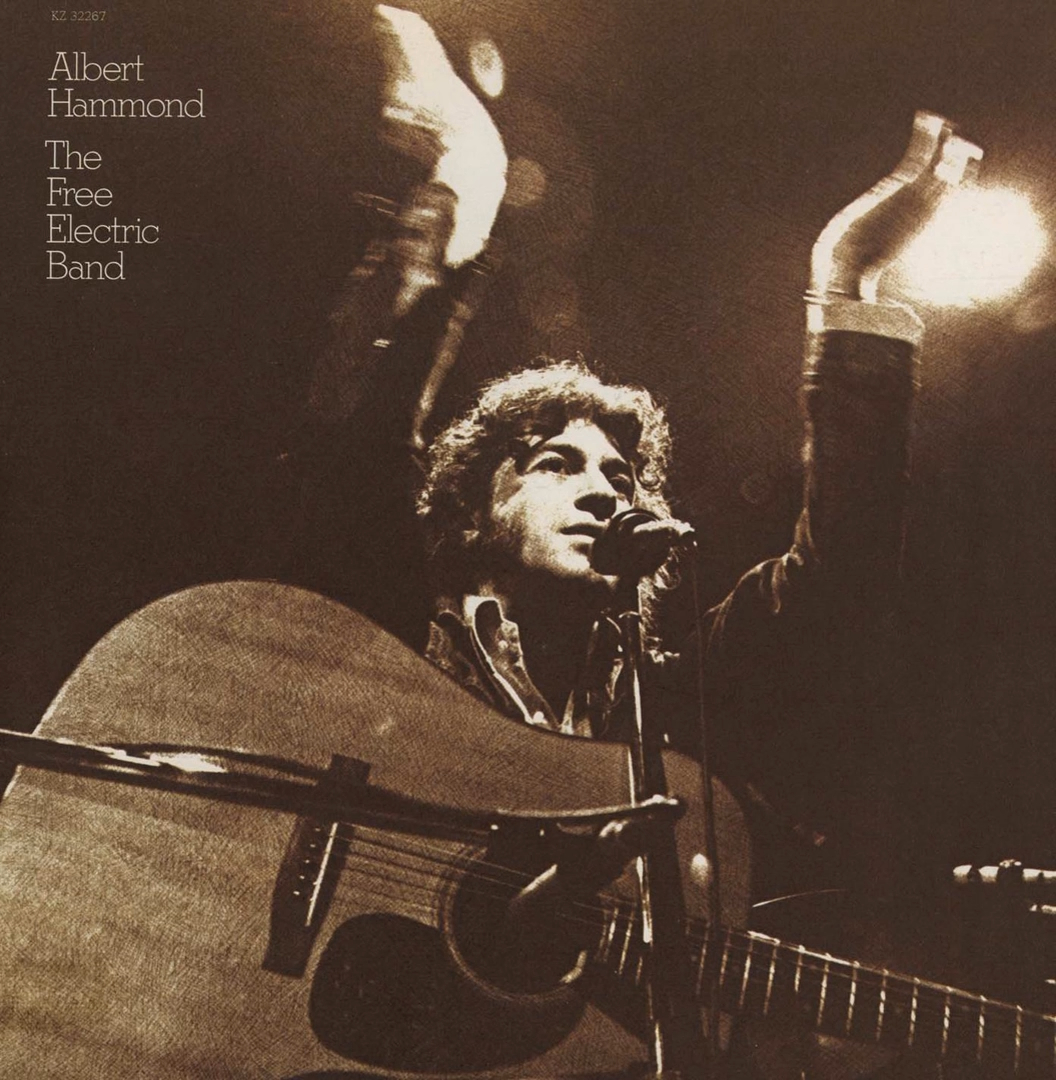

Studio album by Albert Hammond
- Released: 1973
- Genre: Pop rock, soft rock
- Label: Mums Records 32267
- Producer: Albert Hammond

Albert Hammond chronology
It Never Rains in Southern California (1972)	The Free Electric Band (1973)	Albert Hammond (1974)

Professional ratings
Review scores
Source	Rating
Allmusic	3/5 stars

The Free Electric Band is the second studio album by Albert Hammond released by Mums Records. The album barely landed on the Billboard 200 chart, reaching #193.

The title track single hit #48 on the Billboard Hot 100 and #19 on the UK Singles Chart in 1973. The single "The Peacemaker" hit #51 on the Adult Contemporary chart and #80 on the Billboard Hot 100.

Hammond arranged and produced the record himself.

== Track listing ==
All tracks by Albert Hammond & Mike Hazlewood

1. "Smokey Factory Blues"
2. "The Peacemaker"
3. "Woman of the World"
4. "Everything I Want to Do"
5. "Who's for Lunch Today"
6. "The Free Electric Band"
7. "Rebecca"
8. "The Day the British Army Lost the War"
9. "For the Peace of All Mankind"
10. "I Think I'll Go That Way"

== Personnel ==
- Albert Hammond - vocals, guitar
- Jay Lewis, Larry Carlton - guitar
- Joe Osborn - bass guitar
- Jim Gordon - drums
- Michael Omartian - keyboards
- Carol Carmichael and Friends - backing vocals
- The Sid Sharp Strings - strings

== Chart positions ==
Album

Year	Chart	Peak Position
1973	Billboard 200	193

Singles

Year	Single	Chart	Peak Position
1973	"The Free Electric Band"	Billboard Hot 100	48
1973	"The Free Electric Band"	UK Singles Chart	19
1973	"The Peacemaker"	Billboard Hot 100	80
1973	"The Peacemaker"	Adult Contemporary Chart	51
