= John Mackswith =

English sound engineer

John Anthony Mackswith (born 1948, Islington, London) is an English sound engineer.

Since the late 1960s, he has engineered the recordings of an array of notable performers at Landsdowne Studios & Utopia Studios in London and at various studios in Israel, New York City, Canada and the Netherlands.

== Discography ==
=== Sound engineering on ===
- 1966: "Art Gallery" – The Artworks
- 1967: "Let's Go to San Francisco" – The Flower Pot Men
- 1967: "A Walk in the Sky" – The Flower Pot Men
- 1968: "The Voice and Writing of Raymond Froggatt" – Raymond Froggatt
- 1969: "Where Do You Go To (My Lovely)?" – Peter Sarstedt
- 1969: Peter Sarstedt – Peter Sarstedt
- 1969: As Though It Were A Movie – Peter Sarstedt
- 1969: A Way of Life – The Family Dogg
- 1971: Coming from Reality – Sixto Rodriguez
- 1972: Grave New World – Strawbs
- 1973: "Sugar Baby Love" – Rubettes
- 1975: L'Ete Indien (Africa) / Moi J'Ai Dit Non – Joe Dassin
- 1978: The Roger Whittaker Christmas Album – Roger Whittaker
- 1978: PS – Peter Sarstedt
- 1979: Knock on Wood – Amii Stewart
- 1982: Lost And Found (Dave Bartram solo tracks recorded 1982-1985 at Utopia) released 2011
- 1983: Deep Sea Skiving – Bananarama.
- 1985: Politics of Existing – Paul Young
- 1990: Auberge – Chris Rea

== Filmography ==
=== Sound engineering on ===
- 1987: (Film) Withnail and I – David Dundas & Rick Wentworth
- 1995: (TV) The Infiltrator
- 2000: (TV) This Is Personal: The Hunt for the Yorkshire Ripper
