= Leapy Lee =

- Also known as: Lee Graham
- Born: Graham Pulleyblank; 2 July 1939 (age 87); Eastbourne, England
- Genres: Pop, country
- Occupation: Singer
- Instrument: Vocals
- Years active: 1968–2014
- Labels: MCA (United Kingdom); Decca (US)

Lee Graham (born Graham Pulleyblank, 2 July 1939), known professionally as Leapy Lee, is an English singer, notable for his 1968 single "Little Arrows”, which reached No. 2 in the UK Singles Chart, and was a Top 20 country and pop hit in the United States and Canada.

== Career ==
The song "Little Arrows", written by Albert Hammond and Mike Hazlewood, was also the title track of his first album, released in 1968 on Decca Records. It reached No.71 in the Billboard 200 album chart.

"Little Arrows", released in the UK by MCA Records, became a hit, reaching No.2 in the charts. In the US, the record reached No.16 on the Billboard Hot 100 chart and No.11 on the country chart. The record made No.1 on the Canadian country music chart. It sold over three million copies worldwide, and was awarded a gold disc. Although he never reached the US pop charts again, Lee had two more country hits there with "Good Morning" in 1970 and "Every Road Leads Back to You" in 1975.

Between 1999 and 2001, Lee and his family featured prominently in the BBC television series Passport to the Sun, fronted firstly by Liza Tarbuck then by Nadia Sawalha. Around 2006, Lee was a regular columnist with the EuroWeekly News, an English language newspaper based on the Costa del Sol in Spain.

Lee released a 40th anniversary EP, Little Arrows II, on 1 March 2010. In 2014 he appeared on the Channel 5 television show, OAPs Behaving Badly.

== Personal life ==
Lee was born Graham Pulleyblank in Eastbourne, East Sussex, on 2 July 1939. He performs as Leapy Lee, and also uses the names Lee Graham and Leapy Lee Graham.

In July 1970, Lee was arrested after a brawl at the Red Lion pub in Sunningdale, Berkshire pub in which a relief manager was wounded. Lee was sentenced to three years for unlawful wounding, and his friend Alan Lake (an actor and the third husband of actress and singer Diana Dors) received eighteen months for his role in the brawl.

As of 2024, Lee lives in Mallorca and makes occasional returns to the United Kingdom.

== Discography ==
=== Albums ===
Year	Album	Chart positions		Label
Year	Album	US Country	US	Label
1968	Little Arrows	3	71	Decca
1970	Leapy Lee	—	—	Decca
1976	Every Road Leads Back to You	—	—	Bell
2010	Little Arrows II	—	—	HalfpennyStudios.com

=== Singles ===
Year	Single	Peak chart positions						Album
Year	Single	US Country	US	CAN Country	CAN	UK	AUS	Album
1962	"It's All Happening"	—	—	—	—	—	—	—N/a
1966	"King of the Whole Wide World"	—	—	—	—	—	—	—N/a
1967	"The man on the flying trapeze"	—	—	—	—	—	—	—N/a
1968	"Little Arrows"	11	16	1	8	2	2	Little Arrows
1969	"It's All Happening" (re-release)	—	—	—	—	—	90	—N/a
1969	"Here Comes the Rain"	—	—	—	62	—	80	Leapy Lee
1969	"Little Yellow Aeroplane"	—	—	—	—	—	63	Leapy Lee
1970	"Good Morning"	55	—	—	—	29	96	Leapy Lee
1971	"Just Another Night"	—	—	—	—	—	87	—N/a
1971	"I'll Be Your Baby Tonight"	—	—	—	—	—	—	—N/a
1973	"Helena"	—	—	—	—	—	—	—N/a
1974	"Every Road Leads Back to You"	82	—	—	—	55 (Note: Chart position is from the official UK "Breakers List".)	—	Every Road Leads Back to You

== See also ==
- List of 1960s one-hit wonders in the United States
- List of performers on Top of the Pops
