= Pierce Turner =

Irish singer-songwriter (born 1949)

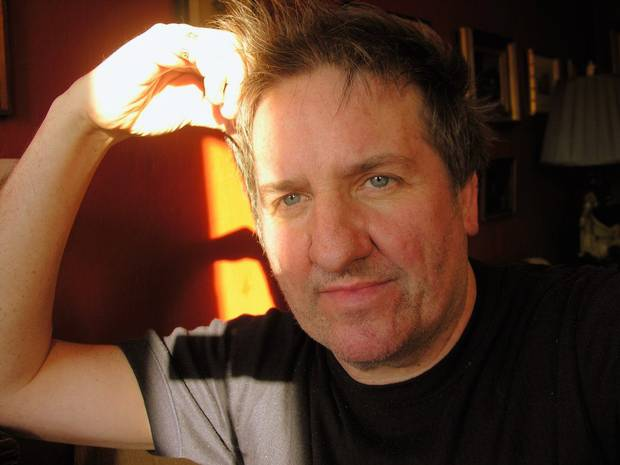

Background information
- Genres: Folk, rock
- Occupations: Singer, musician, songwriter
- Instruments: Piano, guitar, saxophone, tin-whistle, vocals
- Years active: 1970s–present
- Labels: Beggars Banquet; Sony BMG; LoveCat Music
- Spouse: Clare Turner
- Website: pierceturner.com

Pierce Turner is an Irish singer-songwriter. After forming a duo with Larry Kirwan he went solo in the mid-1980s and has since released several albums

== Biography ==
Turner grew up in the port town of Wexford, where his mother ran a retail outlet that sold recorded music, and led her own band. A classically trained musician, by the age of seven he was a member of a traditional Irish tin-whistle group, and at eight, he was playing in a brass and reed orchestra. He also sang in his local church choir, and the influence of hymn and plain-chant singing has been evident throughout his later career.

His first professional job was as a musician with the pop showband The Arrows. He later moved to New York City and formed The Major Thinkers with fellow Wexfordian Larry Kirwan (now the frontman of Black 47), and recorded several albums, also performing as Turner and Kirwan. Turner and Kirwan released two albums – Bootleg and Absolutely and Completely – the latter issued on the Cosmos label as well as a single "Neck and Neck"/"When Starlings Fly" recorded at Electric Lady Studios/New York and issued on the Audio-Fidelity subsidiary label Thimble in 1973.

His first solo album, It's Only a Long Way Across (1987), was produced by American avant-garde composer Philip Glass. It was nominated for 'Best Debut Issued by an Independent Record Company' at the New York Music Awards. He went on to make two more albums for Beggars Banquet: Sky & the Ground (1989) and Now Is Heaven (1991). This album was produced by John Simon. In 1997, the Baltik imprint issued the album Angelic Language.

Turner embarked on what he called his Parlour Tour, performing in over seventy private houses in Ireland, accompanied by London-based Wicklow film maker Colin Murnane who was making the documentary The Song for the Year (2007).

Other songs by Turner were featured in the film Snakes and Ladders and the HBO TV show The Wire (his version of "Dirty Old Town"). Christy Moore recorded Turner's songs "Wicklow Hills" and "Musha God Help Her". Moore's 2004 box set includes the track I Love the Way Pierce Turner Sings.

His album The Boy to Be With was released in 2006 and includes Turner's tribute to late Irish bluesman Rory Gallagher.

Turner commented on his lack of commercial success in 1993:

I find that the American people really like what I do when I'm put in front of an audience of normal people, but when the recording industry gets my records, they tend to think the public won't understand or won't care about it. Maybe it's not happy enough or something. There's no use complaining about it. I'm choosing to go around that and go directly to the people.

In late 2011, work commenced on a new collection, Songs foR a veRRy small OrchestRa, recorded in Ireland and released in 2012. Turner described the sound of the record as "Baroque Pop". The song "Yogi with a Broken Heart" contains a synthesizer accompaniment from Philip Glass, with whom Turner had performed the song at Carnegie Hall in 2010.

In 2019, Turner began writing a column for the Wexford People and in 2024 he published a book of short stories, Living by the River, inspired by his experiences living by the River Slaney in Wexford town.

== Discography ==
- It's Only a Long Way Across (1987), Beggars Banquet
- Sky & the Ground (1989), Beggars Banquet
- Now Is Heaven (1991), Beggars Banquet
- Mañana in Manhattan ... Live (1994), Virtual
- Snakes and Ladders 1995 soundtrack BMG
- Angelic Language (1997), Baltik
- 3 Minute World (2001)
- Mr. Smith (2004), LoveCat
- The Boy to Be With (2004), 5030
- Catch a Wave mini-album (2008), Pierce Turner
- Beyond The Blue (2010), LoveCat
- SoNgs for a VeRRy SmaLL ORchesTRa (2012)
- Love Can't Always Be Articulate (2016)
- Vinegar Hill (2019)
- Terrible Good (2022)

Compilations

- Pierce Turner (1998), Beggars Banquet
