= The House With the Whitewashed Gable =

Single by Joe Dolan
- B-side: "Work Day Blues"
- Released: 10 February 1967
- Genre: country
- Length: 2:15
- Label: Pye
- Songwriter: Neil Levenson

Joe Dolan singles chronology
"Pretty Brown Eyes" (1966)	"The House With the Whitewashed Gable" (1967)	"Tar and Cement" (1967)

"The House With the Whitewashed Gable" is a 1967 country song written by Neil Levenson and performed by Irish showband singer Joe Dolan and his band, the Drifters.

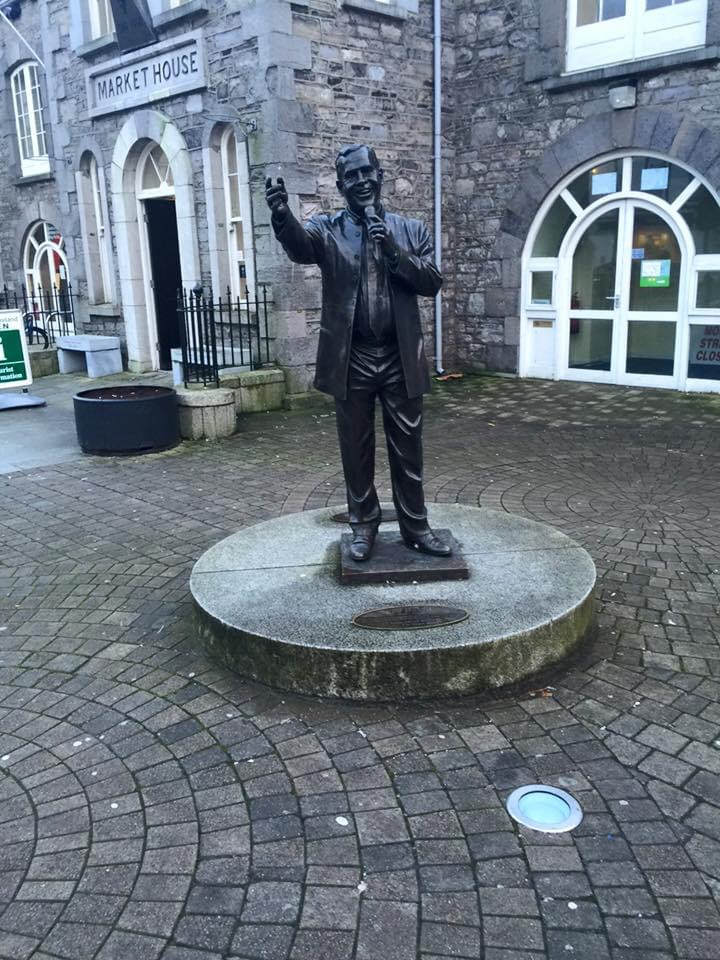
Statue of Joe Dolan in Mullingar

== Song history ==
The song is based on the Ron Dante song "221 East Maple," with the typically American street address changed to the rural Irish setting of a farmhouse with a gable covered in whitewash.

"The House With the Whitewashed Gable" was released on 10 February 1967, reaching number one in the Irish Singles Chart on 20 February 1967.
