= It Never Rains in Southern California (album) =

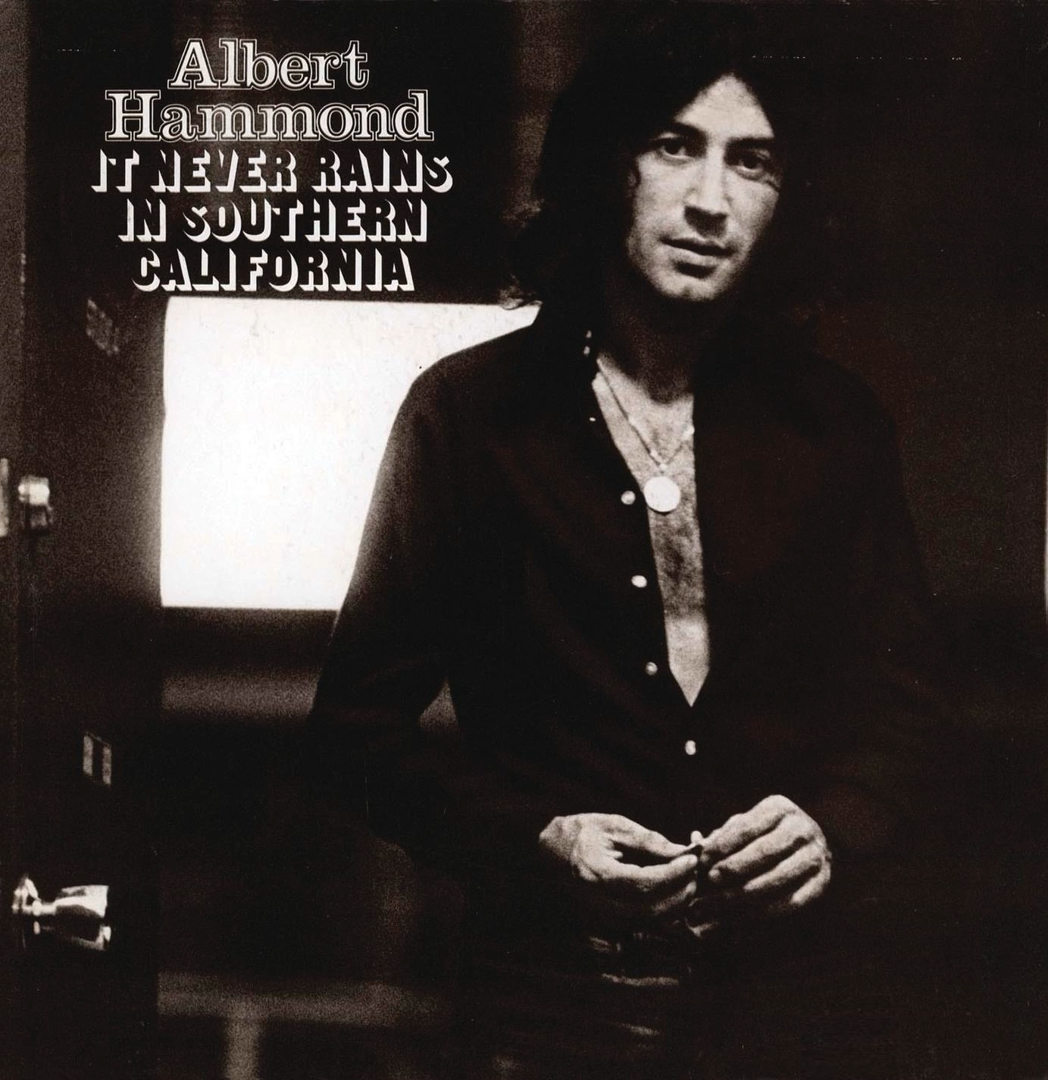

Studio album by Albert Hammond
- Released: October 21, 1972
- Genres: Pop rock, soft rock
- Label: Mums 31905
- Producers: Albert Hammond, Don Altfeld

Albert Hammond chronology
It Never Rains in Southern California (1972)	The Free Electric Band (1973)

Professional ratings
Review scores
Source	Rating
AllMusic	4.5/5 stars

It Never Rains in Southern California is the debut album by Albert Hammond, released in 1972. The title song was a hit, and the album included the first release of the song "The Air That I Breathe", which became a hit when it was covered by the English band the Hollies in 1974.

== Description ==
It Never Rains in Southern California was released by Mums Records in 1972. The album landed on the Billboard 200 chart, reaching No. 77.

The title song hit No. 2 on the Adult Contemporary chart, No. 5 on the Billboard Hot 100, and No. 51 on the UK Singles Chart in 1972. The single "Down by the River" hit No. 38 on the Adult Contemporary chart and No. 91 on the Billboard Hot 100. The single "If You Gotta Break Another Heart" reached No. 63 on the Billboard Hot 100 in 1973.

"The Air That I Breathe" would go on to become a major hit for British band the Hollies in 1974.

The album was produced by Hammond and Don Altfeld and was arranged by Michael Omartian.

Hammond (talking about the single, It Never Rains in Southern California): "One of my most important songs not only because I think it's a great song and I love it and I think it tells the story of my life in a way, but also because I was the artist, the producer, the writer – I mean, everything was right, it was just like the right thing. If I hadn't had that, I might have got slowly downhill, you know."

== Track listing ==
All tracks by Albert Hammond and Mike Hazlewood.

1. "Listen to the World"
2. "If You Gotta Break Another Heart"
3. "From Great Britain to L.A."
4. "Brand New Day"
5. "Anyone Here in the Audience"
6. "It Never Rains in Southern California"
7. "Names, Tags, Numbers and Labels"
8. "Down by the River"
9. "The Road to Understanding"
10. "The Air That I Breathe"

== Personnel ==
- Albert Hammond - lead and backing vocals, guitar
- Jay Lewis, Larry Carlton - guitar
- Joe Osborn, Ray Pohlman - bass guitar
- Hal Blaine, Jim Gordon - drums
- Michael Omartian - keyboards
- Don Altfeld - percussion
- Carol Carmichael - backing vocals
- Alan Beutler, Jackie Kelso, Tommy Scott - flute

== Charts ==
Album

Year	Chart	Peak position
1972	Australia (Kent Music Report)	62
1972	Billboard 200	77

Singles

Year	Single	Chart	Peak position
1972	"Down by the River"	Billboard Hot 100	91
1972	"Down by the River"	Adult Contemporary Chart	38
1972	"It Never Rains in Southern California"	Billboard Hot 100	5
1972	"It Never Rains in Southern California"	Adult Contemporary Chart	2
1972	"It Never Rains in Southern California"	UK Singles Chart	51
1973	"If You Gotta Break Another Heart"	Billboard Hot 100	63
