= Trish McAdam =

Irish screen director

- Born: 17 June 1955 (age 70); Dublin
- Occupation: Film director

Trish McAdam (born 17 June 1955) is an Irish screen director.

McAdam was born in Dublin. She got interested in working in film after living in New York City and working with both the filmmaker Vivienne Dick and the photographer Nan Goldin. Her early films in the 1980s included the short Berlin. Since then she has gone on to direct the feature film Snakes and Ladders and more recently the film Confinement. McAdam also made the documentary series Hoodwinked: Irish Women Since the 1920s.

== Works ==
- 1985 The Drip (Short)
- 1986 The Big Time (Short)
- 1989 Berlin (Documentary short)
- 1996 Snakes and Ladders
- 1998 Hoodwinked (TV Mini-Series documentary)
- 2002 Flirting with the Light (Documentary)
- 2013 Liu Xiaobo: No Enemies No Hatred (Documentary short)
- 2015 Strangers to Kindness (Documentary short)
- 2015 A Poem to Liu Xia (Documentary short)
- 2019 Confinement (Documentary short)
