= Make Me an Island =

Single by Joe Dolan
- B-side: "If You Care a Little Bit About Me"
- Released: May 9, 1969
- Recorded: 1969
- Length: 3:00
- Label: Pye
- Songwriter: Albert Hammond * Mike Hazlewood.

"Make Me an Island" is a 1969 hit song by Irish pop singer Joe Dolan, written by Albert Hammond and Mike Hazlewood. The song peaked at number two in Ireland and number three in the UK. A Canadian musician named Tom Northcott released a competing version of the song on Warner Bros.-Seven Arts Records and New Syndrome Records. It reached #8 on Canada's RPM CanCon charts, June 30, 1969.

== Charts ==
Charts (1969)	Peak position
Austria (Ö3 Austria Top 40)	17
Belgium (Ultratop 50 Flanders)	2
Belgium (Ultratop 50 Wallonia)	16
Ireland (IRMA)	2
Netherlands (Dutch Top 40)	10
Netherlands (Single Top 100)	11
South Africa (Springbok)	2
UK Singles Chart	3
West Germany (GfK)	15

=== Sales ===
Region	Certification	Certified units/sales
Ireland	—	6,000

=== Cover versions ===
Karel Gott - "Poslouchej Amore" (Make Me An Island)
