= Down by the River (Albert Hammond song) =

Song written and composed by Albert Hammond, Mike Hazlewood

"Down by the River" is a song by Albert Hammond that was released as the lead single from his 1972 debut album It Never Rains in Southern California. Written by Hammond himself, it became his own debut charting hit in 1972. The song deals with ecology as the subject matter.

Upon re-release in 1975, it became an international hit for Hammond, charting in the top ten in West Germany and Switzerland and the top twenty in Austria.

== Song composition ==
The song is told as a first-person narrative by Hammond. The storyline is that he and his lover take a camping trip down by a river, where they both decide to go swimming. The next day, both feel ill, having not slept well all night, and go for a morning walk. During their walk, they see "silver fish lay on its side" and wonder how it died. They learn how after seeing a doctor, who tells them "only foolish people go down by the river".

The song goes on to describe the negative environmental impact if current practices continue ("the banks will soon be black and dead, and where the otter raised his head, will be a clean white skull instead").

== Charts ==
| Chart (1972) | Peak position |
|---|---|
| Australia (Kent Music Report) | 18 |
| US Billboard Hot 100 | 91 |
| US Easy Listening (Billboard) | 38 |

Down by the River (re-recorded version)
| Chart (1975) | Peak position |
|---|---|
| Austria (Ö3 Austria Top 40) | 11 |
| Belgium (Ultratop 50 Flanders) | 26 |
| Netherlands (Single Top 100) | 17 |
| Switzerland (Schweizer Hitparade) | 4 |
| West Germany (GfK) | 8 |
