= Joe Dolan =

Irish singer (1939–2007)

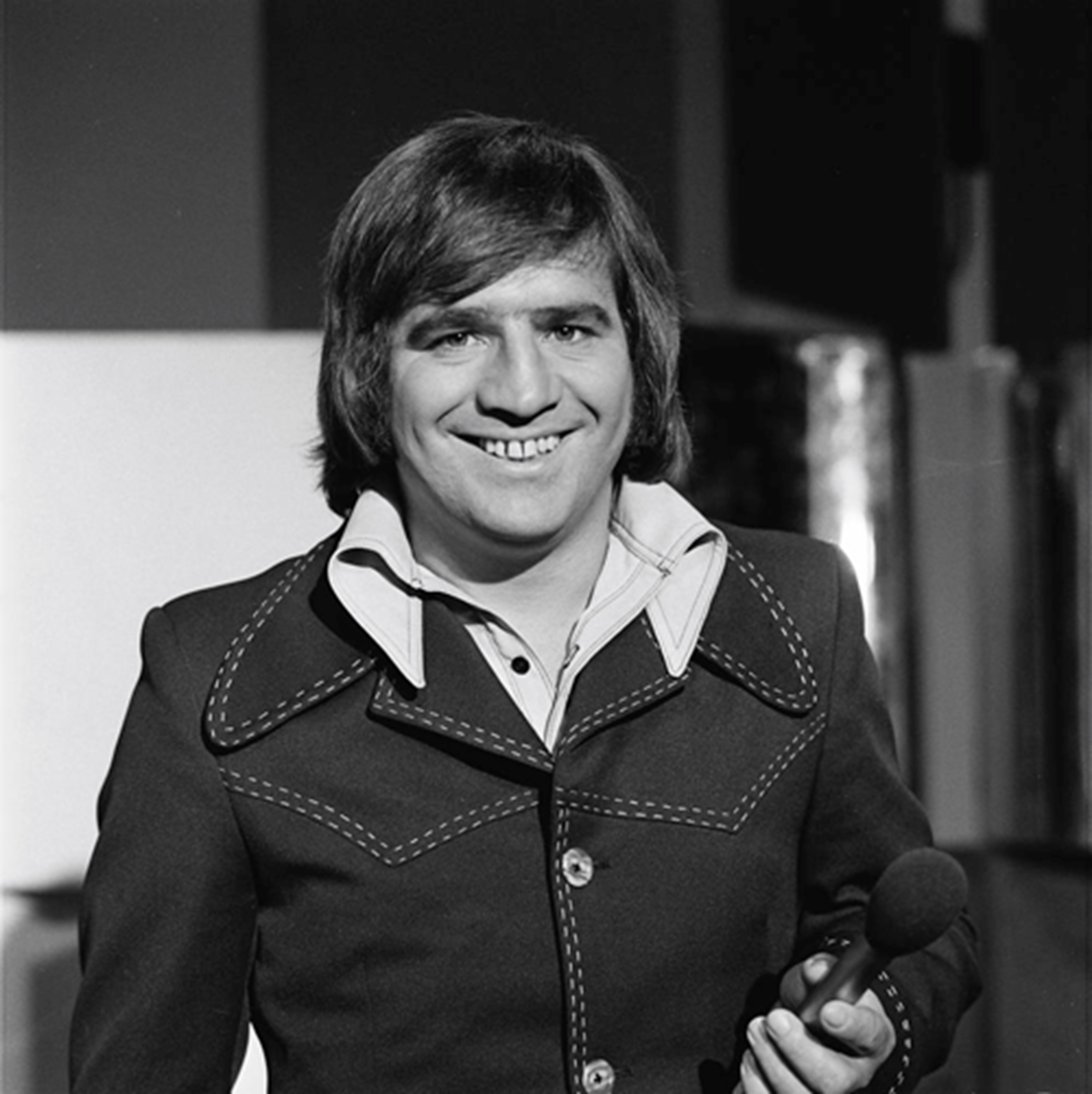
- Dolan on TopPop, 1975
- Born: Joseph Francis Robert Dolan; 16 October 1939; Mullingar, Ireland
- Died: 26 December 2007 (aged 68); Dublin, Ireland
- Other name: The Roaring Hyena
- Occupations: Band lead singer, solo singer
- Years active: 1958–2007
- Musical career
- Genres: Pop, rock, country
- Website: www.joedolan.com

Joseph Francis Robert Dolan (16 October 1939 – 26 December 2007) was an Irish singer, entertainer and recording artist. Chiefly known in Ireland for his association with showbands and for his innovative style and high tenor singing voice, he had a wide appeal with many international fans. His energetic and charismatic stage performances influenced his long standing advertising slogan: "There's no show like the Joe show".

The only Irish singer to reach number one in the 1960s, 1970s, 1980s and 1990s, Dolan was a persistent presence in the music charts in Ireland and overseas.

== Early life and family ==
Dolan was born at the County Hospital, now known as the Midland Regional Hospital, Mullingar, County Westmeath on 16 October 1939, the youngest of nine children in a Roman Catholic family. His father, a bicycle shop proprietor, died when Joe was ten; his mother when he was nineteen. He sang in school, and his mother had encouraged him to take up the piano. He made his first stage appearance at a talent show held in a marquee on the Fair Green in his native Mullingar.

== Voice ==
Dolan's voice was high with a comprehensive range without the use of falsetto and he made comprehensive use of a technique known as melisma. Vocal ranges such as this were not common in the 1960s and 1970s but were later made popular by artists such as Mariah Carey, Stevie Wonder and Whitney Houston, among others. The Irish chat show legend Gay Byrne famously described Dolan's voice as "butter mixed with honey".

== Career ==
=== The Drifters ===
In 1958, as well as securing his first (and last) "real" job as a compositor in the local Westmeath Examiner newspaper, Dolan got his first guitar. After learning some skills on the instrument, he and his saxophone-playing brother Ben started to play in local bands. They soon formed a band of their own – The Drifters. Not long afterward, the band was renamed Joe Dolan and the Drifters and finally Joe Dolan and His Drifters to avoid legal action from the American band of the same name.

The Irish musical landscape in the 1960s was dominated by the showbands. The first single "The Answer to Everything", (previously released as a B side by Del Shannon) was released in September 1964, reaching number 4 in the Irish charts. Dolan and his band were managed by Seamus Casey. In the summer of 1968, however, some of the band left, with Dolan and Casey citing "musical differences" as the reason, although in the official biography by Ronan Casey (Seamus Casey's son) further elaboration includes references to unhappiness about financial issues.

=== Tours ===
Dolan's first US tour was in 1965 and followed an offer, which he refused, to play in Las Vegas. Instead, he decided to play a whistle-stop tour of Irish-American venues in places such as Chicago, New York and Boston. An added benefit to this string of engagements was the opportunity to hear American music which hadn't yet been played in the UK and Ireland. The first song gleaned in this fashion was the Jim Reeves song, (That's When I see the Blue in Your) Pretty Brown Eyes which Dolan released on the Pye label in 1966.

A second US tour in 1967 led an offer to appear in Las Vegas, but he turned it down. Eventually in 1980 he accepted $10,000 a week plus board and lodgings to perform for six weeks over September and October at the Continental Lounge of the Silverbird Casino on the Strip in Las Vegas. Eventually playing 64 shows and selling out most of them, he and his band returned to Ireland to be immediately rebooked for Vegas in January 1981. Although he turned down subsequent offers to return to Vegas, other venues approached him with increased offers, thinking he was merely hunting around for the best deal, but Dolan refused them all. Several other attempts were made through the years to entice him back but he never returned – except on holiday.

In 1978, he became the first Irish artist and one of the first Western acts to tour the USSR. He played 23 concerts in 23 nights in Moscow, Leningrad and the Moldovan capital, Kishinev.

Dolan toured the segregation era in South Africa and was on a UN blacklist for defying the artists' ban.

=== Recordings ===
After reforming the band Dolan recorded a song called "Make Me an Island", written by the songwriting duo Albert Hammond and Mike Hazlewood, for Pye Records in conjunction with Shaftesbury Publishing. The track was a hit in the UK and led to Dolan's first appearance on the BBC's Top of the Pops which helped to make him "the biggest Irish star in the world at that time". The song eventually became a number one hit in 14 countries as well as reaching Number 3 in the UK, becoming Joe Dolan's only British Top 10 hit and one of only four hit singles Dolan ever had in the UK (all of these hits performed better in the Irish Charts).

In Ireland, the song peaked at number 2 in August 1969, the same week it was Number 3 in the UK. After the recording of Make Me An Island Dolan was approached and signed by the MAM Agency whose major star was Tom Jones.

Follow-up singles "Teresa" and "You're Such a Good Looking Woman" also made an impact. Other single releases such as "It Makes No Difference" and "You and the Looking Glass" were not big hits at home in Ireland or in the UK, but they were international successes. A collaboration with writers Roberto Danova and Peter Yellowstone in the mid-1970s produced more singles which made little impact on the British domestic market but did well internationally. "Sweet Little Rock 'n' Roller" (1974) was the first of a number of reasonable successes for this team but wasn't a major hit in the UK until later recorded by Showaddywaddy, who had a Top 20 hit with the song in 1979.

His next single, "Lady in Blue" was his biggest ever hit, winning five gold records and selling one million copies. It charted in parts of continental Europe, Africa and South America but not in Ireland or the UK. Further hits including "Crazy Woman", "Sister Mary", "Midnight Lover", "Hush Hush Maria" and "I Need You" followed. Reflective songs such as "If I Could Put My Life on Paper" were a collaborative attempt to show a more maturing artist, whilst definitive versions of songs such as "Danny Boy" maintained a touch of Irish on disc and in concert. In any given month Dolan could be touring the Middle East one week, Australia the next, then South Africa and then back to Europe and Ireland. Further international successes and tours followed, with hits such as "More and More" and "It's You, It's You, It's You".

With his own record label, studio and material Dolan became one of the biggest selling independent artists of the 1990s with albums such as 'Endless Magic' keeping him near the top of the charts. At the end of the decade he refined his voice for the 21st century when he hooked up with EMI for a series of albums (such as Joe's 90s, 21st Century Joe and Home Grown) which saw him tackle more contemporary music from acts as diverse as Oasis, Pulp, Blur, U2, Bruce Springsteen, The Coral, R.E.M., Mundy and his old pal Robbie Williams. At the Oxegen Festival 2009, Blur's Damon Albarn dedicated the song "The Universal" to Dolan.

== Personal life ==
Dolan never married and dealt with speculation about his sexuality throughout his life. He spent much of his life dismissing persistent rumours that he was gay. The official biography suggests that he had a quiet offstage presence and preferred to keep romances out of the public eye but cites a long relationship with Isabella Fogarty whom he met in 1977, started dating in the 1980s and subsequently lived with. She was with him when he became ill on 25 December 2007.

In September 1970, Dolan and his band were performing at the Wookie Hollow Club in Liverpool. Dolan and a member of his road crew stayed in the venue for drinks and to chat to their fans. Some people at a nearby table were attempting to bully the (by now closed) bar into providing them with champagne. Dolan joked that they should come back in a few hours for a "champagne breakfast". The men took exception to this and became abusive. Dolan and his companion tried to leave but were prevented from doing so. During the following fracas Dolan was headbutted (breaking his nose), kicked, punched, and slammed into lavatory fittings and a wall in a sustained attack that was halted only when the sound of police sirens could be heard. It took six weeks for the singer to recover well enough to return to work. The club was sued but went into liquidation. The police attempted to identify the perpetrators and held identity parades that Dolan attended, but no-one was ever prosecuted.

In October 1976, Dolan and a group of friends were flying with Aer Lingus to Corfu for a golfing trip. On several occasions during the flight, Dolan was moving around talking to other passengers who knew him. One of the party remembers they were "quite merry". The singer was asked several times by cabin staff to return to his seat and, finally, after being threatened with being restrained, he did so. Upon landing, he attempted to leave the airport without his luggage and passport but was prevented from doing so by security staff, one of whom drew his pistol and pointed it at Dolan.

The tour operator subsequently received a fax from Aer Lingus refusing to fly the star back to Dublin. Newspaper headlines in Ireland proclaimed the star's airline ban for life although, as it transpired, the ban lasted for less than two years. It was eventually lifted after the airline negotiated with the star following his continued references to it on stage and in the media.

=== Illness and death ===
Dolan's health began to decline after he underwent a hip replacement in 2005, which put him off the road for 12 months and led to the discovery of Type 2 Diabetes, which appeared to account for the low energy levels he had been experiencing. Following a discussion with Keith Duffy of the boy band Boyzone, the hip bone that was replaced was signed and auctioned for €650, the proceeds being given to Irish Autism Action. Dolan returned to his schedule in 2006, but he began to report further signs of low energy. Doctors diagnosed a low blood platelet count and Dolan began a series of blood transfusions. After each, he felt better for a period, but would eventually begin to feel weaker again. At this same time, Dolan was also suffering from unexplained nosebleeds. In Autumn 2007, on advice from his doctors, Dolan cancelled his Vicar Street concerts due to "exhaustion".

On 16 December 2007, the front page of the Sunday Independent reported that Dolan was suffering from a "bad virus" and had been forced to cancel his entire Christmas tour. Dolan's website received messages from well wishers in the wake of the article, which was reproduced in several newspapers the following day. Despite the blood transfusions and other medical interventions, Dolan became weaker and he was finally discharged from the Mater Private Hospital in Dublin on 23 December 2007 in a wheelchair.

Dolan spent Christmas Day 2007 at his home in Foxrock in southeast Dublin with some friends. Later that evening, his illness suddenly worsened, and he was rushed by ambulance to the Mater Hospital. En route to the hospital, Dolan suffered a massive intracerebral haemorrhage, at which he became unconscious, and was connected to life support equipment upon his arrival. At approximately 14:30 hours on St Stephen's Day, surrounded by family and friends, the machines were switched off and Dolan died within 20 minutes, on 26 December 2007, never regaining consciousness. He was pronounced dead at 15:03 hours. He was 68 years old.

His funeral mass was held at the Cathedral of Christ the King, Mullingar on 29 December 2007. Attendees of Dolan's funeral included singer Ronnie Drew from The Dubliners, comedian Frank Carson, snooker player Dennis Taylor, and Albert Reynolds, former dancehall impresario and Taoiseach.

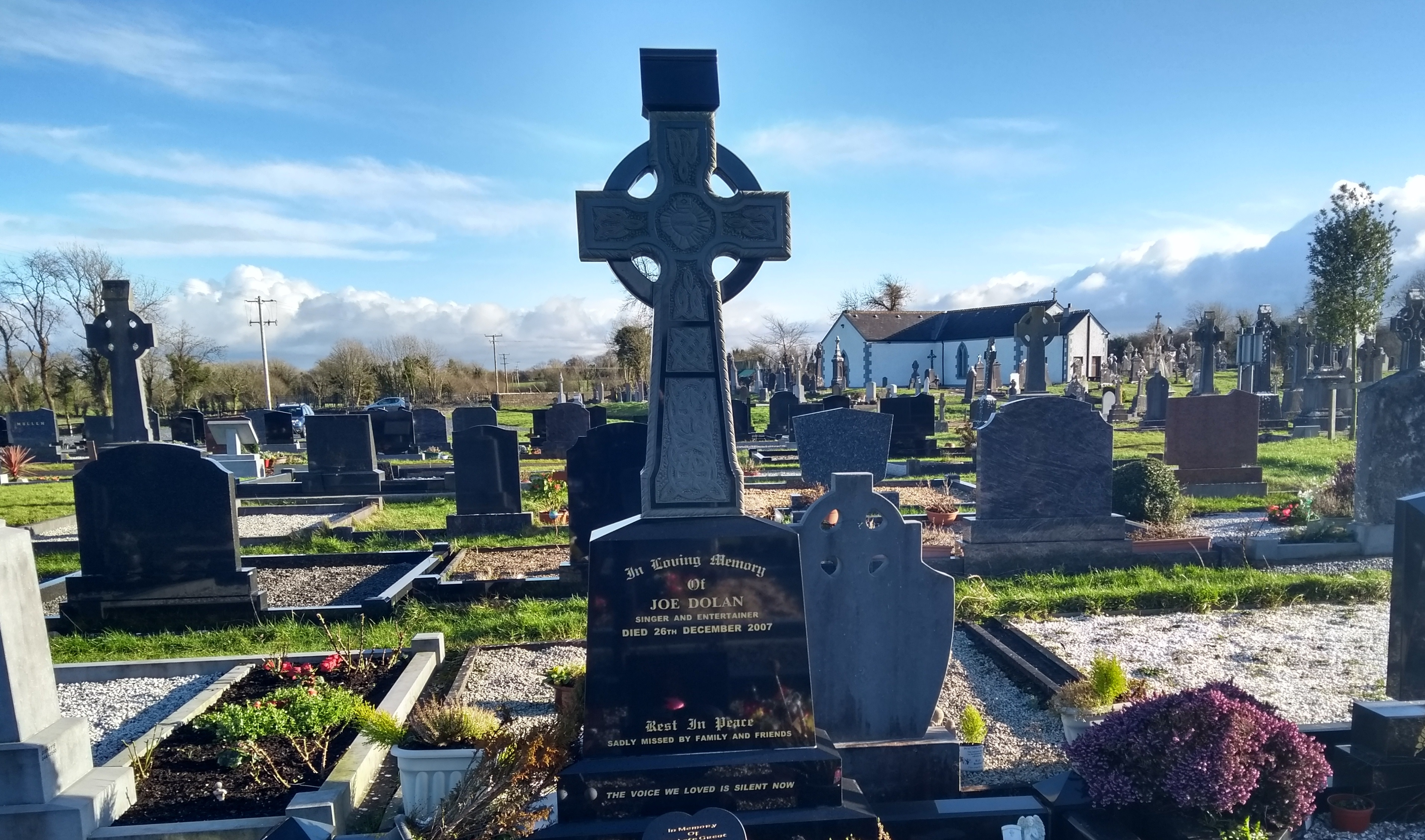
Grave of Joe Dolan at Walshestown Cemetery, Mullingar

Dolan is interred in Walshestown Cemetery, Walshestown North, County Westmeath.

== Legacy ==
A 540 metres (1,770 ft) bridge was named after him in the Clonmore Industrial Estate in his hometown of Mullingar, it opened officially on 6 September 2010. It is the second longest bridge in the Republic of Ireland. There is a statue of Dolan in Mullingar's Market Square.

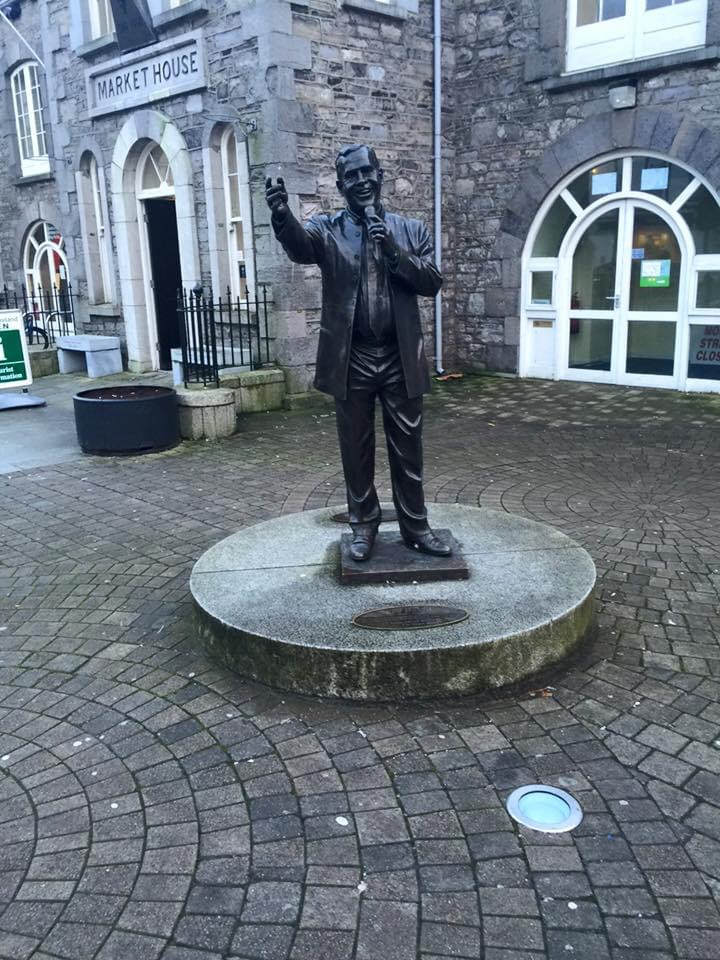
Statue of Joe Dolan in Mullingar

Dolan's hip bone is the only body part to ever be sold on eBay. The singer had initially sold his bone at a charity auction before his death and it was later sold on eBay.

== Discography ==
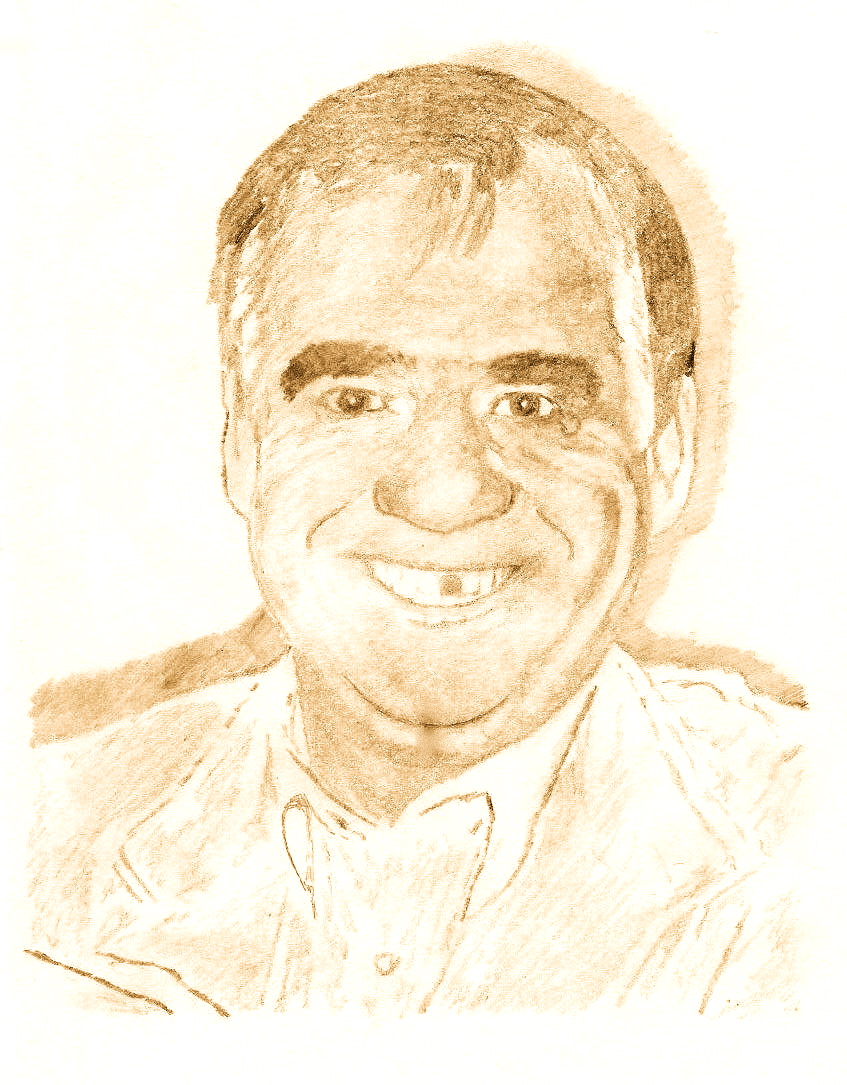
Portrait of Joe Dolan

=== Studio albums ===
- The Answer to Everything (1968) (credited to Joe Dolan and the Drifters Showband)
- Make Me an Island (1969)
- You're Such a Good Lookin' Woman (1970)
- Lady in Blue (1975)
- Sister Mary (1976)
- Midnight Lover (1978)
- Turn Out the Light (1979)
- More and More (1982)
- Here and Now (1983)
- Always on My Mind (1985)
- This Is My Life (1987)
- Always Loved You (1990)
- Can't Give Enough (1994)
- Endless Magic (1997)
- Joe's 90's (1998)
- 21st Century Joe (1999)
- Home Grown (2003)
- Double 'O' Joe (2004)
- Let There Be Love (2007)

=== Compilation albums ===
- Joe Dolan's Greatest Hits (1968)
- Golden Hour of Joe Dolan - Vol. 1 (1974)
- Golden Hour of Joe Dolan - Vol. 2 (1975)
- I Need You (And Other Great Hits) (1979)
- Joe Dolan at His Best (1980)
- The Story of Joe Dolan (1993)
- The Singles+ (1998)
- No Better Man - His Greatest Hits (2001)
- Yours Faithfully (2003)
- Make Me an Island - The Pye Anthology (2004)
- Legends of Irish Music (2007)
- The Platinum Collection (2008)
- Joe Dolan, Orchestrated (2016)
- Joe Dolan, Orchestrated Volume 2 (2017)

=== Hit singles ===
Year	Title	Peak chart positions						Album
Year	Title	IRE	BEL	GER	NED	SA	UK	Album
1964	"The Answer to Everything" (with The Drifters Showband)	4	—	—	—	—	—	The Answer to Everything
1965	"I Love You More and More Everyday" (with The Drifters)	3	—	—	—	—	—	Non-LP single
1965	"My Own Peculiar Way" / "Don't Ever Let That Chance Go By" (with The Drifters Showband)	2	—	—	—	—	—	Non-LP single
1965	"Aching Breaking Heart" (with The Drifters)	2	—	—	—	—	—	Non-LP single
1966	Two of a Kind E.P.	10	—	—	—	—	—	Non-LP single
1966	"Pretty Brown Eyes" (with The Drifters)	1	—	—	—	—	—	Non-LP single
1967	"The House with the Whitewashed Gable" (with The Drifters)	1	—	—	—	—	—	Non-LP single
1967	"Tar and Cement"	3	—	—	—	—	—	The Answer to Everything
1968	"Love of the Common People" (with The Drifters)	8	—	—	—	—	—	Non-LP single
1969	"Make Me an Island"	2	2	15	10	2	3	Make Me an Island
1969	"Teresa"	1	6	38	Tip	—	20	Non-LP single
1970	"You're Such a Good Looking Woman"	4	3	—	20	—	17	You're Such a Good Looking Woman
1970	"It Makes No Difference"	11	—	—	—	—	—	Non-LP single
1971	"You and the Looking Glass"	—	—	—	—	12	—	You're Such a Good Looking Woman
1972	"Take the Money and Run"	19	—	—	—	—	—	Non-LP single
1973	"Sweet Little Rock 'n' Roller"	14	—	—	—	—	—	Lady in Blue
1975	"Most Wanted Man in the USA"	12	—	—	—	—	—	Lady in Blue
1975	"Lady in Blue" / "My Darling Michelle"	—	2	—	5	1	—	Lady in Blue
1976	"Sister Mary" (with Kelly Marie - uncredited)/ "You Belong to Me Baby"	1	—	—	—	—	—	Sister Mary
1977	"Hush Hush Maria"	—	—	—	—	1	—	Lady in Blue
1977	"I Need You"	1	20		21	1	43	Midnight Lover
1978	"Little Boy Big Man"	—	—	—	—	9	—	Midnight Lover
1979	"My Love"	27	—	—	—	1	—	Turn Out the Light
1979	"Silent Night"	2	—	—	—	—	—	Non-LP single
1981	"More and More"	1	—	—	—	1	—	More and More
1981	"It's You It's You It's You"	3	—	—	—	1	96	More and More
1982	"It's Only Make Believe"	13	—	—	—	—	—	Non-LP single
1983	"Deeper and Deeper"	10	—	—	—	—	—	Non-LP single
1984	"Sometimes When We Touch"	22	—	—	—	—	—	Here and Now
1984	"Come Back Home"	19	—	—	—	—	—	Non-LP single
1987	"Don't Set Me Free"	17	—	—	—	—	—	This Is My Life
1988	"Take Me I'm Yours"	9	—	—	—	—	—	Non-LP single
1989	"Wait 'til the Clouds Roll By (Jenny)"	20	—	—	—	—	—	Non-LP single
1990	"She Doesn't Live Here Anymore"	11	—	—	—	—	—	Always Loved You
1993	"Ciara"	28	—	—	—	—	—	Can't Give Enough
1997	"Good Looking Woman" (duet with Dustin)	1	—	—	—	—	—	Non-LP single
1998	"The Universal"	19	—	—	—	—	—	Non-LP single
2008	"Let There Be Love"	12	—	—	—	—	—	Let There Be Love

Others

- 1966: "I'll Sit on Your Doorstep"
- 1970: "The Boola Boola"
- 1971: "Sometimes a Man Just Has to Cry"
- 1971: "You and the Looking Glass"
- 1972: "Here We Go Again"
- 1974: "16 Brothers"
- 1975: "Crazy Woman"
- 1978: "Unchained Melody"
- 1978: "Don't Ever Change Your Mind"
- 1994: "Somebody to Call My Girl"
- 1996: "I'll Give All My Love to You"
- 1997: "Endless Magic"
- 1998: "Disco 2000"
- 1998: "Place Your Hands"
- 1999: "Everybody Hurts"
- 1999: "Brilliant Disguise"
- 2001: "Better Man"
- 2002: "Dreaming of You"
- 2003: "Yours Faithfully"
- 2004: "Little Green Bag"
- 2007: Joe Dolan Tribute EP (4 tracks)
- 2008: "Oh Holy Night"

== Bibliography ==
- Casey, Ronan, Joe Dolan, The Official Biography, Penguin Ireland 2008, ISBN 978-1-84488-196-3
