= You're Such a Good Looking Woman =

1970 song by Joe Dolan

"You're Such a Good Looking Woman" is a song by Irish singer Joe Dolan. The song was written by Albert Hammond and Mike Hazlewood and produced by Geoffrey Everitt. It was released in 1970 becoming an international hit for Dolan, peaking at number 4 on the Irish Singles Chart. It also reached number 3 on Ultratop, number 20 on the Dutch Top 40 and number 17 on the UK Singles Chart. The song featured in the 2021 Disney film "Cruella" as well as the 2018 film "Birthmarked".

The song has been covered many times including a version by David Ray & The Daylight Super Band.

Dolan revived the song in a novelty single with the character Dustin the Turkey. This version was retitled "Good Looking Woman" and credited to Dustin & Joe Dolan.

== Charts ==
Charts (1970)	Peak position
Australia (ARIA)	18
Belgium (Ultratop 50 Flanders)	3
Irish Singles Chart	4
Netherlands (Single Top 100)	16
Sweden Tio i topp	8
UK Singles Chart	17
