= I'm a Train =

Single by Albert Hammond

from the album Albert Hammond
- B-side: "Brand New Day"
- Released: 16 March 1974
- Genre: Pop rock, soft rock
- Length: 3:16
- Label: Mums Records 2150
- Songwriters: Albert Hammond, Mike Hazlewood
- Producers: Albert Hammond, Roy Halee

Albert Hammond singles chronology
"Half a Million Miles from Home" (1973)	"I'm a Train" (1974)	"I Don't Wanna Die in an Air Disaster" (1974)

"I'm a Train" is a song written by Albert Hammond and Mike Hazlewood and performed by Hammond. It was first recorded in French, in 1967, by Les Troubadours as "La chaîne". The first English version was recorded in 1968 by a UK group called Colors of Love, which included singer Elaine Paige.

== Albert Hammond recording ==
Hammond's own version, released in 1974, was the first one to chart. The song reached #15 on the Adult Contemporary chart and #31 on the Billboard Hot 100 in 1974. It also made number 2 in the then West Germany, where it stayed in the Top 20 for 14 weeks. It also reached the Top 3 in Switzerland, the Top 10 in the Netherlands, Norway and the Flemish part of Belgium, and reached number 22 in the French-speaking part of Belgium. The song appeared on Hammond's 1974 album, Albert Hammond. The song was produced by him and Roy Halee and also was featured, along with filmed footage of trains traveling, on Captain Kangaroo.

== Charts ==
Chart (1974)	Peak position
Australia (Kent Music Report)	85
New Zealand (Listener)	7
US Billboard Easy Listening	15
US Billboard Hot 100	31
