= The Free Electric Band =

1973 Albert Hammond song

Single by Albert Hammond

from the album The Free Electric Band
- B-side: "You Taught Me to Sing the Blues"
- Released: April 1973
- Genre: Pop rock, soft rock
- Length: 3:15
- Label: Mums Records 6009
- Songwriters: Albert Hammond, Mike Hazlewood
- Producer: Albert Hammond

Albert Hammond singles chronology
"If You've Got to Break Another Heart" (1973)	"The Free Electric Band" (1973)	"The Peacemaker" (1973)

"The Free Electric Band" is a song written by Albert Hammond and Mike Hazlewood and performed by Hammond. It was produced by Hammond and arranged by Michael Omartian and is from Hammond's 1973 album of the same name.

The song reached No. 48 on the U.S. Billboard Hot 100, No. 19 on the UK Singles Chart, No. 11 in South Africa, No. 4 in Germany, No. 3 in the Netherlands and was most successful in Norway, where it reached No. 1.

== Charts ==
Charts (1973)	Peak position
Australia (Kent Music Report)	38
Canada RPM Adult Contemporary	28
Canada RPM Top Singles	44
Netherlands (Single Top 100)	3
Norway (VG-lista)	1
South Africa (Springbok)	11
Sweden (Tio i topp)	1
UK Singles (OCC)	19
U.S. Billboard Hot 100	48
U.S. Cash Box Top 100	41
West Germany (GfK)	4

== Other recordings ==
Lalla Hansson recorded the song in Swedish, as "Han gav upp alltihop (för att spela med sitt band)" ("He gave it all up (to play with his band)").
