= It Never Rains in Southern California =

Single by Albert Hammond

from the album It Never Rains in Southern California
- B-side: "Anyone Here in the Audience"
- Released: September 22, 1972
- Recorded: 1972
- Genre: Soft rock, country pop
- Length: 3:19 (single version); 3:50 (album version)
- Label: Mums
- Songwriters: Albert Hammond, Mike Hazlewood
- Producers: Albert Hammond, Don Altfeld

Albert Hammond singles chronology
"Down by the River" (1972)	"It Never Rains in Southern California" (1972)	"If You Gotta Break Another Heart" (1973)

"It Never Rains in Southern California" is a 1972 song jointly written and composed by Albert Hammond and Mike Hazlewood and sung by Hammond, a British-born singer-songwriter.

== Lyrical content ==
The lyrics of "It Never Rains In Southern California" tell a first-person story of a showbiz aspirant whose attempts to break into entertainment were failures, but who wants to hide that fact from those he had left behind to pursue his dreams.

Though Hammond's and Hazlewood's lyrics do not actually specify the narrator's living conditions, it can be inferred that he was found homeless and penniless, a humiliation he would naturally be unwilling to reveal to those he had left behind.

== Recording ==
Hammond collaborated with Don Altfeld to produce the selection when he recorded it.

Instrumental backing was provided by L.A. session musicians from the Wrecking Crew, but with Michael Omartian on piano. The song appears on Hammond's debut album of the same name and peaked at number five on the US Billboard Hot 100 chart. It was Hammond's only top 10 hit to date (although he would have one other top 40 hit in 1974 with "I'm a Train").

In 1984, Julio Iglesias re-worked the song as "Moonlight Lady" for his concept album 1100 Bel Air Place, with the original song on which it is based used as an uncredited reprise at the end of the track.

In 1989, Hammond re-recorded the song for his Best of Me greatest hits compilation.

== In popular culture ==
- The song was featured in Season 2, Episode 7 of the American comedy series Hacks

== Chart performance ==
=== Weekly charts ===
==== Albert Hammond version ====
Chart (1972–1973)	Peak position
Australia (Kent Music Report)	12
Canada RPM Top Singles	2
Canada RPM Adult Contemporary	38
Dutch Singles Chart	21
Japanese Oricon Singles Chart	11
Japanese Oricon International Chart	1
Norwegian VG-lista Singles Chart	3
New Zealand (Listener)	2
Spanish Singles Chart	1
Swiss Singles Chart	5
US Billboard Hot 100	5
US Billboard Easy Listening	2
US Cash Box Top 100	2
West German Singles Chart	9

=== Year-end charts ===
Chart (1973)	Rank
Australia	77
US Billboard Hot 100	98
US Cash Box	36

==== Saori Minami version ====
Chart (1973)	Peak position
Japanese Oricon Singles Chart	77

==== Trent Summar and the New Row Mob version ====
Chart (2000)	Peak position
U.S. Billboard Hot Country Songs	74
