= The Family Dogg =

British vocal group

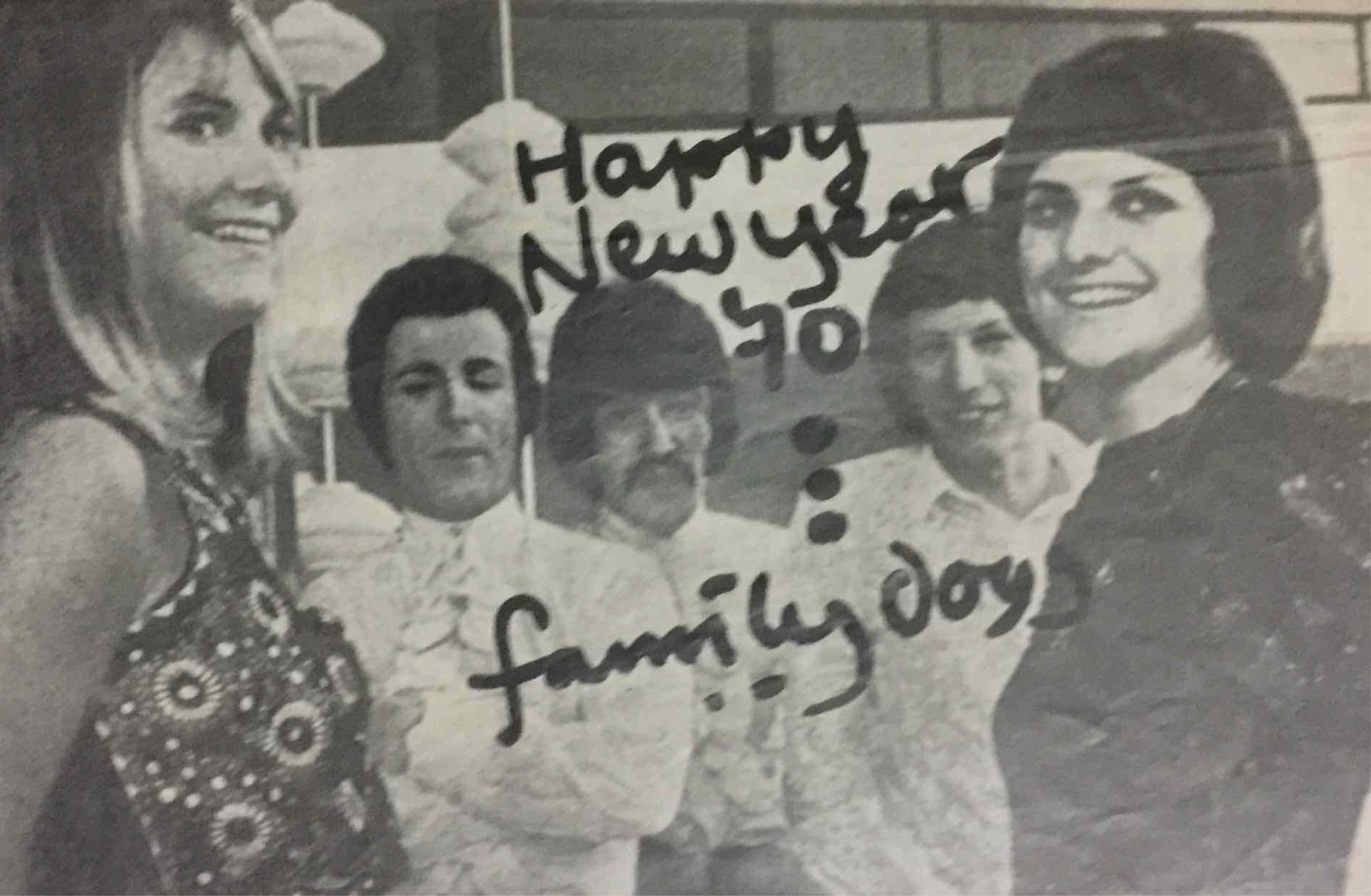

Background information
- Origin: England
- Genres: Rock, pop
- Years active: 1966–1976
- Past members: Albert Hammond; Steve Rowland; Mike Hazlewood; Christine Holmes; Doreen De Veuve; Pam "Zooey" Quinn; Kevin Lamb; Ireen Sheer; Sue Lynn; Sherri Lynn; Pat Arnold

The Family Dogg were a British vocal group, noted for their harmony vocals. They are best known for their debut album, A Way of Life, and the subsequent single of the same name.

== Career ==
The idea was born when the Anglo-American singers of the Spanish groups, Los Flaps and Diamond Boys, Albert Hammond and Steve Rowland met for the first time at a concert in Madrid in 1964. In 1966, the Family Dogg was formed in England with the participation of the singers Mike Hazlewood and Pam Zooey Quinn. The debut album, A Way of Life was released in 1969, and the title track scored a number 6 hit in the UK Singles Chart. Jimmy Page, John Bonham and John Paul Jones of Led Zeppelin were guest musicians on this album, along with Elton John.

In 1970, the group was renamed 'Steve Rowland and the Family Dogg'. During April–June 1970, they had a number 1 hit in the Netherlands with the song "Sympathy", previously recorded by the group Rare Bird in 1969. In 1972, Steve Rowland released a last Family Dogg album, The View from Rowland's Head, with guest musicians Chris Spedding on guitar and Ireen Sheer as singer. This album had two pressings, one in the UK and one in the US. Between the two, were included six cover songs that were written by Sixto Diaz Rodriguez. Five of them were previously recorded on Rodriguez's album, Cold Fact. The sixth, "Advice To Smokey Robinson", was never recorded by Rodriguez.

The Family Dogg also released the singles "Family Dog" / "The Storm" in 1967 (the latter is a song originally written by the Bee Gees in Australia) on the MGM label, and "Silly Grin" / "Couldn't Help It", and "Brown Eyed Girl" / "Let It Rain" in 1968; on the Fontana label.

Their final release in 1976 was a cover version of "Uptown Uptempo Woman".

Christine Holmes (AKA Christine Authors, her husband J. J. Barrie's real surname) had earlier recorded seven solo singles between 1964 and 1971 which were released on the Mercury and Polydor labels, and had appeared as a presenter on the BBC children's show Crackerjack in 1966–69. On 31 December 1974, she appeared on UK television singing on the Wheeltappers and Shunters Social Club, introduced by Bernard Manning. Her stage name at that time was Kristine Sparkle, under which she recorded five singles and an album (Image) for the Decca label. She went on to co-write and record "Devil Woman" with Terry Britten, which became a 1976 top 10 hit for Cliff Richard, and released a further seven singles and an album (I'm a Song), under the name Kristine, on the United Artists and husband J. J. Barrie's Power Exchange labels.

== Group members ==
=== Original line-up ===
- Steve Rowland – vocals, guitar, drums
- Albert Hammond – vocals, guitar
- Mike Hazlewood – vocals, guitar
- Pam "Zooey" Quinn – vocals (1966 – August 1969)
- Jane Harries – vocals (1966 – October 1967)

=== Later members ===
- Sue Avory – vocals (November 1967 – 1968)
- Doreen De Veuve – vocals (1968 – June 1969)
- Christine Holmes – vocals (June 1969 – 1970)
- Ireen Sheer – vocals (September 1969 – 1971)
- Sue Lynn – vocals (1971–1972)
- Sherri Lynn [Brenda Pidduck] – vocals (1970)
- Pat Arnold – vocals (session work)

== Discography ==
=== Albums ===
- 1969: A Way of Life
- 1972: The View from Rowland's Head
- 1983: Greatest Hits
- 1990: A View From Rowland's Head
- 2000: Sympathy
- 2014: A Way of Life Anthology 1967–1976

=== Singles ===
| Year | Single | Peak chart positions | | | | | |
| Year | Single | BE (FLA) | BE (WA) | GER | IRE | NL | UK |
|---|---|---|---|---|---|---|---|
| 1967 | "The Storm" | — | — | — | — | — | — |
| 1968 | "Silly Grin" | — | — | — | — | — | — |
| 1968 | "Brown Eyed Girl" | — | — | — | — | — | — |
| 1969 | "A Way of Life" | — | — | 38 | 6 | 8 | 6 |
| 1969 | "Arizona" | — | — | — | — | Tip | — |
| 1970 | "Sympathy" (as Steve Rowland and the Family Dogg) | 10 | 4 | — | — | 1 | — |
| 1970 | "When Tomorrow Comes Tomorrow" | — | — | — | — | — | — |
| 1970 | "Love Minus Zero/No Limit" (Netherlands-only release) | — | — | — | — | — | — |
| 1971 | "Coat of Many Colours" | — | — | — | — | — | — |
| 1972 | "Sweet America" | — | — | — | — | — | — |
| 1972 | "Rikers Island" (as Steve Rowland and the Family Dogg; US-only release) | — | — | — | — | — | — |
| 1976 | "Uptown, Uptempo Woman" | — | — | — | — | — | — |
"—" denotes releases that did not chart or were not released
