= Albert Hammond =

British-Gibraltarian musician, producer (born 1944)

Albert Hammond OBE
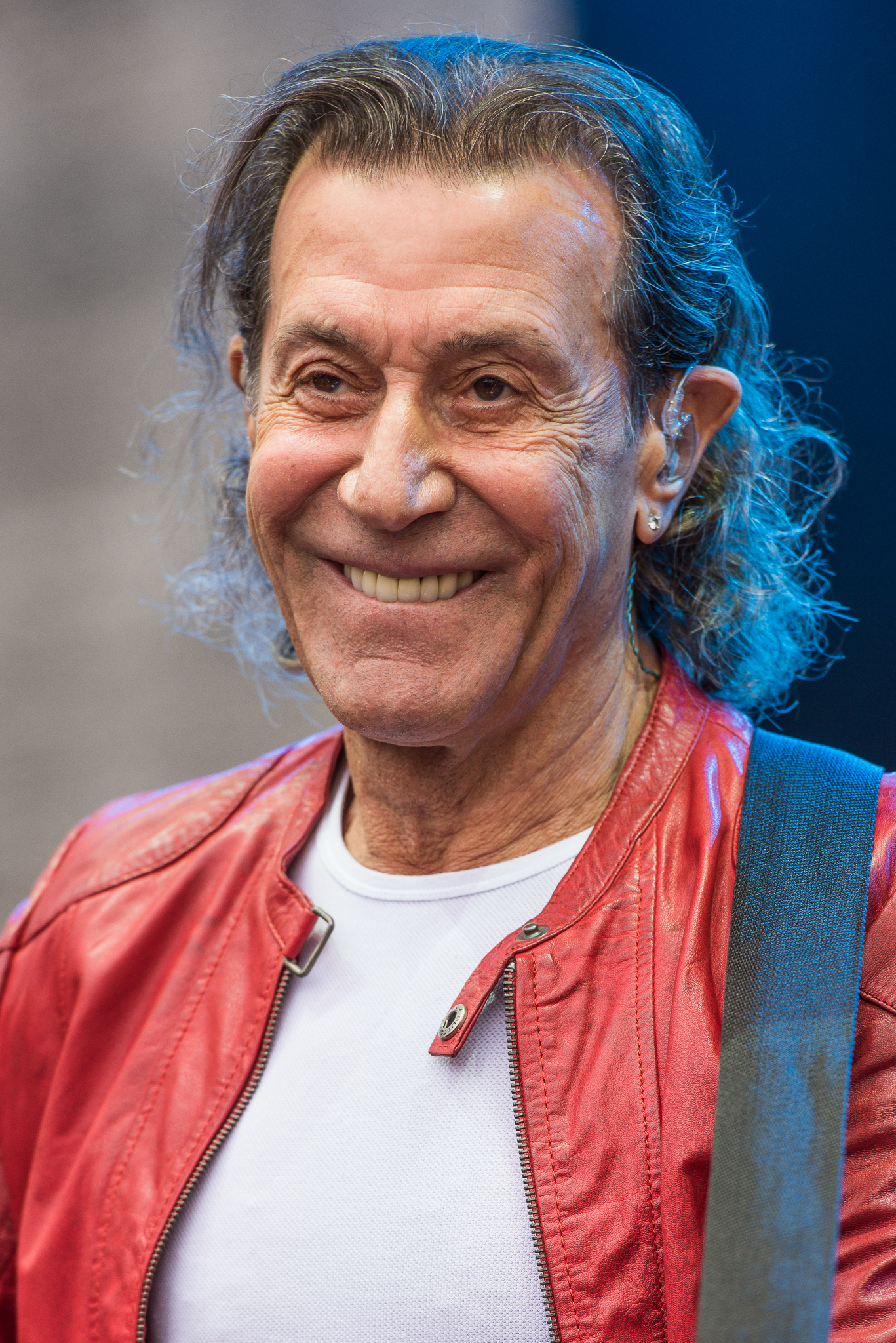
- Albert Hammond (2015)

Background information
- Also known as: Albert Hammond Sr.
- Born: Albert Louis Hammond; 18 May 1944 (age 82); London, England
- Origin: Gibraltar
- Genres: Pop rock, soft rock
- Occupations: Singer-songwriter; musician; record producer
- Instruments: Guitar; piano; vocals
- Years active: 1960–present
- Formerly of: The Diamond Boys; The Family Dogg
- Website: alberthammond.com

Albert Louis Hammond OBE (born 18 May 1944) is a Gibraltarian singer, songwriter and record producer. As a songwriter he has collaborated with songwriters Mike Hazlewood, John Bettis, Hal David, Diane Warren, Holly Knight, Carole Bayer Sager and Roy Orbison.

Hammond wrote commercially successful singles for singers Celine Dion, Joe Dolan, Aretha Franklin, Whitney Houston, Diana Ross, Leo Sayer, Tina Turner, Glen Campbell, Julio Iglesias, Willie Nelson, Lynn Anderson and Bonnie Tyler, and bands Ace of Base, Air Supply, Blue Mink, Chicago, Heart, Living in a Box, the Carpenters, the Hollies, the Pipkins, Starship, and Westlife.

Songs co-written by Hammond include "Make Me an Island" and "You're Such a Good Looking Woman" by Joe Dolan, "Nothing's Gonna Stop Us Now" by Starship, "One Moment in Time" sung by Whitney Houston, "The Air That I Breathe", a hit for the Hollies, "To All the Girls I've Loved Before", a Julio Iglesias/Willie Nelson duet, and "When I Need You" by Leo Sayer. In 2015, he received the British Academy's Ivor Novello Award for Outstanding Song Collection.

Hammond is also a solo singer in his own right. His biggest (and only top 20) US Billboard hit was "It Never Rains in Southern California", #5 in 1972. Other songs of his include "Down by the River", "The Free Electric Band", "I'm a Train", and "When I'm Gone". For a time, he was part of the Family Dogg, a vocal band with whom he had the hit "A Way of Life". He has also produced for a number of other artists.

== Early life and success ==
Hammond was born in London, after his family had been evacuated from Gibraltar during World War II. Shortly after the war, the family returned to Gibraltar where Hammond grew up. In 1960, he started in music with Gibraltarian band the Diamond Boys, which had no real commercial success but played a part in Spain's introduction to pop and rock music. The Diamond Boys performed at the first nightclubs in Madrid to stage modern bands, alongside Spanish rock and roll pioneers such as Miguel Ríos.

In 1966, Hammond co-founded the British vocal band the Family Dogg, reaching number 6 on the UK Singles Chart with "A Way of Life" in 1969, taken from the album of the same name.

== Career ==
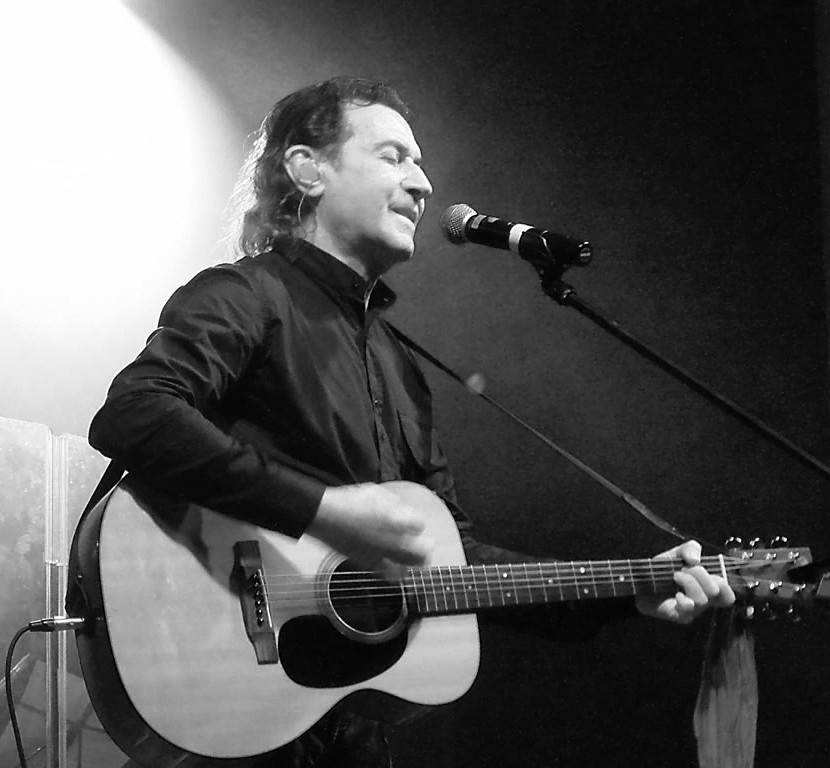
Hammond performing in Germany in 2013

Hammond moved to the United States at age 26 in 1970, continuing his professional music career. However, he had his greatest commercial success in mainland Europe. His successful 1970s singles, released on Columbia subsidiary Mums Records include "Down by the River", "It Never Rains in Southern California", "The Free Electric Band" (his only single to chart in the UK), "Half a Million Miles from Home", "If You Gotta Break Another Heart", "The Peacemaker", "I Don't Wanna Die in an Air Disaster", "I'm a Train" and "99 Miles from L.A."

In 1970, Hammond joined forces with Steve Rowland. Billed as "Steve & Albert", the duo released a single, "Follow the Bouncing Ball" which they heavily promoted, particularly in the UK. They appeared on Top of the Pops and The Basil Brush Show in the UK, but the single failed to chart.

Hammond also wrote songs for others with frequent collaborator Mike Hazlewood. These include "Little Arrows" for Leapy Lee, "Make Me an Island" (1969) (which Hammond himself recorded in a Spanish disco-style in 1979), and "You're Such a Good Looking Woman" (1970) for Joe Dolan, "Gimme Dat Ding" for the Pipkins in 1970 (itself a cover from the Freddie and the Dreamers album Oliver in the Overworld), "Good Morning Freedom" for Blue Mink, "Freedom Come, Freedom Go" for the Fortunes in 1971 and "The Air That I Breathe" which was a hit for the Hollies in 1974. In 1971, Hammond also sang on Michael Chapman's fourth album Wrecked Again, and worked briefly with the Magic Lanterns on recordings of his and Hazlewood's songs, and other material.

Written with Carole Bayer Sager, "When I Need You" was first recorded by Hammond on his 1976 album When I Need You. Produced by Richard Perry, Leo Sayer's version made #1 on the UK Singles Chart for two weeks in February 1977. Commercially successful worldwide, it reached #1 in Canada (RPM Top Singles, also for two weeks), and on the Billboard Hot 100 for a week in May 1977. Leapy Lee released a version of "When I Need You" on his first recording since 1970.

In 1991, Hammond co-wrote "When You Tell Me That You Love Me" recorded by Diana Ross, which reached #2 on the UK Singles Chart. In 2005, Ross re-recorded the song, this time as a duet with Westlife. Again, the song reached #2 in the UK.

In 2005, he released Revolution of the Heart (where Todd Sharpville was his music director), and the single "This Side of Midnight".

In 2008, Hammond met Kasaan Steigen of the Los Angeles-based Trigger Management who became his personal manager, during which time Hammond collaborated with British singer Duffy. Duffy's resulting album, Endlessly, co-written and co-produced by Hammond, was released in November 2010.

In 2010, Hammond also worked on Legend, a new recording of duets of his most successful singles, featuring artists including Elena Paparizou and Bonnie Tyler. It was released on Sony Spain on 23 November that year.

== Personal life ==
In 1979, Hammond married Argentinian former model Claudia Fernández. His son with Fernández, Albert Hammond, Jr. is a member of rock band The Strokes.

== Awards and recognition ==
In 1987, Hammond's composition with Diane Warren "Nothing's Gonna Stop Us Now" (recorded by Starship) was nominated for an Oscar, Golden Globe and Grammy Award. In 1988, Hammond won an Emmy Award for the song "One Moment in Time", a song he wrote along with John Bettis for NBC Sports' coverage of the 1988 Summer Olympics.

In 2000, he received the Order of the British Empire (OBE).

On 19 June 2008, Hammond was inducted in the Songwriters Hall of Fame.

In May 2015, Hammond collected the Ivor Novello award for outstanding song collection.

In 2023, he received the Ministry of Culture Lifetime Achievement Award.

== Songwriting credits ==
(in alphabetical order of song title)

Title	Writing collaboration with	Artist / band	Year released
"99 Miles from L.A."	Hal David	Albert Hammond; Art Garfunkel; Johnny Mathis; Julio Iglesias; Nancy Sinatra; Dionne Warwick; Stevie Holland	1975; 1975; 1975; 1990; 2002; 2012; 2015
"Be Tender with Me Baby"	Holly Knight	Tina Turner	1990
"Blow the House Down"	Marcus Vere	Living in a Box	1989
"Don't Turn Around"	Diane Warren	Tina Turner; Bonnie Tyler; Aswad; Ace of Base	1986; 1988; 1988; 1993
"Easy to Love"	Leo Sayer	Leo Sayer	1977
"Gimme Dat Ding"	Mike Hazlewood	The Pipkins	1970
"Give a Little Love"	Diane Warren	Hammond and West; Aswad	1986; 1988
"Good Morning Freedom"	Roger Cook, Roger Greenaway and Mike Hazlewood	Blue Mink	1970
"I Don't Wanna Live Without Your Love"	Diane Warren	Chicago	1988
"I Don't Wanna Lose You"	Graham Lyle	Tina Turner	1989
"I'm Not Crying over You"	Chris De Burgh	Chris De Burgh	1995
"I Need to Be in Love"	Richard Carpenter and John Bettis	The Carpenters	1976
"It Isn't, It Wasn't, It Ain't Never Gonna Be"	Diane Warren	Aretha Franklin and Whitney Houston	1989
"Just Walk Away"	Marti Sharron	Celine Dion	1995
"Little Arrows"	Mike Hazlewood	Leapy Lee	1968
"Lonely Is the Night"	Diane Warren	Air Supply	1986
"Love Thing"	Holly Knight	Tina Turner	1991
"Love's Got a Hold on Me"	Chris De Burgh	Chris De Burgh	1994
"Make Me an Island"	Mike Hazlewood	Joe Dolan; Tom Northcott	1969
"Nothing's Gonna Stop Us Now"	Diane Warren	Starship	1986
"Once in a Lifetime"	Antonina Armato, Dennis Morgan	Kansas	1988
"One Moment in Time"	John Bettis	Whitney Houston	1988
"Rebecca"	Mike Hazlewood	Flo & Eddie	1975
"Room in Your Heart"	Marcus Vere and Richard Darbyshire	Living in a Box	1989
"Tall, Dark Handsome Stranger"	Holly Knight	Heart	1990
"The Air That I Breathe"	Mike Hazlewood	Albert Hammond; Phil Everly; The Hollies; Simply Red	1972; 1973; 1974; 1998
"The Snows of New York"	Chris De Burgh	Chris De Burgh	1994
"To All the Girls I've Loved Before"	Hal David	Julio Iglesias and Willie Nelson	1984
"Way of the World"	Graham Lyle	Tina Turner	1991
"When I Need You"	Carole Bayer Sager	Albert Hammond; Leo Sayer; Rod Stewart; Celine Dion; Will Mellor Austin Peters	1976; 1976; 1996; 1997; 1998 2019
"When You Tell Me That You Love Me"	John Bettis	Diana Ross / Diana Ross and Westlife	1991; 2005
"Where Were You"	Holly Knight	Bonnie Tyler	1992
"You're Such a Good Looking Woman"	Mike Hazlewood	Joe Dolan	1970

=== Other languages ===
(in alphabetical order of song title)

Title	Language	Writing collaboration with	Artist / band	Year released
"Cantaré, cantarás"	Spanish	Juan Carlos Calderón and Anahí van Zandweghe	Hermanos (Various Latin artists)	1985
"Entre mis recuerdos"	Spanish	Holly Knight and Luz Casal	Luz Casal	1995
"Sensualité"	French	Shelly Peiken and Axelle Red	Axelle Red	1993
"Y Tú También Llorarás"	Spanish	Anahi van Zandweghe	José Luis Rodríguez	1987

=== Other songwriting credits ===
(in alphabetical order of song title)

- "Careless Heart" – written with Roy Orbison and Diane Warren
- "Creep" (by Radiohead) – subsequently given co-writing credits (with Mike Hazlewood), due to the song's musical similarity to "The Air That I Breathe"
- He co-wrote almost all songs on Welsh singer Duffy's album Endlessly, including Duffy songs "My Boy", "Lovestruck" and "Well, Well, Well"
- "Have Mercy" – written with Shelly Peiken for Yazz; was also recorded by Viktor Lazlo on her album Back To Front
- "I Give It All To You" / "I Imagine" – written with Steve Duberry and Lord 'n Elliot and sung by Mary Kiani in 1995
- "Loving You (Is a Way of Life)" – co-written with Tom Snow and Franne Golde and recorded by Australian singer Jon Stevens
- "Moonlight Lady" – written by Hammond and Carole Bayer Sager and originally sung by Hammond with a large adaptation from "It Never Rains in Southern California". It was later recorded by Julio Iglesias in his 1984 album 1100 Bel Air Place
- "Oklahoma Sunday Morning" – co-written with Tony Macaulay and Mike Hazlewood, a hit for Glen Campbell
- "Once in a Lifetime" – written with Antonina Armato and Dennis Morgan
- "Smokey Factory Blues" – written by Hammond and Hazlewood, and recorded by Johnny Cash on his John R. Cash album; was also recorded by Steppenwolf on the Slow Flux album
- "Through the Storm" – a duet with Aretha Franklin and Elton John
- "Mary was an Only Child" - co-written with Mike Hazlewood sung by Art Garfunkel on his 1973 debut album Angel Clare

== See also ==
- Music of Gibraltar
