= Mike Hazlewood =

English singer, composer and songwriter (1941–2001)

- Died: 6 May 2001 (aged 59) Florence, Italy
- Genres: Pop; soft rock
- Occupations: Singer, songwriter, composer
- Instruments: Vocals, guitar
- Years active: 1966–2001
- Formerly of: The Family Dogg, Hammond & Hazlewood

Mike Hazlewood (24 December 1941 – 6 May 2001) was a British singer-songwriter and composer. He variously worked with Albert Hammond, T-Bone Burnett, Van Dyke Parks and Harry Nilsson.

== Biography ==
Educated at Hazelwick School, in Crawley, West Sussex, Hazlewood began his career as a DJ at the radio station Radio Luxembourg in the early 1960s. In 1966, he founded the group the Family Dogg with Albert Hammond and Steve Rowland. In addition, he often wrote songs in collaboration with Hammond such as "Green Green Trees", "Little Arrows" for Leapy Lee, and "Gimme Dat Ding" for the Pipkins. Hammond and Hazlewood wrote "The Air That I Breathe" which was originally released by Hammond in 1972, and then on Phil Everly's 1973 solo album Star Spangled Springer. The song was subsequently a huge hit for the Hollies.

Hazlewood's collaboration with Hammond resulted in co-written songs for the latter such as "It Never Rains in Southern California" and "The Free Electric Band". Hazlewood also recorded a single with Hammond under the moniker 'Hammond-Hazlewood' called 'Hey Love let me in'.

Hazlewood and Hammond also wrote the international hit song "Make Me an Island" for the Irish singer Joe Dolan in 1969, as well as his follow-up singles, "Teresa" and "You're Such a Good Looking Woman". The latter became a signature hit for Dolan, topping the Irish charts twice, in 1970 and 1997 when he re-recorded it with Dustin the Turkey. Hazlewood also wrote the song "Southern Lady", which was recorded by Rita Coolidge.

During the late 1980s, Hazlewood held the theatrical rights to Mervyn Peake's novel Mr. Pye, and completed a musical theatre version of the book in collaboration with Howard Lee Sloan, the American-born pianist and composer.

Hazlewood and Hammond are also credited as co-writers of the 1992 Radiohead song, "Creep". Due to similarities to "The Air That I Breathe", Radiohead was successfully sued for plagiarism. "Creep" used a chord progression taken from "The Air That I Breathe" in its verse and a melody in the bridge following the second chorus.

On 6 May 2001, Hazlewood died aged 59 from a heart attack, during his holiday in Florence, Italy.
