= Carter & Lewis =

English songwriters

John Carter & Ken Lewis are English songwriters, who wrote many hits in the 1960s for various pop bands. They were published by Southern Music, and operated out of their recording studios in London's Denmark Street.

== Personnel details ==
- John Carter (born John Nicholas Shakespeare, 20 October 1942, Small Heath, Birmingham)
- Ken Lewis (born Kenneth James Hawker, 3 December 1942, Small Heath, Birmingham; died 2 August 2015 from complications associated with diabetes, Cherry Hinton, Cambridge)

== See also ==
- Carter-Lewis and the Southerners
- The Ivy League
- The Flower Pot Men
- Herman's Hermits
- Brenda Lee
- The Music Explosion
- The First Class
- Mary Hopkin
- Peter and Gordon
- Paul Brett
