= The Pipkins =

British musical duo

- Origin: London, England, U.K.
- Genre: Pop
- Years active: 1970
- Past members: Roger Greenaway; Tony Burrows

The Pipkins were a short-lived English novelty duo, best known for their hit single "Gimme Dat Ding" (written by Albert Hammond and Mike Hazlewood), which reached No. 6 on the UK Singles Charts, No. 7 in Canada (RPM Top Singles), and No. 9 on the US Billboard Hot 100 chart in 1970.

== History ==
The duo consisted of Roger Greenaway, best known as a member of several songwriting teams, and Tony Burrows, a singer who had performed in various groups (often simultaneously), including Edison Lighthouse, the Flower Pot Men, White Plains, the First Class and Brotherhood of Man.

The Pipkins also released two follow-ups as singles, "Yakety Yak" and "Are You Cooking, Goose?", but without success. "My Baby Loves Lovin'" had been a hit for White Plains, whilst "Sunny Honey Girl" was a top 20 hit for Cliff Richard in 1971 on the UK Singles Chart.

In the US, the Pipkins released their own album in 1970. Called Gimme Dat Ding, it was on Capitol ST-483 and peaked at No. 132 on the Billboard 200. It was a concept album in that the first song on it introduced the Pipkins, and the last song on it has them falling through the "little hole" on the album.

== Discography ==
=== Albums ===
Year	Title	Peak chart positions		Notes
Year	Title	US	CAN	Notes
1970	Gimme Dat Ding	132	27	A split album Side 1: The Sweet; Side 2: The Pipkins except in North America, all songs by The Pipkins

=== Songs ===
- "Gimme Dat Ding" – US #9, UK #6, CAN #7, AUS #61)
- "Yakety Yak"
- "Are You Cooking, Goose?"
- "My Baby Loves Lovin'"
- "Sunny Honey Girl"
- "Hole in the Middle"

In addition, the Pipkins recorded two non album songs, "To Love You" and "Sugar and Spice", both of which were B-sides to singles.

In all, the Pipkins recorded a total of 12 songs.
