= The World of the Brotherhood of Man =

Compilation album by Brotherhood of Man
- Released: June 1973
- Genre: Pop, MOR, soul
- Length: 34:21
- Label: Decca
- Producer: Tony Hiller

Brotherhood of Man chronology
We're the Brotherhood of Man (1972)	The World of the Brotherhood of Man (1973)	Good Things Happening (1974)

The World of the Brotherhood of Man is the third album released by British pop group Brotherhood of Man. Featuring a mix of new and previously released material, the album contained the group's two biggest hits "United We Stand" and "Where Are You Going To My Love". This was the final release of the early incarnation of the group.

== Background ==
The album was released on Decca Records (the owner of Deram Records - the group's regular label) in June 1973. The album was a compilation which was released after the original version of the group had disbanded. The album featured six singles by the group, including their most recent, "Say a Prayer", which had been released some months earlier. Also included on the album were four previously unreleased songs as well as some non-album A-sides and B-sides. A re-release of earlier single, "United We Stand" was pulled from this album in late 1973. One of the singles included on the album "California Sunday Morning" received a favourable review in Billboard Magazine, which called it a "ballad beauty" and predicted an entry into the top 60.

By the time this album was issued, a new line-up of the group was already in place. This version of the group recorded the track "Maybe the Morning" as one of their first releases and went on to record their own versions of "United We Stand" and "Where Are You Going to My Love". In 1976 they performed the song "Follow Me" at the Miss UK televised final.

== Track listing ==
Side One

No.	Title	Writer(s)	Original album	Length
1.	"Reach Out Your Hand"	Tony Hiller	We're the Brotherhood of Man (1972)	3:17
2.	"Say a Prayer"	Hiller; Peter Simons	United We Stand (1970)	3:11
3.	"Follow Me"	Hiller; Colin Frechter	We're the Brotherhood of Man	2:16
4.	"California Sunday Morning"	Hiller	Non-album A-side (1971)	3:21
5.	"You Are What You Are"	Hiller; Paul Curtis	Previously unreleased	2:31
6.	"Where Are You Going to My Love"	Hiller; John Goodison; Billy Day; Mike Lesley	United We Stand	3:19
Total length:				17:55

Side Two

No.	Title	Writer(s)	Original album	Length
1.	"Love Me Like I Love You"	Tony Hiller	Previously unreleased	3:00
2.	"Following a One Man Band"	Hiller	Previously unreleased	2:42
3.	"This Boy"	Hiller; Goodison	Non-album A-side (1970)	2:51
4.	"Do Your Thing"	Hiller; Goodison	Non-album B-side (1971)	2:31
5.	"Maybe the Morning"	Gordon Gray; Richard Anthony Hewson	Previously unreleased	2:38
6.	"United We Stand"	Hiller; Simons	United We Stand	2:52
Total length:				16:26
