= Carter-Lewis and the Southerners =

English rock band

Carter-Lewis and the Southerners were an early-1960s rock band, formed by the Birmingham-born musicians Ken Lewis (guitarist, singer, songwriter) and John Carter (producer, singer, songwriter).

== History ==
Carter and Lewis were initially songwriters. The early 1960s saw the rise of the Liverpool Sound, and Carter and Lewis recorded copies of the latest group hits and performed them for the BBC Light Programme's shows Easy Beat and Saturday Club; working with jazz musicians such as Marion Montgomery, Marion Ryan and session musicians such as Kenny Clare (drums) and Roy Deltrice (bass), under the direction of their music publisher Freddy Webb of Southern Music. They wrote Mike Sarne's 1962 chart-topping single "Will I What?". Eventually their manager Terry Kennedy convinced them that they needed to form a band to showcase their songs. Jimmy Page (who replaced Canadian Lorne Greene on guitar), Viv Prince (later of the Pretty Things fame) and Perry Ford from Lincoln were members of the band, although Page was only there briefly. However, few of their singles featured Carter-Lewis compositions.

Carter and Lewis also composed songs for a number of other artists, including Brenda Lee and P.J. Proby. John Carter sang the lead on The New Vaudeville Band's 1966 number 1 hit, "Winchester Cathedral", and the pair wrote Herman's Hermits 1965 hit "Can't You Hear My Heartbeat", which reached number 2 on the US Billboard Hot 100.

Carter, Lewis and Ford continued as The Ivy League, who had a number of chart hits, and also providing backing vocals on such hit singles as The Who's "I Can't Explain"). In 1966 they left the Ivy League to form the production company 'Sunny Music', creating The Flower Pot Men whose hit "Let's Go To San Francisco" reached number 4 in the UK Singles Chart in 1967. By this time Carter and Lewis worked purely as songwriters, arrangers, producers and studio-based musicians – if their recorded work subsequently found an audience (as with The Flower Pot Men), they would then organize a group around that name to actively promote the recordings via concerts, etc. In this fashion they were responsible for White Plains, First Class (whose hit song "Beach Baby", reached No. 4 on the Billboard Hot 100 in 1974), and others in the late 1960s and early 1970s.

== Discography ==
=== Singles ===
- 1961 – "So Much in Love / Back on the Scene", Piccadilly 7N 35004
- 1962 – "Here's Hoping / Poor Joe", Piccadilly 7N 35084
- 1962 – "Two Timing Baby / Will It Happen To Me", Ember EMBS145
- 1962 – "Tell Me / Broken Heart", Ember EMBS145
- 1963 – "Sweet and Tender Romance" / "Who Told You?" (featuring Jimmy Page), Oriole CB1835
- 1963 – "Somebody Told My Girl / Your Momma's Out of Town" (featuring Jimmy Page), Oriole CB1868
- 1964 – "Skinny Minnie" / "Easy to Cry" (featuring Jimmy Page), Oriole CB1919
- 1964 - "That's What I want" by The Marauders. Decca F.11695

=== Compilation albums ===
- The Carter-Lewis Story (Sequel 1993)
