= We're the Brotherhood of Man =

Studio album by The Brotherhood of Man
- Released: 21 April 1972
- Genres: Pop, MOR, soul
- Length: 33:30
- Label: Deram
- Producer: Tony Hiller

The Brotherhood of Man chronology
United We Stand (1970)	We're the Brotherhood of Man (1972)	The World of the Brotherhood of Man (1973)

We're the Brotherhood of Man is the second album by British pop group The Brotherhood of Man in their early incarnation on Deram Records. It was released in April 1972 and featured the US hit "Reach Out Your Hand".

== Overview ==
The album was released in April 1972, nearly two years after their first album. The back cover of the album featured a write-up by DJ Terry Wogan which stated that "[The Brotherhood of Man] are one of the rare 'white' groups that make a valid 'black' sound". We're the Brotherhood of Man featured two single releases: "Reach Out Your Hand" and "You and I". None of the group's singles around this time had charted in the UK. This album similarly failed, and the group disbanded after being dropped by their record label.

"Reach Out Your Hand" was a minor hit on the Hot 100 in the United States, peaking at number 77. It was a bigger hit regionally; in Buffalo, New York, for example, WYSL charted "Reach Out Your Hand" at no less than number 18.

Manager Tony Hiller recruited a new line-up over the next few months, which was to become the more famous, Eurovision-winning formation, although one more album (a compilation) featuring the early line-up was released after this, in 1973.

== Track listing ==
Side One

1. "We're the Brotherhood of Man" (Tony Hiller / Peter Simons) 2:26
2. "No Smoke Without Fire" (Hiller / Paul Curtis) 2:39
3. "Put Your Hand in the Hand" (Gene MacLellan) 2:51
4. "Something Wonderful" (Hiller / Colin Frechter / Tony Burrows) 2:03
5. "Love's Lines, Angles and Rhymes" (Dorothea Joyce) 3:20
6. "You and I" (Hiller) 2:53

Side Two

1. "Proud Mary" (John Fogerty) 3:03
2. "The World Gets Better With Love" (Roger Cook / Roger Greenaway) 2:30
3. "There's a Mountain" (Russell Stone / Sunny Leslie) 2:47
4. "Follow Me" (Hiller / Frechter) 2:16
5. "Can't Stop Loving You" (Tony Waddington / Wayne Bickerton) 3:25
6. "Reach Out Your Hand" (Hiller) 3:17

== Personnel ==
The Brotherhood of Man:

- Johnny Goodison – Vocals
- Russell Stone – Vocals
- Sue Glover – Vocals
- Sunny Leslie – Vocals
- Tony Hiller – Producer
- Peter Rynston – Engineer
- Colin Frechter – Musical director (tracks 3,5,7,9)
- Cy Payne – Musical director (tracks 1,8)
- Keith Mansfield – Musical director (tracks 2,4,6,10,11,12)
- Peter Collins – Technician (studio assistant)
- Terry Wogan – Sleeve notes
- LWT – Cover photography
