= John Carter (English musician) =

English singer (born 1942)

- Born: John Nicholas Shakespeare; 20 October 1942 (age 83)
- Origin: Small Heath, Birmingham, England
- Genres: Pop
- Occupations: Singer, songwriter, record producer
- Instruments: Vocals, piano
- Years active: 1960s–present

John Nicholas Shakespeare (born 20 October 1942), known as John Carter, is an English singer, songwriter, and record producer.

== Overview ==
Mainly popular in the 1960s and early 1970s, Carter's craftsmanship can be heard at work with:

- Carter-Lewis and the Southerners.
- The Ivy League – "Funny How Love Can Be", "That's Why I'm Crying", "Tossing and Turning"
- Herman's Hermits – "Can't You Hear My Heartbeat"
- Brenda Lee – "Is It True?"
- The Music Explosion – "Little Bit O' Soul"
- Peter and Gordon – "Sunday for Tea"
- The Flower Pot Men – "Let's Go to San Francisco"
- The First Class – "Beach Baby"
- Sacha Distel – "Vite, Cherie, Vite" (French version of "Beach Baby")
- Mary Hopkin – "Knock, Knock Who's There?"
- Kincade – "Dreams Are Ten A Penny"

== Biography ==
Carter met his future songwriting partner Ken Hawker at school in Birmingham. They formed a skiffle band in the 1950s called LVI. It was then they began writing songs together: "We began to write real Buddy Holly take-offs. Which was good, it got us excited about songwriting." In 1960, the duo went to London and presented themselves under their songwriting pseudonyms John Carter and Ken Lewis. Terry Kennedy became their manager and convinced them to start their own band as an outlet for their songs. In 1961, the first single by Carter-Lewis and the Southerners, "Back on the Scene", was released. But the band never broke through and their main claim to fame remains a brief stint that Jimmy Page did as their lead guitarist. In 1964, they met Perry Ford, who worked as an engineer in a small recording studio in Denmark Street, London. They noticed their voices blended well and started recording demos together, resulting in a single on Pye Records, "What More Do You Want" as the Ivy League. Their luck changed when Herman's Hermits recorded "Can't You Hear My Heartbeat" and took it to number 2 on the Billboard Hot 100 in the United States. In the UK it was a smaller hit for Goldie and the Gingerbreads.

They then provided backing vocals for "I Can't Explain", by the Who. In 1965 and 1966, The Ivy League scored four UK chart hits, including "Tossing and Turning", which reached number 3 in the UK Singles Chart and "Funny How Love Can Be" being their other top 10 hit. By early 1966, Carter decided he had had enough of touring and was replaced by Tony Burrows from The Kestrels. That year, he married Gill Shakespeare who would later write lyrics for some of his songs. Carter concentrated on songwriting, providing hits for Peter and Gordon and Brenda Lee. He found a new songwriting partner in Geoff Stephens, resulting in "My World Fell Down", recorded by The Ivy League, later to be covered by Gary Usher's Sagittarius and Dutch band The Buffoons.

Carter sang lead on the New Vaudeville Band's hit single "Winchester Cathedral", a traditional pop pastiche that became a U.S. chart-topper. He also released a single "White Collar Worker", recorded with Mickey Keen and Robin Shaw, as The Ministry of Sound. Early in 1967, Ken Lewis quit the Ivy League and started writing and recording again with Carter. One of the first results was "Let's Go to San Francisco", released as the Flower Pot Men. As was the case with "Winchester Cathedral", when the recording, made by session musicians, became a hit, a band had to be assembled for live appearances.

In late 1967, Carter and Lewis formed Sunny Records as their production company. Starting early 1968, Carter's output became more and more confusing. Songs intended for the Flowerpot Men were released as Friends, Haystack and Dawn Chorus, only to be re-released in this century as the Flowerpot Men. The 'touring' Flower Pot Men were forced by Deram Records to record songs by Roger Greenaway and Roger Cook. As Mark Frumento wrote in the liner notes of the retrospective Flowerpot Men album Listen To the Flowers Grow (compiled by Carter): "At this point Deram decided that the Flower Pot Men name was no longer commercial and the next single, "Piccolo Man" was released as 'Friends'.... The final Flowerpot Men single was released in 1969, but this time the writing team Roger Cook and Roger Greenaway were behind the production". After one abortive attempt the remains of the Flowerpot Men changed their name to White Plains.

The 1970s started with a disappointment when Mary Hopkin became runner-up in the Eurovision Song Contest with "Knock, Knock Who's There?", which Carter had written with Stephens.

In the following years, Carter released records under many names: Stamford Bridge (number 47 with "Chelsea"), Scarecrow and Stormy Petrel. He also released a single, "Cowboy Convention", as the Ohio Express, an American bubblegum group. A hit came in 1974 with "Beach Baby" – Carter/Shakespeare by First Class in 1974. The record also charted in Europe, Australia and South Africa. Another song written by Carter and his wife Gill Shakespeare was "Dreams Are Ten A Penny" by Kincade which was successful on in Europe. After two First Class albums, Carter started concentrating on writing advertising jingles. Among his work are commercials for British European Airways, Vauxhall Motors, and, for Rowntree's, the 1974 children's song "Please Yourself", which introduced a band of four toy characters based on the four different types of Tots sweets: Jerry Joe, vocals (Jelly); Tom, guitar (Tiger); Tim, drums (Teddy); Candy-Doll, keyboards (Candy). His last shot at a hit single was in 1977 as Starbreaker with "Sound of Summer", which itself began life as music in a commercial for Butlin's.

In more recent times, Carter has been managing the marketing of his back catalogue through Sunny Records, releasing many songs that were never released at the time of recording. This includes Stamford Bridge's albums Come Up And See Us Sometime and The First Day of Your Life (1997).

Carter worked with Micky Keen and Robin Shaw and as a result of this collaboration they released two albums, Men From The Ministry and Midsummer Nights Dreaming (2005).

In late 2005, Carter released the compilation album; John Carter – A Rose by any Other Name (2005).

In the mid-eighties, John served on the Council of the British Academy of Composers and songwriters and the council as a writer-member of the Performing Right Society.

He currently runs, with his wife Gill, his own publishing company and record production company, which concentrates on compiling and promoting his own back-catalogue of songs and records.

In 2012, Carter teamed up with the Brazilian songwriter Salomao Hamzem, who is also a musician and a producer. As writers, they wanted to try something a bit different so hit on the idea of writing songs together in English and Portuguese. When Carter and Hamzem were thinking about names for the band, they came up with the idea of combining the first part Salomao's surname of Hamzem and the last part of Carter making 'Hamzter'. That's why the hamster has become their mascot. Their first album A Friend in Need (2016) was a result of this collaboration, followed by Coming Home (2017) and their third album, Time Will Tell (2018). In 2019, they are planning to release their next album.

With Ivy League members Perry Ford passing in 1999, and Ken Lewis in 2015, Carter is the last surviving member of the original 1960s trio.

== See also ==
- Carter & Lewis

== Sources ==
- Mark Frumento, liner notes of Listen To the Flowers Grow (RPM Retro 809), April 2007
- Mark Frumento, liner notes John Carter – A Rose by any Other Name (Rev-Ola REV 84), January 2005
- Bob Stanley, liner notes The John Carter Anthology – Measure by Measure (RPM rpmd268), 2003
- Melody Maker 1962-1979
- New Musical Express 1963-1979
- Record Mirror 1964-1967
- Song list
