= My Pledge of Love =

1969 single by Joe Jeffrey Group

Single by Joe Jeffrey Group

from the album My Pledge of Love
- B-side: "Margie"
- Released: April 1969
- Genre: Rhythm and blues; Pop
- Length: 2:43
- Label: Wand / Scepter
- Songwriters: Joe Stafford, Jr.
- Producers: Jerry Meyers; Alan Klein

Joe Jeffrey Group singles chronology
"My Pledge of Love" (1969)	"Dreamin' Till Then" (1969)

"My Pledge of Love" is a song written and performed by singer-songwriter Joe Stafford, Jr. of the American rhythm-and-blues band Joe Jeffrey Group. It was released in April 1969, as the group's first single, and was produced by Jerry Meyers and Alan Klein. It appeared on the group's only album My Pledge of Love, which was released in 1974.

== Background and composition ==
The 2-minute-43-second song is in the key of C major with a tempo of 75 beats per minute.

The song, presumably sung to Stafford's significant other, is about how he "felt so fine" thinking about her one morning, how badly he needs and loves her, and how the song acts as his "pledge of love". In the bridge of the song, Stafford repeats the words "Baby I need your loving, got to have all your loving," which intentional or not, is an interpolation of the chorus from the Four Tops' 1964 hit "Baby I Need Your Loving".

On the B-side is a song titled "Margie".

== Reception and commercial performance ==
Billboard called the record a "driving rhythm ballad by a potent group, given an exceptional vocal workout," while Record World wrote of it, "Teens will be feeling fine when they hear this pick-me-up rock. Joe and [the] gang are infectious," referencing the song's lyrics. Cashbox described it as "pretty kind-of-an-oldie, with an easygoing beat and fine vocal showing that gives the newcomer act a solid piece of hit material."

The song was initially sent to radio stations in Vancouver, (CKLG) and Cleveland, Ohio, before it took off nationally in May and June, 1969, entering the Bubbling Under Hot 100 at number 26 for the week of May 31, 1969, and the Billboard Hot 100 at number 84 for the week ending June 7, 1969, going on to peak at number 14, and spending a total of 12 weeks on the chart. It also charted in several other countries, including Canada, Australia, Brazil, the Netherlands, and the Philippines. It was the group's highest charting hit, and only hit to reach the Hot 100, and as far as known, any of the five other charts, with the exception of their cover of White Plains' "My Baby Loves Lovin'". However, they did reach the Bubbling Under chart with a few future releases, following the success of "My Pledge of Love."

== Cover versions ==
- Tirso Cruz III on his debut studio album, 1969
- James Darren on his album Mammy Blue, 1971

== Charts ==
=== Weekly charts ===
Chart (1969)	Peak position
Australia (Go-Set) (Note: “My Pledge of Love” charted at No. 40 on the Go-Set week of October 4, 1969)	40
Brazil (São Paulo) (IBOPE) (Note: According to the "Hits of the World" section of Billboard magazine, "My Pledge of Love" peaked at number 1 in Rio de Janeiro for the week ending January 24, 1970, while it peaked at number 3 in Sao Paulo for the week ending March 14, 1970.)	3
Brazil (Rio de Janeiro) (IBOPE) (Note: According to the "Hits of the World" section of Billboard magazine, "My Pledge of Love" peaked at number 1 in Rio de Janeiro for the week ending January 24, 1970, while it peaked at number 3 in Sao Paulo for the week ending March 14, 1970.)	1
Canada (RPM)	6
Netherlands (Dutch Top 40)	18
Philippines (Hits of the World)	8
US Cash Box Top 100	13
US Billboard Hot 100	14

=== Year-end charts ===
Chart (1969)	Peak position
US (Joel Whitburn's Pop Annual)	120
