= Gimme Dat Ding (album) =

Compilation album by The Sweet/The Pipkins
- Released: December 1970
- Recorded: 1968–1970
- Genres: Bubblegum; pop rock
- Label: EMI
- Producer: John Burgess

The Sweet/The Pipkins chronology
| Gimme Dat Ding (1970) | Funny How Sweet Co-Co Can Be (1971) |

Professional ratings
Review scores
| Source | Rating |
|---|---|
| AllMusic | 3/5 stars |

Gimme Dat Ding is a split album by English bands The Sweet (side one) and The Pipkins (side two), released on EMI's budget record label, MFP (Music For Pleasure) in 1970. It is named after the 1970 song "Gimme Dat Ding" by the Pipkins. In North America, The Pipkins released a full album of the same name, consisting of the six songs here and an additional four. It charted at No. 27 in Canada and No.132 in the US.

== Background ==
This unusual alliance between two groups so radically opposed is attributed to that, in that time, both shared the same record producer (John Burgess) and the same team of composers.

After the poor commercial results with Burgess, in 1971 The Sweet decided to follow their own way, signing with the successful duet of songwriters Nicky Chinn and Mike Chapman and with a new producer, Phil Wainman. On the other hand, The Pipkins disappeared that same year due to the brief success that their comedy act had in their native Britain.

== Content ==
The Sweet

Side one was given over to (then) fledgling pop band the Sweet and features the A and B-sides of what were three commercially unsuccessful singles (on Parlophone Records) before the band finally found fame with "Funny Funny" released by RCA Records. Despite the cover shot of The Sweet featuring Andy Scott, he was not actually a band member until "Funny Funny" and does not feature on any of these recordings. The band's then-guitarist was Mick Stewart (who replaced original guitarist Frank Torpey) and wrote two of the featured B-sides on this compilation.

The Pipkins

Side two consists of six songs from The Pipkins with a casual and satirical content or humorous elements, in a music hall style in most songs. In their comedy characters, Tony Burrows sings with a harsh voice and Roger Greenaway with a falsetto, accompanied by an uncredited studio band that plays all the instruments.

Among them stands out the humorous song "Gimme Dat Ding", a success in several English-speaking countries around the world, composed by Albert Hammond and Mike Hazlewood. The song was the debut and only hit of importance for the duo, when reaching the No. 6 in the UK singles chart and the No. 9 in Billboard Hot 100 in 1970.

Another minor success was a parody of "Yakety Yak" by The Coasters, a very popular theme at the end of the 50s.

== Track listing ==
=== Side one The Sweet ===
1. "Lollipop Man" (Albert Hammond, Mike Hazlewood)
2. "Time" (Brian Connolly, Steve Priest, Mick Stewart, Mick Tucker)
3. "All You'll Ever Get from Me" (Roger Cook, Roger Greenaway)
4. "The Juicer" (Mick Stewart)
5. "Get on the Line" (Jeff Barry, Andy Kim)
6. "Mr. McGallagher" (Mick Stewart)
- Tracks 1, 2 produced by John Burgess; tracks 3–6 produced by John Burgess and Roger Easterby
- Lew Warburton – arranger, conductor on "Get on the Line"

=== Side two The Pipkins ===
1. "Gimme Dat Ding" (Hammond, Hazlewood)
2. "Yakety Yak" (Jerry Leiber, Mike Stoller)
3. "The People That You Wanna Phone Ya" (Hammond, Hazlewood)
4. "My Baby Loves Lovin'" (Cook, Greenaway)
5. "Busy Line" (Murray Semos, Frank Stanton)
6. "Sunny Honey Girl" (Cook, John Goodison, Greenaway, Tony Hiller)

== Production ==
- Produced by John Burgess
- Big Jim Sullivan – arranger, conductor on "Gimme Dat Ding"
- Gerry Butler – arranger, conductor (tracks 2–6)
