= John Goodison (musician) =

British singer (1943–1988)

- Also known as: Johnny B. Great; Peter Simmons; Peter Simons; Big John
- Born: 1943; Coventry, England
- Died: 3 September 1988 (aged 44–45) Coventry, England
- Occupations: Singer, musician, songwriter, producer
- Formerly of: Brotherhood of Man, Big John's Rock and Roll Circus

John Kenneth Goodison (1943 – 3 September 1988) was an English pop/rock singer, musician, songwriter and producer. He was a member of the original Brotherhood of Man, prior to leading his own number one charting group Big John's Rock and Roll Circus. As a songwriter, he co-wrote the number-one charting song "Give a Little Love" for Bay City Rollers.

Goodison is especially unique in that he made it big in different musical scenes using five different names during the 1960s and 1970s; Johnny B. Great as a solo artist, John Goodison, his real name, as a member of Brotherhood of Man, Big John as a member of Big John's Rock and Roll Circus, and Peter Simmons or Peter Simons as a songwriter.

After a decade of touring as a solo artist or group member, Goodison moved behind the scenes to songwriting and producing. He died on 3 September 1988.

== Early years ==
John Kenneth Goodison was born in 1943 in Coventry. He started singing in choirs as a child. He gave up his engineering apprenticeship to become a full time singer.

== Career ==
=== Early career ===
Goodison signed onto a music label in 1963 under the name Johnny B. Great, a clear play on words to the Chuck Berry song Johnny B. Goode. He appears in the 1964 film "Just For You" singing "If I Had a Hammer" with his own distinctive piano accompaniment. He briefly fronted his own group, Johnny B. Great and The Quotations.

Goodison backed The Walker Brothers on tour. He also worked for CBS Records and recorded "Race with the Devil" by Gun. Goodison arranged tracks for acts including Love Affair and Sue & Sunny.

=== Brotherhood of Man ===
Goodison was in the original line-up of the group Brotherhood of Man with Tony Burrows, Roger Greenaway, and Sue and Sunny from its foundation in 1969, co-writing and performing its 1970 chart hits "United We Stand" and "Where Are You Going to My Love" as well as other songs before leaving the group in 1971. Goodison's strong voice meant that he was the main male lead on songs, often duetting with female lead singer Sunny Leslie on most tracks. "United We Stand" has often been used an anthem for diversity and togetherness. Forty years after the original 1970 hit it was popularised again by becoming a patriotic and spiritual anthem for many during the post 9/11 recovery.

It has also been used as a football chant and by gay rights groups. Taken literally, the song's lyrics convey two lovers who tell each other that no matter what hardships come their way, they will always be together. In general terms, it relates a message of strength in unity.

The Brotherhood of Man was later remade into the group that is still active today, for their song "Save Your Kisses For Me", a song that won the Eurovision Song Contest 1976.

=== Later works ===
As well as being a member of Brotherhood of Man, Goodison was also known as the frontman for his later project Big John's Rock and Roll Circus, a group that had a number one hit in South Africa. The band appeared on the show "Saturday Scene" in 1975, and were introduced on the show by Sally James.

He also used the pseudonyms Peter Simmons and Peter Simons for co-writing songs. Peter Simmons was actually Goodison's cousins name. In 1975 he co-wrote and co-produced The Bay City Rollers' second No. 1 "Give a Little Love" with Phil Wainman, and Status Quo had a Top 40 hit in 1988 with "Who Gets The Love", co-written by Goodison and Pip Williams.

=== Pseudonyms ===
During Goodison's career, he used five different names for recording, producing, and for songwriting, these were:

- Johnny B. Great (play on words to Johnny B. Goode, 1960s)
- John Goodison (his real name, 1960s-1971)
- Big John (1970s)
- Peter Simmons (1970s-?)
- Peter Simons (his cousin's name, 1970s-?)

== Death ==
Goodison died in Coventry on 3 September 1988, at the age of 45, after suffering a heart attack.

== Discography ==
=== Solo ===
==== Singles ====
A-Side	B-Side	Credited As	Year	Note
"School Is In"	"She's a Much Better Lover Than You"	Johnny B. Great and The Goodmen	1963	
"Acapulco 1922"	"You'll Never Leave Him"	Johnny B. Great	1964	

=== Brotherhood of Man ===
==== Albums ====
Title	Album details
United We Stand	Released: August 1970; Label: Deram; Formats: Vinyl, 8-track, CS, CD
We're the Brotherhood of Man	Released: 21 April 1972; Label: Deram; Formats: Vinyl, 8-track, CS

==== Singles ====
Title	Year
"Love One Another"	1969
"United We Stand"	1970
"Where are You Going to My Love"	1970
"This Boy"	1970
"Reach Out Your Hand"	1971
"You and I"	1971
"California Sunday Morning"	1971
"Follow Me"/"Say a Prayer"	1972

=== Big John's Rock and Roll Circus ===
==== Albums ====
Title	Year	Note
Big John's Rock 'n' Roll Circus	1974	
On the Road	1977	

==== Singles ====
A-Side	B-Side	Credited As	Year	Note
"Rockin' in the USA"	"Love"	Big John's Rock and Roll Circus	1974	
"When Will You Be Mine"	"I'm In the Army Now"	Big John's Rock and Roll Circus	1975	
"Lady (Put the Light on Me)"	"Lady (Put the Light on Me)"	Big John's Rock and Roll Circus	1975	
"Summertime Blues"	"Wanting You"	Johnny Goodison	1976	
"Twenty Three"	"I Believe in You"	Big John	19??	
