= Perry Ford =

English musician (1933–1999)

- Also known as: Lou Bryan
- Born: Brian Joseph Pugh; 30 December 1933; Lincoln, England
- Died: 29 April 1999 (aged 65) Lincoln, England
- Genre: Pop
- Occupations: Singer, songwriter, record producer
- Instruments: Vocals, piano
- Years active: 1950s–1999
- Formerly of: Colin Hicks & the Cabin Boys; Vince Taylor; The Ivy League

Perry Ford (born Brian Joseph Pugh, 30 December 1933 – 29 April 1999) was an English pop singer, songwriter, producer and session musician, best known as a member of the Ivy League.

== Life and career ==
Born in Lincoln, he moved to London in the mid-1950s and began singing and playing in Soho clubs. Under the name Lou Bryan, he briefly joined Colin Hicks & the Cabin Boys as a pianist in 1958, and then joined Vince Taylor's band, the Playboys. In 1959, using the name Perry Ford, he recorded the first of three singles on the Parlophone label, produced by George Martin, but none were successful. However, he found some success as a songwriter, co-writing Adam Faith's 1960 UK chart hit "Someone Else's Baby" with Les Vandyke, and co-writing "Caroline" with Tony Hiller for the Fortunes. Although "Caroline" was not a chart hit, it became widely known as the theme song for the pirate radio station Radio Caroline.

In 1964, after working with talent manager Reg Calvert in Denmark Street, and according to some sources playing piano on the Kinks' "You Really Got Me", he teamed up with the songwriting and singing duo of John Carter and Ken Lewis to form the vocal harmony group the Ivy League. Initially working as backing singers, they featured on several chart hits in the mid-1960s, including Sandie Shaw's "Always Something There to Remind Me", Tom Jones' "It's Not Unusual", and the Who's "I Can't Explain". The trio began recording for Piccadilly Records, and had several hits between 1965 and 1967, including "Tossing and Turning", "That's Why I'm Crying" and "Willow Tree", all written by Ford with Carter and Lewis.

After Carter and Lewis left the group in 1966, Ford continued to use the name Ivy League with new members until the mid-1970s, and also worked as a songwriter and record producer. He later moved back to Lincoln, where he died in 1999 at the age of 65.
