= Joe Jeffrey Group =

American rhythm and blues band (1969–70)

- Origin: Cleveland, Ohio, U.S.
- Genres: R&B
- Years active: 1969–1970
- Past members: Joe Jeffrey; Al Russ; Charles Perry; Ron Browning

The Joe Jeffrey Group was an American rhythm and blues band. Their best-known song was "My Pledge of Love", which reached No. 14 on the Billboard Hot 100 in 1969.

The group consisted of Joe Jeffrey (born Joseph Stafford Jr., Cleveland, Ohio; vocals, guitar), Al Russ (bass), Charles Perry (percussion), and Ron Browning (drums).

== Career ==
The biggest hit of the Joe Jeffrey Group was "My Pledge of Love", which charted at No. 14 on the Billboard Hot 100, from July 26 to August 2, 1969, and entered Vancouver's CKLG chart on May 23, 1969.

The group also recorded a version of "My Baby Loves Lovin'", which charted concurrently with the bigger hit by White Plains. Their version reached No. 115 on the Billboard Bubbling Under chart.

In the early to mid-1970s, Jeffrey played in the greater Cleveland area three or four nights a week in a bar off Miles Road, named "In the Woods". The dark road off Miles Road was literally in the woods. A solo act, he played guitar and sang. His repertoire included "My Pledge of Love", "My Baby Loves Lovin'", old standards, Stevie Wonder, various R&B artists, and his version of "Impossible Dream".

Stafford died of cancer at his Cleveland home on September 4, 2016, aged 80.

== Discography ==
=== Singles ===
List of singles, with selected chart positions and details
Title	Year	Peak chart positions							Length (A-side only)	Label	Credits (A-side only)	Album
Title	Year	US Pop	US Cash.	AUS (Note: “My Pledge of Love” charted at No. 40 on the Go-Set week of October 4, 1969.)	BR (IBOPE) (Note: According to the "Hits of the World" section of Billboard magazine, "My Pledge of Love" peaked at No. 1 in Rio de Janeiro for the week ending January 24, 1970, while it peaked at No. 3 in São Paulo for the week ending March 14, 1970.)	CAN	NLD	PHL	Length (A-side only)	Label	Credits (A-side only)	Album
"My Pledge of Love" (b/w "Margie")	1969	14	13	40	3	6	18	8	2:44	Wand / Scepter	Joe Stafford, Jr.; Jerry Meyers; Alan Klein; Al Russ	My Pledge of Love (1974) (Note: "The Train" is not included.)
"Dreamin' Till Then" (b/w "The Train")	1969	108	—	—	—	—	—	—	3:01	Wand / Scepter	Mark James; Chips Moman; Jerry Meyers; Alan Klein; Glen Spreen	My Pledge of Love (1974)
"Hey Hey Woman" (b/w "The Chance of Loving You")	1969	109	—	—	—	—	—	—	2:07	Wand / Scepter	Johnny Christopher; R. West; Chips Moman; Jerry Meyers; Alan Klein; Glen Spreen	My Pledge of Love (1974)
"My Baby Loves Lovin'" (b/w "The Chance of Loving You")	1970	115	—	23	—	—	—	—	2:56	Wand / Scepter	Roger Cook; Roger Greenaway; Jerry Meyers; Alan Klein; Al Russ	My Pledge of Love (1974)
"—" denotes a song that did not chart, or is unknown to have charted in that territory.

=== Albums ===
- My Pledge of Love (1974)
