= Pledge of Love =

Pledge of Love may refer to:

- "Pledge of Love" (Kenneth Copeland song), 1957 song by Kenneth Copeland, covered that year by Mitchell Torok and by Curtis Lee in 1961.
- "Pledge of Love", 1967 song from Honey (Bobby Goldsboro album)
- "Pledge of Love", 1984 song from Frontier Days (album)

== See also ==
- "My Pledge of Love", 1969 song by the Joe Jeffrey Group
- "Pledging My Love", 1954 song by Ferdinand Washington and Don Robey
