= When You Are a King =

Single by White Plains

from the album When You Are a King
- B-side: "The World Gets Better With Love"
- Released: 5 July 1971
- Genre: Bubblegum pop
- Label: Deram
- Songwriter(s): John Hill and Roger Hill
- Producer(s): Roger Greenaway

White Plains singles chronology
"Every Little Move She Makes" (1971)	"When You Are a King" (1971)	"Gonna Miss Her Mississippi" (1971)

"When You Are a King" is a 1971 pop song by British band White Plains. It was written by John and Roger Hill, in contrast to most White Plains songs that were written by Roger Cook and Roger Greenaway. Produced by Roger Greenaway. Featuring Pete Nelson on lead vocals.

== Release and charts ==
"When you are a king
Never do a thing
Four and twenty blackbirds sing along
Royal gifts they all will bring"

The song was released as a single with "The World Gets Better With Love" on its B-side. It was included as the title song in the When You Are a King album, released in the UK by Deram Records. It was included in the UK White Plains compilation album, My Baby Loves Lovin' (1993; track #16).

"When You Are a King" reached number 13 on the UK Singles Chart. In the Netherlands, it topped out at number 4 in the Top 100, 9 in the Top 40, and, in the year 2001, 844 in the all time Top 2000. It charted 100 in the Australian ARIA Charts.

== Legacy ==
Robin Carmody of Freaky Trigger described the song as an "impeccable, mock-regal" example of 1971 British bubblegum pop and named it Tony Burrows' "second good song" after White Plains' 1970 hit "I’ve Got You On My Mind".

=== Covers ===
The first to cover the song, in 1971, was the Irish singer Jackie Lee, who included the song in her album Jackie's Junior Choice. An anonymous cover is included in the 1972 multi-artist collection Hot Hits 6 (track #5). In 1976, the song was covered by an Anglo-Irish girl group, the Nolan Sisters.

A popular Hebrew cover version, Melekh Ha'Olam (King of the World; can also mean God), was translated and recorded by the Israeli singer-songwriter, Shlomo Artzi. It was included as the title song in his 2000 studio album. This album sold over 200,000 copies; an unprecedented achievement in the small Israeli music market.
