= Ken Lewis (songwriter) =

English singer (1940-2015)

- Born: Kenneth Alan James Hawker; 3 December 1940
- Origin: Small Heath, Birmingham, England
- Died: 2 August 2015 (aged 74) Cherry Hinton, Cambridge, England
- Genres: Pop
- Occupations: Singer, songwriter, record producer
- Instrument: Vocals
- Years active: 1960s–1970s

Kenneth Alan James Hawker (3 December 1940 – 2 August 2015) known as Ken Lewis, was an English singer, songwriter and record producer. He is considered one of the more successful songwriters of the 1960s as a result of his collaborations with John Carter. His biggest success was "Can't You Hear My Heartbeat", which was a 1965 US number 2 hit single for Herman's Hermits.

== Life and career ==
=== Early life ===
Kenneth Alan James Hawker was born in Small Heath, Birmingham, England. While still at primary school, Lewis met his future songwriting partner John Shakespeare. They formed a skiffle band in the 1950s called LVI, when they began writing songs together. In 1960 the duo went to London, and presented themselves under their songwriting pseudonyms John Carter and Ken Lewis. Terry Kennedy became their manager and convinced them to start their own band as an outlet for their songs.

=== Career ===
In 1961, the first single by Carter-Lewis and the Southerners was released, "Back on the Scene". The band were not successful, and their main claim to fame remains a brief stint that Jimmy Page did as their lead guitarist. The band also featured twice as "guests" on the Beatles' 1963 radio show Pop Goes The Beatles.

In 1964 they met Perry Ford, who worked as an engineer in a small recording studio in Denmark Street, London. They noticed their voices blended well and started recording demos together, resulting in a single on Pye Records, "What More Do You Want" as the Ivy League. Their luck changed when Herman's Hermits recorded "Can't You Hear My Heartbeat" and took it to number 2 on the Billboard Hot 100 in the United States. In the UK it was a smaller hit for Goldie and the Gingerbreads.

They then provided backing vocals on "I Can't Explain", by the Who. In 1965 and 1966, The Ivy League scored four UK chart hits, including "Tossing and Turning", which reached number 3 in the UK Singles Chart. Other songs were penned for Brenda Lee – "Is It True?", the Music Explosion – "Little Bit O' Soul", Dana Gillespie – "Thank You Boy" and Peter and Gordon – "Sunday for Tea".

In early 1966, Carter decided he had enough of touring and was replaced by Tony Burrows from The Kestrels. In 1967, Lewis left the Ivy League and was replaced by Neil Landon. Lewis started writing and recording again with Carter. One of the first results was "Let's Go To San Francisco", released as by the Flower Pot Men. When the single became a hit, a band was put together to give the "band" faces, as both Carter and Lewis refused to tour again. The vocal quartet that mimed to the records included Tony Burrows and Neil Landon, leaving Perry Ford to carry on The Ivy League. In late 1967 Carter and Lewis formed Sunny Records as their production company. Starting in early 1968 the Carter/Lewis output became more confusing. Songs intended for the Flower Pot Men were released billed as by Friends, Haystack and Dawn Chorus, only to be re-released in this century as the Flower Pot Men. The "touring" Flower Pot Men started recording songs by Roger Greenaway and eventually changed their name to White Plains.

After a minor success billed as Stamford Bridge (UK number 47 with "Chelsea"), Lewis decided to leave the music industry in 1971, suffering from depression. He went to live in Wallsend.

Despite not being a driver, he travelled extensively during his earlier years, visiting most of Europe's capital cities as well as many other parts of the world. He was also briefly married in his early life.

=== Later life and death ===
He spent much of the 1990s in a starter home in the Petersfield district of Cambridge, with few possessions other than a piano. He was a popular member of the local community, visiting the elderly, vulnerable and isolated. Many of his neighbours were unaware of either his musical past or of his connection to the nearby St Matthew's Church, until he wrote an article for the locally delivered church magazine, alluding to his earlier life. At the end of that decade he moved briefly to a nearby retirement home, before leaving Cambridge to move to a nursing home in Staffordshire. Later he returned to Cambridge, where his sister currently resides, spending the remainder of his life at a nursing home in the Cherry Hinton district, where he succumbed to complications associated with type 1 diabetes, on 2 August 2015.

His funeral took place in the East Chapel of Cambridge Crematorium on 20 August 2015. His former writing partner John Shakespeare (alias John Carter) was among those attending. "Let's Go to San Francisco" was played at the end of the ceremony. The funeral date coincided with that of 1960s contemporary, Cilla Black.

== See also ==
- Carter & Lewis

== Sources ==
- Mark Frumento, liner notes of Listen To the Flowers Grow (RPM Retro 809), April 2007
- Mark Frumento, liner notes John Carter – A Rose by any Other Name (Rev-Ola REV 84), January 2005.
- Bob Stanley, liner notes The John Carter Anthology – Measure by Measure (RPM rpmd268), 2003
- Melody Maker 1962–1979
- New Musical Express 1963–1979
- Record Mirror 1964–1967
