= Gimme Dat Ding =

Single by The Pipkins

from the album Gimme Dat Ding
- B-side: "To Love You"
- Released: May 1970
- Genre: Novelty; music hall; bubblegum pop
- Length: 2:10
- Label: EMI
- Songwriters: Albert Hammond and Mike Hazlewood
- Producer: John Burgess

Official Audio
- "Gimme Dat Ding" on YouTube

"Gimme Dat Ding" is a 1970 popular UK song, of the novelty type, sung by "one-hit wonder" The Pipkins, and written and composed by Albert Hammond and Mike Hazlewood. Released as a single, it is the title selection of an album which The Pipkins recorded and released on the EMI Columbia Records label. It also appeared on a compilation album of the same name, which The Pipkins shared with another up-and-coming UK group, The Sweet. It has also been included on many other compilation albums. "Gimme Dat Ding" was arranged by Big Jim Sullivan.

== Chart history ==
The song peaked at number 6 on the UK Chart in March/April 1970. It reached number 7 in Canada, number 9 on the US Hot 100 and number 20 in US Easy Listening. It did best in New Zealand, where it reached number 1.

=== Weekly charts ===
Chart (1970)	Peak position
Australia (Kent Music Report)	61
Canada RPM Top Singles (2wks@7)	7
Ireland (IRMA)	7
Netherlands (Single Top 100)	8
New Zealand (Listener)	1
South Africa (Springbok)	15
UK (The Official Charts Company)	6
US Billboard Hot 100	9
US Billboard Easy Listening	20
US Cash Box Top 100	7

=== Year-end charts ===
Chart (1970)	Rank
Canada	94
Netherlands (Single Top 100)	96
UK	87
US Billboard Hot 100	86
US Cash Box	73

== Song profile ==
"Gimme Dat Ding" is a call-and-response duet between a deep, gravelly voice, that of Tony Burrows, and a high tenor, that of Roger Greenaway. The voices are said to represent a piano and a metronome. The piano is honky-tonk style.

When Hammond and Hazlewood wrote and composed "Gimme Dat Ding," it was one selection from their musical sequence "Oliver in the Overworld," which formed part of the British children's show Little Big Time, hosted by Freddie and the Dreamers; this narrated a surreal story of a little boy seeking the parts to mend his grandfather clock. The lyrics relate to this story, the song being sung by a metronome who has been expelled by the Clockwork King. The "ding" has been stolen from the metronome by the "Undercog". The original version, as performed by Freddie Garrity, was released on the album Oliver in the Overworld in 1970.

== Cover versions ==
Comedian Frankie Davidson and pop group Maple Lace each released a cover version in Australia in 1970, reaching 21 on the local charts, which was credited to both artists. A Czech version "Gimi Det Ding" was also released in 1970 as a vinyl single with alternative Czech lyrics (a silence-loving man complaining about his noisy female neighbour singing). The Norwegian vocal group Bjelleklang covered the song on their album YppeRu’ dOnK in 1994. The song was called Gummihatt (Swing) which is Rubberhat (Swing) in English.

In the UK, interest in the song resurfaced in the 1990s when the Maynards confectionery company used it in a popular television commercial for their Just Fruits fruit pastille and fruit gum range between 1992 and 1994; the song began reappearing on radio playlists during that era. In 1997, Dairylea also used the song in a series of advertisements in the UK.

An instrumental version arranged by Ronnie Aldrich was frequently used as background music during comedy sketches in The Benny Hill Show.

The song is also played in the year finale of the Russian game show 'What? Where? When?' while a TV viewer who wrote the question currently played sits alongside the 'experts'.

The Shaggs, a foundational outsider music rock band formed by three sisters living in Fremont, New Hampshire, released a cover of the song on the album Shaggs' Own Thing. It was recorded live at a dance party in the Fremont, NH, town hall.
