= The First Class =

British pop music studio-based group

- Origin: England
- Genres: Rock, pop
- Years active: 1974–mid-1980s
- Label: UK
- Past members: John Carter; Tony Burrows; Chas Mills

The First Class were a British studio-based pop music group, put together by songwriter and record producer John Carter. Compared by critics to the Beach Boys, they are best known for their 1974 hit song "Beach Baby," a top 20 hit in both the US and UK, and number one in Canada.

== Career ==
The First Class was the studio creation of British singer/songwriter John Carter, who hired singers Tony Burrows (previously with The Flower Pot Men and Edison Lighthouse) and Chas Mills to join him as an outlet for material Carter wrote, with his creative partner and wife, Gillian (Jill) Shakespeare. In the 1960s, Carter had formed the group Carter-Lewis and the Southerners with fellow producer Ken Lewis. That band dissolved when Carter and Lewis began working extensively as studio singers, appearing on the hits "It's Not Unusual" (Tom Jones), "I Can't Explain" (The Who), "Hi Ho Silver Lining" (Jeff Beck), "(There's) Always Something There to Remind Me" (Sandie Shaw), "Excerpt From A Teenage Opera" (Keith West), and "Out of Time" (Chris Farlowe). Concurrently with this session work, Carter was a member of The Ivy League, leaving in 1966 to be replaced by Burrows.

Carter and Shakespeare wrote the song "Beach Baby". Carter immediately created a studio band, enlisting musicians Burrows and Mills, to record the song for Jonathan King's UK Records record label – under the name The First Class. In 1974, the song became a hit in the UK, peaking at number 13, and in the US, peaking at no. 4 on the Billboard Hot 100. It was positively reviewed in American media, with Billboard naming "Beach Baby" one of the best tracks on the First Class' eponymous album and Cash Box praising the "perfect surfin' arrangement". Allmusic and Record World called First Class a British answer to American band The Beach Boys.

The group recorded a follow-up single, "Bobby Dazzler", and material for their eponymous first album, The First Class. While there was some demand for live performances by the group, neither Carter nor Burrows had the time for or interest in touring, so a group including bassist Robin Shaw (previously of The Flower Pot Men and White Plains), lead singer Del John, guitarist Spencer James (lead singer with The Searchers from 1986-2019), keyboardist Clive Barrett and drummer Eddie Richards (previously of Edison Lighthouse) was assembled to perform a number of dates as The First Class. Although that quintet was pictured and credited along with Carter, Burrows and Mills on the cover of the band's first album, none of the "live" quintet actually performed on "Beach Baby" or any of the album's other tracks.

"Bobby Dazzler" and later singles "Dreams Are Ten a Penny" number 83 US, "Won't Somebody Help Me" and "Funny How Love Can Be" (number 74 US, a remake of the 1965 hit by The Ivy League, on which Carter had been one of the vocalists) failed to chart in the UK. Officially now down to a trio (Burrows, Carter and Mills) supported by studio session players, the group released an unsuccessful second album (SST) in 1976.

After the issue of the second album, The First Class became strictly an occasional studio venture, while various members pursued other work. Still, the band continued to record and release non-album singles over the next several years, for a variety of labels: "Broken Toy" (1978), "Song On The Wind" (1979), "Ocean of Glass" (1981) and "Gimme Little Sign" (1983). None of these singles charted or received much attention, and by the mid-1980s the First Class effectively ceased to exist.

Chas Mills subsequently retired from the music industry to run a restaurant in North London. Tony Burrows went on working as a solo artist. John Carter remained active writing jingles and managing his back catalogue. He later reflected on The First Class: "Making the First Class albums was a very happy and creative time. Who knows if we ever come up with another suitable song, maybe we will all get back together one day and record under that name again?"

== Discography ==
=== Original albums ===
- September 1974: The First Class UK Records. UKAL R 1008.
- October 1976: The First Class SST UK Records. UKAL 1022.

=== Compilation CDs ===
- 1993: Beach Baby & Other Assorted Love Songs (Century Records, Japan)
- 1994: Golden Classics (Collectables Records, US)
- 1996: The First Class/The First Class SST (compilation of 2 LPs) (See For Miles Records, UK)
- 1999: Beach Baby: The Very Best of The First Class (Collectables Records, US)
- 2005: Summer Sound Sensations (RPM Records, UK)
- 2023: Beach Baby: The Complete Recordings (Cherry Red Records, UK)

=== Singles ===
Year	Single	Chart Positions			
Year	Single	US	CAN	UK	AUS
1974	"Beach Baby"	4	1	13	11
1974	"Bobby Dazzler"	-	-	-	-
1974	"Dreams are Ten a Penny"	83	-	-	-
1975	"What Became of Me"	-	-	-	-
1975	"Funny How Love Can Be"	74	80	-	-
1975	"Life Is Whatever You Want It To Be"	-	-	-	-
1975	"I Was a Star"	-	-	-	-
1976	"Beach Baby (Re-Release)"	-	-	-	-
1976	"Child's Play"	-	-	-	-
1976	"Ain't No Love"	-	-	-	-
1977	"Too Many Golden Oldies"	-	-	-	-
1978	"Broken Toy"	-	-	-	-
1980	"Beach Baby (Re-Release)"	-	-	-	-
1982	"Beach Baby (Re-Release)"	-	-	-	-
1983	"Gimme Little Sign"	-	-	-	-

== See also ==
- List of 1970s one-hit wonders in the United States
- List of performers on Top of the Pops
