= Tossing and Turning (The Ivy League song) =

Single by The Ivy League
- B-side: "Graduation Day"
- Released: 1965
- Genre: Pop
- Label: Piccadilly
- Songwriters: Carter, Lewis, Ford
- Producer: Terry Kennedy

"Tossing and Turning" is a song written by John Carter, Ken Lewis and Perry Ford and performed by the Ivy League. Released as a single in 1965, the song became the group's most successful hit, peaking at number 3 on the UK Singles Chart, staying there for 13 weeks. It was the group's biggest hit. It was also the group's only hit in the US, charting at number 83 on the Billboard Hot 100. It peaked on the New Zealand Lever Hit Parade at #7.
