= Little Bit O' Soul =

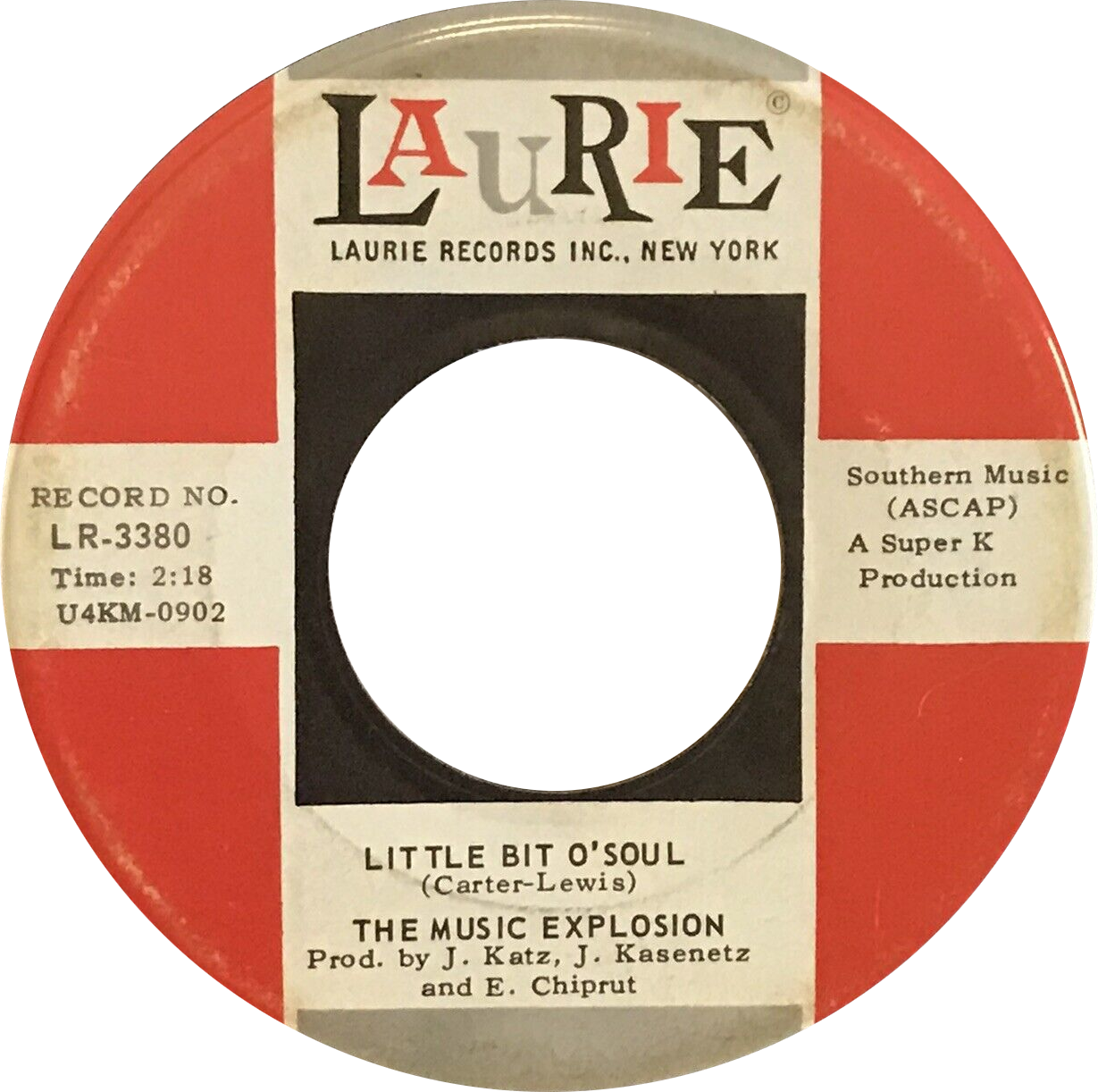
- One of side-A labels of the US single

Single by The Music Explosion

from the album Little Bit O' Soul
- B-side: "I See the Light"
- Released: April 1967
- Genre: Bubblegum; garage rock; R&B
- Length: 2:18
- Label: Laurie
- Songwriters: John Carter; Ken Lewis
- Producers: Jeffry Katz, Jerry Kasenetz, Elliot Chiprut

The Music Explosion singles chronology
"Little Black Egg" (1966)	"Little Bit O' Soul" (1967)	"Sunshine Games" (1967)

"Little Bit O' Soul" is a song written in 1964 by British songwriters John Carter and Ken Lewis. It was originally recorded by Coventry band the Little Darlings, and released in 1965 on Fontana Records in the UK.

== The Music Explosion version ==
In 1967, the song was popularized in the United States by garage band the Music Explosion, whose version went to No. 1 on the Record World 100 Top Pops chart. and reached No. 2 on the Billboard Hot 100. It was the only hit for The Music Explosion. In Canada the song also reached No. 1, and the follow-up single "Sunshine Games" reached No. 42.

The single was certified Gold by the Recording Industry Association of America for sales of one million copies. It appeared on an album of the same name released in August 1967.

"Little Bit O' Soul" has been subsequently covered by several bands including Ramones, the Linda Lindas and 2 Live Crew, who sampled the song's melody. The hit single's flip side, "I See The Light" (featuring a surf guitar bridge), was covered by the Fourth Amendment and had a resurgence on some radio stations in the Midwest in 1971.
