= Hot Hits 6 =

Compilation album by various artists
- Released: 1971
- Label: Music for Pleasure

Hot Hits 6 is an album of anonymous cover-versions that reached number 1 in the UK. From 7 August 1971 to 8 January 1972, budget albums were included in the main album charts, allowing this to chart.

== Track listing ==
From Discogs.

1. Zoo Dee Zoo Zong
2. River Deep Mountain High
3. Banner Man
4. Me and You and a Dog Named Boo
5. When You Are a King
6. Pied Piper
7. Chirpy Chirpy Cheep Cheep
8. Tom-Tom Turnaround
9. Don't Let It Die
10. Black and White
11. Monkey Spanner
12. Co-co
