= Kincade (band) =

English pop band

- Origin: England
- Years active: 1972–1977
- Label: Penny Farthing Records
- Members: John Carter

Kincade were an English band that was formed in 1972. In that year, they had their hit single, "Dreams are Ten a Penny", but the band itself did not exist at the time. The song was written by John Carter and his wife Gill. Carter also sang all the vocals and played the guitar on the record. The song was released by the British record producer on the Penny Farthing Records label. Although the record was unsuccessful in the UK, it reached the top 10 in Australia and #2 in Germany, spending six months on the charts there, and sold a million copies.

== John Kincade ==
"Dreams Are Ten a Penny" eventually got on the charts in Australia, Scandinavia, the Netherlands, and South Africa. In order to promote the hit, Penny Farthing Records recruited John Knowles as the frontman for Kincade since Carter was reluctant to tour as the performing artist. Knowles was successful as the frontman for Kincade and went on to change his name to John Kincade. Consequently, Larry Page launched John Kincade as a solo artist, which resulted in several hit songs on the German charts from 1973 to 1975.

== Kincade (the group) ==
In December 1972, Paul Griggs had a call from Larry Page to form a touring band for Kincade, and Griggs recruited his brother Nigel and Rick Williams. A month later, they made a promotional trip to Spain, performing on a couple of television programmes, undertaking press interviews and making several personal appearances.

By this time another single, "Do You Remember Marilyn", and a Kincade album had been released. They had been recorded by Carter using session musicians. The assembled group continued promoting material for the rest of 1973, making several visits to Germany. Their last appearance as Kincade was on the German TV show, Disco 73 in December 1973, with a song called "Big Hand For Annie". This song failed to chart and as a result the three musicians never appeared on stage as Kincade again. Future releases of Kincade would be without pictures of musicians.
