= Let's Go to San Francisco =

- CD compilation titled after the song

Single by The Flower Pot Men
- A-side: "Let's Go to San Francisco (Part 1)"
- B-side: "Let's Go to San Francisco (Part 2)"
- Released: 4 August 1967
- Genre: Psychedelic pop
- Length: 3:16 (Part 1); 2:40 (Part 2)
- Label: Deram
- Songwriters: John Carter and Ken Lewis
- Producers: John Carter and Ken Lewis

The Flower Pot Men singles chronology
"Let's Go to San Francisco" (1967)	"A Walk in the Sky" (1967)

"Let's Go to San Francisco" is the only UK-charting single by the British pop group The Flower Pot Men. The song was written and produced by John Carter and Ken Lewis, engineered by John Mackswith and released in 1967 on 7" single format. Carter also sang the lead vocal in the recording. It is regarded as a work of the 1960s California Sound.

== Reception ==
The song was a Top 10 hit single in a number of countries. It peaked at No. 12 in New Zealand, No. 9 in Norway, No. 8 in Ireland and No. 4 in the United Kingdom.

Carter was joined in harmonies by Tony Burrows; both were part of The First Class' single "Beach Baby", which quotes the melody of "Let's Go To San Francisco" at the end.

A light-hearted pastiche of the work of Brian Wilson, the song achieved a similar musical level and has remained popular. The song could be mistaken for a Beach Boys single.

== Compilation album usage ==
The song has since appeared on many "best of the '60s" compilation albums since its release, such as the 1997 Polygram TV release The First Summer Of Love: SIXTIES.

== Italian covers ==
There were two different versions with different texts written in Italian; the more famous was "Inno", performed by the Milanese band Dik Dik. There was also "Trovare un mondo" ("To find a world"), sung by a little-known artist, Mimmo Diamante, and published by ARC, a subsidiary label of RCA Italiana.

== Other covers ==
British band Psykick Holiday did a cover in 2017 to mark the 50th anniversary of peace & Love & song. It was a double 'A' single with Scott McKenzie's 'San Francisco' being the other track. The band also did a summer of love EP featuring French & Spanish versions of the two songs.

In 2020 & 2022 the English tracks came out under main vocalist Vanessa White Smith, of Psykick Holiday, on the Compilations' Femme Fatales of Music Vol.1 & 2. All releases were on Future Legend Records.
