= The Music Explosion =

American garage rock band

Background information
- Origin: Mansfield, Ohio, United States
- Genres: Garage rock, psychedelic rock
- Years active: 1966–1969, 1980–present
- Labels: Laurie Records, Attack Records
- Past members: Jamie Lyons (deceased); Don Atkins; Rick Nesta; Bob Avery; Burton Stahl (deceased); Dane Donohue; Charles Barker (deceased); Christopher Palid

The Music Explosion was an American garage rock band from Mansfield, Ohio, discovered and signed by record producers Jerry Kasenetz and Jeffry Katz.

The quintet is best known for their number two hit, "Little Bit O' Soul". The single was given gold record status by the RIAA. Written by British songwriters John Carter and Ken Lewis, who had previously written big hits for The Ivy League and Herman's Hermits, the song was originally recorded in 1964 by UK beat group The Little Darlings. The Music Explosion version (released as a single by Laurie Records in 1967 and subsequently issued by Buddah Records) was the band's only top 40 hit. The band's chart success paved the way for tours with contemporaries like The Left Banke and The Easybeats.

On the band's sole album, Kasenetz and Katz wrote several of the tracks, which were blatant rewrites of existing songs. Bassist Burton Stahl later acknowledged these claims.

Lead singer Jamie Lyons (born James Lewis Lyons on January 31, 1949, in Galion, Ohio) also recorded several solo singles for the Laurie label while a member of the group. His first single, "Soul Struttin'", became a Northern soul hit. Lyons died of heart failure at his home in Little River, South Carolina on September 25, 2006, at age 57. The band continued touring and playing festivals with a new lead singer. Drummer Bob Avery later became a member of Crazy Elephant.

Burton Stahl died at age 75 in his hometown of Mansfield, Ohio on April 27, 2023, after a brief illness. In addition to playing many gigs over the years, he worked for Downtown Mansfield Inc. leading community revitalization projects.

== Band members ==
=== Music Explosion ===
- James "Jamie" Lyons – singer, percussion (died 2006)
- Donald (Tudor) Atkins – guitar (died October 18, 1999)
- Richard Nesta – guitar
- Burton Stahl – bass guitar (died 2023)
- Christopher Palid — bass guitar
- Charles Barker – drums (died 1997)
- Robert Avery – drums

with Super K staff musicians

== Discography ==
=== Singles ===
Year	Title	Peak chart position	Record label	B-side	Album
Year	Title	US	Record label	B-side	Album
1966	"Little Black Egg"	–	Attack Records	"Stay by My Side"	
1967	"Little Bit O' Soul"	2	Laurie Records	"I See the Light"	Little Bit O' Soul
1967	"Sunshine Games"	63	Laurie Records	"Can't Stop Now"	
1967	"We Gotta Go Home"	103	Laurie Records	"Hearts and Flowers"	
1968	"What You Want (Baby I Want You)"	119	Laurie Records	"Road Runner"	
1968	"Where Are We Going"	–	Laurie Records	"Flash"	
1968	"Yes Sir"	120	Laurie Records	"Dazzling"	
1969	"What's Your Name"	(Note: "What's Your Name" reached number 117 on the US Record World singles chart.)	Laurie Records	"Call Me Anything"	
1969	"The Little Black Egg" (re-release)	–	Laurie Records	"Stay by My Side"	

=== Albums ===
- Little Bit O'Soul (#178) – Laurie SLLP-2040—8/67

Side one:
"Little Bit O' Soul" / "I See the Light" / "Everybody" / "Love, Love, Love, Love, Love" / "Good Time Feeling" / "96 Tears"
Side two:
"Can't Stop Now" / "Let Yourself Go" / "Patches Dawn" / "One Potato Two" / "What Did I Do to Deserve Such a Fate" / "(Hey) La, La, La"

"Love, Love, Love, Love, Love" is identical to a recording of the same name by Terry Knight and the Pack (released on the Lucky Eleven label), but has a re-recorded vocal track.

=== Compilations ===
- Little Bit O' Soul—The Best of the Music Explosion—Sundazed—2002

"Little Bit O'Soul" / "I See the Light" / "Everybody" / "Love, Love, Love, Love, Love" / "Good Time Feeling" / "96 Tears" / "Can't Stop Now" / "Let Yourself Go" / "Patches Dawn" / "One Potato Two" / "What Did I Do to Deserve Such a Fate" / "(Hey) La, La, La" / "Little Black Egg" / "Stay by My Side" / "Sunshine Games" / "We Gotta Go Home" / "Hearts and Flowers" / "What You Want (Baby I Want You)" / "Road Runner" / "Where Are We Going" / "Yes Sir" / "Dazzling" / "Jack in the Box" / "What's Your Name"

== See also ==
- List of 1960s one-hit wonders in the United States
