= Sunny Honey Girl =

1970 song by the Pipkins

Single by the Pipkins

from the album Gimme Dat Ding
- B-side: "The People Dat You Wanna Phone Ya"
- Released: August 1970
- Genre: Novelty; bubblegum pop
- Length: 3:22
- Label: Columbia
- Songwriter(s): Roger Cook; Roger Greenaway; John Goodison; Tony Hiller
- Producer(s): John Burgess

The Pipkins singles chronology
"Yakety Yak" (1970)	"Sunny Honey Girl" (1970)	"Pipkins Maxi Party" (1970)

"Sunny Honey Girl" is a song by the British musical group the Pipkins. It was written by Roger Cook, Roger Greenaway, John Goodison and Tony Hiller and was released as a single only in New Zealand in August 1970, charting for one week at number 18 on the New Zealand Listener Pop-O-Meter chart. The song appeared on the Pipkins' 1970 album Gimme Dat Ding.

== Cliff Richard version ==
"Sunny Honey Girl"
- Cover of the single released in Germany

Single by Cliff Richard
- B-side: "Don't Move Away" "I Was Only Fooling Myself"
- Released: 8 January 1971
- Recorded: 16 November 1970
- Studio: EMI Studios, London
- Genre: Pop rock
- Length: 2:55
- Label: Columbia
- Songwriter(s): Roger Cook; Roger Greenaway; John Goodison; Tony Hiller
- Producer(s): Norrie Paramor

Cliff Richard singles chronology
"I Ain't Got Time Anymore" (1970)	"Sunny Honey Girl" (1971)	"Silvery Rain" (1971)

In January 1971, British singer Cliff Richard released his own version of the song as a non-album single. His version peaked at number 19 on the UK Singles Chart.

=== Release ===
Richard recorded "Sunny Honey Girl" in November 1970 at EMI Studios (later renamed Abbey Road) and was arranged by and features the orchestra of the Shadows drummer Brian Bennett. It was released with two B-sides. The first, "Don't Move Away", was written by Valerie Avon and Harold Spiro and is a duet with Olivia Newton-John. The second, "I Was Only Fooling Myself", was written by Jimmy Campbell.

Reviewing for Disc and Music Echo, David Hughes described "Sunny Honey Girl" as "undoubtedly Cliff's most blatantly commercial song for months" and that "it has all the ingredients for instant success – a catch tune, a good infectious beat, a title that's sung often enough to get inside your brain and a good arrangement by ex-Shadow Brian Bennett".

=== Track listing ===
7": Columbia / DB 8747

1. "Sunny Honey Girl" – 2:55
2. "Don't Move Away" – 3:05
3. "I Was Only Fooling Myself" – 3:03

=== Charts ===
Chart (1971)	Peak position
Belgium (Ultratop 50 Flanders)	30
Denmark (IFPI)	19
Malaysia (Radio Malaysia)	1
Netherlands (Dutch Top 40 Tipparade)	13
Netherlands (Single Tip)	4
New Zealand (Listener)	20
South Africa (Springbok Radio)	20
UK Singles (OCC)	19
