= I Ain't Got Time Anymore =

1970 single by Cliff Richard

- Cover of the single released in Germany

Single by Cliff Richard
- B-side: "Monday Comes Too Soon"
- Released: 21 August 1970
- Recorded: 12 March 1970
- Studio: EMI Studios, London
- Genre: Pop rock
- Length: 2:32
- Label: Columbia
- Songwriters: Mike Leander; Eddie Seago
- Producer: Norrie Paramor

Cliff Richard singles chronology
| "Goodbye Sam, Hello Samantha" (1970) | "I Ain't Got Time Anymore" (1970) | "Sunny Honey Girl" (1971) |

"I Ain't Got Time Anymore" is a song by the British singer Cliff Richard, released as a single in August 1970. It peaked at number 21 on the UK Singles Chart.

== Release ==
"I Ain't Got Time Anymore" was written by Mike Leander and Eddie Seago and features an accompaniment by the Mike Vickers Orchestra. It was released with the B-side "Monday Comes Too Soon", written by Hank Marvin and Jerry Lordan.

Reviewing for Record Mirror, Peter Jones described "I Ain't Got Time Anymore" as " a slow starter, through the verse with an inquiring sort of tone and then into a gentle-paced chorus, with voices tacked on... The performance is beyond criticism, as it usually is with Cliff. I guess his success is an ability to switch disc styles. Whatever it is this is destined for a very high chart placing".

== Track listing ==
7": Columbia / DB 8708

1. "I Ain't Got Time Anymore" – 2:32
2. "Monday Comes Too Soon" – 2:30

== Charts ==
| Chart (1970) | Peak position |
|---|---|
| Ireland (IRMA) | 14 |
| UK Singles (Official Charts) | 21 |

== The Glass Bottle version ==
"I Ain't Got Time Anymore"

Single by the Glass Bottle

from the album I Ain't Got Time Anymore
- B-side: "The First Time"
- Released: June 1971
- Genre: Soft rock
- Length: 2:27
- Label: Avco
- Songwriters: Mike Leander; Eddie Seago
- Producers: Bill Ramal; Dickie Goodman

The Glass Bottle singles chronology
| "Things" (1971) | "I Ain't Got Time Anymore" (1971) | "The Girl Who Loved Me When" (1971) |

In July 1971, American band The Glass Bottle released a cover of the song as a single. It peaked at number 36 on the Billboard Hot 100.

The Glass Bottle was originally formed as a ploy by advertising firm Benton & Bowles to promote glass bottles, as part of a publicity stunt in its clients' rivalry with aluminum and plastic container manufacturers. The original plan was for the group to record novelty songs with lyrics that invoked glass bottles, but producer and would-be songwriter Dickie Goodman abandoned that plan and positioned the group as a legitimate pop band recording conventional hit music, fulfilling the contract with Benton & Bowles by having them appear in pro-recycling public service announcements.

"I Ain't Got Time Anymore" was originally released as the B-side to a cover of the Bobby Darin song "Things". However, it was quickly released as the A-side with a different B-side, "The First Time".

=== Charts ===
| Chart (1971) | Peak position |
|---|---|
| Canada Top Singles (RPM) | 15 |
| US Billboard Hot 100 | 36 |
| US Cash Box Top 100 | 26 |
