= Beach Baby =

Single by The First Class

from the album Beach Baby
- B-side: "Both Sides of the Story"
- Released: 3 May 1974
- Genre: Bubblegum pop
- Length: 3:11 (single edit); 4:53 (album edit); 5:12 (album version)
- Label: UK Records
- Songwriters: John Carter and Gillian Shakespeare
- Producer: John Carter for Sunny Records Ltd.

The First Class singles chronology
"Beach Baby" (1974)	"Bobby Dazzler" (1974)

"Beach Baby" is a song by the British band The First Class. Written by John Carter and his wife, Gillian (Jill) Shakespeare, the song became the band's only substantial hit. The lyrics recount a broken love relationship between two high school students in 1950s Los Angeles. Released as a single in 1974, "Beach Baby" reached no. 13 on the UK Singles Chart and no. 4 on the US Billboard Hot 100. Critics praised the song, with Cash Box and Record World comparing it to the Beach Boys.

== Background ==
Carter and Shakespeare wrote "Beach Baby" in their home in East Sheen, South West London. Shortly afterward, Carter hired lead singer Tony Burrows and session singer Chas Mills to record it under the band name The First Class. Burrows attempts to sing the tune in an American accent, reflecting the song's California setting.

Toward the end of the song are two instrumental quotations, both on the French horn: the main theme from the last movement of Sibelius's Fifth Symphony, and the tune of the title line from one of Carter's previous compositions, "Let's Go to San Francisco", a 1967 hit for The Flower Pot Men. The estate of Jean Sibelius filed a lawsuit against the song's writers, for infringing on the copyright of the Sibelius piece. The case was settled out of court, with the Sibelius estate receiving half of the song's proceeds.

Because the running time was over five minutes, several AM radio stations edited "Beach Baby" by fading it out during the second instrumental bridge. The fade outs took on some importance, helping to avoid further legal implications.

In the 31 August 1974 edition of American Top 40, Casey Kasem claimed:

"Now on American Top 40, I have that song that was launched by a criminal act, an act that could have cost the owner of a British record company at least a stiff fine [sic]. He's also a recording artist, Jonathan King. He's known to Americans as the guy who hit back in 1965 with 'Everyone's Gone to the Moon', remember? Well, since then he's become a successful producer in England, and he started his own label a couple of years ago. Last year, during the United Kingdom's severe energy crisis, a songwriter came to Jonathan's house with a master tape of a new song that he'd just recorded, but he'd come on a bad day of the week. You see, it was a day when Britons were prohibited from using electricity because of the power shortage. But something told King to take a chance. He invited the artist to come in, and, in a room lit only by candles, keeping the volume turned way down, he listened to that tape, and he knew he'd bought a hit song. Here it is, up to #25 this week, 'Beach Baby' by First Class."

The 21 September 1974 edition of the program added the detail that the song was recorded in London on 24 December 1973.

An engineer who was involved in the recording session recalls: "The recording was made in February 1974 at Lansdowne Studios, Holland Park, London. Tony Burrows was singing, John Carter producing and Paul Holland engineering. At the time, I was a house assistant engineer and remember being very impressed with the high level of professionalism and ability of the visiting engineer Paul Holland, who I had never met before. I don't believe that he sat down at any time during the session! - If my memory serves me right, the recording was completed in one evening session."

Although the band went on to release two studio albums and a multitude of singles, they were unable to recreate the success of "Beach Baby".

== Reception ==
"Beach Baby" received positive reviews in American music trade media upon its release in 1974, with comparisons to American rock group The Beach Boys. Record World called First Class the "English answer to the Beach Boys with strings" and anticipated this song to be "a big summer novelty debut." Similarly, Cash Box called the song "reminiscent of the early Beach Boys" and praised the song's composition for a "perfect surfin' arrangement". Billboard named "Beach Baby" as one of the best tracks on the First Class' eponymous album.

Los Angeles Times music critic Robert Hilburn, in a 1996 review of a Tony Burrows compilation album, considered "Beach Baby" to be the "most interesting" track because of its "zesty Beach Boys spirit".

In 2002, Robin Carmody of British online magazine Freaky Trigger wrote that the song marked the end of the original wave of British bubblegum pop, indicating the transition into a period of pastiche "and paying tribute to the American pop of a decade or so before, rather than being gloriously unselfconscious and picking up on what was hot at that moment, always a sign that a genre has reached the end of line." He deemed it a "fantastically-produced slice of Californian fantasypop – orchestra, brass, lavish vocal harmonies, already a tribute song to a vanished era at the time." Further including it in a list of the genre's classics, he described it as "Britgum's dying fall: put the fade on repeat play and hear pop, for the first time, become pure period pastiche.

In 2023, Tim Sendra of Allmusic regarded "Beach Baby" as an "instantly catchy, warmly nostalgic Beach Boys tribute".

== Chart performance ==
=== Weekly singles charts ===
Chart (1974–1975)	Peak position
Australia (Kent Music Report)	11
Canada RPM Top Singles	1
Ireland (IRMA)	19
South Africa (Springbok)	8
UK	13
U.S. Billboard Hot 100	4
U.S. Billboard Adult Contemporary	38
U.S. Cash Box Top 100	3

=== Year-end charts ===
Chart (1974)	Rank
Canada	36
U.S. Billboard	94
U.S. Cash Box	53
Chart (1975)	Rank
Australia (Kent Music Report)	59

== Covers ==
- It was subsequently recorded in French by Sacha Distel under the title "Vite, Chérie, Vite".

== See also ==
- List of 1970s one-hit wonders in the United States
