= United We Stand (song) =

Single by Brotherhood of Man

from the album United We Stand
- B-side: "Say a Prayer"
- Released: 23 January 1969
- Genre: Bubblegum pop; pop rock
- Length: 2:52
- Label: Deram Records
- Songwriters: Tony Hiller; Peter Simons
- Producer: Tony Hiller

Brotherhood of Man singles chronology
"Love One Another" (1969)	"United We Stand" (1969)	"Where Are You Going to My Love" (1970)

"United We Stand" is a song written by Tony Hiller and Peter Simons (writer's pseudonym for group member Johnny Goodison). It was first released in 1970 by the Brotherhood of Man in their original, pre-Eurovision line-up, consisting of Goodison, Tony Burrows, Roger Greenaway, Sue Glover and Sunny Leslie. It became the band's first hit, peaking at #13 in the U.S., #9 in Canada, and #10 in the U.K. The song spent 15 weeks on the charts, and is ranked as the 64th biggest U.S. hit of 1970. It also reached #8 in Australia.

== Background ==
Reg Dwight, who would later become famous as Elton John, was an office boy at Mills Music, a Denmark Street music publishing house where Hiller worked. Hiller knew he could sing and had him record the original demo for "United We Stand."

The song was later included on an album of the same name and was followed by another hit "Where are You Going to My Love".

== Reception ==
The song has often been used to promote unity and has been used as a football chant and by LGBTQ+ rights movements.

Billboard gave the song a favourable review on 14 March 1970 calling it a "strong production" and (correctly) predicting it would become a top 20 hit on the Billboard Hot 100.

== Chart history ==
=== Weekly charts ===
Chart (1970)	Peak position
Australia KMR	8
Canada RPM Top Singles	9
Ireland (IRMA)	16
UK (OCC)	10
U.S. Billboard Hot 100	13
U.S. Billboard Adult Contemporary	15
U.S. Cash Box Top 100	13

=== Year-end charts ===
Chart (1970)	Rank
Australia	52
U.S. Billboard Hot 100	64
U.S. Cash Box	79

== Cover versions ==
It has been recorded by over 100 different artists, including:

- A sound-alike cover appeared on the 1970 album Top of the Pops, Volume 10.
- Edison Lighthouse on their 1971 album, Already.
- Elton John on his 1994 LP, Reg Dwight's Piano Goes Pop.
- Sonny and Cher on their 1971 album All I Ever Need Is You.
- Liliane Saint-Pierre covered the song in French as "Nous resterons unis (We will remain united)".
- In Italy, Wess and Dori Ghezzi reached the top ten chart covering the song in Italian.
- Mary Roos covered the song in Germany.
- Six recorded a version which appeared on their album in 2002.
- Phish closed out their three-night stand in 2015 at Dick's Sporting Goods Park with the song.
- On The Muppet Show, The Muppets covered the song with Lola Falana in her episode.

== Popular culture ==
- In 1977, it was used as the closing theme song of the US variety show The Brady Bunch Hour.
- The song plays during the final moments of the 2021 TV series Station Eleven.
