= United We Stand (Brotherhood of Man album) =

Studio album by The Brotherhood of Man
- Released: June 1970 (US); August 1970 (UK)
- Recorded: 1969–1970
- Genres: Pop, MOR, soul
- Length: 33:24
- Label: Deram
- Producer: Tony Hiller

The Brotherhood of Man chronology
United We Stand (1970)	We're the Brotherhood of Man (1972)

Professional ratings
Review scores
Source	Rating
Allmusic	4/5 stars

United We Stand is the debut album by The Brotherhood of Man. It was released in 1970 on Deram.

== Background ==
Songwriter and producer Tony Hiller formed The Brotherhood of Man in 1969 from a selection of session-singers and songwriters. Originally a five-member group (although they became a quartet soon after), they began recording and writing together with the resultant first single "Love One Another" being released late in the year. The single failed to chart anywhere, but early in 1970, the second single "United We Stand" became a major hit worldwide. Encouraged by this, the group, with Hiller as producer, began putting together an album. Along with a third single, the hit "Where are You Going to My Love", United We Stand was released. Despite the last two singles charting in the UK, the album met with little British success when it was released in August. In the US (released two months earlier), the album reached a peak of #168, spending eight weeks on the Billboard Hot 200.

The style of songs on this album was very much of its time, with an overall optimistic slant to the lyrics and sound – later reviewers commenting on its "hippy vibe". Many of the tracks from this album were later released on a compilation CD also titled United We Stand in 1998. In February 2008, the album with its original track listing order and cover was released on CD for the first time. Added to this however were 13 bonus tracks, giving it the feel of a compilation. Some of these bonus tracks were actually by the group's female members as the duo Sue and Sunny.

== Track listing ==
Side one

1. "Love Is a Good Foundation" (Ralph Murphy) – 2:48
2. "Say a Prayer" (Peter Simons, Tony Hiller) – 3:11
3. "A Little Bit of Heaven" (Simons, Hiller) – 2:35
4. "For the Rest of Our Lives" (Chris Arnold, David Martin, Geoff Morrow, John Goodison, Hiller) – 3:09
5. "Sing in the Sunshine" (Hiller, Goodison) – 2:07
6. "Where Are You Going to My Love" (Billy Day, Mike Leslie, Goodison, Hiller) – 3:20

Side two

1. "For Old Times Sake" (Tony Waddington, Wayne Bickerton) – 3:00
2. "Living in the Land of Love" (Tony Burrows, Goodison, Hiller) – 3:19
3. "Too Many Heartaches" (Simons, Hiller) – 3:22
4. "Love One Another" (Simons, Hiller) – 3:41
5. "United We Stand" (Simons, Hiller) – 2:52

2008 CD re-issue bonus tracks

1. "This Boy"
2. "You Can Depend on Me"
3. "Ain't That Tellin' You People"
4. "Didn't I Blow Your Mind"
5. "Reach out Your Hand"
6. "A Better Tomorrow"
7. "Freedom"
8. "Break Up"
9. "You and I"
10. "California Sunday Morning"
11. "Do Your Thing"
12. "I'm Gonna Make You Love Me"
13. "High on the Thought of You"

== Personnel ==
- Tony Burrows – vocals
- Sue Glover – vocals
- Sunny Leslie – vocals
- John Goodison – vocals
- Roger Greenaway – vocals
- Tony Hiller – producer
- Cy Payne – Musical Director
- Terry Johnson – Engineer
- Stephen Brown – Assistant engineer
- H. Ghia – Cover artwork
- Ira Howard, Tony Blackburn – Original sleeve notes
