= My Baby Loves Lovin' =

1970 single by White Plains

Single by White Plains

from the album White Plains
- B-side: "Show Me Your Hand"
- Released: 2 January 1970
- Recorded: 26 October 1969
- Genre: Bubblegum pop; pop rock
- Length: 2:56
- Label: Deram
- Songwriters: Roger Cook; Roger Greenaway
- Producers: Roger Cook; Roger Greenaway

White Plains singles chronology
"My Baby Loves Lovin'" (1970)	"I've Got You on My Mind" (1970)

"My Baby Loves Lovin'" was a song first released by the British pop group White Plains in 1970. It became a worldwide success and was the group's top-selling single. Written and produced by Roger Cook and Roger Greenaway, the song was recorded on 26 October 1969 and released on 2 January 1970 on Deram Records, a Decca imprint. It peaked at number 9 on the UK singles chart in early 1970 and reached number 13 on the US Billboard Hot 100 the week of 27 June 1970.

== Vocals ==
There is some debate over who sang lead vocals on the song. It was believed for many years that session singer Tony Burrows was the lead vocalist on the track; however, various sources have claimed that band member Ricky Wolff was the lead vocalist on the hit record. When the tune was released, an article appeared in which the band announced that the lead vocals were performed by Wolff, with Tony Burrows as a background voice. The liner notes of the group's compilation album The Deram Records Singles Collection stated: "Contrary to popular myth, we are assured that the lead vocals were performed by Ricky Wolff, with Tony Burrows doubling him on the chorus". But "due to Wolff's unavailability to promote the record, it would be singer-songwriter Roger Greenaway who appeared as the main lead singer on the promotional material and TV performances".

In an official letter, White Plains producer Roger Greenaway also confirmed that Ricky Wolff performed the lead vocals on "My Baby Loves Lovin'".

== Track listing ==
7": Deram / DM 280

1. "My Baby Loves Lovin'" – 2:56
2. "Show Me Your Hand" – 2:39

== Charts ==
=== Weekly charts ===
Chart (1970)	Peak position
UK Singles (Official Charts)	9
US Billboard Hot 100	13
US Cashbox Top 100	10
Canada Top Singles (RPM)	4
Denmark (IFPI)	7
Ireland (IRMA)	9
New Zealand (Listener)	11
Rhodesia (Lyons Maid)	14
South Africa (Springbok Radio)	8
Sweden (Kvällstoppen)	12
Australia (Go-Set)	16
Australia (Kent Music Report)	20
Belgium (Ultratop 50 Flanders)	13
Belgium (Ultratop 50 Wallonia)	47

=== Year-end charts ===
Chart (1970)	Rank
Canada Top Singles (RPM)	65
US Billboard Hot 100	62

== Personnel ==
- Ricky Wolff - lead vocals (died October 2023)
- Tony Burrows - backing vocals
- Pete Nelson - backing vocals (died 2005)
- Robin Shaw - backing vocals

== Cover versions ==
- Released in February 1970 was a rendition by the Joe Jeffrey Group. This version charted concurrently with the White Plains version and reached number 115 on the Billboard Bubbling Under Hot 100. It also reached number 23 on the Australian Go-Set Top 40 and number 11 on the retrospective Kent Music Report.
- Elton John recorded his own cover in 1970. This song has also been covered by Edison Lighthouse (1971 Bell Records, Japan), The Pipkins (1970), Sunny Leslie, Dickie Loader, Kurt Russell, Dr Victor, Nancy Boyd and Einstein's Sister.
