= The Flower Pot Men =

English pop group

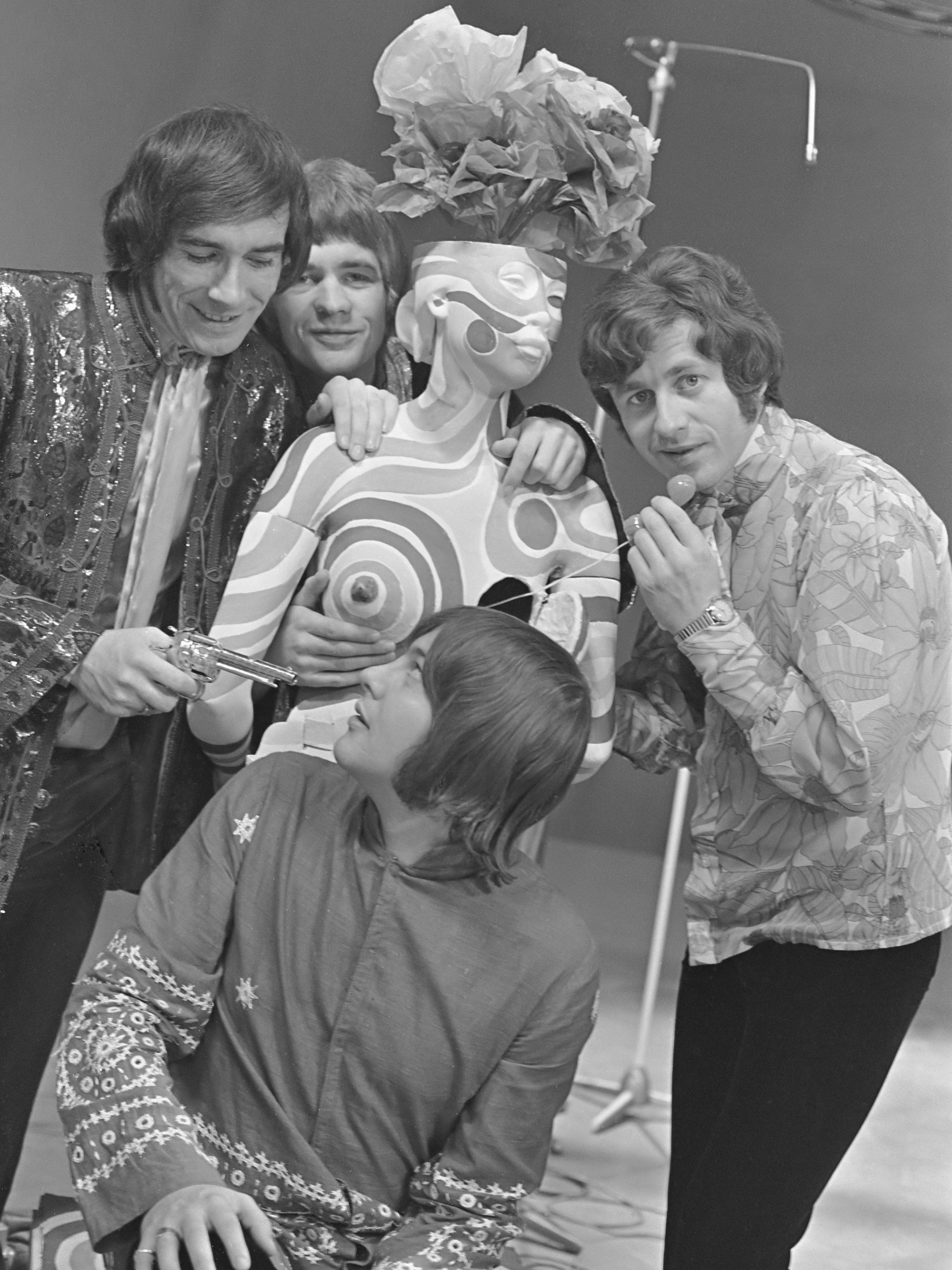
- The Flower Pot Men (1967) From left to right: Neil Landon, Pete Nelson, Robin Shaw (Shaw, bottom middle), and Tony Burrows

Background information
- Also known as: Flower Pot Men
- Origin: England
- Genres: Pop rock; psychedelic pop; sunshine pop
- Years active: 1967–1970
- Label: Deram
- Spinoffs: White Plains
- Past members: Personnel

The Flower Pot Men (sometimes spelled The Flowerpot Men) were an English pop group created in 1967 as a result of the single "Let's Go to San Francisco", recorded by session musicians, which became a major UK Top 20 and Continental Europe hit in the autumn of 1967. The group's sound was characterised by rich, three-part vocal harmonies.

== History ==
The Flower Pot Men were a studio recording construct created by John Carter and Ken Lewis, originally the main songwriters of The Ivy League. They notably were featured as backing vocalists for early Who albums and for the first recording of a song that Sagittarius covered, "My World Fell Down". Ken Lewis departed as a result of his lack of interest in touring, and Carter joined him soon after to create a musical songwriting duo.

=== "Let's Go to San Francisco" ===
"Let's Go to San Francisco" was written and recorded by John Carter and Ken Lewis, a songwriting team known as Carter & Lewis. The composition, psychedelic in nature, took vocal and instrumental inspiration from The Beach Boys. The name The Flower Pot Men was derived from the BBC children's show Flower Pot Men, with the obvious psychedelic era puns on flower power and "pot" (cannabis). In the US, they were commonly deemed The Flower Men on radio airplay to avoid the drug reference.

The duo licensed the recording to Deram Records, who had a hit but no group to promote it. Carter and Lewis, having no interest in going on the road to promote the record, created the group from a hand-picked collective of recording studio session musicians and vocalists. Led by vocalist Tony Burrows, Neil Landon, Pete Nelson, Robin Shaw, the band also included Billie Davis's backing band, and for a while (though not for recordings) later Deep Purple members Jon Lord, who replaced Billy Davidson on keyboards in January 1968, and Nick Simper on bass.

Carter and Lewis continued to write, record and produce most of the band's subsequent recordings over the next three years.

=== Other records ===
The follow-up to "Let's Go to San Francisco" was the similar-sounding "A Walk in the Sky", released in November 1967. It was not a hit in the UK, but reached No. 4 in the Netherlands and also proved popular in Germany. Carter and Lewis continued writing and recording new material, but Deram wanted another hit to rival the success of "Let's Go to San Francisco". When the third Carter-Lewis single "Man Without a Woman" / "You Can Never Be Wrong" failed to chart in April 1968, the label had the touring band record "In A Moment of Madness" by Roger Greenaway without the involvement of Carter and Lewis, which also failed to chart. As Mark Frumento wrote in the liner notes of the retrospective Flower Pot Men album, Listen to the Flowers Grow: "At this point Deram decided that the Flower Pot Men name was no longer commercial and the next single, "Piccolo Man" was released under the band name 'Friends' ... The final Flower Pot Men single was released in 1969, but this time the writing team Roger Cook and Roger Greenaway were behind the production."

The line-up of the Flower Pot Men had changed considerably by then. Lord and Simper left in summer 1968, Neil Landon left in December 1968 to become lead singer of Fat Mattress. Neil was then replaced by backing band member Ricky Wolff in January 1969. Wolff, Burrows, Shaw and Nelson stayed with Roger Greenaway and Roger Cook, added new musicians and changed their name to White Plains, who scored a hit with "My Baby Loves Lovin'" in 1970. The Flower Pot Men dissolved at that point.

=== Post 1970 ===
Burrows and Shaw later surfaced in another John Carter project, The First Class, whose sole Top 40 hit was "Beach Baby". A harmony phrase shortly before the fade out of this record referenced "Let's Go to San Francisco". Carter also recorded a track "Let's Go Back To San Francisco (Parts 1 and 2)", released as 'Beautiful People' in 1981. Later the song appeared on a First Class retrospective and ultimately appeared on a compilation album by the Flower Pot Men.

In 2000 Carter released a CD Peace Album / Past Imperfect that comprised two unreleased Flower Pot Men albums recorded between 1967 and 1969. Burrows still performs on the oldies circuit. Shaw is still on the road with White Plains.

In the liner notes of Listen to the Flowers Grow (RPM Retro 809) from April 2007, Mark Frumento mentioned that "sadly, Pete Nelson died a few years ago."

Tony Burrows worked with different bands including White Plains, Edison Lighthouse, Brotherhood of Man and the Pipkins and as a solo artist.

Robin Shaw would be the bass guitarist for Cliff Bennett and the Rebel Rousers from 1988 to 2002.

After a short stint in a band called Zenith in 1974, Pete Nelson retired from the music industry.

Lord and Simper's connection to this pop band was later lampooned in the fake rock documentary Spinal Tap, whose fictional first hit was called "(Listen to the) Flower People", a reference to "Let's Go to San Francisco".

From 2004 to 2006, Shaw was part of a reformed version of White Plains. A reunion tour took place in 2013, which featured Shaw and Burrows.

Pete Nelson (born 10 March 1943) died in Ealing, London on 23 October 2005, at the age of 62, after a short battle with cancer.

Neil Landon (born 26 July 1941) died in Hamburg, Germany on 26 March 2020, at the age of 78, also from cancer.

== Personnel ==
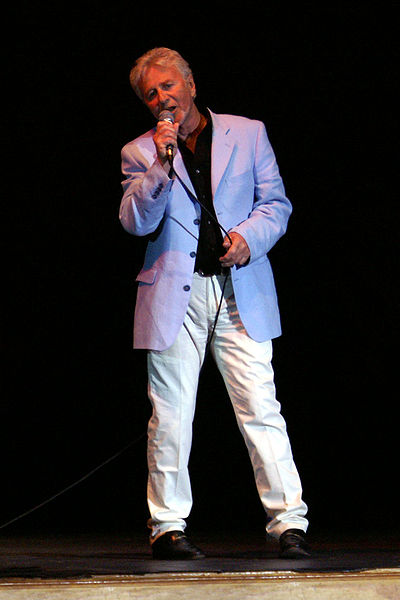
Tony Burrows in concert. Taken on 17 May 2008.

- Tony Burrows – vocals
- Neil Landon (born Patrick Cahill, 26 July 1941, Kirdford, Sussex – died 26 March 2020, Hamburg, Germany) – vocals
- Robin Shaw (born Robin George Scrimshaw, 6 October 1943, Hayes, Middlesex) – vocals
- Pete Nelson (born Peter William Lipscomb, 10 March 1943, Uxbridge, London – died 23 October 2005, Ealing, London) – vocals
- Ricky Wolff (born Richard Wolff, 8 July 1945, Pretoria, South Africa) - keyboards, sax, flute (from Autumn 1968), vocals (from January 1969)
- Ged Peck (born 19 October 1947, West Hendon, London) – guitar
- Carlo Little (born Carl O'Neil Little, 17 December 1938, Shepherd's Bush, London – died 6 August 2005, Cleadon, County Durham) – drums
- Robin Box (born 19 June 1944) - guitar
- Nick Simper – bass
- Jon Lord – organ
- Mick Stewart – lead guitar
- Tony 'Tex' Makins – bass
- Gordon Haskell – bass
- Billy Davidson – keyboards
- John Carroll – organ
- Tony Hall - sax
- Roger Hills (born 1948) - drums

== Sources ==
- Mark Frumento, liner notes of Listen to the Flowers Grow (RPM Retro 809), April 2007.
- Mark Frumento, liner notes John Carter – A Rose by any Other Name (Rev-ola REV 84), October 2004.
- Bob Stanley, liner notes The John Carter Anthology – Measure by Measure (RPM rpmd268), 2003.
