= The Ivy League (band) =

English vocal trio

- Origin: England
- Genres: Beat, rock, pop rock
- Years active: 1964–2017
- Label: Piccadilly
- Past members: Personnel

The Ivy League were an English vocal trio, formed in 1964, who enjoyed two top 10 hit singles on the UK Singles Chart in 1965. The group's sound was characterised by rich, three-part vocal harmonies.

== Career ==
The Ivy League was formed in August 1964 by three session singers with an extensive vocal range, John Carter, Ken Lewis (both previous members of Carter-Lewis and the Southerners) plus Perry Ford. They were first heard doing background vocals for The Who on their hit single "I Can't Explain" in November 1964 but after that, the Who's producers entrusted John Entwistle and Pete Townshend with the backing vocals. Their debut single, "What More Do You Want" generated little interest but the second release, "Funny How Love Can Be" made the UK chart's Top 10. Further hits followed, including "That's Why I'm Crying" and UK chart number 3 "Tossing and Turning". The original trio released just one album, 1965's This is the Ivy League – panned in the music press as disappointing, with its excessively wide spread of musical styles and material – before both Carter and Lewis left the group. Carter departed in January 1966, with Lewis leaving about one year later. The duo then set up a production company called Sunny Records.

Tony Burrows and Neil Landon replaced Carter and Lewis and the Ivy League released a couple of albums, Sounds of the Ivy League (1967) and Tomorrow is Another Day (1969). Several more singles followed, including the minor hits, "Willow Tree" and "My World Fell Down". A cover version of the latter song provided the U.S. band Sagittarius with a number 70 chart placing in the Billboard Hot 100 in 1967.

Success for the Ivy League in the United States was slight, only "Tossing and Turning" appearing in the Billboard charts, reaching number 83 on the Billboard Hot 100. Carter and Lewis next masterminded The Flower Pot Men, hitting number 4 in the UK with "Let's Go To San Francisco". Carter and Lewis then fulfilled the role of managers. Burrows and Landon left The Ivy League to join the touring version of The Flower Pot Men. Two further "front men" were with the band during this period (Robert Young and Mike Curtis), leaving Perry Ford to carry on with new personnel until he stopped using the name in 1975.

In the 1990s, a number of compilations were released, including Major League: the Collectors' Ivy League (1998).

The Ivy League continued to perform, although none of the three members of the band, Jon Brennan (vocals and bass guitar), David Buckley (vocals and drums) and Michael Brice (vocals and lead guitar), are from the original 1960s line-up. Robert Macleod joined in 1968-69 but had immigration problems similar to those that befell the Bee Gees and had to leave the country. Buckley joined the band in the late 1960s with Perry Ford still involved in the group. Brennan then later joined Buckley, and with Ford's blessing, kept the Ivy League going through the 1970s and beyond. Having worked with the Ivy League on several occasions throughout the 1960s and 1970s, Brice joined the band permanently in 1990 replacing Les Litwinenko-Jones who had previously played with Ian Kewley in Samson.

Following the conclusion of the Sensational 60's Experience tour during late 2016 and early 2017, The Ivy League performed a handful of their own shows in the UK. On 9 July 2017, The Ivy League performed their last show at the Pontins holiday resort in Pakefield. After decades of touring, Buckley, Brennan and Brice have now retired from the industry.

== Personnel ==
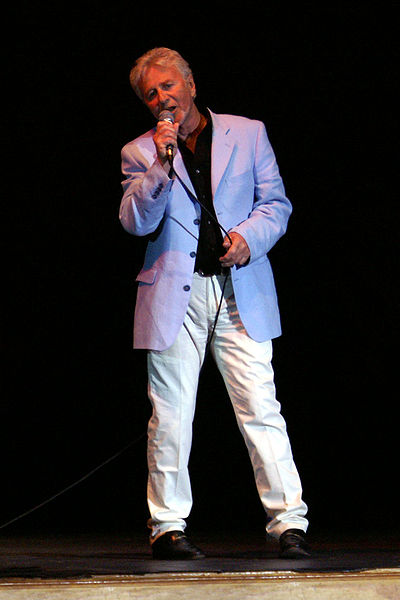
Tony Burrows in concert - taken on 17 May 2008

- John Carter – vocals
- Ken Lewis – vocals, guitar
- Perry Ford – vocals
- Colin Reeves - vocals
- Clem Cattini – drums
- Mick O'Nell – organ
- Dave Winter – bass
- Mickey Keene – lead guitar
- Bill Clarke – bass
- Tony Burrows – vocals
- Neil Landon – vocals, guitar
- Robert Young (born Robert Parkes, 1953, Stockport) – vocals
- David Lund – drums
- Nigel Menday - drums

== Discography ==
=== Albums ===
- This Is the Ivy League (1965)
- Tossing and Turning (1965; US album)
- Sounds of the Ivy League (1967)
- Tomorrow Is Another Day (1969)
- The Best Of (1988)
- The Best of the Ivy League (1991)
- Major League – The Collectors' Ivy League (1997)

=== Singles ===
Year	Single	Peak chart positions					
Year	Single	UK	AUS	IRE	NL	SA	US
1964	"What More Do You Want"	—	—	—	—	—	—
1965	"Funny How Love Can Be"	8	—	—	—	—	—
1965	"That's Why I'm Crying"	22	—	—	—	—	—
1965	"Tossing and Turning"	3	44	2	9	9	83
1965	"Our Love Is Slipping Away"	—	—	—	—	—	—
1966	"Running Round in Circles"	—	100	—	—	—	—
1966	"Willow Tree"	50	—	—	—	—	—
1966	"My World Fell Down"	—	—	—	—	—	—
1967	"Four and Twenty Hours"	—	—	—	—	—	—
1967	"Suddenly Things"	—	—	—	—	—	—
1967	"Thank You for Loving Me"	—	—	—	—	—	—
"—" denotes releases that did not chart or were not released
