= Sue and Sunny =

British vocal duo

Sue and Sunny were a British vocal duo of session singers operating in the 1960s, 1970s and 1980s. Although sisters, their stage names were Sue Glover and Sunny Leslie. For three years (1969–1972), they were members of British pop group Brotherhood of Man.

== Career ==
Born Yvonne Wheatman ('Sue') in 1949 and Heather Wheatman ('Sunny') in 1951 in Madras, India, they made their recording debut together in 1963 under the name The Myrtelles, with their cover version of Lesley Gore's "Just Let Me Cry" on the independent Oriole record label. The single was not commercially successful. The girls then released two singles under the name of Sue and Sunshine before settling on the name Sue and Sunny. Whilst recording with songwriter and producer Kenny Lynch the girls changed their name to The Stockingtops at his request, but decided it was not for them and reverted to Sue and Sunny. In 1965, they sang backing vocals on Alex Harvey's single, "Agent OO Soul" / "Go Away Baby" (Fontana – TF 610), produced by Chris Blackwell of Island Records.

In 1966, when Sunny (the younger of the pair) was 15, the two turned professional doing the cabaret circuit. After three years they decided that their audiences were too old for them, and went to Germany to play the airbase circuit, where, after releasing two German singles, they still felt out of place and returned to London.

Whilst in London they were asked to do a session as backing singers for Lesley Duncan. The session went well and the duo found themselves in demand, recording with, amongst many others, The Ace Kefford Stand, Dusty Springfield, Python Lee Jackson, Elton John, Cerrone, Love Affair, Lulu, Mott the Hoople, Peter Wyngarde, Amazing Blondel (Musgrave Street 1974), T. Rex, Tom Jones, David Bowie, Spooky Tooth (Spooky Two 1969), and Joe Cocker. It was the Cocker sessions, and in particular "With a Little Help from My Friends", where Sunny sang with Madeline Bell and Rosetta Hightower, that propelled the girls into the limelight. When "With A Little Help from My Friends" reached number one in the UK Singles Chart they found themselves accompanying Cocker on several television programmes including Top of the Pops. They worked with artists as diverse as Frank Zappa, Giorgio Moroder, and Brotherhood of Man, with whom they charted in 1970 with the hit single, "United We Stand". In March 1972, they just missed the UK top 30 with the single "Third Finger, Left Hand", released under the name The Pearls, a group name that was more successful with the personnel of Lyn Cornell and Ann Simmons.

Sue and Sunny themselves are a unsure of how many records they have released. In a 1974 interview with Disc, Sunny was quoted as saying "Sue and I found ourselves recording on our own and we had a couple of singles put out. But nothing really happened for us". They appear to have recorded around a dozen singles, but to confuse things further they also recorded under the names Sue & Sunshine, The Stockingtops, and as part of The Nirvana Orchestra. They also recorded an album for CBS which was also released, with a different cover, on the CBS subsidiary Reflection.

Sunny had a hit record with "Doctor's Orders" in 1974, and in 1976 Sue, now known as 'Sue Glover' recorded a solo album for DJM, entitled Solo. On three occasions, Sue and Sunny have sung backing vocals at the Eurovision Song Contest. In 1969, they accompanied Lulu to victory in Madrid, performing "Boom Bang-a-Bang". They returned to support Joy Fleming in Stockholm, in 1975, joining Madeline Bell to back up the German entry "Ein Lied kann eine Brücke sein", which placed seventeenth. In 1981, Sue resurfaced with an entry in the UK Song for Europe competition fronting the group 'Unity' with the song "For Only A Day", which finished in last place.

Sue and Sunny joined forces again to sing backing vocals for Vikki Watson's UK entry "Love Is..." in Gothenburg at the 1985 Eurovision final. This song was placed fourth.

The sisters toured regularly with orchestra leader James Last during much of the 1970s. They also were part of the Birds of Paris, a group of backing singers that worked mainly with disco producer Alec R. Costandinos and included Madeline Bell, Joanne Stone, Kay Garner, Vicki Brown and Katie Kissoon. Sue, Sunny and Bell contributed backing vocals for three albums by Donna Summer during the later part of the decade.

In 1979, Sue Glover appeared in the debut TV play from Victoria Wood, Talent, playing the part of club singer 'Cathy Christmas'.

== See also ==
- Brotherhood of Man
