= I Can't Explain =

Original song written and composed by Pete Townshend

Single by the Who
- B-side: "Bald Headed Woman"
- Released: 19 December 1964
- Recorded: Early November 1964
- Studio: Pye, London
- Genre: Power pop; garage rock
- Length: 2:04
- Label: Brunswick (UK); Decca (US)
- Songwriter: Pete Townshend
- Producer: Shel Talmy

The Who singles chronology
"Zoot Suit" (1964)	"I Can't Explain" (1964)	"Anyway, Anyhow, Anywhere" (1965)

Music video
- "I Can't Explain" on YouTube

"I Can't Explain" is a song by the English rock band the Who, written by Pete Townshend and produced by Shel Talmy. It was released as a single in the United States on 19 December 1964 by Decca and on 15 January 1965 in the United Kingdom by Brunswick. It was the band's second single release and first under the Who name.

The song has been covered by other artists, including David Bowie.

== Background ==
"I Can't Explain" was the A-side of the group's first single as the Who; its predecessor, "Zoot Suit"/"I'm the Face", was released under the name the High Numbers. In the album's liner notes, Townshend noted the song's similarity to the contemporaneous hit "All Day and All of the Night" by the Kinks: "It can't be beat for straightforward Kink copying. There is little to say about how I wrote this. It came out of the top of my head when I was 18 and a half". In a 1994 issue of Q magazine, Roger Daltrey echoed Townshend's comments regarding the Kinks' influence:

We already knew Pete could write songs, but it never seemed a necessity in those days to have your own stuff because there was this wealth of untapped music that we could get hold of from America. But then bands like the Kinks started to make it, and they were probably the biggest influence on us – they were certainly a huge influence on Pete, and he wrote 'I Can't Explain', not as a direct copy, but certainly it's very derivative of Kinks music.

In a May 1974 interview with Creem, Jimmy Page recalled playing rhythm guitar on the song as a session guitarist. This was confirmed by Townshend and producer Shel Talmy. According to those working on the recordings, however, Page's contribution did not make the final cut. "I was on 'I Can't Explain', just playing rhythm guitar in the background," he clarified in 2004. But the main riff, he confirmed, "was all Pete… He was roaring, man." Page also played on the B-side, "Bald Headed Woman". However, in Daltrey's 2018 autobiography, Thanks a Lot Mr. Kibblewhite: My Story (pages 94 and 95), he gives his version of the recording session and states that Page was on lead guitar. Additionally, in an interview with Daltrey on The Howard Stern Show in 2013, Daltrey said, regarding Page, "He played lead guitar; he played the solo."

The Who have used "I Can't Explain" throughout many of their live performances, often as the opener. It remains a staple today.

In a 2015 interview with Rolling Stone, Townshend referred to "I Can't Explain" as "a song, written by some 18-year-old kid, about the fact that he can't tell his girlfriend he loves her because he's taken too many Dexedrine tablets." In his autobiography Who I Am, Townshend says he came up with the song after being told by managers Kit Lambert and Chris Stamp to write original tunes for his up-and-coming band. He locked himself up in his bedroom listening to Bob Dylan, Charles Mingus, John Lee Hooker and Booker T. & the M.G.'s, and tried to summarise the feelings caused by the music, with the idea that came up the most being "I can't explain". Thus came the first verse, a meta approach where the lyrics are about songwriting itself. After being introduced to producer Shel Talmy, Townshend listened to "You Really Got Me" trying to make the rest of "I Can't Explain" a love song similar to the Kinks, hoping to please Talmy.

== Critical reception ==
In 2012, Paste ranked the song number ten on their list of the 20 greatest songs by the Who, and in 2022, Rolling Stone ranked the song number seven on their list of the 50 greatest songs by the Who. The song is ranked No. 9 on Pitchfork Media's list of the "200 Greatest Songs of the 1960s", No. 59 on Spin's list of the "100 Greatest Singles of All Time", and No. 380 on Rolling Stone's list of the "500 Greatest Songs of All Time" in 2010.

There was a misprinted label re-released in 1968 on the second colour band series label entitled "Can't Explain" but it was soon withdrawn and released with the correct title of the song as released on the first 1964 release, and other previous and future label releases.

== Chart performance ==
On the UK Singles Chart, "I Can't Explain" first appeared on 20 February 1965 at No. 45, and then reached its highest position on 17 April 1965 at No. 8. The song left the charts on 15 May at No. 29, having spent a total of 13 weeks there. The single was much less successful on the Billboard Hot 100, reaching only No. 93.

== Charts ==
Chart (1965)	Peak position
Australia (Kent Music Report)	87
Belgium (Ultratop 50 Flanders)	41
France (SNEP)	14
UK Singles (OCC)	8
US Billboard Hot 100	93
US Cash Box Top 100	57

== Personnel ==
The Who

- Roger Daltrey – lead vocals, tambourine
- Pete Townshend – lead 12-string guitar, backing vocals
- John Entwistle – bass, backing vocals
- Keith Moon – drums, backing vocals

Additional personnel

- Jimmy Page – rhythm guitar
- The Ivy League – backing vocals, handclaps
- Perry Ford – piano

== Cover versions ==
=== Scorpions version ===
"I Can't Explain"

Single by Scorpions

from the album Best of Rockers 'n' Ballads
- B-side: "Lovedrive"
- Released: October 1989
- Genre: Glam metal
- Length: 3:22
- Label: Polydor
- Songwriter: Pete Townshend
- Producer: Bruce Fairbairn

Scorpions singles chronology
"Passion Rules the Game" (1989)	"I Can't Explain" (1989)	"Is There Anybody There? (Long Version)" (1989)

Scorpions recorded their version of "I Can't Explain" for their 1989 compilation album Best of Rockers 'n' Ballads and the various artist compilation Stairway to Heaven/Highway to Hell, the latter album featuring bands that performed at the Moscow Music Peace Festival, an anti-drug and alcohol event, highlighting the related deaths of various famous musicians, such as the Who's Keith Moon, who died of a drug overdose.

The Scorpions version was released as single via Polydor Records, and reached No. 5 on the Mainstream Rock Tracks chart. They performed the song live during their 'Crazy World Tour'.

=== Weekly charts ===
Chart (1989)	Peak position
Finland (Suomen virallinen lista)	17
US Mainstream Rock (Billboard)	5

=== David Bowie version ===
David Bowie recorded a version of the song for his seventh studio album Pin Ups in 1973, along with another Who song, "Anyway, Anyhow, Anywhere".

=== The Sweet version ===
The Sweet – BBC session, 1971.
