= Tony Burrows =

English pop singer (born 1942)

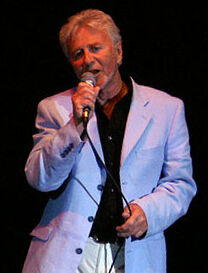
- Burrows performing in 2008

Background information
- Born: Anthony Burrows; 14 April 1942 (age 84); Exeter, Devon, England
- Genre: Pop
- Occupations: Singer; songwriter
- Years active: 1960s–present
- Award: BASCA Gold Badge Award (2011)

Anthony Burrows (born 14 April 1942) is an English pop singer and recording artist. As a prolific session musician, Burrows was involved in several transatlantic hit singles throughout the late 1960s and early 1970s, most of which were one-hit wonders, including "Love Grows (Where My Rosemary Goes)" by Edison Lighthouse, "United We Stand" by Brotherhood of Man, "My Baby Loves Lovin'" by White Plains, "Gimme Dat Ding" by the Pipkins and "Beach Baby" by the First Class.

During 1970, four singles by four different acts with whom he performed all charted at or near the top of the UK Singles Chart and additionally reached the top 20 in the United States, while a fifth single under his own name ("Melanie Makes Me Smile") reached the lower ends of the top 100 in the United States and Canada.

== Early life and career ==
Burrows was born in Exeter, Devon, England.

In the early 1960s, he was a member of the Kestrels, a vocal harmony group which also included the future songwriting team Roger Greenaway and Roger Cook. Burrows recorded his debut album in 1965 under the pseudonym Tony Bond. Subsequently, he joined the Ivy League in 1966 after the departure of John Carter.

== Bands ==
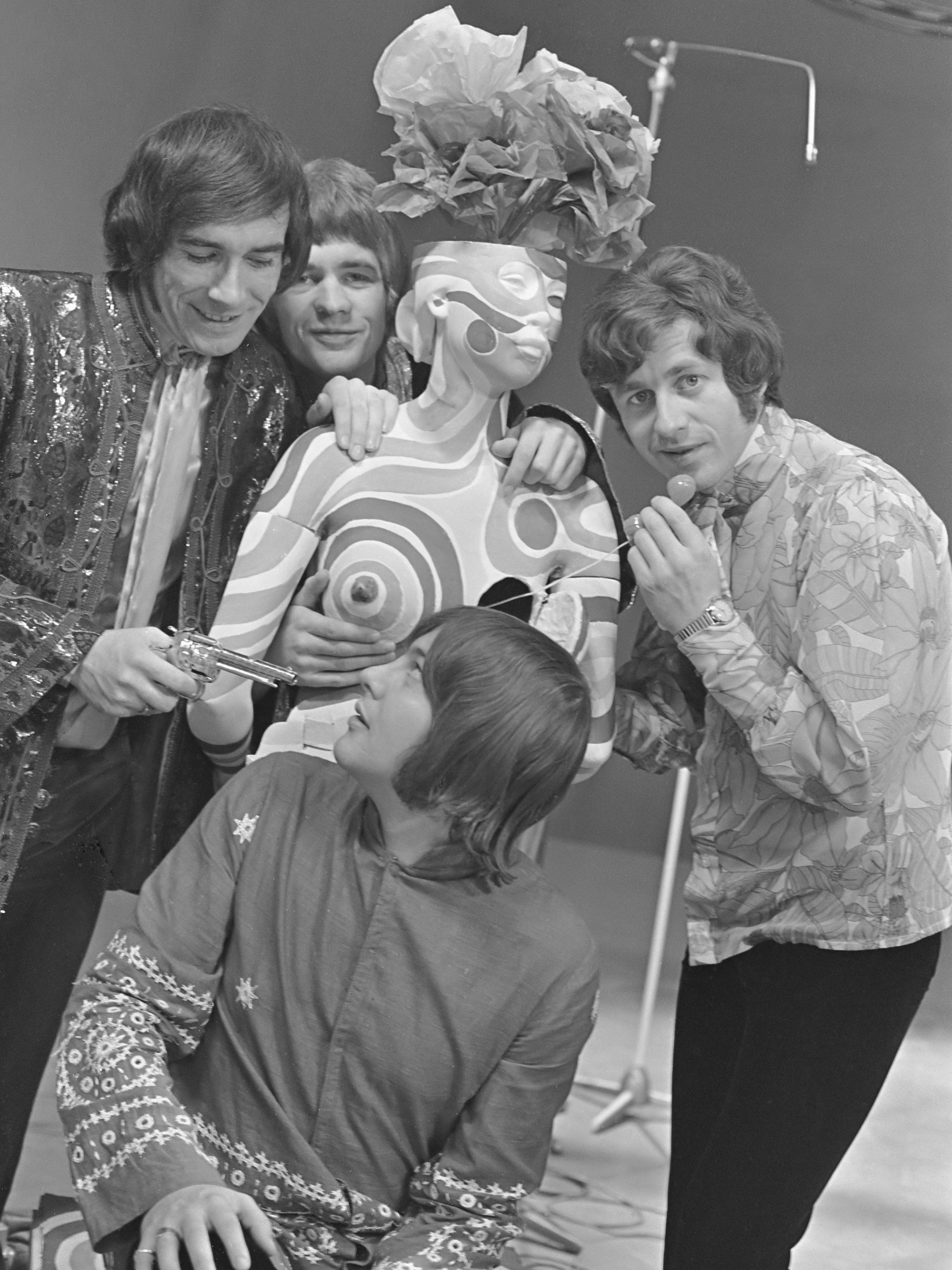
Burrows (standing at right) and the Flower Pot Men in 1967

Burrows was still with the Ivy League when they metamorphosed into the Flower Pot Men. The Flower Pot Men had only one hit, "Let's Go to San Francisco", which reached No. 4 on the UK Singles Chart in the autumn of 1967.

However, Burrows had no involvement with the single, which was created and recorded in the studio by the song's writers and producers. He did feature on a few later Flower Pot Men singles which were not hits. Two founding members of Deep Purple, Jon Lord and Nick Simper, were also part of this early band for live shows.

Later, Burrows sang on several other one-hit wonder songs under different group names, Edison Lighthouse's "Love Grows (Where My Rosemary Goes)" (January 1970); the Brotherhood of Man's "United We Stand"; and the Pipkins' novelty song "Gimme Dat Ding" (April 1970). He also recorded with White Plains on "My Baby Loves Lovin'," in which he shared vocals with Ricky Wolff. These songs were all recorded within nine months of each other, but were all released around the same time in early 1970. His other one-hit wonder group was the First Class's "Beach Baby" (July 1974). The Brotherhood of Man would have an additional minor and regional hit with Burrows as singer, 1972's "Reach Out Your Hand", before its founder Tony Hiller created an entirely new Brotherhood of Man with an entirely different lineup.

In 2025, Mitch Michaels wrote that Burrows was the first (and still the only) recording artist to appear on BBC Television's Top of the Pops fronting three different group acts appearing almost sequentially in a single broadcast show: Edison Lighthouse (the No. 1 British-charted hit that week), White Plains, and Brotherhood of Man. However, Top of the Pops records show that this did not happen; he had appeared with those three groups within the span of a month, and two on the same show one time—Edison Lighthouse and the Brotherhood of Man—on 29 January 1970 episode of Top of the Pops, but never appeared with three bands on a single show. The recordings of his appearances on 29 January, 5 February (with Edison Lighthouse) and 26 February 1970 (with White Plains) are all still in existence.

== Solo ==
In April 1970, in the midst of his session groups' success, he released a single under his own name, "Melanie Makes Me Smile", which reached No. 87 on the Billboard Hot 100. His subsequent solo singles failed to chart.

Burrows has also contributed background vocals as a session singer to many other songs, claiming to have sung on 100 top 20 hits in the 1970s. He has recorded as a session harmony singer with Elton John on the songs "Levon" and "Tiny Dancer", with Cliff Richard, John Cale, and James Last.

== Awards ==
In 2011, Burrows was awarded the BASCA Gold Badge Award in recognition of his contribution to music.

== Discography ==
=== One-hit wonder singles ===
- 1970: "My Baby Loves Lovin'" (White Plains)
- 1970: "Love Grows (Where My Rosemary Goes)" (Edison Lighthouse)
- 1970: "United We Stand" (Brotherhood of Man)
- 1970: "Gimme Dat Ding" (the Pipkins)
- 1974: "Beach Baby" (the First Class)

=== Solo singles ===
- 1970: "Melanie Makes Me Smile" / "I'll Get Along Somehow Girl" (Bell 1103)
- 1970: "I've Still Got My Heart, Jo" / "Every Little Move She Makes" (Bell 1124)
- 1971: "The Humming Song" / "Recollections" (Bell 1140)
- 1971: "I'll Always Come Up Smiling" / "Back Home" (Bell 1172)
- 1971: "Hand Me Down Man" / "Country Boy" (Bell 1190)
- 1971: "In the Bad Bad Old Days (Before You Loved Me)" / "In the Bad Bad Old Days" (Bell US 45-116, promo)
- 1972: "Rhythm of the Rain" / "Home Lovin' Man" (Bell 1235)
- 1973: "Take Away the Feeling" / "Lazy Weekend" (Ammo 103)
- 1974: "Have You Had a Little Happiness Lately" / "Can't Live With You, Can't Live Without You" (Ammo 111)
- 1975: "Run Joey Run" / "Girl I Used To Know" (RAK 216)
- 1976: "Never Gonna Fall in Love Again" / "Changing" (as Magic featuring Tony Burrows) (Bus Stop Records 1036)
- 1976: "Oh My Jo" / "Girl You've Got Me Going" (Bus Stop 1039)
- 1976: "When My Little Girl Is Smiling" / "What Ya Gonna Do About Him" (DJM 10718)
- 1984: "Three Chord Trick" / "Wake Up America" (as Heart to Heart with Stephanie de Sykes) (EMI 5461)

=== With Edison Lighthouse ===
==== Singles ====
Year	Title	Certifications
1970	"Love Grows (Where My Rosemary Goes)"	BPI: Silver
1970	"She Works in a Woman's Way"	

=== With Brotherhood of Man ===
==== Albums ====
Title	Album details
United We Stand	Released: August 1970; Label: Deram

==== Singles ====
Year	Title
1969	"Love One Another"
1970	"United We Stand"
1970	"Where are You Going to My Love"
1970	"This Boy"

=== With White Plains ===
Title	Album details
White Plains	Released: August 1970; Label: Deram

=== With the Pipkins ===
==== Albums ====
Year	Title
1970	Gimme Dat Ding

==== Singles ====
Title	Year
"Gimme Dat Ding"	1970
"Yakety Yak"	1970
"Are You Cooking, Goose?"	1970
"My Baby Loves Lovin'"	1970
"Sunny Honey Girl"	1970
"Hole in the Middle"	1970

=== With the First Class ===
==== Albums ====
Title	Year
The First Class	1974

==== Singles ====
Year	Single
1974	"Beach Baby"
1974	"Bobby Dazzler"
1974	"Dreams are Ten a Penny"
1975	"What Became of Me"
1975	"Funny How Love Can Be"
1975	"Life Is Whatever You Want It To Be"
1975	"I Was a Star"
1976	"Beach Baby (Re-Release)"
1976	"Child's Play"
1976	"Ain't No Love"
1977	"Too Many Golden Oldies"
1978	"Broken Toy"
1980	"Beach Baby (re-release)"
1982	"Beach Baby (re-release)"
1983	"Gimme Little Sign"

== See also ==
- List of performers on Top of the Pops
