= White Plains (band) =

British pop music group

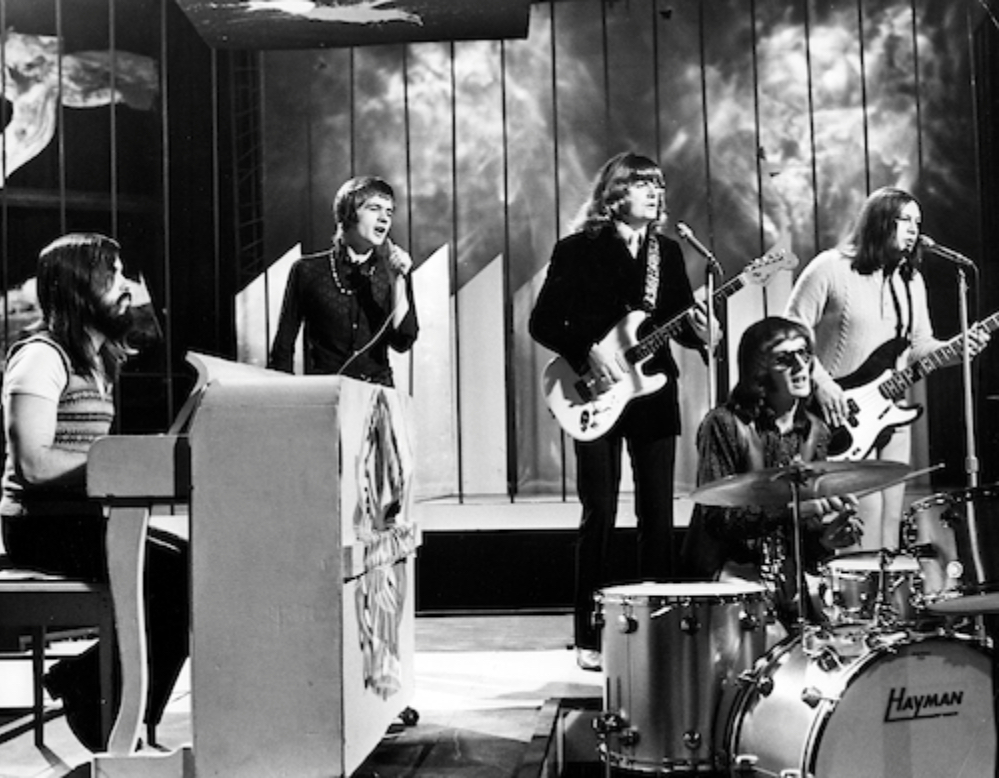
- White Plains during a studio performance of "Julie Do Ya Love Me?" on Top of the Pops on 19 November 1970. From L-R: Ricky Wolff (keyboard), Pete Nelson (vocals), Robin Box (guitar), Roger Hills (drums), Robin Shaw (bass)

Background information
- Also known as: The White Plains
- Origin: England
- Years active: 1969–1976; 1978; 2004–2006; 2013
- Spinoff of: The Flower Pot Men
- Past members: Personnel

White Plains were a British pop music group that recorded and performed from 1969 to 1976. The spinoff of the one-hit-wonder group The Flower Pot Men, they had an ever-changing line-up of musicians and five UK hit singles, all on the Deram Records label, in the early 1970s.

White Plains' first hit came in 1970 with "My Baby Loves Lovin'". Their later successful songs include "I've Got You on My Mind", "Lovin' You Baby", "Julie, Do Ya Love Me", "When You Are a King" and "Step Into a Dream". After "When You Are A King" peaked at number four in Northern Ireland, the group would not release a chart-worthy song for another two years, until they released "Step Into a Dream".

White Plains disbanded in 1976, but it reformed on three occasions: for a brief period in 1978, again for a two-year run from 2004 to 2006, and finally for a summer tour in 2013. White Plains is also known as one of the groups Tony Burrows recorded a series of one-hit wonder songs with.

== History ==
=== 1969–1970: Transition from The Flower Pot Men to White Plains ===
White Plains evolved from the late 1960s pop/psychedelic band the Flower Pot Men, composed of Tony Burrows, Pete Nelson, and Robin Shaw together with Neil Landon. The Flower Pot Men was initially a 1967 studio project led by John Carter.

In early 1969, Roger Greenaway and Roger Cook, in place of John Carter, became the group's new producers. The last single of the Flower Pot Men for Deram Records was "In A Moment Of Madness", composed by Greenaway and Cook, with Pete Nelson on lead vocals. It was an attempt at a hit single in the style of the then-popular Love Affair. The single did not chart, and for the next single, the band changed their name to White Plains. The band's songs were mainly produced and written by Greenaway and Cook. Neil Landon left the band and went to Fat Mattress. Ricky Wolff, who was originally a backing band member, replaced Landon and became a new main vocalist.

=== 1970: My Baby Loves Lovin' fame ===
White Plains released several hit songs, starting off with 1970's "My Baby Loves Lovin'" (No. 9 in the UK, No. 13 on the US charts and No. 4 in Canada). The group's top-selling song "My Baby Loves Lovin'" was written and produced by Roger Greenaway and Roger Cook. It was recorded on 26 October 1969, and released on 2 January 1970 on the Decca Records imprint, Deram Records. Dick Rowe, head of A&R at Decca, decided to release the single "My Baby Loves Lovin'" under a new band name, White Plains. It was then that The Flower Pot Men became White Plains. During early 1970, Ricky Wolff was unable to attend concerts or television appearances, meaning Roger Greenaway would usually step in as lead singer. Of the group's many appearances on Top of the Pops, only one, a performance of My Baby Loves Lovin' on 26 February 1970, is known to have survived the BBC's wiping process. In this performance, and their first appearance on the show on 12 February 1970, Roger Greenaway can be seen in Ricky Wolff's place as lead singer.

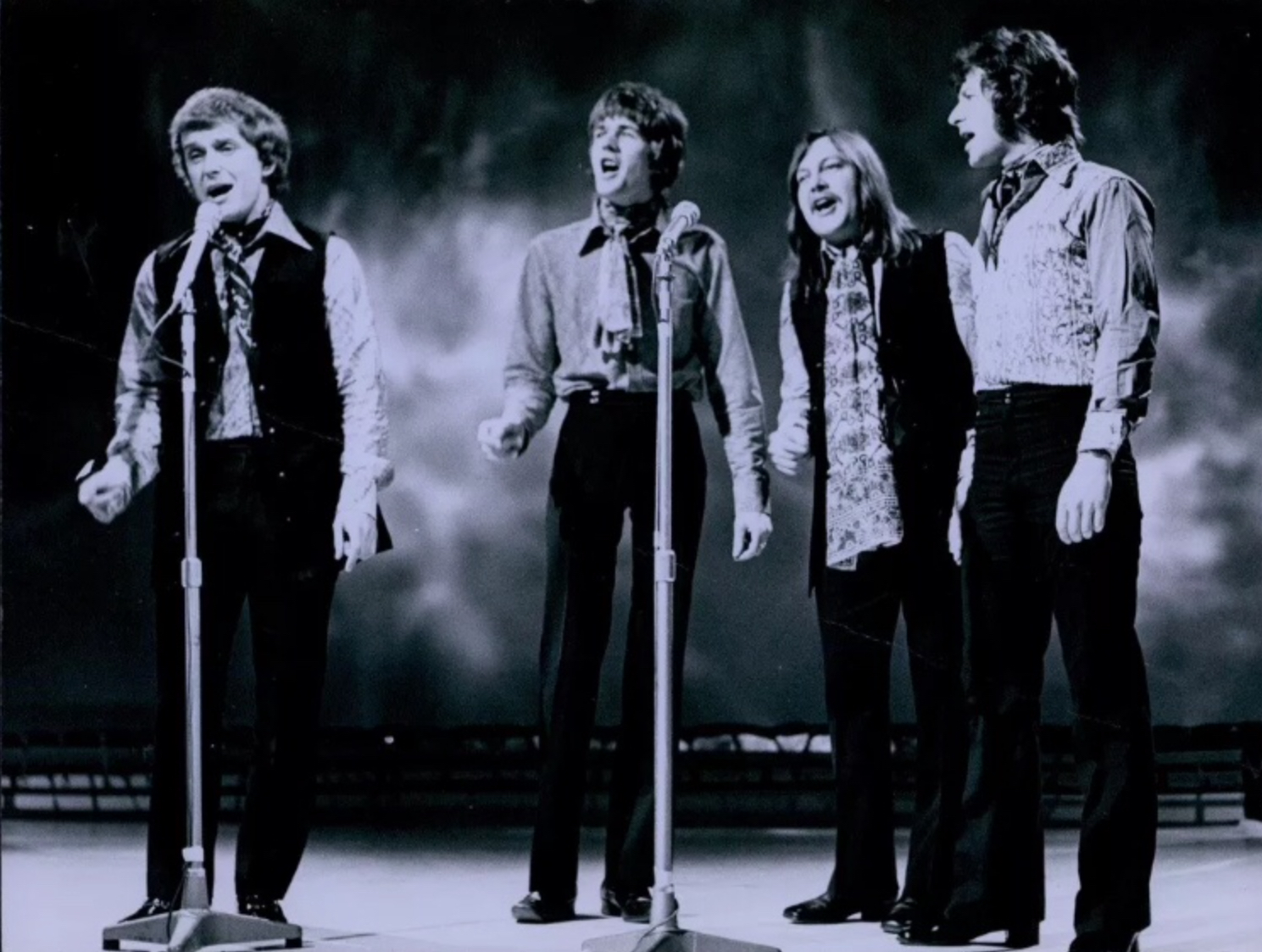
White Plains performing My Baby Loves Lovin’ on 12 February 1970. From left to right: Roger Greenaway, Pete Nelson, Robin Shaw, Tony Burrows. Due to Ricky Wolff being unavailable to attend the taping of the show, Roger Greenaway stepped in as lead singer.

==== "My Baby Loves Lovin'" vocals ====
When the song was released, the band said in an article that Tony Burrows did not sing lead on the single. The lead vocals on the track were in fact performed by Wolff, with Burrows as a background singer. Despite this, for many years Tony Burrows was widely credited by popular myth as lead singer on the track. However, various sources have said that band member Ricky Wolff was actually the lead vocalist on the hit record. According to the liner notes of the group's compilation album The Deram Records Singles Collection: "Contrary to popular myth, we are assured that the lead vocals were performed by Ricky Wolff, with Tony Burrows doubling him on the chorus".

White Plains producer Roger Greenaway has also confirmed Ricky Wolff was the lead vocalist on the recording of "My Baby Loves Lovin'", in an official letter, written and signed by him.

A promotional film of "My Baby Loves Lovin'" features bassist Robin Shaw as lead singer, miming over Ricky Wolff's vocals.

=== 1970–1973: New personnel changes and other hits ===
White Plains' second single, "I've Got You on My Mind", which featured Pete Nelson on lead vocals, was a UK hit, reaching number 17. "Lovin' You Baby" featuring Ricky Wolff on lead vocals reached number 35 in Canada in mid to late 1970. "Julie Do Ya Love Me" featuring Pete Nelson on lead vocals reached number 8 on the UK singles charts.

In mid 1970, original backing band members Roger Hills and Robin Box were added to the line-up. This new personnel of Wolff, Nelson, Box, Shaw, and Hills would become their most recognisable line-up, as well as the line-up that, following Wolff's departure in mid 1971, included newcomer Ron Reynolds on organ and keyboard. From the spring to the autumn of 1970, Scottish musician Brian Johnston (born 3 March 1945, Bathgate, Scotland) (not to be confused with the AC/DC singer), was a keyboardist for the group.

The White Plains line-up of Wolff, Nelson, Box, Shaw, Hills, and Johnston performed "My Baby Loves Lovin'" at the NME Poll Winners concert on 3 May 1970.

One of their next big charting songs was 1971's "When You Are a King" featuring Pete Nelson on lead vocals (number 13 on the UK Singles Chart) that was translated to Hebrew and covered by the Israeli singer, Shlomo Artzi. When You Are A King has been covered by a large numbers of acts in the following years.

=== 1973–1976: Step into a Dream and disbandment ===
The 1973 hit "Step into a Dream" was used in the British television commercials for Butlins' holiday camps. Featuring Pete Nelson on lead vocals. "Step into a Dream" peaked at number 21 in the United Kingdom, and was a top 10 in Ireland, landing at number 9. Their sudden burst into the limelight again gave the group new appearances on television, including Top of the Pops, their first appearance on the show in nearly two years. In late 1973, Shaw left the group and was subsequently replaced by Edison Lighthouse member David Kerr-Clemenson.

With a line-up of Pete Nelson (vocals), Ron Reynolds (keyboard), Robin Box (guitar), Tex Marsh (percussions), Dave Fulford (guitar) and Tony Sullivan (bass), the band temporarily disbanded in late 1974. In 1976, the band name was loaned out and another single called "Summer Nights" was released. The new lineup included two former members of the band Angel (Mick Tucker and Andy Scott of Sweet's project), vocalist Brian Johnson (who went on to front Vanity Fare in the '80s) and drummer Steve Rickard.

=== Reunions ===
In 1978, Pete Nelson and Robin Box briefly reformed the group to record two more singles for PVK records.

A reformed version containing Roger Hills, Robin Shaw and Box was active from 2004 to 2006. In 2013, another reunion for touring took place with Tony Burrows, Robin Shaw, and Roger Hills.

Former members later lives

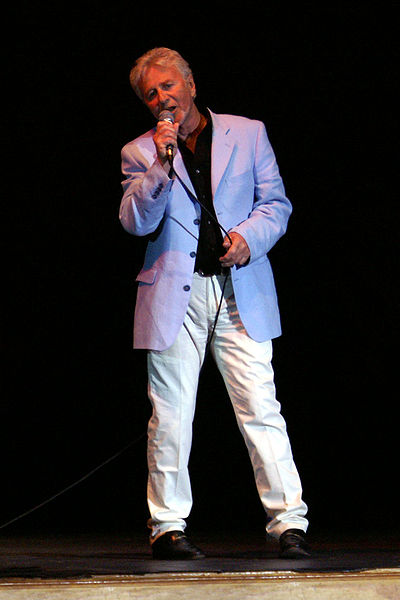
Tony Burrows in concert. Taken on 17 May 2008.

Burrows and Shaw met again in 1974 in First Class, another John Carter project that scored worldwide with their single, "Beach Baby". As of 2023, Burrows remains active as a solo artist.

David Kerr-Clemenson joined rock group Fast Buck in 1975, and toured with them for another thirty-nine years.

Ricky Wolff later joined Harley Quinne and lent his lead vocals on their UK Top 20 hit single, "New Orleans". Harley Quinne was a UK act created by British songwriting and production team, Roger Cook and Roger Greenaway, as a promotional vehicle for a 1972 song entitled "New Orleans", a cover of the Gary 'U.S.' Bonds original. It was originally recorded by a phalanx of session players with Ricky Wolff as the session singer. Wolff worked as a musician and produced a few albums in his own groups after he returned to his country of origin, South Africa, in the mid 1970s and produced a few solo singles in 1981. Wolff later worked as a record producer and songwriter and in 2013, released the single "Goodbye Nelson Mandela", in tribute to the South African president Nelson Mandela who had died at the time. On 1 October 2023, Wolff died in South Africa, at the age of 78. A speaker at Wolff's funeral gave his cause of death as septicaemia.

From 1988 to 2002, Robin Shaw and Robin Box were members of Cliff Bennett and the Rebel Rousers.

Julian Bailey died in July 2001, aged 58. Pete Nelson retired from the music industry in the late 1970s. He died on 23 October 2005 aged 62 from cancer. Neil Landon moved to Germany and sang as a solo artist. He died on 26 March 2020 aged 78, also from cancer.

=== Crucible ===
In 1971, a music project began production in London. The project contained many members of White Plains; those being Ricky Wolff, Robin Shaw, and Robin Box, and later Julian Bailey.

== Members ==
=== Member history ===
The first line-up of White Plains consisted of Ricky Wolff, Tony Burrows, Pete Nelson, Robin Shaw, Robin Box and Roger Hills. Tony Burrows left in early 1970 to focus more on his works with Brotherhood of Man and Edison Lighthouse. In mid 1970, Brian Johnston joined on keyboard and left after a few months. Ricky Wolff left the group in mid 1971, and lead vocals were now split between members. Ron Reynolds joined in 1972, giving the group their most well known line-up. The following two years would contain the stable member line-up of Shaw, Nelson, Box, Reynolds, and Hills. When Shaw left in late 1973, he was briefly replaced by Derek Burgess (later member of Vanity Fare), before he was succeeded by David Kerr-Clemenson, and then Tony Sullivan. Also in 1973, Dave Fulford, Tex Marsh were added into the band. With Pete Nelson and Robin Box being the longest serving and original members from 1969 to 1974. In 1978, Nelson and Box recreated White Plains to release two new singles, although it is not known if any other musicians were in this brief line-up, and if so, were likely left uncredited. The two revivals of the group in the 2000s contained Burrows, Shaw, Box, and Hills.

=== Personnel ===
Key members are texted in Bold

- **Pete Nelson**, vocals, piano, guitar (1969–1974, 1978) (born Peter William Lipscomb, 10 March 1943, Uxbridge, London – died 23 October 2005, Ealing, London)
- **Robin Shaw**, bass (1969–late1973, 2004–2006, 2013) (born Robin George Scrimshaw, 6 October 1943, Hayes, Middlesex)
- **Ricky Wolff**, vocals, guitars, keyboards, flute, saxophone (1969–1971) (born Richard Wolff, 8 July 1945, Pretoria, South Africa – died 1 October 2023, South Africa)
- Tony Burrows, vocals (1969–1970, 2004–2006, 2013)
- **Ron Reynolds**, organ, keyboards, vocals (1972–1974)
- **Robin Box**, lead guitar (1969–1974, 1978, 2004–2006, 2013) (born 19 June 1944)
- Eamonn Carr, Vocals, lead guitar, keyboards. (1973)
- **Roger Hills**, drums (1969–1973, 2004–2006, 2013) (born 1948)
- David Kerr-Clemenson - bass guitar (late1973–1974) (born 1951)
- Roger (Tex) Marsh (percussion) (1973–1974)
- Tony Hall, tenor sax (1971–1972)
- Brent Scott Carter, tenor sax (1971–1972)
- Derek Burgess - bass (1973) (born 4 April 1950, Sheffield)
- Julian Bailey, drums (early-mid 1970)
- Brian Johnston, keyboards (1970) (born 3 March 1945, Bathgate, Scotland)
- Dave Fulford, lead guitar (1973–1974)
- Tony Sullivan, bass guitar (1973–1974)

== Discography ==
=== Albums ===
==== Studio albums ====
Title	Album details	Peak chart positions
Title	Album details	US
White Plains	Released: August 1970; Label: Deram; Released in some countries as My Baby Loves Lovin'	166
When You Are a King	Released: October 1971; Label: Deram	—
New Peaks	Released: 1997; Label: White Plains Music; Limited release; was an unreleased album that had been intended to be the follow-up to When You Are a King.	—
"—" denotes releases that did not chart or were not released in that territory.

==== Compilation albums ====
Title	Album details
My Baby Loves Lovin'	Released: May 1993; Label: Deram
The Deram Records Singles Collection	Released: 23 February 2015; Label: 7T's
The Collection	Released: 29 October 2021; Label: 7T's

=== Singles ===
Title	Year	Peak chart positions										
Title	Year	UK	AUS	BE (FLA)	BE (WA)	CAN	IRE	NL	NZ	SA	SWE	US
"My Baby Loves Lovin'"	1970	9	20	13	47	4	9	—	11	8	12	13
"I've Got You on My Mind"	1970	17	—	—	—	—	17	—	—	—	—	—
"Lovin' You Baby"	1970	—	—	—	—	35	—	—	—	—	—	82
"Julie Do Ya Love Me"	1970	8	—	—	—	—	8	—	—	—	—	—
"Every Little Move She Makes"	1971	—	—	—	—	—	—	—	—	—	19	—
"When You Are a King"	1971	13	100	—	—	—	—	4	—	—	—	—
"Gonna Miss Her Mississippi"	1971	—	—	—	—	—	—	—	—	—	—	—
"I Can't Stop"	1972	—	—	—	—	—	—	—	—	—	—	—
"Dad You Saved the World"	1972	—	—	—	—	—	—	—	—	—	—	—
"Step into a Dream"	1973	21	—	—	—	—	9	—	—	—	—	—
"Does Anybody Know Where My Baby Is?"	1973	—	—	—	—	—	—	—	—	—	—	—
"Julie Anne"	1973	—	—	—	—	—	—	—	—	—	—	—
"Ecstasy"	1974	—	—	—	—	—	—	—	—	—	—	—
"Summer Nights"	1976	—	—	—	—	—	—	—	—	—	—	—
"Dance with You"	1978	—	—	—	—	—	—	—	—	—	—	—
"Wanna Fall in Love"	1978	—	—	—	—	—	—	—	—	—	—	—
"—" denotes releases that did not chart or were not released in that territory.

== See also ==
- List of 1970s one-hit wonders in the United States
- List of performers on Top of the Pops
