= Jerry Vale discography =

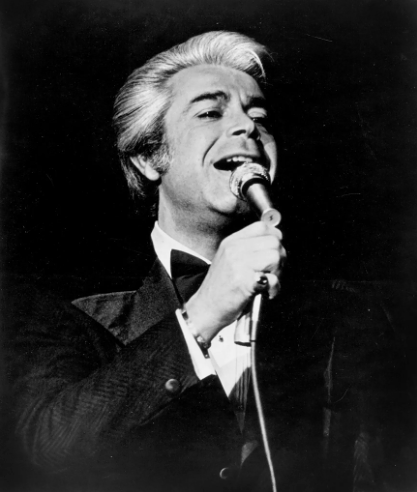
- Jerry Vale singing to an audience in 1976
- Studio albums: 39
- Live albums: 1
- Compilation albums: 3
- Singles: 85

This is the discography of pop singer Jerry Vale. In total he had released 85 singles and 43 albums. Vale placed 20 albums on the Billboard 200, ranking No. 36 among artists in total album placements between 1945 and 1972. In Joel Whitburn's ranking of top album-charting artists from 1955 to 1996, he was listed at No. 205. Vale's debut single was 1953's "You Can Never Give Me Back My Heart", which became a top-30 pop hit.

== Albums ==
=== Studio albums ===
List of albums, with selected chart positions, showing other relevant details
Title	Album details	Peak chart positions		
Title	Album details	US 200	US CB	CAN RPM
I Remember Buddy	Released: 1958; Label: Columbia Records; Formats: LP	—	21	—
I Remember Russ	Released: July 1958; Label: Columbia; Formats: LP	—	—	—
The Same Old Moon	Released: 1959; Label: Columbia; Formats: LP	—	—	—
I Have But One Heart	Released: June 1962; Label: Columbia; Formats: LP	60	48	—
Arrivederci, Roma	Released: January 1963; Label: Columbia; Formats: LP	34	34	—
The Language of Love	Released: July 1963; Label: Columbia; Formats: LP	22	27	—
Till the End of Time and Other Great Love Themes	Released: February 1964; Label: Columbia; Formats: LP	28	16	—
Be My Love	Released: August 1964; Label: Columbia; Formats: LP	26	31	—
Christmas Greetings from Jerry Vale	Released: September 1964; Label: Columbia; Formats: LP	—	—	—
Have You Looked into Your Heart	Released: February 1965; Label: Columbia; Formats: LP	30	16	—
Moonlight Becomes You	Released: April 1965; Label: Columbia; Formats: LP; Note: Repackaged and reissued version of The Same Old Moon	—	—	13
There Goes My Heart	Released: August 1965; Label: Columbia; Formats: LP	42	70	7
It's Magic	Released: January 1966; Label: Columbia; Formats: LP	38	52	—
Great Moments on Broadway	Released: April 1966; Label: Columbia; Formats: LP	111	90	—
Sings Everybody Loves Somebody and Other Hits	Released: August 1966; Label: Columbia; Formats: LP	—	72	—
The Impossible Dream	Released: January 1967; Label: Columbia; Formats: LP, 8-track cartridge, 4-track cartridge	117	102	—
Time Alone Will Tell and Other Great Hits of Today	Released: September 1967; Label: Columbia; Formats: LP, 8-track cartridge, 4-track cartridge	128	115	—
You Don't Have to Say You Love Me	Released: January 1968; Label: Columbia; Formats: LP, 8-track cartridge, 4-track cartridge	163	—	—
I Hear a Rhapsody	Released: April 1968; Label: Columbia; Formats: LP, 8-track cartridge, 4-track cartridge	—	94	—
This Guy's in Love with You	Released: June 1968; Label: Columbia; Formats: LP, 8-track cartridge, 4-track cartridge	135	100	—
Till	Released: January 18, 1969; Label: Columbia; Formats: LP, 8-track cartridge, 4-track cartridge	90	69	—
Where's the Playground Susie?	Released: June 1969; Label: Columbia; Formats: LP	180	—	—
Jerry Vale Sings 16 Greatest Hits of the 60's	Released: January 1970; Label: Columbia; Formats: LP	196	—	—
Let It Be	Released: April 29, 1970; Label: Columbia; Formats: LP	189	—	—
We've Only Just Begun	Released: January 1971; Label: Columbia; Formats: LP	—	—	—
I Don't Know How to Love Her	Released: 1971; Label: Columbia; Formats: LP	—	—	—
Jerry Vale Sings the Great Hits of Nat King Cole	Released: January 5, 1972; Label: Columbia; Formats: LP	200	—	—
Alone Again (Naturally)	Released: 1972; Label: Columbia; Formats: LP	—	—	—
Free as the Wind	Released: 1974; Label: Columbia; Formats: LP	—	—	—

=== Compilation albums ===
List of albums, with selected chart positions, showing other relevant details
Title	Album details	Peak chart positions
Title	Album details	US 200
Jerry Vale's Greatest Hits	Released: 1961; Label: Columbia; Formats: LP	—
More Jerry Vale's Greatest Hits	Released: 1967; Label: Columbia; Formats: LP	—
With Love, Jerry Vale	Released: August 1969; Label: Columbia; Formats: LP	193
As Long as She Needs Me	Released: 1969; Label: Harmony; Formats: LP	—
Hey Look Me Over	Released: 1970; Label: Columbia; Formats: LP	—
More	Released: 1971; Label: Columbia; Formats: LP	—
Born Free	Released: 1971; Label: Columbia; Formats: LP	—
The Jerry Vale Italian Album	Released: 1971; Label: Columbia; Formats: LP	—
Jerry Vale's All-Time Greatest Hits	Released: 1972; Label: Columbia; Formats: LP	—
Jerry Vale Sings the Great Italian Hits	Released: 1973; Label: Columbia; Formats: LP	—
Jerry Vale Sings the Great Love Songs	Released: 1973; Label: Columbia; Formats: LP	—
Love Is a Many-Splendored Thing	Released: 1973; Label: Columbia; Formats: LP	—
What a Wonderful World	Released: 1973; Label: Columbia; Formats: LP	—
Jerry Vale's World	Released: 1974; Label: Columbia; Formats: LP	—
Greatest of Jerry Vale	Released: 1974; Label: Columbia; Formats: LP	—
Love Me the Way I Love You	Released: 1995; Label: Columbia; Formats: CD	—

=== Live albums ===
List of albums, with selected chart positions, showing other relevant details
Title	Album details	Peak chart positions	
Title	Album details	US 200	US CB
Standing Ovation at Carnegie Hall	Recorded in Carnegie Hall, New York City, New York; Released: January 1965; Vale's only live album; Label: Columbia Records	55	25

=== As a collaborative artist ===
Title	Album details	Peak chart positions	
Title	Album details	US	US CB
Girl Meets Boy	With: Peggy King and Felicia Sanders; Released: August 18, 1955; Label: Columbia; Formats: LP	—	—

== Reissue ==
Reissued albums and compilations:

- The Jerry Vale Italian Album (1991)
- 17 Most Requested Songs (1991)
- Standing Ovation (1991)
- Essence of Jerry Vale (1994)
- Personal Christmas Collection (1995)
- Best of: Live (1996)
- Great Italian Hits (1998)
- Greatest Hits (1998)
- Sings the Great Hits of Nat King Cole (1998)
- Till (1998)
- Same Old Moon/It's Magic (1998)
- I Remember Buddy (2000)
- I Remember Russ (2000)
- Language of Love/Till the End of Time (2000)
- Be My Love/Have You Looked into Your Heart (2000)
- Love Songs (2001)
- Super Hits (2001)
- Essential '50s Recordings (2001)
- I Have But One Heart/Arrivederti Roma (2002)
- I Remember Buddy/I Remember Russ (2003)
- Very Best of Jerry Vale (2003)
- Have Yourself a Merry Little Christmas (2003)
- You Don't Have to Say That You Love Me/I Don't Know How to Love Her (2003)
- Girl Meets Boy/Wish Upon a Star (2003)
- There Goes My Heart/I Hear a Rapsody (2005)
- Great Jerry Vale (2005) 3CD set, Australia
- Time Alone Will Tell/This Guy's in Love with You (2008)
- Seven Classic Albums (2014)
- And This Is My Beloved (2017)

== Singles ==
Year	Single (A-side, B-side) Both sides from same album except where indicated	Chart positions				Album
Year	Single (A-side, B-side) Both sides from same album except where indicated	US Hot 100	US CB	US AC	CAN AC	Album
1953	"You Can Never Give Me Back My Heart" b/w "And No One Knows" (from Jerry Vale's Greatest Hits)	29	—	—	—	Non-album tracks
1953	"For Me" b/w "Tired of Dreaming"	—	—	—	—	Non-album tracks
1953	"A Tear, a Kiss, a Smile" b/w "Ask Me"	—	—	—	—	Non-album tracks
1954	"Two Purple Shadows" b/w "And This Is My Beloved"	20	—	—	—	Jerry Vale's Greatest Hits
1954	"I Live Each Day" b/w "Ghost in the Wine"	29	—	—	—	Non-album tracks
1954	"Go" b/w "I'll Follow You" (Non-album track)	—	—	—	—	Jerry Vale's Greatest Hits
1954	"For You My Love" b/w "Love Is a Circus"	—	—	—	—	Non-album tracks
1955	"A Million Moons Ago" b/w "Lolly Linger Longer"	—	—	—	—	Non-album tracks
1955	"Hey Punchinello" b/w "I Live for Only You"	—	—	—	—	Non-album tracks
1955	"When I Let You Go" b/w "And No One Knows" (from Jerry Vale's Greatest Hits)	—	—	—	—	Non-album tracks
1955	"Only Beautiful" b/w "How Do I Love You"	—	—	—	—	Non-album tracks
1955	"Magic Night" b/w "Heaven Came Down to Earth"	—	—	—	—	Non-album tracks
1955	"Miracle in the Rain" b/w "Adelaide"	—	—	—	—	
1956	"Innamorata (Sweetheart)" b/w "Second Ending" (Non-album track)	30	—	—	—	Jerry Vale's Greatest Hits
1956	"You Don't Know Me" b/w "Enchanted"	14	13	—	—	Jerry Vale's Greatest Hits
1956	"Mother Mine" b/w "Tell Me So"	—	—	—	—	Non-album tracks
1957	"All Dressed Up with a Broken Heart" b/w "It Looks Like Love" (Non-album track)	—	—	—	—	I Remember Buddy
1957	"For You My Love" b/w "Don't You Know Me Anymore"	—	—	—	—	Non-album tracks
1957	"Love in the Afternoon" b/w "I'm Not Ashamed"	—	—	—	—	Non-album tracks
1957	"Pretend You Don't See Her" b/w "The Spreading Chestnut" (Non-album track)	52	29	—	—	Jerry Vale's Greatest Hits
1958	"I Always Say" b/w "She"	—	—	—	—	Non-album tracks
1958	"Goodbye Now" b/w "This Is the Place"; Jerry Vale and Mary Mayo	—	—	—	—	Non-album tracks
1958	"With You" b/w "Blue Tears (On a White Wedding Gown)"	—	—	—	—	Non-album tracks
1958	"Go Chase a Moonbeam" b/w "Around the Clock" (Non-album track)	60	80	—	—	Jerry Vale's Greatest Hits
1959	"Me and My Shadow" b/w "A Warm Spot"	—	—	—	—	Non-album tracks
1959	"Bella, Bella Sue" b/w "The Heart Has Won the Game"	—	—	—	—	Non-album tracks
1959	"The Flame" b/w "The Moon Is My Pillow" (from The Same Old Moon)	—	—	—	—	Non-album tracks
1959	"What Do I Care" b/w "Prima Donna" (from Jerry Vale's Greatest Hits)	—	—	—	—	Non-album tracks
1960	"Solitaire" b/w "Please Believe Me" (Non-album track)	—	—	—	—	Jerry Vale's Greatest Hits
1960	"The Dawn of Love (L'Edera) b/w "If" (from Jerry Vale's Greatest Hits)	—	—	—	—	Non-album track
1960	"No Moon at All" b/w "Making Believe You're Here" (Non-album track)	—	—	—	—	The Same Old Moon
1960	"Just Friends" b/w "To Belong" (Non-album track)	—	—	—	—	I Remember Russ
1961	"Camelot" b/w "Thirteen Girls Too Much" (Non-album track)	—	—	—	—	Great Moments on Broadway
1961	"Al di là" b/w "Thinking of Your Happiness" (Non-album track)	—	—	—	—	Arrivederci, Roma
1961	"Another Time, Another Place" b/w "If He Leaves You"	—	—	—	—	Non-album tracks
1962	"If Ever I Would Leave You" b/w "Who Knows" (Non-album track)	—	—	—	—	More Jerry Vale's Greatest Hits
1962	"Ah, Camminare" b/w "One Paradise for Sale"	—	—	—	—	Non-album tracks
1962	"My Geisha (You Are Sympathy to Me)" b/w "I Can't Get You Out of My Heart (Ti Amo-Ti Voglio Amor)" (from I Have But One Heart)	—	—	—	—	Non-album tracks
1962	"From the Bottom of My Heart" b/w "Here's to Us" (Non-album track)	—	—	—	—	Arrivederci, Roma
1963	"(You Got Me) Doin' What I Said I'd Never Do" b/w "One More Blessing" (from There Goes My Heart)	—	—	—	—	Non-album track
1963	"Old Cape Cod" b/w "Theme for Young Lovers (Where Is My Someone)" (Non-album track)	118	114	—	—	Have You Looked into Your Heart
1963	"Mala Femmina" b/w "Maria Elena" (from The Language of Love)	—	—	—	—	I Have But One Heart
1963	"On and On" b/w "The Peking Theme (So Little Time)" (Non-album track)	123	—	—	—	Till the End of Time
1964	"The Love Goddess" b/w "Where Love Has Gone" (from As Long as She Needs Me)	—	—	—	—	Have You Looked into Your Heart
1964	"The Lights of Roma" b/w "As Sure as Night Must Fall" (Non-album track)	—	—	—	—	The Jerry Vale Italian Album
1964	"Have You Looked Into Your Heart" b/w "Andiamo"	24	29	1	6	Have You Looked into Your Heart
1965	"For Mama" b/w "Ti Adora" (from Have You Looked into Your Heart)	54	35	13	—	More Jerry Vale's Greatest Hits
1965	"Tears Keep on Falling" b/w "Now" (from The Language of Love)	96	65	30	—	Have You Looked into Your Heart
1965	"Where Were You When I Needed You" b/w "I Don't Wanna Go Home" (Non-album track)	99	92	19	—	More Jerry Vale's Greatest Hits
1965	"Deep in Your Heart" b/w "If It Isn't in Your Heart" (from It's Magic)	118	—	16	—	Non-album track
1965	"Big Wide World" /	—	—	—	25	It's Magic
1966	"Ashamed"	—	—	28	22	It's Magic
1966	"Less Than Tomorrow" b/w "This Day of Days" (from Till the End of Time)	—	—	14	—	Everrbody Loves Somebody and Other Hits
1966	"My Melancholy Baby" b/w "It's Magic"	—	—	—	—	It's Magic
1966	"It'll Take a Little Time" b/w "Palermo" (from The Language of Love)	120	—	14	—	Everybody Loves Somebody and Other Hits
1966	"Dommage, Dommage (Too Bad, Too Bad)" b/w "Promises" (Non-album track)	93	113	5	—	The Impossible Dream
1967	"I've Lost My Heart Again" b/w "Somewhere" (from More Jerry Vale's Greatest Hits)	132	128	32	—	Non-album tracks
1967	"Have You Seen the One I Love Go By" /	—	—	30	—	Non-album tracks
1967	"Signs"	—	—	36	—	Non-album tracks
1967	"Time Alone Will Tell (Non Pensare a Me)" b/w "So Near, Yet So Far" (from Till the End of Time)	126	95	6	—	Time Alone Will Tell
1967	"Blame It on Me" b/w "In Time"	—	—	26	—	Non-album tracks
1967	"In the Back of My Heart" b/w "I Love New England"	—	—	5	—	Non-album tracks
1968	"Don't Tell My Heart to Stop Loving You" b/w "When I'm with You" (Non-album track)	—	—	6	—	This Guy's in Love with You
1968	"My Love, Forgive Me (Amore, Scusami)" b/w "I Never Let a Day Go By" (Non-album track)	—	—	25	—	Time Alone Will Tell
1968	"That Girl Would Be So Pretty" /	—	—	37	—	Non-album tracks
1968	"Till Now"	—	—	39	—	Non-album tracks
1968	"With Pen in Hand" b/w "The Look of Love"	—	—	30	—	This Guy's in Love With You
1968	"There's a Baby" b/w "Where Are They Now"	—	—	—	—	Non-album tracks
1969	"Close to Cathy" b/w "Fa Fa Fa (Live for Today)"	—	—	—	—	Non-album tracks
1969	"He Who Loves" b/w "(They Long to Be) Close to You"	—	—	34	29	Non-album tracks
1969	"Life" b/w "Congratulations, I Guess"	—	—	28	36	Non-album tracks
1969	"This Is My Life (La Vita)" b/w "What's Wrong with My World"	—	—	26	23	Non-album tracks
1970	"Hello and Goodbye" b/w "Look Homeward Angel" (from Till)	—	—	40	—	Non-album tracks
1970	"I'll Never Fall in Love Again" b/w "Lovin' Time" (Non-album track)	—	—	—	—	Let It Be
1970	"I Climbed the Mountain" b/w "Love Never Goes Away"	—	—	27	—	Non-album tracks
1970	"Stay Awhile" b/w "It's All in the Game" (Non-album track)	—	127	27	33	Let It Be
1971	"Point Me in the Direction of Alburquerque" b/w "Perfect Love"	—	—	—	—	Non-album tracks
1971	"My Little Girl (Angel All A-Glow)" b/w "Is It Asking Too Much" (from It's Magic)	—	—	36	—	Non-album tracks
1971	"Which Way You Goin' Girl" b/w "Moonlight"	—	—	—	—	I Don't Know How to Love Her
1971	Two Purple Shadows" (re-recording) b/w "I Found You (Just in Time)"	—	—	—	—	Non-album tracks
1972	"Pretend" b/w "Too Young"	—	—	—	—	Jerry Vale Sings the Great Hits of Nat King Cole
1972	"Smile" b/w "All I Ever Wanted" (Non-album track)	—	—	—	—	Jerry Vale Sings the Great Hits of Nat King Cole
1972	"Mister Good Times" b/w "Till We Two Are One"	—	—	—	—	Non-album tracks
1972	"Where Is the Love"	—	—	—	—	Alone Again (Naturally)
1973	"He" b/w "If I Give My Heart to You" (Non-album track)	—	—	—	—	Alone Again (Naturally)
1973	"Mon Amour" b/w "The Circle Never Ends"	—	—	—	—	Non-album tracks
1974	"Free as the Wind" b/w "Reason to Believe"	—	—	—	—	Free as The Wind
1978	"Toot Toot Tootsie (Goodbye)" b/w "Now Is Forever"	—	—	—	—	Non-album tracks
"—" denotes releases that did not chart or were not released in that territory.
