= Sings Everybody Loves Somebody and Other Hits =

Studio album by Jerry Vale
- Released: August 1966
- Genre: Country-pop
- Length: 27:56
- Labels: Columbia; CS-9330/CL-2530
- Producer: Mike Berniker

Jerry Vale chronology
Great Moments on Broadway (1966)	Sings Everybody Loves Somebody and Other Hits (1966)	The Impossible Dream (1967)

Singles from Sings Everybody Loves Somebody and Other Hits
- 1. "Less Than Tomorrow" Released: April 1966; 2. "It'll Take a Little Time" Released: June 1966

Sings Everybody Loves Somebody and Other Hits is a studio album by American singer and actor Jerry Vale released in mid 1966 by Columbia Records. The album consists mainly of country hits and standards across 12 tracks. It received a positive reception and No. 72 on the Cashbox, and No. 58 on the Record World chart.

== Critical reception ==
The album received a positive critical reception upon its release. Billboard put the album in its "Pop Spotlight Picks" section, writing: "In the current trend of pop vocalists delving into the country music songbeg, Vale offers top tunes from the Nashville scene," adding that he's "supported by the exceptional arrangements of Marty Manning." They highlighted "I Can't Stop Loving You," "I Love You Because," and "Make the World Go Away." Cashbox in its "Pop Picks" reviews stated that it's a "fine crop of the more recent lovey dovey songs performed by a master of sentiment."

== Chart performance and singles ==
The album missed Billboard magazine's Top LP's chart for the first time since Jerry Vale's Greatest Hits in 1961, marking a decline in chart performance, although it would reach the bottom-half of the charts by other publications. It entered Cashbox magazine's Top 100 Albums chart in the issue dated October 15, 1966, reaching No. 72 during its seven weeks on the chart. The album debuted on the Record World 100 Top LP's chart in the issue dated October 1, 1966, climbing to No. 58 during also a eleven-week stay on it.

"Less Than Tomorrow" was first released as a single in April 1966, backed by "This Day of Days" from 1964's Till the End of Time and Other Great Love Themes. The single debuted on the Billboard Easy Listening chart in the issue dated April 23, 1966, climbing to the top-20 at No. 14 during its twelve weeks on it. "It'll Take a Little Time" was released as the lead single in June 1966. It was backed by "Palermo", lifted from his 1963 album The Language of Love. It reached the top-20 on America's Billboard Easy Listening chart, rising to the number 14 position as well, but managed to reach the pop charts at No. 120 in late July 1966.

== Track listing ==
Side one
No.	Title	Writer(s)	Length
1.	"I Can't Stop Loving You"	Don Gibson	2:48
2.	"Send Me the Pillow You Dream On"	Hank Locklin	2:43
3.	"Everybody Loves Somebody"	Irving Taylor; Ken Lane	2:34
4.	"I Want to Go with You"	Hank Cochran	2:30
5.	"I Love You Because"	Leon Payne	3:06
Total length:			13:41

Side two
No.	Title	Writer(s)	Length
1.	"What's He Doin' in My World?"	Carl Belew; Billy Joe Moore; Eddie Bush	2:28
2.	"Think I'll Go Somewhere (And Cry Myself to Sleep)"	Bill Anderson	2:58
3.	"The First Thing Ev'ry Morning (And the Last Thing Ev'ry Night)"	Jimmy Dean; Ruth Roberts	1:52
4.	"Make the World Go Away"	Hank Cochran	2:14
5.	"Less Than Tomorrow"	Bobby Weinstein; Teddy Randazzo	2:38
6.	"It'll Take a Little Time"	Sid Tepper; Roy C. Bennett	2:05
Total length:			14:15

== Charts ==
Chart peaks for Sings Everybody Loves Somebody and Other Hits
Chart (1966)	Peak position
US Cashbox Top 100 Albums	72
US Record World 100 Top LP's	58

== Personnel ==
All credits are adapted from the liner notes of Sings Everybody Loves Somebody and Other Hits.

- Jerry Vale – lead vocals
- Marty Manning – arranger, conductor
- Mike Berniker – producer
- Don Hunstein – photography
