= Time Alone Will Tell and Other Great Hits of Today =

Studio album by Jerry Vale
- Released: September 1967
- Genre: Traditional pop
- Length: 26:57
- Labels: Columbia; CL-2684; CS-9484
- Producer: Mike Berniker

Jerry Vale chronology
The Impossible Dream (1967)	Time Alone Will Tell and Other Great Hits of Today (1967)	You Don't Have to Say You Love Me (1968)

Singles from Time Alone Will Tell and Other Great Hits of Today
- 1. "Time Alone Will Tell (Non Pensare a Me)" Released: March 1967; 2. "My Love, Forgive Me (Amore, scusami)" Released: April 1968

Time Alone Will Tell and Other Great Hits of Today is a studio album by American singer and actor Jerry Vale released in mid 1967 by Columbia Records. The album consisted mainly of songs from motion pictures and recent pop hits, containing a total of 11 tracks. Two singles were included as well, "Time Alone Will Tell (Non Pensare a Me)", which was a big easy listening in early 1967, and "My Love, Forgive Me (Amore, Scusami)", taken from the album and released later in 1968. Time Alone Will Tell and Other Great Hits of Today received a positive reception and reached the US album charts. Results were published by Billboard, Cashbox, and Record World. Chart positions varied from number 128 to number 106.

== Background and recording ==
Jerry Vale had been a recording artist for Columbia since the 1950s, recording several pop hits. In the early 1960s, Vale achieved major commercial success via his albums featuring English and Italian standards. Vale would record newer songs for Time Alone Will Tell and Other Great Hits of Today. The title track itself was the English version of "Non Pensare a Me", the winner of the Sanremo Music Festival held in Italy. Like his previous releases, the album was produced by Mike Berniker with arrangements by Glenn Osser and Marty Manning.

== Content ==
Time Alone Will Tell and Other Great Hits of Today consisted of 11 tracks in total. Two songs were originals, "The Day That We Said Goodbye" and "I Won't Cry Anymore". The rest were recent pop hits or songs from motion pictures, films, and musicals. Both "Love Me with All Your Heart (Cuando Calienta el Sol)" and "My Love, Forgive Me (Amore, scusami)" achieved peak popularity in 1964, with hit versions by the Ray Charles Singers and Robert Goulet respectively. James Last is credited for two compositions, for the original "The Day That We Said Goodbye" and 1966's "Games That Lovers Play (Eine Ganze Nacht)".

== Chart performance and singles ==
The album debuted on Billboard magazine's Top LP's chart in the issue dated September 16, 1967, peaking at No. 128 during a six-week run on the chart. The album entered Cashbox magazine's Looking Ahead Albums chart in the issue dated October 14, 1967, reaching No. 115 during a shorter four-week run on it. It entered the Record World 100 Top LP's chart in the issue dated October 14, 1967, peaking at No. 106 in December 1967 during a seventeen-week run on the chart.

"Time Alone Will Tell (Non Pensare a Me)" was released as a single in March 1967 backed by "So Near...Yet So Far". It became a top-10 single on America's Billboard Easy Listening chart, rising to the number 6 position. The song debuted on Billboard magazine's pop-oriented Bubbling Under the Hot 100 chart in the issue dated April 22, peaking at number 126 during a four-week run on it. "Time Alone Will Tell" became Vale's third biggest Easy Listening hit at that point, and the final Bubbling Under the Hot 100 entry of his career. "My Love, Forgive Me (Amore, scusami)" was taken from the album and released a year later in April 1968, rising to the number 25 position the Billboard Easy Listening chart.

== Track listing ==
Side one
No.	Title	Writer(s)	Length
1.	"My Love, Forgive Me (Amore, scusami)"	Gino Mescoli; S. Lee; Vito Pallavicini	3:04
2.	"My Cup Runneth Over" (from the musical production I Do! I Do!)	Harvey Schmidt; Tom Jones	3:05
3.	"Born Free" (from the Columbia Pictures film Born Free)	Don Black; John Barry	2:15
4.	"All" (theme from the motion picture Run for Your Wife)	M. Grudeff; Nino Oliviero; Raymond Jessel	2:46
5.	"Time Alone Will Tell (Non Pensare a Me)"	Alberto Testa; E. Sciorilli; Norman Newell	2:32
Total length:			13:35

Side two
No.	Title	Writer(s)	Length
1.	"Love Me with All Your Heart (Cuando Calienta el Sol)"	Carlos Rigual; Mario Rigual; M. Vaughn	2:24
2.	"Games That Lovers Play (Eine Ganze Nacht)"	Eddie Snyder; James Last; Larry Kusik; Rudolf Gunter-Loose	2:53
3.	"This Is My Song" (from the Universal Pictures film A Countess from Hong Kong)	Charlie Chaplin	2:25
4.	"I Won't Cry Anymore"	Al Frisch; Fred Wise	2:29
5.	"The Day That We Said Goodbye"	James Last; Scott English; Stanley J. Gelber	2:45
Total length:			13:22

== Charts ==
Chart peaks for Time Alone Will Tell and Other Great Hits of Today
Chart (1967)	Peak position
US Billboard Top LP's	128
US Cashbox Top 100 Albums	115
US Record World LP's Coming Up	106

== Personnel ==
All credits are adapted from the liner notes of Time Alone Will Tell and Other Great Hits of Today.

- Jerry Vale – lead vocals
- Glenn Osser – arranger, conductor
- Marty Manning – arranger, conductor
- Don Hunstein – photography
- Mike Berniker – producer
