= Where Were You When I Needed You (Jerry Vale song) =

Single by Jerry Vale

from the album More Greatest Hits
- B-side: "I Don't Wanna Go Home"
- Released: June 1965
- Genre: Easy listening
- Length: 2:32
- Label: Columbia; 4-43337
- Songwriter: M. Moore-B. Wayne
- Producer: Ernie Altschuler

Jerry Vale singles chronology
"Tears Keep on Falling" (1965)	"Where Were You When I Needed You" (1965)	"Deep in Your Heart" (1965)

Professional ratings
Review scores
Source	Rating
Billboard	Positive (Spotlight Pick)
Cashbox	A-grade (Pick of the Week)
Record World	4/5 stars

"Where Were You When I Needed You" is a song written by songwriting duo M. Moore-B. Wayne and most notably performed by Jerry Vale, who released it as a single under Columbia Records in mid 1965, with a positive reception and a moderate chart presence. The song did not see any immediate studio album inclusions; instead, it made it to his 1967 More Greatest Hits compilation.

== Jerry Vale version ==
=== Background and release ===
Columbia Records' Guy Mitchell first noticed Jerry Vale in the early 1950s, after which Vale began recording for the label. In 1964, Teddy Randazzo's "Have You Looked into Your Heart" brought Vale back to the top-40 of the singles charts. This made Vale's following singles chart again, though momentum was waning by mid 1965. In June of that year, Vale recorded and released "Where Were You When I Needed You", backed by Danny DiMinno's "I Don't Wanna Go Home", originally performed by Jimmy Roselli. The songs were produced by Ernie Altschuler, while Marty Manning arranged them.

=== Critical reception ===
The single received positive critical reception upon its release. Cashbox reviewed the single in early May and classified it as a "Pick of the Week", meaning it was an A-grade single. They stated that "looks like Jerry Vale will have one of the big summer sellers with this excellent follow-up to his 'Tears Are Falling' click called 'Where Were You When I Needed You.'" The publication noted that the "tune is an easy-going oldie-sound ing chorus-backed romancer about a fella who finally stops carrying the torch for his ex-girl." Billboard described it as a "summertime, rousing sing-a-long rhythm ballad with all the ingredients of a fast chart rider." Record World magazine gave the track four stars and believed that "Guy with chorus swings out on this lilting singalong," which will "capture those who go for this mellow type ditty."

=== Chart performance ===
"Where Were You When I Needed You" reached the bottom half of the pop charts, while doing better on the adult-oriented charts. It debuted on the Billboard Hot 100 on August 7, 1965, reaching No. 99 during a its one week on it. The track entered the Cashbox Top 100 Singles chart in the issue also dated August 7, 1965, peaking at a higher No. 92 during its two-week stay on it, while reaching a similar No. 94 on the Record World 100 Top Pops on August 14, 1965. The song reached the top-40 on the Billboard Easy Listening chart as well, rising to the number 19 position during a longer ten-week run on it.

=== Track listing ===
7" single (Columbia 4-43337, 1965)
No.	Title	Writer(s)	Performance rights handled by	Length
1.	"Where Were You When I Needed You"	M. Moore-B. Wayne	Broadcast Music, Inc.	2:40
2.	"I Don't Wanna Go Home"	Danny DiMinno	ASCAP	2:30

== Charts ==
Chart performance for "Where Were You When I Needed You"
Chart (1965)	Peak position
US Billboard Hot 100	99
US Billboard Easy Listening	19
US Cashbox Top 100 Singles	92
US Record World 100 Top Pops	94
