= I Remember Russ =

Studio album by Jerry Vale
- Released: July 1958
- Recorded: July 14, 1958
- Studio: Columbia 30th Street Studio
- Genre: Traditional pop
- Length: 39:24
- Labels: Columbia; CS-8175/CL-1164

Jerry Vale chronology
I Remember Buddy (1958)	I Remember Russ (1958)	The Same Old Moon (1959)

I Remember Russ is a studio album by American singer and actor Jerry Vale released in mid 1958 by Columbia Records. The album contains 12 tracks, all cover songs of Russ Columbo hits. It received a mostly positive reception, with all the reviewers also praising Glen Osser's arrangements, but the album failed to chart.

== Background, recording, and release ==
Jerry Vale was a ballad singer, originally breaking out in the early 1950s with pop hits such as "You Can Never Give Me Back My Heart" and "Two Purple Shadows". In early 1958, Columbia let Vale record his first solo-studio-album, a tribute to Buddy Clark, titled I Remember Buddy. The album's success on the charts prompted Columbia to get Vale back to the studio a cut a second tribute album.

This time, it was to Russ Columbo, a vocalist most popular in the early 1930s, recording most of his material in a few years before his death. Under producers Mitch Miller and Al Ham, Vale recorded the album in one session on July 14, 1958, in Columbia 30th Street Studio at New York City. Arrangements and the orchestra was provided by Glen Osser. It was released the same month, and Vale went on to promote the album via appearences on shows, with people such as Bob Crosby. I Remember Russ missed the charts after its release.

=== Later reissues ===
After Vale's comeback with I Have But One Heart in 1962, Columbia repressed the album in the US. In 2000, Legacy Records reissued the album as a compact disc, under producers Darcy Proper and Didier C. Deutsch. Credited also was Harold Chapman as the engineer.

== Critical reception ==
Professional ratings
Review scores
Source	Rating
AllMusic	3/5 stars
Billboard	4/5 stars
The Virgin Encyclopedia of Popular Music	2/5 stars
Cashbox	Positive (Pop Picks)

The album received a positive critical reception upon its release. Cashbox in its album reviews stated that Vales handles the songs "with vibrance, and the caresses of good crooning," adding: "The Glenn Osser ork lushly supports the full Vale delivery." Giving it four stars to showcase "very strong sales potential", Billboard believed that "The tunes themselves, plus certain vocal characteristics of Jerry Vale as well, are reminiscent of Russ Colunbo in this attractive new set."

Retrospectives were more mixed. William Ruhlmann of AllMusic said that "Vale, for his part, just applied his usual smooth, ringing sound to every song with little variance in mood, an effect echoed in Osser's arrangements," calling it a "worthy follow-up to" I Remember Buddy. On the other hand, The Virgin Encyclopedia of Popular Music gave the album a two-star rating, believing the album had "flaws".

== Track listing ==
Side one
No.	Title	Writer(s)	Length
1.	"Sweet and Lovely"	Gus Arnheim; Jules LeMare; Harry Tobias	3:26
2.	"Prisoner of Love"	Russ Columbo; Clarence Gaskill; Leo Robin	3:29
3.	"Auf Wiedersehen, My Dear"	Milton Ager; Al Goodhart; Al Hoffman; Ed G. Nelson	3:26
4.	"All of Me"	Gerald Marks; Seymour Simons	2:35
5.	"I've Got a Feeling I'm Falling"	Harry Link; Billy Rose; Fats Waller	3:21
6.	"Paradise"	Nacio Herb Brown; Gordon Clifford	3:13
Total length:			19:30

Side two
No.	Title	Writer(s)	Length
1.	"Just Friends"	John Klenner; Sam M. Lewis	2:57
2.	"You're My Everything"	Mort Dixon; Harry Warren; Joe Young	3:26
3.	"Call Me Darling"	Dorothy Dick; Martin Fryberg; Rolf Marbot; Bert Reisfeld	3:54
4.	"You Call It Madness"	Russ Columbo; Con Conrad; Gladys Dubois]Paul Gregory	3:39
5.	"Poor Butterfly"	John Golden; Raymond Hubbell	3:14
6.	"You Try Somebody Else"	Lew Brown; Buddy DeSylva; Ray Henderson	2:44
Total length:			19:54

== Personnel ==
All credits are adapted from the liner notes of I Remember Russ.

- Jerry Vale – lead vocals
- Glen Osser – arranger, conductor
- Al Ham – producer
- Mitch Miller – producer
