= I Hear a Rhapsody (Jerry Vale album) =

Studio album by Jerry Vale
- Released: April 1968
- Genre: Pop
- Length: 35:34
- Labels: Columbia; CS-9634
- Producer: Mike Berniker

Jerry Vale chronology
You Don't Have to Say You Love Me (1968)	I Hear a Rhapsody (1968)	This Guy's in Love with You (1968)

I Hear a Rhapsody is a studio album by American singer and actor Jerry Vale released in early 1968 by Columbia Records. The album consisted mainly of traditional pop standards, containing a total of 11 tracks. The album received a positive critical reception and reached the US album charts. Results were published by Cashbox (No. 94).

== Reception ==
Record World called the album a "superb collection of standards sung glossily by Jerry," believing the Glenn Osser arrangements were "breathtaking". Cashbox stated that " Assisted by the lush arrangements and conducting skills of Glenn Osser, Vale brings his romantic tenor voice to bear upon 'Stella By Starlight,' 'I'll Walk Alone,' 'I Hear A Rhapsody,' 'Stardust.'"

The album entered Cashbox magazine's Top 100 Albums chart in the issue dated May 25, 1968, reaching No. 95 during its brief one-week appearance on it. It was one of the few Vale albums to miss the Billboard Top 200 LP's chart, but to reach the Cashbox one.

== Track listing ==
Side one
No.	Title	Writer(s)	Length
1.	"Stella by Starlight"	Ned Washington; Victor Young	2:56
2.	"It's Easy to Remember"	Lorenz Hart; Richard Rodgers	3:36
3.	"I Can Dream, Can't I?"	Irving Kahal; Sammy Fain	3:25
4.	"Symphony"	Alex Alstone; Jack Lawrence	3:06
5.	"I'll Walk Alone"	Jule Styne; Sammy Cahn	3:21
6.	"The Nearness of You"	Hoagy Carmichael; Ned Washington	3:41
Total length:			20:05

Side two
No.	Title	Writer(s)	Length
1.	"I Hear a Rhapsody"	Dick Gasparre; George Fragos; Jack Baker	2:27
2.	"I Wanna Be Loved"	Billy Rose; Edward Heyman; Johnny Green	3:31
3.	"Stardust"	Hoagy Carmichael; Mitchell Parish	3:56
4.	"Pretend"	Cliff Parman; Frank LaVere; Lew Douglas	3:14
5.	"Love Letters"	Edward Heyman; Victor Young	2:21
Total length:			15:29

== Charts ==
Chart peaks for I Hear a Rhapsody
Chart (1968)	Peak position
US Cashbox Top 100 Albums	94

== Personnel ==
All credits are adapted from the liner notes of I Hear a Rhapsody.

- Glenn Osser – arranger, conductor
- Frank Laico – engineer
- Stan Weiss – engineer
- Don Hunstein – photography
- Sandy Speiser – photography
- Mike Berniker – producer
