= Tears Keep on Falling =

Single by Jerry Vale

from the album Have You Looked into Your Heart
- B-side: "Now"
- Released: April 1965
- Genre: Easy listening
- Length: 2:18
- Label: Columbia; 4-41238
- Songwriter: Lawrence Madison
- Producer: Ernie Altschuler

Jerry Vale singles chronology
"For Mama" (1965)	"Tears Keep on Falling" (1965)	"Where Were You When I Needed You" (1965)

Professional ratings
Review scores
Source	Rating
Billboard	Positive (Spotlight Pick)
Cashbox	A-grade (Pick of the Week)

"Tears Keep on Falling" is a song written by Lawrence Madison and most notably performed by Jerry Vale, who released it as a single under Columbia Records in early 1965, with a positive reception and a moderate chart presence. It was his fourth and final single from his 1965 album Have You Looked into Your Heart.

== Jerry Vale version ==
=== Background and release ===
Jerry Vale was first noticed by Columbia Records' Guy Mitchell in the early 1950s, after which Vale began recording for the records label. He quickly had a few traditional pop hits, but by the 1960s, they were less common. Following "Have You Looked into Your Heart" in 1964, which hit the top-40, Columbia scheduled to release "Tears Keep on Falling" for April 1965. It was backed by an Italian song "Now", lifted from his 1963 album The Language of Love, on the B-side. Marty Manning conducted and arranged the chorus and orchestra on both sides, with production by Ernie Altschuler.

=== Critical reception ===
The single was met with a positive critical reception upon its release. Cashbox reviewed the single in early May and classified it as a "Pick of the Week", meaning it was an A-grade single. They stated that "both Top 40 and middle-of-the-road deejays should really dig this new Jerry Vale platter called 'Tears Keep On Falling,'" adding that "The tune is an easy-going, shufflin', chorus-backed romantic ballad in the currently popular years-back lush style." Billboard magazine gave the single a positive review stating "nother commercial winner much in the vein of Vale's 'Have You Looked Into Your Heart' success," calling it a "Good group, sing-a-long style for all forms of programming."

=== Chart performance ===
"Tears Keep On Falling" did not restore momentum to Vale's singles' chart performance. It debuted on the Billboard Hot 100 on May 22, 1965, reaching No. 96 during a three-week run on it. The track entered the Cashbox Top 100 Singles chart in the issue dated May 15, 1965, peaking at a higher No. 65 during its five-week stay on it. The song reached the top-40 on the Billboard Easy Listening chart as well, rising to the number 30 position in June.

=== Track listing ===
7" single (Columbia 4-43252, 1965)
No.	Title	Writer(s)	Performance rights handled by	Length
1.	"Tears Keep on Falling"	Lawrence Madison	ASCAP	2:18
2.	"Now"	Al Frisch; Charles Tobias	ASCAP	2:30

== Charts ==
Chart performance for "Tears Keep on Falling"
Chart (1965)	Peak position
US Billboard Hot 100	96
US Billboard Easy Listening	30
US Cashbox Top 100 Singles	65
