= Have You Looked into Your Heart (album) =

Studio album by Jerry Vale
- Released: February 1965
- Genre: Traditional pop
- Length: 27:27
- Labels: Columbia; CS-9113/CL-2313
- Producer: Ernie Altschuler

Jerry Vale chronology
Standing Ovation at Carnegie Hall (1965)	Have You Looked into Your Heart (1965)	There Goes My Heart (1965)

Singles from Have You Looked into Your Heart
- 1. "Old Cape Cod" Released: July 25, 1963; 2. "The Love Goddess" Released: July 30, 1964; 3. "Have You Looked into Your Heart" Released: November 23, 1964; 4. "Tears Keep on Falling" Released: April 19, 1964

Have You Looked into Your Heart is a studio album by American singer and actor Jerry Vale released in early 1965 by Columbia Records. The album consists mainly of traditional pop standards both in Italian and English across 12 tracks. Following the major success of the namesake single, it received positive reviews and reached No. 30 on the Billboard chart, No. 16 on the Cashbox chart, and No. 15 on the Record World one. An additional single was lifted from the album.

== Critical reception ==
The album received a positive critical reception upon its release. Billboard put the album in its "Spotlight Pick" section, writing: "The most successful single record in the Vale career, 'Have You Looked into You Heart,' is the basis for this outstanding package." They noted that the "Material is in the vein of his hit as he performs 'Have You Ever Been Lonely' and 'Tears Keep on Falling'; all done in the fine big voice Vale style." Cashbox in its "Pop Picks" reviews stated that "the crooner has come up with another set that has sure fire sales built right into it." They said "The vocalist is in fine fettle as he runs through a dozen romantic tunes of Italian and American descent," calling it a "winner's circle selection."

== Chart performance and singles ==
Have You Looked into Your Heart was the another of Vale's LPs to reach the top-40 on the US album charts. The album debuted on Billboard magazine's Top LP's chart in the issue dated March 6, 1965, peaking at No. 30 during a twenty-three-week run on the chart. It entered Cashbox magazine's Top 100 Albums chart in the issue also dated March 6, 1964, climbing to No. 16 during a nineteen-week run on it. The album debuted on the Record World 100 Top LP's chart in the issue dated March 6, 1964, reaching No. 15. during its sixteen-week stay on the chart.

== Track listing ==
Side one
No.	Title	Writer(s)	Length
1.	"Have You Looked into Your Heart"	Billy Barberis; Bobby Weinstein; Teddy Randazzo	2:22
2.	"I'll Never Forgive You"	Bernie Friedman; P.S. Parker	2:25
3.	"Have You Ever Been Lonely (Have You Ever Been Blue)"	Brown; Peter De Rose	2:30
4.	"I'm Yours"	E. Y. Harburg; Johnny Green	2:32
5.	"Andiamo"	Eddie Snyder; Estelle Levitt	1:55
6.	"Always in My Heart"	Ernesto Lecuona; Kim Gannon	2:25
Total length:			14:09

Side two
No.	Title	Writer(s)	Length
1.	"Tears Keep on Falling"	Lawrence Madison	2:18
2.	"There Are Such Things"	Abel Baer; George W. Meyer; Stanley Adams	1:52
3.	"I Dream of You"	Marjorie Goetschius; Edna Osser	2:07
4.	"The Love Goddess"	Mack David; Percy Faith	2:29
5.	"Old Cape Cod"	Allan Jeffrey; Claire Rothrock; Milton Yakus	2:24
6.	"Ti Adoro"	R. Pataky	2:08
Total length:			13:18

== Charts ==
Chart peaks for Have You Looked into Your Heart
Chart (1965)	Peak position
US Billboard Top LP's	30
US Cashbox Top 100 Albums	16
US Record World 100 Top LP's	15

== Personnel ==
All credits are adapted from the liner notes of Have You Looked into Your Heart.

- Jerry Vale – lead vocals
- Glen Osser – (tracks: A2) arranger, conductor
- Marty Manning – (tracks: A1, A3-6, B1-6) arranger, conductor
- Ernie Altschuler – producer
- Bob Cato – photography
