= Go Chase a Moonbeam =

Single by Jerry Vale

from the album Jerry Vale's Greatest Hits
- B-side: "Around the Clock"
- Published: September 11, 1958 by M. Witmark & Sons; EP122602
- Released: August 1958
- Genre: Traditional pop
- Length: 2:30
- Label: Columbia; 4-41238
- Songwriters: Paul Vance; Lee Pockriss

Jerry Vale singles chronology
"With You" (1958)	"Go Chase a Moonbeam" (1958)	"Me and My Shadow" (1959)

Professional ratings
Review scores
Source	Rating
Billboard	79/100
Cashbox	B-grade (Very Good)

"Go Chase a Moonbeam" is a song written by songwriting duo Paul Vance and Lee Pockriss and most notably performed by Jerry Vale, who released it as a single under Columbia Records in late 1958, with a positive reception and a moderate chart presence. The song was included in Vale's compilation albums thereafter.

== Jerry Vale version ==
=== Background and release ===
Jerry Vale was first noticed by Columbia Records' Guy Mitchell in the early 1950s, after which Vale began recording for the records label. He quickly had a few traditional pop hits, but by 1958, they were less common. Following a string of commercially unsuccessful singles after his 1957 "Pretend You Don't See Her", Columbia scheduled to release "Go Chase a Moonbeam" for August 1958. It was backed by a novelty song, "Around the Clock" on the B-side, which was a non-album release. Glen Osser conducted and arranged the chorus and orchestra on both sides. Vale would go on to promote the single in such venues as the Frolic located at Revere, Massachusetts.

=== Critical reception ===
The single was met with a positive critical reception upon its release. Cashbox reviewed the single in mid-September and classified it as a "Very good" record, giving it a B grade. They stated that "Vale lends his smooth, polished voice to an inviting latin tempo romantic ditty," adding that "Lyrics and delivery are most pleasant." They concluded that "Jockeys should give this one a good sendoff too." Billboard magazine gave the single a positive review and rating in early September as well, calling it "nice" and praising Glen Osser's orchestral backing.

=== Chart performance ===
"Go Chase a Moonbeam" was the final of seven hits Vale had in the 1950s, being referred to as one of his bigger ones. It debuted on the Billboard Hot 100 on October 13, 1958, reaching No. 60 during a seven-week run on it. The track entered the Cashbox Top 100 Singles chart in the issue dated October 18, 1958, peaking at a higher No. 80 during its eight-week stay on it. This would be Vale's last single hit until 1963's "Old Cape Cod".

=== Track listing ===
7" single (Columbia 4-41238, 1958)
No.	Title	Writer(s)	Performance rights handled by	Length
1.	"Go Chase a Moonbeam"	Paul Vance; Lee Pockriss	ASCAP	2:30
2.	"Around the Clock"	Bob Hilliard; M. Delugg	ASCAP	2:25

== Charts ==
Chart performance for "Go Chase a Moonbeam"
Chart (1958)	Peak position
US Billboard Hot 100	60
US Cashbox Top 100 Singles	80
