= The Same Old Moon =

Studio album by Jerry Vale
- Released: October 1959
- Genre: Traditional pop
- Length: 37:35
- Labels: Columbia; CS-8175/CL-1380

Jerry Vale chronology
I Remember Russ (1958)	The Same Old Moon (1959)	I Have But One Heart (1962)

The Same Old Moon is a studio album by American singer and actor Jerry Vale released in late 1959 by Columbia Records. The album contains 12 tracks all with the word Moon. It received a positive reception, but did not chart. It would only be after Columbia's repackaging and reissue of the album in 1965 that it reached the Canadian and US charts, titled Moonlight Becomes You.

== Critical reception ==
The album received a positive critical reception upon its release. Cashbox in its album reviews stated that "Lush ballads (and a few light swingers), all preoccupied with the “moon” theme are essayed with care and tenderness by the smooth-toned crooner," adding: "The accompaniment is naturally strings, adding up to a pleasant romantic mood." They called it a "pleasant excursion for Vale." Speaking on the reissue, Record World said: "Col has repackaged this collection of moon-struck songs and brings them happily to the public again," noting that "Jerry, under Glenn Osser's direction, performs expertly."

Reissued in 1999 in a two-fer CD by Collectables Records alongside It's Magic (1966) by Vale, AllMusic's editors gave the album a three-star rating.

== Chart performance and singles ==
The Same Old Moon missed the charts after its release. Moonlight Becomes You, though, managed to chart. The album debuted on the US Record World 100 Top LP's chart in the issue dated September 25, 1965, peaking at No. 97. Moonlight Becomes You entered the Canadian RPM GMP Guide chart in the issue dated August 2, 1965, reaching No. 13 during a three-week run on it.

"The Moon Is My Pillow" originally formed the B-side for Vale's 1959 single "The Flame". "No Moon at All" later formed the B-side for Vale's 1960 single "Making Believe You're Here". Both songs did not chart.

== Track listing ==
Side one
No.	Title	Writer(s)	Length
1.	"The Same Old Moon"	M. Drake-Fisch	3:25
2.	"Magic Is the Moonlight"	Pasquale; Grever	2:40
3.	"In the Chapel in the Moonlight"	Billy Hill	3:13
4.	"Moonlight Becomes You"	Johnny Burke; Jimmy Van Heusen	3:35
5.	"Give Me the Moonlight, Give Me the Girl (And Leave the Rest to Me)"	Lew Brown; Albert Von Tilzer	3:15
6.	"A Strawberry Moon (In a Blueberry Sky)"	Jack Hilliard; S. Mysels	2:15
Total length:			19:05

Side two
No.	Title	Writer(s)	Length
1.	"The Moon Is My Pillow"	Manning; Lytell	2:33
2.	"Heaven Drops Her Curtain Down"	G. Mysels; S. Mysels	2:42
3.	"How High the Moon"	Nancy Hamilton; M. Lewis	3:15
4.	"This Is the Night"	Redd Evans; Bellin	3:00
5.	"No Moon at All"	David Mann; Redd Evans	3:20
6.	"Moonglow"	Will Hudson; Eddie DeLange; Irving Mills	3:10
Total length:			18:30

== Charts ==
Chart peaks for Moonlight Becomes You
Chart (1965)	Peak position
US Record World 100 Top LP's	97
Canada RPM GMP Guide	13

== Personnel ==
All credits are adapted from the liner notes of The Same Old Moon.

- Jerry Vale – lead vocals
- Glen Osser – arranger, conductor
- Henry Parker – photography (reissue cover)
