= Let It Be (Jerry Vale album) =

Studio album by Jerry Vale
- Released: April 29, 1970
- Genre: Pop
- Length: 35:00
- Labels: Columbia; CS-1021
- Producer: Wally Gold

Jerry Vale chronology
Jerry Vale Sings 16 Greatest Hits of the 60's (1970)	Let It Be (1970)	Hey Look Me Over (1970)

Let It Be is a studio album by American singer and actor Jerry Vale released in early 1970 by Columbia Records. The album consists mainly of contemporary pop hits across 12 tracks. It received a positive critical reception, with Vale noted for his handling of the newer songs, and eventually the album reached No. 189 Billboard Top LP's chart.

== Critical reception ==
The album received a positive critical reception upon its release. Billboard put the album in its "Pop Spotlight Picks" section, writing: "Jerry Vale moves into the contemporary bag with ease and slick professionalism," adding "in this package he takes songs from the Beatles, Simon & Garfunkel and David & Bacharach in his stride and makes them work for him." They highlighted an additional 5 songs as well. Cashbox in its "Pop Best Bets" reviews stated that "Jerry Vale has gone prospecting and mined a rich load of recent top ten gold," believing that "The chanter's many fans will be on line for this one."

== Chart performance and singles ==
The album debuted on the Billboard magazine's Top LP's chart in the issue dated June 27, 1970, climbing to No. 189 during a four-week stay on it.

"Stay Awhile" was released as the lead single in November 1969 backed by "It's All in the Game". The song reached the top-40 on America's Billboard Easy Listening chart, rising to the number 27 position during it a four-week run on the chart in February–March 1970.

== Track listing ==
Side one
No.	Title	Writer(s)	Length
1.	"Easy Come, Easy Go"	Jack Keller; Diane Hildebrand	2:18
2.	"Let It Be"	John Lennon; Paul McCartney	3:43
3.	"I'll Never Fall in Love Again"	Burt Bacharach; Hal David	3:03
4.	"All I Have to Do Is Dream"	Boudleaux Bryant	2:40
5.	"Raindrops Keep Fallin' on My Head"	Burt Bacharach; Hal David	2:37
6.	"Jean"	Rod McKuen	3:07
Total length:			17:28

Side two
No.	Title	Writer(s)	Length
1.	"Love Grows (Where My Rosemary Goes)"	Barry Mason; Tony Macaulay	2:24
2.	"Bridge Over Troubled Water"	Paul Simon	5:23
3.	"Leaving on a Jet Plane"	John Denver	3:36
4.	"Something"	George Harrison	2:55
5.	"Stay Awhile"	Geoff Stephens; Les Reed	3:14
Total length:			17:32

== Charts ==
Chart peaks for Let It Be
Chart (1970)	Peak position
US Billboard Top LP's	189

== Personnel ==
All credits are adapted from the liner notes of Let It Be.

- Jerry Vale – lead vocals
- Wally Gold – producer
- Joe Gardner – arranger, conductor
- Don Meehan – engineer
- Stan Tonkel – engineer
- Don Hunstein – photography
