= Be My Love (disambiguation) =

Be My Love is a song popularized by Mario Lanza.

Be My Love may also refer to:

- Be My Love, album by Plácido Domingo
- Be My Love, album by Joseph Calleja
- Be My Love (Jerry Vale album), 1964
- "Be My Love", a song by Exo-CBX, a sub-unit of the South Korean boy band Exo
