= I Have But One Heart (album) =

Studio album by Jerry Vale
- Released: June 1962
- Genre: Traditional pop
- Length: 36:28
- Labels: Columbia; CS-8597/CL-1797
- Producer: Robert Morgan

Jerry Vale chronology
The Same Old Moon (1959)	I Have But One Heart (1962)	Arrivederci, Roma (1963)

I Have But One Heart subtitled Sings Great Italian Love Songs is a studio album by American singer and actor Jerry Vale released in mid 1962 by Columbia Records. The album consists mainly of traditional pop Italian standards across 12 tracks. The album was a commercial success and reached No. 60 on the Billboard chart and No. 48 on the Cashbox chart.

== Critical reception ==
The album received a positive critical reception upon its release. Cashbox in its album reviews stated that "Warm Italian melodies have always been a popular subject for albums and Jerry Vale’s rich, full-bodied voice is perfectly suited to the dozen romantic ballads on this first-rate Columbia offering." They added, "Kudos go to Glenn Osser for a superlative backing of strings."

Reissued in 2002 in a two-fer CD by Collectables Records alongside Arrivederci, Roma (1963) by Vale, Al Campbell from AllMusic described the both albums as "[capturing] Vale's beautiful renditions of romantic Italian love songs sung in his high tenor voice" with each containing "great sound quality to boot".

== Chart performance and singles ==
I Have But One Heart was the first Vale album to reach the Billboard and Cashbox, starting a streak of charting albums for Vale. The album debuted on Billboard magazine's Top LP's chart in the issue dated August 25, 1962, peaking at No. 60 during a forty-eight-week run on the chart. It entered Cashbox magazine's Top 50 Stereo albums chart on September 20, 1963, peaking at No. 48 during its one-week stay on it.

== Track listing ==
Side one
No.	Title	Writer(s)	Length
1.	"O Sole Mio (My Sunshine)"	Di Capua; Alfredo Mazzucchi	2:43
2.	"Roman Guitar (Chitarra Romana)"	C. Bruno; E. Di Lazzaro; M. Harper	3:52
3.	"Just Say I Love Her (Dicitencello Vuie)"	Roberto Falvo; J. Dale; Michele Galdieri; M. Kalmanoff; Salvatore Ward	3:58
4.	"Mala Femmina"	Totò	2:33
5.	"Tell Me That You Love Me (Parlami D'Amore, Mariù)"	Al Stillman; C.A. Bixio	2:43
6.	"Return To Me (Ritorna A Me)"	Lombardo; Danny Di Minno	3:14
Total length:			18:23

Side two
No.	Title	Writer(s)	Length
1.	"Mama (Mamma)"	B. Cherubini; C.A. Bixio; H. Barlow; P. Brito	3:35
2.	"You Alone"	Al Stillman; Robert Allen	3:04
3.	"I Can't Get You Out Of My Heart (Ti Amo Ti Voglio Amor)"	Danny Di Minno; J. Clowes	2:44
4.	"(Oh My Wonderful One) Tell Me You're Mine (Per Un Bacio D'Amor)"	Domenico Ravasino; Renato Fradianelli	2:49
5.	"I Have But One Heart (O Marenariello)"	Johnny Farrow; W. Symes	3:01
6.	"Come Back To Sorrento (Torna A Surriento)"	E. De Curtis	2:52
Total length:			18:05

== Charts ==
Chart peaks for I Have But One Heart
Chart (1962)	Peak position
US Billboard Top LP's	60
US Cashbox Top 50 Stereo	48

== Personnel ==
All credits are adapted from the liner notes of I Have But One Heart.

- Jerry Vale – lead vocals
- Glen Osser – arranger, conductor
- Robert Morgan – producer
- Henry Parker – photography
