= This Guy's in Love with You (album) =

Studio album by Jerry Vale
- Released: June 1968 (US); September 1968 (CAN)
- Genres: Pop, easy listening
- Length: 36:31
- Labels: Columbia; CS-9694
- Producers: Mike Berniker, Wally Gold

Jerry Vale chronology
I Hear a Rhapsody (1968)	This Guy's in Love with You (1968)	Till (1969)

Singles from This Guy's in Love with You
- 1. "Don't Tell My Heart to Stop Loving You" Released: January 1968; 2. "With Pen in Hand" Released: June 1968

This Guy's in Love with You is a studio album by American singer and actor Jerry Vale released in mid 1968 by Columbia Records. The album consisted mainly of recent pop hits, containing a total of 11 tracks split on two sides. Two singles were included as well, "Don't Tell My Heart to Stop Loving You", which was a big easy listening in early 1968, and "With Pen in Hand", which was released alongside and highlited on the album in June 1968. This Guy's in Love with You received a positive critical reception and reached the US album charts. Results were published by Billboard, Cashbox, and Record World. Chart positions varied from number 135 to number 100.

== Release ==
This Guy's in Love with You was released by Columbia Records in June 1968 in the US. It was Vale's twenty-first studio album released in his career. The label distributed it as a vinyl LP, with five songs on "side A" and six songs on "side B". In Canada, the album was released on this format in September 1968. It was also released as an 8-track cartridge and an 4-track cartridge by August 1968, as well as a reel-to-reel later that year. Decades later, the album was re-released on Sony Music Entertainment to digital and streaming sites.

== Content and reception ==
This Guy's in Love with You consisted of 11 tracks in total. Unlike some of Vale's previous albums, it contains no original material. Instead, Columbia had him cover popular country and pop songs. Three songs, "Do You Know the Way to San Jose", "This Guy's in Love with You", and "The Look of Love" were written by songwriting duo Burt Bacharach & Hal David, and were hits for various singers and bands. "Honey" and "With Pen in Hand" were hits for Bobby Goldsboro during this time, and "By the Time I Get to Phoenix" was a hit for Glen Campbell the previous year.

The album received a positive critical reception upon its release. Putting the album in their "Pick Hits" section, Record World called the three Bacharach-David songs a "wise move." Cashbox said that "This set should do quite well for the veteran songster." Billboard stated that "This is one of Vale's most potent album offerings," adding that Vale "takes [the songs] on with assurance end ease." The Plain Dealer said that Vale did the ballads with "ingratiating, romanticized feeling."

== Chart performance and singles ==
The album debuted on Billboard magazine's Top LP's chart in the issue dated August 10, 1968, peaking at No. 135 during a twenty-week run on the chart. The album entered Cashbox magazine's Top 100 Albums chart in the issue dated July 27, 1968, reaching No. 100 during its brief one-week appearance on it. It entered the Record World 100 Top LP's chart in the issue dated August 3, 1968, peaking at No. 102 in early August 1968 during a five-week run on the chart.

"Don't Tell My Heart to Stop Loving You" was released as a single in January 1967 backed by "When I'm With You". It became a top-10 single on America's Billboard Easy Listening chart, rising to the number 6 position. "Don't Tell My Heart to Stop Loving You" became Vale's final top-10 hit on the Easy Listening chart. "With Pen in Hand" was released the same month as the album, only rising to the number 30 position the Billboard Easy Listening chart.

== Track listing ==
Side one
No.	Title	Writer(s)	Length
1.	"This Guy's in Love with You"	Burt Bacharach; Hal David	3:05
2.	"A Man Without Love"	Barry Mason; Roberto Livraghi; Mario Panzeri; Daniele Pace	3:31
3.	"Honey (I Miss You)"	Bobby Russell	4:00
4.	"Do You Know the Way to San Jose"	Burt Bacharach; Hal David	2:42
5.	"The Look of Love"	Burt Bacharach; Hal David	3:27
6.	"Young Girl"	Jerry Fuller	3:06
Total length:			19:51

Side two
No.	Title	Writer(s)	Length
1.	"With Pen in Hand"	Bobby Goldsboro	3:20
2.	"Can't Take My Eyes Off You"	Bob Crewe; Bob Gaudio	3:25
3.	"By the Time I Get to Phoenix"	Jimmy Webb	3:34
4.	"She Gives Me Love (La, La, La)"	Manuel de la Calva; Michael Julien; Ramón Arcusa	3:07
5.	"Don't Tell My Heart to Stop Loving You"	Claude Carrère; Jacques Plante	3:14
Total length:			16:40

== Charts ==
Chart peaks for This Guy's in Love with You
Chart (1968)	Peak position
US Billboard Top LP's	135
US Cashbox Top 100 Albums	100
US Record World LP's Coming Up	102

== Personnel ==
All credits are adapted from the liner notes of This Guy's in Love with You.

- Jerry Vale – lead vocals
- Jimmy Wisner – arranger, conductor
- Joe Gardner – arranger, conductor (tracks A2, A4, B3, B4)
- Don Meehan – engineer
- Frank Laico – engineer
- Fred Catero – engineer
- Don Hunstein – cover photography in Columbia Records Photo Studio
- Mike Berniker – producer (track B5)
- Wally Gold – producer (tracks A1, A3, A5, A6, B1, B2)
- Thomas Railaigh – sleeve notes
