= Standing Ovation at Carnegie Hall =

Live album by Jerry Vale
- Released: January 1965
- Recorded: May 1964, Carnegie Hall (New York City, NY)
- Genres: Traditional pop; Vocal pop
- Length: 34 minutes 17 seconds
- Labels: Columbia; CL 2273; CS 9073
- Producer: Ernie Altschuler

Jerry Vale chronology
Christmas Greetings from Jerry Vale (1964)	Standing Ovation at Carnegie Hall (1965)	Have You Looked into Your Heart (1965)

Standing Ovation at Carnegie Hall is the first and only live album by American-Italian singer Jerry Vale, released in January 1965 by Columbia Records. Vale sang a mix of English and foreign standards with a few contemporary hits. It was met with a mostly positive critical reception and saw commercial success.

== Background ==
By 1965 Vale had six-consecutive hit albums, and had been performing often on shows like The Ed Sullivan Show and The Tonight Show, and in venues like the Copacabana and Carnegie Hall. His performances were received well, with music critics like John S. Wilson writing that Vale was a singer in a "highly gimmick-conscious field" who had "hit on an astoundingly simple and effective gimmick." According to S. Wilson, he possessed "a warm, direct and lyrical voice projected with complete honesty and lack of pretension."

== Recording and content ==
So with all that Vale went to Carnegie Hall in May 1964, for a live album recording. It contained a total of 12 tracks, with them being split into six on side one, and six on side two. The album had a variety of songs. It included old American standards like "If I Had You" and "Baby Won't You Please Come Home, Spanish standards like "Granada", and show tunes such as, "The Song Is You" and "With a Song in My Heart" as well. It also had the Grammy winning "I Left My Heart in San Francisco", and contained an Italian medley, as he was known for singing many Italian standards. The album was produced by Ernie Altschuler and the orchestra was under the direction of Glenn Osser.

== Critical reception ==
Professional ratings
Review scores
Source	Rating
AllMusic	3/5 stars
Billboard	Positive (Spotlight)
Cashbox	Positive (Pop Picks)

Standing Ovation at Carnegie Hall was given a positive critical response following its release, and Vale was noted for his vocal abilities. Billboard magazine stated that the "Jerry Vale is riding one of his hottest streaks in singles and albums and this set will carry him even higher up the ladder." Continuing "...he puts out with vocal fervor on such wide-ranged songs as 'Hey, Look Me Over' to 'O' Sole Mio.'". Cashbox magazine noted that it's the first live recording of a Jerry Vale performance, taped live at Carnegie Hall, stating that "the songster displays a presence of style seldom captured in a studio session. The crooner's versatility comes through in a series of ballads, bouncers, and Italian favorites. Shining cuts include: 'Granada,' 'I’m Always Chasing Rainbows,' and an Italian medley with Vale’s hit 'Mala Femina.' This platter has much definitely airworthy material, and should be well received by his adult and teen audience. Certain hitsville disk" It was given a three-star rating by AllMusic as well.

== Release and chart performance ==
Standing Ovation at Carnegie Hall was released by Columbia Records in January 1965 and was the only live album of his career. The album was offered as a vinyl LP, available in both mono and stereo. An extended play version of the album was also released to music operators around the country as well. The album did not have any single releases. It debuted on Billboard magazine's Top LP's chart in the issue dated January 30, 1965, peaking at No. 55 during an eighteen-week run on the chart. The album debuted on Cashbox magazine's Top 100 Albums chart in the issue dated January 30, 1965, peaking at No. 25 during a fourteen-week run on the chart. It debuted on Record World magazine's 100 Top LP's chart in the issue dated January 30, 1965 as well, peaking at No. 22 during a fourteen-week run on the chart.

== Track listing ==
Side One
No.	Title	Writer(s)	Length
1.	"Hey, Look Me Over" (from the Broadway Musical: Wildcat)	Cy Coleman; Carolyn Leigh	2:04
2.	"Lulu's Back in Town"	Al Dubin; Harry Warren	2:03
3.	"With a Song in My Heart"	Richard Rodgers; Lorenz Hart	2:30
4.	"Baby Won't You Please Come Home"	Charles Warfield; Clarence Williams	1:25
5.	"I Left My Heart in San Francisco"	George Cory; Douglass Cross	3:28
6.	"Medley: 'O Sole Mio, Mala Femmina, Mamma"	Multiple	7:37

Side Two
No.	Title	Writer(s)	Length
1.	"I Feel a Song Comin' On"	Jimmy McHugh	1:20
2.	"The Song Is You"	Buddy Kaye; Jimmy McHugh	1:55
3.	"If I Had You"	Jerome Kern; Oscar Hammerstein II	2:39
4.	"Granada"	Agustín Lara; Dorothy Dodd	3:09
5.	"I'm Always Chasing Rainbows"	Harry Carroll; Joseph McCarthy	3:10
6.	"Lonesome Road"	Nathaniel Shilkret; Gene Austin	2:54
Total length:			34:17

== Chart performance ==
Chart performance for Standing Ovation at Carnegie Hall
Chart (1965)	Peak position
US Billboard Top LPs	55
US Cashbox Top 100 Albums	25
US Record World 100 Top LP's	22

== Personnel ==
- Producer – Ernie Altschuler
- Orchestra Director – Glenn Osser
- Photograph – Henry Parker
- Production Coordinator – Bob Hughes
