= You Don't Have to Say You Love Me (Jerry Vale album) =

Studio album by Jerry Vale
- Released: January 1968
- Genre: Traditional pop
- Length: 26:28
- Labels: Columbia; CL-2774; CS-9574
- Producer: Mike Berniker

Jerry Vale chronology
Time Alone Will Tell and Other Great Hits of Today (1967)	You Don't Have to Say You Love Me (1968)	I Hear a Rhapsody (1968)

You Don't Have to Say You Love Me is a studio album by American singer and actor Jerry Vale released in early 1968 by Columbia Records. The album consisted mainly of songs of recent pop hits, as well as three new tracks, containing a total of 11 tracks. Unlike with his previous album, no singles were taken from it. You Don't Have to Say You Love Me received a positive reception and reached the US album charts. Results were published by Billboard, with a peak position of No. 163.

== Background and recording ==
Jerry Vale had been a recording artist for Columbia since the 1950s, recording several pop hits and albums. In the early 1960s, Vale achieved major commercial success via his albums featuring English and Italian standards. Vale would record a mix of new and old songs for You Don't Have to Say You Love Me. The title track itself was the English version of "Lo che non vivo (senza te)", an entry for the Sanremo Music Festival held in Italy. Like his previous releases, the album was produced by Mike Berniker with arrangements and orchestra conduction by Marty Manning.

== Content and reception ==
You Don't Have to Say You Love Me consisted of 11 tracks in total. Three songs were originals, "You Have to Believe in Someone", "Lover's Roulette", and "Yellow Days". One song, "Till There Was You" was from a musical, "To Each His Own" was the title-track for its movie, and "Eternally" was a Charlie Chaplin song for his 1952 film Limelight. "What a Wonderful World" achieved peak popularity after the album was released, making chart appearances in April 1968. "Release Me" was a country hit in 1949 and later revived in 1967, while "There's a Kind of Hush (All Over the World)" was a pop hit in 1967.

Reviewing the album, Billboard stated that "Jerry Vale's style is to drench you with sofa-soft sounds, elegance and a sense of musical pageantry," believing that "In his latest effort, he succeeds again." The magazine said that "His voice is rich enough to lather, and the deep silky sounds of 'Release Me,' 'Kind of a Hush' and 'Ebb Tide' are romanced with the concert-style fullness that Vale's fans will applaud." Cashbox magazine similarly wrote that "Vale lends his smooth tenor voice to eleven love ballads on his latest album venture. Performing each selection with polished professionalism, the chanter conjures up a dreamy romantic spell that should work on his many fans."

== Chart performance ==
You Don't Have to Say You Love Me debuted on Billboard magazine's Top LP's chart in the issue dated March 16, 1968, peaking at No. 163 during a seven-week run on the chart. However, the album missed the Cashbox charts.

== Track listing ==
Side one
No.	Title	Writer(s)	Length
1.	"You Don't Have to Say You Love Me"	Pino Donaggio; Simon Napier-Bell; Vicki Wickham; Vito Pallavicini	2:42
2.	"Lover's Roulette"	C. Edmonds; J. Thompson; P. R. Arenas	2:43
3.	"Eternally"	Charlie Chaplin; Geoffrey Parsons	2:14
4.	"Yellow Days"	Alan Bernstein; Álvaro Carrillo	2:59
5.	"Release Me"	Eddie Miller; Robert Yount; W. S. Stevenson	2:53
Total length:			13:31

Side two
No.	Title	Writer(s)	Length
1.	"What a Wonderful World"	George David Weiss; George Douglas	2:36
2.	"There's a Kind of Hush (All Over the World)"	Geoff Stephens; Les Reed	2:42
3.	"To Each His Own"	Jay Livingston; Ray Evans	2:22
4.	"Ebb Tide"	Carl Sigman; Robert Maxwell	2:37
5.	"Till There Was You" (from The Music Man)	Meredith Willson	2:26
6.	"You Have to Believe in Someone"	Al Frisch; Richard Mullan	2:14
Total length:			12:57

== Charts ==
Chart peaks for You Don't Have to Say You Love Me
Chart (1968)	Peak position
US Billboard Top LP's	163

== Personnel ==
All credits are adapted from the liner notes of You Don't Have to Say You Love Me.

- Jerry Vale – lead vocals
- Marty Manning – arranger, conductor
- Sandy Speiser – photography
- Mike Berniker – producer
