= Be My Love (Jerry Vale album) =

Studio album by Jerry Vale
- Released: August 1964
- Genre: Pop
- Length: 32:28
- Labels: Columbia; CS-8981/CL-2181
- Producer: Mike Berniker

Jerry Vale chronology
Till the End of Time and Other Great Love Themes (1964)	Be My Love (1964)	Christmas Greetings from Jerry Vale (1964)

Be My Love is a studio album by American singer and actor Jerry Vale released in mid 1964 by Columbia Records. The album consists mainly of traditional pop standards across 12 tracks. It received positive reviews and reached No. 26 on the Billboard chart, No. 31 on the Cashbox chart and No. 22 on the Record World chart.

== Critical reception ==
Cashbox in its "Pop Picks" reviews stated that "On this new Columbia LP, the rich-voiced songster essays a dozen all-time great romantic ballads backed by Glenn Osser-arranged and conducted ork. Vale's straightforward, lyrical approach to these melodic greats is at all times rewarding," adding that "Heavy sales can be expected."

== Chart performance and singles ==
Be My Love was another of Vale's LPs to reach the top-40 on the US album charts. The album debuted on Billboard magazine's Top LP's chart in the issue dated August 29, 1964, peaking at No. 26 during a twenty-two-week run on the chart. It entered Cashbox magazine's Top 100 Monaural Albums chart in the issue also dated August 29, 1964, reaching No. 31 during its twenty weeks on the chart, while reaching No. 32 on the Top 50 Stereo chart during a shorter sixteen-week run on it. Be My Love entered the Record World 100 Top LP's chart in the issue dated September 5, 1964, peaking at No. 22 in October 1964 during a fifteen-week run on the chart.

== Track listing ==
Side one
No.	Title	Writer(s)	Length
1.	"Love Is a Many-Splendored Thing"	Paul Francis Webster; Sammy Fain	2:39
2.	"Because of You"	Arthur Hammerstein; Dudley Wilkinson	2:46
3.	"Unchained Melody"	Alex North; Hy Zaret	2:53
4.	"Because"	T. Eschemacher; D'Hardelot	2:18
5.	"Mona Lisa"	Jay Livingston–Ray Evans	3:07
6.	"Because You're Mine"	Nicholas Brodszky; Sammy Cahn	2:27
Total length:			16:10

Side two
No.	Title	Writer(s)	Length
1.	"Be My Love"	Nicholas Brodszky; Sammy Cahn	2:41
2.	"Why Don't You Believe Me"	King Laney; Lew Douglas; Roy Rodde	3:00
3.	"All the Way"	Cahn - Van Heusen	2:30
4.	"Too Young"	Sidney Lippman	2:07
5.	"Secret Love"	Paul Francis Webster; Sammy Fain	2:49
6.	"Vaya Con Dios"	Buddy Pepper; Inez James; Buddy Pepper	3:11
Total length:			16:18

== Charts ==
Chart peaks for Be My Love
Chart (1964)	Peak position
US Billboard Top LP's	26
US Cashbox Top 100 Monaural Albums	31
US Cashbox Top 50 Stereo	32
US Record World 100 Top LP's	22

== Personnel ==
All credits are adapted from the liner notes of Be My Love.

- Jerry Vale – lead vocals
- Glen Osser – arranger, conductor
- Mike Berniker – producer
- Henry Parker – photography
