= Till the End of Time and Other Great Love Themes =

Studio album by Jerry Vale
- Released: February 1964
- Genre: Pop
- Length: 31:41
- Labels: Columbia; CS-8916/CL-2161
- Producer: Mike Berniker

Jerry Vale chronology
The Language of Love (1963)	Till the End of Time and Other Great Love Themes (1964)	Be My Love (1964)

Singles from Till the End of Time and Other Great Love Themes
- 1. "On and On" Released: January 7, 1964

Till the End of Time and Other Great Love Themes is a studio album by American singer and actor Jerry Vale released in early 1964 by Columbia Records. The album consists mainly of traditional pop standards across 12 tracks. It received positive reviews and reached No. 28 on the Billboard chart and No. 19 on the Cashbox mono chart. The album had a lead single titled "On and On" as well.

== Critical reception ==
Cashbox in its "Pop Picks" reviews stated that "Jerry Vale has gone the Chartsville route with his last three Columbia LP's and this session is loaded with the same success ingredients and is sure to go the same path," adding that "The songster's rich and emotion-packed voice serves him well on these classics-oriented love themes."

== Chart performance and singles ==
Till the End of Time and Other Great Love Themes was another of Vale's LPs to reach the top-40 on the US album charts. The album debuted on Billboard magazine's Top LP's chart in the issue dated February 22, 1964, peaking at No. 28 during an eighteen-week run on the chart. It entered Cashbox magazine's Top 100 Monaural Albums chart in the issue dated February 29, 1964, reaching No. 19 during its twelve weeks on the chart, while reaching No. 16 on the Top 50 Stereo chart during a shorter nine-week run on it.

"On and On" was released as a single in January 1964, backed by the Peking theme "So Little Time". It made a one-week chart appearance on the Billboard Bubbling Under the Hot 100 at No. 123.

== Track listing ==
Side one
No.	Title	Writer(s)	Length
1.	"Till the End of Time" (Composed by [Based on "Polonaise"] – Chopin)	Buddy Kaye; Ted Mossman	2:23
2.	"My Reverie" (Composed by [Based on "Reverie"] – Debussy)	Larry Clinton	3:17
3.	"Full Moon and Empty Arms" (Composed by [Based on Piano Concerto No. 2] – Rachmaninoff)	Buddy Kaye; Ted Mossman	2:38
4.	"This Day of Days" (Composed by [Adapted from "Étude No. 3"] – Chopin)	Ray Gilbert	2:22
5.	"The Things I Love" (Composed by [Adapted from "Melody, Op. 42, No. 3"] – Tchaikovsky)	Harold Barlow; Harry Harris	3:26
6.	"Moon Love" (Composed by [Adapted from "Symphony No. 5, 2nd Movement"] – Tchaikovsky)	André Kostelanetz; Mack Davis	2:54
Total length:			16:50

Side two
No.	Title	Writer(s)	Length
1.	"Don't You Know?" (Composed by [Based on "Musetta's Waltz"] – Puccini)	Bobby Worth	2:28
2.	"The Story of a Starry Night" (Composed by [Adapted from "Pathétique" Symphony] – Tchaikovsky)	Al Hoffman; Jerry Livingston; Mann Curtis	2:18
3.	"To Love Again" (Composed by [Based on "Nocturne in E-flat"] – Chopin)	George Sidney; Morris Stoloff; Ned Washington	2:40
4.	"So Near...Yet So Far" (Composed by [Adapted from "Liebestraum"] – Liszt)	Ray Gilbert	2:48
5.	"My Heart Reminds Me"	Paul Siegel; Al Stillman; Camillo Bargoni	2:23
6.	"On and On" (Composed by [Adapted from "Barcarolle"] – Offenbach)	Ray Gilbert	2:24
Total length:			14:51

== Charts ==
Chart peaks for Till the End of Time and Other Great Love Themes
Chart (1964)	Peak position
US Billboard Top LP's	28
US Cashbox Top 100 Monaural Albums	19
US Cashbox Top 50 Stereo	16

== Personnel ==
All credits are adapted from the liner notes of Till the End of Time and Other Great Love Themes.

- Jerry Vale – lead vocals
- Glen Osser – arranger, conductor
- Mike Berniker – producer
- Frank Bez – photography
