= I Live Each Day =

Single by Jerry Vale
- B-side: "The Ghost in the Wine"
- Released: March 1954
- Genre: Traditional pop
- Length: 2:25
- Label: Columbia; 4-40201
- Songwriter: Paul Insetta

Jerry Vale singles chronology
"Two Purple Shadows" (1953)	"I Live Each Day" (1954)	"Go" (1954)

Professional ratings
Review scores
Source	Rating
Billboard	78/100
Cashbox	A (Pick of the Week)

"I Live Each Day" is a song written by Paul Insetta and most notably performed by Jerry Vale, who released it as a single for Columbia Records in early 1954, with a positive reception and a moderate chart presence. The song was included in Vale's compilation albums thereafter.

== Jerry Vale version ==
=== Background and release ===
Jerry Vale was first noticed by Columbia Records' Guy Mitchell in the early 1950s, after which Vale began recording for the record label. Columbia released his "I Live Each Day" in March 1954. It was backed by a song with a "slow waltz tempo," "The Ghost in the Wine" on the B-side, which was a non-album release. Jimmy Carroll conducted and arranged the chorus and orchestra on side one. "I Live Each Day" was written by Paul Insetta, road manager for the aforementioned singer Guy Mitchell. A free copy of the single was also offered to jukebox operators as a special commemorative anniversary record as part of a promotional campaign.

=== Critical reception ===
The single was met with a positive critical reception upon its release. Cashbox reviewed the single in mid-February and classified it as a "Disk of the week", giving it an A grade. They stated that "is the pretty love tune that the crooner delivers with Jimmy Carroll's ork and chorus supporting", adding that the "Number is given a sincere and polished reading." Billboard magazine gave the single a positive review and a rating of 78 as well, saying that Vale "handles the tuneful ballad in a relaxed and suave performance," saying that "It is mighty easy to listen to and should be enjoyed by a good many fans."

=== Chart performance ===
"I Live Each Day" was the third of seven hits Vale had in the 1950s. It debuted on the Billboard Coming Up in the Trade/The Disk Jockeys Pick on April 17, 1954, reaching No. 29 before dropping out.

=== Track listing ===
7" single (Columbia 4-40201, 1954)
No.	Title	Writer(s)	Performance rights handled by	Length
1.	"I Live Each Day"	Paul Insetta	ASCAP	2:25
2.	"The Ghost in the Wine"	Gallop; Wayne	ASCAP	2:30

== Charts ==
Chart performance for "I Live Each Day"
Chart (1954)	Peak position
US Billboard Pop: The Disk Jockeys Pick	29
