= There Goes My Heart (album) =

Studio album by Jerry Vale
- Released: August 1965
- Genre: Traditional pop
- Length: 28:10
- Labels: Columbia; CS-9187/CL-2387
- Producer: Ernie Altschuler

Jerry Vale chronology
Have You Looked into Your Heart (1965)	There Goes My Heart (1965)	It's Magic (1966)

There Goes My Heart is a studio album by American singer and actor Jerry Vale released in mid 1965 by Columbia Records. The album consists mainly of traditional pop standards across 12 tracks. It received a positive reception and in the US it reached No. 42 on the Billboard chart, No. 70 on the Cashbox, and No. 86 on the Record World chart. The album also marked Vale's first album to chart in Canada, at No. 7.

== Critical reception ==
The album received a positive critical reception upon its release. Billboard put the album in its "Spotlight Pick" section, writing: "The smooth, romantic voice of Vale blends beautifully with the lush string arrangement of Marty Manning on a clever programming idea based upon losers in love." The publication highlighted "There Must Be a Way" among the "standouts." Cashbox in its "Pop Picks" reviews stated that Vale "packs [the album] with easy-to-listen-to versions of golden sounds from way back in the past," highlighting: "Just One More Chance" and "Somebody Else Is Taking My Place."

== Chart performance ==
There Goes My Heart was the first of Vale's LPs to miss the top-40 on the US album charts during a string of commercially successful albums starting from 1962, but it marked his first charting album in Canada, making the top-10 there. The album debuted on Billboard magazine's Top LP's chart in the issue dated October 16, 1965, peaking at No. 42 during a seventeen-week run on the chart. It entered Cashbox magazine's Top 100 Monaural Albums chart in the issue dated September 25, 1965, reaching No. 70 during its seven weeks on the chart. The album debuted on the Record World 100 Top LP's chart in the issue dated October 2, 1965, climbing to No. 86 during also a seven-week stay on it. There Goes My Heart entered the Canadian RPM GMP Guide chart in the issue dated October 25, 1965, reaching No. 7 during a five-week run on it.

== Track listing ==
Side one
No.	Title	Writer(s)	Length
1.	"There Goes My Heart"	Abner Silver; Benny Davis	2:22
2.	"Just One More Chance"	Arthur Johnston; Sam Coslow	2:04
3.	"There Must Be a Way"	David Saxon; Robert Cook; Sammy Gallop	2:05
4.	"Sogni D'Oro"	Alan Bergman; Lew Spence; Marilyn Keith	2:28
5.	"I Understand"	Kim Gannon; Mabel Wayne	2:21
6.	"Can't You See I'm Sorry"	Charlotte McCarthy	2:31
Total length:			13:51

Side two
No.	Title	Writer(s)	Length
1.	"Without Saying a Word"	S. Lee; Gino Mescoli; Primo Delcomune	2:11
2.	"No One Will Ever Know"	Fred Rose; Mel Foree	2:39
3.	"Somebody Else Is Taking My Place"	Dick Howard; Bob Ellsworth; Russ Morgan	2:13
4.	"One More Blessing"	Danny Di Minno; George Cardini	2:32
5.	"You Were Mine for a While"	Jerry Freeman; Johnny Hicks	2:32
6.	"I Can't Help It"	Hank Williams	2:12
Total length:			14:19

== Charts ==
Chart peaks for There Goes My Heart
Chart (1965)	Peak position
US Billboard Top LP's	42
US Cashbox Top 100 Albums	70
US Record World 100 Top LP's	86
Canada RPM GMP Guide	7

== Personnel ==
All credits are adapted from the liner notes of There Goes My Heart.

- Jerry Vale – lead vocals
- Marty Manning – arranger, conductor
- Ernie Altschuler – producer
- Henry Parker – photography
- Mort Goode – liner notes
