= Great Moments on Broadway =

Studio album by Jerry Vale
- Released: April 1966
- Genre: Pop
- Length: 31:03
- Labels: Columbia; S-9289 (Stereo)/CL-2489 (Monaural)
- Producer: Ernie Altschuler

Jerry Vale chronology
It's Magic (1966)	Great Moments on Broadway (1966)	Sings Everybody Loves Somebody and Other Hits (1966)

Great Moments on Broadway is a Broadway-themed studio album by American singer and actor Jerry Vale released in early 1966 by Columbia Records. The album received a positive critical reception and reached the US album charts. Results were published by the three major music industry magazines at the time, Billboard, Cashbox, and Record World.

== Critical reception ==
The album received a positive critical reception upon its release. Billboard put the album in its "Spotlight Pick" section, writing that "Exceptional musical moments from the Broadway stage are enriched by the vocal performance of Vale and sparkling new arrangements from the pen of Marty Manning." Record World said "Only the best of Broadway was tapped for this new Jerry Vale album," calling it a "Hot ticket." RPM stated that "Jerry Vale comes up with another great album release," adding that Vale "gives his very special treatment to some very special and great Broadway tunes including 'Sunrise Sunset', 'On A Clear Day', and 'Some Enchanted Evening'."

== Chart performance ==
The album debuted on Billboard magazine's Top LP's chart in the issue dated July 2, 1966, peaking at No. 111 during a four-week run on the chart. It entered Cashbox magazine's Top 100 Albums chart in the issue dated June 11, 1966, reaching No. 90 during its six weeks on the chart. Great Moments on Broadway entered the Record World 100 Top LP's chart in the issue also dated June 25, 1966, peaking at No. 95 in mid July 1966 during a five-week run on the chart.

== Track listing ==
Side one
No.	Title	Writer(s)	Length
1.	"What Kind of Fool Am I?"	Leslie Bricusse; Anthony Newley	2:45
2.	"On a Clear Day (You Can See Forever)"	Burton Lane; Alan Jay Lerner	2:35
3.	"Too Many Tomorrows"	Cy Coleman; Dorothy Fields	2:30
4.	"So in Love"	Cole Porter	2:30
5.	"If I Loved You"	Richard Rodgers; Oscar Hammerstein II	2:43
6.	"Maria"	Leonard Bernstein; Stephen Sondheim	2:58
Total length:			16:01

Side two
No.	Title	Writer(s)	Length
1.	"Camelot"	Alan Jay Lerner; Frederick Loewe	2:32
2.	"Sunrise, Sunset"	Jerry Bock; Sheldon Harnick	2:59
3.	"Stranger in Paradise"	Alexander Borodin; Robert Wright; George Forrest	3:10
4.	"On the Street Where You Live"	Frederick Loewe; Alan Jay Lerner	2:51
5.	"Some Enchanted Evening"	Richard Rodgers; Oscar Hammerstein II	3:30
Total length:			15:02

== Charts ==
Chart peaks for Great Moments on Broadway
Chart (1966)	Peak position
US Billboard Top LP's	111
US Cashbox Top 100 Albums	90
US Record World 100 Top LP's	95

== Personnel ==
All credits are adapted from the liner notes of Great Moments on Broadway.

- Jerry Vale – lead vocals
- Marty Manning – arranger, conductor
- Ernie Altschuler – producer
