= Christmas Greetings from Jerry Vale =

Studio album by Jerry Vale
- Released: September 1964
- Genre: Christmas
- Length: 32:35
- Labels: Columbia; CL-2225; CS-9025
- Producer: Ernie Altschuler

Jerry Vale chronology
Be My Love (1964)	Christmas Greetings from Jerry Vale (1964)	Standing Ovation at Carnegie Hall (1965)

Christmas Greetings from Jerry Vale is a Christmas-themed studio album by American singer and actor Jerry Vale released in late 1964 by Columbia Records. The album mainly included traditional Christmas standards and carols. It received positive reviews upon its release and reached the charts published by Billboard and Cashbox in 1964. It re-charted in 1965, 1967, and 1968 with varying success.

== Background, recording, and content ==
Jerry Vale had been a recording artist for Columbia since the early 1950s, recording several pop hits. In the early 1960s, Vale achieved major commercial success via his albums featuring English and Italian standards. In 1964, he cut a Christmas album, which was common for popular vocalists at the time. Christmas Greetings from Jerry Vale consisted of 12 tracks in total. On side one, the track listing mainly included popular Christmas songs from the 1940s and 1950s. These included songs that made the Billboard pop charts such as "White Christmas", "Blue Christmas", and "Have Yourself a Merry Little Christmas". Side two contained only Christmas carols, with "The First Noel" being a traditional tune. Like his previous releases, the album was produced by Ernie Altschuler with arrangements by Glenn Osser.

== Release and critical reception ==
The album was released in September 1964. Billboard stated that "Christmas is a holiday of warmth and deep feeling" and "Jerry Vale is a natural for conveying this atmosphere," noting that "His rich voice and sincere delivery is difficult to top." Cashbox magazine believed that "Backed by the ork and arrangements Glen Osser, the songster, essays the familiar old-day gems with his usual warmth," also saying that "heavy sales can be expected." The Hartford Courant stated that "pleasing tenor sings versatille Christmas salutations," believing Vale "sings some pretty ballads" and called the second side "tasteful."

== Chart performance annd singles ==
Christmas Greetings from Jerry Vale successfully reached the US Christmas LP's chart published by Billboard magazine on several years, omitted from their usual Billboard Top LP's chart because it was a holiday LP. It debuted in the issue dated December 19, 1964, peaking at No. 14 during a two-week run. Cashbox included holiday releases in their main pop charts; Christmas Greetings from Jerry Vale reached No. 109 on December 26, 1964. In 1965, it made a brief appearance on it at No. 51, and by 1966 it completely missed the chart. Though, in 1967, it again returned at No. 36 during its four-week stay on the chart that December. It made it final chart appearance in 1968, when it reached No. 56. One promotional single was released from the album in October 1965: "Blue Christmas".

== Track listing ==
Side one
No.	Title	Writer(s)	Length
1.	"Have Yourself a Merry Little Christmas"	Hugh Martin; Ralph Blane	2:30
2.	"I'll Be Home for Christmas"	Walter Kent; Kim Gannon; Buck Ram	2:20
3.	"Blue Christmas"	Billy Hayes; Jay W. Johnson	2:30
4.	"Silver Bells"	Jay Livingston; Ray Evans	3:22
5.	"The Christmas Song"	Mel Tormé; Robert Wells	3:25
6.	"White Christmas"	Irving Berlin	2:57
Total length:			17:04

Side two
No.	Title	Writer(s)	Length
1.	"O Holy Night"	Adolphe Adam; John Sullivan Dwight	2:24
2.	"The First Noel"	Traditional	2:46
3.	"O Come, All Ye Faithful"	John Francis Wade	2:04
4.	"It Came Upon the Midnight Clear"	Edmund Sears; Richard Storrs Willis	2:26
5.	"O Little Town of Bethlehem"	Phillips Brooks; Lewis H. Redner	3:15
6.	"Silent Night"	Joseph Mohr; Franz Xaver Gruber	2:36
Total length:			15:31

== Charts ==
Chart peaks for Christmas Greetings from Jerry Vale
Chart (1964)	Peak position
US Billboard Christmas LP's	14
US Cashbox Looking Ahead Albums	109
Chart (1965)	Peak position
US Billboard Christmas LP's	51
Chart (1967)	Peak position
US Billboard Christmas LP's	36
Chart (1968)	Peak position
US Billboard Christmas LP's	56

== Personnel ==
All credits are adapted from the liner notes of Christmas Greetings from Jerry Vale.

- Jerry Vale – lead vocals
- Glenn Osser – arranger, conductor
- Frank Bez – photography
- Ernie Altschuler – producer
