= Two Purple Shadows =

Single by Jerry Vale
- B-side: "And This Is My Beloved"
- Released: December 1953
- Genre: Traditional pop
- Length: 2:37
- Label: Columbia; 4-40131
- Songwriters: Maurice Mysels; Sanford

Jerry Vale singles chronology
"For Me" (1953)	"Two Purple Shadows" (1953)	"I Live Each Day" (1954)

Professional ratings
Review scores
Source	Rating
Cashbox	B+ (Excellent)

"Two Purple Shadows" is a song written by songwriting duo Sanford-Mysels and most notably performed by Jerry Vale, who released it as a for Columbia Records in late 1953, with a positive reception and a moderate chart presence the following year. The song was included in Vale's compilation albums thereafter.

== Jerry Vale version ==
=== Background and release ===
Jerry Vale was first noticed by Columbia Records' Guy Mitchell in the early 1950s, after which Vale began recording for the records label. His first single for Columbia was scheduled to be "You Can Never Give Me Back My Heart". It was followed by more releases, but they did not chart. For the fifth single, Columbia scheduled aIt was backed by a ballad "Two Purple Shadows", backed by "And This Is My Beloved" from the 1953 musical Kismet, on the B-side, which was a non-album release. Percy Faith conducted and arranged the chorus and orchestra on side two, while for the first Jimmy Carroll directed it.

=== Critical reception ===
The single received a positive review upon its release. Cashbox reviewed the single in mid-December and classified it as a "excellent" record, giving it a B+ grade. They stated that "Jerry shows the fresh quality in his voice as he sends up his best job to date," adding that it's a "most beautiful song with a top-notch delivery" that could be a "big hit with help." They placed it among its "Best Bet" songs.

=== Chart performance ===
"Two Purple Shadows" was the second of seven hits Vale had in the 1950s. It debuted on the Billboard Coming Up in the Trade/The Disk Jockeys Pick in February, before reaching the chart at No. 20 in March.

=== Track listing ===
7" single (Columbia 4-40131, 1953)
No.	Title	Writer(s)	Performance rights handled by	Length
1.	"Two Purple Shadows"	Maurice Mysels; Sanford	ASCAP	2:30
2.	"And This Is My Beloved"	Robert Wright; George Forrest	ASCAP	2:25

== Charts ==
Chart performance for "Two Purple Shadows"
Chart (1954)	Peak position
US Billboard Pop: The Disk Jockeys Pick	20
