= Till (Jerry Vale album) =

Studio album by Jerry Vale
- Released: January 18, 1969
- Recorded: November 1968
- Studio: CBS 30th Street Studios
- Genres: Pop; Easy listening; Soft-rock
- Length: 35 minutes 10 seconds
- Labels: Columbia Records; CS 9757
- Producer: Wally Gold

Jerry Vale chronology
This Guy's in Love with You (1968)	Till (1969)	Where's the Playground Susie? (1969)

Professional ratings
Review scores
Source	Rating
AllMusic	3/5 stars
Cashbox	Positive (Pop Picks)
Record World	Positive (Pick Hits)

Till is a studio album by American singer Jerry Vale released in early 1969 by Columbia Records. Featuring several pop hits, the album became a commercial success soon after its release, and received positive contemporary and retrospective reviews.

== Overview ==
Till was the first of four albums that Vale released in 1969, with all four being released without accompanying singles. Produced by Wally Gold and arranged by Joe Gardner, the album featured covers of recent pop hits and the top contemporary songs of 1968, although it contained older hits like "Put Your Head on My Shoulder" and "My Special Angel", both of which were from the late 1950s. The final track in the album (Look Homeward Angel) would be written by Gold himself. For the album's promotion, Vale would go on many shows, notably The Ed Sullivan Show.

== Chart performance ==
The album debuted on Billboard magazine's Top LP's chart in the issue dated February 15, 1969, peaking at No. 90 during a twelve-week run on the chart. It debuted on Cashbox magazine's Top 100 Albums chart in the issue dated February 22, 1969, and was ranked much higher, peaking at No. 69 during a nine-week run on the chart. The album also entered Record World magazine's 100 Top LP's chart in the issue dated February 1, 1969, peaking at No. 90 during a five-week run on the chart. It would be his final album to reach the Top 100 on the charts.

== Critical reception ==
The album received a positive critical reception upon its release. The initial Record World review stated that "Jerry lets go here. His pipes have never been purer." Continuing, "Just listen to 'MacArthur Park' to get the full force." Also noting "Most of the songs on the package have been in the charts the past few months". Cashbox magazine wrote, "Jerry Vale lends his rich, warm voice to a strong selection of pop melodies", also noting that "The chanter's smooth, graceful delivery should gain the approval of his large following."

Retrospectively, Stephen Thomas Erlewine on AllMusic reviewed the album and stated, "As a pop artifact, it's priceless, simply because its sweeping strings, syrupy choirs and light folky guitars capture how directionless mainstream adult pop was at the turn of the decade", he would add that "As a Vale record, it isn't bad, but it's clear from his quavering voice and laissez-faire delivery that he either doesn't care for the songs or isn't quite sure how to sing them," but he noted that "the resulting soft-rock mishmash is actually quite entertaining".

== Track listing ==
Side One
No.	Title	Writer(s)	Length
1.	"Till"	Charles Danvers, Carl Sigman	2:18
2.	"Abraham, Martin and John"	Dick Holler	3:14
3.	"Little Green Apples"	Bobby Russell	3:22
4.	"Those Were the Days"	Gene Raskin	4:15
5.	"My Special Angel"	Jimmy Duncan	2:41
6.	"Promises, Promises"	Burt Bacharach, Hal David	2:56
Total length:			18:46

Side Two
No.	Title	Writer(s)	Length
7.	"I Love How You Love Me"	Barry Mann, Larry Kolber	2:27
8.	"Les Bicyclettes de Belsize"	Barry Mason, Les Reed	3:14
9.	"MacArthur Park"	Jimmy Webb	4:33
10.	"Put Your Head on My Shoulder"	Paul Anka	2:33
11.	"Look Homeward Angel"	Wally Gold	3:37
Total length:			16:24

== Charts ==
Weekly chart performance for Till
Chart (1969)	Peak position
US Billboard Top LPs	90
US Cashbox Top 100 Albums	69
US Record World 100 Top LP's	90

== Personnel ==
All credits are adapted from the liner notes of Till.

- Wally Gold – producer
- Joe Gardner – arranger, conductor
- Don Meehan – engineer
- Stan Tonkel – engineer
- Don Hunstein – photography
