= Where's the Playground Susie? =

Studio album by Jerry Vale
- Released: June 1969
- Genre: Pop
- Length: 34:09
- Labels: Columbia; CS-9838
- Producer: Wally Gold

Jerry Vale chronology
| Till (1969) | Where's the Playground Susie? (1969) | With Love, Jerry Vale (1969) |

Where's the Playground Susie? is a studio album by American singer and actor Jerry Vale released in mid 1969 by Columbia Records. The album consisted mainly of recent pop hits, containing a total of 11 tracks. The album received a positive critical reception and reached the US album charts. Results were published by Billboard, reaching No. 180. In a reissue years later, the album was retitled to My Way.

== Reception ==
Cashbox stated that "Singer Jerry Vale's devoted audience will be delighted with the artist's latest album, as the chanter delivers graceful, warm renditions of 11 pop tunes," adding: "Topnotch readings of the title song, 'Traces,' 'Happy Heart,' and 'My Way,' highlight the LP."

The album debuted on Billboard magazine's Top LP's chart in the issue dated July 5, 1969, peaking at No. 180 during a four-week run on the chart.

== Track listing ==
Side one
| No. | Title | Writer(s) | Length |
|---|---|---|---|
| 1. | "Traces" | Buddy Buie; Emory Gordy Jr.; James B. Cobb Jr. | 2:51 |
| 2. | "Seattle" | Ernie Sheldon; Hugo Montenegro; Jack Keller | 3:01 |
| 3. | "Where's the Playground Susie" | Jimmy Webb | 3:00 |
| 4. | "Galveston" | Jimmy Webb | 2:28 |
| 5. | "Let It Be Me" | Gilbert Bécaud; Mann Curtis; Pierre Delanoë | 3:19 |
| 6. | "Goodnight My Love" | George Motola; John S. Marascalco | 2:40 |
| Total length: | | | 17:19 |

Side two
| No. | Title | Writer(s) | Length |
|---|---|---|---|
| 1. | "Happy Heart" | Jackie Rae; James Last | 2:45 |
| 2. | "My Way" | Claude François; Gilles Thibaut; Jacques Revaux; Paul Anka | 4:23 |
| 3. | "The Way It Used to Be" | Corrado Conti; Franco Cassano; Gianni Argenio; Roger Cook; Roger Greenaway | 3:05 |
| 4. | "You Gave Me a Mountain" | Marty Robbins | 4:14 |
| 5. | "To Know You Is to Love You" | Phil Spector | 2:23 |
| Total length: | | | 16:50 |

== Charts ==
Chart peaks for Where's the Playground Susie?
| Chart (1969) | Peak position |
|---|---|
| US Billboard Top LP's | 180 |

== Personnel ==
All credits are adapted from the liner notes of Where's the Playground Susie?.

- Jerry Vale – lead vocals
- Joe Gardner – arranger, conductor
- Don Meehan – engineer
- Peter Romano – engineer
- Stan Tonkel – engineer
- Columbia Records Photo Studio – photography
- Don Hunstein – photography
- Wally Gold – producer
- Thomas Railaigh – sleeve notes
