= Time Alone Will Tell =

- Scandinavian release cover

Single by Connie Francis
- B-side: "Born Free"
- Released: March 1967
- Genre: Vocal
- Length: A-Side - 2:44; B-Side - 2:57
- Label: MGM; 13718
- Songwriters: Eros Sciorilli, Alberto Testa, Norman Newell
- Producer: Bob Morgan

Connie Francis singles chronology
"Another Page" (January 1967)	"Time Alone Will Tell" (1967)	"My Heart Cries for You" (July 1967)

"Time Alone Will Tell" is a song written by Eros Sciorilli, Alberto Testa, with English lyrics written by Norman Newell and was first released as a single by Connie Francis.

== Background ==
In 1967, between the 26th and 28th of January, the "17th Italian Song Festival", (the 17th annual Sanremo Music Festival, held at the Sanremo Casino in Sanremo) was held. The winners of the festival were Iva Zanicchi and Claudio Villa with the song "Non pensare a me". The song would be recorded by many notable artists that year, with the winners releasing the song in multiple countries themselves.

== Connie Francis version ==
=== Background ===
Francis returned to San Remo in 1967 to present "Canta ragazzina" with her team partner Bobby Solo. The song would drop out, not appearing as a finalist song, but she would record the winning song, (Non pensare a me) with English lyrics.

Picture of Francis in March of 1967, used in an ad to promote the single

=== Chart performance ===
Soon after its release, the track reached No. 14 on the Billboard Easy Listening five weeks after its debut appearance and No. 94 on the Billboard Hot 100. On the Cashbox singles charts the single would stall at No. 114, and on the Record World charts the single would reach No. 112. On the magazine's Top Non-Rock chart the single would debut at No. 35, peaking at No. 11 the next month.

=== Reception ===
The single received a positive critical reception upon its release. Cashbox would write "'Time Alone Will Tell (Non Pensare A Mi)' gets English lyrics and a potent reading in the hands of Connie Francis. A perfect vehicle for the songstress, this one could bring her quickly back into the chart scene. Flip is a sweeping version of 'Born Free.'" Record World would review the single, noting "The San Remo winner done with new English lyric by Connie. Will get mucho attention." In Billboard it was said "And time alone will tell if this doesn’t prove to be Connie's biggest single ever! (After all, isn’t that just what you'd expect when the First Lady of Song sings the First Song of the San Remo Festival? And backs it with an Oscar nominee!)”

== Other charting versions ==
=== Italian releases ===
- Claudio Villa, the winner of the festival, released "Non pensare a me" as a single soon after, with his version reaching No. 10 in Italy.
- Iva Zanicchi, also the winner, released the song as a single soon after too with the B-side "Vita", but her version only reached No. 21 on the Italian charts. In the US the single would be released under United Artists.

=== English releases ===
- Malcolm Roberts released a version of the song as a single in 1967 under RCA Victor. It reached No. 45 on the UK Singles Chart.
- Jerry Vale released a version of the song as a single in 1967 under Columbia. It reached No. 6 on the Billboard Easy Listening chart. His version also "bubled under" the Hot 100, reaching No. 26, and became his last song to be close to break into the Hot 100. On Record World's Top Non-Rock chart the song peaked at No. 7 in late May. On the magazine's pop singles charts it peaked at No. 117. With the song's success he would record his second album of the year Time Alone Will Tell and Other Great Hits of Today.

== Other single releases ==
- Ronnie Aldrich and Camarata and His Orchestra released a version of the song as a single in 1967, under London Records.
- Enzo Stuarti released a version of the song as a single in 1967, under Epic Records.
- Sergio Franchi released a version of the song as a single in 1968, also under RCA.

== Charts ==
=== Connie Francis ===
Chart (1967)	Peak position
US Billboard Hot 100	98
US Billboard Easy Listening	14
US Cashbox 100 Top Singles	114
US Record World Top 100 Pops	112
US Record World Top Non-Rock	11

=== "Non Pensare e Me" ===
Singer	Chart (1967)	Peak position
Claudio Villa	Italian Top Singles (Musica e dischi)	10
Iva Zanicchi	Italian Top Singles (Musica e dischi)	21

=== Jerry Vale ===
Chart (1967)	Peak position
US Billboard Hot 100	126
US Billboard Easy Listening	6
US Record World Top 100 Pops	117
US Record World Top Non-Rock	7

=== Malcolm Roberts ===
Chart (1967)	Peak position
UK Singles Chart	45

== See also ==
- Sanremo Music Festival winners discography
