= Innamorata (song) =

Single by Dean Martin
- A-side: "The Lady with the Big Umbrella"
- Released: February 13, 1956
- Recorded: November 18, 1955
- Genre: Traditional pop
- Length: 2:22
- Label: Capitol
- Composer: Harry Warren
- Lyricist: Jack Brooks
- Producer: Lee Gillette

"Innamorata" is a song written in 1955. The music was written by Harry Warren and the lyrics by Jack Brooks.

== Background ==
It was written for the 1955 Martin and Lewis film, Artists and Models and Dean Martin sang it while rubbing sun oil into Dorothy Malone's back. Shirley MacLaine reprised the song to Jerry Lewis in comedy fashion. In Italian, the word innamorata means "in love".

== Chart performance ==
The biggest selling recording of the song was sung by Dean Martin (issued as Capitol Records catalog number 3352), reaching number 27 on the Billboard chart in 1956. Jerry Vale also had a major recording (Columbia Records catalog number 40634) of the song in the same year, which peaked at number 30. In 2014, Vale was interviewed by a YouTube user about the song, and talked about how his version was recorded:

Someone from Famous Music called me and told me they had that song, but he said "I've got to be honest with you, Dean Martin is doing it in the movie, and he's probably going to make a record for Capitol." I listened to it, and I thought it was a great song for me. The recording was very unusual in that the musicians formed a circle, and I was in the middle of the orchestra, on a podium, with the microphone above my head. It was intimidating.

On the Cashbox magazine Best-Selling Records chart, which combined all versions of the song, it reached position number 17.

== Popular culture ==
The song is used in the comedy film Hot Shots! Part Deux.
