= Jerry Vale Sings the Great Hits of Nat King Cole =

Studio album by Jerry Vale
- Released: January 5, 1972
- Recorded: November 2-4 1971
- Genres: Pop; Traditional pop; Easy listening
- Length: 28 minutes 25 seconds
- Label: Columbia Records
- Producer: Didier C. Deutsch

Jerry Vale chronology
| I Don't Know How to Love Her (1971) | Jerry Vale Sings the Great Hits of Nat King Cole (1972) | Jerry Vale's All-Time Greatest Hits (1972) |

Jerry Vale Sings the Great Hits of Nat King Cole is a tribute album to Nat "King" Cole by American singer Jerry Vale released in early 1972 on Columbia Records.

== Overview ==
Jerry Vale Sings the Great Hits of Nat King Cole was the first of three albums that Vale released in 1972. The album featured covers of popular songs by the then deceased American singer Nat King Cole. Sessions were held between November 2nd and 4th, with production handled by Didier C. Deutsch and arrangements by Al Capps. It was his fortieth album overall for Columbia Records.

== Chart performance ==
The album debuted on Billboard magazine's Top LP's chart in the issue dated February 12, 1972, peaking at No. 200 during a two-week run on the chart. It was his last charting album.

== Reception ==
The album received a positive reception upon its release. Billboard magazine wrote, "Vale comes up with some moving, warm readings of the late Nat King Cole's classics", also noting that the album had some "Fine backing" from the Al Capps arrangements. Record World magazine reviewed the album and said "Jerry adds his special touch to some of the immortal Mr. Cole's greatest successes", ending the review with "They're all there to be enjoyed. We needn't say any more."

Stephen Thomas Erlewine on AllMusic reviewed the album and stated, "Although Vale was past his prime at the time the record was released in 1972, it remained one of his better album projects." He would add that "Capps' arrangements may have been a little syrupy, but appealingly so, and Vale remained in good voice. And, of course, there are the songs - the vocalist, producer and arranger all picked a wonderful set of Cole favorites".

== Track listing ==
Side One
| No. | Title | Writer(s) | Length |
|---|---|---|---|
| 1. | "Too Young" | Sidney Lippman, Sylvia Dee | 2:41 |
| 2. | "Answer Me, My Love" | Gerhard Winkler, Fred Rauch, Carl Sigman | 2:47 |
| 3. | "Smile" | Charlie Chaplin, Geoffrey Parsons, John Turner | 2:40 |
| 4. | "Somewhere Along the Way" | Sammy Gallop, Kurt Adams | 2:28 |
| 5. | "Nature Boy" | Eden Ahbez | 2:48 |
| 6. | "Unforgettable" | Irving Gordon | 2:50 |

Side Two
| No. | Title | Writer(s) | Length |
|---|---|---|---|
| 7. | "A Blossom Fell" | Harold Cornelius, Dominic John, Howard Barnes | 2:45 |
| 8. | "Mona Lisa" | Jay Livingston, Ray Evans | 2:44 |
| 9. | "Walkin' My Baby Back Home" | Fred E. Ahlert, Roy Turk | 1:47 |
| 10. | "Ramblin' Rose" | Noel Sherman, Joe Sherman | 2:44 |
| 11. | "Pretend" | Lew Douglas, Frank LaVere, Cliff Parman | 2:47 |
| Total length: | | | 28:25 |

== Charts ==
| Chart (1972) | Peak position |
|---|---|
| US Billboard Top LPs | 200 |
