= Stay Awhile =

Stay Awhile may refer to:

== Music ==
=== Albums ===
- Stay Awhile (Steve Cole album), 1998
- Stay Awhile (The Kingston Trio album), 1965
- Stay Awhile/I Only Want to Be with You, a 1964 album by Dusty Springfield featuring the song "Stay Awhile"

=== Songs ===
- "Stay Awhile" (The Bells song), a 1971 hit song by The Bells written by Ken Tobias
- "Stay Awhile" (Dusty Springfield song) from Stay Awhile/I Only Want to Be with You
- "Stay Awhile" (Soraya song) from On Nights Like This
- "Stay Awhile", a 1959 song by The Clovers
- "Stay Awhile", a song by Tina Turner from her 1993 album What's Love Got to Do With It
- "Stay Awhile", a song by Journey from their album Departure
- "Stay Awhile", a song by Kim Wilde from the album Catch as Catch Can
- "Stay A While", a song by Dan Saunders from the album Wade In: The Lockdown Project
