= The Language of Love (album) =

Studio album by Jerry Vale
- Released: July 1963
- Genre: Traditional pop
- Length: 37:02
- Labels: Columbia; CS-8981/CL-2181
- Producer: Mike Berniker

Jerry Vale chronology
Arrivederci, Roma (1963)	The Language of Love (1963)	Till the End of Time and Other Great Love Themes (1964)

The Language of Love subtitled Sings Great Love Songs of the World is a studio album by American singer and actor Jerry Vale released in mid 1963 by Columbia Records. The album consists mainly of traditional pop standards across 12 tracks. It received positive reviews and reached No. 22 on the Billboard chart and No. 30/27 on the Cashbox.

== Critical reception ==
The album received a positive critical reception upon its release. Billboard put the album in its "Spotlight Pick" section, writing: "Here's another grouping of pleasant ballads that get the distinctive Vale touch," adding that "Tunes like 'You Belong to My Heart,' 'Wonderful One,' 'Two Different World,' and 'Auf Wiedersehen' are all right up his alley," calling it "Good programming." Cashbox in its "Pop Picks" reviews stated that "The chanter delivers these romantic ballads with warmth and lyrical purity, and his legions of fans will surely dig his treatments of 'You Belong To My Heart,' 'Two Different Worlds,' and 'The Song of Moulin Rouge.'"

== Chart performance and singles ==
The Language of Love was the second of Vale's LPs to reach the top-40 on the US album charts. The album debuted on Billboard magazine's Top LP's chart in the issue dated September 7, 1964, peaking at No. 22 during a thirty-five-week run on the chart. It entered Cashbox magazine's Top 100 Monaural Albums chart in the issue dated August 31, 1963, reaching No. 30 during its twenty-seven weeks on the chart, while reaching No. 27 on the Top 50 Stereo chart during a shorter tweenty-two-week run on it.

== Track listing ==
Side one
No.	Title	Writer(s)	Length
1.	"You Belong To My Heart (Solamente Una Vez)"	Lara; Gilbert	2:55
2.	"I Love You Much Too Much"	Olshey; Towber; Raye	4:00
3.	"Wonderful One"	Terriss; Grofé; Whiteman	3:07
4.	"La Vie En Rose"	Louiguy; David	3:33
5.	"Palermo"	Frisch; Tobias	2:30
6.	"Yours (Quiereme Mucho)"	Roig; Sherr; Gamse	3:55
Total length:			19:00

Side two
No.	Title	Writer(s)	Length
1.	"Two Different Worlds"	Frisch; Wayne	2:58
2.	"Maria Elena"	Barcelata; Russell	2:52
3.	"Your Love Is Mine (Dahil Sa Iyo)"	Velarde; Burke	2:57
4.	"The Song From Moulin Rouge (Where Is Your Heart)"	Auric; Engvick	2:50
5.	"Now"	Frisch; Tobias	2:32
6.	"Auf Wiederseh'n Sweetheart"	Storch; Sexton; Turner	2:53
Total length:			17:02

== Charts ==
Chart peaks for The Language of Love
Chart (1963)	Peak position
US Billboard Top LP's	22
US Cashbox Top 100 Monaural Albums	30
US Cashbox Top 50 Stereo	27

== Personnel ==
All credits are adapted from the liner notes of The Language of Love.

- Jerry Vale – lead vocals
- Glen Osser – arranger, conductor
- Mike Berniker – producer
- Bob Cato – photography
