= John Clowes =

John Clowes may refer to:

- John Clowes (footballer), English footballer
- John Clowes (priest), English cleric and fellow of Trinity College, Cambridge
- Johnny Clowes (John Alexander Clowes), American football player
- Jack Clowes (John William Preston Clowes), American-born British rugby union player
