= Always in My Heart =

Always in My Heart may refer to:

== Albums ==
- Siempre en Mi Corazón—Always in My Heart, a 1983 album by Plácido Domingo
- Always in My Heart, a 1987 album by Ray Conniff
- Always In My Heart, a 2001 album by R.W. Hampton
- Always in My Heart, a 1964 instrumental album. Los Indios Tabajaras

== Songs ==
- "Always in My Heart" (1942 song), a song by Bobby Vinton from the album Roses Are Red
- "Always in My Heart" (Tevin Campbell song), from the 1994 album I'm Ready
- "Always in My Heart", a track by Bob Seger & The Silver Bullet Band from the 1991 album The Fire Inside
- "Siempre en Mi Corazón" ("Always in My Heart"), a song from the 1942 film Always in My Heart

== Other uses ==
- Always in My Heart (film), a 1942 film directed by Jo Graham
- "Always in My Heart" (Doctors), a 2004 television episode
- A 2011 tweet by Louis Tomlinson addressed to Harry Styles, noted amongst Larry Stylinson conspiracy theorists
