= It's Magic (Jerry Vale album) =

Studio album by Jerry Vale
- Released: January 1966
- Genre: Pop
- Length: 31:58
- Labels: Columbia; CS-9244/CL-2244
- Producer: Ernie Altschuler

Jerry Vale chronology
There Goes My Heart (1965)	It's Magic (1966)	Great Moments on Broadway (1966)

Singles from It's Magic
- 1. "Big Wide World/Ashamed" Released: December 1965; 2. "It's Magic/My Melancholy Baby" Released: June 1966

It's Magic is a studio album by American singer and actor Jerry Vale released in early 1966 by Columbia Records. The album consists mainly of traditional pop standards across 12 tracks. It received positive reviews and reached No. 38 on the Billboard chart, No. 52 on the Cashbox chart and No. 39 on the Record World chart. Four of the songs in the album formed two singles,

== Critical reception ==
The album received a positive critical reception upon its release. Billboard put the album in their "Spotlight Pick" section, writing that Vale performs "with ease in his smooth and meaningful style." Cashbox stated that "Jerry Vale turns on the charm of his voice with this package of romantic melodies," saying "Backed by the soft orking of Marty Manning, the chanter displays excellent interpretations" of the songs. They called the album an "easy-to-listen-to collection of romantic ballads." Record World said it's a "pretty bouquet of tunes Jerry tosses to the ladies here," believing "He is in fine form for the new package outing."

== Chart performance and singles ==
It's Magic was Vale's final album to reach the top-40 on the US album charts. The album debuted on Billboard magazine's Top LP's chart in the issue dated February 21, 1966, peaking at No. 38 during a seventeen-week run on the chart. It entered Cashbox magazine's Top 100 Albums chart in the issue dated February 5, 1966, reaching No. 52 during its sixteen weeks on the chart. It's Magic entered the Record World 100 Top LP's chart in the issue also dated February 5, 1966, peaking at No. 39 in early April 1966 during an eighteen-week run on the chart.

"Big Wide World" was released as a single in December 1965, backed by "Ashamed". "Ashamed" reached the top-40 on America's Billboard Easy Listening chart, rising to the number 28 position, "Big Wide World" charted in Canada at number 25. "Ashamed" reached number 22 in Canada the following year. "It's Magic" and "My Melancholy Baby" were taken from the album and formed a single in June 1966, but they did not chart.

== Track listing ==
Side one
No.	Title	Writer(s)	Length
1.	"It's Magic"	Jule Styne; Sammy Cahn	2:39
2.	"Tears (For Souvenirs)"	Billy Uhr; Frank Capano	2:55
3.	"Big Wide World"	Teddy Randazzo; Bobby Weinstein; B. Barberis	2:35
4.	"Be Anything (But Be Mine)"	Irving Gordon	2:50
5.	"Is It Asking Too Much"	Carl Sigman; T. Varnick; N. Acquaviva	2:56
6.	"My Melancholy Baby"	Ernie Burnett; George A. Norton	3:26
Total length:			17:21

Side two
No.	Title	Writer(s)	Length
1.	"For Me"	Al Hoffman	2:37
2.	"Ashamed"	M. Kelly; Ann Peck	2:12
3.	"My Prayer"	Georges Boulanger; Carlos Gomez Barrera; Jimmy Kennedy	3:06
4.	"Red Sails in the Sunset"	Hugh Williams aka Wilhelm Grosz; Jimmy Kennedy	2:00
5.	"If It Isn't in Your Heart"	B. McKenna; E. Nadauld	2:15
6.	"Solitude"	Duke Ellington; Eddie DeLange; Irving Mills	2:27
Total length:			14:37

== Charts ==
Chart peaks for It's Magic
Chart (1966)	Peak position
US Billboard Top LP's	38
US Cashbox Top 100 Albums	52
US Record World 100 Top LP's	39

== Personnel ==
All credits are adapted from the liner notes of It's Magic.

- Jerry Vale – lead vocals
- Marty Manning – arranger, conductor
- Ernie Altschuler – producer
