= And This Is My Beloved =

Song from the 1953 musical Kismet

"And This Is My Beloved" is a popular song from the 1953 musical Kismet, credited to Robert Wright and George Forrest. Like most other music in the show, this melody was based on music composed by Alexander Borodin, in this case the nocturne from the third movement of Borodin's String Quartet No. 2 in D.

The same melody had earlier (1946) been used for a song credited to William Engvick, Bert Reisfeld and Alec Wilder entitled "Spring Magic," which was recorded by Charlie Spivak and his Orchestra.

== Recordings ==
- Alfred Drake, Doretta Morrow, Richard Kiley and Henry Calvin from the album Alfred Drake & the Kismet Original Broadway Cast – Kismet (1954).
- Jerry Vale – a single release (1953).
- Sammy Davis Jr. – a single release on the Decca label (1954).
- Sarah Vaughan – in the album The Divine Sarah (1954).
- Howard Keel, Ann Blyth and Vic Damone – from the soundtrack of the 1955 film version of Kismet.
- Vic Damone (1955).
- Mario Lanza – his version became popular in 1956 and appears on the album Lanza On B'way.
- Johnny Mathis – for his album Faithfully (1959).
- Sergio Franchi sang this song in 1962 when he was discovered by Norman Luboff singing on Sunday Night at the London Palladium. A favorite guest of Ed Sullivan, Franchi sang it on the February 4, 1968, broadcast by CBS; and recorded on his 1964 RCA Victor album The Exciting Voice of Sergio Franchi.
- Katherine Jenkins – included in her album Daydream (2011).
