= Malafemmena =

1951 Neapolitan song

"Malafemmena" (pronounced [malaˈfemmənə]; "Bad Woman") is a song written by the Neapolitan actor Totò (Antonio de Curtis) in 1951. It has become one of the most popular Italian songs, a classic of the Canzone Napoletana genre, and has been recorded by many artists.

== Background ==
Totò dedicated the song, which is in the Neapolitan language, to his wife, Diana Bandini, after they separated in 1950. It was first sung by Antonio Basurto, then by Mario Abbate before becoming a hit for Giacomo Rondinella.

== Film music ==
The song was used in the film Totò, Peppino e la malafemmina directed by Camillo Mastrocinque (1956), sung by Teddy Reno. It was the top-grossing movie of the year in Italy with a 1,751,300 Italian lire (about 40 million Euros in 2009) turnover.

== Covers ==
Among the many artists who have covered this song are the following:

- Mario Abbate
- Francesco Albanese
- Renzo Arbore
- Francesco Benigno
- Andrea Bocelli
- Patrizio Buanne
- Franco Califano
- Renato Carosone
- Gigi D'Alessio
- Lucio Dalla
- Maria Pia De Vito
- Peppino Di Capri
- Giuseppe Di Stefano
- Gabriella Ferri
- Nico Fidenco
- Sergio Franchi
- Connie Francis
- Nunzio Gallo
- Robert Goulet
- Enzo Jannacci
- Fausto Leali
- Manhattan Express
- Bruno Martino
- Leopoldo Mastelloni
- Mina
- Mario Merola
- Lou Monte
- Pietra Montecorvino
- Roberto Murolo
- Negramaro
- Tony Palermo
- Gino Paoli
- Nino Porzio
- Zizi Possi
- Patty Pravo
- Gigi Proietti
- Ruggero Raimondi
- Massimo Ranieri
- Aldo Romano
- Enzo Stuarti
- Jerry Vale
- Claudio Villa
- Jimmy Roselli
