= Have You Looked into Your Heart =

Single by Jerry Vale

from the album Have You Looked into Your Heart
- B-side: "Andiamo"
- Released: November 1964
- Genre: Traditional pop
- Length: 2:21
- Label: Columbia
- Songwriters: Billy Barberis; Teddy Randazzo; Bobby Weinstein

Jerry Vale singles chronology
"The Lights of Roma" (1964)	"Have You Looked into Your Heart" (1964)	"For Mama" (1965)

Professional ratings
Review scores
Source	Rating
Record World	4/5 stars
Billboard	Positive (Spotlight)
Cashbox	Positive (Best Bet)

"Have You Looked into Your Heart" is a 1964 single by Jerry Vale written by Billy Barberis, Teddy Randazzo, and Bobby Weinstein. The single went to number one on the Middle-Road Singles chart in February 1965 and number twenty-four on the Billboard Hot 100. The song was Vale's last Top 40 hit. The song was originally written in 1962.

== Reception ==
The single received a positive critical reception upon its release. Cashbox reviewed the single in early December and stated that Vale "has had hits in the past, and he can jump into the winners circle once again with this first-rate medium-paced, chorus-backed romancer about a guy who wants to start anew with his ex-gal." They noted that it's a "Good item for ops and deejays." Billboard believed that the "Topside is one of Jerry's most commercial sides in a while." They noted that it "Has all the sounds of hitting all types of programming and sales. The flip is a Latin-flavored ballad which has equal possibilities. Record World magazine gave the track four stars and simply described it as a "good song".

== See also ==
- List of number-one adult contemporary singles of 1965 (U.S.)
- Jerry Vale discography
