= You Can Never Give Me Back My Heart =

Single by Jerry Vale
- B-side: "And No One Knows"
- Released: January 1953
- Genre: Traditional pop
- Length: 2:37
- Label: Columbia; 4-39929
- Songwriters: Joe Marsala; Girard

Jerry Vale singles chronology
"You Can Never Give Me Back My Heart" (1953)	"And This Is My Beloved" (1953)

Professional ratings
Review scores
Source	Rating
Billboard	78/100
Cashbox	C+ (Good)

"You Can Never Give Me Back My Heart" is a song written by songwriting duo Marsala-Girard and most notably performed by Jerry Vale, who released it as his debut single for Columbia Records in early 1953, with a positive reception and a moderate chart presence. The song was included in Vale's compilation albums thereafter.

== Jerry Vale version ==
=== Background and release ===
Jerry Vale was first noticed by Columbia Records' Guy Mitchell in the early 1950s, after which Vale began recording for the records label. His first single for Columbia was scheduled to be "You Can Never Give Me Back My Heart". It was backed by a novelty song, "And No One Knows" on the B-side, which was a non-album release. Percy Faith conducted and arranged the chorus and orchestra on both sides. Reviews noted Vale's vocal technique, comparing it to Eddie Fisher.

=== Critical reception ===
The single was met with a positive critical reception upon its release. Cashbox reviewed the single in mid-February and classified it as a "good" record, giving it a C+ grade. They stated that "The wide ranged vocal talent of Jerry Vale is showcased by Percy Faith and his ork on a pretty tune set to a waltz tempo," adding that the "familiar melody is appealing." Billboard magazine gave the single a positive review and a rating of 78 as well, saying that Vale gives a "stylish reading of the pretty ballad, showing off his big, expressive pipes and his rich Vaal technique," adding that "the ork arrangement is excellent".

=== Chart performance ===
"You Can Never Give Me Back My Heart" was the first of seven hits Vale had in the 1950s. It debuted on the Billboard Coming Up in the Trade/The Disk Jockeys Pick on March 7, 1953, reaching No. 29 before quickly dropping out.

=== Track listing ===
7" single (Columbia 4-39929, 1953)
No.	Title	Writer(s)	Length
1.	"You Can Never Give Me Back My Heart"	Joe Marsala; Girard	2:30
2.	"And No One Knows"	Kabak	2:25

== Charts ==
Chart performance for "You Can Never Give Me Back My Heart"
Chart (1953)	Peak position
US Billboard Pop: The Disk Jockeys Pick	29
