= Don Hunstein =

American photographer (1928–2017)

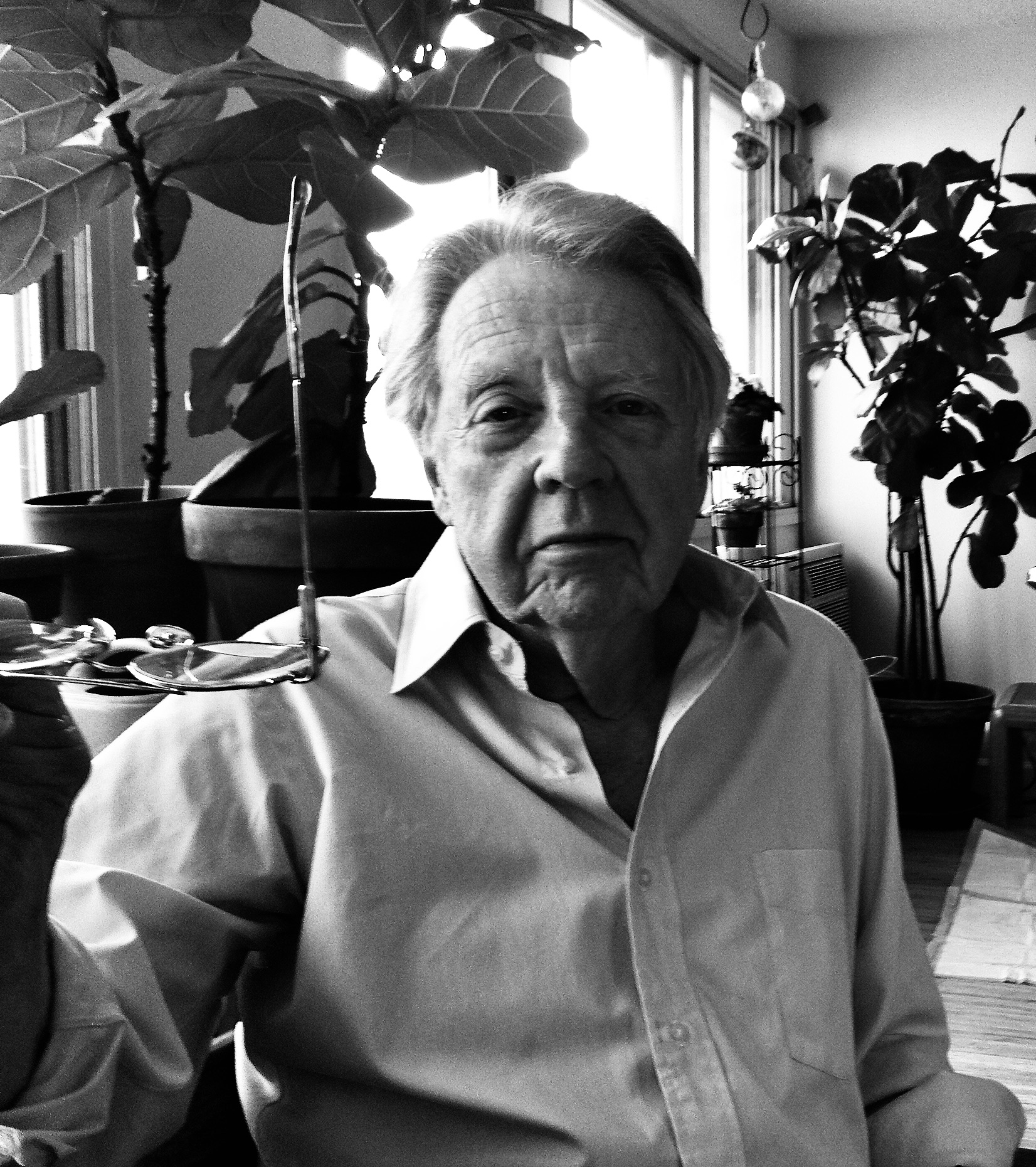
- Hunstein in 2012
- Born: Donald Robert Hunstein; November 19, 1928; St. Louis, Missouri, U.S.
- Died: March 18, 2017 (aged 88); Manhattan, New York, US
- Education: Washington University in St. Louis
- Occupation: Photographer
- Website: donhunstein.com

Donald Robert Hunstein (November 19, 1928 – March 18, 2017) was an American photographer.

== Life ==
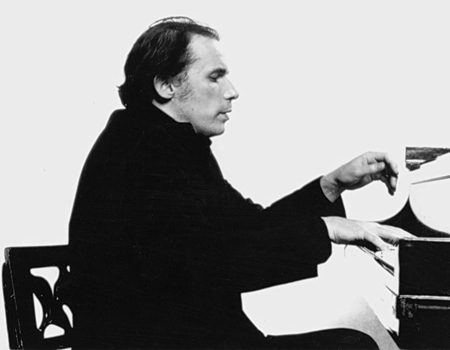
Glenn Gould, photographed by Don Hunstein, c. 1980

Hunstein studied at Washington University in St. Louis, graduating in 1950. He later served in the United States Air Force in England. He returned to the U.S. in 1954 and settled in New York City. In 1955, Hunstein began working for Columbia Records, photographing artists such as Duke Ellington, Billie Holiday, Tony Bennett, Barbra Streisand, Leonard Bernstein, Miles Davis, The Byrds, Aretha Franklin, and Janis Joplin. He remained there until 1986.

His photographs were published in the 2013 book Keeping Time: The Photographs of Don Hunstein. One of his best-known images is of Bob Dylan walking with Suze Rotolo; it was used for the cover of Dylan's album The Freewheelin' Bob Dylan.

He died on March 18, 2017, at the age of 88, from Alzheimer's disease.
