= Jerry Vale =

American traditional pop singer (1930–2014)

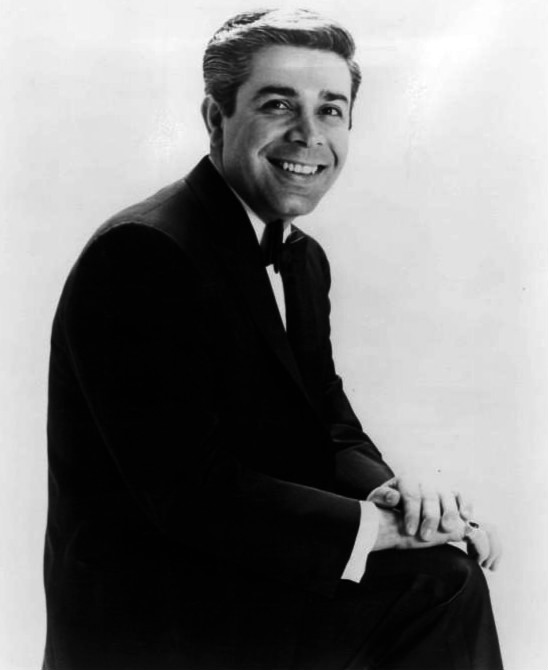
- Vale in 1965

Background information
- Born: Gennaro Louis Vitaliano; July 8, 1930; New York City, U.S.
- Died: May 18, 2014 (aged 83) Palm Desert, California, U.S.
- Genres: Easy listening, traditional pop
- Occupation: Singer
- Years active: 1950s–2000s
- Label: Columbia
- Spouse: Rita Grapel

Jerry Vale (born Gennaro Louis Vitaliano; July 8, 1930 – May 18, 2014) was an American traditional pop singer. During the 1950s and 1960s, he reached the top of the pop charts with his interpretations of romantic ballads, including a cover of Eddy Arnold hit "You Don't Know Me" (1956) and "Have You Looked into Your Heart" (1964). Vale, who was of Italian descent, sang numerous songs in Italian, many of which were used in soundtracks of films by Martin Scorsese.

Vale showed his love of Italian music with his albums, I Have But One Heart (1962) and Arrivederci, Roma (1963), full of Italian standards such as "Amore, Scusami", "Ciao, Ciao, Bambina", "Arrivederci, Roma", and "O Sole Mio". His renditions of "Volare", "Innamorata (Sweetheart)", and "Al di là" became classic Italian-American songs.

== Early life ==
Vale was born Gennaro Louis Vitaliano in the Bronx, New York, to Italian immigrant parents and grew up in the Wakefield section of the Bronx, which at the time was composed mainly of Italian-American families. In high school, to earn money, Vale took a job shining shoes in a barbershop, singing while he worked. His boss, Vito Veneziano, liked the sound so well that he paid for music lessons for the boy. Vale started singing in high school musicals and at a local nightclub. Still a teenager, he left school to work in a factory as an oiler alongside his father.

== Career ==
=== 1950–1959: Early singing and commercial success at Columbia ===
Vale's early nightclub performances led to additional shows in the early 1950s, including one lasting for three years at the Enchanted Room, a club in Yonkers, New York. When Paul Insetta (road manager for singer Guy Mitchell and hit songwriter) heard him there, he signed him to a management contract and further coached him. Insetta arranged for Vale to record some demonstration records of songs he'd written, and he brought them to Columbia Records. Guy Mitchell introduced Vale to Mitch Miller, then head of A&R at Columbia Records. Vale signed a recording contract, with Insetta as his manager for many years to come. Jerry Vale appeared on the Ted Mack Amateur Hour in 1950 singing "It Isn't Fair".

Vale's first recording with the Columbia label, with accompaniment by Percy Faith and his band, was "You Can Never Give Me Back My Heart", reached No. 29 on the Billboard Top 100 chart, becoming Vale's first U.S. hit. Later that year, he would release "Two Purple Shadows", which did better, peaking at No. 20 on the Billboard singles charts. He would record well into the 1950s, with some other top 40 hits of his being "You Don't Know Me" (No. 14) and "Innamorata (Sweetheart)" (No. 30). In 1958 he would record and release I Remember Buddy, a tribute album to 1930s and 40s singer Buddy Clark, which reached No. 21 on the Cashbox album charts. That same year, he recorded another tribute album, this time to Russ Columbo.

=== 1960–1971: Continued success with Columbia and height of career ===
In 1962 after a three-year break from studio albums, Vale would release an Italian-themed album titled I Have But One Heart, where he showcased his love for Italian music. The album proved to be successful and his next project, Arrivederci, Roma was released the next year. It also contained Italian standards, such as "Ciao, Ciao, Bambina", "Arrivederci, Roma", and "Volare". The album proved to be his most successful yet, reaching No. 34 on the Billboard and Cashbox album charts.

His version of "The Star-Spangled Banner", recorded in late 1963, was a fixture at many sporting events for years, and the gold record Vale received was displayed at the National Baseball Hall of Fame in Cooperstown, New York. Vale frequently sang the song at Yankee Stadium. Additionally, he owned the Florida minor-league team Daytona Beach Admirals.

Jerry Vale with host Ed Sullivan on The Ed Sullivan Show, June 8, 1969

His biggest hit would come in 1964, with the song "Have You Looked into Your Heart", which would top the Easy Listening chart. The single became his final top-forty pop hit as well, peaking at No. 24 on the Billboard Hot 100. His other singles would perform well on the easy listening charts too, with singles like "Time Alone Will Tell" and "Dommage, Dommage" reaching No. 6 and No. 5 on the chart respectively. The latter single would be his last appearance on the Billboard Hot 100 chart, peaking at No. 93 in late 1966. His final top-ten Easy Listening single would be "Don't Tell My Heart to Stop Loving You" which reached No. 6 on the charts in early 1968. Vale would continue recording singles up until 1978, placing 27 songs on the US Easy Listening chart and 9 on the Canadian Adult Contemporary chart.

Vale appeared often on television programs like The Ed Sullivan Show and Johnny Carson's Tonight Show. He performed at venues such as the Copacabana nightclub and Carnegie Hall, both located in New York City. In the latter he would record his first and only live album, Standing Ovation at Carnegie Hall (May 1964), which received a positive critical and commercial reception. Vale would consistently place albums on the Billboard 200 (then known as the Billboard Top LPs). The biggest successes came in the early 1960s with The Language of Love and Be My Love, but his later albums like Till reached high positions as well.

Jerry Vale worked in Las Vegas for the first time at the Sands Hotel, for a two-week gig. However, when Jack Entratter (the owner) personally heard Vale, he would say "Tell Vale that he can stay here as long as he likes. I like him!" That extended engagement lasted a way longer twenty-two weeks. During that time Vale would work alongside one of his early idols, Frank Sinatra, who set up a spot for Vale at the Sands Hotel in the first place. The two would become and remain close friends up until Sinatra's death in 1998. Barbara Sinatra noted in a statement, "Jerry Vale was a long, long-time friend of my husband. I loved him and his wife (Rita). She is one of my best friends." Whilst working at the Sands Hotel Vale befriended a number of popular entertainers, such as Jerry Lewis, Sammy Davis, Jr., and Nat King Cole, who would die just a few years later.

In January 1969, Vale re-signed a new contract with his longtime label Columbia, which would last an additional six years. By that point, Vale had been with the label for seventeen years and recorded twenty-four albums for it. He also had his own syndicated TV special to aired in the spring of that year called "A Very Special Occasion", which also spotlighted singer Joanie Sommers and television host Ed Sullivan. Vale would be on the latter's show five times that year as well, performing album cuts.

=== 1972–2002: Later career and performances ===
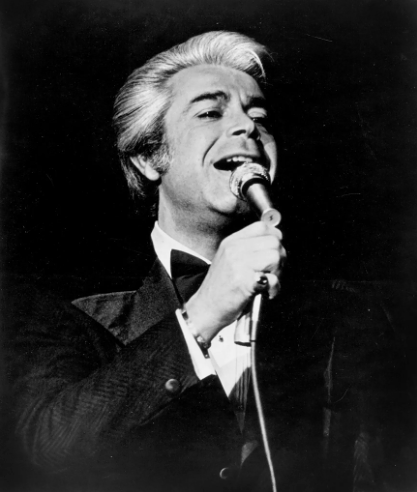
Jerry Vale singing in 1976

In early 1972 Vale released a tribute album to the late popular singer Nat King Cole, which reached No. 200 in the U.S. Vale was praised for his "warm readings" of the melodies and "special touch" added to the songs made popular by Cole. Vale would continue recording albums up until 1974, as sales gradually declined and chart performance diminished. However, the albums continued to receive positive reviews. For example, in Alone Again (Naturally) issued in late 1972, Vale was noted for his "strong, but warm way" with melodies.

Even though commercial success waned, Vale still remained a popular name in clubs and on television throughout the 1970s and 1980s. He sang the Late Night with David Letterman anthem "It's A Late Night World" on the program's eighth anniversary special in 1990. He made cameo appearances as himself in the 1990 film Goodfellas and the 1995 film Casino, both directed by Martin Scorsese.

Vale reportedly suffered a stroke in 2002 and did not perform in his later years, although his friends continued to encourage him to join them at gatherings and public appearances.

== Personal life ==
In 1959, Vale married Rita Grapel, an actress. The two would have a son and a daughter, Robert Vale and Pamela Vale Branch. His biography A Singer's Life, by Richard Grudens, was published in 2000 by Celebrity Profiles.

== Death ==
Jerry Vale died of natural causes in his sleep on May 18, 2014, at his home in Palm Desert, California. Vale was 83 years old. He is interred at Forest Lawn Cemetery, in Cathedral City, California.

== In popular culture ==
As an actor, Vale appeared as himself in the films Goodfellas and Casino as well as in television series such as The Sopranos, Midnight Caller, Who's the Boss? and Growing Pains.

In the 2016 Disney animated film Zootopia, there is a parody of Vale named Jerry Vole. In the film kids groove to the "torch-song stylings" of the pop star Gazelle, while their parents prefer "the velvety pipes" of Jerry Vole.

Vale is portrayed by Steven Van Zandt in the 2019 film The Irishman.

== Honors ==
In 1998, a Golden Palm Star on the Palm Springs Walk of Stars was dedicated to Vale.

== Discography ==
The list below shows the singer's studio albums and live albums only. His full discography, singles and other releases are described in a separate article. Vale placed 20 albums on the Billboard 200, ranking No. 36 among artists in total album placements between 1945 and 1972. In Joel Whitburn's ranking of top album-charting artists from 1955 to 1996, he was listed at No. 205.

- I Remember Buddy (1958)
- I Remember Russ (1958)
- The Same Old Moon (1959)
- I Have But One Heart (1962)
- Arrivederci, Roma (1963)
- The Language of Love (1963)
- Till the End of Time and Other Great Love Themes (1964)
- Be My Love (1964)
- Christmas Greetings from Jerry Vale (1964)
- Have You Looked into Your Heart (1964)
- Standing Ovation at Carnegie Hall (1965)
- There Goes My Heart (1965)
- It's Magic (1965)
- Great Moments on Broadway (1966)
- Sings Everybody Loves Somebody and Other Hits (1966)
- The Impossible Dream (1967)
- Time Alone Will Tell and Other Great Hits of Today (1967)
- You Don't Have to Say You Love Me (1968)
- I Hear a Rhapsody (1968)
- This Guy's In Love with You (1968)
- Till (1969)
- Where's the Playground Susie? (1969)
- Jerry Vale Sings 16 Greatest Hits of the 60's (1970)
- Let It Be (1970)
- I Don't Know How to Love Her (1971)
- We've Only Just Begun (1971)
- Alone Again (Naturally) (1972)
- Jerry Vale Sings the Great Hits of Nat King Cole (1972)
- Free as the Wind (Theme from Papillon) (1974)

=== Bibliography ===
- Grudens, Richard (2000). Jerry Vale: A Singer's Life. Celebrity Profiles Publishing. ISBN 1-57579-176-5.

== See also ==
- List of artists who reached number one on the U.S. Adult Contemporary chart
