= Mike Berniker =

American record producer

- Born: June 30, 1935; Brooklyn, New York, United States
- Died: July 25, 2008 (aged 73) Great Barrington, Massachusetts, United States
- Occupation: Record producer

Michael Berniker (June 30, 1935 – July 25, 2008) was an American record producer who was recognized with nine Grammy Awards over the course of his career for his work on albums with such performers as Perry Como, Steve Lawrence & Eydie Gorme, Johnny Mathis and Barbra Streisand, as well as Broadway theatre cast recordings, Latin jazz, classical, spoken word and comedy albums in a career that lasted some forty years for labels including Columbia Records and RCA Records.

Born on June 30, 1935, and raised in Brooklyn, he attended Columbia University, studying music and philosophy. While serving at Fort Bliss in El Paso County, Texas while in the United States Army for two years, he hosted a local radio show and organized a jazz festival.

While in his late-20s, Berniker produced Barbra Streisand's first three albums — The Barbra Streisand Album (that year's Grammy winner for Album of the Year), The Second Barbra Streisand Album and The Third Album — all of which were released six months apart in the one-year span from February 1963 to February 1964, and which were described by The New York Times as "among the most expressively uninhibited" of her career. Berniker also produced Streisand's classic career-making single "People", her first Top 10 single. He produced several Broadway albums, including his work with composer Cy Coleman on The Will Rogers Follies, which won the Grammy Award for Best Musical Show Album at the 1992 ceremonies. He won the Grammy Award for Best Spoken Word Album at the Grammy Awards of 1986 for his work as producer of the original Broadway cast album for Ma Rainey's Black Bottom.

As an executive with RCA Records, Berniker signed Dan Schafer, Daryl Hall and John Oates and Juice Newton.

Berniker lived with his wife Heather in Fort Lee, New Jersey from the mid-1970s until 2002, when they moved to Hillsdale, New York. He died on July 25, 2008, in Great Barrington, Massachusetts of complications from kidney disease.
