= Marty Manning =

American arranger and conductor

- Born: Martin Manning; April 26, 1916; Haverhill, Massachusetts, United States
- Died: November 22, 1971 (aged 55) Huntington, New York, US
- Genres: Traditional pop
- Occupation(s): Arranger, conductor
- Instrument: Violin
- Years active: Early 1940s–1971
- Labels: Columbia, RCA

Martin Manning (April 26, 1916 – November 22, 1971) was a Grammy-winning American arranger and conductor of popular music, most noted for his work at Columbia Records in the 1950s and early 1960s when he was "one of the most in-demand arrangers and conductors on the New York studio scene".

== Biography ==
He was born in Haverhill, Massachusetts, and learned the violin. By the early 1940s, he was established as a freelance arranger and worked on radio shows for both NBC and CBS. He started working regularly for Columbia Records in the early 1950s, and found success in 1953 when Tony Bennett's recording of "Rags to Riches", recorded with Percy Faith's orchestra and arranged by Manning, reached number one on the US pop chart for eight weeks. From then on, he worked regularly in providing orchestral backing for the label's star singers, including Bennett, Vic Damone, Buddy Greco, Andy Williams, Robert Goulet, and Barbra Streisand. In 1962, Manning won a Grammy for Best Background Arrangement on Tony Bennett's "I Left My Heart in San Francisco".

On many of his recordings, Manning worked closely with record producer Ernie Altschuler (1922–1973). In 1960, Manning and Altschuler collaborated on an album, The Twilight Zone: a sound adventure in space, which took its title and opening theme from the popular television series. Credited to Marty Manning and his Orchestra, the LP featured outer space oriented tunes recorded with top New York City session musicians including Mundell Lowe (guitar), Jerry Murad (harmonica), Harry Breuer (vibraphone), and Phil Kraus (percussion). Soprano Lois Hunt provided wordless vocals, and Teo Macero was credited with special effects. Manning himself was credited with playing the serpent, Ondioline, and ondes Martenot.

During the 1960s, Manning worked for labels other than Columbia, and contributed arrangements for Dinah Washington, Sarah Vaughan, Harry Belafonte, Brenda Lee, the Ventures and others. In 1970, he joined Altschuler at RCA Records, where he worked on arrangements for Perry Como.

Manning died at his home in Huntington, New York, in 1971, aged 55, from a stroke caused by an undiagnosed congenital aneurysm.
