= Glenn Osser =

American conductor and songwriter (1914–2014)

- Born: Abraham Arthur Osser; August 28, 1914; Munising, Michigan, U.S.
- Died: April 29, 2014 (aged 99) Harrison, New York, U.S.
- Genres: Pop, jazz
- Occupation(s): Conductor, arranger, songwriter, musician

Abraham Arthur "Glenn" Osser (August 28, 1914 – April 29, 2014) was an American musician, musical arranger, orchestra leader, and songwriter. His birthname was Abraham (Abe), but much of his work was under the name Glenn; he can be found with references under both names. He also worked under a number of other names: Arthur Meisel, Bob Marvel, Maurice Pierre, and others.

== Biography ==
Abraham "Glenn" Osser was born in Munising, Michigan, United States, the child of Russian-Jewish immigrants. He studied piano, violin, saxophone and clarinet in high school and went on to study music at the University of Michigan, beginning in music education and switching to music theory. After graduating in 1935 he worked with a college dance band and, on advice from the band leader, moved to New York City, where he met music publisher Charles Warren, who became Osser's mentor. With introductions from Warren, Osser began arranging for Bob Crosby, Vincent Lopez, Al Donahue, Charlie Barnet, Bunny Berigan, and Ben Bernie. He also began some radio work, hired by NBC to be a staff arranger with a young conductor, Al Roth. He also played sax and clarinet in some orchestras, including Les Brown's Band of Renown, where he became a close friend of Brown's. He also got to work with Benny Goodman on his radio program, and (although he was not officially credited) wrote the arrangement of Martha Tilton's recording of "And the Angels Sing" with the Goodman orchestra. Osser wrote the melody to Ruth Lowe's number one hit, "I'll Never Smile Again", recorded by Tommy Dorsey and his Orchestra with the Piped Pipers and Frank Sinatra.

During World War II Osser served in the U.S. Maritime Service, stationed on Hoffman Island in New York harbor. After his discharge in 1944 he began to arrange for the Paul Whiteman orchestra. (According to one source, it was Whiteman who, disliking the name "Abe Osser," suggested the name "Glenn." Another source credits the name change to Bud Barry, director of programming at ABC.) Osser rehearsed and conducted Whiteman's orchestra on the NBC Blue Network, which became the ABC Network, and when Whiteman went on ABC television, Osser joined him. Whiteman became music director at ABC and put Osser on as staff, where he served from 1947 to 1969, when staff orchestras were eliminated. During his time at ABC, Osser was the orchestra director for Theater-Five (1964-5), ABC's attempt at reviving theatrical radio. In 1962, the expansion New York Mets entered the National League and were greeted on the field by a recording of "Meet the Mets", arranged and recorded by the Glenn Osser Orchestra. The song is still played at Mets games and on broadcasts to this day.

Osser became an arranger/conductor, first for Mercury Records, where he backed such vocalists as Patti Page, Vic Damone, and Georgia Gibbs, and later for Columbia Records, where he backed Doris Day, Jerry Vale, Johnny Mathis and Jill Corey, among others. On television he was musical director for the 1949 series Blind Date (also titled Your Big Moment), conductor for the 1953 series The Vaudeville Show, and orchestrator and conductor for the 1957 production of Pinocchio. In 1959 he was the Orchestra leader for the series Music for a Summer Night, which was repeated the following year as Music for a Spring Night. Osser was the conductor and provided the arrangements for the 1963 Sergio Franchi RCA Victor Red Seal album, Broadway, I Love You!.

Osser was the long-time musical director and conductor for the Miss America Pageant. He co-wrote the opening numbers and incidental music with his wife Edna providing lyrics.

Osser died at the age of 99 on April 29, 2014.
