= The Dave Clark Five discography =

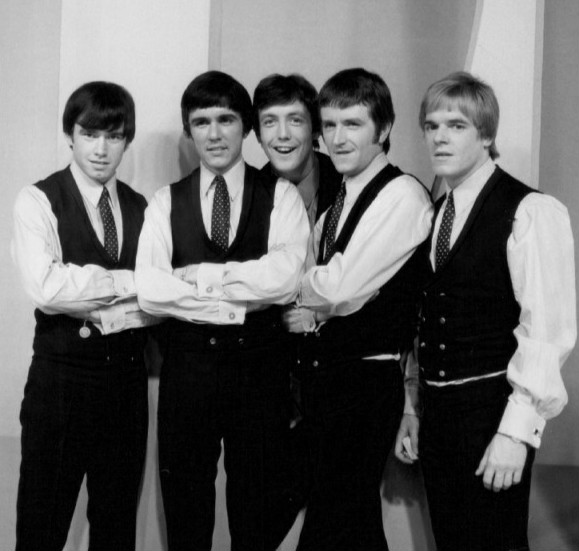
- The Dave Clark Five on The Ed Sullivan Show in 1966. From left: Denis Payton, Dave Clark, Mike Smith, Rick Huxley, and Lenny Davidson.
- Studio albums: 20
- Extended plays: 3
- Compilation albums: 12
- Singles: 47

The Dave Clark Five were an English pop rock band which formed part of the British Invasion of beat music groups in the early-mid 1960s. The group was made up of members Dave Clark, Denis Payton, Mike Smith, Rick Huxley, and Lenny Davidson.

== Albums ==
=== Studio albums (UK) ===
Title	Album details	Peak chart positions
Title	Album details	UK
A Session with the Dave Clark Five	Released: 10 April 1964; Label: Columbia; Formats: LP	3
Catch Us If You Can	Released: 6 August 1965; Label: Columbia; Formats: LP	8
Everybody Knows	Released: 15 December 1967; Label: Columbia; Formats: LP, reel-to-reel	—
5 By 5 (1964–69)	Released: 1 November 1968; Label: Columbia; Formats: LP	—
If Somebody Loves You	Released: December 1970; Label: Columbia; Formats: LP	—
The Dave Clark Five Play Good Old Rock & Roll – 18 Golden Oldies	Released: December 1971; Label: Starline; Formats: LP	—
Dave Clark & Friends (Note: Only part of the album consists of the band's recordings, the rest is the solo project of Dave Clark and singer Mike Smith)	Released: 1972; Label: EMI Columbia; Formats: LP	—
"—" denotes releases that did not chart.

=== Studio albums (US and Canada) ===
Title	Album details	Peak chart positions			Certifications
Title	Album details	CAN	US BB	US CB	Certifications
Glad All Over (Note: Released in Canada in May 1964 as Bits and Pieces.)	Released: 17 March 1964; Label: Epic, Capitol; Formats: LP	1	3	6	US: Gold
Session with the Dave Clark Five	Released: 13 April 1964; Label: Capitol; Formats: LP	3	—	—	
The Dave Clark Five Return!	Released: 22 May 1964; Label: Epic; Formats: LP	—	5	7	
American Tour (Note: Release in Canada in September 1964 as On Stage with the Dave Clark Five)	Released: 20 July 1964; Label: Epic, Capitol; Formats: LP	—	11	16	
Coast to Coast (Note: Released in Canada in January 1965 as Across Canada with the Dave Clark Five.)	Released: 21 December 1964; Label: Epic, Capitol; Formats: LP	—	6	10	
Weekend in London (Note: Released in Canada in April 1965 as Encores.)	Released: 1 March 1965; Label: Epic, Capitol; Formats: LP	—	24	24	
Having a Wild Weekend	Released: 28 June 1965; Label: Epic, Capitol; Formats: LP	—	15	11	
I Like It Like That (Note: Released in Canada in March 1966 as Over and Over.)	Released: 15 November 1965; Label: Epic, Capitol; Formats: LP	—	32	41	
The Dave Clark Five Instrumental Album	Released: 2 May 1966; Label: Capitol; Formats: LP	—	—	—	
Try Too Hard (Note: Released in Canada in June 1966 as At the Scene)	Released: 31 May 1966; Label: Epic, Capitol; Formats: LP	—	77	25	
Satisfied with You	Released: 15 August 1966; Label: Epic; Formats: LP	—	127	85	
5 by 5	Released: 20 February 1967; Label: Epic; Formats: LP	—	119	66	
You Got What It Takes	Released: 26 June 1967; Label: Epic, Capitol; Formats: LP, 8-track	—	149	77	
Everybody Knows	Released: January 1968; Label: Epic, Capitol; Formats: LP, 4-track	—	—	—	
"—" denotes releases that did not chart or were not released in that territory.

=== Compilation albums ===
Title	Album details	Peak chart positions				Certifications
Title	Album details	UK	CAN	US BB	US CB	Certifications
The Hits of the Dave Clark Five	Released: 3 January 1966; Label: Capitol; Formats: LP	—	—	—	—	
The Dave Clark Five's Greatest Hits	Released: March 1966; Label: Columbia, Epic; Formats: LP, 4-track	—	—	9	7	US: Gold
More Greatest Hits	Released: December 1966; Label: Epic; Formats: LP	—	—	103	49	
More Hits of the Dave Clark Five	Released: 3 April 1967; Label: Capitol; Formats: LP	—	—	—	—	
The Best of the Dave Clark Five	Released: October 1970; Label: Starline; Formats: LP	—	—	—	—	
The Dave Clark Five	Released: October 1971; Label: Epic; Formats: 2xLP	—	—	—	—	
Glad All Over Again – The Dave Clark Five's All-Time Greatest Hits	Released: April 1975; Label: Epic; Formats: 2xLP	—	—	—	—	
25 Thumping Great Hits	Released: February 1978; Label: Polydor; Formats: LP, MC, 8-track	7	—	—	—	UK: Gold
Glad All Over Again – Thirty Five Solid Gold Hits	Released: 5 April 1993; Label: EMI; Formats: CD, 2xLP, MC	28	16	—	—	
The History of the Dave Clark Five	Released: 3 August 1993; Label: Hollywood; Formats: 2xCD, 2xMC	—	—	127	—	
The Hits	Released: 13 October 2008; Label: Universal; Formats: CD	15	—	—	—	
All the Hits	Released: 24 January 2020; Label: BMG; Formats: CD, LP, 2xLP, digital download	10	—	—	—	
"—" denotes releases that did not chart or were not released in that territory.

=== EPs ===
Title	EP details	Peak chart positions
Title	EP details	UK
The Dave Clark Five	Released: December 1963; Label: Columbia; Formats: 7"	2
Hits of the Dave Clark Five	Released: December 1964; Label: Columbia; Formats: 7"	20
Wild Weekend	Released: September 1965; Label: Columbia; Formats: 7"	10

== Singles ==
Title	Year	Peak chart positions										UK Album	US Album
Title	Year	UK	AUS	CAN	GER	IRE	NL	NZ	SA	SWE	US	UK Album	US Album
"I Knew It All the Time" (Note: Released in the US in 1964.) b/w "That's What I Said"	1962	—	—	—	—	—	—	—	—	—	53	Non-album tracks	Non-album tracks
"Chaquita" b/w "In Your Heart"	1962	—	—	—	—	—	—	—	—	—	—	Non-album tracks	A: Glad All Over; B: Non-album track
"First Love" b/w "I Walk the Line"	1962	—	—	—	—	—	—	—	—	—	—	Non-album tracks	Non-album tracks
"The Mulberry Bush" b/w "Chaquita"	1963	—	—	—	—	—	—	—	—	—	—	Non-album tracks	A: Non-album track B: Glad All Over
"Do You Love Me" b/w "Doo-Dah"	1963	30	—	5	—	—	—	—	—	—	11	Non-album tracks	Glad All Over
"Glad All Over" b/w "I Know You"	1963	1	3	2	16	1	4	1	—	2	6	Non-album tracks	Glad All Over
"Bits and Pieces" b/w "All of the Time"	1964	2	4	1	20	1	6	3	—	9	4	Non-album tracks	Glad All Over
"Can't You See That She's Mine" b/w "Because" (UK); "No Time to Lose" (US)	1964	10	13	3	43	—	—	7	—	—	4	A: A Session with the Dave Clark Five; UK & US B: Non-album tracks	A: The Dave Clark Five Return! UK B: American Tour; US B: Glad All Over
"Thinking of You Baby" b/w "Whenever You're Around"	1964	26	48	—	—	—	—	—	—	—	—	Non-album tracks	A: You Got What It Takes; B: American Tour
"Because" (Note: "Because" was only released as a single in North America and Continental Europe.) b/w "Can't You See That She's Mine"	1964	—	—	3	—	—	—	3	—	—	3	A: Non-album track B: A Session with the Dave Clark Five	A: American Tour; B: The Dave Clark Five Return!
"Everybody Knows (I Still Love You)" b/w "Say You Want Me" (UK); "Ol' Sol" (US)	1964	37	—	21	—	—	—	—	—	—	15	Non-album tracks	A & UK B: Coast to Coast; US B: American Tour
"Any Way You Want It" b/w "Crying Over You"	1964	25	77	7	—	—	—	—	—	—	14	Non-album tracks	Coast to Coast
"Come Home" b/w "Mighty Good Loving" (UK); "Your Turn to Cry" (US)	1965	16	31	6	—	—	—	—	—	—	14	A & UK B: Non-album tracks US B: Catch Us If You Can	Weekend in London
"Reelin' and Rockin'" b/w "Little Bitty Pretty One" (UK); "I'm Thinking" (US)	1965	24	12	10	—	—	—	—	—	15	23; 128	Non-album tracks	A: Non-album track UK B: Weekend in London
"I Like It Like That" (Note: "I Like It Like That" was only released as a single in North America, Australasia, Continental Europe and Japan.) b/w "Hurting Inside"	1965	—	12	3	—	—	—	—	—	—	7	A: Non album track B: Catch Us If You Can	A: I Like It Like That; B: Weekend in London
"Catch Us If You Can" b/w "Move On" (UK); "On the Move" (US)	1965	5	18	5	—	—	—	—	5	—	4	A and US B: Catch Us If You Can; UK B: Non-album track	A & US B: Having a Wild Weekend UK B: American Tour
"Over and Over" b/w "I'll Be Yours (My Love)"	1965	45	24	1	12	—	—	3	—	3	1	Non-album tracks	A: Non-album track B: I Like It Like That
"Having a Wild Weekend" (Note: "Having a Wild Weekend" was only released as a single in Canada.) b/w "No Stopping"	1965	—	—	—	—	—	—	—	—	—	—	Non-album tracks	Having a Wild Weekend
"At the Scene" (Note: "At the Scene" was only released as a single in North America, Australasia, Continental Europe and Japan.) b/w "I Miss You"	1966	—	34	1	—	—	—	19	—	—	18	Non-album tracks	Non-album tracks
"Try Too Hard" b/w "All Night Long"	1966	—	74	5	—	—	—	—	—	—	12	Non-album tracks	A: Trying Too Hard; B: Non-album track
"Look Before You Leap" (Note: These sides were flipped when released in North America.) b/w "Please Tell Me Why"	1966	50	—	— 5	—	—	—	—	—	—	101; 28	Non-album tracks	Satisfied with You
"Satisfied with You" (Note: "Satisfied with You" was only released as a single in North America and Italy.) b/w "Don't Let Me Down"	1966	—	—	32	—	—	—	—	—	—	50	Non-album tracks	A: Satisfied with You; B: Non-album track
"Nineteen Days" b/w "I Need Love" (UK); "Sitting Here Baby" (US)	1966	54 (Note: Chart position is from the official UK "Breakers List".)	—	23	—	—	—	14	—	—	48	A & UK B: Non-album tracks US B: Everybody Knows	A & US B: 5 by 5 UK B: Non-album track
"I've Got to Have a Reason" (Note: "I've Got to Have a Reason" was only released as a single in North America, Australasia and Germany.) b/w "Good Time Woman"	1966	—	—	31	—	—	—	—	—	—	44	A: Everybody Knows; B: Non-album track	A: You Got What It Takes; B: Non-album track
"You Got What It Takes" b/w "Sitting Here Baby" (UK); "Doctor Rhythm" (US)	1967	28	46	7	—	—	—	—	—	—	7	A & UK B: Everybody Knows; US B: Non-album track	A & US B: You Got What It Takes; UK B: 5 by 5
"Tabatha Twitchit" b/w "Man in a Pin-Striped Suit"	1967	51	58	—	—	—	—	2	—	—	—	A: Everybody Knows; B: Non-album track	A: You Got What It Takes; B: Non-album track
"You Must Have Been a Beautiful Baby" (Note: "You Must Have Been a Beautiful Baby" was only released as a single in North America and Australia.) b/w "Man in a Pin Striped Suit"	1967	—	88	37	—	—	—	—	—	—	35	A: Everybody Knows; B: Non-album track	A: Everybody Knows; B: Non-album track
"A Little Bit Now" (Note: "A Little Bit Now" was only released as a single in North America and Australasia.) b/w "You Don't Play Me Around"	1967	—	96	60	—	—	—	—	—	—	67	A: Non-album track B: Everybody Knows	A: Everybody Knows; B: You Got What It Takes
"Red and Blue" (Note: "Red and Blue" was only released as a single in North America.) b/w "Concentration Baby"	1967	—	—	42	—	—	—	—	—	—	89	A: If Somebody Loves You; B: Non-album track	Everybody Knows
"Everybody Knows" b/w "Concentration Baby" (UK); "Inside and Out" (US)	1967	2	42	34	36	6	5	6	7	—	43	A & US B: Everybody Knows; UK B: Non-album track	Everybody Knows
"No One Can Break a Heart Like You" b/w "You Don't Want My Lovin'"	1968	28	—	—	—	—	—	—	—	—	—	A: 5 by 5 B: Non-album track	Non-album tracks
"Please Stay" (Note: "Please Stay" was only released as a single in North America, New Zealand and Germany.) b/w "Forget"	1968	—	—	75	—	—	—	—	—	—	115	A: 5 by 5 B: Non-album track	Non-album tracks
"The Red Balloon" b/w "Maze of Love"	1968	7	51	—	13	8	—	8	6	—	—	5 by 5	Non-album tracks
"Live in the Sky" b/w "Children"	1968	39	—	—	—	—	—	—	—	—	—	A: If Somebody Loves You; B: Non-album track	Non-album tracks
"The Mulberry Tree" b/w "Small Talk"	1969	—	—	—	—	—	—	—	—	—	—	Non-album tracks	Non-album tracks
"Paradise (Is Half as Nice)" (Note: "Paradise (Is Half as Nice)" was only released as a single in the US.) b/w "34-06"	1969	—	—	—	—	—	—	—	—	—	— (Note: "Paradise (Is Half as Nice)" did not enter the Billboard Hot 100, but did peak at number 119 on the Cash Box chart.)	A: Non-album track B: 5 by 5	Non-album tracks
"If Somebody Loves You" (Note: "If Somebody Loves You" was only released as a single in the US.) b/w "Best Day's Work"	1969	—	—	—	—	—	—	—	—	—	—	A: If Somebody Loves You; B: 5 by 5	Non-album tracks
"Put a Little Love in Your Heart" b/w "34-06"	1969	31	94	—	34	—	—	—	—	—	—	A: Dave Clark & Friends; B: 5 by 5	Non-album tracks
"Good Old Rock 'n' Roll" b/w "Good Old Rock 'n' Roll (Part 2)"	1969	7	92	—	—	10	—	—	16	—	—	The Dave Clark Five Play Good Old Rock & Roll	Non-album tracks
"Bring It On Home to Me" (Note: "Bring It On Home to Me" was only released as a single in the US.) b/w "Darling, I Love You"	1969	—	—	—	—	—	—	—	—	—	—	A: Dave Clark & Friends; B: If Somebody Loves You	Non-album tracks
"Everybody Get Together" b/w "Darling I Love You"	1970	8	—	—	—	—	—	—	18	—	—	If Somebody Loves You	Non-album tracks
"Julia" b/w "Five by Five"	1970	—	—	—	—	—	—	—	—	—	—	If Somebody Loves You	Non-album tracks
"Here Comes Summer" b/w "Break Down and Cry"	1970	44	—	—	—	—	—	—	—	—	— (Note: "Here Comes Summer" did not enter the Billboard Hot 100, but did peak at number 135 on the Cash Box chart.)	If Somebody Loves You	Non-album tracks
"More Good Old Rock 'n' Roll" b/w "More Good Old Rock 'n' Roll (Part 2)"	1970	34	—	—	—	—	—	—	—	—	—	The Dave Clark Five Play Good Old Rock & Roll	Non-album tracks
"Southern Man" b/w "If You Wanna See Me Cry"	1971	—	—	—	—	—	—	—	—	—	—	A: Dave Clark & Friends; B: If Somebody Loves You	Non-album tracks
"Won't You Be My Lady" b/w "Into Your Life"	1971	—	—	—	—	—	—	—	—	—	—	A: Dave Clark & Friends; B: Non-album track	Non-album tracks
"Glad All Over" (re-release) b/w "Good Old Rock 'n' Roll"	1993	37	—	—	—	—	—	—	—	—	—	Glad All Over Again	Non-album tracks
"—" denotes releases that did not chart or were not released in that territory.
