= The History of The Dave Clark Five =

Compilation album by The Dave Clark Five
- Released: 1993
- Genre: Rock
- Label: Hollywood
- Producer: Dave Clark

Professional ratings
Review scores
| Source | Rating |
|---|---|
| AllMusic | 4.5/5 stars |

The History of The Dave Clark Five is a compilation album by the English rock band the Dave Clark Five, released in 1993 by Hollywood Records. Released at the same time as its UK counterpart Glad All Over Again, it features a different track listing. It spent a week on the Billboard 200 charts in August 1993 at No. 127. With the exception of "You Must Have Been a Beautiful Baby", all of the DC5's Top 40 hits are featured, as well as classic album tracks, non-LP tracks and UK-only releases.

== Track listing ==
Disc one

1. "Glad All Over" (Dave Clark, Mike Smith) – 2:42
2. "Bits and Pieces" (Clark, Smith) – 1:59
3. "Do You Love Me" (Berry Gordy) – 2:44
4. "Can't You See That She's Mine" (Clark, Smith) – 2:21
5. "Because" (Clark) – 2:22
6. "Don't Let Me Down" (Clark, Smith) – 1:41
7. "Any Way You Want It" (Clark) – 2:29
8. "Everybody Knows (I Still Love You)" (Clark) – 1:40
9. "Anytime You Want Love" (Clark, Lenny Davidson) – 2:12
10. "Thinking of You Baby" (Clark, Smith) – 2:31
11. "Whenever You're Around" (Clark, Smith) – 2:54
12. "Little Bitty Pretty One" (Robert James Byrd) – 1:30
13. "Crying Over You" (Clark, Davidson) – 2:08
14. "Don't Be Taken In" (Clark, Davidson) – 2:23
15. "When" (Clark, Davidson) – 2:29
16. "Reelin' and Rockin'" (Chuck Berry) – 2:46
17. "Come Home" (Clark, Smith) – 2:48
18. "Mighty Good Loving" (Clark, Davidson) – 2:39
19. "Hurting Inside" (Clark, Smith) – 2:37
20. "Having a Wild Weekend" (Clark, Smith) – 1:50
21. "Till the Right One Comes Along" (Clark, Smith) – 1:54
22. "Catch Us If You Can" (Clark, Davidson) – 1:54
23. "I'll Be Yours My Love" (Clark, Smith) – 2:42
24. "I Am on My Own" (Clark, Davidson) – 2:31
25. "I Need Love" (Clark, Smith) – 3:40

Disc two

1. "Try Too Hard" (Clark, Smith) – 2:07
2. "All Night Long" (Clark, Denis Payton) – 3:09
3. "Look Before You Leap" (Clark, Davidson) – 2:17
4. "Please Tell Me Why" (Clark, Smith) – 1:31
5. "Somebody Find a New Love" (Clark, Davidson) – 2:00
6. "Satisfied with You" (Clark, Payton) – 1:55
7. "At the Scene" (Clark, Davidson) – 1:50
8. "I Miss You" (Clark, Payton) – 2:11
9. "Do You Still Love Me" (Clark, Payton) – 2:01
10. "Nineteen Days" (Clark, Payton) – 1:48
11. "I've Got to Have a Reason" (Clark, Davidson) – 1:51
12. "I Like It Like That" (Chris Kenner, Allen Toussaint) – 1:37
13. "Over and Over" (Byrd) – 1:58
14. "You Got What It Takes" (Gordy, Gwen Gordy Fuqua, Roquel Davis) – 2:58
15. "Doctor Rhythm" (Clark, Smith) – 2:45
16. "Small Talk" (Clark, Smith) – 2:19
17. "Concentration Baby" (Clark, Smith) – 2:30
18. "Everybody Knows" (Les Reed, Barry Mason) – 2:18
19. "Inside and Out" (Clark, Smith) – 2:52
20. "At the Place" (Clark, Davidson) – 2:23
21. "Best Day's Work" (Clark, Smith) – 2:35
22. "Maze of Love" (Clark, Smith) – 2:36
23. "Here Comes Summer" (Jerry Keller) – 2:47
24. "Live in the Sky" (Clark, Smith) – 2:41
25. "Everybody Get Together" (Chester Powers) – 3:19

== Personnel ==
The Dave Clark Five

- Dave Clark – drums, percussion, vocals
- Mike Smith – lead vocals, piano, organ
- Denis Payton – tenor sax, baritone sax, harmonica, acoustic guitar, vocals
- Rick Huxley – bass guitar, acoustic guitar, vocals
- Lenny Davidson – lead guitar, acoustic guitar, vocals

Technical

- Dave Clark – original recording producer, remastering, compiler, compilation producer
- Ken Barnes – liner notes
