= Thinking of You Baby =

- Danish picture sleeve

Single by the Dave Clark Five
- B-side: "Whenever You're Around"
- Released: 31 July 1964
- Recorded: 1964
- Studio: Lansdowne, London
- Genre: Rhythm and blues; rock
- Length: 2:31
- Label: Columbia
- Songwriters: Dave Clark; Mike Smith
- Producer: Adrian Clark

The Dave Clark Five UK singles chronology
"Can't You See That She's Mine" (1964)	"Thinking of You Baby" (1964)	"Any Way You Want It" (1964)

Audio
- "Thinking of You Baby" on YouTube

"Thinking of You Baby" is a song written by Dave Clark and Mike Smith, first recorded by their band the Dave Clark Five in 1964. A rhythm and blues and rock song, it was produced by Clark with engineer Adrian Kerridge. Released as a single by the Columbia Graphophone Company in the UK on 31 July 1964, it was a relative commercial failure, only reaching number 26 on the Record Retailer singles chart. Despite performing the song in the 1964 film Get Yourself a College Girl, "Thinking of You Baby" was not released as a single in the US. Upon release, the single received mixed reviews, with some journalists pointing out the strengths of the instrumental backing, whereas others felt it wasn't as strong as their previous singles.

== Composition and recording ==
As with the Dave Clark Five's previous three British top-ten singles "Glad All Over" (1963), "Bits and Pieces", and "Can't You See That She's Mine" (both 1964), "Thinking of You Baby" was written by drummer Dave Clark and keyboardist Mike Smith. With a runtime of 2:31, biographer Ken Barnes classifies "Thinking of You Baby" as a "driving-type" song inspired by the likes of Tommy Tucker's "Hi-Heel Sneakers" (1963). Similarly, music critic Richie Unterberger describes the track as a "jittery good-time rocker". The single reviewer for Record Mirror instead opined it had a "predominantly R & B-styled beat". As with the rest of the Dave Clark Five's 1960s output, "Thinking of You Baby" was recorded at Lansdowne Studios in London with Adrian Kerridge engineering. The original single release credits "Adrian Clark" as the producer, which was a pseudonym used jointly by Clark and Kerridge.

== Release and commercial performance ==
The Columbia Graphophone Company released "Thinking of You Baby" as a single in Britain on 31 July 1964. The B-side, "Whenever You're Around", had previously been released in the US on their album American Tour on 20 July. The Dave Clark Five were booked and appeared on shows such as Scene at 6:30 (28 July), Top of the Pops (29 July), and Lucky Stars - Summer Spin (22 August) to promote the single's release in the UK. In the US, "Thinking of You Baby" was not released as a single, as their US label Epic Records released "Because", the B-side of their previous British single "Can't You See That She's Mine", in its place as a single A-side on 13 July 1964.

"Thinking of You Baby" entered the Record Retailer singles chart at number 31 on 19 August 1964, before peaking at number 26 the following week. It spent a mere four weeks on the charts, compared to their prior three hits, that had spent eleven weeks or more. On the other British national charts, "Thinking of You Baby" fared best on the Melody Maker Top 50, where it reached number 22. Outside of Britain, the single reached number 48 in Australia, and number ten in Sweden. Regarding the single's relative chart failure, songwriter Mitch Murray opined it was because "they have been writing themselves some very poor songs" which was why they weren't "having the success they should". The writer for Pop Weekly on the other hand, believed the chart failure stemmed from the song's genre, as both "Thinking of You Baby" and "Can't You See That She's Mine" "suffered chartwise" which they believe was "due only to the song[s] and the style", opining that the band should have alternated between "slow" and "fast" songs for their A-side releases.

In the US, the Dave Clark Five appeared in the "quasi-comic" Sidney Miller film Get Yourself a College Girl performing both "Thinking of You Baby" and "Whenever You're Around", and the songs both appeared on the movie's soundtrack album together with tracks by the Animals, Stan Getz, and Astrud Gilberto. Other than that, "Thinking of You Baby" "somehow had eluded US release for nearly three years" until it appeared on their studio album You Got What It Takes, which Epic released on 26 June 1967. It has since appeared on compilation albums by the bands, including the 1993 retrospective The History of The Dave Clark Five. For the 2026 box set Glad All Over the World: The Hits and Albums Volume 1 (1964–1965), "Thinking of You Baby" was featured in place of "Funny" on an altered version of their second US album The Dave Clark Five Return! (1964).

== Critical reception ==
Writing for Disc, Don Nicholl felt that "Thinking of You Baby" represented a "change of pace" that would attract "even strict R & B fans". He believed it was close to being a "boppity blues" and that its "urgent" arrangement was "well-maintained". Nicholl opined that the single was "bound to pay off", owing to the "boarse chant" and "precise instrumental work" which "hammered away". The reviewer for Record Mirror felt that the single was "fast moving heavy danceable item", with a backing track that was "reminiscent" of the works of Marvin Gaye, believing it would be a "bigger hit" than his previous single. He believed it was "certainly well up to their standard". On the contrary, Peter Aldersley of Pop Weekly felt that "Thinking of You Baby" did not have "the same power of impact" as the band's previous singles, despite it being a "well-produced disc" that was "interesting to listen to".

Retrospectively, Unterberger believed that "Thinking of You Baby" represented an "indictment" to the Dave Clark's Five inability to "advance much creatively", as he believed that the song was one of You Got What It Takes best songs, despite being nearly three years old at the time.

== Charts ==
Weekly chart performance for "Thinking of You Baby"
Chart (1964)	Peak position
Australia (Kent Music Report)	48
Sweden (Tio i Topp)	10
UK (Disc Top 30)	27
UK (Melody Maker Top 50)	22
UK (New Musical Express Top 30)	23
UK (Record Retailer Top 50)	26
