= Catch Us If You Can =

- Swedish single sleeve

Single by the Dave Clark Five

from the album Having a Wild Weekend
- B-side: "Move On" (UK); "On The Move" (US)
- Released: 2 July 1965 (UK); 5 August 1965 (US)
- Recorded: 1965
- Studio: Lansdowne, London
- Genre: Rock
- Length: 1:54
- Label: Columbia
- Songwriters: Dave Clark; Lenny Davidson
- Producer: Dave Clark

The Dave Clark Five UK singles chronology
"Come Home" (1965)	"Catch Us If You Can" (1965)	"Over and Over" (1965)

The Dave Clark Five US singles chronology
"I Like It Like That" (1965)	"Catch Us If You Can" (1965)	"Over and Over" (1965)

Official lyric video
- "Catch Us If You Can" on YouTube

"Catch Us If You Can" is a 1965 song by the Dave Clark Five, written by the group's drummer Dave Clark and guitarist Lenny Davidson. After their success had waned slightly in the UK, the Dave Clark Five focused on the US. There, Clark met with Jack L. Warner and developed the 1965 film of the same name. "Catch Us If You Can" was inspired by Mary Wells and Major Lance, and was recorded at Lansdowne Studios in London with audio engineer Adrian Kerridge and production by Clark. Musically, "Catch Us If You Can" features a sparse arrangement during the opening and verses that feature prominent finger snapping and a harmonica solo, which was rare on a record by the band. Lyrically, the song features elements of youth liberation and anti-establishment.

The initial release of "Catch Us If You Can" was on the American soundtrack album Having a Wild Weekend on 28 June 1965. Shortly before Catch Us If You Can (retitled Having a Wild Weekend in the US) premiered, "Catch Us If You Can" was released as a single A-side in the UK on 2 July 1965 through Columbia Records, and on 5 August 1965 through Epic Records in the US. It was a commercial success, reaching number five on the Record Retailer chart in the UK, where it was their first top-ten single in over a year. The single was also number four on the US Billboard Hot 100 in addition to reaching the top-ten in various other countries. Critically, the song was praised for being a "rocker", but criticized for having a more commercial sound than their previous singles. Retrospectively, the song has received critical acclaim and influenced various songwriters.

== Background and composition ==
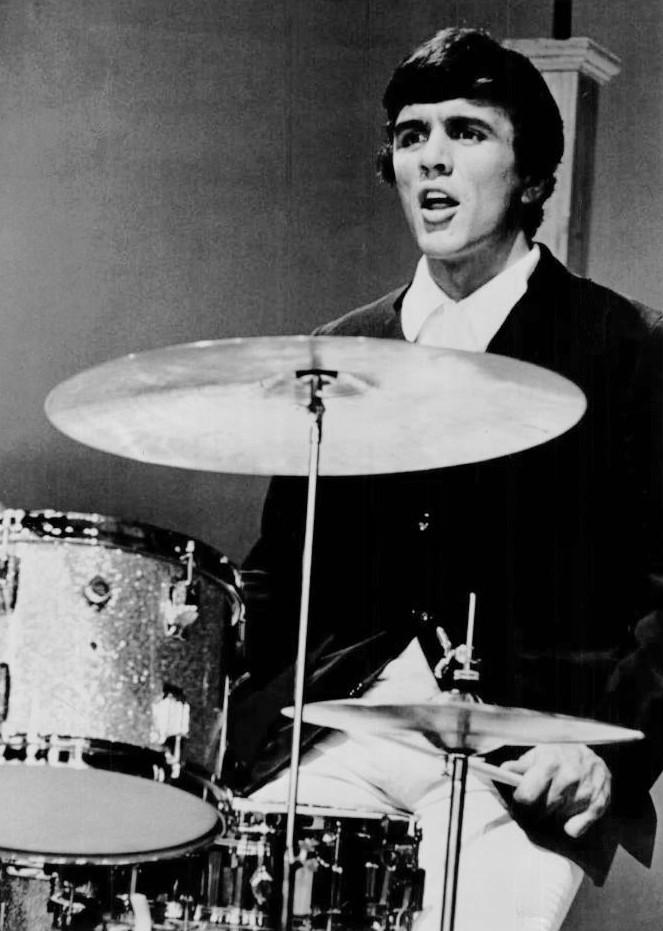
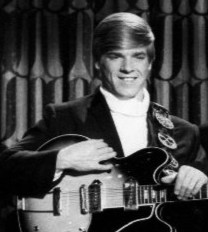
"Catch Us If You Can" was written by drummer Dave Clark and guitarist Lenny Davidson.

In 1964, the Dave Clark Five broke through in England, scoring three consecutive top-ten singles with "Glad All Over" (1963), "Bits and Pieces" and "Can't You See That She's Mine" (both 1964). According to Jim Beviglia, their initial burst of success there "tailed off a bit", leading to their focus on the US in the wake of the British Invasion, where in 1964 and 1965 they were selling "selling a million records a month". They had already starred in the film Get Yourself a College Girl (1964), when drummer Dave Clark was contacted by Jack L. Warner, who wanted to contract the band for a three-film deal as his daughter was a fan. Though Clark turned down the offer, it was agreed that they would star in one motion picture directed by John Boorman as long as it was "ready for the drive-ins" by the summer of 1965.

The song's composition was conceptualized by Clark, who came up with the track's hook and finger snapping, the latter of which were conceived in a "Mary Wells / Major Lance-type feel". Clark then consulted the band's vocalist Mike Smith and saxophonis Denis Payton for ideas, though it was guitarist Lenny Davidson "who was going in the direction" Clark was aiming for with the song. As with the Dave Clark Five's other output from the 1960s, "Catch Us If You Can" was recorded at Lansdowne Studios in Holland Park. Present in the studio was audio engineer Adrian Kerridge, who also "recorded most of the band's early core hit catalog". The song was produced by Dave Clark himself.

As recorded by the Dave Clark Five, "Catch Us If You Can" contains a running time of one minute and fifty-four seconds, and was written in the key of G major. The song opens with a "two-note ascending riff" performed on an acoustic guitar alongside finger snaps, something that AllMusic critic Richie Unterberger characterizes as "unusually spare" by the band's standards. The hook featuring the fingersnapping "anchors half the song" whereas the song's refrain turns into a "shaggy rocker" that features a full band performance with the "expected saxophone and layers of harmony vocals pile on with force". The transition between the song's verse and bridge features a similar drum roll to the band's other hits. Unusually for a Dave Clark Five song, "Catch Us If You Can" features a "bluesy" harmonica solo performed by Payton, rather than an organ or a saxophone. Lyrically, Beviglia identifies the song as a "kind of a youth anthem" despite its incomprehensible lyrics, as does Unterberger, who further considered it to feature anti-establishment themes.

== Release and commercial performance ==
"Catch Us If You Can" had its first commercial release as an album track on their US album Having a Wild Weekend, issued on 28 June 1965 ahead of the film. In the UK, "Catch Us If You Can" was issued as a single A-side on 2 July 1965 through Columbia Records backed by the song "Move On", (Note: Catalogue number DB 7625.) which had originally been released on their US album American Tour on 20 July 1964. The film Catch Us If You Can premiered in England a week later, on 8 July 1965. In the UK, the song was additionally released as the opening track of their second album Catch Us If You Can in 1965. In the US, where the movie was retitled Having A Wild Weekend, (Note: In the US, the film was re-titled after the title track to the Having a Wild Weekend LP, as a cancelled Broadway theatre play with the title Catch Us If You Can had already been trademarked three months prior to the film's release.) "Catch Us If You Can" was released as a single on 5 August 1965 through Epic Records. (Note: Catalogue number 9833.) The B-side of the single in America was "On The Move", which had also been taken from the Having a Wild Weekend soundtrack. In the US, the film premiered on 13 August 1965.

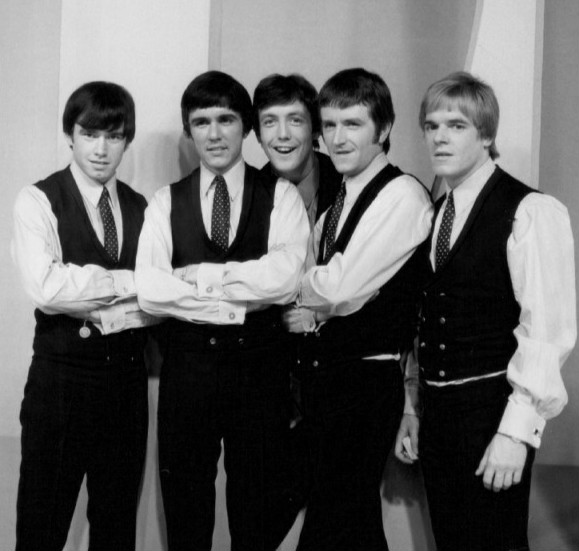
"Catch Us If You Can" was the Dave Clark Five's first British top-ten single in a year.

"Catch Us If You Can" entered the charts published by Record Retailer in the UK on 21 July 1965 at a position of 38, before achieving its highest chart position of number five on 18 August. It dropped out of the charts after 11 weeks on 29 September at a position of 40. "Catch Us If You Can" was the Dave Clark Five's first top-ten single in Britain since "Can't You See That She's Mine" in June 1964, and their last until "Everybody Knows" in November 1967. According to Beviglia, "Catch Us If You Can" broke the trend of Dave Clark Five's declining chart success in the UK. In the US, "Catch Us If You Can" debuted on the Billboard Hot 100 at number 62 on 21 August 1965, before peaking at number four on 25 September 1965. It dropped out on 30 October at a position of 40, having spent 11 weeks on the chart. In the US, "Catch Us If You Can" was one of seventeen top-40 hits the Dave Clark Five scored between 1964 and 1967. Elsewhere in the world, the single also reached the top-ten in various countries; number five in Canada and South Africa, number seven in Rhodesia, and number nine in Sweden. Despite this, the single fared better in Southeast Asia, where it reached number two in Singapore and number four in Malaysia.

By October 1965, "Catch Us If You Can" had sold one million copies worldwide, becoming the band's eighth million-selling single. In addition to appearing on Having a Wild Weekend and Catch Us If You Can in the US and UK respectively, "Catch Us If You Can" was also included on most of the Dave Clark Five's compilation albums, such as The Dave Clark Five's Greatest Hits (1966), which reached number nine on the US Billboard 200; 25 Thumping Great Hits (1978), which reached number seven on the UK Albums Chart; Glad All Over Again and The History of The Dave Clark Five (both 1993); The Hits (2008); and All The Hits (2020).

== Reception and legacy ==
Upon initial release, "Catch Us If You Can" received favourable reviews in the British press. Writing for Disc Weekly, journalist Penny Valentine noted the contrasting verses and choruses, finding them clever. She praised Smith's vocal delivery as "raucous", and stated it to be a hit, especially because it was "from their film". In a blind date for magazine Melody Maker, Welsh singer Lulu identified it as a blend between the Dave Clark Five and the Hollies, particularly the drumming. She found it good and predicted it to be a hit, though she believed "nothing after Elvis" surprised her. Somewhat more negatively, Derek Johnson of the New Musical Express found the song "inconsequential" and doubted its chances of becoming a hit if it "wasn't for the film", despite having believed the song to be "gay, bright and breezy" and "good dance material". Norman Jopling and Peter Jones found "Catch Us If You Can" to "move like mad after the opening bars", though he stated it was more commercial than their previous offerings. He praised Payton's harmonica solo and stated that "it could do Dave a lot of good in the charts.

"Catch Us if You Can" was not only one of the biggest Dave Clark Five hits, getting to number four in 1965, but is also probably the one that's most respected by critics (inasmuch as rock critics pay any serious attention to the DC5).

— Richie Unterberger about "Catch Us If You Can"

Amongst reviewers from the US, Billboard described the song as a "pulsating rocker" which was a "smash follow-up" to their previous US single "I Like It Like That" (1965). Cash Box described it as a "rollicking, fast-moving rocker with a contagious, funky rhythmic undercurrent," and believed it had potential to become a "blockbuster" in the US in the way it was in the UK. Record World wrote that the single "moves and grooves for the groovy movers."

Retrospectively, "Catch Us If You Can" was one of ten pop singles named in a January 1966 issue of Billboard which credited the use of harmonica in folk, pop, and rhythm and blues music for sparking a harmonica sales boom at record retailers in 1964 and 1965. According to Richie Unterberger, "Catch Us If You Can" was most likely the Dave Clark Five song that received the most respect from music critics, and also stated it to be a more "cleverly constructed" song with a more "explicit rebellion" in the lyrics in comparison to their earlier singles. Jim Beviglia stated that the song's title was a deliberate "dare to the world" for people to keep up with the Dave Clark Five, as few of their peers could keep up with the success they enjoyed". It has been suggested that The Monkees' "(Theme From) The Monkees" (1966) was influenced by "Catch Us If You Can"; according to Clark, he received a letter from that song's writers Tommy Boyce and Bobby Hart years in which it was stated that "(Theme From) The Monkees" was plagiarized from "Catch Us If You Can". (Note: The Dave Clark Five were allegedly offered – though declined – to star in the show that eventually became The Monkees.)

== Charts ==
=== Weekly charts ===
Chart (1965)	Peak position
Australia (Kent Music Report)	18
Canada (RPM)	5
Hong Kong (RHK)	6
Malaysia (Radio Malaysia)	4
Netherlands (Dutch Top 40)	25
Rhodesia (Lyons Maid)	7
Singapore (Radio Singapore)	2
South Africa (Springbok Radio)	5
Sweden (Tio i Topp)	9
UK (Disc Weekly)	4
UK (New Musical Express)	4
UK (Melody Maker)	5
UK (Record Retailer)	5
US (Billboard Hot 100)	4
US (Cash Box Top 100)	6
US (Record World 100 Top Pops)	5

=== Year-end charts ===
Chart (1965)	Peak position
UK (Record Retailer)	73
US (Billboard)	54
US (Cash Box)	79
