= Catch Us If You Can (album) =

1965 studio album by the Dave Clark Five

Soundtrack album by the Dave Clark Five
- Released: 6 August 1965
- Studios: Lansdowne, London
- Genres: Pop rock; beat
- Length: 29:59
- Label: Columbia
- Producer: Dave Clark

The Dave Clark Five UK chronology
A Session with The Dave Clark Five (1964)	Catch Us If You Can (1965)	The Dave Clark Five's Greatest Hits (1966)

Singles from Catch Us If You Can
- 1. "Catch Us If You Can" Released: 2 July 1965

Catch Us If You Can is the second UK studio album by the Dave Clark Five, released by Columbia Records on 6 August 1965. A soundtrack album, it serves as the soundtrack to the film of the same name. The tracks featured had all previously been featured on American studio albums by the band. Catch Us If You Can reached number eight on the Record Retailer albums chart and received positive reviews by critics

== Recording and musical content ==
As with the rest of the Dave Clark Five's original output, the album was recorded at Lansdowne Studios in London and engineered by Adrian Kerridge. In contrast to the band's debut album A Session with The Dave Clark Five, which was produced by Clark and Kerridge under the pseudonym "Adrian Clark", production for the tracks on the Catch Me If You Can album were credited to Clark alone. At the time, Clark had a tendency to stockpile recordings for later release; in an interview with Alan Smith of the New Musical Express around the time of the album's release, Clark revealed that he had "about 18 tracks in the can", ready for release "at the right moment".

Though the album marked the first UK issue for most of the tracks, all of them had previously been released in the US. "Long Ago", "Anytime You Want Love", and "I Cried Over You" were all originally released on their third US album American Tour on 20 July 1964. "I Can't Stand It" dates from their fourth US album Coast to Coast, released on 21 December 1964; and "Your Turn to Cry" and "Hurtin' Inside" were pulled from their fifth album Weekend in London, released on 1 March 1965. The remaining six tracks were pulled from their sixth US studio album Having a Wild Weekend, which was the US soundtrack album for the movie, and released on 28 June 1965.

== Release ==
Though initially scheduled for release on 30 July 1965, Columbia Records released the Catch Us If You Can soundtrack on 6 August 1965. This had been preceded by the release of the title track as a single on 2 July, and by the film itself which went on general release in the UK on 25 July. The Catch Us If You Can album subsequently charted, entering the Record Retailer albums chart at number 17 on 14 August 1965, before peaking at number eight for two consecutive weeks starting on 21 August. It exited at number 15 on 2 October, having spent eight weeks on the charts. On the national albums charts published by Melody Maker, it also reached number 8. Catch Us If You Can was the final studio album by the Dave Clark Five to chart in the UK.

== Critical reception ==
Professional ratings
Review scores
Source	Rating
New Musical Express	4/4 stars
Record Mirror	4/4 stars

Writing for the New Musical Express, Allen Evans expressed doubt to the album's status as a soundtrack, stating that it contained "more vocals from the [Dave Clark] Five" than "found in the film", alongside a few titles he "didn't remember being in the film". Nonetheless, he found the album to have "plenty of swinging beat" both instrumentally and vocally, and awarded it four out of four stars. In Record Mirror, the staff reviewer writes that Catch Us If You Can was a "real do-it-yourselves-style album" as it switched from film tracks to "other originals". They praised the guitar on "Hurtin' Inside a" and the "nicely balanced vocal touches" on "Your Turn to Cry" and felt that the "over-emphasized" bass work was "weirdly effective". Though they note the songs as having a "similarity of tempo" at several instances, they believe it works as this is where the band "sound the most comfortable". They believed the album to be "bang-up-to-date" and "nicely varied".

== Track listing ==
All songs written by Dave Clark and Lenny Davidson unless otherwise noted.

Side one

1. "Catch Us If You Can" – 1:54
2. "On The Move" (Dave Clark, Denis Payton) – 2:22
3. "If You Come Back" – 2:50
4. "Long Ago" – 2:12
5. "Anytime You Want Love" – 2:12
6. "I Can't Stand It" – 1:22

Side two

1. "Your Turn to Cry" (Clark, Mike Smith) – 3:13
2. "Hurtin' Inside" (Clark, Smith) – 2:39
3. "Don't Be Taken In" – 2:23
4. "Don't You Realize" (Clark, Smith) – 3:38
5. "I Cried Over You" – 2:29
6. "Sweet Memories" – 2:45

== Charts ==
Weekly chart performance for Catch Us If You Can
Chart (1965)	Peak position
UK Melody Maker Top Ten LPs	8
UK New Musical Express Top Ten LPs	8
UK Record Retailer LPs Chart	8

== References and sources ==
Notes

Citations

Sources

- Anon. (2008). The Hits (CD). Europe: Universal Music Group. 1781774 – via MusicBrainz.
- Barnes, Ken (1993). The History of the Dave Clark Five (CD). United States: Hollywood Records. HR-61482-2 – via MusicBrainz.
