= Glad All Over Again =

Compilation album by The Dave Clark Five
- Released: 1993
- Recorded: 1964–1970
- Genre: Rock
- Label: EMI
- Producers: Dave Clark, Adrian Kerridge (using the pseudonym Adrian Clark)

Professional ratings
Review scores
Source	Rating
Allmusic	4.5/5 stars

Glad All Over Again is a compilation album by the Dave Clark Five, released in 1993.

== Track listing ==
1. "Glad All Over" (Dave Clark, Mike Smith) – 2:41
2. "Do You Love Me" (Berry Gordy, Jr.) – 2:25
3. "Bits and Pieces" (Clark, Smith, Ron Ryan) – 1:59
4. "Can't You See That She's Mine" (Clark, Smith) – 2:21
5. "Don't Let Me Down" (Clark, Smith) – 1:41
6. "Everybody Knows (I Still Love You)" (Clark, Lenny Davidson) – 1:42
7. "Any Way You Want It" (Clark) – 2:40
8. "Catch Us If You Can" (Clark, Davidson) – 1:55
9. "Having a Wild Weekend" (Clark, Smith) – 1:42
10. "Because" (Clark) – 2:24
11. "I Like It Like That" (Allen Toussaint, Chris Kenner) – 1:38
12. "Over and Over" (Robert Byrd) – 2:01
13. "Reelin' and Rockin'" (Chuck Berry) – 2:48
14. "Come Home" (Clark, Smith) – 2:51
15. "You Got What It Takes" (Tyran Carlo, Gwen Fuqua, Gordy Jr., Marv Johnson) – 3:00
16. "Everybody Knows" (Barry Mason, Les Reed) – 2:23
17. "Try Too Hard" (Clark, Smith) – 2:09
18. "I'll Be Yours My Love" (Clark, Smith) – 2:42
19. "Good Old Rock & Roll" – 3:48
  - "Good Old Rock and Roll"
  - "Sweet Little Sixteen" (Chuck Berry)
  - "Long Tall Sally" (Enotris Johnson, Robert Blackwell, Richard Penniman)
  - "Chantilly Lace" (JP Richardson)
  - "Whole Lotta Shakin' Goin' On" (Dave "Curlee" Williams)
  - "Blue Suede Shoes" (Carl Perkins)
20. "Here Comes Summer" (Jerry Keller) – 2:48
21. "Live in the Sky" (Clark, Smith) – 2:42
22. "The Red Balloon" (Raymond Froggatt) –
23. "Sha-Na-Na Hey Hey Kiss Him Goodbye" (Paul Leka, Gary DeCarlo, Dale Frashuer) – 3:19
24. "More Good Old Rock & Roll" – 2:58
  - "Rock n' Roll Music" (Berry)
  - "Blueberry Hill" (Larry Stock, Al Lewis, Vincent Rose)
  - "Good Golly Miss Molly" (John Marascalco, Robert "Bumps" Blackwell)
  - "My Blue Heaven" (Walter Donaldson, George A. Whiting)
  - "Keep a Knockin'" (Penniman)
25. "Put a Little Love In Your Heart" (Jackie DeShannon, Jimmy Holiday, Randy Myers) – 2:59
26. "Everybody Get Together" (Chet Powers) – 3:18

== Personnel ==
=== The Dave Clark Five ===
- Dave Clark – backing and occasional lead vocals, drums
- Mike Smith – lead vocals, keyboards
- Lenny Davidson – backing and occasional lead vocals, lead and rhythm guitars
- Rick Huxley – backing vocals, bass guitar, rhythm guitar
- Denis Payton – backing and occasional lead vocals, tenor and baritone saxophones, harmonica, rhythm guitar

=== Technical ===
- Dave Clark – producer
- Adrian Clark – producer (track 7)
- Andy Engel – cover design
- Hank Parker – photography
