= The Dave Clark Five (album) =

Compilation album by Dave Clark Five
- Released: 1971
- Genres: Pop rock, Beat
- Length: 50:20
- Label: Epic EG 30434
- Producers: Adrian Clark (pseudonym for Dave Clark and Adrian Kerridge)

Dave Clark Five chronology
Everybody Knows (1968)	The Dave Clark Five (1971)	Glad All Over Again (1975)

Professional ratings
Review scores
Source	Rating
Allmusic	2.5/5 stars

The Dave Clark Five is a US-only compilation double-album by The Dave Clark Five. The double-LP was released in 1971 three years after the group's last US studio album entitled Everybody Knows. It features 20 studio tracks in true stereo.

As all but the group's last three commercial US albums were issued in re-channeled stereo, fifteen tracks make their U.S. true stereo debut in this two-disc package, the exceptions being "Good Love Is Hard To Find", "Sitting Here Baby", "Inside and Out", "Concentration Baby" and "Bernedette". "Glad All Over", "Can't You See That She's Mine", "Try Too Hard", "Because" and "Come Home" had made their first true stereo appearances on the 1970 EMI Regal Starline LP The Best Of The Dave Clark Five.

Side note: The true stereo mix of "Try Too Hard" suffers from speed problems near the end of the song. This occurs on every available true stereo release of the recording.

== Track listing ==
All tracks written by Dave Clark & Mike Smith except as noted

=== Side one ===
1. "Glad All Over" - 2:43
2. "Can't You See That She's Mine" - 2:22
3. "I Need Love" - 3:39
4. "Good Love Is Hard To Find" - 2:09
5. "Try Too Hard" - 2:10

=== Side two ===
1. "Because" - 2:23 (Dave Clark)
2. "'Til The Right One Comes Along" - 2:15
3. "Whenever You're Around" - 2:59
4. "Remember, It's Me" - 2:23
5. "When I'm Alone" - 2:35

=== Side three ===
1. "Having a Wild Weekend" - 1:52
2. "Sitting Here Baby" - 2:59
3. "Concentration Baby" - 2:34
4. "Please Tell Me Why" - 1:35
5. "Inside and Out" - 2:51

=== Side four ===
1. "Come Home" - 2:51
2. "I'll Be Yours My Love" - 2:43
3. "Forever and a Day" - 2:13
4. "Bernedette" - 2:19
5. "Hurting Inside" - 2:41
