= A Session with The Dave Clark Five =

Studio album by the Dave Clark Five
- Released: 10 April 1964
- Recorded: 1964
- Studios: Lansdowne, London
- Genres: Pop rock; beat
- Length: 27:28
- Label: Columbia
- Producer: Adrian Clark

The Dave Clark Five UK chronology
A Session with The Dave Clark Five (1964)	Catch Us If You Can (1965)

Singles from A Session with The Dave Clark Five
- 1. "Can't You See That She's Mine" Released: 22 May 1964

A Session with The Dave Clark Five is the UK debut studio album by the English pop rock band the Dave Clark Five, released in the United Kingdom on 10 April 1964 through EMI's Columbia Records. The album was recorded at Lansdowne Studios and produced by drummer Dave Clark and engineer Adrian Kerridge under the pseudonym "Adrian Clark". Musically, the album is thematically diverse, with nine out of 12 tracks penned by the band members. A Session with The Dave Clark Five features three cover songs, including the much-requested "Zip-a-Dee-Doo-Dah"

Entering the Record Retailer albums chart a week after release, A Session with The Dave Clark reached number three for a week in May 1964, becoming the band's highest charting album in their homeland. It also produced the hit single "Can't You See That She's Mine" that reached number ten on the Record Retailer singles chart. A Session with The Dave Clark Five also reached number three in Canada. In the US, the album was not released, and material appeared on their US albums Glad All Over and The Dave Clark Five Return!. Upon release, it received favourable reviews, though has been retrospectively criticized as "weak".

== Production and musical content ==
According to Dave Clark, A Session with The Dave Clark Five was recorded in a single day. The album's production was credited to "Adrian Clark", a collective pseudonym used by Clark and Lansdowne Studios engineer Adrian Kerridge. The album was mixed and released in monaural sound only. As the Lansdowne Studios was equipped with only a four-track recorder, Clark recalled that the string quartet present on a few of the album's songs had to essentially play "live" with the Dave Clark Five. Arrangement of the strings was done by bandleader Les Reed.

According to Record Collector's Alan Clayson, A Session with The Dave Clark Five "covered many styles", including modern jazz. Nine out of the album's 12 tracks were composed by members of the band. Clark wrote "Can I Trust You" and "Time" by himself and co-wrote the other original compositions with the other band members; five with keyboardist Mike Smith, "Funny" with saxophonist Denis Payton and "Theme Without a Name" with guitarist Lenny Davidson. Of the covers, "Zip-a-Dee-Doo-Dah" was included as the band received "lots of requests for it". "On Broadway" had originally been recorded by the Drifters. The third cover, Link Wray's "Rumble" was one of the album's three instrumental songs, the others being "Theme Without a Name" and the jazzy "Time".

== Release and commercial performance ==
In the UK, Clark leased the tapes to EMI, who released A Session with The Dave Clark Five as an album through their Columbia sublabel on 10 April 1964. It entered the Record Retailer's album chart at number 19 on 18 April 1964, before peaking at number three for a single week on 23 May 1964. It dropped out of the chart on 15 August 1964 at a position of 19, having spent 18 weeks on the chart. In the UK, it was the highest charting album by the Dave Clark Five. The album also reached number three on the national album charts published by Melody Maker and the New Musical Express. At the advice of record label executives at EMI, the album's opening track "Can't You See That She's Mine" was released as a single on 22 May 1964, and reached number ten on the Record Retailer's singles chart in the UK.

In Canada, A Session With The Dave Clark Five was issued by Capitol Records, and reached number three on the CHUM Chart's Album Index during May 1964. In the US, A Session with The Dave Clark Five was not released, and the album's tracks appeared on various US releases; "She's All Mine" and "Time" appeared on their US debut album Glad All Over, which Epic Records released on 17 March 1964. The remaining ten songs were released with a "slightly different" track listing on their second American album The Dave Clark Five Return!, released on 22 May 1964. A Session with The Dave Clark Five itself was reissued in 1968 through the EMI Music for Pleasure budget record label, but as of 2008, has not appeared officially on CD. Similarly, no stereo mix of the album has turned up.

== Critical reception ==
Professional ratings
Review scores
Source	Rating
Disc	4/5 stars
AllMusic	2.5/5 stars

Writing for Beat Instrumental, Dave Gell opined that the album was a good representation of Dave Clark and Mike Smith's songwriting talent. He additionally praised the band's musical abilities, particularly noting that Smith is "well-represented" on the organ. He added that the LP's "overall effect is of a group thoroughly in love with what they're doing". Nigel Hunter of Disc felt that the band's vocal harmony abilities were "thickly effective", and that the covers were "interesting variations of the originals". Though he wrote that the album was a "commercial fare that would rock the charts", he rated it 4 out 5 stars, stating that it lost a star for the "certain amount of excess from the 'organ-and-guitars routine".

In a retrospective review for AllMusic, music critic Bruce Eder wrote: "As the group's first venture in making an LP, it's not as strong as their later efforts, though it does show off their range around the sound that would make them international stars. The lack of the presence of a hit single, however, leaves it weaker than most of the group's American-released LPs."

== Track listing ==
Songwriting credits adapted from the original liner notes of the album.

Side one
No.	Title	Writer(s)	Length
1.	"Can't You See That She's Mine"	Dave Clark, Mike Smith	2:22
2.	"I Need You, I Love You"	Clark, Smith	2:32
3.	"I Love You No More"	Clark, Smith	2:18
4.	"Rumble"	Link Wray, Mill Grant	2:36
5.	"Funny"	Clark, Denis Payton	1:51
6.	"On Broadway"	Barry Mann, Cynthia Weil, Jerry Leiber, Mike Stoller	2:37
Total length:			14:16

Side two
No.	Title	Writer(s)	Length
1.	"Zip-a-Dee-Doo-Dah"	Allie Wrubel, Ray Gilbert	2:30
2.	"Can I Trust You"	Clark	2:05
3.	"Forever and a Day"	Clark, Smith	2:08
4.	"Theme Without a Name"	Clark, Lenny Davidson	2:01
5.	"She's All Mine"	Clark, Smith	2:11
6.	"Time"	Clark	2:17
Total length:			13:12

== Personnel ==
Credits adapted from 1968 Music for Pleasure reissue, except where noted.

The Dave Clark Five

- Dave Clark – drums
- Mike Smith – organ, lead vocals
- Lenny Davidson – guitar
- Denis Payton – tenor sax
- Rick Huxley – bass guitar

Additional personnel

- Adrian Kerridge – co-producer
- Dave Clark – co-producer, musical director (1–9, 11–12)
- Les Reed – musical director (10)
- Bruce Fleming – photography

== Charts ==
Chart (1964)	Peak position
Canadian CHUM Album Index	3
UK Melody Maker Top Ten LPs	3
UK New Musical Express Top Ten LPs	3
UK Record Retailer LPs Chart	3

== See also ==
- The Dave Clark Five discography
