= If Somebody Loves You =

Studio album by The Dave Clark Five
- Released: December 1970
- Genre: Pop rock
- Length: 39:56
- Label: Columbia; SCX 6437
- Producer: Dave Clark

The Dave Clark Five UK chronology
5 By 5 (1964–69) (1968)	If Somebody Loves You (1970)	The Dave Clark Five Play Good Old Rock & Roll (1971)

Singles from If Somebody Loves You
- 1. "Red and Blue" (US only) / "Concentration Baby"; 2. "Live in the Sky" / "Children"; 3. "If Somebody Loves You" (US only) / "Best Day's Work"; 4. "Everybody Get Together" / "Darling I Love You"; 5. "Julia" / "Five by Five"; 6. "Here Comes Summer" / "Break Down and Cry"

If Somebody Loves You is the fifth British album by the Dave Clark Five. It was released by EMI (Columbia) in 1970. The album contained four of the group's popular songs, the minor US hit "Red and Blue" (Billboard No. 89), and the successful UK singles "Live in the Sky" (No. 39), "Here Comes Summer" (No. 44), as well as the UK top 10 hit cover version of Chet Powers' "Everybody Get Together" (No. 8). A single featuring Mike Smith's ballad "Julia" had no success in the UK or the US, but reached No. 2 in Malaysia in August 1970. The album is the first to be released after the band's official breakup and was not available in the US.

== Overview ==
It is not entirely clear whether all the current band members played on all the recordings. The Dave Clark Five broke up in August 1970 (five months before the release of the album) and an official statement said that, "the band has ceased to operate as a regular recording unit. But Clark and organist Mike Smith who recently renewed their Columbia recording contract, will continue to record and release material under the group's name." It is therefore possible that some of the recordings were made by Dave Clark, Mike Smith and studio musicians. However, ten of the fourteen songs had already been released on various records before the band broke up (between November 1965 and July 1970).

All of the songs were produced by Dave Clark himself and most were written by keyboardist and vocalist Mike Smith or guitarist Lenny Davidson. Guest vocalists included Madeline Bell with a chorus of students from the Royal Central School of Speech and Drama ("Everybody Get Together") and Doris Troy ("If Somebody Loves You"). Although the band usually avoided political, religious or racial themes in their songs, they made a few exceptions here ("It Ain't What You Do", "How Do You Get To Heaven", "Worried Times"). The song "I'm On My Own" was sung by guitarist Lenny Davidson instead of the band's lead singer Mike Smith (and they both shared lead vocals on "Here Commes Summer").

== Reception ==
Professional ratings
Review scores
Source	Rating
AllMusic	3/5 stars

Disc and Music Echo magazine wrote in a 1971 review, "It's probably the best (album) the group has ever done. (...) Title track is excellent and should be released as a single. A splendid album which also features some excellent vocals from Madeline Bell.” "If Somebody Loves You" was released as a single in the United States in 1969, but was not a chart success. Dave Clark remastered the album and re-released it on Spotify in 2019.

Record World called the title track "a big commercial grabber with lots of appeal."

== Track listing ==
Side one
No.	Title	Writer(s)	Length
1.	"If Somebody Loves You"	Dave Clark, Mike Smith	2:49
2.	"It Ain't What You Do"	Dave Clark, Lenny Davidson	3:11
3.	"Live in the Sky"	Dave Clark, Mike Smith	2:49
4.	"Five by Five"	Dave Clark, Mike Smith	2:49
5.	"Here Comes Summer"	Jerry Keller	2:54
6.	"How Do You Get to Heaven"	Dave Clark, Mike Smith	3:17
7.	"Everybody Get Together"	Chet Powers	3:49

Side two
No.	Title	Writer(s)	Length
1.	"Julia"	Dave Clark, Lenny Davidson	2:29
2.	"Break Down and Cry"	Dave Clark, Mike Smith	3:03
3.	"I'm on My Own" (from the album I Like It Like That)	Dave Clark, Lenny Davidson	2:30
4.	"Red and Blue" (from the album Everybody Knows)	Dave Clark, Lenny Davidson	2:33
5.	"If You Wanna See Me Cry"	Dave Clark, Mike Smith	2:42
6.	"Worried Times"	Dave Clark, Mike Smith	2:26
7.	"Darling I Love You"	Dave Clark, Mike Smith	2:35

== First releases of individual songs ==
Although the album was not presented as a compilation, most of the songs had previously been released on UK or US LPs and singles.

Song	First release	Year
"If Somebody Loves You"	A-side single (US)	1969
"It Ain't What You Do"	If Somebody Loves You LP	1970
"Live In The Sky"	A-side single	1968
"Five By Five"	TV show "Hold On! It's The Dave Clark Five" (1968), B-side single "Julia"	1970
"Here Comes Summer"	A-side single	1970
"How Do You Get To Heaven"	If Somebody Loves You LP	1970
"Everybody Get Together"	A-side single	1970
"Julia"	A-side single	1970
"Break Down And Cry"	B-side single "Here Comes Summer"	1970
"I'm On My Own"	I Like It Like That LP	1965
"Red And Blue"	A-side single (US), Everybody Knows LP	1967
"If You Wanna See Me Cry"	If Somebody Loves You LP	1970
"Worried Times"	If Somebody Loves You LP	1970
"Darling I Love You"	B-side single "Bring It On Home to Me" (US)	1969

== Personnel ==
The Dave Clark Five

- Dave Clark - drums, backing vocals
- Mike Smith - lead vocals, keyboards
- Lenny Davidson - lead guitar, backing vocals; lead vocals on "I'm On My Own" and "Here Comes Summer"
- Rick Huxley - bass, backing vocals
- Denis Payton - tenor saxophone, rhythm guitar, backing vocals

Additional musicians

- Madeline Bell - backing vocals
- Doris Troy - backing vocals
