= Glad All Over (disambiguation) =

"Glad All Over" is a 1963 song by The Dave Clark Five.

Glad All Over may also refer to:

- Glad All Over (Dave Clark Five album), 1964
- "Glad All Over" (Carl Perkins song), 1957
- Glad All Over (The Wallflowers album), 2012
