= I Like It Like That (Dave Clark Five album) =

Studio album by the Dave Clark Five
- Released: 15 November 1965
- Genre: Pop rock
- Length: 29:30
- Labels: Epic; LN 24178 / BN 26178
- Producer: Dave Clark

The Dave Clark Five US chronology
Having a Wild Weekend (1965)	I Like It Like That (1965)	Try Too Hard (1966)

Singles from I Like It Like That
- 1. "I Like It Like That" / "Hurting Inside" Released: 4 June 1965

I Like It Like That is the seventh American album by the British band the Dave Clark Five. It was released on 15 November 1965 and was the follow-up to the successful top-ten single of the same name. The LP reached the Billboard and Cashbox charts.

== Overview ==
The album combined rock songs ("I Need Love", "I Like It Like That") with catchy rhythmic ballads ("That's How Long Our Love Will Last", "I'll Be Yours My Love") and mid-tempo rockers ("She's A Loving Girl", "You Know You're Lying"). The LP was produced by Dave Clark and all the songs were written by members of the band (with the exception of the hit "I Like It Like That" written by Chris Kenner and Allen Toussaint). Although no one from the band has officially confirmed it, it is widely believed that studio drummer Bobby Graham took part in the recording sessions. The song "I'm On My Own" was sung by guitarist Lenny Davidson instead of the band's lead singer Mike Smith. The photo on the album cover art came from the same photo session as a similar image on the cover of their first American album Glad All Over. The sleeve note was written by Myles Eiten, Pop Record Editor of Ingenue magazine. The album was not released in the UK. Canada was the only other country where it was available under the different title "Over And Over" and contained a hit single of the same name. "I Like It Like That" LP was unavailable for many years before it was remastered and re-released by Dave Clark in 2019 on Spotify.

== Reception ==
Professional ratings
Review scores
Source	Rating
AllMusic	2.5/5 stars

The album was a success for the band and reached No. 32 on the Billboard album chart and No. 41 on Cashbox. Billboard magazine wrote, "The group offers a program of pulsating rockers mixed with sensitive, tender ballads which insure this hot package of being their seventh hit LP in a row. That's How Long Our Love Will Last is a prime example of the fine ballad performance of the group."

In a retrospective review published on AllMusic, music critic Bruce Eder wrote, "The group's sixth American album shows them in somewhat uneven form, delivering the searing I Need Love, with its roaring punk defiance - worthy of Eric Burdon - in addition to the roaring title track, as good a British take on New Orleans-style R&B as there was on the charts in those days."

== Track listing ==
Side one
No.	Title	Writer(s)	Length
1.	"I Like It Like That"	Chris Kenner, Allen Toussaint	1:40
2.	"Pumping"	Dave Clark, Denis Payton	1:45
3.	"I Need Love"	Dave Clark, Mike Smith	3:40
4.	"Maybe It's You"	Dave Clark, Lenny Davidson	2:16
5.	"That's How Long Our Love Will Last"	Dave Clark, Lenny Davidson	2:45
6.	"A Little Bit Of Love"	Dave Clark, Lenny Davidson	2:41

Side two
No.	Title	Writer(s)	Length
1.	"I'll Be Yours My Love"	Dave Clark, Mike Smith	2:40
2.	"Please Love Me"	Dave Clark, Denis Payton	2:05
3.	"Goodbye My Friends"	Dave Clark, Mike Smith	3:03
4.	"I Am On My Own"	Dave Clark, Lenny Davidson	2:33
5.	"She's A Loving Girl"	Dave Clark, Lenny Davidson	2:02
6.	"You Know You're Lying"	Dave Clark, Mike Smith	2:01

== Personnel ==
The Dave Clark Five

- Dave Clark – drums, backing vocals
- Mike Smith – keyboards, lead vocals
- Lenny Davidson – electric guitars, backing vocals (lead on "I Am On My Own")
- Rick Huxley – bass guitar, backing vocals
- Denis Payton – tenor saxophone, backing vocals

Additional musician

- Bobby Graham – drums (session drummer, not stated on the record sleeve)

== Charts ==
Chart (1965–1966)	Peak position
US Billboard Top LP's	32
US Cash Box Top 100 Albums	41
US Record World 100 Top LP's	22
