= The Dave Clark Five Return! =

Studio album by the Dave Clark Five
- Released: 22 May 1964
- Genres: Pop rock, beat
- Length: 23:13
- Labels: Epic; LN 24104
- Producer: Adrian Clark

The Dave Clark Five US chronology
| Glad All Over (1964) | The Dave Clark Five Return! (1964) | American Tour (1964) |

Singles from The Dave Clark Five Return!
- 1. "Can't You See That She's Mine" / "No Time to Lose" Released: 29 May 1964

The Dave Clark Five Return! is the second US studio album by the English rock band the Dave Clark Five. It features the single "Can't You See That She's Mine" and covers of "Rumble" by Link Wray & His Wray Men, "On Broadway" by The Drifters and the Disney song "Zip-a-Dee-Doo-Dah".

All of the tracks were taken from the DC5's first UK album, A Session with The Dave Clark Five. LP was released in both mono (LN 24104) and electronic stereo (BN 26104) version. The album was produced by Adrian Clark, a pseudonym combining the names of Dave Clark and engineer Adrian Kerridge.

== Reception ==
Professional ratings
Review scores
| Source | Rating |
|---|---|
| AllMusic | 2/5 stars |

In his AllMusic retrospective review of the release, Bruce Eder wrote, "Aside from the hit 'Can't You See That She's Mine,' and everything is filler, whether the covers of 'Rumble,' 'Zip-a-Dee-Doo-Dah,' and 'On Broadway,' or trite, diddling originals, including a flight into a near-Muzak instrumental ("Theme Without a Name"). Among the originals, 'I Need You, I Love You' and 'Forever and a Day' aren't too bad, but you're best off leaving this in the bin of overpriced collector items in which you'll probably find the record."

== Track listing ==
All tracks written by Dave Clark and Mike Smith, except where noted.

=== Side one ===
1. "Can't You See That She's Mine" - 2:21
2. "I Need You, I Love You" - 2:34
3. "I Love You No More" - 2:19
4. "Rumble" (Link Wray, Milt Grant) - 2:37
5. "Funny" (Dave Clark, Denis Payton) - 1:52

=== Side two ===
1. "Zip-a-Dee-Doo-Dah" (Allie Wrubel) - 2:32
2. "Can I Trust You" (Dave Clark) - 2:06
3. "Forever and a Day" - 2:10
4. "Theme Without a Name" (Dave Clark, Lenny Davidson) - 2:03
5. "On Broadway" (Barry Mann, Cynthia Weil, Jerry Leiber, Mike Stoller) - 2:39

== Personnel ==
The Dave Clark Five

- Dave Clark - drums, backing vocals
- Mike Smith - keyboards, lead vocals
- Lenny Davidson - electric guitars, backing vocals
- Rick Huxley - bass guitar, backing vocals
- Denis Payton - tenor saxophone, backing vocals
- Bobby Graham - drums (session drummer, not stated on the record sleeve)

== Charts ==
=== Weekly charts ===
| Chart (1964) | Peak position |
|---|---|
| US Billboard Top LP's | 5 |
| US Cash Box Top 50 Stereo Albums | 12 |
| US Cash Box Top 100 Monaural Albums | 7 |
| US Record World 100 Top LP's | 3 |

=== Year-end charts ===
| Chart (1964) | Peak position |
|---|---|
| US Cash Box Top 100 Albums | 59 |
