= Catch Us If You Can (film) =

1965 British film by John Boorman

- A poster bearing the film's U.S. title: Having a Wild Weekend
- Directed by: John Boorman
- Written by: Peter Nichols
- Produced by: David Deutsch; Basil Keys
- Starring: Dave Clark; Julian Holloway; Lenny Davidson; Rick Huxley; Mike Smith; Denis Payton; Barbara Ferris
- Cinematography: Manny Wynn
- Edited by: Gordon Pilkington
- Music by: The Dave Clark Five; John A. Coleman; Basil Kirchin
- Production company: Anglo-Amalgamated
- Distributed by: Warner Bros. Pictures
- Release dates: April 1965 (UK); 18 August 1965 (US); 16 May 1970 (German TV premiere)
- Running time: 91 minutes
- Country: United Kingdom
- Language: English

Catch Us If You Can (U.S. title: Having a Wild Weekend; also known as The Dave Clark Five Runs Wild) is the 1965 feature-film debut of director John Boorman. It was written by Peter Nichols. The film is a vehicle for pop band the Dave Clark Five, whose popularity at the time rivalled that of the Beatles, and it is named after their hit song "Catch Us If You Can".

== Plot ==
The five are living together in a London flat. They make breakfast then drive to Smithfield Market, passing multiple advertising posters featuring a girl and the slogan "Meat for Go".

During the filming of a TV commercial for a "Meat for Go" campaign set in London's Smithfield Market, stuntman Steve, disillusioned by the inanity of his job, absconds in an E-type Jaguar (260 EYW, one of the props) with a young actress/model, Dinah. After a visit to Oasis Swimming Pools, an open-air swimming pool in central London, and a scene in and around the Great Conservatory on the grounds of Syon House, they make their way across a wintry southern England toward Burgh Island, off the coast of Devon. Dinah is contemplating buying the island, presumably to escape the pressures of her celebrity as the "Butcher Girl" in the TV meat advertising campaign. This act of rebellion is cynically exploited by the advertising executive behind the campaign, Leon Zissell, who dispatches two of his henchmen to pursue the fleeing couple.

On their journey, Steve and Dinah first encounter a group of beatniks squatting in MOD-owned buildings on Salisbury Plain (some of this sequence was shot in the evacuated village of Imber), and then, an eccentric, upper-class, middle-aged married couple in the opulent surroundings of the Royal Crescent in Bath, Somerset. Steve also plans to visit his boyhood hero, Louie, whose youth club in London's East End he attended, and who has since relocated to Devon.

Having fled the police and Zissell's henchmen after a fancy-dress party in the Roman Baths at Bath, Steve and Dinah (with the rest of Steve's gang and the police in pursuit) make their way toward Devon. Louie recognises Dinah instantly because of her TV celebrity, but fails to recognise Steve and misremembers his name, even after being introduced. Dinah's island also proves to be disappointing; at low tide, it is reachable from the mainland, and Zissell, who is besotted with Dinah, has already arrived. A crowd arrives around the two, where Steve elects to say goodbye to Dinah and leaves with his friends.

== Cast ==
- Dave Clark Five as themselves
- Dave Clark as The Dave Clark Five: Steve
- Lenny Davidson as The Dave Clark Five: Lenny
- Rick Huxley as The Dave Clark Five: Rick
- Mike Smith as The Dave Clark Five: Mike
- Denis Payton as The Dave Clark Five: Denis
- Barbara Ferris as Dinah
- David Lodge as Louis
- Robin Bailey as Guy
- Yootha Joyce as Nan
- David De Keyser as Zissell
- Clive Swift as Duffle
- Ronald Lacey as Yeano, beatnik
- Hugh Walters as Grey
- Michael Gwynn as Hardingford, sponsor of meat ad
- Marianne Stone as Mrs Vera Stone
- Donald Morley as Barker
- Michael Blakemore as police officer
- Julian Holloway as assistant director
- Edgar Harrison as barman
- John Jones as drinker
- Peter Nichols as photographer
- Robert Lang as Whiting, columnist
- Susan Hanson as Laraine
- Andrew Tyrell as Louis's Son
- Sheila Fearn as Shirley
- Alan Lake as cameraman
- Ronald Cunliffe as clapper boy
- Anthony Gardner as director
- Peter Eyre as art director
- Zienia Merton as Allison

== Themes ==
Although they perform the off-screen soundtrack music, the Dave Clark Five (unlike the Beatles in their films) do not portray themselves but appear to be a team of freelance stuntmen/extras led by the saturnine Steve (Dave Clark). Clark had worked as a stuntman on several films, which appears to have provided him with a level of cinematic experience and camera sense rare for a pop artist of the time. The other four members of the band perform under their real first names, but have comparably minor parts.

From left: Dave Clark, Denis Payton, Mike Smith, Rick Huxley and Lenny Davidson.

The film is less of a conventional pop vehicle than one dealing with the frailty of personal relationships, the flimsiness of dreams and the difficulty of maintaining spontaneity, authenticity, and integrity in a stage-managed "society of the spectacle." Boorman's debut film drew favourable notices from Pauline Kael and Dilys Powell, as it captured much of the cultural energy of the time.

== Production notes ==
Nat Cohen had turned down the chance to make a film with The Beatles. According to John Boorman, the success of A Hard Day's Night enabled Cohen to sell Warner Bros. Pictures a film about the Dave Clark Five before it had even been made. in April 1964 Variety listed a Dave Clark Film, then called Glad all over, with Sidney Hayers attached as director, Peter Rogers as producer and Kathy Kirby as the female lead.

Cohen eventually assigned the project to producer David Deutsch, who brought in John Boorman to direct. Boorman says he was given total creative freedom as long as he kept under budget as the film was already in profit before it had been made. Boorman hired Peter Nichols to write the script (as Charles Woods was busy writing a Beatles film). Boorman says Dave Clark wanted the band to play stuntmen.

In a running gag, Lenny Davidson is the only member of the Dave Clark Five who does not utter a single word in the film, usually because the others do not let him talk. He comes dressed as Harpo Marx to the Arts Ball party (until Dinah switches costumes with him to avoid being caught by the police and her bosses; this is evident not only in the film but also on the back cover of the soundtrack album).

Marianne Faithfull rejected the role of Dinah as being "too poppy."

Boorman later he had difficulty with Clark's lack of acting ability, writing "I cut his dialogue to the bare minimum. I had to play him silent and taciturn. Often this came off as sullen. There was nothing light-hearted about him, nothing youthful, nothing graceful or rhythmical - and he a drummer. I used Barbara to get us through the scenes. This made him resentful. He thought I was favouring her at his expense. Barbara, in turn, was insecure about how she looked."

Denis Payton's last name is misspelled as "Paynton" in the opening and closing credits.

A still image of Yootha Joyce from the film was used as sleeve art on the singles "Ask" and "Some Girls Are Bigger Than Others" by the English rock band the Smiths.

Boorman developed a strong relationship with Deutsch's assistant, Alex Jacobs, during filming, even though Jacobs had a fight with Dave Clark that led to Clark missing three days of filming. Jacobs moved to the US with Boorman and wrote Point Blank for the director.

Peter Nichols wrote in his memoirs that the final script was "a pretentious odyssey about middle-aged entrepreneurs exploiting young talent, crammed with irony, philosophic overtones and three-syllable words. David [Deutsch] protested that our stars weren’t actors and couldn’t manage such dialogue, so Michael Blakemore was engaged to coach them. Only a few lines of mine survived to the finished film."

== Release ==
At an appearance in Paterson, New Jersey, during the Dave Clark Five's promotional tour for the film, the band's business manager and a bodyguard were arrested after assaulting a police officer; the scuffle began when police told the band's fifteen uniformed guards to stop hitting teenage fans who had been rushing the stage. At an appearance at the Branford Theater in Newark, New Jersey, more than 1,100 fans created bedlam by stamping on the floor, standing on their seats and screaming. A similar reaction occurred when the band visited a cinema in Queens, New York to promote the film, with more than 5,000 fans breaking through barricades to reach the band members, causing policemen at the scene to call for reinforcements.

== Soundtrack ==
Of the 12 tracks on the U.S. soundtrack album (Epic 24162/26162), only four are from the film: "Having a Wild Weekend", "Catch Us If You Can", "Sweet Memories" and "On the Move". The remainder of the songs used in the film were from previous albums, including "Time" (from Glad All Over), "Move On" and "Ol' Sol" (from American Tour), and "When" and "I Can't Stand It" (from Coast to Coast).

== Reception ==
According to film historian Alexander Walker, the movie "did poor business but it launched Boorman." Boorman felt the film "had a hollow centre" and that "the young audience were perplexed by its pessimsm". However he said the film "was greeted with kindness by the critics" in Britain and the US - especially Pauline Kael, whose positive review "gave it and me a degree of credibility in Hollywood."

Filmink argued "as a standard teen rock musical, it failed to fulfil expectations and was a box office disappointment. However, it was also a brilliantly made, fascinating, innovative, and even haunting movie, and a critical darling."

The Monthly Film Bulletin wrote:

Two things make this an intriguingly unusual teenage musical: it is consistently worth looking at, and it finds intelligent expression for a genuinely youthful point of view. In fact, though distantly inspired by the familiar formula, it doesn't deserve to be described as a teenage musical at all. The musical numbers (played off screen by the Dave Clark Five) are used simply as an aural background or as a starting point for a series of distinctly imaginative visual passages: fast cutting around the poster of the meat girl; long low-angled tracking shots through London; snowscapes and seascapes and Bath's Royal Crescent artistically photographed by Manny Wynn; a Felliniesque party that ends up with the leading characters, dressed as their favourite film personalities, involved in a frantic chase along the edge of a Roman bath. ... The performances of the young people are for the most part negligible, although Barbara Ferris makes an appealing Butcher Girl. Remarkably, in view of the fact that John Boorman, who has worked for television, is only thirty-one and is making his first film, this is a director's picture from start to finish. Boorman's obvious feeling for the medium is rich in promise.

New York Times reviewer Bosley Crowther praised the film as an "obvious but strangely haunting romance" and a "fresh and fetching British film" in a contemporaneous review.

Writing in the Ottawa Citizen, reviewer Gordon Stoneham wrote: "Having a Wild Weekend is a rather odd vehicle to spotlight a group of teen-age idols, but, on the other hand, it shows them in a new and quite pleasant light."

Pauline Kael wrote about the film that:

Its tone is uneven, its style is faltering and somewhat confused, but it's trying to get at something. It's trying to be a success and to question the meaning of success-and inevitably fails on both counts... The movie seems to discover tentatively, with regret and bewilderment, that the cures are illusory, are only more symptoms. It's as if Pop art had discovered Chekhov-the Three Sisters finally set off for Moscow and along the way discover that there isn't any Moscow... This movie has an aftertaste. It's bittersweet-which is an old-fashioned word with connotations of sadness, of nostalgia, and perhaps of something one might call truth. It is one of those films that linger in the memory.
