= Good Love Is Hard to Find =

Good Love Is Hard to Find has been used as the title of the following songs:

- A song by the Dave Clark Five released on their self-titled compilation album
- A song by Ronnie Spector from the album Unfinished Business
- A song by Sara Evans from the album Slow Me Down
