= Coast to Coast (Dave Clark Five album) =

Studio album by the Dave Clark Five
- Released: 21 December 1964
- Genres: Pop rock, beat
- Length: 20:36
- Label: Epic – LN 24128/ BN 26128
- Producers: Adrian Clark (pseudonym for Dave Clark and Adrian Kerridge)

The Dave Clark Five US chronology
American Tour (1964)	Coast to Coast (1964)	Weekend in London (1965)

Singles from Coast to Coast
- 1. "Everybody Knows (I Still Love You)" / "Ol' Sol" Released: 18 September 1964; 2. "Any Way You Want It" / "Crying Over You" Released: 6 November 1964

Coast to Coast is the fourth US studio album by the English rock band the Dave Clark Five. It is notable for containing two hit singles "Any Way You Want It" and "Everybody Knows (I Still Love You)". Other songs from this album were used in the Dave Clark Five film Having a Wild Weekend such as "I Can't Stand It" and "When". In Canada, it was released as Across Canada with the Dave Clark Five on Capitol Records.

== Reception ==
Professional ratings
Review scores
Source	Rating
AllMusic	4/5 stars

In his retrospective review for Allmusic, critic Bruce Eder wrote, "Coast To Coast opens strong and it gets better, blooming into an amazingly diverse yet consistently powerful record made up entirely of group originals... Had there been an actual rock press in 1964, or if the Dave Clark Five been taken more seriously sooner, Coast To Coast would probably be regarded today as something close to an essential British Invasion record..."

Cash Box said of the single "Everybody Knows (I Still Love You)" that it has "an interesting cool quality and a good dance rhythm" and it "can't miss."

== Track listing ==
=== Side one ===
1. "Any Way You Want It" (Ron Ryan) – 2:26
2. "Give Me Love" (Also titled as "I Can't Stop Loving You") (Dave Clark, Denny Payton) – 1:55
3. "I Can't Stand It" (Dave Clark, Lenny Davidson) – 1:31
4. "I'm Left Without You" (Also titled as "What Is There To Say") (Dave Clark, Denny Payton) – 1:45
5. "Everybody Knows (I Still Love You)" (Dave Clark, Lenny Davidson) – 1:39
6. "Crying Over You" (Dave Clark, Lenny Davidson) – 2:04

=== Side two ===
1. "Say You Want Me" (Dave Clark, Lenny Davidson) – 1:42
2. "When" (Dave Clark, Lenny Davidson) – 2:23
3. "Don't You Know" (Dave Clark, Denny Payton) – 1:33
4. "To Me" (Dave Clark, Denny Payton) – 1:39
5. "It's Not True" (Dave Clark, Mike Smith) – 1:59

== Personnel ==
=== Dave Clark Five ===
- Dave Clark - drums, backing vocals
- Mike Smith - keyboards, lead vocals
- Lenny Davidson - guitars, backing and harmony vocals
- Rick Huxley - bass guitar, backing vocals
- Denis Payton - saxophone, backing vocals

== Charts ==
=== Weekly charts ===
Chart (1964–1965)	Peak position
US Billboard Top LP's	6
US Cash Box Top 50 Stereo Albums	49
US Cash Box Top 100 Monaural Albums	10
US Record World 100 Top LP's	7

=== Year-end charts ===
Chart (1965)	Peak position
US Billboard Top LP's	85
US Cash Box Top 100 Albums	69
