= Weekend in London =

Studio album by the Dave Clark Five
- Released: 1 March 1965
- Genres: Pop rock; beat
- Length: 23:48
- Label: Epic - LN 24139/ BN 26139
- Producer: Dave Clark

The Dave Clark Five US chronology
Coast to Coast (1965)	Weekend in London (1965)	Having a Wild Weekend (1965)

Singles from Coast to Coast
- 1. "Come Home" / "Your Turn To Cry" Released: 22 January 1965; 2. "Reelin' and Rockin'" / "I'm Thinking" Released: 2 April 1965

Weekend in London is the fifth studio album by the English rock band the Dave Clark Five. It contains the single "Come Home" and covers of "Blue Suede Shoes" by Carl Perkins and "Little Bitty Pretty One" by Thurston Harris. The album also features "Hurting Inside" and "'Till the Right One Comes Along", both of which later appeared on a The Dave Clark Five (1971) compilation album. In Canada, it was released as Encores on Capitol Records.

== Reception ==
Professional ratings
Review scores
Source	Rating
AllMusic	2.5/5 stars

In his retrospective review for AllMusic, Greg Adams said the band's own songs on Weekend in London "vacillate between the pretty Beatlesque pop of 'Your Turn to Cry' and moody rockers similar to early Zombies" and that as the band released three albums around that time, "Weekend in London sounds like they were being stretched a little too thin."

== Track listing ==
All tracks written by Dave Clark and Mike Smith, except were noted.

=== Side one ===
1. "Come Home" – 2:49
2. "We'll Be Running" (Dave Clark, Denis Payton) – 1:32
3. "Blue Suede Shoes" (Carl Perkins) – 1:44
4. "Hurting Inside" – 2:37
5. "I'll Never Know" (Dave Clark, Denis Payton) – 1:45
6. "'Til the Right One Comes Along" – 2:11

=== Side two ===
1. "I'm Thinking" (Dave Clark, Denis Payton) – 1:29
2. "Your Turn to Cry" – 3:12
3. "Little Bitty Pretty One" (Robert James Byrd) – 1:30
4. "Remember it's Me" – 2:19
5. "Mighty Good Loving" (Dave Clark, Lenny Davidson) – 2:40

== Personnel ==
The Dave Clark Five

- Dave Clark - drums, backing vocals
- Mike Smith - keyboards, lead vocals
- Lenny Davidson - guitars, backing vocals and harmony vocals
- Rick Huxley - bass guitar, backing vocals
- Denis Payton - saxophone, harmonica, backing vocals

Technical

- Jay Thompson - cover photography

== Charts ==
Chart (1965)	Peak position
US Billboard Top LP's	24
US Cash Box Top 100 Albums	24
US Record World 100 Top LP's	13
