= American Tour =

Studio album by the Dave Clark Five
- Released: 20 July 1964
- Genres: Pop rock, beat
- Length: 27:43
- Label: Epic
- Producers: Adrian Clark (pseudonym for Adrian Kerridge and Dave Clark)

The Dave Clark Five US chronology
The Dave Clark Five Return! (1964)	American Tour (1964)	Coast to Coast (1964)

Singles from American Tour
- 1. "Because" / "Theme Without A Name" Released: 13 July 1964

American Tour is the third U.S. studio album by the English rock band the Dave Clark Five, released in 1964 by Epic Records. Contrary to its title, inspired by the band's first US tour, American Tour is not a live album.

American Tour contains the hit song "Because", as well as "Whenever You're Around", which was not a single in the U.S. but was issued as a B-side to "Thinking of You Baby" in the U.K., and was used in the film Get Yourself a College Girl (1964). In Canada, the album was released by Capitol Records as On Stage with The Dave Clark Five. The album reached No. 11 on the Billboard 200 album chart and No. 16 in Cashbox. The album has not been released in the UK.

In his AllMusic retrospective review of the release, Greg Adams wrote, "The mixture of jazzy chords, straight-ahead rock, and saxophone (which was pretty passé in 1964) is an interesting one, making the group less enigmatic than the Zombies and more obviously rooted in earlier rock traditions than the Beatles."

== Track listing ==
Side one

1. "Because" (Dave Clark) – 2:23
2. "Who Does He Think He Is" (Clark, Mike Smith) – 1:55
3. "Move On" (Clark, Denny Payton) – 2:12
4. "Whenever You're Around" (Clark, Smith) – 2:43
5. "I Want You Still" (Clark, Payton) – 1:34
6. "Long Ago" (Clark, Lenny Davidson) – 2:11

Side two

1. "Come On Over" (Clark, Davidson) – 2:18
2. "Blue Monday" (Clark, Smith) – 2:59
3. "Sometimes" (Clark, Ron Ryan) – 2:50
4. "Any Time You Want Love" (Clark, Davidson) – 2:11
5. "I Cried Over You" (Clark, Davidson) – 2:27
6. "Ol' Sol" (Clark, Payton) – 2:00

== Personnel ==
The Dave Clark Five

- Dave Clark
- Mike Smith
- Denis Payton
- Lenny Davidson
- Rick Huxley

Technical

- Adrian Kerridge – co-producer
- Dave Clark – co-producer
- John Mahan – liner notes

== Charts ==
Chart (1964–1965)	Peak position
US Billboard Top LP's	11
US Cash Box Top 50 Stereo Albums	32
US Cash Box Top 100 Monaural Albums	16
US Record World 100 Top LP's	10
