= Can't You See That She's Mine =

Single by the Dave Clark Five

from the album A Session with The Dave Clark Five
- B-side: "Because" (UK) "No Time To Lose" (US)
- Released: 22 May 1964 (UK); 29 May 1964 (US)
- Studio: Lansdowne, London
- Genre: Beat
- Length: 2:21
- Label: Columbia
- Songwriters: Dave Clark; Mike Smith
- Producer: Adrian Clark

The Dave Clark Five UK singles chronology
"Bits and Pieces" (1964)	"Can't You See That She's Mine" (1964)	"Thinking of You Baby" (1964)

The Dave Clark Five US singles chronology
"Do You Love Me" (1964)	"Can't You See That She's Mine" (1964)	"Because" (1964)

Audio
- "Can't You See That She's Mine" on YouTube

"Can't You See That She's Mine" is the fourth single released in the United States by the Dave Clark Five. The song was written by Dave Clark and Mike Smith, and was the Dave Clark Five's fourth Gold Record. The B-side "No Time To Lose" was taken from the previous Dave Clark Five album Glad All Over.

== Background ==
The middle four bars start with the lyric "People talk and try to break us up. Well we know they don't understand", which is a direct lift from the 1960 Ray Charles song "Sticks And Stones".

Cash Box described it as a "sizzling rocker...that should move up the charts in jet -speed fashion.."

== Chart performance ==
"Can't You See That She's Mine" reached No.4 on the Billboard Hot 100 chart for the week of 18 July 1964. In the UK, the single rose to No.10 in June 1964. In Canada, the song reached No.5 on the CHUM Charts and No.3 on the RPM charts.
