= Everybody Knows (Dave Clark Five song) =

Single by Dave Clark 5

from the album Everybody Knows
- B-side: "Concentration Baby" (UK); "Inside and Out" (U.S.)
- Released: December 1967
- Recorded: 1967
- Genre: Pop
- Length: 2:10
- Label: Epic
- Songwriters: Les Reed, Barry Mason
- Producer: Dave Clark

Dave Clark 5 singles chronology
| "A Little Bit Now" (1967) | "Everybody Knows" (1967) | "Please Stay" (1968) |

"Everybody Knows" is a 1967 song by the Dave Clark Five, also known as "Everybody Knows (You Said Goodbye)", to avoid confusion with their 1964 song, "Everybody Knows (I Still Love You)". The song features lead vocals by Lenny Davidson, unusual among their songs.

The song was a major hit in their native UK, where it reached number two. It was also a Top 10 hit in Ireland and New Zealand, peaking in both nations at number six. "Everybody Knows" narrowly missed the Top 40 in the U.S., where it reached #43 on the Billboard Hot 100, becoming their final entry of two dozen hits.

Cash Box said it has a "haunting melody and splendid vocal strength."

== Chart history ==
=== Weekly charts ===
| Chart (1967–68) | Peak position |
|---|---|
| Australia (Go-Set) | 42 |
| Denmark (Danmarks Radio) | 12 |
| Ireland (IRMA) | 6 |
| New Zealand (Listener) | 6 |
| UK Singles Chart (OCC) | 2 |
| US Billboard Hot 100 | 43 |
| US Cash Box Top 100 | 41 |

=== Year-end charts ===
| Chart (1967) | Rank |
|---|---|
| UK | 32 |

== Cover versions ==
"Everybody Knows" was covered by Engelbert Humperdinck in 1967. It was entitled "Everybody Knows (We're Through)." The song was included on his Last Waltz LP, and is sung with a same-sex perspective. His version reached #11 in South Africa. It was also covered by Dan Mendova in 1998.
