= I Like It Like That (Chris Kenner song) =

1961 song by Chris Kenner, covered by the Dave Clark Five

Single by The Dave Clark Five

from the album I Like It Like That
- B-side: "Hurting Inside"
- Released: 1965 (Chris Kenner version released in June 1961)
- Genre: Pop rock
- Length: 1:40
- Label: Epic 9811
- Songwriters: Chris Kenner, Allen Toussaint
- Producers: Adrian Clark (pseudonym of Dave Clark and Adrian Kerridge)

The Dave Clark Five singles chronology
"Reelin' and Rockin'" (1965)	"I Like It Like That" (1965)	"Catch Us If You Can" (1965)

"I Like It Like That" is a song written by Chris Kenner and Allen Toussaint, and first recorded by Kenner, whose version reached No. 2 on the Billboard Hot 100 chart in 1961. It was kept from the No. 1 spot by Bobby Lewis' "Tossin' and Turnin'". This release also went to No. 2 on the R&B singles chart, also behind "Tossin' and Turnin'". The narrator of the song invites the listener to come with him to a happening spot named "I Like It Like That". The lyrics are mostly spoken in the verses, as well as saying the line: "The name of the place is".

== Cover versions ==
- In the Dave Clark Five's 1965 version, all the lyrics are sung. It charted at No. 7 on the Billboard Hot 100. Cash Box said that the Dave Clark Five play "the pulsating teen-angled terpsichorean-themed affair in a contagious warm-hearted bluesy style". Record World called it a "very tough rendition."
