= Because (Dave Clark Five song) =

1964 single by The Dave Clark Five

Single by The Dave Clark Five

from the album American Tour
- A-side: "Can't You See That She's Mine" (UK)
- B-side: "Theme Without A Name" (US)
- Released: August 1964
- Recorded: 1964
- Genre: Pop rock
- Length: 2:23
- Label: Columbia (UK); Capitol (Canada); Epic (US)
- Songwriter: Ron Ryan
- Producer: Adrian Clark

The Dave Clark Five singles chronology
"Can't You See That She's Mine" (1964)	"Because" (1964)	"Everybody Knows (I Still Love You)" (1964)

"Because" is a song recorded by English rock band The Dave Clark Five from their third studio album American Tour (1964). The song was produced by Adrian Clark (a pseudonym for Dave Clark and Adrian Kerridge), and was originally the B-side to "Can't You See That She's Mine" in the UK.

"Because" was released as a single in the United States and reached number three on the US Billboard Hot 100 chart. It also charted at number three in both Canada and New Zealand. Julian Lennon released a version of the song which peaked at number 40 on the UK Singles Chart in 1985.

== Background and release ==
"Because" was written with the intention of being the Dave Clark Five's fifth US single, but the band's label, Epic Records, was initially resistant, believing the ballad strayed too far from the hit-making formula that had proven successful with the band's previous upbeat singles. In May 1964, the song was released in the UK as the B-side to "Can't You See That She's Mine". Clark insisted that "Because" be released as an A-side in the US, and Epic eventually agreed. The single entered the Billboard Hot 100 chart at number 60 in August and peaked six weeks later at number three. "Because" became the band's fifth US single to sell more than one million copies. In Canada, the song reached number three on RPM magazine's singles chart.

== Critical reception ==
- In a review for the single, Billboard described "Because" as a "warmly romantic ballad ... that should keep [the Dave Clark Five] on the chart."
- Cash Box described it as "a most attractive shuffle rock-a-cha-cha beat newcomer ... that the artists wax in ear-arresting manner."
- Richie Unterberger of AllMusic said the song "was on about the same melodic level as all but the best of the early Beatles' compositions". He felt the song showed a more subtle side of the band, contrasting it with the "stomping hits that were their main diet." Unterberger also complimented the track's harmony vocals, and noted the "beautiful, unusual, and irresistible chord changes" as well as the "tender, romantic lyrics".

== Other versions ==
- The Supremes recorded a version of "Because" on the group's A Bit of Liverpool (1964), a tribute album dedicated to music of the British Invasion.
- Julian Lennon recorded the song for the soundtrack to Dave Clark's musical Time (1986). Released as a single in 1985, Lennon's version reached number 40 on the UK Singles Chart, and number eight on the Belgium Singles Chart.
- Independent recording artist and producer Michael Poss recorded a cover of "Because" for his debut studio album, I Can Feel You In My Heart (1996), released under his independent label, Twilight Souls Music.

== Track listing ==
7" Single (US, Canada)

No.	Title	Writer(s)	Length
1.	"Because"	Ron Ryan	2:23
2.	"Theme Without a Name"	Davidson	2:05

== Chart performance ==
=== Weekly charts ===
Chart (1964)	Peak position
Canadian Singles Chart	3
New Zealand (Lever)	3
US Billboard Hot 100	3
US Cash Box Top 100	7

=== Year-end charts ===
Chart (1964)	Rank
US Billboard Hot 100	64
