= Here Comes Summer =

Single by Jerry Keller
- B-side: "Time Has a Way"
- Released: May 1959
- Recorded: 1958
- Genre: Pop
- Length: 2:05
- Label: Kapp (U.S.); London (UK)
- Songwriter: Jerry Keller

"Here Comes Summer" is an American popular song which was written and performed by Jerry Keller. The song was released on Kapp Records in the United States and London Records in the United Kingdom.

== Background ==
A popular misconception is that this song quotes the line "the sun shines bright" from the Stephen Foster song "My Old Kentucky Home", but this is untrue as the line contained in "Here Comes Summer" is "oh, let the sun shine bright".

== Chart performance ==
In 1959, it spent 13 weeks on the Billboard Hot 100, reaching No. 14, while spending one week at No. 1 on the UK's New Musical Express chart, and reaching No. 8 on Norway's VG-lista, and No. 4 on Canada's CHUM Hit Parade. It was Keller's only hit either side of the Atlantic.

== Cover versions ==
It was also recorded by:

- Cliff Richard and The Shadows (whose version was not released as a single)
- The Dave Clark Five in 1970, with different lyrics, but was not as commercially successful; the Dave Clark Five version peaked at number 44 in the UK.
- The pop band Child released the song as a single in 1979, again with different lyrics from Keller's original, but it also failed to enter the UK Chart.
- A recording of the song (produced by Scott Shannon) was also released by the band Wildfire in 1977 and reached number 49 on the Billboard Hot 100.
