= Bits and Pieces (song) =

Single by The Dave Clark Five

from the album Glad All Over
- B-side: "All of the Time"
- Released: 14 February 1964 (UK); 20 March 1964 (US)
- Recorded: 1963
- Genre: Pop rock, beat
- Length: 1:59
- Label: Columbia DB 7210; Epic 5-9671; Capitol 72148 (Canada)
- Songwriters: Credited: Dave Clark, Mike Smith; Claimed: Ron Ryan
- Producers: Adrian Clark (pseudonym for Dave Clark and Adrian Kerridge)

The Dave Clark Five UK singles chronology
"Glad All Over" (1963)	"Bits and Pieces" (1964)	"Can't You See That She's Mine" (1964)

The Dave Clark Five US singles chronology
"Glad All Over" (1964)	"Bits and Pieces" (1964)	"Do You Love Me" (1964)

Audio
- "Bits and Pieces" on YouTube

"Bits and Pieces" is a song by British beat group The Dave Clark Five. The single hit number 2 in the UK and number 4 in the US, as well as being a success in other countries. It was number 2 or 4 in Australia, number 1 in Canada and Ireland, and number 4 in the Netherlands. In Germany, it reached number 20.

Lead vocals are sung by Mike Smith, who also co-wrote the song.

The song is in antiphonal style, with Mike Smith singing a solo line and the whole group responding. The drums have a very prominent part in the accompaniment. Additionally, some of the song's unique percussion was supplied by builder's scaffold boards, which two of the band members (reportedly quite intoxicated) stamped on, not always perfectly in time to the music.

Robert Christgau, writing in 1969, called the song "a wonderfully serviceable rock throwaway, raucous and meaningless, perfect for shouting into the night." Cash Box described it as "a hard-hitting rocker that the boys pound out in a steady, heavy beat style."

The song's distinct stomp-like pattern has been sampled by numerous musicians.

The Dave Clark Five performed "Bits and Pieces" in an appearance on the Ed Sullivan Show.
