= Glad All Over (Dave Clark Five album) =

Studio album by the Dave Clark Five
- Released: 17 March 1964
- Genres: Pop rock, beat
- Length: 24:00
- Label: Epic
- Producer: Dave Clark

The Dave Clark Five US chronology
Glad All Over (1964)	The Dave Clark Five Return! (1964)

Singles from Glad All Over
- 1. "Glad All Over" / "I Know You" Released: 3 January 1964; 2. "Bits and Pieces" / "All of the Time" Released: 20 March 1964; 3. "Do You Love Me" / "Chaquita" Released: 17 April 1964

Glad All Over is the American debut studio album of the English rock band the Dave Clark Five. Epic Records released the album on 17 March 1964 in the United States to capitalize on the success of the album's title track, and despite the caption saying "Featuring Bits and Pieces", the single did not become a hit until two months later. The album contains some of their hit songs like "Glad All Over", "Bits and Pieces" and "Do You Love Me". In Canada, it was released as Bits and Pieces on Capitol Records.

== Reception ==
Professional ratings
Review scores
Source	Rating
Allmusic	3.5/5 stars

In his AllMusic retrospective review of the release, Richie Unterberger wrote, "The Dave Clark Five's first album might seem a bit on the meager side outside of the context of the first flush of the British Invasion. At the time, though, it was a pretty exuberant slab o' vinyl that rocked pretty hard for the most part, paced by the three Top 10 singles 'Glad All Over,' 'Do You Love Me,' and 'Bits and Pieces.' And it does have a few decent, though not great, original songs that don't show up on greatest hits compilations: the solid pop/rocker 'I Know You,' the raucous 'Twist and Shout' rip-off 'No Time to Lose,' and the surprisingly savage instrumental 'Chaquita,' an inversion of 'Tequila' with its snaky, growling guitar riffs and dirty sax. There's also some pure filler, like the jazzy instrumental 'Time' and the infantile 'Doo Dah.' It certainly ranks among their best non-greatest-hits albums, which isn't as high a recommendation as it sounds, since the group's LPs weren't that good overall."

== Track listing ==
All tracks are written by Dave Clark and Mike Smith, and except where noted.

Side one
No.	Title	Writer(s)	Length
1.	"Glad All Over"		2:43
2.	"All of the Time"		2:14
3.	"Stay"	Maurice Williams	2:06
4.	"Chaquita"		2:12
5.	"Do You Love Me"	Berry Gordy Jr.	2:20

Side two
No.	Title	Writer(s)	Length
6.	"Bits and Pieces"		1:56
7.	"I Know You"	Clark, Lenny Davidson	1:58
8.	"No Time to Lose"		2:02
9.	"Doo Dah"	Clark	2:21
10.	"Time"	Clark, Davidson	2:17
11.	"She's All Mine"	Clark	2:11

== Personnel ==
The Dave Clark Five

- Dave Clark – drums, backing vocals
- Mike Smith – organ, piano, lead vocals
- Lenny Davidson – guitars, backing vocals
- Rick Huxley – bass guitar, harmonica, backing vocals
- Denis Payton – saxophone, backing vocals
- Bobby Graham - drums

== Charts ==
=== Weekly charts ===
Chart (1964)	Peak position
Canada CHUM's Album Index	1
US Billboard Top LP's	3
US Cash Box Top 50 Stereo Albums	20
US Cash Box Top 100 Monaural Albums	6
US Record World 100 Top LP's	5

=== Year-end charts ===
Chart (1964)	Peak position
US Cash Box Top 100 Albums	27

== Certification ==
Region	Certification	Certified units/sales
United States (RIAA)	Gold	500,000^{^}
^{^} Shipments figures based on certification alone.
