= The Dave Clark Five =

English rock band

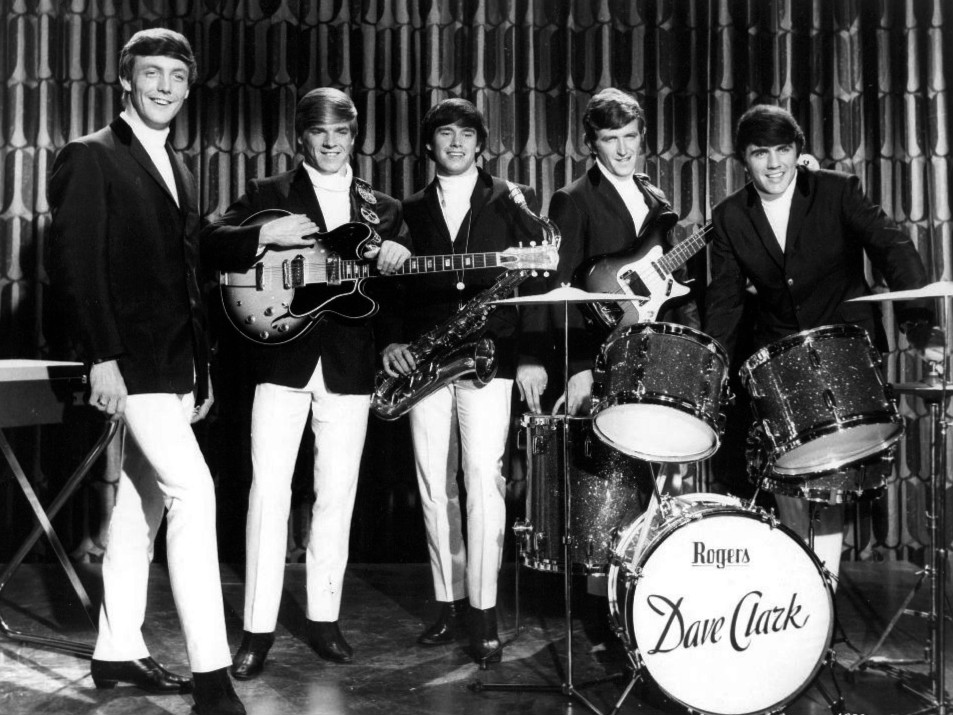
- The Dave Clark Five in 1964. L–R: Mike Smith, Lenny Davidson, Denis Payton, Rick Huxley, Dave Clark.

Background information
- Origin: Tottenham, London, England
- Genres: Rock and roll; beat; pop
- Works: Discography
- Years active: 1958–1970 (Dave Clark Five); 1970–1973 (Dave Clark & Friends spinoff)
- Labels: Columbia (EMI); Epic; Capitol
- Past members: Dave Clark; Mike Smith; Lenny Davidson; Rick Huxley; Denis Payton

The Dave Clark Five, also known as the DC5, were an English rock and roll band formed in 1958 in Tottenham, London. Drummer Dave Clark was the group's leader, producer and co-songwriter. In January 1964, they had their first UK top-ten single, "Glad All Over", which knocked the Beatles' "I Want to Hold Your Hand" off the top of the UK Singles Chart. It peaked at No. 6 in the United States in April 1964. Although this was their only UK No. 1, they topped the US chart in December 1965, with their cover of Bobby Day's "Over and Over". Their other UK top-ten hits include "Bits and Pieces", "Can't You See That She's Mine", "Catch Us If You Can", "Everybody Knows", "The Red Balloon", "Good Old Rock 'n' Roll", and a version of Chet Powers' "Get Together" (retitled as "Everybody Get Together").

They were the second group of the British Invasion to appear on The Ed Sullivan Show in the United States (for two weeks in March 1964 following the Beatles' three weeks the previous month). They would ultimately have 18 appearances on the show. The DC5 were one of the most commercially successful acts of the British Invasion, releasing seventeen top-40 hits in the US between 1964 and 1967, including several that did not chart as highly in the UK such as "Because", "Do You Love Me", "Everybody Knows (I Still Love You)", "Any Way You Want It", "I Like It Like That", "Try Too Hard" and "You Got What It Takes". In 1965, the group starred in a feature film vehicle, Catch Us If You Can, directed by John Boorman. The group disbanded in early 1970, though Clark and a few former members continued as Dave Clark & Friends until 1973. In 2008, the band was inducted into the Rock and Roll Hall of Fame.

== History ==
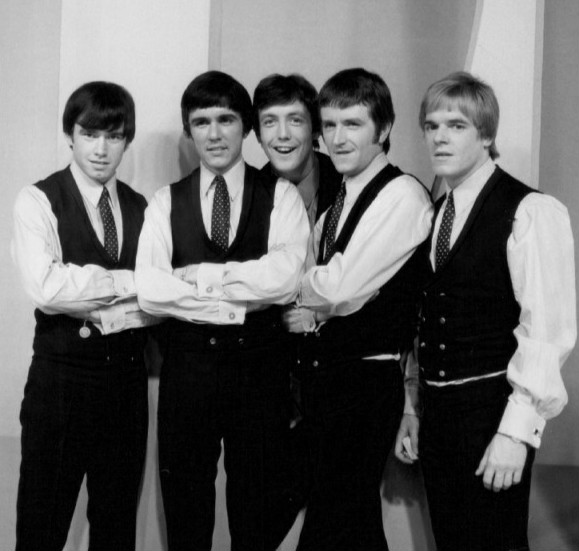
The Ed Sullivan Show in 1966. From left: Denis Payton, Dave Clark, Mike Smith, Rick Huxley and Lenny Davidson.

The band had its origins in 1958, as the backing musicians for north London vocalist Stan Saxon. Dave Clark played drums and contributed background vocals, alongside a frequently changing line-up. Clark and guitarist Rick Huxley both participated in the 1958 line-up. Clark and his bandmates eventually split with Saxon and reconstituted themselves as a standalone concern in January 1962, making their home in the South Grove Youth Club in Tottenham, London. After a little more evolution, a lasting ensemble was settled, with Clark on drums, Huxley moving to bass, Lenny Davidson on lead guitar, Denis Payton on saxophone (and harmonica and rhythm guitar), and Mike Smith on keyboards and lead vocals. Davidson's previous bands were the Off Beats and the Impalas.

The DC5 were promoted as the vanguard of a "Tottenham Sound", a response to Liverpool's Mersey Beat sound, which featured an often loud and forceful production style driven by Clark's punchy drumming, Payton's saxophone padding and Smith's belting vocals. Dave Clark produced their recordings in collaboration with sound engineer Adrian Kerridge of Lansdowne Studios, with production credited using the pseudonym Adrian Clark. Session drummer Bobby Graham has claimed to have played on some of the band's hits to allow Clark to be free to produce.

Dave Clark was also the group's manager, and struck business deals that allowed him to produce the band's recordings and gave him control of the master recordings. Songwriting credits for the band's original material went to Clark, or more often to the team of Clark and Smith. Clark/Davidson and Clark/Payton compositions were also not uncommon.

The Dave Clark Five had 12 Top 40 hits in the UK between 1964 and 1967, and 17 records in the Top 40 of the US Billboard chart. Their cover of Bobby Day's "Over and Over" went to No. 1 in the US on the Billboard Hot 100 on Christmas Day 1965, despite less impressive sales in the UK (it peaked at No. 45 on the UK Singles Chart). They made 18 appearances on The Ed Sullivan Show – more than any other British Invasion group. They were featured in a film released in 1964 entitled, Get Yourself a College Girl.

The band released a film, Catch Us If You Can (directed by John Boorman), in 1965. It starred Barbara Ferris, and was released in the United States as Having a Wild Weekend. The short film Hits in Action highlighted a series of Dave Clark Five hits.

Other than the songs "Live in the Sky", "Maze of Love", "Inside and Out", "The Red Balloon" and "Lost in His Dreams", the band did not follow the psychedelic music trend. Their popularity in the US mostly dried up by 1967, though they continued to score hits in Britain for another three years. The Dave Clark Five disbanded in 1970, having had three singles on the UK chart that year, two of which reached the Top Ten. In 1970, Davidson, Huxley and Payton left, and Alan Parker and Eric Ford joined on lead guitar and bass. That line-up, renamed "Dave Clark & Friends", lasted until 1972.

== Post break-up ==
Following the group's break-up, Clark set up a cable company. In the process, he acquired the rights to the 1960s pop series Ready Steady Go!. Additionally, he wrote and produced the 1986 London stage musical Time – The Musical where he directed the last performance of Sir Laurence Olivier. A two-disc vinyl album was released in conjunction with the stage production featuring music recorded by Julian Lennon (singing DC5's song "Because"), Freddie Mercury, Stevie Wonder, Cliff Richard, Ashford & Simpson and Olivier's selected dialogue. This double album was digitally remastered and released on iTunes in May 2012.

Mike Smith teamed up with Mike d'Abo (previously with Manfred Mann) for one album in 1976. He also released a now-scarce CD in 2000 titled It's Only Rock & Roll and returned to performing in 2003 after a hiatus of 25 years. He formed Mike Smith's Rock Engine and did two mini-tours of the US He died on 28 February 2008 in a Buckinghamshire hospital from pneumonia, a complication of a paralysing spinal injury sustained from a fall in 2003.

Denis Payton died on 17 December 2006 at the age of 63 after a long battle with cancer. Rick Huxley died from emphysema on 11 February 2013 at the age of 72. Lenny Davidson taught guitar for many years at a school in Cambridgeshire, the county he lives in.

Between 1978 and 1993, none of their music was available to be purchased in any commercial format due to rights-holder Clark declining to license the band's recordings. In 1993, a single CD Glad All Over Again was produced by Dave himself and released by EMI in Britain. After a 1989 deal with the Disney Channel to rebroadcast the 1960s ITV show Ready Steady Go! (which Clark owned), he made a deal with Disney-owned Hollywood Records to issue in 1993 a double CD History of the Dave Clark Five. No DC5 material was then legally available until 2008, when the 28-track The Hits compilation was released by Universal Music in the UK. In 2009, selections from the band's catalogue were released on iTunes.

In 2014, Dave Clark wrote, produced, appeared in, and partly presented the television documentary The Dave Clark Five and Beyond: Glad All Over. Smith also appeared via archival footage and archived interviews, but there was no participation from Lenny Davidson nor were there any archived interviews from Denis Payton or Rick Huxley. The documentary also featured appearances from Paul McCartney, Whoopi Goldberg, Elton John, and Gene Simmons of Kiss.

In 2019, almost the entire catalogue from the band, including all the original 1960s studio albums, became available on Spotify for the first time. On 24 January 2020, BMG Rights Management, with whom Clark has recently joined forces to reissue the band's recordings, released a new DC5 greatest hits CD (titled All the Hits, and which was based on the 2008 The Hits compilation) in two configurations.

== Induction into Rock and Roll Hall of Fame ==
The Dave Clark Five made the list of nominees for the class of 2008, and on 13 December 2007 it was announced that the band would be inducted into the Rock and Roll Hall of Fame on 10 March 2008. The group was inducted by Tom Hanks, who wrote, directed and starred in the 1996 film That Thing You Do!, which was about an American one-hit wonder band that became popular in the wake of the British Invasion.

In attendance with the three surviving members of the DC5 were the families of Lenny Davidson and Rick Huxley, and Denis Payton's two sons. Mike Smith had planned on attending but died 11 days before the induction. Dave Clark opened up his acceptance speech by saying that he felt like he was at the Oscars. Davidson mentioned that they arrived in New York City for the ceremony on 8 March, exactly 44 years after the group's first appearance on The Ed Sullivan Show.

Joan Jett honoured the Dave Clark Five by performing "Bits and Pieces" with John Mellencamp's band. To perform "Glad All Over", Jett was joined by John Fogerty, John Mellencamp, Billy Joel and other artists who performed throughout the evening.

== Members ==
The Dave Clark Five comprised:

=== Classic line-up ===
- Dave Clark – backing and occasional lead vocals, drums (1959–1970; 1970–1972, Dave Clark and Friends spinoff group)
- Mike Smith – lead vocals, keyboards (1961–1970; 1970–1973, Dave Clark and Friends spinoff group; died 2008)
- Lenny Davidson – backing and lead vocals, lead and rhythm guitars (1961–1970)
- Rick Huxley (ex the Riverside Blues Boys, the Spon Valley Stompers) – backing vocals, bass guitar, rhythm guitar (1959–1970; died 2013)
- Denis Payton (ex the Renegades, the Les Heath Combo, the Blue Dukes, the Mike Jones Combo) – backing and occasional lead vocals, tenor and baritone saxophones, harmonica, rhythm guitar (1962–1970; died 2006)

=== Early members ===
- Stan Saxon – lead vocals, saxophone
- Mick Ryan – lead guitar
- Chris Walls – bass

=== Dave Clark & Friends members ===
- Alan Parker – lead guitar
- Eric Ford – bass

== Discography ==
=== Studio albums ===
- Glad All Over (US, 1964)
- The Dave Clark Five Return! (US, 1964)/A Session with The Dave Clark Five (UK, 1964)
- American Tour (US, 1964)
- Coast to Coast (US, 1964)
- Weekend in London (US, 1965)
- Having a Wild Weekend (US, 1965)/Catch Us If You Can (UK, 1965)
- I Like It Like That (US, 1965)
- Try Too Hard (US, 1966)
- Satisfied with You (US, 1966)
- 5 by 5 (US, 1967)
- You Got What It Takes (US, 1967)
- Everybody Knows (US, 1968) / Everybody Knows (UK, 1967)
- 5 By 5 (1964–69) (UK, 1968)
- If Somebody Loves You (UK, 1970)
- The Dave Clark Five Play Good Old Rock & Roll (UK, 1971)
- Dave Clark & Friends (UK, 1972)
