= Lansdowne House (Holland Park) =

Former London music recording studio

Coordinates: 51.5079°N 0.2057°W

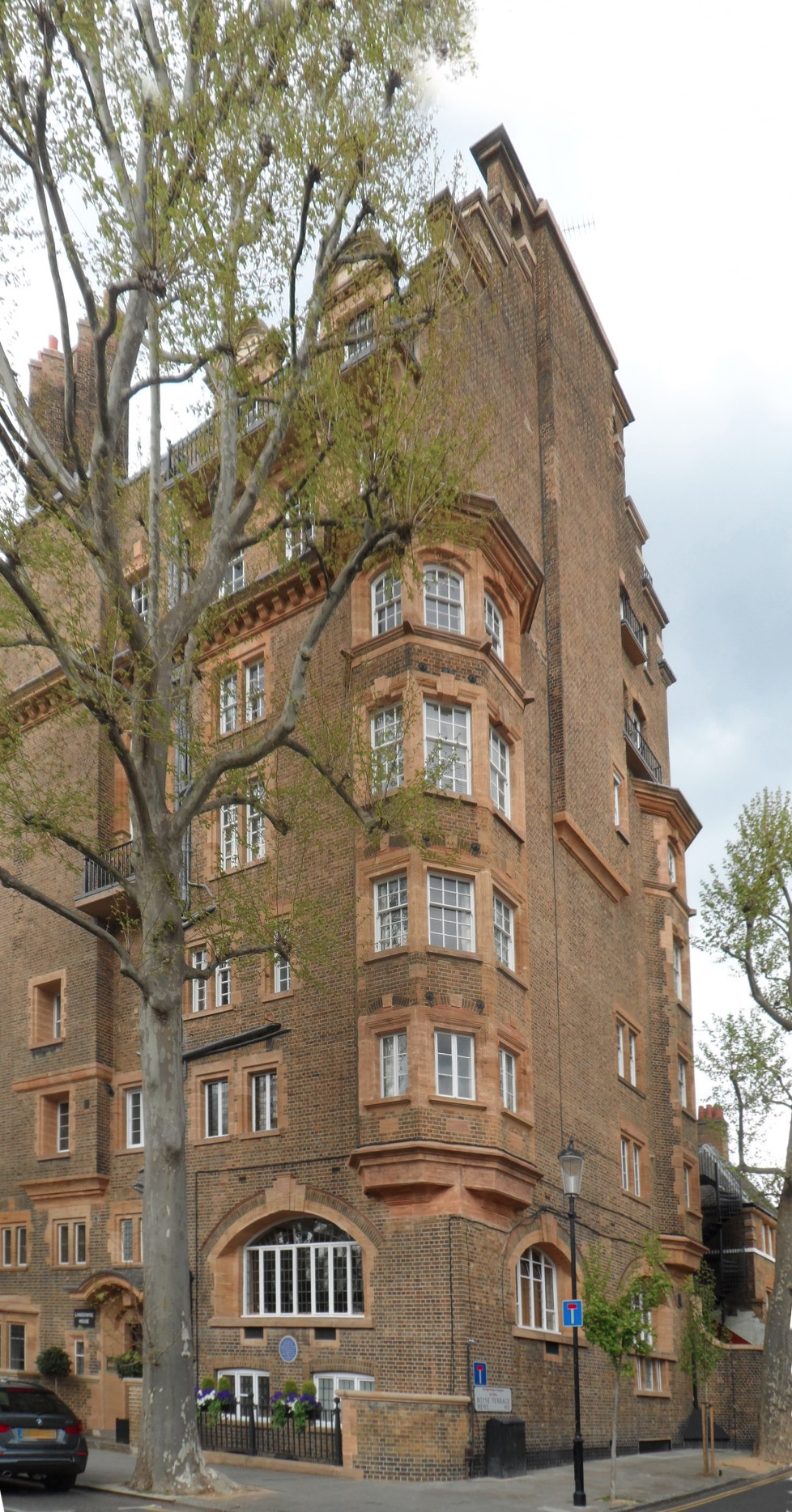
Lansdowne House by Holland Park

Lansdowne House is a Grade II listed eight-storey building on Lansdowne Road, Holland Park in London, constructed in 1902–04 by Scottish architect William Flockhart, for South African mining magnate Sir Edmund Davis. The building contained apartments and artists' workshops. Among the artists who had studios in the building in the early decades of the 20th century were Charles Ricketts, Charles Haslewood Shannon, Glyn Philpot, Vivian Forbes, James Pryde, and Frederick Cayley Robinson, who are commemorated on a blue plaque on the building.

Since 1923, the building has undergone a number of alterations and eventually consisted of 13 self-contained apartments plus a very large basement. Lansdowne House was Grade II listed in 1969.

== Recording studio ==
Lansdowne Studios was a music recording studio in Lansdowne House, which operated between 1958 and 2006. In 1957, record producer Denis Preston was looking for a property in which to set up a recording studio, and his assistant engineer Joe Meek eventually found the first floor, ground floor and basement in Lansdowne House, which had unusually high ceilings and the basement included a squash court, all of it very suitable for conversion into a studio. Preston, Meek and later engineer Adrian Kerridge then established the studio, and made their first recordings there in 1958. The studio was London's first independent music recording studio. In 1962, an enlarged control room overlooking the studio floor was opened. Kerridge later became the studio's owner.

It was used in its early years by many jazz and pop musicians, and became known for the clarity of its recordings. Musicians who recorded in the studio included Lonnie Donegan, Acker Bilk, Dave Clark Five, Donovan, Sixto Rodriguez, The Animals, Shirley Bassey, The Strawbs, Queen, Uriah Heep, the Sex Pistols, Rod Stewart, The Troggs, Art Garfunkel, Sinéad O'Connor, and Graham Parker.

== Conversion ==
The studios closed in 2006 and was sold to a bank trader and his wife, who spent three years converting the 468 m² three floors into a four-bedroom flat, featuring a raised reception room, marble floors, large enclosed courtyard and a wine cellar. Several original features from 1902 were restored, including the fireplace mantels, hardwood floors and the 90 foot chimney flue. In 2012, the renovation was featured on the television series Grand Designs (broadcast on 24 October 2012). The developers sold the flat in 2017, and it has changed hands several times since then.
