= Glad All Over =

Single by The Dave Clark Five

from the album Glad All Over
- B-side: "I Know You"
- Released: 15 November 1963 (UK); 27 December 1963 (US)
- Recorded: September 1963
- Studio: Landsowne Studios (London)
- Genre: Beat, pop rock
- Length: 2:43
- Label: Columbia DB 7154 (UK); Epic 9656 (US)
- Songwriters: Dave Clark, Mike Smith
- Producer: Dave Clark

The Dave Clark Five singles chronology
"Do You Love Me" (1963)	"Glad All Over" (1963)	"Bits and Pieces" (1964)

"Glad All Over" is a song written by Dave Clark and Mike Smith and recorded by the Dave Clark Five. Released in 1963, it was a hit and in the United States formed part of the early British Invasion, becoming the first hit of the movement by a group other than the Beatles, whose song "I Want to Hold Your Hand" it displaced at number one on the UK Singles Chart. It was the second-highest selling single of 1964 in the UK, after the Beatles' "Can't Buy Me Love".

The song is notable as the anthem of English football club Crystal Palace.

== Overview ==
"Glad All Over" featured Smith leading unison group vocals, often in call and response style, a saxophone line used not for solo decoration but underneath the whole song, and a big, "air hammer" beat that underpinned the wall of sound production known as the "Tottenham Sound". The sound engineer was Adrian Kerridge.

== Reception ==
Billboard said of the song that "here's a rocking, romping group vocal effort much akin to the Liverpool sound and the Beatles' school," stating that the song has a "solid beat and echo quality." Cash Box described it as "a happy-go-lucky pounder ... that sports that 'Mersey sound with the Liverpool beat.'"

In January 1964, it became the British group's first big hit, reaching No.1 on the UK Singles Chart and promptly kicked off the DC5 vs Beatles rivalry, removing the massively successful "I Want To Hold Your Hand" from the UK No.1. In April 1964, it reached No.6 on the American US Billboard Hot 100 chart, becoming the first British Invasion hit by a group other than the Beatles. It was also No.1 in Ireland, No.3 in Australia and No.2 in Canada. It reached No.4 in the Netherlands and No.16 in Germany.

"Glad All Over" was the No.2 selling single of 1964 in the UK (behind "Can't Buy Me Love" by the Beatles), and also had sufficient UK sales in November and December 1963 to make it the 58th best-selling single of 1963; put together these statistics suggest UK sales for "Glad All Over" of around 1,000,000 units by the end of 1964.

== Use by football and rugby teams ==
=== Crystal Palace ===
The song is most prominently known as the anthem of English football club Crystal Palace. It is played in its entirety at the start of all home games and after full-time if Palace win. Its chorus is played after home goals, once the goalscorer's name is read out, and the song has also been appropriated by fans as a chant. The song was reportedly first played at Crystal Palace's home stadium Selhurst Park by radio producer John Henty in a match against Peterborough United on 25 January 1964, the match programme of which contains the club's first mention of it. On 10 February 1968, The Dave Clark Five performed the song live at Selhurst Park.

As part of Crystal Palace's run to the 1990 FA Cup final, the club released a cover version on 26 May 1990, sung by the squad at the time. The cover, notably featuring a "Fab Four" of Alan Pardew, Andy Gray, Gary O'Reilly and Mark Bright, reached no. 47 on the UK Singles Chart, and was performed by the squad on Derek Jameson's show Jameson Tonight on Sky TV. The original golden disc of the song was purchased by the club in 2014, and sits in the Selhurst Park trophy cabinet.

=== Other football clubs ===
Across the rest of England, Blackpool have also used Glad All Over, played after a home goal is scored, with other English Football League teams including Rotherham United, Barrow, Macclesfield, Port Vale, Swindon Town, Working and Yeovil Town all known to have used it. Arsenal have used the song following wins against rivals Tottenham Hotspur.

In Scotland, Rangers used the song to sing about their striker Joe Garner with its fans trying to get it to Christmas number one in 2016. The song reached No. 31 on the UK Christmas charts, but topped the Scottish Singles Chart. Another club in the Scottish Premiership, Heart of Midlothian, also uses the song to sing about their captain Lawrence Shankland. It has also been used by Scottish Football League clubs Partick Thistle and Dunfermline Athletic when they score a goal. In Republic of Ireland, it has been used by Shamrock Rovers.

=== Rugby League ===
As of 2014, Wigan Warriors rugby league team have used it at the end of a home game at the DW Stadium if they have won.

== Covers and reissues ==
Scottish band Dead End Kids issued a cover version as a single in September 1977.

American heavy metal band Quiet Riot covered the song on their debut album, released exclusively in Japan in 1978. Edinburgh-based punk band the Rezillos covered it, also in 1978, on their debut album Can't Stand the Rezillos.

Australian band Hush covered the song in 1975; it reached No. 8 on the Australian Singles Chart and was the 64th biggest selling single in Australia in 1975. It was also included on their 1975 album Rough Tough 'n' Ready.

In 1990, the squad of football club Crystal Palace released a cover version to celebrate their run to the FA Cup final that year.

In 1993, the original Dave Clark Five version of "Glad All Over" was reissued as a single in the UK and reached No.37 on the UK Singles Chart.

American punk rock band Descendents covered the song on their eighth studio album, 9th & Walnut, released in 2021.

== Personnel ==
Partial credits.

- Dave Clark – backing vocals, drums, producer
- Mike Smith – double-tracked lead/harmony vocals, Vox Continental organ
- Lenny Davidson – backing vocals, guitars
- Rick Huxley – backing vocals, bass
- Denis Payton – backing vocals, saxophone

with

- Bobby Graham – drums
- Adrian Kerridge – engineer, co-producer

== Chart history ==
=== Weekly charts ===
Chart (1963–1964)	Peak position
Australia	3
Canada	2
Germany	16
Ireland (IRMA)	1
Netherlands	4
New Zealand (Listener)	1
UK	1
U.S. Billboard Hot 100	6
U.S. Cash Box Top 100	5

Chart (1993)	Peak position
UK	37

=== Year-end charts ===
Chart (1963)	Rank
UK	58

Chart (1964)	Rank
Australia	22
UK	2
U.S. Billboard Hot 100	23
U.S. Cash Box	9
