= Adrian Kerridge =

British recording engineer

Adrian Kerridge (27 March 1938, Harrow, Middlesex – 27 September 2016) was a British sound engineer, one of the earliest employees of the Lansdowne Studios in 1959 and eventually its owner. He helped establish the distinctive sound of the Dave Clark Five, and produced most of the KPM 1000 Series of library music discs.

== Early career ==
Kerridge grew up in Northolt, West London. Following a short period working in a music shop, he began his recording career in the early 1950s as a trainee at IBC Studios, a period interrupted by his national service, during which time he worked at the British Forces Broadcasting Service. When Joe Meek and Denis Preston left IBC in 1958 to form Lansdowne Studios, London's first independent music recording studios, Kerridge was asked to join them. He started at Lansdowne on 1 January 1959. A year later, Meek left after a row with Preston, and Kerridge took over his position as senior engineer.

== Lansdowne and the Dave Clark Five ==
At Lansdowne, Kerridge recorded the Dave Clark Five. Using close miking, and by pioneering then-experimental techniques such as direct injection, he produced a modern upfront sound, sometimes termed "The Tottenham Sound", that made their recordings unique in the late 1950s and early 1960s. With their single "Glad All Over", the Dave Clark Five unseated the Beatles' "I Want to Hold Your Hand" from its UK number one spot in January 1964. Production credits were listed as Adrian Clark, a pseudonym combining the names of Clark and Kerridge.

Kerridge was also the engineer for many other recording artists at Lansdowne, including Cliff Adams (advertising jingles), Acker Bilk ("Stranger on the Shore"), Adam Faith ("What Do You Want?"), Gene Pitney ("24 Hours From Tulsa"), Millie Small ("My Boy Lollipop") and Spencer Davis Group ("Keep on Running"). Broadcasting clients included The Black and White Minstrel Show for the BBC and The Beiderbecke Affair for Yorkshire Television. By the early 1970s, Kerridge was the manager and chief engineer of Lansdowne, and in 1980 became its co-owner with Johnny Pearson.

== Library music and CTS Studios ==
In the 1960s and into the 1970s, Kerridge was responsible for the sound of the KPM 1000 Series of library music issues and worked with other music libraries, often recording material in Germany and Belgium. Between 1960 and 1965, he often worked with Laurie Johnson while he was at KPM. In 1968, he co-founded the sound mixing console company Cadac Electronics with Clive Green.

In 1987, with Pearson, he acquired the sound stage studio CTS Studios in Wembley, running the business in parallel with Lansdowne Recording Studios. The four-studio Wembley facility closed in 2000, and the building was demolished as part of the redevelopment of Wembley Stadium in 2004. CTS relocated to the Colosseum (previously the Town Hall) in Watford.

In November 1998, Kerridge received a lifetime achievement award from the Association of Professional Recording Services, alongside Sir George Martin. He retired from Lansdowne Studios in 2006 but stayed on as chairman of the Lansdowne Group until May 2010.

== Personal life ==
Kerridge was married to Mary Edmunds for 45 years and had four children. On retirement in 2006, he sold 1 Lansdowne House. He died a decade later in September 2016, survived by his wife. Kerridge wrote an account of the earlier part of his personal and recording career (1940s–1960s) in 2013, but it was only published in 2016, a month after his death. A promised second volume never appeared.
