= Mike Smith (Dave Clark Five) =

English singer (1943–2008)

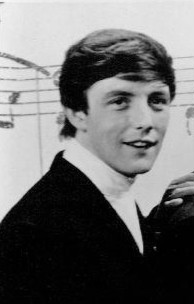
- Smith in 1964 at an Ed Sullivan Show appearance.

Background information
- Born: Michael George Smith; 6 December 1943; Edmonton, Middlesex, England
- Died: 28 February 2008 (aged 64) Aylesbury, Buckinghamshire, England
- Genres: Pop, rock, beat
- Occupation: Singer-songwriter
- Instruments: Vocals; keyboards
- Years active: 1960s–2003
- Labels: Columbia (EMI); Epic
- Formerly of: The Dave Clark Five

Michael George Smith (6 December 1943 – 28 February 2008) was an English singer, songwriter and music producer.

In the 1960s, Smith was the lead vocalist and keyboard player for the Dave Clark Five. The band was a leading unit in the British Invasion of the United States, and were the Beatles' main British rivals before the emergence of the Rolling Stones.

== Biography ==
Smith was born in Edmonton, Middlesex (now part of north London), only child of George William Henry Smith, a bus conductor, later interior decorator, and Maudie (née Willis). His parents found he had a natural ability as a pianist that surfaced as early as age five. Smith started lessons in classical piano, and at age 13 passed the entrance exams at Trinity Music College in London.

=== Career ===
Smith first met Dave Clark when they were both members on the same football team for the St. George Boys Club. By his mid-teens, Smith had developed a strong vocal delivery, while idolising Little Richard, among other American rock & roll stars. At age 17, while working for a finance company, Smith was invited by Clark to join his band, which was busy rebuilding itself around the core of Clark and rhythm guitarist (later bassist) Rick Huxley, after having recently lost its lead singer.

==== Dave Clark Five ====
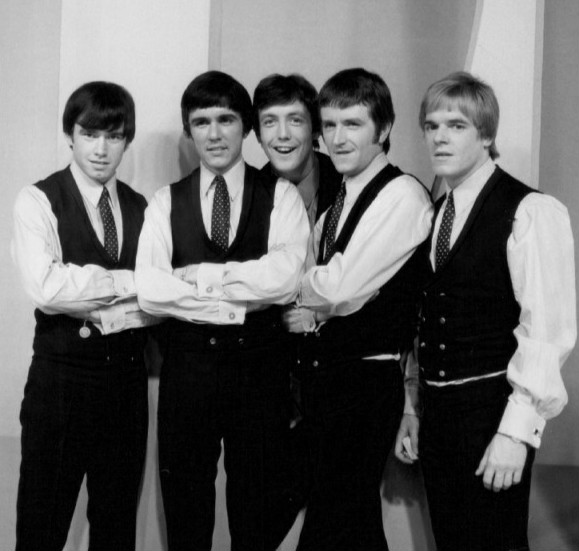
Dave Clark Five The Ed Sullivan Show appearance, 1966. From left: Denis Payton, Dave Clark, Mike Smith, Rick Huxley and Lenny Davidson.

With Smith on vocals, piano or organ (and occasionally playing guitar in later years), the new Dave Clark Five was completed with the additions of saxophonist Denis (Denny) Payton and lead guitarist Lenny Davidson, who was auditioned on Smith's recommendation.

Smith made his recording debut, at age 18, with the single "I Knew It All the Time" b/w (flip side) "That's What I Said" produced by Pye Records in June 1962 and credited to the unknown band The Dave Clark Five featuring Mike Smith. Performed in a style midway between early British beat and the bolder 1960s sounds that were developing, it was a powerful record to be issued while the Beatles were still developing their first recording deal.

Due to his role as lead singer, Smith was considered the other star of the band, less visible by name than drummer/founder Clark but still at the centre of the group's sound as lead singer and keyboard player.

Smith's singing showed the strong influence of Elvis Presley during the period of "The Girl of My Best Friend", "(Marie's the Name) His Latest Flame", and "Little Sister". Due to his lead singing, Mike was very popular around the world on DC5 concert tours, especially in the Philippines. The rock band was so much welcomed at their performance at Smart Araneta Coliseum on 23–26 April 1965. Filipinos loved his rendition of hits Because and Hurting Inside.

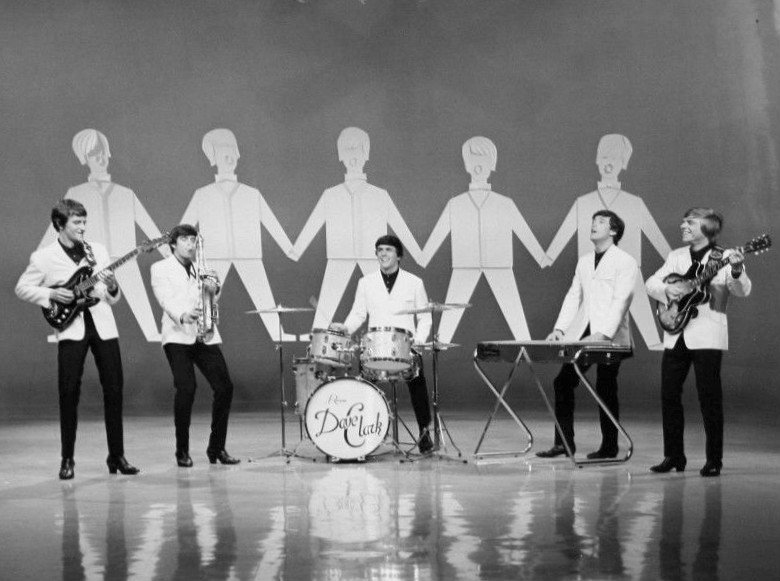
Smith (second from right) with the Dave Clark Five on The Dean Martin Show in September 1965

Smith's rich and raspy baritone voice and keyboards were clearly evident in the band's sound over seven years: during their two major years of success in 1964–1965 and continuing five years after the British Invasion died down in America, until the group disbanded in 1970.

==== Clark & Smith ====
Smith continued working with Clark until 1973, mainly to help the drummer/bandleader fulfill contractual commitments, as "Dave Clark & Friends". Smith & Clark released cover versions of popular hits such as "Rub It In", "Sweet City Woman", and "Na Na Hey Hey (Kiss Him Goodbye)".

==== Producer ====
In 1976, Smith recorded an album titled Smith & d'Abo, with former Manfred Mann singer Mike d'Abo.

Most of Smith's work in the 1970s and 1980s, however, was as a producer and songwriter, and Smith was successful working on commercials (commercial ads), authoring jingles for many products.

==== Mike Smith's Rock Engine ====
Smith returned to performing in the late 1990s, and discovered he still had many fans on the oldies circuit. Having moved to Spain, Smith had met four musicians who shared his dedication to playing for fun above all else: lead guitarist Doug Lean; bassist Curt Sandell; drummer Paul Skelton; and saxophone player Frank Mead.

After rehearsing at each other's houses on the Costa del Sol, the group made their concert debut in August 2002, when they played a benefit for a charity of abused children and raised $100,000. Beginning in March 2003, Mike Smith's Rock Engine occasional tours generated very enthusiastic responses from audiences. Smith appeared to be emerging as a popular star in his own right.

=== Later life ===
Mike Smith was divorced from his first wife Jill Smith, a former horse trainer who became a celebrity hairdresser. They had one son, James. Mike lived with his longtime partner, Jane Geerts, for 18 years between 1980 and 1998.

In October 2001 Mike married "Charlie" (real name: Arlene Gorek), with whom he had re-established contact in 1999, having dated 35 years earlier.

On 1 June 2003, James, then a 24-year-old professional diver, died in a diving accident in the Red Sea. James never surfaced after making the dive. Smith established a memorial to his son at Egypt's Blue Hole, a popular diving location, with a plaque reading, "Don't let fear stand in the way of your dreams."

Three months later, on 13 September 2003, nearing his 60th birthday, Smith was injured in an accident in his home in Spain which severely damaged his spinal cord. He tried to climb a 7 ft gate after locking himself out of his villa, fell heavily, and landed on his head. His spine fractured in three places leaving him permanently paralyzed from the waist down and in his right arm, with very little movement in his left arm.

Following four years of treatment, Smith was released from hospital on his 64th birthday, 6 December 2007. On 19 December 2007, Bruce Springsteen, a longtime friend and fan, dedicated "Born to Run" to Smith and his wife, Charlie, who were attending his concert at the O2 in London.

=== Death ===
Smith died on 28 February 2008 at Stoke Mandeville Hospital in Aylesbury, Buckinghamshire, at the age of 64, of pneumonia, a complication from his earlier accident. He died 11 days before he was to be inducted into the Rock and Roll Hall of Fame as a member of the Dave Clark Five. Smith left an estate worth £66,000.

== Compositions ==
Many of the seventeen (17) Top-40 U.S. hits for the Dave Clark Five (DC5) were written by Mike Smith and Dave Clark, including "Glad All Over" (No. 6), "Bits and Pieces" (No. 4), "Can't You See That's She Mine" (No. 4), "Come Home" (No. 14), "Try Too Hard" (No. 12), and "Please Tell Me Why" (No. 28). Mike Smith and Clark also co-wrote and performed "Having A Wild Weekend" from the movie Catch Us If You Can, renamed Having a Wild Weekend for its U.S.premiere. They sold more than 100 million records, sold out five consecutive world tours and six in the U.S. including 12 consecutive shows at Carnegie Hall, and made a record-setting 18 appearances on The Ed Sullivan Show (New York City).

When the DC5 disbanded, Smith first collaborated with singer Mike d'Abo, former lead singer of Manfred Mann. They made one self-titled album, which has recently been reissued by Sony in Japan. Andrew Lloyd Webber and Tim Rice recruited Mike Smith to sing on the recording of their Evita before it ever hit the stage, earning him another gold record. Smith also produced recordings for Shirley Bassey and four gold albums for one of Europe's top male vocalists, Michael Ball.

Smith can be heard in the Applebee's Restaurant commercial that uses "I Like It Like That" and in Target's campaign, which uses "Bits and Pieces" : one of dozens of commercials he has made over the years, employing his distinctive "Smith sound." He also taped an interview and performance for a TV special on The British Music Invasion which aired in the U.S. on TLC in 2003. The Dave Clark Five are known as one of the most influential of the British groups and, as Steve Van Zandt points out, "they actually made the most powerful records of anybody... They were a tremendous band."

== Discography ==
(See DC5 discography at The Dave Clark Five discography)
