= Dave Clark (musician) =

English musician (born 1939)

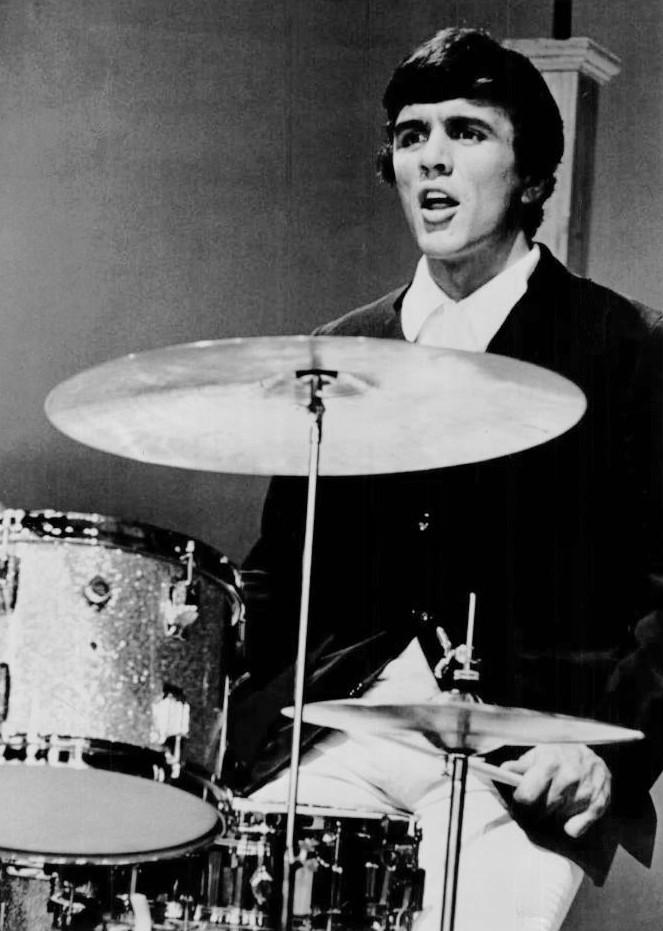
- Clark in a 1965 US television appearance with the Dave Clark Five

Background information
- Born: David Clark; 15 December 1939 (age 86); Tottenham, Middlesex, England
- Genre: Beat
- Occupations: Musician; songwriter; record producer
- Instruments: Drums; vocals
- Years active: 1957–present

David Clark (born 15 December 1939) is an English musician, songwriter, record producer and entrepreneur. Clark was the leader, drummer, and manager of the 1960s beat group the Dave Clark Five, the first British Invasion band to follow the Beatles to the United States in 1964. In 2008, Clark and his band were inducted into the Rock and Roll Hall of Fame.

== Biography ==
=== Early life ===
Clark was born in Tottenham, then lived in Middlesex. He left school without qualifications at the age of 15 and claims to have become a film stuntman, performing in over 40 films (although IMDB only gives him four pre-fame film credits). In the late 1950s he bought a set of drums, taught himself how to play them, and formed a skiffle band to raise funds so that his football team could travel to the Netherlands. The skiffle band grew into the Dave Clark Five, with Clark their leader, co-songwriter, manager, and producer.

=== The Dave Clark Five ===
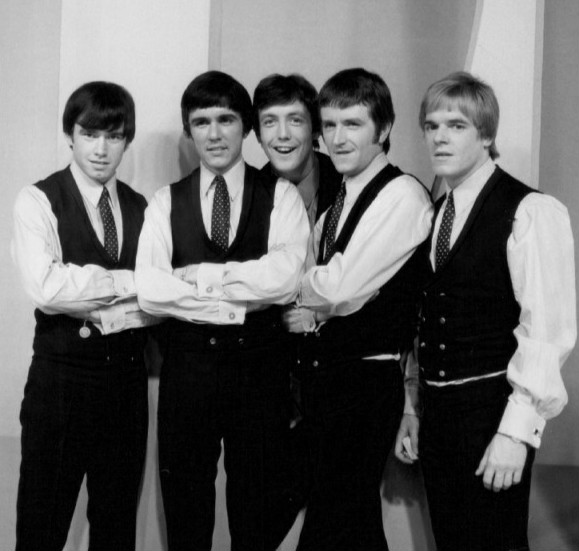
The Dave Clark Five on The Ed Sullivan Show in 1966. From left: Denis Payton, Dave Clark, Mike Smith, Rick Huxley and Lenny Davidson

The Dave Clark Five grew in popularity in the UK. They unseated the Beatles' "I Want to Hold Your Hand" from its number one spot in the UK singles charts in January 1964 with "Glad All Over". The British press, briefly, called them the Beatles' "most serious threat". The Dave Clark Five were the first British Invasion band to follow the Beatles to the United States in 1964, where they achieved 14 top 20 hits, eight of which were consecutive. They also appeared on The Ed Sullivan Show more times than any other English group. Dave Clark became a popular name for babies in the 1960s.

Andrew Loog Oldham, former manager of the Rolling Stones, said of the band's early success as rivals to the Beatles: "If the Beatles ever looked over their shoulders, it was not the Stones they saw. They saw the Dave Clark 5 or Herman's Hermits."

The band broke up in 1970, and Clark stopped drumming in 1972 after he broke four knuckles in a tobogganing accident.

=== Later works ===
Clark later wrote a science fiction stage musical, Time, which debuted in 1986. It played for two years in London's West End, starring Cliff Richard (replaced later by David Cassidy). The musical also launched a concept album, likewise titled Time, which featured Richard, Freddie Mercury, Leo Sayer, Stevie Wonder and Dionne Warwick. Two million copies were sold and it spun off several hit singles.

Clark is an entrepreneur and a multi-millionaire. He owns a £12 million house in West London. From the outset, Clark owned the rights to all the Dave Clark Five music masters. It is claimed that other songwriters in the band were required to give copyright ownership of their tunes to Clark, even if he did not co-write them. In the late 1960s, in addition to managing his band, Clark began directing and producing for television. In 1968 he made a television production, Hold On, It's the Dave Clark Five. In the 1980s he acquired the rights to the 1960s UK music show Ready Steady Go!.

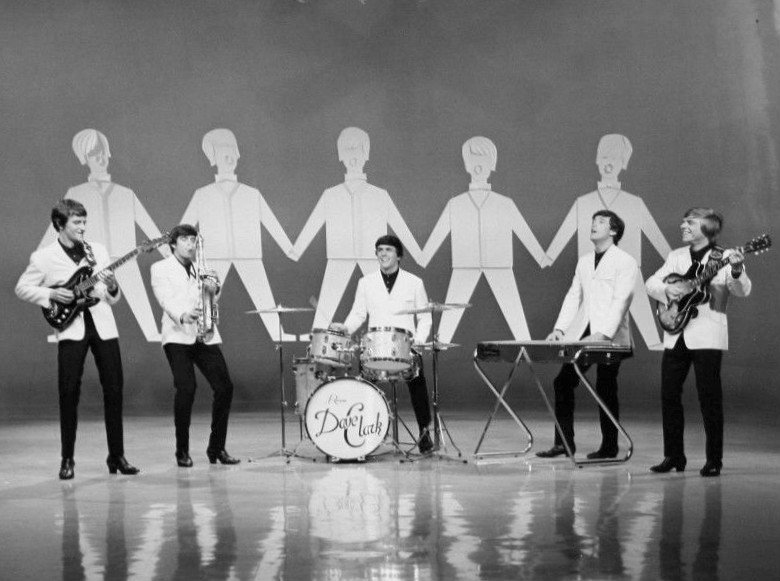
Clark (middle) with the Dave Clark Five on The Dean Martin Show in September 1965

On the release of a Dave Clark Five British hits album in the mid-1970s, Clark resided in the US for a year, thus avoiding paying UK taxes in Britain on the proceeds of that release. The British government challenged this but lost the case in court.

In 1993, Clark released remastered versions of all the Dave Clark Five singles on a CD, Glad All Over Again.

== Personal life ==
Clark was a close friend of Freddie Mercury, whom he had known since 1976; he was by the Queen singer's bedside when he died on 24 November 1991.

== Honours and legacy ==
In 2008, marking the 50th anniversary of the founding of the band, the Dave Clark Five were inducted into the Rock and Roll Hall of Fame. Clark, making a rare public appearance, and the two other surviving band members at the time accepted the award on behalf of the group. In 2014, Clark wrote, produced, appeared in, and partly presented, the 115-minute documentary The Dave Clark Five and Beyond: Glad All Over.

== Discography ==
Dave Clark Five

(See DC5 discography at The Dave Clark Five discography)

Solo

- Time (1986)
