= 5 By 5 (1964–69) =

Studio album by the Dave Clark Five
- Released: 1 November 1968
- Genre: Pop rock, soul
- Length: 36:41
- Label: Columbia; SCX 6309
- Producer: Dave Clark

The Dave Clark Five UK chronology
| Everybody Knows (1967) | 5 By 5 (1964–69) (1968) | If Somebody Loves You (1970) |

Singles from 5 By 5 (1964–69)
- 1. "Just a Little Bit Now" / "You Don't Play Me Around"; 2. "Please Stay" / "Forget"; 3. "The Red Balloon" / "Maze of Love"; 4. "No One Can Break a Heart Like You" / " You Don't Want My Lovin'"

5 By 5 (1964–69) is a British album by the Dave Clark Five, released in November 1968. The subtitle of the album was "14 Titles by Dave Clark Five". It contains the band's two big hit singles "The Red Balloon" and the ballad "No One Can Break a Heart Like You". Alongside this, it also included two American hit singles, cover of the Majors soul song "Just a Little Bit Now" and "Please Stay" originally recorded by American band the Drifters.

== Overview ==
Although the Dave Clark Five released twelve albums in the United States, this was only their fourth UK album. It had the same title as their tenth US album, yet did not contain any of the same songs. The artwork was a copy of another US LP "Everybody Knows" and comes in a textured jacket. The years "1964–69" in the album title gave the impression that it was a compilation album, but this was not true. The LP was released on the fifth anniversary of the Dave Clark Five's professionalization, and that's what the timestamp referred to (the record was not released in 1969, but at the end of 1968). Still, the collection symbolically contained two older songs. "When I Am Alone" originally released under the shorter title "When I'm Alone" on the US album "Having A Wild Weekend" (1965) and "I Still Need You" from the US album "Satisfied with You" (1966). The song "Just a Little Bit Now" was recorded in late 1967 and first appeared on the US album "Everybody Knows" in January 1968 (under the shortened title "A Little Bit Now").

The album was produced by Dave Clark. The writing was mostly the work of Mike Smith, Lenny Davidson and Denis Payton. Although Dave Clark was also listed as a co-writer, his creative contribution was only as producer. The album was divided into a faster rockier first side (labeled "Go!!" on the cover) and a slower second side (labeled "Slow!!"). The song "No One Can Break a Heart Like You" was sung by guitarist Lenny Davidson instead of the band's lead singer Mike Smith. The UK top 10 hit "The Red Balloon" is a rare case of drummer Dave Clark singing solo (partly in French).

This is the band's only album (from the core series) that Dave Clark has not released in a remastered collection on Spotify in 2019.

== Reception ==
Professional ratings
Review scores
| Source | Rating |
|---|---|
| AllMusic | 3/5 stars |

"5 By 5" was well received by critics, but although the record followed several hit singles and the Dave Clark Five simultaneously released a new hit "Live in the Sky", the LP did not enter the UK charts (which were only published as Top 20 at the time). Melody Maker wrote in the official review, "Well-produced and highly commercial album which will sell." And highlighted the quality of singer Mike Smith. Allen Evans from New Musical Express wrote, "All the tracks have that organ-drums-guitar crisp sound and the vocals, by various members but mostly Mike Smith on solos. ... A happy piece of pop, as always from producer Dave Clark."

Record Mirror highlighted several points, "First, that there is a tremendous sense of ambitiousness in the way Dave is producing his own records now. Second, that there is definitely a sudden upsurge in the boys' popularity at all levels now. Third, that Mike Smith is still one of the most interestingly exciting singers in the business." Disc and Music Echo wrote, "The album will please their fans, it won't exactly blow the minds of the unbiased".

== Track listing ==
Side one
| No. | Title | Writer(s) | Length |
|---|---|---|---|
| 1. | "Just a Little Bit Now" | Jerry Ragovoy, Ed Marshall | 2:47 |
| 2. | "Maze of Love" | Dave Clark, Mike Smith | 2:39 |
| 3. | "Return My Love" | Dave Clark, Mike Smith | 2:58 |
| 4. | "Best Day's Work" | Dave Clark, Mike Smith | 2:38 |
| 5. | "Who Do You Think You're Talking To" | Dave Clark, Lenny Davidson | 2:09 |
| 6. | "Got Love If You Want It" | Brian Hugg, Mike Hugg | 2:11 |
| 7. | "The Red Balloon" | Raymond Froggatt | 3:04 |

Side two
| No. | Title | Writer(s) | Length |
|---|---|---|---|
| 1. | "Please Stay" | Burt Bacharach, Bob Hilliard | 3:19 |
| 2. | "Devoted To You" | Dave Clark, Lenny Davidson | 2:54 |
| 3. | "3406" | Dave Clark, Mike Smith | 2:07 |
| 4. | "Away From the Noises" | Dave Clark, Denis Payton | 2:49 |
| 5. | "When I Am Alone" | Dave Clark, Mike Smith | 2:31 |
| 6. | "I Still Need You" | Dave Clark, Lenny Davidson | 2:21 |
| 7. | "No One Can Break a Heart Like You" | Les Reed, Jackie Rae | 2:37 |

== Personnel ==
The Dave Clark Five

- Dave Clark – backing vocals, drums, lead vocals on "The Red Balloon"
- Mike Smith – lead vocals (except "The Red Balloon" and "No One Can Break a Heart Like You"), keyboards
- Lenny Davidson – backing vocals, lead and rhythm guitars, lead vocals on "No One Can Break a Heart Like You"
- Rick Huxley – backing vocals, bass
- Denis Payton – backing vocals, tenor saxophone, rhythm guitar

Additional musician

- Stan Roderick, Bert Ezzard, Eddie Blair – horn section
