= Everybody Knows (Dave Clark Five album) =

Studio album by the Dave Clark Five
- Released: January 1968
- Genre: Pop rock
- Length: 26:45
- Labels: Epic; BN 26354 / LN 24354
- Producer: Dave Clark

The Dave Clark Five US chronology
You Got What It Takes (1967)	Everybody Knows (1968)

Singles from Everybody Knows
- 1. "You Must Have Been a Beautiful Baby" / "Man in a Pin Striped Suit"; 2. "A Little Bit Now" / "You Don't Play Me Around"; 3. "Red and Blue" / "Concentration Baby"; 4. "Everybody Knows" / "Inside and Out"

Alternative cover
- UK album, 1967 (EMI)

Everybody Knows is the twelfth US album by the British band the Dave Clark Five. Released in January 1968 on Epic Records, it contained four hit singles, a rock cover version of the old Bing Crosby hit "You Must Have Been a Beautiful Baby", the band's guitarist Lenny Davidson's song "Red and Blue", cover of the Majors soul song "A Little Bit Now", and the UK chartbuster "Everybody Knows". It is the band's last American album and the first not to enter the Billboard Top 200 chart.

== Overview ==
The album combined modern musical trends of soul and rock and roll ("You Must Have Been a Beautiful Baby", "Concentration Baby", "A Little Bit Now"), powerful ballads ("Everybody Knows", "I'll Do the Best I Can", "At the Place") with a slight influence of psychedelic music ("Lost in His Dreams"). LP was produced by Dave Clark himself. Most of the songs were composed by the band members. The album's biggest UK hit "Everybody Knows" (written by Barry Mason and Les Reed) was sung by guitarist Lenny Davidson instead of the band's lead singer Mike Smith. LP was released in both mono (LN 24354) and stereo (BN 26354) versions. The artwork featured sepia-toned photographs of the band members, but the author was not credited (they used the same cover for their later UK album 5 By 5).

== Reception ==
Professional ratings
Review scores
Source	Rating
AllMusic	3/5 stars

Everybody Knows was the first Dave Clark Five album not to enter the US charts, and the band therefore focused on the UK market, where three more albums followed. The reason for the failure in America may have been the group's declining popularity, noticeable in the success of their singles in the US (the UK smash hit "Everybody Knows" remained at No. 43 on Billboard), but also the delayed release, which missed the 1967 Christmas market and wasn't offered until January 1968 (the LP was released in the UK in December 1967).

Billboard magazine wrote in the official review, "There's something old and something new – and they both register. The new is Everybody Knows, with the soft sound not commonly associated with DCF. And in their traditional kick is You Must Have Been A Beautiful Baby. It all adds up to a solid effort, both old and new." Cashbox magazine wrote, "Presently on the charts with the title tune of this LP, the Dave Clark Five should have no difficulty making the charts with the album itself. Rock foot-stompers and ballads make up the bill of fare. One of the grooviest tracks is a swinging, hard-driving updating of You Must Have Been A Beautiful Baby..."

In a retrospective review for AllMusic, Richie Unterberger wrote about the songs, "Some of them saw the group competently, if not excitingly, adapt to trends in late-'60s production with an increased brassiness, as they do on the soul-pop tunes A Little Bit Now and Inside and Out." And he concluded the review with the opinion, "It adds up to an album that has some appeal for serious Dave Clark Five fans, but isn't essential listening for more discriminating listeners."

== Track listing (US version) ==
Side one
No.	Title	Writer(s)	Length
1.	"Everybody Knows"	Barry Mason, Les Reed	2:15
2.	"A Little Bit Now"	Jerry Ragovoy, Ed Marshall	2:38
3.	"At The Place"	Dave Clark, Lenny Davidson	2:23
4.	"Inside And Out"	Dave Clark, Mike Smith	2:45
5.	"Red And Blue"	Dave Clark, Lenny Davidson	2:32

Side two
No.	Title	Writer(s)	Length
1.	"You Must Have Been A Beautiful Baby"	Harry Warren, Johnny Mercer	2:18
2.	"Good Love Is Hard To Find"	Dave Clark, Mike Smith	2:07
3.	"Lost In His Dreams"	Dave Clark, Denis Payton	1:58
4.	"Concentration Baby"	Dave Clark, Mike Smith	2:30
5.	"Hold On Tight"	Dave Clark, Lenny Davidson	2:07
6.	"I'll Do The Best I Can"	Dave Clark, Mike Smith	2:37

== UK version ==
In late 1967, the album was also released in the UK, but in mono only. It featured a modified 16-track list that included a few songs from the previous US albums You Got What It Takes ("Blueberry Hill", "Tabatha Twitchit", "I've Got To Have A Reason", "Play Me Around", "You Got What It Takes"), Satisfied with You ("Go On"), and 5 by 5 ("Sitting Here Baby", "Bernerdette"). The British and Canadian editions had different artwork referencing the You Got What It Takes US LP.

== Track listing (UK version) ==
Side one
No.	Title	Writer(s)	Length
1.	"You Got What It Takes"	Tyran Carlo, Gwen Fuqua, Berry Gordy Jr., Marv Johnson	2:59
2.	"I'll Do The Best I Can"	Dave Clark, Mike Smith	2:37
3.	"At The Place"	Dave Clark, Lenny Davidson	2:23
4.	"Little Bit Strong"	Dave Clark, Lenny Davidson	1:21
5.	"Good Love Is Hard To Find"	Dave Clark, Mike Smith	2:07
6.	"Blueberry Hill"	Vincent Rose, Larry Stock, Al Lewis	2:18
7.	"Tabatha Twitchit"	Barry Mason, Les Reed	2:25
8.	"Everybody Knows"	Barry Mason, Les Reed	2:15

Side two
No.	Title	Writer(s)	Length
1.	"You Must Have Been A Beautiful Baby"	Harry Warren, Johnny Mercer	2:18
2.	"Lost In His Dreams"	Dave Clark, Denis Payton	1:58
3.	"Go On"	Dave Clark, Lenny Davidson	2:26
4.	"Sitting Here Baby"	Dave Clark, Mike Smith	2:40
5.	"Bernedette"	Dave Clark, Mike Smith	2:11
6.	"I've Got to Have a Reason"	Dave Clark, Lenny Davidson	1:53
7.	"(You Don't) Play Me Around"	Dave Clark, Mike Smith	2:19
8.	"Inside And Out"	Dave Clark, Mike Smith	2:45

== Personnel ==
The Dave Clark Five

- Dave Clark - backing vocals, drums
- Mike Smith - lead vocals, keyboards
- Lenny Davidson - backing vocals, lead and rhythm guitars, lead vocals on "Everybody Knows"
- Rick Huxley - backing vocals, bass
- Denis Payton - backing vocals, tenor saxophone, lead vocals on "Lost In His Dreams"
