= Try Too Hard =

Studio album by the Dave Clark Five
- Released: 31 May 1966
- Genres: Pop rock, beat
- Length: 20:08
- Labels: Epic; LN 24198
- Producer: Dave Clark

The Dave Clark Five US chronology
I Like It Like That (1965)	Try Too Hard (1966)	Satisfied with You (1966)

Singles from Try Too Hard
- 1. "Try Too Hard" / "All Night Long" Released: 25 March 1966

Try Too Hard is the eighth American album by the English rock band the Dave Clark Five. It was released on 31 May 1966 on the Epic label. It followed the Top 20 hit of the same name. The album reached No. 77 on the Billboard 200 album chart and No. 25 in Cashbox.

== Background ==
At a time when rival groups such as the Beatles, the Rolling Stones and the Beach Boys were increasingly experimenting with sound in the recording studio, the Dave Clark Five also offered a sonically modern album. It tried to combine rock songs with edgy guitar ("I Really Love You", "It Don't Feel Good") with sophisticated melodies in different genre styles ("Looking In", "Ever Since You've Been Away", "Today").

== Artwork ==
The album cover art shows the band in a Jaguar E-Type owned by Dave Clark. He also appeared with the same car in the Catch Us If You Can movie and the band posing in the car on the cover of the UK soundtrack album from that film.

== Release and reception ==
Professional ratings
Review scores
Source	Rating
AllMusic	2.5/5 stars

The album was released on 31 May 1966 in mono and stereo versions. The electronically re-channeled stereo version makes the whole album sound more psychedelic. But Dave Clark was not happy with the label when he found out since it was originally recorded in true stereo. The record was less successful than its predecessors, being the band's first album not to make the Top 50 Billboard LP Charts, but still hit No. 77.

The album has not been released in the UK. In Canada, it was retitled "At the Scene" and included a hit single of the same name.

Billboard magazine wrote in the official review, "With the group's recent singles hit featured as the title tune, the album will sell well in the teen market. There are only 10 cuts in the package, but they're all solid, teen-aimed rockers. I Know and I Never Will are outstanding." Cashbox magazine wrote, "Self-penned (that is group penned) tunes, that become big hits, is the forte of the Dave Clark Five and this set typifies that phenomenon. With the lead track being the group’s most recent smash and the other eleven being in that same bag that has long pleased the quintet’s innumerable devotees, this set should be a top-notch sales item."

In his AllMusic retrospective review of the release, Bruce Eder wrote, "DC5 would allow their music to evolve. From the crisp piano chords and lean, restrained guitar and sax sound, as well as the upbeat tone of Try Too Hard there was change in the air from the opening seconds of this LP."

== Track listing ==
Side one
No.	Title	Writer(s)	Length
1.	"Try Too Hard"	Dave Clark, Mike Smith	2:10
2.	"Today"	Dave Clark, Lenny Davidson	2:10
3.	"I Never Will"	Dave Clark, Denis Payton	1:54
4.	"Looking In"	Dave Clark, Lenny Davidson	2:03
5.	"Ever Since You've Been Away"	Dave Clark, Denis Payton	1:34

Side two
No.	Title	Writer(s)	Length
1.	"Somebody Find A New Love"	Dave Clark, Mike Smith	2:06
2.	"I Really Love You"	Dave Clark, Lenny Davidson	1:53
3.	"It Don't Feel Good"	Dave Clark, Denis Payton	1:41
4.	"Scared Of Falling In Love"	Dave Clark, Mike Smith	1:56
5.	"I Know"	Dave Clark, Lenny Davidson	2:38

== Personnel ==
The Dave Clark Five

- Dave Clark - drums, backing vocals
- Mike Smith - keyboards, lead vocals
- Lenny Davidson - electric guitars, backing vocals
- Rick Huxley - bass guitar, backing vocals
- Denis Payton - tenor saxophone, backing vocals

== Charts ==
Chart (1966)	Peak position
US Billboard Top LP's	77
US Cash Box Top 100 Albums	25
US Record World 100 Top LP's	22
