= Try Too Hard (song) =

1966 single by the Dave Clark Five

- Swedish single sleeve

Single by the Dave Clark Five

from the album Try Too Hard
- B-side: "All Night Long"
- Released: 11 March 1966
- Studio: Lansdowne, London
- Length: 2:07
- Label: Columbia
- Songwriters: Dave Clark; Mike Smith
- Producer: Dave Clark

The Dave Clark Five UK singles chronology
"Over and Over" (1965)	"Try Too Hard" (1966)	"Look Before You Leap" (1966)

The Dave Clark Five US singles chronology
"At the Scene" (1966)	"Try Too Hard" (1966)	"Please Tell Me Why" (1966)

Audio
- "Try Too Hard" on YouTube

"Try Too Hard" is a song written by Dave Clark and Mike Smith and first recorded by their band the Dave Clark Five. Musically, it features a notable piano performance by Smith alongside an adventurous rhythm. The single was released in both the UK and US during March 1966 with "All Night Long" as the B-side. Although "Try Too Hard" failed to chart in the UK, it was a hit in the US, reaching number 12 on the Billboard Hot 100 and the top-ten on the Cash Box and Record World charts. It received positive reviews upon release, with the beat being praised. Retrospectively, multiple music writers has noted it to be one of the band's best singles

== Recording and composition ==
"Try Too Hard" was written by the songwriting partnership between drummer Dave Clark and organist Mike Smith. As with the Dave Clark Five's other output from the 1960s, "Catch Us If You Can" was recorded at Lansdowne Studios in Holland Park, London. Present in the studio was audio engineer Adrian Kerridge, who also "recorded most of the band's early core hit catalog". According to Bruce Eder of AllMusic, the song featured "crisp piano chords", "lean, restrained guitar and sax". Writer Ken Barnes opined the song featured a "motoring pace" from the drumming alongside "propulsive" piano playing that was syncopated. Similarly he described the track as a "piano showcase" for Smith, and believed it showed progression in the band's musical output. Joe Queenan of The Guardian described the single as "rhythmically adventurous". Clark himself believed it was a more sophisticated version of "Any Way You Want It".

== Release and commercial performance ==
"Try Too Hard" was initially released by Columbia Records as a single in the UK on 11 March 1966. A US release followed through Epic Records on 25 March 1966. The B-side of the single in both countries was "All Night Long", a Bo Diddley-inspired instrumental track. The Dave Clark Five appeared on The Ed Sullivan Show on 24 April 1966, performing "Try Too Hard", "At the Scene" and "Catch Us If You Can". Though it did not chart in their native UK, "Try Too Hard" entered the Billboard Hot 100 on 2 April 1966 at number 86, before peaking at number 12 on 7 May. On the national charts published by Cash Box and Record World, "Try Too Hard" reached the top-ten, reaching number ten and nine, respectively.

"Try Too Hard" was eventually included as the title track of the album with the same name, which Epic Records released in the US on 31 May 1966. "Try Too Hard" was also included on most of the Dave Clark Five's compilation albums, such as Glad All Over Again and The History of The Dave Clark Five (both 1993); The Hits (2008); and All The Hits (2020).

== Critical reception ==
In a blinded experiment for the Melody Maker, Steve Marriott of the Small Faces believed the single swung alot, praising the drum performance. Though he identified the performers as British, he was shocked when it was revealed to be a Dave Clark Five song, describing it as "the best thing they've ever done". Writing for Record Mirror, Norman Jopling and Peter Jones praise the song for its "great beat", describing it as a "one of those typical 'Clark-ian songs" that features changes in both mood and tempo with "interesting lyrics". They believed it to be "infectious after a spin or two". Billboard described the single as a "hard -drivin' rhythm rocker" that was a "strong No. 1 chart contender". Cash Box described the single as "a rollicking, fast-moving, rhythmic ode about an unhappy guy", noting the song to be commercial. Record World believed the single to have "lots of pizazz".

Retrospectively, music critic Richie Unterberger described "Try Too Hard" as a "worthy lesser-known hit". "Try Too Hard" is one of Clark's favorite songs by the band, with Barnes opining it to be the Dave Clark Five's "best-ever record", stating that the ranks with the "top pop creations of the era". Similarly, The Strange Brew believed that both "Try Too Hard" and "All Night Long" "surely ranks as one of the finest singles of the ‘60s".

== Chart performance ==
Weekly chart performance for "Try Too Hard"
Chart (1966)	Peak position
Australia (Kent Music Report)	74
Canada (RPM 100)	5
Malaysia (Radio Malaysia)	8
Singapore (Radio Singapore)	5
US Billboard Hot 100	12
US Cash Box Top 100	10
US Record World 100 Top Pops	9
