= Guyson E12 =

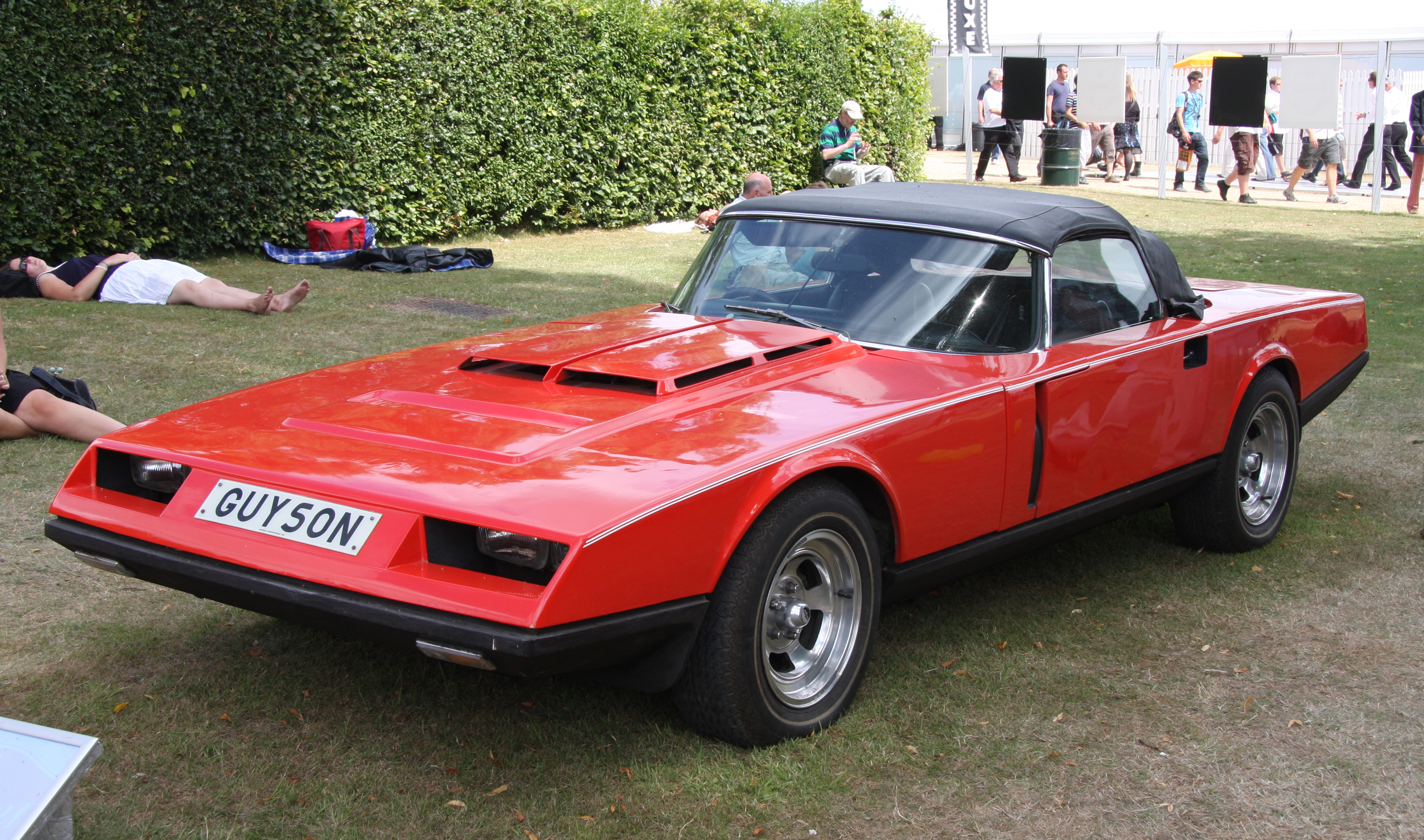
- Jim Thomson's E12 with the optional engine upgrade

Overview
- Production: 1974; 2 converted
- Designer: William Towns

Body and chassis
- Layout: FR layout
- Related: Jaguar E-Type (Series III)

Powertrain
- Engine: 5.3 L Jaguar V12 engine

The Guyson E12 was a run of two cars commissioned by hill-climb champion Jim Thomson and built by William Towns. It was a rebodied series III Jaguar E-Type, the first of which came about as a result of Thomson crashing his Jaguar in 1972. The first model was completed for Thomson in 1974, with Towns subsequently converting his own E-Type. Towns reportedly had planned to offer the conversion commercially for around £2000 on top of the E-type’s £3300 list price but decided against it, as the E-Type was nearing the end of its production run.

== Specifications ==
The E12 features a fiberglass body that attaches mostly to the existing superstructure of the E-Type, secured with screws and resin. This method leaves a lot of the original panel work intact and allows for the car to be returned mostly to standard form if desired by removing the panels and refitting the original bonnet and boot lid. The first E12 built, owned by Jim Thomson, features an upgraded version of the standard Jaguar V12 engine tuned by Ron Beatty to produce 345 bhp (257 kW) (for reference, the standard engine in the E-Type produces 251 bhp (187 kW)) through the help of six 44mm Weber LDF carburetors. This upgrade required the fitting of a hood scoop as the carburetors did not clear the standard hood. The second E12 built, owned by Towns himself, did not feature the upgrade as he thought it would spoil the looks of the car. Motor magazine tested the car against a Ferrari Daytona, declaring the E12 as the winner.
