= You Got What It Takes (album) =

Studio album by the Dave Clark Five
- Released: 26 June 1967
- Genres: Pop rock, beat, rock and roll
- Length: 22:32
- Labels: Epic; BN 26312 / LN 24312
- Producer: Dave Clark

The Dave Clark Five US chronology
| 5 by 5 (1967) | You Got What It Takes (1967) | Everybody Knows (1967) |

Singles from You Got What It Takes
- 1. "I've Got to Have a Reason" / "Good Time Woman" Released: 16 December 1966; 2. "You Got What It Takes" / "Doctor Rhythm" Released: 9 March 1967

You Got What It Takes is the eleventh US album by the British band the Dave Clark Five, released on 26 June 1967 by Epic Records. The album contained four successful songs, a cover of Marv Johnson's soul hit "You Got What It Takes", the hit single "I've Got to Have a Reason" written by the band's guitarist Lenny Davidson and the bubblegum "Tabatha Twitchit" written for the band by Les Reed and Barry Mason. The album also features the band's earlier UK top 30 hit "Thinking of You Baby". The LP reached the Billboard and Cashbox charts.

== Overview ==
The album was released at a time when the music world was experimenting with new genres, mainly in the realm of psychedelia. The Dave Clark Five ignored these trends and offered a collection of songs in their traditional style. They even included three-year-old 1964 UK hit "Thinking of You Baby", which had not yet been released in the US. They also included a remake of the older Fats Domino's rock and roll hit "Blueberry Hill". Still, the LP's cover art had a psychedelic feel, with the band members captured in the artistic concept of a broken mirror. The author of the collage was not identified on the cover; the photographs were taken by Bruce Fleming. The following year, the band used identical artwork for their UK album Everybody Knows.

== Release and reception ==
Professional ratings
Review scores
| Source | Rating |
|---|---|
| AllMusic | 3.5/5 stars |

The album was produced by Dave Clark. Most of the songs were written by members of the band. The horn section consisted of Stan Roderick, Bert Ezzard, and Eddie Blair. Most likely, studio drummer Bobby Graham was also involved in the recording. You Got What It Takes was released in both mono (BN 26312) and stereo (LN 24312) versions. The album reached position 149 in the Billboard magazine chart, but did better in the competing Cashbox chart, reaching number 77. The album was also released in New Zealand and in Canada (with different artwork). It was not released in the UK.

Billboard magazine wrote, "This consistent chart group has another sure-fire chart item in this rockin' disc." And alongside the hit singles, it highlighted the songs "Blueberry Hill" and "Let Me Be". Cashbox magazine wrote, "The sweet sound of success permeates the disk, and the set should soon gain a foothold on the charts."

In a retrospective review for AllMusic, Richie Unterberger wrote, "It did mark an improvement over their previous album, Five by Five, and was less formulaic, if hardly bold or startling."

== Track listing ==
Side one
| No. | Title | Writer(s) | Length |
|---|---|---|---|
| 1. | "You Got What It Takes" | Tyran Carlo, Gwen Fuqua, Berry Gordy Jr., Marv Johnson | 2:59 |
| 2. | "I've Got to Have a Reason" | Dave Clark, Lenny Davidson | 1:53 |
| 3. | "You Don't Play Me Around" | Dave Clark, Mike Smith | 2:19 |
| 4. | "Thinking of You Baby" | Dave Clark, Mike Smith | 2:33 |
| 5. | "Lovin' So Good" | Dave Clark, Lenny Davidson | 1:46 |

Side two
| No. | Title | Writer(s) | Length |
|---|---|---|---|
| 1. | "Doctor Rhythm" | Dave Clark, Mike Smith | 2:48 |
| 2. | "Play with Me" | Dave Clark, Lenny Davidson | 1:40 |
| 3. | "Let Me Be" | Dave Clark, Denis Payton | 1:44 |
| 4. | "Blueberry Hill" | Vincent Rose, Larry Stock, Al Lewis | 2:18 |
| 5. | "Tabatha Twitchit" | Barry Mason, Les Reed | 2:25 |

== Personnel ==
The Dave Clark Five

- Dave Clark – drums, backing vocals
- Mike Smith – keyboards, lead vocals
- Lenny Davidson – electric guitars, backing vocals
- Rick Huxley – bass guitar, backing vocals
- Denis Payton – tenor saxophone, backing vocals

Additional musician

- Stan Roderick, Bert Ezzard, Eddie Blair – horn section
- Bobby Graham – drums (session drummer, not stated on the record sleeve)

== Charts ==
| Chart (1967) | Peak position |
|---|---|
| US Billboard Top LP's | 149 |
| US Cash Box Top 100 Albums | 77 |
| US Record World 100 Top LP's | 71 |
