= Callow-la-vita =

1968 single by Raymond Froggatt

Single by Raymond Froggatt

from the album The Voice and Writing of Raymond Froggatt
- B-side: "Lost Autumn"
- Released: 19 April 1968
- Recorded: 1968
- Genre: Pop rock
- Length: 2:36
- Label: Polydor
- Songwriter(s): Raymond Froggatt
- Producer(s): Terry Kennedy

Raymond Froggatt singles chronology
"Callow-la-vita" (1968)	"Just a Little Bit of Love" (1968)

"Callow-la-vita" is a song by British singer-songwriter Raymond Froggatt recorded and released by his eponymous band as a debut single in April 1968. The record release was overlooked in the UK but was very successful in the Netherlands. The song became a success in the UK after being recorded by the Dave Clark Five, retitled as "The Red Balloon".

In an interview in 1972, Raymond Froggatt said that the song "becoming such a massive hit was one of the worst things that ever happened", as "people still haven't forgotten about it. Now when we play colleges the kids still think we'll be doing that kind of stuff". By 1972, the song had been recorded by sixteen different artists and sold over three million worldwide sales.

== Charts ==
Chart (1968)	Peak position
Belgium (Ultratop 50 Flanders)	7
Belgium (Ultratop 50 Wallonia)	34
Netherlands (Dutch Top 40)	3
Netherlands (Single Top 100)	2

== The Dave Clark Five version ==
"The Red Balloon"
- Cover of the single released in the US.

Single by the Dave Clark Five
- B-side: "Maze of Love"
- Released: 6 September 1968
- Recorded: 1968
- Studio: Lansdowne Studios, London
- Genre: Pop rock
- Length: 3:01
- Label: Columbia
- Songwriter(s): Raymond Froggatt
- Producer(s): Dave Clark

The Dave Clark Five singles chronology
"Please Stay" (1968)	"The Red Balloon" (1968)	"Live in the Sky" (1968)

The Dave Clark Five's version was released in September 1968 and became a top-ten hit in several territories, including the UK. It was included on the UK album 5 by 5, but was not included on any US album.

=== Background and release ===
Dave Clark first heard "Callow-la-vita" on the radio and several weeks later contacted the publishers asking if they expected anything to become of the song, to which they said no. He then said that he wanted to cover the song so long as he could change the title, some of the lyrics and have a different arrangement. The publishers agreed and the Dave Clark Five recorded the song as "The Red Balloon". Recorded at Lansdowne Studios, the band were joined by trumpet session musicians, and the brass and saxophone arrangements were done by Les Reed. The lead vocals were by Dave Clark, which was the only Dave Clark Five single to do so. They were intended to be by usual lead singer Mike Smith, but "he couldn’t get to grips with it". The song also includes a verse in French, which had to be written down phonetically as Clark didn't speak the language and he later said "I didn’t know what the hell I was singing about until Top Of The Pops put a translation on screen".

After the single's release, Polydor then re-released Raymond Froggatt's original version with the title "The Red Balloon".

=== Reception ===
Reviewing the Dave Clark Five version and the reissue of Raymond Froggatt's version for New Musical Express, Derek Johnson wrote that "it's an extremely catchy tune, with a lyrical, flowing quality and the Froggatt team treats it with a delicacy and piquancy ideally suited to the subject matter". Whereas, Johnson wrote that "Dave Clark's version is entirely different. He has reverted to his big-bash, drum-thumping style of "Glad All Over"", and that it is "easily the more commercial of the two and the more likely to achieve Chart status".

=== Personnel ===
- Dave Clark – lead vocals, drums
- Mike Smith – organ, backing vocals
- Lenny Davidson – guitar, backing vocals
- Rick Huxley – bass guitar, backing vocals
- Denis Payton – sousaphone
- Stan Roderick – trumpet
- Bert Ezard – trumpet
- Eddie Blair – trumpet

=== Charts ===
Chart (1968)	Peak position
Australia (Kent Music Report)	51
Austria (Ö3 Austria Top 40)	18
Denmark (Danmarks Radio)	6
Germany (GfK)	13
Ireland (IRMA)	8
New Zealand (Listener)	8
Rhodesia (Lyons Maid)	5
Singapore (Radio Singapore)	1
South Africa (Springbok Radio)	6
Sweden (Tio i Topp)	10
UK Melody Maker Pop 30	7
UK New Musical Express Top 30	6
UK Record Retailer Top 50	7

== Other cover versions ==
- In November 1968, French singer Marie Laforêt released a French-language cover of the song, titled "Que calor la vida", which peaked at number 2 in France and number 14 in the Walloon region of Belgium.
- In 1986, German group Saragossa Band released a cover of the song, titled "Red Balloon".
