= Jaguar E-Type =

Sports car manufactured by Jaguar Cars from 1961–1974

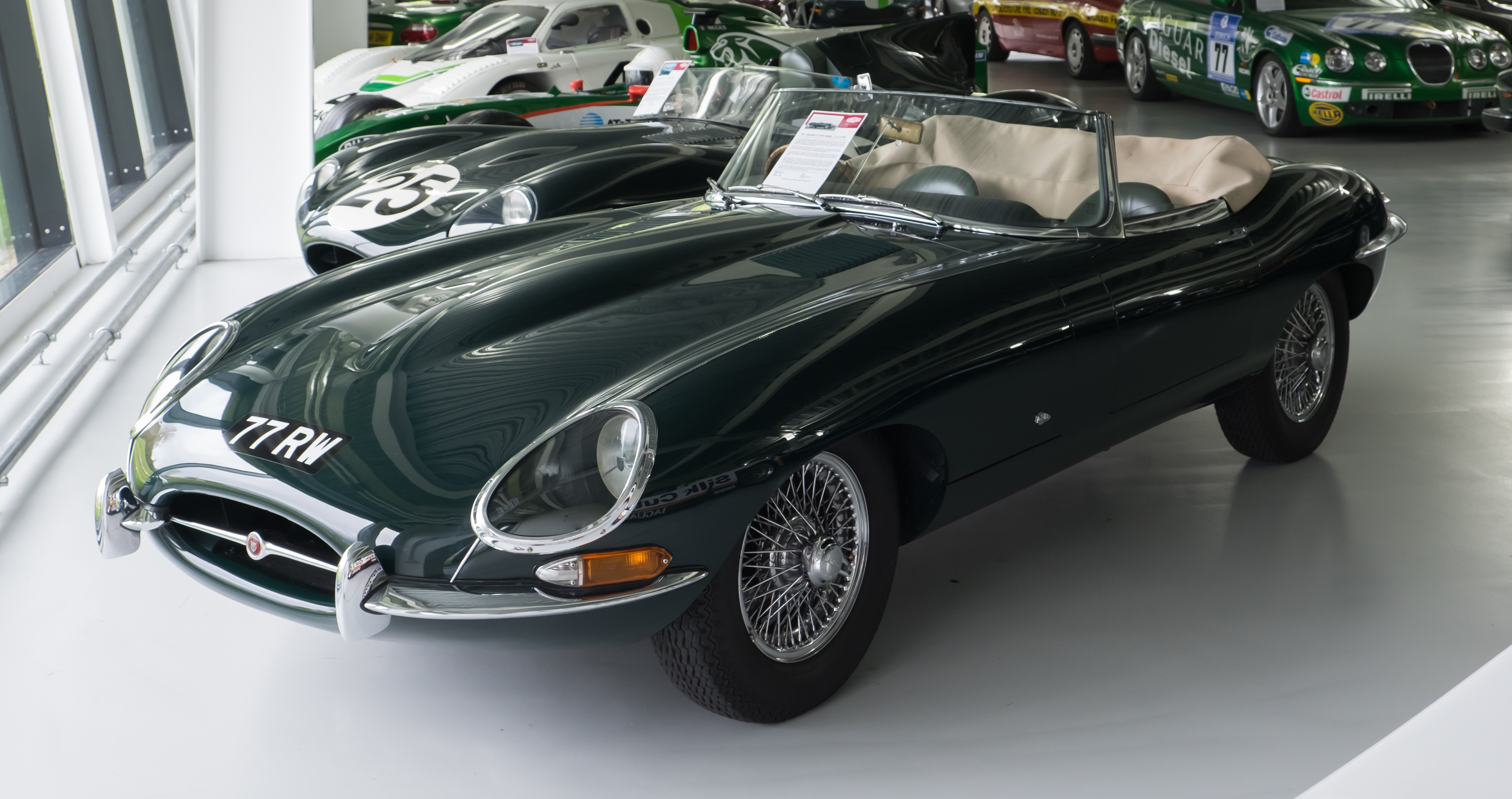
- 1961 E-Type Series 1 3.8-Litre, the first production model of this open two-seater

Overview
- Manufacturer: Jaguar Cars
- Also called: Jaguar XK-E (North America); Jaguar V-12
- Production: March 1961 – June 1974
- Assembly: United Kingdom: Coventry
- Designer: Malcolm Sayer

Body and chassis
- Class: Sports car
- Layout: FMR layout
- Related: Jaguar D-Type; Jaguar XJ13

Chronology
- Predecessor: Jaguar D-Type; Jaguar XK150; Jaguar XKSS
- Successor: Jaguar XJ-S

The Jaguar E-Type, or the Jaguar XK-E for the North American market, is a British front-engined sports car that was manufactured by Jaguar Cars Ltd from 1961 to 1974. Its sleek appearance, advanced technologies, high performance, and competitive pricing established it as an icon. The E-Type's claimed 150 miles per hour (240 km/h) top speed, sub-7-second 0 to 60 mph (97 km/h) acceleration, largely unitary body construction, front and rear independent suspension with disc brakes, mounted inboard at the rear, and rack-and-pinion steering spurred industry-wide changes.

The E-Type was based on Jaguar's D-Type racing car, which had won the 24 Hours of Le Mans for three consecutive years beginning in 1955.

The E-Type employed what was, for the early 1960s, a novel design principle, with a front subframe carrying the engine, front suspension and front bodywork bolted directly to the body tub. No ladder frame chassis, as was common at the time, was needed and as such the first cars weighed only 1,315 kg (2,899 lb).

It is rumored that, at its debut on 15 March 1961, Enzo Ferrari called it "the most beautiful car ever made", but this statement has not been fully confirmed. In 2004, Sports Car International magazine placed the E-Type at number one on their list of Top Sports Cars of the 1960s. In March 2008, the Jaguar E-Type ranked first in The Daily Telegraph's online list of the world's "100 most beautiful cars" of all time.

== Overview ==
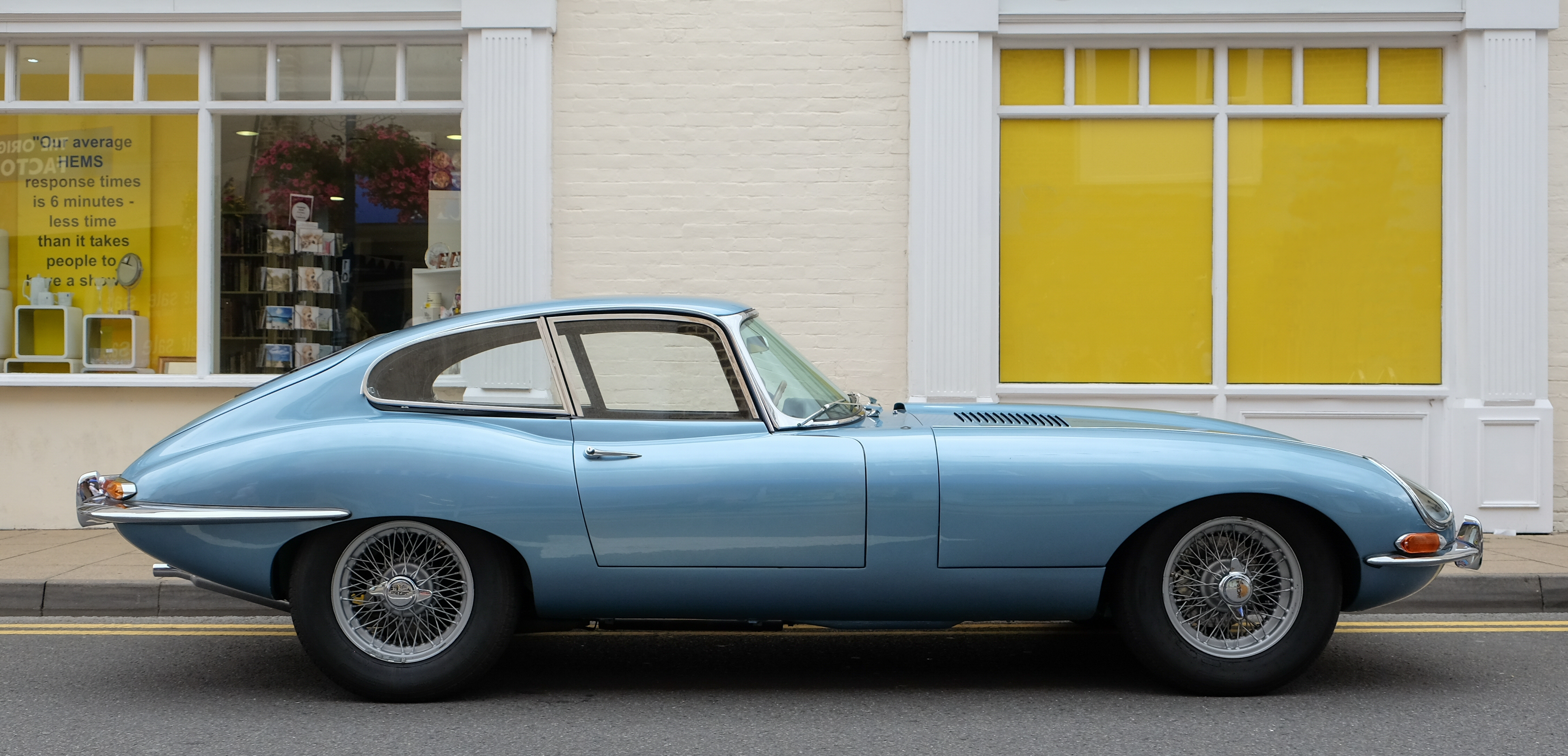
E-Type Series 1 coupé 1964

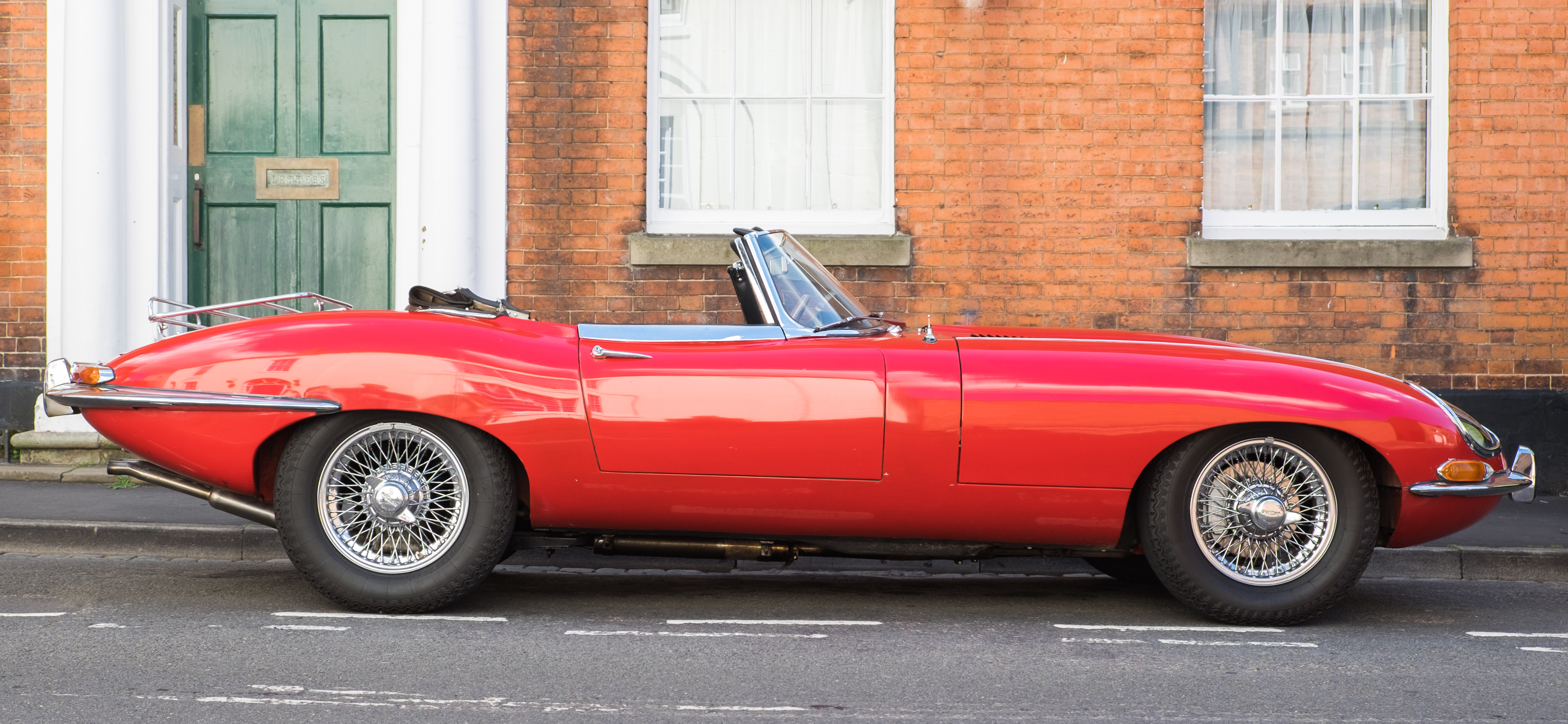
E-Type Series 1 OTS 1967

The E-Type was introduced as a rear-wheel drive grand tourer in two-seater coupé form (FHC or Fixed Head Coupé) and as a two-seater convertible (OTS or Open Two Seater). A "2+2" four-seater version of the coupé, with a lengthened wheelbase, was released in 1966.

Later model updates of the E-Type were officially designated "Series 2" and "Series 3", and over time the earlier cars have come to be referred to as "Series 1." As with other partly hand made cars of the time, changes were incremental and ongoing, which has led to confusion over exactly what a Series 1 car is. This is of more than academic interest, as Series 1 E-Types—and particularly Series 1 roadsters—often have values in excess of Series 2 and 3 models.

The Series 1 cars essentially fall into two categories: Those made between 1961 and 1964, which had 3.8-litre engines and (on all but the very last cars) partial synchromesh transmissions; and those made between 1965 and 1967, which increased engine size and torque by around 10% to 4.2 litres, and also provided new reclining seats, an alternator in place of the dynamo, an electrical system switched to negative earth, a more reliable brake servo, and other modern amenities. Styling was unchanged.

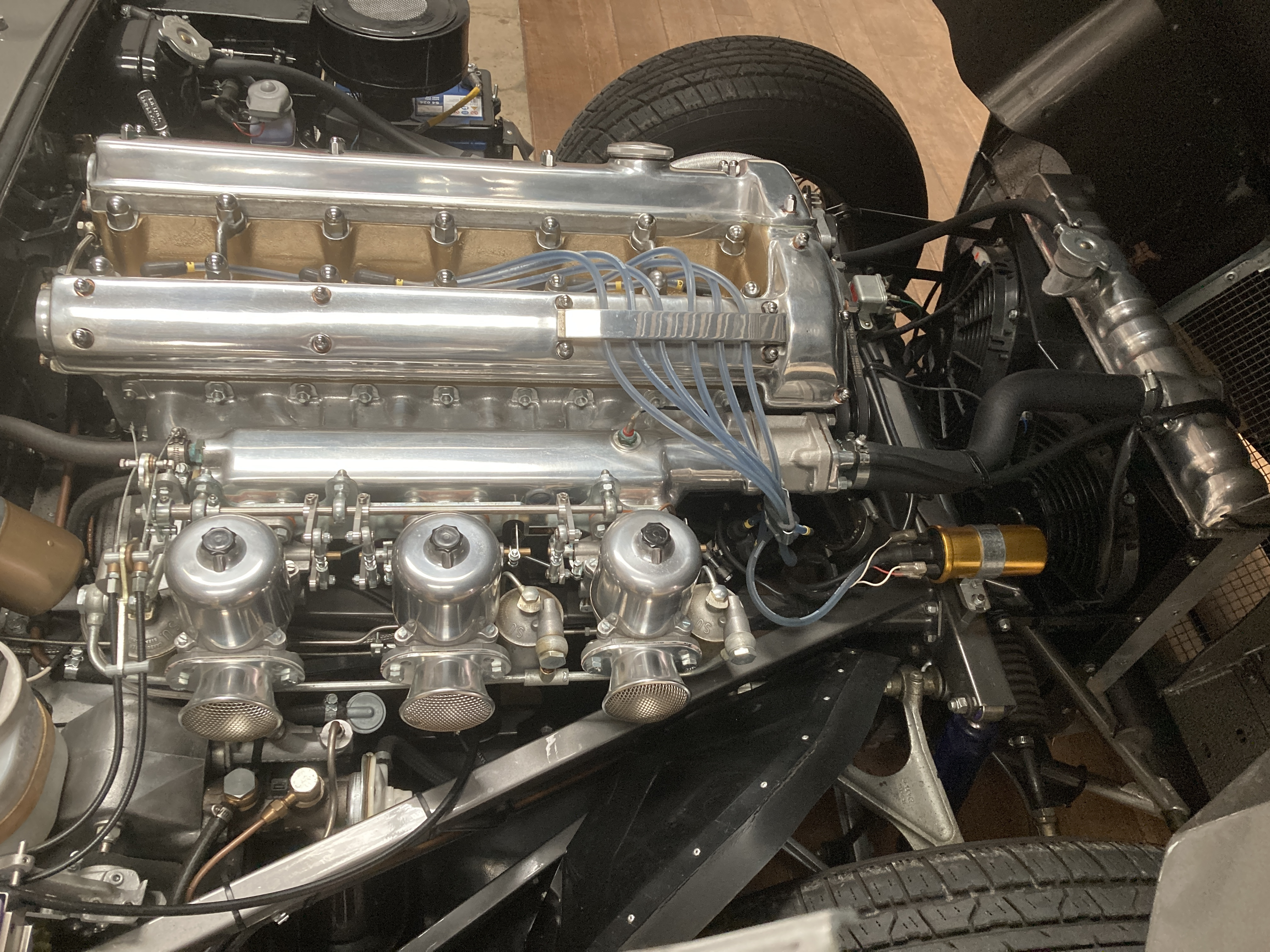
E-Type Jag 4.2-litre engine

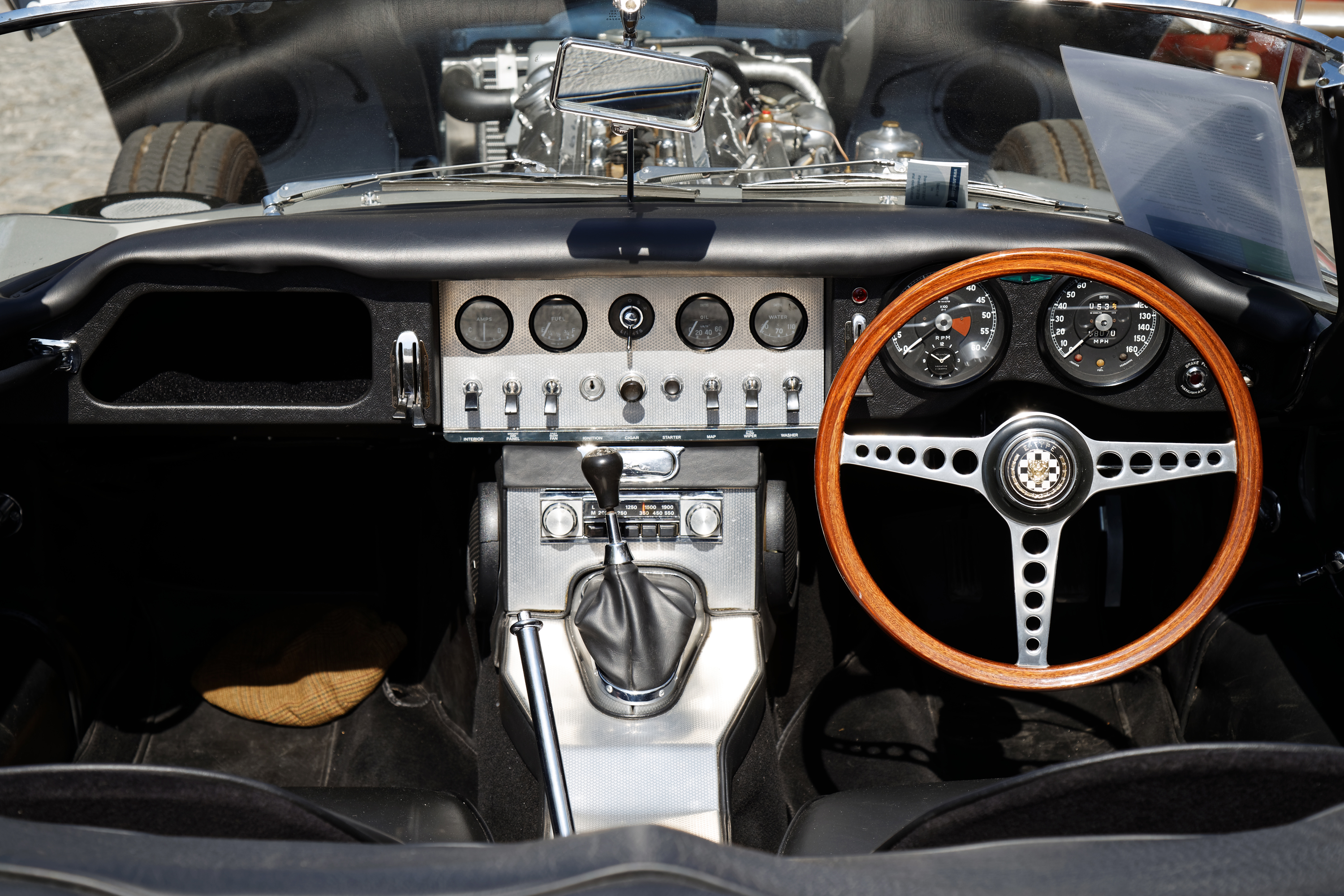
E-Type Series 1 roadster interior, 1962

As a result, the 4.2-litre Type 1 generally became the most valuable form of the car. However, as of the end of 2014, the most expensive regular production Jaguar E-Types sold at auction included a 4.2-litre Series 1 roadster, with matching numbers, original paint and interior, under 80,000 mi (130,000 km) since new, and a history of being in the original buyer's family for 45 years, for $467,000 in 2013, and a 3.8-litre 1961 "flat floor" (an early production variant with flat footwell floors, lacking later recessed panels) Series 1, for $528,000 in 2014. Special run racing lightweights go for far more still. For example, a 1963 E-type Lightweight Competition advertised as very original and with much patina (wearing the "factory installed interior and bodywork showing the patina of decades of use," although it was re-painted and has a non-matching numbers – albeit factory provided – engine), one of just twelve that were built, sold for $7,370,000 at the 2017 Scottsdale, Arizona auctions.

Being a British-made car of the 1960s, there are some rather rare sub-types of Series 1 E-Types, particularly at the beginning and end of the Series 1 production. For example, the first 500 Series 1 cars had flat floors and external bonnet latches. At the close of the Series 1 production run, there were a small number of cars produced that are identical in every respect to other Series 1 units (including triple SU carbs, button actuated starter, toggle switches, etc.), except that the headlight covers were removed for better illumination. It is not known exactly how many of these Series 1 cars (sometimes referred to as for convenience sake as "Series 1.25," but per Jaguar, Series 1) were produced, but given that 1,508 Series 1 convertibles were produced worldwide for 1967, combined with the fact that these examples were made in just the last several months of Series 1 production, means that these, like the flat floor examples that began the Series 1 production run, are the lowest volume Series 1 variant, save of course for the special lightweights.

Including both left and right hand drive examples, a total of 7,828 3.8-litre Series 1 open two seaters (OTS) were built, with 6,749 of the later 4.2-litre Series 1 OTS's having been manufactured.

While the 1968 Series 1.5 cars maintained the essential design of the Series 1 models, US emission regulations saw its triple SU carburettors replaced there with twin Zenith-Stromberg units, resulting in a drop in claimed power from 265 to 246 hp (198 to 183 kW) and torque from 283 to 263 lb⋅ft (384 to 357 N⋅m).

Of the "Series 1" cars, Jaguar manufactured some limited-edition variants, inspired by motor racing:

- The "'Lightweight' E-Type" initiated and designed for competition was intended as a racing follow-up to the D-Type. Jaguar planned to produce 18 units but ultimately only a dozen were reportedly built. Of those, two have been converted to low drag form and two others are known to have been crashed and deemed to be beyond repair, although one has now been rebuilt. These are exceedingly rare and sought after by collectors. *The "Low Drag Coupé" was a one-off technical exercise which was ultimately sold to a Jaguar racing driver. It is presently believed to be part of the private collection of the current Viscount Cowdray. In 2014, Jaguar announced its intention to build the remaining six lightweights, at a cost of approximately £1 million each.

Safety and emissions regulations in the North American market resulted in Series 2 and 3 E-Types being fitted with a larger grille, wider wheel arches, and bigger bumpers. And they were also fitted with a bigger radiator and cooling system because the Series 1 were notorious for overheating

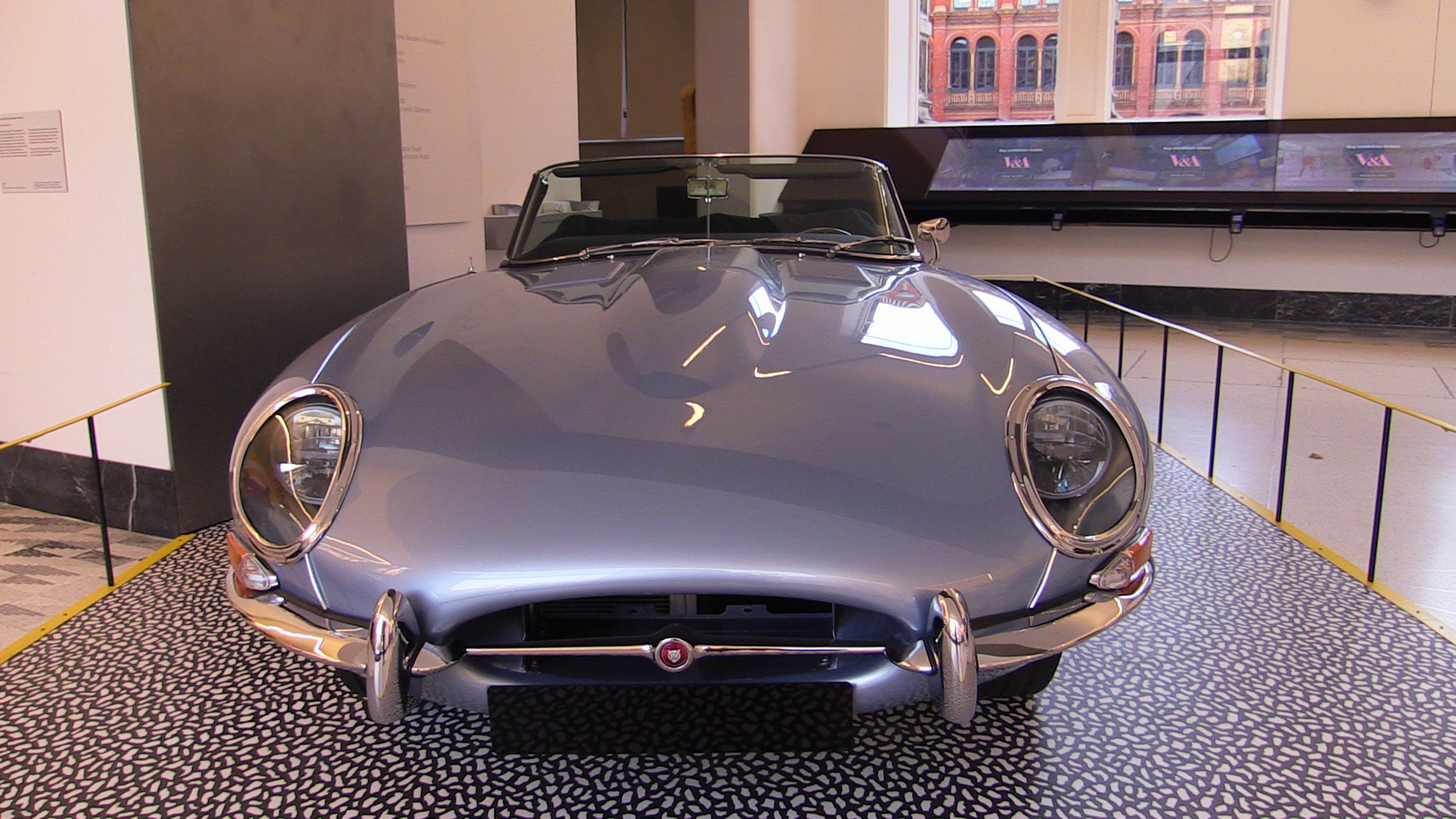
E-Type Series 1 OTS, V&A, London

The New York City Museum of Modern Art recognised the significance of the E-Type's design in 1996 by adding a blue roadster to its permanent design collection, one of only six automobiles to receive the distinction. The MoMA XKE is a Series 1 OTS. The Victoria and Albert Museum in London also has an example of the Series 1 OTS in its collection.

== Concept versions ==
=== E1A (1957) ===
After the company's success at the Le Mans 24 hr through the 1950s, Jaguar's racing department was given the brief to use D-Type style construction to build a road-going sports car to replace the XK150.

The first prototype (E1A), designed in 1957 by Technical Director and Chief Engineer William Heynes, featured a monocoque body with Jaguar's fully independent rear suspension and the XK engine. The car was used solely for factory testing and was never formally released to the public. The car was eventually scrapped by the factory.

=== E2A (1960) ===
Jaguar's second E-Type concept was E2A which, unlike the E1A, was constructed from a steel chassis with an aluminium body. This car was completed as a racing car as it was thought by Jaguar at the time it would provide a better testing ground. E2A used a 3-litre version of the XK engine with a Lucas fuel injection system.

After retiring from the Le Mans 24 hr the car was shipped to America to be used for racing by Jaguar privateer Briggs Cunningham. In 1961, the car returned to Jaguar in England to be used as a test vehicle. Ownership of E2A passed in 1970 to Roger Woodley (Jaguar's customer competition car manager) who took possession on the basis the car not be used for racing. E2A had been possibly scheduled to be scrapped. Roger's wife owned E2A until 2008 when it was offered for sale at Bonham's Quail Auction, where it sold for US$4,957,000.

=== E-Type Concept Zero (2017) ===
Jaguar unveiled a modern revival of the 1968 E-Type series 1.5 roadster with an all-electric, zero-emission powertrain in September 2017. The vehicle has a 40 kWh battery-powered electric motor and can accelerate to 60 mph in 5.5 seconds. On a full charge, the vehicle has a range of 168 miles (270 km). The battery pack is designed to fit in the space occupied by the original six-cylinder motor without any modifications, and will fit in any model Jaguar using the same motor. The electric motor replaces the original transmission.

In August 2018, Jaguar confirmed it would offer all-electric E-Types for sale starting in summer 2020. However, this plan was halted in 2019.

== Production versions ==
=== Series 1 (1961–1968) ===
Series 1
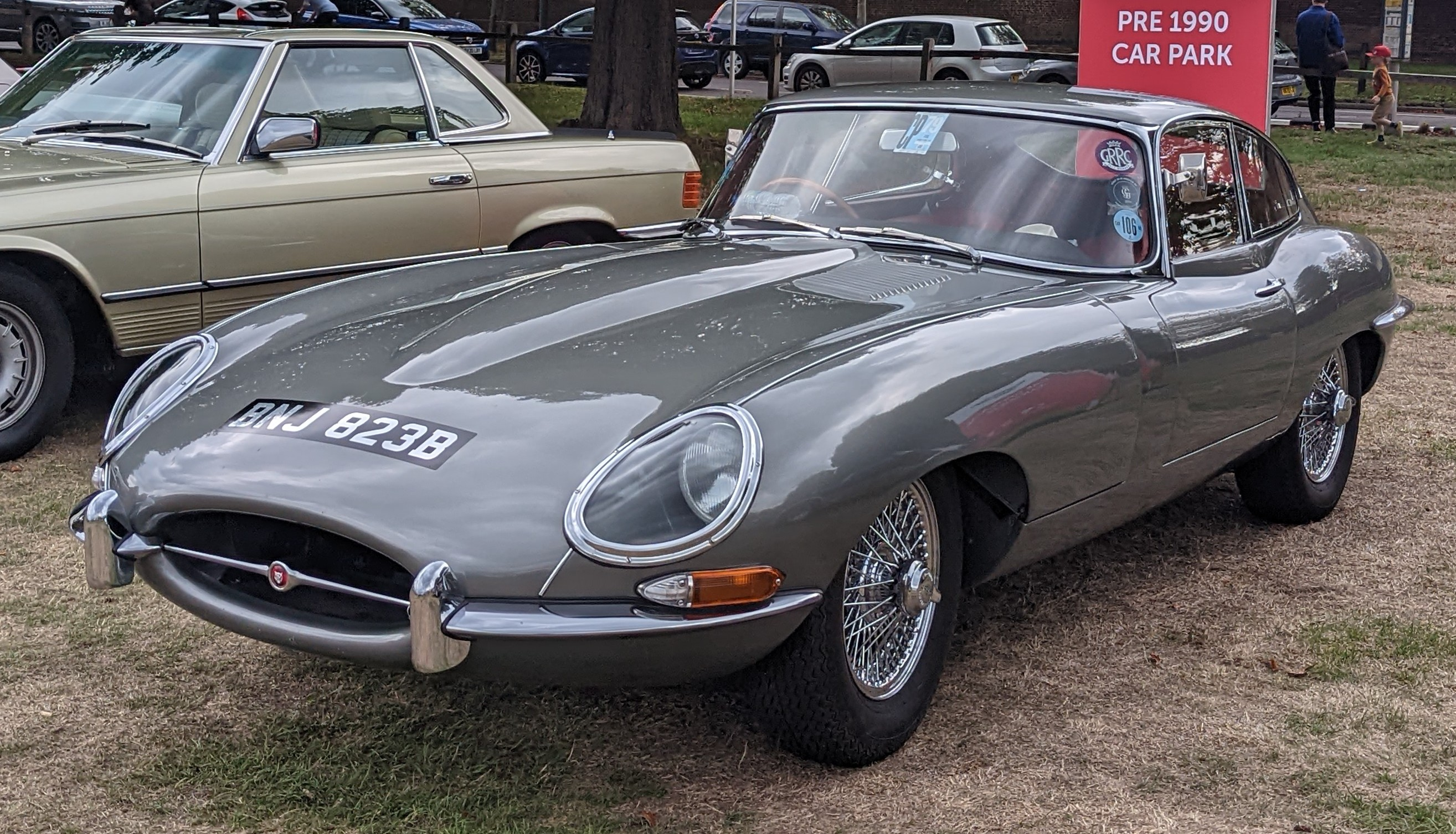
- Jaguar E-Type Series 1 coupé

Overview
- Also called: Jaguar XK-E
- Production: March 1961–1968

Body and chassis
- Body style: 2-door fastback coupé 2-door 2+2 fastback coupé 2-door roadster

Powertrain
- Engine: 3.8 L XK I6; 4.2 L XK I6
- Transmission: 4-speed manual 3-speed automatic (1966-onward, 2+2 model only)

Dimensions
- Wheelbase: 96.0 in (2,438 mm) (FHC / OTS); 105.0 in (2,667 mm) (2+2)
- Length: 175.3125 in (4,453 mm) (FHC / OTS); 184.4375 in (4,685 mm) (2+2)
- Width: 65.25 in (1,657 mm) (all)
- Height: 48.125 in (1,222 mm) (FHC); 50.125 in (1,273 mm) (2+2); 46.5 in (1,181 mm) (OTS)
- Kerb weight: 2,900 lb (1,315 kg) (FHC); 2,770 lb (1,256 kg) (OTS); 3,090 lb (1,402 kg) (2+2)

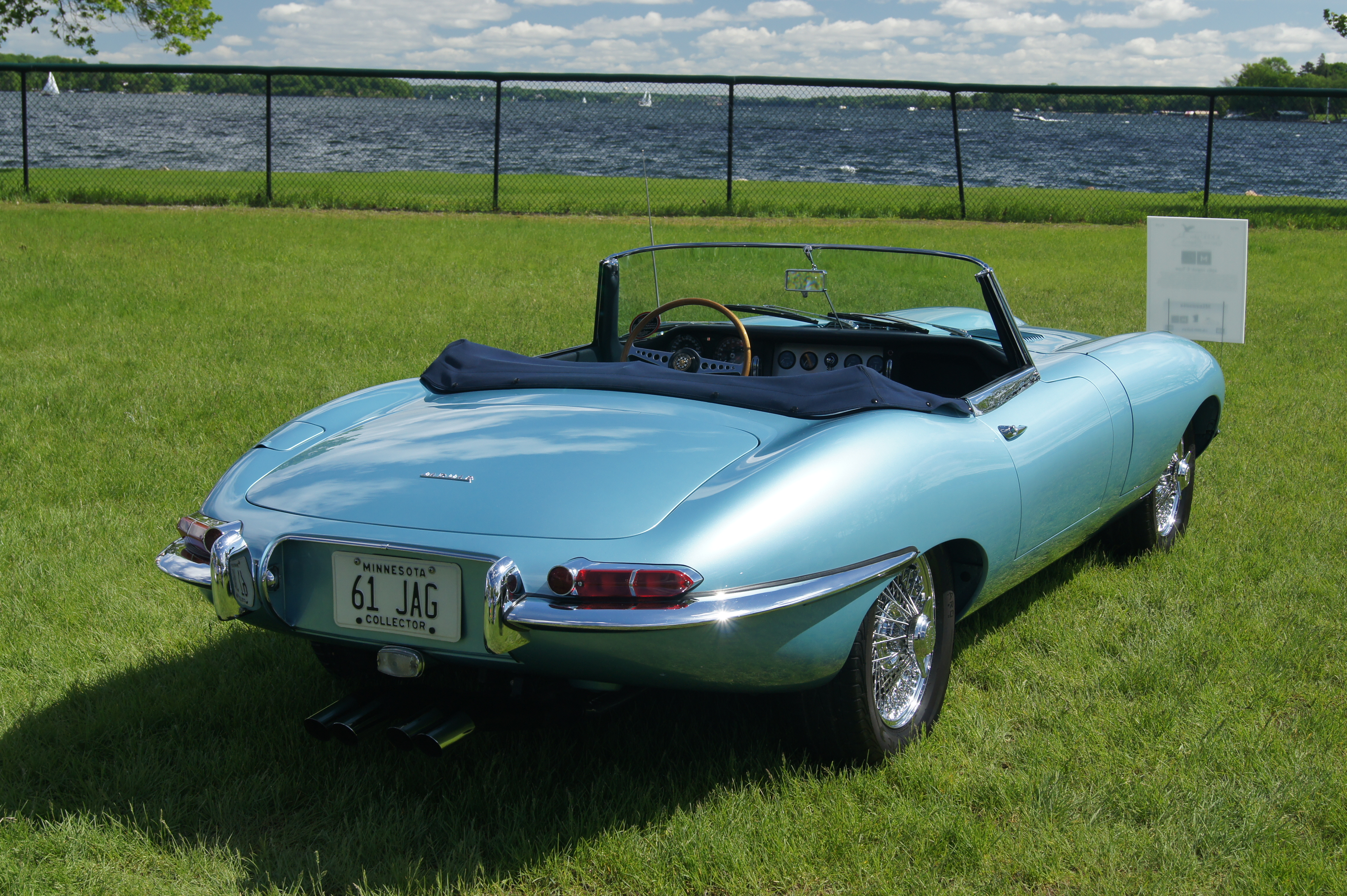
E-Type roadster (Series I)

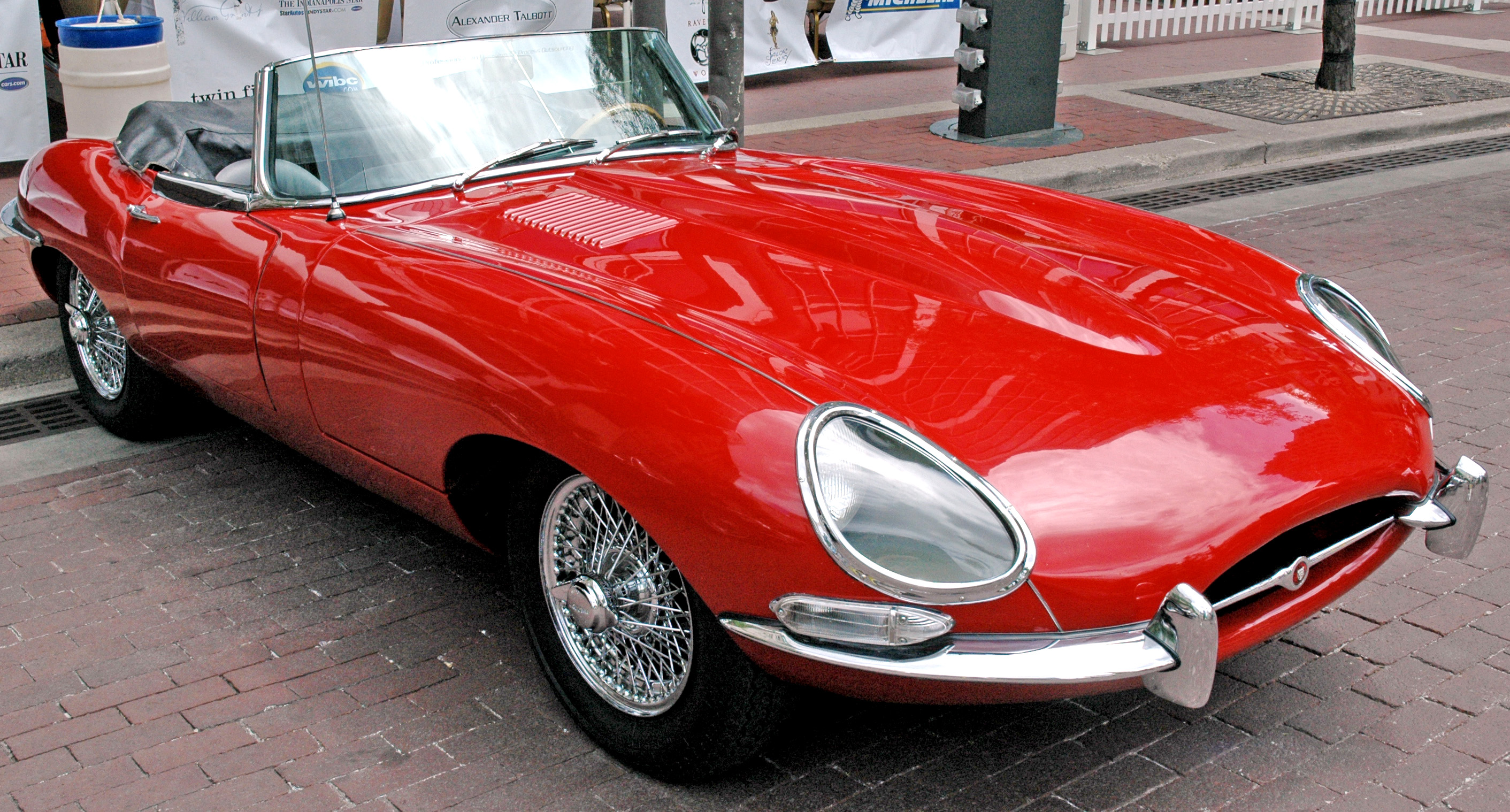
1963 E-Type Roadster

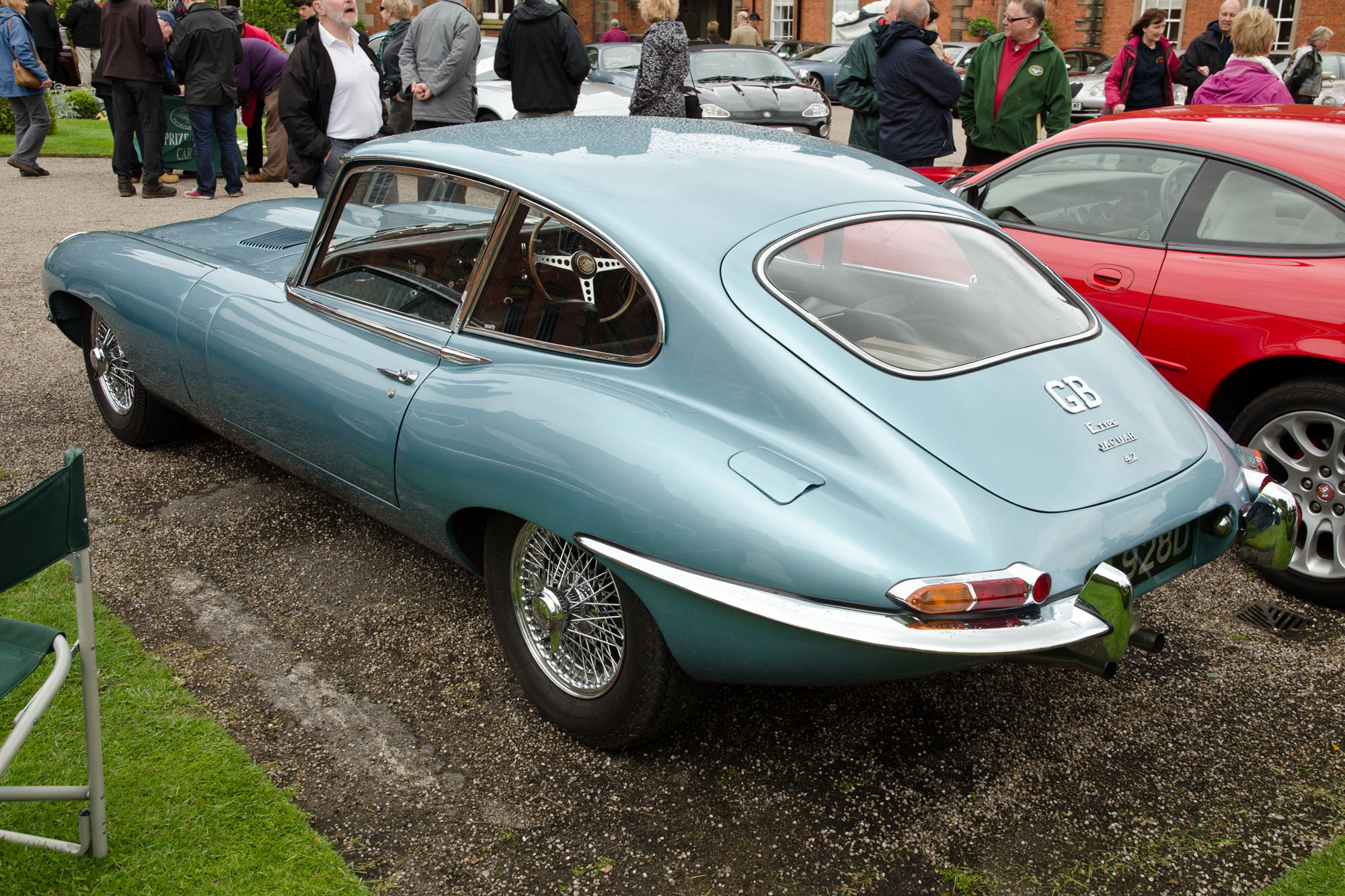
1966 E-Type 2+2 coupé

The Series 1 was introduced in March 1961, initially for export only. The domestic market launch came four months later, in July 1961. The cars at this time used the triple SU carburetted 3.8-litre six-cylinder Jaguar XK engine from the XK150S. Earlier cars utilised external bonnet latches that required a tool to open and had a flat floor design. These cars are rare and more valuable. After that, the floors were dished to provide more legroom, and the twin bonnet latches moved inside the car. The 3.8-litre engine was increased to 4.2 litres (4,235 cc) in October 1964.

The 4.2-litre engine produced the same power as the 3.8-litre (265 bhp; 198 kW) and same top speed (150 mph; 241 km/h), but increased torque 18% from 240 to 283 lb⋅ft (325 to 384 N⋅m). Acceleration remained pretty much the same, and 0 to 60 mph (0 to 97 km/h) times were around 6.4 seconds for both engines, but maximum power was now reached at 5,400 rpm instead of 5,500 rpm on the 3.8-litre. That all meant better throttle response for drivers that did not want to shift down gears. The 4.2-litre's block was completely redesigned, made longer to accommodate 5 mm (0.20 in) larger bores, and the crankshaft modified to use newer bearings. Other engine upgrades included a new alternator/generator and an electric cooling fan for the radiator.

Autocar road tested a UK spec E-Type 4.2 fixed head coupé in May 1965. The maximum speed was 153 mph (246 km/h), the 0–60 mph (0–97 km/h) time was 7.6 seconds and the 1/4 mile (402 m) from a standing start took 15.1 seconds. They summarised it as "In its 4.2 guise the E-Type is a fast car (the fastest we have ever tested) and offers just about the easiest way to travel quickly by road.".

Motor magazine road tested a UK spec E-Type 4.2 fixed head coupé in Oct 1964. The maximum speed was 150 mph (241 km/h), the 0-60 mph (97 km/h) time was 7 seconds and the 1/4 mile (402 m) time was 14.9 seconds. They summarised it as "The new 4.2 supersedes the early 3.8 as the fastest car Motor has tested. The absurd ease which 100 mph (161 km/h) can be exceeded in a 1/4 mile (402 m) never failed to astonish. 3,000 miles (4,828 km) of testing confirms that this is still one of the world's outstanding cars".

All E-Types featured independent coil-spring rear suspension, designed and developed by R J Knight, with torsion-bar front ends, and four-wheel disc brakes, inboard at the rear; all were power-assisted. The Coventry engineers spared no expense in high automotive braking technology. Like several British car builders of the middle and late 1950s, Austin-Healey and MG also used four-wheel disc brakes in that era, putting the British far ahead of Ferrari, Maserati, Alfa Romeo, Porsche, and Mercedes-Benz. Even Lanchester tried an abortive attempt to use copper disc brakes in 1902. Jaguar was one of the first vehicle manufacturers to equip production cars with 4 wheel disc brakes as standard from the XK150 in 1958. The Series 1 (except for late 1967 models) can be recognised by glass-covered headlights (up to 1967), a small "mouth" opening at the front, signal lights and tail-lights above bumpers and exhaust tips under the number plate in the rear.

3.8-litre cars have leather-upholstered bucket seats, an aluminium-trimmed centre instrument panel and console (changed to vinyl and leather in 1963), and a Moss four-speed gearbox that lacks synchromesh for first gear on all except very last cars. 4.2-litre cars have more comfortable seats, improved brakes and electrical systems, and an all-synchromesh Jaguar designed four-speed gearbox. 4.2-litre cars also have a badge on the boot proclaiming "Jaguar 4.2 Litre E-Type" (3.8 cars have a simple "Jaguar" badge). Optional extras included chrome spoked wheels and a detachable hard top for the OTS. When leaving the factory the car was originally fitted with Dunlop 6.40 × 15-inch RS5 tyres on 15 × 5K wire wheels (with the rear fitting 15 × 5K½ wheels supplied with 6.50 X15 Dunlop Racing R5 tyres in mind of competition). Later Series One cars were fitted with Dunlop 185 – 15 SP41 or 185 VR 15 Pirelli Cinturato as radial ply tyres.

A 2+2 version of the fastback coupé was added in 1966. The 2+2 offered the option of an automatic transmission. The body is 9 in (229 mm) longer and the roof angles are different. The roadster and the non 2+2 FHC (Fixed Head Coupé) remained as two-seaters.

Less widely known, right at the end of Series 1 production, but prior to the transitional "Series 1½" referred to below, a small number of Series 1 cars were produced with open headlights. These Series 1 cars had their headlights modified by removing the covers and altering the scoops they sit in, but these Series 1 headlights differ in several respects from those later used in the Series 1½ (or 1.5), the main being they are shorter at 143 mm from the Series 1½ at 160 mm. Production dates on these machines vary but in right-hand drive form production has been verified as late as July 1968. They are not "rare" in the sense of the build of the twelve lightweights, but they are certainly uncommon; they were not produced until January 1967 and given the foregoing information that they were produced as late as July 1968, it appears that there must have been an overlap with the Series 1.5 production, which began in August 1967 as model year 1968 models. These calendar year/model year Series 1 E-Types are identical to other 4.2-litre Series 1 examples in every respect except for the open headlights; all other component areas, including the exterior, the interior, and the engine compartment are the same, with the same three SU carburettors, polished aluminium cam covers, centre dash toggle switches, etc.

Following the Series 1 there was a transitional series of cars built in 1967–68 as model year 1968 cars, unofficially called "Series 1½." Due to American pressure the new features were not just open headlights, but also different switches (black rocker switches as opposed to the Series 1 toggle switches), de-tuning for emissions (using two Zenith-Stromberg carburettors instead of the original three SUs) for US models, ribbed cam covers painted black except for the top brushed aluminium ribbing, bonnet frames on the OTS that have two bows, and other changes. Series 1½ cars also have twin cooling fans and adjustable seat backs. The biggest change between 1961 and 1967 Series 1 E-Types and the 1968 Series 1.5 was the reduction in the number of carburettors from 3 to just 2 (North America), resulting in a loss in horsepower.

Series 2 features were gradually introduced into the Series 1, creating the unofficial Series 1½ cars, but always with the Series 1 body style. A United States federal safety law affecting 1968 model year cars sold in the US was the reason for the lack of headlight covers and change in dash switch design in the "Series 1.5" of 1968. An often overlooked change, one that is often "modified back" to the older style, is the wheel knock-off "nut." US safety law for 1968 models also forbade the winged-spinner knockoff, and any 1968 model year sold in the US (or earlier German delivery cars) should have a hexagonal knockoff nut, to be hammered on and off with the assistance of a special "socket" included with the car from the factory. This hexagonal nut carried on into the later Series 2 and 3. The engine configuration of the US Series 1.5s was the same as is found in the Series 2.

An open 3.8-litre car, actually the first such production car to be completed, was tested by the British magazine Motor in 1961 and had a top speed of 149.1 mph (240.0 km/h) and could accelerate from 0 to 60 mph (0 to 97 km/h) in 7.1 seconds. A fuel consumption of 21.3 miles per imperial gallon (13.3 L/100 km; 17.7 mpg_{‑US}) was recorded. The test car cost £2,097 including taxes.

The cars submitted for road test by the motoring journals of the time (1961) such as Motor, Autocar and Autosport magazines were prepared by the Jaguar works. This work entailed engine balancing and subtle tuning work such as gas-flowing checking the cylinder heads but otherwise production built engines.

Both of the well-known 1961 road test cars: the E-Type coupé Reg. No. 9600 HP and E-Type Convertible Reg. No. 77 RW, were fitted with Dunlop Racing Tyres on test, which had a larger rolling diameter and lower drag coefficient. This goes some way to explaining the 150 mph (240 km/h) maximum speeds that were obtained under ideal test conditions. The maximum safe rev limit for standard 6-cylinder 3.8-litre E-Type engines is 5,500 rpm. The later 4.2-Litre units had a red marking on the rev counter from just 5,000 rpm. Both 3.8 test cars may have approached 6,000 rpm in top gear when on road test, depending on final drive ratio.

Production numbers from Robson:

- 15,490 3.8s
- 17,320 4.2s
- 10,930 2+2s

Production numbers:

	FHC	OTS	2+2	Total
S1 3.8	7,670	7,828	0	15,498
S1 4.2	5,830	6,749	3,616	16,195
S1.5	1,942	2,801	1,983	6,726
Total	15,442	17,378	5,599	38,419

=== Series 2 (1968–1971) ===
Series 2
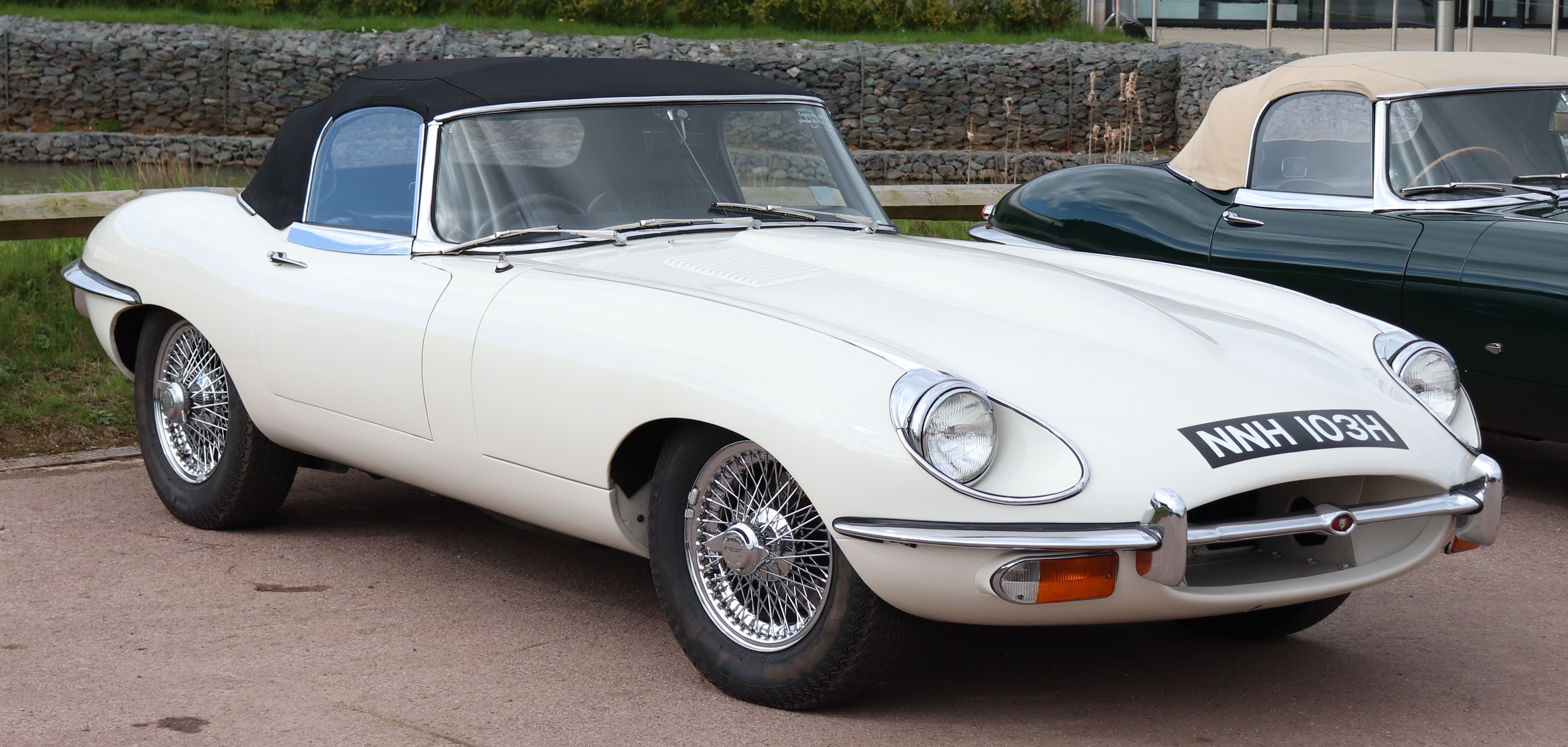
- Jaguar E-Type Series 2 roadster

Overview
- Also called: Jaguar XK-E
- Production: 1968–1971

Body and chassis
- Body style: 2-door fastback coupé 2-door 2+2 fastback coupé 2-door roadster

Powertrain
- Engine: 4.2 L XK I6

Dimensions
- Kerb weight: 3,018 lb (1,369 kg) (FHC); 2,750 lb (1,247 kg) (OTS); 3,090 lb (1,402 kg) (2+2)

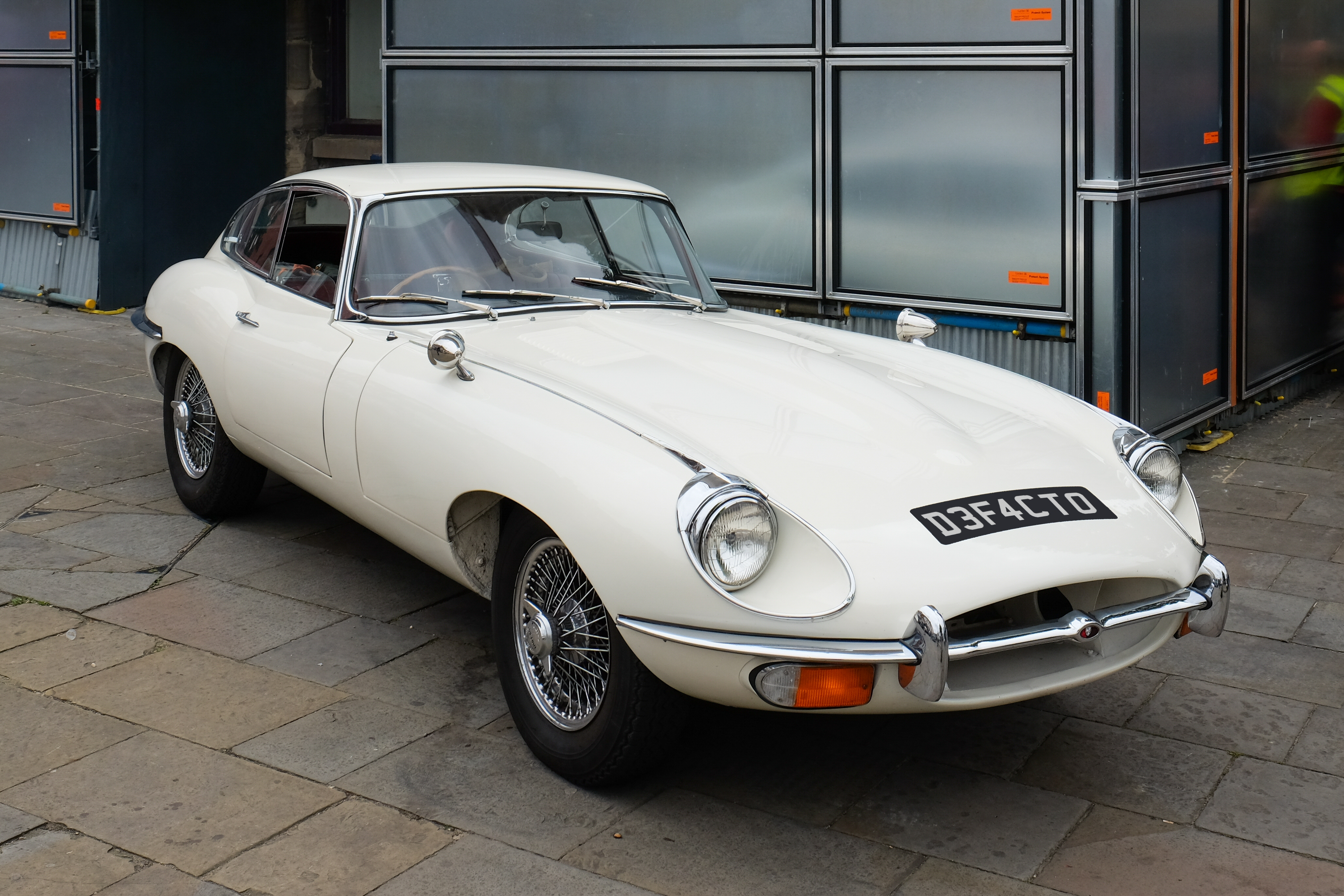
1968 Series 2 coupé

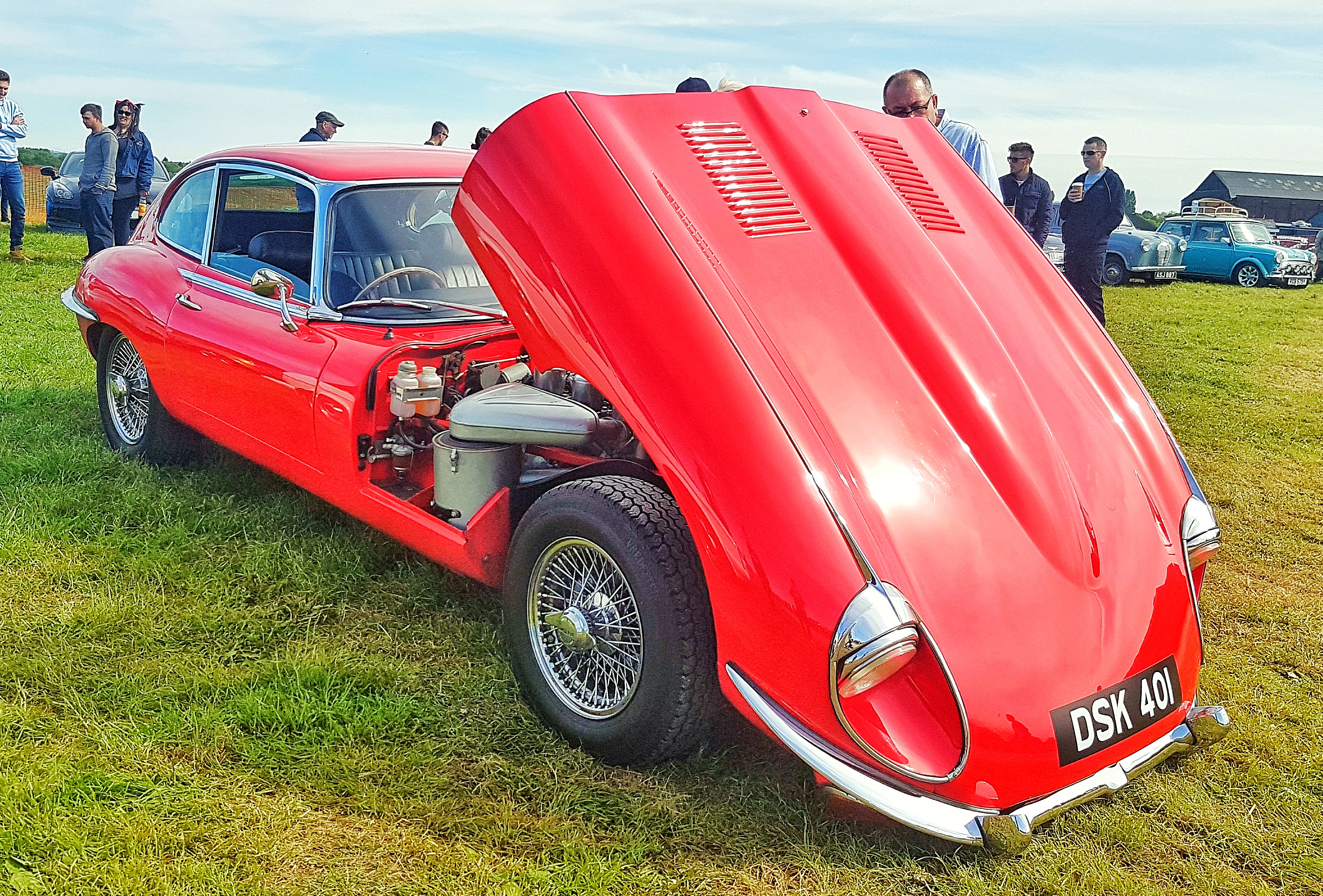
The E-Type's distinctive front-opening bonnet never changed during its production run

The Series 2 introduced a number of design changes, largely due to US National Highway Traffic and Safety Administration mandates. The most distinctive exterior feature is the absence of the glass headlight covers, which affected several other imported cars, such as the Citroën DS, as well. Unlike other cars, this step was applied worldwide for the E-Type.

Other hallmarks of Series 2 cars are a wrap-around rear bumper, larger front indicators and tail lights re-positioned below the bumpers, and an enlarged grille and twin electric fans to aid cooling.

Additional US-inspired changes included a steering lock which moved the ignition switch to the steering column, replacing the dashboard mounted ignition and push button starter, the symmetrical array of metal toggle switches replaced with plastic rockers, and a collapsible steering column to absorb impact in the event of an accident. New seats allowed the fitment of head restraints, as required by US law beginning in 1969.

The engine is easily identified visually by the change from smooth polished cam covers to a more industrial "ribbed" appearance. It was de-tuned in the US with twin two-barrel Strombergs replacing three SUs. Combined with larger valve clearances horsepower was reduced from 265 to 246 and torque from 283 to 263.

Air conditioning and power steering were available as factory options.

Production according to Robson is 13,490 of all types.

Series 2 production numbers:

	FHC	OTS	2+2	TOTAL
S2	4,855	8,628	5,326	18,809

Official delivery numbers by market and year are listed in Porter but no summary totals are given.

=== Series 3 (1971–1974) ===
Series 3
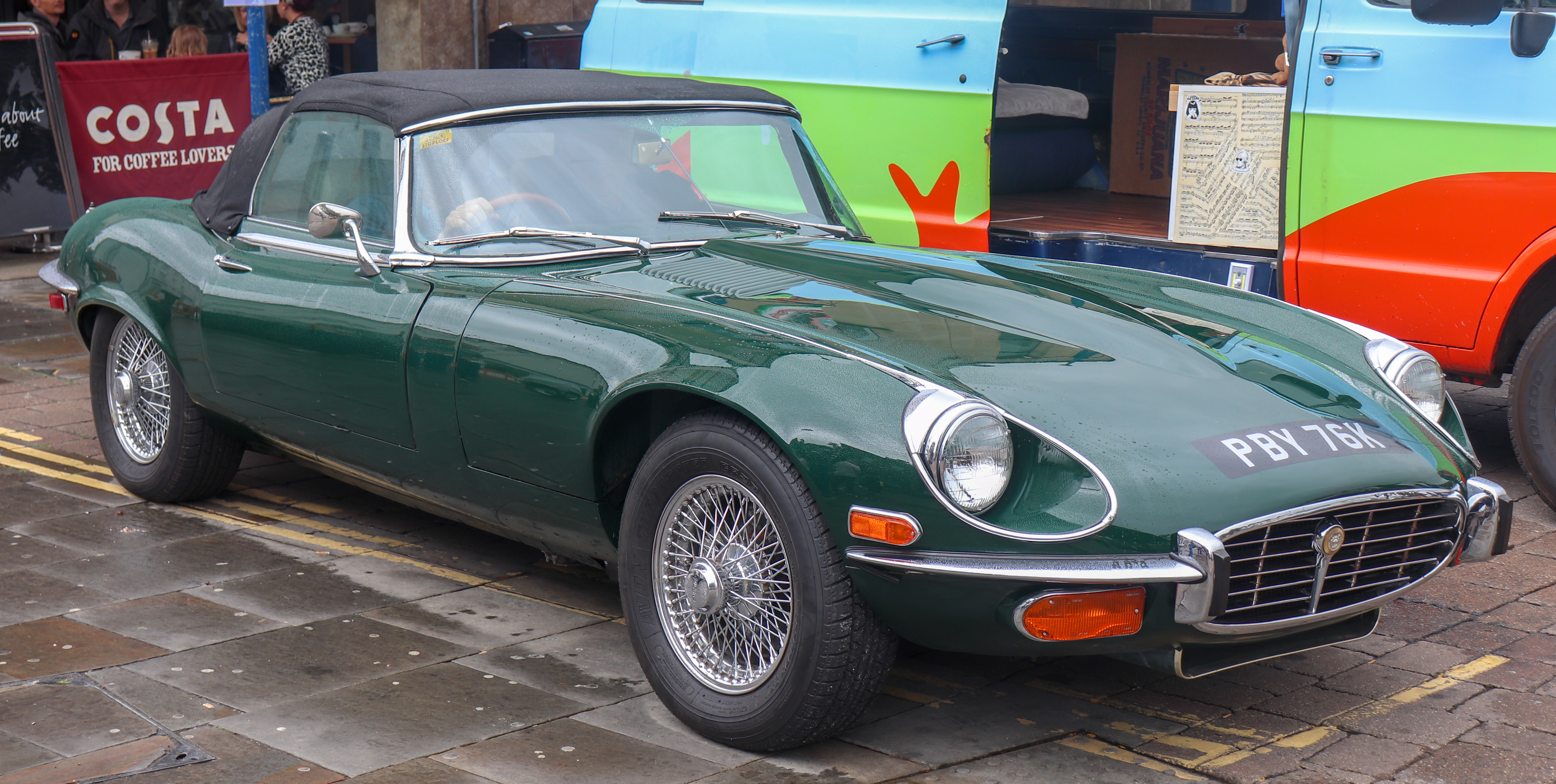
- Jaguar E-Type Series 3 roadster

Overview
- Also called: Jaguar V-12
- Production: 1971–1974

Body and chassis
- Body style: 2-door 2+2 coupé 2-door roadster
- Related: Guyson E12

Powertrain
- Engine: 5.3 L Jaguar V12 engine

Dimensions
- Wheelbase: 105 in (2,667 mm)
- Length: 184.4 in (4,684 mm) (2+2); 184.5 in (4,686 mm) (OTS)
- Width: 66.0 in (1,676 mm) (2+2); 66.1 in (1,679 mm) (OTS)
- Height: 48.9 in (1,242 mm) (2+2); 48.1 in (1,222 mm) (OTS)
- Kerb weight: 3,361 lb (1,525 kg) (2+2); 3,380 lb (1,533 kg) (OTS)

The E-Type Series 3 was introduced in 1971, with a new 5.3 L Jaguar V12 engine, uprated brakes and standard power steering. An automatic transmission, wire wheels and air conditioning were available options. The V12 was equipped with four Zenith carburettors, and as introduced produced a claimed 203 kW (272 hp), more torque, and a 0–60 mph acceleration of less than seven seconds. The short wheelbase FHC body style was discontinued, with the Series 3 available only as a convertible and 2+2 coupé. Fifty Series 3 E-Types were constructed as end of model commemorative cars. They featured black exteriors, cinnamon upholstery and commemorative plaques on the glove box (apart from a single green car that Jaguar painted for a long-standing customer). The final production E-Type OTS Roadster was built in June 1974.

The new longer wheelbase offered significantly more room in all directions. The Series 3 is easily identifiable by the large cross-slatted front grille, flared wheel arches, wider tyres, four exhaust tips and a badge on the rear that proclaims it to be a V12. The first published road test of the series 3 was in Jaguar Driver, the club magazine of the Jaguar Drivers' Club, the only owners club to be officially sanctioned by Sir William Lyons and Jaguar themselves. The road test of a car provided by Jaguar was published ahead of all the national and international magazines.

Cars for the US market were fitted with large projecting rubber bumper over-riders (in 1973 these were on front, in 1974 both front and rear) to meet local 5 mph (8 km/h) impact regulations, but those on European models were considerably smaller. US models also have side indicator repeats on the front wings. There were also a very limited number of six-cylinder Series 3 E-Types built. These were featured in the initial sales procedure but the lack of demand stopped their production. The V12 Open Two Seater and V12 2+2 were factory fitted with Dunlop E70VR − 15-inch tyres on 15 × 6K wire or solid wheels.

Robson lists production at 15,290.

Series 3 production numbers:

	FHC	OTS	2+2	TOTAL
S3	0	7,990	7,297	15,287

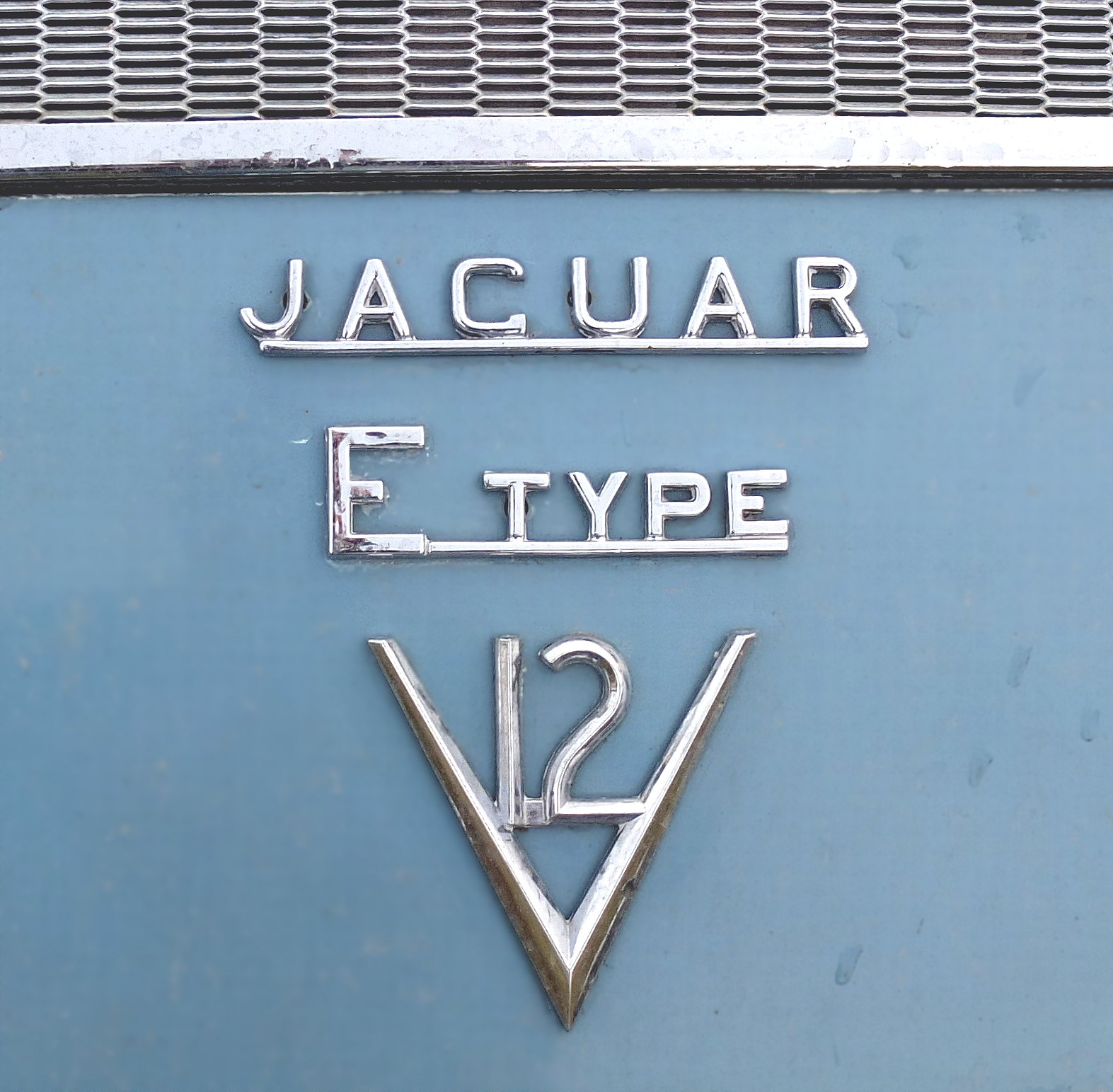
Logo of a 1972 Series 3

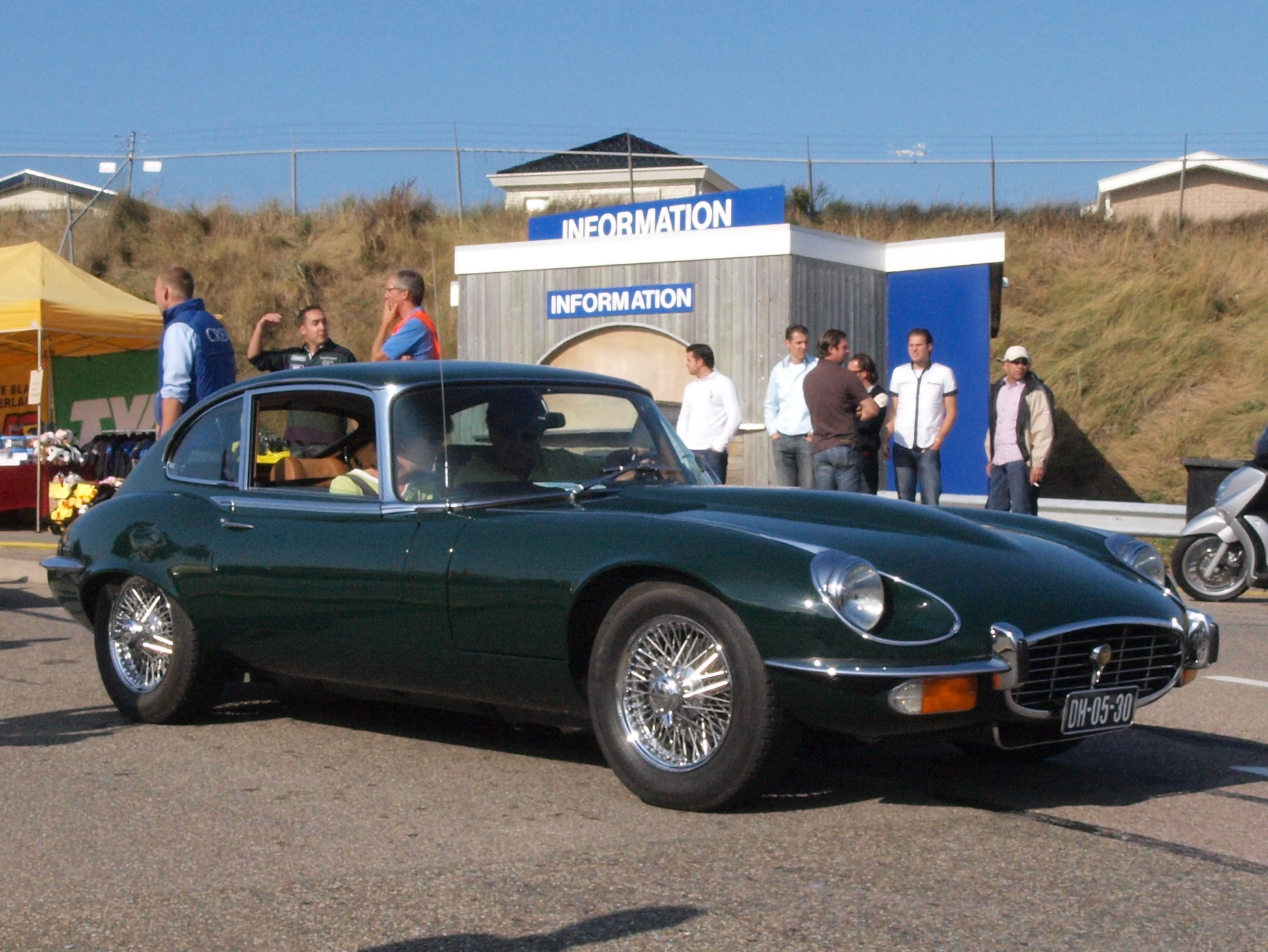
Jaguar E-Type Series 3 2+2

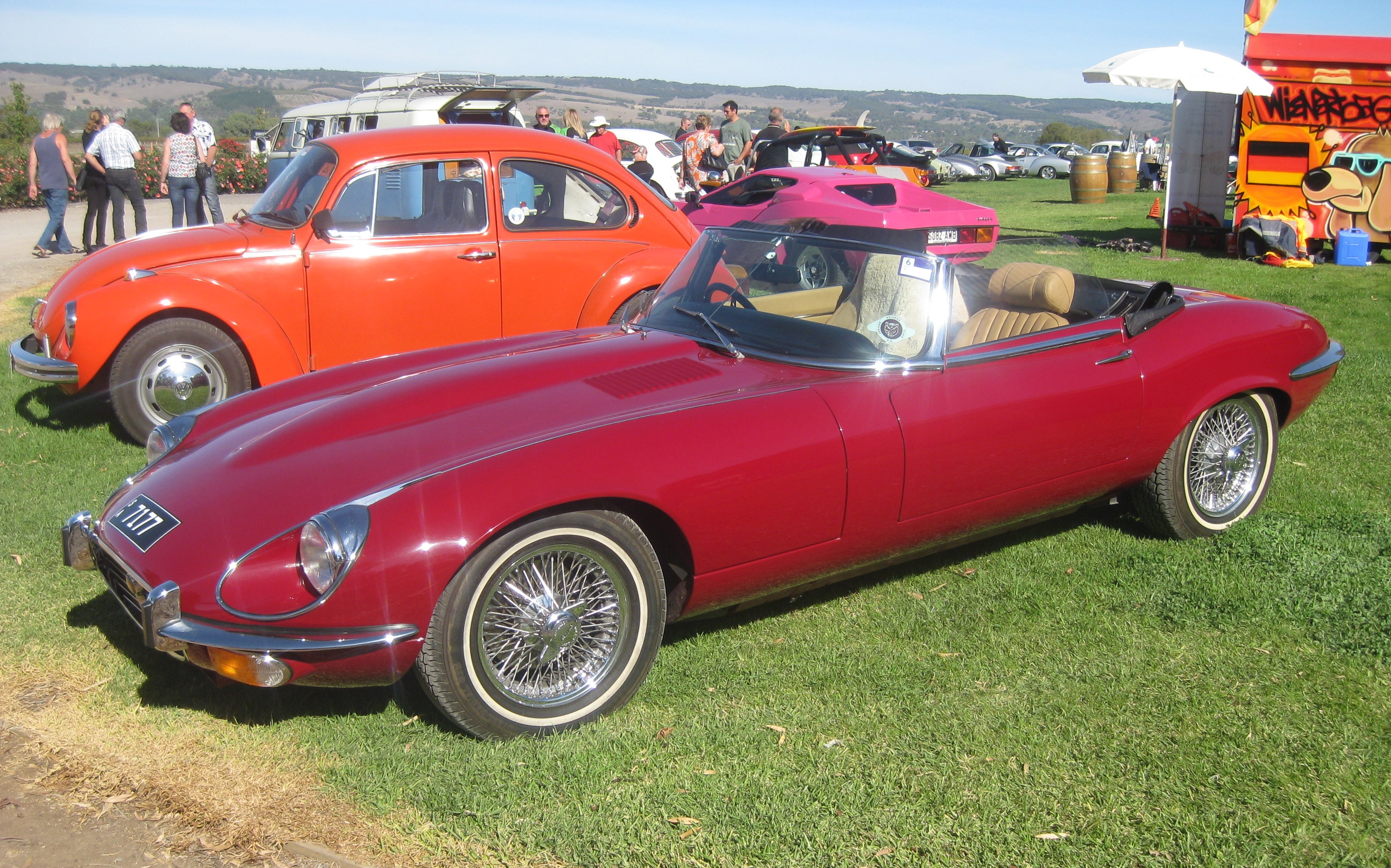
Jaguar E-Type Series 3 roadster

== Motorsport ==
Two race version of E-Type were made as test beds, the low drag coupé and lightweight E-Type, both of which were raced:

=== Low Drag Coupé (1962) ===
Shortly after the introduction of the E-Type, Jaguar wanted to investigate the possibility of building a car more in the spirit of the D-Type racer from which elements of the E-Type's styling and design were derived. One car was built to test the concept designed as a coupé. Unlike the steel production E-Types, the LDC used lightweight aluminium. Malcolm Sayer retained the original tub with lighter outer panels riveted and glued to it. The front steel sub frame remained intact, the windshield was given a more pronounced slope, and the rear hatch was welded shut. Rear brake cooling ducts appeared next to the rear windows, and the interior trim was discarded, with only insulation around the transmission tunnel. With the exception of the windscreen, all cockpit glass was Perspex. A tuned version of Jaguar's 3.8-litre engine with a wide-angle cylinder head design tested on the D-Type racers was used.

The only test bed car was completed in summer of 1962 but was sold a year later to Jaguar racing driver Dick Protheroe. Since then it has passed through the hands of several collectors on both sides of the Atlantic and is now believed to reside in the private collection of the current Viscount Cowdray.

Peter Lindner, the Jaguar distributor in Germany, had his Lightweight modified by competition department to include the low drag roof and rear panels as part of an effort to win the GT class at Le Mans. Lindner's car was more than a match for the Ferrari 250 GTO but mechanical problems forced it out of the race. Lindner was later killed in a racing accident that demolished his car, which has recently been restored.

Jaguar waited too long before committing to a racing program in earnest and what could have been a world champion in 1962 was not competitive by 1965.

=== Lightweight E-Type (1963–1964, 2014–present) ===
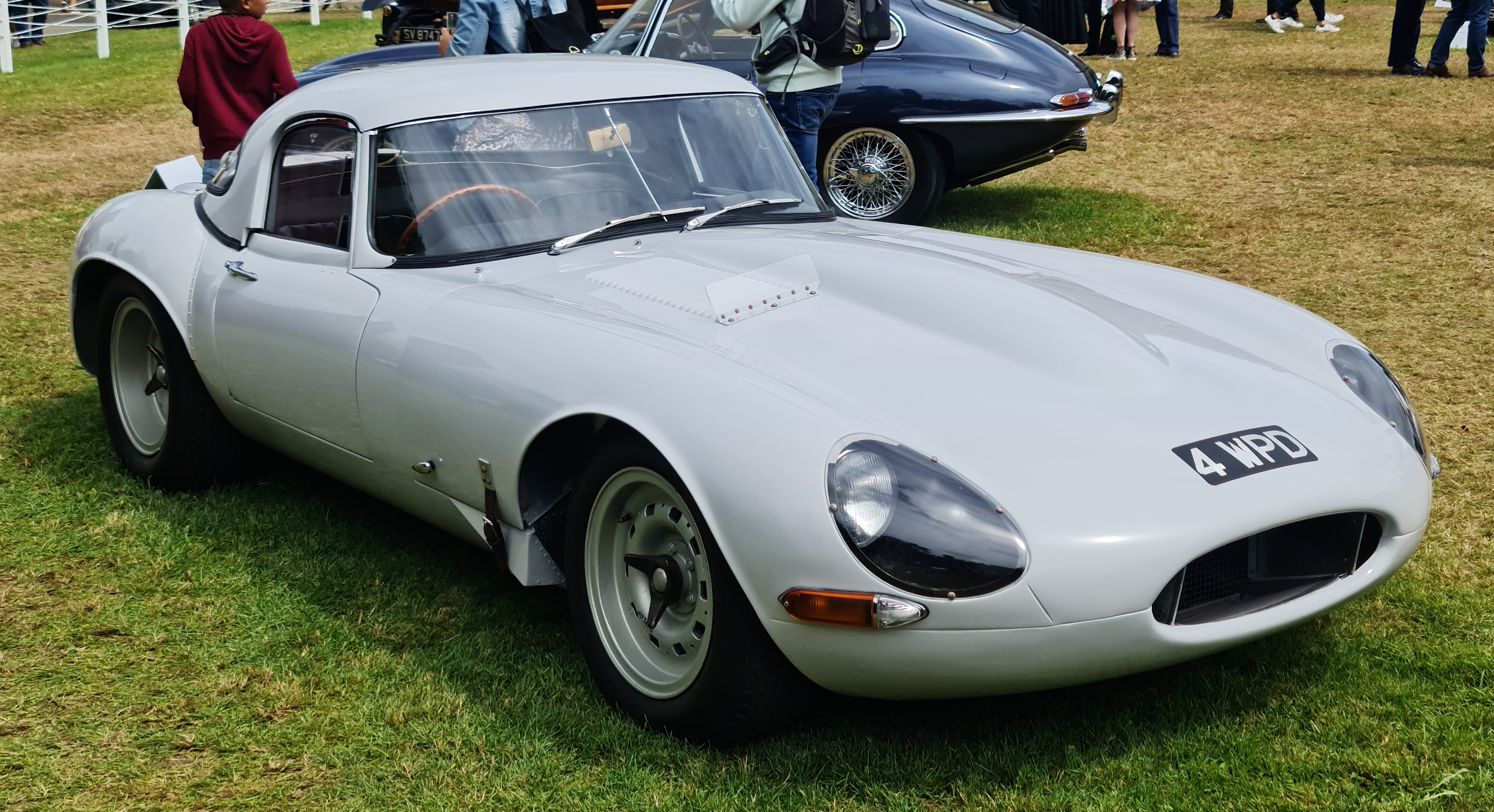
"4 WPD" was the first Lightweight roadster, chassis S850006. Here seen with hardtop at Goodwood in 2021.

Twelve lightweight cars plus two spare bodies were made by Jaguar. In some ways, this was an evolution of the low drag coupé. It made extensive use of aluminium alloy metal, in the body panels and other components. However, with at least one exception, it remained an open-top car in the spirit of the D-Type to which this car is a more direct successor than the production E-Type which is more of a GT than a sports car. The cars used an aluminium block tuned version of the production 3.8-litre Jaguar engine with 300 bhp (220 kW) output rather than the 265 bhp (198 kW) produced by the road-going version. Factory-built lightweights were homologated by Jaguar with three 45DCOE Weber carburettors in addition to a Lucas mechanical fuel injection system. Early cars were fitted with a close-ratio version of the four speed E-Type gearbox, with some later cars being fitted with a ZF five speed gearbox. The cars were entered in various races but, unlike the C-Type and D-Type racing cars, they did not win at Le Mans or Sebring but were reasonably successful in private hands and in smaller races.

One lightweight was modified by Jaguar competition department into a low drag coupé (the Lindner/Nöcker car).

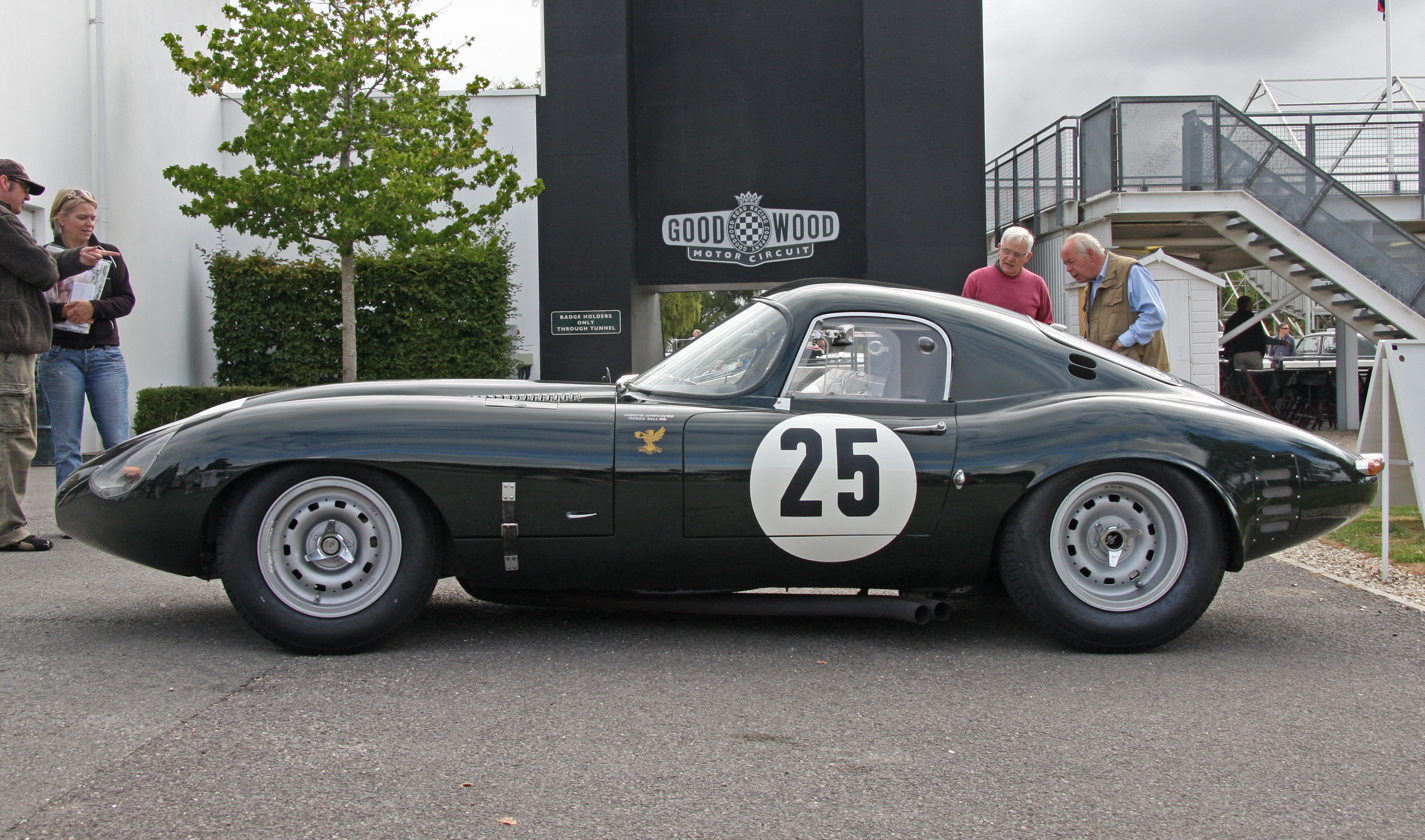
The Klat designed 1963 Jaguar E-Type Lightweight Low Drag coupé, chassis S850663

Another lightweight was modified into a unique low drag design (the Lumsden/Sargent car), by Dr Samir Klat of Imperial College. Along with the factory low drag coupe, this lightweight resided in the early 2000s in the private collection of the Viscount Cowdray. Many were fitted with more powerful engines as developments occurred. William Towns also produced 2 special bodied V12s badged as the Guyson E12

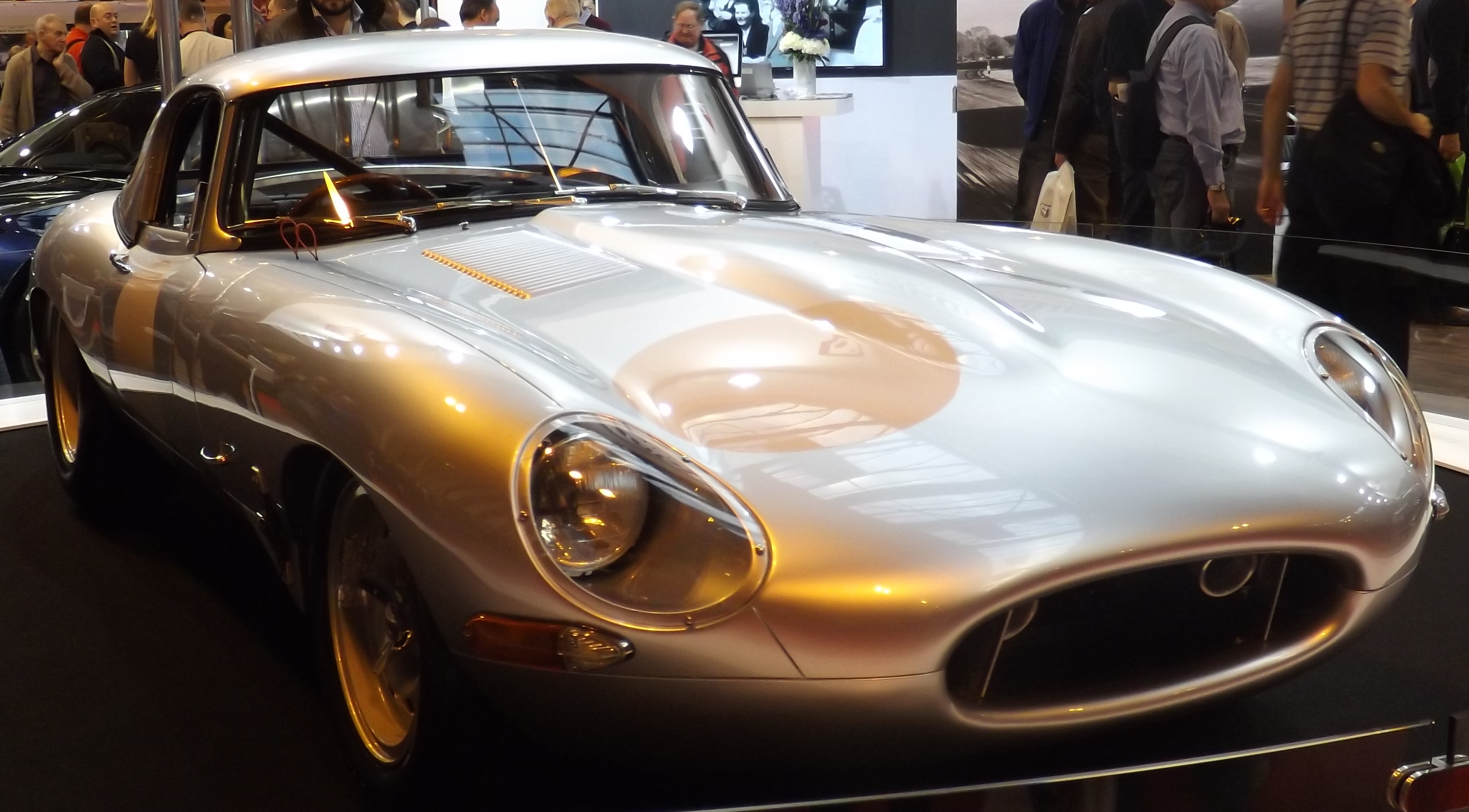
"Car Zero" with hardtop, shown at the NEC show in Birmingham, November 2014.

On 14 May 2014, Jaguar's Heritage Business announced it would be building the six 'remaining' lightweights. The original run of lightweights was meant to be 18 vehicles; however only 12 were built. The new cars, using the unused chassis codes, were hand built to exactly the same specification as the originals. Availability was prioritised for established collectors of Jaguars, with a focus on those who have an interest in historic race cars. The prototype "Car Zero" was shown at Pebble Beach in August 2014.

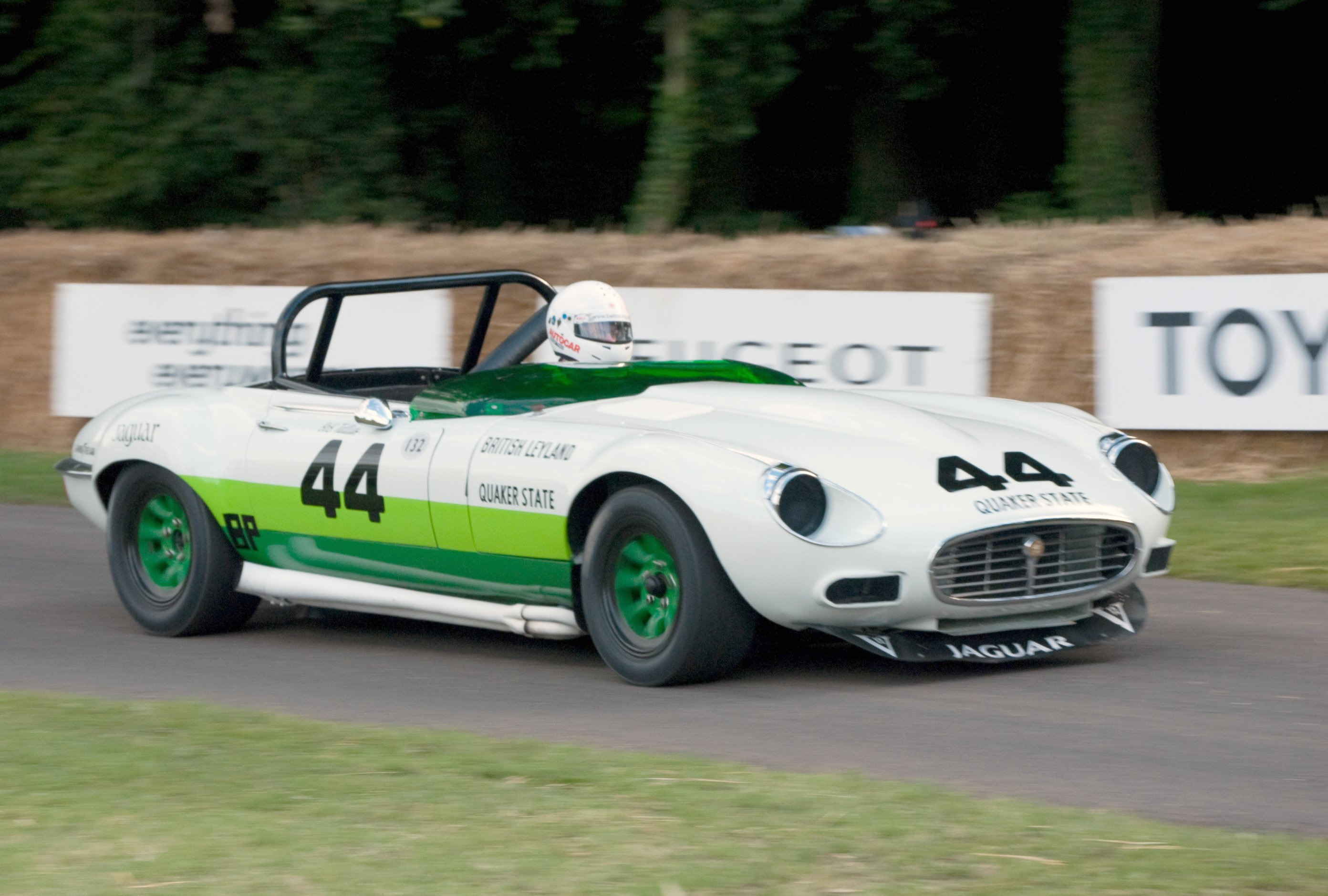
An E-Type at the 2011 Goodwood Festival of Speed in England

Bob Jane won the 1963 Australian GT Championship at the wheel of a "lightweight" E-Type.

The Jaguar E-Type was very successful in SCCA Production sports car racing with Group 44 and Bob Tullius taking the B-Production championship with a Series-3 V12 racer in 1975. A few years later, Gran-Turismo Jaguar from Cleveland Ohio campaigned a 4.2-litre six-cylinder FHC racer in SCCA production series, and in 1980 won the National Championship in the SCCA C-Production Class, defeating a fully funded factory Nissan Z-car team with Paul Newman.

== Commemoration ==
In 2013, the Jaguar E-Type featured on a "British Auto Legends" postage stamp issued by the Royal Mail.
