= 5 by 5 (Dave Clark Five album) =

Studio album by the Dave Clark Five
- Released: 20 February 1967
- Genre: Pop rock
- Length: 21:48
- Labels: Epic; LN 24236 / BN 26236
- Producer: Dave Clark

The Dave Clark Five US chronology
Satisfied with You (1966)	5 by 5 (1967)	You Got What It Takes (1967)

Singles from 5 by 5
- 1. "Nineteen Days" / "Sitting Here Baby" Released: 30 September 1966

5 by 5 is the tenth American album by the British band the Dave Clark Five. It was released on 20 February 1967 and contained the Top 50 hit "Nineteen Days". The LP reached the Billboard Top 200 and the Cashbox Top 100. The album was only released in the US; the similarly named British album (subtitled "14 Titles by Dave Clark Five") did not contain any of the same songs.

== Overview ==
The album continued the tendency of previous albums to offer a greater variety of musical styles. Genre-wise, it stood between rock and roll ("Nineteen Days"), rhythm and blues ("Something I've Always Wanted", "You Don't Want My Loving", "Small Talk"), country ("Picture Of You") and good-time music in the vein of The Lovin' Spoonful ("Sitting Here Baby"). All songs were composed by the band members and produced by Dave Clark, and the album was released in both mono (LN 24236) and stereo (BN 26236). The artwork featured the band members in a black and white photograph remotely reminiscent of the With the Beatles album. 5 by 5 was unavailable for many years before it was remastered and re-released by Dave Clark in 2019 on Spotify.

The band also recorded an instrumental song of the same title ("Five by Five"), which was used as the finale of the TV special "Hold On! It's The Dave Clark Five" in 1968. But the recording was not released until the If Somebody Loves You album.

== Reception ==
Professional ratings
Review scores
Source	Rating
AllMusic	3/5 stars

The album reached position 119 in the Billboard magazine chart, but did better in the competing Cashbox chart, reaching number 66. Cashbox magazine wrote, "The Dave Clark Five serves up a batch of rock efforts. Among the outstanding tracks are Something I've Always Wanted, You Don’t Want My Loving, and Pick Up Your Phone. The always popular quintet should find themselves with yet another hit on their hands with this album, as they perform with distinction once again."

In a retrospective review for AllMusic, Richie Unterberger wrote, "LP found the quintet playing pretty much in the same style they had been using since their first hit, even though trends were passing them by left and right by this point..." and praised the track "You Don't Want My Loving" as the best song of the album.

== Track listing ==
Side one
No.	Title	Writer(s)	Length
1.	"Nineteen Days"	Dave Clark, Denis Payton	1:55
2.	"Something I've Always Wanted"	Dave Clark, Denis Payton	2:00
3.	"Little Bit Strong"	Dave Clark, Lenny Davidson	1:21
4.	"Bernedette"	Dave Clark, Mike Smith	2:11
5.	"Sitting Here Baby"	Dave Clark, Mike Smith	2:40

Side two
No.	Title	Writer(s)	Length
1.	"You Don't Want My Loving"	Dave Clark, Denis Payton	2:42
2.	"How Can I Tell You"	Dave Clark, Lenny Davidson	2:05
3.	"Picture Of You"	Dave Clark, Denis Payton	1:50
4.	"Small Talk"	Dave Clark, Mike Smith	2:15
5.	"Pick Up Your Phone"	Dave Clark, Mike Smith	2:01

== Personnel ==
The Dave Clark Five

- Dave Clark – drums, backing vocals
- Mike Smith – lead vocals, keyboards
- Lenny Davidson – backing vocals, lead and rhythm guitars
- Rick Huxley – backing vocals, bass
- Denis Payton – backing vocals, tenor saxophone

== Charts ==
Chart (1967)	Peak position
US Billboard Top LP's	119
US Cash Box Top 100 Albums	66
US Record World 100 Top LP's	66
