= Satisfied with You =

Studio album by the Dave Clark Five
- Released: 15 August 1966
- Genres: Pop rock, beat
- Length: 21:17
- Labels: Epic; LN 24212 / BN 26212
- Producer: Dave Clark

The Dave Clark Five US chronology
Try Too Hard (1966)	Satisfied with You (1966)	5 by 5 (1967)

Singles from Try Too Hard
- 1. "Look Before You Leap" / "Please Tell Me Why" Released: 20 May 1966; 2. "Satisfied with You" / "Don't Let Me Down" Released: 22 July 1966

Satisfied with You is the ninth album released in the US by the British band the Dave Clark Five. It was released on 15 August 1966 and contained three hit songs, "Look Before You Leap", "Please Tell Me Why" and "Satisfied with You". The LP hit the Billboard Top 200 and the Cashbox Top 100.

== Overview ==
The album contained ten songs and continued the tendency of its predecessor "Try Too Hard" to offer a wider collage of styles. It included songs in the rock and roll ("Good Lovin'"), country ("Satisfied with You") and waltz ("Please Tell Me Why") styles, as well as expressive ballads ("Go On"). But in fact, it didn't stray from the tried-and-true successful style of the Dave Clark Five and had none of the progressive tendencies of the emerging psychedelic music or anti-war messages. Dave Clark said, "To me our music was to have fun with, to enjoy – not any message. That’s always been my feeling: it makes you feel good." All the songs were composed by members of the band, with the exception of a cover version of the Young Rascals' hit "Good Lovin'". Saxophonist Denis Payton wrote four songs, guitarist Lenny Davidson wrote three songs, and singer and organist Mike Smith wrote two. Dave Clark was credited as co-writer on all of the band's songs, although it is often stated that his contribution is more on the production level.

== Release and reception ==
Professional ratings
Review scores
Source	Rating
AllMusic	2/5 stars

The album was released on 15 August 1966 by Epic Records only in the United States. It was released in both mono (LN 24212) and stereo (BN 26212) versions. All recordings were produced by Dave Clark himself. The LP reached number 127 on Billboard and number 85 on Cashbox. The singles sold even better. The UK A-side "Look Before You Leap" reached number 50 in the UK chart and 101 in Billboard. Better received was the US A-side "Please Tell Me Why" (b/w "Look Before You Leap"), which became a Top 5 hit in Canada and number 28 in the US. On June 12, 1966, the group presented both songs on the famous Ed Sullivan television show. The title ballad "Satisfied with You" scored 32 in Canada and 50 in the US. The album was not reissued for a long time until 2019 when Dave Clark released a remastered version on Spotify.

Cashbox magazine wrote, "The Dave Clark Five should add to their impressive LP record with this swinging set titled after the group’s latest chart item Satisfied With You. The Britishers have added a host of top tracks to the click for a disk that should spur fans to their local retailers. Among the goodies are I Still Need You, Good Lovin’ and Do You Still Love Me."

AllMusic critic Richie Unterberger praised the band members' still strong songwriting inventiveness, but added that the album still only benefited from the previous certainty of success of the British Invasion type of songs.

== Track listing ==
Side one
No.	Title	Writer(s)	Length
1.	"Satisfied With You"	Dave Clark, Denis Payton	1:57
2.	"Go On"	Dave Clark, Lenny Davidson	2:26
3.	"Do You Still Love Me?"	Dave Clark, Denis Payton	2:03
4.	"I Meant You"	Dave Clark, Denis Payton	2:00
5.	"Look Before You Leap"	Dave Clark, Lenny Davidson	2:20

Side two
No.	Title	Writer(s)	Length
1.	"Please Tell Me Why"	Dave Clark, Mike Smith	1:34
2.	"You Never Listen"	Dave Clark, Denis Payton	2:16
3.	"I Still Need You"	Dave Clark, Lenny Davidson	2:19
4.	"It'll Only Hurt For A Little While"	Dave Clark, Mike Smith	1:46
5.	"Good Lovin'"	Artie Resnick, Rudy Clark	2:29

== Personnel ==
The Dave Clark Five

- Dave Clark - drums, backing vocals
- Mike Smith - keyboards, lead vocals
- Lenny Davidson - electric guitars, backing vocals
- Rick Huxley - bass guitar, backing vocals
- Denis Payton - tenor saxophone, backing vocals

== Charts ==
Chart (1966)	Peak position
US Billboard Top LP's	127
US Cash Box Top 100 Albums	82
US Record World 100 Top LP's	82
