= The Majors (band) =

American R&B band

- Origin: Philadelphia, Pennsylvania, U.S.
- Genres: Doo-Wop; R&B; Soul
- Years active: 1961–present
- Labels: Imperial Records
- Members: Frank Troutt, Jr. Joanna Crump; Richard Hatcher; PerryMartin; Ronald Gathers
- Past members: Ricky Cordo; Idella Morris; Eugene Glass

The Majors are an American R&B and doo-wop group from Philadelphia, Pennsylvania, United States.

The vocal ensemble formed in 1961, and featured as its lead singer Ricky Cordo, who was noted for his prominent falsetto. The group was noticed by producer Jerry Ragovoy, who produced their hit single "A Wonderful Dream", released in 1962 on Imperial Records. It would be the first of three charting hits for the group.

== Original members ==
- Ricky Cordo (lead)
- Idella Morris
- Eugene Glass
- Frank Troutt, Sr.
- Ronald Gathers
- Bobby Tate (Guitarist)

Replacements:

- Frank L Troutt Jr (lead)
- Joanna Craddock-Crump
- Richard Hatcher
- Perry Martin

== Singles ==
- "A Wonderful Dream" / "Time Will Tell" (1962) U.S. R&B No. 23, U.S. No. 22 Imperial 5855
- "She's A Troublemaker" / "A Little Bit Now (A Little Bit Later)" (1962) U.S. No. 63 Imperial 6879
- "Anything You Can Do" / "What In The World" (1963) Imperial 5914
- "Tra La La" / "What Have You Been Doin'" (1963) Imperial 5936
- "One Happy Ending" / "Get Up Now" (1963) Imperial 5968
- "Your Life Begins (At Sweet Sixteen)" / "Which Way Did She Go" (1963) Imperial 5991
- "I'll Be There (To Bring You Love)" / "Ooh Wee Baby" (1964) Imperial 66009
