= List of UK top-ten singles in 1970 =

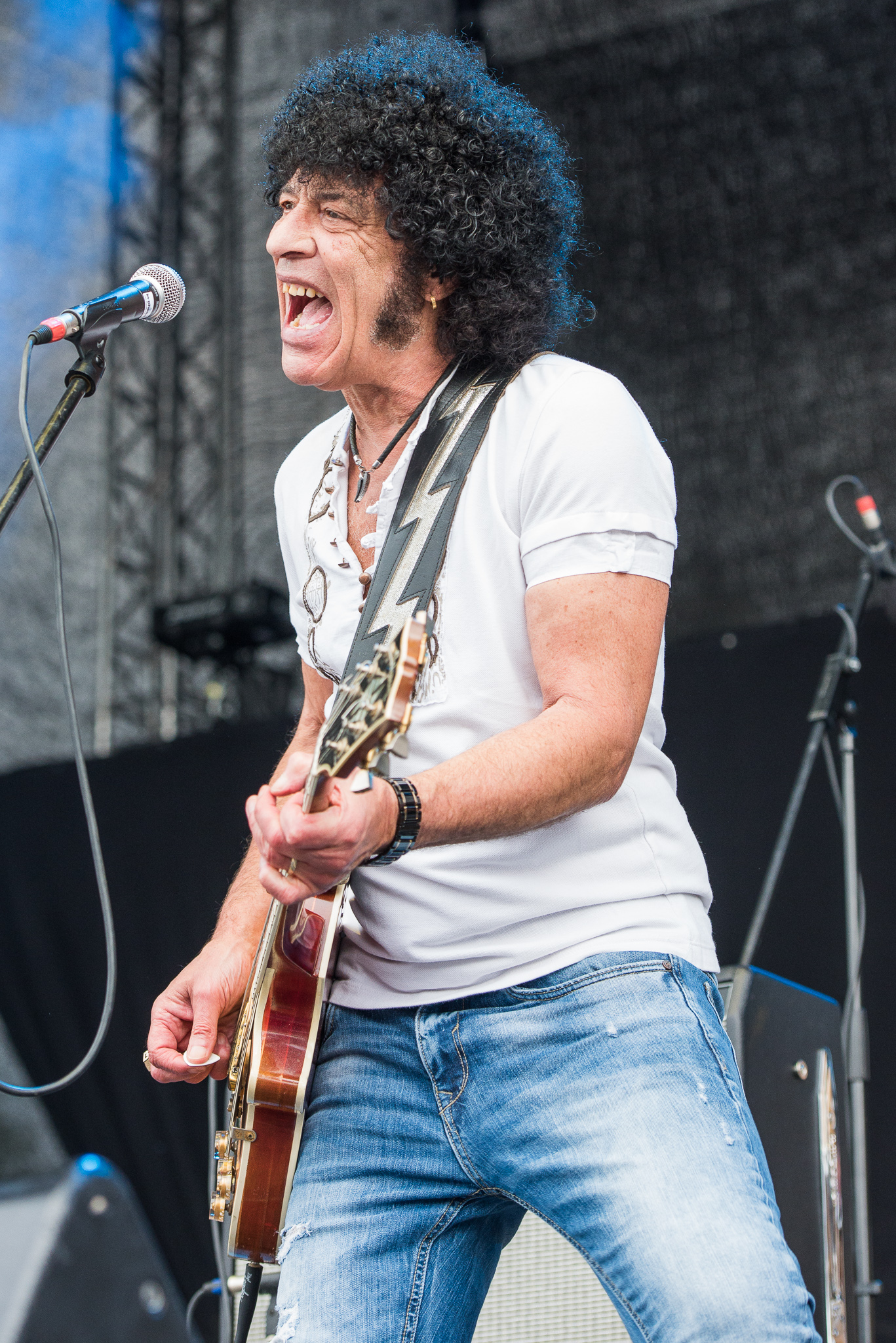
Ray Dorset (pictured in 2016) and his band Mungo Jerry had the best-selling single of 1970 with "In the Summertime", which spent seven weeks at number-one.

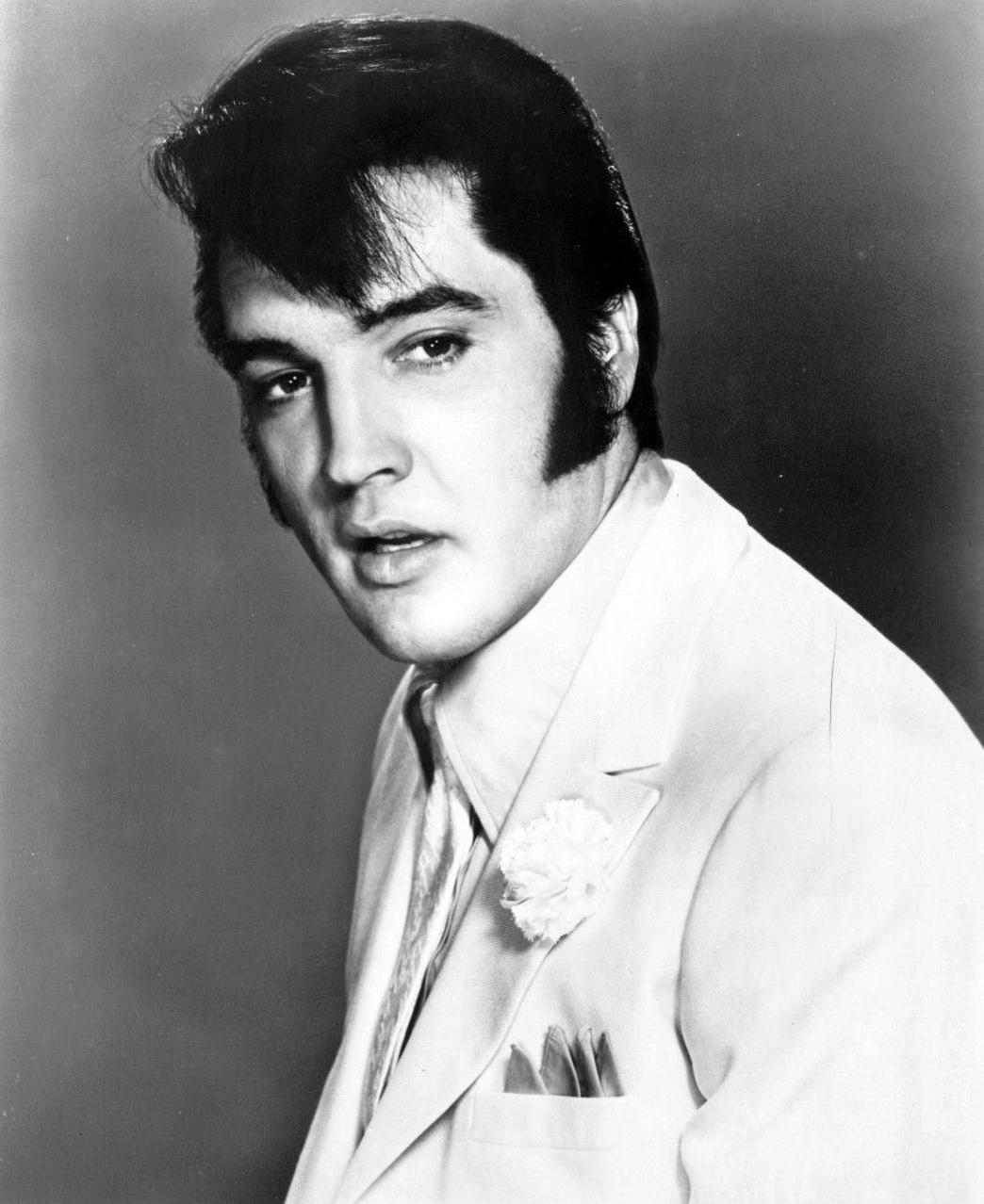
Elvis Presley secured four top 10 singles this year, including "The Wonder of You", which topped the chart for six weeks and became the second best selling single of the year.

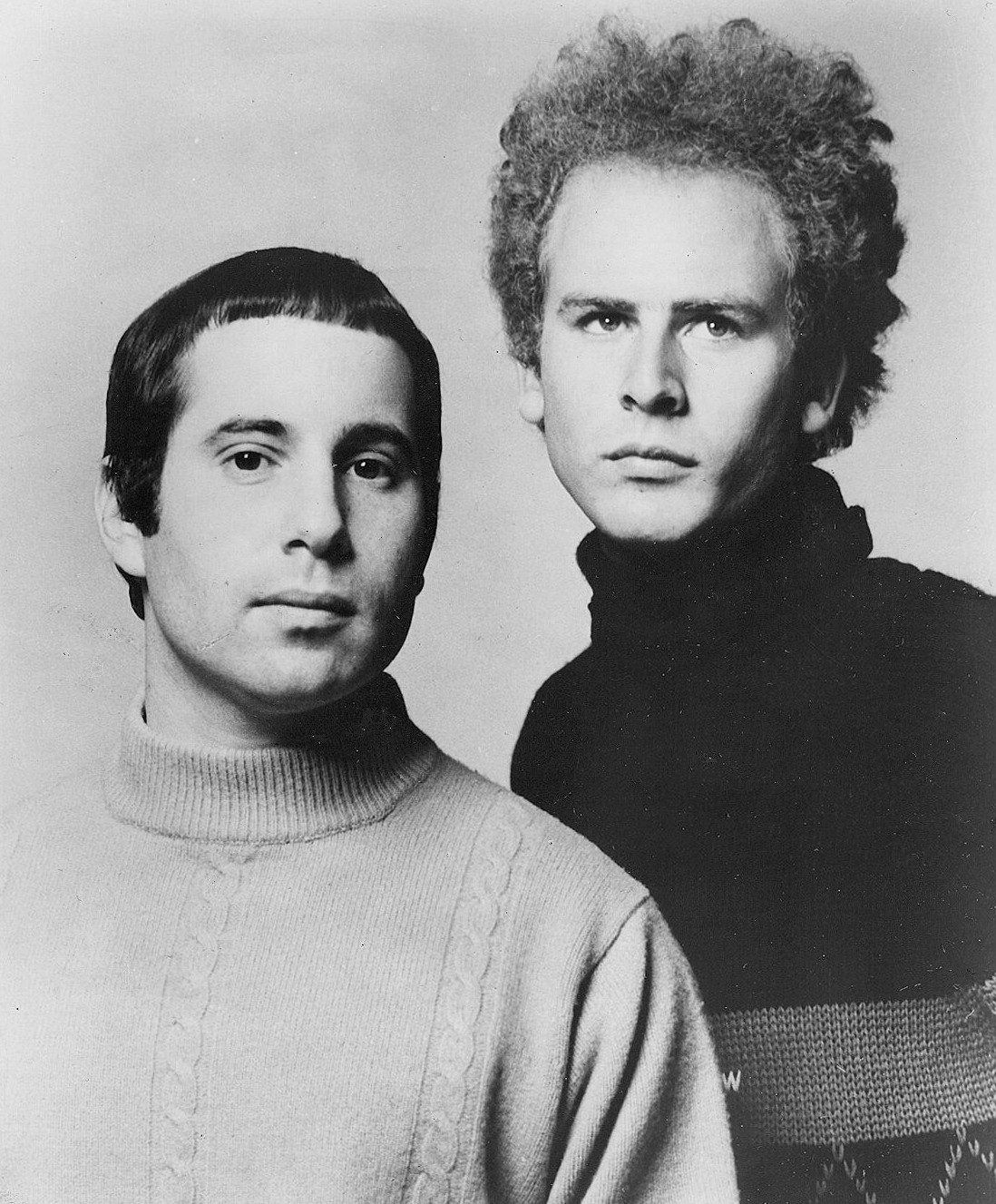
Simon & Garfunkel spent three weeks at number-one with "Bridge over Troubled Water", the title track from their album of the same name, which became the fifth best selling single of 1970.

The UK Singles Chart is one of many music charts compiled by the Official Charts Company that calculates the best-selling singles of the week in the United Kingdom. Before 2004, the chart was only based on the sales of physical singles. This list shows singles that peaked in the Top 10 of the UK Singles Chart during 1970, as well as singles which peaked in 1969 and 1971 but were in the top 10 in 1970. The entry date is when the single appeared in the top 10 for the first time (week ending, as published by the Official Charts Company, which is six days after the chart is announced).

One-hundred and twenty-two singles were in the top ten in 1970. Eleven singles from 1969 remained in the top 10 for several weeks at the beginning of the year, while "Grandad" by Clive Dunn, "I'll Be There" by The Jackson 5 and "Ride a White Swan" by T. Rex were all released in 1970 but did not reach their peak until 1971. "All I Have to Do Is Dream" by Bobbie Gentry and Glen Campbell, "Melting Pot" by Blue Mink, "Suspicious Minds" by Elvis Presley and "Tracy" by The Cuff Links were the singles from 1969 to reach their peak in 1970. Nineteen artists scored multiple entries in the top 10 in 1970. Chicago, Deep Purple, Hot Chocolate, The Jackson 5 and Neil Diamond were among the many artists who achieved their first UK charting top 10 single in 1970.

The 1969 Christmas number-one, "Two Little Boys" by Rolf Harris, remained at number-one for the first four weeks of 1970. The first new number-one single of the year was "Love Grows (Where My Rosemary Goes)" by Edison Lighthouse. Overall, fourteen different singles peaked at number-one in 1970, with fourteen unique artists having singles hit that position.

== Background ==
=== Multiple entries ===
One-hundred and twenty-two singles charted in the top 10 in 1970, with one-hundred and twelve singles reaching their peak this year.

Nineteen artists scored multiple entries in the top 10 in 1970. Elvis Presley and The Jackson 5 shared the record for most top 10 hits in 1970 with four hit singles each.

Christie was one of a number of artists with two top-ten entries, including the number-one single "Yellow River". Andy Williams, The Dave Clark Five, Gerry Monroe, Marmalade and Stevie Wonder were among the other artists who had multiple top 10 entries in 1970.

=== Chart debuts ===
Fifty artists achieved their first top 10 single in 1970, either as a lead or featured artist. Of these, five went on to record another hit single that year: Chairmen of the Board, Chicago, Christie, Gerry Monroe and White Plains. The Jackson 5 had three other entries in their breakthrough year.

The following table (collapsed on desktop site) does not include acts who had previously charted as part of a group and secured their first top 10 solo single.

Artist	Number of top 10s	First entry	Chart position	Other entries
Badfinger	1	"Come and Get It"	4	—
Edison Lighthouse	1	"Love Grows (Where My Rosemary Goes)"	1	—
Arrival	1	"Friends"	8	—
Peter, Paul and Mary	1	"Leaving on a Jet Plane"	2	—
Chicago	2	"I'm a Man"	8	"25 or 6 to 4" (7)
The Jackson 5	4	"I Want You Back"	2	"ABC" (8), "The Love You Save (7), "I'll Be There" (4) ^{[A]}
Lee Marvin	1	"Wand'rin' Star"	1	—
White Plains	2	"My Baby Loves Lovin'"	9	"Julie, Do Ya Love Me" (8)
Brotherhood of Man	1	"United We Stand"	10	—
Pickettywitch	1	"That Same Old Feeling"	5	—
Sacha Distel	1	"Raindrops Keep Falling on My Head"	10	—
Steam	1	"Na Na Hey Hey Kiss Him Goodbye"	9	—
Bob and Marcia	1	"Young, Gifted and Black"	5	—
Dana Rosemary Scallon	1	"All Kinds of Everything"	1	—
Norman Greenbaum	1	"Spirit in the Sky"	1	—
The Pipkins	1	"Gimme Dat Ding"	6	—
England World Cup Squad 1970	1	"Back Home"	1	—
Frijid Pink	1	"House of the Rising Sun"	4	—
Christie	2	"Yellow River"	1	"San Bernadino" (7)
Roger Whittaker	1	"I Don't Believe in If Anymore"	8	—
Ray Stevens	1	"Everything Is Beautiful"	6	—
Mr. Bloe	1	"Groovin' with Mr. Bloe"	2	—
Mungo Jerry	1	"In the Summertime"	1	—
Free	1	"All Right Now"	2	—
Gerry Monroe	2	"Sally"	4	"My Prayer" (9)
Nicky Thomas	1	"Love of the Common People"	9	—
Hotlegs	1	"Neanderthal Man"	2	—
Ten Years After	1	"Love Like a Man"	10	—
Fair Weather	1	"Natural Sinner"	6	—
Three Dog Night	1	"Mama Told Me Not to Come"	3	—
Chairmen of the Board	2	"Give Me Just a Little More Time"	3	"(You've Got Me) Dangling on a String" (5)
Bread	1	"Make It with You"	5	—
Freda Payne	1	"Band of Gold"	1	—
Hot Chocolate	1	"Love Is Life"	6	—
The Poppy Family	1	"Which Way You Goin', Billy?"	7	—
Bobby Bloom	1	"Montego Bay"	3	—
Deep Purple	1	"Black Night"	2	—
Black Sabbath	1	"Paranoid"	4	—
The Carpenters	1	"(They Long to Be) Close to You"	6	—
Clarence Carter	1	"Patches"	2	—
Matthews Southern Comfort	1	"Woodstock"	1	—
Edwin Starr	1	"War"	3	—
The Rattles	1	"The Witch"	8	—
Melanie	1	"Ruby Tuesday"	9	—
Don Fardon	1	"Indian Reservation"	3	—
Neil Diamond	1	"Cracklin' Rosie"	3	—
T. Rex	1	"Ride a White Swan" ^{[B]}	2	—
McGuinness Flint	1	"When I'm Dead and Gone"	2	—
Clive Dunn	1	"Grandad" ^{[C]}	2	—
Gilbert O'Sullivan	1	"Nothing Rhymed"	8	—

Notes

Yoko Ono and John Lennon both made their first appearances in the chart where they are given individual credit, both having appeared under the guise of Plastic Ono Band, the latter as a member of The Beatles. Plastic Ono Band debuted in 1969 with "Give Peace a Chance".

Fair Weather was set up by Andy Fairweather Low, formerly of the newly disbanded group Amen Corner, who had four top 10 singles between 1966 and 1969, including number-one "(If Paradise Is) Half as Nice". Dave Edmunds had been part of Love Sculpture's line-up in the late 1960s, "Sabre Dance" becoming a surprise hit. "I Hear You Knocking", his debut solo single, was 1970's Christmas number-one.

=== Songs from films ===
Original songs from various films entered the top 10 throughout the year. These included "Come and Get It" (from The Magic Christian) and "Raindrops Keep Fallin' on My Head" (Butch Cassidy and the Sundance Kid).

=== Best-selling singles ===
Mungo Jerry had the best-selling single of the year with "In the Summertime". The single spent eleven weeks in the top 10 (including seven weeks at number one). "The Wonder of You" by Elvis Presley came in second place. Freda Payne's "Band of Gold", "Spirit in the Sky" from Norman Greenbaum and "Bridge over Troubled Water" by Simon & Garfunkel made up the top five. Singles by the England World Cup Squad 1970, Free, Lee Marvin, Christie and Smokey Robinson and The Miracles were also in the top ten best-selling singles of the year.

== Top-ten singles ==
Key

Symbol	Meaning
‡	Single peaked in 1969 but still in chart in 1970.
♦	Single released in 1970 but peaked in 1971.
(#)	Year-end top-ten single position and rank
Entered	The date that the single first appeared in the chart.
Peak	Highest position that the single reached in the UK Singles Chart.

Entered (week ending)	Weeks in top 10	Single	Artist	Peak	Peak reached (week ending)	Weeks at peak
Singles in 1969
25 October 1969	14	"Sugar, Sugar" ‡	The Archies	1	25 October 1969	6
22 November 1969	8	"Yester-Me, Yester-You, Yesterday" ‡	Stevie Wonder	2	6 December 1969	1
29 November 1969	12	"Ruby, Don't Take Your Love to Town" ‡	Kenny Rogers and the First Edition	2	13 December 1969	6
29 November 1969	2	"The Liquidator" ‡ ^{[D]}	Harry J All Stars	9	29 November 1969	1
6 December 1969	12	"Two Little Boys" ‡	Rolf Harris	1	20 December 1969	6
6 December 1969	8	"Melting Pot"	Blue Mink	3	10 January 1970	1
6 December 1969	9	"Suspicious Minds"	Elvis Presley	2	17 January 1970	1
13 December 1969	4	"Winter World of Love" ‡	Engelbert Humperdinck	7	13 December 1969	1
20 December 1969	6	"Tracy"	The Cuff Links	4	10 January 1970	1
20 December 1969	7	"All I Have to Do Is Dream"	Bobbie Gentry & Glen Campbell	3	17 January 1970	1
27 December 1969	2	"Without Love (There is Nothing)" ‡	Tom Jones	10	27 December 1969	2
Singles in 1970
10 January 1970	3	"Good Old Rock 'n' Roll"	The Dave Clark Five	7	24 January 1970	1
17 January 1970	5	"Reflections of My Life"	Marmalade	3	24 January 1970	3
17 January 1970	5	"Come and Get It"	Badfinger	4	31 January 1970	1
31 January 1970	7	"Love Grows (Where My Rosemary Goes)"	Edison Lighthouse	1	31 January 1970	5
31 January 1970	2	"Friends"	Arrival	8	31 January 1970	1
31 January 1970	6	"Leaving on a Jet Plane"	Peter, Paul and Mary	2	14 February 1970	1
31 January 1970	4	"The Witch's Promise"/"Teacher"	Jethro Tull	4	14 February 1970	1
7 February 1970	2	"I'm a Man"	Chicago	8	7 February 1970	1
7 February 1970	5	"Temma Harbour"	Mary Hopkin	6	21 February 1970	1
14 February 1970	5	"Let's Work Together"	Canned Heat	2	21 February 1970	1
14 February 1970	3	"Venus"	Shocking Blue	8	28 February 1970	1
21 February 1970	5	"I Want You Back"	The Jackson 5	2	7 March 1970	1
21 February 1970	9	"Wand'rin' Star" (#8)	Lee Marvin	1	7 March 1970	3
21 February 1970	5	"Instant Karma!"	John Lennon & Yoko Ono with Plastic Ono Band	5	28 February 1970	2
28 February 1970	2	"My Baby Loves Lovin'"	White Plains	9	28 February 1970	2
28 February 1970	1	"United We Stand"	Brotherhood of Man	10	28 February 1970	1
7 March 1970	10	"Bridge over Troubled Water" (#5)	Simon & Garfunkel	1	28 March 1970	3
7 March 1970	3	"Years May Come, Years May Go"	Herman's Hermits	7	21 March 1970	1
14 March 1970	4	"Let It Be"	The Beatles	2	14 March 1970	1
14 March 1970	5	"That Same Old Feeling"	Pickettywitch	5	21 March 1970	2
14 March 1970	1	"Raindrops Keep Fallin' on My Head"	Sacha Distel	10	14 March 1970	1
21 March 1970	8	"Can't Help Falling in Love"	Andy Williams	3	28 March 1970	4
21 March 1970	3	"Don't Cry Daddy"	Elvis Presley	8	21 March 1970	1
21 March 1970	2	"Na Na Hey Hey Kiss Him Goodbye"	Steam	9	21 March 1970	1
28 March 1970	5	"Young, Gifted and Black"	Bob and Marcia	5	4 April 1970	1
28 March 1970	5	"Knock, Knock Who's There?" ^{[E]}	Mary Hopkin	2	4 April 1970	1
28 March 1970	2	"Everybody Get Together"	The Dave Clark Five	8	28 March 1970	1
4 April 1970	2	"Something's Burning"	Kenny Rogers and the First Edition	8	4 April 1970	1
11 April 1970	7	"All Kinds of Everything" ^{[F]}	Dana	1	18 April 1970	2
11 April 1970	9	"Spirit in the Sky" (#4)	Norman Greenbaum	1	2 May 1970	2
11 April 1970	4	"Gimme Dat Ding"	The Pipkins	6	18 April 1970	2
18 April 1970	3	"Farewell Is a Lonely Sound"	Jimmy Ruffin	8	2 May 1970	1
18 April 1970	1	"I Can't Help Myself (Sugar Pie Honey Bunch)"	Four Tops	10	18 April 1970	1
25 April 1970	3	"Never Had a Dream Come True"	Stevie Wonder	6	2 May 1970	1
25 April 1970	1	"Good Morning Freedom"	Blue Mink	10	25 April 1970	1
2 May 1970	8	"Back Home" (#6) ^{[G]}	England World Cup Squad 1970	1	16 May 1970	3
2 May 1970	5	"House of the Rising Sun"	Frijid Pink	4	16 May 1970	1
2 May 1970	1	"When Julie Comes Around"	The Cuff Links	10	2 May 1970	1
9 May 1970	5	"Daughter of Darkness"	Tom Jones	5	9 May 1970	3
9 May 1970	2	"Travelin' Band"	Creedence Clearwater Revival	8	9 May 1970	1
9 May 1970	3	"I Can't Tell the Bottom from the Top"	The Hollies	7	16 May 1970	1
16 May 1970	5	"Question"	The Moody Blues	2	30 May 1970	1
16 May 1970	8	"Yellow River" (#9)	Christie	1	6 June 1970	1
16 May 1970	3	"Brontosaurus"	The Move	7	23 May 1970	1
23 May 1970	2	"I Don't Believe in If Anymore"	Roger Whittaker	8	23 May 1970	2
30 May 1970	5	"Honey Come Back"	Glen Campbell	4	6 June 1970	1
30 May 1970	3	"Up the Ladder to the Roof"	The Supremes	6	30 May 1970	1
6 June 1970	3	"Everything Is Beautiful"	Ray Stevens	6	6 June 1970	1
6 June 1970	7	"Groovin' with Mr. Bloe"	Mr. Bloe	2	27 June 1970	1
6 June 1970	2	"ABC"	The Jackson 5	8	6 June 1970	1
13 June 1970	11	"In the Summertime" (#1)	Mungo Jerry	1	13 June 1970	7
13 June 1970	7	"Cotton Fields"	The Beach Boys	5	20 June 1970	2
20 June 1970	9	"All Right Now" (#7)	Free	2	4 July 1970	5
20 June 1970	5	"Sally"	Gerry Monroe	4	4 July 1970	1
20 June 1970	4	"The Green Manalishi (With the Two Prong Crown)"	Fleetwood Mac	10	20 June 1970	4
27 June 1970	4	"Goodbye Sam, Hello Samantha"	Cliff Richard	6	4 July 1970	1
27 June 1970	1	"Abraham, Martin and John"	Marvin Gaye	9	27 June 1970	1
4 July 1970	6	"It's All in the Game"	Four Tops	5	11 July 1970	2
4 July 1970	5	"Up Around the Bend"	Creedence Clearwater Revival	3	18 July 1970	1
11 July 1970	2	"Love of the Common People" ^{[H]}	Nicky Thomas	9	11 July 1970	2
18 July 1970	7	"Lola"	The Kinks	2	8 August 1970	1
18 July 1970	8	"Something"	Shirley Bassey	4	15 August 1970	1
25 July 1970	11	"The Wonder of You" (#2) ^{[I]}	Elvis Presley	1	1 August 1970	6
25 July 1970	7	"Neanderthal Man"	Hotlegs	2	15 August 1970	2
1 August 1970	4	"I'll Say Forever My Love"	Jimmy Ruffin	7	8 August 1970	1
1 August 1970	2	"Lady D'Arbanville"	Cat Stevens	8	8 August 1970	1
8 August 1970	2	"Love Like a Man"	Ten Years After	10	8 August 1970	2
15 August 1970	3	"Natural Sinner"	Fair Weather	6	15 August 1970	2
15 August 1970	5	"Rainbow"	Marmalade	3	22 August 1970	1
22 August 1970	7	"The Tears of a Clown" (#10)	Smokey Robinson & The Miracles	1	12 September 1970	1
22 August 1970	2	"The Love You Save"	The Jackson 5	7	22 August 1970	1
29 August 1970	3	"25 or 6 to 4"	Chicago	7	29 August 1970	2
29 August 1970	5	"Mama Told Me Not to Come"	Three Dog Night	3	5 September 1970	2
5 September 1970	5	"Give Me Just a Little More Time"	Chairmen of the Board	3	19 September 1970	2
5 September 1970	4	"Make It with You"	Bread	5	12 September 1970	1
5 September 1970	1	"Sweet Inspiration"	Johnny Johnson and the Bandwagon	10	5 September 1970	1
12 September 1970	10	"Band of Gold" (#3)	Freda Payne	1	19 September 1970	6
12 September 1970	2	"Wild World"	Jimmy Cliff	8	12 September 1970	1
12 September 1970	3	"Love Is Life" ^{[J]}	Hot Chocolate	6	19 September 1970	1
19 September 1970	6	"You Can Get It If You Really Want"	Desmond Dekker	2	3 October 1970	2
19 September 1970	5	"Which Way You Goin' Billy?"	The Poppy Family	7	26 September 1970	2
26 September 1970	5	"Montego Bay" ^{[K]}	Bobby Bloom	3	3 October 1970	1
26 September 1970	7	"Black Night"	Deep Purple	2	17 October 1970	2
3 October 1970	5	"Paranoid"	Black Sabbath	4	10 October 1970	1
10 October 1970	3	"(They Long to Be) Close to You"	The Carpenters	6	10 October 1970	1
10 October 1970	4	"Ain't No Mountain High Enough"	Diana Ross	6	17 October 1970	1
10 October 1970	6	"Me and My Life"	The Tremeloes	4	17 October 1970	3
17 October 1970	4	"Ball of Confusion (That's What the World Is Today)"	The Temptations	7	31 October 1970	2
24 October 1970	6	"Patches"	Clarence Carter	2	31 October 1970	3
24 October 1970	6	"Woodstock"	Matthews Southern Comfort	1	31 October 1970	3
31 October 1970	1	"Still Water (Love)"	Four Tops	10	31 October 1970	1
7 November 1970	4	"War"	Edwin Starr	3	14 November 1970	1
7 November 1970	3	"The Witch"	The Rattles	8	7 November 1970	3
7 November 1970	3	"Ruby Tuesday"	Melanie	9	7 November 1970	3
14 November 1970	5	"Indian Reservation"	Don Fardon	3	21 November 1970	2
14 November 1970	5	"Voodoo Chile"	The Jimi Hendrix Experience	1	21 November 1970	1
14 November 1970	2	"San Bernadino"	Christie	7	14 November 1970	2
21 November 1970	2	"It's Wonderful (To Be Loved by You)" ^{[L]}	Jimmy Ruffin	6	21 November 1970	1
21 November 1970	10	"Cracklin' Rosie" ^{[M]}	Neil Diamond	3	5 December 1970	4
28 November 1970	10	"I Hear You Knocking"	Dave Edmunds	1	28 November 1970	6
28 November 1970	9	"Ride a White Swan" ♦ ^{[N]}	T. Rex	2	23 January 1971	1
28 November 1970	3	"I've Lost You"	Elvis Presley	9	28 November 1970	2
28 November 1970	2	"Julie, Do Ya Love Me"	White Plains	8	5 December 1970	1
5 December 1970	4	"(You've Got Me) Dangling on a String"	Chairmen of the Board	5	5 December 1970	1
5 December 1970	8	"When I'm Dead and Gone"	McGuinness Flint	2	12 December 1970	3
12 December 1970	6	"It's Only Make Believe"	Glen Campbell	4	12 December 1970	4
12 December 1970	6	"Home Lovin' Man"	Andy Williams	7	12 December 1970	4
19 December 1970	8	"I'll Be There" ♦	The Jackson 5	4	23 January 1971	1
19 December 1970	10	"Grandad" ♦	Clive Dunn	1	9 January 1971	3
19 December 1970	5	"Nothing Rhymed"	Gilbert O'Sullivan	8	19 December 1970	4
19 December 1970	3	"My Prayer"	Gerry Monroe	9	19 December 1970	3

== Entries by artist ==
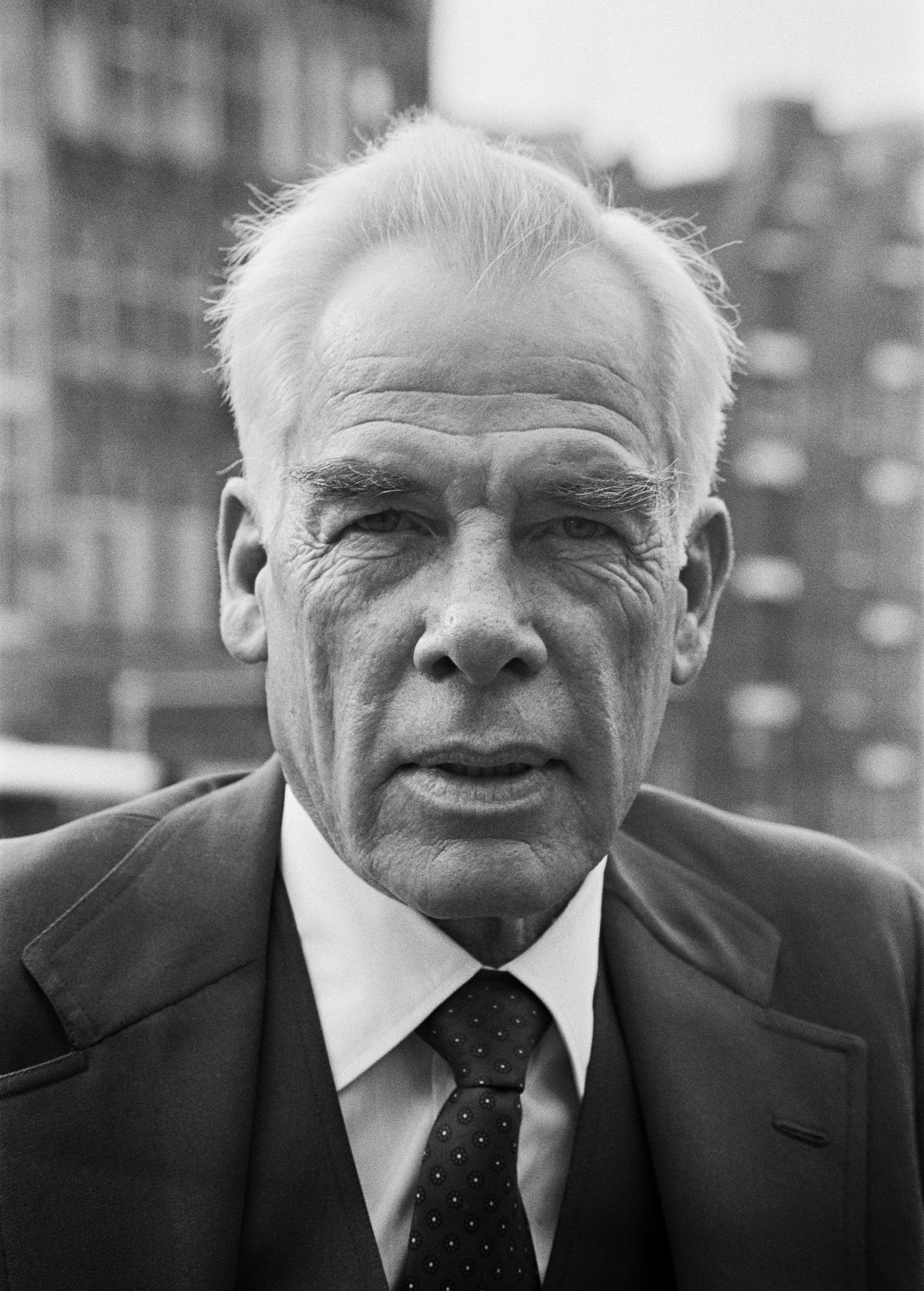
Lee Marvin spent three weeks at number-one with "Wand'rin' Star", taken from the movie Paint Your Wagon, which became the eighth best selling single of this year. Because Marvin never released a follow-up single, he is considered a one-hit wonder.

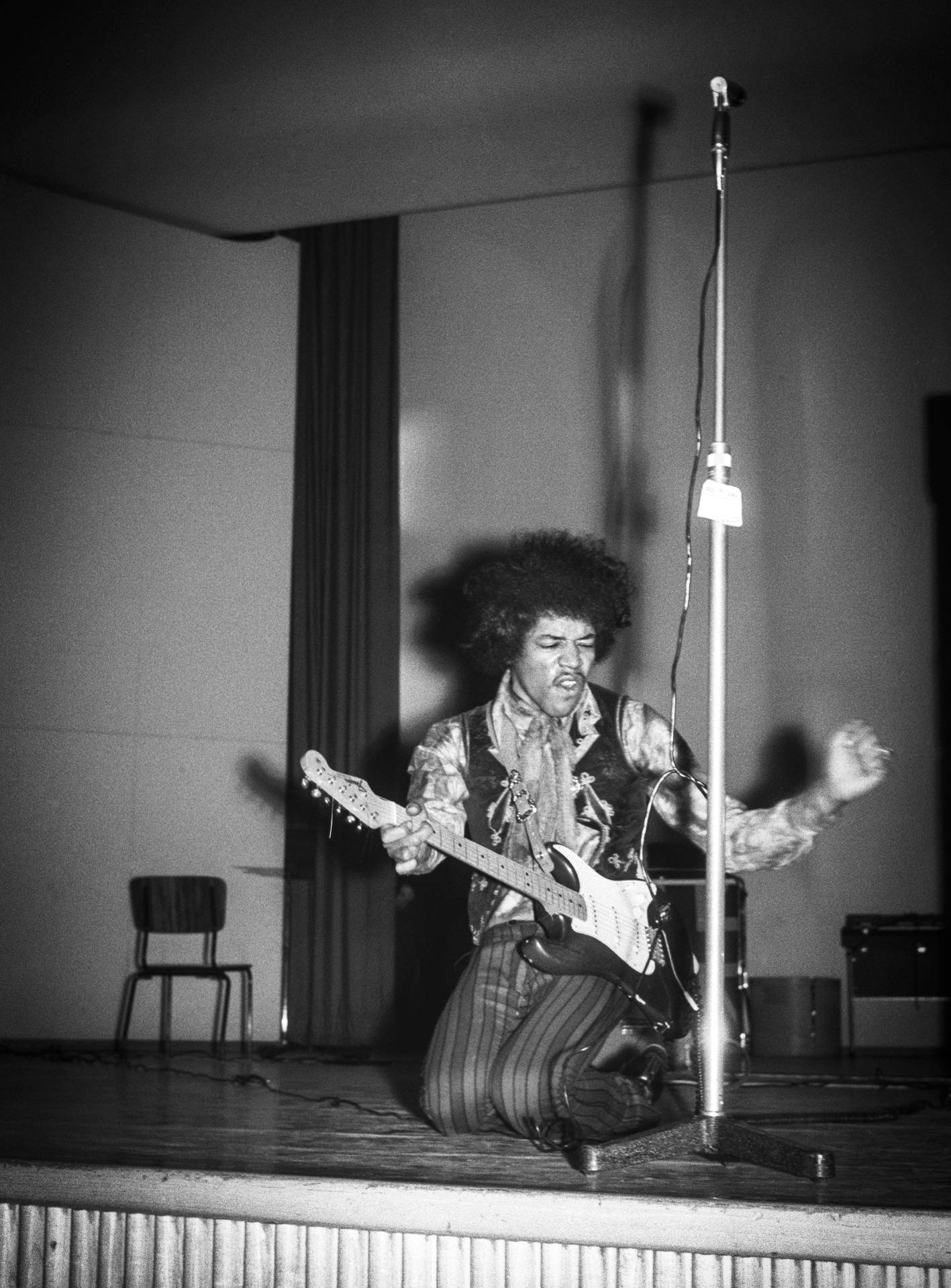
In November 1970, two months after his death, Jimi Hendrix achieved a posthumous UK number-one single with "Voodoo Chile".

The following table shows artists who achieved two or more top 10 entries in 1970, including singles that reached their peak in 1969 or 1971. The figures include both main artists and featured artists, while appearances on ensemble charity records are also counted for each artist. The total number of weeks an artist spent in the top ten in 1970 is also shown.

Entries	Artist	Weeks	Singles
4	Elvis Presley ^{[O]}	22	"Don't Cry Daddy", "I've Lost You", "Suspicious Minds", "The Wonder of You"
4	The Jackson 5 ^{[P]}	11	"ABC", "I'll Be There", "I Want You Back", "The Love You Save"
3	Four Tops	8	"I Can't Help Myself (Sugar Pie Honey Bunch)", "It's All in the Game", "Still Water (Love)"
3	Glen Campbell ^{[O]}	13	"All I Have to Do Is Dream", "Honey Come Back", "It's Only Make Believe"
3	Jimmy Ruffin	9	"Farewell Is a Lonely Sound", "I'll Say Forever My Love", "It's Wonderful (To Be Loved by You)"
2	Andy Williams	11	"Can't Help Falling in Love", "Home Lovin' Man"
2	Blue Mink ^{[O]}	5	"Good Morning Freedom", "Melting Pot"
2	Chairmen of the Board	9	"Give Me Just a Little More Time", "(You've Got Me) Dangling on a String"
2	Chicago	5	"25 or 6 to 4", "I'm a Man"
2	Christie	10	"San Bernadino", "Yellow River"
2	Creedence Clearwater Revival	7	"Travelin' Band", "Up Around the Bend"
2	The Cuff Links ^{[O]}	5	"Tracy", "When Julie Comes Around"
2	The Dave Clark Five	5	"Everybody Get Together", "Good Old Rock 'n' Roll"
2	Gerry Monroe	7	"My Prayer", "Sally"
2	John Lennon ^{[R]}	8	"Instant Karma!", "Let It Be"
2	Kenny Rogers and the First Edition ^{[Q]}	9	"Ruby, Don't Take Your Love to Town", "Something's Burning"
2	Marmalade	10	"Rainbow", "Reflections of My Life"
2	Mary Hopkin	10	"Knock, Knock Who's There?", "Temma Harbour"
2	Stevie Wonder ^{[Q]}	5	"Never Had a Dream Come True", "Yester-Me, Yester-You, Yesterday"
2	White Plains	7	"Julie, Do Ya Love Me, "My Baby Loves Lovin'"

== Notes ==
- ^{a} "I'll Be There" reached its peak of number four on 23 January 1971 (week ending).
- ^{b} "Ride a White Swan" reached its peak of number two on 23 January 1971 (week ending).
- ^{c} "Grandad" reached its peak of number-one on 9 January 1971 (week ending).
- ^{d} "The Liquidator" re-entered the top 10 at number 10 on 10 January 1970 (week ending).
- ^{e} "Knock, Knock Who's There?" was the United Kingdom's entry at the Eurovision Song Contest in 1970.
- ^{f} "All Kinds of Everything" was Ireland's winning entry at the Eurovision Song Contest in 1970.
- ^{g} "Back Home" was recorded by the England football team as the official single supporting their 1970 FIFA World Cup campaign.
- ^{h} "Love of the Common People" re-entered the top 10 at number 9 on 25 July 1970 (week ending).
- ^{i} "The Wonder of You" is listed as the best-selling single of the year by some sources, but the Official Charts Company gives the title to "In the Summertime" (sales cut-off date 19 December 1970).
- ^{j} "Love Is Life" re-entered the top 10 at number 10 on 3 October 1970 (week ending).
- ^{k} "Montego Bay" re-entered the top 10 at number 8 on 31 October 1970 (week ending).
- ^{l} "It's Wonderful (To Be Loved by You)" re-entered the top 10 at number 10 on 5 December 1970 (week ending).
- ^{m} "Cracklin' Rosie" re-entered the top 10 at number 10 on 30 January 1971 (week ending).
- ^{n} "Ride a White Swan" re-entered the top 10 at number 10 on 2 January 1971 (week ending) for 6 weeks.
- ^{o} Figure includes single that first charted in 1969 but reached its peak in 1970.
- ^{p} Figure includes single that peaked in 1971.
- ^{q} Figure includes single that peaked in 1969.
- ^{r} Figure includes one top 10 hit with the group The Beatles.

== See also ==
- 1970 in British music
- List of number-one singles from the 1970s (UK)
