= The Impossible Dream (Jerry Vale album) =

Studio album by Jerry Vale
- Released: January 1967
- Genre: Traditional pop
- Length: 33:45
- Labels: Columbia; CL 2583; CS 9383
- Producer: Mike Berniker

Jerry Vale chronology
Sings Everybody Loves Somebody and Other Hits (1966)	The Impossible Dream (1967)	Time Alone Will Tell and Other Great Hits of Today (1967)

Singles from The Impossible Dream
- 1. "Dommage, Dommage (Too Bad, Too Bad)" Released: August 1966

The Impossible Dream is a studio album by American singer and actor Jerry Vale released in early 1967 by Columbia Records. The album consisted mainly of songs from motion pictures and musicals, containing a total of 11 tracks. One single was included as well, "Dommage, Dommage (Too Bad, Too Bad)", which was a big easy listening hit the previous year. The Impossible Dream received a positive critical reception and reached the US album charts. Results were published by Billboard, Cashbox, and Record World. Chart positions varied from number 117 to number 87.

== Background and recording ==
Jerry Vale had been a recording artist for Columbia since the 1950s, recording several pop hits. In the early 1960s, Vale achieved major commercial success via his albums featuring English and Italian standards. Vale would repeat the format with The Impossible Dream. The title track itself was from the 1965 musical Man of La Mancha. Like his previous release, the album was produced by Mike Berniker with arrangements by Glenn Osser and Marty Manning.

== Content and release ==
The Impossible Dream consisted of 11 tracks in total. All but three of the tracks came from movies and musicals. The three, "What Now My Love" and "Strangers in the Night", and "Dommage, Dommage (Too Bad, Too Bad)" were recent pop hits instead. "Smile" and "My Foolish Heart" were the oldest selections, first being recorded in 1936 and 1949 respectively.

The Impossible Dream was originally released in January 1967 by Columbia. It was the sixteenth studio album of Vale's career. The label originally offered it as a vinyl LP, with five songs on "Side A" and six songs on "Side B". It was available in stereo and monaural sound. In February, Columbia released it as an 8-track cartridge as part of a group of nine albums made available on the format by the label that month. Since then, it has been digitized onto streaming platforms in the 2020s as well.

== Critical reception ==
The album received a positive critical reception upon its release. Cashbox magazine said that "Vale presents an album of romantic ballads," stating that "The artist's smooth, robust vocal style is ideally suited to the warm love songs on the LP, and the package should find favor with the singer’s many fans." The Post-Crescent believed that Vale's "styling are familiar," and stated that "as long as he turns recordings with such obvious conscientious performances, he will remain popular".

== Chart performance and singles ==
The album debuted on Billboard magazine's Top LP's chart in the issue dated March 18, 1967, peaking at No. 117 during a twenty-three-week run on the chart. The album entered Cashbox magazine's Looking Ahead Albums chart in the issue dated January 18, 1967, reaching No. 102 in March. It entered the Record World 100 Top LP's chart in the issue dated February 18, 1967, peaking at No. 87 in April 1967 during a seven-week run on the chart.

"Dommage, Dommage (Too Bad, Too Bad)" was released as a single in August 1966 backed by "Promises". It became a top-10 single on America's Billboard Easy Listening chart, rising to the number 5 position. The song debuted on Billboard magazine's pop-oriented Hot 100 chart in the issue dated October 8, peaking at number 93 during a two-week run on it. "Dommage, Dommage" became Vale's second biggest Easy Listening hit at that point, and the final Hot 100 entry of his career.

== Track listing ==
Side one
No.	Title	Writer(s)	Length
1.	"Smile" (from the motion picture Modern Times)	Charlie Chaplin; Geoffrey Parsons; John Turner	3:05
2.	"What Now My Love"	Carl Sigman; Gilbert Bécaud; Pierre Delanoë	3:20
3.	"Strangers in the Night"	Bert Kaempfert; Charles Singleton; Eddie Snyder	2:32
4.	"Gigi" (from the M-G-M motion picture Gigi)	Alan Jay Lerner; Frederick Loewe	3:26
5.	"Three Coins in the Fountain" (from the motion picture Three Coins in the Fountain)	Sammy Cahn; Jule Styne	3:58
Total length:			16:21

Side two
No.	Title	Writer(s)	Length
1.	"The Impossible Dream (The Quest)" (from the musical Man of La Mancha)	Joe Darion; Mitch Leigh	2:32
2.	"Somewhere, My Love" ("Laura's Theme" from the M-G-M motion picture Doctor Zhivago)	Maurice Jarre; Paul Francis Webster	3:18
3.	"The Shadow of Your Smile" (Love Theme from The Sandpiper)	Johnny Mandel; Paul Francis Webster	3:07
4.	"More" (Theme from the motion picture Mondo Cane)	Riz Ortolani; Norman Newell; Nino Oliviero	3:19
5.	"My Foolish Heart" (from the motion picture My Foolish Heart)	Ned Washington; Victor Young	3:13
6.	"Dommage, Dommage (Too Bad, Too Bad)"	Lee Pockriss; Paul Vance	2:55
Total length:			17:24

== Charts ==
Chart peaks for The Impossible Dream
Chart (1967)	Peak position
US Billboard Top LP's	117
US Cashbox Top 100 Albums	102
US Record World 100 Top LP's	87

== Release history ==
Region	Date	Format	Label	Ref.
North America	January 1967	LP Stereo; LP Monaural	Columbia Records	
North America	January 1967	4-track cartridge	Columbia Records	
North America	February 1967	8-track cartridge	Columbia Records	
Worldwide	Circa 2020	Music download; streaming	Sony Music Entertainment	

== Personnel ==
All credits are adapted from the liner notes of The Impossible Dream.

- Jerry Vale – vocals
- Glenn Osser, (tracks: A1 to A2, A4 to B6) – arranger, conductor
- Marty Manning, (tracks: A3) – arranger, conductor
- Don Hunstein – photography
- Sandy Speiser – photography
- Mike Berniker – producer
