= The Dave Clark Five Play Good Old Rock & Roll =

Studio album by The Dave Clark Five
- Released: December 1971
- Genre: Rock and roll
- Length: 24:30
- Label: EMI/Starline; SRS 5090
- Producer: Dave Clark

The Dave Clark Five UK chronology
If Somebody Loves You (1970)	The Dave Clark Five Play Good Old Rock & Roll (1971)	Dave Clark & Friends (1972)

Singles from The Dave Clark Five Play Good Old Rock & Roll
- 1. "Good Old Rock 'n' Roll" Released: 21 November 1969; 2. "More Good Old Rock 'n' Roll" Released: 23 October 1970

Alternate UK cover art (1972)
- Album re-issue on Music For Pleasure

The Dave Clark Five Play Good Old Rock & Roll (subtitled "18 Golden Oldies") is an album by the Dave Clark Five released in 1971, after the band's breakup. It was released by EMI/Starline label and sometimes is classified as a compilation, as most of the tracks were first released on two EPs (in 1969 and 1970). Dave Clark included the album in the band's core collection and remastered and re-released it on Spotify in 2019.

== Overview ==
This is the band's only album composed entirely of cover versions of well-known American rock and roll songs. The core of the album consists of two popular hit medleys, the top ten hit "Good Old Rock 'n' Roll" (peaked on the UK chart at No. 7, 1969) and its sequel "More Good Old Rock 'n' Roll" (reached No. 34, 1970). Keith Altham called the first part of the album "a party piece for the hit parade" in his article in Record Mirror magazine. Singer Mike Smith in the same interview with Altham said, "Originally the record Good Old Rock and Roll was a Cat Mother & the All Night Newsboys hit in America but Dave recognised the potential and when it died a death here we decided to resurrect it."

The singles had overdubbed applause to simulate a live recording, but the LP version omitted this effect. The album also includes full versions of songs such as "Raining In My Heart", "Lucille", "Reelin' and Rockin'", "One Night" and "Memphis, Tennessee". All songs were sung by Mike Smith.

== Release ==
The Good Old Rock & Roll album was initially released by Starline (a label associated with EMI), with a modified gold record on the cover, but with no picture of the band members (on the back of the cover was featured an artistic caricature of Dave Clark). In 1972, a second version of the LP was released on the Music For Pleasure label (an EMI label designed for budget-priced LPs), which already had a photo of the band and a sleeve note by Roger St. Pierre. Pierre wrote that the group added "something of their own brillant individuality" to the songs. Although the album was available in countries on almost every continent (e.g., the UK, Germany, France, Turkey, Australia, New Zealand, Japan, South Africa), it was not released in the United States. This was probably because of the failure of the single "More Good Old Rock 'n' Roll" (due to the band's decision, the single "Good Old Rock 'n' Roll" was not released for the US market).

== Reception ==
Professional ratings
Review scores
Source	Rating
AllMusic	2.5/5 stars

In his AllMusic retrospective review of the release, Richie Unterberger wrote, "Mike Smith does sing everything with commendable commitment, but otherwise these are routine late-'60s hard rock interpretations that don't have much similarity to the mid-'60s Dave Clark Five sound." Singer and songwriter John E Vistic called the album one of his favorites and said, "Every tune on it is epic rock and roll gold."

== Track listing ==
Side one
No.	Title	Writer(s)	Length
1.	"Good Old Rock 'n' Roll incl. Sweet Little Sixteen / Long Tall Sally / Chantilly Lace / Whole Lotta Shakin' Goin' On / Blue Suede Shoes"	various composers	3:28
2.	"Raining In My Heart"	Felice Bryant, Boudleaux Bryant	2:48
3.	"Lucille"	Albert Collins, Little Richard	2:44
4.	"Reelin' and Rockin'"	Chuck Berry	2:47

Side two
No.	Title	Writer(s)	Length
1.	"More Good Old Rock 'n' Roll incl. Rock And Roll Music / Blueberry Hill / Good Golly Miss Molly / My Blue Heaven / Keep A-Knockin'"	various composers	2:57
2.	"Loving You"	Jerry Leiber, Mike Stoller	2:29
3.	"Memphis, Tennessee"	Chuck Berry	2:43
4.	"One Night"	Dave Bartholomew, Pearl King, Anita Steinman	2:37
5.	"Lawdy Miss Clawdy"	Lloyd Price	1:57
