= Dommage, Dommage (Too Bad, Too Bad) =

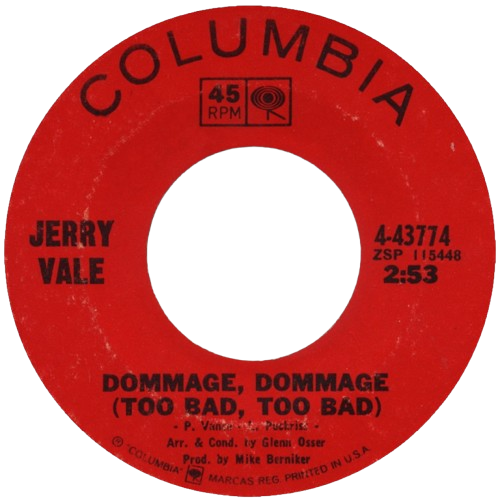

Single by Jerry Vale

from the album The Impossible Dream
- B-side: "Promises"
- Released: August 1966
- Genre: Pop; easy listening
- Length: 2:53
- Label: Columbia Records
- Songwriters: Lee Pockriss and Paul Vance
- Producer: Mike Berniker

Jerry Vale singles chronology
"It'll Take a Little Time" (1966)	"Dommage, Dommage (Too Bad, Too Bad)" (1966)	"I've Lost My Heart Again" (1967)

"Dommage, Dommage (Too Bad, Too Bad)" is a 1966 song written by Lee Pockriss and Paul Vance. It was most notably performed by Jerry Vale, who released it as a single in mid 1966. His version reached the US pop and easy listening-oriented charts. It was the only single for his 1967 album The Impossible Dream. Other versions were released by Steve Rossi and Vance himself.

== Background and releases ==
Paul Vance had been a songwriter since the 1950s, writing several hits for artists like Perry Como. In 1966, along with his main songwriting partner at the time, he wrote "Dommage, Dommage (Too Bad, Too Bad)." It was originally intended as a demo recording by Vance for Scepter Records, but under the firm's president's request, it was released as a single soon after. For Vance's version, Lee Pockriss arranged it and the two songwriters co-produced it.

Jerry Vale had been a recording artist for Columbia since the 1950s, recording several pop hits. In the early 1960s, Vale achieved major commercial success via his albums and singles featuring English and Italian standards. Vale would repeat the format with "Dommage, Dommage". In August his label released "Dommage, Dommage (Too Bad, Too Bad)" as the lead single for his The Impossible Dream LP. The song was described by critics as "remorse about a romance which ends up on the rocks." The single was produced by Mike Berniker, and arranged by Glenn Osser.

== Critical reception ==
Professional ratings
Review scores
Source	Rating
Billboard	Positive (Spotlight)
Cashbox	Positive (Pick of the Week)

The single received a positive critical reception upon its release. Billboard magazine stated that "The much recorded ballad is given a warm, commercial reading by Vale and it should rapidly climb the chart," believing that it is the "Strongest Vale entry in some time." Cashbox believed that the versions of the song "seem destined to create excitement aplenty," saying "Messers Rossi, Vance and Vale all turn in splendid readings on the lyrical, slow-shufflin' hauntingly melodic tale."

== Chart performance ==
Jerry Vale's version of "Dommage, Dommage (Too Bad, Too Bad)" debuted on Billboard magazine's pop-oriented Hot 100 chart in the issue dated October 8, peaking at number 93 during a two-week run on it. The single reached a lower No. 113 on the Cashbox Looking Ahead and Record World Singles Coming Up. It became a top-10 single on America's Billboard Easy Listening chart, rising to the number 5 position. "Dommage, Dommage" became Vale's second biggest Easy Listening hit at that point, and the final Hot 100 entry of his career.

Paul Vance's version reached a similar position of No. 97 on the Billboard Hot 100. On the chart published by Record World it only reached No. 107 and on the Cashbox chart it reached No. 108. Unlike Vale's version though, it completely missed the Easy Listening chart.

== Charts ==
Chart performance for "Dommage, Dommage (Too Bad, Too Bad)" by Jerry Vale
Chart (1966)	Peak position
US Billboard Hot 100	93
US Billboard Easy Listening	5
US Cashbox Looking Ahead	113
US Record World Singles Coming Up	109

Chart performance for "Dommage, Dommage (Too Bad, Too Bad)" by Paul Vance
Chart (1966)	Peak position
US Billboard Hot 100	97
US Cashbox Looking Ahead	108
US Record World Singles Coming Up	107
