= The Cuff Links =

American rock/pop studio group

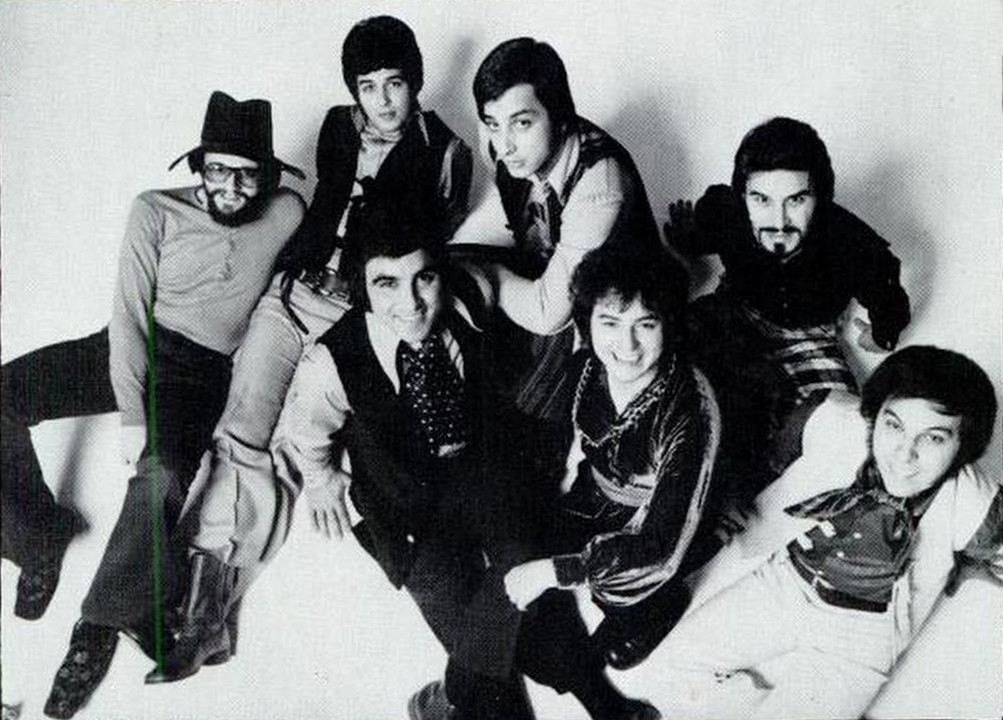
The Cuff Links, c. 1970

The Cuff Links (also known as Cufflinks) were an American rock/pop studio group from Staten Island, New York, United States. The ostensible band had a US No. 9 hit in 1969 with "Tracy", with rich harmonized vocals provided entirely by Ron Dante. The track was produced as part of a series of recording sessions – sometimes as many as six in a day – by Dante, with the songs released under a variety of band names. Dante left the act after their first album; on later singles vocals were provided by Joey Cord and/or Rupert Holmes.

== History ==
The Cuff Links were a creation of Paul Vance and Lee Pockriss, who wrote and produced the group's material, hired musicians to sing and play it, and controlled the group's name. Previous Vance/Pockriss credits included writing the hits "Catch a Falling Star" (1958) and "Itsy Bitsy Teenie Weenie Yellow Polkadot Bikini" (1960). As well, in 1964 they wrote and produced the top 20 hit "Leader of the Laundromat" by The Detergents; one of the Detergents was Ron Dante.

By the late 1960s, Vance and Pockriss were experimenting with creating studio groups. In 1969, they had hired Dante to sing lead on singles for the ostensible 'groups' The Two Dollar Question (who issued "Aunt Mathilda's Double Yummy Blow Your Mind Out Brownies" in May) and Abrahamm And Strauss (whose "Lay A Little Love On Me" appeared the same month.) Neither single charted, but undaunted, Vance and Pockriss tried again, hiring Dante to sing on a new single called "Tracy", credited to yet another phantom group, The Cuff Links.

"Tracy" was issued in July 1969, and was an immediate hit. The song reached the Top Ten of the Billboard Hot 100 in October 1969, just as "Sugar, Sugar," a single for The Archies and the product of another anonymous recording session by Dante, was descending from the no. 1 spot. Dante's vocals for "Tracy" were recorded in just hours. He recalled: "I put on a lead voice, doubled it a few times, and then put about 16, 18 backgrounds." "Tracy" spent 12 weeks in the U.S. chart, and subsequently sold over one million copies, being awarded a gold record by the R.I.A.A. In Canada the song reached No. 1 on November 8, 1969.

Dante had promised Vance and Pockriss that if the song was a hit he would record an entire Cuff Links album; when it charted, Vance and Pockriss quickly delved through their catalogue to produce more songs. "It was the quickest album I'd ever done," Dante remarked. "I think I did the entire background vocals and leads in a day and a half – for the entire album. I remember doing at least four or five songs in one day." To speed the project, Vance and Pockriss hired novice arranger Rupert Holmes to work on the album, which was also titled Tracy and included the second hit, "When Julie Comes Around," which peaked at No. 41 in the U.S. Billboard Hot 100, No. 10 in the UK Singles Chart, and No. 24 in Canada. The album liner notes wove a tale of how Vance and Pockriss discovered the "seven-member" group (which according to the same notes later swelled to a nine-person group), but did not name any group members, or show any pictures of the supposed band. Instead, the album featured an unnamed cover model.

As the album was being completed, Vance and Pockriss created a seven-member touring band, comprising Pat Rizzo (saxophone), Rich Dimino (keyboards), Bob Gill (trumpet/flugelhorn/flute), Dave Lavender (guitar), Andrew "Junior" Denno (bass), Joe Cord (vocals) and Danny Valentine (drums).

Dante opted not to tour or further record with the group, having accepted a solo album recording contract by Archies creator Don Kirshner that excluded any more outside work. When he called Vance to obtain his royalties for the first album, Vance refused to pay up unless Dante recorded a second album. The dispute was settled only after a personal confrontation at Vance's office.

For the second Cuff Links album, Vance and Pockriss remained as producers, and vocals were split between Joey Cord and Rupert Holmes. "Run Sally Run," the album's first single, was the third and last Cuff Links single to reach the Billboard Hot 100, peaking at No. 76 in April 1970 and number 40 in Canada. Follow-up single "Robin's World" appeared on the Billboard Easy Listening Top 40 the following June. Cord's vocals appeared on only a few tracks on the second Cuff Links album, The Cuff Links, with most songs featuring Holmes. Meanwhile, the album's liner notes once again talked about the Cuff Links as a nine-member group, though only seven people were pictured on the album cover, and none of the supposed group members were identified by name anywhere on the album.

The Cuff Links issued a final non-LP (and non-charting) single for Decca in 1971, titled "All Because Of You." The Cuff Links name was later revived for unsuccessful singles on the Atco and Roulette labels in 1972 and 1975. Both sides of every Cuff Links single were written and produced by Vance and Pockriss.

In 1999, singer-songwriter Michael "Valentine" Ubriaco obtained the touring rights to the Cuff Links name, and revived the group for live performances. That band included original guitarist Dave Lavender and still went on tours as of July 2016. Other groups have used the same name going back to the late 1950s.

== Discography ==
=== Singles ===
US Release Date	A-Side	Label & Cat No.	Chart Positions				Album
US Release Date	A-Side	Label & Cat No.	US Hot 100	Australia	Canada	UK	Album
July 1969	"Tracy"	Decca 32533	9	9	1	4	Tracy
November 1969	"When Julie Comes Around"	Decca 32592	41	13	24	10	Tracy
February 1970	"Run Sally Run"	Decca 32639	76	23	40	–	The Cuff Links
May 1970	"Robin's World"	Decca 32687	–	45	–	–	The Cuff Links
October 1970	"Thank You Pretty Baby"	Decca 32732	–	–	–	–	The Cuff Links
February 1971	"All Because Of You"	Decca 32791	–	–	–	–	Non-LP singles
January 1972	"Sandi"	Atco 6867	–	–	–	–	Non-LP singles
June 1975	"Some Girls Do (Some Girls Don't)"	Roulette 7171	–	–	–	–	Non-LP singles

=== Albums ===
- Tracy (Decca, 1969) (No. 133 US, No. 48 Canada)

"Tracy" / "All the Young Women" / "Heather" / "Early in the Morning" / "Put a Little Love in Your Heart" / "Lay a Little Love On Me" / "When Julie Comes Around" / "I Remember" / "Sweet Caroline" / "Where Did You Go?" / "Sally Ann (You're Such a Pretty Baby)"

- The Cuff Links (Decca, 1970)

"Robin's World" / "Thank You Pretty Baby" / "Jennifer Tomkins" / "Down in Louisiana" / "Mister Big (Oh What a Beautiful Day)" / "The Kiss" / "Foundation of Love" / "Bobbie" / "Love Grows (Where My Rosemary Goes)" / "Run Sally Run" / "Afraid of Tomorrow"
