= Ron Dante =

American musician, songwriter, record producer (born 1945)

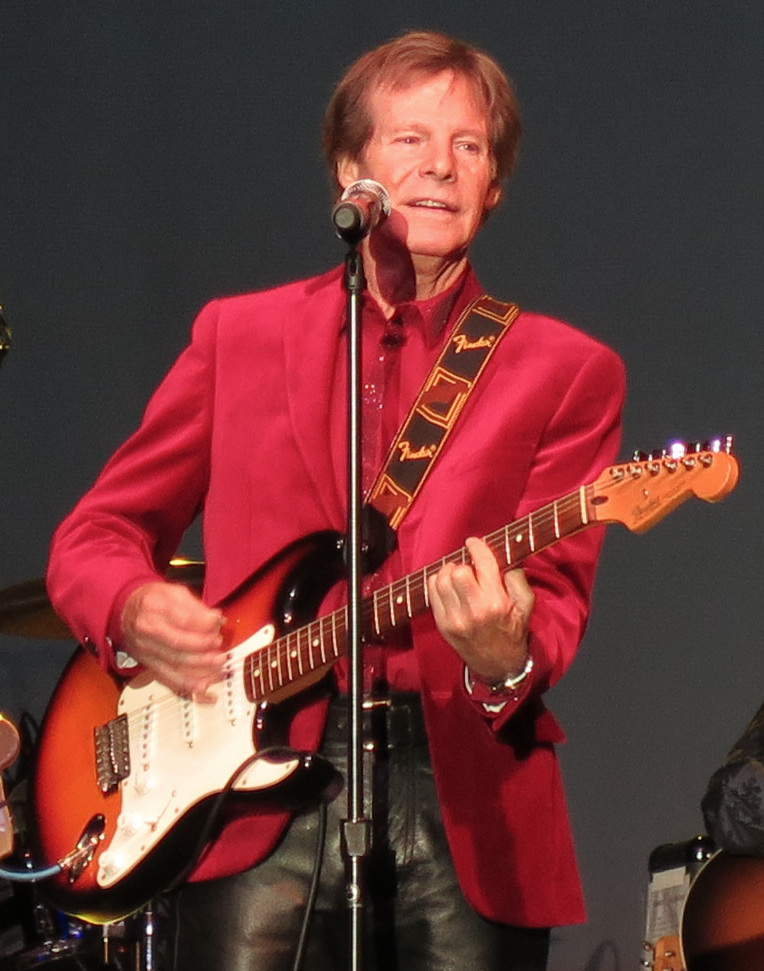
- Dante performing in 2017

Background information
- Also known as: Ronnie Dante, C. G. Rose, Bo Cooper, Ronnie And The Dirt Riders, Dante's Inferno
- Born: Carmine John Granito; August 22, 1945 (age 81); Staten Island, New York, United States
- Genre: Pop
- Occupations: Singer, songwriter, record producer, session musician
- Instruments: Vocals, guitar
- Years active: 1960s–present
- Formerly of: The Detergents, The Cuff Links, The Archies

Carmine John Granito (born August 22, 1945), known professionally as Ron Dante, is an American singer, songwriter and record producer. Dante is best known as the real-life lead singer of the fictional cartoon band the Archies; he was also the vocalist of the Cuff Links, The Turtles (in 2018) and co-produced Barry Manilow's first nine albums.

Dante was born Carmine John Granito to an Italian-American family in Staten Island, New York, United States.

== Career ==
=== The Detergents ===
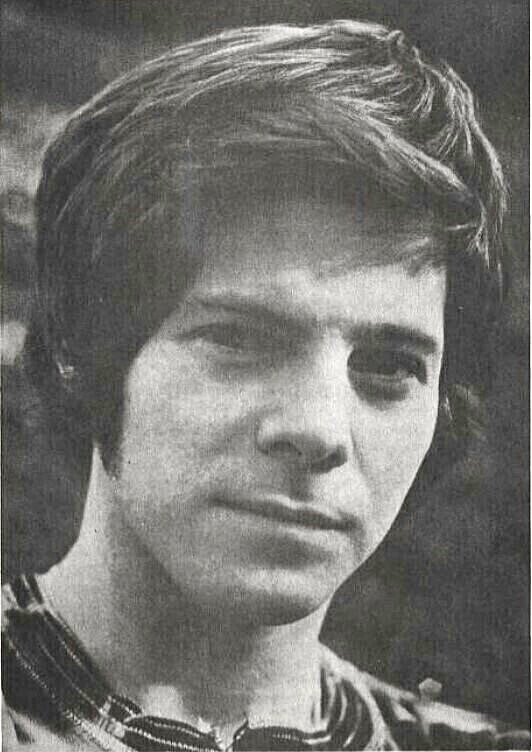
Dante featured in the November 1970 issue of Hit Parader magazine

Dante was a member of the parody group the Detergents around 1965. The group recorded a novelty song called "Leader of the Laundromat", although Dante was not on that recording.

=== The Archies ===
He became lead singer of the fictional cartoon band The Archies, whose single "Sugar, Sugar", written and composed by producer Jeff Barry with Andy Kim, was the number-one selling record of 1969 in the United States. Concurrent with his work on the Archies project, Dante was also employed as a session singer and performed many television and commercial jingles.

=== The Cuff Links ===
In 1969, Dante recorded an album under the group name of the Cuff Links – a collaboration with Detergents songwriter-producers Paul Vance and Lee Pockriss. He provided both lead and background vocals through overdubbing, as he did with most of the male Archies vocals. For three weeks in October 1969, Dante had two hits in the Top Ten of Billboard's Hot 100: both the Cuff Links' "Tracy" and, on its way down from number one, the Archies' "Sugar, Sugar", though neither single's label credited the anonymous studio singer. Dante's extensive vocal range includes falsetto, as used in "Jingle Jangle", the Archies' Top Ten follow-up to "Sugar, Sugar".

=== Solo recordings ===
Dante's first album release under his own name, which he recorded on Don Kirshner's label, was Ron Dante Brings You Up in 1970. In 1972, also under the supervision of Kirshner, Dante became lead vocalist for another cartoon group, the Chan Clan. He provided lead vocals for a number of songs on the 1972 album, Spiderman : From Beyond the Grave, A Rockcomic credited to the Webspinners. Dante appeared on a 1975 CBS TV pilot show called Hip Patches. He is interviewed by a group of young musicians in a band named Silvermoon who were meant to be the stars of the show. On that show, he is introduced as the voice of "all five Archies" and explains to the audience what it takes to be a successful band.

In 1979, he recorded a disco album under the name Dante's Inferno for the Infinity Records label, and in 1981 his second solo album Street Angel was released. Also in 1979, Dante performed the theme to the NBC television series $weepstake$: "Don't Be Afraid To Dream", whose lyrics were written by Norman Gimbel with music composed by Charles Fox.

=== Record producer ===
From 1973 to 1981, Dante was the record producer for singer Barry Manilow, and often sang backup on Manilow's recordings, including his 1974 No. 1 single "Mandy". Dante continued to record sporadically during those years; in 1975, with Manilow as the producer, Dante released a dance version of "Sugar, Sugar" under his own name. And that same year, under the moniker "Bo Cooper", he released "Don't Call it Love". Then in 1976, as Ronnie and the Dirt Riders, he released the Manilow-produced single "Yellow Van", which peaked at 111 on the Cashbox singles chart. In 1978, Dante produced the Tony Award-winning musical revue, Ain't Misbehavin', on Broadway. During this period, Dante, who was a Manhattan neighbor of George Plimpton, was invited to serve as the publisher of the Paris Review, as whose publisher he served from 1978 to 1985.

=== Other work ===
In 1982, Dante sang the theme song for the NBC sitcom Silver Spoons, "Together".

An album, Favorites, was released in 1999, and another CD, Saturday Night Blast, was issued in 2004. The extended play California Weekend CD was released in 2006.

Dante appeared with the CBS Orchestra on the Late Show with David Letterman on July 28, 2010.

In mid-2018, Dante joined the Happy Together tour, filling in for the Turtles' Howard Kaylan, who was sidelined owing to health problems.

As of 2026, Dante continues to perform in the "Happy Together Tour".

== See also ==
- Tony Burrows
- Joey Levine
- The Archie Show
