= When Julie Comes Around =

1969 single by the Cuff Links

Single by The Cuff Links

from the album Tracy
- B-side: "Sally Ann (You're Such a Pretty Baby"
- Released: November 1969
- Genre: Bubblegum pop
- Length: 2:44
- Label: Decca
- Songwriters: Lee Pockriss; Paul Vance
- Producers: Lee Pockriss; Paul Vance

The Cuff Links singles chronology
"Tracy" (1969)	"When Julie Comes Around" (1969)	"Run Sally Run" (1970)

"When Julie Comes Around" is a song written by Lee Pockriss and Paul Vance. It was first released as "When Joey Comes Around" by Tasha Thomas in July 1969, and produced by Pockriss and Vance in a slightly soul-ish arrangement. This version failed to chart. The song is best known for the version by the Cuff Links, also produced by Pockriss and Vance in a different pop-oriented arrangement (with strings arranged by Rupert Holmes). Released in November 1969, the Cuff Links' recording of the song peaked at number 41 on the US Billboard Hot 100 and number 10 on the UK Singles Chart.

== Release and reception ==
The Cuff Links released "When Julie Comes Around" as the follow-up to their international debut hit "Tracy". Featuring Ron Dante on multi-tracked vocals, it was released with the B-side "Sally Ann (You're Such a Pretty Baby)", also written by Pockriss and Vance. Despite being released in North America in November 1969, the single was not released in the Europe until February 1970.

In Cash Box, it was described as "a glittery ballad enhanced by non-intrusive rhythmic electricity and a catchy production flavoring to spice up the overall action". Billboard wrote that "this powerful follow-up is sure to repeat its success".

== Track listing ==
7": Decca / 732592

1. "When Julie Comes Around" – 2:44
2. "Sally Ann (You're Such a Pretty Baby)" – 2:46

== Chart performance ==
Chart (1969–70)	Peak position
Australia (Go-Set)	12
Australia (Kent Music Report)	13
Canada Top Singles (RPM)	24
Canada Adult Contemporary (RPM)	20
Ireland (IRMA)	13
New Zealand (Listener)	20
South Africa (Springbok Radio)	6
UK Singles (Official Charts)	10
US Billboard Hot 100	41
US Easy Listening (Billboard)	30
US Cashbox Top 100	31
