= Playground in My Mind =

1972 single written by Vance & Pockriss

Single by Clint Holmes

from the album Playground in My Mind
- B-side: "There's No Future in My Future"
- Released: 21 June 1972
- Recorded: 1972
- Genre: Pop
- Length: 2:55
- Label: Epic
- Songwriters: Paul Vance, Lee Pockriss
- Producers: Paul Vance, Lee Pockriss

"Playground in My Mind" is a 1972 single by Clint Holmes. It was written by Paul Vance with Lee Pockriss, and is a nursery rhyme-styled song which features a duet with record producer Vance's seven-year-old son Philip, who sang on the chorus, as Michael.

== Background ==
"Playground in My Mind" had first been recorded by Billy Lawrence (II) in 1971 as "Playground In My Mind (Mama, Je T'aime)" on Atlantic Records, but failed to chart. Holmes' better known version was released in the U.S. in June 1972 but did not reach the Hot 100 chart until 24 March 1973, whereupon it rose to #2 on 16–23 June 1973, behind "My Love" by Paul McCartney and Wings. The single stayed on the chart for 23 weeks. The song was granted gold disc status by the R.I.A.A. on 3 July 1973.

The release went one better in Canada, topping the RPM 100 national singles charts there for three consecutive weeks in the same year (23 June - 7 July). On the Canadian Adult Contemporary chart, "Playground in My Mind" reached #1.

The following account was given in the autobiography, Johnny Holliday: From Rock to Jock:

I also helped break a record at WWDC. It was a tune called "Playground of My Mind," written by Paul Vance, whom I had known from my WINS days in the Big Apple. Clint Holmes, an excellent talent just waiting to be discovered, recorded it. Clint had found his local audience at Mr. Day's in Georgetown and various other D.C. nightspots. When Clint's record promoter dropped the single off at WWDC, we just jumped all over it. It became a hit overnight.

== Chart history ==
=== Weekly charts ===
Chart (1973)	Peak position
Australian (Kent Music Report)	66
Canada RPM Top Singles	1
Canada RPM Adult Contemporary	1
New Zealand (Listener)	1
US Billboard Hot 100	2
US Billboard Adult Contemporary	7
US Cash Box Top 100	2

=== Year-end charts ===
Chart (1973)	Rank
Canada RPM Top Singles	3
US Billboard Hot 100	12
US Cash Box Top 100	8

== Cover versions ==
- Lee Pockriss covered "Playground in My Mind" in 1972.
- Johnny Ashcroft covered the song in 1973. It was released in Australia and became a hit, reaching #19.
- Stein Ingebrigtsen and Anne Mette Torp recorded the song in Norwegian in 1973, under the title "I barnas verden" ("In the children's world").

== See also ==
- List of 1970s one-hit wonders in the United States
