= Foolish Heart =

Foolish Heart may refer to:

- "Foolish Heart" (Steve Perry song), 1984
- "Foolish Heart" (Grateful Dead song), 1989
- Foolish Heart (film), a 1998 film
- Foolish Heart (TV series), a 1999 Canadian TV series
- The Foolish Heart, a 1919 German silent film directed by Erik Lund
- "Foolish Heart", a 2017 song by Nikki Lane from the album Highway Queen

== See also ==
- My Foolish Heart (disambiguation)
