= Magic Moments =

Single by Perry Como
- A-side: "Catch a Falling Star"
- B-side: "Magic Moments"
- Released: 1957
- Recorded: 1957
- Genre: Swing
- Length: 2:41
- Label: RCA Victor
- Songwriters: Burt Bacharach; Hal David
- Producer: Joe Reisman

Perry Como singles chronology
"Jingle Bells" (1957)	"Magic Moments" (1957)	"Kewpie Doll" (1958)

"Magic Moments" is a popular song composed by Burt Bacharach and written by Hal David, being one of the first songwriting collaborations by that duo. The song was released in 1957 by Perry Como as the B-side of his "Catch a Falling Star", and reached No. 1 in the UK in 1958.

== Background ==
In his 2003 book Burt Bacharach, Song by Song, Serene Dominic comments:

Combined with the quizzical bassoon, the whistling and the ghastly white shadings of the Ray Charles Singers, these distant recollections must seem like occurrences on another planet to later generations.

== Chart performance ==
The biggest hit version of the song was recorded by Perry Como and released by RCA Victor in December 1957, becoming a hit early in 1958. The record was produced by Joe Reisman. Its peak position in the United States is hard to track precisely, due to the multiple charts used in Billboard magazine but, on the Most Played by Disc Jockeys chart, it peaked at number four.

The song was also a 1958 hit in Italy and, in the United Kingdom, it spent eight weeks at number one in the UK Singles Chart, becoming Como's biggest UK hit.

In Canada, the song reached number 12 on the CHUM Charts on February 3, 1958, co-charting with Catch a Falling Star.

== Other recordings ==
- A less successful UK cover version recorded by Ronnie Hilton reached No. 22 on the UK Singles Chart, in 1958. Hilton's version included some different lyrics from the original.
- Bing Crosby recorded the song in 1958 for use on his radio show and it was subsequently included in the album With All My Heart (2012).
- Amanda Lear recorded this song for her 1985 EP A L.
- Synthpop duo Erasure recorded the song for their 1997 album Cowboy.

== Other uses ==
- Magic Moments is also the name given to a Surprise, Surprise style show within the BBC television film Pat and Margaret. Its theme music is the song itself and as the coach carrying various members of the audience sets off at the start of the film, they start singing it.
- This song was used in the television commercial for Quality Street, a confectionery brand in the UK in the 1980s and continues to be used each year for the brand's Christmas advertisements.
- The Perry Como version is featured in the 1998 film Fear and Loathing in Las Vegas, when Raoul arrives at a Vegas hotel where Dr. Gonzo is located, briefly in Alex Holeh Ahavah (1986), Dogma (1999), Police Academy (1984), Two Weeks Notice (2002), Bridget Jones: The Edge of Reason (2004), The Hitchhiker's Guide to the Galaxy (2005), Episode 3 of the first season of the 2012 BBC series Call the Midwife, which is set in 1957, and episode 9 of the 2017 Netflix series Glow.
- The song was also used as background music for a segment on the 1998 HBO miniseries From the Earth to the Moon featuring a meeting of NASA Astronaut Group 2 – The New Nine – all of whom booked into The Rice Hotel in Houston, Texas, with the code name "Max Peck".
- The Erasure recording is featured in the Clive Barker film Lord of Illusions, providing the background music to a magicians' convention.
