= The Detergents =

American music group specializing in parody songs

The Detergents were an American music group consisting of Ronnie (Ron) Dante, Danny Jordan, and Tommy Wynn. The group's specialty was parody songs, as with their first and best-known single, "Leader of the Laundromat". A spoof of the Shangri-Las' then-current hit song "Leader of the Pack", "Leader of the Laundromat" became a hit in its own right, reaching the top 20 on the Billboard Hot 100 chart in early 1965.

== "Leader of the Laundromat" ==
In 1965, the group released "Leader of the Laundromat," a parody of the Shangri-Las' "Leader of the Pack." It was written and produced by Paul Vance and Lee Pockriss. The song became a top 20 hit in the US, peaking at number 19 on the Billboard Hot 100 in January 1965.

The lead vocal on "Leader of the Laundromat" was performed by Danny Jordan, who was Paul Vance's nephew. Jordan had released a 1960 single on Kapp Records' Leader label, "Just Couldn't Resist Her With Her Pocket Transistor" (written by Jack Keller and Larry Kolber), a disc highly reminiscent of the then-recent "Itsy Bitsy Teenie Weenie Yellow Polka Dot Bikini" by Leader artist Brian Hyland and, like that number 1 hit, produced by Vance. Vance also produced a 1962 collaboration between Jordan and Artie Wayne: "Find a Little Happiness", a Diamond Records release credited to Jordan and Wayne.

By 1964, Dante, Jordan and Wynn were all staff writers and session singers for Aldon Music, the music publishing company that had been founded by Don Kirshner and Al Nevins. That year the three eighteen-year-olds had collaborated in writing the Ronnie Dante single "Little Lollypop," and as the Cabin Kids the trio were recording surf music style songs for planned release on the Screen Gems label, when Vance approached them to record "Leader of the Laundromat" as the Detergents.

The success of "Leader of the Laudromat" prompted the abandonment of the Cabin Kids in favor of the Detergents, and as such Dante, Jordan and Wynn appeared on several music-oriented television shows of the day, such as Shindig! and Hullabaloo, as well as touring with Dick Clark's Caravan of Stars. The group was active from 1964 until 1966.

After "Leader of the Laundromat" was released, the composers of "Leader of the Pack", Jeff Barry, Ellie Greenwich and George "Shadow" Morton, filed a lawsuit against the group. The suit was ultimately settled out of court. However, just three years later, in 1968, Dante began working alongside songwriter/producer Jeff Barry as the lead vocalist for the briefly, hugely successful cartoon group, The Archies.

== Later singles ==
The Detergents made a second and final appearance on the Billboard Hot 100 with "Double-O-Seven," a lament by a teenager whose girlfriend is neglecting him to see James Bond movies. The track reached number 89 in the spring of 1965.

The Detergents again spoofed the Shangri-Las by recording "I Can Never Eat Home Anymore," a parody of the Shangri-Las' hit "I Can Never Go Home Anymore".

Dante went on to produce many of Barry Manilow's hit recordings in the 1970s.

Jordan died in December 2024.
