= Dave Clark & Friends =

Studio album by The Dave Clark Five, Mike Smith
- Released: September 1972
- Genre: Pop rock, soul
- Length: 44:39
- Label: Columbia; SCX 6494
- Producer: Dave Clark

The Dave Clark Five UK chronology
The Dave Clark Five Play Good Old Rock & Roll (1971)	Dave Clark & Friends (1972)

Singles from Dave Clark & Friends
- 1. "Put a Little Love in Your Heart" / "34-06"; 2. "Bring It On Home to Me" (US only) / "Darling, I Love You"; 3. "Southern Man" / "If You Wanna See Me Cry"; 4. "Won't You Be My Lady" / "Into Your Life""

Dave Clark & Friends is the seventh British and final studio album by the Dave Clark Five, and partly a solo project by singer Mike Smith and producer Dave Clark. It contains the Dave Clark Five's 1969 UK Top 50 hit "Put a Little Love in Your Heart".

== Overview ==
The album was created to fulfill a contract between Dave Clark and EMI Records after the Dave Clark Five had already broken up. The LP therefore contains five tracks originally released under the band's name ("Southern Man", "Bring It On Home To Me", "Paradise", "Won't You Be My Lady", "Put A Little Love In Your Heart"). The others were recorded as a studio project with Eric Ford (bass guitar) and Blue Mink band members guitarist Alan Parker and backing vocalist Madeline Bell.

All the songs were sung by Mike Smith, who also composed half of the album. Dave Clark is listed as a co-writer of the songs, but it is generally believed that he was only involved in the production side. Although Mike Smith has dodged questions about whether Clark was involved as a writer, he confirmed in 2003 that he was not. The second part of the record contains cover versions of some successful songs such as "Southern Man" by Neil Young, "Bring It On Home To Me" by Sam Cooke, "Draggin' the Line" by Tommy James, "Signs" by Five Man Electrical Band and "(If Paradise Is) Half as Nice" (under the title "Paradise") by Amen Corner. The album was released in the UK, Germany, Japan and New Zealand. The previously released single "Put A Little Love In Your Heart" (originally by Jackie DeShannon) reached No. 31 in the UK chart.

Along with the UK album "5 By 5", this is the only album Dave Clark hasn't released in a remastered collection on Spotify in 2019.

== Reception ==
Professional ratings
Review scores
Source	Rating
AllMusic	2.5/5 stars

In his AllMusic retrospective review of the release, Richie Unterberger wrote, "There are too many run-of-the-mill covers in the circa 1970 mainstream rock style (...) Some of the other material sounds a little like the harder edge of early-'70s AM radio pop, though not attached to memorable songs."

== Track listing ==
Side one
No.	Title	Writer(s)	Length
1.	"Southern Man"	Neil Young	3:55
2.	"Bring It On Home To Me"	Sam Cooke	3:05
3.	"Signs"	Les Emmerson	2:46
4.	"Won't You Be My Lady"	Dave Clark, Mike Smith	2:24
5.	"The Time Has Come"	Dave Clark, Mike Smith	2:32
6.	"If You Got A Little Love To Give"	Jim McCarty	3:43
7.	"Officer McKirk"	Peter Moffit	5:46

Side two
No.	Title	Writer(s)	Length
1.	"Paradise"	Lucio Battisti, Jack Fishman	2:55
2.	"Draggin' the Line"	Tommy James, Bob King	2:42
3.	"Think Of Me"	Dave Clark, Mike Smith	2:49
4.	"One-Eyed, Blue-Suited, Gun-Totin’ Man"	Dave Clark, Mike Smith	2:48
5.	"Right Or Wrong"	Dave Clark, Mike Smith	2:23
6.	"I Don't Know"	Dave Clark, Mike Smith	3:09
7.	"Put A Little Love in Your Heart"	Jackie DeShannon, Jimmy Holiday, Randy Myers	2:56

== Personnel ==
The Dave Clark Five

- Dave Clark – drums, backing vocals
- Mike Smith – lead vocals, keyboards
- Lenny Davidson (1, 2, 4, 8, 14) – backing vocals, lead guitar
- Rick Huxley (1, 2, 4, 8, 14) – bass guitar
- Denis Payton (1, 2, 4, 8, 14) – tenor saxophone, rhythm guitar

Additional musicians

- Madeline Bell – backing vocals
- Alan Parker – guitar
- Eric Ford – bass guitar
