= My Foolish Heart =

My Foolish Heart may refer to:

- My Foolish Heart (1949 film), an American film starring Susan Hayward
- My Foolish Heart (2018 film), a Dutch biographical film
- "My Foolish Heart" (song), a 1949 popular song by Victor Young and Ned Washington, introduced in that movie
- My Foolish Heart (Don Friedman album), 2003
- My Foolish Heart (Keith Jarrett album), 2007
- My Foolish Heart (Ralph Towner album), 2017
- "My Foolish Heart", a song performed by Jazmine Sullivan on her album Fearless

== See also ==
- Foolish Heart (disambiguation)
