= Clint Holmes =

English singer (born 1946)

- Born: Clinton Raymond Holmes; 9 May 1946 (age 80); Bournemouth, England
- Occupations: Singer-songwriter; entertainer; TV host; TV announcer; game show host
- Instruments: Vocals

Clinton Raymond Holmes (born 9 May 1946) is a British-born singer-songwriter and Las Vegas entertainer, and TV announcer. He had a hit single in the US with "Playground in My Mind".

== Bio ==
He was born in Bournemouth, England, the son of an African-American jazz musician and an English opera singer. He was raised in Farnham, New York, a small village southwest of Buffalo.

Initially a vocal music student at Fredonia State College, Holmes left school for the U.S. Army during the Vietnam War. He spent his three-year enlistment (1967–1969) with the United States Army Chorus, and then remained in the Washington, D.C. area to launch his civilian career, singing in nightclubs.

== Recording career ==
In June 1972, Holmes released his only hit record, "Playground in My Mind". It didn't reach the Hot 100 chart until 24 March 1973, whereupon it rose to #2 on 16–23 June 1973. It became one of the biggest hits of the year internationally. A later single, "Shiddle-ee-dee", reached number 74 on the Canadian AC charts later in 1973. The album Playground in My Mind reached number 20 in Canada.

On July 3, 1973, Holmes was awarded a Gold Record for "Playground in My Mind" by the R.I.A.A.

The following account was given in the autobiography, Johnny Holliday: From Rock to Jock:

I also helped break a record at WWDC. It was a tune called 'Playground of My Mind,' written by Paul Vance, whom I had known from my WINS days in the Big Apple. Clint Holmes, an excellent talent just waiting to be discovered, recorded it. Clint had found his local audience at Mr. Day's in Georgetown and various other D.C. nightspots. When Clint's record promoter dropped the single off at WWDC, we just jumped all over it. It became a hit overnight. Clint is the sort of fellow you just automatically like the first time you meet him. He and I played tennis at Candy Cane Park in Silver Spring and shot a ton of hoops together. He's a good athlete. I couldn't be prouder of what Clint has accomplished in his career. After 'Playground' hit, he became Joan Rivers' sideman on her short-lived late night show on Fox, and then he got his own TV gig on WOR-TV in NYC.

== Performance career ==
While touring regularly since 1972, Holmes has had a series of residencies in major U.S. markets.

In 1999, Steve Wynn brought Clint Holmes to the Golden Nugget in Las Vegas for a 1-year deal. The deal was noteworthy in the fact that it offered Holmes a guaranteed fee, regardless of the number of tickets he sold.

On January 14, 2000, Clint Holmes opened a residency at Harrah's on the Las Vegas Strip. The show ran for six and a half years, totaling 1,872 shows.

Joined Jane McDonald in 2001 on stage at the MGM Grand and sang a duet 'You Have To Go Through Hell' 55mins into the video.

Since the opening of the Smith Center for the Performing Arts in 2012, Holmes performs regularly in Myron's at the Smith Center.

== Television ==
Starting on October 9, 1986, Holmes was the announcer for The Late Show Starring Joan Rivers (1986–1988), the initial broadcast offering of the then-new Fox Broadcasting Company.

In 1991 he hosted New York at Night, a talk show that aired on WWOR in New York City for a year and won a local Emmy.

From 1990 to 1995, he hosted Honda Campus All-Star Challenge on the BET network, and, after the event became non-broadcast, continued to host the final matches through 2008. Most of Holmes' Vegas band members also appear in a locally popular R&B/jazz group, Santa Fe and The Fat City Horns. He appeared on the cruise ship Gallaxy, as an entertainer also starring Jane McDonald.

Holmes has annually returned to Buffalo each March to co-host the annual Variety Kids telethon on WKBW-TV.

He performed "Auld Lang Syne" in the Smith Center in Las Vegas, following the New Year's celebration's firework show on January 1, 2016.

== See also ==
- List of 1970s one-hit wonders in the United States
