= Catch a Falling Star =

Single by Perry Como
- B-side: "Magic Moments"
- Released: December 3, 1957
- Recorded: October 9, 1957
- Genre: Pop
- Length: 2:23
- Label: RCA Victor
- Songwriters: Paul Vance and Lee Pockriss
- Producer: Joe Reisman

Perry Como singles chronology
| "Jingle Bells" (1957) | "Catch a Falling Star" (1957) | "Magic Moments" (1957) |

"Catch a Falling Star" is a song written by Paul Vance and Lee Pockriss. It was made famous by Perry Como who recorded and released his version in late 1957.

== Background and chart performance ==
The song's melody is similar to a theme heard in Brahms' Academic Festival Overture, the Fuchslied (Was kommt dort von der Höh). Perry Como's recording features the Ray Charles Singers, who sing the refrain as a repeated round.

It was Como's last number one hit in the United States, reaching number 1 on the Billboard "Most Played by Jockeys" chart, but not in the overall top 100, where it reached number 3. It was the first single to receive a Recording Industry Association of America gold record certification, on March 14, 1958. In Canada, the song reached number 12 on the CHUM Charts, February 3, 1958, co-charting with Magic Moments.

Internationally, in 1958, the song also topped the Australian charts. In the UK Singles Chart, "Catch a Falling Star" peaked at number nine, whereas its B-side "Magic Moments" topped the charts.

== Accolades ==
The single won Como the 1959 Grammy Award for Best Vocal Performance, Male.

== Certifications ==
| Region | Certification | Certified units/sales |
|---|---|---|
| United States (RIAA) | Gold | 1,000,000^{^} |
^{^} Shipments figures based on certification alone.
