= Sally (Gracie Fields song) =

Song by Gracie Fields
- A-side: "Fall In and Follow the Band"
- Released: 1931
- Label: His Master's Voice B3879
- Songwriters: Harry Leon, Leo Towers, Will Haines

"Sally" is a popular song written by Leo Towers, Harry Leon and Will E. Haines. It was first sung by Gracie Fields in the 1931 film Sally in Our Alley. "Sally" was released on His Master's Voice as the B-side of the record "Fall In and Follow the Band".

Merseybeat group The Koobas covered the song in 1967 and released it as a single on Columbia. Gerry Monroe scored a hit with the song in 1970 and it was also released by Karl Denver in 1966. Paul McCartney covered the song during a soundcheck at Wembley on his 1990 world tour; the song was released on the live album Tripping the Live Fantastic. Jeff Lynne covered it as part of the session for his 2012 album Long Wave, but the recording was not released on the album.

== Background ==
The tune was composed by pianist Harry Leon (born Aaron Sugarman; 18 August 1901–18 February 1970), a Jewish musician from the East End of London, who played in pubs in Denmark Street. His friend Leo Towers (originally Leonard Blitz) wrote a lyric, and they took the song, initially called "Gypsy Sweetheart", to music publisher Will Haines of Cameo Music.

Haines wanted the lyric to include a girl's name, and Leon and Towers revised the words to include "Sally", which was the nickname of Leo Towers’ sister Sarah. Leon did not think the song would be successful, and sold his share in the song for £30.

Whilst backstage at The Metropolitan, Fields described: "In comes this fellow one night, very Cockney, and he tells us all of this song he’s just written with some friends. The title of the song was 'Sally'." The name "Sally" surprised Fields, as the title of her upcoming film, Sally in our Alley, had not yet been released to the public. After a little work and an audition for Archie Pitt, it was agreed the song would be used in the film.

"Sally" became the star vehicle of Fields' film, appearing throughout the film over six times including being played in the background by an orchestra, whistled by dockyard workers, and sung twice by Fields.
