= Gerry Monroe =

English pop singer

Gerry Monroe (20 January 1933 – October 1989) was an English pop singer, who enjoyed brief popularity in the early 1970s.

Born Henry Morris in South Shields, County Durham, England, Monroe scored five Top 40 hits on the UK Singles Chart in 1970-71. A former colliery worker, he was spotted on Hughie Green's Opportunity Knocks TV show by Les Reed, who signed him to a long-term deal with Chapter One Records. He had a high and distinctive falsetto voice, and managed to notch up chart hits for the Chapter One label, including "Sally", a song first made popular by Gracie Fields in the 1930s. Monroe's version was co-produced and co-arranged by Reed. In 1997 an album, Sally: Pride of Our Alley, was released on compact disc on the Gold Dust label. Monroe also recorded a tribute to Bobby Charlton in 1973, following the footballer's retirement, called "Goodbye Bobby Boy".

Monroe died in October 1989 at the age of 56.

== Discography ==
=== Albums ===
Title	Album details
Sally – Pride of Our Alley	Released: December 1970; Label: Chapter 1; Formats: LP
Gerry Monroe	Released: 1971; Label: Chapter 1
Bring Back the Good Times	Released: December 1972; Label: Chapter 1
The World of Gerry Monroe	Released: April 1975; Label: Decca

=== Singles ===
Title	Year	Peak chart positions							Albums
Title	Year	UK	AUS	BE (FLA)	BE (WA)	GER	IRE	SA	Albums
"Sally"	1970	4	83 (Note: "Sally" and "Little Drops of Silver" charted as a double A-sided single in 1971.)	19	—	40	14	4	Sally – Pride of Our Alley
"Cry"	1970	38	—	—	—	—	—	—	Sally – Pride of Our Alley
"My Prayer"	1970	9	—	—	—	—	—	—	Sally – Pride of Our Alley
"It's a Sin to Tell a Lie"	1971	13	5	—	49	—	—	—	Gerry Monroe
"Little Drops of Silver"	1971	37	83	—	—	—	—	—	Gerry Monroe
"Girl of My Dreams"	1972	43	—	—	—	—	—	—	Bring Back the Good Times
"Bring Back the Good Times"	1972	—	60	—	—	—	—	—	Bring Back the Good Times
"Goodbye, Bobby Boy"	1973	52 (Note: Chart position is from the "Breakers List", which was an officially published BRMB list of the most popular records in the UK outside of the top 50.)	—	—	—	—	—	—	Non-album singles
"Reconsider Me"	1975	—	—	—	—	—	—	—	Non-album singles
"—" denotes releases that did not chart or were not released in that territory.

== See also ==
- List of Top 25 singles for 1971 in Australia
