= Tracy (The Cuff Links song) =

Single by The Cuff Links

from the album Tracy
- B-side: "Where Do You Go?"
- Released: July 1969
- Genre: Bubblegum pop; pop rock
- Length: 2:05
- Label: Decca
- Songwriters: Lee Pockriss & Paul Vance
- Producers: Lee Pockriss & Paul Vance

The Cuff Links singles chronology
"Tracy" (1969)	"When Julie Comes Around" (1969)

"Tracy" is a song written by Lee Pockriss and Paul Vance, the title track of the Cuff Links debut LP.

== Background ==
The single was released in 1969 by The Cuff Links and featured Ron Dante on vocals. Dante recalled recording the vocals for "Tracy" stating, "I put on a lead voice, doubled it a few times, and then put about 16, 18 backgrounds."

== Chart performance ==
The song spent 12 weeks on the Billboard Hot 100 chart, peaking at No. 9, while reaching No. 5 on Billboard's Easy Listening chart, No. 4 on Record World's "100 Top Pops", No. 5 on the Cash Box Top 100, No. 1 on Canada's RPM 100, No. 4 on the UK Singles Chart, No. 4 on New Zealand's NZ Listener chart, and No. 9 on Australia's Go-Set chart.

=== Weekly singles charts ===
Chart (1969)	Peak position
Argentina (Escalera a la Fama)	10
Australia - Go-Set	9
Belgium (Wallonia)	48
Canada - RPM 100	1
Canada - RPM Adult Contemporary	3
Israel (Galei Zahal)	8
New Zealand - NZ Listener	4
South Africa (Springbok Radio)	7
UK Singles Chart	4
US Billboard Hot 100	9
US Billboard Easy Listening	5
US Cash Box Top 100	5
US Record World 100 Top Pops	4
US Record World Top Non-Rock	4

=== Year-end charts ===
Chart (1969)	Rank
Canada RPM's 100 Hits of 1969	38
US Billboard Top Easy Listening Singles	49
US Billboard Top Hot 100 Singles	81
US Cash Box Top 100 Chart Hits	69
