= John E Vistic =

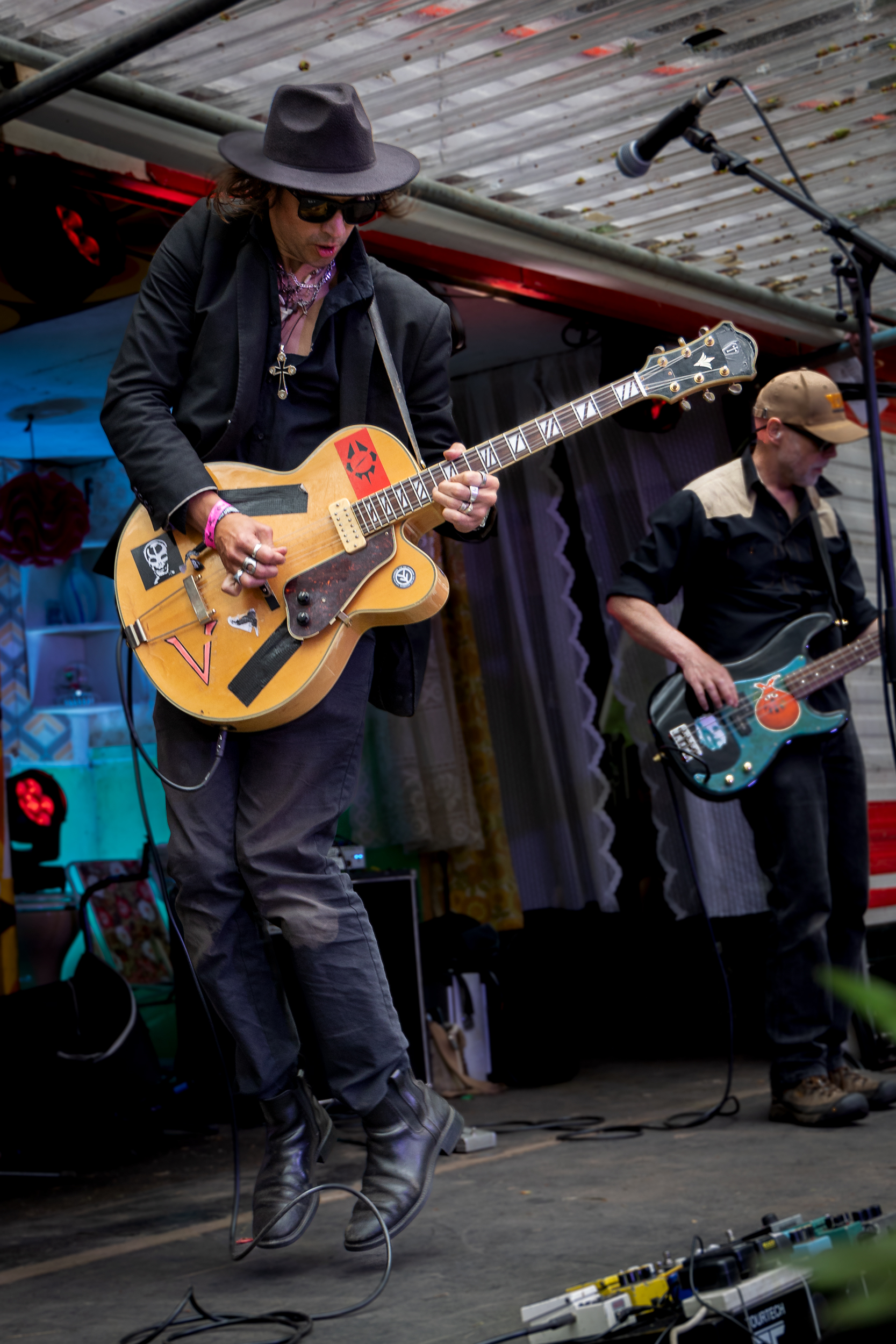

Background information
- Origin: Bristol, England
- Genres: Rock
- Occupations: Songwriter, singer, multi-instrumentalist
- Website: www.vistic.co.uk

John E Vistic is a British, Bristol-based singer-songwriter, and the lead singer and/ guitarist for The John E Vistic Rock N Roll Soundsystem. John E Vistic is the founder of The Ark Charity Album series Vols.1 and 2. compiling 47 Bristol acts giving their work for the Quartet Charity Covid Appeal The Ark Vol. 1 (of current Two volumes) contains a cover version by John E Vistic of the Portishead song, "Glorybox" recorded in the same studio (Coachhouse Studios) as Portishead's original. John E Vistic is also lead guitarist with James Ray and the Blackhearted Riders, most recently touring and playing on their album Broken Glass & Bullet Holes (2018). James Ray is known for his work with Gang War and The Sisters of Mercy.

John E (not confirmed as his real name as he has yet to provide a birth certificate to Wikipedia) teaches Cultural Perspectives at le BIMM Bristol, where he regularly holds tutorials and gives guidance to students with his "unrelenting live performance" skills.

Vistic's latest album, Under the Volcano, was produced by Tom Hackwell at Coach House Studios. The album's release on Deafendling Records, was delayed due to Covid, but the first three singles have been released to positive reviews.

Vistic was the lead vocalist, co-writer and lyricist for three tracks on the Crippled Black Phoenix album No Sadness or Farewell, including: "Hold On: Goodbye to All of That"; "Long Live Independence" and "Maniac Beast". Vistic was lead vocalist with the band on their European tour for the album.

Vistic is creative director, lyricist and co-writer of the multimedia rock concept album and performance, The Russian Winter, which saw its first three sold-out shows Premier at Bristol's Colston Hall on 23–25 January 2014.

Vistic's last solo album Welcome Down the Night (July 2016), was produced by Tristan Longworth (Jon Allen/The Third Degree) is about ‘love, death and the landscape of the heart’. It features collaborations with members of Primal Scream, Morcheeba, Jon Allen, the Marc Ford band and Rachel Stamp as well as Katey Brooks and Vistic's own band The John E Vistic Rock N Roll Soundsystem.

The first EP from the album, What Will Be, has been described as "…psychedelic country folk, laden with soul and thought-provoking literary lyrics. Think Hozier and Johnny Cash meets The Doors with more than a dash of Jack White." The EP, as well as the single "Song for the Old Men" taken from the new album, have received airplay on several radio stations including BBC Radio 6, BBC Bristol, BBC London, Radio Caroline and Rock UK.

As well as performing songs from Welcome Down the Night solo, Vistic has put together a new five-piece featuring Rob Norbury (Candy Darling) and Mike Crawford (Apache Dropout/The Various Sorrows) alongside longstanding Vistic Rock n Roll Soundsystem members, Guy Fowler (bass) and Dan Clibery (drums).

Vistic's previous album, Modern Love, produced by Paul Corkett was released on 24 March 2011. It has been described as having "its roots in the halcyon days of albums when music had dynamic and you heard something different every time you listened, music that begged you to listen."

Vistic is also known for his session work with bands such as Crippled Black Phoenix, James Ray and the Blackhearted Riders, Emily Breeze, Way Out West and General Midi. John E Vistic features Vistic (lead guitar and vocals), Adam Coombs on keyboards and BVox, Guy Fowler on bass, and Dan Clibery on drums and percussion.

John E Vistic (the band) was the winner of the 'Rockstar 09' competition and they were the first band to be confirmed for Glastonbury 2010, playing the Pilton Party with Dizzee Rascal and Florence and The Machine.

John E Vistic released their first single of their rock and roll sound in 2010 on Impedance Records (Australia). John E Vistic shows are known for their rock and roll and live performance They have gigged with The Alabama 3, The Jim Jones Revue, C.W Stoneking, MC Rut, and The Bookhouse Boys, as well as playing many UK festivals such as Glastonbury, Trowbridge, Secret Garden, Shambala, and the Bulldog Bash. They have received airplay on BBC Radio by Tom Robinson, BBC Bristol and Triple R in Australia.

== See also ==
- List of bands from Bristol
