= Paul Vance =

American songwriter and record producer (1929–2022)

- Born: Joseph Paul Florio; November 4, 1929; Brooklyn, New York, U.S.
- Died: May 30, 2022 (aged 92) West Palm Beach, Florida, U.S.
- Genres: Pop, novelty songs
- Occupations: Songwriter, record producer
- Label: Columbia Records

Joseph Paul Florio (November 4, 1929 – May 30, 2022), known professionally as Paul Vance, was an American songwriter and record producer, primarily from the 1950s until the 1970s.

His most successful song compositions, all written with Lee Pockriss, included "Catch a Falling Star", "Itsy Bitsy Teenie Weenie Yellow Polkadot Bikini", and "Tracy".

== Career ==
He was born Joseph Paul Florio in Brooklyn, New York, United States on November 4, 1929. He started writing song lyrics in his early teens, before serving with the U.S. Army at Fort Leavenworth, Kansas.

After opening an auto salvage business in his twenties, he met composer Lee Pockriss, and the pair started writing together. Pockriss described their working relationship as ideal - "He [Vance] understands the public, I understand the profession". They co-wrote the hit song "Catch a Falling Star," recorded in 1957 by Perry Como, which topped Billboard's "Most Played By Jockeys" chart. It became one of Como's signature songs, and was the first gold record certified by the Recording Industry Association of America. The song's success enabled Vance to become a full-time songwriter.

Another success, written with Pockriss, was "Itsy Bitsy Teenie Weenie Yellow Polka Dot Bikini," recorded in 1960 by Brian Hyland, which rose to number one on the Billboard Hot 100 chart. Vance got the idea for the lyrics of "Itsy Bitsy Bikini" because his two-year-old daughter was too shy to wear a bikini in public. The song was a Top 10 hit in other countries around the world.

In all, Vance wrote over 300 songs, including recordings by Johnny Mathis, Paul Anka, and Tommy James and the Shondells. Pockriss and Vance released a single in 1959 for Columbia Records as 'Lee and Paul,' a novelty tune called "The Chick." They also provided English lyrics for the songs "Calcutta" and "(Alone) In My Room". "What Will Mary Say", a Top 10 hit for the singer Johnny Mathis in 1963, was written by Vance with Eddie Snyder.

Vance and Pockriss wrote a song titled "Leader Of The Laundromat," in 1964, the song was a spoof of "Leader of the Pack" by the Shangri-Las, and Vance produced a recording of the track by a trio consisting of Ron Dante, Tommy Wynn, and Vance's nephew Danny Jordan. The record was released under the name the Detergents, and its success led to an album, The Many Faces Of The Detergents, which Vance produced and for which he, along with Pockriss, penned all the songs. The release of "Leader of the Laundromat" earned a lawsuit against the group by "Leader Of The Pack" composers Jeff Barry, Ellie Greenwich, and George "Shadow" Morton. Dante would later work alongside Barry as lead vocalist for the Archies.

Vance and Pockriss wrote "What's Going On in the Barn," in 1965, which Billy Thornhill recorded for Wand Records as the B-side to his recording of "The Key," written by Pockriss and Hal Hackady. The following year, Vance had a minor hit as a singer when his recording of "Dommage, Dommage (Too Bad, Too Bad)", intended as a demo, was released by Scepter Records. It reached #97 on the Billboard Hot 100 and #107 on the Record World Singles Coming Up charts. Competing versions were released by Steve Rossi, whose version did not chart, and Jerry Vale, whose Columbia release peaked at #93 on the Hot 100 and at #5 on the Billboard Easy Listening charts.

Vance teamed up with Dante again in 1969 after the latter agreed to record a demo of the new Vance/Pockriss composition, "Tracy." Dante provided all the voices on the recording, both leads and backgrounds, and the single was released under the name The Cuff Links. Its success prompted Vance to bring Dante back into the recording studio to record an entire album's worth of songs, and the resultant LP, also titled Tracy, was rush-released to capitalize on the popularity of the single. As with The Detergents' album, Vance produced the recording sessions and co-wrote all of the songs with Pockriss.

Vance and Pockriss penned "Playground in My Mind," in 1972, which was recorded by Clint Holmes, and became a 1973 #2 hit on the Billboard Hot 100 chart, where it remained for twenty-three weeks. The single was awarded gold record status on July 3, 1973. Vance's son, Philip, sang on the refrain on the recording along with Holmes. Vance co-wrote and produced the song "Run Joey Run" for David Geddes in 1975; the song reached the top 5 on the Billboard charts that year. The female vocals on the song were provided by Vance's daughter Paula, who had earlier inspired "Itsy Bitsy Teenie Weenie Yellow Polka Dot Bikini." The songwriting duo also wrote the ballad, "I Haven't Got Anything Better To Do," first recorded by Astrud Gilberto and covered by Natalie Cole, Esther Phillips, and Dee Dee Warwick.

On April 14, 1980, Vance produced Andy Williams' recording of Vance and Tina Kaplan's penned "Christine, She's a Woman Now". for Columbia Records. The track remained in the vaults until February 2024.

Through the years, Vance continued to produce various recording artists, including Kathy Keates, who recorded, among other songs on the RCA Records label, the hit single "I Think About You" with Al Martino.

In October 2009, Vance was nominated for induction into the Songwriters Hall of Fame.

Vance was also a successful owner of harness racing horses. According to the United States Trotting Association he owned or leased 167 horses during his career, including record winner Secret Service, trained by his son Joseph Vance.

== Premature obituary ==
On September 6, 2006, a man named Paul van Valkenburgh of Ormond Beach, Florida, died from complications of lung cancer. An obituary published in The News-Times of Danbury, Connecticut repeated Van Valkenburgh's claim that he had written the song "Itsy Bitsy Teeny Weeny Yellow Polka-Dot Bikini" under the pen name of Paul Vance, but that he had sold his rights to the song decades earlier. The report was picked up by the Associated Press, which ran a short obituary of Vance based on both the News-Times obituary and information received from Van Valkenburgh's widow. The AP obituary was picked up by newspapers and other media outlets.

Vance contacted local media after viewing a report of his death on a local television news broadcast. He announced that he was still alive and was able to prove his identity to reporters with a stack of royalty checks from ASCAP for his songwriting. He told a reporter for The New York Times that his relatives and friends, shocked by the Associated Press report, had called to check on him after the media reports, and that two racehorses he owned had been scratched from races based on the reports. Vance also told the Times that he was considering legal action, since licensees outside the United States might be confused by the false report of his death and discontinue making royalty payments. He was quoted as saying, "Believe me, if they think you’re dead, they ain’t going to send the money."

== Memoir ==
In September 2014, after eight years in the making, Vance published his memoir, titled Catch a Falling Star.

== Personal life and death ==
Vance resided in Boca Raton, Florida. His son, Philip, who sang the chorus of "Playground in my Mind" with Clint Holmes, died on December 11, 2009, at age 44.

Vance died in West Palm Beach, Florida on May 30, 2022, at the age of 92.
