= Good Old Rock 'n' Roll =

1969 single by the Dave Clark Five

Single by The Dave Clark Five

from the album Good Old Rock'n'Roll
- A-side: "Good Old Rock 'n' Roll (Part One)"
- B-side: "Good Old Rock 'n' Roll (Part Two)"
- Released: 21 November 1969
- Recorded: 1969
- Genre: Rock and roll
- Length: 6:35
- Label: Columbia
- Songwriter(s): Roy Michaels; Bob Smith; Michael Equine; Charlie Chin; Larry Packer; Chuck Berry; Richard Penniman; Robert Blackwell; Enotris Johnson; J.P. Richardson; Dave Williams; Sunny David; Carl Perkins; Albert Collins
- Producer(s): Dave Clark

The Dave Clark Five singles chronology
| "Put a Little Love in Your Heart" (1969) | "Good Old Rock 'n' Roll" (1969) | "Everybody Get Together" (1970) |

"Good Old Rock 'n' Roll", also known as "The Dave Clark Play Good Old Rock 'n' Roll", is a medley by British band the Dave Clark Five, released as a single in November 1969. It was a top-ten hit in the UK, peaking at number 7 on the Singles Chart in January 1970.

== Medley ==
The A-side comprises seven songs: "Good Old Rock 'n' Roll", originally by Cat Mother & the All Night Newsboys; "Sweet Little Sixteen", originally by Chuck Berry; "Long Tall Sally", originally by Little Richard; "Chantilly Lace", originally by the Big Bopper; "Whole Lotta Shakin' Goin' On", best known for the version by Jerry Lee Lewis; "Blue Suede Shoes", originally by Carl Perkins; and "Lucille", originally by Little Richard.

The B-side comprises two songs, "Reelin' and Rockin'" and "Memphis Tennessee", both originally by Chuck Berry.

The single had audience screams dubbed in and the album version of the A-side was over half the time shorter. In the US, a single was also released as "Good Old Rock 'n' Roll". However, this single is equivalent to the follow-up medley "More Good Old Rock 'n' Roll".

== Reception ==
Reviewing for New Musical Express, Derek Johnson wrote that the single is not the "official follow-up to "Put a Little Love in Your Heart" – but a special 'bonus' release". He described it as a "great Christmas party disc for the young-at-heart", but that it "would have been better without the dubbed-in audience screams".

== Personnel ==
- Dave Clark – drums
- Mike Smith – vocals, piano, organ
- Lenny Davidson – guitar
- Rick Huxley – guitar, harmonica
- Denis Payton – saxophone

== Charts ==
| Chart (1970) | Peak position |
|---|---|
| Australia (Kent Music Report) | 92 |
| Ireland (IRMA) | 10 |
| South Africa (Springbok Radio) | 16 |
| UK Singles (OCC) | 7 |
