= Lee Pockriss =

American songwriter

- Born: Lee Julian Pockriss; January 20, 1924; Brooklyn, New York, U.S.
- Died: November 14, 2011 (aged 87) Bridgewater, Connecticut, U.S.
- Occupation: Songwriter

Lee Julian Pockriss (January 20, 1924 – November 14, 2011) was an American songwriter who wrote popular songs and scores for films and Broadway shows, mainly during the 1960s and 1970s.

== Early life and career ==
Born in Brooklyn and graduating from Erasmus Hall High School, Pockriss' education at Brooklyn College was interrupted by World War II, where he served as a cryptographer for the US Army Air Force. Upon his return he studied English and music at Brooklyn College, and later attended graduate school in musicology at New York University.

== Songwriting success ==
With Paul Vance he co-wrote Perry Como's Grammy-nominated "Catch a Falling Star", recorded in 1957; Brian Hyland's "Itsy Bitsy Teenie Weenie Yellow Polkadot Bikini", recorded in 1960; and The Cuff Links' "Tracy", recorded in 1969.

== Lee and Paul ==
In 1959, Pockriss and Vance released a single for Columbia records as "Lee and Paul", a novelty tune called "The Chick".

== Other songs ==
With Hal Hackady he co-wrote Billy Thornhill's "The Key", recorded in 1968 on Wand Records. Again with Hal Hackady, he co-wrote the ballad "Kites"', first recorded by The Rooftop Singers, though a subsequent recording by Simon Dupree and the Big Sound charted at number 8 in Britain.

He also wrote Anita Bryant's "My Little Corner of the World", recorded in 1960, Shelley Fabares' "Johnny Angel", recorded in 1962, and Clint Holmes' "Playground in My Mind", recorded in 1972.

== Broadway and film ==
With lyricist Anne Croswell he wrote the songs for the Broadway musical Tovarich starring Vivien Leigh, which received a Grammy nomination for Original Cast Album. Pockriss and Croswell also collaborated on the frequently produced Ernest in Love (based on The Importance of Being Earnest) and Bodo. Pockriss also wrote the music for the musicals Wonderful Olly, Dolley Madison, and Divorce Of Course, another collaboration with Hal Hackady.

Pockriss wrote seven original songs for MGM's full-length animated film The Phantom Tollbooth, scored the film The Subject Was Roses and wrote the title songs for One, Two, Three and the 1966 Western Stagecoach.

In 1969, Pockriss wrote the unproduced musical "Gatsby" based on F. Scott Fitzgerald's novel. with lyrics by Carolyn Leigh and book by Hugh Wheeler. UnsungMusicalsCo. Inc. presented its world premiere in concert form as part of the New York Musical Theatre Festival in September 2011.

== Sesame Street ==
In the 1980s, Pockriss wrote several songs for the children's educational series Sesame Street, including "I'm Between" (sung by Tony), "My Polliwog Ways" (sung by Kermit the Frog), "Transylvania Love Call" (Count von Count), and "My Rock" (Bert).

== Death ==
Pockriss died aged 87, on November 14, 2011, at his home in Bridgewater, Connecticut, United States, following a long illness.
