= List of one-hit wonders in the United States =

A one-hit wonder is a musical artist who is successful with one hit song, but without a comparable subsequent hit. The term may also be applied to an artist who is remembered for only one hit despite other successes. This article contains artists known primarily for one hit song in the United States, who are regarded as one-hit wonders by at least two sources in media, even though the artist may have had multiple hits abroad.

== Criteria ==
Music reviewers and journalists sometimes describe a musical artist as a one-hit wonder, based on their professional assessment of chart success, sales figures, and fame.

For his 2008 book One-Hit Wonders, music journalist Wayne Jancik defines a one-hit wonder as "an act that has won a position on Billboard's national, pop, Top 40 just once." In his definition of an "act", Jancik distinguishes between a solo performer and a group performance (thus, for example, Roger Daltrey's "Without Your Love" is counted despite Daltrey's numerous hits as frontman for the Who). Some musicians appear multiple times, either with multiple bands or as a member of a band and as a solo artist. (Eponymous bands are generally not separated; thus, Charlie Daniels is not counted as a one-hit wonder for "Uneasy Rider" and the hits of the Charlie Daniels Band are credited to him.)

Fred Bronson, a journalist and former writer for Billboard magazine, in his book Billboard's Hottest Hot 100 Hits, uses the criterion that an artist is ineligible to be categorized as a "one-hit wonder" if they have a second song listed on the Billboard Hot 100.

Disc jockey and music writer Brent Mann points out that some artists have been called "one-hit wonders" despite having other charting singles; in these cases, one signature song overshadows the rest of the artist's discography, so that only that song remains familiar to later audiences. As an example, English-born singer Albert Hammond enjoyed success with "It Never Rains in Southern California" (1972) rising to number 5 in the US, but his follow-up single, "I'm a Train" was dismissed by Mann as "totally forgotten" even though it charted at number 31 in 1974. In another case, Scottish rockers Simple Minds followed their big hit "Don't You (Forget About Me)" (appearing in the opening and closing scenes of the film The Breakfast Club) with "Alive and Kicking" which peaked at number 3 in the US, "Sanctify Yourself" which peaked at number 14 in the US, and "All the Things She Said" which peaked at number 28 in the US, yet the band is remembered primarily for the first song.

In his 2023 book "One Hit Wonders: Through The Decades", music enthusiast and One-Hit Wonder contest-winner Kevin Morris uses Jancik's Top 40 pop criteria, though a few extra rules come into play. Morris prohibits acts with hits on charts other than the Billboard Hot 100 (ex. Billboard Dance Charts, Billboard R&B Charts, Billboard Country Charts), acts whom have collaborated on hits from other acts (ex. Adina Howard who had a hit with "Freak Like Me" was also featured on Warren G's Top 40 remake of "What's Love Got to Do with It"), acts involving external hitmakers (ex. "Love Grows (Where My Rosemary Goes)" by Edison Lighthouse, "My Baby Loves Lovin'" by White Plains, "Gimme Dat Ding" by The Pipkins, and "Beach Baby" by First Class all involved the assistance of Tony Burrows, thus making all groups/songs ineligible), and acts whose song lasted less than four weeks on the Billboard Hot 100's Top 40. Also, Morris excludes acts who, in his words, "were so much more than a one-hit wonder"; the examples given being Jimi Hendrix and The Grateful Dead.

In his books "One-Hit Wonders of the 70's" (2020) and "One-Hit Wonders of the 80's" (2019), Top 40 Radio enthusiast Frank DeAngelis uses the "one song in the pop Top 40" criteria originally set by Jancik.

In his 2024 book "366 Days of One-Hit Wonders", lifelong pop music enthusiast Matt Whitaker uses the "one song in the pop Top 40" criteria originally set by Jancik. However, he also includes acts to have only graced the Billboard Hot 100's Top 40 once, but as featured acts rather than main acts. An example being Niia who had a feature on Wyclef Jean's Top 20 hit "Sweetest Girl (Dollar Bill)".

On the other hand, some artists with long, successful careers have been identified as one-hit wonders by virtue of having reached the Top 40 of the Hot 100 only once. Consequence of Sound editor Matt Melis lists Beck ("Loser") and the Grateful Dead ("Touch of Grey") as "technically" being one-hit wonders despite their large bodies of work. Entertainment Weekly mentions prolific artist Frank Zappa as a one-hit wonder because his only Top 40 hit was "Valley Girl" in 1982.

Chris Molanphy, a pop chart analyst and writer for Slate and The Village Voice, wrote that an artist can only be seen as a "one-hit wonder" if they have never had a second Billboard top 10 hit, if any subsequent top 40 singles were released within six months of their first big hit, and if the artist has not had three or more top 10 or Platinum albums.

== Wait calculation ==
There exists some debate regarding the amount of time needed for an artists to be deemed a One-Hit Wonder. This is to say, the likelihood of an artist becoming a One-Hit Wonder increases over time.

In both of Kevin Morris' books – released in 2023 and 2024 respectively – the most recent entry is the resurgence of Kate Bush's "Running Up That Hill" in 2022, indicating a wait calculation of roughly two years.

In Brent Mann's book – originally issued in 2003 and re-released in 2008 – there is a sentence in the introduction reading, "While the likes of, say, Michael Sembello ("Maniac"), Sir Mix-a-Lot ("Baby Got Back"), Baha Men ("Who Let The Dogs Out"), and Rick Dees & His Cast of Idiots ("Disco Duck") are undoubtedly fun one-hitters, those sorts of performers and their songs are definitely not what you'll find spotlighted here in the pages of 99 Red Balloons." Because "Who Let The Dogs Out" was released and hit it's commercial peak in the year 2000, this indicates a wait calculation of roughly three years.

In Matt Whitaker's book – released in 2024 – the timeline ends in the year 2015, indicting a wait calculation of roughly nine years.

In Wayne Jancik's book – released in 2008 – the timeline ends at December 31st, 1992, indicating a wait calculation of roughly fifteen years.

== Multiple appearances ==
Some artists have been described as qualifying as one-hit wonders multiple times. This can occur if a performer is a member of two different groups, each of which had just one hit, or had one hit as a member of a group and one hit as a solo artist. The following are examples:

Stuart Hamblen, American entertainer, released as a solo artist the single "This Ole House" (1954) and a single with his family as the group Cowboy Church Sunday School, "Open Up Your Heart (And Let the Sunshine In)" (1955).

In 1957, American duo Mickey & Sylvia had a hit with their song "Love Is Strange". By the 1970s, Sylvia Robinson was a solo act under the alias of Sylvia. Under this name, Sylvia had her first and only solo hit with "Pillow Talk" in 1973.

Ron Dante, American singer and songwriter, is credited as a one-hit wonder with three different acts. In 1964, Dante appeared in a group called the Detergents who reached the US Top 20 with their hit "Leader of the Laundromat" (a parody of "Leader of the Pack"). Five years later, in 1969, Dante appeared in the group the Cuff Links, who scored a top ten hit with "Tracy". That same year, Dante was also a member of the fictional band the Archies who scored a number 1 hit with "Sugar, Sugar".

Joey Levine, American session singer best known for his prolific work in the bubblegum pop and commercial jingle genera, recorded hits for the Kasenetz-Katz Singing Orchestral Circus's "Quick Joey Small (Run Joey Run)" (1968) and Reunion's "Life Is a Rock (But the Radio Rolled Me)" (September 1974).

Eddy Grant, Guyanese-British singer, had a hit with the English band the Equals called "Baby, Come Back" (1968), and as a solo artist for his 1983 song "Electric Avenue". Eddy Grant also had hits in Canada with "I Don't Wanna Dance at #15 and "Romancing The Stone" at #7. Those two were #53 and #26 respectively in the US.

Norman Greenbaum, American singer and songwriter, was a member of Dr. West's Medicine Show and Junk Band, who scored success in 1968 with the novelty song "The Eggplant That Ate Chicago". Greenbaum would later score a hit single for himself with "Spirit in the Sky" in 1970. His song "Canned Ham" also reached #26 in Canada and #46 in the US.

English musician Tony Burrows sang the lead vocal on five one-hit wonders: Edison Lighthouse's "Love Grows (Where My Rosemary Goes)" (February 1970); White Plains' "My Baby Loves Lovin'" (March 1970); the Pipkins' "Gimme Dat Ding" (April 1970); the First Class' "Beach Baby" (July 1974); and "United We Stand" (1970) by the first incarnation of the Brotherhood of Man.

Before he was the lead singer of English supergroup Bad Company, English-Canadian singer Paul Rodgers was in the English band Free, who scored a single US hit in 1970 with the song "All Right Now". In 1985, while Bad Company was on hiatus, Rodgers was the lead singer of the British band the Firm who achieved one-off success with "Radioactive".

Dave Mason, English singer-songwriter, was a member of the English–American supergroup Derek and the Dominos. In 1972, the group scored a US top ten hit with "Layla". Despite the song's success, Derek and the Dominoes disbanded. Mason would find some success on his own nearly reaching the US top ten one more time with the 1977 song "We Just Disagree".

David Foster, acclaimed Canadian record producer, was a member of the Canadian band Skylark that recorded "Wildflower" (1973). While he has been involved in numerous hit records as a songwriter or producer, his only hit as a solo artist was the instrumental "Love Theme from St. Elmo's Fire", which reached #15 in 1985.

JD Souther had a #27 hit in 1974 with "Fallin' in Love" as a member of the Souther–Hillman–Furay Band and a #7 hit in 1979 with "You're Only Lonely" as a solo artist.

The Dwight Twilley Band produced two double one-hit wonders. The Dwight Twilley Band consisted of Americans Dwight Twilley and Phil Seymour. The duo scored a hit in 1975 with "I'm on Fire". After the two split up, they both scored hits as solo artists. Seymour experienced major success as a solo artist first with his 1981 song "Precious to Me". Then, in 1984, Twilley had his turn at solo success with the song "Girls".

Bryan Ferry, English singer and songwriter, was the lead singer of the acclaimed English band Roxy Music, who, despite their fame, only managed to score one US Top 40 hit with "Love Is the Drug" in 1976. Ferry scored another hit in 1988 as a solo performer with "Kiss and Tell".

Chris Norman, an English singer, was the lead singer of the English rock band Smokie, which achieved chart success with the 1977 hit version of "Living Next Door to Alice". While Smokie never had another hit in the United States, Norman performed "Stumblin' In" with Suzi Quatro a year later and again found chart success. "Stumblin' In" would also be Quatro's only American top-40 hit despite consistent success in the UK, continental Europe, and Australia. (Quatro very narrowly missed the U.S. top 40 three times as a solo artist, peaking three songs between 41 and 45.)

Canadian musician Tom Cochrane was the lead singer of Canadian band Red Rider, who found fame in 1981 with the song "Lunatic Fringe", one of 17 songs they had on the Canadian charts. Nearly a decade later, Cochrane managed to score a hit as a solo artist with his 1992 song "Life Is a Highway", plus 14 other songs on the Canadian charts.

English singer Limahl sang lead vocals on two US one-hit-wonder songs; the first, "Too Shy" in 1983, came during his tenure as the frontman of the English group Kajagoogoo. The next year, he had another hit single as a solo artist with "The NeverEnding Story", the title track to the film The NeverEnding Story. The latter song charted at number 17 in May 1985.

Ish Ledesma, American musician, has been a part of several musical groups, two of which became one-hit wonders. In 1983, his American group OXO reached the charts with "Whirly Girl". After the group's dissolution, Ledesma formed American group Company B, who scored their own hit in 1987 with "Fascinated".

Jimmy Somerville, Scottish vocalist, was the lead singer of two separate groups that are considered one-hit wonders. In 1984, British band Bronski Beat achieved their only US hit with "Smalltown Boy". After they disbanded, Somerville became part of the British duo the Communards who managed to score a Top 40 hit with their version of "Don't Leave Me This Way" in 1987.

Dan Baird, American singer-songwriter, was lead singer and rhythm guitarist with the American band the Georgia Satellites, who had the single "Keep Your Hands to Yourself" (1987); then as a solo artist had the single "I Love You Period" (1993).

In 1987, American musician Brent Bourgeois found success with the song "I Don't Mind At All" in the group Bourgeois Tagg. Bourgeois also managed to score a hit as a solo artist in 1990 with "Dare to Fall in Love".

Everlast, American rapper, was part of the American hip-hop trio House of Pain who scored a Top 5 hit with their song "Jump Around" (1992). After the group split up, Everlast found solo success in 1999 with the hit song "What It's Like".

== List ==
At least two publications have identified each artist listed here as being a one-hit wonder in the U.S. Numerous artists listed here have reached the Top 40 on the US Billboard Hot 100 more than once. The year indicates when the song charted or peaked. Based on the peak date, the entries are listed chronologically. If an entry did not chart, it is listed by the song's release date. In some cases, the song listed here was a collaboration with another artist who is not considered a one-hit wonder.

== 1950s ==
- Anton Karas – "The Third Man Theme" (1950)
- Jackie Brenston and His Delta Cats – "Rocket 88" (1951)
- Gayla Peevey – "I Want a Hippopotamus for Christmas" (1953)
- The Chords – "Sh-Boom" (1954)
- Stuart Hamblen – "This Ole House" (1954)
- Joan Weber – "Let Me Go, Lover!" (1955)
- The Penguins – "Earth Angel" (1955)
- Peggy King – "Make Yourself Comfortable" (1955)
- DeJohn Sisters – "(My Baby Don't Love Me) No More" (1955)
- Johnny Ace – "Pledging My Love" (1955)
- Cowboy Church Sunday School – "Open Up Your Heart (And Let the Sunshine In)" (1955)
- The Voices of Walter Schumann – "The Ballad of Davy Crockett" (1955)
- Laurie Sisters – "Dixie Danny" (1955)
- Lenny Dee – "Plantation Boogie" (1955)
- Nappy Brown – "Don't Be Angry" (1955)
- Caterina Valente – "The Breeze and I" (1955)
- Marion Marlowe – "The Man in the Raincoat" (1955)
- Priscilla Wright – "The Man in the Raincoat" (1955)
- Cliffie Stone – "The Popcorn Song" (1955)
- Chuck Miller – "The House of Blue Lights" (1955)
- Lillian Briggs – "I Want You to Be My Baby" (1955)
- The El Dorados – "At My Front Door (Crazy Little Mamma)" (1955)
- Bonnie Lou – "Daddy-O" (1955)
- Steve Allen – "Autumn Leaves" (1955)
- Julie London – "Cry Me A River" (1955)
- The Singing Dogs – "Oh! Susanna" (1955)
- Ricky Zahnd & The Blue Jeaners – "Nuttin' for Christmas" (1955)
- Barry Gordon – "Nuttin' for Christmas" (1955)
- Joe Ward – "Nuttin' for Christmas" (1955)
- Kit Carson – "Band of Gold" (1956)
- The Turbans – "When You Dance" (1956)
- Bobby Scott – "Chain Gang" (1956)
- The Bonnie Sisters – "Cry Baby" (1956)
- The Four Voices – "Lovely One" (1956)
- Kay Thompson – "Eloise" (1956)
- The Teen Queens – "Eddie My Love" (1956)
- Elmer Bernstein – "Main Theme from The Man with the Golden Arm" (1956)
- Carl Perkins – "Blue Suede Shoes" (1956)
- Morris Stoloff – "Moonglow and Theme from Picnic" (1956)
- Don Robertson – "The Happy Whistler" (1956)
- Cathy Carr – "Ivory Tower" (1956)
- The Rover Boys – "Graduation Day" (1956)
- The Cadets – "Stranded in the Jungle" (1956)
- The Jayhawks – "Stranded in the Jungle" (1956)
- The Six Teens – "A Casual Look" (1956)
- Sanford Clark – "The Fool" (1956)
- Helmut Zacharias and His Magic Violins – "When the White Lilacs Bloom Again" (1956)
- The Lennon Sisters – "Tonight You Belong to Me" (1956)
- Little Joe & The Thrillers – "Peanuts" (1956)
- Jane Powell – "True Love" (1956)
- Eddie Cooley & The Dimples – "Priscilla" (1956)
- The Highlights – "City of Angels" (1956)
- Sonny Knight – "Confidential" (1956)
- Joe Valino – "Garden of Eden" (1956)
- Sil Austin – "Slow Walk" (1956)
- Vince Martin – "Cindy, Oh Cindy" (1956)
- Jerry Lewis – "Rock-a-Bye Your Baby with a Dixie Melody" (1956)
- Ivory Joe Hunter – "Since I Met You Baby" (1956)
- Russell Arms – "Cinco Robles (Five Oaks)" (1957)
- Mickey & Sylvia – "Love Is Strange" (1957)
- The Jive Bombers – "Bad Boy" (1957)
- Kenneth Copeland – "Pledge of Love" (1957)
- The Mello-Tones – "Rosie Lee" (1957)
- Randy Starr – "After School" (1957)
- Dale Hawkins – "Susie Q" (1957)
- Bonnie Guitar – "Dark Moon" (1957)
- Roy Brown – "Let the Four Winds Blow" (1957)
- Johnnie & Joe – "Over the Mountain; Across the Sea" (1957)
- Dave Gardner – "White Silver Sands" (1957)
- Russ Hamilton – "Rainbow" (1957)
- The Bobbettes – "Mr. Lee" (1957)
- Anthony Perkins – "Moonlight Swim" (1957)
- Joe Bennett & The Sparkletones – "Black Slacks" (1957)
- The Tune Weavers – "Happy, Happy Birthday Baby" (1957)
- The Rays – "Silhouettes B/W Daddy Cool" (1957)
- Thurston Harris – "Little Bitty Pretty One" (1957)
- Shepherd Sisters – "Alone (Why Must I Be Alone)" (1957)
- The Dubs – "Could This Be Magic" (1957)
- The Techniques – "Hey Little Girl" (1957)
- Bill Justis – "Raunchy" (1957)
- Margie Rayburn – "I'm Available" (1957)
- Ernie Freeman – "Raunchy" (1957)
- Bobby Helms – "Jingle Bell Rock" (1957)
- The Royal Teens – "Short Shorts" (1958)
- The Hollywood Flames – "Buzz-Buzz-Buzz" (1958)
- Nick Todd – "At the Hop" (1958)
- The Silhouettes – "Get a Job" (1958)
- Dale Wright with the Rock-Its – "She's Neat" (1958)
- The Crescendos – "Oh Julie" (1958)
- Sammy Salvo – "Oh Julie" (1958)
- The Pastels – "Been So Long" (1958)
- The Champs – "Tequila" (1958)
- Ronald & Ruby – "Lollipop" (1958)
- Laurie London – "He's Got the Whole World in His Hands" (1958)
- The Monotones – "The Book of Love" (1958)
- The Voxpoppers – "Wishing For Your Love" (1958)
- David Seville – "Witch Doctor" (1958)
- The Aquatones – "You" (1958)
- Ed Townsend – "For Your Love" (1958)
- Valerie Carr – "When the Boys Talk About the Girls" (1958)
- The Pets – "Cha-Hua-Hua" (1958)
- Sheb Wooley – "The Purple People Eater" (1958)
- The Kalin Twins – "When" (1958)
- Gino & Gina – "(It's Been a Long Long Time) Pretty Baby" (1958)
- Jan & Arnie – "Jennie Lee" (1958)
- Jody Reynolds – "Endless Sleep" (1958)
- The Big Bopper – "Chantilly Lace" (1958)
- The Danleers – "One Summer Night" (1958)
- Frankie Vaughan – "Judy" (1958)
- Tony & Joe – "The Freeze" (1958)
- Bobby Hamilton – "Crazy Eyes for You" (1958)
- Domenico Modugno – "Nel Blu Dipinto Di Blu (Volare)" (1958)
- The Elegants – "Little Star" (1958)
- The Poni-Tails – "Born Too Late" (1958)
- The Quin-Tones – "Down the Aisle of Love" (1958)
- The Jamies – "Summertime, Summertime" (1958)
- Boots Brown – "Cerveza" (1958)
- The Shields – "You Cheated" (1958)
- Bobby Hendricks – "Itchy Twitchy Feeling" (1958)
- Donnie Owens – "Need You" (1958)
- Bobby Day – "Rockin' Robin" (1958)
- Earl Grant – "The End" (1958)
- Robin Luke – "Susie Darlin'" (1958)
- The Five Blobs – "The Blob" (1958)
- The Teddy Bears – "To Know Him is to Love Him" (1958)
- The Nu-Tornados – "Philadelphia, U.S.A." (1958)
- Jesse Lee Turner – "The Little Space Girl" (1959)
- Eugene Church & The Fellows – "Pretty Girls Everywhere" (1959)
- The Bell Notes – "I've Had It" (1959)
- Gene Allison – "You Can Make It If You Try" (1959)
- The Mark IV – "I Got a Wife" (1959)
- Jesse Belvin – "Guess Who" (1959)
- Frankie Ford – "Sea Cruise" (1959)
- Dodie Stevens – "Pink Shoe Laces" (1959)
- The Virtues – "Guitar Boogie Shuffle" (1959)
- Travis and Bob – "Tell Him No" (1959)
- The Impalas – "Sorry (I Ran All the Way Home)" (1959)
- Edd Byrnes – "Kookie, Kookie (Lend Me Your Comb)" (1959)
- Wilbert Harrison – "Kansas City" (1959)
- Gary Stites – "Lonely for You" (1959)
- Billy Storm – "I've Come of Age" (1959)
- Gerry Granahan – "No Chemise, Please" (1959)
- The Fiestas – "So Fine" (1959)
- Preston Epps – "Bongo Rock" (1959)
- The Mystics – "Hushabye" (1959)
- Stonewall Jackson – "Waterloo" (1959)
- The Falcons – "You're So Fine" (1959)
- Homer and Jethro – "The Battle of Kookamonga" (1959)
- Jerry Keller – "Here Comes Summer" (1959)
- Tony Bellus – "Robbin the Cradle" (1959)
- Phil Phillips – "Sea of Love" (1959)
- Bob McFadden and Dor – "The Mummy" (1959)
- The Tempos – "See You in September" (1959)
- Santo & Johnny – "Sleep Walk" (1959)
- Floyd Robinson – "Makin' Love" (1959)
- Nina Simone – "I Loves You, Porgy" (1959)
- Bo Diddley – "Say Man" (1959)
- Mormon Tabernacle Choir – "Battle Hymn of the Republic" (1959)
- The Fireflies – "You Were Mine" (1959)
- Wink Martindale – "The Deck of Cards" (1959)
- The Islanders – "Enchanted Sea" (1959)
- Tommy Facenda – "High School U.S.A." (1959)
- The Rock-A-Teens – "Woo-Hoo" (1959)
- The Revels – "Midnight Stroll" (1959)
- Ernie Fields – "In the Mood" (1959)
- Hugo & Luigi – "Just Come Home" (1959)
- The Nutty Squirrels – "Uh Oh! Part 2" (1959)

== 1960s ==
- Larry Hall – "Sandy" (1960)
- Rod Lauren – "If I Had a Girl" (1960)
- Mark Dinning – "Teen Angel" (1960)
- Spencer Ross – "Tracy's Theme" (1960)
- Ray Smith – "Rockin' Little Angel" (1960)
- Dorsey Burnette – "(There Was a) Tall Oak Tree" (1960)
- The Little Dippers – "Forever" (1960)
- Monty Kelly – "Summer Set" (1960)
- Barrett Strong – "Money (That's What I Want)" (1960)
- Johnny Ferguson – "Angela Jones" (1960)
- Buster Brown – "Fannie Mae" (1960)
- Billy Bland – "Let the Little Girl Dance" (1960)
- Harold Dorman – "Mountain of Love" (1960)
- Jessie Hill – "Ooh Poo Pah Doo" (1960)
- Jeanne Black – "He'll Have to Stay" (1960)
- Bobby Marchan – "There's Something on Your Mind" (1960)
- The Hollywood Argyles – "Alley-Oop" (1960)
- The Fendermen – "Mule Skinner Blues" (1960)
- Garry Mills/Deane Hawley/Buzz Cason – "Look for a Star" (1960)
- The Safaris – "Image of a Girl" (1960)
- Hank Locklin – "Please Help Me, I'm Falling" (1960)
- Johnny Bond – "Hot Rod Lincoln" (1960)
- The Ivy Three – "Yogi" (1960)
- Larry Verne – "Mr. Custer" (1960)
- Bob Luman – "Let's Think About Living" (1960)
- The Paradons – "Diamonds and Pearls" (1960)
- Joe Jones – "You Talk Too Much" (1960)
- Maurice Williams and the Zodiacs – "Stay" (1960)
- Etta Jones – "Don't Go to Strangers" (1960)
- Lolita – "Sailor (Your Home Is the Sea)" (1960)
- The Shells – "Baby, Oh Baby" (1961)
- Rosie and the Originals – "Angel Baby" (1961)
- H.B. Barnum – "Lost Love" (1961)
- The Capris – "There's a Moon Out Tonight" (1961)
- Jørgen Ingmann and his Guitar – "Apache" (1961)
- Freddie King – "Hideaway" (1961)
- Paul Dino – "Ginnie Bell" (1961)
- Kokomo – "Asia Minor" (1961)
- Joe Barry – "I'm a Fool to Care" (1961)
- The Echoes – "Baby Blue" (1961)
- Ernie K-Doe – "Mother-In-Law" (1961)
- Shep & The Limelites – "Daddy's Home" (1961)
- Janie Grant – "Triangle" (1961)
- Eddie Harris – "Exodus" (1961)
- The Cleftones – "Heart and Soul" (1961)
- The Marathons – "Peanut Butter" (1961)
- The Edsels – "Rama Lama Ding Dong" (1961)
- Donnie and The Dreamers – "Count Every Star" (1961)
- The Starlets – "Better Tell Him No" (1961)
- Little Caesar & the Romans – "Those Oldies but Goodies (Remind Me of You)" (1961)
- The Velvets – "Tonight (Could Be the Night)" (1961)
- Arthur Lyman – "Yellow Bird" (1961)
- Chris Kenner – "I Like It Like That, Part 1" (1961)
- The Mar-Keys – "Last Night" (1961)
- Curtis Lee – "Pretty Little Angel Eyes" (1961)
- Ann-Margret – "I Just Don't Understand" (1961)
- The Dreamlovers – "When We Get Married" (1961)
- The Jarmels – "A Little Bit of Soap" (1961)
- The Halos – "Nag" (1961)
- The Blue Jays – "Lovers Island" (1961)
- Barry Mann – "Who Put the Bomp (in the Bomp, Bomp, Bomp)" (1961)
- Dave Brubeck Quartet – "Take Five" (1961)
- The Stereos – "I Really Love You" (1961)
- The Tokens – "The Lion Sleeps Tonight" (1961)
- Kenny Dino – "Your Ma Said You Cried in Your Sleep Last Night" (1961)
- Phil McLean – "Small Sad Sam" (1962)
- Jimmy Elledge – "Funny How Time Slips Away" (1962)
- Barbara George – "I Know (You Don't Love Me No More)" (1962)
- James Ray – "If You Gotta Make a Fool of Somebody" (1962)
- Bruce Channel – "Hey! Baby" (1962)
- Kenny Ball and His Jazzmen – "Midnight in Moscow" (1962)
- Don & Juan – "What's Your Name" (1962)
- Billy Joe & The Checkmates – "Percolator (Twist)" (1962)
- Charlie Drake – "My Boomerang Won't Come Back" (1962)
- The Corsairs – "Smoky Places" (1962)
- Eddie Holland – "Jamie" (1962)
- Ketty Lester – "Love Letters" (1962)
- Larry Finnegan – "Dear One" (1962)
- Arthur Alexander – "You Better Move On" (1962)
- Ernie Maresca – "Shout! Shout! (Knock Yourself Out)" (1962)
- Mr. Acker Bilk – "Stranger on the Shore" (1962)
- Ronnie & the Hi-Lites – "I Wish That We Were Married" (1962)
- Jimmy Smith – "Walk on the Wild Side" (1962)
- Nathaniel Mayer & The Fabulous Twilights – "Village of Love" (1962)
- The Volumes – "I Love You" (1962)
- Joanie Sommers – "Johnny Get Angry" (1962)
- Little Joey & The Flips – "Bongo Stomp" (1962)
- Barbara Lynn – "You'll Lose a Good Thing" (1962)
- Claudine Clark – "Party Lights" (1962)
- The Springfields – "Silver Threads and Golden Needles" (1962)
- The Majors – "A Wonderful Dream" (1962)
- Bent Fabric – "Alley Cat" (1962)
- Frank Ifield – "I Remember You" (1962)
- The Contours – "Do You Love Me" (1962)
- Bunker Hill – "Hide and Go Seek Part 1" (1962)
- Mike Clifford – "Close to Cathy" (1962)
- The Sherrys – "Pop Pop Pop-Pie" (1962)
- Trade Martin – "That Stranger Used to Be My Girl" (1962)
- Bobby Pickett – "Monster Mash" (1962)
- Marcie Blane – "Bobby's Girl" (1962)
- Mark Valentino – "The Push and Kick" (1962)
- The Tornadoes – "Telstar" (1962)
- The Routers – "Let's Go (Pony)" (1962)
- The Exciters – "Tell Him" (1963)
- The Earls – "Remember Then" (1963)
- The Pastel Six – "Cinnamon Cinder (It's a Very Nice Dance)" (1963)
- Johnny Thunder – "Loop de Loop" (1963)
- Joe Harnell & His Orchestra – "Fly Me to the Moon-Bossa Nova" (1963)
- Vince Guaraldi Trio – "Cast Your Fate to the Wind" (1963)
- The Cascades – "Rhythm of the Rain" (1963)
- The Rockin' Rebels – "Wild Weekend" (1963)
- Jan Bradley – "Mama Didn't Lie" (1963)
- Bill Pursell – "Our Winter Love" (1963)
- Boots Randolph – "Yakety Sax" (1963)
- Little Peggy March – "I Will Follow Him" (1963)
- The Chantays – "Pipeline" (1963)
- James Gilreath – "Little Band of Gold" (1963)
- Jimmy Soul – "If You Wanna Be Happy" (1963)
- The Rocky Fellers – "Killer Joe" (1963)
- Theola Kilgore – "The Love of My Man" (1963)
- Baby Washington – "That's How Heartaches Are Made" (1963)
- Kyu Sakamoto – "Sukiyaki" (1963)
- Rolf Harris – "Tie Me Kangaroo Down, Sport" (1963)
- Big Dee Irwin – "Swingin' on a Star" (1963)
- Doris Troy – "Just One Look" (1963)
- The Glencoves – "Hootenanny" (1963)
- The Classics – "Till Then" (1963)
- Dave Dudley – "Six Days on the Road" (1963)
- The Surfaris – "Wipe Out" (1963)
- Jack Nitzsche – "The Lonely Surfer" (1963)
- Kai Winding – "More" (1963)
- Randy & the Rainbows – "Denise" (1963)
- Inez & Charlie Foxx – "Mockingbird" (1963)
- Diane Ray – "Please Don't Talk to the Lifeguard" (1963)
- The Jaynetts – "Sally Go 'Round the Roses" (1963)
- The Ran-Dells – "Martian Hop" (1963)
- The Raindrops – "The Kind of Boy You Can't Forget" (1963)
- Little Johnny Taylor – "Part Time Love" (1963)
- The Pixies Three – "Birthday Party" (1963)
- Sunny & the Sunglows – "Talk to Me" (1963)
- Los Indios Tabajaras – "María Elena" (1963)
- Robin Ward – "Wonderful Summer" (1963)
- Betty Harris – "Cry to Me" (1963)
- The Village Stompers – "Washington Square" (1963)
- The Singing Nun – "Dominique" (1963)
- Barry & the Tamerlanes – "I Wonder What She's Doing Tonight" (1963)
- The Kingsmen – "Louie Louie" (1963)
- The Caravelles – "You Don't Have to Be a Baby to Cry" (1963)
- The Secrets – "The Boy Next Door" (1963)
- The Murmaids – "Popsicles and Icicles" (1964)
- The Tams – "What Kind of Fool (Do You Think I Am)" (1964)
- The Trashmen – "Surfin' Bird" (1964)
- The Rivieras – "California Sun" (1964)
- The Pyramids – "Penetration" (1964)
- The Sapphires – "Who Do You Love" (1964)
- Tommy Tucker – "High-Heel Sneakers" (1964)
- The Swinging Blue Jeans – "Hippy Hippy Shake" (1964)
- The Devotions – "Rip Van Winkle" (1964)
- Terry Stafford – "Suspicion" (1964)
- The Carefrees – "We Love You Beatles" (1964)
- Danny Williams – "White on White" (1964)
- Irma Thomas – "Wish Someone Would Care" (1964)
- The Reflections – "(Just Like) Romeo and Juliet" (1964)
- The Wailers – "Tall Cool One" (1964)
- Millie Small – "My Boy Lollipop" (1964)
- Rita Pavone – "Remember Me" (1964)
- Astrud Gilberto – "The Girl from Ipanema" (1964)
- The Premiers – "Farmer John" (1964)
- Cilla Black – "You're My World" (1964)
- The Jelly Beans – "I Wanna Love Him So Bad" (1964)
- Earl-Jean – "I'm Into Somethin' Good" (1964)
- Jimmy Hughes – "Steal Away" (1964)
- The Chartbusters – "She's the One" (1964)
- Patty & the Emblems – "Mixed Up, Shook Up Girl" (1964)
- Joe Hinton – "Funny (How Time Slips Away)" (1964)
- Gale Garnett – "We'll Sing in the Sunshine" (1964)
- The Hondells – "Little Honda" (1964)
- J. Frank Wilson and the Cavaliers – "Last Kiss" (1964)
- The Nashville Teens – "Tobacco Road" (1964)
- The Honeycombs – "Have I the Right?" (1964)
- Lorne Greene – "Ringo" (1964)
- The Detergents – "Leader of the Laundromat" (1964)
- The Larks – "The Jerk" (1965)
- The Waikikis – "Hawaii Tattoo" (1965)
- The Ad Libs – "The Boy from New York City" (1965)
- Adam Faith with The Roulettes – "It's Alright" (1965)
- The Trade Winds – "New York's A Lonely Town" (1965)
- Jewel Akens – "The Birds and the Bees" (1965)
- Shirley Bassey – "Goldfinger" (1965)
- Wayne Fontana & The Mindbenders – "The Game of Love" (1965)
- Cannibal & the Headhunters – "Land of a Thousand Dances" (1965)
- Sounds Orchestral – "Cast Your Fate to the Wind" (1965)
- Tony Clarke – "The Entertainer" (1965)
- Glenn Yarbrough – "Baby the Rain Must Fall" (1965)
- Eddie Rambeau – "Concrete and Clay" (1965)
- Unit 4 + 2 – "Concrete and Clay" (1965)
- The Marvelows – "I Do" (1965)
- Horst Jankowski – "A Walk in the Black Forest" (1965)
- Fred Hughes – "Oo Wee Baby, I Love You" (1965)
- Barry McGuire – "Eve of Destruction" (1965)
- The McCoys – "Hang on Sloopy" (1965)
- The Spokesmen – "The Dawn of Correction" (1965)
- The Castaways – "Liar, Liar" (1965)
- The Gentrys – "Keep On Dancing" (1965)
- Jonathan King – "Everyone's Gone to the Moon" (1965)
- The Silkie – "You've Got to Hide Your Love Away" (1965)
- The Wonder Who? – "Don't Think Twice" (1965)
- The Viscounts – "Harlem Nocturne" (1966)
- Jackie Lee – "The Duck" (1966)
- The Knickerbockers – "Lies" (1966)
- The T-Bones – "No Matter What Shape (Your Stomach's In)" (1966)
- Staff Sergeant Barry Sadler – "Ballad of the Green Berets" (1966)
- Bob Lind – "Elusive Butterfly" (1966)
- Bob Kuban and the In-Men – "The Cheater" (1966)
- Neal Hefti – "Batman Theme" (1966)
- Deon Jackson – "Love Makes the World Go 'Round" (1966)
- Norma Tanega – "Walkin' My Cat Named Dog" (1966)
- Brian Wilson – "Caroline, No" (1966)
- Just Us – "I Can't Grow Peaches on a Cherry Tree" (1966)
- Buddy Starcher – "History Repeats Itself" (1966)
- Robert Parker – "Barefootin" (1966)
- The Shades of Blue – "Oh How Happy" (1966)
- The Capitols – "Cool Jerk" (1966)
- The Swingin' Medallions – "Double Shot (Of My Baby's Love)" (1966)
- Syndicate of Sound – "Little Girl" (1966)
- The Standells – "Dirty Water" (1966)
- The Leaves – "Hey Joe" (1966)
- Crispian St. Peters – "Pied Piper" (1966)
- The Troggs – "Wild Thing" (1966)
- Napoleon XIV – "They're Coming to Take Me Away, Ha-Haaa!" (1966)
- Bobby Hebb – "Sunny" (1966)
- Verdelle Smith – "Tar and Cement" (1966)
- Love – "7 and 7 Is" (1966)
- Los Bravos – "Black Is Black" (1966)
- Darrell Banks – "Open the Door to Your Heart" (1966)
- Count Five – "Psychotic Reaction" (1966)
- Walter Wanderley – "Summer Samba (So Nice)" (1966)
- ? and the Mysterians – "96 Tears" (1966)
- New Vaudeville Band – "Winchester Cathedral" (1966)
- Chicago Loop – "(When She Needs Good Lovin') She Comes to Me" (1966)
- J.J. Jackson – "But It's Alright" (1966)
- The Music Machine – "Talk Talk" (1967)
- Senator Everett McKinley Dirksen – "Gallant Men" (1967)
- Blues Magoos – "(We Ain't Got) Nothin' Yet" (1967)
- Bob Crewe Generation – "Music to Watch Girls By" (1967)
- Keith – "98.6" (1967)
- Sopwith Camel – "Hello Hello" (1967)
- The Seeds – "Pushin' Too Hard" (1967)
- The Casinos – "Then You Can Tell Me Goodbye" (1967)
- Buffalo Springfield – "For What It's Worth" (1967)
- Five Americans – "Western Union" (1967)
- The Easybeats – "Friday on My Mind" (1967)
- The Yellow Balloon – "Yellow Balloon" (1967)
- The Parade – "Sunshine Girl" (1967)
- Jon and Robin & the In-Crowd – "Do It Again A Little Bit Slower" (1967)
- Scott McKenzie – "San Francisco (Be Sure to Wear Flowers in Your Hair)" (1967)
- The Fifth Estate – "Ding-Dong! The Witch Is Dead" (1967)
- The Music Explosion – "Little Bit O' Soul" (1967)
- Every Mother's Son – "Come On Down to My Boat" (1967)
- Procol Harum – "A Whiter Shade of Pale" (1967)
- Davie Allan & The Arrows – "Blue's Theme" (1967)
- Bill Cosby – "Little Ole Man (Uptight, Everything's Alright)" (1967)
- The Mojo Men – "Sit Down, I Think I Love You" (1967)
- The Soul Survivors – "Expressway to Your Heart" (1967)
- The Hombres – "Let It Out (Let It All Hang Out)" (1967)
- Robert Knight – "Everlasting Love" (1967)
- Strawberry Alarm Clock – "Incense and Peppermints" (1967)
- Miriam Makeba – "Pata Pata" (1967)
- The Sunshine Company – "Back on the Street Again" (1967)
- The Rose Garden – "Next Plane to London" (1967)
- John Fred and His Playboy Band – "Judy in Disguise (With Glasses)" (1968)
- Stone Poneys – "Different Drum" (1968)
- The Sandpebbles – "Love Power" (1968)
- The American Breed – "Bend Me, Shape Me" (1968)
- The Lemon Pipers – "Green Tambourine" (1968)
- Human Beinz – "Nobody But Me" (1968)
- Paul Mauriat – "Love Is Blue" (1968)
- Madeline Bell – "I'm Gonna Make You Love Me" (1968)
- The Balloon Farm – "A Question of Temperature" (1968)
- The Sweet Inspirations – "Sweet Inspiration" (1968)
- Blue Cheer – "Summertime Blues" (1968)
- Richard Harris – "MacArthur Park" (1968)
- Friend & Lover – "Reach Out of the Darkness" (1968)
- People! – "I Love You" (1968)
- Merrilee Rush & The Turnabouts – "Angel of The Morning" (1968)
- Tiny Tim – "Tip Toe Thru' The Tulips With Me" (1968)
- Shorty Long – "Here Comes The Judge" (1968)
- Hugh Masekela – "Grazing in the Grass" (1968)
- Pigmeat Markham – "Here Comes the Judge" (1968)
- Mason Williams – "Classical Gas" (1968)
- Status Quo – "Pictures of Matchstick Men" (1968)
- The Amboy Dukes – "Journey To The Center of The Mind" (1968)
- Vanilla Fudge – "You Keep Me Hangin' On" (1968)
- Jeannie C. Riley – "Harper Valley P.T.A." (1968)
- The O'Kaysions – "Girl Watcher" (1968)
- Don Fardon – "Indian Reservation" (1968)
- The Crazy World of Arthur Brown – "Fire" (1968)
- Max Frost and the Troopers – "Shape of Things to Come" (1968)
- Iron Butterfly – "In-A-Gadda-Da-Vida" (1968)
- The Equals – "Baby, Come Back" (1968)
- The Avant-Garde – "Naturally Stoned" (1968)
- Dr. West's Medicine Show and Junk Band – "The Eggplant That Ate Chicago" (1968)
- Bull & the Matadors – "The Funky Judge" (1968)
- Leapy Lee – "Little Arrows" (1968)
- Kasenetz-Katz Singing Orchestral Circus – "Quick Joey Small (Run Joey Run)" (1968)
- The Magic Lanterns – "Shame, Shame" (1968)
- Derek – "Cinnamon" (1969)
- The Brooklyn Bridge – "Worst That Could Happen" (1969)
- Spirit – "I Got a Line on You" (1969)
- Bubble Puppy – "Hot Smoke & Sasafrass" (1969)
- Crazy Elephant – "Gimme Gimme Good Lovin'" (1969)
- The Peppermint Rainbow – "Will You Be Staying After Sunday" (1969)
- The Flirtations – "Nothing but a Heartache" (1969)
- Mercy – "Love (Can Make You Happy)" (1969)
- Edwin Hawkins Singers – "Oh Happy Day" (1969)
- The Neon Philharmonic – "Morning Girl" (1969)
- Spiral Starecase – "More Today Than Yesterday" (1969)
- Desmond Dekker & The Aces – "Israelites" (1969)
- The Checkmates, LTD. – "Black Pearl" (1969)
- The Buchanan Brothers – "Medicine Man" (1969)
- Zager and Evans – "In the Year 2525" (1969)
- The Winstons – "Color Him Father" (1969)
- Joe Jeffrey Group – "My Pledge of Love" (1969)
- Roy Clark – "Yesterday When I Was Young" (1969)
- Johnny Adams – "Reconsider Me" (1969)
- Vik Venus – "Moonflight" (1969)
- Tony Joe White – "Polk Salad Annie" (1969)
- The Youngbloods – "Get Together" (1969)
- Underground Sunshine – "Birthday" (1969)
- The Illusion – "Did You See Her Eyes" (1969)
- Clarence Reid – "Nobody But You Babe" (1969)
- Motherlode – "When I Die" (1969)
- The Archies – "Sugar, Sugar" (1969)
- The Clique – "Sugar on Sunday" (1969)
- The Cuff Links – "Tracy" (1969)
- The Rugbys – "You, I" (1969)
- Wind – "Make Believe" (1969)
- Smith – "Baby It's You" (1969)
- Thunderclap Newman – "Something in the Air" (1969)
- Keith Barbour – "Echo Park" (1969)
- R. B. Greaves – "Take a Letter Maria" (1969)
- The Flying Machine – "Smile a Little Smile for Me" (1969)
- Steam – "Na Na Hey Hey Kiss Him Goodbye" (1969)

== 1970s ==
- Crow – "Evil Woman (Don't Play Your Games with Me)" (1970)
- Shocking Blue – "Venus" (1970)
- Jefferson – "Baby Take Me in Your Arms" (1970)
- Eddie Holman – "Hey There Lonely Girl" (1970)
- The Street People – "Jennifer Tomkins" (1970)
- Tee Set – "Ma Belle Amie" (1970)
- The Jaggerz – "The Rapper" (1970)
- Edison Lighthouse – "Love Grows (Where My Rosemary Goes)" (1970)
- Frijid Pink – "The House of the Rising Sun" (1970)
- Norman Greenbaum – "Spirit in the Sky" (1970)
- Jack Blanchard & Misty Morgan – "Tennessee Bird Walk" (1970)
- Marmalade – "Reflections of My Life" (1970)
- The Ides of March – "Vehicle" (1970)
- White Plains – "My Baby Loves Lovin'" (1970)
- Blues Image – "Ride Captain Ride" (1970)
- Mountain – "Mississippi Queen" (1970)
- Five Stairsteps – "O-o-h Child" (1970)
- The Pipkins – "Gimme Dat Ding" (1970)
- Miguel Ríos – "A Song of Joy (Himno a la Alegria)" (1970)
- Crabby Appleton – "Go Back" (1970)
- Pacific Gas & Electric – "Are You Ready?" (1970)
- Alive N Kickin' – "Tighter, Tighter" (1970)
- Robin McNamara – "Lay a Little Lovin' on Me" (1970)
- The Assembled Multitude – "Overture from Tommy (A Rock Opera)" (1970)
- Mungo Jerry – "In the Summertime" (1970)
- Hotlegs – "Neanderthal Man" (1970)
- Free – "All Right Now" (1970)
- Teegarden and Van Winkle – "God, Love and Rock & Roll" (1970)
- R. Dean Taylor – "Indiana Wants Me" (1970)
- 100 Proof (Aged in Soul) – "Somebody's Been Sleeping" (1970)
- Mashmakhan – "As The Years Go By" (1970)
- Bobby Bloom – "Montego Bay" (1970)
- Christie – "Yellow River" (1970)
- The Presidents – "5-10-15-20 (25-30 Years of Love)" (1970)
- Redeye – "Games" (1971)
- Lynn Anderson – "Rose Garden" (1971)
- Jackie Moore – "Precious, Precious" (1971)
- Liz Damon's Orient Express – "1900 Yesterday" (1971)
- Wadsworth Mansion – "Sweet Mary" (1971)
- Bloodrock – "D.O.A." (1971)
- Sammi Smith – "Help Me Make It Through the Night" (1971)
- Brewer & Shipley – "One Toke Over the Line" (1971)
- The Bells – "Stay Awhile" (1971)
- The Buoys – "Timothy" (1971)
- Ocean – "Put Your Hand in the Hand" (1971)
- Daddy Dewdrop – "Chick-A-Boom (Don't Ya Jes' Love It)" (1971)
- Richie Havens – "Here Comes the Sun" (1971)
- The Fuzz – "I Love You for All Seasons" (1971)
- Matthews Southern Comfort – "Woodstock" (1971)
- Tin Tin – "Toast and Marmalade for Tea" (1971)
- Paul Humphrey & the Cool-Aid Chemists – "Cool Aid" (1971)
- The Beginning of The End – "Funky Nassau" (1971)
- Chase – "Get It On" (1971)
- Sounds of Sunshine – "Love Means (You Never Have to Say You're Sorry)" (1971)
- Cymarron – "Rings" (1971)
- Dave and Ansell Collins – "Double Barrel" (1971)
- Jean Knight – "Mr. Big Stuff" (1971)
- Tom Clay – "What The World Needs Now Is Love/Abraham, Martin and John" (1971)
- Five Man Electrical Band – "Signs" (1971)
- The Undisputed Truth – "Smiling Faces Sometimes" (1971)
- The Glass Bottle – "I Ain't Got Time Anymore" (1971)
- Mac & Katie Kissoon – "Chirpy Chirpy Cheep Cheep" (1971)
- Lee Michaels – "Do You Know What I Mean?" (1971)
- The Stampeders – "Sweet City Woman" (1971)
- Denise LaSalle – "Trapped by a Thing Called Love" (1971)
- The Free Movement – "I've Found Someone of My Own" (1971)
- Freddie Hart – "Easy Loving" (1971)
- Ten Years After – "I'd Love to Change the World" (1971)
- Coven – "One Tin Soldier (The Legend of Billy Jack)" (1971)
- Freddie North – "She's All I Got" (1971)
- Les Crane – "Desiderata" (1971)
- Sweathog – "Hallelujah" (1971)
- Jonathan Edwards – "Sunshine" (1972)
- The Hillside Singers – "I'd Like to Teach the World to Sing (In Perfect Harmony)" (1972)
- Think – "Once You Understand" (1972)
- Bullet – "White Lies, Blue Eyes" (1972)
- Climax – "Precious and Few" (1972)
- Apollo 100 – "Joy" (1972)
- T. Rex – "Bang A Gong (Get It On)" (1972)
- The English Congregation – "Softly Whispering I Love You" (1972)
- The Chakachas – "Jungle Fever" (1972)
- J.J. Cale – "Crazy Mama" (1972)
- Malo – "Suavecito" (1972)
- Jo Jo Gunne – "Run Run Run" (1972)
- Commander Cody and His Lost Planet Airmen – "Hot Rod Lincoln" (1972)
- Royal Scots Dragoon Guards – "Amazing Grace" (1972)
- Frederick Knight – "I've Been Lonely for So Long" (1972)
- Gary Glitter – "Rock and Roll (Part 2)" (1972)
- Mouth and MacNeal – "How Do You Do?" (1972)
- Godspell – "Day by Day" (1972)
- Derek & The Dominos – "Layla" (1972)
- Joey Heatherton – "Gone" (1972)
- Argent – "Hold Your Head Up" (1972)
- Sailcat – "Motorcycle Mama" (1972)
- Flash – "Small Beginnings" (1972)
- Looking Glass – "Brandy (You're a Fine Girl)" (1972)
- Daniel Boone – "Beautiful Sunday" (1972)
- Uriah Heep – "Easy Livin" (1972)
- Hot Butter – "Popcorn" (1972)
- Arlo Guthrie – "City of New Orleans" (1972)
- Emerson, Lake & Palmer – "From the Beginning" (1972)
- Danny O'Keefe – "Good Time Charlie's Got the Blues" (1972)
- Mott the Hoople – "All the Young Dudes" (1972)
- The Delegates – "Convention '72" (1972)
- Chi Coltrane – "Thunder and Lightning" (1972)
- Cashman and West – "American City Suite" (1972)
- Billy Paul – "Me and Mrs. Jones" (1972)
- Blue Haze – "Smoke Gets in Your Eyes" (1973)
- Edward Bear – "Last Song" (1973)
- Brighter Side of Darkness – "Love Jones" (1973)
- Timmy Thomas – "Why Can't We Live Together" (1973)
- Hurricane Smith – "Oh, Babe, What Would You Say?" (1973)
- Eric Weissberg and Steve Mandell – "Dueling Banjos" (1973)
- King Harvest – "Dancing in the Moonlight" (1973)
- Deodato – "Also Sprach Zarathustra (2001)" (1973)
- Loudon Wainwright III – "Dead Skunk" (1973)
- Vicki Lawrence – "The Night the Lights Went Out in Georgia" (1973)
- Lou Reed – "Walk on the Wild Side"/"Perfect Day" (1973)
- Stealers Wheel – "Stuck in the Middle with You" (1973)
- Jud Strunk – "Daisy a Day" (1973)
- John and Ernest – "Super Fly Meets Shaft" (1973)
- Skylark – "Wildflower" (1973)
- Focus – "Hocus Pocus" (1973)
- The Independents – "Leaving Me" (1973)
- Barbara Fairchild – "The Teddy Bear Song" (1973)
- Gunhill Road – "Back When My Hair Was Short" (1973)
- Clint Holmes – "Playground in My Mind" (1973)
- New York City – "I'm Doin' Fine Now" (1973)
- Dr. John – "Right Place, Wrong Time" (1973)
- Fred Wesley & the JB's – "Doing It to Death" (1973)
- Foster Sylvers – "Misdemeanor" (1973)
- Manu Dibango – "Soul Makossa" (1973)
- Stories – "Brother Louie" (1973)
- Sylvia – "Pillow Talk" (1973)
- B. W. Stevenson – "My Maria" (1973)
- Cross Country – "In the Midnight Hour" (1973)
- Ian Thomas – "Painted Ladies" (1974)
- Brownsville Station – "Smokin' in the Boys Room" (1974)
- Byron MacGregor – "Americans" (1974)
- Black Oak Arkansas – "Jim Dandy" (1974)
- Terry Jacks – "Seasons in the Sun" (1974)
- Tom T. Hall – "I Love" (1974)
- Wednesday – "Last Kiss" (1974)
- David Essex – "Rock On" (1974)
- Mocedades – "Eres Tú (Touch the Wind)" (1974)
- Cliff DeYoung – "My Sweet Lady" (1974)
- Rick Derringer – "Rock and Roll, Hoochie Koo" (1974)
- Blue Swede – "Hooked on a Feeling" (1974)
- Redbone – "Come and Get Your Love" (1974)
- Sister Janet Mead – "The Lord's Prayer" (1974)
- MFSB – "TSOP (The Sound of Philadelphia)" (1974)
- Sami Jo – "Tell Me a Lie" (1974)
- Mike Oldfield – "Tubular Bells" (1974)
- Marvin Hamlisch – "The Entertainer" (1974)
- Maria Muldaur – "Midnight at the Oasis" (1974)
- William DeVaughn – "Be Thankful for What You Got" (1974)
- Dave Loggins – "Please Come to Boston" (1974)
- Paper Lace – "The Night Chicago Died" (1974)
- The Rubettes – "Sugar Baby Love" (1974)
- The First Class – "Beach Baby" (1974)
- Johnny Bristol – "Hang On in There Baby" (1974)
- George McCrae – "Rock Your Baby" (1974)
- Souther–Hillman–Furay Band – "Fallin' in Love" (1974)
- Reunion – "Life Is a Rock (But the Radio Rolled Me)" (1974)
- Billy Swan – "I Can Help" (1974)
- Jim Weatherly – "The Need to Be" (1974)
- Prelude – "After the Gold Rush" (1974)
- Carl Douglas – "Kung Fu Fighting" (1974)
- Shirley Brown – "Woman to Woman" (1974)
- Harry Chapin – "Cat's in the Cradle" (1974)
- Carol Douglas – "Doctor's Orders" (1975)
- Polly Brown – "Up in a Puff of Smoke" (1975)
- Sweet Sensation – "Sad Sweet Dreamer" (1975)
- Shirley & Company – "Shame, Shame, Shame" (1975)
- Minnie Riperton – "Loving You" (1975)
- Phoebe Snow – "Poetry Man" (1975)
- Benny Bell – "Shaving Cream" (1975)
- Sammy Johns – "Chevy Van" (1975)
- Kraftwerk – "Autobahn" (1975)
- The Ozark Mountain Daredevils – "Jackie Blue" (1975)
- Ace – "How Long" (1975)
- Jessi Colter – "I'm Not Lisa" (1975)
- Major Harris – "Love Won't Let Me Wait" (1975)
- Pilot – "Magic" (1975)
- Van McCoy – "The Hustle" (1975)
- Gwen McCrae – "Rockin' Chair" (1975)
- Bazuka – "Dynomite" (1975)
- The Amazing Rhythm Aces – "Third Rate Romance" (1975)
- Johnny Wakelin & Kinshasa Band – "Black Superman (Muhammad Ali)" (1975)
- Morris Albert – "Feelings" (1975)
- Pete Wingfield – "Eighteen with a Bullet" (1975)
- Jigsaw – "Sky High" (1975)
- Head East – "Never Been Any Reason" (1975)
- Leon Haywood – "I Want'a Do Something Freaky to You" (1975)
- 5000 Volts – "I'm on Fire" (1975)
- Dwight Twilley Band – "I'm on Fire" (1975)
- C. W. McCall – "Convoy" (1976)
- The Road Apples – "Let's Live Together" (1976)
- Nazareth – "Love Hurts" (1976)
- Cate Brothers – "Union Man" (1976)
- Cledus Maggard & the Citizen's Band – "The White Knight" (1976)
- Larry Groce – "Junk Food Junkie" (1976)
- Roxy Music – "Love Is the Drug" (1976)
- John Sebastian – "Welcome Back" (1976)
- Elvin Bishop – "Fooled Around and Fell in Love" (1976)
- Pratt & McClain – "Happy Days" (1976)
- Henry Gross – "Shannon" (1976)
- Brass Construction – "Movin'" (1976)
- Cyndi Grecco – "Making Our Dreams Come True" (1976)
- Starland Vocal Band – "Afternoon Delight" (1976)
- Andrea True Connection – "More, More, More" (1976)
- Thin Lizzy – "The Boys Are Back in Town" (1976)
- Starbuck – "Moonlight Feels Right" (1976)
- Keith Carradine – "I'm Easy" (1976)
- Vicki Sue Robinson – "Turn the Beat Around" (1976)
- Wild Cherry – "Play That Funky Music" (1976)
- Lady Flash – "Street Singin'" (1976)
- Silver – "Wham Bam" (1976)
- Walter Murphy & The Big Apple Band – "A Fifth of Beethoven" (1976)
- Rick Dees and His Cast of Idiots – "Disco Duck" (1976)
- Norman Connors – "You Are My Starship" (1976)
- John Valenti – "Anything You Want" (1976)
- David Dundas – "Jeans On" (1977)
- Mary MacGregor – "Torn Between Two Lovers" (1977)
- Smokie – "Living Next Door to Alice" (1977)
- Silvetti – "Spring Rain" (1977)
- Cerrone – "Love in C Minor" (1977)
- David Soul – "Don't Give Up on Us" (1977)
- Thelma Houston – "Don't Leave Me This Way" (1977)
- William Bell – "Tryin' to Love Two" (1977)
- Stallion – "Old Fashioned Boy (You're the One)" (1977)
- Starz – "Cherry Baby" (1977)
- Dean Friedman – "Ariel" (1977)
- Alan O'Day – "Undercover Angel" (1977)
- Hot – "Angel in Your Arms" (1977)
- Meri Wilson – "Telephone Man" (1977)
- Slave – "Slide" (1977)
- Ram Jam – "Black Betty" (1977)
- The Floaters – "Float On" (1977)
- Sanford-Townsend Band – "Smoke from a Distant Fire" (1977)
- Meco – "Star Wars Theme/Cantina Band" (1977)
- Debby Boone – "You Light Up My Life" (1977)
- Ronnie McDowell – "The King Is Gone" (1977)
- Dave Mason – "We Just Disagree" (1977)
- Paul Nicholas – "Heaven on the 7th Floor" (1977)
- High Inergy – "You Can't Turn Me Off (In the Middle of Turning Me On)" (1977)
- Randy Newman – "Short People" (1978)
- Santa Esmeralda – "Don't Let Me Be Misunderstood" (1978)
- Odyssey – "Native New Yorker" (1978)
- Samantha Sang – "Emotion" (1978)
- LeBlanc and Carr – "Falling" (1978)
- Stargard – "Theme Song from 'Which Way Is Up'" (1978)
- Rubicon – "I'm Gonna Take Care of Everything" (1978)
- Warren Zevon – "Werewolves of London" (1978)
- Michael Zager Band – "Let's All Chant" (1978)
- Patti Smith Group – "Because the Night" (1978)
- Celebration ft. Mike Love – "Almost Summer" (1978)
- Eruption – "I Can't Stand The Rain" (1978)
- Toby Beau – "My Angel Baby" (1978)
- Steve Martin & The Toot Uncommons – "King Tut" (1978)
- Walter Egan – "Magnet and Steel" (1978)
- Chris Rea – "Fool (If You Think It's Over)" (1978)
- Exile – "Kiss You All Over" (1978)
- John Paul Young – "Love Is in the Air" (1978)
- City Boy – "5.7.0.5." (1978)
- Nick Gilder – "Hot Child in the City" (1978)
- Stonebolt – "I Will Still Love You" (1978)
- Lindisfarne – "Run for Home" (1978)
- Alicia Bridges – "I Love the Nightlife" (1978)
- Ace Frehley – "New York Groove" (1979)
- Chanson – "Don't Hold Back" (1979)
- Cheryl Lynn – "Got to Be Real" (1979)
- Iain Matthews – "Shake It" (1979)
- Nicolette Larson – "Lotta Love" (1979)
- Gloria Gaynor – "I Will Survive" (1979)
- Bobby Caldwell – "What You Won't Do For Love" (1979)
- Giorgio Moroder – "Chase" (1979)
- Amii Stewart – "Knock on Wood" (1979)
- Bell & James – "Livin' It Up (Friday Night)" (1979)
- Rickie Lee Jones – "Chuck E's in Love" (1979)
- Frank Mills – "Music Box Dancer" (1979)
- Ironhorse – "Sweet Lui-Louise" (1979)
- Suzi Quatro & Chris Norman – "Stumblin' In" (1979)
- Tycoon – "Such a Woman" (1979)
- Randy VanWarmer – "Just When I Needed You Most" (1979)
- Roger Voudouris – "Get Used to It" (1979)
- New England – "Don't Ever Wanna Lose Ya" (1979)
- Rex Smith – "You Take My Breath Away" (1979)
- Anita Ward – "Ring My Bell" (1979)
- David Naughton – "Makin' It" (1979)
- McFadden & Whitehead – "Ain't No Stoppin' Us Now" (1979)
- Pink Lady – "Kiss in the Dark" (1979)
- The Jones Girls – "You Gonna Make Me Love Somebody Else" (1979)
- Spyro Gyra – "Morning Dance" (1979)
- Bram Tchaikovsky – "Girl of My Dreams" (1979)
- Herman Brood – "Saturday Night" (1979)
- The Knack – "My Sharona" (1979)
- Nick Lowe – "Cruel to Be Kind" (1979)
- Sniff 'n' the Tears – "Driver's Seat" (1979)
- Patrick Hernandez – "Born to Be Alive" (1979)
- Moon Martin – "Rolene" (1979)
- Ian Gomm – "Hold On" (1979)
- M – "Pop Muzik" (1979)
- The Crusaders – "Street Life" (1979)
- France Joli – "Come To Me" (1979)
- Lauren Wood – "Please Don't Leave" (1979)
- Niteflyte – "If You Want It" (1979)
- JD Souther – "You're Only Lonely" (1979)
- The Buggles – "Video Killed the Radio Star" (1979)

== 1980s ==
- Tom Johnston – "Savannah Nights" (1980)
- The Sugarhill Gang – "Rapper's Delight" (1980)
- Steve Forbert – "Romeo's Tune" (1980)
- The Boomtown Rats – "I Don't Like Mondays" (1980)
- Utopia – "Set Me Free" (1980)
- Felix Cavaliere – "Only a Lonely Heart Sees" (1980)
- Charlie Dore – "Pilot of the Airwaves" (1980)
- Lipps Inc. – "Funkytown" (1980)
- Bernadette Peters – "Gee Whiz" (1980)
- Gary Numan – "Cars" (1980)
- Bruce Cockburn – "Wondering Where the Lions Are" (1980)
- Spider – "New Romance (It's a Mystery)" (1980)
- Rodney Crowell – "Ashes by Now" (1980)
- Robbie Dupree – "Steal Away" (1980)
- Rick Pinette and Oak – "King of the Hill" (1980)
- Change – "A Lover's Holiday" (1980)
- Rocky Burnette – "Tired of Toein' the Line" (1980)
- S.O.S. Band – "Take Your Time (Do It Right)" (1980)
- Fred Knoblock – "Why Not Me" (1980)
- Ali Thomson – "Take a Little Rhythm" (1980)
- Benny Mardones – "Into the Night" (1980)
- Johnny Lee – "Lookin' for Love" (1980)
- Larry Graham – "One in a Million You" (1980)
- Amy Holland – "How Do I Survive" (1980)
- Larsen-Feiten Band – "Who'll Be the Fool Tonight" (1980)
- Devo – "Whip It" (1980)
- Jimmy Hall – "I'm Happy That Love Has Found You" (1980)
- Nielsen/Pearson – "If You Should Sail" (1980)
- Roger Daltrey – "Without Your Love" (1980)
- The Vapors – "Turning Japanese" (1980)
- Don Williams – "I Believe in You" (1980)
- The Korgis – "Everybody's Got to Learn Sometime" (1980)
- Delbert McClinton – "Giving It Up for Your Love" (1981)
- Tierra – "Together" (1981)
- Lakeside – "Fantastic Voyage" (1981)
- Donnie Iris – "Ah! Leah!" (1981)
- Phil Seymour – "Precious to Me" (1981)
- Yarbrough & Peoples – "Don't Stop the Music" (1981)
- Terri Gibbs – "Somebody's Knockin'" (1981)
- Grover Washington Jr. – "Just the Two of Us" (1981)
- Stars on 45 – "Medley" (1981)
- John O'Banion – "Love You Like I Never Loved Before" (1981)
- Get Wet – "Just So Lonely" (1981)
- Franke and the Knockouts – "Sweetheart" (1981)
- Jesse Winchester – "Say What" (1981)
- Lee Ritenour – "Is It You" (1981)
- Carole Bayer Sager – "Stronger Than Before" (1981)
- Roseanne Cash – "Seven Year Ache" (1981)
- Stanley Clarke & George Duke – "Sweet Baby" (1981)
- Joey Scarbury – "Theme from The Greatest American Hero (Believe It or Not)" (1981)
- John Schneider – "It's Now or Never" (1981)
- Frankie Smith – "Double Dutch Bus" (1981)
- Jim Steinman – "Rock and Roll Dreams Come Through" (1981)
- Robbie Patton – "Don't Give It Up" (1981)
- Red Rider – "Lunatic Fringe" (1981)
- Point Blank – "Nicole" (1981)
- Silver Condor – "You Could Take My Heart Away" (1981)
- Balance – "Breaking Away" (1981)
- The Afternoon Delights – "General Hospi-Tale" (1981)
- Diesel – "Sausalito Summernight" (1981)
- Chris Christian – "I Want You, I Need You" (1981)
- Chilliwack – "My Girl (Gone, Gone, Gone)" (1981)
- Steve Carlisle – "WKRP in Cincinnati" (1981)
- The Plimsouls – "A Million Miles Away" (1982)
- Tommy Tutone – "867-5309/Jenny" (1982)
- Sneaker – "More Than Just the Two of Us" (1982)
- Eddie Schwartz – "All Our Tomorrows" (1982)
- Skyy – "Call Me" (1982)
- Prism – "Don't Let Him Know" (1982)
- Buckner and Garcia – "Pac-Man Fever" (1982)
- Bob and Doug McKenzie – "Take Off" (1982)
- Dr. Jeckyll & Mr. Hyde – "Genius Rap" (1982)
- Josie Cotton – "Johnny Are You Queer?" (1982)
- Bertie Higgins – "Key Largo" (1982)
- LeRoux – "Nobody Said It Was Easy" (1982)
- Junior – "Mama Used to Say" (1982)
- Tom Tom Club – "Genius of Love" (1982)
- Greg Guidry – "Goin' Down" (1982)
- Vangelis – "Chariots of Fire" (1982)
- Charlene – "I've Never Been to Me" (1982)
- Bow Wow Wow – "I Want Candy" (1982)
- Aldo Nova – "Fantasy" (1982)
- Chéri – "Murphy's Law" (1982)
- Rainbow – "Stone Cold" (1982)
- Patrice Rushen – "Forget Me Nots" (1982)
- Dazz Band – "Let It Whip" (1982)
- The Monroes – "What Do All The People Know" (1982)
- Soft Cell – "Tainted Love" (1982)
- Larry Elgart and His Manhattan Swing Orchestra – "Hooked on Swing" (1982)
- Eye to Eye – "Nice Girls" (1982)
- The Waitresses – "I Know What Boys Like" (1982)
- Karla Bonoff – "Personally" (1982)
- Haircut One Hundred – "Love Plus One" (1982)
- Leslie Pearl – "If the Love Fits Wear It" (1982)
- Jennifer Holliday – "And I Am Telling You I'm Not Going" (1982)
- Marshall Crenshaw – "Someday, Someway" (1982)
- Frank Zappa – "Valley Girl" (1982)
- Tane Cain – "Holdin' On" (1982)
- A Flock of Seagulls – "I Ran (So Far Away)" (1982)
- Sylvia – "Nobody" (1982)
- Donald Fagen – "I.G.Y. (What a Beautiful World)" (1982)
- Toni Basil – "Mickey" (1982)
- The Weather Girls – "It's Raining Men" (1983)
- Modern English – "I Melt with You" (1983)
- Moving Pictures – "What About Me" (1983)
- Pia Zadora – "Clapping Song" (1983)
- Musical Youth – "Pass The Dutchie" (1983)
- Saga – "On the Loose" (1983)
- Vandenberg – "Burning Heart" (1983)
- Rodney Dangerfield – "Rappin' Rodney" (1983)
- Frida – "I Know There's Something Going On" (1983)
- Toto Coelo – "I Eat Cannibals" (1983)
- Michael Sembello – "Maniac" (1983)
- Dexys Midnight Runners – "Come On Eileen" (1983)
- OXO – "Whirly Girl" (1983)
- After the Fire – "Der Kommissar" (1983)
- Wall of Voodoo – "Mexican Radio" (1983)
- Gary Portnoy – "Where Everybody Knows Your Name" (1983)
- Patrick Simmons – "So Wrong" (1983)
- Thomas Dolby – "She Blinded Me with Science" (1983)
- Robert Ellis Orrall and Carlene Carter – "I Couldn't Say No" (1983)
- Naked Eyes – "(There's) Always Something There to Remind Me" (1983)
- Jim Capaldi – "That's Love" (1983)
- Ebn Ozn – "AEIOU Sometimes Y" (1983)
- Eddy Grant – "Electric Avenue" (1983)
- Kajagoogoo – "Too Shy" (1983)
- Madness – "Our House" (1983)
- Martin Briley – "The Salt in My Tears" (1983)
- Charlie – "It's Inevitable" (1983)
- Taco – "Puttin' On the Ritz" (1983)
- Men Without Hats – "The Safety Dance" (1983)
- Frank Stallone – "Far From Over" (1983)
- Spandau Ballet – "True" (1983)
- Klique – "Stop Doggin' Me Around" (1983)
- Agnetha Fältskog – "Can't Shake Loose" (1983)
- JoBoxers – "Just Got Lucky" (1983)
- Big Country – "In a Big Country" (1983)
- Peter Schilling – "Major Tom (Coming Home)" (1983)
- Matthew Wilder – "Break My Stride" (1984)
- Jump 'n the Saddle Band – "The Curly Shuffle" (1984)
- Deborah Allen – "Baby I Lied" (1984)
- Bronski Beat – "Smalltown Boy" (1984)
- Rockwell – "Somebody's Watching Me" (1984)
- Shannon – "Let the Music Play" (1984)
- Nena – "99 Luftballons/99 Red Balloons" (1984)
- Re-Flex – "The Politics of Dancing" (1984)
- Tracey Ullman – "They Don't Know" (1984)
- Laid Back – "White Horse" (1984)
- Talk Talk – "It's My Life" (1984)
- Nik Kershaw – "Wouldn't It Be Good" (1984)
- The Style Council – "My Ever Changing Moods" (1984)
- The Icicle Works – "Birds Fly (Whisper to a Scream)" (1984)
- Van Stephenson – "Modern Day Delilah" (1984)
- Mike Reno – "Almost Paradise" (1984)
- Face to Face – "10-9-8" (1984)
- Ollie & Jerry – "Breakin'... There's No Stopping Us" (1984)
- Scandal – "The Warrior" (1984)
- Dwight Twilley – "Girls" (1984)
- Twisted Sister – "We're Not Gonna Take It" (1984)
- John Waite – "Missing You" (1984)
- Maria Vidal – "Body Rock" (1984)
- Romeo Void – "A Girl in Trouble (Is a Temporary Thing)" (1984)
- Dennis DeYoung – "Desert Moon" (1984)
- Jennifer Rush – "The Power of Love" (1984)
- Sam Harris – "Sugar Don't Bite" (1984)
- Tommy Shaw – "Girls with Guns" (1984)
- Rebbie Jackson – "Centipede" (1984)
- Jack Wagner – "All I Need" (1985)
- Animotion – "Obsession" (1985)
- Philip Bailey – "Easy Lover" (1985)
- Giuffria – "Call to the Heart" (1985)
- Midnight Star – "Operator" (1985)
- John Hunter – "Tragedy" (1985)
- General Public – "Tenderness" (1985)
- Murray Head – "One Night in Bangkok" (1985)
- Frankie Goes to Hollywood – "Relax" (1985)
- Autograph – "Turn Up the Radio" (1985)
- USA for Africa – "We Are the World" (1985)
- The Firm – "Radioactive" (1985)
- Robin George – "Heartline" (1985)
- Eddie Murphy – "Party All the Time" (1985)
- Harold Faltermeyer – "Axel F" (1985)
- Alison Moyet – "Invisible" (1985)
- Mary Jane Girls – "In My House" (1985)
- Limahl – "The NeverEnding Story" (1985)
- Graham Parker & the Shot – "Wake Up (Next to You)" (1985)
- Katrina and the Waves – "Walking on Sunshine" (1985)
- John Parr – "St. Elmo's Fire (Man in Motion)" (1985)
- 'Til Tuesday – "Voices Carry" (1985)
- Paul Hardcastle – "19" (1985)
- Cock Robin – "When Your Heart is Weak" (1985)
- Dead or Alive – "You Spin Me Round (Like a Record)" (1985)
- Billy Crystal – "You Look Marvelous" (1985)
- Godley & Creme – "Cry" (1985)
- Jan Hammer – "Miami Vice Theme" (1985)
- Kate Bush – "Running Up That Hill" (1985)
- Starpoint – "Object of My Desire" (1985)
- Scritti Politti – "Perfect Way" (1985)
- Clarence Clemons – "You're a Friend of Mine" (1986)
- Ta Mara and the Seen – "Everybody Dance" (1986)
- The Dream Academy – "Life in a Northern Town" (1986)
- Baltimora – "Tarzan Boy" (1986)
- Charlie Sexton – "Beat's So Lonely" (1986)
- Robert Tepper – "No Easy Way Out" (1986)
- Falco – "Rock Me Amadeus" (1986)
- Opus – "Live Is Life" (1986)
- Sly Fox – "Let's Go All The Way" (1986)
- Force MDs – "Tender Love" (1986)
- Honeymoon Suite – "Feel It Again" (1986)
- The Outfield – "Your Love" (1986)
- Nu Shooz – "I Can't Wait" (1986)
- Boys Don't Cry – "I Wanna Be a Cowboy" (1986)
- Models – "Out of Mind, Out of Sight" (1986)
- The Fabulous Thunderbirds – "Tuff Enuff" (1986)
- Stacey Q – "Two of Hearts" (1986)
- GTR – "When the Heart Rules the Mind" (1986)
- The Blow Monkeys – "Digging Your Scene" (1986)
- Device – "Hanging on a Heart Attack" (1986)
- Jermaine Stewart – "We Don't Have to Take Our Clothes Off" (1986)
- Timex Social Club – "Rumors" (1986)
- Gavin Christopher – "One Step Closer to You" (1986)
- Regina – "Baby Love" (1986)
- Berlin – "Take My Breath Away" (1986)
- Double – "Captain of Her Heart" (1986)
- Gloria Loring – "Friends and Lovers" (1986)
- Don Johnson – "Heartbeat" (1986)
- Oran "Juice" Jones – "The Rain" (1986)
- Ric Ocasek – "Emotion in Motion" (1986)
- David & David – "Welcome to the Boomtown" (1986)
- Timbuk 3 – "The Future's So Bright, I Gotta Wear Shades" (1986)
- Nancy Martinez – "For Tonight" (1986)
- Robbie Nevil – "C'est La Vie" (1987)
- Gregory Abbott – "Shake You Down" (1987)
- Billy Vera – "At This Moment" (1987)
- Benjamin Orr – "Stay The Night" (1987)
- The Georgia Satellites – "Keep Your Hands to Yourself" (1987)
- Chico DeBarge – "Talk to Me" (1987)
- Jeff Lorber ft. Karyn White – "Facts of Love" (1987)
- Bruce Willis – "Respect Yourself" (1987)
- Cutting Crew – "(I Just) Died in Your Arms" (1987)
- The Communards – "Don't Leave Me This Way" (1987)
- Club Nouveau – "Lean on Me" (1987)
- XTC – "Dear God" (1987)
- Hipsway – "The Honeythief" (1987)
- Robert Cray Band – "Smoking Gun" (1987)
- World Party – "Ship of Fools" (1987)
- Donna Allen – "Serious" (1987)
- Chris de Burgh – "The Lady in Red" (1987)
- The Psychedelic Furs – "Heartbreak Beat" (1987)
- Breakfast Club – "Right on Track" (1987)
- Company B – "Fascinated" (1987)
- Paul Lekakis – "Boom Boom (Let's Go Back to My Room)" (1987)
- The System – "Don't Disturb This Groove" (1987)
- Pseudo Echo – "Funkytown" (1987)
- The Nylons – "Kiss Him Goodbye" (1987)
- Yello – "Oh Yeah" (1987)
- T'Pau – "Heart and Soul" (1987)
- Living in a Box – "Living in a Box" (1987)
- Danny Wilson – "Mary's Prayer" (1987)
- Pretty Poison – "Catch Me (I'm Falling)" (1987)
- The Other Ones – "Holiday" (1987)
- LeVert – "Casanova" (1987)
- Timothy B. Schmit – "Boys Night Out" (1987)
- Wa Wa Nee – "Sugar Free" (1987)
- Swing Out Sister – "Breakout" (1987)
- Bill Medley and Jennifer Warnes – "(I've Had) The Time of My Life" (1987)
- Bourgeois Tagg – "I Don't Mind At All" (1987)
- Kane Gang – "Motortown" (1987)
- Stryper – "Honestly" (1988)
- Buster Poindexter – "Hot Hot Hot" (1988)
- Roger – "I Want to Be Your Man" (1988)
- MARRS – "Pump Up The Volume" (1988)
- Patrick Swayze – "She's Like the Wind" (1988)
- Scarlett & Black – "You Don't Know" (1988)
- Morris Day – "Fishnet" (1988)
- Bryan Ferry – "Kiss and Tell" (1988)
- Dan Reed Network – "Ritual" (1988)
- Suave – "My Girl" (1988)
- Johnny Hates Jazz – "Shattered Dreams" (1988)
- The Deele – "Two Occasions" (1988)
- Times Two – "Strange but True" (1988)
- E.U. – "Da' Butt" (1988)
- Brenda K. Starr – "I Still Believe" (1988)
- Bardeux – "When We Kiss" (1988)
- Brenda Russell – "Piano in the Dark" (1988)
- The Church – "Under the Milky Way" (1988)
- J.J. Fad – "Supersonic" (1988)
- Midnight Oil – "Beds Are Burning" (1988)
- Ziggy Marley and The Melody Makers – "Tomorrow People" (1988)
- Al B. Sure! – "Nite and Day" (1988)
- Jane Wiedlin – "Rush Hour" (1988)
- Climie Fisher – "Love Changes (Everything)" (1988)
- Johnny Kemp – "Just Got Paid" (1988)
- Denise Lopez – "Sayin' Sorry (Don't Make It Right)" (1988)
- Bobby McFerrin – "Don't Worry, Be Happy" (1988)
- Information Society – "What's On Your Mind (Pure Energy)" (1988)
- Rob Base & DJ E-Z Rock – "It Takes Two" (1988)
- Giant Steps – "Another Lover" (1988)
- Vixen – "Edge of a Broken Heart" (1988)
- Will to Power – "Baby, I Love Your Way/Freebird Medley" (1988)
- When in Rome – "The Promise" (1988)
- Ivan Neville – "Not Just Another Girl" (1988)
- Judson Spence – "Yeah, Yeah, Yeah" (1988)
- Boy Meets Girl – "Waiting for a Star to Fall" (1988)
- Boys Club – "I Remember Holding You" (1989)
- Sheriff – "When I'm with You" (1989)
- Edie Brickell & New Bohemians – "What I Am" (1989)
- Kon Kan – "I Beg Your Pardon (I Never Promised You a Rose Garden)" (1989)
- Michael Damian – "Rock On" (1989)
- Was (Not Was) – "Walk the Dinosaur" (1989)
- Sa-Fire – "Thinking of You" (1989)
- The Belle Stars – "Iko Iko" (1989)
- One 2 Many – "Downtown" (1989)
- Jimmy Harnen with Synch – "Where Are You Now?" (1989)
- Roachford – "Cuddly Toy" (1989)
- Waterfront – "Cry" (1989)
- Neneh Cherry – "Buffalo Stance" (1989)
- Martika – "Toy Soldiers" (1989)
- De La Soul – "Me Myself and I" (1989)
- Love and Rockets – "So Alive" (1989)
- Jeff Healey – "Angel Eyes" (1989)
- Grayson Hugh – "Talk It Over" (1989)
- Young MC – "Bust a Move" (1989)
- Sybil – "Don't Make Me Over" (1989)
- Kix – "Don't Close Your Eyes" (1989)

== 1990s ==
- Jive Bunny & The Mastermixers – "Swing the Mood" (1990)
- Shana – "I Want You" (1990)
- Technotronic – "Pump Up the Jam" (1990)
- Biz Markie – "Just a Friend" (1990)
- D Mob ft. Cathy Dennis – "C'mon and Get My Love" (1990)
- Alannah Myles – "Black Velvet" (1990)
- Michael Penn – "No Myth" (1990)
- The Brat Pack – "You're the Only Woman" (1990)
- Jane Child – "Don't Wanna Fall in Love" (1990)
- The U-Krew – "If U Were Mine" (1990)
- Sinéad O'Connor – "Nothing Compares 2 U" (1990)
- A'Me Lorain – "Whole Wide World" (1990)
- Calloway – "I Wanna Be Rich" (1990)
- Faster Pussycat – "House of Pain" (1990)
- Electronic – "Getting Away With It" (1990)
- Perfect Gentlemen – "Ooh La La (I Can't Get Over You)" (1990)
- Digital Underground – "The Humpty Dance" (1990)
- Partners in Kryme – "Turtle Power!" (1990)
- Giant – "I'll See You in My Dreams" (1990)
- Whistle – "Always and Forever" (1990)
- Brent Bourgeois – "Dare to Fall in Love" (1990)
- L.A. Guns – "The Ballad of Jayne" (1990)
- Louie Louie – "Sittin' in the Lap of Luxury" (1990)
- Nikki – "Notice Me" (1990)
- Mellow Man Ace – "Mentirosa" (1990)
- George Lamond – "Bad of the Heart" (1990)
- The Lightning Seeds – "Pure" (1990)
- Tyler Collins – "Girls Nite Out" (1990)
- Brother Beyond – "The Girl I Used to Know" (1990)
- Kyper – "Tic-Tac-Toe" (1990)
- Faith No More – "Epic" (1990)
- Indecent Obsession – "Tell Me Something" (1990)
- The Adventures of Stevie V – "Dirty Cash (Money Talks)" (1990)
- Vanilla Ice – "Ice Ice Baby" (1990)
- Candyman – "Knockin' Boots" (1990)
- Concrete Blonde – "Joey" (1990)
- Deee-Lite – "Groove Is in the Heart" (1990)
- Soho – "Hippychick" (1990)
- 2 in a Room – "Wiggle It" (1990)
- DNA – "Tom's Diner" (1990)
- Iggy Pop – "Candy" (1991)
- Urban Dance Squad – "Deeper Shade of Soul" (1991)
- Chris Isaak – "Wicked Game" (1991)
- Timmy T – "One More Try" (1991)
- Oleta Adams – "Get Here" (1991)
- Father M.C. – "I'll Do 4 U" (1991)
- Susanna Hoffs – "My Side of the Bed" (1991)
- Lisette Melendez – "Together Forever" (1991)
- Londonbeat – "I've Been Thinking About You" (1991)
- Gerardo – "Rico Suave" (1991)
- Mr. Big – "To Be With You" (1991)
- Bingoboys ft. Princessa – "How to Dance" (1991)
- Harriet – "Temple of Love" (1991)
- Keedy – "Save Some Love" (1991)
- Monie Love – "It's a Shame (My Sister)" (1991)
- Divinyls – "I Touch Myself" (1991)
- The Triplets – "You Don't Have to Go Home Tonight" (1991)
- Riff – "My Heart Is Failing Me" (1991)
- LaTour – "People Are Still Having Sex" (1991)
- Queensrÿche – "Silent Lucidity" (1991)
- The Rude Boys – "Written All Over Your Face" (1991)
- Kane Roberts – "Does Anybody Really Fall in Love Anymore?" (1991)
- Lisa Fischer – "How Can I Ease the Pain" (1991)
- Marc Cohn – "Walking in Memphis" (1991)
- Steelheart – "I'll Never Let You Go (Angel Eyes)" (1991)
- Yo-Yo – "You Can't Play with My Yo-Yo" (1991)
- David A. Stewart ft. Candy Dulfer – "Lily Was Here" (1991)
- Keith Washington – "Kissing You" (1991)
- EMF – "Unbelievable" (1991)
- The La's – "There She Goes" (1991)
- Corina – "Temptation" (1991)
- Desmond Child – "Love on a Rooftop" (1991)
- 3rd Bass – "Pop Goes the Weasel" (1991)
- Jomanda – "Got a Love for You" (1991)
- TAMI Show – "The Truth" (1991)
- Tim Dog – "Fuck Compton" (1991)
- Natural Selection – "Do Anything" (1991)
- Siouxsie and the Banshees – "Kiss Them for Me" (1991)
- Billy Falcon – "Power Windows" (1991)
- Chesney Hawkes – "The One and Only" (1991)
- Jasmine Guy – "Just Want to Hold You" (1991)
- Russ Irwin – "My Heart Belongs to You" (1991)
- Tony Terry – "With You" (1991)
- Big Audio Dynamite II – "Rush" (1991)
- Curtis Stigers – "I Wonder Why" (1991)
- Angelica – "Angel Baby" (1992)
- The Party – "In My Dreams" (1992)
- The Storm – "I've Got a Lot to Learn About Love" (1992)
- Kym Sims – "Too Blind to See It" (1992)
- Right Said Fred – "I'm Too Sexy" (1992)
- A Lighter Shade of Brown – "On a Sunday Afternoon" (1992)
- The Shamen – "Move Any Mountain (Progen 91)" (1992)
- RTZ – "Until Your Love Comes Back Around" (1992)
- MC Brains – "Oochie Coochie" (1992)
- Kris Kross – "Jump" (1992)
- Kathy Troccoli – "Everything Changes" (1992)
- Chris Walker – "Take Time" (1992)
- Cause and Effect – "You Think You Know Her" (1992)
- Joe Public – "Live and Learn" (1992)
- Lidell Townsell – "Nu Nu" (1992)
- Sir Mix-a-Lot – "Baby Got Back" (1992)
- Billy Ray Cyrus – "Achy Breaky Heart" (1992)
- Das EFX – "They Want EFX" (1992)
- Rozalla – "Everybody's Free (To Feel Good)" (1992)
- Tom Cochrane – "Life Is a Highway" (1992)
- Shakespears Sister – "Stay" (1992)
- The Soup Dragons – "Divine Thing" (1992)
- House of Pain – "Jump Around" (1992)
- k.d lang – "Constant Craving" (1992)
- K.W.S. – "Please Don't Go" (1992)
- Charles & Eddie – "Would I Lie To You?" (1992)
- The Heights – "How Do You Talk to an Angel" (1992)
- Trey Lorenz – "Someone to Hold" (1992)
- Saigon Kick – "Love Is On the Way" (1992)
- Wreckx-n-Effect – "Rump Shaker" (1992)
- Mad Cobra – "Flex" (1993)
- N2Deep – "Back to the Hotel" (1993)
- Dan Baird – "I Love You Period" (1993)
- The S.O.U.L. S.Y.S.T.E.M. ft. Michelle Visage – "It's Gonna Be a Lovely Day" (1993)
- Lo-Key? – "I Got a Thang 4 Ya!" (1993)
- Portrait – "Here We Go Again!" (1993)
- Boy Krazy – "That's What Love Can Do" (1993)
- Digable Planets – "Rebirth of Slick (Cool Like Dat)" (1993)
- Snow – "Informer" (1993)
- Positive K – "I Got a Man" (1993)
- Paperboy – "Ditty" (1993)
- Sunscreem – "Love U More" (1993)
- Joey Lawrence – "Nothin' My Love Can't Fix" (1993)
- Tasmin Archer – "Sleeping Satellite" (1993)
- Robin S. – "Show Me Love" (1993)
- Green Jellÿ – "Three Little Pigs" (1993)
- Captain Hollywood Project – "More and More" (1993)
- Duice – "Dazzey Duks" (1993)
- Tag Team – "Whoomp! (There It Is)" (1993)
- U.N.V. – "Something's Goin' On" (1993)
- 95 South – "Whoot, There It Is" (1993)
- 4 Non Blondes – "What's Up?" (1993)
- Fu-Schnickens – "What's Up Doc? (Can We Rock)" (1993)
- The Proclaimers – "I'm Gonna Be (500 Miles)" (1993)
- Onyx – "Slam" (1993)
- Soul Asylum – "Runaway Train" (1993)
- Cypress Hill – "Insane in the Brain" (1993)
- Haddaway – "What Is Love" (1993)
- Blind Melon – "No Rain" (1993)
- Intro – "Come Inside" (1993)
- DRS – "Gangsta Lean" (1993)
- K7 – "Come Baby Come" (1993)
- Culture Beat – "Mr. Vain" (1994)
- Gabrielle – "Dreams" (1994)
- Queen Latifah – "U.N.I.T.Y." (1994)
- The Breeders – "Cannonball" (1994)
- Us3 – "Cantaloop (Flip Fantasia)" (1994)
- Eternal – "Stay" (1994)
- Crash Test Dummies – "Mmm Mmm Mmm Mmm" (1994)
- 12 Gauge – "Dunkie Butt" (1994)
- Beck – "Loser" (1994)
- Masta Ace Incorporated – "Born to Roll" (1994)
- Big Mountain – "Baby, I Love Your Way" (1994)
- M People – "Moving On Up" (1994)
- Ahmad – "Back in the Day" (1994)
- Lisa Loeb – "Stay (I Missed You)" (1994)
- The Puppies – "Funky Y-2-C" (1994)
- Public Enemy – "Give It Up" (1994)
- The Lady of Rage – "Afro Puffs" (1994)
- Meshell Ndegeocello – "Wild Night" (1994)
- Candlebox – "Far Behind" (1994)
- Lucas – "Lucas with the Lid Off" (1994)
- Craig Mack – "Flava in Ya Ear" (1994)
- B.M.U. (Black Men United) – "U Will Know" (1994)
- Ini Kamoze – "Here Comes the Hotstepper" (1994)
- 69 Boyz – "Tootsee Roll" (1995)
- Scatman John – "Scatman (Ski-Ba-Bop-Ba-Dop-Bop)" (1995)
- 20 Fingers ft. Gillette – "Short Dick Man" (1995)
- Deadeye Dick – "New Age Girl" (1995)
- Corona – "The Rhythm of the Night" (1995)
- 4 P.M. – "Sukiyaki" (1995)
- Andru Donalds – "Mishale" (1995)
- N II U – "I Miss You" (1995)
- Des'ree – "You Gotta Be" (1995)
- 2 Unlimited – "Get Ready for This" (1995)
- Subway – "This Lil' Game We Play" (1995)
- Jamie Walters – "Hold On" (1995)
- Dionne Farris – "I Know" (1995)
- Adina Howard – "Freak like Me" (1995)
- Martin Page – "In the House of Stone and Light" (1995)
- Rednex – "Cotton Eye Joe" (1995)
- Kut Klose – "I Like" (1995)
- Nicki French – "Total Eclipse of the Heart" (1995)
- Better Than Ezra – "Good" (1995)
- MoKenStef – "He's Mine" (1995)
- Skee-Lo – "I Wish" (1995)
- Luniz ft. Michael Marshall – "I Got 5 on It" (1995)
- AZ – "Sugar Hill" (1995)
- Silverchair – "Tomorrow" (1995)
- The Rembrandts – "I'll Be There For You" (1995)
- Del Amitri – "Roll to Me" (1995)
- Groove Theory – "Tell Me" (1995)
- Take That – "Back for Good" (1995)
- Edwyn Collins – "A Girl Like You" (1995)
- Toadies – "Possum Kingdom" (1995)
- Deep Blue Something – "Breakfast at Tiffany's" (1996)
- Joan Osborne – "One of Us" (1996)
- The Folk Implosion – "Natural One" (1996)
- Everything but the Girl – "Missing" (1996)
- 3T – "Anything" (1996)
- Seven Mary Three – "Cumbersome" (1996)
- Oasis – "Wonderwall" (1996)
- The Tony Rich Project – "Nobody Knows" (1996)
- Lina Santiago – "Feels So Good (Show Me Your Love)" (1996)
- Chantay Savage – "I Will Survive" (1996)
- The Nixons – "Sister" (1996)
- Nonchalant – "5 O'Clock" (1996)
- Spacehog – "In the Meantime" (1996)
- BoDeans – "Closer to Free" (1996)
- Tina Arena – "Chains" (1996)
- Jann Arden – "Insensitive" (1996)
- Dog's Eye View – "Everything Falls Apart" (1996)
- Jars of Clay – "Flood" (1996)
- Tracy Bonham – "Mother Mother" (1996)
- Delinquent Habits – "Tres Delinquentes" (1996)
- Crucial Conflict – "Hay" (1996)
- Robert Miles – "Children" (1996)
- Butthole Surfers – "Pepper" (1996)
- Los Del Rio – "Macarena" (1996)
- Quad City DJ's – "C'mon N' Ride It (The Train)" (1996)
- Dishwalla – "Counting Blue Cars" (1996)
- Ghost Town DJ's – "My Boo" (1996)
- Donna Lewis – "I Love You Always Forever" (1996)
- Mista – "Blackberry Molasses" (1996)
- Primitive Radio Gods – "Standing Outside a Broken Phone Booth with Money in My Hand" (1996)
- Eels – "Novocaine for the Soul" (1996)
- Merril Bainbridge – "Mouth" (1996)
- Camp Lo – "Luchini AKA This Is It" (1997)
- Gina G – "Ooh Aah... Just a Little Bit" (1997)
- The Blackout All-Stars – "I Like It" (1997)
- The Cardigans – "Lovefool" (1997)
- Tracey Lee – "The Theme (It's Party Time)" (1997)
- The Prodigy – "Firestarter" (1997)
- DJ Kool – "Let Me Clear My Throat" (1997)
- Luscious Jackson – "Naked Eye" (1997)
- B-Rock and the Bizz – "My Baby Daddy" (1997)
- White Town – "Your Woman" (1997)
- Duncan Sheik – "Barely Breathing" (1997)
- Freak Nasty – "Da' Dip" (1997)
- The Wallflowers – "One Headlight" (1997)
- Hanson – "MMMBop" (1997)
- Mark Morrison – "Return of the Mack" (1997)
- The Verve Pipe – "The Freshmen" (1997)
- Bob Carlisle – "Butterfly Kisses" (1997)
- Raybon Brothers – "Butterfly Kisses" (1997)
- Meredith Brooks – "Bitch" (1997)
- OMC – "How Bizarre" (1997)
- Shawn Colvin – "Sunny Came Home" (1997)
- Sister Hazel – "All for You" (1997)
- Aqua – "Barbie Girl" (1997)
- Mr. President – "Coco Jamboo" (1997)
- Peach Union – "On My Own" (1997)
- The Mighty Mighty Bosstones – "The Impression That I Get" (1997)
- Imani Coppola – "Legend of a Cowgirl" (1997)
- Allure – "All Cried Out" (1997)
- Somethin' for the People – "My Love Is the Shhh!" (1997)
- Chumbawamba – "Tubthumping" (1997)
- Fiona Apple – "Criminal" (1997)
- LSG – "My Body" (1997)
- Tonic – "If You Could Only See" (1997)
- She Moves – "Breaking All The Rules" (1997)
- Nu Flavor – "Heaven" (1998)
- Alana Davis – "32 Flavors" (1998)
- Uncle Sam – "I Don't Ever Want to See You Again" (1998)
- Billie Myers – "Kiss the Rain" (1998)
- Ben Folds Five – "Brick" (1998)
- K.P. & Envyi – "Swing My Way" (1998)
- Jimmy Ray – "Are You Jimmy Ray?" (1998)
- Loreena McKennitt – "The Mummers' Dance" (1998)
- Lord Tariq and Peter Gunz – "Deja Vu (Uptown Baby)" (1998)
- The Verve – "Bitter Sweet Symphony" (1998)
- Sylk-E. Fyne ft. Chill – "Romeo and Juliet" (1998)
- Marcy Playground – "Sex and Candy" (1998)
- Canibus – "Second Round K.O." (1998)
- Playa – "Cheers 2 U" (1998)
- Link – "Whatcha Gone Do?" (1998)
- Imajin ft. Keith Murray – "Shorty (You Keep Playin' with My Mind)" (1998)
- Jimmy Page – "Come With Me" (1998)
- Nicole ft. Mocha – "Make It Hot" (1998)
- Five – "When the Lights Go Out" (1998)
- Cleopatra – "Cleopatra's Theme" (1998)
- Pras – "Ghetto Supastar" (1998)
- Semisonic – "Closing Time" (1998)
- Harvey Danger – "Flagpole Sitta" (1998)
- Jennifer Paige – "Crush" (1998)
- Tatyana Ali – "Daydreamin'" (1998)
- Pressha – "Splackavellie" (1998)
- The Brian Setzer Orchestra – "Jump, Jive an' Wail" (1998)
- TQ – "Westside" (1998)
- Everything – "Hooch" (1998)
- Divine – "Lately" (1998)
- Natalie Imbruglia – "Torn" (1998)
- Eve 6 – "Inside Out" (1998)
- Shawn Mullins – "Lullaby" (1999)
- Eagle-Eye Cherry – "Save Tonight" (1999)
- New Radicals – "You Get What You Give" (1999)
- Jesse Powell – "You" (1999)
- Joey McIntyre – "Stay the Same" (1999)
- B*Witched – "C'est la Vie" (1999)
- Baz Luhrmann – "Everybody's Free (To Wear Sunscreen)" (1999)
- Vengaboys – "We Like to Party!" (1999)
- Sixpence None the Richer – "Kiss Me" (1999)
- Jordan Knight – "Give It to You" (1999)
- Everlast – "What It's Like" (1999)
- JT Money – "Who Dat" (1999)
- Fatboy Slim – "Praise You" (1999)
- Lit – "My Own Worst Enemy" (1999)
- Sporty Thievz – "No Pigeons" (1999)
- Eric Benét – "Spend My Life with You" (1999)
- Citizen King – "Better Days (And the Bottom Drops Out)" (1999)
- LFO – "Summer Girls" (1999)
- Tal Bachman – "She's So High" (1999)
- Chely Wright – "Single White Female" (1999)
- Garth Brooks as Chris Gaines – "Lost in You" (1999)
- Lil' Troy – "Wanna Be a Baller" (1999)
- Lou Bega – "Mambo No. 5" (1999)
- Len – "Steal My Sunshine" (1999)
- B.G. – "Bling Bling" (1999)
- Ideal – "Get Gone" (1999)
- Kevon Edmonds – "24/7" (1999)
- Marc Nelson – "15 Minutes" (1999)

== 2000s ==
- M2M – "Don't Say You Love Me" (2000)
- Eiffel 65 – "Blue (Da Ba Dee)" (2000)
- Filter – "Take a Picture" (2000)
- J-Shin ft. LaTocha Scott – "One Night Stand" (2000)
- The Product G&B – "Maria Maria" (2000)
- Hoku – "Another Dumb Blonde" (2000)
- Bloodhound Gang – "The Bad Touch" (2000)
- Sonique – "It Feels So Good" (2000)
- 504 Boyz – "Wobble Wobble" (2000)
- Carl Thomas – "I Wish" (2000)
- Mary Mary – "Shackles (Praise You)" (2000)
- Macy Gray – "I Try" (2000)
- Alice Deejay – "Better Off Alone" (2000)
- Westlife – "Swear It Again" (2000)
- Chad Brock – "Yes!" (2000)
- Wheatus – "Teenage Dirtbag" (2000)
- Nine Days – "Absolutely (Story of a Girl)" (2000)
- SR-71 – "Right Now" (2000)
- BBMak – "Back Here" (2000)
- Lucy Pearl – "Dance Tonight" (2000)
- Son by Four – "Purest of Pain (A Puro Dolor)" (2000)
- Zombie Nation – "Kernkraft 400" (2000)
- Ruff Endz – "No More" (2000)
- Billy Gilman – "One Voice" (2000)
- soulDecision – "Faded" (2000)
- Aaron Carter – "Aaron's Party (Come Get It)" (2000)
- Kandi – "Don't Think I'm Not" (2000)
- Baha Men – "Who Let the Dogs Out?" (2000)
- Profyle – "Liar" (2000)
- Samantha Mumba – "Gotta Tell You" (2000)
- Dream – "He Loves U Not" (2000)
- Debelah Morgan – "Dance with Me" (2001)
- Mikaila – "So in Love with Two" (2001)
- DJ Casper AKA Mr C The Slide Man – "Cha Cha Slide" (2001)
- Lee Ann Womack – "I Hope You Dance" (2001)
- Evan and Jaron – "Crazy for This Girl" (2001)
- Crazy Town – "Butterfly" (2001)
- Eden's Crush – "Get Over Yourself" (2001)
- ATC – "Around the World (La La La La La)" (2001)
- Modjo – "Lady (Hear Me Tonight)" (2001)
- 3LW – "No More (Baby I'ma Do Right)" (2001)
- Jessica Andrews – "Who I Am" (2001)
- The Corrs – "Breathless" (2001)
- S Club 7 – "Never Had a Dream Come True" (2001)
- Sunshine Anderson – "Heard It All Before" (2001)
- City High – "What Would You Do?" (2001)
- Moby – "South Side" (2001)
- Lil Romeo – "My Baby" (2001)
- Blu Cantrell – "Hit 'Em Up Style (Oops!)" (2001)
- Jimmy Cozier – "She's All I Got" (2001)
- American Hi-Fi – "Flavor of the Weak" (2001)
- Incubus – "Drive" (2001)
- Willa Ford – "I Wanna Be Bad" (2001)
- Darude – "Sandstorm" (2001)
- The Wiseguys – "Start the Commotion" (2001)
- Afroman – "Because I Got High" (2001)
- Cyndi Thomson – "What I Really Meant to Say" (2001)
- Lee Greenwood – "God Bless the U.S.A." (2001)
- Alien Ant Farm – "Smooth Criminal" (2001)
- Toya – "I Do!!" (2001)
- The Calling – "Wherever You Will Go" (2002)
- Mr. Cheeks – "Lights, Camera, Action!" (2002)
- Glenn Lewis – "Don't You Forget It" (2002)
- P.O.D. – "Youth of the Nation" (2002)
- Phantom Planet – "California" (2002)
- Tweet – "Oops (Oh My)" (2002)
- Tommy Shane Steiner – "What If She's an Angel" (2002)
- Vanessa Carlton – "A Thousand Miles" (2002)
- Steve Azar – "I Don't Have to Be Me ('til Monday)" (2002)
- Truth Hurts – "Addictive" (2002)
- Default – "Wasting My Time" (2002)
- Jimmy Eat World – "The Middle" (2002)
- Dirty Vegas – "Days Go By" (2002)
- Big Tymers – "Still Fly" (2002)
- Khia – "My Neck, My Back (Lick It)" (2002)
- DJ Sammy – "Heaven" (2002)
- Angie Martinez ft. Sacario – "If I Could Go!" (2002)
- Las Ketchup – "The Ketchup Song (Aserejé)" (2002)
- Lasgo – "Something" (2003)
- Aaron Lines – "You Can't Hide Beautiful" (2003)
- Smilez and Southstar – "Tell Me" (2003)
- JC Chasez – "Blowin' Me Up (With Her Love)" (2003)
- Fountains of Wayne – "Stacy's Mom" (2003)
- t.A.T.u. – "All The Things She Said" (2003)
- Norah Jones – "Don't Know Why" (2003)
- Amanda Perez – "Angel" (2003)
- Wayne Wonder – "No Letting Go" (2003)
- Bone Crusher – "Never Scared" (2003)
- Lumidee – "Never Leave You (Uh Oooh, Uh Oooh)" (2003)
- Junior Senior – "Move Your Feet" (2003)
- The Ataris – "The Boys of Summer" (2003)
- YoungBloodZ – "Damn!" (2003)
- Trapt – "Headstrong" (2003)
- Pat Green – "Wave on Wave" (2003)
- Fefe Dobson – "Take Me Away" (2003)
- Stacie Orrico – "(There's Gotta Be) More to Life" (2003)
- Liz Phair – "Why Can't I?" (2003)
- Nick Cannon – "Gigolo" (2004)
- Eamon – "Fuck It (I Don't Want You Back)" (2004)
- The Darkness – "I Believe in a Thing Called Love" (2004)
- Cassidy – "Hotel" (2004)
- J-Kwon – "Tipsy" (2004)
- Mario Winans – "I Don't Wanna Know" (2004)
- Lustra – "Scotty Doesn't Know" (2004)
- Jet – "Are You Gonna Be My Girl" (2004)
- Hoobastank – "The Reason" (2004)
- Yellowcard – "Ocean Avenue" (2004)
- Mis-Teeq – "Scandalous" (2004)
- Diana DeGarmo – "Dreams" (2004)
- Nina Sky – "Move Ya Body" (2004)
- Kevin Lyttle – "Turn Me On" (2004)
- Houston – "I Like That" (2004)
- Terror Squad – "Lean Back" (2004)
- Los Lonely Boys – "Heaven" (2004)
- O-Zone – "Dragostea Din Tei" (2004)
- Modest Mouse – "Float On" (2004)
- Franz Ferdinand – "Take Me Out" (2004)
- Bowling for Soup – "1985" (2004)
- Rupee – "Tempted to Touch" (2004)
- Seether ft. Amy Lee – "Broken" (2004)
- Josh Gracin – "Nothin' To Lose" (2005)
- Trillville – "Some Cut" (2005)
- Caesars – "Jerk It Out" (2005)
- Amerie – "1 Thing" (2005)
- Brooke Valentine – "Girlfight" (2005)
- System of a Down – "B.Y.O.B." (2005)
- Howie Day – "Collide" (2005)
- Bo Bice – "Inside Your Heaven" (2005)
- Natalie – "Goin' Crazy" (2005)
- D.H.T. – "Listen to Your Heart" (2005)
- The Click Five – "Just the Girl" (2005)
- Crazy Frog – "Axel F" (2005)
- Cast of Rent – "Seasons of Love" (2005)
- D4L – "Laffy Taffy" (2006)
- James Blunt – "You're Beautiful" (2006)
- Daniel Powter – "Bad Day" (2006)
- Nick Lachey – "What's Left of Me" (2006)
- Teddy Geiger – "For You I Will (Confidence)" (2006)
- Saving Jane – "Girl Next Door" (2006)
- Chamillionaire – "Ridin'" (2006)
- Fort Minor ft. Holly Brook – "Where'd You Go" (2006)
- AFI – "Miss Murder" (2006)
- The Wreckers – "Leave the Pieces" (2006)
- Taylor Hicks – "Do I Make You Proud" (2006)
- Paris Hilton – "Stars Are Blind" (2006)
- Gnarls Barkley – "Crazy" (2006)
- Cassie – "Me & U" (2006)
- Young Dro – "Shoulder Lean" (2006)
- Brooke Hogan – "About Us" (2006)
- Cherish ft. Sean P – "Do It to It" (2006)
- The Pack – "Vans" (2006)
- Corinne Bailey Rae – "Put Your Records On" (2006)
- Peter Bjorn and John – "Young Folks" (2006)
- Hinder – "Lips of an Angel" (2006)
- Snow Patrol – "Chasing Cars" (2006)
- Jibbs – "Chain Hang Low" (2006)
- DJ Webstar and Young B. – "Chicken Noodle Soup" (2006)
- Heartland – "I Loved Her First" (2006)
- Mario Vazquez – "Gallery" (2006)
- Corbin Bleu – "Push It to the Limit" (2007)
- Hellogoodbye – "Here (In Your Arms)" (2007)
- Augustana – "Boston" (2007)
- Mims – "This Is Why I'm Hot" (2007)
- Rich Boy – "Throw Some D's" (2007)
- Baby Boy da Prince – "The Way I Live" (2007)
- The Red Jumpsuit Apparatus – "Face Down" (2007)
- Huey – "Pop, Lock & Drop It" (2007)
- Shop Boyz – "Party Like a Rockstar" (2007)
- Amy Winehouse – "Rehab" (2007)
- Down AKA Kilo – "Lean like a Cholo" (2007)
- Plain White T's – "Hey There Delilah" (2007)
- Hurricane Chris – "A Bay Bay" (2007)
- Aly & AJ – "Potential Breakup Song" (2007)
- Cupid – "Cupid Shuffle" (2007)
- Elliott Yamin – "Wait For You" (2007)
- Kat DeLuna – "Whine Up" (2007)
- J. Holiday – "Bed" (2007)
- Feist – "1234" (2007)
- Playaz Circle – "Duffle Bag Boy" (2007)
- Niia – "Sweetest Girl (Dollar Bill)" (2008)
- Yael Naim – "New Soul" (2008)
- Buckcherry – "Sorry" (2008)
- 2 Pistols – "She Got It" (2008)
- James Otto – "Just Got Started Lovin' You" (2008)
- Colby O'Donis – "What You Got" (2008)
- Duffy – "Mercy" (2008)
- Metro Station – "Shake It" (2008)
- V.I.C. – "Get Silly" (2008)
- Flobots – "Handlebars" (2008)
- Shwayze – "Corona and Lime" (2008)
- Hit Masters – "All Summer Long" (2008)
- Estelle – "American Boy" (2008)
- The Rock Heroes – "All Summer Long" (2008)
- Saving Abel – "Addicted" (2008)
- The Veronicas – "Untouched" (2009)
- A. R. Rahman – "Jai Ho! (You Are My Destiny)" (2009)
- GS Boyz – "Stanky Legg" (2009)
- Asher Roth – "I Love College" (2009)
- Kristinia DeBarge – "Goodbye" (2009)
- The Ting Tings – "That's Not My Name" (2009)
- Dorrough – "Ice Cream Paint Job" (2009)
- Muse – "Uprising" (2009)
- Michael Franti & Spearhead – "Say Hey (I Love You)" (2009)
- Ester Dean – "Drop It Low" (2009)

== 2010s ==
- Iyaz – "Replay" (2010)
- Orianthi – "According To You" (2010)
- Spose – "I'm Awesome" (2010)
- Travie McCoy – "Billionaire" (2010)
- La Roux – "Bulletproof" (2010)
- Freshlyground – "Waka Waka (This Time for Africa)" (2010)
- Jaron and the Long Road to Love – "Pray for You" (2010)
- Cali Swag District – "Teach Me How to Dougie" (2010)
- The Cataracs – "Like a G6" (2010)
- The Ready Set – "Love Like Woe" (2010)
- Yolanda Be Cool and DCUP – "We No Speak Americano" (2010)
- Willow – "Whip My Hair" (2010)
- Edward Maya and Vika Jigulina – "Stereo Love" (2011)
- Tinie Tempah ft. Eric Turner – "Written in the Stars" (2011)
- Duck Sauce – "Barbra Streisand" (2011)
- YC – "Racks" (2011)
- Hot Chelle Rae – "Tonight Tonight" (2011)
- Foster the People – "Pumped Up Kicks" (2011)
- Kreayshawn – "Gucci Gucci" (2011)
- Dev – "In the Dark" (2011)
- Alexandra Stan – "Mr. Saxobeat" (2011)
- The Wanted – "Glad You Came" (2012)
- Gotye ft. Kimbra – "Somebody That I Used to Know" (2012)
- Outasight – "Tonight is the Night" (2012)
- Kirko Bangz – "Drank in My Cup" (2012)
- Karmin – "Brokenhearted" (2012)
- Grouplove – "Tongue Tied" (2012)
- Ca$h Out – "Cashin' Out" (2012)
- Love and Theft – "Angel Eyes" (2012)
- Gloriana – "(Kissed You) Good Night" (2012)
- Alex Clare – "Too Close" (2012)
- The Lumineers – "Ho Hey" (2012)
- Of Monsters and Men – "Little Talks" (2013)
- Trinidad James – "All Gold Everything" (2013)
- Baauer – "Harlem Shake" (2013)
- Mikky Ekko – "Stay" (2013)
- Icona Pop – "I Love It" (2013)
- Zach Sobiech – "Clouds" (2013)
- The Finatticz – "Don't Drop That Thun Thun" (2013)
- Anna Kendrick – "Cups" (2013)
- Foxes – "Clarity" (2013)
- Capital Cities – "Safe and Sound" (2013)
- Awolnation – "Sail" (2013)
- Ylvis – "The Fox (What Does the Fox Say?)" (2013)
- Alison Gold – "Chinese Food" (2013)
- A Great Big World – "Say Something" (2013)
- The Neighbourhood – "Sweater Weather" (2013)
- Passenger – "Let Her Go" (2014)
- Soko – "We Might Be Dead by Tomorrow" (2014)
- American Authors – "Best Day of My Life" (2014)
- Rixton – "Me and My Broken Heart" (2014)
- Nico & Vinz – "Am I Wrong" (2014)
- MKTO – "Classic" (2014)
- Magic! – "Rude" (2014)
- Kongos – "Come with Me Now" (2014)
- Disclosure – "Latch" (2014)
- OG Maco – "U Guessed It" (2014)
- Bobby Shmurda – "Hot Nigga" (2014)
- ILoveMakonnen – "Tuesday" (2014)
- Mr. Probz – "Waves (Robin Schulz Remix)" (2014)
- Milky Chance – "Stolen Dance" (2015)
- Vance Joy – "Riptide" (2015)
- O.T. Genasis – "CoCo" (2015)
- Lilly Wood and the Prick – "Prayer In C (Robin Schulz Remix)" (2015)
- T-Wayne – "Nasty Freestyle" (2015)
- Walk the Moon – "Shut Up and Dance" (2015)
- George Ezra – "Budapest" (2015)
- Silentó – "Watch Me (Whip/Nae Nae)" (2015)
- OMI – "Cheerleader (Felix Jaehn remix)" (2015)
- Rachel Platten – "Fight Song" (2015)
- Jidenna ft. Roman GianArthur – "Classic Man" (2015)
- R. City – "Locked Away" (2015)
- ILoveMemphis – "Hit the Quan" (2015)
- Elle King – "Ex's & Oh's" (2015)
- Cam – "Burning House" (2016)
- DNCE – "Cake by the Ocean" (2016)
- Lukas Graham – "7 Years" (2016)
- Desiigner – "Panda" (2016)
- MNEK – "Never Forget You" (2016)
- Kent Jones – "Don't Mind" (2016)
- Kiiara – "Gold" (2016)
- Kungs vs. Cookin' on 3 Burners – "This Girl" (2016)
- Gnash featuring Olivia O'Brien – "I Hate U, I Love U" (2016)
- DRAM – "Broccoli" (2016)
- Young M.A – "OOOUUU" (2016)
- Rob Stone ft. J. Davis and Spooks – "Chill Bill" (2016)
- Zay Hilfigerrr & Zayion McCall – "Juju on That Beat" (2017)
- Kyle – "iSpy" (2017)
- Luis Fonsi – "Despacito" (2017)
- Ayo & Teo – "Rolex" (2017)
- Portugal. The Man – "Feel It Still" (2017)
- NF – "Let You Down" (2018)
- BlocBoy JB – "Look Alive" (2018)
- Sheck Wes – "Mo Bamba" (2018)
- Blueface – "Thotiana" (2019)
- Pinkfong – "Baby Shark" (2019)
- Arizona Zervas – "Roxanne" (2019)

== 2020s ==
- Tones and I – "Dance Monkey" (2020)
- 24kGoldn – "Mood" (2020)
- CJ – "Whoopty" (2021)
- Masked Wolf – "Astronaut in the Ocean" (2021)
- Gayle – "ABCDEFU" (2022)
- Glass Animals – "Heat Waves" (2022)
- Oliver Anthony – "Rich Men North of Richmond" (2023)

== See also ==
- One-hit wonder
- Lists of one-hit wonders in different countries
- List of signature songs
