= Like They Say in L.A. =

Single by East L.A. Car Pool
- B-side: "Linda Chicana"
- Released: July 1975 (U.S.)
- Genre: Disco, pop, soft rock
- Label: General Recording Corporation (GRC)
- Songwriter: Jerry Rusch
- Producer: Jack Gold

"Like They Say in L.A." is a song recorded by East L.A. Car Pool in 1975. The song was issued as a non-album single.

It became the group's only hit during the summer of the year, reaching #72 in the United States. The song was a much bigger Easy Listening hit, reaching #10. On the Canadian Adult Contemporary chart, the song reached #28.

The song was subsequently re-recorded by the group, and that version of "Like They Say in L.A." has been published to YouTube.

== Chart history ==
Chart (1975)	Peak position
Canada RPM Adult Contemporary	28
U.S. Billboard Hot 100	72
U.S. Billboard Easy Listening	10
U.S. Cash Box Top 100	84

== See also ==
- List of one-hit wonders in the United States
