= Neil Sedaka: Italiano =

Italiano

Compilation album by Neil Sedaka
- Released: 1964
- Genre: Pop
- Label: RCA Victor

Neil Sedaka chronology
| Three Great Guys (with Paul Anka and Sam Cooke (1963) | Italiano (1964) | Neil Sedaka: Italiano Volume 2 (1965) |

Neil Sedaka Italiano is a 1964 compilation album containing twelve of Neil Sedaka's Italian-language recordings. It was released in Italy by RCA Victor's Italiana studios. Of the twelve songs on the album, six were recorded by Sedaka in English. A seventh song on the album, "A 16 Anni Tu Vuoi Amare", is an Italian-language version of Andrea Carroll's 1963 hit, "It Hurts To Be Sixteen".

== Track listing ==
N.B. Where songs have English-language equivalents, they are noted in italics.

Lato 1 (Side 1)

1. "I Tuoi Capricci" ("Look Inside Your Heart")
2. "Quando Sorridi Cosi"
3. "La Terza Luna" ("Waiting For Never")
4. "Adesso No"
5. "Finche Vivrò" ("As Long As I Live")
6. "Il Cielo Ti Ha Creata Per Me"

Lato 2 (Side 2)

1. ""Tu Non Lo Sai" ("Breaking Up Is Hard To Do")
2. "Non Cercare Un'Altra Bocca" ("Walk With Me")
3. "Il Re Dei Pagliacci" ("King of Clowns")
4. "L'Ultimo Appuntamento"
5. "A 16 Anni Tu Vuoi Amare" ("It Hurts To Be Sixteen")
6. "Se C'è Un Paradiso"

== Singles releases ==
Eight of the songs on this album saw 45 rpm singles releases prior to being compiled together for this album.

- 1962: "Tu Non Lo Sai" b/w "Finche Vivro"
- 1963: "La Terza Luna" b/w "Il Re Dei Pagliacci"
- 1963: "I Tuoi Capricci" b/w "Non Cercare Un'Altra Bocca"
- 1963: "Adesso No" b/w "Quando Sorridi Cosi"

== CD re-issue ==
In 1993, Casa Nostra Records reissued this album, along with the tracks from "Neil Sedaka: Italiano Volume 2", as a combo album.
