= Anything You Want =

"Anything You Want" may refer to:

- Anything You Want (film), a 2010 Spanish family drama film
- "(Make Me Do) Anything You Want", a 1972 single by A Foot in Coldwater
- Anything You Want, a 1976 song and album by John Valenti
- "Anything You Want", a 1981 song by the Lambrettas
- "Anything You Want", a song by Whitesnake from the 1997 album Restless Heart (Whitesnake album)
- "Anything You Want", a song by Spoon from the 2001 album Girls Can Tell
- "Anything You Want", a song by April Wine from the 2002 album I Like to Rock
- "Anything You Want", a 2022 song by Reality Club
- "You Got It", a 1989 song by Roy Orbison
