= List of number-one hits of 1963 (Argentina) =

This is a list of the songs that reached number one in Argentina in 1963, according to Billboard magazine with data provided by Rubén Machado's "Escalera a la fama".

Issue date	Song	Artist(s)
January 5	"Speedy Gonzales"	Pat Boone/David Dante/ Peppino di Capri
January 19	"Speedy Gonzales"	Pat Boone/David Dante/ Peppino di Capri
January 26	"Speedy Gonzales"	Pat Boone/David Dante/ Peppino di Capri
February 2	"Speedy Gonzales"	Pat Boone/David Dante/ Peppino di Capri
February 9	"Dame felicidad"	Enrique Guzmán/Siro San Román
February 23	"Dame felicidad"	Enrique Guzmán/Siro San Román
March 2	"Limbo Rock"	Chubby Checker/Jackie y Los Ciclones
March 23	"Limbo Rock"	Chubby Checker/Jackie y Los Ciclones
March 30	"Limbo Rock"	Chubby Checker/Jackie y Los Ciclones
April 6	"Limbo Rock"	Chubby Checker/Jackie y Los Ciclones
April 13	"Limbo Rock"	Chubby Checker/Jackie y Los Ciclones
April 20	"Limbo Rock"	Chubby Checker/Jackie y Los Ciclones
May 4	"Adiós, mundo cruel" ("Goodbye Cruel World")	Enrique Guzmán/Aki Aleong and his Licorice Twisters/ Peppino di Capri
May 11	"Adiós, mundo cruel" ("Goodbye Cruel World")	Enrique Guzmán/Aki Aleong and his Licorice Twisters/ Peppino di Capri
May 18	"Adiós, mundo cruel" ("Goodbye Cruel World")	Enrique Guzmán/Aki Aleong and his Licorice Twisters/ Peppino di Capri
June 1	"Adiós, mundo cruel" ("Goodbye Cruel World")	Enrique Guzmán/Aki Aleong and his Licorice Twisters/ Peppino di Capri
June 8	"Cutie Pie"	Johnny Tillotson
June 15	"Puente Pexoa"	Los Trovadores del Norte
June 22	"Puente Pexoa"	Los Trovadores del Norte
July 13	"Puente Pexoa"	Los Trovadores del Norte
July 20	"Puente Pexoa"	Los Trovadores del Norte
July 27	"Puente Pexoa"	Los Trovadores del Norte
August 3	"Mira cómo me balanceo"	Edoardo Vianello
August 17	"Mira cómo me balanceo"	Edoardo Vianello
August 24	"Mira cómo me balanceo"	Edoardo Vianello
August 31	"Mira cómo me balanceo"	Edoardo Vianello
September 7	"Río manso"	Ramona Galarza
September 14	"La terza luna"	Neil Sedaka
September 21	"Those Lazy-Hazy-Crazy Days of Summer"	Nat King Cole
September 28	"La terza luna"	Neil Sedaka
October 12	"La terza luna"	Neil Sedaka
October 19	"Il ballo del mattone"	Rita Pavone
October 26	"Il ballo del mattone"	Rita Pavone
November 2	"Il ballo del mattone"	Rita Pavone
November 9	"Il ballo del mattone"	Rita Pavone
November 16	"Il ballo del mattone"	Rita Pavone
December 14	"Cuore"	Rita Pavone
December 21	"Those Lazy-Hazy-Crazy Days of Summer"	Nat King Cole

== See also ==
- 1963 in music
