= Don't Hold Back =

Don't Hold Back may refer to:

- Don't Hold Back, a 2001 album by Public Announcement
- Don't Hold Back, a 1970 album by Sky
- "Don't Hold Back" (The Potbelleez song), 2007
- "Don't Hold Back", a song by The Alan Parsons Parsons Project from Eve
- "Don't Hold Back", a song by The Sleeping from Questions & Answers
- "Don't Hold Back", a song by Chanson
