= If You Should Sail =

1980 single by Nielsen Pearson

Single by Nielsen Pearson

from the album Nielsen Pearson
- B-side: "Don't Forget"
- Released: 1980
- Length: 3:28
- Label: Capitol
- Songwriter(s): Mark Pearson, Reed Nielsen
- Producer(s): Richard Landis

Nielsen Pearson singles chronology
| "Two Lonely Nights" (1980) | "If You Should Sail" (1980) | "Givin' Your Love to Me" (1980) |

"If You Should Sail" is a song by American duo Nielsen Pearson. It was released as a single in 1980 from their self-titled album.

The song peaked at No. 38 on the Billboard Hot 100 and No. 35 on the Adult Contemporary chart, becoming the duo's only top 40 hit.

== Chart performance ==
| Chart (1980) | Peak position |
|---|---|
| U.S. Billboard Hot 100 | 38 |
| U.S. Billboard Adult Contemporary | 35 |

== See also ==
- List of one-hit wonders in the United States
