= Neil Sedaka: Italiano Volume 2 =

Sedaka Italiano Volume 2 is a 1965 compilation containing a second set of Italian-language recordings by the American pop star Neil Sedaka. It was released on RCA Victor's Italiana label in Italy.

== Track listing ==
=== Side 1 ===
- 1) "La Notte E' Fatta Per Amare" ("Another Day, Another Heartache")
- 2) "Sara' Sara'"
- 3) "Viene La Notte"
- 4) "Mai Sara' Come Te" ("She'll Never Be You")
- 5) "Ricordati Ancora"
- 6) "Matto" ("The Dreamer")

=== Side 2 ===
- 7) "Non Basta Mai"
- 8) "I Primi Giorni" ("Bad Girl")
- 9) "La Luna A Fiori"
- 10) "Darei 10 Anni"
- 11) "La Forza Del Destino"
- 12) "Che Non Farei" ("I Hope He Breaks Your Heart")

== CD re-issue ==
In 1993, Casa Nostra Records reissued this album, along with the tracks from "Neil Sedaka: Italiano", as a combo album.
