= Redeye (band) =

Redeye was an American rock band from Los Angeles, California, United States. The group released two albums on Pentagram Records in the early 1970s, and had two hit singles in 1971, "Games" (U.S. Billboard Hot 100 chart number 27) and "Redeye Blues" (U.S. number 78).

== Members ==
- Douglas "Red" Mark - vocals, guitar (previously of The Sunshine Company)
- Dave Hodgkins - guitar, vocals
- Bill Kirkham - bass guitar, vocals
- Bob Bereman - drums and percussion

Post 1985: Brett Martin - bass/vocals Steve Strain - saxophone/keys/vocals Ron McCann - lead guitar/vocals

== Album discography ==
- Redeye (Pentagram, 1970) U.S. Billboard Hot 200 peak number 113
- One Man's Poison (Pentagram, 1972)
- Back To The Wall (Wrinkle, 1987)

== See also ==
- List of 1970s one-hit wonders in the United States
