= The Classics =

American vocal group

The Classics were an American vocal group formed in 1958 in Brooklyn.

The Classics first sang together in high school; two of them had previously sung in a group called The Del-Rays. In 1959, under the auspices of manager Jim Gribble, they recorded their first single, "Cinderella"; the record Bubbled Under the US Hot 100 in early 1960. The follow-up, "Angel Angela", also narrowly missed the national charts, and the 1961 single "Life Is But a Dream" hit the lower regions of the R&B Singles chart when Mercury Records picked it up for national distribution, but it wasn't until they released the single "Blue Moon" with Herb Lance on lead vocals that they charted a hit. The song peaked at #50.

The group signed with Musicnote Records in 1963 and released "Till Then", which became their biggest hit, peaking at #20 on the pop charts and #7 AC.

The group was best remembered for its ballads, and frequently sang versions of pop standards from the 1920s and 1930s. They frequently changed labels over the course of their career, and parted ways about 1966. Member Emil Stucchio revived the name to tour in the 1970s and again in the 1990s and 2000s. In the 1990s, the group was Stuccio, former Mystic Al Contrera, Scott LaChance, and Michael Paquette. Later it was Stuccio, Contrera, LaChance, and Teresa McClean. LaChance later left the group.

== Members ==
- Emil Stucchio
- Tony Victor
- Johnny Gambale
- Jamie Troy

== Discography ==
=== Singles ===
Year	Title	Peak chart positions			Record Label	B-side
Year	Title	US Pop	US AC	US R&B	Record Label	B-side
1960	"Cinderella"	109	—	—	Dart	"So in Love"
1961	"Life Is but a Dream, Sweetheart"	109	—	27	Mercury	"That's the Way It Goes"
1963	"Till Then"	20	7	—	Musicnote	"Enie Minie Mo"
1963	"P.S. I Love You"	120	—	—	Musicnote	"Wrap Your Troubles in Dreams"
1964	"You'll Never Know"	—	—	—	Stork	"Dancing With You"
1965	"Over the Weekend"	—	—	—	Josie	"Dancing With You"
