= La terza luna =

1962 song

"La terza luna" is an Italian popular song recorded by the American pop singer Neil Sedaka, written and arranged by Luis Enriquez Bacalov with the text by Franco Migliacci. It was released in November 1962 in Italy by RCA Victor Records.

It was enormously popular, reaching #1 on the Italian pop charts for one week in April 1963. It was included as the third song of Sedaka's 1964 Italiano compilation album. A Cinebox film of Sedaka performing "La terza luna" was also produced.

For his Anglophone fans in America, England, Australia and elsewhere, Sedaka recorded an English-language version, "Waiting For Never", released as the B-side of "Let's Go Steady Again" in 1963. He also recorded a Spanish-language version, "Ire Por Ti".

The B-side of "La terza luna" was "Il re dei pagliacci", an Italian-language version of Sedaka's 1962 hit, "King of Clowns".

== Charts ==
Chart (1962–63)	Peak position
Argentina (CAPIF)	1
Italy (Musica e dischi)	2
Peru (La Prensa)	1
