= Nielsen Pearson =

American rock duo

- Origin: Sacramento, California, U.S.
- Genres: Country rock; soft rock
- Years active: 1969–1983
- Labels: Epic; Capitol
- Past members: Reed Nielsen; Mark Pearson
- Website: www.myspace.com/nielsenpearson

Nielsen Pearson was an American duo consisting of Reed Nielsen and Mark Pearson. They are a one-hit wonder known for their only Top 40 single, "If You Should Sail".

== Discography ==
=== Albums ===
- The Nielsen Pearson Band (Epic, 1978)
- Nielsen/Pearson (Capitol, 1980)
- Blind Luck (Capitol, 1983)

=== Singles ===
Year	Title	Peak chart positions		Album
Year	Title	US	US AC	Album
1978	"Home"	—	—	The Nielsen Pearson Band
1980	"Two Lonely Nights"	110	—	Nielsen/Pearson
1980	"If You Should Sail"	38	35	Nielsen/Pearson
1981	"Givin' Your Love to Me"	—	—	Nielsen/Pearson
1981	"The Sun Ain't Gonna Shine (Anymore)"	56	31	Blind Luck
1983	"Hasty Heart"	—	—	Blind Luck
"—" denotes a recording that did not chart or was not released in that territory.
