= 1900 Yesterday =

Single by Liz Damon's Orient Express

from the album Liz Damon's Orient Express
- B-side: "You're Falling In Love"
- Released: 1970
- Genre: Easy listening
- Length: 2:35
- Label: Makaha
- Songwriters: John Cameron & Lee Simmons
- Producer: George J.D. Chun

"1900 Yesterday" is a song written by John Cameron and Lee Simmons. The song was originally released by Betty Everett in 1969 on the album There'll Come a Time.

== Liz Damon's Orient Express version ==
"1900 Yesterday" was a hit single in 1970 and 1971 for the Liz Damon's Orient Express. Liz Damon's version was originally released as a single on the Hawaii based Makaha label, before White Whale acquired the worldwide distribution rights in December 1970. In 1971, the song was released on the album Liz Damon's Orient Express.

The song spent 12 weeks on the Billboard Hot 100 chart, peaking at No. 33 the week of February 13, 1971, while reaching No. 4 on Billboard's Easy Listening chart, No. 29 on the Cash Box Top 100, No. 15 on Canada's RPM 100, and No. 16 on RPM's "MOR Playlist".

The song was ranked No. 21 on Billboard's year-end ranking of 1971's "Top Easy Listening Singles".

=== Chart performance ===
| Chart (1971) | Peak position |
|---|---|
| US Billboard Hot 100 | 33 |
| US Billboard Easy Listening | 4 |
| US Cash Box Top 100 | 29 |
| US Record World The Singles Chart | 31 |
| US Record World Top Non-Rock | 5 |
| Canada – RPM 100 | 15 |
| Canada – RPM MOR Playlist | 16 |

== Trivia ==
The lines that precede the song's title -- "Like smoke from a cigarette/Dreams that you soon forget"—appear in the 1966 song "Fading Away," written by Smokey Robinson, Warren "Pete" Moore, and Bobby Rogers of the Motown act The Miracles, and first recorded by The Temptations for their 1966 album Gettin' Ready.

The single and the album were the last records released by White Whale Records.
