= The Revels (doo-wop group) =

Musical group from Philadelphia

Background information
- Also known as: The Re-Vels Quartette, The Re-Vels
- Origin: Philadelphia, Pennsylvania, United States
- Genres: Doo-wop
- Years active: 1954–1964
- Labels: Atlas; Sound; Chess; Norgolde; Kapp
- Past members: John Kelly; John Grant; John Jones; Henry Colclugh; Bill Jackson

The Revels (also known as The Re-Vels and The Re-Vels Quartette) were an American doo-wop group formed in Philadelphia, Pennsylvania, in 1954. At first, the group bounced around different record labels earnings regional hits with tunes such as "Cha-Cha Toni" and "False Alarm", but national success initially eluded them. In 1959, however, the Revels charted at number 35 on the Billboard Hot 100 with "Midnight Stroll"—the act's only Top 40 hit.

== History ==
In 1954, West Philadelphia High School students John Kelly (lead vocalist), John Grant, John Jones, Henry Colclugh and Bill Jackson formed the vocal group, originally performing under the moniker the Re-Vels Quartette. Their live appearances made the combo a well-attended attraction in Northern Philadelphia, which enticed Atlas Records in 1955 and Sound Records in the following year to record singles with the group. Credited to the shortened name the Re-Vels, the singles released in the two years included "So in Love", "You Lied to Me", and "Cha-Cha Toni", the latter of which was a big regional hit in Philadelphia and some other eastern cities but never charted nationally. In 1958, the Re-Vels signed with Chess Records and released "False Alarm", perhaps their most accomplished record thus far. However, success still eluded the group, prompting Chess Records, which was still in the midst of a prosperous string of releases from Chuck Berry and the Moonglows, to cut the Re-Vels from their roster.

A small record label established by Harold Nussbaum (also known as Hal Norton) and William Goldstein called Norgolde Records signed the group, now without a hyphen in their moniker. Jackson's self-penned novelty song "Dead Man's Stroll", paired with "Talking to My Heart", was selected to be recorded and distributed for the Halloween market in 1959. Author Richard Aquilla described the single as a teen favorite with "a spooky sound, replete with midnight tolls and wailing ghosts". Released in September 1959, "Dead Man's Stroll" was played across the United States, leading to an appearance on Dick Clark's American Bandstand at the end of the month. Clark, however, objected to the song's title, forcing the Revels to alter it to "Midnight Stroll" to avoid losing the much-needed television exposure. The song peaked at number 35 on the Billboard Hot 100 in early November and remained on the charts until December 1959.

The Revels followed-up "Midnight Stroll" with "Foo Man Choo" in 1960, which also attempted to inflict more chills on its listeners. However, the release could not reach the height of popularity as its predecessor and failed to chart. The group released other singles in the 1960s before disbanding in 1964. Jackson, having composed the majority of the Revels' original material, continued in the music industry as a songwriter. He joined Cameo-Parkway Records in 1963 and had a hand in penning the Tymes' hit song "So Much in Love". In addition, Jackson co-wrote "Here She Comes", "The Magic of Our Summer Love", and "You Little Trustmaker", and produced the group's recordings in 1963 and 1964. In the 1990s, the Revels reformed for doo-wop revival festivals and television programs in Pennsylvania.
