= Diane Ray =

American pop and rock and roll singer (1945–2020)

Diane Peoples Waldrop (née Ray; September 1, 1945 – March 14, 2020) was an American pop and rock and roll singer of the early 1960s. Ray was born in Gastonia, North Carolina. Her musical career began after she won a talent contest on Big WAYS radio in Charlotte NC. She is best known for her hit single, "Please Don't Talk to the Lifeguard", which reached #31 on the Billboard Hot 100 chart in 1963. Without any further chart presence, Ray remains a one-hit wonder.

Diane Ray Waldrop died on March 14, 2020, at the age of 74.

== Discography ==
=== Album ===
Title	Album details	Charts	
Title	Album details	US Billboard	US Cashbox
The Exciting Years	Released: April 1964; Label: Mercury (MG 20903 / SR 60903)	—	—

=== Singles ===
Year	Title	Label and catalogue number	Peak chart position		Album
Year	Title	Label and catalogue number	US Billboard	Us Cashbox	Album
1963	"Please Don't Talk to the Lifeguard" b/w "That's I Want From You"	Mercury (72117)	31	33	The Exciting Years
1963	"Where is the Boy?" b/w "My Summer Love (Is Heading for an Early Fall)"	Mercury (72195)	—	—	The Exciting Years
1963	"Snow Man" b/w "Just So Bobby Can See"	Mercury (72223)	—	—	The Exciting Years
1964	"Tied up with Mary" b/w "No Arms Can Ever Hold You"	Mercury (72248)	—	—	The Exciting Years
1964	"That Boy's Gonna Be Mine" b/w "Happy, Happy Birthday Baby"	Mercury (72276)	—	—	The Exciting Years
