= Hawaii Tattoo =

Single by The Waikikis

from the album Hawaii Tattoo
- B-side: "Tahiti Tamoire"
- Released: 1964
- Recorded: 1964
- Genre: Surf rock
- Length: 2:23
- Label: Kapp
- Composer: Michael Thomas

The Waikikis singles chronology
| "Tiki Tiki Puka" (1963) | "Hawaii Tattoo" (1964) | "Hawaiian Honeymoon" (1965) |

"Hawaii Tattoo" is an instrumental by The Waikikis, released in the US in 1964, on Kapp Records.

"Hawaii Tattoo" was recorded in Belgium in 1961 and spent two months in the Belgian charts. It was also a huge hit in Germany, spending 37 weeks in the Top Ten and also reached the Top Fifty in the US, Canada(No.2CHUM/No.23RPM), and the UK (No.41).

As a result of its chart hit status, "Hawaii Tattoo" joined the ranks of such songs as "Sweet Leilani", "Hawaiian Wedding Song", "Tiny Bubbles", and others as sort of a "Hawaiian" standard song and was recorded by many artists such as Martin Denny, The Kilima Hawaiians, Webley Edwards Hawaii Calls Orchestra, and nearly every act recording a "Hawaiian" LP in the 1960s. However, it seems to be better known outside of Hawaii, where it is seldom heard.

== History ==
The piece originated by initiative of record producer Horst Fuchs, who had contact to a Belgian group of studio musicians, calling themselves "The Waikikis" and for whom Fuchs looked for compositions with a certain "Hawaiian flair". He contacted the composers Hans Blum and Martin Böttcher for some music pieces. Martin Böttcher did not respond at first, but after some personal words he delivered a composition within half an hour. Being known in Germany for a completely different music style Böttcher decided to take his pseudonym "Michael Thomas" for this composition.

In 1961 the first four tracks for a record by the Waikikis were produced, among them "Hawaii Tattoo", that soon gained international fame. In Germany some 600.000 copies were sold and internationally about 2.5 million, Horst Fuchs remembered. In December 1961 "Hawaii Tattoo" entered the top 50 of the German music charts, being listed for 37 weeks with a top rank on place 4. Three years later the song also was listed in the American Billboard charts.

The arrangement of the published track was probably by the leader, arranger and piano player of "The Waikikis", Willy Albimoor. Martin Böttcher himself recorded a version under the title Hawaii Tattoo Dixie with a formation he called Mike Thomas and his Wall Street Babies. In 1962 he included the famous version by the Waikikis in his soundtrack of the Heinz Rühmann movie Max the Pickpocket, where it could be heard coming from a jukebox.
