= Andrea Carroll =

American singer (born 1946)

- Born: Andrea Lee DeCapite; October 3, 1946 (age 79); Cleveland, Ohio
- Occupations: Singer, actress
- Labels: Various including Epic Records, Bigtop Records, RCA Records, United Artists Records

Andrea Lee DeCapite (born October 3, 1946), known by her stage name Andrea Carroll, is an American former pop singer and actress, who had a Billboard top 50 hit in 1963 with "It Hurts To Be Sixteen", and has subsequently worked as a therapist and acting coach. Now, after her marriage, she is known as Andrea Hill, PhD

== Life ==
She was born in Cleveland, Ohio, and at the age of three began appearing on television as a singer in The Gene Carroll Show, a talent show hosted by Carroll (1897–1972) that was broadcast in the Ohio area. She took the stage name Carroll and continued to appear regularly on the show through the 1950s. She made her first recordings as a pop singer on the Epic label with "Young and Lonely" in 1961, followed by "Please Don't Talk to the Lifeguard", which became a major hit in the Cleveland area but failed to break into the national charts. After further singles on Epic failed to become hits, she signed with Bright Tunes Productions in New York City, and recorded "It Hurts To Be Sixteen" – her real age at the time – released on the Big Top label. "It Hurts to Be Sixteen" was written as an answer song to Neil Sedaka's hit "Happy Birthday Sweet Sixteen," with a melody by Sedaka and lyrics by Ronnie Grossman, a chemist who was married to Sedaka's sister. Carroll's recording featured the Chiffons on uncredited backing vocals, and rose to number 45 on the US pop chart in 1963. However, the follow-up record, "The Doolang", written by Howard Greenfield and Helen Miller, also featuring the Chiffons, failed to chart. Carroll released several more singles on the RCA and United Artists labels, including "Hey Beach Boy", but they were unsuccessful. She continued to appear on The Gene Carroll Show through to the mid-1960s, and also toured with her own band, before giving up her musical career.

She attended Kent State University in the late 1960s, and made her final appearance on The Gene Carroll Show on a special tribute edition following Carroll's death. She later married television producer Lyle B. Hill, and trained as a clinical therapist. The couple own the Weist-Barron-Hill acting school in Burbank, California. Andrea Hill has published Making It in the Business, a book of guidance for people seeking to enter the entertainment industry.

== Discography ==
Year	Title	Label	Catalogue number	Peak chart positions	
Year	Title	Label	Catalogue number	US Billboard	US Cashbox
1961	"I've Got a Date with Frankie" b/w "Young and Lonely"	Epic	5-9438	—	—
1961	"Please Don't Talk to the Lifeguard" b/w "Room of Memories"	Epic	5-9450	—	123
1961	"Gee Dad" b/w "The Charm on My Arm"	Epic	5-9471	—	—
1962	"Fifteen Shades of Pink" b/w "Miss Happiness"	Epic	5-9523	—	—
1963	"It Hurts to Be Sixteen" b/w "Why Am I So Why?"	Bigtop	45-3156	45	60
1964	"The Doolang" b/w "This Time Tomorrow"	Bigtop	45-515	—	—
1965	"Sally Fool" b/w "Mr. Music Man"	RCA Victor	47-8618	—	—
1966	"The World Isn't Big Enough" b/w "She Gets Everything She Wants	United Artists	UA 982	—	—
1966	"Hey, Beach Boy" b/w "Why Should We Take The Easy Way Out"	United Artists	UA 50039	—	—

== Filmography ==
TV SHOWS 1. The Gene Carroll show (1897–1972).-Herself
