= The Road Apples =

American pop rock band

The Road Apples were an American pop rock group from Boston, Massachusetts. The group charted two singles on the Billboard Hot 100 in the mid-1970s.

The Road Apples' lead singer/guitarist was David "Finn" Finnerty. The other band members were Flip Morse (lead guitar and vocals), Bard Richmond (bass guitar and vocals), Jean-Do Sifantus (drums), and Chuck Eisenhardt (the original keyboard player, later replaced by Wally Baier). Their first single "Let's Live Together" rose to No. 35 on that chart. A follow-up release "Holding On" b/w "Good Lovin' Woman" bubbled under the Hot 100 at #110. The Road Apples participated in the 'Partners of the Americas' program in 1976 and travelled to Colombia, in South America where they performed numerous free concerts for the people of Medellín and Cartagena.

The Road Apples lead singer and principal songwriter Finn Finnerty later formed The Joneses and released a CD (Atlantic 1990) including a rock cover of "Let's Live Together".

The instrumental Version of their Song "Let's Live Together", was used as background music in a German radio chart show, called "WDR Schlagerrallye".
