= Please Don't Talk to the Lifeguard =

Single by Diane Ray

from the album The Exciting Years
- B-side: "That's All I Want From You"
- Released: 1963
- Recorded: 1963
- Genre: Pop rock
- Length: 1:42
- Label: Mercury – R 72117
- Songwriter(s): Sylvia Dee, George Goehring

Diane Ray singles chronology
"Please Don't Talk to the Lifeguard" (1963)	"Where Is the Boy?" (1963)

"Please Don't Talk to the Lifeguard" is a song by American pop singer Diane Ray. It was featured on her 1964 album The Exciting Years, and reached number 31 on the Billboard Hot 100.

== Original version ==
Originally released as a single by Andrea Carroll on Epic Records in 1961, Andrea's version lacked the success that Diane's rendition eventually would.

== Chart performance ==
The song debuted on the Hot 100 chart dated August 3, 1963. It peaked seven weeks later at number 31. "Please Don't Talk to the Lifeguard" spent a total of 9 weeks on the chart. Ray's next single, "My Summer Love", failed to impact any chart, as did her subsequent singles, making her a one-hit wonder.

== Inclusion on compilations ==
The song has been included on numerous girl-pop compilations, including Growin' Up Too Fast: The Girl Group Anthology (1996), I Wish I Were a Princess: The Great Lost Female Teen Idols (1997), and Early Girls, Vol. 3 (2000).
