= Till Then =

1944 song

"Till Then" is a popular song written by Eddie Seiler, Sol Marcus, and Guy Wood and published in 1944.

== Background ==
The song was a plea (presumably by a soldier, off to fight the war) to his sweetheart to wait for him until he could get back home. Like many war-themed songs, it enjoyed great popularity when it came out in 1944.

== 1944 recordings ==
- Two versions by The Mills Brothers and the Les Brown orchestra, respectively, dominated the charts. The recording by The Mills Brothers was released by Decca Records as catalog number 18599. It first reached the Billboard magazine Best Seller chart on September 21, 1944, and lasted three weeks on the chart, peaking at No. 8 (a two-sided hit, backed by "You Always Hurt the One You Love"). It also topped the R&B charts.

"Till Then"

Single by The Classics
- B-side: "Enie Minie Mo"
- Released: June 1963
- Recorded: 1963
- Genre: Doo-wop
- Length: 2:15
- Label: Musicnote
- Songwriter(s): Eddie Seiler, Sol Marcus, Guy Wood

== Recorded versions ==
The song has continued to be popular, with versions recorded in later years by artists such as:

- Laurindo Almeida
- James Brown (1964)
- Les Brown and His Orchestra (1944)
- The Classics' 1963 version reached No. 20 on the Hot 100 chart and No. 7 on the Middle-Road Singles chart.
- Sammy Davis Jr. (1960)
- Sonny Til & The Orioles (1954)
- Al Martino
- A recording by The Hilltoppers was released in 1954 by Dot Records as catalog number 15132. It first reached the Billboard Best Seller chart on January 23, 1954, and spent eleven weeks on the chart, peaking at No. 10.
- Ray Peterson (1960)

== Popular culture ==
- The Mills Brothers' version of the song was featured on an episode of the TV show The Others entitled "Till Then" (April 29, 2000, Season 1 – Episode 10).
- The Mills Brothers' recording of the song can be heard in Millennium episode "Matryoshka", which starred Lance Henriksen and first aired on 19 February 1999.
- The Mills Brothers' version of the song can be heard in Don't Look Up.
