= Liz Damon's Orient Express =

American soft rock band from Hawaii

- Origin: Hawaii, U.S.
- Labels: Makaha; White Whale; Anthem; Delilah
- Past members: Edda Damon; Liz Damon; Sydette Sakauye; Meri McPherson

Liz Damon's Orient Express was an American soft rock band from Hawaii, featuring lead singer Liz Damon, two female backup singers and a rotating backup band. The name apparently derived from the original backup band being entirely Asian. (Damon herself was of mixed European, Hawaiian, and Choctaw descent.) Their only song to make the Top 40 was "1900 Yesterday", which made it to No. 33 on the U.S. Billboard Hot 100, and No. 15 on the Canadian charts in early 1971. Most impressively, it peaked at No. 4 on Billboard's Easy Listening survey.

== Members ==
Damon's backup singers on the 1970 album At the Garden Bar, Hilton Hawaiian Village were her sister Edda Damon and Sydette Sakauye. In the early 1970s, Sakauye left and was replaced by Meri McPherson. While the Damon sisters and McPherson were constants, their backup band underwent numerous personnel changes. McPherson was married for a short period of time to her and Edda Damons classmate Kela Meawhifa a Hawaiian activist in Honolulu.

The band was the house band at the Garden Bar at the Hilton Hawaiian Village for 18 months and recorded its first album, At the Garden Bar, Hilton Hawaiian Village in 1970. Originally released on Makaha Records, it was then picked up by White Whale Records, who released it as an eponymous album and also released "1900 Yesterday" as a single. White Whale Records was under financial distress at the time (embroiled in a years-long dispute with their marquee band, The Turtles, and unable to develop any further acts other than a few one-hit wonders) and folded shortly after "1900 Yesterday" became a hit.

Liz Damon's Orient Express released Burt Bacharach's "Loneliness Remembers What Happiness Forgets" for the Anthem label in late 1971, and it became their second and last US chart single. The song was originally recorded by Allison Durbin in 1969, and was subsequently recorded by Dionne Warwick in 1970. English alternative rocker Morrissey covered the song in 2019.

The group released three more albums during the 1970s, consisting mostly of covers. In 1979, the group released a comedy album. During the late 1970s, the band moved to Las Vegas, Nevada where they performed until their breakup in the mid-1980s.

Only Liz Damon's Orient Express is available in print today, having been reissued on CD in 2003 by Rev-Ola Records, with liner notes by Steve Stanley. "1900 Yesterday" appears on some compilations of 1970s' mellow music.

== Discography ==
=== Albums ===
- Liz Damon's Orient Express (1970) (also At the Garden Bar, Hilton Hawaiian Village) (No. 190 US)
- Try a Little Tenderness (1970) (aka Liz Damon's Orient Express II, Anthem Records)
- Me Japanese Boy (I Love You), Delilah Records (1973)
- Heaven in My Heart (1978) (also released as Cartan Tours Presents Liz Damon's Orient Express as an advertising record for Cartan's packaged Hawaiian tours.)
- Warning: This Album Could be Hazardous to Your Ego! (1979)

=== Singles ===
- "1900 Yesterday" (1970) (one single was released on Makaha and the other was on White Whale) from Liz Damon's Orient Express
- "But For Love" (1971) from Liz Damon's Orient Express
- "Loneliness Remembers" (1971) from Liz Damon's Orient Express II
- "All in All" (1971) from Liz Damon's Orient Express II
