= The Waikikis =

Band

- Origin: Belgium
- Genre: Surf
- Years active: 1960s

The Waikikis were a Belgian studio band, mostly known for their single "Hawaii Tattoo", released in the U.S. in 1964, on Kapp Records. "Hawaii Tattoo" was recorded in 1961 in Belgium and spent two months in the Belgian chart. It was a huge hit in Germany, spending 21 weeks in the Top Ten and also reached the Top Fifty in the U.S., Canada and the UK.

The album Hawaii Tattoo reached the number 93 spot in the Billboard Hot 200 in 1965.

Behind the scenes, record producer Horst Fuchs promoted the band’s career and pulled the strings. Composers such as Jo van Wetter, Willy Albimoor, Hans Blum and Michael Thomas (Martin Böttcher) created songs like "Hawaii Tattoo", "Carnival of Venice", "Mein Hut der hat drei Ecken", "Aloha Parade", "Honolulu Parade" and "Waikiki Welcome". The Waikikis sold their gramophone records by the millions, and some of their own creations like "Hilo Kiss" or "Hula-Hochzeit" ("Hawaii Honeymoon") made their way into the charts in several countries.

In 2004 the song "Hawaiian March" was used and sampled for the ‘Prince Paul's Bubble Party’ track on the SpongeBob SquarePants Movie film soundtrack.

== Discography ==
=== Albums ===
- Christmas In Hawaii - 1964
- Hawaii Tattoo - 1963
- Midnight Luau - 1968
- Moonlight On Diamond Head - 1969
- A Taste Of Hawaii - 1966
- Hawaii Beach Party - 1965
- Greatest Hits From Hawaii - 1969
- Pearly Shells From Hawaii - 1967
- Lollipops And Roses From Hawaii - 1965
- Road To Waikiki - 1964
