= John Valenti =

American singer-songwriter

John Valenti (born John LiVigni) is an American singer-songwriter from Chicago, Illinois.

== Background ==
He began his career as John LiVigni with a cover of Stevie Winwood's "Gimme Some Lovin'," released on Raintree Records in 1971. He then became lead singer and writer for the pop band Puzzle. Puzzle released two albums on Motown Records in 1973 (Puzzle I) and 1974 (Puzzle II). They were one of the rare white groups on Motown, with a sound often reminiscent of the early Chicago Transit Authority. They were a horn pop soul band with John's vocals recalling Stevie Wonder. They owed a lot to Chicago, one of their inspirations.

John eventually went solo. He released one album in 1976, entitled Anything You Want, on Ariola Records. It peaked at No. 51 on the US Black Albums chart on the strength of its title track, which had been released as a single and which peaked at No. 37 on the Billboard Hot 100. The title track fared better on the US Hot Soul Singles chart, where it went to No. 10, also making minor dents on the Adult Contemporary (#49) and Canadian pop charts (#69).

John released a less successful second album, I Won't Change, in 1981.
