= Chanson (band) =

American disco band

Chanson was an American studio-based disco group from the late 1970s led by bassist James Jamerson Jr. (born in Detroit, Michigan, 1957–2016) and guitarist David Williams (born in Newport News, Virginia, 1950–2009). The group took their name from the French word for song. They were a one-hit wonder, reaching No. 21 on the Billboard Hot 100 chart in 1979 with "Don't Hold Back" on the Ariola record label. The track reached No. 33 in the UK Singles Chart in January 1979.

In the early 1970s, Jamerson Jr. became an in-demand session bassist. Over the next three decades, he played on studio albums by Janet Jackson, Smokey Robinson, and Aretha Franklin, among others. Williams himself also became a prolific session musician, performing guitar on albums by The Jacksons, and various members of the Jackson family, along with Madonna, The Pointer Sisters, and other artists.

Williams died of cardiac arrest on March 6, 2009, at age 58.

Jamerson died on March 23, 2016, at age 58. He had suffered for years with ankylosing spondylitis. He was the son of Motown sideman James Jamerson.
