= List of songs written by Roger Cook and Roger Greenaway =

This is a list of songs written by Roger Cook and Roger Greenaway, including those written by Cook or Greenaway solo, or with other writers. The pair also performed, as David and Jonathan.

== Chart hits and other notable songs written by Roger Cook and Roger Greenaway ==
Year	Song	Original artist	^{UK Singles Chart}	^{U.S. Pop}	Other charting versions, and notes
1965	"You've Got Your Troubles"	The Fortunes	2	7	1966: Nancy Wilson, #48 US R&B; 1970: Jack Blanchard & Misty Morgan, #27 US Country
1966	"This Golden Ring"	The Fortunes	15	82	
1966	"Green Grass"	Gary Lewis & the Playboys	-	8	
1966	"Lovers of the World Unite"	David and Jonathan	7	53	
1967	"I Was Kaiser Bill's Batman"	Whistling Jack Smith	5	20	
1967	"Softly Whispering I Love You"	David and Jonathan	-	-	1971: The Congregation, #4 UK, #27 US pop (as the English Congregation); 1990: Paul Young, #21 UK
1967	"I Think I'm Getting Over You"	Scott Walker	-	-	
1967	"Something's Gotten Hold of My Heart"	David and Jonathan	-	-	1967: Gene Pitney, #5 UK; 1989: Marc Almond, #1 UK
1968	"I've Got You On My Mind"	Dorian Gray	36	-	1970: White Plains, #17 UK
1969	"The Way It Used to Be"	Engelbert Humperdinck	3	42	
1969	"Good Times (Better Times)"	Cliff Richard	12	-	Written by Cook, Greenaway, and Jerry Lordan
1969	"A Way of Life"	The Family Dogg	6	-	
1969	"Conversations"	Cilla Black	7	-	Written by Cook, Greenaway, and Jerry Lordan
1969	"Melting Pot"	Blue Mink	3	-	
1969	"Hallelujah"	Deep Purple	-	-	
1970	"My Baby Loves Lovin'"	White Plains	9	13	
1970	"A Street Called Hope"	Gene Pitney	37	-	
1970	"Good Morning Freedom"	Blue Mink	10	-	Written by Cook, Greenaway, Albert Hammond and Mike Hazlewood; 1970: Daybreak, #94 US pop
1970	"Lovin' You Baby"	White Plains	-	82	
1970	"Gasoline Alley Bred"	The Hollies	14	-	Written by Cook, Greenaway, and Tony Macaulay
1970	"Home Lovin' Man"	Andy Williams	7	-	Written by Cook, Greenaway, and Tony Macaulay
1970	"(Blame It) On the Pony Express"	Johnny Johnson and the Bandwagon	7	-	Written by Cook, Greenaway, and Tony Macaulay
1971	"Sunny Honey Girl"	Cliff Richard	19	-	Written by Cook, Greenaway, John Goodison and Tony Hiller
1971	"Something Old, Something New"	The Fantastics	9	-	Written by Cook, Greenaway, and Tony Macaulay
1971	"Here Comes That Rainy Day Feeling Again"	The Fortunes	51	15	Written by Cook, Greenaway, and Tony Macaulay; 1976: Connie Cato, #80 US Country
1971	"Hey Willy"	The Hollies	22	-	Written by Cook, Greenaway, and Allan Clarke
1971	"The Banner Man"	Blue Mink	3	-	Written by Cook, Greenaway, and Herbie Flowers
1971	"We Got a Dream"	Ocean	-	82	
1971	"Freedom Come, Freedom Go"	The Fortunes	6	72	Written by Cook, Greenaway, Albert Hammond and Mike Hazlewood; 1975: Bobby G. Rice, #10 US Country ("Freda Comes, Freda Goes")
1971	"Something Tells Me (Something's Gonna Happen Tonight)"	Cilla Black	3	-	
1971	"I'd Like to Teach the World to Sing (In Perfect Harmony)"	The Hillside Singers	-	13	Written by Cook, Greenaway, Bill Backer and Billy Davis; 1971: The New Seekers, #1 UK, #7 US pop 1996: No Way Sis, #27 UK; 2002: Demi Holborn, #27 UK
1972	"Goin' Down (On the Road to L.A.)"	Terry Black & Laurel Ward	-	57	
1972	"The World I Wish For You"	Cilla Black	51	-	
1972	"Long Cool Woman in a Black Dress"	The Hollies	32	2	Written by Cook, Greenaway, and Allan Clarke; 2008: Clint Black, #58 US Country
1972	"One More Chance"	Ocean	-	76	
1972	"Stay With Me"	Blue Mink	11	-	Written by Cook, Greenaway, and Herbie Flowers
1973	"If It Wasn't for the Reason That I Love You"	Miki Antony	27	-	
1973	"Step Into a Dream"	White Plains	21	-	
1973	"Randy"	Blue Mink	9	-	Written by Cook, Greenaway, and Herbie Flowers
1973	"Like Sister and Brother"	The Drifters	7	-	Written by Cook, Greenaway, and Geoff Stephens; 1980: Frank Hooker & Positive People, #80 US R&B
1974	"Doctor's Orders"	Sunny	7	-	Written by Cook, Greenaway, and Geoff Stephens; 1974: Carol Douglas, #11 US pop, #9 R&B
1974	"Hello Summertime"	Bobby Goldsboro	-	14	Written by Cook, Greenaway, Bill Backer and Billy Davis; Also #79 US Country
1975	"It Oughta Sell a Million"	Lyn Paul	37	-	Written by Cook, Greenaway, Bill Backer and Billy Davis

== Chart hits and other notable songs written by Roger Cook solo or with other writers ==
Year	Song	Original artist	UK Singles Chart	U.S. Pop	Other charting versions, and notes
1974	"Blue Angel"	Gene Pitney	39	-	Written by Cook
1974	"7-6-5-4-3-2-1 (Blow Your Whistle)" (Originally titled "Get Up")	Blue Mink	-	-	Written by Cook; 1975: Gary Toms Empire, #46 US pop, #5 R&B; 1975: The Rimshots, #26 UK pop
1977	"What's Your Name, What's Your Number"	Roger Cook	-	-	Written by Cook and Bobby Woods; 1978: Andrea True Connection, #34 UK, #56 US pop
1978	"Talking In Your Sleep"	Marmalade	-	-	Written by Cook and Bobby Woods; 1978: Crystal Gayle, #11 UK pop, #18 US pop, #1 US Country; 1999: Martine McCutcheon, #6 UK pop
1980	"Years From Now"	Dr. Hook	47	51	Written by Cook and Charles Cochran
1980	"I Believe In You"	Don Williams	-	24	Written by Cook and Sam Hogin; Also #1 US Country
1981	"Miracles"	Don Williams	-	-	Written by Cook #4 US Country
1982	"Livin' in These Troubled Times"	Crystal Gayle	-	-	Written by Cook, Sam Hogin, and Philip Donnelly #9 US Country
1983	"Love Is on a Roll"	Don Williams	-	-	Written by Cook and John Prine #1 US Country
1992	"I Just Want to Dance with You"	Daniel O'Donnell	20	-	Written by Cook and John Prine
1997	"One Night at a Time"	George Strait	-	59	Written by Cook, Eddie Kilgallon and Earl Bud Lee; Also #1 US Country

== Chart hits and other notable songs written by Roger Greenaway with other writers ==
Year	Song	Original artist	UK Singles Chart	U.S. Pop	Other charting versions, and notes
1974	"Kissin' in the Back Row of the Movies"	The Drifters	2	-	Written by Greenaway and Tony Macaulay; Also #83 US R&B
1974	"Down on the Beach Tonight"	The Drifters	7	-	Written by Greenaway and Tony Macaulay
1975	"Love Games"	The Drifters	33	-	Written by Greenaway and Tony Macaulay
1975	"Sweet Cheatin' Rita"	Alvin Stardust	37	-	Written by Greenaway and Geoff Stephens
1975	"There Goes My First Love"	The Drifters	3	-	Written by Greenaway and Barry Mason
1975	"Can I Take You Home Little Girl"	The Drifters	10	-	Written by Greenaway and Barry Mason
1975	"It's Gonna Be a Cold, Cold Christmas"	Dana	4	-	Written by Greenaway and Geoff Stephens
1976	"Hello Happiness"	The Drifters	12	-	Written by Greenaway and Les Reed
1976	"You Just Might See Me Cry"	Our Kid	2	-	Written by Greenaway and Barry Mason
1976	"Jeans On"	David Dundas	3	17	Written by Greenaway and David Dundas
1976	"Every Night's a Saturday Night with You"	The Drifters	29	-	Written by Greenaway and Geoff Stephens
1976	"You're More than a Number in My Little Red Book"	The Drifters	5	-	Written by Greenaway and Tony Macaulay
1977	"Say You'll Stay Until Tomorrow"	Tom Jones	40	15	Written by Greenaway and Barry Mason; Also #1 US Country
1980	"It's Like We Never Said Goodbye"	Crystal Gayle	-	63	Written by Greenaway and Geoff Stephens
1984	"Shooting from the Heart"	Cliff Richard	51	-	Written by Greenaway and Richard Giles
1987	"Doin' the Crab"	Michael Barrymore	81	-	Written by Greenaway and Geoff Stephens
