= Licorice Pizza (soundtrack) =

Licorice Pizza (Original Motion Picture Soundtrack)

Soundtrack album by various artists
- Released: November 26, 2021
- Genre: Film soundtrack
- Length: 74:01
- Label: Republic

Jonny Greenwood chronology
The Power of the Dog (2021)	Licorice Pizza (2021)	Jarak Qaribak (2023)

Licorice Pizza (Original Motion Picture Soundtrack) is the soundtrack for the 2021 film of the same name. It was released by Republic Records on the same date as the film, November 26, 2021. The album was additionally released in physical CD and vinyl on December 10. It featured contemporary music from the 1970s, with artists such as Paul McCartney and Wings, David Bowie, Gordon Lightfoot, Blood, Sweat & Tears, and Chico Hamilton. The album accompanied the film's original score composed by Jonny Greenwood, although none of the original music was released separately as a soundtrack.

== Track listing ==
The track list was officially announced on November 9, 2021.

Licorice Pizza soundtrack
No.	Title	Writer(s)	Artist(s)	Length
1.	"July Tree"	Irma Jurist, Eve Merriam	Nina Simone	2:44
2.	"Stumblin' In"	Mike Chapman, Nicky Chinn	Chris Norman and Suzi Quatro	3:58
3.	"Sometimes I'm Happy"	Vincent Youmans, Irving Caesar	Johnny Guarnieri	4:05
4.	"Ac-Cent-Tchu-Ate the Positive"	Harold Arlen, Johnny Mercer	Bing Crosby and The Andrews Sisters featuring Vic Schoen and his orchestra	2:42
5.	"Blue Sands"	Buddy Collette	Chico Hamilton Quintet featuring Buddy Collette	6:36
6.	"But You're Mine"	Sonny Bono	Sonny & Cher	3:04
7.	"My Ding-a-Ling live at The Fillmore (1967)"	Dave Bartholomew	Chuck Berry featuring Steve Miller Band	4:38
8.	"Peace Frog"	Robby Krieger, Jim Morrison	The Doors	2:52
9.	"Let Me Roll It"	Paul McCartney, Linda McCartney	Paul McCartney and Wings	4:51
10.	"Life On Mars?"	David Bowie	David Bowie	3:52
11.	"Slip Away"	William Armstrong, Marcus Daniel, Wilbur Terrell	Clarence Carter	2:34
12.	"Diamond Girl"	Jim Seals, Dash Crofts	Seals and Crofts	4:13
13.	"Greensleeves"		Mason Williams	2:45
14.	"Barabajagal"	Donovan	Donovan with The Jeff Beck Group, Lesley Duncan, Suzi Quatro and Madeline Bell	3:20
15.	"Softly Whispering I Love You"	Roger Greenaway, Roger Cook	The Congregation	3:02
16.	"Licorice Pizza"	Jonny Greenwood	Jonny Greenwood	3:07
17.	"If You Could Read My Mind"	Gordon Lightfoot	Gordon Lightfoot	3:51
18.	"Walk Away"	Joe Walsh	James Gang	3:35
19.	"Lisa, Listen To Me"	David Clayton-Thomas, Dick Halligan	Blood, Sweat & Tears	2:58
20.	"Tomorrow May Not Be Your Day"	Taj Mahal	Taj Mahal	4:14
Total length:				1:04:01

== Reception ==
=== Critical response ===
Nolan Paul from Hot Press praised the soundtrack as "expertly curated". Complimenting it as "one of the unforgettable film soundtracks", Mikael Pitanguy of Collider commented that "Within the soundtrack, the choice of songs and synchronicity with the scenes couldn't fit better. As a viewer watching this film, you feel the sensation of being young and free in a simpler time, due to this synchronicity previously mentioned"; he also felt that the film score "adds depth to the story and to the characters causing the audience to get emotionally involved in the movie and care about the characters." Analysing on the film's musical choices, Lauren Hurrell of MovieWeb commented it as "The eclectic mix of tracks creates an old-timey jaunt through melancholic woodwind and bittersweet piano riffs on to tender and punchy vocals and the poppy sounds of the '60s and '70s which all aid in illuminating the story". Edward Mawer of Outtake Magazine called the soundtrack and the film as "a refreshingly realistic and enchanting depiction of the spontaneity of youth".

=== Best-of lists ===
Select 2021 year-end rankings of Licorice Pizza in film soundtracks list
Publication	Rank	Ref.
The Film Stage	3	
Collider	7	
Insider Inc.	7	
Little White Lies	10	
The Playlist	—N/a	

== Release history ==
Release dates and formats for Licorice Pizza (Original Motion Picture Soundtrack)
Region	Date	Format(s)	Label	Ref.
Various	November 26, 2021	CD; digital download; streaming	Republic	
Various	December 10, 2021	Vinyl	Republic	
