= Only When I Laugh (Blue Mink album) =

Studio album by Blue Mink
- Released: 1973
- Studio: Morgan Studios, London
- Genre: Pop
- Label: EMI
- Producer: David Mackay

Blue Mink chronology
Live at the Talk Of the Town (1972)	Only When I Laugh (1973)	Fruity (1974)

Only When I Laugh is the fourth album by the British pop group Blue Mink, released in 1973. It was released under the title "Blue Mink" in the U.S., Canada, and New Zealand. Two singles from the album charted in the UK, "By the Devil (I Was Tempted)" at #26 and "Randy" at #9. Most of the tracks were written by Flowers, Cook, and Roger Greenaway.

== Track listing ==
All tracks composed by Herbie Flowers, Roger Cook and Roger Greenaway; except where noted.

Side 1

1. "Watch Out!" – 2:44
2. "Randy" – 3:12
3. "Another 'Without You' Day" (Cook, Greenaway, Steve Jameson, Marshall Doctors) – 3:44
4. "Daughter of Someone" – 3:50
5. "Together" – 4:04
6. "Stay With Me" – 3:12

Side 2

1. "By the Devil (I Was Tempted)" (Guy Fletcher, Doug Flett) – 3:38
2. "You Are the Sunshine of My Life" (Stevie Wonder) – 3:34
3. "Harlem" (Bill Withers) – 2:41
4. "Lonliness" – 3:47
5. "Harmony" – 3:12
6. "Where Did They Go" (Gloria Sklerov, Harry Lloyd) – 4:03

== Personnel ==
Blue Mink

- Madelaine Bell, Roger Cook – vocals
- Alan Parker – guitar
- Herbie Flowers – bass
- Ann Odell, Roger Coulam – keyboards
- Barry Morgan – drums
- Ray Cooper – L.A. percussion

Technical personnel

- Produced by: David Mackay
- Recorded at: Morgan Studios, London
- Engineers: Martin Levan, Paul Tregurtha
- Orchestral Arrangement on "Together" – Ann Odell
- Album Sleeve Art: Malcolm Livingstone, Sutterby, Stobart
