= The Banner Man =

Single by Blue Mink
- B-side: "Mind Your Business"
- Released: May 1971
- Genre: Bubblegum pop
- Length: 3:27
- Songwriters: Roger Cook, Roger Greenaway

"The Banner Man" is a 1971 song by the British pop band Blue Mink. The song managed to reach the top ten on the UK charts peaking at #3 in June 1971. It was released as a single with the B-side "Mind Your Business". The single was written by Blue Mink founders Roger Cook and Roger Greenaway.

In 2002, Robin Carmody of Freaky Trigger named "The Banner Man" the best British bubblegum song of 1971, deeming it Blue Mink's "second masterpiece" after "Melting Pot" (1969) and one of numerous hits written by Cook and Greenaway wrote in the genre. He described it as "Salvation Army-themed" and added: "Its theme is naturally distant from today, but it’s one of the few chartpop records to make ritualism sound like a perfectly normal and enjoyable part of life (which I guess it was back then, at least for more people than now)." Carmody also listed it among the ten best British bubblegum songs, writing: "Ritualism and pop don’t normally go together unless someone can make an arcane ritual sound like the very stuff of pop. This was such a song." Bob Stanley describes "The Banner Man" as a brassy bubblegum song that "made light of the heavy session musician talent in [Blue Mink's] line-up."

== Track listing ==
No.	Title	Writer(s)	Length
1.	"The Banner Man"	Roger Cook, Roger Greenaway	3:27
2.	"Mind Your Business"	Alan Parker, Madeline Bell	3:07

== Weekly charts ==
"The Banner Man" reached the top ten on the UK charts, as well as in Australia and Belgium.

Chart (1971)	Peak position
Australia (Kent Music Report)	4
Belgium (Ultratop 50 Flanders)	4
Germany (GfK)	38
Netherlands (Dutch Top 40)	11
New Zealand (Listener)	2
UK Singles (Official Charts)	3

== Other uses ==
"The Banner Man" appeared in the 1999 film East is East.
