= Sweet Inspiration =

Sweet Inspiration or variants may refer to:

- The Sweet Inspirations, American R&B female vocal group
  - The Sweet Inspirations (album), 1967
  - "Sweet Inspiration" (The Sweet Inspirations song), from the above album
- Sweet Inspiration (Cilla Black album), 1970, featuring the Johnny Johnson and the Bandwagon song
- Sweet Inspiration, album by Delaney Bramlett
- Sweet Inspiration, 2021 album by Kate Ceberano
- "Sweet Inspiration/ Where You Lead", a 1972 Top 40 hit for Barbra Streisand
- "Sweet Inspiration" (Johnny Johnson and the Bandwagon song), 1970
- Sweet Inspiration (The Inspirational Choir album), 1985
- "Sweetest Inspiration", a storyline in the science fiction comedy webtoon series Live with Yourself!
