= Good Morning Freedom =

1970 single by Blue Mink

- Cover of the single released in Germany

Single by Blue Mink
- B-side: "Mary Jane"
- Released: 13 March 1970
- Genre: Pop rock
- Length: 2:49
- Label: Philips
- Songwriters: Roger Greenaway; Roger Cook; Albert Hammond; Mike Hazlewood
- Producer: Blue Mink

Blue Mink singles chronology
"Melting Pot" (1969)	"Good Morning Freedom" (1970)	"Our World" (1970)

Official audio
- "Good Morning Freedom" on YouTube

"Good Morning Freedom" is a song by British pop group Blue Mink, released as a single in March 1970. It was released as a non-album single, but was included on the US album Real Mink. It peaked at number 10 on the UK Singles Chart.

== Track listing ==
1. "Good Morning Freedom" – 2:49
2. "Mary Jane" – 3:14

== Personnel ==
- Madeline Bell – vocals
- Roger Cook – vocals
- Roger Coulam – keyboards
- Alan Parker – guitar
- Herbie Flowers – bass guitar
- Barry Morgan – drums

== Charts ==
Chart (1970)	Peak position
Australia (Kent Music Report)	33
Belgium (Ultratop 50 Flanders)	4
Belgium (Ultratop 50 Wallonia)	37
Canada Top Singles (RPM)	100
Germany (GfK)	31
Ireland (IRMA)	10
Netherlands (Dutch Top 40)	5
Netherlands (Single Top 100)	6
New Zealand (Listener)	13
UK Singles (Official Charts)	10

== Popular culture and covers ==
- In May 1970, American band Daybreak released a cover of the song as their only single and it peaked at number 94 on the Billboard Hot 100.
- In 1971, Australian guitarist John Williams covered the song on his album Changes.
- In 1973, British duo Peters and Lee covered the song on their debut album We Can Make It.
- In 1994, a cover by Elton John, recorded in 1970, was released on the compilation album Chartbusters Go Pop.
- In 2000, American singer Madeline Bell released her own cover of the song on her album Blessed.
- In 2009, the song featured prominently in the Breaking Bad episode "4 Days Out".
- In 2011, the song featured in an advert for skin care brand Freederm.
- In 2013, Albert Hammond released a version on his live album Songbook 2013 – Live in Wilhelmshaven.
