= List of number-one singles in 1972 (New Zealand) =

This is a list of number-one hit singles in 1972 in New Zealand, starting with the first chart dated, 14 January 1972.

== Chart ==
Week	Artist	Title
7 January 1972	Summer break - no chart	Summer break - no chart
14 January 1972	John Lennon	"Imagine"
21 January 1972	John Lennon	"Imagine"
28 January 1972	John Lennon	"Imagine"
4 February 1972	John Lennon	"Imagine"
11 February 1972	John Lennon	"Imagine"
18 February 1972	Daniel Boone	"Daddy Don't You Walk So Fast"
25 February 1972	Les Crane	"Desiderata"
3 March 1972	New Seekers	"I'd Like to Teach the World to Sing (In Perfect Harmony)"
10 March 1972	New Seekers	"I'd Like to Teach the World to Sing (In Perfect Harmony)"
17 March 1972	Melanie	"Brand New Key"
24 March 1972	The Mom and Dads	"Ranger's Waltz"
31 March 1972	The Congregation	"Softly Whispering I Love You"
7 April 1972	The Congregation	"Softly Whispering I Love You"
14 April 1972	Don McLean	"American Pie"
21 April 1972	Don McLean	"American Pie"
28 April 1972	Don McLean	"American Pie"
5 May 1972	Chicory Tip	"Son of My Father"
12 May 1972	Chicory Tip	"Son of My Father"
19 May 1972	Nilsson	"Without You"
26 May 1972	Nilsson	"Without You"
2 June 1972	Royal Scots Dragoon Guards	"Amazing Grace"
9 June 1972	Royal Scots Dragoon Guards	"Amazing Grace"
17 June 1972	Royal Scots Dragoon Guards	"Amazing Grace"
23 June 1972	Mouth & MacNeal	"How Do You Do"
30 June 1972	Daniel Boone	"Beautiful Sunday"
7 July 1972	Daniel Boone	"Beautiful Sunday"
14 July 1972	Neil Diamond	"Song Sung Blue"
21 July 1972	Neil Diamond	"Song Sung Blue"
28 July 1972	Doctor Hook	"Sylvia's Mother"
4 August 1972	Doctor Hook	"Sylvia's Mother"
11 August 1972	Doctor Hook	"Sylvia's Mother"
18 August 1972	Doctor Hook	"Sylvia's Mother"
25 August 1972	Doctor Hook	"Sylvia's Mother"
1 September 1972	Donny Osmond	"Puppy Love"
8 September 1972	Donny Osmond	"Puppy Love"
15 September 1972	Donny Osmond	"Puppy Love"
22 September 1972	Donny Osmond	"Puppy Love"
29 September 1972	Donny Osmond	"Puppy Love"
6 October 1972	Donny Osmond	"Puppy Love"
13 October 1972	Donny Osmond	"Puppy Love"
20 October 1972	Donny Osmond	"Puppy Love"
27 October 1972	Three Dog Night	"Black & White"
3 November 1972	Three Dog Night	"Black & White"
10 November 1972	Three Dog Night	"Black & White"
17 November 1972	Three Dog Night	"Black & White"
24 November 1972	Three Dog Night	"Black & White"
1 December 1972	Arlo Guthrie	"City of New Orleans"
8 December 1972	Arlo Guthrie	"City of New Orleans"
15 December 1972	Lieutenant Pigeon	"Mouldy Old Dough"
23 December 1972	Lieutenant Pigeon	"Mouldy Old Dough"
30 December 1972	Lieutenant Pigeon	"Mouldy Old Dough"
