= Scream for Help (album) =

Soundtrack album by John Paul Jones
- Released: 22 March 1985
- Recorded: September 1984
- Studio: Sunday School Studio, Devon
- Genre: Rock, blues rock
- Length: 39:31
- Label: Atlantic
- Producer: John Paul Jones

John Paul Jones chronology
Coda (1982)	Scream for Help (1985)	The Sporting Life (1994)

Professional ratings
Review scores
Source	Rating
Allmusic	2.5/5 stars

Scream for Help is a soundtrack album by John Paul Jones, released by Atlantic Records on 22 March 1985 to accompany the film Scream for Help. Following the Death Wish II album project, guitarist Jimmy Page was asked by his neighbour, movie director Michael Winner, to record a soundtrack for the film Scream for Help in August 1984. Due to other commitments by Page, he instead suggested to Winner that Jones, who had just completed upgrading his 24-track digital recording studio at Devon, was best placed to write and record the soundtrack. In return, Jones asked Page to help record two tracks "Crackback" and "Spaghetti Junction".

The musical score differs in style from the Death Wish pentalogy of films, with Winner requesting that a minimum 70 piece orchestra backing be used for the soundtrack in addition to Jones' rock arrangements. Besides Page, folk guitarist John Renbourn assists on guitar, and Yes singer Jon Anderson sessioned on vocals as well as Madeline Bell, for whom Jones had previous produced, composed, recorded, and played all the instruments for her solo album Comin' Atcha in December 1973. Jones sings lead vocals on "When You Fall in Love". Jacinda Baldwin (a.k.a. Jacinda Jones), Jones' daughter is co-writer on two tracks. It was his first full-length album release since the break-up of Led Zeppelin.

The vinyl soundtrack had been unavailable in the US and UK for many years and was only obtainable on special import from Japan. The album has since been released on CD format in 2000 by WEA International.

== Track listing ==
1985 vinyl & cassette editions Side one
No.	Title	Writer(s)	Length
1.	"Spaghetti Junction"	John Paul Jones	5:01
2.	"Bad Child"	Jones, Jacinda Baldwin	5:46
3.	"Silver Train"	Jones, Jon Anderson	3:48
4.	"Crackback"	Jones, Jimmy Page	4:16

Side two
No.	Title	Writer(s)	Length
1.	"Chilli Sauce"	Jones	4:59
2.	"Take It or Leave It"	Jones, Madeline Bell	4:28
3.	"Christie"	Jones	3:08
4.	"When You Fall in Love"	Jones, Jacinda Baldwin	3:36
5.	"Here I Am"	Jones, Simon Bell	4:43

1985 German pressed vinyl Side one
No.	Title	Writer(s)	Length
1.	"Spaghetti Junction"	Jones	5:01
2.	"Bad Child"	Jones, Baldwin	5:46
3.	"Take It or Leave It"	Jones, M. Bell	4:28
4.	"Chilli Sauce"	Jones	4:59

Side two
No.	Title	Writer(s)	Length
1.	"Silver Train"	Jones, Anderson	3:48
2.	"Christie"	Jones	3:08
3.	"Here I Am"	Jones, S. Bell	4:43
4.	"When You Fall in Love"	Jones, Baldwin	3:36
5.	"Crackback"	Jones, Page	4:16

2000 Compact disc edition
Same track listing and order as the vinyl release.

== Personnel ==
- John Paul Jones – keyboards, synthesizer, bass guitar, guitars, backing vocals, producer, lead vocals on "When You Fall In Love" and "Bad Child"
- Jimmy Page – electric guitar (tracks 1 & 4)
- Jon Anderson – vocals (tracks 3 & 7)
- Madeline Bell – vocals (tracks 6 & 9)
- John Renbourn – acoustic guitar
- Graham Ward – drums, percussion
- Colin Green – backing vocals
- Royal Philharmonic Orchestra – orchestra
- The Johnny Pearson Studio Orchestra – orchestra
- Howard Blake – conductor
- Johnny Pearson – conductor
- Robin Clarke – mixing

== Additional notes ==
Catalogue: Atlantic Records 7 80190 1

Co-writer on "Here I Am" is Simon Bell, then backing singer for Madeline Bell before his more famous association with Dusty Springfield

== Singles ==
"Here I Am" was recorded but left off the first-release vinyl soundtrack album. It features as the A-side of the promo single, backed with "Christie". Released as a promotional single in the UK only.
