= Only When I Laugh =

Only When I Laugh may refer to:

- Only When I Laugh (film), a 1981 film based on Neil Simon's play The Gingerbread Lady
  - "Only When I Laugh" (song), the 1981 title tune to the film recorded by Brenda Lee
  - Only When I Laugh (Brenda Lee album), the 1981 album from which the song appeared on by Brenda Lee
- Only When I Laugh (TV series), a 1970s/1980s British sitcom
- Only When I Laugh (Blue Mink album), a 1973 album by Blue Mink
- Only When I Laugh (play), a play based on the sitcom by Eric Chappell
- Only When I Laugh, a book by Jim Backus and Henny Backus
- Only When I Laugh, an autobiography by Paul Merton.

== See also ==
- Only When I Larf, a 1968 novel by Len Deighton
- Only When I Larf (film), a 1968 adaptation of Deighton's novel
- It only hurts when I laugh
