= Sweet Inspiration (Cilla Black album) =

Studio album by Cilla Black
- Released: 3 July 1970
- Recorded: 1969/1970 at Abbey Road Studios, London
- Genre: Pop, Soul
- Label: Parlophone/EMI; PCS7103 (stereo)
- Producer: George Martin

Cilla Black chronology
Surround Yourself with Cilla (1969)	Sweet Inspiration (1970)	Images (1971)

Sweet Inspiration is Cilla Black's fifth solo studio album, released in 1970 by Parlophone Records. The album peaked at number 42 in the UK Albums Chart in July 1970.

== Re-release ==
On September 7, 2009, EMI Records released a special edition of the album exclusively to digital download. This re-issue features all of the album's original recordings re-mastered by Abbey Road Studios from original 1/4" stereo master tapes. A digital booklet containing original album artwork, detailed track information and rare photographs will be available from iTunes with purchases of the entire album re-issue.

== Track listing ==
Side one

1. "Sweet Inspiration" (John Cameron)
2. "Put a Little Love in Your Heart" (Jimmy Holiday, Randy Myers, Jackie DeShannon)
3. "The April Fools" (Burt Bacharach, Hal David)
4. "I Can't Go on Living Without You" (Elton John, Bernie Taupin)
5. "From Both Sides Now" (Joni Mitchell)
6. "Across the Universe" (John Lennon, Paul McCartney)

Side B

1. "Black Paper Roses" (Belle Gonzalez)
2. "Mysterious People (Det Gåtfulla Folket)" (Olle Adolphson, Hal Shaper)
3. "Dear Madame" (Les Reed, Geoff Stephens)
4. "Oh Pleasure Man" (Roger Cook, Roger Greenaway, Albert Hammond, Mike Hazlewood)
5. "Little Pleasure Acre" (Roger Greenaway, Roger Cook)
6. "For Once in My Life" (Orlando Murden, Ron Miller)
7. "Rule Britannia" (Thomas Augustine Arne)

== Personnel ==
- Cilla Black - lead vocals
- George Martin - producer
- Caroline Arber - album cover photography

== Charts ==
Chart (1970)	Peak position
UK Albums Chart	42
