= Gideon (TV series) =

French animated television series

Gideon was a late 1970s/early 1980s animated French children's television series.

This basic animation was centered on Gideon, a duck with an unusually long neck. Gideon's abnormality was the subject of cruel taunts and jibes from the other ducks – who all had normal-length necks – but good always came out in the end.

Gideon originated as a series of French storybooks, written by Benjamin Rabier in 1923, under the name Gédéon. In the 1970s French television produced the cartoon series, directed and co-written by Michel Ocelot made into 60 five-minute episodes, which was then sold to the United Kingdom television company Yorkshire Television and made into an English-language version and the original French 60 five-minute episodes was edited into 30 ten-minute episodes each episode having two episodes merged into one story. It was directed by Steve Haynes and featured music by Alan Parker ex Blue Mink. It was shown on ITV between 1979 and 1981 with repeats until 1985 in the UK, and on Pinwheel in the 1980s in the US.

Goodie Tim Brooke-Taylor narrated the series, as well as providing all the voices – he estimated he had to do around 57 voices for all the various characters, which included Winston the circus dog, Cornelia the tortoise, Stalker the poacher and even flying rabbits.

== Characters ==
- Growler the dog
- Sosthène the rabbit
- Grognard the dog
- Bout-de-zan the monkey
- Boudinet the pig
- Noiraud the crow
- Mimolette the mouse
