= Holocaust humor =

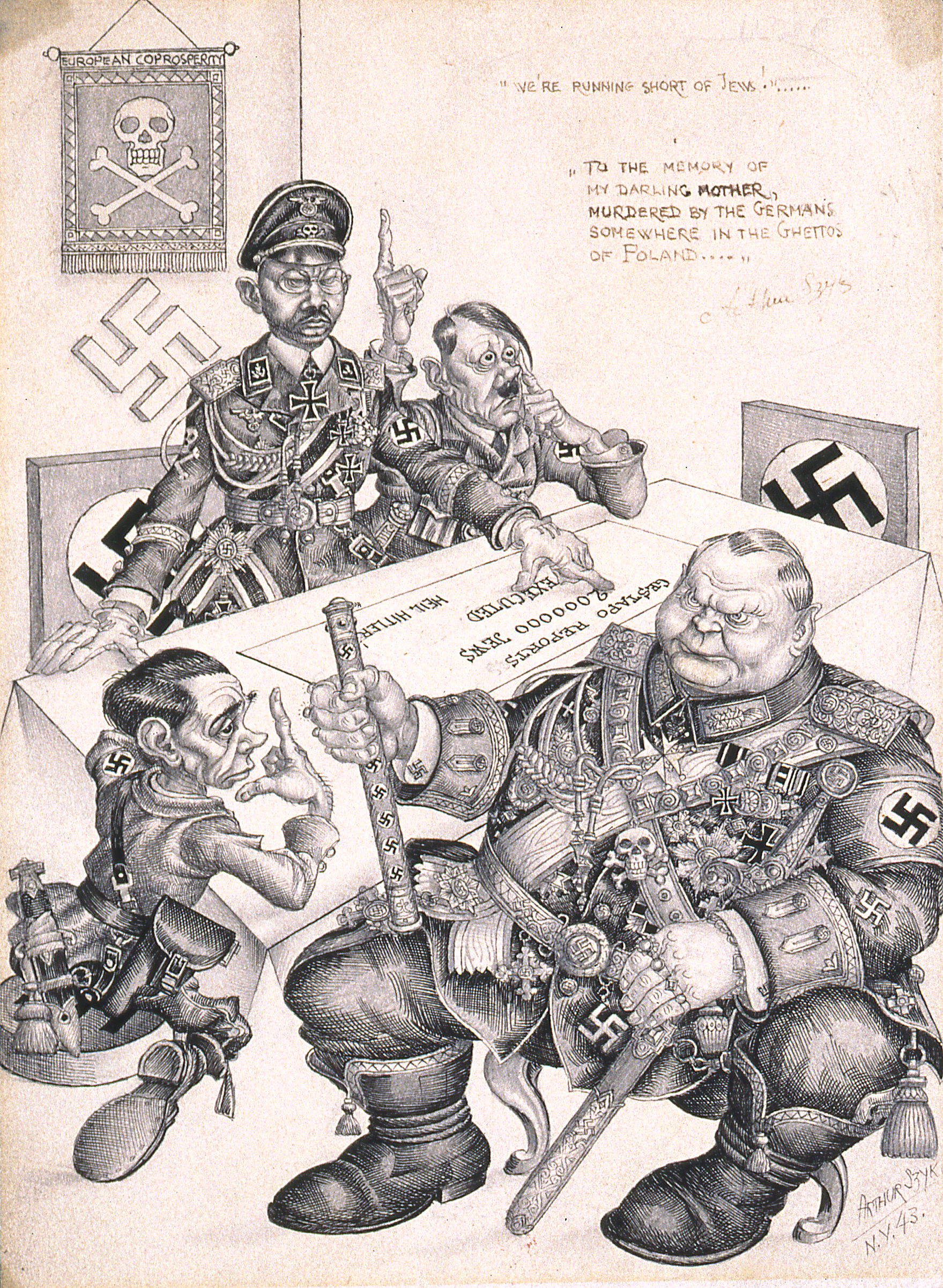
Arthur Szyk, "We're Running Short of Jews", 1943

There are several major aspects of humor related to the Holocaust: humor of the Jews in Nazi Germany and in Nazi concentration and extermination camps, a specific kind of "gallows humor"; German humor on the subject during the Nazi era, and the appropriateness of antisemitic or off-color humor in the modern era. Although in some contexts it can be accepted by the social surroundings, it is a very risky choice of humor.

== Aspects of Holocaust humor ==
The 2011 book Dead Funny by Rudolph Herzog explores, among other things, the first two aspects: the humor of the oppressed and the humor of the oppressors. One of Herzog's points is that the German humor of the era reveals the extent to which ordinary German citizens were aware of the atrocities of the regime.

Chaya Ostrower, a pioneer in Holocaust humor research, maintained that humor was a defense mechanism that helped to endure the atrocities of the Holocaust. She wrote that until recently the question of humor in concentration camps was little known to the general public and had little attention in scientific community. Among many reasons for this was the common belief that the discussion of humor in the Holocaust may be seen as diminishing the Holocaust, hurting the feelings of the inmates, and trivializing the issue of extermination - if it was possible to laugh, then it was not so terrible after all. Another reason is the reluctance of the survivors to recall harsh memories associated with the unnatural circumstances that evoked humor. Also, the scholars treated humor to be only of second importance in the life of Holocaust survivors. In 2009 Yad Vashem published a book in Hebrew "Without humor we would have committed suicide". In 2014 it was published also in English "It kept us alive: humor as a defense mechanism in the Holocaust". In this book you can find interviews with 55 Holocaust survivors, carried out by Dr. Ostrower where the main question was "Can you describe or tell us about humor in the Holocaust?"

Terrence Des Pres, Sander Gilman, and Sidra DeKoven Ezrahi were among the first scholars to consider the appropriateness of humor about the Holocaust and who has the right to tell Holocaust jokes.

Considering the jokes about the Holocaust, one has to distinguish the "gallows humor", i.e., the humor of the victims, from the humor of the oppressors of the particular social group, which is called "executioner's humor" by Alan Dundes. The "gallows humor" is a coping mechanism, while "executioner's humor" is an instrument of aggression.

=== Holocaust humor of Nazi ghettos and camps ===
Viktor Frankl, a psychiatrist and a Holocaust survivor of the Auschwitz concentration camp, in his 1946 book Man's Search for Meaning wrote: "To discover that there was any semblance of art in a concentration camp must be surprise enough for an outsider, but he may be even more astonished to hear that one could find a sense of humor there as well; of course, only the faint trace of one, and then only for a few seconds or minutes. Humor was another of the soul's weapons in the fight for self-preservation"... "The attempt to develop a sense of humor and to see things in a humorous light is some kind of a trick learned while mastering the art of living." Frankl further gives an example of humor in dreary circumstances. They were being transported to another camp and the train was approaching the bridge across the Danube. Over the river was the Mauthausen death camp. "Those who have never seen anything similar cannot possibly imagine the dance of joy performed in the carriage by the prisoners when they saw that our transport was not crossing the bridge and was instead heading only for Dachau." When the inmates learned that there was no crematorium in the camp, they "laughed and cracked jokes in spite of, and during, all we had to go through." "An abnormal response to an abnormal situation is in the nature of normal behavior".

Chaya Ostrower recognized three major categories of jokes in the book of interviews, Without Humor We Would Have Committed Suicide: self-humor, black humor, and humor about food. She noticed that food jokes were unique for the Holocaust period.

Self-humour: One of the interviewees in Without Humor... was telling about their hair being cut upon arrival to Auschwitz. Many women were crying, but she started laughing. When asked why, she answered that never in her life had she had a hairdo for free.

Black humor was a means of reducing anxiety of the awareness of death. An example well-known in Warsaw: "Moishe, why are you using soap with so much fragrance?" - "When they turn me into soap, at least I will smell good". Jokes about soap were in response to rumors which started circulating in 1942 about soap produced from the fat of the Jews. Other jokes of this kind: "See you again on the same shelf!" or "Don't eat much: the Germans will have less soap!"

Humor about food constituted about 7 percent of humor discussed in the study. The interviewees mention that there was lots of humor about food, because food was a common subject, because there was never enough of it. An interviewee recalls: there was a group which liked to discuss recipes. Suddenly one of them lost her mood and stopped talking. "What's wrong with her?" - "I think her cake has burned".

The Holocaust-era archive clandestinely collected by a team led by Holocaust victim Emmanuel Ringelblum ("Ringelblum Archive") documented the everyday life in Nazi-organized Jewish ghettos, in particular, the Warsaw Ghetto. Among other things, the archive documented the humor perspective of the inhumane Jewish life. The archive includes jokes about Poles, Nazis, Hitler, Stalin, etc. A good deal of them were self-jokes about life, death, disease, hunger, and humiliation.

Joseph Wulf in "Vom Leben. Kampf und Tod im Ghetto Warsau" cites a number of black jokes from diaries of Warsaw ghetto residents, such as:

Horowitz passed to the other world and sees Christ in the paradise. He asks "What is this Jew without an armband doing here?" St. Peter anwers: "Leave him alone. He is the son of the property owner."

=== Modern times ===
Telling Holocaust jokes in public may be illegal in Germany.

==== Antisemitism ====
Demonstrating that Holocaust humor is international, Dundes and Hauschild cite two versions of a joke recorded in Germany and the United States in the early 1980s: "How many Jews will fit a Volkswagen" – "506: six in the seats and 500 in the ashtrays".

==== Admissibility of Holocaust humor ====
In a 1988 article "Holocaust Laughter", Terrence Des Pres argues that "a comic response is more resilient, more effective in revolt against terror and the sources of terror than a response that is solemn or tragic".

Adam Muller and Amy Freier note that in modern times increasingly many people are becoming comfortable joking about the Holocaust. They attribute this, among other reasons, to the fact that since the generation of Holocaust survivors had passed, and there is no more witnesses of the atrocities, who could provide emotional firsthand testimonies. Nevertheless the "Holocaust etiquette" prescribes to consider it as a unique, solemn and, to a degree, sacred event, and laughter related to the matter disrupts this convention and is viewed as bad taste. Some other people see modern Holocaust "comedy as a vehicle for coming to terms with the memory of Nazis' horrors".

==== Public controversies ====
- 2009: Despite being Jewish herself, Roseanne Barr was heavily criticized for her photo-shot of Hitler with a tray of "burnt Jew cookies" for a satirical Jewish magazine Heeb.
- 2016: Katie Waissel competed in the British reality series Celebrity Big Brother 18 in 2016. Housemate Christopher Biggins was removed after making a racist joke about the Holocaust towards Waissel, who is Jewish.
- 2020: Concerns and controversies at the 2020 Summer Olympics: On 21 July 2021, Japanese media reported that Kentarō Kobayashi, who was the director of the opening and closing ceremonies, utilized the Holocaust by Nazi Germany in a script for his comedy in 1998, and he made malicious and antisemitic jokes including "Let's play Jews genocide game (Let's play Holocaust)." After that Kobayashi was dismissed by the Olympic Committee.
- 2022: British comedian Jimmy Carr received a significant amount of backlash after saying that the Romani Holocaust was a "positive" during his Netflix comedy special, His Dark Material. Carr's remarks were widely condemned by Holocaust memorial and anti-racism charities, as well as by a number of politicians in the UK, with calls for Netflix to remove the special from its library.

== In film ==
- Jojo Rabbit (2019)
- The Bloom of Yesterday (2016)
- The Last Laugh (2016), a documentary which explored the limits of humor regarding the Holocaust
- Jakob the Liar (1999)
- La Vita è Bella (Life Is Beautiful) (1997)
- Train of Life (1998)
- Europa, Europa (1990)

== See also ==
- It Only Hurts When I Laugh
- The Holocaust in the arts and popular culture
- Humor based on the September 11 attacks
