= Comin' Atcha (album) =

Studio album by Madeline Bell
- Released: December 1973
- Recorded: October 1973 at Morgan Studios, London; December 1973 at Dormouse Studio, Sussex
- Genre: Jazz fusion, soul, rock
- Length: 39:31
- Label: RCA
- Producer: John Paul Jones

Madeline Bell chronology
| I'm Gonna Make You Love Me (1968) | Comin' Atcha (1973) | This Is One Girl (1976) |

Professional ratings
Review scores
| Source | Rating |
|---|---|
| Allmusic | 3.5/5 stars |

Comin' Atcha is the fourth studio album by Madeline Bell, released by RCA Records in December 1973. The album was produced, arranged, and recorded with John Paul Jones at his home studio, Dormouse Studios. It was Madeline Bell's first solo album in two years after performing for musical theatre, television shows, studio backing sessions, film themes, and pop group Blue Mink (1969–73). The project was also a major departure in musical direction for John Paul Jones, playing a mixture of funk, jazz, R&B and soul for the recording during the year-long absence from touring Led Zeppelin undertook in late 1973 and throughout 1974. John Paul Jones had previously sessioned for Madeline Bell in 1968, before joining Led Zeppelin.

Both Bell and Jones performed the album's title track on BBC2's television programme Colour My Soul on 6 December 1973.

== Track listing ==
All tracks composed by John Paul Jones and Madeline Bell

1. "Make a Move" - 5:01
2. "Without You (I Know What I'll Do)" - 5:46
3. "I'm So Glad" - 3:48
4. "Gram" - 4:16
5. "Another Girl" - 4:59
6. "Comin' Atcha" - 3:19
7. "Little Ones" - 3:08
8. "I Wanna Be Around (You!!)" - 3:36
9. "Things" - 4:33
10. "That's What It's All About" - 3:11

== Personnel ==
- Madeline Bell - vocals
- John Paul Jones - keyboards, synthesiser, bass guitar, guitars, backing vocals, producer, engineer
- Jean-Pierre "Rolling" Azoulay - guitar
- Barry De Souza, Tony Newman - drums
- Jim Lawless - percussion
- Barry St. John, Doris Troy, Jacques Ploquin, Liza Strike, Mo Jones - backing vocals
- David Katz - conductor

== Additional notes ==
Catalogue: RCA Records SF 8393
