= Gary Toms Empire =

- Origin: New York City
- Genres: Funk, R&B, disco
- Years active: 1973–1980s
- Labels: P.I.P (Pickwick), Mercury, Chaz Ro, Dejon
- Past members: Gary Toms; Helen Jacobs; Rick Kenny; Eric Oliver; Les Rose; John Freeman; Rick Murray; Warren Tesoro

The Gary Toms Empire was an American funk, R&B and disco band from New York City, whose hit records in the 1970s included "7-6-5-4-3-2-1 (Blow Your Whistle)".

== Career ==
The band was formed by keyboardist Gary Toms, who had been performing and touring since the 1950s with Jimmy Smith and others. When he set up the Gary Toms Empire in 1973, other band members included Helen Jacobs (vocals), Rick Kenny (guitar), Eric Oliver (trumpet), Les Rose (saxophone), John Freeman (bass), Rick Murray (drums), and Warren Tesoro (percussion). Their first record was a version of British songwriter Roger Cook's composition, which had originally been recorded as "Get Up" by Blue Mink, on their 1974 album Fruity. Retitled "7-6-5-4-3-2-1 (Blow Your Whistle)", and with production by Bill Stahl and Rick Bleiweiss, the song was recorded by the Gary Toms Empire and reached number 5 on the Billboard R&B chart in 1975 and sold over 30.000 copies in the first week alone. The band followed up its success with a disco version of the Beatles' "Drive My Car", one of the first promotional 12-inch singles, which reached number 32 on the R&B chart and number 69 on the pop chart. They also released an album, 7-6-5-4-3-2-1 Blow Your Whistle, on the Pickwick Records subsidiary P.I.P. label. They played the Apollo Theater, American Bandstand with Dick Clark, and toured the US.

Gary Toms had a minor solo hit in 1976 with "Stand Up and Shout", but re-established the group name before their final chart hit, "Welcome to Harlem", which reached number 78 on the R&B chart in 1978. The group also released a second album, Let's Do It Again, on Mercury Records in 1978, and singles on the Chaz Ro and Dejon labels in the early 1980s.

== See also ==
- Mercury Records
