= Hallelujah (Deep Purple song) =

Single by Deep Purple
- B-side: "April Part I"
- Released: 25 July 1969
- Recorded: 7 & 12 June 1969
- Length: 3:38
- Label: Harvest (UK); Tetragrammaton (US)
- Songwriter(s): Roger Greenaway; Roger Cook
- Producer(s): Deep Purple

Deep Purple singles chronology
"Emmaretta" (1969)	"Hallelujah" (1969)	"Black Night" (1970)

"Hallelujah" is a song by English hard rock group Deep Purple, released in 1969. It is the first single to feature singer Ian Gillan and bassist Roger Glover and released in-between their 1969 eponymous album and the live Concerto for Group and Orchestra. The B-side was an edit of the instrumental album track "April".

The track was recorded on 7 and 12 June 1969. At the time, Glover had not yet joined the band and played on the track as a session musician.

The song was written by Roger Greenaway and Roger Cook, and originally released as "I am the Preacher" by The Derek Lawrence Statement earlier the same year. Deep Purple's cover version flopped, despite TV appearances to promote the record in the UK. Guitarist Ritchie Blackmore told the Record Mirror that the new band "need to have a commercial record in Britain", and described the song as "an in-between sort of thing"—a median between what the band would normally make but with an added commercial motive. Gillan was unhappy about the single because he did not write the lyrics.

== Charts ==
Chart (1969)	Peak position
Austria (Ö3 Austria Top 40)	16

== Sources ==
- Gillan, Ian; Cohen, David (1993). Child in Time – The Life Story of the Singer from Deep Purple. Smith Gryphon Limited. ISBN 1-85685-048-X.
