= I Was Kaiser Bill's Batman =

Single by Whistling Jack Smith
- B-side: "The British Grin and Bear"
- Released: 3 February 1967
- Recorded: 9 January 1967
- Studio: Decca, London
- Genre: Novelty
- Length: 2:22
- Label: Deram
- Songwriters: Roger Greenaway; Roger Cook
- Producer: Noel Walker

Whistling Jack Smith singles chronology
| "I Was Kaiser Bill's Batman" (1967) | "Hey There Little Miss Mary" (1967) |

"I Was Kaiser Bill's Batman" was a hit single in 1967 composed by British songwriters Roger Cook and Roger Greenaway. It was a novelty record, performed mostly by whistling. The name Whistling Jack Smith, credited on the most commercially successful recording, was a play on the name of the baritone singer of the 1920s, 1930s and 1940s, Whispering Jack Smith.

== Production ==
The tune was written by Greenaway and Cook and was originally titled "Too Much Birdseed". It was recorded as a single for Deram Records by record producer Noel Walker, using studio musicians together with the Mike Sammes Singers. The whistling on the record was, according to most sources, by John O'Neill, a trumpeter and singer with the Mike Sammes Singers who was known for his whistling skill, though other sources credit Noel Walker for the whistling. O'Neill was only paid a flat fee for his participation in the recording, and did not receive royalty payments once the single became a hit.

A novelty song, the title does not refer to the superhero of the same name, but rather to a military batman, a soldier assigned as a servant to an officer. "I Was Kaiser Bill's Batman" contained a variety of instruments in the backing, including additional whistling, electric organ, guitar, bass and drums. The song was recorded on 9 January 1967 at Decca Studios.

== Release and commercial performance ==
Credited to Whistling Jack Smith, "I Was Kaiser Bill's Batman" was released through Deram Records on 3 February 1967, with the B-side "The British Grin and Bear" written by Walker. When it was featured on Top of the Pops, actor Coby Wells was used to mime the whistling, and later toured as the public face of Whistling Jack Smith. Wells' real name was Billy Moeller, a brother of Tommy Moeller, lead vocalist, guitarist, and pianist with Unit 4 + 2. The recording reached #5 on the UK singles chart in March 1967, staying in the chart for 12 weeks. It peaked at #20 on the Billboard Hot 100 in the U.S.

The single was awarded a gold disc for the sales of 1 million copies worldwide.

== Chart performance ==
=== Weekly charts ===
| Chart (1967) | Peak position |
|---|---|
| Austria (Disc Parade) | 3 |
| Australia (Go-Set) | 24 |
| Belgium (Ultratop 50 Flanders) | 5 |
| Belgium (Ultratop 50 Wallonia) | 21 |
| Canada (RPM) | 11 |
| Denmark (DR Top 20) | 3 |
| Ireland (RTÉ) | 9 |
| Netherlands (Dutch Top 40) | 2 |
| Netherlands (Single Top 100) | 2 |
| New Zealand (Listener) | 20 |
| South Africa (Springbok Radio) | 1 |
| Sweden (Kvällstoppen) | 11 |
| Sweden (Tio i Topp) | 5 |
| Rhodesia (Lyons Maid) | 7 |
| UK (Disc and Music Echo) | 5 |
| UK (Melody Maker) | 6 |
| UK (New Musical Express) | 5 |
| UK (Record Retailer) | 5 |
| US Billboard Hot 100 | 20 |
| US Easy Listening (Billboard) | 8 |
| US Cash Box Top 100 | 14 |
| US Record World 100 Top Pops]] | 15 |
| US Record World Top Non-Rock | 3 |
| West Germany (Media Control) | 4 |

=== Year-end charts ===
| Chart (1967) | Peak position |
|---|---|
| Austria (Disc Parade) | 10 |
| Belgium (Ultratop 50 Flanders) | 37 |
| Netherlands (Dutch Top 40) | 17 |
| South Africa (Springbok Radio) | 7 |
| UK (Record Retailer) | 67 |
| West Germany (Media Control) | 7 |
