= Roger Coulam =

British musician

Roger Keith Coulam (21 August 1940 in Blackburn, Lancashire, England – 23 October 2005) was a British keyboard session musician, who formed Blue Mink in the autumn of 1969, with Madeline Bell (vocalist), Roger Cook (vocalist), Alan Parker (guitarist), Herbie Flowers (bassist), and Barry Morgan (drummer).

== Career ==
Artists Coulam worked with included:

- Robert Priddy trio at the Grotto Club, Baker Street
- The Roger Coulam Quartet (1967)
- The Shubdubs / Jimmy Nicol & The Shubdubs (Jimmie Nicol; Johnny Harris)
- Don Partridge (1968)
- Matthews' Southern Comfort
  - Matthews' Southern Comfort (1969)
  - Later That Same Year (1971)
- Je t'aime... moi non-plus (1969, Jane Birkin and Serge Gainsbourg version)
- Poet and the One Man Band (1969) (Heads Hands & Feet; Johnny Harris; Albert Lee; Jerry Donahue; Fotheringay)
- CCS
- Ugly Custard (1970)
- Billie Davis (1970)
- Histoire de Melody Nelson (1971)
- Where Did They Go (1972, Sandie Shaw version)
- Georgia Brown (1972)
- Jesus Christ Superstar (1973 Film Soundtrack)
- Typically Tropical (1975)
- Nick Ingman (1976 & 2006)
- Alan Price (2001)

== Credits ==
Allmusic.com lists Coulam with 31 credits from 1969 to 2012.
