= David and Jonathan (band) =

British pop duo

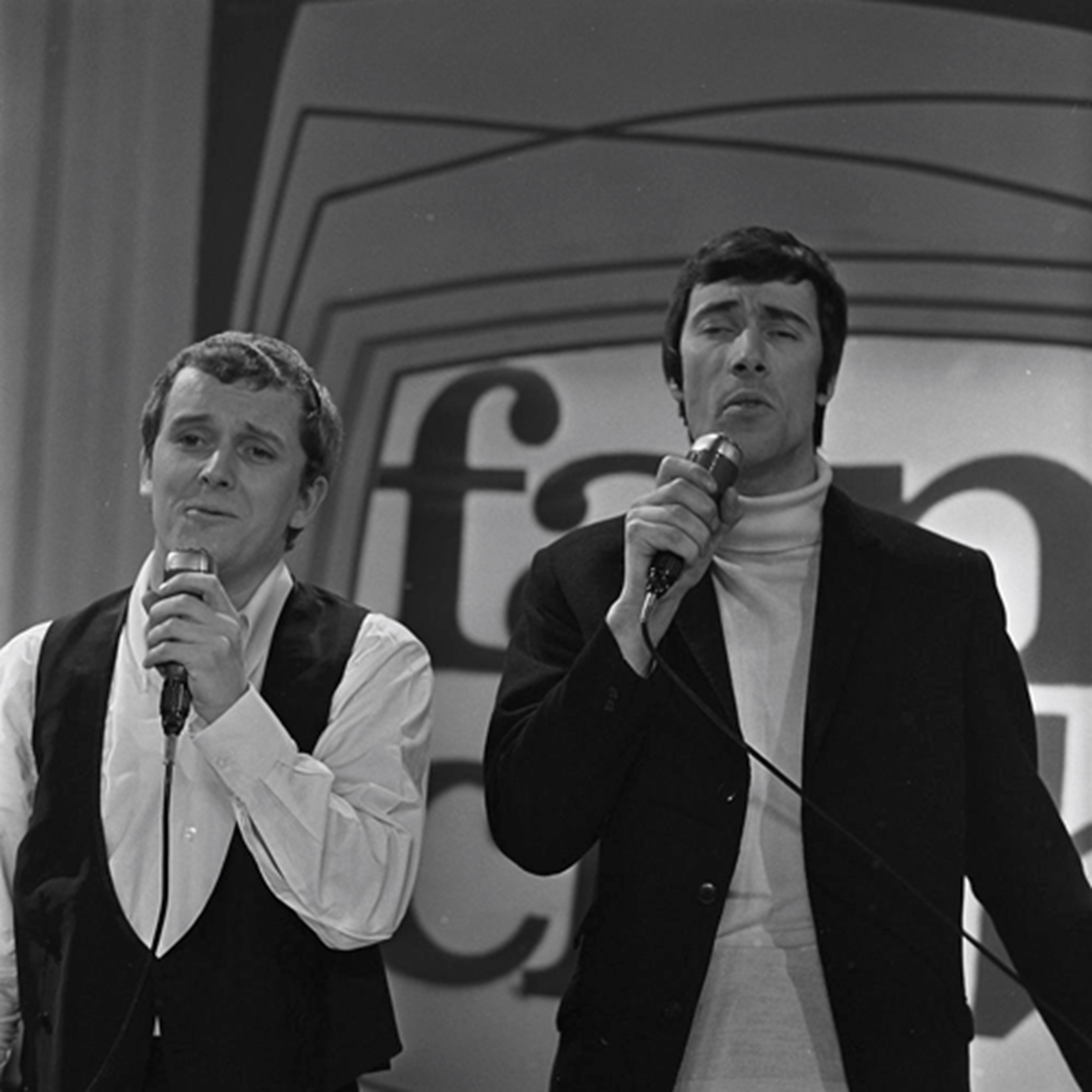
David and Jonathan (Dutch TV, 1967)

David and Jonathan were a British pop duo from Bristol, England, featuring Roger Greenaway and Roger Cook. They had two top 20 hits in 1966.

== Career ==
Greenaway and Cook began working together in 1965 in Bristol, England and wrote the hit songs "This Golden Ring" and "You've Got Your Troubles" for the British group the Fortunes. They teamed with George Martin to record a cover of the Beatles' "Michelle", which was a hit single in 1966 in both the UK (No. 11 UK Singles Chart) and the US (Billboard Hot 100 No. 18, US Adult Contemporary chart No. 3). They had a top 10 in the UK, also in 1966, with "Lovers of the World Unite", which reached No. 7.

The stage names "David and Jonathan" were suggested by Judy Lockhart Smith (who married George Martin in June 1966) and allude to the ancient Hebrew king David and prince Jonathan, whose close personal friendship was documented in the First Book of Samuel.

The duo sang the main title theme (composed by John Dankworth), for the eponymously titled 1966 spy-spoof film, Modesty Blaise. They also recorded a version of the Beatles' "She's Leaving Home", produced by George Martin, in 1967.

After David and Jonathan had run its course, the duo formed The Congregation and also continued to write successful hit singles, both individually and together, for such artists as Blue Mink, the Hollies, Engelbert Humperdinck, Whistling Jack Smith, Bobby Goldsboro and others.

== Discography ==
=== Singles ===
Year	Single	Chart Positions			
Year	Single	UK	US	AU	CAN
1965	"Laughing Fit to Cry"	-	-	-	-
1966	"Michelle"	11	18	42	1
1966	"Speak Her Name"	59 (Note: Chart position is from the official UK "Breakers List".)	109	-	-
1966	"Lovers of the World Unite"	7	-	42	-
1966	"Ten Storeys High"	-	-	-	-
1966	"Tu cambi idea"	-	-	-	-
1966	"Scarlet Ribbons (For Her Hair)"	-	-	92	-
1967	"The Magic Book"	-	-	-	-
1967	"She's Leaving Home"	-	123	93	-
1967	"Softly Whispering I Love You"	-	-	19	-
1968	"You Ought to Meet My Baby"	-	-	-	-

=== Albums ===
- David and Jonathan (UK) (1966)
- Michelle (USA) (1966)
- The Very Best of David and Jonathan (Germany) (1967)
- Lovers of the World Unite (1984)

== See also ==
- List of 1960s one-hit wonders in the United States
- RPM number-one hits of 1966
- List of bands from Bristol
- Culture of Bristol
