= Batman (military) =

Soldier or airman assigned to an officer as a personal servant

A batman or orderly is a soldier or airman assigned to a commissioned officer as a personal servant. Before the advent of motorized transport, an officer's batman was also in charge of the officer's "bat-horse" that carried the officer's kit during a campaign. This British English term is derived from the obsolete bat, meaning "pack saddle" (from French: bât, from Old French: bast, from Late Latin: bastum).

== Duties ==
A batman's duties could include:

- acting as a "runner" to convey orders from the officer to subordinates
- maintaining the officer's uniform and personal equipment as a valet
- driving the officer's vehicle, sometimes under combat conditions
- acting as the officer's bodyguard in combat
- digging the officer's foxhole in combat, giving the officer time to direct his unit
- other miscellaneous tasks the officer does not have time or inclination to do

The action of serving as a batman was called "batting". In armies where officers typically came from the upper class, it was not unusual for a former batman to follow the officer into later civilian life as a domestic servant.

== By country ==
=== France ===
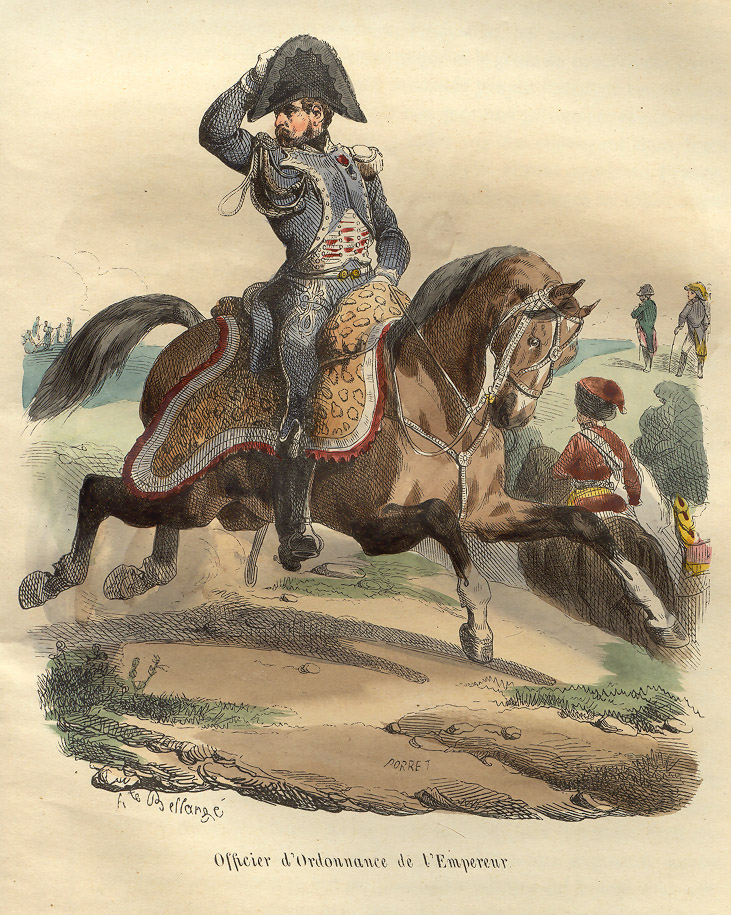
French aide-de-camp, Napoleonic Wars.

In the French Army the term for batman was ordonnance ("orderly"). Batmen were officially abolished after World War II. However, in the 1960s there were still batmen in the French Army.

=== Germany ===
In the German Army the batman was known as Ordonnanz ("orderly") from the French "ordonnance", or colloquially as Putzer ("cleaner") or as Bursche ("boy" or "valet").

The main character Švejk of the antimilitarist, satirical novel The Good Soldier Švejk by the Czech author Jaroslav Hašek is the most famous portrayal of a batman drafted into the Austro-Hungarian Army during the First World War. (The 1967 German song "Ich war der Putzer vom Kaiser" is actually based on the British instrumental hit "I Was Kaiser Bill's Batman" of the same year, with original German lyrics.)

=== India ===
The old British term "orderly" continued into the post-independence Indian Army. It has now, however, been replaced with the Hindi word sahayak, which translates as "assistant" or "helper". There have been suggestions to do away with the practice, as the Indian Navy and Indian Air Force already have.

=== Bangladesh ===
In the Bangladeshi Army, officers and officer cadets have civilian orderlies. In the Bangladeshi Air Force, they are called batmen.

=== Italy ===
In the Italian Army the term for batman was attendente, from the Italian verb attendere (same meaning of the English verb to attend). Attendenti were eventually abolished in 1971.

=== Nigeria ===
The term Orderly is in use for both the military and police assistants.

=== Pakistan ===
The term "batman" in the Pakistan Army dates from the period of the British Indian Army. In the modern Pakistan Army, civilian personnel are employed in this role and are designated as NCB (Non-Combatant Bearer) or (Non-Commissioned Batman). The term implies that the present-day batman is not a soldier or part of the fighting cadre of the army, and works only as a personal servant to each officer.

The employment of NCBs in the Pakistan Air Force and the Pakistan Navy is not officially recognized. However, both these services pay their officers an extra allowance comparable to the average pay of a household servant.

=== Russia and the Soviet Union ===
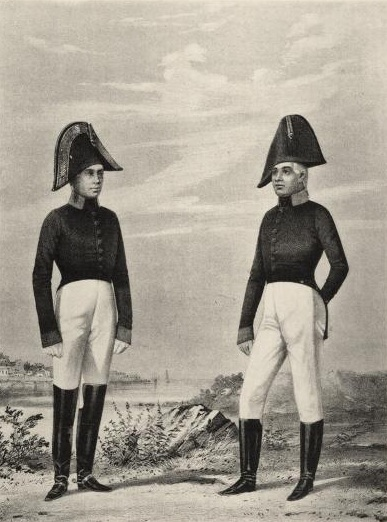
Batman (military) (1802–1812)

The Imperial Russian Army used the term denshchik (Russian: Денщик) for a batman. In the Russian Empire higher-ranking cavalry officers often chose Cossacks for these roles as they could be reasonably depended on to survive combat, and were also known for resourcefulness on campaign. However, they were hired help, and had to be provided with a horse also. The lower-ranking officers from serf-owning families brought a servant from home they were familiar with, particularly the infantry and artillery officers that did not require additional protection in combat, and tended to leave the servants with the unit baggage train. After the abolition of serfdom in the Russian Empire (1861), many officers went on campaign without servants.

Although the positions were abolished in the post-revolutionary Soviet Union, the recognition that higher-ranking officers required assistance soon fostered an unofficial reintroduction of the role through secondment of an NCO to the officer's staff, usually also as the driver, which also at one stage became their unofficial role and title as many officers often "lived" out of their vehicles. The term was borrowed from the French, but adopted to Russian pronunciation as ordinarets (Russian: Ординарец).

Several ordirnartsy of the marshals and generals commanding fronts and armies during the Second World War wrote memoirs about their service. For example, Zhukov's "driver" was a semi-professional racing car driver Aleksandr Nikolaevich Buchin who met Zhukov by accident on the first day of the war when Zhukov's previous elderly driver failed to get the vehicle he was in out of the rut. Buchin drove Zhukov throughout the war and although he began the war as a private, he ended the war with the rank of captain. Buchin wrote his memoirs called One hundred and seventy thousand kilometres with Zhukov, at the suggestion of the marshal in the 1970s.

=== Sweden ===
Kalfaktor, derived from calefactory and entering the Swedish language during the 17th century, was a soldier assigned to tend to an officer from the rank of platoon leader and higher. The duties was mainly focused on practicalities like maintaining the officer's personal equipment and uniform, make sure meals and sleeping quarters are prepared and so forth, but also to remind the officer to get rest when needed and to avoid unnecessary risks.

=== Turkey ===
The term "emir eri" (literally "order private") was used for a soldier that attends an officer. The practice was abolished in 1950.

=== United Kingdom ===
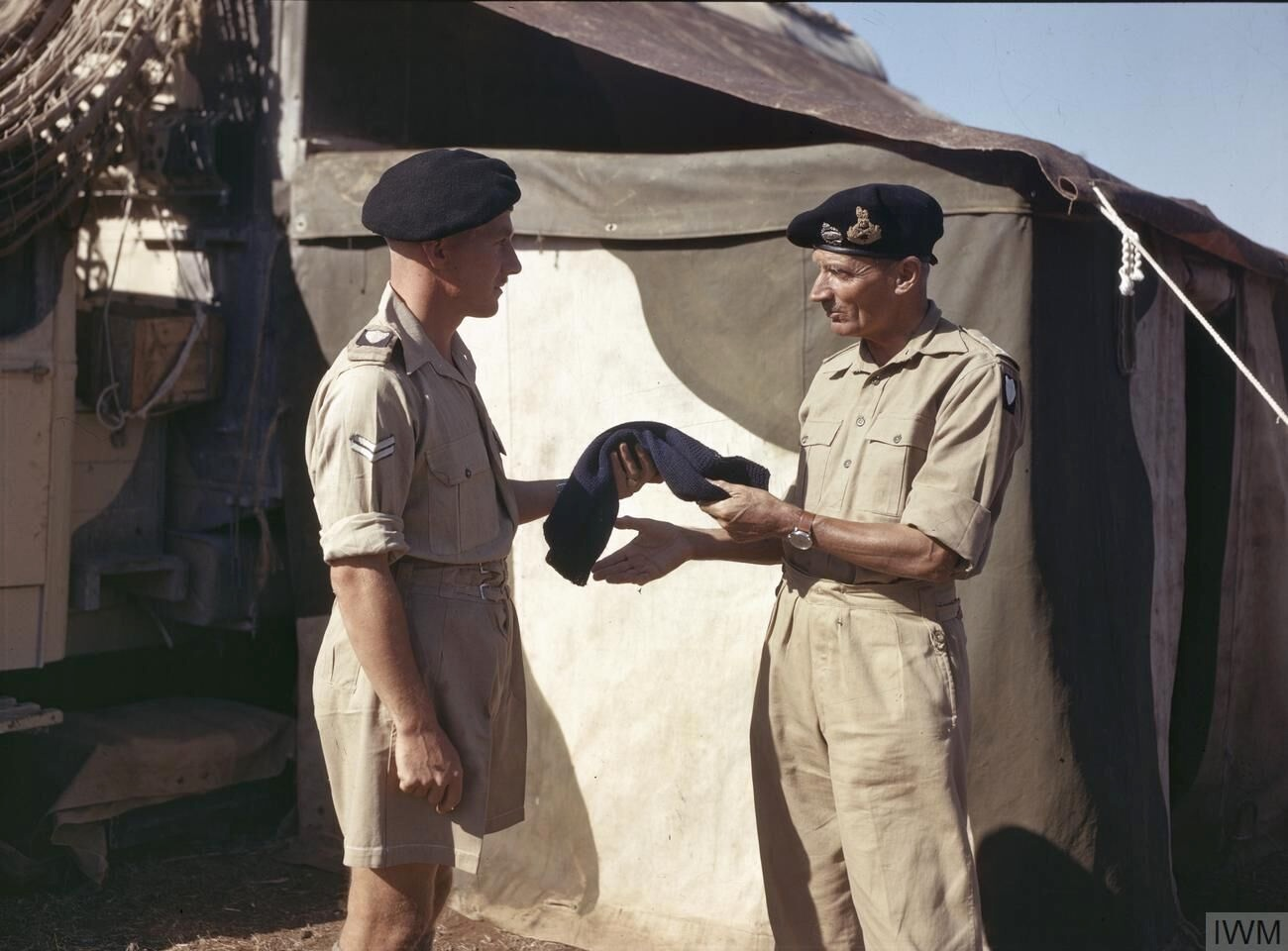
Field Marshal Bernard Montgomery with his batman, Corporal English, in 1943

The official term used by the British Army in the First World War was "soldier-servant". Every officer was assigned a servant, usually chosen by the officer from among his men. J. R. R. Tolkien's observations while in military service during World War I of the relationship between a batman and his officer informed how he wrote the relationship between the characters Samwise Gamgee and Frodo Baggins (introduced in The Fellowship of the Ring in 1954).

The term batman replaced this in the inter-war years. Batmen were among the casualties of the Great Depression, and by the Second World War only senior officers of the army and Royal Air Force were officially assigned batmen, with junior officers usually sharing the services of one batman among several officers. However, for infantry officers at the platoon and company levels, many of the batman's operational duties were still carried out by a designated runner taken from elsewhere in the formation, though without the prestige and privileges that the role previously held. Batwomen also served in the women's services.

Batman was usually seen as a desirable position. The soldier was exempted from more onerous duties and often got better rations and other favours from his officer. Senior officers' batmen usually received fast promotion to lance-corporal, with many becoming corporals and even sergeants. The position was generally phased out after the war. Officers of the Household Division, however, still have orderlies, because of the high proportion of ceremonial duties required of them.

In the Royal Navy, stewards performed many of the duties of batmen in the other services. Aboard ship, only captains and admirals were assigned personal stewards, with the other officers being served by a pool of officers' stewards. Most vessels carried at least two stewards, with larger vessels carrying considerably more.

The Royal Marines used the term Marine Officer's Attendant (MOA).

The term "orderly" was often used instead of "batman" in the colonial forces, especially in the British Indian Army. The orderly was frequently a civilian instead of a soldier. However, from 1903 to 1939 four Indian officers from different regiments were appointed each year to serve as "King's (or Queen's) Indian Orderly Officers" in attendance on the monarch in London. While performing some routine orderly functions the main role of these officers was to represent the Indian Army in full dress uniform at ceremonial functions in front of the British public who might otherwise seldom be made aware of its existence.

In the British Armed Forces, the term "batman" or "batwoman" was formerly also applied to a civilian who cleaned officers' messes or married quarters. In the Royal Air Force, free married quarters cleaning services were phased out for all officers except squadron leaders or above in command appointments as of 1 April 1972.

One famous example of officer and batman during the Second World War was British actor David Niven and fellow actor Peter Ustinov. Niven and Ustinov were working on the film The Way Ahead, as actor and writer, respectively, but the difference in their ranks—Niven was a Lieutenant-Colonel and Ustinov a private—made their association militarily impossible; to solve the problem, Ustinov was appointed as Niven's batman.

At the start of the Battle of Gazala in the Second World War, Major General Frank Messervy was captured by the Germans on 27 May 1942, but having removed all insignia, managed to bluff the Germans into believing he was a batman. As such, he was not closely guarded by his captors and managed to escape with other members of his staff to rejoin Division HQ the following day.

=== United States ===
Aides are junior commissioned officers who are available to support some of the needs of general officers who serve in command positions in the rank of brigadier general and above, and those of Flag Officers in the grade of Rear Admiral (lower half) and above in the Navy and Coast Guard. These aides "perform tasks and details that, if performed by general or flag officers, would be at the expense of the officer’s primary military and official duties." Their assistance, however, is restricted to those tasks which are directly related to the officer's official duties.

In addition to officers being assigned as aides de camp, all the US Services, including the US Coast Guard, also use enlisted personnel in support of General Officers and Flag Officers. This program is officially known as the Enlisted Aide Program. Generally the personnel are military cooks; however, in recent years, any enlisted person could volunteer to serve in this position. They attend a joint service course for Enlisted Aides and advanced culinary course for cooks. Many are often sent on to education outside the military to become chefs and butler training. Some will also be used as stewards and stewardess on very senior officer's aircraft. In addition General and Flag officers are assigned a driver. Drivers may get additional training but not always in driving, taking their service's or another service's driver course and or other government agency's driving schools. Only personnel in the Enlisted Aide Program can serve as an Enlisted Aide. Drivers, admin personnel and others on the personal staff are often but not always selected locally.

Ordinarily, enlisted service members would be prohibited from performing services as an aide. "No officer may use an enlisted member as a servant for duties that contribute only to the officer's personal benefit and that have no reasonable connection with the officer's official responsibilities, according to the Department of Defense instruction 1315.09 for Enlisted Aides.

In the United States Army the term "striker" or "dog robber" (a slang term implying that the soldier ate table scraps otherwise given to the officer's pet dog) was unofficially used, although that could also be applied to a junior officer who acted as a gofer to somebody with high rank.

== In popular culture ==
Perhaps one of the most famous fictional examples of a batman was Private Baldrick, portrayed by Tony Robinson, who served as batman to Captain Blackadder in Blackadder Goes Forth. Lord Peter Wimsey's valet Mervyn Bunter in Dorothy L. Sayers's detective novels had been Wimsey's batman in World War I and helped save his life.

The actor James Garner played such a role in the film The Americanization of Emily (1964).

In 1967, the pseudonymous Whistling Jack Smith (actually a session vocalist) recorded an all-whistling number called "I Was Kaiser Bill's Batman", which went Top 5 in the UK. The title indeed refers to a military batman, not to the superhero.

== See also ==
- Aide-de-camp (ADC)
- Adjutant
- Bagman
- Equerry
- Squire
- Valet
