= It only hurts when I laugh =

Punchline of a joke

"It only hurts when I laugh" is a punchline of a joke which exists in numerous versions since at least 19th century. A typical setup is that someone badly hurt is asked "Does it hurt?" — "I'm fine. It only hurts when I laugh."

The phrase has been used as a title of various works:

- It Only Hurts When I Laugh (album), by Jann Browne, 1991
- It Only Hurts When I Laugh, an autobiography by Stan Freberg
- Boli tylko, gdy się śmieję… ('It Only Hurts When I Laugh...') in the correspondence of Stanisław Lem
- It Only Hurts When I Laugh!, a caught-on-camera series that aired on truTV from 2009 to 2011

== See also ==
- Only When I Laugh (disambiguation)
- "It Only Hurts When I'm Laughing", a song by Mi-Sex
- It Only Hurts When I Cry
- It Only Hurts When I'm Breathing
