= Johnny Johnson and the Bandwagon =

American vocal soul group

- Also known as: The Bandwagon
- Origin: Rochester, New York, U.S.
- Genres: Soul
- Years active: 1967–mid 1970s
- Labels: Direction; Epic; Bell
- Past members: Johnny Johnson; Artie Fullilove; Billy Bradley; Terry Lewis

Johnny Johnson and the Bandwagon were an American vocal soul group, prominent in the late 1960s and early 1970s. They were fronted by singer Johnny Johnson. They are probably remembered most for the catchy hit, "(Blame It) On the Pony Express".

== Background ==
Johnson was born as John A. Mathis on July 20, 1942 in Belle Glade, Florida, the son of Lillie Kate Mathis who later married Lucine Johnson. As a child, he moved to Rochester, New York, and later sang in several local groups, including the Bandwagons [sic]. Other early members of the group included Terry Lewis (born in Baltimore, Ohio), Jerry Ferguson, and Wade Davis.

Ferguson and Davis left the group, and after being discovered by record producer Denny Randell of Epic Records, Johnson and Lewis were joined by fellow vocalists Arthur "Artie" Fullilove (b. New York City) and Billy Bradley (William Dillard Bradley, b. Rome, Alabama, October 16, 1941). In March 1968, in New York City, the group recorded "Breakin' Down the Walls of Heartache", a song written and produced by Randell and his regular partner Sandy Linzer. The record received some airplay in Philadelphia, but became more successful in Britain and Europe, where they toured. They had their first major UK hit in October 1968 with "Breakin' Down the Walls of Heartache", released on the Direction label, part of CBS, which reached number 4 on the UK Singles Chart. "Breakin' Down the Walls of Heartache" enjoyed a new lease of life in 1980, when covered by Dexys Midnight Runners on the b-side of "Geno", and as an album track in 1981 on a solo album by Bram Tchaikovsky, formerly of The Motors. It remained popular in UK soul clubs, during the early 1980s.

== Career ==
It was reported by the November 9 issue of Melody Maker while "Breaking Down the Walls of a Heartache" was at no. 17 in the Melody Maker Pop 30 chart that the group were to undertake a five week tour of Britain commencing at the end of the month. The members at the time were John Johnson, Arthur Fullilove, Terry Lewis and Billy Bradley.

In 1969 the original group disbanded, and all subsequent releases were billed as Johnny Johnson and His Bandwagon. In effect, the act was basically Johnson plus additional vocalists, who were hired for recording, touring and TV performances. Because they had been so much more successful in Britain and Europe, they based themselves in London, with songwriter Tony Macaulay being primarily responsible for the next stage of their career. They had top ten hits with "Sweet Inspiration" (1970), and "(Blame It) On the Pony Express" (1970). The latter track was written by Macaulay, Roger Cook and Roger Greenaway.

Their recording career continued through the 1970s, with a 1971 LP Soul Survivor, produced by Macaulay, as well as subsequent, less successful singles that year including "Sally Put Your Red Shoes On" and a cover version of the Bob Dylan song, "Mr Tambourine Man", on the Bell label. They left Bell, for further singles including "Honey Bee" (1972), on Stateside Records, and "Music to My Heart" (1975), a cover of the Patti Austin 1960's ABC Records single, on Epic Records, produced by Biddu. This was also reissued as the B-side to the 1975 reissue of "Breakin' Down The Walls Of Heartache", also on Epic.

Their commercial success in the UK waned, as their style became predictable and less fashionable. However, their early hits continued to be appreciated as Northern soul classics, as they espoused a more commercial pop-soul style similar in sound to that of early Tamla Motown, as opposed to the more funky progressive style favoured by contemporaries like Sly & the Family Stone and The Isley Brothers.

Johnson had not been well for several years, and diminishing commercial success and the pressures of touring during the early 1970s took a heavy toll. He retired from the music industry, and later worked in various jobs, including as a school bus driver. Johnson died in Rochester, New York on March 2, 2023, at the age of 80.

Group member William Bradley became a community worker and minister active in the International Missionary Outreach Society of New York. He published a memoir, Look Where He Brought Me From: From Darkness to Light, in 2011.

== Discography ==
=== Albums ===
- Bandwagon: Johnny Johnson and the Bandwagon (Direction 8-63500, 1968)
  - "When Love Has Gone Away"; "Stoned Soul Picnic"; "Breakin’ Down The Walls Of Heartache"; "I Wish It Would Rain"; "You Blew Your Cool & Lost Your Fool"; "You"; "People Got To Be Free"; "Girl From Harlem"; "Are You Ready For This"; "I Ain't Lyin’"; "Don't Let It In"; "Baby Make Your Own Sweet Music"
- Johnny Johnson and His Bandwagon: Soul Survivor (Bell SBLL 1138, 1971)
  - "(Blame It) On The Pony Express"; "Love is Blue (L'amour Est Bleu)"; "Gasoline Alley Bred"; "He Ain't Heavy, He's My Brother"; "Sweet Inspiration"; "In The Bad Old Days (Before You Loved Me)"; "United We Stand"; "Games People Play"; "Something"; "Pride Comes Before A Fall"; "Never Let Her Go"
- Johnny Johnson and His Bandwagon: Breakin’ Down The Walls Of Heartache (Ace CDKEND 307, 2008) - compilation
  - "Breakin' Down The Walls Of Heartache"; "When Love Has Gone Away"; "Let's Hang On"; "Stoned Soul Picnic"; " I Ain't Lyin'"; "Baby Make Your Own Sweet Music"; "On The Day We Fall In Love"; "Dancin' Master"; " I Wish It Would Rain"; "You Blew Your Cool And Lost Your Fool"; "Are You Ready For This"; "People Got To Be Free"; "Don't Let It In"; "You"; "Girl From Harlem"; "Sweet Inspiration"; "In The Bad Bad Old Days (Before You Loved Me)"; "United We Stand"; "Sally Out Your Red Shoes On"; "Mr. Tambourine Man"; "(Blame It) On The Pony Express"; "Gasoline Alley Bred"; "High And Dry"; "Music To My Heart"

=== Singles ===
Title	Year	Peak chart positions							
Title	Year	US	US R&B	AUS	GER	IRE	NZ	SWE	UK
"Baby Make Your Own Sweet Music" b/w "On the Day We Fall in Love"	1967	—	48	—	—	—	—	—	—
"Breakin' Down the Walls of Heartache" b/w "Dancin' Master"	1968	115	—	—	—	5	—	—	4
"You" b/w "You Blew Your Cool and Lost Your Fool"	1968	—	—	—	—	—	—	—	34
"Let's Hang On" b/w "I Ain't Lyin'"	1969	—	—	—	—	—	—	—	36
"Sweet Inspiration" b/w "Pride Comes Before a Fall"	1970	—	—	—	—	19	—	—	10
"(Blame It) On the Pony Express" b/w "Never Let Her Go"	1970	—	—	17	18	5	10	8	7
"Mr. Tambourine Man" b/w "Soul Sahara"	1971	—	—	—	—	—	—	—	51 (Note: Chart position is from the UK "Breakers List".)
"Sally Put Your Red Shoes On" b/w "Gasoline Alley Bred"	1971	—	—	—	—	—	—	—	—
"High and Dry" b/w "Never Set Me Free"	1972	—	—	—	—	—	—	—	—
"Honey Bee" b/w "I Don't Know Why"	1972	—	—	—	—	—	—	—	—
"Give Me Your Love Again" b/w "All the Way"	1973	—	—	—	—	—	—	—	—
"Strong Love Proud Love" b/w "Fast Running out of World"	1974	—	—	—	—	—	—	—	—
"Breakin' Down the Walls of Heartache" (re-release) b/w "Dancin' Master"	1974	—	—	—	—	—	—	—	56
"Music to My Heart" b/w "Lookin' Lean Feelin' Mean"	1975	—	—	—	—	—	—	—	—
"—" denotes releases that did not chart or were not released in that territory.

== See also ==
- List of performers on Top of the Pops
