= (Blame It) On the Pony Express =

1970 single by Johnny Johnson and the Bandwagon

Single by Johnny Johnson and the Bandwagon

from the album Soul Survivor
- B-side: "Never Let Her Go"
- Released: 30 October 1970
- Genre: Soul
- Length: 3:04
- Label: Bell
- Songwriter(s): Tony Macaulay; Roger Greenaway; Roger Cook
- Producer(s): Tony Macaulay

Johnny Johnson and the Bandwagon singles chronology
"Sweet Inspiration" (1970)	"(Blame It) On the Pony Express" (1970)	"Mr. Tambourine Man" (1971)

"(Blame It) On the Pony Express" is a song by American soul group Johnny Johnson and the Bandwagon released as a single in October 1970. It peaked at number seven on the UK Singles Chart, becoming their third and final top-ten hit there.

== Background ==
"(Blame It) On the Pony Express" was written by Tony Macaulay, Roger Greenaway and Roger Cook, and was originally intended to be released by Edison Lighthouse as their second single following their worldwide hit "Love Grows (Where My Rosemary Goes)". The band recorded the backing track and a rough vocal track; however, Macauley, who was their manager and producer, was apparently not that impressed with the vocals, later saying the song "required a more gutsy voice than any of them had". Macaulay decided to pass the song over to Edison Lighthouse's labelmates Johnny Johnson and the Bandwagon for whom he had produced their previous single "Sweet Inspiration".

John Abbey reviewing in Blues & Soul wrote that compared to "Sweet Inspiration", "(Blame It) On the Pony Express" "permits Johnny far more scope as a vocalist" and that "it's far more leaning towards R&B than its predecessor and less of the old singalong sound".

== Charts ==
Chart (1971)	Peak position
Australia (Go-Set)	13
Australia (Kent Music Report)	17
Germany (GfK)	18
Ireland (IRMA)	5
New Zealand (Listener)	10
Sweden (Kvällstoppen)	8
UK Singles (OCC)	7
