= Sweet Inspiration (Johnny Johnson and the Bandwagon song) =

1970 single by Johnny Johnson and the Bandwagon

Single by Johnny Johnson and the Bandwagon

from the album Soul Survivor
- B-side: "Pride Comes Before a Fall"
- Released: 29 May 1970
- Genre: Soul
- Length: 3:05
- Label: Bell
- Songwriter(s): John Cameron
- Producer(s): Tony Macaulay

Johnny Johnson and the Bandwagon singles chronology
"Let's Hang On" (1969)	"Sweet Inspiration" (1970)	"(Blame It) On the Pony Express" (1970)

"Sweet Inspiration" is a song by the American soul group Johnny Johnson and the Bandwagon, the first single from their second album Soul Survivor, released in May 1970. It peaked at number 10 on the UK Singles Chart, becoming their second top-ten hit there.

== Release ==
Due to the group's lack of success in the US compared to the UK (where "Breakin' Down the Walls of Heartache" was a top 5 hit), the group had moved to the UK, and "Sweet Inspiration" was released there first before its release in the US in July. The B-side, "Pride Comes Before a Fall", was written by Jacky Arthur and Mel Kent.

== Track listing ==
7"

1. "Sweet Inspiration" – 3:05
2. "Pride Comes Before a Fool" – 2:40

== Charts ==
Chart (1970)	Peak position
Ireland (IRMA)	19
Singapore (Rediffusion)	2
UK Singles (OCC)	10

== Cover versions ==
- In July 1970, Cilla Black released a version of the song on her album Sweet Inspiration.
- A version by Dusty Springfield was recorded in June 1970 but was not released at the time. It has since been released on various compilation albums.
