= You've Got Your Troubles =

Single by the Fortunes

from the album The Fortunes
- B-side: "I've Got to Go"
- Released: August 1965
- Genre: Pop
- Length: 3:23
- Label: Decca Records F12173 (UK); Press 9773 (US)
- Songwriters: Roger Greenaway, Roger Cook
- Producer: Noel Walker

The Fortunes singles chronology
"Look Homeward Angel" (1964)	"You've Got Your Troubles" (1965)	"Here It Comes Again" (1965)

"You've Got Your Troubles" was the inaugural composition by the prolific songwriting team of Roger Cook and Roger Greenaway in 1964. "You've Got Your Troubles" became a number 2 UK hit for the Fortunes in the United Kingdom in August 1965, affording the group international success including a Top Ten ranking in the US. The track was included on the Fortunes' self-titled 1965 debut album release, the group's only album release of the 1960s.

== History ==
Cook and Greenaway wrote "You've Got Your Troubles" while they were both members of the group the Kestrels, the song being composed while that group was on a pop package tour. Cook recalls he and Greenaway were in a theatre. "Roger [Greenaway] said 'I've [written] a little tune' and we both brought our ukuleles out and he played [his tune] and he said 'Could you help me with the lyric?' and in the space of two hours we'd written the whole song".

Cook and Greenaway cut a demo to pitch the song which was accepted by Mills Music Publishing, where the two were signed as staff writers by Tony Hiller. Hiller, who had written "Caroline" the second of four previous non-charting singles by The Fortunes, placed "You've Got Your Troubles" with that group. Noel Walker, an in-house producer for Decca Records, recalled: "The Fortunes' contract came up for renewal and Decca didn't want to renew it ... I told Decca that they sung wonderfully and deserved another chance. I wanted to use them as singers backed by professional musicians [the Fortunes would receive some adverse publicity for not playing on the track themselves] and I found a beautiful song 'You've Got Your Troubles'." Les Reed, who arranged the session for the Fortunes' recording, conceived the track's striking trumpet motif. (Reed believes that on their demo Cook and Greenaway vocalised the notes which Reed would have played on the trumpet.) This song is noted for the counterpoint melody heard towards the end of the song.

Radio Caroline North DJ Mike Ahern would claim that his radio station was responsible for the breakout of "You've Got Your Troubles", which reached number 2 on the UK chart dated 25 August 1965, held off from number 1 by The Beatles' "Help!", then in the final week of its three-week tenure at number 1 UK. In the US, "You've Got Your Troubles" peaked at number 7 on the 2 October 1965 Hot 100. The song reached number 1 in Canada and New Zealand, number 3 in Ireland, and was especially successful in the Netherlands, spending 14 weeks in the Top Ten, peaking at number 3. Other international hit parade rankings were achieved in Australia (number 12), Belgium (French number 24 / Flemish number 10), Germany (number 28), and South Africa (number 6).

The demo of "You've Got Your Troubles" by Cook and Greenaway also came to the attention of George Martin who wanted to have the songwriters record their own song, but due to his time being taken up producing The Beatles' album Rubber Soul (1965), Martin was unable to produce Cook and Greenaway's recording of "You've Got Your Troubles" prior to The Fortunes' version hitting the charts. Martin did have Cook and Greenaway cover the Rubber Soul track "Michelle" which afforded the duo a Top 20 hit in both US and the UK, and number 1 in Canada, being billed as David and Jonathan (Cook and Greenaway had had a previous non-charting single release: their composition "Laughing Fit to Cry", which was not produced by Martin). "You've Got Your Troubles" was featured on the 1966 David and Jonathan album which was self-titled in the UK and titled Michelle for US release.

The Fortunes would remake "You've Got Your Troubles" for the group's album Their Golden Hits recorded in the summer of 1982 in Amsterdam, the Netherlands, for domestic release by Phonogram-Holland.

== Chart history ==
=== Weekly charts ===
Chart (1965)	Peak position
Australia	12
Canada RPM Top Singles	1
Ireland (IRMA)	3
Netherlands (Hit Dossier 1939-1998)	3
New Zealand (Listener)	1
South Africa (Springbok Radio)	6
UK	2
U.S. Billboard Hot 100	7
U.S. Cash Box Top 100	7

=== Year-end charts ===
Chart (1965)	Rank
U.S. Billboard Hot 100	84
U.S. Cash Box	87

== Notable cover versions ==
- "You've Got Your Troubles" became a chart single in 1966 for Nancy Wilson. Taken from her Touch of Today album, Wilson's version reached number 48 R&B in Billboard and number 10 on the magazine's A/C chart.
- David and Jonathan (featuring the song's writers Roger Greenaway and Roger Cook) on album David and Jonathan in the UK and entitled Michelle for US release (1966)
- As "You've Got Your Troubles (I've Got Mine)" the song became a Country & Western hit for Jack Blanchard & Misty Morgan whose version – taken from their 1969 album Birds of a Feather – reached number 27 on the Billboard Hot Country Singles, and number 11 in Canada.
- Roger Cook and Roger Greenaway produced the recording of their composition "You've Got Your Troubles" recorded by the session group White Plains which version was featured on their 1970 debut album self-titled in the UK and released in the US as My Baby Loves Lovin'.
- Cook and Greenaway also produced a remake of "You've Got Your Troubles" by the Drifters which was issued as a single off of the group's 1973 album The Drifters Now.
- Neil Diamond covered the song on his 1978 LP You Don't Bring Me Flowers.
