= Blue Mink =

British six-piece pop group

- Origin: United Kingdom
- Genres: R&B, pop, rock
- Years active: 1969–1977
- Labels: Philips, Regal Zonophone, EMI, Target Records
- Past members: Roger Coulam; Madeline Bell; Roger Cook; Alan Parker; Herbie Flowers; Ann Odell; Barry Morgan; Ray Cooper; Mike Moran

Blue Mink were a British six-piece pop group that existed from 1969 to 1977. Over that period they had six top 20 hit singles on the UK Singles Chart, and released five studio based albums. According to AllMusic: "they have been immortalised on a string of compilation albums, each recounting the string of effervescent hits that established them among Britain's best-loved pop groups of the early 1970s."

== Career ==
Roger Coulam (keyboards) formed the band in the autumn of 1969, with American-born Madeline Bell (vocalist), Roger Cook (vocalist), Alan Parker (guitarist), Herbie Flowers (bassist), and Barry Morgan (drummer). Most of the songs were written by Cook and Roger Greenaway. Flowers, Morgan and Parker all worked with Coulam at London's Morgan Studios. The four of them recorded several backing tracks, with which Coulam approached Bell and Greenaway, (who had been half of David and Jonathan), as vocalists. Greenaway declined, but put forward Cook (the other half of David and Jonathan).

Rabbis and the Friars
Bishops and the Gurus
You got the Beatles or the Sun God (- it's true)
Well, it really doesn't matter
What religion you choose
No, no, no, – ooh

Mick and Lady Faithfull
Lord and Mrs Graceful
You know the living could be tasteful
Oh, we should all get together in a lovin' machine
I'd better call up the Queen
It's only fair that she knows
You know, you know

— from "Melting Pot", Roger Cook and Roger Greenaway.

The band's debut single "Melting Pot", written by Cook and Greenaway, was recorded with this line-up and released on 31 October 1969 on the Philips label (catalogue BF1818), with the B-side "Blue Mink" (penned by Alan Parker); it peaked at No. 3 in the UK Singles Chart. An American cover version entitled "People Are Together" by soul singer Mickey Murray proved too radical for American radio and failed to get any meaningful airplay. An album of the same name was released early in 1970, at the same time as the second single, "Good Morning Freedom", which reached No. 10 in the chart. The track did not feature on the first release of the LP, but was added to subsequent pressings.

The members continued with their session work despite the success of the band. In March 1970, Cook, Bell, Parker and Morgan appeared on Elton John's eponymous second solo album; Elton John covered "Good Morning Freedom" (written by Albert Hammond) anonymously on the Deacon Records budget compilation album Pick of the Pops. In April, Cook and Greenaway played briefly in Currant Kraze, and together they continued to write songs such as "You've Got Your Troubles", "I've Got You on My Mind" and "I'd Like to Teach the World to Sing". Other side projects included: involvement with Parker's band The Congregation; Herbie Flowers' contributions to Lou Reed's Transformer album; and the involvement of Flowers, Morgan and Parker in sessions with Pete Atkin in March 1971, that later appeared on his Driving Through Mythical America album.

The band's second album and their third single released on Philips in September 1970 were entitled Our World (the album was released as Real Mink in the US). The band's next single release was "The Banner Man" on Regal Zonophone in the spring of 1971. It reached No. 3 in the UK chart, equalling the success of the debut single and notable for its use of a brass band. Reviewing Real Mink years later in Christgau's Record Guide: Rock Albums of the Seventies (1981), Robert Christgau said Bell and Cook's collaboration is "solid white soul, marred by a couple of automatic instrumentals but graced by a charming self-consciousness as well as a few top commercial songs—oh yes, and a black singer."

The members' other projects now took priority until January 1972 when Blue Mink played two weeks at The Talk of the Town nightclub in London. Recordings from this engagement were released that March as the album Live at the Talk of the Town simultaneously with the studio album A Time of Change (renamed from Harvest to avoid confusion with Neil Young's new LP).

Ray Cooper (drums) and Ann Odell (keyboards) joined the band that summer and played on the single "Stay With Me" co-written by Herbie Flowers, which charted at No. 11 in November 1972. By the time of Blue Mink's fourth album, Only When I Laugh, glam rock was supplanting the lighter pop sound of the previous few years. The associated single, "By The Devil (I Was Tempted)", written by Guy Fletcher and Doug Flett, only reached No. 26 and the Top 10 single "Randy" in June 1973 was their last success. Their final album, Fruity, (January 1974) and the singles "Quackers" (January 1974) and "Get Up" (July 1974) failed, and the band split up that autumn after a farewell tour of the United States. Elton John was among the celebrities present to say goodbye, introducing the band onstage at The Troubadour in Los Angeles.

=== Reunions ===
The band reformed in 1976 featuring Mike Moran. They recorded a few singles on the Target Records label that was owned by Cook and Greenaway. The best known of their three releases was "Where Were You Today", written by Greenaway and Dundas, previously "Come and C&A", a television and radio commercial jingle theme for the department store C&A. When Capital Radio, one of the UK's first two independent local radio stations took to the air in London in 1973, the station's identity jingles were written by Cook and Greenaway, performed by Blue Mink and orchestrated by George Martin. Madeline Bell had also sung the original jingles for Radio Caroline, the offshore pirate station that first went on-air in 1964, in the end successfully challenging the BBC's monopoly of British radio broadcasting.

After the band's demise, each of the members maintained a presence in the world of session musicianship and songwriting. In 1975, the Rimshots and the Gary Toms Empire covered Blue Mink's "Get Up", retitled as the disco single "7-6-5-4-3-2-1 (Blow Your Whistle)," and the latter scored a #5 Billboard R&B hit (#46 Hot 100). In 1994, Cook, Bell and Flowers were re-united for a television rendition of their hit "Melting Pot" on the Michael Barrymore show.

== Discography ==
=== Albums ===
- Melting Pot (1969)
- Our World (1970)
- Real Mink (US album)
- A Time of Change (1972)
- Live at the Talk of the Town (1972)
- Only When I Laugh (1973)
- The Best of Blue Mink (1973, compilation)
- Fruity (1974, produced by Mackay)
- Attention (1975, compilation)
- Collection: Blue Mink (1978, compilation)
- Good Morning Freedom: The Anthology (2002, compilation)

Note: The UK and US Melting Pot albums contained different track listings.

=== Singles ===
Title	Year	Peak chart positions												Album
Title	Year	UK	AUS	BE (FLA)	BE (WA)	CAN	GER	IRE	NL	NOR	NZ	SA	US	Album
"Blue Mink"	1969	—	—	—	—	—	—	—	—	—	—	—	—	Non-album single
"Melting Pot"	1969	3	10	—	—	79	—	8	7	4	2	—	—	Melting Pot
"Good Morning Freedom"	1970	10	33	4	37	100	31	3	6	—	13	—	—	Melting Pot
"Can You Feel It, Baby?" (US-only release)	1970	—	—	—	—	—	—	—	—	—	—	—	—	Melting Pot
"Our World"	1970	17	99	30	—	62	—	19	10	—	—	—	64	Our World
"Time for Winning"	1971	—	—	—	—	—	—	—	—	—	—	—	—	The Raging Moon soundtrack
"We Have All Been Saved" (Europe-only release)	1971	—	—	—	—	—	—	—	—	—	—	—	—	Our World
"The Banner Man"	1971	3	4	19	—	—	38	3	9	—	2	3	—	Non-album single
"Sunday"	1971	—	—	—	—	—	—	—	—	—	—	—	—	A Time of Change
"Count Me In"	1972	—	—	—	—	—	—	—	—	—	—	—	—	A Time of Change
"Wacky, Wacky, Wacky"	1972	—	—	—	—	—	—	—	—	—	—	—	—	Non-album single
"Stay with Me"	1972	11	—	—	—	—	—	14	—	—	—	—	—	Only When I Laugh
"By the Devil (I Was Tempted)"	1973	26	—	—	—	—	—	—	—	—	3	—	—	Only When I Laugh
"Randy"	1973	9	73	—	—	—	—	15	—	—	—	—	—	Only When I Laugh
"Quackers"	1974	—	—	—	—	—	—	—	—	—	—	—	—	Fruity
"Get Up"	1974	—	—	—	—	—	—	—	—	—	—	—	—	The Best of Blue Mink
"Another 'Without You' Day"	1974	—	—	—	—	—	—	—	—	—	—	—	—	Only When I Laugh
"You're the One"	1976	—	—	—	—	—	—	—	—	—	—	—	—	Non-album singles
"Five Minute Wonder"	1977	—	—	—	—	—	—	—	—	—	—	—	—	Non-album singles
"Where Were You Today"	1977	—	—	—	—	—	—	—	—	—	—	—	—	Non-album singles
"—" denotes releases that did not chart or were not released in that territory.

== See also ==
- List of performers on Top of the Pops
- List of EMI artists
- CCS
- Category:Blue Mink members

== Other sources ==
- The Guinness Who's Who of Seventies Music, (London: Guinness) ISBN 0-85112-727-4
