= Correspondence of Stanisław Lem =

Selected correspondence of Stanisław Lem has been published in several books.

- 2021: Lem w PRL-u, selection of Lem's letters from 1951 to 1990, prepared and commented by Wojciech Orliński.
- 2018: Boli tylko, gdy się śmieję... Listy i rozmowy (It Only Hurts When I Laugh... Letters and Conversations) is a selected correspondence between Stanisław Lem, the poet Ewa Lipska, and Lem's son, Tomasz Lem, as well as records of conversations between Lem and Lipska in early 2000s.
- 2013: Sława i Fortuna, ISBN 978-83-0804934-1, 736pp, is a selection of Stanisław Lem's letters to his translator Michael Kandel during 1972–1987. It includes introduction by Jerzy Jarzębski and comments by Maciej Urbanowski.
- 2011: Stanisław Lem, Sławomir Mrożek, Listy (Letters), ISBN 978-83-08-04730-9, is a selection of correspondence between Lem and Mrożek from 1956 to 1978.
- 2002: Listy albo opór materii (Letters or Resistance of Matter) is a collection of letters written by Stanisław Lem from 1955 to 1988. The selection was carried out by Jerzy Jarzębski, who also wrote the afterword. The book includes brief biographical notes about the addressees and an index of names. The collection contains the author's correspondence with various institutions of the Polish People's Republic and letters written to friends, including: Helena Eilstein, Antoni Słonimski, Wiktor Woroszylski, Jerzy Jarzębski, Daniel Mróz, Szymon Kobyliński, Michael Kandel, and biophysicist prof. Władysław Kapuściński
- 2024: I mów, że moja chwała z przyjaciół się bierze (literally "And say that my glory comes from my friends"), a selection of the 1972-1984 correspondence between Lem and Ursula K. Le Guin, translated from English by Lems's son Tomasz Lem. The title comes from the line "And say my glory was I had such friends" by William Butler Yeats from his poem "The Municipal Gallery Revisited".
