= The Kestrels =

English vocal harmony quartet (1955–1965)

- Also known as: The Beltones, The Hi-Fi's
- Origin: Bristol, England
- Genres: Vocal harmony quartet
- Years active: 1955–1965
- Labels: Pye, Decca, Piccadilly
- Past members: Tony Burrows; Roger Maggs; Roger Greenaway; Geoff Williams; Pete Gullane; Roger Cook

The Kestrels were a vocal harmony quartet from Bristol, England, most notable as the group through which the songwriting team of Roger Cook and Roger Greenaway first met and started composing jointly. In addition, they are one of the first groups to feature Tony Burrows who later performed lead vocals on a string of hit songs for other bands in the late 1960s and early 1970s, several of which were written by Cook and Greenaway. They were one of the busiest vocal groups in England during the late 1950s and early 1960s, singing back-up behind Joe Brown, Billy Fury, Eden Kane, and Benny Hill, amongst others, and made dozens of television appearances between 1958 and 1964.

== Career ==
The quartet's origins were in the mid-1950s, when they were in their early teens at school together. Tony Burrows, Roger Greenaway, and Roger Maggs' earliest influences were skiffle and rock and roll, and they began getting booked to play local dances. The trio expanded to a quartet with the addition to Geoff Williams, who extended their harmonies upward into the falsetto range. They quickly started to focus on singing and became established as a harmony vocal group. Their main influences were American rhythm and blues harmony groups such as The Platters and The Penguins, whom they did their best to emulate vocally.

The group members went through the Army at the same time, continuing to work together whenever possible, and it was during this period that they got their name. They initially started working together as the Beltones and the Hi-Fi's, but their manager, taking his lead from the manufacturer of the pencil he had in his hand at the time, decreed that they should become The Kestrels. It also fit in with an American tradition of harmony vocal groups that were named after birds (the Crows, the Penguins etc.).

The Kestrels' debut single for Pye Records, "In The Chapel In The Moonlight," originally released as the B-side of their cover of Jack Scott's "There Comes A Time," came close to charting in late 1959.

The group bounced briefly over to Decca before returning to Pye Records, and a long-term contract to record for that label's Piccadilly imprint. Their subsequent releases failed to chart, but they remained busy on their own performances and also backing Pye's resident star, Lonnie Donegan, on some of his records (including the 1962 gospel album Sing Hallelujah) and his live performances. The Kestrels finished their military service early in 1960, and were able to resume their music work full-time. They carried on, trying several different approaches to choosing their songs, but mostly covering American hits.

In 1962, Maggs became the first original member to leave the group, opting to pursue a more steady work-life to support his growing family. He was replaced by Pete Gullane. However, Gullane left in 1964, with Roger Cook becoming his replacement.

In 1998, Sequel Records brought out a double album pairing thirty songs by The Kestrels, with thirty songs from fellow Bristolian group The Eagles.

They had a reunion in 1997, and over the subsequent years have raised substantial funds for charity. In 2009, all four original members of the group reconvened to record a charity CD (produced by Greenaway) entitled The Kestrels, Still Flying After 50 Years.

Geoff Williams, one of the original quartet, suffered a heart attack and died on 20 August 2010 aged 71, whilst on holiday in Crete.

== Discography ==
=== Albums ===
Year	Month	Label	Title	Tracks
1963	May	Piccadilly	Smash Hits From The Kestrels	A-side: 1. "Walk Right In"; 2. "Sherry"; 3. "Speedy Gonzales"; 4. "Will You Love Me Tomorrow"; 5. "Michael Row The Boat Ashore"; 6. "Don't Wanna Cry"; B-side: 1. "Rhythm Of The Rain"; 2. "Please, Please Me"; 3. "Island Of Dreams"; 4. "Walk Like A Man"; 5. "When I Fall In Love"; 6. "Lazy River"

=== EP ===
Year	Label	Title	Tracks
1958	Donegall	The Kestrels	A-side: 1. "Be My Girl"; 2. "We Were Young"; B-side: 1. "I Like Your Kind Of Love"; 2. Down By The Riverside"

=== Singles ===
Year	Month	Label	A-side	B-side	Notes
1959	November	Pye Nixa	"There Comes A Time"	"In The Chapel In The Moonlight"	
1960	February	Pye	"I Can't Say Goodbye"	"We Were Wrong"	
1961	March 3	Decca	"Sound Off (Duckworth's Chant)"	"Can't Say That I Do"	Released as "The Four Kestrels"
1961	September 22	Decca	"All These Things"	"That's It"	
1962	June 28	Piccadilly	"Wolverton Mountain"	"Little Sacka Sugar"	
1962	October	Piccadilly	"Don't Want To Cry"	"Love Me With All Your Heart (Quando Calienta El Sol)"	
1963	January	Piccadilly	"Walk Right In"	"Moving Up The King's Highway"	
1963	May	Piccadilly	"There's A Place"	"Little Star"	
1963	September 10	Piccadilly	"Love Me With All Your Heart (Quando Calienta El Sol)"	"Lazy River"	
1963	October	Pye	"500 Miles Away From Home"	"This Train"	Released as "Lonnie Donegan And His Group" (B-side has "The Kestrels" at the end)
1963	December	Piccadilly	"Dance With Me"	"I Want You"	

== See also ==
- List of bands from Bristol
- Culture of Bristol
