= Softly Whispering I Love You =

1967 single by David and Jonathan

Single by David and Jonathan
- B-side: "Such a Peaceful Day"
- Released: November 1967
- Genre: Pop
- Length: 3:11
- Label: Columbia
- Songwriters: Roger Greenaway and Roger Cook

David and Jonathan singles chronology
"She's Leaving Home" (1967)	"Softly Whispering I Love You" (1967)	"You Ought to Meet My Baby" (1968)

"Softly Whispering I Love You"

Single by the English Congregation
- B-side: "When Susie Takes the Plane"
- Released: October 15, 1971 (UK); December 1971 (US)
- Recorded: 1971
- Genre: Pop
- Length: 2:58
- Label: Columbia (UK); Atco (US)
- Songwriters: Roger Greenaway and Roger Cook

The English Congregation singles chronology
"Softly Whispering I Love You" (1971)	"Lovers of the World Unite" (1972)

"Softly Whispering I Love You" is a song written by Roger Greenaway and Roger Cook originally recorded by the duo under the name of David and Jonathan. This version peaked at No. 23 in Australia on Go-Set's National Top 40 Singles Chart.

== The Congregation version ==
- It was covered in 1971 by the Congregation, where the group's version was a worldwide hit. Their version peaked at No. 4 on the UK Singles Chart, 1 in South Africa and New Zealand, No. 10 in Germany and No. 11 in Australia's Go-Set's Singles Chart. In North America, the group was known as The English Congregation, where the song went to #29 on the Billboard Hot 100 and #21 in Canada.

== Paul Young version ==
English singer Paul Young recorded the song for his Other Voices album, and it was released as the first single from the album on 30 April 1990. It reached No. 21 on the UK Singles Chart and No. 16 in Ireland.

=== Charts ===
Chart (1990)	Peak position
Australia (ARIA)	102
Belgium (Ultratop 50 Flanders)	40
Europe (Eurochart Hot 100)	50
Ireland (IRMA)	16
Italy Airplay (Music & Media)	11
Netherlands (Single Top 100)	44
UK Singles (Official Charts)	21
