= John O'Neill (musician, born 1926) =

Singer and whistler from England

- Also known as: Whistling Jack Smith
- Born: 1926; Stanley, County Durham, England
- Died: 1999 (aged 72–73)

John O'Neill (1926–1999) was a British musician, known as a singer, whistler, and trumpeter.

== Biography ==
Born in Stanley, County Durham, England, to Northern Irish parents from County Tyrone, Northern Ireland, O'Neill was largely self-taught as a musician, and learned to sight-read music scores.

O'Neill had a UK top five hit single with "I Was Kaiser Bill's Batman" credited as 'Whistling Jack Smith' (a play on "Whispering" Jack Smith). He recorded this as the solo whistler for a set fee and was never acknowledged as its performer, nor paid any royalties. When the track was aired on Top of the Pops, O'Neill and his family were shocked to see an actor appear on stage to mime to the recorded backing track. Some sources attribute the single to British Decca/Deram producer Noel Walker, as producer and performing artist although the b-side of the single "The British Grin and Bear" is co-attributed to Walker.

O'Neill was a member of The Michael Sammes Singers in the United Kingdom. Mike Sammes' group were a vocal group, known primarily for their work as session singers providing backing vocals, although the group also recorded seven albums of their own. Johnny O'Neill and the Michael Sammes Singers provided backing vocals on the recording of "I Am the Walrus" by the Beatles in 1967, which required them to do "all sorts of swoops and phonetic noises" according to Paul McCartney: the score George Martin prepared for them included the chanting of phrases like "ho ho ho, he he he, ha ha ha", "oompah, oompah, stick it up your jumper" and "everybody's got one". They also sang on the Beatles' "Good Night", as well as on their last album, Let It Be, at the behest of Phil Spector. Sammes also provided the distinctive basso backing vocals on Olivia Newton-John's early country crossover hits, including "Banks of the Ohio", "Let Me Be There" and "If You Love Me (Let Me Know)". The Mike Sammes Singers's one entry in The Guinness Book of British Hit Singles is for "Somewhere My Love" in July 1967.

Ennio Morricone's soundtrack for the film The Good, the Bad and the Ugly contained whistling by John O'Neill. The main theme, also titled "The Good, the Bad and the Ugly", was a hit in 1968 with the soundtrack album on the charts for more than a year, reaching No. 4 on the Billboard pop album chart and No. 10 on the black album chart.

O'Neill also released a recording of traditional Irish songs The Gordon Franks Singers And Music With John O'Neill. It was recorded with The Gordon Franks Singers and Music, in which he was the solo tenor. On these recordings, O'Neill sings in an Irish accent, though his actual voice was rather more Geordie/London.

Living with his wife for the majority of their life in Ilford in Essex, they raised four daughters and later retired to Dovercourt, Essex.

== See also ==
- Batman (military)
