= Melting Pot (song) =

1969 single by Blue Mink

- Cover of the single released in Germany

Single by Blue Mink

from the album Melting Pot
- B-side: "Blue Mink"
- Released: 31 October 1969
- Genre: Pop-soul
- Length: 3:50
- Label: Philips
- Songwriters: Roger Cook; Roger Greenaway
- Producer: Blue Mink

Blue Mink singles chronology
"Melting Pot" (1969)	"Good Morning Freedom" (1970)

Official audio
- "Melting Pot" on YouTube

"Melting Pot" is the debut single from UK pop group Blue Mink. The song was written by Blue Mink's lead singer Roger Cook and long-time songwriter partner Roger Greenaway.

== Chart performance ==
The song peaked at number three on the UK Singles Chart in the first week of 1970, number 10 in Australia, and also reached number 11 in Ireland. "Melting Pot" reached number 2 in New Zealand.

== Language and legacy ==
While the song has assimilationist undertones, it also uses language deemed as "potentially offensive" by the British broadcasting regulator Ofcom in 2019, including such phrases as "curly Latin kinkies", "mixed with yellow Chinkies" and "little bitty bit of Red Indian boy".

In particular, the use of the word chink has led to complaints: "take a pinch of white man/Wrap him up in black skin. [...] Mixed with yellow Chinkees. You know you lump it all together/And you got a recipe for a get-along scene/Oh what a beautiful dream/If it could only come true".

In August 2019, British broadcaster Global permanently deleted the song from its Gold playlist after a complaint about offensive language was lodged with Ofcom. Under the direction of the Communications Act 2003, Ofcom ruled that "the phrase 'yellow Chinkies' had the potential to be highly offensive" and "that the use of derogatory language to describe ethnic groups carries a widespread potential for offence". Ofcom considered that the passage of time since the song's release and the song's positive message of racial harmony did not "mitigate the potential for offence." Ofcom determined that the "potentially offensive material was not justified by the context" and ruled the case resolved as the licensee Global had removed the song from Gold's playlist.

In September 2019, Scottish community radio station Black Diamond FM removed "Melting Pot" from its playlist and "planned to carry out refresher training with its staff" after two complaints about the song's broadcast were lodged with Ofcom. In December 2019, Ofcom ruled that Black Diamond was in breach of Ofcom's Broadcasting Code because "the potentially offensive language in this broadcast was not justified by the context".

The track was chosen by the singer-songwriter Noel Gallagher as one of his favourite tracks on the BBC Radio 1 show All Back To Mine broadcast on 25 December 1997.

== Formats and track listings ==
7" (1969)

1. "Melting Pot" (Roger Cook/Roger Greenaway)
2. "Blue Mink" (Alan Parker)

7" (1969)

1. "Melting Pot" (Roger Cook/Roger Greenaway)
2. "But Not Forever"

7" (1975)

1. "Melting Pot"
2. "Gimme Reggae"

== When the Cat's Away version ==
"Melting Pot"

Single by When the Cat's Away

from the album When the Cat's Away
- B-side: "Fire"
- Released: 1988
- Recorded: 1988
- Genre: Pop
- Length: 3:56
- Label: CBS
- Songwriters: Roger Cook and Roger Greenaway

When the Cat's Away singles chronology
"Sanctified" (1987)	"Melting Pot" (1988)	"Free Ride" (1990)

In 1988, "Melting Pot" was covered by New Zealand female vocal group and covers band When the Cat's Away.

Their version peaked at number one in the New Zealand charts, and charted for 15 weeks. The single was certified gold. It was one of three songs by New Zealand artists to reach number one in 1988.

The group released a low-budget, self-produced music video, directed by photographer Kerry Brown. The video features the group performing with a band in a white room, footage of people of different ethnic groups around Auckland, and cats.

=== Track listing ===
1. "Melting Pot" (Roger Cook/Roger Greenaway)
2. "Fire" (Bruce Springsteen)
