= Roger Cook (songwriter) =

English singer, songwriter and record producer

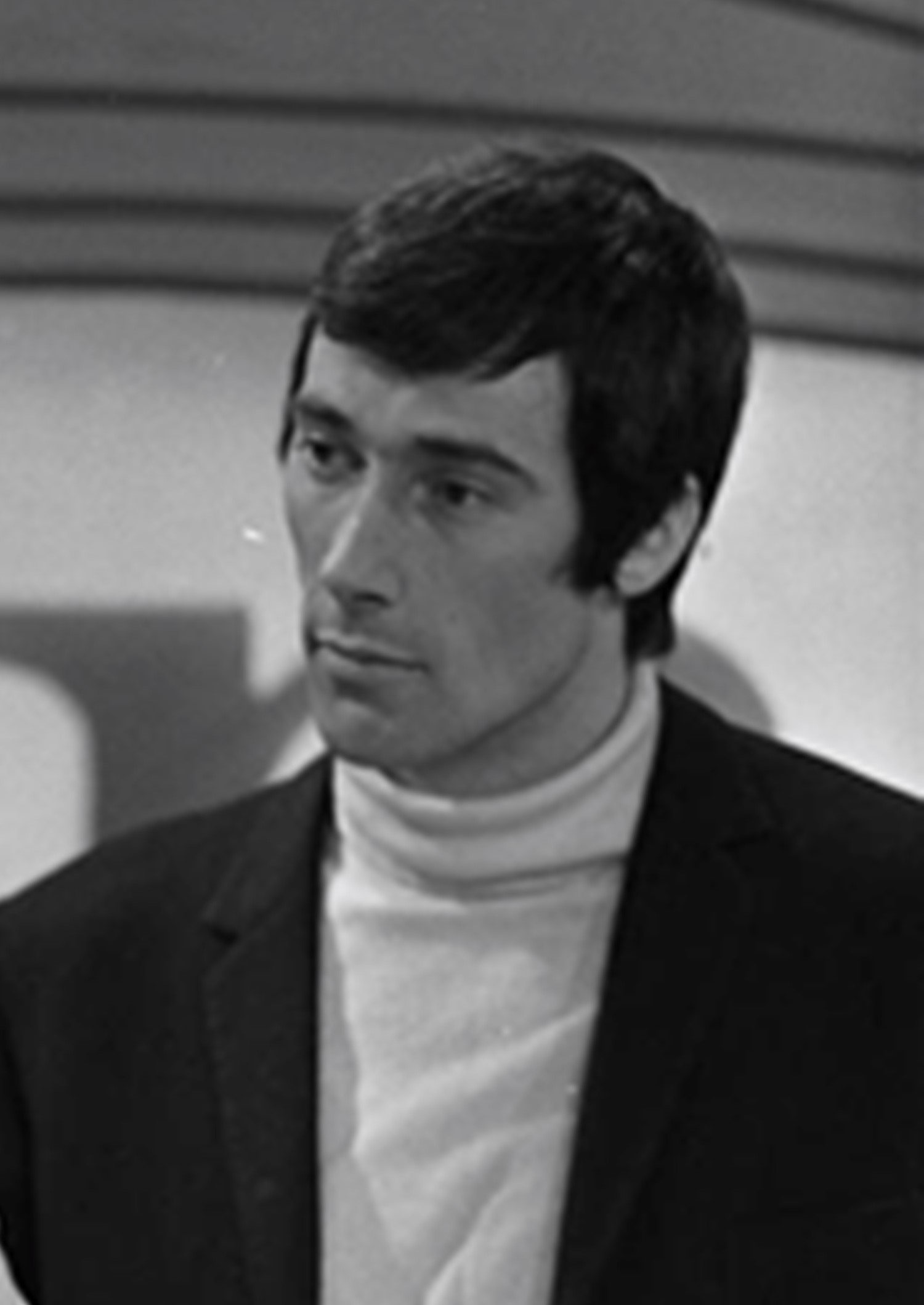
- Roger Cook (1967)

Background information
- Also known as: Roger James Cooke
- Born: Roger Frederick Cook; 19 August 1940 (age 86); Fishponds, Bristol, England
- Origin: England
- Genres: Pop
- Occupations: Singer, songwriter, record producer
- Instruments: Vocals, guitar
- Years active: 1960s–present
- Website: www.rogercook.com

Roger Frederick Cook (born 19 August 1940) is an English singer, songwriter and record producer, who has written many hit records for other recording artists. He has also had a successful recording career in his own right.

He is best known for his collaborations with Roger Greenaway. Cook's co-compositions have included "You've Got Your Troubles", and the transatlantic million-selling songs, "I'd Like to Teach the World to Sing (In Perfect Harmony)" and "Long Cool Woman in a Black Dress". They were the first UK songwriting partnership to win an Ivor Novello Award as Songwriters of the Year in two successive years.

In 1997, Cook became the first British songwriter to enter the Nashville Songwriters Hall of Fame.

== Biography ==
=== Early life ===
Cook was born in Fishponds, Bristol, England. Most of the hits he has written have been in collaboration with Roger Greenaway, whom he originally met while they were members of a close harmony group, the Kestrels. Continuing on as a duo, Cook and Greenaway then had a brief but successful recording career between 1965 and 1967 as David and Jonathan, scoring hits with a cover version of the Beatles' "Michelle", and their own "Lovers of the World Unite". They also penned their first hit as songwriters for others in 1965, with "You've Got Your Troubles", a UK number 2 and US number 7 for the Fortunes.

As a performer Cook is best remembered as a member of Blue Mink, sharing lead vocals with Madeline Bell. The group was formed in 1969, primarily as a producer's outfit, featuring a wealth of top session musicians including Herbie Flowers (bassist), Alan Parker (guitarist), Roger Coulam (keyboardist) and Barry Morgan (drummer), who were simultaneously members of the jazz / rock / big band fusion outfit CCS, another mainly recording act.

Over the next four years Blue Mink had several Top 20 entries, mostly co-written by Cook, the most successful being "Melting Pot" and "The Banner Man", before they disbanded in 1974.

Cook also sang backing vocals on some of the earliest recordings by Elton John, and continued to record albums as a solo artist, including Study (1970), credited to Roger James Cooke, Meanwhile Back at the World (1972), Minstrel in Flight (1973) and Alright (1976).

=== Major hits ===
Amongst hits he has written with others, including Greenaway and writers such as Albert Hammond, Mike Hazlewood and Tony Macaulay are "I'd Like to Teach the World to Sing (In Perfect Harmony)" (The New Seekers), "Good Times, Better Times" (Cliff Richard), "Softly Whispering I Love You" (The Congregation), "Something's Gotten Hold of My Heart" (Gene Pitney), "Home Lovin' Man" (Andy Williams), "Blame It on the Pony Express" (Johnny Johnson and the Bandwagon), "Something Old, Something New" (The Fantastics), "Conversations" and "Something Tells Me (Something's Gonna Happen Tonight)" (Cilla Black), "I've Got You on My Mind", "My Baby Loves Lovin'" (White Plains), "Gasoline Alley Bred" and "Long Cool Woman in a Black Dress" (The Hollies); "Freedom Come, Freedom Go" (The Fortunes), "Doctor's Orders" (Sunny), "I Was Kaiser Bill's Batman" (Whistling Jack Smith) and "Like Sister and Brother" (The Drifters). Cook co-wrote "I Just Want to Dance with You" with John Prine; Prine recorded the song in 1986 for his album German Afternoons, and it was a hit for George Strait in 1998.

Cook and Greenaway also wrote "High 'N' Dry" (Cliff Richard), which was the B-side of "Congratulations", the runner-up song for the UK Eurovision Song Contest in 1968.

=== Move to the USA ===
In 1975 Cook moved to the US and settled in Nashville, Tennessee, where he produced more hits including "Talking in Your Sleep" (Crystal Gayle in 1978, first recorded by Marmalade) and "Love Is on a Roll" (Don Williams). In 1977 he produced The Nashville Album, a record by Chip Hawkes, who had recently left the Tremeloes (but would rejoin the group a few years thereafter). He also opened a publishing company with accomplished songwriter Ralph Murphy named Pic-A-Lic.

In 1992 he joined former Stranglers member Hugh Cornwell and guitarist Andrew West to release an album, CCW. Later he turned to writing for the stage and he has worked on two musicals, Beautiful and Damned, based on the lives of Jazz Age author F. Scott Fitzgerald and his wife Zelda, in collaboration with Les Reed; and Don't You Rock Me Daddio, set in 1957 at the height of the skiffle age, with Joe Brown.

In 1997, Cook became the first British songwriter to enter the Nashville Songwriters Hall of Fame.

Cook's daughter, Katie, is a host/presenter for cable network CMT.

== Discography ==
=== Albums ===
- Study (1970)
- Meanwhile Back at the World (1972)
- Minstrel in Flight (1973)
- Alright (1976)
- Mother Tongue (1980)

=== As songwriter ===
- "Banner Man" (with Roger Greenaway and Herbie Flowers) Blue Mink, 1971 UK No. 3
- "(Blame It) On the Pony Express" (with Roger Greenaway and Tony Macaulay) Johnny Johnson & the Bandwagon, 1970 UK No. 7
- "Freedom Come, Freedom Go" (with Roger Greenaway, Albert Hammond and Mike Hazlewood) the Fortunes, 1971 UK No. 6
- "Home Lovin' Man" (with Roger Greenaway and Tony Macaulay) Andy Williams, 1970 UK No. 7
- "I Believe in You" (with Sam Hogin) 1980 Don Williams
- "I Was Kaiser Bill's Batman" (with Roger Greenaway) Whistling Jack Smith, 1967 UK No. 5
- "I'd Like to Teach the World to Sing (In Perfect Harmony)" (with Roger Greenaway, Bill Backer and Billy Davis) The Hillside Singers, 1971 US No. 13; The New Seekers, 1971 UK No. 1, 1972 US No. 7
- "If It Wasn't for the Reason That I Love You" (with Roger Greenaway) Miki Anthony, 1973 UK No. 27
- "Long Cool Woman in a Black Dress" (with Roger Greenaway and Allan Clarke) The Hollies, 1972 UK No. 32, US No. 2
- "Melting Pot" (with Roger Greenaway) Blue Mink, 1969 UK No. 3
- "Softly Whispering I Love You" (with Roger Greenaway) The Congregation, 1971 UK No. 4, 1972 Ger No. 10, US No. 29
- "Something Tells Me (Something's Gonna Happen Tonight)" (with Roger Greenaway) Cilla Black, 1971 UK No. 3
- "Something's Gotten Hold of My Heart" (with Roger Greenaway) Gene Pitney, 1967 UK No. 5; Marc Almond with Gene Pitney, 1989 UK No. 1
- "A Way of Life" (with Roger Greenaway) Family Dogg, 1969 UK No. 6
- "You've Got Your Troubles" (with Roger Greenaway) The Fortunes, 1965 UK No. 2
- "I Just Want to Dance with You" (with John Prine) 1986
- "Glory of True Love" (with John Prine) 2005
