= The Congregation (band) =

- Also known as: The English Congregation (US, Canada)
- Origin: England
- Genres: pop, vocal
- Years active: Early 1970s
- Label: EMI Columbia

The Congregation was a British pop ensemble, formed by Roger Cook and Roger Greenaway in England. In the United States it was credited as The English Congregation.

The band's biggest hit was a cover version of "Softly Whispering I Love You" (originally recorded by Cook and Greenaway's previous group, David and Jonathan), which peaked at No. 4 on the UK Singles Chart in 1971, No. 29 on the Billboard Hot 100 chart in the US, No. 1 in South Africa, No. 12 in Australia and New Zealand and No. 10 in Germany. The group's lead singer was the former Plastic Penny vocalist, Brian Keith, who later became a session musician. With no further top 40 hits, The Congregation was a transatlantic one-hit wonder.

The band changed its name on releases in the United States to avoid confusion with the Mike Curb Congregation, which also recorded "Softly Whispering I Love You".

== Discography ==
(All UK releases on Columbia of Columbia Graphophone Co./EMI; US releases leased to Atco and Signpost)

Singles

- "Softly Whispering I Love You"/"When Susie Takes the Plane" (Columbia DB 8830 & Atco 6865, 1971)
- "Lovers of the World Unite"/"Love Is the Sweetest Thing I Know" (Columbia DB 8894 & Signpost 70002, 1972)
- "Jesahel"/"Sing Me a Love Song" (Columbia DB 8906 & Signpost 70004, 1972)
- "I Will Survive"/"If I Could Have My Way" (Columbia 006-05 170, Germany, 1972)
- "It Didn't Matter"/"Loving Your Neighbour" (Columbia DB 8980, 1973)
- "Jubilation"/"Love Is the Sweetest Thing I Know" (Columbia DB 9006, 1973)

Albums

- Softly Whispering I Love You (Columbia SCX 6490 & Signpost 7217, 1972)
- Jesahel (Signpost 8405, 1972)
- Greatest Hits (EMIdisc 1 C 048-51 828, Germany, 1972)
- The Congregation (Columbia SCX 6517, 1973)

== See also ==
- List of number-one singles in 1972 (New Zealand)
- List of 1970s one-hit wonders in the United States
