= Alan Parker (musician) =

British guitarist and composer (born 1944)

Alan Frederick Parker (born 26 August 1944) is an English guitarist and composer.

Parker was born in Matlock, Derbyshire, and was trained by Julian Bream at London’s Royal Academy of Music. He had a successful career as session guitarist starting in the late 1960s, and played with Blue Mink, The Congregation, CCS and Serge Gainsbourg, together with his own studio session bands Hungry Wolf and Ugly Custard.

Much of his session work has gone uncredited, but he has been named as the electric guitarist on Donovan's "Hurdy Gurdy Man", the Walker Brothers' "No Regrets", David Bowie's "Holy Holy", "1984" and "Rebel Rebel", Elton John's "Take Me to the Pilot", Mike Batt's "The Ride to Agadir" and the Top of the Pops theme music version of "Whole Lotta Love". He has also recorded a number of albums for the De Wolfe Music and KPM Music libraries.

Parker's later work comprised compositions for film and television. His television work includes Angels, Moody and Pegg, Minder, One Summer, The Glory Boys, Dempsey and Makepeace, French Fields, Room at the Bottom, Red Fox, ITN's News At Ten, and the BBC series Walking with Cavemen and Coast. His film scores include Jaws 3-D (1983), American Gothic (1988), What's Eating Gilbert Grape (1993) and Alex Rider: Stormbreaker (2006). He also contributed music for three children's series; Gideon, Teetime and Claudia and Snowy and the Buttercup Buskers.

Parker is also known to have owned Jimi Hendrix's Epiphone acoustic guitar, which was given to him by Hendrix in March 1970. He is also the father in law of the comedian and actor Ben Miller.
