= Madeline Bell =

American soul singer (born 1942)

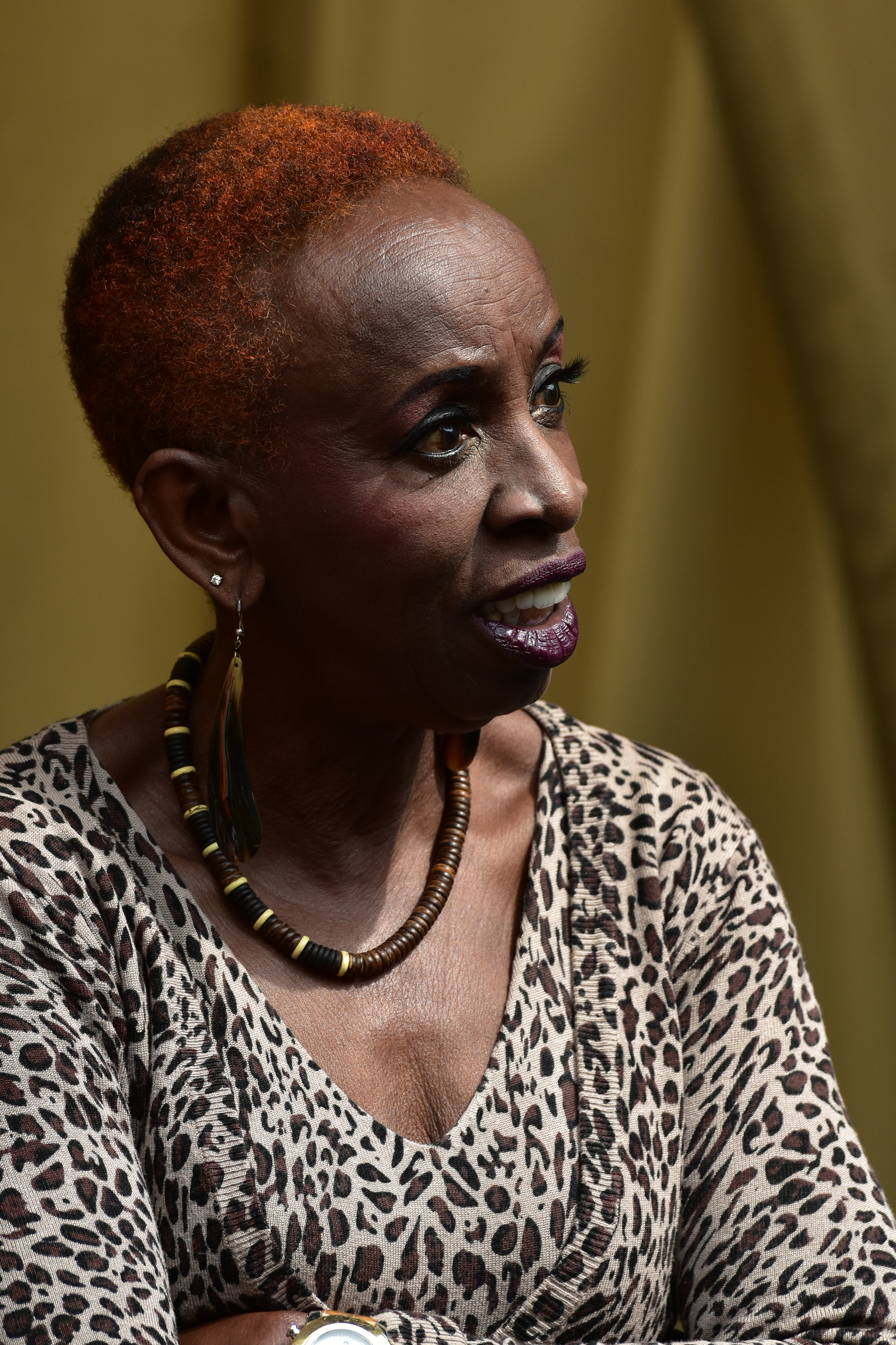
- Bell on stage in 2016

Background information
- Born: July 23, 1942 (age 84); Newark, New Jersey, U.S.
- Genre: Soul
- Occupation: Singer-songwriter
- Instrument: Vocals
- Years active: 1965–present
- Labels: RPM; RCA; Columbia; His Master's Voice; Philips; Pye
- Website: madelinebell.com

Madeline Bell (born July 23, 1942) is an American soul singer, who became famous as a performer in the UK during the 1960s and 1970s with pop group Blue Mink, having arrived from the United States in the gospel show Black Nativity in 1962, with the vocal group Bradford Singers.

== Life and career ==
Bell was born in Newark, New Jersey, United States. She worked as a session singer, most notably backing Dusty Springfield and Donna Summer early in her career. Her first major solo hit was a cover version of Dee Dee Warwick's single "I'm Gonna Make You Love Me", which performed better on the US Billboard Hot 100 than the original.

In 1968, Bell sang background and duet vocals on a number of Serge Gainsbourg songs, including "Comic Strip", "Ford Mustang" and "Bloody Jack". In 1969, she contributed backing vocals on the Rolling Stones song "You Can't Always Get What You Want" and she also provided backing vocals on a number of Donovan recordings, notably his 1969 hit single "Barabajagal", recorded with The Jeff Beck Group.

Bell then joined contemporary pop combo Blue Mink, with whom she had a number of Top 20 hits with Philips Records in the UK, including "Melting Pot", "Our World", "Randy", "Banner Man", "Good Morning Freedom", "Sunday", "By the Devil I Was Tempted" and "Stay with Me". Before joining Blue Mink in late 1969 she sang solo, and her cover version of "Picture Me Gone" is still a Northern Soul favourite today, as is "What Am I Supposed to Do", from 1968, a two-minute B-side tune co-written with future Led Zeppelin member John Paul Jones, then working as one of London's most in-demand session bassists. (Bell also sang backup on Joe Cocker's "Bye Bye Blackbird" in 1969, which featured a guitar solo from another Led Zeppelin member, Jimmy Page.) Her version of Paul McCartney's "Step Inside Love" was a minor hit in the US in 1969.

In 1973, Bell fronted the BBC Two television series Colour My Soul, which ran for nine episodes through to 1974. Guests included John Paul Jones, Jimmy Helms and Doris Troy.

Jones later arranged, produced and recorded Bell's 1973 RCA album Comin' Atcha. She contributed to the soundtrack of the romance film A Touch of Class (1973). She also sang backup for the Dave Clark Five's single release, "Everybody Get Together", and contributed backing vocals to Elton John's 1972 album, Honky Chateau.

Bell has also provided backing vocals on a number of other artists' recordings, notably Tom Parker's neo-classical arrangements, and in 1975, performed with Sunny and Sue (originally members of Brotherhood of Man) at the Eurovision Song Contest in Stockholm, Sweden, providing backing vocals for the German entry "Ein Lied kann eine Brücke sein", performed by Joy Fleming. She worked with Kiki Dee and Lesley Duncan. In 1975, she appeared on Sunny Side of the Street for Bryn Haworth. And one year later, Bell sang backing vocals on We Can't Go on Meeting Like This, the second album by the band Hummingbird. That same year she did backing vocals on Yes drummer Alan White's only solo album Ramshackled, with other chorists Vicki Brown and Joanne Williams.

Bell also joined the French disco group Space, providing lead vocals on two of their albums. One of the songs she provided lead vocals on was "Save Your Love For Me" from 1978, which charted high in many countries. She also provided backing vocals for another French artist, Cerrone. Bell also appears on Giorgio Moroder's 1979 album, E=MC².

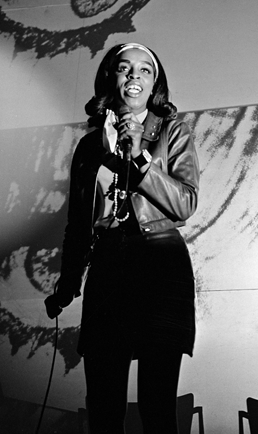
Bell in 1968

Since the 1970s, Bell has continued singing solo and also performed in a number of stage shows. She continues to live in Spain since her husband, drummer Barry Reeves (once of the Ferris Wheel), died from pneumonia on February 6, 2010. She regularly tours Europe singing jazz and popular songs. In 1982, she added background vocals to the fantasy film Alicja. She then again teamed up with John Paul Jones in 1985, contributing performances ("Take It or Leave It" and "Here I Am") to the soundtrack album Scream for Help.

Bell was the voice behind the 1980s advertising campaign for Brooke Bond, a brand of tea bag in the UK. The music was composed by Ronnie Bond. She also provided vocals on the jingles of another 1980s advertising campaign, British Gas's Wonderfuel Gas, which began in 1982.

== Solo discography ==
- 1967: Bell's a Poppin' (Philips (re-released in 1968 as I'm Gonna Make You Love Me)
- 1968: Doin' Things (Philips)
- 1971: Madeline Bell (Philips)
- 1973: Comin' Atcha (RCA Victor)
- 1976: This Is One Girl (Pye)
- 1988: Beat out That Rhythm on a Drum (Koch Jazz)
- 1992: City Life (with Georgie Fame) (BBC Radio 2)
- 1993: Madeline (Four Corners)
- 1993: Have You Met Miss Bell (Polydor)
- 1995: Girl Talk (Willibrord)
- 1995: Christmas Card (Willibrord)
- 1998: Yes I Can: A Melting Pot (International Music Management)
- 2000: Blessed (Baileo Music Productions B.V.)
- 2004: Blue Christmas (Baileo Music Productions B.V.)
- 2011: Tribute to Ray Charles (Baileo Music Productions B.V.)
- 2013: Together Again with David Martin (Angel Air)
- 2014: Singer: The Musical (Proper)

== With Alan White ==
- 1976 : Ramshackled - With Kenny Craddock, Colin Gibson, Henry Lowther, Vicki Brown, Steve Gregory, David Bedford, Jon Anderson, Steve Howe, etc.

== Discography with Space ==
- 1977: Magic Fly' (Vogue)
- 1977: Deliverance (Vogue)
- 1978: Just Blue (Vogue)
- 2011: From Earth To Mars (RDS Records)
