= Roger Greenaway =

English singer, songwriter and record producer

Roger Greenaway OBE
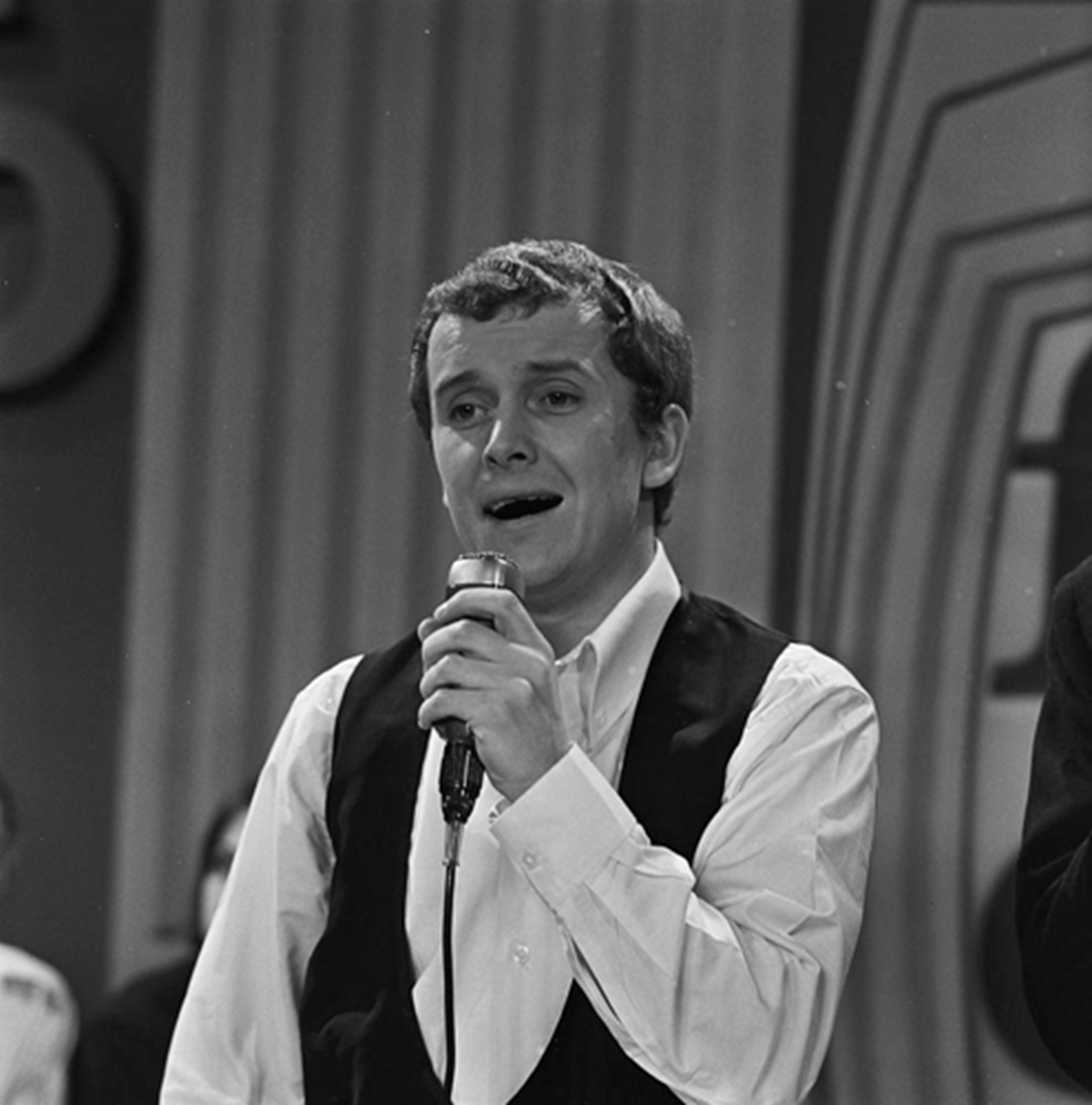
- Greenaway (1967)

Background information
- Born: Roger John Reginald Greenaway; 23 August 1938 (age 88); Fishponds, Gloucestershire, England
- Genre: Pop
- Occupations: Singer, songwriter, record producer
- Instruments: Vocals, guitar
- Years active: 1960s–present

Roger John Reginald Greenaway OBE (born 23 August 1938) is an English singer, songwriter and record producer, best known for his collaborations with Roger Cook and Tony Burrows. His compositions have included "You've Got Your Troubles" and the transatlantic million-selling songs "I'd Like to Teach the World to Sing (In Perfect Harmony)" and "Long Cool Woman in a Black Dress". They were the first UK songwriting partnership to be granted an Ivor Novello Award as 'Songwriters of the Year' in two successive years.

In 2009, Greenaway was inducted into the Songwriters Hall of Fame.

== Early life ==
Roger Greenaway was born in Fishponds, Bristol, England.

== Early career ==
Greenaway is best known for his works with Roger Cook. Both Greenaway and Cook were members of the close harmony group the Kestrels. While on tour they decided to begin writing songs together. Their first was "You've Got Your Troubles", a No. 2 UK hit single for the Fortunes (1965), which also made No. 7 on the US Billboard Hot 100. It was the first of several successes they enjoyed during the next few years. Later that year, they began recording together as David and Jonathan. Their first single "Laughing Fit To Cry" did not chart, but they scored hits in 1966 with their cover version of the Beatles' "Michelle" and their own "Lovers of the World Unite". Their penultimate single, "Softly Whispering I Love You", in 1967, was not a success at the time, but became a No. 4 UK hit in 1971 for a subsequent Cook-Greenaway collaboration, the Congregation. In 1968 Cook and Greenaway announced that they would no longer be recording as a duo but would continue as songwriters.

=== Songwriting ===
Their hits as writers for other acts, sometimes with other collaborators, include: "Home Lovin' Man" (Andy Williams); "Blame It on the Pony Express" (Johnny Johnson and the Bandwagon); "Hallejuah" (Deep Purple); "Doctor's Orders" (Sunny (UK) and Carol Douglas (US)); "It Makes No Difference" (Joe Dolan); "Something Tells Me (Something's Gonna Happen Tonight)" (Cilla Black (UK) and Bobbi Martin (US)); "I've Got You On My Mind", "When You Are a King", "My Baby Loves Lovin'" (White Plains); "Long Cool Woman in a Black Dress", "Gasoline Alley Bred", (The Hollies); "You've Got Your Troubles", "Freedom Come, Freedom Go" (The Fortunes); "Banner Man", "Melting Pot", "Good Morning Freedom" (Blue Mink); "Green Grass" (Gary Lewis & the Playboys); "New Orleans" (Harley Quinne); "A Way of Life" (The Family Dogg) and "Something's Gotten Hold of My Heart" (Gene Pitney).

They also wrote "High 'N' Dry" (Cliff Richard), which was the B-side of "Congratulations",” the runner-up song for the UK Eurovision Song Contest in 1968.

The New Seekers' "I'd Like to Teach the World to Sing (In Perfect Harmony)" began life as a Cook–Greenaway collaboration called "True Love and Apple Pie", recorded by Susan Shirley. The song was then rewritten by Cook, Greenaway, Coca-Cola advertising executive Bill Backer, and Billy Davis, and recorded as a Coca-Cola radio commercial, with the lyric "I'd like to buy the world a Coke and keep it company." First aired on American radio in 1970, it was also used as a TV commercial a year later, sparking public demand for its release as a single. Reworked, again, to remove the references to the brand name, the single climbed to No. 1 in the UK and No. 7 in the US in 1972. The song has sold over a million copies in the UK.

=== Blue Mink, Pipkins, and Brotherhood of Man ===
When Blue Mink were formed in 1969, Greenaway was asked to be lead vocalist alongside Madeline Bell; he declined the offer and recommended Cook, who accepted. The following year Greenaway teamed up for a while with singer and former Kestrels band-mate Tony Burrows to form the Pipkins, a duo who had a Top 10 novelty hit in 1970 with "Gimme Dat Ding". The same year, he was briefly a member of Brotherhood of Man, also featuring Burrows as lead singer, who scored a UK and US top 20 hit with "United We Stand".

=== Later works ===
After Cook moved to the US in 1975, Greenaway worked with other partners, notably Geoff Stephens, both being jointly responsible for Dana's 1975 UK No. 4 song, "It's Gonna be a Cold Cold Christmas", and Crystal Gayle's 1980 US No. 1 country song, "It's Like We Never Said Goodbye". With Barry Mason he penned "Say You'll Stay Until Tomorrow" for Tom Jones, which spent ten weeks within the Top 40 of the Billboard Hot Country Singles (now Hot Country Songs) chart, and went to No. 1 for one week on 26 February 1977.

Greenaway took an increasing role in business administration, becoming Chairman of the Performing Right Society in 1983 and, in 1995, taking charge of the European ASCAP office. He also wrote advertising jingles for Allied Carpets, Asda and British Gas.

== Personal life ==
Greenaway's son is Gavin Greenaway, a composer and conductor.

== Awards and honours ==
In 2000, he was appointed as an officer of the Order of the British Empire for services to the music industry. He was inducted into the Songwriters Hall of Fame in New York in 2009.

== See also ==
- Gavin Greenaway
