= The Fortunes discography =

- Studio albums: 8
- Live albums: 1
- Compilation albums: 9
- Singles: 37

This is the discography of British beat group The Fortunes.

== Albums ==
=== Studio albums ===
Title	Album details	Peak chart positions	
Title	Album details	US	CAN
The Fortunes	Released: October 1965; Label: Decca, Press	—	—
That Same Old Feeling	Released: June 1970; Label: World Pacific; US-only release	—	—
Here Comes That Rainy Day Feeling Again	Released: June 1971; Label: Capitol	134	71
Storm in a Teacup	Released: April 1972; Label: Capitol	—	—
Some Bridges	Released: 1999; Label: StormFree	—	—
Heroes Never Die	Released: 2004; Label: Schaaf; Netherlands-only release	—	—
Play On	Released: 2008; Label: StormFree	—	—
Another Road	Released: June 2010; Label: StormFree	—	—
Special Moments	Released: December 2021; Label: StormFree	—	—
"—" denotes releases that did not chart or were not released in that territory.

=== Live albums ===
Title	Album details
Past and Present	Released: May 2015; Label: StormFree
The Fortunes Down Under	Released: August 2018; Label: StormFree; Australia-only release
Live at the BBC 1965–1972	Released: 1 December 2018; Label: TFOR2; Box set of 53 songs from Brian Matthew's Top of The Pops radio shows
Sixty Years Live	Released: March 2023; Label: StormFree; Live recordings from Step Into the 60s theatre shows in 2022 plus recent studio singles
The Fortunes Tour The United States	Released: June 2026; Label: StormFree; USA-only release

=== Compilation albums ===
Title	Album details	Peak chart positions
Title	Album details	NL
Fortunes	Released: 1972; Label: Capitol	—
Remembering the Fortunes	Released: 1976; Label: Decca	—
Hit Collection	Released: 1984; Label: Elecstar	—
All the Hits and More	Released: 1987; Label: Qualitel	14
You've Got Your Troubles	Released: 1992; Label: Trace Trading	—
The Very Best of the Fortunes (1967–1972)	Released: March 1995; Label: Taragon; US-only release	—
The World of the Fortunes	Released: 1996; Label: Spectrum Music	—
The Very Best of the Fortunes	Released: 1999; Label: Spectrum Music	—
The Fortunes - Gold	Released: 2013; Label: Stormfree Records	—
The Complete Decca Singles 1963–1967	Released: 9 February 2015; Label: Dynamic Voice	—

== Singles ==
Title	Year	Peak chart positions									
Title	Year	UK	AUS	BEL (FL)	BEL (WA)	CAN	GER	IRE	NL	NZ	US
"Summertime Summertime" (with the Cliftones)	1963	—	—	—	—	—	—	—	—	—	—
"Caroline"	1964	—	—	—	—	—	—	—	—	—	—
"Come On Girl"	1964	—	—	—	—	—	—	—	—	—	—
"Look Homeward Angel"	1964	—	—	—	—	—	—	—	—	—	—
"You've Got Your Troubles"	1965	2	12	10	48	1	28	3	3	1	7
"Here It Comes Again"	1965	4	28	12	42	4	40	5	2	4	27
"This Golden Ring"	1966	15	—	—	—	40	—	—	8	—	82
"You Gave Me Somebody to Love"	1966	—	—	—	—	—	—	—	— (Note: "You Gave Me Somebody to Love" didn't enter the Dutch Single Top 100 (then a top 20), but did peak at number 38 on the Dutch Top 40.)	—	—
"Silent Street" (US and Canada-only release)	1966	—	—	—	—	—	—	—	—	—	—
"Is It Really Worth Your While"	1966	57 (Note: Chart position is from the official UK "Breakers List".)	—	—	—	—	—	—	—	—	—
"Our Love Has Gone"	1967	—	—	—	—	—	—	—	—	—	—
"The Idol"	1967	—	—	—	—	—	—	—	—	—	—
"Just Another Dream" (Netherlands-only release)	1967	—	—	—	—	—	—	—	—	—	—
"Fire Brigade"	1968	—	—	—	—	—	—	—	—	—	—
"Loving Cup"	1968	57	—	—	—	—	—	—	—	—	—
"Seasons in the Sun"	1968	—	—	—	—	—	—	—	4	—	—
"Celebration of the Year" (Netherlands-only release)	1969	—	—	—	—	—	—	—	28	—	—
"Ballad of the Alamo"	1969	—	—	—	—	—	—	—	—	—	—
"Books and Films"	1969	—	—	—	—	—	—	—	—	—	—
"That Same Old Feeling" (US and Canada-only release)	1970	—	—	—	—	40	—	—	—	—	62
"Here Comes That Rainy Day Feeling Again"	1971	51	43	23	21	12	—	—	8	—	15
"Freedom Come, Freedom Go"	1971	6	13	18	—	— (Note: "Freedom Come, Freedom Go" did not enter the RPM Top 100 Singles, but it did peak at number 16 on the Adult Contemporary chart.)	19	5	12	3	72
"Storm in a Teacup"	1972	7	65	—	—	—	—	9	— (Note: "Storm in a Teacup" didn't enter the Dutch Single Top 100 (then a top 30), but did peak at number 5 on the Single Tip chart.)	15	—
"Baby by the Way"	1972	—	—	—	—	—	—	—	—	—	—
"The Power and the Glory" (France-only release)	1972	—	—	—	—	—	—	—	—	—	—
"Wait Until September" (US and Canada-only release)	1972	—	—	—	—	—	—	—	—	—	—
"Everything Is Out of Season"	1972	—	—	—	—	—	—	—	—	—	—
"Secret Love"	1972	—	—	—	—	—	—	—	—	—	—
"Whenever It's a Sunday"	1973	—	—	—	—	—	—	—	—	—	—
"These Are the Good Old Days" (Netherlands-only release)	1976	—	—	—	—	—	—	—	—	—	—
"I Can't Believe It's Over"	1977	—	—	—	—	—	—	—	—	—	—
"Storm in a Teacup" (re-recording; Netherlands-only release)	1982	—	—	—	—	—	—	—	—	—	—
"Dangerous Games" (Netherlands-only release)	1983	—	—	—	—	—	—	—	—	—	—
"Linsey" (Netherlands-only release)	1984	—	—	—	—	—	—	—	—	—	—
"When Your Heart Speaks" (Netherlands-only release)	1987	—	—	—	—	—	—	—	87	—	—
"Never Too Far"	2021	—	—	—	—	—	—	—	—	—	—
"One Special Moment"	2021	—	—	—	—	—	—	—	—	—	—
"Hello My Friend"	2022	—	—	—	—	—	—	—	—	—	—
"One Special Moment (US Remix)"	2023	—	—	—	—	—	—	—	—	—	—
"I Just Don't Know What to Do with Myself (Live)"	2023	—	—	—	—	—	—	—	—	—	—
"Never Too Far (Remix)"	2023	—	—	—	—	—	—	—	—	—	—
"—" denotes releases that did not chart or were not released in that territory.
