= Barry Mason =

English songwriter (1935–2021)

Barry Mason MBE
- Birth name: John Barry Mason
- Born: 12 July 1935; Wigan, Lancashire, England
- Died: 16 April 2021 (aged 85)
- Genres: Popular music
- Occupations: Singer; songwriter
- Years active: 1960s–2021
- Labels: Magnet
- Formerly of: Les Reed
- Website: barrymasonsongwriter.co.uk

John Barry Mason MBE (12 July 1935 – 16 April 2021) was an English singer and songwriter. A leading songwriter of the 1960s, he wrote the bulk of his most successful songs in partnership with Les Reed. Mason gained many gold and platinum awards for his work including five Ivor Novello Awards, the most recent of them in 1998.

== Life and career ==
Mason was born in Wigan, eldest son of Phyllis née Hart, and journalist, Cecil Mason, who died when Barry was nine. He had a younger brother, and two half-sisters by his mother's second husband. He grew up in the village of Coppull, near Chorley in Lancashire and attended Baines Grammar School in Poulton-Le-Fylde. His songwriting credits included three UK Singles Chart number ones, "Love Grows (Where My Rosemary Goes)", "The Last Waltz", and "I Pretend", as well as "Here It Comes Again", "A Man Without Love", "Winter World of Love", "Delilah", "Les Bicyclettes de Belsize", "Say You'll Stay Until Tomorrow", "Kiss Me Goodbye", and "You Just Might See Me Cry".

His songs have been recorded by Tom Jones, Dalida, P. J. Proby, David Essex, The Drifters, Rod Stewart, Petula Clark, Perry Como, Elvis Presley, Engelbert Humperdinck, The Fortunes, Charles Aznavour, Tony Christie, Connie Francis, Mireille Mathieu, Barbra Streisand, The Dave Clark Five, Cliff Portwood, Malcolm Roberts and Our Kid.

Mason credited his start in songwriting to his first hit in 1960 as a producer. "I met this boy called Tommy Bruce and I spent my last few pounds making a demo of him singing an old Fats Waller song, Ain't Misbehavin' – and he had a hit (No.3, UK, 1960). Suddenly, I was his manager, not knowing anything about the business. But the important thing was, I was in the business." Mason and Reed wrote a song for Kathy Kirby, "I'll Try Not to Cry", as part of A Song for Europe 1965, the BBC's contest to choose the United Kingdom entry for that year's Eurovision Song Contest in Naples. The song was beaten by "I Belong". "The Last Waltz" became a million-selling UK number one for Engelbert Humperdinck in September 1967. In 1968, the duo scored another UK number 1 hit with Des O'Connor's recording of "I Pretend".

Mason and Reed also wrote "Who's Doctor Who", a novelty song recorded by Doctor Who star Frazer Hines in 1967, but it failed to chart. They also wrote "Marching on Together" (aka "Leeds! Leeds! Leeds!"), the anthem of Leeds United F.C. His last chart topping song was "Love Grows (Where My Rosemary Goes), for session group, Edison Lighthouse, in January 1970.

Mason enjoyed singing his catalogue of hits and in the early 1970s often took a working vacation to Malta playing at various venues accompanied by his small band including pianist Norman Hale (The Tornados) and drummer Jon Werrell (The Mojos).

He was the major songwriter for the English singer Declan Galbraith for his first album Declan (2002), including the hit "Tell Me Why" (No. 29 in UK) and "Till the Day We Meet Again".

He founded his own publishing company, Barry Mason Enterprises Ltd.

Mason was a frequent guest on the BBC1 panel game Pop Quiz, hosted by Mike Read.

He was appointed Member of the Order of the British Empire (MBE) in the 2020 Birthday Honours for services to music.

== Personal life ==
Barry Mason had two daughters and a son. He died in April 2021.

== Discography ==
=== Albums ===
- The Songwriter (1976), Magnet
- The Singer and the Songs (1978), Magnet
