= Paper Dolls (group) =

English musical group (1966–1970)

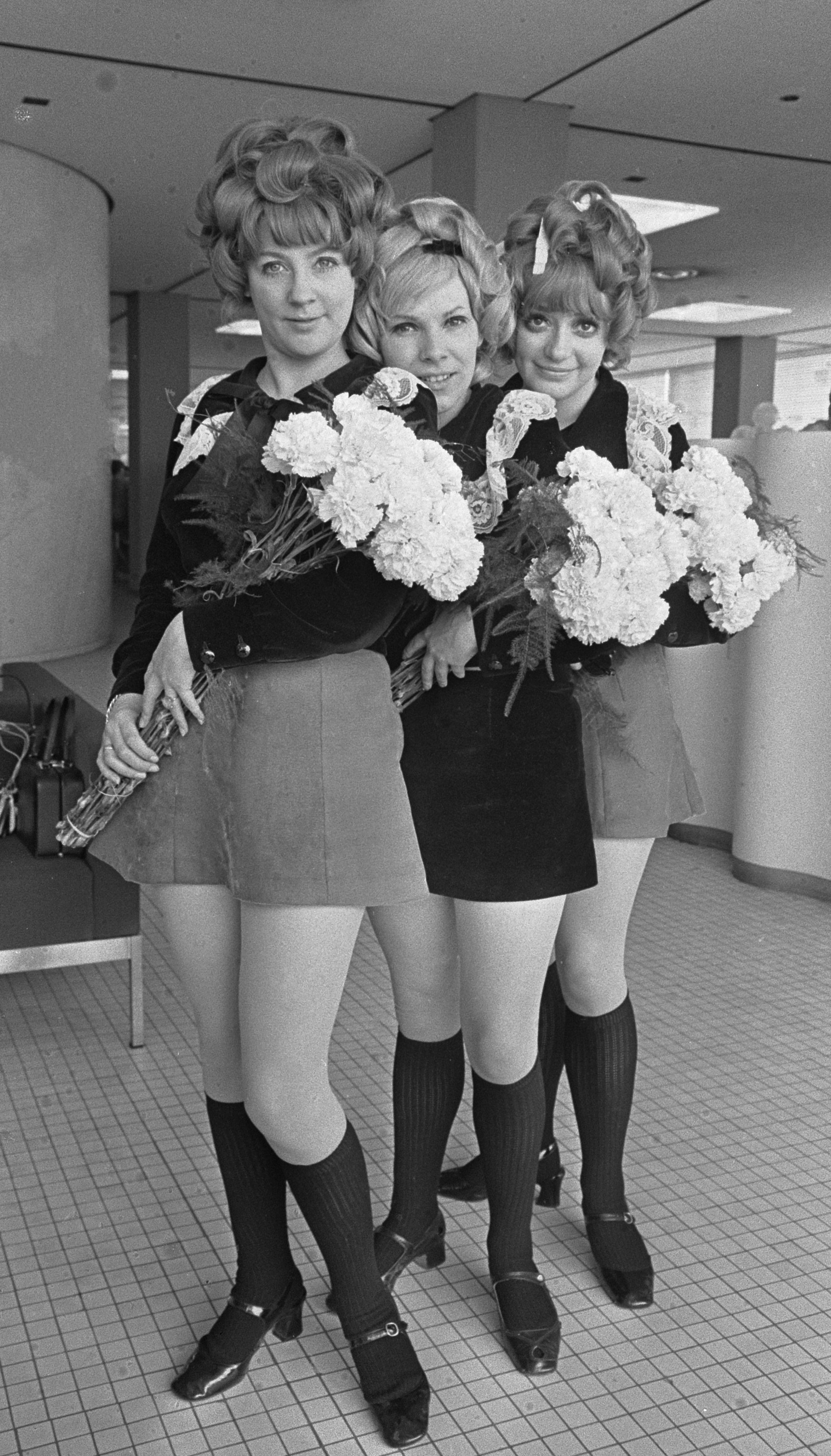
- Paper Dolls in 1968

Background information
- Origin: Northampton, England
- Genres: Pop music
- Years active: 1966–1970
- Labels: Pye, RCA
- Past members: Susie Mathis (Tiger); Sue Marshall (Copper); Pauline Bennett (Spyder)

The Paper Dolls were a late 1960s British female vocal trio from Northampton, comprising lead vocalist Susie 'Tiger' Mathis, Pauline 'Spyder' Bennett and Sue 'Copper' Marshall. They were one of the few British girl groups of the late 1960s.

Each member of the group had a nickname: Tiger, Spyder and Copper.

== Career ==
=== "Something Here in My Heart" ===
Signed to Pye Records, Paper Dolls had one solitary success. The song "Something Here in My Heart (Keeps a Tellin' Me No)", which was their debut single, and was written by Tony Macaulay and John Macleod, reached number 11 on the UK Singles Chart in 1968. The Dolls also recorded another Macaulay/Macleod hit composition "Baby Take Me in Your Arms". The enduring image of the Paper Dolls, as seen on Top of the Pops, was inescapably that of three young women in miniskirts, the popularity and brevity of which were at their height at the time. The name of the group was suggestive of "dolly birds", a rather impersonal term which, in the 1970s journalist Christopher Booker associated with "girls [being] transformed into throwaway plastic objects".

=== Follow-up releases ===
Several follow-ups, notably "My Life (Is in Your Hands)" and "Someday", failed to chart. Their greatest disappointment came when their producers arranged for them to record another Macaulay co-composition "Build Me Up Buttercup" later that year. Owing to a misunderstanding, they never turned up for the session and instead the song was given to the Foundations, whose version became a hit single. The flip side of "Someday", titled "Any Old Time (You're Lonely and Sad)" was recorded by the Foundations, for whom it charted in the UK.

The Paper Dolls released one album, titled Paper Dolls House in 1968, which was re-issued with bonus tracks on CD in 2001. The first release included a cover of the Beach Boys' song "Darlin'"; the later version substituted a cover of the Paul McCartney song "Step Inside Love".

In 1970, they signed to RCA. Two further singles, a cover of the Angels' "My Boyfriend's Back" and the original song "Remember December" (featuring backing vocals by Brian Connolly – later of Sweet) did not chart, and the trio split up.

In 2026, they re-surfaced unexpectedly, performing "My Life (Is in Your Hands)", in a recently rediscovered 1968 episode of the Morecambe and Wise show, which was broadcast on BBC Four to mark the centenary of the birth of comedian Eric Morecambe.

== After the split ==
- In 1978, billed as Tiger Sue, Mathis released a solo single of the song "When You Walk in the Room".
- Mathis was a vocal coach for the St Winifred's School Choir, whose single "There's No-one Quite Like Grandma" was a Christmas number one in 1980.
- Mathis became a local radio presenter, appearing on Piccadilly Radio and BBC Radio Manchester.
- Mathis became a fundraising co-ordinator for the "Kirsty Appeal" on behalf of the Francis House Children's Hospice in Didsbury, Manchester, and was involved with various other cancer charities. She was diagnosed with breast cancer in 2004.

== Personnel ==
- Tiger – born Susanne Mathis, 29 April 1947, South London
- Copper – born Susan Marshall, 21 April 1948, Nottingham, Nottinghamshire
- Spyder – born Pauline Bennett, 28 July 1948, Bletchley, Buckinghamshire

== Discography ==
Singles
Title	Release info	Year	Notes
"Something Here in My Heart (Keeps a Tellin' Me No)" / "All the Time in the World"	Pye 7N 17456	1968	UK number 11
"My Life (Is in Your Hands)" / "There's Nobody I'd Sooner Love"	Pye 7N 17547	1968	
"Someday" / "Any Old Time (You're Lonely and Sad)"	Pye 7N 17655	1968	
"My Boyfriend's Back" / "Mister Good Time Friday"	RCA Victor RCA 1919	1970	
"Remember December" / "Same Old Story"	RCA Victor RCA 2007	1970	
"Sad Sweet Dreamer" / "Something Here in My Heart (Keeps a Telling Me No)"	Flash Backs Pye / PRT FBS 20	1983	Track A is by Sweet Sensation Track B is by The Paper Dolls
"That Same Old Feeling" / "Something Here in My Heart (Keeps a-Tellin' Me No)"	Old Gold OG 9470	1985	Track A is by Pickettywitch; Track B is by the Paper Dolls
