= Les Reed (songwriter) =

British songwriter

Les Reed OBE
- Born: Leslie David Reed; 24 July 1935; Woking, Surrey, England
- Died: 15 April 2019 (aged 83) Petersfield, Hampshire
- Genres: Popular music; classical
- Occupations: Songwriter, arranger, musician, orchestra leader
- Years active: 1959–2019

Leslie David Reed OBE (24 July 1935 – 15 April 2019) was an English songwriter, arranger, musician and light-orchestra leader. His major songwriting partners were Gordon Mills, Barry Mason, and Geoff Stephens, although he wrote songs with many others such as Roger Greenaway, Roger Cook, Peter Callander, and Johnny Worth.

Reed co-wrote around sixty charting songs, and is best known for "It's Not Unusual", "Delilah", "The Last Waltz", "Kiss Me Goodbye," "There's a Kind of Hush," and "Marching On Together". His songs gained a number of Gold discs and Ivor Novello Awards. AllMusic noted that "In the mid-1960s, it was unusual for a British singles chart not to list a Les Reed song". He won the British Academy Gold Badge of Merit in 1982.

== Early life ==
Reed was born and grew up in Woking, Surrey. He was an accomplished musician by the age of 14, playing the piano, accordion and vibraphone. He studied at the London College of Music before joining the Willis Reed Group, with whom he toured for four years. Having been called up for National Service, he played piano and clarinet in the Royal East Kent Military Band. In 1959, he joined The John Barry Seven as their pianist.

== Songwriting career ==
In the mid-1960s, Reed began a successful songwriting partnership with Geoff Stephens which yielded such hits as "Tell Me When", a hit for The Applejacks; "Here It Comes Again" for The Fortunes; "Leave A Little Love" for Lulu; and "There's a Kind of Hush", a 1967 success for Herman's Hermits. During 1964, Reed penned "It's Not Unusual" with ex-Viscounts member and Tom Jones' manager Gordon Mills, which was Jones' debut recording and gave him a UK number one. Reed also arranged the song and played the piano for the recording.

Around this time, Reed struck up a songwriting partnership with Barry Mason. They wrote a song for Kathy Kirby, "I'll Try Not To Cry", as Britain's entry in 1965 for the Eurovision Song Contest held in Naples. The song was beaten by "I Belong". The songwriters had a 1967 hit in "Everybody Knows" by The Dave Clark Five—who also recorded a Reed–Mason follow-up—and another success in 1968 with "Delilah", again a Top 10 hit for Tom Jones. "Delilah" was originally written for P. J. Proby, and later covered by The Sensational Alex Harvey Band in 1975. Reed and Mason also wrote "The Last Waltz", which became a million selling UK number one for Engelbert Humperdinck in September 1967.

Mason and Reed wrote "Who's Doctor Who?", a novelty song recorded by Doctor Who star Frazer Hines in 1967, but it failed to chart. In 1968, the duo scored another UK number one hit with Des O'Connor's recording of "I Pretend". That same year, "I've Got My Eyes on You", written by Reed and Jackie Rae, was recorded by Petula Clark, Ray Conniff, P. J. Proby and The Vogues. Following Petula Clark's original version, Connie Francis recorded "Kiss Me Goodbye" on her album Connie Francis Sings the Songs of Les Reed, which featured Reed as producer and pianist; the album was released in November 1969.

In 1970, Reed's orchestra recorded "Man of Action" which was used as the theme tune for Radio North Sea International until 1974. In 1971, "When There's No You" by Reed and Jackie Rae was recorded by Engelbert Humperdinck and became Humperdinck's second of four number ones on the US easy-listening chart, reaching number one in April 1971. In 1972, he co-wrote Leeds United F.C.'s anthem "Marching On Together".

At the 1973 Tokyo Music Festival, Reed and Stephens won the Silver Star for "Sandy Sandy", whilst in 1977 Reed and Tony Macaulay triumphed at the International Song Contest in Mallorca with "You and I". Reed and Roger Greenaway were awarded the Grand Prix Award in Seoul for "Everytime You Go". Reed's songs have been recorded by Elvis Presley ("Girl of Mine", "Sylvia" and "This Is Our Dance"), Shirley Bassey ("Does Anybody Miss Me") and Bing Crosby ("That's What Life Is All About"). Reed's film score composition credits include those for The Girl on a Motorcycle (1968), The Bushbaby (1969), One More Time (1970), George and Mildred (1980), Creepshow 2 (1987) and Parting Shots (1999).

Reed composed music for stage-musical productions including The Magic Show (1974), American Heroes and And Then I Wrote. In 1994, Reed produced an album for Max Bygraves to raise money for the Lest We Forget Association. Reed co-composed, with Roger Cook, the score for the 2004 musical Beautiful and Damned, based on the lives of Zelda and F. Scott Fitzgerald.

== Awards and honours ==
His songs gained a number of Gold discs for high sales, and Ivor Novello Awards for artistic merit. Reed won the British Academy Gold Badge of Merit in 1982. He was honoured as a Freeman of the City of London for his contributions to the music industry. In the 1998 Birthday Honours, Reed was appointed an Officer of the Order of the British Empire.

== Chart hits and other notable songs written by Reed ==
Year	Song	Original artist	Co-writer(s) with Reed	^{U.S. Pop}	^{UK Singles Chart}	Other charting versions, and notes
1964	"Tell Me When"	The Applejacks	Geoff Stephens	-	7	
1964	"Everybody Knows"	Steve Lawrence	Jimmy Duncan	72	-	
1965	"It's Not Unusual"	Tom Jones	Gordon Mills	10	1	1987: Tom Jones (reissue), number 17 UK; 2011: The Glee Cast, number 65 US, number 99 UK
1965	"Leave a Little Love"	Lulu	Robin Conrad	-	8	
1965	"Here It Comes Again"	The Fortunes	Barry Mason	27	4	
1965	"Don't Bring Me Your Heartaches"	Paul and Barry Ryan	Robin Conrad	-	13	
1966	"Have Pity on the Boy"	Paul and Barry Ryan	Barry Mason	-	18	
1966	"To Make a Big Man Cry"	P. J. Proby	Peter Callander	-	34	1966: Roy Head, number 95 US
1967	"There's a Kind of Hush"	Herman's Hermits	Geoff Stephens	4	7	1976: The Carpenters, number 12 US, number 22 UK
1967	"Claire"	Paul and Barry Ryan	Geoff Stephens	-	47	
1967	"The Last Waltz"	Engelbert Humperdinck	Barry Mason	25	1	1967: Mireille Mathieu, "La Derniere Valse" (lyrics by Hubert Ithier), number 26 UK
1967	"Everybody Knows"	The Dave Clark Five	Barry Mason	43	2	
1967	"I'm Coming Home"	Tom Jones	Barry Mason	57	2	
1968	"Kiss Me Goodbye"	Petula Clark	Barry Mason	15	50	
1968	"Delilah"	Tom Jones	Barry Mason	15	2	1975: The Sensational Alex Harvey Band, number 7 UK; 1992: Tom Jones (reissue), number 68 UK
1968	"No One Can Break a Heart Like You"	The Dave Clark Five	Jackie Rae	-	28	
1968	"It's Your Day Today"	P. J. Proby	Barry Mason	-	32	
1968	"When We Were Young"	Solomon King	Barry Mason	-	21	
1968	"I Pretend"	Des O'Connor	Barry Mason	-	1	
1968	"Les Bicyclettes de Belsize"	Les Vandyke	Barry Mason	-	-	1968: Engelbert Humperdinck, number 31 US, number 5 UK
1968	"Please Don't Go"	Donald Peers	Jackie Rae	-	3	
1969	"Tears Won't Wash Away These Heartaches"	Ken Dodd	Geoff Stephens	-	22	
1969	"Winter World of Love"	Engelbert Humperdinck	Barry Mason	16	7	
1969	"Love Is All"	Malcolm Roberts	Barry Mason	-	12	1973: Engelbert Humperdinck, number 91 US, number 44 UK
1970	"Daughter of Darkness"	Tom Jones	Geoff Stephens	13	5	
1970	"Baby I Won't Let You Down"	Pickettywitch	Geoff Stephens	-	27	
1971	"When There's No You"	Engelbert Humperdinck	Jackie Rae	-	45	
1972	"Sally Sunshine"	The Mills Brothers	Geoff Stephens	-	-	1972: Leeds United F.C., "Leeds United" (with rewritten lyrics), number 10 UK
1972	"Give Me One More Chance "	Donald Peers	Peter Dacre	-	36	
1972	"I Never Said Goodbye"	Engelbert Humperdinck	Barry Mason	61	-	
1973	"24 Sycamore"	Gene Pitney	Barry Mason	-	34	
1973	"Remember"	Des O'Connor	Barry Mason	-	51	
1976	"Hello Happiness"	The Drifters	Roger Greenaway	-	12	
1980	"It's Only Paper That's Burning"	Rick and Bonnie Diamond	Peter Callander	-	-	
1983	"County Down"	Brendan Shine	Terry Dempsey	-	78	
1983	"My Son"	J. J. Barrie	Malcolm Roberts	-	96	
2010	"Leeds! Leeds! Leeds! (Marching On Together)"	Leeds United F.C.	Barry Mason	-	10	

== Recordings ==
Reed also conducted his own band, The Les Reed Orchestra, and was billed under various names. His orchestra's recordings included:

- 1962 - "Dr. Finlay's Casebook (March From "A Little Suite")" – The Les Reed Strings (September 1962, Piccadilly Records, 7N.35080)
- 1963 - "Minuet Mash/Nightfall" – The Les Reed Piano (January 1963, (Piccadilly Records, 7N.35097)
- 1963 - "On the Scene/High Society" – The Les Reed Piano (May 1963, (Piccadilly Records, 7N.35122)
- 1964 - "Spanish Armada/Madrid" – The Les Reed Combo (March 1964, (Fontana Records, TF455)
- 1964 - "Little Leprechaun/Come Take My Hand" – Les Reed Orchestra (November 1964, (Fontana Records, H496)
- 1965 - "Poor Little Rich Girl/High Bright Sun" – Les Reed Orchestra (February 1965, (Fontana Records, TF545)
- 1965 - "Hot Line/Ten Feet Tall" – Les Reed Orchestra (May 1965, Fontana, TF576)
- 1966 - "Good Kings Went Ridiculous/Valley Of The Kings" – Les Reed Orchestra (November 1966, (Fontana Records, TF765)
- 1967 - "Imogene/The Pay Off 28" – Les Reed Orchestra (Deram Records, DMA-1013)
- 1967 - "Copacabana Girl/Imogene" (Deram Records, 85010)
- 1967 - "Fly Me To The Sun" (Deram Records, SML 1008)
- 1967 - "New Dimensions" (Deram Records, DML 709) as The Les Reed Sound
- 1968 - "Theme From 'Candice'/The Last Waltz" – Les Reed Orchestra (DMA-1019)
- 1969 - "Love Is All" (London Records, SP 44136), with The Eddie Lester Singers
- 1969 - "Big Drum/Don't Linger With Your Finger on the Trigger" (Deram Records, 7525)
- 1970 - "Man of Action/Madrid" Chapter 1, CH 126
- 1971 - "The hit making world of Les Reed" (Decca Records, SPA 386)
- 1973 - "Man of Action" (Decca Records, 6835 122)
- 1974 - "Slaughter on Tenth Avenue/The Hawk" – Les Reed Orchestra (Bell Records, BELL1342)

== Personal life ==
He was married to June, who predeceased him; the couple had a daughter.
