= Baby Make It Soon =

1969 song by The Marmalade

Single by The Marmalade
- B-side: "Time Is on My Side"
- Released: June 1969
- Genre: Pop
- Label: CBS Records
- Songwriter: Tony Macaulay
- Producer: Mike Smith

The Marmalade singles chronology
"Ob-La-Di, Ob-La-Da" (1968)	"Baby Make It Soon" (1969)	"Reflections of My Life" (1969)

"Baby Make It Soon"

Single by The Flying Machine
- B-side: "There She Goes"
- Released: February 1970
- Genre: Pop
- Label: Congress Records
- Songwriter: Tony Macaulay
- Producer: John Macleod

The Flying Machine singles chronology
"Smile a Little Smile for Me" (1969)	"Baby Make It Soon" (1970)

"Baby Make It Soon" is a 1969 song by The Marmalade. It was written by Tony Macaulay. The song reached number nine in the UK and number 3 in South Africa.

== Chart history ==
=== Weekly charts ===
Chart (1969)	Peak position
Norway (VG-Lista)	10
South Africa (Springbok)	3
UK (The Official Charts Company)	9

=== Year-end charts ===
Chart (1969)	Rank
UK	77

== The Flying Machine cover ==
"Baby Make It Soon" was covered by The Flying Machine in 1970. It charted in the US, reaching number 87.

=== Chart history ===
Chart (1970)	Peak position
US Billboard Hot 100	87
US Cash Box Top 100	97
