= Susie Mathis =

English former singer (born 1947)

- Also known as: Tiger, Tiger Sue
- Born: Susan Mathis; 29 April 1947 (age 79); South London, England
- Genres: Pop
- Occupations: Singer, radio show host, actress
- Labels: Pinnacle, Maple Annie

Susie Mathis (born Susan Mathis; 29 April 1947) is a former singer and radio presenter who, in later years, became a fundraiser for Francis House Children's Hospice, and several other charities in North West England.

== Music and television career ==
Mathis first appeared in the West End at the age of fifteen and came to fame in March 1968, using the stage name 'Tiger', as the lead singer of the Paper Dolls. They reached number 11 in the UK Singles Chart with "Something Here in My Heart (Keeps A Tellin' Me No)", appearing on Top Of The Pops. Mathis also released three solo singles under the name 'Tiger Sue'.

== Radio and television ==
Mathis joined the local Manchester independent radio station, Piccadilly Radio in 1979, and in 1981 became the first female daytime presenter on independent radio in the UK. She later joined BBC Radio Manchester and twice won the Sony Radio Personality of the Year Award.

In 1988, Mathis co-hosted an edition of "Top of the Pops" alongside Gary Davies, then again in 1989, alongside Bruno Brookes.

In 2021, Mathis appeared alongside other guests, such as Paul Gambaccini and David Grant on Channel 5's year-by-year pop music countdown series Britain's Biggest 70s Hits, and in 2022 was seen on the channel's subsequent Friday night music series 80s Greatest Pop Videos.

== Charity work ==
Mathis worked as a fundraiser for Francis House, a children's hospice in Manchester, helping to raise £5 million for the cause. Mathis herself was diagnosed with breast cancer in 2004. As part of the fundraising effort, the 1975 formation of the Paper Dolls reformed for a one-off concert in Bradford in March 2008. Mathis had worked with Kirsty Howard, a 12-year-old fundraiser, who for the night became the Paper Dolls' unofficial fourth member when she sang with them on stage.

== Solo discography ==
=== As Tiger Sue ===
Singles
Title	Release info	Year	Notes
"Burn, Burn, Burn" / "Tease Me"	Maple Annie MA 101	1971	
"Kickaway My Blues (Tuck Away My Lonesome Blues)" / "If There Is No Love in Your Heart"	Pinnacle P 8447	1977	
"When You Walked in the Room" / "Human Being Someone"	Pinnacle P 8456	1978	
