= Smile a Little Smile for Me =

Single by The Flying Machine

from the album The Flying Machine
- B-side: "Maybe We've Been Loving Too Long"
- Released: April 11, 1969 (UK); June 1969 (US)
- Genre: Bubblegum; pop rock; soft rock; sunshine pop; pop
- Length: 2:55
- Label: Pye (UK); Congress (US)
- Songwriters: Geoff Stephens; Tony Macaulay
- Producer: Tony Macaulay

The Flying Machine singles chronology
"Smile a Little Smile for Me" (1969)	"Baby Make It Soon" (1970)

Music video
- "Smile a Little Smile for Me" on YouTube

"Smile a Little Smile for Me" is the debut single by the Flying Machine. The song was written by Geoff Stephens and Tony Macaulay.

== Lyrical content ==
The song concerns a woman having difficulty coming to terms with the final ending of a rocky relationship with a man she loved. The singer encourages "Rosemarie" to smile in spite of her pain and tears, because she will soon see that her prospects for a future relationship are bright.

== Chart history ==
It reached No. 5 in the U.S. during the fall of 1969. It also hit No. 6 on the Adult Contemporary chart. "Smile a Little Smile for Me" was a bigger hit in Canada. It reached No. 4 on the pop singles chart and No. 6 AC.

=== Weekly charts ===
Chart (1969–1970)	Peak position
Australia (Kent Music Report)	51
Canadian RPM Top Singles	4
Canadian RPM Adult Contemporary	6
South Africa (Springbok)	18
US Billboard Hot 100	5
US Billboard Adult Contemporary	6
US Cash Box Top 100	5

=== Year-end charts ===
Chart (1969)	Rank
Canada RPM Top Singles	64
US Billboard Hot 100	76
US Cash Box	68
