= Baby Take Me in Your Arms =

Single by Jefferson

from the album The Colour Of My Love
- B-side: "I Fell Flat on My Face"
- Released: 22 August 1969
- Recorded: 1969
- Genre: Pop
- Label: Janus
- Songwriters: Tony Macaulay, John Macleod
- Producer: John Schroeder

Jefferson singles chronology
"The Colour of My Love" (1969)	"Baby Take Me in Your Arms" (1969)

"Baby Take Me in Your Arms" is a 1968 song composed by Tony Macaulay and John Macleod.

The most famous recording of the song was by Jefferson in late 1969. Jefferson's version became a Top 40 pop and adult contemporary hit during the winter of 1970 in the U.S. and Canada. Although the artist, Geoffrey Turton, is British and the LP was released in the UK, the single was not. "Baby Take Me in Your Arms" went to No. 12 on WABC-AM in New York City.

== Chart history ==
=== Weekly charts ===
Chart (1969–70)	Peak position
Canadian RPM Top Singles	15
Canadian RPM Adult Contemporary	14
US Billboard Hot 100	23
US Billboard Adult Contemporary	19
US Cash Box Top 100	19
US Record World Top 100	19

== Other versions ==
- The Paper Dolls recorded the song in 1968, before Jefferson's version, on their album, Paper Dolls House. It was not released as a single.
- Bobby Vinton covered "Baby Take Me in Your Arms" on his 1970 LP My Elusive Dreams.
- Under the truncated title "Take Me in Your Arms," Edison Lighthouse included it on their 1971 LP, Already.

== See also ==
- List of 1970s one-hit wonders in the United States
