= Something Here in My Heart (Keeps a Tellin' Me No) =

Single by The Paper Dolls
- B-side: "All the Time in the World"
- Released: February 23, 1968
- Genre: Pop
- Label: PYE 7N 17456
- Composers: MacLeod, Macaulay
- Producer: Tony Macaulay

The Paper Dolls singles chronology
| "Something Here in My Heart (Keeps a Tellin' Me No)" (1968) | "My Life (Is in Your Hands)" (1968) |

"Something Here in My Heart (Keeps a Tellin' Me No)" is a song by the Paper Dolls. It was a top 20 hit on the UK Singles Chart in 1968.

== Background ==
The song was composed by MacLeod and Tony Macaulay, the songwriting duo who also wrote songs for Pickettywitch, the Flying Machine, Long John Baldry and the Foundations.

It was first released on PYE 7N 17456 on February 23, 1968.

== Chart history ==
The song peaked at number 11 on the UK Singles Chart, spending 13 weeks on the listing. It also reached number 12 on the New Zealand Listener chart.
