= The Trade Winds =

American pop group from Providence, Rhode Island

The Trade Winds was an American pop group formed in Providence, Rhode Island. The group's members were singer-songwriter and record producer Peter Anders (né Peter Andreoli) (April 28, 1941 – March 24, 2016) and Vini Poncia, who previously had a hit single (with a third member, Norman Marzano) under the name "The Videls" with a song titled "Mr. Lonely", which hit #73 on the U.S. Billboard Hot 100 chart in 1960.

After a few further single releases, The Videls folded. Anders and Poncia began writing tunes with Phil Spector for groups such as The Lovelites (whose lead singer Joanna DeClemente later became Poncia's second wife), the Ronettes and the Crystals. Recording under the name "The Trade Winds" in 1965, they released several singles and scored two more U.S. hits, "New York's a Lonely Town" (#32, 1965) and the psychedelic-tinged "Mind Excursion" (#51, 1966), along with two other songs that bubbled under the U.S. charts, "The Girl From Greenwich Village" at number 129, and "Catch Me in the Meadow" at number 132. In 1966, they changed their name to "The Innocence", recorded a full-length eponymous album, and had two further hit singles, "There's Got to Be a Word!" (U.S. #34, 1966) and "Mairzy Doats" (U.S. #75, 1967). Following the LP release, the duo released another album under the name Anders & Poncia on Warner Bros. Records in 1969, and shortly after broke up.

Together with Jerry Ross, Anders and Poncia wrote "You Gave Me Somebody to Love" for the Dreamlovers. Poncia later went on to produce material for artists such as Ringo Starr, Melissa Manchester, and Kiss.

The group was mentioned in the Mad Men Season 5 episode "Tea Leaves" where Harry accidentally signed them instead of The Rolling Stones for a Heinz commercial.

Anders died at Kent Hospital in Warwick, Rhode Island, on March 24, 2016, at age 74.
