= Let the Heartaches Begin =

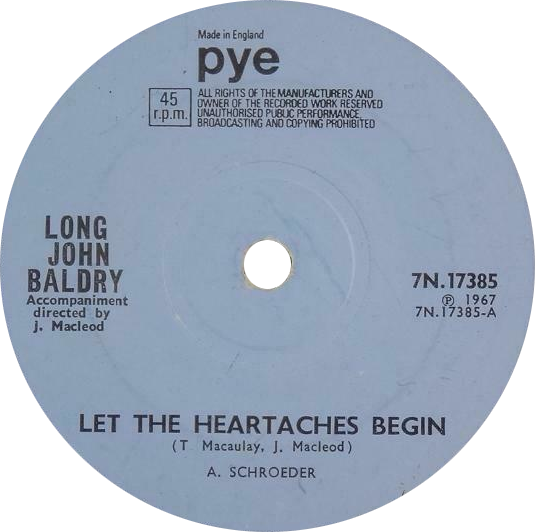
- One of label variants of the 1960s UK single

Single by Long John Baldry
- B-side: "Annabella (Who Flies To Me When She's Lonely)"
- Released: 1967
- Recorded: Pye Studios, London, England
- Genre: Pop
- Label: Pye Records 7N 17385
- Songwriters: Tony Macaulay; John Macleod
- Producer: John McLeod

"Let the Heartaches Begin" is a song performed by British singer Long John Baldry. The single was a number one hit in the UK Singles Chart on 22 November 1967 where it stayed for two weeks. It was the second of two consecutive UK number one hits for the writing partnership of Tony Macaulay and John Macleod. The title of the B-side song is "Annabella (Who Flies To Me When She's Lonely)".

== Composition and recording ==
An early version of the song was written by Tony Macaulay a few years before it was recorded by Long John Baldry. Baldry was originally a blues singer, but he did not have much chart success for ten years. In 1967 he moved from United Artists to Pye Records to pursue a more pop-oriented recording career. Macaulay was tasked with writing songs for him by Pye managing director Louis Benjamin.

Macaulay met with Baldry to write the songs. Their initial attempt at writing failed to produce a satisfactory song until Macaulay remembered "Let the Heartaches Begin" that he had previously written. While they were writing the song, they were joined by John Macleod, who had just written with Macaulay a hit song "Baby Now That I've Found You" for The Foundations. McLeod wrote the second verse, as well as adding a chord or two. Macaulay was not certain that the song could be successful, and he credited Macleod's input including his orchestration for turning the song into one that became a hit.

The song was recorded first with a live orchestra, with orchestral arrangement by Macleod. Baldry then added the vocal, although as a bluesman he was not used to singing the notes exactly as written on the bar line. He drank brandy copiously while he was recording the vocal, which contributed to the seemingly emotional quality of the sound. Macaulay said of the recording session: "Long John Baldry sings it extraordinarily well, thanks to three-quarters of a bottle of Courvoisier". The song was mixed five times in one day.

== Chart performance ==
The song reached top 10 the second week it was released, and on November 22, 1967, it reached No. 1 after Baldry appeared on Top of the Pops, replacing as No. 1 "Baby Now That I've Found You" that was also written by Macaulay and Macleod. The song also charted in the United States, peaking at No. 88 on the Billboard Hot 100 the week of 20 January 1968, and in the Republic of Ireland, where the song reached No. 2 in the charts.

== Charts ==
Chart (1967–1968)	Peak position
Australia (Go-Set)	14
Ireland (IRMA)	2
New Zealand (Listener)	20
UK Singles (OCC)	1
US Billboard Hot 100	88
