= Declan Galbraith =

English musician (born 1991)

- Galbraith in 2007

Background information
- Also known as: Child of Mind
- Born: Declan John Galbraith; 19 December 1991 (age 34); Hoo St Werburgh, Kent, England
- Genres: Pop; rock; folk-rock; rock-electronic; ballad
- Occupations: Singer; songwriter
- Instruments: Vocals; guitar; piano
- Years active: 2002–2008, 2012–present

Declan John Galbraith (born 19 December 1991) is a British singer and songwriter. He became known in 2002 with the release of the single "Tell Me Why", which peaked at number 29 on the UK Singles Chart and helped break the Guinness World Record for the world's largest simultaneous sing-along. Galbraith later found success in Europe and China, where his music was used in schools to support English language learning. Since 2017, he has released music independently under the stage name Child of Mind.

== Early life ==
Declan Galbraith was born on 19 December 1991 in Hoo St Werburgh, Kent, England, to parents Alec and Siobhan. His grandfather, to whom his first album was later dedicated, died in 1996 while performing on stage. Galbraith's first performance occurred at his grandmother's 60th birthday party, where he sang the traditional song, "Tell Me Ma". He was discovered by songwriter Barry Mason, who introduced him to publicist Max Clifford. Galbraith subsequently signed a three-album deal with EMI Records, reportedly worth £1 million.

== Musical career ==
Galbraith's first professional recording was a rendition of "Walking in the Air", released on a Christmas compilation album. In 2002, at the age of ten, he released his self-titled debut album, Declan, which included a mix of traditional songs - "Danny Boy" and "Amazing Grace" - covers of contemporary tracks "Angels" and "Imagine", along with original material.

His debut single, "Tell Me Why", reached number 29 on the UK Singles Chart and gained attention for both its message of peace and the large-scale sing-along campaign it inspired. During the 2002 Young Voices tour, Galbraith performed in Belfast alongside 4,000 children. The event connected with 100,000 children across the UK, setting the Guinness World Record for the largest simultaneous sing-along.

Galbraith performed at a concert headlined by Elton John at Hull Football Stadium and carried the Jubilee flame into St. Paul's Cathedral with Atomic Kitten, singing "Amazing Grace" for 1,500 attendees. He signed a deal with Saban Music Group and later a contract with Starwatch Music, a label under ProSiebenSat.1 Media in Germany, distributed by Warner Music.

In December 2006, Galbraith released his second studio album, Thank You, produced by German hitmaker Ully Jonas.

A third studio album, You and Me, followed in November 2007, again released under Starwatch Entertainment. The album featured covers of "Nothing Else Matters" by Metallica, "The Living Years" by Mike + The Mechanics, and "Ruby Tuesday" by the Rolling Stones.

In 2017, Galbraith rebranded as Child of Mind, an artistic project centered on self-written, independently released music.

== Discography ==
=== Albums ===
As Declan Galbraith

- Declan (2003) UK #44
- Thank You (2006) GER # 5
- You and Me (2007) GER # 33

As Child of Mind

- Live in Shenzhen 2017 (2017)
- From Castle Röhrsdorf (2018)

=== Singles ===
- "Tell Me Why" (2002) UK #29
- "Love of My Life" (2007) GER # 55
- "Ego You" (2007)

== Influence ==
In 2007, singer-songwriter Troye Sivan's first YouTube video was an a cappella cover of Galbraith's "Tell Me Why". The caption read: “This is a GREAT song and I know it means a heck of a lot to me as I’m sure it does to a lot of you as well.”
