= Judy Valentine =

American actress (1923–2022)

- Born: Norma Baker; May 15, 1923; Boston, Massachusetts, U.S.
- Died: August 26, 2022 (aged 99); Lynnfield, Massachusetts, U.S.
- Occupations: Singer, actress

Judy Valentine (May 15, 1923 – August 26, 2022) was an American singer and children's television actress.

== Life and career ==
The daughter of Robert and Lena Baker, Judy began performing while still a teenager and a student at Lowell High School, singing professionally in local Boston-area nightclubs. At age 22, in 1945, Valentine married songwriter and disc-jockey Sherm Feller; she had been a performer on his radio program, and he subsequently assumed an active role in promoting her career. Their marriage ultimately ended in divorce, and Judy remarried, circa 1961. Her second husband, Leonard Berkal, died in 2010.

Valentine's recordings of the 1940s and 1950s, delivered in her characteristic childlike soprano, include "She Was Five and He Was Ten," "I'm a Little Teapot", and "Kiss Me Sweet".

Valentine then co-hosted the short-lived Judy and Goggle Show on Boston TV station WHDH-TV. Goggle was a puppet operated by Caroll Spinney, who went on to play Big Bird and Oscar the Grouch on Sesame Street for nearly 50 years. Valentine and Spinney were then hired in the late 1960s by the Boston Bozo the Clown show, which was syndicated to other cities including New York City, Los Angeles, and Washington, D.C. Valentine appeared as Spinney's assistant, and sang. Valentine also made guest appearances on Captain Kangaroo as The Dancing Doll and Bixter the Leprechaun.

Valentine was also known for her singing of the radio jingle for Adams and Swett, "How many cookies did Andrew eat? Andrew ate eight thousand. How do you keep your carpets clean? Call ANdrew-8-8000", which ran for decades on Boston radio.

Valentine died in Lynnfield, Massachusetts on August 26, 2022, at the age of 99.

== Discography ==
=== Albums ===
- Mother Goose Nursery Rhymes – Judy Valentine and the Children's Singing Chorus (MGM CH 504, CHS 504)
- Favorites, Volume 1

=== EPs ===
- Song Hits From Walt Disney's 'Peter Pan' – Hugo Winterhalter and his Orchestra with Stuart Foster and Judy Valentine (1952, RCA Victor E2PW-1015, E2PW-1016 (EPA 407))
- Song Hits From Walt Disney's 'Hans Christian Andersen' – Hugo Winterhalter and his Orchestra with Stuart Foster and Judy Valentine (1952, RCA Victor E2PW-1017, E2PW-1018)

=== Singles ===
- "She Was Five And He Was Ten" (1953, Epic 9004)
- "Bibbidi – Bobbidi – Boo" (1957, ABC-Paramount 45-9794)
- "Nature Boy" (Tee-Vee Records 103)

== Further listening ==
- Harriet Tramer, Judy Valentine (July 18, 2018). Harriet Tramer interviews Judy Valentine (MPEG3 audio). Aging Without Wrinkles by Artists First.
