= I'm a Little Teapot =

- Sheet music cover

Song by George Harry Sanders and Clarence Kelley
- Released: 1939
- Genre: Children's music
- Label: Kelman Music Corporation
- Songwriters: George Harry Sanders and Clarence Kelley

"I'm a Little Teapot" is an American nursery rhyme and novelty song describing the heating and pouring of a teapot or a whistling tea kettle. The song was originally written by George Harry Sanders and Clarence Z. Kelley and published in 1939. By 1941, a Newsweek article referred to the song as "the next inane novelty song to sweep the country".

== Creation ==
Kelley and his wife ran a dance school for children, which taught the "Waltz Clog", a popular and easy-to-learn tap dance routine. This routine, however, proved too difficult for the younger students to master. To solve this problem, George Sanders wrote "The Teapot Song", which required minimal skill and encouraged natural pantomime. Both the song and its accompanying dance, the "Teapot Tip", became enormously popular in America and overseas.

The song was recorded and made famous by Art Kassel and His Kassels in the Air orchestra with featured vocalist Marion Holmes singing the tune. It was published in 1941 by Bluebird Records. (Marion Holmes soon after married Broadway, film, and TV star Don DeFore.)

The lyrics begin "I'm a little teapot, short and stout..." and go on to further describe the appearance and actions of the singer-as-teapot. The song may be accompanied with actions: extending one arm in a curve like the spout, placing the other arm like the handle, and bending sideways to pour.

A piano recording of "I'm a Little Teapot", in which the vocals are played by the higher melody

== Recordings ==
"I'm a Little Teapot" has been recorded by a number of artists, particularly on children's albums. It's been released as a single by various artists besides Kassel, including Horace Heidt (1941), Lawrence Duchow's Red Raven Orchestra (1956), Judy Valentine, and Two Ton Baker (1947). It's included on Leonard Bernstein's 1973 album Prokofiev's Peter and the Wolf plus 10 More Great Children's Favorites.

== In popular culture ==
The song is played extensively in the 1999 horror film miniseries Storm of the Century.

In the episode "Pavlov's Mice" of Pinky and the Brain, Brain sings the song itself.

In the episode "It Was Supposed to Be Funny" of Home Movies (TV series), Brendon makes Melissa's grandfather sing the song.

== See also ==
- American tea culture
- Tea for Two (song), an earlier North American song referring to tea, from 1925
- Hyper Text Coffee Pot Control Protocol
