= The Jamies =

American singing group

The Jamies were an American singing group, led by siblings Tom and Serena Jameson, based in Boston. They are best known for the song "Summertime, Summertime."

== Career ==
"Summertime, Summertime," the group's 1958 single for Epic Records, reached #26 on the US Billboard Hot 100.

Both "Summertime" and its b-side, "Searching for You", are often described as doo-wop because of their time period and their a cappella harmonies.

Several singles followed "Summertime, Summertime" (many written by Tom Jameson), but none of these were hits. In 1962, "Summertime, Summertime" was re-released and became a hit again, this time peaking at No. 38.

The song's fame far eclipsed the band's; The Fortunes, the Doodletown Pipers, Hobby Horse, Jan and Dean, and Sha Na Na all covered the tune, and it was used in commercials for Buick, Ken-L Ration Burger Time Dog Food, Applebee's and McDonald's. It was also featured in the 1978 film Fingers.

Tom Jameson died from cancer on July 19, 2009, at the age of 72. Arthur Blair died at age 82 on January 8, 2020, in Fruitland, Idaho.

== Members ==
- Thomas Earl "Tom" Jameson (1937–2009)
- Serena Jameson (Thomas Jameson's sister, who sang alto)
- Jeannie Roy (1938-2025)
- Arthur Blair (1937–2020)
- Sherman Feller (1918–1994) (Group manager, later became more famous as the public address announcer for the Boston Red Sox at Fenway Park.) He did not co-write "Summertime, Summertime", as is commonly thought, but took co-writing credit, half of the songwriting royalties, and the publishing rights, as was common practice by managers at the time. (See external links below.) Tom Jameson was the sole writer/arranger of "Summertime, Summertime."

== Singles ==
- "Summertime, Summertime" b/w "Searching for You" (Epic Records, 1958 single 9281 10-inch 78 rpm; 5-9281 7-inch 45 rpm) - US No. 26
- "Snow Train" b/w "When the Sun Goes Down" (Epic, 1958)
- "Don't Darken My Door" b/w "Evening Star" (United Artists, 1959)
- "Summertime, Summertime" reissue (1962) - US No. 38
