= Thank You (Declan Galbraith album) =

Studio album by Declan Galbraith
- Released: 1 December 2006
- Studio: Push Music Studios, Bognor Regis, England and Sound Studio, Cologne, Germany
- Genre: Pop
- Length: 53:36
- Label: Starwatch Music
- Producer: Pat Anthony, Al King

Declan Galbraith chronology
Declan (2002)	Thank You (2006)	You and Me (2007)

Thank You is the second studio album by English singer Declan Galbraith. It was released on 1 December 2006 in Germany by Starwatch Music.

It is Galbraith's second album, a compilation of covers of classic songs assembled and sung by Galbraith.

== Track listing ==
1. "An Angel" (The Kelly Family) – 3:44
2. "Love of My Life" (Freddie Mercury "Queen") – 2:36
3. "Nights in White Satin" (The Moody Blues) – 3:47
4. "Tears in Heaven" (Eric Clapton) – 4:27
5. "Bright Eyes" (Art Garfunkel) – 3:51
6. "House of the Rising Sun" (The Animals) – 3:18
7. "Saved by the Bell" (Robin Gibb) – 3:22
8. "David's Song (Who'll Come with Me)" (The Kelly Family) – 3:19
9. "All Out of Love" (Air Supply)– 3:42
10. "How Could an Angel Break My Heart?" (Toni Braxton) – 4:17
11. "Vincent (Starry, Starry Night)" (Don McLean)– 4:03
12. "Only One Woman" (The Marbles) – 3:11
13. "The Last Unicorn" (America) – 3:27
14. "Sailing" (Gavin Sutherland) – 4:25
15. "Where Did Our Love Go" (The Supremes) – 2:19
16. "World [iTunes and USA edition Bonus Track]" (the Bee Gees) – 3:33

== Charts ==
=== Weekly charts ===
Chart (2007)	Peak position
Austrian Albums (Ö3 Austria)	18
German Albums (Offizielle Top 100)	5
Swiss Albums (Schweizer Hitparade)	38

=== Year-end charts ===
Chart (2007)	Position
German Albums (Offizielle Top 100)	53

== Singles ==
- "Love of My Life" Released on 23 March 2007.
