= Fingers (1978 film) =

1978 film by James Toback

- Theatrical poster
- Directed by: James Toback
- Written by: James Toback
- Starring: Harvey Keitel; Tisa Farrow; Jim Brown
- Cinematography: Michael Chapman
- Edited by: Robert Lawrence
- Distributed by: Brut Productions
- Release date: March 2, 1978
- Running time: 89 minutes
- Country: United States
- Language: English
- Budget: $1.3 million

Fingers is a 1978 American crime drama film directed by James Toback. The film is about a troubled young man being pulled between his mob father and his mentally disturbed pianist mother.

== Plot ==
Jimmy "Fingers" Angelelli is an outstanding pianist who dreams of a musical career, but he grew up in a gangster family. His elderly father, Ben, is an illegal loan shark. The son must help him collect debts from defaulters. The plot drama is based on Jimmy's inner turmoil, torn between his love for art, obedience to his father, his own sexuality, and his dark past.

While trying to concentrate on an upcoming recital interview at Carnegie Hall, Jimmy loses focus when he falls for a woman named Carol. He gets further sidetracked when collecting a large debt from a mafioso named Riccamonza, who eventually orders to kill Ben. This event forces Jimmy to seek retribution and kill Riccamonza.

== Cast ==
- Harvey Keitel as Jimmy "Fingers"
- Tisa Farrow as Carol
- Michael V. Gazzo as Ben Angelelli
- Jim Brown as "Dreems"
- Tanya Roberts as Julie
- Marian Seldes as Ruth
- Danny Aiello as Butch
- Ed Marinaro as Gino
- Tony Sirico as Riccamonza
- Dominic Chianese as Arthur Fox
- Largo Woodruff as Dreems' Girl
- Sam Coppola as Sam

== Production ==
James Toback said he originally wanted Robert de Niro to play the lead, but then decided to use de Niro's best friend Harvey Keitel. "Harvey agreed to play Jimmy and quickly began to astonish me by taking the character into dimensions of darkness well beyond my original imagining", wrote Toback. The film was remade in 2005 in France as The Beat That My Heart Skipped.

== Critical reception ==
Writing in The New York Times, critic Vincent Canby noted upon the film's release that it features "a series of anti‐climaxes that dog the movie with the persistence of a humorless flat‐foot," that "[w]ithout building any momentum whatsoever, the movie darts among its various plot threads like a cat who wants play, but can't stick at one thread long enough to have any fun," and that "something more than apparent talent was involved" in Toback's ability to have made the film. A contemporary review of the film in The Boston Phoenix by Stephen Schiff described it as not "just bad; it’s wildly; extravagantly, even entertainingly bad," and "what comes through is not how troubled Jimmy is, but how bizarre the man who made this film [Toback] must be." A review of the film by Thomas Davant for Turner Classic Movies described it as "[a]ggressive, shocking, heart-wrenching" and "[i]n its tale of the battle between dual loyalties, contradictory desires and an internal madness that threatens to consume it all, the film pulses with a desperate power." On the review aggregator website Rotten Tomatoes, 85% of 13 critics' reviews are positive, with an average rating of 6.9/10.

== Music ==
Two notable pieces from the film are "Angel of the Morning" by Merrilee Rush and "Summertime, Summertime" by The Jamies. Director Toback initially wanted to use the song "Summertime" because the movie had "a summertime feel to it", and they wanted to shoot it during the summer months. The whole film, however, is framed by the music of Johann Sebastian Bach's Toccata in E minor (BWV 914), which Keitel's character plays throughout the film, including during his audition at Carnegie Hall.
