= The Fortunes =

English music group

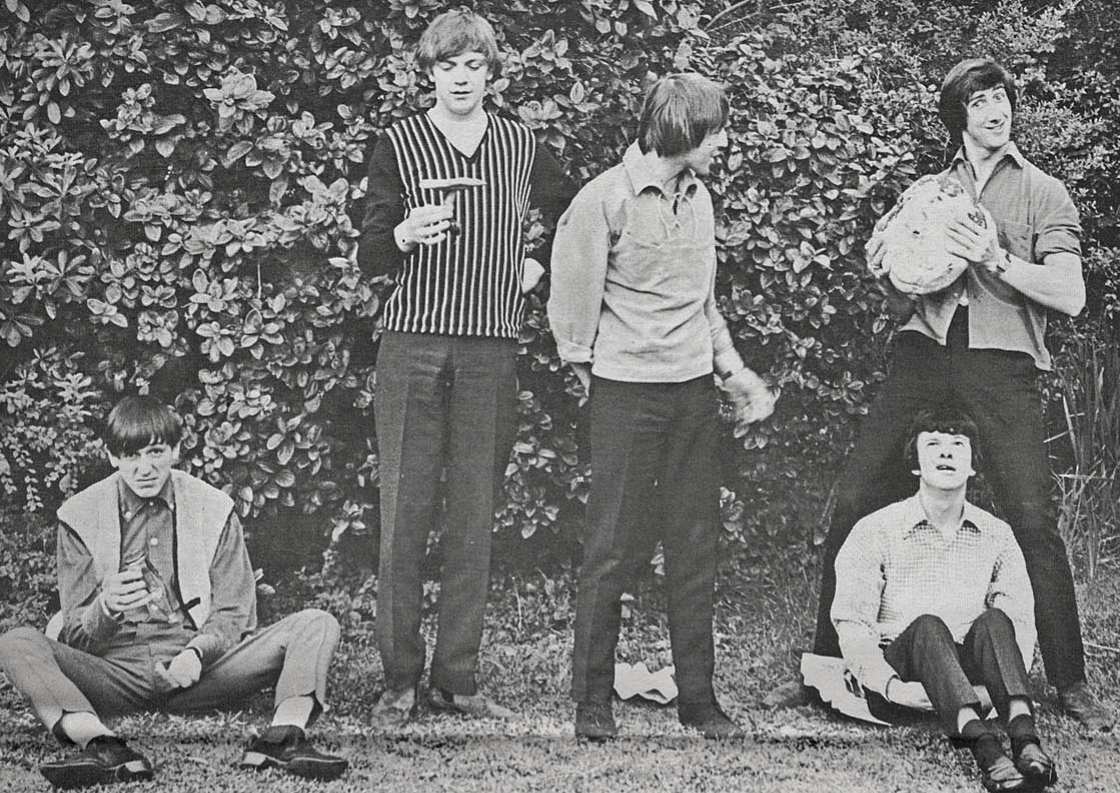
- The Fortunes in early 1966. From left: David Carr, Glen Dale, Barry Pritchard, Andy Brown (standing), Rod Allen (seated)

Background information
- Origin: Birmingham, England
- Genres: Pop; Merseybeat
- Years active: 1963–present
- Labels: Decca, United Artists, US World Pacific, Capitol, Target UK
- Members: Michael Smitham; Chris Hutchison; Eddie Mooney; Glenn Taylor
- Past members: Chris Capaldi; Gary Fletcher; Tony Britnell; Rod Allen; Barry Pritchard; Andy Brown; Glen Dale; David Carr; Shel Macrae; George McAllister; John Trickett; John Davey; Ricky Persell; Paul Keatley; Paul Hooper; Bob Jackson; Geoff Turton
- Website: www.thefortunes.co.uk

The Fortunes are an English harmony beat group. Formed in Birmingham, the Fortunes first came to prominence and international acclaim in 1965 when "You've Got Your Troubles" broke into the US, Canadian and UK Top 10s. Afterwards they had a succession of hits including "Here It Comes Again" and "Here Comes That Rainy Day Feeling Again"; continuing into the 1970s with more globally successful releases such as "Storm in a Teacup" and "Freedom Come, Freedom Go".

In 1966 their manager, Reginald Calvert, was shot dead in a dispute over pirate radio stations.

== Biography ==
In 1958 two Birmingham teens, Rodney Bainbridge (born 31 March 1944) and Barry Pritchard (born 3 April 1944), were attending Moseley School and formed a duo called The Strollers, eventually adding a bassist and drummer. In 1963 The Strollers were spotted by music promoter/pirate radio pioneer Reginald Calvert and his wife Dorothy, who had started a performance school on their estate at Clifton Hall, near Rugby, Warwickshire, and invited Rodney and Barry to live there.

Among those who also attended the school at Clifton Hall were Calvert's other discoveries, such as Johnny Washington, Danny Storm, Buddy Britten and Robbie Hood (a.k.a. Mike West, who had sung with Johnny Kidd and the Pirates), who were being groomed for stardom when Rodney Bainbridge (now Rod Allen) and Barry Pritchard arrived. Reg would also go on to manage Screaming Lord Sutch and the pop group Pinkerton's Assorted Colours. Calvert decided to pair Robbie Hood with Rod (now on bass) and Barry (on guitar) as his "Merry Men".

But after a short time, Calvert decided to break Rod and Barry off to form their own group with a singer named Johnny Washington, who was soon replaced by vocalist/guitarist Glen Dale (Richard Garforth) from Kent who was born on 24 April 1943. The new group was christened The Cliftones and featured as its roster: Rod Allen, Glen Dale and Barry Pritchard as vocalists, Chris Capaldi as piano player, Gary Fletcher as drummer and Tony Britnell (later with the group Jigsaw) as saxophone player.

The Cliftones placed an instrumental track on a compilation album, Brumbeat, issued by the local Dial record label. "Cygnet Twitch" was a working of Tchaikovsky's "Swan Lake", and they subsequently signed to British Decca in 1963. Their first single, a cover of The Jamies 1958 US hit "Summertime, Summertime", was credited to the Fortunes and the Cliftones. However, the vocalists (Rod, Barry and Glen) jettisoned the other Cliftones and added Andy Brown on drums and David Carr on keyboards renaming as "The Fortunes Rhythm Group", which was soon shortened to "The Fortunes". It was the group's American producer, Shel Talmy, who suggested their new name.

The follow-up disc "Caroline", co-written by the singer-songwriter and future Ivy League member Perry Ford and songwriter Tony Hiller, is still in use as the signature tune for the pirate radio station, Radio Caroline.

The Fortunes toured Scotland in October 1964 as the opening act to The Beatles.

The group's next two singles, Gordon Mills' co-composition "I Like the Look of You" and a revival of "Look Homeward Angel" — like the initial brace of releases overseen again by Shel Talmy — also failed to chart. Their fifth release, the Roger Greenaway/Roger Cook number, "You've Got Your Troubles" (1965), reached Number 2 in the UK Singles Chart and was a worldwide hit, including reaching Number 1 in Canada and the American Top 10. Their next two singles were "Here It Comes Again", a UK Number 4 (American Number 27), and "This Golden Ring" a UK Number 14. These sold well, but each less than the previous release.

In late 1965, the group first toured the US, which had them appearing on TV shows like Hullabaloo and playing for 10 days at the Fox Theater in Brooklyn alongside Wilson Pickett, The Toys, The O'Jays, Moody Blues, Peter and Gordon, Lenny Welch and The Vibrations

On 21 June 1966 the group's manager Reg Calvert was shot to death at his home by a former politician Major Oliver Smedley after a business dispute over their two pirate radio stations, Radio City and Radio Atlanta. Smedley was later found not guilty due to self defense.

And when Glen Dale left for a solo career in July 1966, he was replaced by Peter Lee Stirling (formerly of the Beachcombers and the Bruisers), then Scottish singer/guitarist Shel Macrae (from The Kimbos). Stirling, as Daniel Boone, went on to the score the hit "Beautiful Sunday" in 1972.

Three more Fortunes singles ("You Gave Me Somebody to Love", "Is It Really Worth Your While?" and "Our Love has Gone") all failed to chart.

At this point in 1967, the Fortunes left Decca for United Artists. They reunited with Talmy for their next release, "The Idol", a song they had written themselves and although it did get some airplay in the UK, it did not become a hit.

The Fortunes also recorded an advertisement for Coca-Cola in the United States. Their first recording in 1967 was a version of the theme tune, "Things Go Better with Coke", but they are most remembered for introducing the 1969 new slogan recording, used as the main theme for Coca-Cola on both radio and television commercials — "It's The Real Thing".

In 1968 they covered The Move's hit "Fire Brigade" for the US market, but received little airplay or sales. And a recording of Jacques Brel's song "Seasons in the Sun" later that year also failed to generate any interest (but was later a big hit for Canadian Terry Jacks in 1974).

David Carr left the Fortunes in August 1968 due to back issues and moved into production work in the US. Scottish keyboardist George McAllister eventually succeeded Carr in 1970.

In 1970 they recorded an album, That Same Old Feeling, for the US World Pacific record label, with the title track, "That Same Old Feeling" (written by Tony Macaulay and John Macleod), charting for the Fortunes but proving to be a bigger hit for another UK group Pickettywitch. The Fortunes then signed with Capitol in both the UK and US in 1971.

Then followed a steady succession of singles, some of which were hits outside of the UK and US. And it was during this period they had worldwide hits with "Here Comes That Rainy Day Feeling Again" and "Freedom Come, Freedom Go" in 1971, along with "Storm in a Teacup" in 1972.

== Later work ==
George McAllister left the group in July 1977, eventually joining The Rockin' Berries, followed by Shel Macrae (who went solo) in 1978 and drummer Andy Brown that same year. New members John Davey (vocals), John Trickett (drums) and Rick Persell (vocals, guitar) were then brought aboard in 1978 and freshened up the act by adding humor and some short comedy skits.

During the early 80s, the band was managed by John Francis and Rick Persell left in 1981, eventually replaced by Paul Keatley. Barry Pritchard's brother Dave (from UK cabaret act Sight & Sound) also joined in 1981 to replace John Davey, after Davey tragically injured his eyes in an accident, but Dave was also forced to leave due to Multiple sclerosis in 1983. Steve Wilson (vocals, guitar) filled in for Dave briefly

But in 1983 and 1984 respectively, Michael Smitham (vocals, guitar) and Paul Hooper (drums) joined Barry Pritchard and Rod Allen in the Fortunes. This line up of the group were awarded a gold disc in 1987 for over 100,000 sales of their All The Hits and More album.

In 1991 Glen Dale, whilst living in Tenerife in the Canary Islands, formed a group known as Glen Dale's Fortunes alongside Martin Cox (guitar) (who has gone on to be one of the world's top Elton John tributes).

In March 1995 Bob Jackson was added to the Fortunes' ranks, after founder member Barry Pritchard left due to heart problems. Jackson, a former member of the group Badfinger, paid homage to his former bandmates on stage, with a version of the Badfinger penned song "Without You". From July 2005 through May 2006, Jackson left for a year to follow other obligations and Geoff Turton, who was originally a member of the Rockin' Berries, stood in for him.

Barry Pritchard died from a heart attack on 11 January 1999 in Swindon, Wiltshire, UK.

On 10 January 2008 Rod Allen died after suffering for two months from liver cancer. The remaining members of the band said they would continue touring and had already recruited the Dakotas lead singer Eddie Mooney in 2007 when Allen had first taken ill. And during 2008, the regrouped band recorded a new album Play On and appeared in Las Vegas, the Netherlands and Belgium as well as the UK. They toured Canada, the Netherlands and Sweden, in addition to the UK during 2009.

The band had a busy schedule in the UK, Netherlands, Germany and Italy during 2010 and 2011 appearing in Belgium at the Vostertfeesten Festival in August 2010.

Drummer Paul Hooper left the band in early 2010 and was replaced by Glenn Taylor, formerly of Marmalade. The band then released a new studio album, Another Road.

The keyboard player in the original line-up, David Carr, lived and worked in Hollywood, California, doing session work, frequently working with The Ventures and also Kim Fowley. Carr died on 12 July 2011 from a heart attack.

Since 2011, the Fortunes have continued to appear on various 1960s theatre package shows with other artists of the era. Additionally, they have appeared in their own Past and Present theatre show and in 2015 released the accompanying Past and Present live album.

In 2018 the Fortunes successfully toured Australia and keyboard player Bob Jackson retired later in the year due to ill health. He was replaced by ex-Merseybeats and Tornados keyboard player and vocalist Chris Hutchison.

The band continued to feature on 1960s theatre shows such as "Sensational 60s" and "Sixties Gold" as well as cruise appearances and toured the Netherlands, Belgium and Germany in 2022.

Former Fortunes singer Glen Dale died at a hospice care facility after a battle with heart disease, on 13 January 2019, at age 79. Singer Shel Macrae died in 2022 at the age of 77.

The band appeared on the Happy Together Tour in the US during the summer of 2026 with US acts of the 1960s era, including The Association, The Cowsills, Ron Dante of The Archies, Jason Scheff (formerly of Chicago), Gary Puckett and The Vogues. On the Happy Together site, guitarist Smitham reported: "The eagle eyed among you might have seen someone else up there onstage with Ed, Chris and Glenn in America. It's just a temporary thing, and I can only thank Bob Cowsill of The Cowsills for standing in for me for a few days as I've had to fly back to the UK for another little 'heart adjustment'. Nothing too serious, and I am booked on a flight back to a show at GLC Live at 20 Monroe in Grand Rapids on Tuesday August 11......."

=== Streaming Hits in the 2020s ===
In 2021 the Fortunes had two hit singles on the Amazon, Spotify and iTunes download charts with "Never Too Far" (Smitham/Mooney) and "One Special Moment" (Smitham) the band's first chart entries since 1972. The band resumed a UK theatre tour as part of the Sensational 60s Experience package in October 2021 and released an album "Special Moments" in December 2021.

The Fortunes then signed to US label Creative & Dreams in 2022, releasing the singles "Hello My Friend" and "One Special Moment (US Remix), both hits on the UK Heritage Chart, hosted by Mike Read.

In 2023 the Fortunes again charted in the Heritage Charts with their live cover of Dusty Springfield's hit "I Just Don't Know What to Do with Myself". This was from the Sixty Years album released in March 2023.

== Members ==
Original members

- Rod Allen (born Rodney Bainbridge, 31 March 1944, Leicester – 10 January 2008, Eastern Green, Coventry) – lead vocals, bass (1963–2008)
- Barry Pritchard (born Barry Arthur Pritchard, 3 April 1944, Birmingham – 11 January 1999, Swindon, Wiltshire) – lead guitar, vocals (1963–1995)
- Andy Brown (born Andrew Brown, 7 January 1946, Birmingham) – drums (1963–1978)
- Glen Dale (born Richard Garforth, 24 April 1939, Deal, Kent – 13 January 2019, Chesterfield, Derbyshire) – rhythm guitar, vocals (1963–1966)
- David Carr (born 4 August 1943, Leyton, London – 12 July 2011) – keyboards (1963–1968)

Current members

- Michael Smitham (born 29 July 1951, Nuneaton) – guitars, vocals (1983–present)
- Eddie Mooney (born 6 August 1957, Stoke-on-Trent) – lead vocals, bass (2007–present)
- Glenn Taylor (born 15 February 1952, Leicester) – drums (2010–present)
- Chris Hutchison (born 4 April 1963, Sheffield) – keyboards, vocals (2018–present)

Former members

- Bob Jackson – keyboards, vocals (1995–2018)
- Geoff Turton – keyboards, vocals (fill-in for Bob Jackson July 2005-May 2006)
- Peter Lee Stirling - vocals, guitar (1966)
- Shel Macrae (born Andrew Raeburn Semple, 8 March 1943, Burnbank, Scotland, died 22 November 2022)– lead vocals, rhythm guitar (1966–1978)
- George McAllister (born 6 December 1945) vocals, keyboards - (1970–1977)
- John Trickett (born Birmingham) – drums (1978–1984)
- John Davey (born 13 September 1955, Watford) – vocals (1978–1983)
- Rick Persell (born 19 October 1954, Ruislip) – guitar, vocals (1978–1981)
- Paul Keatley - guitar, vocals (1981-1983)
- Dave Pritchard - guitar, vocals (1981-1983)
- Steve Wilson - guitar, vocals (1983)
- Paul Hooper (born 20 August 1948, Wolverhampton) – drums (1984–2010)

== Discography ==
Studio albums

- The Fortunes (1965)
- That Same Old Feeling (1970)
- Here Comes That Rainy Day Feeling Again (1971)
- Storm in a Teacup (1972)
- Some Bridges (1999)
- Heroes Never Die (2004)
- Play On (2008)
- Another Road (2010)

== See also ==
- List of Capitol Records artists
- List of performers on Top of the Pops
- List of artists under the Decca Records label
- Arts in Birmingham
