= Summertime, Summertime =

1958 song by the Jamies

Single by The Jamies
- B-side: "Searching for You"
- Released: July 14, 1958
- Recorded: Roy Nelson Studio, Boston
- Genre: Rock and roll
- Length: 2:00
- Label: Epic
- Songwriter(s): Tom Jameson; Sherm Feller

The Jamies singles chronology
"Summertime, Summertime" (1958)	"Snow Train" (1958)

Audio
- "Summertime, Summertime" on YouTube

"Summertime, Summertime" is a 1958 song by American singing group the Jamies. Written by Boston-based student Tom Jameson, the song became popular in the local music scene after the band promoted their demo to deejays in the area. The single became a nationwide hit in 1958 after being released by Epic Records and would again become a hit in 1962 upon re-release.

The song begins with a fugal introduction, which gets repeated in the coda. It begins with the line "It's Summertime, Summertime, Sum, Sum, Summertime".

This song celebrates the ending of an academic year at high school and enjoying the summertime activities, including swimming, dancing, and romancing, telling the other students to join in the summertime fun, as a "free for all".

The song has since seen critical acclaim and has appeared in movies and advertisements. Several artists have covered the song.

== Background ==
"Summertime, Summertime" was the Jamies' first single and first major hit. The band was formed by Boston University student Tom Jameson and his sister Serena, who then recruited friends Jeannie Roy and Arthur Blair to join. The band's first song was "Summertime, Summertime", which Tom had written. Serena recalled the writing process:

I remember being upstairs while my grandmother lay resting on the couch downstairs. Tom was in the living room, where the piano was, as he composed "Summertime Summertime", until every word and every note was exactly as he wanted it. He was a perfectionist. I thought my grandmother had a lot of patience to listen to it over and over, but she never complained. I think she rather enjoyed it. When he was satisfied that he had written the words and music exactly as he wanted them to be, he asked Jeannie and me if we would sing it.

At Tom's insistence, the group practiced incessantly for weeks until he was satisfied that the band had perfected the arrangement. Roy explained: "Tom paid. He had a couple of copies made, and then he and Arthur took them around to several disc jockeys in the Boston area to see if they could interest the disc jockeys in playing them."

The band has reflected positively on the song. Serena stated: "To think it’s lasted all these years is amazing. It’s really upbeat. It just grabs you. It’s still my favorite song."

== Recording and release ==
The song had gotten popular in the band's hometown of Boston, where local deejays began playing the song at record hops in the area. One deejay then shepherded the song to Epic Records, which was a subsidiary of Columbia Records.

"Summertime, Summertime" was released as a single in July 1958. It was credited to Tom Jameson and manager Sherm Feller; though Feller did not contribute to the song's composition, it was common practice for managers of the time to receive writing credits and publishing rights. The single was a commercial success, reaching number 28 on the Billboard Hot 100. Though the band's follow-up, "Snow Train", did not chart, the band saw success again in 1962 with a re-release of "Summertime, Summertime", which reached number 38.

== Reception and legacy ==
The song saw positive press from music writers of the time; Billboard glowingly described the song as "an exciting blend of medieval polyphonic structure with the modern hormonal sound". Since its release, the song has seen critical acclaim. Andrew Hamilton of AllMusic said of the song: "The Jamies' 'Summertime, Summertime' is one of those songs you only have to hear once for it to live rent-free in your mind forever. The bouncy doo wop novelty ... surely provided inspiration for later novelty groups like the Village People and Sha Na Na to perform songs in the same campy style." Bruce Springsteen said of the song: "It always signaled the beginning of summer for me, in its baroque joy, and I always loved hearing it for the first time, each summer. It meant summer was on!"

The song notably appeared in the 1978 movie Fingers, where Harvey Keitel's character remarks: "Do you believe this? This is the Jamies, man! 'Summertime, Summertime', the most musically inventive song of 1958!" It has also appeared in advertisements for Applebee's and Buick.

== Cover versions ==
"Summertime, Summertime" was covered by the Fortunes shortly after the original's 1962 rerelease. It has since been performed by the Doodletown Pipers, Hobby Horse, Jan & Dean, the Legendary Masked Surfers, and Sha Na Na.
