= Our Kid =

British vocal group

Our Kid were a British vocal group discovered by the ITV show, New Faces, winning an edition of the programme on 1 May 1976, although they did not go on to reach the series grand final. They then had a number two hit single on the UK Singles Chart in 1976 with "You Just Might See Me Cry", which peaked on 3 July 1976. The track was released on the Polydor label, and spent eleven weeks in the UK Singles Chart. The song was written by Roger Greenaway and Barry Mason. Further singles "I Can't Live Without You" and "Romeo and Juliet" were not successful.

The band came from Liverpool and consisted of four boys in their early teens. The lead vocalist was Kevin Rowan (born 1964); Rowan later left the band and was replaced by Frankie Jones. The other members were Brian Farrell (b. 1963), Terry McCreith (b. 1961) and Terry Baccino (1961-2020). Baccino replaced original member David Newall (b. 1965) who left the band two weeks before New Faces to concentrate on a new band called Young World with Ian McNabb and Chris Sharrock (who went on to form The Icicle Works). Newall still performs today with the international corporate showband 'Spy Candy' and also performs solo under the name of "David Michaelson". Our Kid appeared in summer season at Great Yarmouth and completed the full season. Their exposure was hampered somewhat by education authorities refusing them permission to take part in performances. For example, on 21 June 1976 a scheduled appearance on Blue Peter was cancelled at the last minute, when Liverpool City Council's Education Department refused to issue a licence for them to take part, as 21 days notice had not been given.

Lack of further chart activity left Our Kid with the one-hit wonder tag.
