= John Macleod (songwriter) =

English songwriter and musician

- Origin: Canada
- Genre: Pop music
- Occupations: Songwriter, musician
- Years active: 1960s–present

John Macleod (sometimes spelled McLeod) is a Canadian-born English songwriter and musician. He co-wrote the hits "Baby, Now That I've Found You" for The Foundations, "Let the Heartaches Begin for Long John Baldry, and "Heaven Knows I'm Missing Him Now", amongst others.

== Background ==
John Macleod was born in or around 1926.

Macleod moved to Britain in the 1940s, and lived in the Halifax area with his wife before moving to Brighton. In the 1950s, he was a member of the vocal group the Maple Leaf Four, with his brother, baritone Norman, Alan Harvey as tenor and Joe Melia (stagename Joe Ross) as second tenor. The group made regular appearances on British TV, and released at least two albums, Home on the Range and Old Familiar Favourites.

In the early 1970s, Macleod presented a series of easy listening instrumental albums comprising cover versions of chart hits, on the Pye label. In 1975 he worked again with his brother Norman, and brother-in-law actor Bill Pertwee, on the music for the Dad's Army stage show, producing an EMI single "Get Out And Get Under The Moon", and writing the B-side number "Hooligans!" – after Bill Pertwee's character Warden Hodge's catch phrase.

== Career ==
=== 1960s ===
By the early 1960s, Macleod worked on writing advertising jingles. In the 1960s and early 1970s, Macleod co-wrote songs with Tony Macaulay. They had major success with The Foundations, when they recorded "Baby Now That I've Found You", and it topped the UK Singles Chart in November 1967.

This was followed by Long John Baldry's "Let the Heartaches Begin", Paper Dolls' "Something Here in My Heart (Keeps A Tellin' Me No)" and Pickettywitch's "That Same Old Feeling".

Working with Tony Macaulay, Macleod composed "Marie Take a Chance", which was recorded by Clem Curtis with arrangements handled by Des Champ. The song was produced by Barry Class. It had some good reviews, with one of them saying it had breakout appeal. It also had airplay on US stations, KIMN, WAKY and KCPX during the month of April.

=== 1970s ===
In 1971, his album A String Bag Of Bones was released on Pye NSPL 41012. It was part of the Pye 4D series which were Quadraphonic releases. This one could be decoded with the Sansui QS decoder.

Pickettywitch recorded the Irwin Levine, L. Russell Brown song "Number Wonderful" which was recorded by Pickettywitch. His composition, "Point of No Return" was on the B side. The single was released on Pye 7N 45126 in 1972.

The March 10, 1977 issue of The Stage reported that Clem Curtis and the Foundations had been reunited with Foundations original producer John McLeod who had co-written a song with Dave Myers for the Song for Europe contest. The group was made up of Clem Curtis, Leroy Carter, Clem Curtis, Georges Delanbanque, Valentine Pascal and John Savile. With the group now billing themselves as The Foundations, they competed in the Eurovision 1977 song contest with Macleod and Myers' composition, "Where Were You When I Needed Your Love". The group were favorites to win, but a strike by the electricians caused them to not be televised. They ended up coming third behind "What Do You Say To Love" by Mary Mason in second place and "Rock Bottom" by Lynsey de Paul as the first place winner.

== Compositions ==
The full list of songs that Macleod wrote with Macaulay are:

Song title	Performer	Peak UK chart position	Date of appearance on chart
"Baby Now That I've Found You"	The Foundations	1	23 September 1967
"Let The Heartaches Begin"	Long John Baldry	1	28 October 1967
"Back on My Feet Again"	The Foundations	18	20 January 1968
"Something Here in My Heart (Keeps A Tellin' Me No)"	Paper Dolls	11	9 March 1968
"Any Old Time (You're Lonely and Sad)"	The Foundations	48	1 May 1968
"Mexico"	Long John Baldry	15	12 October 1968
"Marie Take a Chance"	Clem Curtis	–	January 1969
"In the Bad Bad Old Days (Before You Loved Me)"	The Foundations	8	12 March 1969
"Heaven Knows I'm Missing Him Now"	Sandie Shaw	–	–
"My Little Chickadee"	The Foundations	Note: US release only	–
"That Same Old Feeling"	Pickettywitch	5	21 February 1970
"Baby Take Me in Your Arms"	Jefferson (US)	23, 15 (US & Canada release only)	20 December 1969
"(It's Like A) Sad Old Kinda Movie"	Pickettywitch	16	June 1970

== Discography ==
- John Macleod Presents Hits Philharmonic – The London Pops Orchestra (Pye, 1970)
- John Macleod Presents Hits Philharmonic Vol.2 – The London Pops Orchestra (Pye, 1970)
- John Macleod Presents Hits Philharmonic Vol.3 – The London Pops Orchestra (Pye, 1971)
- John Macleod Presents A String Bag of Bones (Pye, 1971)
