= Freedom Come, Freedom Go =

Single by The Fortunes

from the album That Same Old Feeling
- B-side: "There's a Man"
- Released: August 20, 1971
- Genre: Pop; bubblegum pop; reggae
- Length: 3:16
- Label: Capitol ST-809
- Songwriters: Roger Cook; Roger Greenaway; Albert Hammond; Mike Hazlewood
- Producers: Roger Cook, Roger Greenaway

The Fortunes US singles chronology
| "Here Comes That Rainy Day Feeling Again" (1971) | "Freedom Come, Freedom Go" (1971) | "Storm in a Teacup" (1972) |

"Freedom Come, Freedom Go" is a pop song by The Fortunes. It was the third of three releases from their That Same Old Feeling album, and saw the band revive their fortunes by working in a Britgum idiom.

The song became an international hit in 1971, reaching the top 10 in the UK, Ireland and New Zealand and the top 20 in Australia. It was a minor hit in North America, where it was released as "Freedom Comes, Freedom Goes" and got most of its airplay on easy listening/MOR stations.

In 2002, Robin Carmody of Freaky Trigger named it among ten British bubblegum pop classics, describing it as the genre's most "socially significant" song. He wrote that it brought social commentary to the genre "without sounding forced or strained: it's the sound of London on the cusp, the upper-middle-class ... getting down to the sounds of reggae from the estate just a mile away over in the safe Labour seats, gradually breaking down ancient class divisions as the effects of the 60s seep into life as most people live it."

== Cover versions ==
French singer Claude François had a 1971 hit with an adaptation of the song under the title "Il fait beau, il fait bon", with French lyrics by Eddie Marnay. Singers of musical Belles belles belles covered the Claude François' song.

Hong Kong singer Nancy Sit covered this song in 1973.

== Chart performance ==
| Chart (1971–72) | Peak position |
|---|---|
| Argentina | 2 |
| Australia Kent Music Report | 13 |
| Canada RPM Adult Contemporary | 16 |
| Ireland | 5 |
| New Zealand (Listener) | 3 |
| UK Singles Chart | 6 |
| US Billboard Hot 100 | 72 |
| US Billboard Adult Contemporary | 12 |
| US Cash Box Top 100 | 80 |
