= You Gave Me Somebody to Love =

1965 single by the Dreamlovers

Single by the Dreamlovers
- B-side: "Doin' Things Together With You"
- Released: March 1965
- Length: 3:07
- Label: Warner Bros.
- Songwriters: Peter Andreoli; Vini Poncia; Jerry Ross
- Producer: Jerry Ross

The Dreamlovers singles chronology
"Oh Baby Mine (I Get So Lonely)" (1964)	"You Gave Me Somebody to Love" (1965)	"The Bad Times Make the Good Times" (1966)

Audio'
- "You Gave Me Somebody to Love" on YouTube

"You Gave Me Somebody to Love" is a song written by Peter Andreoli, Vini Poncia, and Jerry Ross and initially recorded by American doo-wop group the Dreamlovers. A "Walker Brothers-styled" ballad, their version was released as a single through Warner Bros. Records in March 1965 and reached number 121 on the US Billboard Bubbling Under Hot 100.

In May 1965, British pop group Manfred Mann recorded a version, which was included on their US-only studio album My Little Red Book of Winners on September 13, 1965. After receiving overdubs and backing vocals, His Master's Voice released their recording as a single in July 1966 against the band's wishes; it peaked at number 36 on the Record Retailer, but received unfavorable reviews. Fellow British band the Fortunes had released a version a week prior, and their recording became a top-40 hit in the Netherlands.

== Original version ==
"You Gave Me Somebody to Love" was written by Peter Andreoli, Vini Poncia, and Jerry Ross. According to his daughter, Ross wrote the song for his wife in the basement of his home. The song was originally recorded by the Dreamlovers, an American doo-wop group who had scored a Billboard Hot 100 top-ten single with "When We Get Married" in 1961. However, by 1965 their hits had dried up despite a switch to the major music label Warner Bros. Records. Their recording was produced by Ross. Musicologist Jay Warner classifies the Dreamlovers recording as a "Walker Brothers-styled rhythm ballad". Similarly, AllMusic's Bruce Eder describes it as "majestic" and "rhythm guitar driven" which possessed a "grandeur" not found in the Dreamlovers other material at the time.

Warner Bros. released "You Gave Me Somebody to Love" as a single in March 1965, with "Doin' Things Together With You" on the B-side. The single was not a major hit, only reaching number 121 on the US Billboard Bubbling Under Hot 100, but gave the Dreamlovers their only chart entry for Warner Bros. Records. In their review of the single, Billboard staff wrote that the single was a "slow driver which the lead singer builds into a production" that featured "strong support from the group". The reviewer for Cash Box believed the single was an "effectively-building rhythmic ode" that made the band "logical candidates to reach the charts".

== British covers ==
"You Gave Me Somebody to Love"
- Danish single sleeve

Single by Manfred Mann

from the album My Little Red Book of Winners!
- B-side: "Poison Ivy"
- Released: July 1, 1966
- Recorded: May 24 & September 30, 1965
- Studio: EMI, London
- Length: 3:07
- Label: His Master's Voice
- Songwriters: Peter Andreoli; Vini Poncia; Jerry Ross
- Producer: John Burgess

Manfred Mann UK singles chronology
"Pretty Flamingo" (1966)	"You Gave Me Somebody to Love" (1966)	"Just Like a Woman" (1966)

Audio'
- "You Gave Me Somebody to Love" on YouTube

=== Manfred Mann version ===
In 1965, British pop group Manfred Mann recorded a version of "You Gave Me Somebody to Love". They recorded the backing track to their version on May 24, 1965 at EMI Studios in London with John Burgess producing. It was completed in three takes. However, Burgess discarded the track for British release as he believed it was not "up to standard" for the group. In September 1965, the group's guitarist Mike Vickers left the band for a career in composing and arranging. On September 30, Vickers returned to EMI to add overdubs to "You Gave Me Somebody to Love", which's production was revised into a sound inspired by Phil Spector's Wall of Sound technique. Also added were backing vocals added by EMI's female act The Three Bells.

"You Gave Me Somebody to Love" was initially released on Manfred Mann's US-only album My Little Red Book of Winners!, through Ascot Records on September 13, 1965. This version featured the original recording without any overdubs by Vickers. When Manfred Mann's contract with EMI in the UK lapsed during May 1966, the label opted to sign singer Paul Jones as a solo artist instead. Manfred Mann signed a contract with Fontana Records, prompting EMI to "scour their tape archives" for unreleased material "to beat Fontana to the punch". Burgess approved for "You Gave Me Somebody to Love" to be released as a UK A-side, which occurred on July 1, 1966, through His Master's Voice. The B-side was the similarly previously unissued cover of "Poison Ivy", recorded in March 1965.

The release was not authorized by the band, who issued a statement against it in the British music press, with Manfred Mann himself promoting the Fortunes version of the single, issued a week prior. This didn't prevent the Manfred Mann version from charting; it entered the Record Retailer singles chart at number 44 on July 13, 1966, before peaking at number 36 on July 27. It spent four weeks in the top 50. According to writer Greg Russo, this was "a fair showing for an older track". However, it was Manfred Mann's lowest charting UK single up until this point. "You Gave Me Somebody to Love" became Manfred Mann's final single on His Master's Voice, and their final to feature lead vocalist Paul Jones before he embarked on a solo career.

Writing for Disc and Music Echo, journalist Penny Valentine did not identify the voice of Paul Jones on the track, being undecided on "whether that's good or bad". However, after a couple more spins, she felt "pleased to know that it's good", writing that it was "a haunting melody". She did, however, feel that it was not as big of a hit as their previous single "Pretty Flamingo". Writing for Melody Maker, journalist Chris Welch felt that Manfred Mann's anger at the single's release was justified, as Welch felt the "song and arrangement are a bit of a mess", despite Jones' good vocal performance. Although he felt that the single was as "out-of-the-ordinary" and "inventive" as one would expect from the band, he felt it was not "commercial enough" to follow up "Pretty Flamingo" and was tempted to call it "pretty awful". Similarly, in Record Mirror, Norman Jopling and Peter Jones believed "it's by no means the best the group has produced". They felt that the single was hampered by a "lack of distinction" and was "indifferent", despite getting "easy-on-the-ear" after the first "half-chorus".

==== Personnel ====
Personnel according to the liner notes of the 1997 CD Manfred Mann At Abbey Road: 1963 To 1966.

Manfred Mann

- Paul Jones – lead and backing vocals
- Mike Vickers – guitar, saxophone, arrangement
- Mike Hugg – drums, backing vocals
- Tom McGuinness – bass guitar, backing vocals
- Manfred Mann – keyboards, backing vocals

Other personnel

- The Three Bells – backing vocals
- John Burgess – producer
- Norman Smith – engineer

=== The Fortunes version ===
Another British band, the Fortunes, recorded "You Gave Me Somebody to Love" as a single, sung by bassist Rod Allen. Their version was released as a double A-side together with "Silent Street" on June 24, 1966 through Decca Records, a week before the Manfred Mann version appeared on single. The Fortunes version was released two weeks after co-lead vocalist Glen Dale had left the group due to musical differences. He was replaced by Shel Macrae, who helped promote "You Gave Somebody to Love" on the radio show Saturday Club. However, by late July 1966 the Fortunes had stopped promoting "You Gave Me Somebody to Love" on radio, and withdrew from a BBC television show. Although Mann had promoted the Fortunes version in the music press, Rod Allen responded to Mann's statement by stating that the Fortunes "didn't need his [Mann's] cheap patronisations", and that they agreed that Manfred Mann's version was "below standard".

With the Fortunes and Manfred Mann version being issued within a week of each other, it was believed a battle on the singles chart would ensue. However, the Fortunes version of "You Gave Me Somebody to Love" failed to reach the Record Retailer chart, though charted in the national singles chart published by Disc and Music Echo and Melody Maker, where it peaked at number 38 and 39, respectively. Their version also charted on the Veronica Top 40 in the Netherlands, peaking at number 38. Regarding the single's chart performance, Allen believed Manfred Mann had the upper hand, feeling that the reason of the Manfred Mann version selling was because of the "big success they had" with "Pretty Flamingo".

Writing for Record Mirror, Norman Jopling and Peter Jones believed the single featured a "good beat" and "full strings". They believed the single featured the "usual professional Fortunes massed vocal sounds", and ended by stating that it was a "good song", "big ballad" with "hit sounds".

== Chart performance ==
=== The Dreamlovers version ===
Chart (1965)	Peak position
US Billboard Bubbling Under Hot 100	121
US Cash Box Looking Ahead	133
US Record World Singles Coming Up	128

=== Manfred Mann version ===
Chart (1966)	Peak position
Australia (Kent Music Report)	98
UK (Disc and Music Echo Top 50)	41
UK (Melody Maker Pop 50)	38
UK (Record Retailer Top 50)	36

=== The Fortunes version ===
Chart (1966)	Peak position
Netherlands (Veronica Top 40)	38
UK (Disc and Music Echo Top 50)	38
UK (Melody Maker Pop 50)	39
