= Storm in a Teacup (The Fortunes song) =

Single by The Fortunes

from the album Storm in a Teacup
- B-side: "I'm Not Following You"
- Released: 1972
- Genre: Pop
- Label: Capitol Records
- Songwriters: Lynsey Rubin and Ron Roker

The Fortunes singles chronology
"Freedom Come, Freedom Go" (1971)	"Storm in a Teacup" (1972)	"Baby by the Way" (1972)

Official audio
- Storm in a Teacup on YouTube

"Storm in a Teacup" is a song written by Lynsey de Paul (credited as Lynsey Rubin) and Ron Roker, recorded by the British group The Fortunes and released as a single in 1972.

== Background ==
The recording was arranged by Lew Warburton and produced by Roger Cook and Roger Greenaway. Rod Allen (The Fortunes bassist and vocalist) later spoke about De Paul and recalled, "She was great. Loaded with songs, she kept popping into Cook's and Greenaway's office. One day, she walked in with 'Storm,' and Roger was knocked out." Indeed, Cook was so knocked out that he recommended that The Fortunes record the song, with him and Greenway as the producers and an arrangement by Lew Warburton.Rick Wakeham played keyboards on the single version and said he called it the 'pitter patter' song.

Upon release, the single reached No. 7 on the UK Singles Chart, No. 9 on the Irish Singles Chart (IRMA), No.15 on the New Zealand singles chart and No. 65 on the Australian Kent Music Report in 1972. It also spent two weeks in the Dutch Tipparade. De Paul revealed to OK! magazine in a 1996 interview that it sold three million copies. The song peaked at No. 11 on the Adelaide, Australia 5AD Official Top 40 on 12 May 1972. It was the 84th best-selling single in the UK in 1972 and ranked number 496 on the Radio Luxembourg Top 500 of the 1970s. It was also the second track on K-Tel's first UK album "20 Dynamic Hits", which reached No. 1 for 8 weeks on the Official UK albums chart. In 2026, it was included on the compilation album "Now Yearbook 1972" which reached No. 1 on the Official UK Compilation Charts.

The song is often played on BBC Radio, most recently on the BBC Radio 2 programme The Great British Songbook. In his autobiography, John Lydon states that he loves "Storm in a Teacup", actor and singer Bradley Walsh told NME it was the first song he remembers hearing and buying, and actor John Challis stated that it was one of his favourite songs. Scottish journalist Alastair McKay describes the song as "an extraordinary thing, a swirl of pop soul". Storm in a Teacup was the name of The Fortunes' album, also released in 1972 on the Capitol label. Classic Rock History ranked it the best Fortunes song in their Top 10 Songs By The Fortunes, stating "This soulful pop-rock favorite would see The Fortunes record updated versions, first in 1979, then again in 1982, and yet again in 1994. Although nothing beats the original, “Storm in a Teacup” remains The Fortunes’ signature song."

== Chart performance ==
Chart (1972)	Peak position
Ireland	9
New Zealand	15
UK	7
Australia	65

== Other versions ==
De Paul recorded her own version of the song as the B-side to her first single "Sugar Me" on the MAM record label a few months later. The single was a hit in the UK, Spain, Belgium, the Netherlands, Germany, Sweden, and Australia. This version has been included on several of her compilation albums, starting with The World of Lynsey de Paul and most recently on the CD Sugar and Beyond. De Paul's version was also featured on the soundtrack of an episode of the German TV series Der Kommissar, entitled "Ein Mädchen nachts auf der Straße". De Paul also performed a live version of the song on the prime-time BBC TV show "The Two Ronnies".

"Storm in a Teacup" has been covered by other artists, notably Springfield Revival on their 1973 album, Highlights, the Tremeloes, Tony Hatch and His Orchestra, Alan Caddy Orchestra And Singers, Steven Smith and Father, Bob Rowe, The Mike Morton Congregation, Orchester Konrad Grewe, Cliff Carpenter, folk group "Just Us" on their self-titled album, and also Manchester United F.C. in 1972, (and in 1995 on the CD album Glory! Glory! Man. United). Two Brazilian groups, "The Futures" and "Spirit Of Freedom", recorded versions of the song. Danish singer Vojo released his version on his 1976 Polydor album "What a Difference a Day Makes" and as the B-side to his single "Dear Son! Come Home For Christmas".

Engelbert Humperdinck, de Paul's erstwhile label mate, performed his version of "Storm in a Teacup" on his show Engelbert with The Young Generation in 1972. Cliff Richard also performed it on episode 13 of his "It's Cliff Richard" BBC TV show.

A French language version of the song, entitled "Dans La Vie, Tout S'Arrange", was recorded by Ginette Reno and released as a single in Canada in 1972, where it peaked at No. 2 on the French-Canadian Top Ten. It was re-released as a single a second time in 1978 and has been included on several Reno compilation albums. The song is included in a listing of Quebec's best and most popular songs from the 1970s. More recently, a version of "Dans La Vie, Tout S'Arrange" by Vanessa Duchel/Maxime L was featured on the album Star Académie 2009, from the Canadian reality TV series Star Académie. The album reached No.1 on the Billboard Canadian albums chart in April 2009. On 18 April 2022, Roaddust Records announced the worldwide release of "Storm In a Teacup" by Thomas Engström as a single, which was also included on his 2023 album, Pure Pop.

== Re-recorded versions ==
In 1979, The Fortunes released the EP single "Movin' Out", written by Billy Joel, which featured a new version of "Storm in a Teacup" as the second track on the B-side. This was followed by the 1982 release by The Fortunes of a new and updated version of the song, taken from their album Their Golden Hits, as a single on the Phillips. De Paul also recorded an updated version of the song as a track on her 1994 album, Just a Little Time.
