= Baby Now That I've Found You =

1967 single by The Foundations

"Baby, Now That I've Found You"

Single by the Foundations

from the album From the Foundations
- B-side: "Come on Back to Me"
- Released: Mid-1967 (UK)
- Genre: Pop-soul
- Length: 2:44
- Label: Pye; Uni
- Songwriters: Tony Macaulay; John Macleod
- Producer: Tony Macaulay

The Foundations singles chronology
"Baby, Now That I've Found You" (1967)	"Back on My Feet Again" (1968)

Official audio
- "Baby Now That I've Found You" on YouTube

"Baby, Now That I've Found You" is a song written by Tony Macaulay and John Macleod, and performed by the Foundations. Part of the song was written in the same bar of a Soho tavern where Karl Marx is supposed to have written Das Kapital. The lyrics are a plea that an unnamed subject not break up with the singer.

== Background ==
According to Roy Delo of the group, The Ways and Means who were managed by Ron Fairway, they were offered the chance to record "Baby Now That I've Found You". They already had some success with their single, "Sea of Faces". One day Tony Macaulay came around and got out a guitar. They heard the song and said "yeh, it’s a nice catchy song, but it's not the sort of song for us", and to their later regret, turned it down. So the song was given to the Foundations. The lead vocal is by Clem Curtis.

Ron Fairway is the man who is credited with first discovering the Foundations. He became co-manager of the group. Barry Class was the man with the money while Fairway was the man with the connections, whose job was to find gigs for the band.

=== Issues ===
Following the success of the single there would be issues involving two men formerly associated with the band, Ron Fairway and Raymond Morrison.

Rock historian Roger Dopson described what took place between Ron Fairway and Barry Class as a behind the scenes struggle. Fairway was allegedly pushed out, leaving Class as the sole manager. Fairway made an attempt to sue the band, alleging that he was wrongfully dismissed as the group's co-manager. The band claimed he had resigned of his own accord. The 2 December issue of New Musical Express wrote that it was likely to be several months before the case would be heard. According to the 8 November issue of Melody Maker, Class stated that it was a friction of personalities which had been going on for about four months.

Raymond Morrison founded The Ramong Sound which evolved into the Foundations. As per the 27 July issue of Melody Maker, Raymond (Ray) Morrison had taken out legal action against the Foundations. During the court hearing that took three hours, Morrison claimed that he had discovered the talent of the group. He was unsuccessful in his bid to put freeze on a portion of the group's earnings. Morrison had served a six month sentence and had been released in July 1967. The case was heard by Judge Stamp who said in reference to the song, "Baby, Now That I've Found You", "I cannot understand how it can be suggested that a song which came into existence after Mr. Morrison had severed his connection with the group can be one in which he can have any share or interest". He also dismissed a similar motion against the Pye label.

== Original recording and the Foundations ==
=== Recording the song ===
According to an interview of Alan Warner by Jack Hodgins' of Vinyl Vibes, (Radio 2NUR FM) Tony Macaulay had hired a room at the back of a pub for the band to rehearse the song. Macaulay walked out saying that it was terrible. But the group later recorded it in a studio. Warner also said that the song was recorded two four track recorders running in snyc. Warner said that there was some kind of coding (motion sensing) where the tapes would come back to the same position when re-wound. A man would have to have his hand on the flange, and if one tape sped up he would slow it down. They used Eric Ford in place of the Foundations bass player. The rest of the band was used and John MacLeod played piano.

According to Tony Macualay, the group had a useful horn section, and the song was recorded in a number of takes and had to be finished off with the help of backing singers. Eric Allandale, the group's trombonist recalled things a bit differently and said that the song was done in a couple of takes.

According to the book, When Music Migrates Crossing British and European Racial Faultlines, 1945–2010, by Professor Jon Stratton, Clem Curtis, a former Trinidadian boxer sounded like he was singing in phonetic English and the music was awkward. The book made a reference to "Alan Warner's guitar reggae-derived guitar chank sitting uneasily with Tom Jones horn chants and cod-Motown rhythms".

On 25 August 1967 the Foundations released the song as their debut single. It was a sleeper, and for ten weeks it wasn't doing anything. Unlike The Ways and Means' single, "Sea of Faces" which was played on and became a hit on pirate radio stations, Radio City and Radio Caroline, "Baby, Now that I've Found You" was not played on them. Luckily for the Foundations, their song was not being played on the pirate stations at that stage. The newly launched BBC Radio 1 was avoiding those singles that were being played on the pirate stations.

=== Musicians ===
- Eric Allandale - trombone
- Pat Burke - saxophone
- Clem Curtis - lead vocal
- Mike Elliott - saxophone
- Eric Ford - bass
- Tony Gomesz - organ
- Tim Harris - drums
- John Macleod - piano
- Alan Warner - guitar
- Unknown - backing vocals

=== Chart performance and success ===
After receiving airplay on BBC Radio 1, it met with great success. Having moved up from the previous week's no. 2 spot, "Baby, Now That I've Found You" replaced The Bee Gees' single, "Massachusetts" in the no. 1 spot of the Melody Maker Pop 30 chart. The Foundations now had their picture on the front page of the 11 November issue of Melody Maker. It was still at no. 1 the following week, confirming the two weeks at the top of the UK Singles Chart status. It was also noted in the Melody Maker magazine that week that Ron Fairway was no longer director of Class Management. This left Barry Class in sole charge of things.

The 25 November 1967 issue of Disc and Music Echo wrote that the Foundations had qualified for the Silver Disc award for British sales of the disc reaching 250,000.

The record would become a number 11 hit on the Billboard Hot 100 in the US. The song also reached number 1 on the Canadian RPM magazine charts on 10 February 1968.

The B side "Come On Back to Me" made the Record World, One Stop Top Ten chart in the Consolidated One Stop Detroit, Michigan section. It was no. 5 on the week of 10 February 1968.

The 10 February 1968 issue of Billboard ran a picture of three of the band members and Louis Benjamin, head of Pye Records presenting a gold record to them. This was to mark the million sales of their debut single. Also in the picture was the group's manager Barry Class.

=== Other recordings ===
Another version of the song was recorded by the Foundations in 1968, featuring Colin Young, Clem Curtis' replacement. This was on a Marble Arch album that featured newer stereo versions of their previous hits.

In 1977, RCA Records release the Dan Schafer remake of the Foundations' hit single, working with producers Bruce Goldberg and Don Davis for the RCA Victor distributed 'Tortoise International' label based out of Detroit.

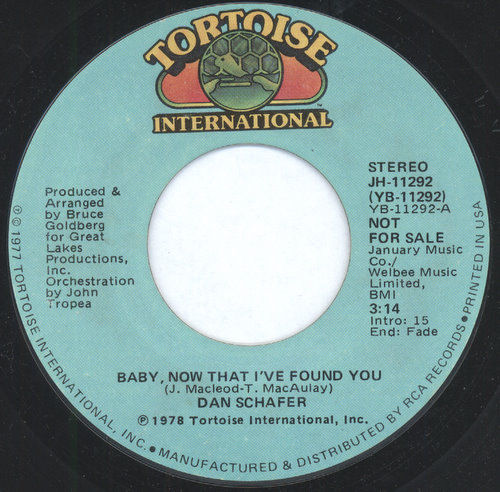
RCA/Tortoise International single 1977

Clem Curtis, the original lead singer of the band, recorded his own version which was released on the Opium label OPIN 001 as a 7" single and a 12" version OPINT001 in 1987. In the late 1980s, Clem Curtis and Alan Warner teamed up to recut "Baby, Now That I've Found You" and "Build Me Up Buttercup", as well as other hits of the Foundations.

== Charts ==
=== Weekly charts ===
Chart (1967–1968)	Peak position
Australia Go-Set	21
Belgium	12
Canada RPM	1
Ireland (IRMA)	3
Netherlands	13
New Zealand	16
Norway	6
South Africa	10
UK	1
U.S. Billboard Hot 100	11
U.S. Record World	9
U.S. Cash Box Top 100	8

=== Year-end charts ===
Chart (1967)	Rank
UK	13

Chart (1968)	Rank
Canada	46
U.S. Billboard	83
U.S. Cash Box	47

== Alison Krauss version ==
"Baby, Now That I've Found You"

Single by Alison Krauss

from the album Now That I've Found You: A Collection
- Released: 18 July 1995
- Recorded: 1994
- Genre: Bluegrass, country
- Length: 3:49
- Label: Rounder
- Producers: Alison Krauss; Union Station

Alison Krauss singles chronology
"When You Say Nothing at All" (1995)	"Baby, Now That I've Found You" (1995)	"Baby Mine" (1996)

In 1995, American bluegrass-country singer Alison Krauss released the song as a single from her compilation album Now That I've Found You: A Collection. Her version appeared in the Australian comedy film, The Castle. It peaked at number 49 on the Billboard Hot Country Singles & Tracks chart. The song won the 1996 Grammy Award for Best Female Country Vocal Performance. In 2024, Rolling Stone ranked the song at #135 on its 200 Greatest Country Songs of All Time ranking.

=== Charts ===
==== Weekly charts ====
Chart (1995)	Peak position
Canada Country Singles (RPM)	46
Iceland (Íslenski Listinn Topp 40)	6
UK Singles (Official Charts)	95
US Hot Country Songs (Billboard)	49

=== Awards and nominations ===
Award	Category	Result
38th Grammy Awards	Best Female Country Vocal Performance	Won

== Cover versions ==
On July 23, 2026, American singer/actress Ella Bright released a duet version of the song, titled "Baby Now That I Found You", with Irish singer Niall Horan; the song was taken from the Off Campus soundtrack.

== Use in film ==
The Foundations' recording of the song appeared on the soundtrack to the film Shallow Hal. The Alison Krauss version was featured in the 1997 Australian comedy, The Castle. Her rendition was also featured in the end credits of the 2001 film Delivering Milo.
