= Here Comes That Rainy Day Feeling Again =

Single by The Fortunes

from the album Here Comes That Rainy Day Feeling Again
- B-side: "I Gotta Dream"; alternate "Bad Side of Town"
- Released: April 1971
- Genre: Soft rock
- Length: 2:56
- Label: Capitol ST-809
- Songwriters: Tony Macaulay; Roger Cook; Roger Greenaway
- Producer: Roger Cook

The Fortunes US singles chronology
"That Same Old Feeling" (1970)	"Here Comes That Rainy Day Feeling Again" (1971)	"Freedom Come, Freedom Go" (1971)

"Here Comes That Rainy Day Feeling Again" is a pop song composed by Tony Macaulay, Roger Cook, and Roger Greenaway. In 1971, it became the third U.S. top 40 hit for English band the Fortunes and their fifth in Canada.

== Background ==
The song uses depressing images to describe the singer's mood anticipating a breakup with his significant other, comparable to the feeling of a rainy day or a Monday, contrasted with the "memories of Sunday" when the two were still together, as he hopes she changes her mind and comes back to him. The bridge is noted for its lines: "Misty morning eyes/ I'm trying to disguise the way I feel/ But, I just can't hide it/ People seem to know/ The loneliness will show/ I'm thinking of my pride/ But, breaking up inside, girl." Lead singer Rod Allen uses a vocal technique similar to that used by Frankie Valli on his solo records.

The song reached number 15 on the U.S. Billboard Hot 100 and number 8 on the Cash Box Top 100. It was also a hit in Canada (number 12) and charted minorly in Australia.

== Chart performance ==
=== Weekly charts ===
Chart (1971)	Peak position
Australia Kent Music Report	43
Canada RPM Top Singles	12
UK Singles Chart	51
US Billboard Hot 100	15
US Billboard Easy Listening	8
US Cash Box Top 100	8

=== Year-end charts ===
Chart (1971)	Rank
US Cash Box Top 100	92
