= Here It Comes Again (The Fortunes song) =

Single by The Fortunes
- B-side: "Things I Should Have Known"
- Released: 10 September 1965
- Genre: Pop
- Label: Decca
- Songwriters: Barry Mason, Les Reed

The Fortunes singles chronology
"You've Got Your Troubles" (1965)	"Here It Comes Again" (1965)	"This Golden Ring" (1966)

"Here It Comes Again" is a song written by Barry Mason and Les Reed in 1965. It was recorded by The Fortunes and released on 10 September 1965. It reached number four on the UK Singles Chart and repeated the feat in Canada. In the US, it reached number 27 on the Billboard Hot 100 chart that same year. It peaked at #6 on the New Zealand Lever Hit Parade

== In popular culture ==
- A version of it was used as a jingle for BBC DJ Tony Brandon in the early 1970s.
