= That Same Old Feeling =

1970 single by Pickettywitch

Single by Pickettywitch

from the album Pickettywitch
- B-side: "Maybe We've Been Loving Too Long"
- Released: 23 January 1970
- Recorded: 1969
- Genre: Pop; bubblegum pop
- Length: 3:02
- Label: Pye 7N 17887, (UK); Janus J-118, (US)
- Songwriters: John Macleod, Tony Macaulay
- Producer: John Macleod

Pickettywitch singles chronology
"You Got Me So I Don't Know" (1969)	"That Same Old Feeling" (1970)	"(It's Like A) Sad Old Kinda Movie" (1970)

"That Same Old Feeling"

Single by The Fortunes

from the album That Same Old Feeling
- B-side: "Sad Sad Sad"; alternate "Lifetime of Love"
- Released: April 1970
- Recorded: 1969
- Genre: Pop
- Length: 2:53
- Label: World Pacific Records 77937
- Songwriters: John Macleod and Tony Macaulay
- Producers: Noel Walker, Billy Davis

The Fortunes US singles chronology
"Fire Brigade" (1968)	"That Same Old Feeling" (1970)	"Here Comes That Rainy Day Feeling Again" (1971)

"That Same Old Feeling" is the title of a pop song composed by John Macleod and Tony Macaulay which in 1970 was a Top Ten UK hit for Pickettywitch, an English band fronted by Polly Brown. In the US the Pickettywitch single vied with a rival version by The Fortunes, with both versions scoring well-enough regionally to reach the Top 70 of the Hot 100, the national hit parade maintained by Billboard magazine.

== The Foundations version ==
The original recording of the song was by The Foundations being featured on the group's final album Digging the Foundations issued in May 1969: like the group's previous three albums Digging the Foundations was produced by John Macleod and Tony Macaulay, consisting largely of their compositions. The Foundations' original version of the song introduced the song's standard chorus but its verses were radically different - musically and lyrically - from those of the later better-known versions.

== The Fortunes' version: background ==
The first evident version of the song in its standard format was that cut by The Fortunes, best known for their hit "You've Got Your Troubles", #2 UK in August 1965: although their hitmaking career had evidently ended by mid-1966 the group had returned to prominence in 1969 via their recording the iconic "It's the Real Thing" jingle for Coca-Cola at the behest of Billy Davis, former Chess Records a&r man turned ad executive, and The Fortunes made their recording of "That Same Old Feeling" - as "Same Old Feeling" - for a 1969 album entitled It's the Real Thing. Produced by Noel Walker - who had overseen The Fortunes' three mid-60s UK chart hits - and Billy Davis, It's the Real Thing was not made available for public purchase or radio airplay, rather being distributed to the Coca-Cola employees who attended a company convention held in Houston. The album reunited The Fortunes' original three vocalists: Rod Allen, Glen Dale, and Barry Pritchard, for the first time since the summer of 1966, when Dale had departed the band.

== Pickettywitch version: background and early success ==
The song's co-writer John Macleod had begun to record Pickettywitch for Pye Records in the summer of 1969, the band's debut single "You Got Me So I Don't Know" being released 25 July 1969: for their second release Macleod had the band record "That Same Old Feeling" with a resultant #5 hit spending five weeks in the Top Ten in March and April 1970: the track also afforded Pickettywitch a hit in Ireland, New Zealand and South Africa with respective chart peaks of #6, #7 and #17.

In 2002, Robin Carmody of Freaky Trigger named it in his list of ten British bubblegum pop "classics", writing that "Like so much Britgum, the imagery here – oak trees, cottages etc. – couldn't be further away from everything pop music is now, and will continue to be." He also described it as "wistful, a kind of bubblegum equivalent of folk-rock if such a thing can be conceived."

== The Fortunes and Pickettywitch versions: North American chart history ==
The UK success of "That Same Old Feeling" by Pickettywitch had prompted The Fortunes to press for the release of their own version as a single for the US market: Coca-Cola and The Fortunes' label United Artists were unable to come to terms on a US single release - although United Artists would give single release to the track in other territories - and by the time the US single release of The Fortunes' "That Same Old Feeling" by World Pacific Records had been negotiated, Janus Records had picked up the Pickettywitch version for US release, with the US singles of "That Same Old Feeling" by both The Fortunes and Pickettywitch being issued in April 1970. Both versions debuted on the Hot 100 in Billboard magazine dated 23 May 1970, The Fortunes' at #93 and Pickettywitch at #98, and neither version would become a major national hit, respective peaks being #62 for The Fortunes and #67 for Pickettywitch, with the Pickettywitch version having a longer chart tenure than The Fortunes': twelve weeks as opposed to eight. Pickettywitch's single also crossed to the Adult Contemporary singles chart (then known as Easy Listening), reaching #34 there, while the Fortunes' single did not.

Both versions of "That Same Old Feeling" fared better on the Top 100 Singles chart in Cashbox magazine, The Fortunes there peaking at #59 while Pickettywitch was there afforded a Top 40 hit as their version peaked at #40 in the issue of Cashbox dated 25 July 1970.

In Canada both the version of "That Same Old Feeling" by Pickettywitch - released there by Pye - and that by The Fortunes - Canadian release on United Artists - charted concurrently on the RPM100 national hit parade, with respective peaks of #36 and #40.

== Chart history ==
The Fortunes

Chart (1970)	Peak position
Canada RPM Top Singles	40
U.S. Billboard Hot 100	62
U.S. Cash Box Top 100	59

Pickettywitch

Chart (1970)	Peak position
Argentina	8
Canada RPM Top Singles	36
Ireland (IRMA)	6
New Zealand (Listener)	7
South Africa (Springbok)	17
UK	5
U.S. Billboard Hot 100	67
U.S. Billboard Easy Listening	34
U.S. Cash Box Top 100	40

== On albums ==
The Fortunes' version was utilized as the title cut of the group's second US album release, following their self-titled debut album in 1965; issued in 1970 That Same Old Feeling featured twelve tracks all from the Fortune's Coca-Cola specialty release It's the Real Thing except that the album That Same Old Feeling replaced the Coca-Cola jingle with the new track "Clowns Exit Laughing". The Pickettywitch version made its album debut in the spring of 1971 with the release of Pickettywitch, the group's sole album release.

== Other versions ==
- The German rendering "Kann ich dich denn nie vergessen" was recorded by Tanja Berg (de) and issued as a single on 30 May 1970.
- In Australia a local cover of "That Same Old Feeling" by session group Candy Apple reached a #25 chart peak in the Go-Set National Top 60 Singles chart in the autumn of 1970: the single was released by Astor Records who were also the label of release for the Pickettywitch version in Australia, where neither the Pickettywitch version nor that by The Fortunes - released by United Artists - charted.
- "That Same Old Feeling" has also been recorded by the Flying Machine (album Down to Earth/ 1970), Liz Damon's Orient Express (album Liz Damon's Orient Express/ 1970)
- The Red Birds (ja) (album Fly With the Red Birds/ 1970)
- Viola Wills (album If You Could Read My Mind/ 1980).
- In November 2019 Australian recording studio artist Fantasy World recorded a new version of “That Same Old Feeling“ (John Macleod/Tony Macaulay) produced by David Wilks, released on DWP Records and available on Apple Music & iTunes. The Fantasy World version features vocals by Vocaloid Cyber Diva, Vocaloid Cyber Songman, Vocaloid Dex.
