= Sherm Feller =

American media personality

- Born: July 29, 1918; Brockton, Massachusetts
- Died: January 27, 1994 (aged 75); Stoughton, Massachusetts
- Occupations: Radio personality, composer
- Spouse: Judy Valentine
- Awards: Boston Red Sox Hall of Fame (2026)

Sherman Feller (July 29, 1918 – January 27, 1994) was an American musical composer and radio personality. He was the public address announcer for the Boston Red Sox at Fenway Park for 26 years.

== Early years ==
Feller was born to Harry and Fannie Feller, both Russian immigrants, in Brockton, Massachusetts. Sherman and his sister were raised in the Roxbury section of Boston, then a predominantly Jewish neighborhood. While census data identified his father as a stitcher in a shoe factory, Feller's father also served as a cantor in a synagogue. Feller graduated from Roxbury Memorial High School and then attended Suffolk College (today Suffolk University), where he began to study law, but left before graduating.

== Pre-Red Sox years ==
Feller decided he wanted to work in radio, beginning in Manchester, New Hampshire at WMUR (now WGIR). His first radio job in greater Boston was in Lowell, where he was hired by WLLH in late 1941. It was there that he met vocalist Judy Valentine, whom he married in 1945. By this time, Feller was not only known as an announcer, but he had begun writing songs, several of which would be sung by Valentine. The duo became known on air as "A Feller and His Girl." By 1948, Feller was on the air in Boston at station WEEI, where he became well known as host of "Club Midnight," and also wrote a music column for the Boston American newspaper Some sources say he was the first Boston announcer to do a call-in talk show, although at that time it was not possible to put callers on the air; instead, announcers would repeat or paraphrase what callers had said. Among the other stations where Feller worked were WLAW in Lawrence, beginning in August 1952, where he did a dance music and interview program. He was also the host of a live program from the station's Boston studio.

After WLAW left the air in the summer of 1953, Feller moved to WVDA in Boston, where he continued to write songs and work as an announcer, frequently interviewing celebrities. Among the famous performers he knew and counted as friends were Frank Sinatra, Nat King Cole and Tommy Dorsey.

While Feller would later become known for his work with the Red Sox, he was a prolific songwriter, credited with writing or cowriting more than 1,000 songs. Among his pop hits were "Snow Snow Beautiful Snow," recorded by Fred Waring; "Francesca," named for his mother and recorded by Arthur Fiedler and the Boston Pops; "She Was Five and He Was Ten," a hit for the Mills Brothers; and "It's Easter Time," recorded by Vaughn Monroe. In the Top 40 era, he became known for a hit he supposedly co-wrote with Tom Jameson in 1958, "Summertime Summertime" by The Jamies. He did not co-write "Summertime, Summertime", as is commonly thought, but took co-writing credit, half of the songwriting royalties, and the publishing rights, as was common practice by managers at the time. Tom Jameson was the sole writer/arranger of "Summertime, Summertime." In addition, Feller composed numerous orchestral works including "Ode to JFK". After becoming the public address announcer for the Red Sox, Feller continued to host a big band-oriented radio program on station WROL from 1970 until 1985.

== Red Sox years ==
Feller served as the Fenway Park public address announcer for 26 years from 1967 until just before his death in early 1994. Feller was known throughout baseball for his distinct voice, which was described as slow with a gravely, measured cadence. Feller attributed his unique sound to the fact that he spoke without his dentures while calling a game. He was also known for keeping his announcements simple, typically saying the batter's uniform number, full name, position and last name when the batter would step up to the plate, such as "Number 26, Wade Boggs. Third base, Boggs." Feller was also known to generations of Red Sox fans for beginning each Red Sox home game with, "Ladies and gentlemen, boys and girls, welcome to Fenway Park." Even long after Feller's death, games broadcast on NESN begin with a sound clip of Feller making this announcement.

Feller was also closely associated with Fenway Park organist John Kiley during his public address announcing career.

Feller was known to be a particular favorite of current ESPN baseball broadcaster Jon Miller who, while serving as the Baltimore Orioles' broadcaster, often impersonated Feller, both on-air and over the Fenway Park public address system.

In early 2026, Feller was name as an inductee to the Boston Red Sox Hall of Fame.

== Personal life ==
Feller married singer and actress Judy Valentine in 1945, and took an active role in promoting and managing her career. Their marriage ended in divorce, and Judy subsequently remarried. He died suddenly at his home in Stoughton, Massachusetts, of heart disease on January 27, 1994, at the age of 75.
