= Tell Me Why (Declan Galbraith song) =

Single by singer Declan Galbrait and a combined children's choir

"Tell Me Why (CD Single)"

Single by Declan Galbraith

from the album Declan
- B-side: "I'll Be There"; "The New Year Song 2003"
- Released: 9 December 2002
- Recorded: 2002
- Genre: Operatic pop
- Label: EMI
- Songwriter(s): Mack, Mason
- Producer(s): Brothers Mack for Xenex Management

Declan Galbraith singles chronology
"Tell Me Why (CD Single)" (2002)	"'Love of My Life'" (2007)

"Tell Me Why" is a single by English singer Declan Galbraith and 83,637 other children.

Released on 9 December 2002, 10 days before his 11th birthday, this was Galbraith's first single. The single reached number 29 on the UK Singles Chart.

== Track listing ==
1. "Tell Me Why (radio edit) featuring the Young Voices"
2. "I'll Be There"
3. "The New Year Song 2003"
4. "Tell Me Why Video"

== World record ==
On 9 December 2002, the largest choir in history, of 83,637, drawn from all parts of the UK and Ireland, joined Declan to sing "Tell Me Why" for a world record, certified by Guinness. The event was organized by 'Young Voices in Concert'. Funds from the record-breaking attempt were donated to the Sargent Cancer Care for Children.
