= The Dreamlovers =

American doo wop group

The Dreamlovers were an American doo wop group from Philadelphia, Pennsylvania.

Formed in 1956, the group took several names early in its career, recording demos as The Romancers and The Midnighters (under which name they backed Chubby Checker on a 1960 recording of "The Twist"). They recorded briefly for V-Tone Records before signing to Heritage Records, who released their 1961 single "When We Get Married". The song reached No. 10 on the US Billboard Hot 100; the next year, their tune "If I Should Lose You" (on End Records) made it to No. 62.

The group remained active well into the 1960s. Their hit "When We Get Married" was covered by The Intruders in 1970 and by Larry Graham in 1980; "You Gave Me Somebody to Love" was a UK hit for Manfred Mann in 1966.

== Members ==
- Morris Gardner – lead
- Don Hogan – lead
- James Dunn – bass
- Clifton Dunn – baritone (died June 22, 2014)
- Tommy Ricks – tenor (deceased)
- Cleveland Hammock – tenor (deceased)
- Douglas Payne – tenor
- Richard "Charley" Brown – baritone
- Earl Worsham – tenor (deceased)

== Discography ==
=== Singles ===
- "For the First Time" / "Take It from a Fool" (1960, Len 1006)
- "Home Is Where the Heart Is" / "Annabelle Lee" (1960, V-Tone 211)
- "Time" / "May I Kiss the Bride" (1961, V-Tone 229)
- "When We Get Married" / "Just Because" (1961, Heritage 102) (US No. 10)
- "Welcome Home" / "Let Them Love" (1961, Heritage 104)
- "Zoom Zoom Zoom" / "While We Were Dancing" (1962, Heritage 107)
- "If I Should Lose You" / "I Miss You" (1962, End 1114) (US No. 62)
- "Together" / "Amazons and Coyotees" (1963, Casino 1308)
- "Together" / "Amazons and Coyotees" (1963, Swan 4167)
- "Sad Sad Boy" / "If I Were a Magician" (1963, Columbia 42698)
- "Black Bottom" / "Sad Sad Boy" (1963, Columbia 42752)
- "Pretty Little Girl" / "I'm Through with You" (1963, Columbia 42842)
- "Oh Baby Mine" / "These Will Be the Good Old Days" (1964, Cameo 326)
- "You Gave Me Somebody to Love" / "Doin' Things Together with You" (1965, Warner Brothers 5619)
- "The Bad Times Make the Good Times" / "Bless Your Soul" (1966, Mercury 72595)
- "Calling Jo-Ann" / "You Gave Me Somebody to Love" (1966, Mercury 72630)

=== LPs ===
- The Bird (& Other Golden Dancing Grooves) (1963, Columbia 8820)
- The Best of the Dreamlovers, Vol. 1 (1980s, Collectibles 5004)
- The Best of the Dreamlovers, Vol. 2 (1980s, Collectibles 5005)

=== CDs ===
- The Best of the Dreamlovers, Vol. 1 (1990, Collectables 5004)
- The Best of the Dreamlovers, Vol. 2 (1990, Collectables 5005)
