= Declan (album) =

Studio album by Declan Galbraith
- Released: 22 September 2002
- Genre: Easy listening
- Length: 53:39
- Label: EMI

Declan Galbraith chronology
Declan (2002)	Thank You (2006)

Singles from Declan
- 1. "Tell Me Why" Released: 9 December 2002

Declan is the debut studio album by singer Declan Galbraith. It was released on 22 September 2002 in the United Kingdom, when Galbraith was only 10 years old.

== Track listing ==
1. "Danny boy" (Frederic E. Weatherly) – 3:29
2. "Carrickfergus" (Alan Connaught, Traditional) – 4:08
3. "Imagine" (John Lennon) – 3:03
4. "I'll be there" (Hal Davis, Berry Gordy, Jr., Bob West) – 4:32
5. "It All Begins With Love" (Mack, Mason) – 4:36
6. "Your Friend" (Mack, Mason) – 4:19
7. "Love can build a bridge" (John, Naomi Judd, Paul Overstreet) – 4:02
8. "Mama Said" (Mack, Mason) – 3:33
9. "Till The Day We Meet Again" (Mack, Mason) – 4:33
10. "Amazing grace" (John Newton) – 3:21
11. "Circles In The Sand" (Mack, Mason) – 3:45
12. "Angels" (Guy Chambers, Robbie Williams) – 4:08
13. "Tell me why" (Mack, Mason) – 4:24
14. "Twinkle twinkle little star (Declan's prayer)" – 1:45

== Unreleased songs ==
- "The New Year Song 2003" Tell Me Why CD Single.
- "For a Better Tomorrow"
- "Walking In the Air" Christmas CD.

== Personnel ==
- Ryan Art – design
- Keith Bessey – mixing, mastering
- Simon Blendis – violin
- Anthony Clark – acoustic guitar, 12-string acoustic guitar
- Mike Drinkwater - keyboards, pre-production, arrangements
- Timothy Eames – percussion, drums, electric guitar, programming, engineering, mixing, Pro-Tools
- Declan Galbraith – vocals
- Jan Hendrickse – flute, whistling
- Mark Hornby – acoustic guitar, nylon string guitar
- Tom Howard – photography
- Stephen Hussey – violin, conducting, orchestration, string arrangements, orchestral arrangements
- Dominic Kelly – oboe, cor anglais
- Nathan King – acoustic guitar, electric guitar, nylon string guitar
- Noel Langley – trumpet, Flugelhorn
- Sara Loewenthal – copyist
- Barry Mason – arrangements, executive production
- Craig McLeish – conducting
- Tom Norris – leader
- Catherine Porter – background vocals
- Jim Rattigan – French horn
- Rowland Sutherland – flute
- Roy Theaker – violin, leader
- Urban Soul Orchestra – orchestra
- Lucy Wakeford – harp
- Chris Worsey – cello
