= Pickettywitch =

UK musical group

- Origin: United Kingdom
- Genres: Pop music
- Years active: 1969–1973
- Label: Pye Records
- Past members: Polly Brown; Chris Warren; Bob Brittain; Martin Bridges; Mike Tomich; Keith Hall; Peter Hawkins; Brian Stuart; Mel Harris; Paul Risi; Paul Riordan

Pickettywitch were a British pop group. Fronted by singer Polly Brown (also billed as Polly Browne), with Chris Warren as the secondary lead singer. The group became best known for the hit single, "That Same Old Feeling", which was written by Tony Macaulay and John Macleod. It reached number five in the UK Singles Chart in 1970.

== Origins ==
The original members were Polly Brown (vocals), Chris Warren (vocals), Bob Brittain (organ), Martin Bridges (guitar), Mike Tomich (bass guitar) and Keith Hall (drums). Bridges and Tomich were replaced later in 1970 by Peter Hawkins (died 18 October 2014) (guitar) and Brian Stuart (bass), who would later be replaced by Paul Risi (died in 2025) (guitar) and Paul Riordan (bass). The name Pickettywitch is often said to have been taken from a village in Cornwall through which their eventual lead singer, Polly Brown, had passed with her sister; in fact, there is no such village, though there was a pub of that name at Yeovil in Somerset.

== History ==
Pickettywitch was signed by record producer John Macleod to Pye Records and released their debut single, "You Got Me So I Don't Know" b/w "Solomon Grundy" in July 1969. Their U.K. chart breakthrough came in early 1970 when the single "That Same Old Feeling" hit the top 5. That single also made the top 40 on the Cashbox pop chart in the US a few months later and remains their only hit single there.

Two further singles also made the UK chart in that year - these were "(It's Like A) Sad Old Kinda Movie" (again written by Macaulay and Macleod) (number 16), and "Baby I Won't Let You Down" (written by Les Reed and Geoff Stephens) (number 27).

In 1970, "Days I Remember" received radio airplay. The single did not appear on record charts, but "That Same Old Feeling" reached No. 67 on the Billboard Hot 100 and No. 40 on the Cashbox pop chart in the summer of that same year. Brown left for a solo career in late 1972.

== Subsequent careers ==
Brown went on to a form a duo called Sweet Dreams, in partnership with Tony Jackson, recording a cover of the ABBA song "Honey, Honey". Brown then launched a solo career, with minor hits in the UK and the United States. Hall joined Gerry & the Pacemakers for five years, and has an active international career as a jazz drummer.

Brown continues to write and record music including blues material. There is a misconception that she died in 2006, due to the death that year of Sheila Rossall, who had been the lead singer of a latter-day edition of Pickettywitch who worked the club circuit. Rossall had attracted some publicity in 1981 because she suffered from total allergy syndrome, and Brown often faced questions about the illness as a result.

== Albums ==
- Pickettywitch (Janus Records, 1970, LP)
- That Same Old Feeling: The Complete Recordings (Castle Records, 2001, CD)

== Singles ==
- "That Same Old Feeling" (1970) - UK No. 5, Ireland No. 6, NZ No. 7, Argentina No. 8 South Africa No. 17, Canada No. 36, US No. 67
- "(It's Like a) Sad Old Kinda Movie" (1970) - UK No. 16
- "Baby I Won't Let You Down" (1970) - UK No. 27
- "Waldo P. Emerson Jones" (1971) - Canada No. 83
