= Congress Records =

American record label

Congress Records was an American record label founded in 1962 by Neil Galligan, who headed Canadian-American Records and brought with him Linda Scott from that label. The label was sold the following year to Kapp Records. Under Kapp, the most successful artist was Shirley Ellis. Kapp rendered Congress inactive in 1966. Kapp, including the Congress catalogue, was sold to MCA in 1967. MCA reactivated Congress in 1969. The most successful act for this incarnation of Congress was the Flying Machine. Another notable act on Congress was Elton John but after a couple of unsuccessful singles on Congress, the label was discontinued in 1970 with Congress acts transferred to other MCA labels. Elton John was transferred to Uni Records where he started having hits.
