= Geoff Turton =

British singer (born 1944)

- Also known as: Jefferson
- Born: Geoffrey Turton; 11 March 1944 (age 82)
- Origin: Birmingham, England
- Years active: 1960s–present
- Label: Pye/Pye Piccadilly
- Member of: The Rockin' Berries

Geoffrey Turton (born 11 March 1944, Birmingham, England), who also recorded under the name Jefferson, is a British singer. His musical career began as the falsettist lead singer and rhythm guitarist of The Rockin' Berries in 1961, which had a number of hits in the UK and Europe. The group was best known for its covers, and Turton did much of the searching and decision work as to what was to be sung.

When the group broke up in 1968 Turton started a solo career, releasing a single "Don't You Believe It" on Piccadilly Records. It flopped, and Piccadilly head John Schroeder suggested that Turton change his name to Jefferson. At that time, Turton recorded the original version of "Love Grows (Where My Rosemary Goes)" (unreleased). The single "Montage" failed to chart, but its follow-up "The Colour of My Love" was a hit in the UK (peaking at No. 22 in the UK Singles Chart) and the United States (reaching No. 68 on the Billboard Hot 100), and an LP was issued following its success. A third single, "Baby Take Me in Your Arms", was not a hit in the UK but cracked the Top 30 in the U.S. (No. 23) and Canada (No. 15), justifying the release of a North American album. At the time of this single's success, Turton was hurt in a car crash, and so he did not make any live appearances. After a six-month hospital stay, Turton recorded a second which was never released by his label Pye Records, and his career stalled in the UK. He began touring the U.S., where he was still able to get gigs based on the success of "Baby Take Me in Your Arms". He then secured a recording contract with Polygram Records, released another album and the single "I Love You This Much" (later covered by Mouth & MacNeal on the album Pocket Full of Hits).

He resumed under his given name when The Rockin' Berries reunited in the late 1970s, and toured with them (as well as doing solo shows in the UK) into the 1990s. In 2001, Castle Records released The Colour of My Love -- The Pye Anthology, a CD composed of his 1969 album The Colour of My Love plus much of his previously unreleased Pye material.

== See also ==
- List of 1970s one-hit wonders in the United States
