= The Flying Machine (band) =

British band

- Origin: Rugby, Warwickshire, England
- Genres: Bubblegum pop
- Years active: 1969–1971
- Labels: Pye Records (UK); Congress (US); Janus (US)
- Past members: Tony Newman; Steve Jones; Sam Kempe; Stuart Colman; Paul Wilkinson; Troy Adam Jones; Martyn "Stalky" Gleeson

The Flying Machine were a British bubblegum pop band who are best known for their 1969 American No. 5 hit, "Smile a Little Smile for Me".

== Career ==
The Flying Machine descended from British band Pinkerton's Assorted Colours. Pinkerton's (as they were often known) had scored a major UK hit with "Mirror Mirror" in 1966 and continued recording over the next few years. However, by 1969, singer/guitarist Tony Newman, singer/autoharpist/original frontman Sam Kempe, and bassist Stuart Colman from Pinkerton's had teamed up with lead guitarist Steve Jones and drummer Paul Wilkinson to form a new iteration of the group and, with Newman now assuming lead vocal/frontman duties, took the name the Flying Machine.

They are best known for their single in 1969, "Smile a Little Smile for Me", which peaked at No. 5 on the U.S. Billboard Hot 100 chart (on Kapp Records' Congress record label). It also reached No. 6 on the AC chart. Their first LP, which was self-titled, was released by Janus Records in 1969. By 12 December that year the single had sold a million copies and was awarded a gold disc by the R.I.A.A. The song was written by Tony Macaulay and Geoff Stephens. Despite being released by Pye Records in the band's native UK, the record did not appear on the UK Singles Chart.

A follow-up single, a version of "Baby Make It Soon", first recorded by Marmalade, achieved the U.S. Hot 100 the following year. A final single, "The Devil Has Possession Of Your Mind", was released, after which the Flying Machine split up.

Bassist Colman went on to a successful career as a session musician, record producer and BBC Radio disc jockey.

== Band members ==
- Tony Newman (born 1947, Rugby, Warwickshire, England) – lead vocals, guitars
- Steve Jones (born 1946, Coventry) – lead guitars, vocals
- Sam Kempe (born 1946, Rugby) – vocals (had apparently left the band by the time their first album was released, as he is not featured on the cover)
- Stuart Colman (born Ian Stuart Colman, 19 December 1944, Harrogate, Yorkshire; died 19 April 2018) – bass, electric piano
- Paul Wilkinson (born 1948, Coventry) – drums

=== Ancillary members ===
- Edie Andrews (born 1945, Detroit, Michigan) – background vocals
- Mark Lansing (born 1952, USA) - guitars, sideman courtesy of Warner Bros. Records, 1969
- Troy Adam Jones (birth year unknown) - guitarist, backup drummer

== Discography ==
=== Albums ===
- 1969: The Flying Machine (Janus) - No. 179 U.S.
- 1970: Down to Earth with the Flying Machine (Pye)
- 1998: Flight Recorder - From Pinkerton's (Assort.) Colours to the Flying Machine (double CD compilation album on Sequel Records)

=== Singles ===
- 1969: "Smile a Little Smile for Me" b/w "Maybe We've Been Loving Too Long" - No. 5 U.S.
- 1969: "Baby Make It Soon" b/w "There She Goes" - No. 87 U.S.
- 1969: "Send My Baby Home Again" b/w "Look At Me Look At Me"
- 1970: "Hanging on the Edge of Sadness" b/w "Flying Machine"
- 1970: "The Devil Has Possession of Your Mind" b/w "Hey Little Girl"
- 1970: "Yes I Understand" b/w "Pages of Your Life"

== See also ==
- List of 1960s one-hit wonders in the United States
