= Tony Macaulay =

- Born: Anthony Gordon Instone; 21 April 1944 (age 82); Fulham, London, England
- Genre: Pop
- Occupations: Record producer, composer, songwriter, author
- Years active: 1967–2000s
- Website: tonymacaulay.com

Tony Macaulay (born Anthony Gordon Instone; 21 April 1944) is an English author, composer for musical theatre, and songwriter. Macaulay's best-known songs include "Baby Now That I've Found You" and "Build Me Up Buttercup" by the Foundations, as well as "Love Grows (Where My Rosemary Goes)" by Edison Lighthouse and "Don't Give Up on Us" by David Soul.

== Early life ==
Macaulay was born in Fulham, London, England. His great-grandparents were Jews from Bavaria, Germany. His great-uncle, Samuel Instone, founded Instone Air Line. They surnames were originally Einstein, but in shortly after the First World War broke out in 1914, his grandfather, Gustave, and his three brothers, Samuel, Alfred and Theodore, changed their names to Instone to hide their German heritage.

Tony's father, Gordon, was listed as "Missing, presumed dead" after he was at the Battle of Dunkirk, but had actually been captured, but returned to Britain in April 1941, and was later awarded the Military Medal.

He studied engineering at a college in Brighton. While at college, Macaulay joined his first band, Saracons, in which he was the bass player, but he was kicked out of the band before they even did their first gig. According to Macaulay, the only job he ever had before music was "designing sewage treatment plants".

== Career ==
In the early 1960s, he worked as a song plugger for Essex Publishing, then moved to Pye Records as a record producer. It was here that he had his first major success with the Foundations, when they recorded "Baby Now That I've Found You", a song he had co-written with John Macleod, and it topped the UK Singles Chart in November 1967. The next song he wrote with Macleod, "Let the Heartaches Begin", was written for Long John Baldry, and not only went to number one in the UK, but also knocked "Baby Now That I've Found You" off the number one spot, and according to Macaulay, "I am the only writer in history to knock his own number one off with another number one".

Much of his attention in the early 1970s was diverted by a protracted legal dispute with his publishers. He won his case on appeal in 1974, in a landmark decision which encouraged other artists to challenge the terms of their contracts. By this time he had begun to turn his back on writing pop songs and started to write for musical theatre. His first collaborations for the stage were with the playwright Ken Hill on Is Your Doctor Really Necessary? in 1973, and on Gentlemen Prefer Anything the following year.

He composed the scores to the films The Beast in the Cellar (1970) and Percy's Progress (1974), and was the music co-ordinator for the film Never Too Young to Rock (1975).

Sometime between 1974 and 1977, Macaulay moved to Los Angeles, to begin a career in Hollywood. It was while in Californina that Macaulay had a downfall in writing hit songs, going as long as eighteen months without writing a popular song, but had a comeback in 1977 when he wrote "Silver Lady" for actor David Soul, although Macaulay later revealed "I really like it but didn’t think it would be a hit". Also in 1977, he wrote "Can't We Just Sit Down (And Talk It Over)" for Donna Summer, but as more and more artists were writing their own material, Macaulay withdrew from the songwriting industry and for a while worked in Carpentry.

He wrote the music for Windy City, a musical in two acts based on The Front Page by Ben Hecht and Charles MacArthur, with book and lyrics by Dick Vosburgh, which was premiered on stage in 1982. Macaulay briefly returned to songwriting with "Alibis" from the Sergio Mendes 1984 album, Confetti. In the 1990s, Macaulay wrote several thrillers.

He is a past chairman of The Society of Distinguished Songwriters, a secret society for British songwriters founded by Mitch Murray in 1971.

When speaking about the modern music industry in 2025, Macaulay said: "It’s a very lonely business these days. In my day, you went into the studio with other human beings and created. You did all the deals, and you tried to get it on air. Now you get a few hundred quid’s worth of equipment in your bedroom and you can produce a completely finished record and send it as a file to a record company. You might meet the record company once and it either become a hit or it doesn’t. I think it’s a pity because I enjoyed the camaraderie of it all."

== Personal life ==
Macaulay splits his time between Brighton and Cocoa Beach, Florida with his wife Sarah. His hobbies include History, Art and Carpentry.

== Awards and honours ==
- Macaulay has won the British Academy of Songwriters, Composers and Authors Award twice as 'Songwriter of the Year' (1970 and 1977).
- He is a nine time Ivor Novello Award winning songwriter.
- In 2007, he became the only British person to win the Edwin Forrest Award for outstanding contribution to the American theatre.
- In January 2025, he was given an honorary Doctorate of Music by the University of Sussex.
- In June 2025, Macaulay was inducted into the Songwriters Hall of Fame.

== Songs written ==
Songs where Macaulay is the sole songwriter credited

- "Baby Make It Soon" — Marmalade (1969)
- "(Last Night) I Didn't Get to Sleep at All" — The 5th Dimension (1972)
- "Don't Give Up on Us" — David Soul (1976)
- "Falling Apart at the Seams" — Marmalade (1976)
- "Can't We Just Sit Down (And Talk It Over)" — Donna Summer (1977)
- "Alibis" — Sérgio Mendes (1984)

Songs Macaulay co-wrote with John Macleod

- "Baby Now That I've Found You" — The Foundations (1967)
- "Let the Heartaches Begin" — Long John Baldry (1967)
- "Something Here in My Heart (Keeps A Tellin' Me No)" — Paper Dolls (1968)
- "That Same Old Feeling" — The Foundations (1969)

Songs Macaulay co-wrote with Mike d'Abo

- "Build Me Up Buttercup" — The Foundations (1968)

Songs Macaulay co-wrote with Geoff Stephens

- "Lights of Cincinnati" — Scott Walker (1969)
- "Smile a Little Smile for Me" — The Flying Machine (1969)
- "Sorry Suzanne" — The Hollies (1969)
- "You Won't Find Another Fool Like Me" — The New Seekers (1973)
- "Silver Lady" — David Soul (1977)

Songs Macaulay co-wrote with Barry Mason

- "Love Grows (Where My Rosemary Goes)" — Edison Lighthouse (1970)

Songs Macaulay co-wrote with Roger Cook and Roger Greenaway

- "Blame It on the Pony Express" — Johnny Johnson and the Bandwagon (1970)
- "Home Lovin' Man" — Andy Williams (1970)
- "Here Comes That Rainy Day Feeling Again" — The Fortunes (1971)
