= Sharon O'Neill discography =

Discography of New Zealand singer

- Studio albums: 6
- EPs: 2
- Live albums: 1
- Compilation albums: 4

The discography of New Zealand singer Sharon O'Neill consists of six studio albums, one live album and four compilations. In 2023, her single "Maxine" was certified gold in New Zealand.

== Albums ==
=== Studio albums ===
Title	Details	Peak chart positions		Certifications
Title	Details	NZ	AUS	Certifications
This Heart This Song	Released: February 1979; Label: CBS Records; Catalogue: 003	12	—	
Sharon O'Neill	Released: February 1980; Label: CBS; Catalogue: SBP237350; released as Words in Australia	3	66	
Maybe	Released: October 1981; Label: CBS; Catalogue: SBP237604	7	44	
Foreign Affairs	Released: May 1983; Label: CBS; Catalogue: SBP 237889	12	17	RMNZ: Gold
Danced in the Fire	Released: October 1987; Label: Polydor; Catalogue: 833557-1	—	45	
Edge of Winter	Released: August 1990; Label: Polydor; Catalogue: 843883-1	—	147	
"—" denotes a recording that did not chart or was not released in that territory.

=== Live albums ===
Title	Details	Peak chart positions	Certifications
Title	Details	NZ	Certifications
Live in Paradise (with When the Cat's Away)	Label: EMI; Catalogue: 07243 537030 2 8	7	RMNZ: Platinum

=== Compilation albums ===
Title	Album details	Chart peak positions	
Title	Album details	NZ	AUS
So Far	Released: 1984; Label: J&B; Catalogue: JB253	—	89
The Very Best of Collette and Sharon O'Neill (with Collette)	Released: 1991; Label: J&B; Catalogue: JB477CD	—	366
The Best of Sharon O'Neill	Released: September 2005; Label: Sony BMG; Catalogue: 82876727862	—	—
Words: The Very Best of Sharon O'Neill	Released: 14 April 2014; Label: Sony Music (NZ); Catalogue: 88843069442	6	—

=== Box set ===
Title	Details
Original Album Classics (4-CD box set containing the albums: This Heart This Song / Sharon O'Neill / Maybe / Foreign Affairs)	Released: 2013; Label: Sony Music (NZ); Catalogue: 88883787452

== Extended plays ==
Title	Details
Smash Palace	Released: 1982; Label: CBS; Catalogue: SBP237751
Four Play: Volume 18	Released: 1988; Label: CBS; Catalogue: BA651092-7

== Singles ==
Year	Title	Peak chart positions		Album
Year	Title	NZ	AUS	Album
1972	"Love Song"	—	—	non album single
1978	"Luck's on Your Table"	27	—	This Heart This Song
1979	"Don't Say No to Tomorrow" (Telethon song)	6	—	non album single
1979	"Words"	22	56	Sharon O'Neill
1979	"Baby Don't Fight"	—	—	Sharon O'Neill
1980	"Don't Let Love Go" (duet with Jon Stevens)	5	—	non album single
1980	"Asian Paradise"	24	76	Sharon O'Neill
1980	"How Do You Talk to Boys"	26	25	Sharon O'Neill
1981	"Waiting for You"	—	50	Maybe
1981	"Maybe"	12	38	Maybe
1982	"For All the Tea in China"	—	98	Maybe
1983	"Losing You"	—	26	Foreign Affairs
1983	"Maxine"	16	16	Foreign Affairs
1983	"Danger"	—	78	Foreign Affairs
1984	"Power"	—	36	non album single
1985	"Just Friends"	—	—	non album single
1987	"Physical Favours"	25	39	Danced in the Fire
1988	"Danced in the Fire"	—	98	Danced in the Fire
1988	"Shock to the Heart"/"We're Only Human"	—	—	Danced in the Fire
1989	"Water for the Flowers" (shared single with Doug Parkinson)	—	—	non album single
1990	"Satin Sheets"	—	106	Edge of Winter
1991	"Poster Girl"	—	—	Edge of Winter
2018	"Young Years" (with Ben Ransom)	—	—	non album single
2020	"Not Pretty Enough" (with Aly Cook)	—	—	non album single
"—" denotes a recording that did not chart or was not released in that territory.

=== Other singles ===
List of singles as featured artist, with selected chart positions
Year	Title	Peak chart positions
Year	Title	AUS
1985	"The Garden" (as part of Australia Too)	38
