= Words: The Very Best of Sharon O'Neill =

Greatest hits album by Sharon O'Neill
- Released: 18 April 2014
- Recorded: 1978–1990
- Genre: Pop, rock, synthpop
- Label: Sony Music New Zealand

Sharon O'Neill chronology
The Best of Sharon O'Neill (2005)	Words: The Very Best of Sharon O'Neill (2014)

Words: The Very Best of Sharon O'Neill is the fourth compilation album from New Zealand pop singer Sharon O'Neill. The album was released by Sony Music New Zealand on 18 April 2014.

== Track listing ==
No.	Title	Writer(s)	Album	Length
1.	"Words"	O'Neill	Sharon O'Neill	3:18
2.	"Maxine"	O'Neill	Foreign Affairs	4:36
3.	"Asian Paradise"	O'Neill	Sharon O'Neill	5:06
4.	"Luck's on Your Table"	O'Neill	This Heart This Song	3:13
5.	"Don't Say No to Tomorrow"	O'Neill	non-album single	3:27
6.	"Baby Don’t Fight"	O'Neill	Sharon O'Neill	3:25
7.	"Smash Palace"	O’Neill	Smash Palace	4:40
8.	"How Do You Talk to Boys"	Steve Kipner, Tim Seufert	Sharon O'Neill	3:06
9.	"Danced in the Fire"	O'Neill	Danced in the Fire	4:03
10.	"Maybe"	O'Neill	Maybe	3:31
11.	"Danger"	O'Neill	Foreign Affairs	4:10
12.	"Physical Favours"	O'Neill, Alan Mansfield	Danced in the Fire	4:37
13.	"Don't Let Love Go" (with Jon Stevens)	Brenda Russell, Brian Russell	non-album single	4:02
14.	"Losing You"	O'Neill	Foreign Affairs	3:48
15.	"Power"	O'Neill	non-album single	3:57
16.	"For All the Tea in China"	O'Neill	Maybe	3:21
17.	"Any Time You Want"	O'Neill	Maybe	3:23
18.	"Radio Lover"	O'Neill	Foreign Affairs	3:49
19.	"Waiting for You"	O'Neill	Maybe	3:28
20.	"Face in a Rainbow"	O'Neill	This Heart This Song	5:14

== Charts ==
Chart (2014)	Peak position
New Zealand Albums (RMNZ)	6

== Release history ==
Region	Date	Format	Label	Catalogue
New Zealand	18 April 2014	CD; digital download	Sony Music New Zealand	272454
Australia	18 April 2014	digital download	Sony Music New Zealand	—
