= The Best of Sharon O'Neill =

Greatest hits album by Sharon O'Neill
- Released: 4 September 2005
- Recorded: 1979–2001
- Genre: Pop, rock, synthpop
- Label: Sony Music Australia

Sharon O'Neill chronology
Live in Paradise (2001)	The Best of Sharon O'Neill (2005)	Words: The Very Best of Sharon O'Neill (2014)

The Best of Sharon O'Neill is the third compilation album from New Zealand pop singer Sharon O'Neill. The album features 18 of O'Neill's greatest hits in chronological order. The album was released by Sony Music Australia on 4 September 2005.

On the album sleeve O'Neill wrote: "Now I feel is the perfect time to look back on all the wonderful projects I've been involved with and I hope those of you who have shared my journey will enjoy this collection and its diversity".

== Background and release ==
Sharon O'Neill was one of the biggest pop/rock artists of the late 1970s and early 1980s in New Zealand and Australia. This album is the first ever comprehensive overview of O'Neill's recording career with tracks from all three labels, CBS, Polygram Records and ABC.

The album was released to coincide with O'Neill supporting role in Leo Sayer's concert series.

== Track listing ==
No.	Title	Writer(s)	Album	Length
1.	"Words"	Sharon O'Neill	Sharon O'Neill	3:18
2.	"How Do You Talk to Boys"	Steve Kipner, Tim Seufert	Sharon O'Neill	3:06
3.	"Asian Paradise"	O'Neill	Sharon O'Neill	5:06
4.	"Baby Don't Fight"	O'Neill	Sharon O'Neill	3:25
5.	"Waiting for You"	O'Neill	Maybe	4:36
6.	"Maybe"	O'Neill	Maybe	3:31
7.	"For All the Tea in China"	O'Neill	Maybe	3:21
8.	"Smash Palace"	O’Neill	Smash Palace	4:40
9.	"Hold On Love"	O’Neill	Smash Palace	5:32
10.	"Losing You"	O'Neill	Foreign Affairs	3:48
11.	"Maxine"	O'Neill	Foreign Affairs	4:36
12.	"Danger"	O'Neill	Foreign Affairs	4:10
13.	"Power"	O'Neill	non-album single	3:57
14.	"Physical Favours"	O'Neill, Alan Mansfield	Danced in the Fire	4:37
15.	"Danced in the Fire"	O'Neill	Danced in the Fire	4:03
16.	"Water for The Flowers"	O'Neill	non-album single	3:21
17.	"Satin Sheets"	O'Neill, Mansfield	Edge of Winter	3:59
18.	"Maxine" (live)	O'Neill	Live in Paradise	4:59

== Release history ==
Region	Date	Format	Label	Catalogue
Australia	4 September 2005	CD	Sony Music Australia	82876727862
