= The Very Best of Collette and Sharon O'Neill =

Compilation album by Collette and Sharon O'Neill
- Released: 2 December 1991
- Genres: Pop, electronic, synthpop
- Labels: J&B Records

Collette chronology
Attitude (1991)	The Very Best of Collette and Sharon O'Neill (1991)

Sharon O'Neill chronology
Edge of Winter (1990)	The Very Best of Collette and Sharon O'Neill (1991)	Live in Paradise (2001)

The Very Best of Collette and Sharon O'Neill is a combined compilation album from New Zealand born, Australian pop singer Collette and New Zealand pop singer Sharon O'Neill. It was Collette's first compilation album and O'Neill's second. The album was released on CBS Records' budget label J&B. The album received little promotion and was a commercial failure, failing to chart.

The album was notable as it included the O'Neill track "Power", marking the first time it was included on an album.

== Track listing ==
CD/Cassette (JB477CD)

1. "Upside Down"
2. "Who Do You Think You Are"
3. "Ring My Bell"
4. "That's What I Like About You"
5. "Victim of the Groove"
6. "Push"
7. "Hothouse"
8. "Only You Can Do It"
9. "Danger"
10. "Maxine"
11. "Losing You"
12. "Waiting for You"
13. "Asian Paradise"
14. "For All the Tea in China"
15. "Words"
16. "Power"

Note

- Tracks 1–8 are performed by Collette. Tracks 9–16 are performed by Sharon O'Neill.
