= So Far (Sharon O'Neill album) =

Compilation album by Sharon O'Neill
- Released: 1984
- Recorded: 1978–1983
- Genres: Pop, rock, synthpop
- Labels: J&B Records

Sharon O'Neill chronology
Foreign Affairs (1983)	So Far (1984)	Danced in the Fire (1987)

So Far is the first compilation album from New Zealand pop singer Sharon O'Neill. The album was released on CBS Records' budget label J&B. The album was released during a period of legal dispute between O'Neill and CBS.

== Track listing ==
Vinyl/cassette (JB 253)

Side A

1. "Losing You" (O'Neill)
2. "How Do You Talk to Boys" (Steve Kipner, T Seufert)
3. "Radio Lover" (O'Neill)
4. "Words" (O'Neill)
5. "For All the Tea in China" (O'Neill)
6. "Baby Don't Fight" (O'Neill)
7. "Asian Paradise" (O'Neill)

Side B

1. "Maxine" (O'Neill)
2. "Street Boys" (O'Neill)
3. "Danger" (O'Neill)
4. "Waiting for You" (O'Neill)
5. "Luck's on Your Table" (O'Neill)
6. "Any Time You Want" (O'Neill)
7. "Maybe" (O'Neill)

== Charts ==
The album made it Kent Music Report debut in August 1986, two years after it was released.

Chart (1986)	Peak position
Australia (Kent Music Report)	89
