= Live in Paradise =

Live album by When the Cat's Away and Sharon O'Neill
- Released: November 2001
- Recorded: 2001
- Label: EMI Music

When the Cat's Away and Sharon O'Neill chronology
| When the Cat's Away (1987) | Live in Paradise (2001) |

Sharon O'Neill chronology
| The Very Best of Collette and Sharon O'Neill (1991) | Live in Paradise (2001) | The Best of Sharon O'Neill (2005) |

Live in Paradise is the second live album from New Zealand female vocal group When the Cat's Away with Sharon O'Neill.

== Background and release ==
After the group's split in 1990, they decided to reform in 2001, minus original member Dianne Swan. The group contacted fellow New Zealand singer Sharon O'Neill and released a cover version of her 1980 single "Asian Paradise", which peaked at number 16, surpassing O'Neill's solo peak position. A tour commenced in September 2001 and an album was recorded and released as Live in Paradise in November 2001.

== Track listing ==
CD (EMI – 537030)
| No. | Title | Writer(s) | Vocals | Length |
|---|---|---|---|---|
| 1. | "Game of Love" | Wayne Fontana | all | 3:47 |
| 2. | "Yesterday Was Just the Beginning of My Life" | Harry Vanda and George Young | Kim Willoughby | 4:17 |
| 3. | "Room That Echoes" | Neville Hall | Margaret Urlich | 3:36 |
| 4. | "Anyone Who Had a Heart" | Burt Bacharach, Hal David | Debbie Harwood | 3:37 |
| 5. | "Escaping" | Barry Blue, Robyn Smith | Margaret Urlich | 5:02 |
| 6. | "Southern Moonlight" | Rockinghorse | Kim Willoughby | 3:36 |
| 7. | "What's The Time Mr Wolf?" | Hareruia Abraham | Annie Crummer | 4:42 |
| 8. | "Asian Paradise" | Sharon O'Neill | all | 5:37 |
| 9. | "Words" | O'Neill | O'Neill | 3:13 |
| 10. | "Maxine" | O'Neill | O'Neill | 4:59 |
| 11. | "Danced in the Fire" | O'Neill | O'Neill | 4:39 |
| 12. | "I Hope I Never" | Tim Finn | Debbie Harwood | 7:13 |
| 13. | "Lady Marmalade" | Bob Crewe, Kenny Nolan | all | 4:39 |
| 14. | "It's Raining Men" | Paul Jabara, Paul Shaffer | all | 4:52 |
| 15. | "Melting Pot" | Roger Cook | all | 5:29 |
| 16. | "Blue Lady" | Graham Brazier | Debbie Harwood | 4:58 |

== Personnel ==
- Tim Robertson - bass
- Mickey Ututaonga - drums
- Rob Galley - guitar
- Alan Mansfield - keyboards
- Barbara Griffin - keyboards

== Charts ==
| Chart (2001/02) | Peak position |
|---|---|
| New Zealand Albums (RMNZ) | 7 |

== Certifications ==
| Country | Certification |
|---|---|
| New Zealand | Platinum |
