= When the Cat's Away =

When the Cat's Away may refer to:

- When the Cat's Away (1929 film), a 1929 Mickey Mouse cartoon
- When the Cat's Away (1935 film), a 1935 Happy Harmonies cartoon
- When the Cat's Away (1996 film), a French drama directed by Cédric Klapisch
- When the Cat's Away (band), a New Zealand female vocal group.
  - When the Cat's Away (album), a 1987 live album
- "When the Cat's Away" (The Brothers Garcia), an episode of The Brothers Garcia
- "When the Cat's Away" (Desmond's), an episode of Desmond's
- "When the Cat's Away" (Romeo!), an episode of Romeo!
- When the Cat's Away, an unproduced screenplay co-written by Cara Buono
- When the Cat's Away (Tunnels & Trolls), a 1993 adventure for role-playing game Tunnels & Trolls
