= Darren Briais =

Australian DJ

Darren Briais is an Australian DJ.

The single "I Feel It" by DJ Darren Briais vs. DJ Peewee Ferris was nominated for the ARIA Award for Best Dance Release and reached #20 on the ARIA singles chart.

== Discography ==
=== Singles ===
Title	Year	Peak chart positions
Title	Year	AUS
"I Feel It" (as DJ Darren Briais vs. DJ Peewee Ferris)	1995	20
"Do It" (as DJ Darren Briais vs. DJ Peewee Ferris)	1996	—

== Awards and nominations ==
=== ARIA Music Awards ===
The ARIA Music Awards is an annual awards ceremony that recognises excellence, innovation, and achievement across all genres of Australian music.

Year	Nominee / work	Award	Result
1996	"I Feel It"	Best Dance Release	Nominated
