= All I Wanna Do Is Dance =

Single by Collette

from the album Raze the Roof
- B-side: "Push"
- Released: 3 July 1989
- Recorded: Studios 301, Sydney
- Genre: Pop
- Length: 3:29
- Label: CBS Records
- Songwriter(s): Collette Roberts, Pee Wee Ferris
- Producer(s): Kirke Godfrey, Pee Wee Ferris

Collette singles chronology
"Ring My Bell" (1989)	"All I Wanna Do Is Dance" (1989)	"That's What I Like About You" (1989)

"All I Wanna Do Is Dance" is a song written and recorded by New Zealand born, Australian pop singer Collette. It was released in July 1989 as the second single from her debut studio album, Raze the Roof (1989). The song peaked at number 12 on the ARIA Charts. In June 2019, an electro house remix was released in celebration of the song's 30th anniversary.

== Track listing ==
7" (CBS 655047)

- Side A "All I Wanna Do Is Dance" - 3:29
- Side B "Push" - 3:17

12"

- Side A1 "All I Wanna Do Is Dance" (Land of the Giants Mix) - 5:47
- Side A2 "All I Wanna Do Is Dance" (Stomp Mix) - 5:31
- Side B1 "Push" (Stretch Mix) - 5:30
- Side B2 "Push" (Revenge Mix) - 5:12

== Charts ==
Chart (1989)	Peak position
Australia (ARIA)	12
New Zealand (Recorded Music NZ)	21
