= Raze the Roof =

Studio album by Collette
- Released: 30 October 1989
- Genre: Pop, electronic, Hi NRG, synthpop,
- Label: CBS Records
- Producer: Kirke Godfrey, Peewee Ferris

Collette chronology
Raze the Roof (1989)	Attitude (1991)

Singles from Raze the Roof
- 1. "Ring My Bell" Released: 27 February 1989; 2. "All I Wanna Do Is Dance" Released: 3 July 1989; 3. "That's What I Like About You" Released: 16 October 1989

Raze the Roof is the debut studio album by New Zealand born Australian pop singer, Collette. Raze the Roof was released in October 1989 and peaked at No. 48 in Australia. The album spawned three top forty singles.

The album was made available on digital platforms online in November 2019.

== Track listing ==
1. "That's What I Like About You". Written by Collette Roberts. 3:21.
2. "Ring My Bell". Written by F. Knight. 3:34.
3. "You Ain't Gonna Hold Me Back". Written by Collette Roberts, Peewee Ferris. 3:54.
4. "Victim of the Groove". Written by Collette Roberts, Peewee Ferris. 4:38.
5. "Push". Written by Collette Roberts, Peewee Ferris. 3:37.
6. "All I Wanna Do Is Dance". Written by Collette Roberts, Peewee Ferris. 3:29.
7. "Ordinary Man". Written by Peter "Reggie" Bowman. 3:33.
8. "Party Time". Written by Collette Roberts, Kirke Godfrey. 3:42.
9. "Only You Can Do It". 3:37.
10. "Hothouse". Written by Collette Roberts, Peewee Ferris. 4:17.
11. "Save Yourself". Written by Collette Roberts, Peewee Ferris. 4:06.
12. "All I Wanna Do Is Dance" (Stomp Mix). Written by Collette Roberts, Peewee Ferris. 5:32.

"Save Yourself" and the Stomp Mix of "All I Wanna Do is Dance" were bonus tracks on the original CD release.

== Charts ==
Chart (1989)	Peak position
Australian Albums (ARIA)	48
