= Attitude (Collette album) =

Studio album by Collette
- Released: 15 April 1991
- Genre: Pop, electronic, synthpop
- Label: CBS Records
- Producer: Mark S Berry

Collette chronology
Raze the Roof (1989)	Attitude (1991)	The Very Best of Collette and Sharon O'Neill (1991)

Singles from Attitude
- 1. "Who Do You Think You Are" Released: 6 August 1990; 2. "Upside Down" Released: 19 November 1990; 3. "This Will Be (Everlasting Love)" Released: 25 March 1991

Attitude is the second and final studio album by New Zealand-born Australian pop singer Collette. Attitude was released in April 1991 and peaked at No. 107 in Australia.

== Track listing ==
CD/Cassette/Vinyl (467674.2/4/1)

1. "Attitude" – 3:21
2. "Upside Down" – 3:28
3. "This Will Be (Everlasting Love)" – 3:38
4. "Every Beat of My Heart" – 3:46
5. "Get With It" – 4:01
6. "Rhythm of Life" – 4:02
7. "Who Do You Think You Are" – 3:48
8. "Don't Lead Me On" – 3:51
9. "Give It Up" – 3:36
10. "Who Would Ever Believe" – 3:13
11. "No Turning Back" – 2:44

== Charts ==
Chart (1991)	Peak position
Australian Albums (ARIA)	107
