= Smash Palace =

- Theatrical release poster
- Directed by: Roger Donaldson
- Written by: Roger Donaldson; Bruno Lawrence
- Produced by: Roger Donaldson
- Starring: Bruno Lawrence; Anna Maria Monticelli; Keith Aberdein; Greer Robson; Desmond Kelly
- Cinematography: Graeme Cowley
- Edited by: Michael J. Horton
- Music by: Sharon O'Neill
- Production companies: Aardvark Films; New Zealand Film Commission
- Distributed by: Roadshow Films
- Release date: May 1981 (Cannes Film Festival)
- Running time: 108 minutes
- Country: New Zealand
- Language: English
- Box office: NZ$600,000 (New Zealand)

Smash Palace is a 1981 New Zealand drama/thriller directed by Roger Donaldson. The film chronicles Al, a retired race car driver (played by Bruno Lawrence) who runs "Smash Palace", a carwrecking yard in rural Manawatū-Whanganui, with his depressed French wife Jacqui (Anna Jemison) and their seven-year-old daughter Georgie (Greer Robson). After their turbulent marriage breaks down and Jacqui obtains a restraining order against him, Al kidnaps Georgie and descends into the forest.

Shot on location in the North Island Volcanic Plateau between February and May 1981, Smash Palace was the second feature film Donaldson directed. Lawrence contributed heavily to writing. The soundtrack was composed and performed by New Zealand-born singer Sharon O'Neill. Concerned that cultural cringe may result in an underwhelming box office performance, Donaldson decided to first release the film in Europe and the United States. Smash Palace premiered at Cannes in May 1981, barely four months after filming began. The film's subsequent American release was met with widespread critical acclaim for its performances, themes and cinematography. It was released theatrically in New Zealand in January 1982 and became a box office success.

Smash Palace is often cited by critics as one of the best films of 1981 and 1982. The film launched Donaldson's international career. The enthusiasm the film garnered in particular among American critics won him interest from Hollywood, and the chance to direct the first of a number of films financed outside of New Zealand, The Bounty. The film's eponymous wrecking yard is a real location that still exists today.

== Plot ==
Eight years before the film's events, retired international racing driver Al Shaw returned home to take over his late father's car-wrecking yard, "Smash Palace", on the remote North Island Volcanic Plateau. In the present day, Al's French-born wife Jacqui is increasingly unhappy with Al's obsession with cars and refusal to sell the yard, and fears for the future of their seven-year-old daughter Georgie. Al spends his days drinking with his policeman friend Ray Foley, whose vintage green Ford he is renovating, and mending cars with Tiny, an older man who is his long-term assistant. However, he is a loving and devoted father to Georgie.

Jacqui becomes closer with Ray after attending a party with him and seeks out his advice on her worsening relationship with Al. Coming back home with Georgie one afternoon, Al finds Jacqui and Ray having a drink together and violently beats and rapes her. Jacqui leaves Al, taking Georgie with her. Jacqui subsequently takes up a job as a French teacher and continues her relationship with Ray.

Al cannot adjust to the separation and continuously makes efforts to see his daughter, but Jacqui denies him contact. After Al takes Georgie rabbit-shooting without telling Jacqui first, she files to issue a protection order against him. Jacqui goes to Tiny for advice. He becomes concerned with both parties, feeling that Al should have treated her better but that the restraining order is unnecessary and provocative.

Al plans to make a racing comeback, and Jacqui forbids Al from taking Georgie to the race. In response, he destroys part of Jacqui's house with his tow truck and is arrested. With Al making no effort to contest it, Jacqui's protection order goes through the court process. Al sets up a hideout deep in the bush, then kidnaps Georgie from Jacqui at gunpoint. He pushes his tow truck off a cliff into a river to create a diversion for police. The Armed Offenders Squad launch a manhunt and locate the truck but have no success.

Al and Georgie get reacquainted in their bush hideout. Georgie reminds her father that tomorrow is her birthday; he makes amends by baking her a pie decorated with household candles. After just a night, Georgie suddenly falls ill. Al drives into town and robs a pharmacy at gunpoint, where he is spotted by a patrolling police car. He takes Rose the pharmacist hostage and flees with her and Georgie back to Smash Palace.

Ray and Jacqui arrive at the hostage scene inside a large tool shed. Jacqui defies orders and runs through the cordon to reunite with her husband and daughter. There, she claims she still loves Al and proposes they sell the yard and move to Australia. Al reciprocates and hands over Georgie and agrees to let Rose go in exchange for Ray. When Ray enters the tool shed, Al traps him with a noose made of chicken wire he has tied to the end of the gun. He lets Rose go and forces Ray out to the garage and into Ray's green vintage Ford. Surrounded by police, Al drives Ray slowly through the wrecking yard and onto the nearby railway tracks in front of an approaching train in an apparent murder-suicide attempt. However, the train switches to the other track at the last minute, completely missing them. Al claims he knew that would happen, as he never would have destroyed a car he loves so much, and begins to laugh hysterically.

== Cast ==
- Bruno Lawrence as Al Shaw
- Anna Jemison as Jacqui Shaw
- Greer Robson as Georgie Shaw
- Keith Aberdein as Ray Foley
- Desmond Kelly as Tiny
- Sean Duffy as Frank
- Lyn Robson as Linda
- Margaret Umbers as Rose
- Roy Sturch as Crash Car Driver
- Jazz as Buick

== Production ==
Roger Donaldson was inspired to write the film after reading a newspaper article of a 5-year-old boy being kidnapped by his police officer father in a custody dispute, which resulted in an armed standoff. The film was funded by the New Zealand Film Commission. When Donaldson first applied for funding, he was turned down. On a second attempt he was once again denied funding, until veteran film maker John O’Shea pointed out that Donaldson's earlier work Sleeping Dogs had been the reason the commission was founded.

Bruno Lawrence made significant contributions to the film's script, working on writing sessions after shoots. One of the conditions of the film's eventual funding by the NZFC was that it be completed in time to screen at the 1981 Cannes Film Festival. This forced a tight schedule on the production team, giving only four months between the commencement of the shoot and the film's premiere.

== Release and reception ==
=== Theatrical release ===
Although Smash Palace was completely New Zealand financed and shot, the film was first released in the USA. The producers' expectation was that by initially releasing in the US the film would gain positive reviews from international critics, thus encouraging local audiences, prone to a dismissal of New Zealand product as amateurish, to go and see the film. The strategy worked, with the film proving hugely successful in New Zealand.

The film was released theatrically in New Zealand on 22 January 1982 in Auckland, Wellington and Christchurch, and on 29 January 1982 in Hamilton, New Plymouth, Palmerston North and Dunedin. The film grossed NZD$600,000 at the local box office (equivalent to $2,800,000 in 2026). Donaldson later admitted he exaggerated to foreign distributors how much the film cost to make, inflating the budget to $1,000,000 out of fear it would not be taken seriously.

In New Zealand, Smash Palace has an R16 rating.

=== Reception ===
On Rotten Tomatoes, Smash Palace holds an approval rating of 100% based on 7 reviews, with an average rating of 8.60/10. The film won much acclaim for the performance of Bruno Lawrence, one of New Zealand's best-known actors. It was successful in its home land, and received positive reviews in the United States; Veteran critic Pauline Kael described it as "amazingly accomplished". Roger Ebert gave Smash Palace four out of four stars and dubbed it one of the best films of 1982, the year of its major theatrical release. He wrote that the film was "so emotionally wise and observant that we learn from it why people sometimes make the front pages with guns in their hands and try to explain that it's all because of love". The New York Times picked it as one of its ten best movies of 1981. A rare negative review came from Time Out, which dismissed the film as a "turkey" and "instantly forgettable". At the 1982 Manila Film Festival, Bruno Lawrence received an award for Best Actor for his portrayal of Al Shaw.

== Location ==
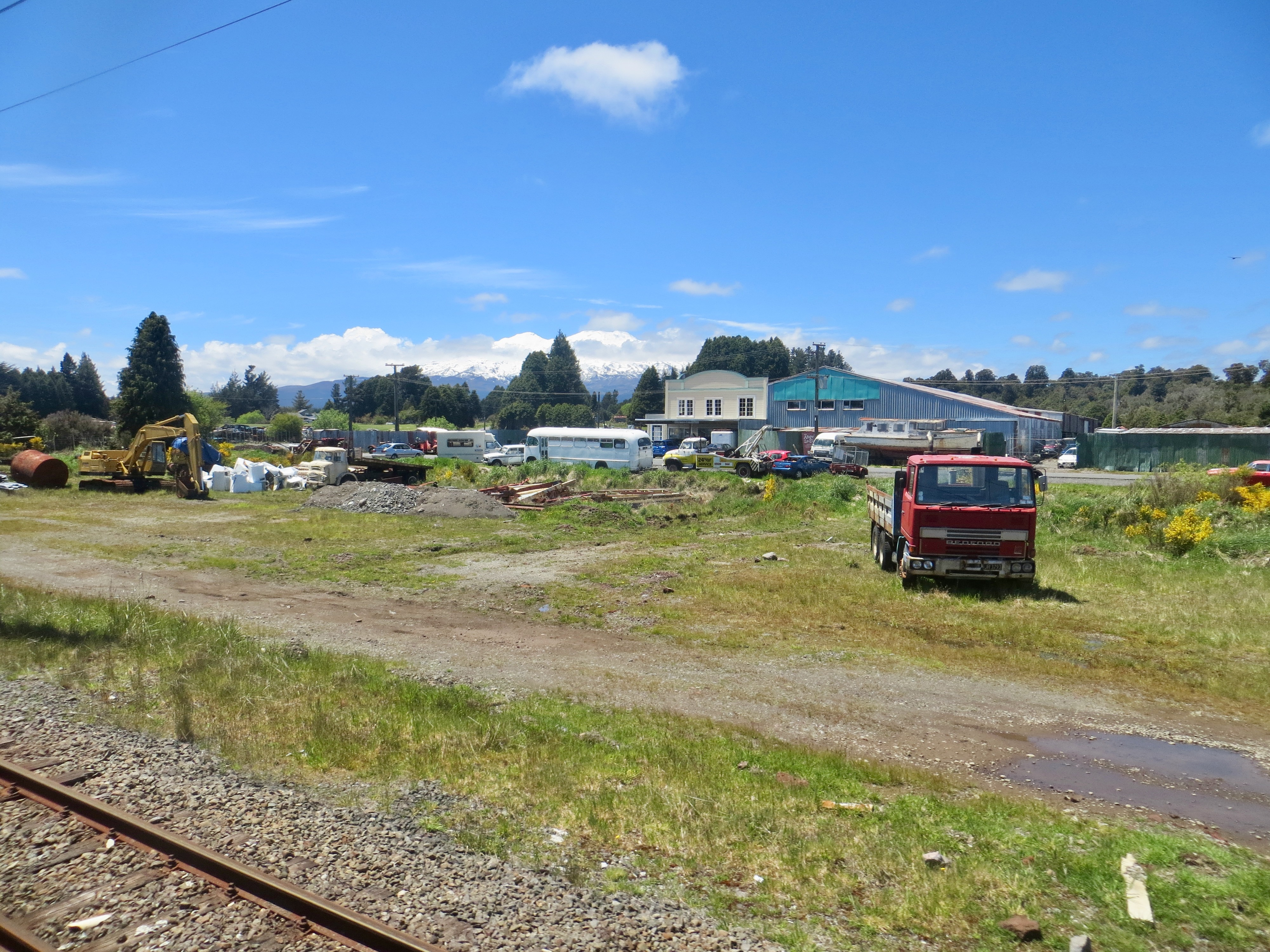
Horopito Motors, pictured in 2012

Much of the film was shot on location at car dismantling business Horopito Motors, which has existed on the same site since the 1940s, in the locality of Horopito near Ohakune (39.34474°S 175.37872°E). A scene from road movie Goodbye Pork Pie (1981) was also shot in the same location. In the 21st century, the finale of Hunt for the Wilderpeople (2016) was shot at the same site, referencing the two earlier films.

== Soundtrack ==
A soundtrack was released in 1982, featuring five songs by New Zealand singer songwriter Sharon O'Neill. It won Best Film Soundtrack/Cast Recording/Compilation at the 1983 New Zealand Music Awards.
