= I Feel It =

Single by DJ Darren Briais vs DJ Pee Wee Ferris
- Released: 1995
- Studio: Play House Studios, Sydney
- Length: 4:11
- Label: Dancepool
- Songwriters: Darren Briais; DJ Pee Wee Ferris
- Producers: Darren Briais; DJ Pee Wee Ferris

DJ Darren Briais vs DJ Pee Wee Ferris singles chronology
"I Feel It" (1995)	"Do It" (1996)

"I Feel It" is a song credited to DJ Darren Briais vs DJ Pee Wee Ferris The song was released in 1995 and peaked at number 20 on the Australian singles chart. The main vocal was performed by Zhana Saunders and was sampled from her song "Sanctuary of Love" that was released in 1991.

At the ARIA Music Awards of 1996, the song was nominated for the ARIA Award for Best Dance Release.

== Track listings ==
1. "I Feel It" (Radio version) - 4:11
2. "I Feel It" (Extended version) - 6:38
3. "I Feel It" (Acid Underground) - 6:16
4. "I Feel It" (Peewee's Tripping Out mix) - 7:31
5. "I Feel It" (BS Happy Hardcore mix) - 5:49

== Charts ==
=== Weekly charts ===
Chart (1996)	Peak position
Australia (ARIA)	20

=== Year-end charts ===
Chart (1996)	Position
Australia (ARIA)	66
