= That's What I Like About You (Collette song) =

Single by Collette

from the album Raze the Roof
- B-side: "Hothouse"
- Released: 16 October 1989
- Recorded: Studios 301, Sydney
- Genre: Pop
- Length: 3:27
- Label: CBS Records
- Songwriter(s): Collette Roberts
- Producer(s): Kirke Godfrey, Pee Wee Ferris

Collette singles chronology
"All I Wanna Do Is Dance" (1989)	"That's What I Like About You" (1989)	"Who Do You Think You Are" (1990)

"That's What I Like About You" is a song written and recorded by New Zealand born, Australian pop singer Collette. It was released in October 1989 as the third and final single from her debut studio album, Raze the Roof (1989). The song peaked at number 31 on the ARIA Charts.

== Track listing ==
7" (CBS 655337)

- Side A "That's What I Like About You" - 3:27
- Side B "Hothouse" - 4:18

12"

- Side A1 "That's What I Like About You" (Licensed to Dance Mix) - 6:11
- Side A2 "That's What I Like About You" (Burn It Down Mix) - 6:15
- Side B1 "Hothouse" (Warehouse Mix) - 6:38
- Side B2 "Hothouse" (Truffle Hunting Mix) 6:14

== Charts ==
Chart (1989)	Peak position
Australia (ARIA)	31
