= Ben Ransom (musician) =

Australian songwriter & entertainer

- Born: Sydney, Australia
- Genres: Country rock
- Occupations: Songwriter, singer
- Instruments: Vocals, guitar
- Years active: 1997–present
- Labels: Ben Ransom, Checked Label, Country Rocks
- Website: www.benransom.com

Ben Ransom is an Australian country music songwriter and entertainer. Since 2001, Ransom has opened for major international artists like Tim McGraw and supported major Australian artists including Diesel, Daryl Braithwaite, Mental as Anything, Ian Moss, Dragon, Richard Clapton, Eurogliders, James Reyne, Angry Anderson, Jon Stevens, Pseudo Echo, The Angels, The Church, Jon English. Ransom has released four albums.

== Early life and career ==
Ransom was born in Sydney and began playing guitar and writing song at the age of fifteen. In 1999, Ransom left Australia to spend time in Europe, and maintained a residency in the West End of London before returning to Australia.

In 2010, Ransom completed his first album, The Long Way. Though remaining unreleased, it produced a single, "Bourbon & Sunsets" which was released in 2011 and peaked at number 2 on the Hot Country Top 50 chart. At the 2011 Australian Independent Artists Development Awards, Ransom was nominated for three awards.

Two times finalist in the coveted Toyota Star Maker competition, Country Music Awards of Australia, Ben became a Graduate of the CMAA Academy of Country Music in July 2012.

By March 2013, Ransom released his official debut album, Slow Burn, which included the singles "Truck Stop Honey", "Big Country Sky" and "You're On the Top of My 'to-do’ List".

In October 2013, Ransom was introduced to Robie Porter which resulted in the collaboration on the Jackson Browne classic, "Somebody's Baby", released under Porters' Wizard Records label, the track was launched at the 2014 Country Music Festival.

In 2016, Ransom released Ben Ransom Live.

In 2017 Ransom became the first artist signed with the new label, Country Rocks Records. Ransom said "I'm absolutely stoked to be part of the Country Rocks family – knowing that I am associated with a team that actually walks the walk! These guys are out there putting in the hard slog, which is why their passion for music and ethos of 'respect' for the artists is so refreshing". The single "Let's Go Driving" became Ransom's first number one on the country chart, staying at the top spot for six consecutive weeks.

In January 2018 Ransom released his third studio album, 101. The album included the singles "You're the Reason Why", "Let's Go Driving" and "Same Song, Different Day".

In 2018, Ransom collaborated with Australasian icon Sharon O'Neill on the song "Young Years", a song she wrote with her partner Alan Mansfield and originally recorded by Dragon.

In January 2021, Ransom released Brave New World. The album peaked at No. 3 on the ARIA Chart as Ransom went on to state that he "tried hard to avoid the 'cookie cutter' clichés and sounds that have become a staple of the material that seems to proliferate the current scene."

== Discography ==
=== Studio albums ===
| Title | Details | Peak positions |
| Title | Details | AUS country |
|---|---|---|
| The Long Way | Release date: October 2010; Label: Ben Ransom; Formats: CD | – |
| Slow Burn | Release date: March 2013; Label: Ben Ransom, Checked Label; Formats: CD, DD | – |
| 101 | Release date: 12 January 2018; Label: Ben Ransom, Country Rocks (CR1003); Formats: CD, DD, streaming | – |
| Brave New World | Release date: 29 January 2021; Label: Ben Ransom, Country Rocks (CR1005); Formats: CD, DD, streaming | 3 |
| First Night Fever | Release date: 2 May 2025; Label: Ben Ransom (BAR004); Formats: CD, DD, streaming | 1 |

=== Live albums ===
| Title | Details |
|---|---|
| Ben Ransom Live | Release date: 13 March 2015; Label: Ben Ransom, Checked Label (BAR004); Formats: CD, DD, streaming |

== Awards ==
=== Tamworth Songwriters Awards ===
The Tamworth Songwriters Association (TSA) is an annual songwriting contest for original country songs, awarded in January at the Tamworth Country Music Festival. They commenced in 1986.

| Year | Nominee / work | Award | Result (wins only) |
|---|---|---|---|
| 2021 | "Mama Said" by Ben Ransom | Country Rock Song of the Year | Won |
| 2021 | "Night After Night" by Ben Ransom | Alt. Country Rock Song of the Year | Won |
| 2021 | "Night After Night" by Ben Ransom | Country Song of the Year | Won |
