= Who Do You Think You Are (Collette song) =

Single by Collette

from the album Attitude
- B-side: "Victim of the Groove" (Aja Remix)
- Released: 6 August 1990
- Recorded: 1990
- Studio: Studios 301, Sydney
- Genre: Pop, electronic, house, new jack swing
- Length: 3:48
- Label: CBS Records
- Songwriter(s): Collette Roberts, Peter Bowman
- Producer(s): Mark S. Berry

Collette singles chronology
"That's What I Like About You" (1989)	"Who Do You Think You Are" (1990)	"Upside Down" (1990)

"Who Do You Think You Are?" is a song written and recorded by New Zealand-born, Australian pop singer Collette. It was released in August 1990 as the lead single from her second studio album, Attitude (1991). The song peaked at number 56 on the Australian ARIA singles chart.

== Formats and track listings ==
7" (CBS 656128)

- Side A "Who Do You Think You Are" - 3:48
- Side B "Victim of the Groove" (Aja Remix) - 3:58

12"

- Side A1 "Who Do You Think You Are" (Club Mix) - 6:24
- Side A2 "Who Do You Think You Beat" - 2:42
- Side B1 "Who Do You Think You Are" (Dub) - 5:15
- Side B2 "Who Do You Think You Are" (Percappella) - 4:06

== Charts ==
Chart (1990)	Peak position
Australia (ARIA)	56
