= When the Cat's Away (album) =

Live album by When the Cat's Away
- Released: June 1987
- Recorded: May 1987
- Venue: His Majesty's Theatre, Auckland, New Zealand
- Label: CBS
- Producer: Doug Rogers, Rhys Moody

When the Cat's Away chronology
When the Cat's Away (1987)	Live in Paradise (2001)

When the Cat's Away is the first live album from New Zealand female vocal group When the Cat's Away.

== Background and release ==
When the Cat's Away was formed by four female singers at the 1985 New Zealand Music Awards. The group began performing in September 1986 and signed with CBS Records. In May 1987, the group began a 30-date tour across New Zealand. A performance at His Majesty's Theatre in Auckland was recorded and the album was released in June 1987.

== Track listing ==
Vinyl/cassette (CATLP 001) Side A
No.	Title	Writer(s)	Length
1.	"Le Freak"	Bernard Edwards, Nile Rodgers
2.	"1999"	Prince
3.	"It's Raining Men"	Paul Jabara, Paul Shaffer
4.	"I Walk Away"	Neil Finn
5.	"Got To Get You Into My Life"	Lennon-McCartney

Side B
No.	Title	Writer(s)	Length
1.	"Lady Marmalade"	Bob Crewe, Kenny Nolan
2.	"Haven't Done Nothing"	Stevie Wonder
3.	"Dragons and Demons"	Toni Fonoti
4.	"Shark Attack"	Tim Finn
5.	"I Love Rock 'n' Roll"	Alan Merrill, Jake Hooker

== Personnel ==
- Ross McDermott – bass
- Wayne Bell – drums
- Gary Verberne – guitar
- Steve Larkins – keyboard
- Jay Foulkes – percussion
- Chris Green – saxophone
- Mike Russell – trumpet

== Charts ==
Chart (1987–89)	Peak position
New Zealand Albums (RMNZ)	39

== Certifications ==
Country	Certification
New Zealand	Gold
