= Satin Sheets (Sharon O'Neill song) =

Single by Sharon O'Neill

from the album Edge of Winter
- B-side: "Little One"
- Released: 18 June 1990
- Length: 3:50
- Label: Polydor
- Songwriter(s): Sharon O'Neill; Alan Mansfield
- Producer(s): Alan Mansfield; Carey Taylor

Sharon O'Neill singles chronology
"Water for the Flowers" (1989)	"Satin Sheets" (1990)	"Poster Girl" (1991)

"Satin Sheets" is a song by New Zealand singer-songwriter Sharon O'Neill, which was released in 1990 as the lead single from her sixth studio album Edge of Winter. The song was written by O'Neill and Alan Mansfield, and produced by Mansfield and Carey Taylor. "Satin Sheets" reached No. 106 on Australia's ARIA Chart.

The song's music video was directed by Kriv Stenders and produced by Jason Schepsi for World's End Film Productions. In 2005, the song was included on the Sony compilation The Best of Sharon O'Neill.

== Background ==
Edge of Winter was released in 1990 as O'Neill's second and final album for Polydor. Preceding the album was the lead single "Satin Sheets", which generated only limited airplay on radio and failed to become a hit. The lack of commercial success for "Satin Sheets", its follow-up "Poster Girl" and Edge of Winter led O'Neill to concentrate on songwriting rather than her solo career. In 2001, O'Neill told Radio New Zealand, "I was so disappointed Edge of Winter got lost in the shuffle somewhere along the line. The first single "Satin Sheets" never really did do what we had hoped."

In a 1990 interview with The Sydney Morning Herald, O'Neill said of the song in context of the album, "There's still the ballads, but there are a couple of really strong rock tracks on Edge of Winter [including "Satin Sheets"] that are going to be fantastic live and sound really good on record. They basically kick arse, which is nice, 'cause I love that."

== Critical reception ==
In a review of the single, Penelope Layland of The Canberra Times wrote, "It is a while since we've heard from O'Neill, but time has done nothing to diminish the excellence of her voice. This is fairly standard pop/rock. Nice, but nothing special." In a review of Edge of Winter, John Lilley, writing for The Canberra Times, described the song as "equal of any of O'Neill's previous hits".

== Track listing ==
7" single

1. "Satin Sheets" – 3:50
2. "Little One" – 4:28

== Personnel ==
Satin Sheets

- Sharon O'Neill – vocals
- Maggie McKinney, Mark Williams – backing vocals
- Peter Northcote, Alan Darby, Tommy Emmanuel – guitars
- Kirk Lorange – slide guitar solo
- Alan Mansfield – keyboards, percussion
- Michael Hegerty – bass
- John Watson – drums

Production

- Alan Mansfield – producer of "Satin Sheets" and "Little One"
- Carey Taylor – producer, engineer and mixing on "Satin Sheets" and "Little One"
- Ian Cooper, Don Bartley – mastering

Other

- Grant Matthews – photography
- Arthur Gregory – cover design

== Charts ==
Chart (1990)	Peak position
Australian ARIA Singles Chart	106
