= Collette Roberts =

Australian singer (born 1968)

Collette
- Born: Collette Roberts; 1968 (age 57–58); Christchurch, South Island, New Zealand
- Origin: Sydney, New South Wales, Australia
- Genres: Disco; dance pop
- Occupations: Musician, model, actor, stylist, make-up artist
- Instrument: Vocals
- Years active: 1988–1995
- Label: CBS

Collette Roberts (born 1968), who performed mononymously as Collette, is a New Zealand-born, Australian-based model turned disco, pop singer during the late 1980s and early 1990s. She had a top five single on both the Australian and New Zealand singles charts in 1989 with her cover version of Anita Ward's "Ring My Bell". Collette's rendition was certified gold in Australia by ARIA. Sometimes considered a one-hit wonder, Collette had two other top 40 Australian hits in 1989 with "All I Wanna Do Is Dance" and "That's What I Like About You". She retired from her music career in 1995 to focus on her work as a stylist and make-up artist.

== Biography ==
Collette Roberts was born in Christchurch, New Zealand. She became a fashion model and relocated to Melbourne. In 1988 she started working with Guy Gross in Sydney to co-write material for her proposed solo career. They recorded demo tracks, which they took to Tony Briggs of CBS Records Australia; Briggs advised Roberts to attempt a cover version of one of four tracks, which included Anita Ward's 1979 hit, "Ring My Bell". After recording a demo of that track, she was signed to CBS.

Roberts worked with her producers, Peewee Ferris and Kirke Godfrey, on a new version of "Ring My Bell", which was recorded at CBS Studios in East Sydney. She co-wrote the B-side, "Save Yourself", with Ferris. The single was released in February 1989, and reached No. 5 on the ARIA Singles Chart and No. 4 in New Zealand. "Ring My Bell" was certified gold in Australia by Australian Recording Industry Association (ARIA). To promote the single, Roberts performed in bright fluorescent lycra clothing, especially bike shorts, bras and braces.

In September 1989 a Federal Court of Australia case, CBS Records Australia Limited v Guy Gross with Gross supported by Dr G.B. Hair, Mr Derek Williams and Mr Martin Armiger and CBS supported by Mr R.W. Toop, heard that Gross was counter-suing for a share in royalties and costs associated with Roberts' single; the court determined that "There was nothing unjust in what occurred, no reason why Guy should be remunerated by Collette for his work and no reason why Collette should not retain any benefit she may receive from CBS. The cross-claim will therefore be dismissed."

The artist issued two more singles in 1989, "All I Wanna Do Is Dance" (July) and "That's What I Like About You" (October), and both reached the ARIA Singles Chart top 40. All three singles appeared on her debut album, Raze the Roof (October 1989), which peaked in the top 50 on the ARIA Albums Chart. Roberts and Ferris co-wrote five of its ten tracks, with Roberts writing or co-writing three other tracks.

In 1990 the singer developed a new image of short hair and black clothing; she cast aside the bike shorts look in an attempt for her music to be taken more seriously. Her second album, Attitude, appeared in April 1991, which was produced by Mark S. Berry. The album and its singles, "Who Do You Think You Are?" (August 1990), "Upside Down" (November) and "This Will Be" (March 1991), yielded little commercial success. Roberts appeared briefly as Isabelle Britton on the Australian soap opera, Home and Away, in late 1991.

Roberts retired from the music industry in 1995 and pursued a career as a stylist and make-up artist. She appeared on Channel 7's Where Are They Now? in 2006, revealing that she does volunteer work at Sydney's Taronga Zoo. She occasionally performs "Ring My Bell" at LGBT interest events, wearing similar outfits to the one she wore in the original music video.

In November 2019, a thirtieth-anniversary edition of the Raze the Roof album was made available for purchase digitally and on streaming platforms.

== Discography ==
=== Studio albums ===
List of studio albums with Australian chart positions
Title	Album details	Peak chart positions
Title	Album details	AUS
Raze the Roof	Released: 30 October 1989; Label: CBS Records	48
Attitude	Released: 15 April 1991; Label: CBS Records	107

=== Compilation albums ===
Title	Album details
The Very Best of Collette and Sharon O'Neill	Released: 2 December 1991; Label: J&B Records

=== Singles ===
Year	Single	Peak positions			Certification	Album
Year	Single	AUS	NZ	UK	Certification	Album
1989	"Ring My Bell"	5	4	93	ARIA: Gold	Raze the Roof
1989	"All I Wanna Do Is Dance"	12	21	—		Raze the Roof
1989	"That's What I Like About You"	31	—	—		Raze the Roof
1990	"Who Do You Think You Are?"	56	—	—		Attitude
1990	"Upside Down"	91	—	—		Attitude
1991	"This Will Be (Everlasting Love)"	122	—	—		Attitude
1995	"You Can Run" (with The Nation)	149	—	—		non-album single
"—" denotes releases that did not chart or were not released.
