= John McCready =

New Zealand businessman

John McCready was the founder of the RTC record label in New Zealand. He was also the general manager of CBS Records, New Zealand.

== Background ==
Prior to mid-1974, McCready was working at Phonogram in New Zealand as the GM of their creative division. In the late 1970s, he formed his own record label, RTC. The label was the licensee for the catalogue of Virgin Records in New Zealand. This opened the door for him to work at CBS records.

He started with CBS Australia in March 1981. By January 1982, he was in charge of the Australian operation.

During the 1980s, McCready was GM of Radio Hauraki. Later he moved into television.
