= When the Cat's Away (band) =

New Zealand band formed in 1985

- Origin: Auckland, New Zealand
- Genres: Pop
- Years active: 1985–1991, 2001–2002, 2023-2024
- Labels: CBS, Peach
- Past members: Annie Crummer; Margaret Urlich; Debbie Harwood; Kim Willoughby; Dianne Swann

When the Cat's Away is a New Zealand female vocal group and covers band formed in 1985. They are best known for their cover of the Blue Mink assimilationist song "Melting Pot", which became a New Zealand number one hit for them in 1988. In 2021, the band members were inducted into the New Zealand Music Hall of Fame.

== Background ==
At the 1985 New Zealand Music Awards, Annie Crummer, Debbie Harwood, Kim Willoughby, Dianne Swann, and Margaret Urlich formed a female vocal group. In 2004 Dianne Swann reflected on their start: "The idea formed to get together, have some fun and sing a bunch of songs that we like, learn some harmonies. I don’t think anybody pictured it as being as popular as it became."

When The Cat's Away debuted at Auckland's Wildlife in September 1986. Soon after they were performing more frequently at bigger venues, before signing a two singles and live album deal with CBS Records.

In 1987, they released their debut single "Leader of the Pack", followed by "Sanctified", with neither charting. In May 1987, the group began a 30-date national tour, recording the album at His Majesty's Theatre. In June 1987, the group released the live self-titled debut album, consisting of cover versions of pop songs. The album peaked at number 39 and was certified gold in New Zealand. Debbie Harwood told RipItUp writer Chris Bourke "The Cats is a break from getting our own stuff played, recorded and on the radio. It's ‘the girls go out to play’ … we’re only there to have fun really – there are no serious messages, just singing our favourites."

In November 1988, the group released a cover of "Melting Pot" which peaked at number 1 and was certified gold in New Zealand. The group toured extensively throughout 1988/89, becoming one of the biggest live acts in New Zealand at that time. The group was awarded Listener Film and Television Awards for 'Entertainers of the Year' and 'Documentary of the Year' in 1988 and also took out the coveted 'Group of the Year' award at the 1989 New Zealand Music Awards.

"Free Ride" was released in January 1990 and peaked at number 12. Soon after, Swann left the group, and the other members followed pursuing solo careers and other projects.

In 2001, the band reformed (minus Dianne Swann) and released a cover version of Sharon O'Neill's 1980 single "Asian Paradise". Shortly after that, O'Neill returned their gesture by performing with them on the nationwide Paradise Tour including over three nights at the Aotea Centre in Auckland. A live album was recorded during that tour and released as "Live in Paradise". The album peaked at number 7 and went platinum.

In 2002, the group toured again, playing large outdoor shows and featured O'Neill along with Eddie Rayner and Noel Crombie from Split Enz and choreography from Rietta Austin.

In December 2021, the five members of the band were inducted into the New Zealand Music Hall of Fame at the Aotearoa Music Awards in recognition of their contributions to New Zealand music.

A 2023 concert in honour of deceased member Margaret Urlich was followed by a New Zealand tour in 2024.

== Discography ==
=== Albums ===
| Year | Title | Details | Peak chart positions | Certifications (sales threshold) |
| Year | Title | Details | NZ | Certifications (sales threshold) |
|---|---|---|---|---|
| 1987 | When the Cat's Away | Label: CBS; Catalogue: CAT LP001 | 39 | NZL: Gold |
| 2001 | Live in Paradise (with Sharon O'Neill) | Label: Peach Records; Catalogue: 537030 2 | 7 | NZL: Platinum |

=== Singles ===
| Year | Title | Peak chart positions | Certifications (sales threshold) | Album |
| Year | Title | NZ | Certifications (sales threshold) | Album |
|---|---|---|---|---|
| 1987 | "Leader of the Pack" | — | | Non-album single |
| 1987 | "Sanctified" | — | | Non-album single |
| 1988 | "Melting Pot" | 1 | NZL: Gold | Non-album single |
| 1990 | "Free Ride" | 12 | | Non-album single |
| 2001 | "Asian Paradise" | 16 | | Non-album single |

== Awards ==
| Year | Nominee / work | Award | Result |
|---|---|---|---|
| 1988 | When the Cat's Away | Listener Television Awards – Entertainment Programme | Won |
| 1989 | When the Cat's Away | New Zealand Music Awards – Best Group | Won |
| 1989 | Ross McDermott/Annie Crummer ("Melting Pot") | New Zealand Music Awards – Best Producer | Nominated |
| 2021 | When the Cat's Away | New Zealand Music Hall of Fame | inducted |
