= This Heart This Song =

Studio album by Sharon O'Neill
- Released: 12 February 1979
- Genre: Pop; pop rock
- Label: CBS New Zealand

Sharon O'Neill chronology
| This Heart This Song (1979) | Sharon O'Neill (1980) |

Singles from This Heart This Song
- 1. "Luck's on Your Table" Released: September 1978

This Heart This Song is the debut studio album by New Zealand singer and songwriter Sharon O'Neill. This Heart This Song debuted and peaked at No. 12 in New Zealand in February 1979.

== Background and release ==
Sharon O'Neill was signed to CBS shortly after finishing third in a singing contest performing the song, "Luck's on Your Table". John McCready, the head of CBS Records in New Zealand said: "I thought she was just fantastic and was surprised that her wonderful song and performance only got her only 3rd place. I was sure I had come across an artist who would be worth signing as our CBS New Zealand’s first local artist." McCready discovered Dick La Forte, a Radio New Zealand music producer had completed an album with Sharon, adding "I negotiated an agreement with all concerned parties to release the album on CBS." "Luck's on Your Table" was released in New Zealand in September 1978 and peaked at number 27.

In 2001, O'Neill reflected: "I know for a fact that John was only interested in signing me because I had original material. That to me was fantastic. It was a bit scary when somebody of John's status said 'I really believe these songs are going to work and we are going to market these and they are going to happen for you'."

In 2013 the This Heart, This Song album was released in its entirety on CD for the first time by Sony Music New Zealand. It was packaged in a 4-CD set, entitled Sharon O'Neill Original Album Classics, that featured all four full albums O'Neill released on the Sony label. The source material for the CD transfer of the This Heart, This Song album is a needle-drop recording.

== Track listing ==
Vinyl/cassette Side A
| No. | Title | Length |
|---|---|---|
| 1. | "Face in a Rainbow" | 5:15 |
| 2. | "Luck's on Your Table" (written by Sharon O'Neill) | 3:13 |
| 3. | "Another Man Fools You" | 3:06 |
| 4. | "Falling to the Ground" | 4:08 |
| 5. | "Don't Send Your Love Away" | 3:43 |

Side B
| No. | Title | Length |
|---|---|---|
| 1. | "This Heart This Song" | 3:18 |
| 2. | "In the Light of Day" | 2:43 |
| 3. | "Sun Song" | 3:48 |
| 4. | "Lately I'm Your Lady" | 3:56 |
| 5. | "You Take the Sailor from the Sea" | 3:42 |
| 6. | "Sweet Thing" | 6:07 |

== Charts ==
| Chart (1979) | Peak position |
|---|---|
| New Zealand Albums (RMNZ) | 12 |
