= Edge of Winter =

Studio album by Sharon O'Neill
- Released: 27 August 1990
- Recorded: 1990
- Genre: Pop
- Label: Polydor
- Producer: Alan Mansfield

Sharon O'Neill chronology
| Danced in the Fire (1987) | Edge of Winter (1990) | The Very Best of Collette and Sharon O'Neill (1991) |

Singles from Edge of Winter
- 1. "Satin Sheets" Released: 18 June 1990; 2. "Poster Girl" Released: 18 March 1991

Edge of Winter is the sixth studio album by New Zealand singer-songwriter Sharon O'Neill. The album was released by Polydor in August 1990. The album marks O'Neill's last solo studio album of new material. All the songs were written by O'Neill or co-written with guitarist/keyboardist Alan Mansfield of Dragon, who is also her domestic partner. O'Neil and Mansfield had written tracks for Dragon including "Young Years" for their 1989 album Bondi Road. Mansfield also produced the album.

The album's lead single, "Satin Sheets" reached No. 106 in Australia. The follow-up single, "Poster Girl", did not chart. There is also a new, more modern version of the 1983 single "Losing You" featured on the album.

== Background ==
Sharon O'Neill began her career in the 1970s in New Zealand, then gained major success in Australia. The early 1980s proved O'Neill's most commercially successful solo period, however a legal battle with her then record company CBS caused a delay in her career. O'Neill returned with 1987's Danced in the Fire on Polydor, and recorded her follow-up, Edge of Winter, for the same label.

Edge of Winter was not a commercial success, neither were its two singles "Satin Sheets" and "Poster Girl". Speaking to The Sydney Morning Herald in April 1991, O'Neill said: "I would like for it to be heard more. Whether that's my fault or the record company's I don't know. But there just hasn't been enough support from radio. The album was released at a terrible time and it probably got swallowed up."

In 2014, O'Neill was interviewed by Murray Cammick for Audio Culture. When speaking of her career with Polydor, she said: "It was great doing the two Polydor albums, I put a lot of hard work into them but the last album Edge Of Winter is as scarce as hen's teeth, I've only got one copy. They only made a certain amount."

== Track listing ==
All tracks are written by Sharon O'Neill and Alan Mansfield except where noted.

| No. | Title | Writer(s) | Length |
|---|---|---|---|
| 1. | "Prelude (To the Edge of Winter)" | | 1:11 |
| 2. | "Satin Sheets" | | 3:50 |
| 3. | "In Our Dreams" | | 4:38 |
| 4. | "Strangers Come" | O'Neill | 4:06 |
| 5. | "Sunday Driving" | | 3:35 |
| 6. | "Little One" | | 4:28 |
| 7. | "Edge of Winter" | O'Neill | 5:14 |
| 8. | "Losing You" | O'Neill | 3:55 |
| 9. | "I Know You Love Me" | | 4:12 |
| 10. | "Missing Person" | O'Neill | 5:02 |
| 11. | "Poster Girl" | O'Neill | 3:06 |

== Personnel ==
Credits adapted from the liner notes of Edge of Winter.

- Sharon O'Neill – lead vocals; backing vocals (5, 6), bass (10)
- Don Bartley – mastering
- Mel Collins – saxophone (4–6)
- Ian Cooper – mastering
- Alan Darby – guitar (2, 7, 9)
- Tommy Emmanuel – guitar (2, 3, 5, 6), acoustic guitar (10)
- Lindsay Field – backing vocals (4, 7)
- Venetta Fields – backing vocals (4, 7)
- The Gumba Bros – handclaps (9)
- John Harvey – additional engineering (10)
- Michael Hegerty – bass (2, 4, 7, 8)
- Shauna Jensen – backing vocals (4, 7)
- Kirk Lorange – slide guitar (2)
- Alan Mansfield – piano (1), keyboards (2–11), percussion (2, 5–7, 9, 10), production (all tracks)
- Maggie McKinney – backing vocals (2–4, 7, 8)
- Peter Northcote – guitar (2, 4, 7, 8)
- Mark Punch – guitar (4–9), backing vocals (10)
- Andy Sidari – bass (3, 5, 6), programming, sampling, additional keyboards
- Carey Taylor – engineering, mixing (all tracks), production (1–9)
- John Watson – drums (2, 3, 7, 8)
- Mark Williams – backing vocals (2–4, 7, 8, 10)

== Charts ==
| Chart (1990) | Peak position |
|---|---|
| Australian Albums (ARIA) | 142 |
