= Sharon O'Neill (album) =

Studio album by Sharon O'Neill
- Released: February 1980
- Recorded: 1979
- Studio: Marmalade Studios, Paradise Studios
- Genre: Pop, pop rock
- Label: CBS New Zealand
- Producer: Jay Lewis; Peter Dawkins; Steve Robinson

Sharon O'Neill chronology
This Heart This Song (1979)	Sharon O'Neill (1980)	Maybe (1981)

Singles from Sharon O'Neill
- 1. "Words" Released: September 1979; 2. "Baby Don't Fight" Released: December 1979; 3. "Asian Paradise" Released: April 1980; 4. "How Do You Talk to Boys" Released: August 1980

Words cover
- Australian edition

Sharon O'Neill is the second studio album by New Zealand singer and songwriter Sharon O'Neill. Sharon O'Neill peaked at No. 5 in New Zealand in March 1980. The album was released in Australia in August 1980 under the title Words, with the inclusion of "How Do You Talk to Boys".

== Background and reception ==
CBS Records' manager John McCready recruited US producer Jay Lewis to work on the album. McCready recalls, “Jay with his brilliant production managed to enhance Sharon’s wonderful songs.”

Gordon Campbell from the NZ Listener said “There are at least four tracks on Sharon O'Neill that are the equal of anything Linda Ronstadt is capable of. Two songs "Asian Paradise" and "Southern Blues" are marvelously evocative mood pieces.” adding “CBS deserve a lot of credit for having both the interest and the courage to put up the $30,000 that it took to make this album.”

== Track listing ==
Vinyl/cassette (237350) Side A
No.	Title	Writer(s)	Length
1.	"Ready to Love"	Sharon O'Neill	2:26
2.	"Awkward City"	O'Neill	3:12
3.	"Words"	O'Neill	3:16
4.	"Baby Don't Fight"	O'Neill	3:23
5.	"Love Can Be Cruel"	O'Neill	3:24
6.	"Bitter the Heart"	O'Neill	3:25

Side B
No.	Title	Writer(s)	Length
1.	"Asian Paradise"	O'Neill	5:03
2.	"I'll Be Home Again"	O'Neill	3:11
3.	"Some of this Heart"	O'Neill	2:24
4.	"Someone Just Like You"	O'Neill	3:04
5.	"Southern Blues"	O'Neill	4:00
6.	"How Do You Talk to Boys" (Australian edition only)	Steve Kipner, T Seufert	3:06

== Personnel ==
Credits adapted from vinyl record liner notes, which omit the musicians on "How Do You Talk To Boys."

- Sharon O'Neill – lead vocals (1, 3–11), arrangements (1–11), backing vocals (1, 3–11), piano (1, 4, 6, 7, 9, 11), Yamaha synthesizer (1, 2), clarinet (8)
- Clinton Brown – bass guitar (1–11)
- Ross Burge – drums (1, 2, 4–11)
- Peter Dawkins – production (12)
- Steve Garden – drums (3)
- Jim Hall – string arrangement (7)
- Jay Lewis – arrangements (all tracks), electric guitar (1, 2, 4–11), pedal steel (1, 6), tambourine (4, 11), backing vocals (5, 7, 8, 10, 11), steel drum (8), production (1, 2, 4–11)
- Dennis Mason – percussion (2, 5, 7), congas (4, 8, 10, 11), saxophone (5, 9, 11), backing vocals (8)
- Wayne Mason – electric piano (1, 5–7, 9, 10), Minimoog (1), piano (2, 3, 8), Yamaha synthesizer (5), acoustic guitar (10)
- Simon Morris – backing vocals (3)
- New Zealand Symphony Orchestra – strings (7)
- Steve Robinson – acoustic guitar (1, 3, 5–8), ARP Odyssey (1), backing vocals (3–7, 11), string machine (3), tambourine (3), electric guitar (9), production (3)
- Jerry Smith – engineering
- Jon Stevens – backing vocals (8)
- Brent Thomas – electric guitar (2, 3, 6, 11), backing vocals (8)

== Charts ==
Chart (1980)	Peak position
Australian Kent Music Report	66
New Zealand Albums (RMNZ)	3
