= Luck's on Your Table =

Single by Sharon O'Neill

from the album This Heart This Song
- Released: September 1978
- Genre: Pop
- Length: 3:09
- Label: CBS Records
- Songwriter(s): Sharon O'Neill
- Producer(s): Dick Le Fort

Sharon O'Neill singles chronology
"Love Song" (1972)	"Luck's on Your Table" (1978)	"Don't Say No to Tomorrow" (1979)

"Luck's on Your Table" is a song by New Zealand singer and songwriter Sharon O'Neill. The song was released in September 1978 as the lead single from her debut studio album, This Heart This Song (1979).

== Background and release ==
In the late 1960s, O'Neill was part of an acoustic band called Nelson. In 1972, O'Neill released her debut single, which didn't chart, before joining numerous bands between 1972 and 1977, including Chapta, Jessica and Shiner. In 1978, O'Neill competed on the national television program "The Entertainers" and sang the song from her Nelson days called "Luck's On Your Table". O'Neill finished third in the contest and signed with CBS Records shortly after, releasing "Luck's On Your Table" in September 1978.

John McCready, the head of CBS Records in New Zealand said "I thought she was just fantastic and was surprised that her wonderful song and performance only got her only 3rd place. I was sure I had come across an artist who would be worth signing as our CBS New Zealand’s first local artist." McCready discovered Dick La Forte, a Radio New Zealand music producer had completed an album with Sharon, adding "I negotiated an agreement with all concerned parties to release the album on CBS."

In 2001, O’Neill reflected, "I know for a fact that John was only interested in signing me because I had original material. That to me was fantastic. It was a bit scary when somebody of John’s status said ‘I really believe these songs are going to work and we are going to market these and they are going to happen for you’."

== Track listing ==
7" (BA 461867)

- Side A "Luck's on Your Table" - 3:09
- Side B "Sun Song" - 3:46

== Charts ==
Chart (1978)	Peak position
New Zealand (Recorded Music NZ)	27
