= Foreign Affairs (Sharon O'Neill album) =

Studio album by Sharon O'Neill
- Released: May 1983
- Recorded: 1982
- Genres: Pop, pop rock
- Label: CBS New Zealand
- Producer: John Boylan

Sharon O'Neill chronology
Smash Palace (1982)	Foreign Affairs (1983)	So Far (1984)

Singles from Foreign Affairs
- 1. "Losing You" Released: March 1983; 2. "Maxine" Released: May 1983; 3. "Danger" Released: October 1983

Foreign Affairs is the fourth studio album by New Zealand singer and songwriter Sharon O'Neill. It was O'Neill's final studio album release on CBS. The album was certified Gold in New Zealand.

== Background, writing, and recording ==
Late in 1981, O'Neill moved from New Zealand to Sydney, New South Wales, Australia to pursue her music career, where she wrote "Maxine", a song that chronicled the life of a prostitute. In a 2016 interview, O'Neill said; "I was living in a hotel in Kings Cross when I got the inspiration to write "Maxine". She was always out there working at 3am when we'd get home bleary-eyed from a gig".

The album was produced by John Boylan with local studio musicians. O'Neill, asked afterward whether this was one of the more enjoyable recording sessions, she said no, "but it was a highlight for me because it was done on the West Coast of the USA with a very important person in my life at the time, John Boylan..., who was so enthusiastic over my songs and pulled it all together and pulled in so many friends. I was such a fan of these people who came and played on the album that I was shaking in my shoes when they came into the studio". People who played on the album, she said, include Tom Scott, saxophonist with the ensemble L.A. Express, on "Maxine"; and David Lindley, the guitarist.

== Singles ==
Three singles from the album charted: "Losing You" (#26 in Australia, Kent Music Report); "Maxine" (#16 in Australia, Kent Music Report; #16 in New Zealand); and "Danger" (#78 in Australia, Kent Music Report).

== Track listing ==
All tracks are written by Sharon O'Neill.

Vinyl/cassette (237889) Side A
No.	Title	Length
1.	"Danger"	4:06
2.	"Maxine"	4:35
3.	"One of a Crowd"	4:11
4.	"Radio Lover"	3:47
5.	"Kids in Our Town"	4:00

Side B
No.	Title	Length
1.	"Losing You"
2.	"I've Got You to Thank"
3.	"Take the Fall"
4.	"Hearts on the Run"
5.	"All the Way Down"

== Personnel ==
Credits adapted from cassette liner notes, which omit the musicians on "All the Way Down."

- Sharon O'Neill – lead vocals, backing vocals (1, 5–7, 9), Rhodes piano (1, 3, 8), OB-Xa (1–4, 6–9), Wurlitzer piano (2), acoustic piano (4, 5), Prophet-5 (9)
- John Boylan – production
- Mike Baird – drums (2, 4, 7, 8)
- Michael Boddicker – Jupiter-8 (3, 6, 9), vocoder (6), Minimoog (9)
- Karla Bonoff – backing vocals (1, 3, 4)
- Mike Botts – drums (1, 3, 5, 6, 9)
- Scott Chambers – bass guitar (1, 3, 5, 6, 9)
- Bob Glaub – bass guitar (2, 4, 7, 8)
- Don Henley – backing vocals (9)
- Tommy Funderburk – backing vocals (1, 4, 6)
- Andrew Gold – guitar (7, 8)
- Carmen Grillo – backing vocals (2)
- Paul Grupp – tambourine (1, 3–5)
- Bobbye Hall – congas (1, 2, 5)
- Tom Kelly – backing vocals (6)
- David Lindley (Note: Arnold McCuller and David Lasley are the credited backing vocalists on "Maxine." However, O'Neill stated in a 2001 interview that the backing vocalists on the track were McCuller and Lindley.) – backing vocals (2)
- Marcella Levy – backing vocals (1, 3–5, 7–9)
- Arnold McCuller – backing vocals (2)
- Bill Payne – Hammond organ (7)
- Timothy B. Schmit – backing vocals (3, 5, 7–9)
- Tom Scott – saxophone (2, 3, 6)
- Brent Thomas – electric guitar (1–9), percussion (6)

== Charts ==
=== Weekly charts ===
Chart (1983–84)	Peak position
Australian Albums (Kent Music Report)	17
New Zealand Albums (RMNZ)	12

=== Year-end charts ===
Chart (1983)	Position
New Zealand Albums (RMNZ)	27
