= Peewee Ferris =

Australian DJ and producer

- Born: Peter Ferris; Australia
- Occupations: Singer; songwriter; DJ
- Years active: 1980s–present

Peewee Ferris is a DJ from Sydney. Ferris began mixing at an early age, being inspired by his older brothers Stephen and John who are also DJs. Peewee's pseudonyms include Pipi Le Oui, Slot Jockies and Sweatbox HQ.

He has composed music for some of the biggest multi media events in the world, such as the opening and closing ceremonies at the 2000 Summer Olympics. Dubai World Expo 2020 Shanghai World Expo 2010 opening ceremony, Vivid Drone Show 2023–2024 and Vivid Darling Harbour Water Shows 2015–2024 and in 2002 for the Gay Games. and multiple times at Sydney New Year's Eve fireworks spectacular. He has ranked highly in various dance magazine polls Rolling Stones Mag AU/NZ 2025 Greatest Electronic Artist in Australia Top 40, gaining worldwide exposure and thus gaining work through Asia, Europe and Africa.

== Career ==
=== 1980s–present ===
Ferris first came to prominence in the late 1980s after producing label-requested remixes for Australian singles including Jenny Morris' "Lighthearted", "Love Dimension" by Kate Ceberano and "Show No Mercy" by Mark Williams.

In 1989, Ferris co-wrote the majority of tracks and produced Collette's Raze the Roof album.

In 1992, Ferris worked with Mark James and David Berman on the dance group Bass Culture, who recorded an album with Geena, Kate Ceberano and Lisa Edwards, titled BC Nation.

In 1994, Ferris worked on the Culture Shock self-titled album.

In 1995, Ferris released music under his own name. Single "I Feel It" peaked at number 20 on the ARIA chart and at the 1996 ARIA Music Awards, was nominated for Best Dance Release. Ferris' debut album Social Narcotic was released in 1997.

In the late 1990s, Ferris remixed several Australian singles including Savage Garden's "I Want You", Human Nature's "Don't Say Goodbye" and "Whisper Your Name" and Tina Arena's "Now I Can Dance".

In 2000, he composed music for the opening and closing ceremonies of the Sydney 2000 Olympic Games and the Doha 2006 Asian Games and Shanghai World Expo 2010.

In 2022, he released a single "1972" with Toni Pearen under the name Pipi Le Oui. This was followed in 2023 with "Whatever Will Be". In October 2024, a remix album titled Two Tribes 2021–2025 was released with Mark James.

== Discography ==
=== Albums ===
List of albums, with selected details
| Title | Details |
|---|---|
| Social Narcotic | Released: 1997; Label: S3; Format: CD |

=== Charting singles ===
| Title | Year | Peak chart positions |
| Title | Year | AUS |
|---|---|---|
| "I Feel It" (as DJ Darren Briais vs. DJ Peewee Ferris) | 1995 | 20 |
| "Time to Make the Floor Burn" (as DJ Peewee Ferris vs. John Ferris) | 1996 | 67 |

== Awards and nominations ==
=== ARIA Awards ===
The ARIA Music Awards is an annual awards ceremony that recognises excellence, innovation, and achievement across all genres of Australian music.

| Year | Nominee / work | Award | Result |
|---|---|---|---|
| 1996 | "I Feel It" | Best Dance Release | Nominated |
| 1998 | Social Narcotic | Best Dance Release | Nominated |
