= Don't Say No to Tomorrow =

Single by Sharon O'Neill
- Released: June 1979
- Recorded: 1979
- Genre: Pop
- Length: 3:27
- Label: CBS Records
- Songwriter: Sharon O'Neill
- Producer: Dale Wrightson

Sharon O'Neill singles chronology
"Luck's on Your Table" (1978)	"Don't Say No to Tomorrow" (1979)	"Words" (1979)

"Don't Say No to Tomorrow" is a song by New Zealand singer and songwriter Sharon O'Neill. The song was released in June 1979 and became O'Neill's first top 10, peaking at number 6 in New Zealand. It remains her career highest-charting single.

== Background and release ==
O'Neill signed with CBS Records in 1978 and had released her debut studio album, This Heart This Song in February 1979. John McCready, the head of CBS Records in New Zealand, was aware of the upcoming TVNZ telethon and convinced the producers to have O'Nell do the official song. McCready said; "On approaching them I was informed of the show’s aims. It was International Year of the Child and the theme of Telethon would be “Don’t Say No To Tomorrow”. The producers agreed if Sharon could write a song with this theme and they liked it they would have it as the official song." adding "Sharon and I sat down and went through some of her newer compositions and we found one melody that Sharon thought could have the lyrics changed to embrace the Telethon theme."

== Track listing ==
7" (BA 461965)

- Side A "Don't Say No to Tomorrow"
- Side B "Falling to the Ground"

== Charts ==
Chart (1979)	Peak position
New Zealand (Recorded Music NZ)	6
