= Maybe (Sharon O'Neill album) =

Studio album by Sharon O'Neill
- Released: October 1981
- Recorded: 1981
- Genre: Pop; pop rock
- Label: CBS New Zealand
- Producer: Erik Scott; Peter McIan

Sharon O'Neill chronology
Sharon O'Neill (1980)	Maybe (1981)	Smash Palace (1982)

Singles from Maybe
- 1. "Waiting for You" Released: June 1981; 2. "Maybe" Released: September 1981; 3. "For All the Tea in China" Released: March 1982

Maybe is the third studio album by New Zealand singer and songwriter Sharon O'Neill. Maybe peaked at No. 7 in New Zealand in November 1981.

== Track listing ==
Vinyl/cassette (237604) Side A
No.	Title	Writer(s)	Length
1.	"Waiting for You"	Sharon O'Neill	2:26
2.	"She's Gonna Hurt You"	O'Neill	3:17
3.	"Maybe"	O'Neill	3:26
4.	"Betcha"	O'Neill	3:00
5.	"Long Distance From Singapore"	O'Neill	4:33

Side B
No.	Title	Writer(s)	Length
1.	"Street Boys"	O'Neill	3:31
2.	"Anytime You Want"	O'Neill	3:20
3.	"Hold Me Again"	O'Neill	3:41
4.	"For All the Tea in China"	O'Neill	3:19
5.	"I Don't Wanna Touch You (I Just Wanna Ride In Your Car)"	O'Neill	2:56

== Charts ==
Chart (1981)	Peak position
Australian Kent Music Report	44
New Zealand Albums (RMNZ)	7
