= Maybe (Sharon O'Neill song) =

Single by Sharon O'Neill

from the album Maybe
- Released: September 1981
- Recorded: Sydney, Australia
- Genre: Pop
- Length: 3:27
- Label: CBS Records
- Songwriter(s): Sharon O'Neill, Peter McIan
- Producer(s): Peter McIan

Sharon O'Neill singles chronology
"Waiting for You" (1981)	"Maybe" (1981)	"For All the Tea in China" (1982)

"Maybe" is a song by New Zealand singer and songwriter Sharon O'Neill. The song was released in September 1981 as the second single from her third studio album, Maybe (1981). The song became O'Neill's second top twenty single in New Zealand following "Don't Say No to Tomorrow" in 1979.

== Track listing ==
7" (BA 222863)

- Side A "Maybe" – 3:27
- Side B "Long Distance From Singapore" – 4:33

== Personnel ==
Credits adapted from the liner notes of Maybe.

- Sharon O'Neill – lead and backing vocals, keyboards
- Tommy Emmanuel – acoustic guitar
- Richard Harvey – mastering
- Steve Hopes – drums
- Peter McIan – production
- Erik Scott – bass guitar

== Charts ==
Chart (1981)	Peak position
Australian Kent Music Report	38
New Zealand (Recorded Music NZ)	12
