= Danced in the Fire (album) =

Studio album by Sharon O'Neill
- Released: October 1987
- Recorded: 1987
- Studios: 301 (Sydney); Maison Rouge (London); The Townhouse (London); Trafalgar (Sydney)
- Genres: Pop, pop rock, rock
- Length: 44:47
- Label: Polydor Records
- Producers: Alan Mansfield, Peter Walsh, John Brand

Sharon O'Neill chronology
So Far (1984)	Danced in the Fire (1987)	Edge of Winter (1990)

Singles from Danced in the Fire
- 1. "Physical Favours" Released: September 1987; 2. "Danced in the Fire" Released: December 1987; 3. "Shock to the Heart"/"We're Only Human" Released: August 1988

Danced in the Fire is the fifth studio album by New Zealand singer songwriter Sharon O'Neill and first on the Polydor Records label.

== Background and release ==
Sharon O'Neill signed her first contract with CBS in 1978. She released four top twenty albums in New Zealand between 1979 and 1983. A number of disputes followed, leading to an almost 5-year hiatus where O'Neill was not able to release music. O'Neill continued to write music however and in 1987 once the CBS contract had expired, O'Neill promptly signed a two-album deal with Polydor Records. "Physical Favours" was released as the first single in September 1987 and reached the top 40 in Australia and New Zealand. Danced on the Fire was released in October 1987.

During the legal battle, O'Neill began writing with others for the first time and some of this material was recorded for Danced in the Fire. She told The Sydney Morning Herald in 1987: "It was something to do when I couldn't record. It felt really weird at first, but I met a lot of good writers."

In a 2016 interview discussing album covers, O'Neill said "I always wore what I felt comfortable in... All I cared about was that I got to keep the leather jacket. The only time I had a stylist was for Danced in the Fire. I had boofy hair and a fan and to be perfectly honest it looked nothing like me but it was done already."

== Track listing ==
Vinyl/cassette (Polydor 833 557) Side A
No.	Title	Writer(s)	Length
1.	"Physical Favours"	Sharon O'Neill, Alan Mansfield	4:39
2.	"We're Only Human"	S. O'Neill, Richard Feldman, Steve Kipner	3:31
3.	"Trojan Horse"	S. O'Neill, Frank Musker	4:23
4.	"Far Away"	S. O'Neill	4:29
5.	"Take Me to Paris"	S. O'Neill	4:01

Side B
No.	Title	Writer(s)	Length
1.	"Danced in the Fire"	S. O'Neill	4:03
2.	"Shock to the Heart"	S. O'Neill	3:47
3.	"Thirst for Love"	S. O'Neill, A. Mansfield	3:50
4.	"Under Suspicion"	S. O'Neill, A. Mansfield	4:36
5.	"In Control"	S. O'Neill	3:28
6.	"Silk or Stone" (bonus track)	S. O'Neill	4:17

== Personnel ==
Credits adapted from the liner notes of Danced in the Fire.

Musicians

- Sharon O'Neill – lead vocals; piano (6)
- Peter Beckett – backing vocals (2, 7, 10, 11)
- Andy Brown – bass (2, 7, 10, 11)
- Tony Buchanan – soprano saxophone (6), tenor saxophone (8, 9)
- Steven Bywaters – double bass (6)
- Bernie Clarke – keyboards (3, 5)
- Joe Creighton – guitar (8)
- Les Davidson – guitar (2, 7, 10, 11)
- Tommy Emmanuel – guitar (1, 6, 8)
- Jon Farriss – drums (1)
- Michael Hegerty – bass (1, 9)
- Steve Hogarth – backing vocals (3–5)
- "Segs" Jennings – bass (3, 5)
- Phoenix Jones – backing vocals (3–5)
- Dave Kaff – drums (3)
- Alan Mansfield – arrangements (1, 6, 9), Yamaha DX7 (1, 6), E-mu Emulator (1, 6, 8), guitar (1), Hammond organ (1, 8, 9), Kurzweil K250 (1, 6), cello (6), percussion (6, 8, 9), drum programming (8), piano (9)
- Maggie McKinney – backing vocals (1, 6, 8, 9)
- Dave Monday – guitar (3–5), keyboards (3–5), bass (4)
- Gordon Neville – backing vocals (2, 7, 10, 11)
- Phil Palmer – guitar (2, 7, 10, 11)
- Mark Punch – guitar (9)
- Neil Richmond – programming (2, 7, 10, 11)
- Dave Ruff – drum programming (4), drums (5)
- Chuck Sabo – percussion (4)
- Mark Williams – backing vocals (1, 6, 8, 9)
- Alex White – keyboards (2, 7, 10, 11)

Technical

- John Brand – production (3–5)
- Steve Bywaters – engineering (1, 6, 8, 9)
- Ian Cooper – mastering
- Todd Hunter – computer operation (6, 9)
- Clive Martin – engineering (3–5)
- Alan Mansfield – production (1, 6, 8, 9)
- Carey Taylor – engineering, mixing (1, 6, 8, 9)
- Peter Walker – engineering (8)
- Peter Walsh – production, engineering (2, 7, 10, 11)
- Alan Wright – engineering (8)

== Charts ==
Chart (1987)	Peak position
Australian Kent Music Report	45
