= Physical Favours =

Single by Sharon O'Neill

from the album Danced in the Fire
- Released: 7 September 1987
- Recorded: Studios 301, Sydney, Australia
- Genre: Pop, Pop rock
- Label: Polydor Records
- Songwriters: Sharon O'Neill, Alan Mansfield
- Producer: Alan Mansfield

Sharon O'Neill singles chronology
| "Power" (1984) | "Physical Favours" (1987) | "Danced in the Fire" (1987) |

"Physical Favours" is a song by New Zealand singer and songwriter Sharon O'Neill. The song was released in September 1987 as the first single from her fifth studio album, Danced in the Fire (1987). It was O'Neill's first release on the Polydor Records label.

== Background and release ==
O'Neill signed with CBS records in 1978 and between 1979 and 1983, released four top twenty albums in New Zealand. A number of disputes followed, leading to an almost 5-year break between releasing music. O'Neill continued to write music however and in 1987 once the CBS contract had expired, O'Neill promptly signed a two-album deal with Polydor Records. "Physical Favours" was the first release.

== Track listing ==
7" (Polydor – 887 032-7)

- Side A "Physical Favours"
- Side B "Silk or Stone"

== Charts ==
| Chart (1987/88) | Peak position |
|---|---|
| Australian Kent Music Report | 39 |
| New Zealand (Recorded Music NZ) | 25 |

== Personnel ==
- Alan Manfield - DX7, Hammond organ, Guitar
- Michael Hegarty - Bass
- Tommy Emmanuel - Guitar
- Jon Farriss - Drums
- Maggie McKinney, Mark Williams - Backing vocals
