= Sing Children Sing =

Studio album by Lesley Duncan
- Released: June 1971
- Studio: IBC Studios, London
- Genre: Singer/Songwriter
- Length: 43:44
- Label: CBS
- Producer: Jimmy Horowitz

Lesley Duncan chronology
Black Flower (1969)	Sing Children Sing (1971)	Earth Mother (1972)

Professional ratings
Review scores
Source	Rating
Allmusic	3/5 stars

Sing Children Sing is an album by English singer-songwriter Lesley Duncan, released in 1971. It was produced by Jimmy Horowitz who was married to Duncan at the time. The musicians included then rising star Elton John on piano, guitar legend Chris Spedding and Pentangle drummer Terry Cox, all of whom were on a break from recording John's Madman Across the Water album, as well as noted percussionist Ray Cooper. Duncan first rose to prominence when John recorded her composition "Love Song" for his Tumbleweed Connection album in 1970.

"Love Song" has been covered by numerous artists, including Elton John (on his album Tumbleweed Connection), Olivia Newton-John, Barry White and Neil Diamond.

== Track listing ==
All songs by Lesley Duncan unless otherwise noted.

1. "Chain of Love" (Duncan, Jimmy Horowitz) - 4:43
2. "Lullaby" - 3:52
3. "Help Me Jesus" - 3:13
4. "Mr. Rubin" - 7:04
5. "Rainbow Games" - 2:42
6. "Love Song" - 3:38
7. "Sunshine (Send Them Away)" - 3:30
8. "Crying in the Sun" (Duncan, Horowitz) - 3:10
9. "Emma" (Duncan, Horowitz) - 2:37
10. "If You Won't Be Mine" - 2:56
11. "Sing Children Sing" - 3:39

== Personnel ==
- Lesley Duncan – vocals, guitar, mandolin
- Jimmy Horowitz – organ, piano, celeste, keyboards
- Tony Campo – bass
- Terry Cox – drums
- Elton John – piano
- Tristan Fry – percussion
- Joe Moretti – guitar
- Chris Spedding – guitar, bouzouki
- Ray Cooper – percussion

== Production notes ==
- Produced by Jimmy Horowitz
- Engineered by Andy Knight and Mike Claydon
- Art direction by John Hays
- David Katz – string arrangements

Edsel Records UK released the album on CD for the first time on Dec. 12, 2000.
