= How Do You Talk to Boys =

Single by Sharon O'Neill

from the album Words
- Released: 18 August 1980
- Genre: Pop
- Length: 3:07
- Label: CBS Records
- Songwriter(s): Steve Kipner, T Seufert
- Producer(s): Peter Dawkins

Sharon O'Neill singles chronology
"Asian Paradise" (1980)	"How Do You Talk to Boys" (1980)	"Waiting for You" (1981)

"How Do You Talk to Boys" is a song by New Zealand singer and songwriter Sharon O'Neill. The song was released in August 1980 as the final single from the international edition of her second studio album Sharon O'Neill titled Words (1980).

In a September 2001 interview with Murray Cammick, O'Neill said it was record producer John McCready that suggested she record the song, although she wasn't keen as it wasn't self-penned. O'Neill said "He sent me the cassette of the demo and said this will be your first Aussie No.1. and I went, ‘Am I going to be too precious about my own songs and really stupid here or am I going to give it a go?’ It worked but wasn't a hit. Maybe it made the Top 30. But it also empowered me a little with my own material and I stuck to that and got a lot more confidence.”

== Track listing ==
7" (BA 222714)

- Side A "How Do You Talk to Boys" – 3:07
- Side B "Bitter The Heart" – 3:26

== Charts ==
Chart (1980)	Peak position
Australian Kent Music Report	25
New Zealand (Recorded Music NZ)	26
