= Smash Palace (EP) =

EP by Sharon O'Neill
- Released: 1982
- Recorded: Marmalade Studios, Wellington, New Zealand; Studios 301, Sydney, Australia
- Genre: Pop, pop rock
- Length: 20:58
- Label: CBS Records
- Producer: Steve Robinson

Sharon O'Neill chronology
Maybe (1981)	Smash Palace (1982)	Foreign Affairs (1983)

Smash Palace is the first extended play by New Zealand singer and songwriter Sharon O'Neill. The EP is a soundtrack to the 1982 Roger Donaldson film, Smash Palace.

This vinyl only EP has become a very sought after item by collectors of her music. The recording won Best Film Soundtrack/Cast Recording/Compilation at the 1983 New Zealand Music Awards.

== Track listing ==
Side A
No.	Title	Writer(s)	Length
1.	"Smash Palace"	Sharon O'Neill	4:40
2.	"Jacqui's Theme/Hold On Love"	Sharon O'Neill	5:32

Side B
No.	Title	Writer(s)	Length
1.	"Don't Say I'm Crazy"	Sharon O'Neill	2:33
2.	"White Lines"	Sharon O'Neill	3:55
3.	"If It Was Love"	Sharon O'Neill	4:18
