= Danced in the Fire =

Single by Sharon O'Neill

from the album Danced in the Fire
- Released: 8 February 1988
- Recorded: Studios 301, Sydney, Australia
- Genre: Pop, Pop rock
- Length: 3:29
- Label: Polydor Records
- Songwriter: Sharon O'Neill
- Producer: Alan Mansfield

Sharon O'Neill singles chronology
"Physical Favours" (1987)	"Danced in the Fire" (1988)	"Shock to the Heart" / "We're Only Human" (1988)

"Danced in the Fire" is a song by New Zealand singer songwriter Sharon O'Neill. The song was released in February 1988 as the second single from her fifth studio album, Danced in the Fire (1987).

== Background ==
O'Neill signed with CBS records in 1978 and between 1979 and 1983, released four top twenty albums in New Zealand. A number of disputes followed, leading to an almost 5-year break where O'Neill was not able to release music. O'Neill continued to write music however and in 1987 once the CBS contract had expired, O'Neill promptly signed a two-album deal with Polydor Records. "Danced in the Fire" was written during that 5-year hiatus.

In a 2014 interview with 'Stuff', O'Neill said "Danced in the Fire" is her personal favourite and still resonates deeply now. She says ""It is my personal favourite... a lot was going on in my personal life, it was something I had to just get out musically. You are baring your soul to a degree. It's a nice disguise to put it in that form rather than just bawl your eyes out, that doesn't get you anywhere." adding "I was really happy when I finished that song, you know. I thought, phew, I can breathe now."

In a 2016 interview with Herald NZ, O'Neill said it is the song she is more proud of writing. She added "That was such a momentous time in my life – meeting Alan, breaking up with my husband, all the shit we went through with the record company – it's all in that song. It spilled out of me so fast, I had to get it out – it was cathartic."

== Track listing ==
7" (Polydor – 887 326-7)

- Side A "Danced in the Fire" – 3:29
- Side B "Thirst for Love" – 3:50

12"/CD Maxi (Polydor – 887 326-1)

- Side A1 "Danced in the Fire" (12" Mix) – 5:14
- Side A2 "Thirst for Love" – 3:50
- Side B1 "Danced in the Fire" (7" Version) – 3:29
- Side Bs "Danced in the Fire" (Acapella Mix) – 3:42

== Charts ==
Chart (1988)	Peak position
Australian Kent Music Report	98

== Credits ==
- Alan Manfield – DX7, Hammond, Guitar
- Michael Hegarty – Bass
- Tommy Emmanuel – Guitar
- Jon Farriss – Drums
- Maggie McKinney, Mark Williams – Backing vocals
