= Power (Sharon O'Neill song) =

Single by Sharon O'Neill
- Released: July 1984
- Recorded: Sydney, Australia
- Genre: Pop rock
- Label: CBS Records
- Songwriter(s): Sharon O'Neill
- Producer(s): Brent Thomas, Tommy Emmanuel

Sharon O'Neill singles chronology
"Danger" (1983)	"Power" (1984)	"Physical Favours" (1987)

"Power" is a song by New Zealand singer-songwriter Sharon O'Neill. The song was released in July 1984. It was the final single release of O'Neill's on the CBS label. The song peaked at number 36 in Australia.

At the 1985 Australian pop music awards, O'Neill won the award for Best Female Performance in a Video for her performance in the video for "Power".

== Track listing ==
7" (BA 223214)

- Side A "Power"
- Side B "Young Blades"

== Charts ==
Chart (1984)	Peak position
Australian Kent Music Report	36
