= Sharon O'Neill =

New Zealand singer-songwriter (born 1952)

- Born: Sharon Lea O'Neill; 23 November 1952 (age 73); Nelson, New Zealand
- Genres: Rock, pop, new wave
- Occupations: Singer, musician, songwriter
- Instruments: Vocals, guitar, piano
- Years active: 1970–present
- Labels: Sony, Polydor
- Partner: Alan Mansfield (died 2024)

Sharon Lea O'Neill (born 23 November 1952) is a New Zealand singer-songwriter and pianist, who had an Australasian hit single in 1983 with "Maxine" which reached No. 16 on both the Australian Kent Music Report and Recording Industry Association of New Zealand charts.

== Career ==
=== 1960s–1977: Career beginnings ===
Sharon O'Neill is a self taught musician who learned to play guitar by ear and started composing at an early age, by putting chords to her poetry. She began playing the acoustic guitar around Nelson in the 1960s.

O'Neill began recording with Robin Winch and Nancy Richman under the name Suitewater. An entry into the 1970 Mobil Song Quest, saw Sharon & Nancy make the finals with a song called "Life Upon Life" written by O'Neill. Another of her songs, "Nothing Makes It Easy", got her to the finals of the New Faces television talent show in 1972 In 1972, O'Neill released "Love Song" a Lesley Duncan cover on Ode Records. Between 1972 and 1977 O'Neill joined New Zealand band Chapta, a covers band called Jessica, and a rock-pop band called Shiner. In 1977, encouraged by Shiner guitarist and future husband Brent Thomas, O'Neill began concentrating on song writing. O'Neill was featured on the track "If There's Still a Little Love" on Mark Williams' 1977 album Taking It All in Stride, with the song also featuring on Mark Williams Greatest Hits compilation album released in late 1977. O'Neill also supported Williams on tour.

=== 1978–1983: CBS Records ===
In 1978, O'Neill performed the track "Luck's on Your Table" on the New Zealand TV show The Entertainers, where she finished third. She subsequently signed to CBS Records and released "Luck's on the Table" in September 1978. It reached number 27 on the New Zealand singles chart and was included on her debut album This Heart This Song, which was released in February 1979. In June 1979, O'Neill released "Don't Say No to Tomorrow", which was featured on a Telethon. It reached number 6 on the charts. That same year she received an APRA Silver Scroll Award for the song "Face in a Rainbow" from her debut album. O'Neill won best female artist at the New Zealand Music Awards in 1978, and 1979. In February 1980, O'Neill released her second studio album titled Sharon O'Neill, which peaked at number 3. At the 1980 New Zealand Music Awards, O'Neill won her third Female Artist of the Year as well as her first Album of the Year. The album gained moderate success in Australia with the hit "Words" (AUS #56) and the subsequent singles "Asian Paradise" (AUS #76) and "How Do You Talk to Boys" (AUS #25). O'Neill joined Jon Stevens on a duet called "Don't Let Love Go", which reached number 5 in New Zealand in March 1980.

O'Neill's third studio album Maybe was released in October 1981. It produced the hits "Waiting for You" and "Maybe" (AUS #38). O'Neill supported Boz Scaggs on his Australian tour before she moved to Australia to settle. O'Neill provided the soundtrack to Roger Donaldson's 1982 movie Smash Palace. It was a five-track extended play and won Best Film Soundtrack/Cast Recording/Compilation at the 1983 New Zealand Music Awards.

O'Neill's fourth studio album Foreign Affairs was released in May 1983. It contained the tracks "Losing You" (AUS #26) and "Maxine" (AUS #16), a song which chronicled the life of a Kings Cross prostitute. In a 2016 interview, O'Neill said: "I was living in a hotel in Kings Cross when I got the inspiration to write 'Maxine'. She was always out there working at 3am when we'd get home bleary-eyed from a gig." Foreign Affairs was certified gold in New Zealand.

=== 1984–1999: Polydor Records and compilations ===
A legal battle with her then-record company CBS caused a delay in her career. Sharon said publicly in an interview that CBS/Sony had asked for the next album recordings with no pre-warning due date and she was not ready. In 1984, CBS budget label J&B released a best of collection titled So Far. During the enforced hiatus, O'Neill wrote songs for ABC's 1984 TV series Sweet and Sour including the title song performed by Deborah Conway (later recorded by O'Neill as "In Control") and "Glam to Wham". She wrote "Blood Red Roses" for the soundtrack of Street Hero and music for Dancing Daze. O'Neill met American keyboardist and songwriter Alan Mansfield on Dragon's Body and the Beat Tour of New Zealand in 1984—they later became domestic and professional partners.

In October 1987, O'Neill returned with her fifth studio album Danced in the Fire on Polygram, which featured some biographical songs about her legal wrangles with CBS. "Physical Favours" peaked at number 25 in New Zealand and 39 in Australia. In 1988, CBS Records released a series of four-track EPs; Volume 18 was O'Neill and featured four of O'Neill's greatest hits.

In 1990, O'Neill released her sixth studio album Edge of Winter. Two singles were taken from this album, "Satin Sheets" and "Poster Girl", both of which failed to find chart success. The Very Best of Collette and Sharon O'Neill was released in 1991 by J&B Records. It contained eight tracks from Collette Roberts and eight tracks from O'Neill, including the previously non-album single "Power" from 1984.

In 1991, O'Neill collaborated with Robert Palmer and wrote "True Love" together for Palmer's Rhythm & Blues album. She also contributed vocals on that release. In 1994, O'Neill, Palmer, and Palmer's girlfriend Mary Ambrose co-wrote "Love Takes Time" for Palmer's Honey album. O'Neill contributed vocals to that release, as well as to Palmer's 1999 Rhythm & Blues and 2003's Drive.

=== 2000–present: Later career ===
In 2001, she toured as a guest artist with New Zealand female act When the Cat's Away. In 2005, she toured Australia as a support act for Leo Sayer and a comprehensive collection of her greatest hits was released by Sony Music Australia under the title The Best of Sharon O'Neill. In 2006 and early 2007, O'Neill again toured Australia supporting Leo Sayer.

From August–September 2007, O'Neill toured as part of the 'Countdown Spectacular 2' concert series Australia-wide and toured Australia and New Zealand on The Let It Be Tour (The Beatles tribute show) in November–December 2007.

In 2014, Sony New Zealand released a new greatest hits collection titled Words: The Very Best of Sharon O'Neill. The album peaked at number 6 on the New Zealand albums chart.

In 2018, O'Neill performed a duet with Ben Ransom titled "Young Years", the song she co-wrote for the group Dragon.

O'Neill's partner of 40 years, Alan Mansfield, died in Sydney of complications related to his cancer treatment, on 16 October 2024.

== Discography ==
=== Studio albums ===
- This Heart This Song (1979)
- Sharon O'Neill / Words (1980)
- Maybe (1981)
- Foreign Affairs (1983)
- Danced in the Fire (1987)
- Edge of Winter (1990)

== Awards and nominations ==
Year	Nominee / work	Award	Result
1978	Sharon O'Neill	New Zealand Music Awards - Top Female Vocalist	Won
1979	Sharon O'Neill	New Zealand Music Awards - Top Female Vocalist	Won
1979	"Face In a Rainbow"	APRA Awards (New Zealand) - Silver Scroll Awards	Won
1980	Sharon O'Neill	New Zealand Music Awards - Top Female Vocalist	Won
1980	Sharon O'Neill	New Zealand Music Awards - Album of the Year	Won
1981	Sharon O'Neill	Australian Countdown Awards - Most Popular Female	Won
1982	Sharon O'Neill	Australian Countdown Awards - Most Popular Female	Nominated
1983	Sharon O'Neill	Australian Countdown Awards - Most Popular Female	Won
1983	Smash Palace	New Zealand Music Awards - Best Film Soundtrack/Cast Recording/Compilation	Won
1984	Sharon O'Neill	Australian Countdown Awards - Best Female Performance in a Video	Won
1984	Sharon O'Neill	Australian Countdown Awards - Most Popular Female Performer	Won
1984	Sharon O'Neill	Australian Countdown Awards - Best Songwriter	Nominated
1985	"Power"	Australian Countdown Awards - Best Female Performance in a Video	Won
1988	Sharon O'Neill	ARIA Music Awards - Best Female Artist	Nominated
1989	"We're Only Human"	ARIA Music Awards - Best Female Artist	Nominated
2017	Sharon O'Neill	New Zealand Music Hall of Fame	inductee
