= Danger (Sharon O'Neill song) =

Single by Sharon O'Neill

from the album Foreign Affairs
- Released: October 1983
- Recorded: Sydney, Australia
- Genre: Pop
- Length: 4:06
- Label: CBS Records
- Songwriter(s): Sharon O'Neill
- Producer(s): John Boylan

Sharon O'Neill singles chronology
"Maxine" (1983)	"Danger" (1983)	"Power" (1984)

"Danger" is a song by New Zealand singer songwriter Sharon O'Neill. The song was released in October 1983 as the third and final single from her fourth studio album, Foreign Affairs (1983). The song peaked at number 78 in Australia.

== Track listing ==
7" (BA 223116)

- Side A "Danger" – 4:06
- Side B "Hearts on the Run" – 3:50

== Personnel ==
Credits adapted from the liner notes of Foreign Affairs.

- Sharon O'Neill – lead and backing vocals, OB-Xa, Rhodes piano
- Karla Bonoff – backing vocals
- Mike Botts – drums
- John Boylan – production
- Scott Chambers – bass
- Tommy Funderburk – backing vocals
- Paul Grupp – tambourine
- Bobbye Hall – congas
- Marcy Levy – backing vocals
- Brent Thomas – electric guitar

== Charts ==
Chart (1983)	Peak position
Australian Kent Music Report	78
