= For All the Tea in China =

Single by Sharon O'Neill

from the album Maybe
- Released: March 1982
- Recorded: Sydney, Australia
- Genre: Pop
- Length: 3:19
- Label: CBS Records
- Songwriter(s): Sharon O'Neill
- Producer(s): Peter McIan

Sharon O'Neill singles chronology
"Maybe" (1981)	"For All the Tea in China" (1982)	"Losing You" (1982)

"For All the Tea in China" is a song by New Zealand singer songwriter Sharon O'Neill. The song was released in March 1982 as the third and final single from her third studio album, Maybe (1981). O'Neill performed the song on Countdown.

== Track listing ==
7" (BA 222918)

- Side A "For All the Tea in China" – 3:19
- Side B "I Don't Wanna Touch You (I Just Wanna Ride In Your Car)" – 2:57

== Personnel ==
Credits adapted from the liner notes of Maybe.

- Sharon O'Neill – lead and backing vocals, keyboards
- Tommy Emmanuel – electric guitar
- Richard Harvey – mastering
- Steve Hopes – drums, percussion
- Peter McIan – production
- Erik Scott – bass guitar

== Charts ==
Chart (1982)	Peak position
Australian Kent Music Report	98
