= Losing You (Sharon O'Neill song) =

Single by Sharon O'Neill

from the album Foreign Affairs
- Released: March 1983
- Recorded: Sydney, Australia
- Genre: Pop
- Label: CBS Records
- Songwriter(s): Sharon O'Neill
- Producer(s): John Boylan

Sharon O'Neill singles chronology
"For All the Tea in China" (1982)	"Losing You" (1983)	"Maxine" (1983)

"Losing You" is a song by New Zealand singer and songwriter Sharon O'Neill. The song was released in March 1983 as the lead single from her fourth studio album, Foreign Affairs (1983). O'Neill performed the song live on the Countdown on 6 March 1983. The song peaked at number 26 in Australia in June 1983.

== Track listing ==
7" (BA 223029)

- Side A "Losing You"
- Side B "Don't Let Yourself Drown"

== Personnel ==
Credits adapted from the liner notes of Foreign Affairs.

- Sharon O'Neill – lead and backing vocals, OB-Xa
- Michael Boddicker – Jupiter-8, vocoder
- Mike Botts – drums
- John Boylan – production
- Scott Chambers – bass
- Tommy Funderburk – backing vocals
- Tom Kelly – backing vocals
- Tom Scott – saxophone
- Brent Thomas – electric guitar, percussion

== Charts ==
Chart (1983)	Peak position
Australian Kent Music Report	26
