= Asian Paradise =

1980 single by Sharon O'Neill

Single by Sharon O'Neill

from the album Sharon O'Neill
- Released: April 1980
- Genre: Pop
- Length: 4:10
- Label: CBS Records
- Songwriter(s): Sharon O'Neill
- Producer(s): Jay Lewis

Sharon O'Neill singles chronology
"Don't Let Love Go" (1980)	"Asian Paradise" (1980)	"How Do You Talk to Boys" (1980)

"Asian Paradise" is a song by New Zealand singer and songwriter Sharon O'Neill. The song was released in April 1980 as the third single from her second studio album, Sharon O'Neill (1980)

== Track listing ==
New Zealand 7" (BA 461975)

- Side A "Asian Paradise" – 4:10
- Side B "Ready to Love" – 2:27

Australian 7" (BA 222776)

- Side A "Asian Paradise" – 4:10
- Side B "Awkward City"

== Personnel ==
Credits adapted from the liner notes of Sharon O'Neill.

- Sharon O'Neill – lead and backing vocals, piano
- Clinton Brown – bass
- Ross Burge – drums
- Jay Lewis – backing vocals, production
- Dennis Mason – percussion
- Wayne Mason – electric piano
- Steve Robinson – acoustic guitar

== Charts ==
Chart (1980)	Peak position
Australian Kent Music Report	76
New Zealand (Recorded Music NZ)	24

== When the Cat's Away version ==
"Asian Paradise"

Single by When the Cat's Away

from the album Live in Paradise
- Released: September 2001
- Genre: Pop
- Label: Capitol Records, EMI Music
- Songwriter(s): Sharon O'Neill

When the Cat's Away singles chronology
"Free Ride" (1990)	"Asian Paradise" (2001)

In 2001, New Zealand female vocal group When the Cat's Away recorded a version of "Asian Paradise". The song peaked debuted and peaked at number 16 in September 2001, surpassing the song's original peak in 1980. When performing the song on their live tours in 2001 and 2002, they were joined on stage by Sharon O'Neill at the start of the second chorus.

=== Charts ===
Chart (2001)	Peak position
New Zealand (Recorded Music NZ)	16
