= Waiting for You (Sharon O'Neill song) =

Single by Sharon O'Neill

from the album Maybe
- Released: June 1981
- Recorded: Sydney, Australia
- Genre: Pop
- Length: 3:28
- Label: CBS Records
- Songwriter(s): Sharon O'Neill
- Producer(s): Peter McIan

Sharon O'Neill singles chronology
| "How Do You Talk to Boys" (1980) | "Waiting for You" (1981) | "Maybe" (1981) |

"Waiting for You" is a song by New Zealand singer and songwriter Sharon O'Neill. The song was released in June 1981 as the lead single from her forthcoming third studio album, Maybe (1981). O'Neill performed the song live on the Countdown on 2 August 1981. The song peaked at number 50 in Australia.

== Track listing ==
7" (BA 222811)

- Side A "Waiting for You" – 3:28
- Side B "Love Can Be Cruel" – 3:25

== Personnel ==
Credits adapted from the liner notes of Maybe.

- Sharon O'Neill – lead and backing vocals, handclaps, keyboards
- Tommy Emmanuel – electric guitar
- Richard Harvey – handclaps, mastering
- Steve Hopes – drums
- Peter McIan – handclaps, production
- Erik Scott – bass guitar

== Charts ==
| Chart (1981) | Peak position |
|---|---|
| Australian Kent Music Report | 50 |
