= Maxine (Sharon O'Neill song) =

Single by Sharon O'Neill

from the album Foreign Affairs
- Released: May 1983
- Recorded: Sydney, New South Wales
- Genre: Pop
- Length: 4:35
- Label: CBS
- Songwriter: Sharon O'Neill
- Producer: John Boylan

Sharon O'Neill singles chronology
"Losing You" (1983)	"Maxine" (1983)	"Danger" (1983)

"Maxine" is a song by New Zealand singer and songwriter Sharon O'Neill. The song was released in May 1983 as the second single from her fourth studio album, Foreign Affairs (1983). The song peaked at number 16 in Australia and New Zealand. It remain's O'Neill's highest charting single in Australia.

== Background and release ==
Late in 1981, O'Neill moved from New Zealand to Sydney, New South Wales, Australia to pursue her music career. It was here that she wrote "Maxine", a song that chronicled the life of a Kings Cross prostitute. In a 2016 interview, O'Neill said; "I was living in a hotel in Kings Cross when I got the inspiration to write "Maxine". She was always out there working at 3am when we'd get home bleary-eyed from a gig"

Two music videos were filmed: one in New Zealand for general audiences, and the other in Sydney with far more explicit themes.

== Track listing ==
7" (BA 223082)

- Side A "Maxine" – 4:35
- Side B "All The Way Down" – 2:02

== Personnel ==
Credits adapted from the liner notes of Foreign Affairs.

- Sharon O'Neill – lead vocals, OB-Xa, Wurlitzer
- Mike Baird – drums
- John Boylan – production
- Bob Glaub – bass
- Carmen Grillo – backing vocals
- Bobbye Hall – congas
- David Lindley (Note: David Lasley is one of three credited backing vocalists on "Maxine." However, O'Neill stated in a 2001 interview that it was David Lindley who provided backing vocals.) – backing vocals
- Arnold McCuller – backing vocals
- Tom Scott – saxophone
- Brent Thomas – electric guitar

== Charts ==
Chart (1983)	Peak position
Australia (Kent Music Report)	16
New Zealand (Recorded Music NZ)	16

== Certifications ==
Region	Certification	Certified units/sales
New Zealand (RMNZ)	Gold	15,000^{‡}
^{‡} Sales+streaming figures based on certification alone.
