= Words (Sharon O'Neill song) =

Single by Sharon O'Neill

from the album Sharon O'Neill
- Released: (New Zealand) September 1979 (Australia) April 1980
- Recorded: 1979
- Studio: Marmalade Studios, Wellington
- Genre: Pop
- Length: 3:16
- Label: CBS Records
- Songwriter(s): Sharon O'Neill
- Producer(s): Steve Robinson

Sharon O'Neill singles chronology
"Don't Say No to Tomorrow" (1979)	"Words" (1979)	"Baby Don't Fight" (1979)

"Words" is a song by the New Zealand singer and songwriter Sharon O'Neill. The song was released in New Zealand in September 1979 as the lead single from her second studio album, Sharon O'Neill (1980). The song was released in Australia in April 1980 as her first single in that country.

== Track listings ==
New Zealand 7" (BA 222561)

- Side A "Words" - 3:16
- Side B "Face in a Rainbow"

Australia 7"

- Side A "Words" - 3:16
- Side B "Dance All Night"

== Personnel ==
Credits adapted from the liner notes of Sharon O'Neill.

- Sharon O'Neill – lead and backing vocals
- Clinton Brown – bass guitar
- Steve Garden – drums
- Wayne Mason – piano
- Simon Morris – backing vocals
- Steve Robinson – acoustic guitar, backing vocals, string machine, tambourine, production

== Charts ==
Chart (1979–1980)	Peak position
Australian Kent Music Report	56
New Zealand (Recorded Music NZ)	22
