= MC Hammer =

American rapper and dancer (born 1962)

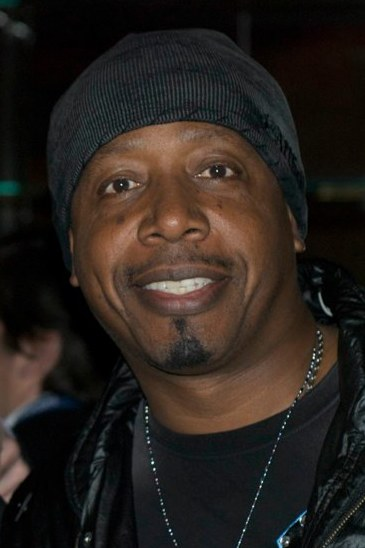
- Hammer in 2010

Background information
- Also known as: Hammerman; Hammer
- Born: Stanley Kirk Burrell; March 30, 1962 (age 64); Oakland, California, U.S.
- Genres: Hip-hop; pop rap
- Occupations: Rapper; songwriter; record producer; dancer; entrepreneur
- Years active: 1985–present
- Labels: Capitol; EMI; Death Row; Giant; Reprise; World Hit; Full Blast; Warner Bros.
- Spouse: Stephanie Burrell (m. 1985)
- Military career
- Allegiance: United States
- Branch: United States Navy
- Service years: 1981–1984
- Rank: Petty Officer Third Class
- Unit: VP-47

Stanley Kirk Burrell (born March 30, 1962), better known by his stage name MC Hammer (or simply Hammer), is an American rapper, record producer, entrepreneur, and dancer. He is known for hit songs such as "U Can't Touch This", "Pray", "2 Legit 2 Quit" and "Pumps and a Bump", as well as flashy dance movements, extravagant choreography and his namesake Hammer pants. Remembered for a rapid rise to fame, Hammer has also become an entrepreneur and celebrity spokesperson. A multi-award winner, he is considered a "forefather" and pioneering innovator of pop rap (incorporating elements of freestyle music).

Born and raised in Oakland, California, Hammer served three years in the United States Navy before independently releasing his debut album Feel My Power in 1986. After signing a contract with Capitol Records, Hammer released his second album Let's Get It Started in 1988, which became his first multi-platinum hit. Hammer became the first hip-hop artist to achieve diamond status with his next album Please Hammer Don't Hurt 'Em (1990), helping him become one of the most prominent media celebrities of the early 1990s. After being labeled a sell out by the changing landscape of hip-hop music which led to declining record sales for his fourth album, Too Legit to Quit (1991), Hammer unsuccessfully attempted to appeal to the rise of gangsta rap with his next album, The Funky Headhunter (1994). However, due to commercial overexposure, Hammer's popularity waned by the mid-1990s, which led to a highly publicized bankruptcy beginning in 1996. He has since released seven more albums, in addition to multiple songs after 2010.

In addition to a Mattel action figure doll and other merchandise, Hammer also starred in a Saturday-morning cartoon titled Hammerman (1991). He became an ordained preacher during the late 1990s and hosted MC Hammer and Friends, a Christian ministry program on TBN. Hammer was also a dance judge on Dance Fever in 2003, was the co-creator of the dance website DanceJam.com, and was executive producer of his own reality show titled Hammertime (which aired on the A&E Network during the summer of 2009).

Throughout his career, Hammer has managed his own recording business as a record label CEO. As a result, Hammer has created and produced his own acts/music including Ho Frat Hoo!, Oaktown's 3.5.7, Special Generation, Analise, DRS, B Angie B, Gentry Kozia and Oakland Fight Club. A part of additional record labels, he has associated, collaborated and recorded with Psy, VMF, Tupac Shakur, Teddy Riley, Felton Pilate, Tha Dogg Pound, The Whole 9, The Hines Brother, Deion Sanders, Big Daddy Kane, BeBe & CeCe Winans and Jon Gibson. Hammer signed with Suge Knight's Death Row Records in 1995.

BET ranked Hammer as the No. 7 "Best Dancer of All Time". Vibe's "The Best Rapper Ever Tournament" declared him the 17th favorite of all-time during the first round. He continues to perform concerts at music venues and appears in television advertisements, along with participating in social media and ministry/outreach functions. Hammer is also active in community and sports activities, being interviewed locally and nationally.

== Early life and education ==
Stanley Kirk Burrell was born in Oakland, California, on March 30, 1962. His father was a professional poker player and gambling casino manager (at Oaks Card Club's cardroom), as well as a warehouse supervisor. Hammer grew up poor with his mother (a secretary) and eight siblings in a small apartment in East Oakland. He recalled that six children were crammed into a three-bedroom housing project apartment. The Burrells would frequent thoroughbred horse races, eventually becoming owners and winners of several graded stakes.

In the Oakland Coliseum parking lot, the young Burrell would sell stray baseballs and dance accompanied by a beatboxer. Oakland Athletics team owner Charlie Finley saw the 11-year-old doing splits and hired Burrell as a clubhouse assistant and bat boy as a result of his energy and flair. Burrell served as a "bat boy" with the team from 1973 to 1980. In 2010, Hammer discussed his lifelong involvement with athletes on ESPN's First Take as well as explained that his brother Louis Burrell Jr. (who would later become Hammer's business manager) was actually the batboy while his job was to take calls and do "play-by-plays" for the A's absentee owner during every summer game. The colorful Finley, who lived in Chicago, used the child as his "eyes and ears". Reggie Jackson, in describing Burrell's role for Finley, took credit for his nickname:

Hell, our chief executive, the guy that ran our team, uh, that communicated [with] Charlie Finley, the top man there, was a 13-year-old kid. I nicknamed him "Hammer" because he looked like Hank Aaron [whose nickname was "The Hammer"].

Team players, including Milwaukee Brewers second baseman Pedro García, also dubbed Burrell "Little Hammer" due to his resemblance to Aaron. Ron Bergman, at the time an Oakland Tribune writer who covered the A's, recalled that: He was an informant in the clubhouse, an informant for Charlie, and he got the nickname "Pipeline". According to Hammer:

Charlie said, "I'm getting you a new hat. I don't want you to have a hat that says "A's" on it. I'm getting you a hat that says 'Ex VP,' that says 'Executive Vice President.' You're running the joint around here." ... Every time I come down to the clubhouse, you know, Rollie would yell out "Oh, everybody be quiet! Here comes Pipeline!"

Burrell acquired the nickname "MC" for being a "master of ceremonies", which he used when he began performing at various clubs while on the road with the A's, and eventually in the military. Hammer, who played second base in high school, dreamed of being a professional baseball player but did not make the final cut at a San Francisco Giants tryout. However, he has been a participant and a player in the annual Taco Bell All-Star Legends and Celebrity Softball Game, wearing an A's cap to represent Oakland (American League).

Burrell went on to graduate from McClymonds High School in Oakland in 1980 and took undergraduate classes in communications. Discouraged by his studies at a local college and failing to win a place in a professional baseball organization, Burrell joined the United States Navy. He served with PATRON (Patrol Squadron) FOUR SEVEN (VP-47) of NAS Moffett Field in Mountain View, California, as a petty officer third class aviation storekeeper (AK3), until his honorable discharge after three years.

== Music and entertainment career ==
Before Hammer's successful music career and "rags-to-riches-to-rags-and-back saga", Burrell formed a Christian rap group with singer and musician Jon Gibson known as the Holy Ghost Boy(s). Hammer and Tramaine Hawkins performed with Gibson's band, in concerts at various venues such as the Beverly Theatre in Beverly Hills. Some early songs produced were "Word", "B-Boy Chill" and "Stupid Def Yal" (1987). Hammer also produced "Son of the King" during this time, releasing it on his debut album Feel My Power (1986), as well as the re-released version Let's Get It Started (1988). Additionally, "The Wall" featured Hammer (a song Burrell originally identified himself as MC Hammer), which was later released on Gibson's album Change of Heart (1988). This was CCM's first rap hit by a blue-eyed soul singer and/or duo.

In addition to later remixes of early releases, Hammer produced and recorded many rap songs that were never made public, yet are now available on the Internet. Through his record labels such as Bust It Records, Oaktown Records and Full Blast—Hammer has introduced, signed and/or produced new talent including: Oaktown's 3.5.7, Ho Frat Hoo!, the vocal quintet Special Generation, Analise, James Greer, One Cause One Effect, B Angie B, The Stooge Playaz, DASIT as seen on Ego Trip's The (White) Rapper Show, Teabag, Common Unity, Geeman and Pleasure Ellis (all collaborating with him and/or producing music of their own during his career). At around age 12, Oakland native Keyshia Cole recorded with Hammer and sought career advice from him.

=== Feel My Power (1986) ===
In the mid-1980s, while rapping in small venues and after a record deal went sour, Hammer borrowed US$20,000 each from former Oakland A's players Mike Davis and Dwayne Murphy to start an independent record label business. As the CEO of Bust It Productions, Hammer kept the company going by selling records from his basement and car. Bust It Records spawned Bustin' Records, and collectively the companies had more than 100 employees. Recording singles and selling them out of the trunk of his car, he marketed himself relentlessly. Coupled with his dance abilities, Hammer's style was unique at the time.

Now billing himself as "MC Hammer", he recorded songs for his debut album Feel My Power in 1986. It was originally released on Hammer's independent label, Bustin' Records (via Oaktown Records), and produced by Felton Pilate of Con Funk Shun. It sold over 60,000 copies and was distributed by City Hall Records. Hammer released singles from the album, including "Ring 'Em" in 1987. Largely on the strength of tireless street marketing by Hammer and his wife, in addition to continuous radio play, it achieved considerable popularity at dance clubs in the San Francisco Bay Area. In spring 1988, Tony Valera (a 107.7 KSOL Radio DJ), played the track "Let's Get It Started" in his mix-shows. The track also gained popularity in nightclubs. Hammer declared he was "second to none from Doug E. Fresh, LL Cool J or DJ Run" within the song. He would continue to call out other East Coast rappers in future projects as well.

Heartened by his rising prospects, Hammer launched into seven-day-a-week rehearsals with the growing troupe of dancers, musicians and backup vocalists he had hired. It was Hammer's stage show and his infectious stage presence that led to his big break in 1988 while performing in an Oakland club. There, Hammer impressed a record executive who "didn't know who he was, but knew he was somebody", according to the New Rolling Stone Encyclopedia of Rock & Roll. Though Hammer had previously received and declined offers from major record labels before, he agreed to a multi-album contract with Capitol Records with a $1,750,000 advance. It did not take long for Capitol to recoup its investment.

=== Let's Get It Started (1988) ===
Once signed to Capitol Records, Hammer re-issued his first record (a revised version of Feel My Power) with additional tracks added, which sold over two million copies. "Pump It Up" (also performed during Showtime at the Apollo on September 16, 1989), "Turn This Mutha Out", "Let's Get It Started" and "They Put Me in the Mix" were the most popular singles from this album (which all charted). Not entirely satisfied with this first multi-platinum success, Hammer's music underwent a metamorphosis, shifting from the standard rap format. "I decided the next album would be more musical," he said at the time. Purists chastised Hammer for being more dancer than rapper. Sitting in a leopard-print bodysuit before a concert, he defended his style: "People were ready for something different from the traditional rap style. The fact that the record has reached this level indicates the genre is growing."

Hammer was close friends with Arsenio Hall (as well as a then-unknown teen named Vanilla Ice, despite later rumors that there was a "beef" between the two rappers which was addressed during the height of both their careers on Hall's show, and whom he would later reunite with in a 2009 concert in Salt Lake City, Utah), and as such, Hammer was first invited to perform the song "U Can't Touch This", prior to its release, on The Arsenio Hall Show in 1989. He also performed "Dancing Machine" which later appeared in the Please Hammer Don't Hurt 'Em: The Movie (1990).

Hammer used some of the proceeds from this album to install a rolling recording studio in the back of his tour bus, where Hammer recorded much of his second album. In 1989, Hammer was featured on "You've Got Me Dancing" with Glen Goldsmith, which appeared on Goldsmith's album Don't Turn This Groove Around via RCA Records. The track was Hammer's first release in the UK. He also appeared in Glen Goldsmith's music video for this song. The single failed to chart. During this period, Hammer formed the rap group Oaktown's 3.5.7, releasing the No. 9 single "Yeah! Yeah! Yeah!" from the album Wild & Loose (1989).

=== Please Hammer Don't Hurt 'Em (1990) ===
Hammer's third album (and second major-label release), Please Hammer Don't Hurt 'Em, was released on February 12, 1990 (with an original release date of January 1, 1990). It included the successful single "U Can't Touch This" (which sampled Rick James' "Super Freak"). The album was produced, recorded, and mixed by Felton Pilate and James Earley on a modified tour bus while on tour in 1989. Despite heavy airplay and a No. 27 chart debut, "U Can't Touch This" stopped at No. 8 on the Billboard Hot 100 chart. However, the album was a No. 1 success for 21 weeks primarily due to this single, the first time ever for a recording on the pop charts. "U Can't Touch This" has been and continues to be used in many films and television shows and also appears on soundtrack and compilation albums (such as Man of the House and Back 2 Back Hits).

Follow-up successes included a cover of the Chi-Lites' "Have You Seen Her" and "Pray" (a beat sampled from Prince's "When Doves Cry" and Faith No More's "We Care a Lot"), which was his biggest hit in the United States, peaking at No. 2. "Pray" was also a major UK success, peaking at No. 8. The album went on to become the first hip-hop album to earn diamond status, selling more than 18 million units to date. During 1990, Hammer toured extensively in Europe which included a sold-out concert at the National Exhibition Centre in Birmingham. With the sponsorship of PepsiCo International, Pepsi CEO Christopher A. Sinclair went on tour with him during 1991.

The album was notable for sampling other high-profile artists and gave some of these artists a new fan base. "Dancin' Machine" sampled The Jackson 5, "Help the Children" (also the name of an outreach foundation Hammer started) interpolates Marvin Gaye's "Mercy Mercy Me (The Ecology)", and "She's Soft and Wet" also sampled Prince's "Soft and Wet". All the songs were complimented by the background vocals of his singing group, Special Generation: this combination of sound made this album to be successful on radio and video television, with "U Can't Touch This," "Pray" (most successful), "Have You Seen Her", "Here Comes the Hammer" and "Yo!! Sweetness" (UK only) all charting. The album increased the popularity of hip hop music. It remains the genre's all-time best-selling album.

Music videos from this and previous albums began to receive much airplay on MTV and VH1. A movie also accompanied the album, and was produced in 1990, entitled Please Hammer Don't Hurt 'Em: The Movie (with portions of his music videos included within the movie). Around this time, Hammer appeared in the West Coast Rap All-Stars posse cut "We're All in the Same Gang" (which charted and was nominated at the 33rd Annual Grammy Awards for Best Rap Performance by a Duo or Group in 1991). Hammer also released the tracks "This is What We Do" on the Teenage Mutant Ninja Turtles movie soundtrack (1990) and "That's What I Said" on the Rocky V soundtrack (1990).

Hammer was also featured on "Wanna Be the Man" (included music video) and "For the Love of You" from Earth, Wind & Fire's 1990 Heritage album. "For the Love of You" peaked at No. 19 on the Billboard Hot R&B Singles chart and No. 12 on the Cashbox Top R&B Singles chart. After Hammer signed One Cause One Effect, "Up with Hope, Down with Dope" (included music video) reached No. 77 on the Hot R&B Singles chart (5 weeks) and "Midnite Lover" (featuring B Angie B) peaked at No. 58 on the Hot R&B Singles chart (11 weeks). Both songs were from their album Drop the Axxe (1990), which peaked at No. 51 on the Top R&B/Hip-Hop Albums chart.

A critical backlash began over the repetitive nature of his lyrics, his clean-cut image, and his perceived over-reliance on sampling entire hooks by others for the basis of his singles (criticisms also directed to his contemporary Vanilla Ice). He was mocked in music videos by 3rd Bass (including a rap battle with MC Serch), The D.O.C., DJ Debranz and Ice Cube. Oakland hip-hop group Digital Underground criticized him in the CD insert of their Sex Packets album, by placing Hammer's picture in it and referring to him as an unknown derelict. Q-Tip criticized him in "Check the Rhime", saying: "What you say Hammer? Proper. Rap is not pop, if you call it that then stop." LL Cool J dissed him in "To da Break of Dawn" (from his Mama Said Knock You Out album), calling Hammer an "amateur, swinging a Hammer from a body bag [his pants]" and stated: "my old gym teacher ain't supposed to rap." However, it could have been a response to Hammer calling him out in "Let's Get it Started", when he was mentioned along with Run-DMC and Doug E. Fresh as rappers that Hammer claimed to be better than. LL Cool J would later compliment and commend Hammer's abilities/talents on VH-1's 100 Greatest Songs of Hip Hop, which aired in 2008. Ice-T came to Hammer's defense on his 1991 album O.G. Original Gangster: "A special shout out to my man MC Hammer. A lot of people diss you man, but they just jealous." Ice-T later explained that he had nothing against people who were pop rap from the start, but rather emcees who switch from being hardcore or "dirty" to pop rap, in order to sell more records.

Despite the criticisms, Hammer's career continued to be highly successful, including tours in Asia, Europe, Australia and Russia. Soon after, M.C. Hammer Mattel action figure dolls, lunchboxes and other merchandise were marketed. He was also given his own Saturday-morning cartoon, titled Hammerman, which he hosted and voiced in 1991.

=== Too Legit to Quit (1991) ===
After publicly dropping the "MC" from his stage name, Hammer released Too Legit to Quit (also produced by Felton Pilate) in 1991. Hammer answered his critics within certain songs from the album. Sales were strong (over five million copies), with the title track being the biggest hit single from this record. The album peaked in the Top 5 of the Billboard 200. Another hit came soon after, with "Addams Groove" (which appeared on both The Addams Family motion picture soundtrack and the vinyl and cassette versions of 2 Legit 2 Quit), reaching No. 7 in the US and No. 4 in the UK. His video for the song appeared after the movie.

Hammer set out on a high-profile tour promoting the album which included a stage show loaded with singers, dancers and backup musicians. In 1992, Boyz II Men joined the tour as an opening act. While traveling the country, their tour manager Khalil Roundtree was murdered in Chicago, and the group's future performances of "It's So Hard to Say Goodbye to Yesterday" were dedicated to him. As a result of this unfortunate experience, the song would help advance their success. Ultimately, however, the lavish show proved too expensive to support through album sales and it was cancelled partway through its scheduled run.

Music videos were produced for all four singles released from this album (including "Do Not Pass Me By" and "This Is The Way We Roll"), all which charted. The "2 Legit 2 Quit" video featured many celebrity appearances and has been ranked as one of the most expensive videos ever made. The hand motions used within the song and video also became very popular. "2 Legit to Quit" proved to be successful in the US, peaking in the Top 10 at No. 5 on the Billboard Hot 100. Despite the album's multi-platinum certification, the sales were one-third of Please Hammer Don't Hurt 'Em.

At the end of the "2 Legit 2 Quit" video, after James Brown enlists Hammer to get the famous glove of Michael Jackson, a silver-white sequined glove is shown on the hand of a Michael Jackson look-alike doing the "2 Legit 2 Quit" hand gesture. In a related story, Hammer appeared on The Wendy Williams Show (July 27, 2009) and talked about his hit reality show Hammertime on A&E, his marriage, his role as a dad and the reasons he eventually went bankrupt. He told an amusing story about a phone call he received from "MJ", regarding the portion of the "2 Legit 2 Quit" video that included a fake Jackson, giving his approval and inclusion of it. He explained how Michael had seen the video and liked it, and both expressed they were fans of one another. Hammer and Jackson would later appear, speak and/or perform at the funeral service for James Brown in 2006. In 1991, Hammer was featured on the single "The Blood" from the BeBe & CeCe Winans album, Different Lifestyles. In 1992, the song peaked at No. 8 on the Christian charts.

=== New venture with Oaktown/Giant Records (1992–1993) ===
In 1992, after a four-year hiatus, Doug E. Fresh signed with Hammer's label, Bust It Records and issued one album, Doin' What I Gotta Do, which (despite some minor acclaim for his single "Bustin' Out (On Funk)" which sampled the Rick James 1979 single "Bustin' Out") was a commercial failure. Prior to Hammer's next album, The Funky Headhunter, rumors from critics and fans began claiming Hammer had quit the music/entertainment business or had suffered a financial downfall (since a couple of years were passing between his two records), which Hammer denied. Hammer claimed rumors falsely heralded his downfall were most likely a result of the fact he turned over his "trimmed-down" Bust It Records to his brother and manager Louis Burrell Jr., and his horse racing interests to his brother Chris and their father, Louis Burrell Sr.

During his hiatus between albums, Hammer consequently signed a multi-million-dollar deal with a new record company. He said there were a lot of bidders, but "not too many of them could afford Hammer". Therefore, Hammer parted ways with Felton Pilate (who had previously worked with the successful vocal group Con Funk Shun) and switched record labels to Giant Records, taking his Oaktown label with him. Hammer was eventually sued by Pilate. Hammer also launched a new enterprise, called Roll Wit It Entertainment & Sports Management, with clients such as Evander Holyfield, Deion Sanders and Reggie Brooks. In 1993, his production company released the hit rap song "Gangsta Lean" by DRS (from their debut album Gangsta Lean).

By this time, Hammer also parted ways with his only female executive music business administration consultant and songwriter, Linda Lou McCall (who previously worked with the Delfonics and her husband Louis A. McCall, Sr.'s band Con Funk Shun). A music industry vet, McCall was hired by Hammer's brother and manager Louis K. Burrell, in 1990. She helped set up his corporate operations and administration, at Bust It Management & Productions Inc. in Oakland, California. McCall later became Vice President of Hammer's talent management company, overseeing artists like Heavy D, B Angie B and Ralph Tresvant. While at Bust It, she and her husband brought their artist Keith Martin to Felton's attention, who hired him as a backup musician and vocalist for Hammer's Please Hammer Don't Hurt 'Em and Too Legit to Quit world tours.

With a new home and daughter, a new record soon to be released and his new business, Hammer claimed that he was happy and far from being broke during a tour of his mansion for Ebony. "Today there is a more aggressive Hammer, because the '90s require you to be more aggressive," Hammer said of his music style. "There is a harder edge, but I'm no gangsta. Hammer in the '90s is on the offense, on the move, on the attack. And it's all good."

=== The Funky Headhunter and Prime Time (1994) ===
In 1993, Hammer began recording his fifth official album. To adapt to the changing landscape of hip-hop, this album was a more aggressive sounding album entitled The Funky Headhunter. He co-produced this record with funky rapper and producer, Stefan Adamek. While Hammer's appearance changed to keep up with the gangsta rap audience, his lyrics still remained honest and somewhat clean with minor profanity. Yet, as with previous records, Hammer would continue to call out and disrespect other rappers on this album. As with some earlier songs such as "Crime Story" (from the album Please Hammer Don't Hurt 'Em), the content and reality about "street life" remained somewhat the same, but the sound was different, resulting in Hammer losing favor with fans. This album peaked at number two on the R&B charts and remained in the Top 30 midway through the year. The album was eventually certified platinum.

Hammer debuted the video for "Pumps and a Bump" during another appearance on The Arsenio Hall Show during the mid-1990s. Host Arsenio Hall said to Hammer, "Women in the audience want to know, what's in your speedos in the 'Pumps and a Bump' video?" A clip from the video was then shown, to much approval from the audience. Hammer didn't give a direct answer, but instead laughed. Arsenio then said, "I guess that's why they call you 'Hammer.' It ain't got nothin' to do with Hank Aaron."

The video to the album's first single, "Pumps and a Bump", was banned from heavy rotation on MTV with censors claiming that the depiction of Hammer in Speedos (and with what appeared to be an erection) was too graphic. This led to an alternative video being filmed (with Hammer fully clothed) that was directed by Bay Area native Craig S. Brooks. "It's All Good" was the second single released from the album.

On December 20, 1994, Deion Sanders released Prime Time, a rap album on Hammer's Bust It Records label which featured the minor hit "Must Be the Money". "Prime Time Keeps on Tickin'" was also released as a single. Sanders, a friend of Hammer's, had previously appeared in his "Too Legit to Quit" music video, and his alter-ego "Prime Time" is also used in Hammer's "Pumps and a Bump" video. The song "Help Lord (Won't You Come)" appeared in Kingdom Come.

=== Inside Out, Death Row Records and Too Tight (1995–1996) ===
In 1995, Hammer released the album Inside Out. The album sold poorly compared to previous records (peaking at 119 on the Billboard Charts) and Giant Records dropped him and Oaktown Records from their roster. Songs "Going Up Yonder" and "Sultry Funk" managed to get moderate radio play (even charting on national radio station countdowns). Along with a fickle public, Hammer would go on to explain in this album that he felt many of his so-called friends (who he had helped) had used and betrayed him. Their abuse reportedly contributed to a majority of his financial loss (best explained in the song "Keep On" and the bio from this album). He would also hint about this again in interviews, including The Ellen DeGeneres Show in 2009.

In 1995, Hammer released "Straight to My Feet" (with Deion Sanders) from the Street Fighter soundtrack (released in December 1994). The song charted at No. 57 in the UK. Hammer's relationship with Suge Knight dates back to 1988. Hammer signed with Death Row Records by 1995, at the time home to Snoop Dogg and his close friend, Tupac Shakur. The label did not release the album of Hammer's music (titled Too Tight) while he had a career with them, although he did release versions of some tracks on his next album. However, Burrell did record tracks with Shakur and others, most notably the song "Too Late Playa" (along with Big Daddy Kane and Danny Boy). After the death of Shakur in 1996, Burrell left the record company. He later explained his concern about this circumstance in an interview on Trinity Broadcasting Network since he was in Las Vegas with Tupac the night of his death.

=== Return to EMI and Family Affair (1996–1998) ===
In October 1996, Burrell and Oaktown signed with EMI, which saw the release of a compilation album of Hammer's hit singles prior to The Funky Headhunter. The album, titled Greatest Hits, featured twelve former hits. In 1998, another "greatest hits" album, called Back 2 Back Hits, was produced and released by CEMA. Another compilation version of Back 2 Back was later released by Capitol Records in 2006. As Hammer's empire began to collapse when his last album failed to match the sales of its predecessors, and since he unsuccessfully attempted to recast himself in the "streetwise/hardcore rap" mold of the day, Hammer turned to a gospel-friendly audience.

In 1998, Hammer released his first album in his new deal with EMI, titled Family Affair, because it was to introduce the world to the artists he had signed to his Oaktown Records (Geeman, Teabag, and Common Unity) as they made their recording debut. Technically his seventh album since his debut EP, this record was highly promoted on Trinity Broadcasting Network (performing a more gospel version of "Keep On" from his album Inside Out), yet featured no charting singles and selling about 1,000 copies worldwide. The album also features a song written for Hammer by Tupac called "Unconditional Love". Hammer would later dance and read the lyrics to this song on the first VH1 Hip Hop Honors in 2004.

A double album mostly about faith and family values, additional tracks from Family Affair are: "Put It Down", "Put Some Stop in Your Game", "Big Man", "Set Me Free", "Our God", "Responsible Father Shout", "He Brought Me Out", (Geeman Intro), "Eye's Like Mine", "Never Without You", "Praise Dance Theme Song", "Shame of the Name", (Smoothout Intro), (Teabag Intro), "Silly Heart", "I Wish U Were Free", (Common Unity Intro), "Someone to Hold to You", "Pray" (1998), "Let's Get It Started" (1998), and with "Hammer Music/Shouts/Tour Info" announcements between songs. The compact discs are also "PC Ready" with interactive features. After this album, new projects were rumored to be in the works, including an album (War Chest: Turn of the Century) and a soundtrack to the film Return to Glory: The Powerful Stirring of the Black Man, but neither appeared.

=== The Hits and Active Duty (2000–2001) ===
In 2000, another compilation album was released, titled The Hits. Following the September 11, 2001 attacks, Hammer released his album, Active Duty, on his own World Hit Music Group label (the musical enterprise under his Hammertime Holdings Inc. umbrella) to pay homage to the ones lost in the terrorist attacks. The album followed that theme, and featured two singles (with accompanying videos), "No Stoppin' Us (USA)" and "Pop Yo Collar" (featuring Wee Wee) which demonstrates "The Phat Daddy Pop", "In Pop Nito", "River Pop", "Deliver the Pop" and "Pop'n It Up" dance moves. The album, like its predecessor, failed to chart and would not sell as many copies as previous projects. Hammer did however promote it on such shows as The View and produced a video for both singles.

This patriotic album, originally planned to be titled The Autobiography of MC Hammer, donated portions of the proceeds to 9/11 charities. Hammer shot a video for the anthem "No Stoppin' Us (USA)" in Washington, D.C., with several members of the United States Congress, who sang in the song and danced in the video. Present members of the United States House of Representatives included J. C. Watts, Eddie Bernice Johnson, Thomas M. Davis, Earl Hilliard, Alcee Hastings, Rep. Diane Watson (D-Calif.), Rep. Corrine Brown (D-Fla.) and Jesse Jackson Jr.

=== Full Blast (2004) ===
After leaving Capitol Records and EMI for the second time in his career, Hammer decided to move his Oaktown imprint to an independent distributor and released his ninth studio album, Full Blast (which was completed in late 2003 and released as a complete album in early 2004). The album would feature no charting singles and was not certified by the RIAA. A video was produced for "Full Blast", a song that attacks Eminem and Busta Rhymes for previous disrespect towards him. Some of the original songs didn't end up making the final album release. Guest artists included The Stooge Playaz, Pleasure, Rain, JD Greer and DasIt.

=== Look Look Look and Platinum MC Hammer (2006–2008) ===
After going independent, Hammer decided to create a digital label to release his tenth studio album, Look Look Look. The album was released in February 2006 and featured production from Scott Storch. The album featured the title-track single (Look Look Look) and a music video. It would sell much better than his previous release (300,000 copies worldwide).

"YAY" was produced by Lil Jon. "What Happened to Our Hood?" (featuring Sam Logan) was originally from Active Duty. "I Got It from the Town" was used in the movie but is only present in one scene instead of the originally planned two on The Fast and the Furious: Tokyo Drift (soundtrack).

In June 2007, Hammer released a military-inspired rap song with a political message to President George W. Bush about sending American troops back home from war, called "Bring Our Brothers Home". The video was filmed at the Santa Monica Pier.

In 2008, Platinum MC Hammer was released by EMI Records. The compilation consists of 12 tracks from Hammer's previous albums, with a similar playlist as former "greatest hits" records (with the exception of including a remix of "Hammer Hammer, They Put Me in a Mix" which includes rap lyrics that "They Put Me in a Mix" originally did not). An import was released by Capitol Records.

=== DanceJamtheMusic (2008–2009) ===
Since his 2006 album, Hammer continued to produce music and released several other raps that appeared on his social websites (such as Myspace and Dancejam.com) or in commercials, with another album announced to be launched in late 2008 (via his own record label Fullblast Playhouse). Talks of the tour and a new album were expected in 2009.

"Getting Back to Hetton" was made public in 2008 as a digital single. It was a departure for Hammer, bringing in funky deep soul and mixing it with a more house style. Released through licence on Whippet Digital Recordings, media reviews were said to be "disappointing". However, the song "I Got Gigs" from this album was used in a 2009 ESPN commercial and performed during Hammertime (as well as played while he danced just prior to introducing Soulja Boy during YouTube Live on November 22, 2008).

Other tracks and videos from the album included: "I Go" (produced by Lil Jon), "Keep It in Vegas", "Lookin' Out the Window", "Dem Jeans" (by DASIT), "Stooge Karma Sutra" (by The Stooge Playaz) and "Tried to Luv U" (by DASIT featuring Pleasure Ellis).

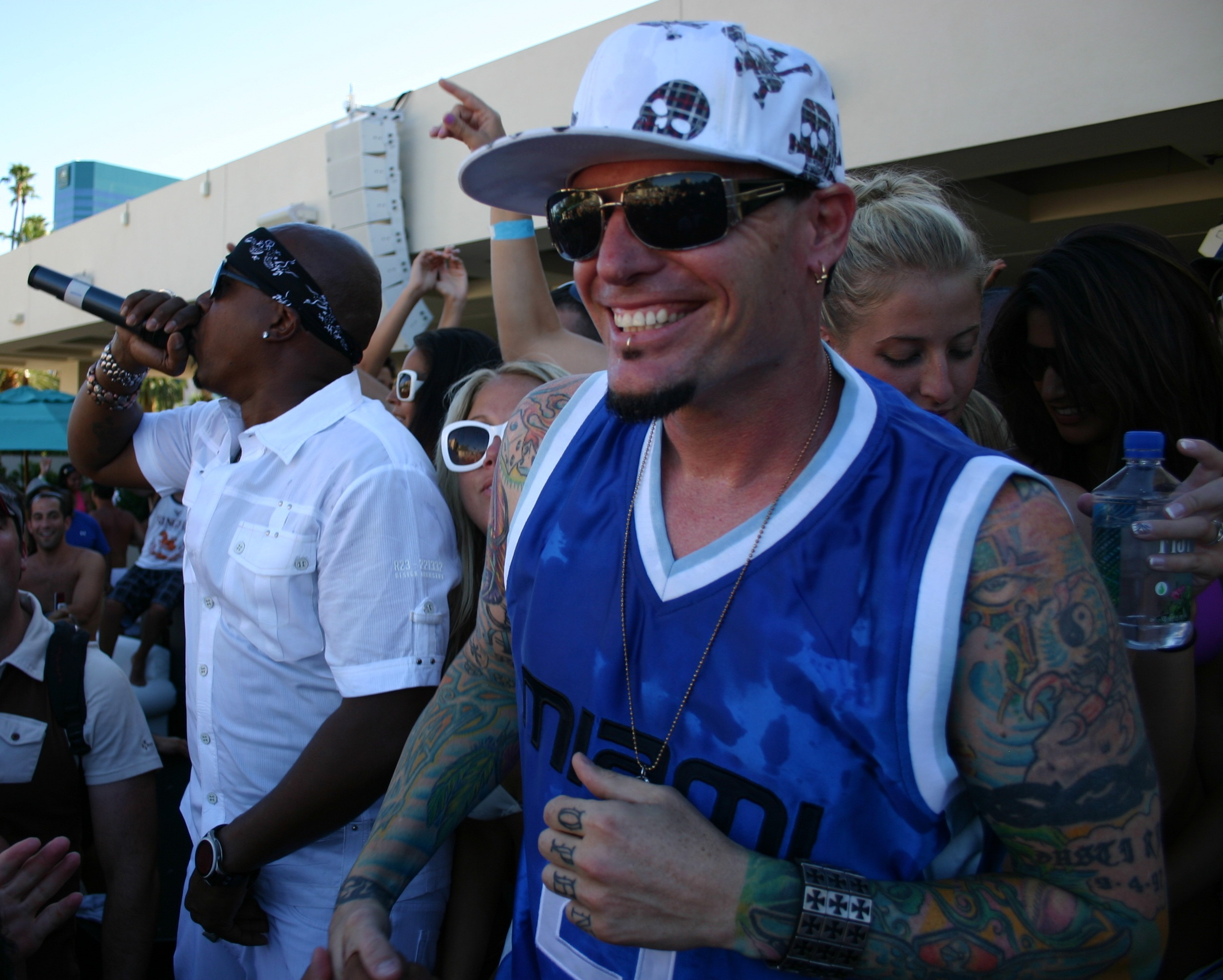
MC Hammer (left) performing with Vanilla Ice in 2009

In February 2009, MC Hammer and Vanilla Ice had a one-off concert at the McKay Events Center in Orem, Utah. This concert aided in the promotion of Hammer's new music and television show. During the concert (as shown during an episode of Hammertime), it was mentioned between the two rappers that this was their first headline show together in nearly 20 years, since the time when they were touring together at the peak of their hip-hop careers. Hammer said: "Contrary to popular belief, Ice and I are not only cool with each other, we are like long lost friends. I've known him since he was 16, before he had a record contract and before I had a record contract. It is a great reunion." Vanilla Ice said: "It's like no time has passed at all. We set the world on fire back in the day ... I'm so happy right now, the magic is here."

=== Most recent releases (2010–present) ===
==== "Better Run Run" (2010) ====
MC Hammer promised to release a track (expected on October 31, 2010) responding to a song by Kanye West featuring Jay-Z which attacked him. On the "So Appalled" track, which features Swizz Beatz and RZA, Jay-Z raps a verse targeting Hammer about his financial dilemma in the 1990s. On it, Jay says: 'Hammer went broke so you know I'm more focused / I lost 30 mil' so I spent another 30 / 'Cause unlike Hammer 30 million can't hurt me'. Hammer addressed his displeasure about the diss on Twitter, claiming he would react to Jay-Z on Halloween.

Hammer released a sample of his "beef" with Jay-Z in a brief teaser trailer called "Better Run Run" by 'King Hammer'. At one point, it was uncertain if his reaction would be a film video, a music video or a combination of both. Regardless, he claimed he would show evidence that 'Jigga worships the devil'. It is possible that Jay-Z was offended by an analogy Hammer was conveying in an earlier interview in response to "D.O.A. (Death of Auto-Tune)" on AllHipHop.

On November 1, Hammer's song with video called "Better Run Run!" hit the web in retaliation to Jay-Z's September 2010 diss towards him. Hammer accuses Jigga of being in league (and in the studio) with Satan—and then Hammer defeats the devil and forces Jay to be baptized. Speaking on the video, Jacob O'Gara of Ethos Magazine wrote: "What's more likely is that this feud is the last chapter in the tragic cautionary tale of MC Hammer, a tale that serves as a warning to all present and future kings of hip-hop. Keep your balance on the pedestal and wear the crown strong or you'll have the Devil to pay."

In an interview with BBC's DJ Semtex, Jay said he did not mean the verses as a personal attack. "I didn't know that [Hammer's financial status] wasn't on the table for discussion!" he said. "I didn't know I was the first person ever to say that..." He continued, "When I say things, I think people believe me so much that they take it a different way — it's, like, not rap anymore at that point. I say some great things about him in the book I have coming out [Decoded] — that wasn't a cheap plug," he laughed. "He's gonna be embarrassed, I said some really great things about him and people's perception of him. But it is what it is, he took it that wrong way, and I didn't know I said anything wrong!"

==== "See Her Face" (2011) ====
On February 3, 2011, MC Hammer appeared on The Oprah Winfrey Show premiering the track "See Her Face" via Flipboard. It was the first time Flipboard included music in the application.

==== "Raider Nation" and "All in My Mind" (2013–2014) ====
Among other songs, Hammer released "Raider Nation (Oakland Raiders Anthem)" along with a video in late 2013 and "All in My Mind" (which samples "Summer Breeze" by The Isley Brothers) in early 2014, with his newly formed group Oakland Fight Club (featuring Mistah F.A.B.).

==== Full Blast Music (2013–2018) ====
Additional hip-hop, R&B and soul tracks released via Hammer's Full Blast Music label include: "Better Man" (December 2013) by Gentry Kozia of the Oakland Fight Club, "Say It Isn't So" (December 2016) featuring Gentry Kozia, "Perfect Night" (March 2017) featuring Gentry Kozia, "Don't Stop" (September 2017) featuring Pleasure Ellis (remix from The Funky Headhunter), "Here We Go Again" (November 2017) featuring Gentry Kozia, "22 Pills" (December 2017) credited as BIG HAMM featuring Gentry Kozia, "Kalifornia Git Down" (December 2017) from the mixtape The Chronicles of Big Hamm (via BMI Publishing), "Best Life" (May 2018) featuring Gentry Kozia, and "Lit Up" (October 2018) featuring Booby Hammer and Ace Kayo.

==== "We Gotta Do Better" (2015) ====
Hammer released a visualizer music video for his song "We Gotta Do Better" featuring Gentry Kozia on April 22, 2015. It was posted on his personal blogspot via Vimeo.

==== "Help the Children" (2017) ====
Hammer released an updated version of his 1990 charting song with a short film video in late 2017.

==== "U R Everything" (2024) ====
Hammer released "U R Everything" with a music video in December 2024. The song samples "You Are Everything by The Stylistics.

== Additional business ventures ==
In 1991, Hammer established Oaktown Stable that would eventually have nineteen Thoroughbred racehorses. That year, his outstanding filly Lite Light won several Grade I stakes races including the prestigious Kentucky Oaks. His D. Wayne Lukas-trained colt Dance Floor won the Grade II Kentucky Jockey Club Stakes and the Breeders' Futurity Stakes in 1991, then the following year won the Fountain of Youth Stakes and finished 3rd in the 1992 Kentucky Derby. He continues to attend shows as well as many sporting events alongside celebrities. In the late 1990s into the early 2000s, along with a new clothing line called J Slick, Hammer began creating and working on MC Hammer USA, an interactive online portal.

In 2002, Hammer signed a book contract with publishing company Simon & Schuster which called for a release the following year. However, a manuscript for an inspirational book called Enemies of the Father: Messages from the Heart on Being a Family Man (addressing the situation of African American men), for which Hammer received advance money to write, was never submitted in 2003. This resulted in Hammer being sued by the book company over claims that he never finished the book as promised. The company's March 2009 lawsuit sought return of the US$61,000 advance given to Hammer for the unwritten book about fatherhood.

Hammer was a popular web mogul and activist, becoming involved in several Internet projects (including TechCrunch40 conferences). In 2007, Hammer was co-founder and chief strategy officer of Menlo Park-based (Silicon Valley) DanceJam.com along with Geoffrey Arone. The community site (valued at $4.5 million) was exclusively dedicated to dancing video competitions, techniques and styles which Hammer sometimes judged or rated.

In July 2010, Hammer started a mixed martial arts management company to manage, market, promote and brand-build for fighters. Artists included Nate Marquardt, Tim F. Kennedy and Vladimir Matyushenko, among others. According to MMAWeekly.com and Bizjournals, his new company was Alchemist Management based in Los Angeles, managing at least ten fighters. That same month, Hammer also announced an apparel line called Alchemist Clothing. The brand described as colorful lifestyle clothing debuted during an Ultimate Fighting Championship fight in Austin. Middleweight fighter Nate "The Great" Marquardt wore an Alchemist shirt as he walked out to the boxing ring. Hammer had shown an interest in boxing throughout his career.

On September 28, 2010, Hammer headlined at the TechCrunch Disrupt conference for an official after-hours party. Hammer appeared on The Oprah Winfrey Show in February 2011 to discuss his tech-media-mogul status, as well as his creation, demonstration and consulting of social applications/sites/media (such as having an involvement with the Internet since 1994 including YouTube and Twitter), and devices such as iPad and ZAGGmate by Zagg. He also explained how employing/helping so many people in the past never really caused him to be broke in terms of the average person, as the media made it seem, nor would he have changed any experiences that has led him to where he is today. During the "Whatever Happened to MC Hammer" episode, he discussed his current home, family and work life as well.

In October 2011, Hammer announced a new internet venture called WireDoo, a "deep search engine" that planned to compete with the major search engines, Google and Bing. With the motto, "Search once and see what's related", Hammer's team planned to eventually open up the site to a select number of beta testers. However, WireDoo never left beta mode.

=== Television and film career ===
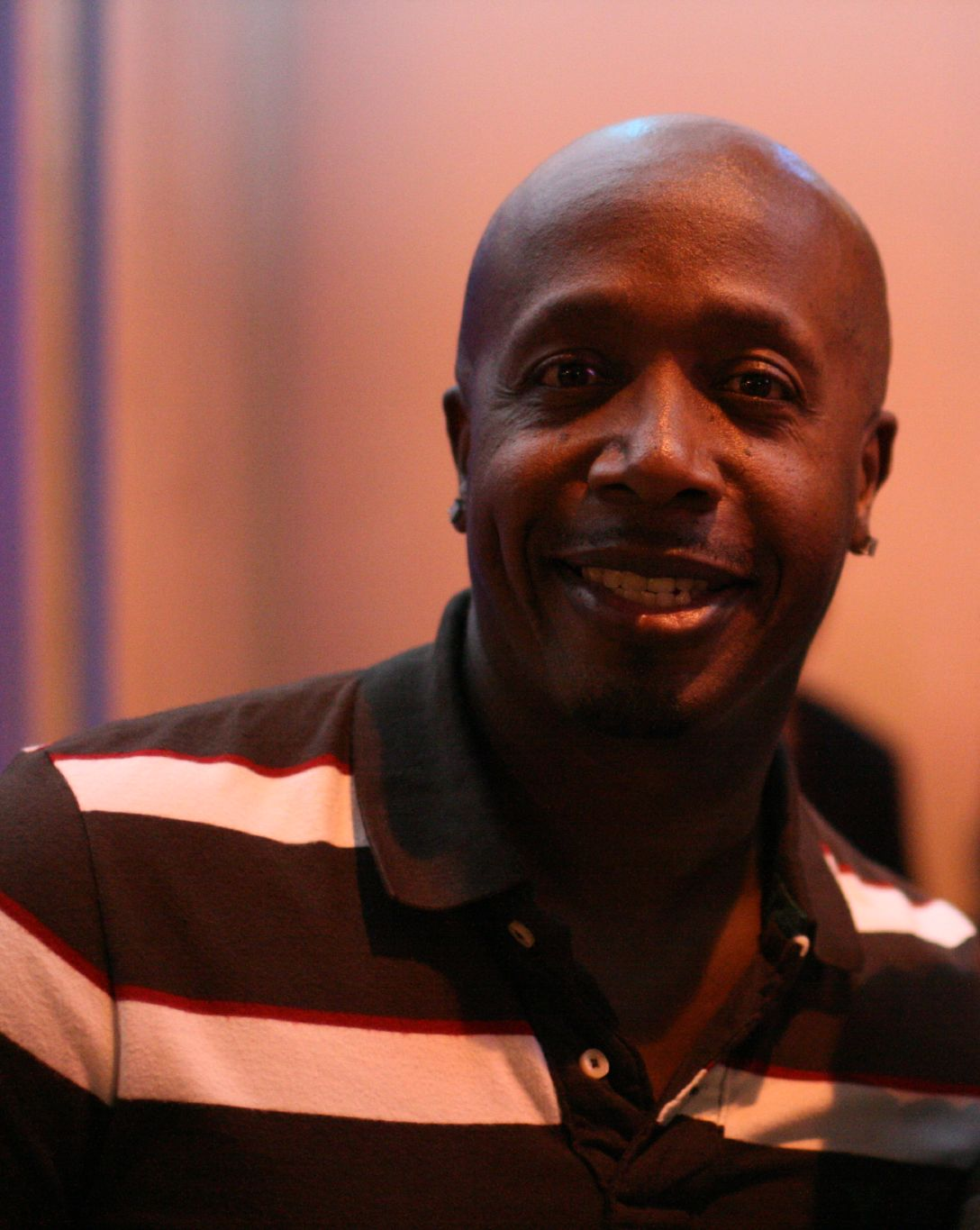
MC Hammer in 2008

Hammer produced and starred in his own movie, Please Hammer Don't Hurt 'Em: The Movie (1990). The film is about a rapper returning to his hometown who defeats a drug lord using kids to traffic his product. For this project, Hammer earned a Grammy Award for Best Long Form Music Video at the 33rd Grammy Awards (having been nominated for two). He later produced MC Hammer: 2 Legit (The Videos), which included many actors and athletes.

Hammer appeared in major marketing campaigns for companies such as Pepsi, KFC, Toshiba, British Knights and Taco Bell during the height of his career.

In 1991, Hammer hosted, sang/rapped and voiced a Saturday-morning cartoon called Hammerman. That same year, he and Bust It Productions (including B Angie B, Special Generation and Ho Frat Hoo!) appeared in concert from New Orleans on BET.

Hammer has made cameos and/or performed on many television shows such as Saturday Night Live (as host and musical guest), Amen and Martin. He also made a cameo in the 1993 Arnold Schwarzenegger film Last Action Hero. Hammer would also go on to appear as himself on The History of Rock 'N' Roll, Vol. 5 (1995). Additionally, he has been involved in movies as an actor such as, One Tough Bastard (1996), Reggie's Prayer (1996), the Showtime film The Right Connections (1997), Deadly Rhapsody (2001), Finishing the Game (2007) and 1040 (2010), as well as a television and movie producer.

Despite his financial status being publicly attacked, after meeting at the National Association of Broadcasters convention in Las Vegas in April 2001, Hammer (credited as a producer) provided the much-needed funding to filmmaker Justin Lin for Better Luck Tomorrow (2002). In its first ever film acquisition, MTV Films eventually acquired Better Luck Tomorrow after it debuted at The Sundance Film Festival. The director said, "Out of desperation, I called up MC Hammer because he had read the script and liked it. Two hours later, he wired the money we needed into a bank account and saved us."

Hammer appeared in two cable television movies. At the age of 39, he was one of the producers for the VH1 movie Too Legit: The MC Hammer Story, starring Romany Malco and Tangi Miller as his wife, which aired on December 19, 2001. The film is a biopic which chronicles the rise and fall of the artist. 2 Legit To Quit: The Life Story of MC Hammer became the second highest-rated original movie in the history of VH1 and broadcast simultaneously on BET. "The whole script came from me," says Hammer, "I sat down with a writer and gave him all the information."

In 2003, Hammer appeared on The WB's first season of The Surreal Life, a reality show known for assembling an eclectic mix of celebrities to live together. He was also a dance judge on the 2003 ABC Family TV series Dance Fever. Additionally, he appeared on VH1's And You Don't Stop: 30 Years of Hip-Hop (2004) as well as in 100 Greatest Songs of the 90s (2008), a countdown which he was also commentator on. His eldest child, A'Keiba Burrell, was a contestant on MTV's Rock the Cradle in April 2008 (which Hammer also made appearances on).

Hammer had shown an interest in having his own reality show with specific television networks at one point. Already being a part of shows for VH1 and The WB (I Married... MC Hammer and The Surreal Life), it was later confirmed he would appear in Hammertime on A&E in the summer of 2009. This reality show was about his personal, business and family life. The following year, Hammer appeared on Live with Regis and Kelly June 3, 2009, to promote his show which began June 14, 2009, at 10 p.m. Eastern Time Zone (EST).

In August 2008, a new ESPN ad featured Hammer in it, showcasing his single "I Got Gigs'" (from his DanceJamtheMusic album). The commercial was for Monday Night Football's upcoming football season. This is not the first commercial in more recent years that Hammer has been in, or his songs/raps/dancing was used for and included in such as Lay's, Hallmark Cards, Purell, Lysol, Nationwide Mutual Insurance Company, and Citibank. On February 1, 2009, Hammer and Ed McMahon were featured in a Super Bowl XLIII commercial for Cash4Gold.

In addition to appearing in television commercials, Hammer's music has also been used in television shows and movies, especially "U Can't Touch This" during: The Fresh Prince of Bel-Air (1990), Hot Shots! (1990), The Super (1991), Doogie Howser, M.D. (1992), Don't Be a Menace to South Central While Drinking Your Juice in the Hood (1996), Kung Pow! Enter the Fist (2002), Charlie's Angels: Full Throttle (2003), Into the Wild (2007), Tropic Thunder (2008), Dancing with the Stars (2009), Glee (2010) and many more. Additionally, "This Is What We Do" was a 1990 track by Hammer (featuring B Angie B) for the Teenage Mutant Ninja Turtles film and soundtrack. Tracks "That's What I Said" and "Feel My Power" were used for the Rocky V film and soundtrack. Some examples of other raps by Hammer used in movies and television were: "Addams Groove" (The Addams Family), "Pray" (License to Wed), "2 Legit 2 Quit" (Hot Rod), "I Got It from the Town" (The Fast and the Furious: Tokyo Drift), "Help Lord, Won't You Come" (Kingdom Come), "Let's Go Deeper" (Beverly Hills, 90210) and "Straight to My Feet" (Street Fighter).

Along with Betty White, Hammer was a voice actor on the September 17, 2010, episode of Glenn Martin, DDS called "Step-Brother". In 2016, MC Hammer appeared as himself in an episode of Uncle Grandpa on Cartoon Network. In June 2017, Hammer appeared during Beat Shazam on Fox. Hammer has most recently been a spokesman for 3M Command Strips and Starburst. In September 2020, Hammer appeared on The Greatest @Home Videos via Zoom. Beginning in March 2026, Hammer appeared in a GEICO "Hammer Time" commercial.

=== Dancer, choreographer and entertainer ===
Hammer's dance style not only helped pave the way for the San Francisco Bay Area movement called hyphy, but also helped to bring hip-hop and rap to the Bay Area. With his popular trademark Hammer pants, one difference from Hammer versus other performers during his heyday was that he was an entertainer, both during live shows and in music videos. His flamboyant dancing was as much a part of his performances as rapping and musical instruments were. With high-energy dance routines, he is often considered one of the greatest dancers. While adding his own techniques, Hammer adopted styles from James Brown and Nicholas Brothers such as the splits, as well as feverishly choreographed dance routines including leaps and slides. His creation of such dances as the "Hammer dance" (or the "typewriter dance") and "the bump" from "U Can't Touch This", as well as the "running man" and the "butterfly", made his flashy and creative dance skills unlike any others at the time.

Hammer's showmanship and elaborate stage choreography (involving 15 dancers, 12 backup singers, seven live musicians, and two-disc jockeys), gave him a powerful visual appeal. Hammer was the first rap artist to put together a choreographed show of this type, and his visual flair attracted heavy airplay for his videos on MTV, which at the time had a predominantly white viewership that had aired little rap music before Hammer.

During a 1990 visit from Hammer (accompanied by his friend Fab Five Freddy) on Yo! MTV Raps, one of the dancers whom Hammer was holding auditions for was then-unknown Jennifer Lopez. At the height of his career, Hammer had his legs insured for a substantial amount of money (into the millions), as mentioned in an interview by Maria Shriver in 1990. Hammer later suffered an injury to his knee that halted his dancing career for a period of time. Eventually, BET ranked Hammer as the seventh Best Dancer of All Time. Some of his entourage, or "posse" as he called them, were also trained/skilled dancers (including Tiffany Patterson). They participated in videos and at concerts, yet too many dancers and band members eventually contributed to Hammer's downfall, proving to be too much for him to finance.

Hammer stayed active in the dance media/genre, both on television shows and as co-founder of DanceJam.com (which showcased dance competitions and instructional videos on all the latest dance styles) until he and his partner Geoffrey Arone sold it to Grind Networks. Well known for bringing choreography to hip-hop, many of his dancing skills can still be seen on dance-focused and social networking sites. "Dance is unlike any other social medium. It's the core of our culture", Burrell told Wired.

In addition to his websites and Internet presence, Hammer has also appeared demonstrating much of his dancing abilities on talk shows such as The Arsenio Hall Show, Soul Train, Late Night with Conan O'Brien (performing O'Brien's famous "string dance" together as well), The Ellen DeGeneres Show and The View. Hammer was also a dance judge on Dance Fever. On June 3, 2009, he performed his "Hammer dance" on Live with Regis and Kelly with Will Ferrell as co-host.

While Hammer may have challenged and competed with Michael Jackson during the height of his career, they were friends, proven by a phone call Hammer had with Jackson about his "Too Legit to Quit" video which he shared on The Wendy Williams Show in July 2009. Hammer wanted to ensure he was not offended by the ending of the video where a purported Jackson (seen only from behind) does the "2 Legit 2 Quit" hand gesture with his famous glove. They also appeared together at the funeral service for James Brown in 2006, where Hammer danced in honor of the "Godfather of Soul". After Jackson's death, Hammer posted his remembrance and sympathy of the superstar on Twitter. Michael's friend and fellow pop culture icon Hammer told Spinner that, "now that the "King of Pop" has passed, it's the duty of his fans and loved ones to carry Jackson's creative torch." He went on to say, "Michael Jackson lit the fuse that ignited the spirit of dance in us all. He gave us a song and a sweet melody that will never die. Now we all carry his legacy with joy and pride."

In 2022, Bobby Brown claimed he started wearing the "diaper pants" that Hammer altered and made famous, on his A&E show Bobby Brown: Every Little Step. However, Brown wore a less sagging variation during some concerts and in music videos, such as "My Prerogative" (1988) and "Every Little Step" (1989).

== Personal life ==
At the time of his first album, Hammer opened his own music management firm. As a result of the success of his third album, Please Hammer Don't Hurt 'Em, Hammer had amassed approximately US$33 million. In 1997, Hammer sold his Fremont, California estate and mansion for US$5.3 million, after filing for bankruptcy in 1996. Hammer most recently resided in a large ranch-style adobe home, situated on a two-acre corner lot in Tracy, California, with his wife Stephanie. They met at a church revival meeting and married December 21, 1985. They have five children and also raised Hammer's nephew. It was reported in July 2012 that Hammer was encouraged to marry Whitney Houston by her father at the Super Bowl in 1991.

Hammer frequently posted about his life and activities on his blog "Look Look Look", as well as other social websites such as Facebook, Myspace and Twitter (being one of the earliest celebrities to contribute and join). A self-described "super geek" who consulted for or invested in eight technology companies, Hammer claimed to spend 10–12 hours daily working on his technology projects, and tweeted 30–40 times a day as of 2012. He has been noted as a popularizer and defender of philosophy in his social media posts, and has been quoted in academic philosophy publications. Hammer was an endorser of the SAFE California Act, which, if passed in November 2012, would have replaced the death penalty. However, the proposition was defeated.

=== Bankruptcy, lawsuits, and media reaction ===
Contrary to public rumor, Hammer claimed he was really never "down-and-out" as reported by the media (eventually expressed on The Opie & Anthony Show and The Ellen DeGeneres Show in 2009). Originally having an estimated net worth of over $33 million according to Forbes magazine, speculations about Hammer's status first emerged during delays between albums Too Legit to Quit and The Funky Headhunter, with Hammer having spent much of his money on staff and personal luxuries. In addition to excessive spending while supporting friends and family, Hammer ultimately became over $13 million in debt—due to dwindling album sales, unpaid loans, a large payroll, and a lavish lifestyle. Therefore, Hammer eventually filed for Chapter 11 bankruptcy at the U.S. Bankruptcy Court in Oakland, California, on April 1, 1996. The case was converted to Chapter 7 on September 23, 1998. However, Hammer was denied a bankruptcy discharge on April 23, 2002.

Hammer's mansion was sold for a fraction of its former price. "My priorities were out of order," he told Ebony. He said: "My priorities should have always been God, family, community and then business. Instead they had been business, business and business." Along with Felton Pilate and other group members, Rick James sued Hammer for infringement of copyright on "U Can't Touch This", but the suit was settled out of court when Hammer agreed to credit James as co-composer, effectively cutting James in on the millions of dollars the song was earning. By the late 1990s, Hammer seemed to stabilize himself and made himself ready to undertake new projects.

In 1992, Hammer had admitted in depositions and court documents to getting the idea for the song "Here Comes the Hammer" from a Christian recording artist in Dallas named Kevin Christian. Christian had filed a $16 million lawsuit against Hammer for copyright infringement of his song entitled "Oh-Oh, You Got the Shing". This fact, compounded with witness testimony from both Hammer's and Christian's entourages, and other evidence (including photos), brought about a settlement with Capitol Records in 1994. The terms of the settlement remain sealed. Hammer settled with Christian the following year.

In 1997, just prior to beginning his ministry, Hammer (who by that time had re-adopted "MC") was the subject of an episode of The Oprah Winfrey Show and the VH1 series Behind the Music (music from his album Inside Out was featured in this documentary). In these appearances, Hammer admitted "that [he] had already used up most of [his] fortune of over $20 million, proving that money is nothing if it doesn't bring peace and if priorities are wrong". He would go on to express a similar point in other interviews as well.

During numerous interviews on radio stations and television channels throughout the years, Hammer was constantly questioned about his bankruptcy. During an interview by WKQI-FM (95.5) for the promotion of his "Pioneers Of Hip Hop 2009" gig at the Fox Theatre in Detroit (which featured 2 Live Crew, Naughty by Nature, Too Short, Biz Markie and Roxanne Shanté), Hammer was asked about his finances by the Mojo in the Morning host. Hammer responded on Twitter, saying that Mojo was a "coward" and threatened to cancel commercials for his upcoming show.

On November 21, 2011, the U.S. government filed a lawsuit in Federal District Court in California against Hammer to obtain a court judgment on his unpaid taxes for years 1996 and 1997. In December 2011, this litigation was reported in the media. Hammer owed $779,585 in back taxes from his earnings dating back to 1996–1997; during the years, Hammer was believed to be facing his worst financial problems. After years of public and media ridicule regarding his financial problem, Hammer tried to assure fans and "naysayers" via Twitter, saying that he had proof he had already taken care of his debt with the IRS. "700k – Don't get too excited .. I paid them already and kept my receipt. Stamped by a US Federal Judge", Hammer tweeted from his account @MCHammer.

However, the District Court ruled against Hammer. He appealed, but, on December 17, 2015, the United States Court of Appeals for the Ninth Circuit rejected Hammer's argument that because the government had not listed those taxes in the government's proof of claim filed with the Bankruptcy Court, the government should be stopped from collecting the taxes. According to a 2017 episode of the Reelz TV series Broke & Famous, the situation was eventually resolved. As of the making of the aforementioned Broke & Famous episode, Hammer had a reported net worth of $1.5 million.

=== Obstruction charges ===
Hammer was arrested in 2013 in Dublin, California, for allegedly obstructing an officer in the performance of his duties and resisting an officer (according to "stop and identify" statutes). Hammer claims he was a victim of racial profiling by the police, stating an officer pulled out his gun and randomly asked him: "Are you on parole or probation?" Hammer stated that as he handed over his ID, the officer reached inside the car and tried to pull him out. Police in Dublin, east of Oakland, said Hammer was "blasting music" in a vehicle with expired registration and he was not the registered owner. "After asking Hammer who the registered owner was, he became very argumentative and refused to answer the officer's questions," police spokesman Herb Walters typed in an e-mail to CNN. Hammer was booked and released from Santa Rita Jail in Dublin. A court date was scheduled; however, all charges were dropped in early March. Hammer tweeted that he was not bitter and considered what happened "a teachable moment".

=== Christian beliefs and ministry ===
In 1984, Burrell began attending Bible studies, joined a street ministry, and formed a gospel rap group with Jon Gibson known as the Holy Ghost Boy(s). In 1986, Burrell and Tramaine Hawkins performed with Gibson's band in concerts at various venues, such as the Beverly Theatre in Beverly Hills. Several songs were recorded together, collaborating on "The Wall" from Gibson's album Change of Heart (1988), prior to Hammer's mainstream success. This was CCM's first rap hit by a blue-eyed soul singer and/or duo. Burrell also produced "Son of the King" at that time, releasing it on his debut album Feel My Power (1986).

Raised Pentecostal, Hammer strayed from his Christian faith during his success, before returning to ministry. His awareness of this can be found in a film he wrote and starred in called Please Hammer Don't Hurt 'Em: The Movie (1990), in which he also plays the charismatic preacher character named "Reverend Pressure". Nonetheless, as a tribute to his faith, Hammer vowed to dedicate at least one song on each album to God.

During 1991, Hammer was featured on the single "The Blood" from the BeBe & CeCe Winans album, Different Lifestyles. In 1992, the song peaked at No. 8 on the Christian charts. Hammer later reaffirmed his beliefs in October 1997, and began a television ministry called MC Hammer and Friends on the Trinity Broadcasting Network, as well as appearing on Praise the Lord programs where he went public about his devotion to ministry as an ordained minister. Hammer officiated at the celebrity weddings of actor Corey Feldman and Susie Sprague on October 30, 2002 (as seen on VH1's The Surreal Life), and also at Mötley Crüe's Vince Neil and Lia Gerardini's wedding in January 2005.

During an interview on TBN (between 1997 and 1998), Hammer claimed he adopted the "MC" back into his name which now stood for 'Man of Christ'. Hammer continued to preach while still making music, running a social media business and television show, and devotes time to prison and youth ministries. From 2009 to 2010, Hammer joined Jaeson Ma at a crusade in Asia. Minister and mentor to Ma for more than a decade, Hammer assisted and co-starred in his documentary film 1040, which explores the spread of Christianity throughout Asia.

== Legacy and pop culture fame ==
Because of his commercial success during early stages of hip-hop music, BET named Hammer as the first "mainstream" rapper. Hammer became a fixture of the television airwaves and the big screen, with his music being used in many popular shows, movies and commercials still to this day. Hammer appeared in major marketing campaigns for companies to the point that he was criticized as a "sellout", including commercials for British Knights during the height of his career. The shoe company signed him to a $138 million deal.

Hammer's impression on the music industry appeared almost as instantaneously as Digital Underground's rap "The Humpty Dance," which was released when Hammer was still early in his career and included the lyrics "People say ya look like M.C. Hammer on crack, Humpty!", boasting about Hammer's showmanship versus Humpty Hump (Shock G)'s inability to match it in dance. Additionally, Hammer had several costly videos, two in particular were "Too Legit to Quit" or "2 Legit 2 Quit" (in which many celebrities appeared) and "Here Comes the Hammer".

Hammer is well known for his fashion style during the late 80s and early 90s. In addition to Lone Mixer and his brother Louis, Hammer would tour, perform and record with members of his entourage, including hype man 2 Bigg MC or Too Big (releasing a song in which he claimed "He's the King of the Hype" in July 1990). This duo introduced the "shiny suit" and popularized Hammer pants to mainstream America, as seen in videos such as "(Hammer Hammer) They Put Me In A Mix", in which Hammer also claimed Too Big was the "King of Hype" and in an unspoken competition with Flavor Flav (hype man for Public Enemy) during the height of their careers.

Hammer also established a children's foundation, which first started in Hammer's own community, called Help The Children (HTC was named after and based on his song by the same name which included a music video with a storyline from his film Please Hammer Don't Hurt 'Em: The Movie). A Sesame Street segment features Elmo taking on the persona of Hammer; nicknaming himself "MC Elmo" and along with two backup singers they rap a song about the number five called "Five Jive".

In 1994, British TV presenter Mark Lamarr interrupted Hammer repeatedly with Hammer's catch phrase ("Stop! Hammer Time!") in an interview filmed for The Word, which he took in good humor. He claimed Hammer was a "living legend". It was also within this interview that Hammer explained the truth about his relationship with "gangsta rap" and that he was merely changing with the times, not holding onto his old image nor becoming a "hardcore gangsta". By some accounts, this change contributed to his decline in popularity.

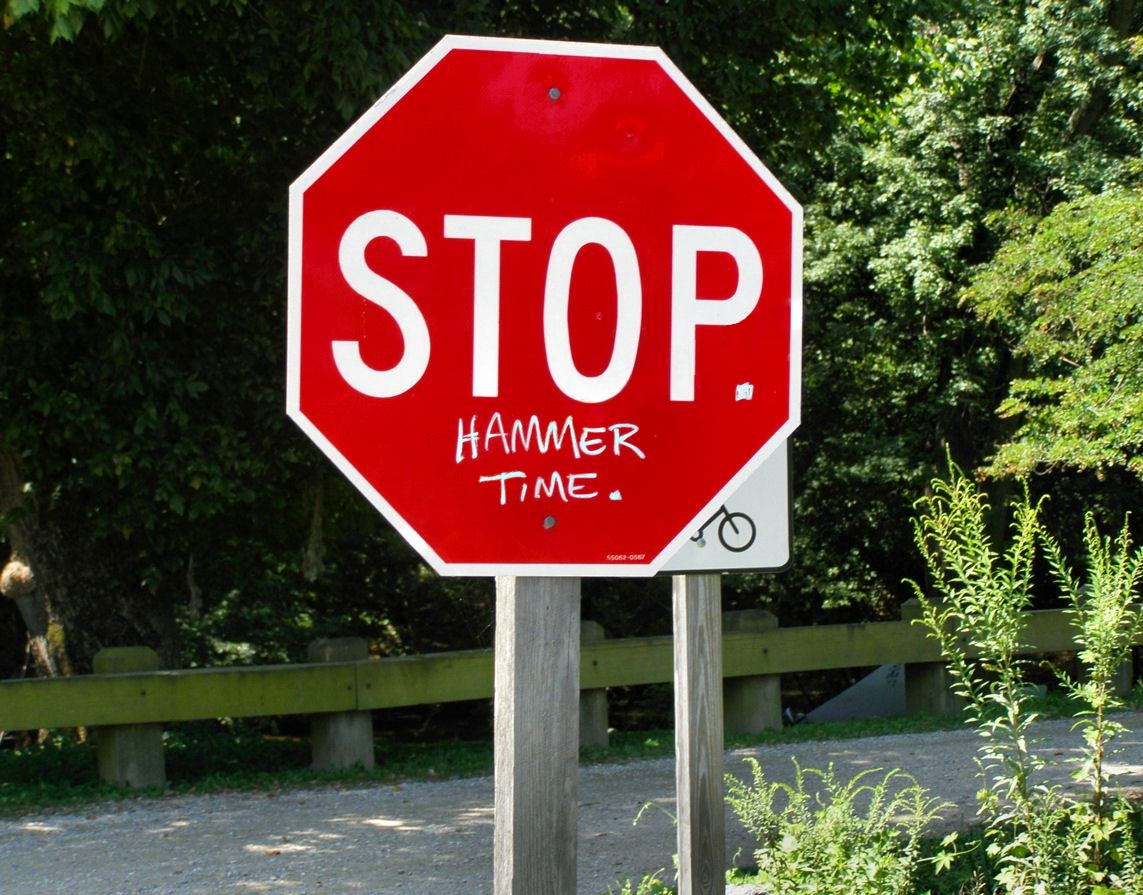
Hammer's catchphrase on graffiti in Maryland, USA

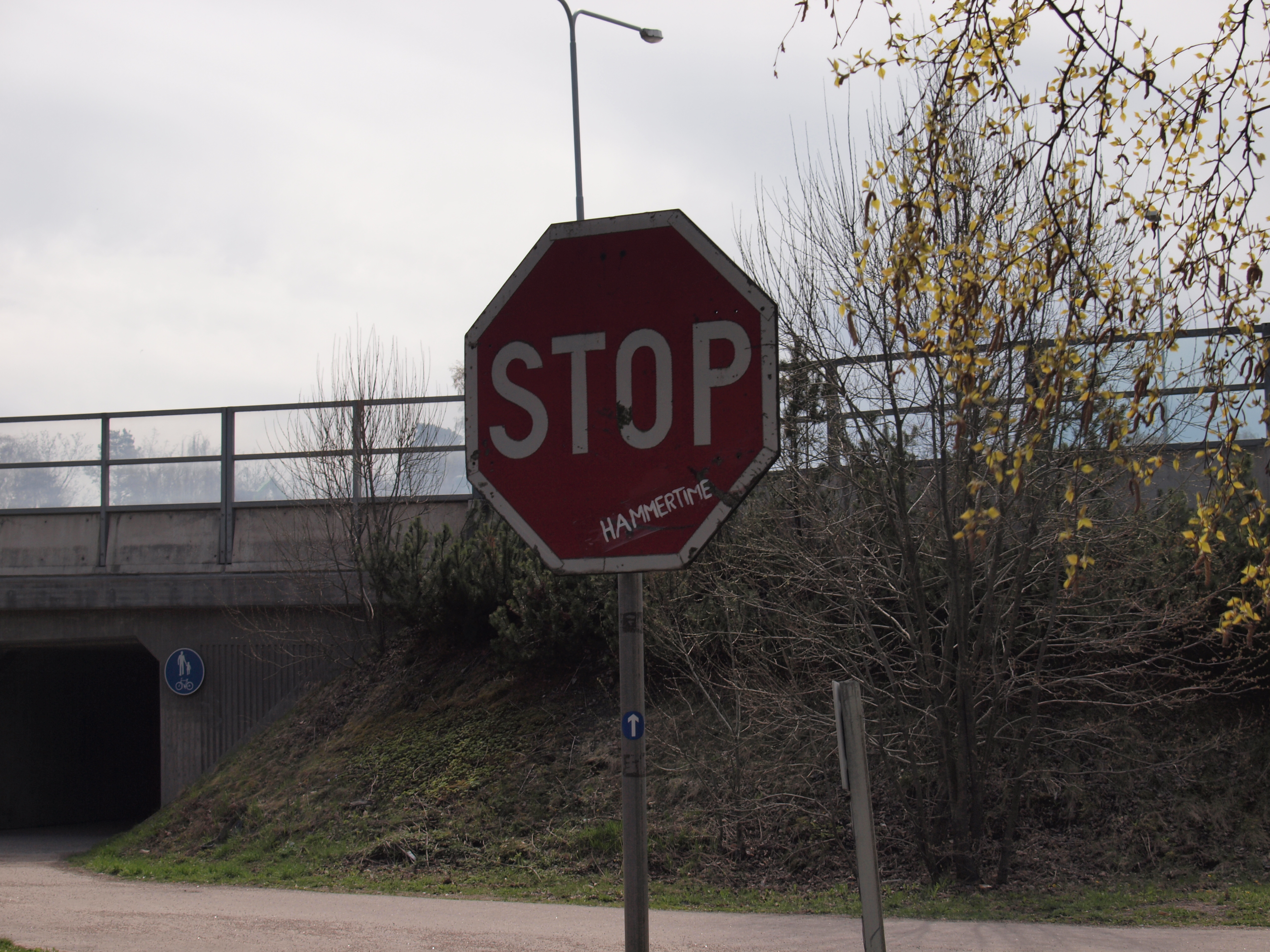
MC Hammer's catchphrase invoked in Helsinki, Finland in 2012

In 2005, Hammer appeared in a commercial for Nationwide Mutual Insurance Company which made a humorous reference to his career. First, he is shown in his distinctive clothing with his dance troupe performing "U Can't Touch This" in front of a mansion representative of his former house with a monogram H on the gable. Then there is silence and a screen card saying "Fifteen Minutes Later" appears with a view of Hammer sadly sitting on the curb in front of the same house as a crane removes the monogram H and tow trucks pull away sports cars that were parked in front. After a large "Foreclosed" sign appears, the voice-over said "Life comes at you fast. Be ready with Nationwide!"

In 2006, Hammer's music catalog was sold to the music company Evergreen/BMG for nearly $3 million. Evergreen explained that the collection was "some of the best-selling and most popular rap songs of all time". Speaking for Evergreen Copyrights, David Schulhof stated the songs "will emerge as a perfect fit for licensing in movies, television shows, and corporate advertising". According to VH1, "Hammer was on the money. Hit singles and videos like "U Can't Touch This" and "Too Legit To Quit" created a template of lavish performance values that many rap artists still follow today".

In March 2009, Ellen DeGeneres made plans for Hammer to be on her show (The Ellen DeGeneres Show) after he contacted her via Twitter. Hammer continued to give media interviews, such as being a guest on Chelsea Lately on June 16, 2009. There he discussed his relationship with Vanilla Ice, his stint on The Surreal Life, his show Hammertime, his family, his mansion, about him being in shape, his positive financial status and other "colorful topics" (subliminal jokes) regarding his baggy pants.

In 2010, Rick Ross released "MC Hammer" from the Teflon Don album which samples Hammer's "2 Legit 2 Quit". To celebrate Hammer's 50th birthday, San Francisco game maker Zynga offered up some recent player's Draw Something drawings from his fans. Other sources/services offered "props" on behalf of his special occasion and to show appreciation for his memorable persona/gimmicks used during the peak of his career.

In 2012, Slaughterhouse released a single called "Hammer Dance", along with a video. "Hammer Dance" was the lead single from the Welcome to: Our House album. During the 2013 Oakland Athletics season, the "2 Legit 2 Quit" music video played on the Diamond Vision in between innings, usually during the middle of the 8th inning. The video featured prominent players from the San Francisco Bay Area's sports championships, such as former A's players Jose Canseco and hall of fame inductee Rickey Henderson. Hammer appeared in a Cheetos commercial during the Super Bowl in 2020, the 30th anniversary of "U Can't Touch This".

In January 2024, a storage unit was sold at auction containing what the buyer of the storage unit reported as 30 master tapes containing at least 14 unreleased tracks recorded during Hammer's time at Death Row Records. The former Death Row Records producer of these tapes, Craig Williams, stated that he believes the tapes are authentic. It is unclear what will become of these songs or who legally owns these recordings.

== Influences and effect ==
Hammer's career in rap and entertainment has influenced and been influenced by such artists as: Kool Moe Dee; Big Daddy Kane; James Brown; Prince; Michael Jackson; Kurtis Blow; Earth, Wind & Fire; Rick James; Doug E. Fresh, who joined Hammer's Bust It Records label in 1992 and issued the album Doin' What I Gotta Do with the track "Bustin' Out (On Funk)" sampling the Rick James single "Bustin' Out"; Run-DMC; and Grandmaster Flash and the Furious Five. Hammer was followed by related musicians such as Will Smith, DC Talk, BB Jay, Diddy (aka "Puffy" or "Puff Daddy"), Young MC, B Angie B, M.C. Brains, MC Breed, Marky Mark and the Funky Bunch, C+C Music Factory, Mystikal, Bell Biv DeVoe, Kris Kross, Ho Frat Hoo!, and Oaktown's 357. Hammer also influenced the music industry with pop culture catchphrases and slang.

Some critics complained of a lack of originality in Hammer's early productions. Entertainment Weekly described "U Can't Touch This" as 'shamelessly copying its propulsive riff from Rick James ("Super Freak"). Hammer admits, "When I look at Puffy with a choir, I say, 'Sure that's a take-off of what I do." Notable feuds and beefs Hammer had with other rappers included: LL Cool J, Vanilla Ice, Too Short, Redman, 3rd Bass, Jay-Z, Eminem, A Tribe Called Quest, and Run-DMC. Several diss tracks were featured on his albums, including Let's Get It Started and The Funky Headhunter.

== Award recipient, appearances and recognition ==
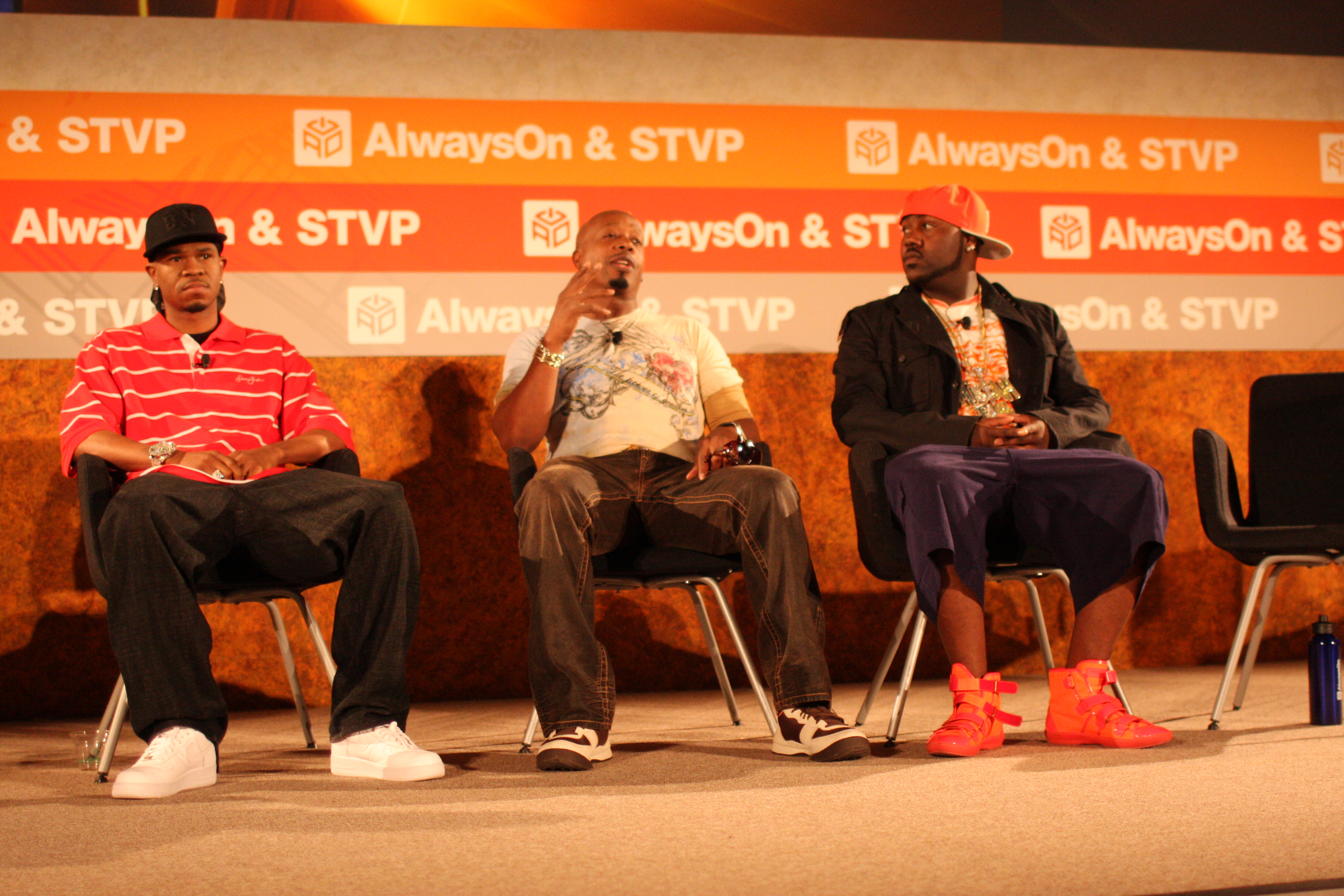
Hammer with Chamillionaire and Mistah F.A.B. at TechCrunch on July 24, 2008.

Throughout the years, Hammer has been awarded for his music, videos and choreography. He has sold more than 50 million records worldwide. He has won three Grammy Awards (one with Rick James and Alonzo Miller) for Best Rhythm and Blues Song (1990), Best Rap Solo (1990) and Best Music Video: Long Form (1990) taken from Please Hammer Don't Hurt 'Em: The Movie. He also received eight American Music Awards, a People's Choice Award, an NAACP Image Awards and the Billboard Diamond Award (the first for a hip hop artist).

The International Album of the Year validated Hammer's talent as a world-class entertainer. Additionally, Hammer was also honored with a Soul Train Music Award (Sammy Davis, Jr. Award for Entertainer of the Year) in 1991. He has also been a presenter/performer at Soul Train's Music Awards several times, including The 5th Annual Soul Train Music Awards (1991), The 9th Annual Soul Train Music Awards (1995) and Soul Train's 25th Anniversary (1995). Hammer appeared on gospel music's Stellar Awards show in 1997 and spoke of his renewed commitment to God. In the same interview, he promised to unveil the "second leg" of his career. During the 2005 MTV Video Music Awards, Hammer made a surprise appearance in the middle of the show with best friend Jermaine Jackson.

Hammer gave his support to Warren Beatty by attending the 36th AFI Life Achievement Awards on June 12, 2008. In August 2008, at the World Hip Hop Dance Championship, Hammer won a Living Legends of Hip Hop Award from Hip Hop International in Las Vegas.

Hammer, Gary Vaynerchuk, Shaquille O'Neal and Rick Sanchez (host) celebrated the Best of Twitter in Brooklyn at the first Shorty Awards on February 11, 2009, which honored the top short-form content creators on Twitter. In September 2009, Hammer made the "accomplishment appearance" in Zombie Apocalypse for the downloadable Smash TV/Left 4 Dead hybrid for the Xbox 360. Hammer attended the 2009 Soul Train Music Awards which aired on BET November 29, 2009.

Hammer (along with Alyssa Milano and others) was a member of panel judges for the Real-Time Academy of Short Form Arts & Sciences at the Second Annual Shorty Awards on January 5, 2010. Hammer opened the 2010 BET Hip Hop Awards performing "2 Legit 2 Quit" in Atlanta along with Rick Ross, Diddy and DJ Khaled (all performing together during "MC Hammer" from the Teflon Don album as well) on October 2 (televised October 12).

With over 2.6 million Twitter followers in 2010, his contribution to social media and as a co-founder of his own Internet businesses (such as DanceJam.com), Hammer was announced as the recipient of the first Gravity Summit Social Media Marketer of the Year Award. The award was presented to him at the 3rd Annual Gravity Summit on February 22, 2011, at the UCLA Covel Commons.

At the 40th American Music Awards in November 2012, Hammer danced to a mashup of "Gangnam Style" and "2 Legit 2 Quit" along with South Korean pop star Psy, both wearing his signature Hammer pants. The collaboration was released on iTunes. The performance idea with Hammer came from Psy's management. They both performed it together again during Dick Clark's New Year's Rockin' Eve on December 31, 2012.

Hammer received the George and Ira Gershwin Award for Lifetime Musical Achievement (not to be confused with the Gershwin Prize), presented during the UCLA Spring Sing in Pauley Pavilion on May 17, 2013.

== Tours and concerts ==
Notable tours and concerts include: A Spring Affair Tour (1989), Summer Jam '89 (1989), Please Hammer Don't Hurt 'Em World Tour (1990 & 1991), Lawlor Events Center at University of Nevada, Reno (1990–2017), Too Legit to Quit World Tour (1992), Red, White and Boom (2003), The Bamboozle Festival (2007), Hardly Strictly Bluegrass (2008–2013), McKay Events Center with Vanilla Ice (2009), Illinois State Fair with Boyz II Men (2011), MusicFest (2012), Jack's Seventh Show at Verizon Wireless Amphitheatre (2012), Kool & the Gang Superjam at Outside Lands (2014), Hammer's All-star House Party Tour (2019) and 80's Weekend #9 at Microsoft Theater (2020).

== Discography ==
- Feel My Power (1986)
- Let's Get It Started (1988)
- Please Hammer Don't Hurt 'Em (1990)
- Too Legit to Quit (1991)
- The Funky Headhunter (1994)
- Inside Out (1995)
- Family Affair (1998)
- Active Duty (2001)
- Full Blast (2004)
- Look Look Look (2006)
- DanceJamtheMusic (2009)
- The Chronicles of Big Hamm (2017)

== See also ==
- List of dancers
