= Greatest Hits (MC Hammer album) =

Greatest hits album by MC Hammer
- Released: October 1, 1996
- Recorded: 1988–1996
- Genre: Pop, hip hop
- Length: 56:22
- Label: EMI

MC Hammer chronology
Inside Out (1995)	Greatest Hits (1996)	Back 2 Back Hits (1998)

Professional ratings
Review scores
Source	Rating
AllMusic	4.5/5 stars

Greatest Hits is a pop album from American rapper MC Hammer in 1996 which features his most successful singles from his first four albums. There are currently two versions/covers of his "Greatest Hits" album, the other titled The Hits in 2000. It contains tracks from his first four albums, no tracks from the albums The Funky Headhunter and Inside Out are included. It received critical acclaim

== Track listing ==
1. "U Can't Touch This" - 4:17
2. "Too Legit to Quit" (featuring Saja) - 5:36
3. "Turn This Mutha Out" - 4:43
4. "Pray" - 5:13
5. "Addams Groove" - 3:59
6. "Do Not Pass Me By" (featuring Tramaine Williams, Trina Johnson & The Voices) - 5:30
7. "Here Comes the Hammer" - 4:32
8. "Have You Seen Her" - 4:42
9. "Let's Get It Started" - 4:08
10. "Gaining Momentum" (featuring Saja) - 5:40
11. "Pump It Up (Here's the News)" - 4:34
12. "They Put Me in the Mix" - 3:28
