= B Angie B =

American singer (born 1968)

- Born: Angela Roxanna Boyd; September 21, 1968 (age 57); Morton, Mississippi, United States
- Genres: R&B; pop; dance
- Occupations: Singer; dancer
- Instruments: Vocals
- Years active: 1990–present
- Labels: Capitol; EMI; Monarchy; Humble Sound Records

Angela Roxanna Boyd (born March 9, 1968), known by the stage name B Angie B, is an American R&B singer and dancer. Originally a backup vocalist for MC Hammer, she rose to prominence with the release of her debut self-titled album in April 1991 on Bust It Records. The album spawned two US Top 5 R&B singles: "I Don't Want to Lose Your Love" (debuted at No. 11) and "So Much Love".

== Early life and education ==
Angela Roxanne Boyd was born in Morton, Mississippi, on September 21, 1968. She grew up singing and honing her vocals in a local church. She graduated from Morton High School in the Scott County School District in 1984. Shortly after graduation, she relocated to Oakland, California, to pursue a music career.

== Career ==
In 1988, Boyd was featured on MC Hammer's songs "They Put Me in the Mix" and "Pump It Up (Here's the News)" for his second album Let's Get It Started on Capitol Records. She formed a short-lived group called Ace Juice with Ace Roberson and Brittan "Pure Juice" Sneed. The group released their self-titled debut album Ace Juice in June 1989. In the same year, she was featured on Oaktown's 357's song "Juicy Gotcha Krazy" for their album Wild & Loose. She returned to performing background vocals for MC Hammer on his album Please Hammer Don't Hurt 'Em (1990). In June 1990, she toured again as one of his background vocalists for the Please Hammer Don't Hurt 'Em World Tour. During the tour, she adopted the stage name B Angie B, which stands for "Beautiful Angie Boyd". However, Hammer is credited with telling her to "just be Angie".

After Hammer signed One Cause One Effect, "Midnite Lover" (featuring B Angie B) peaked at No. 58 on the US Hot R&B Singles chart (11 weeks) from their album Drop the Axxe (1990), which peaked at No. 51 on the US Top R&B/Hip-Hop Albums chart.

In early 1991, B Angie B signed to MC Hammer's record label Bust It Records, distributed by Capitol Records. She released her debut self-titled album B Angie B in April 1991. The album peaked at No. 133 on the US Billboard 200 and No. 12 on the US Top R&B Albums chart, selling over 137,000 copies worldwide. The album's lead single "I Don't Want To Lose Your Love", a cover version of The Emotions' 1976 song, peaked at No. 54 on the Billboard Hot 100 and No. 2 on the US Hot R&B Singles chart. Her second single "So Much Love" peaked at No. 3 on the US Hot R&B Singles chart. The album's final single "Sweet Thang", a cover of Rufus's 1975 song, peaked at No. 52 on the Hot R&B Singles chart. She later toured as the opening act for Johnny Gill's tour in 1991.

In June 1992, she appeared in the comedy film Class Act. She recorded a song for the film's soundtrack called "A Class Act". She recorded a second album due to be released in September 1992, but it was shelved after she was released from Bust It Records in October 1992, because MC Hammer was disappointed with the low sales of B Angie B – along with other Bust It Records music acts Special Generation, Oaktown's 357, and One Cause One Effect.

In 1995, she released a single called "It's My Life", written by Kelly Price. The single peaked at No. 74 on the Hot R&B Singles chart. In 2000, she left the music industry and became a real estate agent.

In May 2012, B Angie B released a single called "I Wanna Be". In 2013, she signed a recording contract with Monarchy Records, a division of the Spectra Music Group. In September 2014, she released another single called "Love". In March 2016, she released a single called "Shake". She released her second album Stronger Than Ever on April 22, 2016. In 2024, she signed with label Humble Sound Records in partnership with James Artissen to release new music.

== Personal life ==
Boyd was married to music producer James Earley and had a daughter together. In July 1991, while married to Earley, she began dating Mike Tyson. She was a witness at Tyson's 1992 rape trial and eventually divorced Earley amicably.

== Discography ==
=== Albums ===
List of studio albums, with selected chart positions
Title	Album details	Peak chart positions	
Title	Album details	US	US R&B
B Angie B	Released: April 1, 1991; Label: Bust It Records, Capitol Records; Formats: CD, cassette, LP	133	12
Stronger Than Ever	Released: April 22, 2016; Label: Monarchy Records; Formats: Digital download, streaming	—	—

=== Singles ===
List of singles as lead artist, with selected chart positions and certifications, showing year released and album name
Title	Year	Peak chart positions		Album
Title	Year	US	US R&B	Album
"I Don't Want To Lose Your Love"	1991	54	2	B Angie B
"So Much Love"	1991	—	3	B Angie B
"Sweet Thang"	1991	—	52	B Angie B
"It's My Life"	1995	—	74	Non-album single
"I Wanna Be"	2012	—	—	Stronger Than Ever
"Love"	2014	—	—	Stronger Than Ever
"Shake"	2016	—	—	Non-album single
"It's You"	2024	—	—	Non-album single
