= Hammer pants =

Baggy pants with sagging rise and tapered ankle

Jacket and "Hammer pants" worn by MC Hammer in the 1988 video for "They Put Me in the Mix"

Hammer pants are modified baggy pants, tapered at the ankle with a sagging rise, made suitable for hip hop dancing. It is considered a style of harem pants. They were popularized in the 1980s and 1990s by American rapper MC Hammer. They are often colloquially referred to as parachute pants (a term which can also refer to a specific style of nylon trousers), although MC Hammer stated in an interview in 2016 that he preferred to use the term Hammer pants.

Hammer's specialized clothing line came in a variety of colors and were usually shiny and flashy-styled, as often seen throughout his hip-hop career during talk show appearances, live concerts and music videos (including "U Can't Touch This" and "Pray"). The customized pants appeared again on Hammertime, his 2009 TV reality show.

In 2022, Bobby Brown claimed he started wearing the "diaper pants" that Hammer altered and made famous, on his A&E show Bobby Brown: Every Little Step. However, Brown wore a less sagging variation during some concerts and in music videos, such as "My Prerogative" (1988) and "Every Little Step" (1989).
