= The Hits (MC Hammer album) =

Greatest hits album by M.C. Hammer
- Released: 2000
- Genre: Rap, hip-hop
- Producer: M.C. Hammer

M.C. Hammer chronology
Back 2 Back Hits (1998)	The Hits (2000)	Active Duty (2001)

The Hits is a 2000 compilation album by rapper M.C. Hammer. It contains tracks from his first four albums.

== Track listing ==
1. "U Can't Touch This"
2. "Addams Groove"
3. "Too Legit to Quit"
4. "This Is the Way We Roll"
5. "Pray"
6. "Turn This Mutha Out"
7. "Gaining Momentum"
8. "Do Not Pass Me By"
9. "Let's Get It Started"
10. "They Put Me In the Mix"
11. "Black Is Black"
12. "Help the Children"
13. "Pump It Up (Here's the NEWS)"
14. "Have You Seen Her"
15. "U Can't Touch This (Club Version)"
16. "Feel My Power"
17. "Yo!! Sweetness"
