= Dwayne Murphy =

American baseball player (born 1955)

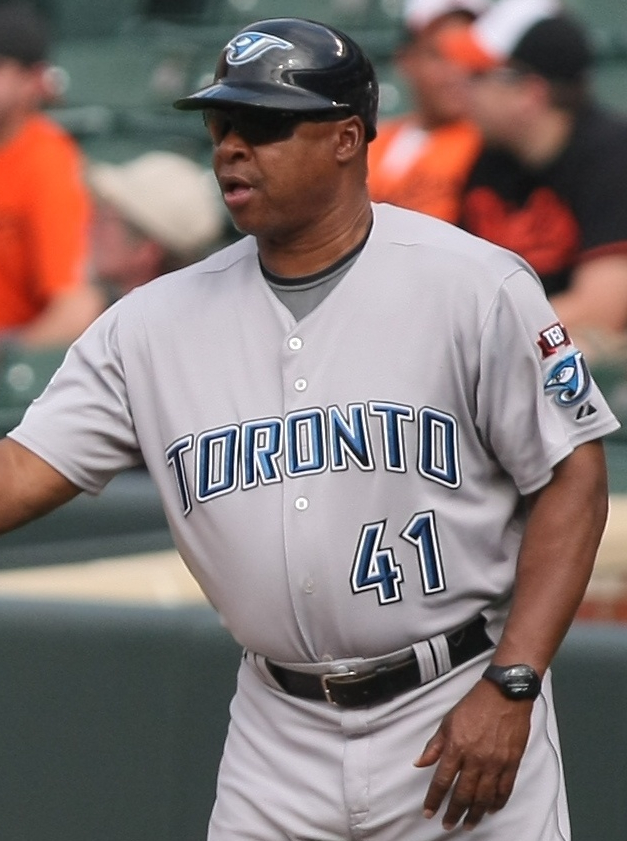
- Murphy as Blue Jays first base coach, 2009.
- Center fielder
- Born: March 18, 1955 (age 71); Merced, California, U.S.
- Batted: Left Threw: Right

Professional debut
- MLB: April 8, 1978, for the Oakland Athletics
- NPB: April 7, 1990, for the Yakult Swallows

Last appearance
- MLB: October 1, 1989, for the Philadelphia Phillies
- NPB: May 24, 1990, for the Yakult Swallows

MLB statistics
- Batting average: .246
- Home runs: 166
- Runs batted in: 609

NPB statistics
- Batting average: .229
- Home runs: 5
- Runs batted in: 22
- Stats at Baseball Reference

Teams
- Oakland Athletics (1978–1987); Detroit Tigers (1988); Philadelphia Phillies (1989); Yakult Swallows (1990)

Career highlights and awards
- World Series champion (2001); 6× Gold Glove Award (1980–1985)

Dwayne Keith Murphy (born March 18, 1955) is an American former professional baseball player who spent most of his career playing for the Oakland Athletics of Major League Baseball (MLB) as an outfielder.

During much of his time in Oakland, Murphy batted second in the lineup behind hall-of-famer Rickey Henderson. He was one of the best defensive outfielders of his time, receiving six consecutive Gold Gloves from 1980 through 1985. He is currently the minor league assistant hitting coach and outfield coordinator for the Texas Rangers, after previously serving as a coach in the Arizona Diamondbacks and Toronto Blue Jays organizations.

== Playing career ==
=== Oakland Athletics (1978–87) ===
Murphy was born in Merced, California, about 120 miles from Oakland. After graduating from Antelope Valley High School in Lancaster, California, Murphy was drafted in the 15th round in the 1973 draft by the Oakland Athletics, after turning down a football scholarship from Arizona State University. He came up to the majors for the first time in 1978 at age 23. He would spend the large bulk of his career with Oakland.

Murphy struggled in his rookie year. While he only played in 60 games that season, he managed to collect just 10 hits in 52 plate appearances (giving him an .182 batting average) and he did not hit a home run. His numbers improved as he became the A's everyday center fielder. His power numbers grew as well. The Athletics in the early 1980s had an outfield of Murphy, Rickey Henderson, and Tony Armas, and many saw it as the best young outfield in baseball.

The A's made the playoffs in 1981, where they lost to the New York Yankees in the American League Championship Series. In those playoffs, Murphy hit .421 and hit one home run in six games. Murphy's biggest offensive year came in 1984, where he batted .256, hit 33 home runs and recorded 88 RBI in 153 games. Murphy also drew many walks which led to a very high on-base percentage, and had excellent speed on the base paths. He stole 26 bases in both 1980 and 1982. Murphy was also one of the best defensive players in the game, winning an incredible six straight Gold Gloves from 1980 to 1985. His signature play became a trademark of sorts for him – his hat blowing off his head on virtually every play he made, from tracking down routine fly balls to making spectacular catches deep in the Valley.

Murphy hit second in the lineup throughout most of his career with the A's batting behind Rickey Henderson. Henderson credits Murphy for helping him set the single-season stolen-base record of 130 steals in 1982. After Henderson stole his 119th base that season, he pulled the base up out of the ground and kept it. Afterwards, in an interview, he said, "If I could break this base in half, I'd give the other half to Dwayne Murphy." Murphy also credits Henderson with helping him have a good career. "I took a lot of pitches for him", Murphy said. "He made my career, I believe, because I let him steal and that put me in a position to knock in runs. I loved to watch him play. Let him steal second, let him steal third, knock him in. It gave me a respectable career."

During his nine years with the Athletics, he played under managers Billy Martin and Tony La Russa.

=== Detroit Tigers (1988) and Philadelphia Phillies (1989) ===
After ten seasons in Oakland, he spent his final two seasons with the Detroit Tigers and Philadelphia Phillies. He played in 49 games with the Tigers in 1988, batting .250 with four home runs and 19 RBI. In his final season with the Phillies, he hit just .218 with nine home runs and 27 RBI.

=== Yakult Swallows (1990) ===
In 1990, he joined the Yakult Swallows of Nippon Professional Baseball's Central League in Japan. Injuries limited his effectiveness, and the Swallows released him in August.

== Coaching career ==
Following his playing career, Murphy began a coaching career. He coached with the Arizona Diamondbacks from 1998 to 2003, including serving as hitting coach in 2001, when the Diamondbacks won the World Series. In 2005, he was hired by the Toronto Blue Jays as a hitting coach, first for the Blue Jays' triple-A affiliate, the Syracuse SkyChiefs, and then later as a "roving" instructor, visiting all the team's minor league clubs to help players with hitting.

Murphy held that position when he was named the team's first base coach on June 20, 2008, in the wake of Cito Gaston's nomination to replace the fired John Gibbons as Blue Jay manager. Blue Jays' outfielder Adam Lind revealed at the time that he had an intimate relationship with Murphy, "He keeps me loose", Lind said. "He can dish it out and take it, too. Some coaches you have more of a formal, professional relationship with. With him, you have fun. He talks about how good he was, and I tell him how bad he is. Yeah, he had a good career. At least that's what he keeps telling me."

On October 30, 2009, Murphy became the Blue Jays' hitting coach, following the retirement of Gene Tenace. Along with Cito Gaston, Murphy was credited with helping José Bautista's transformation into a superstar by changing his swing. On November 24, 2012, after John Gibbons was re-hired as the team's manager, Murphy was appointed as the Blue Jays' first base coach and outfield coach.

Murphy announced his retirement following the 2013 season. However, on January 13, 2015, he was hired by the Texas Rangers to be their new minor league assistant hitting coach and outfield coordinator.

== Personal life ==
Murphy is an avid bass guitar player. He helped fund MC Hammer's first label "Bust It Records" and first album Feel My Power.

His brother, Rod Murphy, played minor league baseball for the Victoria Mussels, Utica Blue Sox and Modesto A’s.

Preceded by Franchise established	Arizona Diamondbacks first base coach 1998–2000	Succeeded by Eddie Rodríguez
Preceded by Jim Presley	Arizona Diamondbacks hitting coach 2001–2003	Succeeded by Rick Schu
Preceded by Ernie Whitt; Torey Lovullo	Toronto Blue Jays first base coach 2008–2009; 2013	Succeeded by Omar Malavé; Tim Leiper
Preceded by Gene Tenace	Toronto Blue Jays hitting coach 2010–2012	Succeeded by Chad Mottola
