= Inside Out (MC Hammer album) =

Studio album by MC Hammer
- Released: September 12, 1995
- Recorded: 1995
- Studios: RWI Studios (Fremont, California); Larrabee Sound Studios (Los Angeles, California)
- Genres: Christian hip hop; gospel; G-funk
- Length: 65:12
- Labels: Giant; Warner Bros. Records

MC Hammer chronology
The Funky Headhunter (1994)	Inside Out (1995)	Greatest Hits (1996)

Singles from Inside Out
- 1. "Sultry Funk" Released: September 3, 1995; 2. "Keep On" Released: November 27, 1995; 3. "Goin' Up Yonder" Released: December 15, 1995

Inside Out is the sixth studio album by American rapper MC Hammer (fifth excluding his independent debut). It was released via Giant Records and Reprise Records on September 12, 1995. After the slight decrease in popularity and sales of his previous album, The Funky Headhunter (which was certified platinum as opposed to multi-platinum like his older albums), Hammer returned to his previous pop rap image.

Inside Out featured emotionally-driven gospel dance tracks. The album spawned two singles: "Sultry Funk" and "Goin' Up Yonder". "Nothing But Love (A Song for Eazy)" was dedicated to Eazy-E, who had died in 1995. In contrast to his prior albums, the singles did not go as far as previous releases.

The album peaked at number 23 on the Billboard Top R&B/Hip-Hop Albums chart, but only reached number 119 on the Billboard 200, causing Giant Records to drop Hammer and his Oaktown Records subsidiary from the label. The album received positive reviews.

== Critical reception ==
Professional ratings
Review scores
Source	Rating
AllMusic	2/5 stars
Entertainment Weekly	B
RapReviews	7/10

AllMusic's Stephen Thomas Erlewine felt that Hammer was "unsure of himself throughout the album, attempting to gain some street credibility and a mass audience simultaneously." He concluded that, "[T]he result is a record that has a few good isolated moments, but never delivers a knockout punch, let alone a memorable hook or groove."

Tom Sinclair from Entertainment Weekly said that, "Even if nothing here touches "U Can't Touch This," the material is well crafted enough to convince you "Hammer Time" hasn't run out yet."

In a 2023 retrospective review, Steve 'Flash' Juon of RapReviews praised Hammer for continuing the "musical direction" he followed on The Funky Headhunter while adding thoughtful lyrics with subtle religious tones, concluding that: "It makes me suspect that I'm being contrarian on purpose and liking this record because people had already written Stanley Burrell off as a joke, but he's not ashamed to say he loves the Lord so I'm not ashamed to say I enjoyed his album. Give this one another chance."

== Track listing ==
No.	Title	Writer(s)	Producer(s)	Length
1.	"Luv-N-Happiness"	Al Green; MC Hammer; Mabon Hodges; Charles Torrell	Torrell; MC Hammer	4:53
2.	"Sultry Funk" (featuring VMF)	Larry Blackmon; Kevin Kendrick; Tommy Jenkins; Nathan Leftnant; MC Hammer; Steven L. White	White; MC Hammer	4:59
3.	"Anything Goes on the Dance Floor"	Aammen; MC Hammer; Felton Pilate	MC Hammer; Pilate	5:42
4.	"I Hope Things Change" (featuring Andre Williams)	MC Hammer; Pilate	MC Hammer; Pilate	5:01
5.	"Keep On" (featuring Angel Burgess)	Angel Burgess; MC Hammer; Luther Vandross; The Whole 9	MC Hammer; The Whole 9	5:16
6.	"Everything Is Alright"	MC Hammer; Torrell	Torrell; MC Hammer	3:49
7.	"I Need That Number"	Gerald Baillergeau; MC Hammer	Baillergeau; MC Hammer	5:05
8.	"Bustin' Loose"	Charles Brown; MC Hammer; The Whole 9	MC Hammer; The Whole 9	4:54
9.	"Nothing But Love (A Song for Eazy)"	MC Hammer; Ben Ross	Ross; MC Hammer	5:49
10.	"Goin' Up Yonder" (featuring Angel Burgess and the San Jose Community Choir)	Walter Hawkins; MC Hammer	Torrell; MC Hammer	7:30
11.	"He Keeps Doing Great Things for Me" (featuring Tynetta Hare and the San Jose Community Choir)	Eddie Robinson; MC Hammer	Torrell; MC Hammer	6:40
12.	"A Brighter Day"	MC Hammer; Pilate	MC Hammer; Pilate	5:34

== Samples ==
- "Luv-N-Happiness"
  - "Devotion" (Live) by Earth, Wind & Fire
- "Sultry Funk"
  - "Bop Gun (Endangered Species)" and "Give Up the Funk (Tear the Roof off the Sucker)" by Parliament
  - "How I Could Just Kill a Man" by Cypress Hill
- "Anything Goes on the Dance Floor"
  - "Darkest Light" by Lafayette Afro Rock Band
- "Keep On"
  - "Never Too Much" by Luther Vandross
- "Bustin' Loose"
  - "Bustin' Loose" by Chuck Brown & the Soul Searchers
- "A Brighter Day"
  - "If You Want Me to Stay" by Sly and the Family Stone

== Personnel ==
Adapted from the liner notes of Inside Out.

- The High Street Bank Boys – background vocals (tracks 6, 8)
- Todd Brown – background vocals (tracks 8, 9), mixing, vocal arrangements (track 9)
- Ben Ross – background vocals, synthesizers, drum programming (track 9)
- D-Style – guitar (track 9)
- Ontario Hayes – piano (tracks 10, 11), additional organ (track 11)
- Mike "Nite" Hersh – engineering (tracks 1, 2, 5–9)
- Brian Mayfield – engineering (tracks 5, 6, 9), assistant engineering (tracks 1–4, 8, 12)
- Dave Baker – engineering (tracks 10, 11)
- John Rhone – engineering (tracks 10, 11)
- Matt Campagna – assistant engineering (tracks 10, 11)
- LindaEar Music (Fremont, CA) – clearance assistance
- Victor Hall – art direction, logo design
- Mel Peters – cover photography
