= Back 2 Back Hits =

Greatest hits album by M.C. Hammer and Vanilla Ice
- Released: April 10, 1998; January 24, 2006
- Recorded: 1989–1994
- Genre: Hip hop
- Label: Capitol

M.C. Hammer chronology
Greatest Hits (1996)	Back 2 Back Hits (1998)	The Hits (2000)

Vanilla Ice chronology
Mind Blowin' (1994)	Back 2 Back Hits (1998)	Hard to Swallow (1998)

Professional ratings
Review scores
Source	Rating
AllMusic	3/5 stars

Back 2 Back Hits is a compilation album by American rappers M.C. Hammer and Vanilla Ice. The album was released in 1998 for CEMA Special Markets and was re-released in 2006 for Capitol Records. The first five songs on the album are by M.C. Hammer; the last five are by Vanilla Ice. The 2006 release replaced "Pray" with "Help the Children."

== Track listing ==
1. "U Can't Touch This" - 4:16
2. "Addams Groove" - 3:58
3. "Too Legit to Quit" - 5:05
4. "Pray" - 5:14
5. "Have You Seen Her" - 4:43
6. "Ice Ice Baby" - 4:31
7. "Cool as Ice (Everybody Get Loose)" - 5:32
8. "I Love You" (Live) - 5:57
9. "Play That Funky Music" (Live) - 5:00
10. "Dancin'" - 5:00
