= Geoffrey Arone =

American blockchain investor and advisor

- Education: Brown University (Sc.B., Neural Science); MIT Sloan School of Management (MBA)
- Occupations: Entrepreneur; Blockchain investor; Technology executive
- Years active: 2004–present
- Known for: Co-founder of Flock; Co-founder of SafetyWeb; Partner at Arrington XRP Capital

Geoffrey Arone is an American blockchain investor and advisor.

== Career ==
Before entering the blockchain sector, Arone held senior product roles at technology companies such as Oracle and RealNetworks. He is currently a partner at Arrington XRP Capital, a hedge fund focused on crypto assets and blockchain tech. He has invested in more than 50 cryptocurrency companies since 2017. Previously, he was Chief Product Officer at Whitepages. Prior to that, he was Chief Scientist of Experian, which acquired SafetyWeb in May 2011. Arone co-founded SafetyWeb in June 2009 and raised ~ $8 million from Battery Ventures and First Round Capital. SafetyWeb is a cloud-based personal security company whose products include SafetyWeb Family and myID.

Prior to SafetyWeb, Arone was the CEO and co-founder of DanceJam with MC Hammer and Anthony Young. While running DanceJam, Arone raised two rounds of venture capital and sold the company to Grind Networks in 2009.

In late 2004, Arone co-founded Flock, the first web browser with social network integration, with Bart Decrem and Anthony Young. In all, Flock raised ~ $28 million from Bessemer Venture Partners, Shasta Ventures, and Fidelity Ventures. Nearly 6 years and 14 million downloads later, Flock was acquired by Zynga.

== Education ==
Arone has also held product positions at RealNetworks, Informatica, and Oracle. He holds a Sc.B. in Neural Science from Brown University and his PhD work was also in Neural Science. He earned an MBA from the MIT Sloan School of Management.

== Experian and Whitepages ==
After Experian acquired SafetyWeb, Arone became Senior Vice President of Product Innovation and Chief Scientist at Experian, where he was responsible for identifying and developing new products globally. In February 2015 he joined Whitepages, the Seattle-based contact-information company, as Executive Vice President of Products. Whitepages founder and CEO Alex Algard said the company needed his vision as the concept of digital identity evolved, and cited his knowledge of the social web.
