= David Schulhof =

- Born: David Kenneth Schulhof; New York City, U.S.
- Education: Georgetown University; New York University
- Occupations: Music industry executive, investor
- Website: http://davidschulhof.com

David Kenneth Schulhof is an American music industry executive and investor. He is the founder and chief executive officer of the MUSQ Global Music Industry ETF, an exchange-traded fund focused on companies involved in the music industry. Schulhof was president of music publishing at LiveOne and president of music at AGC Studios and IM Global Studios. He is also the co-founder and former chief executive officer of Evergreen Copyright Acquisitions and is a member of the New York State Bar.

== Early life and education ==
Schulhof was born and raised in New York City. His father, Michael Schulhof, was a businessman who was chief executive officer of Sony Corporation of America in the 1990s. His mother worked as an antiquarian.

Schulhof graduated from Georgetown University and later received a Juris Doctor from New York University. He is a member of the New York State Bar.

== Career ==
Schulhof began his career in business affairs and later moved into the music industry. He worked for Dimension Films and Miramax.

In 1999 he became vice president of motion picture music and legal affairs at Miramax. During this period he was executive producer on more than one hundred film soundtracks.

In 2006 Schulhof, together with music executives Joel Katz and Richard Perna, founded the music publishing company EverGreen Copyright Acquisitions. The company began by acquiring several music catalogs, including Rykomusic. Schulhof and Perna were co-chief executive officers, with Schulhof overseeing film, television, advertising, and creative affairs.

The company later acquired the music catalog of MC Hammer and the copyright administration company Integrated Copyright Group. EverGreen also acquired the writer’s share of Tupac Shakur's publishing catalog and entered into a licensing agreement involving the catalog of Death Row Records.

EverGreen was acquired by BMG Rights Management in 2010, at which time it controlled approximately 65,000 copyrights.

After the sale of EverGreen, Schulhof became managing director of media business at G2, a private equity affiliate of Guggenheim Partners.

In 2014 Schulhof formed a joint venture with IM Global, a subsidiary of the Reliance Group. He was president and partner of IM Global Music, overseeing music for the company’s film and television projects.

In 2015 he brokered a multi-picture agreement with Republic Records to develop music-driven feature films.

In 2017 Schulhof was executive producer of the music documentary Clive Davis: The Soundtrack of Our Lives, which premiered as the opening film of the Tribeca Film Festival and was later released by Apple Music.

In 2018 Schulhof joined AGC Studios as head of music, overseeing music-driven film and television projects as well as the studio's music publishing operations.

In 2023 Schulhof launched the MUSQ Global Music Industry ETF, an exchange-traded fund designed to provide investors exposure to companies operating across the music industry, including record labels, streaming platforms, concert promoters, and technology companies.

== Personal life ==
Schulhof married Lesley Gurkin in 2007. They have a daughter and live on the Upper East Side of Manhattan.

== Filmography ==
Year	Title	Function
2000	The Yards	Executive in charge of music
2000	Bounce	Executive music supervisor
2000	Highlander: Endgame	Music supervisor
2001	Spy Kids	Executive in charge of music
2001	Serendipity	Executive in charge of music
2001	On the Line	Music executive
2001	O	Associate producer
2001	Get Over It	Executive music supervisor
2001	Chocolat	Executive in charge of music
2001	Bridget Jones's Diary	Executive in charge of music
2001	Amélie	Executive in charge of music
2001	Jay and Silent Bob Strike Back	Music supervisor
2001	Impostor	Music supervisor
2002	Undisputed	Music supervisor
2002	Paid in Full	Music supervisor
2002	The Shipping News	Executive in charge of music
2002	Kate & Leopold	Executive in charge of music
2002	Iris	Music executive
2002	Frida	Music supervisor
2015	Secret in Their Eyes	Music supervisor
2016	Southside with You	Music supervisor
2016	Fifty Shades of Black	Music supervisor
2016	Collide	Executive producer (music)
2016	The Journey	Music supervisor
2017	Clive Davis: The Soundtrack of Our Lives	Executive producer
2018	Muscle Shoals	Executive producer
