= I Married... =

- Genre: Reality
- Directed by: Barbara Kopple
- Country of origin: United States
- Original language: English
- No. of seasons: 1
- No. of episodes: 7

Production
- Executive producers: Kate Hillis; Laurie Meadoff
- Producers: David Cassidy; Claude Davies
- Running time: 30 minutes

Original release
- Network: VH1
- Release: November 12, 2003 – February 25, 2005

I Married... is an American reality television series that aired on VH1. The series aired sporadically for seven episodes between 2003 and 2005.

== Overview ==
I Married... chronicles various celebrity marriages and the ups and downs fame created for the couples. Couples featured in the program include:

- Rapper MC Hammer and his wife Stephanie
- Singer Darius Rucker and his wife Beth
- Former Apprentice contestant Omarosa Manigault-Stallworth and her husband Aaron
- Singer Carnie Wilson and her husband Rob
- Singer Sebastian Bach and his wife/manager Maria
- Musician Uncle Kracker and his wife Melanie
- Singer Sammy Hagar and his wife Kari
