= Felton Pilate =

American singer and songwriter (born 1952)

Felton C. Pilate II (born November 5, 1952) is an American singer, songwriter, multi-instrumentalist and record producer. He is best known as a member of the 1970s and 1980s funk-R&B band Con Funk Shun. Pilate is also notable for the songs and albums he produced with MC Hammer.

== Early life and music career ==
Pilate was born in Jackson, Mississippi (United States). His father, Felton Pilate Sr., was a naval physician. His mother, Benita Akines Pilate, was a music major and social worker. After many military assignments, the Pilate family’s last move would be a move to Vallejo, California. Felton Jr. would spend his formative years there. Pilate knew from a young age that music would be an important part of his life. He took trumpet and piano lessons, and self taught himself to play guitar and the trombone. In high school, he created a band and performed locally, while honing his craft.

Michael Cooper, who had another local band, asked Pilate to join his band during their final high school years. This was the beginning of his career as a member of Project Soul. The band went on the road with The Soul Children and moved to Memphis, Tennessee. There they got a record deal and were asked to change their name from Project Soul. The band chose the name Con Funk Shun. The band went on to record a string of hit records, in the 1970s and 1980s. Pilate was co-record producer and songwriter, for his own group's albums and singles. He continued to perform with Con Funk Shun in later years. Pilate proclaimed the music industry has been his only income since 1972.

As a collaborator with rapper MC Hammer, Pilate's joint efforts with Hammer have sold over 30 million albums, between 1986 and 1995. Albums included: Feel My Power (1986), Let's Get It Started (1988), Please Hammer Don't Hurt 'Em (1990), Too Legit to Quit (1991) and Inside Out (1995).

== Discography ==
- Nothing But Love Spoken Here via New Media Studio (2006)
- Can't Get E'nuff (1987)
- Cleopatra (1987)
