= Hammertime =

- Title card
- Genre: Reality
- Directed by: Kenny Hull
- Opening theme: "The Hammer Family" by M.C. Hammer
- Country of origin: United States
- Original language: English
- No. of seasons: 1
- No. of episodes: 11

Production
- Running time: 20-22 minutes

Original release
- Network: A&E Network
- Release: June 14 – July 26, 2009

Hammertime is a 2009 American reality television series that chronicles the daily life of rapper MC Hammer. The show debuted June 14, 2009 on the A&E Network and was produced by 3Ball Productions. The title is derived from a lyric in Hammer's 1990 hit single "U Can't Touch This" ("Stop! Hammer time!").

The show features Hammer and his family — his wife Stephanie; their children Bobby, Jeremiah, Sammy, Sarah, Stanley Jr., and A'keiba; his nephew Jamaris and cousin Marvin "Bigg Marv" Grant—living in their large ranch-style house in Tracy, California. The series premiere averaged a middling 1.123 million viewers, placing it outside A&E's top fifteen shows for the week. The show was canceled after just one season and eleven episodes.

Reviews were mixed to negative. The New York Times wrote, "Like Snoop Dogg's Father Hood or Run's House, Hammertime goes into race-politics overload to prove that black rappers can be top-grade family men ascribing to yuppie values." According to Richard Huff of the New York Daily News, the show was "inoffensive, but it's also emotionless ... [and] leaves viewers feeling like they've wasted their time." Brian Lowry of Variety wrote, "Hammertime continues the trend ... of celebrities demonstrating how their lives are as boring as everybody else’s."

On July 30, 2009, Grant was arrested after being accused of rape by a woman he had met online. The charges were dropped in 2010.

== Episodes ==
1. Shaping Up
2. Daddy Daycare
3. On the Road Again
4. That's a Bet!
5. Moving Forward
6. Vegas Baby!
7. Home Cookin
8. Lost Episode
9. Giving Back
10. Family Vacation
11. Love Is in the Air
