= Showmanship (performing) =

Artistic performance appealing to an audience

Showmanship, concerning artistic performing such as in Theatre, is the skill of performing in such a manner that will appeal to an audience or aid in conveying the performance's essential theme or message.

For instance, the Canadian stage magician Doug Henning used many classic illusions in his magic show. However, he made the old material seem new by rejecting the old stylistic cliches of the art (such as wearing formal wear), and by presenting them with a childlike exuberance that respected the audience's intelligence.

Profitable showmanship frequently appeals to pathos. Showmen aim to display goods with tact in order to sell an object or a show.
