= Ethos Magazine =

University of Oregon student publication

- Editor in Chief: Anna Mattson
- Categories: Student publication
- Founded: 2005
- First issue: January 2006
- Country: United States
- Based in: Eugene, Oregon
- Language: English
- Website: www.ethosmagonline.com

Ethos Magazine is a student publication produced at the University of Oregon in Eugene, Oregon, United States. Originally Korean Ducks magazine (after the school sports team name), which focused on Korean culture, it has since developed a multicultural spirit to serve readers throughout the University of Oregon community. The publication got its name from the word "ethos", the fundamental characteristic of a spirit, people or culture.

== History ==
The magazine was founded in 2005. In January 2006, the first issue of Ethos was released under the name Korean Ducks by Co-Directors and University students Toung Cha and Hasang Cheon. The publication was started to help spread knowledge about Korean culture, on and off campus.

In the fall of 2007, the magazine was re-branded as KD. The mission of the publication evolved to help spread a variety of cultures.

In the spring of 2009, the magazine turned to its most recent name, Ethos Magazine.

Ethos has maintained independence from the University of Oregon and its journalism school. The editorial agenda is fully controlled by the student staff.

In January, 2015, Ethos's series on sex trafficking in Oregon was named "Our College Pick" by Longreads

== Content ==
Features include multicultural stories ranging from Eugene restaurants to international human rights debates.

Ethos is published quarterly and explores international, national and local cultural stories. As an official student group, the publication receives support and funding from the Associated Students of the University of Oregon, though the majority of its income comes from advertising, fundraising events, donations and other support from the non-profit organization Generation Progress.

== Awards ==
In 2013, 2014 and 2015 Ethos was awarded an ACP Pacemaker Award, the top honor from the Associated Collegiate Press, which is widely considered to be the unofficial Pulitzer Prize of collegiate journalism. Its 2015 Pacemaker Award was for the online magazine category, and it was a finalist in the print magazine category. Ethos has also received awards from the Society of Professional Journalists and the Columbia School of Journalism.

== Events ==
Every term, the magazine holds promotional events, and works with local businesses. Events include raffles, multimedia contests, and providing study snacks during midterms and finals.
