= Special Generation (band) =

American contemporary R&B group

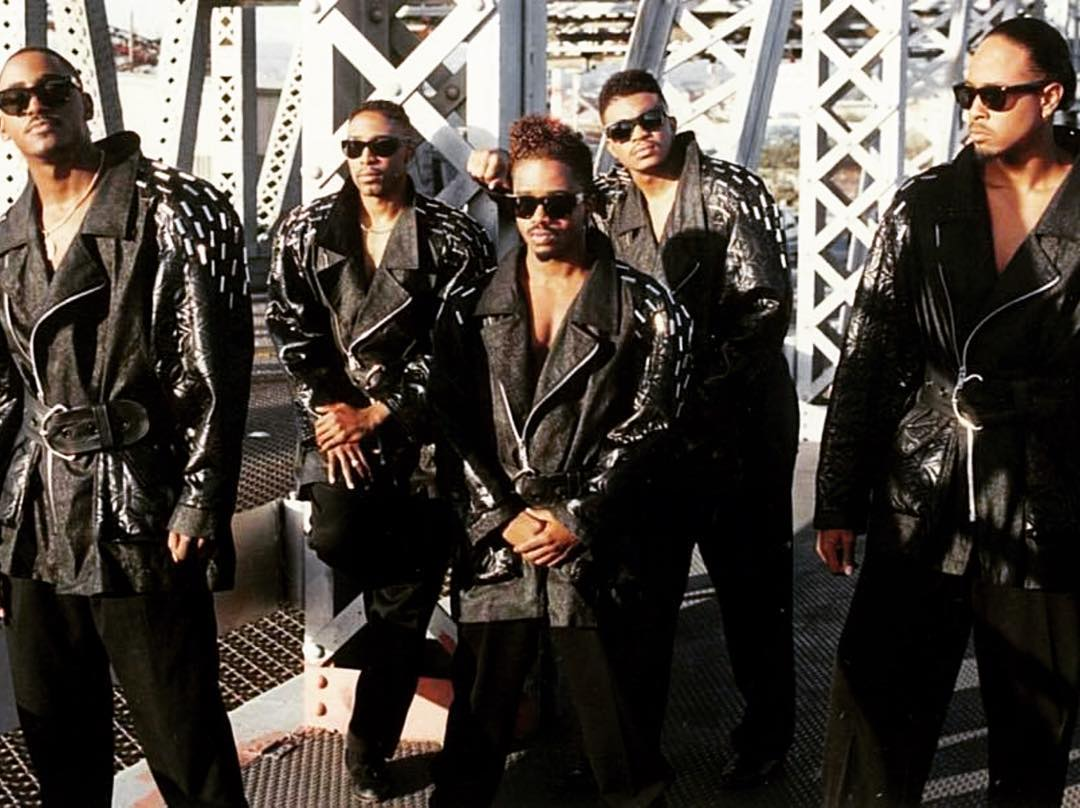

Background information
- Origin: St. Petersburg, Florida
- Genres: R&B, new jack swing
- Years active: 1988–present
- Labels: Bust It Records, Capitol
- Members: Maquet Robinson; Kendrick Washington; Fernando Carter; Charles Salter; Maurice Dowdell

Special Generation is an American vocal quintet consisting of members Fernando Carter, Maurice Dowdell, Maquet Robinson, Charles Salter, and Kendrick Washington. Formed in St. Petersburg, Florida in 1989, the group were signed to MC Hammer's record label Bust It Records, a subsidiary of Capitol Records. Their debut album, Take It to the Floor (1990), was one of the earliest new jack swing albums and achieved minor success. In late 1992, the group released their second album Butterflies.

In 2020, the group reunited and released a single "I Can't Help Myself".

== History ==
The group was formed in 1989 by American rapper MC Hammer in St. Petersburg, Florida. The group sang background vocals on several of MC Hammer's songs, including "U Can't Touch This", "Help the Children", and "Have You Seen Her" for the album Please Hammer Don't Hurt 'Em (1990).

On September 24, 1990, the group released their debut album Take It to the Floor. The album peaked at number 17 on Billboard's Top R&B Albums chart. The album's lead single, "Love Me Just for Me", peaked at number 91 on the Billboard Hot 100 and number 8 on the Billboard Top R&B singles chart. Their follow-up single, "Spark of Love", peaked at number 26 on Billboard's Hot R&B Singles chart. The album also produced several additional singles, including "One Nite Lover" and "You Are Everything", the latter of which peaked at number 90 on the US Hot R&B Singles chart.

In August 1992, they released "Lift Your Head (And Smile)", the lead single from their second album. The song peaked at number 13 on Hot R&B Singles chart. In September 1992, they released their second album Butterflies on Bust It Records. In October 1992, MC Hammer dropped the group from Bust It Records after disappointment with the low sales. In 1993, the group disbanded. Robinson pursued a career as a music producer. Salter also continued to pursue a music career, performing under the stage name Max'C. Washington formed his own management company called K-WASH Management & Consulting Services and later another company called WASH Media Group, LLC in February 2010.

In February 2020, the group released a single titled "I Can't Help Myself".

== Discography ==
=== Albums ===
List of studio albums, with selected chart positions
Title	Album details	Peak chart positions
Title	Album details	US R&B
Take It to the Floor	Released: September 24, 1990; Label: Bust It Records, Capitol Records; Formats: CD, cassette, LP	17
Butterflies	Released: September 1992; Label: Bust It Records, Capitol Records; Formats: CD, cassette	—

=== Singles ===
List of singles as lead artist, with selected chart positions and certifications, showing year released and album name
Title	Year	Peak chart positions		Album
Title	Year	US	US R&B	Album
"Love Me Just for Me"	1990	91	8	Take It to the Floor
"Spark of Love"	1991	—	26	Take It to the Floor
"One Nite Lover"	1991	—	—	Take It to the Floor
"You Are Everything"	1991	—	90	Take It to the Floor
"Lift Your Head (And Smile)"	1992	—	13	Butterflies
"Butterflies"	1992	—	—	Butterflies
"I Can't Help Myself"	2020	—	—	Non-album singles
