= British Knights =

Shoe brand

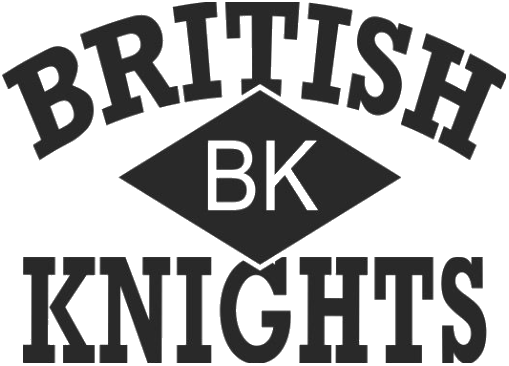
- Product type: Footwear, clothing
- Current owner: Frasers Group
- Country: U.S.
- Introduced: 1983; 43 years ago
- Previous owners: Jack Schwartz Shoes Inc.
- Website: http://www.bkfootwear.com

British Knights is an American brand founded in 1983 by Jack Schwartz Shoes Inc., based in New York City. In the 1980s, British Knights distinguished themselves as an inner-city and music-driven brand, appealing to the predominantly male youth in urban communities.

Casual wear currently commercialized under the brand include footwear (mainly sneakers) and clothing (t-shirts, hoodies, caps).

== History ==
British Knights was launched in 1983 as a casual shoe brand. In 1985, they introduced their first sneaker collection, and sales exploded. In an environment where brands kept the same style in their line for years, British Knights was one of the first brands to recognize that the sneaker business was more about fashion than performance. By introducing a new collection three to four times a year, it became popular among 15- to 24-year-old males in urban communities. The slogan "the shoe ain't nothin' without the BK button" became the brand's mantra in reference to the diamond-shaped BK logo plate that was on every shoe.

British Knights was one of the first brands to use hip hop artists as endorsers, enlisting Kool Moe Dee for the brand's introduction to TV. “How Ya Like Me Now” was broadcast on the worldwide music channel MTV.

In the late 1980s, British Knights apparel was worn by the Toronto hip-hop group Get Loose Crew. The group sought sponsorship from the company in 1988; although no formal endorsement was established, apparel was provided by the company. Members wore British Knights clothing on the cover of their 1988 self-titled album and during a televised appearance on CBC’s Switchback.

British Knights made their biggest marketing push in 1990, when they signed rapper MC Hammer to a full endorsement deal. The Hammer phenomenon, the biggest star in the music industry at the time, captivated a large number of people. British Knights sponsored his tour, did in-store events and contests, an anti-drug campaign also featured him in a British Knights sponsored television spot. Awareness of the brand increased tremendously, and the brand crossed over to a more mainstream market.

=== US and EU distribution ===
In 1998, Jack Schwartz Shoes Inc. sold the British Knights trademarks in many territories to a European company that continued manufacturing British Knights footwear for Europe and South America. British Knights EU is not connected to the original American brand. British Knights EU belongs to the Dutch company Achten Fashion Group.

In 2014, Jack Schwartz Shoes Inc. incorporated a new company, British Knights N.A (North America) and together with the help of some partners in the music and entertainment world, they revived the brand. British Knights N.A is run out of the Jack Schwartz Shoes Inc. office in New York City by the original family that launched the brand back in the 1980s.

=== Relaunch ===
In February 2014, British Knights relaunched with a series of collaborations. Along with its original owners Jack Schwartz Shoes Inc., the team behind this rebrand included designer and artist Darren Romanelli (“DRx”) who served as creative director and entrepreneur Scooter Braun of SB Projects, an entertainment and media company with ventures integrating music, film, television, technology and philanthropy.

British Knights took on a new slogan, "Artists are the new athletes." Tapping into the artistic minds from around the world, this new era of British Knights encompassed designs meant to inspire and motivate, while looking back on its legacy and pushing it into the future. Romanelli designed four new styles of the shoe that combined performance-level materials with streetwear aesthetics. Features included earth tone midtops with ribbed brown leather paneling and black and white hi-tops that incorporate the British flag.

The first designs were unveiled on February 17, 2014, at Agenda in Las Vegas before officially going on sale on March 15, 2014, at high-end retailers.

== Dymacel technology ==
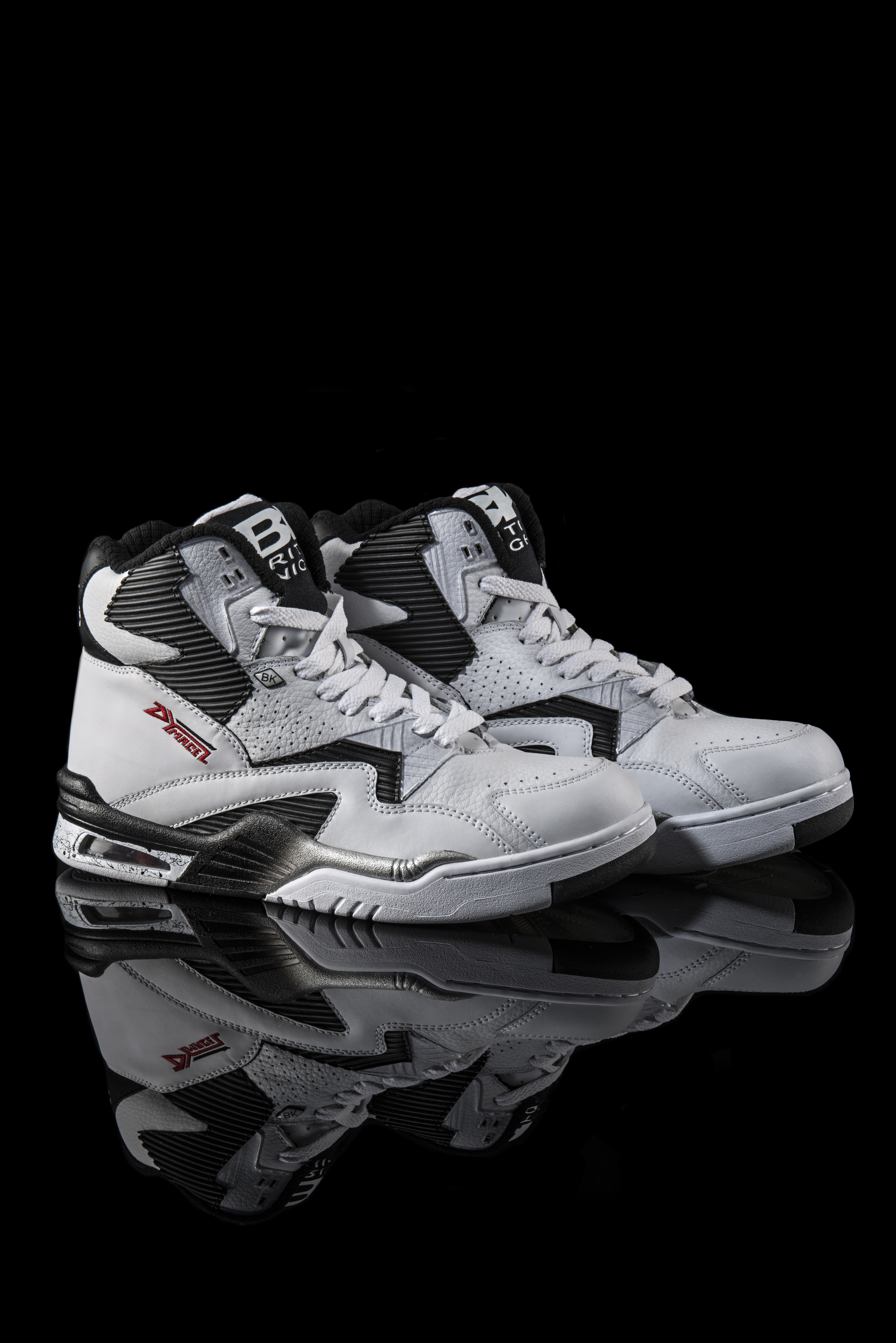
British Knights "Control Hi" in white black

British Knights introduced Dymacel, their first technology shoe, in 1991. The technology consisted of diamond-shaped green silicone cushioning embedded within a sole window, in order to effectively absorb shock by dispersing vertical impact energy into a horizontal plane while maximizing energy return. Dymacel maintains its memory after repeated compression.

== Athlete endorsements ==
In 1991, British Knights signed on their first professional athlete to endorse Dymacel - Derrick Coleman of the New Jersey Nets. Coleman wore BK Dymacels while playing in the NBA and while on the Dream Team II, in addition to appearing in TV, print and radio ads.

In 1993, NBA player Lloyd Daniels from the San Antonio Spurs was signed to endorse the British Knights "Vengeance" – which was part of the Outdoor Dymacel Collection. Daniels, known as "Swee'Pea", was featured in a national TV advertising spot.
