= The Funky Headhunter =

Studio album by Hammer
- Released: March 1, 1994
- Recorded: March – November 1993
- Genres: West Coast hip hop; G-funk
- Length: 68:08
- Labels: Giant; Reprise
- Producers: The High Street Bank Boys (exec.); The Whole 9; Teddy Riley; The Hines Brothers

Hammer chronology
Too Legit to Quit (1991)	The Funky Headhunter (1994)	Inside Out (1995)

Singles from The Funky Headhunter
- 1. "Pumps and a Bump" Released: February 28, 1994; 2. "It's All Good" Released: April 19, 1994; 3. "Don't Stop" Released: July 4, 1994

The Funky Headhunter is the fifth studio album by American rapper Hammer, released on March 1, 1994, via Giant Records and Reprise Records.

The album at the time was hailed as Hammer's comeback album. As with some previous songs such as "Crime Story" and "Help the Children" (from the album Please Hammer Don't Hurt 'Em), the content and reality about "street life" remained somewhat the same, but the sound was different which resulted in Hammer losing favor with fans. Nonetheless, the record was eventually certified platinum.

== Album history ==
Hammer's 1992 Too Legit to Quit Tour was abruptly cancelled due to financial and management issues by the end of the year. Recording seasons of the album started in March 1993 and ended on November 1993. During September 1993, negotiations of renovation of the contract with Capitol started. According to some sources, the artist was looking for a three- or four-album deal in the $20-$25-million. However an agreement was not reached. Instead, Hammer signed with Giant and Reprise, seeking a new image and looking for a "non-commercial road" new style of music.

Hammer debuted the album and video for "Pumps and a Bump" two months before its release on The Arsenio Hall Show and finally released it in March. Talk show host Arsenio Hall said to Hammer, "Women in the audience want to know, what's in your speedos in the 'Pumps and a Bump' video?" A clip from the video was then shown, to much approval from the audience. Hammer didn't give a direct answer but instead laughed. Arsenio then said, "I guess that's why they call you 'Hammer.' It ain't got nothin' to do with Hank Aaron" (which refers to the fact that Hammer was nicknamed after Aaron).

== Critical reception ==
Professional ratings
Review scores
Source	Rating
AllMusic	2.5/5 stars
Daily News	1/5 stars
Entertainment Weekly	B−
Los Angeles Times	1.5/4 stars
RapReviews	6.5/10
Select	1/5 medals

AllMusic writer Ron Wynn said about the album overall: "Hammer's sound was leaner, his rapping tougher and more fluid, and his subject matter harder and less humorous." Dennis Hunt of the Los Angeles Times felt that Hammer had "zero feel" for his choice in subgenre, but praised the record's "smashing beats" and highlighted "Don't Stop" for being "unbelievably funky". Dimitri Ehrlich of Entertainment Weekly wrote that "even with some credible producers to beef up his sound, Hammer comes off as desperate on The Funky Headhunter, and his rhymes sound more like those of a hard worker than a hard-timer." Vibe contributor Charles Aaron called it "one of the most stunning curios of pop marketing hubris ever perpetrated", criticizing Hammer's half-hearted attempts at dissing other rappers, and the tracks for utilizing the overused G-funk sound and lacking lyrical substance or even "a nifty turn of phrase." In a 2020 retrospective review, Steve 'Flash' Juon of RapReviews was critical of Hammer's offbeat flow delivering bars with an overabundance of syllables, lack of curses and swear words despite the image change, and constant references to his previous pop success, but conceded that the overall production was actually good, calling it "a 1990's collision between Teddy Riley and Warren G and it works perfectly." He concluded that: "I can't deny the transformation is comical, but it's also not as terrible as first I thought."

== Commercial reception ==
The album peaked at number two on the R&B charts and remained in the Top 30 midway through the year. The album eventually reached number 12 on the Billboard 200 chart The album managed to become certified platinum. As of 1996, it sold over 733,000 copies in the United States.

"Pumps and a Bump" proved to be a controversial track on this album, somewhat affecting Hammer's image. However, the single peaked at number three on the US Rap charts. It was banned from heavy rotation on MTV with censors claiming that the depiction of Hammer in Speedos was too graphic. This led to an alternative video being filmed (with Hammer fully clothed) that was directed by Bay Area native Craig S. Brooks.

"It's All Good", produced by The Whole 9, was the second single released on this album, and peaked on the record charts as follows: US number 46, US R&B number 14, US Rap number three and UK number 52.

== Track listing ==
Information taken from Amazon.com, Apple Music and Spotify.

No.	Title	Writer(s)	Producer(s)	Length
1.	"Intro"			2:11
2.	"Oaktown"	Stanley Burrell; Deuce Deuce; Prince Nelson	MC Hammer; The Whole 9	4:16
3.	"It's All Good"	Deuce Deuce; Burrell; The Whole 9	Hammer; The Whole 9	4:10
4.	"Somethin' for the O.G.'s"	Deuce Deuce; Burrell	Gerald Baillergeau; Hammer	4:15
5.	"Don't Stop"	Aquil Davidson; Menton Smith; Teddy Riley	Riley	5:34
6.	"Pumps and a Bump"	David L. Spradley; Deuce Deuce; Garry M. Shider; George Clinton Jr.; Baillergeau; Burrell	Baillergeau; Hammer	5:05
7.	"One Mo' Time"	Deuce Deuce; Burrell	Hammer; The Whole 9	4:08
8.	"Clap Yo' Hands"	Deuce Deuce; Burrell	Hammer; The Whole 9	3:47
9.	"Break 'Em off Somethin' Proper"	Deuce Deuce; Burrell	Baillergeau; Hammer; The Whole 9	4:18
10.	"Don't Fight the Feelin'"	Ben Ross; Deuce Deuce; Burrell	Hammer; The Whole 9	3:40
11.	"Somethin' 'Bout the Goldie in Me"	Deuce Deuce; Burrell	Hammer; The Whole 9	3:49
12.	"Sleepin' on the Master Plan"	Diaz; Burrell; Kurupt	Hammer; Tha Dogg Pound	4:50
13.	"It's All That"	Deuce Deuce; Burrell; Sylvester Stewart	Hammer; The Whole 9	3:56
14.	"The Funky Headhunter"	Deuce Deuce; Burrell; The Whole 9	Andra Hines; Duncan Hines; Hammer; The Whole 9	3:45
15.	"Pumps and a Bump Reprise (Bump Teddy Bump)"	Spradley; Deuce Deuce; Shider; Clinton Jr.; Baillergeau; Burrell	Baillergeau; Hammer	6:38
16.	"Help Lord (Won't You Come)"	Burrell	Hammer; The Whole 9	3:44
Total length:				68:11

Exclusive bonus tracks (UK, Belgium and Japan)
No.	Title	Length
17.	"Do It Like This"
18.	"Heartbreaka (Is What They Call Me)"

== Samples ==
Break 'Em Off Somethin' Proper

- "So Ruff, So Tuff" by Roger Troutman
- "Stay" by Jodeci
- "Check the Rhime" by A Tribe Called Quest

Don't Fight the Feelin'

- "Person to Person" by Average White Band

Don't Stop

- "Funkin' for Jamaica (N.Y.)" by Tom Browne
- "Der Kommissar" by Falco
- "Atomic Dog" by George Clinton
- "La Di Da Di" by Doug E. Fresh

It's All Good

- "Dusic" by Brick
- "Hobo Scratch" by Malcolm McLaren

Oaktown

- "More Bounce to the Ounce" by Zapp
- "Get It Up" by The Time

Pumps and a Bump

- "Atomic Dog" by George Clinton

Somethin' for the O.G.'s

- "Dance Floor" by Zapp
- "Atomic Dog" by George Clinton

== Personnel ==
Adapted from the liner notes of The Funky Headhunter.

- Wilton Rabb – guitar (tracks 8, 11–14)
- Ben Ross – bass (track 14)
- Eddy Schreyer – mastering (Future Disc, Los Angeles)
- Nancie Stern, Mary-Jo Braun – sample clearance assistance (Music Resources)
- Kevin Design Hosmann – art direction
- Michael Miller – photography
- Madame Mack Style – stylist

== Charts ==
Chart (1994)	Peak position
Australian Albums (ARIA)	192

== Certifications ==
Region	Certification	Certified units/sales
Japan (RIAJ)	Gold	100,000^{^}
United States (RIAA)	Platinum	1,000,000^{^}
^{^} Shipments figures based on certification alone.
