= CEMA (record label distributor) =

American record label of Capitol-EMI

CEMA was an American record label distribution branch of Capitol-EMI. The name CEMA stood for the four EMI-owned labels it originally distributed: Capitol Records, EMI Records, Manhattan Records and Angel Records. Subsequently, several other labels were distributed, including Chrysalis Records, Virgin Records and Blue Note Records. CEMA was one of the six largest record distribution branches in the US. After a restructuring, CEMA was renamed EMI Music Distribution (EMD). CEMA Special Markets was the division which handled licensing of recordings by Capitol-EMI artists, and also distributed juke-box singles.

== Lawsuit ==
CEMA was the subject of a class action lawsuit in 1993 when they notified several independent music dealers that they could not place orders for the Garth Brooks' album In Pieces because they sold used CDs at their stores.
