= Feel My Power =

Studio album by M.C. Hammer
- Released: August 13, 1986
- Recorded: 1986
- Genre: Hip hop; dance
- Length: 33:47
- Label: Bustin' Records
- Producer: M.C. Hammer, Felton Pilate

M.C. Hammer chronology
Feel My Power (1986)	Let's Get It Started (1988)

Singles from Feel My Power
- 1. "Ring 'Em" Released: 1987; 2. "Get It Started" Released: 1988

Feel My Power is the debut studio album by American rapper M.C. Hammer released in 1986 by Bustin’ Records. The album was produced by Felton Pilate of Con Funk Shun.

Feel My Power sold over 60,000 copies, a considerable success for a small independent label of the era, which led to several offers from major labels.

"That's What I Said" and "Feel My Power" were later used for the Rocky V film and the Rocky V soundtrack. "The Thrill Is Gone" samples the original song by Roy Hawkins and Rick Darnell. Additionally, the album samples James Brown.

== Track listing ==
All tracks are written by MC Hammer.

No.	Title	Length
1.	"That's What I Said"	4:24
2.	"Ring 'Em"	4:05
3.	"Get It Started"	4:19
4.	"Feel My Power"	4:03
5.	"The Thrill Is Gone"	4:37
6.	"Mix It Toss It & Bust It"	3:52
7.	"Son of the King"	3:27
8.	"Brother Versus Brother"	3:51
9.	"I Can Make It Better"	3:36
