= Let's Get It Started (album) =

Studio album by M.C. Hammer
- Released: September 28, 1988
- Genres: Hip hop; dance
- Length: 42:33
- Labels: Capitol; EMI
- Producers: M.C. Hammer, Felton Pilate

M.C. Hammer chronology
Feel My Power (1986)	Let's Get It Started (1988)	Please Hammer Don't Hurt 'Em (1990)

Singles from Let's Get It Started
- 1. "Let's Get It Started" Released: 1988; 2. "Pump It Up" Released: 1988; 3. "Turn This Mutha Out" Released: 1989; 4. "They Put Me In The Mix" Released: 1989

Professional ratings
Review scores
Source	Rating
AllMusic	3/5 stars
Robert Christgau	C+
RapReviews	3/10
Record Mirror	5/10

Let's Get It Started is the second studio album, and first major-label debut, by American rapper MC Hammer. It was released on September 28, 1988, by Capitol Records and EMI Records . The album was produced by Hammer and Felton Pilate.

Recorded between 1987 and 1988, Let's Get It Started received mixed to negative reviews upon its release, but has since gone on to be praised as a hip-hop classic. The album was supported by the release of four official singles: "Pump It Up", "Let's Get It Started", "Turn This Mutha Out" and "They Put Me in the Mix" which all charted. Music videos were also produced for all of these songs. Also, it won two American Music Awards for Let's Get It Started: Favorite Rap/Hip-Hop Artist and Favorite Rap/Hip-Hop Album. It was also nominated for Favorite Soul/R&B Album.

Let's Get It Started peaked at No. 30 on the Billboard 200 went double platinum by RIAA for selling over two million of copies. It was No. 1 on the Top R&B chart in the U.S. The album produced several Top 5 hits. "Turn This Mutha Out" peaked the highest at No. 3 on the US Rap charts, and also cracked the Top 15 at No. 12 on both the Dance and R&B charts. However, none of the singles made much of a dent in the pop charts.

== Background ==
In 1986, M.C. Hammer single was "Ring 'Em," recorded in his basement, privately pressed and distributed from the trunk of his car. The funding came in two parts. Former A's player Mike Davis was looking to make an investment and backed the initial pressing with a $20,000 loan; when Hammer experienced the cash-flow problems endemic to independent entrepreneurs, he got a $20,000 boost from Dwayne Murphy, who had already heard the song on Oakland radio. Hammer's self-produced "Feel My Power" album sold 50,000 copies before Capitol Records brought him into the majors and recycled seven of its songs for his next studio album.

Following the success of the album, Capitol offered him a $10 million distribution deal. Following that, Hammer re-issued his first record (a revised version of Feel My Power) with additional tracks added and sold over 2 million copies. Recorded between 1987 and 1988, it was released on September 28, 1988. "Pump It Up", "Turn This Mutha Out", "Let's Get It Started" and "They Put Me in the Mix" were released as singles from the album, which all charted.

"Turn This Mutha Out" samples George Clinton's "Give Up the Funk (Tear the Roof off the Sucker)", as well as the Incredible Bongo Band's "Apache".

== Commercial reception ==
Let's Get It Started peaked at number 30 on the US Billboard 200. It was certified two times platinum by the RIAA for selling over two million copies in the United States. It also topped the US Top R&B albums chart and was the third best performance album of 1989. It reached the Top 50 Australia, Austria, Germany, Switzerland and United Kingdom as well as being certified Gold in Japan for selling over 100,000 copies.

The popular "Turn This Mutha Out" peaked at No. 3 on the US Rap charts and cracked the Top 15 at No. 12 on both the Dance Club and R&B/Hip-Hop charts. In 1989, the song was nominated for a MTV Video Music Award for Best Rap Video. M.C. Hammer was good friends with Arsenio Hall, and therefore was invited to perform on The Arsenio Hall Show in 1989, prior to the release of Please Hammer Don't Hurt 'Em. With the success of that album, Feel My Power and Let's Get It Started received more attention.

Music videos were produced for "Ring 'Em/Pump It Up (Here's the News)", "Let's Get It Started", "They Put Me in the Mix" (later remixed) and "Turn This Mutha Out". Hammer used some of the proceeds from this album to install a rolling recording studio in the back of his tour bus, where he recorded much of his second album. "Turn This Mutha Out" is also featured on the MTV Party to Go 1 album. Hammer performed "Pump it Up" during Showtime at the Apollo on September 16, 1989.

In January 1990, Hammer won two American Music Awards for Let's Get It Started: Favorite Rap/Hip-Hop Artist and Favorite Rap/Hip-Hop Album. It was also nominated for Favorite Soul/R&B Album.

The single "Let's Get it Started" became the record that began the now-legendary rivalry between Hammer and LL Cool J. In the song's lyrics, Hammer braggadociously stated that he is second to none, in comparison to other rappers: "And when it comes to straight up rockin’ / I’m second to none / from Doug E. Fresh to LL or DJ Run." LL Cool J would later respond with "To da Break of Dawn", and revisit the rivalry years later with "I Shot Ya (remix)".

== Track listing ==
1. "Intro: Turn This Mutha Out" (Explicit) 2:38
2. "Let's Get It Started (Radio Edit)" 4:08
3. "Ring 'Em" 4:20
4. "Cold Go MC Hammer" 4:05
5. "You're Being Served" 4:45
6. "It's Gone (Edit)" 3:56
7. "(Hammer Hammer) They Put Me in the Mix (Edit)" 3:28
8. "Son of the King" 3:53
9. "That's What I Said" 3:38
10. "Feel My Power" 3:07
11. "Pump It Up (Here's the News) (Radio Edit)" 4:35

Length: 42:33

== Samples used ==
"Let's Get It Started"

- "Change The Beat" by Fab Five Freddy
- "Another One Bites the Dust" by Queen
- "Rock Box" by Run-DMC
- "Rock The Bells" by LL Cool J
- "Give It to Me Baby" by Rick James

"Pump It Up"

- "The Champ" by the Mohawks
- "Hot Pants" by James Brown
- "Al-Naafiysh (The Soul)" by Hashim
- "The Big Beat" by Billy Squier

"Turn This Mutha Out"

- "Apache" by Incredible Bongo Band
- "Give Up the Funk (Tear the Roof Off the Sucker)" by Parliament.
- "Rocket in the Pocket (live)" by Cerrone

"They Put Me in the Mix"

- "Get Up (I Feel Like Being a) Sex Machine" by James Brown
- "Change the Beat" by Fab 5 Freddy
- "D'Ya Like Scratchin'?" by Malcolm McLaren and World's Famous Supreme Team
- "Housequake" by Prince

== See also ==
- List of number-one R&B albums of 1989 (U.S.)

== Charts ==
=== Weekly charts ===
Chart (1988–1991)	Peak position
Australian Albums (ARIA)	188
Austrian Albums (Ö3 Austria)	25
German Albums (Offizielle Top 100)	42
New Zealand Albums (RMNZ)	39
Swiss Albums (Schweizer Hitparade)	19
UK Albums (Official Charts)	46
US Billboard 200	30
US Top R&B/Hip-Hop Albums (Billboard)	1

=== Year-end charts ===
Chart (1989)	Position
US Billboard 200	37
US Top R&B/Hip-Hop Albums (Billboard)	3

== Certifications ==
Region	Certification	Certified units/sales
Japan (RIAJ)	Gold	100,000^{^}
United States (RIAA)	2× Platinum	2,000,000^{^}
^{^} Shipments figures based on certification alone.
