= New Zealand top 50 singles of 1988 =

This is a list of the top 50 singles in New Zealand of 1988 as compiled by Recorded Music NZ in the end-of-year chart of the Official New Zealand Music Chart. Six singles by New Zealand artists are included on the chart, the highest being the Holidaymakers' debut single "Sweet Lovers" at No. 1.

== Chart ==
Key
† – Single of New Zealand origin

Rank	Artist	Title
1	Holidaymakers	"Sweet Lovers" †
2	U2	"One Tree Hill"
3	U2	"Desire"
4	MARRS	"Pump Up the Volume"
5	Billy Ocean	"Get Outta My Dreams, Get into My Car"
6	Tex Pistol & Rikki Morris	"Nobody Else" †
7	Ardijah	"Watchin' U" †
8	Times Two	"Cecilia"
9	Belinda Carlisle	"Heaven Is a Place on Earth"
10	The Timelords	"Doctorin' the Tardis"
11	New Order	"Blue Monday 1988"
12	Big Pig	"Breakaway"
13	Aswad	"Don't Turn Around"
14	Eddy Grant	"Gimme Hope Jo'anna"
15	Rick Astley	"Never Gonna Give You Up"
16	Guns N' Roses	"Sweet Child o' Mine"
17	Bobby McFerrin	"Don't Worry, Be Happy"
18	Natalie Cole	"Pink Cadillac"
19	Yazz and The Plastic Population	"The Only Way Is Up"
20	Crowded House	"Better Be Home Soon" †
21	Kylie Minogue	"Got to Be Certain"
22	Prince	"Alphabet St."
23	Pet Shop Boys	"Heart"
24	Bros	"Drop the Boy"
25	Def Leppard	"Love Bites"
26	Tiffany	"I Think We're Alone Now"
27	Kylie Minogue	"I Should Be So Lucky"
28	Tiffany	"Could've Been"
29	Fairground Attraction	"Perfect"
30	Eric B. & Rakim	"Paid in Full"
31	Phil Collins	"A Groovy Kind of Love"
32	When the Cat's Away	"Melting Pot" †
33	Suave	"My Girl"
34	Def Leppard	"Armageddon It"
35	Bon Jovi	"Bad Medicine"
36	Ben Liebrand	"Stuck on Earth"
37	Bill Medley & Jennifer Warnes	"(I've Had) The Time of My Life"
38	Wet Wet Wet	"Sweet Little Mystery"
39	Hothouse Flowers	"Don't Go"
40	Jerry Harrison	"Rev It Up"
41	John Farnham	"Age of Reason"
42	Salt-N-Pepa	"Push It"
43	UB40 ft. Chrissie Hynde	"Breakfast in Bed"
44	The Fat Boys	"The Twist"
45	The Fan Club	"Sensation" †
46	INXS	"Devil Inside"
47	T'Pau	"China in Your Hand"
48	The Robert Cray Band	"Don't Be Afraid of the Dark"
49	"Weird Al" Yankovic	"Fat"
50	Taylor Dayne	"Tell It to My Heart"

== Chart by numbers ==
=== Origin ===
==== By artist ====
The following shows the country of origin from where the artist (including any featured artist where applicable) originate from. Artists who appear more than once have only been tallied once.

Country	Total
United States	24
England	15
New Zealand	7
Australia	5
Ireland	2
Scotland	2
Netherlands	1
Trinidad and Tobago	1

Notes
- Although born in Trinidad and Tobago, Billy Ocean was raised in England and as such both countries have been included in his tally.
- Although born in Guyana, Eddy Grant was raised in England and as such both countries have been included in his tally.
- Although born in England, Rikki Morris is regarded as a New Zealand artist.
- Crowded House was formed in Melbourne, Australia with members from both New Zealand and Australia, as such both countries have been included in their tally.
- Although born in England, John Farnham was raised in Australia and is regarded as an Australian artist.
- While regarded as a duo, Eric B. & Rakim have been classed as separate entities.
- While regarded as a duo, Tex Pistol & Rikki Morris have been classed as separate entities.

==== By single ====
The following shows the country of origin from which the singles originate regardless of who the artist is.

Country	Total
United States	20
England	14
New Zealand	7
Australia	5
Ireland	3
Scotland	2
Netherlands	1

Notes
- Although from New Zealand and Australia, Crowded House have been counted for both in the singles tally for "Better Be Home Soon".

=== Most singles ===
Shows the artists with the most singles to appear in this chart. Includes where they appear as a featured artist, however where a singer (e.g. Chrissie Hynde) appears as a guest singer, this does not count towards their groups tally.

Artist	Total
U2	2
Kylie Minogue	2
Tiffany	2
Def Leppard	2

=== Format ===
The following shows where each single appears on, whether it was the artists album, a non-album single, or as part of a soundtrack.

Format	Total
Albums	42
non-album singles	6
Soundtracks	2

Notes
- The song "Blue Monday 1988" appears as a non-album single and later on the compilation Substance and Technique.
- The song "(I've Had) The Time of My Life" appears on the soundtrack for Dirty Dancing and Bill Medley & Jennifer Warnes' albums.
- The song "Pump Up the Volume" was released as a non-album single by M/A/R/R/S.

=== Multiple releases ===
The following shows singles that had multiple releases from the same album.

Title	Total	Singles
Kylie (Kylie Minogue)	2	I Should Be So Lucky; Got to Be Certain
Tiffany (Tiffany)	2	I Think We're Alone Now; Could've Been
Hysteria (Def Leppard)	2	Love Bites; Armageddon It

=== Type ===
The following shows the denomination that each single was released as, whether as a solo artist or as part of a group, band or duo. Also shows how many singles had guest artists.

Type	Total
Solo artists	21
Groups	25
Duos	2
Collaborations	1
Featured Artists	1
Groups featuring solo	1

Notes
- M/A/R/R/S have been regarded as a group in this instance.
- Tex Pistol & Rikki Morris have been regarded as a collaboration.
- UB40 ft. Chrissie Hynde has been included in the tally for featured artists.

=== Top Genre ===
The following shows the most common genres the Top 50 singles are regarded as (as per their genre descriptions in the singles entries. Where a genre was not noted, the genre of the album was used instead. Subgenres have been kept as separate entries).

Genre	Total	Singles
Pop	18	Sweet Lovers (Holidaymakers); Watchin' U (Ardijah); Cecilia (Times Two); Heaven Is a Place on Earth (Belinda Carlisle); Breakaway (Big Pig); Never Gonna Give You Up (Rick Astley); Pink Cadillac (Natalie Cole); Got to Be Certain (Kylie Minogue); Heart (Pet Shop Boys); Drop the Boy (Bros); I Should Be So Lucky (Kylie Minogue); Could've Been (Tiffany); Perfect (Fairground Attraction); A Groovy Kind of Love (Phil Collins); Melting Pot (When the Cat's Away); Sweet Little Mystery (Wet Wet Wet); Sensation (The Fan Club); China in Your Hand (T'Pau)
Rock	10	One Tree Hill (U2); Desire (U2); Nobody Else (Tex Pistol & Rikki Morris); Sweet Child o' Mine (Guns N' Roses); Better Be Home Soon (Crowded House); Love Bites (Def Leppard); Armageddon It (Def Leppard); Bad Medicine (Bon Jovi); Rev It Up (Jerry Harrison: Casual Gods); Devil Inside (INXS)
Dance-pop	5	Get Outta My Dreams, Get into My Car (Billy Ocean); Blue Monday 1988 (New Order); The Only Way Is Up (Yazz and the Plastic Population); My Girl (Suave); Tell It to My Heart (Taylor Dayne)
R&B	4	Get Outta My Dreams, Get into My Car (Billy Ocean); Pink Cadillac (Natalie Cole); My Girl (Suave); Don't Be Afraid of the Dark (The Robert Cray Band)
House	3	Pump Up the Volume (M/A/R/R/S); The Only Way Is Up (Yazz and the Plastic Population); Push It (Salt-N-Pepa)
Hip hop	3	Pump Up the Volume (M/A/R/R/S); Paid in Full (Eric B. & Rakim); Push It (Salt-N-Pepa)
Synth-pop	3	Blue Monday 1988 (New Order); Heart (Pet Shop Boys); China in Your Hand (T'Pau)
Pop rock	2	Heaven Is a Place on Earth (Belinda Carlisle); Age of Reason (John Farnham)
Funk	2	Watchin' U (Ardijah); Alphabet St. (Prince)
Reggae	2	Don't Turn Around (Aswad); Gimme Hope Jo'anna (Eddy Grant)
Hard rock	2	Sweet Child o' Mine (Guns N' Roses); Devil Inside (INXS)
Soul	2	Pink Cadillac (Natalie Cole); Don't Be Afraid of the Dark (The Robert Cray Band)
Dance	2	Stuck on Earth (Ben Liebrand); Tell It to My Heart (Taylor Dayne)
A cappella	1	Don't Worry, Be Happy (Bobby McFerrin)
Novelty	1	Doctorin' the Tardis (The Timelords)
Funk rock	1	Alphabet St. (Prince)
Freestyle	1	My Girl (Suave)
Glam metal	1	Bad Medicine (Bon Jovi)
Blues rock	1	Don't Be Afraid of the Dark (The Robert Cray Band)
Comedy	1	Fat ("Weird Al" Yankovic)

=== Top Labels ===
The following shows the most common record labels that a single was associated with. Any label that only had one single has not been noted.

Label	Total	Singles
PWL	3	Never Gonna Give You Up (Rick Astley); Got to Be Certain (Kylie Minogue); I Should Be So Lucky (Kylie Minogue)
Island Records	3	One Tree Hill (U2); Desire (U2); Don't Turn Around (Aswad)
Capitol	3	Better Be Home Soon (Crowded House); My Girl (Suave); Age of Reason (John Farnham)
MCA	2	I Think We're Alone Now (Tiffany); Could've Been (Tiffany)
Pagan	2	Sweet Lovers (Holidaymakers); Nobody Else (Tex Pistol & Rikki Morris)
EMI-Manhattan	2	Don't Worry, Be Happy (Bobby McFerrin); Pink Cadillac (Natalie Cole)
Mercury	2	Love Bites (Def Leppard); Armageddon It (Def Leppard)
Mushroom	2	Got to Be Certain (Kylie Minogue); I Should Be So Lucky (Kylie Minogue)
RCA	2	Never Gonna Give You Up (Rick Astley); Perfect (Fairground Attraction)
London	2	Don't Go (Hothouse Flowers); Push It (Salt-N-Pepa)
Next Plateau	2	Push It (Salt-N-Pepa); The Twist (The Fat Boys)
WEA	2	Watchin' U (Ardijah); Breakaway (Big Pig)

=== Top songwriters ===
The following shows the songwriters who had the most top-selling singles of 1988 in New Zealand.

Writer	Total	Singles
Mike Stock	3	Never Gonna Give You Up (Rick Astley); Got to Be Certain (Kylie Minogue); I Should Be So Lucky (Kylie Minogue)
Matt Aitken	3	Never Gonna Give You Up (Rick Astley); Got to Be Certain (Kylie Minogue); I Should Be So Lucky (Kylie Minogue)
Pete Waterman	3	Never Gonna Give You Up (Rick Astley); Got to Be Certain (Kylie Minogue); I Should Be So Lucky (Kylie Minogue)
Bono	2	One Tree Hill (U2); Desire (U2)
The Edge	2	One Tree Hill (U2); Desire (U2)
Adam Clayton	2	One Tree Hill (U2); Desire (U2)
Larry Mullen Jr.	2	One Tree Hill (U2); Desire (U2)
Joe Elliott	2	Love Bites (Def Leppard); Armageddon It (Def Leppard)
Robert John "Mutt" Lange	2	Love Bites (Def Leppard); Armageddon It (Def Leppard)

=== Most/Least songwriters ===
The following shows the singles that were credited as having been written by only one person and the singles that had the most credited writers of 1988.

Single	Total	Songwriter/s
"Sweet Lovers" (Holidaymakers)	1	Bill Withers
"Nobody Else" (Tex Pistol & Rikki Morris)	1	Rikki Morris
"Watchin' U" (Ardijah)	1	Ryan Monga
"Gimme Hope Jo'anna" (Eddy Grant)	1	Eddy Grant
"Don't Worry, Be Happy" (Bobby McFerrin)	1	Bobby McFerrin
"Pink Cadillac" (Natalie Cole)	1	Bruce Springsteen
"Better Be Home Soon" (Crowded House)	1	Neil Finn
"Could've Been" (Tiffany)	1	Lois Blaisch
"Perfect" (Fairground Attraction)	1	Mark E. Nevin
"Pump Up the Volume" (M/A/R/R/S)	6	Martyn Young; Steve Young; John Fryer; Mike Stock; Matt Aitken; Peter Waterman; Colin Thurston

=== Top producers ===
The following shows the producers who had the most singles to appear on this chart.

Producer	Total	Singles
Mike Stock	3	Never Gonna Give You Up (Rick Astley); Got to Be Certain (Kylie Minogue); I Should Be So Lucky (Kylie Minogue)
Matt Aitken	3	Never Gonna Give You Up (Rick Astley); Got to Be Certain (Kylie Minogue); I Should Be So Lucky (Kylie Minogue)
Pete Waterman	3	Never Gonna Give You Up (Rick Astley); Got to Be Certain (Kylie Minogue); I Should Be So Lucky (Kylie Minogue)
Robert John Mutt Lange	3	Get Outta My Dreams, Get into My Car (Billy Ocean); Love Bites (Def Leppard); Armageddon It (Def Leppard)
George Tobin	2	I Think We're Alone Now (Tiffany); Could've Been (Tiffany)
