= List of Hot Soul Singles number ones of 1978 =

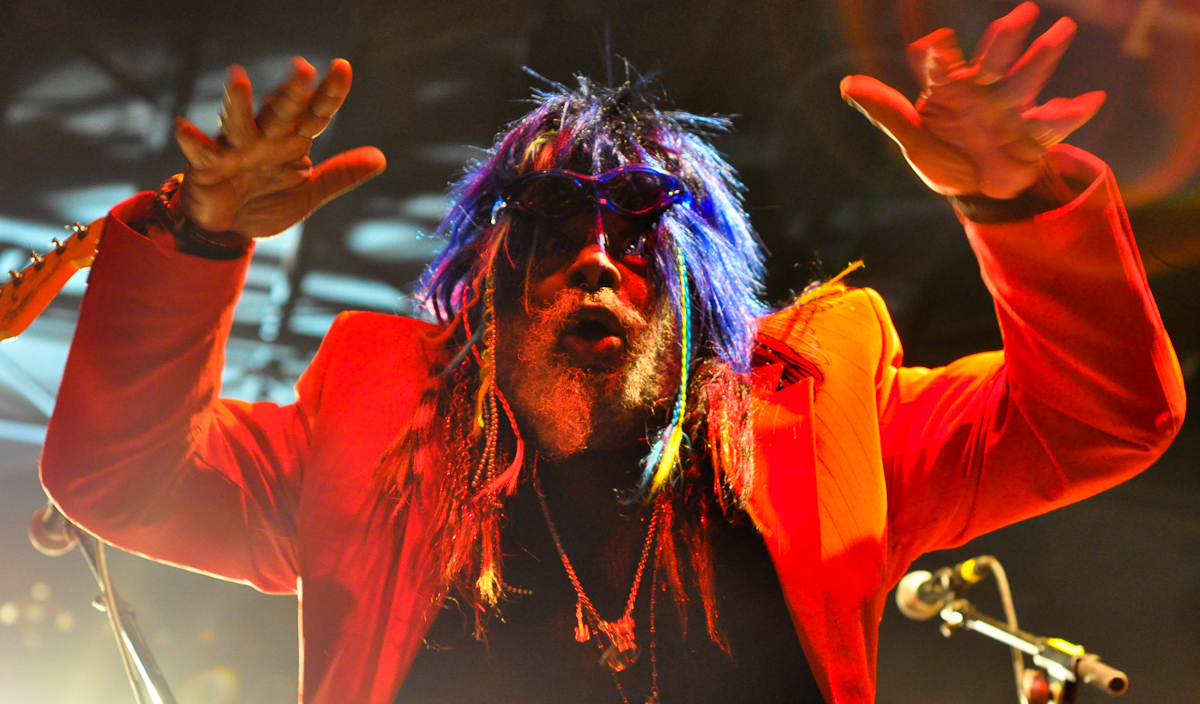
George Clinton (pictured in later life) topped the chart in 1978 as the leader of two groups, Parliament and Funkadelic.

Billboard published a weekly chart in 1978 ranking the top-performing singles in the United States in soul music and related African American-oriented genres; the chart has undergone various name changes over the decades to reflect the evolution of black music and since 2005 has been published as Hot R&B/Hip-Hop Songs. In 1978, it was published under the title Hot Soul Singles, and 22 different singles reached number one.

Three acts which formed part of George Clinton's Parliament-Funkadelic collective, known for its eclectic mix of funk and hard rock and its use of surreal futuristic imagery, topped the chart in 1978. In the issue of Billboard dated March 4, Parliament reached number one for the first time with "Flash Light". After three weeks in the top spot, the single was displaced by "Bootzilla" by Bootsy's Rubber Band, led by bass guitarist Bootsy Collins, one of the collective's principal members. Finally, in September, Funkadelic gained its first chart-topper with "One Nation Under a Groove (Part 1)". Both Parliament and Funkadelic featured largely the same musicians, with the different names reflecting differing styles of music. "One Nation Under a Groove (Part 1)" was the year's longest-running chart-topper, spending six weeks at number one. The track is regarded as a classic of the funk genre and was included on a list of 500 songs that shaped rock and roll compiled by the Rock and Roll Hall of Fame.

Several other acts gained the first soul number ones of their respective careers in 1978, beginning in the issue of Billboard dated January 7 when Con Funk Shun topped the chart with "Ffun". In February, both Stargard and Enchantment reached number one for the first time with "Theme Song from 'Which Way Is Up'" and "It's You That I Need", respectively. Both Johnny Mathis and Deniece Williams topped the chart for the first time when they collaborated on "Too Much, Too Little, Too Late" in April, and Quincy Jones, a successful producer, composer and band leader since the 1950s, gained his first chart-topping soul single in his own right with "Stuff Like That". Later in the year, Teddy Pendergrass achieved his first solo number one after having been previously successful as the lead singer of Harold Melvin & the Blue Notes, and Rick James, A Taste of Honey and Foxy all reached the top of the chart for the first time. The year's final chart-topper "Le Freak" was another debut number one, as Chic reached the top spot for the first time in the issue of Billboard dated December 2 and stayed there for the remainder of the year. The song is regarded as a classic of the disco genre and was selected in 2018 for preservation in the National Recording Registry by the Library of Congress as being "culturally, historically, or aesthetically significant".

== Chart history ==
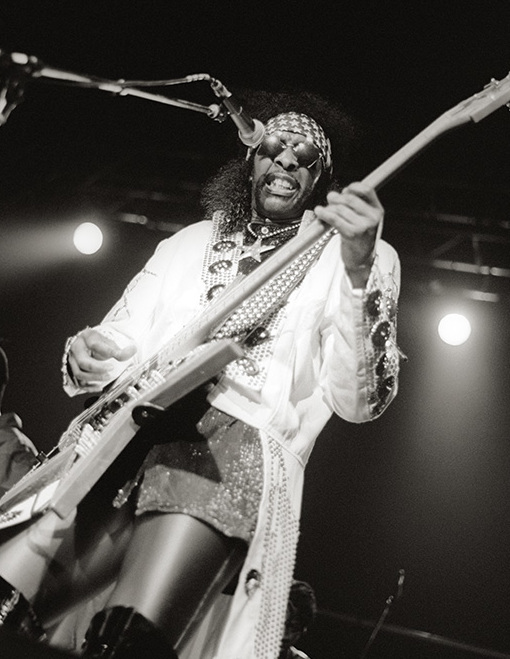
Bootsy Collins topped the chart as the leader of Bootsy's Rubber Band and also as a member of both Parliament and Funkadelic.

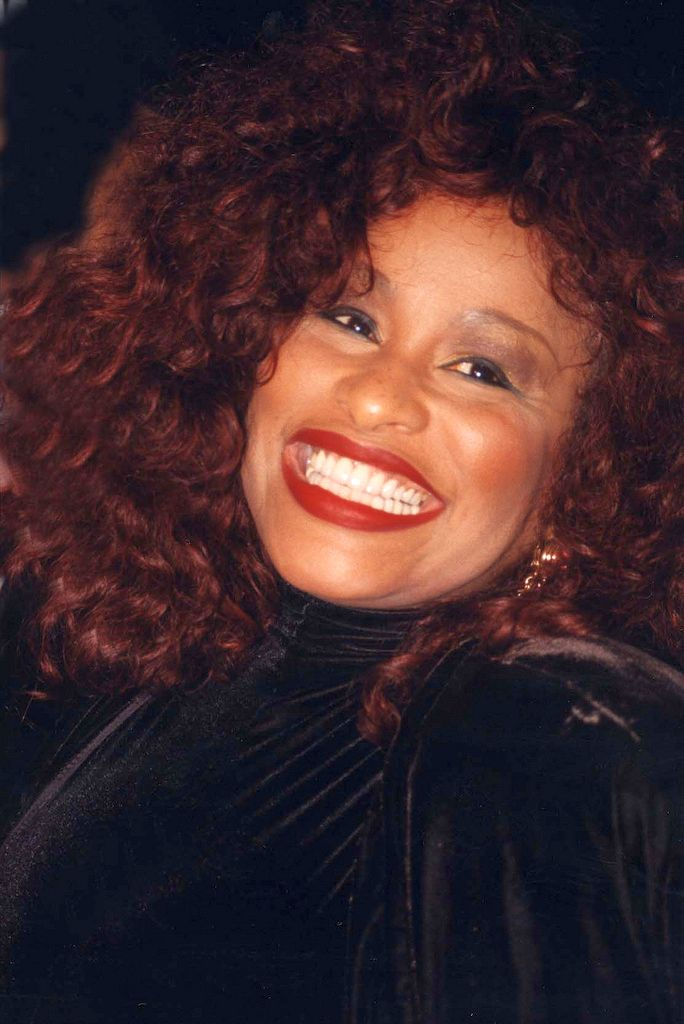
Chaka Khan (pictured in later life) had her first solo number one in 1978 with "I'm Every Woman".

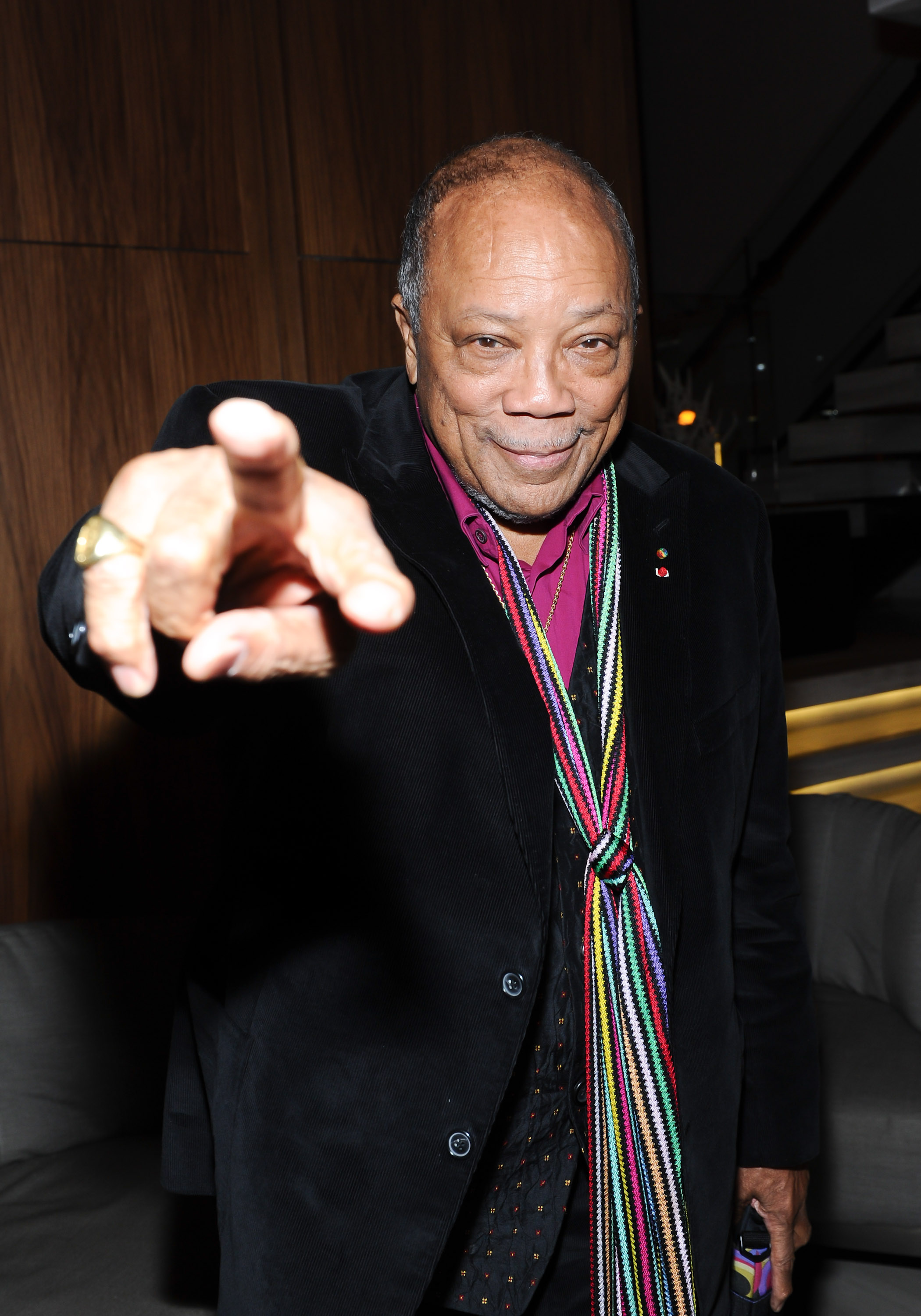
"Stuff Like That" was a chart-topper for Quincy Jones (pictured in later life).

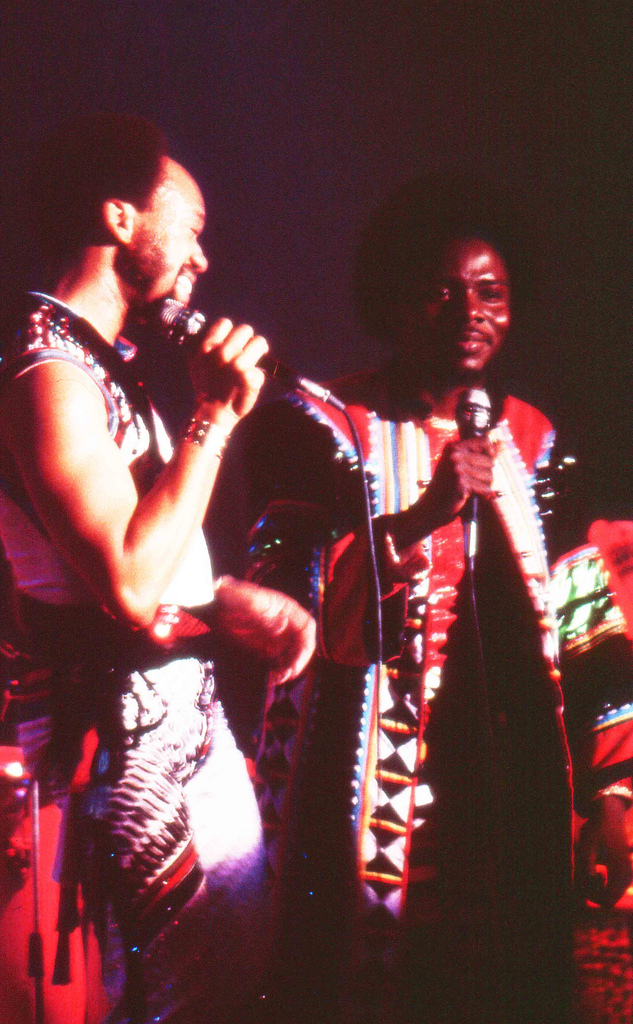
"Serpentine Fire" by Earth, Wind & Fire topped Billboard's year-end soul chart, although its final appearance at number one on the Hot Soul Singles chart had been in the issue dated December 31, 1977.

Chart history
Issue date	Title	Artist(s)	Ref.
January 7	"Ffun"	Con Funk Shun	
January 14	"Ffun"	Con Funk Shun	
January 21	"Our Love"	Natalie Cole	
January 28	"Our Love"	Natalie Cole	
February 4	"Theme Song from 'Which Way Is Up'"	Stargard	
February 11	"Theme Song from 'Which Way Is Up'"	Stargard	
February 18	"Too Hot ta Trot"	Commodores	
February 25	"It's You That I Need"	Enchantment	
March 4	"Flash Light"	Parliament	
March 11	"Flash Light"	Parliament	
March 18	"Flash Light"	Parliament	
March 25	"Bootzilla"	Bootsy's Rubber Band	
April 1	"The Closer I Get to You"	Roberta Flack and Donny Hathaway	
April 8	"The Closer I Get to You"	Roberta Flack and Donny Hathaway	
April 15	"Too Much, Too Little, Too Late"	Johnny Mathis and Deniece Williams	
April 22	"Too Much, Too Little, Too Late"	Johnny Mathis and Deniece Williams	
April 29	"Too Much, Too Little, Too Late"	Johnny Mathis and Deniece Williams	
May 6	"Too Much, Too Little, Too Late"	Johnny Mathis and Deniece Williams	
May 13	"Take Me to the Next Phase (Part 1)"	The Isley Brothers	
May 20	"Take Me to the Next Phase (Part 1)"	The Isley Brothers	
May 27	"Use ta Be My Girl"	The O'Jays	
June 3	"Use ta Be My Girl"	The O'Jays	
June 10	"Use ta Be My Girl"	The O'Jays	
June 17	"Use ta Be My Girl"	The O'Jays	
June 24	"Use ta Be My Girl"	The O'Jays	
July 1	"Stuff Like That"	Quincy Jones	
July 8	"Close the Door"	Teddy Pendergrass	
July 15	"Close the Door"	Teddy Pendergrass	
July 22	"You and I"	Rick James	
July 29	"You and I"	Rick James	
August 5	"Boogie Oogie Oogie"	A Taste Of Honey	
August 12	"Three Times a Lady"	Commodores	
August 19	"Three Times a Lady"	Commodores	
August 26	"Get Off"	Foxy	
September 2	"Get Off"	Foxy	
September 9	"Holding On (When Love Is Gone)"	L.T.D.	
September 16	"Holding On (When Love Is Gone)"	L.T.D.	
September 23	"Got to Get You into My Life"	Earth, Wind & Fire	
September 30	"One Nation Under a Groove (Part 1)"	Funkadelic	
October 7	"One Nation Under a Groove (Part 1)"	Funkadelic	
October 14	"One Nation Under a Groove (Part 1)"	Funkadelic	
October 21	"One Nation Under a Groove (Part 1)"	Funkadelic	
October 28	"One Nation Under a Groove (Part 1)"	Funkadelic	
November 4	"One Nation Under a Groove (Part 1)"	Funkadelic	
November 11	"I'm Every Woman"	Chaka Khan	
November 18	"I'm Every Woman"	Chaka Khan	
November 25	"I'm Every Woman"	Chaka Khan	
December 2	"Le Freak"	Chic	
December 9	"Le Freak"	Chic	
December 16	"Le Freak"	Chic	
December 23	"Le Freak"	Chic	
December 30	"Le Freak"	Chic	

== See also ==
- Billboard Year-End Hot Soul Singles of 1978
- List of Billboard Hot 100 number-one singles of 1978
