= Billboard Year-End Hot Soul Singles of 1978 =

American music chart

This is a list of Billboard magazine's Top Hot Soul Singles of 1978.

No.	Title	Artist(s)
1	"Serpentine Fire"	Earth, Wind & Fire
2	"Use ta Be My Girl"	The O'Jays
3	"Too Much, Too Little, Too Late"	Johnny Mathis and Deniece Williams
4	"Flash Light"	Parliament
5	"One Nation Under a Groove"	Funkadelic
6	"Our Love"	Natalie Cole
7	"Boogie Oogie Oogie"	A Taste of Honey
8	"You and I"	Rick James
9	"Close the Door"	Teddy Pendergrass
10	"Ffun"	Con Funk Shun
11	"The Closer I Get to You"	Roberta Flack with Donny Hathaway
12	"Get Off"	Foxy
13	"Take Me to the Next Phase"	The Isley Brothers
14	"Which Way Is Up"	Stargard
15	"Three Times a Lady"	Commodores
16	"Stuff Like That"	Quincy Jones
17	"Bootzilla"	Bootsy's Rubber Band
18	"It's You That I Need"	Enchantment
19	"Dance with Me"	Peter Brown
20	"Holding On (When Love Is Gone)"	L.T.D.
21	"Reaching for the Sky"	Peabo Bryson
22	"Jack and Jill"	Raydio
23	"The Groove Line"	Heatwave
24	"I Like Girls"	Fatback Band
25	"(Every Time I Turn Around) Back in Love Again"	L.T.D.
26	"Shame"	Evelyn "Champagne" King
27	"Dance, Dance, Dance (Yowsah, Yowsah, Yowsah)"	Chic
28	"Daylight and Darkness"	Smokey Robinson
29	"Dance Across the Floor"	Jimmy "Bo" Horne
30	"Lovely Day"	Bill Withers
31	"Dukey Stick"	George Duke
32	"Stay"	Rufus and Chaka Khan
33	"Take Me I'm Yours"	Michael Henderson
34	"On Broadway"	George Benson
35	"Shake and Dance with Me"	Con Funk Shun
36	"Annie Mae"	Natalie Cole
37	"Let Me Party with You"	Bunny Sigler
38	"Got to Get You into My Life"	Earth, Wind & Fire
39	"Get on Up"	Tyrone Davis
40	"Always and Forever"	Heatwave
41	"Love Me Right"	Denise LaSalle
42	"Galaxy"	War
43	"Shout It Out"	B. T. Express
44	"Am I Losing You"	The Manhattans
45	"Riding High"	Faze-O
46	"Runaway Love"	Linda Clifford
47	"Stayin' Alive"	Bee Gees
48	"Reach for It"	George Duke
49	"Victim"	Candi Staton
50	"Native New Yorker"	Odyssey

== See also ==
- 1978 in music
- Billboard Year-End Hot 100 singles of 1978
- List of Hot Soul Singles number ones of 1978
