= Touch (Con Funk Shun album) =

Studio album by Con Funk Shun
- Released: 1980
- Recorded: 1980 at The Automatt, San Francisco, California
- Genre: Funk, soul
- Label: Mercury Records
- Producer: Con Funk Shun

Con Funk Shun chronology
Spirit of Love (1980)	Touch (1980)	Con Funk Shun 7 (1981)

Professional ratings
Review scores
Source	Rating
Allmusic	3/5 stars

Touch is the seventh studio album by the funk/r&b band Con Funk Shun, released in 1980 on Mercury Records.

== Track listing ==
1. "Too Tight" (M. Cooper) 6:17
2. "Lady's Wild" (F. Pilate, G. Jackson, M. Cooper) 4:53
3. "Give Your Love To Me" (C. Martin) 4:58
4. "Pride And Glory" (F. Pilate, K. Fuller) 4:29
5. "Kidnapped!" (D. Thomas, M. Poole) 3:24
6. "Welcome Back To Love" (L. L. McCall, L. McCall, P. M. Allen) 3:55
7. "Touch" (F. Pilate, G. Jackson) 4:31
8. "Can't Say Goodbye" (F. Pilate) 4:19
9. "Play Widit" (F. Pilate, P. Harrell, P. W. Harrell) 4:18

== Personnel ==
- Michael Vernon Cooper - Lead Guitar, Rhythm Guitar, Lead and Background Vocals
- Louis A. McCall - Drums, Percussion, Vocals
- Felton C. Pilate - Slide & Valve Trombone, Keyboards, Synthesizer, Rhythm Guitar, Vocals
- Karl Fuller - Trumpet, Flugelhorn, Percussion, Vocals
- Paul Harrell - Soprano Saxophone, Tenor Saxophone, Alto Saxophone, Flute, Vocals
- Cedric Martin - Bass Guitar, Vocals
- Danny A. Thomas - Keyboards, Vocals
- Garry Jackson - Bass
- Carl Lockett - Lead Guitar
- Martin K. Riley - Trombone
- Marvin McFadden - Trumpet
- Sheila E, Pete Escovedo, Scott Roberts - Percussion
- Debra L. Henry - Background Vocals

== Charts ==
Chart (1981)	Peak position
US Billboard Top LPs & Tape	51
US Billboard Top Soul LPs	7

=== Singles ===
Year	Single	Chart positions		
Year	Single	US	US R&B	US Dance
1981	"Lady's Wild"	—	42	—
1981	"Too Tight"	40	8	25
