= Time Makes a Wine =

Single by Ardijah

from the album Ardijah
- B-side: "Jammin"
- Released: 1987
- Genre: Funk
- Length: 5:07
- Label: WEA
- Songwriter(s): Ryan Monga
- Producer(s): Ryan Monga

Ardijah singles chronology
"That's The Way" (1987)	"Time Makes a Wine" (1987)	"Watchin' U" (1988)

"Time Makes a Wine" is a song by New Zealand music group Ardijah. It was released through WEA in 1987 as the third and final single from their debut album Ardijah (1987), reaching the top 50 of the New Zealand charts. The song was featured in the 1986 film Queen City Rocker alongside Ardijah themselves.

== Release ==
The release of "Time Makes a Wine" was accompanied by a partially animated music video which received airplay on MTV in Australia, though the song did not chart outside of New Zealand. Irene Cara wanted to record a reworked version of the track but these plans did not come to fruition; it was later reworked by Ardijah themselves and included with the release of the group's third album, Time (1999).

== Track listing ==
7-inch New Zealand single

1. "Time Makes a Wine" (Ryan Monga)
2. "Jammin" (Monga)

== Personnel ==
Credits adapted from single sleeve.

- Betty-Anne Monga – lead vocals
- Ryan Monga – arrangements, backing vocals, production
- Tony 'T' Nogotautama – backing vocals

== Charts ==
Chart (1988)	Peak position
New Zealand (Recorded Music NZ)	41
