= To the Max =

To the Max may refer to:

- To the Max (Con Funk Shun album), 1982
- To the Max!, a 1992 album by Max Roach
- To the Max, 1991 album by Mentors
- "To the Max" (song), a 2017 song by DJ Khaled
- To the Max (film), a 2026 Spanish drama film

== See also ==
- Jade to the Max, a 1992 album by Jade
- "Homer to the Max", a 1999 episode of The Simpsons
- Michael Jordan to the Max, a 2000 IMAX documentary film
