= After Last Night =

Single by Silk Sonic, Thundercat and Bootsy Collins

from the album An Evening with Silk Sonic
- Released: July 5, 2022
- Studio: Shampoo Press & Curl
- Genre: Funk; neo soul; R&B
- Length: 4:09
- Label: Aftermath; Atlantic
- Songwriters: Bruno Mars; Brandon Anderson; Dernst Emile II; James Fauntleroy; Stephen Bruner; Jonathan Yip; Ray Romulus; Jeremy Reeves; Ray Charles McCollough II
- Producers: Bruno Mars; D'Mile; The Stereotypes

Bruno Mars singles chronology
"Love's Train" (2022)	"After Last Night" (2022)	"Die with a Smile" (2024)

Anderson .Paak singles chronology
"Love's Train" (2022)	"After Last Night" (2022)	"Take a Chance" (2022)

Silk Sonic singles chronology
"Love's Train" (2022)	"After Last Night" (2022)

"After Last Night" is a song by American superduo Silk Sonic, which consists of Bruno Mars and Anderson .Paak, with Thundercat and Bootsy Collins, from their debut studio album, An Evening with Silk Sonic (2021). The song was written by Mars, .Paak, Thundercat, Dernst "D'Mile" Emile II, James Fauntleroy, Jonathan Yip, Ray Romulus, Jeremy Reeves, and Ray Charles McCollough II. The production was handled by Mars, D'Mile, Yip, Romulus, Reeves, and McCollough II, with the latter four credited as the Stereotypes. It was released to urban adult contemporary radio as the fifth single from the album in the United States on July 5, 2022, by Atlantic Records. The song is a funk, neo soul and R&B ballad about a man who was a player, changing his behavior for a woman with whom he is in love.

"After Last Night" received positive reviews from most music critics, who noted the sexiness and praised its composition. The song reached number 68 on the US Billboard Hot 100 and number 17 on the Hot R&B/Hip-Hop Songs chart in 2021. In the following year, upon its single release, the song reached the top spot of the Billboard Adult R&B Songs chart; this led An Evening with Silk Sonic to become the second album with four number-one singles on the chart, tying with Toni Braxton's self-titled studio album (1993). Mars and .Paak also sang it during the concert residency, An Evening with Silk Sonic at Park MGM (2022).

== Background and release ==
Bruno Mars and Anderson .Paak met in 2017, while touring together on the European leg of Mars' 24K Magic World Tour (2017–18). The two were in the studio with Nile Rodgers and Guy Lawrence of Disclosure. In late February 2021, Mars and .Paak announced on social media the formation of their new band Silk Sonic. They revealed the artwork for their debut studio album, An Evening with Silk Sonic (2021) and announced the release of the first single on March 5, 2021.

Mars spoke about "After Last Night" to Apple Music: "That one got a lot of Bootsy on it. And my boy Thundercat came in and blessed us." He furthered that "everything was built to be played live, so that song is one of those we can keep going for 10 minutes". "After Last Night" was released on July 5, 2022, to US urban adult contemporary radio stations by Atlantic Records as the fifth single from An Evening with Silk Sonic (2021).

== Production ==
"After Last Night" was written by Mars, Brandon Anderson, Dernst Emile II, James Fauntleroy, Stephen Bruner, Jonathan Yip, Ray Romulus, Jeremy Reeves, and Ray McCullough II. Its production was handled by Mars, D'Mile, and the latter four as the Stereotypes. Mars played guitar, while D'Mile also played the same instrument, piano, and Rhodes piano. Ella Feingold played additional guitars, while Krystal Miles sang background vocals. Thundercat played the bass guitar and provided guest vocals alongside Bootsy Collins. Glenn Fischbach played cello, Jonathan Kim and Yoshihiko Nakano were on the viola, and Ron Kerber played the flute. Emma Kummrow, Luigi Mazzocchi, Natasha Colkett, Blake Espy, Tess Varley, and Chris Jusell played violin. Larry Gold did the arrangement and conducting of the strings at Milkboy Studios, Philadelphia, Pennsylvania, with Jeff Chestek recording them. Collins's vocals were recorded by Tobe Donohue at Rehab Studio in Cincinnati, Ohio. Reeves and Charles Moniz played percussion, while Alex Resoagli played the cabasa. The latter two also engineered and recorded the song at Shampoo Press & Curl Studios. Serban Ghenea mixed "After Last Night" at MixStar Studios in Virginia Beach, while John Hanes served as the mix engineer and Bryce Bordone as the mixing assistant. The song was mastered by Randy Merrill at Sterling Sound in New York City.

== Composition ==
"After Last Night"
A 24-second sample of "After Last Night", where Silk Sonic sing a portion of the chorus which features Collins's "spoken word".

Musically, "After Last Night" is a funk, neo soul, and R&B slow jam. Its instrumentation features a "subtle" electric guitar and there is a key change towards the end of the song. It starts with a "sensual spoken performance" by Krystal Miles and as she talks, Thundercat is playing the bass and singing "angelically" in the background. His singing has been described as "tender ooos" that are "the sonic equivalent of a rose-colored scarf over a bedside lamp". At one point, both Mars and .Paak replace Thundercat, both singing about the women they have fallen in love with. As the song goes on, Collins provides amusing lyrics and "swanky spoken word" to complement the song's lyrics. The lyrics describe a woman who is "sweet-sticky/thick and pretty" and able to make a "player try on monogamy". Furthermore, Mars and .Paak affirm they will leave their "player lifestyle" following a pleasurable date. The latter also says he will leave "the velvet smoking jackets and giant sunglasses". He throws away his phone, singing in the second verse, "If I still had my phone I'd call every girl I know/And tell them goodbye", a detail which is added by Mars's "harmonies on the last syllable".

"After Last Night" is set in the key of C minor with a tempo of 71 beats per minute. The vocal ranges span from the low note of G4 to a high note of F6. Jem Aswad, writing for Variety, described "After Last Night" as "a bedroom ballad with some heavy female breathing and pillow talk". In a similar view, The Harvard Crimson's Eugene Ye found the sensuality embedded in the song. Andy Kellman from AllMusic felt similarities between the composition of the song and the Lonely Island's "Dick in a Box" (2009) infused with a "Bootsy-style fantasy sleaze". The lyrics were compared by him to "The Hunter Gets Captured by the Game" (1966) by the Marvelettes. Paste's Candace McDuffie compared the song to the "early-'90s throwback jams a la Mint Condition and Jodeci". Jon Dolan, for Rolling Stone, affirmed the "stretched-out grooves" of "After Last Night" are reminiscent of earlier music that the listener expects to hear Teddy Pendergrass at the beginning of the verse.

== Reception ==
Most reviewers gave "After Last Night" positive reviews. Ross Scarano, commenting in Pitchfork, called "After Last Night" one of the highlights of An Evening with Silk Sonic, due to its "slathering elevated technique—all those key changes—with satisfying molten cheese". Exclaim!'s A. Harmony found the track to be "seductive" and that Mars channels his charm while singing from "his gut". Similarly, Caleb Campbell of Under the Radar affirmed that "After Last Night" amplifies the seductiveness of Mars's "smooth lover-man persona". Sophie Williams from NME found moments of "gorgeously subtle flourishes" in the album, such as "the fluttering intake of breath ...around the mix on 'After Last Night'". Uproxx's Derrick Rossignol described the song as smooth[,] funky", and "chill". Kyle Eustice from HipHopDX praised the feature of Thundercat and Collins, writing that they "pepper the seductive track with their signature touches". Pat Carty, writing for Hot Press, described the single as "sexy" and credited Thundercat and Collins with the song's "horizontal relaxez-vous action". Gigwise's Alex Rigotti characterized the single as "glitzy, glamorous, and totally lovestruck" and a "sexy slow jam". Ye found the vocals and instrumentation "sexy". HotNewHipHop writer Joshua Robinson called the track "lush", while Roisin O'Connor from The Independent described it as "sultry". Aswad said the track is "steamy". In a mixed review for The New Yorker, Sheldon Pearce praised Sonic's "perfect synchronization" as their voices are indissoluble until their solo parts. Nevertheless, Pearce pointed out that "the figure outside the spotlight is always close behind with something to add". Joe Rivers from No Ripcord said the song was "the furthest Silk Sonic deviate from their rigid template", adding that Thundercat's "aqueous bassline" shows a "glimpse" of what the song could have been.

Following the release of An Evening with Silk Sonic in 2021, "After Last Night" debuted at number 68 on the US Billboard's Hot 100. It also entered the US Hot R&B/Hip-Hop Songs chart at number 17. The song charted at number 92 on the Canadian Hot 100 and was certified platinum by Music Canada (MC). It debuted at number eight on the New Zealand Hot Singles, which acts as an extension of NZ Top 40 Singles Chart, and was certified platinum by Recorded Music NZ (RMNZ). It also peaked at number 78 on the Billboard Global 200. In 2022, following its single release, "After Last Night" topped the Adult R&B Songs chart, becoming the fourth single of Sonic's debut album to do so. This achievement led An Evening with Silk Sonic to become the second album with four number-one singles on the chart, tying with Toni Braxton's self-titled studio album (1993).

== Personnel ==
Credits adapted from the liner notes of An Evening with Silk Sonic:

- Bruno Mars – vocals, songwriting, production, guitar
- Anderson .Paak – vocals, songwriting, drums
- Thundercat – vocals, songwriting, bass
- Bootsy Collins – vocals
- Krystal Miles – background vocals
- James Fauntleroy – songwriting
- Johnathan Yip – songwriting
- Ray Romulus – songwriting
- Jeremy Reeves – songwriting
- Ray McCullough II – songwriting
- D'Mile – songwriting, production, piano, guitar, rhodes
- The Stereotypes – production
- Ella Feingold – additional guitars
- Glenn Fischbach – cello
- Jonathan Kim – viola
- Yoshihiko Nakano – viola
- Ron Kerber – flute
- Blake Espy – violin
- Chris Jusell – violin
- Tess Varley – violin
- Emma Kummrow – violin
- Luigi Mazzocchi – violin
- Natasha Colkett – violin
- Jeremy Reeves – percussion
- Larry Gold – strings conduction, arrangement
- Jeff Chestek – strings recording
- Tobe Donohue – vocal recording of Bootsy Collins
- Charles Moniz – recording, engineering, percussion
- Alex Resoagli – engineering assistant, cabasa
- Serban Ghenea – mixing
- John Hanes – mixing engineering
- Bryce Bordone – mixing assistant
- Randy Merrill – mastering

== Charts and certifications ==
List of chart positions
Chart (2021)	Peak position
Canada Hot 100 (Billboard)	92
Global 200 (Billboard)	78
New Zealand Hot Singles (RMNZ)	8
Portugal (AFP)	104
UK Hip Hop/R&B (Official Charts)	20
UK Singles Sales (Official Charts)	90
US Billboard Hot 100	68
US Hot R&B/Hip-Hop Songs (Billboard)	17

=== Certifications ===
List of certifications
Region	Certification	Certified units/sales
Canada (Music Canada)	Platinum	80,000^{‡}
New Zealand (RMNZ)	Platinum	30,000^{‡}
^{‡} Sales+streaming figures based on certification alone.
