= Stargard (album) =

Studio album by Stargard
- Released: 1978
- Recorded: 1977
- Studio: Sound City (Van Nuys); Whitfield Sound (Hollywood)
- Genre: R&B, soul, disco
- Label: MCA Records
- Producer: Norman Whitfield

Stargard chronology
| Stargard (1978) | What You Waitin' For (1978) |

Professional ratings
Review scores
| Source | Rating |
|---|---|
| AllMusic | 3/5 stars |

Stargard is the self-titled debut album of the girl group Stargard released in 1978 by MCA Records. The album reached No. 12 on the Billboard 200 chart and No. 26 on the Top R&B Albums chart.

== Overview ==
The album was produced by Mark Davis.

== Singles ==
The song, "Which Way Is Up" reached No. 1 on the Billboard Hot R&B Singles chart, No. 12 on the Billboard Dance Club chart and No. 21 on the Hot 100. It peaked at No. 19 on the UK Singles Chart.

== Track listing ==
Side one
| No. | Title | Writer(s) | Length |
|---|---|---|---|
| 1. | "Three Girls" | Rochelle Runnells, Janice Williams, Debra Anderson | 3:51 |
| 2. | "Smile" | Rochelle Runnells | 3:18 |
| 3. | "Love Is So Easy" | Rochelle Runnells | 3:37 |
| 4. | "Don't Change" | Chuck Jackson, Marvin Yancy | 3:13 |

Side two
| No. | Title | Writer(s) | Length |
|---|---|---|---|
| 5. | "Theme Song from 'Which Way Is Up'" | Norman Whitfield | 7:02 |
| 6. | "The Force" | Norman Whitfield | 3:30 |
| 7. | "I'll Always Love You" | Mark Davis | 3:30 |
| 8. | "Disco Rufus" | Michael Nash, Mark Davis | 3:18 |
