= Watchin' U =

Single by Ardijah

from the album Take A Chance
- B-side: "Which Way Is Up"
- Released: 1988
- Studio: Mascot (Auckland)
- Genre: Pop; funk
- Length: 3:53
- Label: WEA
- Songwriter: Ryan Monga
- Producer: Ryan Monga

Ardijah singles chronology
"Time Makes a Wine" (1987)	"Watchin' U" (1988)	"Take Me" (1989)

"Watchin' U" is a song by New Zealand music group Ardijah, released through WEA in 1988. It served as the lead single from Take A Chance (1988), the group's reissue of their self-titled 1987 debut album, and became a No. 3 hit in New Zealand.

== Background and development ==
In the aftermath of the release of Ardijah, their 1987 debut album, Ardijah experienced internal tensions that culminated in the departure of keyboardist Simon Lynch and guitarist Tony Nogotautama. Following this, the group's musical director Ryan Monga made the decision to reissue the album with a new cover, the title Take A Chance, and the inclusion of three bonus tracks: "Watchin' U," its B-side "Which Way Is Up" (a Stargard cover), and the reissue's title track.

"Watchin' U" was recorded at Mascot Studios in Auckland. Though Ardijah is primarily a funk group, the song was described by New Zealand journalists upon its release as a pop song with some underlying funk elements, with The Press referring to the track as the group's "most commercial release yet."

== Track listing ==
7-inch New Zealand single

1. "Watchin' U" (Ryan Monga)
2. "Which Way Is Up" (Norman Whitfield)

== Personnel ==
Credits adapted from single sleeve.

- Trevor Collings – backing vocals, guitar
- Victor Grbic – engineering
- Betty-Anne Monga – lead vocals
- Ryan Monga – arrangements, backing vocals, bass, guitar, keyboards, production, programming

== Charts ==
=== Weekly charts ===
Chart (1988)	Peak position
New Zealand (Recorded Music NZ)	3

=== Year-end charts ===
Chart (1988)	Position
New Zealand (Recorded Music NZ)	7
