= Electric Lady =

Electric Lady may refer to:

- Electric Lady Studios, a recording studio opened by Jimi Hendrix
- Electric Lady (Elkie Brooks album), 2005
- Electric Lady (Con Funk Shun album), 1985
- The Electric Lady, a 2013 album by Janelle Monaé
  - "Electric Lady" (song), the album's title track
- "Electric Lady", a song by Tesla Boy from Modern Thrills

== See also ==
- Electric Ladyland, an album by the Jimi Hendrix Experience
- Electric Landlady, an album by Kirsty MacColl
