= Loveshine =

Studio album by Con Funk Shun
- Released: 1978
- Recorded: 1978
- Genre: Funk, soul
- Length: 41:06
- Label: Mercury
- Producer: Con Funk Shun

Con Funk Shun chronology
Secrets (1977)	Loveshine (1978)	Candy (1979)

Professional ratings
Review scores
Source	Rating
Allmusic	3/5 stars

Loveshine is the fifth album by funk band Con Funk Shun, released in 1978 on Mercury Records. This album has been certified Gold in the US by the RIAA.

== Critical reception ==
Amy Hanson of Allmusic, in a 3/5 star review, commented "With some endearingly mellow grooves, California's Con Funk Shun continued to capitalize on their easy blend of soulful funk and disco across 1978's Loveshine...With a plethora of instrumentation to complete the picture, including guest percussion from Sheila Escovedo, who would later emerge as the Prince protégée Sheila E, Loveshine is a gem of its era. And while purists may best love their early-'70s Soul Children Wattstax-era material, Loveshine kicked off their next incarnation in style, and gave the band the momentum that kept them firmly in the charts for nearly a decade."

== Tracklisting ==
No.	Title	Writer(s)	Length
1.	"So Easy"	Michael Cooper	04:30
2.	"Magic Woman"	Michael Cooper	04:15
3.	"Make It Last"	Felton C. Pirate II	05:01
4.	"Loveshine"	Felton C. Pirate II	04:47
5.	"When the Feeling's Right"	Michael Cooper	05:37
6.	"I Think I Found the Answer"	Louis McCall/D. Thomas/Danny "Sweet Man" Thomas	04:30
7.	"Wanna Be There"	Felton C. Pilate II	04:24
8.	"Can't Go Away"	Skip Scarborough/A. Wilson/Arthur Wilson	04:01

== Charts ==
Year	Chart positions	
Year	US Pop	US R&B
1978	32	10
