= I'm Your Playmate =

Studio album by Suavé
- Released: 1988
- Studio: Newberry Sound (Boston, MA)
- Genre: R&B
- Length: 46:04
- Label: Capitol
- Producer: Suavé; Dwayne Omarr

Suavé chronology
I'm Your Playmate (1988)	To the Maxx (1991)

Singles from I'm Your Playmate
- 1. "My Girl" Released: 1988; 2. "Shake Your Body" Released: 1988; 3. "Don't Rush" Released: 1988

Professional ratings
Review scores
Source	Rating
AllMusic	2/5 stars

I'm Your Playmate is the debut studio album by American R&B singer-songwriter Suavé. It was released in 1988 through Capitol Records. Recorded at Newberry Sound in Boston, it was produced by the artist himself in association with Dwayne Omarr.

In the United States, the album peaked at number 101 on Billboard 200 and number 26 on the Top R&B/Hip-Hop Albums charts. Its lead single, a cover of the Temptations' "My Girl", made it to number 20 on the Billboard Hot 100 and number 3 on the Hot R&B/Hip-Hop Songs charts. The second single off of the album, "Shake Your Body", peaked at number 46 on the Hot R&B/Hip-Hop Songs chart.

== Track listing ==
All tracks are written by Wayman Anderson, except track 4, which was written by William Robinson and Ronald White.

No.	Title	Length
1.	"Now That I Fell in Love"	4:42
2.	"Shake Your Body"	4:32
3.	"Playmate"	4:12
4.	"My Girl"	5:36
5.	"Love Triangle"	4:30
6.	"Don't Rush"	4:50
7.	"Stop Acting Ill"	4:23
8.	"B and E of the Heart"	4:30
9.	"Back Stabber"	3:38
10.	"I Wanna Please You"	4:30
Total length:		46:04

== Personnel ==
- Waymond Anderson – lead and background vocals, producer
- Dwayne Omarr – background vocals, associate producer
- Melanie Andrews – background vocals
- Sherrie Young – background vocals
- Trevor Woods – guitar
- Paul Arnold – recording, mixing
- Bruce Forest – mixing
- Eddy Schreyer – mastering
- Wayne Edwards – executive producer
- Todd Gray – photography
- Jonathan Clark – management

== Charts ==
Chart (1988)	Peak position
US Billboard 200	101
US Top R&B/Hip-Hop Albums (Billboard)	26
