= Stuff Like That =

Single by Quincy Jones featuring Chaka Khan and Ashford & Simpson

from the album Sounds...and Stuff Like That!!
- B-side: "There's a Train' Leavin"
- Released: June 1978
- Genre: Disco
- Length: 3:05 (radio edit); 6:16 (album version)
- Label: A&M
- Songwriters: Ashford & Simpson; Steve Gadd; Eric Gale; Quincy Jones; Ralph MacDonald; Richard Tee
- Producer: Quincy Jones

Quincy Jones featuring Chaka Khan and Ashford & Simpson singles chronology
"Roots Medley" (1977)	"Stuff Like That" (1978)	"Ai No Corrida" (1981)

Licensed audio
- "Stuff Like That" on YouTube

"Stuff Like That" is a hit song with music and lyrics written by Quincy Jones, Ashford & Simpson, Steve Gadd, Eric Gale, Ralph MacDonald and Richard Tee. The song was originally an instrumental rhythm track. Jones worked on the track with Ashford & Simpson, Chaka Khan and studio musicians Gadd, Gale, MacDonald and Tee to turn it into a single. Ashford & Simpson and Khan featured as vocalists while George Young was playing alto saxophone. The song was included on Jones' 1978 album Sounds...And Stuff Like That!. The single spent one week at number one on the R&B singles chart, for the week ending 1 July 1978, and peaked at number 21 on the Billboard Hot 100 singles chart.

For his 1995 album Q's Jook Joint Jones modernized the song. This time vocals were provided by Ashford & Simpson, Khan, Brandy, Charlie Wilson and Ray Charles while Greg Phillinganes was playing keyboards. In 2002 the song was featured in a Peter Lindbergh-directed Gap TV commercial starring Will Kemp, this time credited to QJ's Jook Joint and Brothers Johnson.

== Charts ==
Chart performance for "Stuff Like That"
Chart (1978)	Peak position
Canada Top Singles (RPM)	23
Netherlands (Dutch Top 40)	26
UK Singles (Official Charts)	34
US Billboard Hot 100	21
US Hot Soul Singles (Billboard)	1
