= Dale Chung =

Dale Edward Chung
- Born: August 31, 1974 (age 51); Oakland, U.S.
- Origin: Berkeley, California
- Genres: Pop, R&B, Jazz, World music, Latin
- Occupation(s): Producer, Musician, Singer, Actor, Director, Production Sound Mixer, Sound Engineer
- Instrument(s): Percussion, Keyboards, Vocals

Dale Edward Chung is a percussionist, singer, songwriter, actor, director, producer, production sound mixer, post sound engineer. He has a Latin Grammy Award for his work on the album Buenos Diaz (2019). He has a Latin Grammy nomination for Paseo Lunar (2020) as a member and producer of Lucky Diaz and the Family Jam Band (The Lucky Band). In 2024, Chung received a Grammy award nomination for Best Global Music Performance for his work as a featured artist on "Kashira" by Masa Takumi.

== Early life and education ==
Dale Edward Chung is a Chinese American. Born in Oakland and raised in Berkeley, California. His grandmother was a welder during World War II in Richmond California, among women known as "Rosie the Riveters." Chung's ancestors were among the founding Chinese families in the Monterey Bay area in the 1860s.

Chung's music journey began when he took piano lessons at 14 and then conga lessons at 15. While attending Berkeley High School, he became a conga player in jazz band. He also took Afro Haitian dance classes. After high school he attended Cal State Hayward to study marketing.

== Career ==
Chung was member of Con Funk Shun and performed on the album More Than Love that reached the Top 20 on the Billboard Adult R&B Chart.

Chung was featured in the ABS-CBN feature film Labyu with an Accent starring Coco Martin and Jody Sta. Maria making a guest appearance as himself. His song “The Beautiful One” is part of the soundtrack for the film. In 2024, Chung was nominated for a Grammy Award for Best Global Music Performance for his work as a Featured Artist on the song "Kashira" by Masa Takumi.
