= Love's Train =

1982 single by Con Funk Shun

Song by Con Funk Shun

from the album To the Max
- A-side: "You Are the One"
- Released: 1982
- Genre: R&B; funk; quiet storm
- Length: 5:12
- Label: Mercury
- Songwriters: Michael Cooper; Felton C. Pilate II
- Producer: Con Funk Shun

Audio
- "Love's Train" on YouTube

"Love's Train" is a song by American R&B and funk band Con Funk Shun from their tenth studio album, To the Max (1982). The song was written by Con Funk Shun frontmen Michael Cooper and Felton C. Pilate II, and produced by the band. Cooper wrote the song to a music track created by Pilate with different lyrics. It is an R&B, funk and quiet storm song that includes a "steering bass guitar", "glittering keys", and "synth-centric flair of '80s R&B". Lyrically, the song is based on a real-life love triangle, involving Cooper, Pilate, and a woman they were both seeing. Since its release, the song has received praise from music critics, with the majority commending the band's vocals.

While the song was never released as a single, it has since become an audience favorite and a signature song for the band. The song has since appeared on multiple compilation albums, and has been re-recorded and remastered in 2010. The song was covered by Dru Hill on their 1996 eponymous album and by Silk Sonic in 2022, as a commemorative song for Valentine's Day; the latter's version peaked at number 47 on the Billboard Hot R&B/Hip-Hop Songs.

== Background ==
During an interview with Vibe, Felton Pilate affirmed that he wrote a song called "Baby Please Come Home", the original version of "Love's Train", for the To the Max album. After Michael Cooper heard the song, he asked for a copy of the track without the original lyrics. Cooper decided to create new lyrics for the song, which made the final cut of the track. Initially, Pilate didn't enjoy the new lyrics and it "took about a week before the other group members" convinced him. Pilate explained, that the "original version was a softer, more laid-back thing", while Cooper's version "was full of hard, gritty emotion".

Usually, Con Funk Shun would listen to the finished songs together and they voted the songs they wanted to submit to Mercury Records. Initially, they heard Pilate's original track, along with other songs, and only afterward Cooper's reworked version was played. At this point, they affirmed having already listened to the song, but Cooper said that his version was different. Only "halfway through the song" the band noticed the lyrics concerned with "what had happened between Pilate and Cooper". When they counted the votes, "Love's Train" received the most. Later, Pilate wanted to remove his music, which, according to Cooper "would've killed the song." Danny Thomas, Con Funk Shun's keyboard player, told Pilate he was crazy because the song was a hit. Pilate said he was sorry, then "they all began laughing".

== Composition and lyrics ==
Musically, "Love's Train" is a R&B, funk, and quiet storm ballad. Its instrumentation includes a "steering bass guitar", "glittering keys", and "synth-centric flair of '80s R&B". The song was written by Cooper and Pilate II, and produced by Con Funk Shun. It was mastered by Chris Bellman at Allen Zentz in Los Angeles.

"Love's Train" was written about "a love triangle Cooper and Pilate found themselves in, both lovelorn and yearning". The songwriters have acknowledged there was no awkwardness during the writing sessions. One day, a young lady showed up at the studio in San Francisco and Pilate "moved on her quickly". After a month of relationship, she told Cooper that she wanted him, instead of Pilate. At this point, Cooper thought the woman had left Pilate, but she was "juggling" both of them. One night Cooper showed up at her apartment and she was with Pilate. The former told Pilate "[i]f by chance you let me come up, we can talk about this"; these words would become the bridge in "Love's Train". Cooper decided to go home and poured out his sorrow into the lyrics of a song, which started "warm night, can't sleep, too hurt, too weak, gotta call her up". Cooper wrote the song to a music track created by Pilate, but with different lyrics.

== Reception and promotion ==
According to AllMusic's Craig Lytle, "the romance in the song is manifested by the guitar and piano rhythms". Lytle, affirmed the lead tenor, performed by Cooper, was "husky and smooth". Matt Doria from NME described Con Funk Shun's vocals as "ultra-suave and honeyed". Since its release, "Love's Train" has become an audience favorite and a signature song for the band. "Love's Train" was included as the seventh track on Con Funk Shun's tenth studio album To the Max, released in 1982 by Mercury Records. The original recording was never released as a single. "Love's Train" has appeared on numerous compilation albums, including The Best of Con Funk Shun (1993), 20th Century Masters - The Millennium Collection: The Best of Con Funk Shun (2002), and Touch/Con Funk Shun 7/To the Max (2011). The song was re-recorded and remastered in 2010. Con Funk Shun first performed "Love's Train" on Soul Train in 1983 and later for Funky Nights: United We Funk All Stars, which was released on a DVD in 2003. In 1996, the song was covered by Dru Hill on their eponymous album. After listening to Dru Hill's cover, Pilate was "surprised and honored."

== Silk Sonic version ==
"Love's Train"

Single by Silk Sonic

from the album An Evening with Silk Sonic
- Released: February 14, 2022
- Studio: Shampoo Press & Curl
- Genre: Funk; soul
- Length: 5:07
- Label: Aftermath; Atlantic
- Songwriters: Michael Cooper; Felton C. Pilate II
- Producers: Bruno Mars; D'Mile

Bruno Mars singles chronology
"Smokin out the Window" (2021)	"Love's Train" (2022)	"After Last Night" (2022)

Anderson .Paak singles chronology
"Smokin out the Window" (2021)	"Love's Train" (2022)	"After Last Night" (2022)

Silk Sonic singles chronology
"Smokin out the Window" (2021)	"Love's Train" (2022)	"After Last Night" (2022)

Official audio
- "Love's Train" on YouTube

The American superduo Silk Sonic, which consists of Bruno Mars and Anderson .Paak, recorded a version of "Love's Train" as a commemorative song for Valentine's Day. It was released as the album's fourth single on February 14, 2022, by Aftermath Entertainment and Atlantic Records. "Love's Train" was later added to An Evening with Silk Sonic on streaming services and included on the webstore exclusive vinyl recording. The soul and funk song was produced by Mars and D'Mile. "Love's Train" was well received by music critics, who praised Mars and .Paak's vocals and commitment to the original version. To promote "Love's Train", Silk Sonic performed it at the 2022 Billboard Music Awards. It won Outstanding Duo, Group or Collaboration (Traditional) at the 54th NAACP Image Awards. It was certified gold by Music Canada (MC).

=== Background ===
Felton Pilate confessed that the group was surprised by the Silk Sonic's cover, as not only the latter didn't contact them, but Con Funk Shun's publishing company didn't tell Pilate about Silk Sonic's intention to record a cover of "Love's Train". He was grateful and humbled that Silk Sonic chose their song. Regarding the cover's production Pilate felt that Mars and .Paak were able "to keep the original emotion, and the energy behind it". He furthered, that Silk Sonic and D'Mile studied the original song in order to recapture its authenticity, and added some new sounds that Con Funk Shun could have done if they could cover their track.

On February 14, 2022, Mars announced the release of Con Funk Shun's "Love's Train" cover, via Instagram. He also affirmed that it is one of his and .Paak's favorite songs to play and cover. Paak wrote on his Instagram account, "We wanna dedicate this to that special someone!" In a similar publication, Silk Sonic typed on Twitter, "We love this song so much we wanted to sing it for y'all". A press release described the track as one of Mars and .Paak’s "favorite songs".

=== Production ===
"Love's Train" was written by Michael Cooper and Felton C. Pilate II. The cover version was produced by Mars and D'Mile. Kameron Whalum sang background vocals and played the trombone. John Fossit played the piano, while Maurice Brown was in charge of the trumpet and Dwayne Dugger played the sax. Jamareo Artis played the bass, Mateus Asato the guitar fuzz, and Ella Feingold the rhythm guitar. Jimmy King played the tambourine as Eric Hernandez was in charge of the congas. Emma Kummrow, Luigi Mazzocchi, and Blake Espy played violin with Gared Crawford, Charlene Kwas, and Ghislaine Fleischmann. Jonathan Kim and Yoshihiko Nakano were on the viola. Larry Gold, with assistant Steve Tirpak, arranged and conducted the strings at Milkboy Studios, while Cody Cichowski recorded the strings. Charles Moniz, with engineering assistant Alex Resoagli, engineered and recorded the song at Shampoo Press & Curl Studios. Serban Ghenea mixed "Love's Train" at MixStar Studios in Virginia Beach, with mix engineer Bryce Bordone. It was mastered by Randy Merrill at Sterling Sound, NYC.

=== Composition ===
"Love's Train"
A 26-second sample of the song features analog production and Silk Sonic singing the chorus line.

Musically, the "Love's Train" cover is a "silky and smooth" 1970s funk and soul song. It is composed in the key of A major with a tempo of 70 beats per minute. The singers' vocal ranges span from the low note of E4 to a high note of E6. According to Rolling Stone's Larisha Paul, Mars and D'Mile "added the bounce of Silk Sonic's signature groove, picking up the pace of the original". The cover version kept most of the original instrumentation. However, the 1980s R&B synths were replaced with "balmy horns and analogue production", centered around the 1970s decade.

Andy Bustard, writing for HipHopDX, said the duo changed "the '80s production for lush, analog instrumentation that would sound at home in the previous decade". Bustard added that they "apply a fresh sonic coat to the love ballad". Uproxx's Aaron Williams described the bass as "buzzing" and the horns as "soaring".

=== Release ===
"Love's Train" was released on February 14, 2022, by Aftermath Entertainment and Atlantic Records as a commemorative song for Valentine's Day. On March 18, Warner Music Group (WMG) issued the track for radio airplay in Italy. On April 21, 2022, Billboard reported that "Love's Train" was the album's fourth single, with no official date of release in the United States. In February, the song was added to Silk Sonic's debut album An Evening with Silk Sonic on digital and streaming services and it was also included on the webstore exclusive vinyl recording.

=== Reception ===
"Love's Train" was met with acclaim from music critics. The song was included on Under the Radar's Songs of the Week on February 18, 2022, as part of the Honorable Mentions. Eddie Fu, writing for Consequence, dubbed the song as Silk Sonic's latest "soundtrack for...ahem adult activities". Fu commented that both Mars and .Paak stayed "true" to Con Funk Shun's original and "easily slip into their seductive role". Similarly, Doria also found Silk Sonic to be "largely faithful to the five-minute jam". Doria called Silk Sonic's version "expectedly sensual...soulful and groove-laden". Billboard's Jason Lipshutz compared the best songs on An Evening with Silk Sonic to the cover version of "Love's Train", saying "the homage pops with modern production and two self-assured vocal performances".

Bustar affirmed that "Silk Sonic's rendition stays faithful" to the original version. Bustar praised the merge of Mars "soaring falsetto", and .Paak's "raspy timber" as it "adds more sensuality to the Valentine's Day jam." Jordan Darville of The Fader commented that while "the aesthetic of Silk Sonic may seem tongue-in-cheek, the music and the duo's appreciation for the era they're channeling certainly isn't". In a mixed review, Uproxx's Williams called Silk Sonic's vocals "velvety", and noted that despite being a love song, "it's as much about the messiness as anything on their debut album".

"Love's Train" peaked at number 47 on the Billboard Hot R&B/Hip-Hop Songs. It failed to reach the Billboard Hot 100, though entered the Bubbling Under Hot 100, which acts as an extension of the former chart, peaking at number 111. "Love's Train" spent thirteen weeks on the top spot of the Billboard Adult R&B Songs chart. It won Outstanding Duo, Group or Collaboration (Traditional) at the 54th NAACP Image Awards. It was certified gold by Music Canada (MC).

=== Live performances ===
Silk Sonic performed the song live at the 2022 Billboard Music Awards. They were joined on stage by a band and two backup singers, both wearing "maroon leisure suits", while the band used "complementing outfits". The performance included a "fully choreographed routine" by Silk Sonic and everyone on stage. It was well received by critics. Entertainment Tonight's Zach Seemayer‍ dubbed Silk Sonic's performance as one of the show highlights, "flawless '70s crooning that is every bit as smooth as their name wound lead you to expect." Melissa Ruggieri writing for USA Today placed Silk Sonic's performance as the fifth-best of the show. Ruggieri noticed the "pelvic thrusts and Temptations-styled dancing". Austin Williams from Vibe commended Silk Sonic's singing and choreography. Starr Bowenbank of Billboard magazine praised "their smooth dance skills". The duo also sang "Love's Train" during the concert residency, An Evening with Silk Sonic at Park MGM (2022).

=== Personnel ===
Credits adapted from the liner notes of An Evening with Silk Sonic.

- Bruno Mars – vocals, production
- Anderson .Paak – vocals, drums
- Kameron Whalum – background vocals, trombone
- Michael Cooper – songwriting
- Felton C. Pilate II – songwriting
- D'Mile – production
- John Fossit – piano
- Maurice Brown – trumpet
- Dwayne Dugger – sax
- Jamareo Artis – bass
- Mateus Asato – guitar fuzz
- Ella Feingold – rhythm guitar
- Jimmy King – tambourine
- Eric Hernandez – congas
- Larry Gold – strings conduction, arrangement
- Steve Tirpak – arrangement assistant
- Cody Chicowski – strings recording
- Emma Kummrow – violin
- Luigi Mazzocchi – violin
- Blake Espy – violin
- Gared Crawford – violin
- Charlene Kwas – violin
- Ghislaine Fleischmann – violin
- Jonathan Kim – viola
- Yoshihiko Nakano – viola
- Glenn Fischbach – cello
- Charles Moniz – recording, engineering
- Alex Resoagli – engineering assistant
- Serban Ghenea – mixing
- Bryce Bordone – mixing engineering
- Randy Merrill – mastering

=== Charts and certifications ===
List of chart positions
Chart (2022)	Peak position
New Zealand Hot Singles (RMNZ)	18
US Bubbling Under Hot 100 (Billboard)	11
US Digital Song Sales (Billboard)	29
US Hot R&B/Hip-Hop Songs (Billboard)	47
US Radio Songs (Billboard)	50

List of certifications
Region	Certification	Certified units/sales
Canada (Music Canada)	Gold	40,000^{‡}
^{‡} Sales+streaming figures based on certification alone.

=== Release history ===
List of release history, showing region(s), date(s), format(s) and label(s)
Region	Date	Format(s)	Label(s)	Ref.
Various	February 14, 2022	Digital download; streaming	Aftermath; Atlantic	
Italy	March 18, 2022	Radio airplay	Warner	
