= Candy (Con Funk Shun album) =

Studio album by Con Funk Shun
- Released: April 25th, 1979
- Recorded: December, 1978–April, 1979 at The Automatt, San Francisco, California
- Genre: Funk; soul; R&B
- Label: Mercury
- Producer: Skip Scarborough; Con Funk Shun

Con Funk Shun chronology
Loveshine (1978)	Candy (1979)	Spirit of Love (1980)

Professional ratings
Review scores
Source	Rating
Allmusic	4/5 stars

Candy is the fifth album by American musical group Con Funk Shun, released on April 25th, 1979, by Mercury Records. This album has been certified Gold in the US by the RIAA.

== Critical reception ==
Alex Henderson of Allmusic, in a 4\5 star review, remarked "What a difference a few years can make. When Con Funk Shun joined the Mercury/Polygram roster with a self-titled LP in 1976, the Northern Californians were still finding their way. They weren't well known, and despite their tremendous potential, they had yet to make the transition from decent to excellent. But when Candy came out in 1979, Con Funk Shun had come to be regarded as funk royalty -- and deservedly so. Candy, which was the band's fourth album for Mercury, is a gem...Candy went down in history as one of Con Funk Shun's best albums, and it is isn't hard to understand why."

== Track listing ==
1. Fire When Ready – 1:43
2. Chase Me – 5:39
3. Not Ready – 5:16
4. Da Lady – 3:51
5. Candy – 5:13
6. (Let Me Put) Love On Your Mind – 6:08
7. Main Slice – 4:11
8. Images – 2:40

== Personnel ==
- Michael Vernon Cooper – Lead Guitar, Rhythm Guitar, Electric Sitar, Percussion, Lead and Background Vocals
- Louis A. McCall – Drums, Electronic Drums (Syn Drums), Percussion, Vocals
- Felton C. Pilate – Trombone, Electric Piano, Synthesizer, Trumpet, Percussion, Lead Vocals
- Karl Fuller – Trumpet, Flugelhorn, Trombone (Valve), Percussion, Vocals
- Paul Harrell – Soprano Saxophone, Tenor Saxophone, Flute, Percussion, Vocals
- Cedric Martin – Bass Guitar, Percussion, Lead Vocals
- Danny A. Thomas – Clavinet, Organ, Electric Piano, Synthesizer, Percussion, Vocals
- Skip Scarborough – Clavinet, Piano
- Sheila Escovedo – Timbales
- Jack Trotter, Michael Alexander – Trumpet
- Bill Summers – Congas
- Roger Glenn – Flute
- Terry Adams – Concertmaster
- Greg Blockman – MC

== Charts ==
Year	Chart positions	
Year	US Pop	US R&B
1979	46	7

=== Singles ===
Year	Single	US R&B
1979	"Chase Me"	4
1979	"(Let Me Put) Love On Your Mind"	24
1980	"Da Lady"	60
