= More Than Love (Con Funk Shun album) =

Studio album by Con Funk Shun
- Released: April 28, 2015
- Studios: Blackout Studios, Richmond, CA; Felstar Recording, Atlanta, GA; KC Pro Studios, Memphis, TN; Moton Production Studios, Stockton, CA; The Heavyweights Studio, Sherman Oaks, CA; The Soundfarm, Vacaville, CA; Wirl Wide Studios, Atlanta, GA
- Genres: Funk, soul
- Length: 55:09
- Label: Shanachie
- Producer: Con Funk Shun

Con Funk Shun chronology
Burnin' Love (1986)	More Than Love (2015)

More Than Love is the fourteenth studio album by American funk band Con Funk Shun, released on April 28, 2015 on Shanachie Records. This album peaked at No. 20 on the US Billboard Top R&B Albums chart.

== Critical reception ==
Kimberly C. Roberts of the Philadelphia Tribune wrote, "the band’s first new studio album in more than 20 years, features a quieter, gentler ConFunkShun that updates its signature sound without sounding forced. It utilizes the sparse production that is prevalent in today’s tracks, pulling back on the band’s trademark raucous horn licks of the 1970s...it’s the perfect disc to roll with in the car this summer."

== Tracklisting ==
No.	Title	Writer(s)	Length
1.	"Your Night"	Wirlie Morris	04:00
2.	"More Than Love"	Kirk Clayton/Michael Cooper	04:35
3.	"Dance N With a Grown Man"	Ellis Gino Blacknell/Kirk Clayton/Michael Cooper	03:46
4.	"It's Time"		04:45
5.	"No Place Like Love"		04:00
6.	"Big Girl"	Ellis Gino Blacknell/Michael Cooper	04:18
7.	"I Miss You"	Tim Stewart	03:54
8.	"Say Yo"	Kirk Clayton/Michael Cooper	03:46
9.	"Move On Up"	Curtis Mayfield	04:14
10.	"Taboo"		04:08
11.	"It's On Tonight"	Ellis Gino Blacknell/Michael Cooper	03:23
12.	"Make Me Over"	Ellis Gino Blacknell/Michael Cooper	04:29
13.	"Once I Get In It"	Tim Riley	03:57
14.	"Nite-Liters"	Ellis Gino Blacknell/Michael Cooper	01:54

== Charts ==
Year	Chart positions
Year	US Billboard Top R&B Albums
2015	20
