= 7 (Con Funk Shun album) =

Studio album by Con Funk Shun
- Released: 1981
- Recorded: 1981
- Studio: The Automatt & Russian Hill San Francisco, California and Harbour Sound Sausalito, California
- Genre: Funk, soul
- Label: Mercury
- Producer: Con Funk Shun

Con Funk Shun chronology
Touch (1980)	7 (1981)	To the Max (1982)

Professional ratings
Review scores
Source	Rating
Allmusic	3/5 stars

7 is the eighth studio album by the funk/r&b band Con Funk Shun, released in 1981 on Mercury Records.

== Critical reception ==
Craig Lytle of Allmusic, in a 3/5 star review, commented "Con Funk Shun entitled this album Con Funk Shun 7 to commemorate the seven members in the group and to acknowledge that the number seven represents renaissance -- rebirth, the emergence of something new."

== Track listing ==
1. "Bad Lady" (Danny A. Thomas, Felton Pilate, Linda Lou McCall) 4:09
2. "I'll Get You Back" (Felton Pilate, Nita Wells-Pilate) 5:12
3. "Body Lovers" (Michael Cooper, Perri McKissack) 4:40
4. "Promise You Love" (Michael Cooper, Linda Lou McCall, Anthony Crosley) 7:34
5. "If You're In Need Of Love" (Felton Pilate, Nita Wells-Pilate) 6:35
6. "Straight From The Heart" (Felton Pilate, Nita Wells-Pilate) 4:39
7. "A Song For You" (Paul Harrell, Felton Pilate, Peggy W. Harrell) 5:00
8. "California 1" (Louis A. McCall, Felton Pilate, Linda Lou McCall) 4:36

== Personnel ==
=== Con Funk Shun ===
- Michael Vernon Cooper: Rhythm and Lead Guitars, Sitar, Synthesizers, Vocals
- Felton Pilate II: Lead Guitar, Trombone, Piano, Synthesizers, Vocoder, Vocals
- Danny Thomas: Piano, Organ, Synthesizers, Clavinet, Vocoder, Vocals
- Karl Fuller: Trumpet, Flugelhorn, Percussion, Vocals
- Paul Harrell: Sax, Flute, Percussion, Vocals
- Cedric Martin: Bass, Vocals
- Louis McCall: Drums, Percussion, Vocals

=== Additional personnel ===
- Scott Roberts, Pete Escovedo Jr.: Percussion
- Marvin McFadden: Trumpet
- Melecio Madgalugo: Sax
- Garry Jackson: Bass
- Bari Boyer and Joye Carter: Backing Vocals

== Charts ==
Year	Chart positions	
Year	US Pop	US R&B
1982	82	17

=== Singles ===
Year	Single	US R&B
1981	"Bad Lady"	19
1982	"Straight From The Heart"	79
