= Spirit of Love =

Spirit Of Love

Studio album by Con Funk Shun
- Released: 1980
- Recorded: 1980
- Studio: The Automatt, San Francisco, California
- Genre: Funk, soul
- Label: Mercury Records
- Producer: Skip Scarborough

Con Funk Shun chronology
Candy (1979)	Spirit Of Love (1980)	Touch (1980)

Professional ratings
Review scores
Source	Rating
Allmusic	3.5/5 stars

Spirit Of Love is the sixth album by the funk/r&b band Con Funk Shun, released in 1980 on Mercury Records. This album has been certified Gold in the US by the RIAA.

== Track listing ==
1. "Got To Be Enough" (M. Cooper/F. Pilate)
2. "By Your Side" (F. Pilate)
3. "Curtain Call" (F. Pilate/S. Scarborough)
4. "Early Morning Sunshine" (C. Martin/G. DeWitty/D. Martin)
5. "Spirit Of Love" (P. Harrell/S. Scarborough)
6. "Happy Face" (M. Cooper)
7. "All Up To You" (K. Fuller/F. Pilate)
8. "Juicy" (M. Cooper)
9. "Honey Wild" (L. McCall/D. Thomas/L.L. McCall)
10. "Lovestruck 1980" (M. Cooper/T. DeWayne)

== Personnel ==
- Michael Vernon Cooper - lead and rhythm guitar, lead and background vocals
- Karl Fuller - trumpet, flugelhorn, valve trombone, background vocals
- Paul Harrell - all soprano, tenor and alto saxophone and flute solos, background vocals
- Cedric Martin - bass guitar, lead and background vocals
- Louis A. McCall - drums, syndrums, background vocals
- Felton C. Pilate - slide and valve trombone, keyboards, all synthesizer solos, rhythm guitar, lead and background vocals
- Danny A. Thomas - clavinet, organ, electric and acoustic pianos, synthesizer, background vocals

== Charts ==
Chart (1980)	Peak position
Billboard Top LPs	30
Billboard Top Soul LPs	7

=== Singles ===
Year	Single	Chart positions	
Year	Single	US R&B	US Dance
1980	"Got To Be Enough"	8	20
1980	"By Your Side"	27	—
1980	"Happy Face"	87	—
