= Sounds...and Stuff Like That!! =

Studio album by Quincy Jones
- Released: 1978
- Recorded: 1978; Cherokee Recording Studios, L.A., Westlake II, L.A. and A&R Recording, N.Y.; Jazz Violins on "Tell Me A Bedtime Story" at Sound Ideas, N.Y
- Genre: Jazz, Disco
- Length: 35:48
- Label: A&M
- Producer: Quincy Jones

Quincy Jones chronology
Roots (1977)	Sounds...and Stuff Like That!! (1978)	The Dude (1981)

Singles from Sounds...and Stuff Like That!!
- 1. "Stuff Like That" Released: June 1978

Professional ratings
Review scores
Source	Rating
AllMusic	3/5 stars
The Rolling Stone Jazz Record Guide	2/5 stars

Sounds...and Stuff Like That!! is a 1978 studio album by Quincy Jones.

== Track listing ==
1. "Stuff Like That" (Quincy Jones, Valerie Simpson, Nickolas Ashford, Eric Gale, Steve Gadd, Richard Tee, Ralph MacDonald) – 6:17
  - Vocalists: Nick Ashford, Valerie Simpson, Chaka Khan
  - Alto sax solo: George Young
2. "I'm Gonna Miss You in the Morning" (Jones, Tom Bahler, MacDonald) – 3:31
  - Vocalists: Patti Austin and Luther Vandross
  - Lyricon solo: Tom Scott
3. "Love, I Never Had It So Good" (Jones, Bahler, Patti Austin, Tee) – 5:14
  - Vocalists: Patt Austin and Charles May
  - Electric tenor sax solo: Michael Brecker
  - Fender bass solo: Anthony Jackson
4. "Tell Me a Bedtime Story" (Herbie Hancock) – 6:46
  - Flute solo: Hubert Laws
  - Electric piano: Herbie Hancock
  - Jazz violins: Harry Lookofsky (based on a Herbie Hancock piano solo transcribed by Sy Johnson)
5. "Love Me by Name" (Lesley Gore, Ellen Weston) – 4:10
  - Vocalist: Patti Austin
  - Keyboards: Herbie Hancock
  - Guitar: Eric Gale
6. "Superwoman (Where Were You When I Needed You)" (Stevie Wonder) – 5:26
  - Vocalist: Patti Austin
  - Flute solos: Hubert Laws
  - Electric piano solo: Herbie Hancock
  - Lyricon solo: Tom Scott
7. "Takin' It to the Streets" (Michael McDonald) – 4:24
  - Vocalists: Luther Vandross and Gwen Guthrie
  - Tenor sax solo: Michael Brecker

== Personnel ==
- Quincy Jones – producer, arranger

Rhythm section

- Ralph MacDonald – percussion
- Steve Gadd – drums
- Anthony Jackson – bass guitar
- Eric Gale – guitar
- Richard Tee – acoustic piano, fender rhodes, organ
- Clark Spangler – synthesizer keyboard bass programming
- David T. Walker – guitar (track 1)
- Melvin "Wah-Wah" Watson – guitar (track 7)
- Michael Boddicker – synthesizer, vocoder, synthesizer programming

New York horn section

- Jon Faddis, Virgil Jones – trumpets
- Alan Raph – bass trombone
- George Young, David Tofani, Harold Vick, Howard Johnson – saxophones

L.A. horn section

- Chuck Findley, Snooky Young, Oscar Brashear, Bill Lamb – trumpets
- Chauncey Welsch, Robert Payne, Jimmy Cleveland, Donald Waldrup, Bill Watrous, Charles Loper – trombones
- Henry Sigismonti, David Duke, Sidney Muldrow, Arthur Maebe, Aubrey Bouh – French horns
- Hubert Laws, Bud Shank, Bill Perkins, Jerome Richardson, Buddy Collette – saxophones, flutes
- Tommy Johnson, Roger Bobo – tubas

L.A. string section

- Israel Baker (concertmaster), Nathan Ross, Marvin Limonick, Sheldon Sanov, John Wittenberg, Arnold Belnick, Jerome Reisler, Harry Bluestone, Wilbert Nuttycombe, Carl LaMagna, Betty LaMagna, Connie Kupka – violins
- David Schwartz, Myer Bello, Samuel Boghossian, Leonard Selic – violas
- Dennis Karmazyn, Gloria Strassner – cello
- Gayle Levant – harp

New York super singers

- Patti Austin (concertmistress)
- Gwen Guthrie
- Lani Groves
- Vivian Cherry
- Ullanda McCullough
- Tom Bahler (director)
- Luther Vandross
- Zach Sanders
- Bill Eaton
- Frank Floyd

Technical personnel

- Johnny Mandel, Tom Bahler, L. Leon Pendarvis, Sy Johnson – arranging
- Bruce Swedien – engineer, mixing
- Niels Erik Lund, Ollie Cotton, Anthony D'Amigo, Cheech D'Amigo – assistant engineers
- Jim McCurdy – jazz violin engineer (track 4)
- Bernie Grundman – mastering

== Certifications ==
Region	Certification	Certified units/sales
United States (RIAA)	Platinum	1,000,000^{^}
^{^} Shipments figures based on certification alone.
