= Electric Lady (Con Funk Shun album) =

Studio album by Con Funk Shun
- Released: 1985
- Recorded: 1985
- Genre: Funk, soul
- Length: 36:23
- Label: Mercury
- Producer: Con Funk Shun

Con Funk Shun chronology
| Fever (1983) | Electric Lady (1985) | Burnin' Love (1986) |

Professional ratings
Review scores
| Source | Rating |
|---|---|
| Allmusic | 3/5 stars |

Electric Lady is the twelfth album by funk band Con Funk Shun, released in 1985 on Mercury Records.

== Critical reception ==
Craig Lytle of Allmusic, in a 3/5 star review, commented "This was unlike any album Con Funk Shun had recorded to date...Intending to try something new without forsaking their appeal and sound, the group solicited various producers, even though group members Felton Pilate and Michael Cooper were credited as arrangers on a couple of selections...This album is full of competent selections; any one of them, such as "Pretty Lady" and "Don't Go," would have been a wise choice as a release."

== Tracklisting ==
| No. | Title | Writer(s) | Length |
|---|---|---|---|
| 1. | "Turn the Music Up" | Kevy Baby | 04:38 |
| 2. | "Rock It All Night" | Maurice Starr | 04:20 |
| 3. | "I'm Leaving Baby" | Michael Cooper/Wayne Wallis | 05:42 |
| 4. | "Tell Me What You're Gonna Do" | M. Madden, C. Martin, Ross Redding | 03:56 |
| 5. | "Electric Lady" | Kenneth Cedar, David Renzer | 03:50 |
| 6. | "Don't Go (I Want You Back)" | Attala Zane Giles, Billy Osborne | 04:47 |
| 7. | "Circle of Love" | Scott David English, Felton C. Pilate II | 04:13 |
| 8. | "Pretty Lady" | Maurice Starr | 04:57 |

== Charts ==
| Year | Chart positions | |
| Year | US Pop | US R&B |
|---|---|---|
| 1985 | 62 | 9 |
