= Ella Feingold =

American musician

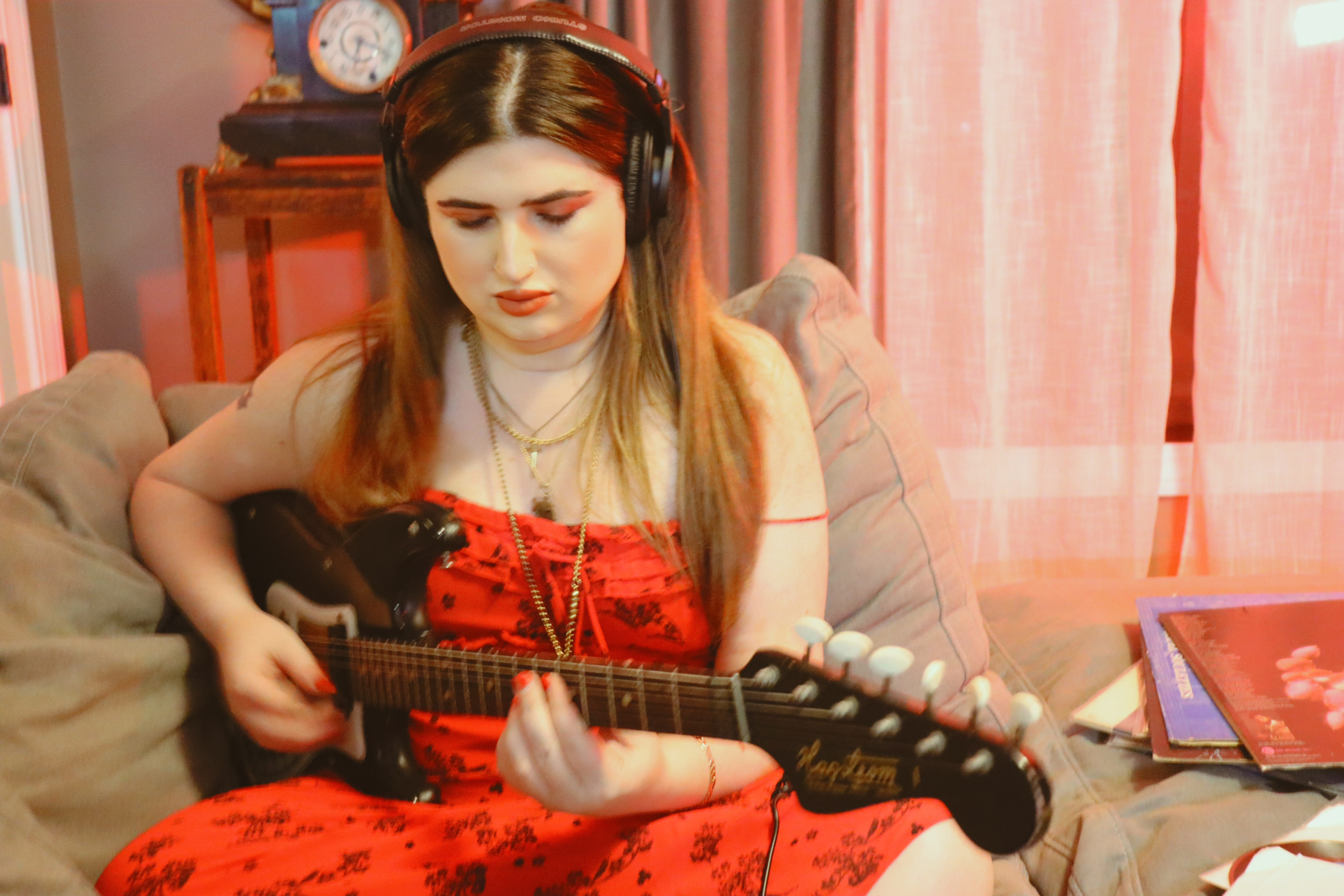
- Feingold playing guitar, 2026.

Background information
- Genres: R&B; funk
- Occupations: Guitarist; orchestrator; composer; producer
- Instrument: Electric guitar
- Website: feingoldmusic.com

Ella Rae Feingold is an American session guitarist, orchestrator, composer, and music producer based in Massachusetts. Feingold has worked with Janet Jackson, Jay-Z, Erykah Badu, Queen Latifah, Nas, Destiny's Child, and George Clinton. In 2022, she was awarded a Grammy participation certificate for her performance on the single "Leave the Door Open" by Silk Sonic. Feingold released her solo album, Tell a Beautiful Lie With Sound, on February 14, 2026.

== Early life ==
Growing up in Massachusetts, Feingold developed a love for R&B and funk guitar from the Motown music her father played in the car. She attended and graduated high school in Swampscott. In 2002, she attended Berklee College of Music but dropped out that same year in order to study under the mentorship of neo-soul guitarist Chalmers Alford.

== Career ==
Feingold began her career in music as a high school sophomore in the late 1990s, playing guitar in clubs at night. She began recording music at home in 2002. She played guitar in Queen Latifah's band for the 2005 Sugar Water Festival tour. There, she met and worked with Erykah Badu for eight years until moving from Los Angeles to the Berkshire mountains of Massachusetts in 2014. Feingold then worked in music orchestration and arrangement for video games, including the series Destiny and movies, including the 2019 film Godzilla: King of the Monsters). She later worked on the 2021 debut studio album An Evening with Silk Sonic by Silk Sonic. She was credited with guitar, guitar effects, and/or the vibraphone on several tracks including "Leave the Door Open", which received four awards at the 64th Annual Grammy Awards in 2022 (Record of the Year, Song of the Year, Best R&B Performance, and Best R&B Song).

Feingold released her debut solo album, 4-Track Ephemera, in 2025. That same year she released a collaborative duo album, Different Strokes for Different Folks, with American guitarist Charlie Hunter via SideHustle Records. In 2026, she released her second solo album, Tell A Beautiful Lie With Sound, which was recorded in Jeff Buckley's bedroom in Memphis, Tennessee. Feingold is scheduled to perform at the 72nd Newport Jazz Festival on August 2, 2026 with Charlie Hunter.

Feingold is on Instagram and TikTok where she posts guitar tutorials. She plays guitar with inverted tuning.

== Personal life ==
Feingold is a trans woman. She started transitioning in 2020 while working on An Evening with Silk Sonic and had undergone hormone replacement therapy for nine months before publicly coming out.

== Discography ==
=== Solo albums ===
- Tell A Beautiful Lie With Sound (2026)
- 4-Track Ephemera (2025)

=== With Charlie Hunter ===
- Different Strokes for Different Folks (SideHustle, 2025)
