= To the Max (Con Funk Shun album) =

Studio album by Con Funk Shun
- Released: August 1982; January 1983 (re-release)
- Recorded: 1982
- Genres: Funk, soul
- Length: 40:36
- Label: Mercury Records
- Producers: Con Funk Shun, Gordon DeWitty

Con Funk Shun chronology
Con Funk Shun 7 (1981)	To the Max (1982)	Fever (1983)

Professional ratings
Review scores
Source	Rating
Allmusic	3/5 stars

To the Max is the ninth studio album by R&B band Con Funk Shun, released in 1982 on Mercury Records.

== Critical reception ==
Craig Lytle of Allmusic gave the album a 3\5 star rating. Lytle claimed "Known for their up-tempo party songs, Con Funk Shun came strong on this album too...(most) of the album seems more experimental; however, Con Funk Shun maintains a high standard of musical quality."

== Track listing ==
1. "Ms. Got-the-Body" – 3:51
2. "Let's Ride and Slide" – 4:30
3. "Everlove" – 4:06
4. "Hide and Freak" – 4:23
5. "You Are the One" – 3:38
6. "Take It to the Max" – 5:01
7. "Love's Train" – 5:12
8. "Ain't Nobody Baby" – 5:32
9. "T.H.E. Freak" – 4:23

== Personnel ==
=== Con Funk Shun ===
- Michael Vernon Cooper – lead and rhythm guitar, vocals
- Karl Fuller – trumpet, flugelhorn, percussion, vocals
- Paul Harrell – saxophone, flute, percussion, vocals
- Cedric A Martin – bass guitar, vocals
- Louis A. McCall, Sr. – drums, percussion, vocals
- Felton Pilate – trombone, rhythm guitar, synthesizer, vocals
- Danny A. Thomas – piano, clavinet, organ, synthesizer, vocals.

== Charts ==
=== Album ===
Chart (1982–1983)	Peak position
US Billboard 200	115
US Top R&B/Hip-Hop Albums	9

=== Singles ===
Year	Single	US R&B
1982	"Ain't Nobody, Baby"	31
1983	"Ms. Got the Body"	15
1983	"You Are the One"	47
