= Nobody Else (Tex Pistol and Rikki Morris song) =

1988 single by Tex Pistol and Rikki Morris

Single by Tex Pistol and Rikki Morris

from the album Nobody Else
- B-side: "Wilf"
- Released: 1988
- Length: 4:16
- Label: Pagan
- Songwriter: Rikki Morris
- Producer: Ian Morris

Tex Pistol and Rikki Morris singles chronology
"The Game of Love" (1987)	"Nobody Else" (1988)	"Come Back Louise" (1989)

"Nobody Else" is a song by New Zealand musician brothers Tex Pistol (Ian Morris) and Rikki Morris. It was the follow-up single to Tex Pistol's cover of Wayne Fontana's "The Game of Love", which reached number one in New Zealand in 1987. "Nobody Else", an original song, also charted at number one.

== Background ==
After Tex Pistol had a number-one single in 1987 with "The Game of Love", Pagan Records head Trevor Reekie convinced Ian Morris to release "Nobody Else" as the follow-up single. It was a romantic ballad written and sung by Morris' younger brother Rikki. The song peaked at number one and charted for 16 weeks, twice as long as "The Game of Love".

== Awards ==
At the 1988 New Zealand Music Awards, "Nobody Else" was nominated for Single of the Year, with Ian Morris also nominated for Producer of the Year for the same song while Rikki Morris won Songwriter of the Year.

== Charts ==
=== Weekly charts ===
Chart (1988)	Peak position
New Zealand (Recorded Music NZ)	1

=== Year-end charts ===
Chart (1988)	Position
New Zealand (RIANZ)	6
