= Rikki Morris =

New Zealand musician

- Also known as: Rick E. Morris
- Born: Richard Ernest Morris; 12 August 1960 (age 66); Barnet, North London, England
- Origin: Auckland
- Genres: Pop; soft rock
- Occupations: Singer; songwriter; sound engineer; television presenter
- Instruments: Vocals; guitar
- Years active: 1979–present
- Formerly of: The Crocodiles
- Website: morrisound.co.nz

Richard Ernest Morris (born 12 August 1960) is a British-born New Zealand musician, singer–songwriter and sound engineer better known by his stage name, Rikki Morris. He is perhaps best known for his 1988 hit single "Nobody Else" which he wrote and performed with his older brother Ian Morris/Tex Pistol and which reached number one in New Zealand and remained on the charts for sixteen weeks.

== Early life ==
Morris was born in Barnet, London, England, the younger brother of Ian Morris (born 1957) but emigrated with his family to New Zealand in July 1966. Settling in the Auckland suburb of Glendowie, Morris attended Sacred Heart College with his brother Ian. It was while at Sacred Heart that Ian would meet Dave Dobbyn and Peter Urlich, all three going on to form the band Th' Dudes – Rikki would become the band's roadie when they turned professional.

== Musical career ==
Morris joined Th' Dude's as a roadie in 1979 at the age of 18. He was to quickly learn the ropes of setting up the band's sound system, becoming their sound engineer until the band broke up in 1980. Shortly afterward, Morris was recruited by New Zealand band The Crocodiles, initially as a sound engineer and then as a rhythm guitarist. The Crocodiles moved to Sydney but broke up soon after.

After several years songwriting in England he returned to New Zealand at the end of 1985, briefly joining The Vibe Brigade. In 1987, Morris formed a recording duo with brother Ian to produce Rikki's song "Nobody Else". Ian was about to release "The Game of Love" as Tex Pistol (which went to number one in New Zealand in September 1987); Nobody Else became the follow-up, recorded as Tex Pistol with Rikki Morris. The single became a number one hit for the duo on 9 October 1988, remaining in the charts for sixteen weeks. Nobody Else would earn Morris the NZ Music Awards songwriter of the year award in 1988, while Ian was nominated for Producer of the Year for the same song.

The follow-up to Nobody Else was "Come Back, Louise", which was released in 1989, again as Tex Pistol and Rikki Morris. The song didn't chart but it did receive some airplay. Morris's next single was "Heartbroke" which he released in 1990 and spent twelve weeks in the charts, peaking at 24. This was Morris's debut solo single, with brother Ian engineering and producing the record. Heartbroke won Rikki the APRA Silver Scroll songwriting award in 1991 with Ian named Best Engineer at the NZ Music Awards. Heartbroke resulted in Rikki Morris being signed to Mushroom Records and resulted in a move to Melbourne. Unfortunately, Mushroom Records were to suffer financial issues and Morris was one of a number of artists culled to cut costs before he even completed his debut album.

Morris left Melbourne for New Zealand and returned to sound engineering. With the help of Eddie Rayner, Morris released a solo album Everest in 1996. The album's first single "World Stands Still" charted for one week at No. 49.

After a 25-year break from releasing his own music, Morris returned in 2021 with the single "The One Thing I Can’t Live Without". The song topped the New Zealand iTunes charts after its release.

Rikki released his second solo album, titled 'About Time', in August 2024.

== Television ==
Morris replaced Nigel Hurst as presenter on the short-lived programme 3.45 Live! in 1989 which he co-presented with Fenella Bathfield. This role was to last only eight months. In 1994 Morris briefly hosted the health and lifestyle show Alive And Kicking with Jude Dobson, and in 1999 he hosted TV3's Get Your Act Together, which showcased unknown songwriters.

In 2016, a documentary about Morris's musical career was released under the title Nobody Else: The Rikki Morris Story.

== Discography ==
=== Singles ===
Year	Title	Peak chart positions
Year	Title	NZ
1988	"Nobody Else" as Tex Pistol and Rikki Morris	1
1989	"Come Back Louise" as Tex Pistol and Rikki Morris	—
1990	"Heartbroke" as Rikki Morris	24
1996	"World Stand Still" as Rikki Morris	49
"—" denotes a recording that did not chart or was not released in that territory.

=== Albums ===
Year	Title	Details	Peak chart positions
Year	Title	Details	NZ
1988	Nobody Else	Released as Tex Pistol; Label: Pagan Records (PAL 1039)	28
1996	Everest	Released as Rikki Morris; Label: Criminal Records, thru Warners	
2024	About Time	Released as Rikki Morris; Label: Rikki Morris (RMLP001)	

== Awards ==
Year	Award	Title	Recipient
1988	NZ Music Awards: Songwriter of the Year	Nobody Else	Rikki Morris
1991	APRA Silver Scroll	Heartbroke	Rikki Morris
2005	North Shore City Civic Award	—	Rikki Morris
2006	Radio Industry Award: Best Radio Commercial	Don't Drive It Over A Clifty	Shaun O'Neill, Debbie O'Neill & Rikki Morris

== Personal life ==
Rikki Morris married When the Cat's Away singer Debbie Harwood in 1989, they had 2 children, Marlon (b.1990) and Gala (b.1994). Rikki is also father to another younger daughter, Oni Kidman (b.2004). Rikki married Janey Kline in 2014. They reside in Auckland with their two cats.
