= Suave (singer) =

American singer

- Born: February 22, 1966 (age 60)
- Origin: Los Angeles, California, U.S.
- Genres: R&B
- Years active: 1988–1991
- Label: Capitol Records

Waymond Anderson, better known by his stage name Suave, stylized as Suavé (born February 22, 1966), is a former American R&B singer, who hit the American top 40 charts with a cover of The Temptations' "My Girl" in 1988.

== Discovery and success ==
Anderson was discovered at a New Edition concert in California in the mid-1980s, when one of the members invited him to sing on stage with them. After his initial nervousness on stage, he decided this was the career route he wanted to take. A few years later, in 1988, Suave released his first single, "My Girl," as well as an album, I'm Your Playmate. The single rose to #20 on the Billboard Hot 100 and #22 on the Radio & Records Pop Chart. Later in the year, he released a single called "Shake Your Body," which climbed to #22 on Billboard's Hot R&B/Hip-Hop Singles & Tracks.

In 1991, Suavé released his sophomore album, To The Maxx which failed to chart and the only single “Rocked Your Boots” failed to chart as well, Capitol Records dropped Suavé from the label.

On September 18, 1993, a fire at a crack house near the University of Southern California killed one man. On January 29, 1994, Anderson was arrested at his Calabasas, California home, in front of his wife and son, and charged with fatal arson. Anderson's murder trial began in 1997. After four days of deliberation, Anderson was convicted of first-degree murder and sentenced to life without parole.

During his years in the music business he admitted to being a drug dealer as well as an adulterer. In 2007, Anderson perjured himself in court by recanting an implication of police officer involvement in the death of The Notorious B.I.G.. Anderson remains in prison.

On August 1, 2008, Suge Knight was formally accused of sending death threats to Anderson to change his testimony regarding the 1997 death of The Notorious B.I.G. in court July 31, 2008. In 2015, he was diagnosed with Stage 4 throat cancer.

== Chart statistics ==
"My Girl" (1988 - single)

1. 03 Billboard Hot R&B/Hip-Hop Singles & Tracks
2. 20 Billboard Hot 100
3. 22 Radio & Records

"Shake Your Body" (1988 - single)

1. 46 Billboard Hot R&B/Hip-Hop Singles & Tracks

"I'm Your Playmate" (1988 - album)

1. 26 Billboard Top R&B/Hip-Hop Albums
2. 101 Billboard 200 Albums Chart

"Rocked Your Boots" (1991 - Single) (Did not chart)

== Discography ==
- I'm Your Playmate (1988)
- To the Maxx (1991)
