= Louis A. McCall Sr. =

American drummer

- McCall in 1982.

Background information
- Also known as: Tony
- Born: Louis Anthony McCall; December 28, 1951; Alameda, California, U.S.
- Origin: Vallejo, California, U.S.
- Died: June 25, 1997 (aged 45) Stone Mountain, Georgia, U.S.
- Genres: R&B; soul; funk
- Occupations: Musician; songwriter; producer
- Instruments: Drums; vocals; percussion
- Years active: 1969–1997
- Labels: Fretone; Mercury

Louis Anthony McCall Sr. (December 28, 1951 – June 25, 1997) was an American singer, songwriter, drummer, and event planner. McCall is best remembered as the co-founder and drummer of the American funk/R&B band Con Funk Shun, which gained fame during the 1970s and 1980s with R&B songs such as: "Ffun" (1978), "Chase Me" (1979) and "Baby I'm Hooked (Right into Your Love)" (1983). McCall's wife is music business consultant and songwriter Linda Lou McCall. In 1997, McCall was murdered in a home invasion robbery at age 45.

== Career ==
=== Con Funk Shun ===
Louis A. McCall Sr. and singer/guitarist Michael Cooper formed Con Funk Shun as high school students in Vallejo, California. Adding members Karl A. Fuller, Paul A. Harrell, Cedric A. Martin, Felton C. Pilate and Danny A. Thomas, the band started out as a backing group for the Soul Children under the name Project Soul. They began working with Stax Records staff songwriters, and while recording at Audio Dimensions, a sound studio in Memphis, Tennessee, producer Ted Sturges both named the group (after an instrumental recording by The Nite-Liters) and produced their first album, Organized Con Funk Shun.

In 1976, Con Funk Shun signed to Mercury Records, releasing eleven albums over a span of ten years. The group's 1977 album, Secrets, was certified gold in the U.S., as were Loveshine (1978), Candy (1979), and Spirit of Love (1980). They scored a string of top ten hits on the Billboard black singles chart, including "Ffun" (#1 in 1977), "Shake and Dance with Me" (#5 in 1978), "Chase Me" (#4 in 1979), "Got to Be Enough" (#8 in 1980) and "Too Tight" (#8 in 1981). Tensions from within the group built over the 1980s, and the group's final album, Burning Love, was recorded without songwriter and vocalist Felton Pilate, who had left Con Funk Shun following a physical altercation involving McCall. The band let McCall go after he missed two concert dates in order to deal with medical problems resulting from a teenage car crash. After leaving Mercury Records, the band broke up in 1986, but some members of the group reunited alongside touring musicians for concerts in the 1990s.

=== Later career ===
After leaving Con Funk Shun in 1986, McCall joined forces with his wife, a music business consultant, and started an artist management company in the Washington, DC area. In 1989, they discovered Keith Martin, an aspiring R&B artist, and signed on as his managers. When Linda Lou McCall was hired by rapper MC Hammer in 1990, the McCalls put Martin on Hammer's Please Hammer, Don't Hurt 'Em tour as a backup musician and vocalist, which launched Martin's career in the music industry. In 1992, Linda Lou formed her own company, The Entertainment Qartel, Inc. (EQartel), specializing in music business administration and entertainment marketing and promotions. In addition to doing radio promotion for EQartel's Atlanta-based street team, the Rhyme Scene Unit, McCall also became a successful event planner, most notably producing a celebrity benefit for actor/activist Danny Glover at The Fairmont Hotel in San Francisco in January 1993.

== Death and aftermath ==
On June 25, 1997, Louis McCall was found murdered outside a friend's home in Stone Mountain, Georgia, the apparent victim of a home-invasion robbery. His wife, Linda Lou, fought to keep the case active for eleven years, even asking the Governor of Georgia to assist in reopening the case in 2003. Finally, a suspect was indicted in 2007 in connection with the murder, but it took another year before the case made it to trial on July 21, 2008, with 29-year-old Marques Clair as defendant. Clair was originally arrested with another suspect in McCall's slaying in 1999, but prosecutors had dropped the charge due to the District Attorney's refusal to bring the case before a jury with insufficient evidence.

Just two days after the start of Clair's murder trial, the proceedings were halted by Superior Court Judge Gregory Adams. A spokeswoman for the DeKalb County Georgia district attorney's office, Jada Hudspeth, stated that the suspension of the trial was "based on an omission" of information. Hudspeth said that District Attorney, Gwen Keyes Fleming, and her staff would evaluate the evidence in the case before deciding whether to retry Clair. On August 7, 2008, after a mistrial was declared, the charges against Clair were formally dismissed with prejudice.

== Legacy ==
In recognition of the fact that Louis McCall was born in Alameda, CA, his name was chosen by the Alameda City Planning Board in April 2014 for naming one of the streets in the proposed residential community, Alameda Landing.

On September 21, 2014, Louis McCall and the other six members of Con Funk Shun were honored by the National R&B Music Society with a Lifetime Achievement Award at a black tie dinner and award ceremony in Atlantic City, New Jersey. At the same event, McCall's wife Linda Lou was presented with the "Unsung Heroine" award for her key role in the success of Con Funk Shun and her continued role in keeping the group's legacy alive, in addition to her tireless contribution to R&B music for over four decades.

As well as being the band's leader, responsible for booking many of their most lucrative tours, Louis (along with Linda Lou) wrote several songs for Con Funk Shun, including "California 1", "Bad Lady", and "Honey Wild" (co-written with Con Funk Shun member Danny Thomas). In 2007, "Honey Wild", from the 1980 Spirit of Love album, was sampled by Lil Wayne for his Grammy Award-winning CD Tha Carter III.

== Personal life ==
In 1968, at the age of sixteen, McCall was seriously injured in an automobile accident in Vallejo, California. He experienced medical problems in his adult life as a result of the accident.

Louis met his wife, the former Linda Lou Bolden from Washington, DC, in 1973, when both were working at Stax Records. The couple married on January 15, 1976, in a civil ceremony in San Francisco, California. They had two children, Lindsay Chérie McCall (born in 1979) and Louis Anthony McCall II (born in 1982). McCall and his wife separated not long before his death, but the pair remained close both personally and professionally.

McCall's first grandchild, Liam Richard Long, was born on March 2, 2014, to his daughter Lindsay, a Tempe police officer, and her husband in Scottsdale, Arizona.

== Discography ==
=== Albums ===
- Organized Con Funk Shun (1973), Fretone
- The Memphis Sessions (1973), Fretone
- Con-Funk-Shun (1976), Mercury
- Secrets (1977), Mercury
- Loveshine (1978), Mercury
- Candy (1979), Mercury
- Spirit of Love (1980), Mercury
- Touch (1980), Mercury
- Con Funk Shun 7 (1981), Mercury
- To the Max (1982), Mercury
- Fever (1983), Mercury
- Electric Lady (1985), Mercury
- Burnin' Love (1986), Mercury

=== Singles ===
- "Sho Feels Good To Me" (1976) – #66 Black Singles
- "Confunkshunizeya" (1977) – #31 Black Singles
- "Ffun" (1977) – #1 Black Singles, #23 Pop
- "Shake And Dance With Me" (1978) – #5 Black Singles, #60 Pop Singles
- "So Easy" (1978) – #28 Black Singles
- "(Let Me Put) Love on Your Mind" (1979) – #24 Black Singles
- "Chase Me" (1979) – #4 Black Singles
- "Da Lady" (1980) – #60 Black Singles
- "By Your Side" (1980) – #27 Black Singles
- "Got To Be Enough" (1980) – #8 Black Singles, #20 Club Play
- "Happy Face" (1980) – #87 Black Singles
- "Bad Lady" (1981) – #19 Black Singles
- "Lady's Wild" (1981) – #42 Black Singles
- "Too Tight" (1981) – #8 Black Singles, #40 Pop Singles, #25 Club Play
- "Ain't Nobody, Baby" (1982) – #31 Black Singles
- "Straight From The Heart" (1982) – #79 Black Singles
- "Baby I'm Hooked (Right into Your Love)" (1983) – #5 Hot R&B, #76 Hot 100
- "Ms. Got-The-Body" (1983) – #15 Black Singles
- "Love's Train/You Are The One" (1983) – #47 Black Singles
- "Don't Let Your Love Grow Cold" (1984) – #33 Hot R&B
- "Electric Lady" (1985) – #4 Hot R&B, #32 Hot Dance
- "I'm Leaving Baby" (1985) – #12 Hot R&B
- "Tell Me What You're Gonna Do" (1985) – #47 Hot R&B
- "Burnin' Love" (1986) – #8 Hot R&B
- "She's a Star" (1986) – #80 Hot R&B
- "Kush" (2008) – sample of "Honey Wild", by Lil Wayne for Tha Carter III
