= George Young (saxophonist) =

American jazz musician (1937–2026)

- Born: July 10, 1937
- Died: April 23, 2026 (aged 88)
- Occupation: Musician
- Instruments: Saxophone; flute
- Formerly of: White Elephant Orchestra, Saturday Night Live Band, Manhattan Jazz Quintet

George Ernest Young (7 October 1937 – 23 April 2026) was an American jazz saxophonist and flautist.

He was born in Philadelphia, Pennsylvania, United States. After leading his own band in the late 1950s, Young became a New York City session and studio musician in the 1960s and joined several line-ups including Mike Mainieri's jazz-rock big band White Elephant Orchestra, as well as later joining the Saturday Night Live Band.

In 1982, along with fellow saxophonists David Sanborn, Ronnie Cuber, Young was voted one of the Most Valued Players by the New York Chapter of the National Academy of Recording Arts & Sciences' annual awards edition.

Young has led his own quartets featuring Harold Danko, Rick Laird and Butch Miles (early 1980s) and another quartet, featuring Warren Bernhardt, Tony Marino and Tom Whaley (early 1990s). He has performed with Eric Clapton, Mariah Carey, Luciano Pavarotti, Mick Jagger, John Lennon, James Brown, Frank Sinatra, Madonna, Dizzy Gillespie, Tony Bennett, Steve Gadd among others.

Young died in California on 23 April 2026, at the age of 88.

== Discography ==
=== As leader ===
- 1962: Presenting the Unbelieveable George Young, Columbia Records CS 8681
- 1989: Old Times - Chiaroscuro Records CR(D) 307
- 1994: Salute (with Louie Bellson and Bobby Shew) - Chiaroscuro Records CR(D) 329

=== As sideman/session musician ===
- 1974: James Taylor - Walking Man
- 1976: Walter Murphy Band - A Fifth of Beethoven, Private Stock Records (Soprano, alto, tenor saxophone, and flute solos)
- 1977: Maynard Ferguson - Conquistador, Columbia Records
- 1977: Walter Bishop Jr. - Soul Village, Muse
- 1978: Quincy Jones - Sounds...and Stuff Like That!!
- 1979: Dr. John - City Lights,
- 1979: Ian Hunter - You're Never Alone with a Schizophrenic, Chrysalis
- 1980: Peter Criss- Out of Control ( saxophone on "Where Will They Run?")
- 1984: Yoko Ono - Every Man Has a Woman, Polydor (Young plays on the track "Now or Never", recorded in 1972)
- 1996: Christy Baron - I Thought About You, Chesky
