= Con Funk Shun =

American rhythm and blues group

- Also known as: Project Soul
- Origin: Vallejo, California, United States
- Genres: R&B; funk; soul
- Years active: 1969–1986; 1993–present
- Labels: Mercury; Fretone
- Members: Michael Cooper; Felton Pilate II; Cedric Martin; Paul Harrell; Karl Fuller; Danny Thomas
- Past members: Louis A. McCall Sr.: Dale Edward Chung

Con Funk Shun (formerly known as Project Soul) is an American R&B and funk band from Vallejo, California, formed in 1969. They were influenced by funk progenitors James Brown and Sly and the Family Stone. Signed to Mercury Records in 1976, the band had numerous successful national and overseas tours, eleven albums, and a number of hit singles. The group formally disbanded in 1986.

== History ==
The band began in 1969 as Project Soul, formed by Louis A. McCall Sr. (drums/percussion/vocals) and Michael Cooper (rhythm guitar/lead vocals), both of whom were high school students in Vallejo, California. By 1971, the band also included bassist Cedric Martin, keyboardist Danny "Sweet Man" Thomas, trumpeter Karl Fuller, and woodwinds player Paul "Maceo" Harrell. Soon thereafter, this fledgling group's classic lineup became complete when lead vocals/multi-instrumentalist Felton Pilate came on board. Project Soul released a lone single in 1972.

In the mid-1970s, the seven musicians formed a new band, calling themselves "Con-Funk-Shun", after a song by the instrumental ensemble the Nite-Liters. They relocated to Memphis, Tennessee in 1973 when they were hired to back up Stax Records artists the Soul Children. There, they came to the attention of Estelle Axton who signed them to her Fretone Records label, where they released 2 singles. Their debut album, Organized Con Funk Shun, was recorded in 1973 but remained unreleased until 1978. (More Memphis Sessions from this era remained unreleased until 1980.) In 1975 the band’s name was altered from "Confunkshun" to "Con Funk Shun" by Louis’ wife Linda Lou McCall who also handled the marketing and public relations. They went to Japan for performance in 1975.

In 1976, Con Funk Shun signed to Mercury Records, and then went on to release eleven albums over a span of ten years. The band's 1977 album, Secrets, was certified gold in the United States, as were the 1978 album Loveshine, the 1979 album Candy, and the 1980 album Spirit of Love. They scored a string of top ten hit songs on the U.S. Billboard black singles chart, including "Ffun" (No. 1 in 1978), "Shake and Dance with Me" (No. 5 in 1978), "Chase Me" (No. 4 in 1979), "Got to Be Enough" (No. 8 in 1980), "Too Tight" (No. 8 in 1981), "Baby, I'm Hooked (Right into Your Love)" (No. 5 in 1983), and "Electric Lady" (No. 4 in 1985). "Ffun" (#23) and "Too Tight" (#40) were the group's only songs that crossed over onto the top 40 on the Billboard Hot 100; 2 others did make the chart, while 4 of their songs hit the Billboard Bubbling Under Hot 100 chart.

Tensions from within the group built over the 1980s, and the band's final album, Burning Love, was recorded without multi instrument-vocalist and songwriter Felton Pilate. After disappointing album sales, Mercury invoked its "key member clause" and dropped the band from the label. Michael Cooper then moved on to a solo run with Warner Bros. Cooper had an R&B hit with "To Prove My Love" in 1987. The remaining original members tried to continue, but repeated efforts with new lead singers fell short, and they ceased performing and recording as Con Funk Shun in 1987.

== Later years ==
Pilate became the in-house record producer and songwriter for M.C. Hammer and his record label Bust It Records. He worked on several albums for the company, including Hammer's Please Hammer, Don't Hurt 'Em album, as well as the bulk of Special Generation's 1990 début album, Take It to the Floor. Lead singer Michael Cooper embarked on a successful career as a solo artist, releasing his solo début album Love Is Such a Funny Game on Warner Bros. Records in 1987, and releasing the 1989 album Just What I Like and the 1992 album Get Closer on Warner Bros.' sister label Reprise Records.

In 1997 Louis McCall was shot and killed in a home invasion robbery. Age 45. As recently as 2013, their eleven Mercury Records albums, along with their Greatest Hits and Best of Con Funk Shun albums, continue to be remastered and released digitally.

In 2015, the More Than Love album was released. Three of the original band members, Michael Cooper, Felton Pilate and Karl Fuller, currently tour as Con Funk Shun. In March 2017, they celebrated their 45th anniversary as a band with four sold-out shows at Yoshi's in Oakland, California.

== Legacy ==
As the late Louis A. McCall Sr. was born in Alameda, California, his name was chosen in April 2014 by the Alameda City Planning Board to be used for one of the street names in the proposed residential community, Alameda Landing.

On September 21, 2014, the seven band members were honored by the National R&B Music Society with a Lifetime Achievement Award, at a black tie dinner and award ceremony in Atlantic City, New Jersey.

In 1996, the R&B group Dru Hill covered Con Funk Shun's "Love's Train" for their eponymous debut album. The song was also covered in February 2022 by R&B duo Silk Sonic. Bruno Mars also released a cover of "Love's Train" in 2022.

== Band members ==
- Michael Cooper
- Louis A. McCall Sr. (deceased)
- Felton Pilate
- Cedric Martin
- Dale Chung
- Karl Fuller
- Paul "Zebulon" Harrell
- Danny "Sweet Man" Thomas
- Eric "EQ" Young
- Ron Moton
- Melvin Carter
- Aaron Green

== Discography ==
=== Albums ===
Year	Title	Peak chart positions		Certifications	Record label
Year	Title	US Pop	US R&B	Certifications	Record label
1973 (recording date)	Organized Con Funk Shun	—	—		Pickwick
1973 (recording date)	The Memphis Sessions	—	—		Fretone
1976	Con Funk Shun	—	—		Mercury
1977	Secrets	51	6	RIAA: Gold	Mercury
1978	Loveshine	32	10	RIAA: Gold	Mercury
1979	Candy	46	7	RIAA: Gold	Mercury
1980	Spirit of Love	30	7	RIAA: Gold	Mercury
1980	Touch	51	7		Mercury
1981	7	82	17		Mercury
1982	To the Max	115	9		Mercury
1983	Fever	105	12		Mercury
1985	Electric Lady	62	9		Mercury
1986	Burnin' Love	121	25		Mercury
2015	More Than Love	—	20		Shanachie
"—" denotes releases that did not chart or were not released in that territory.

=== Singles ===
Year	Title	Peak chart positions					Record label
Year	Title	US Pop	US R&B	US AR&B	US Dance	UK	Record label
1974	"Clique"	—	—	—	—	—	Fretone
1976	"Sho Feels Good to Me"	—	66	—	—	—	Mercury
1977	"Confunkshunizeya"	—	31	—	—	—	Mercury
1977	"Ffun"	23	1	—	—	—	Mercury
1978	"Shake and Dance with Me"	60	5	—	—	—	Mercury
1978	"So Easy"	—	28	—	—	—	Mercury
1979	"(Let Me Put) Love on Your Mind"	—	24	—	—	—	Mercury
1979	"Chase Me"	—	4	—	—	—	Mercury
1980	"Da Lady"	—	60	—	—	—	Mercury
1980	"By Your Side"	—	27	—	—	—	Mercury
1980	"Got to Be Enough"	—	8	—	20	—	Mercury
1980	"Happy Face"	—	87	—	—	—	Mercury
1981	"Bad Lady"	—	19	—	—	—	Mercury
1981	"Lady's Wild"	—	42	—	—	—	Mercury
1981	"Too Tight"	40	8	—	25	—	Mercury
1982	"Ain't Nobody, Baby"	—	31	—	—	—	Mercury
1982	"Straight from the Heart"	—	79	—	—	—	Mercury
1982	"Love's Train" / "You Are the One"	—	47	—	—	—	Mercury
1983	"Baby, I'm Hooked (Right into Your Love)"	76	5	—	—	—	Mercury
1983	"Ms. Got-the-Body"	—	15	—	—	—	Mercury
1984	"Don't Let Your Love Grow Cold"	103	33	—	—	—	Mercury
1985	"Electric Lady"	—	4	—	—	—	Mercury
1985	"I'm Leaving Baby"	—	12	—	—	—	Mercury
1985	"Tell Me What (I'm Gonna Do)"	—	47	—	—	—	Mercury
1986	"Burnin' Love"	—	8	—	—	68	Mercury
1986	"She's a Star"	—	80	—	—	—	Mercury
1996	"Throw It Up, Throw It Up"	—	84	—	—	—	Intersound
2014	"Your Night"	—	—	21	—	—	
2015	"I Miss You"	—	—	26	—	—	
"—" denotes releases that did not chart or were not released in that territory.
