= Ardijah =

New Zealand music group

- Origin: South Auckland, Auckland, New Zealand
- Genres: R&B, funk, Polynesian music, psychedelic folk
- Years active: 1979–present
- Label: PolyFonk Productions
- Members: Ryan Monga; Betty-Anne; Rico Tali; Kaitapu Monga; Phil Crown

Ardijah is a music group from Auckland, New Zealand, that formed in 1979. The band is associated with a style it describes as “Polyfonk", combining elements of funk, R&B and Polynesian musical influences.

== History ==
Ardijah formed in 1979 and spent the early part of the eighties playing the Auckland pub and club scene honing their skills as a covers band. They released their first single in 1986, "Give Me Your Number" which was followed in 1987 with "Your Love Is Blind".

A re-vamp of the 1st album came out in late 1988 titled Take a Chance. From this came the singles "Watchin' U" and "Which Way Is Up". Take a Chance held a top 20 position on the sales charts for four months and achieved platinum status in New Zealand.

In 1990, Betty-Anne (lead singer) and Ryan Monga (producer, musical director & bass) along with the band moved to Sydney, taking their sound throughout the pubs and clubs of Australia.

In 1995, after an extensive touring schedule and some worldwide success with their song titled "Gimme Time" in the New Zealand film Once Were Warriors, the band returned to New Zealand.

In 1997, Ardijah released their second album titled Influence on their own label PolyFonk Productions and was distributed in New Zealand on the Metro Marketing label. This was the band's small taste of independence.

In 1999, Warner Music NZ released Ardijah's third album Time in November. Betty-Anne went on to win Top Female Vocalist at the 1999 New Zealand Music Awards.

== Band members ==
- Betty-Anne Monga (vocals, ukulele & percussion) – appointed a Member of the New Zealand Order of Merit, for services to music, in the 2023 New Year Honours
- Ryan Monga (producer, musical director, drums, bass & vocals)
- Rico Tali (alto saxophone, flute, ukulele, guitar & vocals)
- Ryan "Kaitapu" Monga Jr (bass, drums & vocals)
- Phil Crown (keyboards & vocals)
- Karl Benton (keyboards)
- Kolo Hansen (keyboards)

Former members

- Jay Dee (guitar & vocals)
- Richie Campbell (drums)
- James Tuiara (lead vocals & percussion)
- Paul Drury (keyboards)
- Teina Benioni (guitar)
- Tony Nogotautama (vocals & guitar)
- Anthony Grey (keyboards & vocals)
- Adrian Grey (bass)
- Peter Hoera (bass)
- Brinnie Nepia (bass)
- Simon Lynch (keyboards)
- Daniel Waho (sax & vocals)
- Barbara Griffen (keyboards & vocals)
- Neville Schwabe (saxophone, flute, trumpet & electric wind instrument)
- Paul Norman (trumpet)
- Brent Turner (keyboards & sax)
- Anita Schwabe (keyboards)
- Trevor Collings (guitar)
- Louise Hughs (guitar)
- Kelly Kahukiwa (sax)
- Eddie Manukau (guitar)
- Glen Muirhead (keyboards)
- Tim Gaze (guitar)
- Chris Kamzelas (guitar)
- Nicholas McBride (drums)
- Dimitri Vouros (saxophone)
- John Carson (drums)
- Heba Ngati (percussion)
- Rick Robertson (saxophone)
- Saylene Ulberg (keyboards and vocals)
- Robert Wylde (keyboards)
- Mark Steven (keyboards)
- Waylon Toia (WayZ)(Rap/ Vocals)
- Phillip Davis (DJ Philly.D) (Rap/Vocals/DJ)

== Discography ==
=== Albums ===
Year	Title	Details	Peak chart positions	Certifications
Year	Title	Details	NZ	Certifications
1987	Ardijah	Label: Warner Music New Zealand	8	
1988	Take a Chance	Label: Warner Music New Zealand; Catalogue: PFPCD003	8	NZ: Gold
1996	Influence	Label: Poly Fonk productions; Catalogue:	—	
1999	Time	Label: Warner Music New Zealand; Catalogue: PFPCD004	6	NZ: Platinum
2004	Journey (Aere'anga)	Label: Poly Fonk Productions; Catalogue: PFPCD002	—	
2010	The Best Polyfonk	Label: Poly Fonk Productions; Catalogue: PFPCD008	11	
"—" denotes a recording that did not chart or was not released in that territory.

=== Singles ===
Year	Title	Peak chart positions	Certifications	Album
Year	Title	NZ	Certifications	Album
1986	"Give Me Your Number"	15		Take A Chance
1986	"Your Love Is Blind"	14		The Best Polyfonk
1987	"That's the Way"	32		Take A Chance
1987	"Gimme Time"	—		Take A Chance
1987	"Time Makes A Wine"	41		Take A Chance
1987	Jammin'	—		Take A Chance
1988	"Watchin' U"	3	NZ: Gold	Take A Chance
1989	"Which Way Is Up"	—		Take A Chance
1989	"Take Me" / "Thru The Time Door"	12		Influence
1996	"Bad Buzz"	—		Influence
1996	"Oh! Baby"	—		Time
1999	"Love So Right"	—		Time
1999	"Silly Love Songs"	1		Time
1999	"Do To You"	7		Time
1999	"Way Around You"	—		Time
2003	"Moonlighting"	—		Journey (Aere'anga)
"—" denotes a recording that did not chart or was not released in that territory.
