= Our Love (Natalie Cole song) =

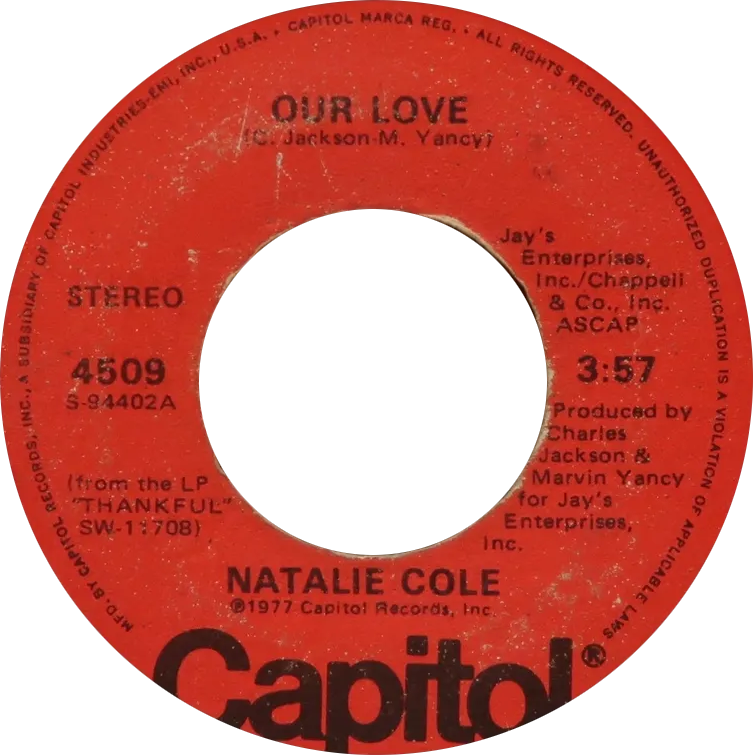
- A-side label of the US single

Single by Natalie Cole

from the album Thankful
- B-side: "La Costa"
- Released: November 6, 1977
- Genre: R&B, soul
- Length: 3:57 (single version); 5:22 (album version)
- Label: Capitol
- Songwriters: Chuck Jackson, Marvin Yancy
- Producers: Chuck Jackson, Marvin Yancy

Natalie Cole singles chronology
"Party Lights" (1977)	"Our Love" (1977)	"Annie Mae" (1978)

"Our Love" is a song by American singer Natalie Cole. Released as a single from her 1977 album Thankful, it spent 2 weeks at number one on the Hot Soul Singles chart in January 1978. It also was a hit on the pop charts, reaching number ten, and has become one of her most familiar songs. It was certified gold in 1978, selling over one million copies.

== Charts ==
=== Weekly charts ===
Chart (1977–1978)	Peak position
Canada RPM Top Singles	11
Canada RPM Adult Contemporary	14
U.S. Billboard Hot 100	10
U.S. Billboard Easy Listening	33
U.S. Billboard Hot Soul Singles	1
U.S. Cash Box Top 100	16

=== Year-end charts ===
Chart (1978)	Rank
Canada RPM Top Singles	117
U.S. Billboard Hot 100	43

== Certifications ==
Region	Certification	Certified units/sales
United States (RIAA)	Gold	1,000,000^{^}
^{^} Shipments figures based on certification alone.

== Cover versions ==
- R&B singer Mary J. Blige covered it on her 1997 album, Share My World.
