= Stargard (group) =

American R&B girl group

- Origin: United States
- Genres: Funk, disco, R&B, soul
- Years active: 1976–1983
- Labels: MCA Records; Warner Bros. Records
- Past members: Rochelle Runnells (deceased); Debra Anderson; Janice Williams

Stargard was an American R&B, funk, and soul girl group.

== Overview ==
At the group's inception Stargard's members were Rochelle Runnells, Debra Anderson, and Janice Williams. The vocal trio issued the "Theme Song from 'Which Way Is Up'" on the soundtrack of the 1977 feature film Which Way Is Up? The Norman Whitfield-penned track also was on Stargard's self-titled debut album released in 1978 on MCA Records. The album rose to numbers 12 and 26 upon the Top R&B Albums and Billboard 200 charts respectively. As a single "Which Way Is Up" rose to numbers 1, 12, & 21 on Billboard's Hot R&B Songs, Dance Club Songs, and Hot 100. "Which Way Is Up" also reached No. 19 on the UK Singles chart.

During 1978 Stargard released their second album entitled What You Waitin' For. The LP's title track reached No. 4 on Hot Soul Songs. The group then switched to Warner Bros. Records where in 1979 their third LP The Changing of the Gard, was issued. The album was co-produced by Verdine White of Earth, Wind, & Fire. As a single "Wear It Out" rose to no. 4 on Dance Club Songs. Stargard also lent background vocals to Junior Walker's 1979 album Back Street Boogie.

Anderson went on to leave Stargard shortly after the release of The Changing of the Gard. With now only Williams and Runnells in tow the duo released their Whitfield-produced fourth album entitled Back 2 Back in 1980. Then they returned to MCA, upon which their fifth LP Nine Lives was issued in 1982.

Rochelle Runnells died in 2012.

== Media appearances ==
Stargard appeared as 'The Diamonds' in the 1978 feature film Sgt. Pepper's Lonely Hearts Club Band.

== Discography ==
=== Studio albums ===
Year	Title	Peak chart positions			Record label
Year	Title	US	US R&B	CAN	Record label
1978	Stargard	26	12	25	MCA
1978	What You Waitin' For	—	50	—	MCA
1979	The Changing of the Gard	—	57	—	Warner Bros.
1981	Back 2 Back	186	—	—	Warner Bros.
1982	Nine Lives	—	—	—	MCA
"—" denotes a recording that did not chart or was not released in that territory.

=== Singles ===
Year	Single	Peak chart positions								Album
Year	Single	US	US R&B	US Dan	AUS	CAN	NLD	NZ	UK	Album
1977	"Theme Song from 'Which Way Is Up'"	21	1	12	79	24	20	7	19	Stargard
1978	"Disco Rufus"	88	—	—	—	—	—	—	—	Stargard
1978	"Love Is So Easy"	—	75	—	—	—	—	—	45	Stargard
1978	"What You Waitin' For"	—	4	—	—	—	—	—	39	What You Waitin' For
1978	"Sensuous Woman"	—	81	—	—	—	—	—	—	What You Waitin' For
1979	"Wear It Out"	—	43	4	—	—	—	—	—	The Changing of the Gard
1979	"Runnin' from the Law"	—	61	—	—	—	—	—	—	The Changing of the Gard
1981	"High on the Boogie"	—	70	59	—	—	—	—	—	Back 2 Back
1981	"Back to the Funk"	—	—	—	—	—	—	—	—	Back 2 Back
1982	"True Love"	—	—	—	—	—	—	—	—	Nine Lives
"—" denotes a recording that did not chart or was not released in that territory.
