= Ffun =

1977 single by Con Funk Shun

"Ffun" is a hit single by American R&B/funk band Con Funk Shun. It was written by Michael Cooper and produced by Skip Scarborough, and performed

== Background ==
Released from their Secrets album, it spent two weeks at number one on the R&B singles chart the first two weeks in January 1978. It also crossed over to the pop charts, peaking at number 23 on the Billboard Hot 100.

== Chart performance ==
Chart (1977–78)	Peak position
US Billboard Hot 100	23
US Hot Soul Singles (Billboard)	1
