= Theme Song from 'Which Way Is Up' =

Single by Stargard

from the album Stargard
- B-side: "Disco Rufus"
- Released: 1977
- Genre: Funk, disco, R&B, soul
- Length: 3:10 (7" version); 7:00 (Album version)
- Label: MCA
- Songwriter: Norman Whitfield
- Producer: Mark Davis

Stargard singles chronology
| "Theme Song from 'Which Way Is Up'" (1977) | "Disco Rufus" (1978) |

"Theme Song from 'Which Way Is Up'" was a hit song by R&B female vocal group Stargard. The song was written by Norman Whitfield and produced by Mark Davis. It was the main theme from the soundtrack to the Richard Pryor movie, Which Way Is Up? It was also included on the group's self-titled debut album. It spent two weeks at number one on the R&B charts in February, 1978 and peaked at number twenty-one on the Billboard Hot 100 singles chart. The single also peaked at number twelve on the disco charts.

== Charts ==
| Chart (1977/78) | Peak position |
|---|---|
| Australia (Kent Music Report) | 79 |
| United States (Billboard Hot 100) | 21 |
| The Netherlands | 20 |

== Cover Versions ==
In 1999, Marcia Hines recorded a version for her album Time of Our Lives.
