= 10 Things I Hate About You =

1999 film by Gil Junger

- Theatrical release poster
- Directed by: Gil Junger
- Written by: Karen McCullah Lutz; Kirsten Smith
- Based on: The Taming of the Shrew by William Shakespeare
- Produced by: Andrew Lazar
- Starring: Julia Stiles; Heath Ledger; Joseph Gordon-Levitt; Larisa Oleynik; Larry Miller; Andrew Keegan; David Krumholtz; Susan May Pratt; Gabrielle Union; Allison Janney
- Cinematography: Mark Irwin
- Edited by: O. Nicholas Brown
- Music by: Richard Gibbs
- Production companies: Touchstone Pictures; Mad Chance; Jaret Entertainment
- Distributed by: Buena Vista Pictures Distribution
- Release date: March 31, 1999
- Running time: 97 minutes
- Country: United States
- Language: English
- Budget: $13 million
- Box office: $53.5 million

10 Things I Hate About You is a 1999 American teen romantic comedy directed by Gil Junger (in his directorial debut) from a screenplay by Karen McCullah Lutz and Kirsten Smith. Adapted from William Shakespeare's comedy The Taming of the Shrew, it stars Julia Stiles, Heath Ledger, Joseph Gordon-Levitt, Larisa Oleynik, Larry Miller, Andrew Keegan, David Krumholtz, Susan May Pratt, Gabrielle Union, and Allison Janney.

In the film, high-school student Cameron James (Gordon-Levitt) is unable to date sophomore Bianca Stratford (Oleynik) until her asocial feminist senior sister Kat (Stiles) dates, leading to Cameron recruiting bad boy classmate Patrick Verona (Ledger) to date Kat.

Development on 10 Things I Hate About You began once Lutz and Smith completed the screenplay in November 1997, with Junger attached to direct soon after. He sought to cast lesser profile actors for the film's lead roles; Stiles joined after several actors declined the role, while Ledger was cast three-and-a-half weeks prior to the start of principal photography, which took place between June and August 1998 in Tacoma and Seattle.

Theatrically released in the United States on March 31, 1999, by Buena Vista Pictures Distribution, the film received generally positive reviews from critics, who praised its screenplay and the performances of Stiles, Ledger and Gordon-Levitt; the film provided them with their breakthrough roles. It was also a commercial success, grossing $53.5 million worldwide against a $13 million budget. In later years, the film gained praise for its themes and characters, becoming a cult classic and one of the best teen romantic comedies of all time.

== Plot ==
Cameron James, a new student at Padua High School in the Seattle area, becomes smitten with beautiful and popular sophomore Bianca Stratford. Geeky Michael Eckman warns him she is vapid and conceited, and that her overprotective single father Walter, an obstetrician worried about teenage pregnancy, has forbidden her or her shrewish older sister Kat, a senior, to date until they graduate. Frustrated by Bianca's insistence and Kat's rebelliousness, Walter declares that Bianca may date only when Kat does, knowing Kat's unsocial attitude will make it very difficult.

When Cameron asks Bianca out, she informs him of her father's new rule and suggests he find someone willing to date Kat; unknown to Cameron, Bianca wants to date affluent and popular senior Joey Donner.

Cameron selects Australian "bad boy" Patrick Verona. Michael convinces Joey to pay Patrick to ask out Kat. Patrick agrees, but Kat rebuffs his first few advances. After Michael and Cameron probe Bianca for information on Kat's likes and dislikes, he begins to win Kat's interest. Kat goes to a party with Patrick, enabling Bianca and her best friend Chastity Church to tag along.

At the party, Kat becomes upset upon seeing Bianca with Joey, responding by getting drunk. Patrick attends to her, and after leaving the party, she starts to open up to him, expressing her interest in forming a band. When Kat attempts to kiss him, Patrick pulls away, causing her to depart, infuriated and embarrassed. Meanwhile, Bianca upsets Cameron by ignoring him for Joey, but she soon realizes that Joey is shallow and self-absorbed. When she asks Cameron to drive her home, he calls her selfish for the way she treated him and says his feelings for her are true. Bianca kisses him before leaving.

Joey pays Patrick more money to take Kat to the prom so he can take Bianca. Although Kat is still angry with Patrick, he wins her over by serenading her with a performance of "Can't Take My Eyes Off You" by Frankie Valli, and she returns the favor by helping him sneak out of detention. Their subsequent date turns romantic and they kiss, but she becomes suspicious when he insists she accompany him to the prom, which she adamantly opposes.

Irritated that Cameron has delayed asking her to the prom, Bianca accepts Joey's invitation, but Walter declines to allow it unless Kat accompanies her. Kat confesses to Bianca that she dated Joey when they were freshmen and, succumbing to peer pressure, had sex with him once and regretted it. After Joey dumped her, she vowed against doing things out of peer pressure, and stays unsocial to protect Bianca. Importantly, Kat's brief relationship with Joey happened close to the time in which Kat and Bianca's estranged mother left them.

Bianca insists that she should be able to have her own experiences, so Kat decides to go to the prom with Patrick. This lets Bianca go as well, and she attends the prom with Cameron instead of Joey. At the prom, Bianca learns from Chastity that Joey was planning to have sex with Bianca that night, and had made a bet about it with his friends. Angry that Bianca spurned him for Cameron, Joey confronts Patrick, revealing that he had paid Patrick to date Kat and leaving her heartbroken. Joey punches Cameron, but Bianca punches and beats him for hitting Cameron, hurting Kat’s feelings, and for trying to use her.

The following day, Bianca reconciles with Kat, and is now officially dating Cameron. For an assignment in which the students were tasked to write their own versions of William Shakespeare's Sonnet 141, Kat reads aloud her version, entitled "10 Things I Hate About You", revealing that she still cares for Patrick. He surprises her with a Fender Stratocaster that he bought with the money Joey paid him, and confesses that he has fallen for her. Kat forgives him, and they reconcile with a kiss.

== Cast ==
- Julia Stiles as Katarina "Kat" Stratford, the antisocial and shrewish older Stratford sister (based upon Katherina Minola)
- Heath Ledger as Patrick Verona, the Australian "bad boy" hired to date Kat (based upon Petruchio)
- Joseph Gordon-Levitt as Cameron James, the new student at Padua High School who is smitten with Bianca and goes to great lengths to win her over (based upon Lucentio)
- Larisa Oleynik as Bianca Stratford, the superficial and popular younger Stratford sister (based upon Bianca Minola)
- Larry Miller as Walter Stratford, an obstetrician and single parent who is overprotective of his daughters (based upon Baptista Minola)
- Andrew Keegan as Joey Donner, an affluent and self-absorbed high school senior and aspiring model who intends to have sex with Bianca, and to that end pays Patrick to date Kat (based upon Hortensio)
- David Krumholtz as Michael Eckman, a geek who assists Cameron in his quest to woo Bianca, and in the process tries to woo Kat's friend Mandella (based upon Tranio)
- Susan May Pratt as Mandella Widows, Kat's only close friend and an aficionado of William Shakespeare who falls for Michael (based upon the Widow character)
- Daryl "Chill" Mitchell as Mr. Morgan, teacher of Kat, Patrick, and Joey's English class
- Allison Janney as Ms. Perky, Padua High School's guidance counselor and a writer of erotic literature
- David Leisure as Mr. Chapin, coach of the girls' soccer team
- Gabrielle Union as Chastity Church, Bianca's best friend who later becomes her enemy
- Greg Jackson as "Scurvy", a friend of Patrick
- Kyle Cease as Bogey Lowenstein, a golf enthusiast and member of a clique of aspiring MBAs
- The band Letters to Cleo (singer Kay Hanley, guitarists Greg McKenna and Michael Eisenstein, bassist Scott Riebling, and drummer Jason Sutter) appears as the band performing at Club Skunk, playing their songs "Come On" and "Co-Pilot", and a cover of Cheap Trick's "I Want You to Want Me" on the school's rooftop during the closing credits. Hanley and Eisenstein also appear in the prom scene, performing a cover of Nick Lowe's "Cruel to Be Kind" with Save Ferris.
- The band Save Ferris (singer Monique Powell, guitarist Brian Mashburn, bassist Bill Uechi, trumpeter José Castellaños, trombonist Brian Williams, saxophonist Eric Zamora, and drummer Evan Kilbourne) appears as the band performing at the prom, playing their songs "I Know" and "Can't Stop" as well as covers of The Isley Brothers' "Shout" and Nick Lowe's "Cruel to Be Kind".

== Production ==
=== Background ===
Writing duo Karen McCullah Lutz and Kirsten Smith were inspired to write 10 Things I Hate About You after watching Clueless (1995). Being a fan of teen films, the pair set out to find a classic play or myth to turn it into a contemporary high-school movie, eventually settling on The Taming of the Shrew, a comedy by William Shakespeare. They wanted to write a strong-willed, feminist character. Patrick Verona was inspired by Judd Nelson's character in The Breakfast Club (1985). The script was finalized in November 1997. The screenplay was eventually picked up by The Walt Disney Company, with Gil Junger attached to direct. According to the website Mental Floss "During a Q&A with the screenwriters, Karen McCullah revealed where the title came from. “The title is based on a diary entry I made in high school,” she explained. “I had a boyfriend named Anthony that I was frequently unhappy with. I made a list called Things I Hate About Anthony. When Kirsten [Smith] and I decided to write this, I went through all of my high school diaries to bone up on the angsty memories, and when I told her about that list, she was like, ‘That’s our title.’”

=== Casting ===
Junger was keen to find unknown actors for the movie. Josh Hartnett and Ashton Kutcher were in the running to play Patrick Verona. Eliza Dushku auditioned for the role of Kat Stratford. Katie Holmes was also considered for the role. Kate Hudson was offered the part but her mother, Goldie Hawn, did not like the script, so she passed on the role. Casting director Marcia Ross contacted Junger and recommended Julia Stiles for the role. Junger met her that evening and was "immediately taken"; after the 10 minute meeting, he gave her the role. Joseph Gordon-Levitt auditioned for the roles of Cameron and Michael, despite initial reluctance to act in a "high school film". The role of Michael eventually went to David Krumholtz and Gordon-Levitt was then offered the role of Cameron. Casting for Patrick Verona was a long process, with Andrew Lazar reporting he had seen over 1,000 boys for the role. Three and a half weeks before filming was due to start, Ross brought Heath Ledger into a casting session, and Junger was immediately inspired by him.

=== Filming ===
Filming took place in 1998, between June 8 and August 6. Many of the scenes were filmed on location at Stadium High School and at a house in the North End of Tacoma, Washington. The prom sequence was shot over three days in Seattle. Ledger's singing scene in the high-school bleachers, regarded as one of the most iconic scenes of the movie, had just three takes. The song for the scene changed numerous times, almost being "I Touch Myself" by Australian rock band Divinyls, before "Can't Take My Eyes Off You" by Frankie Valli was settled on.

Costume designer Kimberly Tillman designed original dresses for Larisa Oleynik and Julia Stiles, as well as the period outfits for Susan May Pratt and David Krumholtz. Gabrielle Union's snakeskin prom dress is a Betsey Johnson design. Heath Ledger's and Joseph Gordon-Levitt's vintage tuxedos came from Isadora's in Seattle.

== Reception ==
=== Box office ===
In its opening weekend, the film grossed $8.3 million in 2,271 theaters domestically, finishing second at the box office, behind The Matrix. It earned $21 million in the first five days of release. The movie grossed a total of $38.2 million in the U.S. and Canada, and $15.3 million in other territories, for $53.7 million worldwide.

=== Critical response ===
On review aggregator Rotten Tomatoes, the film holds an approval rating of 73% based on 91 reviews, with an average rating of 6.3 / 10 . The website's critics consensus states: "Julia Stiles and Heath Ledger add strong performances to an unexpectedly clever script, elevating 10 Things (slightly) above typical teen fare." Metacritic assigned the film a weighted average score of 70 out of 100, based on 26 critics, indicating "generally favorable" reviews. Audiences polled by CinemaScore gave the film an average grade of "B+" on an A+ to F scale.

Geoff Andrew from Time Out praised the film's leads, writing, "Stiles grows into her character, and Ledger is effortlessly charming." Brad Laidman of Film Threat said the film was "pure of heart and perfectly executed." Ron Wells, also of Film Threat, wrote, "Of all the teen films released this year, this one is, by far, the best." Roger Ebert gave the film two and a half stars out of four, saying that he "liked the movie's spirit, the actors and some of the scenes. The music, much of it by the band Letters to Cleo, is subtle and inventive while still cheerful. The movie almost but not quite achieves liftoff against the gravitational pull of the tired story formula." Entertainment Weekly put the film 49th on its list of Best High School Movies. The costuming was praised by Vogue for being stylish and helping illustrate the divide between the Stratford sisters, referring to the movie as a "time capsule" for 90s fashion.

=== Accolades ===
10 Things I Hate About You provided breakthrough roles for Stiles, Ledger, and Gordon-Levitt. Gordon-Levitt, Stiles, and Oleynik each received YoungStar Award nominations for Best Actor/Actress in a Comedy Film. The movie was nominated for seven Teen Choice Awards: Choice Movie: Breakout Star (Stiles), Choice Movie: Comedy, Choice Movie: Funniest Scene (featuring Krumholtz), Choice Movie: Love Scene (featuring Stiles and Ledger), Choice Movie: Hissy Fit (Gordon-Levitt), Choice Movie: Villain (Andrew Keegan) and Choice Movie: Soundtrack at the 1999 Teen Choice Awards. The film's casting directors Marcia Ross and Donna Morong were nominated for Best Casting for Feature Film, Comedy at the Casting Society of America's Artios Awards in 1999. In 2000, Stiles won the Chicago Film Critics Association Award for Most Promising Actress (tied with Émilie Dequenne in Rosetta) at the 1999 CFCA Awards and an MTV Movie Award for Breakthrough Female Performance at the 2000 MTV Movie Awards. Ledger was also nominated for an MTV Movie Award for Best Musical Performance for the song "Can't Take My Eyes Off You".

== Soundtrack ==
The film's soundtrack album, featuring Letters to Cleo performing cover versions of Cheap Trick's "I Want You to Want Me" and Nick Lowe's "Cruel to Be Kind", stayed on the Billboard 200 chart for seven weeks, peaking at no. 52. Reviewer S. Peeples of AllMusic rated it 3 stars out of 5, calling it "one of the best modern rock soundtracks of the spring 1999 season".

No.	Title	Writer(s)	Performer	Length
1.	"I Want You to Want Me" (originally performed by Cheap Trick)	Rick Nielsen	Letters to Cleo	3:25
2.	"F.N.T. (Fascinating New Thing)" (from Great Divide, 1996)	Dan Wilson, Jacob Slichter	Semisonic	3:29
3.	"I Know" (contains an interpretation of "Shout", written by O'Kelly Isley, Ronald Isley, and Rudolph Isley and originally performed by The Isley Brothers)	Michael Holton, Miré Molner, Brian Mashburn	Save Ferris	2:52
4.	"Your Winter" (from Fortress, 2000)	Ken Block, Jett Beres, Andrew Copeland, Ryan Newell, Mark Trojanowski, Bill Smith	Sister Hazel	4:39
5.	"Even Angels Fall" (from Key of a Minor, 2000)	Tom Whitlock, Jessica Riddle, Kim Bullard, Penny Framstad	Jessica Riddle	3:27
6.	"New World" (from Leroy, 2001)	Leroy Miller	Leroy	3:02
7.	"Saturday Night"	Rodney Jerkins, Marti Sharron, Dan Sembello	Ta-Gana	4:26
8.	"Atomic Dog" (from Computer Games, 1982)	George Clinton, Garry Shider, David Spradley	George Clinton	4:44
9.	"Dazz" (from Good High, 1976)	Ray Ransom, Edward D. Irons Jr., Reginald Hargis	Brick	3:24
10.	"The Weakness in Me" (from Walk Under Ladders, 1981)	Joan Armatrading	Joan Armatrading	3:32
11.	"War" (from "My Favourite Game", 1998)	Peter Svensson, Nina Persson	The Cardigans	3:57
12.	"Wings of a Dove" (1983)	Carl Smyth, Graham McPherson	Madness	3:00
13.	"Cruel to Be Kind" (originally performed by Nick Lowe)	Nick Lowe, Ian Gomm	Letters to Cleo	3:01
14.	"One More Thing"	Richard Gibbs	Richard Gibbs	3:01
Total length:				49:59

=== Certifications ===
Region	Certification	Certified units/sales
Australia (ARIA)	Gold	35,000^{^}
United Kingdom (BPI)	Silver	60,000^{*}
United States (RIAA)	Gold	500,000^{^}
^{*} Sales figures based on certification alone.^{^} Shipments figures based on certification alone.

== Legacy and cultural impact ==
The film is often considered one of the greatest teen and romantic comedies of all time, receiving praise for subverting expectations and having a feminist lead character. The film has been cited as an influence for Netflix's romcom revival. Kat's defiance for conventional feminine attitudes was seen as an "extreme" brand of feminism at the time; however, the independent female character is now retrospectively regarded as a progressive portrayal that challenged the traditional teen movie archetypes, aligning more closely with modern feminist ideals. The film is often regarded to be a cult classic due to the unconventional stereotypes resonating throughout generations and in youth culture years later. Teen Vogue ranked the movie number one on their list for best teen romance movies. GQ included the film on their list of the best 90s movies, and Harper's Bazaar had it on their list of the best movies that defined the 90s.

In 2024, during the Drake–Kendrick Lamar feud, Drake responded to Lamar's diss track "Euphoria" by sharing a clip of the movie on Instagram, showing Stiles reading her poem.

=== Adaptations ===
In June 1999, the Scholastic Corporation published a novelization of the story, adapted by David Levithan. The story is retold as it is in the film, with each chapter written from the point of view of either Bianca, Cameron, Kat, Patrick, or Michael.

In October 2008, ABC Family ordered a pilot episode of 10 Things I Hate About You, a half-hour, single-camera comedy series based on the film. Larry Miller is the only actor from the film to reprise his role of Walter Stratford in the TV series. The director of the film, Gil Junger, directed many of the episodes, including the pilot; the film's composer, Richard Gibbs, also returned to do the show's music. The series was adapted and produced by Carter Covington. The show premiered on 7 July 2009, and ended on 24 May 2010, lasting 20 episodes.

=== Musical adaptation ===
In April 2025, it was announced that Lena Dunham and Jessica Huang would be writing the book for a musical stage adaptation of 10 Things I Hate About You, with Carly Rae Jepsen and Ethan Gruska writing the score. The creative team will also include Christopher Wheeldon as director and choreographer and Tom Kitt as music supervisor, arranger, and orchestrator. It was announced on August 17, 2026, that the musical will begin performances on Broadway on August 17, 2027.

== Sequels ==
On the 10th anniversary home video release, the screenwriters mentioned in an audio commentary that they were floating ideas around for 11 Things I Hate About You after the original film’s release. But ultimately, nothing came from it.

In May 2012, a standalone sequel titled 10 Things I Hate About Life was announced to be in development with Gil Junger serving as director and screenwriter. Evan Rachel Wood and Thomas McDonell were cast in the lead roles, and while production commenced principal photography halted with delays in continuing the production. The movie was ultimately shelved indefinitely, resulting in legal action taken by its producers.

In May 2025, a sequel was in development with the title 10 Things I Hate About Dating. Gil Junger is attached to once again serve as director, with the filmmaker co-writing the script with Naya Elle James. Junger stated that similar to the previous movie being a William Shakespeare contemporary retelling, the new project is intended to be based on Jean-Baptiste "Molière" Poquelin's The Misanthrope, or the Cantankerous Lover. The director expressed hopes that cast from the original movie would reprise their roles, in a variety of cameos or as a featured supporting cast alongside the new characters. The movie is intended to be the first in a trilogy of sequels, with the additional projects tentatively titled: 10 Things I Hate About Marriage, and 10 Things I Hate About Kids. Junger acknowledged that while Ledger cannot appear in the new installment, there are plans for reference and tribute to be made to the deceased actor.
