= List of Billboard number-one R&B albums of 1977 =

These are the Billboard magazine R&B albums that reached number one in 1977.

== Chart history ==
Issue date	Album	Artist
January 1	Songs in the Key of Life	Stevie Wonder
January 8	Good High	Brick
January 15	Songs in the Key of Life	Stevie Wonder
January 22	Songs in the Key of Life	Stevie Wonder
January 29	Songs in the Key of Life	Stevie Wonder
February 5	Songs in the Key of Life	Stevie Wonder
February 12	Songs in the Key of Life	Stevie Wonder
February 19	Songs in the Key of Life	Stevie Wonder
February 26	Songs in the Key of Life	Stevie Wonder
March 5	Songs in the Key of Life	Stevie Wonder
March 12	Ask Rufus	Rufus featuring Chaka Khan
March 19	Ask Rufus	Rufus featuring Chaka Khan
March 26	Ask Rufus	Rufus featuring Chaka Khan
April 2	Unpredictable	Natalie Cole
April 9	Unpredictable	Natalie Cole
April 16	Unpredictable	Natalie Cole
April 23	Ahh... The Name Is Bootsy, Baby!	Bootsy's Rubber Band
April 30	Live at the London Palladium	Marvin Gaye
May 7	Live at the London Palladium	Marvin Gaye
May 14	Go for Your Guns	The Isley Brothers
May 21	Commodores	Commodores
May 28	Commodores	Commodores
June 4	Commodores	Commodores
June 11	Commodores	Commodores
June 18	Commodores	Commodores
June 25	Go for Your Guns	The Isley Brothers
July 2	Commodores	Commodores
July 9	Commodores	Commodores
July 16	Commodores	Commodores
July 23	Rejoice	The Emotions
July 30	Rejoice	The Emotions
August 6	Floaters	The Floaters
August 13	Floaters	The Floaters
August 20	Floaters	The Floaters
August 27	Rejoice	The Emotions
September 3	Rejoice	The Emotions
September 10	Rejoice	The Emotions
September 17	Rejoice	The Emotions
September 24	Rejoice	The Emotions
October 1	In Full Bloom	Rose Royce
October 8	Something to Love	L.T.D.
October 15	Something to Love	L.T.D.
October 22	Barry White Sings for Someone You Love	Barry White
October 29	Barry White Sings for Someone You Love	Barry White
November 5	Barry White Sings for Someone You Love	Barry White
November 12	Brick	Brick
November 19	Brick	Brick
November 26	Barry White Sings for Someone You Love	Barry White
December 3	In Full Bloom	Rose Royce
December 10	In Full Bloom	Rose Royce
December 17	All 'n All	Earth, Wind & Fire
December 24	All 'n All	Earth, Wind & Fire
December 31	All 'n All	Earth, Wind & Fire

== See also ==
- 1977 in music
- List of Hot Soul Singles number ones of 1977
