= The Nice Guys (soundtrack) =

2016 film score by John Ottman and David Buckley

The Nice Guys (Original Motion Picture Soundtrack)

Film score by John Ottman and David Buckley
- Released: May 13, 2016
- Venues: The Slovak Radio, Bratislava & The Village, Los Angeles
- Genre: Classical
- Length: 44:07
- Label: Lakeshore Records
- Producers: John Ottman, David Buckley, and Joel Silver

John Ottman chronology
X-Men: Days of Future Past (Original Motion Picture Soundtrack) (2014)	The Nice Guys (Original Motion Picture Soundtrack) (2016)	X-Men: Apocalypse (Original Motion Picture Soundtrack) (2016)

David Buckley chronology
Grimsby (Original Motion Picture Soundtrack) (2016)	The Nice Guys (Original Motion Picture Soundtrack) (2016)	Jason Bourne (Original Motion Picture Soundtrack) (2016)

Professional ratings
Review scores
Source	Rating
AllMusic	5/5 stars

The Nice Guys (Original Motion Picture Soundtrack) is a soundtrack by John Ottman and David Buckley for Shane Black's film of the same name. It was released on May 13, 2016, through Lakeshore Records.

== Development ==
John Ottman, who had scored Shane Black's Kiss Kiss Bang Bang, was brought to do the music for The Nice Guys along with David Buckley. Ottman drew inspiration from 1970s shows such as S.W.A.T. and The Dean Martin Show, with The Streets of San Francisco being a particular influence on the main theme. Ottman detailed that the difference to Kiss Kiss Bang Bang was that now the music was more song-driven, with Black stating that the songs would contrast to the neo-noir tone by focusing on mainstream, exuberant songs of the decade.

Lakeshore Records issued soundtrack albums for both the featured music and original score. The soundtrack also got a special collector's edition vinyl designed by Los Angeles-based creative services company iam8bit to create "something that seemed like it was an artifact from the seventies" and also "drew from the fictional world of the movie and give you something tactile you can hold in your hand", with the gatefold being a 3D centerfold of Misty Mountains, and the packaging including posters of Sid Shattuck films and a business card for The Nice Guys Agency.

== Track listing ==
All music is composed by John Ottman & David Buckley.

No.	Title	Length
1.	"Theme from "The Nice Guys""	2:03
2.	"Kids Today"	3:25
3.	"Disco Party Fight"	4:01
4.	"To the Car Show / Amelia?"	1:38
5.	"Pornocchio"	2:25
6.	"A Little Favor"	2:54
7.	"Equanimity"	2:03
8.	"Chet in the Dumps"	2:05
9.	"You Got Her / Easy 20"	1:38
10.	"Helping Blue Face / Car Crash"	3:13
11.	"Meeting John Boy"	3:27
12.	"It's Not a Flight"	2:03
13.	"Cars That Drive Themselves"	1:47
14.	"Yoohoo Delivery / Breaking in"	2:12
15.	"Car Show Shoot Out"	4:44
16.	"Follow the Yellow Dick Road"	1:44
17.	"P.I. Life"	1:50
18.	"Flight of the Bumble Bee / The Right"	0:55
Total length:		44:07

== Additional songs ==
No.	Title	Artist	Length
1.	"Papa Was a Rollin' Stone"	The Temptations	3:20
2.	"Get Down On It"	Kool & The Gang	2:58
3.	"Boogie Oogie Oogie"	A Taste of Honey	5:34
4.	"September"	Earth, Wind & Fire	3:27
5.	"Couldn't Get It Right"	Climax Blues Band	3:03
6.	"Love and Happiness"	Al Green	2:10
7.	"Dazz"	Brick	2:23
8.	"Boogie Wonderland"	Earth, Wind & Fire	4:50
9.	"Jive Talkin'"	Bee Gees	3:45
10.	"Rock and Roll All Nite"	Kiss	2:48
11.	"Ain't Got No Home"	The Band	3:25
12.	"Escape (The Pina Colada Song)"	Rupert Holmes	2:06
13.	"Lonely Boy"	Andrew Gold	4:34
14.	"A Horse With No Name"	America	4:11
15.	"Green Peppers"	Herb Alpert & The Tijuana Brass	1:29
Total length:			50:03

== Accolades ==
The soundtrack was nominated at the 2016 Hollywood Music in Media Awards for "Best Soundtrack Album", but lost to Suicide Squad. It was also nominated at the 2016 International Film Music Critics Association Awards for "Best Original Score for a Comedy Film", but lost to La La Land.

== Personnel ==
Credits adapted from AllMusic

- John Ottman and David Buckley - Music composed and produced by
- Joel Silver - Score and soundtrack producer
- Shane Black - Score and soundtrack executive producer
- Amanda Goodpaster - Editing
- Anthony Lledo - Guitar
- Brian McNelis - Executive producer
- Casey Stone - Score mixer
- Chris Bacon - Arranger
- Chris Chaney - Bass
- Christine Bergren - Licensing
- Dan Goldwasser - Assembly, editing
- Daniel Semsen - Orchestration
- Ed McCormack - Technical assistance
- Edwin Wendler - Arranger
- Eric Craig - A&R
- Eric Liljestrand - Engineer
- Hugh Marsh - Violin (electric)
- James Harrah - Guitar
- Jason Lively - Orchestration
- Jim Monti - Engineer
- John Bergin - Art direction and design
- Marian Turner - Orchestra manager
- Martin Roller - Engineer
- Meghan Currier - Music coordinator
- Michael White - Electric trumpet
- Nolan Livesay - Orchestration
- Paul Talkington - Recording manager
- Peter McCabe - Engineer
- Roger Suen - Technical assistance
- Skip Williamson - Executive producer
