= Key of a Minor =

Studio album by Jessica Riddle
- Released: April 18, 2000
- Genre: Pop, rock
- Length: 40:49
- Label: Hollywood
- Producer: Rob Cavallo, Kim Bullard, Julian Raymond

Jessica Riddle chronology
Key of a Minor (2000)	Chapter 2 (2003)

Professional ratings
Review scores
Source	Rating
Allmusic	3/5 stars

Key of a Minor is the debut album of American singer-songwriter Jessica Riddle, released in 2000.

"Even Angels Fall" was featured in the 1999 movie 10 Things I Hate about You and on its soundtrack.

== Track listing ==
All songs by Jessica Riddle unless otherwise noted.

1. "I Want You" (Riddle, Kim Bullard) – 3:54
2. "Sadly Beautiful" (Paul Westerberg) – 3:07
3. "Symphony" (Riddle, Joseph Broussard, Carrol Washington, Ralph G. Williams) – 3:54
4. "Even Angels Fall" (Riddle, Bullard, Tom Whitlock, Penny Framstad) – 3:26
5. "I'm Sorry" – 4:44
6. "Your Girl" – 2:53
7. "Everything" (Riddle, Bullard) – 4:16
8. "For Wowser" – 4:02
9. "Indifference" (Riddle, Bullard)" – 4:33
10. "Dreams Will Fade" – 3:20
11. "Gone" – 2:40

== Personnel ==
- Jessica Riddle – vocals
- Rusty Anderson – guitar
- Joseph Bishara – loops
- Curt Bisquera – drums, percussion
- Chris Bruce – bass
- Matt Chamberlain – drums
- Davey Faragher – bass
- Steve Farris – guitar
- Stuart Mathis – guitar
- Jamie Muhoberac – keyboards
- John Pierce – bass
- Tim Pierce – guitar
- Michael Ward – guitar
