= Honey Chile (disambiguation) =

Honey Chile is a 1967 single by Motown girl group Martha Reeves and the Vandellas.

Honey Chile may also refer to

- Honeychile, a 1951 American comedy film
- Patricia Wilder (1913–1995), known as "Honey Chile"
- Honeychile Rider, a fictional character in Ian Fleming's James Bond novel Dr. No
- "Honey Chile" features on the soundtrack of Music Is Magic , a 1935 film
- "Honey Chile", B-side of Blueberry Hill by Fats Domino
  - "Honey Chile" by Fats Domino in the soundtrack of Shake, Rattle & Rock! (1956 film)
- "Honey Chile", track on Swinging Kicks, a 1957 album by the jazz arranger Buddy Bregman
- "Honey Chile", track on Brick (Brick album) (1977)
