= Love to the World =

Studio album by L.T.D.
- Released: June 4, 1976
- Studio: The Sound Factory (Los Angeles, California)
- Genre: Soul, funk
- Length: 33:31
- Label: A&M
- Producer: Larry Mizell, Fonce Mizell, Chuck Davis (co.)

L.T.D. chronology
| Gittin' Down (1974) | Love to the World (1976) | Something to Love (1977) |

Professional ratings
Review scores
| Source | Rating |
|---|---|
| AllMusic | 3/5 stars |

Love to the World is the third studio album by Los Angeles, California -based band, L.T.D., released in 1976 on the A&M label.

== Commercial performance ==
The album peaked at No. 7 on the R&B albums chart. It also reached No. 52 on the Billboard 200. The album features the singles "Love Ballad", which peaked at No. 1 on the Hot Soul Singles chart and No. 20 on the Hot 100 Singles chart, and the title track, which charted at No. 27 on the Hot Soul Singles chart and No. 91 on the Billboard Hot 100.

== Track listing ==
All tracks are written by Larry Mizell, Fonce Mizell and Rodney Mizell, except where noted.

Side one
| No. | Title | Length |
|---|---|---|
| 1. | "Love to the World" | 5:07 |
| 2. | "Time for Pleasure" | 5:20 |
| 3. | "Love Ballad" (Skip Scarborough) | 4:35 |

Side two
| No. | Title | Length |
|---|---|---|
| 4. | "Get Your It Together" (Henry Davis, Jeffrey Osborne) | 4:48 |
| 5. | "Let the Music Keep Playing" (Henry Davis) | 4:22 |
| 6. | "The Word" | 5:30 |
| 7. | "Love to the World Prayer" | 3:49 |

== Personnel ==
L.T.D.

- Billy Osborne - piano, organ, ARP and Moog synthesizers, clavinet, lead and background vocals, arrangements
- Jeffrey Osborne - drums, percussion, lead and background vocals, arrangements
- Henry Davis - bass guitar, background vocals, arrangements
- Jimmie Davis - piano, electric and acoustic piano, clavinet, background vocals, arrangements
- Robert Santiel - percussion, arrangements
- John McGhee – guitar, arrangements
- Abraham "Onion" Miller – tenor saxophone, background vocals, arrangements
- Carle Vickers – trumpet, flugelhorn, soprano saxophone, flute, arrangements
- Lorenzo Carnegie – tenor saxophone, alto saxophone, arrangements
- Jake Riley – trombone, arrangements
- Toby Wynn – baritone saxophone, arrangements

Additional personnel

- Larry and Fonce Mizell – producers, arrangements
- Chuck Davis – co-producer, mastering
- Jim Nipar – engineer
- Serge Reyes – engineer
- Kevin Gray – mastering
- Bernorce Blackman – guitar
- Wade Marcus – string arrangements
- Charles Veal - concertmaster
- Barbara Dice, Carolyn Dice, John "Bunky" Butler - children's voices (track 7)

== Charts ==
Album

| Chart (1976) | Peaks |
|---|---|
| U.S. Billboard Top LPs | 52 |
| U.S. Billboard Top Soul LPs | 7 |

Singles

| Year | Single | Peaks | |
| Year | Single | US | US R&B |
|---|---|---|---|
| 1976 | "Love Ballad" | 20 | 1 |
| 1977 | "Love to the World" | 91 | 27 |
