= For You (L.T.D. album) =

Studio album by L.T.D.
- Released: September 17, 1983
- Genre: Funk
- Length: 37:10
- Language: English
- Label: Montage
- Producer: Jimmie Davis; Jake Riley; Carle Vickers

L.T.D. chronology
Love Magic (1981)	For You (1983)	Marry You (1999)

For You is the ninth studio album by American funk group L.T.D., their sole release on Montage. It was released on September 17, 1983.

== Reception ==
Editors at AllMusic Guide scored this album 2.5 out of five stars, with critic Amy Hanson writing that the group was still suffering from the loss of vocalist Jeffrey Osborne in 1980 and that the songs have "lackadaisical intent".

== Track listing ==
Side one
No.	Title	Writer(s)	Length
1.	"For You"	Joe Russo	4:18
2.	"Stop on By"	Jake Riley and Carle Vickers	5:26
3.	"Is It Over"	Alvino Bennett and Andre Ray	5:10
4.	"Steppin' Out (Wid Ma Baby)"	Bennett, Jimmie Davis, Robert D. Palmer, Ray, Riley, and Leslie Wilson	4:37

Side two
No.	Title	Writer(s)	Length
5.	"Slick"	Ray, Riley, and Vickers	4:37
6.	"Caught in the Middle of Goodbye"	Jim Andron and Mark Winkler	4:20
7.	"Whatcha Gonna Do"	Henry Davis and June D. Wells	4:10
8.	"Party with You (All Night)"	Doni Hagen, Palmer, and Vickers	4:32

== Personnel ==
L.T.D.

- Alvino Bennett – percussion
- Arthur "Lorenzo" Carnegie – alto and tenor saxophone, flute, guitar
- Jimmie "J. D." Davis – keyboards, vocals, production
- Henry E. Davis – bass guitar, vocals
- Andre Ray – lead vocals
- Jake Riley – trombone, production
- Carle Vickers – trumpet, flute, soprano sax, production
- Leslie Wilson – lead vocals

Additional personnel

- Cliff Boulé – illustration
- Les D. Cooper – engineering, mixing
- Tim Dennen – assistant engineering
- Douglas Joseph – art direction
- Robert D. Palmer – guitar

== Chart performance ==
For You reached 66 on Billboard's R&B Albums chart.

== See also ==
- List of 1983 albums
