= Love Ballad (L.T.D. song) =

1976 single by L.T.D.

Single by L.T.D.

from the album Love To The World
- B-side: "Let the Music Keep Playing"
- Released: September 1976
- Genre: R&B; quiet storm
- Length: 4:35
- Label: A&M
- Songwriter: Skip Scarborough
- Producer: Larry Mizell & Fonce Mizell

L.T.D. singles chronology
"Love Ballad" (1976)	"Love to the World" (1976)

"Love Ballad" is a song by R&B/Funk band L.T.D. Jeffrey Osborne is the lead singer.

Released from their album Love to the World, it spent two weeks at number one on the R&B singles chart in November 1976, and peaked at number 20 on the Billboard Hot 100 singles chart.

== Weekly charts ==
Chart (1976)	Peak position
Canada RPM Top Singles	38
US Billboard Hot 100	20
US Billboard R&B	1
US Cash Box Top 100	22

== George Benson version ==
"Love Ballad"

Single by George Benson

from the album Livin' Inside Your Love
- B-side: "You're Never Too Far From Me"
- Released: February 1979
- Genre: R&B
- Length: 4:16 (single version); 5:15 (album version)
- Label: Warner
- Songwriter: Skip Scarborough
- Producer: Tommy LiPuma

George Benson singles chronology
"On Broadway" (1978)	"Love Ballad" (1979)	"Give Me the Night" (1980)

George Benson released an up-tempo rendition of "Love Ballad" in 1979. It peaked at number three on the R&B charts and number 18 on the Billboard Hot 100. It also reached number 12 on the Adult Contemporary chart. Benson's cover is the most successful version of the song.

Weekly charts

Chart (1979)	Peak position
Canada RPM Top Singles	29
Canada RPM Adult Contemporary	25
Canada RPM Dance/Urban	22
UK Singles Chart (OCC)	29
US Billboard Hot 100	18
US Billboard Adult Contemporary	12
US Billboard R&B Singles	3
US Cash Box Top 100	14

== Later versions ==
- Tanya Blount did a well-received cover of the song on her debut album in 1993.
- K-Ci & JoJo covered this song on their 1997 album Love Always.
- Covered by Jeffrey Osborne and is on his 2001 Love Songs compilation album, as did with Osborne's then-drummer and frontman L.T.D.'s first Greatest Hits album in 1996 as well as the live version as the closing track from Osborne's 2000 studio album That's for Sure.
- J Dilla sampled this song for De La Soul in 2004 on their LP The Grind Date.
- R&B singer Ciara sampled the song on her 2004 debut album Goodies.
- Patti LaBelle covered the song on her 2005 album of covers, Classic Moments.
- Kenny Lattimore and Chanté Moore covered the song on their 2006 album Uncovered.
- The Temptations covered "Love Ballad" on their 2007 album Back to Front.
- Drum and Bass producer Netsky sampled the song on his single "Love Has Gone" from his second album 2 released in 2012.
- Osborne's longtime collaborator George Duke made a version of the song 1989 on his album Night After Night.
- August Alsina sampled the song for the track "You Deserve" from his debut album Testimony which was released in 2014.
- Gary Bartz covered the song on his 1977 album, Music is My Sanctuary.
