= Shine On (L.T.D. album) =

Studio album by L.T.D.
- Released: August 12, 1980
- Studio: Monterey Sound Studios (Glendale, California)
- Genre: Soul, funk
- Label: A&M
- Producer: Bobby Martin

L.T.D. chronology
| Devotion (1979) | Shine On (1980) | Love Magic (1981) |

Professional ratings
Review scores
| Source | Rating |
|---|---|
| AllMusic | 3/5 stars |

Shine On is the seventh studio album by Los Angeles, California -based band, L.T.D., released in 1980 on the A&M label. This was the last album to feature frontman Jeffrey Osborne and his brother Billy Osborne, as they quit the group to start solo careers a year later.

== Chart performance ==
The album reached at number 28 on the Billboard Top LPs chart and number 6 on the Soul LPs chart. The single "Where Did We Go Wrong" peaked at number 7 on the Hot Soul Singles chart, while the title track, peaked at number 19 on the same chart as well as number 40 on the Billboard Hot 100.

== Track listing ==
Side one
| No. | Title | Writer(s) | Length |
|---|---|---|---|
| 1. | "You Gave Me Love" | Len Ron Hanks, Zane Grey | 4:32 |
| 2. | "Where Did We Go Wrong" | Sam Dees, Jeffrey Osborne | 4:30 |
| 3. | "Getaway" | Henry E. Davis, Jeffrey Osborne | 4:28 |
| 4. | "Will Love Grow" | Jimmie Davis, Jeffrey Osborne | 4:21 |

Side two
| No. | Title | Writer(s) | Length |
|---|---|---|---|
| 5. | "Love Is What You Need" | John T. McGhee, Jeffrey Osborne | 4:14 |
| 6. | "Shine On" | Richard Kerr, Jeffrey Osborne, Billy Osborne | 3:58 |
| 7. | "Lovers Everywhere" | Jeffrey Osborne | 3:51 |
| 8. | "Lady Love" | Billy Osborne | 3:40 |
| 9. | "Don'tcha Know" | Jeffrey Osborne, Kenny Amos | 3:56 |

== Personnel ==
L.T.D.

- Alvino M. Bennett – acoustic drums, percussion
- Lorenzo Carnegie – alto and tenor saxophones, percussion
- Henry E. Davis – bass guitar, synthesizer, piccolo, background vocals, arrangements (1, 3, 5, 9)
- Jimmie Davis – acoustic and electric piano, clavinet, synthesizer, background vocals, arrangements (6–8), rhythm arrangements (4)
- John T. McGhee – acoustic and electric guitar, rhythm arrangements (5)
- Abraham "Onion" Miller Jr. – tenor saxophone
- Jeffrey L. Osborne – lead and background vocals, percussion, rhythm arrangements (2, 7, 9), vocal arrangements (2–7, 9)
- Billy Osborne – acoustic and electric piano, lead and background vocals, percussion, rhythm and vocal arrangements (8)
- Jake Riley – trombone
- Carle W. Vickers – trumpet, flugelhorn, flute

Guest musicians

- Sneaky Pete Kleinow – steel guitar
- Mark Cargill – concertmaster
- David M. Sherr – oboe
- Sidney Muldrow, Attilio De Palma – French horn
- Angela L. Winbush – background vocals
- Len Ron Hanks – rhythm and vocal arrangements (1)

Technical personnel

- Bobby Martin – producer, arrangements (2, 4)
- Richard Tilles – engineer
- Les Brockmann, Jim Hodson, Marvin Hall – assistant engineers
- Bernie Grundman – mastering

== Charts ==
Album

| Chart (1980) | Peaks |
|---|---|
| U.S. Billboard Top LPs | 28 |
| U.S. Billboard Top Soul LPs | 6 |

Singles

| Year | Single | Peaks | |
| Year | Single | US | US R&B |
|---|---|---|---|
| 1980 | "Where Did We Go Wrong" | — | 7 |
| 1980 | "Shine On" | 40 | 19 |
