= Gittin' Down =

Studio album by L.T.D.
- Released: November 08, 1974
- Recorded: 1974
- Studio: A&M Records Studios, Los Angeles, California
- Genre: Soul, funk
- Label: A&M
- Producer: L.T.D.

L.T.D. chronology
Love, Togetherness & Devotion (1974)	Gittin' Down (1974)	Love to the World (1976)

Professional ratings
Review scores
Source	Rating
Allmusic	3/5 stars

Gittin' Down is the second album release for the Los Angeles, California -based band L.T.D.

== Track listing ==
All tracks are produced and arranged by L.T.D.

1. "Don't Lose Your Cool" - (Henry E. Davis, Jeffrey Osborne) 2:44
2. "Groove for a Little While" - (Jeffrey Osborne) 3:21
3. "Your Love is The Answer" - (Jeffrey Osborne, James Davis) 2:53
4. "Eldorado Joe" - (Henry E. Davis) 4:21
5. "Tryin' to Find a Way" - (Billy Osborne) 3:04
6. "Ain't No Way" - (Billy Osborne, Jeffrey Osborne) 2:47
7. "It's You" - (Lorenzo Carnegie) 3:04
8. "Look in My Eyes" - (Abraham J. Miller Jr., James Davis) 3:17
9. "Churn Baby Churn" - (Abraham J. Miller Jr.) 3:00
10. "Sweet Thang" - (Carle Vickers, Jeffrey Osborne) 2:35
11. "You Can Be Free" - (Jake Riley, James Davis) 5:17

== Personnel ==
L.T.D.

- Jeffrey Osborne - lead vocals (1, 3, 6, 7, 11), drums, background vocals, percussion, piano
- Billy Osborne - lead vocals (5, 6, 10), acoustic piano, clavinet, organ, synthesizer, drums, percussion, background vocals, keyboard solo (4), album coordinator
- Jimmie Davis - lead vocals (8), acoustic and electric piano, clavinet, synthesizer, harpsichord, background vocals, synthesizer solo (11)
- Henry Davis - bass guitar, guitar, celeste, percussion
- Carle Vickers - trumpet, soprano saxophone, background vocals
- Abraham "Onion" Miller Jr. - lead vocals (9), tenor saxophone, background vocals, percussion, tenor saxophone solo (9)
- Lorenzo "Blow Daddy" Carnegie - tenor and alto saxophone, tenor saxophone solo (2)
- Tobie "Big Horny" Wynn - baritone and alto saxophone
- Jake Riley - trombone, percussion
- Pondaza Santiel - congas, bongos, percussion

Technical personnel

- Jerry Butler – executive producer
- Norm Kinney – engineer, mixing
- Tommy Vicari – engineer
- Milt Calice, Dave Iveland – assistant engineers
- Bernie Grundman – mastering

== Charts ==
Chart (1975)	Peak position
Billboard Top R&B Albums	40
