= Devotion (L.T.D. album) =

Studio album by L.T.D.
- Released: 1979
- Studio: Hollywood Sound Recorders (Hollywood, California)
- Genre: Soul, funk
- Label: A&M
- Producer: Bobby Martin

L.T.D. chronology
| Togetherness (1978) | Devotion (1979) | Shine On (1980) |

Devotion is the sixth studio album by American band, L.T.D., released in 1979 through A&M Records. The album peaked at No. 5 on the R&B albums chart. It also reached No. 29 on the Billboard 200. The album features the singles "Dance 'N' Sing 'N'", which peaked at No. 15 on the Hot Soul Singles chart, and "Stranger", which charted at No. 14 on the same chart.

== Critical reception ==
Professional ratings
Review scores
| Source | Rating |
|---|---|
| AllMusic | 2.5/5 stars |

The Bay State Banner wrote that "there are places where the leftover riffs from too-long sessions begin cropping up... Lead singer Jeffery Osborne ... does not get very worked up over the proceedings and the fire never gets lit underneath the L.T.D. band."

== Track listing ==
Side one
| No. | Title | Writer(s) | Length |
|---|---|---|---|
| 1. | "One on One" | John T. McGhee, Abraham J. Miller, Jr., Jeffrey Osborne | 5:18 |
| 2. | "Share My Love" | Alvino M. Bennett, Henry E. Davis | 4:20 |
| 3. | "Stand Up L.T.D." | L.T.D. | 4:43 |
| 4. | "Say That You'll Be Mine" | Jeffrey Osborne, Henry E. Davis | 3:08 |

Side two
| No. | Title | Writer(s) | Length |
|---|---|---|---|
| 5. | "Dance 'N' Sing 'N'" | Jeffrey Osborne, Jake Riley | 5:32 |
| 6. | "Sometimes" | Jeffrey Osborne, William M. Osborne | 3:09 |
| 7. | "Promise You'll Stay" | Jeffrey Osborne, James E. Davis | 3:20 |
| 8. | "Stranger" | Jake Riley, Jeffrey Osborne | 4:29 |
| 9. | "Feel It" | William M. Osborne, Carle W. Vickers | 3:44 |

== Personnel ==
L.T.D.

- Alvino M. Bennett – acoustic and electric drums
- Lorenzo Carnegie – alto and tenor saxophones
- Henry E. Davis – bass guitar, flute, horn arrangements (2, 4)
- James E. Davis – acoustic piano, Yamaha electric piano, background vocals, clavinet, horn arrangements (8, 9), string arrangements (2, 9)
- John McGhee – guitar
- Abraham "Onion" Miller, Jr. – tenor saxophone
- Jeffrey L. Osborne – percussion, lead and background vocals, horn arrangements (8)
- William M. Osborne – organ, lead and background vocals, Fender Rhodes, percussion, horn arrangements (10)
- Jake Riley – trombone, horn arrangements (3, 5)
- Carle W. Vickers – trumpet, flugelhorn, C trumpet, flute, percussion, horn arrangements (10)

Additional musicians

- Paul Shure – concertmaster
- Maurice Spears – bass trombone
- Lorraine G. Johnson – background vocals

Technical personnel

- Bobby Martin – producer, horn arrangements (1, 6, 7), string arrangements (4–8, 10)
- Bob Hughes – engineer, mixing
- G.S. MacMillan – assistant engineer
- Douglas Graves – assistant engineer
- Bernie Grundman – mastering

== Charts ==
Album

| Chart (1979) | Peak position |
|---|---|
| U.S. Billboard Top LPs | 29 |
| U.S. Billboard Top Soul LPs | 5 |

Singles

| Year | Single | Peaks |
| Year | Single | US R&B |
|---|---|---|
| 1979 | "Dance 'N' Sing 'N'" | 15 |
| 1979 | "Share My Love" | 69 |
| 1979 | "Stranger" | 14 |
