= Penny Framstad =

American singer-songwriter

- Born: Penny Rae Framstad; Santa Cruz, California, United States
- Occupations: Singer; songwriter; songwriting teacher
- Children: 1
- Musical career
- Genres: Pop; rock
- Instruments: Vocals; guitar; piano
- Years active: 1980–present
- Labels: Java

Penny Rae Framstad is an American singer and songwriter whose musical style has been generally classified as pop, rock, and singer/songwriter influences. She has shared the stage with The Doobie Brothers, Sixpence None the Richer, and Matt Nathanson, among others and has performed at the House of Blues, The Viper Room, The Catalyst, and the Sweetwater Saloon, among other venues.

== Early life ==
Penny Rae Framstad was born in Santa Cruz, California to parents Raymond and Eula Framstad.

== Career ==
Framstad co-wrote Even Angels Fall, (Kim Bullard, Tom Whitlock, Jessica Riddle) recorded by Jessica Riddle on Hollywood Records appeared in the film, 10 Things I Hate About You, and on the soundtrack, earning her a gold record for album sales of over 500,000 copies. Even Angels Fall, reached #27 on Billboard Adult Pop Songs airplay chart and remained on the chart for 12 weeks. "Fly Away" recorded as a duet by Sara Wasserman and Aaron Neville (written by Framstad and Sara Wasserman) was released in June 2009 on "That Other Label".

=== Penny Framstad Pop Academy ===
Framstad launched the Penny Framstad Pop Academy in Los Angeles in 2001, kwith a focus on songwriting, guitar, piano, live stage performance, and music business classes.

=== Musician's Institute ===
Framstad taught music classes at The Musician's Institute in Hollywood, California during 2016-2017. She specialized in artist development, teaching classes such as, The Song, and The Show, as well as coaching singers in private vocal and songwriting sessions for MI's Independent Artist Program.

== Filmography ==
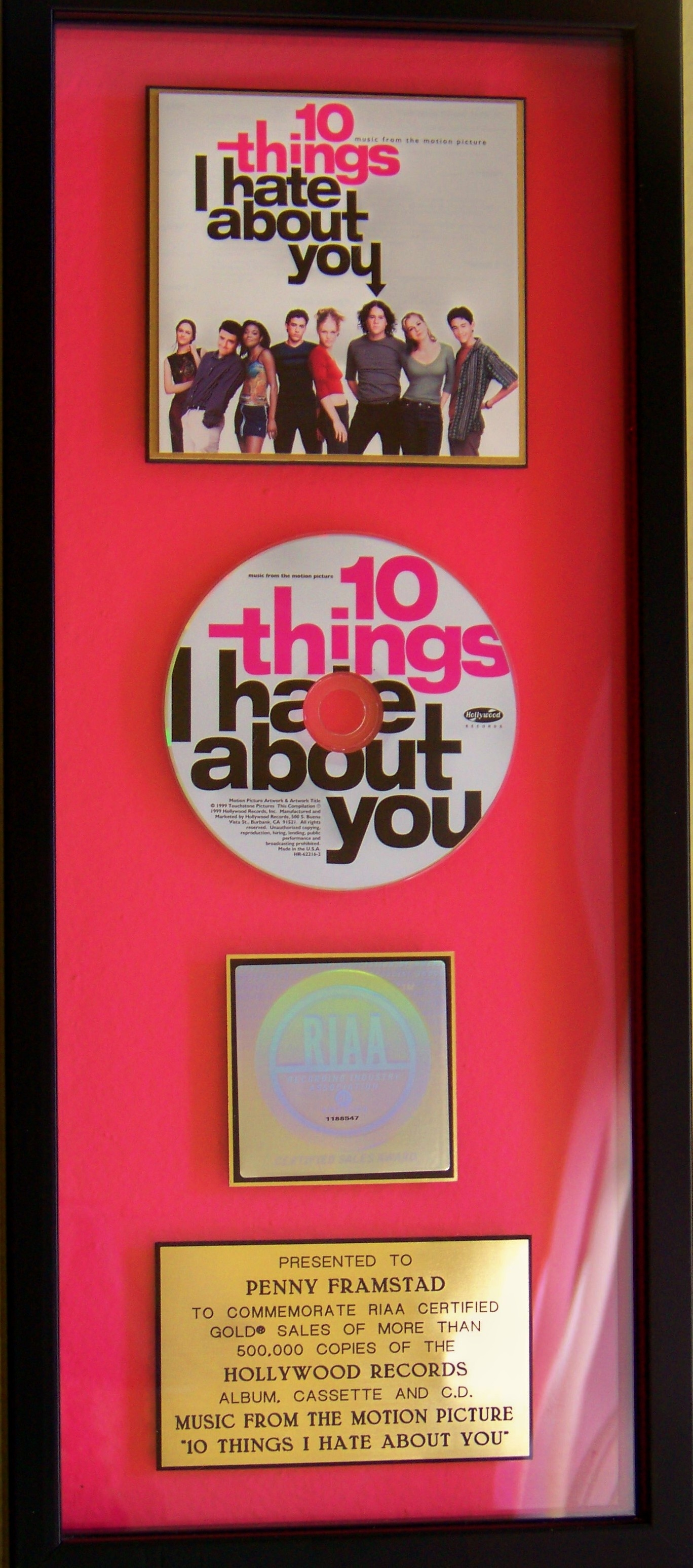
Gold Record for Even Angels Fall in the film 10 Things I Hate About You

- Dance Moms (Lifetime TV Series) 2012 - Episode: 8 - Season 2 - (songwriter: I Think I Like You)
- Scrubs 2007 - (songwriter/performer: The Heart Has a Mind Of Its Own)
- The Office 2007 - (songwriter/performer: The Heart Has a Mind Of Its Own)
- Dawson’s Creek 2005 - (songwriter/performer: Holdin’ On)
- White Chicks (Sony Pictures Film) 2004 - Why, Why, Why - (songwriter/performer)
- Summerland 2004 - Episode 9 - Season 1 (songwriter/performer: Paint the Sky)
- The Real World Paris (MTV Reality TV) 2003 - Episode 13 - (songwriter/performer: "Moth to a Flame")
- The Real World Chicago (MTV Reality TV) 2002 - Episode 1123 - (songwriter/performer: We'd Only Break Each Others Hearts)
- Roswell 2001 - Episode 16 - Season 2 (songwriter/performer: I'll Never Be the Same)
- Providence 2000 - Episode 11 - Season 2 (2000) (songwriter/performer: Nothing to Hide) - Episode 13 - Season 2 (2000) - (songwriter/performer: I'll Never Be the Same)
- 10 Things I Hate About You (Touchstone Film/Soundtrack) 1999 -Even Angels Fall - (songwriter)
