= Jason Bourne (soundtrack) =

Jason Bourne (Original Motion Picture Soundtrack)

Film score by John Powell and David Buckley
- Released: July 29, 2016
- Recorded: 2016
- Studios: Abbey Road Studios, London; RAK Studios, London
- Genre: Film score
- Length: 61:16
- Label: Back Lot Music
- Producer: John Powell

John Powell chronology
Pan (2015)	Jason Bourne (2016)	Ferdinand (2017)

David Buckley chronology
The Nice Guys (2016)	Jason Bourne (2016)	Killing Reagan (2016)

Singles from Jason Bourne (Original Motion Picture Soundtrack)
- 1. "Extreme Ways (Jason Bourne)" Released: July 29, 2016

Jason Bourne (Original Motion Picture Soundtrack) is the film score to the 2016 film Jason Bourne, directed by Paul Greengrass; the fifth installment of the Bourne film series and a direct sequel to The Bourne Ultimatum (2007), it stars Matt Damon reprising his role as the main character, former CIA assassin Jason Bourne. The score was composed by John Powell and David Buckley and released through Back Lot Music on July 29, 2016.

== Background ==
John Powell who composed the original Bourne trilogy returned to score Jason Bourne. The recording of the film commenced after Powell's concert work for the oratorio A Prussian Requiem, which commenced in March 2016 at London commemorating the centennial of World War I, considered Powell's attempt to express his concern regarding the global conflict and its realities; he compared the impact of violence, adding that the titular character was a victim of violence, and was never instigating it in any way.

Powell considered the film as a nice distraction after suffering a personal loss; his wife Melinda Lerner succumbed to myelodysplastic syndrome, the film was dedicated to Lerner's memory. David Buckley served as the co-composer, who helped him scoring the film authentic to the style and tone. Batu Sener provided additional music. A new version of Moby's "Extreme Ways", entitled "Extreme Ways (Jason Bourne)", was recorded for the film's end credits.

== Reception ==
Jonathan Broxton of Movie Music UK wrote "With those mitigating circumstances in mind, to me Jason Bourne feels competent, workmanlike, and consistent with the rest of the music in the Bourne series, but is missing that spark of inspiration that would allow it to rise out of the pit with the literally dozens of other scores that were written as a pale imitation of Bourne in the wake of the first score. Without that level of John Powell magic, sadly, it comes across as little more than a facsimile, rather than an original." Kaya Savas of Film.Music.Media wrote "Bourne will always be some of Powell's most defining scores, and it was fantastic to see a team of support rally behind him to help him make Jason Bourne another great entry in the franchise." James Southall of Movie Wave wrote "It's hard to imagine anyone ever choosing to listen to Jason Bourne over one of the first three scores in the series, but having said that, the material on which it is built is so strong that taken purely on its own terms it is undoubtedly an enjoyable way of spending an hour."

David Chen of /Film wrote "Even John Powell's score feels like a limp retread of his superlative work from the previous films." Todd McCarthy of The Hollywood Reporter found it to be "uninspiring". Robert Abele of TheWrap wrote "The sound design, too, is top notch, as is the propulsive score by John Powell and David Buckley."

== Track listing ==
No.	Title	Length
1.	"I Remember Everything"	2:04
2.	"Backdoor Breach"	3:50
3.	"Converging in Athens"	4:13
4.	"Motorcycle Chase"	6:53
5.	"A Key to the Past"	2:37
6.	"Berlin"	2:02
7.	"Decrypted"	5:34
8.	"Flat Assault"	2:39
9.	"Paddington Plaza"	6:46
10.	"White Van Plan"	2:49
11.	"Las Vegas"	3:48
12.	"Following the Target"	3:29
13.	"Strip Chase"	4:59
14.	"An Interesting Proposal"	2:13
15.	"Let Me Think About It"	2:24
16.	"Extreme Ways (Jason Bourne)" (Moby)	4:56
Total length:		61:16

== Personnel ==
Credits adapted from liner notes:

- Music composer – John Powell, David Buckley
- Music producer – John Powell
- Additional music – Batu Sener
- Arrangements – Batu Sener, Luke Richards
- Programming – Anthony Willis, John Crooks, Luke Richards
- Sound designer – Michael White
- MIDI controller – Logan Stahley
- Recording – Nick Wollage
- Mixing – Shawn Murphy
- Mastering – Patricia Sullivan
- Score editor – Peter Myles, Sally Boldt, Tom Carlson
- Musical assistance – Ed McCormack, Sidney Harrison
- Music supervisor – Rachel Levy
- Executive producer – Michael Knobloch
- Management – Kyle Staggs, Tanya Perara

Orchestra

- Supervising orchestrator – Peter Myles
- Orchestrated By – Geoff Lawson, John Ashton Thomas, Tommy Laurence
- Conductor – Gavin Greenaway
- Contractor – Isobel Griffiths, Lucy Whalley
- Orchestra leader – Emlyn Singleton

Musicians

- Acoustic guitar, keyboards, bass guitar – John Powell
- Percussion – Paul Clarvis
- Violin – Emlyn Singleton
- Vocals – Moby
