= X-Men: Apocalypse (soundtrack) =

2016 film score by John Ottman

X-Men: Apocalypse (Original Motion Picture Soundtrack)

Film score by John Ottman
- Released: May 20, 2016
- Genre: Film score
- Length: 76:32
- Labels: Sony Classical; Fox Music
- Producer: John Ottman

John Ottman chronology
The Nice Guys (2016)	X-Men: Apocalypse (2016)	The Gifted (2017)

X-Men: Apocalypse (Original Motion Picture Soundtrack) is the soundtrack album to the 2016 film X-Men: Apocalypse, based on the X-Men characters appearing in Marvel Comics, and is the seventh mainline installment in the X-Men film series and the seventh installment overall. Directed and produced by Bryan Singer, the film score is composed by his regular collaborator, composer-editor John Ottman, being the first to score more than one film in the X-Men film series, having previously scored X2 (2003) and X-Men: Days of Future Past (2014).

The film score was released by and Sony Classical and Fox Music on digital download on May 20, 2016.

== Development ==
On March 2, 2015, it was announced that John Ottman, who composed the scores for X2 and X-Men: Days of Future Past, would return to write and compose the score for Apocalypse. On May 20, 2016, the official soundtrack was released as a digital download. In addition to Ottman's score, the film features a remix of the second movement of Ludwig van Beethoven's seventh symphony entitled "Beethoven Havok" and two songs contemporary to the film's 1983 setting, "Sweet Dreams (Are Made of This)" by Eurythmics and "The Four Horsemen" by Metallica.

== Track listing ==
X-Men: Apocalypse (Original Motion Picture Soundtrack)
No.	Title	Writer(s)	{{{extra_column}}}	Length
1.	"20th Century Fox Fanfare" (X-Men Version)	Bruce Broughton; David Newman (composer) (Note: 1994-1998 20th Century Studios fanfare composed by Broughton; 1997, 1998- 20th Century Studios fanfare composed and arranged by Newman.)	John Ottman	0:25
2.	"Apocalypse"			3:43
3.	"The Transference"			3:50
4.	"Pyramid Collapse / Main Titles"			2:25
5.	"Eric's New Life"			1:27
6.	"Just a Dream"			1:15
7.	"Moira's Discovery / Apocalypse Awakes"			2:25
8.	"Shattered Life"			2:54
9.	"Going Grey / Who the F are You?"			1:49
10.	"Eric's Rebirth"			2:48
11.	"Contacting Eric / The Answer!"			5:01
12.	"Beethoven Havok (Note: This track references Ludwig van Beethoven's seventh symphony.)"			2:53
13.	"You Can See"			1:31
14.	"New Pyramid"			2:13
15.	"Recruiting Psylocke"			2:04
16.	"Split them Up!"			4:15
17.	"A Piece of his Past"			1:42
18.	"The Magneto Effect"			4:26
19.	"Jet Memories"			1:25
20.	"The Message / Some Kind of Weapon"			4:01
21.	"Great Hero / You Betray Me"			5:13
22.	"Like a Fire"			4:24
23.	"What Beach?"			1:51
24.	"Rebuilding / Cuffed / Goodbye Old Friend"			3:35
25.	"You're X-Men / End Titles"			4:09
26.	"Rest Young Child (Vocal Version) [Feat. Jasper Randall]"			2:18
Total length:				76:32

== Accolades ==
Year	Award	Category	Recipient(s)	Result	Ref.
2016	Hollywood Music in Media Awards	Best Original Score – Sci-Fi/Fantasy Film	John Ottman	Nominated	
