= Home (Nick Jonas song) =

Promotional single by Nick Jonas

from the album Ferdinand
- Released: October 20, 2017
- Recorded: 2017
- Genre: Pop rock
- Length: 3:01
- Label: Island
- Songwriters: Nick Jonas; Justin Tranter; Nick Monson
- Producer: John Powell

"Home" is a song by American singer Nick Jonas. It was released on October 20, 2017, through Island Records as the first promotional single of the soundtrack for the film Ferdinand.

== Background ==
On September 19, 2017, it was announced that singer Nick Jonas wrote and recorded a song called "Home" for the movie. It was featured in the third trailer released the next day, and also appeared in the movie and end credits. Talking about the song, Jonas stated, "I wrote this song with good friends of mine...and we wrote about feeling accepted and feeling loved, wherever that place is for you. For me it's home, it's my family, people I have closest to me; and the experiences we've shared." On September 21, 2017, a brand new trailer of the movie Ferdinand was released with contains a part of the song.

== Critical reception ==
Laura Klonowski of Celebmix gave it a positive review, noting that "'Home' is a real feelgood, toe-tapping pop smash, and is the perfect song for an animation kids movie. The lyrics are fun and easy to learn which is great for the young audience, while the strong hooks, and catchy beat make it mature enough for older listeners to enjoy. And Nick Jonas' vocals sound incredible. It's a really great track that just makes you feel happy. The lyrics are full of meaning and sentiment, and overall it's just a really classic pop hit. Time and time again the former Jonas Brothers star proves himself to be one of our generations best vocalists and songwriters and with 'Home' he has once again showcased his immense talents to the world. He really is one of the best artists of our time." The song was nominated for a Golden Globe Award for Best Original Song and Best Song Written and/or Recorded Created for a Film at the Guild of Music Supervisors Awards.

== Music video ==
On December 13, 2017, the music video of the song premiered online. Nick Jonas sings the song from the center of the arena for most of the clip before being joined by a diverse cast of dancers. The video also features clips from the new film.

== Live performance ==
On December 13, 2017, Jonas performed the song live at Chase Pay Village inside New York City’s Oculus. He performed an acoustic version of the song alongside "Levels", "Close", "Find You" and "Jealous".

On December 14 he performed the song live on the Today Show.

== Track listing ==
- Digital download
1. "Home" – 3:01
- Digital download
1. "Home" (Film Version) – 2:48

== Charts ==
Chart (2017)	Peak position
Kid Digital Song Sales (Billboard)	4

== Release history ==
Region	Date	Format	Label	Ref.
Various	October 20, 2017	Digital download	Island	
