= Love Magic =

Studio album by L.T.D.
- Released: November 3, 1981
- Genre: Funk
- Length: 37:24
- Language: English
- Label: A&M
- Producer: L.T.D.; Michael Stokes

L.T.D. chronology
Shine On (1980)	Love Magic (1981)	For You (1983)

Love Magic is the eighth studio album by American funk group L.T.D., their last on long-time label A&M Records. It was released on November 3, 1981.

== Reception ==
Editors at AllMusic rated the album three out of five stars, with critic Alex Henderson writing that it is "surprisingly successful" after the loss of vocalist Jeffrey Osborne in 1980 and a few songs are "excellent", while most are "decent".

== Track listing ==
Side one
No.	Title	Writer(s)	Length
1.	"Kickin' Back"	James Davis and Carle Vickers	6:08
2.	"Burnin' Hot"	Andre Ray and Vickers	6:05
3.	"Cuttin' It Up"	Mitch McDowell	4:13
4.	"Stay on the One"	Lorenzo Carnegie, J. Davis, and John McGhee	4:17

Side two
No.	Title	Writer(s)	Length
5.	"Love Magic"	J. Davis and Leslie Wilson	4:04
6.	"April Love"	Alvino Bennett, Henry Davis, and Marilyn McLeod	4:25
7.	"It Must End"	H. Davis and Jacquelyn Hall	4:29
8.	"Now"	Patrick Henderson and Allee Willis	3:43

== Personnel ==
L.T.D.

- Alvino Bennett – drums, arrangement, production
- Arthur "Lorenzo" Carnegie – alto and tenor saxophone, arrangement, production
- Jimmie "J. D." Davis – keyboards, arrangement, production
- Henry E. Davis – bass guitar, arrangement, production
- John T. McGhee – guitar, arrangement, production
- Abraham J. "Onion" Miller, Jr. – saxophone, arrangement, production
- Andre Ray – lead vocals, arrangement, production
- Jake Riley – trombone, arrangement, production
- Carle W. Vickers – horns, arrangement, production
- Leslie Wilson – lead vocals, arrangement, production

Additional personnel

- Jack Andrews – engineering
- Chuck Beeson – art direction, design
- Jim Caselli – assistant engineering
- Paulinho Da Costa – percussion
- Bernie Grundman – mastering
- Don Hahn – engineering
- George Holz – photography
- Marie Marsh – backing vocals
- Al Ramirez – engineering
- Steve Sollars – assistant engineering
- Michael Stokes – production
- Bruce Swedien – mixing
- Vesta Williams – backing vocals

== Chart performance ==
Love Magic reached 83 on the Billboard 200 and topped out at 21 on that publication's R&B Albums chart.

== See also ==
- List of 1981 albums
