= Edward Irons =

American economist (1923–2022)

- Born: August 29, 1923; Hulbert, Oklahoma, U.S.
- Died: January 17, 2022 (aged 98)

Academic background
- Education: Wilberforce University, (BS); University of Minnesota, (MA); Harvard Business School, (DBA) (PhD)

Academic work
- Discipline: Banking
- Institutions: Clark Atlanta University; Howard University; Florida A&M University

Edward Daryl Irons (August 29, 1923 – January 17, 2022) was an American economist who was professor and dean emeritus at Clark Atlanta University. He was founding dean of Howard University's School of Business, and organizer and first president of Riverside National Bank, in Houston Texas, which was, in 1964, the first bank with a charter given to Black Americans in 40 years. He was also an early president of the National Economic Association.

== Early life and education ==
Irons was born in Hulbert, Oklahoma on August 29, 1923, the third of four children in a partially Cherokee family. After graduating from high school as valedictorian of the Attucks School, he served in the U.S. Navy. He graduated from Wilberforce University with a BS degree in business administration around 1948, worked for a year at Tulsa's Moton Memorial Hospital, and then attended the University of Minnesota, where he graduated in 1951 with an MA degree in hospital administration, winning an award for the best management thesis in his class.

He was hired by Oklahoma governor Johnston Murray to manage the Oklahoma state hospital system, resigning when he was unable to raise salaries. He then worked as a business manager for Florida A&M University. He left this position over his participation in the Tallahassee bus boycott in 1956, to pursue doctoral work in finance at Harvard.

In 1959, he was the second Black person to receive a doctoral degree from Harvard Business School, writing a thesis on "The Organization of a Bank; a Study of Selected New Banks."

== Career ==
Irons was the first president of Riverside National bank in Houston, Texas, now Unity National Bank, in 1964. It was the first in a wave of black commercial banks being opened around the US, and Irons served as a consultant to many of these other institutions. He was founding dean of Howard University's School of Business, and served for many years as Dean of Clark Atlanta University's School of Business.

== Personal life and death ==
Irons died on January 17, 2022, at the age of 98. He was survived by his wife, three children, including Edward D. Irons Jr., 9 grandchildren, and six great-grandchildren.

== Selected works ==
- Irons, Edward D. The Autobiography of Dr. Edward Irons: Only by Grace. Spirit Reign Communication.
- Yeats, Alexander J., Edward D. Irons, and Stephen A. Rhoades. "An analysis of new bank growth." The Journal of Business 48, no. 2 (1975): 199-203.
- Irons, Edward D. "Black Banking—Problems and Prospects." The Journal of Finance 26, no. 2 (1971): 407-425.
- Doctors, Samuel I., Allan R. Drebin, Edward D. Irons, and William C. Hunter. "A pilot study of the impact of minority banks on their communities." The Review of Black Political Economy 5, no. 4 (1975): 386-403.
- Irons, Edward D. "Black entrepreneurship: Its rationale, its problems, its prospects." Phylon 37, no. 1 (1976): 12-25.
