= X-Men: Days of Future Past (soundtrack) =

2014 film score by John Ottman

X-Men: Days of Future Past (Original Motion Picture Soundtrack)

Film score by John Ottman
- Released: May 26, 2014
- Genre: Film score
- Length: 1:16:52
- Labels: Sony Classical; Fox Music

John Ottman chronology
Non-Stop (2014)	X-Men: Days of Future Past (2014)	The Nice Guys (2016)

X-Men: Days of Future Past (Original Motion Picture Soundtrack) is the soundtrack album to the 2014 film X-Men: Days of Future Past, based on the X-Men characters appearing in Marvel Comics, and is the fifth mainline installment in the X-Men film series and the seventh installment overall. Directed and produced by Bryan Singer, the film score is composed by his regular collaborator, composer-editor John Ottman, being the first to score more than one film in the X-Men film series, having previously scored X2 (2003).

The film score was released by Sony Classical and Fox Music on digital download on May 26, 2014, on CD on June 30, 2014, and on vinyl on August 4, 2014. The music received mixed response from critics. An expanded version of the soundtrack, including music exclusive to The Rogue Cut, was released on July 10, 2015.

== Development ==
John Ottman, returned to score for X-Men: Days of Future Past when Singer took over the project. Ottman re-used some of his themes from X2, notably the main title theme, which is the first instance where a theme from previous X-Men film has been retained. He retained the same style of "lyrical and build upon character themes that would weave in and out of the film and done in a straight orchestral sense", previously approached in X2. However, following Singer's request he tried to compose "something more 'modern'" that could be compared to other contemporary superhero scores, and not to follow Henry Jackman's score for First Class. The 1970s setting inspired the inclusion of "synthesized elements with some analog synths, electric piano, bass and some guitar".

Ottman initially use to edit the film without score and use temp tracks for studio release, while beginning work on the actual score after that. On balancing both his duties as composer and editor, he said "As I'm cutting, and putting sequences together in my head, I'm subliminally hearing and thinking about the kind of music it's going to be, but what it's actually going to be, I'm not sure yet." For Days of Future Past, Ottman describing the balancing duties in an interview saying: "All I do is worry about it from the moment I go to wherever we're shooting, I'm worried about the score and when I'm going to write it, and how I'm going to do it. The editorial process never ends – especially on a complicated film. Then when the studio comes in with notes and the film starts going around in circles, and I have to go write the score somehow, yet I'm still tending to the recutting, various special-effects problems, looping the actors and test screenings. It never ends. There's never really I time where I can say, ‘okay everybody, I'm going to go write the score now.' I can't put the film on hold."

== Reception ==
Gregory Heaney of Allmusic wrote "the tense score sets the backdrop for the X-Men's race against time with its ominous tones and heart-pounding pacing. Most impressive is the way Ottman is able to blend the classical with the futuristic, elegantly allowing the score to travel through time as the film while still maintains a cohesive theme. Like the film itself, the score for X-Men: Days of Future Past is a thrilling work that should help to revitalize and reinvent the previously waning franchise." Mellisa Redman I'm her review for Renowned for Sound wrote "the musical score for the latest X-Men film is a great accompaniment to the movie, even though the transitions between melodies were a little disjointed in many of the tracks. But if you're a fan of epic movie music scores, then these compositions by John Ottman should definitely be on your list to check out next."

Filmtracks.com wrote "You have to wonder if Ottman and his crew mailed in this effort due to the composer's emphasis on editing the film. So much of it is underplayed or derivative that something definitely went wrong in the creative process. At least we finally have thematic continuity in the franchise." Gabe Toro of Cinemablend praised Ottman's re-use of the signature main theme from X2, with electric guitars writing, "The new steroidal sound is actually pretty awesome, and diehards who have listened to the sound of that second film constantly had to be geeked out hearing a new version score the opening to Singer's latest", but felt that "the rest of the composition fails to distinguish itself beyond that, relying on apocalyptic motifs like downbeat crescendos and eerie soundscapes. The way Ottman employs that original theme interwoven with the new score suggests the older film is almost under attack, an interesting idea carried out with only a small dose of originality. Or sometimes none at all."

Not all reviews were positive. Jonathan Broxton of Moive Music UK wrote "Days of Future Past is such a missed opportunity; instead of having the bold, powerful, emotionally substantial music it deserves, and which the visual cinematic canvas on display would seem to demand, we have a whole load of apocalyptic but ultimately directionless action sequences, a few anonymous string textures, a Hans Zimmer temp-track clone, and a main theme which sounds as good today as it did the day Henry Mancini first wrote it." James Southall of Movie Wave wrote "The best parts are clearly considerably better than anything in Ottman's X2 but they are interspersed with some incredibly blatant temp-track lifts and a whole host of music which is frankly just terribly dull (the album is considerably overlong); add to that the bizarrely piecemeal nature of even the better material, which really does have so little continuity it sounds like it could have been written by different composers for different films, and it's a curiosity indeed. Maybe the score was very rushed for some reason – if so, that's a shame, because with more time perhaps the ideas could have been turned into a more compelling whole. There's no denying that some of those ideas really are excellent but it would be a very generous stretch to say they can rescue Days of Future Past from being a disappointment."

== Track listing ==
X-Men: Days of Future Past (Original Motion Picture Soundtrack)
No.	Title	Writer(s)	{{{extra_column}}}	Length
1.	"20th Century Fox Fanfare" (X-Men Version)	Bruce Broughton; David Newman (composer) (Note: 1994-1998 20th Century Studios fanfare composed by Broughton; 1997, 1998- 20th Century Studios fanfare composed and arranged by Newman.)	John Ottman	0:24
2.	"The Future – Main Titles"			2:44
3.	"Time's Up"			4:18
4.	"Hope (Xavier's Theme)"			4:48
5.	"I Found Them"			2:52
6.	"Saigon/Logan Arrives"			4:36
7.	"Pentagon Plan/Sneaky Mystique"			3:25
8.	"He Lost Everything"			1:51
9.	"Springing Erik"			3:33
10.	"How Was She"			1:47
11.	"All Those Voices"			3:19
12.	"Paris Pandemonium"			7:45
13.	"Contacting Raven"			1:48
14.	"Rules of Time"			3:07
15.	"Hat Rescue"			1:30
16.	"Time's Up" (Film Version)			3:34
17.	"The Attack Begins"			5:04
18.	"Join Me"			3:20
19.	"Do What You Were Made For"			2:56
20.	"I Have Faith in You/Goodbyes"			2:27
21.	"Welcome Back/End Titles"			3:58
22.	"Time in a Bottle" (Performed by Jim Croce)			2:27
23.	"The First Time Ever I Saw Your Face" (Performed by Roberta Flack)			5:20
Total length:				76:52

== Extended soundtrack ==
X-Men: Days of Future Past: The Rogue Cut (Original Motion Picture Soundtrack – Extended Version)

Film score by John Ottman
- Released: July 10, 2015
- Genre: Film score
- Length: 1:52:00
- Label: Sony Classical

Disc 1
No.	Title	Length
1.	"Main Theme"	0:56
2.	"Hope (Xavier's Theme)"	4:50
3.	"The Future"	1:59
4.	"Time's Up"	4:19
5.	"I Found Them"	2:52
6.	"Xavier's Plan"	3:35
7.	"Rules of Time"	3:08
8.	"Trask Hearing – A New Era"	2:34
9.	"Saigon – Logan Arrives"	4:35
10.	"He Lost Everything"	1:50
11.	"Pentagon Plan – Sneaky Mystique"	3:25
12.	"Springing Erik"	3:33
13.	"Clothes Off – Goodbye Peter"	2:12
14.	"You Abandoned us All! – Yes, she Does"	2:23
15.	"How Was She?"	1:47
16.	"Paris Pandemonium"	7:44
17.	"Whitehouse Meeting"	2:41
18.	"Are you Mystique?"	2:01
19.	"We Need You"	2:14
20.	"All Those Voices"	3:18
21.	"Charles n Charles"	2:59
22.	"Off the Tracks"	1:23
23.	"There's Someone Else"	1:59
24.	"Contacting Raven"	1:48
25.	"Letting Raven In"	3:34
Total length:		1:13:54

Disc 2
No.	Title	Length
1.	"Finding Rogue"	3:02
2.	"Costly Escape"	2:21
3.	"Cutting Ties"	2:47
4.	"Ripples in Time"	1:19
5.	"Raising RFK – Here they Come"	2:36
6.	"Raising RFK – Magneto Descends"	1:23
7.	"The Attack Begins"	2:26
8.	"Saving the Future"	5:03
9.	"Join Me"	2:55
10.	"They Found Us – Remember the Xmen"	3:40
11.	"I Have Faith in You – Goodbyes"	3:19
12.	"You're Here!"	2:26
13.	"Welcome Back – End Titles"	3:56
14.	"En Sabah Nur"	0:54
Total length:		38:05

== Charts ==
Chart (2014)	Peak position
UK Soundtrack Albums (OCC)	34
US Billboard 200	176
US Soundtrack Albums (Billboard)	23

== Personnel ==
Credits adapted from CD liner notes

Instrumentation

- Bass – Ed Meares, Bruce Morgenthaler, Chris Kollgaard, David Parmeter, Drew Dembowski, Ian Walker, Oscar Hidalgo, Steve Dress
- Bassoon – Rose Corrigan, Judy Farmer, Ken Munday
- Cello – Andrew Shulman, Armen Ksajikian, Cecilia Tsan, Dennis Karmazyn, Kim Scholes, Giovanna Clayton, Tim Landauer, Tim Loo, Trevor Hand, Xiao-Dan Zheng, Steve Erdody
- Clarinet – Phil O'Connor, Ralph Williams, Don Foster
- Flute – Jenni Olson, Steve Kujala, Heather Clark
- French horn – Allen Fogle, Dan Kelley, Dylan Hart, Jenny Kim, Laura Brenes, Mark Adams, Phil Yao, Steve Becknell, Dave Everson
- Guitar – George Doering
- Harp – Katie Kirkpatrick
- Oboe – Lara Wickes, Leslie Reed
- Percussion – Dan Greco, Wade Culbreath, Bob Zimmitti
- Timpani – Peter Limonick
- Trombone – Alan Kaplan, Bill Reichenbach, Phil Teele, Steve Holtman, Alex Iles
- Trumpet – Dan Rosenboom, Jim Grinta, Jon Lewis, Rick Baptist
- Tuba – Jim Self, Doug Tornquist
- Viola – Alma Fernandez, Andrew Duckles, Carolyn Riley, Darrin McCann, Dave Walther, Erik Rynearson, Matt Funes, Rob Brophy, Shawn Mann, Thomas Diener, Vicki Miskolczy, Brian Dembow
- Violin – Alwyn Wright, Alyssa Park, Ana Landauer, Ben Powell, Carol Pool, Christian Hebel, Darius Campo, Eun Mee Ahn, Grace Oh, Javier Orman, Josefina Vergara, Julie Gigante, Katia Popov, Lily Ho Chen, Maia Jasper, Marc Sazer, Mark Robertson, Natalie Leggett, Neel Hammond, Nina Evtuhov, Paul Henning, Phil Levy, Richard Altenbach, Roberto Cani, Sara Parkins, Sarah Thornblade, Tamara Hatwan, Tereza Stanislav, Roger Wilkie

Orchestra

- Concertmaster – Bruce Dukov
- Orchestration – Jason Livesay, John Ashton Thomas, Nolan Livesay, Pete Anthony, Rick Giovinazzo
- Orchestra conductor – Jeffrey Schindler
- Orchestra contractor – Gina Zimmitti, Whitney Martin
- Stage engineer – Denis St. Amand
- Stage manager – Damon Tedesco, Tom Steel

Choir

- Choral arrangements – Lior Rosner, Nolan Livesay
- Choir conductor and contractor – Jasper Randall
- Alto – Adriana Manfred, Amy Fogerson, Bonnie Schindler, Kimberly Switzer, Leanna Brand, Michele Hemmings, Nike St Clair
- Bass – Dylan Gentile, Ed Levy, Gregg Geiger, James Hayden, Michael Geiger, Reid Bruton, Scott Graff
- Soprano – Carrah Flahive, Claire Fedoruk, Elissa Johnston, Karen Hogle Brown, Karen Whipple Schnurr, Lesley Leighton, Suzanne Waters
- Tenor – Andy Brown, Daniel Chaney, Fletcher Sheridan, Gerald White, Michael Lichtenauer, Shawn Kirchner, Steve Amerson

Management

- Business affairs – Tom Cavanaugh
- Music clearance – Ellen Ginsburg
- Licensing – Mark Cavell
- Executive in charge of music – Danielle Diego
- Music management – Johnny Choi
- Product manager – Klara Korytowska
- Booklet design and editing – WLP Ltd
- Music production supervisor – Rebecca Morellato

Technical

- Music producer – John Ottman
- Programming – Edwin Wendler, John Ottman, Roger Suen
- Recording – Damon Tedesco, Larry Mah, T. Casey Stone
- Mixing – T. Casey Stone
- Editing – Amanda Goodpaster, Stephanie Lowry
- Mastering – Fernando Lee, Stephen Marsh
- Copyist – Joann Kane Music Service, Mark Graham
