= Music Is My Sanctuary =

Studio album by Gary Bartz
- Released: 1977
- Recorded: 1977
- Genre: Jazz-funk
- Label: Capitol
- Producer: Larry Mizell & Fonce Mizell, Gary Bartz, James Carter

Gary Bartz chronology
Ju Ju Man (1976)	Music Is My Sanctuary (1977)	Love Affair (1978)

Professional ratings
Review scores
Source	Rating
AllMusic	4/5 stars
The Penguin Guide to Jazz Recordings	2/4 stars
The Rolling Stone Jazz Record Guide	3/5 stars

Music Is My Sanctuary is an album by American jazz musician Gary Bartz. It was released in 1977 on Capitol Records.

== Track listing ==
1. "Music Is My Sanctuary" (Gary Bartz, Sigidi) 6:20
2. "Carnaval De L'Esprit" (Gary Bartz) 5:55
3. "Love Ballad" (Skip Scarborough) 4:09
4. "Swing Thing" (Larry and Fonce Mizell) 6:50
5. "Ooo Baby Baby" (Smokey Robinson, Pete Moore) 5:52
6. "Macaroni" (Gary Bartz) 6:42

== Personnel ==
- Gary Bartz - Saxophone (Alto, Soprano), Piano, Electric Piano, Synthesizer, Vocals
- Larry Mizell - Keyboards, Vocals
- George Cables - Piano
- David T. Walker, John Rowin, Juewett Bostick, Wah-Wah Watson - Guitar
- Curtis Robinson, Jr., Welton Gite - Bass
- Howard King, James Gadson, Nate Neblett - Drums
- Bill Summers, James Mtume - Percussion
- Eddie Henderson, Ray Brown - Trumpet
- Sigidi, Syreeta Wright - Vocals

== Charts ==
Year	Album	Chart positions
Year	Album	Jazz Albums
1977	Music Is My Sanctuary	26

=== Singles ===
Year	Single	Chart positions
Year	Single	US R&B
1977	"Love Ballad"	15
