= Holding On (When Love Is Gone) =

Single by L.T.D.

from the album Togetherness
- B-side: "Together Forever"
- Released: 1978
- Recorded: 1978
- Genre: R&B
- Length: 3:56
- Label: A&M
- Songwriter(s): Jeffrey Osborne, John T. McGhee
- Producer(s): Bobby Martin

L.T.D. singles chronology
| "Never Get Enough of Your Love" (1978) | "Holding On (When Love Is Gone)" (1978) | "We Both Deserve Each Other's Love" (1978) |

"Holding On (When Love Is Gone)" is a song by R&B/funk band L.T.D. Released as a single from their album, Togetherness, the song spent two weeks on top of the Billboard R&B singles chart in September 1978 and peaked at number 49 on the Billboard Hot 100.
