= Togetherness (L.T.D. album) =

Studio album by L.T.D.
- Released: May 23, 1978
- Studio: Total Experience (Hollywood, California)
- Genre: Soul, funk
- Label: A&M
- Producer: Bobby Martin

L.T.D. chronology
Something to Love (1977)	Togetherness (1978)	Devotion (1979)

Singles from Togetherness
- 1. "Holding On (When Love Is Gone)" Released: June 28, 1978; 2. "We Both Deserve Each Other's Love" Released: November 9, 1978

Togetherness is the fifth studio album by Los Angeles, California -based band, L.T.D., released in 1978 on the A&M label.

== Commercial performance ==
The album peaked at No. 3 on the R&B albums chart. It also reached No. 18 on the Billboard 200. The album features the singles "Holding On (When Love Is Gone)", which peaked at No. 1 on the Hot Soul Singles chart and No. 49 on the Billboard Hot 100 chart, and "We Both Deserve Each Other's Love", which charted at No. 19 on the Hot Soul Singles chart.

== Critical reception ==
Professional ratings
Review scores
Source	Rating
AllMusic	4/5 stars
Christgau's Record Guide	B−

The Bay State Banner wrote that "the band pays tribute to all of its influences with a ten-song outing... For those of you who are more in tune to LTD's funk offerings, there are three tunes that'll have you freakin' in a second: the appropriately entitled 'Jam', 'It's Time to be Real' and 'Together, Forever'."

== Track listing ==
Side one
No.	Title	Writer(s)	Length
1.	"Holding On (When Love Is Gone)"	Jeffrey Osborne, John T. McGhee	3:57
2.	"We Both Deserve Each Other's Love"	Jeffrey Osborne, James Davis	3:05
3.	"Jam"	Jake Riley, John T. McGhee	4:38
4.	"You Must Have Known I Needed Love"	Len Ron Hanks, Zane Grey	3:33
5.	"Don't Stop Loving Me Now"	LeRoy Bell, Casey James	3:56

Side two
No.	Title	Writer(s)	Length
6.	"It's Time to Be Real"	Jeffrey Osborne, Henry Davis	3:28
7.	"Concentrate on You"	Harold Johnson	4:45
8.	"You Fooled Me"	Len Ron Hanks, Zane Grey	3:14
9.	"Together Forever"	William Osborne, Carle Vickers	3:45
10.	"Let's All Live and Give Together"	William Osborne, Jeffrey Osborne	4:15

== Personnel ==
L.T.D.

- Jeffrey Osborne – lead vocals, background vocals, percussion, drums (tracks 2–3, 6–7, 10), vocal arrangements (tracks 1, 2, 6, 10)
- Lorenzo Carnegie – alto and tenor saxophones, flute
- Henry E. Davis – bass guitar, clavinet (track 6), background vocals, rhythm and horn arrangements (track 6)
- James E. Davis – piano, acoustic and electric piano, clavinet, celeste, background vocals, arrangements (track 2)
- John T. McGhee – electric and acoustic guitars, rhythm arrangements (track 1)
- Abraham J. "Onion" Miller Jr. – tenor and baritone saxophones
- Billy Osborne – organ, piano, acoustic and electric piano, clavinet, percussion, drums (track 9), orchestra bells, background vocals, horn and vocal arrangements (track 9), rhythm arrangements (track 10)
- Jake Riley – trombone, rhythm arrangements (track 3), horn arrangements (track 10)
- Carle W. Vickers – trumpet, flugelhorn, soprano saxophone, bass and C flutes, rhythm and horn arrangements (track 9)

Additional musicians

- Benorce Blackmon – additional electric and acoustic guitars
- Melvin D. Webb – additional percussion, drums (tracks 1, 4–5, 8)
- Paul Shure – string concertmaster
- Len Ron Hanks – vocal arrangements (tracks 4, 8)
- Zane Grey – vocal arrangements (tracks 4, 8)

Technical personnel

- Bobby Martin – producer, arrangements (tracks 4, 5, 7, 8), horn arrangements (tracks 1, 3), string arrangements (tracks 1, 6, 10)
- Bob Hughes – engineer
- Douglas Graves – assistant engineer
- Bernie Grundman – mastering

== Charts ==
Album

Chart (1978)	Peaks
U.S. Billboard Top LPs	18
U.S. Billboard Top Soul LPs	3

Singles

Year	Single	Peaks	
Year	Single	US	US R&B
1978	"Holding On (When Love Is Gone)"	49	1
1978	"We Both Deserve Each Other's Love"	107	19
