= Something to Love =

Studio album by L.T.D.
- Released: July 11, 1977
- Studio: Total Experience (Hollywood, California)
- Genre: Soul, funk
- Length: 39:26
- Label: A&M
- Producer: Bobby Martin

L.T.D. chronology
| Love to the World (1976) | Something to Love (1977) | Togetherness (1978) |

Something to Love is the fourth studio album by Los Angeles, California -based band, L.T.D., released in 1977 on the A&M label.

== Critical reception ==
Professional ratings
Review scores
| Source | Rating |
|---|---|
| AllMusic | 4/5 stars |

The Bay State Banner wrote that "the bulk of this set is artificially sweet, overblown arrangement done by Manhattans producer Bobby Martin," and called the album "another weak-kneed pop-soul LP, good for unconfident black radio."

== Commercial performance ==
The album peaked at No. 1 on the R&B albums chart. It also reached No. 21 on the Billboard 200. The album features the singles "(Every Time I Turn Around) Back in Love Again", which peaked at No. 1 on the Billboard Hot Soul Singles chart and No. 4 on the Billboard Hot 100 chart, and "Never Get Enough of Your Love", which charted at No. 8 on the Hot Soul Singles chart and No. 56 on the Billboard Hot 100.

== Track listing ==
Side one
| No. | Title | Writer(s) | Length |
|---|---|---|---|
| 1. | "Age of the Showdown" | Rudy Clark | 5:41 |
| 2. | "(Won't Cha) Stay with Me" | Henry E. Davis | 3:59 |
| 3. | "(Every Time I Turn Around) Back in Love Again" | Len Ron Hanks, Zane Grey | 4:44 |
| 4. | "You Come First at Last" | Tom Shapiro, Jim O'Loughlin | 4:05 |

Side two
| No. | Title | Writer(s) | Length |
|---|---|---|---|
| 5. | "We Party Hearty" | Henry E. Davis, Jeffrey Osborne | 5:15 |
| 6. | "If You're in Need" | Len Ron Hanks, Zane Grey | 3:38 |
| 7. | "Never Get Enough of Your Love" | Ray Dahrouge | 3:47 |
| 8. | "Make Someone Smile, Today!" | Billy Osborne | 4:03 |
| 9. | "Material Things" | Jeffrey Osborne, Jimmie Davis | 4:14 |

== Personnel ==
L.T.D.

- Jeffrey Osborne - lead vocals (tracks 1–3, 5–7, 9), drums (tracks 4, 6), percussion, background vocals, arrangements (track 9)
- Billy Osborne – lead vocals (tracks 4, 8), organ, percussion, background vocals, arrangements (track 8)
- Jimmie Davis – acoustic and electric piano, clavinet, synthesizers, background vocals, arrangements (track 9)
- Henry E. Davis – bass guitar, background vocals, arrangements (tracks 2, 5)
- John T. McGee – guitar
- Carle Wayne Vickers – trumpet, flugelhorn, bass flute
- Abraham "Onion" Miller – tenor saxophone
- Lorenzo Carnegie – alto and tenor saxophones
- Jake Riley – trombone
- Melvin D. Webb – drums (tracks 1–3, 5, 7–9), percussion

Additional personnel

- Benorce Blackmon – additional guitar
- Bobby Martin – producer, arrangements (tracks 1, 3, 4, 6, 7), string arrangements (tracks 2, 8)
- Bob Hughes – engineer
- Douglas Graves – assistant engineer
- Bernie Grundman – mastering

== Charts ==
Album

| Chart (1977) | Peaks |
|---|---|
| U.S. Billboard Top LPs | 21 |
| U.S. Billboard Top Soul LPs | 1 |

Singles

| Year | Single | Peaks | |
| Year | Single | US | US R&B |
|---|---|---|---|
| 1977 | "(Every Time I Turn Around) Back in Love Again" | 4 | 1 |
| 1978 | "Never Get Enough of Your Love" | 56 | 8 |

== See also ==
- List of number-one R&B albums of 1977 (U.S.)
