= Love, Togetherness & Devotion =

Studio album by L.T.D.
- Released: January 23, 1974
- Recorded: 1973
- Studio: A&M Studios
- Genre: Soul, funk
- Label: A&M
- Producer: Calvin Carter

L.T.D. chronology
Love, Togetherness & Devotion (1974)	Gittin' Down (1974)

Professional ratings
Review scores
Source	Rating
Allmusic	2.5/5 stars

Love, Togetherness & Devotion is the debut album release for the Los Angeles, California-based band L.T.D.

== Track listing ==
No.	Title	Writer(s)	Length
1.	"To the Bone"	Jeffrey Osborne; Abraham "Onion" Miller, Jr.	3:22
2.	"Elegant Love"	Billy Osborne; J. Osborne	3:46
3.	"Not on Your Life"	Jimmie Davis; C. Whitworth; Miller	2:58
4.	"Gestures Unfulfilled"	Celeste Cole	3:59
5.	"What Goes Around"	B. Osborne	3:44
6.	"Success"	J. Davis; Robert "Pondaza" Santiel	4:15
7.	"Thank You Mother"	B. Osborne; J. Osborne	3:11
8.	"How Could You Be So Cold?"	J. Osborne; Lorenzo Carnegie	2:46
9.	"Whatcha Wanna Do"	Miller; Henry Davis	3:10
10.	"I Told You I'd Be Back"	J. Davis	3:20
11.	"Lucky Day"	Donna Prater; Carle Vickers	5:51

== Personnel ==
L.T.D.

- Carle Vickers – trumpet (1–6, 8–11), flugelhorn (2, 5, 7, 11), flute (4, 8), piccolo (1, 4), percussion (9), background vocals (4, 11)
- Jake Riley – trombone (1–6, 8–11), percussion (6)
- Lorenzo Carnegie – tenor saxophone (1, 6, 8–11), soprano saxophone (4), alto saxophone (2, 3, 5)
- Abraham "Onion" Miller – tenor saxophone (1–6, 8–11), percussion (3, 9), lead vocals (9)
- Toby Wynn – baritone saxophone (2, 3, 5, 6, 9–11), alto saxophone (1, 4, 8), percussion (9)
- Billy Osborne – organ and clavinet (1–6, 8–11), acoustic piano (5, 7), celeste (7), percussion (1, 2, 5, 10, 11), lead vocals (6), background vocals (1, 2, 4, 5, 7, 8, 11), arranger (7), vocal arranger (2, 5, 7)
- Jimmie Davis – electric piano, clavinet (7), acoustic piano (11), lead vocals (8), background vocals (1, 2, 4–7, 10, 11), arranger (1–6, 8–11), vocal arranger (6, 10)
- Henry Davis – bass guitar, flute (7)
- Jeffrey Osborne – drums, lead vocals (1–3, 5, 7, 11), background vocals (4, 6, 8, 10), percussion (2, 5, 7, 10), vocal arranger (1, 8, 9, 11)
- Robert "Pondanza" Santiel – congas, bongos, latin percussion
- Celeste Cole – lead vocals (2, 4), background vocals (1, 5–8, 10, 11), acoustic piano (4), percussion (5), vocal arranger (4)

Technical personnel

- Calvin Carter – producer
- Jerry Butler – executive producer
- Henry Lewy – engineer
- Milton Calice – assistant engineer

== Charts ==
Chart (1974)	Peak positions
Billboard Top R&B Albums	54
