= (Every Time I Turn Around) Back in Love Again =

Single by L.T.D.

from the album Something to Love
- B-side: "Material Things"
- Released: August 1977
- Recorded: 1977
- Genre: R&B, funk, disco
- Length: 8:37 (12" extended version); 4:44 (LP version); 3:40 (7" version)
- Label: A&M Records
- Songwriters: Len Ron Hanks, Zane Grey
- Producer: Bobby Martin

L.T.D. singles chronology
"Love to the World" (1977)	"(Every Time I Turn Around) Back in Love Again" (1977)	"Never Get Enough of Your Love" (1978)

"(Every Time I Turn Around) Back in Love Again" is a hit song written by Len Ron Hanks and Zane Grey for R&B/funk band L.T.D. Released from their Something to Love album, it spent two weeks at number one on the R&B singles chart in the fall of 1977. It became a gold record. Jeffrey Osborne is the lead singer.

"Back in Love Again" was their biggest pop hit, peaking at number 4 on the Billboard Hot 100 singles chart. The single also reached number 19 on the disco charts. The song was also a major hit on the Canadian pop charts, where it spent two weeks at number two.

== Personnel ==
- Jeffrey Osborne - Lead Vocals, Backing Vocals, Percussion
- Billy Osborne - Organ, Percussion, Backing Vocals
- Jimmie Davis - Clavinet, Electric Piano, Piano, Backing Vocals
- Henry Davis - Bass, Backing Vocals
- Bernorce Blackmon, John McGhee - Guitar
- Carle Vickers - Flute, Flugelhorn, Soprano Saxophone, Trumpet
- Abraham "Onion" Miller - Tenor Saxophone, Backing Vocals
- Lorenzo Carnegie - Alto Saxophone, Tenor Saxophone
- Jake Riley - Trombone
- Melvin Webb - Drums
- Lorraine Johnson - Backing Vocals

== Chart history ==
=== Weekly charts ===
Chart (1977–1978)	Peak position
Australia (Kent Music Report)	85
Belgium	18
Canada RPM Top Singles	2
Netherlands	15
New Zealand (Listener)	18
U.S. Billboard Hot 100	4
U.S. Billboard R&B	1
U.S. Billboard Disco/Dance	19
U.S. Cash Box Top 100	6

=== Year-end charts ===
Chart (1977)	Rank
Canada	172

Chart (1978)	Rank
Canada	70
Netherlands	68
U.S. Billboard Hot 100	57
U.S. Cash Box	69
