= Ferdinand (soundtrack) =

2017 soundtrack albums

Ferdinand (Music from the Motion Picture)

EP by Various Artists
- Released: December 1, 2017
- Genres: Pop; Latin pop
- Length: 18:55
- Label: Island
- Producer: John Powell

Singles from Ferdinand (Music from the Motion Picture)
- 1. "Home" Released: October 20, 2017; 2. "Watch Me" Released: December 1, 2017

Ferdinand (Music from the Motion Picture) is the soundtrack extended play that accompanied the 2017 film of the same name, released by Island Records on December 1, 2017. The album featured three original songs, with two of them being released as singles: "Home" and "Watch Me" performed by Nick Jonas. The score album, composed by John Powell, was released as Ferdinand (Original Motion Picture Score) by Fox Music on December 15, 2017.

== Ferdinand (Music from the Motion Picture) ==
=== Singles ===
On September 19, 2017, it was announced that singer Nick Jonas wrote and recorded a song called "Home" for the film. It was featured in the third trailer released the next day and also appears in the film and end credits. It was released as the first promotional single of the soundtrack on October 20, 2017. A second song by Jonas, "Watch Me", was used for the dance battle between the bulls and the horses; it was released alongside the film's EP on December 1.

=== Track listing ===
The soundtrack features three original tracks: "Home" and "Watch Me" by Nick Jonas, and "Lay Your Head On Me" by Juanes. Additionally, "I Know You Want Me (Calle Ocho)" by Pitbull, were featured in the film but not on the soundtrack.

No.	Title	Artist(s)	Length
1.	"Home"	Nick Jonas	3:00
2.	"Lay Your Head On Me"	Juanes	3:16
3.	"Watch Me"	Jonas	2:26
4.	"Freedom"	Pitbull	2:54
5.	"Macarena"	Los del Rio	4:09
6.	"Home (Film Version)"	Jonas	2:48
Total length:			18:55

=== Reception ===
Euan Franklin of The Upcoming wrote "John Powell's soundtrack is full of pleasant strumming from Spanish guitars, but is intruded upon by the poppy hindrance of Nick Jonas. His songs (specially written for Ferdinand) are tied to the animation's dance and action sequences, making the scenes more like music videos or even parodies. His involvement feels shoehorned into the movie and appears to be a greedy attempt at publicity, encouraging people to purchase the soundtrack." Michael Rechtshaffen of The Hollywood Reporter said, "a golden opportunity seems to have been missed with the soundtrack, where, of the three original songs, two are performed by Nick Jonas, reserving the third for Juanes. In a year when Luis Fonsi and Daddy Yankee's "Despacito" smashed chart records the world over, it might have been a better plan to hear how Ferdinand and company would do it down in Madrid or Toledo."

=== Accolades ===
Award	Date of ceremony	Category	Recipients	Result	Ref.
Golden Globe Awards	January 7, 2018	Best Original Song	"Home"	Nominated	
Guild of Music Supervisors Awards	February 8, 2018	Best Song/Recording Created for a Film	"Home"	Nominated	

== Ferdinand (Original Motion Picture Score) ==
Ferdinand (Original Motion Picture Score)

Film score by John Powell
- Released: December 15, 2017
- Recorded: 2017
- Studios: Newman Scoring Stage, 20th Century Fox Studios (Los Angeles, California); 5 Cat Studios (Los Angeles, California)
- Genre: Film score
- Length: 61:58
- Label: Fox Music
- Producers: John Powell; Batu Sener

John Powell chronology
Jason Bourne (2016)	Ferdinand (2017)	Solo: A Star Wars Story (2018)

John Powell, who scored for most of Blue Sky Studios' ventures, composed the score for Ferdinand. It was his last work for the company, after its closure on April 10, 2021. The score album was digitally released by Fox Music on December 15, 2017, and physically distributed by La-La-Land Records on December 22, 2017.

=== Track listing ===
No.	Title	Length
1.	"Bees And Bulls"	2:30
2.	"Selection Process"	2:00
3.	"Father And Son"	2:06
4.	"Finding Home"	5:32
5.	"A New Day"	2:52
6.	"Flower Festival"	4:46
7.	"There's Been A Mistake"	2:28
8.	"Lupe And Ferdinand"	2:28
9.	"Lipizzaners And Ferraris"	2:50
10.	"Ferdinand And Nina"	3:24
11.	"Bull Olympics"	3:42
12.	"Sunsets In The Training Yard"	3:14
13.	"Escape from ‘The Spa'"	3:32
14.	"Highway Chase"	3:16
15.	"From Train Station To Arena"	5:04
16.	"Madrid Finale"	12:14
Total length:		61:58

=== Reception ===
James Southall of Movie Wave wrote "Ferdinand is such a fun score" and adds "It's a little more laid-back than most of the composer's animated scores but still so energetic and full of life, the hour-long album passes by in no time–and the inherent flair which comes from the Spanish touches is just delightful." Filmtracks.com wrote "In the end, though, the competent ethnic applications and outstanding recording quality cannot really compensate for a rather underwhelming musical narrative sans strong themes. A charming score-only album passes without worry and doesn't have the obnoxious interludes of the Rio scores. Casual listeners should explore the track "From Train Station to Arena" before all others. The whole will undoubtedly entertain, but this is not Powell at his most memorable in the genre."

=== Credits ===
Credits adapted from CD liner notes.

- Composer – John Powell
- Producer – Batu Sener, John Powell, Dan Goldwasser, MV Gerhard
- Additional music and arrangements – Anthony Willis, Batu Sener, Paul Mounsey
- Engineer – John Traunwieser, John Crooks
- Recording – Shawn Murphy, Milton Gutierrez, Erik Swanson
- Mixing – Shawn Murphy, John Traunwieser
- Mastering – Patricia Sullivan
- Music editor – Tom Carlson
- Score editor – David Channing
- Production assistance – Frank K. DeWald, Neil S. Bulk, Soya Soo
- Copyist – Gregory Jamrok, JoAnn Kane Music Service, Mark Graham

Instruments

- Accordion – Nick Ariondo
- Bassoon – Anthony Parnther, Damian Montano, Ken Munday, Rose Corrigan, William May
- Cello – Alisha Bauer, Armen Ksajikian, Cecilia Tsan, Charlie Tyler, Dennis Karmazyn, Eric Byers, Giovanna Clayton, Jacob Braun, Joon Sung Jun, Julie Jung, László Mezö, Ross Gasworth, Steve Erdody, Tim Landauer, Tim Loo, Trevor Handy, Vanessa Freebairn Smith, Helen Altenbach
- Contrabass – Christian Kollgaard, Drew Dembowski, Ed Meares, Geoff Osika, Ian Walker, Mike Valerio, Oscar Hidalgo
- Clarinet – Dan Higgins, Ralph Williams, Stuart Clark
- Drums – Satnam Ramgotra
- Electric bass – Brandon Gilliard
- Flute – Ben Smolen, Heather Clark, Jenni Olson, Steve Kujala
- French horn – Allen Fogle, Amy Jo Rhine, Andrew Bain, Dan Kelley, Dave Everson, Dylan Hart, Greg Roosa, Jenny Kim, John Mason, Katelyn Faraudo, Laura Brenes, Mark Adams, Mike McCoy, Sarah Bach, Steve Becknell
- Guitar – Adam Del Monte, George Doering, Michael "Nomad" Ripoll*, Ramon Stagnaro
- Harp – Katie Kirkpatrick, Marcia Dickstein
- Oboe – Jessica Pearlman, Lara Wickes, Leslie Reed, Rong Huey Liu
- Percussion – Brian Kilgore, Alan Estes, Bob Zimmitti, Brian Kilgore, Dan Greco, Ted Atkatz, Ken McGrath, Pete Korpela, Wade Culbreath
- Piano, celesta – Randy Kerber
- Timpani – Don Williams, Greg Goodall
- Trombone – Alan Kaplan, Alex Iles, Bill Reichenbach, Steve Holtman
- Trumpet – Dan Fornero, Dan Rosenboom, Harry Kim, Jon Lewis, Rob Schaer
- Tuba – Doug Tornquist, Gary Hickman
- Viola – Aaron Oltman, Alma Fernandez, Andrew Duckles, Brian Dembow, Caroline Buckman, Darrin McCann, David Walther, Diana Wade, Erik Rynearson, Jonathan Moerschel, Luke Maurer, Matt Funes, Meredith Crawford, Robert Brophy, Shawn Mann
- Violin – Aimee Kreston, Alyssa Park, Amy Hershberger, Andrew Bulbrook, Belinda Broughton, Ben Jacobson, Bruce Dukov, Carol Pool, Charlie Bisharat, Christian Hebel, Daphne Chen, Darius Campo, Grace Oh, Ina Veli, Jackie Brand, Jessica Guideri, Josefina Vergara, Julie Gigante, Julie Rogers, Katia Popov, Kevin Kumar, Lisa Liu, Luanne Homzy, Lucia Micarelli, Maia Jasper, Marisa Sorajja, Marisa Kuney, Natalie Leggett, Neel Hammond, Nina Evtuhov, Paul Cartwright, Paul Henning, Phil Levy, Radu Pieptea, Rafael Rishik, Rebecca Chung Hamilton, Roberto Cani, Roger Wilkie, Sandy Cameron, Sara Parkins, Sarah Thornblade, Serena McKinney, Shalini Vijayan, Songa Lee, Tammy Hatwan, Tereza Stanislav

Orchestra

- Orchestration – Andrew Kinney, Jon Kull, Pete Anthony, Randy Kerber, Rick Giovinazzo
- Supervising orchestrator – John Ashton Thomas
- Conductor – John Powell
- Contractor – Gina Zimmitti, Whitney Martin
- Recording – Tim Lauber
- Stage engineer – Denis St. Amand
- Stage manager – Damon Tedesco, Peter Nelson

Management

- Business affairs – Tom Cavanaugh
- Executive in charge of music – Danielle Diego
- Music clearance – Ellen Ginsburg
- Soundtrack co-ordination – JoAnn Orgel
- Executive producer – Matt Verboys
- Music production supervisor – Rebecca Morellato
- Music supervisor – Johnny Choi, Patrick Houlihan
