= Dusic =

Single by Brick

from the album Brick
- B-side: "Happy" (7" single); "Fun" (12" single)
- Released: 1977
- Recorded: 1976
- Genre: Funk
- Length: 5:44 (album version); 3:43 (radio edit)
- Label: Bang
- Songwriter(s): Jimmy Brown, Ray Ransom, Regi Hargis
- Producer(s): Brick, Phil Benton

Brick singles chronology
"Dazz" (1976)	"Dusic" (1977)	"That's What It's All About" (1977)

"Dusic" is a song by Brick, issued as the lead single from the band's eponymous second album. The song was the band's final hit single on the Billboard Hot 100, peaking at No. 18 in 1977.

MC Hammer sampled the song for his hit "It's All Good" from The Funky Headhunter.

== Chart positions ==
Chart (1977)	Peak position
US Billboard Hot 100	18
US R&B Singles (Billboard)	2
Canada RPM Top 100	18
