= Leroy (musician) =

Leroy Miller
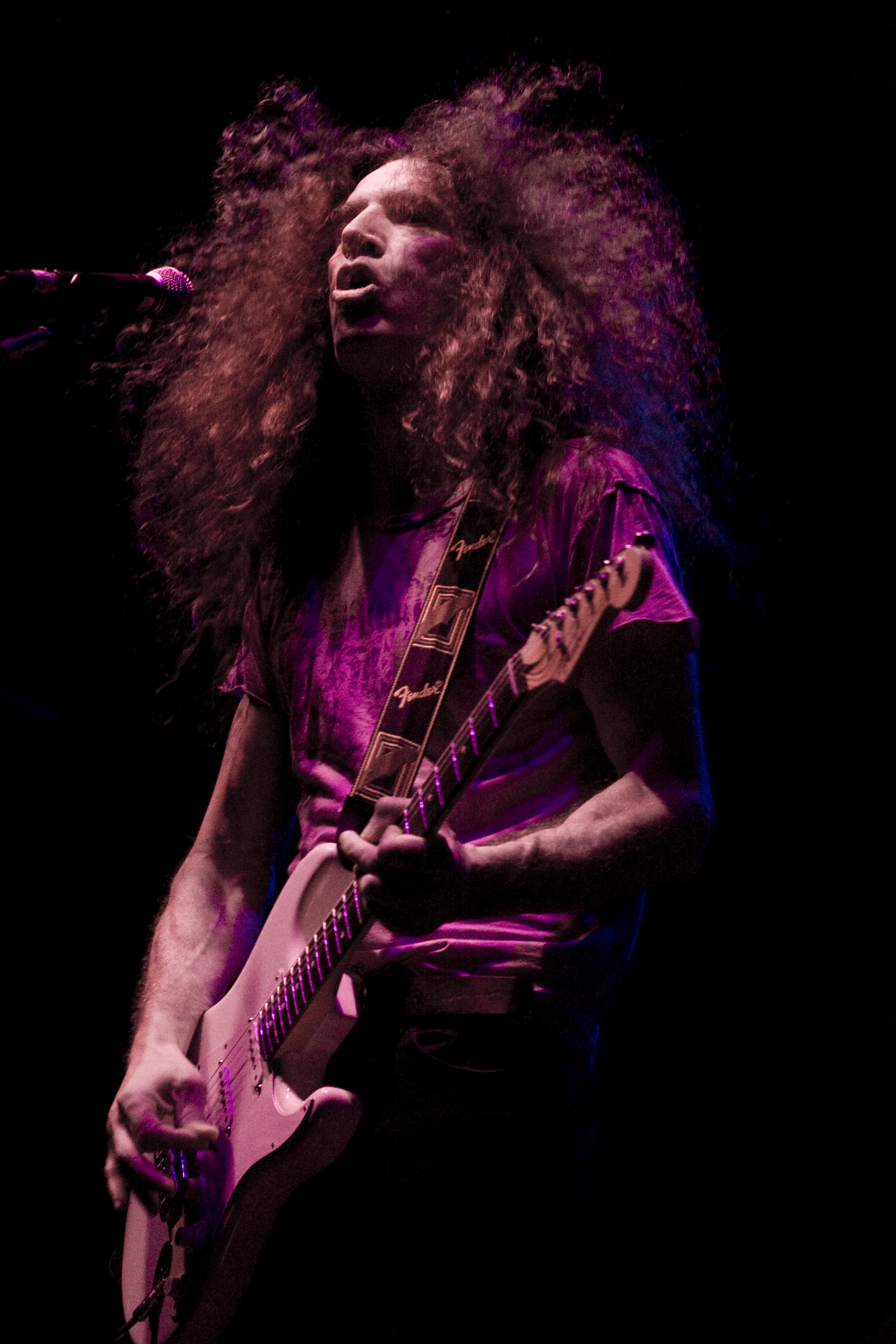
- Leroy Miller, former Smash Mouth guitarist, performing in the Centrum Arena at Southern Utah University.

Background information
- Born: February 19, 1965 (age 61)
- Origin: Walla Walla, Washington, U.S.
- Genres: Rock; funk; blues; folk; country
- Occupations: Musician; songwriter; record producer
- Instruments: Guitar; vocals; programming
- Years active: 1998–present
- Labels: Geffen, Hollywood, TML
- Formerly of: Smash Mouth
- Website: leroymillermusic.com

Kirk Leroy Miller professionally known as Leroy Miller (born February 19, 1965) is an American musician from Spokane, Washington.

== Career ==
Leroy has had two songs that have been featured on the TV series Scrubs, and one on the series Arrested Development. His song "New World" was featured on the 10 Things I Hate About You soundtrack. His song "Good Time" was featured in the films Driven and Laurel Canyon. In the summer of 2008, he joined Smash Mouth as a guitarist to replace Greg Camp, who had just left the band.

In 2003, he appeared on John Mayer's album Heavier Things, performing additional programming on the track "Split Screen Sadness".

== Albums ==
- Leroy (2001)
- Squish (2005)
- Walla Walla (2007)
- Don't Make Me Beg (2010)
- Temple (2013)
- Off the Rails (2015)
- Let It Ride (2019)
