= Good High =

Studio album by Brick
- Released: August 1976
- Recorded: 1975–76
- Studio: Trolley Tracks, Web IV, and The Sound Pit (Atlanta)
- Genre: Soul, funk, disco
- Label: Bang
- Producer: Brick, Jim Healy, Robert E. Lee, Johnny Duncan

Brick chronology
| Good High (1976) | Brick (1977) |

Professional ratings
Review scores
| Source | Rating |
|---|---|
| AllMusic | 4/5 stars |

Good High is the debut album by the Atlanta, Georgia-based band Brick. Released in 1976, it topped the Billboard R&B albums chart. The single, "Dazz", was a number-one song on the R&B singles chart and also reached number three on the Hot 100 chart.

== Track listing ==
1. "Here We Come" - (Jimmy "Lord" Brown) 2:52
2. "Music Matic" - (Ray Ransom) 3:00
3. "Dazz" - (Ransom, Eddie Irons, Regi Hargis) 5:37
4. "Can't Wait" - (Ransom, Irons, Hargis) 3:21
5. "Southern Sunset" - (Ransom) 4:03
6. "Good High" - (Ransom, Irons, Hargis) 3:11
7. "Brick City" - (Donald Nevins) 6:19
8. "Sister Twister" - (Nevins, Brown, Ransom, Irons, Hargis) 3:33
9. "That's What It's All About" - (Brown) 4:16

== Personnel ==
- Jimmy "Lord" Brown – saxophone, flute, trombone, trumpet, vocals
- Donald Nevins – keyboards, vocals
- Ray Ransom – bass, vocals
- Eddie Irons – drums, vocals
- Regi Hargis – guitar, vocals
- Atlanta Symphony Players (Benjamin Picone, David Arenz, Frank Walton, Heidi Nitchie, Larry LeMaster, Patricio Salvatierra, Willard Shull) – strings

== Charts ==
| Chart (1977) | Peak position |
|---|---|
| Billboard Pop Albums | 19 |
| Billboard Top Soul Albums | 1 |

=== Singles ===
| Year | Single | Chart positions | | |
| Year | Single | US Pop | US Soul | US Disco |
|---|---|---|---|---|
| 1976 | "Dazz" | 3 (1977) | 1 | 7 (1977) |
| 1976 | "Music Matic" | - | 82 | - |

== See also ==
- List of number-one R&B albums of 1977 (U.S.)
