= Jessica Riddle =

American singer-songwriter (born 1980)

- Born: April 15, 1980 (age 46); Los Angeles, California, US
- Genres: Pop
- Years active: 1999–present

Jessica Riddle (born April 15, 1980, in Los Angeles, California) is an American singer-songwriter. Riddle attained minor fame with the hit "Even Angels Fall" on her debut album Key of a Minor, which was featured in the 1999 movie 10 Things I Hate about You and on its soundtrack. "Even Angels Fall" charted on the Billboard Adult Top 40 chart, topping out at No. 27 on April 8, 2000. It was on the chart for 12 weeks.

Riddle is also a part-time model and actress, who has appeared wearing swimsuits in magazines such as Stuff and Maxim.

Although dropped from Hollywood Records, she is still recording, using her married name, Jessica Jacobs. In 2003, she released her second album, called Chapter 2.

Riddle has had two dance tracks released, one entitled "I Know You're Gone" with DJ Max Graham and "Tell Me" also with Graham as a writer, released by Tiësto under his "Clear View" moniker.
