= Brick (Brick album) =

Studio album by Brick
- Released: September 1977
- Recorded: 1977
- Studio: Web IV, Atlanta, Georgia
- Genre: Soul, funk
- Label: Bang
- Producer: Brick, Phil Benton

Brick chronology
Good High (1976)	Brick (1977)	Stoneheart (1979)

Singles from Brick
- 1. "Dusic" Released: August 1977

Brick is the second album by the Atlanta, Georgia-based band Brick, released in 1977.

== Critical reception ==
Professional ratings
Review scores
Source	Rating
AllMusic	4/5 stars

The Bay State Banner wrote: "Half of Brick's LP is no-nonsense party music, very simply played and economically produced. The rest is less interesting somewhat dullish ballads and slow-movers featuring the usual electric piano played for effect rather than excitement."

== Samples ==
"Fun" has been sampled by India Arie on her song "Video" from her 2001 album Acoustic Soul, Da Brat on the song "Live it Up" from her 1996 album Anuthatantrum, and Akinyele on his song "Put It in Your Mouth" from the EP of the same name, and his 1996 album Aktapuss. "Living from the Mind" has been sampled by En Vogue on the song "No No No (Can't Come Back)" from their 2000 album Masterpiece Theatre. "Ain't Gonna' Hurt Nobody" was sampled by Kid 'n Play in the song of the same name which was featured on their 1991 album Face the Nation, in their hit 1991 film House Party 2, and on its accompanying soundtrack.

== Track listing ==
1. Ain't Gonna' Hurt Nobody - (Ray Ransom) 3:54
2. Living from the Mind - (Ray Ransom) 3:36
3. Happy - (Jimmy "Lord" Brown, Ray Ransom, Eddie Irons) 4:23
4. We Don't Wanna' Sit Down (We Wanna' Git Down) - (Donald Nevins, Jimmy "Lord" Brown, Ray Ransom, Eddie Irons, Regi Hargis) 5:41
5. Dusic - (Jimmy "Lord" Brown, Ray Ransom, Regi Hargis) 5:44
6. Hello - (Eddie Irons, Ray Ransom, Jimmy "Lord" Brown) 3:35
7. Honey Chile - (Donald Nevins, Jimmy "Lord" Brown, Ray Ransom, Eddie Irons) 4:53
8. Fun - (Regi Hargis) 3:33
9. Good Morning Sunshine - (Jimmy "Lord" Brown) 3:36

== Personnel ==
- Jimmy "Lord" Brown – Saxophone, Flute, Trombone, Trumpet, Vocals
- Donald Nevins – Keyboards, Vocals
- Ray Ransom – Bass, Vocals
- Eddie Irons – Drums, Vocals
- Regi Hargis – Guitar, Vocals

== Charts ==
Chart (1977)	Peak position
Billboard Pop Albums	15
Billboard Top Soul Albums	1

=== Singles ===
Year	Single	Chart positions	
Year	Single	US Pop	US Soul
1977	"Dusic"	18	2
1977	"Ain't Gonna' Hurt Nobody"	92	7

== See also ==
- List of number-one R&B albums of 1977 (U.S.)
