= L.T.D. (band) =

American R&B/funk band

- Also known as: Love, Togetherness & Devotion
- Origin: Greensboro, North Carolina, U.S.
- Genres: R&B, funk
- Years active: 1968–present
- Labels: A&M, Mirage
- Members: Arthur "Lorenzo" Carnegie; Johnny McGhee; Aya Iwata; Tefere Hazy; Tresure Mark Vincent Brown; Steve Toussaint; Herbert Lee Woods
- Past members: Carle Wayne Vickers (deceased); Abraham "Onion" Miller (deceased); Henry E. Davis (deceased); Jimmie "J.D." Davis (deceased); Billy Osborne; Jeffrey Osborne; Jake Riley (deceased); Melvin Webb (deceased); Alvino Bennett; Leslie Wilson (deceased); Andre Ray; Celeste Cole; Toby Wynn; Robert Santiel; Tyrone Griffin; Richard Moorings; Kermit Singleton; Howard Johnson; Conway Johnson PMC
- Website: Official website

L.T.D. is an American R&B/funk band best known for their 1977 hit single, "(Every Time I Turn Around) Back in Love Again" and their 1978 single "Holding On (When Love Is Gone)", as well as their many ballads, such as 1976's "Love Ballad", 1978's "Concentrate on You" and "We Both Deserve Each Other's Love", and 1980's "Where Did We Go Wrong?".

== Career ==
L.T.D. (standing for Love, Togetherness, and Devotion), was formed in Greensboro, North Carolina, as Love Men Limited, in 1968. They initially consisted of members Arthur "Lorenzo" Carnegie (alto, tenor saxes, flute, guitar), Jake Riley (trombone), Carle Wayne Vickers (trumpet, flute, soprano sax), and Abraham "Onion" Miller (tenor sax, vocals) who had been working as members of the 15-piece "Fantastic Soul Men Orchestra" backing the popular duo Sam & Dave, along with Jimmy "J.D." Davis (keyboards, vocals). They then relocated to New York City, where Toby Wynn (baritone sax) joined them. While performing on a gig in Providence, Rhode Island, Jeffrey Osborne (drums, lead vocals) was recruited by them.

After two years in New York, they relocated to Los Angeles, California, where Jeffrey's brother, Billy Osborne (organ, drums, keyboards, co-lead vocals), Celeste Cole (vocals), Henry E. Davis (bass, vocals) and Robert Santiel (congas, percussion) joined them. 1974 found them signing with A&M Records as L.T.D. (Love Togetherness & Devotion). In 1976, Johnny McGhee (guitar) joined the band. By this time Jeffrey Osborne became the group's primary lead vocalist, with Melvin Webb taking over on drums in 1977. Webb was replaced by Alvino Bennett in late 1978.

The group then went on to release songs such as "Love Ballad" (1976), "(Every Time I Turn Around) Back in Love Again" (1977), "Holding On (When Love Is Gone)", and many others. Soon after the band's 1980 album Shine On, Jeffrey and Billy Osborne departed to start solo careers. Andre Ray and Leslie Wilson (formerly of New Birth) were then chosen as lead vocalists for their next album Love Magic (1981) which produced two more hits, "April Love" and "Kicking Back". Leslie Wilson left to continue his solo career and L.T.D. stayed busy in the music industry by recording for small independent record labels, and doing their own personal music projects.

In 1999, a new lineup of L.T.D. featuring three original members—Carnegie, Vickers, and McGhee—along with new members Tre'sure (lead vocals, keys), Aya Iwata, (keys, vocals), Herbert Lee Woods (keys, vocals), Steve Toussaint (bass, vocals), and Tefere Hazy (drums, vocals) was formed and have been touring since the 2000s.

Melvin Webb died in 1982, Jake Riley died in 2000, and J.D. Davis died in 2008. Henry E. Davis died in 2012 in Los Angeles, CA. Carl Wayne Vickers died in 2024. Leslie Wilson died on October 27, 2025.

== Discography ==
=== Studio albums ===
Year	Album	Peak chart positions			Certifications	Record label
Year	Album	US	US R&B	CAN	Certifications	Record label
1974	Love, Togetherness & Devotion	—	54	—		A&M
1974	Gittin' Down	—	40	—		A&M
1976	Love to the World	52	7	70		A&M
1977	Something to Love	21	1	24	RIAA: Gold	A&M
1978	Togetherness	18	3	21	RIAA: Platinum	A&M
1979	Devotion	29	5	73	RIAA: Gold	A&M
1980	Shine On	28	6	—		A&M
1981	Love Magic	83	21	—		A&M
1983	For You	—	66	—		Montage
"—" denotes a recording that did not chart or was not released in that territory.

=== Compilation albums ===
- Classics, Vol. 27 (1987, A&M)
- Greatest Hits (1996, A&M)
- The Millennium Collection: The Best of L.T.D. (2000, A&M)

=== Singles ===
Year	Single	Peak chart positions						Album
Year	Single	US	US R&B	US Dan	AUS	CAN	UK	Album
1974	"Elegant Love"	—	—	—	—	—	—	Love, Togetherness & Devotion
1975	"Don't Lose Your Cool"	—	—	—	—	—	—	Gittin' Down
1975	"Tryin' to Find a Way"	—	—	—	—	—	—	Gittin' Down
1975	"Rated X"	—	—	—	—	—	—	Non-album single
1976	"Love Ballad"	20	1	—	—	38	—	Love to the World
1977	"Love to the World"	91	27	—	—	—	—	Love to the World
1977	"(Every Time I Turn Around) Back in Love Again"	4	1	19	85	2	—	Something to Love
1978	"Never Get Enough of Your Love"	56	8	—	—	78	—	Something to Love
1978	"Holding On (When Love Is Gone)"	49	1	—	—	59	70	Togetherness
1978	"We Both Deserve Each Other's Love"	—	19	—	—	—	—	Togetherness
1979	"Dance 'N' Sing 'N'"	—	15	—	—	—	—	Devotion
1979	"Share My Love"	—	69	—	—	—	—	Devotion
1979	"Stranger"	—	14	—	—	—	—	Devotion
1980	"Where Did We Go Wrong"	—	7	—	—	—	—	Shine On
1980	"Shine On"	40	19	—	—	—	—	Shine On
1981	"Kickin' Back"	102	10	36	—	—	—	Love Magic
1982	"April Love"	—	28	—	—	—	—	Love Magic
1983	"For You"	—	50	—	—	—	—	For You
"—" denotes a recording that did not chart or was not released in that territory.
