= Edward D. Irons Jr. =

American record producer and songwriter (born 1954)

- Born: January 24, 1954 (age 72)
- Occupation: Musician
- Known for: Founding member of Brick
- Spouse: Anne G.
- Children: Tylen Irons Garcia; Tori Irons; Troi Irons; Trenton Irons
- Parent(s): Dr. Edward D. Irons; Lorean Irons

Edward D. Irons Jr. (born January 24, 1954) is an American record producer, musician and songwriter. He is most well known for being a member of S.O.S. Band and Brick and is an influential member of the early Atlanta music scene. He has written and produced albums for numerous rap and R&B acts including Snoop Dogg, 2 Nazty, Prince, Morris Day and the Time, and Anne G. His hit song "Dazz" mated disco and jazz for a #1 R&B/Top 10 crossover.

== Career ==
Irons was a founding member of Brick, a jazz funk band, which still performs around the world. They coined their own term for disco-jazz, "dazz". They released their first single "Music Matic" on Main Street Records in 1976, before signing to the independently distributed Bang Records. Their next single, "Dazz", (#3 Pop, #1 R&B) was released in 1976. The band continued to record for Bang Records until 1982. Other hits followed: "That's What It's All About" (R&B #48) and "Dusic" (#18 Pop, #2 R&B) in 1977, and "Ain't Gonna Hurt Nobody" (#92 Pop, #7 R&B) in 1978. Their last Top Ten R&B hit was "Sweat (Til You Get Wet)" in 1981.

== Personal life ==
Eddie was born in Florida to financier, Dr. Edward D. Irons and a school teacher, Lorean Ryan. In 1990, he divorced his first wife, Teri and married Anne G., a songwriter and R&B singer. They had four children: Tylen Irons Garcia, Tori Irons, Troi Irons, and Trenton Irons.
