= Dazz =

Single by Brick

from the album Good High
- B-side: "Southern Sunset" (7"); "Music Matic" (12")
- Released: July 6, 1976
- Genre: Disco; jazz
- Length: 3:23 (radio edit); 5:35 (full version)
- Label: Bang
- Songwriter(s): Regi Hargis, Eddie Irons, Ray Ransom
- Producer(s): Jim Healy, Johnny Duncan, Robert E. Lee, Brick

Brick singles chronology
"Music Matic" (1976)	"Dazz" (1976)	"Dusic" (1977)

"Dazz" is a song by R&B/funk band Brick. "Dazz" is a combination of disco, funk and jazz, hence the title "Dazz", a combination denominator for "Disco Jazz". Released in 1976 from their debut album Good High, it would become their biggest hit, spending four weeks at the top of the R&B singles chart, while reaching number three on the Billboard Hot 100 and number 41 on Billboard's year-end chart. In Canada, it reached number 26.

Another popular 1970s-era soul group, the Dazz Band, took their name from the song. The song was featured in a house party scene in the 2016 action-comedy film The Nice Guys, set in 1977. It was also featured in a scene in the 2019 Elton John biopic, Rocketman.

== Sampling ==
"Dazz" has been sampled by multiple artists (partial list):

- "No Vaseline" by Ice Cube from his 1991 album Death Certificate, arguably the most well-known instance of the song's sampling, and considered by some to be the greatest diss track of all time.
- "Cinderfella Dana Dane" by Dana Dane from his 1987 album Dana Dane with Fame.
- "Jazzie's Groove" by Soul II Soul from their 1989 album Club Classics Vol. One.
- "Do You Wanna Get Funky" by C+C Music Factory from their 1994 album Anything Goes!
- "Search 4 the Lyte" by MC Lyte from her 1991 album Act Like You Know.
- "Lavish" by 415 from their 1990 album 41Fivin.
