= Brick (band) =

American band

- Origin: Atlanta, Georgia, U.S.
- Genres: Funk, R&B, disco
- Years active: 1972–present
- Labels: Bang, Magic City

Brick is an American band that created a successful merger of funk and jazz in the 1970s. Their most popular single was "Dazz" (#3 U.S. Pop, #1 U.S. R&B, #36 UK), which was released in 1976.

== History ==
Brick was formed in Atlanta in 1972 by Regi Hargis from members of two bands - one disco and the other jazz. They coined their own term for disco-jazz, "dazz". They released their first single "Music Matic" on Main Street Records in 1976, before signing to the independently distributed Bang Records. Their next single, "Dazz", (#3 Pop, #1 R&B) was released in 1976. The band continued to record for Bang records until 1982. Other hits followed: "That's What It's All About" (R&B #48) and "Dusic" (#18 Pop, #2 R&B) in 1977, and "Ain't Gonna Hurt Nobody" (#92 Pop, #7 R&B) in 1978. Their last Top Ten R&B hit was "Sweat (Til You Get Wet)" in 1981.

Donald Nevins died on August 7, 2011, at the age of 62. Founder and guitarist Regi Hargis died on October 15, 2021, at the age of 70. Ambric Bridgeforth died on November 25, 2023 at age 69.

== Members ==
=== Current ===
- Jimmy Brown (lead vocals, saxophone, flute, trombone)
- Billy Barlow (keyboards)
- Tres Gilbert (bass guitar)
- Melvin Baldwin (drums and percussion)
- Tomi Martin (lead guitar)
- Sherita Murphy (lead and background vocals)

=== Former ===
- Regi Hargis (guitar/bass guitar/vocals); died 2021
- Ray Ransom (lead vocals/bass/keyboards/percussion)
- Donald Nevins (vocals/acoustic piano/clavinet/Moog); died 2011
- Edward D. Irons Jr. (lead vocals/drums/keyboards)
- Ambric Bridgeforth (vocals/keyboards); died 2023

== Discography ==
=== Studio albums ===
Year	Album	Peak chart positions	
Year	Album	US	US R&B
1976	Good High	19	1
1977	Brick	15	1
1979	Stoneheart	100	25
1980	Waiting on You	179	31
1981	Summer Heat	89	13
1982	After 5	—	66
1988	Too Tuff	—	—
"—" denotes releases that did not chart.

=== Compilation albums ===
- The Best of Brick (1995)
- Super Hits (2000)

=== Singles ===
Year	Single	Peak chart positions				
Year	Single	US Pop	US R&B	US Dance	CAN	UK
1976	"Music Matic"	―	82	―	―	―
1976	"Dazz"	3	1	7	26	36
1977	"Dusic"	18	2	―	18	―
1977	"That's What It's All About"	―	48	―	―	―
1978	"Ain't Gonna Hurt Nobody"	92	7	―	―	―
1979	"Dancin' Man"	―	47	―	―	―
1979	"Raise Your Hands"	―	34	―	―	―
1980	"All the Way"	106	38	―	―	―
1980	"Push Push"	―	21	―	―	―
1981	"Sweat (Til You Get Wet)"	―	10	64	―	―
1981	"Wide Open"	―	58	―	―	―
1982	"Free Dancer"	―	62	―	―	―
1982	"Stick by You"	―	―	―	―	―
"—" denotes releases that did not chart or were not released in that territory.
