= MC Hammer discography =

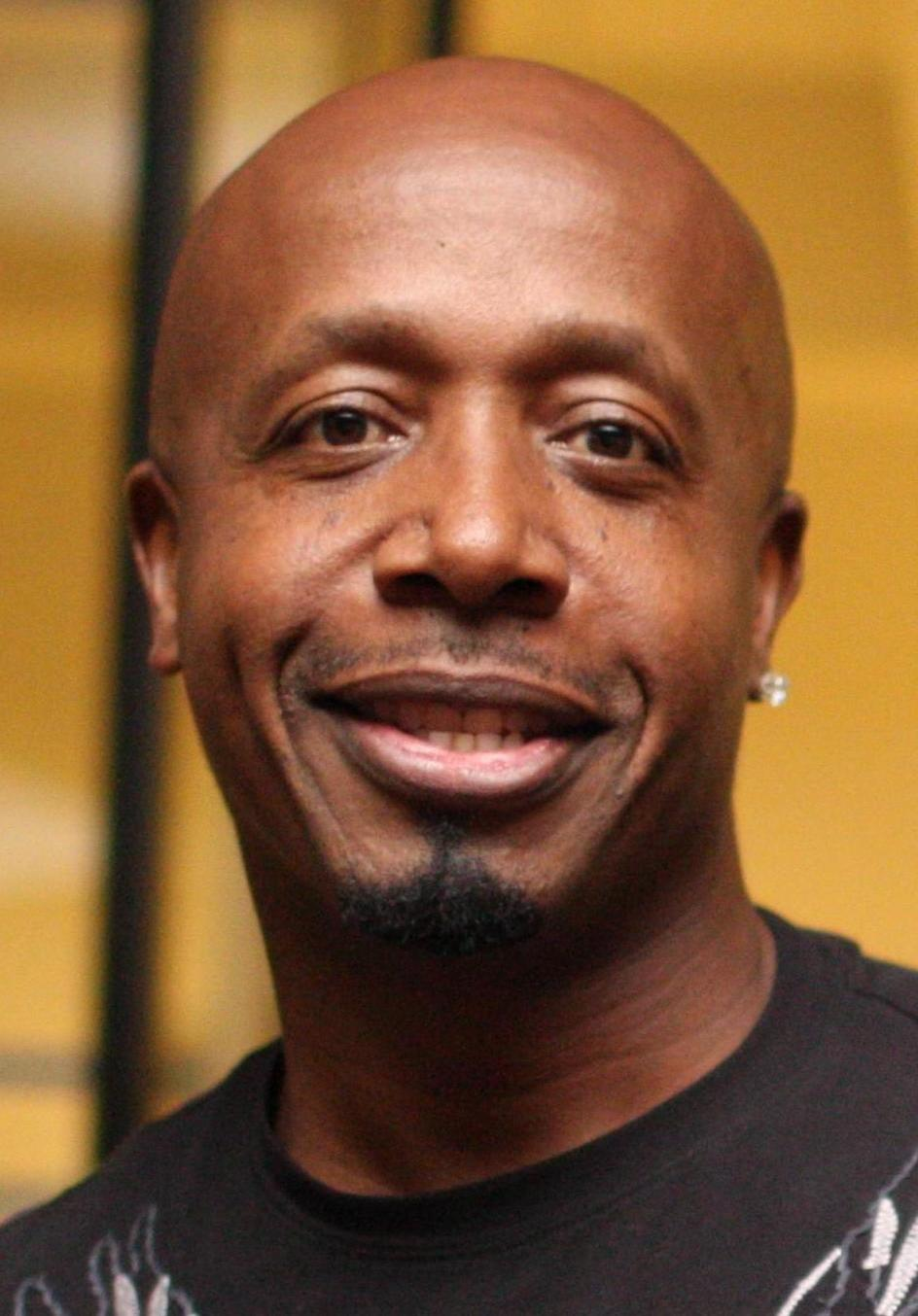
- Studio albums: 11
- Compilation albums: 5
- Singles: 48

The discography of American rapper MC Hammer includes the hit records "U Can't Touch This", "Pray", "2 Legit 2 Quit" and "Pumps and a Bump". Hammer is known for his flashy dance movements, choreography and Hammer pants. His status and entertaining showmanship made him a household name and hip hop icon. Hammer has sold more than 50 million records worldwide, breaking down numerous doors for rap music and demonstrating that hip-hop had the potential for blockbuster success. A multi-award winner, M.C. Hammer is considered a "forefather/pioneer" and innovator of pop rap (incorporating elements of freestyle music), and is the first hip hop artist to achieve diamond status for an album.

Throughout his career, Hammer has managed his own recording business and created independent record labels such as Bust It Records, Oaktown Records, Full Blast Digital Music Group and World Hit Records. He has introduced, signed and produced new talent (his own acts collaborating with him and producing music of their own during his career) including: Oaktown's 3.5.7, Common Unity, DRS, the vocal quintet Special Generation, Analise, James Greer, One Cause One Effect, DASIT (as seen on Ego Trip's The (White) Rapper Show), Teabag, Dom Kimberley, Geeman, Pleasure Ellis, B Angie B, The Stooge Playaz, Ho Frat Hoo! and Wee Wee, among others. A part of additional record labels, he has associated/collaborated/recorded with: VMF, Tupac Shakur, Teddy Riley, Felton Pilate, Tha Dogg Pound, Whole 9, Deion Sanders, Big Daddy Kane, BeBe & CeCe Winans and Jon Gibson (or J.G.), among others.

Before Hammer's successful career (and his "rags-to-riches-to-rags-and-back saga"), Burrell formed a Christian rap group known as the Holy Ghost Boy(s) with Gibson, producing songs such as "Word", "B-Boy Chill" and "Stupid Def Yal" (1987). Additionally, "The Wall" featured Hammer (it was originally within this song that he first identified himself as K.B. and then M.C. Hammer before its release), which was later released on Gibson's album Change of Heart (1988). This was CCM's first rap hit by a blue-eyed soul singer and/or duo. "Son of the King" showed up on Hammer's debut album Feel My Power (1986), as well as the re-released version Let's Get It Started (1988). Burrell and Tramaine Hawkins previously performed with Gibson's band in several concerts at various venues, such as the Beverly Theatre in Beverly Hills.

At about the age of 12, Oakland native Keyshia Cole recorded with Hammer and sought career advice from him. In 1992, Doug E. Fresh was signed to Hammer's Bust It Records label. Hammer signed with Suge Knight's Death Row Records in 1995.

In late 2012, Hammer appeared with Psy at the 40th American Music Awards and during Dick Clark's New Year's Rockin' Eve performing a mashup of "Gangnam Style" and "2 Legit 2 Quit" together, which was released on iTunes. Hammer released "Raider Nation (Oakland Raiders Anthem)" along with a video in late 2013 and "All in My Mind" (which samples "Summer Breeze" by The Isley Brothers) in early 2014, with his newly formed group Oakland Fight Club (featuring Mistah F.A.B.).

== Albums ==
=== Studio albums ===
List of studio albums, with selected chart positions and certifications
Title	Album details	Peak chart positions										Certifications
Title	Album details	US	US R&B	AUS	AUT	CAN	GER	NLD	NZ	SWI	UK	Certifications
Feel My Power	Released: August 13, 1986; Label: Bustin' Track	—	—	—	—	—	—	—	—	—	—	
Let's Get It Started	Released: September 28, 1988; Label: EMI, Capitol	30	1	188	39	—	42	—	39	19	46	RIAA: 2× Platinum
Please Hammer Don't Hurt 'Em	Released: February 12, 1990; Label: EMI, Capitol	1	1	5	15	1	14	15	2	11	8	RIAA: 10× Platinum (Diamond); ARIA: Platinum; BPI: 2× Platinum; BVMI: Gold; IFPI SWI: Gold; MC: 8× Platinum; RIANZ: Platinum
Too Legit to Quit	Released: October 29, 1991; Label: EMI, Capitol	2	3	84	—	15	49	—	14	—	41	RIAA: 3× Platinum; BPI: Silver; MC: 2× Platinum
The Funky Headhunter	Released: March 1, 1994; Label: Giant, Warner Bros.	12	2	192	—	—	—	—	—	—	—	RIAA: Platinum
Inside Out	Released: September 12, 1995; Label: Giant	119	23	—	—	—	—	—	—	—	—	
Family Affair	Released: June 23, 1998; Label: Oaktown, Nujam	—	—	—	—	—	—	—	—	—	—	

Note: While with Death Row Records, an unreleased album called Too Tight was produced in 1996. A digital release was produced between 2008 and 2009 called DanceJamtheMusic.

=== Independent albums ===
List of independent albums
Title	Album details
Active Duty	Released: November 20, 2001; Label: World Hit
Full Blast	Released: January 31, 2004; Label: Full Blast Music Group
Look Look Look	Released: July 4, 2006; Label: Full Blast Music Group
DanceJamtheMusic	Released: January 1, 2009; Label: Full Blast Music Group

=== Compilation albums ===
Title	Year
Greatest Hits	1996
Back 2 Back Hits	1998
The Hits	2000
Platinum MC Hammer	2008
Icon	2014

Note: Back 2 Back Hits was originally released in 1998 for CEMA and was re-released in 2006 for Capitol Records.

== Singles ==
Year	Title	Peak chart positions										Certifications	Album
Year	Title	US	US R&B	US Dan	AUS	CAN	NLD	NZ	SWE	SWI	UK	Certifications	Album
1987	"Ring 'Em"	—	—	—	—	—	—	—	—	—	—		Feel My Power
1988	"Let's Get It Started"	—	—	—	—	—	—	—	—	—	—		Feel My Power
1988	"Pump It Up"	—	46	40	—	—	—	—	—	—	—		Let's Get It Started
1989	"Turn This Mutha Out"	—	12	34	—	—	—	31	—	—	—		Let's Get It Started
1989	"They Put Me in the Mix"	—	40	40	—	—	—	—	—	—	—		Let's Get It Started
1989	"You've Got Me Dancing" (with Glen Goldsmith)	—	—	—	—	—	—	—	—	—	—		From the Glen Goldsmith album Don't Turn This Groove Around
1990	"U Can't Touch This"	8	1	6	1	8	1	1	1	2	3	RIAA: 4× Platinum; ARIA: 2× Platinum; BPI: Platinum	Please Hammer Don't Hurt 'Em
1990	"Have You Seen Her"	4	4	—	42	—	2	4	18	12	8	RIAA: Gold	Please Hammer Don't Hurt 'Em
1990	"Pray"	2	4	3	7	14	3	2	18	10	8	RIAA: Gold; ARIA: Gold	Please Hammer Don't Hurt 'Em
1990	"Here Comes the Hammer"	54	15	29	37	—	19	6	—	—	15		Please Hammer Don't Hurt 'Em
1990	"Help the Children"	—	12	—	—	—	—	—	—	—	—		Please Hammer Don't Hurt 'Em
1991	"Yo!! Sweetness"	—	—	—	149	—	—	—	—	—	16		Please Hammer Don't Hurt 'Em
1991	"(Hammer Hammer) They Put Me in the Mix"	—	40	—	149	—	—	—	—	—	20		non-album single (remix)
1991	"2 Legit 2 Quit"	5	3	18	43	37	39	4	—	—	60	RIAA: Platinum	Too Legit to Quit
1991	"Addams Groove"	7	15	10	12	67	16	9	31	21	4	RIAA: Gold	Too Legit to Quit
1992	"Do Not Pass Me By" (with Tramaine Hawkins)	62	15	—	—	—	28	42	—	—	14		Too Legit to Quit
1992	"This Is the Way We Roll"	86	20	—	—	—	—	—	—	—	—		Too Legit to Quit
1994	"Pumps and a Bump"	26	21	34	—	—	—	41	—	—	—		The Funky Headhunter
1994	"It's All Good"	46	14	—	136	—	—	17	—	—	52		The Funky Headhunter
1994	"Don't Stop"	115	63	41	—	—	—	—	—	—	72		The Funky Headhunter
1995	"Straight to My Feet" (with Deion Sanders)	—	—	—	175	—	—	—	—	—	57		Street Fighter (soundtrack)
1995	"Sultry Funk"	102	59	—	—	—	—	—	—	—	—		Inside Out
1995	"Keep On"	—	—	—	—	—	—	—	—	—	—		Inside Out
1995	"Going Up Yonder"	101	38	—	—	—	—	—	—	—	—		Inside Out
1996	"Too Late Playa" (with Tupac Shakur, Big Daddy Kane, Nuttso & Danny Boy)	—	—	—	—	—	—	—	—	—	—		Too Tight
1997	"He Brought Me Out"	—	—	—	—	—	—	—	—	—	—		Family Affair
1998	"Unconditional Love"	—	73	—	—	—	—	—	—	—	—		Family Affair
2001	"No Stoppin' Us (USA)"	—	—	—	—	—	—	—	—	—	—		Active Duty
2001	"Pop Yo Collar"	—	—	—	—	—	—	—	—	—	—		Active Duty
2004	"Full Blast"	—	—	—	—	—	—	—	—	—	—		Full Blast
2006	"Look 3x"	—	—	—	—	—	—	—	—	—	—		Look Look Look
2006	"Hyphy, Dumb, Buck, Krump"	—	—	—	—	—	—	—	—	—	—		Look Look Look
2006	"YAY"	—	—	—	—	—	—	—	—	—	—		Look Look Look
2006	"I Got It from the Town"	—	—	—	—	—	—	—	—	—	—		Look Look Look
2006	"What Happened to Our Hood?"	—	—	—	—	—	—	—	—	—	—		Look Look Look
2007	"Bring Our Brothers Home"	—	—	—	—	—	—	—	—	—	—		non-album single
2008	"Getting Back to Hetton"	—	—	—	—	—	—	—	—	—	—		DanceJamtheMusic
2008	"I Got Gigs"	—	—	—	—	—	—	—	—	—	—		DanceJamtheMusic
2008	"I Go"	—	—	—	—	—	—	—	—	—	—		DanceJamtheMusic
2008	"Keep It in Vegas"	—	—	—	—	—	—	—	—	—	—		DanceJamtheMusic
2008	"Lookin' Out the Window"	—	—	—	—	—	—	—	—	—	—		DanceJamtheMusic
2008	"Dem Jeans"	—	—	—	—	—	—	—	—	—	—		DanceJamtheMusic
2008	"Stooge Karma Sutra"	—	—	—	—	—	—	—	—	—	—		DanceJamtheMusic
2008	"Tried to Luv U"	—	—	—	—	—	—	—	—	—	—		DanceJamtheMusic
2010	"Better Run Run"	—	—	—	—	—	—	—	—	—	—		non-album singles
2011	"See Her Face"	—	—	—	—	—	—	—	—	—	—		non-album singles
2020	"Look Around"	—	—	—	—	—	—	—	—	—	—		non-album singles
2024	"U R Everything"	—	—	—	—	—	—	—	—	—	—		non-album singles
"—" denotes releases that did not chart

Note: Music videos were produced for "Let's Get It Started", "Pump It Up (Here's the News)", "Turn This Mutha Out", "(Hammer, Hammer) They Put Me in the Mix", "You've Got Me Dancing" (with Glen Goldsmith), "U Can't Touch This", "Have You Seen Her", "Pray" (including remixes), "Help the Children", "Too Legit to Quit", "Addams Groove", "Do Not Pass Me By" (with Tramaine Hawkins), "This Is the Way We Roll", "Pumps and a Bump", "It's All Good", "Too Late Playa", "Sultry Funk", "Keep On", "Going Up Yonder", "No Stoppin' Us (USA)", "Pop Yo Collar" and "Full Blast", among others.

== Additional releases and credits ==
Songs with or without music videos released (charting and non-charting) were:

- "Word", "B-Boy Chill" (live audio performance on YouTube), "Son of the King" (1986), "Stupid Def Yal" (1987) and CCM's hit song "The Wall" (1988) with Jon Gibson as the Holy Ghost Boy(s).
- Hammer was featured on "Wanna Be the Man" (with music video) and "For the Love of You" (peaked at No. 19 on the Billboard Hot R&B Singles chart and No. 12 on the Cashbox Top R&B Singles chart) from Earth, Wind & Fire's 1990 Heritage album.
- Hammer released the tracks "This is What We Do" (with music video) on the Teenage Mutant Ninja Turtles movie soundtrack (1990), and "That's What I Said" on the Rocky V soundtrack (1990).
- After Hammer signed One Cause One Effect, "Up with Hope, Down with Dope" (included music video) reached No. 77 on the Hot R&B Singles chart (5 weeks) and "Midnite Lover" (featuring B Angie B) peaked at No. 58 on the Hot R&B Singles chart (11 weeks) from their album Drop the Axxe (1990), which peaked at No. 51 on the Top R&B/Hip-Hop Albums chart.
- "We're All in the Same Gang" (1990) by West Coast Rap All-Stars featuring Hammer (with music video) charted and was nominated at the 33rd Annual Grammy Awards for Best Rap Performance by a Duo or Group in 1991.
- "The Blood" from the BeBe & CeCe Winans album Different Lifestyles (1991) featuring Hammer peaked at No. 8 on the Christian charts in 1992, without music video.
- "This Is the Way We Roll (High Street Mix)" and "Rollin' on Oaktown Style" were B-side tracks in 1992, with music video.
- "Unconditional Love" from Family Affair (1998) without music video.
- "I Got It from the Town" with music video, and "What Happened to Our Hood?" (featuring Sam Logan and originally from Active Duty) without music video.
- "Hyphy, Dumb, Buck, Krump" and "YAY" (produced by Lil Jon) from Look Look Look (released digitally and via web in 2006), with music videos originally via Myspace.
- "Bring Our Brothers Home" (non-album single released in June 2007) with music video.
- "I Got Gigs", "I Go" (produced by Lil Jon), "Keep It in Vegas", "Lookin' Out the Window", "Dem Jeans" (by DASIT), "Stooge Karma Sutra" (by The Stooge Playaz) and "Tried to Luv U" (by DASIT featuring Pleasure Ellis) from DanceJamtheMusic (released digitally and via web download between 2008 and 2009), with some music videos.
- "Better Run Run" (non-album single released online October 31, 2010) with music video.
- "See Her Face" (non-album track Hammer premiered to the public on The Oprah Winfrey Show via Flipboard on February 3, 2011) without music video.
- In late 2012, Hammer appeared with PSY at the 40th American Music Awards and during Dick Clark's New Year's Rockin' Eve performing a mashup of "Gangnam Style" and "2 Legit 2 Quit" together, which was released on iTunes.
- Among other songs, Hammer released "Raider Nation (Oakland Raiders Anthem)" along with a music video in late 2013 and "All in My Mind" (which samples "Summer Breeze" by The Isley Brothers) in early 2014, with his newly formed group Oakland Fight Club (featuring Mistah F.A.B.).
- Hammer released a visualizer music video for his song "We Gotta Do Better" featuring Gentry Kozia on April 22, 2015. It was posted on his personal blogspot via Vimeo.
- Hammer released additional hip-hop, R&B and soul tracks via his Full Blast Music label including: "Better Man" (December 2013) by Gentry Kozia of the Oakland Fight Club, "Say It Isn't So" (December 2016) featuring Gentry Kozia, "Perfect Night" (March 2017) featuring Gentry Kozia, "Don't Stop" (September 2017) featuring Pleasure Ellis (remix from The Funky Headhunter), "Here We Go Again" (November 2017) featuring Gentry Kozia, "22 Pills" (December 2017) credited as BIG HAMM featuring Gentry Kozia, "Kalifornia Git Down" (December 2017) from the mixtape The Chronicles of Big Hamm (via BMI Publishing), "Best Life" (May 2018) featuring Gentry Kozia, and "Lit Up" (October 2018) featuring Booby Hammer and Ace Kayo.
- Hammer released an updated version of his 1990 charting song "Help the Children" with a short film video in late 2017.
- Hammer released "U R Everything" with a music video in December 2024. The song samples "You Are Everything by The Stylistics.

Some singles have also appeared on other compilation albums, such as "Pump It Up (Here's the News)" and "U Can't Touch This". With exception to later remixes of early releases, Hammer produced and recorded many rap songs that were originally not made public, yet are now available on the Internet.

== Roll Wit It Entertainment ==
A sports fan, Hammer launched a new enterprise called Roll Wit It Entertainment & Sports Management, between albums Too Legit to Quit (1991) and The Funky Headhunter (1994). Clients included Evander Holyfield, Deion Sanders and Reggie Brooks.

In 1993, Hammer's production company released Gangsta Lean by DRS. The hit single from this album, "Gangsta Lean", spent six weeks at No. 1 on the US Billboard Hot R&B/Hip-Hop Songs chart and peaked at No. 4 on the US Billboard Hot 100. The single sold over 2.5 million copies.

== Accolades ==
M.C. Hammer's chronological summary of accolades/awards and recognitions/nominations are as follows:

- September 1989: The video for "Turn This Mutha Out" was nominated for a MTV Video Music Award for Best Rap Video.
- January 1990: Won two American Music Awards for Favorite Rap/Hip-Hop Artist and Favorite Rap/Hip-Hop Album (Let's Get It Started) and was nominated for Favorite Soul/R&B Album (Let's Get It Started).
- April 1990: Hit the Top 40 with "U Can't Touch This" from the LP Please Hammer Don't Hurt 'Em.
- May 1990: Hit the Top 10 with "U Can't Touch This".
- July 1990: Hit the Top 40 with "Have You Seen Her".
- August 1990: Hit the Top 10 with "Have You Seen Her".
- September 1990: The video for "U Can't Touch This" won a MTV Video Music Award for Best Rap Video and Best Dance Video and was nominated for Best Male Video, Best Editing, and Best Choreography.
- October 1990: Hit the Top 40 and Top 10 with "Pray".
- November 1990: Hit No. 1 for a week with "Pray".
- Hammer was a 1990 Top Singles Artist of the Year, a 1990 Billboard Hot Single Artist of the Year and was the 1990 Billboard Music Award Artist of the Decade. Another milestone was accomplished for Hammer when his album Please Hammer Don't Hurt 'Em spent 21 weeks at No. 1, according to Billboard 200, eventually resulting in diamond certification.
- January 1991: Hit the Top 40 with "Here Comes The Hammer". Won five American Music Awards for Favorite Soul/R&B Male Artist, Favorite Rap/Hip-Hop Artist, Favorite Soul/R&B Single ("U Can't Touch This"), Favorite Soul/R&B Album and Favorite Rap/Hip-Hop Album (Please Hammer, Don't Hurt 'Em), and was nominated for Favorite Pop/Rock Male Artist and Favorite Pop/Rock Album (Please Hammer Don't Hurt 'Em).
- February 1991: Won three Grammy Awards including Best Rap Solo Performance and Best R&B Song ("U Can't Touch This") and Best Music Video: Long Form (Please Hammer Don't Hurt 'Em: The Movie), and was nominated for Album of the Year (Please Hammer Don't Hurt 'Em) and Record of the Year ("U Can't Touch This").
- September 1991: The video for "Pray" was nominated for a MTV Video Music Award for Best Choreography and "Here Comes The Hammer" was nominated for Best Special Effects.
- November 1991: Hit the Top 40 with "2 Legit 2 Quit".
- December 1991: Hit the Top 10 with "2 Legit 2 Quit". Hit the Top 40 with "Addams Groove".
- According to ARC Weekly, Hammer ranked the No. 43 Singles Artist of 1991. He also received a Golden Raspberry Award for Worst Original Song ("Addams Groove") in 1991.
- January 1992: Won an American Music Award for Favorite Rap/Hip-Hop Artist. Hit the Top 10 with "Addams Groove."
- February 1992: Nominated for another Grammy Award for Best Rap Solo Performance ("Here Comes The Hammer").
- September 1992: Nominated for two MTV Video Music Awards including Best Video from a Film ("Addams Groove") and Best Choreography ("2 Legit 2 Quit").
- Hammer was a 1992 Billboard Hot Single Artist of the Year, and ranked the No. 34 Singles Artist of 1992 according to ARC Weekly.
- January 1993: Nominated for two Grammy Awards for Best Rap Solo Performance ("Addams Groove") and Best Music Video: Long Form (Hammerin' Home).
- In 1994, Hammer ranked the No. 84 Singles Artist of the Year according to ARC Weekly.
- March 1994: Hit the Top 40 with "It's All Good".
- April 1994: Hit the Top 40 with "Pumps and a Bump".
- September 1994: Nominated for a MTV Video Music Award for Best Choreography ("Pumps and a Bump").
- In 1999, MTV's 100 Greatest Videos Ever Made included Hammer's "U Can't Touch This" at No. 71.
- In October 2000, VH1's 100 Greatest Dance Songs included Hammer's "U Can't Touch This" at No. 88.
- In May 2001, VH1's 100 Greatest Videos included Hammer's "U Can't Touch This" at No. 59.
- In April 2003, VH1's 50 Greatest Hip Hop Artists included MC Hammer at No. 44.
- In 2004, Hammer was ranked No. 167 on the Top Pop Artists of the Past 25 Years chart.
- In August 2005, the single "U Can't Touch This" was certified gold.
- In April 2007, BET ranked Hammer as the No. 7 "Best Dancer Of All Time".
- In December 2007, VH1's 100 Greatest Songs of the 90s included "U Can't Touch This" at No. 16.
- In August 2008, at the World Hip Hop Dance Championship, Hammer won a Living Legends of Hip Hop Award from Hip Hop International in Las Vegas.
- In October 2008, Vibes The Best Rapper Ever Tournament declared Hammer the 17th favorite of all-time during the first round.
- During 2008, "U Can't Touch This" ranked as No. 26 on VH1's 100 Greatest Songs of Hip Hop.
- In September 2009, Hammer made the "accomplishment appearance" in Zombie Apocalypse for the downloadable Smash TV/Left 4 Dead hybrid for the Xbox 360.
- With over 2.6 million Twitter followers in 2010, his contribution to social media and as a co-founder of his own Internet businesses (such as DanceJam.com), Hammer was announced as the recipient of the first Gravity Summit Social Media Marketer of the Year Award. The award was presented to him at the 3rd Annual Gravity Summit on February 22, 2011, at the UCLA Covel Commons.
- In December 2011, MuchMoreMusic's Top 100 Big Tunes of the 90s included "U Can't Touch This" at No. 83.
- Hammer received the George and Ira Gershwin Award for Lifetime Musical Achievement (not to be mistaken for the Gershwin Prize), presented during the UCLA Spring Sing in Pauley Pavilion on May 17, 2013.

== Tours and concerts ==
Notable tours and concerts include: A Spring Affair Tour (1989), Summer Jam '89 (1989), Please Hammer Don't Hurt 'Em World Tour (1990 & 1991), Lawlor Events Center at University of Nevada, Reno (1990–2017), Too Legit to Quit World Tour (1992), Red, White and Boom (2003), The Bamboozle Festival (2007), Hardly Strictly Bluegrass (2008–2013), McKay Events Center with Vanilla Ice (2009), Illinois State Fair with Boyz II Men (2011), MusicFest (2012), Jack's Seventh Show at Verizon Wireless Amphitheatre (2012), Kool & the Gang Superjam at Outside Lands (2014), Hammer's All-star House Party Tour (2019) and 80's Weekend #9 at Microsoft Theater (2020).
