= Full Blast =

Full Blast may refer to:

- Full Blast (film), a 1999 Canadian film directed by Rodrigue Jean
- Full Blast (album), a 2004 music album by American rapper MC Hammer
