= Sagger =

Sagger may mean:

- AT-3 Sagger, NATO reporting name of 9M14 Malyutka, a Soviet anti-tank missile
- Sagger, a misspelling of saggar, a protective casing of fire clay in which delicate ceramic articles are fired
- Sagger, someone who wears their pants very low, revealing an undergarment or buttocks, see sagging (fashion)
