= Look Look Look =

Studio album by MC Hammer
- Released: July 4, 2006
- Recorded: 2005–2006
- Genres: Hip hop; hyphy
- Length: 1:16:10
- Label: Full Blast Digital Music Group

MC Hammer chronology
Full Blast (2004)	Look Look Look (2006)	Platinum MC Hammer (2008)

Singles from Look Look Look
- 1. "Look 3x" Released: 2006; 2. "Hyphy, Dumb, Buck, Krump" Released: 2006; 3. "YAY" Released: 2006; 4. "I Got It from the Town" Released: 2006; 5. "What Happened to Our Hood?" Released: 2006

Look Look Look is the ninth studio album by American rapper MC Hammer, released on July 4, 2006 from his own label Full Blast. It serves as Hammer's ninth official release and eleventh record overall.

Look Look Look was released digitally via various music services. It has sold over 300,000 copies worldwide. The album is categorized as crunk, a style of hip hop. "What Happened to Our Hood?" originally appeared on Active Duty. It features guest appearance by Lil Jon.

== Track listing ==
1. "I Got It from the Town" - 3:51
2. "Hyphy, Dumb, Buck, Krump" - 4:01
3. "YAY" (produced by Lil Jon) - 3:47
4. "HammerTime" (featuring Nox) (produced by Scott Storch) - 3:49
5. "Doing da Thizz" (produced by Scott Storch) - 3:57
6. "Look Look Look" (produced by Scott Storch) - 3:44
7. "Mash for It" (featuring Dasit & YB) - 3:24
8. "WestCoast Cha" (featuring Pleasure Ellis) - 3:45
9. "Memories" (featuring Akeiba) - 4:35
10. "I Can't Stand It" (featuring J.D. Greer) - 4:58
11. "What Happened to Our Hood?" (featuring Sam Logan) - 5:43
12. "HardTimes" (featuring IP) - 5:13
13. "I Won't Give Up (On My Life)" (featuring IP & Pleasure Ellis) - 4:01
14. "What I Got (Game to My Socks)" - 3:55
15. "Get 2 NO U" (featuring J.D. Greer & Pleasure Ellis) - 4:07
16. "Who Loves Me?" (featuring Pleasure Ellis) - 4:50
17. "Get Away" (featuring Duane) - 4:24
18. "Thankful" (featuring J.D. Greer & Pleasure Ellis) - 4:54
