= This Is the Way We Roll =

Single by Hammer

from the album Too Legit to Quit
- Released: April 16, 1992
- Genre: Hip hop
- Length: 5:53 (album version) 4:39 (radio edit)
- Label: Capitol
- Songwriter: Hammer
- Producers: Hammer, Felton Pilate

Hammer singles chronology
"Do Not Pass Me By" (1992)	"This Is the Way We Roll" (1992)	"Pumps and a Bump" (1994)

"This Is the Way We Roll" is a song by American rapper Hammer (former MC Hammer), released on April 16, 1992 by Capitol Records as the fourth single from his fourth album, Too Legit to Quit (1991). The song was featured in the film, The Addams Family, and was performed by Hammer on Saturday Night Live. It peaked at numbers 79 and 86 on the US Cash Box Top 100 and Billboard Hot 100 charts, and number 20 on the Billboard R&B chart. A music video was produced for the track as well.

== Track listing ==
1. "This Is the Way We Roll" (High Street Mix)
2. "Rollin' on Oaktown Style"
3. "Instrumental Oaktown Style"
4. "Addams Groove" (LP version)
5. "Addams Groove" (TRUE instrumental)

== Charts ==
Chart (1992)	Peak position
US Billboard Hot 100	86
US Hot R&B/Hip-Hop Songs (Billboard)	20
US Cash Box Top 100	79
