= Gangsta Lean =

1993 studio album by DRS

Studio album by DRS
- Released: October 25, 1993
- Genres: R&B; hip hop; doo wop
- Length: 52:36
- Label: Roll Wit It/Capitol
- Producer: The High Street Bank Boys (exec.)

Singles from Gangsta Lean
- 1. "Gangsta Lean" Released: 1993; 2. "Skoundrels Get Lonely" Released: March 29, 1994

Professional ratings
Review scores
Source	Rating
AllMusic	4/5 stars

Gangsta Lean is the only studio album by American contemporary R&B/hip hop group DRS, released October 25, 1993 via Hammer's Roll Wit It Entertainment (which was distributed by Capitol Records). The album peaked at No. 34 on the Billboard 200 and No. 6 on the Billboard R&B chart.

Two singles were released from the album: "Gangsta Lean" and "Skoundrels Get Lonely". However, "Gangsta Lean" was the group's only hit on the Billboard Hot 100, peaking at No. 4 in 1993. It also spent six weeks at No. 1 on the Billboard R&B chart.

In addition to original songs, the album contains a cover version of "Do Me, Baby" by Prince.

== Track listing ==
All lyrics are written by Chris Jackson except "Skoundrels Get Lonely" written by Lavell Brown; and "Do Me, Baby" written by Prince

No.	Title	Producer(s)	Length
1.	"Intro"		1:29
2.	"Mama Didn't Raise No Punk"	Chris Jackson; The Whole 9	3:48
3.	"Strip"	The Whole 9	3:49
4.	"Skoundrels Get Lonely"	Lavell Brown; The Whole 9	5:07
5.	"Gangsta Lean"	Chris Jackson; Delaney McGill; Steve Young	5:21
6.	"44 Ways"	The Whole 9	4:13
7.	"Nigga Wit a Badge"	Chris Jackson; The Whole 9	3:29
8.	"Sickness"	Chris Jackson	4:06
9.	"Bonnie and Clyde"	Chris Jackson	3:37
10.	"Do Me, Baby" (Prince cover)	Chris Jackson	3:45
11.	"Trust Me"	Chris Jackson	4:30
12.	"Make It Rough"	The Whole 9	4:25
13.	"Gangsta Lean (Gangstapella)"	Chris Jackson; Delaney McGill	3:55
14.	"Outro: Jack Move"		1:12
Total length:			52:36

== Charts ==
=== Weekly charts ===
Chart (1993)	Peak position
US Billboard 200	34
US Top R&B/Hip-Hop Albums (Billboard)	6

=== Year-end charts ===
Chart (1994)	Position
US Top R&B/Hip-Hop Albums (Billboard)	96

== Certifications ==
Region	Certification	Certified units/sales
United States (RIAA)	Gold	500,000^{^}
^{^} Shipments figures based on certification alone.
