= Yeah! Yeah! Yeah! (Oaktown's 357 song) =

"Yeah, Yeah, Yeah"

Single by Oaktown's 357

from the album Wild & Loose
- B-side: "3.5.7 Straight at You"
- Released: April 20, 1989
- Genre: Hip hop, dance
- Length: 5:19
- Label: Bust It, Capitol
- Songwriter: MC Hammer
- Producers: MC Hammer, James Earley

Oaktown's 357 singles chronology
"3.5.7 Straight at You" (1989)	"Yeah, Yeah, Yeah" (1989)	"We Like It" (1989)

"Yeah, Yeah, Yeah" is a song performed by Oaktown's 357, released as the second single from their debut album, Wild & Loose. The song was written and co-produced by MC Hammer, and released by his Bust It Records label via Capitol Records.

"Yeah, Yeah, Yeah" peaked at number 9 on the Billboard Hot Rap Singles chart in 1989.

== Chart positions ==
Chart (1989)	Peak position
US Hot Rap Songs (Billboard)	9
