= Pants on the Ground =

Single by "General" Larry Platt
- Released: February 4, 2010
- Genre: Hip hop, outsider
- Length: 3:30
- Label: American King Music
- Songwriters: Larry Platt, Carlos Thornton
- Producer: Los Vegaz

"Pants on the Ground" is a novelty song, which became the first single that civil rights activist "General" Larry Platt co-wrote. It was released via American King Music on February 4, 2010.

The song is meant to be a protest song about the practice of wearing sagging pants. The song became an internet meme after being performed during the Atlanta audition for American Idol, which aired on January 13, 2010.

== Production ==
The song was first performed in 2001 by "General" Larry Platt in the streets of Atlanta during many campaigns for elected municipal officials across the city, and he had professionally recorded it as early as 2002. The "General" was also known for performing the song publicly in events and functions around Atlanta, including a live performance at the Sweet Auburn Heritage Festival in October 2009, and Centennial Olympic Park in 2008.

Platt was encouraged to perform the song during the ninth American Idol season auditions by Sally Harley, a fellow civil rights activist. After he performed the song in response to her encouragement, it gained popularity as a viral hit. Platt's former manager Jason Mills, released the studio version of the song, without Platt's consent. The single version of the song was released on February 4, 2010, by American King Music for MP3 download where the song has reportedly sold more than 260,000 downloads.

Platt was offered deals by several labels, including Melee Entertainment and Jake Records. Others entered negotiations with Larry Platt to produce a single of the hit song, but due to the unauthorized distribution of the song by American King Music, it was difficult to navigate. It was reported that Platt's former manager intended to promote the song, servicing radio stations to gain exposure, which is a common music industry practice. Platt later secured new management under a firm based in Atlanta, headed up by Earl Little.

In 2010, Entertainment Weekly claimed "Pants on the Ground" sounded similar to "Pumps and a Bump" by MC Hammer.

== Chart performance ==
Chart performance for "Pants on the Ground"
Chart (2010)	Peak position
Canada (Canadian Hot 100)	63
US Billboard Hot 100	46

== Live performances ==
Platt performed the song outside of the 2010 Grammy Awards ceremony.

The song was performed at the American Idol finale by Platt, accompanied by William Hung, and a crew of dancers who dropped their pants as part of the act.

During some concerts, Florida-based Christian rock band Among the Thirsty, performs a verse from "Pants on the Ground" during the song "One Sound."

The song returned to American Idol on April 7, 2016 (for a short moment during the series finale), as an interjection performance while "No" by Meghan Trainor was sung by other American Idol alumni.

== Parodies ==
Several celebrities performed the song, in the days that followed the original airing of Platt's audition. This included late night talk show host Jimmy Fallon, who performed a version of the song while also impersonating Neil Young on his show Late Night with Jimmy Fallon. NFL quarterback and Green Bay Packers legend, Brett Favre, was also caught leading the Minnesota Vikings in a performance of the song in their locker room (following their game against the Dallas Cowboys in the 2009–10 NFL playoffs).

Today hosts Meredith Vieira, Matt Lauer, Al Roker and Ann Curry also organized a performance of the song. Additionally, Canadian MLA T. J. Burke performed a rendition of the song in criticizing Progressive Conservative opposition leader David Alward, during a session of the New Brunswick provincial legislature. Platt himself made a subsequent appearance on ABC's The View on January 18, 2010 (where he performed the song in its entirety).

"Pants on the Ground" was also sung during WWE's 2010 Royal Rumble PPV event, in a backstage segment between Theodore Long, Cryme Tyme, Ranjin Singh and The Great Khali. Tyler Perry as his character Mabel "Madea" Simmons, performed the Madea remix to this song in the play Madea's Big Happy Family, which he had written for the stage.
