= DRS (band) =

American contemporary R&B group

- Also known as: Dirty Rotten Scoundrels
- Origin: Sacramento, California, U.S.
- Genres: R&B
- Years active: 1990s
- Labels: Capitol Records
- Past members: Endo; Pic; Jail Bait; Deuce Deuce; Ejay "Blunt" Turner

DRS (Dirty Rotten Scoundrels) was an American contemporary R&B group from Sacramento, California.

Their biggest success was the hit single, "Gangsta Lean" (which spent six weeks at No. 1 on the Billboard R&B chart), from the album Gangsta Lean. It was released under Hammer's talent company, Roll Wit It Entertainment.

A top selling song of the year at the time, "Gangsta Lean" has sold over 2.5 million copies, with over 24.5 million views on YouTube.

DRS was discovered by the production team, The Whole 9. When The Whole 9 signed a production deal with Hammer's Roll Wit It Entertainment, they brought DRS with them, and Hammer made the deal to sign them to Capitol Records. They were part of the music group Black Men United, and appeared on the Jason's Lyric soundtrack (1994).

The lead singer of the group has a daughter, Aranesa Turner (born in 1993), who is a Christian pop singer from Sacramento.

== Discography ==
Year	Title	Peak chart positions	
Year	Title	US	US R&B
1993	Gangsta Lean: Released: October 25, 1993; Label: Roll Wit It/Capitol	34	6

== Singles ==
Year	Title	Chart positions				
Year	Title	U.S.	U.S. DSS	U.S. R&B	U.S. Rhythm	AUS
1993	"Gangsta Lean"	4	1	1	2	86
1995	"Scoundrels Get Lonely"	-	-	87	-	-
