= Gangsta Lean (song) =

1993 single by DRS

Single by DRS

from the album Gangsta Lean
- Released: October 6, 1993
- Genre: R&B
- Length: 5:35 (album version); 4:00 (single edit)
- Label: Roll Wit It/Capitol
- Songwriters: Taura Stinson; Milton Turner; Tracy Carter; Chris J. Jackson
- Producer: The Whole 9

DRS singles chronology
"Gangsta Lean" (1993)	"Skoundrels Get Lonely" (1994)

"Gangsta Lean" is a song by American contemporary R&B/hip hop group DRS, issued in October 1993 as the first single from their debut studio album of the same name (1993). The song spent six weeks at No. 1 on the US Billboard R&B chart. It was the group's only hit on the Billboard Hot 100, peaking at No. 4 in 1993. The Recording Industry Association of America awarded it a platinum certification, selling over 1.1 million copies domestically. Its highest chart peak was on the New Zealand Singles Chart, where it spent three weeks at No. 1.

The single was released under Hammer's talent company, Roll Wit It Entertainment. A top selling song of the year at the time, "Gangsta Lean" has sold over 2.5 million copies with over 23.5 million views on YouTube. It was sampled by Juelz Santana on the album From Me to U in the outro song "This Is for My Homies".

== Charts ==
=== Weekly charts ===
Chart (1993–1994)	Peak position
Australia (ARIA)	86
New Zealand (Recorded Music NZ)	1
US Billboard Hot 100	4
US Hot Dance Singles Sales (Billboard)	1
US Hot R&B/Hip-Hop Songs (Billboard)	1
US Rhythmic Top 40 (Billboard)	2
US Cash Box Top 100	6

=== Year-end charts ===
Chart (1993)	Position
US Hot R&B/Hip-Hop Songs (Billboard)	50

Chart (1994)	Position
New Zealand (Recorded Music NZ)	17
US Billboard Hot 100	39
US Hot R&B/Hip-Hop Songs (Billboard)	26
US Cash Box Top 100	43

== Certifications ==
Region	Certification	Certified units/sales
United States (RIAA)	Platinum	1,000,000^{^}
^{^} Shipments figures based on certification alone.

== See also ==
- List of number-one R&B singles of 1993 (U.S.)
- List of number-one singles from the 1990s (New Zealand)
