= Too Legit to Quit =

Studio album by Hammer
- Released: October 29, 1991
- Genres: Hip hop; dance; pop rap
- Length: 70:53
- Labels: Capitol; EMI
- Producers: Hammer, Felton Pilate

Hammer chronology
Please Hammer Don't Hurt 'Em (1990)	Too Legit to Quit (1991)	The Funky Headhunter (1994)

Singles from Too Legit to Quit
- 1. "2 Legit 2 Quit" Released: September 5, 1991; 2. "Addams Groove" Released: December 17, 1991; 3. "Do Not Pass Me By" Released: January 23, 1992; 4. "This Is the Way We Roll" Released: April 16, 1992

Professional ratings
Review scores
Source	Rating
AllMusic	3/5 stars
Entertainment Weekly	B+
NME	3/10
The New York Times	(Positive)

Too Legit to Quit is the fourth studio album by American rapper Hammer (after removing M.C. from his name), released on October 29, 1991. Produced by Hammer and Felton Pilate, the album was released via Capitol Records and EMI Records. Considered the last album of a trilogy with Let's Get It Started (1988) and Please Hammer Don't Hurt 'Em (1990), it incorporates Hip Hop, pop rap and dance with elements of gospel and R&B with lyrical content ranging from positivity and love to social conscious.

Too Legit to Quit received positive reviews with some critics praising for not using samples, the use of live instruments on the recording process and Hammer rap abilities and charisma while others criticized the repetitive lyrics and formulaic structure of the songs. The album was supported by the official release of the singles "2 Legit 2 Quit", "Do Not Pass Me By", "This Is the Way We Roll", and "Addams Groove", the latter of which received a nomination for Best Rap Solo Performance at the 35th Annual Grammy Awards.

Too Legit to Quit received moderate success compared to his previous album. It peaked at number two at US Billboard at was certified three-time platinum by the RIAA, while the first two singles of the album ("2 Legit 2 Quit" and "Addams Groove") reached the top 10 at the Billboard Hot 100 and other territories. Also, it has been certified silver in the UK by the British Phonographic Industry, and triple platinum in the US by the Recording Industry Association of America. The album sold more than 5 million copies worldwide.

To promote the album, Hammer and Capitol started a large-scale advertising campaign and embarked on the Too Legit To Quit World Tour in 1992.

== Background ==
During its first year of release, Hammer's third studio album Please Hammer Don`t Hurt Em (1990) sold 14.5 million copies worldwide. Recording sessions for Too Legit to Quit started in August 1990. In an interview in February 1991, Hammer stated that he had been working on his follow up album for around six months and would be titled "Releasing Some Pressure". Also, he stated that the album was going to be ready for public consumption by late 1991 or early 1992 and anticipated that the project was going to be "more exciting" and "better quality".

During the late summer 1991, MC Hammer decided to drop the MC from his artistic name to just Hammer. On August 31, 1991, Billboard stated that Producer-songwriter-engineer Felton Pilate that worked on Hammer previous album was working as a co-producer on a new album with the artist and the titled was "Too Legit to Quit, combining traditional songwriting and real singers with Hammer's raps.

According to the magazine Music & Media, the album was considered the last album of the trilogy after Let's Get It Started (1988) and Please Hammer Don't Hurt 'Em (1990), following the same type of danceable tunes. However, less dependent on sampling, than on previous releases. Apart from the Timmy Thomas cover "Tell Me (Why Can't We Live Together)" and the gospel standard "Do Not Pass Me By", the Hammer wrote 11 out of the 13 tracks in collaboration with co -producer Felton C. Pilate H. Hammer stated that the album was recorded with a real live band featuring a horn section.

On September 7, 1991, ABC started broadcast of Hammer's children cartoon "Hammerman", joining the channel's Saturday morning cartoon lineup. On September 13, 1991, it was announced to the press that the lead single was "2 Legit 2 Quit" and would be released to the airways on October 7, 1991 On September 21, 1991, HBO aired a television special "Influences: James Brown and M.C. Hammer. On October 15, 1991 the cover of the album was revealed to the press on a press conference in Los Angeles.

Just a few days before the album been released a Capital Records announced Capitol Records its largest marketing campaign ever to promote the new album. Elements of the Hammer promotional plan are discussed, including promotional videoclips, a Saturday morning cartoon show and a new Pepsi commercial featuring his music. At the released day, the record company stated that 2.5 millions of copies were shipped and has spent $1.5 million on a TV ad campaign and $1 million on store displays.

== Promotion and tour ==
The marketing campaign for Too Legit To Quit was the largest in the history of Capitol Records at the time, including a $1 million of prerelease TV ad campaign, the music video for "2 Legit 2 Quit", that remains one of the most expensive ever made with cameos by James Brown and several sports figures, including the Oakland A's' Jose Canseco and the Detroit Pistons' Isaiah Thomas. According to the label, the campaign was focused to concentrating on the preteen market and also targets men 24 and older by keying into professional sports. The plan was "designed to ensure the new album locks up the No. 1 album -chart slot from release through Christmas and into next year".

The campaign started with the release of the singles "2 Legit 2 Quit" and "This Is The Way We Roll" to clubs Sept. 30, 1991. The former was released to radio Oct. 7, but the cassette single, CD -5, and 12 -inch will not be available at retail until October 28, the day before the album release. Also, the cassette was sold at Toys 'R' Us stores. Hammer was set to do interviews on a CBS Sports NFL pregame show, and, according to Jean Riggins, Capitol VP of artist development, copies of the "2 Legit 2 Quit" video was shipped to the home stadiums and arenas of the 24 pro athletes featured in the video, to be shown on scoreboard screens during games.

The track "Addams Groove", appeared on both The Addams Family motion picture soundtrack, released on November 22, 1991, along with cross-promotional posters and counter cards for retail outlets and movie theaters. The track appeared in the film's prerelease in-theater, radio, and TV advertising campaigns. On November 29, 1991, released 15,000 specially packaged CDs of the album; the disc which sported a custom die cut metal gatefold cover that resembles ads for the album.

The track "Count It Off" was used as the fifth and final ending theme for the anime series Obocchama-kun in 1992, where it was retitled Go! Go! Hammer-chama (Count It Off) (GO! GO! ハマちゃま (COUNT IT OFF)) for its broadcast and single. It was not included on the DVD release of the series due to copyright issues.

The initial plan included, promotional videoclips for 12 of the album's 17 songs, e two longform videos featuring the new material. The first longform, "Too Legit To Quit," is set for was set to release in December 1991; it included at least four clips and interview footage. Also, a month long, $500,000 prerelease television ad campaign will feature snippets of the "2 Legit 2 Quit" video. The clips ran on ESPN, BET, MTV, the Video Tukebox Network, and Fox affiliates. A second TV blitz is set for the week of Dec.15-22 of 1991. Also, a Pepsi commercial with the track was released on the same month. On December 7, 1991, Hammer hosted "Saturday Night Live" earning the program its highest rating in seven years. Hammer was the first black recording artist to both host and perform on the show, and the first rap artist to ever host the show at the time. Also, hosted the 1992 American Music Awards. On April 3, 1992, CBS aired a TV special titled "Hammer From The Heart".

In Europe, a major TV campaign was set up with MTV Europe, showing six 30 -second spots daily from October 28 to November 11, 1991. The same spot, plus a 20-second version, is being used for nationwide TV campaigns in Germany, France, Holland, Belgium, Sweden, Denmark, Finland, Norway, Italy and Spain along with a radio campaign in Germany, France, Switzerland, Norway, Italy and Spain. Print advertising is running throughout Europe. Apart from the usual merchandising material, braces are available in the famous Hammer "H" logo. A special press kit containing a bio, the CD and an E.P.K. is serviced to all European key media.

The large-scale advertising campaign and world tour indicated that Capitol Records was expecting Too Legit To Quit to replicate or exceed Hammer's previous successes, and were strongly supportive of his career. Given the recording and promotional costs in relation to music sales, Too Legit To Quit was not likely as profitable as Hammer or Capitol Records may have hoped. However, ticket and merchandise sales for Hammer's Pepsi and MTV-sponsored world tour likely generated massive exposure and millions of dollars in revenue, thus allowing Hammer to sustain his reputation as a very popular performer.

Hammer set out on a world tour for Too Legit to Quit, but the stage show had become as lavish as his lifestyle. The Too Legit to Quit World Tour began with two sold-out concerts in March 1992, at the 50,000 capacity Tokyo Dome. Capitol Records was prepared to allow the tour to continue for at least two years, although it ultimately would run for slightly less than that. Loaded with singers, dancers and backup musicians, the supporting concert tour was too expensive for the album's sales to finance. Therefore, it was canceled partway through. In 1992, Boyz II Men joined Hammer's high-profile tour as an opening act. While traveling the country, their tour manager Khalil Roundtree was murdered in Chicago, and the group's future performances of "It's So Hard to Say Goodbye to Yesterday" were dedicated to him. As a result of this unfortunate experience, the song would help advance their success. Other opening acts for the tour included Jodeci and Mary J. Blige.

== Commercial reception ==
=== Album ===
The album debut at number three on the US Billboard on the week ending November 16, 1991, selling over 93,000 copies. The following week it peaked at number two selling 137,000 copies. Eventually it peaked at number two and remained on the top 5 for 16 consecutive weeks. By February 1993, it was certified three platinum by the Recording Industry Association of America for selling three million copies in the United States. As of 1994, it sold 3.4 million copies in the United States.

On the release day, an estimate of 2.5 million copies were shipped worldwide. It debut and peaked at number eight in Canada album charts. The album managed to sell more than five million copies and two of its singles exceeded 500,000 copies sold. Eventually, the album sold over 5 million copies worldwide. However, this was below the label expectation of 10–15 million copies, as much as his previous record, Please Hammer Don't Hurt`Em (1990).

=== Singles ===
"2 Legit 2 Quit" proved to be successful in the U.S., peaking at No. 5 on the Billboard Hot 100. Another hit came soon after with "Addams Groove", which appeared on both The Addams Family motion picture soundtrack, and the vinyl and cassette versions of "2 Legit 2 Quit"). It reached No. 7 in the U.S. and No. 4 in the UK. Despite the album's multi-platinum certification, the sales were one-third of those of Please Hammer Don't Hurt 'Em.

== Music videos ==
Several music videos were produced for all four charting singles released. The music video for "Addams Groove" appeared before The Addams Family film.

The music video for "2 Legit 2 Quit" included many celebrity appearances. It was ranked one of the most expensive videos ever produced. The hand gestures used within the video became very popular as was the catchphrase itself. At the end of the video, after James Brown enlists Hammer to obtain the glove of Michael Jackson, a silver-white sequined glove is shown on the hand of a Jackson look-alike doing the "2 Legit 2 Quit" hand motions. It was a reference to Hammer wanting to challenge Jackson to a dance-off, for rights to his famous glove, which is also referenced on the album.

Andy Samberg's character in the film Hot Rod, pays tribute to Hammer's hand gestures from the music video, with his explanation of no longer being "legit" so he must quit.

Hammer appeared on The Wendy Williams Show on July 27, 2009. He told a story about a phone call he received from Michael Jackson, regarding the portion of the "2 Legit 2 Quit" video that included a purported Jackson, giving his approval and inclusion of it. He explained how Jackson had seen the video and liked it, and both expressed they were a fan of each other. Hammer and Jackson would later appear, speak and perform at the funeral service for James Brown in 2006.

A compilation album of music videos from this album were released on VHS in 1992 and DVD in 2002, entitled M.C. Hammer: 2 Legit - The Videos (102 minutes).

== Track listing ==
All tracks are written by Stanley K. Burrell and Felton C. Pilate, except where noted.

No.	Title	Writer(s)	Length
1.	"This Is the Way We Roll"		5:53
2.	"Brothers Hang On"	S. Burrell; Pilate; Norman Whitfield	7:12
3.	"2 Legit 2 Quit"	S. Burrell; Pilate; James Earley; Michael Kelly; Louis K. Burrell	5:33
4.	"Living in a World Like This"		5:29
5.	"Tell Me (Why Can't We Live Together)"	S. Burrell; Pilate; Timmy Thomas	6:38
6.	"Releasing Some Pressure"		5:03
7.	"Find Yourself a Friend"		3:57
8.	"Count It Off"		5:07
9.	"Good to Go"		4:54
10.	"Lovehold"		4:55
11.	"Street Soldiers"		5:00
12.	"Do Not Pass Me By"		5:31
13.	"Gaining Momentum"	S. Burrell; Pilate; Buckholtz	5:41
Total length:			70:53

The cassette tape version of this album is considerably longer, with the addition of four songs (two of which are remixes). After "Find Yourself a Friend" there follows "Rollin' on (Oaktown Style)" (5:50). After "Gaining Momentum" is "Burn It Up" (4:28). The last two songs on the album are "Addams Groove" (3:54) and "Street Soldiers (Saxapella Reprise)" (4:56). The total run time is 1:29:00 (89 minutes).

The double LP release included bonus tracks "Addams Groove", "Burn It Up" and "Street Soldiers (Saxapella Reprise)". It omits "Rollin' on (Oaktown Style)". This version also re-arranges the track listing to accommodate for equal side length across the four sides.

== Charts ==
=== Weekly charts ===
Weekly chart performance for Too Legit to Quit
Chart (1991–1992)	Peak position
Australian Albums (ARIA)	84
Canadian Albums (RPM)	8
German Albums (Offizielle Top 100)	49
Hungarian Albums (MAHASZ)	27
Irish Albums (IFPI)	8
Japanese Albums (Oricon)	5
New Zealand Albums (RMNZ)	14
UK Albums (OCC)	41
US Billboard 200	2

=== Year-end charts ===
Year-end chart performance for Too Legit to Quit
Chart (1992)	Position
US Billboard 200	9

== Certifications ==
Region	Certification	Certified units/sales
Japan (RIAJ)	Platinum	200,000^{^}
United Kingdom (BPI)	Silver	60,000^{^}
United States (RIAA)	3× Platinum	3,000,000^{^}
^{^} Shipments figures based on certification alone.
