= Pumps and a Bump =

- Single cover

Single by Hammer

from the album The Funky Headhunter
- Released: February 28, 1994
- Recorded: 1993
- Genre: West Coast hip-hop
- Length: 5:05
- Label: Giant
- Songwriters: Stanley Burrell; Gerald Baillergeau; Deuce Deuce; George Clinton; Garry Shider; David Spradley
- Producers: Hammer; Gerald Baillergeau

Hammer singles chronology
"This Is the Way We Roll" (1992)	"Pumps and a Bump" (1994)	"It's All Good" (1994)

"Pumps and a Bump" is a song by American rapper Hammer (former MC Hammer), released on February 28, 1994, by Giant Records as the first single from his fifth album, The Funky Headhunter (1994). The song was both co-written and co-produced by Hammer, and peaked at No. 3 on the US Billboard Hot Rap Songs chart, and No. 26 and 60 on the Billboard Hot 100 and Cash Box Top 100 charts, making it the final Top 40 hit of Hammer's career. "Pumps and a Bump" represented a departure from the rapper's previous pop image, and contains a sample of George Clinton's 1982 single "Atomic Dog".

== Critical reception ==
Larry Flick from Billboard magazine wrote, "Preview of the forthcoming The Funky Headhunter collection (which also marks a label switch from Capitol to Giant) shows a new and improved Hammer. The bloated pomp and circumstance has been replaced by a gritty jack-swing groove and an electro-funk tone worthy of George Clinton. Track does not instantly hit you over the head, but it does crawl up your spine and sneak into your brain after a couple of spins. Once that happens, you won't be able to stop humming the melody. A smash." Pan-European magazine Music & Media stated, "Words and rhythm are in perfect harmony. Based on a sample from P-funk president George Clinton's 'Atomic Dog', this uncensored sex anthem is set to the perfect pulse." James Hamilton from the Record Mirror Dance Update described it as a "cheerfully sexist chanting and jiggling catchy P'funk jackswinger" in his weekly dance column.

== Music video ==
The original music video for "Pumps and a Bump" featured Hammer wearing nothing but a Speedo and dancing suggestively alongside numerous swimsuit-clad women, which resulted in it being banned from MTV as it was considered too graphic. An alternative video was filmed with Hammer fully clothed and featuring an appearance by Deion Sanders, while promoted as representing a remix of the song. The video was nominated for Best Choreography at the 1994 MTV Video Music Awards.

== Impact ==
In 2010, American Idol contestant Larry Platt performed his own song titled "Pants on the Ground", which Entertainment Weekly claimed sounded similar to "Pumps and a Bump". Spin magazine described the banned music video as "'Elvis on the Ed Sullivan Show' cranked to 11".

== Charts ==
=== Weekly charts ===
Chart (1994)	Peak position
New Zealand (Recorded Music NZ)	41
UK Club Chart (Music Week)	53
US Billboard Hot 100	26
US Hot Dance Club Songs (Billboard)	34
US Hot R&B/Hip-Hop Songs (Billboard)	21
US Hot Rap Songs (Billboard)	3
US Cash Box Top 100	60

=== Year-end charts ===
Chart (1994)	Position
US Hot Rap songs	50

== Certifications ==
Region	Certification	Certified units/sales
United States (RIAA)	Gold	500,000^{^}
^{^} Shipments figures based on certification alone.
