= Addams Groove =

1991 single by Hammer

Single by Hammer

from the album Too Legit to Quit and Greatest Hits
- Released: December 9, 1991
- Genre: Pop-rap
- Length: 3:58
- Label: Capitol
- Songwriters: Stanley Kirk Burrell; Felton Pilate; Vic Mizzy

Hammer singles chronology
"2 Legit 2 Quit" (1991)	"Addams Groove" (1991)	"Do Not Pass Me By" (1992)

"Addams Groove" is a song by American hip-hop artist Hammer, that was released as the theme song to the 1991 film The Addams Family. Released in December 1991 by Capitol Records, it was the second single from his fourth album, Too Legit to Quit (1991), included in the track list for the cassette version of the album but not the CD. The song was his fifth and last top-10 hit in the United States, peaking at number seven and 21 on the Billboard Hot 100 and Cash Box Top 100 charts. "Adams Groove" was the recipient of the Golden Raspberry Award for Worst Original Song at the 12th Golden Raspberry Awards in 1992.

== Music video ==
A music video was produced to promote the single. It featured Hammer and several of his dancers performing in their unique style around the Addams mansion as well as most of the cast of the film. The video opens with Hammer pleading with Wednesday (Christina Ricci) and Pugsley (Jimmy Workman) to refrain from chopping his head off with a guillotine. It concludes with several scenes taking place in the Addamses' backyard cemetery, including Thing crawling up and down a Hammer dancer and Gomez (Raúl Juliá) dueling in a sword-fight with Hammer over Morticia (Anjelica Huston). During filming, MC Hammer played many pranks on set, including filling Uncle Fester's shoes with Vegemite.

The music video was played prior to the beginning of the film during its theatrical release. The video also features a 13-year old Jimmy Rollins as an extra.

== Track listing ==
- CD single
1. "Addams Groove" (LP Version) – 3:58
2. "Addams Groove" (Instrumental) – 3:55
3. "2 Legit 2 Quit" – 5:02
- Japan Mini CD single
1. "Addams Groove" – 3:58
2. "Addams Groove" (Instrumental) – 3:55
- UK 7" vinyl single
1. A. "Addams Groove" (L.P. Mix) – 3:58
2. B. "Street Soldiers" (Saxapella Reprise) – 5:02
- UK 12" vinyl single
1. "Addams Groove" (L.P. Mix) – 3:58
2. "Addams Groove" (Instrumental) – 3:55
3. "Street Soldiers" (Saxapella Reprise) – 5:02
4. "2 Legit 2 Quit" (Edit) – 4:00

== Charts ==
=== Weekly charts ===
Chart (1991–1992)	Peak Position
Australia (ARIA)	12
Austria (Ö3 Austria Top 40)	10
Belgium (Ultratop 50 Flanders)	27
Canada Top Singles (RPM)	67
Finland (Suomen virallinen lista)	9
France (SNEP)	10
Germany (GfK)	21
Ireland (IRMA)	4
Luxembourg (Radio Luxembourg)	7
Netherlands (Dutch Top 40)	14
Netherlands (Single Top 100)	16
New Zealand (Recorded Music NZ)	9
Sweden (Sverigetopplistan)	31
Switzerland (Schweizer Hitparade)	21
UK Singles (Official Charts)	4
UK Airplay (Music Week)	5
UK Dance (Music Week)	31
US Billboard Hot 100	7
US Cash Box Top 100	21

=== Year-end charts ===
Chart (1992)	Position
US Billboard Hot 100	76

== Certifications ==
Region	Certification	Certified units/sales
United States (RIAA)	Gold	500,000^{^}
^{^} Shipments figures based on certification alone.
