= Larry Platt =

American civil and political rights activist and rapper

- Born: August 27, 1947 (age 78); St. Louis, Missouri
- Occupation: Civil rights activist
- Known for: Performance of viral video Pants on the Ground

Larry "General" Platt (born August 27, 1947) is an American civil and political rights activist and rapper who gained fame with his performance of "Pants on the Ground" on the ninth season of American Idol. The song was released on iTunes and received over 150,000 hits. As of June 2023, the video has received over 11 million views on YouTube.

== Nickname and Civil Rights Work ==
Platt earned his nickname during the American Civil Rights Movement in which he was an active participant. Rev. Hosea Williams coined the nickname on behalf of his heroic efforts in support of the movement. In 2005, the Georgia House of Representatives commended and recognized Larry for his contributions and work in Atlanta.

== American Idol ==
During auditions for the ninth season of American Idol in Atlanta, Platt appeared and performed his own original song, "Pants on the Ground". Platt, who at the time was 62, was ineligible to continue due to being over the show's age limit of 28. However, his audition has since become a viral hit, with over 11 million views on YouTube. He was invited to perform the song during the season finale.

On the original series finale in 2016, Platt again returned to perform a few lines of "Pants on the Ground" as part of the show's pop medley.

== Discography ==
=== Singles ===
Year	Single	Peak		Sales
Year	Single	US	CAN	Sales
2010	"Pants on the Ground"	46	63	Sales: 150,000

== See also ==
- Sagging (fashion)
