= Wild & Loose =

Studio album by Oaktown's 357
- Released: March 21, 1989
- Genres: Hip hop, dance
- Length: 40:00
- Label: Bust It/Capitol
- Producers: MC Hammer, James Earley

Oaktown's 357 chronology
Wild & Loose (1989)	Fully Loaded (1991)

Singles from Wild & Loose
- 1. "3.5.7 Straight at You" Released: 1989; 2. "Yeah, Yeah, Yeah" Released: April 20, 1989; 3. "We Like It" Released: 1990; 4. "Juicy Gotcha Krazy" Released: 1989

Wild & Loose is the debut album by American hip hop group Oaktown's 357, released in 1989. The album was produced by MC Hammer and James Earley, via Hammer's Bust It Records label and Capitol Records.

The album peaked at number 126 on the Billboard 200, and at number 23 on the Top R&B Albums chart. The single "Yeah, Yeah, Yeah" peaked at number 9 on the Billboard Hot Rap Songs chart.

"Stupid Def Ya'll" was originally released by Hammer (a.k.a. the Holy Ghost Boy and the Posse) as "Stupid Def Yal" in 1987.

== Critical reception ==
The Washington Post stated that "the members of the trio occasionally hand off lines to each other in Beastie Boys style, but the deft, atmospheric backing tracks are frequently the stars here."

Rap Reviews gave the song, lyrics and music video an overall score of four.

== Track listing ==
All tracks are written by MC Hammer, except "Say That Then", written by Oaktown's 3.5.7.

No.	Title	Length
1.	"We Like It"	4:21
2.	"Say That Then"	4:08
3.	"Rock 'n' Soul"	4:25
4.	"It's a Shame"	3:52
5.	"3.5.7 Straight at You"	3:50
6.	"Yeah, Yeah, Yeah"	5:19
7.	"Juicy Gotcha Krazy"	4:23
8.	"Stupid Def Ya'll"	4:32
9.	"I Betcha Wanna Take It"	5:02
Total length:		40:00

== Chart positions ==
Chart (1989)	Peak position
US Billboard 200	126
US Top R&B Albums (Billboard)	23
