= Full Blast (album) =

2004 studio album by MC Hammer

Studio album by MC Hammer
- Released: January 31, 2004
- Recorded: 2003
- Genre: Hip hop; R&B
- Label: Full Blast Digital Music Group
- Producer: MC Hammer

MC Hammer chronology
Active Duty (2001)	Full Blast (2004)	Look Look Look (2006)

Singles from Full Blast
- 1. "Full Blast" Released: 2004

Full Blast is the eighth studio album by American rapper MC Hammer released on January 31, 2004 by his label, Full Blast Digital Music Group.

The album was recorded in 2003 and released in early 2004 on Hammer's Full Blast label. Produced by Hammer himself, the album was not well received both critically or commercially, nor charted or spawned any hit singles. The lack of attention, although easily accessible online, was due in part to so many instrumental mixes dominating the album.

The lead single and title track, "Full Blast" includes disses towards Eminem and Busta Rhymes. Guest artists included The Stooge Playaz, Pleasure, JD Greer and DasIt.

== Track listing ==
1. "Sunshine in Summertime" (featuring Pleasure)
2. "Full Blast"
3. "Hard Times"
4. "I Won't Give Up"
5. "I Used to Love Her" (featuring Pleasure)
6. "Sunshine in Summertime" (instrumental mix)
7. "Full Blast" (instrumental mix)
8. "Hard Times" (instrumental mix)
9. "I Won't Give Up" (instrumental mix)
10. "I Used to Love Her" (instrumental mix)
