= Sagging (fashion) =

Manner of wearing pants

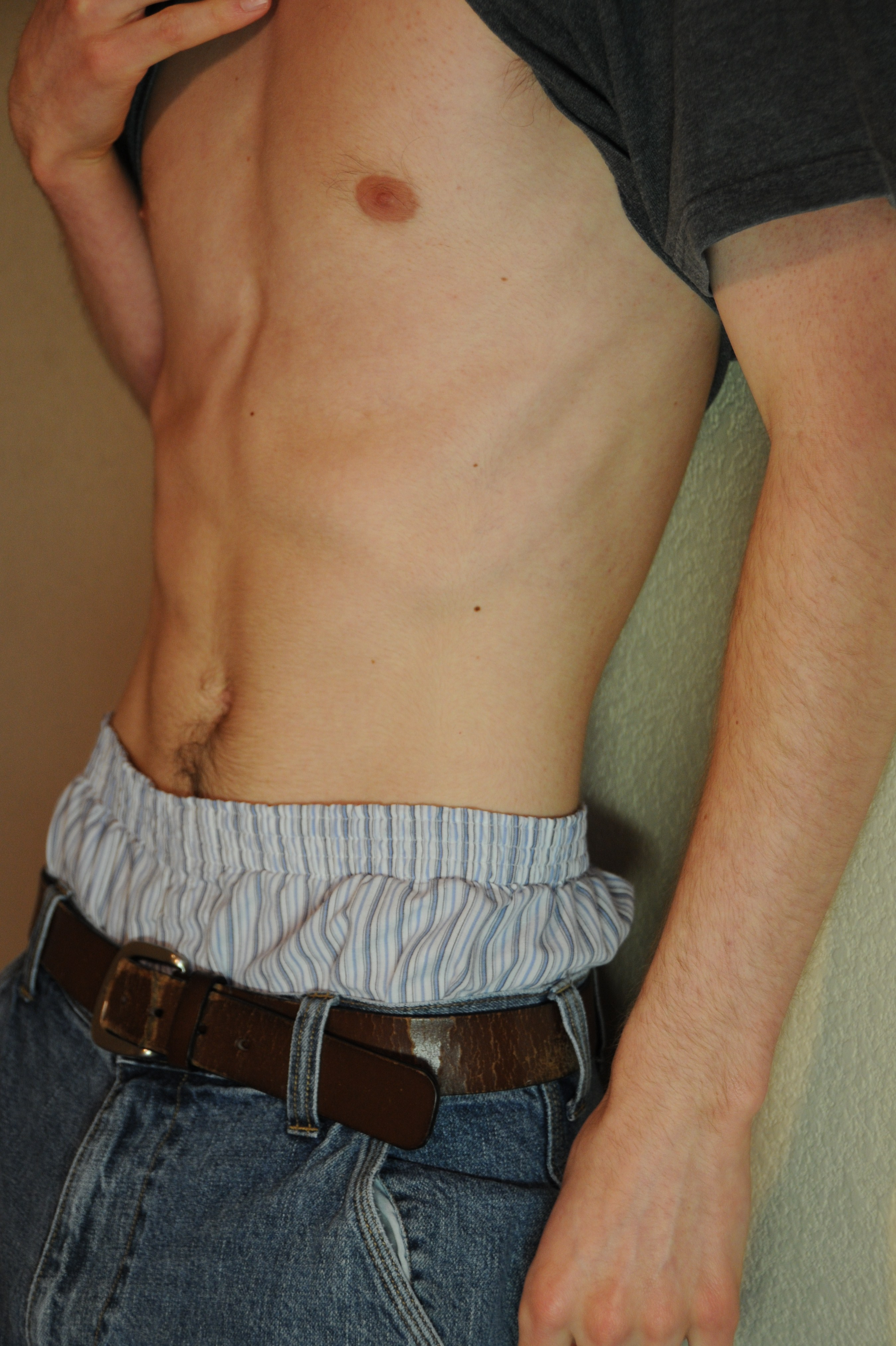
A man sagging his jeans to show off his boxer shorts

Sagging is a manner of wearing trousers that sag so that the top of the trousers or jeans is significantly below the waist, sometimes revealing much of the wearer's underpants.

Sagging is predominantly a male fashion. Women's wearing of low-rise jeans to reveal their thong underwear (the "whale tail") is not generally described as sagging. A person wearing sagging trousers is sometimes called a "sagger", and in some countries this practice is known as "low-riding".

== Origin ==
The style was popularized by hip-hop musicians in the 1990s.

It is often said that the style originated from the United States prison system where belts may be prohibited to prevent their use for self-harm, and clothing provided is often over-sized, leading to sagging trousers.

Another origin story states that men who wanted to present themselves as sexually available to other men sagged their trousers to display their buttocks, which came to be perceived as a mark of having been incarcerated, giving the wearer street cred.

When the trend started, boxer shorts were generally the underpants of choice for male saggers. This expanded to boxer briefs when those became popular.

== North America ==
=== United States ===
==== Reaction ====
During the 2000s, many North American local governments, school systems, transit agencies, and even airlines passed laws and regulations against the practice of wearing sagging pants, although no state or federal laws have been enacted banning the practice. US presidential candidate Barack Obama, speaking just before the 2008 U.S. presidential election, appeared on MTV and said that laws banning the practice of wearing low-slung pants that expose one's underwear were "a waste of time ... Having said that, brothers should pull up their pants. You are walking by your mother, your grandmother, your underwear is showing. What's wrong with that? Come on. Some people might not want to see your underwear. I'm one of them."

In June 2007, the Town Council of Delcambre, Louisiana, passed an indecent exposure ordinance, which prohibited intentionally wearing trousers in such a way as to show underwear. In March 2008, the Hahira, Georgia, City Council passed a controversial clothing ordinance, in the name of public safety, that bans citizens from wearing pants with top below the waist that reveal skin or undergarments. The council was split 2–2, but the tie was broken by the mayor. Pagedale, Missouri, is another to have passed this law in 2008.

Benetta Standly, statewide organizer for the American Civil Liberties Union (ACLU) of Georgia stated, "In Atlanta, we see this as racial profiling ... It's going to target African-American male youths. There's a fear with people associating the way you dress with crimes being committed." The interim police chief of Flint, Michigan, ordered the arrest of saggers for disorderly conduct; however, as of August 2008, only warnings had been issued. The local chapter of the ACLU threatened legal action in response, saying that sagging did not violate the Flint disorderly conduct ordinance and a Florida judge threw out a case brought under a similar rule, as being unconstitutional.

Sagging clothing is a violation of some school dress codes, and the prohibition has been supported in the court system.

Two weeks after the "Pants on the Ground" video became popular due to American Idol (see below), a billboard campaign against the style of sagging pants was launched in the Dallas, Texas, area. The billboards feature Big Mama Joseph from the 1997 film Soul Food saying, "Pull 'Em Up!" and asks youngsters to "Keep it a secret!" The campaign is the brainchild of Dallas Mayor Pro Tem Dwaine R. Caraway, and uses advertising space donated by Clear Channel Outdoor. Another billboard campaign against sagging pants was launched in Brooklyn, New York, by New York State Senator Eric Adams on March 28, 2010. In May 2010, New York State Senate President Malcolm Smith used US$2,200 from his campaign fund to launch a similar campaign in Queens.

In the fall of 2010 at Westside Middle School in Memphis, Tennessee, the policy on handling sagging pants is for students to pull them up or get "Urkeled", a reference to the character Steve Urkel of the 1990s television show Family Matters. In this practice, teachers would pull their pants up and attach them there using zip ties. Students would also have their photo taken and posted on a board in the hallway, for all of their classmates to see. In an interview with WMC-TV, Principal Bobby White stated that the general idea is to fight pop culture with pop culture. One teacher at the school claimed to have "Urkeled" up to 80 students per week, although after five weeks students got the message, and the number dropped to 18.

On November 23, 2010, Albany, Georgia, passed a city ordinance that banned the wearing of pants or skirts with top more than three inches below the top of the hips, and imposed a fine of $25 for the first offense, increasing to up to $250 for subsequent offenses. By September 2011, City Attorney Nathan Davis reported that 187 citations had been issued and fines of $3,916 collected.

On December 8, 2010, the city of Opa-locka, Florida, voted unanimously on a $250 fine or 10 hours of community service for individuals who did not pull their pants up.

In Fort Worth, Texas, the local transportation authority implemented a policy in June 2011 that prohibited any passenger from boarding a bus while wearing sagging pants that exposes their underwear or buttocks. Signs were posted on buses saying, "Pull 'em up or find another ride", and one City Council member was looking for funds for a billboard campaign. The communications manager for the Fort Worth Transportation Authority said that on the first day the policy was enforced, 50 people were removed from buses for wearing improper pants. Some complained about the policy, but the overall response was positive.

A state law went into effect in Florida for the 2011–2012 school year banning the practice of sagging while at school. Pupils found in violation would receive a verbal warning for the first offense, followed by parental notification by the principal for the second offense, which would require the parent to bring a change of clothing to school. Students would then face in-school suspension for subsequent violations.

University of New Mexico football player Deshon Marman was removed from a U.S. Airways flight bound for Albuquerque, New Mexico for wearing sagging pants. A few months later, Green Day singer Billie Joe Armstrong was removed from a Southwest Airlines flight from Oakland to Burbank, California, for the same reason.

In April 2012, Alabama County Circuit Judge John Bush sentenced 20-year-old LaMarcus Ramsey to three days in jail for appearing in court with sagging blue jeans that exposed his underwear, telling him, "You are in contempt of court because you showed your butt in court."

On June 12, 2013, the Town Council of Wildwood, New Jersey, located on the Jersey Shore, voted unanimously to ban sagging pants from the town's boardwalk.

In Ocala, Florida, a law was passed against sagging jeans, with violators facing a $500 fine or up to six months in jail. Something similar was done in Wildwood, New Jersey.

In September 2015, students at Hinds Community College in Mississippi protested college authorities for the right to sag their pants. The protest was prompted by the arrest of a student for sagging in violation of the college's dress code.

On July 5, 2016, an ordinance was passed in Timmonsville, South Carolina, that punishes sagging pants. Offenders may face up to a $600 fine.

Shreveport, Louisiana, repealed its prohibition on sagging pants in June 2019.

Opa-locka in Miami-Dade County, Florida, voted 4–1 to repeal their ban on sagging in September 2020.

==== Decline ====
Sagging declined in mainstream popularity during the mid to late 2010s. By 2017 it was observed that "the era of sagging pants is ending". Fashion writer Stephanie Smith-Strickland explained that because rappers and hip hop artists, such as Lil Yachty, were increasingly wearing tailored and well-fitted clothing, so too were the young men seeking to emulate them.

By the early 2020s, sagging was considered a "faded" trend in Philadelphia, where it had once been popular.

==== 2020s ====
In 2021, luxury fashion line Balenciaga was criticized for marketing a $1,190 pair of sweatpants with boxers woven into them in order to mimic sagging. Critics argued the product "gentrified sagging" and constituted cultural appropriation, and accused Balenciaga of attempting to monetize a trend which had a long history of being used to criminalize Black men.

Although sagging was no longer widely popular amongst men in the 2020s, a 2023 Washington Post article argued that "the age of female sagging" had begun. It was observed that sagging was now being embraced by young women, motivated by the post-COVID emphasis on comfort, and changing gender norms.

In 2023 Paper analyzed the post-COVID growth of an online community of gay men who regularly posted photographs and videos of sagging to social media sites such as Instagram. This was said to reflect a "core collective memory" shared by the posters - by now in their 20s and 30s - of sagging's mainstream popularity amongst heterosexual males during the posters' time at middle and high school (during the 2000s to mid-2010s). This process was said to be a "reclamation" of a trend that was, during its peak, associated with hypermasculinity.

== Europe ==
=== Denmark ===
By 2001, many young Danish men sagged baggy jeans. Physiotherapists warned against sagging, as it reduced the wearer to taking "small, weak steps", and required the wearer to bend over in order to reach into their pockets, which were often hanging around their knees.

By 2003, sagging had become popular amongst young middle- and upper-class Danish men who wanted to imitate rappers and gangsters.

In 2006, schools began banning sagging, citing concerns the students were limping instead of being able to walk normally.

In 2009, anthropologist Karen Lisa Salamon suggested that the waddling gait required by saggers was the most prominent cultural effect of fashion in Denmark in the 2000s.

After achieving mainstream popularity in the late 2000s, sagging fell out of fashion from the early 2010s. It was noted in 2013 that as young Danish men were no longer sagging, they were no longer walking with a waddling gait.

=== Sweden ===
In 2006, a school library in Falkenberg banned sagging, citing concerns about the students' inability to walk properly. However, after a student rebellion, in which students advocated for their right to follow the trend, the school withdrew the ban.

In 2007, further schools banned sagging pants in physical education classes for safety reasons. It was reported that some students were even struggling to manoeuvre through the cafeteria as they were unable to hold their food trays whilst constantly adjusting their sagging pants.

In 2009, public swimming pools in Sweden began banning sagging boardshorts or swim trunks.

=== United Kingdom ===
Young people of the United Kingdom began sagging in the early 1990s in order to display designer underwear labels such as Calvin Klein and Tommy Hilfiger.

In 2010, the Crown Prosecution Service attempted to serve 18-year-old Ellis Drummond from Rushden with an anti-social behaviour order (ASBO) preventing him from "wearing trousers so low beneath the waistline that members of the public are able to see his underwear." However, the ASBO was withdrawn after the judge said that such a ban would breach Drummond's human rights.

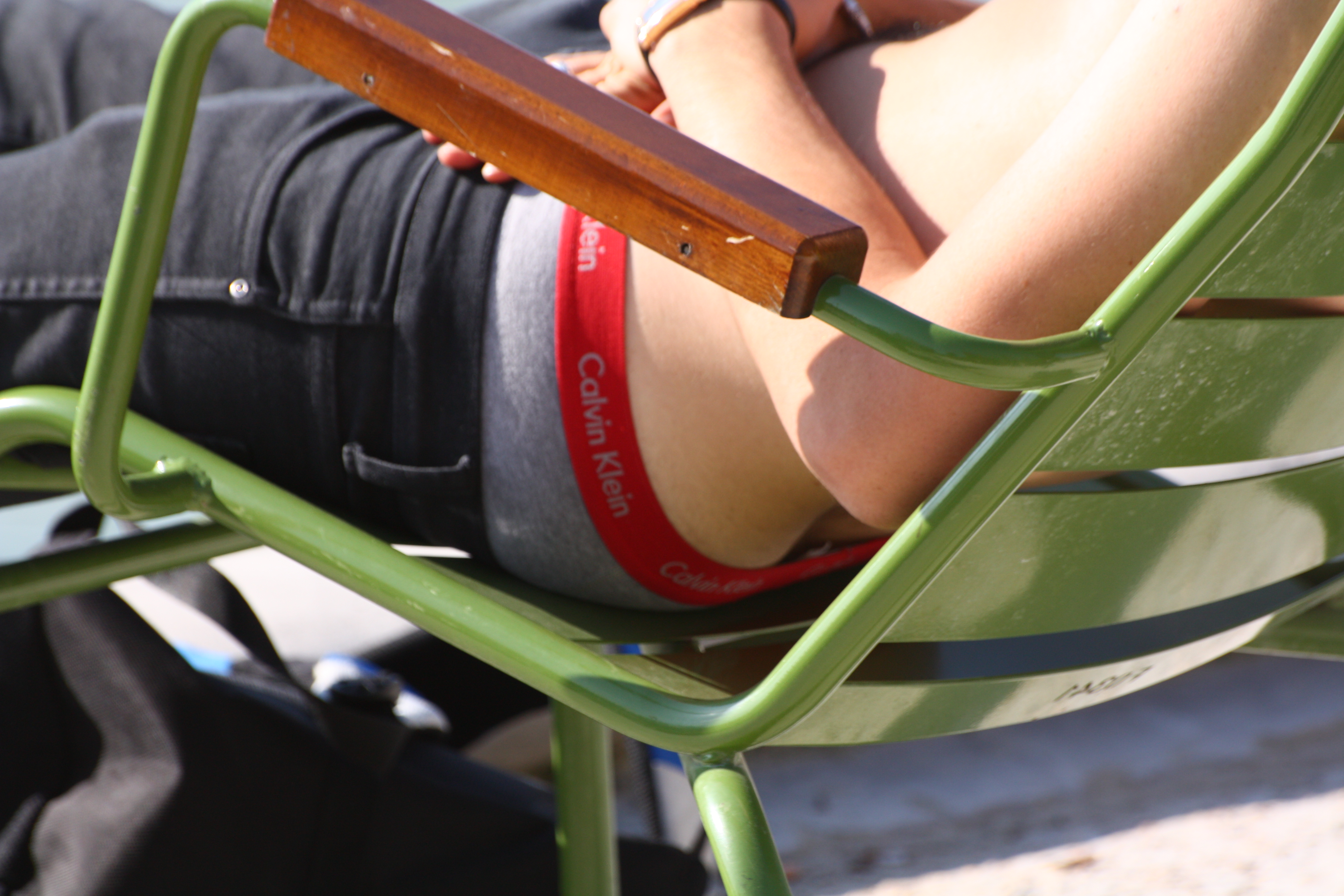
A young man sagging to expose his Calvin Klein underwear, 2009

By the early 2010s, sagging was described as "persistently popular" amongst teenage boys. In 2011, teenagers and men in their twenties were quoted as explaining they sagged "because everyone else does", "to conform", and because "people think you're really uncool (if you don't)": sagging had become so popular that young men chose to sag in order to fit in and avoid being ostracised.

During its mainstream popularity during the late 2000s and early 2010s, sagging was particularly popularised by "middle-class teenagers" and young men, including public school students and university students, often to expose designer underwear. It was reported in 2011 that some university students were deliberately sagging suit trousers at graduation ceremonies.

After fifteen years of mainstream "extreme popularity", sagging began to lose its appeal amongst young men from the early 2010s onwards. Debenhams suggested that young men had started to favour smarter, well-fitting trousers, reflecting an overall trend towards professionalism, in large part due to fear of unemployment and intense job competition after the 2008 financial crisis.

== Oceania ==
=== Australia ===
In 2008, a surf club in Coolum Beach banned men from sagging at the club. After a 19-year old surf instructor, Luke McClaren, was denied access to the club, the Queensland Council for Civil Liberties criticised the ban.

Parenting author Kelly Millar wrote that in the late 2000s and early 2010s, sagging had been particularly popular amongst wealthier private school boys, who used the trend to show off branded underwear such as Bonds.

In 2009, Bonds released a television commercial in which three young men, sagging their jeans to expose their Bonds underwear, mocked a group of elderly men wearing high-waisted pants.

By 2010, the trend was so widespread that the particular bandy-legged gait adopted by saggers - with their "legs extended a little extra to the side with each step to give their pants extra grip on their thighs" - was described as the "typical gait of the generation" of young Australian men. It was also noted that the trend had shifted away from baggy pants and that young men were instead sagging skinny jeans.

The link between sagging pants and graffiti culture was noted in Melbourne in 2010, with sagging being particularly associated with "vandals" and "taggers".

Sagging waned in popularity from the mid-2010s, and young men were sagging "less often" by 2017.

=== New Zealand ===
In 2002, it was reported that the sagging trend had been "widely embraced" by young Kiwi men, who regularly exposed "10 centimetres of boxer shorts". Multiple secondary schools, including Scots College, had banned the trend and were giving students detentions for sagging.

In 2002, the New Zealand Society of Physiotherapists warned that the "abnormal" and "exaggerated" gait adopted by saggers to prevent their pants from falling below their knees could cause spinal issues.

In 2011, it was reported that many young men were sagging so low that they were prevented from walking properly, and instead reduced to a waddle-like gait. It was noted that some teenagers, who sagged so low the crotch of their pants was at knee-level, were even unable to lift their leg high enough to board a bus.

== Asia ==
=== Gaza Strip ===
In 2013, the police force in Gaza launched a campaign named "Pull Up Your Pants", targeting Palestinian youth. Young men with sagging pants were stopped by police on the way to university and high school, and reprimanded or forced to return home to change clothing.

=== India ===
In 2009, it was reported that sagging was popular amongst Indian men aged 16 to 25, who imitated hip hop artists and wanted to expose their branded, designer underwear. Former law minister Shanti Bhushan noted that although sagging was considered obscene by some, it was not legally objectionable.

=== Japan ===
Koshipan (sagging) became popular amongst young men of Japan in the late 1990s. In 2006, a survey of high school students revealed that 16 percent sagged their pants. By 2010, it was reported that at least "ten percent of students in most schools" sagged. In the 2000s and early 2010s, sagging was linked to rap music and skateboarding, and was considered popular amongst 20-somethings.

In 2010, 21-year old Japanese olympic snowboarder Kazuhiro Kokubo was heavily criticised for wearing sagging pants when he flew from Narita International Airport to Vancouver for the 2010 Winter Olympics. Kokubo was punished by the Ski Association of Japan, including being banned from attending the opening ceremony.

Sagging became less popular from the 2010s onwards, with a shift towards neater, more formal and well-fitting clothing amongst high school students and young people.

== Sagging in popular culture ==
=== Music ===
British rapper Dizzee Rascal referenced the trend in his 2003 track "Cut 'em Off", which included the lyric "I wear my trousers ridiculously low".

During the 2010s, when sagging had reached mainstream popularity, it was referenced in hundreds of rap songs, including by Hopsin, Mac Miller, Lil Peep, Lil Dicky, Nasty C, Kodak Black and Yo Gotti, and YoungBoy Never Broke Again.

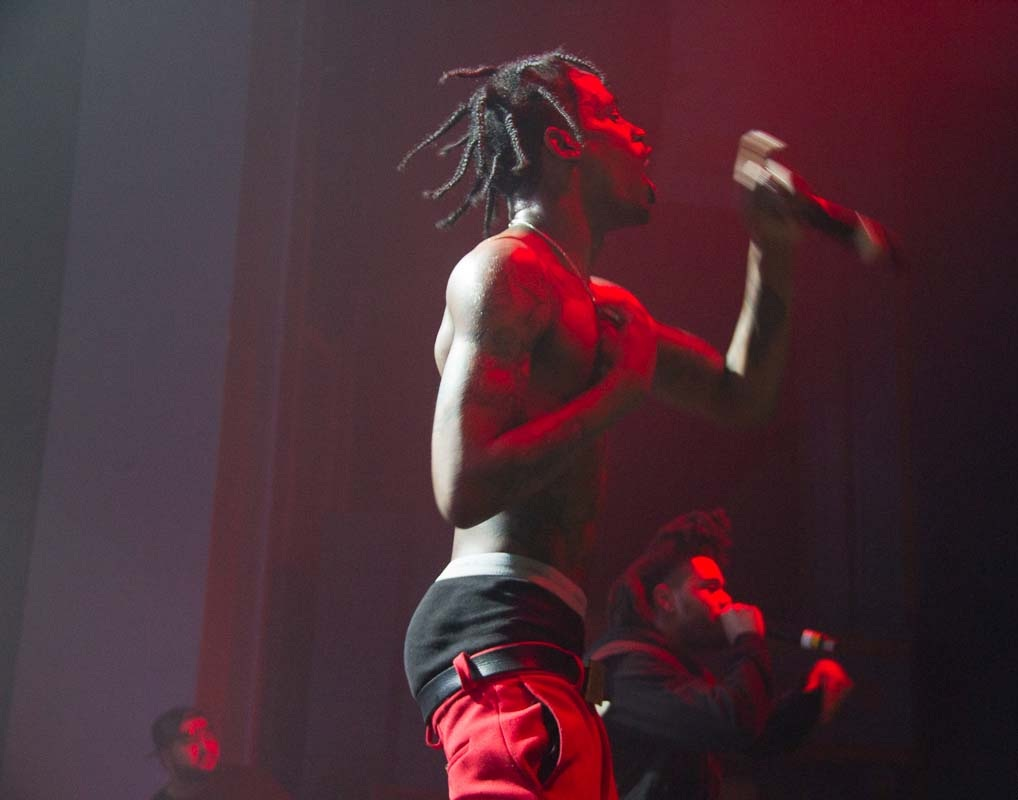
American rapper Travis Scott sagging his pants while performing in 2015

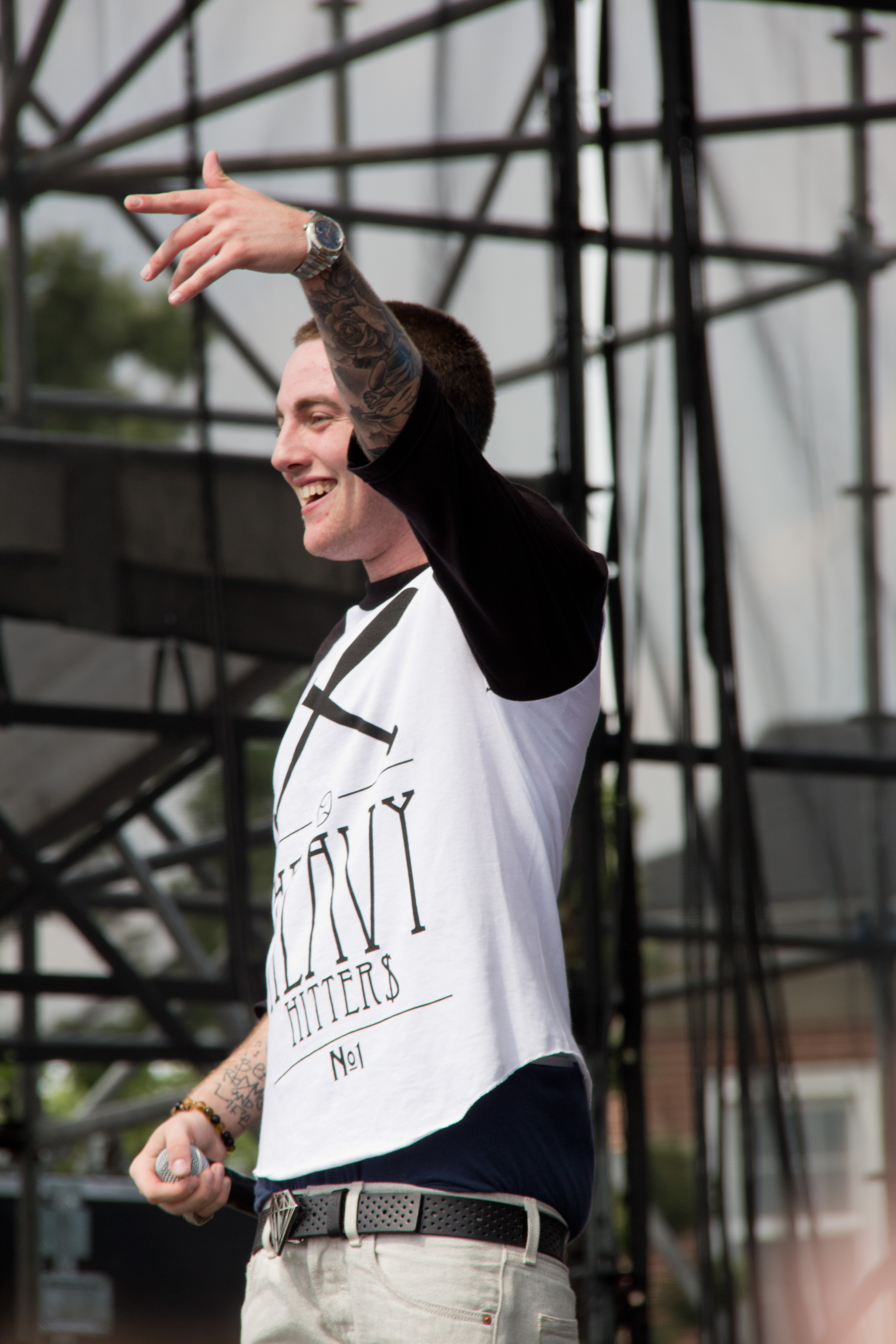
Mac Miller, who sang about sagging his pants in his 2014 song "Insomniak"

=== Music critical of sagging ===
Sagging has been ridiculed in music videos, first in the 2010 song "Back Pockets on the Floor" performed by the Green Brothers of Highland Park, Michigan. Another song in 2007 by Dewayne Brown of Dallas, Texas, titled "Pull Your Pants Up", has a similar message. On January 13, 2010, "General" Larry Platt performed "Pants on the Ground" during auditions for the ninth season of American Idol. In 2012, a nine-year-old rapper named Amor "Lilman" Arteaga wrote a song titled "Pull Ya Pants Up", and made a music video with an appearance by Brooklyn borough president Marty Markowitz.

== See also ==
- Buttock cleavage – Minor exposure of the buttocks
- Wide-leg jeans – Type of trousers
