= 2 Legit 2 Quit =

Single by Hammer

from the album Too Legit to Quit
- Released: September 5, 1991
- Recorded: 1989–1991
- Genre: Hip hop; new jack swing
- Length: 7:12; 5:10 (7" version); 5:36 (album version); 7:52 (legit remix); 10:16 (get bucked mix)
- Label: Capitol
- Songwriters: Stanley Burrell; James Earley; Michael Kelly; Louis K. Burrell; Felton Pilate
- Producer: Hammer

Hammer singles chronology
"Here Comes the Hammer" (1990)	"2 Legit 2 Quit" (1991)	"Addams Groove" (1991)

"2 Legit 2 Quit" is a song by American rapper Hammer (after removing M.C. from his name) featuring Saja (a.k.a. Sonia Moore), released on September 5, 1991 by Capitol Records as the first single from his fourth studio album (1991). The song proved to be successful in the United States, peaking in the top 10 of the Billboard Hot 100 at No. 5. It also peaked at No. 37 on the US Cash Box Top 100 and number 60 on the UK Singles Chart.

== Critical reception ==
Simon Dudfield from NME wrote, "Mediocre hip-hop beats coupled with a cockney chorus of 'So What?' (sampled from Alexei Sayle???) leaves you wondering if this is the last track off the album to become a single or what?"

== Music video ==
At almost 15 minutes in length, the accompanying music video for "2 Legit 2 Quit", directed by Rupert Wainwright, was one of the most expensive videos ever produced.

The uncut version of the video begins with a newscaster, played by Jim Belushi, reporting on Hammer's apparent decision to quit the music business, as well as responses from numerous celebrities including Danny Glover, Henry Winkler, Freedom Williams, David Faustino, Barry Sobel, Ralph Tresvant, Mark and Donnie Wahlberg, Eazy-E, DJ Quik, 2nd II None, Tony Danza, Queen Latifah, and Milli Vanilli. It then cuts to an impatient crowd waiting for Hammer to perform, while Hammer has a lengthy conversation with James Brown, who calls Hammer "Godson" and enlists him to obtain the glove of Michael Jackson. Brown endows Hammer with several blasts of energy before sending Hammer off to perform. After a high-budget performance laden with pyrotechnics, the video ends with a purported Jackson (seen only from behind) having seen the performance and conceding Hammer to be the superior dancer, while doing the "2 Legit 2 Quit" hand gesture.

The video also features the following athletes making cameo appearances in the following order: José Canseco, Isiah Thomas, Kirby Puckett, Jerry Rice, Rickey Henderson, Deion Sanders, Andre Rison, Chris Mullin, Roger Clemens, Roger Craig, Ronnie Lott, Lynette Woodard, the Dallas Cowboys Cheerleaders, David Robinson, and former Atlanta Falcons coach Jerry Glanville. Because various Falcons team members appeared in the video, the 1991 team was dubbed the "2 Legit 2 Quit" Falcons for utilizing the song as their team theme.

The video was No. 5 in MAX Music's World's Worst Ever Video countdown, and No. 1 in its Forgotten Video Clips countdown in 2008. It was also voted No. 24 on MTV's all-time "25 Lame" countdown in 1999. However, it has been selected as a viewer's favorite by VH1.

A hand gesture, popularized by the title song and video and also shown in the "Addams Groove" movie video and on MTV, involved forming the number two for "Too", an L for "Legit", and a "cut" motion for "Quit" with the hand and fingers (as seen in the video).

== Dance challenge ==
At the end of the "2 Legit 2 Quit" music video, after James Brown enlists Hammer to obtain the glove of Michael Jackson, a silver-white sequined glove is shown on the hand of a Jackson look-alike doing the "2 Legit 2 Quit" hand gesture. It was a reference to Hammer wanting to challenge Jackson to a dance-off for rights to his famous glove, which is also referenced on the album.

Hammer and Jackson would later appear, speak and perform at the funeral service for James Brown in 2006. M.C. Hammer appeared on The Wendy Williams Show on July 27, 2009, and told a story about a phone call he received from Michael Jackson, who approved the inclusion of a fake Jackson near the end of the "2 Legit 2 Quit" video. He explained how Jackson had seen the video and liked it, and both expressed they were a fan of each other.

== Televised performances ==
On the December 7, 1991 episode of Saturday Night Live, Hammer was the host and musical guest, performing "2 Legit 2 Quit" and two other songs.

In 1991, the song along with Hammer's "Addams Groove", was featured in the film The Addams Family.

For the opening of the 2010 BET Hip Hop Awards, Rick Ross, Diddy, and DJ Khaled performed "MC Hammer" (from the Teflon Don album), at which point Hammer stepped out to perform "2 Legit 2 Quit".

At the 40th American Music Awards, in November 2012, Hammer danced to "2 Legit 2 Quit" and "Gangnam Style" alongside Psy, both wearing his signature Hammer pants. The mashup, suggested by Psy's manager, was repeated by the two stars on December 31, 2012, during Dick Clark's New Year's Rockin' Eve and was released on iTunes.

== Track listing ==
1. "2 Legit 2 Quit" (7" edit remix)
2. "2 Legit 2 Quit" (Remix)
3. "2 Legit 2 Quit" (Instrumental)

== Charts ==
=== Weekly charts ===
Chart (1991–1992)	Peak Position
Australia (ARIA)	43
Canada Top Singles (RPM)	37
Finland (Suomen virallinen lista)	18
Italy Singles (Music&Media)	5
Netherlands (Dutch Top 40)	32
Netherlands (Single Top 100)	39
New Zealand (Recorded Music NZ)	4
UK Singles (OCC)	60
US Billboard Hot 100	5
US Hot R&B Singles (Billboard)	3
US Hot Rap Singles (Billboard)	4
US Hot Dance Music/Club Play (Billboard)	1
US Cash Box Top 100	37

=== Year-end chart ===
Chart (1992)	Position
US Billboard Hot 100	46

== Certifications ==
Region	Certification	Certified units/sales
New Zealand (RMNZ)	Gold	5,000^{*}
United States (RIAA)	Platinum	1,000,000^{^}
^{*} Sales figures based on certification alone.^{^} Shipments figures based on certification alone.

== See also ==
- List of most expensive music videos
