= Oaktown's 357 =

American hip hop group

- Genres: Hip hop, dance, R&B
- Years active: 1987–1992
- Labels: Capitol Records; Bust It Records
- Past members: Sweet L.D.; Terrible T; Lil P

Oaktown's 3.5.7 was a rap group formed by MC Hammer in 1987, via his Bust It Records label and Capitol Records. Members included Sweet L.D. (Suhayla Sabir), Lil P (Phyllis Charles) and Terrible T (Tabatha Zee King-Brooks).

Hammer dubbed the group's name as a salute to their hometown of Oakland, and to emphasize the power of the trio as dancers (comparing them to a .357 Magnum). They started out as backup singers for MC Hammer on tour before branching out as their own group.

Their 1989 album, Wild & Loose, peaked at number 126 on the Billboard 200 and number 23 on the Top R&B Albums chart. Their single, "Yeah, Yeah, Yeah", peaked at number 9 on the Billboard Hot Rap Songs chart.

The group disbanded in 1992.

== Discography ==
Albums

- Wild & Loose (1989)
- Fully Loaded (1991)

EPs

- Fila Treatment (1992)

=== Singles ===
Year	Single	Peak chart positions	Album
Year	Single	NZ	Album
1989	"Juicy Gotcha Krazy"	—	Wild & Loose
1989	"3-5-7 Straight At You"	—	Wild & Loose
1989	"Yeah, Yeah, Yeah"	—	Wild & Loose
1990	"We Like It"	—	Wild & Loose
1991	"Turn it Up"	14	Fully Loaded
1991	"It's Not Your Money"	40	Fully Loaded
1991	"Honey"	—	Fully Loaded
"—" denotes releases that did not chart or were not released in that country.
