= Active Duty (album) =

Studio album by MC Hammer
- Released: November 20, 2001
- Recorded: 2000–2001
- Genre: Hip hop; gospel; R&B
- Label: World Hit Records
- Producer: MC Hammer; Tyrone Davis; Keith Martin; Ed Tucker; Korey Riggins

MC Hammer chronology
The Hits (2000)	Active Duty (2001)	Full Blast (2004)

Singles from Active Duty
- 1. "No Stoppin' Us (USA)" Released: November 6, 2001; 2. "Pop Yo Collar" Released: December 5, 2001

Active Duty is the seventh studio album, and first independent album since Feel My Power, by American rapper MC Hammer. It was released on November 20, 2001 by his own label, World Hits Records. This is Hammer's first studio album since Inside Out (1995), excluding his unreleased Death Row debut Too Tight (1996) and the limited release gospel double album Family Affair (1998).

Following the September 11 attacks, Hammer released this album on his own World Hit Music Group label (the music enterprise under his Hammertime Holdings Inc. umbrella) to pay homage to the ones lost in the terrorist attacks. in which the album followed that theme. One of the album's singles was "Pop Yo Collar", which was a popular "buzzword/catchphrase" during this period.

The album, like its predecessor, would not sell as many copies as previous projects. Hammer did however promote it on shows such as The View, and produced a music video for both singles.

A patriotic album, originally planned to be titled The Autobiography of M.C. Hammer, portions of the proceeds were donated to 9/11 charities. Hammer shot the video for the anthem "No Stoppin' Us (USA)" in Washington, D.C., on October 3, 2001, with several members of the United States Congress, who sang in the song and danced in the music video. Present members of the United States House of Representatives included J.C. Watts, Eddie Bernice Johnson, Thomas M. Davis, Earl Hilliard, Alcee Hastings, Rep. Diane Watson (D-Calif.), Rep. Corrine Brown (D-Fla.) and Jesse Jackson Jr.

The "Pop Yo Collar" music video demonstrated "The Phat Daddy Pop", "In Pop Nito", "River Pop", "Deliver The Pop" and "Pop'n It Up" dance moves, among others.

== Track listing ==
1. "No Stoppin' Us (USA)"
2. "Pick It Up" (featuring The Stooge Playas)
3. "Our Style" (featuring The Stooge Playas)
4. "Pop Yo Collar" (featuring Wee Wee)
5. "A Soldier's Letter" (featuring James Greer and Keith Martin)
6. "What Happened To Our Hood" (featuring James Greer)
7. "It's All Love" (featuring James Greer and The Stooge Playas)
8. "Bump This" (featuring The Stooge Playas)
9. "Not Like This"
10. "Spittin' Fire"
11. "Don't Be Discouraged" (introducing Pleasure)
12. "I Don't Care" (introducing Analise)
13. "Who's Holdin' It"
14. "Cali" (featuring The Stooge Playas)
15. "Night Show" (introducing James Greer)
16. "Where Will I Go" (featuring Chuck Get Down)
17. "Bay Livin'" (featuring Chuck Get Down and Conte)
18. "Broken Vessel ("Common Unity")" (featuring April and Toya Smith)
19. "Why Do You Wanna Take Mine" (featuring The Stooge Playas, XLarge and Chuck Get Down)

== Samples ==
- "No Stoppin' Us (USA)" contains a sample of "Ain't Gonna Hurt Nobody" performed by Brick.
- "A Soldier's Letter" contains an interpolation of "Strawberry Letter 23" as performed by The Brothers Johnson.
