= Pass Me Not, O Gentle Saviour =

19th-century American hymn

- by Fanny Crosby
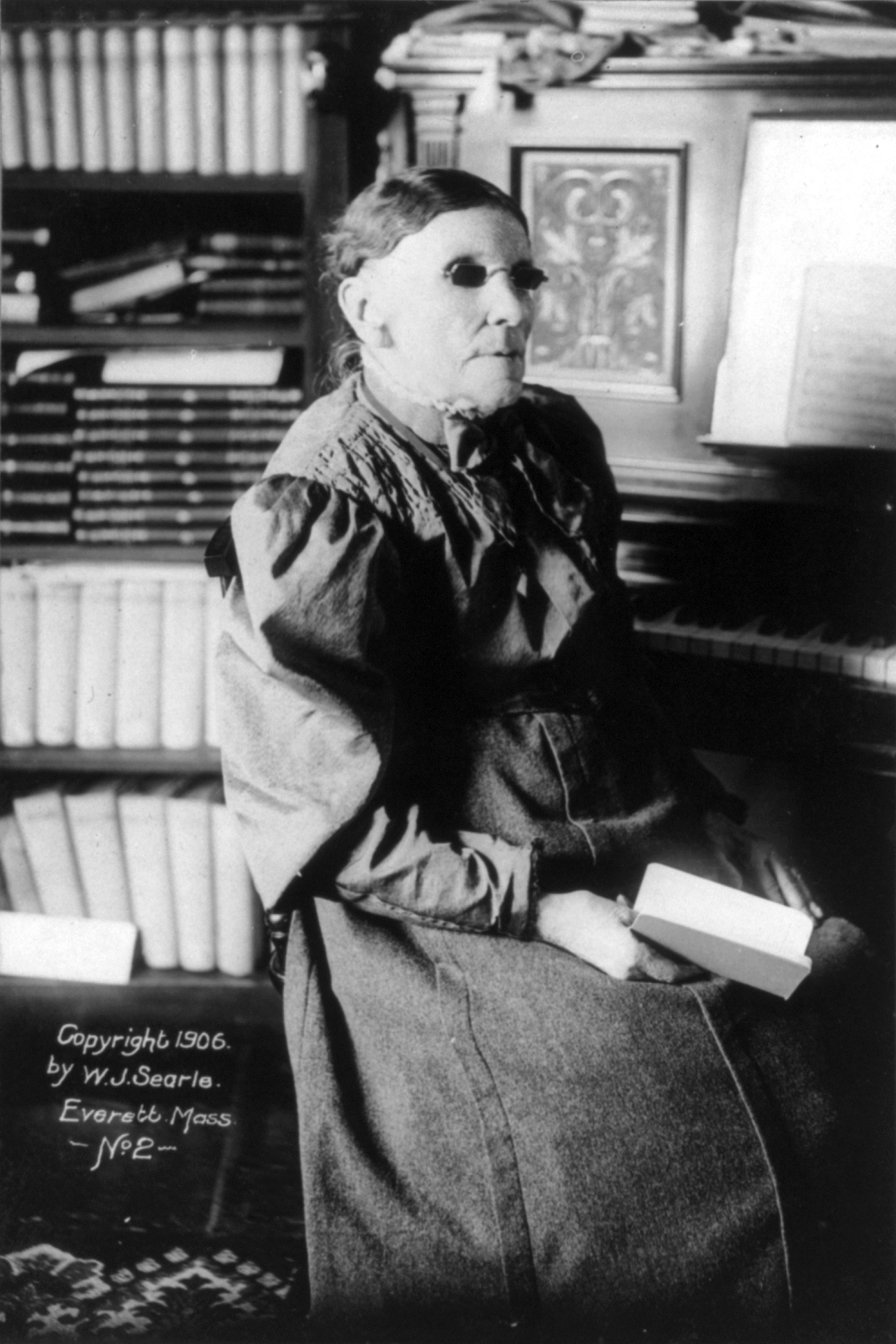
- Genre: Hymn
- Written: 1868
- Based on: Luke 18:38
- Meter: 8.5.8.5 with refrain
- Melody: "Pass Me Not" by William H. Doane
- Pass Me Not, O Gentle Saviour Performed by the Sacramento Slavic SDA Church; Recorded October 2022

Pass Me Not, O Gentle Saviour

Pass me not, O gentle Saviour,
Hear my humble cry.
While on others Thou art calling,
Do not pass me by.

Saviour, Saviour,
Hear my humble cry.
While on others Thou art calling,
Do not pass me by.

Let me at Thy throne of mercy,
Find a sweet relief.
Kneeling there in deep contrition,
Help my unbelief.

Saviour, Saviour,
Hear my humble cry.
While on others Thou art calling,
Do not pass me by.

Trusting only in Thy merit,
Would I seek Thy face,
Heal my wounded, broken spirit,
Save me by Thy grace.

Fanny J. Crosby, 1868

"Pass Me Not, O Gentle Savior" is a 19th-century American hymn written by American mission worker, poet, lyricist, and composer Fanny Crosby in 1868, set to music by William H. Doane in 1870.

== M.C. Hammer recording ==
In 1991, American hip hop artist MC Hammer released a version of the hymn entitled "Do Not Pass Me By" on his fourth album, Too Legit to Quit (1991) - basically rap parts added to an up-tempo arrangement by Douglas Miller entitled "Pass Me Not" from 1986. Gospel artist Tramaine Hawkins appeared on the song as a guest vocalist. It peaked at numbers 43 and 62 on the US Cash Box Top 100 and Billboard Hot 100 charts. A music video was also produced for this single.

=== Charts ===
Chart (1992)	Peak position
UK Singles (OCC)	14
UK Airplay (Music Week)	10
UK Dance (Music Week)	40
US Billboard Hot 100	62
US Hot R&B Singles (Billboard)	15
US Cash Box Top 100	43

== Other recordings ==
- The hymn has been recorded by singers including Reggie Houston, Cyrus Chestnut, Bill Gaither, and Lyle Lovett. Bob Dylan performed this song live to open five concerts in his 2002 American tour.
